= List of series run in Weekly Shōnen Sunday =

Weekly Shōnen Sunday cover for its 62nd anniversary in 2021

Weekly Shōnen Sunday, a shōnen manga magazine published by Shogakukan, has featured numerous series since its launch in 1959. The list is organized by decade, year, and issue number when the series began. It lists each series that appeared in the magazine, the author of each series, and, if the series has ended, the year and issue number it ended.

== 1950s ==
=== 1959 ===
Manga	First issue	Final issue	Manga artist
Dr. Thrill (スリル博士)	#1, 1959	#23, 1959	Osamu Tezuka
The Lone Ranger (ローンレンジャー)	#1, 1959	#29, 1959	Tsuneo Yamada
Sportsman Kintaro (スポーツマン金太郎)	#1, 1959	#45, 1963	Hiro Terada
Uchuu Shōnen Tonda (宇宙少年トンダー)	#1, 1959	#29, 1959	Ryuichi Yokoyama
Umi no Ouji (海の王子)	#1, 1959	#14, 1961	Fujiko Fujio, Aoi Takagaki
Maboroshi Taisho (まぼろし大将)	#9, 1959	#20, 1959	Katsumi Mashiko
Tonkatsu-chan (トンカツちゃん)	#20, 1959	#30, 1959	Shotaro Ishinomori
Kaikyuu x Arawaru!! (快球Xあらわる!!)	#21, 1959	#38, 1961	Katsumi Mashiko, Toto Mashu
Zero Man (0マン)	#24, 1959	#50, 1960	Osamu Tezuka
Ryuichi Yoru Banashi (隆一夜ばなし)	#30, 1959	#13, 1959	Ryuichi Yokoyama
Dynamic 3 (ダイナミック3)	#33, 1959	#2, 1960	Shotaro Ishinomori

== 1960s ==
=== 1960–1964 ===
Manga	First issue	Final issue	Manga artist
Kakedaze Dash (かけだせダッシュ)	#3, 1960	#21, 1960	Shōtarō Ishinomori
Denko Red (電光レッド)	#14, 1960	#30, 1960	Kinda Kaneda
Tonkachi Musuko (トンカチむすこ)	#14, 1960	#40, 1960	Sanpei Wachi
Yarikuri Tengoku (やりくり天国)	#14, 1960	#28, 1960	Kazuo Maekawa, Kobako Hanato
Seibangou 0 Monogatari (背番号0物語)	#17, 1960	#52, 1960	Hiro Terada
Pink-chan (ピンクちゃん)	#22, 1960	#6, 1961	Shiro Mihara
Shippo Eitaro (疾風影太郎)	#28, 1960	#52, 1960	Satoru Ozawa, Tsunayoshi Takeuchi
Boku wa Jonbe he (ぼくはジョンべえ)	#29, 1960	#52, 1960	Jirō Tsunoda
Captain Ken (キャプテンKen)	#41, 1960	#52, 1960	Osamu Tezuka
Kon-chan (コンちゃん)	#51, 1960	#34, 1961	Hiroshi Ishikawa
Bun Bun (ブンブン)	#1, 1961	#7, 1961	Sanpei Wachi
Kon-chan Torimonocho (崑ちゃん捕物帖)	#8, 1961	#36, 1961	Kazuo Maekawa, Kobako Hanato
Iga no Kagemaru (伊賀の影丸)	#14, 1961	#39, 1966	Mitsuteru Yokoyama
Shonen Kenia (少年ケニヤ)	#14, 1961	#15, 1962	Kyuta Ishikawa, Soji Yamakawa
Shiroi Pilot (白いパイロット)	#35, 1961	#26, 1962	Osamu Tezuka
Konchaasu Bon Taro (こんちゃーすボン太郎)	#39, 1961	#12, 1962	Katsumi Mashiko, Toto Mashu
Uchuu Keibitai (宇宙警備隊)	#49, 1961	#15, 1962	Mitsuteru Yokoyama
Tonga Series (トンガ・シリーズ)	#4, 1962	#14, 1962	Gozomu Kaga
Big 1 (ビッグ・1)	#12, 1962	#29, 1962	Fujiko Fujio
Kakero Tenba (翔けろ天馬)	#15, 1962	#42, 1962	Hisashi Sekiya
Osomatsu-kun (おそ松くん)	#16, 1962	#15, 1969	Fujio Akatsuka
Brave Dan (勇者ダン)	#29, 1962	#52, 1969	Osamu Tezuka
Chibikko Chocho (ちびっこ町長)	#41, 1962	#52, 1962	Sanpei Wachi
Ozora no Chikai (大空のちかい)	#45, 1962	#19, 1964	Ippei Kuri
Ganbare Kenta (がんばれ健太)	#1, 1963	#11, 1963	Akio Ito
Submarine 707 (サブマリン707)	#2, 1963	#41, 1965	Satoru Osawa
Midori no Mujinto (緑の無人島)	#15, 1963	#29, 1963	Kyuta Ishikawa, Yoichiro Minami
Akuma no Oto (悪魔の音)	#17, 1963	#18, 1963	Osamu Tezuka
Bakansu Kozo (バカンス小僧)	#28, 1963	#38, 1963	Katsumi Mashiko
Maboroshi Buntai (まぼろし分隊)	#28, 1963	#41, 1963	Shin Ehara
Robot-kun (ロボットくん)	#39, 1963	#52, 1963	Koremitsu Maetani
Kaze no Jirokichi (風の次郎吉)	#42, 1963	#52, 1963	Tsunayoshi Takeuchi
Kurayami Godan (暗闇五段)	#46, 1963	#31, 1964	Hiro Terada
Inazuma Ace (いなずまエース)	#1, 1964	#11, 1964	Joji Enami
Hoero! Racer (吠えろ!レーサー)	#2, 1964	#17, 1964	Hisashi Sekiya
Obake no Q-tarō (オバケのQ太郎)	#6, 1964	#51, 1966	Fujiko Fujio
Kotetsu Ningen Shiguma (鋼鉄人間シグマ)	#14, 1964	#3/4, 1965	Koji Tsukamoto, Mitsuteru Yokoyama
Kyuban Dasha (九番打者)	#27, 1964	#18, 1965	Hiroshi Kaizuka
Yami no Sakon (闇の左近)	#27, 1964	#52, 1964	Osamu Kishimoto
Niji no Sentotai (虹の戦闘隊)	#27, 1964	#43, 1964	Toshio Shōji
Pocket Rikishi (ポケット歴史)	#43, 1964	#3/4, 1965	Yutaka Yoshida
Black Dan (ブラック団)	#44, 1964	#30, 1966	Jirō Tsunoda

=== 1965–1969 ===
Manga	First issue	Final issue	Manga artist
Super Jetter (スーパージェッター)	#1, 1965	#2, 1966	Fumio Hisamatsu
Ore wa Yaruzo (俺はやるぞ)	#2, 1965	#16, 1965	Yoshiteru Takano
MM Santa (エムエム三太)	#5, 1965	#17, 1965	Daisuke Sensa
Berabo (べら坊)	#17, 1965	#31, 1965	Kenji Morita
Miracle A (ミラクルA)	#19, 1965	#21, 1966	Hiroshi Kaizuka
Kamui Gaiden – Part 1 (カムイ伝 第一部)	#21, 1965	#3-4, 1967	Sampei Shirato
The Amazing 3 (W3 (ワンダー・スリー))	#23, 1965	#18, 1966	Osamu Tezuka
Attack Kobushi (アタック拳)	#37, 1965	#46, 1965	Noboru Kawasaki
Ore no Taiyo (おれの太陽)	#40, 1965	#6, 1966	Jirō Tsunoda
Korya My Futoshi (こりゃマイッ太)	#40, 1965	#21, 1966	Sho Murotanitsune
Captain Goro (キャプテン五郎)	#51, 1965	#9, 1966	Noboru Kawasaki
Ryu no Hata (竜の旗)	#5, 1966	#40, 1966	Mikiya Mochizuki
Shinigami Hakase (死神博士)	#11, 1966	#28, 1966	Noboru Kawasaki
Thunder Kid (サンダーキッド)	#15, 1966	#30, 1966	Fumio Hisamatsu
The Vampires (バンパイヤ)	#23, 1966	#19, 1967	Osamu Tezuka
Star 9 (スター9)	#25, 1966	#10, 1967	Shin Ehara
Genjin Bibi (原人ビビ)	#31, 1966	#31, 1967	Kyuta Ishikawa
Kaimushi Kabuton (怪虫カブトン)	#35, 1966	#51, 1966	Jirō Tsunoda
Abare Osho (あばれ王将)	#41, 1966	#18, 1967	Hiroshi Kaizuka
Kamen no Ninja Akakage (仮面の忍者 赤影)	#45, 1966	#48, 1967	Mitsuteru Yokoyama
Boken Gaboten Shima (冒険ガボテン島)	#50, 1966	#49, 1967	Fumio Hisamatsu
Hi no Maru Jindai (日の丸陣太)	#1, 1967	#23, 1967	Mikiya Mochizuki
Jikogu-kun (地獄くん)	#1, 1967	#7, 1967	Sho Murotanitsune
Parman (パーマン, Pāman)	#2, 1967	#44, 1967	Fujiko F. Fujio
Blue Submarine No. 6 (青の6号)	#2, 1967	#45, 1967	Satoru Ozawa
Captain Ultra (キャプテンウルトラ)	#8, 1967	#38, 1967	Shunji Obata
Animal One (アニマル1 (ワン))	#11, 1967	#35, 1967	Noboru Kawasaki
Sabu to Ichi Torimono Hikae (佐武と市捕物控)	#11, 1967	#33, 1967 (Note: Transferred to Big Comic)	Shōtarō Ishinomori
Guriguri (グリグリ)	#19, 1967	#47, 1967	Jirō Tsunoda
Giant Robo (ジャイアントロボ, Jaianto Robo)	#20, 1967	#10, 1968	Mitsuteru Yokoyama, Satoru Ozawa
Danganko (弾丸児)	#28, 1967	#14, 1968	Ippei Kuri
Oraa Guzura Dato (おらぁグズラだど)	#31, 1967	#28, 1968	Rentaro Sakai, Hiroshi Sasagawa
Dororo (どろろ)	#35, 1967	#30, 1968 (Note: Transferred to Akita Shoten's Bōken Ō)	Osamu Tezuka
Akatasuki Sentai (あかつき戦闘隊)	#46, 1967	#18, 1969	Mitsuyoshi Sonoda
Captain Scarlet (キャプテンスカーレット)	#47, 1967	#27, 1968	Joji Enami, Sachihiko Kitagawa
Mōretsu Atarō (もーれつア太郎)	#48, 1967	#27, 1970	Fujio Akatsuka
21 Emon (21エモン, Nijūichi emon)	#1, 1968	#6, 1969	Fujiko F. Fujio
Blue Zone (ブルーゾーン)	#6, 1968	#29, 1968	Shōtarō Ishinomori
Moero Nio (燃えろ仁王)	#7, 1968	#27, 1968	Shinji Hama, Kazuya Fukimoto
Doctor Tsururi (ドクター・ツルリ)	#12, 1968	#36, 1968	Sho Murotanitsune
MJ	#15, 1968	#43, 1968	Masamichi Yokoyama, Tetsuo Kinjo
Tenamonya Ipponyari (てなもんや一本槍)	#16, 1968	#52, 1968	Jirō Tsunoda
Kappa no Sanpei (河童の三平)	#28, 1968	#46, 1969	Shigeru Mizuki
Ah!! Koshien (ああ!!甲子園)	#29, 1968	#38, 1968	Mitsuyoshi Sonoda, Yutaka Irie
Dokachin (ドカチン)	#29, 1968	#11, 1969	Rentaro Sakai, Tatsuo Yoshida
Utae!! Mustang (歌え!!ムスタング)	#30, 1968	#19, 1969	Noboru Kawasaki, Kazuya Fukamoto
Judo Boy (紅三四郎, Kurenai Sanshirō)	#31, 1968	#47, 1968	Tatsuo Yoshida, Ippei Kuri
Sasuke (サスケ)	#32, 1968	#22, 1969	Sanpei Shirato
Chikyu Number V7 (地球ナンバーV7)	#38, 1968	#13, 1969	Mitsuteru Yokoyama
Hitokui Tetsudo (人喰鉄道)	#3, 1969	#22, 1969	Kyuta Ishikawa, Yukio Togawa
Ume-boshi no Denka (ウメ星デンカ)	#7, 1969	#35, 1969	Fujiko Fujio
Kudabare!! Namida-kun (くたばれ!!涙くん)	#7, 1969	#45, 1970	Isami Ishii
Target (ターゲット)	#20, 1969	#24, 1970	Mitsuyoshi Sonoda
Doronko Kyujo (泥んこ球場)	#21, 1969	#30, 1969	Joji Enami, Kazuo Fukumoto
Yami no Kaze (闇の風)	#23, 1969	#41, 1969	Shōtarō Ishinomori
Orochi (おろち)	#25, 1969	#35, 1970	Kazuo Umezu
Devil King (デビルキング)	#31, 1969	#17, 1970	Takao Saito
Tensai Bakabon (天才バカボン)	#35, 1969	#15, 1970	Fujio Akatsuka
Gen to Tsugumi (源とツグミ)	#38, 1969	#52, 1969	Haruo Koyama, Haruko Sumomo
Chikai no Hata (誓いの旗)	#46, 1969	#19, 1970	Takumi Nagayasu, Shiro Jinbo

== 1970s ==
=== 1970–1974 ===
Manga	First issue	Final issue	Manga artist
Dekkadeka (でっかでか)	#1, 1970	#15, 1970	Tsutomu Oyamada
Otoko do Aho Koshien (男どアホウ甲子園)	#8, 1970	#9, 1975	Shinji Mizushima, Mamoru Sasaki
Zeni Geba (銭ゲバ)	#13, 1970	#6, 1971	George Akiyama
Go!! Go!! Nonsense (GO!!豪!!ナンセンス)	#13, 1970	#28, 1970	Go Nagai
CM Yarou (CM野郎)	#16, 1970	#32, 1970	Shotaro Ishinomori
Group Gin (グループ銀)	#19, 1970	#48, 1970	Takao Saito
Yoake no Makki (夜明けのマッキー)	#21, 1970	#52, 1970	Mikiya Mochizuki
Tobenai Tsubasa (とべない翼)	#25, 1970	#17, 1971	Sachio Umemoto, Hisao Maki
Keiji Yoshitani (高校さすらい派)	#29, 1970	#34, 1970	Kai Takizawa
Maro (まろ)	#30, 1970	#27, 1971	Go Nagai
Bukkare Dan (ぶッかれ・ダン)	#32, 1970	#13, 1971	Fujio Akatsuka
The Shikippuru (ザ・色っぷる)	#41, 1970	#46, 1970	Hideo Azuma
Again (アゲイン)	#43, 1970	#5, 1971	Kazuo Umezu
Dame Oyaji (ダメおやじ)	#43, 1970	#30, 1982	Mitsutoshi Furuya
Kenka no Bible (ケンカの聖書(バイブ))	#1, 1971	#53, 1971	Isami Ishii, Ikki Kajiwara
Rekka (烈火)	#2, 1971	#33, 1971	Takao Saito
Kokuhaku (告白)	#11, 1971	#21, 1971	George Akiyama
Seishun Dobaku (青春賭博)	#17, 1971	#38, 1971	Ryoichi Ikegami, Hisao Maki
Kaijin Jaguar Man (怪人ジャガーマン)	#18, 1971	#27, 1971	Monkey Punch
Sokkyūya (速球屋)	#22, 1971	#43, 1971	Yoshisato Kōsan
Tamagawa-kun (タマガワ君)	#23, 1971	#32, 1971	Tsutomu Adachi
Tabidate! Hirarin (旅立て!ひらりん)	#25, 1971	#35, 1971	Tatsuhiko Yamagami
Subahen (ズバ蛮)	#28, 1971	#53, 1971	Go Nagai
Hadashi no Bun (はだしのブン)	#31, 1971	#49, 1971	Shinji Nagashima
Hato to Sakura (鳩と桜)	#33, 1971	#47, 1971	Takeshi Shinden, Kazuo Koike
Senbe (仙べえ)	#37, 1971	#3/4, 1972	Fujiko Fujio
Rettsuragon (レッツラゴン)	#37, 1971	#29, 1974	Fujio Akatsuka
GeGeGe no Kitarō (ゲゲゲの鬼太郎, GeGeGe no Kitaro)	#40, 1971	#53, 1971 (Note: Only a few chapters were published in the magazine)	Shigeru Mizuki
Abare Fubuki (あばれフブキ)	#41, 1971	#53, 1971	Mitsuyoshi Sonoda, Kai Takizawa
Cyborg Ace (サイボーグエース)	#44, 1971	#13, 1972	Hideaki Kitano
Challenge D (チャレンジD)	#48, 1971	#14, 1972	Motonori Okura, Toshiro Ishido
Hiyoshi no Shiro (日吉の城)	#1, 1972	#16, 1972	Hiroshi Kaizuka
Dust 18 (ダスト18)	#2, 1972	#21, 1972	Osamu Tezuka
Kedaman (ケダマン)	#3/4, 1972	#45, 1972	Go Nagai
Kibahashiri (牙走り)	#3/4, 1972	#32, 1974	Takumi Nagayasu, Kazuo Koike
Arajin no Musuko (アラジンの息子)	#5, 1972	#17, 1972	Mitsuyoshi Sonoda, Himiko Hicho
The Moon (ザ・ムーン)	#14, 1972	#18, 1973	George Akiyama
Nagareboshi Sub (流れ星サブ)	#15, 1972	#24, 1972	Yoshisato Takayama
Akado Suzunosuke (赤胴鈴之助)	#16, 1972	#35, 1972	Tsunayoshi Takeuchi
Judo Sanka (柔道讃歌)	#21, 1972	#14, 1975	Hiroshi Kaizuka, Ikki Kajiwara
Koma ga Mau (駒が舞う)	#22, 1972	#30, 1973	Oshima
The Drifting Classroom (漂流教室, Hyouryuu Kyoushitsu)	#23, 1972	#27, 1974	Kazuo Umezu
Jinzō-Ningen Kikaider (人造人間キカイダー)	#30, 1972	#13, 1974	Shotaro Ishinomori
Kantaro Monogatari (かん太郎物語)	#35, 1972	#45, 1972	Hiroshi Motomiya
Fuma Kotaro (風魔孤太郎)	#40, 1972	#52, 1972	Ken Ishikawa, Jirō Gyū
Thunder Mask (サンダーマスク)	#43, 1972	#2, 1973	Osamu Tezuka
Tatsu ga Kiru! (竜が斬る!)	#45, 1972	#26, 1973	Isami Ishii, Mamoru Sasaki
Oi! Boketan (おーい!ボケタン)	#47, 1972	#13, 1973	Big Jo
Fuefuki Doji (笛吹童子)	#52, 1972	#19, 1973	Masanobu Asai, Hisao Kitamura
Jinjin no Jin (じんじんの仁)	#11, 1973	#40, 1973	Joya Kagemaru, Kimio Komatsu
Okkaa Yakuza (おっ母ァやくざ)	#15, 1973	#32, 1973	Yosuke Tamaru, Akira Hayasaka
Ultraman Taro (ウルトラマンタロウ)	#17, 1973	#34, 1973	Ken Ishikawa
Kuroi Washi (黒い鷲)	#19, 1973	#6/7, 1974	Yoshimoto Baron
Inazuman (イナズマン)	#34, 1973	#38, 1974	Shotaro Ishinomori
Catch Man (キャッチマン)	#37, 1973	#8, 1974	Yasuichi Oshima
Dororon Enma-kun (ドロロンえん魔くん)	#41, 1973	#52, 1973	Go Nagai
Diamond Eye (ダイヤモンド・アイ)	#43, 1973	#13, 1974	Katsumi Hashimoto, Kohan Kawauchi
Ore wa Chokkaku (おれは直角)	#45, 1973	#17, 1976	Yu Koyama
Otoko Gumi (男組)	#4/5, 1974	#30, 1974	Ryoichi Ikegami, Tetsu Kariya
Pro Golfer Saru (プロゴルファー猿)	#13, 1974	#45, 1978	Fujiko A. Fujio
Getter Robot (ゲッターロボ)	#15, 1974	#3/4, 1976	Go Nagai, Ken Ishikawa
Oira Sukeban (おいら女蛮)	#32, 1974	#3/4, 1976	Go Nagai
Shonen Friday (少年フライデー)	#33, 1974	#11, 1975	Fujio Akatsuka
Musashi (ムサシ)	#35, 1974 (Note: First period from Issue #35, 1974 to Issue #33, 1976 Second period from Issue #37, 1976 to Issue #20, 1977)	#20, 1977	Noboru Kawasaki, Kazuo Koike
Ganbare Robokon (がんばれ!!ロボコン)	#42, 1974	#16, 1975	Shotaro Ishinomori

=== 1975–1979 ===
Manga	First issue	Final issue	Manga artist
Kibasen (牙戦)	#2, 1975	#34, 1975	Mitsuru Adachi, Kai Takizawa
Nora Gaki (のらガキ)	#12, 1975	#25, 1976	Fujio Akatsuka
Himitsu Sentai Goranger (ゴレンジャー, Go Renjā)	#18, 1975	#23, 1976	Shotaro Ishinomori
Ikkyu-san (一球さん)	#21, 1975	#52, 1977	Shinji Mizushima
Tenkaiichi Omonoten (天下一大物伝)	#29, 1975	#16, 1976	Yasuichi Oshima, Ikki Kajiwara
Shin Himitsu Sentai Gorenja Gokko (新ひみつ戦隊ゴレンジャーごっこ)	#33, 1975	#23, 1976	Shotaro Ishinomori
Kamen Godamaru (仮面豪打丸)	#41, 1975	#50, 1975	Hiroshi Kaizuka
Goemon Rokku (ゴエモンろっく)	#43, 1975	#2, 1976	Shin Tamura
Saggy Bappa (サギバッパ)	#2, 1976	#24, 1976	George Akiyama
Megido no Hi (メギドの火)	#3/4, 1976	#30, 1976	Jirō Tsunoda
Gamushara (がむしゃら)	#5/6, 1976	#18, 1976	Mitsuru Adachi, Jūzo Yamasaki
Ginrin Jaguar (銀輪ジャガー)	#12, 1976	#25, 1976	Ryo Sakonji, Sho Fumimura
Makoto-chan (まことちゃん)	#16, 1976	#30, 1981	Kazuo Umezu
God Arm (ゴッド・アーム)	#18, 1976	#29, 1977	Jiro Kuwata, Ikki Kajiwara
Ganbare Genki (がんばれ元気)	#19, 1976	#14, 1981	Yū Koyama
Cat Eyed Boy (猫目小僧, Nekome Kozō)	#20, 1976	#40, 1976 (Note: Only a few chapters were published in the magazine)	Yū Koyama
Kaa-chan No. 1 (母ちゃんNo.1)	#27, 1976	#12, 1977	Fujio Akatsuka
Doggu World (ドッグワールド)	#35, 1976	#18, 1977	Shōtarō Ishinomori
Survival (サバイバル)	#38, 1976	#52, 1980.	Takao Saito
Boku Chan Sensei (ぼくちゃん先生)	#42, 1976	#52, 1976	Kimio Yanigasawa
Ginrin Tama (銀輪魂)	#3/4, 1977	#14, 1977	Ryo Sakonji, Sho Fumimura
Tsukiya (突き屋)	#5/6, 1977	#32, 1977	Hosei Hasegawa, Tetsu Kariya
Akai Pegasus (赤いペガサス)	#13, 1977	#38, 1979	Motoka Murakami
Gyag Ariki (ギャグありき)	#16, 1977	#41, 1977	Fujio Akatsuka
Katsumi (かつみ)	#18, 1977	#36, 1977	Takao Yaguchi
Oyako Deka (おやこ刑事)	#21, 1977	#12, 1981	Yasuichi Oshima, Norio Hayashi
Seishun no Kawa (青春の河)	#29, 1977	#12, 1978	George Akiyama
Dekin Boy (できんボーイ)	#35, 1977	#16, 1979	Shin Takura
Eiyu Shikkaku (英雄失格)	#37, 1977	#40, 1978	Hiromi Yamasaki, Ikki Kajiwara
Tobetobe Tonbi (とべとべとんび)	#39, 1977	#8, 1978	Hosei Hasegawa
Yakyu Mushi (野球虫)	#1, 1978	#21, 1978	Hideo Hijiri
Hit and Run (ヒット・エンド・ラン)	#9, 1978	#34, 1980	Hideo Aya
Ryokudo-kun (力童くん)	#14, 1978	#20, 1979	Yoshimoto Baron
Space Opera Chugaku (スペオペ宙学)	#37, 1978	#21, 1979	Go Nagai
Urusei Yatsura (うる星やつら)	#39, 1978	#8, 1987	Rumiko Takahashi
Seishun Dobutsuen Zoo (青春動物園ズウ)	#46, 1978	#43, 1981	Hiromi Yamasaki, Kazuo Koike
Futari no Shogun (二人のショーグン)	#1, 1979	#6, 1979	Osamu Tezuka
Bangai Koshien (番外甲子園)	#3/4, 1979	#5, 1982	Mamoru Uchiyama, Jūzo Yamasaki
Cyborg 009 (サイボーグ009)	#13, 1979	#11, 1981	Shotaro Ishinomori
Hotto Keddogu (ほっとけどっぐ)	#15, 1979	#26, 1979	Masaru Makino
Abare Taikai (あばれ大海)	#22, 1979	#42, 1979	Noboru Rokuda
Akkan Man (あっかんマン)	#26, 1979	#7, 1980	Shin Tamura
Goronbomatsu (ごろんぼ松)	#30, 1979	#52, 1979	Jirou Gyū, Keisuke Kyuju
Wanten Tantei (ワンテン探偵局)	#31, 1979	#42, 1979	Masaru Makino
Basubon Tokkyu (バスボン特急)	#39, 1979	#48, 1979	Kōichi Soratobi
Funsen Yodels (奮戦ヨーデルス)	#42, 1979	#52, 1979	Chisatoru Snow
Doro Fighter (ドロファイター)	#47, 1979	#8, 1981	Motoka Murakami
Dash Kappei (ダッシュ勝平)	#48, 1979	#48, 1982	Noboru Rokuda

== 1980s ==
=== 1980–1984 ===
Manga	First issue	Final issue	Manga artist
Uridase! Panpusu (売り出せ!パンプス)	#1, 1980	#9, 1980	Chisatoru Snow
Hockey Wolf (ホッケーウルフ)	#2, 1980	#19, 1980	Tatsuoki Kobayashi, Yo Takeyama
Otoko Oozora (男大空)	#3/4, 1980	#44, 1982	Ryoichi Ikegami, Tetsu Kariya
Seishun Knuckle 4 (青春ナックル4)	#5/6, 1980	#22, 1980	Haru Hosokawa
I Love Ayume (I LOVE あやめ)	#17, 1980	#26, 1980	Tsuhiro Kasugami
Pro Wrestling Superstar Retsuden (プロレススーパースター列伝)	#23, 1980	#26, 1983	Kunichika Harada, Ikki Kajiwara
Katte ni Yorimichi (かってに頼道)	#31, 1980	#52, 1980	Mitsuo Hashimoto
Super Rider (スーパーライダー)	#41, 1980	#27, 1982	Osamu Ishiwata
Tadaima Jugyouchuu! (ただいま授業中!)	#44, 1980	#8, 1983	Tsuguo Okazaki
Sayonara Sankaku (さよなら三角)	#4/5, 1981	#18, 1984	Hidenori Hara
Neri Wasabi Kyoso Kyoku (ネリわさび狂騒曲)	#9, 1981	#16, 1981	Kazuya Kimita
Dokkiri Doctor (どっきりドクター)	#14, 1981	#7, 1982	Fujihiko Hosono
Musashi no Ken (六三四の剣)	#17, 1981	#41, 1985	Motoka Murakami
Tokkyu GO! (特救GO!)	#18, 1981	#18, 1982	Takao Saito
Hashire! Haruma (はしれ!春馬)	#20, 1981	#29, 1981	Mitsuo Hashimoto
Ten Made Agare (天まであがれ)	#31, 1981	#20, 1982	Tatsuo Kanai, Sho Fumimura
Yuta Yanaika (勇太やないか)	#34, 1981	#21, 1982	Yasuichi Oshima
Touch (タッチ)	#36, 1981	#50, 1986	Mitsuru Adachi
Futari Daka (ふたり鷹)	#44, 1981	#32, 1985	Kaoru Shintani
Damekko Yuki-chan (ダメっ子ユキちゃん)	#46, 1981	#52, 1983	Shinmaru Sato
Pinto Pittashi! (ピントぴったし!)	#3/4, 1982	#37, 1983	Masayoshi Ishida
Ore wa Namazumono. (おれはナマズ者)	#6, 1982	#21, 1984	Mitsuo Hashimoto, Jūzō Yamasaki
Gu-Gu Ganmo (Gu-Guガンモ)	#19, 1982	#16, 1985	Fujihiko Hosono
Nanka Ayakai!? (なんか妖かい!?)	#21, 1982	#21, 1984	Kei Satomi, Hajime Kimura
Hashire Kakeru (はしれ走)	#22, 1982	#27, 1984	Takeshi Miya
Torai Torai (トライ・トライ)	#28, 1982	#47, 1982	Mamoru Uchiyama, Ryūji Mizutani
Hi no Tama Boy (火の玉ボーイ)	#32, 1982	#15, 1985	Osamu Ishiwata
Love Z (ラブZ)	#46, 1982	#33, 1984	Hiromi Yamasaki, Kazuo Koike
Kochantorei (こちゃんと礼)	#48, 1982	#15, 1983	Tomomi Ogata, Jirou Gyū
Dart Tokyu (ダート特急)	#49, 1982	#1/2, 1983	Yoshiaki Abiru
Sono Na mo Agaro (その名もあがろう)	#3/4, 1983	#33, 1983	Noboru Rokuda
Seiunji (星雲児)	#5, 1983	#11, 1984	Ryoichi Ikegami
Harumi 120% (春美120%)	#15, 1983	#23, 1984	Tsuguo Okazaki
Sono Ki ni Natte Mo (その気になっても)	#16, 1983	#47, 1983	Akihiko Tanimura
Green Grass (グリングラス)	#21, 1983	#10, 1984	Shōtarō Ishinomori
Honō no Tenkōsei (炎の転校生)	#31, 1983	#48, 1985	Kazuhiko Shimamoto
Yoki no Kamome (陽気なカモメ)	#38, 1983	#31, 1985	Noboru Rokuda
Blizzard Princess (ブリザート・プリンセス)	#1/2, 1984	#19, 1984	Kazuyoshi Suzumiya
No. 1 Linna (No.1リンナ)	#11, 1984	#30, 1984	Masayoshi Ishida
Fighting Sweeper (ふぁいてぃんぐSWEEPER)	#12, 1984	#30, 1984	Kenji Nakatsu
Megunchi Monogatari (メグんち物語)	#18, 1984	#42, 1984	Yuichi Ogata
Zingy	#22, 1984	#51, 1984	Atsushi Kamijo, Tetsu Kariya
Ao Kobushi Okami (青拳狼)	#24, 1984	#1, 1985	Ryoichi Ikegami, Hajime Kimura
Pro Wrestling Taishofu (プロレス大勝負)	#28, 1984	#37, 1984	Kunichika Harada
Shirobe (シロベ)	#29, 1984	#48, 1984	Takao Yaguchi
Just Meet (ジャストミート)	#30, 1984	#49, 1987	Hidenori Hara
Datsusen Gennen (奪戦元年)	#31, 1984	#10, 1985	Kei Satomi, Taku Hiura
Eichi Man (エイチマン)	#34, 1984	#36, 1984	Kōichirō Yasunaga
Ragnarok Guy (ラグナロック・ガイ)	#34, 1984	#52, 1985	Tsuguo Okazaki
Sprinter (スプリンター)	#46, 1984	#17, 1987	Yu Koyama
Harukana Bishi (はるかなビシ)	#49, 1984	#25, 1985	Takeshi Miya

=== 1985–1989 ===
Manga	First issue	Final issue	Manga artist
Suteki ni Yabanjin (ステキに野蛮人)	#3/4, 1985	#23, 1985	Kazuyoshi Suzumiya
Hound Eleven (ハウンドイレブン)	#5/6, 1985	#13, 1985	Kenji Okamura
Mai, the Psychic Girl (舞, Mai)	#14, 1985	#16, 1986	Ryoichi Ikegami, Kazuya Kudo
Night Bird (ないとバード)	#15, 1985	#30, 1986	Kei Satomi
To-y	#16, 1985	#15, 1987	Atsushi Kamijo
Chotto Yoroshiku (ちょっとヨロシク!)	#17, 1985	#20, 1987	Satoshi Yoshida
B.B.	#24, 1985	#9, 1991	Osamu Ishiwata
Aosora Floppy (青空ふろっぴぃ)	#33, 1985	#40, 1986	Fujihiko Hosono
Kyūkyoku Chōjin R (究極超人あ〜る)	#34, 1985	#32, 1987	Masami Yuki
Tenchi Muyo/This Side Up (天地無用)	#35, 1985	#23, 1986	Kenji Okamura, Jūzō Yamasaki
Rikugun Nakano Yobiko (陸軍中野予備校)	#42, 1985	#52, 1986	Kōichirō Yasunaga
Balancer (バランサー)	#43, 1985	#21, 1986	Kaoru Shintani
Kaze o Nuke! (風を抜け!)	#4/5, 1986	#29, 1988	Motoka Murakami
Moeru V (燃えるV)	#6, 1986	#52, 1986	Kazuhiko Shimamoto
Doki Doki Heartbeat (どきどきハートビート)	#22, 1986	#20, 1987	Tsuguo Okazaki
Panic Hoteishiki (パニック方程式)	#23, 1986	#9, 1987	Tetsuhiro Koshita
Ryū (リュウ)	#39, 1986	#1, 1988	Akira Oze, Masao Yajima
Tosho Boy (闘翔ボーイ)	#45, 1986	#27, 1988	Ryōji Ryūzaki
Happi Chokuzen (はっぴい直前)	#51, 1986	#7, 1988	Aki Katsu
I'm Namu (I'mナム)	#1, 1987	#31, 1987	Fujihiko Hosono
Smile for Mii (スマイルfor美衣)	#4/5, 1987	#15, 1989	Kei Satomi
Goal	#8, 1987	#25, 1987	Kenji Okamura
Bucchigiri (ぶっちぎり)	#9, 1987	#30, 1987	Yū Nakahara
Rough (ラフ)	#17, 1987	#40, 1989	Mitsuru Adachi
Totsugeki Wolf (とつげきウルフ)	#18, 1987	#41, 1987	Kazuhiko Shimamoto
Mermaid Saga (人魚シリーズ, Ningyo Shirīzu)	#22, 1987 (Note: First published in Shōnen Sunday Zōkan in 1984 and 1985. Stories published in Weekly Shōnen Sunday: "Mermaid Forest" (人魚の森, Ningyo no Mori) (1987); "Dream's End" (夢の終わり, Yume no Owari) (1988); "Promised Tomorrow" (約束の明日, Yakusoku no Ashita) (1990); "Mermaid's Scar" (人魚の傷, Ningyo no Kizu) (1992); "Eye of the Demon" (夜叉の瞳, Yasha no Hitomi) (1993); "The Last Face" (最後の顔, Saigo no Kao) (1994))	#8, 1994	Rumiko Takahashi
Aozora Shot (青空しょって)	#24, 1987	#51, 1991	Hideki Mori
Kotton Tetsumaru (こっとん鉄丸)	#24, 1987	#14, 1988	Tetsuo Aoki
Magic Kaito (まじっく快斗, Majikku Kaito)	#26, 1987	Present (Note: Published infrequently)	Gosho Aoyama
Joshi Chugakusei Note (女子中学生ノート)	#29, 1987	#51, 1987	Hideki Terashima
Bokura wa v3 (ぼくらは√3)	#32, 1987	#39, 1987	Satoru Matsumura
Koshien ga Suki! (甲子園が好き!)	#33, 1987	#38, 1987	Toshiyuki Mutsu
Kuruman BOY (くるまんBOY)	#35, 1987	#52, 1987	Katowa
Suiyo Bokenasu Shiteseki (水曜ぼけなす指定席)	#36, 1987	#50, 1987	Masahiko Kikuni
Ranma ½ (らんま1/2)	#36, 1987	#12, 1996	Rumiko Takahashi
Sports Tenko Mari (スポーツてんこ盛り)	#40, 1987	#52, 1989	Eiyu Aoyama
Kamen Rider Black (仮面ライダーBlack)	#41, 1987	#50, 1988	Shotaro Ishinomori
Chichi Monogatari Ono (父物語 斧)	#42, 1987	#21, 1988	Kei Honjo, Kazuyoshi Inaba, Noasobi Awa
Ayame ni Oteage! (あやめにお手上げ!)	#50, 1987	#2/3, 1988	Shimpei Itoh
Kogen Mura he Yokoso (高原村へようこそ)	#51, 1987	#19, 1988	Mio Murao
Dokachin Kid (どかちんきっど)	#1, 1988	#31, 1988	Shigeru Koshiba
Kenji (拳児)	#2/3, 1988	#5, 1992	Yoshihide Fujiwara, Ryuchi Matsuda
My Pace Futaro (マイペース風太郎)	#4/5, 1988	#43, 1988	Hidenori Hara
Bear Mader Ryusuke (ベアマーダー流介)	#15, 1988	#7, 1989	Kenji Okamura, Chiaki Hashiba
Mobile Police Patlabor (機動警察パトレイバー, Kidō Keisatsu Patoreibā)	#17, 1988	#23, 1994	Masami Yuki
Ucchare Goshogawara (うっちゃれ五所瓦)	#19, 1988	#29, 1991	Tsuyoshi Nakaima
Hikari Ikanga Gakuen (聖イカンガー学園)	#20, 1988	#46, 1988	Tomoaki Ogawa, Iwasaki Ikanga
Wind Up!! (ワインドアップ!!)	#20, 1988	#29, 1989	Yasuhiro Koizumi
Bimi Paradise (美味 (みみ パラダイス)	#27, 1988	#14, 1989	Kazuhiro Honma, Yuri Yumeno
Matador (マタドール)	#32, 1988	#53, 1988	Soichi Moto, Naotaka Taki
Bakkure Ippei (ばっくれ一平!)	#34, 1988	#7, 1990	Ryōji Ryūzaki
Makoto-chan (まことちゃん)	#37, 1988	#32, 1989	Kazuo Umezu
Tearful Soldier (望郷戦士)	#38, 1988	#51, 1989	Taku Kitazaki
Yaiba: Samurai Legend	#39, 1988	#50, 1993	Gosho Aoyama
Akai Pegasus II Sho (赤いペガサスII 翔)	#46, 1988	#42, 1989	Kiyokazu Chiba, Motoka Murakami
Obi o Gyutto Ne! (帯をギュッとね!)	#1/2, 1989	#52, 1995	Katsutoshi Kawai
Heavy (ヘヴィ)	#3/4, 1989	#31, 1990	Motoka Murakami
Free Kick! (フリーキック!)	#7, 1989	#39, 1990	Hidenori Hara
Spriggan (スプリガン)	#10, 1989	#51, 1989 (Note: Transferred to Shōnen Sunday Zōkan)	Ryōji Minagawa, Hiroshi Takashige
Dr. Shiina no Kyoikuteki Shido!! (Dr.椎名の教育的指導!!)	#14, 1989	#34, 1989	Takashi Shiina
Mad Stone	#15, 1989	#33, 1989	Hidehisa Masaki
Tuck In (タックイン)	#16, 1989	#33, 1989	Masahiro Suzuki, Tomohiko Tanikawa
Dinosaur Carnival (恐竜カーニバル)	#17, 1989	#30, 1992	Etsuko Ueda
Kenta Yarimasu! (健太やります!)	#30, 1989	#24, 1994	Takuya Mitsuda
Shōnen (少年)	#32, 1989	#39, 1989	Yū Koyama, Masao Yajima
Ninkimono de Iko (人気者でいこう)	#35, 1989	#32, 1990	Yū Nakahara
Terrible Shōnen-dan (てりぶる少年団)	#36, 1989	#47, 1989	Miki Tori
Hoshikuzu Paradise (星くずパラダイス)	#37, 1989	#43, 1991	Aki Katsu
DaDa!	#44, 1989	#38, 1991	Satoshi Yoshida
Geo-Police Joe (ジオポリスジョー)	#48, 1989	#19, 1990	Kei Satomi
Mash (マッシュ)	#50, 1989	#38, 1990	Takatoshi Yamada
Otokichi-kun no Piano Monogatari (音吉くんのピアノ物語)	#52, 1989	#9, 1992	Reiko Hayashi

== 1990s ==
=== 1990–1994 ===
Manga	First issue	Final issue	Manga artist
Niji-iro Tōgarashi (虹色とうがらし)	#4/5, 1990	#19, 1992	Mitsuru Adachi
Ushio & Tora (うしおととら, Ushio to Tora)	#6, 1990	#45, 1996	Kazuhiro Fujita
Amaku Kiken na Nampa Deka (甘く危険なナンパ刑事)	#12, 1990	#37, 1990	Hiroyuki Nishimori
Welcome (ウエルカム)	#16, 1990	#25, 1990	Migio Yanagisawa
Unoken no Bakuhatsu Ugyaa!! (ウノケンの爆発ウギャー!!)	#17, 1990	#40, 1991	Kenichi Unose
Tatoeba Konna Love Song (たとえばこんなラヴ・ソング)	#28, 1990	#50, 1991	Taku Kitazaki
Tough	#33, 1990	#31, 1991	Yū Nakahara
Baron (バロン)	#36, 1990	#7, 1993	Noboru Rokuda
Chiku Chiku Uni Uni (ちくちくウニウニ)	#38, 1990	#10, 1992	Sensha Yoshida
Kyō Kara Ore Wa!! (今日から俺は!!)	#40, 1990 (Note: Transferred from Shōnen Sunday Zōkan)	#47, 1997	Hiroyuki Nishimori
Heavy Metal Koshien (HEAVY METAL甲子園)	#46, 1990	#34, 1991	Nonki Miyasu
Twinkle Twinkle Idol Star (♂ティンクル2♀アイドル☆スター)	#2/3, 1991	#16, 1993	Hikaru Tohyama
Pati-Pati	#4/5, 1991	#15, 1991	Yume Matsumura
Very Good Manten!! (very good満天!!)	#14, 1991	#40, 1991	Atsuo Kuwasawa
Go!! Southern Ice Hockey Club (行け!!南国アイスホッケー部)	#15, 1991	#34, 1996	Kōji Kumeta
Samurai Crusader (王立院雲丸の生涯, Oritsuin Kunomaru no Shogai)	#28, 1991	#12, 1992	Ryoichi Ikegami, Oji Hiroi
Ghost Sweeper Mikami (GS美神 極楽大作戦!!, Gōsuto Suīpā Mikami Gokuraku Taisakusen!!)	#30, 1991	#41, 1999	Takashi Shiina
Sengoku Koshien: Kyū inu-shi densetsu (戦国甲子園〜九犬士伝説〜)	#33, 1991	#27, 1992	Kōji Kiriyama
Makasete Eruna (まかせてエルナ)	#35/36, 1991	#44, 1991	Kaoru Yamada
Lucky Guy (ラッキーボーイ)	#41, 1991	#47, 1991	Yokoshima Shunpu
Fullmetal Boxer (フルメタルボクサー)	#44, 1991	#1/2, 1992	Tatsuyoshi Kobayashi, Hiroshi Oda
Hono no Ninjaman (炎のニンジャマン)	#51, 1991	#42, 1992	Kazuhiko Shimamoto
Chōryū Senki Sauros Knight (超龍戦記ザウロスナイト)	#1/2, 1992	#10, 1993	Aki Katsu
Our Field of Dreams (俺たちのフィールド, Oretachi no Field)	#3/4, 1992	#45, 1998	Kenichi Muraeda
Kakutou Oumonogo Byun Boy (格闘王物語 ビュンBOY)	#7, 1992	#39, 1992	Keisuke Niwa, Yasushi Hironaka
Tokon Shojo (闘魂少女(バトルガール))	#8, 1992	#34, 1992	Fumihiro Hayashizaki
Ojisan Boy!! Shogaku Chugakusei (おじさんBOY!!小学中学生)	#11, 1992	#41, 1992	Seiji Watanabe
Kotei Senshi Hankyu (皇帝戦士 斑鳩)	#16, 1992	#28, 1992	Ami Saitō, Masaru Miyazuki
Hiten Boso Densho Maoh (飛天暴走伝承MAOH)	#17, 1992	#52, 1993	Etsuya Amajishi, Sasuke Oigshima
Futari (ふ・た・り)	#18, 1992	#43, 1993	Taku Kitazaki
Tokio (トキオ)	#19, 1992	#32, 1993	Yū Nakahara
Geki Saru Theater (激猿シアター)	#28, 1992	#52, 1992	Shigenobu Kaminishizono
H2	#32, 1992	#50, 1999	Mitsuru Adachi
Jodan Jyanai yo! (ジョーダンじゃないよ!)	#35/36, 1992	#47, 1994	Muneo Saito
Jesus (ジーザス)	#42, 1992	#20, 1995	Yoshihide Fujiwara, Kyoichi Nanatsuki
Ossu! Shorenji (オッス!少林寺)	#43, 1992	#17, 1994	Hiroyuki Kikuta
Geki Tori Theater (激鳥シアター)	#1/2, 1993	#52, 1993	Shigenobu Kaminishizono
Gakuen Teikoku Ore wa Jubei! (学園帝国 俺はジュウベイ!)	#3/4, 1993	#46, 1993	Masahiko Nakahira, Ōji Hiroi
Itadakimasu! (いただきます!)	#8, 1993	#19, 1996	Takatoshi Yamada
Osaruna Masaru-kun (おさるなまさるくん)	#13, 1993	#48, 1994	Kiyoshi Hasegawa
BF Fish Boys (B・Fフィッシュボーイズ)	#21/22, 1993	#10, 1994	Kengo Kimura
Love	#35/36, 1993	#10, 1999	Osamu Ishiwata
Uwasa no Otokomae (噂の男前)	#52, 1993	#35, 1996	Satoshi Yoshida
Shout!	#37, 1994	#2/3, 1995	Yozo Shimizu
Geki Inu Theater (激犬シアター)	#1/2, 1994	#28, 1994	Shigenobu Kaminishizono
Drum Knuckle: Final Fight (DRAM拳-ファイナルファイト-)	#3/4, 1994	#42, 1994	Shinobu Inokuma, Toshiki Inoue
Case Closed / Detective Conan (名探偵コナン, Meitantei Konan)	#5, 1994	Present	Gosho Aoyama
Mugen Zero (無限・ゼロ)	#10, 1994	#16, 1994	Eiji Kawakubo
Masurao Hiongiseiki (ますらお〜秘本義経記〜)	#14, 1994	#3/4, 1996	Taku Kitazaki
R Princess	#23, 1994	#1, 1995	Nobuyuki Anzai
Ganba! Fly High (ガンバ!Fly high)	#25, 1994	#45, 2000	Hiroyuki Kikuta, Shinji Morisue
Major	#33, 1994	#32, 2010	Takuya Mitsuda
Jaja Uma Grooming Up! (じゃじゃ馬グルーミン★UP!)	#44, 1994	#42, 2000	Masami Yuki

=== 1995–1999 ===
Manga	First issue	Final issue	Manga artist
Aho Aho Gakuen (アホアホ学園)	#1, 1995	#49, 1996	Aoba Hisayoshi
Tokyo Bancho (東京番長)	#2/3, 1995	#19, 1997	Keisuke Suzuki
Sabaku no Yakyubu (砂漠の野球部)	#5/6, 1995	#14, 1997	Jōkura Kōji
Go-Go Ecchan no Caster Mairuzo! (ゴーゴーえっちゃんのキャスター参るゾ!)	#13, 1995	#49, 1995	Takashi Hashiguchi
Dan Doh!!	#15, 1995	#30, 2000	Daichi Banjō, Nobuhiro Sakata
Flame of Recca (烈火の炎, Rekka no Honō)	#16, 1995	#9, 2002	Nobuyuki Anzai
Enya Kodomo Ninpocho (エンヤ KODOMO忍法帖)	#21/22, 1995	#20, 1998	Hiromi Morishita
Dolphin Brain (ドルフィン・ブレイン)	#35, 1995	#50, 1995	Reiji Yamada
Firefighter! Daigo of Fire Company M (め組の大吾, Megumi no Daigo)	#38, 1995	#27, 1999	Masahito Soda
Warp Boy (ワープボーイ)	#1, 1996	#36/37, 1996	Tokihiko Matsuura, Kazuhiko Arao
Accidents (アクシデンツ -事故調クジラの事件簿-)	#5/6, 1996	#41, 1998	Takatoshi Yamada
Shinsei Motemote Ōkoku (神聖モテモテ王国)	#15, 1996	#9, 2000	Ken Nagai
Nagisa Me Kounin (なぎさMe公認)	#16, 1996	#34, 1999	Taku Kitazaki
Hikenden Kira (秘拳伝キラ)	#20, 1996	#5/6, 1997	Yuki Miyoshi, Takeru Aose
Monkey Turn (モンキーターン)	#36/37, 1996	#3, 2005	Katsutoshi Kawai
Taiyo no Senshi Boka Boka (太陽の戦士ポカポカ)	#36, 1996	#39, 1997	Kōji Kumeta
Inuyasha (犬夜叉)	#50, 1996	#29, 2008	Rumiko Takahashi
Gain (ゲイン)	#1, 1997	#35, 1998	Tsuyoshi Nakaima
Mo Sungoi!! (もぅスンゴイ!!)	#4, 1997	#48, 1997	Hirotatsu Minami
Fancy Zatsuwazadan (ファンシー雑技団)	#4, 1997	#8, 1999	Junichi Kuroba
Tuxedo Gin (タキシード銀, Gin Takashiido)	#15, 1997	#7, 2000	Tokihiko Matsuura
Project ARMS (ARMS)	#16, 1997	#20, 2002	Ryōji Minagawa, Kyoichi Nanatsuki
Karakuri Circus (からくりサーカス, Karakuri Sākasu)	#32, 1997	#26, 2006	Kazuhiro Fujita
Devil & Devil (デビデビ)	#41, 1997	#40, 2000	Yuki Miyoshi
The Wind of Fight (風の伝承者)	#14, 1998	#11, 2000	Satoshi Yamamoto, Kazuto Wakakuwa
Katteni Kaizō (かってに改蔵)	#21/22, 1998	#34, 2004	Kōji Kumeta
Spin Out (スピンナウト)	#35, 1998	#24, 1999	Hiroyuki Nishimori, Santa Harukaze
Salad Days	#48, 1998	#48, 2001 (Note: Transferred from Shōnen Sunday Super)	Shinobu Inokuma
Tokyo Keiji (東京刑事)	#5/6, 1999	#22/23, 1999	Keisuke Suzuki
Ayumu no Koma (歩武の駒)	#14, 1999	#16, 2000	Kazuhiro Murakawa
Men Soul!!! (漢魂!!!(メンソウル))	#16, 1999	#4/5, 2001	Hirotatsu Minami
Dainamu Itou! (ダイナマ伊藤!)	#17, 1999	#47, 2002	Pero Sugimoto
Kamoshika! (かもしか！)	#22/23, 1999	#35, 2000	Kenichi Muraeda
Passport Blue (パスポート・ブルー)	#24, 1999	#38, 2001	Osamu Ishiwata
Cheeky Angel (天使な小生意気, Tenshi na konamaiki)	#25, 1999	#36/37, 2003	Hiroyuki Nishimori
Fantasista (ファンタジスタ)	#35, 1999	#14, 2004	Michiteru Kusaba

== 2000s ==
=== 2000–2004 ===
Manga	First issue	Final issue	Manga artist
Marvelous (マーベラス)	#1, 2000	#47, 2000	Yūji Takemura
Libero Revolution (リベロ革命!!)	#4/5, 2000	#18, 2002	Motoyuki Tanaka
Mister Japan (MISTERジパング)	#14, 2000	#46, 2001	Takashi Shiina
Brave Saru s (ブレイブ猿s)	#17, 2000	#36, 2000	Tokihiko Matsūra
Itsumo Misora (いつも美空)	#22/23, 2000	#24, 2001	Mitsuru Adachi
Dobutsu no Kame-chan (動物のカメちゃん)	#31, 2000	#52, 2002	Kenji Sosai
Dan Doh!! Xi	#32, 2000	#19, 2003	Daichi Banjō, Nobuhiro Sakata
Togari (トガリ)	#36, 2000	#11, 2002	Yoshinori Natsume
Omunehari (大棟梁)	#37/38, 2000	#4/5, 2001	Shinji Saijyo
Takeru Michi (タケル道)	#39, 2000	#16, 2001	Naoya Ogawa, Yaeko Yamato
Punyarin (プニャリン)	#44, 2000	#36/37, 2001	Joukura Koji
Bullet (ブリット)	#1, 2001	#19, 2001	Yuki Miyoshi
Night Lovers (ナイトラヴァーズ)	#4/5, 2001	#33, 2001	Yozo Shimizu, Kentaro Fumizuki
Zatch Bell! (金色のガッシュ!!, Konjiki no Gash Bell!!)	#6, 2001	#4/5, 2008	Makoto Raiku
Rising Sun (ライジング・サン)	#17, 2001	#46, 2001	Tokihiko Matsūra, Buronson
HORIZON	#20, 2001	#33, 2002	Hiroyuki Kikuta
Pangea no Musume Kunie (パンゲアの娘 KUNIE)	#21-22, 2001	#30, 2002	Masami Yuki
Iruka!! (いるか!!)	#25, 2001	#30, 2001	Takashi Tanabe
The Law of Ueki (うえきの法則, Ueki no Hōsoku)	#34, 2001	#46, 2004	Tsubasa Fukuchi
Do! Rill!! (どりる)	#35, 2001	#30, 2002	Yugo Ishikawa
Katsu!	#36/37, 2001	#12, 2005	Mitsuru Adachi
Senpuu no Tachibana (旋風の橘)	#2/3, 2002	#1, 2003	Shinobu Inokuma
Yakitate!! Japan (焼きたて!!ジャぱん)	#4/5, 2002	#6, 2007	Takashi Hashiguchi
365 no Yuki (365歩のユウキ)	#6, 2002	#43, 2002	Shinji Saijyo
Kenichi: The Mightiest Disciple (史上最強の弟子ケンイチ, Shijō Saikyō no Deshi Kenichi)	#20, 2002	#42, 2014	Syun Matsuena
Ichiban-yu Kanata (一番湯のカナタ)	#21/22, 2002	#2, 2003	Takashi Shiina
Otori Bomber (鳳ボンバー)	#23, 2002	#21, 2003	Motoyuki Tanaka
Idejuu! (いでじゅう!)	#33, 2002	#30, 2005	Moritaishi
Fight no Akatsuki (ふぁいとの暁)	#35, 2002	#1, 2004	Takao Aoyagi
Kimi no Kakera (きみのカケラ)	#38, 2002	#14, 2004 (Note: Two additional chapters were published in 2010 and 2013)	Shin Takahashi
Midori Days (美鳥の日々, Midori no Hibi)	#42, 2002	#34, 2004	Kazurou Inoue
D-Live!!	#44, 2002	#18, 2006	Ryōji Minagawa
Wild Life (ワイルドライフ, Wairudo Raifu)	#2, 2003	#8, 2008	Masato Fujisaki
Shonen Thunder (少年サンダー)	#3, 2003	#8, 2003	Yukio Katayama
MÄR	#6, 2003	#31, 2006	Nobuyuki Anzai
Ore-sama wa? (俺様は?(なぞ))	#7, 2003	#3, 2005	Pero Sugimoto
Denjin 1 Gō (電人1号)	#12, 2003	#19, 2003	Junichi Kurobayama
Kuromatsu - The Nobelest (黒松・ザ・ノーベレスト)	#20, 2003	#25, 2003	Naoki Mizuguchi
Uttare Daikichi! (売ったれダイキチ!)	#22/23, 2003	#8, 2004	Yūji Takemura, Kazuto Wakakuwa
Robot Boys (ロボットボーイズ)	#32, 2003	#10, 2004	Atsushi Kamikawa, Kyoichi Nanatsuki
Rakugaki Fighter ~Hero of Saint Paint~ (楽ガキFighter)	#34, 2003	#2, 2004	Kunihiko Nakai
Kekkaishi (結界師)	#47, 2003	#19, 2011	Yellow Tanabe
Kaikisenban! Juugorou (怪奇千万!十五郎)	#3, 2004	#20, 2004	Eiji Kawakubo
Codename Babyface (暗号名はBF)	#7, 2004	#37, 2004	Hosana Tanaka
Kowashiyagamon (こわしや我聞)	#11, 2004	#52, 2005	Shun Fujiki
Shishunki Keiji Minoru Kobayashi (思春期刑事 ミノル小林)	#13, 2004	#31, 2005	Naoki Mizuguchi
Dan Doh!! Next Generation (DAN DOH!! 〜ネクストジェネレーション〜)	#17, 2004	#1, 2005	Daichi Banjou, Nobuhiro Sakata
Dōshirō de Gozaru (道士郎でござる)	#22/23, 2004	#5/6, 2006	Hiroyuki Nishimori
Kurozakuro (クロザクロ)	#35, 2004	#1, 2006	Yoshinori Natsume
Toyuki (東遊記)	#38, 2004	#22/23, 2005	Yohei Sakai
Hayate the Combat Butler (ハヤテのごとく!, Hayate no Gotoku!)	#45, 2004	#20, 2017	Kenjiro Hata

=== 2005–2009 ===
Manga	First issue	Final issue	Manga artist
Saikyō! Toritsu Aoizaka Kōkō Yakyūbu (最強!都立あおい坂高校野球部)	#6, 2005	#20, 2010	Motoyuki Tanaka
Ayakashido Horai (あやかし堂のホウライ)	#7, 2005	#13, 2005	Tatsuya Kaneda, Kazuhiro Fujita
Ani-Funjatta! (兄ふんじゃった!)	#9, 2005	#4/5, 2008	Shin Ogasawara
Blizzard Axel (ブリザードアクセル)	#15, 2005	#27, 2007	Nakaba Suzuki
Miagete Goran (見上げてごらん)	#16, 2005	#45, 2006	Michiteru Kusaba
The Law of Ueki Plus (うえきの法則プラス, Ueki no Hōsoku Purasu)	#19, 2005	#29, 2007	Tsubasa Fukuchi
Cross Game (クロスゲーム)	#22/23, 2005	#12, 2010	Mitsuru Adachi
Neko Navi (ネコなび)	#31, 2005	#36/37, 2007	Pero Sugimoto
Ai Kora (あいこら)	#32, 2005	#10, 2008	Kazurou Inoue
Zettai Karen Children (絶対可憐チルドレン, Zettai Karen Chirudoren)	#33, 2005	#33, 2021	Takashi Shiina
Hijiri Kessho Albatross (聖結晶アルバトロス)	#1, 2006	#51, 2006	Tamiki Wagaki
Chitei Shonen Chappy (地底少年チャッピー)	#2, 2006	#41, 2006	Naoki Mizuguchi
Grandliner (グランドライナー)	#3/4, 2006	#11, 2006	Masanori Yoshida
Harunokuni (ハルノクニ)	#12, 2006	#50, 2006	Hiro Nakamichi, Myo Hamanaka
BakéGyamon (妖逆門)	#13, 2006	#16, 2007	Kazuhiro Fujita, Mitsuhisa Tamura
Bushin (武心)	#14, 2006	#12, 2007	Daichi Banjou
Golden Age	#21/22, 2006	#2/3, 2009	Kazuyuki Samukawa
Rangeman	#27, 2006	#39, 2007	Moritaishi
Cirque du Freak (ダレン・シャン, Darren Shan)	#36/37, 2006	#10, 2009	Takahiro Arai, Darren Shan
MÄR Ω	#39, 2006	#28, 2007	Kōichirō Hoshino, Nobuyuki Anzai
Tasukete! Flower Man (助けて!フラワーマン)	#46, 2006	#1, 2007	Omi Kaneyama
Ifrit: Danzai no Enjin (イフリート〜断罪の炎人〜)	#2/3, 2007	#40, 2008	Masanori Yoshida
Gamble! (ギャンブルッ!)	#4/5, 2007	#16, 2009	Mitsuru Kaga
Marine Hunter (マリンハンター)	#10, 2007	#26, 2008	Shiro Otsuka
Ocha Nigosu (お茶にごす。)	#18, 2007	#35, 2009	Hiroyuki Nishimori
Meteorite Breed (メテオド)	#19, 2007	#7, 2008	Haruka Shii
Maoh: Juvenile Remix (魔王 JUVENILE REMIX)	#27, 2007	#30, 2009	Megumi Osuka, Kōtarō Isaka
Dive!!	#28, 2007	#27, 2008	Masahiro Ikeno, Eto Mori
Obou Samba (お坊サンバ!!)	#29, 2007	#47, 2009	Kousuke Ijima
Mari to Koinu no Monogatari (マリと子犬の物語)	#38, 2007	#45, 2007	Yu Tamenaga, Shinji Kuwabara, Ikkyo Ono
Kunai Den (クナイ伝)	#46, 2007	#32, 2008	Iori Tabasa
Kongō Banchō (金剛番長)	#47, 2007	#15, 2010	Nakaba Suzuki
Saijō no Meii (最上の命医)	#1, 2008	#13, 2010	Kenzō Irie, Takashi Hashiguchi
Lost+Brain	#2/3, 2008	#31, 2008	Akira Ootani
Hyde & Closer (呪法解禁!! ハイド&クローサー)	#4/5, 2008	#1, 2009 (Note: Transferred to Club Sunday)	Haro Aso
Moonlight Act (月光条例, Gekko Jorei)	#17, 2008	#19, 2014	Kazuhiro Fujita
Onidere (オニデレ)	#18, 2008	#12, 2011	Crystal na Yōsuke
The World God Only Knows (神のみぞ知るセカイ, Kami Nomi zo Shiru Sekai)	#19, 2008	#21, 2014	Tamiki Wakaki
Mixim 11	#21/22, 2008	#10, 2011	Nobuyuki Anzai
Traumeister (トラウマイスタ)	#29, 2008	#28, 2009	Atsushi Nakayama
Mitsuboshi no Speciality (★★★のスペシャリテ)	#30, 2008	#30, 2009	Go Yako
Artist Acro (アーティスト アクロ)	#31, 2008	#47, 2009 (Note: Transferred to Club Sunday)	Ato Sakurai
King Golf	#36/37, 2008	#46, 2011 (Note: Transferred to Shōnen Sunday S)	Sasaki Takeshi
Arata: The Legend (アラタ カンガタリ〜革神語〜, Arata Kangatari)	#44, 2008	#21, 2022 (Note: Transferred to Sunday Webry)	Yuu Watase
Hajimete no Aku (はじめてのあく)	#6, 2009	#25, 2012	Shun Fujiki
Itsuwaribito (いつわりびと◆空◆, Itsuwari Bito - Utsuho)	#9, 2009	#11, 2010 (Note: Transferred to Club Sunday)	Yuuki Iinuma
Yaoyoroo! (やおよろっ!)	#11, 2009	#26, 2009 (Note: Transferred to Club Sunday)	Natsumin
Defense Devil	#19, 2009	#28, 2011	Youn In-Wan, Yang Kyung-Il
Rin-ne (境界のRINNE, Kyōkai no Rinne)	#21/22, 2009	#3/4, 2018	Rumiko Takahashi
Magi: The Labyrinth of Magic (マギ, Magi)	#27, 2009	#46, 2017	Shinobu Ohtaka
Denno Yuki Club (電脳遊戯クラブ)	#29, 2009 (Note: Later published as Katsu!! Washi ga Shishōze Yo! (喝!!ワシが師匠ぜよ!) from Issue #52, 2010)	#10, 2011	Shin Ogasawara
Jio to Ôgon to Kinjirareta Mahô (ジオと黄金と禁じられた魔法)	#33, 2009	#9, 2010	Ayumi Kirihata
Tomorrows	#45, 2009	#32, 2010	Shinjin Deguchi
Tour! (ツール!, Tsuuru!)	#49, 2009	#46, 2010 (Note: Transferred to Club Sunday)	Akira Otani

== 2010s ==
=== 2010–2014 ===
Manga	First issue	Final issue	Manga artist
Arago: London Shikei Tokushu Hanzai Sōsakan (AR∀GO -ロンドン市警特殊犯罪捜査官-)	#4/5, 2010	#43, 2011	Takahiro Arai
Kunisaki Izumo no Jijō (國崎出雲の事情)	#7, 2010	#17, 2014	Aya Hirakawa
Kaitai Shinsho 0 (怪体真書Ø)	#14, 2010	#21, 2011 (Note: Transferred to Club Sunday)	Chiyo Kenmotsu
T.R.A.P.	#16, 2010	#15, 2011 (Note: Transferred to Club Sunday)	Eko Yamatoya
Saijo no Meii: The King of Neet (最上の明医〜ザ・キング・オブ・ニート〜)	#18, 2010	#22/23, 2014	Kenzō Irie, Takashi Hashiguchi
Sengoku Yatagarasu (戦国八咫烏)	#25, 2010	#2, 2012	Hirokazu Kobayashi
Kōtetsu no Hanappashira (鋼鉄の華っ柱)	#44, 2010	#41, 2012	Hiroyuki Nishimori
Saijo wa? Straight!! (最後は?ストレート!!)	#47, 2010	#6, 2014 (Note: Transferred to Shōnen Sunday S)	Kazuyuki Samukawa
Chiisai Hito: Aoba Jidō Sōdanjo Monogatari (ちいさいひと 青葉児童相談所物語)	#49, 2010	#29, 2012 (Note: Transferred to Shōnen Sunday S)	Mitsuhiro Mizuno, Jin Kyōchikutō
Jōjū Senjin!! Mushibugyo (常住戦陣!!ムシブギョー)	#6, 2011	#43, 2017	Hiroshi Fukuda
Be Blues! – Ao ni Nare (BE BLUES!〜青になれ〜)	#9, 2011	#46, 2022	Motoyuki Tanaka
Bestiarius (闘獣士 ベスティアリウス)	#11, 2011	#14, 2015 (Note: Transferred to Shōnen Sunday S)	Masasumi Kakizaki
Nozomi to Kimio (ノゾミとキミオ)	#12, 2011	#14, 2011	Wakō Honna
Runway o ? Produce!! (ランウェイを☆プロデュース!!)	#14, 2011	#20, 2011	Kiyoko Arai
Pocket Monsters RéBURST (ポケットモンスター RéBURST, Poketto Monsutā RiBĀSUTO)	#15, 2011	#45, 2012	Mitsuhisa Tamura, Jin Kusude
Buyuden	#16, 2011	#9, 2014	Takuya Mitsuda
Osumojii! Tsukasa no Ikkan (おすもじっ!◆司の一貫◆)	#17, 2011	#16, 2013 (Note: Transferred to Club Sunday)	Hirofumi Katou, Mitsuru Kaga
Silver Spoon (銀の匙, Gin no Saji)	#19, 2011	#52, 2019	Hiromu Arakawa
Inubu! Bokura no Shippo Senki (犬部! -ボクらのしっぽ戦記-)	#26, 2011	#32, 2013	Haruki Takakura, Yuka Katano
Waza no Tabibito (技の旅人)	#43, 2011	#44, 2011	Syun Matsuena
Gan-Kon (GAN☆KON)	#46, 2011	#38, 2012 (Note: Transferred to Club Sunday)	Kenji Sugawara
Anagle Mole (アナグルモール)	#47, 2011	#6, 2014	Tsubasa Fukuchi
Ultimate Otaku Teacher (電波教師, Denpa Kyoushi)	#49, 2011	#18, 2017	Takeshi Azuma
Hime Hajike (ひめはじけ)	#10, 2012	#51, 2012	Crystal na Yousuke
Area D: Inō Ryōiki (AREA D 異能領域)	#15, 2012	#8, 2016	Kyōichi Nanatsuki, Yang Kyung-il
Koakumaouden Senkore! (小悪魔王伝 戦コレ!)	#19, 2012	#41, 2012	Noriyuki Konishi, Kyoichi Nanatsuki
Tadashii Kodomo no Tsukurikata! (正しいコドモの作り方)	#21/22, 2012	#42, 2013	Marita Morita, Takayoshi Kuroda
Nadeshiko no Kiseki Kawasumi Nahomi Monogatari (なでしこのキセキ 川澄奈穂美物語)	#24, 2012	#28, 2012	Eko Yamatoya
AKB48 Satsujin Jiken (AKB48殺人事件)	#31, 2012	#41, 2012	Masaki Gotō, Gosho Aoyama
Alice in Borderland: Side Stories (今際の国のアリス特別編, Imawa no Kuni no Arisu Tokubetsu-hen) (Note: Six additional stories to the Alice in Borderland manga, published between 2012 and 2015. List of stories: "Four of Hearts" (はあとのよん, Haato no Yon) (2012); "Four of Clubs" (くらぶのよん, Kurabu no Yon) (2013); "Six of Diamonds" (だいやのろく, Daiya no Roku) (2013); "Seven of Spades" (すぺえどのなな, Supēdo no Nana) (2013); "King of Spades" (すぺえどのきんぐ, Supēdo no Kingu) (2013–14); "King of Diamonds" (だいやのきんぐ, Daiya no Kingu) (2014–15))	#32, 2012	#10, 2015	Haro Aso
Duel Masters Rev.	#39, 2012	#32, 2013	Shinsuke Takahashi, Shido Kanzaki
Ane Log: Moyako Nēsan no Tomaranai Monologue (姉ログ 靄子姉さんの止まらないモノローグ)	#42, 2012	#21, 2016	Kenji Taguchi
Fantasista Stella (ファンタジスタ ステラ)	#45, 2012	#38, 2015	Michiteru Kusaba
Sasami-san@Ganbaranai (ささみさん@がんばらない)	#46, 2012	#23, 2013 (Note: Transferred to Shōnen Sunday S)	Akira Nishikawa
Laughter at the World's End (終末のラフター, Shūmatsu no Laughter)	#51, 2012	#4/5, 2013	Yellow Tanabe
Character Times (キャラクタイムズ)	#6, 2013	#34, 2015	Fujiminosuke Yorozuya
Magical Star Kanon 100% (マジカル☆スターかのん100%)	#15, 2013	#17, 2013	Tamiki Wakaki
Nobelu (NOBELU-演-)	#16, 2013	#50, 2014	Ken Yoshida, Shinji Nojima
Chōsuinō Kei (超推脳 KEI)	#17, 2013	#31, 2014	Yoshiki Tanaka, Kazuo Gomi
Magi: Adventure of Sinbad (マギ シンドバッドの冒険, Magi: Shindobaddo no Bōken)	#23, 2013	#30, 2013 (Note: Transferred to Ura Sunday)	Yoshifumi Ohtera, Shinobu Ohtaka
Birdmen (バードメン)	#33, 2013	#10, 2020	Yellow Tanabe
Keijo!!!!!!!! (競女!!!!!!!!)	#34, 2013	#22/23, 2017	Daichi Sorayomi
Kokushi Musō!! (國士無双!!)	#35, 2013	#26, 2014	Kazuki Tajima
Yugami-kun ni wa Tomodachi ga Inai (湯神くんには友達がいない)	#48, 2013 (Note: Transferred from Shōnen Sunday S)	#25, 2019	Jun Sakura
Hyōkyūhime × Tokiwagi Kantoku no Kajō na Aijō (氷球姫×常磐木監督の過剰な愛情)	#49, 2013	#18, 2015	Haruka Ono
Chrono Monochrome (クロノ・モノクローム)	#1, 2014	#1, 2015	Jingetsu Isomi
Kiriwo Terrible (キリヲテリブレ)	#14, 2014	#1, 2015	Hiro Morita
Nanimo nai Kedo Sora wa Aoi (何もないけど空は青い)	#16, 2014	#38, 2015	Hiroyuki Nishimori, Yuuki Iinuma
Captain Earth (キャプテン・アース)	#19, 2014	#45, 2014 (Note: Transferred to Club Sunday)	Hiroshi Nakanishi
Ginpaku no Paladin: Seikishi (銀白のパラディン -聖騎士-)	#22/23, 2014	#24, 2015	Keisuke Oka
Heavens Runner Akira (ヘブンズランナー アキラ)	#24, 2014	#48, 2015	Hikaru Nikaidō
Nozo × Kimi (ノゾ×キミ)	#26, 2014 (Note: Transferred from Shōnen Sunday S)	#20, 2015	Wakō Honna
Eiga to Tenshi (EとT。〜えいがとてんし。〜)	#27, 2014	#34, 2015	Ippei Nekosuna
Dagashi Kashi (だがしかし)	#30, 2014	#20, 2018	Kotoyama
Psyche Matashitemo (サイケまたしても, Saike Mata Shitemo)	#32, 2014	#4/5, 2019	Tsubasa Fukuchi
Sensō Gejikō (戦争劇場)	#36/37, 2014	#45, 2015	Dousei Fujiko
Dezicon (デジコン)	#40, 2014	#15, 2015	Tomohito Oda
Oishii Kamishama (おいしい神しゃま)	#43, 2014	#48, 2015	Tooru Fujisawa

=== 2015–2019 ===
Manga	First issue	Final issue	Manga artist
Tokiwa Kitareri!! (トキワ来たれり!!)	#1, 2015	#28, 2017	Syun Matsuena
Drea-mer (ドリー・マー, Dorī mā)	#2/3, 2015	#40, 2015	Bakohajime
Tenshi to Akuto!! (天使とアクト!!)	#4/5, 2015	#27, 2018	Aya Hirakawa
Ritasu 2-kobun no Suteki (レタス2個分のステキ)	#6, 2015	#46, 2015	Hikaru Tanaka
Rion-san, Meiwakadesu (リオンさん、迷惑です。)	#7, 2015	#42, 2015	Shinya Urayama
Saezuri High School OK-Bu! (さえずり高校OK部!)	#8, 2015	#47, 2015	Isshiki Miho
Major 2nd	#15, 2015	Present	Takuya Mitsuda
Alice in Borderland (今際の国のアリス, Imawa no Kuni no Arisu)	#19, 2015 (Note: Transferred from Shōnen Sunday S)	#14, 2016	Haro Aso
Nanoha Yougashiten no Ii Shigoto (なのは洋菓子店のいい仕事)	#19, 2015	#48, 2016	Tamiki Wakaki
Tutti!	#22/23, 2015	#52, 2015	Ryo Katagiri
And-Pair (アンペア, An Pea)	#27, 2015	#2, 2016	Gōta Yamanaka, Yusuke Hori
Character Times Golden (キャラクタイムズゴールデン, Kyaraku Taimuzu Gōruden)	#35, 2015	#30, 2016	Fujiminosuke Yorozuya
Ad Astra per Aspera (アド アストラ ペル アスペラ, Ado Asutora peru Asupera)	#40, 2015	Present (series on hiatus)	Kenjiro Hata
Akatsuki no Bōkun (暁の暴君)	#45, 2015	#42, 2016	Iori
Hatsukoi Zombie (初恋ゾンビ)	#46, 2015	#17, 2019	Ryou Minenami
Nippen! (ニッペン!)	#49, 2015	#17, 2016	Akira Otani
Amano Megumi wa Sukidarake! (天野めぐみはスキだらけ!)	#3, 2016 (Note: Transferred from Shōnen Sunday S)	#40, 2021	Nekoguchi
Fureru to Kikoeru (ふれるときこえる)	#4/5, 2016	#45, 2016	Wakou Honna
Hiiragi-sama wa Jibun o Sagashiteiru (柊様は自分を探している。)	#10, 2016	#5/6, 2018	Hiroyuki Nishimori
Sōbōtei Kowasubeshi (双亡亭壊すべし)	#17, 2016	#34, 2021	Kazuhiro Fujita
Sandē hi Kagakukenkyūjo (サンデー非科学研究所)	#19, 2016	#45, 2017	Yūji Yokoyama
Aozakura: Bōei Daigakukō Monogatari (あおざくら 防衛大学校物語)	#22/23, 2016	Present	Hikaru Nikaidō
Sleepy Princess in the Demon Castle (魔王城でおやすみ, Maōjō de Oyasumi)	#24, 2016	Present	Kagiji Kumanomata
Komi Can't Communicate (古見さんは、コミュ症です。, Komi-san wa, Komyushō desu)	#25, 2016	#9, 2025	Tomohito Oda
Oni o Tadorite Ikuseisō (鬼ヲ辿リテ幾星霜)	#26, 2016	#15, 2017	Shinji Tonaka
Ryoko	#47, 2016	#30, 2019	Kaito Mitsuhashi
Dameterasu-sama (だめてらすさま。)	#48, 2016	#27, 2017	Shun Fujiki
Kiyo in Kyoto (舞妓さんちのまかないさん, Maiko-san chi no Makanai-san)	#5/6, 2017	8/2025	Aiko Koyama
Tenshō no Quadrable (天翔のクアドラブル)	#19, 2017	#8, 2018	Takahiro Arai
Hoankan Evans no Uso: Dead or Love (保安官エヴァンスの嘘〜DEAD OR LOVE〜)	#20, 2017	#21, 2022	Mizuki Kuriyama
Daiku no Hatō (第九の波濤)	#21, 2017	#22/23, 2023	Michiteru Kusaba
Yōkai Giga (妖怪ギガ)	#22/23, 2017	#52, 2021	Satsuki Satō
King of Idol (キング・オブ・アイドル)	#24, 2017	#44, 2018	Tamiki Wakaki
Inseki Shōjo (隕石少女)	#25, 2017	#9, 2018	Riichi Ishiyama
Shinobi no (シノビノ)	#33, 2017	#43, 2018	Rokurou Ogaki
Kanojo no Umitate Namatamago' (彼女の産みたて生卵)	#50, 2017	#52, 2017	Chihiro Kurachi
Tantei Xeno to Nanatsu no Satsujin Misshitsu (探偵ゼノと7つの殺人密室)	#1, 2018	#33, 2019	Kyoichi Nanatsuki, Teppei Sugiyama
Tokachi Hitoribocchi Nōen (十勝ひとりぼっち農園)	#1, 2018	#29, 2026	Yūji Yokoyama
Ariadne in the Blue Sky (蒼穹のアリアドネ, Sōkyū no Ariadone)	#2, 2018	#42, 2022 (Note: Transferred to Sunday Webry)	Norihiro Yagi
Marry Grave (マリーグレイブ, Marī Gureibu)	#3/4, 2018	#7, 2019	Hidenori Yamaji
Fly Me to the Moon (トニカクカワイイ, Tonikaku Kawaii)	#12, 2018	Present	Kenjiro Hata
Kimi wa 008 (君は008)	#13, 2018	#22/23, 2024	Syun Matsuena
Memesis (メメシス)	#14, 2018	#9, 2019	Takuya Yakyū
Switch	#20, 2018	#24, 2021	Atsushi Namikiri
Chrono Ma:gia:Toki no Shōkansha to Shiraha no Hanayome (クロノマギア 時の召喚者と白刃の花嫁)	#21, 2018	#29, 2018	Fujiko Dosei
5-fungo no Sekai (5分後の世界)	#22/23, 2018	#41, 2019	Hiroshi Fukuda
Detective Conan: Zero's Tea Time (名探偵コナン ゼロの日常)	#24, 2018	#26, 2022 (Note: Conclusion announced as the end of the first part)	Takahiro Arai, Gosho Aoyama (original story)
Chrono Ma:gia: Mugen no Haguruma (クロノマギア ∞の歯車)	#49, 2018	#40, 2019	Homura Kawamoto, Hikaru Muno
Imōto Rireki (妹りれき)	#2/3, 2019	#21/22, 2019 (Note: Transferred to Shōnen Sunday S)	Kei Nishimura
Fire Rabbit!!	#4/5, 2019	#12, 2020	Aya Hirakawa
Anonatsu -1959- (アノナツ-1959-)	#6, 2019	#32, 2019	Ashibi Fukui
Undine wa Kyō mo Koi o Suru ka? (水女神は今日も恋をするか？)	#7, 2019	#34, 2019	Shinya Mizu
Ponkotsu-chan Kenshōchū (ポンコツちゃん検証中)	#21/22, 2019	#34, 2021	Tsubasa Fukuchi
Mao	#23, 2019	Present	Rumiko Takahashi
Yuko Sae Tatakaeba (ゆこさえ戦えば)	#24, 2019	#11, 2020	Sei Fukui
The Tale of the Outcasts (ノケモノたちの夜, Nokemono-tachi no Yoru)	#36/37, 2019	#20, 2021	Makoto Hoshino
Call of the Night (よふかしのうた, Yofukashi no Uta)	#39, 2019	#9, 2024	Kotoyama
Detective Conan: Police Academy Arc – Wild Police Story (名探偵コナン 警察学校編 Wild Police Story, Meitantei Konan Keisatsu Gakkō-hen Wairudo Porisu Sutōrī)	#44, 2019	#51, 2020	Takahiro Arai, Gosho Aoyama (original story)

== 2020s ==
=== 2020–2024 ===
Manga	First issue	Final issue	Manga artist
Usotsuki (嘘月－ウソツキ－)	#1, 2020	#40, 2020	Minami
PingKong	#2/3, 2020	#17, 2020	Comic Jackson
Senno Shitsuji (洗脳執事)	#4/5, 2020	#21, 2020	Wakabi Asayama
Frieren: Beyond Journey's End (葬送のフリーレン, Sōsō no Frieren)	#22/23, 2020	Present	Kanehito Yamada, Tsukasa Abe
Itoyan Goto Naki (いとやんごとなき)	#24, 2020	#14, 2021	Shōta Komatsu
Ryū to Ichigo (龍と苺)	#25, 2020	#27, 2026	Mitsuharu Yanamoto
Ikeda-kun (イケ田くん)	#26, 2020	#45, 2020	Takeru Atsumi
Alice in Borderland Retry (今際の国のアリス RETRY, Imawa no Kuni no Arisu Retray)	#46, 2020	#8, 2021	Haro Aso
Bilocators (バイロケーターズ, Bairokētāzu)	#22/23, 2021	#10, 2022	Kyōsuke Tanabe
Kakeau Tsukihi (かけあうつきひ)	#24, 2021	#32, 2022	Sei Fukui
Hajime Love Comedy: Oga-Bebe (はじめラブコメ オガベベ, Hajime Rabu Kome Oga-Bebe)	#36/37, 2021	#34, 2022	Okiraku Boy
Kage to Kage (影と影) (Note: Short-term series)	#40, 2021	#42, 2021	Iya
Gifu no Prism (義父のプリズム, Gifu no Purizumu)	#43, 2021	#45, 2021	Yutaka
Guinea Pig to Hakobi-ya (ギニーピッグと運び屋)	#46, 2021	#49, 2021	Lisa Amano
Shibuya Near Family (シブヤニアファミリー, Shibuya Nia Famirī)	#48, 2021	Present	Kōji Kumeta
Shiroyama to Mita-san (白山と三田さん)	#2/3, 2022	#8, 2024	Yuhei Kusakabe
Dealing with Mikadono Sisters Is a Breeze (帝乃三姉妹は案外、チョロい。, Mikadono Sanshimai wa Angai, Choroi)	#4/5, 2022	Present	Aya Hirakawa
Typhoon Relief (タイフウリリーフ, Taifu Rirīfu)	#6, 2022	#45, 2022	Yomogi Mogi
Red Blue (レッドブルー, Reddo Burū)	#7, 2022	Present	Atsushi Namikiri
Last Karte: Hōjūi Gakusha Tōma Kenshō no Kioku (ラストカルテ―法獣医学者 当麻健匠の記憶―, Rasuto Karute Hōjūi Gakusha Tōma Kenshō no Kioku)	#8, 2022	#22/23, 2024	Wakabi Asayama
Ayakashi Meoto Roman (妖夫婦浪漫)	#15, 2022	#17, 2022	Minami
Golden Spiral	#20, 2022	#19, 2023 (Note: Transferred to Sunday Webry)	Tsubasa Fukuchi
Volley Volley (ボレーボレー, Borē Borē)	#21, 2022	#48, 2022	Kawabatao
Kono Manga no Heroine wa Morisaki Amane desu (このマンガのヒロインは守崎あまねです。, Kono Manga no Hiroin wa Morisaki Amane desu)	#22/23, 2022	#26, 2023	Nekoguchi
Romantic Comedy Quest (ラブコメクエスト, Rabu Kome Kuesuto)	#24, 2022	#46, 2022	mmk
Akatsuki Jihen (朱月事変)	#43, 2022	#42, 2023	Chigusa Ichihara
Vigness Sanshiki (ビグネス参式, Bigunesu Sanshiki)	#44, 2022	#24, 2023	Katsurō
Sōei Sōsho (双影双書)	#45, 2022	#14, 2023 (Note: Transferred to Sunday Webry)	Erika Funamoto
Kowloon jō de Mōichido (九龍城でもう一度, Kyūryū jō de Mōichido)	#46, 2022	#24, 2023	Sanshi Fujita
I Wanna Do Bad Things with You (君と悪いことがしたい, Kimi to Warui Koto ga Shitai)	#47, 2022	#18, 2024	Yutaka
Renkinjutsushi no Sumu Bukiya (錬金術師の住む武器屋)	#9, 2023	#11, 2023	Daiki Matsumine, Tamamaru
Tatari (タタリ)	#20, 2023	#25, 2025	Watari
Super String: Marco Polo's Travel to the Multiverse (スーパーストリング ―異世界見聞録―, Super String: Isekai Kenbunroku)	#21, 2023	#15, 2024	Youn In-wan, Boichi
Sternbilt no Tōrimichi (シュテルンビルトの通り路, Shuterunbiruto no Tōrimichi)	#22/23, 2023	#42, 2023	Hajime Saeki
Chīsai Boku no Haru (小さい僕の春)	#24, 2023	#40, 2023 (Note: Transferred to Sunday Webry)	Takeru Atsumi
Te no Geka (テノゲカ)	#25, 2023	#24, 2025	Shiishihi, Takahiro Arai
Shusseki Bangō 0-ban (出席番号0番)	#45, 2023	#22/23, 2024	Tomi Ota
Tsumiki Ogami's Not-So-Ordinary Life (尾守つみきと奇日常。, Ogami Tsumiki to Ki Nichijō)	#46, 2023	Present	Miyu Morishita
Mizu Polo (みずぽろ, Mizu Poro)	#50, 2023	Present	Miho Isshiki, Naoki Mizuguchi
Utsuranain desu (写らナイんです)	#18, 2024	Present	Ruka Konoshima
Rock a Rock (ロッカロック, Rokkarokku)	#19, 2024	#17, 2025	Yuzuo Batō
Hello Work Monsters (ハローワークモンスターズ, Harō Wāku Monsutāzu)	#22/23, 2024	#6, 2025	Mako Hatamachi
Albus Changes the World (廻天のアルバス, Kaiten no Arubasu)	#25, 2024	Present	Akihisa Maki, Miki Yatsubo
Kokoro Himeru no Zen Himitsu (古々路ひめるの全秘密)	#26, 2024	#11, 2025	Shōta Komatsu
Akira Failing in Love (百瀬アキラの初恋破綻中。, Momose Akira no Hatsukoi Hatan-chū)	#39, 2024	Present	Shinta Harekawa
Ichika Bachika (イチカバチカ)	#40, 2024	#50, 2025	Jinsuke Honma
Strand (ストランド, Sutorando)	#41, 2024	#45, 2025	Number 8, Ryōhei Masuko
Kai-hen Wizards (界変の魔法使い, Kaihen no Mahōtsukai)	#42, 2024	Present	Yellow Tanabe
Shite no Hana: Nōgakushi Haga Kotarō no Sakikata (シテの花 -能楽師・葉賀琥太朗の咲き方-)	#47, 2024	#51, 2025 (Note: Transferred to Sunday Webry)	Chigusa Ichihara

=== 2025–present ===
Manga	First issue	Final issue	Manga artist
Sora e… (地上へ…)	#7, 2025	#8, 2026	Syun Matsuena
Parashoppers (パラショッパーズ, Parashoppāzu)	#8, 2025	Present	Tsubasa Fukuchi
Land of Monsters (魔物の国, Mamono no Kuni)	#10, 2025	#47, 2025	Mitsutani
Silver Mountain (シルバーマウンテン, Shirubā Maunten)	#23, 2025	Present	Kazuhiro Fujita
Vampire-Idol Tagiru (ヴァンパイドル滾, Vanpa Idoru Tagiru)	#23, 2025	#20, 2026	Kazuhiko Shimamoto
Kakukamata (かくかまた)	#25, 2025	#22/23, 2026	Yuuhei Kusakabe
Kagurai: Kagura to Raito (カグライ～神楽と雷人～)	#26, 2025	#46, 2026	Lettuce Tarō, Mashu Tarō
Call of the Night: Paradise Arc (よふかしのうた-楽園編-, Yofukashi no Uta Rakuen-hen)	#31, 2025	#39, 2025	Kotoyama
Dragemis (ドラゲミス, Doragemisu)	#44, 2025	#25, 2026	Mizuki Kuriyama
Aga Kimi Chiruramu (吾が君散るらむ)	#48, 2025	#45, 2026	Shiishihi, Yuuki Tsukikoshi
Bus for Two (ふたりバス, Futari Basu)	#49, 2025	Present	Sakane Toyobayashi
Kyōseijū (共生獣) (Note: Short-term series)	#52, 2025	#2/3, 2026	Q-Sai
Hōkago, Voca-ken de! (放課後、ボカ研で！, Hōkago, Boka-ken de!)	#6, 2026	#41, 2026	Atsu Benino
Kimi wa Akeboshi (君は明け星)	#8, 2026	Present	Takenori Ichihara, Aiko Koyama
¡Paradón! (パラドン, Paradon)	#13, 2026	Present	Haruki Hajime, Kemuri Karakara
Shippo to Gekirin (しっぽと逆鱗)	#19, 2026	Present	Yutaka
Kamibiki no Monarch (神引きのモナーク, Kamibiki no Monāku)	#22/23, 2026	Present	Jirou Sugiura, Rei Okiumi
Musai no Shōkanshi (無才の召喚士)	#31, 2026	Present	UFO Nomura
Fujiwara-kun Kōkō Debut!! (不死原くん高校デビュー!!, Fujiwara-kun Kōkō Debyū!!)	#44, 2026	Present	Anji Matono
Cosmograph (コスモグラフ, Kosumogurafu)	#45, 2026	Present	Wakabi Asayama
Honey Creep	#49, 2026	Present	Mitsuharu Yanamoto
