= Rekka =

Rekka may refer to:

== Media ==
- Rekka (film), a 2016 Indian Tamil language film
- Deadly Outlaw: Rekka, a 2002 Japanese yakuza film
- Fire Emblem: The Blazing Blade, a video game known in Japan as Fire Emblem: Rekka no Ken
- Rekka, a Japanese comic by Takao Saito, see List of series run in Weekly Shōnen Sunday

== People ==
- Rekka Katakiri, a Japanese singer under the label Closed/Underground
- Lecca (singer) (born 1979), a Japanese singer under the label Cutting Edge, name pronounced as "Rekka"
