= Kaizuka =

Kaizuka may refer to:

- Kaizuka, Osaka, a city located in Osaka
- Nishitetsu Kaizuka Line, a Japanese railway line in Fukuoka prefecture
- 7475 Kaizuka, an asteroid
- A cultivar of Juniperus chinensis tree
- Hiroshi Kaizuka, manga artist; see List of series run in Weekly Shōnen Sunday
- Hiroko Kaizuka, a character in the manga series Shadow Star
