= Tadashii Kodomo no Tsukurikata! =

Japanese manga series

- First tankōbon volume cover

正しいコドモの作り方!
- Genre: Romantic comedy; Science fiction
- Manga
- Written by: Marita Morita
- Illustrated by: Takayoshi Kuroda
- Published by: Shogakukan
- Imprint: Shōnen Sunday Comics
- Magazine: Weekly Shōnen Sunday
- Original run: April 25, 2012 – September 18, 2013
- Volumes: 7
- icon

Tadashii Kodomo no Tsukurikata! (正しいコドモの作り方!; 'The Proper Way to Grow Perfect Children!') is a Japanese manga series written by Marita Morita and illustrated by Takayoshi Kuroda. It was serialized in Shogakukan's shōnen manga magazine Weekly Shōnen Sunday from April 2012 to September 2013, with its chapters collected in seven tankōbon volumes.

== Synopsis ==
Yū Tanaka is an ordinary high school boy who has feelings for his classmate and childhood friend, Kyōko Takane, but feels he is no match for her because she is cute, good at sports, and popular in their class. One day, Yū is informed by Raito, an agent sent from the future to prevent the extinction of humanity, that his genes will destroy the future human race and Kyōko is the only one who can nullify his genes. In other words, if the two are united, the extinction of humanity can be avoided. To save humanity, Yū begins to approach Kyōko while resisting temptation from other girls, but Raito is not the only agent from the future.

== Publication ==
Written by Marita Morita and illustrated by Takayoshi Kuroda, Tadashii Kodomo no Tsukurikata! was serialized in Shogakukan's shōnen manga magazine Weekly Shōnen Sunday from April 25, 2012, to September 18, 2013. Shogakukan collected its chapters in seven tankōbon volumes, released from November 16, 2012, to November 18, 2013.

=== Volumes ===
No.	Release date	ISBN
1	November 16, 2012	978-4-253-14071-3
2	February 18, 2013	978-4-09-124184-9
3	March 18, 2013	978-4-09-124251-8
4	June 18, 2013	978-4-09-124315-7
5	September 18, 2013	978-4-09-124360-7
6	October 18, 2013	978-4-09-124480-2
7	November 18, 2013	978-4-09-124491-8
