= Land of Monsters =

Japanese manga series

- First tankōbon volume cover

魔物の国 (Mamono no Kuni)
- Genre: Dark fantasy
- Manga
- Written by: Mitsutani
- Published by: Shogakukan
- English publisher: NA: Viz Media
- Imprint: Shōnen Sunday Comics
- Magazine: Weekly Shōnen Sunday
- Original run: February 5, 2025 – October 22, 2025
- Volumes: 4
- icon

Land of Monsters (Japanese: 魔物の国, Hepburn: Mamono no Kuni) is a Japanese manga series written and illustrated by Mitsutani. It was serialized in Shogakukan's shōnen manga magazine Weekly Shōnen Sunday from February to October 2025.

== Publication ==
Written and illustrated by Mitsutani, Land of Monsters was serialized in Shogakukan's Weekly Shōnen Sunday from February 5 to October 22, 2025. Shogakukan collected its chapters in four tankōbon volumes, released from May 16 to December 18, 2025.

Viz Media is publishing the series in English simultaneously with its Japanese release.

=== Volumes ===
No.	Release date	ISBN
1	May 16, 2025	978-4-09-854118-8
1. "Human Lands" (人間の土地, Ningen no Tochi); 2. "I Do Not Understand" (わかラない, Wakaranai); 3. "Perilous Mother and Child" (危うい親子, Ayaui Oyako); 4. "Farewell Ritual" (別れの儀式, Wakare no Gishiki); 5. "Gates of the Underworld" (冥府の門前, Meifu no Monzen); 6. "Nothing to Do with You" (関係ない, Kankei Nai)
2	August 18, 2025	978-4-09-854212-3
7. "A Pity, Isn't It?" (憐れだろう, Aware darō); 8. "Safe Travels" (よい旅を, Yoi Tabi o); 9. "Cheer Up!" (元気出せ！, Genki Dase!); 10. "I Want to Be Stronger" (強くなりたい, Tsuyokunaritai); 11. "The Jewelhorn Forest" (宝鹿の森, Takarajika no Mori); 12. "Divine Beast" (神獣, Shinjū); 13. "Lady Mitsukai" (みつかい様, Mitsukai-sama); 14. "Something So Imposing" (壮大な営み, Sōdai na Itonami); 15. "The Truth" (本当は, Hontō wa); 16. "Carrying It All" (全部抱えて, Zenbu Kakaete)
3	November 18, 2025	978-4-09-854331-1
17. "I Won't Let You Take Her" (渡さないから, Watasanai kara); 18. "Flute" (フルート, Furūto); 19. "What Are You Doing?" (何やってんだよ, Nani Yattenda yo); 20. "I Can't Live" (生きられません, Ikiraremasen); 21. "Long Enough" (遅いよ, Osoi yo); 22. "A Wonderful Dream" (楽しい夢, Tanoshii Yume); 23. "You're Nothing Like Her" (似てないのね, Nitenai no ne); 24. "Thank You" (ありがとう, Arigatō); 25. "Far Away" (遠くへ, Tōku e); 26. "Not at All" (全然, Zenzen)
4	December 18, 2025	978-4-09-854370-0
27. "Out of the Question" (論外だ, Rongai da); 28. "Hona" (ホナ); 29. "Inside the Belly" (腹の中, Hara no Naka); 30. "Thank Goodness" (よかった, Yokatta); 31. "I Hate It" (嫌なんだよ, Iya Nanda yo); 32. "Oki" (オキ); 33. "That's Enough" (もういいよ, Mōii yo); 34. "Run" (走れ, Hashire); 35. "Saved" (救われた, Sukuwareta); 36. "With Everyone" (みんなともっと, Minna to Motto)

== Reception ==
The first volume featured a recommendation from manga creator Rumiko Takahashi.
