= Duel Masters Rev. =

Japanese manga series

- Cover of the first volume
- Genre: Fantasy
- Manga
- Written by: Shido Kanzaki
- Illustrated by: Shinsuke Takahashi
- Published by: Shogakukan
- Imprint: Shōnen Sunday Comics
- Magazine: Weekly Shōnen Sunday
- Original run: August 29, 2012 – July 10, 2013
- Volumes: 5
- icon

Duel Masters Rev. is a Japanese manga series written by Shido Kanzaki and illustrated by Shinsuke Takahashi. It is a spin-off of the media franchise Duel Masters. It was serialized in Shogakukan's Weekly Shōnen Sunday from August 2012 to July 2013, with its chapters collected in five tankōbon volumes.

== Publication ==
Duel Masters Rev. is written by Shido Kanzaki and illustrated by Shinsuke Takahashi. It was serialized in Shogakukan's Weekly Shōnen Sunday from August 29, 2012, to July 10, 2013. It is the first Duel Masters manga to be published in a shōnen magazine, with the other manga series published in Shogakukan's children manga magazine CoroCoro Comic and its spinoffs. Shogakukan collected its chapters in five tankōbon volumes, released from December 18, 2012, to October 18, 2013.

=== Volumes ===
No.	Japanese release date	Japanese ISBN
1	December 18, 2012	978-4-09-124043-9
2	March 18, 2013	978-4-09-124194-8
3	June 18, 2013	978-4-09-124328-7
4	September 18, 2013	978-4-09-124377-5
5	October 18, 2013	978-4-09-124452-9
