= I Wanna Do Bad Things with You =

Japanese manga series

- First tankōbon volume cover

君と悪いことがしたい (Kimi to Warui Koto ga Shitai)
- Genre: Coming-of-age; Romance
- Manga
- Written by: Yutaka
- Published by: Shogakukan
- English publisher: NA: Viz Media
- Imprint: Shōnen Sunday Comics
- Magazine: Weekly Shōnen Sunday
- Original run: October 19, 2022 – March 27, 2024
- Volumes: 7
- icon

I Wanna Do Bad Things with You (Japanese: 君と悪いことがしたい, Hepburn: Kimi to Warui Koto ga Shitai) is a Japanese manga series written and illustrated by Yutaka. It was serialized in Shogakukan's shōnen manga magazine Weekly Shōnen Sunday from October 2022 to March 2024, with its chapters collected in seven tankōbon volumes.

== Plot ==
Tall and plain high school girl Mamori Wataya has always been a social outcast. One day, she meets and befriends Soushi Fuji, the most disliked boy at school. He asks her to drain the school pool for him, giving Wataya the first taste of how fun it can be to break the rules. As Fuji reminds Wataya of the villain from a TV show she had liked since childhood, she becomes his sidekick and helps him in pulling pranks on the school and those who look down on them. While they do bad things together, Wataya falls in love with Fuji.

== Publication ==
Written and illustrated by Yutaka, I Wanna Do Bad Things with You was serialized in Shogakukan's shōnen manga magazine Weekly Shōnen Sunday from October 19, 2022, to March 27, 2024. Shogakukan collected its chapters in seven tankōbon volumes, released from January 18, 2023, to May 17, 2024.

In October 2023, Viz Media announced that they licensed the series for English release in North America.

=== Volumes ===
No.	Original release date	Original ISBN	English release date	English ISBN
1	January 13, 2023	978-4-09-851530-1	August 20, 2024	978-1-9747-4708-5
2	April 18, 2023	978-4-09-852033-6	October 8, 2024	978-1-9747-4899-0
3	July 18, 2023	978-4-09-852616-1	December 10, 2024	978-1-9747-4946-1
4	October 18, 2023	978-4-09-852858-5	February 11, 2025	978-1-9747-5185-3
5	February 16, 2024	978-4-09-853116-5	April 8, 2025	978-1-9747-5240-9
6	April 17, 2024	978-4-09-853289-6	June 10, 2025	978-1-9747-5507-3
7	May 17, 2024	978-4-09-853296-4	August 12, 2025	978-1-9747-5508-0

== Reception ==
The series was nominated for the ninth Next Manga Awards in the print category.
