= Super String: Marco Polo's Travel to the Multiverse =

Japanese manga series

- First tankōbon volume cover

スーパーストリング -異世界見聞録- (Sūpā Sutoringu Isekai Kenbunroku)
- Genre: Action
- Created by: YLAB
- Manga
- Written by: Youn In-wan
- Illustrated by: Boichi
- Published by: Shogakukan
- English publisher: Webtoon (digital): NA: Yen Press
- Imprint: Shōnen Sunday Comics Special
- Magazine: Weekly Shōnen Sunday
- Original run: January 19, 2022 – March 6, 2024
- Volumes: 4
- icon

Super String: Marco Polo's Travel to the Multiverse (Note: Japanese: スーパーストリング -異世界見聞録-, Hepburn: Sūpā Sutoringu Isekai Kenbunroku; lit. 'Super String: Otherworldly Observations') is a Japanese manga series written by Youn In-wan and illustrated by Boichi. The series is tied into Korean company YLAB's SuperString IP, which features characters from various YLAB works in one universe. It was serialized in Shogakukan's shōnen manga magazine Weekly Shōnen Sunday from April 2023 to March 2024, with its chapters collected in four tankōbon volumes. It has also been simultaneously published as a webtoon on Line Manga since July of the same year.

== Publication ==
Written by Youn In-wan and illustrated by Boichi, Super String: Marco Polo's Travel to the Multiverse started in Shogakukan's shōnen manga magazine Weekly Shōnen Sunday on April 19, 2023. The series is tied into Korean company YLAB's SuperString IP, which features characters from various YLAB works in one universe. It has also been simultaneously published as a webtoon on Line Manga since July 25 of the same year. The series finished on March 6, 2024. Shogakukan collected its chapters in four tankōbon volumes, released from August 18, 2023, to April 17, 2024.

Webtoon started publishing it digitally in English on August 17, 2023. On February 7, 2025, Yen Press announced that they had licensed the series for English publication, with the first volume releasing in July.

=== Volumes ===
No.	Original release date	Original ISBN	English release date	English ISBN
1	August 18, 2023	978-4-09-852666-6	July 22, 2025	979-8-8554-1102-7
2	October 18, 2023	978-4-09-852882-0	December 16, 2025	979-8-8554-1143-0
3	January 18, 2024	978-4-09-853137-0	June 23, 2026	979-8-8554-1145-4
4	April 17, 2024	978-4-09-853216-2	December 15, 2026	979-8-8554-1147-8
