= Shinsei Motemote Ōkoku =

Japanese manga series by Ken Nagai

- Cover of volume 1 of Shinsei Motemote Ōkoku

神聖モテモテ王国
- Genre: Gag comedy
- Manga
- Written by: Ken Nagai
- Published by: Shogakukan
- Magazine: Weekly Shōnen Sunday
- Original run: March 27, 1996 – February 9, 2000
- Volumes: 6

Shinsei Motemote Ōkoku (Japanese: 神聖モテモテ王国; lit. "The Holy Motemote Kingdom") is a Japanese manga series written and illustrated by Ken Nagai. It was serialized in Shogakukan's Weekly Shōnen Sunday from March 27, 1996, to February 9, 2000. Its chapters were collected in six tankōbon volumes.

== Plot ==
The story follows a mysterious alien named Father and a boy presented as his son, Onnasky. Longing to become popular among women, they make bizarre plans every day in their apartment to pick up girls. Then they go to town, enact their stupid plans, and go home in vain. In this series, no detailed information is provided about the characters. Their conversation does not make sense sometimes, and Father's face is drawn intentionally out of proportion. These features generate uncomfortable, "off-key" feelings that result in a unique, peculiar humor, which is loved by many enthusiastic fans.

== Manga ==
Shinsei Motemote Ōkoku is written and illustrated by Ken Nagai. It started in issue #15 of Shogakukan's Weekly Shōnen Sunday on March 27, 1996, and finished in issue #9 of the magazine on February 9, 2000. The series was collected into six tankōbon volumes published by Shogakukan, released from January 18, 1997, to November 18, 1999.

=== Volume list ===
No.	Japanese release date	Japanese ISBN
1	January 18, 1997	978-4-09-125171-8
2	July 18, 1997	978-4-09-125172-5
3	February 18, 1998	978-4-09-125173-2
4	June 18, 1998	978-4-09-125174-9
5	May 18, 1999	978-4-09-125175-6
6	November 18, 1999	978-4-09-125176-3
