= Shite no Hana =

Japanese manga series

- Shite no Hana: Nōgakushi Haga Kotarō no Sakikata
- Cover of the first volume

シテの花 -能楽師・葉賀琥太朗の咲き方-
- Manga
- Written by: Chigusa Ichihara
- Published by: Shogakukan
- Imprint: Shōnen Sunday Comics
- Magazine: Weekly Shōnen Sunday; (October 16, 2024 – November 19, 2025); Sunday Webry; (December 6, 2025 – July 25, 2026)
- Original run: October 16, 2024 – July 25, 2026
- Volumes: 7
- icon

Shite no Hana: Nōgakushi Haga Kotarō no Sakikata (シテの花 -能楽師・葉賀琥太朗の咲き方-) is a Japanese manga series written and illustrated by Chigusa Ichihara with supervision by Kazufusa Hosho. It was serialized in Shogakukan's shōnen manga magazine Weekly Shōnen Sunday from October 2024 to November 2025; its serialization resumed on the manga website Sunday Webry in December 2025, where it ended in July 2016. The manga's individual chapters were collected into seven volumes.

== Plot ==
Kotaro Haga is a member of a popular dance group, but sometimes feels dissatisfied with it. Later, during a performance, Kotaro gets into an accident which leaves a scar on his face. Kotaro subsequently decides to retire from the entertainment industry. However, his late grandmother left him a ticket to a noh performance. After enjoying the show, he decides to become a noh performer.

== Production ==
Prior to Shite no Hana, Ichihara had received praise for works depicting people dedicated to their job, like craftsmen. They also preferred drawing traditional Japanese clothing over Western clothing. They considered kabuki, competitive karuta, go, and shogi as possible themes, but ultimately settled on noh because they felt it would be the best fit for the story they wanted to write.

For research, Ichihara interviewed several noh performers, toured performance venues, and sampled a large amount of different masks and costumes. To appeal to young boys, the target demographic of Weekly Shōnen Sunday, Ichihara added common elements from shōnen manga, while also keeping the focus on noh.

== Publication ==
Written and illustrated by Chigusa Ichihara, with supervision by noh performer Kazufusa Hosho, the series began serialization in Shogakukan's shōnen manga magazine Weekly Shōnen Sunday on October 16, 2024. The series finished its serialization in Weekly Shōnen Sunday on November 19, 2025. The series resumed its serialization on the manga website Sunday Webry where it ran from December 6, 2025 to July 25, 2026. The series' individual chapters were collected into seven tankōbon volumes released from March 18, 2025, to August 18, 2026.

=== Volumes ===
No.	Japanese release date	Japanese ISBN
1	March 18, 2025	978-4-09-854028-0
2	May 16, 2025	978-4-09-854119-5
3	August 18, 2025	978-4-09-854213-0
4	November 18, 2025	978-4-09-854332-8
5	March 18, 2026	978-4-09-854541-4
6	August 18, 2026	978-4-09-854713-5
7	August 18, 2026	978-4-09-854714-2

== Reception ==
The series was nominated for the Next Manga Award in 2025 and 2026. Yuki Suenaga, the writer of Akane-banashi, recommended the manga.

Kō Aokage of Real Sound felt the depiction of noh was realistic and emotional. He also liked the protagonist, praising his character development as the story progresses.
