= Itoyan Goto Naki =

Japanese manga series

- First tankōbon volume cover

いとやんごとなき
- Genre: Comedy
- Manga
- Written by: Shōta Komatsu
- Published by: Shogakukan
- Imprint: Shōnen Sunday Comics
- Magazine: Weekly Shōnen Sunday
- Original run: May 13, 2020 – March 3, 2021
- Volumes: 4

Itoyan Goto Naki (いとやんごとなき) is a Japanese manga series written and illustrated by Shōta Komatsu. It was serialized in Shogakukan's shōnen manga magazine Weekly Shōnen Sunday from May 2020 to March 2021, with its chapters collected in four tankōbon volumes.

== Publication ==
Itoyan Goto Naki, written and illustrated by Shōta Komatsu, was his debut serialized work. It was serialized in Shogakukan's shōnen manga magazine Weekly Shōnen Sunday from May 13, 2020, to March 3, 2021. Shogakukan collected its chapters in four tankōbon volumes, released from September 18, 2020, to May 18, 2021.

=== Volumes ===
No.	Japanese release date	Japanese ISBN
1	September 18, 2020	978-4-09-850182-3
2	November 18, 2020	978-4-09-850275-2
3	February 18, 2021	978-4-09-850393-3
4	May 18, 2021	978-4-09-850526-5
