= Tatari (manga) =

Japanese manga series

- First tankōbon volume cover

タタリ
- Manga
- Written by: Watari
- Published by: Shogakukan
- Imprint: Shōnen Sunday Comics
- Magazine: Weekly Shōnen Sunday
- Original run: April 5, 2023 – May 21, 2025
- Volumes: 9
- icon

Tatari (タタリ) is a Japanese manga series written and illustrated by Watari. It was serialized in Shogakukan's shōnen manga magazine Weekly Shōnen Sunday from April 2023 to May 2025.

== Publication ==
Written and illustrated by Watari, Tatari was serialized in Shogakukan's shōnen manga magazine Weekly Shōnen Sunday from April 5, 2023, to May 21, 2025. Shogakukan collected its chapters in nine individual tankōbon volumes, released from August 18, 2023, to July 17, 2025.

=== Volumes ===
No.	Release date	ISBN
1	August 18, 2023	978-4-09-852783-0
2	November 17, 2023	978-4-09-853018-2
3	February 16, 2024	978-4-09-853114-1
4	May 17, 2024	978-4-09-853297-1
5	August 17, 2024	978-4-09-853547-7
6	November 18, 2024	978-4-09-853681-8
7	February 18, 2025	978-4-09-854011-2
8	May 16, 2025	978-4-09-854113-3
9	July 17, 2025	978-4-09-854172-0

== Reception ==
The manga was nominated for the tenth Next Manga Award in the print category in 2024.
