= Last Karte =

Japanese manga series by Wakabi Asayama

- Last Karte: Hōjūi Gakusha Tōma Kenshō no Kioku
- First tankōbon volume cover

ラストカルテ―法獣医学者 当麻健匠の記憶― (Rasuto Karute Hōjūi Gakusha Tōma Kenshō no Kioku)
- Genre: Medical; Mystery
- Manga
- Written by: Wakabi Asayama
- Published by: Shogakukan
- Imprint: Shōnen Sunday Comics
- Magazine: Weekly Shōnen Sunday
- Original run: January 19, 2022 – April 24, 2024
- Volumes: 10
- icon

Last Karte: Hōjūi Gakusha Tōma Kenshō no Kioku (Japanese: ラストカルテ―法獣医学者 当麻健匠の記憶―, Hepburn: Rasuto Karute Hōjūi Gakusha Tōma Kenshō no Kioku) is a Japanese manga series written and illustrated by Wakabi Asayama. It was serialized in Shogakukan's shōnen manga magazine Weekly Shōnen Sunday from January 2022 to April 2024, with its chapters collected in ten tankōbon volumes.

== Publication ==
Written and illustrated by Wakabi Asayama, Last Karte: Hōjūi Gakusha Tōma Kenshō no Kioku' was serialized in Shogakukan's shōnen manga magazine Weekly Shōnen Sunday from January 19, 2022, to April 24, 2024. Shogakukan collected its chapters in ten tankōbon volumes, released from March 17, 2022, to June 18, 2024.

=== Volumes ===
No.	Japanese release date	Japanese ISBN
1	March 17, 2022	978-4-09-851039-9
2	July 15, 2022	978-4-09-851188-4
3	October 18, 2022	978-4-09-851351-2
4	February 16, 2023	978-4-09-851605-6
5	June 16, 2023	978-4-09-852127-2
6	November 17, 2023	978-4-09-853016-8
7	December 18, 2023	978-4-09-853031-1
8	March 18, 2024	978-4-09-853181-3
9	May 17, 2024	978-4-09-853295-7
10	June 18, 2024	978-4-09-853379-4

== Reception ==
The series ranked nineteenth in the 2023 Next Manga Award in the print manga category. It ranked 25th the 2023 "Book of the Year" list by Da Vinci magazine.
