= Tsumiki Ogami's Not-So-Ordinary Life =

Japanese manga series

- First tankōbon volume cover

尾守つみきと奇日常。 (Ogami Tsumiki to Ki Nichijō)
- Genre: Comedy; Supernatural
- Manga
- Written by: Miyu Morishita
- Published by: Shogakukan
- English publisher: NA: Viz Media
- Imprint: Shōnen Sunday Comics
- Magazine: Weekly Shōnen Sunday
- Original run: October 11, 2023 – present
- Volumes: 11
- icon

Tsumiki Ogami's Not-So-Ordinary Life (Japanese: 尾守つみきと奇日常。, Hepburn: Ogami Tsumiki to Ki Nichijō) is a Japanese manga series written and illustrated by Miyu Morishita. It has been serialized in Shogakukan's shōnen manga magazine Weekly Shōnen Sunday since October 2023.

== Plot ==
Yutaka Shinso is a first-year high school student studying at Keiki Private High School. In a world where humans and non-humans now live side-by-side, he meets Tsumiki Ogami, a werewolf who treats him kindly, in contrast to the cold reception he received back in junior high school. As the two spend time together and he becomes more attached to Tsumiki, he finds meaning in his once-boring life.

== Characters ==
Yutaka Shinso (真層 友孝, Shinsō Yutaka)
A first-year high school student who befriends Tsukimi. When he was in junior high school, he was unable to make friends and did not have much of a direction in life. He decided to enroll in Keiki Private High School despite being far from his home in order to start afresh.
Tsumiki Ogami (尾守 つみき, Ogami Tsumiki)
Yutaka's classmate and one of the popular students in their class. She is a werewolf and has visible canine features, including a tail and dog-like feet. Despite being a non-human, she has a kind personality, quickly befriending Yutaka.

== Publication ==
Written and illustrated by Miyu Morishita, Tsumiki Ogami's Not-So-Ordinary Life started in Shogakukan's shōnen manga magazine Weekly Shōnen Sunday on October 11, 2023. Shogakukan released the first tankōbon volume on March 18, 2024. As of September 16, 2026, eleven volumes have been released.

In October 2024, Viz Media announced that it has licensed the manga for English release in North America, with the first volume set to be released on July 8, 2025. On January 28, 2025, Viz Media announced that it would publish the series in English simultaneously with its Japanese release.

=== Volumes ===
No.	Original release date	Original ISBN	English release date	English ISBN
1	March 18, 2024	978-4-09-853182-0	July 8, 2025	978-1-9747-5602-5
1. "Tsumiki Is a Werewolf" (つみきさんはウェアウルフ。, Tsumiki-san wa Weaurufu); 2. "Tsumiki's Den" (つみきさんの住み処。, Tsumiki-san no Sumika); 3. "Lunch with Tsumiki" (つみきさんとお昼。, Tsumiki-san to Ohiru); 4. "Field Trip with Tsumiki" (つみきさんと遠足。, Tsumiki-san to Ensoku); 5. "Tsumiki and Senga" (つみきさんと千賀くん。, Tsumiki-san to Senga-kun); 6. "Tsumiki Plays Ball" (つみきさん、野球する。, Tsumiki-san, Yakyū-suru); 7. "Tsumiki Runs" (つみきさん、走る。, Tsumiki-san, Hashiru)
2	June 18, 2024	978-4-09-853381-7	September 9, 2025	978-1-9747-5913-2
8. "Tsumiki's Baking" (つみきクッキング。, Tsumiki Kukkingu); 9. "Tsumiki and the Missing Glasses" (つみきさんと探しもの。, Tsumiki-san to Sagashimono); 10. "Tsumiki and Hebizono" (つみきさんと蛇園さん。, Tsumiki-san to Hebizono-san); 11. "Tsumiki Pays a Visit" (つみきさん、訪問。, Tsumiki-san, Hōmon); 12. "Tsumiki and the Sports Festival" (つみきさんと体育祭。, Tsumiki-san to Taiikusai); 13. "Tsumiki and the Ball Toss" (つみきさんと玉入れ。, Tsumiki-san to Tamaire); 14. "Yutaka and Senga" (友孝くんと千賀くん。, Yutaka-kun to Senga-kun); 15. "Yutaka Gets Taken" (友孝くん、もらう。, Yutaka-kun, Morau); 16. "Yutaka Runs" (友孝くん、走る。, Yutaka-kun, Hashiru)
3	September 18, 2024	978-4-09-853575-0	November 11, 2025	978-1-9747-5914-9
17. "Studying with Tsumiki" (つみきさんと勉強。, Tsumiki-san to Benkyō); 18. "Tsumiki and the Hairbrush" (つみきさんとブラシ。, Tsumiki-san to Burashi); 19. "Tsumiki and Umami" (つみきさんと馬美さん。, Tsumiki-san to Umami-san); 20. "Tsumiki and the Big Cleanup" (つみきさんと大掃除。, Tsumiki-san to Ōsōji); 21. "Tsumiki and Kinami" (つみきさんと揮波さん。, Tsumiki-san to Kinami-san); 22. "Tsumiki and Itsuki" (つみきさんといつきさん。, Tsumiki-san to Itsuki-san); 23. "Sugimi Meets Disaster" (杉見さん、遭難。, Sugimi-san, Sōnan); 24. "Tsumiki and the Summer Festival" (つみきさんと夏、祭り。, Tsumiki-san to Natsu, Matsuri); 25. "Tsumiki, Summer, and Fireworks" (つみきさんと夏、花火。, Tsumiki-san to Natsu, Hanabi)
4	December 18, 2024	978-4-09-853807-2	January 13, 2026	978-1-9747-6146-3
26. "Break Time with Tsumiki" (つみきさんと休憩。, Tsumiki-san to Kyūkei); 27. "Hebizono and the Mirror" (蛇園さんと鏡。, Hebizono-san to Kagami); 28. "Interviewing Mokuri" (最繰さん、取材。, Mokuri-san, Shuzai); 29. "Preparing with Tsumiki" (つみきさんと準備。, Tsumiki-san to Junbi); 30. "Tsumiki and Mokuri" (つみきさんと最繰さん。, Tsumiki-san to Mokuri-san); 31. "Mokuri and Silk" (最繰さんと糸。, Mokuri-san to Ito); 32. "Yutaka and Mokuri" (友孝くんと最繰さん。, Yutaka-kun to Mokuri-san); 33. "Tsumiki and the Cultural Festival" (つみきさんと文化祭。, Tsumiki-san to Bunkasai); 34. "Tsumiki Sings" (つみきさん、歌う。, Tsumiki-san, Utau)
5	March 18, 2025	978-4-09-854023-5	March 10, 2026	978-1-9747-6147-0
35. "Club Activities with Tsumiki" (つみきさんと活動体験。, Tsumiki-san to Katsudō Taiken); 36. "Tsumiki and Yumenaka" (つみきさんと夢中先輩。, Tsumiki-san to Yumenaka-senpai); 37. "Yumenaka and Horoscopes" (夢中先輩と占い。, Yumenaka-senpai to Uranai); 38. "First Job with Tsumiki" (つみきさんと初仕事。, Tsumiki-san to Hatsu Shigoto); 39. "Chasing After Yutaka" (追跡！友孝くん。, Tsuiseki! Yutaka-kun); 40. "Mokuri and Sugimi" (最繰さんと杉見さん。, Mokuri-san to Sugimi-san); 41. "Special Training with Tsumiki" (つみきさんと特訓。, Tsumiki-san to Tokkun); 42. "Outdoor Activities with Tsumiki" (つみきさんと野外活動。, Tsumiki-san to Yagai Katsudō); 43. "Tsumiki and Sunshine" (つみきさんと晴れ。, Tsumiki-san to Hare)
6	June 18, 2025	978-4-09-854155-3	May 12, 2026	978-1-9747-6304-7
44. "Tsumiki and Electricity" (つみきさんと電気。, Tsumiki-san to Denki); 45. "President Raizen and Halloween" (雷漸会長とハロウィン。, Raizen Kaichō to Harowin); 46. "Serve-Receive Drills with Tsumiki" (つみきさんとレシーブ練習。, Tsumiki-san to Reshību Renshū); 47. "Sports Day with Tsumiki" (つみきさんと球技大会。, Tsumiki-san to Kyūgi Taikai); 48. "Kito and the Portrait" (気筒くんと似顔絵。, Kitō-kun to Nigaoe); 49. "Christmas with Tsumiki" (つみきさんとクリスマス。, Tsumiki-san to Kurisumasu); 50. "Working Through the New Year with Tsumiki" (つみきさんとお正月バイト。, Tsumiki-san to Oshōgatsu Baito); 51. "Tsumiki's Return" (つみきさん、再来。, Tsumiki-san, Sairai); 52. "Yutaka and the Third Semester" (友孝くんと三学期。, Yutaka-kun to San Gakki)
7	September 18, 2025	978-4-09-854241-3	August 11, 2026	978-1-9747-6604-8
53. "Senga's Friends" (千賀くんの友達。, Senga-kun no Tomodachi); 54. "Hebizono's Valentine" (蛇園さんのバレンタイン。, Hebizono-san no Barentain); 55. "Tsumiki and Valentine's Day" (つみきさんとバレンタイン。, Tsumiki-san to Barentain); 56. "President Raizen and the Microwave" (雷漸会長とレンジ。, Raizen Kaichō to Renji); 57. "Party With Everyone" (つみきさん達とパーティー。, Tsumiki-san-tachi to Pātī); 58. "President Raizen and Lightning" (雷漸会長と雷。, Raizen Kaichō to Kaminari); 59. "President Raizen and the Promise" (雷漸会長と約束。, Raizen Kaichō to Yakusoku); 60. "Cops and Robbers with Tsumiki" (つみきさんとケイドロ。, Tsumiki-san to Keidoro); 61. "Tsumiki and Snow" (つみきさんと雪。, Tsumiki-san to Yuki)
8	December 18, 2025	978-4-09-854374-8	December 8, 2026	978-1-9747-6915-5
62. "Yutaka and White Day" (友孝くんとホワイトデー。, Yutaka-kun to Howaito Dē); 63. "Yumenaka's Fever" (発熱！夢中先輩。, Hatsunetsu! Yumenaka-senpai); 64. "Tsumiki and Chinatown" (つみきさんと中華街。, Tsumiki-san to Chūkagai); 65. "Tsumiki's Type" (つみきさんのタイプ。, Tsumiki-san no Taipu); 66. "Tsumiki and "Just Us"" (つみきさんと二人でも。, Tsumiki-san to Futari demo); 67. "Hebizono and Kito" (蛇園さんと気筒くん。, Hebizono-san to Kitō-kun); 68. "Tsumiki's Closet Conundrum" (つみきさん、ファッション思案。, Tsumiki-san, Fasshon Shian); 69. "Tsumiki and the Zoo" (つみきさんと動物園。, Tsumiki-san to Dōbutsuen); 70. "Tsumiki's Class Tour" (つみきさんとクラス案内。, Tsumiki-san to Kurasu Annai)
9	March 18, 2026	978-4-09-854489-9	—	—
71. "Yutaka's Class Committee Assignment" (友孝くんのクラス委員決め。, Yutaka-kun no Kurasu Iingime); 72. "Kojo Starts High School" (新入生！虎条ちゃん。, Shinnyūsei! Kojō-chan); 73. "The Heart-Pounding Three-Legged Race Experiment" (検証！ドキドキ二人三脚。, Kenshō! Dokidoki Ninin Sankyaku); 74. "Tsumiki and Nose Touches" (つみきさんと鼻タッチ。, Tsumiki-san to Hana Tatchi); 75. "Interviewing Yutaka" (友孝くん、インタビュー。, Yutaka-kun, Intabyū); 76. "Kojo's Mission" (虎条ちゃんのミッション。, Kojō-chan no Misshon); 77. "Ako Yumenaka's Love" (夢中杏恋の恋。, Yumenaka Ako no Koi); 78. "Yutaka Pays A Visit" (尾守家、訪問。, Ogami-ke, Hōmon); 79. "Sleepover at the Ogamis'" (尾守家、一泊。, Ogami-ke, Ippaku)
10	June 18, 2026	978-4-09-854653-4	—	—
11	September 16, 2026	978-4-09-854816-3	—	—

=== Chapters not yet in tankōbon format ===
80. "Dance Practice with Captain Yumenaka" (夢中団長、ダンス練習。, Yumenaka Danchō, Dansu Renshū)
81. "Hachie and Kurohane" (八重さんと黒羽さん。, Hachie-san to Kurohane-san)
82. "Painting Flags with Kito" (気筒さんと旗作り。, Kitō-san to Hatazukuri)
83. "Sports Festival Prep with Tsumiki" (つみきさんと体育祭準備。, Tsumiki-san to Taiikusai Junbi)
84. "Tsumiki's White-Hot Cavalry Battle" (白熱、つみき騎馬隊。, Hakunetsu, Tsumiki Kibatai)
85. "Kojo's Three-Legged Race" (虎条さんの二人三脚。, Kojō-san no Ninin Sankyaku)
86. "Kojo's Father Joins the Fight" (虎条さんパパ、参戦。, Kojō-san Papa, Sansen)
87. "Kojo Goes Missing" (虎条さん、捜索中。, Kojō-san, Sōsaku-chū)
88. "Cheer Battle With Kojo" (虎条さんと応援合戦。, Kojō-san to Ōengassen)
89. "Tsumiki and the Nurse's Office" (つみきさんと保健室。, Tsumiki-san to Hokenshitsu)
90. "Studying for Midterms with Senga" (千賀くんとテスト勉強。, Senga-kun to Tesuto Benkyō)
91. "Tsumiki Makes a Lunch Box" (つみきさんのお弁当作り。, Tsumiki-san no Obentōzukuri)
92. "Kito's Face" (気筒さんの表情。, Kitō-san no Hyōjō)
93. "The Way Home with Hebizono" (蛇園ちゃんと帰り道。, Hebizono-chan to Kaerimichi)
94. "Tsumiki's Lost Hairbrush" (つみきさんとクシ探し。, Tsumiki-san to Kushi Sagashi)
95. "Yutaka and Music" (友孝くんと音楽。, Yutaka-kun to Ongaku)
96. "Working Out With Kojo" (虎条ちゃんとジム。, Kojō-chan to Jimu)
97. "First Date With Kito" (気筒さんと初デート。, Kitō-san to Hatsu Dēto)
98. "Shopping for Tsumiki's Swimsuit" (つみきさんの水着選び。, Tsumiki-san no Mizugi Erabi)
99. "Kojo's Summer Plans" (虎条さんの夏休み計画。, Kojō-san no Natsuyasumi Keikaku)
100. "Tsumiki, Everyone, and the Beach" (つみきさんたちと海。, Tsumiki-san-tachi to Umi)
101. "Yutaka and the Beach" (友孝くんと海。, Yutaka-kun to Umi)
102. "Senga and President Raizen" (千賀くんと雷漸会長。, Senga-kun to Raizen Kaichō)
103. "Swimming Lessons with Tsumiki" (つみきさんと泳ぎレッスン。, Tsumiki-san to Oyogi Ressun)

== Reception ==
The series ranked third in the print category at the 10th Next Manga Awards in 2024. The series was also ranked eleventh in the Nationwide Bookstore Employees' Recommended Comics list of 2025.
