= Utsuranain desu =

Japanese manga series

- First tankōbon volume cover, featuring Makoto Kurokiri (left) and Michiru Tachibana (right)

写らナイんです
- Genre: Comedy horror; Occult
- Manga
- Written by: Ruka Konoshima
- Published by: Shogakukan
- Imprint: Shōnen Sunday Comics
- Magazine: Weekly Shōnen Sunday
- Original run: March 27, 2024 – present
- Volumes: 10
- icon

Utsuranain desu (写らナイんです; lit. 'It Doesn't Show Up') is a Japanese manga series written and illustrated by Ruka Konoshima. It has been serialized in Shogakukan's shōnen manga magazine Weekly Shōnen Sunday since March 2024.

== Plot ==
First-year student Michiru Tachibana (橘 みちる, Tachibana Michiru) has been fascinated by paranormal phenomena and the occult since childhood. However, despite her enthusiasm, she possesses no spiritual sensitivity and instead has an involuntary exorcism ability, which causes her to inadvertently dispel nearby spirits whenever she attempts to capture them in photographs. When Makoto Kurokiri (黒桐 まこと, Kurokiri Makoto), a mysterious and withdrawn transfer student, joins Michiru's class, she hears disturbing rumors about him and invites him to join the Occult Club. He initially refuses, but it is later revealed that Makoto suffers from an extreme spirit-attracting constitution, causing him to unconsciously draw in malevolent supernatural entities since childhood. This ability has led to his isolation and loneliness. After Michiru unknowingly exorcises a dog spirit haunting Makoto, as well as several other surrounding apparitions, Makoto begins to see her as someone who can free him from his torment. Wanting to befriend her, he decides to join the Occult Club, setting the stage for their further supernatural investigations.

== Publication ==
Written and illustrated by Ruka Konoshima, Utsuranain desu started in Shogakukan's shōnen manga magazine Weekly Shōnen Sunday on March 27, 2024. Shogakukan has collected its chapters into individual tankōbon volumes, with the first one released on August 17, 2024. As of November 18, 2026, ten volumes have been released.

=== Volumes ===
No.	Japanese release date	Japanese ISBN
1	August 17, 2024	978-4-09-853543-9
2	November 18, 2024	978-4-09-853682-5
3	February 18, 2025	978-4-09-854012-9
4	May 16, 2025	978-4-09-854114-0
5	August 18, 2025	978-4-09-854209-3
6	October 17, 2025	978-4-09-854272-7
7	January 16, 2026	978-4-09-854325-0
8	May 18, 2026	978-4-09-854580-3
9	August 18, 2026	978-4-09-854743-2
10	November 18, 2026	978-4-09-855006-7

== Reception ==
The series ranked 35th on Takarajimasha's Kono Manga ga Sugoi! list of best manga of 2025 for male readers. It ranked fourth in the 11th Next Manga Awards in 2025 in the print category. It ranked fourth in AnimeJapan's "Manga We Want to See Animated" poll in 2026. It was nominated for the 50th Kodansha Manga Award in the shōnen category in 2026.

The series has been recommended by manga artists including Junji Ito, Yama Wayama, Yusuke Murata, and One, as well as illustrator Nagano.
