= Bus for Two =

Japanese manga series

- First tankōbon volume cover

ふたりバス (Futari Basu)
- Genre: Romantic comedy
- Manga
- Written by: Sakane Toyobayashi
- Published by: Shogakukan
- English publisher: NA: Viz Media
- Imprint: Shōnen Sunday Comics
- Magazine: Weekly Shōnen Sunday
- Original run: November 5, 2025 – present
- Volumes: 4

Bus for Two (Japanese: ふたりバス, Hepburn: Futari Basu) is a Japanese manga series written and illustrated by Sakane Toyobayashi. It began serialization in Shogakukan's Weekly Shōnen Sunday magazine in November 2025, and has been compiled into four volumes as of November 2026.

== Plot ==
Shunpei Hinoki is a junior high school student from Azeno, a small town of around 3,000 people. He and his elementary classmate An Takayagawa had known each other since pre-school but were now going to different schools, with their only recent interactions being taking the same bus to school. One day, the two discover that a vending machine that their bus regularly passed by had disappeared, leading to the two speaking to the each other for the first time in a long time. With the two now reconnected, the two begin to re-establish their relationship and make up for lost time.

== Characters ==
Shunpei Hinoki (桧木 春平, Hinoki Shunpei)
A junior high school student who commutes on the same bus as An every day. The two were classmates in pre-school and elementary, but drifted apart after they went to different junior high schools. He initially finds their re-encounter awkward, but later reconnects with An. As time goes on, he realizes that he has feelings for An.
An Takayagawa (高屋川 あん, Takayagawa An)
A junior high school who studies at a private academy. She was known for her intelligence in elementary and was a close friend to Shunpei, but lately the two were not close. After their reunion, she becomes more friendly towards Shunpei, with the two even studying together during summer break.
Luluca Muta (牟田 ルルカ, Muta Ruruka)
Shunpei's classmate, who was close friends with An in elementary. Despite the two now going to different schools, the two remain friends.

== Publication ==
The series is written and illustrated by Sakane Toyobayashi, who had previously published the oneshot Ponytail ni Yureru in Shogakukan's Weekly Shōnen Sunday in 2023. The series is serialized in Weekly Shōnen Sunday, with the first three chapters being released on November 5, 2025. The first volume was released on February 18, 2026. Four volumes have been released as of November 18, 2026.

In October 2026, Viz Media announced that it had licensed the series for English publication and will release the first volume in Q3 2027.

No.	Original release date	Original ISBN	English release date	English ISBN
1	February 18, 2026	978-4-09-854455-4	July 13, 2027	978-1-97-477520-0
1. Haru no Michi (はるのみち); 2. Asa Nebō (あさねぼう); 3. Tonari Basu (となりバス); 4. Tama Musobi (たまむすび); 5. Hana ga Saku (はながさく); 6. Kami Oroshi (かみおろし); 7. Muta Ruruka (むたるるか); 8. Sukina Hito (すきなひと); 9. Nichiyōbi (にちようび); 10. Tokubetsu na (とくべつな); 11. Somaru Iro (そまるいろ)
2	May 18, 2026	978-4-09-854588-9	—	—
12. Dai Ippo (だいいっぽ); 13. Matsuno-san (まつのさん); 14. Takaku Tobu (たかくとぶ); 15. Honki Dasu (ほんきだす); 16. Ganbatte (がんばって); 17. Issho ni (いっしょに); 18. Mokumokuto (もくもくと); 19. Sukina Koto (すきなこと); 20. Tsuyu no Asa (つゆのあさ); 21. Tōi Umi (とおいうみ); 22. Michi no Saki (みちのさき)
3	August 18, 2026	978-4-09-854745-6	—	—
23. Natsugoromo (なつごろも); 24. Zattsurai (ザッツライ); 25. Ano Futari (あのふたり); 26. Natsu no Kage (なつのかげ); 27. Natsu Yasumi (なつやすみ); 28. Hitori Basu (ひとりバス); 29. Hatsu Denwa (はつでんわ); 30. Mizu Shibuki (みずしぶき); 31. In Kamera (インカメラ); 32. Datta Nara (だったなら); 33. Natsu Matsuri (なつますり)
4	November 18, 2026	978-4-09-855008-1	—	—
34. Tsukano Mano (つかのまの); 35. Daiarī (ダイアリー); 36. Omedetō (おめでとう); 37. Mata Pasu de (またパスで); 38. Nobi Zakari (のびざかり); 39. Fureta Dake (ふれただけ); 40. Ikkō e (いつこうえ); 41. Arashi no Hi (あらしのひ); 42. Are mo yō (あれもよう); 43. Fure fure to (ふれふれと); 44. Nabiku Kami (なびくかみ)

=== Chapters not yet in tankōbon format ===
These chapters have yet to be published in a tankōbon volume.

45. Sukoshi Mae (すこしまえ)
46. Tomo no Koi (とものこい)
47. Yuri Yurare (ゆりゆられ)
48. Osuse Wake (おすそわけ)
49. Fuzoroi na (ふぞろいな)
50. Fui ni Kiku (ふいにきく)
51. Kanchigai (かんちがい)
52. Tsumannai (つまんない)

== Reception ==
The series was ranked sixth in the fifth Crea Late Manga Awards in 2026. The series was ranked second in the print category at the 12th Next Manga Awards in 2026.
