= Shibuya Near Family =

Japanese manga series by Kōji Kumeta

- First tankōbon volume cover

シブヤニアファミリー (Shibuya Nia Famirī)
- Genre: Comedy; Slice of life
- Manga
- Written by: Kōji Kumeta
- Published by: Shogakukan
- Imprint: Shōnen Sunday Comics Special
- Magazine: Weekly Shōnen Sunday
- Original run: October 27, 2021 – present
- Volumes: 7
- icon

Shibuya Near Family (Japanese: シブヤニアファミリー, Hepburn: Shibuya Nia Famirī) is a Japanese manga series written and illustrated by Kōji Kumeta. It has been serialized in Shogakukan's shōnen manga magazine Weekly Shōnen Sunday since October 2021.

== Publication ==
Written and illustrated by Kōji Kumeta, Shibuya Near Family started in Shogakukan's shōnen manga magazine Weekly Shōnen Sunday on October 27, 2021. In March 2026, Kumeta announced that the manga would go on hiatus due to a finger injury, and that one-shot stories would be published in the magazine instead until he recovers. Shogakukan has collected its chapters into individual tankōbon volumes. The first volume was released on September 15, 2022. As of July 16, 2026, seven volumes have been released.

=== Volumes ===
No.	Release date	ISBN
1	September 15, 2022	978-4-09-851296-6
2	May 18, 2023	978-4-09-852044-2
3	March 18, 2024	978-4-09-853138-7
4	December 18, 2024	978-4-09-853780-8
5	August 18, 2025	978-4-09-854217-8
6	December 18, 2025	978-4-09-854384-7
7	July 16, 2026	978-4-09-854695-4
