= Albus Changes the World =

Japanese manga series

- Cover of the first volume

廻天のアルバス (Kaiten no Arubasu)
- Genre: Adventure; Fantasy
- Manga
- Written by: Akihisa Maki
- Illustrated by: Miki Yatsubo
- Published by: Shogakukan
- English publisher: NA: Viz Media
- Imprint: Shōnen Sunday Comics
- Magazine: Weekly Shōnen Sunday
- Original run: May 15, 2024 – present
- Volumes: 9
- icon

Albus Changes the World (Japanese: 廻天のアルバス, Hepburn: Kaiten no Arubasu) is a Japanese manga series written by Akihisa Maki and illustrated by Miki Yatsubo. It has been serialized in Shogakukan's shōnen manga magazine Weekly Shōnen Sunday since May 2024. As of October 2026, the manga's individual chapters have been collected into nine volumes.

== Plot ==
In the Kingdom of Ardelia, a ceremony to commemorate the hero is being held, but the hero Albus skips it and instead picks up a priestess named Fiona in front of the castle gates and the two begin their journey together. Albus tells Fiona that he has a power that allows time to rewind to the day he departed as a hero when he dies.

Three years and six months later, having made the necessary preparations to defeat the demon lord, the two enter the demon lord's castle and are successful in defeating him. Shortly afterwards, Fiona awakens as the next demon lord, and Albus is fatally wounded. Before dying, Albus defeats Fiona and uses the ultimate dimensional magic to rewind time.

The demon lord uses a human body as a vessel and, even if defeated, can revive by taking over the body of another human. In order to prevent Fiona from becoming the demon lord, Albus begins a new journey to defeat the demon lord as fast as possible.

== Production ==
When Akihisa Maki first started writing manga, Maki wanted their work to be serialized in Weekly Shōnen Sunday, but Maki struggled with drawing illustrations quickly. Eventually, Maki's editor showed Maki's storyboards to Miki Yatsubo. The two later decided to team up.

Maki initially wanted to create a light-hearted comedy manga. At the time, Maki was also watching a lot of RTA videos, which led to them wanting to draw a manga where the protagonist keeps repeating events to get the fastest time. Maki did not decide the protagonist's objective until they were writing the second and third chapters. In creating the illustrations, Yatsubo wanted to make the character designs unique and the backgrounds detailed, while also making sure they did not hinder the flow of the story.

== Publication ==
Written by Akihisa Maki and illustrated by Miki Yatsubo, the series began serialization in Shogakukan's shōnen manga magazine Weekly Shōnen Sunday on May 15, 2024. As of October 2026, the series' individual chapters have been collected into nine tankōbon volumes.

In February 2026, Viz Media announced that they licensed the series for English publication. In the following April, Viz Media announced that it would publish the series in English simultaneously with its Japanese release.

=== Volumes ===
No.	Original release date	Original ISBN	English release date	English ISBN
1	September 18, 2024	978-4-09-853577-4	November 10, 2026	978-1-9747-6943-8
1. "Albus the Hero" (勇者アルバス, Yūsha Arubasu); 2. "Requests" (依頼, Irai); 3. "The Reason" (理由, Riyū); 4. "Warp" (ワープ, Wāpu); 5. "Equipment and Levels" (装備とレベル, Sōbi to Reberu); 6. "The Demon Lord's Castle" (魔王城, Maōjō); 7. "The Demon Lord" (魔王, Maō); 8. "Change the World" (廻天, Kaiten)
2	December 18, 2025	978-4-09-853809-6	January 12, 2027	978-1-9747-6964-3
Chapters 9–18
3	March 18, 2025	978-4-09-854026-6	—	—
Chapters 19–28
4	April 18, 2025	978-4-09-854082-2	—	—
Chapters 29–38
5	June 18, 2025	978-4-09-854147-8	—	—
Chapters 39–48
6	September 18, 2025	978-4-09-854270-3	—	—
Chapters 49–58
7	December 18, 2025	978-4-09-854372-4	—	—
59. "The Tree" (樹, Ki); 60. "The First Tower" (第1塔, Dai 1-tō); 61. "Allies" (味方, Mikata); 62. "Alive" (生きてる, Ikiteru); 63. "Fathers" (父親たち, Chichioya-tachi); 64. "Kids" (子供たち, Kodomo-tachi); 65. "Intent" (意志, Ishi); 66. "You Can Do It" (できる, Dekiru); 67. "Blooming" (開花, Kaika); 68. "Connections" (繋ぐ, Tsunagu)
8	May 18, 2026	978-4-09-854490-5	—	—
9	October 16, 2026	978-4-09-854857-6	—	—

== Reception ==
In the 2025 Next Manga Award, the series ranked 12th in the print manga category. The series was recommended by Frieren's social media accounts.

A columnist for Da Vinci liked the pacing of the story, which they felt helps create mystery and tension. They also liked the illustrations, which they felt matched the flow of the panels well. A columnist for Ciatr liked the main characters and felt they were developed well. They also praised the story, which they described as being similar to Frieren but with enough differences to feel unique. Comedian Akira Kawashima recommended the manga, describing it as "packed with all the current trends, but with an amazing balance".
