= Weekly Shōnen Sunday =

Japanese manga magazine

- Cover of the September 19, 1984 issue, featuring Urusei Yatsura
- Editor: Kazunori Oshima
- Former editors: Takenori Ichihara
- Categories: Shōnen manga
- Frequency: Weekly
- Circulation: 120,000; (July–September 2026)
- First issue: March 17, 1959; 67 years ago
- Company: Shogakukan
- Country: Japan
- Language: Japanese
- Website: Official website

Weekly Shōnen Sunday (Japanese: 週刊少年サンデー, Hepburn: Shūkan Shōnen Sandē) is a weekly shōnen manga magazine published in Japan by Shogakukan since March 1959. Contrary to its title, Weekly Shōnen Sunday issues are released on Wednesdays. Weekly Shōnen Sunday has sold over 1.8 billion copies since 1986, making it the fourth best selling manga magazine, only behind Weekly Shōnen Jump, Weekly Shōnen Magazine and Weekly Young Jump.

== History ==
Weekly Shōnen Sunday was first published on March 17, 1959, as a response to its rival Weekly Shōnen Magazine. The debut issue featured Shigeo Nagashima, the star player of the Yomiuri Giants on the cover, and a congratulatory article by Isoko Hatano, a noted child psychologist.

Despite its name, Weekly Shōnen Sunday is published on Wednesday. The "Sunday" in the name was the creation of its first editor, Kiichi Toyoda, who wanted the title to be evocative of a relaxing weekend.

Weekly Shōnen Sunday's mascot, Issue 1991-#37

Weekly Shōnen Sunday's distinctive "pointing finger" that appears in the lower corner of every page on the left side of the magazine made its subtle debut in the 4/5 issue from 1969. This understated feature, ever present but easily overlooked, was referenced as a plot element in 20th Century Boys. Sunday's more noticeable mascot, a helmeted fish, debuted in the 1980s.

Prior to the 1990s and 2000s no serial in Weekly Shōnen Sunday had run over 40 volumes, but that began to change with series such as Case Closed, Major, Inuyasha, Karakuri Circus, Kenichi: The Mightiest Disciple, Hayate the Combat Butler, Zettai Karen Children, and Be Blues!, which maintained a high level of popularity.

In a rare event due to the closeness of the two magazines' founding dates, Weekly Shōnen Sunday and Weekly Shōnen Magazine released a special combined issue on March 19, 2008. In addition, other commemorative events, merchandise, and manga crossovers were planned for the following year as part of the celebrations. The book Shonen Sunday 1983 was published on July 15, 2009, to celebrate the anniversary and the magazine's heyday. It reprints manga from 1983, such as Urusei Yatsura and Touch, and has interviews with their creators as well as artists who were inspired by the series from that period, such as Gosho Aoyama.

To celebrate Weekly Shōnen Sunday's 55th anniversary, 55 new manga series were launched in the print and online magazines Weekly Shōnen Sunday, Shōnen Sunday S, Ura Sunday, and Club Sunday throughout the year beginning in March 2014.

== Features ==
There are currently 29 manga titles being serialized in Weekly Shōnen Sunday. Out of them, Frieren: Beyond Journey's End is on hiatus; Magic Kaito is infrequently published; Case Closed and Kai-hen Wizards are serialized on an irregular basis; Major 2nd is serialized biweekly and Ad Astra per Aspera's continuation is yet to be announced.

Series title	Author(s)	Premiered
Ad Astra per Aspera (アド アストラ ペル アスペラ, Ado Asutora peru Asupera)	Kenjiro Hata	September 2015
Akira Failing in Love (百瀬アキラの初恋破綻中。, Momose Akira no Hatsukoi Hatan-chū)	Shinta Harekawa	August 2024
Albus Changes the World (廻天のアルバス, Kaiten no Arubasu)	Akihisa Maki, Miki Yatsubo	May 2024
Aozakura: Bōei Daigakukō Monogatari (あおざくら 防衛大学校物語)	Hikaru Nikaido	April 2016
Bus for Two (ふたりバス, Futari Basu)	Sakane Toyobayashi	November 2025
Case Closed (名探偵コナン, Meitantei Konan)	Gosho Aoyama	January 1994
Cosmograph (コスモグラフ, Kosumogurafu)	Wakabi Asayama	October 2026
Dealing with Mikadono Sisters Is a Breeze (帝乃三姉妹は案外、チョロい。, Mikadono Sanshimai wa Angai, Choroi)	Aya Hirakawa	December 2021
Fly Me to the Moon (トニカクカワイイ, Tonikaku Kawaii)	Kenjiro Hata	February 2018
Frieren: Beyond Journey's End (葬送のフリーレン, Sōsō no Furīren)	Kanehito Yamada, Tsukasa Abe	April 2020
Fujiwara-kun Kōkō Debut!! (不死原くん高校デビュー!!, Fujiwara-kun Kōkō Debyū!!)	Anji Matono	September 2026
Honey Creep	Mitsuharu Yanamoto	November 2026
Kai-hen Wizards (界変の魔法使い, Kaihen no Mahōtsukai)	Yellow Tanabe	September 2024
Kamibiki no Monarch (神引きのモナーク, Kamibiki no Monāku)	Jiro Sugiura, Okiumirei	April 2026
Kimi wa Akeboshi (君は明け星)	Takenori Ichihara, Aiko Koyama	January 2026
Magic Kaito (まじっく快斗, Majikku Kaito)	Gosho Aoyama	June 1987
Major 2nd	Takuya Mitsuda	March 2015
Mao	Rumiko Takahashi	May 2019
Musai no Shōkanshi (無才の召喚士)	UFO Nomura	July 2026
Mizu Polo (みずぽろ, Mizu Poro)	Miho Isshiki, Naoki Mizuguchi	November 2023
¡Paradón! (パラドン, Paradon)	Haruki Hajime, Kemuri Karakara	February 2026
Parashoppers (パラショッパーズ, Parashoppāzu)	Tsubasa Fukuchi	January 2025
Red Blue (レッドブルー, Reddo Burū)	Atsushi Namikiri	January 2022
Shibuya Near Family (シブヤニアファミリー, Shibuya Nia Famirī)	Kōji Kumeta	October 2021
Shippo to Gekirin (しっぽと逆鱗)	Yutaka	April 2026
Silver Mountain (シルバーマウンテン, Shirubā Maunten)	Kazuhiro Fujita	May 2025
Sleepy Princess in the Demon Castle (魔王城でおやすみ, Maōjō de Oyasumi)	Kagiji Kumanomata	May 2016
Tsumiki Ogami's Not-So-Ordinary Life (尾守つみきと奇日常。, Ogami Tsumiki to Ki Nichijō)	Miyu Morishita	October 2023
Utsuranain desu (写らナイんです)	Ruka Konoshima	March 2024

== Circulation ==
Year / Period	Weekly circulation	Magazine sales	Sales revenue (est.)	Issue price
1986	1,600,000	83,200,000	¥14,976,000,000	¥180
1987	1,300,000	67,600,000	¥12,168,000,000	¥180
1988	1,300,000	67,600,000	¥12,168,000,000	¥180
1989	1,400,000	72,800,000	¥13,104,000,000	¥180
1990	1,350,000	70,200,000	¥12,636,000,000	¥180
1991	1,350,000	70,200,000	¥12,636,000,000	¥180
1992	1,350,000	70,200,000	¥13,338,000,000	¥190
1993	1,270,000	66,040,000	¥12,547,600,000	¥190
1994	1,270,000	66,040,000	¥13,868,400,000	¥210
1995	1,400,000	72,800,000	¥15,288,000,000	¥210
1996	1,530,000	79,560,000	¥21,481,200,000	¥270
1997	1,650,000	85,800,000	¥23,166,000,000	¥270
1998	1,700,000	88,400,000	¥23,868,000,000	¥270
1999	1,630,000	84,760,000	¥22,885,200,000	¥270
2000	2,020,000	105,040,000	¥28,360,800,000	¥270
2001	1,500,000	78,000,000	¥21,060,000,000	¥270
2002	1,530,000	79,560,000	¥21,481,200,000	¥270
2003	1,310,000	68,120,000	¥18,392,400,000	¥270
2004	1,160,913	60,367,476	¥16,299,218,520	¥270
2005	1,068,265	55,549,780	¥14,998,440,600	¥270
January 2006 to August 2006	1,003,708	34,795,211	¥9,394,706,970	¥270
September 2006 to December 2006	1,010,000	17,506,667	¥4,726,800,090	¥270
2007	940,000	48,880,000	¥13,197,600,000	¥270
2008	873,438	45,418,776	¥12,263,069,520	¥270
January 2009 to September 2009	773,062	30,149,418	¥8,140,342,860	¥270
October 2009 to September 2010	678,917	35,303,684	¥9,531,994,680	¥270
October 2010 to September 2011	611,146	31,779,592	¥8,580,489,840	¥270
October 2011 to September 2012	539,521	28,055,092	¥7,574,874,840	¥270
October 2012 to September 2013	512,250	26,637,000	¥7,165,353,000	¥269
October 2013 to September 2014	456,375	23,731,500	¥6,407,505,000	¥270
October 2014 to September 2015	390,143	20,287,436	¥5,477,607,720	¥270
October 2015 to September 2016	350,521	18,227,092	¥4,921,314,840	¥270
October 2016 to September 2017	317,458	16,507,816	¥4,457,110,320	¥270
October 2017 to March 2018	302,167	7,856,342	¥2,121,212,340	¥270
1986 to March 2018	36,000,000	1,876,972,882	¥448,682,441,140 ($5.511 billion)	

== Editors-in-chief ==
- Kiichi Toyoda (1959–1960)
- Yoshio Kinoshita (1960–1963)
- Michio Tamio (1963–1965)
- Yunosuke Konishi (1965–1967)
- Yoshiya Takayanagi (1967–1969)
- Yoshio Kinoshita (1969–1970)
- Shizuo Watanabe (1970–1972)
- Keizo Inoue (1972–1977)
- Kazuki Tanaka (1977–1984)
- Koichiro Inomata (1984–1987)
- Harunori Kumagai (1987–1991)
- Takashi Hirayama (1991–1994)
- Harunori Kumagai (1994–1996)
- Toyohiko Okuyama (1996–2000)
- Shinichiro Tsuzuki (2000–2001)
- Shinichi Mikami (2001–2004)
- Masato Hayashi (2004–2009)
- Masaki Nawata (2009–2012)
- Yu Torimitsu (2012–2015)
- Takenori Ichihara (2015–2021)
- Kazunori Oshima (2021–present)

== International versions ==
Elex Media Komputindo published an Indonesian version of Weekly Shōnen Sunday titled Shōnen Star from 2005 to 2013.

Viz Media began a Shonen Sunday imprint for titles in North America; starting with Rumiko Takahashi's Rin-ne, which was released on October 20, 2009.

== See also ==
- Monthly Shōnen Sunday
