= List of manga published by Shogakukan =

A list of manga published by Shogakukan, listed by release date. For an alphabetical list, see Category:Shogakukan manga.

== 1950s ==
=== 1953 ===
- UTOPIA Saigo no Sekai Taisen

=== 1959 ===
- Dr. Thrill
- Dynamic 3
- Kaikyuu x Arawaru!!
- The Lone Ranger
- Maboroshi Taisho
- Ryuichi Yoru Banashi
- Tonkatsu-chan
- Uchuu Shōnen Tonda
- Umi no Ouji
- Zero Man

== 1960s ==
=== 1960 ===
- Boku wa Jonbe he
- Captain Ken
- Denko Red
- Kakedaze Dash
- Kon-chan
- Pink-chan
- Seibangou 0 Monogatari
- Shippo Eitaro
- Yarikuri Tengoku

=== 1961 ===
- Bun Bun
- Iga no Kagemaru
- Kon-chan Torimonocho
- Konchaasu Bon Taro
- Seton's Wild Animals
- Shiroi Pilot
- Shonen Kenia
- Uchuu Keibitai

=== 1962 ===
- Big 1
- Brave Dan
- Chibikko Chocho
- Kakero Tenba
- Osomatsu-kun
- Ozora no Chikai
- Tonga Series

=== 1963 ===
- Akuma no Oto
- Bakansu Kozo
- Chōjintachi
- Ganbare Kenta
- Holiday Run
- Katame Saru
- Kaze no Jirokichi
- Kurayami Godan
- Maboroshi Buntai
- Midori no Mujinto
- Robot-kun
- Sanpei Gekijō
- Submarine 707
- Yōki na Nakama
- Yumei ga Ippai Vacation

=== 1964 ===
- 007 Series
- Funky Boys
- Hoero! Racer
- Inazuma Ace
- Kogarashi Ippei
- Kotetsu Ningen Shiguma
- Kyuban Dasha
- Little Ghost Q-Taro
- Niji no Sentotai
- Pocket Rikishi
- Sebangō 0
- Yami no Sakon

=== 1965 ===
- 1 no 1 no 1
- The Amazing 3
- Attack Kobushi
- Berabo
- Captain Goro
- Ijiwaru Kyōju
- Kamui Gaiden
- Korya My Futoshi
- Kōryō
- Miracle A
- MM Santa
- Ore no Taiyo
- Ore wa Yaruzo
- Super Jetter

=== 1966 ===
- Abare Osho
- Akakage
- Akanbe Akanbo
- Boken Gaboten Shima
- Genjin Bibi
- Kaimushi Kabuton
- Oba-Q no Otoboke Gihyō
- Ryu no Hata
- Sabu to Ichi Torimono Hikae
- Shinigami Hakase
- Star 9
- Thriller Kyōju
- Thunder Kid
- The Vampires

=== 1967 ===
- Akatasuki Sentai
- Animal One
- Blue Submarine No. 6
- Captain Scarlet
- Captain Ultra
- Chōsen Yarō
- Danganko
- Dororo
- Genma Wars
- Giant Robo
- Gum Gum Punch
- Guriguri
- Hi no Maru Jindai
- Jikogu-kun
- Kamui Den
- Mizuki Shigeru Yōkai Gekijō
- Mōretsu Atarō
- Mou Retsu Atarou
- Oraa Guzura Dato
- Perman
- Shirato Sanpei Gekijō
- Tama no Uta
- Z to Yobareru Otoko

=== 1968 ===
- 21 Emon
- Ah!! Koshien
- Blue Zone
- Chikyu Number V7
- Doctor Tsururi
- Dokachin
- Golgo 13
- Inakappe Taishō
- Judo Boy
- Kappa no Sanpei
- The Laughing Salesman
- Matt Helm
- MJ
- Moero Nio
- Phoenix Jyo
- Sasuke
- Swallowing the Earth
- Tenamonya Ipponyari
- Unabara no Ken
- Utae!! Mustang
- Zubeko Tantei Ran

=== 1969 ===
- Chikai no Hata
- Devil King
- Doronko Kyujo
- Gen to Tsugumi
- Gunman / Fukushū no Mugonka
- Hitokui Tetsudo
- Kage Gari
- Karasu
- Kudabare!! Namida-kun
- Orochi: Blood
- Princess Knight
- Target
- Tensai Bakabon
- Ume-boshi no Denka
- Uragiri no Gunpoint
- Yami no Kaze

== 1970s ==
=== 1970 ===
- Again
- Bukkare Dan
- CM Yarou
- Dekkadeka
- Dame Oyaji
- Doraemon
- Go!! Go!! Nonsense
- Group Gin
- Keiji Yoshitani
- Maro
- Ode to Kirihito
- Otoko do Aho Koshien
- Red Colored Elegy
- The Shikippuru
- Tobenai Tsubasa
- Wandering Sun
- Yoake no Makki
- Zeni Geba

=== 1971 ===
- Abare Fubuki
- Challenge D
- Cyborg Ace
- The Foghorn Sounded
- Glass no No
- GeGeGe no Kitarō
- Hadashi no Bun
- Hato to Sakura
- Kaijin Jaguar Man
- Kenka no Bible
- Kokuhaku
- Rekka
- Rettsuragon
- The Return of Ultraman
- Ruthless Trap
- Seishun Dobaku
- Senbe
- Sokkyūya
- Subahen
- Tabidate! Hirarin
- Tamagawa-kun

=== 1972 ===
- Akado Suzunosuke
- Android Kikaider
- Arajin no Musuko
- Ayako
- The Drifting Classroom
- Dust 18
- Fuefuki Doji
- Fuma Kotaro
- Hiyoshi no Shiro
- Jinzō-Ningen Kikaider
- Joker e...
- Judo Sanka
- Kantaro Monogatari
- Kedaman
- Kibahashiri
- Koma ga Mau
- The Moon
- Nagareboshi Sub
- Oi! Boketan
- The Poe Clan
- Tatsu ga Kiru!
- Thunder Mask

=== 1973 ===
- Abu-san
- Catch Man
- Dororon Enma-kun
- Diamond Eye
- Fresh Blood of the Final Round
- Haguregumo
- Inazuman
- Jinjin no Jin
- Kuroi Washi
- Notari Matsutarō
- Okkaa Yakuza
- Ore wa Chokkaku
- The Song of Tentomushi
- Ultraman Taro

=== 1974 ===
- Dream Slugger
- First Human Giatrus
- Ganbare Robokon
- Getter Robo
- The Heart of Thomas
- Little Boy
- Musashi
- Oira Sukeban
- Otoko Gumi
- Pro Golfer Saru
- Shonen Friday
- Sunset on Third Street

=== 1975 ===
- Ace of Hearts
- A Blow for That Girl!
- Goemon Rokku
- Himitsu Sentai Gorenger
- Ikkyu-san
- Kamen Godamaru
- Kibasen
- Nora Gaki
- Shin Himitsu Sentai Gorenja Gokko
- Tenkaiichi Omonoten
- They Were Eleven

=== 1976 ===
- Boku Chan Sensei
- Cat Eyed Boy
- Doggu World
- Gamushara
- Ganbare Genki
- Ginrin Jaguar
- God Arm
- The Harsh Story of a Manga Artist
- Kaa-chan No. 1
- Kaze to Ki no Uta
- Makoto-chan
- Megido no Hi
- MW
- Panku Ponk
- Soggy Papa
- Survival
- Zoku Jūichinin Iru! Higashi no Chihei, Nishi no Towa

=== 1977 ===
- Akai Pegasus
- Dekin Boy
- Eiyu Shikkaku
- Esper Mami
- Galaxy Express 999
- Ginrin Tama
- Gyag Ariki
- Katsumi
- Kiteretsu Daihyakka
- Seishun no Kawa
- Tobetobe Tonbi
- Tsukiya
- Whimsical Punch

=== 1978 ===
- Asari-chan
- California Story
- Hit and Run
- Game Center Arashi
- Ken
- Majokko Tickle
- Nijitte Monogatari
- Nine
- Pair of Aces
- Phantom Burai
- Ryokudo-kun
- Seishun Dobutsuen Zoo
- Space Opera Chugaku
- Teens
- Urusei Yatsura
- Wind in the Green Leaves
- A Word from the Freeloader
- Yakyu Mushi
- The Youthful Path

=== 1979 ===
- Abare Taikai
- Akkan Man
- Area 88
- Bangai Koshien
- Basubon Tokkyu
- Cyborg 009
- Dash Kappei
- Doro Fighter
- Funsen Yodels
- Futari no Shogun
- Goronbomatsu
- Hotto Keddogu
- Tsuribaka Nisshi
- Wanten Tantei

== 1980s ==
=== 1980 ===
- Doraemon Long Stories
- Hiatari Ryōkō!
- Hockey Wolf
- I Love Ayume
- Katte ni Yorimichi
- Pro Wrestling Superstar Retsuden
- Maison Ikkoku
- Maris the Chojo
- Miyuki
- The Monster Kid
- Otoko Oozora
- Sasuga no Sarutobi
- Seishun Knuckle 4
- Super Rider
- Tadaima Jugyouchuu!
- Uridase! Panpusu
- The Visitor

=== 1981 ===
- Chance
- Damekko Yuki-chan
- Dokkiri Doctor
- Family!
- Futari Daka
- Hashire! Haruma
- Hatsukoi Scandal
- Hidamari no Ki
- Human Crossing
- Justy
- Musashi no Ken
- Neri Wasabi Kyoso Kyoku
- Ninja Hattori-kun
- Sayonara Sankaku
- Ten Made Agare
- Tokukyu GO!
- Touch
- Wounded Man
- Yuta Yunaika

=== 1982 ===
- Dart Tokyu
- Georgie!
- Gu Gu Ganmo
- Hashire Kakeru
- Hi no Tama Boy
- The Legend of Kamui
- Kaze no Senshi Dan
- Kochantorei
- Love Z
- Nanka Ayakai!?
- Ore wa Namazumono
- Pinto Pittashi!
- Saraba Jinrui
- Torai Torai

=== 1983 ===
- Alpen Rose
- Blazing Transfer Student
- Fire Tripper
- Green Grass
- Harumi 120%
- Iron Virgin Jun
- Kisshō Tennyo
- Laughing Target
- Night
- Oishinbo
- Prefectural Earth Defense Force
- Seiunji
- Sono Ki ni Natte Mo
- Sono Na mo Agaro
- Takeru
- Yoki no Kamome

=== 1984 ===
- A, A Prime
- Ao Kobushi Okami
- Blizzard Princess
- Datsusen Gennen
- Eichi Man
- Fancy Dance
- Fighting Sweeper
- Harukana Bishi
- Just Meet
- Megunchi Monogatari
- Mermaid Saga
- No. 1 Linna
- Pro Wrestling Taishofu
- Purple Eyes in the Dark
- Ragnarok Guy
- Shirobe
- Sprinter
- Striker Retsuden
- Unico
- ZINGY

=== 1985 ===
- Aosora Floppy
- Balancer
- B.B.
- Banana Fish
- Birdy the Mighty
- Boyfriend
- Chimpui
- Chotto Yoroshiku
- F
- Ganbare, Kickers!
- Hound Eleven
- Kyūkyoku Chōjin R
- Pineapple Army
- Magical Emi, the Magic Star
- Mai, the Psychic Girl
- Marginal
- Night Bird
- Rikugun Nakano Yobiko
- Short Program
- Suteki ni Yabanjin
- Tenchi Muyo/This Side Up
- Tsurupika Hagemaru
- To-y

=== 1986 ===
- Aji Ichi Monme
- Caravan Kidd
- Crying Freeman
- Doki Doki Heartbeat
- Famicom Runner: Takahashi Meijin Monogatari
- Happi Chokuzen
- Kaze wo Nuke!
- Maboroshi Umaboroshi
- O~i! Ryōma
- Panic Hoteishiki
- Pastel Yumi, the Magic Idol
- Ryū
- Slow Step
- Tosho Boy
- Xenon
- Yagami-kun no Katei no Jijō
- Yawara!

=== 1987 ===
- Aozora Shot
- Ayame ni Oteage!
- Bokura wa v3
- Bucchigiri
- Chichi Monogatari
- Dash! Yonkuro
- GOAL
- Gringo
- I'm Namu
- Joshi Chugakusei Note
- Kamen Rider Black
- Kogen Mura he Yokoso
- Koshien ga Suki!
- Kotton Tetsumaru
- Kuruman BOY
- Magic Kaito
- Momoka Typhoon
- One-pound Gospel
- Ranma ½
- Rough
- Smile for Mii
- Sports Tenko Mari
- Suiyo Bokenasu Shiteseki
- Totsugeki Wolf

=== 1988 ===
- Akai Pegasus II Sho
- Angel
- Bakkure Ippei
- Bear Mader Ryusuke
- Bimi Paradise
- Dokachin Kid
- Genji Monogatari
- Hikari Ikanga Gakuen
- Kenji
- Kenta Yarimasu!
- Kyō Kara Ore Wa!!
- Makoto-chan
- Master Keaton
- Matador
- My Pace Futaro
- Mobile Police Patlabor
- Seventeen Cop
- Shin Kiteretsu Daihyakka
- Tearful Soldier
- Tokyo Love Story
- Ucchare Goshogawara
- Wind Up!!
- Yaiba

=== 1989 ===
- Ano Ko ni 1000%
- DaDa!
- Dance till Tomorrow
- Dinosaur Carnival
- Dr. Shiina no Kyoikuteki Shido!!
- Free Kick!
- Geo-Police Joe
- Heavy
- Hoshikuzu Paradise
- Kenta Yarimasu!
- Kojiro
- MAD STONE
- Heisei-ban Makoto-chan
- Mash
- Ninkimono de Iko
- Obi wo gyutto ne!
- Otokichi-kun no Piano Monogatari
- Seishun Tiebreak!
- Shōnen
- Spriggan
- Terrible Shōnen-dan
- Tuck In
- Utsurun Desu.

== 1990s ==
=== 1990 ===
- Amaku Kiken na Nampa Deka
- Baron
- Basara
- Chiku Chiku Uni Uni
- Even a Monkey Can Draw Manga
- Getter Robo Go
- Heavy Metal Koshien
- Junk Party
- Kaze no Daichi
- Makoto Call!
- Niji-iro Tohgarashi
- Okami-san
- RATS
- Sanctuary
- Shishunki Miman Okotowari
- Super Mario-Kun
- Tasuke, the Samurai Cop
- Tatoeba Konna Love Song
- Tough
- Unoken no Bakuhatsu Ugyaa!!
- Ushio and Tora
- Waltz in a White Dress
- Wangan Midnight
- Welcome
- Yugengaisha Shinahyakkaten

=== 1991 ===
- Ao no Fūin
- Benkei in New York
- The Doraemons
- Fullmetal Boxer
- Ghost Sweeper Mikami
- Go!! Southern Ice Hockey Club
- Hono no Ninjaman
- Kyō Kara Ore Wa!!
- Lucky Guy
- Makasete Eruna
- Mizuiro Jidai
- Ore wa Otoko Da! Kunio-kun
- PATI-PATI
- Rappa S.S.
- Samurai Crusader
- Sengoku Koshien: Kyū inu-shi densetsu
- Twinkle Twinkle Idol Star
- Very Good Manten!!
- Yoban Sādo

=== 1992 ===
- Asunaro Hakusho
- Bara no Tame ni
- Bokkō
- Bow Wow
- Chōryū Senki Sauros Knight
- Doki Doki! Enma-kun
- Fu·ta·ri
- Fushigi Yûgi
- Gallery Fake
- Geki Saru Theater
- H2
- Hiten Boso Densho MAOH
- Iguana Girl
- Jesus
- Jinbē
- Jodan Jyanai yo!
- Kaitei Jinrui Anchovy
- Kakutou Oumonogo Byun Boy
- Kotei Senshi Hankyu
- Lilac Nocturne
- Ogre Slayer
- Ojisan Boy!! Shogaku Chugakusei
- Oretachi no Field
- Ossu! Shorenji
- PC Genjin-kun
- Reverser: Jikū no Ryūkihei
- Sonic the Hedgehog
- Super Dimensional Fortress Macross II: Lovers Again
- Super Mario Adventures
- Tokio
- Tokon Shojo
- Tokyo Daigaku Monogatari
- Zoku Shishunki Miman Okotowari

=== 1993 ===
- Byakuren no Fang
- B•F Fish Boys
- Blue Spring
- A Cruel God Reigns
- Gakuen Teikoku Ore wa Jubei!
- Geki Tori Theater
- Happy!
- Itadakimasu!
- LOVe
- Mama wa Shōgaku 4 Nensei
- Muka Muka Paradise
- Osaruna Masaru-kun
- Tekkonkinkreet
- Uwasa no Otokomae

=== 1994 ===
- Arigatō
- Atashi ni Tsuiterasshai
- Azumi
- Bakusō Kyōdai Let's & Go!!
- Ganba! Fly High
- Detective Conan
- Drum Knuckle -Final Fight-
- Geki Inu Theater
- Jaja Uma Grooming Up!
- Magnolia Waltz
- Major
- Masurao Hiongiseiki
- Monster
- Mugen Zero
- Oretachi ni Asu wa Naissu
- Oyani wa Naisho
- R·PRINCESS
- Samurai Shodown
- Shout!
- Super Street Fighter II Cammy
- Tokyo Boys & Girls
- Tonde Burin
- Wedding Peach

=== 1995 ===
- Aho Aho Gakuen
- Burst Ball Barrage!! Super B-Daman
- Dan Doh!!
- Dolphin Brain
- Enya KODOMO Ninpocho
- Firefighter! Daigo of Fire Company M
- Flame of Recca
- Go-Go Ecchan no Caster Mairuzo!
- Kanon
- Kocchi Muite! Miiko
- Koimonogatari
- Mint de Kiss Me
- Mojacko
- Red River
- Sabaku no Yakyubu
- Sakura Diaries
- Sodatte Darling!!
- Tokyo Bancho
- Wedding Peach Ai Tenshi Tanjou hen

=== 1996 ===
- Accidents
- Angel Lip
- Ceres, Celestial Legend
- Four Shōjo Stories
- Hikenden Kira
- InuYasha
- Meibutsu!! Utsukemono Honpo
- Monkey Turn
- Nagisa Me Kounin
- Over Rev!
- Ping Pong
- Pocket Monsters
- Revolutionary Girl Utena
- Shinsei Motemote Oukoku
- Strain
- Taiyo no Senshi Boka Boka
- Tennen Senshi G
- Tokyo Juliet
- Warp Boy
- Yasha

=== 1997 ===
- B.B. Explosion
- Bomberman B-Daman Bakugaiden
- Cutie Honey Flash
- Devil & Devil
- Dolphin Brain
- Eagle: The Making of an Asian-American President
- Fancy Zatsuwazadan
- Forbidden Dance
- Gain
- Hamtaro
- Karakuri Circus
- Kaze Hikaru
- Mach GoGoGo!
- Magical Pokémon Journey
- Mo Sungoi!!
- Over Rev!
- Pokémon Adventures
- Pokémon: The Electric Tale of Pikachu
- Project ARMS
- Sensual Phrase
- Super Yo-Yo
- Tuxedo Gin
- Ushio and Tora Gaiden
- Windmill

=== 1998 ===
- A Distant Neighborhood
- Appare Jipangu!
- Bōken Shōnen
- Bomberman B-Daman Bakugaiden V
- Crash Bandicoot—Dansu! de Jump! na Daibōken
- Ichi the Killer
- Katte ni Kaizō
- The Legend of Zelda: Ocarina of Time
- Salad Days
- Shishunki Miman Okotowari Kanketsuhen
- Spin Out
- Taro the Space Alien
- TEN MAN
- Umizaru
- Uzumaki
- Whistle!
- Wild Act
- The Wind of Fight
- Yoiko

=== 1999 ===
- 20th Century Boys
- Ask Dr. Rin!
- Ayumu no Koma
- Believers
- Beyblade
- Binetsu Shōjo
- Cheeky Angel
- Chocolat
- Corrector Yui
- Dainamu Itou!
- Duel Masters
- Fantasista
- Grizzly Bear Story
- Heat
- Kamoshika!
- Men Soul!!!
- New Town Heroes
- Passport Blue
- Pukupuku Natural Circular Notice
- Southern Cross
- Tatakae! Ryōzanpaku Shijō Saikyō
- Tokyo Keiji

== 2000s ==
=== 2000 ===
- Brave Saru s
- Chicago
- Chō Ikusei Shinwa Pagunasu
- Dobutsu no Kame-chan
- Dan Doh!! Xi
- Dorabase
- Dorohedoro
- Doubt!!
- Dr. Kotō Shinryōjo
- G Senjō Heaven's Door
- GoGo Monster
- Heisei Tokimeki Rikishi Punyarin
- Hot Gimmick
- Imadoki!
- Itsumo Misora
- The Legend of Zelda: Majora's Mask
- Libero Revolution
- Marvelous
- Mister Japan
- Moonlight Mile
- Neo Gomanism Manifesto Special – On Taiwan
- No. 5
- Omunehari
- Saikano
- Sexy Voice and Robo
- Shin Aji Ichi Monme
- Sukimasuki
- Takeru Michi
- Togari
- Tsukiji Uogashi Sandaime

=== 2001 ===
- 7 Seeds
- Akuma na Eros
- Alice 19th
- Amakusa 1637
- Blade of the Phantom Master
- Bullet
- Croket!
- Do! Rill!!
- Grandpa Danger
- Gyo
- HEAT WAVE
- HORIZON
- Iruka!!
- Kakene nashi no LOVE torihiki
- Katsu!
- Konjiki no Gash!!
- The Law of Ueki
- MegaMan NT Warrior
- Mirmo de Pon!
- Night Lovers
- Pangea no Musume Kunie
- Panyo Panyo Di Gi Charat
- RahXephon
- Rising Sun
- Shigeshida ☆ Shokun!
- Zatch Bell!

=== 2002 ===
- 365 no Yuki
- Battle B-Daman
- Black Lagoon
- Bomberman Jetters
- BREAKTHROUGH! ~Niji no Petal~
- Chain of Pearls
- D-Live!!
- Densetsu no Starfy
- Fall in Love Like a Comic!
- Fight no Akatsuki
- Fighting Beauty Wulong
- First Girl
- Forza! Hidemaru
- Girls Saurus
- Haou Airen
- Idejuu!
- Ichiban-yu Kanata
- Kare First Love
- Kenichi: The Mightiest Disciple
- Kiichi!!
- Kimi no Kakera
- Kōkō Afro Tanaka
- Let's Go!! Bomberman Jetters
- Midori Days
- Otherworld Barbara
- Otori Bomber
- Perfect Partner
- Pet
- Rainbow: Nisha Rokubō no Shichinin
- Rec
- Saikyō Densetsu Kurosawa
- Senpuu no Tachibana
- Sonnanja neyo
- Team Medical Dragon
- We Were There
- Yakitate!! Japan

=== 2003 ===
- A Spirit of the Sun
- Absolute Boyfriend
- Beauty Pop
- Bokurano: Ours
- Danchi Tomoo
- Dash & Spin: Super Fast Sonic
- Dawn of the Arcana
- Denjin 1 Gō
- Homunculus
- Girls Saurus DX
- Kekkaishi
- Kowashiya Gamon
- Kuromatsu - The Nobelest
- Kurosagi
- Kurozakuro
- MÄR
- Freesia
- Fushigi Yûgi Genbu Kaiden
- Gaku: Minna no Yama
- Love & SexSHO-COMI Pink Label
- Ore-sama wa?
- PEACE MAKER
- Pluto
- Pocket Monsters Ruby-Sapphire
- Rakugaki Fighter ~Hero of Saint Paint~
- Ren'aishijōshugi
- Rideback
- Robot Boys
- Rockman Zero
- Sand Chronicles
- Tokyo Eitīzu
- Shonen Thunder
- Toritsu Mizusho!
- Uttare Daikichi!
- Wild Life
- What a Wonderful World!
- Zetsubō ni Kiku Kusuri
- Zoku Manga Mitaina Koi Shitai!

=== 2004 ===
- AM Driver
- Backstage Prince
- Bambino!
- Bengoshi no Kuzu
- Binbō Shimai Monogatari
- Chūtai Afro Tanaka
- Codename Babyface
- The Cornered Mouse Dreams of Cheese
- Dan Doh! Next Generation
- Doshiro de Gozaru
- Eve no Nemuri
- Happy Hustle High
- Hayate the Combat Butler
- Honey × Honey Drops
- Kaikisenban! Juugorou
- Kamikaze Girls
- Keshikasu-kun
- Kingyo Used Books
- Kirarin Revolution
- Kowashiyagamon
- Kurozakuro
- Last Inning
- Love Celeb
- Monkey High!
- Pocket Monsters Emerald: Challenge! Battle Frontier
- Pokémon Colosseum: Snatcher Leo
- Ratchet & Clank: Bang Bang Bang! Critical Danger of the Galaxy Legend
- Romance of Darkness
- Shin Nijitte Monogatari
- Shishunki Keiji Minoru Kobayashi
- Socrates in Love
- Toyuki
- Ushijima the Loan Shark
- Wedding Peach Young Love

=== 2005 ===
- Ai Kora
- Ani-Funjatta!
- Ayakashido Horai
- Blizzard Axel
- Cross Game
- Doraemon+
- Duel Masters: Fighting Edge
- Fluffy, Fluffy Cinnamoroll
- Hakuba no Ōji-sama
- Happy Happy Clover
- House of Five Leaves
- Idol Ace
- Ikigami: The Ultimate Limit
- Kobato
- The Law of Ueki Plus
- Lord
- Miagete Goran
- Mogura no Uta
- Naisho no Tsubomi
- Neko Navi
- Pokémon Mystery Dungeon: Ginji's Rescue Team
- Psychic Squad
- Saikyō! Toritsu Aoizaka Kōkō Yakyūbu
- Solanin
- Train Man: Densha Otoko
- Twin Princess of Wonder Planet
- Zettai Karen Children
- A Zoo in Winter

=== 2006 ===
- A Penguin's Troubles
- Ai Ore!
- BakéGyamon
- Beast Master
- Black Bird
- Bushin
- Butterflies, Flowers
- Chitei Shonen Chappy
- Cirque du Freak
- Children of the Sea
- Crash B-Daman
- Densetsu no Starfy R
- Fist of the North Star
- Geki ai motto motometai
- Gokujō!! Mecha Mote Iinchō
- Golden★Age
- Grandliner
- Harunokuni
- Heaven's Will
- Hijiri Kessho Albatross
- Honey Hunt
- Hoshi no Furumachi
- Jormungand
- Jibo no Hoshi
- Kamisama Dolls
- The Legend of Zelda: The Minish Cap
- MÄR Omega
- Midnight Secretary
- Pocket Monsters DP
- RANGEMAN
- Shin'ya Shokudō
- Shiikuhime
- Shirokuma Cafe
- Takemitsuzamurai
- Tasukete! Flower Man
- Umimachi Diary

=== 2007 ===
- 21st Century Boys
- Aoi Honō
- Dengeki Daisy
- Dennō Coil: The Comics
- Dive!!
- Gamble!
- Goodnight Punpun
- Happy Kappy
- Hitohira no Koi ga Furu
- Ifrit: Danzai no Enjin
- I'll Give It My All... Tomorrow
- Jōkyō Afro Tanaka
- Joō no Hana
- Kamurobamura-e
- Kids on the Slope
- Kiichi VS
- Kongō Banchō
- Kunai Den
- Kyō, Koi o Hajimemasu
- Machi de Uwasa no Tengu no Ko
- Maoh: Juvenile Remix
- Mari to Koinu no Monogatari
- Marine Hunter
- Meteorite Breed
- Mysterious Joker
- Obou Samba
- Ochanigosu.
- Rhapsody in Heaven
- Sakura Gari
- Tomehane! Suzuri Kōkō Shodōbu

=== 2008 ===
- Aji Ichi Monme - Dokuritsu Hen
- Arata: The Legend
- Artist Acro
- Beyblade: Metal Fusion
- Channel wa sono mama!
- Chibi Devi!
- Duel Masters: Star Cross
- Hyde & Closer
- Inazuma Eleven
- Joō no Hana
- King Golf
- Lost+Brain
- Mitsuboshi no Speciality
- Mixim 11
- Moonlight Act
- Onidere
- Piece
- Pokémon Diamond and Pearl Adventure!
- Saijō no Meii
- Shin Kurosagi
- Shitsuren Chocolatier
- Shut Hell
- Suki Desu Suzuki-kun!!
- Traumeister
- The World God Only Knows

=== 2009 ===
- Afterschool Charisma
- Akira
- Asagiro
- Azumanga Daioh: Supplementary Lessons
- Bambino! Second
- Birthday
- Chōdokyū Shōjo 4946
- D no Maō
- Daisan Sekai no Nagai
- Dawn of the Arcana
- Defense Devil
- Denno Yuki Club
- Gakushin Ou - Vero Musica
- Happy Marriage!?
- Hajimete no Aku
- Hallelujah Overdrive!
- Hime Gal Paradise
- I Am a Hero
- Itsuka Omae to Jiruba o
- Itsuwaribito
- Jewelpet
- Jio to Ôgon to Kinjirareta Mahô
- Kanojo wa Uso o Aishisugiteru
- Kenryoku no Inu Police Wan!
- Kieyuku Shōjo
- Kōkō Kyūji Zawa-san
- Kokoro Button
- Kyō no Asuka Show
- The Legend of Zelda: Phantom Hourglass
- Let's Play with Yvonne
- Lilpri
- Lindbergh
- Magi: The Labyrinth of Magic
- Mahō Gyōshōnin Roma
- Mahō no Iroha!
- Makoto no Ōja
- Manekoi
- Mirai no Football
- Mushibugyo
- Nobunaga Concerto
- Nozoki Ana
- Number One Kaidoh
- Otoko no Isshō
- Otome Genocide
- Pin to Kona
- Ping Pong Rush
- Q and A
- Rin-ne
- Samurai High School
- Seishinshi
- Shōgaku ni Nyansei
- Sprite
- Super-Dreadnought Girl 4946
- Takanashi-san
- Takkoku!!!
- The!! Beach Stars
- Together Sugarbunnies
- Tomorrows
- Tsuuru!
- Undead
- Welcome to the El-Palacio
- Yaoyoroo!
- Yoshitō-sama

== 2010s ==
=== 2010 ===
- Alice in Borderland
- Ane no Kekkon
- Arago ~London Shikei Tokushu Hanzai Sōsakan~
- Baku Tech! Bakugan
- Bengoshi no Kuzu Dainishin
- Chiisaihito Aoba Jidou Soudansho Monogatari
- Dangerous Jii-san Ja
- A Drunken Dream and Other Stories
- Duel Hero: Dash
- Duel Masters: Legendary Champion
- Flower and the Beast
- Futagashira
- GOGO♪ Tamagotchi!
- Hanamote Katare
- Hideout
- Kaitai Shinsho 0
- Koutetsu no Hanappashira
- Kunisaki Izumo no Jijō
- Misaki, Number 1!!
- Neko kare kūru Sho-comi men' s collection
- Niji-iro Prism Girl
- Pocket Monsters HGSS
- Saijo no Meii ~The King of Neet~
- Saijo wa? Straight!!
- Sasurai Afro Tanaka
- Sengoku Yatagarasu
- Shut Hell
- Sunny
- Taberu Dake
- T.R.A.P.
- Washi ga Shishou Zeyo!

=== 2011 ===
- Anagle Mole
- Asahinagu
- Asaoka High School Baseball Club Diary: Over Fence
- B-Daman Crossfire
- Be Blues! - Ao ni Nare
- BUYUDEN
- Danball Senki Kaidō Jin Gaiden
- Dōse Mō Nigerarenai
- Duel Masters Victory
- Futagashira
- GAN☆KON
- Inazuma Eleven GO
- Inubu! -Bokura no Shippo Senki
- Jinrui wa Suitai Shimashita: Nonbirishita Hōkoku
- Jōjū Senjin!! Mushibugyō
- Little Battlers Experience
- Majestic Prince
- Nijitte Monogatari
- Nozomi to Mikio
- Osumojii! Tsukasa no Ikkan
- Pocket Monsters BW
- Pocket Monsters RéBURST
- Pretty Rhythm: Aurora Dream
- Puriri! Lilpri
- Runway wo ? Produce!!
- Shichigatsu no Hone
- Silver Spoon
- Soul Lord 2
- Ultimate Otaku Teacher
- Ultraman

=== 2012 ===
- Age 12
- AKB48 Satsujin jiken
- Ane log - Aiko Neesan no Tomaranai Monologue
- Area D Inou Ryouiki
- Aura: Koga Maryuin's Last War
- B-Daman Fireblast
- Beyblade: Shogun Steel
- Duel Masters Revolution
- Fantasista Stella
- Hachimitsu ni Hatsukoi
- Hime Hajike
- Jinrui wa Suitai Shimashita: Nonbirishita Hōkoku 4-koma
- Jinrui wa Suitai Shimashita: Yōsei, Shimasu ka?
- Jūhan Shuttai!
- Kengan Ashura
- Koakumaouden Senkore!
- Kujaku Ō Rising
- Kyōgaku Kōkou no Genjitsu
- Levius
- Master Keaton Remaster
- Miseinen Dakedo Kodomo Janai
- Mix
- Mob Psycho 100
- Mobile Suit Gundam Thunderbolt
- My Youth Romantic Comedy Is Wrong, As I Expected @ comic
- Nadeshiko no Kiseki Kawasumi Nahomi Monogatari
- Pretty Rhythm: Dear My Future
- Sasami-san@Ganbaranai
- Shiki no Zenjitsu
- Shin Dorabase
- Shin Kurosagi Kanketsu-hen
- Shūmatsu no Laughter
- So Cute it Hurts!!
- Sword Gai
- Tadashii Kodomo no Tsukurikata!
- Yo-kai Watch
- Yume no Shizuku, Kin no Torikago

=== 2013 ===
- 37.5°C no Namida
- After School Dice Club
- Aikatsu! Official Fanbook
- Anoko no Toriko
- Birdmen
- Character Times
- Chōsuinō kei
- Danball Senki Wars
- Disu × Komi
- Future Card Buddyfight
- GOGO Tamagotchi! Dream
- Hyōkyūhime×Tokiwagi Kantoku no Kajō na Aijō
- Infinite Stratos
- Keijo!!!!!!!!
- Killing Bites
- Koi, pinku. Watashi no kimochi, kiite kureru?
- Kokushi Musō!
- Levius
- Magi: Adventure of Sinbad
- Magical Star Kanon 100%
- My Little Pony: Friendship Is Magic (produced by Akira Himekawa, not related to IDW comic series)
- Nobelu
- Penguin no Mondai +
- Pretty Rhythm: Rainbow Live
- Sayonara Sorcier
- Shin Kurosawa: Saikyō Densetsu
- Teasing Master Takagi-san
- True Love
- The Unlimited: Hyōbu Kyōsuke
- Yo-kai Watch: Exciting Nyanderful Days
- Yugami-kun ni wa tomodachi ga inai

=== 2014 ===
- 4-Panel Yo-kai Watch: Geragera Manga Theater
- 1518!
- After the Rain
- Aikatsu!: Next Phase
- Aikatsu!: Secret Story
- Ashita wa Doyōbi
- Atom: The Beginning
- A-un
- Bakusō Kyōdai Let's & Go!! Return Racers!!
- Bōkyaku no Sachiko
- Captain Earth
- Chi no Kyokuchi - Daiya no King-hen
- Chrono Monochrome
- Dagashi Kashi
- Dead Dead Demon's Dededede Destruction
- Devilman Saga
- Dezicon
- Eiga to Tenshi
- Ginkai no Speed Star
- Ginpaku no Paladin - Seikishi
- Guardians of the Louvre
- Heavens Runner Akira
- Helck
- Hengoku no Schwester
- Hibiki: Shōsetsuka ni Naru Hōhō
- Hikari-Man
- The Idolmaster Million Live!
- Imawa no Kuni no Alice - Daiya no King
- Imawa no Kuni no Alice - Spade no King
- It's My Life
- Jinsei
- Joker Game
- Kamen Rider Kuuga
- Kami nomi zo Shiru Sekai: On the Train
- Kedamame
- Kenkō de Bunkateki na Saitei Gendo no Seikatsu
- Kiriwo Terrible
- Lady Jewelpet
- The Legendary Hero Is Dead!
- Nani mo Nai Kedo Sora wa Aoi
- Nozo x Kimi - 2-nen-sei-hen
- Oishii Kamishama
- Oyasumi Karasu, Mata Kite ne
- Para Para Days
- The Pilot's Love Song
- Pocket Monsters XY
- Pretty Rhythm: All Star Selection
- Princess Maison
- PriPara
- Psyche Matashitemo
- QQ Sweeper
- Santiago: Rebellion Shimabara
- Sensou Gejikou
- Shinkon ♥ gentei mesukōseidakedo, kekkon shimasu
- Tasogare Memorandum
- Tokusatsu Gagaga

=== 2015 ===
- 100% Pascal-sensei
- Ad Astra per Aspera
- Ageku no Hate no Kanon
- Aikatsu!: Go! Go! Go!
- Alice on Border Road
- Akatsuki no bōkun
- Amano Megumi wa Sukidarake!
- And-Pair
- Aoashi
- Battle Game in 5 Seconds
- Burning Kabaddi
- The Case of Hana & Alice
- Coffee & Vanilla
- Dance Dance Danseur
- Furo Girl!
- Fushigi Yûgi Byakko Ibun
- Ginrō Blood Bone
- Hatsukoi Zombie
- Hyper Dash! Yonkuro
- Infini-T Force
- Komasan 〜A Time for Fireworks and Miracles〜
- Kotaro Lives Alone
- Licca-chan
- Love Is Like a Cocktail
- Major 2nd
- Million Yen Women
- Nanoha Yougashiten no Ii Shigoto
- Nippen!
- Osake wa Fūfu ni Natte kara
- Our Dreams at Dusk
- PriPri Chi-chan!!
- Queen's Quality
- Rion-san, Meiwakadesu
- Ritasu 2-kobun no suteki
- Saezuri high school OK-bu!
- Shiawase Afro Tanaka
- Takunomi
- Tenshi to Akuto!!
- Tokiwa Kitareri!!
- Tokyo Alien Bros.
- Tutti!
- The Unlimited: Hyōbu Kyōsuke - WANDERER
- The Water Dragon's Bride
- Yo-kai Watch Busters
- Yo-kai Watch: 4-Panel Pun-Club

=== 2016 ===
- Aji Ichi Monme - Sekai no naka no washoku Hen
- Aikatsu Stars!
- Amano Megumi wa Sukidarake!
- Aozakura: Bouei Daigakukou Monogatari
- B-PROJECT Mousou＊Scandal
- Beyblade Burst
- Beyblade Rising
- Eisen Flügel
- Fureru to Kikoeru
- Hen na Mono Mikke!
- Hiiragi-sama wa Jibun wo Sagashiteiru
- How Heavy Are the Dumbbells You Lift?
- Imōto Sae Ireba Ii. @comic
- Jinmen
- Kamiwaza Wanda
- Keep Your Hands Off Eizouken!
- Komi Can't Communicate
- Maiko-san chi no Makanai-san
- Mayoiga ~Tsumi to Batsu~
- Moshi Moshi, Terumi Desu
- My Solo Exchange Diary
- Oni wo Tadorite Ikuseisou
- Otokonoko Zuma
- Persona 5
- RYOKO
- Sandē hi Kagakukenkyūjo
- Sanrio Boys
- Seton Academy: Join the Pack!
- Sleepy Princess in the Demon Castle
- Sōbōtei Kowasubeshi
- Sōkyū Boys
- Versailles of the Dead
- The Violence Action
- Whistle! W
- Y no Hakobune

=== 2017 ===
- Akagari: The Red Rat in Hollywood
- Ao no Orchestra
- Ariadne in the Blue Sky
- Asoko de Hataraku Musubu-san
- Babel
- Blood on the Tracks
- The Concierge at Hokkyoku Department Store
- Daiku no Hatō
- Don't Call it Mystery
- Downfall
- The Duke of Death and His Maid
- Fushigi Yûgi Byakko Senki
- Future Card Buddyfight Ace
- Fuuto PI
- Gaishū Isshoku!
- Gallery Fake
- Gigant
- Hada Camera
- Hana ni Arashi
- Hoankan Evans no Uso
- Jagaaan
- Karakai Jōzu no (Moto) Takagi-san
- Kimajime-hime to Bunbōgu-ōji
- Koi ni Koisuru Yukari-chan
- Kusuriya no Hitorigoto: Maomao no Koukyuu Nazotoki Techou
- Let's & Go!! Tsubasa, the Next Racers
- Marry Grave
- Mujirushi: The Sign of Dreams
- Nigatsu no Shōsha
- Ningyohime no Gomen ne Gohan
- No Longer Human
- Pocket Monsters Sun and Moon
- Re:Creators
- Re:Creators One More!
- Revolutionary Girl Utena: After the Revolution
- Saitsuyo Densetsu Nakane
- Sexy Tanaka-san
- Shōwa Tennō Monogatari
- Snack World
- Tantei Xeno to Nanatsu no Satsujin Misshitsu
- Tokachi Hitoribocchi Nōen
- Yōkai Giga

=== 2018 ===
- Aikatsu Friends!
- Bakutsuri Bar Hunter
- Batman Ninja
- Chrono Ma:gia: Mugen no Haguruma
- Chrono Ma:gia:Toki no Shōkansha to Shiraha no Hanayome
- Coffee & Vanilla: Black
- Detective Conan: Zero's Tea Time
- Fly Me to the Moon
- Gofun-go no Sekai
- How Do We Relationship?
- Idol × Warrior Miracle Tunes! Yume no Harmony
- Kimi wa 008
- Kiratto Pri Chan
- Magic x Warrior Magimajo Pures!: Magical na Mainichi
- Memesis
- Promise Cinderella
- REIGEN
- Shinkurō, Hashiru!
- switch
- Yūsha Sagawa to Ano Futari-hen
- Yuzuki-san Chi no Yon Kyōdai
- Zoids Wild

=== 2019 ===
- 100 Nichi Go ni Shinu Wani
- Aikatsu on Parade!
- As the Demon King's Right Hand, I'm Going to Rewrite the Script!
- Call of the Night
- Dai Dark
- Detective Conan: Police Academy Arc
- Do You Like the Nerdy Nurse?
- Don't XXX With Teachers!
- FIRE RABBIT!!
- Hanabi-chan Is Often Late
- Imouto Rireki
- Kaminaki Sekai no Kamisama Katsudō
- Kengan Omega
- MAO
- Mikazuki no Dragon
- Mysterious Disappearances
- No Longer Allowed In Another World
- Ponkotsu-chan Kenshōchū
- The Tale of the Outcasts
- Undine of the Desert World
- Vampeerz
- Yuko Sae Tatakaeba

== 2020s ==
=== 2020 ===
- 22/7 +α
- 365 Days to the Wedding
- Frieren: Beyond Journey's End
- Hei no Naka no Biyōshitsu
- I'm Not Meat
- Kanakana
- Kimi wa Meido-sama
- Kujō no Taizai
- Ladies on Top
- Minami Nanami Wants to Shine
- Minecraft: The Manga
- My One-Hit Kill Sister
- Orb: On the Movements of the Earth
- Phobia
- Rooster Fighter
- Ryū to Ichigo
- Saigo no Yūransen
- Trillion Game
- The Tunnel to Summer, the Exit of Goodbye: Ultramarine

=== 2021 ===
- Cat on the Hero's Lap
- Hirayasumi
- I Want to End This Love Game
- Kakeau Tsukihi
- Sexiled
- Shiroyama to Mita-san
- Yashahime: Princess Half-Demon
- Yasuke

== Unsorted ==
- The Doraemons' Special: Robot School Memories
- In the Bathroom
- Jitsuroku Adachi Mitsuru Monogatari
- Kimi no Tonari de Seishunchuu
- Kikaider
- SP: Security Police

== See also ==
- List of works published by Shogakukan
- List of manga published by Shueisha
- List of manga published by Hakusensha
