= Fantasista (manga) =

Japanese manga series

- First volume cover

ファンタジスタ (Fantajisuta)
- Genre: Sports
- Manga
- Written by: Michiteru Kusaba
- Published by: Shogakukan
- Imprint: Shōnen Sunday Comics
- Magazine: Weekly Shōnen Sunday
- Original run: July 28, 1999 – March 3, 2004
- Volumes: 25
- Manga

Fantasista Stella
- Written by: Michiteru Kusaba
- Published by: Shogakukan
- Imprint: Shōnen Sunday Comics
- Magazine: Weekly Shōnen Sunday
- Original run: October 10, 2012 – August 19, 2015
- Volumes: 14
- Original video animation

Fantasista Stella
- Directed by: Hideya Takahashi
- Written by: Tomohiro Yamashita
- Music by: Hiroki Urakari
- Studio: Xebec
- Released: December 8, 2015 – December 21, 2015
- Episodes: 3

Fantasista (Japanese: ファンタジスタ, Hepburn: Fantajisuta) is a Japanese manga series written and illustrated by Michiteru Kusaba. It was serialized in Shogakukan's Weekly Shōnen Sunday from July 1999 to March 2004. Its chapters were collected and published in twenty-five tankōbon volumes. A sequel manga, Fantasista Stella (Japanese: ファンタジスタステラ, Hepburn: Fantajisuta Sutera), was serialized in Weekly Shōnen Sunday from October 2012 to August 2015, which was collected into fourteen tankōbon volumes. A 3-episode anime OVA, produced by Xebec, was broadcast on Tokyo MX from December 8 to December 22, 2015. The episodes were released on DVD with volumes 8, 9, and 10 of the manga from September 2014 to February 2015.

== Story ==
The story follows Teppei Sakamoto, a country boy, who is a lover of soccer. His sister teaches him all about the game, then suggests he join the Mizumoto High School Soccer team to follow his dreams.

== Characters ==
Teppei Sakamoto (坂本轍平, Sakamoto Teppei)
Voiced by: Junichi Yanagita
Keisuke Honda (本田圭佑, Honda Keisuke)
Voiced by: Hideo Ishikawa
Atsushi Kondo (近藤敦, Kondō Atsushi)
Voiced by: Eiji Miyashita
Ryuji Morikawa (森川竜司, Morikawa Ryūji)
Voiced by: Kaito Ishikawa
Kaoru Okita (沖田薫, Okita Kaoru)
Voiced by: Kōki Uchiyama
Rui Okubo (大久保塁, Ōkubo Rui)
Voiced by: Shunsuke Kawabe

== Media ==
=== Manga ===
Fantasista is written and illustrated by Michiteru Kusaba. The series started in issue #35 of Shogakukan's Weekly Shōnen Sunday, where it ran from July 28, 1999, to March 3, 2004. The series was collected into twenty-five tankōbon volumes published by Shogakukan, released from January 18, 2000, to May 18, 2004 (which were reprinted from June 18, 2014, to May 18, 2015), and thirteen bunkoban volumes from November 15, 2008, to October 15, 2009. The sequel, Fantasista Stella, started in issue #45 of Weekly Shōnen Sunday, where it ran from October 10, 2012, to August 19, 2015. The series was collected into fourteen tankōbon volumes, released from January 18, 2013, to November 18, 2015.

==== Volume list ====
===== Fantasista =====
| No. | Japanese release date | Japanese ISBN |
|---|---|---|
| 1 | January 18, 2000 (original); June 18, 2014 (reprint) | 978-4-09-126001-7 (original); 978-4-09-124777-3 (reprint) |
| 2 | April 18, 2000 (original); June 18, 2014 (reprint) | 978-4-09-126002-4 (original); 978-4-09-124778-0 (reprint) |
| 3 | June 17, 2000 (original); June 18, 2014 (reprint) | 978-4-09-126003-1 (original); 978-4-09-124779-7 (reprint) |
| 4 | August 9, 2000 (original); July 18, 2014 (reprint) | 978-4-09-126004-8 (original); 978-4-09-124780-3 (reprint) |
| 5 | October 18, 2000 (original); July 18, 2014 (reprint) | 978-4-09-126005-5 (original); 978-4-09-124792-6 (reprint) |
| 6 | December 18, 2000 (original); August 18, 2014 (reprint) | 978-4-09-126006-2 (original); 978-4-09-124792-6 (reprint) |
| 7 | February 17, 2001 (original); August 18, 2014 (reprint) | 978-4-09-126007-9 (original); 978-4-09-124794-0 (reprint) |
| 8 | April 18, 2001 (original); September 18, 2014 (reprint) | 978-4-09-126008-6 (original); 978-4-09-124795-7 (reprint) |
| 9 | June 18, 2001 (original); September 18, 2014 (reprint) | 978-4-09-126009-3 (original); 978-4-09-124796-4 (reprint) |
| 10 | August 9, 2001 (original); October 17, 2014 (reprint) | 978-4-09-126010-9 (original); 978-4-09-124797-1 (reprint) |
| 11 | October 18, 2001 (original); October 17, 2014 (reprint) | 978-4-09-126291-2 (original); 978-4-09-124798-8 (reprint) |
| 12 | January 18, 2002 (original); November 18, 2014 (reprint) | 978-4-09-126292-9 (original); 978-4-09-124799-5 (reprint) |
| 13 | April 18, 2002 (original); November 18, 2014 (reprint) | 978-4-09-126293-6 (original); 978-4-09-124800-8 (reprint) |
| 14 | May 18, 2002 (original); December 18, 2014 (reprint) | 978-4-09-126294-3 (original); 978-4-09-124802-2 (reprint) |
| 15 | July 18, 2002 (original); December 18, 2014 (reprint) | 978-4-09-126295-0 (original); 978-4-09-124804-6 (reprint) |
| 16 | September 18, 2002 (original); January 16, 2015 (reprint) | 978-4-09-126296-7 (original); 978-4-09-124806-0 (reprint) |
| 17 | December 18, 2002 (original); January 16, 2015 (reprint) | 978-4-09-126297-4 (original); 978-4-09-124809-1 (reprint) |
| 18 | February 18, 2003 (original); February 18, 2015 (reprint) | 978-4-09-126298-1 (original); 978-4-09-124817-6 (reprint) |
| 19 | April 18, 2003 (original); February 18, 2015 (reprint) | 978-4-09-126299-8 (original); 978-4-09-124818-3 (reprint) |
| 20 | June 18, 2003 (original); March 18, 2015 (reprint) | 978-4-09-126300-1 (original); 978-4-09-124819-0 (reprint) |
| 21 | August 8, 2003 (original); March 18, 2015 (reprint) | 978-4-09-126671-2 (original); 978-4-09-124826-8 (reprint) |
| 22 | November 18, 2003 (original); April 17, 2015 (reprint) | 978-4-09-126672-9 (original); 978-4-09-124826-8 (reprint) |
| 23 | February 18, 2004 (original); April 17, 2015 (reprint) | 978-4-09-126673-6 (original); 978-4-09-124830-5 (reprint) |
| 24 | April 17, 2004 (original); May 18, 2015 (reprint) | 978-4-09-126674-3 (original); 978-4-09-125013-1 (reprint) |
| 25 | May 18, 2004 (original); May 18, 2015 (reprint) | 978-4-09-126675-0 (original); 978-4-09-125014-8 (reprint) |

===== Fantasista Stella =====
| No. | Japanese release date | Japanese ISBN |
|---|---|---|
| 1 | January 18, 2013 | 978-4-09-124179-5 |
| 2 | March 18, 2013 | 978-4-09-124277-8 |
| 3 | June 18, 2013 | 978-4-09-124312-6 |
| 4 | September 18, 2013 | 978-4-09-124378-2 |
| 5 | December 18, 2013 | 978-4-09-124509-0 |
| 6 | March 18, 2014 | 978-4-09-124577-9 |
| 7 | June 18, 2014 | 978-4-09-124664-6 |
| 8 | September 18, 2014 | 978-4-09-125103-9 |
| 9 | November 18, 2014 | 978-4-09-125367-5 |
| 10 | February 18, 2015 | 978-4-09-125580-8 |
| 11 | April 17, 2015 | 978-4-09-125820-5 |
| 12 | July 17, 2015 | 978-4-09-126193-9 |
| 13 | September 18, 2015 | 978-4-09-126289-9 |
| 14 | November 18, 2015 | 978-4-09-126485-5 |

=== Original video animation ===
A 3-episode OVA adaptation of Fantasista Stella, produced by Xebec and directed by Hideya Takahashi, was broadcast on Tokyo MX from December 8 to December 22, 2015, as part of Anime Sunday Theater. The episodes were released on DVD along with volumes 8, 9, and 10 of the manga from September 18, 2014, to February 18, 2015.

==== Episode list ====
| No. | Title | Original air date |
|---|---|---|
| 1 | "Teppei vs. Honda" (Japanese: 轍平 vs 本田) | December 8, 2015 |
| 2 | "The Mental Image to Win the World"; Transliteration: "Sekai ni Katsu Imēji" (Japanese: 世界に勝つイメージ) | December 15, 2015 |
| 3 | "The Stars Drawn on the Pitch"; Transliteration: "Pitchi ni Kaku Hoshi" (Japanese: ピッチに描く星) | December 22, 2015 |

== See also ==
- Daiku no Hatō — Another manga series by the same author.
