= Versailles of the Dead =

Japanese manga series

- Volume 1 cover, featuring Albert

ベルサイユオブザデッド (Berusaiyu obu za Deddo)
- Genre: Action; Dark fantasy; Historical
- Manga
- Written by: Kumiko Suekane
- Published by: Shogakukan
- English publisher: NA: Seven Seas Entertainment
- Imprint: Big Comics
- Magazine: Hibana (2016–17); MangaONE; Ura Sunday (2017–20)
- Original run: January 7, 2016 – November 7, 2020
- Volumes: 5
- icon

Versailles of the Dead (Japanese: ベルサイユオブザデッド, Hepburn: Berusaiyu obu za Deddo) is a Japanese manga series written and illustrated by Kumiko Suekane. It was serialized in Shogakukan's Hibana from 2016 to 2017, and in Ura Sunday website and MangaONE app from November 2017 to November 2020. Its chapters were collected in a total of five tankōbon volumes.

== Plot ==
While en route from Austria to marry Louis, Dauphin of France, the carriage of Archduchess Marie Antoinette is intercepted by bloodthirsty zombies. The sole survivor of the attack is Marie Antoinette's twin brother, Albert. He heads for Versailles in his sister's gown–and instead of continuing life as himself, decides to take his dead sister's place. Now at the heart of the French royal court, Albert must face the undead horrors as the man who someday would become Queen. However, members of the house are wondering if Albert is fit to rule, but more importantly, are suspecting he killed his own sister in jealousy.

== Characters ==
Albert (アルベルト, Arubāto)
He is the twin brother of Marie Antoinette. He lived his whole life under the control of his sister and due to his physical resemblance to her, he often acted as her double, something he deeply resented. He takes the place of Marie Antoinette after her death and becomes the Dauphine of France after marrying Louis-Auguste. It's later revealed that he is possessed by a demon.
Marie Antoinette (マリー・アントワネット, Marī Antowanetto)
Was the twin sister of Albert. Manipulative and carefree, she was promised in marriage to Louis, Dauphin of France as part of an alliance between France and Austria. She supposedly died after a zombie attack while on her way to France to get married, however, it's hinted that she was actually murdered by Albert.
Bastien (バスティアン, Basutian)
Member of the Royal Guard of the palace. He is assigned as Albert's personal bodyguard, whom he distrusts due to the mysterious circumstances surrounding the death of Marie Antoinette. After being killed by Albert, he comes back to life and becomes his puppet.
Louis-Auguste (ルイ・オーギュスト, Rui Ōgyusuto)
Dauphin of France and Louis XV's grandson. He agrees to marry Albert following his grandfather's wishes. He does not blames Albert for the current situation, since according to him, he is also a victim.
Louis XV (ルイ15世, Rui 15-sei)
The current King of France and Louis-Auguste's grandfather. After learning about Marie Antoinette's death, he decides not to make it public and marry his grandson to Albert, since the death of a princess upon arriving to France would bring a disrepute reputation to the kingdom.
Madame du Barry (デュ・バリー夫人, Deyu Barī-fujin)
The favorite mistress of Louis XV. She is jealous of Marie Antoinette and ordered Angelo and Dominic to kill her, however, they failed in both occasions.
Gerard (ジェラール, Jerāru)
Member of the Royal Guard of the palace and Bastien's friend.
Angelo (アンジェロ, Anjero)
Dominic (ドミニク, Dominiku)
Adélaide (アデライード, Aderaīdo)
Daughter of Louis XV and Louis-Auguste's aunt. Together with her sisters, she is one of the few people who knows the true identity of the Dauphine.
Victoire (ヴィクトワ, Vuikutowa)
Daughter of Louis XV and Louis-Auguste's aunt. Together with her sisters, she is one of the few people who knows the true identity of the Dauphine.
Sophie (ソフィー, Sofī)
Daughter of Louis XV and Louis-Auguste's aunt. Together with her sisters, she is one of the few people who knows the true identity of the Dauphine.

== Publication ==
Versailles of the Dead is written and illustrated by Kumiko Suekane. The series started its serialization in Shogakukan's Hibana on January 7, 2016. After Hibana ceased its publication on August 7, 2017, the series was moved to Shogakukan's Ura Sunday and MangaONE app, starting on November 7, 2017. The manga went on hiatus from September 2018 to September 2019. The series finished on November 7, 2020. (Note: Anime News Network incorrectly listed the penultimate chapter as the series last chapter. The last chapter was published on MangaONE on November 7, 2020, and a week later on Ura Sunday on November 14.) Shogakukan collected its chapters into five individual tankōbon volumes, released from January 12, 2017, to December 11, 2020.

The manga has been licensed for English language release in North America by Seven Seas Entertainment. The manga is also licensed in France by Kana.

=== Volumes ===
No.	Original release date	Original ISBN	English release date	English ISBN
1	January 12, 2017	978-4-09-187666-9	October 30, 2018	978-1-626929-34-0
2	January 12, 2018	978-4-09-189829-6	March 19, 2019	978-1-642750-16-4
3	December 12, 2019	978-4-09-860523-1	February 28, 2023	978-1-63858-623-4
4	April 17, 2020	978-4-09-860655-9	July 4, 2023	978-1-63858-755-2
5	December 11, 2020	978-4-09-860832-4	October 17, 2023	978-1-63858-928-0
