= Ginrō Blood Bone =

Japanese manga series

- First volume cover

銀狼ブラッドボーン (Ginrō Buraddo Bōn)
- Genre: Dark fantasy
- Manga
- Written by: Tatsukazu Konda
- Illustrated by: Shimeji Yukiyama
- Published by: Shogakukan
- Imprint: Ura Sunday Comics
- Magazine: Ura Sunday; MangaOne
- Original run: April 29, 2015 – November 6, 2021
- Volumes: 16
- icon

Ginrō Blood Bone (Note: Japanese: 銀狼ブラッドボーン, Hepburn: Ginrō Buraddo Bōn; "Silver Wolf, Blood, Bone") is a Japanese manga series written by Tatsukazu Konda and illustrated by Shimeji Yukiyama. It was serialized in Shogakukan's online platform Ura Sunday from April 2015 to November 2021.

== Publication ==
Ginrō Blood Bone, written by Tatsukazu Konda and illustrated by Shimeji Yukiyama, was serialized on Shogakukan's online platform Ura Sunday from April 29, 2015, to November 6, 2021. Shogakukan collected its chapters in sixteen tankōbon volumes, released from August 12, 2015, to December 17, 2021.

=== Volumes ===
| No. | Japanese release date | Japanese ISBN |
|---|---|---|
| 1 | August 12, 2015 | 978-4-09-126327-8 |
| 2 | December 11, 2015 | 978-4-09-126679-8 |
| 3 | May 18, 2016 | 978-4-09-127264-5 |
| 4 | October 19, 2016 | 978-4-09-127397-0 |
| 5 | April 19, 2017 | 978-4-09-127591-2 |
| 6 | September 12, 2017 | 978-4-09-127778-7 |
| 7 | January 19, 2018 | 978-4-09-128144-9 |
| 8 | June 19, 2018 | 978-4-09-128310-8 |
| 9 | November 19, 2018 | 978-4-09-128721-2 |
| 10 | May 10, 2019 | 978-4-09-129198-1 |
| 11 | October 11, 2019 | 978-4-09-129418-0 |
| 12 | May 12, 2020 | 978-4-09-850114-4 |
| 13 | November 12, 2020 | 978-4-09-850328-5 |
| 14 | May 12, 2021 | 978-4-09-850569-2 |
| 15 | October 12, 2021 | 978-4-09-850749-8 |
| 16 | December 17, 2021 | 978-4-09-850838-9 |
