= Heaven's Will (manga) =

Japanese manga series

- The cover of Heaven's Will

ヘブンズウィル (Hebunzu Uiru)
- Genre: Supernatural
- Manga
- Written by: Satoru Takamiya
- Published by: Shogakukan
- English publisher: Viz Media
- Magazine: ChuChu
- Original run: January 2006 – April 2006
- Volumes: 1

Heaven's Will (ヘブンズウィル, Hebunzu Uiru) is a shōjo manga series written by Satoru Takamiya. The manga was serialized in Japan in the manga magazine ChuChu from January 2006 to April 2006.

Heaven's Will is published in English by VIZ Media.

== Plot ==
Mikuzu Sudou has the ability to see spirits known as "Oni". Due to her predisposition, she has become a magnet for all sorts of unwelcome monsters. After meeting Seto Ashiya, a young cross-dressing exorcist, he begins protecting Mikuzu from Oni to practice his exorcism skills. In return, Mikuzu promises to bake a cake every time Seto protects her.

== Characters ==
These are the three main characters of Heaven's Will.

Mikuzu Sudou (須藤 美葛, Sudō Mikuzu)
Mikuzu Sudou is a young girl with the power to see ghosts and spirits known as "Oni". She is very afraid of both these spirits and of men. When she meets Seto, he promises to protect her from the spirits for a large fee. Mikuzu, being very poor, compromises with Seto and instead bakes him a cake every day instead. Seto refers to her as a "Kenki", one who can see oni. Mikuzu is also the only one who meets Seto's younger sister, "Seto", which results in Seto possibly starting to hate her. She has a terrible impression of Kagari and once treated him like a dog. She does whatever she can to make sure Seto doesn't get money to keep him from getting a sex change and giving his body to his little sister.
"Seto Ashiya"? (芦屋 世登, Ashiya Seto)
Seto Ashiya (whose real name is unknown) is a cross dressing, cake loving exorcist boy. He protects Mikuzu from Oni by exorcising them with his fan. It is revealed that Seto had a little twin sister who died years ago while protecting him from an Oni. It is also revealed that "Seto" is not his real name, but in reality his little sister's. His goal is to get enough money to get a sex change so that he can bring his sister's soul out of the fan and into his body, killing him, much to Mikuzu's dismay. Seto helps Mikuzu get over her fear of men little by little as he is a boy who looks like a girl. His companion is a vampire who can turn into a wolf, named Kagari. He has a very bright personality and loves food.
Kagari (篝)
Kagari is a handsome vampire who can turn into a black wolf. He is taken care of by his companion Seto Ashiya, who gives Kagari his blood to eat. Kagari refused to live with humans because they die first, until he met Seto, who promised that before he died, he would exorcize him. Kagari disapproves of Seto's plan to give his body to Seto's little sister, but doesn't object to it. He can play the piano but doesn't say who it was that taught him, claiming "he's dead now." He acts cold towards Mikuzu, only showing her a true smile at the end of the book. He claims that even though he doesn't like Mikuzu, he doesn't mind being around her. He only allows Seto to treat him like a dog and use him as he wills.
