= Be Blues! =

Japanese manga series by Motoyuki Tanaka

- Be Blues! – Ao ni Nare
- First tankōbon volume cover, featuring Ryū Ichijō

BE BLUES!〜青になれ〜 (Bī Burūzu! Ao ni Nare)
- Genre: Sports
- Manga
- Written by: Motoyuki Tanaka
- Published by: Shogakukan
- Imprint: Shōnen Sunday Comics
- Magazine: Weekly Shōnen Sunday
- Original run: January 26, 2011 – October 12, 2022
- Volumes: 49
- icon

Be Blues! – Ao ni Nare (Japanese: BE BLUES!〜青になれ〜, Hepburn: Bī Burūzu! Ao ni Nare) is a Japanese association football manga series written and illustrated by Motoyuki Tanaka. It was serialized in Shogakukan's shōnen manga magazine Weekly Shōnen Sunday from January 2011 to October 2022, with its chapters collected into 49 tankōbon volumes.

In 2015, Be Blues! won the 60th Shogakukan Manga Award in the shōnen category.

== Plot ==
Ryū Ichijō is a prodigy football player who dreams of becoming a professional player and member of the Japan national team (the "Blues" of the title) by the age of 18. He excels as he proceeds through his schooling, but just as he prepares to start his junior high school he suffers a fall leading to really serious injuries, and has to go through a long period of rehabilitation. Two years after his accident, he is able to play again and starts working to get his skills up again, and to improve so as to achieve his dreams of making it to the national team.

== Characters ==
Ryū Ichijō (一条 龍, Ichijō Ryū)
Yūto Oume (青梅 優人, Oume Yūto)
Tatsuhiko Kuze (久世 立彦, Kuze Tatsuhiko)
Takumi Sakuraba (桜庭 巧美, Sakuraba Takumi)

== Publication ==
Written and illustrated by Motoyuki Tanaka, Be Blues! – Ao ni Nare was serialized in Shogakukan's shōnen manga magazine Weekly Shōnen Sunday from January 26, 2011, to October 12, 2022. Shogakukan collected its chapters in 49 tankōbon volumes, released from June 17, 2011, to November 18, 2022.

=== Volumes ===
No.	Release date	ISBN
1	June 17, 2011	978-4-09-123005-8
2	September 16, 2011	978-4-09-123248-9
3	November 18, 2011	978-4-09-123370-7
4	February 17, 2012	978-4-09-123545-9
5	May 18, 2012	978-4-09-123658-6
6	July 18, 2012	978-4-09-123773-6
7	October 18, 2012	978-4-09-123895-5
8	December 18, 2012	978-4-09-123895-5
9	March 18, 2013	978-4-09-124199-3
10	June 18, 2013	978-4-09-124317-1
11	September 18, 2013	978-4-09-124380-5
12	November 18, 2013	978-4-09-124492-5
13	February 18, 2014	978-4-09-124560-1
14	May 16, 2014	978-4-09-124641-7
15	June 18, 2014	978-4-09-124739-1
16	September 18, 2014	978-4-09-125100-8
17	December 18, 2014	978-4-09-125395-8
18	March 18, 2015	978-4-09-125630-0
19	May 18, 2015	978-4-09-125834-2
20	August 18, 2015	978-4-09-126205-9
21	November 18, 2015	978-4-09-126491-6
22	February 18, 2016	978-4-09-126779-5
23	May 18, 2016	978-4-09-127138-9
24	August 18, 2016	978-4-09-127327-7
25	November 18, 2016	978-4-09-127416-8
26	February 17, 2017	978-4-09-127500-4
27	May 18, 2017	978-4-09-127569-1
28	August 18, 2017	978-4-09-127678-0
29	November 17, 2017	978-4-09-127869-2
30	February 16, 2018	978-4-09-128084-8
31	May 18, 2018	978-4-09-128248-4
32	August 17, 2018	978-4-09-128350-4
33	November 16, 2018	978-4-09-128576-8
34	February 18, 2019	978-4-09-128878-3
35	May 17, 2019	978-4-09-129150-9
36	August 16, 2019	978-4-09-129319-0
37	November 18, 2019	978-4-09-129444-9
38	February 18, 2020	978-4-09-129559-0
39	May 18, 2020	978-4-09-850076-5
40	July 17, 2020	978-4-09-128084-8
41	September 18, 2020	978-4-09-850175-5
42	January 18, 2021	978-4-09-850381-0
43	April 16, 2021	978-4-09-850516-6
44	July 16, 2021	978-4-09-850632-3
45	October 18, 2021	978-4-09-850721-4
46	January 18, 2022	978-4-09-850862-4
47	April 18, 2022	978-4-09-851060-3
48	August 18, 2022	978-4-09-851186-0
49	November 18, 2022	978-4-09-851391-8

== Reception ==
Be Blues! won the 60th Shogakukan Manga Award in the shōnen category in 2015.

== See also ==
- Saikyō! Toritsu Aoizaka Kōkō Yakyūbu, another manga series by the same author
