= Shut Hell =

Japanese manga series

- First tankōbon volume cover

シュトヘル (Shuto Heru)
- Genre: Historical
- Manga
- Written by: Yu Itō
- Published by: Shogakukan
- Magazine: Weekly Big Comic Spirits (2008–10); Monthly Big Comic Spirits (2010–17)
- Original run: December 22, 2008 – March 27, 2017
- Volumes: 14
- icon

Shut Hell (Japanese: シュトヘル, Hepburn: Shuto Heru) is a Japanese manga series written and illustrated by Yu Itō. It was serialized in Shogakukan's seinen manga magazines Weekly Big Comic Spirits (2008–2010) and Monthly Big Comic Spirits (2010–2017), with its chapters collected in 14 tankōbon volumes. Shut Hell earned Itō the New Artist Prize at the 16th Tezuka Osamu Cultural Prize in 2012.

== Plot ==
Sudou, a young man who is plagued with recurring vivid dreams of bloody ancient battles, is approached by Suzuki, a shy and quiet girl. When Suzuki visits Sudou's apartment, she plays an instrument he made, which transports Sudou to the year 1209. He awakes to find that he is now a woman nicknamed Shut Hell: Evil Spirit (シュトヘル 悪霊, Shuto Heru Akuryō) and Suzuki a Mongol prince named Yurul. The story takes place in the early 13th century; Genghis Khan has united the Mongolian clans and is strengthening his forces to end the Western Xia dynasty. The plot follows a Xia soldier, sole survivor of a unit massacred by forces led by Mongol general Harabal. Now driven by vengeance, she is feared by the Mongols as "the Evil One" or Shut Hell in Mongolian for her merciless killing. She accompanies Yurul as he flees his Mongol family to preserve a vital collections of writings, knowing that Harabal will follow them, giving her a chance to kill him.

== Publication ==
Written and illustrated by Yu Itō, Shut Hell started in Shogakukan's seinen manga magazine Weekly Big Comic Spirits on December 22, 2008. The series was later transferred to Monthly Big Comic Spirits, where it ran from July 27, 2010, to March 27, 2017. Shogakukan collected its chapters in 14 tankōbon volumes, released from March 30, 2009, to May 12, 2017.

=== Volumes ===
No.	Japanese release date	Japanese ISBN
1	March 30, 2009	978-4-09-182529-2
2	October 30, 2009	978-4-09-182799-9
3	July 30, 2010	978-4-09-183420-1
4	April 28, 2011	978-4-09-183866-7
5	October 28, 2011	978-4-09-184212-1
6	May 30, 2012	978-4-09-184550-4
7	December 27, 2012	978-4-09-184830-7
8	July 30, 2013	978-4-09-185447-6
9	February 28, 2014	978-4-09-186119-1
10	September 30, 2014	978-4-09-186499-4
11	June 12, 2015	978-4-09-187105-3
12	January 12, 2016	978-4-09-187415-3
13	September 12, 2016	978-4-09-187830-4
14	May 12, 2017	978-4-09-189574-5

== Reception ==
Shut Hell earned Yu Itō the New Artist Prize at the 16th Tezuka Osamu Cultural Prize in 2012.
