= Boy's Life (Japanese magazine) =

Japanese boys' magazine

- August 1969 cover
- Categories: Shōnen manga
- Frequency: Monthly
- First issue: April 1, 1963
- Final issue: August 1, 1969
- Company: Shogakukan
- Country: Japan
- Based in: Tokyo
- Language: Japanese

Boys' Life (Japanese: ボーイズライフ, Hepburn: Bōizu Raifu) was a Japanese monthly shōnen magazine published by Shogakukan from April 1963 until August 1969. The magazine was marketed to boys in junior high school and older, and included a manga section as well as general interest articles and information.

== Outline ==
Boys' Life was launched on April 1, 1963, to take the place of Chūgakusei no Tomo. The first editor of the magazine, Yūnosuke Onishi, went on to be editor of Big Comic and many other magazines.

The magazine included several regular features, including a life counseling column, novel reviews, discussions of popular culture topics such as aliens, androids, cryptids, the Hollow Earth hypothesis, and the Vietnam War. The editors of the magazine often travelled abroad to gather information and photographs for stories on adventures (such as cave exploration) and unexplored regions of the world as well as the indigenous peoples inhabiting them.

Boy's Life also published a number of well-known artists, including Sanpei Shirato, creator of The Legend of Kamui.

In 1967, Shogakukan wanted Shirato's The Legend of Kamui. They planned to purchase Garo, the magazine in which it was serialized, then merge it with Boy's Life into a new magazine. However, this idea was never realized because Katsuichi Nagai, the editor of Garo, declined the offer. Shogakukan pursued another angle on the idea, however, and launched Big Comic in April 1968. They published "Stray Dog" (野犬, Yaken), the sixth chapter of Shirato's Sanpei Gekijō (三平劇場), in full color after the first five had originally appeared in Boy's Life.

The last issue of Boy's Life was the August 1, 1969, issue, and the magazine was replaced by the Weekly Post, also published by Shogakukan.

== Works which appeared in the magazine ==
Listed alphabetically by year(s) of appearance.

- Chōjintachi (Shotaro Ishinomori, November–December 1963)
- Holiday Run (バカンス航路) (Katsumi Kasuko, August 1963)
- Sanpei Gekijō (Sanpei Shirato, April–August 1963)
- Yumei ga Ippai Vacation (Katsumi Kasuko, June 1963)
- Yōki na Nakama (Katsumi Kasuko, September 1963-March 1964)
- Katame Saru (Mitsuteru Yokoyama, September 1963-March 1965)
- Kogarashi Ippei (Osamu Kishimoto, April–November 1964)
- Sebangō 0 (Hirō Terada, April–November 1964)
- Funky Boys (Katsumi Kasuko, August 1964-March 1965)
- 007 (Takao Saito, December 1964-August 1967)
- 1 no 1 no 1 (Kenji Morita, April–July 1965)
- Ijiwaru Kyōju (Fujio Akatsuka, July–December 1965)
- Kōryō (Mitsuteru Yokoyama, April 1965-February 1966)
- Akanbe Akanbo (Jirō Tsunoda, March 1966)
- Obake no Q-tarō (Fujiko Fujio, March 1966)
- Oba-Q no Otoboke Gihyō (Fujiko Fujio, April–December 1966)
- Osomatsu-kun (Fujio Akatsuka, April–December 1966)
- Thriller Kyōju (Fujio Akatsuka, January–March 1966, April 1967, August 1967)
- Mizuki Shigeru Yōkai Gekijō (Shigeru Mizuki, September 1967)
- Shirato Sanpei Gekijō (Sanpei Shirato, January–August 1967)
- Tama no Uta (Kazuhiko Miyaya, December 1967)
- Z to Yobareru Otoko (Masaaki Satō, September 1967-September 1968)
- Chōsen Yarō (Takao Saito, September 1967-January 1969)
- Unabara no Ken (Goseki Kojima, May–August 1968)
- Phoenix Jyo (Kazuhiko Miyaya, October 1968)
- Zubeko Tantei Ran (Tōru Shinohara, October 1968-August 1969)
- Matt Helm series (Jin Kimura, created by Donald Hamilton, November 1968-March 1969)
- Uragiri no Gunpoint (Ken Tsukikage, February 1969)
- Karasu (Takao Saito, March–August 1969)
- Gunman / Fukushū no Mugonka series (Ken Tsukikage, April–July 1969)
