= Ladies on Top =

Japanese manga series

- First tankōbon volume cover, featuring Takayuki Shinomiya (left) and Mitsuki Kajitani (right)

女の子が抱いちゃダメですか？ (Onnanoko ga Daicha Dame desu ka?)
- Genre: Romantic comedy; Sex comedy
- Manga
- Written by: Nejiganameta
- Published by: Shogakukan
- English publisher: NA: Seven Seas Entertainment
- Imprint: Ura Sunday Comics
- Magazine: MangaONE; Ura Sunday
- Original run: May 21, 2020 – April 28, 2022
- Volumes: 6
- Television drama
- Directed by: Yuri Yagihashi
- Written by: Miki Matsugasako; Haruna Takekawa
- Studio: K2 Pictures
- Original network: MBS
- Original run: March 6, 2026 – April 24, 2026
- Episodes: 8
- icon

Ladies on Top (Japanese: 女の子が抱いちゃダメですか？, Hepburn: Onnanoko ga Daicha Dame desu ka?; 'Is It Okay for a Girl to Hug Me?') is a Japanese web manga series written and illustrated by Nejiganameta. It was serialized on Shogakukan's online platforms MangaONE and Ura Sunday from May 2020 to April 2022, with its chapters collected in six tankōbon volumes. A live-action television drama adaptation aired from March to April 2026.

== Plot ==
Mitsuki Kajitani is a 24-year-old office lady who yearns for love. However, when men show her affection, she becomes cold and distant. One night, she discovers that her current boyfriend, Takayuki Shinomiya, likes aggressive women, which awakens a new side to her. As such, Kajitani and Shinomiya are determined to have a relationship where the traditional gender roles are reversed.

== Characters ==
Mitsuki Kajitani (梶谷美月, Kajitani Mitsuki)
Portrayed by: Kohaku Shida
Takayuki Shinomiya (篠宮孝之, Shinomiya Takayuki)
Portrayed by: Hayato Takao

== Media ==
=== Manga ===
Written and illustrated by Nejiganameta, Ladies on Top was serialized on Shogakukan's online platform MangaONE, under its Manga One Girls' Club (マンガワン女子部, Manga Wan Joshi-bu) label, from May 21, 2020, to April 28, 2022. it was also published on Ura Sunday starting on May 28, 2020. Shogakukan collected its chapters in six tankōbon volumes, released from September 11, 2020, to August 19, 2022.

In January 2022, Seven Seas Entertainment announced that they had licensed the series and that it would be released under their new imprint, Steamship, for series that would be considered "sexy romance for women." The first volume was released on September 13, 2022.

==== Volumes ====
No.	Original release date	Original ISBN	English release date	English ISBN
1	September 11, 2020	978-4-09-850240-0	September 13, 2022	978-1-63858-680-7
1. "The First Night" (初夜, Shoya); 2. "Kiss" (キス, Kisu); 3. "Staying the Night ①" (お泊まり①, O tomari ①); 4. "Staying the Night ②" (お泊まり②, O tomari ②); 5. "Staying the Night ③" (お泊まり③, O tomari ③); 6. "Out for a Drive" (ドライプ, Doraipu); Extra (おまけ, Omake)
2	January 19, 2021	978-4-09-850439-8	March 7, 2023	978-1-63858-876-4
7. "Massage" (マッサージ, Massāji); 8. "Reunion" (再会, Saikai); 9. "Confession" (告白, Kokuhaku); 10. "Tears" (涙, Namida); 11. "Punishment ①" (お仕置き①, Oshioki ①); 12. "Punishment ②" (お仕置き②, Oshioki ②); 13. "Taking the Challenge" (挑戦, Chōsen); Extra (おまけ, Omake)
3	May 12, 2021	978-4-09-850574-6	May 30, 2023	978-1-68579-594-8
14. "Newbie" (新入り, Shin'iri); 15. "Warning" (忠告, Chūkoku); 16. "Preparations" (準備, Junbi); 17. "The Real Thing" (本番, Honban); 18. "New Territory" (未知, Michi); 19. "One Concern" (手段の一つ, Shudan no hitotsu); 20. "About Us" (二人の話, Futari no hanashi); Extra (おまけ, Omake)
4	October 18, 2021	978-4-09-850758-0	September 12, 2023	978-1-68579-852-9
21. "Declaration" (宣言, Sengen); 22. "Company Trip 1" (社員旅行①, Shain ryokō ①); 23. "Company Trip 2" (社員旅行②, Shain ryokō ②); 24. "Company Trip 3" (社員旅行③, Shain ryokō ③); 25. "Bath Time" (お風呂, O furo); 26. "Finally!" (ついにゃ, Tsui nya); 27. "Finally, Finally!!" (ついについに, Tsuini tsuini); 28. "Fate" (運命, Unmei)
5	March 10, 2022	978-4-09-851026-9	January 16, 2024	979-8-88843-116-0
29. "Cosplay" (衣裝, Koromo shou); 30. "Visitor" (訪問者, Hōmonsha); 31. "Introductions" (ご挨拶, Go aisatsu); 32. "Younger Brother" (零, Rei); 33. "Troubles" (悩み, Nayami); 34. "To Face Your Fears" (向き合うこと, Mukiau koto); 35. "Three Hours" (3時間, Sanjikan); 36. "Just Two More Hours" (あと2時間, Ato nijikan)
6	August 19, 2022	978-4-09-851241-6	May 14, 2024	979-8-88843-474-1
37. "Something Even Better" (もっともっとすごいこと, Motto motto sugoi koto); 38. "Our New Life" (新生活, Shin seikatsu); 39. "Living Together" (共同生活, Kyōdō seikatsu); 40. "Fever" (熱, Netsu); 41. "Idiot" (ばか, Baka); 42. "Night Before" (前夜, Zen'ya); 43. "Together" (ふたりで, Futari de)

=== Drama ===
A Japanese television drama adaptation was announced on February 9, 2026. It was directed by Yuri Yagihashi, with scripts written by Miki Matsugasako and Haruna Takekawa. It aired on MBS's "Dramaphil" programming block from March 6 to April 24, 2026.

== Reception ==
Anime News Network reviewer Rebecca Silverman and Anime Feminist writer Alex Henderson both praised the series for its romance as well as its approach to heterosexual gender roles.
