= B.B. Explosion =

Japanese manga series

- Cover of B.B. Explosion first tankōbon as published by Shogakukan

はじけてB.B. (Hajikete B.B.)
- Genre: Romance
- Manga
- Written by: Yasue Imai
- Published by: Shogakukan
- English publisher: NA: Viz Media
- Magazine: Ciao
- Original run: June 1997 – January 1999
- Volumes: 5

B.B. Explosion (Japanese: はじけてB.B., Hepburn: Hajikete B.B.) is a manga by Yasue Imai. It was licensed in the United States by VIZ Media. The manga revolves around little Airi from Okinawa who enters the Actors school dreaming of appearing in the TV series called Boom Boom, hence the B.B. in the title.

== Plot ==
Airi Ishikawa is a young girl from Okinawa who hopes to pursue a career in the entertainment industry. She enrolls at a performing arts school in a larger city with the aim of appearing on Boom Boom, a weekly television variety show featuring emerging performers. At the school, Airi develops her interest in singing and encounters other students with similar career aspirations.

== Characters ==
- Airi Ishikawa is a lively and sweet Grade 6 schoolgirl who dreams of meeting her idol Issa from the boyband Da Pump. She initially enrolled in Actors to pursue this dream, but soon discovers her intense passion for singing and the impact she can have upon others.
- Yū Yamada is a girl who also dreams of becoming a brilliant singer and dancer, but she is also thinking about becoming a model. Yū tends to act overly excited and refers to herself in the third person.
- Yumi Kōchi is a girl who is older than Airi and Yū. For her audition for Actors, she performed a duet with her best friend, but only Yumi was admitted. Yumi is more serious and also has the tendency to get hungry easily.
- Da Pump is boyband whose members graduated from Actors as soon as Airi was admitted. The group features includes the popular Issa, who was Airi's inspiration for attending the school.
