= Kakeau Tsukihi =

Japanese manga series

- First tankōbon volume cover

かけあうつきひ
- Genre: Comedy, slice of life
- Manga
- Written by: Sei Fukui
- Published by: Shogakukan
- Imprint: Shōnen Sunday Comics
- Magazine: Weekly Shōnen Sunday
- Original run: May 12, 2021 – July 6, 2022
- Volumes: 6

Kakeau Tsukihi (かけあうつきひ) is a Japanese manga series written and illustrated by Sei Fukui. It was serialized in Shogakukan's shōnen manga magazine Weekly Shōnen Sunday from May 2021 to July 2022, with its chapters collected in six tankōbon volumes.

== Publication ==
Written and illustrated by Sei Fukui, Kakeau Tsukihi was serialized in Shogakukan's shōnen manga magazine Weekly Shōnen Sunday from May 12, 2021, to July 6, 2022. Shogakukan collected its chapters in six tankōbon volumes, released from August 18, 2021, to August 18, 2022.

=== Volumes ===
No.	Japanese release date	Japanese ISBN
1	August 18, 2021	978-4-09-850639-2
2	November 18, 2021	978-4-09-850724-5
3	January 18, 2022	978-4-09-850864-8
4	April 18, 2022	978-4-09-851059-7
5	June 17, 2022	978-4-09-851153-2
6	August 18, 2022	978-4-09-851225-6

== Reception ==
The series ranked fifth on the Publisher Comics' Recommended Comics of 2022.
