= Pokémon Pocket Monsters =

Manga in the Pokémon franchise, written by Kosaku Anakubo

- Volume 1 cover

ポケットモンスター (Pokettomonsutā)
- Manga
- Written by: Kosaku Anakubo
- Published by: Shogakukan
- English publisher: SG: Chuang Yi
- Magazine: CoroCoro Comic
- Original run: November 1996 – April 2003
- Volumes: 14
- Manga

Pocket Monsters Ruby-Sapphire
- Written by: Kosaku Anakubo
- Published by: Shogakukan
- English publisher: SG: Chuang Yi
- Magazine: CoroCoro Comic
- Original run: September 2003 – May 2006
- Volumes: 6
- Manga

Pocket Monsters Diamond-Pearl
- Written by: Kosaku Anakubo
- Published by: Shogakukan
- Magazine: CoroCoro Comic
- Original run: June 2006 – October 2008
- Volumes: 5
- Manga

Pocket Monsters HGSS
- Written by: Kosaku Anakubo
- Published by: Shogakukan
- Magazine: CoroCoro Comic
- Original run: June 2010 – January 2011
- Volumes: 2
- Manga

Pocket Monsters BW
- Written by: Kosaku Anakubo
- Published by: Shogakukan
- Magazine: CoroCoro Comic
- Original run: August 2011 – August 2013
- Volumes: 4
- Manga

Pocket Monsters XY
- Written by: Kosaku Anakubo
- Published by: Shogakukan
- Magazine: CoroCoro Comic
- Original run: April 2014 – October 2016
- Volumes: 5
- Manga

Pocket Monsters Sun and Moon
- Written by: Kosaku Anakubo
- Published by: Shogakukan
- Magazine: CoroCoro Comic
- Original run: 2017 – 2020
- Volumes: 4
- Manga

Pocket Monsters Aniki
- Written by: Kosaku Anakubo
- Published by: Shogakukan
- Magazine: CoroCoro Aniki
- Original run: 2021 – present
- Volumes: 1

Pokémon Pocket Monsters, known in Japan as simply Pocket Monsters (ポケットモンスター, Pokettomonsutā), is one of the first Pokémon manga to come out in Japan and ran for 13 volumes. In Singapore, it was published by Chuang Yi in English in 2005 and retitled Pokémon Pocket Monsters. The first series is set in Kanto and Johto, while the new series were based on Hoenn, Sinnoh, Unova, Kalos and Alola. The manga is written Kosaku Anakubo.

On October 11, 2019, it was announced that Pocket Monsters manga ended its regular publication in Bessatsu CoroCoro after 23 years, being replaced by Machito Gomi's manga adaptation of the then-current series of the Pokémon television series. However, Kosaku Anakubo continues to write and illustrate new, shorter chapters, first for the quarterly CoroCoro Aniki (discontinued in early 2021) and CoroCoro Online under the moniker Pocket Monsters Aniki.

== Plot ==
The manga follows Red, a young boy competing with a rival, Green, to complete the Pokédex and become the master of Pokémon. In this manga, Pokémon are capable of human speech. It is thought that a Clefairy is the main character, albeit just a follower of Red. It is obnoxious but lovable, whose big mouth sometimes gets it into trouble. Surprisingly enough, it comes up with clever ideas to help Red and Pikachu.

In the first few manga books, Red's team consists of Pikachu and Clefairy only. However, later on, Red gains a valuable companion in Tyrogue as well. Pikachu himself cannot talk.

The story also goes to the Johto region, where Red gets introduced to trainers Gold and Silver, supposedly based on the video game characters. It goes to Hoenn in the last volume, where Red thinks of receiving a Torchic and abandoning Clefairy. The manga continues under the name of Pokémon Ruby-Sapphire, starting the volume number from 1.

=== Characters ===
- Red (レッド, Reddo) (Isamu Akai (赤井 勇, Akai Isamu)): Charged with completing the Pokémon Zukan, he is Green's rival.
- Clefairy (Pippi in the Japanese version): Red's first Pokémon ally. It is very vulgar and likes to do 'sick' things to attract attention.
- Pikachu: Clefairy's younger cousin who joins Red and Clefairy. He is unable to talk.
- Green (グリーン, Gurīn) (Kai Midorikawa (緑川 開, Midorikawa Kai)): Red's rival.

== Sequels ==
=== Pocket Monsters Ruby-Sapphire ===
Pocket Monsters Ruby-Sapphire (ポケットモンスタールビー・サファイア, Poketto Monsutā Rubī-Safaia) is the first sequel, and is set in Hoenn. The first volume was released September 25, 2003, and the last was released May 26, 2006. It was released in Singapore by Chuang Yi as Pokémon Pocket Monsters Ruby-Sapphire.

=== Pocket Monsters Diamond-Pearl ===
Pocket Monsters Diamond-Pearl (ポケットモンスターダイヤモンド・パール, Poketto Monsutā Daiyamondo-Pāru) is the second sequel, and is set in Sinnoh. The first volume was released January 26, 2007, and the last was released October 28, 2009.

=== Pocket Monsters HGSS ===
Pocket Monsters HGSS (ポケットモンスター HG・SS) is the third sequel, and is set in Johto. The first volume was released on June 28, 2010, and the second and last was released on January 28, 2011. It was released in Singapore as Pokémon Pocket Monsters HGSS.

=== Pocket Monsters Black-White ===
Pocket Monsters BW (ポケットモンスターブラック・ホワイト) is the fourth sequel, and is set in Unova. It was first released March 6, 2011, and the last volume was released August 28, 2013.

=== Pocket Monsters XY ===
Pocket Monsters XY (ポケットモンスターエックス・ワイ, Poketto Monsutā Ekkusu Wai) is the fifth sequel, and is set in Kalos. It was first released on April 28, 2014, and the last volume was released on October 28, 2016.

=== Pocket Monsters Sun and Moon ===
Pocket Monsters Sun and Moon (ポケットモンスター サン・ムーン編, Poketto Monsutā San Mūn-ben) is the sixth sequel, and is in Alola. It was first released on November 28, 2017.

=== Pocket Monsters Sword and Shield ===
Pocket Monsters Big Bro (ポケットモンスターアニキ編, Poketto Monsutā Aniki-hen) is the seventh sequel. It was first released on June 11, 2021, and includes the special Pocket Monsters Sword and Shield (ソード・シールド編, Sōdo Shīrudo-hen).
