= Yōkai Giga =

Japanese manga series

- First tankōbon volume cover

妖怪ギガ
- Genre: Supernatural
- Manga
- Written by: Satsuki Satō
- Published by: Shogakukan
- Imprint: Shōnen Sunday Comics Special
- Magazine: Weekly Shōnen Sunday
- Original run: April 26, 2017 – November 24, 2021
- Volumes: 11

Yōkai Giga (妖怪ギガ) (Note: Yōkai Giga can be translated as "Supernatural Giga". A giga is a picture or illustration of comical intent, roughly translated as "caricature". See Chōjū-jinbutsu-giga.) is a Japanese manga series written and illustrated by Satsuki Satō. It was serialized in Shogakukan's Weekly Shōnen Sunday from April 2017 to November 2021, with its chapters collected in eleven tankōbon volumes.

== Publication ==
Written and illustrated by Satsuki Satō, Yōkai Giga was serialized in Shogakukan's Weekly Shōnen Sunday from April 26, 2017, to November 24, 2021. Shogakukan collected its chapters in eleven tankōbon volumes, released from September 15, 2017, to March 17, 2022.

=== Volumes ===
No.	Japanese release date	Japanese ISBN
1	September 15, 2017	978-4-09-127690-2
2	March 12, 2018	978-4-09-128207-1
3	September 12, 2018	978-4-09-128548-5
4	March 12, 2019	978-4-09-129109-7
5	October 11, 2019	978-4-09-129468-5
6	March 12, 2020	978-4-09-850089-5
7	July 16, 2021	978-4-09-850663-7
8	August 18, 2021	978-4-09-850682-8
9	January 18, 2022	978-4-09-850883-9
10	February 18, 2022	978-4-09-850883-9
11	March 17, 2022	978-4-09-851018-4

== Reception ==
The series was recommended by manga author Inio Asano. Gō Sasakibara of The Asahi Shimbun commended the depiction of the yōkai creatures presented in the series and compared Satō's detailed art with humorous touch to Shigeru Mizuki's work, the late manga artist and yōkai specialist known for GeGeGe no Kitarō.
