= Waltz in a White Dress =

Japanese manga series

円舞曲は白いドレスで (Warutsu wa Shiroi Doresu de)
- Manga
- Written by: Chiho Saito
- Published by: Shogakukan
- Magazine: Shōjo Comic
- Published: 1990
- Volumes: 4
- Manga

Lilac Nocturne
- Written by: Chiho Saito
- Published by: Shogakukan
- Magazine: Shōjo Comic Special Edition
- Published: 1992
- Volumes: 1
- Manga

Magnolia Waltz
- Written by: Chiho Saito
- Published by: Shogakukan
- Magazine: Petit Comic
- Published: 1994
- Volumes: 3
- Manga

Koimonogatari
- Written by: Chiho Saito
- Published by: Shogakukan
- Published: 1995
- Volumes: 1

Waltz in a White Dress (円舞曲は白いドレスで, Warutsu wa Shiroi Doresu de) is a Japanese shōjo/josei manga written and illustrated by Chiho Saito in 1990. The story is set in late 1930s Asia, on the eve of World War II.

After four volumes in 1990, the series later continued with the spin-off Lilac Nocturne (紫丁香夜想曲 LILAC NOCTURNE, Shiteikō Yazōkyoku: Lilac Nocturne) in 1992, the three-volume sequel Magnolia Waltz (白木蘭円舞曲) in 1994, and an epilogue included in Love Stories (恋物語, Koimonogatari) in 1995.

== Characters ==
- Koto, a Japanese girl who aspires to be a tailor
- Sajit Aster, an Indian freedom fighter struggling for independence against British Empire
- Masaomi Kidoin, a Japanese imperial soldier serving the Japanese Empire
- Ryuichi Kidoin, Masaomi's elder brother

== Volume list ==
=== Waltz in a White Dress ===
No.	Release date	ISBN
1	May 26, 1990	4-09-133411-3
2	August 27, 1990	4-09-133412-1
3	October 26, 1990	4-09-133413-X
4	December 17, 1990	4-09-133414-8

=== Lilac Nocturne ===
No.	Release date	ISBN
1	March 26, 1992	4-09-132637-4

=== Magnolia Waltz ===
No.	Release date	ISBN
1	June 25, 1994	4-09-136081-5
2	November 26, 1994	4-09-136082-3
3	April 26, 1995	4-09-136083-1
