= Hoankan Evans no Uso =

Japanese manga series

- Hoankan Evans no Uso: Dead or Love
- First volume cover featuring Elmore Evans (center) and Phoebe Oakley (top)

保安官エヴァンスの嘘～DEAD OR LOVE～ (Hoankan Evansu no Uso Deddo oa Rabu)
- Genre: Comedy, Western
- Manga
- Written by: Mizuki Kuriyama
- Published by: Shogakukan
- Imprint: Shōnen Sunday Comics
- Magazine: Weekly Shōnen Sunday
- Original run: April 12, 2017 – April 20, 2022
- Volumes: 20
- icon

Hoankan Evans no Uso: Dead or Love (Japanese: 保安官エヴァンスの嘘～DEAD OR LOVE～, Hepburn: Hoankan Evansu no Uso Deddo oa Rabu; lit. 'The Lies of the Sheriff Evans: Dead or Love') is a Japanese manga series written and illustrated by Mizuki Kuriyama. It was serialized in Shogakukan's shōnen manga magazine Weekly Shōnen Sunday from April 2017 to April 2022, with its chapters collected in 20 tankōbon volumes.

== Plot ==
The story follows lawman Elmore Evans, who, despite being one of the most amazing gunslingers in the West, cannot get rid of his bad luck in his romantic life.

== Characters ==
Elmore Evans (エルモア・エヴァンス, Erumoa Evuansu)
The Sheriff of a small town in the Wild West. He is skilled at his work and weapon handling, but terrible with women. He says things that are not necessarily true to impress women, often getting into wacky predicaments.
Phoebe Oakley (フィービー・オークレイ, Fībī Ōkurei)
A bounty hunter and a self-proclaimed rival of Sheriff Evans. She has feelings for Evans, but cannot express them due to her pride.
Evans' father (エヴァンスの父, Evuansu no Chichi)
The former Sheriff of the town. His words and lessons are followed by his son.
Ted Hall (テッド・ホール, Teddo Hōru)
Evans' deputy sheriff.
Abby Earp (アビー・アーブ, Abī Ābu)
A Deputy U.S. Marshall operating in the region. She is clumsy and is often thought to be angry by others, but is in fact a self-conscious person.
Ruben Wayne (ルーベン・ウェイン, Rūben Uein)
The Sheriff of Mark Flag, a neighboring village.

== Publication ==
Hoankan Evans no Uso: Dead or Love, written and illustrated by Mizuki Kuriyama, was serialized in Shogakukan's shōnen manga magazine Weekly Shōnen Sunday from April 12, 2017, to April 20, 2022. Shogakukan collected its chapters in twenty tankōbon volumes, released from September 15, 2017, to June 17, 2022.

=== Volumes ===
No.	Japanese release date	Japanese ISBN
1	September 15, 2017	978-4-09-127688-9
2	December 18, 2017	978-4-09-127878-4
3	February 16, 2018	978-4-09-128087-9
4	May 18, 2018	978-4-09-128250-7
5	September 15, 2018	978-4-09-128394-8
6	December 18, 2018	978-4-09-128716-8
7	March 18, 2019	978-4-09-128886-8
8	June 18, 2019	978-4-09-129177-6
9	September 18, 2019	978-4-09-129335-0
10	December 18, 2019	978-4-09-129455-5
11	March 18, 2020	978-4-09-129562-0
12	June 18, 2020	978-4-09-850081-9
13	September 18, 2020	978-4-09-850177-9
14	December 18, 2020	978-4-09-850286-8
15	March 17, 2021	978-4-09-850398-8
16	June 17, 2021	978-4-09-850534-0
17	September 17, 2021	978-4-09-850647-7
18	December 17, 2021	978-4-09-850737-5
19	March 17, 2022	978-4-09-850878-5
20	June 17, 2022	978-4-09-851150-1
