= Mint de Kiss Me =

Japanese manga

Mint de Kiss me (ミントで Kiss me, lit: Kiss Me With Mint) is a collection of 8 short stories in manga format (tankōbon) written and illustrated by Yuu Watase in 1994, and subsequently distributed in Japan by Shogakukan in January 1995 as part of the Flower Comics (フラワーコミックス) collection. This tankōbon is made up of: Kiss Me With Mint, Genseika, Seal Of Flower, Yamato Nadeshiko Romance, Sand Tiara, Hatsuki Triangle, 700 Days of Blue, and Jewel in Heart respectively. Among these, Yuu Watase chose "Kiss Me With Mint" to be the main story of this collection.

== Plot ==
Misono Kari, a high school student with a crush on her teacher, Toono, discovers a magic spell where two people's spirits will switch bodies if they eat a mint candy and then kiss. Misono tries to kiss Toono using the magic candy, but accidentally kisses Shindou, a boy who has been bothering her. Misono's spirit leaves her body and enters Shindou's body, and vice versa. They must navigate their daily lives while trying to find a way to reverse the body-switching spell, learning about each other's lives and secrets.
