= Don't XXX With Teachers! =

Japanese manga series

- First tankōbon volume cover, featuring Yui-chan-sensei

先生で○○しちゃいけません! (Sensei de Marumaru Shicha Ikemasen!)
- Genre: Erotic comedy
- Manga
- Written by: Sabu Musha
- Published by: Shogakukan
- English publisher: NA: Comikey (digital)
- Imprint: Ura Sunday Comics
- Magazine: MangaONE; Ura Sunday
- Original run: April 30, 2019 – January 24, 2023
- Volumes: 7
- icon

Don't XXX With Teachers! (先生で○○しちゃいけません!, Sensei de Marumaru Shicha Ikemasen!) is a Japanese web manga series written and illustrated by Sabu Musha. It was serialized on Shogakukan's online platforms MangaONE and Ura Sunday from April 2019 to January 2023, with its chapters collected in seven tankōbon volumes.

== Plot ==
Yui, a sex education teacher, is popular with students because of her attractiveness and rumors about her sex life. When students ask her for advice, she tries to help them without anyone figuring out that she has never been in a relationship.

== Publication ==
Written and illustrated by Sabu Musha, Don't XXX With Teachers! began serialization on Shogakukan's online platform MangaONE on April 30, 2019; it also debuted on Ura Sunday on May 7 of the same year. The series finished on January 24, 2023. Shogakukan collected its chapters in seven tankōbon volumes, released from March 19, 2020, to March 10, 2023.

The series is published digitally in English by Comikey.

=== Volumes ===
No.	Release date	ISBN
1	March 19, 2020	978-4-09-850044-4
2	July 10, 2020	978-4-09-850199-1
3	December 18, 2020	978-4-09-850363-6
4	June 10, 2021	978-4-09-850593-7
5	December 17, 2021	978-4-09-850840-2
6	August 10, 2022	978-4-09-851231-7
7	March 10, 2023	978-4-09-851231-7
