= Marine Hunter =

Japanese manga series

- First volume cover

マリンハンター (Marin Hantaa)
- Manga
- Written by: Shiro Otsuka
- Published by: Shogakukan
- Imprint: Shōnen Sunday Comics
- Magazine: Weekly Shōnen Sunday
- Original run: August 8, 2007 – May 28, 2008
- Volumes: 5

Marine Hunter (Japanese: マリンハンター, Hepburn: Marin Hantā) is a Japanese manga series written and illustrated by Shiro Otsuka. It was serialized in Shogakukan's Weekly Shōnen Sunday from August 2007 to May 2008, with its chapters collected in five tankōbon volumes.

== Plot ==
At the end of the 21st century, the Earth is almost entirely covered by water. Human/fish hybrids known as "Fish-Halves" inherit the earth.

== Characters ==
Shark (シャーク, Shāku)
A sixteen-year-old Fish-Half that is part human, part great white shark, he has a tendency to go berserk whenever he smells blood, killing any humans that happen to be nearby. He is battling against the navy, as he tries to free himself from their influence.
Guppy (グッピー, Guppī)
A fourteen-year-old girl who was captured by the navy and rescued by Shark.
Shijimi (シジミ)
A young Fish-Half that is part human, part shellfish. Her island was attacked by the navy, causing her to join up with Shark.
Blue Whale (ブルー・ホエール, Burū Hoēru)
As his name implies, he is a Fish-Half that is half human, half blue whale. He is also a rear admiral in the navy that Shark is fighting against.

== Publication ==
Marine Hunter, written and illustrated by Shiro Otsuka, ran in Shogakukan Weekly Shōnen Sunday from August 8, 2007, to May 28, 2008. (Note: The 2008–26th issue of the magazine (cover date June 11) was released on May 28.) Shogakukan collected its chapters in five tankōbon volumes, released from October 18, 2007, to August 11, 2008.

The series was licensed in France by Pika Édition, and the five volumes were released from November 2, 2010, to July 6, 2011. The series was discontinued in 2013.

=== Volumes ===
No.	Japanese release date	Japanese ISBN
1	October 18, 2007	978-4-09-121206-1
2	December 15, 2007	978-4-09-121249-8
3	March 18, 2008	978-4-09-121300-6
4	June 18, 2008	978-4-09-121410-2
5	August 11, 2008	978-4-09-121459-1
