= Saikyō! Toritsu Aoizaka Kōkō Yakyūbu =

Japanese manga series by Motoyuki Tanaka

- First tankōbon volume cover, featuring Suzuo Sugawara

最強!都立あおい坂高校野球部
- Genre: Sports
- Manga
- Written by: Motoyuki Tanaka
- Published by: Shogakukan
- Imprint: Shōnen Sunday Comics
- Magazine: Weekly Shōnen Sunday
- Original run: January 4, 2005 – April 14, 2010
- Volumes: 26
- icon

Saikyō! Toritsu Aoizaka Kōkō Yakyūbu (最強!都立あおい坂高校野球部; 'Strongest! Aoizaka Metropolitan High School Baseball Club') is a Japanese manga series written and illustrated by Motoyuki Tanaka. It was serialized in Shogakukan's Weekly Shōnen Sunday from January 2005 to April 2010, with its chapters collected in 26 tankōbon volumes. In 2008, the manga won the 32nd Kodansha Manga Award for the shōnen category.

== Story ==
Six years ago, following an important defeat, a group of friends promised that they would one day take their friend Suzuo to the Koshien. Now, in their first year of high school, the friends have reunited behind the pitcher, Kitarō Kitaōji, to keep their promise. With Suzuo as their manager and Kitarō's left-handed, underhand "Submarine Pitch", they may just go all the way.

== Publication ==
Written and illustrated by Motoyuki Tanaka, Saikyō! Toritsu Aoizaka Kōkō Yakyūbu was serialized in Shogakukan's shōnen manga magazine Weekly Shōnen Sunday from January 4, 2005, to April 14, 2010. Shogakukan collected its chapters in 26 tankōbon volumes, released from April 18, 2005, to June 18, 2010.

=== Volumes ===
No.	Japanese release date	Japanese ISBN
1	April 18, 2005	978-4-09-126374-2
2	June 16, 2005	978-4-09-126375-9
3	August 8, 2005	978-4-09-126376-6
4	October 18, 2005	978-4-09-126377-3
5	January 14, 2006	978-4-09-120046-4
6	March 17, 2006	978-4-09-120129-4
7	May 18, 2006	978-4-09-120375-5
8	August 11, 2006	978-4-09-120567-4
9	November 17, 2006	978-4-09-120677-0
10	January 13, 2007	978-4-09-120870-5
11	March 16, 2007	978-4-09-120879-8
12	June 18, 2007	978-4-09-121078-4
13	August 10, 2007	978-4-09-121158-3
14	November 16, 2007	978-4-09-121217-7
15	February 18, 2008	978-4-09-121284-9
16	June 18, 2008	978-4-09-121400-3
17	September 18, 2008	978-4-09-121467-6
18	December 18, 2008	978-4-09-121517-8
19	March 18, 2009	978-4-09-121597-0
20	May 18, 2009	978-4-09-122006-6
21	August 18, 2009	978-4-09-121718-9
22	November 18, 2009	978-4-09-121885-8
23	January 18, 2010	978-4-09-122110-0
24	March 18, 2010	978-4-09-122186-5
25	May 18, 2010	978-4-09-122327-2
26	June 18, 2010	978-4-09-122350-0

== Reception ==
In 2008, the manga won the 32nd Kodansha Manga Award for the shōnen category.

== See also ==
- Be Blues!, another manga series by the same author
