= Itsuwaribito =

Japanese manga series by Yuuki Iinuma

- First tankōbon volume cover

いつわりびと◆空◆ (Itsuwaribito ◆Utsuho◆)
- Genre: Adventure, comedy
- Manga
- Written by: Yuuki Iinuma
- Published by: Shogakukan
- English publisher: NA: Viz Media
- Imprint: Shōnen Sunday Comics
- Magazine: Weekly Shōnen Sunday; (January 28, 2009 – February 10, 2010); Club Sunday; (February 19, 2010 – August 27, 2013)
- Original run: January 28, 2009 – August 27, 2013
- Volumes: 23
- icon

Itsuwaribito (Japanese: いつわりびと◆空◆, Hepburn: Itsuwaribito Utsuho; lit. 'Lying Person') is a Japanese manga series written and illustrated by Yuuki Iinuma. It was serialized in Shogakukan's shōnen manga magazine Weekly Shōnen Sunday, running from January 2009 to February 2010, and it was subsequently transferred to the Club Sunday website, where it ran from February 2010 to August 2013. Its chapters were collected in 23 tankōbon volumes. In North America, it was licensed for English release by Viz Media.

== Plot ==
Utsuho's childhood honesty inadvertently caused a major disaster, leading him to adopt a life of deception thereafter. Raised in an orphan village by a monk, he became a habitual troublemaker. Though the monk encouraged him to aid others, Utsuho refused to abandon his deceitful ways, instead resolving to use his talent for trickery for benevolent purposes.

During his travels, he befriended three companions: Pochi, an innocent tanuki; Yakuma, a disciplined and skilled young doctor; and Neya, a graceful teenage Itsuwaribito (professional liar) with a guileless demeanor. Together, they journeyed across Japan, where Utsuho sought to expand his makeshift family and assist others through his lies.

== Characters ==
Main characters of the series. Counter-clockwise from bottom center: Utsuho (with Pochi in front of him), Neya, Iwashi, Hikae, Uzume, Minamo, Chouza and Yakuma.

Utsuho Azako (天邪狐 空, Azako Utsuho)
A skilled white-haired teenaged boy deceiver who adopts lying as a philosophy after childhood trauma. Orphaned when thieves murdered his parents—a tragedy he blames on his own truthful testimony as a child—he is taken in by a priest who implores him on his deathbed to "believe in people" while tasking him with saving 1,000 lives. Utsuho embarks on this mission as an Itsuwaribito (professional liar), wielding dual blades and excelling in combat strategy, bomb-making, disguise, and medical aid. Though he revels in tricking others—particularly his frequent target Yakuma—he despises being deceived himself. His Kansai dialect and book-learned knowledge often contrast with his childlike excitement when encountering new experiences.
Pochi/Ponpokoriichitchoriina III (ぽち / ぽんぽこりーちっちょリーナIII世, Pochi/Ponpokoriichicchoriina San Se)
A young, genderless tanuki who speaks human language and refers to itself in the first person. Rescued by Utsuho from a trapper who killed its mother, Pochi becomes the first companion on Utsuho's mission to save 1,000 people. Noted for its polite speech (adding "-san" to names) and optimistic naivety, Pochi serves as Utsuho's moral opposite - incapable of deception but gifted with pure-hearted simplicity that enables it to acquire the "Seven-Colored Rainbow," one of the Nine Treasures others could not obtain. Though initially timid, Pochi develops courage under Utsuho's influence, eventually confronting danger to protect its savior. Its childlike personality manifests in drawn-out speech patterns marked by tilde symbols and enthusiastic hand-clapping when moved.
Koshiro Yakuma (薬馬 小四郎, Yakuma Koshirou)
An 18-year-old foreign physician serving as the serious tsukkomi counterpart to Utsuho's antics. Despite initially distrusting itsuwaribito, he becomes a trusted ally valued for his medical expertise, physical strength, and sharp perception—able to detect disguises and unspoken affections. His protective nature toward the group earns him maternal nicknames. Summoned by the emperor for treatment, he pursues a cure with devotion to the empress that transcends professional duty.
Neya Muito (六兎 閨, Muito Neya)
Neya is a 16-year-old female Itsuwaribito exiled to Nadeshiko Island despite committing no crimes. With crimson eyes and pink-tinted hair, she speaks in refined aristocratic language and wields kunai concealed by her bow. Though skilled in deception (having even tricked Utsuho), she exhibits occasional clumsiness that belies her composed demeanor. After overstaying her prison term to care for the island's children, the villagers manipulated her departure with Utsuho, inspiring her goal to establish a mainland settlement for them. She harbors unrequited affection for Utsuho while recruiting Yakuma as the prospective village doctor. Orphaned in youth, Neya was adopted by Princess Oni-hime as a body double due to their identical appearance. Their sisterly bond ended when the princess sacrificed herself during a castle attack, gifting Neya the Peacock Feather treasure before her death. This tragedy led Neya to seek refuge on Nadeshiko Island.
Hikae Nibyou (弐猫 控, Nibyō Hikae)
A guardian of the Eye Stone (瞳石, Hitomi Ishi), one of the Nine Treasures. With beast-like eyes and spiked green hair tied with a bandana, Hikae claims to have lived over 500 years—a plausible assertion given his rapid healing from fatal wounds and immunity to poisons. He exhibits an enigmatic, amoral personality, valuing only entertainment and showing particular disdain for Neya and Yakuma while favoring Utsuho and Pochi. His philosophy centers on seeking amusement above all else, disregarding conventional morality. After suffering a mental breakdown during a treasure trial alongside Utsuho, Hikae joins the group as an ally. His extensive knowledge of the Nine Treasures frequently guides their travels, though his inappropriate remarks often cause conflicts. As a combatant, he wields tekkō-kagi (bladed gloves). His immortal physiology requires neither food nor sleep, making him an ever-vigilant night watchman.
Iwashi Yashima (八嶋 岩清, Yashima Iwashi)
A 20-year-old ruler of the male-exclusive Yome Mura (Bride Village). She possesses the Cherry Blossom Rouge treasure and takes pride in her renowned beauty, often wearing revealing clothing to showcase her flawless skin. Initially despising anything unattractive, she rebuilt her village and banished men, animals, and the infirm. Her perspective changes after Utsuho presents her with a mirror as "the world's most beautiful thing," prompting her to join his journey, readmit the exiled villagers, and address Utsuho with honorific reverence. Despite her vanity, Iriya demonstrates unexpected kindness, even befriending romantic rival Neya while assisting with fashion advice. Her practical skills and adaptability make her a valuable companion, though she occasionally employs seduction as a tactical weapon.
Uzume (烏頭目)
A 19-year-old warrior allied with Kuroha, leader of his group. He is characterized by his simple-minded nature and cheerful demeanor. Despite his limited intellect—often mispronouncing words and serving as comic relief—he possesses exceptional combat skills with his three-section sickle staff, effective at any range. Though initially ostracized since childhood and prone to destructive impulses, he demonstrates childlike loyalty to those he cherishes. His honest nature frequently leads to accidental disclosures of sensitive information. After forming an unexpected friendship with Utsuho and developing affection for Neya, Uzume undergoes significant personal growth. He resolves to live without killing, creating tension with Kuroha. Following conflicts at Bride Village and the capital, he ultimately joins Utsuho's group with his comrades Chouza and Minamo committed to building a world free from suffering.

== Publication ==
Written and illustrated by Yuuki Iinuma, Itsuwaribito started in Shogakukan's shōnen manga magazine Weekly Shōnen Sunday on January 28, 2009. (Note: It started in the magazine's ninth issue of 2009 (cover date February 11), released on January 28 of that same year.) The series ran for 51 chapters, until February 10, 2010. It was then transferred to Shogakukan's website Club Sunday, starting on February 19, 2010. The series finished with its 223rd chapter on August 27, 2013, and an additional chapter was released on September 3 of the same year. Shogakukan collected its chapters in 23 tankōbon volumes, released from May 18, 2009, to November 18, 2013.

In North America; Viz Media announced they license of the manga in July 2010. Viz Media released the volumes from December 14, 2010, to April 10, 2018.

=== Volumes ===
No.	Original release date	Original ISBN	English release date	English ISBN
1	May 18, 2009	978-4-09-122013-4	December 14, 2010	978-1-4215-3756-6
2	August 18, 2009	978-4-09-12172-64	April 12, 2011	978-1-4215-3757-3
3	November 18, 2009	978-4-09-121891-9	August 9, 2011	978-1-4215-3827-3
4	February 18, 2010	978-4-09-122167-4	December 13, 2011	978-1-4215-3828-0
5	May 18, 2010	978-4-09-122300-5	April 10, 2012	978-1-4215-4064-1
6	August 18, 2010	978-4-09122515-3	August 14, 2012	978-1-4215-4148-8
7	November 18, 2010	978-4-09-122670-9	December 11, 2012	978-1-4215-4149-5
8	February 18, 2011	978-4-09-122785-0	April 9, 2013	978-1-4215-5004-6
9	May 18, 2011	978-4-09-122887-1	August 13, 2013	978-1-4215-5364-1
10	August 18, 2011	978-4-09-123225-0	December 10, 2013	978-1-4215-5673-4
11	October 18, 2011	978-4-09-123360-8	April 8, 2014	978-1-4215-6450-0
12	February 17, 2012	978-4-09-123556-5	August 12, 2014	978-1-4215-6523-1
13	April 18, 2012	978-4-09-123644-9	December 9, 2014	978-1-4215-6524-8
14	June 18, 2012	978-4-09-123704-0	April 14, 2015	978-1-4215-6525-5
15	August 17, 2012	978-4-09-123800-9	August 11, 2015	978-1-4215-7789-0
16	August 17, 2012	978-4-09-123862-7	December 8, 2015	978-1-4215-7790-6
17	October 18, 2012	978-4-09-124003-3	April 12, 2016	978-1-4215-7791-3
18	January 18, 2013	978-4-09-124174-0	August 9, 2016	978-1-4215-8388-4
19	April 18, 2013	978-4-09-124287-7	December 13, 2016	978-1-4215-8389-1
20	June 18, 2013	978-4-09-124325-6	April 11, 2017	978-1-4215-8390-7
21	August 16, 2013	978-4-09-124358-4	August 8, 2017	978-1-4215-9329-6
22	October 18, 2013	978-4-09-124454-3	December 12, 2017	978-1-4215-9330-2
23	November 18, 2013	978-4-09-124504-5	April 10, 2018	978-1-4215-9331-9

== Reception ==
Carlo Santos, writing for Anime News Network, felt that the series was a generic shōnen adventure series but enjoyed the lead's moral ambiguity, feeling it spiced up fight scenes. He criticized the poor pacing in the second volume. Katherine Dacey described the manga as a "tonal mess," contrasting the bloody fight scenes with the cute talking tanuki and the "uncomplicated" protagonist. Leroy Douresseaux felt the series had potential, enjoying the premise, and feeling that the series hit its stride more in the second volume. Danica Davidson felt that the lead became more sympathetic during the first volume. Holly von Winckel noted the extreme violence used by the author to distinguish the protagonist from the 'real' bad guys, feeling that the tanuki character was an "antidote" to this strong violence. Patti Martinson felt that the premise was gimmicky, but that the second volume "explored" the issue more than she had hoped. Nick Smith described the lead character as being an "even less likeable version of Naruto," summing up the first volume as being both enjoyable and frustrating. Deb Aoki noted the combination of gore and cute elements, making the first volume "difficult to recommend." Davey C. Jones enjoyed the fast pace of the second volume.
