= Shiroyama to Mita-san =

Japanese manga series by Yuuhei Kusakabe

- First tankōbon volume cover

白山と三田さん
- Genre: Romantic comedy
- Manga
- Written by: Yuuhei Kusakabe
- Published by: Shogakukan
- Imprint: Shōnen Sunday Comics
- Magazine: Weekly Shōnen Sunday
- Original run: December 8, 2021 – January 17, 2024
- Volumes: 10
- icon

Shiroyama to Mita-san (白山と三田さん; "Shiroyama and Mita-san") is a Japanese manga series written and illustrated by Yuuhei Kusakabe. It was serialized in Shogakukan's shōnen manga magazine Weekly Shōnen Sunday from December 2021 to January 2024, with its chapters collected in ten tankōbon volumes.

== Publication ==
Shiroyama to Mita-san, written and illustrated by Yuuhei Kusakabe, was serialized in Shogakukan's shōnen manga magazine Weekly Shōnen Sunday from December 8, 2021, to January 17, 2024. Shogakukan collected its chapters in ten tankōbon volumes, released from April 18, 2022, to March 18, 2024.

=== Volumes ===
No.	Japanese release date	Japanese ISBN
1	April 18, 2022	978-4-09-851061-0
2	May 18, 2022	978-4-09-851125-9
3	August 18, 2022	978-4-09-851222-5
4	November 18, 2022	978-4-09-851389-5
5	February 16, 2023	978-4-09-851603-2
6	May 18, 2023	978-4-09-852054-1
7	August 18, 2023	978-4-09-852781-6
8	November 17, 2023	978-4-09-853014-4
9	February 16, 2024	978-4-09-853113-4
10	March 18, 2024	978-4-09-853179-0

== Reception ==
The series was nominated for the 2022 Next Manga Award in the print manga category and placed 10th out of 50 nominees.
