= Artist Acro =

Japanese manga series

- First tankōbon volume cover

アーティストアクロ (Aateisuto Akuro)
- Manga
- Written by: Ato Sakurai
- Published by: Shogakukan
- Imprint: Shōnen Sunday Comics
- Magazine: Weekly Shōnen Sunday; (July 16, 2008 – October 31, 2009); Club Sunday; (November 3, 2009 – March 16, 2010)
- Original run: July 2, 2008 – March 16, 2010
- Volumes: 9
- icon

Artist Acro (Japanese: アーティストアクロ, Hepburn: Aateisuto Akuro) is a Japanese manga series written and illustrated by Ato Sakurai. It was serialized in Shogakukan's shōnen manga magazine Weekly Shōnen Sunday from July 2008 to October 2009, and later on Club Sunday from November 2009 to March 2010. Its chapters were collected in nine tankōbon volumes.

== Story ==
The series is set in a world where artists possess supernatural abilities called "skills". Artists require physical materials to manipulate in order to create supernatural phenomena, and skills require practice to use properly. Prior to the main events, a social hierarchy formed in which people with less developed or no skills were used as test subjects by those who were artists. Acro Hanbakka, a young boy, travels to the capital city, the Capital of the Arts, to hone his skills and become a great artist.

== Publication ==
Written and illustrated by Ato Sakurai, Artist Acro was serialized in Shogakukan's Weekly Shōnen Sunday from July 2, 2008, (Note: It started in the magazine's 31st issue of 2008 (with cover date July 16), released on July 2 of that same year (same date of Sakurai's first message on Web Sunday's Backstage).) to October 31, 2009. It was transferred to Shogakukan's online magazine Club Sunday on November 3, 2009, and finished on March 16, 2010. Shogakukan collected its chapters in nine tankōbon volumes, published from January 16, 2009, and May 18, 2010.

=== Volumes ===
No.	Japanese release date	Japanese ISBN
1	January 16, 2009	978-4-09-121577-2
2	March 18, 2009	978-4-09-121618-2
3	June 18, 2009	978-4-09-122022-6
4	August 18, 2009	978-4-09-121723-3
5	November 18, 2009	978-4-09-121888-9
6	January 18, 2010	978-4-09-122138-4
7	March 18, 2010	978-4-09-122189-6
8	April 16, 2010	978-4-09-122029-5
9	May 18, 2010	978-4-09-122298-5
