= Daiku no Hatō =

Japanese manga series

- First tankōbon volume cover, featuring Minato Ebihara

第九の波濤
- Manga
- Written by: Michiteru Kusaba
- Published by: Shogakukan
- Imprint: Shōnen Sunday Comics
- Magazine: Weekly Shōnen Sunday
- Original run: April 19, 2017 – April 26, 2023
- Volumes: 24
- icon

Daiku no Hatō (第九の波濤; lit. 'The Ninth Wave') is a Japanese manga series written and illustrated by Michiteru Kusaba. It was serialized in Shogakukan's shōnen manga magazine from April 2017 to April 2023, with its chapters collected in 24 tankōbon volumes.

== Plot ==
Minato Ebihara (海老原 湊, Ebihara Minato), a fashionable Tokyo-born boy with over 10,000 social media followers, visits the coastal town of Uki in Isahaya, Nagasaki Prefecture, for his late father's 17th memorial service. While dining at a local seafood restaurant called Iso Ryōri Taira, he discovers they have run out of fish—until a waitress, Nagiko Taira (平良 凪子, Taira Nagiko), swiftly catches an ají (horse mackerel) from the sea, prepares it as sashimi, and serves it to him. This encounter with Nagiko marks a turning point in Minato's life. After bonding with her and her brother over fishing, he falls in love with her. Determined to pursue her, he enrolls in the Fisheries Department at Nagasaki University, dreaming of a sweet campus life together. However, the department proves far more intense than he anticipated, filled with eccentric and strong-willed individuals. During orientation, Minato and the other freshmen endure a rough initiation at the hands of Nagiko's brother and the upperclassmen, setting the stage for his challenging yet transformative journey ahead.

== Publication ==
Written and illustrated by Michiteru Kusaba, Daiku no Hatō was serialized in Shogakukan's shōnen manga magazine Weekly Shōnen Sunday from April 19, 2017, to April 26, 2023. Kusaba explained that the series' title was inspired by Ivan Aivazovsky's The Ninth Wave and that he aimed to create a work that evoked the same powerful impression as the painting had on him. Shogakukan collected its chapters in 24 tankōbon volumes, released from September 15, 2017, to July 18, 2023.

=== Volumes ===
No.	Japanese release date	Japanese ISBN
1	September 15, 2017	978-4-09-127691-9
2	September 15, 2017	978-4-09-127692-6
3	December 18, 2017	978-4-09-127879-1
4	March 16, 2018	978-4-09-128096-1
5	July 18, 2018	978-4-09-128339-9
6	November 16, 2018	978-4-09-128570-6
7	March 18, 2019	978-4-09-128810-3
8	July 18, 2019	978-4-09-129309-1
9	November 18, 2019	978-4-09-129442-5
10	February 18, 2020	978-4-09-129557-6
11	June 18, 2020	978-4-09-850074-1
12	September 18, 2020	978-4-09-850173-1
13	December 18, 2020	978-4-09-850288-2
14	March 17, 2021	978-4-09-850397-1
15	June 17, 2021	978-4-09-850533-3
16	September 17, 2021	978-4-09-850649-1
17	December 17, 2021	978-4-09-850738-2
18	March 17, 2022	978-4-09-850875-4
19	June 17, 2022	978-4-09-851147-1
20	September 15, 2022	978-4-09-851259-1
21	December 16, 2022	978-4-09-851476-2
22	March 16, 2023	978-4-09-851768-8
23	May 18, 2023	978-4-09-852056-5
24	July 18, 2023	978-4-09-852618-5

== See also ==
- Fantasista, another manga series by the same author
