= Jinmen (manga) =

Japanese manga series

- First volume cover

ジンメン
- Genre: Horror
- Manga
- Written by: Takahiro Katō
- Published by: Shogakukan
- Imprint: Shōnen Sunday Comics Special
- Magazine: Sunday Webry
- Original run: July 13, 2016 – June 24, 2019
- Volumes: 13
- icon

Jinmen (ジンメン) is a Japanese manga series written and illustrated by Takahiro Katō. It was serialized on Shogakukan's Sunday Webry manga website from July 2016 to June 2019, with its chapters collected in thirteen tankōbon volumes.

== Plot ==
Masato Jingū is an animal lover who returns to his hometown for the first time in seven years after transferring schools. Masato invites his childhood friend Hitomi on a date to the zoo that he had frequented in his youth. However, they and zoo employee Nakata are suddenly attacked by animals with human faces. While seeking escape from the animals, named "Jinmen", Nakata discloses that the Jinmen are the result of experiments carried out by the zoo director under the guise of health checkups. The group eventually finds itself trapped behind a gigantic circular trench surrounding the Mount Fuji area and containing the Jinmen. An unusually expedient government reports zero casualties from the formation of this trench, and an electromagnetic field prevents helicopters from rescuing trapped humans, whom the Jinmen begin capturing to use as livestock. The trio make their way to the local JSDF base to seek an escape over the trench.

== Publication ==
Written and illustrated by Takahiro Katō, Jinmen was serialized on Shogakukan's Sunday Webry manga website from July 13, 2016, to June 24, 2019. Shogakukan collected its chapters in thirteen tankōbon volumes, released from January 12, 2017, to September 12, 2019.

=== Volumes ===
No.	Japanese release date	Japanese ISBN
1	January 12, 2017	978-4-09-127533-2
2	March 10, 2017	978-4-09-127582-0
3	May 12, 2017	978-4-09-127610-0
4	August 10, 2017	978-4-09-127715-2
5	November 10, 2017	978-4-09-127891-3
6	February 9, 2018	978-4-09-128100-5
7	May 11, 2018	978-4-09-128284-2
8	August 9, 2018	978-4-09-128457-0
9	November 12, 2018	978-4-09-128696-3
10	February 12, 2019	978-4-09-128855-4
11	May 10, 2019	978-4-09-129190-5
12	July 12, 2019	978-4-09-129348-0
13	September 12, 2019	978-4-09-129358-9

== Reception ==
In 2018, the manga was nominated for the 64th Shogakukan Manga Awards in the shōnen category.
