= Gaishū Isshoku! =

Japanese manga series

- First tankōbon volume cover, featuring Michiru Sakai

ガイシューイッショク！
- Genre: Erotic comedy
- Manga
- Written by: Konomi Shikishiro
- Published by: Shogakukan
- Imprint: Big Superior Comics
- Magazine: Big Comic Superior
- Original run: May 26, 2017 – present
- Volumes: 6
- icon

Gaishū Isshoku! (ガイシューイッショク！; 'Beating Hands Down!') is a Japanese manga series written and illustrated by Konomi Shikishiro. It has been serialized in Shogakukan's seinen manga magazine Big Comic Superior since May 2017.

== Synopsis ==
Hiromi Komori, an employee of a real estate agency, is visited by Michiru Sakai, who is looking for a place to live. However, Michiru has no income or guarantor. Although Komori tries sincerely to find her a place, he fails. His boss tells him to "get the cheap customers out quickly", so Komori urges Michiru to compromise, but she arrogantly rejects his offer and tells him to get to work. Angered, Komori says that if she wants a place to stay, she needs to work. If she does not like it, he tells her to stay in his spare room. Michiru storms out, but she is unable to find a place with any other real estate agent. She forces Komori to accept her by taking his phone and fabricating threatening material. Thus begins their strange life together.

== Publication ==
Written and illustrated by Konomi Shikishiro, Gaishū Isshoku! debuted in Shogakukan's seinen manga magazine Big Comic Superior on May 26, 2017. Shogakukan has collected its chapters into individual tankōbon volumes. The first volume was released on June 29, 2018. As of February 28, 2025, six volumes have been released.

=== Volumes ===
No.	Japanese release date	Japanese ISBN
1	June 29, 2018	978-4-09-189888-3
2	February 28, 2019	978-4-09-860230-8
3	November 29, 2019	978-4-09-860492-0
4	March 30, 2021	978-4-09-860858-4
5	April 28, 2023	978-4-09-861491-2
6	February 28, 2025	978-4-09-863206-0
