= Amano Megumi wa Sukidarake! =

Japanese manga series

- First tankōbon volume cover, featuring Manabu Shindō (left) and Megumi Amano (right)

天野めぐみはスキだらけ!
- Genre: Romantic comedy; Slice of life
- Manga
- Written by: Nekoguchi
- Published by: Shogakukan
- Imprint: Shōnen Sunday Comics
- Magazine: Shōnen Sunday S (2015); Weekly Shōnen Sunday (2015–2021)
- Original run: August 25, 2015 – September 1, 2021
- Volumes: 28
- icon

Amano Megumi wa Sukidarake! (天野めぐみはスキだらけ!; lit. 'Megumi Amano Is Full of Openings!') is a Japanese manga series written and illustrated by Nekoguchi. It was serialized in Shogakukan's Shōnen Sunday S magazine from August to October 2015 and subsequently transferred to the publisher's Weekly Shōnen Sunday magazine, where it ran from December 2015 to September 2021. Its chapters were collected in 28 tankōbon volumes.

== Synopsis ==
Manabu Shindō is a diligent high school student striving to secure admission to the University of Tokyo. However, his studies are constantly disrupted by his childhood friend, Megumi Amano—a carefree spirit whose obliviousness often results in Manabu getting an eyeful of her figure. Their chaotic dynamic leads to a string of comedic mishaps, testing Manabu's focus and patience at every turn.

== Characters ==
Manabu Shindō (進藤 学, Shindō Manabu)
Manabu is a studious high school student who is Megumi's childhood friend. His family owns a restaurant called Shindōken.
Megumi Amano (天野 めぐみ, Amano Megumi)
Megumi is a high school student who is Manabu's childhood friend. While she is in love with Manabu, she has not confessed this to him. She is a member of the kendo club.

== Publication ==
Written and illustrated by Nekoguchi, Amano Megumi wa Sukidarake! was first serialized in Shogakukan's Shōnen Sunday S magazine from August 25 to October 24, 2015. It was later transferred to Shogakukan's Weekly Shōnen Sunday magazine, where it was serialized from December 16, 2015, to September 1, 2021. Shogakukan collected its chapters in 28 tankōbon volumes, released from March 18, 2016, to November 18, 2021.

=== Volumes ===
No.	Japanese release date	Japanese ISBN
1	March 18, 2016	978-4-09-127007-8
2	June 17, 2016	978-4-09-127178-5
3	August 18, 2016	978-4-09-127320-8
4	October 12, 2016	978-4-09-127415-1
5	January 18, 2017	978-4-09-127486-1
6	April 18, 2017	978-4-09-127559-2
7	July 18, 2017	978-4-09-127668-1
8	October 18, 2017	978-4-09-127859-3
9	December 18, 2017	978-4-09-127887-6
10	March 16, 2018	978-4-09-128092-3
11	June 18, 2018	978-4-09-128255-2
12	August 17, 2018	978-4-09-128382-5
13	November 16, 2018	978-4-09-128578-2
14	February 18, 2019	978-4-09-128787-8
15	May 17, 2019	978-4-09-129148-6
16	July 18, 2019	978-4-09-129299-5
17	October 18, 2019	978-4-09-129431-9
18	January 17, 2020	978-4-09-129545-3
19	April 16, 2020	978-4-09-850065-9
20	June 18, 2020	978-4-09-850080-2
21	September 18, 2020	978-4-09-850176-2
22	November 18, 2020	978-4-09-850281-3
23	January 18, 2021	978-4-09-850379-7
24	April 16, 2021	978-4-09-850524-1
25	June 17, 2021	978-4-09-850532-6
26	September 17, 2021	978-4-09-850648-4
27	November 18, 2021	978-4-09-850732-0
28	November 18, 2021	978-4-09-850733-7
