= Saigo no Yūransen =

Japanese manga series

- First volume cover

最後の遊覧船
- Genre: Romance
- Manga
- Written by: Shinichi Sugimura
- Published by: Shogakukan
- Imprint: Big Comics
- Magazine: Big Comic Superior
- Original run: January 10, 2020 – August 28, 2020
- Volumes: 2
- icon

Saigo no Yūransen (最後の遊覧船; lit. 'The Last Pleasure Boat') is a Japanese manga series written and illustrated by Shinichi Sugimura. It was serialized in Shogakukan's seinen manga magazine Big Comic Superior from January to August 2020, with its chapters collected in two tankōbon volumes.

== Publication ==
Saigo no Yūransen, written and illustrated by Shinichi Sugimura, was serialized in Shogakukan's seinen manga magazine Big Comic Superior from January 10 to August 28, 2020. Shogakukan collected its chapters in two tankōbon volumes, released on July 30 and November 30, 2020.

The series was licensed in France by Le Lézard noir.

=== Volumes ===
| No. | Japanese release date | Japanese ISBN |
|---|---|---|
| 1 | July 30, 2020 | 978-4-09-860675-7 |
| 2 | November 30, 2020 | 978-4-09-860768-6 |

== Reception ==
The series has been recommended by manga artists Naoki Urasawa and Taro Nogizaka. Saigo no Yūransen ranked eighth on "The Best Manga 2021 Kono Manga wo Yome!" ranking by Freestyle magazine.
