= Nijitte Monogatari =

Japanese manga series

弐十手物語
- Manga
- Written by: Kazuo Koike
- Illustrated by: Satomi Kōe
- Published by: Shogakukan
- Magazine: Weekly Post
- Original run: 1978 – 2003
- Volumes: 110
- Manga

Shin Nijitte Monogatari 新・弐十手物語
- Written by: Kazuo Koike
- Illustrated by: Satomi Kōe
- Magazine: Weekly Post
- Original run: 2004 – 2005
- Manga

Shin Nijitte Monogatari Tsurujirō 新・弐十手物語 つるじろう
- Written by: Kazuo Koike
- Illustrated by: Satomi Kōe
- Magazine: GUTS PON
- Original run: 2011 – 2012
- Volumes: 1

Nijitte Monogatari (Japanese: 弐十手物語) is a Japanese manga series written by Kazuo Koike and illustrated by Satomi Kōe. It was published by Shogakukan since 1978 on Weekly Post and lasted until 2003. It was followed by two sequels, Shin Nijitte Monogatari and Shin Nijitte Monogatari Tsurujirō. It is one of the manga series with most volumes, with 110 volumes.
