= Ryoko (manga) =

Japanese manga series

- First tankōbon volume cover
- Genre: Action
- Manga
- Written by: Kaito Mitsuhashi
- Published by: Shogakukan
- Imprint: Shōnen Sunday Comics
- Magazine: Weekly Shōnen Sunday
- Original run: October 19, 2016 – June 26, 2019
- Volumes: 5

Ryoko (stylized in all caps) is a Japanese manga series written and illustrated by Kaito Mitsuhashi. It was serialized in Shogakukan's Weekly Shōnen Sunday from October 2016 to June 2019, with its chapters collected in five tankōbon volumes.

== Publication ==
Written and illustrated by Kaito Mitsuhashi, Ryoko was preceded by a work titled Ryoko Meet Meal!!, for which Mitsuhashi, at 21, won the Shin Shedai Sunday Award (New Generation Sunday Award) for his work in December 2015. Takenori Ichihara, then Shogakukan's Weekly Shōnen Sunday editor-in-chief, decided to make Ryoko a serialized work, making it the first time in 38 years that an editor-in-chief directly chooses a newcomer's work to be serialized in the magazine, since Rumiko Takahashi's Kattena Yatsura (Urusei Yatsura prototype) in 1978. It was also the first time that a newcomer award-winning work would be serialized in Weekly Shōnen Sunday, since Obi wo Gyutto Ne! by Katsutoshi Kawai (1989 debut) and Ushio & Tora by Kazuhiro Fujita (1990 debut).

The manga began in Weekly Shōnen Sunday on October 19, 2016. The manga went on hiatus after its 22nd chapter, published on March 29, 2017. The series resumed publication on January 23, 2019, and finished on June 26 of the same year. Shogakukan collected its chapters in five tankōbon volumes, released from February 17, 2017, to September 18, 2019.

=== Volumes ===
No.	Japanese release date	Japanese ISBN
1	February 17, 2017	978-4-09-127504-2
2	February 18, 2019	978-4-09-127556-1
3	February 18, 2019	978-4-09-128893-6
4	May 17, 2019	978-4-09-129160-8
5	September 18, 2019	978-4-09-129333-6
