= Sayonara Sorcier =

Japanese manga series

さよならソルシエ (Sayonara Sorushie)
- Genre: Historical, slice of life
- Manga
- Written by: Hozumi
- Published by: Shogakukan
- Magazine: Flowers
- Original run: August 28, 2012 – August 28, 2013
- Volumes: 2

Sayonara Sorcier (さよならソルシエ, Sayonara Sorushie) is a Japanese historical slice of life josei manga series written and illustrated by Hozumi. It was serialized in Shogakukan's Flowers manga magazine and was compiled in 2 volumes published in 2013. It tells the story of Theodorus van Gogh, an art dealer in late 19th-century Paris, who fights to promote innovative art and gain recognition for his brother Vincent's talent amidst a conservative art scene.

== Story ==
The original manga tells the story of the van Gogh brothers - the famous painter Vincent van Gogh, and his younger brother Theodorus van Gogh - but primarily from the point of view of his younger brother. Theo is employed as the branch manager of the famous art dealership Goupil & Cie. He seeks to embrace new talents and techniques, but the bourgeoisie mentality of the time deems the lower classes unable to appreciate fine art, marking it as a domain exclusive to high society. Theo struggles to showcase art that depicts the truth of the everyday.

== Characters ==
- Théodorus Van Gogh
- Vincent van Gogh
- Paul Gauguin
- Monsieur Baudrillard
- Jean Santro
- Jean Gérôme

== Volumes ==
- 1 (May 10, 2013)
- 2 (November 8, 2013)

== Musical ==
A stage musical adaptation took place at the Zepp Blue Theater in Roppongi, Tokyo, from March 17–21, 2016. Daisuke Nishida directed the production, and Shuhei Kamimura (Student Council's Discretion) composed the music.

Another stage play, featuring the same staff, ran at Tokyo's Theatre 1010 from March 17–20, 2017.

== Reception ==
Volume 2 reached the 32nd place on the weekly Oricon manga chart and, as of November 17, 2013, has sold 39,410 copies.

It was number 1 on the 2014 Kono Manga ga Sugoi! Top 20 Manga for Female Readers survey and was a runner-up on the top 50 manga on the 15th Book of the Year list by Da Vinci magazine.

== See also ==
- Shiki no Zenjitsu, another manga by the same author
