= Shiki no Zenjitsu =

Japanese manga

式の前日
- Genre: Romance
- Manga
- Written by: Hozumi
- Published by: Shogakukan
- Imprint: Flowers; Rinka
- Published: September 10, 2012
- Volumes: 1

Shiki no Zenjitsu (式の前日; lit. "Day Before the Ceremony") is a one-volume Japanese romance josei manga written and illustrated by Hozumi. It was serialized on Shogakukan's Flowers and Rinka manga magazines and the compiled volume was released on September 10, 2012.

== Reception ==
It reached the 48th place on the weekly Oricon manga chart and, as of February 10, 2013, has sold 273,496 copies.

It was number two on the 2013 Kono Manga ga Sugoi! Top 20 Manga for Female Readers survey. It was also number twelve on the Zenkoku Shotenin ga Eranda Osusume Comic 2013, a list of the top 15 recommended manga by Japanese bookstores.

== See also ==
- Sayonara Sorcier, another manga by the same author
