= Tokachi Hitoribocchi Nōen =

Japanese manga series

- First tankōbon volume cover

十勝ひとりぼっち農園
- Genre: Non-fiction
- Manga
- Written by: Yūji Yokoyama
- Published by: Shogakukan
- Imprint: Shōnen Sunday Comics Special
- Magazine: Weekly Shōnen Sunday
- Original run: November 29, 2017 – June 17, 2026
- Volumes: 20
- icon

Tokachi Hitoribocchi Nōen (十勝ひとりぼっち農園; lit. 'Tokachi Lonely Farm') is a Japanese non-fiction manga series written and illustrated by Yūji Yokoyama. It was serialized in Shogakukan's shōnen manga magazine Weekly Shōnen Sunday from November 2017 to June 2026.

== Synopsis ==
Manga artist Yūji Yokoyama relocated from Tokyo to Tokachi, Hokkaido, after Shogakukan's Weekly Shōnen Sunday editor-in-chief, Takenori Ichihara, suggested he "make the best curry in Japan". Yokoyama has since dedicated himself to establishing a farm in Tokachi and working hard to grow vegetables. He humorously chronicles his agricultural endeavors in his manga.

== Publication ==
Written and illustrated by Yūji Yokoyama, Tokachi Hitoribocchi Nōen was serialized in Shogakukan's shōnen manga magazine Weekly Shōnen Sunday from November 29, 2017, to June 17, 2026. Shogakukan has collected its chapters into 20 tankōbon volumes, released from April 12, 2019, to August 10, 2026.

=== Volumes ===
No.	Japanese release date	Japanese ISBN
1	April 12, 2019	978-4-09-129185-1
2	June 12, 2019	978-4-09-129266-7
3	August 8, 2019	978-4-09-129374-9
4	November 12, 2019	978-4-09-129498-2
5	April 10, 2020	978-4-09-850131-1
6	August 12, 2020	978-4-09-850236-3
7	December 11, 2020	978-4-09-850405-3
8	May 12, 2021	978-4-09-850583-8
9	October 12, 2021	978-4-09-850802-0
10	March 10, 2022	978-4-09-851088-7
11	September 12, 2022	978-4-09-851363-5
12	February 10, 2023	978-4-09-851641-4
13	August 9, 2023	978-4-09-852779-3
14	January 12, 2024	978-4-09-853080-9
15	July 11, 2024	978-4-09-853427-2
16	December 12, 2024	978-4-09-853738-9
17	May 12, 2025	978-4-09-854092-1
18	December 12, 2025	978-4-09-854345-8
19	April 10, 2026	978-4-09-854510-0
20	August 10, 2026	978-4-09-854715-9

== Reception ==
In May 2019, it was reported that the series' first volume was selling well at bookstores in Obihiro city and other places.
