= Lost+Brain =

Japanese manga series by Tsuzuku Yabuno and Akira Ōtani

- First tankōbon volume cover, featuring Ren Hiyama
- Genre: Psychological thriller
- Manga
- Written by: Tsuzuku Yabuno
- Illustrated by: Akira Ōtani
- Published by: Shogakukan
- Imprint: Shōnen Sunday Comics
- Magazine: Weekly Shōnen Sunday
- Original run: December 12, 2007 – July 2, 2008
- Volumes: 3
- icon

Lost+Brain is a Japanese manga series written by Tsuzuku Yabuno and illustrated by Akira Ōtani. It was serialized in Shogakukan's shōnen manga magazine Weekly Shōnen Sunday from December 2007 to July 2008, with its chapters collected in three tankōbon volumes.

== Plot ==
Ren Hiyama, a brilliant but disillusioned student, grows weary of the world's monotony. While contemplating how to reshape society, he recognizes hypnosis as a potential instrument for transformation. Following a year of experimentation on his classmates, he initiates his ambitious project to remake the world.

== Characters ==
Ren Hiyama (氷山 漣, Hiyama Ren)
A disillusioned student who perceives humanity as complacent and existentially unfulfilled. Believing both his own life and society to be devoid of meaning, he resolves to transform the world but initially lacks the means to do so. After witnessing a demonstration of hypnosis, he dedicates a year to mastering the technique, infiltrating various social circles to covertly test his abilities while cultivating a facade of self-improvement. Having completed his preparations, he initiates a scheme to manipulate global society into submitting to his authority.
Haruhide Shitara (設楽 晴秀, Shitara Haruhide)
A top-ranking student at Ren's school, he initially admires Ren's shared disdain for society but loses respect when Ren befriends those he considers inferior. Ren later reveals his apparent conformity masked hypnosis experiments on students, demonstrating its power by comparing it to an atomic bomb. Recognizing their shared goals, Ren recruits him as a necessary collaborator. Though intelligent, he often displays timidity and doubts Ren's methods until understanding the true aim: using hypnosis to eliminate human weakness. Convinced, he commits fully to Ren's cause.
Mizuki Sonoyama (園山 瑞希, Sonoyama Mizuki)
The second recruit to Ren's group, she endured years of bullying until confessing suicidal despair to Shitara. After receiving hypnotic treatment from both Shitara and Ren, she undergoes a dramatic transformation in appearance and confidence. Discovering their plans, she fully commits to their mission of perfecting humanity through hypnosis.
Itsuki Kuonji (九遠寺 一樹, Kuonji Itsuki)
A renowned hypnotist and Yuka Takagi's uncle, he showcases hypnosis' power by transforming timid individuals into confident performers. Investigating a bombing incident, he theorizes a "Third Party" used hypnosis to manipulate the perpetrator. Disgusted by this weaponization of his craft, he seeks the culprit but becomes targeted by Ren, who frames him by manipulating patients into suicide. Detained as the prime suspect, he loses his investigative authority as evidence mounts against him.
Yuka Takagi (高木 由香, Takagi Yuka)
As Student Council Vice President under Ren, she initially joins to pursue romance with him. After confessing and being rejected, she persists in her feelings and arranges for her hypnotist uncle to participate in school events. Unaware of Ren's true intentions, she willingly undergoes his hypnosis. Ren programs her mind with a lethal failsafe should anyone investigate his hypnotic control.

=== Hypnotism victims ===
Oosawa (大沢)
Ren's initial hypnosis test subject, Oosawa begins as a timid student who falsely accuses Ren of bullying. After Ren rejects his apology and hypnotizes him, Oosawa transforms into an outgoing participant in school clubs. Ren later manipulates this transformation to position Oosawa near Saeki, resulting in a fatal bombing incident.
Kenji Hotta (堀田 健治, Hotta Kenji)
One of Ren's guinea pigs and head of the Journalism Club. Ren has him commit suicide by falling off the building, while holding a suicide note stating that it was Itsuki behind Oosawa's suicide bombing. This being part of the plan to get Itsuki erased and off his trail.
Yuki Fujikawa (藤川 勇気, Fujikawa Yūki)
One of Ren's guinea pigs and Head of the Rock Club. Ren has him commit suicide by falling off the building to convince the police that the one after him (Itsuki) is the man behind the attack.
Keigo Kawashiba (河至場 敬悟, Kawashiba Keigo)
A patient of Itsuki Kuonji. Forced to commit suicide along with 10 other people to raise suspicion about Itsuki.
Ms. Onoda (小野田先生, Onoda-sensei)
A disillusioned new teacher at Ren's school develops an attraction to his mysterious persona. Ren hypnotizes her to create memory gaps while manipulating her into proposing a teacher-free student forum. After serving her purpose, he removes the hypnosis but expresses disdain for her complacency.
Saeki (冴木)
A politician that Ren has killed during the suicide bomb attack by Oosawa to signal the start of his plan to change the world.

== Publication ==
Written by Tsuzuku Yabuno and illustrated by Akira Ōtani, Lost+Brain was serialized in Shogakukan's shōnen manga magazine Weekly Shōnen Sunday from December 12, 2007, to July 2, 2008. (Note: The magazine's 31st issue of 2008 (cover date July 16) was published on July 2.) Shogakukan collected its 27 individual chapters into three tankōbon volumes, published from May 16 to August 11, 2008.

=== Volumes ===
No.	Release date	ISBN
1	May 16, 2008	978-4-09-121395-2
Sign.001. "Power that was Wanted" (求めていた力, Motometeita Chikara); Sign.002. "Hyponosis Power" (催眠の力, Saimin no Chikara); Sign.003. "The Third Man" (第三の人間, Daisan no Ningen); Sign.004. "Will" (遺書, Isho); Sign.005. "List of Patients" (患者リスト, Kanja Risuto); Sign.006. "Rock of Memory" (記憶のロック, Kioku no Rokku); Sign.007. "Conclusion of Plan" (計画の結末, Keikaku no Ketsumatsu)
2	July 18, 2008	978-4-09-121437-9
Sign.008. "What Changes..." (変えるものは…, Kaeru mo no Ha...); Sign.009. "Real Strength" (本当の強さ, Honto no Tsuyosa); Sign.010. "Place of Plan" (計画の舞台, Keikaku no Butai); Sign.011. "Another Hypnosis" (もうひとつの催眠, Mō Hitotsu no Saimin); Sign.012. "Group of Missing People" (集団失踪, Shūdan Shissō); Sign.013. "Parting Away" (決別, Ketsubetsu); Sign.014. "True Identity of Solution Hypnois" (解催眠の正体, Kaisaimin no Shōtai); Sign.015. "Perception of Emotional Depths"; Sign.016. "Mastermind"; Sign.017. "Contact"
3	August 11, 2008	978-4-09-121457-7
Sign.018. "Broadcasting Room"; Sign.019. "Activation"; Sign.020. "True Self"; Sign.021. "Recovery of Memory"; Sign.022. "Warning"; Sign.023. "Land of People"; Sign.024. "Rebirth"; Sign.025. "Symbol"; Sign.026. "Distorted World"; Sign.027. "After the End"

== Reception ==
When the manga debuted, many readers criticized its similarities to Death Note—particularly its protagonist, a disillusioned young man seeking to reshape the world, much like Death Note's Light Yagami. However, as the story progressed, it diverged into a unique narrative, focusing on the protagonist's use of hypnosis to reform people rather than destroy them.
