= List of Red River chapters =

First volume of the original Japanese release of Chie Shinohara's Red River manga series, released in Japan by Shogakukan on May 26, 1995

Written and illustrated by Chie Shinohara, Red River was serialized in the bimonthly manga anthology Shōjo Comic from January 5, 1995, to June 5, 2002, with its chapters collected and published by Shogakukan in 28 tankōbon volumes and later republished in 16 bunkobon volumes. The manga is licensed in North America by Viz Media.

== Volume list ==
No.	Original release date	Original ISBN	North America release date	North America ISBN
1	May 26, 1995	4-09-136501-9	May 26, 2004	978-1-59116-429-6
Chapters 1–3
Yuri Suzuki, a contemporary 15-year-old Japanese girl, is suddenly caught by hands that drag her into a water puddle. She emerges from a spring in 14th century B.C.E. Hattusa, capital of the Hittite Empire, in the region known today as Anatolia in central Turkey, to serve as a key element in a curse by the dread queen Nakia. She is rescued by Prince Kail Mursili, who saves her from sacrifice by falsely claiming that he had previously taken her virginity. He later consents to her wish to return her home—but her 20th century clothes, necessary for her return, are in Nakia's hands. As Yuri tries to retrieve them with the help of a young palace servant named Tito, she walks straight into a deadly trap.
2	August 21, 1995	4-09-136502-7	August 31, 2004	978-1-59116-430-2
Chapters 4–7
Yuri barely escapes Nakia's clutches, but Tito falls prey to her sadistic servant Zuwa, leader of the Kashuga, who are now attacking Tito's own tribe. And Nakia does not grant Yuri any respite; she sends her confidant, Urhi, to Tito's family to tell them that Tito was murdered by Yuri. Tito's sisters are bent on avenging their younger brother's death, unaware that they are only playing right into Nakia's hands.
3	November 25, 1995	4-09-136503-5	November 10, 2004	978-1-59116-431-9
Chapters 8-10
Yuri manages to prove her innocence by killing Zuwa, and Tito's father surrenders the secret of iron-forging to her as a sign of his gratitude. But another crisis begins to shake Anatolia: the neighboring Mitanni under the leadership of Crown Prince Mattiwaza launch a full-scale war upon the Hittites. In the midst of war preparations, Nakia enslaves Kail's brother, Prince Zannanza Hattusili, with her magic to abduct Yuri and spark a crisis at the royal court. But unexpectedly, Yuri and Zannanza find themselves right in the thick of the Mitanni invasion.
4	March 26, 1996	4-09-136504-3	January 11, 2005	978-1-59116-432-6
Chapters 11-12
Yuri, Kail and Zannanza manage to avert the Mitanni invasion and the queen's scheme for the moment, but soon the Mitanni strike again. Kail moves out with his army, but does not meet Prince Mattizawa in open battle. Instead he devises a cunning plan to retake an occupied city with as little bloodshed as possible.
5	June 26, 1996	4-09-136505-1	March 8, 2005	978-1-59116-433-3
Chapters 13-14; Illustration Gallery
Malatia is easily retaken, but in the midst of battle Yuri is knocked out by Urhi and subsequently captured by the Mitanni. Mattizawa soon learns of the fact that the incarnation of Ishtar is among the prisoners and tries to break the Hittites' moral by proving that Yuri is a false goddess. But the plan backfires when Yuri manages to convince the Mitanni people of her strong spirit and sincerity.
6	September 26, 1996	4-09-136506-X	May 10, 2005	978-1-59116-780-8
Chapters 15-16
Imprisoned in Mattizawa's harem, Yuri, Ryui, and Shala begin to execute a plan which would allow Prince Kail to take the Mitanni capital with a minimum use of force. But as Yuri also takes to taking care of the sick and dying in the so-called House of Rest, she slowly begins to arouse Mattizawa's interest.
7	November 26, 1996	4-09-136507-8	July 12, 2005	978-1-59116-847-8
Chapters 17-19; Gallery Illustration
The war against Mitanni ends with victory for the Hittites, and Yuri is reunited with Kail. But soon news of Tutankhamen's death reach the Hittite royal court: his widow Ankhesenamen announces her intent to marry a Hittite prince. Nakia of course tries to put Kail forward as the best possible choice, but in the end Zannanza is elected. But on their way to Egypt, Zannanza, Yuri, and their entourage fall prey to a band of Nakia's hired assassins.
8	February 26, 1997	4-09-136508-6	September 6, 2005	978-1-59116-988-8
Chapters 20-21
As the sole survivor of the assassination attempt, Yuri just manages to return to Kail in order to stop a war between Anatolia and Egypt, with the help of an Egyptian troop commander named User Ramses, who soon displays a strong interest in Yuri. Right afterwards, however, King Suppiluliuma's death by the Seven Day Fever and the coronation of Crown Prince Arnuwanda starts a silent battle for the royal succession between Kail and Nakia. And Nakia does not stop from using yet another heinous scheme to accomplish her goals: While she tries to endear herself to the populace at large, she uses a fake Ishtar to destroy Kail's standing in the people's eyes. Upon learning of this, Yuri sets out for Katapa to expose the fraud.
9	May 26, 1997	4-09-136509-4	November 8, 2005	978-1-4215-0066-9
Chapter 22-24
In Katapa, Yuri manages to win the people's heart by selflessly taking care of the sick; her standing is further increased by the fact that, because of her 20th century immunizations, she is unaffected by the Seven Day Fever. Subsequently, Kail is announced heir to the throne. But then Güzel, daughter of the Senate chairman and a former lover of Kail's, appears with a young son, claiming that the boy is Kail's child.
10	August 22, 1997	4-09-136510-8	January 10, 2006	978-1-4215-0195-6
Chapter 25-27; Illustration Gallery
It soon turns out that Güzel's claims are part of a carefully prepared trap by Nakia's devising, but the realization comes too late: King Arnuwanda is assassinated by Urhi, and Yuri is blamed for his murder. Tito's tribe, the Hatti, provide her a temporary refuge, and Kail manages to prove to the senate that Güzel's claims are false, but Nakia relentlessly sends Urhi and her private army to have Yuri killed as a scapegoat.
11	November 26, 1997	4-09-137381-X	March 14, 2006	978-1-4215-0327-1
Chapters 28-30; Gallery Illustration
Yuri narrowly escapes Nakia's troops, only to fall into the clutches of Ramses, who announces his intention to take her to Egypt to become his future queen. Crippled by his inability to help her without triggering a civil war, Kail falls into despair. Ursula, troubled that she had been duped by Nakia, decides to sacrifice her life for Yuri's sake.
12	February 24, 1998	4-09-137382-8	May 9, 2006	978-1-4215-0554-1
Chapters 31-33
Urhi eludes capture by throwing himself into the Red River, and Kail returns to Hattusa to be crowned king. However, Yuri refuses to get further involved with him, feeling resentful about Ursula's death and trying to get rid of her own growing love for Kail. But then war breaks out: the realms of Arzawa to the west and Egypt to the south invade Anatolia at the same time, and there is strong evidence that Nakia is supporting both sides with information. In the face of this dilemma, Yuri volunteers to lead part of the Hittite army against Arzawa while Kail is to engage the Egyptians.
13	May 26, 1998	4-09-137383-6	July 11, 2006	978-1-4215-0555-8
Chapters 34-36; Illustration Gallery
Yuri subdues Arzawa as bloodless as possible and gains herself a new friend, but then Nakia's true intention behind the war comes to light: she intends to use Kail's and Yuri's absence to destroy the spring from which Yuri had emerged—and Yuri needs all seven of Hattusa's springs intact to return to her own time. But as Yuri hastens back to the capital, an ill omen befalls her as Kail is wounded in battle by Ramses.
14	August 22, 1998	4-09-137384-4	September 12, 2006	978-1-4215-0556-5
Chapter 37-39
Faced with two difficult choices, Yuri decides to follow her heart: she permanently forsakes her last chance to return to the 20th century and rushes to save her true love, Kail. They consummate their relationship, and Kail announces to his servants that he will make Yuri his only queen. But Nakia has prepared another unpleasant surprise: she has seven princesses and several concubines as electable choices for Kail's sergalio waiting. Immediately, Yuri finds herself the target of vicious bullying by most of the princesses.
15	November 26, 1998	4-09-137385-2	November 14, 2006	978-1-4215-0557-2
Chapters 40-42
Yuri puts a determined end to the bullying when one "prank" eventually goes too far. But Nakia again gives her no rest: she sends her enchanted "black water" to two persons in the palace, one who hates Yuri and one who loves her. And soon a series of murders among the princess candidates and Yuri's subsequent disappearance rack the royal court's integrity.
16	March 26, 1999	4-09-137386-0	January 9, 2007	978-1-4215-0558-9
Chapters 43-45
Knowing that Nakia and Urhi are behind Yuri's disappearance, Kail sets an equally vicious ultimatum to Nakia: if Yuri does not return safe and unharmed, Nakia will be sacrificed to appease the gods. Yuri reappears to the public in an apparent miracle and is praised by the people as the next Tawananna, and soon afterward Kail announces to the Hittite Senate that he wishes to make Yuri his queen. While the Senate is divided on the issue, Nakia unexpectedly adds her support, but with a condition: Yuri must first prove her worth by taking over the post of Gal Mashedi, commander-in-chief of the Hittite armies, and defeat Egypt in the battle sure to come.
17	June 26, 1999	4-09-137387-9	April 10, 2007	978-1-4215-0997-6
Chapters 46-48
As Kail escorts one of the surviving princesses to her home, Nakia executes a plot against Rusafa, Yuri's newly-appointed second-in-command; by having him accused of rape, she has him sentenced to slow death by exposure. Yuri, however, with some quick thinking, manages to provide him with the means to escape this deathtrap. Soon after, word arrives from Karkemish: Kail's brother, Mali Piyasili, has gone missing during his mission to reinforce the frontline forces in Ugarit. Kail sends Yuri and her troops to investigate. What they find is another proof of Nakia's far-reaching and vicious treachery, and to add to the problems, the Egyptians are moving in again, led by none other than Ramses himself.
18	September 25, 1999	4-09-137388-7	July 10, 2007	978-1-4215-0998-3
Chapters 49-50; Illustration Gallery
Yuri devises a scheme which is to cripple the Egyptians' mobility, but Ramses quickly discovers her. As they struggle, however, they have to find out that Yuri is pregnant. Kail is quick to announce that this must be kept secret, lest Nakia would strike at Yuri once more; but due to an unintentional indiscretion the news quickly spread. In order to protect Yuri and his child from Nakia's plotting, Kail has them travel to Karkemish by sea. Unfortunately, the enemy does not rest ...
19	December 14, 1999	4-09-137389-5	October 9, 2007	978-1-4215-0999-0
Chapters 51-52
A saboteur strikes in the middle of the voyage, sinking the ship Yuri is on, and Yuri and Rusafa are left to the mercy of the sea. They are eventually picked up by an Egyptian military transport ship. Desperately worried about Yuri, who has gone ill, Rusafa asks the Egyptians to contact Ramses so he can help Yuri; but due to the soldier's uncaring attitude, Ramses arrives too late to save the child, though Yuri survives. And of course, Ramses has no intention to let his prize go; one day, he takes Yuri upon the deck of the ship they are travelling on to show her the shores of Egypt.
20	March 25, 2000	4-09-137390-9	January 8, 2008	978-1-4215-1000-2
Chapters 53-56
Ramses takes Yuri and Rusafa to his residence in Memphis, which he shares with his large flock of sisters. On the journey, however, Yuri remains listless and apathetic over the loss of her child, and only the startling revelation that there may be a traitor in Kail's inner circle of servants rouses her back to life. With Ramses' help Yuri and Rusafa learn that the Egyptian dowager queen Nefretiti seems to be conspiring with Nakia for the downfall of the Hittite empire, and Rusafa returns with the news to Kail. The traitor is soon rooted out, and in cold determination Kail decides to have Nakia finally ousted for treachery against the Hittite empire.
21	June 26, 2000	4-09-138021-2	April 8, 2008	978-1-4215-1001-9
Chapters 57-60
Presented as Ramses' fiancee, Yuri becomes a witness to the mutual enmity between Ramses and Nefertiti, who uses a charitable act by Yuri as a pretense to arrest the Egyptian general. Despite the pain Ramses has given her in the past, Yuri does not want to leave him in Nefertiti's clutches, and with her loyal retainers she travels to the Egyptian provinces and stirs up a rebellion, in the hopes that Ramses, the only truly capable commander of the Egyptian forces, will be released to face this crisis.
22	October 26, 2000	4-09-138022-0	July 8, 2008	978-1-4215-1722-3
Chapters 61-66
The rebels begin storming Nefertiti's palace, but Nefertiti is still prepared to murder Ramses out of stubborn pride. Yuri arrives in the nick of time to stop her, only to find her not to be the girl her brother Mattizawa had once loved. Ramses helps Yuri to find evidence of Nakia's treachery, and Yuri returns to Kail—only to find him apparently lifeless.
23	February 24, 2001	4-09-138023-9	October 14, 2008	978-1-4215-1723-0
Chapters 67-72
Yuri and Kail are reunited and find solace in each other's arms, but again trouble is drawing near: the Egyptian army under Horemheb is moving against the Hittites in full force. As allies gather under Yuri and Kail's guidance, Nakia is also moving to intercept the incriminating missive Yuri has recovered from Egypt. And the battle becomes a day of reckoning in more than one sense...
24	May 26, 2001	4-09-138024-7	January 13, 2009	978-1-4215-1724-7
Chapters 73-78
Kail and Ramses desert the war between the Hittite Empire and Egypt to settle old scores, forcing Yuri to take command of the Hittite army. By engineering the defeat of the Egyptians, she gains the confidence of the Hittite forces, who declare her to be their Tawananna. Kail and Ramses engage in a heated unarmed battle, but Kail is eventually able to rein in his emotions and return to the battlefield, proving to Ramses that he is the superior leader. Ramses accepts defeat and bids Yuri farewell forever; his final request to her is that she bear Kail a daughter to marry his future son.
25	August 23, 2001	4-09-138025-5	April 14, 2009	978-1-4215-2251-7
Chapters 79-84
Ilbani frees Prince Juda from his mother's mind control, and also lures Urhi into a carefully prepared trap and captures him. Faced with the sum of Nakia's crimes, Juda attempts to stop his mother's schemes in the only way he can think of: by committing suicide.
26	December 20, 2001	4-09-138026-3	July 14, 2009	978-1-4215-2252-4
Chapters 85-89
Before he is forced to give testimony to Nakia's treachery, Urhi kills himself, but not without giving Nakia some cryptic clue. Escaping from custody, she follows the message to Urhi's parting gift: Yuri's 20th century clothes. In a final attempt to get rid of Yuri, Nakia prepares a ceremony which is meant to eliminate her as she and Kail participate in a ritual cleansing; by having Yuri's clothes sucked into a whirlpool Nakia creates with her magic, Yuri is to be taken away from Anatolia, with unknown destination ...
27	March 23, 2002	4-09-138038-7	October 13, 2009	978-1-4215-2253-1
Chapters 90-95
Nakia's desperate last strike is barely foiled by the combined efforts of Kail, Prince Juda and Rusafa, who makes the ultimate sacrifice for the woman he loves. Nakia is finally judged by court and sentenced to life-long banishment in Karkemish under her son's supervision, and Yuri promises Rusafa to make good of her role as Tawananna. That very night, Kail formally asks Yuri for her hand in marriage.
28	July 26, 2002	4-09-138027-1	January 12, 2010	978-1-4215-2254-8
Chapters 96; Extra
The first section of this volume concludes the main story with the combined wedding/crowning ceremony during which Yuri ascends to Tawananna and the revelation that Yuri is yet again pregnant, a short overview by the author about the collapse of the Hittite empire about 150 years later (the specific causes are left open), concluding with a panoramic view over today's Anatolia and the remains of Hattusa. This is followed by three related short stories: "Kikkuri no Ichinichi" (Kikkuri's Day): A view of a day in the life of Kikkuri and his extensive—and extended—family, and his profession as a royal horse trainer.; "Cappadocia Kitan": During a trip in the fairy chimney region of Cappadocia, Queen Yuri encounters and takes in a young girl named Toui, the last of the Yusura tribe.; "Orontes Renka" (lit. 'Orontes Love Song'): This story takes place during the historical conclusion of the Hittite-Egyptian peace treaty between Hattusili III and Ramesses II in 1258 BC. Yuri Naptera, Yuri and Kail's granddaughter, who is to marry Ramses II in order to complete the treaty, falls in love with Maripas, the (in real history unnamed) 27th son of the pharaoh.
