= First Girl =

Romance manga series

ファースト・ガール
- Genre: Adventure, Romance
- Manga
- Written by: Chiho Saito
- Published by: Shogakukan
- Magazine: Petit Comic
- Original run: 2002 – 2003
- Volumes: 5

First Girl (ファースト・ガール) is a josei romance manga series written and illustrated by Chiho Saito. It was serialized by Shogakukan in Petit Comic in 2002 and 2003, and collected in five bound volumes under the Flower Comics imprint. It is licensed in Italian by Star Comics, which serialized it in the magazine Kappa Extra.

== Story ==
The story is about Miu, a seventeen-year-old Japanese girl who is sold by her mother to the handsome Leon Rosas, the son of a powerful family of a South American country, in order to get out of debt. She is taken to South America as Leon's bride to be and is terrified of being in a new country and owned by Leon. However Leon is able to seduce Miu and they fall in love. Tragedy strikes when a coup is taken out on the Rosas family, and every member of the family is killed in a massacre. Leon is the only one who survives as he was showing Miu a field of blue roses. Upon discovering this they evade the army for the time being along with a pastor who marries them.

Later on, Leon is apparently killed in a stand off against the rebels which breaks Miu's heart. She then encounters Juan Ortes, the commander of the rebels. Miu believes he is responsible for Leon's death and escapes his camp. While the revolutionists break out, Miu seeks refuge in Madame Marianna's tango shop.

After spending sometime at Marianna's, the shop is eventually raided by Captain Carlos Ricardo (now called General Shilbas) who was rejected by Marianna some years back before the story. Meanwhile, Juan Ortes shows signs of interests in Miu not as enemy but out of attraction toward her. During the raid Ricardo and Miu instantly become enemies. Marianna is injured in the attack and in an effort to raise her spirits Miu organizes for the town to trade goods on a boat. This however is short-lived by another raid by Ricardo. The civilians fight back and Miu travels with them on the boat before it is raided again by the army.

Miu is captured and forced to dance with Ricardo as symbol of political importance to him, and Juan is sentenced to death. However both Miu and Juan escape during a blackout and it is revealed that Leon may still be alive. Shilbas has become enamored of Miu and desires to make her his woman.

After their escape Miu insists on going back to the town only to discover Marianna's hung corpse after a bloody massacre. Shunned and blamed by the town for this Miu is forced to escape with Juan through the jungle until they reach his village. Due to Juan's background the village is unhelpful to them and only one an old friend secretly aides them. During this time Juan is obviously in love with Miu but he is rejected by her. The army eventually catches up and shoots Juan who falls to his death. Whilst the chaos ensues, Miu is rescued by a helicopter and placed on a boat to America. On the boat she is at last reunited with her husband Leon. However, due to Ricardo's suspicions about Leon's survival, Miu realizes she is going to New York and will be separated from Leon for the time being.

Upon her arrival in New York she accidentally gets involved with some gangsters. This is soon resolved however Miu is left in a tough position with only Isaac Prince to turn to, a renowned choreographer and master of tango. Isaac sees Miu as a sort of muse but also pursues her romantically. As they perform, he tries to convince her that Leon could not have survived or else does not want her, and eventually gets her to sleep with him. Not long afterward though, Leon reappears in New York, as does Shilbas; in pursuit of them both. Leon forgives Miu for sleeping with Isaac, and the two of them go on the run again, this time back to Japan.

Miu goes into hiding with her family, while Leon goes out to network help. It is revealed that her mother, who is now dating a new man; used to go to Tornadia to visit her sister (she was married to Leon's uncle) and had known Leon for very long, and had realized that Leon had fallen for Miu at first sight and would love and take care of her well.

It is also revealed that Miu's high school aged brother (they're not blood related), is also in love with her. Being in close proximity to her but having her in love with someone else is maddening to him; and he tries to break Miu and Leon up by questioning what Leon is doing while he's left her alone. Miu, however; has perfect faith in Leon and is saved by him after her brother takes drugs and while in that state, tries to force himself on her.

Unfortunately, while her mother's beau is a good man, he is also a spy and turns Leon and Miu's whereabouts over to Shilbas. There is a lot of running around and chasing that culminates in their capture. Leon is shot and injured and Miu is forced to accompany Shilbas to a party proving his power, after which he intends to force her to wed him. Shilbas forces Miu to tango in front of the injured Leon, keeping a promise he made to let her see him one last time. He also grants Leon's request to dance with Miu one last time, before he is to be shot on the lawn. The pair captivate the crowd, and Miu demands she be shot along with Leon. As they say goodbye to each other, the firing squad never appears. Rather, Juan Ortes, who was saved from death by his village, appears; having executed an overthrow of the military regime with Leon's help. Shilbas is captured, but Leon refuses to kill him, even after Juan encourages him to do so. He instead turns him over to the people, and declares that Tornadia will become a democracy and he will remove himself from the political process. Miu and Leon retire to his estate while Juan Ortes is elected president. It is heavily implied however, that Leon will be elected as soon as he shows himself again, making Miu the first lady.

== Characters ==
Satsuki Miu was sold by her mother to Leon Rosas, son of a powerful family of a South American country, to get out of debt. Miu was at first scared of Leon, however, eventually she opened up to him and they fall in love. While Leon's family was holding a birthday party for Leon's grandfather, the whole Rosas family was massacred, except for Leon, who had been away with Miu.

Leon Rosas, the son of a powerful family of a South American country. Married to Miu, a Japanese girl who was sold out by her mother. A way for Miu to identify him is his strong cologne. It is, at one point, used against her.

== Manga ==
| No. | Release date | ISBN |
|---|---|---|
| 1 | 25 May 2002 | 4-09-132184-4 |
| 2 | 26 October 2002 | 4-09-132185-2 |
| 3 | 26 March 2003 | 4-09-132186-0 |
| 4 | 23 October 2003 | 4-09-132187-9 |
| 5 | 26 January 2004 | 4-09-132188-7 |
