= Kanon (manga) =

Japanese manga series

- First volume of Kanon published by Shogakukan on October 26, 1995

花音
- Genre: Drama
- Manga
- Written by: Chiho Saito
- Published by: Shogakukan
- Magazine: Petit Comic
- Original run: 1995 – 1997
- Volumes: 6

Kanon (花音, Kanon) is a Japanese music manga written and illustrated by Chiho Saito. It was serialised by Shogakukan in Petit Comic from 1995 to 1997 and collected in six bound volumes. Kanon received the 1997 Shogakukan Manga Award for shōjo manga.

== Plot ==
A pregnant Japanese photographer travels to Mongolia and ends up staying there. Eighteen years later, Yuko runs a hotel with the help of her daughter, Kanon, who shows great talent with the violin. Following an accident, a dying Yuko reveals that Kanon's father is alive and that she has inherited his musical gift. Hotel guest Tendo Kawahara comes to Kanon's aid. She moves into Tendo's apartment in Japan and attends classes arranged by him. He decides that the person most fitting to guide Kanon is Gen Mikami, an arrogant conductor. Mikami is also head of a music school, and Kanon is enrolled there.

Yuko's sister lets her niece know about the three men she believes are most likely to be her father: violinist Koki Sawa, pianist Sachio Kajiwara, and conductor Kent Gregory. Kanon eventually finds out that Koki is dead and that his wife was his only love. Sachio has no interest in women. Kent, the last candidate, immediately tells Kanon she is his child. A happy time ensues.

All through the search for her father, Kanon has grown closer to Mikami. She confesses her love and he lies, saying he is only interested in her talent. A short time after Kanon's first meeting with Kent, Mikami sees a picture of Yuko and realizes she's the woman he fell in love with when he was still a teenager. After their first night together, she disappeared from his life.

Kent hides from Kanon that he is ill and only has a short time left to live. After collapsing during a performance, he admits in a letter that Kanon is not his daughter. Having loved Yuko, he thought that he and Kanon brightening each other's life would be a good idea. He also writes that a pregnant Yuko told him that the baby's father played a Guadagnini.

Following Kent's death, the letter falls into Tendo's hands. He realizes that Mikami is Kanon's father. Meanwhile, Kanon and Mikami have sex for the first time. Finding out the truth leads Mikami to end their relationship, despite that not being Kanon's wish. Deeply upset, she exchanges an expensive ring for an airplane ticket to Thailand. Tendo finds her, and from there, they go to Mongolia, Kanon's home country, where she remembers her love for music.

Years later, Kanon and Mikami see each other again. Regardless of what they know, she still wants them to be in a romantic relationship. He says that their relationship can only exist in the realm of music, a notion she rejects. Later, playing a piece of Mikami's while he conducts, Kanon realizes the truth in his words: during the emotional performance, he is neither her lover nor her father, but something else. They hug on the stage. That same evening, Kanon goes to find Tendo, who has always loved her.

== Manga ==
Written and illustrated by Chiho Saito, Kanon was serialised by Shogakukan in the josei manga magazine Petit Comic from 1995 to 1997. The serial chapters were collected in six tankōbon volumes under the Flower Comics imprint. In 2003, Flower Comics re-released the manga in three bunkoban volumes.
