= Happy Marriage!? =

Japanese manga series

- Cover of the first manga volume

はぴまり〜Happy Marriage!?〜 (Hapimari ~Happī Marijji?~)
- Genre: Comedy; Drama; Romance
- Manga
- Written by: Maki Enjōji
- Published by: Shogakukan
- English publisher: Viz Media
- Magazine: Petit Comic
- Original run: June 2009 – September 2012
- Volumes: 10
- Television drama

Hapimari: Happy Marriage!?
- Directed by: Ryō Miyawaki; Kentarō Ōtani
- Written by: Taeko Asano
- Original run: June 22, 2016 – August 31, 2016
- Episodes: 12

Happy Marriage!? (Japanese: はぴまり〜Happy Marriage!?〜, Hepburn: Hapimari ~Happī Marijji?~) is a Japanese manga series written and illustrated by Maki Enjōji. It began serialization in Shogakukan's josei magazine Petit Comic on June 14, 2009, and ran until September 23, 2012. It is completed in 10 volumes. It has been published in French by Kazé and in German by Tokyopop. Viz Media has licensed the English version, which was released on August 6, 2013.

A live-action drama based on the series premiered on Amazon Prime Video in June 2016.

== Plot ==
Takanashi Chiwa is an office lady who works part-time at a night club because she is in debt and has no other source of income. One day, she gets into a little rude exchange of a quarrel with an affluent and handsome customer who came to the club and as a result of her quarrel is fired and loses her job. The next day, a depressed and pessimistic Chiwa is summoned by her boss from the night club to resolve the issue and finds the obnoxious, wealthy man from the day before down at the club. Turns out his name is Mamiya Hokuto. Suddenly, Hokuto proposes a contract marriage with Chiwa which includes her earning a huge sum of money which could possibly replace her night club job earnings and pay all her debts. Though the idea seems too good to be true and she is initially resistant to the idea due to her previous unpleasant exchange, she has no choice but to accept it or else she will have no source of income. However, the real question is, will the two of them overcome all sorts of troubles? And perhaps will true love maybe come to play?

== Characters ==
=== Main characters ===
Chiwa Takanashi/Chiwa Mamiya/Chiwa Miura (間宮 千和, Mamiya Chiwa)
Played by: Nana Seino
Her maiden name is Takanashi, is an average 23-year-old office-lady, who works full-time in the Mamiya Company and part-time as a hostess in order to pay off her father's debt from his failed business. Her mother abandoned the family after her father's business failed. She attended university but was forced to drop out after her first year to help with her father's debts. Although she had one boyfriend who dumped her when she was in the university, she never had the time nor the opportunity to have a boyfriend in her entire life, so she has never gone beyond kissing a man. She first met Hokuto at the club she worked at and lashed out at him after he insulted her, leading her to get fired. She was later shocked to learn Hokuto was the president of Mamiya Company. The Chairman of Mamiya was in love with her late grandmother, so he decides to pay off Chiwa's debt to honor her memory on the condition that she marries his grandson Hokuto. She refused at first because it was a loveless marriage, but she ultimately relents. Over the course of their marriage, they endure obstacles of former suitors, jealous business rivals, and the mysteries surrounding the Mamiya family. However, Chiwa ends up falling in love with Hokuto after realizing that he truly does care about her and their marriage, so much so that she loses her virginity to him. However, she struggles to understand him, due to his guarded attitude towards his feelings and past. Half-way through the series, she transfers to Shingo's company, which is next door to Mamiya Company. Once she learns that Hokuto became the company president to learn the truth behind his mother's death, she becomes determined to find out the Mamiya family secrets as well on Hokuto's behalf, even though she learns that she is putting her life at risk. At the end of the series, at Hokuto's request to sort out his family and business matters, they mutually divorce after 3 years of marriage. They later remarry and have a formal wedding and reception, and they learn that Chiwa may be pregnant with their first child.
Hokuto Mamiya/Hokuto Miura (間宮 北斗, Mamiya Hokuto)
Played by: Dean Fujioka
He is a shrewd and capable 28-year-old businessman. He agrees to marry Chiwa for personal reasons that have to do with his past, and he convinces her to keep their marriage a secret. As a company president, he is used to living by himself, and behaves quite selfishly and authoritarian. With Chiwa, he will display a curious facet of a tyrannical-devoted-sadistic-charming husband. Although he falls deeply in love with Chiwa, he doesn't know how to show his feelings for her and is sometimes embarrassed by her. Although he takes pleasure in teasing her, he never tolerates anyone insulting or harming her, even though he has hit her twice. He also gets jealous when he sees her with another male and is displeased when he learns he wasn't her first kiss. Before meeting Chiwa, Hokuto was not interested in marriage or having a family, but after marrying her, he started to like the idea of having children with her. It is later revealed that his mother died in a car accident and his father, Seiji, took custody of him afterwards, but as an illegitimate child, he was unwelcomed by the majority of the Mamiya family, who suspected that Hokuto wasn't Seiji's biological son. Suspecting someone inside the family was responsible for his mother's death, he rose to the position of the company president. As he gets closer to the truth, he unwittingly puts Chiwa in harm's way, which forces him to briefly separate from her. Once he learns the truth, including that he was indeed never Seiji's child, he disowns the Mamiya family name, but to settle his family and business matters, he requests a divorce from Chiwa, which she reluctantly agrees. After several months, he announces to Chiwa that he has transferred out of the Mamiya family register and changed his last name back to Miura, and asks Chiwa to remarry him. Since he is no longer a company president, he starts a new business. This time, he and Chiwa have a formal wedding and reception, but it is halted when they learn that Chiwa may be pregnant with their first child.

=== Supporting characters ===
Taeko Souma (相馬 妙子, Sōma Taeko)
Played by: Norika Fujiwara
She is the efficient secretary attached to the president. She looks younger than she really is, and Chiwa was shocked when Hokuto told her that Taeko is already 55. In the beginning, Chiwa was a little jealous of Taeko's close relationship with Hokuto, viewing them as a more suitable couple. This is later sorted out when Taeko informs her that she's known Hokuto since he was a child and treats him like family. Hokuto entrusts her with the mission of keeping watch on his wife, but she will actually help them both to know each other better. She tries to help remind Hokuto of what is most important in his life and to help keep his and Chiwa's marriage working. She later attends Chiwa and Hokuto's wedding.
Yu Yagami (八神 裕, Yagami Yū)
Played by: Jun Shirasu
He is a new worker of Mamiya who is being tutored by Chiwa. He falls in love with her, so Hokuto transfers him to the North. He returns in the last chapter to attend Chiwa and Hokuto's wedding and was shocked to learn the reason why he was transferred.
Shingo Sakuraba (桜庭 真吾, Sakuraba Shingo)
He is a former classmate (senpai) of Chiwa. He is currently the board director of the company I-Max, which has a business relationship with Mamiya. He asks Chiwa to quit her husband's company and work with him. Chiwa initially agrees, thinking it was best to get away from Hokuto, but Hokuto refused and Shingo decided against forcing Chiwa to choose between them. He is one of the first people to know the secret of the Mamiyas being married and agrees to keep it a secret on Chiwa's behalf until they are ready to make it publicly known. Later, after the marriage is revealed, Chiwa does transfer to Shingo's company, this time with Hokuto's consent. He cares deeply for Chiwa and always looks out for her. He later attends Chiwa and Hokuto's wedding and is the one who suggests that Chiwa is pregnant when she gets sick at the reception.
Kaname Asahina (朝比奈 要, Asahina Kaname)
He is a former classmate (senpai) and ex-boyfriend of Chiwa. He is Sakuraba's partner in I-Max and becomes Chiwa's boss. Although Hokuto is jealous of Kaname's previous relationship with Chiwa, he trusts him enough to let Chiwa work with him after she transfers. He also knows the secret of Chiwa and Hokuto being married and later attends their wedding.
Mamiya Chairman (間宮会長, Kaichō)
He is the chairman of Mamiya Enterprises and the head of the family. He strangely picked up Hokuto over his other grandson, Satoru, as the company president, despite the fact that Satoru was the son of his first-born child and Hokuto was the illegitimate son of his second child, Seiji. This led to extreme estrangement and jealousy among the Mamiya family, which only worsened after Hokuto married Chiwa. The chairmen is fond of Chiwa and reveals that he was once in love with her grandmother, and he wanted to honor her memory by having Chiwa wed Hokuto, as well as help with her father's debts. He was visibly saddened upon learning that Hokuto was not his biological grandson, but said to Hokuto that he was still part of the family and thanked him for everything. He later attends Hokuto and Chiwa's wedding.
Seiji Mamiya (間宮 征司, Mamiya Seiji)
Played by: Ginnojō Yamazaki
He is Hokuto's father and he is the second son of the chairman. He is a sharp and intelligent businessman. From initial reports, he was briefly involved with Hokuto's mother and left before Hokuto was born. He suddenly returned to meet Hokuto when he was 10, but Hokuto and his mother rejected him. After Hokuto's mother died in a car accident, Seiji took custody of him, but Hokuto recalls no closeness between father and son during his upbringing. In fact, Hokuto blames him for his mother's death. Once Hokuto grew up and became the company president, he cut off all contact with his father, but was suddenly thrust back to his father once Chiwa started learning the secrets within the family. Throughout the manga, Seiji is in the hospital and slowly dying from an illness, and Hokuto refuses to see him. However, before he dies, father and son are able to reconcile and it was shown that Seiji always loved his son. After his death, members of the Mamiya family revealed medical records that showed Seiji was incapable of having children and, therefore, Hokuto is not a blood member of the family, and that Seiji passed himself off as Hokuto's father out of love for his mother.
Yoko Miura (三浦 蓉子, Miura Yokō)
She is Hokuto's mother and Seiji's former mistress. After breaking up with her lover, she has Hokuto and raises him alone, and never disclosed to him the identity of his father. When Seiji reappeared in her life and claimed to be Hokuto's father, she rejected him. Despite this, he still followed her and Hokuto wherever they went. She died after getting hit by a car while trying to save her son from being struck. Years later, Hokuto would learn that the wife of chairman's eldest son, with other relatives involved, ordered her and Hokuto to be killed to protect Satoru's claim to the company.
Kiyohiko Mamiya (間宮 清彦, Mamiya Kiyohiko)
Hokuto's cousin. Kiyohiko holds a grudge against Hokuto for being appointed president of the family business despite being an illegitimate child. Because of his hatred, Kiyohiko started to harass Hokuto and Chiwa. and for that reason the chairman sent him to South America. He would be among the relatives to reveal the truth about his past and parentage in an attempt to drive Hokuto away from the family.
Satoru Mamiya (間宮 理, Mamiya Satoru)
Played by: Yoshimasa Kondo
Hokuto's cousin. Satoru is the son of the chairman's first-born child. Despite the family quarreling over who deserves to be the company president and resenting Hokuto for being an illegitimate child, he and Hokuto get along quite well. He also has a close bond with Chiwa and is one of the few relatives to warmly welcome her into the family. His wife, Saori, is a perfect housewife and they have a child together. When it is eventually revealed that his mother arranged the murder, he and his wife are both left in shock and feel incredible shame knowing their family went to that extreme. Their shame was so great that Satoru would not see Hokuto after the events were revealed.

== Media ==
=== Manga ===
The series began publication in Japan in Petit Comic, a magazine by the publisher Shogakukan. The first collected volume (tankōbon) was released by Shogakukan in June 2009, and the series concluded in September 2012 with a total of 10 volumes.

Viz Media licensed the manga for an English release in February 2013, releasing the first volume on August 6, 2013.

In France, the manga was licensed by Kazé, who released the manga from September 16, 2010, to December 5, 2012.

In Poland, the manga was released by Studio JG.

Volume	Japanese release date	Japanese ISBN	English release date	English ISBN
1	June 10, 2009	978-4-09-132470-2	August 6, 2013	978-1-4215-5934-6
2	October 9, 2009	978-4-09-132838-0	October 1, 2013	978-1-4215-5935-3
3	February 10, 2010	978-4-09-132894-6	December 3, 2013	978-1-4215-5936-0
4	August 10, 2010	978-4-09-133303-2	February 4, 2014	978-1-4215-5937-7
5	January 7, 2011	978-4-09-133415-2	April 1, 2014	978-1-4215-5938-4
6	April 8, 2011	978-4-09-133745-0	June 3, 2014	978-1-4215-5939-1
7	August 10, 2011	978-4-09-134004-7	August 5, 2014	978-1-4215-5940-7
8	December 9, 2011	978-4-09-134186-0	October 7, 2014	978-1-4215-5941-4
9	April 10, 2012	978-4-09-134394-9	December 2, 2014	978-1-4215-5942-1
10	September 10, 2012	978-4-09-134612-4	February 3, 2015	978-1-4215-5943-8

=== Live Action Drama ===
A Japanese live action drama titled Happy Marriage!? aired from June 22, 2016, to August 31, 2016. The drama is available on Amazon Prime Video.

Main cast

- Seino Nana as Takanashi Chiwa
- Dean Fujioka as Mamiya Hokuto

Supporting cast

- Enjouji Aya as Mamiya Saori
- Ono Takehiko as Mamiya Rinzo
- Kondo Yoshimasa as Mamiya Satoru
- Yamazaki Ginnojo as Mamiya Seiji
- Washio Machiko as Reiko
- Fujiwara Norika: Souma Taeko
- Shirasu Jin: Yagami Yuu
- Shinoda Mariko: Shitara Misaki
- Nukumizu Yoichi: Takanashi Yuji

== Reception ==
Issue	Copies sold	As of (date)
Volume 1	22,146	June 14, 2009
Volume 2		
Volume 3	44,737	February 14, 2010
Volume 4	69,471	August 15, 2010
Volume 5	92,445	January 16, 2011
Volume 6	93,108	April 17, 2011
Volume 7	109,870	August 21, 2011
Volume 8	105,242	December 18, 2011
Volume 9	91,690	April 15, 2012
Volume 10	131,117	September 23, 2012
