= Maki Enjōji =

Japanese manga writer and artist

Maki Enjōji 円城寺マキ
- Born: 8 December Tokyo, Japan
- Area: Tokyo
- Pseudonym: Maki
- Notable works: Fu Junai; Private Prince; Happy Marriage!?

Maki Enjōji (円城寺マキ, Enjōji Maki; born 8 December) is a Japanese manga artist. Some of her works, such as Happy Marriage!? and Private Prince, have been published in French and German by Kazé and Tokyopop. Editorial Ivrea has released the Spanish version of Private Prince in 2011, which is still ongoing. Happy Marriage!? will be published in English under VIZ Media's Shojo Beat imprint on 6 August 2013.

== Career ==
Her debut as a manga artist was a one-shot called Fu Junai that was published in 2004 in the special issue of April of the Japanese josei manga magazine Petit Comic published by Shogakukan. Since then, she published all her works to date in this magazine. Fu Junai was also the first manga of the author published in Germany, where the title was translated as "Private Love Stories", in April 2009. Enjōji is currently working on the story Dear Brother!, released in October 2011. Her hobbies include cats and traveling.

Her works stand out for their thematic feature of the josei genre, which is love and sexual relations between adult men and women in a humorous and dramatic tone.

== Major works ==
- 2004 Fu Junai（不・純愛）(One-shot)
- 2004 Atashi wa Sore o Gaman Dekinai (あたしはそれを我慢できない) (One-shot)
- 2004 Tsuiteru Kanojo (ツいてる彼女) (One-shot)
- 2005 Koisuru Heart de Taihoshite (恋するハートでタイホして) (One-shot)
- 2005–2009 Private Prince (プライベート・プリンス) (5 volumes)
- 2005 Sekai wa Bokura no Tameni! (世界はボクらのために!) (2 volumes)
- 2008 Yoru Café – My Sweet Knights（ヨルカフェ。）(3 volumes)
- 2009–2012 Hapi Mari 〜Happy Marriage!?〜 (はぴまり〜Happy Marriage!?〜) (10 volumes)
- 2012– Dear Brother! (ディア ブラザー!) (5 volumes)
- 2014–2016 SP x Baby (SP×ベイビー) (2 volumes)
- 2016–2019 An Incurable Case of Love (恋はつづくよどこまでも) (7 volumes)
- 2019–2021 Tsumari Sukitte Iitain dakedo (つまり好きって言いたいんだけど) (3 volumes)
