= An Incurable Case of Love =

Japanese manga series

- Cover of the first volume

恋はつづくよどこまでも (Koi wa Tsuzuku yo Doko made mo)
- Genre: Drama, romance
- Manga
- Written by: Maki Enjōji
- Published by: Shogakukan
- English publisher: NA: Viz Media
- Magazine: Petit Comic
- Original run: June 8, 2016 – January 8, 2019
- Volumes: 7
- Television drama
- Directed by: Kenta Tanaka
- Produced by: Masako Miyazaki; Akiko Matsumoto
- Written by: Arisa Kaneko
- Original network: TBS TV
- Original run: January 14, 2020 – March 17, 2020
- Episodes: 10

An Incurable Case of Love (Japanese: 恋はつづくよどこまでも, Hepburn: Koi wa Tsuzuku yo Doko made mo) is a Japanese manga series written and illustrated by Maki Enjōji. It was serialized in Shogakukan's Petit Comic magazine from June 2016 to January 2019 and published in seven volumes. A live-action television drama adaptation aired from January to March 2020.

== Plot ==
Nanase Sakura, who met and fell in love with a doctor, studied hard with the desire to meet him and becomes a nurse. When she meets him again after five years, she finds out that he is a completely different person than what she had imagined. However, Nanase continues to convey her thoughts honestly to Tendō. Nanase's efforts to convey her thoughts and love for her work eventually melt Tendō's heart.

== Characters ==
Nanase Sakura (佐倉 七瀬, Sakura Nanase)
Female respiratory nurse. (Note: Cardiology nurse in the live-action drama adaptation.) She wanted to become a nurse after meeting Tendō who helped the elderly five years ago. She has a strong sense of responsibility and gradually gains the trusts of her coworkers. She is called "Hero-chan" by some nurses and doctors. She likes to drink, and does so with Ryūko; however, she is a lightweight and gets out of hand when drunk.
Kairi Tendō (天堂 浬, Tendō Kairi)
Pulmonologist. (Note: Cardiologist in the live-action drama adaptation.) He looks cold and is unfriendly. He tends to treat Nanase coolly, but as he watches her grow as her boss, teaching her important things as a nurse, he becomes attracted to her single-mindedness. As a doctor, he is very skilled and highly trusted by his patients. He is called the "Demon King". He likes sweet things, especially cream bread. Although he is the younger brother of Ryūko, a drinker, he has a weakness for alcohol and doesn't drink much.
Ryūko Tendō (天堂 流子, Tendō Ryūko)
Kairi's older sister. She works as an apartment manager. Unlike Kairi, she has an innocent personality, and he dislikes her. She loves alcohol and often drinks with Nanase.
Kōichi Kizuki (来生 晃一, Kizuki Kōichi)
Respiratory doctor. The most popular doctor at the hospital who has a calm personality. His nickname is "Magician".
Ryūsei Nishi (仁志 琉星, Nishi Ryūsei)
Pediatric nurse. During his training period, he sees how Nanase is attached to children and invites her to the pediatric department. Although he is a nurse, he does not do well with blood. He likes Ryūko.
Minori Wakabayashi (若林 みのり, Wakabayashi Minori)
Kairi's ex-girlfriend and Miori's older sister. She was a medical school classmate of Kairi and Kizuki but passed away eight years ago due to an illness.
Miori Wakabayashi (若林 みおり, Wakabayashi Miori)
Minori's younger twin sister and a heart surgeon. She has a clumsy and easy-going personality.
Misa Kanno (菅野 海砂, Kanno Misa)
Works in the emergency room. (Note: Works in the pediatric department in the live-action drama adaptation.) He was a university student at the same time as Nanase, and somehow looking after her.
Yuika Sakai (酒井 結華, Sakai Yuika)
Trainee targeting Kairi and love rival of Nanase. (Note: In the live-action drama adaptation, she is in the same graduating class as Nanase, has an unrequited love for Kizuki, and is work rivals with Nanase.) She is a talented new nurse and relied on.

== Media ==
=== Manga ===
Written and illustrated by Maki Enjōji, the series began serialization in Shueisha's Petit Comic magazine on June 8, 2019. The series completed its serialization on January 8, 2021. Its individual chapters were collected into seven tankōbon volumes.

In March 2019, Viz Media announced that they licensed the series for English publication. The series is also licensed in Indonesia by Elex Media Komputindo under the title Everlasting Love.

==== Volume list ====
No.	Original release date	Original ISBN	English release date	English ISBN
1	September 9, 2016	978-4-09-138559-8	October 1, 2019	978-1-97-470931-1
2	February 10, 2017	978-4-09-139227-5	January 7, 2020	978-1-97-470932-8
3	July 10, 2017	978-4-09-139434-7	April 7, 2020	978-1-97-470933-5
4	December 8, 2017	978-4-09-139673-0	July 7, 2020	978-1-97-470934-2
5	May 10, 2018	978-4-09-870065-3	October 6, 2020	978-1-97-470935-9
6	October 10, 2018	978-4-09-870240-4	January 5, 2021	978-1-97-471234-2
7	March 8, 2019	978-4-09-870371-5	April 6, 2021	978-1-97-471235-9

=== Live-action ===
A live-action television drama adaptation was announced in July 2019. The drama was directed by Kenta Tanaka among others, with Arisa Kaneko writing the scripts and Masako Miyazaki and Akiko Matsumoto producing. Mone Kamishiraishi and Takeru Satoh performed the lead roles. Official Hige Dandism performed the series' theme song, "I Love..." It was aired on TBS TV from January 14 to March 17, 2020, for a total of ten episodes.
