= Bara no Tame ni =

Japanese manga series

- For the Roses' Sake

薔薇のために
- Genre: Romance
- Manga
- Written by: Akemi Yoshimura
- Published by: Shogakukan
- Magazine: Petit Comic
- Original run: 1992 – 1998
- Volumes: 16

Bara no Tame ni (薔薇のために; lit. For the Roses' Sake) is a josei manga by Akemi Yoshimura. It was serialized in Shogakukan's Petit Comic between 1992 and 1998. The series received the Shogakukan Manga Award for shōjo in 1994.

== Plot ==
Yuri Makurano is an unattractive girl who learns her mother is a famous actress named Shoko Hanai following her grandmother's death. Yuri begins to live with her mother's family which consists of three children named Sumire, Aoi, and Fuyo Hanatashiki. Yuri is treated as a maid at the household, eventually bonding with the family and builds up unrequited feelings for Sumire. Later, she comes to learn the only blood relation she has to the family is Aoi, her half brother.

=== Characters ===
Yuri Makurano (枕野 ゆり, Makurano Yuki)
Yuri is an unattractive girl whose only talent is housekeeping. She is initially believed to be Ichiro Makurano and Shoko Hanai's daughter. Eventually, she learns her parents were the Kusinagis, Ichiro's friends who died after a false double suicide; this makes her Aoi's half sibling. She admired Sumire since she saw his debut acting as a child. In the Taiwanese drama, she is portrayed by Ella Chen.
Sumire Hanatashiki (花屋敷 菫, Hanatashiki Sumire)
Sumire is the middle child and was born to Shoko Hanai and her second husband, an American film producer. He wears sunglasses most of the time to hide his blue eyes due to the attention he receives. Sumire was engaged to a girl named Seri; her death caused him severe angst and he attempted suicide multiple times. Due to Yuri's influence, he begins to recover from her death.
Aoi Hanatashiki (花屋敷 葵, Hanatashiki Aoi)
Aoi is the youngest child and was born to Shoko Hanai and Kusanagi, a man whom she had an affair with. He joined the Hanatashiki family when he was a preteen, resulting in him falling in love with Sumire; as a result, Aoi grows his hair out to appear more feminine. When Yuri joins the family, he begins to shift his love towards her.
Fuyo Hanatashiki (花屋敷 芙蓉, Hanatashiki Fuyō)
Fuyo is the oldest child and was born to Shoko Hanai and her first husband. She excelled at housekeeping as she wanted to become a good wife. She was once married but divorced due to her husband siding with her abusive step mother. Since then, she has been disdained to housekeeping and spends most of her time watching movies. Due to her deductive abilities, she realizes Yuri's relationship to the family.
Shoko Hanai (花井 しょう子, Hanai Shōko)
Shoko, once known as Teruko Hanatashiki, was in love with Ichiro Makurano (枕野 一郎, Makurano Ichirō), a man who was years her senior. When Ichiro became stricken with disease, he ended his relationship with Shoko by claiming Yuri was his daughter to spare her the suffering, causing Shoko to lose her trust in men. Afterwards, she adopts a loose lifestyle full of parties and men; she becomes calmer after learning the truth about Ichiro and Yuri.

== Release ==
Bara no Tame ni is authored by Akemi Yoshimura and was serialized in Shogakukan's Petit Comic between 1992 and 1998. It was compiled into sixteen tankōbon volumes released between September 1992 and January 1998. The shinsōban contained nine volumes released between October 2000 and February 2001. The series won a Shogakukan Manga Award for shōjo in 1994.

=== Volume list ===
No.	Japanese release date	Japanese ISBN
1	September 26, 1992	409134481X
Chapters 1–4
Yuri Makurano's grandmother dies and she learns from her will that she is to live with her mother, a famous actress named Shoko Hanai. Yuri is introduced to her three siblings, Sumire, Aoi and Fuya Hanatashiki, who treat her coldly. When drunk however, Sumire treats Yuri well, eliciting envy from Aoi who has an incestuous attraction to him. Yuri later learns that her first love from a movie was Sumire.
2	January 26, 1993	4091344828
Chapters 5–8
Yuri's ex-boyfriend lodges at the Hanatashiki household due to his new girlfriend; when the couple insults Yuri, her siblings come to her defense. Yuri asks her mother about her father and learns that her father had an affair; however the maid explains to Yuri that her father faked the affair to spare her mother from learning about his terminal illness. Later, Yuri and Aoi are invited to the same wedding; Aoi forces Yuri on a diet causing her to faint. Expressing regret, Aoi monologues his reasons for bullying her. Yuri learns about Sumire's past and his engagement to Seri Tsubakaisawa and her death soon after.
3	July 26, 1993	4091344836
Chapters 9–12
Aoi is divided between his feelings for Sumire and Yuri and deals with it during their vacation at a ski lounge. Later, one of Shoko's men attempts to kiss Yuri causing her to declare her hatred of men. In response, a drunken Sumire kisses her to convince her otherwise. Yuri learns she is not Shoko's daughter and flees from the ski lounge. A manga artist named Nekokichi Momoya deduces Yuri's situation and has her come to his house to cook for him and his assistants while they work.
4	October 26, 1993	4091344844
Chapters 13–16
The maid reveals the full story about Yuri's father to Shoko, explaining he pretended Yuri was his child to have Shoko leave him, sparing her from suffering from his terminal illness. Yuri returns home and learns of her true relationship to the Hanatashiki family; Aoi also overhears the truth and realizes he likes Yuri. Later Yuri learns about Sumire's obsession with Seri and Fuyo's past.
5	January 26, 1994	4091344852
Chapters 17–20
Sumire becomes curious on who Yuri likes; when Nekokichi brings up the possibility Yuri likes him, Sumire declares his disgust for incest. When Yuri and Aoi are home alone, Aoi confesses his love for her causing her to panic; Aoi then pretends his confession was a lie. Later a girl resembling Seri begins lodging at their household. Yuri and Aoi believe the girl is using her physical appearance to date Sumire, causing a dispute between the two group.
6	April 26, 1994	4091344860
Chapters 21–24
Sumire explains he is only using the girl to satisfy his lust and was not manipulated by her physical appearance, settling the dispute between them; he later confides to Yuri about how unsettled he feels whenever something reminds him of Seri. Later, Fuyo and Nekokichi go on a date and discuss issues they have with their mothers. A professional cosmetician takes Yuri up as a challenge and succeeds; he asks her to work as a model for him but is refused. Yuri celebrates her 20th birthday and confesses to Sumire about how she admired his film debut.
7	October 26, 1994	4091344879
Chapters 25–28
Yuri nurses Aoi and Sumire after they caught a cold; while sick, Sumire gives Yuri a letter from her adopted father. Yuri catches the cold and has Fuyo cook food for Nekokichi in her place. Yuri, Sumire, and Aoi travel to a beach where Sumire reminisces about Seri. Yuri meets an old colleague who attempts to convince her to sleep with him but is rebuffed.
8	March 25, 1995	4091344887
Chapters 29–32
Shoko arranges a miai for Yuri; while at the miai Aoi declares he will give up on Yuri if Sumire takes her. Aoi confesses his love for Yuri and his old love for Sumire aloud before moving out of the house. After a discussion with Aoi he returns home.
9	July 26, 1995	4091344895
Chapters 33–36
Sumire's American half sister visits him causing him to contemplate his feelings for Yuri; Sumire begins to realize he is overcoming his loss for Seri. Seri's best friend comes to the Hanatashiki household and attempts to convince Sumire to marry her. After being rebuffed, she tells Sumire that Yuri has the same aura as Seri, to which the latter agrees. The Hanatashiki family goes skiing again and Yuri is injured when she falls off a cliff. In a dazed state, Yuri confesses her love to Sumire and that they are not blood related.
10	December 13, 1995	4091344909
Chapters 37–40
Yuri recovers but a psychological block causes her to become mute; Sumire convinces her to speak by accepting their non-blood relationship. Sumire becomes irritated of finding himself in Yuri's bed whenever he is drunk; Yuri deduces he is searching for Seri in his dreams and helps him overcome it. Later, a girl whom Aoi promised to marry as a child comes to the Hanatashiki household to make him honor his commitment but is rebuffed.
11	April 25, 1996	4091368417
Chapters 41–44
Fuyo confides her past to Yuri and how she viewed the maid as a mother figure. Meanwhile, Aoi and the girl he promised to marry end their relationship amicably.
12	September 26, 1996	4091368425
Chapters 45–48
Sumire's talent as a novelist causes him to become famous.
13	December 11, 1996	4091368433
Chapters 49–52
14	April 24, 1997	4091368441
Chapters 53–56
15	September 26, 1997	409136845X
Chapters 59–62
16	January 26, 1998	4091368468
Chapters 63–66

== Live-action drama adaption ==
The manga was adapted into a Taiwanese drama titled The Rose (simplified Chinese: 蔷薇之恋; traditional Chinese: 薔薇之戀; pinyin: Qiáng Wéi Zhī Liàn) and directed by Chu Yu-ning. It was broadcast on Taiwan Television between March and November 2003. The series received a Golden Bell Award in 2004.
