= Butterflies, Flowers =

Japanese manga series

- English edition of the first volume of Butterflies, Flowers as published by Viz Media

蝶よ花よ (Chō yo Hana yo)
- Genre: Romantic comedy
- Manga
- Written by: Yuki Yoshihara
- Published by: Shogakukan
- English publisher: NA: Viz Media
- Magazine: Petit Comic
- Original run: February 24, 2006 – March 10, 2009
- Volumes: 8

Butterflies, Flowers (Japanese: 蝶よ花よ, Hepburn: Chō yo Hana yo) is a manga series written and illustrated by Yuki Yoshihara, serialized in Petit Comic and published by Shogakukan in bound volumes between 2006 and 2009. It is about a young woman, Choko, whose family lost their money, and her entry into the office lady workforce, working for her former servant and childhood crush, Domoto. It was licensed in English by Viz Media, in Taiwanese by Tong Li Publishing, and in French by Soleil Productions.

== Release ==
No.	Original release date	Original ISBN	English release date	English ISBN
1	February 24, 2006	4091303420	December 1, 2009	9781421532035
2	July 26, 2006	4091305482	April 6, 2010	9781421532042
3	December 12, 2006	4091307558	June 1, 2010	9781421532059
4	May 25, 2007	9784091310569	September 7, 2010	9781421532066
5	October 26, 2007	9784091313683	December 7, 2010	9781421532073
6	July 10, 2008	9784091316745	March 1, 2011	9781421532080
7	November 10, 2008	9784091320490	June 7, 2011	9781421532738
8	March 10, 2009	9784091322456	September 6, 2011	9781421535814

== Reception ==
Deb Aoki describes the manga as "spicing up" shōjo manga humour and plot conventions, but found the portrayal of sexual harassment off-putting, and felt that readers looking for sex scenes would be better served with yaoi. Nick Smith felt that although it was well written, there were many offensive scenes in the first volume, and noted the erratic behaviour of Domoto. Leroy Douresseaux describes it as " a high school romance masquerading as an adult, workplace romantic comedy and drama". Alexander Hoffman praised the humour in the relationship, and enjoyed the secondary cast. Casey Brienza compared the funny, yet not idealistic depiction of Choko's working life to the depiction of Sumire's in Tramps Like Us, and feels that the sexual harassment shown in the series is not condoned by it. Katherine Dacey praised the manga's "elegant artwork", "colorful supporting cast and melodramatic plot twists", but was disappointed at the use of the "stalker-as-great-romantic-prospect trope". Johanna Draper Carlson felt that it was necessary to understand some aspects of Japanese culture in order to fully appreciate the work. Melinda Beasi felt that the characters became more sympathetic, and their situation more humorous, as the first volume progressed.
