= Yume no Shizuku, Kin no Torikago =

Japanese manga written and illustrated by Chie Shinohara

- Cover of the first volume

夢の雫、黄金の鳥籠
- Genre: Historical, romance
- Manga
- Written by: Chie Shinohara
- Published by: Shogakukan
- Imprint: Flower Comics α
- Magazine: Ane-kei Petit Comic
- Original run: May 21, 2010 – June 5, 2024
- Volumes: 20

Yume no Shizuku, Kin no Torikago (夢の雫、黄金の鳥籠; lit. "Drops of Dreams, Birdcage of Gold") is a Japanese historical drama and romance manga written and illustrated by Chie Shinohara. It was serialized on Shogakukan's Ane-kei PetitComic manga magazine from May 2010 to June 2024, with its chapters collected into twenty tankōbon volumes.

== Characters ==
Hurrem (ヒュッレム, Hyurremu)
The female protagonist of the story, Alexandra is kidnapped by pillagers raiding her village in Ruthenia and taken to Constantinople to be sold as a slave. One night, Alexandra runs away from the slavers, but is lost in the streets of Constantinople and almost assaulted. She is rescued by a mysterious black-haired man named Mateus who tells her to gain knowledge in order to gain true freedom and escorts her back to the slavers. At a slave auction, she is purchased by Mateus who educates and trains her in upper class etiquette, and skills such as singing, dancing, music, and the Ottoman Turkish language. Alexandra falls in love with Mateus, and so, she meticulously studies to become his ideal woman, hoping that Mateus will accept her into his harem. Upon completion of her training, Mateus gives her the Turkish name, Hurrem, and gifts her to his master and sultan, Suleiman, who accepts her into his harem. Hurrem quickly rises in ranks in the harem and eventually becomes an iqbal - a favorite concubine - of Suleiman, and later bears him five children - four sons and a daughter.

== Publication ==
Written and illustrated by Chie Shinohara, Yume no Shizuku, Kin no Torikago began serialization in the first issue of Shogakukan's Ane-kei Petit Comic magazine published on May 21, 2010. It ended serialization on June 5, 2024. The series' chapters were collected into twenty tankōbon volumes from September 2011 to October 2024.

No.	Release date	ISBN
1	September 9, 2011	978-4-09-134010-8
2	March 9, 2012	978-4-09-134216-4
3	November 9, 2012	978-4-09-134683-4
4	September 10, 2013	978-4-09-135504-1
5	August 8, 2014	978-4-09-136257-5
6	February 10, 2015	978-4-09-136750-1
7	August 10, 2015	978-4-09-137104-1
8	April 8, 2016	978-4-09-138315-0
9	December 9, 2016	978-4-09-138770-7
10	August 10, 2017	978-4-09-139435-4
11	April 10, 2018	978-4-09-870060-8
12	December 10, 2018	978-4-09-870248-0
13	October 10, 2019	978-4-09-870668-6
14	July 18, 2020	978-4-09-871019-5
15	February 10, 2021	978-4-09-871265-6
16	December 10, 2021	978-4-09-871529-9
17	August 10, 2022	978-4-09-871655-5
18	June 9, 2023	978-4-09-872115-3
19	February 8, 2024	978-4-09-872516-8
20	October 10, 2024	978-4-09-872841-1

== Reception ==
It was ranked 20th on the 2012 Kono Manga ga Sugoi! Top 20 Manga for Female Readers survey. It was also ranked 50th, alongside Go with the Clouds, North by Northwest, in the 2020 "Book of the Year" list by Da Vinci magazine. It has been nominated for the 70th Shogakukan Manga Award in 2024.

Volume 1 reached the 16th place on the weekly Oricon manga charts, and, as of September 18, 2011, has sold 66,987 copies. Volume 4 reached the 3rd place, and, as of September 22, 2013, has sold 150,325 copies. Volume 5 reached the 10th place and, as of August 17, 2014, has sold 124,952 copies. Volume 6 reached the 3rd place and, as of February 15, 2015, has sold 110,095 copies.
