= Midnight Secretary =

Japanese manga series

- Cover of Midnight Secretary volume 1 as published by Shogakukan featuring Kaya Satozuka (right) and Kyouhei Touma

(ミッドナイト·セクレタリ) (Middonaito Sekuretari)
- Genre: Romance, Supernatural fiction
- Manga
- Written by: Ohmi Tomu
- Published by: Shogakukan
- English publisher: NA: Viz Media
- Magazine: Petit Comic
- Original run: August 8, 2006 – May 8, 2009
- Volumes: 7

Midnight Secretary (Japanese: ミッドナイト·セクレタリ, Hepburn: Middonaito Sekuretari) is a supernatural romance manga series by Ohmi Tomu that was serialized in the manga magazine Petit Comic since 2006, with the 34th and final chapter published in the May 2009 issue. The serial chapters were collected in seven shinshobon volumes by Shogakukan. Viz Media licensed the series and released the first volume on September 3, 2013.

Midnight Secretary follows the relationship between Kaya Satozuka, a private secretary, and her boss, Director Kyouhei Touma of the Touma Company, who is a vampire.

== Plot ==
Considered to be the "perfect secretary" yet constantly criticized for her ultra-conservative dress style by her boss, Director Kyouhei Touma of the Touma Company, Kaya lives a normal life until she finds out that her employer is actually a vampire. Despite uncovering his identity, she dedicates herself to serving the Director to the best of her abilities. The early part of the story focuses on the trials and tribulations of Kaya's increasingly hectic workload, then shifts to the developing personal relationship between her and the Director.

== Characters ==
=== Major ===
Kaya Satozuka
The main character of the story, Kaya starts her position as private secretary to the Director at the beginning of the manga. She dresses in a very sophisticated style when at work, citing her professionalism, yet does so mainly because of her insecurity about her child-like looks. Due to her plainness, she is initially rejected by the Director for the job, yet she proves to be an invaluable worker and succeeds in gaining his acknowledgment. Despite discovering that the Director is a vampire, Kaya remains loyal to him and does everything in her power to protect his health and secret. Over the course of the story, she starts developing feelings for the Director, and becomes torn between her responsibilities and personal life. Her blood is considered to be a special rarity, which is able to quench the Director's thirst with just a single drop. She eventually develops a sexual relationship with the director and leaves her official position as his secretary to work for a subsidiary company. Later on, she becomes the director's "midnight secretary", doing his office work at night in his mansion after she leaves her other job. She falls in love with the director, but is stubborn to the point where she insists it's only because she's his secretary that she risks so much for him. Kaya continues to be the perfect secretary, always trying to put business before her feelings, because she thinks that if she lets her "cowardice as a woman" get in the way of their relationship, she'll only trouble Kyouhei. Later she confesses to the director that if she were not a perfect secretary, then he would want nothing to do with her, and that scares her. After that, everything goes normally, and Kaya, thinking the director wants to break it off with her, decides to "...break the wall between vampires and humans..." and goes to Kyouhei not as a secretary or food, but as a woman. At a time where the climax of whether she was with a baby or not was being distributed among the vampire clan, Kaya was flooded with numerous engagement proposals and wedding interviews - due to Hiraoka claiming she, as a human was a hindrance to the pride-taking clan. Kyouhei eventually proposes to her casually so they can live together, offering her mother to live with them also. The two confront her mother with their engagement, and after some reluctance she accepts it and agrees to come live with them. Shortly after Kaya finds that she is unable to have Kyouhei touch her without breaking out in shivers and after attempting to feed from her, Kyouhei finds that her blood has turned to poison. After speaking with an ally in the vampire clan, they find the reason for this problem is that Kaya is pregnant, with a powerful vampire baby. (To 'protect' the mother the baby somehow makes her blood poisonous to vampires to discourage being fed upon and uncomfortable feelings at touching vampires.) After Kaya reaches an 'understanding' with the baby, Kyouhei is able to touch her, but has to restrain himself as he's under 'probation'. The vampire clan wants to kidnap Kaya as powerful vampires are rare, only another vampire could resist being controlled by the baby, and to have the child become part of the clan 'properly'. Thanks to some plans and hard work, (most of which he deliberately didn't tell Kaya what it was for to tease her) Kyouhei is able to get the clan to stop trying to kidnap her for the time being. At the end of the series, Kaya and Kyouhei are married in a small, private ceremony and await the birth of their child.
Kyouhei Touma
The Director of the Touma Company, Kyouhei is known for his capability and strictness in the business world, which is preceded by his reputation with women and his ability to charm them for his own pleasures. Soon after being appointed a new secretary, he is discovered to be a vampire after one of his "meals". Despite being a vampire, he states that they avoid killing humans and their bite doesn't turn a human into a vampire. He's very cold towards his family, seemingly not caring for their welfare or concern. However, he works behind the scenes to protect his family such as during negotiations for a merger with another company he used his resources to uncover evidence of wrongdoing by several individuals which would've badly harmed his family's company. The women whom he sleeps with are his "meals" whenever he needs blood to quench his thirst. Because of seeing them as a mere necessity, he shows no particular interest or love for any woman. However, this attitude becomes shaken with the introduction of Kaya in his life. He eventually becomes attached to her, despite his stated insistence that she is nothing more than food to him. At one point, he refuses to drink any other blood than Kaya's, and jumps into the midday sun to save her life. He is frustrated with his growing love for Kaya, and is even more frustrated at Kaya's constant distance, as she is often telling him that she does the things she does because of her position as a secretary and nothing more. He confesses to Kaya through a fit of anger and after she confesses her fear of him leaving her, that even if she were not food nor his secretary that he'd, "continue to torment you. Because I want you!" After he admits to himself he may love her, Kaya comes one night and he openly admits to her that he loves her. After Kyouhei is banished from the clan, (he refused to give up Kaya despite the vampire clan reminding him that she wasn't worthy enough by their standards) he proposes to Kaya so that they can live together without her mother worrying. Although she finds out he's a vampire thanks to a dirty trick from the vampire clan, she reluctantly agrees to them seeing each other. Despite the fact that Kaya is now pregnant with a powerful vampire baby, which is preventing him from feeding on her blood, Kyouhei marries her and now waits for his child to be born.
Masaki Touma
Manager and previous boss of Kaya, Masaki is Kyouhei's older brother. Despite being related by blood, he isn't a vampire. Characterized by his sincere and caring nature for the company's employees, and the welfare of his brother, he is looked up to and admired by Kaya, whom he feels obligated to protect.

=== Minor ===
Shuuichirou Touma
President of the Touma Company and human father of Kyouhei and Masaki.
Matsushita
Personal driver for Director Kyouhei Touma, he is responsible for taking home the various women the Director has for "meals". Though knowing his employer is a vampire he remains dedicated to his job.
Yoshifumi Takasu
President of Erde and everything Kyouhei isn't. He is a kind man who at first rejected Kaya to work for Erde because he believed they had no use for secretaries. However he came to acknowledge her and became attracted to her as well and even proposed to her before she left Erde to work for Kyohei at LVC Company. When considering the proposal, Kaya concluded that while Takasu would be a "kind, reliable husband" and their home would be "warm and full of sunlight", her eyes would "always wander towards the shadows this brightness would cast, and in those shadows she'd always see that man [Kyouhei]." He lives with his cat and has a large collection of eye-glasses.
Marika
The second female vampire character, she is very much like Kyohei only more playful. She is his childhood friend and continues to support him as best as she knows throughout the story. She dislikes Kaya to a certain extent and she also doesn't approve of her father because he isn't a wealthy or powerful human. She eventually falls in love with a human (who knows she's a vampire) like Kyohei, except he serves as her butler rather than secretary and like Kaya has hidden strengths.
Yasuko Touma
She is Kyohei Touma's mother, a vampire. Her ties with the vampire clan were severed when she fell in love with Kyohei and Masaki's father, and she blames herself that Kyohei is a vampire and Kaya explains it, doesn't realize that when she says that it is offensive to Kyohei.
Hiraoka
A human follower of the vampire clan. He saves Kaya several times throughout the manga. His loyalty to the clan is great. He follows the rules of the leader of the clan precisely. Hiraoka has tried to separate Kaya from Kyouhei by bombarding Kaya with numerous engagement proposals and wedding interviews within few days, explaining plainly that she was of no value to the vampire clan, and that the least she could do as a human was to hide their scandal. When Kaya's blood is undrinkable he informs Kyouhei and her that it might be because she is pregnant with a vampire child with great powers.

== Development ==
Midnight Secretary is the third series by author and artist Ohmi Tomu that has a theme centered around vampires. The basic romantic storyline along with the vampiric theme was borrowed from her original debut manga Kindan no Koi wo Shiyou. Several backstory concepts - such as vampires only being able to bear children with humans and the resulting offspring being completely one or the other - was also taken from her earlier works. Tomu stayed away from traditional folklore about vampires and instead portrayed them as upper-class with widespread societal influence. Although common associations with vampires were avoided or altered, bats were still used as a motif but not employed in the actual storyline. Though not intended by the author, the series resulted into becoming a sort of cinderella complex caused by the building mental and emotional conflict between the main characters.

When drawing the main character Kaya Satozuka, author Ohmi Tomu used actress Hiromi Nagasaku and her own sister-in-law as references for Kaya's appearance. She also used her sister-in-law as a basic model for Kaya's personality because of her firm and resolute nature. Kaya's undergarments were given a certain degree of attention because of Tomu's penchant for lace underwear. The amount of exposure was increased in later chapters as the story progressed.

For Kyouhei Touma, she was careful to note various details of his appearance depending on the setting of the scene. In particular, his hair was the most difficult to draw.

== Manga ==
Midnight Secretary is written and illustrated by Ohmi Tomu. It was serialized by Shogakukan in the josei (aimed at younger adult women) manga magazine Petit Comic from 2006 to May 2009. Serial chapters were collected in seven shinsōban volumes under the Flower Comics imprint.

Volume one was Tomu's sixteenth published volume.

No.	Original release date	Original ISBN	English release date	English ISBN
1	26 February 2007	978-4-09-130857-3	3 September 2013	978-1-42-155944-5
2	26 September 2007	978-4-09-131206-8	5 November 2013	978-1-42-155945-2
3	21 December 2007	978-4-09-131387-4	7 January 2014	978-1-42-155946-9
4	10 July 2008	978-4-09-131675-2	4 March 2014	978-1-42-155947-6
5	10 November 2008	978-4-09-132050-6	6 May 2014	978-1-42-155948-3
6	10 March 2009	978-4-09-132246-3	1 July 2014	978-1-42-155949-0
7	10 August 2009	978-4-09-132570-9	2 September 2014	978-1-42-155950-6

== Reception ==
Volume 5 reached #8 on the Oricon/Tohan manga sales chart for 11–17 November 2008, and volume 6 reached #18.

The Romance novel review site Smart Bitches, Trashy Books called the series addictive, describing it as "like Harlequin: Presents crossed with manga and vampire romance." Rebecca Silverman, of Anime News Network, gave volume 1 an overall grade of B+.
