= Purple Eyes in the Dark =

Japanese manga series

- Cover of the first manga volume of Purple Eyes in the Dark

闇のパープル·アイ (Yami no Pāpuru Ai)
- Genre: Drama, romance, supernatural
- Manga
- Written by: Chie Shinohara
- Published by: Shogakukan
- Magazine: Shōjo Comic
- Original run: 1984 – 1986
- Volumes: 12
- Music video
- Directed by: Mizuho Nishikubo
- Studio: J.C. Staff, Youmex
- Released: 1987
- Runtime: 30 minutes
- Light novel

Purple Eyes in the Dark Novel
- Published by: Shogakukan
- Original run: August 1991 – November 1992
- Volumes: 6
- Television drama
- Directed by: Masato Tsuzino
- Written by: Minoru Tanabe
- Studio: Toei Company
- Original network: TV Asahi
- Original run: July 1, 1996 – September 9, 1996
- Episodes: 11

Purple Eyes in the Dark (Japanese: 闇のパープル·アイ, Hepburn: Yami no Pāpuru Ai) is a Japanese shōjo manga series written and illustrated by Chie Shinohara. It was serialized in Shōjo Comic magazine from 1984 to 1986. The individual chapters were collected in 12 tankōbon volumes published by Shogakukan between October 1984 and February 1987. The story follows the struggles of a teenage girl after she finds herself turning into a lycanthropy-leopard and having to battle her newly found predatory instincts.

The series was adapted into a 30-minute music video (original video animation) in 1987 and a series of six light novels which were published from 1991 to 1992. It was also adapted into an 11-episode live-action Japanese television drama that was broadcast on TV Asahi in Japan in 1996.

Purple Eyes in the Dark was awarded the 1987 Shogakukan Manga Award in the shōjo manga category.

== Story ==
Rinko Ozaki is a normal high school girl, but she has a fixation on a weird birthmark on her arm. Her biology teacher, Ms. Sonehara, has a peculiar interest in the birthmark, and it fires up when her childhood friend, Shin'ya Mizushima, tries to make a move on her. Not only that, Rinko also notices her eyes glow purple. The next day when Rinko is sexually assaulted, she finally discovers that her birthmark causes her to shapeshift into a leopard.

== Characters ==
Rinko Ozaki (尾崎倫子)
A first year in high-school, she has a crush on her childhood friend Shin'ya Mizushima. When assaulted by some of her classmates, Rinko involuntarily transforms into a leopard and kills them.
Shin'ya Mizushima
A third year high-school student, Shin'ya has known Rinko since they were very young. He first shelters Rinko after finding her unconscious after the deaths of their classmates.
Kaoruko Sonehara
Rinko's biology teacher. She and her father studied humans who could turn into beasts. She first suspects Rinko of being one of these humans after she sees her birthmark. She is a cruel woman who tries to conduct experiments on Rinko and even her sister Maiko, assuming that she can transform too because they have the same blood.
Maiko Ozaki
Rinko's sister. She later dies when Sonehara experiments on her, thinking she too can transform.
Professor Sonehara
Kaoruko's father, he also studied people who can transform into beasts. When he presents his evidence to the world of science, he is shamed and rejected leading him to set himself on fire in a fit of madness. Kaoruko douses the flames and he survives, but ends up succumbing to insanity. Kaoruko locks him in the basement of their home to make the world believe he died instead of tainting his image and research with his mental breakdown.
Mitusgu Odagiri
A journalist who originally tries to expose Sonehara's research on humans that can turn into beasts, but later on ends up pursuing Rinko and revealing that he has purple eyes too. He can transform into a black panther that is larger than Rinko.

== Media ==
=== Manga ===
Written and illustrated by Chie Shinohara, Purple Eyes in the Dark was serialized in Shōjo Comic magazine from 1984 to 1986 and later published in Japan in 12 tankōbon volumes by Shogakukan. The first volume was released on October 26, 1984, and the last on February 26, 1987. It was republished in seven bunkoban volumes, the first four on February 17, 1995, and final three on April 15, 1995.

No.	Japanese release date	Japanese ISBN
1	October 26, 1984	4-09-131651-4
2	January 26, 1985	4-09-131652-2
3	March 26, 1985	4-09-131653-0
4	May 25, 1985	4-09-131654-9
5	August 21, 1985	4-09-131655-7
6	October 26, 1985	4-09-131656-5
7	January 25, 1986	4-09-131657-3
8	April 26, 1986	4-09-131658-1
9	June 26, 1986	4-09-131659-X
10	August 20, 1986	4-09-131660-3
11	November 26, 1986	4-09-131851-7
12	February 26, 1987	4-09-131852-5

=== Albums ===
EMI Music released two albums for Purple Eyes in the Dark using songs written by Linda Hennrick. The first, Purple Eyes in the Dark (闇のパープルアイ), was released on March 20, 1986. Vocal tracks included performances by Shoko Yamagiwa, Derek Jackson, and Seki Mayumi. The second CD, Purple Eyes in the Dark: Part 2 (闇のパープルアイ PART-2), was released on January 27, 1993.

=== OVA ===
J.C. Staff and Youmex released the OVA adaptation of Purple Eyes in the Dark in 1987.

=== Novels ===
The series was adapted as a series of six light novels published by Shogakukan entitled Purple Eyes in the Dark Novel (小説 闇のパープル·アイ, Shousetsu Yami no Pāpuru Ai).

No.	Release date	ISBN
1	August 1991	978-4-09-420121-5
2	November 1991	978-4-09-420122-2
3	February 1992	978-4-09-420123-9
4	June 1992	978-4-09-420124-6
5	August 1992	978-4-09-420125-3
6	November 1992	978-4-09-420126-0

=== Live-action drama ===
The series was adapted into an 11-episode live-action television drama produced by Toei Company. It was broadcast on TV Asahi in Japan between July 1 and September 9, 1996.

== Reception ==
In 1987, Purple Eyes in the Dark was awarded the Shogakukan Manga Award for the shōjo manga category.
