= Chiho Saito =

Japanese manga artist

- Born: June 29, 1967 (age 59); Tokyo, Japan
- Occupation: Manga artist

Chiho Saito (さいとうちほ, Saitō Chiho; born 29 June 1967) is a Japanese manga artist, most noted for the manga Revolutionary Girl Utena. In 1996, she received the Shogakukan Manga Award for shōjo for Kanon. She is part of the Be-Papas manga artist collective.

Her debut work was "Ken to Madomoaseru" (The Sword and the Mademoiselle) in 1982. Her hobbies are dance, music, opera, and sumo.

== Works ==
- Anastasia Club (2001-2008)
- Waltz in a White Dress (円舞曲は白いドレスで, Walts wa Shiroi Dress de) (1990)
  - Lilac Nocturne (紫丁香夜想曲 LILAC NOCTURNE, Shiteikō Yazōkyoku: Lilac Nocturne) (1992)
  - Magnolia Waltz (白木蘭円舞曲) (1994)
  - Love Stories (恋物語, Koimonogatari) (1995)
- One Day, While Meeting a Knight (ある日、ナイトに会ったなら, Aru Hi, Naito ni Attanara)
  - Take Me Away, My Dear Knight (さらフてわたしのナイト, Saratte Watashi no Naito)
- Kanon (花音)
- Revolutionary Girl Utena (少女革命ウテナ) (1996–1997)
- First Girl (ファースト・ガール, Fāsuto Gāru)
- Basilis no Musume (バシリスの娘, Bashirisu no Musume)
- Beautiful (ビューティフル, Byūtifuru)
- Blue Apple Labyrinth (青りんご迷宮, Ao-Ringo Meikyū)
- Etoile Girl (エトワール・ガール, Etowāru Gāru)
- Sunset Love (目を閉じて愛, Hi o Tojite Ai)
- Honoka ni Purple (ほのかにパープル, Honaka ni Pāpuru; "A Hint of Purple")
- Dream Ballet (星を摘むドンナ, Hoshi o Tsumu Donna; "Pluck the Stars, Donna")
- Ice Forest (アイスフォレスト, Aisu Foresuto)
- The Flower Crown Madonna (花冠のマドンナ, Kakkan no Madonna)
- A Love Story in Shepherd Mount (小羊印のるんぱっぱ, Kohitsuji-jirushi no Runpappa)
- Place of Lovers (恋人たちの場所, Koibitotachi no Basho)
- Angel Tattoo (天使のTATTOO, Tenshi no Tattoo)
- Mo Hitori no Marionette (もう一人のマリオネット, Mō Hitori no Marionetto; "One More Marionette")
- Wait for Me at the Opera (オペラ座で待ってて, Opera-za de Mattete)
- Lady Masquerade (レディー・マスカレード, Redī Masukarēdo)
- The World Exists for Me (S&Mの世界, S&M no Sekai; "World of S&M") (Published in 2 English Short Story Volumes by Tokyopop)
- Key of Arabian Nights (千一夜の鍵, Senichiya no Kagi; "1,001 Keys")
- Bronze no Tenshi (ブロンズの天使, Buronzu no Tenshi; "Bronze Angel")
- Chat Noir no Shippo (シャ・ノワールのしっぽ, Sha Nowāru no Shippo; "Black Cat's Tail")
- Silver Wolf (銀の狼, Gin no Ōkami)
