= Romance of Darkness =

Japanese shōjo manga series by Chie Shinohara

- Cover of the third Japanese manga volume

水に棲む花 (Mizu ni Sumu Hana)
- Genre: Fantasy, horror, suspense
- Manga
- Written by: Chie Shinohara
- Published by: Shogakukan
- Imprint: Flower Comics
- Magazine: Betsucomi
- Original run: 2004 – 2005
- Volumes: 5
- Live-action film
- Directed by: Kenji Gotō
- Produced by: Keiichi Yamakawa; Tsutomu Yanagimura
- Written by: Mamiko Tokue
- Released: May 27, 2006
- Runtime: 84 minutes

Romance of Darkness (Japanese: 水に棲む花, Hepburn: Mizu ni Sumu Hana; lit. "Water-dwelling Flower") is a Japanese shōjo manga series written and illustrated by Chie Shinohara. It was serialized in Shogakukan's Betsucomi magazine from 2004 to 2005. Shogakukan collected the individual chapters into five bound volumes from June 2004 to March 2006. The series was adapted into a live-action feature film directed by Kenji Gotō and released in theaters in Japan on May 27, 2006.

== Plot ==
Rikka Nikaidō is a normal school girl whose life is thrown into chaos when her bus flips into a lake while on a school field trip. She is the sole survivor. Once she is released from the hospital, she tries to regain a regular life and even starts up swimming again. However, a black-haired woman attempts to attack Rikka repeatedly while in the water. She is Rikka Mizuchi, a girl who has lived for centuries with the help of a golden seed that her lover Izumi gave her every forty-nine years. This year, Izumi gave Rikka N. the seed, and Rikka M. is determined to kill the other Rikka before the girl is fully assimilated with water.

Yuzuru, Rikka N.'s weak, university student cousin she's loved since childhood, learns about the other Rikka. But it turns out that Yuruzu may not be so human after all.

A long, long time ago, there was a white dragon and a black dragon. They fought to see who would rule which part of the sky. And the white dragon fell, and the black dragon assumed he was dead, and soon forgot about him. But the white dragon had gone down to the humans and became one of them. A story told to the firstborn sons of the Nikaidō family, who have dragon blood running through their veins. One day, with the help of a female relative who would be named Rikka, the white dragon would be revived. As it turns out, the black dragon is Izumi and the white dragon's reincarnation is Yuzuru. However, he kept his feelings for Rikka a secret, because the way to revive the white dragon is through sex, where the white dragon would devour the girl's life. He tells her the way to revive the white dragon after rejecting her when they were about to have sex, Rikka already realizing that sex was how to revive him.

But as Izumi causes climate disasters, trying to force the white dragon to do something about it and fight him, Yuzuru refuses to devour Rikka in order to fight back. Rikka M. learns that she also has Nikaidō blood coursing through her, and offers herself to Yuruzu. Rikka N. stops her. As floods happen and the rain is boiling hot, Yuruzu asks if Rikka would give herself to him and she agrees. He devours her, and the white dragon is revived.

After going to the lake where the seed came from and freezing her, the white dragon and the black dragon finally have their rematch, the one Izumi wanted so desperately. When Rikka M. realizes that the white dragon and the black dragon have equal power, she offers herself to be devoured by Yuruzu, who agrees after nearly having his arm bit off by Izumi. With the new power, he defeats Izumi, and as the two go back to human form, Izumi is bleeding furiously from a neck bite, but Yuruzu refuses to finish him. As Izumi watches, Yuruzu grows two more golden seeds, and in turn, feeds them to Rikka M. and Rikka N. They come back to life.

When she learns that another seed won't expand Izumi's life, Rikka M. kills him as he yells for the white dragon to finish him. Yuruzu informs her that the lake's flowers will be in blossom all year, with golden seeds. She can take a seed any time she wants, and even live forever. Realizing she can live even longer than Izumi had, she leaves.

Yuruzu asks Rikka N. what she would like, and she tells him she just wants a normal life with him.

== Characters ==
- Rikka Nikaidō (二階堂 六花, Nikaidō Rikka)
- Rikka Mizuchi (水地 立夏, Mizuchi Rikka)
- Yuzuru Nikaidō (二階堂 楪, Nikaidō Yuruzu)
- Izumi (出水, Izumi)

== Live-action film ==
Cover of the Japanese DVD release

Romance of Darkness was adapted into a live-action feature film directed by Kenji Gotō and released in theaters in Japan on May 27, 2006. It starred Aki Maeda of Battle Royale fame as Rikka Nikaido, and Keiko Kitagawa of Pretty Guardian Sailor Moon and The Fast and the Furious: Tokyo Drift fame as Rikka Mizuchi. The film contains an original ending as the manga was still being serialized at the time. It was released on Region 2 DVD by Pony Canyon in Japan on September 20, 2006.
