= Ao no Fūin =

Japanese manga series

- First volume cover

蒼の封印
- Genre: Supernatural
- Manga
- Written by: Chie Shinohara
- Published by: Shogakukan
- Magazine: Shōjo Comic
- Original run: May 1991 – November 1994
- Volumes: 11
- Audio drama
- Episodes: 1
- Light novel
- Written by: Natsumi Yamamoto
- Illustrated by: Chie Shinohara
- Published by: KSS
- Imprint: KSS Comic Novels
- Original run: September 1998 – December 1998
- Volumes: 3

Ao no Fūin (蒼の封印; literally "Blue Seal") is a Japanese shōjo manga series by Chie Shinohara which was serialized in the manga magazine Shōjo Comic from issue 22 in 1991 until 1994. The story is about a beautiful high school girl, Sōko Kiryū, who finds out she is the latest reincarnation of Sōryū (usually called "Seiryū"), the demon queen who once ruled the earth with her demon armies. Unfortunately, she has fallen in love with a boy named Akira who is the reincarnation of Byakko, the legendary white tiger who is destined to kill her.

The story is loosely based on the tale of Four Gods in oriental cultures, namely the Azure Dragon (east), the White Tiger (west), the Black Turtle (north) and the Red Phoenix (south). Ao no Fūin was adapted into a CD drama in 1993 and three novels by Natsumi Yamamoto in 1998.

== Plot ==
The story is set in modern Japan. Sōko Kiryū is a beautiful first year transfer student in high school, having just moved into the area. Due to her uneasiness over the move, she has developed dizziness and fainting spells. Shortly after she transfers into the new school, she somehow causes a would-be rapist who attacks her in the infirmary to simply vanish, leaving his clothes on the floor.

About this time, a boy named Akira, later known as Byakko, appears at the school and begins pursuing her. He tells her that he is Byakko, the White Tiger of the West, and that he will kill her because she is the clone of the Demon Queen Soryū. With growing a horn, remembering a hunger for humans, and exhibiting unusual powers, Sōko is forced to accept that she is an oni even though she denies it. However, due to her growing feelings of love for Akira and her desire to become human, Sōko is determined to fight against this ill fate.

== Characters ==
Sōko Kiryū (桐生 蒼子, Kiryū Sōko)
The female protagonist of the story. She is a beautiful normal 16-year-old girl until the day that she transfers to her new school with fake memories of her life before. She meets Akira, who tries to kill her because she is the reincarnation of Soryu, of the family of the East and the queen of the demons (oni). She does not want to live like a demon and she tries to become a human with Akira's help. She falls in love with Akira early in the story and she gets depressed that she cannot be with him.
Akira Saionji (西園寺 彬, Sainoji Akira)
The antagonist/male protagonist of the story. He is the Byakko, of the family of the West with the task of killing Soryu. He falls in love with Sōko early in the story and tries by any means to turn her into a human. Only he has the power to defeat and kill Soryu but he cannot do that because of his feelings for her, thus betraying his family.
Takao Kiryū (桐生 高雄, Kiryū Takao)
Sōko's brother. He is later revealed to be the Genbu of the family of the North and the one that revived Sōko.
Hiko (緋子)
Shinobu Saionji (西園寺 忍, Saionji Shinobu)
Ryō Saionji (西園寺 椋, Saionji Ryō)
Kai Saionji (西園寺 楷, Saionji Kai)
Mayumi Saionji (西園寺 檀, Saionji Mayumi)

== Publications ==
=== Manga ===
The manga was serialized in Shōjo Comic from issue 22 in 1991 until 1994. There were 11 tankōbon volumes released under the Flower Comics label from Shogakukan which collected the series.

- Volume 1, ISBN 4-09-134321-X, May 1992
- Volume 2, ISBN 4-09-134322-8, August 1992
- Volume 3, ISBN 4-09-134323-6, November 1992
- Volume 4, ISBN 4-09-134324-4, February 1993
- Volume 5, ISBN 4-09-134325-2, May 1993
- Volume 6, ISBN 4-09-134326-0, August 1993
- Volume 7, ISBN 4-09-134327-9, December 1993
- Volume 8, ISBN 4-09-134328-7, April 1994
- Volume 9, ISBN 4-09-134329-5, July 1994
- Volume 10, ISBN 4-09-134330-9, September 1994
- Volume 11, ISBN 4-09-136251-6, November 1994

=== Bunkoban Re-release ===
Bunkoban editions were released under the Shogakukan Bunko label in 1999, collecting the series in seven volumes.

- Volume 1, ISBN 4-09-191123-4, February 1999
- Volume 2, ISBN 4-09-191124-2, February 1999
- Volume 3, ISBN 4-09-191125-0, April 1999
- Volume 4, ISBN 4-09-191126-9, April 1999
- Volume 5, ISBN 4-09-191127-7, May 1999
- Volume 6, ISBN 4-09-191128-5, May 1999
- Volume 7, ISBN 4-09-191129-3, May 1999

=== CD book ===
An audio drama CD was released on 26 May 1993, ISBN 4-09-907105-7, by Shogakukan.

=== Novels ===
A series of three novels by Natsumi Yamamoto and based on the manga was released by KSS in 1998.

- Volume 1, ISBN 4-87709-234-X, September 1998
- Volume 2, ISBN 4-87709-235-8, October 1998
- Volume 3, ISBN 4-87709-236-6, December 1998

== See also ==
- Fushigi Yûgi, a manga series based on the same legends.
