= World of the S&M =

Manga series

- Second manga volume cover.

SとMの世界 (S to M no Sekai)
- Genre: Historical fantasy
- Manga
- Written by: Kunihiko Ikuhara & Seinosuke Ito (Note: Jointly credited as Be-Papas.)
- Illustrated by: Chiho Saito
- Published by: Kadokawa Shoten (1st edition); Shogakukan (2014 reprint)
- English publisher: Tokyopop
- Imprint: Asuka Comics
- Magazine: Monthly Asuka
- Original run: August 2001 – February 2003
- Volumes: 2

World of the S&M (Japanese: SとMの世界, Hepburn: S to M no Sekai), released in English as The World Exists for Me, is a 2001 Japanese manga series. The series is written by Kunihiko Ikuhara with Seinosuke Ito (credited jointly as Be-Papas) and illustrated by Chiho Saito. The series is Ikuhara and Saito's second collaboration following the anime and manga series Revolutionary Girl Utena.

== Synopsis ==
Japanese high school student Sekai Maihime confesses her romantic feelings to her classmate Midou while on a school train tour through France. A mysterious boy named Sovieul appears, and the train suddenly derails; Sekai is knocked unconscious, and awakens transported back in time with Sovieul to 17th century France.

Sekai and Sovieul travel to the court of Louis XIV, where Sekai is accused of being a witch working for Madame de Montespan, Louis' mistress. In reality Montespan is working with Machiavellio, a man with the ability to jump through time who strongly resembles Midou. They again travel to the 15th century, where Sekai and Sovieul are captured by Gilles de Rais.

== Media ==
World of the S&M was created by Chiho Saito and Kunihiko Ikuhara, who previously collaborated on the anime and manga series Revolutionary Girl Utena as members of the artist collective Be-Papas. Seinosuke Ito is credited as a co-creator, while Kiwa Takado is credited as associate costume designer.

In Japan, World of the S&M was serialized in the manga magazine Monthly Asuka from August 2001 to February 2003. The series was collected into two bound volumes published by Kadokawa Shoten in 2002, and reprinted as a single volume by Shogakukan in 2014. In North America, the series is licensed by Tokyopop, which released the series as two volumes under the title The World Exists for Me.

No.	Original release date	Original ISBN	English release date	English ISBN
1	November 16, 2002	978-4049249163	December 13, 2005	978-1598160345
2	July 17, 2003	978-4049249460 (SE); ISBN 978-4048536554 (LE)	April 11, 2006	978-1598160352
1&2	November 15, 2014	978-4091914507		

== Reception ==
The series received mixed to negative reviews. Publishers Weekly called the series "flat and incoherent", arguing that "with more self-awareness, this magical historical romance could be a parody of goth-styled fantasy manga, but it's played all too straight." In her review for Anime News Network, writer Melissa Harper praised the series' artwork, but criticized its pace and lack of character development. Empty Movement hypothesized that the series' poor reception was due to its audience "looking for another Utena," noting that in contrast to Revolutionary Girl Utena, World of the S&M is "a fairly straight shoujo [manga]."
