= Red River (manga) =

Japanese manga series

- First tankōbon volume cover, featuring Yuri Suzuki

天は赤い河のほとり (Sora wa Akai Kawa no Hotori)
- Genre: Drama; Supernatural
- Manga
- Written by: Chie Shinohara
- Published by: Shogakukan
- English publisher: NA: Viz Media
- Imprint: Flower Comics
- Magazine: Shōjo Comic
- Original run: January 5, 1995 – June 5, 2002
- Volumes: 28
- Anime television series
- Directed by: Kōsuke Kobayashi
- Written by: Yoriko Tomita
- Music by: Yoshihisa Hirano
- Studio: Tatsunoko Production
- Licensed by: Crunchyroll
- Original network: Nippon TV, BS NTV
- Original run: July 8, 2026 – present
- Episodes: 20
- icon

Red River (Japanese: 天は赤い河のほとり, Hepburn: Sora wa Akai Kawa no Hotori; lit. 'The Sky Is on the Banks of the Red River'), also known as Anatolia Story, is a Japanese manga series written and illustrated by Chie Shinohara. It was published by Shogakukan in their Sho-Comi magazine from January 1995 to June 2002. It is published in English in North America by Viz Media.

As of March 2019, the manga had over 20 million copies in circulation, making it one of the best-selling manga series. In 2001, Red River won the Shogakukan Manga Award for the shōjo category.

An anime television series adaptation produced by Tatsunoko Production premiered in July 2026.

== Synopsis ==
The story takes place during the reign of King Suppiluliuma I, at a time when the Hittite Empire was near its peak in power, rivaled only by Egypt, which was then ruled by the young Pharaoh Tutankhamen. Many of the people and events in the story are drawn from actual history, from Princes Kail Mursili, Sari Arnuwanda, and Zannanza, to battles with the neighboring Mitanni kingdom around the town of Kizzuwatna.

Red River is about a fifteen-year-old Japanese girl named Yuri Suzuki, who time travels to Hattusa, the capital of the Hittite Empire in Anatolia. She was summoned by Queen Nakia who means to use Yuri as a human sacrifice. Yuri's blood is the key element needed in placing a curse upon the princes of the land so that they will perish, leaving Nakia's son as the sole heir to the throne. As the story progresses, however, Yuri not only repeatedly manages to escape Nakia's scheming, she also becomes revered as an incarnation of the goddess Ishtar and falls in love with prince Kail.

== Characters ==
=== Main ===
Yuri Suzuki (鈴木夕梨, Suzuki Yūri)
Voiced by: Mirai Tachibana
The main character of the story. Only fifteen at the start of the series, Yuri is willing to take up any charitable cause. As she possesses knowledge far greater than any woman of the time (such as recognition of iron, knowledge of 20th century hygiene and famous war strategies), and often seems to find herself in situations that "prove" she is Ishtar, she is considered to have divine powers and is thought by most to be the living incarnation of the goddess of love and war, Ishtar. As such, she is frequently referred to as Yuri Ishtar (ユーリ·イシュタル, Yūri Ishutaru). Despite this, Yuri is insecure and a tomboy; she generally prefers to dress in men's clothing for the sake of practicality, much to the consternation and dismay of her handmaids. The general opinion holds that she is "not strikingly beautiful" and "possesses little womanly charm" (although through the perseverance of her handmaids, she has sometimes been shown to be transformed into a stunning beauty). However, her natural charm, goodness, and selflessness win her the undying affection and loyalty of many people, both Hittites and their enemies. She is an accomplished gymnast who learns the arts of sword fighting and archery in order to protect herself and help Kail survive his stepmother's machinations.
Yuri falls in love with Kail early on in the story. Torn between her desire to return to her original time and her love for Kail, which he reciprocates, Yuri ultimately decides to remain in Anatolia forever. In a desperate attempt to overthrow Queen Nakia, she raises a private army and unites other factions loyal to her and Kail, and eventually succeeds in deposing Queen Nakia once and for all. She marries Kail and ascends to the title of Tawananna, the Hittite Queen.
Historically speaking, Yuri is most likely based on Puduhepa, the priestess of Ishtar who married King Hattusili III. She has been referred to as "one of the most influential women known from the Ancient Near East." She played an important role in diplomacy with Egypt and was a co-signatory in the Ulmi-Teshub treaty.
Kail Mursili (カイル・ムルシリ, Kairu Murusiri)
Voiced by: Wataru Katoh
He is the third prince of the Hittite empire, son of King Suppililiuma and the second Tawananna, Queen Hinti. He is described as attractive and beautiful. At the beginning of the series, he finds Yuri attempting to escape from Nakia's guards, and gives her the gift of understanding and speaking their language by way of a kiss. He rescues Yuri from being used as a sacrifice for the god Teshub by claiming to have taken her virginity, and takes her as a concubine to keep up appearances. He finds Yuri to be quite unlike any woman he has ever met, and promises to help her find a way home to Japan. However, he soon begins to struggle with his own growing love and desire for her. He initially calls Yuri his concubine and the incarnation of Ishtar in order to protect her from Queen Nakia, but eventually begins to believe his own tale as the legend of Yuri as Ishtar and his feelings towards her evolve beyond his control.
Kail is loyal to those he cares for, but is constantly at odds with his stepmother, the third Tawananna, Queen Nakia. Her desire to make her son, Prince Juda, the heir to the throne is the prime motivation behind Kail's search for a woman whom he can love unconditionally and who has the qualities of a true queen. A powerful priest and sorcerer in his own right, he has the ability to control wind and air, and is one of the few who can counter Nakia's spells. Halfway through the series (Volume 12), he ascends to the throne as King Mursili II. His utmost devotion to his country and his people is the reason behind their loyalty to him. He is a strong, charismatic tactician, and as King, he endeavors to put an end to any wars and establish a peaceful age for his nation.

=== Enemies ===
Queen Nakia (ナキア皇妃（皇太后）, Nakia-ōhi (Kōtaigō))
Voiced by: Aya Uchida
The third and current Tawananna (queen) of the Hittite Empire. A former princess of Babylonia, Nakia was sent to Suppililiuma at the age of 15 in exchange for monetary aid. Desperately lonely and jealous of the emperor's second wife Queen Hinti, Nakia offered all of her jewelry to Urhi and begged him to escape with her to start a new life. When he claimed he could not give her the life and children she deserved, she reluctantly "fulfilled her duty" and gave birth to Prince Juda. Because Juda bore little to no resemblance to Suppililiuma, Nakia dedicated her life to ensuring that he assumed the Hittite throne by any means necessary.
It was Nakia's spell that took Yuri from her original time frame, and she intended to use Yuri's blood as part of a curse to kill the five princes ahead of her son in line for the throne. Foiled by Prince Kail in her initial attempts to secure Yuri, Nakia constantly and shamelessly manipulates people and situations to her benefit. Her schemings come to an end, however, when her son Juda publicly attacks her for her evil deeds, renouncing the royal throne; she is subsequently deposed and placed under his supervision.
Nakia is a high priestess, and she has control over water, using certain kinds of enchanted water as a form of mind control. The character is loosely based on the historical Tawananna Mal-Nikal of Babylon.
Urhi Shalma (ウルヒ シャルマ)
Voiced by: Kōji Yusa
Nakia's personal servant, an assassin who usually takes the guise of a royal priest. He takes advantage of his position and his uncommonly feminine appearance to gain the trust of people to be used in Nakia's plots against Yuri and Prince Kail. His surname is not well known, and is used when he chooses to go incognito. Under his robes, he hides a number of whipping scars. In Volume 11, he loses an eye to Rusafa and wears an ornate eyepatch for most of the rest of the series. He eventually commits suicide to avoid being interrogated by Kail's group.
A former member of a royal family, Urhi's nation was invaded and destroyed when he was a young boy. Taken captive by the invading nation's commander, he was savagely beaten (leaving the scars on his back), raped and later castrated to ensure that his family's bloodline would not continue. He arrived in Hattusa after being purchased to serve as a priest in the seraglio temple.
Urhi is initially rumored to be the true father of Prince Juda; this is proven false when his castration is revealed. However, he and Nakia did share a strong romantic interest in each other.
Prince Mattiwaza (Kuro, The Prince of Darkness or Shattiwaza) (マッティワザ（黒太子）, (Kurotaisi))
Voiced by: Kohsuke Toriumi
The crown prince of the Mitanni kingdom, son of King Tushratta, and younger brother of Nefertiti. Called the "Prince of Darkness" for his ruthless demeanor and behavior at war, he launches a campaign against the Hittites and kidnaps Yuri in an attempt to demoralize them. This strategy fails, as the Mitanni people rally around Yuri when she tends to the injured and sick in the capital, and even Mattiwaza himself is eventually won over by Yuri's charm. When the Mitanni kingdom is overrun by the Hittites and the king murdered by his own soldiers, Mattiwaza releases Yuri, abdicates the throne, and departs with his head concubine Nadia. In volume 23, having received a pardon from Kail, Mattiwaza returns as an ally of the Hitties against the Egyptians and is now the new ruler of the Mitanni kingdom.
During her captivity, Mattizawa reveals to Yuri that his sister Tatukia was sold to the Egyptians to be a queen, and is now known as Nefertiti. Though Mattiwaza and Tatukia were siblings, they had an affair when younger. Her change from a caring sister and lover to a cold and calculating schemer had a severe effect on Mattizawa; while he ruled his people with intelligence and consideration, he felt no compassion for the lives and feelings of others – until he met Yuri. The jewel Mattiwaza wears of his forehead is a memento of his love for his sister, and it is passed on to Yuri, who wears it around her neck for much of the rest of the series until she gave it away to Nefertiti who later used it as part of her unfinished bust.
The character is loosely based on the historical Shattiwaza of Mitanni, who was actually the brother of Tushratta and uncle of Tadukhipa, who is sometimes erroneously identified with Nefertiti.
Nefertiti (Tatukia or Tadukhipa)
Voiced by: Mariya Ise
A famous queen of Egypt, once a princess of Mitanni, and the blood sister of Mattiwaza, with whom she had an affair when they were younger. She was sold to Egypt to solidify the legitimacy of the Mitanni kingdom, and was married to Amenhotep IV (Akhenaten). In many ways she is the Egyptian counterpart of Queen Nakia: a powerful and influential schemer working for her own desires, not for the welfare of the people or the nation. It is suggested that she has her hand in Tutankhamen's death, and she also conspires with Nakia for the downfall of the Hittite empire.
Nefertiti is a fictionalized conflation of the historical Tadukhipa and Nefertiti. Modern Egyptologists are of the opinion that these women were two different wives of Akhenaten.
In the English version, instead of the more conforming version of her name listed above, the spelling 'Tatukia' is used.
Zuwa
Voiced by: Yasuhiro Mamiya
The leader of the fierce Kashuga (Kaska) tribe, who works for Queen Nakia. Larger than the average man, he is also very bloodthirsty and sadistic, collecting the skins of his human victims, much like a hunter would collect the skins of animals, and crafting his attire from them. After killing Tito, he meets his end, outmaneuvered and outsmarted, by Yuri's hands, who shatters his outsized copper sword and the mud bricks beneath his feet with an iron blade, causing him to fall to his death from the palace walls.

=== Royalty ===
King Suppililiuma
Voiced by: Masaki Terasoma
The ruler of the Hittites, by the beginning of the story he is already advanced in years. He has fought several wars with the Mitanni and the Egyptians, and his reign is considered to be a high point in the history of the people. He later falls victim to the Seven Day Fever.
Queen Hinti
The late second wife of King Suppiluliuma and Kail's mother. From the flashbacks and mentionings scattered throughout the story, she is depicted as a gentle, caring queen and mother. She was murdered by Nakia so that she could usurp the position of Tawananna.
Sari Arnuwanda
Voiced by: Daisuke Ono
The Crown Prince, oldest son of King Suppiluliuma and the King's first wife. Largely invalid, he relies heavily on his brothers, specifically Zannanza and Kail, in order to fulfill his duties. After he ascends to the throne, he in turn picks Kail to be his heir, as he has no sons. Shortly afterwards, he is assassinated by Urhi and Yuri gets accused for his murder; however, Ursula takes the blame and sacrifices herself to clear Yuri's name.
Zannanza Hattusili (ザナンザ・ハットゥシリ, Zananza Hattoushiri)
Voiced by: Shōya Chiba
The fourth son of King Suppiluliuma (with a palace maid), he is very skilled with swords and military tactics, and is the mayor of the Hittite city of Kadesh. Prince Zannanza is very fond of Kail, whom he regards as a full brother, and he was also raised by Kail's mother after his own mother died. He also falls in love with Yuri, which unfortunately is exploited by Queen Nakia. Zannanza is very loyal to Kail, and despite his feelings, does not try to get in the way of the relationship between Kail and Yuri. He is betrothed to Ankhesenamen, the widow of Tutankhamen, in an attempt to make peace between the Hittites and Egypt, but never arrives at his destination, getting assassinated en route. Only Yuri, who accompanied him, escapes to bring news of his death.
Juda Haspasrupi
Voiced by: Shun Horie
The sixth son of King Suppiluliuma and the current Tawananna, Queen Nakia. Despite his mother's constant and blatantly evil scheming, Prince Juda is a kind boy who does not understand his mother's enmity towards his beloved brothers, particularly his favorite, Kail. He has a strong interest in astronomy, and despite his (for modern times comparatively) young age (14 when he is first introduced) he is mentioned to have at least one wife and two concubines. His dream is to serve as a domestic advisor to Kail, whom he wishes to become king, and he thinks of Yuri as an older sister.
Juda falls victim to his mother's schemes quite often, but he is an unwilling pawn who must be controlled by magic to cooperate. When he eventually discovers the truth behind his mother's schemes, he attempts suicide by drinking poison from his mother's potion chamber, but later recovers after Nakia used an antidote to save him. He later tries to slay his mother for attempted murder upon Yuri in a fit of rage, permanently renouncing his right of succession to the throne as his protest against Nakia and his support for Yuri and Kail, before Yuri and Kail intervene.
Rois Telipinu
The second son of King Suppililiuma (with a concubine), he is not considered to be one of the serious claimants to the throne and is largely relegated to royal ceremonies. He is the mayor of the Hittite city of Haleb.
Mali Piyasili
The fifth son of King Suppililiuma and mayor of Karkemish. He is stabbed by Ramses in battle and later dies from his wounds.
Nepis Ilra
Kail's older half-sister and a priestess. She is blind from birth. She also performs a ritual cleansing for Yuri and Kail, but it is interrupted by Nakia, who delivered the final attempt against the two by creating a whirlpool to transport Yuri to an unknown destination.

=== Servants ===
Tito (ティト, Tito)
Voiced by: Maki Kawase
Yuri's first true friend after her arrival in Anatolia. Tito is a servant in the palace, but also the only son of Talos, the head of the Hatti clan, and the inheritor of the secret of iron-making. While helping Yuri escape from Queen Nakia, he is murdered by Nakia's servant, Zuwa. Ultimately, it is her desire to avenge Tito's death that causes Yuri to stay even when given the chance of returning home; however, little did she know, Nakia actually arranged for Tito's death to sway Yuri into staying and attempting to avenge Tito so she can resume targeting Yuri. Yuri is framed for the death, and his sisters attempt to kill her in retaliation. Tito is finally avenged when Yuri defeats Zuwa and reveals him as the true killer. In gratitude, Talos granted Tito's inheritance to Yuri, and Tito's sisters take his place in the royal household.
Hadi (ハディ, Hadi)
Voiced by: Shiki Aoki
The eldest sister of Tito, she is an intelligent and skilled fighter. Manipulated by Urhi, she and her sisters tried to kill Yuri in order to avenge Tito's death, but after finding out the truth, they pledge their lives as Yuri's handmaids. Though Hadi admires Yuri for her bravery and kindness, her attempts to get Yuri to be more traditionally feminine have very mixed results.
Ryui and Shala
Voiced by: Natsumi Kawaida (Ryui), Misato Matsuoka (Shala)
Twin sisters of Hadi and Tito, both loyal and capable fighters in their own right. Along with Hadi, they pledge their lives as Yuri's loyal handmaids. Both of them often conspire with Hadi and Kikkuri to draw Kail and Yuri closer together, and eventually, both Ryui and Shala become romantically involved with Kikkuri, due to similar tastes and personalities.
Kikkuri (キックリ, Kikkuri)
Voiced by: Tomohiro Ōno
Prince Kail's servant, who goes everywhere with him. Though quite cautious and timid by nature, he is not above conspiring with Yuri's handmaids and working behind Kail's back in order to encourage him to "settle down" with Yuri. In an omake chapter at the end of the story, he writes a horse care manual that is in modern day times discovered in the ruins of the old Hittite empire. The character is loosely based on historical Kikkuli, the master horse trainer of the land Mitanni.
Ilbani (イル・バーニ, Iru Bāni)
Voiced by: Tomoaki Maeno
Prince Kail's strategic adviser, foster brother, palace steward, and childhood friend. Though very serious and formal, Ilbani has a dry wit and an insatiable urge to find a wife for Prince Kail. At first, unsure of Yuri's intentions and suitability, he quickly decides that Yuri is the perfect wife for Kail and the best possible candidate to unseat Nakia as Tawananna. He is one of the few people to consistently see through Queen Nakia's plots and has been known to manipulate Urhi to benefit his counter schemes. He is also very resourceful; at one time, Yuri states that the reason why Ilbani is so trusted is because he can "find advantages in the most outrageous situations." His loyalty to Kail and Yuri often seems rooted in a greater loyalty to the Hittite nation on the whole.
Ursula (ウルスラ, Urusura)
Voiced by: Nana Mizuki
Initially used as a pawn by Queen Nakia, she is introduced as a false Ishtar in a town ravaged by the Seven Day Fever. When exposed by Prince Kail and subsequently forgiven, she joins Yuri's retinue as a handmaid. She falls in love with Kash, and they become betrothed, but she ultimately sacrifices her life for Yuri when Yuri is falsely accused of the assassination of King Arnuwanda so to clear Yuri's name. Before her execution, she gives her hair to Kash, who wears her braid as his headband until the day Urhi is revealed as the true assassin.

=== Hittite generals and military leaders ===
Rusafa
Voiced by: Junya Enoki
The leader of the Hittite archers, he is highly loyal to Yuri and Kail. Free-spirited and easygoing, he nevertheless falls under Nakia's control at one point. His name is often translated as "Lucifer" due to the ambiguity of the katakana used in the original Japanese.
Rusafa's unrequited love for Yuri makes him go out of his way to protect her, even if it means disobeying orders from his superiors. When he finds that Kail and Yuri are already in love (at which point he too loves her), he is somewhat dismayed when Kail announces marriage. Just as Kash keeps Ursula's hair as a keepsake, Rusafa wears the obsidian sliver Yuri had passed to him to save his life in volume 17 around his neck as a sign of his devotion for her. After meeting him, Hathor Nefert (Ramses' sister) falls in love with him even though she is aware that he is in love with Yuri. However, before he dies, he seems to have been developing feelings of respect and admiration for Nefert. Rusafa is killed by Nakia at her final attempt at the lives of Yuri and Kail, thereby stopping Nakia for good.
Kash
Voiced by: Haruki Ishiya
The leader of the Hittite chariots, and a guard of Prince Kail. He falls in love with Ursula not long after she comes to live in the palace. Following her execution, he wears a braided band made from her hair around his head.
Mittannamuwa
Voiced by: Shinichiro Kamio
The leader of the Hittite infantry, he does not play much of a role in palace politics, as he is considerably older and spends most of his time out in the field.
Shubas
The second commander of the Hittite archers, he is first introduced in book thirteen of the series, having gone to war with Egypt along with Mursili II, as Shubas' superior officer is serving the second army in Arzawa with Yuri. Like his fellow officer Zora, he seems to be largely inexperienced at first, a fact remarked upon by Kikkuri.
Zora (ゾラ, Zora)
The second commander of the Hittite infantry, he is first introduced in book thirteen of the series, having gone to war with Egypt along with Mursili II, as Zora's superior officer is serving the second army in Arzawa with Yuri. Like his fellow officer Shubas, he seems to be largely inexperienced at first, a fact remarked upon by Kikkuri.
In Volume 20, it is discovered that critical information is being leaked from behind the Hittite lines to Egyptian forces. Zora is discovered to be the informant; however, it is to Queen Nakia that he is submitting the information to, who in turn has been forwarding it to the Egyptians. When confronted, Zora said that in exchange for this deed, he had been promised a promotion, citing jealousy against Shubas, who had been promoted while Zora had not, despite the two of them being close friends and having entered the Hittite armies at roughly the same time.

=== Egyptians ===
User Ramses
Voiced by: Soma Saito
A military officer from a noble family. In the manga and its anime adaptation, he is easily distinguished by his heterochromatic eyes (the left one is sepia, the right one is golden) and blond hair. He has a lot of sisters, most chiefly among them Nefert. His name is sometimes romanized as Usr Ramses.
Ramses initially encounters Yuri while on patrol near the Egyptian-Hittite border awaiting Zannanza's caravan. He is intrigued by Yuri's ingenuity and bravery in preventing a war between Egypt and the Hittites following Zannanza's assassination, and requests to be assigned to Hattusa as a military liaison. When he later kidnaps Yuri, he reveals his true motives, planning to become the next Egyptian pharaoh by ousting the current, corrupt leaders of the Egyptian 18th Dynasty. To do this, he needs a woman of his own caliber, like Yuri, to be his future queen.
His first and second attempts to kidnap her are foiled by Kail. A third attempt is successful when a desperate Rusafa seeks his help when Yuri is weakened and in danger of dying after a shipwreck which also causes her to have a miscarriage. After Rusafa escapes Egypt and informs Kail that Yuri actually survives the shipwreck, Kail sends Ilbani, Hadi, Ryui, and Shala to Egypt. By this time, Ramses, who had initially only wanted Yuri because of his ambitions, has truly fallen in love with her. But soon after Kail's servants arrive, Egyptian soldiers come to arrest Yuri for interfering with an official's attempt to cut off the hand of a child. Ramses takes Yuri's stead as he is held prisoner in Queen Nefertiti's palace. After Yuri rescues him from death at Queen Nefertiti's hands, he gives Yuri vital information which concerns Queen Nakia's betrayal before she returns to Kail.
Later, Ramses and Kail fight to a draw at the Battle of Kadesh at the Orontes River, and Ramses accepts defeat and asks Yuri to bear a daughter to marry his son (a wish which does not actually come to pass, but is finally consummated by their grandchildren). He later becomes Ramses I, first Pharaoh of the Egyptian 19th Dynasty. (In actual history, Ramses was known as Paramessu prior to succeeding Horemheb, the historical pharaoh of this period. The actual User Ramses would be Ramses II, a contemporary of Mursilli II's son, Muwatalli, and during whose reign the actual Battle of Kadesh occurred, which eventually resulted in the oldest known peace treaty, the Ramses–Hattusili Treaty.)
Hathor Nefert
The oldest of Ramses younger sisters is a free-spirited and flirtatious personality. During the time when Yuri is in captivity in Egypt, Nefert comes to view her as a little sister. She also takes a romantic interest in Rusafa even though she is aware that he is in love with Yuri, and after Rusafa dies, she is shown grieving for him. Like Ramses, she has blonde hair, though she wears a black wig to look more native.
Ankhesenamen
Voiced by: Anna Nagase
The daughter of Nefertiti and the wife of Tutankhamen. When Tutankhamen dies, her hand in marriage is offered to a son of the Hittite king, but this deal is never completed due to treachery, and she is married off to a high-level government official, Ay.
Horemheb
Voiced by: Taiten Kusunoki
The pharaoh who rules Egypt by the time Yuri arrives there (volume 20 of the series). In the series, he is actually a weak puppet king under Nefertiti's control.
Ay
A formerly a high-level (though largely incompetent) government official, he ascends to the position of Pharaoh after the failure of Ankhesenamen's arranged marriage to the Hittite Empire. Ramses sees him as a personification of the corruption of the Egyptian 18th Dynasty, having married a girl "young enough to be his granddaughter".

=== Animals ===
Aslan
Yuri's black war horse, whom only Yuri can ride or control. (In volume 13, Aslan is referred to as a "she," which may – or may not – be different from the original translation.) His name is Turkish for "lion"; in the mythology surrounding her, Ishtar as a goddess is said to have ridden a lion into battle.
Shimshek
Yuri's hawk, raised by her from a chick. He is usually kept in a wicker basket when not out.

=== Characters from Yuri's time ===
Yuri's family
In modern-day Japan, Yuri has a mother (voiced by Minami Takayama), father (voiced by Kazuhiko Inoue), and two sisters, Eimi (詠美) (younger, voiced by Maki Kawase) and Marie (毬絵) (older, voiced by Umeka Shōji). Very little is shown of them beyond the initial pages of the manga, but it is assumed they are a normal Japanese family. In volume 28 it is revealed that several of Yuri's daughters and granddaughters were named after her sisters.
Satoshi Himuro (氷室 聡, Himuro Satoshi)
Voiced by: Hiroki Nanami
Satoshi Himuro is a classmate and long-time friend of Yuri. Towards the beginning of the story, Satoshi and Yuri had just officially become a couple: the story opens with their first kiss. While they were out on a date, Yuri is dragged into the past by Nakia's magic. Yuri misses Satoshi for the first few months in Anatolia, but his memory fades gradually with time.
In a short comic included in the fan-book, it is revealed Satoshi has become a professor of Hittite history, and is married to Yuri's younger sister, Eimi. While excavating the tomb of Ishtar at Hattusa, his grad students uncover tablets recording the exploits of Mursili II and his Tawananna Ishtar, written by Illvani's son. This short comic unofficially closes the storyline.

=== Others ===
Talos
Voiced by: Takashi Matsuyama
The headman of the Hatti people, keeper of the secret of iron making, and father to Hadi, Ryui, Shala, and Tito. He is one of the first to see the true potential in Yuri, "proving" her claim as Ishtar by asking her to pick a blade from his armory. Following Yuri's battle against Zuwa, Talos swears his loyalty to Yuri while entrusting her and Kail with his clan's greatest secret in iron mining and forging.
Nadia
Voiced by: Ruriko Aoki
The head concubine of Prince Mattiwaza, and younger sister of Queen Nakia. She initially plans to trick Mattiwaza into killing Yuri, but only because she was afraid of being replaced. Though long suspected of being a spy for Queen Nakia or her birth kingdom of Babylonia, she has no intention of being Nakia's pawn, as she is genuinely in love with Mattiwaza, and even defends him with her life (which ultimately saves Mattiwaza and Yuri themselves as well). Her selfless act redeems Mattiwaza, and they flee to Babylonia to seek out for a new life together. Following Mattiwaza's reinstatement as Mittani's king by Kail, she has likely since become his queen.
Guzel
Voiced by: Saori Hayami
The daughter of the chairman of the Hittite senate, who claims her son is Prince Kail's while under the control of Queen Nakia. A gentle and understanding person, and previously one of the leading candidates to become Kail's queen, she is still a close friend to Kail and has also come to appreciate Yuri as the only one Kail would ever take for his wife. Her son, whose father was actually a traveling minstrel, was named after Kail.
Alexandra
The first princess of Arzawa (a country to the west of the Hittites on the shores of the Aegean Sea), Alexandra is sent by her mother to surrender herself to Ishtar as a concubine, not realizing that Ishtar is actually female. After Arzawa made an alliance with the Hittites, Alexandra, who has come to adore Yuri, spends a great deal of time in the Hittite kingdom and later becomes the love interest for Prince Juda.
Alexandra is about 13 years old when she is first seen in volume 13 of the series. In a slight difference to the Japanese edition, probably changed to appeal more to an American audience, the manga translation only mentions that Alexandra has been sent to "serve" Ishtar, not that she has been sent as a concubine.
Turgu
The youngest brother of Nakia and Nadia. He was the father of Ishin Saura, one of potential canditates as Kail's concubine. When his daughter was murdered by Princess Adda Charlato, not only Turgu suspects Nakia's involvement with the deaths of Kail's potential concubines canditates, but he is shocked to learn that Nakia was responsible behind Hinti's death. Nakia forced Turgu to remain silent for the sake of Babylonia.

== Media ==
=== Manga ===
Written and illustrated by Chie Shinohara, Red River was serialized in the bimonthly manga anthology Shōjo Comic from January 5, 1995, to June 5, 2002, with its chapters collected and published by Shogakukan in 28 tankōbon volumes and later republished in 16 bunkobon volumes. Viz Media announced on February 13, 2004, that they had acquired the series for an English-language release in North America, with Volume 1 released on May 26 of that same year, and volume 28 released on January 12, 2010. They released the series digitally from March 19 to October 15, 2013. On February 2, 2024, Viz Media announced that they would begin releasing 3-in-1 omnibus versions of the manga, with the first volume released on October 15, 2024.

Red River is also published in Vietnam by Tre Publishing House, in Germany by Egmont Manga & Anime, and in Italy by Star Comics.

=== Drama CDs ===
The series was adapted as a series of 8 drama CDs released in two "seasons" between 1997 and 2003. The cast for said drama CD series is as follows:

- Yuri Ishtar: Minami Takayama
- Kail Mursili: Kazuhiko Inoue
- Queen Nakia: Yuriko Yamaguchi, later Misa Watanabe
- Urhi Shalma: Katsumi Toriumi, later Takahiro Sakurai
- Prince Mattiwaza: Kenyuu Horiuchi
- Juda Haspasrupi: Ikue Ohtani
- Tito: Hiro Yuuki
- Ilbani: Haruki Sayama
- Hadi: Ai Orikasa
- Ryuhi: Chiemi Chiba, later Machiko Toyoshima
- Shala: Yukiko Fujikawa
- Ramses: Toshihiko Seki, later Takehito Koyasu
- Kikkuri: Tomokazu Seki
- Ursula: Yuko Nagashima
- Kash: Koji Yusa, later Hideo Ishikawa
- Zannanza: Hikaru Midorikawa
- Guzel: Miyuki Ishizuka

=== Books ===
An art book for Red River was released on February 24, 1999 (ISBN 4-09-199613-2), and a fan-book on July 26, 2002 (ISBN 4-09-135782-2).

Five novels based on the manga have been released, written and illustrated by Shinohara:

No.	Title	Release date	ISBN
1	Sora wa Akai Kawa no Hotori Gaiden: Ma ga Jidai no Reimei (天は赤い河のほとり外伝 〜魔が時代の黎明〜)	May 24, 2007 (First edition: May 29, 2007)	978-4-09-452006-4
2	Sora wa Akai Kawa no Hotori Gaiden: Zoku Ma ga Jidai no Reimei (天は赤い河のほとり外伝 〜続 魔が時代の黎明〜)	August 31, 2007 (First edition: September 5, 2007)	978-4-09-452020-0
3	Sora wa Akai Kawa no Hotori Gaiden: Saku no Tsuki (天は赤い河のほとり外伝 朔の月)	October 1, 2008 (First edition: October 6, 2008; originally scheduled for April)	978-4-09-452063-7
4	Sora wa Akai Kawa no Hotori Gaiden: Mayuzuki (天は赤い河のほとり外伝 眉月)	January 26, 2010 (First edition: January 31, 2010)	978-4-09-452144-3
5	Sora wa Akai Kawa no Hotori Gaiden: Jōgen (天は赤い河のほとり外伝 上弦)	June 25, 2010 (First edition: June 30, 2010)	978-4-09-452158-0

=== Anime ===
An anime television series adaptation was announced on February 15, 2026. It is produced by Tatsunoko Production and directed by Kōsuke Kobayashi, with series composition by Yoriko Tomita, characters designed by Kenji Fujisaki, and music composed by Yoshihisa Hirano. The series premiered on July 8, 2026, on Nippon TV's AnichU programming block and BS NTV, (Note: Nippon TV listed the series premiere on July 7 at 25:29, which is effectively July 8 at 1:29 a.m. JST.) and will run for two consecutive cours. The first opening theme song is "Akatsuki no Sora" (暁の空; Dawn Sky), performed by Hiroki Nanami, while the first ending theme song is "Reunion", performed by Miisha Shimizu. The second opening theme song is "Akatsuki no Hoshi" (暁の星; Morning Star), performed by Nana Mizuki, while the second ending theme song is "flow", performed by Ryu Matsuyama featuring Yuko Ando. Crunchyroll is streaming the series.

==== Episodes ====
No.	Title	Directed by (Note: Production staff information is taken from the ending credits of each episode.)	Written by	Storyboarded by	Original release date
1	"A Goodbye Kiss, A Hello Kiss"; Transliteration: "Wakare to Deai no Kisu" (Japanese: 別れと出会いのキス)	Kōsuke Kobayashi	Yoriko Tomita	Kōsuke Kobayashi	July 8, 2026
Yuri Suzuki has just begun seriously dating her boyfriend Satoshi Himuro when a mysterious force suddenly drags her into a void of water. After emerging from the water, Yuri finds herself in a strange city, and soldiers chase after her, but she comes across a man named Prince Kail, who helps her hide by pretending to make out with her; his kiss enables her to understand his language. Yuri runs off, but is caught by the soldiers, who bring her to Queen Nakia, the woman who brought her here. Nakia reveals that she plans to use Yuri as a human sacrifice to kill the princes of the realm so her own son will inherit the throne. Just before the sacrifice, Kail intervenes, claiming that Yuri is unsuitable because he has already taken her virginity, and leaves with her. When Kail questions her about her origin, Yuri is shocked to learn that she has been abducted to the ancient Hittite Empire, thousands of years in the past.
2	"The Black Water"; Transliteration: "Kuroi Mizu" (Japanese: 黒い水)	Hiroshi Itō	Yoriko Tomita	Kōsuke Kobayashi	July 15, 2026
After Yuri tells Kail about Nakia's conspiracy, he brings Yuri to his palace, where Yuri befriends his servant Tito, who tells her that only Nakia can send her home. Tito is then possessed by the Black Water, a substance controlled by Nakia, and tries to kill Yuri. Kail thwarts the assassination, frees Tito from Nakia's control, and heals Yuri's wounds. They later learn that Tito is scheduled to be executed for attacking a noble, even though it wasn't his fault, and stop the execution, settling for a lesser punishment. Yuri learns that she needs her original clothes to return home, and she and Tito impulsively sneak into Nakia's palace to retrieve them. However, since Nakia has been scrying her, Yuri is captured by Zuma, one of Nakia's servants. As Nakia prepares to sacrifice Yuri again, Tito saves her, and Yuri regains her clothes. When Zuma catches up with them, Tito sacrifices himself to enable Yuri's escape.
3	"I Can't Go Back, I Won't Go Back"; Transliteration: "Kaeranai, Kaerenai" (Japanese: 還らない, 還れない)	Hideaki Uehara	Yoriko Tomita	Hiroaki Shimura	July 22, 2026
Kail escorts Yuri into Nakia's palace to help Tito, but Nakia denies knowing anything about him. Still desperate to save Tito, Kail and Yuri decide to see Kail's father and meet Ilbani, the palace's steward and Kail's foster brother. The next day, Tito's flayed body is found, which devastates Yuri. Ilbani and Kail prepare to return Yuri home; however, Zuwa and his Kashugas disrupt the ritual, and Yuri chooses to stay instead of going back to her time, as she wishes to avenge Tito, just as Nakia had planned. They later learn that the Kashugas have launched an attack on the city of Alinna, Tito's home town, and Kail is sent out to repel them. Nakia arranged this attack to deprive Yuri of Kail's protection, but suspecting this, Kail lets Yuri accompany him by introducing her as an incarnation of Ishtar, the goddess of war, to justify her presence. Meanwhile, Nakia's servant Urhi informs Tito's sisters Hadi, Ryui, and Shala about Tito's death and falsely accuses Yuri, prompting them to plan revenge on her.
4	"Ishtar Incarnate"; Transliteration: "Ishutaru no Keshin" (Japanese: イシュタルの化身)	Yasuhiro Minami	Gō Zappa	Yasuhiro Minami	July 29, 2026
Yuri, Kail, and his army travel to Alinna. After meeting Hadi, Ryui, and Shala, Kail leaves for battle, and Tito's sisters lure Zuwa to Yuri. Yuri unintentionally rides a black horse onto the battlefield to escape from Zuwa, confusing the Kashugas and allowing Kail's army to drive them back. Following the battle, Alinna's mayor awards Yuri the black horse, Aslan. Meanwhile, Urhi gives Hadi and her sisters a vial containing sleeping poison. As Kail attempts to have sex with Yuri, Hadi, Ryui and Shala ambush them and attempt to force Yuri to drink the poison. Kail reveals the truth to the sisters, but Hadi unfortunately poisons Yuri, and Yuri goes unconscious. After Urhi and Zuwa abducted Yuri, she wakes up early and escapes, only to run into an old man with an axe.
5	"A Sword to Fight"; Transliteration: "Tatakau Tamenoni Ken o" (Japanese: 戦うためのに剣を)	Kenichirō Watanabe	Yoriko Tomita	Kenichirō Watanabe	August 5, 2026
The old man reveals himself as Talos, Tito's father, and brings Yuri to his workshop. After being instructed to choose a weapon to fight Zuwa, Yuri picks an iron dagger, which proves to Talos that she is Ishtar, whom his clan supports. Fighting atop the city walls, Yuri shatters Zuwa's sword and the crenel he's standing on with her dagger, making Zuwa fall to his death. Hadi, Ryui and Shala, who finally learn the truth behind Tito's death, become Yuri's handmaids, while Talos swears his loyalty to Yuri and entrusts her and Kail with his clan's greatest secret: the art of iron mining and forging. The Hittites prepare for an upcoming war against the Mitanni, and Kail's brother Zannanza arrives to help. Kail reveals to Yuri his goals in bringing peace for his kingdom, but he also secretly longs to make her his future queen. Meanwhile, Nakia continues her scheming.
6	"The One I Can't Love"; Transliteration: "Suki ni Natsu wa Ikenai Hito" (Japanese: 好きになつはいけないひと)	Hiroshi Itō & Tatsuhiko Komatsu	Yasuko Kamo	Kō Matsuzono	August 12, 2026
At a party at Hattusa's palace, Yuri is on Nakia's insistence formally introduced to the royal family. Nakia quickly notices that Zannanza, who is yet unattached, has taken an interest in Yuri and doses him with her enchanted Rose Water, which makes him become amorous towards Yuri, to incite a conflict between the princes. Zannanza kidnaps Yuri and takes her to the southern town of Kizzuwatna near the Mitannian border, with Kail in pursuit, but soon after their arrival, the town is attacked by Mitanni forces. Yuri manages to purge the Rose Water from Zannanza, and after overpowering some of the enemy soldiers, they learn that this attack is the prelude to a full-fledged invasion against the Hittite Empire, led by none other than Mattiwaza, the ruthless crown prince of Mitanni.
7	"Cold Lips"; Transliteration: "Tsumetai Kuchibiru" (Japanese: 冷たい唇)	Yūzō Satō	Gō Zappa	Yūzō Satō	August 19, 2026
Zannanza sends Yuri go to inform Kail while he organizes Kizzuwatna's defenses. Although Kail and Zannanza begin engaging the Mitanni forces, the Kizzuwatna forces soon side with the Mitanni after their king is forced to ally with Mattiwaza; but after Yuri actively aids the citizens against the Mitanni, they rally to her and help driving the Mitanni out. Following the battle, Nakia demands to have Kail and Zannanza's status stripped for Yuri's abduction. Yuri prevents this by claiming that Kail staged the kidnapping as a ruse to prepare for the attack. However, Kail, struggling with his growing feelings for Yuri and her eventual return to her own time, begins distancing himself from her, which upsets Yuri, who has herself long since fallen for Kail.
8	"Under the Apple Tree"; Transliteration: "Ringo no Konoshita de" (Japanese: 林檎の木の下で)	Hideaki Uehara	Yasuko Kamo	Hideaki Uehara	August 26, 2026
Grain shipments to Hattusa are mysteriously disappearing, and the Mitanni are suspected. Yuri overhears Nakia and Urhi's discussion about the Eye of Illuyanka, a talisman that enables its wielder to mind-control people, which was set to arrive with the missing shipment. Yuri informs Kail about the talisman, but he won't let her join so that she will have the chance to return to her own time within ten months. Zannanza decides to help get Yuri and Kail together by leading them to an apple tree. Left alone to spend time together, not only that Kail finally agrees to let Yuri accompany him, but they also confess their feelings for each other. The next day, Kail, Yuri, and their allies depart for the city of Malatya, which Mittizawa is using as a trap for the Hittite army; en route, Yuri meets commanders Kash, Mittanamwa, and Rusafa, as well as Shalma, a priest. Upon reaching their goal, Kail infiltrates the city by posing as a hedonistic prince to lull the Mitanni's alertness.
9	"The Sign on the Palm"; Transliteration: "Te no Hira no Shirushi" (Japanese: 手のひらのしるし)	Mitsuhiro Yoneda	Gō Zappa	Mitsuhiro Yoneda	September 2, 2026
Kail's plan succeeds, and his group puts their plan to retake Malatya in motion. Yuri leads a group to find the Eye of Illuyanka and discovers a map leading to its whereabouts. Elsewhere, Shalma, who is actually Urhi sent by Nakia to retrieve the Eye of Illuyanka, sabotages the ambush meant to intercept a messenger, allowing the messenger to inform Mittizawa of Kail's presence in Malatya. Seeing that he has been played, Mittizawa heads back to the city. Zannanza and Yuri learn of Mittizawa's return, and warn Kail. Yuri finds the Eye in a small treasury; Urhi knocks her out, but Mittizawa takes the talisman before Urhi can escape with it. Hadi, Ryui, and Shala witness Yuri's capture by the Mitanni soldiers.
10	"Ishtar Purloined"; Transliteration: "Ubawareta Ishutaru" (Japanese: 奪われたイシュタル)	Hisaya Takabayashi	Yasuko Kamo	Yasuhiro Minami	September 9, 2026
After Hadi sends Ryui and Shala to help Yuri, she informs Kail about her capture. In time, Mittizawa learns of rumors regarding Kail's concubine Ishtar being among his prisoners and eventually identifies Yuri. To dispel Yuri's myth of being Ishtar, Mittizawa throws her to a lion, promising to grant her a wish if she survives. With Aslan's help, Yuri subdues the beast, but instead of asking for her freedom, Yuri demands that Mittizawa treat his captives better, suspecting that he would double-cross her. Mittizawa accepts, but also plans to use her for his own means by making Yuri his concubine, threatening to harm Ryui and Shala if she refuses; Yuri is forced to agree. Kash, who is sent by Kail as a messenger, later gives Yuri a hidden clay-carved heart image that professes Kail's love for her. Later, Urhi enlists Nadia, Nakia's younger sister and Mittizawa's head concubine, to kill Yuri.
11	"Where My Heart Is"; Transliteration: "Kokoro no Ari ka" (Japanese: 心のありか)	Hiroshi Itō	Yoriko Tomita	Kō Matsuzono	September 16, 2026
As Yuri is brought to Mittizawa's harem house, Nadia sets Yuri up by luring her into the Blue Deer Room,which is forbidden for anyone to enter, under false pretenses; she later informs Mittizawa, believing he will kill Yuri out of hand. Just as he prepares to strike, Mittizawa is halted by the memory of his once-beloved sister Tatukia, who once lived in that room before she was sold to the Egyptians as the pharaoh's consort. Mittizawa learns of Nadia's treachery, but Yuri stops him from killing her. After Mittizawa simply gives her a warning, Yuri later looks after the captured Hittite soldiers to plan her escape, but is appalled to see the sick and injured left to die in a ruined house. Determined, she improves the conditions for the suffering, earning her the admiration of the Mittani. Kail and his forces fight their way through Mittani's defenses with iron-reinforced chariots; Yuri rallies the prisoners to strike Wassugani from within. Mittizawa evacuates himself and his father, taking Yuri as hostage to secure their escape.
12	"The Appointed Time"; Transliteration: "Yakusoku no Toki" (Japanese: 約束のとき)	Yasuhiro Minami	Yoriko Tomita	Yasushi Murotani	September 23, 2026
Kail and his forces pursue Mittizawa and Yuri to Carchemish and besiege the city. Suppililiuma also joins the battle, and Nadia helps Kail sneak into the city. Mittizawa attempts to use the Eye of Illuyanka on Yuri against her will, but some of the Mittani soldiers revolt against him for his abuse and kill his father. Nadia protects Mittizawa and expresses her feelings for him, and Yuri urges him to accept Nadia as his equal. Before fleeing with Nadia to Babylonia, Mittizawa gives Yuri a jewel that formerly belonged to Tatukia. After Yuri reunites with Kail and the others, they prepare to send Yuri back to her time, but Urhi burns down the bridge to Hattusa, preventing Yuri from returning home. Yuri accepts her role as Ishtar. While Kail is still conflicted about his relationship with Yuri, Ilbani advises him to do everything he can to make her stay. Meanwhile, in Egypt, Tutankhamen has died. Tatukia, now Nefertiti, explains to her daughter Ankhesenamen, Tutankhamen's wife, that she may have to remarry.
13	"A Letter From Egypt"; Transliteration: "Ejiputo Kara no Shokan" (Japanese: エジプトからの書簡)	Mitsuo Hashimoto	Yoriko Tomita	Hiroaki Shimura	September 30, 2026
While Nakia is furious over the loss of the Eye of Illuyanka, Suppililiuma announces that the Queen of Egypt plans to wed Ankhesenamen to a Hittite prince. Urhi suggests a chariot race, with the victor to marry Ankhesenamen. Juda, Nakia's son and Kail's younger half-brother, secretly enlists Yuri's help to keep Kail in Hittite by making him lose the race; however, Zannanza, who feels the same about his brother, wins instead. With her plan jeopardized, Nakia orders Urhi to have Zannanza killed to ensure that Egypt will wage war on Hittite. Yuri joins Zannanza on the journey to Egypt, but some of Nakia's men have infiltrated the caravan. Zannanza is killed protecting Yuri, who is wounded along with Aslan. One assassin kills his accomplices before leaving, wanting the reward all for himself, unaware that Yuri and Aslan survived.
14	"The Arrow Wound of Grief"; Transliteration: "Tomurai no Ya Kizu" (Japanese: 弔いの矢傷)	Hideaki Uehara	Gō Zappa	Hideaki Uehara	October 7, 2026
While attempting to return to Hittite in order to reveal the truth behind Zannanza's assassination, Yuri encounters Ramses, a commander of Zannanza's intended Egyptian escort. Though Ramses initially ignores her, Yuri persuades him to bring her back to the Hittite empire. As he escorts Yuri, Ramses is surprised to learn her identity as Ishtar. Yuri arrives in time to prevent the impending conflict, revealing that the arrow in her back can prove who is responsible for Zannanza's death. The assassin attempts to escape, but Urhi kills him for his failures before he can be questioned. Amazed by Yuri's bravery and integrity, Ramses, who longs to bring his corrupted nation back to its former glory, vows to make her his future queen.
15	"The False Ishtar"; Transliteration: "Nise Ishutaru" (Japanese: 偽イシュタル)	Unknown	Unknown	TBA	October 14, 2026
A deadly epidemic ravages the Hittite empire, claiming the life of King Suppililiuma. Kail's eldest brother, Sari Arnuwanda, is chosen as the next ruler. Nakia continues her schemes, while Yuri has to fend off Ramses, who had himself installed as an envoy in Hattusha so he can flirt with her. Yuri soon learns that someone is impersonating her and goes to the city of Katapa investigate, but after confronting the imposter, she is detained in a valley where the infected are left to die. Yuri remains to help the sick, and despite Urhi's hopes, she remains healthy thanks to modern vaccination, earning her a saint's reputation with the citizens. Struggling to keep up her charade, the false Ishtar has Yuri imprisoned, but the citizens revolt and free her. Kail arrives, exposes the imposter, while Urhi flees, and reunites with Yuri. He then reveals that Yuri is the real Ishtar to the citizens.
16	"The Oath at the Grave"; Transliteration: "Bozen de no Chikai" (Japanese: 墓前での誓い)	Unknown	Unknown	TBA	October 21, 2026
Passing judgement over the citizens of Katapa, Yuri employs her imposter Ursula, a villager born in poverty, as her handmaiden. Soon after, Kail is chosen as Arnuwanda's designated successor, much to Nakia's dismay. During the winter, Yuri meets a young boy and his mother Guzel, the daughter of Aygil, the royal senate's chairman, and one of Kail's former lovers. Aygil informs Kail that Kail is the father of Guzel's son, who is named after Kail himself, a claim which leaves Yuri upset. After refusing to see Guzel's son, Kail tries to assure Yuri about his actual relationship with Guzel, but Yuri refuses to believe him. Kail then brings Yuri to his mother's tomb where he solemnly swears that Guzel's son is not his child, and they both suspect Nakia's hand in this development.
17	"A New Conspiracy"; Transliteration: "Aratana Takurami" (Japanese: 新たなたくらみ)	TBA	TBA	TBA	October 28, 2026
Ursula informs Yuri about Nakia's next scheme after she stole some of Nakia's poisoned white powder as evidence, unaware that Nakia wanted her to do that. Yuri suspects Nakia is planning to poison King Arnuwanda; she gains Juda's help and they manage to prevent the poisoning, but Urhi murders Arnuwanda before he retreats. Yuri ends up being blamed, though her allies aren't convinced that she is the killer, and Kail suspects that Nakia had planned to have Yuri accused of murder from the start. As the kingdom is in lockdown, Juda becomes suspicious towards Nakia's involvement with Arnuwanda's death, but Nakia plans to manipulate Juda as the witness to Yuri's "murder".
18	"Proof of Innocence"; Transliteration: "Muzai no Shōmei" (Japanese: 無罪の証明)	TBA	TBA	TBA	November 4, 2026
Juda, manipulated by Nakia's Black Water, accuses Yuri of being Arnuwanda's murderer, but Kail declares that Yuri will be taken into his custody, thus defying the law and angering Nakia. With Hadi and her sisters' help, Kail ensures Yuri's escape to Alinna, but Nakia sends her private army after Yuri. To prove Yuri's innocence, Kail brings Guzel and her son to the throne room and removes the Black Water from Guzel's body, revealing the truth behind her son's origins and exposing Nakia's scheme. Still determined to keep her vow to make Juda the next king and ensure Yuri's death, Nakia refuses to let the manipulated Juda get inspected and warns them that a war will break out if they dare to go against her. In the past, Nakia was once a princess of Babylonia who was forced into marriage with the Hittite Empire to forge an alliance against Mitanni, and now is using Juda for revenge. Kail is warned to not help Yuri, but Yuri decides to return to Hittite to prevent the war from happening.
19	"Dream of that Wonderful Day"; Transliteration: "Itsuka Kuru Hi no Yumi o Mite" (Japanese: いつか来る日の夢を見て)	TBA	TBA	TBA	November 11, 2026
Urhi leads a raid on Alinna to capture Yuri, but she leaves despite the concerns of her allies, and Rusafa, who came to Alinna as a messenger, shoots out Urhi's left eye to create an opening. After Yuri falls into the Red River, Ramses rescues her, but then intends to take her to Egypt, explaining his intentions of becoming the next pharaoh to reform his corrupted homeland, with Yuri as his queen. After Rusafa and the sisters return to Hittite to inform their allies of Ramses' kidnapping on Yuri, Kail forces his way out to rescue Yuri while Illbani tells the others to ensure that no one finds out of Kail's sudden departure. Despite Kash's protests, Ursula selflessly decides to sacrifice herself to save Yuri by claiming to the minsters that she is Arnuwanda's true killer, implicating Nakia, who leaves after failing to frame Kail. Kash tries to rescue Ursula, but she refuses, allowing herself to be executed so that Kash, along with their close allies, can stop Nakia. Upon learning of Ursula's false confession, Yuri tries to persuade Ramses to take her back to Hittite, but Ramses selfishly refuses.
20	"Divisions"; Transliteration: "Kiretsu" (Japanese: 亀裂)	TBA	TBA	TBA	November 18, 2026
Searching for Yuri, Kail uses Aslan to lead him to Yuri's location. Just as Ramses tries to force himself on Yuri. Kail, Rusafa and Mittannamuwa arrive to rescue her, and Ramses decides to retreat and tells Yuri he will find and recapture her. Kash informs Kail and Yuri of Ursula's execution and the ongoing fight in Alinna, explaining that Ursula only sacrificed her life to ensure that Yuri and Kail will have a future. Yuri, Kail and their allies return to Alinna to stop Nakia's army, but Nakia pins the blame for the attack on Urhi. Kail orders a manhunt for Urhi and corners him, but Urhi chooses to throw himself into the Red River rather than betray Nakia, thereby keeping Nakia's ploy from coming to light; this leads Yuri into wondering why Urhi is so loyal to Nakia and what would make him go that far to protect her.
21	"The Decision to Leave"; Transliteration: "Wakare no Tetsui" (Japanese: 別れの決意)	TBA	TBA	TBA	November 25, 2026

== Reception ==
Red River won the Shogakukan Manga Award for the shōjo category in 2001.

As of May 2006, the manga had over 16 million copies in circulation. As of March 2019, the manga had over 20 million copies in circulation.
