= Petit Comic =

Japanese manga magazine

- Cover of issue #9 of 2008, featuring Kimi wa Kirakira by Aki Yoshino
- Categories: Josei manga
- Frequency: Monthly
- Circulation: 16,500; (July–September 2026)
- Founded: 1977
- Company: Shogakukan
- Country: Japan
- Based in: Tokyo
- Language: Japanese
- Website: Petit Comic

Petit Comic (Japanese: プチコミック, Hepburn: Puchi Komikku; also known as PuchiComi) is a Japanese josei manga magazine published by Shogakukan. Many series in this anthology magazine are romance-oriented and some are well known for featuring frank depiction of sexual situations. It is also the first josei manga magazine, making its debut in 1977 and being a pioneer in the genre.

== Notable manga artists and series featured ==
- Kazumi Kazui
  - Dōse Mō Nigerarenai
- Maki Enjōji
  - Hapi Mari
  - An Incurable Case of Love
  - Tsumari Sukitte Iitain dakedo
- Chie Shinohara
  - Kioku no Ashiato
  - Yume no Shizuku, Kin no Torikago
- Yuki Yoshihara
  - Butterflies, Flowers
- Akemi Yoshimura
  - Bara no Tame ni
- Ohmi Tomu
  - Midnight Secretary
- Shiho Watanabe
  - 18-sai, Niizuma, Furin shimasu
- Miyuki Kitagawa
  - Dō shiyō mo nai Boku to Kiss shiyō
