= Chie Shinohara =

Japanese manga artist

Chie Shinohara 篠原千絵
- Born: February 15 Kanagawa Prefecture, Japan
- Area: Manga artist
- Notable works: Red River, Purple Eyes in the Dark
- Awards: Shogakukan Manga Award for shōjo manga in 1987 and 2001

Chie Shinohara (篠原千絵, Shinohara Chie; born February 15) is a Japanese manga artist best known for Red River, known in Japan as Sora wa Akai Kawa no Hotori: Anatolia Story. She has twice received the Shogakukan Manga Award for shōjo, in 1987 for Yami no Purple Eye and in 2001 for Red River.

Aside from her comics work, she has also written several prose novels. She has published the six volume Big Draw Daughter Hatsu light novel series, as well as three gaiden (or side-story) novels related to her Red River series. All of these were illustrated by Shinohara herself.

== Works ==
- 1984/1987 - Yami no Purple Eyes (Purple Eyes of Darkness)
- 1984 - Houmonsha wa Mayonaka ni (Midnight Visitor)
- 1985 - Mokugekisha ni Sayounara (Farewell to the Eyewitness)
- 1986 - Nanika ga yami de mite iru (Something Watching in the Dark)
- 1987/1991 - Umi no Yami, Tsuki no Kage (Moon Shadow on a Dark Sea)
- 1988/1991 - Ryouko no Shinreijikenbo (A Record of Ryoko's Psychic Events)
- 1992 - Sanninme ga Kieta (A Third Person Disappeared)
- 1992/1994 - Ao no Fūin (Blue Seal)
- 1994 - Soshite Gokai no Suzu ga naru (Then Five Bells Rang)
- 1995 - Kootta Natsu no Hi (Frozen Summer Day)
- 1995/2002 - Sora wa Akai Kawa no Hotori: Anatolia Story (Red River)
- 1996 - Toubou Kyuukou (Runaway Express)
- 1997/2005/2006 - Umi ni Ochiru Tsubame
- 2003 - Akatsuki ni Tatsu Lion
- 2004/2005 - Mizu ni Sumu Hana (Romance of Darkness)
- 2005 - Kioku no Ashiato (Footprint of the Memories)
- 2007 - Kiri no Mori Hotel
- 2008/2009 - Tokidamari no Hime
- 2010/2024 - Yume no Shizuku, Kin no Torikago
