= List of Kare First Love chapters =

First English edition of Kare First Love as published by Viz Media

The chapters of the manga series Kare First Love were written and illustrated by Kaho Miyasaka. The first chapter premiered in the March 2002 issue of the bi-monthly magazine Shōjo Comic, where it was serialized until its conclusion in the August 2004 issue. The series focuses on the first romance between high school students Karin Karino and Aoi Kiriya as they struggle to deal with their respective families, their own insecurities about their relationship, pressures regarding sex, and decisions about their futures.

The 57 untitled chapters were collected in ten tankōbon volumes published by Shogakukan between July 26, 2002, and on December 20, 2004. It was adapted into a drama CD by Pioneer Entertainment that includes scenes from the first two volumes of the series. The manga series is licensed for English-language release in North America by Viz Media, which released the first volume on September 7, 2004. The final volume was released on December 12, 2006. It is licensed for regional language releases in France and Spain by Panini Comics, in Germany by Egmont Manga & Anime, in Denmark by Mangismo Danmark, in Sweden by Mangismo Sverige, and in Taiwan by Ever Glory Publishing.

== Volume list ==
No.	Original release date	Original ISBN	English release date	English ISBN
1	July 26, 2002	978-4-09-137064-8	September 7, 2004	978-1-59116-394-7
Chapters 1–4
While on the bus to her all-girl high school, plain-looking Karin Karino catches the attention of a boy named Aoi Kiriya who takes her picture. Though his friend Tohru laughs and calls her "four eyes", Kiriya approaches her to ask her about her photography book. At Karin's stop, Kiriya catches her when the bus jolts, preventing her from falling. As he reaches up to return her dropped book, he accidentally lifts up her skirt while his camera is still in his hand. Embarrassed, Karin slaps him and runs off to school. Word has already reached her class, and her friend Yuka makes cruel jokes at Karin's expense about it. Karin thinks to herself that Yuka is not a real friend, but notes that she endures it to avoid being disliked. After school, Kiriya is waiting at the gate to return Karin's book and Yuka decides she wants Kiriya. The girls hang out Kiriya and his friends at a bar, where Karin gets drunk trying to ignore the mean-spirited teasing of Yuka and Tohru. She escapes into the bathroom where Kiriya finds her just as she gets sick. In the morning, she awakens to find herself in Kiriya's bed, with him sitting beside her on the floor. He shocks her by kissing her, then telling her she is cute even without her glasses. Over the next few days, Karin begins a friendship with classmate Nanri after she catches Karin venting to herself about Yuka and Kiriya. During another encounter with Kiriya, Karin's glasses get cracked so she switches to contact lenses. After several more meetings, Karin begs Kiriya to teasing her by calling her cute and kissing her, but he embraces her and promises that he means it. Yuka begins bullying Karin out of jealousy. Kiriya eventually asks Karin to be his girlfriend.
2	October 26, 2002	978-4-09-137065-5	December 28, 2004	978-1-59116-395-4
Chapters 5–11
Karin lies to Kiriya and pretends she is not interested in her while the bullying continues. Nanri convinces Karin to go with her to a club to pick up guys. After running into Tohru, Karin tries to leave, but Kiriya sees her and picks her up, demanding she tell him the truth about her avoiding him. Karin hugs him before escaping and running away crying. The next day at school, Nanri tells Yuka off for pretending Karin "stole" Kiriya when Kiriya was the one who chose who he liked. Pretending to take it to heart, Yuka tricks Karin and locks her on the roof as it starts raining. Thanks to a call from Nanri, Kiriya arrives, smashes the door window, and chases Yuka off. They embrace and Karin admits she is in love with him too. When Kiriya walks her home, Karin invites him inside. He asks her about the piano in the house and she explains that her grandmother taught her how to play. Though she loves to play, she stopped out of fear of annoying her parents. She plays a song for him and he thinks she looks beautiful while doing so. Her mom comes home unexpectedly and they hide in Karin's room, kissing against the back of the bedroom door. He leaves out the window, but Karin's mom sees him and puts Karin on a curfew. The next night she goes on a date with Kiriya, breaking the curfew, and they agree to go on summer trip together. Upset by the changes in Karin's behavior later, her mom enrolls her in cram school. Desperate to keep her grades so that her mom will have no more reasons to complain about her seeing Kiriya, Karin ends up exhausting herself and missing meals. Kiriya finds her collapsed on her floor one afternoon. Afterwards, their friends agree to study together so they can help each other, and Karin's mom agrees that she can go on the trip as long as she does not neglect her studies.
3	January 25, 2003	978-4-09-137066-2	March 15, 2005	978-1-59116-701-3
Chapters 12–17
Kiriya begins pressuring Karin about having sex. To pay for their trip to Western Okinawa Beach, Karin gets a part-time job at a local restaurant. Kiriya demands that Karin wear her glasses and wear her hair in a plain style so the male customers will not hit on her, and later gets jealous when she tells him one customer said she was cute. One night, Kiriya's father suddenly appears, slaps him, then forces him to leave with him leaving a worried Karin wondering what is going on. Tohru and Hiromu explain that Kiriya's father is a famous business man who wants Kiriya to follow in his footsteps. Since Kiriya's brother died, Kiriya's father has been determined that he will take over the business instead. Karin walks by Kiriya's apartment to look for him and finds Shoko, his sister-in-law there. Shoko throws away Kiriya's camera, cracking the lens. Karin uses the money she had earned for the trip to buy him a new lens. After Kiriya returns, he thanks her for protecting the camera and they leave for their trip. Shoko arrives as well, making Karin worry that the older woman is in love with Kiriya. During the trip, Kiriya reveals that his brother was Yuji, the photographer Karin admires. He takes her to the beach where Yuji died, saving Kiriya from drowning, and thanks her for helping him pick up a camera again. At Yuji's home, they find a photography book Yuji left for Shoko, which helps her come to terms with his death. That night, Karin ends up having to stay in Kiriya's room, but she panics every time he tries to touch her. In frustration, he goes to take a shower, and Karin gets drunk on hard cider she finds in the fridge. When he comes out, she admits she is scared and he promises to give her more time. After the start of the fall semester, Karin is asked to accompany the school's vocal group on the piano, which makes her happy. However, Kiriya again grows frustrated about their not having sex and ends up yelling at her when she comes to his school festival, leaving her crying with Nanri.
4	April 24, 2003	978-4-09-137067-9	June 7, 2005	978-1-59116-802-7
Chapter 18–23
Kiriya distances himself from Karin. To try to make up, Karin goes to Kiriya's house one night and offers him sex, but he shoves her away and orders her to go home. Wanting to show him that she only cares about him, she goes to the festival wearing her glasses and braids. Kiriya finds her playing the piano. He apologizes, explaining that while he loved how she blossomed, it made him feel insecure and he thought having sex would make her his. He gives her a key to his apartment and she soon uses it to make him dinner. When Kiriya comes home from working, though, he is sick with a cold and collapses. Karin spends the night at his house to take care of him, infuriating her father who returned from his business trip. In the morning, she has an argument with her parents over Kiriya, eventually stomping out of the house and going to Nanri's since they have no school that day. Nanri reveals to Karin that her period is very late. Karin offers her support and they travel to a distant store to buy a pregnancy test. Karin offers to go in when Nanri seems afraid. Inside, she runs into Kiriya, and then they are both picked up by a truancy officer who calls their parents. Karin's father is furious. Nanri tries to explain and Kiriya boldly tells him that if the test were for Karin, he would never leave her. Karin's father forbids her from seeing Kiriya and confiscates her cell phone. At school, Yuka spreads a rumor that Karin was arrested at a love motel and got an abortion. Nanri punches her, telling her she long had it coming. Later, Nanri lets Karin know that she went to the hospital and is not pregnant but that her boyfriend broke up with her over it. Kiriya and Karin see each other on the bus, and talk about living together after saving enough money. For Christmas, Karin buys him a key ring. On Christmas Eve, Karin jumps from her father's car to try to meet Kiriya, but returns home after she accidentally drops the present and someone steps on it. That night at home, Kiriya brings by her present and she sneaks him into her room where they begin kissing.
5	July 26, 2003	978-4-09-137068-6	September 13, 2005	978-1-59116-986-4
Chapters 24–29
Karin and Kiriya make love, stopping before penetration because the pain scares her and she starts crying. Karin is upset that she was not able to "have sex right", but Kiriya comforts her and they sleep together in Karin's bed. While on another date, Kiriya wants to go try again, but Karin isn't ready. They end up fighting, accusing each other of trying to test their feelings for each other. They both stubbornly refuse to apologize. On New Year's, Karin's father wants to do a family portrait. As his camera does not work, they go to a photography store. Coincidentally, it is the same store Kiriya works at. From the owner, Karin's father learns more Kiriya while Karin and her sister change into kimono. They both see a photograph of Karin playing the piano that recently won Kiriya a prize. Karin is touched at how she looks to him and her father asks that Kiriya take the portrait. Afterward, he talks with Kiriya alone and bluntly asks if Kiriya is having sex with his daughter. Kiriya answers honestly, and tells him that Karin brought him to life again. Her father agrees to allow them to date, with no curfew on weekends. Karin's family goes home and the couple walks around to talk. Deciding she can not just forgive him too easily, again, Karin deliberately plays "The Song of Farewell" on a piano in a store. Kiriya loudly apologizes for being insensitive and pressuring her again and begs her not to leave. Karin forgives him and has him help her pierce her ears so she can wear the diamond earrings he gave her for Christmas. That weekend, at Shoko's invitation they go to the mountains to watch a photo shoot, but a storm forces them take shelter in a love motel. While Kiriya is in the shower, Karin realizes she has lost one of her earrings and frantically runs outside to search for it, straight into the path of an oncoming car. It stops in time, but Karin hurts her leg. In the car are Shoko and the photography, Shinji Takagi, who annoys Kiriya by picking up the injured Karin. They take Karin and Kiriya to their hotel and Shoko calls Karin's parents. Later, Kiriya overhears Shinji harshly critiquing his prize winning photo. Back in their room, he picks a fight with, but Karin realizes he is jealous and teases him. They begin kissing, but then he stops saying he does not want to have their first time be when he is in such a mood.
6	October 25, 2003	978-4-09-137069-3	December 13, 2005	978-1-4215-0139-0
Chapters 30–35
Karin is hurt to learn that Kiriya went to Shoko about Shinji's harsh critique rather than talking about it with her. On the train, she hugs him but he pushes her away and tells her not to try so hard, hurting her more. After Kiriya drops Karin at home, her mom comes out and asks him not to avoid anymore overnight visits as they worry about Karin. With Valentine's Day approaching, Karin wants to let Kiriya know she is ready, but is afraid he will reject her again. At Nanri's suggestion, she talks about it with Tohru and Hiromi. Tohru suggests she give him condoms with his Valentine's chocolates. Karin later calls Shinji to arrange to retrieve her missing earring, going to his studio before her date with Kiriya on Valentine's Day. However, Shinji refuses to give Karin the earring until she lets him take a photo of her, which she reluctantly allows. Afterwards he drops her off at Kiriya's apartment, which Kiriya sees. He grabs Karin as soon as she comes into the apartment, kissing her aggressively, but she pushes him away to give him the chocolates. Before he can open them, she realizes he has already received chocolates from other girls and ate their first. They fight and she takes her chocolates back, leaving them for her father. Her father confronts her about the condoms that were in them, but they are interrupted when they see Karin on the television playing piano in a commercial. Shoko goes to her school the next day to explain that it was shot without Karin's knowledge, keeping Karin from getting in trouble. Jealous, Yuka begins spreading fake nude photographs of Karin around the school. Upset, Karin goes to see Kiriya to make up. bringing him new chocolates, but he tells her he is "tired of this." Deeply hurt and still upset about the nude pictures, Karin skips school the next day, riding the bus to the end of the line then wandering around aimlessly. At the same time, Kiriya nearly cheats on Karin, taking another girl home and kissing her. Nanri text messages him about Karin being missing at the same time the girl opens the new chocolates Karin left for him, uncovering the condom and a note. Kiriya rushes off in search of Karin, finding her crying while playing the piano in a square where they had their first date. He embraces her and apologizes. They agree that they need to talk about their problems like adults rather than pushing it aside because they are not made anymore, and then repeat their first date.
7	February 26, 2004	978-4-09-137070-9	March 14, 2006	978-1-4215-0325-7
Chapters 36–41
Kiriya does not want Karin to go home yet, so they sneak into a theme park. Karin notices something on his face and he jumps back, realizing it is the other girl's lipstick. He pretends she frightened him and they embrace. Missing the last train, they catch a cab, but Karin begins crying, not ready to part either, so they go to Kiriya's apartment where they finally make love for the first time. In the morning, Karin's sister and Nanri text message her to let her know that they covered for her. Kiriya meets with Nanri and Tohru for lunch, where Nanri learns he cheated on Karin. She slaps him, and then tells him to keep it to himself and suffer in silence rather than hurt Karin more. Meanwhile, Karin finds Shoko waiting at her, with an offer to act in another music video. During their next date, Kiriya points out an expensive camera he wants, then asks Karin to model for him for an upcoming photography contest. She decides to take the job so that she can buy the camera for him. Kiriya insists on accompanying her, where he runs into a girl named Saori. They share some tense words, but when Karin asks him about it, he says she was just giving him directions. Karin is unhappy to learn that the commercial will require her to hug another boy, and Saori taunts her about not calling Kiriya by his first name. Worried Kiriya might already be bored with her, she goes to his apartment and makes dinner. A woman calls but hangs up when Karin answers. Later when Kiriya is home, she calls again and he leaves to help Saori whose moped is broken down. Kiriya is not happy about her calling, and tells her it is the last time they will talk. When he returns home, Karin has left and thrown the dinner away. He goes to her place to apologize. She forgives him and they make out in her bedroom. At work the next day, Saori tells Karin that she was Kiriya's first girl friend, upsetting her to the point that she is unable to concentrate and ruins the work day. At dinner, she picks a fight with Kiriya over his keeping the secret, and expresses regret at having had sex, but when he leaves she apologizes for taking out her bad day on him. The next day, he sends her a photo album of pictures he took of her, which cheers her up.
8	June 25, 2004	978-4-09-137868-2	June 13, 2006	978-1-4215-0546-6
Chapters 42–47
Shinji changing the script for the commercial, without telling Karin so that at the end of the scene, she finds herself being kissed by the teenage boy she's working with. Karin is annoyed, but completes the commercial successfully. Kiriya's mother has collapsed and he is forced to go back to his parents home. Without discussing it with him, Kiriya's father moves him out of his apartment. Kiriya furiously confronts his father when his belongings arrive, but his father blames him for his mother's collapse and decrees that Kiriya will move back home, give up photography, and begin to take over the family business. Worried about Kiriya, Karin convinces Saori to help her find his parents home. Before parting, Saori apologizes for being jealous and asks Karin to support him where she could not. Outside the house, Karin meets Kiriya's father who tells her to leave him alone. Determined, she climbs over fence and meets the housekeeper Ms. Masuda, who helps the lovers see each other and tells Karin that she is glad Kiriya was not alone. Kiriya tells Karin he is going to give up photography, but Karin wants him to be true to himself and suggests they move in together so that he can be free to live his own dreams. Kiriya brushes her off, thinking she does not mean it. To help him, Karin, along with Nanri and Hiromi begin working at the restaurant Karin worked at before, hoping to save enough money to let the couple get their own place. Kiriya is touched and apologizes for trying to keep his problems to himself. He takes Karin as his date to a business party his father is holding. Outside, Karin tries to talk to his father, to get him to look at Kiriya's photos, but he tears them up. Kiriya finds Karin standing outside in a pond gathering the pieces and crying. He comforts her then makes a deal with his father: if he wins the photography contest, he gets to pursue photography but if he does not come in first place, he will give it up. That night the couple makes love and talk about their fears that the other was going to drift away from them. The next day, Kiriya's father collapses outside the house, directly in front of an on-coming car.
9	September 24, 2004	978-4-09-137869-9	September 12, 2006	978-1-4215-0547-3
Chapters 48–53
Kiriya saves his father and is hit instead, fracturing his arm and leg. Karin and the others are surprised at his father's seeming lack of concern as he returns to work, but later they discover that his father was carrying the last family portrait taken Yuji's death with him. That night, his father goes by the hospital and quietly strokes Kiriya's hair while he tosses restlessly in bed. Karin arrives after work to find Kiriya crying wordlessly in the hospital's sitting area. After he returns home, Kiriya leaves the house without telling anyone. Karin suspects the photo is a clue and searches for another copy so they can figure out the location. While in his father's study, she learns that he has a room full of Yuji's photographs that he clearly treasures, and that he is seriously ill. His father finds her there and requests she keep what she has learned to herself until after the contest. Karin finds Kiriya at the location of the photo and is sad than Kiriya thinks his father does not love him, but keeps her promise not to say anything. A few days later, Karin realizes they forgot Kiriya's birthday. When they talk about it, Kiriya asks that his present be for Karin to play him "Gymnopédie", a song that his mother used to play for him as a child. While Karin is playing the song on his family's piano, Kiriya's mother staggers into the room Kiriya is finally able to speak to his mother for the first time since her collapse. Karin studies and practices the song for him so she can play it without the music. When she goes to return the sheet music, she finds his mother trying to play, but unable to control her right hand. Karin offers to play with her. They both enjoy the experience, agreeing to do it again sometime. Kiriya finally enters the contest, but still questions if he should give up photography. When the contest results are announced, Kiriya comes in third place, but keeps it to himself. Later he gets into another argument with his father, and the man collapses. At the hospital, the doctor tells Kiriya that his father has hypertension and needs to stop working so hard. Blaming himself, Kiriya starts to break his camera, but Karin stops him and begs him to talk honestly with his father. Kiriya gets down on his knees and apologizes, then asks him to understand that he cannot give up photography. At the contest exhibition, his father sees Kiriya's photograph of Karin surrounded by fireflies and tells him it is beautiful.
10	December 20, 2004	978-4-09-137870-5	December 12, 2006	978-1-4215-0548-0
Chapters 54–57; "Special Episode - Kiriya at 13 (Spring)"
Kiriya is interviewed by a photography magazine as he is the youngest person to ever win a prize in the contest. Karin's sister asks her to play at a friend's wedding, but her mother quickly squashes the idea, saying Karin should use the time studying and would only embarrass herself. At school, the students begin doing career planning. While talking with her friends, Karin realizes that everyone, even Tohru, has plans for their future. While she is going to college, she does not know what she is going to study or what career she wants. Kiriya realizes Karin is upset and takes her on a date to cheer her up. They make plans to go to Hokkaido to visit Mr. Hodaka, Yuji's former photography teacher, and are surprised that both of their families agree to allow it. Karin learns that Kiriya was invited to study in New York, but turned it down. At the Hodaka's, Karin is annoyed when Kiriya goes out all night taking photographs, and picks a fight with him when she finally returns. Kiriya comforts her, telling her she can take her time figuring out what she wants and that he will always take care of her. Karin later talks about her insecurities with Mr. Hodaka and his wife Fumika, who advise her to acknowledge her fears and jealous, and then take her time to find what suits her best. Their friends, and Shinji, arrive, saying they were bored. They help the pair plan a wedding ceremony for the Hodaka's, who had eloped when they were younger. Mr. Hodaka initially declines, but on the anniversary of Yuji's death, Kiriya convinces him to stop blaming himself and then introduces Karin to his late brother. During the ceremony, Mr. Hodaka asks Karin to play a special song for the wedding, and Fumika is touched by how beautifully she plays it. She goes into labor and gives birth to a little girl. After things calm down, Kiriya takes Karin back to the church where he has covered a room with dozens of star photographs he had taken during the nights he left her alone. He has her search for a special "star", a heart-shaped Tiffany diamond ring, and asks her to marry him. She accepts to their friends' delight. Back home, Karin confronts her parents and tells them she wants to continue to play the piano and go to music school. Her mother is not happy, but her father agrees with her request, explaining that she has never seriously challenged them about anything else except dating Kiriya. Kiriya's father returns all of the money Kiriya had paid in rent for his apartment, having actually been paying it himself all two years, and tells him not to worry about the business anymore. After they graduate, Karin and Kiriya marry.
