= List of Uwasa no Midori-kun!! chapters =

The manga series Uwasa no Midori-kun!! was written and illustrated by Gō Ikeyamada. It was serialised in Shogakukan's Shōjo Comic in December 2006 where it ran until its conclusion in October 2008. The individual chapters were collected and published in ten tankōbon volumes by Shogakukan. Two of its chapters are used in Gō Ikeyamada's Shōnen x Cinderella.

== Volume list ==
No.	Release date	ISBN
1	December 12, 2006	4-09-130740-X
Game 1-5
2	March 26, 2007	978-4-09-131005-7
Game 6-10; Extra Game of Sagara Kouki
3	May 5, 2007	978-4-09-131045-3
Game 11-15
4	August 24, 2007	978-4-09-131137-5
Game 16-20
5	October 26, 2007	978-4-09-131349-2
Game 21-25
6	December 21, 2007	978-4-09-131364-5
Game 26-30
7	March 26, 2008	978-4-09-131556-4
Game 31-34; Extra story: Uwasa no Wedding
8	May 26, 2008	978-4-09-131600-4
Game 35-3...; Other story: Shōnen X Cinderella chapter 1
9	August 26, 2008	978-4-09-131845-9
Game 3...-4...; Other story: Shōnen X Cinderella chapter 2
10	October 24, 2008	978-4-09-132108-4
Game 4...-44
