= Punch! =

Japanese manga series

- Cover of the first manga volume

パンチ! (Panchi!)
- Genre: Comedy, martial arts
- Manga
- Written by: Rie Takada
- Published by: Shogakukan
- English publisher: NA: Viz Media
- Magazine: Shōjo Comic
- Original run: 2005 – 2006
- Volumes: 3

Punch! (パンチ!, Panchi!) is a manga written by Rie Takada, creator of Happy Hustle High. The series is published in Japan by Shogakukan, and in the United States in English by VIZ Media.

== Plot ==
Punch! is about a young girl named Elle Nagahara, whose family are all involved in martial arts: her mother was a wrestling champion, her father a world lightweight boxing champion, and her grandfather the first Japanese to become the world champion of Muay Thai kickboxing. Elle does not want to fight and wants a normal life, but her life changes when she meets a street fighter.

== Characters ==
Elle Nagahara
The main character and daughter of two champion parents, but doesn't want anything to do with her family business and only wishes to live a normal teenage life. She was betrothed by her grandfather to Ruo, her childhood friend. However, she does not want to marry Ruo and wishes only to have a normal relationship. To avoid marrying Ruo, she lies that her boyfriend is Kazuki Shindo, a boy she happened to run into in a music store, but begins to develop a genuine relationship with Kazuki. Elle goes on an actually "normal" date with him, but it is cancelled when she burns herself while making lunch. Elle soon finds that she loves Kazuki and tells Kazuki (in her sleep) her true feelings and he feels the same. Volume 2 ends with Elle finding Choppy (Kazuki's dog) at the front door.
Gigi Nagahara
Grandfather of Elle and owner of a dojo (gym), he made a promise to a long life rival that he would let his kid marry his rival's, but when they both only gave birth to sons, Elle was betrothed instead. He has an eyepatch on his left eye and is bald.
Ruo M. Eschuck
Childhood friend and Elle's ex-fiancé, he's a professional martial artist. Elle only sees him as a big brother, who gave her comfort when they were younger, however, Ruo is actually violently possessive of Elle and will do anything to alienate her from other men who might take her from him. He tends to put his male groupies up against anyone Elle may like or have a crush on, which makes her very distant from other men. In Volume 2, Ruo finds out that Kazuki has a younger sister and uses her for revenge by visiting her every day and giving her flowers, he also blackmails Kazuki with surgery money for Kazue's eye operation if Kazuki will leave Elle alone. Kazue soon finds out it was all a hoax and cancels the operation (and even her relationship with Ruo).
Kazuki Shindo
A street fighter who befriends Elle while she goes out to buy music. When she meets him for the first time, he confuses her by calling her "Choppy". During that time, he gets jumped by a couple of men but Elle ends up finding that he beats all of them. He then later joins her grandfather's gym and trains so that one day he can defeat Ruo. Later on in Volume 1, Elle founds out he had a dog name Choppy. He also gives Elle her first kiss. In Volume 2, Kazuki asks Elle on a date but it backfires as a small accident happens and Elle burns herself.
Hinako Komatsu
Elle's classmate who wishes to marry Ruo, so she tries to help her friend and break the marriage off between the two. In Volume 2, Hinako and Elle show more of their relationship together and how they use a sort of "soft" violence towards each other, meaning teasing and making fun of each other and even to a point of hitting each other playfully.
Kazue Shindo
Kazuki's blind younger sister. In Volume 2, she has a mild crush on Ruo who is only using her for revenge. She soon breaks it off when she finds out Ruo was only using her and refuses the money for the operation for her eye surgery. She lives by herself because her mother and father left her and Kazuki and Choppy. In Volume 1, she thought Elle was Choppy even though she is blind.
Choppy
Kazuki and Kazue's dog, she resembles Elle. She's a Pekingese. When she went to the gym, everybody thought Elle turned into a dog.

== Volumes ==
No.	Original release date	Original ISBN	English release date	English ISBN
1	September 2005	4-09-130204-1	November 7, 2006	978-1-4215-0874-0
Chapters 1–2
2	January 2006	4-09-130306-4	January 2, 2007	1-4215-0875-3
Chapters 3–4
3	April 2006	4-09-130413-3	March 6, 2007	978-1-4215-1031-6
Chapter 5; Anything Goes; Hibari Telepathy
