= Chocolate Vampire =

Japanese manga series

- First tankōbon volume cover

チョコレート・ヴァンパイア (Chokorēto Banpaia)
- Genre: Fantasy; Mystery; Romance
- Manga
- Written by: Kyoko Kumagai
- Published by: Shogakukan
- Imprint: Flower Comics
- Magazine: Sho-Comi
- Original run: September 20, 2016 – November 19, 2021
- Volumes: 18
- Manga

Chocolate Vampire Bitter Black
- Written by: Kyoko Kumagai
- Published by: Shogakukan
- Imprint: Flower Comics
- Magazine: Sho-Comi
- Original run: November 5, 2026 – present

Chocolate Vampire (チョコレート・ヴァンパイア, Chokorēto Banpaia) is a Japanese manga series written and illustrated by Kyoko Kumagai. It was serialized in Shogakukan's shōjo manga magazine Sho-Comi from September 2016 to November 2021.

== Plot ==
When they were kids, Chiyo and Setsu signed a contract where Chiyo would exclusively feed Setsu using her blood, and Setsu would exclusively drink Chiyo's blood. To the present day, they both attend Kagarizuki Academy, a high school where vampires and humans coexist. Chiyo is a member of the school's security team making sure vampires are in check, while Setsu likes to toy with Chiyo, much to her chagrin.

== Characters ==
Chiyo Misaki (美崎千代, Misaki Chiyo)
Voiced by: Ayaka Shimizu (drama CD)
Setsu Kagarizuki (篝月雪, Kagarizuki Setsu)
Voiced by: Shun Horie (drama CD)
Rin Kagarizuki (篝月霖, Kagarizuki Rin)
Voiced by: Azusa Tadokoro (drama CD)
Raika Kagarizuki (篝月雷火, Kagarizuki Raika)
Voiced by: Shuta Morishima (drama CD)
Kasumi Kagarizuki (篝月霞, Kagarizuki Kasumi)
Voiced by: Kenji Nojima (drama CD)
Kō Shirogane (白銀紅, Shirogane Kō)
Voiced by: Shōhei Komatsu (drama CD)
Sumire Shirogane (白銀菫, Shirogane Sumire)
Voiced by: Yō Taichi (drama CD)
Fuyuga Suwa (諏訪冬伽, Suwa Fuyuga)
Voiced by: KENN (drama CD)

== Media ==
=== Manga ===
Written and illustrated by Kyoko Kumagai, Chocolate Vampire was serialized in Shogakukan's shōjo manga magazine Sho-Comi from September 20, 2016, to November 19, 2021. Its chapters were collected in eighteen tankōbon volumes from January 26, 2017, to February 25, 2022.

An official fan book was released on July 26, 2018.

A sequel titled Chocolate Vampire Bitter Black began serialization in Sho-Comi on November 5, 2026.

No.	Release date	ISBN
1	January 26, 2017	978-4-09-139149-0
2	April 26, 2017	978-4-09-139346-3
3	July 26, 2017	978-4-09-139480-4
4	October 26, 2017	978-4-09-139746-1
5	January 26, 2018	978-4-09-870001-1
6	May 25, 2018	978-4-09-870088-2; 978-4-09-943017-7 (SE)
6.5	July 26, 2018	978-4-09-870225-1
7	September 26, 2018	978-4-09-870221-3
8	December 26, 2018	978-4-09-870297-8; 978-4-09-943036-8 (SE)
9	March 26, 2019	978-4-09-870383-8
10	June 26, 2019	978-4-09-870483-5; 978-4-09-943051-1 (SE)
11	October 25, 2019	978-4-09-870702-7
12	March 26, 2020	978-4-09-870718-8
13	June 26, 2020	978-4-09-871047-8
14	October 26, 2020	978-4-09-871136-9
15	January 26, 2021	978-4-09-871223-6
16	April 26, 2021	978-4-09-871329-5
17	August 26, 2021	978-4-09-871448-3
18	February 25, 2022	978-4-09-871614-2; 978-4-09-943103-7 (SE)

=== Other ===
Several drama CDs have been released inside the special editions of volumes 6, 8, 10 and 18.

== Reception ==
By February 2022, the series had over 2.7 million copies in circulation.

The series was nominated for the 64th Shogakukan Manga Award in the shōjo category.
