= Rie Takada =

Japanese manga artist

- Born: August 10; Hokkaidō, Japan
- Occupation: Manga artist
- Employer: Shogakukan
- Known for: Happy Hustle High, Wild Act

Rie Takada (高田 りえ, Takada Rie) (born August 10) is a Japanese manga artist. She debuted in 1990 in the 17th issue of the manga anthology magazine Sho-Comi with the series SP girl. She still writes primarily for Sho-Comi, with her serialized works also published in collected volumes by Shogakukan, the company that publishes Sho-Comi.

== List of works ==
- (1990) SP Girl
- (1992) Toppu Redeī wo Mezase! (トップレディーを目指せ！; lit. To be the Top Lady!)
- (1993) Toraburu Kikku (トラぶる・キック; lit. Trouble Kick)
- (1993) Dan Dan Aishite (DAN DAN愛して; lit. Loving You More and More)
- (1994) Dan Dan Dakishimete (DAN DAN抱きしめて; lit. Holding You Tighter and Tighter)
- (1994) Manatsu no Koibito (真夏の恋人) lit. Midsummer Lovers
- (1996) Hadashi no Aitsu (裸足のアイツ) lit. That Barefoot Guy
- (1998) Wild☆Act (WILD☆ACT); English translation: Wild Act (2003)
- (2000) Rabu Gecchu (らぶげっちゅ; lit. Love Get You)
- (2001) Hāto (ハート; lit. Heart)
- (2003) H3 Sukuuru (H3スクール!); English translation: Happy Hustle High (2005)
- (2005) Punch! (Punch!); English translation: Punch! (2006)
- (2005) Nandemo Arisa (ナンでもありさ; lit. Anything Goes Arisa)
- (2006) Ren'ai Torippā (恋愛☆トリッパー; lit. Love Tripper)
- (2007) Hādo na Choukyoushi (ハードな調教師; lit. A Hard Trainer)
- (2007) Gaba Kawa (ガバ・カワ); English translation: Gaba Kawa (2008)
- (2008) Futari wa Oshiri Ai (ふたりはおしり愛)
- (2009) Oshiri Ai -Shinsatsu Uchi- (おしり愛―診察中―)
- (2009) Kicchin Paretto (キッチン パレット; lit. Kitchen Palette)
- (2011) Hitofude Nyuukon (一筆入婚; lit. With One Stroke We're Married)
- (2013) Boku no Kanojo wa Youjinbou (僕の彼女は用心棒; lit. My Girlfriend is a Bodyguard)
