= Miyasaka =

Miyasaka (written: 宮坂 or 宮阪) is a Japanese surname. Notable people with the surname include:

- Emiri Miyasaka (宮坂 絵美里, born 1984), Japanese actress, model, dancer and beauty pageant winner
- Kaho Miyasaka (宮坂 香帆), Japanese manga artist
- Masaki Miyasaka (宮阪 政樹, born 1989), Japanese footballer
- Seidai Miyasaka (宮坂 正大, born 1955), Japanese astronomer
- Tsutomu Miyasaka (宮坂 力, born 1953), Japanese engineer in electrochemistry

== See also ==
- 3555 Miyasaka, a main-belt asteroid
