= Miseinen Dakedo Kodomo Janai =

Japanese manga

- Cover of the Japanese version of vol. 1, first released on April 26, 2013

未成年だけどコドモじゃない
- Genre: Romantic comedy
- Manga
- Written by: Kanan Minami
- Published by: Shogakukan
- Imprint: Flower Comics
- Magazine: Sho-Comi
- Original run: December 5, 2012 – February 5, 2016
- Volumes: 5
- Live-action film
- Directed by: Tsutomu Hanabusa
- Written by: Keiko Hokimoto
- Music by: Masaru Yokoyama
- Released: December 23, 2017

Miseinen Dakedo Kodomo Janai (Japanese: 未成年だけどコドモじゃない; "I May Be a Minor, But I'm Not a Child"; alternatively titled Teen Bride internationally for the live-action film) is a Japanese manga series by Kanan Minami. Miseinen Dakedo Kodomo Janai was serialized in the semi-monthly shōjo manga magazine Sho-Comi from December 5, 2012, to February 5, 2016. A live-action film adaptation of the same name was released on December 23, 2017, with the international title Teen Bride.

== Plot ==
Karin Oriyama is a first-year high school student who has spent her entire life living in luxury and being spoiled by her father. She sets her sights on Nao Tsurugi, a popular third-year student at her school, and believes him to be the perfect candidate for her boyfriend. On her 16th birthday, Karin's father suddenly announces that she will be wed to Nao, who she had been secretly betrothed to since birth. Overjoyed with the news, Karin and Nao marry and move into a run-down apartment building to spend their newlywed life. To Karin's surprise, however, Nao confesses that he agreed to the marriage for financial independence, and he wants nothing to do with her. He proposes several rules for their co-habitance: they must not mention they are married at school; they must cook and clean after themselves; they must not enter each other's rooms; and they are allowed to date other people. Karin is crushed by the reality of her marriage, but she must overcome her ego and become more self-sufficient to earn Nao's respect.

== Characters ==
Karin Oriyama (折山 香琳, Oriyama Karin)
Voiced by: Nao Tōyama (movie comic); portrayed by: Yuna Taira (film)
Karin is a 16-year-old daughter from a nouveau riche family. Owing to her father spoiling her since childhood, Karin is initially arrogant and haughty, but she learns to take care of herself when she moves in to live with Nao. She has a positive outlook on life and is determined to make Nao fall in love with her.
Nao Tsurugi (鶴木 尚, Tsurugi Nao)
Voiced by: Yoshitsugu Matsuoka (movie comic); portrayed by: Kento Nakajima (film)
Nao is a third-year student who is popular at school for his friendly personality, high grades, and athleticism. He agrees to marry Karin only for financial gain and independence from his parents. After his parents' company became bankrupt, their fights have caused Nao to get occasional panic attacks and avoid getting into romantic relationships. Nao initially wants nothing to do with Karin, but he slowly becomes fond of her the more time they spend together.
Isuzu Ebina (海老名 五十鈴, Ebina Isuzu)
Voiced by: Kōdai Sakai (movie comic); portrayed by: Yuri Chinen (film)
Isuzu is Karin's childhood friend, who she nicknames "Rin Rin." He is popular at school for his androgynous looks, but because Karin had always defended him from unwanted attention, he is in love with her. He resents Nao for marrying her, but he is often viewed as immature due to his selfishness and age. He is from a wealthy family with a highly influential background.
Saaya Matsui (松井 沙綾, Matsui Saaya)
Portrayed by: Maika Yamamoto (film)
Saaya is Nao's ex-girlfriend.

== Media ==
=== Manga ===
Miseinen Dakedo Kodomo Janai is written and illustrated by Kanan Minami. It was serialized in the semi-monthly magazine Sho-Comi from December 5, 2012 to February 5, 2016. The chapters were later released in 5 bound volumes by Shogakukan under the Flower Comics imprint. The series was published with the English subtitle "That is Not a Child, But a Minor."

No.	Japanese release date	Japanese ISBN
1	April 26, 2013	9784091351791
2	July 26, 2013	9784091353504
3	November 26, 2013	9784091356291
4	June 26, 2014	9784091360335
5	April 26, 2016	9784091384256

=== Movie comic ===
A series of movie comics, featuring voiceovers to comic panels, was broadcast on dTV on September 8, 2017. The movie comic's theme song is "Shhh..." by lol.

=== Film ===
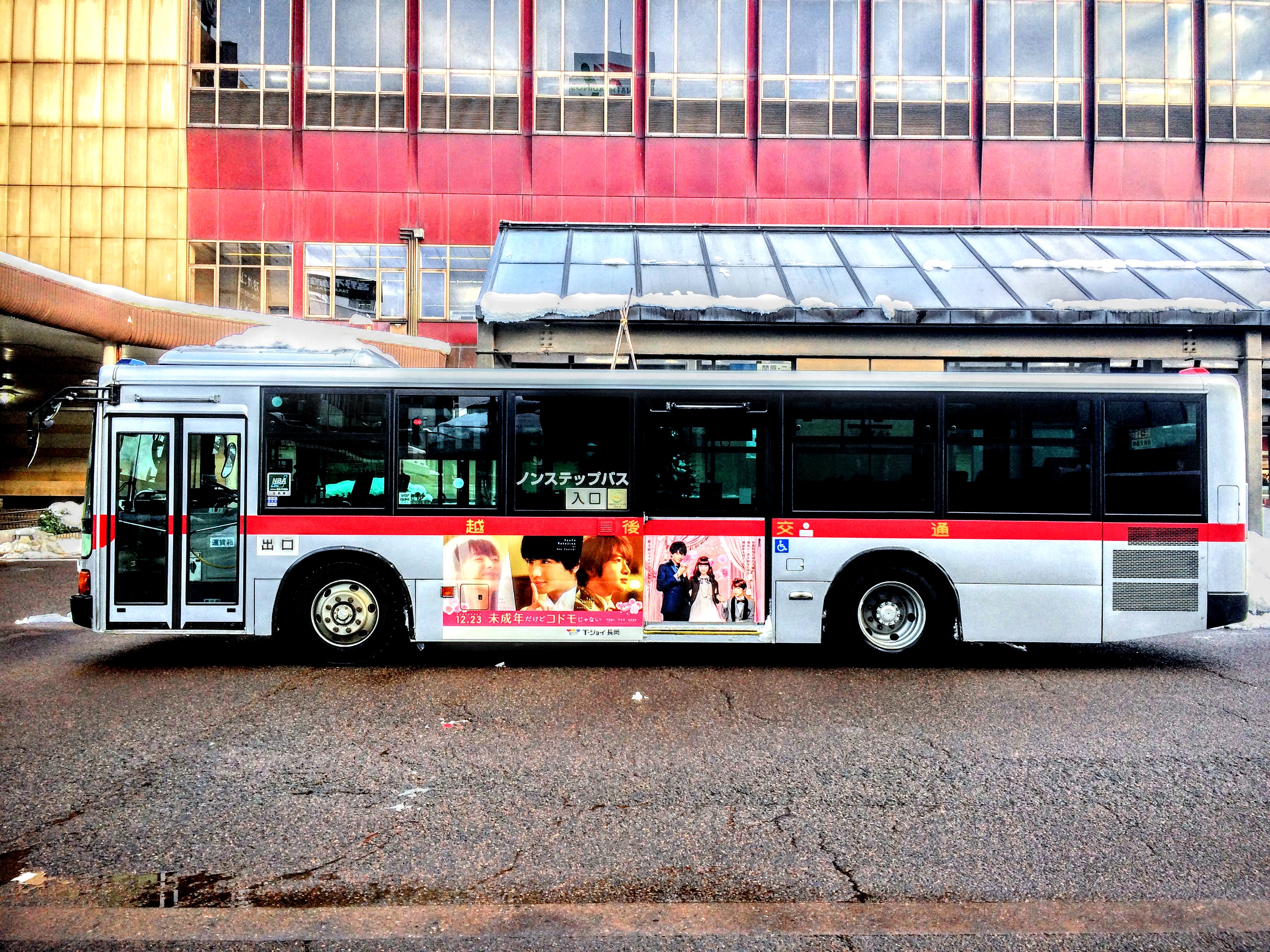
Bus advertisement for the film in 2017

In June 2017, Sho-Comi announced that a live-action film adaptation was slated for a nationwide release in Japanese theaters on December 23, 2017. The film is directed by Tsutomu Hanabusa and stars Yuna Taira as Karin, Sexy Zone member Kento Nakajima as Nao, and Hey! Say! JUMP member Yuri Chinen as Isuzu. Maika Yamamoto was announced as an additional cast member in September 2017. The film's theme song is "White Love" by Hey! Say! JUMP. The film is also titled Teen Bride for international markets.

The film grossed ¥617,785,300 at box office after its 5th week in theaters. The Blu-ray home release sold a cumulative total of 6,354 copies in its first week.

== Reception ==
The first volume of Miseinen Dakedo Kodomo Janai sold over 200,000 physical copies, making it one of Shogakukan's highest first printings. Volume 5 debuted at #15 on Oricon, selling 66,451 physical copies on its first week, and 96,032 physical copies overall.

Karin's character has been compared to Noa from Minami's older work, Rhapsody in Heaven. Minami acknowledged the difference in reactions Karin garnered compared to the more sympathetic responses from Kyō, Koi o Hajimemasu.
