= Aoi Kiriya =

Aoi Kiriya may refer to:

- Aoi Kiriya (Aikatsu!) (霧矢 あおい), a character in the anime series Aikatsu!
- Aoi Kiriya (桐矢 葵), a character in the manga series Kare First Love
