= Tsugi wa Ii yo ne, Senpai =

Japanese manga series

- First tankōbon volume cover

次はいいよね、先輩
- Genre: Coming-of-age, romance
- Manga
- Written by: Marina Umezawa
- Published by: Shogakukan
- Imprint: Flower Comics
- Magazine: Sho-Comi
- Original run: July 5, 2021 – present
- Volumes: 14

Tsugi wa Ii yo ne, Senpai (次はいいよね、先輩) is a Japanese manga series written and illustrated by Marina Umezawa. It began serialization in Shogakukan's shōjo manga magazine Sho-Comi in July 2021.

== Synopsis ==
Mao Hanasaki missed school to search for her missing boyfriend Izumi, causing her to repeat the year. She was tasked with cleaning out Izumi's old locker for the soccer club members, but she couldn't forget about Izumi and cried in secret. Her behavior was noticed by Shun Hachiya, a cheeky junior in the club, who confessed to her, "Let's redo our youth together."

Mao is unable to answer immediately and is given two weeks to respond. Although she never thought she would fall in love again, after two weeks she falls in love with Hachiya and they start dating.

== Characters ==
Mao Hanasaki (花咲真緒, Hanasaki Mao)
Voiced by: Chinatsu Akasaki (voice comic)
Shun Hachiya (蜂谷瞬, Hachiya Shun)
Voiced by: Soma Saito (voice comic)
Runa Usami (宇佐美瑠奈, Usami Runa)
Voiced by: Yū Sasahara (voice comic)
Hayato Kōchō (高蝶速人, Kōchō Hayato)
Voiced by: Taku Yashiro (vomic)
Yuma Izumi (和泉遊馬, Izumi Yuma)
Voiced by: Atsushi Tamaru (voice comic)

== Publication ==
Written and illustrated by Marina Umezawa, Tsugi wa Ii yo ne, Senpai began serialization in Shogakukan's shōjo manga magazine Sho-Comi on July 5, 2021. Its chapters have been compiled into fourteen tankōbon volumes as of January 2026.

No.	Release date	ISBN
1	October 26, 2021	978-4-09-871539-8
2	January 26, 2022	978-4-09-871611-1
3	April 26, 2022	978-4-09-871676-0
4	July 26, 2022	978-4-09-871734-7
5	August 26, 2022	978-4-09-871739-2
6	December 26, 2022	978-4-09-871829-0
7	March 24, 2023	978-4-09-872063-7
8	July 26, 2023	978-4-09-872106-1
9	October 26, 2023	978-4-09-872201-3
10	February 26, 2024	978-4-09-872469-7
11	August 26, 2024	978-4-09-872588-5
12	February 26, 2025	978-4-09-872781-0
13	August 26, 2025	978-4-09-873139-8
14	January 26, 2026	978-4-09-873298-2

== Reception ==
By March 2024, the series had over 1 million copies in circulation.
