= So Cute it Hurts!! =

Japanese manga series

- Volume 1 cover art

小林が可愛すぎてツライっ!! (Kobayashi ga Kawai Sugite Tsurai!!)
- Genre: Comedy, romance
- Manga
- Written by: Gō Ikeyamada
- Published by: Shogakukan
- English publisher: NA: Viz Media; SG: Shogakukan Asia
- Magazine: Sho-Comi
- Original run: August 2012 – August 2015
- Volumes: 15
- Original video animation
- Released: July 26, 2013
- Runtime: 15 minutes each
- Episodes: 2
- Video game

Kobayashi ga Kawai Sugite Tsurai!! Ge-mu demo Kyun Moe MAX ga Tomaranai (*´ェ`*) (小林が可愛すぎてツライっ!! ゲームでもキュン萌えMAXが止まらないっ(*´ェ`*))
- Publisher: Happinet
- Genre: Otome, dating sim, visual novel
- Platform: Nintendo 3DS
- Released: JP: August 27, 2015

So Cute It Hurts!! (Japanese: 小林が可愛すぎてツライっ!!, Hepburn: Kobayashi ga Kawai Sugite Tsurai!!; lit. "Kobayashi is So Cute it Hurts!!"), is a Japanese manga series written and illustrated by Gō Ikeyamada. It was adapted into an original video animation, included in volume 3 limited edition of the series. The manga series ran in the Sho-Comi manga magazine from 2012 to 2015, and was compiled into 15 tankobon volumes. An English translation was published by Viz Media, and in Southeast Asia, it was published by Shogakukan Asia.

== Plot ==
Twin siblings Megumu and Mitsuru Kobayashi are now attending separate high schools. Megumu, nicknamed Mego, hangs out with her two school friends as they share otaku interests. Mitsuru is more of a ladies' man and a fighter. One day, Mitsuru and Mego switch places and cross-dress so that Mego can take Mitsuru's exams. Mego runs into trouble with a delinquent guy who wants to fight her, and then bumps into Aoi Sanada, the school's top fighter and lone wolf who wears an eyepatch and who had saved her from a fall earlier. Meanwhile, Mitsuru tries to save Shino Takenaka, a deaf classmate, from the bullying of the school's queen bee, Azusa Tokugawa. Mitsuru falls in love with Shino, while Mego falls in love with Aoi. They exchange places again, and encounter more interactions, including that Azusa has become attracted to Mitsuru as a guy.

== Characters ==
Megumu Kobayashi (小林 愛, Kobayashi Megumu)
Voiced by: Ayumi Fujimura (OVA), Ayahi Takagaki (game)
Megumu, nicknamed Mego, is the twin sister of Mitsuru. Her name was based on Megohime, Japanese warlord Date Masamune's wife. She is an otaku in Japanese historical video games and holds a deep admiration for Date Masamune.^{Ch. 1} During her swap with Mitsuru, Mego befriends and falls in love with school delinquent Aoi Sanada, a boy with a troubled past and an eye patch, similar to Masamune's.^{Ch. 3} She holds a deep love for Aoi, as evidenced by her kissing Aoi's scar and accepting it. Towards the manga's conclusion, Mego marries Aoi and has a daughter named Ibuki.
Mitsuru Kobayashi (小林 十, Kobayashi Mitsuru)
Voiced by: Ayumi Fujimura (OVA), Ayahi Takagaki (game)
Mitsuru is the twin brother of Mego. He is very skilled in kendo and is one of his school's top fighters.^{Ch. 1-2} Mitsuru falls in love with Shino at first sight while he and Mego have exchanged identities, however eventually gives up on pursuing Shino after discovering her feelings for someone else. Whilst recovering from the loss of Shino, he gradually falls in love with Azusa. When he learns of Azusa's history with Shino and the fact that they are half-sisters, it finally gives him the push he needs to confess his feelings properly to her. When the whole scandal with Azusa's parents comes to light, not wanting her to suffer any longer, Mitsuru makes a grand entrance at her home and boldly proposes to her stating that he will make up for all the love she never received as a child and more. At the end of the manga, Mitsuru marries Azusa and they have twins, a boy and a girl.
Aoi Sanada (真田 蒼, Sanada Aoi)
Voiced by: Daisuke Ono
Aoi is his school's top fighter,^{Ch. 3} however, he has a troubled past that resulted in him wearing an eyepatch over his right eye. Aoi meets Mego when she falls down of the stairs of a bridge^{Ch. 1} and he gradually falls in love with Mego during her and Mitsuru's identity exchange, leading Aoi to question his sexuality due to him being unaware of Mego's true gender. Aoi also has a phobia towards women which renders him unable to be closer than 2 feet of a woman lest he pass out.^{Ch. 6-7} Due to the scar under Aoi's eyepatch, his mother abandoned both him and Shino, his half-sister; thus resulting in him being afraid of anyone seeing the scar as they might leave him as his mother once did. It is revealed later on in the manga that the scar on his eye and shoulder were a result from a fire that burned down his home and killed his father. He and Shino have a younger sibling called Akane who is the only son of their lost mother; both Aoi and Akane develop a strong friendship. Near the end of the manga, he marries Mego and had a daughter named Ibuki. Ikeyamada has remarked that she always wanted to create a character that had an eyepatch into her stories.^{Vol. 1 notes}
Shino Takenaka (竹中 紫乃, Takenaka Shino)
Shino is a student in Mego's high school. An aspiring author, Shino is deaf and therefore can only communicate through writing and sign language. Mitsuru falls in love with her while he is posing as Mego, coming to her rescue while she is being tormented by Azusa.^{Ch. 2} Shino is the half-sister to both Aoi and Azusa; she and Azusa share fathers while both her and Aoi have the same mother. Tormented and bullied by Azusa, her life vastly improves once she meets Mitsuru (disguised as Mego), who vows to protect her. She later becomes romantically involved with a university student due to a sacrificial push from Mitsuru, later marrying the former and having a daughter with him named Shiori. At the end of the manga, she and Mego write a children's book together. Near the end of the book at Shino's marriage, she realizes that her best friend wasn't Megumu, but it was Mitsuru and spoke out loud for the first time. Ikeyamada noted that she wanted to include a character that uses sign language, having taken a course in it when she was younger.^{Vol. 1 notes}
Azusa Tokugawa (徳川梓, Tokugawa Azusa)
Voiced by: Azumi Asakura (OVA), Yū Serizawa (game)
Azusa is a popular student at Mego's school; she is a teenage model and the daughter of the school chairman. She has an outwardly pleasant demeanor, however is seemingly a manipulative and sadistic bully to Shino as well as anyone who gets in her way.^{Ch. 1} After vowing to protect Shino, Mitsuru unintentionally wages an unfriendly rivalry with her, resulting in Azusa using her power to torture Mitsuru and anyone who sides with him. Failing to do so, Azusa unintentionally discovers "Mego" is really Mitsuru. Having the power to expose him, she decides not to as she realizes she has feelings for Mitsuru, begrudgingly falling in love with him. It is revealed that she and Shino are half-sisters and Azusa bullied Shino as her father loves Shino and her mother more than her and Azusa's mother. Azusa and Mitsuru become a couple and at the manga's conclusion, have twins.
Chiharu Uesugi (上杉千春, Uesugi Chiharu)
Voiced by: Shouta Aoi
Aoi's best friend from middle school, who has seen under Aoi's eyepatch. When he and Aoi were young, they became fast friends due to Chiharu's admiration towards Aoi. It was because of this that they would always hang out together and often wound up in fights together. One day, Chiharu was admitted to the hospital which is where his family found out he had a conditional heart defect. Due to this, Aoi felt it was his fault that the condition got worse so he began to avoid Chiharu for his own safety. Misunderstanding this, Chiharu believed Aoi abandoned him because he was too weak. Chiharu bore a grudge against Aoi and confronted him on the school rooftop where he accidentally knocked off Aoi's eyepatch and was initially horrified by what he saw. It was after this that both separated with Aoi transferring schools and Chiharu going to the hospital to receive a heart surgery. Chiharu searched endlessly for Aoi over the years until he came across Megumu at the park one day and saw her sketches of him. It was after this that he began to provoke Aoi, albeit using Mego, but soon realized that he actually came to like her in the process. After a confrontation with Aoi, Megumu is able to see through the deception and called out to Chiharu saying he never really hated Aoi and only wanted his recognition and attention. Chiharu denies this, but Megumu says she can see it because she likes Aoi so she also wishes for the same thing. After stating this, Megumu faints from her fever and Chiharu is finally able to have a talk with Aoi. Chiharu apologizes to Aoi for having been afraid of his scars and both are able to clear their misunderstandings and reconcile, however Chiharu states that if Aoi ever lets his guard down then he will take Megumu away from him.

== Reception ==
Volume 1 reached a total of 117,197 copies by January 13, 2013, on the Oricon manga chart. Volume 2 reached the second place on the week of March 25 to March 21, 2013, with 100,762 copies. Volume 3 reached a total of 143,886 copies by August 11, 2013. Volume 4 reached the 7th place on the week of August 21 to September 1, 2013, with 113,820 copies.

== Works cited ==
- "Ch." and "Vol." is shortened form for chapter and volume of the collected So Cute It Hurts!! manga. Volume numbering follows the Japanese version and not the omnibus one.
- "Ep." is shortened form for episode and refers to an episode number of the collected So Cute It Hurts anime
