= Kanan Minami =

Japanese manga artist

Kanan Minami 水波 風南
- Born: November 12, 1979 (age 47) Saitama Prefecture, Japan
- Area: Manga artist
- Notable works: Kyō, Koi o Hajimemasu, Honey x Honey Drops

Kanan Minami (水波 風南, Minami Kanan; born November 12, 1979 in Saitama Prefecture) is a shōjo manga artist. She is best known for Honey x Honey Drops, which has been licensed in multiple languages and adapted as an original video animation (OVA). Her current series, Kyō, Koi o Hajimemasu, is a best-seller that regularly appears on the Tohan comics charts. She writes mainly for Shōjo Comic. She has sold more than 10 million copies. On the Nikkei Entertainment magazine's list of top 50 manga creators by the amount of sales since January 2010, Kanan Minami ranked 24 out of the 50 manga creators. Her representative work for the sales is Kyō, Koi o Hajimemasu. She sold 2,498,000 copies.

== Personal life ==
Minami gave birth to a daughter in 2014.

== Manga ==
List of manga works
Title	Year	Notes	Refs
Kyō, Koi o Hajimemasu (今日、恋をはじめます)	2008–11	Serialized in Sho-Comi by Shogakukan; Published by Flower Comics, 15 volumes released	
Honey x Honey Drops (蜜×蜜ドロップス)	2004–06	Serialized in Sho-Comi by Shogakukan; Published by Flower Comics, 8 volumes released	
Perfect Partner (ja:パーフェクト・パートナー, Pāfekuto pātonā)	2002 (vol.)	Published by Flower Comics/Small Komi Flower Comics, 1 volume released	
Ren'aishijōshugi (ja:レンアイ至上主義)	2003–04 (vol.)	Published by Flower Comics/Small Komi Flower Comics, 8 volumes released	
Kakene nashi no LOVE torihiki (ja:掛け値ナシのLOVE取引)	2001 (vol.)	Published by Flower Comics/Small Komi Flower Comics, 1 volume released	
Miseinen Dakedo Kodomo Janai	2012–16 (vol.)	Published by Sho-Comi / Flower Comics, 5 volumes released	
Rhapsody in Heaven (ja:狂想ヘヴン, Kyō sō hevun)	2007 (vol.)	Published by Flower Comics/Small Komi Flower Comics, 3 volumes released	
Chain of Pearls	2002	Serialized in Shojo Comic; Published by Flower Comics/Small Komi Flower Comics, 2 volumes released	
Shiikuhime (ja:飼育姫)	2006 (vol.)	Published by Flower Comics/Small Komi Flower Comics, 1 volume released	

== As contributor ==
List of anthologies contributed
Title	Year	Notes	Refs
Love & SexSHO-COMI Pink Label	2003 (vol.)	Published by Flower Comics, 1 volumes released	
Koi, pinku. Watashi no kimochi, kiite kureru? (恋、ぴんく。私の気持ち、聞いてくれる?)	2013 (vol.)	Published by Sho-Comi Flower Comics/Sho-Comi Girls Collection, 1 volumes released	
Shinkon ♥ gentei mesukōseidakedo, kekkon shimasu (新婚♥限定女子高生だけど、結婚します)	2014 (vol.)	Published by Sho-Comi Flower Comics/Sho-Comi Girl's Collection, 1 volume released	
Geki ai motto motometai (激愛もっと求めたい)	2006 (vol.)	Published by Sho-Comi Pink Label / Small Comi Flower Comics, 1 volumereleased	
Neko kare kūru Sho-comi men' s collection (猫彼クールSho-comi men's collection)	2010 (vol.)	Published by Flower Comics, 1 volume released	
