= Binetsu Shōjo =

Japanese manga series

- Binetsu
- Cover of volume 1

微熱少女
- Genre: Romance
- Manga
- Written by: Kaho Miyasaka
- Published by: Shogakukan
- Magazine: Shōjo Comic
- Original run: 1999 – 2001
- Volumes: 10

Binetsu Shōjo (微熱少女) is a shōjo manga series by Kaho Miyasaka. The title can be translated in English as Feverish Girl.

== Plot ==
Binetsu Shōjo is about a girl named Rina, 15 years of age, who had a crush on a boy she usually sees in the train station every morning. Rina gather the courage to ask for the boy's name. It was so unfortunate, however, that her mother picked that time to shout her name and wave the flute she forgot at home. Embarrassed, she decided to hide from her mother and was saved by a boy with black hair, who turned out to be a friend of her crush! Later, she received VIP tickets from her crush, with a name on it 'Hiro Usami' for a live band concert. She was so happy that she has finally learned the boy's name.

At the concert, she learned her crush is the vocalist while her rescuer is the guitarist. She found it odd when everyone in the crowd chanted for Ryuji, with courage she started chanting loudly for Hiro (thinking that was the name is of her crush which later it turns out to be the name of the guitarist.) As a dare, Ryuji urged Hiro to take Rina on a date. The crowd changed and Hiro jumped off the stage and carries Rina away to an undisclosed location. It appears that she passed out after all that drama. When she woke up she sees a different aspect of Hiro though they did not know each other that well, he reached for her and kissed her.

Was it a simple dare act or will this love blossom?

== Main characters ==
Rina Kisagari
The Center of Attention. She is a naive girl and has a habit of fainting due to her weak physical condition. She thinks too much and talks to herself a lot.
Hiro Usami
The Lover. He is the vice captain of archery club at his high school. He helped Rina several times. He is quiet, a bit of an introvert and has a very low tolerance for alcohol. He sometimes plays the guitar in Ryuji's band whenever he was asked to help. Later, he becomes quite popular. He has four brothers who look alike. He thought he was in love with Taki but realized he loved Rina.
Ryuji Takayanagi
He is the vocalist of the band and very popular with the girls. He is cheerful, out-going and yet curious. He worries about Rina and Hiro's relationship to the point of stalking.
Taki Akimoto
A female member of the Archery Club. She is Hiro's first love. Ryuji, Taki and Hiro are childhood friends. She is a cheerful girl. Taki cheers on Rina's love for Hiro, to the point of stalking.
Natsuki Otowa
Rina's first love and the captain of the Archery Club. He used to live next door to Rina until his family moved away.
Kasuto Arima
A new guitarist in Ryuji's band. He is easily put off and have been very tactful in making Rina his girlfriend. His uncle owns the hospital where Rina goes for her check-up.
Yuri Shirakawa
Hiro's kohai in middle school and is secretly in love with him. She is very good with archery. She enters to Hiro's high school and Archery Club. A very cunning young lady, she picks on Rina a lot in order to break Rina's and Hiro's relationship.
Mrs Kisaragi
Rina's mom. She is very strict yet she is concern for Rina's safety at all time.
Mr Kisaragi
Rina's dad. He is very easy going, and he is always in the middle of fights between Mrs Kisaragi and Rina. He loves spoiling his daughter and the family cat.
Mr. Yamada
Kisaragi's family cat. Always grumpy.

== Publications ==
=== Volumes ===
1. ISBN 4-09-137197-3 published on February 24, 1999
2. ISBN 4-09-137198-1 published on May 26, 1999
3. ISBN 4-09-137199-X published on August 24, 1999
4. ISBN 4-09-137200-7 published on November 26, 1991
5. ISBN 4-09-137861-7 published on February 26, 2000
6. ISBN 4-09-137862-5 published on May 26, 2000
7. ISBN 4-09-137863-3 published on September 26, 2000
8. ISBN 4-09-137864-1 published on January 26, 2001
9. ISBN 4-09-137865-X published on April 24, 2001
10. ISBN 4-09-137866-8 published on September 26, 2001

=== Bunko ===
1. Published on June 15, 2006
2. Published on June 15, 2006
3. Published on July 15, 2006
4. Published on July 15, 2006
