= Honey × Honey Drops =

Japanese manga series

蜜×蜜ドロップス (Mitsu × Mitsu Drops)
- Genre: Sports, Romance, School Life
- Manga
- Written by: Kanan Minami
- Published by: Shogakukan
- Magazine: Shōjo Comic
- Original run: 2004 – 2006
- Volumes: 8
- Original video animation
- Directed by: Mitsuhiro Tougou
- Studio: Radix Ace Entertainment
- Released: April 28, 2006
- Runtime: 27 minutes
- Episodes: 2
- Video game
- Developer: Idea Factory
- Publisher: Idea Factory
- Genre: ADV, Otome game
- Platform: PlayStation 2
- Released: April 6, 2006

Honey × Honey Drops (蜜×蜜ドロップス, Mitsu × Mitsu Drops) is a shōjo manga series created by Kanan Minami.

The first two volumes of the manga were adapted into a two-episode original video animation (OVA) in 2006. A dating sim adaptation of the manga, Honey × Honey Drops Love × Love Honey Life, was released as a PlayStation 2 game by Idea Factory on April 6, 2006.

== Plot ==
Hagino Yuzuru is a common girl who takes a normal course of Hojo High School. When she works a part-time job during summer break, she makes trouble with Renge Kai of the Kuge course which many rich people take. After the summer break, she finds that she was chosen as Kai's "HONEY". The HONEY is a partner of a MASTER, a Kuge course student, to take care of him until he graduates from the school, and the HONEY is chosen from the normal course student. The HONEY is exempted from paying tuition fee. It is a fascinating condition for Yuzuru because her family is badly off. However, if she quits being HONEY, she will be expelled from the school. Getting involved with Renge Kai, one of the special students, could be a big mistake for Yuzuru.

== Characters ==
Yuzuru Hagino (萩乃 柚留, Hagino Yuzuru)
Voiced by: Misato Fukuen
An ordinary student in Hojo High School. Since she carelessly offended Kai during her summer job, she becomes Kai's Honey during this semester. At first Yuzuru doesn't like Kai because he always finds ways to sexually harass Yuzuru (which makes her feel empty since she feels nothing but a play-thing), but later she finds out Kai harasses her because he is attracted to her, and she realizes that she doesn't mind it as much as she did before. Yuzuru's parents are very greedy and rapacious; they are very poor as well to the point where their loyalties are easily swayed and bought by whoever pays the most. Yuzuru performs badly in both her studies and sports, and constantly refers to herself as "such a measly Honey" or "a Honey like me" (because she's afraid of displeasing him, and not being the best she can be for him). She needs to be reassured occasionally that she's not at fault and that even though she doesn't do things the way other Honeys do, Kai still loves her and wants HER, not any other Honey. She detests Kai at first but finally falls in love with him later on. Since Chihaya once encroached upon her, Yuzuru is afraid of him. Throughout the manga series, Yuzuru and Kai remain in love despite what Chihaya does to separate them. Later Kai proposes to Yuzuru during a bath, and she accepts. They marry in the last chapter.
Kai Renge (煉夏 可威, Renge Kai)
Voiced by: Kenichi Suzumura
A student in Houjou High School. He is Yuzuru's master and was born into a very rich family—"The Renge Family" (Lotus Clan). At first, Kai thinks Yuzuru is only a toy for him to play tricks with (and sexually harass), however soon he falls in love with her. Since the other masters of the 9 flowers found their true honeys in elementary school, Kai was envious and desperately wanted to find his own honey for himself. Although Kai thought Yuzuru was just another weak and careless honey which was not meant for him and thought she was going to quit, he soon sees that they were meant to be and does whatever it takes to keep her by his side. Kai does well at all sports (especially tennis and basketball). He also is despicably honest, even though the rest at his high school isn't, when it comes to the Drops Tournament (though, he does let himself go a bit that way, because he cannot risk to lose Yuzuru). He doesn't want Yuzuru to cheat, because it's the only chance he has to have fun and play ball with his classmates (since the Kugeka have really no club activities, and they never play basketball in PE). His academic results are also superb. In the manga, Kai is over-protective of Yuzuru, but loves her dearly. Later he proposes to Yuzuru during a bath, and she accepts.
Nayuta Sakuragi (桜樹 那由太, Sakuragi Nayuta)
Voiced by: Hisayoshi Suganuma
A student in Houjou High School, and Kai's best friend since his youth. Sakuragi is Kuki's Master. He is well-adept at sports. Nayuta always calls Yuzuru as "Yuzu-yuzu". He's very playful and loves games. He shows extreme loyalty to his friends, especially the ones he's known for a very long time, and takes any affront to them as an affront to himself.
Chihaya Yurioka (百合丘 千駿, Yurioka Chihaya)
Voiced by: Jun Fukuyama
A student in Hojo High School, who always seems to be dressed in a kimono and with a fan in hand. Chihaya lives in a traditional Japanese home. He seems to be unsupporting of Kai and kind to his Honey, but in truth, he is actually admires Kai to the point of being dangerously obsessed with him, and loathes his Honeys, especially the ones who he thinks are awkward or stupid and believes to a threat to his reputation and does whatever it takes to get them dropped, even manipulating or threatening others into aiding his cruel and demented ambition. Throughout the series, he causes a lot of trouble between Yuzuru and Kai, also due to his jealousy of Yuzuru for being able to monopolizes Kai, even knowing and admitting that what he does is wrong, along with even settling on being remembered as someone Kai hates.
Genjo Kuki (久喜 絃青, Kuki Genjō)
Voiced by: Takehito Koyasu
Sakuragi's honey; an intelligent man. Kuki is a very competent Honey and at time to time, gives Yuzuru helpful advice. Kuki is amazingly loyal to Sakuragi and vows that he will do anything for his master. He has been Nayuta Sakuragi's honey since he was in kindergarten, was responsible for getting him to take a nap and not have Nayuta worry about his parents. In that part, that's when Nayuta finally calms down because he played with Genjou's hair. So he would tug it a couple times, and it made Genjou really happy to be of service, and to be able to comfort Nayuta in such a simple way, with his hair. He never cuts his long hair as he does not want to cut away the hair that his master (Nayuta) has once touched. And so thus, he is bad at tying his hair, so usually Nayuta ends up tying his hair for him. Whenever Nayuta ties his hair, it's because it's the one thing he can do to help his honey, because it's the one thing Genjou's bad at. He also has a hair band that Nayuta gave to him a long time ago, and protects it. Genjo really likes Sakuragi. He will do anything for him.
He also came to care for Yuzuru as a friend and fellow honey, though not always the most helpful teaching, since it seem it cause Nayuta to act up.
Kayaka
A close childhood friend of Kai, Kuki and Nayuta. She is from a rich family like Kai. She believes herself an opposite of Yuzuru, being smart, skilled, and tomboyish, she is also bossy, brash, impulsive, boastful, and in some cases, emotionally fragile. She always had a crush on Kai to the point where she took the idea of the two of them getting married very seriously, even though it was just what their parents wanted and mostly because it was just a joke. It became an obsession of sort when before her heart operation, another girl her age died during her surgery despite having a 90% chance of success, becoming traumatized and hell-bent on telling Kai her feelings when she survive her operation. When returning she almost instantly grew to dislike Yuzuru for being Kai's Honey and her feelings for him, but grew to see her as a friend, and was almost even willing to accept the idea of Kai being with Yuzuru. Unfortunately, thanks to Yurioka's influence and Kayaka becoming more aware of Kai and Yuzuru's love for each other, she became more deranged, demented and cruel. She began to work with Toi and Yurioka, hell-bent on making Kai hers to the point she attempted to rape him, and get herself pregnant, along with taking sadistic pleasure in making Yuzuru suffer. However, Kai managed to backfire her plan and make her back off in order to retrieve Yuzuru's funding. Due to her actions, she was sent back abroad with Toi, but not before, after coming back to her senses, somewhat making amends with Yuzuru, in a way acknowledging her as Kai's lover. She is last seen at Kai and Yuzuru's wedding, having married Toi a little bit before.
Toi
Kai's bank accountant, In charge of his funds, including Yuzuru's. Also always uses a chainsaw to break down locked doors. He is pushy, scheming, degenerated, selfish and treacherous. Even as Kai's accountant, he holds no true loyalty and appears resentful and bitter towards Kai instead. His true loyalty lies with the love of his life, Kayaka, and he is hell bent on doing whatever it takes to please her and satisfy her interests, even at the misery of others since he only sees them as obstacles in Kayaka's path and most likely sees Kai as a tool for Kayaka's deranged and twisted happiness. He went as far as to mostly likely allow Chihaya to forcefully drop his other honeys, thereby most likely being in some sort of alliance with him, and went as far as to send men to remove Yuzuru's earring, cut her fundings without permission, even attempt to allow Kayaka to almost rape Kai while he almost sends Yuzuru to be raped by Chihaya. However after the plan backfires on Kayaka and almost beats Kai for hurting her, despite knowing what she was trying to do, he allows the fundings to be recovered and was fired. But he was somehow hired to be Kayaka's care taker and resolved to steal her heart, which eventually succeed as they marry sometime before Yuzuru and Kai.

== Game ==
An otome game published and developed by Idea Factory was released on both limited and regular editions on April 6, 2006. The game uses the manga designs.

== Volumes ==
- 2004-12-20 (Japanese Volume 1)
- 2005-01-26 (Japanese Volume 2)
- 2005-05-26 (Japanese Volume 3)
- 2005-08-26 (Japanese Volume 4)
- 2005-11-25 (Japanese Volume 5)
- 2006-02-24 (Japanese Volume 6)
- 2006-06-26 (Japanese Volume 7)
- 2018-09-26 (Japanese Volume 8)
