= Happy Hustle High =

Japanese manga series

- Cover of the first manga volume

H3スクール! (Eichi Surī Sukūru!)
- Genre: Romance
- Manga
- Written by: Rie Takada
- Published by: Shogakukan
- English publisher: NA: Viz Media
- Magazine: Shōjo Comic
- Original run: 2004 – 2005
- Volumes: 5

Happy Hustle High, originally known as H3 School! (Japanese: H3(エッチスリー)スクール!, Hepburn: Eichi Surī Sukūru!), is a Japanese manga series written and illustrated by Rie Takada. The series is published in Japan by Shogakukan and in the United States in English by VIZ Media.

== Plot ==
Happy Hustle High follows the exploits of Hanabi Ozora. Hanabi is an assertive 16-year-old who protects her less assertive friends. The all-girls school that Hanabi attends, Uchino High School, is merged with Meibi High School, an all-boys school. Once there, Hanabi meets Yasuaki Garaku, a student council member who is also a surfer. Yasuaki expresses the fact that he has no interest in girls. When the Girls' council and the Boys' council start to fight, Hanabi jumps in, hoping that she can convince Yasuaki to change his mind.

== Characters ==
Hanabi Ozora (大空花美, Ōzora Hanabi)
Hanabi, the main character, is rowdy, hotheaded, and tough. She has wild and untamed hair which she claims only looks nice right after she showers and before it dries completely. She used to be a crybaby when she was little, but with the help of Takeru Suno, who helped boost her confidence, she is now an outspoken teenager who likes having her way. She went to an all-girls school until it turned co-ed. She leads the girls in their major activities, such as changing the school's rules or robbing perverts. She meets Yasuaki Garaku at the school's water fountain. She was late for the opening ceremony and he wordlessly pointed her in the right direction, having just returned from a morning surf. She stood up against the male student council members and got all three to sign an agreement to change the school rule that the boys and girls at the school were not allowed to date. Yasuaki challenged Hanabi to surf right into a major wave in order to get her to sign the agreement. She did, but nearly drowned in the process. He saved her and administered CPR, stealing her first hug and kiss. She frantically sought out a boyfriend so she could have a proper hug and kiss. Yasuaki took her to the beach and gave her a proper first hug and kiss. Her female classmates pushed her to be the only female student council member and went up against Yasuaki for the Vice President position. They played tennis against each other to vie for the spot in the newly integrated male/female student council. Yasuaki allowed her to win the title when he noticed that her ankle was injured. Yasuaki and Hanabi develop feelings for each other, but Hanabi is in denial of her true feelings in fear of messing up her friendship with Yasuaki. Yasuaki is more straightforward about his feelings. After asking Hanabi whether she liked him or not and admitting to the entire school of his intentions, Hanabi and Yasuaki begin to date. When Yasuaki introduced Hanabi to his brothers and father, she stood up to his tough father and eventually his father seemed to give his silent consent for their relationship. Later on Takeru came back for Hanabi making it a contest of childhood crush vs current boyfriend. She ended up choosing Yasuaki. Her parents are divorced. Her father is a reporter and a player who is often overseas and her mother is remarried and lives close by, leaving Hanabi alone most of the time. Hanabi described her mother as pretty flaky and lacks the courage to speak up to ask her to go to a parent-teacher conference.
Hanabi's friends (including Wakako)
Hanabi's submissive friends. Hanabi protects them from people such as lecherous teenage boys, sometimes in exchange for bentos.
Yasuaki Garaku (雅楽 恭明, Garaku Yasuaki)
His mother died very shortly after he was born. As a kid, he was surrounded by men and had no experience with girls. As a result he became rather overwhelmed by girls. His father was a musical conductor and his three brothers were all proficient at the violin and cello. However, Yasuaki was incredibly athletic and loved to go surfing. Hanabi guessed that Yasuaki had no interest in pursuing the musical profession because he would rather surf, which he agreed with, but she soon discovered that he plays piano very well. He told her that in order to keep surfing, he must pass his father's piano test every time his father comes home. He even took Hanabi to his home one day where she met his stern father and playboy brothers in order to get them to approve of their relationship. Yasuaki lives alone most of the time, just like Hanabi. He would often cook dinner for Hanabi and himself, since Hanabi usually eats junk. In junior high school, he used to go to an all-boys school, which followed through the beginning of his high school years. As a student council member, most popular boy in the school, and good at surfing among other things, he's basically an ideal boyfriend. He still sees chicks instead of girls, with the exception of Hanabi, who he saw as a game fowl. However, soon enough, Yasuaki and Hanabi start to date. He becomes very serious about Hanabi, even hinting at marriage. He also picked up some techniques and lines from his older brothers, using them on Hanabi. But it isn't long before he meets Takeru Suno, a childhood friend of Hanabi but the two's closeness causes Yasuaki to go into a fit of jealousy, and pick a fight with him. Even though he got severely beaten up in the fight with Takeru, Hanabi still chose Yasuaki and after other mishaps and misunderstandings they begin to get closer, and in book five they even get intimate. This cures him of his "girl allergy" and allows him to see girls instead of chicks. Hanabi shares that perhaps she likes Yasuaki because he is sweet when she least expects it.
Yoshitomo Kuon (久遠 良知, Kuon Yoshitomo)
The student council president. He and his parents own a flower shop. He is Yasuaki's best friend and a very scary guy if angered. He took off Yasuaki and Hanabi's clothes when they ditched school to play video games and put them in the same bed. An arrogant student (Kiyozumi) dated many female students and sold their e-mail addresses to other male students. He almost got Hanabi and Yasuaki expelled for fighting him and told Yoshitomo that the student council was going down in value. Yoshitomo asked Kiyozumi if he was questioning his choice in student council members and by some mysterious circumstances, he made this student transfer to another school. He also may have sparked Yasuaki's fear of women. When Yasuaki was five years old, he used to be 'everyone's Yasu', but it was Yoshitomo who told the girls that he could only marry one girl, making them all fight over Yasuaki. He later tells Hanabi that perhaps this is for the better, so he did not end up like a player in the end. He also teases Yasuaki a lot, by pretending to like Hanabi when Yasuaki admitted his feelings for her, and also kissed Hanabi more than once, one time fully on the lips. He kissed her on the mouth to prove the point that no love is without doubt and sadness. He also drew 'Hanako the toilet ghost' in the girls bathroom stalls to scare Hanabi while she was studying for finals. Yoshitomo was called 'puzzling' by his fellow student council members and 'heartless' by Hanabi. Yoshitomo has called Hanabi 'weird' to Yasuaki.
Tokihisa Aido (会童 時久, Aidō Tokihisa)
A student council member who bullies other students. Tokihisa considers Yasuaki his rival because Yasuaki is better than him at everything, especially sports. He soon falls in love with Hanabi, attracted by her fiery spirit. He was openly affectionate with Hanabi, hugging her in public many times, and was the first to confess to her. He devised the tennis match between Hanabi and Yasuaki so that he can join Hanabi's team and defeat Yasuaki, becoming her 'champion'. He also set up a situation so that he could protect Hanabi from flying shot put balls, but landed up in the hospital instead. During this time Yasuaki and Hanabi got together, and Hanabi visited him in the hospital to tell him what happened. He agreed to become friends with her instead. He did not give up easily though, as he turned off the lights in the student council room with an aim to kiss Hanabi. When Yoshitomo switched the lights on, he was kissing Yasuaki instead. He still offers to protect Hanabi, especially when she's in a fight with Yasuaki. Hanabi mentioned that Tokihisa matched with her in terms of will and spirit. If you look in Wild Act, also by Rie Takada, Ryu Eba is chatting with a guy who looks suspiciously like Tokihisa.
Takeru Suno
Hanabi's short fused and pushy yet sweet childhood friend. They were friends since birth and next door neighbors. He claimed to have practically raised Hanabi. He trained Hanabi to be strong. Ultimately making her who she is now. He moved to Denmark when Hanabi began elementary school because of his father's work, but promised to return when she became really strong. Ten years later, he returned to Japan to fulfill his promise. He came for a short period of time to look for houses in the area. He told Hanabi to break up with her boyfriend to be with him. He took Hanabi to a love hotel to 'make her a woman', but they didn't go in. However, they were spotted by Hanabi's schoolmates who misunderstood the situation and spread the gossip around school. Yasuaki squashed that rumor immediately by saying that Hanabi was just showing an old friend around town. Yasuaki was still jealous though, and spoke harshly to Hanabi, assuming that she and Takeru were together. She got upset and proclaimed that she chose Takeru, not wanting to hear any more of Yasuaki's mean words. Hanabi was going to tell Takeru her decision when she found that Takeru and Yasuaki got into a fight. She immediately ran to Yasuaki and realized who she really chose. Yasuaki admitted to being jealous of Takeru and mentioned that the two acted and talked in the same way. Takeru told Hanabi to meet him at the airport to answer his confession, but she called him instead and told him she chose Yasuaki. He told Hanabi that if you just try something, you may actually have fun. Takeru returned later, with no signs of backing down. He took Yasuaki and Hanabi to pick up Hanabi's father at the airport. Hanabi's father got bad first impressions of Yasuaki and said that he preferred Takeru. He even called Takeru and Hanabi 'Takebi'. It turned out that he was only testing Yasuaki and Yasuaki passed his test, giving his approval for the relationship. Hanabi finally stood up to Takeru when he offered to pick her up and take her home but she declined, spending the night with Yasuaki instead.
Tsubasa Tamaya
A handsome celebrity whose love songs make him highly popular with the teenaged set. Hanabi accidentally cut Yasuaki's hair strangely, resulting in him wearing a cap that was similar to Tsubasa's. Fangirls mistook Yasuako for Tsubasa, chasing him off, leaving Hanabi trampled and Tsubasa going up to her to apologize for the commotion. He told her not to tell anyone that he saved her. She smacked him, saying that he didn't save her, and that he should have been a man and shown his face to keep Yasuaki from being chased. He found her different from the other girls, asking her to hang out with him for a day. He wanted Hanabi to show him a famous spot in town where he could hang a padlock to be linked to his actress girlfriend forever. They were caught by paparazzi who asked if Hanabi and Tsubasa were together, but Yasuaki ran in front of the cameras and declared that Hanabi was his girlfriend. Tsubasa told Hanabi that her boyfriend was pretty cool. Gossip papers later made up a love triangle between Hanabi, Tsubasa, and Yasuaki.
Kaoru Shirayuri
She is a student advisor who is only easy on pretty boys. She saved Hanabi from getting suspended for criticizing the school principal over the public address system, but made it so that Hanabi would have to rank first on the final exams or else would be kicked out of the student council. Mad that the student council ikemen were helping her study, she tried to steal Hanabi's study notes but was intercepted by the three male student council members instead. They promised to launch an investigation on complaints some male students had against her and despite her attempts to ruin Hanabi, she still managed to score first place on final exams.

== Reception ==
Jason Thompson wrote for Manga: The Complete Guide that is similar to an American teen film and "is a sweet, slapstick series with a great heroine ... The plot is fast-paced, the characters are extroverted, and the art is pleasantly cartoony".
