= Jingi Naki Mukotori =

Japanese manga series

- First tankōbon volume cover

仁義なき婿取り
- Genre: Action; Romance
- Manga
- Written by: Airi Sano
- Published by: Shogakukan
- Imprint: Flower Comics
- Magazine: Sho-Comi
- Original run: January 4, 2020 – December 20, 2023
- Volumes: 16

Jingi Naki Mukotori (仁義なき婿取り) is a Japanese manga series written and illustrated by Airi Sano. It was serialized in Shogakukan's shōjo manga magazine Sho-Comi from January 2020 to December 2023, with its chapters collected into sixteen volumes.

== Synopsis ==
Ageha is born into the family of top Yakuza in Japan, and is expected to marry one. However, Ageha disapproves of Yakuza, and finds solace in a cat café employee named Kira. Unbeknownst to her, Kira is secretly a Yakuza.

== Characters ==
Ageha (愛夏羽)
Voiced by: Sumire Uesaka (voice comic)
Kira (紀羅)
Voiced by: Daiki Yamashita (voice comic)
Yamato (大和)
Voiced by: Shōya Ishige (voice comic)

== Media ==
=== Manga ===
Written and illustrated by Airi Sano, Jingi Naki Mukotori was serialized in Shogakukan's shōjo manga magazine Sho-Comi from January 4, 2020, to December 20, 2023. Its chapters were collected into sixteen tankōbon volumes released from July 27, 2020, to July 25, 2024.

No.	Release date	ISBN
1	July 27, 2020	978-4-09-871130-7
2	September 25, 2020	978-4-09-871140-6
3	December 25, 2020	978-4-09-871221-2
4	March 26, 2021	978-4-09-871328-8
5	July 25, 2021	978-4-09-871336-3
6	October 26, 2021	978-4-09-871538-1
7	December 24, 2021	978-4-09-871548-0
8	March 25, 2022	978-4-09-871615-9
9	July 24, 2022	978-4-09-871679-1
10	October 26, 2022	978-4-09-871825-2
11	December 26, 2022	978-4-09-871830-6
12	April 26, 2023	978-4-09-872066-8
13	August 25, 2023	978-4-09-872197-9
14	November 24, 2023	978-4-09-872389-8
15	February 26, 2024	978-4-09-872468-0
16	July 25, 2024	978-4-09-872589-2

=== Other ===
A six-episode voice comic was included in the 14th issue of the Sho-Comi magazine released on June 20, 2022. It consisted of performances by Sumire Uesaka, Daiki Yamashita, and Shōya Ishige, and episodes 1 and 2 are available on the Flower Comics YouTube channel. Another voice comic was included in the 12th issue of the same magazine released on May 19, 2023. It featured Uesaka and Yamashita returning from the previous voice comics, and Haruo Satō.

== Reception ==
By July 2024, the series had over 1.3 million copies in circulation.
