= Suki Desu Suzuki-kun!! =

Japanese manga series

好きです鈴木くん!!
- Genre: Romantic comedy
- Manga
- Written by: Gō Ikeyamada
- Published by: Shogakukan
- Magazine: Sho-Comi
- Original run: October 20, 2008 – September 26, 2012
- Volumes: 18
- Original video animation
- Released: December 18, 2009 – July 26, 2010
- Runtime: 12 minutes (episode 1); 17 minutes (episode 2)
- Episodes: 2

Suki Desu Suzuki-kun!! (好きです鈴木くん!!; lit. 'I Like You, Suzuki-kun!!'), alternatively known as The Lovin' "S", is a Japanese manga series written and illustrated by Gō Ikeyamada. It began its serialization in October 2008 in the magazine Sho-Comi and ended in June 2012. The chapters are collected and bound in tankōbon format by Shogakukan under the Flower Comics label. The story is separated into two arcs, the first arc focusing on the main characters during their middle school years and the latter half when all of them are 17 years old. An original video animation for the series was released in late 2009, along with a game for the Nintendo DS in the summer of 2010.

== Plot ==
At age 13, four classmates have just started junior high school: Sayaka, Hikaru, Chihiro, and Shinobu. While Sayaka and Hikaru instantly develop an attraction towards each other, Chihiro, Hikaru's childhood friend, secretly pines for him while the spoiled Shinobu (who shares the same last name as Hikaru but with no relation to him) falls in love with Chihiro. Throughout their junior high years, the four sort out their feelings.

During their second year of junior high, at the age of 15, all of them break off relations with their love. However, when they are all reunited at the age of 17, during their second year of high school, everything has changed, and they cannot go back to what they used to be.

After experiencing much sadness, they all finally become two couples, and in the end, there is a story where they get married.

== Characters ==
=== Main characters ===
Sayaka Hoshino (星野 爽歌, Hoshino Sayaka)
Voiced by: Azumi Asakura (OVA), Juri Takita (game)
Sayaka is one of the main protagonists who is a shy, unconfident 13-year-old girl who secretly has a passion for acting, garnered from reenacting scenes from television dramas. Her prodigious acting was recognized by Hikaru, and with his encouragement, she joined the drama club. Sayaka is then labeled as a prodigy actress by her teacher and continues to hold leading roles in school plays. At home, her interest in acting is ignored by her family and her parents are constantly away due to work.
Sayaka falls in love with Hikaru and accidentally confesses to him during a school play. The two begin dating and were originally going to attend the same high school together, but due to her father's work, she had to move away to Kyūshū during the summer. Sayaka never contacts Hikaru afterwards despite her promises. Unexpectedly, she moves back to Tokyo at the age of 17, now a famous actress by the name of Sayaka Naruse (成瀬 爽歌, Naruse Sayaka), and enrolls at Hikaru's high school. However, she doesn't remember anything from before two years ago, including Hikaru, due to the shock of her parents dying shortly after her move. After recovering her memories, Sayaka tries to hide the truth from Hikaru and bids farewell to him, as she can't forgive herself for hurting Hikaru. During the tournament, Sayaka runs to the gym, confessing the truth and confirms her feelings to him. They finally unite after two years of separation. At the age of 18, they promise that they will get married after they achieve their dreams. By age 23, she becomes a famous actress. She becomes pregnant with Hikaru's child and gives birth to fraternal twins, a girl named Mao and a boy named Nao, both named after her parents. Half a year after the birth of the twins, Sayaka and Hikaru get married.
Hikaru Suzuki (鈴木 輝, Suzuki Hikaru)
Voiced by: Hirofumi Oda (OVA), Kōki Miyata (game) (Japanese)
Hikaru is a cheerful, considerate 13-year-old boy from an average family and dreams of becoming a professional basketball player. Originally, he played baseball, but because his childhood friend, Chihiro, received an injury that wouldn't let her play basketball anymore, he decided to make that dream come true for her by learning basketball from her and becoming a professional in her place.
On the first day of junior high school, Hikaru defends Sayaka from Shinobu and becomes captivated by her talent in acting, encouraging her to become more confident. He falls in love with her, and she reciprocated his feelings. They started dating and planned to attend the same high school together. However, they were forced to part, and after she moved away, he never saw her again until they were 17. Despite the fact that Sayaka remembers nothing about him, he is patient and determined to wait for her to recover her memories. During the basketball tournament, Hikaru finds out that Sayaka has already remembered everything and is overjoyed to be able to resume his relationship with her after two years of separation. He proposes to her at age 18, but he will marry her after they achieve their dreams. By age 23, he becomes a basketball champion and making it all the way to the ACE. He later finds out that Sayaka is pregnant with his child and they decide to live together for the first time. Sayaka gives birth to fraternal twins, a boy and girl. Hikaru names the boy "Nao" and the girl "Mao", after Sayaka's late parents. Half a year after the children are born, Hikaru marries Sayaka.
Chihiro Itō (伊藤 ちひろ, Itō Chihiro)
Voiced by: Mayu Isshiki (OVA), Ayana Taketatsu (game)
Chihiro is one of the main protagonists who is Hikaru's childhood friend and has had romantic feelings for him since they were little, although she knows he is in love with Sayaka; therefore, she tries to conceal her feelings towards Hikaru and supports him with his love instead. She is mature compared to the rest of her classmates and is also strong-willed; in addition, she is popular for her beauty. Chihiro is also hinted as being smart and good at fighting as well. Throughout the story, she is always described as selfless and kind. Although Chihiro is observant and sharp, she is slow at her own matters and didn't realize Shinobu's feelings for her at first. Chihiro is the manager of the basketball team, but her interest in the sport dates to before that — she used to play basketball and wanted to become a professional until she was injured during a competition that prevented her from pursuing her dream.
Although Chihiro loves Hikaru, she begins to develop feelings for Shinobu as well. She was originally going to attend Kaijō High School with Shinobu, but after observing Hikaru's pent-up suffering without Sayaka, she decided to stay with him instead. To this day, she continues to blame herself for hurting Shinobu deeply. When Sayaka re-enters their lives, Chihiro gives up on her love with Hikaru after he rejects her confession. After several incidents involving her reunion with Shinobu, Chihiro finally realizes that she has unconsciously fallen in love with Shinobu and only notices that now. After the tournament, Chihiro chases after Shinobu, takes the initiative and kisses him, saying that she loves him and promises to love him one hundred times more than he loves her. She swears to herself that she'll spend the rest of her life making him happy. They finally officially go out with each other after two years of one-side love and separation. By age 23, she becomes a middle school teacher and marries Shinobu. A year later, she gives birth to a son named Hiromu.
Shinobu Suzuki (鈴木 忍, Suzuki Shinobu)
Voiced by: Ryō Iwasaki (OVA), Takashi Kondou (game)
Shinobu may have the same family name as Hikaru, but they have no relation; in fact, both dislike the other. Shinobu hails from a wealthy family and is a genius in sports and also good at studies. He is very popular with the girls, but simultaneously spoiled, arrogant and selfish. Despite his contempt towards her during their first encounter, Shinobu quickly falls for Chihiro, although he knows she is hopelessly attached to Hikaru. Shinobu is also the first person to ever realize Chihiro's feelings for Hikaru and is often described as the person who understands Chihiro most. Bearing the pain, he continues to pursue her in hopes of helping her move on from him. After hearing Hikaru's sacrifice for Chihiro, he decided to become a professional basketball player for her sake as well.
During their last year of junior high school, Shinobu decides to attend Kaijō High School and invites Chihiro to apply with him. However, Chihiro's decision to stay with Hikaru hurts him emotionally; thus he swears to himself that he'll never fall in love again. At age 17, Shinobu remains just as popular with the girls as ever, but has become a playboy. He still has not forgiven Chihiro for betraying him, although he still holds feelings for her. After several incidents involving Shinobu and Chihiro's reunion, Shinobu finally resigns himself to the fact that his love for her still remains, and confesses his feelings to her again, claiming that his love for her has surpassed any hatred and that no matter how many times she hurts him, he will still love only her. His feelings are eventually returned after the basketball tournament. They finally officially get together after two years of one-sided love and separation. By age 23, he becomes the new president of his father's company and marries Chihiro. A year later, they become the parents of a son named Hiromu.

=== Secondary characters ===
Erika Aoi (葵 エリカ, Aoi Erika)
Erika is a famous actress and is also a prodigy in acting. She develops an unreciprocated crush on Hikaru. She eventually gives up on him once she comes to understand his and Sakaya's feelings. In the final chapter, she has a daughter named Sakura.
Haruka Aoi (葵 ハルカ, Aoi Haruka)
Haruka is Erika's little brother and becomes a freshman at Hikaru and Chihiro's high school. He is often mistaken as a girl due to his androgynous good looks and falls in love with Chihiro, as she is the first person to tell that he is, in fact, a male. He joins the basketball club only because she is the manager of the team. Haruka feels threatened by Shinobu's presence since he used to date Chihiro and dislikes him for the way he presently treats her. Haruka reminds Hikaru of Shinobu, since he was like him when Shinobu was in middle school.
Takumi Shirota (城田 巧, Shirota Takumi)
Takumi is Sayaka's boyfriend and helped her through her shock when her parents died. He is determined to keep her from remembering the events from before two years ago to protect her mental stability and wants her to make as less contact with Hikaru as possible. However, he gives up on her once she regains her memories of Hikaru and returns to him.

== Media ==
=== Manga ===
Suki Desu Suzuki-kun!! ran in the monthly manga magazine Shōjo Comic since October 20, 2008, and ended on September 26, 2012. The chapters are collected and published by Shogakukan into tankōbon under the Flower Comics imprint. There are eighteen bound volumes in total, with the first volume released on December 24, 2008.

No.	Japanese release date	Japanese ISBN
01	December 24, 2008	978-4-09-132197-8
02	March 26, 2009	978-4-09-132308-8
03	June 26, 2009	978-4-09-132425-2
04	August 26, 2009	978-4-09-132598-3
05	October 26, 2009	978-4-09-132787-1
06	December 24, 2009	978-4-09-132800-7
07	March 26, 2010	978-4-09-133044-4
08	July 26, 2010	978-4-09-133330-8
09	October 26, 2010	978-4-09-133516-6
10	December 24, 2010	978-4-09-133543-2
11	March 25, 2011	978-4-09-133686-6
12	July 26, 2011	978-4-09-134041-2
13	October 26, 2011	978-4-09-134129-7
14	December 26, 2011	978-4-09-134155-6
15	March 26, 2012	978-4-09-134290-4
16	June 26, 2012	978-4-09-134528-8
17	July 26, 2012	978-4-09-134626-1
18	September 26, 2012	978-4-09-134638-4

=== Anime ===
An original video animation for Suki Desu Suzuki-kun!! was released on December 18, 2009, directly onto DVD along with 2010's first issue of Sho-Comi. The OVA is an animated re-enactment of the first chapter of the manga. A second episode was also released on DVD and was distributed with the Suzuki-kun!! fanbook released on July 26, 2010. It is a re-enactment of chapters 15 and 16 of the manga.

=== Light Novel ===
A light novel titled Suki Desu Suzuki-kun!! Pure White Love (好きです鈴木くん!!―ピュア・ホワイト・ラブ―, Suki Desu Suzuki-kun!! Pyua Howaito Rabu) was written by Yui Tokiumi and was overseen and illustrated by Ikeyamada. The story revolves around Hikaru and Sayaka's relationship during their third year in junior high. It was released on December 24, 2009.

A second light novel again written by Tokuimi, titled Suki Desu Suzuki-kun!! With Precious Heart (好きです鈴木くん!!―ウィズ・プレシャス・ハート―, Suki Desu Suzuki-kun!! Uizu Pureshasu Hāto), was released on July 26, 2010. The story takes place between volumes 7 and 8 of the manga (before the high school arc and after the characters' third year in middle school).

=== Game ===
Idea Factory released a game for Nintendo DS, titled Suki Desu Suzuki-kun!! ~Yo-nin no Suzuki-kun~ (好きです鈴木くん！！～4人の鈴木くん～, Suki Desu Suzuki-kun!! ~Yo-nin no Suzuki-kun~) on July 29, 2010. The game takes place during the summer of the characters' first year in middle school. Alongside the main cast, two new characters designed by Ikeyamada herself were introduced with the last name "Suzuki" as well: Michiru Suzuki (鈴木 みちる, Suzuki Michiru) (voiced by Sōichirō Hoshi) and Hiroto Suzuki (鈴木 大翔, Suzuki Hiroto) (voiced by Yuichi Nakamura). The game uses an entirely different voice cast as opposed to the one used for the OVA. The limited edition of the game comes with a drama CD featuring the main four characters, using the same voice cast for the game.

== Reception ==
Suki Desu Suzuki-kun!! is one of the best-selling shōjo manga in Japan. The second volume sold 53,139 copies in the first week of its release and 84,946 in total. The third volume declined in sales with 43,341 copies selling on its first week and 79,865 in total, but was followed by the fourth volume debuting at #9 on the Tohan Comics Charts with 64,362 copies selling in its first week and 89,945 in total. The fifth volume debuted at #6 with 77,911 copies selling on its first week. The sixth volume sold 58,972 copies on its first week and 111,701 copies in total. The seventh volume sold 62,783 copies on its first week and 117,021 in total. The eighth volume topped the Oricon Comics Chart in the first week of sales, selling 113,202 copies weekly and 113,710 in total. It was the 35th best-selling manga series in Japan in 2011, with 1,264,317 copies. It sold 1,607,178 copies between November 21, 2011, and November 18, 2012.

The manga was ranked one of the top 10 shōjo manga "with heart-wrenching scenes" in the July 2010 issue of Junon by its readers.
