= Hachimitsu ni Hatsukoi =

Japanese manga series

ハチミツにはつこい
- Manga
- Written by: Ai Minase
- Published by: Shogakukan
- Magazine: Sho-Comi
- Original run: October 2012 – July 2015
- Volumes: 12

Hachimitsu ni Hatsukoi (ハチミツにはつこい; lit. 'First Love Like Honey') is a Japanese manga series written and illustrated by Ai Minase and serialized on Shogakukan's Shōjo Comic magazine. 12 volumes were published. It is published in France by Panini.

== Characters ==
- Koharu Shiina
- Natsuki Sugiura
- Aki Saionji

== Volumes ==
- 1 (November 26, 2012)
- 2 (December 26, 2012)
- 3 (March 26, 2013)
- 4 (June 26, 2013)
- 5 (September 26, 2013)
- 6 (January 24, 2014)
- 7 (March 26, 2014)
- 8 (July 25, 2014)
- 9 (September 26, 2014)
- 10 (December 26, 2014)
- 11 (March 26, 2015)
- 12 (August 26, 2015)

== Reception ==
Volume 1 reached the 35th place on the weekly Oricon manga chart and, as of December 2, 2012, has sold 25,522 copies; volume 2 reached the 41st place and, as of December 30, 2012, has sold 27,923 copies; volume 5 reached the 16th place and, as of October 6, 2013, has sold 71,993 copies; volume 6 reached the 11th place and, as of February 2, 2014, has sold 76,972 copies; volume 7 reached the 12th place and, as of April 6, 2014, has sold 92,459 copies; volume 8 reached the 20th place and, as of August 3, 2014, has sold 76,089 copies; volume 9 reached the 26th place and, as of October 5, 2014, has sold 73,490 copies; volume 11 reached the 17th place and, as of April 5, 2015, had sold 81,481 copies.

The staff at Manga News gave the French edition a grade of 16 out of 20. On Manga Sanctuary, one of the staff members gave it a grade of 5 out of 10.
