= Magical Girl Dandelion =

Japanese manga series

- First tankōbon volume cover

魔法少女ダンデライオン (Mahō Shōjo Danderaion)
- Genre: Dark fantasy; Magical girl
- Manga
- Written by: Kaeru Mizuho
- Published by: Shogakukan
- English publisher: NA: Viz Media
- Imprint: Flower Comics
- Magazine: Sho-Comi
- Original run: August 20, 2024 – present
- Volumes: 5

Magical Girl Dandelion (Japanese: 魔法少女ダンデライオン, Hepburn: Mahō Shōjo Danderaion) is a Japanese manga series written and illustrated by Kaeru Mizuho. It began serialization in Shogakukan's shōjo manga magazine Sho-Comi in August 2024.

== Synopsis ==
As she enjoys her high school life, Tanpopo Ohanami has been offered the once-in-a-lifetime opportunity to become a magical girl to take down monsters named Fiends. However, Tanpopo has a secret that she can't disclose. The secret is she made friends with a Fiend named Shade in her childhood. When Shade finds out that Tanpopo has become a magical girl, he is not happy with the decision, but reluctantly works together with Tanpopo to take down Fiends.

== Publication ==
Written and illustrated by Kaeru Mizuho, Magical Girl Dandelion began serialization in Shogakukan's shōjo manga magazine Sho-Comi on August 20, 2024. Its chapters have been compiled into five tankōbon volumes as of August 2026.

The series' chapters are simultaneously published in English on Viz Media's Viz Manga app. In June 2025, Viz Media announced that they would begin releasing volumes of the series in Q2 2026.

No.	Original release date	Original ISBN	English release date	English ISBN
1	April 25, 2025	978-4-09-873111-4	March 3, 2026	978-1-9747-5779-4
Chapters 1–4
2	July 25, 2025	978-4-09-873174-9	June 2, 2026	978-1-9747-1661-6
Chapters 5–8
3	November 26, 2025	978-4-09-873259-3	September 1, 2026	978-1-9747-6665-9
Chapters 9–12
4	March 26, 2026	978-4-09-873296-8	February 2, 2027	978-1-9747-7165-3
Chapters 13-16
5	August 26, 2026	978-4-09-873472-6	—	—
Chapters 17-20
6	November 26, 2026	978-4-09-873573-0	—	—

== Reception ==
The series was nominated for the eleventh Next Manga Awards in 2025 in the print category. It was also nominated for the award in 2026.

The second volume featured a recommendation from manga creator Kazuhiro Fujita.
