= Gaba Kawa =

Japanese manga

- Cover of the original Japanese release

ガバ·カワ
- Genre: Adventure, comedy, romance
- Manga
- Written by: Rie Takada
- Published by: Shogakukan
- English publisher: NA: Viz Media
- Magazine: Shōjo Comic
- English magazine: NA: Shojo Beat
- Original run: July 2007 – November 2007
- Volumes: 1

Gaba Kawa (ガバ·カワ) is a Japanese manga by Rie Takada, originally serialized in Japan from July to November 2007 by Shogakukan in Shōjo Comic and collected in a single bound volume. It tells the story of a demon girl named Rara who comes to the human world to cause mischief, only to find herself falling in love with a human boy. To help him, she uses her demon powers, but doing so causes her to immediately lose them.

It has been licensed for an English language release in North America by Viz Media. It first premiered in Viz's monthly manga anthology Shojo Beat in the April 2008 issue. The single volume was released on 2 December 2008, after it completed its run in the magazine.

== Plot ==
Young demons Rara Yamabuki and Bibi Kurosawa come to the human world in order to do evil deeds and become full-fledged demons. Rivals in love, they search for the legendary demon, Hiroshi Akusawa, in order to win his heart though they do not even know what he looks like. While Rara is standing on the roof, classmate Retsu Aku mistakenly believes she is going to kill herself and grabs her, "flying" down with her to safety. With that, and hearing him called "Aku," Rara believes him to be Akusawa, but later learns he is just a normal human and that Akusawa is not nearly as desirable in person. When she uses her power of flight to aid Retsu, causing her to lose the power forever, Rara realizes she has fallen in love with him.

As the series progresses, Rara learns that Retsu has had the power to see ghosts since the previous summer. One ghost begins stalking Retsu to take over his body. Rara tries to protect Retsu, using her power of invisibility, but in doing so accidentally kisses him. After Retsu learns about the ghost, he is able to identify the ghost and remind him of his past, allowing the ghost to move on to the afterlife. Rara, however, has lost so many of her powers helping Retsu that her mother and other demons warn her that if she does not kill Retsu, she will soon disappear "into the darkness." Rara is unable to do it after Retsu confesses his own love for her. They skip school to spend the day together, and Rara decides she will enjoy whatever time she has left with him. Bibi, unwilling to let her "rival" disappear, traps Rara, then disguised as Rara tries to kill Retsu herself. Retsu sees through her and Rara is able to catch up to them in time to warn him that Bibi wants to kill him. Before leaving them alone again, Bibi explains to Retsu about their being demons and that Rara is going to disappear because of her love for him.

Retsu tells Rara to kill him so she can live, but she refuses. She kisses him, using the last of her powers to take away his ability to see ghosts, then disappears. Instead of going into darkness, she begins going to the light. Retsu promises to find her wherever she ends up, and tells her not to forget him. Later, Retsu is shown having forgotten what happened, though left with a feeling he is missing someone. Bibi uses her own powers to walk by him disguised as Rara and whispers "don't forget me", unlocking his memories.

In a hospital, a girl named Sara wakes up from a six-month-long coma, after having been stabbed in a street fight with a guy. Beside her is Retsu, who tells her that he is her boyfriend. A delinquent, she threatens to kill him, but he hugs her and says she cannot, and that he knows the real her.

== Title meaning ==
The manga's title Gaba Kawa is a combination of the Japanese words ganbaru, meaning to persist, and kawaii, meaning cute. It refers to someone who is so persistent, it is cute.

== Reception ==
Gaba Kawa has been praised for Takada's clear art, flair for comedy, and likeable characters. Takada was criticized for her confusing action scenes and the story's abrupt ending.
