= Seishun Heavy Rotation =

Japanese manga series

- First tankōbon volume cover

青春ヘビーローテーション (Seishun Hebī Rōtēshon)
- Manga
- Written by: Ai Minase
- Published by: Shogakukan
- Imprint: Flower Comics
- Magazine: Sho-Comi
- Original run: February 5, 2020 – present
- Volumes: 20

Seishun Heavy Rotation (Japanese: 青春ヘビーローテーション, Hepburn: Seishun Hebī Rōtēshon; lit. 'The Springtime of My Life') is a Japanese manga series written and illustrated by Ai Minase. It began serialization in Shogakukan's Sho-Comi manga magazine in February 2020.

== Synopsis ==
Nao Kosaka falls in love at first sight with a boy who helped her calm down during her high school entrance exams. After passing said exams, she later becomes classmates with the same boy who is named Keiji Haruna. Haruna is a young man who claims to hate girls who are attracted to him, but grows fond of teasing Nao.

== Characters ==
Nao Kosaka (小坂奈緒, Kosaka Nao)
Voiced by: Nao Tōyama (voice comic)
Keiji Haruna (榛名圭司, Haruna Keiji)
Voiced by: Ryōhei Kimura (voice comic)
Mizuno-senpai (水野先輩)
Voiced by: Takahiro Sakurai (voice comic)
Tsugumi Furusawa (古沢つぐみ, Furusawa Tsugumi)
Voiced by: Mariko Honda (voice comic)

== Publication ==
Written and illustrated by Ai Minase, Seishun Heavy Rotation began serialization in Shogakukan's Sho-Comi manga magazine on February 5, 2020. The series went on hiatus on February 10, 2023, and resumed serialization on June 20, 2023. The series' chapters have been compiled into twenty tankōbon volumes as of August 2026.

=== Volumes ===
No.	Release date	ISBN
1	July 27, 2020	978-4-09-871129-1
2	July 27, 2020	978-4-09-871131-4
3	September 25, 2020	978-4-09-871184-0
4	December 25, 2020	978-4-09-871222-9
5	April 26, 2021	978-4-09-871331-8
6	July 26, 2021	978-4-09-871444-5
7	October 26, 2021	978-4-09-871540-4
8	January 26, 2022	978-4-09-871612-8
9	April 26, 2022	978-4-09-871677-7
10	July 26, 2022	978-4-09-871735-4
11	November 25, 2022	978-4-09-871826-9
12	September 26, 2023	978-4-09-872064-4
13	February 26, 2024	978-4-09-872467-3
14	June 26, 2024	978-4-09-872632-5
15	October 24, 2024	978-4-09-872777-3
16	March 26, 2025	978-4-09-873004-9
17	July 25, 2025	978-4-09-873138-1
18	November 26, 2025	978-4-09-873258-6
19	March 26, 2026	978-4-09-873379-8
20	August 26, 2026	978-4-09-873466-5

== Reception ==
The series was nominated for the 67th and 68th Shogakukan Manga Award in the shōjo category in 2022 and 2023, respectively.
