= Kyō, Koi o Hajimemasu =

Media franchise

- Cover of Kyō, Koi o Hajimemasu first volume as published by Shogakukan

今日、恋をはじめます
- Genre: Slice of life, Romance
- Manga
- Written by: Kanan Minami
- Published by: Shogakukan
- Magazine: Shōjo Comic
- Original run: February 2007 – February 2014
- Volumes: 15
- Original video animation
- Directed by: Naoto Hosoda
- Produced by: Keiichi Yamakawa; Tomoya Negishi
- Written by: Shigeyasu Yamauchi
- Music by: Masaru Sugimoto
- Studio: J.C.Staff
- Released: 23 June 2010 – 23 October 2010
- Runtime: 20 minutes each
- Episodes: 2
- Live-action film
- Directed by: Takeshi Furusawa
- Licensed by: Viki
- Released: December 8, 2012

Kyō, Koi o Hajimemasu (Japanese: 今日、恋をはじめます; lit. "Today, Our Love Begins", also titled Love for Beginners internationally for the live-action film) is a Japanese shōjo manga series created by Kanan Minami. It started serialization in 2008 in the magazine Sho-Comi, and completed in 2013, with 15 bound volumes have been released in Japan under the Flower Comics label.

== Plot ==
Despite Tsubaki Hibino's talent in styling other people's hair, she isn't comfortable with doing the same for herself. On her first day of high school, she is immediately looked down upon her delinquent-like classmates for her old-fashioned taste. When she is teased by the top student, Kyouta Tsubaki, who shares the same name as her, she defiantly cuts his hair. Interested in her actions, Kyouta decides to make her his target.

Kyouta, who is not only a promiscuous playboy but also has control of the class, and makes Tsubaki need his help during class activities, although Tsubaki attempts to resist his advances. Gradually, the two begin to fall in love with each other until Tsubaki discovers that Kyouta cannot commit himself into a relationship due to his mother and a nurse he trusted. With both of them having their first experiences in love, troubles start to weigh and test their relationship.

== Characters ==
Tsubaki Hibino (日比野 つばき, Hibino Tsubaki)
Voiced by: Rina Satō (drama CD), Kanae Itō (OVA)
Portrayed by: Emi Takei
Tsubaki is a high school student who has no specific goal other than to excel in high school and get into a university just to make her mother proud. She enjoys styling her sister Sakura's hair, but she tends to put her own hair in braids. She suffers from a low self-esteem and is not confident about dressing fashionably. Because of this, she is often teased at school for being old-fashioned. Kyouta makes her his next target, and although she resists his teasing, she begins to fall in love with him. Kyouta initially rejects her after her first confession, but he grows to accept her, and they begin dating officially in chapter 16. While their relationship is rocky and they get into countless misunderstandings, they only get closer and become more committed to each other. She even changes her old-fashioned appearance just for him. Initially confused on what to do with her life, she decides to become a hair stylist. In the final chapter, she is married to Kyouta and 3 months pregnant with their child.
Kyouta Tsubaki (椿 京太, Tsubaki Kyōta)
Voiced by: Takashi Kondō (drama CD), Daisuke Namikawa (OVA)
Portrayed by: Tori Matsuzaka
Kyouta is the top student in his class and dreams of becoming an astronaut. His father is a middle school teacher, and his mother walked out on the family when he was ten. He despises his mother for abandoning him with his abusive father. He used to have long hair, but Tsubaki cut it off in the first chapter while he was bullying her. He is well known around the school for being a huge playboy. At first, Tsubaki is one of his targets to solely play with, but he grows to like her more. Although he slowly falls in love with her, he is afraid of committing himself to her due to both his mother and a nurse he was close to betraying him. As their relationship grows, he gradually heals emotionally and is able to commit himself to her. Kyouta is very protective of Tsubaki and would do anything for her. In the final chapter, he is married to Tsubaki and they are expecting their first child. He plans on naming the child Camellia Tsubaki, as the name 'Tsubaki' means Camellia in English.
Miho Ichikura (市倉 深歩, Ichikura Miho)
Voiced by: Mariya Ise (OVA)
Tsubaki's first friend at school. She first helps out Tsubaki when she is being bullied at school so she can look good in front of Kyouta, whom she has harbored a crush on since middle school. When Tsubaki starts dating Kyouta, they briefly go through a rough patch until she ends up saving her from almost being raped by two guys who Arisa called to "scare" Tsubaki. She manages to get over Kyouta after and become Tsubaki's true friend. She offers advice to Tsubaki on how to deal with her feelings for Kyouta.
Nishiki Hasegawa (長谷川 西希, Hasegawa Nishiki)
Portrayed by: Kento Yamazaki
Nishiki is a close friend of Kyouta and works with him at a karaoke place. He greatly respects Kyouta because he "owes him a lot." He instantly falls for Tsubaki's sister, Sakura, and dates her. Several years later, he marries her and they have a child.
Sakura Hibino (日比野 さくら, Hibino Sakura)
Voiced by: Sayuri Yahagi (OVA)
Portrayed by: Yua Shinkawa
Tsubaki's younger sister by one year, albeit more fashionable and outgoing. She meets Kyouta at Hibino's school festival and falls for him, but is rejected during a summer trip. She then begins dating Nishiki, Kyouta's best friend, and Tsubaki was shocked to discover that the two had even had sex. She is a huge supporter of Tsubaki's relationship with Kyouta, and often advises her on what to do. At the end of the series, Sakura marries Nishiki and they have a child.
Mao Halstead (ハルステッド 万央, Harusuteddo Mao)
Nicknamed "Haru", he is a half-Japanese boy and Kyouta's good friend from America. When they were in middle school, he began dating a girl named Rika, but then broke up after she was allegedly harassed by Kyouta. Because of this, he targets Tsubaki, as he had sworn to ruin any future love of Kyouta's. Eventually, Haru finds out Rika's deception after the school festival. He reconciles with Kyouta, and lets go of his feelings for Rika.

== Media ==
=== Manga ===
When creating the manga, Minami wanted to draw a romance between a "plain girl" and a "cool boy."

Kyō, Koi o Hajimemasu originally ran in Shōjo Comic since 2008 and completed in 2011, and 15 bound tankōbon have been released under the Flower Comics imprint. In addition, a special drama CD with a vocal reenactment of the first chapter was included in the June 2008 issue of Shōjo Comic and featured Rina Satō as Tsubaki and Takashi Kondō as Kyouta.

Kyō, Koi o Hajimemasu is licensed by Tokyopop Germany for regional German releases under the title 3, 2, 1... Liebe!.

=== Volumes ===
- Minami Mizunami "Today, I'm starting to fall in love" Shogakukan <Shocomi Flower Comics>, 15 volumes in total
  1. Released on January 25, 2008, ISBN 978-4-09-131540-3
  2. Released on April 25, 2008, ISBN 978-4-09-131590-8
  3. Released July 25, 2008, ISBN 978-4-09-131830-5
  4. Released October 24, 2008, ISBN 978-4-09-132107-7
  5. Released February 26, 2009, ISBN 978-4-09-132300-2
  6. Released June 26, 2009, ISBN 978-4-09-132424-5
  7. Released October 26, 2009, ISBN 978-4-09-132609-6
  8. Released February 26, 2010, ISBN 978-4-09-133034-5
  9. Released June 25, 2010, ISBN 978-4-09-133240-0
  10. Released October 26, 2010, ISBN 978-4-09-133514-2
  11. Released February 25, 2011,ISBN 978-4-09-133677-4
  12. Released June 24, 2011, ISBN 978-4-09-133847-1
  13. Released November 25, 2011, ISBN 978-4-09-134147-1
  14. Released February 24, 2012, ISBN 978-4-09-134284-3
  15. Released on May 25, 2012, ISBN 978-4-09-134520-2

=== Novel ===
Unless otherwise noted, the original work is by Minami Mizunami, and the author is Yuno Takase

- "Today, Love Begins: Prelude to First Love" Shogakukan〈FC Lululu novels), released on February 26, 2010, ISBN 978-4-09-133135-9
- "Today, I'm starting to fall in love. Fate is in your hands" Shogakukan〈FC Lululu novels, released on February 25, 2011, ISBN 978-4-09-133780-1
- "Today, Love Begins (Film Novelization)" Shogakukan <Shogakukan Bunko>, released on November 6, 2012, ISBN 978-4-09-408776-5

=== Anime ===
On 5 April 2010, Shojō Comic announced an original video animation production of Kyō, Koi o Hajimemasu, which was released directly onto DVD with the ninth volume of the manga on 25 June 2010. It was animated by J.C.Staff and directed by Shigeyasu Yamauchi. Following the first episode, a second episode was released on 25 February 2011 with French Kiss' "If" as the theme song.

=== Light novel ===
A light novel titled Kyō, Koi o Hajimemasu: Hatsukoi no Prelude (今日、恋をはじめます 初恋のプレリュード, Kyō, Koi o Hajimemasu: Hatsukoi no Preryūdo) was written by Yunoka Takase and was overseen and illustrated by Minami herself. The story details the events of Kyō, Koi o Hajimemasu through the perspective of Kyouta. It was released on 26 February 2010.

=== Drama ===
French Kiss, a sub-unit from the Japanese girl group AKB48, released an original live-action drama on 19 January 2011, that takes place a year prior to the storyline events of Kyō, Koi o Hajimemasu. The DVD was bundled with their second single, "If". A different version of the DVD, which features the members of French Kiss providing voiceovers to manga stills, came in a separate version of the "If" single.

=== Film ===
A live-action theatrical film for Kyō, Koi o Hajimemasu was announced in the December 2011 issue of Sho-Comi. The film starred Emi Takei as Tsubaki Hibino and Tori Matsuzaka as Kyouta Tsubaki. Filming was set to begin in early January 2012, with the film releasing on December 8, 2012.

== Reception ==
The first 14 volumes sold more than 8 million copies until March 2012.
