= Wild Act =

Japanese manga series

- Genre: Romantic comedy
- Manga
- Written by: Rie Takada
- Published by: Shogakukan
- English publisher: NA: Tokyopop
- Imprint: Flower Comics
- Magazine: Sho-Comi
- Original run: 1998 – 2000
- Volumes: 10

Wild Act is a ten-volume romantic comedy manga series, written and illustrated by Rie Takada, and was the first of her series to be translated in English. It was translated by Tokyopop, who opted not to renew the license once it expired.

== Plot ==
The story starts with a girl named Yuniko trying to steal an award because it was held by actor Akira Nanae. The actor who would receive it, Ryu Eba, finds out about her stealing it and tells her that she must steal it from him again. Then they start to fall in love. She continues to steal Akira's things, and she finds a tape of a conversation between her parents that states she has a brother named Ryu. They then travel to America and attend acting school in Los Angeles. She meets another Ryu, Ryu Gilliams. He says that his parents were Nanae's friends, and that they were told to marry. They star in the school play, and are successful. They find out Ryu Eba isn't her brother, and they end up as successful actors. At the end, Kamui and Cinnamon have babies, and Yuniko and Ryu have a baby as well. The last page ends in a cliffhanger, however, as they attend an award ceremony and it is never shown whether Ryu or Yuniko get the award.

== Characters ==
Yuniko Sakuraba
The main character of Wild Act. She is 15, and lives at the apartment block for the theater troupe that her parents were involved in, and has been raised by them since her father died, and her mother was put in the hospital. She is very upbeat and tends to be a little overconfident, though she shy's away from the stage. She starts out as a Nanae-maniac, cat burglarizing all of his stolen possessions for her own (Thus, how she meets Ryu Eba.) When she finds out that Nanae is her father, she immediately starts a search for proof. While she thinks that Ryu is her brother, she eventually realizes that she doesn't care.
Ryu Eba
The Hero of Wild Act. He is a 17 yr. old famous movie star in Japan and is often thought of as "The New Nanae" though he absolutely despises the comparison. When he falls in love with Yuniko, it is revealed that he is VERY possessive, and tends to be dirty-minded. He loves Yuniko, though all they ever seem to do is bicker. On a rare occasion, he is romantic and cares very deeply about what Yuniko feels. Regardless of the fact that he is a pervert, Ryu shows hints of being very mature for his age, even though he loses his temper more often. While Yuniko and Ryu think they are siblings, Ryu is the one who says they won't be having any more sex until they can prove they aren't. In the fight with Maki over the tape, he jumps after Yuniko when she falls from the cliff, and when Yuniko is trapped under the golden gate bridge, he rushes to the rescue with the help from both Tokio and Maki.
Tokio
Yuniko's friend who helps her steal Akira's things. He is a genius, though bit kinky, and often tries to get Yuniko to wear a leather bikini suit on her missions in return for a gadget he has created. He shows his true worth in the end of the manga when he and Maki help Ryu to save Yuniko from the psychopathic "Goldie."
Kamui
Yuniko's pet flying squirrel. He is Yuniko's partner in crime. He is found to be able to speak the human language. He also is the object of affection for Cinnamon, though he really doesn't like her, because he appointedly does not like children. He is very intelligent, and harbors a fantasy of romance with Yuniko. For this reason, he is jealous of Ryu.
Cinnamon
Yuniko's other pet flying squirrel. Cinnamon is too young to do anything, but she is in love with Kamui, although her love is not returned until the end of the last volume. She is very timid and pees all over, and when they get to America, her pee becomes explosive, like a barrier.
Maki
Yuniko's enemy turned friend in Japan. He is a former paparazzi. When Maki gives up his Aspiration to be a journalist, he falls in love with Yuniko. While she and Ryu are broken up(temporarily), he tries to comfort Yuniko by making love with her. He is unsuccessful.
Ryu Gilliams
Also known as Ryu #2. He is Yuniko's older brother, but due to an accidental baby swap when he was an infant, he has grown up all of his life as an orphan. Gilliams believes he is the son of Yuniko's parents friends and he also believes that he and Yuniko were destined to marry. When Yuniko turns him down, his true nature is revealed in which he attempts to kidnap, and possibly rape, her. Yuniko is saved by Tokio and Maki.
"Goldie"
She is a producer in Hollywood. She was in love with Akira when he was alive, and she blackmailed him into having sex with her so that she would put him in one of her movies. She tries the same trick with Ryu Eba, however, Ryu refuses. She believes Ryu Eba is her son, and she is so obsessed with Akira, that she drugs Ryu #1, and attempts to rape him. She also tries to kill Yuniko. In the last volume, it is revealed that Ryu Gilliams is Goldie's son.
Akira Nanae
Yuniko's late father. He was a very famous Actor, and the first Japanese person to make it big in Hollywood. While promoting one of his movies, he was involved in a plane crash that ultimately killed him. His belongings were scattered and ransacked by a bunch of fans upon his death.
