= Gō Ikeyamada =

Japanese manga artist

- Born: May 25; Sendai, Japan
- Occupation: Manga artist
- Writing career
- Period: 2002–present
- Genre: Fiction
- Subject: Shōjo manga

Gō Ikeyamada (池山田 剛, Ikeyamada Gō; born May 25) is a Japanese manga artist. She made her debut in 2002 with Get Love!!, which was serialized in Shōjo Comic.

== Bibliography ==
- (2003) Who is Afraid of Wolves!? (オオカミなんかコワくないっ!?, Ōkami Nanka Kowaikunai!?)

A one book finished.

- (2003) Get Love!! Field no Ōji-sama (GET LOVE!! 〜フィールドの王子さま〜)
- (2004) Moe Kare!! (萌えカレ!!, Moe Kare!)
- (2005) Who is Afraid of Valentine Day!? (ヴァレンタインなんかコワくないっ!?, Valentine Nanka Kowakunai!?)

Oneshot of "Ōkami Nanka Kowaikunai!?"

- (2006) Boy x Cinderella (少年xシンデレラ, Shōnen x Cinderella)
- Cuidado con la luna llena (Beware the Full Moon)
- (2006) The Rumoured Midori!! (うわさの翠くん!!, Uwasa no Midori-kun!!)
- (2007) Lovely Guardian (Raburī Banchō)
- (2008) I like you Suzuki-kun!! (好きです鈴木くん!!, Suki Desu Suzuki-kun!!)
- (2009) Megane ~Hazushite mo Ii Desu ka?~ (メガネ〜はずしてもいいですか？)

A compilation story with other 7 manga creators.

- (2011) Hōkago, Kimi to Koi o Shite (放課後、キミと恋をして。)

A compilation story with other 6 manga creators.

- (2012) So Cute it Hurts!! (小林が可愛すぎてツライっ!!, Kobayashi ga Kawai Sugite Tsurai!!)
- (2013) Chu Shichatta!?... Tomodachi to! (チューしちゃった！？…トモダチと！)

A compilation story with other 6 manga creators.

- (2016) Sekai wa Nakajima ni Koi o Suru!! (世界は中島に恋をする!!)
- (2017) Satou, Watashi o Sukitte Barechau yo (佐藤、私を好きってバレちゃうよ)
- (2018) Doukyuusei!! ~Zutto Kimi ga Suki datta~ (同・級・生!! ～ずっとキミがスキだった～)
- (2020) Isekai Maou wa Fujoshi o Zettai Nigasanai (異世界魔王は腐女子を絶対逃がさない)
- (2022) Retry Juliet!! (リトライジュリエット！！)
- (2023) Takanashi-ke no Imouto wa Hanayome ni naritai!! (小鳥遊家の妹は花嫁になりたいっ！！)
