= Uwasa no Midori-kun!! =

Japanese manga series by Gō Ikeyamada

- First edition of Uwasa no Midori-kun!!, published by Shogakukan on December 21, 2006

うわさの翠くん!! (Uwasa no Midori-kun!!)
- Genre: Romantic comedy, sports
- Manga
- Written by: Gō Ikeyamada
- Published by: Shogakukan
- Magazine: Shōjo Comic
- Original run: August 5, 2006 – August 5, 2008
- Volumes: 10
- Video game

Uwasa no Midori-kun!! Natsu Iro Striker
- Publisher: Idea Factory
- Genre: Action
- Platform: Nintendo DS
- Released: September 20, 2007
- Video game

Uwasa no Midori-kun!! Futari no Midori!?
- Publisher: Idea Factory
- Genre: Action
- Platform: Nintendo DS
- Released: August 21, 2008

Uwasa no Midori-kun!! (うわさの翠くん!!; lit. 'The Rumored Midori-kun!!') is a Japanese manga series written and illustrated by Gō Ikeyamada. It premiered in Shōjo Comic from December 2006 to October 2008. The individual chapters were collected and published in 10 tankōbon volumes by Shogakukan. Two of its chapters are used in Gō Ikeyamada's Shōnen x Cinderella. The manga is licensed in Taiwan by Tong Li Publishing, in Indonesia by Tiga Lancar Semesta, and in France by Kurokawa.

== Story ==
Yamate Midori is a 15-year-old girl who is described as a tomboy. One day, Midori meets a boy called Hino Tsukasa, who came to the island she lives on for vacation. He teaches her to play soccer, and she falls in love with the sport. Inspired by Tsukasa, Midori continues to play soccer, hoping to meet him again someday. When they do meet again, Tsukasa seduces Midori on their first date. To convince her to give up her virginity, which she'd been saving for her future husband, Tsukasa tells Midori they will get married in the future.

The next day, Midori finds Tsukasa demanding payment from his teammates for having won a bet. Midori laughs about how easy it is to get a 'country girl' to become intimate with him, and speculates that he will continue to do so a few more times before leaving her. When he discovers that she heard all of this, he tells her that she is at fault for being too trusting and that she should be proud to have had such an encounter with a future soccer star like himself.

Determined to defeat Tsukasa in soccer and bring him down for betraying her trust, Midori disguises herself as a boy, enrolls at the rival All-Boys High School, and joins their soccer team. Despite this, a boy in her dorm finds out about her actual gender almost immediately.

== Characters ==
=== Main characters ===
Midori Yamate (山手 翠, Yamate Midori)
Voiced by: Mariya Ise (Drama CD), Rie Kugimiya (Digicomi Version)
15 years old, she is a 1st-year girl disguised as a boy at Aoba 3rd High School, living in Aoba 3rd dormitory. She has a part-time job as a waitress to help support herself financially. At the beginning of the series, she falls in love with Tsukasa, but as a result of his behavior, her feelings become mixed and conflicting. During the series, she begins to develop feelings toward Kazuma, and at the end of the manga, she calls out Kazuma's name while she is asleep. She decides to let go of her first love, Tsukasa, to pursue her feelings for Kazuma. Eventually, Midori marries Kazuma and has a daughter named Akane, and they move to Midori's island to start a new life. There, Midori, Kazuma, and Akane are reunited with Tsukasa, his wife, and his son Kakeru.
Kazuma Shinbashi (新橋 カズマ, Shinbashi Kazuma)
Voiced by: Akira Ishida (Drama CD, Game), Hiroyuki Yoshino (Digicomi Version)
15 years old, he is in his 1st year at Aoba 3rd High School, lives in Aoba 3rd dormitory, and knows Midori is a girl. He loves Midori, acts as her protector, and is willing to do anything to keep her smiling. He is willing to put his feelings and happiness aside if it means he can help Midori. He is usually even seen helping her get closer to Tsukasa because he thinks that will make her happy. In the end, Midori confesses her love to Kazuma, and they begin dating. He proposes to her after graduation. Years later, they get married and have a daughter named Akane.
Tsukasa Hino (氷野 司, Hino Tsukasa)
Voiced by: Hikaru Midorikawa (Drama CD, Game), Yuichi Nakamura (Digicomi Version)
17 years old, he is in his 2nd year at Josei High School and is the soccer club's best player. He seduced Midori and lied to her to make her intimate with him for entertainment and as a bet with his friends. When Midori discovers this, he tells her she should not have trusted him so easily, but that she would be able to brag about being intimate with someone so far out of her league. He eventually falls in love with Midori, but he cannot show his feelings directly because of his past. Despite this, he constantly harasses her sexually when they are alone. Tsukasa also gets very jealous whenever Midori smiles due to Kazuma. They eventually reconcile when Midori discovers his past, and they date for a while, but it doesn't work out. Tsukasa later marries and has a son named Kakeru.

=== Aoba 3rd High School ===
Kouki Sagara (相楽 光輝, Sagara Kouki)
Voiced by: Reiko Takagi (Drama CD, game)
A 2nd year at Aoba 3rd High School, he is Aoba's 3rd soccer club striker. He is the son of Sagara Yuki and Moriyama Miki (the main protagonist of ' Get Love!! series by the same author) and the boyfriend of Mamoru Kaji. His body is also small, like his father's.
Kei Hodaka (穂高 慧, Hodaka Kei)
A 2nd year at Aoba 3rd High School, he is Aoba's 3rd soccer club's striker. He is Hodaka Ryu's son. He is Kouki's best friend and dating his little sister, Maki Sagara
Jin Ebisu (恵比寿, Ebisu Jin)
Voiced by: Romi Paku (Drama CD, game)
A 1st year at Aoba 3rd High School, he lives at Aoba 3rd dormitory in room 204. He is Miyu Motoyama's boyfriend. He is small, like Kouki.
Tetsu Yoyogi (代々木, Yoyogi Tetsu)
Voiced by: Kazuya Nakai (Drama CD, game)
A 1st year at Aoba 3rd High School, he lives at Aoba 3rd dormitory in room 203.
Kaoru Sugamo (巣鴨 薫, Sugamo Kaoru)
Voiced by: Daisuke Hirakawa (Drama CD, game)
A 1st year at Aoba 3rd High School, he lives at Aoba 3rd dormitory in room 205.
Tōru Shinagawa (品川 トオル, Shinagawa Tōru)
Voiced by: Tomokazu Seki (Drama CD, game)
A 2nd year at Aoba 3rd High School, he is the Aoba 3rd soccer club's striker. He recognizes that Midori is a girl at first sight. He often skips soccer practice, and he is a playboy.
Masato Gotanda (五反田 正人, Gotanda Masato)
Voiced by: Ryōtarō Okiayu (Drama CD, game)
A 3rd year at Aoba 3rd High School, he is the Aoba 3rd soccer club's goalkeeper and captain.
Tatsuya Ikebukuro (池袋 龍也, Ikebukuro Tatsuya)
Voiced by: Takehito Koyasu (Drama CD, game)
A 3rd year at Aoba 3rd High School, he is Aoba's 3rd soccer club's defender and a troublemaker.

=== Josei High School ===
Akira Kawasaki (川崎 明, Kawasaki Akira)
Voiced by: Hiro Shimono (Drama CD, game)
Tsukasa's friend in the Josei soccer club, he knows all of Tsukasa's dark past and problems and knows that Midori is a girl.
Jun Kurihama (恵比寿 仁, Kurihama Jun)
Tsukasa's junior in the Josei soccer club.
Tōgo Misaki (三崎 冬吾, Misaki Tōgo)
Voiced by: Jun Takagi (Drama CD, game)

=== Other characters ===
Wakaba Yamate (山手 若葉, Yamate Wakaba)
Midori's mother, she is a single parent.
Mamori Kaji (加持 守里, Kaji Mamori)
Daughter of Tamotsu Kaji, she is Kouki's girlfriend.
Miyu Motoyama (本山 みゆ, Motoyama Miyu)
A shy girl who later becomes Jin's girlfriend. She is Midori's friend at the café where Midori has a part-time job as a waitress.
Yūki (ユウキ, Yūki)
She fell in love at first sight with Masato after he helped her. She is Midori's friend at the café where Midori has a part-time job as a waitress.
Maki Sagara (相楽 真樹, Sagara Maki)
Kouki's little sister and Kei's girlfriend.

== Media ==
=== Manga ===
Uwasa no Midori-kun!! was written and illustrated by Gō Ikeyamada. It was serialized in Shogakukan's Shōjo Comic in December 2006 where it ran until its conclusion in October 2008. The individual chapters were collected and published in ten tankōbon volumes by Shogakukan. Two of its chapters are used in Gō Ikeyamada's Shōnen x Cinderella.

=== Games ===
The manga was adapted into a Nintendo DS game called Uwasa no Midori-kun!! Natsu Iro Striker (うわさの翠くん!! 夏色ストライカー), which was released by Idea Factory on September 20, 2007. Idea Factory released another Nintendo DS game for the series called Uwasa no Midori-kun!! Futari no Midori!? (うわさの翠くん!!2 ふたりの翠!?) on August 21, 2008.

=== Drama CD ===
Based on the manga, a Drama CD, called Uwasa no Midori-kun!! Futari no Oji to Hadaka Hime no Fukushu, was released on March 5, 2008, by Sony Music Entertainment. The songs are sung by Hikaru Midorikawa, Akira Ishida, Romi Park and Kazuya Nakai.

== Reception ==
The fifth volume of Uwasa no Midori-kun!! was ranked 10th on the Tohan charts between October 30 and November 5, 2007. The ninth volume of Uwasa no Midori-kun!! was ranked 8th on the Tohan charts between August 26 and September 1, 2008. The tenth volume of Uwasa no Midori-kun!! was ranked 22nd on the Tohan charts between October 21 to 27, 2008 and 13th on the Tohan charts between October 28 and November 3, 2008.
