= Kare First Love =

Japanese manga series

- English cover of first manga volume

彼 First Love
- Genre: Romance
- Manga
- Written by: Kaho Miyasaka
- Published by: Shogakukan
- English publisher: NA: Viz Media
- Magazine: Shōjo Comic
- Original run: March 2002 – August 2004
- Volumes: 10

Kare First Love (Japanese: 「彼」first love, Hepburn: Kare Fāsuto Rabu; "'Him': First Love") is a Japanese shōjo manga series by Kaho Miyasaka. It was originally serialized in Shōjo Comic from March 2002 to August 2004, and the individual chapters were published in ten tankōbon volumes by Shogakukan from September 2002 to December 2004. It focuses on the romance between the seemingly plain, shy Karin and the cool Aoi Kiriya, as they experience their first love.

The series is licensed for English-language release in North America by Viz Media, which released the first volume in September 2004 and the last in December 2006. It is also licensed for regional language releases in France by Panini Comics under its Génération Comics imprint, in Spain by Panini Comics, in Germany by Egmont Manga & Anime, in Denmark by Mangismo Danmark, in Sweden by Mangismo Sverige and in Taiwan by Ever Glory Publishing.

The manga has sold over 4.5 million copies in Japan. The manga have had positive response from critics for its art, however it has been criticized for not going beyond the shōjo manga boundaries.

== Plot ==
Karin Karino is a bespectacled and shy girl riding a bus with three boys from a local boys' only high school. One of them, Aoi Kiriya, is taking pictures of girls on the bus, and initially, all three make snide remarks about Karin. When he realizes she is reading a photography book called Blue by a photographer named Yuji, Kiriya approaches her, but she ignores him. As she moves to leave the bus at her stop, Karin drops her book and Kiriya accidentally lifts Karin's skirt while retrieving it for her. The skirt-lifting, combined with the fact that Kiriya still has his camera in his hand, causes Karin to think that Kiriya is "upskirting" her. Karin hits Kiriya and runs away. At school it is revealed that Karin has low self-esteem, and her "friend", Yuka Ishikawa, exploits Karin for free answers to homework and other favors.

Kiriya waits outside of her school to return the book and Yuka coerces Karin into arranging a group date. Karin arrives in her uniform, having no "date" clothes, so while the others go ahead Kiriya takes her to a clothing store and buys her a new outfit. During the date, Yuka decides she wants Kiriya, but Kiriya is only interested in Karin. When Karin gets drunk, he takes her to his place to sleep it off. In the morning, he is surprised to discover how beautiful Karin is without her glasses, though he also likes her with them on. When Yuka realizes Karin has Kiriya's attention, she grows jealous and begins bullying Karin. Karin's new, and real, friend Nanri alerts Kiriya to what is going on, after Karin stops speaking to him. He puts an end to it and Karin confirms she is attracted to him too. When Karin passed out Kiriya took her to his apartment, when she wakes up she takes off her glasses and it turns that she isn't bad looking he takes her first kiss.

They begin dating, but their relationship has its ups and downs. They fight over Kiriya's pushing Karin to sex, Karin's father disapproves of the relationship and bans Karin from leaving the house for a while, and Kiriya struggles to deal with his own family having left them to support himself after the death of his big brother. In the end, they always forgive each other after a fight and make-up.

His big brother is in fact Yuji the photographer and he died in an accident underwater. Kiriya was with him that day. Kiriya thinks that his parents blame him for his brother's death.

== Characters ==
Karin Karino (狩野 花梨, Karino Karin)
Karin is considered a plain-looking girl by most people, due to her wearing glasses and her tendency to dress conservatively. She meets Kiriya on the bus, and he is able to see past that to realize she is an attractive girl. Karin has low self-esteem at first and is unable to say the things she really wants to when being used by her so-called friend Yuka and say the things she really wants to say. Due to her self-image, she initially doubt Kiriya's compliments and thinks he's just teasing her. Through her relationship with Kiriya, and her new friendship with Nanri she finds her self-confidence. At the end of the series Kiriya proposes to her and they get married.
Aoi Kiriya (桐矢 葵, Kiriya Aoi)
Kiriya first encounters Karin on the bus to his school, when he accidentally pulls up her skirt while picking up a book she drops. He is eventually able to convince her that his attraction to her in genuine and to go out with him. As their relationship grows, Kiriya pressures Karin about sex ("h-things"), but after some arguments he allows her the time she needs to get comfortable with the idea. He has a fetish for groping Karin or observing her bust even during a serious moment, much to Karin's embarrassment of course. As he lives alone, due to a conflict with his father, Kiriya works several part-time jobs in order to support himself. He loves photography, a hobby he learned from his late brother, and wants to be a professional photographer.
Yuka Ishikawa (石川 ユカ, Ishikawa Yuka)
One of Karin's classmates who pretends to be Karin's friend. She takes advantage of Karin's shyness and low self-esteem. When she finds out Karin and Aoi are together, she becomes enraged and does things to push Karin away from him. After Aoi rescues Karin when Yuka locks her on the school's roof in the rain she stops actively bullying Karin. However when the two end up working part-time at the same restaurant, Yuka bullies Karin slightly by making her do some of her work.
Nanri Ayase (綾瀬 南里, Ayase Nanri)
Nanri is the confident girl who helps Karin in a nonchalant manner. When Yuka picks on Karin, she defends Karin or often seeks her out afterwards to see to her. She dislikes Yuka and her friends, referring to them as "low class people." She is not afraid to speak up to Yuka or call her out when she is being spiteful. She becomes best friends with Karin. She always assists Karin when it comes to problems about her relationship with Kiriya.

== Media ==
=== Manga ===
Written by Kaho Miyasaka, the first chapter of the Kare First Love manga premiered in the March 2002 issue of the bi-monthly magazine Shōjo Comic. New chapters continued running until the August 2004 issue, when the series concluded. The series was published in 10 tankōbon volumes by Shogakukan between July 26, 2002, and December 20, 2004. The fourth and seventh volumes were made available in regular and special editions, with the fourth volume special edition including a postcard, and the seventh including a DVD containing a digital manga. The manga is licensed in North America by Viz Media which released the manga between September 7, 2004, and December 12, 2006. The manga is licensed in France by Panini Comics under its Génération Comics imprint, in Spain by Panini Comics, in Germany by Egmont Manga & Anime, in Denmark by Mangismo Danmark, in Sweden by Mangismo Sverige, and in Taiwan by Ever Glory Publishing.

=== CDs ===
Pioneer Entertainment produced a drama CD, Kare First Love Dramatic Image Album (ドラマティックイメージアルバム｢彼｣first love), that was released July 23, 2004. The CD includes eight scenes and a bonus track covering volumes one through eight of the manga series.

Released September 23, 2004, Kare First Love - Songs And Melodies (彼 first love〜ソングス アンド メロディーズ〜) is an instrumental CD produced by Momo & Grapes. It features six tracks from Japanese artists Juli and Laynah.

== Reception ==
Kare First Love was well received in Japan, selling more than 1.5 million copies as of July 3, 2004. It sold 3.5 million copies with its 9 tankōbon volumes by May 2006. It is listed as IGN's 6th best shojo manga. Animefringe's Patrick King commends the manga's art as "visually pleasing", saying, " I don't think it's on the level of Yuu Watase or Miki Aihara (of Hot Gimmick fame), but [Kaho Miyasaka's] character designs exhibit a life of their own." Comics Worth Reading's Johanna Draper Carlson comments that the manga is unlike many other shōjo manga series, this one doesn't have many comedy or any fantasy or exaggerated elements. It's just a straightforward romance demonstrating universal emotions." A later review by Carlson comments on the "recurring motif of a particular song Kiriya's mother used to play for him on the piano", saying that Karin playing the song "it's almost as though she's being groomed to take over from his mother in watching out for him. On the one hand, that's poetic and symbolic of the passing of boy from son to husband; on the other, it's sort of creepy, that Karin becomes his new little mother, an impression reinforced by the relative lack of romantic elements between the two in this volume." Mania.com's Mike Dungan compares Yuka to Sae from Peach Girl: "the friend that's no friend at all." A later review by Mike Dungan commends the character design of Karin, saying, "[Karin]'s quite beautiful, but not in a garish or obvious way. It's the sort of beauty most women have, but never realize it."

Sequential Tart's Margaret O'Connell comments on the reversal of the truism present in manga aimed at female readers that "Japanese men have difficulty expressing their emotions" through her comparison of Karin with Momoka in St. Dragon Girl, where she "attempt to use Valentine's chocolates and condoms — plus an explanatory note the second time around — to convey what she is too tongue-tied to say aloud ultimately enables her to connect with the object of her affection when words have repeatedly failed her. Despite the often over the top antics of many manga characters, Japan is still a relatively undemonstrative culture by Western standards." The manga has been criticized by Snow Wildsmith from Teen Reads for not breaking "a lot of shōjo manga boundaries". Melinda Beasi further criticized the manga saying "[the manga's] premise, its conflicts, even its artwork are so closely painted by the shoujo manga numbers, it's maddening, truly."
