= Kaho Miyasaka =

Japanese manga artist

- Born: October 17; Chiba Prefecture, Japan
- Occupation: Manga artist
- Writing career
- Subject: Shōjo manga
- Website: k-miyasaka.com/english/index.html

Kaho Miyasaka (宮坂香帆, Miyasaka Kaho; born October 17 in Chiba Prefecture, Japan) is a Japanese manga artist.

Miyasaka is best known for the manga Kare First Love.

Her newest manga is called We Came to Know It (僕達は知ってしまった, Bokutachi wa Shitte Shimatta), which currently consists of 12 volumes.

== Works ==
- 16 Engage 2 volumes
- Love Love 1 volume - first volume in the "Kaporin no Yuuwaku Kissu" series
- Akutou (Scoundrel) 1 volume - second volume in the "Kaporin no Yuuwaku Kissu" series
- Kiss in the Blue 4 volumes
- Binetsu Shōjo (Feverish Girl) 10 volumes
- Miseinen Lovers went on hiatus after author's health deteriorated from cancer.
- Kare First Love 10 volumes
- Bokutachi wa Shitte Shimatta 2007, 14 volumes
- "Barairo no yakusoku" 2013
