= Sho-Comi =

Japanese manga magazine

- Cover of the October 26, 1975 issue of Shōjo Comic
- Editor-In-Chief: Junko Kanai
- Categories: Shōjo manga
- Frequency: Monthly (1968–1969); Semimonthly (1969–1970); Weekly (1970–1978); Semimonthly (1978–present)
- Circulation: 8,200; (July–September 2026)
- First issue: April 1968
- Company: Shogakukan
- Country: Japan
- Based in: Tokyo
- Language: Japanese
- Website: sho-comi.com

Sho-Comi (Japanese: 少コミ, Hepburn: Shōcomi), formerly published under its full name Shōjo Comic (少女コミック) until December 2007, is a shōjo manga magazine published semimonthly in Japan by Shogakukan since 1968. The magazine has gained a reputation for being a "love bible for maidens in love" or a "romance manga bible".

The manga featured in Sho-Comi are later compiled and published in book form (tankōbon) under the Flower Comics imprint.

== History ==
Shōjo Comic started in April 1968 as a monthly magazine, before its frequency increased to semimonthly in 1969. The frequency further increased to a weekly magazine in 1970, renaming itself to Weekly Shōjo Comic (週刊少女コミック). The magazine reverted back to the semimonthly Shōjo Comic in 1978.

Beginning with the January 2008 issue published in December 2007, the magazine was renamed Sho-Comi.

== Serializations ==
=== Current ===
- Seishun Heavy Rotation (2020–present)
- Tsugi wa Ii yo ne, Senpai (2021–present)
- Tokyo § Jinrou: Tokyo Divine Wolf (2023-present)
- Magical Girl Dandelion (2024–present)
- Gyaru to Couture: Ariake Momo wa Fuku wo Tsukutte Yuushousuru Koto ni Shita (2026-present)

=== Past ===
==== 1968–1979 ====
- Wandering Sun (1970-1971)
- Sora ga Suki! (1971–1972)
- The Heart of Thomas (1974–1975)
- Baptism (1974–1976)
- Cyborg 009 (1975–1976)
- Kaze to Ki no Uta (1976–1984)
- Star Red (1978–1979)

==== 1980–1989 ====
- Hiatari Ryōkō! (1980–1981)
- Georgie! (1982–1984)
- Onaji Kurai Ai (1984–1985)
- Purple Eyes in the Dark (1984–1986)
- Boyfriend (1985–1988)
- Momoka Typhoon (1987–1989)
- 3 – Three (1989–1992)

==== 1990–1999 ====
- Ao no Fūin (1991–1994)
- Fushigi Yûgi (1991–1996)
- Red River (1995–2002)
- Tokyo Juliet (1996–1999)
- Ceres, Celestial Legend (1996–2000)
- Sensual Phrase (1997–2000)
- Wild Act (1998–2000)
- Appare Jipangu! (1998–2003)
- Binetsu Shōjo (1999–2001)

==== 2000–2009 ====
- Imadoki! (2000–2001)
- Alice 19th (2001–2003)
- Kare First Love (2002–2004)
- Shinju no Kusari (2002)
- Boku wa Imōto ni Koi o Suru (2003–2005)
- Absolute Boyfriend (2003–2005)
- Happy Hustle High (2004–2005)
- Love Celeb (2004–2006)
- Honey × Honey Drops (2004–2006)
- Punch! (2005–2006)
- Boku no Hatsukoi o Kimi ni Sasagu (2005–2008)
- Uwasa no Midori-kun!! (2006–2008)
- Kyō, Koi o Hajimemasu (2007–2014)
- Gaba Kawa (2007)
- Suki Desu Suzuki-kun!! (2008–2012)

==== 2010–2019 ====
- Flower and the Beast (2010–2012)
- Hachimitsu ni Hatsukoi (2012–2015)
- So Cute it Hurts!! (2012–2015)
- Miseinen Dakedo Kodomo Janai (2012–2016)
- True Love (2013–2015)
- Anoko no Toriko (2013–2014)
- 4-gatsu no Kimi, Spica (2015–2019)
- Ani ni Aisaresugite Komattemasu (2015–2018)
- Uirabu. -Uiuishii Koi no Ohanashi- (2015–2017)
- Awa-Koi (2016–2018)
- Dō-Kyū-Sei: Zutto Kimi ga Suki Datta (2018–2020)

==== 2020—2029 ====
- Jingi Naki Mukotori (2020–2023)

== Reception ==
In 2007, the Japanese National PTA Conference ranked Sho-Comi the worst manga magazine for young children due to its excessive sexual content. Many concerned parents have advised publishers to be more wary of the availability of these magazines to young readers.

From January to March 2019, Sho-Comi had 70,000 physical copies in circulation, which later dropped to 68,000 from April to June 2019. From July to September 2019, the magazine had 63,000 physical copies in circulation.

== See also ==
- Betsucomi
- ChuChu
- Ciao
- Cheese!
