= Short program =

Short program and similar can mean:

- Short program (figure skating), part of a figure skating competition
- Short Program (manga), a Japanese manga series by Mitsuru Adachi
- Short Program, a live-action drama series adaptation of the manga starring members of JO1
