= Rough (manga) =

Japanese manga series

- Cover of Rough volume 1

ラフ (Rafu)
- Manga
- Written by: Mitsuru Adachi
- Published by: Shogakukan
- Magazine: Weekly Shōnen Sunday
- Original run: 1987 – 1989
- Volumes: 12
- Live-action film
- Directed by: Kentarō Ōtani
- Produced by: Kazunari Yamanaka; Osamu Kubota
- Music by: Takayuki Hattori
- Studio: Toho
- Released: August 26, 2006
- Runtime: 106 minutes

Rough (Japanese: ラフ, Hepburn: Rafu) is a manga series by Mitsuru Adachi. It was published by Shogakukan in Weekly Shōnen Sunday from 1987 to 1989, and collected in 12 tankōbon volumes. The series was adapted into a live action film in 2006, released in Japan by Toho.

== Plot ==
Rough tells the story of Keisuke Yamato, a 100 m freestyle swimmer, and Ami Ninomiya, a competitive diver as they overcome their family rivalry and fall in love with each other over the course of their high school years. Their families own competing confectionery stores and Ami has grown up hating Keisuke's family because her family believes her grandfather was driven to an early death after Keisuke's grandfather copied their signature "horned owl" manju and outsold them simply by adding "ears," making it that much larger.

== Characters ==
Keisuke Yamato (大和 圭介, Yamato Keisuke)
Portrayed by: Mokomichi Hayami
The son of a Japanese confectionery store owner and a member of Eisen Private High School's swimming club. In junior high school, he won third place in the national 100 m freestyle championship three years running. Because he is not satisfied with third place, he switches to the breaststroke at the beginning of high school. However, his coach convinces him to switch back to the 100 m and 200 m freestyle. His main problem is with his starts, but he improves after studying how Nakanishi swims.
Ami Ninomiya (二ノ宮 亜美, Ninomiya Ami)
Portrayed by: Masami Nagasawa
The daughter of a Japanese confectionery store owner and a member of the diving team in Eisen's swimming club. She has the ability to see other people's strong points and is kind to everyone except Keisuke. She sends New Year's cards to Keisuke inscribed with the word "murderer". In contrast to the heroines of many of Adachi's other series, Ami is relatively normal and average in sport, but still scores second in exams. Ami was a gymnast in junior high school, but switched to diving in high school. She was born on March 4.
Hiroki Nakanishi (仲西 弘樹, Nakanishi Hiroki)
Portrayed by: Tsuyoshi Abe
A college student and holder of the Japanese records in the 100 m and 200 m freestyle. He is a childhood friend of Ami, and wishes to become more than just a friend. Ami's father tries to arrange a marriage between Hiroki and Ami, both to cut off her growing relationship with Keisuke and to get the financial backing of the Nakanishi family. He is the youngest of three brothers.
Kaori Koyanagi (小柳 かおり, Koyanagi Kaori)
Portrayed by: Yui Ichikawa
A member of the diving team in Misugi Academy's swimming club, and current winner of 2nd place in the inter-high competitions. She has a very quick temper, and is very self-conscious of her less-developed body. In junior high school, when Keisuke mistakenly went into the girls' locker room at a swim meet and saw her naked from behind, he mistook her for a boy and told her she needed to put some more muscle. She is an intense rival to Ami, both in diving competitions and trying to interfere with her relationship with Keisuke. Yūji Serizawa is her boyfriend.
Kazuaki Seki (関 和明, Seki Kazuaki)
A member of the Eisen swim team. Tried to play basketball when entering high school to attract girls, but is clearly a better fighter than a player (probably the best fighter in the group, alongside Keisuke and Ogata). Despite barely being able to swim he joins the team after becoming infatuated with Ami. The swimming coach rigs a prohibitively difficult physical strength test to weed out new club members only there to watch the girls in the diving club and he is the only one able to pass. Keisuke comes out of his slump after being made to tutor him in swimming, forcing him to focus on swimming basics and technique. He is ranked 3rd Dan in karate.
Kyōtarō Kitano (北野 京太郎, Kitano Kyōtarō)
A member of the Eisen swim team, specializing in the butterfly. He attended the same junior high school as Ami. While he is very large and strong, he is very gentle and gets excellent grades. He ranks first in the school on the final exams his first year of high school. He is ranked second in the marathon, after Ogata.
Takeshi Ogata (緒方 剛, Ogata Takeshi)
Portrayed by: Takuya Ishida
Cleanup hitter on Eisen's baseball team. He attended the same junior high school as Ami, and she considers him a good friend. Has a short-temper and tends to resort to violence a lot, but is actually pretty clever and considerate with people he likes. In junior high, he promised to beat up anyone who asked Ami out on a date, and he followed through several times, even sending a few to the hospital. Due to an elbow injury he switched from being a pitcher to third baseman but, risking permanent damage, switches back to the position when it becomes apparent that the team has no other decent options. He is also ranked first in the intra-school marathon, and is regarded by his friends as a natural-born athlete, who can do well in any sport he tries. He moves back to his hometown during the summer of his second year in order to be closer to his ailing mother. In his departure scene, Keisuke tells him: "If baseball was a one-man sport, you'd be in Koshien (National Tournament) every year."
Masaru Kume (久米 勝, Kume Masaru)
Portrayed by: Ren Mori
A portly but muscular member of the Eisen track team, specializing in the shot put. He seems to have a good self-image, and puts a lot of passion into life. He like to flirt with girls along with Ogata but when he actually does meet a girl he likes he feels he cannot compete with his handsome friends and tries to set her up with Ogata. Ogata insults the girl, tricking Masuru into showing his best self and demonstrating how much he likes her by defending her against the insult and consoling her afterwards.
Coach Furuya (古屋先生, Furuya-sensei)
Portrayed by: Norito Yashima
The male coach of the Eisen swimming club, in charge of the swimming races (100 m and 200 m freestyle, butterfly, and so on).
Coach Sakiyama (咲山先生, Sakiyama-sensei)
Portrayed by: Maki Tamaru
The female coach of the Eisen swimming club, in charge of the diving team.
Yūji Serizawa (芹沢 裕司, Serizawa Yūji)
Holder of first place in the 100 m and 200 m freestyle inter-high records and Keisuke's rival since junior high competitions. Serizawa is arrogant and plans to beat Hiroki Nakanishi's records, but he's been unable to get past a plateau in his times, which scares him. Kaori Koyanagi is his girlfriend.
Kōsuke Yamato (大和 康介, Yamato Kōsuke)
Keisuke's father and owner of the Yamato confectionery shop, which he inherited from his father. He is a lech (he hits on any young girl he meets), and a bad businessman but has a discerning eye when it comes to Ami and Keisuke's relationship.
Ami's father (亜美の父親, Ami no Chichioya)
Portrayed by: Yutaka Matsushige
Owner of the Ninomiya confectionery shop. Although he has successfully expanded his business and overtaken the Yamato shop in every way he still deeply resents them for the previous generation's insult, blaming them for the death of his father. Every night before going to bed, he yells, "Die, Yamatos!" on his veranda. Keisuke is initially introduced to him as "Keisuke Yamada" to hide that he's the son of the rival Yamato family, and Ninomiya takes a liking to Keisuke. He is a 3rd Dan in judo.
Keisuke (けいすけ or 鶏助)
A chick bought to commemorate a date between Keisuke Yamato and Ami Ninomiya. By the end of the series, it grows into a rooster. The chick was named by Ami's roommate, who was not aware of Ami's hatred of Yamato family and Keisuke in particular. When written in kanji, the kei (鶏) can be read as "chicken" and suke (助) as "rescued", so its name can mean "rescued chicken". Keisuke appears on the spine of the bunkoban editions of the Rough manga.
Narita (成田)
The leader of the delinquent gang at Eisen Private High School. When he first appears, he meets and completely fails to bully and intimidate each of the main male cast members, telling each of them to call him senpai to show the proper respect to seniors. He is a third year when the series begins but never graduates, presumably failing each year until he is in the same year as the main cast. While he has a menacing appearance, he often helps people out when they need it. He has had trouble remembering names since he was little. He makes a cameo appearance in Adachi's more recent work, Cross Game, where he is a boxing club member who is interested in Aoba Tsukishima but the story is completely unrelated.
Gramps Ōba (大場のじいさん, Ōba no Jiisan)
Master of an aikido dojo and old friend of both the Yamato and Ninomiya families. When the feud broke out between Keisuke's and Ami's parents and they were too busy competing with each other, he watched the two children. Unbeknownst to the parents, Keisuke and Ami became good friends while they were young, though neither remembers knowing the other when they were young. After they grew older, Ōba decided to keep an eye on them.

=== Other film characters ===
Reiko Kinoshita (木下 理恵子, Kinoshita Reiko)
Portrayed by: Mai Takahashi
Midori Shōji (東海林 緑, Shōji Midori)
Portrayed by: Manami Kurose
Shigeko Shōji (東海林 茂子, Shōji Shigeko)
Portrayed by: Eriko Watanabe
Haruko Tanuma (田沼 春子, Tanuma Haruko)
Portrayed by: Natsu Andō
Isamu Wataru (渡 いさむ, Wataru Isamu)
Portrayed by: Yū Tokui
Female students
Portrayed by: Ayaka Ikezaka, Yūko Masumoto

== Live-action film ==
A live-action film based on Rough was released in Japan on 26 August 2006 by Toho. It follows the same basic story, though in a somewhat condensed form.

=== Staff ===
- Director: Kentarō Ōtani
- Screenplay: Arisa Kaneko
- Music: Takayuki Hattori
  - Theme song: Guarana (ガラナ, Garana), performed by Sukima Switch
  - Insert songs: Touching the Future (ふれて未来を, Furete Mirai o), Full-Powered Boys (全力少年, Zenryoku Shōnen), Kanade (奏), all performed by Sukima Switch
  - Special insert song: Forever with You (君といつまでも, Kimi to Itsumademo), performed by Yūzō Kayama
- Development Assistance: Yūji Yamagata, Shiho Kawauchi, Tomomi Sakaguchi
- Production Supervisor: Hideyuki Honma
- Planning: Genki Kawamura
- Producers: Kazunari Yamanaka, Osamu Kubota
- Line Producer: Kōji Maeda
- Casting Producer: Shiro Kido
- Production: Toho
- Distribution: Toho
