= Idol Ace =

Japanese manga

- Idol A
- First page of the series.

アイドルA(エース) (Aidoru Ēsu)
- Manga
- Written by: Mitsuru Adachi
- Published by: Shogakukan
- Magazine: Weekly Young Sunday; Monthly Shōnen Sunday
- Original run: 2005 – 2011
- Volumes: 1

Idol A (Japanese: アイドルA(エース), Hepburn: Aidoru Eisu) is a Japanese manga written by Mitsuru Adachi. The first 3 chapters were published irregularly in Weekly Young Sunday between 2005 and 2007 and collected in Short Program 3 tankōbon. Later, chapter 4 was released in volume 36-37 of the 2007 series of Weekly Young Sunday and chapters 5 and 6 were released in the November 2010 and August 2011 editions of Monthly Shōnen Sunday. Chapters 1-6 were released in a tankoubon dedicated to the series, published in 2011. The Idol A tankoubon includes chapters 1 to 6 and an extra manga chapter commemorating 40 years of Mitsuru Adachi manga career, done by himself and fellow manga creator Rumiko Takahashi.

== Plot ==
Azusa Satomi is a high school girl who has a successful career as an idol and who wishes to play on the high school baseball team, but cannot due to the rules. Her father is the team's coach, and her best friend Keita Hirayama happens to look very much like her, so she is able to do a swap with him during games and meet her dream.

== Characters ==
Azusa Satomi (里美あずさ, Satomi Azusa)
An up-and-coming idol star who has always dreamed of playing for a high school baseball team and going to Kōshien; however, due to the rules of high school baseball in Japan she can not play on the team. Her childhood friend Keita looks a lot like her, and because her father is the coach of the baseball team at their high school, they are able to convince Keita to switch with her during games. This means he has to dress up like Satomi during the games.
Keita Hirayama (平山圭太, Hirayama Keita)
Satomi's childhood friend, and an average baseball player. He grudgingly plays along with Satomi's plans to take the baseball team to Kōshien. He uses a wig when impersonating her. She also uses the wing when they exchange roles, as she her cut her hair as to be able to impersonate him.

== Web video ==
In summer 2005 a 2.5 minutes long original promotional video animated by studio OLM was produced by Shogakukan for the then-upcoming release of the Idol Ace manga in the Weekly Young Sunday magazine.

The short features Azusa being recorded throughout the day by a peeping pervert.
