= Jinbē =

Romance manga by Mitsuru Adachi

- Cover of Jinbē manga.

じんべえ
- Manga
- Written by: Mitsuru Adachi
- Published by: Shogakukan
- Magazine: Big Comic Original
- Original run: 1992 – 1997
- Volumes: 1
- Television drama
- Original network: Fuji TV
- Original run: October 12, 1998 – December 21, 1998
- Episodes: 11

Jinbē (じんべえ) is a romance manga by Mitsuru Adachi. It appeared irregularly in the manga magazine Big Comic Original from 1992 through 1997, and was collected in one tankōbon volume in May 1997. In 1998, it was adapted as an 11-episode television drama series by Fuji TV.

== Plot ==
Jinbē is the story of the relationship between Jinpei and his stepdaughter, Miku. Miku's mother died after being married to Jinpei for a little over a year, when Miku was 13 years old, and Jinpei has been raising Miku alone since then. The series has a very delicate touch with the romantic issues. Adachi dealt with a similar situation, a brother and sister who are not related by blood, in his earlier series Miyuki.

== Main characters ==
The information in the "Portrayed by" line is for the live action drama. Additional cast members are listed below in that section.

Jinpei Takanashi (高梨 陣平, Takanashi Jinpei)
Portrayed by: Masakazu Tamura
Jinpei, also known as Jinbē (meaning whale shark), lives with his step-daughter Miku. His wife, Rikako, died three years prior to the beginning of the story after being married to him for just over a year. Jinpei works at Sansun Aquarium. While in college, he was a famous goalkeeper for his university's soccer team.
Miku Takanashi (高梨 美久, Takanashi Miku)
Portrayed by: Takako Matsu
Miku is Jinpei's 17-year-old step-daughter, and the daughter of Rikako and Yukio Miyage. Her parents divorced nine years prior to the story's start, and her mother married Jinpei about five years later. She is in the photography club in high school, and is pursued romantically by Jinishi. However, she was always predestined to have a romantic relationship with her step-father, despite their initial denial throughout the story.

== Manga ==
The series has been collected into one tankōbon, published by Shogakukan.

No.	Japanese release date	Japanese ISBN
01	May 30, 1997	4-09-184831-1

== TV Drama ==
Broadcast on Fuji TV from October 12, 1998 – December 21, 1998, Jinbē garnered an average 15.9% rating. It aired on Monday nights from 9:00—9:54 pm, with the final episode airing from 9:00—10:24 pm.

=== Cast ===
- Jinbei Takanashi: Masakazu Tamura
- Miku Takanashi: Takako Matsu
- Makoto Teranishi: Tsuyoshi Kusanagi
- Michiko Tsujima: Reiko Takashima
- Shūichi Ishizuka: Takashi Ukaji
- Yukio Miyage: Kōji Shimizu
- Manabu Mitamura: Leo Morimoto
- Mayumi Ōzaki: Mayuko Nishiyama
- Tomoko Machiyama: Mami Kurosaka
- Hiro: Masashi Kōda
- Masao Imafuku

=== Staff ===
- Original Story: Mitsuru Adachi
- Script: Noriko Yoshida
- Music: SR Smoothy Opus One
- Executive Producers: Kōzō Nagayama, Tatsuaki Kimura
- Producer: Nobuhiro Sugio
- Assistant Executive Producer: Masaki Nishiura
- Assistant Producer: Chiyoko Asakura
- Publicity: Itsuko Onuki
- Production Diary: Ryōko Sakuma, Kazuyo Oda
- Executive Producer: Masako Tani
- Production Chief: Nobuhiro Kayama, Nobuyuki Shintani
- Music and Sound Effects: Yoshio Onuki
- In cooperation with Kinuta Studio, K&L, Basuku, Active, Two-One, Institute of Cetacean Research, Fennec, FC Plan, Japan Underwater Films, Japan Airlines
- Production Undewriting: Fuji TV
