= Shōnen Big Comic =

Japanese manga magazine

- Cover of Shōnen Big Comic 1985 issue 18.
- Categories: Shōnen manga
- Frequency: Bi-weekly
- First issue: December 1976 as Manga-kun; 1979
- Final issue: 1987
- Company: Shogakukan
- Country: Japan
- Based in: Tokyo
- Language: Japanese

Shōnen Big Comic (少年ビッグコミック, Shōnen Biggu Komikku) was a bi-weekly manga magazine published by Shogakukan in Japan from 1979 to 1987. From 1976 to 1979, the magazine was titled Manga-kun (マンガくん) before being renamed Shōnen Big Comics in 1979. In 1987, the magazine changed format and was renamed Weekly Young Sunday. Several of the series appearing in Shōnen Big Comic have been adapted into anime, including Esper Mami, Area 88, and Miyuki.

== Works ==
=== Manga-kun era ===
Series marked with a ♣ appeared in the first issue.

Cover of the first issue of Manga-kun, released in December 1976.

- Bīdama Shachō by Kimio Yanagisawa ♣
- Burai the Kid by Go Nagai ♣
- Esper Mami by Fujiko F. Fujio ♣
- Kokoroman by George Akiyama ♣
- Kuru Kuru Pa! X by Yuki Hijiri
- Kyūdo-kun by Shinji Mizushima ♣
- Manga Kenkyūkai by Shōtarō Ishinomori ♣
- Otoko Konbē by Mikio Yoshimori ♣
- Propeller 7 by Leiji Matsumoto
- Rabbit-kun by Tatsuhiko Yamagami
- Saibō Ushi Usshī by Tatsuo Oda
- Susume! Jets by Yuki Hijiri
- Tatoru-kun by Fujio Akatsuka ♣
- Teppengaki Taishō by Hiroshi Motomiya ♣
- Uchūsen Magellan by Mitsuteru Yokoyama
- Washi to Taka by Yū Koyama
- Zero Racer by Jōya Kagemaru

The magazine also featured a non-manga column titled Moving Toys Craft (ムービング・トイズ・クラフト, Mūbingu Toizu Kurafuto), which discussed construction of motorized toys such as radio controlled cars. The column was sponsored by Mabuchi Motor and Tamiya Corporation.

=== Shōnen Big Comic era ===
- Ai ga Yuku by Yū Koyama
- Area 88 by Kaoru Shintani
- Cyborg 009 by Shōtarō Ishinomori
- George-kun no Ningen Zukan by George Tokoro
- Hadashi no Kabe by Motoka Murakami
- Hatsukoi Scandal by Akira Oze
- Henkīn Tamaidā by Go Nagai
- Ichigekiden by Yasuichi Ōshima
- Jūki Kōhei Xenon by Masaomi Kanzaki
- Kaze no Saburō by Yū Koyama
- Miyuki by Mitsuru Adachi
- Nekketsu! Spectrum Gakuen by Yuki Hijiri
- Ningen o Koerumono Ein by Kōichi Iimori
- Seito Donmai by Hideo Hijiri
- Short Program (some chapters) by Mitsuru Adachi
- Sorairo Miina by Taku Kitazaki
- Tōi Itadaki by Motoka Murakami
- Tokyo Tanteidan by Fujihiko Hosono
- War Cry by Ryūji Ryūzaki
- Xenon by Masaomi Kanzaki
- Yon-chōme Big League by Yoshimi Kurata
