= Niji-iro Tōgarashi =

Japanese manga series

- First volume cover, featuring Shichimi (right) and Natane

虹色とうがらし
- Genre: Adventure; Comedy; Historical sci-fi
- Manga
- Written by: Mitsuru Adachi
- Published by: Shogakukan
- Imprint: Shōnen Sunday Comics
- Magazine: Weekly Shōnen Sunday
- Original run: January 11, 1990 – April 29, 1992
- Volumes: 11
- icon

Niji-iro Tōgarashi (虹色とうがらし; lit. "Rainbow-colored Chili Powder") is a Japanese manga series written and illustrated by Mitsuru Adachi. It was serialized in Shogakukan's shōnen manga magazine Weekly Shōnen Sunday from January 1990 to April 1992, with its chapters collected in 11 tankōbon volumes. The story is set in a place very similar in appearance to Earth in the Edo period; however, Adachi regularly reminds the reader all throughout the series that the setting is another planet in the distant future which just happens to look like Earth.

After the death of his mother, Shichimi sets out to join his half-brothers and -sister who live together in Karakuri Tenement, a place provided by the father they have never met. He finds out that each of them had different mothers (all of whom have died), but were fathered by the same man. Not long after Shichimi's arrival, the siblings decide to journey to visit the graves of each of their mothers. On this journey, they encounter many dangers.

The names are puns on Japanese spices, each one being an ingredient in shichimi tōgarashi, also known since the Edo period as nana-iro tōgarashi, a seasoning made of seven ingredients including chili powder.

== Characters ==
=== Seven siblings ===
Shichimi (七味)
The fourth oldest of the sibling at 15 years old. In his hometown, he was a fireman. He is an expert at using a fireman's pike, and he uses a telescoping one – created by Chinpi – as a weapon. He is the only one of the siblings who openly dislikes their mysterious father. Unexpectedly strong, he is the second strongest fighter (or may be the first), behind Asajirō, in their family. Shichimi cannot swim, and fears open water, ships and islands.
Goma (胡麻)
Goma is the oldest of the siblings at 22 years old. He is a rakugo comedian; his stage name is Hirateigoma. He gets along very well with the third brother Keshi, sharing many habits including feasting, drinking, shogi and go. Goma means sesame in Japanese.
Asajirō (麻次郎)
Asajirō is the second oldest, 20 years old, and a wandering artist. He frequently takes long trips for inspiration, occasionally briefly stopping by the tenement between trips. He holds the record for being the youngest to achieve the rank of master in the Haniwa-style sword technique. He has the ability of foresight and usually subconsciously depicted his visions in drawings; at the end of the manga, he subconsciously drew Shichimi and Natane in their future wedding. The first character of Asajiro's name means hemp.
Keshi (芥子, Keshi)
The third oldest, 18 years old, and raised as a monk in a Buddhist temple. He is an extremely strong martial artist, though he is weak when it comes to alcohol and dealing with women. It seems he was a bully when he was a kid, seen from the attitude of villagers (and his friend) after they hear his name. Keshi means poppy seed.
Natane (菜種)
The only girl among the siblings, Natane is 13 years old. She has learned her swordcraft and painting from Asajirō, and has become very skilled. She is constantly bickering with Shichimi. Natane means rapeseed. Later in the series, she learned that she was actually an adopted daughter of the shogun, unlike the other siblings. She frequently had dreams about a brother she had who abandoned her when they were children. That brother was ultimately revealed as Furon. In the last chapter, Asajirō foresaw her marriage with her adoptive brother Shichimi.
Chinpi (陳皮)
Chinpi is a brilliant inventor despite being only 10 years old. He wears glasses, and is the second youngest. He is also shown as a skilled craftsman, making various tools and weapons, including Shichimi's pike, explosive ammunition, and even a helicopter for dispersing pesticide and herbicide. Chinpi means citrus peel.
Sanshō (山椒)
The youngest, at three years old, Sanshō possesses amazing ninjutsu abilities due to his frequent training with Hanzō, head of the ninja clan under the shogun's command and came from a ninja village. Sanshō mean Sichuan pepper.
Furon (浮論)
A very powerful swordsman who wanders around in search of his step-sister Natane, and the true child of the shogun, thus the true one of the seven siblings. After accidentally killing his step-father as a child in a training session, he left home and went on for training out of guilt. Nearly at the end of the manga, he made the ultimate sacrifice of his life to protect Natane from Shōgo's trap. Even at the last moment of his life, he refused to acknowledge any relation other than that to his sister when Shichimi told him the truth.

=== The Shogunate ===
Okugawa Akimitsu (奥川 秋光)
The eighth shogun of the Okugawa clan (possibly a spoof on the actual shogun clan of Tokugawa). He appeared to be a happy-go-lucky pervert who frequently wandered from town to town and neglected his shogun duty, but he was also a very skilled swordsman, which enabled him to save his son Shichimi and his daughter Natane. His perversion was evidenced by the fact that he had six different children with six different women, who had all died by the time the story took place. His encounter with Shichimi and Natane on their way to pay tribute to all of the mothers later revealed that Natane was not his blood daughter and that brother of hers was his blood son. He liked to put on several disguises to help his children, one of which involved a mask of Ranma from Ranma ½.
Princess Koto (琴姫, Koto-hime)
Akimitsu's sassy and entitled princess. She always wore western clothes, and always hated Natane due to her closeness with Shichimi. She eavesdropped the truth from the shogun and went straight to tell it in order to hurt Natane.
Hikoroku (彦六)
An old man who served the shogun and kept him in check. He gathered all the siblings (except Furon) at a shared home, but never told them who their father was.
Hanzō (半蔵)
Likely based on Hattori Hanzō, he was a master ninja. Under Hikoroku's instructions, he gave his all to keeping the shogun's children from harm's way (including destroying evidence of Natane's true origin), which ultimately cost him his life to Shōgo's dirty trick.

=== Other characters ===
Captain Ban (バン艦長)
An actual alien who came with his partner from another Earth, one that was a lot more modern and polluted, unlike this Earth which was still in feudal times, although everyone else at the time just thought of them as western foreigners. He frequently had nightmares about the polluted Earth he ran away from, except for that one time when he, for some reason, "exchanged" dreams with the shogun for a "wetter" one, which made the shogun wake up at night because of the strange dream he got in return. At first, he schemed to influence the shogunate, but later he decided settle on this Earth, got married with a Japanese woman, and decided to devote his life to building a better world unlike his former one.
Okugawa Takamitsu (奥川 貴光)
Akimitsu's younger brother. He always tried to overthrow his brother with his evil schemes, with the help from the "foreigners". He ultimately died by karma: being stung by a poisonous wasp.
Shōgo (省吾)
Takamitsu's disgruntled son who had "daddy issues" with his father, who never cared about him and his mother. He always tried to kill Shichimi and take Natane away. At one encounter, he had to retreat because the shogun intervened to save his children in the Ranma mask.
Akamaru (赤丸)
A cowardly and incompetent ninja who served Takamitsu. He considered himself to be Hanzō's rival, and he was assigned to assassinate the shogun's children. Of course, he could never succeed as they were protected by Hanzō, but also because of his utmost cowardice and incompetence. When Hanzō died, it was stated that Akamaru would never die because of his stupidity.
Billy (ビリー, Birī)
An American boy who got stranded in Japan and captured by a Japanese ship. Captain Ban sent assassins to kill him in fear that he would expose their true nature. He was saved by Shichimi's gang and followed them since. He could barely speak Japanese, but somehow he was able to understand Japanese up to a point. His home state's name, Ohio, sounded almost like ohayo, the Japanese word for "good morning", which triggered Natane and Shichimi into killing their own siblings when they were under hypnosis from one of Takamitsu's assassins. At the end of the manga, he dated Koto because she could not continue to hit on Shichimi now that she knew he was her brother.

== Media ==
=== Manga ===
Written and illustrated by Mitsuru Adachi, Niji-iro Tōgarashi was serialized in Shogakukan's shōnen manga magazine Weekly Shōnen Sunday from January 11, 1990, to April 29, 1992. Shogakukan collected its chapters in 11 tankōbon volumes, released from August 18, 1990, to May 18, 1992. Shogakukan republished the series in a six-volume bunkoban edition from May 16 to September 14, 2002.

==== Volumes ====
No.	Release date	ISBN
1	August 18, 1990	4-09-122461-X
2	October 18, 1990	4-09-122462-8
3	May 18, 1991	4-09-122463-6
4	June 18, 1991	4-09-122464-4
5	August 9, 1991	4-09-122465-2
6	October 18, 1991	4-09-122466-0
7	November 18, 1991	4-09-122467-9
8	December 11, 1991	4-09-122468-7
9	March 18, 1992	4-09-122469-5
10	April 17, 1992	4-09-122470-9
11	May 18, 1992	4-09-123081-4

=== Stage play ===
In May 2021, a stage play adaptation of the series was announced. The play ran for 16 shows from August 28 to September 5, 2021, in Ikebukuro's Owl Spot theater.
