= Lycanthrope Leo =

Japanese manga series

- First tankōbon volume cover

烈王(レオ) (Reo)
- Genre: Action; Dark fantasy
- Manga
- Written by: Kengo Kaji
- Illustrated by: Kenji Okamura
- Published by: Shogakukan
- English publisher: NA: Viz Media
- Magazine: Young Sunday
- Original run: December 27, 1991 – September 10, 1993
- Volumes: 4

Lycanthrope Leo (Japanese: 烈王(レオ), Hepburn: Reo) is a Japanese manga series written by Kengo Kaji and illustrated by Kenji Okamura. It was serialized in Shogakukan's seinen manga magazine Young Sunday from 1991 to 1993, with its chapters collected in four tankōbon volumes.

== Publication ==
Written by Kengo Kaji and illustrated by Kenji Okamura, Lycanthrope Leo was serialized in Shogakukan's seinen manga magazine Young Sunday from December 27, 1991, to September 10, 1993. (Note: It was published in the magazine from the 24th issue of 1991 (with cover date December 27) to the 17th issue of 1993 (with cover date September 10).) Shogakukan collected its chapters in four tankōbon volumes, released from July 4, 1992, to November 5, 1993.

In North America, the manga was published in an American comic book format by Viz Communications, with seven issues released in 1994. It was later published in graphic novel format; however, it was canceled after releasing one volume.

=== Volumes ===
No.	Original release date	Original ISBN	English release date	English ISBN
1	July 4, 1992	4-09-151391-3	January 5, 1999	1-56931-237-0
2	January 9, 1993	4-09-151392-1	—	—
3	May 10, 1993	4-09-151393-X	—	—
4	November 5, 1993	4-09-151394-8	—	—
