= Mami the Psychic =

Japanese manga series

- The cover of the first tankōbon, released in Japan by Shogakukan

エスパー魔美 (Esupā Mami)
- Genre: Magical girl
- Manga
- Written by: Fujiko Fujio
- Published by: Shogakukan
- Imprint: Tentōmushi Comics
- Magazine: Shōnen Big Comic
- Original run: 1977 – 1983
- Volumes: 9
- Anime television series
- Directed by: Keiichi Hara
- Produced by: Junichi Kimura (TV Asahi); Yoshiaki Koizumi (TV Asahi); Sōichi Besshi (Shin-Ei Animation); Hitoshi Mogi (Shin-Ei Animation)
- Music by: Kohei Tanaka
- Studio: Shin-Ei Animation
- Original network: ANN (TV Asahi)
- Original run: April 7, 1987 – October 26, 1989
- Episodes: 119 + 1 special
- Anime film

ESPer Mami: Hoshizora no Dancing Doll
- Directed by: Keiichi Hara
- Produced by: Sōichi Besshi; Yoshiaki Koizumi; Junichi Kimura
- Written by: Sukehiro Tomita
- Music by: Kohei Tanaka
- Studio: Shin-Ei Animation
- Released: March 12, 1988
- Runtime: 41 minutes

Mami the Psychic (エスパー魔美, Esupā Mami; "ESPer Mami") is a manga series created by Fujiko F. Fujio (Note: Previously credited as Fujiko Fujio during its original serialization.) in 1977 and serialized in Shōnen Big Comic. It tells stories about Mami, a middle schoolgirl who one day finds out she has various psychic powers, and how she uses them to help people.

The series was later adapted into an anime series in 1987 and an anime film in 1988.

This series has a similar premise to one of Fujiko F. Fujio's earlier shorts titled Akage no Anko ("Redheaded Anko"), later retitled Anko Ōi ni Okoru ("When Anko Really Gets Angry"), which is about Anko Aoyama, a schoolgirl who discovers her psychic powers and the dark secret of her mother's lineage of true witches, and who also poses nude for her own father.

== Plot ==
Mami Sakura used to be a normal junior high school student, but she happened to acquire supernatural powers. Using her powers and with the help of her friend, Kazuo Takahata, she solves mysterious occurrences.

She then saves people in trouble with her psychic powers, such as telekinesis and telepathy. When she senses someone needs help, she uses the "Teleportation Gun" (a heart-shaped brooch Takahata designs) and transports herself there. Mami's teleportation is only triggered when a projectile is flying toward her, and this locket that shoots out tiny marbles is a portable gadget for teleporting in a controlled way, rather than by chance. Her telekinesis can be precise to a cellular level, which enables her to transport cancerous cells out of one of her father's art critics. Her telepathy allows her to access people's thoughts and dreams.

== Character ==
Mami Sakura (佐倉 魔美, Sakura Mami) (voiced by Keiko Yokozawa)
The chief character. A student of Tobita Junior High School in "the Sama hill", in the suburbs of Tokyo. Her powers are awakened by an unexpected coincidence and she uses the power for acts of kindness afterward. She is bright, but careless and rather meddlesome. Mami isn't very good at studying or housework, especially cooking, which becomes a recurring joke throughout the series. Her father is an artist, and Mami usually poses as a nude model for his painting in exchange for more allowances. She was going to reveal her supernatural power to her father, but her friend Kazuo told her that her French ancestors were hunted as witches, and refrains from telling him. She is sometimes called "Mami-kō" by her father (with 公 kō, literally "duke" or "European sovereign prince", being used in a disdainful way). Mami has a red hair. She wears a white shirt with a sailor neckerchief, a light blue scarf, blue skirt, white socks and black shoes. When Mami prepared to fly in the sky every night, she wears a white shirt with short sleeves, blue dress, white socks and black shoes. Mami's main power is telekinesis. She also possesses a levitation ability (she can float not only herself but several objects at the same time), telepathy and teleportation, although, she often collides with objects and other people. Takahata created a teleportation gun, so that Mami can control her teleportation.
Kazuo Takahata (高畑 和夫, Takahata Kazuo) (voiced by Hiroyuki Shibamoto)
A student of Tobita Junior High School and Mami's best friend. He originally thought Mami's supernatural powers are his, which upset him greatly when he found the truth but later supports Mami in developing her powers. He is a real genius, helping Mami understand her powers and develop them. Although he really likes amateur baseball, he is awful at it, which make Mami sometimes secretly interfere to help his team. He often comes up with alibis for Mami whenever she gets in trouble with her parents. He has a good understanding of Mami, and often supports her.
Konpoco (コンポコ, Konpoko) (voiced by Akari Hibino)
A dog which looks more like a raccoon dog or fox, and Mami's pet. He loves fried bean curd, and often cries "Fyan Fyan". Mary, the neighbor's dog, likes him. He understands human words and always gets offended if being mistaken for a fox/raccoon dog (a trait shared by another Fujiko F. Fujio character, Doraemon the robot cat). Originally he hates Kazuo because he often accidentally sing songs about raccoon dogs but later becomes friend when Kazuo saved Mami from a collapsed tunnel.
Juro Sakura (佐倉 十朗, Sakura Juurou) (voiced by Hiroshi Masuoka)
Mami's father and a painter. He often holds private exhibitions (but the pictures don't sell very well) and also works as art lecturer in a municipal senior high school. He is a laid back, clumsy person who enjoys pickled radish and smoking pipe. His grandfather married a French painter, whose lineage is believed to be the source of Mami's powers. He made an evacuation of schoolchildren in Yamanashi during the war. Because his father was affiliated with Europe and America, he was often bullied in his youth. He calls his daughter "Mami-kō" (Mami duke). He has a younger brother named Hyakuro, and Ichiro, an older brother in the country.
Naoko Sakura (佐倉 菜穂子, Sakura Naoko) (voiced by Yoshiko Sakakibara)
Mami's mother. She works at the foreign desk of Asauri Newspaper. She is a person of high morals. She often scorns Mami over her study and housework.
Hosoya (細矢さん, Hosoya-san) (voiced by Yumi Nakatani)
The woman who lives in the same town as the Sakuras. She likes gossip.
Satoru Takenaga (竹長 悟, Takenaga Satoru) (voiced by Nozomu Sasaki)
Mami's classmate and a baseball friend of Takahata. He seems to be Yukiko's boyfriend. A person with strong sense of justice, he is a member to the newspaper club, though rather unreliable, but does not yield to threats from delinquents.
Noriko Momoi (桃井 のり子, Momoi Noriko) (voiced by Yuriko Fuchizaki)
One of Mami's friends. Her pet name is "Non". She is a very optimistic person. She loves to cook, and often feeds Mami and Takahata.
Sachiko Mamiya (間宮 幸子, Sachiko Yukiko) (voiced by Hiroko Emori)
One of Mami's friends. Her pet name is "Sacchan". She is the calmest of the group. She seems to be Takenaga's girlfriend.
Tsuyoshi Banno (番野 兆治, Banno Tsuyoshi) (voiced by Yoku Shioya)
The delinquent. Mami's powers first surfaced when his group attacked Takabata. Mami's powers once temporarily shifted to him by accident.
Takashi Tomiyama (富山 高志, Tomiyama Takashi) (voiced by Yoshikazu Hirano)
Mami's classmate. Wears glasses and is a classic music enthusiast.
Narihiro Arihara (有原 成宏, Arihara Narihiro) (voiced by Hirotaka Suzuoki)
Director of the movie club at Tobita Junior High School. He planned to do a movie called "Transparent Dracula", featuring a character like Mami, but he wanted a nude scene of the character.
Shohei Kurosawa (黒沢 庄平, Kurosawa Shouhei) (voiced by Nobuo Tobita)
Vice Director of the Tobita movie club. He was engaged in film photography when he spotted manipulation had been added to the picture (by Mami). He began to believe that Mami was an esper, and started following her around. His father is a director of a first-class business company.
Taeko Kuroyuki (黒雪 妙子, Kuroyuki Taeko) (voiced by Hiromi Tsuru)
A childhood friend of Takahata. She calls Takabata "Kazuo" and is called "the wonder" from Takahata. She is in her early twenties, and usually rides a motorcycle. She likes disco and liquor.

== Media ==
=== Anime ===
The animated adaptation of the series aired in Japan from April 7, 1987, to October 26, 1989, with 119 episodes and a TV special being broadcast. Four pieces of theme music were used for it: two opening themes and two ending themes. The first opening theme is "Teleporation ~Unidentified Love~" (テレポーテーション–恋の未確認–, Teleportation –Koi no Mikakunin–) by Hashimoto Ushio, which was used for episodes 1–107, and the TV special. The second opening theme is "S・O・S" by Hashimoto Ushio and SHINES, which was used for episodes 108–119. The first ending theme is "Mysterious Angel" (不思議 Angel, Fushigi Angel) by Hashimoto Ushio, which was used for episodes 28–107. The second ending theme is "I Like You Because I Love You" (I Like YouからI Love You, I Like You Kara I Love You) by Hashimoto Ushio, which was used for episodes 108–119. Episodes 1-27 did not have an ending theme because they were aired as part of a block of other Fujiko F. Fujio anime, which had its own ending theme for the entire block. One insert song was also featured in episode 30, entitled "Heartbreak" (ハート ブレイク) by Junichiro Oda, and was originally composed as an image song based on the popular 1987 Shōjo manga series, "Nanairo Magic" by Yū Asagiri.

The series was not available on home video in any form until 2003, in which 12 of the 119 episodes were released on 6 VHS cassette tapes、(each tape having two episodes). The "Dancing Dolls in the Starlit Sky" short film, which had originally premiered in Japanese theaters on March 12, 1988, as a pre-movie bonus before Doraemon: The Record of Nobita's Parallel Visit to the West, was also released on a 2003 VHS cassette tape with the "Pro Golfer Saru" short film. These VHS tapes were marked only for use in rental video shops in Japan, and could not be sold in stores.

The complete TV series was first released as individual rental-only DVDs in October 2007, and as retail DVDs for purchase beginning on December 20, 2007. The retail DVDs were released in two box sets, the first of which contained episodes 1-60, and the second containing episodes 61-119 and "My Angel, Mami-chan", the main story from the TV special that originally aired on December 27, 1988. However, due to manufacturing issues, the next episode previews that originally followed each episode were left off of the first box set. In order to make up for their error, the publisher of the DVDs included a mail-in form in which those who bought both box sets could send in proof of purchases for them and receive a "ESPer Mami Special DVD" that contained the next episode previews for all 119 episodes, along with the unaired pilot film for the series, creditless opening and ending theme songs, promotional videos used to promote the series prior to it first premiering, and the animated interstitials for the TV special that were edited out of the main DVDs.

Due to the many problems with the two original DVD releases, the animated series was re-released as a single 21-disc "Anniversary DVD Box" on October 29, 2014. This new anniversary set was released with the same material as the two previous 10-disc box sets and the Special DVD, except that the previews for episodes 1-60 were included at the end of each episode, and the space that was used for the previews on the Special 21st disc was replaced with the "Dancing Dolls in the Starlit Sky" animated movie that had not previously been released on DVD.

In May 2018, it was announced that the Yahoo! Japan had picked up the rights to stream a new digitally remastered 1080p HD version of the ESPer Mami series on their "GYAO!" online video streaming service. As it is a remaster, this version does not have the faded colors and mis-coloring that had been present on the DVD versions. GYAO! began streaming the remastered series for free on May 22, 2018, with one new episode being added to the service each day, and each episode being available for viewing for 14 days after it first appeared on the website, after which it was removed.

The series was also translated and dubbed in various countries.

=== Television drama ===
A 12-episode live action drama adaptation aired on NHK Educational TV from January 5 to March 23, 2002.

== See also ==
- Perman, a manga about grade school superheroes.
