= Katsu! =

Japanese manga series

- First tankōbon volume cover, featuring Katsuki Satoyama
- Genre: Romantic comedy; Sports
- Manga
- Written by: Mitsuru Adachi
- Published by: Shogakukan
- Imprint: Shōnen Sunday Comics
- Magazine: Weekly Shōnen Sunday
- Original run: August 8, 2001 – February 16, 2005
- Volumes: 16
- icon

Katsu! (stylized in all caps) is a Japanese manga series written and illustrated by Mitsuru Adachi. It was serialized in Shogakukan's shōnen manga magazine Weekly Shōnen Sunday from August 2001 to February 2005, with its chapters collected in 16 tankōbon volumes. The story centers on freshman Katsuki Satoyama as he discovers his talent for boxing.

== Plot ==
Fifteen-year-olds Katsuki Satoyama and his best friend, Kyōta Kawakami, enroll in Mizutani Boxing Gym to get close to their tomboyish crush, Katsuki Mizutani, whose father owns the gym. However, Satoyama soon finds out that Mizutani is distant from her father. Even worse, she hates boxing. During a sparring match, Satoyama's hidden yet unpolished boxing skills are revealed. Satoyama learns that Mizutani loves boxing but disdains it because it is a sport for men, which she cannot participate in. Mizutani then decides to become Satoyama's trainer and manager to help him reach the championship belt. Satoyama agrees to this in order to be closer to her crush. Satoyama is the biological son of the late boxer Ryūsuke Akamatsu and was raised by former boxer "Rabbit" Sakaguchi—giving him the rare advantage of two fathers, one by blood and one by upbringing.

The rest of the story chronicles Satoyama's transformation from using boxing to impress Mizutani, to loving and embracing the sport completely, to becoming a professional boxer. Throughout this journey, he is helped by a slew of rivals who later become friends and well-wishers.

== Characters ==
Katsuki Satoyama (里山 活樹, Satoyama Katsuki)
A junior at Kōyō High School where he excels at Classical Chinese. His mother, Sachiko Satoyama (里山 佐知子, Satoyama Sachiko), died five years ago. He and his friend Kyōta join Mizutani Boxing Gym to get closer to Katsuki Mizutani, whose father owns the gym. His dodging ability stems from his sister's childhood habit of throwing objects at him. Though he believes he is a bantamweight, his home scale is off by three kilograms, making him a featherweight. His biological father, Ryūsuke Akamatsu (赤松 隆介, Akamatsu Ryūsuke), and adoptive father, Hachigorō Satoyama, employ contrasting boxing styles, both of which Katsuki incorporates into his own. He wins the inter-high school championships and the National Sports Festival twice each, plus one overall high school title, totaling five championships. He spars twice with Katsuki Mizutani and once with Shūsaku Nikaidō, defeats Shinichi Misaki twice in unofficial matches, and remains undefeated since turning professional after failing college entrance exams.
Katsuki Mizutani (水谷 香月, Mizutani Katsuki)
A classmate of Katsuki Satoyama. She possesses a strong personality and has single-handedly subdued groups of bullies and hoodlums multiple times, particularly during her youth while protecting Takamichi Kimoto. The daughter of Tsuyoshi and Harune Mizutani, who divorced several years ago, she initially expresses strong revulsion toward boxing but takes a special interest in training Satoyama after sparring with him. She is the object of affection for Satoyama, Kyōta Kawakami, Takamichi Kimoto, and Shinichi Misaki, and was childhood friends with Kimoto. She reciprocates Satoyama's feelings while disliking Misaki's stalking, and her rival for Satoyama is Riko Nanjo, who shares the same affection for him.
Kyōta Kawakami (川上 京太, Kawakami Kyōta)
Katsuki Satoyama's best friend in middle and high school. A talented boxer in his own right, who enjoys the sport and learns well at Mizutani Gym. He likes Katsuki Mizutani and initially joined the gym in order to get closer to her. Occasionally wants to test his strength against Katsuki Satoyama. He had a girlfriend who dumps him quickly.
Hachigorō Satoyama (里山 八五郎, Satoyama Hachigorō)
Father of Katsuki and Chiyaki Satoyama. He was a professional boxer known as "Rabbit" Sakaguchi (ラビット坂口, Rabitto Sakaguchi) but took his wife's surname upon marriage and retirement. His last bout was against Ryūsuke Akamatsu, Katsuki's biological father. Akamatsu died one month later from injuries sustained in the match. Feeling responsible for Akamatsu's death, he married Akamatsu's pregnant fiancée, Sachiko, in a shotgun wedding. He was maneuvered into coaching the Kōyō High School boxing club, where both Katsukis train. He is known for his defensive, point-scoring style, and his professional record stands at 12 wins, 0 losses, and 10 knockouts.
Tsuyoshi Mizutani (水谷 剛史, Mizutani Tsuyoshi)
The former Oriental champion and owner of Mizutani Gym. He is the father of Katsuki Mizutani and ex‑husband of Harune Mizutani. Given to drinking and violent outbursts, he remains deeply protective of his daughter. He holds a grudge against the professional boxer "Rabbit" Sakaguchi, who defeated him twice by disqualification. He favours a hard‑hitting, give‑and‑take boxing style.
Chiyaki Satoyama (里山 茶紀, Chiyaki Satoyama)
The younger sister of Katsuki Satoyama and daughter of Hachigorō Satoyama. She is clumsy and fond of throwing objects at people, a habit that inadvertently trains her household in evasion. Helpful and friendly, she occasionally teases her brother and admires the ace pitcher Shinichi Misaki.
Harune Mizutani (水谷 春音, Mizutani Harune)
The mother of Katsuki Mizutani, with whom she lives. She divorced her husband several years ago due to his drunkenness and violence. She runs an okonomiyaki restaurant occasionally visited by the Satoyama family. She despises boxers and refuses them service, and tells others she is a widow rather than divorced.
Takamichi Kimoto (紀本 高道, Kimoto Takamichi)
A childhood friend of Katsuki Mizutani. He was frequently bullied and came to admire her for defending him, though he later regretted that this made him appear as a tomboy. He took up boxing to defeat her and thereby reclaim the freedom to act like a girl, becoming highly skilled in the process. He harbours a crush on her and serves as Katsuki Satoyama's first major rival, representing the Asakura High Boxing Club.
Tadashi Sakura (佐久良 正, Sakura Tadashi)
One of the professional boxers who trains regularly at Mizutani Gym. He is a great admirer of "Rabbit" Sakaguchi and the one who revealed Sakaguchi's identity to Tsuyoshi Mizutani. An advocate of the defensive, point‑scoring style, he was also the first to give Katsuki Satoyama tips on proper boxing technique.
Shusaku Nikaido (二階堂 周作, Nikaidō Shūsaku)
A former boxer at Mizutani Gym. He was sent to juvenile detention for two years. He defeated Sakaguchi while still in middle school and now seeks a professional license. A former childhood friend of Katsuki Satoyama and a bully to Kyōta Kawakami, he also harbours feelings for Katsuki Mizutani.
Minori Hanzawa (半沢 みのり, Hanzawa Minori)
A former middle‑school classmate of Katsuki Satoyama and Kyōta Kawakami. She has a liking for Katsu and repeatedly tries to arrange dates with him. She views Katsuki Mizutani as a rival and considers her violent. Attending the same high school as Takamichi Kimoto, she provides Satoyama with valuable information about his boxing style.
Shinichi Misaki (岬 新一, Misaki Shin'ichi)
An ace baseball pitcher who reached Kōshien. He takes up boxing as a change of sport and to follow his idol's footsteps. Upon meeting Katsuki Mizutani, he falls for her and openly declares his feelings. A childhood friend of Jin Uchida, he is a gifted boxer and becomes Katsuki Satoyama's major rival. He and Jin greatly admired Ryūsuke Akamatsu as their childhood hero, and his boxing style, copied from watching Akamatsu on television, makes him a southpaw. He eventually abandons boxing and returns to baseball for money due to his family's financial difficulties.
Jin Uchida (内田 仁, Uchida Jin)
A young man who chose work and professional boxing training over high school. He trains at Kōei Gym, where "Rabbit" Sakaguchi previously trained. Dark and serious in appearance, he becomes extremely violent when provoked. A childhood friend of Shinichi Misaki, he is sent to jail and forced to abandon boxing after punching his father for sabotaging Misaki's family.
Tsuruta (鶴田)
The manager of Kōei Gym, where "Rabbit" Sakaguchi formerly trained and Jin Uchida currently trains, he is friendly and helpful toward both Katsukis due to his connection with Hachigorō Satoyama. He also knows the reason behind Sakaguchi's retirement.
Densuke Nanjo (南条 伝助, Nanjō Densuke)
Former manager of the Shoken Gym, where Ryūsuke Akamatsu trained. He runs a soba shop now. He has a granddaughter named Riko Nanjo.
Riko Nanjo (南条 理子, Nanjō Riko)
The granddaughter of the former manager of Shoken Gym. She has loved Ryūsuke Akamatsu since childhood. After seeing Katsuki Satoyama, she decides to seduce him into turning professional and marrying her, a plan that provokes great jealousy in Katsuki Mizutani. She intends to reopen Shoken Gym.

== Publication ==
Written and illustrated by Mitsuru Adachi, Katsu! was serialized in Shogakukan's shōnen manga magazine Weekly Shōnen Sunday from August 8, 2001, to February 16, 2005. (Note: It debuted in the magazine's 36th and 37th combined issue of 2001 (cover-dated August 22/29), released on August 8 of that same year.) Shogakukan collected its chapters in 16 tankōbon volumes, released from February 18, 2002, to April 18, 2005.

=== Volumes ===
No.	Japanese release date	Japanese ISBN
1	February 18, 2002	4-09-126301-1
2	March 18, 2002	4-09-126302-X
3	May 18, 2002	4-09-126303-8
4	August 9, 2002	4-09-126304-6
5	November 18, 2002	4-09-126305-4
6	January 18, 2003	4-09-126306-2
7	April 18, 2003	4-09-126307-0
8	July 18, 2003	4-09-126308-9
9	October 18, 2003	4-09-126309-7
10	December 18, 2003	4-09-126310-0
11	February 18, 2004	4-09-127041-7
12	April 17, 2004	4-09-127042-5
13	July 16, 2004	4-09-127043-3
14	October 18, 2004	4-09-127044-1
15	January 18, 2005	4-09-127045-X
16	April 18, 2005	4-09-127046-8

== Reception ==
Faustine Lillaz of Planete BD praised the story, characters, and artwork; Lillaz also praised the use of humor. A columnist for Manga News liked the story and characters. They described the artwork as "both very simple and very precise".
