= Tsutomu Adachi =

Japanese manga artist

Tsutomu Adachi あだち 勉
- Born: August 1, 1947; Isesaki, Gunma
- Died: June 18, 2004 (aged 56); Japan
- Occupation: Manga artist

Tsutomu Adachi (あだち 勉 or 安達 勉, Adachi Tsutomu; August 1, 1947 — June 18, 2004) was a Japanese manga artist born in Isesaki City, Gunma Prefecture, Japan, and the older brother of Mitsuru Adachi. Tsutomu was an assistant to Fujio Akatsuka, and was known as one of the "Four Protegés of Akatsuka". According to his younger brother, his definitive works include Jitsuroku Adachi Mitsuru Monogatari, Nigun no Hoshi Hanpa-kun (a gag comic serialized in the educational magazine Jūichi Course, published by Gakken) and Tamagawa-kun.

Tsutomu was very influential in creating the way for his younger brother, Mitsuru, to become a manga artist. He also described his younger brother as the "new star of the gag manga world." He made his manga debut while in his second year of high school. After moving to Tokyo, he won the 1st Shōnen Jump Rookie of the Year award in 1968. Mitsuru said that he would not be the person he is today if it were not for his brother, and that Tsutomu was the one who got him to leave his small hometown in Gunma Prefecture to see the world.

Adachi died of stomach cancer on June 18, 2004.

== Works ==
Cover of Jitsuroku Mitsuru Adachi Monogatari.

- Jitsuroku Adachi Mitsuru Monogatari (the story of his brother's rise to fame, Shogakukan)
- Nigun no Hoshi Hanpa-kun (Gakken)
- Tamagawa-kun
