= Slow Step =

1986 Japanese manga and 1991 OVA

- Volume 1 of Slow Step, featuring Minatsu Nakazato.

スローステップ (Surō Suteppu)
- Genre: Romance, sports
- Manga
- Written by: Mitsuru Adachi
- Published by: Shogakukan
- Magazine: Ciao
- Original run: September 1986 – March 1991
- Volumes: 7
- Original video animation
- Directed by: Kunihiko Yuyama
- Studio: Youmex
- Licensed by: UK: Western Connection
- Released: June 1, 1991 – November 1, 1991
- Episodes: 5

Slow Step (スローステップ, Surō Suteppu) is a romantic comedy boxing and softball manga by Mitsuru Adachi. It was serialized by Shogakukan in the shōjo manga magazine Ciao from September 1986 through March 1991, and collected in seven tankōbon volumes. In 1991, it was adapted as a five-episode OVA. The anime version has some differences from the manga, including the ending.

== Plot ==
Slow Step is a romantic comedy boxing and softball manga by Mitsuru Adachi. It follows Minatsu Nakazato, a popular high-school girl, as she deals with the unwanted romantic attentions of multiple boys and a teacher. Her plans for evading their pursuits of her grow increasingly convoluted, even involving taking on alternate identities.

== Characters ==
Minatsu Nakazato (中里 美夏, Nakazato Minatsu) / Maria Sudō (須藤 麻里亜, Sudō Maria)
Voiced by: Minami Takayama
A student at Asaoka High School and pitching ace for the softball club. She is the object of affection of both her classmate Shū Akiba and Coach Yamazakura. As her disguised alter ego Maria Sudō, she evades some local gangsters and is pursued by Naoto Kadomatsu, who lives in the same apartment building. Her father is a lesser-known pro wrestler. She tends to be curt and somewhat rough in her manners. In the anime, she falls for and marries Kango Yamazakura.
Shū Akiba (秋葉 習, Akiba Shū)
Voiced by: Kappei Yamaguchi
A boy in the same class as Minatsu and a member of the Asaoka High School boxing club. His father is a company president and he has a light-hearted, somewhat irresponsible personality. He is in love with Minatsu, and in rivalry with Naoto Kadomatsu joins the boxing club, working hard to try to beat him in order to win Minatsu's affection.
Naoto Kadomatsu (門松 直人, Kadomatsu Naoto)
Voiced by: Ryō Horikawa
A third-year student at Jōsei High School and a member of its boxing club. He lives in the same apartment building as Minatsu but attends a different school, in a different grade. He is a high school boxing champion. He falls in love at first sight with Minatsu's alter ego Maria, and becomes Shū's rival in boxing and in trying to win Minatsu's affections after learning that Maria and Minatsu are the same person.
Kango Yamazakura (山桜監悟, Yamazakura Kango)
Voiced by: Akira Kamiya
A teacher at Asaoka High School and advisor to both the softball and boxing clubs. While in college, he worked toward becoming a professional boxer but gave up this dream after his sister died in order to take care of his sister's daughter, Chika. He has a preoccupation with the female behind, and frequently gives unwanted attention to female students at the school. At the end of the anime series, he and Minatsu are married.
Ayako Sawamura (沢村 亜矢子, Sawamura Ayako)
Voiced by: Hiroko Emori
A rough, aloof girl who is the only person who can catch Minatsu's pitching. She has a crush on Coach Yamazakura, and manages to date him by agreeing to join the softball club. After she is rejected by Yamazakura, she takes a hiatus from softball but soon returns for the team rather than for Yamazakura. She ends up with new teacher, Somei, who falls for her once she finds out that she is one of the only women who he is not deathly afraid of other than his mother.
Chika Tanaka (田中知香, Tanaka Chika)
Voiced by: Chika Sakamoto
Yamazakura's orphaned niece. Even though she's an elementary school student, she is very reliable and cooks nearly every meal for Yamazakura. She really likes Minatsu and hopes she and Yamazakura get together eventually.

== Releases ==
=== Manga ===
Slow Step was serialized by Shogakukan in the shōjo manga magazine Ciao from September 1986 through March 1991, and collected in seven tankōbon volumes.

Tankōbon

- Volume 1 (20 May 1987, Flower Comics, Shogakukan, ISBN 4-09-132521-1)
- Volume 2 (20 December 1987, Flower Comics, Shogakukan, ISBN 4-09-132522-X)
- Volume 3 (20 October 1988, Flower Comics, Shogakukan, ISBN 4-09-132523-8)
- Volume 4 (20 May 1989, Flower Comics, Shogakukan, ISBN 4-09-132524-6)
- Volume 5 (20 April 1990, Flower Comics, Shogakukan, ISBN 4-09-132525-4)
- Volume 6 (20 November 1990, Flower Comics, Shogakukan, ISBN 4-09-132526-2)
- Volume 7 (20 August 1991, Flower Comics, Shogakukan, ISBN 4-09-132527-0)

Bunkoban

- Volume 1 (August 1995, Shogakukan, ISBN 4-09-191061-0)
- Volume 2 (August 1995, Shogakukan, ISBN 4-09-191062-9)
- Volume 3 (August 1995, Shogakukan, ISBN 4-09-191063-7)
- Volume 4 (August 1995, Shogakukan, ISBN 4-09-191064-5)

=== Anime ===
In 1991, Slow Step was adapted into a five-episode OVA series by Youmex and distributed on by Toho. The anime version has some differences from the manga, including the ending. It was released on five VHS tapes and five laserdiscs.

The series was directed by Kunihiko Yuyama, with scripts by Toshimichi Saeki and character designs by Tokuhiro Matsubara. The soundtrack was by Hiroya Watanabe.

#	Storyboards	Director	Animation director	Release date
1	Kunihiko Yuyama		Norihiro Matsubara	June 1, 1991
2	Takaya Mizutani		Yoshihiro Owada	July 1, 1991
3	Kunihiko Yuyama		Masami Suda	August 1, 1991
4	Kunihiko Yuyama	Masamune Ochiai		September 1, 1991
5	Kunihiko Yuyama		Norihiro Matsubara	November 1, 1991

==== Songs ====
The opening theme song for Slow Step was "Kimi ga Inakerya Frustration" (君がいなけりゃFRUSTRATION, Kimi ga Inakerya Furasutoreishon), with vocals by Nobuhide Saki, who also composed the song. The lyrics were written by Gorō Matsui, and the music was arranged by Takeshi Fujii and Yoshiyuki Sahashi. The ending theme, "Only for You", was composed and was sung by Saki. Matsui wrote the lyrics and the music was arranged by Fujii and Sahashi.

=== Soundtrack ===
A soundtrack CD (TYCY-5157) was released on 27 March 1991.

1. Kimi ga Inakerya Frustration (君がいなけりゃFRUSTRATION, Kimi ga Inakerya Furasutoreishon)
2. Asaoka High School (麻丘高校, Asaoka Kōkō)
3. Furyō Shōjo ni wa Narenakute (不良少女にはなれなくて)
4. Butainu Bōsōzoku (ぶたいぬ暴走族)
5. Ki ni Naru Aitsu (気になるあいつ)
6. Zensokuryoku no I Love You (全速力の I Love You)
7. Ninshīn! (にんしーん!)
8. Date o Kaketa Taiketsu (デートを賭けた対決)
9. Chika-chan no Katei (知香ちゃんの家庭)
10. Satsujinki Semaru!! (殺人鬼迫る!!)
11. Yayakoshii Shiai (ややこしい試合)
12. Kaze no Yokan (風の予感)
13. Kadomatsu e no KO Punch (門松へのKOパンチ)
14. Moshikashite...? (もしかして...?)
15. Nonki na Renshū (のんきな練習)
16. Kimi ga Kureta Rakugaki (君がくれた落書き)
17. Maria ni Kokuhaku (麻里亜に告白)
18. Tokubetsu na Hito (特別な男性(ひと))
19. Porsche ni Notta Irootoko (ポルシェに乗った色男)
20. Only for You

== Reception ==
In 1995 Slow Step was released in the United Kingdom on VHS with English subtitles by the video company Western Connection. However, it was commercially unsuccessful.

Helen McCarthy in 500 Essential Anime Movies calls Mitsuru Adachi "the king of high school romance" and states that the anime "deserves a much bigger audience."

== Works cited ==
- McCarthy, Helen (2009). 500 Essential Anime Movies: The Ultimate Guide. Harper Design. p. 322. ISBN 978-0061474507.
