= Weekly Young Sunday =

Japanese manga magazine

- Cover of issue 36/37 of 2006, featuring Ayaka Komatsu
- Categories: Seinen manga
- Frequency: Weekly
- First issue: March 27, 1987
- Final issue: July 31, 2008
- Company: Shogakukan
- Country: Japan
- Language: Japanese
- Website: Official website (archived)

Weekly Young Sunday (Japanese: 週刊ヤングサンデー, Hepburn: Shūkan Yangu Sandē) was a weekly seinen manga magazine published by Shogakukan in Japan since the first issue on March 27, 1987. It replaced Shōnen Big Comic in Shogakukan's lineup of shōnen titles, and many of the titles in Shōnen Big Comic were continued in Young Sunday. The magazines was sometimes called Yansan (ヤンサン) for short.

To celebrate the 20th anniversary of Weekly Young Sunday, Shogakukan and Yahoo! Auctions Japan held a charity auction benefitting the Green Cross Japan. Various manga artists donated signed original artwork, and Shogakukan donated rare goods related to the series and people appearing in the magazine.

On May 30, 2008, Shogakukan announced that they would cease publication of the magazine. The final issue was released on July 31, 2008. Its gravure idol online service, Young Sunday Visual Web (ヤングサンデービジュアルウェブ), renamed to Visual Web S (ビジュアルウェブS) following the magazine's discontinuation, continued to operate from the Young Sunday domain until September 30, 2021, thirteen years after the namesake magazine ended publication.

== Ongoing titles in the final issue ==
- Aoi Honō, by Kazuhiko Shimamoto (not in every issue, began issue 14 in 2007)
- Ankoro by Daichi Banjou
- Beach Stars by Masahiro Morio
- Birdy the Mighty, by Masami Yuki (began issue 4/5 in 2003)
- Chō Mukiryoku Sentai Japa-Five by Masaki Satō
- Cut: Katsuhito, by Tomomi Muronaga (began issue 16 in 2007)
- Drive Alive by Kunihiko Nakai
- Dr. Kotō Shinryōjo, by Takatoshi Yamada (began issue 29 in 2000)
- Go-On! by Manabu Akisige
- Hana no Miyako by Takashi Kondō
- Idol Ace, by Mitsuru Adachi (not in every issue, began issue 36/37 in 2005)
- Ikigami: The Ultimate Limit, by Motorō Mase (began issue 9 in 2005)
- Kurosagi, by Kuromaru (created by Takeshi Tatsuhara, began issue 50 in 2003)
- Lost Man by Michiteru Kusaba
- Ma Q Ken by Masahiko Kikuni
- Miharu Rising by Miku Simai
- Mogura no Uta by Noburu Takahashi
- Odds, by Osamu Ishiwata (began issue 14 in 2006)
- Oyasumi Punpun, by Inio Asano (began issue 15 in 2007)
- Rainbow: Nisha Rokubō no Shichinin by George Abe and Masasumi Kakizaki (began in 2001)
- Sakuranbo Syndrome: Kupido no Itazura Nijidama II, by Taku Kitazaki (began issue 34 in 2006)
- Shin Seishun-kun, by Yasutaka Togashi (began issue 1 in 2007)
- Thanatos: Mushikera no Ken, by Shinji Takehara (writer) and Yūsuke Ochiai (artist) (began issue 1 in 2007)
- Tōbō Bengoshi Narita Makoto by Yū Takada and Shiro Takahide
- Tomehane! Suzuri Kōkō Shodōbu by Katsutoshi Kawai (began in 2007)
- Toritsu Mizusho! by Hikaru Murozumi and Shinobu Inokuma
- Yami no Aegis by Kyoichi Nanatsuki and Yoshihide Fujiwara
- Zetsubō ni Kiku Kusuri, by Reiji Yamada (began issue 38 in 2003)

== YS Special ==
Of the series that were running in the magazine at the time of its cancellation, Birdy the Mighty, Ikigami The Ultimate Limit, Kurosagi, Lost Man, Mogura no Uta, Oyasumi Punpun, Rainbow Nisha Rokubō no Shichinin, and Tomehane! Suzuri Kōkō Shodōbu all moved to Big Comic Spirits. Big Comic Spirits itself began releasing a special supplementary issue entitled YS Special. The magazine's first issue debuted September 28, 2008, and allowed for the twelve remaining series running in Young Sunday at the time of its cancellation to conclude their storylines.

Of those twelve series, Chō Mukiryoku Sentai Japa-Five, Hana no Miyako, and Miharu Rising all ended in the third issue. Thanatos: Mushikera no Ken and Beach Stars ended in the fourth issue. The final seven; Sakuranbo Syndrome: Kupido no Itazura Nijidama II, The School of Water Business, Odds, Drive Alive, Go-On!, Ankoro, and Yami no Aegis all concluded in the final issue published in January 2009.

== Concluded titles ==
These titles have concluded their runs in Weekly Young Sunday.

- Angel, by U-Jin
- Bakune Young, by Toyokazu Matsunaga
- BUGS: Summer of Predators, by Kyoichi Nanatsuki & Yoshihide Fujiwara (2006–2007)
- Captain Donkabe, by Hiroto Oishi
- Cupid no Itazura Nijidama, by Taku Kitazaki
- Fighting Beauty Wulong, by Yūgo Ishikawa
- Heartbroken Angels by Masahiko Kikuni
- Hikari no Sora, by Eiji Kazama
- Hoshi no Furumachi, by Hidenori Hara
- Ichi the Killer, by Hideo Yamamoto (May 1998 through 2001)
- Irasshāse, by Yūsuke Yoshida (began issue 21/22 in 2004)
- Jimuin A-ko, by Hiroyuki Nishimori (began issue 14 in 2006)
- Kakeru, by Kenjirō Takeshita (1997-?)
- Karen Jogakiun Kōkō Danshi Kendōbu, by Kenji Morita (began issue 13 in 2007)
- Lycanthrope Leo, by Kengo Kaji and Kenji Okamura
- Odawara Dragon Quest!, by Dragon Odawara (began issue 7/8 in 2003)
- O~i! Ryoma, by Yū Koyama and Tetsuya Takeda (1986–1996)
- Okama Report, by Hideo Yamamoto
- One-Pound Gospel, by Rumiko Takahashi (not in every issue, March 1987 - January 2007)
- Over Rev!, by Katsumi Yamaguchi (1997–2004)
- Portus, by Jun Abe
- Sakura Diaries by U-Jin (1995–2000)
- Seishun-kun, by Yasutaka Togashi (1989-?)
- Sex, by Atsushi Kamijo (1988–1992)
- Shimokita Glory Days, by Jiro Otani
- Short Cuts, by Usamaru Furuya (1996–1999)
- Short Program (various short stories), by Mitsuru Adachi (1987–1995)
- Solanin by Inio Asano (2005–2006)
- Tell Me A Lie, by Gosho Aoyama (2007)
- TVO by Ochazukenori (1989–1990)
- Kennel Tokorozawa by Maki Ootsubo (1989-1992)
- Voyeur by Hideo Yamamoto (1992)
- Voyeurs, Inc. by Hideo Yamamoto (1993–1996)
