= Mitsuru Adachi =

Japanese manga artist (born 1951)

Mitsuru Adachi あだち充
- Born: 安達 充 February 9, 1951 (age 75); Isesaki, Gunma, Japan
- Education: Assistant to Shinji Nagashima; Assistant to Isami Ishii
- Notable work: Nine; Touch; Rough; H2; Katsu! Cross Game; Mix
- Awards: Shogakukan Manga Award (1982, 2008)

Mitsuru Adachi (Japanese: あだち 充 or 安達 充, Hepburn: Adachi Mitsuru; born February 9, 1951) is a Japanese manga artist. After graduating from Gunma Prefectural Maebashi Commercial High School in 1969, Adachi worked as an assistant for Isami Ishii. He made his manga debut in 1970 with Kieta Bakuon, based on a manga originally created by Satoru Ozawa. Kieta was published in Deluxe Shōnen Sunday (a manga magazine published by Shogakukan).

Adachi is well known for romantic comedy and sports manga (especially baseball) such as Touch, H2, Slow Step, Miyuki and Cross Game. He has been described as a writer of "delightful dialogue", a genius at portraying everyday life, "the greatest pure storyteller", and "a master manga artist". He is one of the few manga artists to write for shōnen, shōjo and seinen manga magazines, and be popular in all three.

His works have been carried in manga magazines such as Weekly Shōnen Sunday, Ciao, Shōjo Comic, Big Comic and Petit Comic, and most of his works are published through Shogakukan and Gakken. He was one of the flagship authors in the new Monthly Shōnen Sunday magazine which began publication in June 2009. Two short story collections, Short Program and Short Program 2 (both through Viz Media), have been released in North America, and Viz Media scheduled to begin publishing Cross Game in October 2010. The first volume was released on October 12.

He modeled the spelling of あだち (rather than 安達) for his family name after the example of his older brother, manga artist Tsutomu Adachi. In addition, it has been suggested that the accurate portrayal of sibling rivalry in Touch may come from Adachi's experiences while growing up with his older brother. Adachi did the character designs for the OVA anime series Nozomi Witches, so he is sometimes incorrectly given credit for creating the original series.

== Brief history ==
Prior to 1969, Adachi began submitting works to the manga magazine COM. In 1969, he followed his older brother's lead and moved to Tokyo to begin work as an assistant to manga artist Isami Ishii. The following year, he made his professional debut with Kieta Bakuon. He continued publishing various short stories and shorter series throughout the 1970s based on works created by others, the most well known being his adaptation of Rainbowman from 1972 to 1973. In 1978, he published his first original series, Nine, in Weekly Shōnen Sunday. He published two other original series, Hiatari Ryōkō! from 1979 to 1981 in Weekly Shōjo Comic, and Miyuki from 1980 to 1984 in Shōnen Big Comic.

Adachi became a household name with the publication of his series Touch from 1981 to 1986 in Weekly Shōnen Sunday. In 1982, Hiatari Ryōkō! was adapted into a live action TV drama series. The following year, 1983, was a big year for Adachi. He received the 28th Annual Shogakukan Manga Award for shōnen/shōjo manga his two series Touch and Miyuki. His Miyuki series was adapted into both an anime television series and a live-action film and Nine was adapted into three films, with another following in 1984.

Touch was adapted into an anime television series in 1985 and the series ran for two years on Fuji TV. Adachi's romantic shōjo manga series, Slow Step, was serialized in Ciao from 1986 to 1991 and another romantic comedy series, Rough, appeared in Weekly Shōnen Sunday from 1987 to 1989. Adachi then released Niji Iro Tōgarashi, a fantasy medieval romantic comedy manga series, from 1990 to 1992 in Weekly Shōnen Sunday.

Jinbē, a romantic comedy about the relationship between a stepfather and stepdaughter, was serialized in Big Comic Original from 1992 to 1997. Adachi's longest manga series, H2 was serialized in Weekly Shōnen Sunday from 1992 to 1999 and compiled in 34 volumes. This manga was adapted into an anime television series which aired on TV Asahi from 1995 to 1996.

From 2000 to 2001, Adachi published a fantasy romantic comedy series in Weekly Shōnen Sunday titled Itsumo Misora. His next longer series was the boxing romantic comedy, Katsu!, published from 2001 to 2005 in Weekly Shōnen Sunday. In 2005, H2 was adapted into a live action drama series aired on TBS in Japan, and Touch was adapted into a live action movie released by Toho. He also began his manga series Cross Game, serialized in Weekly Shōnen Sunday. The following year, Rough was adapted into a live action movie, also released by Toho.

Due to achieving total manga sales numbering over 200 million volumes, Weekly Shōnen Sunday devoted issue 26 in 2008 to Adachi and his works. In 2009, Adachi won the 54th Annual Shogakukan Manga Award for shōnen manga for Cross Game, which was adapted into an anime television series which began airing on TV Tokyo in April 2009.

Adachi began Q and A in the inaugural issue of Monthly Shōnen Sunday in June 2009. Asaoka High School Baseball Club Diary: Over Fence began in the April 27, 2011, issue of Weekly Shōnen Sunday. In May 2012 he finished Q and A and began his new series, Mix, a semi-sequel to Touch set 30 years later, in the June 2012 issue of Monthly Shōnen Sunday. Currently, Adachi's works have sold over 200 million copies.

== Works ==
=== Original ===
These are original series created by Adachi.

| Years | Name | Total number of volumes | Anthology |
|---|---|---|---|
| 1978–1980 | Nine | 5 | Shōnen Sunday Super |
| 1979–1980 | Oira Hōkago Wakadaishō | 2 | Chūichi Course |
| 1980–1981 | Hiatari Ryōkō! | 5 | Shōjo Comic |
| 1980–1984 | Miyuki | 12 | Shōnen Big Comic |
| 1981–1986 | Touch | 26 | Weekly Shōnen Sunday |
| 1986–1991 | Slow Step | 7 | Ciao |
| 1987–1989 | Rough | 12 | Weekly Shōnen Sunday |
| 1990–1992 | Niji-iro Tohgarashi | 11 | Weekly Shōnen Sunday |
| 1992–1997 | Jinbē | 1 | Big Comic Original |
| 1992–1999 | H2 | 34 | Weekly Shōnen Sunday |
| 1998–2005 | Bōken Shōnen | 1 | Big Comic Original |
| 2000–2001 | Itsumo Misora | 5 | Weekly Shōnen Sunday |
| 2001–2005 | Katsu! | 16 | Weekly Shōnen Sunday |
| 2005–2010 | Cross Game | 17 | Weekly Shōnen Sunday |
| 2005–2007; 2010–2011 | Idol Ace | 1 | Weekly Young Sunday, Monthly Shōnen Sunday |
| 2009–2012 | Q and A | 6 | Monthly Shōnen Sunday |
| 2012–present | Mix | 25+ | Monthly Shōnen Sunday |

=== Short works ===
Many of Adachi's short works have been collected in Short Program, an anthology series with four volumes.

- Ruthless Trap (無情の罠, Mujō no Wana) (March 1971, Deluxe Shōnen Sunday)
- The Foghorn Sounded (裂けた霧笛, Saketa Muteki) (1971, summer vacation issue, Weekly Shōnen Sunday, originally created by Hisao Maki)
- Fresh Blood of the Final Round (鮮血の最後ラウンド, Senketsu no Saigo Raundo) (November 1973, Bessatsu Shōnen Sunday, originally created by Tomoaki Inoue)
- Dream Slugger (まぼろしの強打者, Maboroshi no Kyōdasha) (February 1974, Bessatsu Shōnen Sunday, originally created by Kōta Seki)
- A Blow for That Girl! (あの娘に一本!, Ano Musume ni Ippon!) (1975 issue 4/5, Weekly Shōjo Comic)
- Ace of Hearts (ハートのA, Hāto no Ēsu) (1975 issues 33–38, Weekly Shōjo Comic, originally created by Akira Saiga)
- Whimsical Punch (きまぐれパンチ, Kimagure Panchi) (1977 issue 34, Weekly Shōjo Comic)
- A Word from the Freeloader (居候よりひとこと, Isōrō yori Hitokoto) (1978 issue 11, Weekly Shōjo Comic)
- Pair of Aces (エースふたり, Ēsu Futari) (1978 issue 16, Weekly Shōjo Comic)
- Wind in the Green Leaves (青葉に風, Aoba ni Kaze) (1978 issue 20, Weekly Shōjo Comic)
- Ken (ケン) (1978 issue 28, Weekly Shōjo Comic)
- The Youthful Path (青春一直線, Seishun Itchokusen) (1978 issue 37, Weekly Shōjo Comic)
- Teens (ティーンズ, Tīnzu) (1978, issue 42, Weekly Shōjo Comic)
- What's Going On? (なにがなんだか, Nani ga Nanda ka) (1985 issues 1–2, Shōnen Big Comic)
- Purple (むらさき, Murasaki) (June 1985, Ciao)
- Change (チェンジ, Chenji) (October 1985 special issue, Weekly Shōnen Sunday)
- At the Intersection (交差点前, Kōsaten Mae) (1986 issue 4, Shōnen Big Comic)
- Plus 1 (プラス1, Purasu Wan) (June 1986, Ciao)
- The Current State of Affairs (近況, Kinkyō) (January 1987, Shōnen Big Comic)
- Short Program (ショートプログラム, Shōto Puroguramu) (1987 special issue, Young Sunday)
- Take Off (テイク・オフ, Teiku Ofu) (1988 issue 7, Young Sunday)
- 4 on the Richter Scale (震度4, Shindo Yon) (1988 issue 27, Weekly Shōnen Sunday)
- The Road Home (帰り道, Kaeri Michi) (1989 issues 20–21, Young Sunday)
- Square Sea (四角い海, Shikakui Umi) (1998 30th Anniversary Special Issue, Weekly Shōnen Sunday)
- Sayonara Game (さよならゲーム, Sayonara Gēmu) (Spring Special Issue 1991, Big Comic)
- Before Spring Comes... (春がくる前に..., Haru ga Kuru Mae ni...) (April 1992, Petit Comic)
- Blowing Any Which Way (どこ吹く風, Doko Fuku Kaze) (1992 issue 8, Big Comic Spirits)
- 5x4P (1992 issues 14–18, Big Comic Superior)
- Aim at the Ace! (エースをつぶせ!, Ēsu o Tsubuse!) (October–November 1992, Elementary 4th Graders)
- Spring Call (スプリング・コール, Supuringu Kōru) (1993 issue 15, Weekly Shōnen Sunday)
- Spring Passes (ゆく春, Yuku Haru) (1993 issue 17, Big Comic Spirits)
- A Stop on the Way (途中下車, Tochū Gesha) (1994 issue 36, Weekly Shōnen Sunday)
- Target Wakaba (若葉マーク, Wakaba Māku) (1995 issue 1, Young Sunday)
- Angel's Hammer (天使のハンマー, Tenshi no Hanmā) (1998 issue 6, Big Comic)
- Geta and Diamonds (下駄とダイヤモンド, Geta to Daiyamondo) (1999 issue 17, Young Sunday)
- Memory Off (メモリーオフ, Memorī Ofu) (2000 issues 6–7, Weekly Shōnen Sunday)
- White Summer (白い夏, Shiroi Natsu) (2002 issues 36–37, Weekly Shōnen Sunday, originally created by Buronson)
- The Runaway God (逃げた神様, Nigeta Kamisama) (October 16, 2005, issue, Big Comic One)
- Short Mail (ショートメール, Shōto Mēru) (2006 Special Winter Issue, Shōnen Sunday Super)
- A Word from the Freeloader, Continued (続・居候よりひとこと, Shoku Isōrō yori Hitokoto) (??)
- It's Hard Being a Freeloader (居候はつらいよ, Isōrō wa Tsurai yo) (??)
- Lovers Declaration (恋人宣言, Koibito Sengen) (??)
- Season (??)
- Asaoka High School Baseball Club Diary: Over Fence (2011, Weekly Shōnen Sunday)

=== Series ===
==== Adaptations ====
These series were based on works originally created by another author or artist.

| Years | Name | Total number of volumes | Anthology | Original creator | Japanese publisher |
|---|---|---|---|---|---|
| October 1972 - October 1973 | Warrior of Love Rainbowman (愛の戦士レインボーマン, Ai no Senshi Reinbōman) | 4 | TV Magazine | Kōhan Kawauchi | Kodansha |
| 1974, issues 28–47 | Little Boy (リトル・ボーイ) | | Weekly Shōnen Sunday | Mamoru Sasaki | Shōgakukan |
| September 1974 - March 1975 | Hey Ganta (おらあガン太だ, Orāgantada) | | TV Land | Mamoru Sasaki | Tokuma Shoten |
| 1975, issues 2-34 | Fang Match (牙戦, Kibasen) | | Weekly Shōnen Sunday | Kai Takizawa | Shōgakukan |
| April 1975 - March 1976 | Hirahira-kun Youthful Duty (ヒラヒラくん青春仁義, Hirahira-kun Seishun Jingi) | | Chūichi Course | Mamoru Sasaki | Gakken |
| May 1976, issues 5/6-18 | Gamushara (がむしゃら) | | Weekly Shōnen Sunday | Jūzō Yamasaki | Shōgakukan |
| April 1976 – March 1977 | Hirahira-kun Youthful Tone (ヒラヒラくん青春音頭, Hirahira-kun Seishun Ondo) | | Chūichi Course | Mamoru Sasaki | Gakken |
| April 1976 – March 1977 | Soul of Kōshien (甲子園魂, Kōshien Tamashī) | | Weekly Power Comic | Mamoru Sasaki | Futabasha |
| 1976, issues 34–51 | First Love Kōshien (初恋甲子園, Hatsukoi Kōshien) | | Weekly Shōjo Comic | Jūzō Yamasaki | Shōgakukan |
| 1977, issues 15–46 | Crybaby Kōshien (泣き虫甲子園, Nakimushi Kōshien) | | Weekly Shōjo Comic | Jūzō Yamasaki | Shōgakukan |
| April 1977 – March 1978 | Hirahira-kun Youthful Drumbeat (ヒラヒラくん青春太鼓, Hirahira-kun Seishun Taiko) | | Weekly Shōjo Comic | Mamoru Sasaki | Shōgakukan |
| April 1978 – March 1979 | Let's Play Baseball!! (おひけェなすって!野球仁義, O Hike ~e Nasutte! Yakyū Jingi) | | Chūichi Course | Mamoru Sasaki | Gakken |
| 1979, issues 8–19 | Rise, Setting Sun!! (夕陽よ昇れ!!, Sekiyō yo Nobore!!) | | Weekly Shōjo Comic | Jūzō Yamasaki | Shōgakukan |

=== Other ===
- Legendary Girls Calendar (1992, Petit Comics)

== Related people ==
Tsutomu Adachi
Mitsuru's older brother was a manga artist and an assistant to Fujio Akatsuka. He died of stomach cancer in 2004. In 1982, he authored Mitsuru Adachi Monogatari, a manga detailing the early life of Mitsuru as a rookie manga artist.
Shinji Nagashima
Adachi became a fan of Nagashima around the age of 10, and began tracing his works. He became an assistant to Nagashima for a short time after graduating from high school. However, Nagashima suddenly moved overseas, so he then became an assistant to Isami Ishii. In the October 16, 2005, issue of Big Comic, Adachi published a short work titled The Runaway God which was meant as a memorialization of Nagashima.
Rumiko Takahashi
From the early 1980s, both Adachi and Takahashi were popular authors in Weekly Shōnen Sunday and they formed a friendly rivalry. He even commented about how he had a lot to live up to with how popular Takahashi was, especially with it being a shōnen magazine. Several times a year they would meet, to share their thoughts and ideas with each other. At the end of Weekly Shōnen Sunday issue 43 in 2006, the authors were asked, "If you could pick one penname to use which was different than your own, which one would you pick?", and Takahashi replied, "Adachi Mitsuru."
Kazuhiko Shimamoto
Shimamoto and Adachi are mutual fans of each others' works. The main character in his Blazing Transfer Student manga series, Noboru Takizawa, made a guest appearance in Touch.
Mr. Pogo
Pogo and Adachi graduated in the same class and have spoken about this in various magazine interviews. The character Kōtarō Matsudaira from Touch is modeled after Pogo.
