= Itsumo Misora =

Japanese manga series

- First volume cover

いつも美空
- Manga
- Written by: Mitsuru Adachi
- Published by: Shogakukan
- Imprint: Shōnen Sunday Comics
- Magazine: Weekly Shōnen Sunday
- Original run: May 10, 2000 – May 30, 2001
- Volumes: 5

Itsumo Misora (Japanese: いつも美空; lit. 'Always Misora') is a Japanese manga series written and illustrated by Mitsuru Adachi. It was serialized in Shogakukan's Weekly Shōnen Sunday from May 2000 to May 2001, with its chapters collected in five tankōbon volumes. The story revolves around six children and a cat who save a religious icon from a fire at a temple, in reward for which the temple god grants each of them a power that activates on their 13th birthdays. Upon entering junior high school together, the six are forced to join the Sports Rental Club, which provides temporary members to other clubs when regular members cannot participate for some reason.

== Characters ==
Misora Sakajō (坂上 美空, Sakajō Misora)
The oldest of the six children. She is given telekinesis by the temple god and, as the first to turn thirteen, is the first to learn about her gift. Misora is the daughter of an almost-famous movie star who died shortly after playing his first role in a movie.
She plans to be the first Japanese woman to win an Academy Award for Best Female in a Leading Role ("Best Actress"). Misora is a gifted all-around athlete: in a softball game, she managed to adapt her pitching to the skill of the opposing pitcher by mimicking her for four innings. She thinks Miyako is her rival, though Miyako does not return the feeling. As the series progress, they seem to become friends. She is good friends with Jūshirō and Ryūdō.
Kōta Kitajima (北島 光太, Kitajima Kōta)
One of the six children. He is given the ability to instantly transport himself. While playing in sandlot games, Kōta is compared to the hot-blooded Senichi Hoshino, manager of the Chunichi Dragons baseball team at the time of the story. His grandfather is a famous movie director. Miyako, Chiyonosuke, and he are good friends. As the series progress, he develops feelings for Misora.
Ryūdō Mihashi (三橋 竜堂, Mihashi Ryūdō)
One of the six children. He is given the ability to see, by looking at a person's palm, who they will marry either three or six years in the future. While he has been Misora's friend since childhood and wants to become more than friends, Misora does not seem to notice him in a romantic way. Ryūdō is good friends with Misora and Jūshirō. He does not like Kōta and is constantly trying to outdo him, though Kōta does not seem to notice.
Miyako Kokubo (小久保 都, Kokubo Miyako)
The second oldest of the six children. She is given precognition. Miyako has better motor reflexes than Misora. Her older sister teaches at the school they all attend. She is good friends with Chiyonosuke and Kōta.
Chiyonosuke Kasuga (春日 千代之介, Kasuga Chiyonosuke)
One of the six children. Chiyonosuke is given the power to find a route to anywhere. He is good friends with Miyako and Kōta.
Jūshirō Murata (村田 十四郎, Murata Jūshirō)
One of the six children. A childhood friend of Misora, and good friends with her and Ryūdō. He is given the divine power of detecting metal objects. However, while wandering around on a sandy beach for two hours, he was able to find only ¥280 (about US$2.50). While he can detect different types of metals, he does not understand what the types are and so is not very good at using this part of his power.
Bake (バケ)
Bake was originally a stray cat, but became attached to Misora, becoming her pet. The temple god gave him the ability to speak Japanese and act human when he turned 13 years old. Bake is a heavy smoker.

== Publication ==
Itsumo Misora is written and illustrated by Mitsuru Adachi. It was serialized in Shogakukan's Weekly Shōnen Sunday from May 10, 2000, to May 30, 2001. Shogakukan collected its chapters in five tankōbon volumes, released from September 18, 2000, to July 18, 2001.

=== Volumes ===
No.	Japanese release date	Japanese ISBN
1	September 18, 2000	4-09-126071-3
2	December 18, 2000	4-09-126072-1
3	March 17, 2001	4-09-126073-X
4	May 18, 2001	4-09-126074-8
5	July 18, 2001	4-09-126075-6
