= Miyuki (manga) =

1983 Japanese manga series by Mitsuru Adachi

- Cover of the first volume

みゆき
- Manga
- Written by: Mitsuru Adachi
- Published by: Shogakukan
- Magazine: Shōnen Big Comic
- Original run: 1980 – 1984
- Volumes: 12
- Anime television series
- Directed by: Mizuho Nishikubo (Note: Credited as Chief Director (チーフディレクター))
- Produced by: Tomoyuki Miyata; Tadashi Oka (Note: Credited as Fuji TV Producer (フジテレビプロデューサー))
- Written by: Shigeru Yanagawa
- Music by: Fumitaka Anzai; Masamichi Amano; Lion Merry
- Studio: Kitty Film Mitaka Studio
- Original network: FNS (Fuji TV)
- Original run: March 31, 1983 – April 20, 1984
- Episodes: 37
- Anime television film
- Directed by: Kazuyuki Izutsu
- Produced by: Tomohiro Iji
- Music by: Keiichi Oku; Mitsuo Hagita
- Studio: Kitty Film Mitaka Studio
- Released: September 16, 1983
- Runtime: 97 minutes
- Television drama
- Directed by: Setsurō Wakamatsu
- Produced by: Taihei Ishikawa; Setsurō Wakamatsu; Shinsuke Tani
- Studio: Fuji TV; Kyodo Television
- Original network: Fuji TV
- Original run: August 4, 1986

Miyuki (Japanese: みゆき) is a Japanese manga series written and illustrated by Mitsuru Adachi. It was published by Shogakukan from 1980 to 1984 in the biweekly manga magazine Shōnen Big Comic (precursor to the current Weekly Young Sunday). The series was adapted into a film, an anime television series, and a live-action television drama. It was very popular in Japan and was one of the winners of the 1982 Shogakukan Manga Award for shōnen and shōjo manga, along with Adachi's Touch manga.

Miyuki was Adachi's first manga adapted as an anime. The 37-episode anime series was broadcast from March 31, 1983, until April 20, 1984, on the Fuji Television network. The live-action film version was released on September 16, 1983. The television drama, produced by Fuji TV and Kyodo Television (a television production house), aired on August 4, 1986. The anime has been dubbed into several other languages including French and Spanish.

== Plot ==
Masato Wakamatsu, 16 years old, is working at the beach one summer. Having made a bad impression on his classmate/crush Miyuki Kashima, he makes a pass at another pretty girl. To Masato's shock, the girl turns out to be his younger stepsister Miyuki (15), who has been living abroad with their father for the past six years.

As school progresses, Masato starts dating Miyuki Kashima. He and his sister Miyuki are living alone together, and he is troubled by his conflicting emotions: filial and romantic feelings toward a sister who may or may not know she is not related to him by blood.

== Characters ==
Masato Wakamatsu (若松 真人, Wakamatsu Masato)
Voiced by: Katsumi Toriumi (Anime television series), Portrayed by Masatoshi Nagase (movie)
An average high school student (later a rōnin for a year, then a college student). His mother died when he was young, and his step-mother also died when he was young, and he still misses both of them. Masato really likes Miyuki Kashima, the most popular girl in class, but keeps messing up whenever he tries to talk to her or ask her out on a date. Just before high school begins, his younger sister (also named "Miyuki") returns from living overseas with their father (Miyuki's step-father) for six years, and they now live alone in the same house. This Miyuki is the daughter of his step-mother, and there is no blood relation between them.
This causes some problems as Masato is torn between his growing feelings for his step-sister (who doesn't seem to know they aren't related by blood, and insists on having a normal brother-sister relationship while constantly speculating on "if we got married...") and his very obvious feelings for his classmate Miyuki. As a result of living with his sister, he is constantly seeing women's underwear and finding them in his pants pockets, leading to embarrassing situations with his classmate Miyuki.
Partway through the series, Masato is the second of two people to come down with the mysterious "Miyuki Illness" (みゆき病, Miyuki-byō), caused by going an extended period without seeing his sister Miyuki.
Miyuki Wakamatsu (若松 みゆき, Wakamatsu Miyuki)
Voiced by: Yōko Oginome (Anime television series), Portrayed by Yukari Usami (movie)
Masato's younger step-sister, unrelated by blood. Her birthday is 9 February 1966. She has short wavy hair, though it becomes a little longer as the series progresses (a little past shoulder length at the end of the series). Despite being younger, she gets much better grades than Masato, and she excels in athletic events and English language skill, because she lived abroad with her step-father for six years. She is extremely popular among the boys at school. She has a very bright and cheerful personality. Even though Miyuki tries to brush off those actively courting her, they end up causing more headaches for Masato than Miyuki does. As her brother, Masato tries to protect Miyuki from these encroaching "wild beasts", though this protectiveness slowly becomes indistinguishable from jealousy. Miyuki also begins seeing her brother's girlfriend, Miyuki Kashima, as a rival.
Miyuki Kashima (鹿島 みゆき, Kashima Miyuki)
Voiced by: Hiromi Tsuru (Anime television series), Portrayed by Hiroko Mita (movie)
In the same class and homeroom as Masato all during high school, this Miyuki is Masato's girlfriend for most of the series. She has long hair and is extremely popular among the boys in the school. She has the same birthday as Miyuki Wakamatsu, though she is one year older. She has had a crush on Masato since junior high school. She is extremely proactive in their relationship, regularly asking him to come to parties and over to her house even before they started regularly dating. Miyuki is a very kind and humble person. However, she can be forceful as well, and the beginning of her relationship with Masato is punctuated by her frequently slapping him due to one misunderstanding or another due to her becoming angry. She always apologizes to Masato afterward, however, asking him to forgive her for getting angry so easily.
She is an excellent student, cook, and seamstress. In order to go to the same university as Masato (and be in the same year), she purposely missed the application deadline despite having passed the entrance exam without any trouble. She subsequently attended the same cram school just to be with him. After overhearing the Wakamatsu sibling's secret (that they aren't related by blood) at the pre-wedding dinner reception for Yūichi Sawada and Miyuki Wakamatsu, she runs away and goes on a trip to Hokkaidō in order to sort out her feelings. While there, she runs into Yūichi, who is traveling there after breaking up with the other Miyuki.
Ryūichi Masaki (間崎 竜一, Masaki Ryūichi)
Voiced by: Ryūsuke Ōbayashi (Anime television series), Portrayed by Daisuke Shima (movie)
Ryūichi was in the same year as Masato, but he purposely failed his high school entrance exams in order to be in the same year as Masato's sister Miyuki. He is actually a year older than Masato, but it is not explained why he was held back the first time. After graduating from high school, he was able to pass his college entrance exams the first time. He fell in love with Miyuki Wakamatsu at first sight, and is constantly telling her how they will be able to go on school trips together, graduate together, go to class reunions together, and get married together. He is very proactive in his pursuit of Miyuki, which tends to annoy Masato.
Because he's something of a delinquent, he frequently does poorly on tests, which causes a lack of sympathy from his friends and acquaintances. He also frequently tricks his friends into working part time jobs during the summer. He is very strong, which helps him to win the frequent fights he has. He rarely wears a helmet while riding his motorcycle (even when giving rides to Miyuki Wakamatsu), though he does have a helmet. His family owns the "Kissaten Dragon", a coffee shop, where he frequently works part time. Ryūichi is the first to come down with the mysterious "Miyuki Illness".
Torao Nakata (中田 虎夫, Nakata Torao)
Voiced by: Tesshō Genda
The bachelor P.E. teacher at Miyuki Wakamatsu's junior high school. He transfers to Miyuki's high school as the P.E. teacher when she graduates junior high in order to near her. He considers Ryūichi to be his rival for the affections of Miyuki Wakamatsu, and a stylized Chinese dragon (representing Ryūichi) and tiger (representing Torao) fighting is frequently employed when the two meet. He is about 20 years older than Miyuki. His mother is constantly trying to set up omiai, or marriage meetings, with potential brides, but Torao doesn't want to be with anyone other than Miyuki Wakamatsu. He was briefly engaged to another woman named Miyuki, but the marriage was called off after Torao got drunk and was mouthing off in a bar while sitting next to that Miyuki's father. At the end of the series, he finally consents to go along with his mother's omiai planning.
Yasujirō Kashima (鹿島 安次郎, Kashima Yasujirō)
Voiced by: Kei Tomiyama
Miyuki Kashima's father. He is a detective with the local police department. He has a predilection for pretty young girls. After meeting Miyuki Wakamatsu during the New Year visit to the local shrine, he begins pursuing her and frequently invites her out for coffee. He frequently abuses his authority as a police detective in order to get closes to Miyuki. In return, Miyuki frequently abuses his kindness in order to get free rides to the grocery store and other locations to which she needs to go. This really annoys Masato, who is always calling him a "dirty old man" for chasing after his sister.
Kenji Kōsaka (香坂 健二, Kōsaka Kenji)
Voiced by: Katsuji Mori
Kenji is in the same year as Masato, a teacher's dream student who is good at sports and academics. He is handsome and has many girl fans in school, though he stubbornly only pursues Miyuki Kashima despite the fact that she never shows any interest in him and he fails at numerous attempts to tear her and Masato apart. In his senior year he was elated that he and Miyuki passed the local university's entrance exam while Masato failed but stunned to discover that Miyuki had deliberately missed the filing deadline for applications in order to go to the same prep school as Masato instead. He tried to drop out of university and join the prep school as well but classes were full. He's one of three pursuing the affections of Miyuki Kashima.
Yūichi Sawada (沢田 優一, Sawada Yūichi)
An old friend of the Wakamatsu family, Yūichi used to play with Masato all the time when they were younger. He was Masato's next-door neighbor until his high school years, at which point his parents moved to West Germany. He's a university student, and an excellent soccer player. In the second half of the series, he suddenly returned to Japan in order to play on the national team during the Olympics. After returning, he stays at the Wakamatsu home for a short time while looking for his own apartment. After he moves out, he begins pursuing Miyuki Wakamatsu, and even asks Masato if it's okay for him to do so. This causes Masato to really consider what his true feelings are for his step-sister. At the end of the series, Yūichi runs into Miyuki Kashima as she's travelling in Hokkaidō and trying to sort her own feelings.
Yoshio Muraki (村木 好夫, Muraki Yoshio)
Voiced by: Kaneto Shiozawa
Yoshio is in the same year as Masato, has similar grades and similar perverted tastes, and can be found almost anywhere Masato goes. He almost always appears when Masato and Miyuki Kashima are having or planning an important moment together, and he tries to include himself in their plans. He is constantly asking Masato how someone like Miyuki could possibly fall in love with someone like him. Yoshio has a younger sister, though he rarely talks about her and doesn't think much of her (at least not that he'll admit to). He did not attend Yūichi Sawada's and Miyuki Wakamatsu's pre-wedding banquet reception.

== Media ==
=== Manga ===
Second edition

No.	Japanese release date	Japanese ISBN
1	April 10, 1990	4-09122-821-6
Chapters 1–17
Masato Wakamatsu is working at a summer beach house and tries to court his classmate Miyuki Kashima. After failing and humiliating himself, he befriends a pretty girl at the beach; he returns home and discovers that pretty girl is his step-sister, Miyuki Wakamatsu, whom was separated from him for the past six years and has returned to live with him. At school, Kashima empathizes with Wakamatsu's mistakes and the two begin dating. Meanwhile, Masato's friend, Ryūichi Masaki, attempts to court Miyuki, who plays along but is apathetic towards his approach. Meanwhile at home, Masato is conflicted between seeing Miyuki as a girl and sister and continues adjusting to his life with her. Later, Masato goes on a date with Kashima but is sabotaged by Miyuki, who feels neglected by him. Afterwards, Torao Nakata, Miyuki's middle school gym teacher, and Yasujirō Kashima, Kashima's father, fall for Miyuki's beauty and attempts to court her. A year passes and Miyuki enrolls into Masato's school and is stalked by Torao who becomes the highschool gym teacher. Later, Yasujirō blackmails Masato into inviting him and Miyuki to a picnic in order to date his daughter. Masato agrees, regrets it immediately, and expresses relief when weather cancels their trip. Masato's popular classmate, Kenji Kōsaka, attempts to court Kashima and Miyuki only to be outdone by Masato.
2	May 10, 1990	4-09122-822-4
Chapters 18–36
Masato discovers a letter from his father asking Miyuki to return abroad with him; Miyuki declines and opts to stay with Masato instead. Torao comes down with a cold and is visited by Miyuki. Torao attempts to propose to Miyuki but mistakenly proposes to Miyuki Euhara, his marriage candidate. Later, Masato and his friends arrange a mountain trip and are sabotaged by Ryūichi, who blackmails them to work at his beach house so he could be with Miyuki. At the beach house, Ryūichi attempts to rape Miyuki but is outwitted by her and falls asleep instead. Later, Ryūichi needs a blood transplant and demands one from Miyuki; Masato worries Miyuki might discover they are not blood related but learns they coincidentally share the same blood type; Masato then donates blood in her place. After summer, Torao convinces Miyuki to go on a pity date with him, and antagonizes his fiancé's father to escape marriage. Masato's class has a field trip leaving Miyuki alone. Ryūichi, Torao, and Yasujirō then intrude upon Miyuki's home, hoping to seduce her. Masato is able to deduce Miyuki's situation, despite her facade, and returns home early. Kashima begins to feel neglected by Masato, who prioritizes Miyuki over her, and asks another guy out. That person is revealed to have neglected his family for Kashima, causing her to end the date and gain new insight towards Masato. During the winter break, a Canadian man attempts to marry Miyuki but is deported and returned to his fiancé. School resumes and Ryūichi is to be expelled from school due to multiple repeats. In his anger, he accidentally performs notable good deeds, earning him media recognition and pressures the school to promote him to the next grade.
3	June 10, 1990	4-09122-823-2
Chapters 37–55
Masato's class arranges a play with Kashima as the heroine and Kenji as the hero. Masato saves Kenji's life and usurps the role as the hero due to the latter becoming injured. Later, the plane Masato's father is on crashes and the two plan on how to survive financially without him. Shortly after, they learn he is alive. This event causes Masato to wonder what to do with his life and decides to enter a university with Kashima. Kashima is living with Masato until her parents return from their vacation. Miyuki tells her a story about a boy who saved her from a lion whom she promised marriage to in return. Kashima discovers claw marks on Masato's back and realizes he was the boy. After Kashima's parents return, at school, Ryūichi cons the students to take pictures of girls in their underwear. Masato almost enters pictures of Miyuki, who volunteered, but reconsiders at the thought of people seeing Miyuki's body. Later, Kenji makes multiple attempts to sabotage Masato's relationship with Kashima but is overcome by the couple. Returning home from the trip, Ryūichi avoids Miyuki, hoping his disappearance would trick her into seeing him. He begins to develop Miyuki-withdrawals and becomes sick; a coincidental meeting with her cures him and he returns to his normal courting activities. Later, Masato meets his childhood caretaker who he asks to keep his non-existent blood relationship with Miyuki a secret. Right after, he realizes he lost the family registry at school. A loner student finds it and blackmails Masato to treat him to ramen.
4	July 10, 1990	4-09122-824-0
Chapters 56–75
The loner student attempts to blackmail Masato to set him up on a date with Miyuki. After being rebuffed by Miyuki, the loner student gains a new personality and is able to befriend his classmates before transferring schools. Masato discovers he failed his university entrance exam. In response, Kashima takes a year off to attend cram school with him. The two then continue their daily lives until summer, where Miyuki's father requests to send her to Australia for the break. Masato discovers that Ryūichi and Torao intend to follow Miyuki to Australia. After hearing about the aggressive nature of men there, Masato tells Miyuki to stay with him. After enjoying their summer, Ryūichi blackmails his teacher to host a play where he and Miyuki are the romantic leads. Ryūichi and his replacement both require a sudden appendectomy, allowing Masato to usurp his position in the play. The play concludes with a kiss between the two.
5	August 10, 1990	4-09122-824-0
Chapters 76–95
The school exam date approaches and Miyuki makes herself scarce so Masato can concentrate. After passing the test, Masato collapses from Miyuki-withdrawal. Their daily life continues until spring, where Masato's childhood friend, Yūichi Sawada, returns to visit. Yūichi falls in love with Miyuki and asks Masato for permission to marry her. Masato accepts, believing it is his duty as a brother and Yūichi would bring her happiness, but is uncomfortable with his decision. During Yūichi and Miyuki's wedding, Masato confesses his non blood-relation to Miyuki and his feelings of love towards her. Months later, Masato and Miyuki are married in the Philippines offscreen and send postcards to all their acquaintances in Japan. Elsewhere, Yūichi meets Kashima in the streets and the two approach each other happily.

=== Anime ===
Cover of ''Miyuki'' Music Issue LP with Miyuki Wakamatsu on the cover.

The anime television series aired from March 31, 1983, to April 20, 1984, on the Fuji TV network. Because Kitty Film was already producing the popular Urusei Yatsura anime television series, they asked Tomoyuki Miyata from Tatsunoko Pro to produce the Miyuki series, Mizuho Nishikubo to be the supervising director for the series, and had their own in-house studio (Kitty Mitaka Studio) handle the animation. Fuji TV had wanted Group TAC, the studio which had done the animation for the first Nine TV special, to do the animation, but arrangements had already been made. Subsequent Adachi works were all animated by Group TAC.

The lead role of voicing Miyuki Wakamatsu was given to Yōko Oginome after she auditioned for Kitty Film's Shonben Rider. Masatoshi Nagase, the voice actor for Masato Wakamatsu, is known for his passionate acting and his love scenes.

Kitty Records was contracted to provide the music for the series, and one group, H_{2}O, supplied the opening theme and two of the three ending themes. H_{2}O's song "'Full of Memories" (想い出がいっぱい, Omoide ga Ippai) was a hit, reaching #6 on the Oricon charts. It is considered one of the "standard songs" from 1980's era Japan.

The series uses four pieces of theme music: an opening and three closing themes. The opening theme is "10% Chance of Rain" (10%の雨予報, Jū-pāsento no Ame Yohō) by H_{2}O, with the lyrics of the chorus slightly altered from the original version to be more appropriate to the series. The first ending theme is "Full of Memories" (想い出がいっぱい, Omoide ga Ippai) by H_{2}O and was used up to episode 13 and returns for episodes 20 to 22. The second ending theme is "Summer Holiday" (サマー·ホリデー, Samā Horidē) by Michiko Kawai and was used between episodes 14 and 19. The final ending theme is "Good-bye Season" (Good-bye シーズン, Guddobai Shīzun) by H_{2}O and was used for the remaining episodes.

After its original run on the Fuji TV network, the series was rebroadcast on the NTV network in 1986.

A Spanish language dub of the anime series was made in Venezuela in 1992 and aired on Telecinco in Spain. The series is known as Vacaciones de verano ("Summer Vacation") in Spanish and the dubbers changed the given names of most of the main characters, with Masato becoming Toni, Miyuki Kashima changed to Katia, and Miyuki Wakamatsu altered to Monica. However, their family names (Wakamatsu, Kashima, etc.) did remain unchanged.

=== Film ===
The Miyuki anime television movie aired in the Fuji TV Nissei Family Special slot on September 16, 1983. It was directed by Kazuyuki Izutsu. Screenwriter Yumiko Takaboshi later worked on the composition of Touch anime series. It came out at the same time the Nine the Original movie was released in theaters. The Nine movie was made by the same staff which later worked on the Touch anime series.

=== TV drama ===
The TV drama special aired as part of the Monday Dramaland (月曜ドラマランド, Getsuyō Doramarando) on Fuji TV on August 4, 1986.

- Masato Wakamatsu: Makoto Nonomura
- Miyuki Wakamatsu: Sonoko Kawai
- Miyuki Kashima: Sonoko Kawai

Staff

- Original Work: Mitsuru Adachi
- Teleplay: Keiji Okutsu
- Director: Setsurō Wakamatsu
