= H2 (manga) =

Japanese manga series

- First tankōbon volume cover, featuring Hiro Kunimi
- Genre: Romantic comedy; Sports
- Manga
- Written by: Mitsuru Adachi
- Published by: Shogakukan
- Imprint: Shōnen Sunday Comics
- Magazine: Weekly Shōnen Sunday
- Original run: July 29, 1992 – November 24, 1999
- Volumes: 34
- Anime television series
- Directed by: Hidehito Ueda
- Produced by: Koichiro Fujita; Akira Kotake; Yoko Matsushita; Tatsushi Yamazaki; Masako Fukuyo; Hiroshi Kato
- Written by: Akira Okeya
- Music by: Taro Iwashiro
- Studio: Ashi Productions
- Original network: ANN (ABC, TV Asahi)
- Original run: June 1, 1995 – March 21, 1996
- Episodes: 41
- Television drama

H2: Kimi to Ita Hibi
- Original network: TBS
- Original run: January 13, 2005 – March 30, 2005
- Episodes: 11
- icon

H2 is a Japanese baseball-themed manga series written and illustrated by Mitsuru Adachi. It was serialized in Shogakukan's shōnen manga magazine Weekly Shōnen Sunday from July 1992 to November 1999, with its chapters collected in 34 tankōbon volumes. A 41-episode anime television series adaptation aired from June 1995 to March 1996. An 11-episode television drama series adaptation, H2: Kimi to Ita Hibi, directed by Yukihiko Tsutsumi was broadcast from January to March 2005.

By August 2018, the manga series had over 55 million copies in circulation, making it one of the best-selling manga series.

== Plot ==
Hiro Kunimi, Hideo Tachibana, and Atsushi Noda form a formidable trio on their middle school baseball team, leading it to consecutive national championships with an undefeated record. During this time, Hiro facilitates a relationship between Hideo and their childhood friend Hikari Amamiya, only to later realize his own romantic feelings for her. Hikari, in turn, begins to see Hiro as more than just a brotherly figure. Upon entering high school, Hiro and Noda receive a devastating medical diagnosis from a discredited physician, falsely warning that continued baseball participation would result in catastrophic injuries. Believing their dreams of reaching Kōshien shattered, they enroll at Senkawa High School, which lacks a baseball team. Hiro joins the soccer team while Noda takes up swimming, while Hideo and Hikari attend Meiwa Daiichi High School, renowned for its elite baseball program.

Senkawa's unofficial baseball fan club, managed by the earnest but accident-prone Haruka Koga, draws Hiro back to the sport during an impromptu match against the school's soccer team. Disillusioned by the arrogance of the soccer team's captain and star player, Hiro switches sides mid-game, nearly leading the fan club to an improbable comeback. This performance reignites his passion for baseball, and when the false medical diagnosis is exposed, he and Noda decide to remain at Senkawa. With Haruka's support, they persuade the school's skeptical headmaster to establish an official baseball team after a closely contested practice game against Meiwa Daiichi, which Senkawa narrowly loses due to questionable officiating.

Under the guidance of novice coach Fujio Koga, Haruka's brother, the newly formed team faces Eikyo High School, a dominant program known for its ruthless tactics, including deliberate player injuries. Despite losing decisively, Senkawa's sportsmanship contrasts sharply with Eikyo's win-at-all-costs mentality. The following year, the team strengthens with new members, including Sagawa, a former delinquent with ties to Hideo, and two players initially planted as saboteurs by Eikyo's star pitcher, Hirota. All three ultimately embrace Senkawa's camaraderie and contribute significantly to the team's success. Senkawa avenges its earlier loss by defeating Eikyo in the divisional tournament, advancing to the national Kōshien tournament. A potential showdown with Meiwa Daiichi is thwarted when Hiro suffers an injury in the second round, leading to Senkawa's elimination. Meiwa Daiichi proceeds to win the summer tournament.

Amidst these developments, Hiro confesses his long-standing feelings for Hikari, though he also grows closer to Haruka after defending her from harassment. Meanwhile, Hikari experiences personal tragedy when her mother passes away unexpectedly, deepening her emotional bonds with both Hiro and Hideo. The rivalry between Hiro and Hideo culminates in a Kōshien semifinal matchup. Hiro pitches a near-flawless game, holding Hideo hitless until the final at-bat, where a would-be home run drifts foul. Hideo strikes out on the next pitch, securing Senkawa's victory. In the aftermath, Hideo reconciles with Hikari, acknowledging his dependence on her, while Hiro implies to Haruka his aspirations for professional baseball, which she vows to support. Senkawa advances to the Kōshien final, leaving their ultimate fate undisclosed.

== Characters ==
Hiro Kunimi (国見 比呂, Kunimi Hiro)
Voiced by: Shinnosuke Furumoto
Portrayed by: Takayuki Yamada
Hiro moves to Senkawa to abandon baseball, but later becomes the star pitcher of its newly formed team. A natural talent with unmatched dedication, he excels as a power hitter and elite fielder. His extraordinary stamina and focus allow him to dominate games, with a fastball exceeding 150 km/h and an unpredictable forkball. He also develops a high-speed slider that tests even professional catchers. Hiro introduces Hikari to Hideo and struggles with lingering feelings for her while growing closer to Senkawa's manager, Koga Haruka.
Hideo Tachibana (橘 英雄, Tachibana Hideo)
Voiced by: Mitsuru Miyamoto
Portrayed by: Koutaro Tanaka
Hiro's best friend and greatest rival, Hideo played alongside him in middle school and has dated Hikari since then. A natural talent with relentless dedication, he aims to turn professional after high school. As Meiwa Daiichi High's cleanup hitter in his first year, his exceptional batting skill quickly makes him a national standout. His ability is such that facing high school pitchers with an aluminum bat is considered unfair, underscoring his dominance at the plate.
Hikari Amamiya (雨宮 ひかり, Amamiya Hikari)
Voiced by: Keiko Imamura
Portrayed by: Yui Ichikawa
Hikari, Hiro's childhood friend and Hideo's girlfriend, aspires to be a journalist. A member of the archery club, she temporarily manages Meiwa Daiichi's baseball team during Koshien at Hideo's request. While committed to Hideo, she also harbors unresolved feelings for Hiro.
Haruka Koga (古賀 春華, Koga Haruka)
Voiced by: Masami Suzuki
Portrayed by: Satomi Ishihara
Daughter to the businessman whom Hiro's father works for, she was a high school baseball enthusiast. A hardworking baseball club manager, she played an instrumental role in creating and supporting Senkawa's baseball club. As time goes along, her feelings for Hiro grow more apparent. She dreams of being an air flight stewardess as well as a professional baseballer's wife.
Atsushi Noda (野田 敦, Noda Atsushi)
Voiced by: Kenjiro Tsuda
Portrayed by: Akiyoshi Nakao
Noda, Senkawa's catcher and the third member of Hiro and Hideo's friendship, completes the team's battery. Despite his lazy demeanor, Hiro recognizes his skill in fielding decisions and team management. Known for his humor and bad puns, he is also perceptive and leads as team captain by his second year. As Senkawa's cleanup hitter, his batting is powerful but inconsistent, blending strength and timing effectively.
Ryūtaro Kine (木根 竜太郎, Kine Ryūtarō)
Voiced by: Shinichi Takenaka
Portrayed by: Yuma Ishigaki
Kine, a former Hakusan Angels pitcher in primary school, switched to soccer after Hideo replaced him. His athleticism aids his return to baseball when he joins Senkawa to pursue Haruka. As leadoff batter and center fielder—the best in the series—he combines skill with luck, though his brash personality often provides comic relief. While initially discouraging Haruka's baseball ambitions, he later schemes with Miho to disrupt her growing bond with Hiro. Despite his boastful nature, he demonstrates sharp baseball instincts and works hard when motivated.
Miho Osanai (小山内 美歩, Osanai Miho)
Miho, a Meiwa Daiichi manager, joins to pursue Hideo but is repeatedly thwarted by his loyalty to Hikari. After failed attempts to separate them, she conspires with Kine—only for their scheming to bring the two closer instead.

== Media ==
=== Manga ===
H2 is written and illustrated by Mitsuru Adachi. The manga ran in Shogakukan's shōnen manga magazine Weekly Shōnen Sunday from July 29, 1992, to November 24, 1999. Shogakukan collected its chapters in 34 tankōbon volumes, released from December 12, 1992, to March 18, 2000. Shogakukan re-published the series in 17 wide-ban volumes, released from August 6, 2004, to March 2, 2005, and 20 bunkoban volumes, released from May 15, 2009, to February 13, 2010.

==== Volumes ====
No.	Japanese release date	Japanese ISBN
1	December 12, 1992	4-09-123151-9
2	February 18, 1993	4-09-123152-7
3	May 18, 1993	4-09-123153-5
4	July 17, 1993	4-09-123154-3
5	October 18, 1993	4-09-123155-1
6	December 11, 1993	4-09-123156-X
7	March 18, 1994	4-09-123157-8
8	May 18, 1994	4-09-123158-6
9	August 10, 1994	4-09-123159-4
10	December 10, 1994	4-09-123160-8
11	March 18, 1995	4-09-123501-8
12	June 17, 1995	4-09-123502-6
13	July 18, 1995	4-09-123503-4
14	August 10, 1995	4-09-123504-2
15	December 9, 1995	4-09-123505-0
16	April 18, 1996	4-09-123506-9
17	June 18, 1996	4-09-123507-7
18	September 18, 1996	4-09-123508-5
19	December 10, 1996	4-09-123509-3
20	March 18, 1997	4-09-123510-7
21	May 17, 1997	4-09-125221-4
22	August 9, 1997	4-09-125222-2
23	November 18, 1997	4-09-125223-0
24	February 18, 1998	4-09-125224-9
25	April 18, 1998	4-09-125225-7
26	July 18, 1998	4-09-125226-5
27	September 18, 1998	4-09-125227-3
28	December 10, 1998	4-09-125228-1
29	March 18, 1999	4-09-125229-X
30	June 16, 1999	4-09-125230-3
31	August 7, 1999	4-09-125601-5
32	October 18, 1999	4-09-125602-3
33	January 18, 2000	4-09-125603-1
34	March 18, 2000	4-09-125604-X

=== Anime ===
A 41-episode anime television series adaptation produced by Asahi Broadcasting Corporation, Toho and Asatsu and animated by Ashi Productions was broadcast on ABC, TV Asahi and their affiliates between June 1, 1995, and March 21, 1996.

==== Episodes ====
No.	Title	Original release date
1	"Youth = (equal) baseball?" Transliteration: "Seishun = (ikōru) yakyūdesu ka" (Japanese: 青春=（イコール）野球ですか)	June 1, 1995
2	"Aim Ryogoku Kokugikan"; Transliteration: "Mezase ryōkokukokugikan" (Japanese: めざせ両国国技館)	June 8, 1995
3	"Ooioi soccer club" Transliteration: "Oioi sakkā-bu" (Japanese: おいおいサッカー部)	June 15, 1995
4	"Only baseball was different" Transliteration: "Yakyū dake wa betsudatta" (Japanese: 野球だけは別だった)	June 22, 1995
5	"Do I need a membership notification?" Transliteration: "Nyūkai-todoke ga hitsuyōdesu ka?" (Japanese: 入会届が必要ですか？)	June 29, 1995
6	"This is Kunimi Hiro!"; Transliteration: "Kore ga kunimi hiroda!" (Japanese: これが国見比呂だ！)	July 6, 1995
7	"Loving Circle, wanna quit?" Transliteration: "Aikō-kai, yamemasu ka?" (Japanese: 愛好会、やめますか？)	July 13, 1995
8	"Due to a weak elbow like glass" Transliteration: "Garasu no hiji datte sa" (Japanese: ガラスのヒジだってさ)	July 20, 1995
9	"That's what God wanted to see" Transliteration: "Kamisama ga mitakatta ndaro" (Japanese: 神様が見たかったんだろ)	July 27, 1995
10	"That's nasty spread ..."; Transliteration: "Iyana tenkaida na…" (Japanese: いやな展開だな…)	August 3, 1995
11	"Down! Meiwa first" Transliteration: "Datto! Meiwa daichi" (Japanese: 打倒！明和第一)	August 10, 1995
12	"I wonder if I'm not lucky" Transliteration: "Kuji un nai no ka na" (Japanese: クジ運ないのかな)	August 17, 1995
13	"As a friend, you'll undersrand" Transliteration: "Tomodachinara wakaru yo ne" (Japanese: 友達ならわかるよね)	August 24, 1995
14	"Second troops came out" Transliteration: "Ni-gun ga dete kita ze" (Japanese: 二軍が出てきたぜ)	August 31, 1995
15	"It ’s pretty cool, right?" Transliteration: "Kekkō kakkoīdaro" (Japanese: けっこうカッコいいだろ)	September 7, 1995
16	"This time, I'll not miss it" Transliteration: "Kondo wa hazure janai wa yo" (Japanese: 今度はハズレじゃないわよ)	September 14, 1995
17	"Hiro injured!? What to do Baseball Loving Circle."; Transliteration: "Hiro fushō! ? Dō suru yakyūaikōkai" (Japanese: 比呂負傷!?どうする野球愛好会)	September 21, 1995
18	"Exciting game nine times back! Batter is Kunimi .."; Transliteration: "Nessen kyūkaiura! Battā wa Kunimi…" (Japanese: 熱戦九回裏！バッターは国見…)	October 5, 1995
19	"A big reversal! Senkawa baseball bring begin birth?" Transliteration: "Dai gyakuten! Senkawa Yakyubu Tanjo?" (Japanese: 大逆転！千川野球部誕生？)	October 5, 1995
20	"Catch along! Hiro VS Haruka"; Transliteration: "Tsuiseki! Hiro VS Haruka" (Japanese: 追跡！比呂VS春華)	October 19, 1995
21	"Haruka, Hikari, and Hiro's Sea"; Transliteration: "Haruka to Hikari to Hiro no umi" (Japanese: 春華とひかりと比呂の海)	October 26, 1995
22	"Pinch hitter dating. Two Guys that unable to return" Transliteration: "Daida dēto kaerenaifutari" (Japanese: 代打デート・帰れない二人)	November 2, 1995
23	"I can't sleep ... Night for two" Transliteration: "Nemurenai yo… futaridake no yoru" (Japanese: 眠れないよ…二人だけの夜)	November 9, 1995
24	"Each Single Summer like Fireworks"; Transliteration: "Sorezore no natsu hanabi no yō ni" (Japanese: それぞれの夏・花火のように)	November 16, 1995
25	"Director decided! I am Fujio Koga"; Transliteration: "Kantoku kettei! Watashi ga Koga Fujiodesu" (Japanese: 監督決定！私が古賀富士夫です)	November 23, 1995
26	"Sayonara-senpai! Send-off match of tears" Transliteration: "Sayonara senpai! Namida no sōkō shiai" (Japanese: サヨナラ先輩！涙の壮行試合)	November 30, 1995
27	"Hide-chan's changeable home run" Transliteration: "Hidechan maboroshi no hōmuran" (Japanese: ヒデちゃん幻のホームラン)	December 7, 1995
28	"Memorial match! Dangerous people came" Transliteration: "Kinen shiai! Abunai yatsura ga yattekita" (Japanese: 記念試合！危ない奴らがやって来た)	December 14, 1995
29	"Hikari pinch! Trap of Shuji!?"; Transliteration: "Hikari pinchi! Shūji no wana! ?" (Japanese: ひかりピンチ！周二の罠!?)	December 21, 1995
30	"Hikari's lie. Hiro's Tears"; Transliteration: "Hikari no uso Hiro no namida" (Japanese: ひかりのウソ比呂の涙)	January 11, 1996
31	"A new rival! Seikyo and Hirota"; Transliteration: "Aratanaru kōtekishu (raibaru)! Sakae Kyō Hirota" (Japanese: 新たなる好敵手（ライバル）！栄京・広田)	January 18, 1996
32	"Genius Tachibana's spirit of the batter's box" Transliteration: "Tensai Tachibana kihaku no battābokkusu" (Japanese: 天才・橘気迫のバッターボックス)	January 25, 1996
33	"Welcome to the Senkawa Festival! Seikyo Gakuen"; Transliteration: "Senkawa-sai kangei! Seikyo Gakuen-sama" (Japanese: 千川祭歓迎！栄京学園さま)	February 1, 1996
34	"I don't hate serious competition" Transliteration: "Shinken shōbu wa kiraijanai sa" (Japanese: 真剣勝負は嫌いじゃないさ)	February 8, 1996
35	"Must try Notice strikeout?" Transliteration: "Yokoku sanshin shiro tte ka?" (Japanese: 予告三振しろってか？)	February 22, 1996
36	"My score book is 3: 1"; Transliteration: "Ore no sukoabukku wa 3 tai 1-sa" (Japanese: 俺のスコアブックは3対1さ)	February 29, 1996
37	"Achoo! Waiting in the cardboard" Transliteration: "Kushun! Danbōru no naka no machibōke" (Japanese: クシュン！ダンボールの中の待ちぼうけ)	March 7, 1996
38	"First date! Best regards from now on" Transliteration: "Hatsu dēto! Korekara mo yoroshiku" (Japanese: 初デート！これからもよろしく)	March 14, 1996
39	"I can't take Gibbs of my heart" Transliteration: "Kokoro no gibusu ga tore tenē zo" (Japanese: 心のギブスがとれてねえぞ)	Never telecasted
40	"A dream that will never change" Transliteration: "Itsu made mo kawaranai yume" (Japanese: いつまでも変わらない夢)	Never telecasted
41	"Summer Pledge, Start from here!" Transliteration: "Natsu e no chikai koko kara sutāto!" (Japanese: 夏への誓いここからスタート！)	March 21, 1996

== Reception ==
By August 2018, the H2 manga had over 55 million copies in circulation. On TV Asahi's Manga Sōsenkyo 2021 poll, in which 150,000 people voted for their top 100 manga series, H2 ranked 72nd.
