= Cross Game =

Japanese manga series by Mitsuru Adachi

- First tankōbon volume cover, featuring Ko (left) and Wakaba

クロスゲーム (Kurosu Gēmu)
- Genre: Coming-of-age; Romantic comedy; Sports
- Manga
- Written by: Mitsuru Adachi
- Published by: Shogakukan
- English publisher: NA: Viz Media
- Imprint: Shōnen Sunday Comics
- Magazine: Weekly Shōnen Sunday
- Original run: April 27, 2005 – February 17, 2010
- Volumes: 17
- Anime television series
- Directed by: Osamu Sekita
- Produced by: Shunji Aoki (1–13); Fukashi Azuma (14–26); Shinnosuke Wada (27–50); Naohiko Furuichi
- Written by: Michihiro Tsuchiya
- Music by: Kōtarō Nakagawa
- Studio: SynergySP
- Licensed by: NA: Viz Media
- Original network: TXN (TV Tokyo)
- Original run: April 5, 2009 – March 28, 2010
- Episodes: 50
- icon

Cross Game (Japanese: クロスゲーム, Hepburn: Kurosu Gēmu) is a Japanese baseball-themed manga series written and illustrated by Mitsuru Adachi. It was serialized in Shogakukan shōnen manga magazine Weekly Shōnen Sunday from April 2005 to February 2010, with its chapters collected in 17 tankōbon volumes. The series was adapted as a 50-episode anime television series that aired on the TV Tokyo network from April 2009 to March 2010.

Cross Game is the story of Ko Kitamura and the four neighboring Tsukishima sisters, Ichiyo, Wakaba, Aoba, and Momiji. Wakaba and Ko were born on the same day in the same hospital and are close enough that Wakaba treats Ko as her boyfriend, though nothing is officially declared, while Aoba, one year younger than them, hates how Ko is "taking" her sister away from her. After Wakaba dies in an accident, Ko and Aoba slowly grow closer as they strive to fulfill Wakaba's final dream of seeing them play in the high school baseball championship in Koshien Stadium. The manga is divided into multiple parts. Part One, which consists of volume one, is a prologue that takes place while the main characters are in elementary school, ending in tragedy. Part Two starts four years later with Ko in his third year of junior high and continues into the summer of his third year of high school. Part Three continues the story without a break, ending with Ko and Aoba traveling to Koshien.

In 2009, Cross Game received the 54th Shogakukan Manga Award for the shōnen category. Both the manga and its anime adaptation have been overall well received by critics.

== Plot ==
Ko Kitamura, son of the owner of Kitamura Sports, lives near the batting center operated by the Tsukishima family. The two families maintain a long-standing friendship, with their children frequently visiting each other's homes. As Ko and Wakaba Tsukishima are the same age and often together, Wakaba's younger sister Aoba resents the attention he gives her. Aoba demonstrates natural talent as a pitcher, while Ko secretly trains to match her skill despite outwardly showing little interest in baseball. Their lives change when Wakaba drowns in an accident during fifth grade.

By junior high, Ko continues his covert training. Upon entering Seishu High School, he joins the baseball club alongside childhood friends Akaishi and Nakanishi. However, the interim principal appoints a new head coach who recruits transfer students as elite players, forming a first-string team led by star athlete Yūhei Azuma. Refusing evaluation tests, Ko and his friends are relegated to the second-string "portable" team under former coach Maeno, practicing at a junior high field. Tensions escalate between the two squads, culminating in a close scrimmage where the portable team narrowly loses.

During summer break, while the first-string competes in prefectural qualifiers for Koshien, Maeno trains the portable team at a shuttered elementary school with help from an enigmatic mentor. They play six practice matches against strong regional teams. When the interim principal moves to disband the portable team, Maeno demands a decisive rematch—the losing squad and its coach would depart. With Aoba joining, the portable team secures a narrow victory, dissolving the first-string team and prompting the head coach and interim principal's transfer.

The following spring, Ko enters his second year while Aoba enrolls at Seishu. Yūhei remains and moves in with Ko after the first-string dormitory closes. The rebuilt team triumphs over Sannō High in the summer prefectural tournament's first round but falls to Ryuō in extra innings during the second. Ryuō advances to Koshien, reaching the semifinals before later winning the spring invitational tournament.

During summer break, Akane Takigawa—a girl resembling Wakaba—moves next door to Ko, unsettling him, Aoba, and Akaishi, who harbored feelings for Wakaba. Akane befriends the group and begins working at the Tsukishima café. Romantic tensions deepen when Yūhei expresses interest in Aoba, while Junpei Azuma, Yūhei's brother, becomes assistant coach after promising to marry Ichiyo if Seishu reaches Koshien.

== Media ==
=== Manga ===
Written and illustrated by Mitsuru Adachi, Cross Game, was serialized in Shogakukan's shōnen manga magazine Weekly Shōnen Sunday from April 27, 2005, to February 17, 2010. The series is divided into multiple parts. Part One, "Wakaba's Season", consists of volume one, and takes place while the main characters are in elementary school. Part Two, "Aoba's Season", covering volumes 2 through 14, with chapter numbering restarted from 1, begins four years later with Ko in his third year of junior high school and continues into high school. In October 2008, the series went on hiatus at the end of Part Two, resuming in March 2009 with the start of Part Three, which is untitled and covers volumes 15 through 17, with Ko in the summer of his third year of high school. Shogakukan collected its 160 individual chapters in seventeen tankōbon volumes, released from September 2, 2005, to April 16. 2010.

The series is licensed in France by Editions Tonkam, in Italy by Flashbook Editore, in South Korea by Daiwon C.I., in Hong Kong by Jonesky, in Taiwan by Chingwin Publishing Group, in Indonesia by Elex Media Komputindo, and in Thailand by Vibulkij Publishing.

In March 2010, Viz Media announced that they had licensed the series for release in North America. The first volume, collecting the first three tankōbon volumes, was published October 12, 2010. The eighth and final volume was released on November 13, 2012.

=== Anime ===
Cross Game was adapted into an anime television series produced by TV Tokyo, Shogakukan-Shueisha Productions and SynergySP. It was directed by Osamu Sekita, with Michihiro Tsuchiya handling series composition, Yūji Kondō designing the characters and Kotaro Nakagawa composing the music. The series aired on the TV Tokyo network beginning on April 5, 2009, in the 10:00–10:30 am slot; episodes began syndication later in April 2009 on AT-X and other channels in Japan, and finished airing on March 28, 2010. The first DVD volume of episodes was released in Japan on July 24, 2009, with additional DVDs released monthly.

The opening theme song, "Summer Rain", was written by Kentarō Kobuchi and sung by Kobukuro. It was released by Warner Music Japan on April 15, 2009, in both regular and limited edition versions, and peak ranked at #2 on the Oricon singles chart. The ending theme song for episodes 1–13, "Heartfelt Dream" (恋焦がれて見た夢, Koi Kogarete Mita Yume), was composed and sung by Ayaka and arranged by Shintarō Tokita. It was released as a single by Warner Music Japan in both regular and limited edition versions on April 22, 2009, and reached #6 on the Oricon singles chart. The ending theme for episodes 14–26, "Orange Days" (オレンジDays, Orenji Days) by Squarehood, was released as a single by Warner Music Japan on August 5, 2009. The ending theme song for episodes 27–39 was "Moeruyō na Koi ja naikedo" (燃えるような恋じゃないけど) by Tsuru, which was released as a single on November 11, 2009. The ending theme song for episodes 40–49 was "Rehearsal" (リハーサル, "Rihaiseru") by Natsuko Kondō. The final ending theme, for episode 50, was Loving Maiden (恋スル乙女, Koisuru Otome), also by Kondō.

Viz began streaming the Cross Game anime in the United States in May 2010.

== Reception ==
Cross Game won the 54th Shogakukan Manga Award for the shōnen category in 2009. The first volume of the French edition won the Prix Tam-Tam Dlire Manga 2007. The manga was also used in an academic paper presented at the 2007 conference of the International Research Society for Children's Literature as an example of telling a story using "silent" scenes (scenes with no dialogue) to powerfully convey a message.

The first two volumes of the Japanese edition were described by Anime News Network as "quietly brilliant" and "the slice-of-life genre at its best", saying that despite some "storytelling goofs", there is "no matching the pleasant feelings that come from reading this series." The French edition was praised by Manga News as a "great success" and "a pure delight as usual," citing as key ingredients the "appealing and funny characters" put in funny situations, accessible drawing style, and Adachi's talent for staging baseball scenes; Adachi was praised for his ability to mix "the sports world which he cherishes so much and the love relationships that are not yet real but so much implied and awaited" and his skill at rendering moving scenes without dialogue. The reviewer noted that while Adachi's art style has not changed much since Touch, his layouts are cleaner and his action scenes more dynamic than before. Anime Land praised Adachi for his "sense of the elliptical and staging", the verisimilitude of his stories, appealing secondary characters, and ability to develop comedy in just one panel. The reviewer claimed Adachi's handling of Wakaba's death is "remarkable" and that the event "gave real meaning" to the story.

The first episode of the anime series was called the "masterpiece of the new season" by ANN, which also complimented the musical score as "understated but highly effective". Two reviewers at ANN gave it the highest possible rating, and one said that he would have given it a higher rating if possible. Another praised its "honest and heartfelt storytelling" while saying it would be easy to call the episode's pacing "almost too-languid". A fourth reviewer found it to be typical of Adachi anime adaptations, but that the production values were "at best, mediocre and, at times, brushing up against the marginal".

Chris Beveridge of Mania.com, after viewing the first episode, said the series had "an older feeling to it" because of the rounder character designs reminiscent of those from the 1980s and 1990s, calling it a "great look" with a "wonderful simplicity" and backgrounds "filled with detail". Beveridge called the animation "solid", and stated that the series had "a whole lot of potential", making him excited to see more. He was impressed with the way the events of episode one were handled in the second episode, comparing the pacing and style to that of Kimagure Orange Road, which he stated is one of his favorites series. He especially liked the way the budding romance was shown between Ko and Wakaba back in the elementary school days, and how it affected the current relationship between Ko and Aoba.

Beveridge called the third episode "understated", moving at a slower pace which helps to begin showing the true nature of several of the characters, and the good pacing continues into the fourth episode where a dynamic between Akaishi, Nakanishi, and Ko is developed. Beveridge praised the character building in the fifth episode, calling the interaction of Ko and Aoba "very charming" and "reminiscent of real childhoods", with things "starting to fall into place" for the main focus of the series (high school baseball) by the end of the sixth episode. He praises the exposition used in the seventh episode, the protective instinct of Ko, Nakanishi, and Akaishi when it comes to Aoba, the use of flashbacks which show how the past is affecting the characters in the present, and the good pacing which "really sets it apart from almost every other sports show".
