= Taku Kitazaki =

Japanese manga artist

Taku Kitazaki (北崎拓, Kitazaki Taku, born July 27, 1966 in Hyougo, Japan) is a Japanese manga artist. His major works include Angel Cop, which was made into an anime series, and Tatoeba Konna Love Song. In 2006, his manga Cupid No Itazura Nijidama was made into a TV drama. He also did some work to support an Ultraman dojinshi as well as work for Nana to Kaoru: Black Label.
Masahito Soda, Motohiro Katou, Honna Wakou (creator of Nozoki Ana) and Taro Nogizaka (illustrator of Team Medical Dragon) are all his former assistants.

== Works ==
- Sorairo Miina (空色みーな)
- Angel Cop (エンジェルコップ)
- Tatoeba Konna Love Song (たとえばこんなラブソング)
- Hero Shigan (ヒーロー志願)
- Fu·ta·ri (ふ・た・り)
- Boukyou Senshi (望郷戦士)
- Masurao ~Yoshitsune Ki~ (ますらお 〜秘本義経記〜)
- Nagisa Me Kounin (なぎさMe公認)
- Time Skip Mao-chan (タイムスキップ 真央ちゃん)
- Nante Tantei Idol (なんてっ探偵♥アイドル)
- Kupido no Itazura Nijidama (クピドの悪戯 虹玉)
- Sakuranbo Syndrome: Kupido no Itazura II (さくらんぼシンドローム クピドの悪戯II)
- Ore X Yome: Kupido no Itazura (オレ×ヨメ 〜クピドの悪戯〜)
- Kono S o, Miyo!: Kupido no Itazura (このSを、見よ! クピドの悪戯)

Contributions to:

- Ultraman Begins 2011 Aratana Tatakai no Hajimari dojinshi – illustrations
- Nana to Kaoru: Black Label 4-panel – Bonus art
