= Short Program (manga) =

Japanese manga anthology

- Cover of volume 1, English language version.

ショート・プログラム (Shōto Puroguramu)
- Manga
- Written by: Mitsuru Adachi
- Published by: Shogakukan
- English publisher: NA: Viz Media
- Magazine: Various
- English magazine: NA: Animerica Extra
- Original run: January 1985 – May 2009
- Volumes: 4

Short Program (Japanese: ショート・プログラム, Hepburn: Shōto Puroguramu) is a Japanese manga anthology by Mitsuru Adachi. Four volumes compile stories selected from shōjo, shōnen, josei and seinen works released from 1985 until 2009.

== Volumes ==
=== Short Program ===
The first collection, titled simply Short Program, collected stories published between 1985 and 1988. In Japan, Shogakukan published this in November 1988. In the United States, Viz Media published this collection in March 2000. The chapters are arranged differently from the Japanese release, for unknown reasons. As was customary with most manga published in the US at the time, the pages were 'flipped' so that they read left to right, rather than right to left as originally drawn. It is also printed at a larger paper size than the now-standard manga size.

Short Program					ISBN 4-09-121881-4 (original release)		
Short Program					ISBN 4-09-127871-X (2005 re-release)		
(Canada) (United States) Short Program					ISBN 1-56931-473-X		
Japanese chapter	Viz chapter	English title	Japanese title	Rōmaji title	Serialized	Publication date	Summary
1	7	The Current State of Affairs	近況	Kinkyō	Shōnen Big Comic	January 1987	Kazuhiko Sugii goes to his class reunion for fun, but once he meets Asako Takazawa and Toshio Higashi, it dawns on him how clueless he was about the three of them back in school.
2	6	At the Intersection	交差点前	Kōsaten Mae	Shōnen Big Comic	April 1986	Takechi goes to that intersection at around 5 pm every day just to pass by a girl he crushes on, but never has the guts to confess to her or even knows her name, until a terrible misunderstanding results in her never coming again. But all this bad luck with her and his stupid friends may ultimately end up as good luck.
3	3	Short Program	ショート・プログラム	Shōto Puroguramu	Young Sunday	March 1987	Shirimura's on a date with a cool neighbor who has helped her a lot. But as their conversations unfold, she realizes she's dating a creep.
4	2	Take Off	テイク・オフ	Teiku Ofu	Young Sunday	April 1988	Nagashima came to Nishizaki's to watch a sport show on which Nakata, a woman Nagashima knew in his hometown, is doing the high jump. After recounting stories about her peculiar trait with his friend, Nagashima realizes her sporting goal may have something to do with him, and she's about to do the ultimate jump.
5	1	Change	チェンジ	Chenji	Weekly Shōnen Sunday	November 1985	Akatsuki has a crush on Etsuko who only has feelings for her boss at the coffee shop, while being rough on and unappreciative of Kei who's always enjoyed his company. Only when he finally realizes that Etsuko isn't meant for him and that Kei has changed only for him, Akatsuki changes too.
6	8	Plus 1	プラス1	Purasu Wan	Ciao	June 1986	Chisato Ichinose and Ichirō Imai have feelings for each other but are too shy to profess them. It takes a jerk to step in and help change the status quo.
7	9	Purple	むらさき	Murasaki	Ciao	June 1985	Murasaki just doesn't want to pick any side in all the conflicts between the beautiful school council president Minako Seito or the delinquent girl gangs of Akashi and Aota in school. But neutral doesn't mean spineless, and when there's a bully, he will stand up to them, which explains the seemingly odd charm that he has over all the girls. Still, there's one side he may like to be on: the side of the awkward Haruna Komiya.
8	4–5	What's Going On!?	なにがなんだか	Nani ga Nanda ka	Shōnen Big Comic	January 1985	Keiichi is on the way to a ski resort to see the girl with whom he has been corresponding in person, at the same time remains cautious by using a fake name, so that he can bail in case her look turns out not as pleasant and encouraging as what he imagines she sounds through the letters. Unfortunately for him, everyone at that resort agrees to play a game in which they all also use fake names and fake identities as a means of escapism.

=== Short Program 2 ===
The second collection, titled Short Program 2, collected stories published between 1988 and 1995. In Japan, Shogakukan published this in June 1996. In the United States, Viz Media published this collection in April 2004. Unlike the first volume, this collection was published right to left, in the now-standard paper size for manga.

Short Program 2				ISBN 4-09-121882-2 (original release)		
Short Program 2				ISBN 4-09-127872-8 (2005 re-release)		
(Canada) (United States) Short Program 2				ISBN 1-56931-473-X		
Chapter	English title	Japanese title	Rōmaji title	Serialized	Publication date	Summary
1	Before Spring Comes	春が来る前に...	Haru ga Kuru Mae ni...	Petit Comic	April 1992	Wakaba Moriyama gets a part-time assignment from her detective father: a spy mission that's unlike any of those intriguing stories in TV and movies. That is, she has to spy on a guy and that's all about it. As she yawns over her boring job, she discovers that what she's on gets intriguing all of a sudden and she may not even be the one who's doing the spying.
2	Subject - Wakaba	若葉マーク	Wakaba Māku	Weekly Young Sunday	January 1995	Detective Moriyama assigns his assistant to find out what Wakaba is up to lately. Apparently, she's been involving in some secret business with a married man. The evidence photos the assistant gets gives the detective a sigh of relief now that his potential son-in-law's powerful father's upset and doesn't approve of this prospect marriage with his daughter Wakaba, thinking this is a clever ruse his assistant has cooked up to scare off an unwanted suitor. The assistant refrains himself from reporting all of what he knows so far, only to find out that that's a right thing to do: not everything is as it seems.
3	A Stop on the Way	途中下車	Tochū Gesha	Weekly Shōnen Sunday	September 1994	16-year-old Wataru Matsumura is on his way to see the girl known as Akimi Sakura who was there to save his life, in order to profess his feelings for her. Unfortunately, he gets robbed right in the middle of the way. He's now stuck in a strange place, but fortunately, his classmate Keiko Komiya, who's working for her family's resort there, agrees to help him get a job so that he gets enough money to continue his travel to his true love. When he's done and starts boarding the next train, he chances on another classmate and finds out that he may not have to go anywhere else, after all.
4	5×4P			Big Comic Superior	July - September 1992	A collection of 5 shorter stories: 1 お茶をにごす: Various people chats about various things in this small coffee shop. The shopkeeper also seems to have a thing for his beautiful, flirtatious waitress. 2 おかわりいかがですか？: A gold-digging woman thinks she can get away with bribing her ex in exchange for his silence in this coffee shop. Unfortunately there are speakers everywhere, and her next victim hears everything from the bathroom. 3 ちょっとお客さん: The shopkeeper speaks to his waitress about the struggles that that manga artist over there must be enduring. 4 クリームソーダ: A businesswoman misses one of the most important meetings of her life, with her ex-husband and her son. She decides to cancel all other meetings and just sit there at this coffee shop. But the pair of father and son also have to come back because they've dropped their precious family-photo key fob. 5 立つ鳥 お茶をにごす: The shopkeeper asks his beautiful, flirtatious waitress out, not knowing that the phone call to his wife was on the whole time.
5	4 on the Richter Scale	震度4	Shindo Yon	Weekly Shōnen Sunday	July 1988	When he can't muster enough courage to give her his love letter, an earthquake gives him some help.
6	Aim at the Ace	エースをつぶせ!	Ēsu o Tsubuse!	Shōgaku Shinensei	June 1986	Disgraced coach Kageyama now has to wear all black and tries his best to stop a boy from wanting to play baseball, all because of a psychic's prophecy that if that boy ever becomes a baseball player, it'll be the end of the Cats team. But Kageyama can't help being skeptical and keeps "accidentally" coaching that boy time and time again.
7	Spring Call	スプリング・コール	Supuringu Kōru	Weekly Shōnen Sunday	April 1993	Kōhei Shinjō the genuinely nice guy has an idea for a play titled Spring Call, with a subtle ending that his classmate Nao agrees would make a great play. But when the club president Akahori abuses his power for his own opportunistic and intelligence-insulting play, Kōhei can no longer stay a spineless nice guy.
8	Spring Passes	ゆく春	Yuku Haru	Big Comic Spirits	May 1993	As Kenji Uehara watches a rugby game at his old high school with Tomomi Sakamoto, he recalls memories of his best friend Takayama who, on this day four years ago, died happily thinking Tomomi said yes to him. No one could get over the loss of a rugby talent, and a very good friend.
9	The Road Home	帰り道	Kaeri Michi	Young Sunday	October - November 1989	The Road Home 1: While playing hide-and-seek with his friends in the country, a little boy somehow gets lost in a strange urban area. It appears that he has traveled to the future. He's only able to mysteriously get back home in the pitch dark night. The Road Home 2: While on his way to cram school, a little boy finds himself stranded in the past. He manages to learn some cool things before getting back at class just in time.
10	Sayonara Game	サヨナラゲーム	Sayonara Gēmu	Big Comic	1991 Summer Special	He has made it at the last second so many times in his life. He really believes in his luck. But will luck help him win over her at the last second?

=== Short Program 3 ===
This volume was published in July 2007 in Japan.

Short Program 3				ISBN 4-09-127873-6		
Chapter	English title	Japanese title	Rōmaji title	Serialized	Publication date	Summary
1	Geta and Diamonds	下駄とダイヤモンド	Geta to Daiyamondo	Young Sunday	1999 issue 17	Young crime drama writer Kōhei Taguchi has to finish a draft for his TV producer under the supervision of his sister, Chiaki Shinjō, who makes sure he finishes it in time instead of slacking off, even though Kōhei is facing a creative block in that he has to come up with some salacious moments for the show per the producer's request. While he stays with Chiaki, he also notices her two guy friends might be up to something suspicious for her. However, she insists that they are the best friends anyone could have, and it's unacceptable of him to badmouth them. And she's not wrong, they've been planning something for both of them.
2	Blowing Any Which Way	どこ吹く風	Doko Fuku Kaze	Big Comic Spirits	1992 issue 8	Shōhei has a crush on Michiko, but never has the courage to tell her, because he doesn't know for sure whether she's into him at all, or Shin. On the other hand, Shin is notorious for coming up with the most ridiculous excuses, which makes it hard for Shōhei to believe him at times. But sometimes, believing your best friend just might give you a chance with the girl you love.
3	Angel's Hammer	天使のハンマー	Tenshi no Hanmā	Big Comic	1998 issue 6	Years after leaving his hometown, Toshimichi hasn't achieved the success that he had hoped. For the last couple of days, he's been on his way for a reunion with his childhood friends, who he's always regretted leaving due to family circumstances. At the moment, he just starts talking to a stranger about how he used to have fun with his friends, but most of all how he misses the smallest, clingiest one of them, Shinta, who was devastated the day he left. All Toshimichi's hoping now is to come to the reunion and see Shinta. For some people, time only gives them old age. For others, time could make familiar faces hardly recognizable.
4	Memory Off	メモリーオフ	Memorī Ofu	Weekly Shōnen Sunday	2000 issues 6-7 (2 parts)	This New Year, Toshino can't afford to go on vacation with his family because he's very busy cramming for college. He figures he will be doing homework uneventfully for some time, until a mysterious girl shows up at his door asking who she is while pointing a gun at him.
5	White Summer	白い夏	Shiroi Natsu	Weekly Shōnen Sunday	2002 issues 36–37	(Original story by Buronson); Detective Gorō Mikami has shown that he's not afraid of standing up to powerful people. At the same time, his old friend Tetsu is on the run for murder. Gorō keeps blaming himself for the mistakes he made during that critical baseball game, and he thinks that if his school team had won that day, Tetsu wouldn't be the way he is now, which is probably true, but Tetsu never hated Gorō for that. He's on the run for him.
6	Square Sea	四角い海	Shikakui Umi	Weekly Shōnen Sunday	1998 30th Anniversary Special Issue,	Kenta's really mad at his doofus dad, whose recklessness resulted in him breaking his leg and having to stay indoors all day until it heals. With help from the tiny alien Colonel Doremi from planet Pampers, he discovers beautiful nature that can only be appreciated outdoors.
7	Idol A	アイドルA	Aidoru Ēsu	Young Sunday	2005 issue 36/37 - 2007 issue 5/6 (2 parts)	Azusa Satomi isn't only a beauty, but also a natural-born pitcher. Keita Hirayama is good at... impersonation (usually as a party trick). Both of them couldn't be more different in every way, yet somehow they look exactly, eerily alike. Since Azusa can't play all the way to professional baseball as a girl, she and her coaching father beg Keita to trade places with her on the team so that she can make use of her baseball talent, while also having to maintain her modeling career. Now that they have to literally impersonate each other and lead double lives, the mishaps come.
8	The Runaway God	逃げた神様	Nigeta Kamisama	Big Comic One	16 October 2005	Mitsuru Adachi recounts some stories about his love for comics as a child and how he was inspired to become a comics artist.
9	Short Mail	ショートメール	Shōto Mēru	Shōnen Sunday Super	2006 Special Winter Issue	He wants to give her his love letter every time he passes by her, but never can't. So a bird poops on his letter and gives him some help.

=== Short Program: Girl's Type ===
This volume was published 11 May 2009 in Japan.

Short Program: Girl's type			ISBN 4-09-121674-9		
Chapter	English title	Japanese title	Rōmaji title	Serialized	Publication date
1	A Word from the Freeloader	居候よりひとこと	Isōrō yori Hitokoto	Weekly Shōjo Comic	1978 issue 11
2	A Word from the Freeloader, Continued	続・居候よりひとこと	Zoku Isōrō yori Hitokoto	Weekly Shōjo Comic	1978 issue 24
3	It's Hard Being a Freeloader	居候はつらいよ	Isōrō wa Tsurai yo	Weekly Shōjo Comic	1979 issue 2
4	Lovers Declaration	恋人宣言	Koibito Sengen	Shōnen Big Comic	1979 issue 22
5	Season	SEASON	Shīzun	Bessatsu Shōjo Comic	1983 issue 8
6	Pair of Aces	エースふたり	Ēsu Futari	Weekly Shōjo Comic	1978 issue 16
7	Whimsical Punch	気まぐれパンチ	Kimagure Panchi	Weekly Shōjo Comic	1977 issue 34

== Reception ==
The Wilamette Week's Jamie Rich called the first volume of Short Program "solid, escapist entertainment" and "as irresistibly infatuating as comic books can get." He described the worlds created by Adachi as "ageless", describing his style as having "crisp, delicate [lines]" and having a "genuine sweetness".

== Adaptation ==
A live-action series with the same name based on the manga was announced on December 13, 2021. The adaptation is produced by Atmovie Inc. and Lapone Entertainment as an 11-episodes anthology television drama, with the members of boy group JO1 alternately playing the male protagonist in each episode. It was premiered on Amazon Prime Video starting March 1, 2022.
