= Level Comics =

Indonesian publishing company

Established in 2005, Level Comics is a division of Elex Media Komputindo that publishes seinen, shonen with a strong violence, and also josei manga in Indonesia. Elex Media Komputindo has been publishing manga in Indonesia since 1990. As the readers of manga became more mature, Elex Media decided to start a new division that was more suitable and enjoyable for older manga readers. The first releases of Level Comics were Homunculus by Hideo Yamamoto, Vagabond by Takehiko Inoue, 20th Century Boys by Naoki Urasawa and X by Clamp.

== List of shonen comics published by Level Comics ==
- Air Gear, by Oh! great (completed)
- Akame ga Kill!, by Takahiro and Tetsuya Tashiro (completed)
- Attack on Titan, by Hajime Isayama (completed)
- Attack on Titan: Before the Fall, by Ryō Suzukaze and Satoshi Shiki (completed)
- Attack on Titan: Junior High School, by Saki Nakagawa (completed)
- Bloody Monday, by Ryō Ryūmon and Megumi Kouji (ongoing)
- Dandadan, by Yukinobu Tatsu (ongoing)
- Dark Edge, by Yu Aikawa (completed)
- Deadman Wonderland, by Kazuma Kondou and Jinsei Kataoka (completed)
- Doubt, by Yoshiki Tonogai (completed)
- Fight!! Ippo, by George Morikawa (ongoing)
- Future Diary, by Sakae Esuno (ongoing)
- Great Teacher Onizuka, by Tooru Fujisawa (completed)
- GTO Shonan 14 Days, by Tooru Fujisawa (completed)
- Gurren Lagann, by Kazuki Nakashima and Kotaro Mori (ongoing)
- Highschool of the Dead, by Daisuke Sato and Shoji Sato (completed)
- Kamiyadori, by Kei Sanbe (completed)
- Karakuri Circus, by Kazuhiro Fujita (ongoing)
- Negima! Magister Negi Magi, by Ken Akamatsu (ongoing)
- O-Parts Hunter, by Seishi Kishimoto (completed)
- Project ARMS, by Kyoichi Nanatsuki and Ryōji Minagawa (completed)
- Psychometrer Eiji, by Yuma Ando and Masashi Asaki (ongoing)
- Red Eyes, by Jun Shindo (completed)
- Rent a Girlfriend, by Reiji Miyajima (ongoing)
- Rumic World, by Rumiko Takahashi (ongoing)
- Shoot!, by Tsukasa Oshima (ongoing)
- Soul Eater, by Atsushi Ōkubo (ongoing)
- Togari, by Yoshinori Natsume (completed)
- Tokyo Revengers, by Ken Wakui (ongoing)

== List of seinen comics published by Level Comics ==
- 1 or W, by Rumiko Takahashi (one-shot)
- 20th Century Boys, by Naoki Urasawa (completed)
- 21st Century Boys, by Naoki Urasawa (completed)
- 3×3 Eyes, by Yuzo Takada (ongoing)
- A Spirit of the Sun, by Kaiji Kawaguchi (ongoing)
- Aflame Inferno, by Lim Dall-young and Kim Kwang-hyun (ongoing)
- Ai Kora, by Kazurou Inoue (completed)
- Akihabara@Deep, by Ira Ishida and Makoto Akane (completed)
- Aku/Boku, by Yasuhito Yamamoto (completed)
- All Rounder Meguru, by Hiroki Endo (ongoing)
- Angel Heart, by Tsukasa Hojo (ongoing)
- Bambino!, by Tetsuji Sekiya (ongoing)
- Basu Hashiru, by Mizu Sahara (one-shot)
- Black Lagoon, by Rei Hiroe (ongoing)
- Blade of the Immortal, by Hiroaki Samura (ongoing)
- Blade of the Phantom Master, by Youn In-wan and Yang Kyung-il (completed)
- Blame!, by Tsutomu Nihei (completed)
- Bōken Shōnen, by Mitsuru Adachi (one-shot)
- Brave Story, by Miyuki Miyabe and Yoichiro Ono (completed)
- A Bride's Story, by Kaoru Mori (ongoing)
- Cesare, by Fuyumi Soryo (ongoing)
- Cherry, by Eisaku Kubonouchi (ongoing)
- Chocolat, by Eisaku Kubonouchi (ongoing)
- Cruise, by Yajima Masao and Kikuta Hiroyuki (completed)
- Dandelion, by Naoyuki Ochiai (completed)
- Devil Devil, by Miyoshi Yuuki (completed)
- Death's Notice by Motoro Mase (completed)
- E' Dash/e', by Ashita Morimi (one-shot)
- Eagle: The Making of an Asian-American President, by Kaiji Kawaguchi (completed)
- Ergo Proxy: Centzon Hitchers and Undertaker, by Manglobe and Yumiko Harao (completed)
- ES (Eternal Sabbath), by Fuyumi Soryo (ongoing)
- Fire Investigator Nanase/Kasai Chousakan Nanase, by Izo Hashimoto and Tomoshige Ichikawa (ongoing)
- Fist of the Blue Sky, by Tetsuo Hara and Buronson (ongoing)
- Fly, Daddy, Fly, by Kazuki Kaneshiro and Manabu Akishige (completed)
- G -Gokudo Girl-, by Hidenori Hara and Buronson (completed)
- Genzo Hitogata Kiwa, by Yuzo Takada
- Go Go Hanasaki Detective Office/Go Go Kochira Shiritsu Hanasaki Tantei Jimusho, by Watanaru Watanabe (ongoing)
- Giant Killing, by Masaya Tsunamoto and Tsujitomo (ongoing)
- Great Edo City Report, by Yu Nakahara Yu and Enshu Takahashi (one-shot)
- Gunsmith Cats, by Kenichi Sonoda (completed)
- Gunsmith Cats Burst, by Kenichi Sonoda (completed)
- Happy Hello Work at Age 21!/Takunabi, by Katsumi Yamaguchi (ongoing)
- Haruka Seventeen, by Sayaka Yamazaki (ongoing)
- Hataraki Man, by Moyoko Anno (ongoing)
- Hellsing, by Kouta Hirano (completed)
- Historié, by Hitoshi Iwaaki (ongoing)
- Homunculus, by Hideo Yamamoto (completed)
- Hoshi no Furumachi, by Hidenori Hara (completed)
- Hunt for the Thumb/Oyayubi Sagashi, by Yamada Yusuke and Ayamura Kirihito (one-shot)
- Iliad, by Uoto Osamu and Toshusai Garaku (ongoing)
- Japan Sinks, by Sakyo Komatsu and Tokihiko Isshiki (ongoing)
- Jinbē, by Mitsuru Adachi (one-shot)
- Jormungand, by Keitarou Takahashi (completed)
- K2, by Kazou Mafune (ongoing)
- Kamisama Dolls, by Hajime Yamamura (completed)
- Karasuma Kyouko no Jikenbo, by Oji Hiroi and Yusuke Kozaki (ongoing)
- Kowloons Seekers, by Tomo Aoki (completed)
- Kurosagi, by Takeshi Natsuhara and Kuromaru (completed)
- Last Inning, by Ryu Kamio and Yu Nakahara (ongoing)
- Les Gouttes de Dieu, by Tadashi Agi and Shu Okimoto (ongoing)
- Line, by Yua Kotegawa (one-shot)
- Little Jumper, by Yuzo Takada (completed)
- Lost Man, by Kusaba Michiteru (ongoing)
- Maison Ikkoku, by Rumiko Takahashi (completed)
- Master of Sea/Waga na wa Umishi, by Yuji Takemura and Yoichi Komiri (completed)
- Ministry of Finance/Genzaikan Ryoukei Mofu, by Yoshio Nabeta and Hiromi Namiki (completed)
- Moon, by Soda Masahito and Tomiyama Kuro (ongoing)
- My Favorite Bike, by Katsumi Yamaguchi (completed)
- NOiSE, by Tsutomu Nihei (one-shot)
- Nurse Aoi/Ns' Aoi, by Ryo Koshino (ongoing)
- Officer Monju/Seigi Keikan Monju, by Hiroki Miyashita (ongoing)
- Ole!, by Nohda Tatsuki (completed)
- Onsen Paradise/Kirikiritei no Buraun Sensei, by Shota Kikuchi (ongoing)
- Over Rev!, by Katsumi Yamaguchi and Team39 (completed)
- Pandemic, by Masasumi Kakizaki (one-shot)
- Priest, by Hyung Min-woo (ongoing)
- Psycho Trader Chinami, by Akihiro Kimura (completed)
- Rainbow: Nisha Rokubō no Shichinin, by George Abe and Masasumi Kakizaki (completed)
- RED, by Kenichi Muraeda (completed)
- Regatta Kimi to Ita Eien, by Hidenori Hara (completed)
- Restore Garage 251, by Ryuji Tsugihara (ongoing)
- Revolution No. 3, by Kazuki Kaneshiro and Manabu Akishige (completed)
- Rooster Fighter by Shū Sakuratani (ongoing)
- RRR, by Jun Watanabe (ongoing)
- Sayonara Papa, by Shin Takahashi
- Seizon Life, by Nobuyuki Fukumoto and Kaiji Kawaguchi (completed)
- Shadow Skill, by Megumu Okada (ongoing)
- Shin Hoero Pen, by Kazuhiko Shimamoto (ongoing)
- Show Me The Money/Qiang Qian Nue Shen, by Lin Xin Ying (completed)
- SORA! -Flight Attendant Monogatari-, by Yajima Masao and Hikino Shinji (completed)
- Speed, by Kazuki Kaneshiro and Manabu Akishige (completed)
- Subaru, by Masahito Soda (completed)
- Suna-ku Gari, by Miyuki Miyabe and Ohishi Hiroto (completed)
- Team Medical Dragon, by Akira Nagai and Taro Nogizaka (completed)
- Tetsuzin, by Toshihiko Yahagi and Naoyuki Ochiai (completed)
- The Ravages of Time, by Chan Mou (ongoing)
- Tokei Ibun, by Fuyumi Ono and Kajiwara Niki (completed)
- Tokyo 23, by Takeshi Arashida and Eiji Hashim (completed)
- Tomo'o/Danchi Tomoo, by Oda Tobira (ongoing)
- Toubou Bengoshi Narita Makoto, by Yu Takada Yu and Hideki Go (ongoing)
- Trafficker, by Yatsunaga Mitsunori (completed)
- Train Man: Densha Otoko, by Hidenori Hara (completed)
- Under the Rose - Haru no Sanka, by Akari Funato (ongoing)
- Until Death Do Us Part, by Hiroshi Takashige and DOUBLE-S (ongoing)
- Vagabond, by Takehiko Inoue (ongoing)
- Wilderness, by Akihiro Ito (ongoing)
- X-Blade, by Ida Tatsuhiko (completed)
- xxxHolic, by Clamp (completed)
- Yokohama China Town Fantasy/Kachuu Hana, by Yuuji Nishi and Shinji Hikino (completed)
- Yugo, by Shinji Makari and Shū Akana (completed)
- Zenith, by Yoshida Satoshi (completed)
- Zipang, by Kaiji Kawaguchi (ongoing)
- Zom 100: Bucket List of the Dead, by Haro Aso (ongoing)

== List of shōjo and josei comics published by Level Comics ==
- 16 Engage, by Kaho Miyasaka (completed)
- 16-sai Kiss, by Kaho Miyasaka (one-shot)
- 17 Sai No Real/My Real 17, by Yukari Kawachi
- A Perfect Day for Love Letters, by George Asakura (completed)
- Anata ga Ireba, by Akemi Yoshimura (completed)
- Ao no Fūin, by Chie Shinohara
- Baby Pop, by Yayoi Ogawa (completed)
- Baby-Sitter Gin!, by Waki Yamato (ongoing)
- Basara, by Yumi Tamura (ongoing)
- Binetsu Shōjo, by Kaho Miyasaka (completed)
- Blue Seal, by Chie Shinohara (ongoing)
- Bokutachi wa Shitte Shimatta, by Kaho Miyasaka (ongoing)
- Bond/Kizuna, by Reiko Momochi (completed)
- Bronze Angel, by Chiho Saito (ongoing)
- Dawn of The Arcana, by Rei Toma (ongoing)
- Daydreaming, by Yoshimura Akemi (ongoing)
- Descendants of Darkness, by Yoko Matsushita (ongoing)
- Desert Love, by Sachimi Riho (one-shot)
- Diamond Life, by Akira Fujiwara (completed)
- Duke and I/Koushaku to Watashi, by Chieko Hara (one-shot)
- Escape Express, by Chie Shinohara (one-shot)
- Exit, by Takami Fujita (ongoing)
- Forgive Me Cinnamon/Gomen ne Cinnamon, by Natsuko Hamaguchi (one-shot)
- Fullmoon Honeymoon, by Chieko Hara (one-shot)
- Ghost Mum Investigator, by Sato Tomokazu (ongoing)
- Glass Chair/Garasu no Isu, by Mariko Nakamura (ongoing)
- Gokusen, by Kozueko Morimoto (completed)
- Grass Crown/Kusakanmuri no Namae, by Akemi Yoshimura (one-shot)
- Hagoromo Mishin, by Yuki Kodama (one-shot)
- Half an Apple/1/2 no Ringo, by Koyama Yukari (ongoing)
- Hana-Kimi, by Hisaya Nakajo (completed)
- Honey Hunt, by Miki Aihara (ongoing)
- Honoka ni Purple, by Chiho Saito (ongoing)
- Hotaru no Hikari, by Satoru Hiura (ongoing)
- Ice Forest, by Chiho Saito (ongoing)
- Imademo Yume ni Miru, by Akemi Yoshimura (one-shot)
- Kare First Love, by Kaho Miyasaka (completed)
- Kiss in the Blue, by Kaho Miyasaka (completed)
- Life, by Keiko Suenobu (completed)
- Little Devil Cafe/Koakuma Cafe, by Oda Aya (completed)
- Love of Sue St. Mary, by Kyoko Fumizuki (one-shot)
- Misaki 1 No. 01, by Fujisaki Masato (ongoing)
- Miso-Com/30 Kon Miso-com, by Rika Yonezawa (ongoing)
- My Lovely Honey/Barairo My Honey, by Tomu Ohmi (completed)
- Oboreru Knife, by George Asakura (ongoing)
- Oh Butterfly Oh Flower/Chou yo Hana yo, by Yuki Yoshihara (ongoing)
- Othello, by Satomi Ikezawa (completed)
- Pet Shop of Horrors, by Matsuri Akino (ongoing)
- Red River, by Chie Shinohara (completed)
- Rumour, by Reiko Momochi
- Second Engage, by Aikawa Momoko (one-shot)
- Secret, by Reiko Momochi
- Shinayaka ni Kizutsuite, by Miyuki Kitagawa (completed)
- Shōnen Shōjo Romance, by George Asakura (completed)
- Sky of Love, by Ibuki Haneda (ongoing)
- Sweet Life, by Kyoko Fumizuki
- Tensai Family Company, by Tomoko Ninomiya (completed)
- The Strange Florist, by Yohna (one-shot)
- The Tale of Genji, by Waki Yamato (ongoing)
- The Wallflower, by Tomoko Hayakawa (ongoing)
- Though I Can't See You/Kimi ga Mienakutemo, by Masami Nagareda (ongoing)
- To Be Beautiful/Kirei ni Naritai!, by Miyuki Yorita (completed)
- Tobira, by Reiko Momochi
- Tokyo Juliet, by Miyuki Kitagawa (completed)
- Triple Kiss/Shimaki Ako (completed)
- Umi Yori mo Fukaku, by Akemi Yoshimura (ongoing)
- Under the Rain/Ame ni Nurete mo, by Honda Keiko (one-shot)
- Warui Otoko, by Akemi Yoshimura (one-shot)
- X, by Clamp (ongoing)

== List of Harlequin comics published by Level Comics ==
In 2006, Level Comics published Harlequin Comics, which are comics that are adapted from Harlequin novels by Japanese manga artists. The titles that have been published in this line are:

- A Business Engagement, by Jessica Steele and Junko Matsufuji
- A Flawed Marriage, by Penny Jordan and atomu
- An Honorable Thief, by Anne Gracie and Yōko Hanabusa
- An Impossible Dream, by Emma Darcy
- Dark Heritage, by Emma Darcy and Maki Ohsawa
- Emma and the Earl, by Paula Marshall and Chieko Hara
- Free Spirit, by Penny Jordan and Ao Chimura
- Knight to the Rescue, by Miranda Lee and Yoko Hanabusa
- Lady Linford's Return, by Anne Ashley and Yoko Hanabusa
- Marriage Without Love, by Penny Jordan and Ayako Shibata
- On the Way to a Wedding, by Inggrid Weaver and Mao Karino
- The Case of Mesmerizing Boss, by Diana Palmer and Harumo Sanasaki
- The Case of the Confirmed Bachelor, by Diana Palmer and Harumo Sanasaki
- The Case of the Missing Secretary, by Diana Palmer and Harumo Sanasaki
- The Patient Nurse, by Diana Palmer and Misao Hoshiai
- The Power and the Passion, by Emma Darcy and Yoko Hanabusa
- The Sheikh's Seduction, by Emma Darcy and Hiroko Miura
- Wedding Fever, by Lee Wilkinson and Atomu
- Wrong Mirror, by Emma Darcy and Takako Hashimoto
