= List of Ikigami: The Ultimate Limit chapters =

Ikigami: The Ultimate Limit is a Japanese manga series written and illustrated by Motoro Mase. The manga was serialized in Shogakukan's Weekly Young Sunday until the magazine ended on July 31, 2008. The serialization of the manga continued in Shogakukan's Big Comic Spirits from its 41st issue. Shogakukan released the manga's ten tankōbon volumes between August 5, 2005, and March 30, 2012. The manga is licensed in North America by Viz Media, which released the first tankōbon volume on May 12, 2009. The manga is also licensed in France by Asuka, in Spain and Italy by Panini Comics, in Taiwan by Sharp Point Press, in Korea by Haksan Culture Company, in Poland by Hanami, and Indonesia by Level Comics

The series has been collected into 10 tankōbon volumes, which have been republished in English.

== Volume list ==
No.	Original release date	Original ISBN	English release date	English ISBN
1	August 5, 2005	978-4-09-153281-7	May 12, 2009	978-1-4215-2678-2
Episode 1: "The Results Of Revenge" (復讐の果て, Fukushū no hate): Act1; Act2; Act3; Episode 2: "Forgotten Song" (忘れられた歌, Wasure rareta uta): Act1; Act2; Act3
2	April 5, 2006	978-4-09-153281-7	August 11, 2009	978-1-4215-2679-9
Episode 3: "The Drug Of Pure Love" (純愛ドラッ, Jun'ai dora~tsu): Act1; Act2; Act3; Episode 4: "The Night Before Leaving For War" (出征前夜, Shussei zen'ya): Act1; Act2; Act3
3	December 28, 2006	978-4-09-151149-2	November 10, 2009	978-1-4215-2680-5
Episode 5: "Life Out of Control" (命の暴走, Inochi no bōsō): Act1; Act2; Act3; Episode 6: "The Loveliest Lie" (最愛の嘘, Saiai no uso): Act1; Act2; Act3
4	September 5, 2007	978-4-09-151227-7	February 9, 2010	978-1-4215-2681-2
Episode 7: "The Last Lesson" (最後の授業, Saigonojugyō): Act1; Act2; Act3; Episode 8: "A Peaceful Place" (安らかなる場所, Yasurakanaru basho): Act1; Act2; Act3
5	May 2, 2008	978-4-09-151332-8	May 11, 2010	978-1-4215-3165-6
Episode 9: "The Writing On The Wall" (塗りつぶされた魂, Nuritsubusa reta tamashī): Act1; Act2; Act3; Episode 10: "Honor And Duty" (国繁原理主義, Kunishige genri shugi): Act1; Act2; Act3
6	November 28, 2008	978-4-09-151405-9	August 10, 2010	978-1-4215-3166-3
Episode 11: "Life Papers" (生きる紙, Ikiru kami): Act1; Act2; Act3; Episode 12: "The Truth Exposed" (曝かれた真実, Kareta shinjitsu): Act1; Act2; Act3
7	September 30, 2009	978-4-09-151473-8	August 09, 2011	978-1-4215-3668-2
Episode 13: "Photo Of The Deceased" (遺影, Iei): Act1; Act2; Act3; Episode 14: "The Dream I Tried To Make Come True" (叶えようとした夢, Kanaeyou to shita yume): Act1; Act2; Act3
8	July 30, 2010	978-4-09-151496-7	August 14, 2012	978-1-4215-4188-4
Episode 15: "Crime And Punishment" (罪と罰, Tsumitobachi): Act1; Act2; Act3; Episode 16: "The True Face Of Love" (初恋の素顔, Hatsukoi no sugao): Act1; Act2; Act3
9	June 30, 2011	978-4-09-151526-1	August 30, 2013	978-1-4215-5307-8
Episode 17: "National Welfare Immunization" (国繁予防接種, Kunishige yobō sesshu): Act1; Act2; Act3; Episode 18: "Two Fallen War" (二人の戦没者, Futari no senbotsu-sha): Act1; Act2; Act3
10	March 30, 2012	978-4-09-151536-0	August 19, 2014	978-1-4215-6641-2
Episode 19: "Entrusted Words" (託された言葉, Takusa reta kotoba): Act1; Act2; Act3; Episode 20: "The Phantom Country" (幻の国, Maboroshi no kuni): Act1; Act2; Act3

== Ikigami: Sairin ==
No.	Japanese release date	Japanese ISBN
1	June 30, 2022	978-4-09-861316-8
