= List of Densha Otoko chapters =

The cover of the first volume of Train_Man: Densha Otoko as published by Shogakukan on April 5, 2005 in Japan.

There are four manga adaptations of the Densha Otoko novel. All four adaptations are based on the purportedly true story of a 23-year-old otaku who intervened when a drunk man was harassing several women on a train. The otaku ultimately begins dating one of the women. The four adaptations in order of publication are Train_Man: Densha Otoko by Hidenori Hara; Densha Otoko: The Story of a Train Man Who Fell in Love With A Girl by Wataru Watanabe; Train_Man: Go, Poison Man! written by Hitori Nakano and illustrated by Daisuke Dōke and Train_Man: A Shōjo Manga by Machiko Ocha.

== Volume list ==
=== Train_Man: Densha Otoko ===
Train_Man: Densha Otoko (電車男〜ネット発、各駅停車のラブストーリー〜, Densha Otoko: Net-hatsu, Kakueki-teisha no Love Story; "Train_Man: Internet, Local Train Love Story") is written and illustrated by Hidenori Hara. It was serialized in Shogakukan's Young Sunday from January 6, 2005. Shogakukan released the manga's three tankōbon volumes between April 5, 2005, and September 5, 2005. It was licensed in North America by Viz Media, which released the manga's three tankōbon volumes between October 10, 2006, and February 13, 2007. It is licensed in France by Kurokawa, in Spain by Glènat España and in Germany by Carlsen Comics.

No.	Original release date	Original ISBN	English release date	English ISBN
1	April 5, 2005	4-091-53211-X	October 10, 2006	1-4215-0848-6
01. "The Birth of Densha Otoko" (電車男、誕生); 02. "Bet or Not?" (かける？ かけない？); 03. "Step Forward, Densha Otoko!!" (進め、電車男!!); 04. "Can't Take It Any More..." (もうだめぽ…); 05. "Adventures of Densha Otoko" (電車男の冒険); 06. "Is This the End?" (終わっちゃうんだ…); 07. "Can We End This?" (終わりにできる？); 08. "Densha Otoko's Sigh" (電車男のため息…); 09. "Do You Love Her?" (好 き で す か？)
2	June 3, 2005	4-091-53212-8	December 12, 2006	1-4215-0849-4
01. "Good Job, Densha Otoko"; 02. "Are You Okay?"; 03. "Densha Otoko, Excited"; 04. "I Love You..."; 05. "Tell Me..."; 06. "Densha Otoko Gets Carried Away"; 07. "I've Said It..."; 08. "Feels Like It"; 09. "The Decisive Stage"
3	September 5, 2005	4-091-53213-6	October 10, 2006	1-4215-0848-6
01. "May 4th"; 02. "Densha Otoko loses steam"; 03. "Sounds like a good place..."; 04. "May 8th"; 05. "I'm back"; 06. "Don't forget, Densha Otoko"; 07. " "; 08. "Thank you"; 09. "Densha Otoko departs"

=== Densha Otoko: The Story of a Train Man Who Fell in Love With A Girl ===
Densha Otoko: The Story of a Train Man Who Fell in Love With A Girl (電車男〜でも、俺旅立つよ.〜, Densha Otoko: Demo, Ore Tabidatsuyo) is written and illustrated by Wataru Watanabe. It was serialized in Akita Shoten's Champion Red from January 19, 2005. Akita Shoten released the manga's three tankōbon volumes between March 20, 2005, and February 20, 2006. The manga is licensed in North America by CMX, which released the manga's three tankōbon volumes between October 11, 2006, and April 30, 2007. It is licensed in France by Taifu Comics.

No.	Original release date	Original ISBN	English release date	English ISBN
1	March 20, 2005	4-253-23151-9	October 11, 2006	978-1-4012-1141-7
2	September 20, 2005	4-253-23152-7	January 10, 2007	978-1-4012-1142-4
3	February 20, 2006	4-253-23153-5	April 30, 2007>	978-1-4012-1143-1

=== Train_Man: Go, Poison Man! ===
Train_Man: Go, Poison Man! (電車男 がんばれ毒男!, Densha Otoko: Ganbare Doku Otoko!) is written by Hitori Nakano and illustrated by Daisuke Dōke. It was serialized in Akita Shoten's Weekly Shōnen Champion from December 28, 2004. Akita Shoten released the manga's three tankōbon volumes between March 20, 2005, and January 20, 2006. It is available in English as a scanlation.

No.	Release date	ISBN
1	March 20, 2005	4-253-14921-9
2	September 20, 2005	4-253-14922-7
3	January 20, 2006	4-253-23153-5

=== Train_Man: A Shōjo Manga ===
Train_Man: A Shōjo Manga (電車男〜美女と純情ヲタク青年のネット発ラブストーリー, Densha Otoko: Bijo to Junjō Otaku Seinen no Net-hatsu Love Story; "Train_Man: Beauty and the Simple Otaku-Boy, an Internet Love Story") is a one shot shōjo manga written and illustrated by Machiko Ocha. Kodansha released the manga on June 13, 2005. The manga is licensed in North America by Del Rey Manga, which released the manga on November 7, 2006.

No.	Original release date	Original ISBN	English release date	English ISBN
1	June 13, 2005	978-4-06-365325-0	November 7, 2006	978-0-345-49619-5
