= R-17 (TV series) =

- Based on: Confidential Confessions
- Starring: Chiaki Kuriyama; Miki Nakatani; Yuma Ishigaki
- Country of origin: Japan

Original release
- Network: TV Asahi
- Release: 2001 – 2001

R-17 is a 2001 Japanese TV series broadcast on TV Asahi with Chiaki Kuriyama as Saori Maruyama, Miki Nakatani and Yuma Ishigaki. It is based on the manga Confidential Confessions by Reiko Momochi.

== Cast ==
- Miki Nakatani as Megumi Moriyama
- Kaori Momoi
- Seiichi Tanabe
- Yū Kurosawa (Akira Kurosawa's granddaughter)
- Masahiko Nishimura

episodes 1 and 2

- Chiaki Kuriyama as Saori Maruyama
- Yutaka Matsushige
- Mariko Tsutsui

episodes 3 and 4

- Asami Mizukawa as Keiko Miyauchi

episodes 5 and 6

- Aoi Miyazaki as Yukari Nomura

episodes 7, 8 and 9

- Mika Mifune (Toshiro Mifune's daughter) as Kyoko Nishimoto
