= List of 20th Century Boys chapters =

Cover of the first tankōbon volume, as published by Shogakukan on January 29, 2000

Written and illustrated by Naoki Urasawa, 20th Century Boys was originally serialized in Big Comic Spirits from 1999 to 2006. The 249 individual chapters were published into 22 tankōbon volumes by Shogakukan from January 29, 2000, to November 30, 2006. A sequel, titled 21st Century Boys, started in Big Comic Spirits's January 19, 2007, issue and ran until July. The 16 chapters were released into 2 volumes on May 30, 2007, and September 28, 2007. A one-shot manga titled Aozora Chu-Ihō ("Blue Sky Advisory — Kiss") was published in the February 2009 issue of Big Comic Spirits, it was credited to "Ujiko-Ujio", the pen-name of the fictional manga creator duo Kaneko and Ujiki in 20th Century Boys.

The manga was licensed for an English language release in North America by Viz Media in 2005, however their release was delayed until after their translation of Monster had finished. The first volume was released on February 17, 2009, and the last volume was released on September 18, 2012. The series was also released in Germany by Planet Manga, in France by Génération Comics, in Hong Kong by Jade Dynasty, in the Netherlands by Glénat, in Indonesia by Level Comics, in Italy by Planet Manga, in Poland by Hanami, in South Korea by Haksan Publishing, in Spain by Planeta DeAgostini, and in Taiwan by Tong Li Comics.

== 20th Century Boys ==
No.	Title	Original release date	North American release date
1	Friends; Tomodachi (ともだち)	January 29, 2000; 978-4-09-185531-2	February 17, 2009; 978-1-59116-922-2
1. "Friends" (ともだち, Tomodachi); 2. "Karaoke" (カラオケ); 3. "The Boy Who Bought A Guitar" (ギターを買った少年, Gitā o katta shōnen); 4. "Snot Rag" (鼻水タオル, Hanamizu taoru); 5. "Night in the Science Lab" (理科室の夜, Rikashitsu no yoru); 6. "Flag on the Moon" (月に立つ顔, Tsuki ni tatsu kao; "Face on the Moon"); 7. "Softball" (ソフトボール, Sofutobōru); 8. "Digging a Hole" (穴を掘る, Ana o horu); 9. "Message" (メッセージ, Messēji); 10. "Yukiji" (ユキジ)
2	The Prophet; Yogensha (予言者)	May 30, 2000; 978-4-09-185532-9	April 21, 2009; 978-1-59116-926-0
1. "'Amiability'" (“ゆうりき”, "Yūriki"); 2. "Otcho" (相撲, Sumō; "Sumo"); 3. "Cho-san" (刑事, Keiji; "Detective"); 4. "Yama-san" (ヤマさん); 5. "Humanity's Final Hour" (人類滅亡の時, Jinrui metsubō no toki); 6. "Kamisama" (神様); 7. "Kiriko's Desk Drawer" (姉貴の引き出し, Aneki no hikidashi); 8. "Kiriko's Boyfriend" (姉貴の恋人, Aneki no koibito); 9. "The Man Behind" (後ろの男, Ushiro no otoko); 10. "The Prophet" (予言者, Yogensha); 11. "Open Your Eyes!!" (目を覚ませ!!, Me o samase!!)
3	Hero With A Guitar; Gitā o motta eiyū (ギターを持った英雄)	August 30, 2000; 978-4-09-185533-6	June 16, 2009; 978-1-4215-1922-7
1. "Hero With A Guitar" (ギターを持った英雄, Gitā o motta eiyū); 2. "Resolve" (決意, Ketsui); 3. "Confrontation" (対決, Taiketsu); 4. "Brother" (ブラザー, Burazā); 5. "Classmates" (クラスメート, Kurasumēto); 6. "Someone Else..." (もう一人…, Mō hitori...); 7. "Sadakiyo" (サダキヨ); 8. "Airport Bomb" (空港爆破, Kūkō bakuha); 9. "Destiny's Child" (運命の子, Unmei no ko); 10. "And Then..." (それから…, Sorekara...); 11. "The Guy in Bangkok" (バンコクの男, Bankoku no otoko)
4	Love and Peace; Ai to heiwa (愛と平和)	January 30, 2001; 978-4-09-185534-3	August 18, 2009; 978-1-4215-1923-4
1. "FDP" (ゆーみん党, Yūmin-tō); 2. "Flight" (逃走, Tōsō); 3. "Connection" (つながり, Tsunagari); 4. "Love and Peace" (愛と平和, Ai to heiwa); 5. "Rainbow Kid" (七色キッド, Nanairo kiddo); 6. "Light" (光, Hikari); 7. "Blowup" (爆破, Bakuha); 8. "Secret Headquarters" (秘密基地, Himitsu kichi); 9. "Robot Conference" (ロボット会議, Robotto kaigi); 10. "King of the Underground" (地下の帝王, Chika no teiō); 11. "The Darkness Beyond" (闇の奥, Yami no oku)
5	Reunion; Saikai (さいかい)	April 26, 2001; 978-4-09-185535-0	October 20, 2009; 978-1-4215-2340-8
1. "Call to Arms" (招集, Shōshū); 2. "Not Alone" (ひとりじゃない, Hitori ja nai); 3. "Uncle Kenji" (ケンヂおじちゃん, Kenji-ojichan); 4. "Signal" (のろし, Noroshi); 5. "December 31" (12月31日, Jūnigatsu sanjūichinichi); 6. "Final Round" (さいしゅうかい, Saishūkai); 7. "Reunion" (さいかい, Saikai); 8. "Memorial" (記念碑, Kinenhi); 9. "Detective Chono" (蝶野刑事, Chōno-keiji); 10. "Chocho" (ちょーちょ, Chōcho); 11. "The Ambitious Duo" (ふたりの大志, Futari no taishi)
6	Final Hope; Saigo no kibō (最後の希望)	July 30, 2001; 978-4-09-185536-7	December 15, 2009; 978-1-4215-2341-5
1. "Witness" (目撃者, Mokugekisha); 2. "The Real Killer" (真犯人, Shinhannin); 3. "Umihotaru" (海ほたる); 4. "Monster" (バケモノ, Bakemono); 5. "Tunnel" (トンネル, Tonneru); 6. "Being Chased" (追い詰められて…, Oitsumerarete...); 7. "A Powerful Ally" (強い味方, Tsuyoi mikata); 8. "Good Luck Charm" (お守り, Omamori); 9. "The Last Hope" (最後の希望, Saigo no kibō); 10. "The Great Escape" (大脱走, Daidassō); 11. "A Test of Courage" (キモダメシ, Kimodameshi)
7	The Truth; Shinjitsu (真実)	October 30, 2001; 978-4-09-185537-4	February 16, 2010; 978-1-4215-2342-2
1. "Escape" (脱出, Dasshutsu); 2. "Air" (空気, Kūki); 3. "Landing" (上陸, Jōriku); 4. "The Fair of Dreams" (夢の博覧会; Yume no hakurankai); 5. "Koizumi" (コイズミ); 6. "God's Autograph" (神様のサイン, Kamisama no sain); 7. "Truth" (真実, Shinjitsu); 8. "Control Room" (コントロールルーム, Kontorōru rūmu); 9. "Showdown" (対面, Taimen); 10. "Fukubei" (フクベエ, Fukubee); 11. "Entry" (突入, Totsunyū)
8	Kenji's Song; Kenji no uta (ケンヂの歌)	February 28, 2002; 978-4-09-185538-1	May 25, 2010; 978-1-4215-2343-9
1. "Decision" (すだれ, Sudare; "Bamboo Screen"); 2. "Robot" (ガラクタ, Garakuta; "Junk"); 3. "Kenji's Song" (ケンヂの歌, Kenji no uta); 4. "Your Ride" (お迎え, Omukae); 5. "Tomodachi Land" (ともだちランド, Tomodachi Rando); 6. "Escape" (裏の世界, Ura no sekai; "Opposite Side of the World"); 7. "A Request" (頼み, Tanomi); 8. "Grades" (成績発表, Seiseki happyō); 9. "The Plan" (夏休み, Natsu yasumi; "Summer Vacation"); 10. "The Hanging Hill" (屋敷の怪, Yashiki no kai; "Mystery of the Mansion"); 11. "Voices Speaking" (秘密, Himitsu; "Secret")
9	Rabbit Nobokov; Rabitto Nabokofu (ラビット・ナボコフ)	June 29, 2002; 978-4-09-185539-8	June 15, 2010; 978-1-4215-2344-6
1. "Don't Look" (見ちゃいけない, Mitcha ikenai); 2. "Nightmare" (悪夢, Akumu); 3. "Real Fight" (本気勝負, Honki shōbu); 4. "Rabbit Nabokov" (ラビット・ナボコフ, Rabitto Nabokofu); 5. "ESP" (超能力, Chōnōryoku); 6. "Confessions" (告白, Kokuhaku); 7. "The New Book of Prophecy" (しんよげんの書, Shin'yogen no sho); 8. "On the Pulpit" (壇上, Danjō); 9. "Savior" (救世主, Kyūseishu); 10. "The Assassination" (暗殺の時, Ansatsu no toki); 11. "The Assassin's Bullet" (凶弾の時, Kyodan no toki)
10	The Faceless Boy; Kao no nai shōnen (顔のない少年)	August 30, 2002; 978-4-09-185540-4	August 17, 2010; 978-1-4215-2345-3
1. "Ceasefire" (停戦, Teisen); 2. "Crossroads" (クロスロード, Kurosurōdo); 3. "Surveillance" (監視, Kanshi); 4. "A New Teacher" (新しい先生, Atarashii sensei); 5. "Terrifying Answer" (恐怖の解答, Kyōfu no kaitō); 6. "Collector" (コレクター, Korekutā); 7. "Soliloquy" (独り言, Hitorigoto); 8. "Room of a Friend" (友人の部屋, Yūjin no heya); 9. "Boy Without a Face" (顔のない少年, Kao no nai shōnen); 10. "Boy With a Face" (顔のある少年, Kao no aru shōnen); 11. "Thunder" (雷鳴, Raimei)
11	List of Ingredients; Seibun hyōji (成分表示)	December 25, 2002; 978-4-09-186631-8	October 19, 2010; 978-1-4215-2346-0
1. "An Abyss of Despair" (絶望の淵, Zetsubō no fuchi); 2. "List of Ingredients" (成分表示, Seibun hyōji); 3. "The Lie of 1970" (1970年の, Senkyūhyakunanajū-nen no); 4. "Old Friendship" (旧交, Kyūkō); 5. "Complete Devotion" (全身全霊, Zenshinzenrei); 6. "Aliens" (宇宙人, Uchūjin); 7. "Sadakiyo's Decision" (サダキヨの決意, Sadakiyo no ketsui); 8. "Ruins" (廃墟, Haikyo); 9. "Godzilla" (ゴジラ, Gojira); 10. "Mother's Words" (母の言葉, Haha no kotoba); 11. "Yamane-kun" (ヤマネ君); 12. "Memories of the Science Room" (理科室の思い出, Rikashitsu no omoide)
12	Friend's Face; Tomodachi no kao (ともだちの顔)	March 29, 2003; 978-4-09-186632-5	December 21, 2010; 978-1-4215-2365-1
1. "Different New Year's Eve" (それぞれの大みそか, Sorezore no Ōmisoka); 2. "Pilgrimage" (参拝, Sanpai; "Worship"); 3. "Self-Destruction" (自爆, Jibaku); 4. "A Secret Connection" (秘密の連絡, Himitsu no renraku); 5. "Library" (図書室, Toshokan); 6. "Science Room" (理科室, Rikashitsu); 7. "Under the Alcohol Lamp" (アルコールランプの下, Arukōruranpu no shita); 8. "Him" (その男, Sono otoko); 9. "Gunshot 1" (銃声1, Jūsei 1); 10. "Gunshot 2" (銃声2, Jūsei 2); 11. "The Real Gunshot" (銃声の正体, Jūsei no shōtai); 12. "The Face of a Friend" (ともだちの顔, Tomodachi no kao)
13	Beginning of the End; Owari no Hajimari (終わりの始まり)	June 30, 2003; 978-4-09-186633-2	February 15, 2011; 978-1-4215-3531-9
1. "An Unremembered Man" (記憶にない男, Kioku ni Nai Otoko); 2. "Friend's Death" (ともだちの死, Tomodachi no Shi); 3. "Round Table Meeting" (円卓の会議, Entaku no Kaigi); 4. "A Time of Reunions" (再会の時, Saikai no Toki); 5. "Confessions in 2003" (2003年の告白, 2003-nen no Kokuhaku); 6. "A Real Man" (ホンモノ, Honmono no Otoko); 7. "The Beginning of the End" (終わりの始まり, Owari no Hajimari); 8. "The Frog Empire Strikes Back 1" (蛙帝国の逆襲1, Kaeru Teikoku no Gyakushū 1); 9. "The Frog Empire Strikes Back 2" (蛙帝国の逆襲2, Kaeru Teikoku no Gyakushū 2); 10. "A Quiet Town in Germany" (ドイツの静かな町, Doitsu no Shizukana Machi); 11. "A Stealthily Approaching Terror" (忍び寄る恐怖, Shinobiyoru Kyōfu); 12. "New Orders" (新たなる指令, Aratanaru Shirei)
14	The Boy and a Dream; Shōnen to Yume (少年と夢)	September 5, 2003; 978-4-09-186634-9	April 19, 2011; 978-1-4215-3532-6
1. "Memorial" (追悼式, Tsuitō-shiki); 2. "The True 1971" (本当の1971, Hontō no 1971-nen); 3. "Evil Emperor" (悪の大魔王, Aku no Dai Maō); 4. "Intruder" (侵入者, Shin'nyū-sha); 5. "The Day He Saw Something" (何かが見えた日, Nanika ga Mieta Hi); 6. "The Spoon-bender" (スプーン曲げの男, Supūn Mage no Otoko); 7. "Science Room, 1971" (1971年の理科室, 1971-nen no Rika-shitsu); 8. "Encounter with the Past" (過去との邂逅, Kako to no Kaigō); 9. "Identity" (正体, Shōtai); 10. "Warped Memories" (ゆがんだ記憶, Yuganda Kioku); 11. "My Summer Vacation" (僕の夏休み, Boku no Natsuyasumi); 12. "Youth and Dreams" (少年と夢, Shōnen to Yume)
15	Expo Hurray; Ban Paku Banzai (ばんぱくばんざい)	December 25, 2003; 978-4-09-186635-6	June 21, 2011; 978-1-4215-3533-3
1. "Trite Prophecies" (陳腐な預言書, Chinpuna Yogen-sho); 2. "A Trite Japanese" (陳腐な日本人, Chinpuna Nihonjin); 3. "The Tattooed Man" (入れ墨の男, Irezumi no Otoko); 4. "The Writhing Truth" (蠢く真実, Ugomeku Shinjitsu); 5. "Bravery in 2001" (2001年の勇気, 2001-nen no Yūki); 6. "Farewell in 2001" (2001年の別れ, 2001-nen no Wakare); 7. "What A Wonderful World" (この素晴らしき世界, Kono Subarashiki Sekai); 8. "The Greatest Show on Earth" (史上最大のショー, Shijō Saidai no Shō); 9. "Gas-Mask Wearing Salesman" (防毒マスクのセールスマン, Bōdoku Masuku no Sērusuman); 10. "Time Limit" (タイム・リミット, Taimu Rimitto); 11. "Long Live the Expo" (ばんぱくばんざい, Ban Paku Banzai); 12. "Before the Rainbow" (虹のこちら側, Niji no Kochiragawa); 13. "Over the Rainbow" (虹のむこう側, Niji no Mukou Soba)
16	Beyond the Looking Glass; Kagami no Mukou (鏡のむこう)	April 30, 2004; 978-4-09-186636-3	August 9, 2011; 978-1-4215-3534-0
1. "The Base of the Rainbow" (虹のつけ根, Niji no Tsukene); 2. "A True Friend" (本当の友達, Hontō no Tomodachi); 3. "In the Mirror" (鏡のむこう, Kagami no Mukou); 4. "The Real Hanging Hill" (本当の首吊り坂, Hontō no Kubitsuri-zaka); 5. "The Real Ghost" (本当の幽霊, Hontō no Yūrei); 6. "Superhuman" (人間以上, Ningen'ijō); 7. "Friend Era" (ともだち暦, Tomodachi-reki); 8. "The Pole Vaulter" (棒高跳びの男, Bōtakatobi no Otoko); 9. "Modern History" (近代史, Kindai-shi); 10. "The Imagination of Children" (子どもの発想, Kodomo no Hassō); 11. "Toy Box" (オモチャ箱, Omocha-bako)
17	Cross-counter; Kurosu Kauntā (クロスカウンター)	October 29, 2004; 978-4-09-186637-0	October 11, 2011; 978-1-4215-3535-7
1. "Earth Defense Force" (地球防衛軍, Chikyū Bōei-gun); 2. "Fight, Katsuo!" (がんばれ！ カツオ, Ganbare! Katsuo); 3. "Much Despair" (多くのゼツボウ, Ōku no Zetsubou); 4. "The Ice Queen" (氷の女王, Kōri no Joō); 5. "Where Despair Began" (絶望の始まり, Zetsubō no Hajimari); 6. "On a Journey" (旅の途中, Tabi no Tochū); 7. "The Weight of the Journey" (旅の重さ, Tabi no Omo-sa); 8. "Officer at the End of the Earth" (最果ての警察官, Saihate no Keisatsukan); 9. "Song at the End of the Earth" (最果ての歌, Saihate no Uta); 10. "Summer Homework" (夏休みの宿題, Natsuyasumi no Shukudai); 11. "Meeting at the Crossroad - Cross-counter" (十字路の遭遇（クロスカウンター）, Jūjiro no Sōgū (Kurosu Kauntā))
18	Everybody's Song; Min'na no Uta (みんなの歌)	February 28, 2005; 978-4-09-186638-7	December 20, 2011; 978-1-4215-3536-4
1. "Guta Lala, Suda Lala" (グータララ スーダララ, Gūtarara Sūdarara); 2. "The-Two Still Alive" (生き残った二人, Ikinokotta Futari); 3. "Daughter" (娘よ……, Musume yo……); 4. "Everyone's Song" (みんなの歌, Min'na no Uta); 5. "Everyone, Gather" (みんな集まって, Min'na Atsumatte); 6. "Stand! Because I'm Standing, Joe!!" (立て、立つんだ、ジョー!!, Tate, Tatsu'nda, Jō!!); 7. "Encore, Encore!!" (アンコールアンコール!!, Ankōru Ankōru!!); 8. "World Change Begins" (世界を変える始まり, Sekai o Kaeru Hajimari); 9. "Things That Must Not Be Seen" (見てはいけないもの, Mite wa Ikenai Mono); 10. "Things That Must Not Be Heard" (聞いてはいけないもの, Kiite wa Ikenai Mono); 11. "Things That Must Not Be Known" (知ってはいけないもの, Shitte wa Ikenai Mono)
19	The man who came back Kaettekita Otoko (帰ってきた男)	June 30, 2005; 978-4-09-186639-4	February 21, 2012; 978-1-4215-3537-1
1. "Final Prey" (最後の獲物, Saigo no Emono); 2. "Something Huge is Coming" (どデカいものがやってくる, Do Deka I-mono ga Yattekuru); 3. "Ichi the Spade" (スペードの市, Supēdo no Ichi); 4. "The Melancholy of Manga Artist Ujiki" (漫画家氏木氏の憂鬱, Mangakka Ujiki-shi no Yūutsu); 5. "The One Who Got Through" (突破者, Toppa-sha); 6. "The Great Escape" (大脱走, Dai Dassō); 7. "The Seven Samurai of the Badlands" (荒野の七人の侍, Kōya no Shichinin'nosamurai); 8. "Gotcha" (見ぃーつけた, Mi'ītsuketa); 9. "Who's Behind You" (後ろの正面, Ushiro no Shōmen); 10. "Ultimate Evil" (最悪の男, Saiaku no Otoko); 11. "The Man Who Came Back" (帰ってきた男, Kaettekita Otoko)
20	Humanity in the Balance; Jinrui no Shōbu (人類の勝負)	October 28, 2005; 978-4-09-186640-0	April 17, 2012; 978-1-4215-3538-8
1. "Final Lesson" (極意, Gokui); 2. "Time of the Holy Mother" (聖母の時間, Seibo no Jikan); 3. "When the Frog Sings" (カエル鳴く時, Kaeru Naku Toki); 4. "Lowest of the Low" (最低の男, Saitei no Otoko); 5. "Humanity in the Balance" (人類の勝負, Jinrui no Shōbu); 6. "Who is the Friend?!" (“ともだち”は誰!?, "Tomodachi" wa Dare!?); 7. "Great Power" (偉大な力, Idaina-ryoku); 8. "I'm Him" (僕こそは, Boku Koso wa); 9. "Which is Which?!" (どっちがどっち!?, Dotchi ga Dotchi!?); 10. "Unscripted Scenario" (シナリオにないシナリオ, Shinario ni Nai Shinario); 11. "Twenty-Four Hours for Humanity" (24時間の人類, 24-jikan no Jinrui)
21	Arrival of the space aliens Uchūbito Genru (宇宙人現る)	February 28, 2006; 978-4-09-180159-3	July 17, 2012; 978-1-4215-3539-5
1. "Who Are You" (あんた誰!?, Anta Dare!?); 2. "Hide and Seek" (かくれんぼ, Kakurenbo); 3. "The Pope's Messenger" (法王の使者, Hōō no Shisha); 4. "Let's Playyy" (あーそびーましょ, A'āsobi'īmasho); 5. "The Aliens Arrive" (宇宙人現る, Uchūbito Genru); 6. "The Friend There and Now" (今そこにいるともだち, Ima Soko ni Iru Tomodachi); 7. "The Sequel to the Book of Prophecy" (つづきのよげんしょ, Tsudzuki no Yogen-sho); 8. "Only That Remains" (あんだけが残る, An Dake ga Nokoru); 9. "Below This Flag" (この旗のもとに, Kono Hata no Moto ni); 10. "Raise That Flag" (その旗をあげろ, Sono Hata o Agero); 11. "Confession of a Mask" (仮面の告白, Kamen no Kokuhaku)
22	The Beginning of Justice; Seigi no Hajimari (正義の始まり)	November 30, 2006; 978-4-09-180805-9	September 18, 2012; 978-1-4215-4277-5
1. "After the Confession" (告白のあと, Kokuhaku no Ato); 2. "The Last Song" (最後の歌, Saigo no Uta); 3. "People of Tokyo" (東京都民の皆さん, Tōkyōto-min no Minasan); 4. "Your Battle" (あんたの勝負, Anta no Shōbu); 5. "You Will Live" (あなたが生きなさい, Anata ga Iki Nasai); 6. "The Masked King" (お面大王, O-men Daiō); 7. "Don't Give the Enemy" (敵に渡すな, Teki ni Watasu na); 8. "The Legendary Detective" (続伝説の刑事, Zoku Densetsu no Deka); 9. "Don't Do Anything" (何もするな, Nani mo Suru na); 10. "The Beginning of Justice" (正義の始まり, Seigi no Hajimari); 11. "Protector of Justice" (正義を守る男, Seigi o Mamoru Otoko); 12. "The End of the Game" (遊びの終わり, Asobi no Owari); 13. "Resolution" (決着, Ketchaku)

== 21st Century Boys ==
No.	Title	Original release date	North American release date
01	The Death of "Friend" "Tomodachi" no Shi (ともだち”の死)	May 30, 2007; 978-4-09-181216-2	January 15, 2013; 978-1-4215-4326-0
1. "Death of the Friend" (“ともだち”の死, "Tomodachi" no Shi); 2. "The Adult in the Dream" (夢の中の大人, Yume no Naka no Otona); 3. "Our Flag" (俺たちの旗, Oretachi no Hata); 4. "Start of Childhood" (子供のはじまり, Kodomo no Hajimari); 5. "Ghost of the Future" (未来のおばけ, Mirai no Obake); 6. "Copy of the Copy" (マネのマネ, Mane no Mane); 7. "Hiding Place" (かくし場所, Kakushi Basho); 8. "You Died Today" (おまえは今日で死にました, Omae wa Kyō de Shinimashita)
02	20th Century Boys; 20 Seiki Shōnen (20世紀少年)	September 28, 2007; 978-4-09-181495-1	March 19, 2013; 978-1-4215-4327-7
1. "Rules of the Game" (ゲームのルール, Gēmu no Rūru); 2. "The Devil's Remnants" (悪魔の残党, Akuma no Zantō); 3. "Goodbye, Manjome" (さよなら万丈目, Sayonara Manjōme); 4. "Button" (スイッチ, Suitchi); 5. "Punch Out" (パンチアウト, Panchi Auto); 6. "I'm Not Letting It End" (絶対に終わらせない, Zettai ni Owarasenai); 7. "I'm Sorry" (ごめんなさい, Gomen'nasai); 8. "20th Century Boy" (20世紀少年, 20 Seiki Shōnen)

== 20th Century Boys: Ujiko Ujio's Mangari Michi ==
No.	Title	Original release date	North American release date
01	20 Seiki Shounen: Ujiko Ujio Sakuhinshuu (20世紀少年 の脇役 ウジコウジオ作品集)	June 6, 2010; 978-4-09-183245-0	N/A
