= List of Higurashi When They Cry chapters =

The English cover of the first volume of the Higurashi: When They Cry manga released by Yen Press on November 18, 2008, in North America

The manga series Higurashi When They Cry comprises 14 separate story arcs written by Ryukishi07 and illustrated by several different manga artists working separately on one or more story arcs primarily based on the Higurashi no Naku Koro ni visual novel series by 07th Expansion. The first manga, an adaptation of Onikakushi-hen, is illustrated by Karin Suzuragi and was serialized in the Square Enix's Gangan Powered between the May 2005 and May 2006 issues. Suzuragi also draws the manga adaptation of Tsumihoroboshi-hen, which was serialized in Gangan Powered between the August 2006 and June 2008 issues, and Matsuribayashi-hen, which started serialization in Gangan Powered in the August 2008 issue. When Gangan Powered was discontinued with the April 2009 issue, Matsuribayashi-hen was transferred to Square Enix's Gangan Joker with the May 2009 inaugural issue, and ran until the May 2011 issue. Suzuragi's also drew the manga adaptation of Saikoroshi-hen, which was serialized between the July and December 2011 issues of Gangan Joker.

Yutori Hōjō illustrated the adaptations of Watanagashi-hen, which was serialized Square Enix's Gangan Wing between the June 2005 and May 2006 issues, and Meakashi-hen, which was serialized in Gangan Wing between the August 2006 and April 2008 issues. Jirō Suzuki illustrates the adaptation of Tatarigoroshi-hen, which was serialized in Square Enix's GFantasy between the June 2005 and June 2006 issues. Yoshiki Tonogai illustrates the adaptation of Himatsubushi-hen, which was serialized in Square Enix's Monthly Shōnen Gangan between the February and November 2006 issues. Hanase Momoyama illustrated the adaptation of Minagoroshi-hen, which was serialized in GFantasy between the July 2008 and July 2010 issues. Rechi Kazuki illustrates the adaptation of Hirukowashi-hen, which was serialized in Square Enix's Gangan Online between March 26 and September 24, 2009. In addition to the main series, there are four side stories related to the main Higurashi story, but with new characters. The first, named Onisarashi-hen (鬼曝し編, Demon Exposing Chapter), is drawn by En Kitō and was serialized in Comp Ace between the May 2005 and November 2006 issues. The next, titled Yoigoshi-hen (宵越し編, Beyond Midnight Chapter), is drawn by Mimori and was serialized in GFantasy between the July 2006 and August 2007 issues. Another manga titled Utsutsukowashi-hen (現壊し編, Reality Breaking Chapter) is also drawn by Kitō and was serialized in Comp Ace between the February and August 2007 issues. The last side-story, Kokoroiyashi-hen (心癒し編, Heart Healing Chapter), is drawn by Yuna Kagesaki and was serialized Kadokawa Shoten's Comp Ace between the October 2008 and April 2009 issues.

The chapters for the question arcs, Onikakushi-hen, Watanagashi-hen, Tatarigoroshi-hen, and Himatsubushi-hen were collected into two bound volumes each between December 2005 and December 2006 in Japan. The first two answer arcs, Meakashi-hen and Tsumihoroboshi-hen, were collected into four volumes each. Onisarashi-hen and Yoigoshi-hen were collected into two volumes each released in Japan between April 2006 and August 2007. Utsutsukowashi-hen was released in a single volume in December 2007 in Japan, and a single volume of Kokoroiyashi-hen was released in March 2009. Hirukowashi-hen was published in a single volume in December 2009. In total, 38 volumes have been released over the entire series. Yen Press licensed the manga series at New York Comic Con 2008 under the title Higurashi When They Cry for release in English in North America. The manga was initially serialized in Yen Press' Yen Plus anthology magazine, the first issue of which went on sale on July 29, 2008. The first English volume of the manga was originally planned to be sold in early 2009, but was released in November 2008.

== Volume list ==
=== Abducted by Demons Arc (Onikakushi-hen) ===
| No. | Original release date | Original ISBN | English release date | English ISBN |
|---|---|---|---|---|
| 1 (1) | December 22, 2005 | 978-4-7-5751-590-1 | November 18, 2008 | 978-0-7595-2983-0 |
1. "Hinamizawa Village" (雛見沢村, "Hinamizawa-mura"); 2. "The Night of the Cotton Drifting" (綿流しの夜, "Watanagashi no Yoru"); 3. "Suspicion" (疑心, "Gishin")
| 2 (2) | June 22, 2006 | 978-4-7575-1704-2 | February 17, 2009 | 978-0-7595-2984-7 |
4. "Trap" (罠, "Wana"); 5. "Isolation" (孤立, "Koritsu"); 6. "Rena Ryugu" (竜宮レナ, "Ryūgū Rena"); 7. "Wish" (願い, "Negai")

=== Cotton Drifting Arc (Watanagashi-hen) ===
| No. | Original release date | Original ISBN | English release date | English ISBN |
|---|---|---|---|---|
| 1 (3) | December 22, 2005 | 978-4-7575-1591-8 | May 31, 2009 | 978-0-7595-2985-4 |
1. "Hinamizawa" (雛見沢); 2. "Angel Mort" (エンジェルモート, "Enjeru Mōto"); 3. "The Hinamizawa Dam Project" (雛見沢ダム計画, "Hinamizawa Damu Keikaku"); 4. "Angel Battle" (エンジェル攻防戦, "Engeru Kōbōsen"); 5. "The Cotton Drifting" (綿流し, "Watanagashi")
| 2 (4) | June 22, 2006 | 978-4-7575-1710-3 | September 2009 | 978-0-7595-2986-1 |
6. "The Saiguden" (祭具殿, "Saiguden"); 7. "The Fifth Year's Curse" (五年目の祟り, "Go-nenme no Tatari"); 8. "Demoned Away" (鬼隠し, "Onikakushi"); 9. "Disappearance" (失踪, "Shissō"); 10. "Phone Call" (電話, "Denwa"); 11. "Demon" (鬼, "Oni"); 12. "The Last Wish" (最後の願い, "Saigo no Negai")

=== Curse Killing Arc (Tatarigoroshi-hen) ===
| No. | Original release date | Original ISBN | English release date | English ISBN |
|---|---|---|---|---|
| 1 (5) | December 22, 2005 | 978-4-7575-1592-5 | November 17, 2009 | 978-0-7595-2987-8 |
1. "Chapter 1" (第1話, "Dai Ichi Wa"); 2. "Chapter 2" (第2話, "Dai Ni Wa"); 3. "Chapter 3" (第3話, "Dai San Wa"); 4. "Chapter 4" (第4話, "Dai Yon Wa"); 5. "Chapter 5" (第5話, "Dai Go Wa")
| 2 (6) | June 22, 2006 | 978-4-7575-1712-7 | February 23, 2010 | 978-0-7595-2988-5 |
6. "Chapter 6" (第6話, "Dai Roku Wa"); 7. "Chapter 7" (第7話, "Dai Shichi Wa"); 8. "Chapter 8" (第8話, "Dai Hachi Wa"); 9. "Chapter 9" (第9話, "Dai Kyū Wa"); 10. "Chapter 10" (第10話, "Dai Jū Wa"); 11. "Chapter 11" (第11話, "Dai Jū-ichi Wa"); 12. "Chapter 12" (第12話, "Dai Jū-ni Wa"); 13. "Final Chapter" (最終話, "Saishū Wa")

=== Time Killing Arc (Himatsubushi-hen) ===
| No. | Original release date | Original ISBN | English release date | English ISBN |
|---|---|---|---|---|
| 1 (7) | August 22, 2006 | 978-4-7575-1741-7 | June 15, 2010 | 978-0-316-08611-0 |
1. "Counsel" (勧告, "Kankoku"); 2. "Knight of the Mahjong Table" (雀卓の騎士, "Jantaku no Kishi"); 3. "Resolve" (覚悟, "Kakugo"); 4. "Warning" (警告, "Keikoku")
| 2 (8) | December 22, 2006 | 978-4-7575-1825-4 | August 17, 2010 | 978-0-316-09766-6 |
5. "Contact" (接触, "Sesshoku"); 6. "Liberty" (解放, "Kaihō"); 7. "Fate" (運命, "Sadame"); 8. "Parting" (別れ, "Wakare"); 9. "Determination" (決意, "Ketsui")

=== Beyond Midnight Arc (Yoigoshi-hen) ===
| No. | Original release date | Original ISBN | English release date | English ISBN |
|---|---|---|---|---|
| 1 (9) | January 27, 2007 | 978-4-7575-1931-2 | October 26, 2010 | 978-0-316-10240-7 |
1. "Chapter 0" (第0話, "Dai 0 Wa"); 2. "June 21, 9:00 PM" (6月21日午後9時, "Rokugatsu Ni-jū-ichi-nichi Gogo Ku-ji"); 3. "June 21, 10:00 PM" (6月21日午後10時, "Rokugatsu Ni-jū-ichi-nichi Gogo Jū-ji"); 4. "June 21, 11:00 PM, Assembly Hall 1" (6月21日午後11時 集会所①, "Rokugatsu Ni-jū-ichi-nichi Jū-ichi-ji Shūkaijo Ichi"); 5. "June 22, 0:00 AM, Assembly Hall 2" (6月22日午前0時 集会所②, "Rokugatsu Ni-jū-ni-nichi Gozen Zero-ji Shūkaijo Ni"); 6. "June 22, 0:30 AM, Furude Shrine 1" (6月22日午前0時30分 古手神社①, "Rokugatsu Ni-jū-ni-nichi Gozen Zero-ji San-jūppun Furude Jinja Ichi"); 7. "June 22, 1:00 AM, Furude Shrine 2" (6月22日午前1時 古手神社②, "Rokugatsu Ni-jū-ni-nichi Gozen Ichi-ji Furude Jinja Ni")
| 2 (10) | August 27, 2007 | 978-4-7575-2094-3 | December 21, 2010 | 978-0-316-12375-4 |
7. "June 22, 2:00 AM, Assembly Hall 3" (6月22日午前2時 集会所③, "Rokugatsu Ni-jū-ni-nichi Gozen Ni-ji Shūkaijo San"); 8. "June 22, 3:00 AM, Assembly Hall 4" (6月22日午前3時 集会所④, "Rokugatsu Ni-jū-ni-nichi Gozen San-ji Shūkaijo Yo"); 9. "June 22, 4:00 AM, Assembly Hall 5" (6月22日午前4時 集会所⑤, "Rokugatsu Ni-jū-ni-nichi Gozen Yo-ji Shūkaijo Go"); 10. "June 22, Dawn" (6月22日 夜明け, "Rokugatsu Ni-jū-ni-nichi Yoake"); 11. "June 22, 5:00 AM, To the Sonozaki Estate" (6月22日午前5時 園崎本家へ, "Rokugatsu Ni-jū-ni-nichi Gozen Go-ji Sonozaki Honke e"); 12. "June 22, Daybreak, Sonozaki Estate" (6月22日早暁 園崎本家, "Rokugatsu Ni-jū-ni-nichi Sōgyō Sonozaki Honke"); 13. "June 22, 6:00 AM, Conclusion" (6月22日午前6時 決着, "Rokugatsu Ni-jū-ni-nichi Gozen Roku-ji Ketchaku")

=== Eye Opening Arc (Meakashi-hen) ===
| No. | Original release date | Original ISBN | English release date | English ISBN |
|---|---|---|---|---|
| 1 (11) | January 27, 2007 | 978-4-7575-1928-2 | February 22, 2011 | 978-0-316-12376-1 |
1. "Homecoming" (帰郷, "Kikyō"); 2. "Reunion" (再会, "Saikai"); 3. "Oyashiro-sama" (オヤシロさま); 4. "Unforgivable..." (ユルサナイ…, "Yurusanai..."); 5. "The Cotton Drifting" (ワタ流し, "Watanagashi")
| 2 (12) | July 27, 2007 | 978-4-7575-2059-2 | April 26, 2011 | 978-0-316-12378-5 |
6. "Underground Saiguden" (地下祭具殿, "Chika Saiguden"); 7. "Restitution" (けじめ, "Kejime"); 8. "Fate" (宿命, "Shukumei"); 9. "Footstep" (足音, "Ashioto"); 10. "The 1983 Cotton Drifting" (昭和58年綿流し, "Shōwa 58-nen Watanagashi"); 11. "Resolve" (決意, "Ketsui")
| 3 (13) | December 22, 2007 | 978-4-7575-2189-6 | June 28, 2011 | 978-0-316-12379-2 |
12. "Retrospect" (回顧, "Kaiko"); 13. "Revenge" (仇, "Kataki"); 14. "Blind Followers" (妄信者, "Bōshinsha"); 15. "Live" (生きて, "Ikite"); 16. "The Priestess of Oyashiro-sama" (オヤシロさまの巫女, "Oyashiro-sama no Miko")
| 4 (14) | June 21, 2008 | 978-4-7575-2308-1 | August 16, 2011 | 978-0-316-12383-9 |
17. "Roar of the Demon" (鬼の咆哮, "Oni no Hōkō"); 18. "Mion and Shion" (魅音と詩音, "Mion to Shion"); 19. "Promise" (約束, "Yakusoku"); 20. "Confession" (告白, "Kokuhaku"); 21. "Happy Notebook" (幸せノート, "Shiawase Nōto")

=== Atonement Arc (Tsumihoroboshi-hen) ===
| No. | Original release date | Original ISBN | English release date | English ISBN |
|---|---|---|---|---|
| 1 (15) | December 22, 2006 | 978-4-7575-1826-1 | October 25, 2011 | 978-0-316-12384-6 |
1. "Happy Rena" (シアワセなレナ, "Shiawase na Rena"); 2. "Twisting World" (歪む世界, "Hizumu Sekai"); 3. "Rena's Fight" (レナの戦い, "Rena no Tatakai")
| 2 (16) | June 22, 2007 | 978-4-7575-2027-1 | December 13, 2011 | 978-0-316-12385-3 |
4. "The Ends of Resolve" (決意の果て, "Ketsui no Hate"); 5. "Friends" (仲間, "Nakama"); 6. "And the Cotton Drifting" (そして綿流し, "Soshite Watanagashi"); 7. "The Truth of the Curse" (祟りのシンジツ, "Tatari no Shinjitsu")
| 3 (17) | December 22, 2007 | 978-4-7575-2178-0 | February 28, 2012 | 978-0-316-12387-7 |
8. "Turnaround" (反転, "Hanten"); 9. "Stupefaction" (昏迷, "Konmei"); 10. "Secrets" (秘密, "Himitsu"); 11. "Memories" (記憶, "Kioku")
| 4 (18) | June 21, 2008 | 978-4-7575-2307-4 | April 24, 2012 | 978-0-316-12388-4 |
12. "The Last Move" (最後の一手, "Saigo no Itte"); 13. "Siege" (籠城, "Rōjō"); 14. "Time Limit" (タイムリミット, "Taimu Rimitto"); 15. "Less Than 10 Minutes" (もう10分も無い, "Mō Juppun mo Nai"); 16. "Happy Rena" (幸せなレナ, "Shiawase na Rena")

=== Massacre Arc (Minagoroshi-hen) ===
| No. | Original release date | Original ISBN | English release date | English ISBN |
|---|---|---|---|---|
| 1 (19) | December 22, 2008 | 978-4-7575-2450-7 | September 25, 2012 | 978-0-316-22541-0 |
1. "Frederica" (フレデリカ, "Furederika"); 2. "In the Mountains" (山中にて, "Sanchū nite"); 3. "The Power to Change Destiny" (運命を変える力, "Unmei o Kaeru Chikara"); 4. "A World of Good Fortune" (幸運な世界, "Kōun na Sekai"); 5. "Miraculous Reunion" (奇跡の再会, "Kiseki no Saikai")
| 2 (19) | June 22, 2009 | 978-4-7575-2588-7 | September 25, 2012 | 978-0-316-22541-0 |
6. "The Forgotten Man" (忘れていた男, "Wasureteita Otoko"); 7. "A World I've Seen Before" (いつか見た世界, "Itsuka Mita Sekai"); 8. "Keiichi's Idea" (圭一のアイデア, "Keiichi no Aidea"); 9. "Hinamizawa Spirit" (雛見沢スピリッツ, "Hinamizawa Supirittsu")
| 3 (20) | August 27, 2009 | 978-4-7575-2662-4 | December 11, 2012 | 978-0-316-22910-4 |
10. "Saving Hands" (救いの手, "Sukui no Te"); 11. "The Third Appeal" (3度目の陳情, "Sandome no Chinjō"); 12. "Oyashiro-sama's Curse" (オヤシロさまの祟り, "Oyashiro-sama no Tatari"); 13. "The Spirit of the Defense Alliance" (死守同盟の魂, "Shishu Dōmei no Tamashii")
| 4 (20) | December 22, 2009 | 978-4-7575-2762-1 | December 11, 2012 | 978-0-316-22910-4 |
14. "Showdown with Oryou" (お魎との対決, "Oryō to no Taiketsu"); 15. "Oryou's Power" (お魎の力, "Oryō no Chikara"); 16. "True Strength" (ほんとうの強さ, "Hontō no Tsuyosa"); 17. "On the Night of the Cotton Drifting" (綿流しの夜に, "Watanagashi no Yoru ni")
| 5 (21) | April 22, 2010 | 978-4-7575-2853-6 | March 26, 2013 | 978-0-316-22944-9 |
18. "Commence Operations" (作戦開始, "Sakusen Kaishi"); 19. "Lingering Attachment to This World" (この世界への未練, "Kono Sekai e no Miren"); 20. "Unforeseen Developments" (予期せぬ展開, "Yokisenu Tenkai"); 21. "Hinamizawa Syndrome" (雛見沢症候群, "Hinamizawa Shōkōgun")
| 6 (21) | August 21, 2010 | 978-4-7575-2971-7 | March 26, 2013 | 978-0-316-22944-9 |
22. "The Beginning of the End" (終わりの始まり, "Owari no Hajimari"); 23. "Stopped Time" (止まった時間, "Tomatta Jikan"); 24. "Demise" (終焉, "Shūen"); 25. "Apocalypse" (終末作戦, "Shūmatsu Sakusen")

=== Festival Accompanying Arc (Matsuribayashi-hen) ===
| No. | Original release date | Original ISBN | English release date | English ISBN |
|---|---|---|---|---|
| 1 (22) | December 22, 2008 | 978-4-7575-2446-0 | June 25, 2013 | 978-0-316-22945-6 |
1. "Miyoko Tanashi" (田無美代子, "Tanashi Miyoko"); 2. "Escape" (脱走, "Dassō"); 3. "Thunder" (雷鳴, "Raimei"); 4. "Bond" (絆, "Kizuna")
| 2 (22) | June 22, 2009 | 978-4-7575-2587-0 | June 25, 2013 | 978-0-316-22945-6 |
5. "Don't Step On It!" (踏まないで, "Fumanaide"); 6. "The Marco Polo Bridge Incident" (盧溝橋事件, "Rokōkyō Jiken"); 7. "Kyosuke Irie" (入江京介, "Irie Kyōsuke"); 8. "The Curse" (祟り, "Tatari"); 9. "The Second Sacrificial Victim" (生贄第二号, "Ikenie Dainigō")
| 3 (23) | December 22, 2009 | 978-4-7575-2751-5 | October 29, 2013 | 978-0-316-22946-3 |
10. "The Priestess of Oyashiro-sama" (オヤシロさまの巫女, "Oyashiro-sama no Miko"); 11. "The Accident at Shirakawa Park" (白川公園転落事故, "Shirakawa Kōen Tenraku Jiko"); 12. "The Queen's Mother" (女王の母, "Joō no Haha"); 13. "The Murder of the Hojo's Aunt" (北条叔母撲殺事件, "Hōjō-oba Bokusatsu Jiken")
| 4 (23) | August 21, 2010 | 978-4-7575-2972-4 | October 29, 2013 | 978-0-316-22946-3 |
14. "A New Wind" (新しい風, "Atarashii Kaze"); 15. "Ones on the Dice" (サイコロの1, "Saikoro no Ichi"); 16. "Invitation to the End" (終末への誘い, "Shūmatsu e no Izanai"); 17. "Declaration of War" (宣戦布告, "Sensen Fukoku"); 18. "Hanyu Furude" (古手羽入, "Furude Hanyū")
| 5 (24) | August 21, 2010 | 978-4-7575-2973-1 | January 21, 2014 | 978-0-316-22948-7 |
19. "Hope and Schemes" (希望と陰謀, "Kibō to Inbō"); 20. "The Strength of All" (皆の力, "Minna no Chikara"); 21. "Reunion" (再会, "Saikai"); 22. "Kuraudo Ooishi" (大石蔵人, "Ōishi Kuraudo"); 23. "Operation 48 Hours" (48時間作戦, "48 Jikan Sakusen"); 24. "Eve of the Final Battle" (決戦前夜, "Kessen Zenya")
| 6 (24) | December 22, 2010 | 978-4-7575-3098-0 | January 21, 2014 | 978-0-316-22948-7 |
25. "The Battle Begins" (開戦, "Kaisen"); 26. "Escape" (脱出, "Dasshutsu"); 27. "Battle at the Sonozaki Estate" (園崎家攻防戦, "Sonozaki-ke Kōbōsen"); 28. "I'm Here to Help You" (君を助けに来た, "Kimi o Tasuke ni Kita")
| 7 (25) | April 22, 2011 | 978-4-7575-3204-5 | April 22, 2014 | 978-0-316-22949-4 |
29. "Miyo and Miyoko" (三四と美代子, "Miyo to Miyoko"); 30. "Battle on the Back Mountain" (裏山の激闘, "Urayama no Gekitō"); 31. "Forcible Entry" (強行潜入, "Kyōkō Sennyū"); 32. "Breaking the Barrier" (封鎖線突破, "Fūsasen Toppa")
| 8 (25) | August 22, 2011 | 978-4-7575-3335-6 | April 22, 2014 | 978-0-316-22949-4 |
33. "Showdown, And Then…" (決着、そして…。, "Ketchaku, Soshite…."); 34. "Gods and Men" (神と人と, "Kami to Hito to"); 35. "An Ideal World" (理想の世界, "Risō no Sekai")

=== Dice Killing Arc (Saikoroshi-hen) ===
| No. | Original release date | Original ISBN | English release date | English ISBN |
|---|---|---|---|---|
| 1 (26) | December 22, 2011 | 978-4-7575-3451-3 | November 18, 2014 | 978-0-316-33649-9 |
1. "The Worst World" (最悪の世界, "Saiaku no Sekai"); 2. "The God's Dice's Eye" (神のサイコロの目, "Kami no Saikoro no Me"); 3. "Lonely" (ひとりぼっち, "Hitoribocchi"); 4. "Bernkastel" (ベルンカステル, "Berunkasuteru"); 5. "Mother and Daughter" (母と子と, "Haha to Ko to"); 6. "One World" (一つの世界, "Hitotsu no Sekai")

=== Demon Exposing Arc (Onisarashi-hen) ===
| No. | Original release date | Original ISBN | English release date | English ISBN |
|---|---|---|---|---|
| 1 | April 10, 2006 | 978-4-0471-3815-5 | May 31, 2011 | 978-0-316-07334-9 |
Prologue: 1. "Beginning" (はじまり, "Hajimari"); 2. "Premonition" (予感, "Yokan"); 3. "Family" (家族, "Kazoku")
| 2 | September 26, 2006 | 978-4-0471-3862-9 | May 31, 2011 | 978-0-316-07334-9 |
4. "Crumbling" (崩壊, "Hōkai"); 5. "Secret" (秘密, "Himitsu"); 6. "Settlement" (決着, "Ketchaku"); 7. "Truth" (真実, "Shinjitsu")

=== Currently Destroyed Arc (Utsutsukowashi-hen) ===
| No. | Release date | ISBN |
|---|---|---|
| 1 | December 26, 2007 | 978-4-0471-3996-1 |
1. "Sympathy" (共鳴, "Kyōmei"); 2. "Misunderstanding" (誤解, "Gokai"); 3. "Companion" (同士, "Dōshi")

=== Healing Heart Arc (Kokoroiyashi-hen) ===
| No. | Release date | ISBN |
|---|---|---|
| 1 | March 26, 2009 | 978-4-0471-5215-1 |
1. "Special Summer Vacation" (特別な夏休み, "Tokubetsu na Natsuyasumi"); 2. "Trip Planning" (旅行計画, "Ryokō Keikaku"); 3. "Operation Going Ahead!!" (作戦決行!!, "Sakusen Kekkō!!"); 4. "Happening!?" (ハプニング!?, "Hapuningu!?"); 5. "Always Together……" (ずっと一緒に……, "Zutto Issho ni……"); 6. "Determination" (決意, "Ketsui"); 7. "Someday……" (いつか……, "Itsuka……")

=== Daytime Breakdown Arc (Hirukowashi-hen) ===
| No. | Release date | ISBN |
|---|---|---|
| 1 | December 22, 2009 | 978-4-7575-2746-1 |
1. "Sudden Change" (豹変, "Hyōhen"); 2. "Key Person as Expected" (やっぱりキーパーソン, "Yappari Kīpāson"); 3. "Yet for Rena, Only Mr. Tomitake is Here" (もうレナには富竹さんしかいないの, "Mō Rena ni wa Tomitake-san Shika Inai no"); 4. "Activate!! Endemic Spiritual Barrier" (発動!! 固有結界, "Hatsudō!! Koyū Kekkai"); 5. "That Moment Keiichi is Electrified——!" (その時圭一に電流走る——!, "Sono Toki Keiichi ni Denryū Hashiru——!"); 6. "Rena's Smiling Face" (レナの笑顔, "Rena no Egao"); 7. "Wonderful Treasure" (素敵な宝物, "Suteki na Takaramono")

=== Gou ===
| No. | Original release date | Original ISBN | English release date | English ISBN |
|---|---|---|---|---|
| 1 (1) | November 4, 2020 | 978-4-0410-9899-8 | June 20, 2023 | 978-1-9753-6379-6 |
1. "Demon-Deceiving Chapter, Part 1" (鬼騙し編 其の壱, "Onidamashi-hen Sono Ichi"); 2. "Demon-Deceiving Chapter, Part 2" (鬼騙し編 其の弐, "Onidamashi-hen Sono Ni"); 3. "Demon-Deceiving Chapter, Part 3" (鬼騙し編 其の参, "Onidamashi-hen Sono San")
| 2 (1) | February 4, 2021 | 978-4-0410-9921-6 | June 20, 2023 | 978-1-9753-6379-6 |
4. "Cotton-Deceiving Chapter, Part 1" (綿騙し編 其の壱, "Watadamashi-hen Sono Ichi"); 5. "Cotton-Deceiving Chapter, Part 2" (綿騙し編 其の弐, "Watadamashi-hen Sono Ni"); 6. "Cotton-Deceiving Chapter, Part 3" (綿騙し編 其の参, "Watadamashi-hen Sono San"); 7. "Cotton-Deceiving Chapter, Part 4" (綿騙し編 其の四, "Watadamashi-hen Sono Yon")
| 3 (2) | July 2, 2021 | 978-4-0411-1463-6 | October 24, 2023 | 978-1-9753-6381-9 |
8. "Curse-Deceiving Chapter, Part 1" (祟騙し編 其の壱, "Tataridamashi-hen Sono Ichi"); 9. "Curse-Deceiving Chapter, Part 2" (祟騙し編 其の弐, "Tataridamashi-hen Sono Ni"); 10. "Curse-Deceiving Chapter, Part 3" (祟騙し編 其の参, "Tataridamashi-hen Sono San"); 11. "Curse-Deceiving Chapter, Part 4" (祟騙し編 其の四, "Tataridamashi-hen Sono Yon")
| 4 (2) | November 2, 2021 | 978-4-0411-1464-3 | October 24, 2023 | 978-1-9753-6381-9 |
12. "Curse-Deceiving Chapter, Part 5" (祟騙し編 其の伍, "Tataridamashi-hen Sono Go"); 13. "Cat-Deceiving Chapter, Part 1" (猫騙し編 其の壱, "Nekodamashi-hen Sono Ichi"); 14. "Cat-Deceiving Chapter, Part 2" (猫騙し編 其の弐, "Nekodamashi-hen Sono Ni"); 15. "Cat-Deceiving Chapter, Part 3" (猫騙し編 其の参, "Nekodamashi-hen Sono San")

=== Meguri ===
| No. | Original release date | Original ISBN | English release date | English ISBN |
|---|---|---|---|---|
| 1 | April 4, 2022 | 978-4-0411-2271-6 | January 23, 2024 | 978-1-9753-6386-4 |
1. "Village-Destroying Chapter Part 1" (郷壊し編 其の壱, "Satokowashi-hen Sono Ichi"); 2. "Village-Destroying Chapter Part 2" (郷壊し編 其の弐, "Satokowashi-hen Sono Ni"); 3. "Village-Destroying Chapter Part 3" (郷壊し編 其の参, "Satokowashi-hen Sono San"); 4. "Village-Destroying Chapter Part 4" (郷壊し編 其の四, "Satokowashi-hen Sono Yon")
| 2 | October 4, 2022 | 978-4-0411-2711-7 | May 21, 2024 | 978-1-9753-7101-2 |
5. "Village-Destroying Chapter Part 5" (郷壊し編 其の五, "Satokowashi-hen Sono Go"); 6. "Demon-Revealing Chapter Part 1" (鬼明し編 其の壱, "Oniakashi-hen Sono Ichi"); 7. "Demon-Revealing Chapter Part 2" (鬼明し編 其の弐, "Oniakashi-hen Sono Ni"); 8. "Demon-Revealing Chapter Part 3" (鬼明し編 其の参, "Oniakashi-hen Sono San")
| 3 | March 3, 2023 | 978-4-0411-3360-6 | August 27, 2024 | 978-1-9753-9021-1 |
9. "Cotton-Revealing Chapter Part 1" (綿明し編 其の壱, Wataakashi-hen Sonoichi); 10. "Cotton-Revealing Chapter Part 2" (綿明し編 其の弐, Wataakashi-hen Sononi); 11. "Cotton-Revealing Chapter Part 3" (綿明し編 其の参, Wataakashi-hen Sonosan); 12. "Curse-Revealing Chapter Part 1" (祟明し編 其の壱, Tatariakashi-hen Sonoichi)
| 4 | September 4, 2023 | 978-4-0411-4035-2 | March 25, 2025 | 979-8-8554-0166-0 |
13. "Curse-Revealing Chapter Part 2" (祟明し編 其の弐, Tatariakashi-hen Sononi); 14. "Cat-Revealing Chapter" (猫明し編, Nekoakashi-hen); 15. "Light-Inhabiting Chapter Part 1" (明暮し編 其の壱, Akarigurashi-hen Sono Ichi); 16. "Light-Inhabiting Chapter Part 2" (明暮し編 其の弐, Akarigurashi-hen Sono Ni)
| 5 | March 4, 2024 | 978-4-0411-4794-8 | July 22, 2025 | 979-8-8554-0882-9 |
17. "Light-Inhabiting Chapter Part 3" (明暮し編 其の参, Akarigurashi-hen sono San); 18. "Light-Inhabiting Chapter Part 4" (明暮し編 其の四, Akarigurashi-hen Sono Yon); 19. "Light-Inhabiting Chapter Part 5" (明暮し編 其の伍, Akarigurashi-hen Sono Go)
