= Confidential Confessions =

Japanese manga series

- Cover of Confidential Confessions volume 1 as published by Kodansha

問題提起作品集 (Mondaiteiki Sakuhinshū)
- Genre: Drama
- Manga
- Written by: Reiko Momochi
- Published by: Kodansha
- English publisher: NA: Tokyopop
- Magazine: Dessert
- Original run: 2000 – 2002
- Volumes: 6
- Manga

Confidential Confessions: Deai
- Written by: Reiko Momochi
- Published by: Kodansha
- English publisher: NA: Tokyopop
- Magazine: Dessert
- Original run: July 11, 2003 – November 22, 2003
- Volumes: 2

Confidential Confessions (Japanese: 問題提起 作品集, Hepburn: Mondaiteiki Sakuhinshū) is a Japanese manga series written and illustrated by Reiko Momochi. The individual volumes of the series were originally published by Kodansha in Japan as Memai (Dizzy), Namida (Tears), and Tobira (The Door). The three were published in 2000, 2001, and 2002, respectively. The series was published in English under the title Confidential Confessions in North America by Tokyopop; the Tokyopop version of the manga is out of print as of August 31, 2009.

The series contains a collection of plots and characters about the hard-hitting issues that real-life teenagers faced during the manga's publication. Each volume tackles such topics as teen prostitution, rape, HIV, stalkers, suicide, and sexual harassment. There are six volumes in the series.

A sequel, Confidential Confessions: Deai (きずな, Kizuna; lit. "Bond"), was released around May 2006. It detailed the situation of Rika, a young teen in need of a job, and her group Peace when they become involved in the deai-kei industry.

== Plot ==
In "The Door", a high school girl named Manatsu feels that her life is boring and meaningless. Her father left, and her mother seemed to care more about school and studying than Manatsu's feelings and needs.

While at school, Manatsu meets a bullied girl nicknamed Asparagus who cuts to relieve her pain. With Asparagus, Manatsu develops a friendship and they begin to create a suicide pact. Manatsu enjoys her time with Asparagus and begins to feel alive again, as well as taking an interest in death and the fragility of life. They raise money and order cyanide pills off the internet, but Manatsu starts to feel uncertain about dying.

After confronting Asparagus on a rooftop, planning to take the pills, Manatsu accidentally falls and grabs onto a ledge. She begs Asparagus to save her, realizing she does not want to die, but instead Asparagus decides that she will jump. The girls are saved at the last moment by civilians, and Manatsu rekindles her relationship with her mother and begins to see life differently. She later learns that Asparagus committed suicide. At her funeral, the bullies refuse to acknowledge their fault. Manatsu concludes that suicide is not brave or wondrous and realizes the pain it leaves on those alive.

== Reception ==
Confidential Confessions received mixed reviews from Western audiences. Manga Life's Miguel Douglas praised the first volume for its "absolute realistic depictions" of the characters and commended it for "tackl[ing] such serious issues" that are "relevant" "throughout the world." Writing for Comics Worth Reading, Johanna Carlson and noted that "it's likely that many readers will pick it up because of the shocking content" but that "treatment doesn't appeal simply to prurient interest". In Carlson's review of volume 4 of Confidential Confessions, she writes that "it's billed as an honest exploration of "the harsh realities of today's youth", but for me, it's more like an old Cecil B. DeMille epic – 80 minutes of glorified sinning, and 10 minutes of redemption to make it the audience feel virtuous instead of embarrassed for watching."

When it comes to drawing style, Reiko Momochi dispenses with the "characteristic arsenal of conventionalized pictorial signs that, along with the "plate-sized" eyes, are a hallmark of Japanese girl comics", says Bernd Dolle-Weinkauff. Because there seems to be "no place in the Confidential Confessions" for "asterisks, little hearts and other symbols of a cute and romantic character". With regard to the topics treated, "excessively narrow connotations of this type of sign with enthusiastic girl fantasies and their partly comical function ... would have to appear out of place". At points in the storyline where the girls feel uncomfortable, hearts are put behind their statements in the German edition of 2019: "But he's direct [heart]" ("Der ist aber direkt [Herz]"). In the fourth volume, young girls are presented who, without further consideration, form a group in order to get money from pedophile men for the panties they have worn, meetings, etc. to obtain. At the beginning of the action, a man takes pictures under the skirts of the girls, who are laughing at this act.

Confidential Confessions: Deai received mixed reception from critics as well. Connie Zhang of Mania graded the first volume with a B, criticizing that the story did not "connect to the reader on a fundamental level" and that there is "no emotional bond to the characters." However, Zhang praised the story concept, noting that it was "interesting" with "an unusual premise". In her review of the second volume, Zhang graded Confidential Confessions: Deai with a B−, with complaints that "everything that worked well in the first volume – the good pacing, the sweetness of Rika and Kiichi's relationship, the heroine's business savvy personality and the sense of risk on every date – [had] been thoughtlessly discarded for the illusion of a thriller." The art, Zhang noted, "managed to stay relatively consistent throughout" and was "pleasant to look at", but there wasn't anything "remarkable about it."

=== Sales ===
Volume 5 of Confidential Confessions placed as number 84 on ICv2's 'Top 100 Graphic Novels' list, which indexes estimated sales from the Diamond comic distributor to comic stores, for September 2004. Volume 1 of Confidential Confessions: Deai reached 77 on the 'Top 100 Graphic Novels' for April 2006.

== Volumes ==
- Volume 1: released July 8, 2003 (208 pages)
- Volume 2: released September 9, 2003 (208 pages)
- Volume 3: released November 4, 2003 (216 pages)
- Volume 4: released April 6, 2004 (232 pages)
- Volume 5: released September 14, 2004 (224 pages)
- Volume 6: released February 8, 2005 (224 pages)
