= Ikigami (film) =

- Theatrical release poster
- Directed by: Tomoyuki Takimoto
- Written by: Motoro Mase; Akimitsu Sasaki; Tomoyuki Takimoto; Hiroyuki Yatsu
- Based on: Ikigami: The Ultimate Limit by Motoro Mase
- Produced by: Akimitsu Sasaki
- Starring: Shota Matsuda; Takashi Tsukamoto; Riko Narumi; Takayuki Yamada; Akira Emoto
- Cinematography: Takahide Shibanushi
- Edited by: Nobuyuki Takahashi
- Music by: Hibiki Inamoto
- Distributed by: Toho Company
- Release date: September 27, 2008 (Japan)
- Running time: 133 minutes
- Country: Japan
- Language: Japanese

Ikigami (Japanese: イキガミ) is a 2008 Japanese film based on Ikigami: The Ultimate Limit, a manga written by Motoro Mase.

== Plot ==
Ikigami takes place in a dystopian society where the government has implemented the "Prosperity Law". This law dictates 1 in 1000 random citizens ages 18~24 will die for the state in a mandatory lottery. Death occurs at a preset date and time, which is when an injected nano-capsule, received at an early age, explodes. The law is meant to create appreciation for life by instilling fear in order make people live the best possible lives.

Once it is decided you will die, you receive your “Ikigami” or “Death Letter” 24 hours in advance. The Death Letter entitles the chosen to free transportation, lodging, and food for their last day alive. The law entitles the family of the chosen to be financially compensated for the death of their family member; though, this compensation can be forfeit if the chosen one has committed a crime. The movie follows the story of three lottery winners as seen through the eyes of a “Prosperity Law” letter handler: a rising musician, the brother of a blind woman, and a politician's suicidal son. Each has their own way of dealing with their fate. These cases are all accompanied by the choices the letter handler has to make.

== Cast ==
- Shota Matsuda as Kengo Fujimoto
- Takashi Tsukamoto as Hidekazu Morio
- Riko Narumi as Sakura Iizuka
- Takayuki Yamada as Satoshi Iizuka
- Akira Emoto as Counselor
