= Over Rev! =

Japanese manga series

- Cover of the first manga volume

オーバーレブ! (Ōbā Rebu)
- Manga
- Written by: Katsumi Yamaguchi
- Published by: Shogakukan
- Magazine: Weekly Young Sunday
- Original run: 1996 – 2004
- Volumes: 31
- Manga

Cross Over Rev!
- Written by: Katsumi Yamaguchi
- Published by: Akita Shoten
- Magazine: Manga Cross
- Original run: March 14, 2019 – present
- Live-action film
- Directed by: Atsushi Muroga
- Produced by: Shirohi Ryū Yū / Kurosu Isao
- Music by: Umaro Yasukawa
- Released: April 26, 2001 (rental release)
- Runtime: 81 minutes

Over Rev! (Japanese: オーバーレブ!, Hepburn: Ōbā Rebu!) is a Japanese manga series created by Katsumi Yamaguchi and Team39. The manga began serialization in the now-defunct seinen manga magazine Weekly Young Sunday in November 1996, and compiled into 31 volumes released between May 1997 and November 2004. The series also spanned into a live action film (V-Cinema) and a CD drama. There were plans for an anime and OVA, but there were no further reports about production. The story revolves around Ryoko Shino, a Japanese high school senior and a former track star who gets into street racing after breaking her Achilles tendon. The tagline for the series is "A Legend of Ultimate Hot Rodder".

== Summary ==
A high school girl and former track runner, Ryoko Shino is out one night with her friends and sees a Nissan Skyline GT-R R32 and Nissan Silvia S13 drifting in tandem just feet in front of her. Instead of being terrified, she can't help but be captivated by the scene. She notices that the Silvia S13's driver is a woman. Ryoko borrows a car magazine from her friend, Toru Takeuchi, and sees there's an article on the Silvia S13 and its driver that she previously saw.

Toru then takes Ryoko for a drive since he recently got his license and takes her to see a drifting practice session at the docks. There Ryoko sees the Silvia S13 and finds out that the driver of the Skyline R32 was Toru's older brother, Takao Takeuchi. Ryoko meets the female driver, who introduces herself as Sawako Morita, and Ryoko tells Sawako she saw her drifting on the mountain that one night. Sawako tells Ryoko that she learned to drift very quickly and that Ryoko could also learn, so she offers to teach Ryoko in her Silvia.

The next day after school, Ryoko goes car shopping with Toru. She tries to look for a good sports car, but they are too expensive for her. Toru mentions that she may find a car at a junkyard for cheap. She wanders around looking for a scrapped car and finds an old man named Akaoka in a junkyard. She tells him that she really wants a sports car and he sells her a blue mica supercharged Toyota MR2 (AW11) for fairly cheap.

While practicing driving and getting her license, Ryoko later meets other skilled female drivers and continues to learn more about driving. Not only does she participate in street racing, but also circuit racing while learning mechanics, independence, and other life lessons.

== Characters ==
=== Main characters ===
- Ryoko Shino (志濃 涼子, Shino Ryōko)
- Car: Toyota MR2 G-Limited (AW11)
- Color: Blue Mica
- Voiced by: Yukiko Mannaka (CD Drama)
Ryoko Shino is the main character of the story. The manga starts off with her as a high school senior who grows to love racing because of her competitive spirit she has from being a track runner. She drives a dark blue mica supercharged Toyota MR2. She has a cheerful and innocent personality. She is very devoted to becoming a street racer to the point where she moves out of her parents' house and starts living on her own. She learns about cars and racing very quickly and naturally with the aid of Boss Akaoka and her friends.
- Sawako Morita (森田 佐和子, Morita Sawako)
- Car: Nissan Silvia K's (S13), later drives a Nissan Silvia K's Aero (S14, Kouki) and a Nissan Silvia Spec R (S15, Axrobat Demo car)
- Color: Pearl White (S14), Lightning Yellow (S15)
- Voiced by: Michiko Neya (CD Drama)
At the beginning of the manga, Sawako has only been driving for two months since she got her license. She is an extraordinary driver and drifter who can push the Silvia to the limit. She drives a Nissan Silvia S13 at the beginning of the manga and shortly after drives a white Silvia S14. She has a very carefree and outspoken attitude, and emotional, which is shown through her driving. She is also depicted as quite promiscuous, but is in love with Toru's older brother, Takao. In order to make ends meet, she works at a lingerie bar, where her stage name is Silvia.
- Aika Katayama (片山 愛香, Katayama Aika)
- Car: Honda CR-X, later switches to a Honda Civic SiR hatchback (EG6) and another Civic SiR hatch with normal roof spec
- Color: Milano Red (EG6), Shocking Pink (EG6 Normal Roof)
- Voiced by: Kumiko Nishihara (CD Drama)
Aika was first introduced when Ryoko was taking her driving test, telling Ryōko she doesn't deserve to have a driver's license. She gets off to a rocky start with Ryoko and Sawako when they first meet, but gradually she becomes friends with them. Being a veteran street racer, she is a very skilled and versatile driver not only in her own car, but in many different types of vehicles (such as driving a large truck, Ryoko's AW11, a Honda CRX, and riding a motorcycle). She seems to be a very solitary person and is portrayed as a tomboy. Aika works as a truck driver as her daily job. She was mistaken to be the "Speed of Sound Beautiful Girl" because of her exceptional driving skills.
- Sari Tachibana (橘 沙璃, Tachibana Sari)
- Car: Peugeot 106 Rallye
- Color: Bianca White
- Voiced by: Nana Mizuki (CD Drama)
Sari is the daughter of a French diplomat who is related to Akaoka. She grew up with racing cars all around her because her father and Akaoka used to do rallying. She is naturally a good driver, but doesn't show it and drives by feeling and to classical music. She is a very cheerful and childish person and is always smiling as well as having a very feminine and innocent personality.

=== Supporting characters ===
- Toru Takeuchi (武内 徹, Takeuchi Tōru)
- Car: Honda City Turbo (GA2)
- Color: Taffeta White
- Voiced by: Atsushi Kisaichi (CD Drama)
Toru is a high school friend of Ryoko's since junior high. They seem to be close and he has a crush on Ryoko. He is Takao's little brother, which is how Ryoko met Sawako. He does not have a car until later in the manga when he buys a Honda City Turbo. Although he does not have an impressive car, Toru seems to know a lot about street racing through his brother. Throughout the manga, he gives Ryoko moral support.
- Takao Takeuchi (武内 タカオ, Takeuchi Takao)
- Car: Nissan Skyline GT-R (R32)
- Color: Sparkling Silver Metallic
- Voiced by: Toshiyuki Morikawa (CD Drama)
Takao is the older brother of Toru and friend of Sawako Morita, but is oblivious to Sawako's feelings for him.
- Akaoka (赤岡)
- Car: Mercedes-Benz 190E
A mysterious old man who owns a junkyard where Ryoko purchased her MR2. He knows a lot about cars and driving techniques. He is Sari's uncle. He also helps Ryoko with her car and driving techniques.
- Takuro Aso (麻生 拓郎, Asō Takurō)
- Car: Nissan Silvia K's (S13)
- Color: Lightning Yellow
Nicknamed Danmaru (弾丸), Takuro met Sawako at the lingerie bar she was working at. Later we find out he lives in the same apartment complex as Ryoko. He drives a S13 Silvia decked out with a body kit, which he calls "The Brown Bullet." Unfortunately for all the flashy body modifications, he is not a very good driver. He has a very goofy personality and he seems to have a crush on Ryoko and often get into conflict with Toru with things inclusive of Ryoko. He also works at an autoshop.
- Bob (ボブ, Bobu)
- Car: Toyota Supra RZ (JZA80)
A Murakami Tire Shop salesman who is racing buddies with Danmaru. Later went on to the training course Akaoka made together with Danmaru, Sarutani and Ryoko.
- Sarutani (猿谷)
- Car: Nissan 180SX Type-X (S13)
Nicknamed Saru, a small guy from Kansai region. Saru is usually seen with Bob in the series. Works for Iwami Metals that manufactures metal parts.
- Tachikawa (立川)
Nicknamed Doremon. An employee working at Akaoka's scrap yard. He may be a quiet guy, but he is very smart and knowledgeable about cars. He is the one who helped Ryoko into getting an apartment. He could also potentially judge the mood of the situation and defuse it or ignite the mood up promptly and also often seen hoarding tons of spare parts just in case for a need of emergency and often help Ryoko out with her car parts.

=== Repley ===
Repley (リプリー, Ripurī) is an all-girl racing team driving performance-variant Honda Civics. It is led by Mayumi Koreishi.

- Mayumi Koreishi (是石 真由美, Koreishi Mayumi)
Car: Honda Civic SiR (EG6), later switches to a Honda Civic Type-R (EK9)
Color: Granada Black Pearl (EG6)
- Ayano Sanjo (三条 綾乃, Sanjō Ayano)
Car: Honda Civic Type-R (EK9)
Color: Vouge Silver Metallic
- Kaoru (馨)
Car: Honda Civic Type R (EK9)
- Kei Iwabuchi (岩斑 圭, Iwabuchi Kei)
Car: Honda Civic SiR (EK4)
Color: Starlight Black Pearl

=== Normal Wolf ===
- Satoru Mikami (三上 智, Mikami Satoru)
Car: Nissan Silvia K's (S13)
Color: Pearl White (manga), Red (live-action)
- Tsutomu Mikami (三上 勉, Mikami Tsutomu)
Car: Mitsubishi Mirage Cyborg ZR (CJ4A), also drives a Mazda RX-7 (FC3S)
Color: Janpanish Yellow (CJ4A), Lightning Yellow (FC3S)

Younger brother of Satoru Mikami. His father was a car engineer. Tsutomu is a good and helpful friend to Ryoko, but also has romantic feelings for her.

=== Axrobat ===
- Ryo Goda (郷田 亮, Gōda Ryō)
Car: Mazda RX-7 Type-R (FD3S)
Color: Vintage Red
- Tatsuya Kusaka (日下 達也, Kusaka Tatsuya)
Car: Toyota Chaser Tourer V (JZX100)
Color: Wine Red Mica
- Shoji Ozono (大園 昭二, Ōzono Shōji)
Car: Nissan Sileighty (RPS13)
Color: Super Red
- Souichi Tokura (戸倉 宗一, Tokura Sōichi)
Car: Toyota Sprinter Trueno GT-APEX (AE86)
Color: Unknown
- Hiroshi Yamamoto (山本 洋, Yamamoto Hiroshi)
Car: Nissan Silvia (S13)
Color: Unknown
- Owner (オーナー, Ōnā)

== TEAM39 ==
TEAM39 is the name for the staff who collaborated with Yamaguchi on the manga.

- Yuji Matsuda (松田勇次) – Co-screenplay writer & technical writer
- Iwami Yoshiro (岩見吉郎) – Co-screenplay writer
- Akihiko Tajima (田島昭彦) – Mac Design
- Hiroto Hirose (広瀬直人) – Editor

== Media ==
=== Manga ===
- Over Rev! Manga Original Japanese Release – 31 Volumes (1997–2004)
- Over Rev! Manga Japanese Re-release – 15 Volumes (2008–2009)

The original tankōbon manga of the series was created by Katsumi Yamaguchi (山口かつみ) and Team39. It began serialization in seinen manga magazine Weekly Young Sunday and has a total of 31 volumes that were released between May 1997 and November 2004. The manga cover art contains the main characters and featured cars.

In 2008, the manga collection was re-released in bunkoban format, which maintained the same story, but with thicker volumes with a total of 15 volumes and different cover art with a black background that focused only on the featured cars.

Over Rev! was officially published in traditional Chinese (title: 極速傳說) and Indonesian by Comics World (Hong Kong) and Level Comics, respectively.

=== Sequel ===
On March 14, 2019, a manga sequel called Cross Over Rev! (クロスオーバーレブ！) was released online with its first chapter. The setting takes place 10 years after Ryoko returns to Japan and meets a new character named Moto, a high school girl who also loves cars.

=== Live action film ===
The series was adapted into live action film and was released as direct to video (V-Cinema), starring Chika Mitsubayashi (三林千夏) as Ryoko Shino. The movie began its rental release on April 26, 2001, and only available on VHS. It was directed by Atsushi Muroga, who also directed the 2009 Wangan Midnight live action film that is also based on street racing manga with the same name.

=== CD drama ===
Bandai Music Entertainment released a 46-minute CD drama of the manga series on April 21, 1999.

Cast

- Yukiko Mannaka as Ryoko Shino
- Michiko Neya as Sawako Morita
- Kumiko Nishihara as Aika Katayama
- Nana Mizuki as Sari Tachibana
- Atsushi Kisaichi as Toru Takeuchi
- Toshiyuki Morikawa as Takao Takeuchi

Track listing

1. Chapter 1: これからの助走
2. Chapter 2: こんなんじゃ迷走
3. Chapter 3: このまんま疾走
4. Chapter 4: あたしのスタートライン

=== Anime and OVA ===
There were plans for an anime and original video animation (OVA) adaptation of the manga. Takao Yoshioka, most known for his work on other anime such as Your Lie in April, Working!!, No Matter How I Look at It, It's You Guys' Fault I'm Not Popular!, and Elfen Lied, would be in charge Over Rev!'s screenplay and series composition. Yoshioka stated that the animation would cover material up to volume 3 in the manga, but the series did not reach production.

== External websites ==
- Over Rev! (manga) at Anime News Network's encyclopedia
