= Deai-kei =

"For an encounter" in Japanese

Deaikei (出会い系) means something "for an encounter" in Japanese.

Deai kissa (出会い喫茶) are coffee shops where men look at girls through a one way mirror and try to start the date if they like the girl. Some coffee shops have been raided because of anti-prostitution laws.

Deaikei saito (出会い系サイト) refers to online dating websites. The earliest online dating websites emerged in 1995. NTT Docomo introduced i-Mode in 1999, which allowed users to access the internet through mobile phones. This allowed people to easily access the internet, and contributed to the increase in online dating website users in Japan. These became popular after laws regulating other dating services such as Telephone Clubs were passed in the late 1990s.

== Criminal activity ==
Since the internet gives users anonymity, these websites have been used to commit various crimes including prostitution, false billing and false invoicing, kidnapping, assault and battery, rape, extortion, and murder. As these internet dating websites became a successful business model, the number of service providers has increased. The increased business has resulted in increased reports of criminal activity and has become a social problem in Japan.

In the 2011 "Arrest Data on Crimes Involving Dating Websites" report released by the National Police Agency (NPA), several crimes including the violation of the Law to Regulate Solicitation through Matching Business via Internet Sites, Child Welfare Act, Provision of Child Pornography and Other Related Activities were listed among other crimes. The number of prosecutions in that year was 1,421. Although 22 of these include crimes such as murder and rape, the vast majority are violations of laws dealing with the child pornography and the welfare of children.

== Legislation ==
Online services allow people to arrange meetings on a mutually agreed time and place online. The services these websites provide have been used to solicit prostitution by minors. In 2001, 888 individuals were arrested for crimes involving solicitation of minors on these websites. That number increased 2.6 times to 793 just in the first half of the following year. This number included 400 cases of minors soliciting sex online, which was triple the amount recorded in the previous year. As a result, in 2003, the National Diet passed the Law to Regulate Solicitation through Matching Business via Internet Sites. This law prohibits the solicitation of minors for purposes of prostitution and also prohibits the posting of sexual solicitation messages on internet message and forum boards. The law outlines regulations for both the users and the service providers. Penalties for violations can result in varying degrees of punishment ranging from a fine of 100,000 yen and up to one year of imprisonment. The law was subsequently amended in 2008 to address the increase in sex crimes involving minors by strengthening regulations and increasing penalties of offenders. The amendment requires website administrators to register with the Public Safety Commission. It also requires the websites to confirm the identity and age of users to prevent minors from gaining access to its services. Websites must check the identity of new users upon registration by having the users upload a photograph of a valid government-issued identification such as a driver's license or a passport.
