= Yoshiki Tonogai =

Japanese manga artist

Yoshiki Tonogai 外海 良基
- Born: March 14 Shiga Prefecture, Japan
- Area: Manga artist
- Notable works: Doubt
- Awards: Square Enix Awards special grand prize

Yoshiki Tonogai (Japanese: 外海 良基, Hepburn: Tonogai Yoshiki; born March 14) is a Japanese manga artist from Shiga Prefecture, Japan. He is notable as the illustrator of one of the Higurashi When They Cry manga adaptations, Time Killing Arc. He is also the creator of Doubt, which was completed in February 2009. He followed up the Doubt series with two spiritual sequels, Judge and Secret, all connected by the recurring appearance of the iconic Rabbit mask from Doubt. Doubt has been published in the US by Yen Press in its entirety in two volumes in April and July 2013, and the entire six-book series of Judge and the three-book series of Secret have been published by them as well. They have also been published in various countries in Europe.

Tonogai is a former assistant of Atsushi Ohkubo, and he has left a message commemorating the Soul Eater anime adaptation in the Spring 2008 issue of Fresh Gangan.

== Works ==
Title	Year	Notes	Refs
Higurashi When They Cry: Time-Killing Arc	2006	Serialized in Monthly Shōnen Gangan; Published by Square Enix, 2 volumes	
Doubt	2007–09	Serialized in Monthly Shōnen Gangan; Published by Square Enix, 4 volumes	
Judge	2010–12	Serialized in Monthly Shōnen Gangan; Published by Square Enix, 6 volumes	
Secret	2013–15	Serialized in Monthly Shōnen Gangan; Published by Square Enix, 3 volumes	
Ikitemasu ka? Handa-kun	2015–18	Serialized in Monthly Shōnen Gangan; Published by Square Enix, 3 volumes	
Dead Company	2019–20	Serialized in Comic Boost; Published by Gentosha, 3 volumes	
