= Reiko Momochi =

Japanese shōjo manga artist

Reiko Momochi (ももち 麗子, Momochi Reiko; born February 25 (year unknown) in Tokyo) is a Japanese shōjo manga artist best known for Confidential Confessions.

== Confidential Confessions ==
Confidential Confessions (jap. 問題提起作品集, Mondaiteiki sakuhinshū, literally „collection of works dealing with problems“) is a series of short stories first serialised in the manga magazine Dessert by publisher Kodansha from 2000 to 2002 and later collected in several tankōbon volumes. Each of the stand-alone episodes deals with a different problem of teenaged girls such as suicide, self-harm, sexual harassment, prostitution and bullying.

== Daisy ==
In 2012, Daisy (original title: デイジー 〜3.11 女子高生たちの選択〜, Deijī 〜3.11 joshikōsei-tachi no sentaku〜, literally „Daisy – the decision of the March 11 high school girls“) was also serialised in Dessert. This manga is based on the novel Pierrot by Teruhiro Kobayashi, Darai Kusanagi and Tomoji Nobuta. It tells the fictional story of a high school girl from Fukushima-shi and the aftermath of the 2011 Fukushima Daiichi nuclear disaster which affects the lives of her and her schoolmates. Although they live far away from the contaminated evacuation zone, they have to face problems such as the fear of long-term consequences of possible exposure to radiation, many schoolmates relocating to other prefectures, the decline of the farming and tourism sectors which causes financial trouble for their parents, and social ostracism by people from other parts of Japan. In 2014, Daisy was published in French in two volumes by publisher Akata as Daisy, lycéennes à Fukushima („Daisy, high schoolers in Fukushima“), and in 2016 in German as a single volume by publisher Egmont under the title Daisy aus Fukushima („Daisy from Fukushima“); part of the sales revenue from this edition went to a relief fund for children from Fukushima.

== Tokenai koi to chokorēto ==
Tokenai koi to chokorēto (とけない恋とチョコレート, literally „unmelting love and chocolate“) was also serialised in Dessert and subsequently published in two volumes in 2016. It is about Tamako, a ninth-grader who confesses her love to a classmate on Valentine's Day, and her mysterious rival for the boy's love. The manga was published in German by Egmont under the title Bittersweet Chocolate (2018) and in Korean by Hacchae Cultural History as 녹지 않는 사랑과 초콜릿 („chocolate and love“, 2018).

== Selected other manga ==
- 神様に見捨てられた20日間, Kamisama ni misutereta 20 hiai, 2005
- こころ, Kokoro, 2006
- ジンクス!!!, Jinx!!!, 2013
- 大人の問題提起シリーズ さけび, Otona no mondaiteiki shirīzu Sakebi, 2018; published in French by Akata under the title Moi aussi
