= Ikigami: The Ultimate Limit =

Japanese manga series by Motoro Mase

- Manga volume 1 cover

イキガミ (Ikigami)
- Genre: Dystopia; Psychological thriller; Science fiction
- Manga
- Written by: Motoro Mase
- Published by: Shogakukan
- English publisher: NA: Viz Media
- Magazine: Weekly Young Sunday (2005–2008); Weekly Big Comic Spirits (2008–2012)
- Original run: January 27, 2005 – February 6, 2012
- Volumes: 10
- Manga

Ikigami: Sairin
- Written by: Motoro Mase
- Published by: Shogakukan
- Magazine: Big Comic
- Original run: September 10, 2021 – present
- Volumes: 1
- Live-action film
- Ikigami (2008)

Ikigami: The Ultimate Limit (イキガミ, Ikigami) is a Japanese manga series written and illustrated by Motoro Mase. The manga was serialized in Shogakukan's Weekly Young Sunday (2005–2008) and Weekly Big Comic Spirits (2008–2012). The story takes place in a dystopian nation where a national prosperity law has been passed resulting in citizens between the ages of 18 and 24 being randomly selected to die for the good of the nation. These citizens are given 24-hour notification of their impending death—the ostensible reason for this system being to help demonstrate the value of life. These notifications are known as "ikigami".

The manga was adapted into a live-action film titled Ikigami in 2008 with Tomoyuki Takimoto as its director.

== Plot summary ==
In first grade, all students receive an inoculation. A small percentage of these inoculations includes a nano capsule which will kill the receiver somewhere between the ages of 18 and 24. The government believes that the threat of unexpected death will increase prosperity and productivity in its citizens. And indeed this increased prosperity is evident, but at a great cost: innocent lives. Citizens who do not agree with the National prosperity law and who publicly voice their opinions are accused of "thought crime."

Kengo Fujimoto has been recruited by the government as an Ikigami delivery man. Whilst undergoing training he witnesses the "arrest" of a man (also undergoing training to become a deliverer) who commits a thought-crime when he yells to the entire room that the law is wrong and that his older sister died from the ikigami. The film follows Kengo as he delivers Ikigami to three citizens: a rising musician debuting in the music industry but struggling with leaving his friend behind as a busker, a shut-in who is the son of a council woman who supports the law whole-heartedly and attempts to use her son's upcoming death to gain sympathy votes, and a working-class debt collector who is about to take his blind sister out of the orphanage she lives in now that he is finally financially secure.

During the film we discover that thought-crime criminals are most likely brain-washed and then returned to society, strongly believing in the national prosperity law when they return. Throughout the film Kengo struggles not to commit thought-crimes publicly as he feels that the law is wrong. Towards the end of the film Kengo walks past a school where the year ones are entering; there are nurses encouraging children to have their inoculations. Kengo sees the man who was taken from his Ikigami deliverance training, standing in a lab coat encouraging the children to get their inoculations, supporting the brainwashing theory.

== Media ==
=== Manga ===
Ikigami: The Ultimate Limit, written and illustrated by Motoro Mase, was serialized in Shogakukan's Weekly Young Sunday from January 27, 2005, to July 31, 2008, when the magazine ceased its publication. The manga continued in Shogakukan's Weekly Big Comic Spirits from September 6, 2008, and finished on February 6, 2012. Shogakukan collected its chapters in ten tankōbon' volumes, released between August 5, 2005, and March 30, 2012.

The manga was licensed in North America by Viz Media, which released the first tankōbon volume on May 12, 2009. The manga is also licensed in France by Asuka, in Spain and Italy by Panini Comics, in Taiwan by Sharp Point Press, in Korea by Haksan Culture Company, in Poland by Hanami, and Indonesia by Level Comics

A sequel manga series titled Ikigami: Sairin began serialization in Shogakukan's Big Comic magazine on September 10, 2021. The series is set to reach the climax of its fifth season on May 24, 2024. Shogakukan published its first volume on June 30, 2022.

=== Film ===
The manga was adapted into a live-action film titled Ikigami in 2008 with Tomoyuki Takimoto as its director.

== Reception ==
The manga was nominated for the Angoulême International Comics Festival. As of May 2009, it has sold over 1 million copies in Japan.
