= Hoshi no Furumachi =

Japanese manga series

ほしのふるまち
- Manga
- Written by: Hidenori Hara
- Published by: Shogakukan
- Magazine: Weekly Young Sunday
- Original run: 2006 – 2008
- Volumes: 7

Hoshi no Furumachi (ほしのふるまち; lit. "The Town the Stars Fall Upon") is a manga written and illustrated by Hidenori Hara.

== Live Action film ==
It was adapted into a live-action film in 2011.
