= Red Eyes (manga) =

Japanese manga series

- Cover of volume 1

レッドアイーズ (Reddoaiizu)
- Genre: Military
- Manga
- Written by: Jun Shindo
- Published by: Kodansha
- Magazine: Monthly Shōnen Magazine GREAT (1999-2009), Magazine E-no (2009–2011), Monthly Shonen Magazine+ (2011-2014), Comic Days (2018-)
- Original run: September, 1999 – present
- Volumes: 28

Red Eyes (レッドアイーズ, Reddoaiizu) (stylized as redEyes) is a Japanese manga series written and illustrated by Jun Shindo and published by Kodansha. The manga is licensed for a French-language release in France, a German-language release in Germany and an Italian-language release by Panini Comics.

== Overview ==
A fictional sci-fi war chronicle depicting a war between two nations set in the future, characterized by an elaborate setting and worldview. Although it is set in the future, the form of warfare has degraded into mostly visual-range hand-to-hand combat due to the collapse of electronic warfare and an effected incapability to use traditional weapons of mass destruction. Advanced weapons and equipment flying at very high altitudes (intercontinental ballistic bombs, high-altitude bombers, etc.) are set to be automatically shot down by a group of 24 strategic military satellites called the "Orbiter Eyes," which exist in geostationary satellite orbit, said to be currently uncontrollable. Because of that and high-tech weaponry becoming too expensive and time-consuming to maintain for large-scale combat, a type of powered exoskeleton suit known as Special Assault Armor (SAA) was developed and deployed on the battlefield to augment the strength of infantry for visual-range land warfare. SAA are single piloted exoskeleton power armors used as an all-in-one packaged ground assault vehicle for both conventional and urban combat. All SAA, aside from their powered and armored exosuits which provide augmented speed, strength and protection, are outfitted with encrypted radio communications, a heads-up display (HUD), a hovercraft-like propulsion jetpack and thruster system for movement on land, along with various defensive and utility-based equipment, and assorted armaments. A fully-equipped, top-of-the-line SAA is said to be roughly equivalent to a modern main battle tank in terms of combat effectiveness. Pilots of these SAA are also colloquially dubbed "cladders."

== Synopsis ==
At the start of the series, the Republic of Legium (interchangeably spelled as Regium) is locked in a costly war with the Dragnov Federation, two countries that were once one and known as the Kingdom of Loomis. Dragnov wanted to reunify the two countries within its Federation and invaded part of Legium territory with a "peacekeeping force," but Legium was bitterly opposed to this and mobilized their armed forces in response, officially starting the war. Partly due to winter conditions, the Legium forces had the upper hand at the beginning of the war. As the war dragged on, this changed and the Dragnov forces eventually came close to overrunning Legium's final line of defense around the capital of Solgren. It was then that Dragnov unveiled its new weapon, a high-yield, low-altitude missile which was detonated indirectly 8 km outside the capital city yet still causing notable damage. This convinced the Legium politicians to negotiate for a surrender, although the Third Army of Legium, later to be known as Legium People's Army, refused to obey and continued the fight.

The story follows Captain Grahalt Mills, commander of the Legium special forces "Jackal" unit which utilizes the most advanced SAA to date. With the last line of defense faltering, the Jackals are deployed in a last-ditch attempt to hold the line, and succeed at destroying all opponents in their sector. Unexpectedly though, Mills' subordinates all frame him for the murder of a platoon of Legium soldiers just as the war comes to an end. The Jackals are disbanded after the war and Mills is sentenced to execution, but he escapes from prison and tracks down each of the ex-members of the Jackals to find out why he was betrayed.

The main conflict takes place approximately in Eastern European countries such as Ukraine, Romania, Hungary, Croatia, Bosnia, Serbia, and Bulgaria, whose names and territories, however, have drastically changed. It is eventually revealed that the story takes place some centuries in the future after a devastating World War, and the reason many nations use former American and NATO weaponry is because the United States had previously subjugated the world under the rule of a one world order controlled by itself.

In fact, in this story, the United States succeeded in the Strategic Defence Initiative program (SDI), known here as the Orbiter Eyes, making the US invulnerable to intercontinental ballistic missile (ICBM) attacks. Therefore, the Cold War came to an end when the Soviet Union fell in the mid-eighties. However, the US continued their military programs, eventually succeeding in the construction of the first laser-based superweapon, capable of reducing a city to cinders in seconds. With this huge power the United States created the DUPE (the Democratic Union for Peace on Earth) in 2001, a super-state with a territory encompassing the entire continent of Asia (except most of the Middle East and Turkey), Oceania and America (except Canada). As a consequence of the formation of DUPE, the European Union is transformed into a continental state consisting of previous European NATO countries, but the EU remains a second-rate power in comparison.

The year 2001 became the new first year of the new era, known as 1 GU for Great Unification, the first year of the Great Unification's calendar. However, in 50 GU (2050 AD), an unknown power is able to hack into the SDI system, which forces the system into safe mode and makes it unable to process orders from the DUPE command centre (apart from its original mission to intercept any launched ICBMs and missiles). As a result of losing its global deterrence system, the other countries of the planet launch a full-scale attack against the DUPE forces, beginning the 20-year war (World War III). The war ends de facto in 70 GU (2070 AD) with no winner and the death of half the population of the planet, while all main actors of the war are eventually dissolved and cease to exist following the mutual destruction.

Nations and alliances are created, formed, and destroyed in the course of the war. One of the resulting nations is the Loomis Kingdom, a new state incorporating the (approximate) former nations of Ukraine, Poland, Slovakia, Romania, and Bulgaria. In 87 GU (2087 AD), a nationalist revolt results in the fall of the monarchy and the creation of the Republic of Legium (formerly Romania and Bulgaria). The remaining three states remain independent until 129 GU (2129 AD), when the countries decide to form the Dragnov Federation. In 179 GU (2179 AD) the Dragnov Federation and the Legium Republic go to war with each other, which lasts until 182 GU (2182 AD). The war results in the loss of two million soldiers for the Federation and 2.2 million soldiers and eight million civilians for the Legium. The Federation is able to launch a new type of missile against the Republic which is undetectable from the Orbiter Eyes that are still carrying on their original mission after 110 years.

== Characters ==
=== Jackals ===
Although there are eight Jackals in total, including Mills, oddly no mention of the missing eighth member is made when Mills asks both Waldmann and Lenny for information on the other members of the Jackals.

==== Captain Grahalt Mills ====
Nicknamed "Genocide" for destroying superior amounts of Dragnov troops alone, he prefers to work alone on the battlefield. He is a master of all forms of combat, managing to escape from a high security prison while killing the special forces soldiers who were guarding him. In the beginning, he swears vengeance on those who have betrayed him but later decides to join the Third Army, feeling his original mission not complete and that he has a better chance to expose Krayz's plan.

==== Lieutenant Julian Krayz ====
Mills's second-in-command, he organized the mutiny against his commander. On a mission to eliminate enemy forces, he killed friendly Legium soldiers and used their deaths to frame Mills as a traitor who attempted to defect to Dragnov. After the war, he becomes Colonel in the Dragnov armed forces as well as remaining lieutenant in the Legium forces, effectively drawing pay from two armies. He later reveals that he is a direct descendant of the Loomis Kingdom's royal dynasty and used the war to accelerate his plan to reestablish the Loomis Kingdom. For this purpose, he also tries to gain access to the Orbiter Eyes, believing he can obtain the key to operate the system.

==== Captain Mikhail Waldman ====
Waldman becomes captain of the GIGN's (Legium's SWAT) 1st armored unit after the war. A proud but ambitious soldier, he attempts to kill Mills before the war ends by asking a homeless boy to give Mills a booby-trapped package; Mills survives and becomes captain of the Jackals instead, a position that would have gone to Waldman if Mills had died. Waldman betrays Mills because he feels that Legium has lost the war, and because he failed to kill Mills previously. He is eventually killed by Mills after apologizing.

==== Lieutenant Lenny Kruger ====
A close friend that is indebted to Mills. Back as infantry soldiers, Kruger was once wounded by a sniper to be used as bait, but Mills takes two rounds dragging him to safety, nearly costing his own life. He ends up betraying Mills because Krayz was using his sister, Leila, as a hostage, though she actually becomes his subordinate after the war. He later fights against Mills, but it becomes clear he has no intention to kill him. Once defeated, Kruger begs Mills to kill him, feeling unworthy; however, Mills forgives him for his betrayal and "orders" him to join Mills' group. He later returns to be Mills' trusted aide and second-in-command and a valuable soldier in the Third Army.

==== Barros Ward ====
Renowned as the best marksman in the Legium army yet he hated killing. Barros used a unique sniper variant of the Swashbuckler model of SAA. During the war, he had sent his sick brother to a military hospital for treatment, and it's implied that Krayz uses him as a hostage to get him to betray Mills. His brother dies anyway, and Barros quits the army to live a quiet life in the mountains, making a promise to never kill again. Visited by Mills, he later decides to temporarily forswear his oath in order to help him reach the Legium Third Army. Barros ends up sacrificing his life in a sniping operation against a Dragnovian 155mm high-precision, mounted artillery cannon that stops all Legium forces, including Mills and his company, from crossing the mountains to reach the Third Army. He manages to fire a nigh impossible sniper shot directly down the barrel of the turret from a location 11 km away but takes a direct hit from the cannon in the process.

==== Klaus Gardner ====
Gardner betrays Mills because he wants the war to end, but later joins the Third Army and is in charge of supply and logistics. He is secretly operating under Krayz, feeding him information about Mills' activities.

==== Rod Cerioni ====
Cerioni joins the Third Army after the war, but has not been seen since trying to get Barros to join him in the Third Army. It is later revealed that he actually left the Army to join Krayz's plan and that he originally wanted to employ Barros to assassinate the commander-in-chief of the Dragnov forces in Legium, but was unsuccessful. He is later able to complete the mission himself, sneaking in the Dragnov occupation forces headquarters and executing the commander-in-chief, disguised as a janitor.

=== Others ===
==== Saya Hamilton ====
Hamilton is a homeless, orphaned teenager who stayed in the derelict building Mills used as bait to lure Waldman. She insists on staying with Mills afterward. Her hometown was in the process of being evacuated at the end of the war when trigger-happy Dragnovian troops blew up a refugee truck carrying her family and friends.

==== Colonel Coulthard ====
A war hero for Legium, he was the commander of the Ranger Regiment, an inter-service special forces unit. He recruits Mills while he is working as a pump attendant at a gas station, when ordinarily only the most elite members of the military would have a chance to be selected. Near the end of training, Colonel Coulthard leads a rebellion with several platoons of active-duty Rangers to seize the SAA and other military equipment at the training camp. The rebellion force's intention was to usurp the Legium government and incite the war with Dragnov to bring pride and valor back to the country as they were dismayed by their government's lack of honor and integrity. Coulthard, however, deliberately planned a direct confrontation with Mills first to test his resolve. This ends up with Coulthard forcing his apprentice to kill him after a hard-fought battle. His death completes Mills' transformation into the ultimate killing machine, "Genocide," who proceeds to single-handedly wipe out the heavily armed rebelling force.

==== Lieutenant Leila Kruger ====
She is the sister of Lenny Kruger, and adjutant of Krayz, whom she has an intimate relationship with. She believes Krayz will bring peace to the world.

==== Colonel Leon Reedus ====
Reedus is the genius strategist of the Third Army, with characteristically unkempt hair and stubble. He is largely responsible for the Third Army's success, and partly responsible for the "Miracle of Lent", wherein Reedus directed the eight members of the Jackals to hold off an entire Dragnovian armored division for two days.
