= Atomu =

- Gender: Male

Origin
- Origin: Japanese
- Meaning: Different meanings depending on the kanji used

Atomu (written: 亜土夢, 亜人夢, 亜斗夢, 亜飛夢 or アトム in katakana) is a masculine Japanese given name. Notable people with the name include:

- Atomu Mizuishi (水石 亜飛夢; born 1996), Japanese actor
- Atomu Nabeta (鍋田 亜人夢; born 1991), Japanese footballer
- Atomu Shimojō (下條 アトム; born 1946), Japanese actor and voice actor
- Atomu Shigenaga (重永 亜斗夢; born 1988), Japanese golfer
- Atomu Tanaka (田中 亜土夢; born 1987), Japanese footballer
- Tetsuwan Atomu (鉄腕アトム) aka Astro Boy, manga protagonist
