= Hidenori Hara =

Japanese manga artist

Hidenori Hara (原秀則, Hara Hidenori; born June 14, 1961 in Akashi, Hyōgo, Japan) is a Japanese manga artist. He won the 1988 Shogakukan Manga Award for shōnen for his manga Just Meet and Fuyu Monogatari.

== Works ==
- Aozora (青空, Aozora)
- Train Man (電車男, Densha Otoko?)
- Free Kick!
- Fuyu Monogatari (冬物語, Fuyu Monogatari)
- G -Gokudo Girl- (ジー, G -Gokudo Girl-)
- Itsudemo Yumewo (いつでも夢を, Itsudemo Yumewo)
- Just Meet (ジャストミート, Just Meet)
- Regatta (レガッタ 君といた永遠, Regatta Kimi to Ita Eien)
- Shō mo Nai Bokura no Renai-ron
- Someday (サムデイ, Someday)
- Uchi ni Oideyo (部屋においでよ, Uchi ni Oideyo)
- When You Wish Upon a Star (ほしのふるまち, Hoshi no Furu Machi)
- Yattarou Jan!! (やったろうじゃん！！, Yattarou Jan!!)
