= List of Rainbow: Nisha Rokubō no Shichinin episodes =

Rainbow: Nisha Rokubō no Shichinin (RAINBOW 二舎六房の七人, Reinbō: Ni-sha roku bō no shichi-nin), is a Japanese manga series written by George Abe and illustrated by Masasumi Kakizaki. Episodes are called "Crimes". The anime's opening theme is "We're Not Alone" by Coldrain and the ending theme is "A Far-Off Distance" by Galneryus, both signed to VAP.

== Episode list ==
No.	Title	Directed by	Written by	Original release date
1	"After the rain"	Ayako Kurata	Hideo Takayashiki	April 6, 2010
The year, 1955. Six delinquents nicknamed Mario, Cabbage, Soldier, Turtle, Uncovered, and Joe are taken to a prison-like reform school due to their various crimes. They are introduced to Dr. Sasaki, the school physician, who performs a painful rectal exam on each boy. Humiliated, they are led to their cell-like room, where they met a boy named Sakuragi. Mario starts a fight with Sakuragi, culminating in Sakuragi knocking out all six boys. Ishihara, the school's sadistic head guard, violently beats Sakuragi as punishment while the others watch. Later after Sakuragi regains consciousness, he accepts a stashed cigarette from Joe, then proceeds to share it with the others. Sakuragi's strong, yet benevolent actions immediately earns him the respect and admiration of the six boys.
2	"Fugitive"	Kazuhiro Yoneda	Hideo Takayashiki	April 13, 2010
The seven boys have become comrades and spend time working out in their cell. Joe reveals that he has a younger sister on the outside. Seeing her again is his sole motivation to endure the school. Joe later receives a visit from the orphanage administrator where his sister is staying saying his sister is about to be adopted. Afraid he will not see her again, Sakuragi and the other boys cause a distraction allowing Joe to escape through an unguarded entrance. The boys are beaten and placed in solitary confinement. Turtle recounts losing his entire family in the atomic bombing of Hiroshima and why he helped Joe escape. Joe arrives at the orphanage and attempts to escape with his sister but is caught by the police. Joe's sister 'rejects' him and sends him away (in an attempt to protect him). Distraught, Joe is returned to the school and placed in solitary.
3	"Distrust"	Masahiro Hosoda; Tomoya Tanaka	Mitsutaka Hirota	April 20, 2010
Joe leaves solitary and Sakuragi's words are able to comfort him. Joe resolves to survive and one day reunite with his sister. Ishihara tells Uncovered that Sakuragi murdered his parents. Uncovered confronts Sakuragi in the mess hall, resulting in the two almost coming to blows. Sakuragi is taken and beaten by Ishihara who greatly hates Sakuragi for being the lone student in the school who is not afraid of him. Uncovered remembers his early childhood being poor and how his mother was sexually exploited to get food, causing him to develop a distrust in others. Ishihara discovers Uncovered with a stash of hidden cigarettes. Using Uncovered's fear of him, Ishihara schemes to implicate Sakuragi. A fire, ignited by one of Uncovered's tossed cigarettes, causes an evacuation of the cells. Uncovered is horrified when Ishihara purposely throws away the key to Cell 6, in an attempt to kill Sakuragi. Sakuragi confronts Uncovered outside and learns the other boys are trapped in the burning building and rushes back inside in an attempt to save them.
4	"Dissolve"	Ayako Kurata	Mitsutaka Hirota	April 27, 2010
Uncovered can't believe Sakuragi would risk his own life for someone else, believing that you can only rely on yourself. Sakuragi arrives at the cell, but can't open the door. The building begins to collapse and Sakuragi is knocked down by flaming debris. Outside, Uncovered searches for the lost cell key and locates its. Ishihara arrives and demands the key but Uncovered refuses to give it up. Uncovered enters the building and saves Sakuragi and the others. They escape and then Sakuragi knocks out the shocked Ishihara. Sakuragi is taken to the hospital to recover from his injuries. He tells a nurse about how he greatly admired his father, a soldier. However, after the war, his father returned home a broken man. One night, Sakuragi confronted his father saying he had lost all respect for him. A short time later, Sakuragi's father commits suicide. Sakuragi believes he 'murdered' his father, because he didn't try to understand his father's pain and believes his hurtful words drove his father to kill himself. Sakuragi doesn't want to lose anyone else important to him and that the other boys are his best friends. Overhearing this story, the bond between the seven becomes even stronger.
5	"Someday…"	Miho Hirao	Hideo Takayashiki	May 4, 2010
After leaving the hospital, Sakuragi reunites with his cellmates. A new guard, Kumagai, has replaced Ishihara who is on house arrest related to the fire. While doing community service outside one day, the boys each relate their dreams. Before returning to the school, the boys carve their dreams into a large tree and promise to meet back at the spot after they get out of the school. Ishihara returns and conspires to with Dr. Sasaki to deal with Sakuragi, who will be released in a month. They remove Sakuragi from cell 2-6 and place him in another cell with several large, strong boys. They beat him nightly, yet Sakuragi continues to bear the pain and smile, frustrating them. Mario, learning of the beatings, begs to take Sakuragi place in exchange for them sparing him. They beat Mario and shatter his right hand with a large stone. That night, the bullies taunt Sakuragi with what they did to Mario. After hearing they shattered Mario's hand, Sakuragi pulverizes the ringleader's face with a single punch. The other bullies stare in shock as Sakuragi's tells them that he was willing to put up with their abuse, but that they crossed the line when they attacked his friend.
6	"Truth"	Woo Seung-wook	Mitsutaka Hirota	May 11, 2010
The other bullies attack Sakuragi, while Ishihara listens from outside the cell. Ishihara leaves content that Sakuragi will be bludgeoned to death by morning. In the morning, Ishihara opens the cell, but is horrified to see all the bullies beaten and bloody on the floor. Cowed by the beating they suffered, none of the bullies are willing to admit it was Sakuragi's fault, causing Ishihara to leave in a rage. Unable to intimidate Sakuragi, Dr. Sasaki suggests Ishihara make Sakuragi break the rules by hurting his friends. Realizing Ishihara's goal, the boys bear the abuse to protect Sakuragi. Sakuragi, no longer able to watch, grabs Ishihara and is in turn placed in solitary confinement. Ishihara plans to starve Sakuragi to death saying that he and Sasaki can't let him out because of what he knows. One year earlier, Sakuragi had a roommate named Ei'ichi who was sexually molested by Dr. Sasaki. Unable to live with the constant abuse, Ei'ichi committed suicide. Guard Kumagai reveals Ishihara's plans to the boys in 2-6. Turtle manages to sneak food to Sakuragi's cell, restoring his will to survive.
7	"Determination"	Tetsuo Yajima	Hideo Takayashiki	May 18, 2010
Ishihara is apoplectic that Sakuragi is still alive after more than two weeks of starvation, unaware that Turtle and later Guard Kumagai have been sneaking him food. Kumagai tells Mario and Nurse Setsuko about Dr. Sasaki's involvement with Sakuragi mistreatment, unaware that Sasaki is secretly listening. That night when Kumagai brings Sakuragi food he discovers that Sakuragi is being subjected to water torture. Attempting to help Sakuragi, Kumagai is ambushed by Ishihara. Some time later after Kumagai fails to return to the hospital, Mario attempts to leave but is confronted by Ishihara, who reveals that Kumagai died in an 'accident'. Mario returns to the school and tells the others about Sasaki and Kumagai. Knowing Sasaki and Ishihara will not allow Sakuragi to leave alive, Mario and the others plot to free Sakuragi and escape, despite knowing that they'll be sent to juvenile prison if caught.
8	"Freedom"	Kazuhiro Yoneda	Kazuyuki Fudeyasu	May 25, 2010
Uncovered devises a plan to free Sakuragi and shares it with the others. Needing to get a key from Dr. Sasaki, Joe volunteers to go to the doctor's office, despite knowing Sasaki's perverted lusts. Joe fakes a stomach ache and is taken to Sasaki's office, where he 'flirts' with Sasaki. Joe convinces Sasaki to strip naked, and when his back is turned Joe strangles him with a cloth rope and ties him up. He returns to the cell and releases the other boys. Reaching Sakuragi's cell, Mario knock Ishihara unconscious and they carry Sakuragi away. A guard finds Dr. Sasaki tied up and sounds the alarm. Uncovered 'sacrifices' himself to draw the guards attention and manages to cut the electricity to the compound and search lights. At the front gate, Cabbage and Soldier stay behind to block the guards. Outside the compound, Ishihara ambushes the others and tries to stab Sakuragi with a knife, but Mario pummels Ishihara unconscious again. After eluding capture, Mario becomes depressed about losing the others, but Joe and Turtle state that it was Mario's determination which allowed them to save Sakuragi's life.
9	"Lament"	Ayako Kurata	Mitsutaka Hirota	June 1, 2010
After hearing about the escape, Nurse Setsuko encounters Turtle and gives him directions to an unused farmhouse, where they can hide and treat Sakuragi. Setsuko brings medicine, food and clothing, committed to keeping a promise she made to Mario. At the school, Uncovered, Soldier, and Cabbage are put in solitary and Ishihara subjects them to the same water torture he used on Sakuragi. Sakuragi regains consciousness and asks them to return to the school. Later, Dr. Sasaki and Ishihara are shocked when Joe returns, and they attempt to intimidate him. They're confidence quickly turns to horror when Joe reveals that he knows about their involvement in Ei'ichi's suicide. He also reveals that Sakuragi has Ei'ichi's suicide note, which could send Sasaki and Ishihara to prison. Using this information as leverage, Joe gets Cabbage, Soldier, and Uncovered released from solitary and they are no longer beaten or abused. Sakuragi continues to heal while Mario practices boxing. In the market one day, Mario and Turtle meet a woman who is promoting boxing matches at a nearby American army base. Mario enters a boxing match with an American boxer and is completely overwhelmed by the man's size and power. After the match, the promoter woman, Lilly, gives Turtle and Mario money and tells Mario to get stronger. Shamed, Mario resolves to pay Lilly back ten times over.
10	"Vengeance"	Masahiro Hosoda; Tomoya Tanaka	Hideo Takayashiki	June 8, 2010
Sakuragi begins training Mario in boxing so he can win his next match. Turtle takes a job selling black market goods. At the school, Soldier learns that he's been accepted in the Japanese Defense Force and will be leaving the reformatory early. At the farmhouse, Setsuko suggests she and boys take a photo and later borrows a camera from a coworker at the hospital. Dr. Sasaki overhears her conversation and sends Ishihara to follow her, discovering Sakuragi's location. When they're alone, Setsuko confesses her feelings to Sakuragi. Sakuragi and Turtle accompany Mario to his next match, unaware Ishihara is following them. Turtle goes to the nearby market before the match, but is caught by the police. Learning Ishihara was responsible, Turtle attempts to phone the others. Lilly tells Sakuragi and Mario about Turtle being caught and Sakuragi leaves to find a phone. Mario begins his match determined to win. Elsewhere, Dr. Sasaki plots to dispose of both Sakuragi and Ishihara, who is now using speed and has become a liability.
11	"Showdown"	Woo Seung-wook	Kazuyuki Fudeyasu	June 15, 2010
Turtle tells Sakuragi about Ishihara. Sakuragi leaves determined to finish his battle with Ishihara once and for all. Soldier leaves the school with the other boys cheering him on. Sakuragi confronts Ishihara who vents his hatred at Sakuragi and draws a gun. When Ishihara manically promises to kill Setsuko and other boys, Sakuragi disarms him and turns the gun on the terrified Ishihara. Mario continues his match against the American boxer and promises Lilly he'll win. Mario tricks his opponent into letting his guard down and knocks his opponent down, but the boxer gets up before being counted out. Tired of being chased and threatened, Sakuragi gives the shocked Ishihara Ei'ichi's suicide note and leaves. Ishihara, unable to understand, chases him and succeeds in stabbing Sakuragi in the abdomen with a knife. Staring Ishihara down, Sakuragi walks away leading Ishihara to believes he'll never be able to kill Sakuragi. Lilly wants to stop the match, but Mario resolves to continue fighting. Sakuragi pulls the knife from his body and tries to return to the boxing match despite the extreme blood lose. On his way, he is confronted by Dr. Sasaki and the police.
12	"Promise"	Miho Hirao	Mitsutaka Hirota	June 22, 2010
Mario finally succeeds in knocking out his opponent. Outside, the police order Sakuragi to put down the knife, but Sakuragi's only thought is of returning to the boxing match. Several Army MPs arrive, and in the confusion Sakuragi is gunned down, his final thoughts being of his friends and their dreams. Mario returns home and reveals Sakuragi's fate to Setsuko. Later at the morgue, Setsuko collapses in grief causing Mario to wonder where he and the others will go now that Sakuragi is gone. Time passes, and the six surviving friends finally meet at the tree like they promised. Mario relays Sakuragi's final wish that they all strive to fulfill their dreams. Mario and the others then promise to make Sasaki and Ishihara pay for killing Sakuragi. Later, they discover that Sasaki is now running for mayor. While Mario departs to track down Ishihara, the others begin a campaign of intimidation against Sasaki. Mario locates Ishihara, now a mentally-broken speed addict. Ishihara mistakes Mario for Sakuragi and ask to be killed. Mario, angered that Sakuragi lost his life because of such a pathetic man, prepares to kill Ishihara.
13	"Recollect"	Hiroshi Kōjina	Hideo Takayashiki	June 29, 2010
A summary of the previous episodes, told through a series of flashbacks from Mario's point-of-view.
14	"Revenge"	Tetsuo Yajima	Hideo Takayashiki	July 6, 2010
Sasaki, unnerved by his encounter with the boys, locks himself in his office. His thoughts are interrupted by a phone call, and leaves to rendezvous with a 'lover' at a local motel. After arriving, Sasaki is horrified when Joe appears and draws a gun. Joe takes Sasaki to a beach where the other boys have dug a large hole near the water. Despite his attempts to bribe them, the boys bury Sasaki up to his neck as the tide begins to come in. Sasaki screams for mercy as the boys leave saying he'll confess everything. Just when it seems he's about to die, Sasaki wakes up in the motel, unable to discern if what happened was real or a nightmare. Setsuko finds Mario waiting for her and takes him to her apartment. Mario reveals that he spared Ishihara, saying he wasn't worth killing. The next day, Sasaki prepares to give a campaign address but becomes flustered when he sees Joe and Cabbage in the audience. In the sound booth, Turtle, Soldier and Uncovered play a recording of Sasaki confessing to all his crimes, including his part in Ei'ichi and Sakuragi's deaths. Exposed, Sasaki drops out of the mayoral race and loses his hospital. Setsuko prays at Sakuragi's grave saying that she and boys can finally move on. At the tree, Mario gives each of his friends a bullet taken from Sakuragi's body. Their revenge satisfied, they leave to begin pursuing their dreams. Mario looks back at the tree and sees an image of Sakuragi smiling back at him.
15	"Annoyance"	Kazuhiro Yoneda	Hideo Takayashiki	July 13, 2010
16	"Hidden"	Woo Seung-wook	Mitsutaka Hirota	July 20, 2010
17	"Parting"	Ayako Kurata	Hideo Takayashiki	July 27, 2010
18	"Unbreakable"	Masahiro Hosoda; Tomoya Tanaka	Mitsutaka Hirota	August 3, 2010
19	"Reunion"	Ho Pyeong-gang	Mitsutaka Hirota	August 10, 2010
20	"Vocation"	Tetsuo Yajima	Hideo Takayashiki	August 17, 2010
21	"Blinded"	Kazuhiro Yoneda	Hideo Takayashiki	August 24, 2010
22	"Emergence"	Ayako Kurata	Hideo Takayashiki	August 31, 2010
23	"Chance"	Chie Yamashiro	Mitsutaka Hirota	September 7, 2010
24	"Desperate"	Woo Seung-wook	Mitsutaka Hirota	September 14, 2010
25	"Independence"	Woo Seung-wook	Mitsutaka Hirota	September 21, 2010
26	"Over the rainbow"	Ho Pyeong-gang	Hideo Takayashiki	September 28, 2010
Mario receives a visit from Jeffrey, the American boxer, who asks him to visit the Army Camp. Mario obliges and is observed by a professional boxing trainer who comments that Mario's broken right hand will make it impossible to box. He directs Mario to a doctor who may be able to heal his hand. The doctor explains that the surgery will restore his right hand with at 30% success rate but advises if the surgery fails, he will lose the use of his hand. Mario takes the deal remembering Sakuragi's words about taking chances, and the surgery is a success. When his hand heals, Mario visits Sakuragi's mother to pay his respects and is given Sakuragi's boxing boots before heading to his match. Mario, with his restored hand, defeats his opponent in his boxing match. He is later seen at the tree where he and his friends carved their life's dreams into and speaks to the late Sakuragi. After a spontaneous rainstorm, an image of Sakuragi asks Mario what his dream is, to which he replies helping his friends achieve their dreams.
