= Crime 101 =

Crime 101 may refer to:

- Crime 101 (1999 film), also known as Scarfies, a New Zealand black comedy film
- Crime 101 (2026 film), an American-British crime thriller film

- Crime 101, a novella by Don Winslow from which the 2026 film is adapted

- "Crime 101" (The Powerpuff Girls), a 1995 episode of the animated TV series
- "Crime 101: You Give Love a Bad Name" (Rainbow: Nisha Rokubō no Shichinin), a chapter in the manga series
