= List of Rainbow: Nisha Rokubō no Shichinin chapters =

The chapters of Rainbow: Nisha Rokubō no Shichinin are written by George Abe and illustrated by Masasumi Kakizaki. Rainbow: Nisha Rokubou no Shichinin began serialization in Shogakukan Publishing's Weekly Young Sunday manga magazine but was moved to Big Comic Spirits when the magazine stopped publication. The chapters of the manga have been collected into 22 tankōbon volumes by Shogakukan between April 2003 and February 2010.

The story is set in the 1950s and focuses on six junior delinquents aged sixteen to seventeen that are sent to the Shōnan Special Reform School, and their mentor. The boys learn to cope with the atrocities and unfairness they encounter there. The manga follows the boys' lives during their time in the school and the years after they leave.

Individual chapters are called "Crimes".

== Volume list ==
No.	Release date	ISBN
01	April 5, 2003	4-09-153031-1
Crime 1. After the rain; Crime 2. Breaking away; Crime 3. Carry on; Crime 4. Down by law; Crime 5. Eagle fly free; Crime 6. Falling higher; Crime 7. Going down; Crime 8. Hearts on fire; Crime 9. In flames
The manga opens in the year 1955 with six boys (nicknamed Mario, Cabbage, Soldier, Turtle, Scam, and Joe) being transferred by bus to a reform school due to their varied crimes. They meet the institution's physician, Sasaki, who performs rectal exams on the boys before sending them to their cell. There they meet another boy named Sakuragi, who Mario starts a fight with. This results in all six of them getting beaten. After this, Joe pleads Sakuragi not to hurt him if he offers Sakuragi a cigarette he smuggled in. Sakuragi accepts, and shares the cigarette with the rest of the boys. Upon such an experience, the seven boys bond and become close friends. Joe mentions that he is an orphan with a younger sister named Meg on the outside, who his sole motivation for enduring his imprisonment. He gets visited by an orphanage member notifying him that Meg is about to be adopted. Out of his fear of never seeing her again, his new friends create a diversion for Joe to escape with Turtle accompanying him. On the way there, they run into the police, and Turtle keeps them occupied giving Joe enough time to escape them. When the boys meet Turtle back at school, he reveals his past family life when asked why he helped Joe. His father was a frequent drunk who beat his mother. He ran away from his home only to return and find it destroyed in the Hiroshima bombings. Joe manages to reach the orphanage undetected by the police. He confronts the orphanage member who had notified him of Meg's adoption and demands to see his sister. The orphanage member reveals that she had been anticipating his return as police officers rush in and capture Joe. Upset that he might not be able to see Meg, Joe reveals that the orphanage member had sexually assaulted him and that he is afraid that Meg's adoptive parents will do the same to her. Enraged, the orphanage member hits him over the head with a vase and pulls a knife on him. She stops her attack when Meg enters the room and tells Joe to go back to the reform school. Meg says that they were abandoned and have no choice but to be used. Joe is dragged back to the school while Meg prepares to leave with her adoptive father. Joe returns to his friends who are disappointed that they didn't succeed, but Sakuragi cheers the group up again. At this point, the rest of the boys refer to Sakuragi as "Anchan" (bro). Shortly after Joe's return, Ishihara, (the school's sadistic school guard) beats Joe and Turtle for escaping, then starts a rumor that Sakuragi is in school for murdering his own father. We see a flashback into Scam's childhood where his mother had to work as a prostitute in order to feed her and her son, leading to Scam developing a difficulty in trusting people. Scam is then caught smoking in the library by Ishihara, and throws one of his lit cigarettes out the window in hopes he won't be found out. Ishihara offers Scam the option to blame this on Sakuragi, and Scam agrees. Right after, the cigarette that he threw caused a fire outside that quickly spread throughout the building. Sakuragi escapes the fire, (much to Ishihara's surprise) but the rest of the boys are still stuck in the burning building. Still locked in their cell, the 5 other boys struggle to break out with no success, but most of them cling to the hope that Sakuragi will return. We see a quick flashback where Scam sees Ishihara throw the key to the cell out the window and into a patch of grass. Sakuragi runs into the burning building to rescue the five boys while Scam questions in tears if relying solely on oneself really does work out best for him.
02	July 5, 2003	4-09-153032-X
Crime 10. Judgement Day; Crime 11. Kill the King; Crime 12. Light into the Darkness; Crime 13. Murderer; Crime 14. Nothing to Say; Crime 15. On and On; Crime 16. Pride; Crime 17. Questions; Crime 18. Renegade; Crime 19. Spirit Never Dies; Crime 20. The Mourning After
Sakuragi makes it to the cell through the fire but is unable to break them out. He struggles against the doorknob despite it being locked until the roof caves in. Ishihara finds the key to the cell buried among the grass. Scam begs Ishihara to give him the key, proclaiming they are his first real friends. Ishihara proceeds to hit him with his guard stick. After Sakuragi breaks free from the roof's rubble above him, he turns to see Scam holding the key to the cell, which he managed to take from Ishihara by force. Scam unlocks the cell and the boys proceed to help Sakuragi escape from another large piece of the ceiling. Ishihara is visibly happy that the building is burning down with Sakuragi in it, but is shocked to see all seven boys make it out alive. When he greets Sakuragi, feigning friendliness, Sakuragi punches him in the face. Sakuragi later wakes up in the hospital with several broken bones and many burns. He immediately asks where the others are upon waking up. All of the boys offer to give blood in order to save him. Scam is about to apologize for accidentally starting the fire with his cigarette before Sakuragi interrupts him; saying he saved them and that's all that mattered. Sakuragi talks with his nurse about how his friends saved him and confesses to killing his own father. We see a flashback to Sakuragi's family life, as he lives alone with his mother while the rest of his family fought or died in the war. When his father returned from 4 years of imprisonment in Siberia, he spiralled into alcoholism. Sakuragi returns one afternoon of boxing to help bring him back home from the pub. His father is appalled that he would take up an american sport and attempts to hit Sakuragi. Sakuragi tells his father if he returned just to show how pathetic he became, it wasn't worth the trip. His father's last words to him were "Make sure you listen to your mother" as he walked away. The morning after, his body was found dead in a ditch. Sakuragi believes his own words pushed his father to commit suicide and regrets not trying to understand him better. The rest of the boys leave after overhearing the story and find comfort that Sakuragi will be released shortly after he's done in the hospital. Sakuragi is eager to go back from the hospital to see his friends again, even if he hasn't fully recovered. We see a flashback of cabbage with his longtime girlfriend, Mitsu, when he gets attacked by a man who claims that she's his. Cabbage fought back by hitting him with a manhole cover, resulting in his imprisonment. Mitsu arrives at the reform school to sing for the boyd' entertainment. She and Scam wave at each other after she performs. Cabbage and Soldier go to visit Mitsu and when Soldier asks about Cabbage, she that "He thinks I'm his girlfriend... stupid, right?" When Cabbage sees her again, he finds her kissing another man. She tells Cabbage that she never saw them as an item. Soldier attacks the man she was with, but Cabbage stops him and compliments Mitsu on her singing. Before she has to leave, Cabbage tells Mitsu that he loves her before getting dragged back into the cell. Sakuragi returns to the cell and greets his friends again, with one more month until his release. Ishihara however, vows that he won't live that long. Sakuragi inspires Mario to take up boxing. Soldier plans on joining the military. Scam has aspirations to get rich. Ishihara and Sasaki discuss that both of them will be screwed if Sakuragi talks, but they have a plan to stop him. All of the boys decide to carve their dreams on a tree. Once everyone else is finished writing theirs, Mario carves his wish that everyone else's dreams come true. Once they return, Ishihara tells Sakuragi that he's getting transferred to a different cell with tougher, more hardened criminals. Kumogai, one of the kinder guards, starts questioning Ishihara's intentions, but gets hit by him as a result. Sakuragi appears to have befriended the other criminals at first, but later in the night they proceed to beat him due to a bribe from Ishihara. No matter how much they hit him, he always has a bold smile on his face. Mario asks them why Sakuragi isn't showing up to lunch until they confess to beating him at night. Sakuragi survives off of the leftovers that his beaters throw at him after lunch. He refuses to fight back to avoid being sent to the isolation rooms. Mario goes to them to apologize for hitting one of them and offers to take some beating in place of Sakuragi. They break Mario's right hand, ruining his chances to take up boxing in the future. Upon hearing this Sakuragi fights back, willing to take the isolation room rather than having his friends be harmed. Ishihara enters Sakuragi's cell expecting to find him dead, only to find all the other cell members lying bloody and unconscious. When Ishihara asks them about it, they all say that nothing happened and Sakuragi had nothing to do with it. Ishihara leaves frustrated.
03	October 4, 2003	4-09-153033-8
Crime 21. Until We Rise Again; Crime 22. Vertigo; Crime 23. World of Pain; Crime 24. X Offender; Crime 25. Your Turn is Over; Crime 26. Zaephyr Skie's Theme; Crime 27. A Million to One; Crime 28. Black Sheep; Crime 29. Cry For Freedom; Crime 30. Dead or Alive; Crime 31. Enemy Within
04	December 26, 2003	4-09-153034-6
Crime 32. Far Away; Crime 33. Grave Heart; Crime 34. Higher than the Sky; Crime 35. Infinite Keeper; Crime 36. Just A Shadow; Crime 37. Karma; Crime 38. Learning to Fly; Crime 39. Masquerade; Crime 40. Never Say Goodbye; Crime 41. Open Your Life; Crime 42. Please Don't Leave Me
05	April 5, 2004	4-09-153035-4
Crime 43. Queen of Dark Horizons..?; Crime 44. Rain; Crime 45. St. Anger; Crime 46. Tears of Madness; Crime 47. Until the End of Time; Crime 48. Valley of the Damned; Crime 49. When I Will Fly Far; Crime 50. X; Crime 51. Your Glory Won't Last Forever; Crime 52. Z.I.T.O.
06	July 5, 2004	4-09-153036-2
Crime 53. Any Way You Want It; Crime 54. Bring Me To Life; Crime 55. Cleansing; Crime 56. Death Comes Tonight; Crime 57. Eat The Rich; Crime 58. Freedom; Crime 59. Going Under; Crime 60. Hunting High and Low; Crime 61. In The Middle of a Heartbeat; Crime 62. Just A Little Sing
07	October 5, 2004	4-09-153037-0
Crime 63. King of Fools; Crime 64. Lost in the Depths of Me; Crime 65. Miracle; Crime 66. New World Messiah; Crime 67. Open Arms; Crime 68. Power; Crime 69. Quest of a Million Souls; Crime 70. Someday; Crime 71. Someday; Crime 72. The Enemy; Crime 73. Unbreakable
08	December 27, 2004	4-09-153038-9
Crime 74. We Are, We Are Not...; Crime 75. X.Ray; Crime 76. Your Story Too; Crime 77. Zonata; Crime 78. Avalon; Crime 79. Black In Mind; Crime 80. Celestial Dream; Crime 81. Dreamer; Crime 82. Everywhere I Go; Crime 83. Flesh And Blood; Crime 84. Growing On Me
09	April 5, 2005	4-09-153039-7
Crime 85. Here I Go Again; Crime 86. Into Treason; Crime 87. Judas; Crime 88. Kiss of Death; Crime 89. Lost Without You; Crime 90. Misplaced; Crime 91. No Pain For The Dead; Crime 92. Once Again; Crime 93. Price of War; Crime 94. Quest For The Eternal Fame; Crime 95. Reiching the End
10	July 5, 2005	4-09-153040-0
Crime 96. Slave To The Grind...; Crime 97. Time goes by; Crime 98. Until The End; Crime 99. Wings of Tomorrow; Crime 100. XXX; Crime 101. You Give Love a Bad Name; Crime 102. Zombie Ritual; Crime 103. Always and Eternally; Crime 104. Bombshell; Crime 105. Crownless; Crime 106. Dust to Dust
11	November 4, 2005	4-09-153291-8
Crime 107: Empire of the lost; Crime 108: Far beyond the sun; Crime 109: Goin'where the wind blow; Crime 110: Hero; Crime 111: Inside your mind; Crime 112: Journey man; Crime 113: King the warriors; Crime 114: Loud & Raw; Crime 115: Metal messenger; Crime 116: Never surrender; Crime 117: Only your heart can save us
12	February 3, 2006	4-09-151047-7
Crime 118: Playing God; Crime 119: Quicker than the eye; Crime 120: Rising sun; Crime 121: Story of my life; Crime 122: Through the heaven's; Crime 123: United as one; Crime 124: Vengeance; Crime 125: We're not gonna fall; Crime 126: X savior; Crime 127: You betrayer
13	May 2, 2006	4-09-151080-9
Crime 128: Ziggy stardust; Crime 129: A rose in hr hand; Crime 130: Born on judgment day; Crime 131: Corazon of mine; Crime 132: Demons and Angels; Crime 133: Eternal warrior; Crime 134: Fire at will; Crime 135: Gone to the wall; Crime 136: Hold on; Crime 137: Innocent souls; Crime 138: Jaws of death
14	August 4, 2006	4-09-151108-2
Crime 139 Kreator; Crime 140: Land of miracle; Crime 141: Moonlight shadow; Crime 142: Now that you've gone; Crime 143: One foot in hell; Crime 144: Party hard; Crime 145: Quicksand Jesus; Crime 146: Red; Crime 147: Savage; Crime 148: Take me home; Crime 149: United
15	November 2, 2006	4-09-151134-1
Crime 150: Vermillion; Crime 151: Wild world; Crime 152: X.T.C. Riders; Crime 153: Yellow rain; Crime 154: Zion; Crime 155: Are you dead yet; Crime 156: Burning time; Crime 157: Changes; Crime 158: Do you feel good; Crime 159: Execution; Crime 160: Free at last
16	March 5, 2007	978-4-09-151169-0
Crime 161: Gypsy in me; Crime 162: Hell to pay; Crime 163: I'll be there for you; Crime 164: Just push play; Crime 165: Kick the chair; Crime 166: Liar; Crime 167: Masked ball dalliance; Crime 168: No more tears; Crime 169: Out of control; Crime 170: Perfect word; Crime 171: Queen of dreams
17	June 5, 2007	978-4-09-151204-8
Crime 172: Rock bottom; Crime 173: Superheroes; Crime 174: Trigger; Crime 175: Under the ice; Crime 176: Valley of the Kings; Crime 177: White evil; Crime 178: Xerces; Crime 179: You are the fire; Crime 180: Zero signal; Crime 181: Atomic; Crime 182: Bringing back the balls to rock
18	September 5, 2007	978-4-09-151226-0
Crime 183: Countdown to the revolution; Crime 184: Die; Crime 185: Eat you alive; Crime 186: Fight to the end; Crime 187: Good to be bad; Crime 188: Hellfire; Crime 189: I'm not afraid; Crime 190: Just a miracle; Crime 191: Killing time; Crime 192: Lost; Crime 193: Mrs. God
19	December 28, 2007	978-4-09-151257-4
Crime 194: No return; Crime 195: Only for the night; Crime 196: Pain crawles; Crime 197: Quick sensuality; Crime 198: Rocket ride; Crime 199: Show me the answers; Crime 200: Two step behind; Crime 201: Under fire; Crime 202: Viking; Crime 203: Wanna hear to rock; Crime 204: X.X.L
20	May 2, 2008	4-09-151326-3
Crime 205: You are the one; Crime 206: Zoom; Crime 207: A new religion; Crime 208: Break down; Crime 209: Children of the dawn; Crime 210: Drifting; Crime 211: End of all hope; Crime 212: Firestorm; Crime 213: Gate of heaven; Crime 214: Home sweet home; Crime 215: I can
21	December 26, 2009	4-09-151477-4
Crime 216: Just to get high; Crime 217: King hearted light; Crime 218: Last man standing; Crime 219: My immortal; Crime 220: Next go roung; Crime 221: On the hill od dreams; Crime 222: Punk; Crime 223: Quagmire of flash; Crime 224: Revenge
22	February 27, 2010	978-4-09-151493-6
Crime 225: Shining on the sky; Crime 226: The way I am; Crime 227: Ultra mega; Crime 228: Virus; Crime 229: Where I stand; Crime 230: X marks the spot; Crime 231: Your majesty gaia; Crime 232: Zero of the day; Crime 233: Any other day; Crime 234: Born to be wild; Crime 235: Catch the rainbow
