= Shōnen Sunday S =

Japanese manga magazine

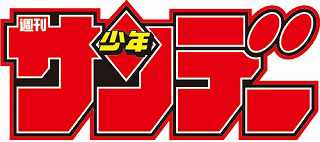

- Cover of the July 2005 issue of Shōnen Sunday Super, with Ryoji Minagawa's D-Live!! supplemental series
- Categories: Shōnen manga
- Frequency: Monthly (1978–2004, 2009–present); Bi-monthly (2004–2009)
- Circulation: 11,667; (July–September 2026)
- First issue: 1978
- Company: Shogakukan
- Country: Japan
- Based in: Tokyo
- Language: Japanese
- Website: Official website

Shōnen Sunday S (Japanese: 週刊少年サンデーS, Hepburn: Shōnen Sandē Esu), formerly known as Shōnen Sunday Super, is a monthly shōnen manga magazine published by Shogakukan in Japan.

== History and background ==
Originally billed as a special edition of Weekly Shōnen Sunday, titled Shōnen Sunday Zōkan (週刊少年サンデー 増刊, Shōnen Sandē Zōkan), it was renamed Shōnen Sunday Super (少年サンデー超, Shōnen Sandē Chō) in 1995. It is often the home of short term serials by established Shogakukan artists, as well as a place to break in new, up-and-coming manga artists. In April 2004 the magazine switched from being published monthly to bi-monthly. In March 2009, it changed back to the monthly basis. In January 2012, the magazine changed its name to simply Shōnen Sunday S.

== Series ==
There are currently 9 manga series being serialized in Shōnen Sunday S.

Series title	Author	Premiered
Adachi Tsutomu Monogatari: Adachi Mitsuru wo Mangaka ni Shita Otoko (あだち勉物語～あだち充を漫画家にした男～)	Takeshi Arima; Mitsuru Adachi (collaboration)	October 2020
Detective Conan: The Culprit Hanzawa (名探偵コナン 犯人の犯沢さん, Meitantei Konan Hannin no Hanzawa-san)	Mayuko Kanba; Gosho Aoyama (original)	May 2017
Kanakana (カナカナ)	Hiroyuki Nishimori	June 2020
King Golf	Ken Sasaki	January 2012
Lisa no Taberarenai Shokutaku (リサの食べられない食卓, Risa no Taberarenai Shokutaku)	Hotori Kurosato	December 2018
Mobile Suit Gundam Aggressor (機動戦士ガンダム アグレッサー, Kidō Senshi Gandamu Aguressā)	Daichi Banjō; Hajime Yatate, Yoshiyuki Tomino (original)	October 2014
Neko to Watashi to Deutschland (ねこと私とドイッチュラント, Neko to Watashi to Doitchuranto)	Ryōko Nagara	January 2018
Soara and the House of Monsters (ソアラと魔物の家, Soara to Mamono no Ie)	Hidenori Yamaji	November 2021
Uruha no Sekai de Arisugawa (麗の世界で有栖川)	Nobuyuki Anzai	February 2018

== Past series ==
=== 1978–1989 ===
- Phantom Burai (ファントム無頼, Fantomu Burai) – Buronson (story) and Kaoru Shintani (art) (1978–1984)
- Nine (ナイン, Nain) – Mitsuru Adachi (1978–1980)
- Chance (チャンス, Chansu) – Kei Satomi (1981–1985)
- Justy (ジャスティ, Jasuti) – Tsuguo Okazaki (1981–1984)
- Kaze no Senshi Dan (風の戦士ダ) – Tetsu Kariya (story) and Kazuhiko Shimamoto (art) (1982–1986)
- Saraba Jinrui (さらば人類) – Noboru Rokuda (1982)
- Takeru (タケル) – Osamu Ishiwata (1983–1984)
- Night (ナイト, Naito) – Mitsuo Hashimoto (1983–1984)
- Kenritsu Chikyū Bōei Gun (県立地球防衛軍) – Kōichirō Yasunaga (1983–1985)
- Striker Retsuden (ストライカー列伝, Sutoraikā Retsuden) – Takeshi Miya (1984–1985)
- Mermaid Saga (人魚シリーズ, Ningyo Shirīzu) – Rumiko Takahashi (1984–1985) (infrequently published in Weekly Shōnen Sunday)
- Birdy the Mighty (鉄腕バーディー, Tetsuwan Bādī) – Yuki Masami (1985–1988) (re-launched in Weekly Young Sunday in 2002)
- Maboroshi Ugen (まぼろし佑幻) – Katsu Aki (1985–1987)
- Caravan Kidd (キャラバン・キッド, Kyaraban Kiddo) – Johji Manabe (1986–1989)
- Yagami-kun no Katei no Jijō (八神くんの家庭の事情) – Kei Kusunoki (1986–1990)
- Magic Kaito (まじっく快斗, Majikku Kaito) – Gosho Aoyama (1987–1988) (infrequently published in Weekly Shōnen Sunday)
- Seventeen Cop (セブンティーン・コップ, Sebuntīn Koppu) – Toshiyuki Tanabe (story) and Yu Nakahara (art) (1988)
- Kyō Kara Ore Wa!! (今日から俺は!!) – Hiroyuki Nishimori (moved to Weekly Shōnen Sunday) (1988–1990)
- Kenta Yarimasu! (健太やります) – Takuya Mitsuda (moved to Weekly Shōnen Sunday) (1988–1989)
- Seishun Tiebreak! (青春タイブレーク!, Seishun Taiburēku!) – Harumi Matsuzaki (1989–1990)
- Kōjirō (光路郎) – Kenichi Muraeda (1989–1993)

=== 1990–2003 ===
- Yūgen Gaisha Shīna Hyakkaten ((有) 椎名百貨店) – Takashi Shiina (1990–1991)
- Junk Party (ジャンクパーティ, Janku Pāti) – Johji Manabe (1990)
- Sengoku Kōshien: Kyukenshi Densetsu (戦国甲子園〜九犬士伝説〜) – Kōji Kiriyama (1991) (moved to Weekly Shōnen Sunday)
- Rappa S.S. (乱破S.S.) – Takashi Shiina (1991–1992)
- Yoban Sādo (4番サード) – Gosho Aoyama (1991–1993)
- Ogre Slayer (鬼切丸) – Kei Kusunoki (1992–2001)
- Kaitei Jinrui Anchovy (海底人類アンチョビー, Kaitei Jinrui Anchobī) – Kōichirō Yasunaga (1992–1994)
- Spriggan (スプリガン, Supurigan) – Hiroshi Takashige (story) and Ryoji Minagawa (art) (moved from Weekly Shōnen Sunday) (1992–1996)
- Byakuren no Fang (白蓮のファング, Byakuren no Fangu) – Yoshihiro Takahashi (1993–1995)
- Super Street Fighter II: Cammy Gaiden (スーパーストリートファイターII キャミィ外伝, Sūpā Sutorīto Faitā II Kyamyi-gaiden) – Masahiko Nakahira (1994)
- Samurai Spirits: Makai Bugeichō (サムライスピリッツ －魔界武芸帖－, Samurai Supirittsu Makai Bugeichō) - Kyōichi Nanatsuki (story) and Yūki Miyoshi (art) (1994)
- Sodatte Darling!! (育ってダーリン!!, Sodatte Dārin!!) – Kōji Kumeta (1994–2002)
- Tennen Senshi G (天然戦士G) – Naoya Matsumori (1996–1998)
- Meibutsu!! Utsuke Mono Honpo (名物!!うつけモノ本舗) – Pero Sugimoto (1996–1999)
- Salad Days – Shinobu Inokuma (1997–1998) (moved to Weekly Shōnen Sunday)
- Wind Mill (ウインドミル, Uindo Miru) – Takashi Hashiguchi (1997–2001)
- Dolphin Brain (ドルフィン・ブレイン, Dorufin Burein) – Reiji Yamada (1997) (moved from Weekly Shōnen Sunday)
- Ten Man (天MAN) – Mondo Takimura (1998)
- Southern Cross (南十字星, Sazan Kurosu) – Michiteru Kusaba (1999)
- New Town Heroes (ニュータウン・ヒーローズ, Nyū Taun Hīrōzu) – Makoto Raiku (1999–2000)
- Tatakae! Ryōzanpaku Shijō Saikyō no Deshi (戦え!梁山泊 史上最強の弟子) – Syun Matsuena (1999–2002)
- Chō Ikusei Shinwa Pagunasu (超育成神話パグナス) – Ryō Ōkuma (2000–2001)
- Heat Wave – Kazurou Inoue (2001)
- Girls Saurus (ガールズザウルス, Gāruzu Zaurusu) – Kei Kusunoki (2001–2002)
- Shigeshida ☆ Shokun!! (茂志田★諸君!!) – Taishi Mori (2001–2002)
- Break Through!: Niji no Petal (BREAK THROUGH!〜虹のペダル〜) – Yōhei Suginobu (2002)
- Kowashiya Gamon (こわしや我聞) – Shun Fujiki (2003) (moved to Weekly Shōnen Sunday)
- Peace Maker – Shūichirō Satō (2003–2004)

=== 2009–2019 ===
- Takkoku!!! (タッコク!!!) – Tsubasa Fukuchi (2009–2011)
- Akira (阿鬼羅) – Shirō Otsuka (2009–2011)
- Mahō Gyōshōnin Roma (魔法行商人ロマ) – Toshihiko Kurazono (2009–2011)
- Mirai no Football (未来のフットボール, Mirai no Futtobōru) – Eko Yamatoya (2009)
- Chōdokyū Shōjo 4946 (超弩級少女4946) – Takeshi Azuma (2009–2011)
- Ping Pong Rush – Aiko Koyama (2009–2010)
- Undead – Masashi Terajima (2009–2010)
- Samurai High School (サムライハイスクール, Samurai Hai Sukūru) – Hiro Kashiwaba (2009–2011)
- Shōgaku ni Nyansei (小学ににゃんせい) – Fujiminosuke Yorozuya (2009–2013)
- Mushibugyō (ムシブギョー) – Hiroshi Fukuda (2009–2010)
- Mahō no Iroha! (魔法のいろは!) – Kazurou Inoue (2009–2011)
- Alice in Borderland (今際の国のアリス, Imawa no Kuni no Arisu) – Haro Aso (2010–2015) (moved to Weekly Shōnen Sunday)
- Mobile Suit Gundam AGE: Memories of SID (機動戦士ガンダムAGE 〜追憶のシド〜, Kidō Senshi Gandamu AGE Tsuioku no Shido) – Hiroshi Nakanishi (art), Hajime Yatate, Yoshiyuki Tomino (original) (2012)
- Aura: Maryūinkōga Saigo no Tatakai (AURA ～魔竜院光牙最後の闘い～) – Romeo Tanaka (original story) and Kōichirō Hoshino (art) (2012–2013)
- Nozo × Kimi (ノゾ×キミ) – Wakō Honna (2012–2014) (moved to Weekly Shōnen Sunday)
- Yugami-kun ni wa Tomodachi ga Inai (湯神くんには友達がいない) – Jun Sakura (2012–2013) (moved to Weekly Shōnen Sunday)
- The Unlimited: Hyōbu Kyōsuke (THE UNLIMITED 兵部京介) – Rokurō Ōgaki (2013–2015)
- Sasami-san@Ganbaranai (ささみさん@がんばらない) – Akira (original story) and Akira Nishikawa (art) (2013) (moved from Weekly Shōnen Sunday)
- Toaru Hikūshi e no Koiuta (とある飛空士への恋歌) – Koroku Inumura (original story) and Takeshi Kojima (art) (2014–2015)
- Amano Megumi wa Sukidarake! (天野めぐみはスキだらけ!) – Nekoguchi (2015) (moved to Weekly Shōnen Sunday)
- Bestiarius (闘獣士 ベスティアリウス, Tōjūshi Besutiariusu) – Masasumi Kakizaki (2015–2018) (moved from Weekly Shōnen Sunday)
- Cat + Crazy (ねこったけ!, Nekottake!) by Wataru Nadatani (2015–2018)
- Bokutachi Tsukiattemasu...? (ぼくたちつきあってます…?) – Tenya (2015–2021)
- Shin Chiisai Hito: Aoba Jidō Sōdanjo Monogatari (新・ちいさいひと 青葉児童相談所物語) – Mitsuhiro Mizuno (story) and Jin Kyouchikutō (art) (2016–2023)
- Outrage Girl Shiomi (指定暴力少女 しおみちゃん, Shitei Bōryoku Shōjo Shiomi-chan) – Kazurou Inoue (2016–2018)
- Snack World (スナックワールド, Sunakku Wārudo) – Level-5 (original) and sho.t (2017–2018)
- Cat + Gamer (猫暮らしのゲーマーさん, Nekogurashi no Gēmā-san) by (2018–2022)
- Kyō Kara Ore Wa!!: Yūsha Sagawa to Ano Futari-hen (今日から俺は!!～勇者サガワとあの二人編～) by Hiroyuki Nishimori (2018–2019)
- Seiso na Furi wo Shitemasu ga (清楚なフリをしてますが) – Chihiro Kurachi (2019–2021)

=== 2020–present ===
- Detective Conan: The Fist of Blue Sapphire (名探偵コナン 紺青の拳, Meitantei Konan Konjō no Fisuto) – Yutaka Abe (story) and Jirō Maruden (art) (2020–2021)
- Fuzoroi Bokura wa Uso wo Tsuku (ふぞろい僕らは嘘をつく。) by Yuki Shoyo (2020–2021)
- 100 Ghost Stories That Will Lead to My Own Death (僕が死ぬだけの百物語, Boku ga Shinu Dake no Hyaku Monogatari) by Anji Matono (2020–2025)
- Aidoru no Kakeibo (アイドルの家計簿) by Takao Aoyagi (2021–2022)
- Detective Conan: Quarter of Silence (名探偵コナン 沈黙の15分, Meitantei Konan Chinmoku no Kwōtā) by Yutaka Abe and Jirō Maruden (art) (2021–2022)
- Yashahime: Princess Half-Demon (～異伝・絵本草子～半妖の夜叉姫, Iden Ehon Sōshi Han'yō no Yashahime) by Takashi Shiina (2021–2025)
