= Sasami-san@Ganbaranai =

Japanese light novel series by Akira and Hidari and its adaptations

- Light novel volume 1 cover, featuring Sasami Tsukuyomi

ささみさん@がんばらない
- Genre: Romantic comedy; Supernatural
- Light novel
- Written by: Akira
- Illustrated by: Hidari
- Published by: Shogakukan
- Imprint: Gagaga Bunko
- Original run: December 18, 2009 – June 28, 2013
- Volumes: 11
- Manga
- Written by: Akira
- Illustrated by: Akira Nishikawa
- Published by: Shogakukan
- Imprint: Shōnen Sunday Comics Special
- Magazine: Weekly Shōnen Sunday; (October 17, 2012 – May 8, 2013); Shōnen Sunday S; (June 25 – September 24, 2013)
- Original run: October 17, 2012 – September 24, 2013
- Volumes: 4
- Anime television series
- Directed by: Akiyuki Shinbo; Naoyuki Tatsuwa (Note: Assistant Director (副監督). See the Shaft directors credit legend.)
- Produced by: Junichirō Tanaka (TBS); Katsumi Koike (Lantis); Kozue Kaneniwa (Movic); Kazuki Adachi (Aniplex); Yoshiaki Uraki (BS-TBS); Miku Ōshima (Shaft)
- Written by: Katsuhiko Takayama
- Music by: Yukari Hashimoto
- Studio: Shaft
- Licensed by: NA: Sentai Filmworks; UK: MVM Films
- Original network: TBS, SUN-TV, CBC, BS-TBS, AT-X
- English network: NA: Anime Network
- Original run: January 11, 2013 – March 29, 2013
- Episodes: 12
- icon

Sasami-san@Ganbaranai (ささみさん@がんばらない; lit. 'Ms. Sasami@Unmotivated') is a Japanese light novel series written by Akira, with illustrations by Hidari. Shogakukan published 11 volumes from December 2009 to June 2013. A manga adaptation illustrated by Akira Nishikawa was serialized in Shogakukan's Weekly Shōnen Sunday from October 2012 to May 2013, and later in Shōnen Sunday S from June to September 2013. Its chapters were collected in four tankōbon volumes. A 12-episode anime television series adaptation by Shaft aired from January to March 2013.

== Plot ==
Sasami Tsukuyomi is a high school shut-in who often stays at home and is doted upon by her older brother, Kamiomi. However, due to unknowingly possessing a god's power, Kamiomi's habit of trying to appease Sasami often puts the world into chaos, while the three Yagami sisters try to put a stop to it.

== Characters ==
Sasami Tsukuyomi (月読 鎖々美, Tsukuyomi Sasami)
Voiced by: Kana Asumi
Sasami is a first-year high school student who lives with her older brother Kamiomi. She is a hikikomori (shut-in) and initially refuses to even go to school, but she later begins attending school in February near the end of her first year in high school. At home, Sasami uses a "Brother Surveillance Tool" on her computer to view the outside world. She possesses the power of Amaterasu, unconsciously causing powerful gods to protect her and her brother. For a while, she believed that the power of Amaterasu was transferred to her brother, just to find later that she never lost it at all.
Kamiomi Tsukuyomi (月読 神臣, Tsukuyomi Kamiomi)
Voiced by: Hōchū Ōtsuka
Kamiomi is Sasami's older brother and is a teacher at her high school. His face is never shown as he is always hiding it with something, such as his briefcase. He has an intense love for his sister and dotes on her constantly as the men of the Tsukuyomi family are conditioned to serve, protect and eventually marry their sisters to keep the power of Amaterasu under the clan's possession.
Tsurugi Yagami (邪神 つるぎ, Yagami Tsurugi)
Voiced by: Chiwa Saito
Tsurugi is 31 years old, the eldest of the Yagami sisters, and is a teacher at Sasami's high school. Despite her age, she has the appearance of a little girl and has the personality of a middle-aged man. She often plays adult games in the staff room. Her name is based on Kusanagi no Tsurugi. Later it is revealed that she is Amaterasu herself, who became fed up of her power and passed it on to Sasami's distant ancestor.
Kagami Yagami (邪神 かがみ, Yagami Kagami)
Voiced by: Kana Hanazawa
Kagami is 16 years old, the second eldest of the Yagami sisters, and is Sasami's classmate. She is a plain girl and is constantly sleepy. She is a cyborg created from a part of Amaterasu who has a vast arsenal of magic and high-tech weapons hidden all over her body. Her name is based on Yata no Kagami.
Tama Yagami (邪神 たま, Yagami Tama)
Voiced by: Ai Nonaka
Tama is nine years old, the youngest of the Yagami sisters, and is in third grade. In contrast of Tsurugi, despite Tama's young age, she has the appearance of an adult woman. However, she has the innocent personality of a girl her age or even younger. Her name is based on Yasakani no Magatama. Tama was created by Tsurugi to be the next vessel of Amaterasu's power after Sasami.
Juju Tsukuyomi (月読 呪々, Tsukuyomi Juju)
Voiced by: Yū Asakawa
Juju is the mother of Sasami and Kamiomi. She possessed the power of Amaterasu before Sasami. She wears Shinto attire, and is often seen with a khakkhara.

== Media ==
=== Light novels ===
Sasami-san@Ganbaranai began as a light novel series written by Akira, with illustrations drawn by Hidari. Shogakukan published 11 volumes of the series under their Gagaga Bunko imprint from December 18, 2009, to June 28, 2013.

=== Manga ===
A manga adaptation illustrated by Akira Nishikawa was serialized in Shogakukan's Weekly Shōnen Sunday magazine from October 17, 2012, to May 8, 2013. It was subsequently transferred to Shōnen Sunday S, and serialized from June 25 to September 24, 2013. Four tankōbon volumes were released from December 18, 2012, to December 18, 2013.

=== Anime ===
A 12-episode anime television series adaptation, produced by Shaft and directed by Akiyuki Shinbo, aired from January 11 to March 29, 2013, on TBS and BS-TBS. Naoyuki Tatsuwa acted as assistant director, Katsuhiko Takayama wrote the series composition, and Yukari Hashimoto composed the series' music. Hiroki Harada designed the characters and acted as chief animation director alongside Takahiro Sasaki and Haruka Tanaka. The opening theme is "Alteration" by Zaq, and the ending theme is "Shintōatsu Symphony" (浸透圧シンフォニー, Shintōatsu Shinfonī; Osmotic Pressure Symphony) by Kana Asumi. Sentai Filmworks licensed the series for North American digital and home video release and began streaming the series on Anime Network in January 2013.

==== Episodes ====
| No. | Title | Directed by (Note: Information is taken from the ending credits of each episode.) | Storyboarded by | Original release date |
|---|---|---|---|---|
| 1 | "I'll Do My Best Starting Tomorrow" "Ashita Kara Ganbaru" (明日からがんばる) | Naoyuki Tatsuwa | Naoyuki Tatsuwa | January 11, 2013 |
On Valentine's Day, Sasami Tsukuyomi, an unmotivated shut-in, attempts to give Valentine's chocolate to her doting brother, Kamiomi. However, having dedicated so many days to Sasami, Kamiomi is unaware of Valentine's and ends up giving his chocolate away, frustrating Sasami as she views him via a surveillance system. Sasami makes various attempts to go after him, but is thwarted by the summer heat. When he eventually learns of Valentine's Day from the three Yagami sisters, Tsurugi, Kagami and Tama, he becomes determined to buy Sasami some chocolate. Things soon take a turn for the weird when the entire world starts turning into chocolate as the result of some powerful gods that the Yagami sisters, who possess unique abilities and skills, fight against. After the gods are defeated, Sasami is left frustrated after having been encased in chocolate.
| 2 | "Home Security Officer" "Jitaku Keibiin" (自宅警備員) | Chika Nagaoka | Naoyuki Tatsuwa; Yasutoshi Iwasaki | January 18, 2013 |
Sasami writes up a report explaining that the chocolate incident was the result of powerful gods appeasing to the wishes of Kamiomi, who unknowingly possesses the powers of the goddess Amaterasu. Meanwhile, many students are absent from school due to becoming engrossed in a fantasy social game. Intrigued by it, Kamiomi and the Yagami sisters borrow Sasami's spare computers to try it for themselves. Sasami, not wanting them to find something wrong with the game and shut it down, preventing her from playing it anymore, tries to interfere with their gaming to no avail and she inevitably reveals herself as a player while attempting to stop their tomfoolery. When a strange dark dragon suddenly appears, absorbing the spirits of all the players, everyone's minds end up getting sucked inside the game itself. The dragon is revealed to be something Sasami created three years ago when she once possessed the power of Amaterasu, which kept the game from being shut down. Coming to understand this, Sasami relieves the dragon of its duty, shutting down the game and returning everyone to the real world.
| 3 | "If I Work, I Lose" "Hataraitara Make" (働いたら負け) | Takashi Kawabata | Takashi Kawabata | January 25, 2013 |
In her report, Sasami explains how she was trained at the Tsukuyomi Shrine to inherit Amaterasu's power, which had been passed down from her family through incestuous means. She soon began to question her life after discovering the internet, eventually deciding to run away with Kamiomi. As she writes her report, Sasami discovers that a third arm has grown out of her chest, soon discovering it has a personality of its own, which tells her Kamiomi plans to return to the shrine in order to protect her from hunters who want Amaterasu's power. Struggling against the sunlight, Sasami comes across Tsurugi, who brings her to Tsukuyomi Shrine and reveals herself to be Amaterasu herself, who gave her power to Sasami's ancestors long ago. As Tama and Kagami arrive to attack the shrine, Tsurugi explains how she created them from parts of herself. Sasami soon learns that Kamiomi had been kicked out of the shrine as he had no divinity, realising she still had the power of Amaterasu all along, with the Gods granting Kamiomi's wishes as part of Sasami's wish to make him happy. Free of her afflictions from the sun, allegedly due to an evil god, Sasami begins attending classes.
| 4 | "Parasite in the House" "Jikka ni Kisei" (実家に寄生) | Shunsuke Ishikawa | Tomoya Takahashi | February 1, 2013 |
Sasami discovers a DVD containing a project by Kamiomi and the Yagami sisters involving them filming her in secret to record her progress. Putting the somewhat perverted nature of the DVD aside, Sasami can't recall doing any of the actions displayed in the video. As Sasami in the video winds up at a mini live concert, it turns out to be a trap set up by the Tsukuyomi Shrine, in which Sasami's father stabs her third arm and allegedly steals her power of Amaterasu. The video soon reaches its climax involving an all out battle between the shrine, the Yagami sisters and government forces trying to obtain an alien Tama came across. Tsurugi then explains that the DVD was made to explain things to Sasami, who is actually revealed to be the third arm, a sarcoma, who lost her memories and assumed she was Sasami and took her form. Sarcoma objects to being forced to return to Sasami's body, but Tsurugi takes away her power before she can object. Tsurugi returns Amaterasu's power to Sasami whilst also turning the sarcoma into a rabbit for Kagami to keep.
| 5 | "You Think I'm Taking This Seriously?" "Mada Honki Dashitenaishi" (まだ本気出してないし) | Naoyuki Tatsuwa | Masahiro Sekino | February 8, 2013 |
Feeling a bit isolated in school, Sasami gets Kagami to be friends with her in order to attract more friends. However, Kagami doesn't seem particularly interested since most of Sasami's suggested activities are unnecessary for her as a robot. Later that night, Sasami finds Kagami in a bloodied state, though she still refuses to be open with her. She becomes upset when she sees Kagami seemingly making some other friends, but cheers up after spending some time playing with Tama, who assures her that Kagami appreciates her friendship. Sasami soon comes to realise that the Myriad Gods are attacking Kagami out of jealousy for being chosen by Sasami to be her friend. After catching up to Kagami, who has just finished destroying all the gods inhabiting the school, she learns that the girls she saw Kagami hang out were actually possessed by gods, and Kagami only went with them to purify them. Sasami apologises and asks Kagami to become her earnest friend, which she accepts.
| 6 | "I'm Troubling Only My Parents" "Meiwaku Kaketeru no wa Oya dake" (迷惑かけてるのは親だけ) | Kouta Okuno | Toshimasa Suzuki | February 15, 2013 |
Sasami believes to have seen her mother, Juju, walking through the streets, despite knowing it shouldn't be possible. The next day, Sasami encounters her again and decides to drag her along to go shopping with her. Despite having fun, Sasami inevitably brings up the matter of how Juju could possibly be here as she had already died of an illness. Juju reveals that she negotiated with the king of the underworld following her death to allow her to stay in the mortal world until her corpse rots as she disappointed to hear about Sasami leaving the shrine. Juju attempts to force Sasami back to the shrine to resume her training, believing Sasami to have wasted her life. Tsurugi and the Yagami sisters arrive to fight against Juju, but struggle against the powers the king of the underworld have granted her. Kagami is stabbed whilst Tsurugi is pushed through a gateway to the underworld. Not wanting Tama to get hurt as well, Sasami agrees to go with Juju back to the shrine.
| 7 | "I Forgot How to Speak" "Koe no Dashikata Wasureta" (声の出し方忘れた) | Takashi Kawabata | Takashi Kawabata | February 22, 2013 |
Feeling useless following the previous battle, Tama goes in search for Sasami. Meanwhile, as Sasami refuses to return to being a priestess, Juju drugs her so that she may bear a child, claiming that Kamiomi is dead, when he is really just being held captive elsewhere. Using what little strength she has, Kagami manages to teleport Tsurugi's sword to Kamiomi so he can break free and rescue Sasami. Juju stands in her way, but Tama arrives and manages to use teleportation to break Juju's sword with Tsurugi's. Tama then proceeds to eat parts of Juju before she is dragged back into the underworld by Tsurugi. Later, Tsurugi calls Sasami, telling her to look after the other sisters whilst she deals with matters in the underworld and sending her the stuffed rabbit she picked out with Juju.
| 8 | "Strategic Solitude" "Senryakuteki Kodoku" (戦略的孤独) | Chika Nagaoka | Tomoya Takahashi | March 1, 2013 |
For some reason, Sasami decides to seclude herself in her room over spring break, using her power to create a barrier that seals off her home from the outside world. Feeling this will have implications on the world if it goes on, Kagami, Tama and Kamiomi attempt to break their way inside the barrier, where they are met by Sasami's resistance. After struggling a bit, they are soon joined by Tsurugi, returned from the underworld, who instructs Tama to eat her way into the barrier and bust into Sasami's bedroom. There, they discover the reason for Sasami's seclusion: she had suddenly gotten fat overnight. To explain what happened, Tsurugi shows Sasami the past through the perspective of Juju, learning of a side of her that she never showed to Sasami. Just then, an assassin from the evil society Arahabaki named Tamamo-no-Mae appears with a stone golem, capturing the young Sasami and speaking of changing the future.
| 9 | "It's Not That I Can't Do It" "Dekinain janai" (できないんじゃない) | Shunsuke Ishikawa | Mitsuru Sasaki | March 8, 2013 |
Tamamo-no-Mae reveals she had possessed Sasami when she was young and was awaken when she felt the desire to change the past, using her power to transform the past. As the golem attempts to kill Juju, Sasami's mind is sent to her own body on the day Juju died, where Tsurugi awaits and Juju returns to life due to a spiritual object she put in Sasami's body, which was what was causing her obesity. Deciding the way to stop Tamamo-no-Mae is to eliminate Sasami's feelings of remorse, Tsurugi takes Sasami and Juju to different points in the past to look for clues. Feeling that it isn't right for the Tsukuyomi clan to hold onto a god's power, Sasami decides that Juju should hold onto Amaterasu's power until she grows up, with Juju feeling proud of her conviction. As Tsurugi feels some regret for leaving her power in humanity's hands, Sasami assures her she's done nothing wrong. After overcoming all of their regrets, Juju is able to fight against Tamamo-no-Mae, using the power she received from Sasami to defeat the golem. Back in the present, Juju emerges from Sasami's body, which resumes its normal shape afterwards. Later, Sasami is approached by her school's student council president, Jou Edogawa, who, unbeknownst to Sasami, is part of Arahabaki.
| 10 | "Fighting an Enemy you Cannot See" "Mienai Teki to Tatakatte miru" (見えない敵と戦ってみる) | Kenjirou Okada | Mitsuru Sasaki | March 15, 2013 |
As the second year gets underway, Sasami ends up learning Jou's secret that she sometimes grows a penis on her body. Later, Jou announces a class trip to a shrine, but Sasami ends up catching a fever and is unable to go. Wanting to experience the trip for herself, Sasami uses a spell on Tama to have her assume her form so she can go in her place alongside Kagami and Tsurugi whilst Sasami observes what Tama does. When it comes time for everyone to have a bath, Sasami tries to get Tama to help Jou to avoid the others learning her secret, protecting her from Tsurugi's perverted advances. As Sasami states how she wants to become Jou's friend, she declines, saying she will one day have to kill her.
| 11 | "Romance is Just an Urban Legend" "Ren'ai nante Toshi Densetsu" (恋愛なんて都市伝説) | Takashi Kawabata | Takashi Kawabata | March 22, 2013 |
Deciding that she needs a bath herself, Sasami takes direct control to have a bath with Jou, oblivious to her supposed declarations of rivalry due to planning out a ritual. As Sasami decides to invite Jou to a festival later in the evening, Kagami becomes jealous and runs off. Catching up with her, Sasami assures Kagami that she is her most important friend.
| 12 | "I Won't Try Hard Tomorrow Either" "Ashita mo Ganbaranai" (明日もがんばらない) | Naoyuki Tatsuwa | Toshimasa Suzuki | March 29, 2013 |
With Jou feeling betrayed by Sasami going after Kagami, she begins to put her plan into operation. Tama is captured and Sasami is cut off from the island whilst Kagami faces up against Tamama-no-Mae. Taking a severed arm of an ancient forgotten God Arahabaki into her body, Jou forces Tama to help her with a ritual ripping out her organs as a part of the ritual to summon Kuzuryuu. Jou wants to use Tamama-no-Mae (Nine Tail Fox) power to change history to rewrite history as Kuzuryuu defeats Yamato Court. Tamama-no-Mae attacks Kagami with two swords that killed Kagutsuchi. She then asks Sasami to swear loyalty to them if she wants to live. Sasami buys some time while Kagami enters the golem (she being the God Kagutsuchi leaves the previous body end enters the Golem) and burns up the Tamamo-no-Mae (Nine Tail Fox). Sasami reveals that she was inside Tama all the time along with her whole house because she wanted to go to the trip badly and now since Tamamo-no-Mae has lifted the barrier to contact Sasami thinking she was elsewhere Tsurugi must have gone out and she must have a plan. The multi-head dragon Kuzuryuu emerges out of the mountain (Sasami realizes that in Japanese Mythology, Gods and Mountains were same). Meanwhile Tsurugi (Actual Amatresu) comes with Susano (Lord of the underworld, Amatresu's younger brother) scolding him for not properly closing the entrance to it because of which Kuzuryuu was able to come out. Susano says why disturb him for this small job and swings his sword Ama-no-Habakiri which kills the dragon in single blow splitting the island itself. Sasami and Jou reconcile on the island while the three sisters and Samami's brother are coming on a raft to pick her.

=== Internet radio show ===
An Internet radio show to promote the anime titled Asumi-san@Ganbaranai (あすみさん@がんばらない) began broadcasting on January 15, 2013, and is hosted by Kana Asumi. The show is streamed online every other Tuesday, and is produced by the Japanese Internet radio station Lantis Web Radio.
