= The Tree of Death: Yomotsuhegui =

Japanese manga series

- First tankōbon volume cover

ヨモツヘグイ 死者の国の果実 (Yomotsuhegui: Shisha no Kuni no Kajitsu)
- Genre: Action; Dark fantasy; Supernatural horror
- Manga
- Written by: Masasumi Kakizaki
- Published by: Kodansha
- English publisher: NA: Seven Seas Entertainment
- Magazine: Monthly Young Magazine
- Original run: October 19, 2021 – September 20, 2023
- Volumes: 3
- icon

The Tree of Death: Yomotsuhegui (Japanese: ヨモツヘグイ 死者の国の果実, Hepburn: Yomotsuhegui: Shisha no Kuni no Kajitsu) is a Japanese manga series written and illustrated by Masasumi Kakizaki. It was serialized in Kodansha's seinen manga magazine Monthly Young Magazine from October 2021 to September 2023, with its chapters collected in three tankōbon volumes.

== Publication ==
Written and illustrated by Masasumi Kakizaki, The Tree of Death: Yomotsuhegui was serialized in Kodansha's seinen manga magazine Monthly Young Magazine from October 19, 2021, to September 20, 2023. Kodansha collected its chapters in three tankōbon volumes, released from June 20, 2022, to December 20, 2023.

The manga is licensed in English by Seven Seas Entertainment.

=== Volumes ===
No.	Original release date	Original ISBN	English release date	English ISBN
1	June 20, 2022	978-4-06-528144-4	February 6, 2024	979-8-88843-327-0
2	December 20, 2022	978-4-06-530066-4	June 18, 2024	979-8-88843-652-3
3	December 20, 2023	978-4-06-533653-3	November 12, 2024	979-8-89160-618-0
