= Salad Days (manga) =

Japanese manga series by Shinobu Inokuma

- Cover of the first volume
- Genre: Romance
- Manga
- Written by: Shinobu Inokuma
- Published by: Shogakukan
- Imprint: Shōnen Sunday Comics
- Magazine: Shōnen Sunday Super; (1997–1998); Weekly Shōnen Sunday; (1998–2002)
- Original run: 1997 – 2001
- Volumes: 18
- Manga

Salad Days single cut: Yuki to Futaba
- Written by: Shinobu Inokuma
- Published by: Nihon Bungeisha
- Magazine: Comic Heaven
- Original run: 2016 – 2017
- Volumes: 2

Salad Days (stylized in all caps) is a Japanese manga series written and illustrated by Shinobu Inokuma. It was first serialized in Shogakukan's shōnen manga magazine Shōnen Sunday Super and later in Weekly Shōnen Sunday. The manga is a collection of romance stories in a high school and college setting, covering various aspects of romance and relationships from finding love to dealing with it, and the pain that can come from it. Almost all of the stories are standalone with one exception that becomes a recurring storyline at various points in the last two-thirds of the manga. Characters featured in other stories will often show up in the current story as part of the supporting cast.

== Publication ==
Salad Days is written and illustrated by Shinobu Inokuma. The series was first published in Shogakukan's Shōnen Sunday Super from 1997 to 1998. It was later serialized in Weekly Shōnen Sunday from 1998 to 2001. Shogakukan collected its chapters in eighteen tankōbon volumes, released from May 18, 1998, to February 18, 2002.

In Indonesia, the manga was published by M&C!.

Another series, titled Salad Days single cut: Yuki to Futaba (SALAD DAYS single cut～由喜と二葉～), was serialized in Nihon Bungeisha's Comic Heaven from 2016 to 2017. Two tankōbon volumes were released on November 28, 2016, and November 29, 2017.

=== Volumes ===
No.	Japanese release date	Japanese ISBN
1	May 18, 1998	4-09-125401-2
2	July 18, 1998	4-09-125402-0
3	October 17, 1998	4-09-125403-9
4	March 18, 1999	4-09-125404-7
5	May 18, 1999	4-09-125405-5
6	August 7, 1999	4-09-125406-3
7	December 10, 1999	4-09-125407-1
8	March 18, 2000	4-09-125408-X
9	May 18, 2000	4-09-125409-8
10	July 18, 2000	4-09-125410-1
11	September 18, 2000	4-09-126091-8
12	December 18, 2000	4-09-126092-6
13	February 17, 2001	4-09-126093-4
14	May 18, 2001	4-09-126094-2
15	July 18, 2001	4-09-126095-0
16	September 18, 2001	4-09-126096-9
17	December 18, 2001	4-09-126097-7
18	February 18, 2002	4-09-126098-5
