= Nozo × Kimi =

Japanese manga series and its adaptation

- First tankōbon volume cover, featuring Kimio Suga (left) and Nozomi Komine (right)

ノゾ×キミ
- Genre: Risqué comedy; Romantic comedy
- Manga

Nozomi and Kimio
- Written by: Wakō Honna
- Published by: Shogakukan
- Magazine: Weekly Shōnen Sunday
- Original run: February 16, 2011 – March 2, 2011
- Manga
- Written by: Wakō Honna
- Published by: Shogakukan
- Imprint: Shōnen Sunday Comics
- Magazine: Shōnen Sunday S; (March 25, 2012 – February 25, 2014); Weekly Shōnen Sunday; (May 28, 2014 – April 15, 2015)
- Original run: March 25, 2012 – April 15, 2015
- Volumes: 8
- Original video animation
- Directed by: Masato Jinbo
- Produced by: Ryou Ooyama; Hiro Torimitsu; Tomokazu Iizumi
- Written by: Hideki Shirane
- Music by: Kanou Kawashima
- Studio: Zexcs
- Licensed by: Sentai Filmworks
- Released: August 18, 2014 – April 18, 2015
- Runtime: 23 minutes
- Episodes: 3
- icon

Nozo × Kimi (ノゾ×キミ) is a Japanese manga series written and illustrated by Wakō Honna. It is a spin-off to Honna's other manga series Nozoki Ana. It was serialized in Shogakukan's Shōnen Sunday S from March 2012 to February 2014, followed by a second part, serialized in Weekly Shōnen Sunday from May 2014 to April 2015. Its chapters were collected in eight tankōbon volumes. A three-episode original video animation produced by Zexcs was launched from August 2014 to February 2015.

== Plot ==
Kimio Suga accidentally becomes trapped in the girl's locker room. Nozomi Komine catches him, but keeps quiet and helps hide him until he can go home. Later, Nozomi, who happens to be his neighbor, blackmails him. In exchange for her silence, he must indulge in her secret hobby of nudity. She constantly flashes him from her window, sends him texts of herself undressed, etc. and expects him to do the same. Kimio puts up with this, but they slowly fall in love. Kimio later gets several girls to fall in love with him due to his kindness or misunderstandings, to his exasperation. Several boys and girls fall in love with Nozomi as well

== Characters ==
Kimio Suga (須賀 キミオ, Suga Kimio)
Voiced by: Yūsuke Kobayashi
Nozomi Komine (小嶺 ノゾミ, Komine Nozomi)
Voiced by: Ayaka Suwa
Yūki Makino (牧野 ユウキ, Makino Yūki)
Voiced by: Shizuka Ishigami
Michiru Sonoda (園田 ミチル, Sonoda Michiru)
Voiced by: Maaya Uchida
Mirei Watanuki (綿貫 ミレイ, Watanuki Mirei)
Voiced by: Yū Serizawa

== Media ==
=== Manga ===
Written and illustrated by Wakō Honna, Nozo × Kimi is a spin-off to Honna's other manga Nozoki Ana. A three-chapter series, titled Nozomi and Kimio (ノゾミとキミオ, Nozomi to Kimio), was published in Shogakukan's Weekly Shōnen Sunday from February 16 to March 2, 2011. Nozo × Kimi was serialized in Shogakukan's Shōnen Sunday S from March 25, 2012, to February 25, 2014. It was followed by a second part, Nozo × Kimi: 2-nensei-hen (ノゾ×キミ 2年生編), which was serialized in Weekly Shōnen Sunday from May 28, 2014, to April 15, 2015. Shogakukan collected the chapters in eight tankōbon volumes, released from September 28, 2012, to June 18, 2015.

==== Volumes ====
No.	Japanese release date	Japanese ISBN
1	September 28, 2012	978-4-09-123830-6
2	October 18, 2013	978-4-09-124490-1
3	June 18, 2014	978-4-09-124672-1
4	August 18, 2014; August 12, 2014 (SE)	978-4-09-125075-9; 978-4-09-941834-2 (SE)
5	November 18, 2014; November 14, 2014 (SE)	978-4-09-125369-9; 978-4-09-941841-0 (SE)
6	February 18, 2015; February 16, 2015 (SE)	978-4-09-125597-6; 978-4-09-941847-2 (SE)
7	April 17, 2015	978-4-09-125808-3
8	June 18, 2015	978-4-09-126156-4

=== Original video animation ===
A three–episode original video animation (OVA) adaptation was produced by Zexcs and directed by Masato Jinbo. The first episode was bundled with the special edition of manga's fourth volume, released on August 18, 2014. The second episode was bundled with the special edition of manga's fifth volume, released on November 18, 2014. The third and final episode was bundled with the special edition of manga's sixth volume, released on February 18, 2015.

In May 2021, Sentai Filmworks announced that it had licensed the OVA; it was released on home video on October 19 of that same year.

== See also ==
- Hada Camera, another manga series by the same author
