= Green Blood (manga) =

Japanese manga series

- First volume cover
- Genre: Action; Western
- Manga
- Written by: Masasumi Kakizaki
- Published by: Kodansha
- Imprint: Young Magazine KC
- Magazine: Weekly Young Magazine
- Original run: June 13, 2011 – May 13, 2013
- Volumes: 5
- icon

Green Blood is a Japanese manga series written and illustrated by Masasumi Kakizaki. It was serialized in Kodansha's seinen manga magazine Weekly Young Magazine from June 2011 to May 2013, with its chapters published in five tankōbon volumes.

== Publication ==
Written and illustrated by Masasumi Kakizaki, Green Blood was serialized in Kodansha's seinen manga magazine Weekly Young Magazine from June 13, 2011, to May 13, 2013. Kodansha compiled its chapters in five tankōbon volumes, released from November 4, 2011, to July 5, 2013.

=== Volumes ===
No.	Release date	ISBN
1	November 4, 2011	978-4-06-382103-1
2	February 6, 2012	978-4-06-382137-6
3	June 6, 2012	978-4-06-382185-7
4	January 4, 2013	978-4-06-382250-2
5	July 5, 2013	978-4-06-382321-9
