= Cat + Gamer =

Japanese manga series

- First volume cover

猫暮らしのゲーマーさん (Nekogurashi no Gēmā-san)
- Genre: Comedy, slice of life
- Manga
- Written by: Wataru Nadatani
- Published by: Shogakukan
- English publisher: NA: Dark Horse Comics
- Imprint: Shōnen Sunday Comics Special
- Magazine: Shōnen Sunday S
- Original run: November 24, 2018 – January 25, 2022
- Volumes: 8
- icon

Cat + Gamer (Japanese: 猫暮らしのゲーマーさん, Hepburn: Nekogurashi no Gēmā-san) is a Japanese manga series written and illustrated by Wataru Nadatani. It was serialized in Shogakukan's shōnen manga magazine Shōnen Sunday S from November 2018 to January 2022.

== Plot ==
Riko Kozakura is a 29-year-old office worker who spends all of her free time playing video games. When she takes in a stray kitten that had been found near her office, she tries to adapt to life as a pet owner using concepts from her games.

== Publication ==
Cat + Gamer, written and illustrated by Wataru Nadatani, was serialized in Shogakukan's shōnen manga magazine Shōnen Sunday S from November 24, 2018, to January 25, 2022. Shogakukan collected its chapters in eight tankōbon volumes, released from May 17, 2019, to April 18, 2022.

In July 2021, Dark Horse Comics announced that it had licensed the manga for English release in North America. Translated by Zack Davisson, the first volume was released on March 2, 2022.

=== Volumes ===
No.	Original release date	Original ISBN	English release date	English ISBN
1	May 17, 2019	978-4-09-129228-5	March 2, 2022	978-1-5067-2741-7
2	August 16, 2019	978-4-09-129370-1	August 10, 2022	978-1-5067-2742-4
3	March 18, 2020	978-4-09-850090-1	October 10, 2023	978-1-5067-2743-1
4	July 17, 2020	978-4-09-850166-3	February 28, 2024	978-1-5067-3663-1
5	December 18, 2020	978-4-09-850410-7	June 26, 2024	978-1-5067-3664-8
6	May 18, 2021	978-4-09-850612-5	October 23, 2024	978-1-5067-3665-5
7	January 18, 2022	978-4-09-850881-5	February 26, 2025	978-1-5067-3666-2
8	April 18, 2022	978-4-09-851100-6	August 26, 2025	978-1-5067-4829-0

== Reception ==
In 2022, the series was nominated for a Harvey Award in the Best Manga category; it was nominated for the same category in 2023.

== See also ==
- Cat + Crazy, another manga series by the same author
