= Prefectural Earth Defense Force =

Japanese manga and OVA series

- Cover of volume 1

県立地球防衛軍 (Kenritsu Chikyū Bōei Gun)
- Manga
- Written by: Kōichirō Yasunaga
- Published by: Shogakukan
- Magazine: Shōnen Sunday Zōkan
- Original run: March 25, 1983 – July 25, 1985
- Volumes: 4
- Original video animation
- Directed by: Keiji Hayakawa
- Written by: Kazunori Itō
- Music by: Kentaro Haneda; Masahiru Komatsu
- Studio: Studio Gallop
- Licensed by: NA: ADV Films (2006-2009)
- Released: March 21, 1986
- Runtime: 50 minutes

Prefectural Earth Defense Force (県立地球防衛軍, Kenritsu Chikyū Bōei Gun) is a Japanese manga series by Kōichirō Yasunaga which ran in Shōnen Sunday Zōkan beginning in 1983. The manga was written as a parody gag manga inspired by the tokusatsu series Ultraseven. An anime OVA based on the manga was released in 1986. The anime was released on DVD in North America by ADV Films on April 18, 2006.

== Summary ==
The evil secret society known as the Telephone Pole Gang seeks to take over the world by first taking over a certain prefecture on Kyūshū (they never specify which one). In order to thwart the evil plans of the Telephone Pole Gang, Imazuru High School creates the Prefectural Earth Defense Force, composed of problem teachers and students from the school. They are also joined by a cyborg transfer student from India.

The Telephone Pole Gang is commanded by Chilthonian (full name Kisoya Chilthonian Bunzaemon Jr. (木曽屋チルソニアン文左衛門Jr．, Kisoya Chirusonian Bunzaemon Junia)). His staff includes Ryūko Harataki (原滝龍子, Harataki Ryūko), also known as Colonel Baradagi (バラダギ大佐, Baradagi Taisa), who has taken on the role of a student at Imazuru High School, and Karmi (カーミ, Kāmi), a transfer student from India.

== Manga ==
There are four volumes collecting this story.

Original release

No.	Japanese release date	Japanese ISBN
1	November 1984	4-09-121181-X
2	March 1985	4-09-121182-8
3	July 1985	4-09-121183-6
4	January 1986	4-09-121184-4

Re-release

No.	Japanese release date	Japanese ISBN
1	December 18, 2013	978-4-09-124532-8
2	January 17, 2014	978-4-09-124533-5
3	February 18, 2014	978-4-09-124534-2
4	March 18, 2014	978-4-09-124535-9

== Anime ==
EP album cover for anime soundtrack.

=== Cast ===
- Baradagi: Hiromi Tsuru
- Karmi Santin: Hirotaka Suzuoki
- Takei Sukekubo: Tesshō Genda
- Chilthonian: Shūichi Ikeda
- Hiroaki Morita: Tōru Furuya
- Toshiyuki Roberi: Hideyuki Tanaka
- Miyuki Ōyama: Keiko Han
- Dr. Mafune: Kōji Totani
- Shokutsū: Masaharu Satō
- Dr. Inoue: Kōhei Miyauchi
- Akiko Ifukube: Rika Fukami
- Scope Tsurusaki: Takeshi Aono
- Yūko Inoue: Toshiko Fujita

=== Staff ===
- Original Manga: Kōichirō Yasunaga
- Script: Kazunori Itō
- Character Design: Katsumi Aoshima
- Art Director: Shichirō Kobayashi
- Animation Director: Katsumi Aoshima
- Music: Kentarō Haneda
- Director of Photography: Jurō Sugimura
- Color Coordinators: Atsuko Takahira, Hiromi Fujita
- Sound Director: Masahiru Komatsu
- Director: Keiji Hayakawa
- Animation Production: Studio Gallop
- Produced by Shogakukan
