= Chiisai Hito =

Japanese manga series

- Chiisai Hito: Aoba Jidō Sōdanjo Monogatari
- First tankōbon volume cover

ちいさいひと 青葉児童相談所物語
- Genre: Drama
- Manga
- Written by: Mitsuhiro Mizuno
- Illustrated by: Jin Kyōchikutō
- Published by: Shogakukan
- Imprint: Shōnen Sunday Comics
- Magazine: Weekly Shōnen Sunday (November 2, 2010 – June 20, 2012); Shōnen Sunday S (June 25, 2012 – October 25, 2013)
- Original run: November 2, 2010 – October 25, 2013
- Volumes: 6
- Manga

Shin Chiisai Hito: Aoba Jidō Sōdanjo Monogatari
- Written by: Mitsuhiro Mizuno
- Illustrated by: Jin Kyōchikutō
- Published by: Shogakukan
- Imprint: Shōnen Sunday Comics
- Magazine: Shōnen Sunday S
- Original run: July 25, 2016 – November 24, 2023
- Volumes: 14
- icon

Chiisai Hito: Aoba Jidō Sōdanjo Monogatari (ちいさいひと 青葉児童相談所物語; 'Little People: Aoba Children's Counseling Center Story') is a Japanese manga series written by Mitsuhiro Mizuno and illustrated by Jin Kyōchikutō. It was first serialized in Shogakukan's shōnen manga magazine Weekly Shōnen Sunday from November 2010 to June 2012, and later in Shōnen Sunday S from June 2012 to October 2013, with its chapters collected in six tankōbon volumes. A sequel, Shin Chiisai Hito: Aoba Jidō Sōdanjo Monogatari, was serialized in Shōnen Sunday S from July 2016 to November 2023, with its chapters collected in fourteen tankōbon volumes.

== Publication ==
Written by Mitsuhiro Mizuno and illustrated by Jin Kyōchikutō, with cooperation of Junichi Komiya (a former Saitama Shimbun reporter who had been covering the abuse issue for about 20 years), Chiisai Hito was first serialized in Shogakukan's shōnen manga magazine Weekly Shōnen Sunday from November 2, 2010, to June 20, 2012. It was later serialized in Shōnen Sunday S from June 25, 2012, to October 25, 2013. Shogakukan collected its chapters in six tankōbon volumes, released from November 18, 2011, to November 18, 2013.

A sequel, titled Shin Chiisai Hito: Aoba Jidō Sōdanjo Monogatari (新・ちいさいひと 青葉児童相談所物語), was serialized in Shōnen Sunday S from July 25, 2016, to November 24, 2023. Shogakukan collected its chapters in fourteen tankōbon volumes, released from December 17, 2016, to March 18, 2024.

=== Chiisai Hito ===
No.	Japanese release date	Japanese ISBN
1	November 18, 2011	978-4-09-123449-0
2	April 18, 2012	978-4-09-123655-5
3	October 18, 2012	978-4-09-124002-6
4	January 18, 2013	978-4-09-124173-3
5	August 16, 2013	978-4-09-124369-0
6	November 18, 2013	978-4-09-124496-3

=== Shin Chiisai Hito ===
No.	Japanese release date	Japanese ISBN
1	December 16, 2016	978-4-09-127432-8
2	June 16, 2017	978-4-09-127650-6
3	January 18, 2018	978-4-09-128081-7
4	July 18, 2018	978-4-09-128340-5
5	January 18, 2019	978-4-09-128786-1
6	June 18, 2019	978-4-09-129229-2
7	January 17, 2020	978-4-09-129550-7
8	October 16, 2020	978-4-09-129550-7
9	May 18, 2021	978-4-09-850530-2
10	December 17, 2021	978-4-09-850740-5
11	June 17, 2022	978-4-09-851155-6
12	March 16, 2023	978-4-09-851777-0
13	February 16, 2024	978-4-09-853191-2
14	March 18, 2024	978-4-09-853192-9

== Reception ==
Chiisai Hito was one of the 50 manga titles selected for a manga exhibition about the promotion of human rights, held by the Tokyo Metropolitan Human Rights Promotion Center in 2015. In September 2015, the manga began its electronically distribution on Manga Kingdom and Comic Shogakukan Books, and the number of downloads exceeded 370,000 in about a month, the highest number of electronically distributed works by Shogakukan; part of the sales were donated to the Orange Ribbon Campaign, as part of the Ministry of Health, Labour and Welfare's "Child Abuse Prevention Promotion Month". According to Manga Zenkan, Chiisai Hito was the 17th best-selling manga in 2015.
