= King Golf =

Japanese manga series by Ken Sasaki

- First tankōbon volume cover
- Genre: Sports
- Manga
- Written by: Ken Sasaki
- Published by: Shogakukan
- Imprint: Shōnen Sunday Comics
- Magazine: Weekly Shōnen Sunday; (August 6, 2008 – October 12, 2011); Shōnen Sunday S; (January 25, 2012 – present)
- Original run: August 6, 2008 – present
- Volumes: 44
- icon

King Golf (stylized in all caps) is a Japanese manga series written and illustrated by Ken Sasaki. It was serialized by Shogakukan in the shōnen manga magazine Weekly Shōnen Sunday from August 2008 to October 2011, and later transferred to Shōnen Sunday S in January 2012. Its chapters have been collected into 44 tankōbon volumes as of November 2025. It follows the story of high school student Sōsuke Yūke, as he begins his career in golf and over time obtains many wins and defeats various opponents.

King Golf won the 56th Shogakukan Manga Award for the shōnen category in 2011.

== Story ==
Sōsuke Yūki (優木 蒼甫, Yūki Sōsuke), also known as "Predator", is a talented young delinquent who is skilled at fighting. He has fought nearly everyone in his region to reign supreme. One day, he realizes that people may fear him, but they do not admire him. On that day, a prodigy amateur golfer looks down on the young delinquent. Infuriated, Sōsuke gets involved in the golf world to get revenge. Driven by inspiration, courage, and competitiveness, Sōsuke is fully committed to overcoming every rival and becoming the "king of golf".

== Publication ==
Written and illustrated by Ken Sasaki, King Golf was first published in Shogakukan's Weekly Shōnen Sunday from August 6, 2008, to October 12, 2011. (Note: It started in the magazine's 36th–37th combined issue of 2008 (cover dated August 20), released on August 6 of that same year.) (Note: It finished in the magazine's 46th issue of 2011, released on October 12 of that same year.) It was then transferred to Shōnen Sunday S, where it started on January 25, 2012. Shogakukan has collected its chapters into individual tankōbon volumes. The first volume was published on January 16, 2009. As of March 18, 2026, 44 volumes have been published.

=== Volumes ===
No.	Japanese release date	Japanese ISBN
1	January 16, 2009	978-4-09-121578-9
2	March 18, 2009	978-4-09-121619-9
3	June 18, 2009	978-4-09-122021-9
4	September 17, 2009	978-4-09-121728-8
5	December 18, 2009	978-4-09-122045-5
6	March 18, 2010	978-4-09-122193-3
7	June 18, 2010	978-4-09-122333-3
8	September 17, 2010	978-4-09-122524-5
9	December 17, 2010	978-4-09-122697-6
10	March 18, 2011	978-4-09-122796-6
11	May 18, 2011	978-4-09-122877-2
12	July 15, 2011	978-4-09-123207-6
13	October 18, 2011	978-4-09-123340-0
14	January 18, 2012	978-4-09-123539-8
15	January 18, 2012	978-4-09-123587-9
16	June 18, 2012	978-4-09-123706-4
17	October 18, 2012	978-4-09-123899-3
18	February 18, 2013	978-4-09124186-3
19	June 18, 2013	978-4-09-124318-8
20	October 18, 2013	978-4-09-124475-8
21	February 18, 2014	978-4-09-124566-3
22	June 18, 2014	978-4-09-124668-4
23	October 17, 2014	978-4-09-125309-5
24	March 18, 2015	978-4-09-125600-3
25	August 18, 2015	978-4-09-126195-3
26	November 18, 2015	978-4-09-126490-9
27	April 18, 2016	978-4-09-126824-2
28	September 16, 2016	978-4-09-127338-3
29	February 17, 2017	978-4-09-127503-5
30	August 18, 2017	978-4-09-127577-6
31	December 18, 2017	978-4-09-127881-4
32	May 18, 2018	978-4-09-128251-4
33	November 16, 2018	978-4-09-128588-1
34	May 17, 2019	978-4-09-129165-3
35	November 18, 2019	978-4-09-129447-0
36	July 17, 2020	978-4-09-850168-7
37	December 18, 2020	978-4-09-850283-7
38	September 17, 2021	978-4-09-850645-3
39	May 18, 2022	978-4-09-851130-3
40	January 18, 2023	978-4-09-851536-3
41	June 18, 2024	978-4-09-853382-4
42	September 18, 2024	978-4-09-853579-8
43	November 18, 2025	978-4-09-854334-2
44	March 18, 2026	978-4-09-854492-9

== Reception ==
King Golf won 56th Shogakukan Manga Award in the shōnen manga category in 2011.
