= Hideout (manga) =

Japanese manga series by Masasumi Kakizaki

- Volume cover
- Genre: Psychological horror
- Manga
- Written by: Masasumi Kakizaki
- Published by: Shogakukan
- English publisher: NA: Abrams ComicArts
- Magazine: Weekly Big Comic Spirits
- Original run: June 14, 2010 – August 23, 2010
- Volumes: 1
- icon

Hideout (stylized in all caps) is a Japanese manga series written and illustrated by Masasumi Kakizaki. It was serialized in Shogakukan's seinen manga magazine Weekly Big Comic Spirits in 2010, with its chapters collected in a single tankōbon volume.

== Plot ==
Seichi Kirishima, a former aspiring writer, plans to murder his wife Miki during their vacation on a remote island. Trapped by heavy rainfall in the island's interior, he resolves to commit the act. His life deteriorated rapidly after losing his publishing contract, marking the beginning of his psychological decline. The story unfolds through fragments of what appears to be his final manuscript.

== Characters ==
- Seichi Kirishima: A former writer and the husband of Miki Kirishima. After losing his son, he brought his wife on a vacation on which he planned on murdering her.
- Miki Kirishima: Seichi's wife. She is angry at her husband after their only son's death.
- The Old man: He is deprived of sunlight as he lives inside a dark cave for his life, takes women as prisoners and consumes the flesh of male stragglers.

== Publication ==
Written and illustrated by Masasumi Kakizaki, Hideout was serialized in Shogakukan's seinen manga magazine Weekly Big Comic Spirits from June 14 to August 23, 2010. Shogakukan collected its nine chapters in a single tankōbon volume, released on November 30, 2010.

In February 2026, Abrams ComicArts announced that it had licensed the series for English publication, with the volume set to release on October 13 of the same year.

=== Chapters ===
No.	Release date	ISBN
1	November 30, 2010	978-4-09-183613-7
1. "Wicked Eyes"; 2. "Nightmare"; 3. "Everybody Dies"; 4. "Help Me"; 5. "Reversal"; 6. Buried Alive"; 7. Dead or Alive"; 8. New Family"; 9. Death Spiral"
