= Bestiarius (manga) =

Japanese manga series

- First volume cover, featuring Finn

闘獣士 ベスティアリウス (Tōjūshi Besutiariusu)
- Genre: Heroic fantasy; Historical
- Manga
- Written by: Masasumi Kakizaki
- Published by: Shogakukan
- Imprint: Shōnen Sunday Comics Special
- Magazine: Weekly Shōnen Sunday (2011–2015); Shōnen Sunday S (2015–2018)
- Original run: February 9, 2011 – December 25, 2018
- Volumes: 7
- icon

Bestiarius (Japanese: 闘獣士 ベスティアリウス, Hepburn: Tōjūshi Besutiariusu) is a Japanese manga series written and illustrated by Masasumi Kakizaki. It was serialized in Shogakukan's shōnen manga magazine Weekly Shōnen Sunday from February 2011 to March 2015, and later in Shōnen Sunday S from December 2015 to December 2018. Its chapters were collected in seven tankōbon volumes.

== Plot ==
Set in ancient Rome during the reign of the Roman Empire, the series follows episodic arcs depicting death matches in the Colosseum, centered on the last living wyvern, Durandal, and his relationships with various arena fighters over the years.

The Roman Empire massacres Durandal's homeland and species. Durandal defeats an army, and the last dying soldier asks him to tell his four-year-old son, Fin, that he died with honor. Soon after, another wave of Roman soldiers captures and imprisons Durandal. They try to coerce him into fighting in the Colosseum, but he refuses. While imprisoned, Durandal meets Fin and becomes his surrogate father, training Fin to survive as a gladiator. Fifteen years later, Fin is an undefeated gladiator. The emperor Domitianus arranges a death match between Durandal and Fin, promising freedom to the winner. Durandal provokes Fin by claiming to have killed Fin's father. Fin wounds Durandal in anger but, instead of delivering a killing blow, breaks Durandal's chains and frees him. They escape the arena and fly to Durandal's homeland, where they live peacefully for three years. A large Roman army then attacks, and Fin is mortally slain.

Other arcs take place simultaneously with these events, focusing on different characters imprisoned and forced to fight gladiator matches, with occasional depictions of their relationships and interactions with Durandal and Fin.

== Production ==
Masasumi Kakizaki stated that he always liked Rome from the Roman Empire era and wanted to make a work based on it. Kakizaki said that writing a realistic story of the Roman Empire would not be suited for a shōnen manga magazine, so he added dragons and other mythological creatures to the story to attract the specific audience. To make the creatures, he used an old book with illustrations of monsters and adapted them to his own art style. Kakizaki has been particularly influenced by films to make his works, and stated that Bestiarius is influenced by the 1959 film Ben-Hur.

== Publication ==
Bestiarius, written and illustrated by Masasumi Kakizaki, was first published as two-part one-shot chapter in Shogakukan's shōnen manga magazine Weekly Shōnen Sunday from February 9–16, 2011; a "second episode" ran from August 7 to September 4, 2013; a "third episode" ran from October 22, 2014, to March 4, 2015. the series was later transferred to Shōnen Sunday S, where it ran its last "fourth episode" from December 25, 2015, to December 25, 2018. Shogakukan published its chapters in seven tankōbon volumes, released from December 18, 2013, to February 18, 2019.

=== Volumes ===
| No. | Japanese release date | Japanese ISBN |
|---|---|---|
| 1 | December 18, 2013 | 978-4-09-124541-0 |
| 2 | December 18, 2014 | 978-4-09-125545-7 |
| 3 | May 18, 2015 | 978-4-09-126076-5 |
| 4 | September 16, 2016 | 978-4-09-127400-7 |
| 5 | June 16, 2017 | 978-4-09-127649-0 |
| 6 | April 18, 2018 | 978-4-09-128281-1 |
| 7 | February 18, 2019 | 978-4-09-129088-5 |

== Reception ==
Writing for Le Figaro, Valentin Paquot described Bestiarius as "clever mix between Gladiator and The Lord of the Rings", adding that Kakizaki graphically reinvents mythological creatures, giving them a dark and terrifying appearance of realism. He concluded: "Bestiarius, is in the lineage of Berserk, Lodoss and other titles in the pantheon of Fantasy. A manga to discover absolutely for fans of the genre."
