= Yugami-kun ni wa Tomodachi ga Inai =

Japanese manga series

- First tankōbon volume cover

湯神くんには友達がいない
- Genre: Comedy
- Manga
- Written by: Jun Sakura
- Published by: Shogakukan
- Imprint: Shōnen Sunday Comics
- Magazine: Shōnen Sunday S; (May 25, 2012 – September 25, 2013); Weekly Shōnen Sunday; (October 30, 2013 – May 22, 2019)
- Original run: May 25, 2012 – May 22, 2019
- Volumes: 16
- icon

Yugami-kun ni wa Tomodachi ga Inai (湯神くんには友達がいない; lit. 'Yugami Doesn't Have Any Friends') is a Japanese manga series written and illustrated by Jun Sakura. It was serialized in Shogakukan's Shōnen Sunday S from May 2012 to September 2013, then moved to Weekly Shōnen Sunday, where it was serialized from October 2013 to May 2019. Its chapters were collected in sixteen tankōbon volumes.

== Plot ==
A transfer student at her new high school, Chihiro Watanuki is helped out by a student while finding a place to park her bicycle. After her class introduction concludes, she finds out that her seat is right next to the boy who helped her earlier that day. Her classmates inform her that he is Yuji Yugami, the ace of the Baseball Club. However, they also advise her to stay away from him, as he is known to be a bonafide weirdo and his actions are incomprehensible to most people. Unconvinced, she attempts to interact with him, quickly realizing that he is nothing but a pain to talk to and that the rumors were indeed true.

Shortly afterward, Chihiro gets entangled in a sticky situation with the third-years, but Yuji once again comes to her rescue, albeit for his own self-righteous reasons. Convinced that there is more to him than meets the eye, she is determined to treat him without bias and to live a normal high school life surrounded by friends.

== Characters ==
Yuji Yugami (湯神裕二, Yugami Yūji)
Voiced by: Kōki Uchiyama
The Ace of the Kamihoshi baseball team, he is the first person Chihiro meets when she transfers into Kamihoshi. He tends to do things at his own pace, always marching to the beat of his own drum. He is notoriously known as a troublesome weirdo amongst not only his baseball club teammates, but also his classmates, and this causes him to be isolated by his peers. However, being alone does not faze Yuji at all, and he claims he does not need friends. After all the third-year members retired at the end of summer, he is given the new captain role of the Kamihoshi baseball team even though Yuji himself is uninterested.
Chihiro Watanuki (綿貫ちひろ, Watanuki Chihiro)
Voiced by: Madoka Yonezawa
A transfer student at Kamihoshi who wants to make friends quickly. The first person she meets when she transfers in is Yuji, whom she ends up sitting next to in class. Despite being warned by classmates to not associate with him, Chihiro ends up talking to Yuji often. Although she considers him troublesome to deal with at times, Yuji is also often the one who helps her out when she is troubled.
Haruki Kadota (門田春樹, Kadota Haruki)
Voiced by: Atsushi Abe
A first year regular on the baseball club and Yuji's catcher, who used to play on the same local youth baseball team as Yuji. Despite being a year younger than Yuji, he has spent the longest time with him and the one who knows Yuji's attitude the most.
Rio Fujisawa (藤沢梨緒, Fujisawa Rio)
A friend of Chihiro who used to be in love with Yuji until she knew his real personality. She is a very meticulous person, someone who wants to do a task in a perfect way. Whenever something doesn't go according to her plans, she either stays silent or becomes enraged. Though Rio no longer has any feelings for Yuji, she still continues to support the Baseball club and is willing to help the club whenever it faces trouble, especially before an upcoming tournament.
Yuko Yugami (湯神裕子, Yugami Yūko)
Yuji's little sister. She is a first year middle school student, she often makes snide remarks regarding her older brother.
Masaki Hayashiyama (林山真咲, Hayashiyama Masaki)
A second year student and the baseball club's ace of the Amagi baseball team. He has known Yuji since elementary school and considers him a rival, but the rivalry is completely one-sided on Masaki's part.
Wakana Kuzumi (久住若奈, Kuzumi Wakana)
The baseball club's manager. She is Yuji and Chihiro's classmate. Wakana considers Yuji troublesome and tries her best to ignore him.
Kaori Momose (百瀬香織, Momose Kaori)
Yuji and Chihiro's classmate, along with being part of Kuzumi's group of friends. She hates Yuji with a passion and disliked Chihiro for associating with him and getting close to Kuzumi, She later develops a crush on Yuji.

== Publication ==
Written and illustrated by Jun Sakura, Yugami-kun ni wa Tomodachi ga Inai was serialized in Shogakukan's shōnen manga magazine Shōnen Sunday S from May 25, 2012, to September 25, 2013. It was later serialized in Weekly Shōnen Sunday from October 30, 2013, to May 22, 2019. The series was collected into sixteen tankōbon volumes published by Shogakukan, released from November 16, 2012, to July 18, 2019. Two anime commercials for the manga, animated by A-1 Pictures, were released on November 26, 2013, and September 18, 2014. A drama CD was released along with the sixth volume of the manga.

=== Volumes ===
No.	Release date	ISBN
1	November 16, 2012	978-4-09-124020-0
2	April 18, 2013	978-4-09-124293-8
3	October 18, 2013	978-4-09-124478-9
4	April 18, 2014	978-4-09-124625-7
5	September 18, 2014	978-4-09-125107-7
6	February 18, 2015	978-4-09-125607-2
7	July 17, 2015	978-4-09-126197-7
8	December 18, 2015	978-4-09-126566-1
9	May 18, 2016	978-4-09-127159-4
10	October 18, 2016	978-4-09-127407-6
11	April 18, 2017	978-4-09-127561-5
12	October 18, 2017	978-4-09-127863-0
13	April 18, 2018	978-4-09-128241-5
14	October 18, 2018	978-4-09-128559-1
15	April 18, 2019	978-4-09-129137-0
16	July 18, 2019	978-4-09-129305-3

== Reception ==
Yugami-kun ni wa Tomodachi ga Inai ranked 13th on the "Nationwide Bookstore Employees' Recommended Comics" by the Honya Club website in 2014.
