= Nozoki Ana =

Japanese manga series

- Cover of the first manga volume

ノ・ゾ・キ・ア・ナ (No-Zo-Ki-A-Na)
- Genre: Erotic romance
- Manga
- Written by: Wakou Honna
- Published by: Shogakukan
- Magazine: Moba Man
- Original run: January 23, 2009 – February 1, 2013
- Volumes: 13
- Original video animation
- Directed by: Katsuhiko Nishijima
- Produced by: Mariko Kusuhara; Shunji Sakai
- Written by: Masahiro Ōkubo
- Music by: Miyako Matsuoka; Taketeru Sunamori
- Studio: Studio Fantasia
- Released: February 28, 2013
- Runtime: 43 minutes
- Live-action film
- Directed by: Ataru Ueda; Kensuke Tsukuda
- Released: June 28, 2014
- icon

Nozoki Ana (Japanese: ノ・ゾ・キ・ア・ナ; lit: A Peep Hole) is a Japanese manga series written and illustrated by Honna Wakou about two college students, Tatsuhiko Kido and Emiru Ikuno, who are neighbors in the same apartment complex and are connected by a small "peephole" between their rooms. Nozoki Ana was serialized in Shogakukan's Moba Man mobile phone manga magazine/website from 2009 to 2013, with its chapters collected in thirteen tankōbon volumes.

It was adapted into an original video animation in 2013 and adapted into a live-action film that was released on June 28, 2014. A spin-off manga, Nozo × Kimi, was also released.

== Plot ==
Nozoki Ana follows the life and loves of art student Tatsuhiko Kido. After moving to Tokyo to attend art school, he discovers a hole in the wall of his apartment through which he has a view of the neighboring apartment. When he looks through it he sees his beautiful neighbor, Emiru Ikuno, masturbating. When he goes next door to tell her about the hole, she lets him into the apartment. Unfortunately for him, he trips, falls, and ends up on top of her. Emiru snaps a photo of them in this awkward position and insists that she will only erase the picture if he leaves the hole and allows her to peep on him. But she isn't selfish - he may peep on her too. This begins a life of the two of them "peeping" on each other.

The rest of the story follows Kido through his sexual relationships and his everyday life while he copes with being both peeped on and encouraged to peep on his neighbor. Eventually giving in to temptation, Kido peeps on Emiru witnessing her masturbating and falls into several traps laid by Emiru who records him sucking on her breasts and kissing her. Later in the story Kido, even though Emiru tries to stop him, finds out that his girlfriend, Kotobiki Yuri, is using him to cheat on her other boyfriend who does not care what she does. This prompts Kido to end their relationship. Yuri later tries to make up with Kido and seduce him, saying she wants to be with him rather than her other boyfriend, but is rejected.

The story continues with Kido thinking that Emiru is hiding a different side to her. Kido eventually dates another girl, Madoka Watari, who seems perfect for him. She is initially extremely reluctant to lose her virginity but eventually relents and they start dating. As time passes Kido realizes that he has feelings for Emiru and he breaks up with Madoka. He seeks out Emiru's friend, Saki, who tells him the reason why Emiru has become what she is. Despite this revelation, he continues to love her. They hook up the night before their graduation, but the next day Emiru leaves Kido before the graduation ceremony but he makes one final rule in their peeping game which was to have ended with their graduation: he will wait for her for one year before moving on. A year after graduation he returns from a class reunion to find that she has returned and they finally become the couple they were destined to be.

== Characters ==
Tatsuhiko Kido (城戸 瀧彦, Kido Tatsuhiko)
Voiced by: Daisuke Hirakawa
Portrayed by: Atsumi Kanno
A healthy 18-year-old high school student who moved from a small town to Tokyo in order to attend school. He is a naturally kind person and cares about his friends, but isn’t quick to forget painful incidents. He fears he will hurt others entrapped in his peeping game with Emiru. He would slowly learn more about himself and how he feels about the strange relationship he has with Emiru over the course of his two years within art school.
Emiru Ikuno (生野 えみる, Ikuno Emiru)
Voiced by: Sara Kirigamine
Portrayed by: Chocolat Ikeda
The neighbor of Tatsuhiko. She entraps him in her schemes by taking a photo of him sprawled on top of her, and uses it in becoming peeping partners with him. She is manipulative and can read people's intentions, but there is a reason why she is such a cold exhibitionist, and why she chose him.
Yuri Kotobiki (琴引 友里, Kotobiki Yuri)
Voiced by: Mafuyu Hino
Portrayed by: Beni Itoh
She is Tatsuhiko’s first girlfriend. She loves him very much and spends a lot of time having sex with him, but she claims not to be able to be with him on weekends because of her strict father. Tatsuhiko inadvertently finds out that she is actually going out with another boyfriend during weekends. This revelation ends their relationship, although they ultimately reconcile and remain friends one year later.
Yonegawa Yoneyama (米山, Yoneyama Yonegawa)
Voiced by: Anchu Mogi
Portrayed by: Sū Suzuki
He is Tatsuhiko's classmate and male best friend. He is a merry and carefree person and often nags Tatsuhiko and Makiko.
Makiko Terakado (寺門 巻子, Terakado Makiko)
Voiced by: Yuka Hirata
Portrayed by: Ayumi Niijima
A mutual and supportive friend of Tatsuhiko, Yoneyama, and Emiru. She is also intelligent as she discovers the relationship between Tatsuhiko and Emiru by looking in the school register and finding out they are neighbors. Upon visiting Emiru's room, it is revealed that she is a lesbian (or bisexual) and loves Emiru. She also finds out about the peep hole between Tatsuhiko and Emiru's rooms. At the end of the story she is married and three months pregnant.
Makoto Horii (堀井 真, Horii Makoto)
Voiced by: Toru Kinoshita
Tatsuhiko's acquaintance early in the series. His obsession with Emiru leads him to attempt to rape her. He also uses Tatsuhiko as a hostage in his second attempt but fails when Emiru saves Tatsuhiko by throwing a bucket of gasoline and threatening Makoto's gang with a lighter.
Nanami Nomiya (野宮 ナナミ, Nomiya Nanami)
Portrayed by: Riri Kuribayashi
A girl that works with Tatsuhiko at the convenience store. She is revealed to be Makoto's girlfriend and uses her allure to persuade Tatsuhiko to assist in Makoto's plans for Emiru. It is shown that she deeply loves Makoto in despite his feelings towards Emiru and other women.
Shouko Honnami (本並 翔子, Honnami Shouko)
Voiced by: Haruka Toomi
Portrayed by: Rin Ogawa
One of Tatsuhiko's teachers. 28 years old. Tatsuhiko and Emiru meet her outside one day with tears in her eyes after her married lover had broken off the affair she was having with him. As a result, she tries to seduce Tatsuhiko, but with Emiru's help he is able to avoid her advances and get her to come back to her senses.
Tamako Naruse (成瀬 珠子, Naruse Tamako)
Portrayed by: Ayumi Kimino
Tatsuhiko’s childhood friend. She is a cheerful and lively girl that was very close with Tatsuhiko when he still lived with his parents. Tatsuhiko left his town after he tried to become intimate with her, only for Tamako's mischievous "boyfriends" to burst in on them when they were making love, thereby making him think that she had pulled a vicious prank on him when in fact she was truly in love with him. She would later break down in tears in front of the "boyfriends" who followed her around over the guilt she felt. After meeting him again, she comes over her lingering feelings for him and becomes ready for a new relationship.
Chisato Komori (小森 千里, Komori Chisato)
A popular girl from class known for her childish looks. It is shown that she hates Yuri and plans to have sex with Tatsuhiko during the school trip. She fails due to Emiru overhearing and later interfering with her plans.
Nao Kajiwara (梶原 奈緒, Kajiwara Nao)
A nude model for Tatsuhiko, Yoneyama and Emiru's painting class. Tatsuhiko claims that she seems familiar to him; the reason being that is a regular customer where he works part time. She befriends Tatsuhiko and Emiru upon seeing them in the convenience store. She chose to bring Tatsuhiko to her home because she could not stand the idea of waiting alone in her home for her ex-boyfriend to return. Her ex-boyfriend promised to return within 3 months time but he never showed up. She helps Tatsuhiko with his depression after his break-up with Yuri.
Madoka Watari (亘 まどか, Watari Madoka)
She is Tatsuhiko's second girlfriend. She is also Shirou and Rie's classmate in Graphic Design. She is often teased by Shirou and Rie because of her virginity. She took an interest in Tatsuhiko after he helped her to the Marketing Department when she was lost. She also has a close friendship with Emiru. During her relationship with Tatsuhiko, her obsession with him increased after she found out the peep hole. She continued to love him but she would never experience the love Tatsuhiko developed for Emiru. Eventually, Tatsuhiko would end their relationship. Madoka would experience happiness after finding a person who loved her deeply.
Shirou Mochizuki (望月 志郎, Mochizuki Shirou)
He is Madoka's classmate in Graphic Design and friend. He is also Rie's sex partner and revealed that they were high school friends. Because of his wealth, he didn't have any friends during his high school days. He also claims that he likes Emiru and wants to have sex with her. After he found out about the peep hole, he blackmailed Tatsuhiko and Emiru. He also attempted to have sex with Emiru during his stay over but was unsuccessful thanks to Tatsuhiko's machinations. In the end, he keeps quiet their secret and helps Rie get over her jealousy of others' happiness.
Rie Ueda (植田 理恵, Ueda Rie)
She is Madoka's classmate in Graphic Design and friend. She is also Shirou's sex partner and high school friend. It is revealed that during her high school years, both her parents cheated on each other. This affected Rie to the point that she became intimate with Shirou and wants to destroy the happiness of other people. After she found out the peep hole from Shirou, she manipulated Yoneyama into assisting in her plans to end the relationship between Emiru and Tatsuhiko.
Saki Koizumi (小泉 サキ, Koizumi Saki)
She was Emiru's best friend during high school. She works in Club Mobile as a hostess with an alias of Asada Saki. She also told Tatsuhiko about Emiru's past, particularly about her relationship with Tsugumi.
Tsugumi (つぐみ, Tsugumi)
She was Tomoya's girlfriend. She also has a sister-like relationship with Emiru. After Tomoya's death, she started to hate and despise Emiru.
Tomoya Ikuno (生野 智也, Ikuno Tomoya)
He was Emiru's step-brother and Tsugumi's boyfriend. He was known to be a prodigy in the family. Because of his strong relationship with his sister, he made a peep hole into her room. He had an argument with Emiru about the peep hole, resulting in his accidental death.
Mitsu Takahata
Portrayed by: Hiroki Setoguchi

== Media ==
=== Manga ===
==== Volume list ====
No.	Release date	ISBN
1	November 30, 2009	978-4-09-182726-5
1. "A Peephole"; 2. "New Lifestyle"; 3. "Classmate"; 4. "Kotobuki Yuri"; 5. "Because It's the Rule"; 6. "I'm Inviting You"; 7. "Horii Makoto"; 8. "Please Make Sure"; 9. "Let's Do It Tonight"
2	December 26, 2009	978-4-09-182859-0
10. "I Hate You"; 11. "Let's Do It a Lot"; 12. "Honnami Shouko"; 13. "Gentle Lie"; 14. "It's Perfect"; 15. "Nomiya Nanami"; 16. "Help Me!"; 17. "Forever from Now On"; 18. "Is It Fine?"
3	March 30, 2010	978-4-09-182877-4
19. "I've Been Had!"; 20. "Excitement"; 21. "I Came"; 22. "Just Get Out"; 23. "Let Me Make It Up"; 24. "Naruse Tamako"; 25. "Don't Break It"; 26. "Takahata Mitsuru"; 27. "It's a Trap!!"
4	April 28, 2010	978-4-09-183223-8
28. "I'm... Putting It In, You Hear?"; 29. "You Broke It...!"; 30. "I'll Do It"; 31. "I'll Believe In You!"; 32. "Komori Chisato"; 33. "I'll Do It For You"; 34. "Do You Like Me, Or What?"; 35. "Terakado Makiko"; 36. "Secret"
5	July 30, 2010	978-4-09-183449-2
37. "What's This"; 38. "Tears"; 39. "Not Coming"; 40. "Won't Forgive You"; 41. "I'll Expose You"; 42. "Don't!"; 43. "Smash It!!"; 44. "Congratulations"; 45. "I'm Scared"
6	October 29, 2010	978-4-09-183605-2
46. "Dig In"; 47. "I Won't Let You Stop It"; 48. "Second Year Students"; 49. "Watari Madoka"; 50. "If I Graduated"; 51. "Let's Go Out"; 52. "Kajiwara Nao"; 53. "Come Out of Your Hole"; 54. "Resolution"
7	March 30, 2011	978-4-09-183769-1
55. "I Am Lonely"; 56. "Let's Go to My Room"; 57. "Declaration of War"; 58. "Why?"; 59. "Fall in Love"; 60. "Feeling"; 61. "Because I'm Wet"; 62. "This Time for Sure"; 63. "Sin"
8	June 30, 2011	978-4-09-183875-9
64. "I Like It"; 65. "True Colors"; 66. "Peep"; 67. "Only You"; 68. "Two-timing"; 69. "Don't Wanna Show"; 70. "Ueda Rie"; 71. "Right Now!"; 72. "Companions"
9	September 30, 2011	978-4-09-184098-1
73. "Let Me Peep"; 74. "Interesting"; 75. "I'll Find Out"; 76. "What a Shame"; 77. "Last"; 78. "Beautiful"; 79. "Open"; 80. "Traitor!"; 81. "Despair"
10	January 30, 2012	978-4-09-184340-1
82. "Found You"; 83. "Visitor"; 84. "Tsugumi"; 85. "Like I Could!"; 86. "Delusion"; 87. "This Time..."; 88. "This Time 2"; 89. "Everything"; 90. "Thanks"
11	May 30, 2012	978-4-09-184539-9
91. "Can't See"; 92. "Treasure"; 93. "Letter"; 94. "Back Then"; 95. "Look"; 96. "Parting"; 97. "I'm Back"; 98. "Koizumi Saki"; 99. "Armor"
12	September 28, 2012	978-4-09-184713-3
100. "17 Years Old"; 101. "As They Are"; 102. "Impulse"; 103. "Completely Naked"; 104. "Meanie"; 105. "I Want to Meet With You"; 106. "Confession"; 107. "Continuation"; 108. "Everything"
13	February 28, 2013	978-4-09-184836-9
109. "Feel Good"; 110. "Revival"; 111. "Special Rule"; 112. "Teach Me"; 113. "Miracle"; 114. "Forever"; 115. "Embrace Me..."; 116. "Goodbye"; 117. "Final Chapter"

=== Original video adaptation ===
In September 2012, the wraparound jacket band of the twelfth volume of the manga announced that an anime adaptation of Nozoki Ana had been green-lighted. It took form of an OVA that was released on DVD on February 28, 2013, with the limited edition of the final manga volume. The extended Blu-ray version was released on May 24, 2013. It was Studio Fantasia's final anime production before filing for bankruptcy in 2016.

=== Film ===
A live-action film based on the manga and directed by Ataru Ueda and Kensuke Tsukuda was released in Japan on June 28, 2014.

== Reception ==
Nozoki Ana appeared on the Oricon bestseller list on three occasions. The first time was with the release of volume 7, which bottomed out the list at thirtieth during the week of March 28 – April 3, 2011. The second manga volume to make it onto the bestseller list was volume 10, which ranked fourteenth during the week of January 30–February 5, 2012. This was followed by volume 11, which ranked fifteenth during the week of May 28 – June 3, 2012. More than three million volumes of the manga have been sold.

== See also ==
- Hada Camera, another manga series by the same author
- Nozo × Kimi, another manga series by the same author
