= Hada Camera =

Japanese manga series

- Cover of the first tankōbon volume

ハダカメラ
- Genre: Romance
- Manga
- Written by: Wakō Honna
- Published by: Shogakukan
- Imprint: Big Comics Moba Man
- Magazine: Sunday Webry
- Original run: April 5, 2017 – February 6, 2019
- Volumes: 9
- icon

Hada Camera (Japanese: ハダカメラ, Hepburn: Hada Kamera; 'Naked Camera') is a Japanese manga series written and illustrated by Wakō Honna. It was serialized on Shogakukan's online platform Sunday Webry from April 2017 to February 2019, with its chapters collected in nine tankōbon volumes.

== Plot ==
Kagami Kyosuke failed his college entrance exam, so he gets a job at a fast food restaurant near the college to stay close to his crush Kojo Hikari. Since she is a fan of photography, he buys an old polaroid instant camera. He soon discovers the camera has supernatural powers. Only he can take a picture with it. When he takes a picture of Kojo and later hands the photo to his coworker Botan Oshikiri, it destroys Botan's clothes and temporarily transforms her into a copy of Kojo who is completely horny for Kagami. As they try to uncover the secrets of the camera, Botan struggles with her growing feelings for Kagami.

== Publication ==
Written and illustrated by Wakō Honna, Hada Camera was serialized on Shogakukan's online platform Sunday Webry from April 5, 2017, to February 6, 2019. Shogakukan collected its chapters in nine tankōbon volumes, released from September 12, 2017, to May 10, 2019.

=== Volumes ===
No.	Release date	ISBN
1	September 12, 2017	978-4-09-189674-2
2	December 12, 2017	978-4-09-189679-7
3	February 9, 2018	978-4-09-189769-5
4	May 11, 2018	978-4-09-860005-2
5	July 12, 2018	978-4-09-860034-2
6	October 12, 2018	978-4-09-860168-4
7	December 12, 2018	978-4-09-860192-9
8	March 12, 2019	978-4-09-860270-4
9	May 10, 2019	978-4-09-860339-8

== See also ==
- Nozoki Ana, another manga series by the same author
- Nozo × Kimi, another manga series by the same author
