= Cat + Crazy =

Japanese manga series

- First volume cover

ねこったけ! (Nekottake!)
- Genre: Comedy; Coming-of-age
- Manga
- Written by: Wataru Nadatani
- Published by: Shogakukan
- English publisher: NA: Dark Horse Comics
- Imprint: Shōnen Sunday Comics
- Magazine: Shōnen Sunday S
- Original run: October 24, 2015 – February 23, 2018
- Volumes: 6
- icon

Cat + Crazy (Japanese: ねこったけ!, Hepburn: Nekottake!) is a Japanese manga series written and illustrated by Wataru Nadatani. It was serialized in Shogakukan's shōnen manga magazine Shōnen Sunday S from October 2015 to February 2018, with its chapters collected in six tankōbon volumes.

== Plot ==
High school student Kensuke Fuji loves cats but cannot have one of his own. After meeting Jin Nekoya, a "cat master", Kensuke becomes his disciple, hoping to learn everything about cats.

== Publication ==
Written and illustrated by Wataru Nadatani, Cat + Crazy was serialized in Shogakukan's shōnen manga magazine Shōnen Sunday S from October 24, 2015, to February 23, 2018. Shogakukan collected its chapters in six tankōbon volumes, released from March 18, 2016, to April 18, 2018.

In November 2024, Dark Horse Comics announced that it had licensed the manga for English release in North America, and the first volume is set to be released on June 24, 2025.

=== Volumes ===
No.	Original release date	Original ISBN	English release date	English ISBN
1	May 18, 2016	978-4-09-126250-9	July 29, 2025	978-1-5067-4708-8
2	July 15, 2016	978-4-09-127319-2	November 4, 2025	978-1-5067-4709-5
3	January 18, 2017	978-4-09-127490-8	April 21, 2026	978-1-5067-4710-1
4	August 18, 2017	978-4-09-127682-7	August 18, 2026	978-1-5067-4711-8
5	January 18, 2018	978-4-09-128080-0	—	—
6	April 18, 2018	978-4-09-128246-0	—	—

== See also ==
- Cat + Gamer, another manga series by the same author
