= 100 Ghost Stories That Will Lead to My Own Death =

Japanese manga series

- First tankōbon volume cover

僕が死ぬだけの百物語 (Boku ga Shinu dake no Hyakumonogatari)
- Genre: Horror; Supernatural
- Manga
- Written by: Anji Matono
- Published by: Shogakukan
- English publisher: NA: Seven Seas Entertainment; SEA: Shogakukan Asia
- Imprint: Shōnen Sunday Comics Special
- Magazine: Shōnen Sunday S; Sunday Webry
- Original run: December 25, 2020 – March 14, 2025
- Volumes: 10
- icon

100 Ghost Stories That Will Lead to My Own Death (Japanese: 僕が死ぬだけの百物語, Hepburn: Boku ga Shinu dake no Hyakumonogatari) is a Japanese manga series written and illustrated by Anji Matono. It was serialized in Shogakukan's shōnen manga magazine Shōnen Sunday S and on the Sunday Webry website from December 2020 to March 2025; its chapters were collected in tankōbon volumes. The series follows a young boy recounting ghost stories to an entity, as evil events start to occur. The series is licensed for English release in North America by Seven Seas Entertainment and in Southeast Asia by Shogakukan Asia.

== Plot ==
The story centers on Yuuma (ユウマ), a young elementary school boy who loses his mother and is subjected to severe abuse and neglect by his foster parents. Driven to the edge of despair, Yuuma tries to jump to his death from his school classroom window. His classmate Hina stops him and stalls for time by telling him about the traditional Japanese Hyakumonogatari Kaidankai (One Hundred Ghost Stories) ritual—the belief that once a person tells 100 ghost stories, actual ghosts and spirits will manifest. Finding a twisted sense of hope and a reason to keep going day by day, Yuuma begins narrating a dark, standalone horror or psychological story in each chapter as he counts his way up to 100.

Each chapter (or cluster of chapters) features a unique, grim, and visceral horror tale—ranging from supernatural specters and cursed objects to human cruelty and bizarre urban legend-style fates. Interspersed between the horrific tales are brief framing segments where Yuuma speaks directly to an unseen presence or entity.

== Publication ==
Written and illustrated by Anji Matono, 100 Ghost Stories That Will Lead to My Own Death started in Shogakukan's shōnen manga magazine Shōnen Sunday S on December 25, 2020. The series was also published on the Sunday Webry website, where it finished on March 14, 2025; it finished in Shōnen Sunday S on April 25 of that same year. Shogakukan collected its chapters in ten individual tankōbon volumes, released from August 12, 2021, to May 12, 2025.

In May 2024, Seven Seas Entertainment announced that they had licensed the manga for English release in North America, with the first volume released in December of the same year. In Southeast Asia, the series is licensed by Shogakukan Asia, and released under the title 100 Ghost Stories to Die For.

=== Volumes ===
No.	Original release date	Original ISBN	English release date	English ISBN
1	August 12, 2021	978-4-09-850659-0	December 10, 2024	979-8-89160-594-7
2	December 10, 2021	978-4-09-850813-6	April 8, 2025	979-8-89160-918-1
3	April 12, 2022	978-4-09-851069-6	August 12, 2025	979-8-89373-341-9
4	August 12, 2022	978-4-09-851221-8	December 9, 2025	979-8-89373-342-6
5	January 12, 2023	978-4-09-851523-3	May 12, 2026	979-8-89373-343-3
6	July 12, 2023	978-4-09-852540-9	October 13, 2026	979-8-89561-345-0
7	February 9, 2024	978-4-09-853110-3	—	—
8	July 11, 2024	978-4-09-853428-9	—	—
9	December 12, 2024	978-4-09-853736-5	—	—
10	May 12, 2025	978-4-09-854089-1	—	—

== Reception ==
The manga was nominated for the Next Manga Award's web category in 2022 and 2023.

== See also ==
- Hyakumonogatari Kaidankai
