= George Abe =

Japanese author and yakuza (1937–2019)

- 安部 譲二
- Born: Naoya Abe (安部 直也); May 17, 1937; Tokyo, Empire of Japan (Currently Shinagawa-ku, Tokyo, Japan)
- Died: September 2, 2019 (aged 82)
- Occupation: Author
- Writing career
- Notable work: Rainbow: Nisha Rokubō no Shichinin
- Website: www.abegeorge.net

Naoya Abe (Japanese: 安部 直也, Hepburn: Abe Naoya; May 17, 1937 – September 2, 2019), known by his pen name George Abe (安部 譲二, Abe Jōji), was a Japanese author and former yakuza. Outside Japan, he is best known for writing the manga series Rainbow: Nisha Rokubō no Shichinin in collaboration with artist Masasumi Kakizaki. As a teenager, Abe became a member of the Ando-gumi yakuza family, and was later recruited by the Koganei-ikka. In 1986, after leaving the yakuza life, he wrote a novel about his time in Fuchū Prison titled Hei no Naka no Korinai Menmen (塀の中の懲りない面々), which became a bestseller and was adapted into a film. Abe died on September 2, 2019, from pneumonia, aged 82.

Abe worked as a flight attendant for Japan Airlines from 1961 to 1965. He was the model for Jōji Miyagi, the main character in Yukio Mishima's entertainment romance novel Fukuzatsuna Kare (複雑な彼 That Complicated Guy) published in 1966. Abe's pen name "Jōji" was adapted from the character in the novel.
