= Kōichirō Yasunaga =

Japanese manga artist (born 1962)

- Born: January 13, 1962 (age 64); Oita, Japan
- Occupation: Manga artist

Kōichirō Yasunaga (安永航一郎, Yasunaga Kōichirō; January 13, 1962) is a Japanese manga artist who made his debut in Shōnen Sunday in 1980. He is best known for his manga titled Prefectural Earth Defense Force.

== Works ==
- MM Little Morning (MMリトルモーニング/青空にとおく酒浸り)
- Prefectural Earth Defense Force
- Rikugun Nakano Yobikō (陸軍中野予備校)
- Kyonyū Hunter (巨乳ハンター)
- Kaitei Junrui Anchovie (海底人類アンチョビー)
- Chō Kankaku Analman (超感覚ANALマン)
- Kaseijin Deka (火星人刑事)
- Eichi Man (エイチマン)
- Ganjō Ningen Spartacus (頑丈人間スパルタカス)
- Chōjin Totokarucho (超人トトカルチョ, yet to be published in Japan, but has been published in Taiwan and China)
- Jitsuroku Jion Taiiku Daigaku (実録ジオン体育大学, yet to be published in Japan, but has been published in Taiwan and China)
