= Rainbow: Nisha Rokubō no Shichinin =

Japanese manga series

- First tankōbon volume cover, featuring Mario Minakami

RAINBOW 二舎六房の七人 (Reinbō Ni-sha roku bō no shichi-nin)
- Genre: Prison drama
- Manga
- Written by: George Abe
- Illustrated by: Masasumi Kakizaki
- Published by: Shogakukan
- Imprint: YS Comics
- Magazine: Weekly Young Sunday (2002–2008); Weekly Big Comic Spirits (2009–2010)
- Original run: November 21, 2002 – January 4, 2010
- Volumes: 22
- Anime television series
- Directed by: Hiroshi Kōjina
- Produced by: Toshio Nakatani; Manabu Tamura
- Written by: Hideo Takayashiki
- Music by: Yū Takami
- Studio: Madhouse
- Licensed by: NA: Discotek Media
- Original network: Nippon TV
- Original run: April 6, 2010 – September 28, 2010
- Episodes: 26
- icon

Rainbow: Nisha Rokubō no Shichinin (RAINBOW 二舎六房の七人; 'Rainbow: The Seven from Block 2, Cell 6'), is a Japanese manga series written by George Abe and illustrated by Masasumi Kakizaki. It was serialized in Shogakukan's seinen manga magazines Weekly Young Sunday (2002–2008) and Weekly Big Comic Spirits (2009–2010), with its chapters collected in 22 tankōbon volumes. The story is set in the 1950s and focuses on six junior delinquents sent to the Shōnan Special Reformatory. They learn to cope with the atrocities and unfairness they encounter there.

A 26-episode anime television series adaptation produced by Madhouse and directed by Hiroshi Kōjina was broadcast on Nippon TV from April to September 2010.

The manga has had over 3.3 million copies in circulation. In 2006, Rainbow won the 51st Shogakukan Manga Award in the general category.

== Synopsis ==
In 1955, there were six boys who committed crimes and fell into the Shōnan Special Reformatory, block 2, cell 6. The story follows the boys' lives during their time in the reformatory and the years after they leave, highlighting the struggles the lower class faced in post-war Japanese society.

The manga is divided into four story chapters: chapter one is set in 1955–56; chapter two in 1957–58; chapter three in 1960–64; and chapter four in 1953–55 and 1964–68. Tokyo and Shōnan are the main settings.

== Characters ==
=== Block 2, Cell 6 ===
Rokurouta Sakuragi (桜木 六郎太, Sakuragi Rokurōta)
Voiced by: Rikiya Koyama
Nicknamed "Bro" (アンチャン, Anchan) for his protective nature, he is a senior inmate in Block 2, Cell 6 imprisoned for assaulting an American soldier. An aspiring boxer, he mentors six fellow prisoners, teaching them perseverance through his philosophy of "love and courage." His incarceration stems from taking responsibility for Tetsu Sakota's murder of an American soldier after a rigged boxing match. Despite learning this truth, he maintains loyalty to Sakota. After escaping briefly and forming a relationship with nurse Setsuko, he is fatally shot by American soldiers following manipulation by Sasaki. His legacy lives on through his will and a bullet passed to his inmates, along with a secret compromising Officer Ishihara's career.
Mario Minakami (水上 真理雄, Minakami Mario)
Voiced by: Shun Oguri
Mario, imprisoned for attempted murder, possesses a volatile temperament balanced by fierce loyalty. The last of his group to be released, he recovers from a crushed right fist through risky surgery. Inheriting Rokurouta's aspirations, he trains to become a world boxing champion. After placing boxing shoes at Rokurouta's grave for the latter's mother, Mario gradually assumes Rokurouta's physical resemblance. He survives near-fatal injuries sustained while rescuing Setsuko from criminals, though loses vision in his left eye. Supported by Cabbage and Jimmy, he trains in Hawaii while drawing strength from Rokurouta's legacy. After honoring his promise to Rokurouta with Sakota, Mario departs for the United States to pursue personal fulfillment, remaining the only character without a definitive conclusion.
Noboru Maeda (前田 昇, Maeda Noboru)
Voiced by: Romi Park
Nicknamed "Turtle" (スッポン, Suppon; 'Chinese soft-shelled turtle') for his biting attacks, he is imprisoned for grand larceny. An orphan of the Hiroshima atomic bombing, the short-statured convict bears distinctive 10-yen coin-sized bald spots. A natural businessman with aspirations of wealth, he maintains close bonds with cellmates Cabbage and Scam. Upon release, he establishes Maeda Finance after working in black markets and moneylending. His financial acumen allows him to support former inmates while building his own fortune, eventually owning two buildings and nearing his millionaire ambitions.
Tadayoshi Tooyama (遠山 忠義, Tōyama Tadayoshi)
Voiced by: Takaya Kuroda
Nicknamed "Soldier" (ヘイタイ, Heitai) for his military aspirations, he is imprisoned for violent conduct and unlawful confinement. A physically imposing yet principled man with distinctive facial scars, he joins the Japan Self-Defense Forces upon release. His military career ends when he assumes blame for crimes committed by a foreign con group to protect Mario, resulting in imprisonment. After his release, secured by Scam's efforts, he becomes a reformatory guard providing emotional support to inmates. Personally, he marries Meg (Joe's sister) and starts a family while continuing his rehabilitative work.
Ryuuji Nomoto (野本 龍次, Nomoto Ryūji)
Voiced by: Keiji Fujiwara
Nicknamed "Scam" (バレモト, Baremoto) for his personal motto, he is incarcerated for fraud, embezzlement, and theft. The wartime death of his father in Manchuria left him distrustful until helped by strangers. Recognizable by his slipping glasses, he maintains a brotherly bond with Turtle. After release, he studies law under prosecutor Takada while attending night school, though he has failed the bar examination seven times. His efforts focus on reducing Soldier's legal charges for crimes committed by a foreign con group. He supports his mother and two younger brothers who share his resemblance.
Jou Yokosuka (横須賀 丈, Yokosuka Jō)
Voiced by: Tatsuya Hasome
Nicknamed "Joe" (ジョー, Jō), he is imprisoned for assault and illicit sexual conduct. A mixed-race orphan with distinctive blond hair, blue eyes, and a facial mole, he endured childhood sexual abuse at an orphanage before being separated from his sister Meg. After their eventual reunion, he supports her relationship with Soldier. Pursuing a singing career, he initially performs in bars before achieving mainstream success. His fame grows substantial enough to attract devoted fans. As an established performer, he assists the criminal Sakota to honor a promise made to Rokurouta.
Mansaku Matsuura (松浦 万作, Matsuura Mansaku)
Voiced by: Tomohiro Waki
Nicknamed "Cabbage" (キャベツ, Kyabetsu) for his Ariocarpus retusus shoulder tattoo, he is imprisoned for assault and public intoxication. A physically powerful but simple-minded man, he struggles to find direction after release until becoming a professional wrestler through Aritou's assistance. As "Mammoth Matsuura", he builds a wrestling career in the United States while supporting Mario's rehabilitation in Hawaii. He maintains contact with former inmates and eventually marries Ruriko.

=== Friends ===
Setsuko Koike (小池 節子, Koike Setsuko) / Setsuko Norimatsu (則松 節子, Norimatsu Setsuko)
Voiced by: Shihori Kanjiya
A nurse who shelters the escapees from the reformatory, she was once Rokurouta's lover. When Mario develops feelings for her, she briefly reciprocates before leaving him. She later marries Yasurou Norimatsu, with whom she has a son, Takurou. Despite the challenges of single motherhood and the turmoil caused by the foreign con group, she leads a stable life working as a nurse at Higashida Hospital.
Lily (リリィ, Ririi)
Voiced by: Kaori Yamagata
A prostitute with connections to the U.S. military base, she assists the seven inmates through her relationship with a high-ranking officer. After losing her savings during the officer's repatriation, she works as a live-in domestic helper before establishing her own restaurant. She becomes a supportive maternal figure for the six inmates and Meg.
Meg Yokosuka (横須賀 メグ, Yokosuka Megu)
Voiced by: Megumi Toyoguchi
Meg, Joe's younger sister, is adopted at age 12 by a promiscuous man while her brother remains incarcerated. She initially rejects Joe's rescue attempt to protect him, enduring subsequent sexual abuse before escaping at 15 to work in cabarets. Later assisting Lily in her restaurant, she marries Soldier and remains steadfast during his imprisonment. After fulfilling Rokurouta's promise, she becomes pregnant and finds personal happiness.
Ruriko (ルリ子)
A third-generation Japanese American from Hawaii, she travels to Japan for homemaking training. Assigned to motorcycle traffic control under Turtle's supervision during compulsory service, she develops romantic feelings for Mario. However, recognizing his unresolved attachment to Setsuko, she withdraws from the relationship. She subsequently marries Cabbage.
Iwasaki (岩崎)
A member of the Japan Self-Defense Forces and Soldier's junior, he avoids juvenile reformatory for theft by enlisting through a regional liaison. Initially unable to swim, he overcomes this weakness during the Kano River typhoon rescue operation while working alongside Soldier. Later, he fulfills his promise to Rokurouta and sees Mario off to the United States in place of Soldier, who is imprisoned.

=== Shōnan Special Reformatory ===
Ishihara (石原)
Voiced by: Kōji Ishii
A jailer at Shōnan Special Reformatory, he conspires with Sasaki to prevent Rokurouta's release due to Rokurouta's knowledge of a past incident. His actions contribute to the deaths of his colleague Kumagai and Rokurouta. Addicted to stimulants, he suffers severe physical and mental deterioration, eventually losing the ability to distinguish between Rokurouta and Mario. His condition worsens to the point of permanent disability.
Gisuke Sasaki (佐々木 義助, Sasaki Gisuke)
Voiced by: Takaya Hashi
The reformatory's commissioned doctor abuses his position by sexually assaulting incarcerated boys. When Rokurouta discovers evidence of his misconduct, the doctor conspires with Ishihara to suppress the information. Later, after mortgaging a hospital to fund his campaign, he becomes the leading mayoral candidate until the six inmates publicly expose his crimes during an election speech, costing him the race.
Kumagai (熊谷)
Voiced by: Tsuyoshi Aoki
A compassionate and sympathetic figure unlike Ishihara, he earns the trust of the seven inmates, who refer to him as "Dr. Kumagai". He secretly supports them despite surveillance by Sasaki and Ishihara. When Ishihara discovers his actions, he is killed in a staged accident.
Eiichi Hagino (荻野 栄一, Hagino Eiichi)
Voiced by: Kōhei Kiyasu
Incarcerated at Shōnan Special Reformatory for robbery, he becomes Sasaki's pawn after being promised a reduced sentence—a promise later broken, driving him to despair. Before committing suicide, he confides in Rokurouta, revealing the truth and evidence of the incident.

== Media ==
=== Manga ===
Rainbow is written by George Abe and illustrated by Masasumi Kakizaki. Abe wrote the series based on his own experience in prison. The manga started its serialization in Shogakukan's seinen manga magazine Weekly Young Sunday on November 21, 2002. (Note: It started in the magazine's 51st issue of 2002, (cover date December 5), released on November 21 of that same year.) After Weekly Young Sunday ceased its publication on July 31, 2008, the series was transferred to Weekly Big Comic Spirits, starting on June 15, 2009. The series finished on January 4, 2010. Shogakukan collected its chapters in twenty-two tankōbon volumes, released from April 5, 2003, to February 27, 2010.

=== Anime ===
An anime television series adaptation was produced by Nippon TV, VAP, and animation studio Madhouse, directed by Hiroshi Kōjina, with Hideo Takayashiki handling series composition, Ai Kikuchi designing the characters and Yū Takami composing the music. The series ran for 26 episodes on Nippon TV from April 6 to September 28, 2010. The opening theme is "We're Not Alone", performed by Coldrain, and the ending theme is "A Far-Off Distance", performed by Galneryus.

The series was simulcast by Funimation with English subtitles in 2010. In October 2023, Discotek Media announced that it had acquired the series. It was released on a Blu-ray Disc set, including Japanese audio with English subtitles, on February 27, 2024.

== Reception ==
The manga has had over 3.3 million copies in circulation. In 2006, Rainbow: Nisha Rokubō no Shichinin won the 51st Shogakukan Manga Award in the General category, sharing the award with A Spirit of the Sun.
