= Masasumi Kakizaki =

Japanese manga artist (born 1978)

Masasumi Kakizaki 柿崎正澄
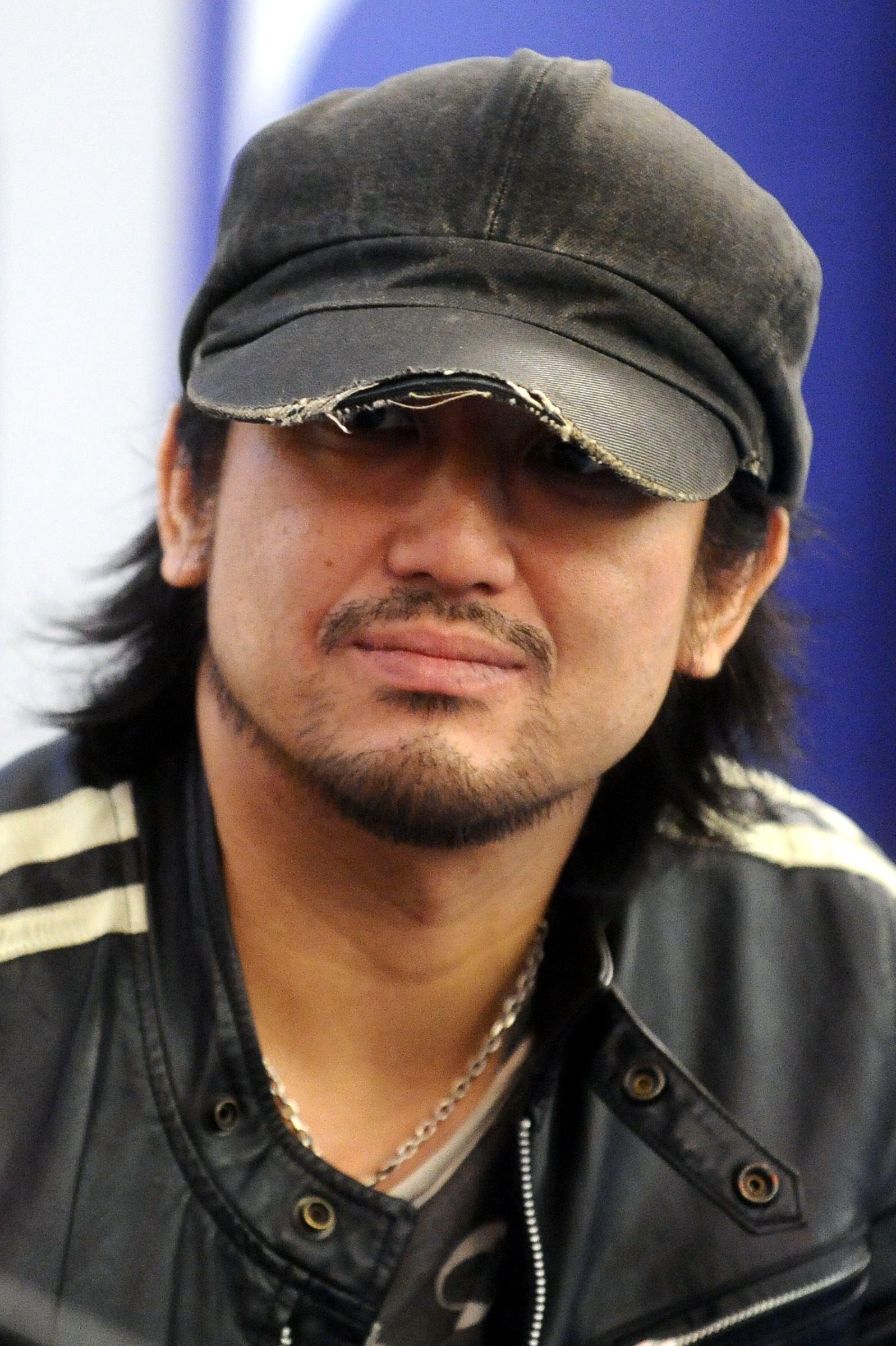
- Kakizaki at Lucca Comics & Games in 2014
- Born: May 18, 1978 (age 48) Monbetsu, Hokkaido, Japan
- Area: Manga artist
- Notable works: Rainbow: Nisha Rokubō no Shichinin; Green Blood
- Collaborators: Shūhō Satō; George Abe
- Awards: 51st Shogakukan Manga Award in the general category

Masasumi Kakizaki (Japanese: 柿崎正澄, Hepburn: Kakizaki Masasumi; born May 18, 1978) is a Japanese manga artist. He debuted in 2001 with the one-shot Two Tops prior to launching his first series, X-Gene, in 2002. Rainbow: Nisha Rokubō no Shichinin, which he illustrated, won the Shogakukan Manga Award in the general category in 2005.

== Works ==
Title	Year	Magazine	Publisher(s)	Notes	Ref.
Two Tops (ツートップ, Tsūtoppu)	2001	Separate Volume Weekly Young Sunday	Shogakukan	One-shot	
X-Gene	2002	Weekly Young Sunday	Shogakukan	With Kentaro Fumizuki	
Rainbow: Nisha Rokubō no Shichinin (RAINBOW-二舎六房の七人-)	2002–2010	Weekly Young Sunday; Big Comic Spirits	Shogakukan	With George Abe	
Hideout	2010	Big Comic Spirits	Shogakukan		
Bestiarius (闘獣士 ベスティアリウス, Tōjūshi Besutiariusu)	2011–2018	Weekly Shōnen Sunday; Shōnen Sunday S	Shogakukan		
Green Blood	2011–2013	Weekly Young Magazine	Kodansha		
Wife of a Spy (スパイの妻, Supai no Tsuma)	2020–2021	Monthly Sunday Gene-X	Shogakukan	Based on Wife of a Spy	
The Tree of Death: Yomotsuhegui (ヨモツヘグイ 死者の国の果実, Yomotsuhegui: Shisha no Kuni no Kajitsu)	2021–2023	Monthly Young Magazine	Kodansha		

== Awards ==
Year	Award	Category	Work/Recipient	Result	Ref
2005	51st Shogakukan Manga Award	Best General Manga	Rainbow: Nisha Rokubō no Shichinin	Won	
