= Critical Blow =

1997 video game

- Developer: Racdym
- Publisher: Banpresto
- Platform: PlayStation
- Release: JP: December 4, 1997
- Genre: Fighting game

Critical Blow is a 1997 Japanese video game for the Sony PlayStation developed by Racdym and published by Banpresto. It is a three dimensional fighting game, and is a sequel to Genei Tougi: Shadow Struggle. It features character designs by manga artist Ryōji Minagawa. The game was never released outside of Japan.

== Gameplay ==
The game uses three dimensional polygons to render the graphics, and runs at 60fps.

It features four distinct gameplay modes: tournament mode, theater mode, VS mode, and a trading mode. Trading mode allows for the customization of characters using skills earned by defeating computer controlled opponents.

== Story ==
Two years since the first Power of Solid worldwide martial arts tournament, its core sponsor, the Phillips Konzern, mysteriously encountered financial difficulties and was taken over by a rival corporation, the UK based Merkuar Conglomorate. Hosting the second known Power of Solid Tournament, the Merkuar Conglomorate sends out invitations throughout the world to martial artists, in a proof of participation by a scarab motif jeweled brooch. However, unlike the first P.O.S. Tournaments, where the world watched from multimedia broadcasts and official sponsored events by the millions, this Power of Solid Tournament is more shadowy, and more brutal, in where all participants are allowed by any means to win.

In the city state of Hong Kong, young teenage martial artist Rickey Leon has become his nation's breakout national champion. Having received one of these invitations to the Power of Solid tournament, his grandmother, his only known family, is murdered at their doorstep by a mysterious assailant. Wishing to know what these newfound events mean, Rickey follows forward on his journey, to fight his way to the truth.

== Development ==
The game was developed by Japanese game developer Racdym. It is a sequel to Genei Tougi: Shadow Struggle and many characters returned in that game.

Character designs for the game were created by manga artist Ryoji Minagawa who is best known as the illustrator of the series Spriggan. To render the animations in the game, the developers used motion capture.

== Release ==
Critical Blow was released on December 4, 1997, for the Sony PlayStation home console and was published by Banpresto. The game was never released outside of Japan, nor was it ever re-released through the PlayStation Network Game Archives.

== Reception ==
Reception

Review scores
Publication	Score
Famitsu	26/40
GameSpot	6.9/10
Mega Fun	74/100
GameFan	93/100

Gamespot gave the game a score of 6.9 out of 10.

MegaFun gave the game a score of 74 out of 100.

Famitsu gave the game a score of 26 out of 40.

Three reviewers for GameFan gave it scores of 95, 92, and 92.
