= Genei Tougi: Shadow Struggle =

1996 Japanese video game for the Sony PlayStation

- Developer: Racdym
- Publisher: Banpresto
- Platform: PlayStation
- Release: JP: September 20, 1996
- Genre: Fighting
- Modes: Single-player, multiplayer

Genei Tougi: Shadow Struggle is a 1996 Japanese video game for the Sony PlayStation developed by Racdym and published by Banpresto. It is a fighting game featuring fully three dimensional characters and character designs by manga artist Ryōji Minagawa. The game was never released outside of Japan, and was followed up by the sequel Critical Blow.

== Gameplay ==
The game uses three dimensional polygons to render the graphics, and runs at 60fps. In total there are eight playable characters to choose from. In Arena mode, the player can purchase new moves with credits won from winning matches.

This mode is similar to Learning Mode from Virtua Fighter 2.

== Development ==
Character designs for the game were created by manga artist Ryoji Minagawa who is best known as the illustrator of the series Spriggan. To render the animations in the game, the developers used motion capture.

Later, the game was shown at the Tokyo Game Show '96 by Banpresto alongside their other titles which were Zeraim Zone for the PlayStation and Batsugun for the Sega Saturn.

== Release ==
Genei Tougi: Shadow Struggle was released on September 20, 1996 for the Sony PlayStation home console and was published by Banpresto. The game was never released outside of Japan, nor was it ever re-released through the PlayStation Network Game Archives.

The game was followed up by the sequel Critical Blow, and many characters returned in that game.

== Reception ==
Reception

Review scores
Publication	Score
Famitsu	26/40
Mega Fun	79/100
Super GamePower	4.5/5
Fun Generation	6/10

Weekly Famitsu gave the game a score of 26 out of 40.

MegaFun gave the game an overall score of 79, and a score of 76 for the graphic and a 73 for sound. He said the game had elements from other games such as Learning Mode from Virtua Fighter, and had similarities (including animations) to Tekken 2. Overall though, he said it was an enjoyable game but doesn't reach the heights of other games in the genre.

Super GamePower gave the game an overall score of 4.2 out of 5.

Fun Generation gave it a score of 6 out of 10.
