= Tantei Xeno to Nanatsu no Satsujin Misshitsu =

Japanese manga series

- First tankōbon volume cover

探偵ゼノと7つの殺人密室 (Tantei Zeno to Nanatsu no Satsujin Misshitsu)
- Genre: Mystery
- Manga
- Written by: Kyoichi Nanatsuki
- Illustrated by: Teppei Sugiyama
- Published by: Shogakukan
- Imprint: Shōnen Sunday Comics
- Magazine: Weekly Shōnen Sunday
- Original run: November 29, 2017 – July 17, 2019
- Volumes: 8
- icon

Tantei Xeno to Nanatsu no Satsujin Misshitsu (Japanese: 探偵ゼノと7つの殺人密室, Hepburn: Tantei Zeno to Nanatsu no Satsujin Misshitsu) lit. 'Detective Xeno and the Seven Locked Murder Rooms' is a Japanese manga series written by Kyoichi Nanatsuki and illustrated by Teppei Sugiyama. It was serialized in Shogakukan's shōnen manga magazine Weekly Shōnen Sunday from November 2017 to July 2019, with its chapters collected in eight tankōbon volumes.

== Publication ==
Written by Kyoichi Nanatsuki and illustrated by Teppei Sugiyama, Tantei Xeno to Nanatsu no Satsujin Misshitsu was serialized in Shogakukan's shōnen manga magazine Weekly Shōnen Sunday from November 29, 2017, to July 17, 2019. Shogakukan collected its chapters in eight tankōbon volumes, released from April 18, 2018, to September 18, 2019.

=== Volumes ===
No.	Release date	ISBN
1	April 18, 2018	978-4-09-128243-9
2	July 18, 2018	978-4-09-128335-1
3	October 18, 2018	978-4-09-128555-3
4	January 18, 2019	978-4-09-128777-9
5	April 18, 2019	978-4-09-129130-1
6	June 18, 2019	978-4-09-129170-7
7	August 16, 2019	978-4-09-129317-6
8	September 18, 2019	978-4-09-129334-3

== See also ==
- Project ARMS, another manga series written by Nanatsuki
- Area D, another manga series written by Nanatsuki
