= Ryōji Minagawa =

Japanese manga artist (born 1964)

Ryoji Minagawa
- Born: July 5, 1964 (age 62); Sumida, Tokyo, Japan
- Occupation: Manga artist
- Known for: Spriggan, D-Live!!, ARMS

Ryōji Minagawa (皆川 亮二, Minagawa Ryōji; born July 5, 1964) is a Japanese manga artist born in Sumida, Tokyo.

He was invited with Spriggan story writer Hiroshi Takashige to go to a comic convention in Portugal in 1996 as a guest of honor due to his work on Spriggan. He worked on other manga comics before he went on to create Project ARMS with fellow manga artist, Kyoichi Nanatsuki. His first name is sometimes transliterated as Ryouji.

== History ==
Minagawa was born in Sumida, Tokyo. He was the classmate of Masaomi Kanzaki when he was studying in high school. He made his manga debut with HEAVEN in 1988. From 1991 to 1996, he worked with fellow artist Hiroshi Takashige in working on the 11 volumes of Spriggan. His work had brought him fame across North America and Europe. After work on Spriggan was complete, he went on to do Kyo in 1996, followed by the creation of ARMS from 1997 to 2002.

In 1999, he received the 44th Shogakukan Manga Awards in the shōnen category for Project ARMS. In 2003, he created D-Live!!. In December 2006, he had done work on a manga named S.O.L. He is currently attending to work on a new manga called Peacemaker, serializing in Ultra Jump. Subsequently, he has been working on another manga called ADAMAS, which had been serialized in Kodansha's Evening magazine. He said in an interview that he was inspired to be a manga artist when he watched films made by George Lucas, Francis Ford Coppola and Steven Spielberg.

== Known works ==
=== Manga ===
- HEAVEN (1988): Original creator, also his debut manga.
- Spriggan (1991–1996): Art
- Kyo (1996): Original creator
- Project ARMS (1997–2002): Original creator
- D-Live!! (2003–2006): Original creator
- S.O.L. (2006): Original creator
- Intruder: Original creator
- Peace Maker (2007): Original creator
- ADAMAS (2007): Original creator
- Hellhound (2022–): Original creator

=== TV ===
- Project ARMS (TV: 2001): Original creator
- Kiddy Grade (TV: 2002–2003): Eyecatch Illustration (ep 14)

=== Video games ===
- Critical Blow (PlayStation): Character Designer
- Genei Tougi: Shadow Struggle (PlayStation): Character Designer
- Live A Live (SNES): Character Designer ("Present Day" chapter)
- Project ARMS (PlayStation 2): Original Artist
- Spriggan: Lunar Verse (PlayStation): Original Creator
- Tekken 5 (PlayStation 2): Marshall Law and Lee Chaolan 3P Character Model Designer
- Tekken 6 (PlayStation 3, Xbox 360): Roger Jr. 3P Character Model Designer
- Tekken Tag Tournament 2 (PlayStation 3, Xbox 360, Wii U): Miguel Caballero Rojo 2P Character Model Designer
- Tsukiyo ni Saraba (PlayStation 2): Character Designer

== Other works ==
- Minagawa contributed an illustration for the Metal Gear Solid Premium Package edition released in Japan, which is featured in the Metal Gear Solid Classified booklet. The artwork depicts the six main members of FOXHOUND, the antagonists in the game.

Ryouji Minagawa's contribution to the Metal Gear Solid: Classified booklet.
