= Yugo (manga) =

Japanese manga series and its adaptation

- First tankōbon volume cover, featuring Yugo Beppu

勇午 (Yūgo)
- Genre: Adventure; Mystery; Political thriller
- Manga
- Written by: Shinji Makari
- Illustrated by: Shū Akana
- Published by: Kodansha
- Imprint: Afternoon KC
- Magazine: Monthly Afternoon
- Original run: December 25, 1993 – July 24, 2004
- Volumes: 22
- Manga

Yugo the Negotiator
- Written by: Shinji Makari
- Illustrated by: Shū Akana
- Published by: Kodansha
- Imprint: Evening KC (2004); Evening KC Deluxe (2005–2015)
- Magazine: Evening
- Original run: January 27, 2004 – November 10, 2015
- Volumes: 19
- Novel

Yugo the Negotiator in Russia & India
- Written by: Shinji Makari
- Published by: Kodansha
- Imprint: Afternoon Novels
- Published: May 14, 1999
- Anime television series

Yugo the Negotiator
- Directed by: Seiji Kishi (#1–6); Shinya Hanai (#7–13)
- Produced by: Rika Sasaki; Hitoshi Hayakawa; Shūji Yoshida; Satoshi Yamada; Shirō Hirano; Hidemi Terada
- Written by: Kazuharu Sato (#1–6); Kenichi Kanemaki (#7–13)
- Music by: Susumu Ueda
- Studio: G&G Direction (#1–6); Artland (#7–13)
- Licensed by: NA: ADV Films
- Original network: Kids Station
- English network: Anime Network
- Original run: February 25, 2004 – May 26, 2004
- Episodes: 13
- icon

Yugo (Japanese: 勇午, Hepburn: Yūgo) is a Japanese manga series written by Shinji Makari and illustrated by Shū Akana. It was serialized in Kodansha's seinen manga magazine Monthly Afternoon from December 1993 to July 2004, with its chapters collected in 22 tankōbon volumes. The series was transferred to Kodansha's Evening magazine in January 2004 with the subtitle "the Negotiator" added in, where it was serialized until November 2015; an additional 19 volumes were published. Subsequent compilations of the original manga series also include this subtitle. The story follows Yugo Beppu, a hostage negotiator who takes on cases around the world.

An anime television series adaptation produced by G&G Direction and Artland aired from February to May 2004, comprising the manga's first two major story arcs within 13 episodes.

== Plot ==
The story follows Yugo Beppu, a hostage negotiator, in various cases around the world. Having both a very tough body and determination, and his keen insight, Yugo often goes to great lengths to rescue those he is tasked to, without resorting to physical violence.

== Characters ==
Yugo Beppu (別府 勇午, Beppu Yūgo)
Voiced by: Takashi Hagino (Japanese); Jason Douglas (English)
The main protagonist, hailing from Usuki. Yugo works as a hostage negotiator with a 97.4% success rate, using his sharp intellect, fluency in five languages, and a vast network of contacts worldwide. He has a tough body and determination to withstand any torture, and maintains a calm composure to gain trust.
Reiichi Kogure (小暮 蛉一, Kogure Reiichi)
Voiced by: Susumu Chiba (Japanese); Jay Hickman (English)
Yugo's partner and mechanic who provides technical support. Occasionally, he is called upon from Tokyo to travel to wherever Yugo is located.
Mayuko Iwase (岩瀬 繭子, Iwase Mayuko)
Voiced by: Yumi Kakazu (Japanese); Christine Auten (English)
Ahmad Rahmani (アーマド・ラフマニ, Āmado Rafumani)
Voiced by: Kenyu Horiuchi (Japanese); Guru Singh (English)
Laila (ライラ, Raira)
Voiced by: Yumi Kakazu (Japanese); Monica Rial (English)
Yusef Ali Mesa (ユスフ・アリ・メサ, Yusufu Ari Mesa)
Voiced by: Banjō Ginga (Japanese); Christopher Ayres (English)
Haji Rahmani (ハジ・ラフマニ, Haji Rafumani)
Voiced by: Masaaki Tsukada (Japanese); Marty Fleck (English)
Lall (ラル, Raru)
Voiced by: Hiroshi Yanaka (Japanese); Vic Mignogna (English)
Andrei Sergeivich Romonovski (アンドレイ・セルゲイビッチ・ロマノフスキー, Andorei Serugeibitchi Romanofusukī)
Voiced by: Ikuya Sawaki (Japanese); John Swasey^{Ep. 7 credits} (English)
Olga Elenova (オリガ・エレノワ, Origa Erenowa)
Voiced by: Michie Tomizawa (Japanese); Joanne Bonasso^{Ep. 7 credits} (English)
Lyuba (リューバ, Ryūba)
Voiced by: Akemi Okamura (Japanese); Christine Auten^{Ep. 8 credits} (English)
Mariko (真理子)
Voiced by: Yuki Kaida (Japanese); Nancy Novotny^{Ep. 7 credits} (English)
Major General Garrachova (ガラーホワ少将, Garāhowa Shōshō)
Voiced by: Jun Karasawa (Japanese); Marcy Rae^{Ep. 11 credits} (English)
Nadenka (ナージェンカ, Nājenka)
Voiced by: Yui Horie (Japanese); Luci Christian^{Ep. 7 credits} (English)

== Media ==
=== Manga ===
Written by Shinji Makari and illustrated by Shū Akana, Yugo was serialized in Kodansha's seinen manga magazine Monthly Afternoon from December 25, 1993, (Note: Debuted in the magazine's February 1994 issue, released on December 25, 1993.) to July 24, 2004. (Note: Finished in the magazine's September 2004 issue, released on July 24, 2004.) Its chapters were compiled into 22 tankōbon volumes and published in Kodansha's Afternoon KC line between June 23, 1994, and September 22, 2004. The volumes were republished in bunkobon format between February 10, 2004, and October 21, 2006, renamed and separated by story arc.

Just before the original series' conclusion, Yugo, with the subtitle "the Negotiator" added in, began serialization in Kodansha's seinen manga magazine Evening on January 27, 2004, in the fourth issue of that year. It finished serialization on November 10, 2015, in the twenty-third issue of that year. The first tankōbon volume was published on September 22, 2004, in the Evening KC line, with subsequent volumes published in the Evening KC Deluxe line. The nineteenth and final volume was published on December 22, 2015.

==== Volumes ====
No.	Release date	ISBN
1	June 23, 1994	978-4-06-314083-5
2	November 22, 1994	978-4-06-314097-2
3	April 21, 1995	978-4-06-314110-8
4	November 22, 1995	978-4-06-314122-1
5	May 23, 1996	978-4-06-314131-3
6	November 22, 1996	978-4-06-314142-9
7	April 23, 1997	978-4-06-314149-8
8	August 22, 1997	978-4-06-314162-7
9	March 23, 1998	978-4-06-314171-9
10	August 21, 1998	978-4-06-314184-9
11	January 22, 1999	978-4-06-314195-5
12	July 22, 1999	978-4-06-314213-6
13	December 16, 1999	978-4-06-314223-5
14	May 24, 2000	978-4-06-314241-9
15	November 22, 2000	978-4-06-314253-2
16	April 23, 2001	978-4-06-314264-8
17	September 21, 2001	978-4-06-314273-0
18	April 23, 2002	978-4-06-314288-4
19	August 23, 2002	978-4-06-314302-7
20	January 23, 2003	978-4-06-314313-3
21	May 23, 2003	978-4-06-314320-1
22	September 22, 2004	978-4-06-314355-3

==== Yugo the Negotiator volumes ====
No.	Title	Release date	ISBN
1	In Shimokita Peninsula; Shimokita Hantō-hen (下北半島編)	September 22, 2004	978-4-06-352085-9
2	In Tsushima, Kitakyushu; Kitakyūshū Tsushima-hen (北九州・対馬編)	May 23, 2005	978-4-06-372013-6
3	In Tokyo - Tanegashima; Tōkyō Tanegashima-hen (東京・種子島編)	March 23, 2006	978-4-06-372133-1
4	In Osaka (1); Ōsaka-hen (1) (大阪編 (1))	October 23, 2006	978-4-06-372219-2
5	In Osaka (2); Ōsaka-hen (2) (大阪編 (2))	February 23, 2007	978-4-06-372263-5
6	In Yokohama - Yokosuka (1); Yokohama Yokosuka-hen (1) (横浜・横須賀編 (1))	January 23, 2008	978-4-06-372381-6
7	In Yokohama - Yokosuka (2); Yokohama Yokosuka-hen (2) (横浜・横須賀編 (2))	February 22, 2008	978-4-06-375418-6
8	In Toyako Summit (1); Tōyako Samitto-hen (1) (洞爺湖サミット編 (1))	September 22, 2008	978-4-06-375559-6
9	In Toyako Summit (2); Tōyako Samitto-hen (2) (洞爺湖サミット編 (2))	May 22, 2009	978-4-06-375679-1
10	In Philippines ODA (1); Firipin ODA-hen (1) (フィリピンODA編 (1))	February 23, 2010	978-4-06-375877-1
11	In Philippines ODA (2); Firipin ODA-hen (2) (フィリピンODA編 (2))	April 23, 2010	978-4-06-375909-9
12	In Philippines ODA (3); Firipin ODA-hen (3) (フィリピンODA編 (3))	August 23, 2010	978-4-06-375931-0
13	In Taiwan (1); Taiwan-hen (1) (台湾編 (1))	June 23, 2011	978-4-06-376081-1
14	In Taiwan (2); Taiwan-hen (2) (台湾編 (2))	October 21, 2011	978-4-06-376138-2
15	In Taiwan (3); Taiwan-hen (3) (台湾編 (3))	November 22, 2012	978-4-06-376197-9
16	In Taiwan (4); Taiwan-hen (4) (台湾編 (4))	February 22, 2013	978-4-06-376786-5
17	Final (1); Final (1)	April 23, 2015	978-4-06-377179-4
18	Final (2); Final (2)	October 23, 2015	978-4-06-377317-0
19	Final (3); Final (3)	December 22, 2015	978-4-06-377381-1

=== Novel ===
A novelization written by Shinji Makari, depicting the Russia arc in Yugo along with a new story depicting Yugo Beppu's first negotiation, was published by Kodansha under the title Yugo the Negotiator in Russia & India (勇午 交渉人inロシア&インディア, Yugo: Kōshōnin in Roshia & India). It was released on May 14, 1999.

=== Anime ===
In November 2003, it was announced that a 13-episode anime adaptation titled Yugo the Negotiator (勇午 ～交渉人～, Yūgo: Kōshōnin) would release next February, adapting the manga's first two major story arcs: 1st Negotiation, or Pakistan Chapter (パキスタン編, Pakisutan-hen), comprised the former six episodes; 2nd Negotiation, or Russia Chapter (ロシア編, Roshia-hen), comprised the latter seven episodes. G&G Direction produced the 1st Negotiation, with Seiji Kishi as director, Takehiko Matsumoto as character designer, and Kazuharu Sato as writer. Artland produced the 2nd Negotiation, with Shinya Hanai as director, Kenichi Imaizumi as character designer, and Kenichi Kanemaki as writer. It was originally broadcast on Kids Station from February 25 to May 26, 2004. (Note: Yugo the Negotiator aired on Tuesday midnight, effectively Wednesday at 12:00 a.m. JST.) The opening theme is "Modern Size", and the ending theme is "Kitty", both by Eiichiro Taruki.

Six DVD volumes were released from May 25 to October 29, 2004, by Ken Media. ADV Films licensed the series for a North American release in March 2005, releasing the first volume in both a regular edition and an edition with a box on July 26. After releasing the last volume on March 21, 2006, ADV released the complete series in a DVD box set on October 2, 2007, and on March 24, 2009. The first three episodes of Yugo the Negotiator were screened at the Barbican Centre on February 26, 2008, in London; Helen McCarthy, an anime expert, did an introduction of the show for the audience.

==== 1st Negotiation episodes ====
No.	Title	Directed by	Written by	Storyboarded by	Original release date
1	"Negotiator"; Transliteration: "Kōshōnin" (Japanese: 交渉人)	Toyoaki Nakajima Seiji Kishi	Kazuharu Sato	Seiji Kishi	February 25, 2004
2	"Decision"; Transliteration: "Ketsui" (Japanese: 決意)	Akechi Daigoro Seiji Kishi	Kazuharu Sato	Toyoaki Nakajima	March 3, 2004
3	"Contact"; Transliteration: "Sesshoku" (Japanese: 接触)	Yukio Suzuki	Kazuharu Sato	Yoshiaki Okumura	March 10, 2004
4	"Warrior"; Transliteration: "Yūsha" (Japanese: 勇者)	Yoshiyuki Asai	Kazuharu Sato	Yukio Suzuki	March 17, 2004
5	"Trust"; Transliteration: "Shinrai" (Japanese: 信頼)	Yukio Suzuki	Kazuharu Sato	Yoshiaki Okumura	March 24, 2004
6	"Promise"; Transliteration: "Yakusoku" (Japanese: 約束)	Yoshiyuki Asai Seiji Kishi	Kazuharu Sato	Yoshiyuki Asai	April 4, 2004 (Note: Aired on Saturday midnight, effectively Sunday at 12:00 a.m. JST.)

==== 2nd Negotiation episodes ====
No.	Title	Directed by	Written by	Storyboarded by	Original release date
7	"Exiled Aristocrat"; Transliteration: "Bōmei Kizoku" (Japanese: 亡命貴族)	Shinya Hanai	Kenichi Kanemaki	Takuo Suzuki Kenichi Imaizumi	April 14, 2004
8	"Deal"; Transliteration: "Torihiki" (Japanese: 取引)	Shinya Hanai	Katsuhiko Takayama	Hiroshi Hara	April 21, 2004
9	"Official Documents"; Transliteration: "Kōbunsho" (Japanese: 公文書)	Tatsuyuki Nagai	Shōichi Satō	Tatsuyuki Nagai	April 28, 2004
10	"Extreme Cold"; Transliteration: "Marōsu (Gokkan)" (Japanese: マロース (極寒))	Yasuo Ejima Kenichi Imaizumi	Katsuhiko Takayama	Hiroshi Hara	May 5, 2004
11	"Interrogation"; Transliteration: "Jinmon" (Japanese: 尋問)	Takeyuki Sadohara	Katsuhiko Takayama	Hiroshi Hara	May 12, 2004
12	"The Mystery of the Ring"; Transliteration: "Yubiwa no Nazo" (Japanese: 指輪の謎)	Hiroshi Hara	Shōichi Satō	Hiroshi Hara	May 19, 2004
13	"For Nadenka"; Transliteration: "Nājenka no Tame ni" (Japanese: ナージェンカのために)	Tatsuyuki Nagai	Katsuhiko Takayama	Yoshimitsu Ōhashi	May 26, 2004

== Reception ==
Theron Martin from Anime News Network elected the main character of the series Yugo Beppu as the "Best New Hero/Heroine" along with Kei Kurono of Gantz and Pacifica of Scrapped Princess. Martin declared he is "the most original hero: he deals with 'opponents' though his attention to understanding them and the sometimes-extreme actions he undertakes so that he can negotiate with them on their terms. A very slick, and very tough, individual."

== See also ==
- Issak, another manga series written by Shinji Makari
