= Hiroshi Takashige =

Japanese manga artist

- Occupation: Manga writer
- Known for: Spriggan, Until Death Do Us Part

Hiroshi Takashige (たかしげ 宙, Takashige Hiroshi) is a Japanese manga writer best known in various manga communities in Japan and overseas for his work on Spriggan and later in Until Death Do Us Part.

== Biography ==
In 1996, he was a guest of honor with fellow Spriggan collaborator Ryōji Minagawa in a comic convention in Portugal. The two then worked on Kyo.

He became obscure from the manga community after his work in Spriggan was completed, though he resurfaced in 1998 to lend a hand in the creation of the Spriggan movie. He had recently been involved in doing Alcbane, Kurando and Until Death Do Us Part.

== Works ==
- Alcbane: Story
- Kurando: Story
- Kyō: Story
- Until Death Do Us Part: Story
- Spriggan: Story
