= Area D: Inō Ryōiki =

Japanese manga series

- First tankōbon volume cover

AREA D 異能領域 (Eria Dī Inō Ryōiki)
- Genre: Action, survival
- Manga
- Written by: Kyōichi Nanatsuki
- Illustrated by: Yang Kyung-il
- Published by: Shogakukan
- Imprint: Shōnen Sunday Comics Special
- Magazine: Weekly Shōnen Sunday
- Original run: March 14, 2012 – January 20, 2016
- Volumes: 14
- icon

Area D: Inō Ryōiki (Japanese: AREA D 異能領域, Hepburn: Eria Dī Inō Ryōiki) is a Japanese manga series written by Kyōichi Nanatsuki and illustrated by Yang Kyung-il. It was serialized in Shogakukan's Weekly Shōnen Sunday magazine from March 2012 to January 2016. Shogakukan collected the chapters in fourteen tankōbon volumes.

== Plot ==
Altered are humans who possess supernatural abilities, each wielding a unique power. Feared and persecuted by society, they emerged twelve years ago after the supernova explosion of Antares. Following the Renge Incident—a devastating terrorist attack blamed on Altered—they are imprisoned on the secret penal colony Area D. Area D operates under harsh laws: three violations mean execution. While some inmates form factions and thrive, the island is a lawless battleground. Most Altered are forcibly detained, though a few, like Jin Kazaragi, enter willingly. Jin is accused of orchestrating the Renge Incident, which killed thousands, including loved ones of many Altered. His refusal to deny involvement fuels hatred against him. The conflict between humans and Altered grows ever more volatile.

== Publication ==
Written by Kyōichi Nanatsuki and illustrated by Yang Kyung-il, Area D was serialized in Shogakukan's Weekly Shōnen Sunday from March 14, 2012, to January 20, 2016. Shogakukan collected its chapters in fourteen tankōbon volumes, released from August 17, 2012, to February 18, 2016.

=== Volumes ===
No.	Release date	ISBN
1	August 17, 2012	978-4-09-123857-3
2	August 17, 2012	978-4-09-123858-0
3	December 18, 2012	978-4-09-124166-5
4	April 18, 2013	978-4-09-124331-7
5	August 16, 2013	978-4-09-124413-0
6	December 18, 2013	978-4-09-124546-5
7	April 18, 2014	978-4-09-124690-5
8	August 18, 2014	978-4-09-125238-8
9	November 18, 2014	978-4-09-125528-0
10	February 18, 2015	978-4-09-125716-1
11	May 18, 2015	978-4-09-126117-5
12	August 18, 2015	978-4-09-126284-4
13	November 18, 2015	978-4-09-126619-4
14	February 18, 2016	978-4-09-127017-7

== See also ==
- Project ARMS, another manga series written by Nanatsuki
- Tantei Xeno to Nanatsu no Satsujin Misshitsu, another manga series written by Nanatsuki
