= Project ARMS =

Japanese manga series

- First tankōbon volume cover, featuring Ryo Takatsuki
- Genre: Action; Cyberpunk
- Manga
- Written by: Kyoichi Nanatsuki
- Illustrated by: Ryōji Minagawa
- Published by: Shogakukan
- English publisher: NA: Viz Media
- Imprint: Shōnen Sunday Comics Special
- Magazine: Weekly Shōnen Sunday
- Original run: March 16, 1997 – April 17, 2002
- Volumes: 22
- Anime television series
- Directed by: Hirotoshi Takaya (1–26); Hajime Kamegaki (27–52)
- Produced by: Fukashi Azuma; Masahito Yoshioka
- Written by: Aya Yoshinaga
- Music by: Daisuke Ikeda
- Studio: TMS Entertainment
- Licensed by: NA: Discotek Media
- Original network: TV Tokyo
- Original run: April 7, 2001 – March 30, 2002
- Episodes: 52
- icon

Project ARMS, simply known in Japan as ARMS, is a Japanese manga series written by Kyoichi Nanatsuki and illustrated by Ryoji Minagawa. It was serialized in Shogakukan's Weekly Shōnen Sunday from March 1997 to April 2002, with its chapters collected in 22 tankōbon volumes. The story follows Ryo Takatsuki, Hayato Shingu, Takeshi Tomoe and Kei Kuruma, four teens who discover that their bodies have been genetically engineered. Despite their differences, they team up and search for answers, leading them to confront an organization called the Egrigori, responsible for the nanomachine technology implanted in their bodies.

It was adapted into a 52-episode anime television series produced by TMS Entertainment and broadcast on TV Tokyo from April 2001 to March 2002. In North America, both the manga and the anime series were licensed by Viz Media. The anime was re-licensed by Discotek Media in 2017.

The manga has had over 15 million copies in circulation. In 1999, Project ARMS received the 44th Shogakukan Manga Award for the shōnen category.

== Plot ==
The story follows a young man named Ryo Takatsuki, who at the beginning of the series believes that he was in an accident causing his right arm to be severed from his body. However, as the story progresses, it is revealed that he was actually a test subject for experiments involving genetics and an "ARMS" nanomachine implant, along with three other youths: Hayato Shingu, Takeshi Tomoe and Kei Kuruma. They all meet under strange circumstances and after many battles they set off on a journey to rescue Ryo's girlfriend Katsumi Akagi, who is kidnapped by the Egrigori, an immense organization founded by Keith White and Doctor Samuel Tillinghast, that operates in the shadows and has bases, research facilities, and agents all over the world, and are the creators of the ARMS technology.

== Characters ==
=== Main characters ===
Ryo Takatsuki (高槻 涼, Takatsuki Ryō)
Voiced by: Nobutoshi Kanna (Japanese); Kirby Morrow (English)
Ryo is a polite yet exceptionally capable teenager trained covertly by his mercenary parents, Iwao and Misa Takatsuki, to combat Egrigori. A skilled strategist and martial artist, he demonstrates calm analytical thinking in combat situations while valuing human life above all. Though reluctant to kill, he will do so when necessary. He maintains a deep bond with childhood friend Katsumi, whom he eventually marries; their child appears to be the reincarnation of the redeemed Black Alice.
Hayato Shingu (新宮 隼人, Shingū Hayato)
Voiced by: Shin-ichiro Miki (Japanese); Brian Drummond (English)
Hayato is an impulsive yet justice-driven individual whose traumatic childhood shapes his worldview. At age seven, he witnesses Egrigori destroy his village and Keith Black murder his parents while severing his left arm, later replaced by the White Knight ARMS unit. Raised by grandfather Juzo, he masters Shingu martial arts while obsessively pursuing vengeance against Egrigori. Through his alliance with Ryo's team, he develops emotional control and compassion, unlocking the 'Heart of Water' technique to defeat opponents like Kou Karunagi. This transformation culminates in abandoning revenge to become a protector, accessing his ARMS' ultimate form. His relationship with Kei evolves throughout these events, continuing into the epilogue.
Takeshi Tomoe (巴 武士, Tomoe Takeshi)
Voiced by: Yūji Ueda (Japanese); Brad Swaile (English)
Takeshi initially appears as an unlikely ARMS subject—an intelligent but timid teenager frequently bullied at school. His social isolation and self-loathing trigger his ARMS activation. Through joining Ryo's team, he develops courage and loyalty, fighting to protect his newfound friends and family. His exceptional reflexes complement his ARMS abilities. After sustaining severe injuries from Kou Karunagi, Takeshi enters a dormant state within White Rabbit, communicating with Alice during the Carillon Tower conflict. When offered enhanced power by White Alice, he instead chooses to free her from isolation. Their combined forces merge with Jabberwock, enabling White Alice to confront her darker half directly.
Kei Kuruma (久留間 恵, Kuruma Kei)
Voiced by: Minami Takayama (Japanese); Nicole Oliver (English)
Kei is the sole female ARMS team member, having been raised since childhood by the Bluemen organization as a genetically-enhanced soldier. Unlike other subjects, she possesses full awareness of her ARMS abilities from inception. The Bluemen's dehumanizing treatment fosters profound isolation and aggression, traits that gradually soften through her bond with Ryo's team. These relationships teach her genuine camaraderie, while her growing connection with Hayato develops into a lasting romantic partnership by the series' conclusion.
Katsumi Akagi (赤木 カツミ, Katsumi Akagi)
Voiced by: Tomoko Miura (Japanese); Venus Terzo (English)
Katsumi, Ryo's childhood friend and neighbor, possesses strong compassion and willpower. An unactivated ARMS-compatible embryo created by Egrigori, she shares physical resemblance with Kei. After Ryo's ARMS activation, she provides emotional support until Egrigori captures her. Though apparently killed when Keith White manipulates events to intercept Ryo's attack, she revives following Alice's demise. The epilogue reveals her marriage to Ryo and their child, who may be Black Alice's reincarnation.

=== ARMS ===
Alice (アリス, Arisu)
Voiced by: Aya Hisakawa (Japanese); Tabitha St. Germain (English)
Alice is Egrigori's supreme power and creator of the ARMS system. A child prodigy who communicated with the entity Azazel, she sympathized with Egrigori's child test subjects. After a failed escape attempt at age ten, she witnesses their massacre and merges with Azazel while mortally wounded, forming the Alice supercomputer and the four ARMS cores. This fusion splits her psyche into "White Alice" (her compassion) and "Black Alice" (her rage). While White Alice self-destructs, Black Alice survives through contact with Katsumi, later manifesting as the Bandersnatch before Ryo defeats her. Redeemed by human kindness, she is reborn as Ryo and Katsumi's fully human daughter.
The Jabberwock (ジャバウォック, Jabauokku)
Voiced by: Shūichi Ikeda (Japanese); Paul Dobson (English)
Jabberwock represents the most formidable original ARMS, characterized by rapid adaptive evolution and an unstable, violent artificial intelligence embodying Black Alice's hatred. Initially manifesting as Ryo's enhanced right arm with autonomous defensive capabilities, it later achieves complete synchronization through their mutual anger. The unit grants accelerated healing and transforms into its ultimate state—a rage-fueled crimson humanoid—when activated by extreme hostility.
The White Knight (ナイト, Naito)
Voiced by: Jūrōta Kosugi (Japanese); Michael Dobson (English)
White Knight, Hayato's ARMS unit, manifests in his left arm as White Alice's protective will. It generates hardened combat blades and projectile launchers, with effectiveness tied to Hayato's emotional state. The unit grants accelerated healing and features multiple transformations: a half-transformed state enhancing all physical attributes, and an ultimate armored knight form activated by protective instincts. This final wields the "Lance of Mistilteinn", an anti-ARMS weapon projecting a disabling energy field. Designed as a failsafe against Jabberwock, White Knight's destructive potential creates moral conflict for Hayato regarding Ryo.
The White Rabbit (ホワイトラビット, Howaito Rabitto)
Voiced by: Kōji Nakata (Japanese); Brian Dobson (English)
White Rabbit, Takeshi's ARMS unit, manifests in his legs as White Alice's innocence. It grants superhuman speed, agility, and reflexes, enabling supersonic flight and devastating kinetic attacks. The unit's nano-machines accelerate healing and allow mid-air maneuvers surpassing Egrigori's advanced cyborgs. Its ultimate winged form achieves near-light speeds, generating destructive shockwaves and energy pulses. Like White Knight, White Rabbit serves as a contingency against Jabberwock's rampages. The ARMS' capabilities scale with Takeshi's selflessness and belief in his potential.
The Queen of Hearts (クイーン・オブ・ハート, Kuīn obu Hāto)
Voiced by: Nana Yamaguchi (Japanese); Alison Matthews (English)
Queen of Hearts, Kei's ARMS unit, manifests in her eyes as Alice's scientific objectivity. Unlike other ARMS, it remains unaligned with either Alice persona, functioning instead as an impartial judge. The unit provides advanced sensory capabilities including predictive analysis of attacks and control over teammates' ARMS activation. Its nano-machines accelerate healing, which Kei affectionately calls her "nano-babies". The ultimate form appears as a luminous feminine figure, unlocked by answering "Do you want Light?" rather than seeking power. This form demonstrates undefined but formidable abilities including: neutralizing rogue ARMS units, generating the impenetrable 'Mirror of Aegis' defense, and theoretically destroying all ARMS systems at the cost of their hosts' lives. During the Bandersnatch confrontation, the unit reveals White Alice's visage, likely resulting from Jabberwock's prior activation.
The Bandersnatch (バンダースナッチ, Bandāsunatchi)
Bandersnatch emerges when a dying Black Alice implants an ARMS core in Katsumi during their brief contact. This manifests through disturbing nightmares and behavioral instability, culminating in violent outbursts and eventual possession. Its ultimate form mirrors Jabberwock's appearance in white, wielding nitrogen-based cryokinetic abilities rather than anti-matter manipulation. The unit achieves absolute zero temperatures across urban-scale areas, with the freezing effects dynamically responding to its movements and intentions. The cold manifests as a living extension of the ARMS unit, concentrating its most severe effects around the host.

== Media ==
=== Manga ===
Project ARMS, written by Kyoichi Nanatsuki and illustrated by Ryōji Minagawa, was serialized in Shogakukan's shōnen manga magazine Weekly Shōnen Sunday from March 16, 1997, (Note: It started in the magazine's 16th issue of 1997 (cover date April 2), released on March 16 of that same year.) to April 17, 2002. (Note: It finished in the magazine's 20th issue of 2002 (cover date May 1), released on April 17 of that same year.) Shogakukan collected its chapters in 22 tankōbon volumes, published between October 18, 1997, and June 18, 2002.

In North America, Viz Media licensed the manga in 2002, and published the 22 volumes from May 1, 2003, to May 12, 2009.

==== Volumes ====
No.	Original release date	Original ISBN	English release date	English ISBN
1	October 18, 1997	4-09-124881-0	May 1, 2003	1-56931-889-1
2	January 17, 1998	4-09-124882-9	October 1, 2003	1-59116-058-8
3	March 18, 1998	4-09-124883-7	December 31, 2003	1-59116-101-0
4	June 18, 1998	4-09-124884-5	March 31, 2004	1-59116-165-7
5	September 18, 1998	4-09-124885-3	July 7, 2004	1-59116-338-2
6	December 10, 1998	4-09-124886-1	October 12, 2004	1-59116-488-5
7	March 18, 1999	4-09-124887-X	January 11, 2005	1-59116-522-9
8	June 16, 1999	4-09-124888-8	April 12, 2005	1-59116-732-9
9	August 7, 1999	4-09-124889-6	July 12, 2005	1-59116-733-7
10	November 18, 1999	4-09-124890-X	October 11, 2005	1-4215-0073-6
11	February 18, 2000	4-09-124891-8	January 10, 2006	1-4215-0194-5
12	May 18, 2000	4-09-124892-6	April 11, 2006	1-4215-0386-7
13	July 18, 2000	4-09-124893-4	July 11, 2006	1-4215-0502-9
14	October 18, 2000	4-09-124894-2	October 10, 2006	1-4215-0503-7
15	December 18, 2000	4-09-124895-0	January 9, 2007	1-4215-0504-5
16	March 17, 2001	4-09-124896-9	May 8, 2007	1-4215-0916-4
17	May 18, 2001	4-09-124897-7	September 11, 2007	1-4215-0917-2
18	July 18, 2001	4-09-124898-5	January 8, 2008	1-4215-0918-0
19	October 18, 2001	4-09-124899-3	May 13, 2008	1-4215-1697-7
20	January 18, 2002	4-09-126750-5	September 9, 2008	1-4215-1698-5
21	March 18, 2002	4-09-126821-8	January 13, 2009	1-4215-1699-3
22	June 18, 2002	4-09-126822-6	May 12, 2009	1-4215-1700-0

=== Anime ===
A 52-episode anime television series adaptation produced by TMS Entertainment was broadcast on TV Tokyo. The first season was broadcast from April 7 to September 29, 2001; the second season, known as The 2nd Chapter, was broadcast from October 6, 2001, to March 30, 2002. The first two opening themes are "FreeBird" and "Breath on Me" performed by New Cinema Tokage, and the two ending themes "Just Wanna Be" by Wag and "Call my Name" by Garnet Crow. The second season opening theme is "Time Waits for No One" by Wag, while the first ending theme is "Timeless Sleep" by Garnet Crow, and the second ending theme is "Owaranai Yume no Nakade" (終わらない夢の中で, lit. 'The Never Ending Dream') by Project Arms.

In North American Viz Media licensed the series in 2002. The first season was released on nine DVD volumes from October 8, 2002, to May 4, 2004; The 2nd Chapter was released on seven DVD volumes from August 24, 2004, to November 15, 2005. Discotek Media announced during their Otakon 2017 panel that they had acquired the series.

==== Episodes ====
===== Season 1 =====
No. overall	No. in season	Title	Original release date
1	1	"Vibrations" "Kyōshin (baiburēshon)" (共振（バイブレーション）)	April 7, 2001
Ryo Takatsuki underwent surgery in the past after surviving a horrific accident which severely damaged his right arm. In the present, a brood of baby white-tailed swifts is seen nesting on the school building. Katsumi Akagi is surprised that Ryo's right arm can heal quickly. Shown with a seemingly injured left arm, Hayato Shingu gives a shocking first impression when he transfers to Ryo's class. After defeating a bully named Goto on the school rooftop, Hayato picks a fight with Ryo. Hayato briefly reveals that his left arm is made from the ARMS technology before departing abruptly. After returning to his apartment, Ryo is informed by his mother Misa that Katsumi might have gone missing. At night, Ryo sets up booby traps at a park, where he has a run-in with a group of former military soldiers. Hayato later lures Ryo to an abandoned building by temporarily capturing Katsumi, who then leaves after calling Ryo a pushover for planning to talk things out with Hayato. Mistaking Ryo as a member of the Egrigori, creator of the ARMS technology, Hayato fully transforms his ARMS named the White Knight. Katsumi is soon taken hostage by a member of the Egrigori named Claw.
2	2	"Trance" "Hatsudō (toransu)" (発動（トランス）)	April 14, 2001
Claw reveals that Ryo is the same kin as Hayato. As Katsumi frees herself from Claw's clutches, Hayato stands up to Claw, while Ryo and Katsumi find out that the police has surrounded the building. With Hayato nearly defeated, Ryo throws a spear at Claw, who angrily chases after Ryo. Falling victim to several booby traps set up by Ryo, Claw attempts to hurt Katsumi after rendering her unconscious. Ryo finally activates his ARMS named the Jabberwock, which autonomously flings Claw into the ground. As Katsumi regains consciousness, Hayato appraises Ryo for activating his ARMS, knowing that his life will never be the same. Claw reveals that there are a total of four teens with the ARMS technology who exist. As the police raid the building, Ryo, Katsumi and Hayato make their escape. The next day, Ryo and Katsumi learn that Hayato's village friends and family were killed by the Egrigori ten years ago, in which his father was killed by a man named "Keith". Hayato explains that the ARMS technology is made up of nanomachines. As Ryo desires to find the two other teens with ARMS technology, he declares that Hayato is his comrade in arms.
3	3	"Nightmare" "Akumu (naitomea)" (悪夢（ナイトメア）)	April 21, 2001
Both Ryo and Hayato sense that there might be another teen with ARMS technology at the school. Ryo, Hayato and Katsumi hear about another transfer student named Takeshi Tomoe. Takeshi's younger sister Maya bravely stands up to Goto when he picks on Takeshi. Out of rage, Takeshi activates his ARMS from his legs named the White Rabbit, but Ryo and Hayato prevent Takeshi from attacking Goto. As Ryo and Takeshi both lose control of their ARMS, Hayato advises Ryo to contact his ARMS without fearing it, which allows Ryo to deflect Takeshi and subdue him. While Takeshi is hospitalized, Ryo, Hayato and Katsumi learn that Takeshi survived a traffic collision while playing catch with Maya ten years ago. After explaining that the teens with ARMS technology are being targeted by the Egrigori, Ryo encourages Takeshi to join him, but Takeshi declines the offer and walks away. Later on, child prodigy twins Jeff and Al Bowen capture Maya as bait to lure Takeshi.
4	4	"Intercept" "Geigeki (intāseputo)" (迎撃（インターセプト）)	April 28, 2001
Jeff and Al send letters to Ryo, Hayato and Takeshi about Maya being kidnapped somewhere in the school. Takeshi is nonchalant about this, revealing that Maya is not related to him by blood. Katsumi, Hayato and Ryo each tell Takeshi not to blame Maya for his trauma. After causing all the light fixtures to shatter from the ceiling, Jeff and Al force all the students and teachers to evacuate from their classrooms, only to block the emergency exit. Ryo and Hayato rush down the main stairwell, finding two cardboard boxes containing bombs. As the students and teachers make their way to the front entrance, Ryo and Hayato run outside in time and chuck the cardboard boxes into the sky. There are no casualties when Jeff and Al eventually detonate the bombs. Thinking back at what he was told earlier, Takeshi runs off to find Maya. When Ryo and Hayato make their way to the school rooftop, they are attacked by Jeff and Al's combat cyborgs named Plus and Minus. However, Takeshi comes to the rescue at the last minute.
5	5	"Counterattack" "Hangeki (kauntāatakku)" (反撃（カウンターアタック）)	May 5, 2001
Upon realizing that Plus and Minus have an unconscious Maya in tow, Ryo, Hayato and Takeshi retreat by jumping out of the school window from the top floor. Meanwhile, Jeff and Al discuss how the ARMS technology can evolve within the human body. The White Knight is out of commission for awhile until Hayato fully recovers. Ryo, Hayato and Takeshi later lure Plus and Minus to the art room and split up in separate compartments. Ryo and Hayato manage to distract Plus and Minus, using a fire extinguisher to create a smokescreen, while Takeshi manages to save Maya. After luring Plus and Minus to the home economics room, Ryo, Hayato and Takeshi use flour to create a dust explosion. However, not even this could stop Plus and Minus from meeting their demise. Plus kidnaps Maya again, while Minus crushes Ryo under a storage cabinet, which greatly worries Hayato.
6	6	"Flash" "Shungeki (furasshu)" (瞬撃（フラッシュ）)	May 12, 2001
Al controlling Minus watches as Jeff controlling Plus is provoked into attacking Hayato. Trapped under the storage cabinet, Ryo transforms the Jabberwock into a laser cannon, finally destroying Plus with a blast. Minus then retreats with Maya in tow. Takeshi believes that he is helpless to rescue Maya, though Ryo and Hayato do not give up trying. After Takeshi finds a discarded surveillance camera, he finds out that Jeff and Al are using a backup generator in the equipment room next to the gym. Ryo, Hayato and Takeshi encounter Al waiting for them at the gym. After releasing Maya to Takeshi, Al explains that he wanted revenge for being bullied in high school because of his intelligence. Ryo is then shot by Jeff hiding in the equipment room, but the Jabberwock protects Ryo from dying. When a top secret agent from the Egrigori named Keith Red suddenly arrives at the gym via helicopter, Hayato recognizes Red as the one who murder his father. After easily defeating Hayato with one smack, Red proceeds to get rid of Jeff and Al, while Ryo realizes that the Jabberwock is trembling with fear.
7	7	"Trust" "Kyōtō (torasuto)" (共闘（トラスト）)	May 19, 2001
Red effortlessly destroys Minus before killing Jeff, but an empathetic Takeshi intervenes before Red prepares to kill Al. Instead, Red decides to spare Al's life before departing, suggesting that Hayato should visit his home village called Abumisawa in order to learn the truth about the creation of the ARMS technology. Harboring Al in his apartment, Ryo declares a truce, seeing that Al is now targeted by the Egrigori. When Ryo, Hayato and Katsumi hang out with Takeshi, Al decides to tag along in order to learn more about the ARMS technology and avenge Jeff's murder. The five of them visit Hayato's house, where Hayato's foster father Juzo Shingu lurks in the shadows. After Takeshi and Hayato fall victim to Juzo's booby traps, Ryo comes face-to-face with Juzo, who just wanted to grapple with Ryo. In the aftermath, Juzo encourages the five of them to explore Abumisawa for themselves. Ryo, Hayato, Takeshi and Al head towards Abumisawa by taking a train and then a bus, while Katsumi secretly follows them. However, the bus gets hijacked by a man, who then captures Katsumi.
8	8	"Stranger" "Ikyō (sutorenjā)" (異郷（ストレンジャー）)	May 26, 2001
Ryo, Hayato and Takeshi work together to rescue Katsumi from the man. Upon arriving at Abumisawa, Hayato notices that the townspeople do not look so welcoming. The five of them decide to stay overnight at Hayato's derelict house. While collecting dry wood and maitake in the forest, Ryo fears that the Jabberwock would put Katsumi in grave danger. At night, Hayato becomes distraught when he cannot find what he buried ten years ago. Al mentions that there has been no sign of children in Abumisawa. Ryo is startled when the Jabberwock starts to speak to him. Meanwhile, a detective named Koichi Kabuto searches for Ryo, Hayato and Takeshi even though the unsolved case involving the school incident is closed. A mob of mind-controlled townspeople raid Hayato's derelict house with torches, prompting the Jabberwock to fight back against Ryo's pleas. Making their escape, Ryo, Takeshi and Hayato reluctantly part ways with Katsumi and Al deep in the forest. Ryo, Hayato and Takeshi are then confronted by Gashure, Wasp and Face, three cyborg siblings who are nicknamed the Crimson Triad.
9	9	"Illusion" "Makyō (iryūjon)" (魔境（イリュージョン）)	June 2, 2001
Al tells Katsumi about the unique abilities of the Crimson Triad, making them unstoppable killing machines. Koichi continues searching for Ryo, Hayato and Takeshi, while Katsumi and Al stay hidden from the townspeople. Ryo, Hayato and Takeshi each manage to discover the weaknesses of the Crimson Triad. Witnessed by Koichi, Ryo transforms the Jabberwock into a laser cannon, which blasts Gashure off a cliff. Defeated at the creek below, Gashure fires a flare as a signal, ordering Wasp and Face to retreat. As Ryo, Hayato, Takeshi, Katsumi, Al and Koichi make their way back, they realize that the townspeople have set up a perimeter. Koichi then deduces that the townspeople are wanted criminals, while Al notes that the townspeople have a microchip implanted in their cerebellums. Moreover, there must be a way to disrupt the mind-controlling signal, which is coming from the town church bell. While Katsumi, Al and Koichi stay behind, Ryo, Hayato and Takeshi head towards the church, where they encounter the Crimson Triad yet again.
10	10	"Jabberwock" "Majū (jabau~okku)" (魔獣（ジャバウォック）)	June 9, 2001
In an underground research laboratory, scientist Yamano learns that head scientist Mary Katz downloaded classified data from the Abumisawa Experiment. Deep in the forest, Ryo, Hayato and Takeshi are soon overpowered by the Crimson Triad. Meanwhile, Katsumi, Al and Koichi wait for Ryo, Hayato and Takeshi to return. Ryo, Hayato and Takeshi are reminded of their loved ones, prompting them to turn the tables and defeat the Crimson Triad before briefly reuniting with Katsumi, Al and Koichi. Upon arriving back at the church, the six of them meet Mary, who grants them clearance to the underground research laboratory in order to learn the truth about the ARMS technology. After Yamano contacts the Egrigori headquarters, Red leads an emergency operation to shut down the Abumisawa Experiment.
11	11	"Evolution" "Kakusei (evu~oryūshon)" (覚醒（エヴォリューション）)	June 16, 2001
Mary explains that the nemesis of the Egrigori called the Blue Men were responsible for successfully implanting the four teens with ARMS technology from birth, including Ryo, Hayato and Takeshi. Coincidentally, the project manager was Hayato's late father Shuichiro Shingu. Yanamo leaves as he warns Mary that the Egrigori troops are on their way to obliterate everything and everyone in Abumisawa. Many casualties occur as it is too late for the townspeople to evacuate. Ryo, Hayato and Takeshi agree to help Gashure and Wasp in the woods, not long before Katsumi shares a kiss with Ryo in the church. Ryo and Takeshi are unable to save Gashure and Wasp, while Hayato briefly relives his traumatic experience from ten years ago. Al and Koichi search for Ryo, Hayato and Takeshi in the woods, while Katsumi stays at the church and plays the organ. As Ryo rushes back to the church and reunites with Katsumi, the Egrigori troops detonate the church as their final target right behind Katsumi. The Jabberwock fully awakens, seeking revenge for Katsumi's apparent death.
12	12	"Beat" "Kodō (bīto)" (鼓動（ビート）)	June 23, 2001
Hayato, Takeshi, Al and Koichi watch in horror as the Jabberwock singlehandedly annihilates some of the Egrigori troops, forcing Red to call a retreat after experiencing a near miss. Later on, Ryo is plagued by the guilt of Katsumi's apparent death, choosing to lay low inside the abandoned building at his hometown of Aisora in the meantime, much to the worry of Hayato and Al. Ryo spirals out of control and ditches class, prompting Hayato and Takeshi to do something about this. Upon returning to the abandoned building, Ryo is ambushed by three Egrigori agents, but he harnesses the power of the Jabberwock to easily overwhelm his opponents. Hayato and Takeshi find Ryo on the rooftop of the abandoned building, managing to snap him out of it. Ryo later sits at the riverbank, noting that the Jabberwock is slowly taking over his soul. He is soon met by Kei Kuruma, who has a striking resemblance to Katsumi.
13	13	"Blue Men" "Soshiki (burūmen)" (組織（ブルーメン）)	June 30, 2001
Recognized as the fourth teen with ARMS technology and a member of the Blue Men, Kei challenges Hayato to a sparring match in a warehouse, proving to be formidable. Ryo realizes that Kei activates her ARMS from her eyes named the Queen of Hearts. Ryo riskily uses his left hand to prevent the Jabberwock from attacking Kei. Taking Ryo, Hayato and Takeshi to the Blue Men headquarters, Kei explains that the Blue Men formed an organization that dissented from the Egrigori. Ryo, Hayato and Takeshi are soon welcomed by chief operating officer Li Chunyan, who begrudgingly unveils that Katsumi was taken custody by the Egrigori a week ago. When the founder of the Blue Men traps Ryo, Hayato, Takeshi and Kei inside a corridor, he believes that they hold the key to the future of all mankind. Ryo takes control of his own fate and breaks through the secure door. By the evening, Hayato and Takeshi leave with Ryo during a downpour, while Kei stays behind at the Blue Men headquarters. Meanwhile, siblings Cliff and Yugo Gilbert, two members of an elite fighting unit called the X-Armis, search for Ryo after taking out some Egrigori cyborgs stationed at Aisora.
14	14	"Welcome Rain" "Jiu (uerukamurein)" (慈雨（ウエルカムレイン）)	July 7, 2001
Ryo, Hayato and Takeshi agree to meet again in three days. After recounting the devastating things that he learned in Abumisawa, Ryo ends up in tears when he is greeted by Misa upon arriving at his apartment. The next morning, Hayato and Al encounter Volf, while Takeshi encounters Carol. Ryo receives a distress call from Kei, who is then defeated by Kyklops. After several Egrigori cyborgs raid his apartment, Ryo is surprised when Misa defends herself using military tactics. Ryo and Misa are forced to jump off the veranda in order to make their escape. Hiding out in a playground, Misa reveals the truth about herself to Ryo. She was formerly a part of a special forces team prior to being assigned by the Blue Men to raise Ryo during his childhood. Suddenly, Yugo uses her telekinetic powers to communicate with Ryo while showing him that Hayato, Takeshi and Kei have been captured by Volf, Carol and Kyklops, the other members of the X-Armis. If Ryo wants to see his friends again, then he must go to the amusement park and activate the Jabberwock.
15	15	"Showtime" "Maen (shōtaimu)" (魔宴（ショータイム）)	July 14, 2001
At night, Ryo arrives at the amusement park, where Cliff and Yugo are waiting for him. Ryo is distraught upon learning that Hayato, Takeshi and Kei are shackled to various attractions. When Ryo prepares to rescue Hayato, Ryo finds himself in a tussle against Volf, who is a strongman with a healing ability. After executing an uppercut which paralyzes Volf's central nervous system, Ryo uses his agility to defeat Volf. On the roller coaster, Ryo is attacked by Kyklops, who is a skilled knife fighter equipped with oscillating blades. When Ryo retreats to a haunted attraction, he finds out that Kyklops has night vision and ocular blasts. After dodging and evading Kyklops, Ryo resists from having the Jabberwock fully awaken. Yugo advises Ryo to duck inside the house of mirrors, but an irritated Cliff notes to Yugo that he wants to go from being superhuman to inhuman. Ryo then figures out how to defeat Kyklops.
16	16	"Satan" "Maō (Seitan)" (魔王（セイタン）)	July 21, 2001
Pointing out to Kyklops that his ocular blasts are useless inside the house of mirrors, Ryo ends up defeating Kyklops despite trying to negotiate. Ryo is then forced to face Carol, who is a girl with powerful psychokinetic abilities that can bend anything with her mind. When Carol dislocates Ryo's bones, the Jabberwock attempts to fully awaken, but Ryo quickly regains control of his body. Soon enough, Ryo is able to withstand Carol's attacks. After Carol realizes that she was previously abandoned by her parents, Ryo decides to call a truce. An enraged Cliff uses his telepathic powers, causing the ground to quake until Carol shows empathy for Ryo. It is revealed that Cliff and Yugo were kept in a laboratory during their childhood, having been polar opposites in personality and development. When Cliff threatens to harm an unconscious Kei, Ryo rushes to save Kei in time before she gets impaled by a barrage of metal pipes into a wall. As Ryo relives the trauma of Katsumi's apparent death, Yugo starts to feel Ryo's agony. Exploiting Cliff for using his allies as pawns in a chess game, Ryo holds Kei in his arms as he declares that he will not lose against Cliff.
17	17	"Heaven" "Kōrin (hebun)" (降臨（ヘブン）)	July 28, 2001
Thanks to the Queen of Hearts, Kei guides Ryo to escape the wrath of Cliff by going underground, while Yugo shields Carol from the numerous quakes. Realizing that Kei does not work well with others due to her traumatic past, Ryo explains that he bonded with Hayato and Takeshi for sharing the same fate. Meanwhile, Al, Misa and Juzo rescue Hayato and Takeshi to a surveillance room behind Cliff's back. Refusing to listen to Ryo, Kei runs back to the amusement park, where Cliff immobilizes her and attacks her with a barrage of metal pipes. At the last minute, Ryo pushes Kei out of the way while simultaneously being impaled by a metal pipe in his torso. Cliff threatens to harm Kei in order to provoke the Jabberwock to fully awaken, but Yugo refuses to be involved in this. Instead, Cliff absorbs some of Yugo's powers in order to torment Ryo with his last moments with Katsumi, finally allowing the Jabberwock to fully awaken and remove the metal pipe. In the meantime, Misa rescues Kei, while Juzo rescues Carol. As Cliff wreaks havoc in the amusement park, the Jabberwock prepares to fight.
18	18	"Gehenna" "Gōka (gehena)" (業火（ゲヘナ）)	August 4, 2001
As Kei begins to understand what it means to rely on others, she crosses paths with Hayato and Takeshi, who soon explain that Ryo is like a brother to them. After enduring Cliff's attack at full force, the Jabberwock launches a counterattack, though Cliff tries to defend himself by emitting a psychic shield. Hayato, Takeshi and Kei find Yugo, who explains that she is unable to reach Ryo. However, Hayato, Takeshi and Kei still opt for Yugo to project their psyches within the subconscious of the Jabberwock. Once there, Hayato, Takeshi and Kei follow a pathway of blue flames leading to Ryo surrounded by an inferno. The Jabberwock prepares to kill Cliff and Yugo. Nonetheless, Ryo regains control of his will after confronting the Jabberwock within his subconscious, thanks to some encouraging words from Hayato, Takeshi and Kei. In the aftermath, Cliff and Yugo are left defeated but their lives are spared.
19	19	"Snark Hunt" "Kariba (sunākuhanto)" (狩場（スナークハント）)	August 11, 2001
At Juzo's house, the X-Armis are now in alliance with the four ARMS teens. Before departing on the road with the other members of the X-Armis, Yugo informs the four ARMS teens that the Egrigori headquarters is based in the United States. Kei soon learns that the Blue Men headquarters has been targeted, while Volf and Kyklops have been assassinated by Gauss Gall, who is the leader of the Red Caps, the elite fighting troops created by the Egrigori from the data that the X-Armis supplied. Ordering Yugo and Carol to retreat, Cliff decides to fight Gauss on his own. However, Red arrives and transforms his ARMS named Gryphon in order to eliminate Cliff. Meanwhile, Koichi arrives at Juzo's house looking for answers. Just then, Yugo and Carol rush to tell the others that Cliff has been defeated. Before he dies, Cliff entrusts Ryo to look after Yugo and Carol. After neutralizing all communications and destroying the eight bridges that link Aisora to the outside world, Gauss leads a "snark hunt" in the evening. Red notes that the Jabberwock gave scars on his face that did not fully heal, meaning that the Jabberwock may be the ultimate killing machine.
20	20	"Crisis" "Kiki (kuraishisu)" (危機（クライシス）)	August 18, 2001
The group is assigned into three battalions: Ryo, Yugo and Kei as the first; Hayato, Juzo, Al and Carol as the second; and Takeshi and Misa as the third. They all watch in horror when the Red Caps trap and annihilate innocent civilians in traffic. The Red Caps have taken over the city, as Gauss threatens to kill off the innocent bystanders if Ryo, Hayato, Takeshi, Kei, Al, Misa, Juzo, Yugo and Carol are not found by midnight. When Hayato comes out of hiding and exposes the White Knight, Gauss encourages the innocent bystanders to gang up on Hayato, who is momentarily saved by Al, Juzo and Carol. In an alleyway, Juzo consoles Hayato when the latter expresses remorse for what he did. As a bidding strategy, Hayato, Al, Juzo and Carol work together to fend off some members of the Red Caps in front of the innocent bystanders in the streets. Misa asks Takeshi to help her find a bomb located inside a tower block, but Takeshi initially does not have the confidence to do it.
21	21	"Wish" "Kibō (u~isshu)" (希望（ウィッシュ）)	August 25, 2001
Ryo, Kei and Yugo are left defenseless while hiding out in a playground. While Yugo looks after a distressed Kei, Ryo heads out to capture a member of the Red Caps. Takeshi and Misa confront Karl Higgins, a lieutenant of the Red Caps, in front of the tower block. Juzo gets shot in the left arm by a member of the Red Caps in the streets. As Misa ignites a photoflash bomb, Takeshi has the courage to assist her in taking on Karl's troops, causing Karl to retreat inside the tower block. When the innocent bystanders surround Hayato, Juzo, Al and Carol, Koichi suddenly shows up to end the riot. Thanks to a riveting speech, Koichi manages to persuade the innocent bystanders to attack the Red Caps. While Ryo risks his life to capture a member of the Red Caps, Kei learns that Yugo has unrequited love for Ryo. Despite all the hardships, Yugo believes that there is hope to get through just about anything. Misa and Takeshi infiltrate the tower block, while Koichi prepares to mobilize the police against the Red Caps.
22	22	"Knight" "Kishi (naito)" (騎士（ナイト）)	September 1, 2001
Takeshi and Misa bypass Karl's troops and head to the top floor. Hayato, Al, Juzo and Carol encounter Red. Ryo and Kei learn that Yugo has exhausted her telepathic powers. Misa tell Takeshi that he must disarm the bomb found on the roof. After fending off Karl's troops, Takeshi is faced against Karl on a helicopter. Red critically wounds Hayato, greatly worrying Al and Juzo. Even Carol's psychokinetic powers are useless against Red. While Juzo opts to fight Red on his own, Hayato has an internal struggle to survive, in which the White Knight fully awakens. The White Knight stabs Red in the blink of an eye, though Red quickly heals. Gryphon fully awakens and engages in an intense battle against the White Knight. When a little girl named Aya tries to reach for her dropped teddy bear, Hayato protects her from getting hurt by Red.
23	23	"White Rabbit" "Shirousagi (howaitorabitto)" (白兎（ホワイトラビット）)	September 8, 2001
There are only two more hours left until the clock strikes midnight. Takeshi manages to tangle the helicopter rotors using a long wire, causing the helicopter to engulf in flames. Unfortunately, Karl set a mechanism to activate the bomb which will detonate within ten minutes after he dies. After the White Knight's spear permanently maims Gryphon's hands, Gryphon emits a supersonic wave, which causes Al, Juzo and Carol to endure severe headaches. When Takeshi struggles to disarm the bomb, he decides to carry the bomb away while remembering that his will to live was renewed because of his friends. The White Rabbit fully awakens and flies at the speed of light towards the sea. With all his might, Hayato severs Red in half with the White Knight's spear. The White Rabbit drops the bomb at the bottom of the sea in order to buffer the impending explosion, allowing Takeshi to survive. The bust of Red crumbles until his core chip begins to wither, revealing that the ARMS technology dies when the core chip is destroyed. Ryo, Kei and Yugo locate the command center at the baseball stadium, and they wait for the others to regroup. At the baseball stadium, Gauss prepares to use a weapon more powerful than a nuclear missile.
24	24	"Venom" "Mōdoku (vu~enomu)" (猛毒（ヴェノム）)	September 15, 2001
Ryo, Kei and Yugo enter the baseball stadium, where Ryo is then attacked by four masked men armed with blades. However, this was just a distraction for Gauss to snipe Ryo with a prototype silver bullet. When Koichi is suddenly attacked by the Red Caps, he is saved by the timely appearance of Li. Gauss explains that the prototype silver bullet was laced with venomous nanomachines capable of destroying ARMS technology from the inside out. After Kei is momentarily attacked by the four masked men, Yugo uses her telepathic powers to control them, only to face repercussions when they get hit by Gauss's troops. Within the subconscious of the Jabberwock, Ryo searches for a way to neutralize the computer virus. Ryo is shocked to find Katsumi playing the organ in the church. As Yugo nearly risked her life, Kei tries to fight back against the Red Caps until the members of the Blue Men arrive to lend a hand. Since he is still inside the Jabberwock's mind, Ryo realizes that Katsumi was just a hallucination, causing the Jabberwock to go berserk.
25	25	"Judgment" "Shinban (jajjimento)" (審判（ジャッジメント）)	September 22, 2001
Hayato, Al, Juzo and Carol head towards the baseball stadium. As the venomous nanomachines begin to attack the Jabberwock, Ryo repels them and encourages the Jabberwock to fight back. Ryo is invited to look inside the depths of Jabberwock's soul, where he finds a crying girl. As they touch hands, this eradicates the venomous nanomachines, and the girl is revealed to be Alice, the progenitor of the ARMS technology, before she suddenly vanishes. After finally swearing his loyalty to Ryo, the Jabberwock regains consciousness, cloaked with a fiery armor. The Jabberwock easily annihilates Gauss's troops in and around the baseball stadium, while Kei, Yugo and the Blue Men take cover and evacuate from the baseball stadium. The White Knight warns Hayato that Ryo will need to be destroyed when the Jabberwock will become a potential enemy. Ryo uses the Jabberwock to confront Gauss, who tries to escape in a trailer. As Gauss's troops fend off the Jabberwock with heavy artillery, Gauss gets away in a helicopter. Aya reunites with her mother and father, while Gauss and the Red Caps simultaneously die by midnight when their artificially engineered bodies begin to degrade and age at an exponential rate.
26	26	"Fly" "Kaikō (furai)" (邂逅（フライ）)	September 29, 2001
With Gauss and the Red Caps now dead, Ryo, Hayato, Takeshi, Kei, Al, Misa, Juzo, Yugo and Carol meet at the baseball stadium. Keith Black, Keith Green, Keith Silver and Keith Violet briefly appear in a helicopter, showing that they have Katsumi in their custody. After arriving with Koichi at the baseball stadium, Li takes Ryo, Hayato, Takeshi and Kei to the church in order to meet the founder of the Blue Men, who is none other than Keith Blue. Explaining that he and his siblings are called the "Keith Series", Blue reveals how the four ARMS teens were created from the data stolen from the Egrigori that Blue obtained. In fact, the Egrigori plans to develop a race of superhumans for world domination. Based on recent footage, it is shown that Katsumi was taken by the other four Keiths to Arizona as part of a plot to lure Ryo, Hayato, Takeshi and Kei into rescuing Katsumi. The four ARMS teens prepare to set off on a dangerous mission, each of them saying goodbye to their loved ones.

===== Season 2 =====
No. overall	No. in season	Title	Original release date
27	1	"Alive" "Enrai (araivu)" (遠来（アライヴ）)	October 6, 2001
Keith Black, Keith Green, Keith Silver and Keith Violet have a discussion about what Ryo Takatsuki, Hayato Shingu, Takeshi Tomoe and Kei Kuruma have been through so far. This includes the appearance and recurrence of Keith Red up until his death, as well as the first times that the Jabberwock, the White Knight and the White Rabbit each fully awakened. Ryo, Hayato, Takeshi, Kei, Al Bowen, Koichi Kabuto and Yugo Gilbert arrive in Arizona and drive a recreational vehicle to a town called Gallows Bell. Although advised by a man named Richard Brenton to leave town, the seven of them decide to stay overnight at a hotel. At nine o'clock in the evening, Al follows Koichi outside, as to which Koichi is led into a trap seemingly set up by the Egrigori. Ryo, Hayato, Takeshi, Kei and Yugo are approached by Stinger, the leader of a group of non-cyborg combat soldiers called the Hounds.
28	2	"Hound" "Ryōken (haundo)" (猟犬（ハウンド）)	October 13, 2001
After Stinger proves to be unstoppable, Yugo ends up getting kidnapped by Stinger's partner. Ryo, Hayato, Takeshi and Kei fight off the Hounds, who are just stalling for time. Meanwhile, Al is approached by Oscar Brenton, the leader of young geniuses called the Chapel Children, who are in charge of the Hounds. As Takeshi is captured by the Hounds, Al surprisingly learns that Oscar plans to capture the ARMS teens and turn them into soldiers. Ryo recalls that killing the alpha would throw the rest of the pack into chaos and confusion. Kei is almost captured by the Hounds when a missile triggers an unsettling memory. Stinger ends up retreating when Ryo attempts to attack him. Held captive at a research facility, Takeshi, Koichi and Yugo find out that Al has been in cahoots with Oscar the entire time. After telling Ryo and Hayato to get some rest at the hotel, Kei leaves without them the next morning. While eating breakfast, Ryo and Hayato soon encounter Violet.
29	3	"Hunted" "Tōshi (hantā)" (闘士（ハンター）)	October 20, 2001
A flashback reveals that Kei survived being trapped inside a burning building, while three other children died. Meanwhile, Violet reveals that the Keith Series were clones surgically implanted with the ARMS technology in early testing, believed to have changed their personalities. When Kei passes out in the desert, she meets a wandering businessman named Iwao Takatsuki, who rehydrates her. After Iwao singlehandedly defeat some Egrigori soldiers, he offers to tell her the history of Gallows Bell. Before leaving, Violet mentions that the Egrigori had nothing to do with the Hounds capturing the others. Iwao shows Kei that Gallows Bell was built inside a hidden crater, seemingly the birthplace of the Egrigori. Oscar shows Al a secret weapon for beating the Egrigori. Takeshi tells Koichi and Yugo that Al would never betray them. As Ryo and Hayato discuss that the ARMS technology might change their personalities, Kei finally finds them in the streets. However, as a man named Robert Roswell tries to chase the three of them away for being ARMS teens, a young girl named Shirley Roswell comes to the rescue.
30	4	"Link" "Shinrai (rinku)" (信頼（リンク）)	October 27, 2001
Before leaving, Shirley reveals that she is a member of the Chapel Children. Iwao previously told Kei about a strange meteorite buried at the site of Gallows Bell long ago. Oscar shows Al the strange meteorite codenamed Azazel, the material used to create ARMS technology. In an abandoned warehouse, Kei briefs Ryo and Hayato about her plan to outsmart the Hounds. At nine o'clock in the evening, Ryo, Hayato and Kei attack the Hounds. When the hotel is destroyed, Ryo, Hayato and Kei rush to the abandoned warehouse, where the Hounds fall victim to several booby traps. As they escape, Ryo, Hayato and Kei figure out that the Hounds are genetically altered. Meanwhile, Al secretly frees Takeshi, Koichi and Yugo without blowing his cover. An outraged Stinger confronts Ryo, Hayato and Kei at the church, prompting a duel between Ryo and Stinger on the rooftop. After heeding Al's words, Oscar urges Stinger to stop fighting before he might die. Stinger accidentally dismantles the church bell, though Takeshi saves Oscar from being crushed. Al tells Shirley that the Egrigori troops are heading towards Gallows Bell in order to prevent the rebellion of the Chapel Children.
31	5	"Hercules" "Raishū (hākyurī)" (来襲（ハーキュリー）)	November 3, 2001
Violet tells Iwao that the Keith Series do not always share the same opinions. Ryo, Hayato, Takeshi, Kei, Al, Koichi and Yugo view Azazel in the research laboratory. Azazel is actually a microscopic colonial lifeform capable of consolidation and reformation. Hayato is impressed when he witnesses Al talking some sense into the Chapel Children. Silver leads Epsilon, the Egrigori secret military force, to surround the perimeter of Gallows Bell. After suggesting to Al an escape plan towards a river, Ryo urges Stinger to order the Hounds to evacuate the Chapel Children, recalling the incident involving Katsumi Akagi at Abumisawa. As Epsilon begins infiltrating the research laboratory, Al tries to find the underground waterway. Stinger takes out some Epsilon soldiers, while Koichi rallies the townspeople, including Richard and Robert, to protect the Chapel Children. When Koichi gets separated from the townspeople, some other Epsilon soldiers spray the townspeople with deadly nanomachine weaponry called the Locusts. With the Chapel Children left in tears, Ryo goes on a full rampage until he succumbs to being paralyzed by the Locusts. However, Yugo wears a hazmat suit and staggers to bring another one for Ryo.
32	6	"Incubation" "Fuka (inkyubēshon)" (孵化（インキュベーション）)	November 10, 2001
Yugo recovers Ryo in the hallway, while Al reveals that he closed the shutters so that the Locusts can be sealed off into one chamber. Epsilon has gained access to Azazel, planning an escort route. Since the Jabberwock is temporarily out of commission, Yugo vows to protect Ryo in the meantime. Azazel is surprisingly brought out of suspended animation and assumes the form of the Jabberwock, easily killing some Epsilon soldiers. Unfortunately, one Epsilon soldier manages to shoot Yugo in the head before dying, causing Ryo to be gradually absorbed by the Jabberwock. Elsewhere, Hayato and Takeshi choose to ignore the White Knight and the White Rabbit when they warn that Ryo must be slain. Inside the subconsciousness of the Jabberwock, Ryo is told by an illusion of Katsumi that he must fight for the sake of his friends. Yugo makes peace with herself and passes away, knowing how much Ryo cares about Katsumi. As a bright light briefly shines, Yugo is revived when Azazel devours the Locusts. Ryo embraces Azazel upon assuming the form of Katsumi, causing the four ARMS teens to simultaneously shed tears before Azazel dissolves into thin air.
33	7	"Mars" "Taiga (māzu)" (火神（マーズ）)	November 17, 2001
Koichi finds the underground waterway that was sealed off for decades. Stinger orders the Hounds to safely escort the surviving kids and civilians to the underground waterway. As Ryo realizes that Yugo projected herself as an illusion of Katsumi, Yugo thanks Ryo for saving her life. Disregarding Violet's pleas, Silver orders Epsilon to exterminate everyone and everything in Gallows Bell since Azazel is no longer a factor. Hayato and Takeshi prepare for battle, but Kei is unable to detect the first wave of Epsilon soldiers since they are enhanced to move at supersonic speed. Ryo is confronted by Silver, who transforms his ARMS named the Mad Hatter. Koichi and Al explore the bone-dry underground waterway, hoping to find an exit. Takeshi protects Hayato from the Epsilon soldiers, while Ryo struggles in his fight against Silver. Recalling that Juzo once told him that silence is the key to winning any battle, Hayato finally proves to be useful in sensing supersonic speed. However, Kei warns Hayato that a second wave of Epsilon soldiers is soon approaching. When Silver causes mass destruction, Ryo shoots down a water tower, causing the area to steam around them and giving Ryo the upper hand.
34	8	"Canary" "Torikago (kanaria)" (鳥篭（カナリア）)	November 24, 2001
Silver is caught off guard when he is unable to heal from a scratch on his chest made by Ryo. The Mad Hatter fully awakens, seeking to kill Ryo once and for all. In the past, Silver was told by Black that the Keith Series do not have free will, in which Silver was shocked to find out that his pet canary did not survive after it was implanted with ARMS technology. Back in the present, Takeshi tries to rescue Ryo from the Mad Hatter, but Takeshi ends up blasted in the left leg by the Mad Hatter's fireball. Before the Mad Hatter attempts to kill Takeshi, the Jabberwock fully awakens and evolves. The Jabberwock easily kills the Mad Hatter in one shot, creating a nuclear explosion in Gallows Bell. As Kei and Yugo eagerly wait, Stinger advises Hayato to go on ahead in the underground waterway, but Hayato refuses to go anywhere without Ryo and Takeshi. Moments later, Takeshi arrives at the entrance of the underground waterway with Ryo in tow.
35	9	"Silent" "Shijima (sairento)" (静寂（サイレント）)	December 1, 2001
With everyone hiding in the underground waterway, Oscar seals off the entrance using explosive charges. Violet takes over command of Epsilon after the death of Silver. Al is confident that there is an exit due to the formation of stalagmites and stalactites. While setting up camp, Hayato has a brief heartfelt moment with Kei, who says that a leader sees the strengths and assets of her teammates. Al mocks Oscar for being at fault with the innocent people who lost their lives. Yugo believes that Al has a good-natured heart, while Stinger encourages Ryo to focus on the reason for fighting the battle ahead. Meanwhile, Katsumi waits in a mansion as she trusts that Green will bring the ARMS teens to her. Deeper inside the underground waterway, the group comes across a boulder, where a hologram of Katsumi is temporarily projected. After the ARMS teens push aside the boulder, the group makes it to the Colorado River in the Grand Canyon. Suddenly, Green appears and summons the Egrigori troops to shoot at the civilians, causing the Jabberwock to fully awaken and destroy the helicopters out of rage.
36	10	"Stream" "Honryū (sutorīmu)" (奔流（ストリーム）)	December 8, 2001
Hayato, Takeshi, Kei, Al, Koichi and Yugo deal with carrying the wounded and burying the deceased. Green demonstrates his ability to control space and time, being able to disappear and reappear anywhere. After mutilating the limbs of the Jabberwock, Green prepares to take out Ryo's core chip. However, the voice of Alice causes a massive earthquake as she proclaims that she hates everyone. After the limbs of the Jabberwock regenerate, the Jabberwock momentarily strikes Green before the latter evades and vanishes. Bent on trying to kill Ryo, both the White Knight and the White Rabbit fully awaken. Hayato and Takeshi try to reason with the White Knight and the White Rabbit, but to no avail. Ryo calls out to Alice, hoping to know why she hates everyone. Overwhelmed with feeling useless in this situation, Kei tries to stop the fight by putting herself in harm's way, allowing the Queen of Hearts to fully awaken. The Queen of Hearts reverts Ryo, Hayato and Takeshi to normal, while Kei has yet to learn from the Queen of Hearts that her mission is to restore emotional balance between Ryo, Hayato and Takeshi.
37	11	"Forward" "Zenshin (fowādo)" (前進（フォワード）)	December 15, 2001
Violet arrives at the Grand Canyon with medical assistance for the wounded civilians, though Kei personally threatens Violet if any of the wounded civilians are killed under her care. Ryo, Hayato, Takeshi, Kei, Al, Koichi and Yugo are taken to a conference room. They all meet Katsumi's mother, who explains that Ryo and Katsumi's first encounter during childhood was predetermined and not coincidental. Katsumi's mother brings them to a research laboratory, revealed to be Katsumi's birthplace. Katsumi was not implanted with ARMS technology because the Blue Men stole the four core chips that would go to Ryo, Hayato, Takeshi and Kei. At dawn, Ryo, Hayato, Takeshi, Kei, Al, Koichi and Yugo set out to find Samuel Tillinghast, a scientist who may know everything about ARMS technology. At the mansion, Green is shocked when Katsumi trims her hair. Meanwhile, Samuel informs Black that the Jabberwock has a cannon that contains antimatter, which is powerful enough to wipe out humanity. Ryo, Hayato, Takeshi, Kei, Koichi and Yugo set their plan in motion to ambush Samuel in the streets from an apartment owned by Li Chunyan.
38	12	"Coma" "Konsui (kōma)" (昏睡（コーマ）)	December 22, 2001
After Samuel is taken hostage, the group witnesses Samuel's snobbish behavior and he demands for a cup of Earl Grey tea and a so-called blue rosebush from his apartment. At the Egrigori special experiment facility, Green requests the release of the bloodthirsty mutant Karunagi Kou. Green orders Karunagi to target Hayato, Takeshi and Kei while leaving Ryo unharmed. Al challenges Samuel to a game of chess, in which the loser must tell the winner everything. Karunagi easily defeats Hayato and Takeshi on the apartment complex rooftop. When Ryo and Kei arrive on the apartment complex rooftop, Ryo protects Kei from getting hurt by Karunagi. Koichi prepares to get the car ready, while Li prepares to escort Samuel to a safer location. Ryo and Karunagi engage in a fierce battle, but Karunagi leaves when Ryo is internally informed by Yugo that Takeshi is dead. Thanks to the tears of Ryo, Hayato, Kei and Yugo, Takeshi regains a pulse and is taken to the hospital. However, they learn that Takeshi has fallen into a coma, which leaves Hayato feeling helpless and Kei feeling responsible.
39	13	"Element" "Himizu (eremento)" (火水（エレメント）)	December 29, 2001
In order to clear his mind, Hayato leaves the others behind at the hospital, while the others have faith that Hayato will return. At night, Iwao saves Hayato from being mugged by a group of thugs before Hayato passes out. Hayato regains consciousness at a dojo, where Iwao eats his breakfast. Iwao brings Hayato to meet a blind elderly woman named Mama Maria, who tells Hayato to dig deeper into his power. Afterwards, Iwao takes Hayato on a mission to shut down the crime operations of a gang leader named Pazorini at his large estate. After taking down the Dobermanns surrounding the estate, Iwao defeats the guards on the inside in the dark while telling Hayato to turn his fiery heart into water. While Kei is shown to be worried about Hayato, Li interrogates Samuel about Karunagi. Hayato finally digs deeper into his power and defeats more guards on his own. Iwao plants a bomb in the estate, forcing Pazorini to evacuate. Hayato learns from Iwao that Mama Maria has passed away, and a funeral is held in her honor in the streets. Iwao disappears after giving a note to Hayato, who then catches a glimpse of Violet.
40	14	"Rebirth" "Fukkatsu (ribāsu)" (復活（リバース）)	January 5, 2002
Since Takeshi's coma and Hayato's sudden departure, Ryo recounts the times that he had to fight and rely on his friends. Things really changed when the Queen of Hearts finally fully awakened at the Grand Canyon. Samuel wins against Al eight consecutive times in their game of chess. As a consolation prize, Samuel refers Al to an online chatroom, where Alice is the avatar programmed with artificial intelligence. Preparing to fight Karunagi outside, Ryo is reminded by Yugo about Azazel. However, Karunagi easily subdues Ryo and Yugo before heading inside to handle Koichi and Li. Koichi ends up critically injured, while Li gets a few bruises. When Karunagi nearly kills Kei, Hayato timely arrives and faces off against Karunagi. Even with his sharpened reflexes, Hayato is still unable to lay a hand on Karunagi. Fortunately, the White Knight finally comes back, allowing Hayato to finally defeat Karunagi. Hayato promises that he will never leave Kei ever again.
41	15	"Drakken" "Rihan (dorakken)" (離反（ドラッケン）)	January 12, 2002
Koichi is admitted to the hospital. Takeshi is engulfed by his ARMS technology, in which Takeshi is being dismantled and reconstructed, but not even Samuel knows what will happen to Takeshi. Yugo does not need to use telepathy to read people anymore, while Ryo worries that he might slaughter humanity if the Jabberwock fully awakens again. The Blue Men are attacked by cyborg Johan Horst, the leader of the Drakken Corps, which is affiliated with the Blue Men. Johan wants to destroy the ARMS teens, but Ryo tries to reason with Johan. It is revealed that the Drakken Corps were originally turncoats for the Egrigori, while Gashure was a comrade of Johan. After Ryo resists in letting loose the Jabberwock, Hayato causes Johan to withdraw. At a basketball court, Hayato urges Ryo to fight, but Ryo is afraid of the Jabberwock consuming his anger. Hayato affirms to Ryo that they control their ARMS technology and not the other way around. Ryo later confronts Johan in a warehouse, trying not to release the Jabberwock in the process. After a good talk, Johan finally agrees to work with the Blue Men and the ARMS teens.
42	16	"Alice" "Tanjō (Arisu)" (誕生（アリス）)	January 19, 2002
Alice was the creator of the first successful blue rosebushes. Al informs Hayato that the online chatroom is notifying that the White Rabbit is here. Samuel reveals to the others that Alice was his daughter, while Keith White was the progenitor of the Keith Series. In the past, Alice was a child prodigy who oversaw the experimental children, and she created an artificial intelligence program to communicate with Azazel. Alice learned that Azazel wished for a heart, so Alice taught Azazel about emotions. After Alice wished to free the experimental children so they could see the blue sea and sky, White denied this request and slapped her in the face. Alice said her final goodbye to Azazel and tried to free the experimental children. However, Alice was caught by White, who then ordered the experimental children to be slaughtered. Alice ran into the gunfire and was left unconscious, then Azazel angrily broke out of the chamber and wreaked havoc. Azazel fused with Alice, becoming the four parts of the original ARMS technology that were later implanted in the ARMS teens. In the present, Takeshi is still in a coma as he meets Alice for the first time.
43	17	"Turn" "Tenkai (tān)" (転回（ターン）)	January 26, 2002
When Black became the first successful clone to be implanted with ARMS technology, he set out to destroy the research laboratory and carry out Alice's will, much to Samuel's shock. In the present, Samuel urges Ryo to kill what is left of Alice, but Ryo believes that he can save Alice and bring back Takeshi. Samuel says that Katsumi is being kept at the Karion Fortress, a secret island home to the Egrigori headquarters. Meanwhile, Black shows Green to a chamber where Azazel is being kept. During a downpour, Green returns to the mansion, where he begs Katsumi to run away with him, but Black soon stands in their way. While Katsumi runs away, a battle ensues as Green transforms his ARMS named the Cheshire Cat. However, Black evades the attacks and proceeds to capture Katsumi. After critically injuring Green, Black reveals that Katsumi is a clone. Violet later finds Green, wondering if Black is really carrying out Alice's will. Traveling on a bridge that leads to the Karion Fortress, Al informs Ryo, Hayato, Kei, Yugo and Samuel that the online chatroom is a direct way to communicate with Alice. Suddenly, Violet arrives to prevent Katsumi from being saved and Alice from being destroyed.
44	18	"Arcadia" "Genkyō (arukadia)" (幻境（アルカディア）)	February 2, 2002
On the bridge, Violet transforms her ARMS named the March Hare and alters the perception of reality. Al figures out that Violet harnesses the energy of nanomachine light particles. Violet changes the scenery to a meadow full of blue rosebushes, revealing that this was Alice's vision of the outside world. As Violet then changes the scenery to a town in ruins, she knocks out Kei, who briefly saw the bridge. When Violet proceeds to attack Ryo, Hayato jumps in the way before fully awakening the White Knight. Gaining the senses of the White Knight despite enduring massive pain, Hayato manages to detect Violet's movements when the White Knight soon evolves. Inside a church, Alice tells Takeshi that her will was separated into the good White Alice and the evil Black Alice, whereas the Jabberwock was born from the latter. As Hayato gains the upper hand and eventually defeats Violet, who once questioned her humanity to Mama Maria long ago. Takeshi offers White Alice to fly with him and meet his friends on the bridge. However, Black Alice summons high winds which cause White Alice to let go of Takeshi.
45	19	"Killing Field" "Senjō (kiringufīrudo)" (戦場（キリングフィールド）)	February 9, 2002
Al and Samuel talk about the Schumann resonances and the Gaia hypothesis, discussing how the ARMS technology and the Earth itself can communicate with each other. Ryo believes that there is still hope after realizing that the four parts of the ARMS technology are fragments of Alice's psyche. Meanwhile, Iwao is approached by the U.S. President, who requests help in taking down the Egrigori. Grateful that Koichi saved her faith in justice, Li rallies the Blue Men, including Ralph Coleman, for an impending war against the Egrigori. Upon arriving at the island, Ryo, Hayato, Kei, Al, Yugo and Samuel are relieved that Takeshi is alive and well when he catches up to them. Takeshi handles a wave of Egrigori guards on his own, while the others enter the Karion Fortress, where they are met by Black in a dining room. After briefly projecting a hologram of Katsumi to prove that she is still alive, Black reveals that he was the one who murdered Hayato's late father Shuichiro. Before vanishing into thin air, Black puts up a wall that separates Ryo and Hayato from Kei, Al, Yugo and Samuel. Iwao hitches a ride in a submarine headed towards the Karion Fortress.
46	20	"Fortress" "Yōsai (fōtoresu)" (要塞（フォートレス）)	February 16, 2002
Iwao arrives on the island, where Violet is there waiting for him. Li and Ralph attack the Egrigori troops in helicopters at the Karion Fortress. However, when Takeshi arrives to assist, Li and Ralph are momentarily shot down into the forest. Ryo and Hayato break through the wall, only to be surrounded by more walls. Kei, Al, Yugo and Samuel take an elevator to the ground floor. Ryo and Hayato encounter Huey Graham, the leader of the Next, bald cyborg clones whose brains are uploaded with preexisting memories. However, Ryo and Hayato are no match against the Next. Takeshi finds Li and Ralph in the crashed helicopter. Kei, Al, Yugo and Samuel are sent deeper inside the ground floor, where they meet the hologram of Dewey Graham, Huey's father and the director of the Egrigori cyborg development group. Before trapping them in an enclosed area, Dewey reveals that the Karion Fortress serves as his cyborg body and that his functions will cease if the central processing unit is destroyed. Takeshi nearly risks his life when he redirects a missile launched at Li and Ralph.
47	21	"Junction" "Kōsaku (jankushon)" (交錯（ジャンクション）)	February 23, 2002
The Jabberwock fully awakens, proving to be stronger than the Next by conducting super oscillation. Hayato is at a crossroads when the White Knight questions if Ryo is truly free from the control of the Jabberwock. With Li left wounded, Ralph opts to stay by her side on the battlefield. Koichi arrives armed with a bazooka and offers to carry Li, while Johan and the Drakken Corps lend their support to the Blue Men. Kei, Al, Yugo and Samuel see a hologram of Black Alice, who is the Jabberwock incarnate. Hayato witnesses as the Jabberwock continues to eradicate the Next until White Alice appears, reverting Ryo to normal and purging him from anger. After Ryo proclaims to Huey that he is driven by his heart, Johan and the Drakken Corps arrive to handle Huey and the Next while Ryo and Hayato move forward and follow White Alice. Kei, Al, Yugo and Samuel find the central processing unit, where Samuel personally destroys it after seeing a hologram of Dewey one last time. The Karion Fortress will self-destruct in ten minutes, so Kei, Al, Yugo and Samuel enter an underground tunnel that will lead them to White Alice.
48	22	"Human" "Ningen (hyūman)" (人間（ヒューマン）)	March 2, 2002
Kei, Al, Yugo and Samuel cross paths with Huey, in which Al berates for not understanding what it means to be human. After rescuing Green from containment and declaring that their fates are not sealed, Violet orders all surviving Egrigori troops to evacuate from the Karion Fortress. Huey is crushed under the rubble after hearing Dewey's last words of apology for trying to create the perfect emotionless cyborg. A hologram of Black briefly tells Samuel that hope is the cruelest misfortune according to the legend of Pandora's box. Upon reaching the final barrier of the underground tunnel, Samuel shields Al from an incoming explosion. Ryo and Hayato reunite with Kei, Al, Yugo and Samuel, but Samuel is critically wounded and left behind. When Iwao passes by, Samuel recalls when he first entrusted the four parts of the ARMS technology to Blue long ago. After confessing his feelings for Katsumi, Green is stabbed by Black right in front of Katsumi. Green uses the last ounce of his strength and teleports to the underground tunnel, offering to take Ryo directly where Black is holding Katsumi, who then embraces Ryo in tears.
49	23	"Revelation" "Mokushi (ribereishon)" (黙示（リベレイション）)	March 9, 2002
Green passes away peacefully after gaining closure. In the chamber, Ryo gains full control of the Jabberwock as he faces off against Black, who reveals that he can mimic the attacks of others, including Silver and Violet. As Ryo pierces Black in the chest, Black absorbs this power, recalling that he used this dormant power to kill White. However, White is resurrected and takes control of Black's body, mimicking Green's attacks to make Ryo accidentally kill Katsumi, who is then engulfed by Azazel. Ryo's agony causes Black Alice to awaken from Azazel. The Jabberwock merges with Black Alice as a giant towering over the island. Hayato and Takeshi each gain full control of the White Knight and White Rabbit, hoping to find a way to save Ryo instead of destroying him. Kei piggybacks on Hayato, knowing that they will fight using their own free will.
50	24	"Animus" "Sekai (animusu)" (世界（アニムス）)	March 16, 2002
The Egrigori launches a nuclear missile headed towards the Jabberwock. Hayato recalls that he owes his change of heart to Ryo. With Kei unable to land a hit on the Jabberwock, the Queen of Hearts tells Kei that there is a way to destroy the ARMS technology, though all four ARMS teens and the remaining members of the Keith Series will perish. When Kei feels Hayato's agony from attacking Ryo, she tells the Queen of Hearts not to destroy the ARMS technology. Black Alice absorbs Hayato and Kei inside the Jabberwock, urging Yugo to do something and ignoring Al's pleas of despair. Takeshi goes after the nuclear missile, but Black interferes. The Jabberwock engulfs the nuclear missile, while White Alice tells Takeshi not to give up. Blue finally arrives on the island and finds Violet. Hayato and Kei are attacked by an illusion of Ryo inside the Jabberwock until Takeshi goes inside the Jabberwock and wipes out the illusion of Ryo. The real Ryo is held captive by Black Alice. As Ryo confronts his evil inner self, Yugo projects herself inside the Jabberwock and risks her life for Ryo, leaving Al in tears.
51	25	"Blue Wish" "Aozora (burūu~isshu)" (青空（ブルーウィッシュ）)	March 23, 2002
Ryo manage to overcome his evil inner self, while Yugo is too weak to move. Black Alice runs off after blaming Ryo for Katsumi's death. Promising to hang out with Yugo when the battle is over, Ryo chases after Black Alice and leaves Yugo behind as she passes away. Violet and Blue confront White for using Black, Silver and Green as pawns. Ryo finds himself cornered by Gryphon and the Mad Hatter until Hayato and Takeshi arrives to help him. When White strikes Violet, Iwao arrives to save Violet and takes her to Koichi, Li and Ralph. Ryo realizes that the Jabberwock still swears loyalty to him, in which the Jabberwock now has free will. Ryo tears through the fabric of reality inside the Jabberwock, revealing that Katsumi is still alive. White Alice embraces Black Alice, which consumes both of them in flames. Meanwhile, Blue transforms his ARMS named the Dormouse, and White transforms his ARMS named Humpty Dumpty. When Humpty Dumpty stabs the Dormouse, they both fall into a chasm. The explosion then eradicates the Jabberwock.
52	26	"Life" "Kikan (raifu)" (帰還（ライフ）)	March 30, 2002
Before disappearing, Alice says that her functions will cease to exist but the world will remain intact. She urges the ARMS teens to live life to the fullest and never abandon the power of hope. In the aftermath, Ryo, Hayato, Takeshi, Kei, Katsumi, Al and Carol visit the grave of Yugo. Ryo vows to never forget about Yugo, recalling that she always protected him. Other flashback scenes occur, starting with Green being unable to save Katsumi from Black at the mansion and ending with the final battle between Blue and White on the island. The final scene shows Blue and Black as kids hiding in the destroyed research laboratory. Holding an hourglass with blue sand, Blue says that they represent the blue sand, but they should figurative break the hourglass and be free to live their own lives.

== Reception ==
The manga has had over 15 million copies in circulation. Project ARMS won the 44th Shogakukan Manga Award for the shōnen category in 1999.

== See also ==
- Area D, another manga series written by Nanatsuki
- Tantei Xeno to Nanatsu no Satsujin Misshitsu, another manga series written by Nanatsuki
- Sunday vs Magazine: Shūketsu! Chōjō Daikessen, a video game including characters from the series
