= Issak =

Japanese manga series

- First tankōbon volume cover, featuring Issak

イサック (Isakku)
- Genre: Action; Drama; Historical
- Manga
- Written by: Shinji Makari
- Illustrated by: Double-S
- Published by: Kodansha
- English publisher: NA: Kodansha USA
- Imprint: Afternoon KC
- Magazine: Monthly Afternoon
- Original run: January 25, 2017 – April 24, 2025
- Volumes: 19
- icon

Issak (Japanese: イサック, Hepburn: Isakku) is a Japanese manga series written by Shinji Makari and illustrated by Double-S. It was serialized in Kodansha's seinen manga magazine Monthly Afternoon from January 2017 to April 2025, with its chapters collected in 19 tankōbon volumes.

== Publication ==
Written by Shinji Makari and illustrated by Double-S, Issak was serialized in Kodansha's seinen manga magazine Monthly Afternoon from January 25, 2017, to April 24, 2025. Kodansha collected its chapters in nineteen tankōbon volumes, released from July 21, 2017, to June 23, 2025.

At San Diego Comic-Con 2023, Kodansha USA announced that they licensed the series for English digital publication. As of November 10, 2026, sixteen volumes have been released digitally. At San Diego Comic-Con 2024, Kodansha USA announced that they would begin releasing 2-in-1 print omnibus versions in Q2 2025. As of November 10, 2026, eight omnibus volumes have been released.

=== Volumes ===
No.	Original release date	Original ISBN	English release date	English ISBN
1	July 21, 2017	978-4-06-388281-0	August 15, 2023 (digital); June 10, 2025 (omnibus)	978-1-68-491753-2 (digital); 979-8-88877-495-3 (omnibus)
1. "Meager Reinforcements" (たった一人の援軍, Tatta Hitori no Engun); 2. "Mercenary Contracts" (傭兵契約, Yōhei Keiyaku); 3. "Crown Prince Alfonso" (王太子アルフォンソ, Ō Taishi Arufonso)
2	November 22, 2017	978-4-06-510346-3	September 19, 2023 (digital); June 10, 2025 (omnibus)	978-1-68-491754-9 (digital); 979-8-88877-495-3 (omnibus)
4. "Zetta's Choice" (ゼッタの決意, Zetta no Ketsui); 5. "Struggle in the Valley" (渓谷の攻防, Keikoku no Kōbō); 6. "The Two Guns" (二つの銃, Futatsu no Jū); 7. "Issak and Lorenzo" (イサックとロレンツォ, Isakku to Rorentso)
3	March 23, 2018	978-4-06-511054-6	October 17, 2023 (digital); August 19, 2025 (omnibus)	978-1-68-491755-6 (digital); 979-8-88877-496-0 (omnibus)
8. "Isaku and Renzo" (猪左久(いさく)と錬蔵(れんぞう), Isaku to Renzō); 9. "Lid" (蓋, Futa); 10. "Barrel" (樽, Taru); 11. "The Crown Prince Revisited" (王太子、ふたたび, Ō Taishi, Futatabi)
4	July 23, 2018	978-4-06-511980-8	November 21, 2023 (digital); August 19, 2025 (omnibus)	978-1-68-491756-3 (digital); 979-8-88877-496-0 (omnibus)
12. "The Bullet's Path" (銃弾のゆくえ, Jūdan no Yukue); 13. "Unexpected News" (思わぬ知らせ, Omowanu Shirase); 14. "Breakthrough" (突入, Totsunyū); 15. "The Wall" (壁, Kabe); 16. "Do or Die" (決死, Kesshi)
5	November 22, 2018	978-4-06-513448-1	December 26, 2023 (digital); October 7, 2025 (omnibus)	978-1-68-491757-0 (digital); 979-8-88877-497-7 (omnibus)
17. "A Girl's Prayer" (少女の祈り, Shōjo no Inori); 18. "Determination" (決断, Ketsudan); 19. "Behind Enemy Lines" (敵地深くへ, Tekichi Fukaku e); 20. "The Imperial Baron" (帝国男爵, Teikoku Danshaku); 21. "von Harrach" (フォン・ハラハ, Fon Haraha)
6	April 23, 2019	978-4-06-515192-1	February 20, 2024 (digital); October 7, 2025 (omnibus)	978-1-68-491758-7 (digital); 979-8-88877-497-7 (omnibus)
22. "Fight on the Rapids" (激流の戦い, Gekiryū no Tatakai); 23. "At the Sign of the Wildcat" (山猫亭にて, Yamaneko-tei nite); 24. "The Trial" (裁判, Saiban); 25. "The Burning" (火刑, Kakei); 26. "Dream" (夢, Yume)
7	September 20, 2019	978-4-06-516942-1	April 30, 2024 (digital); December 9, 2025 (omnibus)	978-1-68-491759-4 (digital); 979-8-88877-498-4 (omnibus)
27. "Two Mounted Units" (二つの騎兵部隊, Futatsu no Kihei Butai); 28. "The General's Ambition" (将軍の野望, Shōgun no Yabō); 29. "Red Beard" (赤髭(あかひげ), Aka Hige); 30. "Bait" (囮(おとり), Otori); 31. "A Gunshot Most Terrible Echoes Across the Battlefield" (響く銃声, Hibiku Jūsei)
8	February 21, 2020	978-4-06-518449-3	June 18, 2024 (digital); December 9, 2025 (omnibus)	978-1-68-491760-0 (digital); 979-8-88877-498-4 (omnibus)
32. "Zetta and the Prince-Elector" (選帝侯とゼッタ, Sen Tei-kō to Zetta); 33. "To the Death" (死闘, Shitō); 34. "Resolve" (執念, Shūnen); 35. "Destiny" (使命, Shimei); 36. "The Plan" (作戦, Sakusen)
9	July 20, 2020	978-4-06-520129-9	August 20, 2024 (digital); February 10, 2026 (omnibus)	978-1-68-491761-7 (digital); 979-8-88877-499-1 (omnibus)
37. "Time to Act" (決行, Kekkō); 38. "Alight" (着火, Chakka); 39. "The Missing Gun" (不在の銃, Fuzai no Jū); 40. "The Fight of the Destitute" (貧者の戦い, Hinja no Tatakai); 41. "Battle for the Rhine" (ライン川の攻防, Rain Kawa no kōbō)
10	January 21, 2021	978-4-06-521987-4	October 22, 2024 (digital); February 10, 2026 (omnibus)	978-1-68-491762-4 (digital); 979-8-88877-499-1 (omnibus)
42. "An Implacable Blow" (執念の一撃, Shūnen no Ichigeki); 43. "Ghosts of Leiden" (ライデンの亡霊, Raiden no Bōrei); 44. "Inflitrating Leiden" (潜入! ライデン市, Sennyū! Raiden-shi); 45. "How the Dutch Shoot" (オランダ式射撃術, Oranda-shiki Shageki-jutsu); 46. "Japan" (ヤーパン, Yāpan); 47. "Gunners vs. Horsemen" (銃士vs.騎兵!, Jūshi vs. Kihei!)
11	July 21, 2021	978-4-06-523897-4	December 31, 2024 (digital); April 7, 2026 (omnibus)	978-1-68-491763-1 (digital); 979-8-88877-500-4 (omnibus)
48. "A Bullet for the Enemy Marksmen" (敵銃士を狙え!, Teki Jūshi o Nerae!); 49. "Hard-Pressed" (肉薄!, Nikuhaku!); 50. "A New Weapon" (新兵器, Shin Heiki); 51. "Comings and Goings" (去来, Kyorai); 52. "Beast" (獣(ケダモノ), Kedamono); 53. "Concord" (渾然(こんぜん), Konzen)
12	January 21, 2022	978-4-06-526463-8	March 18, 2025 (digital); April 7, 2026 (omnibus)	978-1-68-491764-8 (digital); 979-8-88877-500-4 (omnibus)
54. "Pitfall" (陥穽(かんせい), Kansei); 55. "Two Steps Ahead" (先の先, Saki no Saki); 56. "Marksman vs. Marksman" (狙撃戦, Sogeki-sen); 57. "Gunshot" (銃の声, Jū no Koe); 58. "Reunion" (再会, Saikai); 59. "Dread" (恐怖, Kyōfu)
13	July 22, 2022	978-4-06-528301-1	July 15, 2025 (digital); August 11, 2026 (omnibus)	978-1-68-491765-5 (digital); 979-8-88877-501-1 (omnibus)
60. "Untamed" (野放図, Nohōzu); 61. "Shock" (驚異, Kyōi); 62. "The Great Cannon" (大砲撃, Dai Hōgeki); 63. "He Laughs on the Battlefield" (戦場で笑う男, Senjō de Warau Otoko); 64. "Target the Viscount!" (ヴィスコンデを狙え!!, Visukonde o Nerae!!); 65. "His Life on the Line" (肉弾, Nikudan)
14	December 22, 2022	978-4-06-529787-2	August 11, 2026 (digital); August 11, 2026 (omnibus)	979-8-88933-654-9 (digital); 979-8-88877-501-1 (omnibus)
66. "New Cannon" (新型大砲, Shingata Taihō); 67. "A Contest with Time" (時間勝負, Jikan Shōbu); 68. "The Baron and the Hound" (男爵と犬, Danshaku to Inu); 69. "Fording the Flood" (激流を越えて, Gekiryū o Koete); 70. "Shatter the Fortress!" (要塞を破壊せよ!, Yōsai o Hakai Seyo!)
15	May 23, 2023	978-4-06-531432-6	November 10, 2026 (digital); November 10, 2026 (omnibus)	979-8-89478-478-6 (digital); 979-8-88877-502-8 (omnibus)
71. "Escape the Fortress!" (要塞(ようさい)から脱出せよ!, Yōsai kara Dasshutsu Seyo!); 72. "Dunces" (痴(し)れ者, Shiremono); 73. "Oath" (誓い, Chikai); 74. "The Port of Saint-Malo" (港町サン・マロ, Minatomachi San Maro); 75. "Smuggled by Boat" (密輸船, Mitsuyu-sen)
16	November 22, 2023	978-4-06-533623-6	November 10, 2026 (digital); November 10, 2026 (omnibus)	979-8-89478-479-3 (digital); 979-8-88877-502-8 (omnibus)
76. "The Friar" (修道士, Shūdō-shi); 77. "A New Army" (新たな軍勢, Aratana Gunzei); 78. "Halt the French Army's Advance!" (フランス軍進軍を阻止せよ!, Furansu-gun Shingun o Soshi Seyo!); 79. "De Fauve's Mansion" (ド・フォーブの館, Do Fōbu no Yakata); 80. "Jonas's Choice" (ヨナスの覚悟, Yonasu no Kakugo); 81. "Breakout" (奪還, Dakkan)
17	May 22, 2024	978-4-06-535398-1	March 16, 2027 (omnibus)	979-8-88877-570-7 (omnibus)
82. Tairan e no Gōhō (大乱への号砲); 83. Keiryaku (計略); 84. Hiya (火矢); 85. Jūjika (十字架); 86. Bundan (分断); 87. Uragiri (裏切り)
18	November 21, 2024	978-4-06-537504-4	March 16, 2027 (omnibus)	979-8-88877-570-7 (omnibus)
88. Tō no Ue no Akuma (塔の上の悪魔); 89. Yōjō no Ketsui (洋上の決意); 90. Kisen (機先); 91. Tōnai no Shitō (塔内の死闘); 92. Hōkai (崩壊); 93. Sunahama no Ashiato (砂浜の足跡)
19	June 23, 2025	978-4-06-539258-4	March 16, 2027 (omnibus)	979-8-88877-570-7 (omnibus)
94. Namari no Heitai (鉛の兵隊); 95. Munen (無念); 96. Būjēru-jō (ブージェール城); 97. Kessen (血戦); 98. Shin to Jin (信(シン)と盡(ジン)); 99. Unmei no Wakaremichi (運命の分かれ道); 100. Risōkyō (理想郷)

== Reception ==
Issak was one of the Jury Recommended Works at the 21st Japan Media Arts Festival in 2018. It won the Saito Takao Award 2019, established by manga artist Takao Saito and the Saito Takao Gekiga Cultural Foundation. The English translation by Kevin Steinbach was nominated for the Japan Society and Anime NYC's first American Manga Awards in the Best Translation category in 2024.

== See also ==
- Yugo, another manga series written by Shinji Makari
- Until Death Do Us Part, another manga series illustrated by Double-S
