= Until Death Do Us Part (manga) =

Japanese manga series

- First volume cover, featuring Mamoru Hijikata (back) and Haruka Tōyama (front)

死がふたりを分かつまで (Shi ga Futari o Wakatsu made)
- Genre: Science fiction
- Manga
- Written by: Hiroshi Takashige
- Illustrated by: Double-S
- Published by: Square Enix
- English publisher: NA: Yen Press
- Magazine: Young Gangan
- Original run: June 3, 2005 – November 20, 2015
- Volumes: 26
- icon

Until Death Do Us Part (Japanese: 死がふたりを分かつまで, Hepburn: Shi ga Futari o Wakatsu made) is a Japanese manga series written by Hiroshi Takashige and illustrated by Double-S. It was serialized in Square Enix's seinen manga magazine Young Gangan from June 2005 to November 2015. The story centers around a young girl with strong precognitive abilities. Due to these abilities, she is held hostage by a Yakuza group looking to make a profit off of them. However, knowing what was to come, she spots a blind swordsman in the crowd and immediately recognizes him as her only way out. She hires him to protect her "until death do us part", and thus begins a long road of action-packed confrontations to keep the young girl safe and her abilities out of the hands of those who would exploit them.

== Plot ==
Haruka Tōyama, a young girl, is kidnapped by agents of a company named Ex-Solid due to her precognition abilities. She quickly finds sanctuary with a man named Hijikata Mamoru, a blind swordsman, Koryu swordsmanship master and also an ex-kendoka, and convict who is proficient in the use of a katana, and desperately runs him down in the street. Upon meeting, Haruka told Hijikata to protect her "Until Death Do Us Part." Confirming the terms of the contract, Mamoru quickly dispatches the pursuers on her tail and took her in for protection.

Soon it becomes apparent, however, that nearly the entire underground is targeting Haruka. It is then up to Mamoru, and his partner Igawa, to provide consistent and unending protection for Haruka. Needing a bit more help, contact is made with their parent company, a secret and elite vigilante paramilitary group called the Element Network. Many different members of the Network get involved in protecting Haruka and placing her under EN protection from unknown forces who seek her ability. In turn, Haruka assists EN forces in defeating mercenaries and assassins who are out to get her and the network.

== Characters ==
Main cast of Until Death Do Us Part. Foreground: Mamoru Hijikata; Rear: Igawa Ryōtarō and Haruka Tōyama.

=== Blade ===
Mamoru Hijikata (土方 護, Hijikata Mamoru)
The protagonist. Despite how he is almost blind, he is a kenjutsu master. That use many koryu school sword style. not only mugai ryu as his main sword style, but also itto ryu (whom he killed his teacher, makabe), nen ryu, shinkage ryu. To compensate for his vision, he uses glasses that project a wire-frame model of his surroundings onto his retinas. He mainly fights with a katana hidden inside his walking stick.
Haruka Tōyama (遠山 遥, Tōyama Haruka)
The female lead, who is 12 years old at the start of the series. She uses the fake identity "Haruna Tachibana", posing as Sierra's daughter.
Ryōtarō Igawa (井川 良太郎, Igawa Ryōtarō)
Mamoru's teammate, and deals with the technical aspects of Blade's operations.
Dai Ibuki (伊吹 大, Ibuki Dai)
A newly assigned Blade member.

=== The Wall ===
Alpha (アルファ, Arufa)
The leader of the Element Network's international anti-crime unit, The Wall. His real name is Jack Garvey (ジャック・ガービー, Jakku Gābī).
India (インディア, India)
An ex-Marine who joins The Wall after losing his child to a terrorist.
Juliet (ジュリエット, Jurietto)
Specializes in infiltration, and looks after Haruka in Sierra's absence.
Kilo (キロ, Kiro)
Specializes in covert ops, using knives, and is Sierra's ex-husband.
Sierra (シエラ, Shiera)
The mother of Cindy and ex-wife of Kilo, and a member of The Wall. Her real name is Serena (セリーナ, Serīna).

=== Others ===
Teppei Genda (源田鉄平, Genda Teppei)
A detective assigned to solving the attacks Mamoru caused when protecting Haruka.
Inaba Tesshuu (稲葉, Inaba)
Mamoru's kendo teacher.
Makabe (真壁, Makabe)
Mamoru's itto-ryu swordsmanship teacher, a sword lunatic that trapped Mamoru to end his life in a sword fight to the death.
Tatsumi Daiba (台場 巽, Daiba Tatsumi)
The wealthy manager of Element Network, famous for having created the search engine MENTOR. He also appears in Takashige's Alcbane.
Aegis (イージス, Aegis)
Called "The Praetorian": the strongest underground bodyguard, capable of deflecting any bullet. He also appears in Aegis in the Dark.
Senji Tamagawa (玉川 千冶, Tamagawa Senji)
A swordsman and a member of the Yakuza in Kakuhōkai.
Pyro (パイロ, Pairo)
A man who is ordered by Daiba to support Haruka from behind the scenes.
Anna Riddle (アナ・リドル, Ana Ridoru)
The broker of "Aegis", and only provides service to clients who can answer her riddles. She also appears in Aegis in the Dark.
Jesus (ジーザス, Jīzasu)
An underground hitman who seeks his kidnapped pupil. He also appears in Jesus.
Luna
The second-in-command of The Canes Venatici in Chechnya.
Shot
A member of the UDDUP team, and one of the top elites in charge of South Africa.

=== Antagonists ===
==== The Republic of Galboa ====
Zashid Turus
He is the substantial controller "hero" of Galboa and Duhana though also the backbone to the country's black ops. A person whose alas is called "Mr. Dark Side" in the underworld and Gene's real father (chapter 156).
For generations, his ancestors have been a freak family that's been testing tons of possibilities. Brought into existence from various lineages of beings of superior physical strength, intelligence, and speed, and the result is Zashid Turus (chapter 176). Since he is the pinnacle of superhuman, he plans to clone himself (chapter 179) and add Haruka's clairvoyance into the mix (chapter 180).
Other than his four likely successors (Edge, Taos, Gido, and Misalt), Gene and Fen, he has many children who don't fight or are women. There are rumors that he has over 100 children (chapter 176).
Zashid, after being severely wounded by Mamoru, requests Haruka to look after Galboa and Duhana (chapter 213). He agrees to all her conditions and grants her full authority, with Gene as his successor.
Edge Turus (エジー・トゥルス, Ejī Turusu)
He is the Galboa ambassador to Japan. He had plans to kidnap Haruka due to her precognitive abilities as well as the EX-SOLID biochip. Since then, he has been obsessed over kidnapping Haruka. He was disabled by Mamoru when he sliced his right arm after Alpha led 'The Wall' commandos to storm a freighter he used to meet with Mamoru (chapter 22). Later on, Mamoru cut off his left arm (chapter 74). After the incident, Komura took over Edge's position. He currently hospitalized (chapter 100 and after). Gene gave him the prosthetic arm that was stolen (chapter 100).
With artificial left arm and right leg and what supposed to be Aegis's new right arm, Edge is able to fight Aegis and Genda while standing up (chapter 151) but was ultimately defeated and captured (chapter 153). Mamoru uses the captured Edge to start an internal dispute within Duhana and against Zashid for what Edge did to Haruka (chapter 176). He is "rescued" by Gido in chapter 197 where Edge got new limbs in Dante 313 (chapter 199, chapter 206) though the limbs were imperfect, as seen in chapter 214.
As punishment for attacking Haruka, Mamoru performs "Kubi-jochin", leaving Edge half-alive and half-dead (chapter 214). If he moves even an inch, he will die.
He is one of Zashid's sons and one of the four sons to become his successor (chapter 176). He controls the southern part of Duhana.
Fang (牙(ファング), Fangu)
He is one of Zashid's sons and an assassin hired by Edge. He has a strong interest in Mamoru. He uses portable, computerized mini helicopters armed with turrets to fight Mamoru. However, Igawa sees through it and was able to find him. It is later revealed that he is Edge's half-brother. He is killed by acquaintances in the end, as per his wishes, escaping his nightmares of being killed by Mamoru or other assassins (chapter 42).
Taos Turus
He is one of Zashid's sons and one of the four sons to become his successor (chapter 176). He controls the northern part of Duhana. He is captured by UDDUP (chapter 180) but is rescued by Misalt (chapter 204).
Gido Turus
He is one of Zashid's sons and one of the four sons to become his successor (chapter 176). He controls the western part of Duhana. He wears an eyepatch on his left eye (chapter 191). He doesn't fear Zashid. He is the Minister of Defense (chapter 196).
Jill
Zashid's fifth wife and chief physician in the Court (chapter 204).

===== White Unit =====
Misalt Turus
He is one of Zashid's sons and one of the four sons to become his successor (chapter 176). He controls the eastern part of Duhana. The unit he commands, the White Unit, the similar to the Black Unit of the Duhana state (chapter 185). He is in charge of their intelligence agency (chapter 186). He is defeated by Mamoru in chapter 199.

==== Duhana Semi-State ====
Gene Turus
He is Edge's younger "brother" and works for Plunder. He is from the Duhana semi-state and is the leader of its special forces, particularly the "Trump" group, which consists of seven members. He was the one responsible for stealing Aegis's arm as a gift for Edge (chapter 100). He was trained by Zelm (chapter 145). He wears a headset connected to a PDA. He is one of Zashid's sons (chapter 176).

==== Trump (The Black Unit) ====
Zelm
He is one of the members of "Trump". He is known as "Death Instructor Zelm". Whether as a soldier or as an instructor, he's the best. He has a talent for devising new methods of murder. All of Trump's soldiers are his students. He uses a cane that fires needle shaped objects at a speed of 40 meters per second (130 ft/s). The range is about 4 meters (13 ft). He knew Tiger back in the day and respected her (chapter 144). Since Mamoru cuts off his left arm in chapter 143, he let the others capture him (chapter 148).
Sidabra
He is the sniper of "Trump".
Dega
He is one of the members of "Trump". He is using two balls made of special high-tech material during his fight with Jesus (chapter 121).
Wau
He is one of the members of "Trump". He fights with hardened ceramic knuckles (chapter 121).
N'Sinh
He is one of the members of "Trump". He fights with nearly invisible boomerangs (chapter 125). He got severely injured by Yijian in chapter 125.
Gara
He is very tall member of "Trump". He uses chemicals, one which creates hard foam on contact while the other freezes the foam into ice. Both of them combined create a MDS (Mobility Denial System) weapon. The gel is a non-lethal weapon, originally conceived to stop vehicles, creating an adhesion coefficient of the ice (chapter 132). He got his right arm broken by Mamoru in chapter 133.
Tebor
He is one of the members of "Trump". He uses a Geometric Optics cloak to be invisible (chapter 118). Kaeser figured out that he is not one person but two invisible people (chapter 146–147). Tebor is the female while Teboul is the male.

==== 24 ====
Kaeser
He is the operating unit Night Gaunts. He is presumably the platoon leader of 24. He is the sniper with the alias Jouji Kaieda at the school Jesus works at.
Ragi
She is one of the members of 24. She is the sniper with the alias Naomi Ragi at the school Jesus works at.
Ash
She is one of the members of 24. She is the sniper with the alias Ashford Manami at the school Jesus works at. She is the disciple of a woman named Tiger.
Yijian Liu
He is one of the members of 24. He is the assassin with the alias Kensuke Itou at the school Jesus works at. He is the head of the Chinese mafia "Dragon Gate", even recognized as the organization's top assassin.

==== Others ====
Mister Wiseman
To the general public, he is Thomas Jefferson (トーマス・ジェファーソン, Tōmasu Jefāson), a former college professor and expert on crime, but he is actually a renowned and respected criminal in disguise. He is known as Mr. Wiseman, the man who taught Edge (chapter 44).
His financial power is best described as frightening as he looks down on the 100 million dollar bounty, calling it "mundane".
Komura (古村, Komura)
The Kakuhōkai Yakuza clan's waka gashira, an overseer and the second in command. He was present during Mamoru's raid of the Kakuhōkai's Tokyo branch and vowed to take revenge on the swordsman down ever since. He was allied with Edge Turus and Mister Wiseman and replaced Edge's position. He sometimes goes by the name "Professor". Even though he uses handguns, he is still accurate with a sniper rifle (chapter 197).
In recent chapters, he was found by Mamoru and nearly killed, but Aegis was hired by Daiba Tatsumi to prevent Mamoru from killing him. After Aegis told him to go to jail or both of them would be after him, he turned himself in for illegally possessing a gun (chapter 92–169).
Orion
A black market organ seller in Chechnya from 3 years ago before Mamoru lost his sight. He harvests organs from poor children. He thinks the Element Network is a fairy tale. He was captured by Jesus in chapter 109.

== Publication ==
Written by Hiroshi Takashige and illustrated by Double-S, Until Death Do Us Part was serialized in Square Enix's seinen manga magazine Young Gangan from June 3, 2005, to November 20, 2015. Square Enix compiled its chapters in 26 tankōbon volumes, published between December 24, 2005, and February 25, 2016.

In France and other French-speaking countries and territories, it is being published by Editions Ki-oon under the title Jusqu'à ce que la mort nous sépare with its 1st volume published on March 27, 2008. In South Korea, it is published under Haksan. It is published in Taiwan under Tong Li. It is published in Hong Kong by Jade Dynasty. It is published in Indonesia by Elex Media. It is published in Italy by J-Pop. It has been licensed for English language release by Yen Press, who released the series in a 2-in-1 omnibus format.

=== Volume list ===
No.	Original release date	Original ISBN	English release date	English ISBN
1	December 24, 2005	978-4-7575-1594-9	May 29, 2012	978-0-31621-390-5
2	June 24, 2006	978-4-7575-1685-4	May 29, 2012	978-0-31621-390-5
3	October 25, 2006	978-4-7575-1802-5	September 25, 2012	978-0-31621-708-8
4	February 23, 2007	978-4-7575-1836-0	September 25, 2012	978-0-31621-708-8
5	June 25, 2007	978-4-7575-2030-1	February 26, 2013	978-0-31621-710-1
6	October 25, 2007	978-4-7575-2150-6	February 26, 2013	978-0-31621-710-1
7	May 24, 2008	978-4-7575-2280-0	July 23, 2013	978-0-31622-428-4
8	November 25, 2008	978-4-7575-2431-6	July 23, 2013	978-0-31622-428-4
9	March 25, 2009	978-4-7575-2686-0	December 17, 2013	978-0-31622-429-1
10	September 25, 2009	978-4-7575-2684-6	December 17, 2013	978-0-31622-429-1
11	February 27, 2010	978-4-7575-2810-9	May 27, 2014	978-0-31622-430-7
12	June 25, 2010	978-4-7575-2912-0	May 27, 2014	978-0-31622-430-7
13	November 25, 2010	978-4-7575-3036-2	September 23, 2014	978-0-31622-431-4
14	March 25, 2011	978-4-7575-3172-7	September 23, 2014	978-0-31622-431-4
15	July 25, 2011	978-4-7575-3296-0	January 20, 2015	978-0-31625-934-7
16	January 25, 2012	978-4-7575-3485-8	January 20, 2015	978-0-31625-934-7
17	April 25, 2012	978-4-7575-3573-2	May 19, 2015	978-0-31634-021-2
18	September 25, 2012	978-4-7575-3739-2	May 19, 2015	978-0-31634-021-2
19	January 25, 2013	978-4-7575-2018-9	September 22, 2015	978-0-31634-022-9
20	May 25, 2013	978-4-7575-3975-4	September 22, 2015	978-0-31634-022-9
21	September 25, 2013	978-4-7575-4082-8	January 26, 2016	978-0-31634-023-6
22	January 25, 2014	978-4-7575-4210-5	January 26, 2016	978-0-31634-023-6
23	June 25, 2014	978-4-7575-4341-6	May 24, 2016	978-0-31627-216-2
24	November 25, 2014	978-4-7575-4477-2	May 24, 2016	978-0-31627-216-2
25	July 25, 2015	978-4-7575-4622-6	November 22, 2016	978-0-31654-774-1
26	February 25, 2016	978-4-7575-4892-3	November 22, 2016	978-0-31654-774-1

== See also ==
- Issak, another manga series illustrated by Double-S
