= D-Live!! =

Japanese manga series

- First tankōbon volume cover, featuring Satoru Ikaruga riding a Jet Ski
- Genre: Adventure
- Manga
- Written by: Ryōji Minagawa
- Published by: Shogakukan
- Imprint: Shōnen Sunday Comics Special
- Magazine: Weekly Shōnen Sunday
- Original run: October 2, 2002 – April 5, 2006
- Volumes: 15
- icon

D-Live!! (stylized as D-LIVE!!) is a Japanese manga series written and illustrated by Ryōji Minagawa. It was serialized in shōnen manga magazine Weekly Shōnen Sunday from October 2002 to April 2006, with its chapters collected in 15 tankōbon volumes. The story follows Satoru Ikaruga, a high school student nicknamed the "Genius Driver". He can operate almost any vehicle and works for a multinational specialist company called the Almighty Support Enterprise (ASE). ASE hires Ikaruga whenever they are assigned a case involving vehicle driving. He usually works with other ASE agents to resolve these situations.

== Plot ==
Satoru Ikaruga is an ordinary high school student. Most of his classmates and teachers do not know that he is an operative of the Almighty Support Enterprise (ASE), specializing in vehicle driving. He is deployed worldwide, supported by ASE agents as he accomplishes cases assigned to him by clients.

== Characters ==
Satoru Ikaruga (斑鳩 悟, Ikaru Satoru)
A high school boy who does part-time jobs with ASE Japan Branch as a vehicle driver specialist. His father was a friend of Hajime Mozu and also an ASE driver who died in doing his job.
Hatsune Shimizu (清水 初音, Shimizu Hatsune)
A high school girl, the mechanic specialist of ASE Japan Branch. Her dream is to make her late father's motorcycle racing team win the Suzuka 8 Hours endurance race. She almost made it with Satoru riding her bike, but an accident happened that made Satoru did not finish the race.
Hajime Mozu (百舌鳥 創, Mozu Hajime)
Chief of ASE Japan branch. He is an ex-ASE vehicle driver specialist, Satoru was trained by him. He is sometimes cruel to Satoru by cutting his payment if Satoru made any mistake in doing his job.
Clever Owl (クレーバー・オウル, Kurēbā Ōru)
He is ASE USA branch's specialist in spying and infiltrating. He is also a playboy and thinks that he is the next James Bond. He always gets sick if traveling in a vehicle, especially if the driver is Satoru. Only Mozu can make him not sick in a vehicle.
Rika Karasuma (烏丸 理香, Karasuma Rika)
ASE Japan Branch's specialist of geology. She is lecturer in a university in Japan.
James Hato (ジェームズ・波戸, Jēmuzu Hato)
He is ASE USA branch's specialist in detonating bomb and CQB. An ex-SWAT Team member. Joined ASE after Satoru saved him from an exploded building he was trapped.

== Publication ==
Written and illustrated by Ryōji Minagawa, D-Live!! was serialized in Shogakukan's shōnen manga magazine Weekly Shōnen Sunday from October 16, 2002, to April 19, 2006. (Note: It started in the magazine's 44th issue of 2002 (cover dated October 16), released on October 2 of that same year. It finished in the magazine's 18th issue of 2006 (cover dated April 19), released on April 5 of that same year.) Shogakukan collected its chapters in 15 tankōbon volumes, released from March 18, 2003, to August 11, 2006.

== Reception ==
D-Live!! was one of the Jury Recommended Works at the ninth Japan Media Arts Festival in 2005.
