= Spriggan (manga) =

Japanese manga series and its adaptations

- Manga volume 1 cover, featuring Yu Ominae

スプリガン (Supurigan)
- Genre: Action; Science fiction; Thriller
- Manga
- Written by: Hiroshi Takashige
- Illustrated by: Ryōji Minagawa
- Published by: Shogakukan
- English publisher: NA: Viz Media (former); Seven Seas Entertainment; SG: Chuang Yi
- Imprint: Shōnen Sunday Comics Special
- Magazine: Weekly Shōnen Sunday; (1989); Shōnen Sunday Zōkan; (1992–1996)
- Original run: February 22, 1989 – February 5, 1996
- Volumes: 11 + 1 extra
- Anime film
- Directed by: Hirotsugu Kawasaki
- Produced by: Kazuhiko Ikeguchi; Kazuya Hamana; Haruo Sai; Eiko Tanaka; Ayao Ueda
- Written by: Katsuhiro Otomo (Note: Story composition (構成)); Hirotsugu Kawasaki (Note: Screenplay (脚本)); Yasutaka Itou
- Music by: Kuniaki Haishima
- Studio: Studio 4°C
- Licensed by: NA: ADV Films
- Released: September 5, 1998
- Runtime: 91 minutes
- Video game

Spriggan: Lunar Verse
- Developer: From Liquid Mirror Software
- Publisher: FromSoftware
- Genre: Action, adventure
- Platform: PlayStation
- Released: June 17, 1999
- Original net animation
- Directed by: Hiroshi Kobayashi
- Produced by: Junichi Kaseda; Kento Yoshida; Hirotsugu Oogo; Yoshito Hayano; Tatsuya Satou; Takuya Matsumoto; Shuuichirou Tanaka; Mikito Bizenjima; Hiromi Uno
- Written by: Hiroshi Seko
- Music by: Taisei Iwasaki
- Studio: David Production
- Licensed by: Netflix
- Released: June 18, 2022
- Runtime: 45 minutes
- Episodes: 6
- icon

Spriggan (Japanese: スプリガン, Hepburn: Supurigan) (stylized in all caps) is a Japanese manga series written by Hiroshi Takashige and illustrated by Ryōji Minagawa. It was serialized in Shogakukan's shōnen manga magazines Weekly Shōnen Sunday and Shōnen Sunday Zōkan from 1989 to 1996, with its chapters collected in 11 tankōbon volumes. In North America, the manga was first licensed by Viz Media, under the title Striker; it was serialized in Manga Vizion and only three volumes were released in the late '90s. The manga was licensed by Seven Seas Entertainment, with its original title, in 2022.

Spriggan takes place in the last years of the Cold War where mysterious and unknown artifacts called out-of-place artifacts (OOPArt) are discovered in various parts of the world, leading to a secret war between various forces against the ARCAM Corporation, an organization that placed itself as the guardians of the OOPArts in order to prevent them from being used as weapons.

The manga was adapted into an anime film by Studio 4°C in 1998; Katsuhiro Otomo was involved in adapting. A PlayStation game called Spriggan: Lunar Verse was also based on the manga with some material created for the game. An original net animation (ONA) series adaptation by David Production was released in June 2022 on Netflix.

== Plot ==
An ancient civilization known for their advanced technology once ruled Earth, but were destroyed in the end by their misuse. They left messages for later generations in the form of indestructible message plates written in ancient Hebrew, informing them that if they could not find a good use for their creations, they should be destroyed.

Various paramilitaries, national armies, and armed private forces began to secretly search for these "mysterious artifacts" in order to be used for their own good and against their enemies. The ARCAM Corporation and their military arm, the ARCAM Private Army, aim to stop these forces from destroying themselves with their elite secret agents known as Spriggans (or Strikers).

== Media ==
=== Manga ===
Written by Hiroshi Takashige and illustrated by Ryōji Minagawa, Spriggan was first serialized in Shogakukan's shōnen manga magazine Weekly Shōnen Sunday from February 22 to December 6, 1989. The manga was then transferred to Shōnen Sunday Zōkan (renamed Shōnen Sunday Super in 1995), where it ran from August 15, 1992, to February 5, 1996. Eleven tankōbon volumes were released from June 18, 1991, to June 18, 1996, with eight-volume reprints from April 18, 2001, to June 18, 2002, and from June 15, 2006, to January 13, 2007. The reprints included the previously unpublished stories "First Mission" and "Gold Rush" in the first and last volumes, respectively. The original volumes were republished in a three-box set edition, which includes never before published illustrations. The first box set (including the first four volumes) was released on April 18, 2022. The third box set includes a 12th volume, which features the "First Mission" and "Gold Rush" stories, and was published on June 17, 2022.

In North America, the series was first licensed by Viz Media, under the title Striker, and serialized in Manga Vizion. Three volumes were published from November 5, 1998, to May 6, 1999, before the company curtailed further translation. In February 2022, Seven Seas Entertainment announced they acquired the rights to publish the series in English, with its original title. They released the series in four volumes from June 16, 2022, to June 27, 2023.

In Europe, two volumes were published in France and in French-speaking countries and territories by Glénat under the name Striker in the Netherlands by Big Balloon, eleven volumes in Germany by Planet Manga, and three full volume in Spain and in Spanish-speaking territories and countries by Planeta DeAgostini in 1993 followed by a reprint from 1996 to 1997 with another reprint announced on July 15, 2021, via its Spanish Twitter account. Together with Ranma ½, it was the first manga published in Portugal, by Texto Editora in 1995.

In Asia, the manga was released in Hong Kong by Jade Dynasty, in Indonesia by Elex Media Komputindo, in Singapore it was released by Chuang Yi in English, in South Korea by Daiwon C.I., in Taiwan by Tong Li Comics, and in Thailand by Siam Inter Comics.

==== Volumes ====
Japanese tankōbon edition

No.	Japanese release date	Japanese ISBN
1	June 18, 1991	4-09-122591-8
2	August 9, 1991	4-09-122592-6
3	September 18, 1992	4-09-122593-4
4	March 18, 1993	4-09-122594-2
5	August 10, 1993	4-09-122595-0
6	May 18, 1994	4-09-122596-9
7	August 10, 1994	4-09-122597-7
8	March 18, 1995	4-09-122598-5
9	August 10, 1995	4-09-122599-3
10	March 18, 1996	4-09-122600-0
11	June 18, 1996	4-09-122836-4
12	June 17, 2022	4-09-943108-8

North American deluxe edition

No.	English release date	English ISBN
1	June 16, 2022 (digital); August 30, 2022 (print)	978-1-63858-579-4
2	December 6, 2022	978-1-63858-749-1
3	February 28, 2023	978-1-63858-917-4
4	June 27, 2023	978-1-68579-527-6

=== Film ===
A film adaptation of the manga, using the Noah's Ark story, was produced by Studio 4°C and released by Toho. The movie was directed and story boarded by Hirotsugu Kawasaki, written by Kawasaki and Yasutaka Itō, and supervised by Katsuhiro Otomo. Hiroshi Takashige and Ryoji Minagawa had a hand in assisting the director through production. It made around 350 million yen during its debut in Japanese theaters.

A Japanese release of the film on DVD was released by Bandai Visual under their Emotion label on April 25, 1999. ADV Films released the film in a limited theatrical release in the United States on October 12, 2001 and on DVD in all English-speaking countries outside Asia on April 23, 2002, with a special edition released on February 15, 2005, with the exception of Australia and New Zealand, where the film was distributed by Madman Entertainment.

The film was distributed in Hong Kong and some other Asian countries under Neovision and released in Taiwan by Proware Multimedia International. In Europe, it was produced in German by Anime Connection of Germany, in Russian by MC Entertainment, in Dutch by Dybex, Italian by Dynit, in Polish by IDG and in Swedish by Sandrew Metronome.

Spriggan was released in Japan on Blu-ray Disc format on November 11, 2007, with another release on July 25, 2008.

=== Video games ===
PlayStation cover of Spriggan: Lunar Verse

On June 16, 1999, FromSoftware released Spriggan: Lunar Verse, a video game adaptation for the PlayStation in Japan. It can be played by either one or two players. It was a 3D action-adventure game, and it anticipated design elements which were later popularized by action games such as the Devil May Cry series and modern Ninja Gaiden games.

A soundtrack of the game, composed by Keiichiro Segawa, Tsukasa Saito, and Yuji Kanda, was released by Absord Music Japan and distributed by King Records on November 26, 1999. It has a total of 27 tracks.

In September 2023, Sega announced a collaborative event with the series for the Phantasy Star Online 2: New Genesis update on October 18 of the same year, which included Spriggan-related items.

=== Original net animation ===
An original net animation (ONA) series adaptation was announced in March 2019. The series was animated by David Production, directed by Hiroshi Kobayashi, with Hiroshi Seko handling series' composition, Shūhei Handa designing the characters, and Taisei Iwasaki composing the music. Shōhei Miyake serves as the assistant director. Originally set for a release on Netflix in 2021, it was moved to a 2022 premiere on the streaming platform. The six-episode series' debuted on Netflix on June 18, 2022; it is part of a partnership with Netflix to have the anime streamed worldwide. The opening theme is "Seeking the Truth feat. YAHZARAH", while the ending theme is "Ancient Creations feat. Shing02", both by Taisei Iwasaki. The series was broadcast in Japan on Tokyo MX and Mētele from July to September 2023.

A special screening for the ONA was held on June 17, 2023, at the Toho Cinema Hibiya in Tokyo, where Chiaki Kobayashi, Yohei Azakami and Mariya Ise appeared for the event.

The original soundtrack, composed by Iwasaki, was released by Milan Records on the same date of the series debut, on June 18, 2022. A guidebook for the ONA was released on July 20, 2022. The guidebook features interviews with the cast, staff and authors Hiroshi Takashige and Ryoji Minagawa, detailed information of the series and various artworks.

No.	Title	Directed by	Storyboarded by	Original release date
1	"Flame Serpent"	Shouhei Miyake	Hiroshi Kobayashi	June 18, 2022
2	"Noah's Ark"	Shouhei Miyake	Shouhei Miyake	June 18, 2022
3	"The Forest of No Return"	Toshiyuki Katou; Shingo Tanabe	Toshiyuki Katou	June 18, 2022
4	"Berserker"	Shimoriko Nagai	Hiroshi Kobayashi	June 18, 2022
5	"The Crystal Skull"	Shouhei Miyake; Shigeki Awai; Hisashi Sugawara; Shinji Osada	Shinji Osada	June 18, 2022
6	"The Forgotten Kingdom"	Shinji Osada	Hiroshi Kobayashi; Koichi Chigira	June 18, 2022

== Reception ==
=== Film ===
Wilma Jandoc, reviewing the film adaptation in the Honolulu Star-Bulletin, wrote that it primarily stands out through its portrayal of the United States, which plays an antagonistic role. Jandoc described the depiction of "the U.S. leadership" as "at once so mismatched and perfect that it's funny", approving of their portrayal as power-hungry but expressing disbelief at the concept of the U.S. government being deeply concerned about the environment. At the same time, Jandoc remarked that "any other country could have been put in its place—Russia, China, North Korea—and still it would have just been a nation's name, nothing more", feeling that an opportunity for more substantial criticism was missed.

=== Original net animation ===
On June 23, 2022, Netflix Japan reported that the Spriggan ONA ranked first on their "Today's Top 10 TV Shows".

Kenneth Seward Jr. of IGN said that the ONA "has the potential to be a great anime", praising the voice acting, action and premise, but commented that "its open-ended nature might not win over newcomers", and that its "[i]nconsistent animation also hinders what could've been one of the better Netflix-produced anime released this year."
