= List of Hayate the Combat Butler characters =

A Hayate the Combat Butler characters illustration wallpaper

This article lists the characters from the Japanese manga and anime series Hayate the Combat Butler.

== Ayasaki household ==
Hayate Ayasaki (綾崎 ハヤテ, Ayasaki Hayate)
Voiced by: Ryoko Shiraishi, Muriel Hofmann (English), Jonel Bituin (Filipino)
Hayate is the title protagonist 16-year-old butler of the Sanzenin family. Hayate Ayasaki has had to work to support his parents' bad habits since the age of nine, always moving from job to job, before he was found out to be underaged. The experience gained in those days does mean, however, that of all the characters, he possesses the most extensive practical knowledge of how the world operates. Hayate's dad refused to get employed, while his mother is a compulsive gambler, and the whereabouts of his older brother, Ikusa, were unknown. These events led to their bankruptcy—they abandoned Hayate and made an attempt to sell him to the Yakuza to ease their financial burdens on Christmas Eve, a debt of 156,804,000 yen. With not many choices left to him, Hayate conspired to kidnap someone to get ransom money. He found a girl, Nagi Sanzenin, and told her that he would kidnap her. However, Nagi mistook his words for confession of love, so he was later employed as Nagi's new butler. As a butler, Hayate is capable of all aspects of housework, but it is his ability to repelling attacks from almost anything (despite his bad luck) that makes him a "combat butler". He once demonstrated a skilled use of firearms (being able to wield an MG3 single-handedly) and is practically invincible with physical powers far surpassing that of any normal human being. At the beginning of the story, Hayate often mentioned Nello and Patrasche from the novel A Dog of Flanders, and compared his miserable situation to the characters' life.

In addition to looking poor and needy, Hayate can also appear to be extremely feminine. This has led to him being forced to wear girls' clothing or cosplay in feminine outfits such as nekomimi, a maid, and so on. Later on, this female alter-ego is given a name: Hermione Ayasaki (綾崎 ハーマイオニー Ayasaki Hamaioni). He has been forced to cross-dress at other times.

Hayate had a girlfriend named Athena, who was responsible for teaching him cleaning and swordsmanship, as well as for building his strong body. Athena taught him that he must be economically strong if he wants to date a girl. They had a falling out after his parents pawned an "engagement" ring she gave him. In chapter 239, after being asked by Hinagiku how he feels about Athena, Hayate describes Athena as "Not like the others," and ultimately tells Hinagiku that he is in love with Athena. Athena would soon be possessed by King Midas and attack Hayate. Isumi and Sakuya explained to Hayate about Athena's possession and the importance of the King's Jewel. However, Hayate was unable to choose whether to keep the stone for Nagi's inheritance or to destroy it to save Athena. In the end, it was Nagi who made the choice, noticing Hayate's troubles. She destroyed the King's Jewel and Hayate was able to beat King Midas and rescue Athena. Both of them quickly embraced each other, after a long time since 10 years ago. Athena told Hayate of what happened after he left, about how a man came to save and free her from The Royal Garden. Hayate immediately recognized the man as his brother Ikusa. After these events, he tells him that she is the one he loved (in the past tense), and he comes to deciding he wants to protect Nagi. Hayate would go back to Mykonos for one more day of vacation before returning to Japan.

Back in Japan, Hayate had to deal with the problem of Nagi losing the inheritance of the mansion. In the end, Hayate met Klaus who showed him an old house, "Violet Mansion" where they will settle in. After that, Athena appeared again in chapter 300, to ask Hayate where his brother was. She told him that she would appear again and that he should act as they had never met before. She also stated that Hayate was the one she trusted most. When Hayate saves Ruka from a moving truck and apologizes to her for lying to her thinking that he was a girl from their first meeting, and soon Ruka falls in love with him. Recently Hayate, Linn, Tama discovered a mystery room (in chapter 368) partitioned in the storage room. After Isumi disables the barrier, Hayate discovers that the room holds the same coffin he saw in the Royal Garden 10 years ago. Shortly after that, Yozora shows up and burns the coffin whilst battling Isumi briefly. He later hosts a welcome party for the Violet Mansion tenants. Ruka offers to help pay off his debt along with hers before proclaiming her love for him, though Hayate declares he will continue to be Nagi's butler until she is a happily grown mistress. After the school excursion competition in America, Hayate wins the prize to pay off his debt though chooses otherwise to remain as Nagi's butler. When the anniversary of their first meeting comes, the truth of the relationship is exposed due to Hayate's parents' intervention, leading Hayate to painfully regret and wishes they never met and arrives in a world where Ayumu rescued him instead of Nagi while caught in the King's Jewel's dream world. Ayumu gives Hayate a newfound resolve then went to Nagi and reassures her that the fun things and his desire to protect her were real. After the battle for the Sanzenin inheritance ends, Nagi bravely fires him, which prompts Hayate to find what he wants to do with his new life, after two years he encounters a self-sufficient Nagi in the same place he met her and tells her that even when he's not her butler anymore the desire of protecting her and wanting to be by her side hasn't changed.

Currently there are a total of 12 people in love with Hayate, many of which he has no clue to their true feelings due to his dense nature. They are: Hinagiku, Ayumu, Ruka, Izumi, Isumi, Maria, Nagi, Sakuya, Athena, Konoha, Yomi, and Kotetsu (Homosexual). However, Hayate has only shown interest in Hinagiku, Ayumu, Maria, Athena, Ruka, and Nagi at the very end of the manga.

Shun Ayasaki and Mrs. Ayasaki (Hayate's parents) (綾崎 瞬 と ハヤテの母, Ayasaki Shun to Hayate no haha)
Shun Ayasaki Voiced by: Kenji Hamada
Mrs. Ayasaki Voiced by: Kazusa Murai
Hayate's parents, who appear only in flashbacks as faceless shadows with the characters "Mother" and "Father" scrawled on their faces. Shun has refused to get employed (on the ground that he is undergoing soul-searching and deserves no less than jobs "most suited to him") and his mother has been a compulsive gambler, which led to their bankruptcy. They abandon Hayate after selling him to the Yakuza to ease their financial burdens (a debt of 156,804,000 yen, or approximately US $1.9 million). Later on, Wataru and Hayate find out that Shun was a former member of Wataru's video store which owed Wataru 1,580,000 yen in unpaid late fees. When asked by Sakuya Aizawa if Hayate still has any desire to live with his parents if they had a change of heart and wanted to redeem themselves, Hayate states that no matter what he does, that would never happen; there are no second chances. In chapter 561, Shun suddenly reappears in front of Chiharu and Hayate, who, after a dispute, realizes that his mother disguised as a patient (with a wig like Yukariko's) and has been gathering information from Nagi in order to deceive her, and then tricks Hayate into confessing his romantic love for Nagi is false, leading to a final showdown. Following their failure, they try to flee but are ambushed and attacked by Hisui, with Shun abandoning his wife only to be beaten up by his eldest son Ikusa.

Ikusa Ayasaki (綾崎 イクサ, Ayasaki Ikusa)
Ikusa is the older brother of Hayate. He has a very kind personality which Hayate likes about him. In a flashback, Ikusa is shown giving a friendly farewell and advice to a lady in a shawl that resembles Yukariko Sanzenin's. Hayate lends him a King's Jewel that Santa Claus gave him. Ikusa, in a desperate attitude, to save a person, who turns out to be Athena after she and Hayate had a fight with Ikusa, meeting Athena for the first time. He made a promise to Athena that he will let her see Hayate again. It is shown that he is incredibly strong, with very good athletic capabilities; it is hinted that his strength may be at the same level as Himegami. Ikusa helps all those that need help and wishes to be reunited with his brother Hayate.

Hayate didn't remember that he lent a King's Jewel to Ikusa until in chapter 437, having an encounter with Eight, Hayate finally meets Ikusa (cross-dressing) at a beach who calls himself "lifesaver". He beats up Eight for taking an octopus as of harming sea life, though Shiori reassures him. However, Ikusa doesn't recognize Hayate. As a result, Hayate displays unusual behavior that scares others. It is soon discovered that Ikusa is actually now a rich owner of the 'Asuki Hotel Resort'. But he refuses to hand over the King's Jewel. After going through such methods to earn the pendant, Hayate realized he had lost sight of himself (desperate to regain Nagi's inheritance, and feeling the downfall of Ruka's departure) and reconciles with his brother.

Ikusa reappears in the final chapter where he confronts his hated father Shun, and while promising not to kill him, does not spare him from a severe beating.

Suzune Ayasaki (綾崎 鈴音, Ayasaki Suzune)
Voiced by: Aya Endō
Suzune is a mysterious girl who appears in the movie, Hayate the Combat Butler! Heaven Is a Place on Earth.

It is later revealed that Suzune is actually Hayate's grandmother. Suzune returns to Hayate as a spirit that Hayate sees while on vacation with his friends in Ayumu's countryside. Suzune recreates an amusement park that Hayate once visited as a child with her. Suzune believed that Nagi was causing Hayate to suffer because of her spoiled attitude and that he only stayed with her because of the debt. Suzune gives Hayate a diamond that would pay off the debt so he could live his own life. Despite this Hayate returns the diamond to her and says that he wants to pay off the debt on his own beside Nagi. Suzune then departs to the afterlife with a smile.

Despite Suzune's slightly violent demeanor, she cares greatly for Hayate. She is very disappointed in her son Shun, for loading such a large debt on Hayate's shoulders. She only wishes for Hayate to be happy and goes to great lengths for him to be so.

== Sanzenin household ==
Nagi Sanzenin (三千院 ナギ, Sanzen'in Nagi)
Voiced by: Rie Kugimiya (Japanese), Lily Truncale (English), Charmaine Cordoviz (Filipino)
The main female protagonist Nagi Sanzenin, 13-year-old, biracial, is the only heir to the Sanzenin fortune. She is hot-headed/short-tempered, spoiled, immature, but kind and cute. She has an otaku-level hobby with manga, anime, and video games, and draws her own manga. Nagi has a large crush on Hayate, and she thinks that Hayate loves her since they first met. She sometimes tries to make him take an interest in her in many ways. She gets really jealous when Hayate makes some good statements about other girls. However, Hayate never understands why Nagi is mad at him until finally, Chiharu spoke about Nagi's feelings (in chapter 553) to him.

Nagi's only surviving family is her grandfather, whom she greatly dislikes. She regards Maria as an older sister figure. Nagi's mother, Yukariko, is shown in volume 12 of the manga. She cares for her family and friends, but she doesn't want to show her concern directly, she usually shows her concern with "formal words". Because of her pampered existence, she lacks any worldly knowledge and is even incapable of looking after herself. Nagi is mortally afraid of the dark (due to an incident with Isumi), and so shares her bed with Maria at night. Since going outside is very dangerous because of her status, Nagi favors staying at home, not liking company in general. Hayate managed to convince Nagi that sports is good for her body, and she is able to get into 2nd place on the Hakuō freestyle marathon thanks to Hayate's absorbing training and her huge amount of love for him.

While Hayate always reminded her to gather experiences in the outside world, she always thought that will be boring or she will always get lost and risk being kidnapped. Because of her family's wealth, she became the prime target of criminal organizations. Maria always states to her that without Hayate she will always get lost or in danger. Nagi disliked being a target and spent most of her days indoors playing video games and watching TV and hence slowly becoming a hikikomori. She begins to go to school more often after Hayate transfers to her school. Despite her laziness, Nagi is a highly intelligent student. She skipped grades and is currently in the first year of high school and in the same class as Hayate.

In Shimoda, Nagi decided to take Hayate and Maria on a trip to visit a mysterious meteorite that seems to enhance growth, along with other special powers. Nagi decided to help the alien, Maya, to find its misplaced spaceship. Nagi and Maya find the spaceship at the Saginomiya's place. Nagi accidentally boards on the spaceship, luckily Hayate saves her. When Maya sends Hayate and Nagi home, Hayate encounters Nagi's mother, Yukariko, in a dream and finds out the reason why Nagi comes to Shimoda every year is to remember the anniversary of her mother's death.

On the other hand, in Episode 52, during Golden Week, Nagi, Hayate, and Maria travel to Mykonos Island. Hayate got summoned back to the past when he jumped into the sky to get Nagi's hat back. At that time, Nagi feels uncomfortable going outside, because the Sicilian Mafia is after her. However, Hayate manages to defeat the Mafia but he made a few holes in Nagi's hat. Nagi doesn't mind and said that the holes are proof that Hayate saved her life. After this incident, Nagi falls for Hayate even more because he has vowed to protect her in the past, present, and future. Both Nagis (The one in the present and the one from the past) fall for Hayate deeply. During Hayate's struggle to make a choice whether to destroy the King's Jewel to save Athena, Nagi sensed Hayate's dilemma and decided to destroy the king's jewel out of her own accord so that Hayate could now protect her truly, and not her fortune. She came across Athena on the last day of Golden Week. After coming back from the Golden Week trip, Nagi was forced to leave her mansion due to her forfeiting her inheritance after she destroyed the King's Jewel. Later Nagi, Hayate, and Maria stayed at Yukariko's Violet Mansion and started a new life.

Trying to sell her doujinshi to the public, Nagi went to show her hard work to Ashibashi-sensei but was shocked to realize her hard work was not good enough. Making a bet to sell out her doujinshi at the last Doujinshi convention, Nagi gets help from both Chiharu, Hayate, and Kayura in coming out with ideas to create her own doujinshi compare to Ruka her rival. After the Comisun event, Nagi decides to make a comeback at the Tokyo Big Sight to where the biggest doujinshi competition will be held there. Believing that having supernatural experiences will help create a concept manuscript for a new manga, Nagi takes an itinerary to Kyoto, but later got lost on the empty streets of Hokkaido until she's found late at night by Dr. Kurosu. Nagi determined to win the competition for Hayate's sake when Ruka confronts her feelings for him. As Nagi's manga, "30 Days of Soul Burning", is being sold and read, she soon realizes what she had sincerely desired in her life.

Back home, Nagi is informed by her grandfather, that she can be reinstated as the heir should she brings him a King's Jewel. After a failed attempt to obtain it from Hayate's brother, Nagi orders Hayate to steal the Jewel in possession of Mikado instead. Despite knowing that he was robbed, Mikado accepts it back and agrees to have her become the Sanzenin heir once again. On the next Christmas Eve, Nagi finds out Hayate's true feelings and falls into a great depression; without Maria, her broken spirit unlocks the King's Jewel power awakening in a dreamworld where Hayate loves her for real. After reconciling with Nagi, Hayate made it so she won't suffer the same fate as her mother, rescuing her but staying in the dream world as he couldn't leave, back in the real world a tearful Nagi shouts Hayate's name, and he appears by her side thanks to their strong bond. Nagi gives Hisui the "Loto's Key" and the inheritance, saying she doesn't need it anymore as she is gonna earn her own money, but wishes to eat cake with Hisui sometime, after that she fires Hayate freeing him of his duty to protect her, telling him to live as he wants and love whoever he wants, Hayate accepts and leaves a tearful Nagi. After a time skip of two years, a now self-sufficient Nagi attends a normal middle school, living with Chiharu and Kayura who have failed to pay next year's tuition for Hakuou Academy. On another Christmas night, Nagi's about to get kidnapped in the same place she was rescued by Hayate, but this time she takes care of the situation herself, and observing Hayate surprised at her growth and tells her that even when he's not her butler anymore, his desire of protecting her and wanting to be by her side hasn't changed and that there is "something he needs to tell her," in which a smiling Nagi happily replies that "the night is young", locking hands after that and walking together, implying that this time their feelings are mutual and not a misunderstanding.

Maria (マリア, Maria)
Voiced by: Rie Tanaka (Japanese), Candice Moore (English), Davene Venturanza (Filipino)
Maria is Nagi's maid and is the only person who understands the true relationship between Hayate and Nagi. She appears to be the one in charge of everything in Nagi's manor since everyone from Klaus (head butler) to the SP either obeys or fears her (or both in some cases). She is highly intelligent, somewhat devious, good at general housework, and likes games of all kinds, though she is deathly afraid of cockroaches, which she refers to as "the dark life-form that exists in the kitchen and other places". She has also proved capable of self-defense techniques in times of need. She is, however, poor at disguises, as seen multiple times when she tries to spy on Hayate and Nagi and is recognized instantly. Maria is actually the one who saved Hayate on Christmas Eve after inspiring him that kidnapping is wrong and there are still good people in the world.

She was found in front of St. Mary's Church by Mikado as an orphan, where she got her first name. Not knowing anything about herself, her birthday was decided as December 24, the day she was found. She is the unfortunate one who always has to clean up everyone's messes. She has seen Hayate naked multiple times (and has been seen naked by him once), and she sees the effect he has on other girls, many of whom are attracted to him for his kind nature. Her own feelings for Hayate are very clear, and she blushes whenever Hayate saves her from danger. Also, when Hayate accidentally tripped on her, they both blush as well. Although she has chosen to put any feelings for Hayate aside in order to support Nagi's love for him, she has been shown to be curious about love. However, there are countless cases that Maria is unable to control her own feelings for Hayate.

Maria is also legendary throughout Hakuō Academy for having graduated high school at the age of 13 in just three years while maintaining the position of Student Council President for all three years. Because of this, she was able to recommend Hayate to Hakuō Academy despite him narrowly failing the entrance exams. Due to such unusual experiences, she both appears and acts in a manner more mature than people typical of her age. Because of this, even people near to her speak of her as if she is older than she really is, a pet peeve for her. She commonly responds that she is still a fresh 17-year-old girl and remains 17 years old (according to this phrase) throughout the entire six-month-span of the series. She may have met Athena as a child. After the Golden Week vacation, she was happy about Nagi wanting to have a normal life after Hayate found the Violet Mansion through Klaus. Afterward, she and Hayate decorated and cleaned it to make it suitable to be lived in. When Hayate attempted to seduce Maria, a requirement to enter the Royal Garden, she confesses her decision to resign. After discussing Nagi's misunderstanding with Hayate and time skip through her fourteenth birthday, Maria leaves a letter behind. Inside contains a photo of the trio together.

Kenjiro Hata envisioned that Maria's last name is Ayasaki, indicating she is Shun's daughter from a different mother then was unknowingly abandoned; making her Hayate's older half-sister.

Mikado Sanzenin (三千院 帝, Sanzen'in Mikado)
Voiced by: Tomomichi Nishimura
Mikado Sanzenin is Nagi's grandfather and the head of the Sanzenin family, as well as one of the five directors in charge of Hakuō Academy. He lives in a mansion much bigger than Nagi's mansion with many servants. It is unknown where the Sanzenin fortune comes from but Nagi calls her grandfather an oil tycoon. He has the ability to judge a person's character just by looking at them. From what he saw in Hayate, he gives Hayate a pendant that is supposed to be his compass for life (but turns out to be a cursed pendant).

Even though Mikado is Nagi's only direct relative, they do not get along. This is evidenced when Nagi continuously hits him when Mikado says something that she dislikes. (Episode 11) Nagi dreads going to the main house to visit him. As a result, Mikado is not seen many times after his first appearance, although he makes a brief appearance in volume 12 when Nagi states that although she knows that no matter how much money she has, she cannot bring back her mother; there may still be some people in this world that do not understand this. However, it is obvious that he worries for her, which is shown when he tries to stop the assassination/kidnapping attempts and pushes them onto Hayate when he announces that he will pass the Sanzenin inheritance to the person who makes Nagi cry and beg for forgiveness and which later changed – with the suggestion from Hayate and a little help from Maria – to get rid of the butler first. This further changed in volume 21 of the manga, that the inheritance will be granted to the one who manages to steal or destroy the King's Jewel Mikado gave to Hayate. In episode 51 of the first anime, he hatched a plan to fire Hayate, although it failed to materialize. After Nagi lost the inheritance when she destroyed the King's Jewel for Hayate's sake and Athena, Mikado reveals the best way to have Nagi as his successor again is obtain another King's Jewel. Mikado later reveals that the true inheritor of the Sanzenin will be the one who writes their name in his will, which is contained in a case that can be only opened by a special key, known as the "Loto's Key", which is later revealed to be hidden in the Royal Garden. Mikado personally tasks in foiling Hisui and Himegami's plot to access the Royal Garden.

He is shown to be not very fond of Hayate, mainly because Hayate's dream has nothing to do with gaining big money, or marrying Nagi. He is aware of Nagi's crush on Hayate. It appears that he was the Santa Claus whom Hayate met ten years ago in chapter 249. "Mikado" means emperor, showing his position in the Sanzenin family.

Yukariko Sanzenin (三千院 紫子, Sanzen'in Yukariko)
Voiced by: Yūko Minaguchi
Yukariko is Nagi's deceased mother. She was Mikado Sanzenin's daughter and was friends with Mikoto Tachibana and Hatsuho Saginomiya. According to Hatsuho, Yukariko's appearance resembles Hayate's. Yukariko appears in Nagi's dream and Hayate's illusion (in 2nd Season). It is also seen in chapter 187, that Yukariko was helped by Hayate Ayasaki's brother, Ikusa Ayasaki. The reason why he helped her is still unknown but the person was definitely Yukariko as her scarf is seen. It is implied that was how she entered the Royal Garden and gained the "Power of Royalty" since she was the "chosen one by God". She often said to Nagi that she would always look after her as the sky and the stars. She died of sickness when Nagi was about 5 years old. According to her character profile, she didn't die because of sickness. Her grave is in Shimoda, and Nagi visits it every year.

Shin Hayek (新 ハイエク, Shin Haieku)
Voiced by: Tomokazu Sugita
Shin is Yukariko's late husband and Nagi's father. He was adopted into the Sanzenin family after marrying Yukariko. Nagi was about too young to remember him. He is also Mikado's son-in-law; he has a similar hairstyle to Hayate's. After losing his parents at a young age and growing up in a very poor environment, Shin always dreamed of becoming something big. Spending his adolescent days stealing from others, Shin grew into a well-known American thief until he met Yukariko. He proposed and they ended up getting married and spent their honeymoon in Shimoda.

In the 3rd season, Shin had served Yukariko as her butler while planning his escape with the Kurotsubaki (Black Camellia), a clock that brings bad luck but can grant the owner a life full of miracles. However, he eventually fell in love with Yukariko and instead wished to be the man worthy of her. He died in a car accident in Las Vegas. Mikado reveals that Shin was a con artist who married Yukariko aiming for the Sanzenin fortune, or so he thought. In episode 11, reveals the Black Camellia is a magical sword that exchanges a person's soul, Shin was really inside the Black Camellia for 13 years until Hayate got stabbed, they switch souls, and Nagi finally meets her father (in Hayate's body). Shin wanted back the ring stolen by his former employer Dolly that signifies his and Yukariko's eternal love. At the end of the series, Shin reunites with Yukariko in the afterlife.

Seishirou Klaus (倉臼 征史郎, Kurausu Seishirō)
Voiced by: Kenta Miyake (Japanese), Mike Brooks (English), Robert Brillantes (Filipino)
Klaus is the 58-year-old head butler of the Sanzenin family, who is usually away on business. He was Yukariko's butler when she was young. He is jealous of Hayate because he does a better job than he does. He had made several plans to fire Hayate, but they all failed, a similarity to Mikado's failing idiotic plans. He saw Hayate crossdress as a catgirl without knowing that Hayate was forced to by Nagi and Maria. He is self-centered, has a low alcohol tolerance, doesn't do well with tobacco or women, and likes cars and bikes. Klaus once had a dog named Lucky that used to live in the Sanzenin garden, Lucky appears in chapter 183, chewing Izumi's doll before attempting to attack her, Hayate saves her by hitting him with a large stick. Klaus always gets beat-up by Nagi when he tries to fire or discourage Hayate. In the later series, Klaus swaps places with Hayate to serve the tenants at the Violet Mansion. He is currently in love with Hayate's female character, Hermione Ayasaki.

Akane Himegami (姫神 茜, Himegami Akane)
Voiced by: Mitsuo Iwata
Akane was Nagi's former butler. A torn corner of a picture recently discovered (chapter 369) shows Himegami as a child. Judging from the way Nagi and Maria speak of him, he quit due to a problem related to Nagi's personality traits. Neither Nagi nor Maria seem to want to elaborate on his departure. Also with references from the first volume he was close to Nagi. He wrote a book on how a butler can acquire a one-hit kill technique, but later Nagi burnt the book. He is probably around Hayate and Maria's age. In episode 34 of the anime, he makes his appearance, but with his face obscured by the shadows. He returns once more in episode 38 wearing a mask. In episode 39 his face is shown. In chapter 225, Sonia Shaflnarz mentions that were rumors indicating that Akane might have been fired for trying to steal the treasure of the Sanzenin family that is associated with the King's Jewels. In the anime, he also insists that he be called "Princess God" rather than Himegami, which is a direct translation of his surname. He finally appears in the manga, under another name Aoi Himegami (姫神 葵, Himegami Aoi), during Hayate's fight with Hisui for the King's Jewels. On the occasion, Hisui claims that he is currently working as her butler. Is the revealed Himegami acquires the Royal Garden due to his unrequited feelings for Yukariko until Mikoto tells him the truth about Yukariko.

Himegami originally made a brief appearance on the bottom panel at the end of chapter 146 but was later taken out and replaced with the panel of Hayate and Nagi holding hands.

Tama (タマ)
Voiced by: Jūrōta Kosugi (Season 1 - 3) Yuri Chinen (Season 4)
Tama is a white tiger from Africa, who was rescued by Nagi as a cub, and was raised on Matsuzaka beef and expensive tuna fish, making him incapable of going to the zoo or back to the wild. He can speak the human language, though he does not reveal this to Maria or Nagi because he doesn't want to shatter the girls' dreams. He will lay his life down to protect Nagi, as Nagi saved his life and raised him herself.

Despite the fact he is a white tiger, he was found by Nagi while she was exploring Africa. The manga artist admitted that he made a mistake when fans wrote to him pointing out there are no tigers in Africa. Because of this, when Nagi first finds Tama, she becomes convinced that he is just a cat. Usually, when Tama is speaking or involved in a comical situation, he looks rather cartoon-like and, when standing on his hind legs, is about human size. He appears this way in most of his appearances, although he will occasionally be drawn in his actual size and appearance. He has been known to imitate other people's voices and has done a perfect imitation of Nagi once.

Tama is often seen as relaxing or doing human-like activities. However, he seems to enjoy reading male model magazines in his free time, which only goes to show Tama's odd behavior. He once fell in love with a tiger on a picture of a magazine advertisement for Brazil and tried to machinate a plan involving Klaus' retirement just to get to go see her, before being reminded by Hayate that there are no tigers in Brazil. After Nagi had moved to the Violet Mansion she requested that Hayate bring Tama into the new house. Later, Isumi has given him the collar of Nibelungs.

Shiranui (シラヌイ(白野威、【しらぬい】))
Voiced by: Kana Asumi
The "White Kitten" Hayate receives from Hinagiku. He is black with a small white X-shaped scar on his forehead. He has a very devilish personality and deliberately gets Tama into trouble. A teary-eyed Hinagiku had to say goodbye to Shiranui because her mom had a cat allergy. Hayate then decided to take Shiranui and find him a new owner. When Hayate returned to the Sanzenin Mansion, he was immediately welcomed back by Nagi who caught sight of the cat. At first, Nagi was doubtful as to taking care of the cat but quickly changed her mind and decided to make the cat a member of the Sanzenin family and named the cat Shiranui. His name is a reference from the videogame Okami, whose protagonist is also known as Shiranui. Kenjiro Hata apparently was playing this game prior to naming Shiranui.

Shiori Makimura (牧村 志織, Makimura Shiori)
Voiced by: Rina Satō (Japanese), Catherine Fu (English)
Shiori Makimura is a genius scientist with the Mikado Hyper Energy (M.H.E) Electronics Corporation as the Chief of Development, Humanoid Nursing, and Battlefield Weapons Department, and Advanced Technology Development Division for the Sanzen'in. Her specialties is on computers and mechas. Her development team created Nursing Robot Eight and other mechas seen in the series. She is in fact so talented, that she had even built a mecha when she was half asleep. During her high school years, she was the vice president of the student council in Hakuou. The president at that time was Maria. She enjoyed calling Maria nicknames like "Little President"; takes growth videos of her, similar to what the Hakuou Three Amiga does to Hinagiku. In volume 3, robot Eight asks her to be his girlfriend and she accepts, but later breaks up. In episode 23, Shiori is sent to teach her old school, Hakuō Academy, because her superiors believe she does not have enough heart. Another weakness Shiori has is that she is often quite forgetful, completely forgetting about building Eight and overlooking the installation of a critical control chip in one of her mechas, which lead to disastrous results.

Yomi Kyoubashi (京橋 ヨミ, Kyōbashi Yomi)
Yomi is the daughter of the Sanzenin gardener. She is friendly with Hayate and often helps him in her free time. On hearing Hayate praise her, Nagi grows jealous of the "younger hard-working gardener girl".

Sanzenin SP (三千院SP, Sanzen'in Esupī)
SP leader Voiced by: Takafumi Kawakami
The secret police with a force of over 2000, are hired by the Sanzenins to ensure the safety of the mansion's occupants (especially Nagi). They can be easily distracted from their duties sometimes, for example, once they were distracted by a concert while searching for Nagi at Hakuō Academy. Although they will obey Nagi's orders, her authority can be overridden by Maria (who will intervene when Nagi's demands become unrealistic), who can be considered the head of security for the mansion (in addition to being a maid).

== Aizawa household ==
Sakuya Aizawa (愛沢 咲夜, Aizawa Sakuya)
Voiced by: Kana Ueda
Sakuya Aizawa is Nagi's cousin and from Kansai. Like Nagi, Sakuya is very rich and has a similar personality — loud, arrogant, abusive of servants, and unwilling to accept defeat in anything; Nagi is one of the few people who can stand up to her wrath, Sakuya is the one who has known Nagi the longest. Sakuya is the eldest daughter in her family with three younger sisters (Hinata, Yuuka, and Shiori) and one younger brother (Asato). Sakuya is obsessed with stand-up comedy, especially Manzai style. She encourages Hayate to become a comedian because she believes that Hayate's life up to now is nothing more than a comedy. She is quite well-endowed for her age, easily surpassing Nagi, Hinagiku, and Isumi, and a match for the normally developed teenagers like Ayumu or Chiharu; so far only Athena and Maria are the ones amongst the "minors" of the cast to clearly surpass her.

Sakuya can often be seen hanging around with Isumi: she is usually present when Isumi performs an exorcism, although she doesn't have any special powers. When Isumi disappears after seen in Greece with Nagi, Sakuya flies to Greece to look for her. She's not all bad though, since deep down she does care for her cousin. Sakuya is one of few people besides Isumi and Hayate who are involved with the Tennousu family and Royal Garden.

Sakuya develops a crush on Hayate in Episode 32 when he saved her from the demon monsters, evidenced by blushing. Her crush on Hayate is further evidenced in Episode 40. However, Hayate doesn't understand Sakuya's feelings for him. In the 5th episode of Season 2, Sakuya falls deeper for Hayate when he tidies up her clothing. However, she can't quite express her emotions and thinks that Hayate is making fun of her instead. On the 19th episode of Season 2, she expresses her love for Hayate indirectly winking her eye after Hayate made her laugh on the 29th of March. On the 24th episode of Season 2, she expresses her love for Hayate again in another indirect way. He asks Hayate whether or not she can call him "Brother Hayate" instead of "Bankrupt Butler". She did this because her feelings for Hayate has grown.

On the other hand, Sakuya also develops a crush on Wataru in Episode 51. Her heart was touched when Wataru thanked her for giving him a spot in Hakuou. She also stuck herself close to Wataru on the 23rd episode of Season 2 when she thinks he did a good job on the gag show for the audience, as a sign of love for him. However, Wataru doesn't want her to stick that close and pushed her away. Wataru then fell on top of Sakuya, making the both of them blush. Their feelings for each other have increased after that.

She rarely appears again, but during the Golden Week vacation, she, with Wataru and Saki, went to America. As Mikoto's bet against Wataru, Sakuya was dressed as a bunny girl and was subjected to strip if Saki lost in her gambling match against Mikoto. After battling with Wataru and his mother, she asks for Mikado's private jet to find Isumi in Mykonos Island, because she was lost. Then they appeared when Hayate was attacked by King Midas for the first time, she helped much in the final battle, and bring back everyone to Japan. Sakuya and Isumi are worried about Nagi's inheritance. But Isumi said that Nagi does not get help from her and Sakuya. Then Sakuya came to the Violet Mansion to see Nagi then she met Chiharu there and keep her secret as a maid. She wants to understand Nagi's manga, but she can't. Then she helped Wataru for lending some money for his new businesses.

Gilbert Kent (ギルバート・ケント, Girubāto Kento)
Voiced by: Tōru Nara
Gilbert Kent is Sakuya's illegitimate half-brother. He does not look Japanese because of his brown curly hair and dark complexion, but Sakuya thinks they look "alike". After Nagi's grandfather announced a condition to inherit the Sanzenin fortune, Gilbert quickly begins to pursue the fortune, even begging for it. However, Hayate easily stops him from hurting Nagi and getting the inheritance. He later receives a mecha from Shiori Makimura, whom he refers to as a mad scientist, to help him in his pursuit.

Gilbert again tried to gain the inheritance during Hayate and the other's trip to Mykonos. He confronted Hayate and Nagi but was immediately beaten up and ignored. He finally asked for a handicap to make his chances better. His condition for the fight was to play a 2v2 beach volleyball game, and if he won the King's Jewel will be destroyed. Choosing Hinagiku as Hayate's partner. Everything was going well for him because at that time Hinagiku intentionally held back in playing since she wanted to act weak in front of Hayate. However, he made a mistake when he insulted her flat chest. The insults were enough to make Hinagiku serious, and with 1 hit of the volleyball destroyed Gilbert's partner. And with the final play of the game, Gilbert and his last robot was defeated.

Mr. Aizawa (咲夜の父, Sakuya no chichi; Sakuya's father)
Voiced by: Katsuyuki Konishi
Mr. Aizawa is Sakuya's father. A man with a strange sense of humor, he is apparently proud of his "naked conversation skills", much to his children's horror. Despite this, he gets along very well with his younger children.

Makita & Kunieda (巻田と国枝, Makita to Kunieda)
Makita Voiced by: Tōru Nara
Kunieda Voiced by: Jun Ōsuga
Makita and Kunieda are Sakuya's personal butlers. They don't appear unless they're told to do a task. Both butlers wear glasses and dark navy suits. Makita and Kunieda are very skillful, as they can complete tasks instantly and perfectly, even amazing Hayate with their skills. In the anime, it is revealed that Makita plays the guitar and Kunieda likes to read books. Makita is 35 years old. Kunieda is 34 years old.

== Saginomiya household ==
Isumi Saginomiya (鷺ノ宮 伊澄, Saginomiya Isumi)
Voiced by: Miyu Matsuki, (Japanese), Catherine Fu (English)
Isumi Saginomiya is a girl who always wears a kimono and, sometimes, a stole. She is Nagi's best friend; they met at a party a long time ago. When all the other children, Sakuya included, laughed at Nagi's first attempt at writing her own manga, Isumi took interest in it and asked Nagi how it ends. Nagi then asked Isumi (in a childish sense) to marry her. As a result, Nagi has always asked Isumi for ideas for her own manga, but it proved that Isumi's ideas were even more awful than that of Nagi's.

Like Nagi, Isumi is very rich; however, Isumi is soft-spoken, kind, and a good cook. While she does not have an awful sense of direction, she constantly gets lost because she is apt to forget her destination and believes herself to be reliable and independent (a belief further enforced by the flighty nature of her mother and grandmother); the fact that she can disappear from people's eyes instantaneously only complicates the matter, without a guide, map and compass prepared 2 hours in advance she will get lost and then says the other people got lost. She also has a habit of saying, when she doesn't understand how to use a machine such as a cellular phone or a vending machine, that the machine is broken. She displays a high level of empathy for Nagi's feelings, yet she does not recognize Wataru's love for her, a fact that Nagi, Maria, and Hayate comment on. She has, however, seemed to have developed a crush on Hayate.

Although what Isumi actually did on Episode 24 was to de-curse Hayate's pendant, she did confess to Hayate afterward. Hayate, as always, misunderstands it as something else. In volume 5 of the manga, it is revealed that she can perform exorcisms. Humorously, she calls this power "hand soap", though Hayate assumes she means "hand power". She loves Hayate and does not wish to see him sad.

Isumi is the inheritor of the secret mystical power called Jutsushiki Hachiyo, the spell of the eight leaves. This power is only inherited by a chosen female child in the Saginomiya family. In volume 11, she loses this power, which causes some slight distress to Hayate as he would have to literally bleed through grueling trouble in order for her to regain it, but she rejects his help, saying that she does not wish to cause other people to harm for her own ends. However, in volume 12, when Hayate is on the verge of tears thinking of a way to save Nagi from being blasted off into outer space, she kisses Hayate on the cheek (while he is bleeding profusely after being struck on the head by Ginka) and regains her power, sending Hayate speeding towards the UFO to save Nagi.

Later in the story, Isumi has a prominent role regarding the events about Athena and Hayate's past, by aiding Hayate in several ways during the fight against King Midas. It is also revealed that her hair temporarily pales whenever she overuses her power. Afterward, she acts alone to destroy the remaining King's Jewel to prevent further risk of anyone from reaching the Royal Garden. Isumi thwarts Hisui and retrieves Nagi to escape the illusionary world as the Royal Garden collapse with Hayate staying behind, although he returns as well.

Hatsuho Saginomiya (鷺ノ宮 初穂, Saginomiya Hatsuho)
Voiced by: Akiko Hiramatsu
Hatsuho is Isumi's mother. She is 31 years old. She forgets things extremely quickly, much to Isumi's chagrin. Like her daughter, she knows a lot about the spiritual realm and supernatural things. However, she is hopeless when it comes to technological gadgets. She also has connections in the past with Yukariko. According to her, Hayate looks like Nagi's mother, Yukariko.

Konoe Saginomiya (鷺ノ宮 九重, Saginomiya Konoe)
Voiced by: Mariko Mukai
Konoe is Isumi's grandmother. She is 64 years old.

Ginka Saginomiya (鷺ノ宮 銀華, Saginomiya Ginka)
Voiced by: Tomoko Kaneda
Ginka is Isumi's great-grandmother. She is 91 years old. She demonstrates a high capacity for fighting, as shown in volume 11 when she tries to defeat Hayate. However, this was all done because she was worried about her great-granddaughter, for whom she cares very much for. Ginka normally looks like a young child, but this is only because she is able to stay healthy and alive by sucking on the blood of people who are close to death (driven to their critical limit). She promptly assists in major situations regarding the Royal Garden.

Isumi's butlers (伊澄の執事たち)
Voiced by: Tomoyuki Shimura
Voiced by: Satoshi Hino
Voiced by: Go Shinomiya
An army of butlers as skilled swordsman serves the Saginomiya family. Hayate mistook them as assassins upon his first meeting with Isumi. They are overprotective of Isumi’s safety due to her zero sense of direction.

== Tachibana household ==
Wataru Tachibana (橘 ワタル, Tachibana Wataru)
Voiced by: Marina Inoue (Japanese), Lily Truncale (English), Ely Martin/Jefferson Utanes/AJ Constantino (Filipino)
Wataru Tachibana is Nagi's fiancé, but they have no feelings for each other. Wataru claims that his parents arranged their future marriage entirely for money. He lives and runs a video-rental store in the city, the last store owned by the Tachibana group, which lost all their assets and is on the verge of bankruptcy due to the recession. His dream is to make his store great and acquire a fortune greater than Nagi's. Wataru was in love with Isumi. He initially hates Hayate for accidentally stealing Isumi's affection, but later he looks up to him and strives to be like him. Despite this, he still calls Hayate by his own personal nickname for him, "Butler In Debt" or "Bankrupt Butler" (or a variation thereof), and doesn't hide his usual irritation. He's the same age as Nagi, Isumi & Sakuya.

Later on in the manga, it is revealed in an off-hand conversation that Wataru's store is actually starting to do well and is making some profit. However, he has yet to retain a fortune that can match Nagi's. On Golden Week, Wataru took Saki on a trip to Las Vegas. They had a gamble with Mikoto to reach a decision since she started looking down on Wataru and his dad for their lack of business insight. Sakuya also ended up being part of the bet since they did not have enough money. Sakuya was dressed as a bunny girl and forced to strip if Saki lost in the gamble. They ended up winning by asking Hayate if he would choose red or black and choosing the opposite in the roulette. Wataru later receives a pendant (King's Jewel), from his mother, which is similar to Hayate's and Aika's. It is also shown that he cares for Saki, although in a different way from how he feels about Isumi. This is implied through the great means he often goes through to make her happy or to otherwise make up for wronging her. This includes a time when he believes she is downtrodden because he had forgotten her 20th birthday when he had also promised to buy her a furisode (a long-sleeved kimono used for coming-of-age ceremonies). In order to make up for this, he goes as far as to buy a 200,000 yen (roughly $1,650) yukata for her because the furisode was too expensive, and even rejects a chance (as he sees it) to win Isumi's heart. Later on, he realizes his love for Saki when he saw her face in his mind just before confessing to Isumi in chapter 330. After they deposit the money received from Sakuya to a bank, Wataru decided to quit Hakuou to manage his businesses. Then starts anew so his video shop "Doujinshi. Game. Comic. V. Tachibana" will profitable enough.

Enkyou Tachibana (橘 円京, Tachibana Enkyō)
Voiced by: Tomoyuki Shimura
Enkyō is the head of the Tachibana family. He was the one who arranged Wataru and Nagi's engagement and rescued Saki and her grandmother. He is currently overseas with Rei fighting crime.

Mikoto Tachibana (橘 美琴, Tachibana Mikoto)
Enkyō's daughter and Wataru's mother. She lives in Las Vegas with Jirousaburou, and has amazing business insight, claiming to be able to net 1 billion yen in 2 years from the land appreciation of Wataru's store. She considers both Wataru and her husband to have very poor vision in what relates to business. According to Nagi, she went senseless after her dearest friend Yukariko died, thus relying on gambling for a living. Mikoto meets Hayate in chapter 519. After a small nag because of his resemblance to Shin Hayek, she gives him two King's Jewels gathered by Ruri Tsugumi due to Hayate's mysterious connection with Yukariko.

Jirousaburou Ichijou (一条 次郎三郎, Ichijō Jirōsaburō)
Jirousaburou is the combat butler of the Tachibana family. He worked as the host during the gambling match between Saki and Mikoto being held to determine whether Wataru would stay in the United States. Jirousaburou has confirmed a lolicon as he placed Sakuya in a bunny suit that rips the more Wataru loses the match, which was heading into a negative and embarrassing outcome for her.

== Kijima household ==
Saki Kijima (貴嶋 サキ, Kijima Saki)
Voiced by: Saki Nakajima
Saki Kijima is Wataru's maid. She is 20 years old. She is significantly older than Wataru and lives with him in his video-rental store. Her biggest fear is that Wataru will start watching a child movie when he reaches 90, to which he agrees with. She takes on a mixture of a servant and elder sister role to Wataru, often changing from being subservient to scolding him, depending on the situation. She also reacts strongly whenever Hayate touches her anywhere, such as tapping her on the shoulder or carrying her away from danger, worrying about whether or not their physical contact will affect her chances of getting a husband later in life. This is not only limited to Hayate but other men as well.

Saki came in contact with the Tachibana family when Wataru's grandfather, Enkyō Tachibana, saved her and her grandmother, the legendary maid Rei Kijima, while they were traveling around the world searching for her missing parents (who, in fact, are not lost at all and live in Ueno).

Saki develops a crush on Wataru in Episode 25 by stating that Wataru has grown into an old guy. Further evidence proving this is on Episode 29 when Wataru holds her hand, both blushing.

Rei Kijima (貴嶋 レイ, Kijima Rei)
Rei Kijima is Saki's grandmother and the legendary maid. She set off on a journey with Saki to find her missing daughter and son-in-law. While on the journey, she protected presidents from assassination, solved unsolved mysteries that would have been filed away forever, and liberated oppressed citizens by serving cuisine to emperors. When she was 62 years old, she was about to die in the middle of the Sahara Desert when Enkyō Tachibana saved her with his strong words. In order to repay the debt, she travels with Enkyō fighting crime.

== Katsura household ==
Hinagiku Katsura (桂 ヒナギク, Katsura Hinagiku)
Voiced by: Shizuka Itō (Japanese), Catherine Fu (English)
The second female protagonist Hinagiku Katsura is the current Student Council President and kendo club president at Hakuō Academy. She is 15 (currently 16) and is an expert with swords, specifically kendo. Her family is also quite wealthy like most of the other girls at Hakuou. She can also speak as many as 17 languages. She first meets Hayate when he is lost on the huge Hakuō campus and ends up rescuing her. She had been helping a baby bird who had fallen out of its nest, but due to her fear of heights, had become stuck without her realizing it. Hayate ends up helping her down the tree and then promises that he will help her should she ever call for him. In gratitude, she invites him to the top of the school's clock tower, where only student council elites are allowed. She allows Hayate to call her by her first name and also seems to be infatuated by Hayate and his attractive personality.

However, in volumes 9 and 10, it is revealed that Hinagiku suffers from a past nearly identical to that of Hayate's – she, along with her sister, had also been abandoned by their biological parents, who left them with a debt of 80 million yen (approximately 1 million US dollars) shortly before Hinagiku's sixth birthday. Following this, her sister, Yukiji, managed to pay off the debt (albeit through what the manga depicts as rather a dubious means) and the two of them went to live with the Katsura family, as Mr. Katsura had been Yukiji's elementary school teacher. The hair clip Hinagiku is always seen wearing was a birthday present from her real parents. When Hinagiku finally sees the beautiful view from atop the clocktower on the night of her 16th birthday with Hayate's help, though, she finally realizes that she actually loves him. She had been afraid of admitting this to herself because she was scared that she would forget about her past if she fell in love with him. Later on in the series, after many interruptions, Hinagiku manages to confess her love for Hayate to Ayumu in order for her to help clear her conscience. Upon hearing the news, Ayumu cheers up Hinagiku, leaving her confused. She explains that although her feelings may not be returned, she is content to be with Hayate nonetheless and encourages Hinagiku to try her best, provoking a competition between the two friends.

Hinagiku is sometimes referred to as being rather masculine for a girl by other characters in the series. This is exemplified on Valentine's Day in volume 7, where Hinagiku is given a lot of chocolates by female admirers. Miki suggests this is because Hinagiku is seen as being "cooler" than the boys, and the fact that she was rather domineering at a younger age. This is similar to how Hayate is seen as being rather feminine.

When Hinagiku tries to confess her love to Hayate, he surprises her with his feelings, telling her that the one he loves is none other than Athena and that he needs to confess his feelings to Athena. Hinagiku advises Hayate to pursue his feelings and not be hesitant. She met Athena prior to meeting Hayate a year before. When she goes back to the mansion she's staying at, Hinagiku breaks down in tears, whilst trying to accept the fact that Hayate loves someone else. In later chapters, we see that Hinagiku has decided to help Hayate and the others when King Midas made his move and attacked the hotel where the others were staying. She goes to Athena's mansion to help Hayate defeat King Midas and rescue Athena. Once Hayate and Athena are reunited (while displaying great signs of affection for each other), Hinagiku leaves in tears trying to give them some privacy. The next day, after the Athena conflict is resolved, she learns from him that Athena turned him down, but Hayate escapes before she is given a chance to pursue the topic. In chapter 300 and 301, Athena (Alice) while in her child form calls Hinagiku her "Mama" and Hayate her "Papa" causing the two to be greatly embarrassed as those present make jokes about the misunderstanding. She eventually goes to live with Hayate in the Violet Mansion after Athena threatens to tell Hayate about Hinagiku's feelings for him. Listening to Hayate's refusal of dating girls, Hinagiku decides to help him by getting close to him. Hinagiku suppresses her fear of heights for the sake of saving Hayate against Himegami. She confesses her feelings to Hayate in the final chapter of the manga, but his answer is not shown.

Hinagiku is the most popular character in Hayate no Gotoku. She has won numerous anime/manga popularity contests on the internet, the most significant of which is by winning first place in the 2009 International Saimoe League (the most prestigious and the most popular female-moe anime online poll).

Yukiji Katsura (桂 雪路, Katsura Yukiji)
Voiced by: Hitomi Nabatame (Japanese), Lily Truncale (English)
Yukiji is the 28-year-old sister of Hinagiku. She is a world history teacher at Hakuō Academy and doubles as a 24-hour gate guard. She refuses to let Hayate enter the school when they first meet because she is afraid that letting unauthorized personnel on campus will result in a salary deduction for her. Her attitude softens after Hayate first saves her from falling off the clock tower, but she still almost causes Hayate to be rejected from Hakuō by unnecessarily making him anxious during his entrance exam. She repays Hayate by telling everyone in her class on Hayate's first day that he is a super cool person. She has a group of underachieving students (Izumi, Miki, and Risa) who hang out with her a lot. She lives on the Hakuō campus; she tells Hayate that she does this so that she can save rent money and use that money to buy alcohol instead. It is a recurring gag that she will do anything for money, going as far as to allow an evil spirit to possess her because it told her it would give her a million yen. When Shiori Makimura is sent to teach at Hakuō, Yukiji is demoted to a sub-homeroom teacher. She later regains her position as homeroom teacher when Makimura is promoted to a higher position. It is implied that Yukiji was once Ayumu's tutor who taught her how to play the guitar and later gave Ayumu her guitar.

In the extras of volume four of the manga, the author writes that before starting the Hayate no Gotoku! manga, he had created a one-shot manga where the story is about a female high-school student and her little sister trying to pay back an 80 million Yen debt, then writes that these characters are, in fact, Yukiji and Hinagiku.

Mrs. Katsura (雪路とヒナギクの養母, Hinagiku to Yukiji no yōbo; Yukiji & Hinagiku's adoptive mother)
Voiced by: Emi Shinohara
The adoptive mother of Yukiji and Hinagiku, she seems to have a fondness for Hinagiku. She is also attracted to Hayate due to his feminine looks, and tends to always want to make him wear Hinagiku's unwanted clothes, much to her embarrassment.

Mr. Katsura (雪路とヒナギクの養父, Yukiji to Hinagiku no yōfu; Yukiji & Hinagiku's adoptive father)
Voiced by: Masami Kikuchi
He is the former grade teacher of Yukiji who took her and Hinagiku into his household as their adoptive father when they paid off their debts. He is said to have a fondness for Yukiji.

== Nishizawa household ==
Ayumu Nishizawa (西沢 歩, Nishizawa Ayumu)
Voiced by: Mikako Takahashi (Japanese), Muriel Hoffman (English)
Ayumu Nishizawa is a girl from Hayate's previous school before he became a butler and is usually seen with Hinagiku. She is currently 16 years old. She always had feelings for Hayate and is happy when he pays his old school a visit. It is revealed in Episode 10 of Season 2 that she fell in love with Hayate because he saved her from a bicycle crash. She violently lashes out at anyone who badmouths her and Hayate, including a teacher who called Hayate a dropout because his parents had refunded all his school fees the day Hayate was sold. She confesses her feelings to Hayate, but Hayate rejects them after getting a vision of Nagi. Undeterred, she tries to talk to Hayate when she sees him a week later, but she runs into Nagi. She is shocked that, in terms of metaphoric strength, Nagi is a dragon while she is a hamster. Nishizawa retreats, vowing next time to bring a stronger hamster. She later challenges Nagi to karaoke, only to lose. In the anime, it is a running gag that she appears in every episode, usually for less than 30 seconds, doing something entirely unrelated to the episode's plot, though always related to food. However, she has successfully confessed her love towards Hayate, which often places her in situations where she is alone with him. Ayumu is friends with Wataru, from whom she often rents videos, and tested her chocolate on him before giving it to Hayate on Valentine's Day. Another weird habit about her is that every time she buys a drink at the vending machine that responds with "Thank you very much", she would always say, "You are welcome". Currently, Ayumu also works part-time at Wataru's new video shop.

On May 15th, she believes Hayate has forgotten her birthday but in actual fact, he and Nagi were planning a surprise party at the cafe the 3 worked at. She tries to get him to realize it is her birthday and him trying to keep the fact that he knows a secret. Ayumu loses and leaves straight after her shift, Nagi convinces her to come back and she is greeted by Nagi, Hayate, Hinagiku, and everyone else. While visiting the Violet Mansion, much to her dismay she learns that Ruka has become a newest tenant. After seeing that Hinagiku is happy with her moving in and still seeing Ruka as a threat, Ayumu decides to rent out the last room in the Violet Mansion. When Christmas Eve comes again, Ayumu thought about Hayate and Athena, wondering she if could've made a difference.

Kazuki Nishizawa (西沢 一樹, Nishizawa Kazuki)
Voiced by: Eri Nakao
Kazuki Nishizawa is the younger brother of Ayumu and a friend of Wataru. Like Hayate, he has a feminine appearance. A year ago, Kazuki met Nagi crying in front of a cherry blossom tree and fell in love with her at first sight. He is also the same age as Nagi. When he met her again in Wataru's store, he invited her to a walk and finally confessed his love to her. During their "date" she told him that she already loves someone else; and after he saw Hayate saving Nagi from falling in a lake, Kazuki realized it was Hayate she loves. But the date did not end on a low note because Nagi had finally come to remember her first meeting with Kazuki. He buys a manga that Nagi was handing out at a doujinshi convention (in chapter 293), technically Kazuki volunteers to help increase Wataru's marketing.

Yasuhiro Nishizawa (西沢 康広, Nishizawa Yasuhiro)
Yasuhiro is Ayumu and Kazuki's father.

Mrs. Nishizawa (歩と一樹の母, Ayumu to Kazuki no haha)
She is the wife of Yasuhiro and is Ayumu and Kazuki's mother.

== Segawa household ==
Izumi Segawa (瀬川 泉, Segawa Izumi)
Voiced by: Sayuri Yahagi (Japanese), Catherine Fu (English)
Izumi Segawa is the student representative for Hayate's class at Hakuō Academy. She is the younger fraternal twin sister of Kotetsu Segawa. Her family owns the game company - SAMY (a parody of SONY). She met Hayate when they were younger (volume 17 flashback) as she was getting attacked by a dog and gave him a kiss for saving her, as well as telling him she would be his bride when they're older; although she mentioned nothing about that incident when she first met Hayate at Hakuō Academy, possibly due to both parties not remembering each other. Like her friends, she addresses Hayate as "Hayata". Izumi gets along well with Hayate and is comfortable enough to even change clothes while he is in the same room (though not for him to actually watch her change). Later on, she realizes to have feelings for Hayate; it is confirmed when he gives for her 17th birthday cake. She calls herself a member "Red" of the Hakuou Three Amiga, and she mostly the protagonist among the group.

Kotetsu Segawa (瀬川 虎鉄, Segawa Kotetsu)
Voiced by: Go Shinomiya
Kotetsu Segawa is the combat butler of the Segawa family and the older fraternal twin brother of Izumi Segawa. As a running gag, his hobby is his extreme love of trains and train turntables. It seems that he has terrible luck with women that left him feeling bitter about the entire female gender, but while he is at Hinagiku's birthday party, he runs into Hayate and immediately falls in love with him, or rather his alter-ego Hermione. He soon learns of Hayate's identity from Izumi. Angered by this, he kidnaps Nagi in order to bring Hayate out. After Nagi confronts him on his shallow attitude towards love in general, he vows to change his attitude and still loves Hayate even after discovering that he is male. He seems extremely hung up on Hayate and uses various methods to try to spend time with him. Kotetsu is the only person whom Hayate really hates (besides his parents).

Stringer Segawa (瀬川 ストリンガー, Segawa Sutoringā)
Stringer is Izumi and Kotetsu's father. He is very protective of Izumi, particularly against males, to the point that Izumi must smuggle Hayate in as a girl, though the truth is later revealed. He does not appear to care much for Kotetsu, betting his life against Hayate's in order to gain Izumi's hand in marriage.

== Asakaze household ==
Risa Asakaze (朝風 理沙, Asakaze Risa)
Voiced by: Masumi Asano
Risa Asakaze is the head of the disciplinary committee for Hayate's class at Hakuō Academy. She is often seen hanging around her friends Miki and Izumi. She speaks in a rather boyish manner and likes to cause trouble for fun, which is ironic since she is the head of the disciplinary committee. Her family lives in a giant Shinto shrine. She calls herself a member "Black" of the Hakuou Three Amiga.

Risa's grandfather (理沙の祖父, Risa no sohu)
A very old man whose age is unknown. He is a swordsman and a very forgetful person who quickly forgets what he has done a few seconds ago.

== Hibino household ==
Fumi Hibino (日比野 文, Hibino Fumi)
Voiced by: Kana Asumi
Fumi is a first-year student of Hakuou who is first seen when she leaves for Hakuou and is usually seen alongside her close friend Sharna Alamgir. Her parents' names are Makie and Kunimasa. She often makes hilarious remarks about other people, unusually high ability in mathematics, and is very gullible as well. She addresses Hinagiku as a "visible panties person" when she first arrives and encounters Hinagiku standing on the branch of a tree rescuing a stranded cat, the same way Hayate did and comments that she can see Hinagiku's panties. She later appears (in chapter 306) where she was reunited with her big dog, Armageddon, with the help of Athena and Hayate after it stumbled into the Violet Mansion. She later fell in love with Hayate's brother upon meeting him at the beach in chapter 455. In the manga, Fumi expresses her wish to become the next president of the student council. According to the author, she is going to be the next future student council president of Hakuou, succeeding Hinagiku.

Armageddon (ハルマゲドン, Armageddon)
Armageddon is Fumi's dog, who usually goes around town to find free food. One day, he ended up at the Violet Mansion where he finds Alice (Athena) holding his favorite treat: a chocolate cornet. Later on, Armageddon grabbed Wataru's briefcase with 100 million yen then losses it to some bandits. Tama translates Armageddon where the money went; instead, this escalates into an argument between the two animals. Fumi explains that the reason why he loves Alice is likely because her hair "drills" resembles chocolate cornets.

== Tennousu household ==
Athena Tennousu (天王州 アテネ, Tennōsu Atene)
Voiced by: Ayako Kawasumi
Athena is an heir of the Tennousu family and is revealed to be one of the five directors in charge of Hakuou Academy in the manga. She has mainly appeared in the manga as the main heroine. She has been shown in the anime during a brief flashback where Hayate reflects on his first girlfriend. Her parents are presumed missing or dead since she lived alone. She is Hayate's ex-girlfriend, as well as his first Mistress, whom he met 10 years ago. Since he was very young at that time, he called her "A-tan" (アーたん Ā-tan) for short. He lived with her for a while at her castle "Royal Garden". There she taught Hayate how to do house chores. She even taught him sword fighting. She also healed Hayate's body and reinforced it with some kind of spell, which could be the reason for Hayate's power.

Both of them cared deeply for each other, to the point in which they decided to spend their life together. That decision was taken after Hayate worked really hard to get a present for Athena. He was able to get her a ring. Right after he gave her that ring, she told him that engagement rings came in pairs, and so she took a ring from one of her pockets and gave it to Hayate, saying both of them would wear those rings when they grow up. After this event, Hayate was able to convince Athena to live with him and his parents, and once so he decided to finally confront his parents and tell them about this. In the beginning, it seemed things were heading in a positive direction, but his parents betrayed him once again, by pawning the ring he had received from Athena, which he had entrusted them. Until in chapter 469, Athena has found the ring from Yukiji and got it back.

By the time Hayate had returned to the Royal Garden, Athena had already seen the things Hayate and his parents had. Athena told Hayate not to see his parents again, telling them they were the worst kind of people. After a short, but heated discussion, Hayate told Athena she wouldn't be able to understand him because she didn't have any parents. During their battle, Hayate notices giant spectra with the shape of a skeleton. Apparently, Athena was completely unaware of its presence. Once the battle was over, Athena told Hayate he could leave. Immediately afterward, Athena tried to call him back, but it was too late. Then, saddened because of Hayate's departure, she broke into tears, realizing she had ended up alone once again. After leaving the Royal Garden, Hayate began wandering in the streets aimlessly, as he was still deeply saddened because of his fight with Athena. Eventually and surprisingly, he met Ikusa, who told him to apologize. Hayate, following his brother's advice, tried to return but he could no longer reach the Royal Garden. At the end of volume 17, it was revealed that Mikado Sanzen'in, bought the land where the Royal Garden existed and built Hakuō Academy over it.

Athena and Hayate still dream about these events, even after 10 years. While Hayate expresses his longing to see Athena again. She referred to the dream as "extremely detestable", but then in her thoughts, she said: "Even though I've cried my tears dry that day, you still appear in my dreams..." Athena's earliest appearance is (in chapter 88) when Hayate explains the reason he doesn't deserve to be a boyfriend to Hinagiku and the others. She then appears (in chapter 144) when Hayate remembers her after saying that he's not good with girls; in chapter 172, Hayate cries about her when Izumi asks him what his first girlfriend was like; realizing she was right all along about his parents.

In chapter 233, Hayate finally meets Athena after 10 years. Much to his surprise, she shows no signs of remembering him and kicks him out. Afterward, she is shown calling out his name in private while blushing, revealing that she lied to him. Later, it is also revealed that she is also friends with Hinagiku, but didn't talk to her for a while because Hinagiku also gave her the same nickname "A-tan". In chapter 239, Hayate admits to Hinagiku (who was just about to confess to him) that he is in love with Athena.

After Hayate's fight with Machina, she was the one who treated him and brought him into the mansion. Later, Hayate manages to confront Athena. A fight ensues, where a skeleton hand attacks Hayate wherein later Isumi arrives to aid Hayate and confirms that the skeleton hand is King Midas an honored spirit possessing Athena because of a deal. Hayate was left to decide to destroy the King's Jewel and save Athena, but Nagi will lose the Sanzenin inheritance. After Nagi crushes the King's Jewel herself and entrusts Hayate in protecting her in the future, Hayate determines and manages to rescue Athena from King Midas. After King Midas is destroyed, Athena originally intends to stay with Hayate, however, she soon realizes that he cannot give up Nagi and so decides to part ways with him again (although on friendly terms this time), thereby settling their argument from the past. She later meets Nagi returning her hat but at the same time telling her that next time she will not return it (she is referring to Hayate) and gives her the empty ring box that Hayate got her. Athena has since made a re-appearance in chapter 300 (both as the current and younger Athena). Athena then hands Hayate the ring then asks him to become her butler convincing him that she really is Athena. The key to regaining it back was to stay with Hinagiku for at least 3 months (due to possessing the Shirosakura) at the Violet Mansion.

When the deadline draws near, Athena states that she will temporarily regain her original form thanks to a simplifying power on the grounds of Himegami's land - Violet Mansion. Athena proceeds to recover Ikusa's memory as she expresses thankfully to him for his past actions. Athena later discovers that her original form and memories were sealed inside one of the King's Jewels, and once learning that said jewel is in Hisui's possession, he and Hayate confront her to retrieve it (chapter 546). On the occasion, Hisui destroys the jewel, restoring Athena to normal, just to confirm that the power of the jewels and their connection to the Royal Garden are true. As the fateful battle for King Midas' power abruptly began on Christmas Eve because of Nagi's wish, Hisui and Hayate trapped asleep in a realm Athena commissions at the Hakuou clock tower to counter it all by using a VR helmet (a NerveGear, from Sword Art Online) to make contact. After the battle, Athena is shown together with Machina.

Machina (マキナ, Makina)
Athena's butler. To date, he has only appeared in the manga. He appears to be slow on the uptake and is frequently called an idiot by his mistress, much to his chagrin. He loves hamburgers, but despite his small frame, he was strong enough to lay a near-fatal blow onto Hayate. He had also stated that he is not human, Machina seems to have the ability of superhuman strength just like Hayate does, he also has a hidden skill to transform himself into a giant serpent (which is his true form) with a jewel in its forehead. Machina gives Hinagiku the long white sword, Shirosakura to help Hayate save Athena. After the Golden Week arc, Machina is found at Sakuya's mansion (in chapter 408), and she feeds him food endlessly.

== Hatsushiba household ==
Hisui Hatsushiba (初柴 ヒスイ, Hatsushiba Hisui)
Hisui is Mikado's niece and Nagi's childhood friend, known for her boundless greed, thus Mikado intends to keep her from inheriting the Sanzenin fortune at all costs, fearing how much of a threat she would be with so much wealth at her disposal. It is shown in after the Doujinshi arc, she has Yozora as her loyal servant, spying on available candidates, such as Hayate, Ruka, and Nagi because Hisui plans to open the gateway and obtain the Power of Royalty that can only be done by a person's broken heart holding a King's Jewel, and she also has intel on Athena Tennousu. Hisui and Yozora were planning to use Ruka as the main candidate to gain access to Royal Garden due to her mistaking Hayate for a girl but she managed to overcome it and is no longer available. Hisui will stop at nothing until she gets what she wants. When the battle concludes, Nagi decides to give Hisui the "Loto's Key" believing things will be settled later. Displease with Nagi's generosity, Hisui attacks Hayate's parents in retribution for how their greed had ruined her plans. She is the central antagonist competing in the manga series.

Jenny (ジェニー, Jenī)
Voiced by: Rina Satō
Jenny is the younger sister of Hisui, and a friend of Nagi's; she appears in a flashback accompanying Nagi in Africa where they find Tama. Despite being four-years-old in the flashback, Jenny looks nothing like her age and carries a lighter in the shape of a rifle. She also claims to have ninja skills.

Yozora Housen (法仙 夜空, Hōsen Yozora)
Yozora first appeared in chapter 285, after secretly launching a bottle rocket attack at Hayate as he attempted to transport Tama to the new apartment-house residence, Violet Mansion. She planned to rent a room there but was rejected by Nagi due to her flirtatious ways with Hayate. Chapter 433 reveals that Yozora serves as a maid to Hisui. When a valuable photo of an old man is found in the Violet Mansion, she is given the mission to retrieve it, going so far as to conjure (apparently via magic) a couple of robots, culminating with her crashing Ruka's concert in order to retrieve the said photo. She continues to spy on the Violet Mansion that Nagi and residents live in, and when Hayate, Linn, and Tama discover the coffin from the Royal Garden in a formerly secret room of the building, Yozora attacks and is engaged by Isumi. Yozora's powers are strong enough to withstand Isumi's incredible powers. It's possible that Yozora's the daughter of King Midas who supposedly been turned into fossilize gold.

== Hakuou Academy ==
Hayate, Nagi, Isumi, Wataru/Kayura, Hinagiku, Izumi, Kotetsu, Risa, and Fumi attend Hakuō Academy.

=== Students ===
Chiharu Harukaze (春風 千桜, Harukaze Chiharu)
Voiced by: Ayumi Fujimura
Chiharu Harukaze is the Secretary of the Student Council, known for her cold and serious personality. However, she seems to share Nagi's interest in anime and video games, but only shows this side of her to Nagi and Hayate. Secretly, she works as Sakuya's maid; she uses the alias Haru when her father's company goes bankrupt, but nobody in the Hakuō Academy is aware of this, with the exception of Aika Kasumi. Chiharu may have a serious, hardworking nature. Currently, she stays at the Violet Mansion as a tenant when her house caught fire while her parents were practicing making Motsunabe. And as a result, has gotten close to Nagi due to the similar hobbies they have. Chiharu invited her to a doujinshi convention with hopes of restoring Nagi's "burning spirit". She introduced Nagi to the Author of the doujinshi "Flying Dolphin" that she helped sell, Ruka Suirenji. Ever since then, she has been helping Nagi to write and publish her own manga, going around with her to come up with ideas for it. Nagi gets close to Chiharu the point where she tells of her first meeting with Hayate, leading Chiharu to discover their true relationship.

Kayura Tsurugino (剣野 カユラ, Tsurugino Kayura)
Voiced by: Yōko Hikasa
Kayura Tsurugino appears at the end of chapter 336 of the manga as a replacement of Wataru Tachibana for Hakuou. Kayura met Nagi in a park in chapter 342 and they talk about Nagi's manga. It is shortly revealed that she has been living inside a tent set up in the park and was almost arrested by a police officer until Hayate stepped in and managed to pass it off as a misunderstanding. Afterward, Kayura becomes a new tenant in Violet Mansion. It is revealed that due to her parents she has always been around anime, manga, and games since she was born and had read over 100,000 manga. She is also very supportive of cosplay, and according to Hayate and Nagi she is an "elite otaku". It said she is named after Lady Kayura from Ronin Warriors. Hayate asked her to become an adviser for Nagi's manga, but she refused. Kayura reveals that before her family ran a small video game company, they were once assistants for a manga artist named Nikaku Hyouzan, then returned to Hokkaido. Kayura then later gave advice to Nagi, to not make it simple to understand manga like how Ruka and Hinagiku are doing, but to do the opposite, and make the manga the way she thinks it's right, no matter others' opinions. Kayura, Nagi, and Chiharu become very good friends.

Miki Hanabishi (花菱 美希, Hanabishi Miki)
Voiced by: Eri Nakao (Japanese), Muriel Hoffman (English)
Miki Hanabishi is a member of the student council and the vice-representative for Hayate's class at Hakuō Academy. She specializes in investigation work, which may be the result of being the daughter of an important government official. She has a mischievous nature, especially when it involves Hayate or Hinagiku, and suspects Hinagiku's feelings for Hayate. She is implied to hold feelings for Hinagiku. Like Nagi, she dislikes exercising. Her friends Izumi and Risa are often seen with her. She calls herself a member "Blue" of the Hakuou Three Amiga.

Aika Kasumi (霞 愛歌, Kasumi Aika)
Voiced by: Emiri Katō
Aika Kasumi is the Vice President of the Student Council. Like many other Hakuō Academy students, she comes from a rich family. While she may be seen as a sweet, kind, and gentle girl to most people, secretly she is also very manipulative and takes advantage of any situation she sees, a fact that only Hinagiku and Chiharu are aware of. Aika is often considered a "love master" for her excellent advice in dealing with females' pride.

Despite this, she does care about her friends and would never betray them. For example, when she learned that Chiharu was secretly working as a maid for Sakuya, she hid this secret from everyone despite the fact that she wrote it down in her weak notebook in order to remember it. She also has a pendant (King's Jewel) similar to Hayate's and Wataru's. She later appears in Mykonos, and gave advice to Hayate about Hinagiku, and suggest him to have dinner with her in chapter 224. It is revealed later that she had some relationship with Athena. She also appears to have a fiancé.

Kotaro Azumamiya (東宮 康太郎, Azumamiya Kōtarō)
Voiced by: Rina Satō
Kotaro Azumamiya is the master of Kaede Nonohara and a member of the kendo club. He is 16 years old, the same age as Hayate. He is considered the weakest member of the club because his strikes are random and dangerous. He has a vulgar mouth, which obligates Kaede to scold him accordingly in his duty to refine his master into a gentleman. When he is in trouble, he calls for Kaede to fight for him and, with the exception of Hayate, always picks fights with those with the highest possibility of being weaker than he is. Out of jealousy, he challenges Hayate to a duel when he sees him being friendly with Hinagiku. He is often beaten up mercilessly by Kaede for his weaknesses. Recently, he has lost his self-esteem ever since Kaede went to study abroad in England. When going to Mt. Takao, he tried to recruit Hayate so he reminds him of Kaede's words of complimentary. He is the only character introduced so far whose endurance is worse than Nagi's. Recently, it has been shown that various members of his family are manga artists and that he himself works as an assistant for Gouji Ashibashi.

He has a crush on Hinagiku (Episode 16, 27) and is jealous of Hayate simply because he called her "Hinagiku" instead of "Ms. Katsura".

Himuro Saeki (冴木 ヒムロ, Saeki Himuro)
Voiced by: Kōsuke Toriumi (Japanese), Jack Murphy (English)
Himuro Saeki is the 17-year-old combat butler of the Ookouchi family. He is usually seen smelling a single rose or reading a book while his master throws rose petals behind him. Himuro loves money more than anything in the world, but he does not try to gain the Sanzen'in inheritance because he already has his master's money. Himuro robs Hayate of his necktie in their first meeting so Hayate gives him the nickname "necktie man" in the manga. In the anime, this nickname is changed to "Prince Necktie".

Like Klaus, he throws roses like daggers. He can also create a rose whip and can use a powerful move that involves striking the opponent with rose petals. He is very agile and is able to stand on the side of trees. Unfortunately, he has a glaring weakness against money. In fact, Klaus "defeats" him by offering him a large sum of money, and he strangely begins to bleed profusely as if struck immediately after. His ultimate attack has yet to be revealed. Despite being greedy, he does care for the well being of his master.

Taiga Ookouchi (大河内 タイガ, Ōkouchi Taiga)
Voiced by: Saki Nakajima (Japanese), Catherine Fu (English)
Taiga is Himuro's master, but it is difficult to tell which one is the master and which one is the butler. Taiga follows Himuro around throwing rose petals creating a rose storm. He can be mistaken for a little girl at first due to his voice and appearance. Taiga's hairstyle changed in the anime. He does not have a short ponytail in the manga but gets one in later chapters. He is 10 years old. He has a crush on Himuro, evidencing that he is homosexual.

Sharna Alamgir (シャルナ・アーラムギル, Sharuna Āramugiru)
Voiced by: Saori Gotō
Sharna is an international student from India, and seems to belong to a royal family. She is often seen with Fumi Hibino and nags at her whenever Fumi acts foolishly.

=== Faculty ===
Kyonosuke Kaoru (薫 京ノ介, Kaoru Kyōnosuke)
Voiced by: Satoshi Hino
Kyonosuke Kaoru is a gym teacher at Hakuō Academy. He is usually seen building Gundam models in the staff room or during lunch and adores fancy cars. He spends all his money buying Gundam models and even borrows money from Yukiji to buy more. He is 28 years old but he is still single and without a girlfriend. In episode 29 of the anime, it is revealed that Kyonosuke has feelings for Yukiji, whom he has known from childhood. During the Golden Week vacation, he and Yukiji went to Italy. While staying there, Kyonosuke confesses to Yukiji.

Kirika Kuzuha (葛葉 キリカ, Kuzuha Kirika)
Voiced by: Megumi Toyoguchi (Japanese), Candice Moore (English)
Kirika Kuzuha is the Superintendent of Hakuō Academy who first appears asking Yukiji to tell Hayate that he had failed the entrance exam. In the anime, she possesses a power level three times that of an ordinary person, but the moment she uses all her energy, she drops to the floor until she consumes a lot of sweets. She tends to do extreme things to kill her boredom, going as far as to put sharks in the school pool and changing the school trip to the Amazon. Thus, she is an enemy to the students and the student council. She's also bisexual, having a fierce and romantic relationship with her female butler Shion, and being attracted to both Hayate and Hinagiku. This is due to both being good looking and cute, and the former's femininity and the latter's masculinity.

In the anime, Kirika and Shion are the antagonists manipulated by a Jörmungandr in Season 1 as guardians of the Amazon treasure (ancient butler robe) for unknown years. Hayate, with his newfound power, managed to defeat the Jörmungandr once and for all in episode 39.

Shion Kuresato (暮里 詩音, Kuresato Shion)
Voiced by: Marina Inoue (Japanese), Catherine Fu (English)
Shion, whose name is "poem" and "sound" in kanji, is a devoted butler of Kirika Kuzuha. She first faced Hayate after Kirika loses her energy while attacking him. She's also one of the reasons why Hayate joined the Butler Battle Tournament. She has an amazing aura, so much so that she can create her own "territory" (reminiscent of certain characters in Yu Yu Hakusho/Poltergeist Report). However, if her shoes are knocked off, she reverts to her real middle school child form, which is powerless. She pampers them superintendent with sweets and makes sure that she is always contented and happy. She does however seem to share the same sexual interest in girls and boys.

=== OB ===
Kaede Nonohara (野々原 楓, Nonohara Kaede)
Voiced by: Katsuyuki Konishi
Kaede Nonohara is the 18-year-old combat butler of the Azumamiya family. He appears to have white hair and an almost always smiling face. His eyes are always closed and he is very polite. He encourages his master to be a gentleman and to be manly enough to fight his own battles even if he were to lose.

In contrast with his gentle and polite exterior, Kaede is very brutal, senselessly beating his master when he acts like a weakling. In combat, whenever Kotaro asks for his help, he does the opposite, either throwing him into the battle zone or beating the boy up. Kaede is very quick and is able to do a Tatsumaki Senpuukyaku-like (hurricane kick) attack. His ultimate attack is the "Safety Shutter: Grand Explosion Immolating Dark Murder!", which is a fire attack released from the edge of his sword in the shape of a dragon that engulfs the opponent in flames. Kaede's only weakness is seeing his master getting hit by his own ultimate attack. Despite his ultimate attack being strong, he was defeated by Hayate in episode 19.

Currently Kaede has graduated and left for England to continue his butler studies.

== Shiomi High School ==
Ayumu also attends Shiomi High School.

Souya Minamino (南野 宗谷, Minamino Sōya)
Voiced by: Satoshi Hino
Souya is one of Hayate and Ayumu's friends who attends Hayate's previous high school, Shiomi. According to Ayumu, he's really (and only) good at swimming. During the Mykonos trip, while exploring the underground water tunnel with Nagi, Ayumu mentions that she learned a lot from a book on swimming that Souya lent her. In chapter 75, Souya and his friends from Shiomi run into Hayate, after catching up with him at a restaurant they unwittingly leave Hayate with their bill for 50,000 yen. Later, Souya visits the Sanzenin Mansion to repay Hayate for their restaurant bill. He is aware of Ayumu's crush on Hayate. In chapter 443, Souya reappears to stand for Hayate to reconnect with his older brother. He is also the protagonist of Hata Kenjirou's previous work, Heroes of the Sea Lifesavers.

Natsumi Seto (瀬戸 美海, Seto Natsumi)
Natsumi is one of Hayate and Ayumu's friends who attends Hayate's previous high school, Shiomi. She is Souya's childhood friend. She's good at cooking but bad at swimming. Natsumi can't swim for 10 years since she nearly drowned while she was on a boat with Souya at the sea. Later, while thinking about her future Ayumu notices Natsumi announcing to the Shiomi swim club that she'll become a lifeguard but she'd have to be able to swim 10 meters (chapter 359).

== Church of Alexander Mark ==
Sonia Shaflnarz (ソニア・シャフルナーズ, Sonia Shafurunāzu)
Voiced by: Yui Horie
Sonia Shaflnarz comes from a family part of the Sicilian mafia. She is born in Mykonos Island, Greece. Her surname suggests that she is Italian. She met Hayate at the train, to the point of saving him from a muscular debt-ridden anime fan. In the English version, she speaks in an Italian accent. She moves to Japan in order to get revenge against the Sanzenin family, because her father died due to the family, though not directly. In "Extra- Radical dreamers" of chapter 41, her father hid in a trash can to assassinate Nagi on Mykonos island, but Hayate prevented it and defeated him. After that, he quit the mafia and went to Japan to become a cook. He then died because he didn't know that there was poison in blowfish. Sonia impersonates Sister Fortesia, a sister from the Church of Alexander Mark and the Tiger's Pit for Butlers for the purpose of approaching Hayate and the Sanzenin family, with an M.H.E robot in control. She speaks fluent Japanese, but she uses harsh words and blames it on the fact that she does not know Japanese very well. Sonia has unbelievable strength and fighting ability, and uses tonfas as weapons.

In volume 8, it is revealed that she has some feelings for Wataru, going to his DVD rental store and growing extremely jealous when she sees him expressing concern over Saki. However, when Saki is kidnapped, she uses the situation to get Wataru to kiss her on the cheek in exchange for Saki's rescue. By the time Hayate (who was on the scene at the time of Saki's kidnap) reaches the kidnappers on his bike, he finds that the kidnappers are already tied up, their car impaled by a telephone pole in the shape of a cross, and Saki looking confused and unhurt on the side.

Sonia is also one of the people trying to get the Sanzenin fortune. During Hayate's and the other's trip to Mykonos, Sonia attempted to steal the King's Jewel from Hayate. It seemed that she was either in collaboration with Gilbert Kent or she simply used him. Sonia attacked Hayate with the use of seduction. During their fight, Ayumu was nearby causing Hayate to panic if she misunderstood the situation. Taking advantage of the opportunity Sonia took the pendant and ran to her home but Ayumu who earlier met Sonia was told where her home was located. Ayumu and Hayate arrived at her home and Hayate told Sonia to give up. However, Sonia refused and threatened to destroy the stone so that no one will get the inheritance. Sonia originally wanted the stone to use the inheritance to make her chances of ending up with Wataru better. So when Ayumu reasoned with Sonia that the one she fell in love with was not the type to notice someone because of money, she finally gave up and returned the King's Jewel to Hayate.

Linn Regiostar (リィン・レジオスター, Ryin Rejiosutā)
Voiced by: Junichi Suwabe
Linn Regiostar is the priest of the Church of Alexander Mark who died and became a ghost. He is apparently an RPG and dungeon crawler fanatic as he became a spirit because he died from a poison arrow trap in a dungeon he built underneath the church using all the church's donations. He has a cross-shaped scar on his forehead similar to Shiranui and Ikusa Ayasaki. At first, he was spiritually bound to the dungeon, but after it was destroyed, he appears in the outside world and now moved to Nagi's mansion, where he follows and haunts Hayate. Unfortunately for Hayate, only people who have been in the dungeon before can see him. Despite being a father he is perverted and is fond of Maria. However, he does appear in front of Hinagiku in volume 9, trying to guide her confused feelings towards Hayate, although the conclusion that she reaches is not the one that he was expecting.

His pervert actions like making Isumi dressed as a maid, peeking under the skirt of a female model, and possessed Sakuya, and saying some dirty words. He is currently residing in one of the rooms in Nagi's apartment building, which he filled up with his anime and manga collection (which Hayate stated he would destroy). Linn sensed a suspicious aura within the Violet Mansion, later revealed to be a secret room that holds the coffin that Hayate saw in the Royal Garden.

Viz has translated the priest's name as "Rean Radiostar." Before he died, he seemed particularly fond of the Ultima and Dragon Quest series, even to the point of calling himself Akiba's "Lord British".

Fortesia Neas (フォルテシア・ニース, Foruteshia Nīsu)
Voiced by: Toshiko Maeda
A nun at the Church of Alexander Mark whom Sonia impersonates. She is over 60 years old.

== Villains ==
Yakuza (ヤクザ, Yakuza)
Aniki Voiced by: Hiroshi Shirokuma
Kashiwagi Voiced by: Tōru Nara
Ayatei Voiced by: Jun Ōsuga
The Yakuza are represented by three katana-wielding men in suits. One of them sometimes carries a chihuahua around. They are first seen taking Hayate away to harvest his organs, presumably attempting to kill him in the process, until a mysterious hero called "Mask the Money" (actually Nagi in disguise) stops them and buys Hayate's debt off them. Later, they run into Hayate after he saved Isumi and tell him that they actually like him despite their shady relationship with him. They then get into a fight with Isumi's bodyguards, which then evolves into a free-for-all after Hayate tries to leave without helping them. In the anime, they are referred to as the "nice men" or "very kind people".

In the manga, Kashiwagi the guy with the scar across his eye, makes a re-appearance in chapter 269 as Hayate attempts to find a house for 20 million yen when Nagi forfeits her inheritance.

Kidnapper Brothers (2人組誘拐犯, Futarigumi Yūkaihan)
Voiced by: Kenji Hamada
Voiced by: Satoshi Hino
Two brothers who owe money to the Yakuza. They attempt to get money by obtaining ransom by kidnapping. They kidnap Nagi and later Saki.

Las Vegas' Thieves
A gang of black men in masks armed with grenades those mugs in Las Vegas where Nagi and the group took a trip there during Silver Week. They steal Yukiji's money and her car with the Black Camellia. Hayate rescues Izumi from them at an abandoned motel when Ruri tries to take the Black Camellia from a thief who had it then accidentally stabs Hayate with it, which he ends up switching souls with Shin. Yukiji battles the remaining thieves at the Starside hotel then Isumi inadvertently defeats the boss.

== Shiori Makimura's robots ==
Eight (エイト, Eito)
Voiced by: Rina Satō
Eight is an orange robot in love with his creator. He was created to be the ultimate nursing robot by the Sanzen'in Technology Division. He is waterproof and equipped with "nursing missiles" and rocket boosters. Eight's downfall is his quick temper. He snaps after being called "ugly" and seeks revenge after he is defeated. Through his dialogue, he reveals that he only desires revenge in order to prove himself to the one he loves: his creator. Sadly, Shiori has a habit of being totally dismissive of him, going as far as telling him she made a "mistake" in putting him in line for incineration when he actually needed to be trashed in a more appropriate category. Nonetheless, he eventually gets a reprieve after his latest upgrade, when he becomes Shiori's boyfriend after finally confessing to her.

Eight receives an upgrade before each appearance. He is upgraded to v8.1 after his first defeat, upgraded to v8.2 before meeting Hayate in the amusement park, v8.3 after he becomes a couple with Shiori, and upgrades his form after Shiori is transferred to Hakuou Academy. In the anime, Eight upgrades himself to v8.1 after he steals the control chip from Nursing Robot Nine and upgrades to 8.2 as his second form, but he is reverted to v8.1 after he is beaten by Yukiji and Hayate.

Prototype Seven (プロトタイプセブン, Purototaipu Sebun)
Prototype Seven is a mecha created by Shiori Makimura for Gilbert Kent. It has Eight's version 8.1 operating system and data installed, the most violent version of Eight. Prototype Seven is supposedly controlled by the control chip, but it was left out by mistake because it was being built when Shiori was falling asleep. As a result, Gilbert loses control and violently searches for Nagi and Hayate. Hayate finally destroys it using an HK MG3.

Mecha Butler Thirteen (メカ執事13号, Meka Shitsuji Jūsan-Gō)
Voiced by: Rina Satō
Thirteen is the mecha-butler who serves Nagi while Hayate learns to take the school's term-examination. At first, Hayate thinks of him as the same as other mechas who made many problems for him and the Sanzen'in household before, but then, Thirteen is actually a talented mecha-butler. He makes Nagi and Maria happier than Hayate does, but eventually, Nagi chooses Hayate rather than Thirteen.
In the anime, he risks his life for saving the Sanzenin household (as well as everybody else) from a meteor falling to the Earth.

Security 8801/9801/X68000 (警備8801, Keibi 8801)
Security robots that protect the Sanzenin mansion. They fought against the Cockroach Man with the "jet stream attack" from Mobile Suit Gundam. Their names are based on the NEC PC-8801, NEC PC-9801, and X68000, which are early consumer desktop PCs sold only in Japan.

Ell (エル, Eru)
A female robot created by Shiori Makimura that was eventually going to get scrapped. Fumi takes Ell out of pity when she is requesting a robot to assist her in becoming a lifesaver. Although Shiori claimed Ell can be rather lewd, Ell has a high attitude for hunger and demands rice and seafood no matter what the expense.

== Non-human characters ==
Voice of the Heavens (天の声, Ten no Koe)
Voiced by: Norio Wakamoto
Voice of the Heavens is the narrator of the series. Throughout both the anime and the manga, he narrates what happens in the series while at the same time mocking and ridiculing the characters about what they are doing, with frequent snarks at the absurd plot and the silly nature of the story. Some of the cast can hear him and respond accordingly. He appeared in episode 50 of the anime as a tall man, Teruo Mikiri, with no face hosting a quiz game. In the third and fourth seasons, Hayate and the heroine characters mostly do the narrating.

Orumuzuto Nadja (オルムズト・ナジャ, Orumuzuto Naja)
Voiced by: Rina Satō
Orumuzuto Nadja appears mostly on the first page of each volume of the manga. She claims to be a goddess. She exists outside the world of Hayate no Gotoku, greeting the reader, making comments on the manga, and conducting character interviews. She acts like a TV host and carries around a microphone. Nagi does not get along with her. Nadja makes one appearance in the manga in chapter 9, appearing on TV with her eyes censored and voiced changed. Nadja's only appearance in the anime is in episode 7 as a lifeless doll. On every character CD except for Saki and Wataru's, she conducts an interview.

Nadja presents a larger role in flashback. Revealed that Nadja made acquaintances with Nagi at Shimoda years ago, telling her something important. Nadja is mention to actually be the goddess who can grant wishes in exchange for 50 years of the person's lifespan, unless, they're in possession of the Power of Royalty. She happened to be sealed in the Royal Garden by King Midas.

Maou (魔王, Maō)
Maō Voiced by: Yūko Gotō
Gaikotsu Voiced by: Hiroshi Shirokuma
Maō the Great Stygian of Abe (Temp) is a demon and the last boss of the game that Nagi is playing in episode 10. She is cute, naive, and incredibly busty, and wears a talking skull named Gaikotsu on her head, who punishes her when she tries to help the good guys. Maō is chained to her chair and resides in her fortress on top of a tower. She tries to capture a hero from the outside world using her guillotine fishing rod, to play the game and send her to the underworld. Maō ends her sentences with tima which could be an Ultima reference. She also appeared on episode 50 as a host of the quiz game and appears on the inner cover comic (the one under the dust jacket featuring Orumuzuto Nadja) of Volume 13.

Maya (マヤ, Maya)
Voiced by: Yukari Tamura
Maya is an alien that appears in Shimoda trying to find its misplaced spaceship when looking for the best hot spring. Nagi helps Maya find it being held at the Saginomiya's place. Later, Nagi almost got carried into space inside the spaceship after a fight with Hayate. Hayate comes to save Nagi when she called for him in tears, and Maya sends them home. Waking up near Yukariko's grave.

Maya is the alien similar to a drawing that was drawn by Nagi during her childhood.

Dolly (ドリー, Dolly)
Voiced by: Akemi Kanda
Dolly is a wood druid spirit who has lived for many unknown years and is assisted by Ruri and Shidou in Season 3 (only). At first, she appears to have a calm, dark demeanor. Her goal is to use the Black Camellia to extend the life of her lover's "King" soul who is trap inside it, unaware it is Shin her former assistant who is actually inside it, due to a car accident he ended up switching souls with the king; going to great lengths to gain possession over it that's now in possession of the Sanzen'in family. Dolly also appears to have magical powers, being able to block Isumi's spell tags, and able to manipulate plants at will. In the end, Dolly disappears into the sky after learning her lover has been dead for quite some time and Nagi reveals that her king's last words were that he always and still loves her.

Her story looks a lot like the one that was told by Ruka in episode 7, her being the nymph that served a prince and helped him gain immortality. She is revealed as one of the five directors in charge of Hakuō Academy under the name Kananiwa wearing a King's Jewel in the manga.

King Midas (ミダース, Midāsu)
An enigmatic spirit, it is the figure of the legendary King Midas that is said to be the greedy person with the ability to turn all things into gold. He controls Athena Tennousu, with his goal to achieve his true form by consuming Athena's mind through possessing her, as well as his desire for his precious symbol, the King's Jewel. According to Isumi, he possesses people with extremely lonely hearts. He is said to wreak havoc in this world, by turning worlds into massive gold which signifies the end of the world as stated by Isumi. His second form is revealed in the Golden Week Arc, triggered by his anger, which is shown as a huge skeletal flying bat with numerous spikes in his body and wings, carrying Athena on his body. He speaks through Athena by using her body as a medium, causing her to speak in a scary voice. In this form he is much stronger than his first form, resentfully attacking Hayate whom he seems to have mistaken for someone who cut his arm in the past, who is revealed to be Hayate's older brother Ikusa. He sends massive armies into the world by using the King's Jewel replica, but after it is destroyed all of his armies vanish. He is defeated by Hayate who uses Masamune to slash through Midas' body to reach Athena. Hayate reaches in and pulls Athena away from Midas. This causes Midas to lose his link to the human world. According to his character profile (volume 18), King Midas has a daughter.

== Other characters ==
Ruka Suirenji (水蓮寺 ルカ, Suirenji Ruka)
Voiced by: Haruka Yamazaki
The third female protagonist Ruka Suirenji is Chiharu's friend. She first met Chiharu when she praised one of Ruka's doujinshis. Later, she is helped by Hayate (in Hermione form) and it is revealed that she is a singer (in chapter 297); later on, she is found out to be a full-blown idol. Ruka was raised for 16 years to be an artist to fulfill her parents' ambition and make it on a grand scale. However, they went broke by investing in her and finally left her along with the debt of 150,281,000 yen on Christmas Eve similar to Hayate. Ruka makes her formal appearance in chapter 280 when Chiharu tells Hayate a few things of her life resemble his.

She appeared on the final day of Golden Week when Chiharu and Nagi attended a doujinshi convention. Ruka is then seen where Hayate was fighting a robot summoned by Yozora. In the chaos, she was injured. Hayate convinced her to trust him and agreed to carry her to her destination, passing the cosplay grounds where she mistakenly assumed Hayate is a girl. She gave him a backstage pass and asked him to follow her to the changing room. Her manager Atsumari (集) burst in and asked who's Hayate, Ruka responded that "she" is her relative, who is helping out for the day. Later, Ruka appeared in front of a large audience, including Nagi and Chiharu. Nagi thought Ruka was like a goddess upon first seeing her on stage. Then, Yozora's robot appeared and had gone berserk. Due to this, Hayate was then forced to get rid of it. Ruka did a spectacular back-flip before singing one last song and she successfully drew the audiences' attention back to her.

Ruka re-appears when suddenly she comes to visit Chiharu at the Violet Mansion and to her surprise, she finds Hermione (Hayate). Therefore, Hayate asks for a song as he thinks her voice is beautiful which they go to karaoke. That night, Ruka befriends Nagi, and afterward, she learns Hayate's name, (which she finds as a commanding good name even if she believes he is a girl) Ruka tells Hayate that if he was a guy she would have already fallen in love with him then embraces him; he also realizes that Ruka really straightforward, honest, and naïve. Hayate hesitates to reveal his true gender to her but Hinagiku claims that he has to confess sooner or later.

One day at her apartment, Ruka collapsed from being overworked and saved by Hayate. Atsumari suggests that a health manager be brought in for Ruka's sake and Hayate accepts the position. One morning, Ruka caught Hayate wearing a butler uniform which leaves her confused. She decided to go to the Hakuou to personally ask Hayate if he indeed is a guy or just a girl that loves cross-dressing, recommended by Maria. She arrives at Hakuou clock tower, along the way, she bumps into Izumi who is covered in ink and gets her all dirty and goes to the bath so they could clean themselves. Much to her surprise, Hayate is also in the bath and this flustered Hayate for Ruka still doesn't know that he is a boy. Afterward, Ruka takes off the towel covering her body and bathes with him. Hayate couldn't continue lying to her anymore; then Izumi comes in complete exposure. Ruka finally finds out Hayate is a boy (in chapter 326) and becomes embarrassed then leaves. Hayate later saved her from getting hit by a truck and promised to grant one of her wishes one day as an apology even if its costs his life, she forgives and agrees to trust him once more with a smile.

Hayate asks Ruka if she could help Nagi with her manga since both of them are manga authors. After the Comisun event, Ruka soon becomes more focused on manga rather than working as an idol and left her apartment then moved into the Violet Mansion when Atsumari bans her from doing more drawing. Hayate learns about Ruka's debt which Atsumari reveals after discovering Hayate's not Ruka's relative. Later, Hayate receives a phone call from Atsumari, who warns him that Ruka is suffering from Gastritis. Isumi takes Hayate and Ruka to the Rainbow Village to where they can relax. In chapter 382, when the two were alone in the cabin cause of a sudden downpour, Ruka listens to Hayate's story about why he became a butler then she reflects on her feelings for him and kisses him! Ruka makes a bet with Nagi on the doujinshi competition if she wins she can pay off Hayate's debt and date him. When she realizes that Hayate has no intention of quitting as Nagi's butler, she decided her "wish" that Hayate promised to grant would be for him to marry her. When Nagi and many of the tenants went to Kyoto to improve her manga, Atsumari gives Ruka an urgent call rather she chooses to quit or continue singing and announce her live concert in Las Vegas (which will happen in Can't Take My Eyes Off You). At first, Ruka wanted to quit, but Hayate gave her second thoughts (in chapter 419) and seeing how much the audience admire her. In chapter 428, when Ruka thought she had lost to Nagi at the doujinshi competition, she has an unexpected reunion―her parents! They came back to apologize to Ruka for abandoning her, and she gives them her last manga copy, Time Traveler, as a way of thanking them. Soon after, Ruka claims that music is for the sake of her own dream. When she and Hayate celebrate a summer festival's fireworks together they share their regrets—implying that Hayate really does love Ruka. She is next seen performing a Christmas festival during the battle for the Power of Royalty, witnessing Hinagiku and Himegami's sword-fighting in midair, with the audience and Ruka thinking it's part of the stage's effects. Ruka and Nagi made a promise to have another doujinshi competition in ten years.

Ruri Tsugumi (ツグミ・ルリ, Tsugumi Ruri)
Voiced by: Yuka Iguchi
Ruri is a mysterious girl who appears at the beginning of the 3rd season, introducing herself as Nagi's little sister with no proof. She has poor handwriting but is good at systema. Nagi realizes her true agenda and then arranges her to live at the Violet Mansion. Ruri addresses Nagi as "big sister" in order to gain her devotion. She even buys a doujinshi that Nagi drew saying it is her favorite. Ruri and Nagi began to show signs of caring for each other throughout the series. Her goal is to find the Black Camellia for her adoptive mother, Dolly, who rescued Ruri when she was abandoned by her parents in an unknown desert. Locating the Black Camellia among a bunch of thieves in Las Vegas who are trying to make their escape, Ruri takes them out with her skills but is cut short after Isumi attacks Dolly causing Ruri to attack her in anger, giving Shidou enough time to retreat with Dolly before retreating herself. Ruri later grabs the Black Camellia from Nagi before succumbing to its bad luck, Nagi then requests Ruri's help by bringing Dolly's "ring" to her, as Hayate's life depends on it. She is seen mourning Dolly's death while holding Shin's wedding ring, afterwards, she returns the ring to Nagi before departing with Shidou. In the manga, Ruri is associated with Mikoto Tachibana.

Hokuto Kaga (加賀 北斗, Kaga Hokuto)
Voiced by: Daisuke Hirakawa
Hokuto Kaga is a friend of Hinagiku's who runs a small café owned by Sakuya called Café Donguri. Hinagiku helps him out there occasionally, and at one point, Hayate, Nagi, and Ayumu begin work there part-time. Hokuto allows Hayate to make cookies there for Ayumu on White Day, and Nagi plans to use the money she earns there for Hayate's birthday present soon. Hokuto also appears to help run Sakuya's maid cafe, Himawari.

Gouji Ashibashi (足橋 剛治, Ashibashi Gōji)
Voiced by: Masaya Onosaka
Gouji Ashibashi is a manga artist. Troubled over the story development in his manga he comes to Café Donguri while Hayate, Nagi, and Ayumu are working there. He indiscriminately proposes to Maria, Hayate saved her by convincing the manga artist that Maria is a man. Azumamiya works as his assistant at the animation studio. In chapter 289, where Gouji agrees to take a look at Nagi's manga. But after seeing his manuscript, Nagi realizes the big gap between pros and amateurs, same with Ruka.

Konoha Makise (木の葉牧瀬紅莉栖, Makise Konoha)
A former employee who guarded the Sanzenin's vault. She worked to support her family in chapter 463. She is sensitive to pressure. Hayate encountered her (in a bikini) in his effort to access the secret bridge leading to the vault. He finds her a serious challenge in getting hold of the bridge button that she was hiding in her breasts, however, he managed to bribe her with 128,500 yen, then succeeded to obtain a King's Jewel from the vault. Soon after, he borrowed the money from Maria then visits Konoha to see her household living in misery. Konoha's little brother Kanta teases of her attachments to Hayate. Hayate offers to help Konoha apply for a suitable job. She also falls in love and kisses him as well (though he tried to avoid it).

Dr. Kurosu (黒須, Isha Kurosu)
Kurosu is a traveling doctor whom Nagi meets on the streets of Hokkaido while having to be lost and exhausted. She offers Nagi a ride in her Lamborghini to Kyoto & Ise, and also assists in helping her manuscript for a good manga. Kurosu gives Hayate a secret task to make Ruka happy. It is revealed that Kurosu gave service to her patients, Ruka's parents, when it is explained that after forcing their debt on Ruka they had a major accident in Hokkaido, taking it as a divine punishment, then later being recovered thanks to Kurosu's treatment. Since they weren't sure whether to meet Ruka again or not, Kurosu has Hayate and Hinagiku give them excellent advice because they understand how they feel (unlike Hayate's parents). After Ruka's family reunion, Kurosu explains to Hayate that she recently got Ikusa as a patient with amnesia, and provides him Ikusa's location.

Jouji Kashiwagi (柏木 譲二, Kashiwagi Jōji)
Voiced by: Ryosuke Morita
An elderly plainclothes detective who took charge of an armed robber case that tried to take hostages at a restaurant where Hayate, Yukiji, Sonia, and Ruri/Himuro fight over who pays the bill. Yukiji took the robber hostage instead when the others escape, except Hayate. Hinagiku intervenes when Jouji showed her the crime scene, then the robber turns himself into Jouji and the police after feeling guilt for robbing. Jouji appears again (in chapter 155) when Saki was concern about Wataru's feelings.

Santa Claus
Voiced by: Tomoyuki Shimura
Santa Claus first appeared to Hayate in a dream when he was eight years old, telling him he had to work in order to live. He was Hayate's prime source of motivation, and the sole reason he worked so hard at such a young age and onwards. Outside of Hayate's head, he appeared as a doctor after Hayate saves Nagi from a kidnapping. In the anime, Santa takes the role of other minor characters such as a delivery man, a construction worker, a monster in a game, a waiter, Klaus's playschool evaluator, a grocery store clerk, and a garbage man. Inside Hayate's imagination, Santa Claus looks much like Mikado. It is confirmed in chapters 435-436.

== Anime-exclusive characters ==
Jishukisei-kun (自主規制君)
He is the pink-haired genie who censors objectionable materials on the show with a sign that says "Can't show this" in Season 1. He also appears in Episode 50 as the mascot of the quiz game and the driver for the quiz cars.

Tanuki (たぬき)
A bluish-purple tanuki that is introduced from inside the Kurotsubaki, it makes cameo appearances in the fourth season.

Shidou (シドウ, Shidō)
Voiced by: Hitoshi Yanai
Shidou is shown wearing a bird-like mask, underneath the mask he has long silver hair and blue eyes. He is usually seen wearing a dark purple suit along with a matching dark purple two-layered cape (resembling bird feathers) with gold trim. He can use ninjutsu like moves to animate birds and can teleport people. He is an accomplice by Ruri Tsugumi.

Cockroach Man (ゴキブリマン, Gokiburi man)
Voiced by: Go Shinomiya
A human-sized cockroach that appears crawling out of a well to kill those who watch the cursed videotape called "The Wakka" (episode 19). He is exterminated by Isumi, but thanks to him, Maria developed a crush on Hayate.

Michael & CHITT (走り屋・チャット, Hashiriya Chatto)
Michael Voiced by: Jūrōta Kosugi
CHITT Voiced by: Akio Nojima
Michael and his automated car, "CHITT", challenge Hayate and Nagi to a highway race. Michael ordered CHITT to use a rocket booster in order to get through the curve, but they crashed and fell down from the highway. After their victory, Hayate and Nagi have arrived at the Kujukuri Beach on time to see the sunrise for New Year's Day (episode 40). The two-character are base on Knight Rider that Michael as Michael Knight and CHITT as KITT.

Schmidt hen Bach (シュミット・ヘン・バッハ, Shumitto Hen Bahha)
Voiced by: Daisuke Namikawa
Schmidt hen Bach is the head butler at the beach resort where the beach class goes to from Hakuō Academy in episode 18. His mission is to create fun summer memories for them, but the activities end up being unenjoyable for the students because they are only fun for him. Schmidt uses various mechs from other anime to help create these fun memories. He also owns two large mechas, with one resembling Zambot 3 and the other resembling the Lancelot from Code Geass (which explains partially why he resembles Suzaku Kururugi).

Itsuki & Shunji (イツキとシュンジ, Itsuki to Shunji)
Itsuki Voiced by: Akeno Watanabe
Shunji Voiced by: Mikako Takahashi
The two siblings that become lost around Sanzenin mansion and found by Hayate in episode 31. They attempt to act as Nagi's little brothers as Nagi wants to take care of the younger children the same way as Sakuya did to her. Later on, they steal the bag that Sakuya has set up and got caught. However, Sakuya shows her kindness and let them go.

The two characters are base on Saint Seiya that Itsuki as Phoenix Ikki and Shunji as Andromeda Shun.

Alastair B. Sebastian (アレスター B. セバスチャン, Aresutā B. Sebasuchan)
Voiced by: Kenta Miyake
A businessman, who welcomed Hayate to his company, called the "Victoria Elizabeth Steward Dispatch Company", otherwise known as the international butler dispatch company in episode 51. Alastair offered Hayate a new job, and if he accepts the 150 million yen so that Hayate will pay off his debt to Nagi. But, Hayate declined that offer, because he said to Alastair that he will pay his debt back by working for Nagi. Later, it reveals that Mikado set up that offer in order to test Hayate's loyalty.

=== The League of Dark Butlers ===
(Note: All the Dark Butlers that serve Kirika Kuzuha except Shion and Nabeshin are parodies/combinations of characters portrayed by their voice actors)

Puppet Butler (あやつり執事, Ayatsuri Shitsuji)
Voiced by: Jun Fukuyama
Puppet Butler is the fifth mysterious dark butler, making an appearance in episode 33, who bribes Kirika Kuzuha with sweets to let him attack Hayate. He wears a mask, top hat, and a black cloak. He looks like Kimihiro Watanuki from xxxHolic and has hypnotism powers as well as a personality resembling that of Lelouch Lamperouge from Code Geass (characters which, are done by the same voice actor). With it, he (loosely) controls Nagi to bring Hayate to him. The Puppet Butler piloted a Dinosaur Robot and as he, Hayate, and Hinagiku prepare for battle, his robot breaks into pieces, as he knew that it wasn't well made. Nagi's hypnosis wore off when she tasted Hayate's special cake.

Cyborg Butler (サイボーグ執事, Saibōgu Shitsuji)
Voiced by: Nobuyuki Hiyama
Cyborg Butler appears in episode 38. He resembles a cross between Guy Shishioh from GaoGaiGar and Viral from Gurren Lagann, two anime characters also voiced by the same actor. He has a tendency to scream dramatically and shout "Gagagagagaga" while running and possesses similar attacks to GaoGaiGar, including Drill Knee, Broken Magnum, Hell and Heaven, and the Goldion Hammer (though named differently). He also uses Guy's infamous catchphrase when using the Goldion Hammer: "Hikari ni Nare!!" (literally meaning "Be reduced to light!!"). He defeats Hayate easily due to Kuzuha draining Hayate's "Butler Power" away, but when he attempts to retreat afterward, he is destroyed by Himegami.

Butler Nabeshin (ナベシン執事, Nabeshin Shitsuji)
Voiced by: Shinichi Watanabe
Nabeshin is a famous anime director and Lupin III wannabe from the anime Excel Saga. He appears in episode 32, with an afro hairstyle. After introducing himself as a dark butler to Hayate, He quickly pulls out a gun and shoots at Hayate, after dodging the hail of gunfire much to his surprise Hayate sees an exhausted Nabeshin working on an anime rough draft, then informing him that he's only a part-time butler, He then reintroduces himself as an anime producer and director. After seeing that he is succumbing to hunger Hayate invites Nabeshin and his family to the mansion for a meal but is later kicked out by him for taking advantage of his hospitality.

Nabeshin is later seen making a cameo in episodes 34, 35, 40, 43, and 44.

== Game-exclusive characters ==
Mikage Watarase (渡良瀬 ミカゲ, Watarase Mikage)
Voiced by: Megumi Nakajima
A mysterious spirit that dwells within the underground Sanzenin library. She is an exclusive character that only appears in Hayate no Gotoku!!: Nightmare Paradise. Hayate and the "heroine" prevent Mikage from crystallizing herself any further. They convince Mikage to try to live in the outside world.
