= Hayate the Combat Butler =

Japanese manga series

- Cover of the first manga volume, featuring Hayate Ayasaki (left) and Nagi Sanzenin (right)

ハヤテのごとく! (Hayate no Gotoku!)
- Genre: Harem; Romantic comedy; Slice of life
- Manga
- Written by: Kenjiro Hata
- Published by: Shogakukan
- English publisher: NA: Viz Media
- Imprint: Shōnen Sunday Comics
- Magazine: Weekly Shōnen Sunday
- Original run: October 6, 2004 – April 12, 2017
- Volumes: 52
Further information
Anime television series
Hayate the Combat Butler!
Directed by	Keiichiro Kawaguchi
Produced by	Naohiko Furuchi; Shinichi Iwata
Written by	Shinichi Inotsume; Junki Takegami
Music by	Kōtarō Nakagawa
Studio	SynergySP
Licensed by	NA: Sentai Filmworks
Original network	TXN (TV Tokyo)
English network	SEA: Animax Asia
Original run	April 1, 2007 – March 30, 2008
Episodes	52
Light novel
Written by	Toshihiko Tsukiji
Illustrated by	Kenjiro Hata
Published by	Shogakukan
Imprint	Gagaga Bunko
Original run	May 24, 2007 – March 18, 2008
Volumes	2
Original video animation
Directed by	Yoshiaki Iwasaki
Written by	Yōsuke Kuroda; Taku Satō
Music by	Kōtarō Nakagawa
Studio	J.C.Staff
Released	March 6, 2009
Runtime	24 minutes
Anime television series
Hayate the Combat Butler!!
Directed by	Yoshiaki Iwasaki
Produced by	Shinichi Iwata; Tomoya Negishi
Written by	Yōsuke Kuroda; Hideki Shirane
Music by	Kōtarō Nakagawa
Studio	J.C.Staff
Licensed by	NA: Sentai Filmworks
Original network	TXN (TV Tokyo)
English network	SEA: Animax Asia
Original run	April 3, 2009 – September 18, 2009
Episodes	25
Anime television series
Hayate the Combat Butler: Can't Take My Eyes Off You
Directed by	Masashi Kudō; Yōichi Ueda (series director)
Produced by	Sayako Muramatsu; Akio Matsuda
Written by	Rie Koshika
Music by	Wataru Maeguchi
Studio	Manglobe
Licensed by	NA: Sentai Filmworks
Original network	TXN (TV Tokyo)
English network	PH: GMA Network; SEA: Animax Asia
Original run	October 4, 2012 – December 20, 2012
Episodes	12
Anime television series
Hayate the Combat Butler: Cuties
Directed by	Masashi Kudō; Yōichi Ueda (series director)
Produced by	Sayako Muramatsu; Akio Matsuda
Written by	Rie Koshika
Music by	Wataru Maeguchi
Studio	Manglobe
Licensed by	NA: Sentai Filmworks
Original network	TXN (TV Tokyo)
English network	SEA: Animax Asia
Original run	April 8, 2013 – July 1, 2013
Episodes	12
Original video animation
Directed by	Yōichi Ueda
Written by	Shinichi Inotsume
Music by	Wataru Maeguchi
Studio	Manglobe
Released	June 18, 2014 – December 18, 2014
Episodes	3
Other
Hayate the Combat Butler! Heaven Is a Place on Earth (film); Hayate the Combat Butler (live-action drama)
- icon

Hayate the Combat Butler (Japanese: ハヤテのごとく!, Hepburn: Hayate no Gotoku!; lit. 'Like a Gale!') is a Japanese manga series written and illustrated by Kenjiro Hata. It was serialized in Shogakukan's Weekly Shōnen Sunday magazine from October 2004 to April 2017. Shogakukan released 52 volumes in Japan from February 2005 to June 2017. Viz Media publishes an English edition in North America. It follows Hayate Ayasaki, a teenager who becomes a butler for the wealthy Nagi Sanzenin to repay his enormous debt, while dealing with other girls. The series includes numerous references to other anime, manga, video games, and popular culture, while frequently breaking the fourth wall.

A 52-episode anime adaptation of the manga by SynergySP aired between April 2007 and March 2008 on TV Tokyo. A second, 25-episode anime season by J.C.Staff aired between April and September 2009. Bandai Entertainment licensed the first anime series in 2008, but the series went out of print in 2012. An anime film adaption produced by Manglobe was released in August 2011. A third, 12-episode anime television series by Manglobe, based mostly on an original story not seen in the manga aired between October and December 2012. A fourth anime season aired between April and July 2013. Sentai Filmworks has licensed all four seasons of the anime.

== Plot ==
Hayate Ayasaki is an unlucky 16-year-old boy who has worked since childhood to make ends meet due to his parents' irresponsible behavior. On Christmas Eve, he finds out his parents have run away from home while shouldering him with a massive ¥156,804,000 ($1,048,164) debt. The Yakuza (from whom the money was borrowed in the first place) plan to settle the debt by selling his organs and selling him into slavery. While running away from the debt collectors, Hayate meets Nagi Sanzenin, a 13-year-old girl and the sole heir of the wealthy Sanzenin estate, and her maid Maria. At first, Hayate plans to kidnap Nagi and acquire a ransom of over ¥150 million but due to a misunderstanding, Nagi thinks Hayate is confessing his love to her. After he rescues Nagi from actual kidnappers, she hires Hayate as her new butler.

Aside from performing his ordinary duties as a butler, Hayate must fight to protect Nagi from harm, a difficult task since her life is always in danger because she is the target of individuals who covet her family's fortune, and sometimes must deal with her extravagant requests, oblivious to Nagi's true feelings for him. Later in the story, Hayate must juggle the feelings of several other girls, Ayumu Nishizawa, his former classmate; and Hinagiku Katsura, the student council president of Hakuō Academy. Hayate had a romantic relationship with a childhood friend, Athena Tennousu, who is chairwoman of the board of Hakuō Academy.

Due to the events of Golden Week, involving Hayate and Athena, Nagi ends up forfeiting her inheritance. With the last of her savings, Nagi and Maria move with Hayate to an old apartment building called "Violet Mansion" owned by her late mother Yukariko, and rents its extra rooms for income: having Chiharu Harukaze, the secretary of Hakuō Academy; Hinagiku, Ayumu, Athena (in child-form), Kayura Tsurugino, an "elite otaku"; and Ruka Suirenji, a pop idol who also develops feelings for Hayate, as its tenants.

After a series of adventures with the tenants, Nagi manages to reclaim her fortune. On an excursion in America, Hayate finally pays off his massive debt, but decides to keep working as Nagi's butler, especially when the battle for the Sanzenin inheritance intensifies. Athena eventually regains full strength and Maria resigns as Nagi's maid. On Christmas Eve, the "misunderstanding" of Hayate and Nagi's relationship is exposed, creating a rift that leads to the final battle. Hayate rescues Nagi from the godly Royal Garden, but she decides to relinquish her status as an heir and concedes the rights to her cousin Hisui Hatsushiba, before firing Hayate to set him free. Two years later, a self-sufficient Nagi reunites with Hayate in the place they met for the first time, where he tells her that despite not being her butler anymore, he still wants to be with her, and that there is "something he needs to tell her", before locking hands and walking together under the starry night sky.

== Media ==
=== Manga ===
Hayate the Combat Butler is written and illustrated by Kenjiro Hata. It began serialization in Shogakukan's Weekly Shōnen Sunday magazine on October 6, 2004, (Note: It started in the magazine's 45th issue of 2004 (cover date October 20), released on October 6 of that same year.) and concluded on April 12, 2017. Shogakukan collected its 570 individual chapters in 52 tankōbon volumes, released from February 18, 2005, to June 16, 2017. A 27-volume kanzenban edition started publishing on June 16, 2023.

Viz Media publishes the manga in North America and released the first volume on November 14, 2006. As of February 13, 2024, 43 volumes have been released.

=== Anime ===
The Hayate the Combat Butler 52-episode anime aired on TV Tokyo in Japan between April 1, 2007, and March 30, 2008, produced by animation studio SynergySP and with music by Kōtarō Nakagawa. The series also aired on the CS television network Animax starting on October 25, 2007, where it received its satellite television premiere, and was shown uncensored. The series was licensed in North America by Bandai Entertainment in 2008, but in February 2012, the company stopped releasing titles beyond February 7, and in April of the same year, the rights to the series were dropped, making the releases out of print. Sentai Filmworks has since re-licensed the series for a digital and home video re-release.

An original video animation (OVA) episode was released on March 6, 2009, in DVD and Blu-ray formats. A second anime season of Hayate the Combat Butler, titled Hayate the Combat Butler!! (an additional exclamation mark) aired 25 episodes between April 4 and September 18, 2009, produced by animation studio J.C.Staff. Unlike the first season, the second season retcons the events of the first season by claiming at the onset that a month has passed since Hayate became Nagi's butler. Furthermore, the second season is more faithful to the manga than the first season. On July 21, 2010, Animax Asia began airing the second season, including the OVA, with English dubbing done again by Red Angel Media along with Cantonese and Mandarin dub. The second season has been licensed by Sentai Filmworks.

An anime film adaptation, produced by Manglobe and directed by Hideto Komori titled Hayate the Combat Butler! Heaven Is a Place on Earth, was released in Japanese theaters on August 27, 2011. The film was licensed for streaming and home video release by Sentai Filmworks in August 2015. A third anime television series, titled Hayate the Combat Butler: Can't Take My Eyes Off You and produced by Manglobe, aired 12 episodes between October 4 and December 20, 2012. Instead of being a sequel to the 2009 anime series, Can't Take My Eyes Off You features a new story written in part by the original creator Kenjiro Hata and is mostly based on his original ideas that never made it to the manga. Despite that, the third season takes place chronologically nine months after the beginning of the first, and six months after the second, eventually becoming part of the main series canon. The third season has been licensed by Sentai Filmworks and was released on DVD and Blu-ray on April 28, 2015. A fourth anime television series, titled Hayate the Combat Butler: Cuties, aired between April 8 and July 1, 2013, and is basically composed of short stories, each one focused on one of the main characters from the manga. The fourth season has been licensed by Sentai Filmworks. A three-part OVA series produced by Manglobe was released as part of the series' tenth anniversary between June 18, 2014, and December 16, 2014.

=== Light novels ===
A light novel based on the series, written by Toshihiko Tsukiji and illustrated by Kenjiro Hata, was released on May 24, 2007, published by Shogakukan under their GAGAGA Bunko label. The novel includes a doppelgänger and barrier that Maria encounters, Isumi Saginomiya's magic that happens in front of Nagi's eyes, and the corruption of the building of the Film Analysing Club (You Tobe) that Izumi Segawa, Miki Hanabishi, and Risa Asakaze were members of.

A second light novel entitled Nagi is the Familiar!? Let it ★ World Conquest (ナギが使い魔!?やっとけ★世界征服, Nagi ga Tsukaima!? Yattoke Sekai Seifuku) was released on March 18, 2008. The title is the combination of The Familiar of Zero and the phrase which is similar to Lucky Star's first opening theme, "Take It! Sailor Uniform" (もってけ!セーラーふく, Motteke! Sērāfuku). The cover of this novel features Nagi wearing Louise's costume. Insert images are drawn by Kenjiro Hata and Eiji Usatsuka, the illustrator of The Familiar of Zero light novels.

=== Video games ===
A video game by Konami for the Nintendo DS (NDS) titled Hayate no Gotoku! Boku ga Romeo de Romeo ga Boku de (ハヤテのごとく!ボクがロミオでロミオがボクで, Hayate the Combat Butler! I am Romeo and Romeo is Me) was released in Japan on August 23, 2007, with an A rating by CERO. A limited edition of the game was released on the same day which included a Hakuō Academy student notebook and a drama CD. The gameplay has the player assuming the role of Hayate Ayasaki and follows a branching plot line which offers pre-determined scenarios with courses of interaction.

A second NDS video game was released in two versions on March 14, 2008, titled Hayate no Gotoku! Ojō-sama Produce Daisakusen Bokuiro ni Somare! (ハヤテのごとく!お嬢さまプロデュース大作戦 ボク色にそまれっ!) with a B rating by CERO, but the versions differ between their story settings. One game is set at the Sanzen'in's mansion, and the other one is set at Nagi's school. The gameplay has the player again assuming the role of Hayate Ayasaki and focuses on Nagi as the main character who the player trains; she may also learn some attacks or tricks to make an appeal at contests. Players are able to control where characters go and talk to gather information in continuing the story. Players may easily trade data with other players using wireless connections (however, the game is not Wi-Fi compatible). Similar to the 2007 game, there are many Konami parodies included. For both the 2007 and 2008 games, there are a couple of hidden stories or voices that can be made available by passwords. A third video game titled Hayate no Gotoko!! Nightmare Paradise (ハヤテのごとく!! ナイトメアパラダイス) was released on March 26, 2009, for the PlayStation Portable with a B rating by CERO.

=== Live-action TV series ===
The Taiwanese network GTV aired a live-action television adaptation of Hayate the Combat Butler between June and September 2011.

=== Music and audio CDs ===
The first anime series has two opening themes and four ending themes. The first opening theme is "Hayate no Gotoku!" (ハヤテのごとく!) by Kotoko released on May 23, 2007, and the second opening theme is "Shichiten Hakki Shijōshugi!" by Kotoko released on October 17, 2007. The ending themes are: "Proof" by Mell released on May 30, 2007, "Get my way!" by Mami Kawada released on August 8, 2007, "Chasse" by Kaori Utatsuki released on November 21, 2007, and "Ko no Me Kaze" (木の芽風) by Iku released on March 19, 2008. The second anime series has two opening themes and two ending themes. The first opening theme is "Wonder Wind" by Elisa and the second opening theme is "Daily-daily Dream" by Kotoko. The first ending theme is "Honjitsu, Mankai Watashi Iro!" by Shizuka Itō (with Eri Nakao, Sayuri Yahagi and Masumi Asano) and the second ending theme is "Karakoi: Dakara Shōjo wa Koi o Suru" by Rie Kugimiya and Ryoko Shiraishi. The opening theme of the third anime series is "Can't Take My Eyes Off You" by Eyelis, and the ending theme is "Koi no Wana" (恋の罠, Love Trap) by Haruka Yamazaki. The opening theme for the fourth anime series is "Haru Ulala♡Love yo Koi!!!" (春ULALA♡LOVEよ来い!!!) by Shizuka Itō, and there are 12 ending themes by each of the various characters' voice actors.

There are twelve character song albums sung by the main characters from the anime adaptation. The first two were released on May 25, 2007, and feature songs sung by Ryōko Shiraishi as Hayate Ayasaki and Rie Tanaka as Maria. The last two, released on July 25, 2007, feature songs sung by Rie Kugimiya as Nagi Sanzenin and Shizuka Itō as Hinagiku Katsura. Miyu Matsuki as Isumi Saginomiya and Kana Ueda as Sakuya Aizawa was released on September 21, 2007. Marina Inoue and Saki Nakajima as Wataru Tachibana and Saki Kijima, as well as Mikako Takahashi as Ayumu Nishizawa was released on November 21, 2007. Hitomi Nabatame as Yukiji Katsura and Sayuri Yahagi, Eri Nakao, Masumi Asano as Izumi, Miki, and Risa was released on January 25, 2008. Two duet character albums starring Hermione Ayasaki and Nagi, and Maria and Hinagiku were released on March 21, 2008.

The original soundtrack was released on June 22, 2007, and a drama CD based on the anime adaptation was released on August 22, 2007. On September 21, 2007, volume one of a two-CD radio drama called Radio the Combat Butler was released.

=== Additional merchandise ===
Additional notable merchandises include many school related goods which were released near the start of the anime series in March and April 2007. Many other goods such as clocks, mugs, and posters were released a few months after. In 2008, a 1/8 scale (approx. 21 cm or 8.25") figurine series (entitled, "Hayate no Gotoku! Collection Figures") created by Jun Planning was released. Maria was released in March. Hinagiku figurine with Masamune in her hand was released on June 19. Nagi figurine with video game controller was released in July. Also, Kotobukiya released a series of 1/6 scale swimsuit figurines. Hinagiku was released in January 2009; Nagi in April 2009, and Ayumu in May 2009. Shogakukan released an art book titled Hayate the Combat Butler Official Box on November 16, 2007.

== Reception ==
Over ten million copies of the manga and other Hayate-related books have been sold in Japan by January 2009; by June 2022, the manga had over 20 million copies in circulation; by September 2023, the manga had over 21 million copies in circulation. Carlo Santos of Anime News Network gave Volume 14 of the manga a C+, citing Hata's overextension of a complex work with multiple simultaneous plotlines and constant scene changes. He does note that Sakuya's birthday party as an example of the work's strong point. Chris Beveridge of Mania.com gave part six of the anime an overall B rating. Although, in his opinion, the storyline and nature of the anime has not changed much, he was suddenly captivated. Beveridge sums up these feelings for the final episodes by noting that they "had a certain flavor and flow to them that left me pretty happy, which is a surprise after five volumes that left me feeling ambivalent at best."
