= Shizuka Itō =

Japanese voice actress (born 1980)

- 伊藤 静
- Born: December 5, 1980 (age 45); Tokyo, Japan
- Other names: Maya Takashi (高志 麻矢); Suno Toba (鳥羽 すの); Teruka Neno (祢乃 照果); Rina Misaki (美咲 里奈/三咲 里奈)
- Occupations: Voice actress; singer
- Years active: 2003–present
- Agent: Ken Production
- Notable work: Fire Emblem as Byleth (female); El Cazador de la Bruja as Nadie; A Certain Magical Index as Kaori Kanzaki; Jormungand as Koko Hekmatyar; Okami-san and Her Seven Companions as Ryoko Okami; D.Gray-man as Lenalee Lee & Lero; Sailor Moon Crystal as Minako Aino/Sailor Venus; Beelzebub as Hildegarde; Hayate the Combat Butler as Hinagiku Katsura; Assassination Classroom as Irina Jelavić; High School DxD as Akeno Himejima; Prison School as Meiko Shiraki

Shizuka Itō (伊藤 静, Itō Shizuka; born December 5, 1980) is a Japanese voice actress and singer from Tokyo, Japan. She is represented by Ken Production. She won a "Best Actress in Supporting Roles" award at the 10th Seiyu Awards for her roles in Prison School and Sailor Moon Crystal. She is well known for her anime voice roles as Akeno Himejima in High School DxD, Sailor Venus/Minako Aino in Sailor Moon Crystal, Kaori Kanzaki in A Certain Magical Index, Lenalee Lee in D.Gray-man, Irina Jelevic in Assassination Classroom, Meiko Shiraki in Prison School, Koko Hekmatyar in Jormungand, Ryoko Okami in Okami-san and Her Seven Companions, Hilda in Beelzebub, Hinagiku Katsura in Hayate the Combat Butler, and many.

She and fellow voice actress Hitomi Nabatame formed a voice acting unit called "Hitomi Nabatame and Shizuka Itō". Together they are known by the name Hitoshizuku (ひとしずく), which is Japanese for "a single droplet". In 2012, she announced that she had gotten married. On April 30, 2020, Itō announced that she had gotten divorced.

== Filmography ==
=== Television animation ===
Year	Anime	Role	Note
2003	BASToF Lemon	Tiel	
2003	Kaleido Star	Maggie	
2003	Shingetsutan Tsukihime	Akiha Tohno	
2003	Texhnolyze	Ran	
2004	Aqua Kids	Surea	
2004	Koi Kaze	Wakaba Anzai	
2004	Maria-sama ga Miteru	Rei Hasekura	
2004	Maria-sama ga Miteru ~Haru~	Rei Hasekura	
2005	Canvas 2: Niji Iro no Sketch	Hikari Tamaru	
2005	Gakuen Alice	Tanuki	
2005	Glass Mask (Tokyo Movie version)	Norie Otobe	
2005	Gokujō Seitokai	Miura	
2005	Ichigo Mashimaro	Keiko Yano	
2005	Mahoraba ~Heartful Days~	Club President	
2005	Mahō Sensei Negima!	Misa Kakizaki	
2005	SoltyRei	Silvia Ban	
2005	Starship Operators	Sinon Kouzuki	
2005	To Heart 2	Tamaki Kosaka	
2005–2006	Tsubasa Chronicle	Chun Hyang	
2005	Zatch Bell!	Elizabeth, Chita	
2005	Zoids: Genesis	Kotona Elegance	
2006	.hack//Roots	Saburo	
2006	Animal Yokochō	Ako-sensei; Yayoi-kun, Usagi, Potato Tuto	
2006	Asatte no Hōkō	Shōko Nogami	
2006	D.Gray-man	Lenalee Lee, Lero	
2006	Futari wa Pretty Cure Splash Star	Izumida Captain, Okai-sensei	
2006	Glass Fleet	Sillua Moe Silvernail; Bride (ep 1); Zola (John-Fall's subordinate)	
2006	Happiness!	Saya Kamijo	
2006	Hell Girl	Noriko Hayashi	ep 22
2006	MÄR	Lillis	
2006	Negima!?	Misa Kakizaki	
2006	Pumpkin Scissors	Alice L. Malvin	
2006	Shakugan no Shana	Wilhelmina Carmel	
2006	Tona-Gura!	Miu Serizawa	
2006	Witchblade	Shiori Tsuzuki	
2006	xxxHolic	Himawari Kunogi	
2006	Yoake Mae Yori Ruri Iro Na ~ Crescent Love ~	Wreathlit Noel/Fiacca	
2007	Baccano!	Rachel	
2007	Buzzer Beater	Io	
2007	D.C. II: Da Capo II	Mayuki Kōsaka	
2007	Darker than Black: Kuro no Keiyakusha	Alice Wang	
2007	El Cazador de la Bruja	Nadie	
2007	Getsumento Heiki Mina	Suiren Koushū	
2007	Hayate the Combat Butler	Hinagiku Katsura	
2007	Kaze no Stigma	Nanase Kudō	
2007	Magical Girl Lyrical Nanoha StrikerS	Shario Finīno, Otto, Deed	
2007	Nagasarete Airantō	Chikage	
2007	Rental Magica	Manami Kuroha	
2007	Shakugan no Shana Second	Wilhelmina Carmel	
2007	Sketchbook ~full color's~	Hā-san	
2007	Sky Girls	Eika Ichijō	
2007	Tengen Toppa Gurren Lagann	Boota, Darry	
2008	D.C. II: Da Capo II	Mayuki Kōsaka	
2008	Kimi ga Aruji de Shitsuji ga Ore de	Kuonji Shinra	
2008	Toaru Majutsu no Index	Kaori Kanzaki	
2008	Wagaya no Oinari-sama.	Momiji Miyabe	
2008	xxxHolic: Kei	Himawari Kunogi	
2008	Yatterman	Ai-chan/Yatterman 2	
2008	Blassreiter	Amanda Werner	
2008	Sekirei	Benitsubasa	
2009	Kurokami: The Animation	Riona Kogure	
2009	Saki	Hisa Takei	
2009	Tayutama: Kiss on my Deity	Mifuyu Kisaragi	
2009	Basquash!	Sela D. Miranda	
2009	Hatsukoi Limited	Kei Enomoto	
2009	Hayate the Combat Butler!!	Hinagiku Katsura	
2009	Maria-sama ga Miteru 4th season	Rei Hasakura, Seito	
2009	Shakugan no Shana S	Wilhelmina Carmel	
2010	Dance in the Vampire Bund	Nanami Shinonome	
2010	Nodame Cantabile: Finale	Tatiana "Tanya" Vishneva	
2010	HeartCatch PreCure!	Momoka Kurumi	
2010	Ichiban Ushiro no Daimaou	Etou Fujiko	
2010	Ōkami-san to Shichinin no Nakama-tachi	Ryōko Ōkami	
2010	Working!!	Kozue Takanashi	
2010	Amagami SS	Haruka Morishima	
2010	Ore no Imōto ga Konna ni Kawaii Wake ga Nai	Iori Fate Setsuna	
2010	Sekirei ~Pure Engagement~	Benitsubasa	
2010	Marvel Anime: Iron Man	Nanami Ōta	
2010	Strike Witches 2	Hanna-Justina Marseille	
2010	Toaru Majutsu no Index II	Kaori Kanzaki	
2010–2013	Pocket Monsters: Best Wishes!	Bel/Bianca	
2010	Katanagatari	Zanki Kiguchi	
2011	Beelzebub	Hildagarde	
2011	Ro-Kyu-Bu!	Mihoshi Takamura	
2011	Shakugan no Shana III Final	Wilhelmina Carmel	
2011	Tamagotchi!	Agetchi	
2011	Working'!!	Kozue Takanashi	
2011	Maji de Watashi ni Koi Shinasai!	Christiane Friedrich	
2011	Maken-ki!	Kikyo Yamato	
2012	Aesthetica of a Rogue Hero	Liliana	
2012	Amagami SS+ plus	Haruka Morishima, Jessica Morishima	
2012	Shimajirō Hesoka	Various Voices	
2012	Area no Kishi	Nana Mishima	
2012	Bodacious Space Pirates	Misa Grandwood	
2012	Daily Lives of High School Boys	Senpai	
2012	Fairy Tail	Flare Corona	
2012	Hayate the Combat Butler: Can't Take My Eyes Off You	Hinagiku Katsura	
2012	High School DxD	Akeno Himejima	
2012	Jormungand	Koko Hekmatyar	
2012	Jormungand: Perfect Order	Koko Hekmatyar	
2012	Kokoro Connect	Maiko Fujishima	
2012	One Piece	Lily Enstomach	
2012	Queen's Blade Rebellion	Captain Liliana	
2012	Psycho-Pass	Yayoi Kunizuka	
2013	Space Battleship Yamato 2199	Melda Dietz	
2013	Majestic Prince	Teoria	
2013	Gargantia on the Verdurous Planet	Bellows	
2013	Maoyū Maō Yūsha	Firedrake Empress	
2013	Hayate the Combat Butler: Cuties	Hinagiku Katsura	
2013	High School DxD New	Akeno Himejima	
2013	Dog & Scissors	Suzuna Hiiragi	
2013	Unbreakable Machine-Doll	Kimberly	
2013	Fate/kaleid liner Prisma Illya	Luviagelita Edelfelt	
2014	Psycho-Pass 2	Yayoi Kunizuka	
2014	Saki: The Nationals	Hisa Takei	
2014	SoniAni: Super Sonico the Animation	Kyōko Tomano	
2014	D-Frag!	Takao	
2014	Date A Live II	Ellen Mira Mathers	
2014	Blade & Soul	Yuran	
2014	Fate/kaleid liner Prisma Illya 2wei!	Luviagelita Edelfelt	
2014	Pretty Guardian Sailor Moon Crystal Season I	Minako Aino/Sailor Venus	ONA, Dark Kingdom arc
2014	The Irregular at Magic High School	Kyōko Fujibayashi	
2014	Terra Formars	Michelle K. Davis	
2014	Shirobako	Chiemi Dōmoto, Suzuka Itō, Aya, Catherine Weller	
2015	Pretty Guardian Sailor Moon Crystal Season II	Minako Aino/Sailor Venus	ONA, Black Moon arc
2015	Assassination Classroom	Irina Jelavic	
2015	Bikini Warriors	Valkyrie	
2015	Crayon Shin Chan	Oohara Nanako	
2015	Fate/stay night: Unlimited Blade Works	Luviagelita Edelfelt	
2015	Fate/kaleid liner Prisma Illya 2wei Herz!	Luviagelita Edelfelt	
2015	Gintama	Okita Sougo (female)	
2015	Heavy Object	Major Froleytia Capistrano	
2015	High School DxD BorN	Akeno Himejima	
2015	Prison School	Meiko Shiraki	
2015	The Rolling Girls	Kaguya Nayotake	
2015	Aikatsu!	Nise Kisha	
2015	Beautiful Bones: Sakurako's Investigation	Sakurako Kujō	
2015	Working!!!	Kozue Takanashi	
2015	Yatterman Night	Alouette, Dorothy	
2015	Young Black Jack	Maiko Okamoto	
2016	Pretty Guardian Sailor Moon Crystal Season III	Minako Aino/Sailor Venus	TV Anime, Death Busters arc
2016	Nurse Witch Komugi R	Ai Mitaka	
2016	Assassination Classroom 2nd Season	Irina Jelavic	
2016	Endride	Louise	
2016	Joker Game	Marie Torres	
2016	Amanchu!	Mato Katori	
2016	Haven't You Heard? I'm Sakamoto	Miki	
2016	Rin-ne	Raito	
2016	Ange Vierge	Aoi Mikage	
2016	Lostorage incited WIXOSS	Lil	
2016	Occultic;Nine	Tōko Sumikaze	
2016	ReLIFE	Michiru Saiki	
2016	Idol Memories	Misaki Kariya	
2016	JoJo's Bizarre Adventure: Diamond Is Unbreakable	Tomoko Higashikata (second voice)	
2017	ēlDLIVE	Saotome	
2017	Sin: The 7 Deadly Sins	Belial	
2017	ACCA: 13-Territory Inspection Dept.	Eben	
2017	Kado: The Right Answer	Ritsu Natsume	
2017	Knight's & Magic	Hellvy Oberi	
2017	Restaurant to Another World	Red Queen	
2017	Chronos Ruler	Ice Raider	
2017	Food Wars! Shokugeki no Soma: The Third Plate	Rindou Kobayashi	
2017	Altair: A Record of Battles	Cassandra	
2017	Battle Girl High School	Aoi Narushima	
2018	Laid-Back Camp	Minami Toba	
2018	Katana Maidens ~ Toji No Miko	Minato Fujiwara	
2018	High School DxD HERO	Akeno Himejima	
2018	Layton Mystery Tanteisha: Katori no Nazotoki File	Liv	
2018	Darling in the Franxx	007	
2018	Release the Spyce	Bunchō no Onna	
2018	Tada Never Falls in Love	Cherry	
2018	Amanchu! Advance	Mato Katori	
2018	Cutie Honey Universe	Tomahawk Panther	
2018	High Score Girl	Moemi Gōda	
2018	Skull-face Bookseller Honda-san	Okitsune	
2019	Date A Live III	Ellen Mira Mathers	
2019	Magical Girl Spec-Ops Asuka	Crescent Moon Sandino	
2019	Fairy Gone	Sophie	
2019	Million Arthur	Loletta	
2019	7 Seeds	Fujiko Amacha	
2019	Food Wars! Shokugeki no Soma: The Fourth Plate	Rindou Kobayashi	
2019	The Ones Within	Misery	
2019	The Case Files of Lord El-Melloi II: Rail Zeppelin Grace Note	Luviagelita Edelfelt	
2020	Plunderer	Nana Bassler	
2020	Sorcerous Stabber Orphen	Letitia MacCredy	
2020	Healin' Good Pretty Cure	Shindoine	
2020	Tower of God	Black March	
2020	Super HxEros	Hakkouchuu	
2020	Wandering Witch: The Journey of Elaina	Niké	
2021	Hortensia Saga	Marie	
2021	High-Rise Invasion	Dealer Mask	ONA
2021–present	The Way of the Househusband	Miku	ONA
2021	The Idaten Deities Know Only Peace	Gil	
2021	Tesla Note	Lily Steinem	
2022	Requiem of the Rose King	Queen Elizabeth	
2022	Girls' Frontline	Executioner	
2022	Date A Live IV	Ellen Mira Mathers	
2022	Princess Connect! Re:Dive Season 2	Io	
2022	I'm Quitting Heroing	Steina	
2022	Tomodachi Game	Tsukino	
2022	Bastard!! -Heavy Metal, Dark Fantasy-	Kai Harn	ONA
2022	Call of the Night	Kabura Honda	
2022	Parallel World Pharmacy	Queen Elisabeth II	
2023	The Tale of the Outcasts	Lucia	
2023	Buddy Daddies	Yuzuko Kurusu	
2023	Oshi no Ko	Yoriko Kichijouji	
2023	Jujutsu Kaisen	Manami Suda	
2023	Yuri Is My Job!	Youko Goeidou	
2023	The Eminence in Shadow 2nd Season	Yukime	
2024	'Tis Time for "Torture," Princess	Torture Tortura	
2024	Chillin' in Another World with Level 2 Super Cheat Powers	Damalynas	
2024	The Strongest Magician in the Demon Lord's Army Was a Human	Cefiro	
2024	Suicide Squad Isekai	Enchantress	
2024	Sengoku Youko	Hanatora	
2024	How I Attended an All-Guy's Mixer	Hagi's older sister	
2024	Demon Lord 2099	Kinohara	
2025	I Have a Crush at Work	Shizuno Hayakawa	
2025	I'm a Noble on the Brink of Ruin, So I Might as Well Try Mastering Magic	Scarlet	
2025	Once Upon a Witch's Death	Inori	
2025	Kamitsubaki City Under Construction	Reconstruction Manager	
2026	An Adventurer's Daily Grind at Age 29	Veronica	
2026	Playing Death Games to Put Food on the Table	Hakushi	
2026	Akane-banashi	Masaki Ōsaki	
2026	The Strongest Job Is Apparently Not a Hero or a Sage, but an Appraiser (Provisional)!	Emalia	
2026	I Made Friends with the Second Prettiest Girl in My Class	Sora Asanagi	
2026	Yu-Gi-Oh! Card Game The Chronicles	Azamina	

=== Original video animation (OVA) ===
- Baldr Force Exe Resolution – Kaira Kirusten
- D-Frag! – Takao
- Dogs: Bullets & Carnage – Naoto Fuyumine
- Top wo Nerae 2! – Pacica Peska Pelcicum
- I"s Pure – Iori Yoshizuki
- Maria-sama ga Miteru 3rd Season – Rei Hasekura
- Negima!? – Misa Kakizaki
- Pinky:St – Noriko, woman 1
- Shakugan no Shana SP: Koi to Onsen no Kōgai Gakushū! – Wilhelmina Carmel
- To Heart 2 – Tamaki Kosaka
- xxxHOLiC: Shunmuki – Himawari Kunogi
- Sky Girls (2006) – Eika Ichijō
- Shirobako (2015) – Aya, Catherine Weller
- Amanchu!: Yakusoku no Natsu to Atarashii Omoide no Koto (2017) – Mato Katori
- Food Wars!: Shokugeki no Soma (2017) – Rindō Kobayashi

=== Film animation ===
Year	Film	Role	Note
2005	xxxHolic: A Midsummer Night's Dream	Himawari Kunogi	
2010	Detective Conan: The Lost Ship in the Sky	Waitress	
2010	Book Girl	Maki Himekura	
2010	HeartCatch PreCure! the Movie: Fashion Show in the Flower Capital... Really?!	Momoka Kurumi	
2011	Hayate no Gotoku Heaven is a place on Earth	Hinagiku Katsura	
2011	Mahou Sensei Negima! Anime Final	Misa Kakizaki	
2011	Hayate no Gotoku Heaven is a place on Earth	Hinagiku Katsura	
2015	Psycho-Pass: The Movie	Yayoi Kunizuka	
2015	Crayon Shin-chan: My Moving Story! Cactus Large Attack!	Oohara Nanako	
2016	Shimajiro in Bookland	Voice	
2017	Lu Over the Wall	Isaki	
2017	Haikara-San: Here Comes Miss Modern Part 1	Kichiji	
2019	Trinity Seven: Heavens Library & Crimson Lord	Judecca	
2020	BEM: Become Human	Greta	
2020	Crayon Shin-chan: Crash! Rakuga Kingdom and Almost Four Heroes	Nanako	
2021	Pretty Guardian Sailor Moon Eternal The Movie	Minako Aino/Super Sailor Venus	2-Part film, Season 4 of Sailor Moon Crystal (Dead Moon arc)
2021	Jujutsu Kaisen 0	Manami Suda	
2022	Mobile Suit Gundam: Cucuruz Doan's Island	Selma Levens	
2022	Laid-Back Camp Movie	Minami Toba	
2023	Pretty Guardian Sailor Moon Cosmos The Movie	Minako Aino/Eternal Sailor Venus	2-Part film, Season 5 of Sailor Moon Crystal (Shadow Galactica arc)
2025	Whoever Steals This Book	Keiko Yosano	
2026	Sekiro: No Defeat	Emma	

=== Drama CDs ===
- Asobi ni iku yo! (Durel)
- Cyborg 009 Drama Album: Love Stories (Nana Kashima)
- D-Frag! (Takao)
- Dogs: Bullets & Carnage (Naoto Fuyumine)
- Hayate X Blade (Inori Sae)
- Houkago Play (Kanojo)

=== Video games ===
- Samurai Shodown V Special (2004) (Mizuki Rashojin)
- Fate/unlimited Codes (2008) (Luviagelita Edelfelt)
- Tales of Hearts (2008) (Innes Lorenz)
- Bloodborne (2015) (Vicar Amelia)
- Girls' Frontline (KSG, Executioner) (2016)
- Overwatch (2016) (Widowmaker)
- Nioh (2017) (Tachibana Ginchiyo)
- Another Eden (2017) (Shanie)
- Final Fantasy XIV: Stormblood (2017) (Yotsuyu)
- Azur Lane (2018) (IJN Mogami, RN Littorio, MNF Algérie)
- Sekiro: Shadows Die Twice (2019) (Emma)
- Fire Emblem: Three Houses (2019) (Byleth (female))
- The King of Fighters All Star (2019) (Pretty Billy, Elisabeth Blanctorche)
- Arknights (2019) (Schwarz)
- Punishing: Gray Raven (2019) (Ayla)
- The Seven Deadly Sins: Grand Cross (2019) (Eastin Amabyllis)
- Fate/Grand Order (2019) (Astraea)
- Extraordinary Ones (2019) (Japanese Minnie announcements voice)
- Princess Connect! Re:Dive (2020) (Io)
- Guardian Tales (2020) Movie Star Eugene
- Super Smash Bros. Ultimate (2020) (Byleth (Female))
- Fire Emblem Heroes (2020) (Byleth (Female), Rickard)
- Touhou Spell Bubble (2020) (Yukari Yakumo)
- Ring Fit Adventure (2020) (Ring (Female))
- Fairy Tail (2020) (Flare Corona)
- The Sealed Ampoule (2021) (Irene)
- Monster Hunter Rise (2021) (Minoto)
- Kantai Collection (Saratoga, Asakaze, Matsukaze) (2013)
- Xenoblade Chronicles 2 (JP Dub Name: Kagutsuchi) (Brighid) (2017)
- Blue Archive (2021) (Shun Sunohara)
- The King of Fighters XV (2022) (Elisabeth Blanctorche)
- Counter:Side (2022) (Mansion Master)
- Bravely Default: Brilliant Lights (2022) (Sandra Cassandra)
- Return to Shironagasu Island (2022) (Gisele Reed)
- Witch on the Holy Night (2022) (Ritsuka Suse)
- Path to Nowhere (2022) (Eirene)
- Honkai: Star Rail (2023) (Kafka)
- Master Detective Archives: Rain Code (2023) (Martina Electro)
- Silent Hill 2 (2024) (Mary Shepherd-Sunderland, Maria)
- Reverse Collapse: Code Name Bakery (2024) (Atena Bryan)
- Shuten Order (2025) (Manji Fushicho, Kagura Fushicho)
- Wuthering Waves (2026 / 2027) (Lucilla)
- Neverness to Everness (2026) (Hotori)
- Nekopara: Sekai Connect (2026) (Lamud)

==== Unknown date ====
- Granblue Fantasy (Sutera, Korwa & Hekate)
- Gadget Trial (Nei)
- Jokyou Kaishi! (Keiko Yada)
- To Heart 2 (Tamaki Kosaka)
- Mabino Kakeru Star (Hinano Katase)
- Otomedius (Esmeralda)
- Gensosuikoden IV (Mizuki)
- Chaos Rings Omega (Cyllis)
- Mahou Sensei Negima! 1-Jikanme -Okochama Sensei wa Mahou Tsukai (Misa Kakizaki)
- Mahou Sensei Negima! 2-Jikanme Tatakau Otome-tachi! Mahora Dai Undoukai SP! (Misa Kakizaki)
- Tenkuu Danzai Skelter+Heaven (Midori Matsumura)
- Duel Savior Destiny (Kaede Hiiragi)
- Zoids Infinity EX NEO (Kotona Elegance)
- Dokapon The World
- EVE～new generation～ (Efi)
- Rockman ZX (Pandora)
- Gunparade Orchestra Midori no Shou ~ Ookami to Kare no Shōnen ~ (牧原輝春)
- Yoake Mae Yori Ruri Iro Na: Brighter than dawning blue (Wreathlit Noel)
- WILD ARMS the Vth Vanguard (Avril van Frulu)
- Metroid: Other M (MB / Melissa Bergman)
- Muv-Luv Alternative (Touko Kazama)
- Katahane (Dua Carlstedt)
- Luminous Arc (Vanessa)
- Drakengard 3 (Five)
- Routes (Lisa Vixen)
- Zack & Wiki: Quest for Barbaros' Treasure (Rock Rose)
- Amagami (Haruka Morishima)
- Hayate no Gotoku! Nightmare Paradise (Hinagiku Katsura)
- Rune Factory 3 (Karin)
- Shining Force Feather (Alfin)
- Abyss of the Sacrifice (Oruga)
- Twinkle Crusaders (Kujoh Helena)
- Trauma Team (JP version name: HOSPITAL) (Tomoe Tachibana)
- Gloria Union (Elisha, Kyra)
- Granado Espada (Emilia Giannino, Emilia the Sage, & Reckless Emilia)
- Skylanders: Spyro's Adventure (Cali)
- Skylanders: Giants (Cali)
- League of Legends (Lux)
- Sword Art Online: Hollow Realization (Kizmel)

=== Radio ===
- To Heart 2 (Tamaki Kosaka)

=== Comic ===
- Beelzebub (Hildagarde)
- Cloth Road (Jennifer)
- World's End Harem (Mira Suou)

=== Dubbing ===
==== Live-action ====
Title	Role	Dubbing credit	Other
The Current War	Marguerite Erskine Walker	Katherine Waterston	
Extinction	Anne	Clara Lago	
Fantastic Beasts and Where to Find Them	Porpentina "Tina" Goldstein	Katherine Waterston	
Fantastic Beasts: The Crimes of Grindelwald	Porpentina "Tina" Goldstein	Katherine Waterston	
Fantastic Beasts: The Secrets of Dumbledore	Porpentina "Tina" Goldstein	Katherine Waterston	
The Flight Attendant	Cassie Bowden	Kaley Cuoco	
The Great Wall	Commander Lin Mae	Jing Tian	
Ingrid Goes West	Taylor Sloane	Elizabeth Olsen	
Kong: Skull Island	San Lin	Jing Tian	
Lovecraft Country	Christina Braithwhite	Abbey Lee	
Slumdog Millionaire	Latika	Freida Pinto	
They Found Hell	Ava		
Vanguard	Mi Ya	Miya Muqi	
Vincent N Roxxy	Kate	Zoey Deutch	
Zombieland	Little Rock	Abigail Breslin	

==== Animation ====
Title	Role	Other
The Dark Crystal: Age of Resistance	Brea	
Ratchet & Clank	Cora Veralux	
The Cuphead Show!	Baroness Von Bon Bon	
Raya and the Last Dragon	Namaari	

== Discography ==
=== Albums ===
Year	Single details	Catalog No.	Peak Oricon chart positions
2013	Feeling Life: Released: April 17, 2013; Label: Lantis; Format: CD	LACA-15289	91

=== EP ===
Year	Single details	Catalog No.	Peak Oricon chart positions
2010	Devotion: Released: April 21, 2010; Label: Lantis; Format: CD	LHCA-5118	54
2011	Present: Released: February 23, 2011; Label: Lantis; Format: CD	LHCA-5125	66

=== Singles ===
Year	Single details	Catalog No.	Peak Oricon chart positions
2011	Everybody Ready Now?: Released: December 7, 2011; Label: Lantis; Format: CD	LASM-4126	118
2012	"Kimi no Iru Basho" (君のいる場所): Released: December 26, 2012; Label: Lantis; Format: CD	LACM-14046	100
