= Hayate the Combat Butler! Heaven Is a Place on Earth =

2011 Japanese anime film

- Advertising poster

Japanese name
- Kanji: ハヤテのごとく! HEAVEN IS A PLACE ON EARTH
Transcriptions
- Revised Hepburn: Hayate no Gotoku! HEAVEN IS A PLACE ON EARTH
- Directed by: Hideto Komori
- Screenplay by: Yasuko Kobayashi
- Story by: Kenjiro Hata (original manga)
- Produced by: Akio Matsuda; Takeyuki Suzuki
- Starring: Ryōko Shiraishi; Rie Kugimiya; Rie Tanaka; Shizuka Itou; Mikako Takahashi
- Cinematography: Ryō Iijima
- Edited by: JAYFILM; Tomoki Nagasaka
- Music by: Wataru Maeguchi
- Production company: Manglobe
- Distributed by: King Records; T-JOY
- Release date: August 27, 2011
- Running time: 70 minutes
- Country: Japan
- Language: Japanese

Hayate the Combat Butler! Heaven Is a Place on Earth (劇場版 ハヤテのごとく! HEAVEN IS A PLACE ON EARTH) is a 2011 Japanese animated film in the Hayate the Combat Butler anime and manga franchise. The film was released in theaters on August 27, 2011, as a double-bill with Mahou Sensei Negima! Anime Final. The film was licensed for streaming and home video release by Sentai Filmworks in August 2015.

== Plot ==
Hayate, Nagi, and the gang spend the last days of summer break at Nishizawa's countryside vacation home. But a mysterious spirit (Suzune Ayasaki—Hayate's grandmother) has concocted a scheme to separate the butler from his young mistress in a closed-space amusement park that Hayate used to visit when he was young.
