= List of Zettai Karen Children episodes =

This is a list of episodes of the 2008 animated television series Zettai Karen Children (絶対可憐チルドレン). The anime is based on the manga of the same name, and is produced by SynergySP. It began on April 6, 2008, on TV Tokyo.

The anime has six pieces of theme music; two opening themes and four ending themes. The first opening theme is "Over The Future" by Karen Girl's, the first ending theme is "Zettai love×love Sengen!!" (絶対love×love宣言!!) by "The Children starring Aya Hirano, Ryoko Shiraishi and Haruka Tomatsu"; the second ending theme is "Datte Daihonmei" (DATTE大本命), also by Hirano, Shiraishi, and Tomatsu. From episode 27 onwards opening theme has changed to "MY WINGS", once again by Karen Girl's, ending theme changed to "Break+Your+Destiny" by Yuuichi Nakamura, Kishō Taniyama and Kōji Yusa and "Soushunfu" performed by Aya Hirano, Ryoko Shiraishi and Haruka Tomatsu. In episode 46 of the series, the opening theme, "MY WINGS", was sung by Aya Hirano, Ryoko Shiraishi and Haruka Tomatsu while the ending theme was "Zettai love×love Sengen!!", sung by Karen Girl's. The series has been licensed by Sentai Filmworks and was released under the title Psychic Squad on North America in 2012.

== Episode list ==
No.	Title	Original release date
1	"Absolute Lovely! Their Name is The Children"; Transliteration: "Zettai Karen! Sono Na wa Za Chirudoren" (Japanese: 絶対可憐! その名はザ·チルドレン)	April 6, 2008
Kaoru Akashi (a psychokinetic), Aoi Nogami (a teleporter), and Shiho Sannomiya (capable of psychometry) are three Level 7 ten-year-old espers also known as "The Children", a special task force assembled by the Base of Backing ESP Laboratory (B.A.B.E.L.), pursue a dangerous esper criminal assisted by Kōichi Minamoto, unaware that he was chosen to become their new field leader.
2	"Worry Not! The Tower of B.A.B.E.L. Soars"; Transliteration: "Kōchinmuyū! Baberu no Tō wa Sobietatsu" (Japanese: 高枕無憂! バベルの塔はそびえたつ)	April 13, 2008
Minamoto has trouble in coordinating the new team under his management and risks his life to save Kaoru, whose powers go out of control after an examination.
3	"A Virtuous Person! Being an Esper is Tough"; Transliteration: "Akubokutōsen! Esupā wa Tsurai yo" (Japanese: 悪木盗泉! エスパーはつらいよ)	April 20, 2008
Minamoto moves into his new apartment, unaware that The Children convinced their superiors to let them live with him. After having a serious discussion with him, they get accidentally involved in a hostage situation where the criminal, an esper like them, try to convince the girls to join his side, but they decline and help apprehend the criminal. Afterwards, Minamoto decides to let The Children stay at his apartment.
4	"Beautiful Spring Scenery! Go Go Pretty High-School Girl"; Transliteration: "Ryūankamei! Ike Ike Puritī Joshikōsei" (Japanese: 柳暗花明! いけいけ♥プリティ女子高生)	April 27, 2008
Naomi Umegae, a Level 6 psychokinetic otherwise known as "Wild Cat", is having trouble controlling her powers while out in the field, and her field leader Ichirō Tanizaki asks the help of Minamoto and The Children to find out why. After some investigation, The Children figure out the reason for it and come with an unusual method to help her vent out her hidden resentment toward Tanizaki.
5	"Beware Unpreparedness! You Wouldn't Normally Enter, Would You?"; Transliteration: "Yudantaiteki! Futsū Haitte Konai yo ne" (Japanese: 油断大敵! フツー入ってこないよね)	May 4, 2008
During an experiment to help The Children learn to properly behave at school, the B.A.B.E.L headquarters is attacked by the "Normal People", an anti-esper organization.
6	"I'll Buy That Fight! Right Before Our Classmates...!?"; Transliteration: "Kenka Jōtō! Kurasumeito no Me no Mae de...!?" (Japanese: 喧嘩上等! クラスメイトの目の前で...!?)	May 11, 2008
The Children finally get to attend their first day of classes, but worried if they can uphold their promise to not use their powers at school, Minamoto dons an optical camouflage suit to keep a close watch on their actions.
7	"Very Ordinary! Restricted Children"; Transliteration: "Heiheibonbon! Shibarareta Chirudoren" (Japanese: 平々凡々! しばられたチルドレン)	May 18, 2008
After a test with a new Esper Counter Measure (ECM) device which can block psychic abilities, the Normal People make use of it to capture The Children and Minamoto. Minamoto manages to deceive their captors, activating a special device that counters the effects of the ECM and Kaoru takes the opportunity to fight back.
8	"Hyōbu Kyōsuke! What, He Showed Up?"; Transliteration: "Hyōbu Kyōsuke! A, Dechatta no?" (Japanese: 兵部京介! あ, 出ちゃったの?)	May 25, 2008
Kyōsuke Hyōbu, a powerful esper criminal much older than he looks, briefly appears before The Children and at B.A.B.E.L. which brings the chief and Minamoto to go to the maximum security prison for espers where he should be, just to find that he was not restrained at all and could easily leave his cell and return undetected. Soon a rebellion breaks out at the prison and The Children confront the inmates to prevent them from escaping.
9	"Attractive Bodies! We Are Adults!?"; Transliteration: "Yōshitanrei! Atashitachi ga Otona ni!?" (Japanese: 容姿端麗! あたしたちがオトナに!?)	June 1, 2008
Kyōsuke appears before Minamoto and uses his powers on him to make him see The Children as their adult selves. Learning of the situation, the girls decide to take advantage of it to get back at him for always treating them as mere kids.
10	"Danger Awaits! Hurry, B.A.B.E.L. 2!!"; Transliteration: "Fuchū-no-Uo! Isoge Baberu 2!!" (Japanese: 釜中之魚! いそげバベル2!!)	June 8, 2008
During a special mission to rescue the survivors of a sunken ship, Minamoto and Kaoru are left behind by themselves when Minamoto is put under Kyōsuke's hypnotic suggestion once more. When Kaoru gets herself in critical condition for using her powers for too long, Kyōsuke appears before Minamoto offering him aid, with the intention of putting him permanently under his control.
11	"Open Air Hot Springs! Eyes Glint in the Steam"; Transliteration: "Rotenburo! Yukemuri ni Hikaru Me" (Japanese: 露天風呂! 湯けむりに光る目)	June 15, 2008
The B.A.B.E.L. staff have a company vacation at an outside onsen retreat in the mountains, and everything is running smoothly until they end up joining two special esper agents from Comerica to apprehend a duo of criminals infiltrated there.
12	"The Long Road Ahead! Teleporting Japan's Future!!"; Transliteration: "Zentoryōen! Nihon no Mirai o Terepōto!!" (Japanese: 前途遼遠! 日本の未来をテレポート!!)	June 22, 2008
Minamoto and Aoi are tasked to make a special delivery overseas to the Prime Minister of Japan. On their way they are attacked by foreign hostiles who mistake them for spies, until Minamoto realizes that it is all a scheme by a real spy who wants to stop them.
13	"Family Disruption? Operation Paradise!!"; Transliteration: "Katei Hōkai? Gokuraku Daisakusen!!" (Japanese: 家庭崩壊? ゴクラク大作戦!!)	June 29, 2008
Minamoto must deal with Kaoru's strained relationship with her mother and sister as she believes they neglected her out of fear of her psychic powers.
14	"Have a Sharp Mind!? The Children are Bumbling/Master Detectives"; Transliteration: "Zunōmeiseki!? Chirudoren wa Meitantei" (Japanese: 頭脳明晰!? チルドレンはメイ探偵)	July 6, 2008
The police asks for Shiho's help with their investigations but Minamoto stands against it out of concern about her normal development, confronting even her father who happens to be the National Police Agency director, but both Minamoto and the director set aside their differences when Shiho finds herself at the mercy of a dangerous criminal.
15	"Rock-ribbed Law! Don't Escape!!"; Transliteration: "Kinkagyokujō! Nigecha Dame!!" (Japanese: 金科玉条! 逃げちゃダメ!!)	July 13, 2008
Upon news that Colonel J.D. Grisham from Comerica defects, B.A.B.E.L. teams up with Ken and Mary once more to confront him.
16	"Gentleman's Agreement! The Memory of the Far-off Days..."; Transliteration: "Ichidakusenkin! Tōi Hi no Omoide..." (Japanese: 一諾千金! 遠い日の思い出...)	July 20, 2008
The confront with Colonel Grisham continues, until the others learn the true motive behind his actions and join his effort to fulfill the desire of a dear old friend of his.
17	"Survival of the Fittest! I'm Gonna Eat You♪"; Transliteration: "Jakunikukyōshoku! Tabechau zo♪" (Japanese: 弱肉強食! 食べちゃうゾ♪)	July 27, 2008
Minamoto is tasked to assist level 4 metamorph Hatsune and the Level 4 metempsychosist Akira with their training to pass the exam to become members of B.A.B.E.L. However, The Children start feeling neglected by him and challenge the trio to confront them in a special exercise.
18	"Deep Love Detection! The Children in Danger of Dissolution!"; Transliteration: "Netsuai Hakkaku! Chirudoren Kaisan no Kiki!" (Japanese: 熱愛発覚! チルドレン解散の危機!)	August 3, 2008
Kaoru feels herself left out when Aoi and Shiho start dating two good-looking boys with similar interests as them. After failing to set the other girls apart from the boys, she reminisces back to the day when she first met them and is invited by Minamoto to spend some quality time with him.
19	"Runaway Angel! It Couldn't Happen to My Naomi...!"; Transliteration: "Bōsō Tenshi! Uchi no Naomi ni Kagitte...!" (Japanese: 暴走天使! ウチのナオミにかぎって･･･!)	August 10, 2008
Fed up with Ichirō's antics, Naomi flees by herself and ends up befriending a gang of bikers while Ichiro convinces Minamoto and The Children to help him make amends with her.
20	"Super Beast Caricature! Sometimes Come to Be a Beast..."; Transliteration: "Chōjūgiga! Toki ni wa Kedamono no yō ni..." (Japanese: 超獣戯画! 時にはケダモノのように･･･)	August 17, 2008
Kyōsuke's partner, the flying squirrel Momotarō suffers an accident and is found unconscious by Kaoru who back to health at home. Meanwhile, Minamoto discovers more about Momotarō's past, including the harsh experiments made on his body.
21	"Jack-of-All-Trades and Master Of None! Why Was He Angry!?"; Transliteration: "Kiyōbinbō! Kare wa Nande Okottaka!?" (Japanese: 器用貧乏! 彼は何で怒ったか!?)	August 24, 2008
Kyōsuke decides to have his spy at B.A.B.E.L., Takashi Kugutsu to find more information about Oboro. However, Kugutsu is discovered by Kaoru, who takes advantage of the situation to have him take part in a dubious project of hers.
22	"Nature Over Nurture! Minamoto Gunned Down!?"; Transliteration: "Mōbosansen! Minamoto, Kyōdan ni Chiru!?" (Japanese: 孟母三遷! 皆本, 凶弾に散る!?)	August 31, 2008
Minamoto best friend and fellow B.A.B.E.L. operative Dr. Sakaki is being suspected of being a spy. Believing in his innocence, Minamoto makes his own investigation to clear his name, just to find that it is all a scheme orchestrated by the real spy, Kugutsu, who holds a grudge against him.
23	"All at Once! We've Been Robbed...!"; Transliteration: "Kyūtenchokka! Ubawarechatta...!" (Japanese: 急転直下! 奪われちゃった...!)	September 7, 2008
Kyōsuke assembles his secret organization P.A.N.D.R.A. and one of their members, a young teleporter named Mio challenges Kaoru out of jealousy upon Kyōsuke's obsession with her.
24	"Professional Homemaker! They've Been Washed...!"; Transliteration: "Sengyōshufu! Arawarechatta...!" (Japanese: 専業主夫! 洗われちゃった...!)	September 14, 2008
Mio and her companion kidnap Minamoto to lure The Children and Sakaki to a trap, But when they finally reach the enemies' hideout, Kaoru and the others find much to their surprise that Minamoto is behaving less like a prisoner and more like a housekeeper taking care of them.
25	"May the Birth Go Well! Hello Baby!"; Transliteration: "Anzan Kigan! Konnichiwa, Akachan" (Japanese: 安産祈願! こんにちわ, 赤ちゃん)	September 21, 2008
The Children join a mission to rescue the victims of a landslide. With their mission almost done, they get themselves in trouble to save a pregnant woman when her baby's esper powers interferes with their own.
26	"Change the Prediction? The Future Dances!"; Transliteration: "Yochi Kaihen? Mirai wa Odoru!" (Japanese: 予知改変? 未来は踊る!)	September 28, 2008
Minamoto and The Children are tasked to protect Lieutenant Ikyuugo, a dolphin and a level 7 precognitor who has predicted his own death. Struggling to prevent Ikyuugo's prediction to come true, Minamoto has a shocking revelation when the Lieutenant shares with him an even more ominous forecast about him and Kaoru.
27	"Declaration of War! A Challenge from P.A.N.D.R.A."; Transliteration: "Sensenfukoku! Pandora kara no Chōsenjō" (Japanese: 宣戦布告! パンドラからの挑戦状)	October 5, 2008
A pair of sibling espers with electromagnetic powers are hijacking TV broadcasts to spread P.A.N.D.R.A. propaganda while mocking The Children. While confronting the criminals, Minamoto and the girls receive aid from a mysterious figure who contacts their chief giving them instructions to fight back.
28	"Beauty of Feature! Tsubomi Kiss Alert"; Transliteration: "Shūgetsuheika! Tsubomi Chūihō" (Japanese: 羞月閉花! 蕾見チュー意報)	October 12, 2008
Taizou and Oboro introduce Minamoto to Fujiko Tsubomi, the true leader of B.A.B.E.L who was sleeping in her private chambers for ten years before recently awakening.
29	"Finesse of Love! The Sea Which is the Nearest to Heaven"; Transliteration: "Terentekuda! Tengoku ni Ichiban Chikai Umi" (Japanese: 手練手管! 天国に一番近い海)	October 19, 2008
Fed up with all the trouble Kaoru and the others cause to him, Minamoto resigns from being their guardian. Fujiko convinces Minamoto to give her one last chance to dissuade him in exchange for info about the prediction about him and Kaoru, and she takes him to a remote facility of hers. With doubts about her true intentions, The Children follow them soon after.
30	"Woes Unite Foes! Do Safeblowing by Design♥"; Transliteration: "Goetsudōshū! Kinko Yaburi wa Keikakuteki ni♥" (Japanese: 呉越同舟! 金庫破りは計画的に♥)	October 26, 2008
After learning about the unsolved probability case file #666, that measures the possibility of The Children become villains or not in the future, Minamoto and the girls end up trapped in an esper-proof safe along Muscle and Mio. Upon learning that they had fallen in a trap set by the Normal People, Minamoto makes use of his ingenuity to have Kaoru and the others activate their limiters' newest feature, the "Triple Boost", that allows them to combine their powers to increase the ability of one of them allowing them to escape.
31	"World Heritage! Then, Shall We Go to Kyoto?!"; Transliteration: "Sekai Isan! Hona, Kyōto ni Ikoka!" (Japanese: 世界遺産! ほな, 京都に行こか!)	November 2, 2008
Aoi, Minamoto and Ken take part in a special mission in Kyoto to protect the city's World Heritage Sites from a Comerican esper vandal. As Kyoto is also Aoi's hometown, she takes the opportunity to introduce Minamoto to her family and tries to spend some quality time with him.
32	"Rare delicacies! Touch Me If You Can"; Transliteration: "Chinmikakō! Tatchi Mī Ifu Yū Kyan" (Japanese: 珍味佳肴! タッチ·ミー·イフ·ユー·キャン)	November 9, 2008
With Minamoto away at Kyoto with Aoi, Sakaki stays at his place taking care of Kaoru and Shiho in his absence, but he has some trouble dealing with them.
33	"Autumn Holiday-making! Lunchbox is in the Underbush"; Transliteration: "Aki no Kōraku! Ranchi Bokkusu wa Yabu no Naka" (Japanese: 秋之行楽! ランチボックスは藪の中)	November 16, 2008
The Children have a school field trip with their classmates Touno and Chisato at the mountains. Mio, Momotarō and Muscle are also at the area under P.A.N.D.R.A.'s orders and trouble ensues when they encounter the girls.
34	"From Flies to Mosquitoes Everywhere! Minamoto is Using His Hands and Legs too!?" Transliteration: "Chōyōbobun! Minamoto ga Te o Suru Ashi o Suru!?" (Japanese: 朝蠅暮蚊! 皆本が手をする足をする!?)	November 23, 2008
Minamoto and The Children are deployed to contain a swarm of flies under control of a rogue esper. When Minamoto falls under the flies' control, The children force Kyousuke to help them subdue the criminal and save him.
35	"Much Dramas and Hates! Hatsune Runs Away from Home!"; Transliteration: "Tajōtakon! Hatsune no Iede" (Japanese: 多情多恨! 初音の家出)	November 30, 2008
Hatsune is having trouble in accepting her new supervisor, Keiko and runs away from home, taking shelter at Minamoto's house. Not liking the idea of having another esper child to deal with, he comes with a plan to have Hatsune getting used to Keiko which goes wrong when the two find themselves stranded in the North Pole.
36	"Guys Prohibited! Afternoon of the Angels"; Transliteration: "Danshi Kinsei! Tenshi-tachi no Gogo" (Japanese: 男子禁制! 天使たちの午後)	December 7, 2008
The Children are summoned by Tanizaki to investigate the sudden closeness between Naomi and her art teacher Ruriko. Upon discovering the reason, they join forces with her to find out the identity of the mysterious esper who is tormenting Ruriko with his powers.
37	"Formidable Enemy Shows Up! Black Phantom"; Transliteration: "Kyōteki Raishū! Burakku Fantomu" (Japanese: 強敵来襲! ブラック·ファントム)	December 14, 2008
A foreign political leader, targeted by the mysterious organization "Black Phantom" is saved by the members of P.A.N.D.R.A. and The Children confront the enemy sniper, a youngster named "Bullet Silver" just to find that he was brainwashed and any attempt to bring him back his senses may lead to is death, until Kaoru manages to make use of the trio's combined energy to save him with her newest power, the "Psychic Force of Absolution".
38	"Transient Life! Dream Maker"; Transliteration: "Kochō-no-Yume! Dorīmu Meikā" (Japanese: 胡蝶之夢! ドリームメイカー)	December 21, 2008
As Bullet and Kaoru are examined by Sakaki regarding the events of the last fight, Fujiko tries to convince Minamoto to comply with her orders to carry with him the newest weapon designed to kill enemy espers designed by B.A.B.E.L., as he knows that he is destined to, in the near future, use it to kill Kaoru. Soon after, Minamoto receives a mysterious package sent by Hyōbu that puts him on stasis, reliving the contents of Ikyuugo's final prediction.
39	"Evanescence! Psycho-Divers"; Transliteration: "Mugenhōyō! Saiko-Daibāzu" (Japanese: 夢幻泡影! サイコダイバーズ)	December 28, 2008
Kaoru dives into Minamoto's consciousness in an attempt to bring him back to reality, while the others look for a way to force Hyōbu to free him.
sp.	"Generous Treatment! Natsuko and Hotaru's B.A.B.E.L. Report"; Transliteration: "Ōbanburumai! Natsuko to Hotaru no Baberu Tsūshin" (Japanese: 大盤振舞! 奈津子とほたるのバベル通信)	January 4, 2009
40	"Tsubomi Lodge! Go In!"; Transliteration: "Tsubomi Sansō! Totsunyū Seyo!" (Japanese: 蕾見山荘! 突入せよ!)	January 11, 2009
Fujiko invites her subordinates for a break at her mountain villa. With all reunited for dinner, Sakaki reveals to the others details about some woman of Minamoto's past and it prompts the girls to discover more about it, but their meddling in Minamoto's personal affairs turns to worse when they are forced to remember how dangerous he can be when he snaps.
41	"Marital Vows! His Majesty and The Children"; Transliteration: "Hiyokurenri! Kokuō Heika no Chirudoren" (Japanese: 比翼連理! 国王陛下のチルドレン)	January 18, 2009
Fujiko brings Minamoto and The Children to the Kingdom of Impalahem, where they are tasked to assist Prince Badjura in freeing his lover Sera from being possessed by a spirit.
42	"Transformation Problem! Fantastic Toy"; Transliteration: "Gattai Mondai! Fantasutikku Toi" (Japanese: 合体問題! ファンタスティック·トイ)	January 25, 2009
As Kaoru is being further examined to measure possible damages from the continue use of the Triple Boost, her friends find themselves under attack by Tim Toy, another of Black Phantom's brainwashed minions.
43	"A Quirk of Fate! Caroline, Reunion of Fate"; Transliteration: "Aienkien! Kyarorain, Unmei no Saikai" (Japanese: 合縁奇縁! キャロライン, 運命の再会)	February 1, 2009
Caroline Magi, an old acquaintance of Minamoto's from Comerica, appears before him once more, much to Kaoru and the others' jealousy. As Minamoto realizes that she is currently being possessed by Carry, her childish alternate personality, members of Comerica's esper unit arrive to apprehend her, leaving him on a dilemma between protecting her and averting an international incident, and Fujiko threat/punishing the children.
44	"The Anguish of Parting From One's loved Ones! Carry, Eternal Separation"; Transliteration: "Aibetsuriku! Kyarī, Eien no Wakare" (Japanese: 愛別離苦! キャリー, 永遠の別れ)	February 8, 2009
As Carry drags Minamoto through a tour around Japan, Hyōbu intervenes trying to sway her to his side, giving the members of B.A.B.E.L. the perfect excuse to act on Minamoto and Carry's favour without further straining their relations with the Comerican government.
45	"The Natural Gift! Gift of Children"; Transliteration: "Tempushizen! Gifuto Obu Chirudoren" (Japanese: 天賦自然! ギフト·オブ·チルドレン)	February 15, 2009
Minamoto and The Children are tasked to assist Takashi Kawamura, a young and powerful esper whose father is engaged in anti-esper activity. As Minamoto tries to convince Takashi's father that he is not an abomination, the girls show him the advantages and responsibilities that come with his powers until they are forced to deal with an attack from the Normal People Organization.
46	"Suspicion Breeds Suspicion! The Notebook that Makes it Happen!"; Transliteration: "Ginshinnangi! Sonotōri ni Nari No Desu-chō" (Japanese: 疑心暗鬼! その通りになるのです帳)	February 22, 2009
Kaoru, Aoi and Shiho come across a mysterious notebook that can realize whatever wish is written on it, igniting a game of deceit and treason between them for its possession. The situation gets even more chaotic when Hyōbu decides to take advantage of it to amuse himself for a while. Note: This episode contains references to the anime Death Note.
47	"Summer's Day Dream! Tomorrow's Feelings!"; Transliteration: "Ichijōshunmu! Ashita no Omoide" (Japanese: 一場春夢! 明日の想い出)	March 1, 2009
Some years in the future, a fugitive Kaoru pays a visit to Minamoto's apartment when she approached by Aoi and Shiho with the intention to arrest her. As the trio discuss a way to prevent their ominous future to come true, back in the present, Minamoto is warned about the increase on the probability of The Children turn to evil according to their precogs' forecast.
48	"Power Struggle! An Invisible Threat!"; Transliteration: "Ririki Sōzen! Miezarukyōi" (Japanese: 理力騒然! 見えざる脅威)	March 8, 2009
After losing control of her powers during a mission, Kaoru takes a leave for rest when she is approached by some members from P.A.N.D.R.A. who want to make use of her "Force of Absolution" to free another powerful esper under Black Phantom's Control.
49	"Shifting and Changing. Huh, Minamoto is . . . ?"; Transliteration: "Uitenpen! E〜tsu, Minamoto Ga!?" (Japanese: 有為転変! えっ、皆本が!?)	March 15, 2009
Minamoto is knocked unconscious while chasing a dangerous esper criminal and Hyōbu takes the opportunity to have him regress to his 12-year-old former self. Kaoru, Aoi and Shiho are assigned to keep Minamoto company and take the opportunity to spend some quality time with him while the others look for a way to have him return to normal. In the next day, they find that P.A.N.D.R.A. had occupied the school and brainwashed everyone there to make them believe that the younger Minamoto is one of its students. As Minamoto spends the day happily with the girls, he wonders if he could remain in his current condition indefinitely.
50	"Hardest Struggle! Over the Future!"; Transliteration: "Ichiifuntō! Ōbā・Za・Fyūchā" (Japanese: 一意奮闘! オーバー・ザ・フューチャー)	March 22, 2009
Minamoto is tempted by Hyōbu who offers him a mean to remain permanently as a child and have the cheerful school life he never had with the girls. However, when the Phantom Daughter, a member of Black Phantom, launches an attack on Kaoru, Minamoto makes his decision.
51	"Cherry Blossom Festival. Well, See You Again!"; Transliteration: "Ōka Ranman! Jā Matane" (Japanese: 桜花爛漫! じゃあまたね)	March 29, 2009
The members of P.A.N.D.R.A. hijack a luxurious ocean liner and make of it their new base of operations after rescuing the captive espers imprisoned there. Some years later, the now teenagers Kaoru, Aoi and Shiho graduate from elementary school and soon after, they are sent on another mission wearing their new uniforms. Meanwhile, Yuri, a new student arrives at the girls' middle school, who is revealed to be the Phantom Daughter in disguise.
OVA	"Changing Love! Take Back the Stolen Future?"; Transliteration: "Aitazousei! Ubawareta Mirai?" (Japanese: 愛多憎生! 奪われた未来?)	July 16, 2010 (DVD only release)
The B.A.B.E.L. headquarters is attacked by surprise and much to his comrades' astonishment, Minamoto is the culprit. Upon realizing that he was actually brainwashed by the Phantom Daughter to become her loyal servant, The Children and P.A.N.D.R.A. join forces to confront her and bring Minamoto back to his senses.
