= Unlimited Psychic Squad =

Japanese anime series and its manga adaptation

- North American DVD cover

THE UNLIMITED 兵部京介 (The Unlimited Hyōbu Kyōsuke)
- Genre: Action; Supernatural
- Anime television series
- Directed by: Shishō Igarashi
- Written by: Shinichi Inotsume
- Music by: Kōtarō Nakagawa
- Studio: Manglobe
- Licensed by: NA: Sentai Filmworks
- Original network: TV Tokyo
- Original run: January 8, 2013 – March 26, 2013
- Episodes: 12
- Manga
- Written by: Rokurou Ogaki
- Published by: Shogakukan
- Magazine: Shōnen Sunday S
- Original run: March 25, 2013 – July 25, 2015
- Volumes: 6
- icon

Unlimited Psychic Squad, known in Japan as The Unlimited: Hyōbu Kyōsuke (THE UNLIMITED 兵部京介), is a Japanese anime series produced by Manglobe. It is a spin-off to the original Zettai Karen Children manga series, created by Takashi Shiina. A manga adaptation by Rokurou Ogaki was serialized in Shogakukan's Shōnen Sunday S from March 2013 to July 2015, with its chapters collected into six tankōbon volumes.

== Media ==
=== Anime ===
In September 2012, an anime project based on Zettai Karen Children was announced by Weekly Shōnen Sunday. It was later revealed that it would be an original spin-off series focused on the leader of the criminal organization P.A.N.D.R.A., Kyōsuke Hyōbu. The series was produced by Manglobe and ran for 12 episodes on TV Tokyo and other stations from January 7 to March 25, 2013. New additions to the cast include Nao Tōyama as Yūgiri and Junichi Suwabe as Andy Hinomiya while almost all characters from the first TV Series are voiced by the same actors from then. The series, while similar in setting and characters, is darker and more serious in plot and tone than the original Zettai Karen Children series.

The opening song is "Last Resolution" by Emblem of The Unlimited and has two versions, one in English and the other in Japanese. It also has eight ending songs: "Outlaws" by Eyelis, "Brightest Light" by Yuichi Nakamura and Kishō Taniyama, "Darkness Night" (another version of "Brightest Light) by Kōji Yusa & Junichi Suwabe, "Brand New Eden" by Kōji Yusa, "Advent" by Kōji Yusa, another arrangement of "Darkness Night", titled "Darkness Night (Hyōbu Arrange)", performed by Kōji Yusa and Junichi Suwabe, "Sora no Hate" (空の涯て; 'End of the Sky') by Eyelis, and a secondary arrangement of "Darkness Night" called "Darkness Night (Hinomiya Arrange)" performed by Kōji Yusa and Junichi Suwabe. An insert song, "Mirai Monogatari" (未来物語; 'Future Story'), performed by Nao Tōyama, was used in the final episode.

The series was streamed by Crunchyroll. In December 2014, Sentai Filmworks announced that it had licensed the series. It was released on DVD and Blu-ray in Japanese with English subtitles on April 21, 2015.

==== Episodes ====
No.	Title	Original release date (Note: TV Tokyo listed the series premiere on January 7 at 25:35, effectively January 8 at 1:35 a.m. JST.)
1	"Paranormal Jailbreak" (Schooler of Deadlock); Transliteration: "Chō Jo Datsugoku" (Japanese: 超常脱獄)	January 8, 2013
In an unnamed country, Hyōbu surrenders to the military and is confined in a specialized esper prison. There, he encounters Andy Hinomiya, a prisoner with no apparent abilities. After instigating a disturbance, both are placed in confinement, where Hyōbu recruits Andy by aiding their escape. During a meal, Hyōbu avoids a drugged stew by giving it to Andy, leaving him incapacitated during a subsequent fight. After collapsing, Andy awakens in an external surgical facility, where Hyōbu rescues him and reveals the prison's role in illegal esper experimentation. The two locate Yūgiri, a captive esper child, but are intercepted by the warden, who deploys a monstrous fusion of esper body parts against them. Hyōbu destroys it by deactivating his limiter, unleashing his full power. P.A.N.D.R.A. extracts Hyōbu, Andy, and Yūgiri, transporting them to their base aboard the ocean-liner Catastrophe. Though accepted into the group, Andy is later revealed to be an infiltrator as he secretly contacts his superiors.
2	"The Melody of Assassination" (Ghost of WW2); Transliteration: "Ansatsu no MERODĪ" (Japanese: 暗殺のメロディ)	January 15, 2013
One week after boarding P.A.N.D.R.A.'s ship Catastrophe, USEI investigator Hinomiya's ability to nullify ESP powers is revealed, causing nearby espers to experience headaches, dizziness, or toothaches. Magi distrusts him, both due to his history and their inability to read his mind. P.A.N.D.R.A. prepares to smuggle weapons for Carlo, a mafia boss and Hyōbu's World War II-era acquaintance. Though Hyōbu appears young, his longevity stems from ESP-aided regeneration. The mission is compromised when Carlo's mafia attacks P.A.N.D.R.A.. Hyōbu proceeds to meet Carlo alone, instructing Hinomiya to shoot on signal—a test Hinomiya fails. Hyōbu, having anticipated this, exposes Carlo as a robotic decoy and kills him. The real Carlo, a powerful esper, is swiftly overpowered by Hyōbu. Afterward, Hyōbu provides Hinomiya a limiter to reduce his anti-ESP effects, making him vulnerable to mental probing. Magi pressures Yūgiri to read Hinomiya's mind, but she refuses without Hyōbu's direct order. Concurrently, Minamoto and Sakaki arrive in the Principality of Monarch.
3	"Cleanliness and Pollution" (Queen Not a Princess); Transliteration: "Seiso to Odaku" (Japanese: 清楚と汚濁)	January 22, 2013
Minamoto and Sakaki attend a party hosted by Princess Sophie Grace of Monarch, bringing together international esper organizations. They encounter Hyōbu and P.A.N.D.R.A. members, who escape undetected after a brief confrontation. Soon after, Sophie disappears—later revealed to be under P.A.N.D.R.A.'s protection as part of a plan to thwart her assassination, orchestrated at Yūgiri's request. Sophie bonds with Yūgiri and ventures into the city with Andy as escort. Hyōbu employs mass hypnosis to disguise all women as the princess, misleading their pursuers into a trap. During their outing, Sophie and Yūgiri visit an abandoned orphanage, where Sophie recalls Yūgiri as a former orphan who vanished years prior. The assassination plot's leader confronts them, but Minamoto—having identified the culprit through stolen files—arrives with police. When the assailant shoots at Sophie, Andy intercepts the bullet, and Hyōbu disarms the attacker before his arrest. Though Sophie offers to adopt Yūgiri, the child chooses to remain with P.A.N.D.R.A., bidding the princess farewell.
4	"Absolute Domain" (Children Territory); Transliteration: "Zettai Ryōiki" (Japanese: 絶対領域)	January 29, 2013
Minamoto and Sakaki attend a party hosted by Princess Sophie Grace of Monarch, bringing together international esper organizations. They encounter Hyōbu and P.A.N.D.R.A. members, who escape undetected after a brief confrontation. Soon after, Sophie disappears—later revealed to be under P.A.N.D.R.A.'s protection as part of a plan to thwart her assassination, orchestrated at Yūgiri's request. Sophie bonds with Yūgiri and ventures into the city with Andy as escort. Hyōbu employs mass hypnosis to disguise all women as the princess, misleading their pursuers into a trap. During their outing, Sophie and Yūgiri visit an abandoned orphanage, where Sophie recalls Yūgiri as a former orphan who vanished years prior. The assassination plot's leader confronts them, but Minamoto—having identified the culprit through stolen files—arrives with police. When the assailant shoots at Sophie, Andy intercepts the bullet, and Hyōbu disarms the attacker before his arrest. Though Sophie offers to adopt Yūgiri, the child chooses to remain with P.A.N.D.R.A., bidding the princess farewell.
5	"Strangers" (Portrait of the Family); Transliteration: "Sutorenjāzu" (Japanese: ストレンジャーズ)	February 5, 2013
While Catastrophe undergoes repairs, Andy escorts Yūgiri after she is summoned back, accompanied by Magi, Momiji, and Yoh. Simultaneously, Hyōbu secretly enters a B.A.B.E.L. medical facility for undisclosed examinations. During a visit to an amusement park with Yūgiri, Andy is confronted by Minamoto and Fujiko, who expose his identity as a U.S. government infiltrator and request his cooperation in capturing P.A.N.D.R.A. Meanwhile, Sakaki observes Yūgiri, whose esper abilities manifest publicly when she aids a lost child. Rejected by the crowd, Yūgiri loses control of her powers, triggering a dangerous hypnotic trance contained only by Andy's intervention. P.A.N.D.R.A. members arrive shortly after to secure them. Later, aboard Catastrophe, Hyōbu conceals his medical results—revealing a terminal prognosis—during a birthday celebration held in his honor.
6	"Darkness, Run" (As True As a Lie); Transliteration: "Yami, hashiru" (Japanese: 闇、走る)	February 12, 2013
Andy receives orders from his U.S. government superiors to complete his mission, coinciding with Hyōbu's announcement of P.A.N.D.R.A.'s plan to steal a new U.S.-developed ECM device. Andy relays this intelligence to B.A.B.E.L., which prepares an ambush—excluding "The Children" despite Kaoru's objections. When Minamoto's team corners Hyōbu's group, Andy seizes the opportunity to infiltrate Catastrophe and extract its core defense system, "Ihachigo". Hyōbu pursues but is intercepted by Kaoru, who warns of a precognitive vision depicting Catastrophe's destruction. Despite physical deterioration, Hyōbu overwhelms Kaoru and confronts Andy at Ihachigo's chamber. Admitting he always knew Andy was a spy, Hyōbu declares his intent to execute him.
7	"ESP Unit, Part One" (Generation Zero Part I); Transliteration: "Chōnō Butai Zenpen" (Japanese: 超能部隊・前編)	February 19, 2013
In his youth, shortly after his father's death, Hyōbu relocates to Japan to live with Fujiko and her father. Captain Eiji Saotome recruits them for a new Japanese Army esper unit, emphasizing its defensive purpose despite parallels to Nazi Germany's Third Reich program. Fujiko initially declines, while Hyōbu hesitates due to his father's warning against becoming a weapon. Both eventually join. Months later, their involvement in a conflict with a naval officer prompts Army officials to consider disbanding the unit. Eiji negotiates a wager: the incident will be dismissed if the espers can defeat Japan's advanced Mitsubishi A6M Zero fighter in combat.
8	"ESP Unit, Part Two" (Generation Zero Part II); Transliteration: "Chōnō Butai Kōhen" (Japanese: 超能部隊・後編)	February 26, 2013
Eiji selects Hyōbu to face the navy's fighter pilot—the same officer involved in their earlier conflict—in a duel. Despite being haunted by his father's warnings against using his powers, Hyōbu overcomes his hesitation and wins by striking the cockpit with a paint round. Shortly afterward, the unit rescues two dolphins from a U.S. submarine attack after the animals telepathically plead for help. The surviving dolphins warn Hyōbu of a dark future. Years later, following the atomic bombing of Hiroshima, Eiji reveals Japan's impending surrender and the unit's near-total annihilation. Using the preserved brain of Ihachigo (one of the dolphins), Eiji experiences a precognition of Hyōbu causing global destruction. He attempts to execute Hyōbu, firing three shots—including one to the head—but Hyōbu survives and retaliates, apparently killing Eiji. Vowing revenge against "normals" for betraying his comrades, Hyōbu departs.
9	"Catastrophe" (Pandora's Box Opens); Transliteration: "Katasutorofu" (Japanese: カタストロフ)	March 5, 2013
Andy disables Ihachigo's cloaking system, revealing Catastrophe to U.S. military forces. As Minamoto confronts Magi, he discloses B.A.B.E.L.'s objective to detain P.A.N.D.R.A. and prevent the impending attack, subsequently permitting their departure to assist Hyōbu. While Hyōbu engages numerous U.S. combat drones, a special operations unit boards the ship and seizes Yūgiri. Andy intervenes but is shot by his superior, who escapes with both Yūgiri and Ihachigo. Protected by his limiter, Andy survives unharmed. With his body failing, Hyōbu unleashes his full power, annihilating the assault fleet before collapsing unconscious. Catastrophe sustains critical damage from a final attack and sinks, though all personnel except Hyōbu and Andy successfully evacuate.
10	"Distant Paradise" (Original Sin); Transliteration: "Tōi Rakuen" (Japanese: 遠い楽園)	March 12, 2013
Andy rescues the unconscious Hyōbu from the sinking Catastrophe, and both are recovered by B.A.B.E.L. Fujiko and Sakaki transport Hyōbu to the Tsubomi Estate for medical treatment, while Oboro supervises the surgical removal of Andy's U.S. transmitter chip with assistance from The Children. Kaoru compels Shiho to restrain Oboro and disclose Hyōbu's location. Andy accompanies The Children to the estate, where Hyōbu identifies their mysterious contact as Eiji Saotome—confirming his survival decades after their last encounter. Sakaki reveals Hyōbu's terminal condition to The Children, prompting Kaoru to volunteer a blood transfusion. Meanwhile, Eiji prepares to exploit Yūgiri and Ihachigo to prevent the impending Esper Revolution orchestrated by Hyōbu and Kaoru. Despite incomplete recovery, Hyōbu departs with Andy to confront Eiji and retrieve Yūgiri, disregarding Kaoru's objections.
11	"The Two Within the Storm" (Outlaws); Transliteration: "Arashi no naka no Futari" (Japanese: 嵐の中のふたり)	March 19, 2013
Andy and Hyōbu detain Andy's former USEI contact, coercing him to lead them to Yūgiri's holding facility. The agent secretly alerts his team, resulting in an ambush upon their arrival. Eiji reveals his plan to weaponize Yūgiri against Kaoru before P.A.N.D.R.A. reinforcements rescue the pair. Regrouped, P.A.N.D.R.A. travels to New York after Hyōbu deduces Eiji will target Mayor Norman Green, an esper-rights advocate. Meanwhile, Yūgiri—appearing under external control—defeats Magi, Momiji, and Yoh before confronting Andy.
12	"To the Future" (Last Resolution); Transliteration: "Mirai e" (Japanese: 未来へ)	March 26, 2013
Andy pursues Yūgiri to Mayor Norman Green's inauguration but is detained until Minamoto and Sakaki intervene, revealing their collaboration with Liberty Bell to stop Eiji's assassination plot. Yūgiri's hypnotic trance triggers a citywide riot, affecting all except Andy's allies. Hyōbu breaks Yūgiri's trance by overpowering his own physical limits, nearly dying until Andy restrains his abilities. After B.A.B.E.L. quells the riot, Hyōbu confronts Eiji—erasing his memories rather than killing him. Andy bids farewell to P.A.N.D.R.A. and departs.

=== Manga ===
A manga adaptation by Rokurou Ogaki was serialized in Shogakukan's Shōnen Sunday S from March 25, 2013, to May 25, 2015. A two-chapter additional story, titled Wanderer (放浪者, Hōrōsha), was published in Shōnen Sunday S on June 25 and July 25, 2015. Shogakukan collected its chapters in six tankōbon volumes, released from to August 16, 2013, to September 18, 2015.

==== Volumes ====
No.	Japanese release date	Japanese ISBN
1	August 16, 2013	978-4-09-124370-6
2	January 17, 2014	978-4-09-124598-4
3	July 18, 2014	978-4-09-125179-4
4	April 24, 2015	978-4-09-125544-0
5	July 17, 2015	978-4-09-126160-1
6	September 18, 2015	978-4-09-126407-7

== See also ==
- Akudama Drive, an anime series with a manga adaptation by Rokurou Ogaki
- Crazy Food Truck, a manga series by Rokurou Ogaki
