= Ryoko Shiraishi =

Japanese voice actress and singer

- 白石 涼子
- Born: September 7, 1982 (age 44); Kashiba, Nara, Japan
- Occupations: Voice actress; singer
- Years active: 2002–present
- Agent: Aoni Production
- Notable work: Honkai: Star Rail as Arlan; Arknights as Fang, Cliffheart; Final Fantasy Type-0 as Rem Tokimiya; Hayate the Combat Butler as Hayate Ayasaki; Sket Dance as Hime "Himeko" Onizuka; Sonic Unleashed as Chip; Tekken as Asuka Kazama; Voice dub for Miley Cyrus

Ryoko Shiraishi (白石 涼子, Shiraishi Ryōko; born September 7, 1982) is a Japanese voice actress and singer from Kashiba, Nara. She is affiliated with Aoni Production.

Possessing a husky voice, Shiraishi voices young to teenage men as well as young girls and teenage women. However, in a break from tradition, one of her most famous roles is the brash and hot-headed Asuka Kazama, who is noted for speaking with a strong Osaka accent, which is one of Shiraishi's specialist skills. She was also formerly a member of the voice acting unit Drops, along with Ai Nonaka, Akemi Kanda, Tomoko Kaneda, and Mariko Kōda.

Shiraishi is also very active in voice dubbing foreign dramas and movies. In particular, she is exclusively in charge of covering Miley Cyrus' roles. Many of her dubbing works are closely relative to the Disney Channel.

Shiraishi married on September 6, 2012, but divorced in 2013.

== Filmography ==
=== Anime series ===
Year	Title	Role	Other notes	Sources
2002	GetBackers	Ginji Amano (young)		
2003	Air Master	Waitress		
2003	Bobobo-bo Bo-bobo	Remu		
2003	D.C.: Da Capo	Mikkun		
2003	Mugen Senki Potorisu	Yūma		
2003	One Piece	Akibi		
2003	Pocket Monsters Advanced Generation	Haruka's Wurmple/Silcoon/Beautifly; Others		
2004	Fafner of the Azure	Rina Nishio		
2004	Magical Girl Lyrical Nanoha	Miyuki Takamachi		
2004	Tenjho Tenge	Chiaki Kōnoike		
2004	Tweeny Witches	Iga		
2005	Aria	Ayumi K. Jasmine		
2005	Mahoraba ~Heartful Days	Ryūshi Shiratori		
2005	Negima! Magister Negi Magi	Kaede Nagase		
2005	Noein: To Your Other Self	Tobi		
2005	Shakugan no Shana	Sorath/Aizenji		
2005	Xenosaga: The Animation	Mary Godwin		
2006	Air Gear	Akito/Agito Wanijima		
2006	Glass Fleet	Novy		
2006	Kekkaishi	Young Yoshimori (Aoi Shinagawa)		
2006	Negima!?	Kaede Nagase		
2006	Pocket Monsters Diamond & Pearl	Haruka's Beautifly; Child		
2007	Hayate the Combat Butler	Hayate Ayasaki; Britney		
2007	Hidamari Sketch	Riri		
2007	Himawari!	Azami		
2007	Kemeko Deluxe!	Ryōko Kurosaki		
2007	Mushi-Uta	Kyōko Kazama		
2007	Nagasarete Airantō	Rin; Shizuku; Inuinu; Hatsu; Others		
2007	Sky Girls	Takumi Hayami		
2008	Mobile Suit Gundam 00	Anew Returner	Season 2	
2008	Naruto Shippūden	Fū; Matatabi		
2008	Net Ghost PiPoPa	Pit		
2008	Zettai Karen Children	Aoi Nogami		
2009	Hatsukoi Limited	Meguru Watase		
2009	Hayate the Combat Butler!!	Hayate Ayasaki	Season 2	
2009	Kaidan Restaurant	Ako Ōzora		
2009	Natsu no Arashi!	Sayōko Arashiyama		
2009	Nyan Koi!	Kanako Sumiyoshi		
2009	Saki	Mako Someya		
2010	And Yet the Town Moves	Harue Haribara		
2010	Bleach	Kyōko Haida		
2010	Cobra the Animation	Bonnie		
2010	Digimon Xros Wars	Hinomoto Akari; Mervamon; Opossumon		
2010	HeartCatch PreCure!	Aya Mizushima		
2010	Working!!	Kazue Takanashi		
2011	Beelzebub	Nāga		
2011	Gintama'	Jugem Jugem (the Monkey); Lord Morimori; Hime "Himeko" Onizuka	Eps 221-222; Ep 222; Ep 227	
2011	Horizon in the Middle of Nowhere	Makiko Oriotorai		
2011	I Don't Like You at All, Big Brother!!	Hirono Kusuhara		
2011	Lotte no Omocha!	Porhelga Svarthaed		
2011	Sket Dance	Hime "Himeko" Onizuka		
2011	YuruYuri	Nana Nishigaki		
2012	AKB0048	Takahashi Minami The 5th/Takamina/Arisawa Shiori		
2012	Boku no Imōto wa "Ōsaka Okan"	Kyōsuke Ishihara		
2012	Busou Shinki	Zelnogrard		
2012	Danball Senki W	Kojō Asuka		
2012	Hayate the Combat Butler: Can't Take My Eyes Off You	Hayate Ayasaki	Season 3	
2012	Ixion Saga DT	Yodogawa Alan		
2012	Nisemonogatari	Yozuru Kagenui		
2012	Smile PreCure!	Genki Hino		
2012	Sword Art Online	Yulier		
2012	Yu-Gi-Oh! Zexal II	Ponta		
2013	Gundam Build Fighters	Misaki		
2013	Hayate the Combat Butler: Cuties	Hayate Ayasaki	Season 4	
2013	Kyōsōgiga	Un; Kurama (young)		
2013	Senran Kagura	Hikage		
2014	Amagi Brilliant Park	Macaron		
2014	Battle Spirits: Saikyou Ginga Ultimate Zero	Garbo; Ian		
2014	Blade & Soul	Ron		
2014	Broken Blade	Nike		
2014	D-Frag!	Sakuragaoka		
2014	Girl Friend Beta	Noriko Kiryu		
2014	Gugure! Kokkuri-san	Kokkuri-san (female)		
2014	Saki: The Nationals	Mako Someya	Season 3	
2014	Yowamushi Pedal	Shōkichi Naruko (young)		
2015	Anti-Magic Academy: The 35th Test Platoon	Ikaruga Suginami		
2015	Aquarion Logos	Sakurako Soda		
2015	Chaos Dragon	Setsuren		
2015	Death Parade	Quin		
2015	Fafner in the Azure: Exodus	Rina Nishio		
2015	Lupin the 3rd Part IV: The Italian Adventure	Belladonna	Season 3	
2015	My Wife is the Student Council President	Kei Misumi		
2015	The Seven Deadly Sins	Goddess Clan		
2015	Seiyu's Life!	Herself		
2015	Triage X	Sayo Hitsugi		
2016	Cheer Boys!!	Kirari Suzuki		
2016	Fate/kaleid liner Prisma Illya 3rei!	Angelica	Season 4	
2016	ReLIFE	Sumire Inukai		
2016	Super Lovers	Kiri Kondō		
2016–18	Chi's Sweet Adventure	Yōhei		
2017	Altair: A Record of Battles	Niki Al-Bahram		
2017	Beyblade Burst Evolution (Note: Known in Japan as "Beyblade Burst God".)	Free De La Hoya		
2017	Boruto: Naruto Next Generations	Chocho Akimichi; Eho Norimaki		
2017	Dragon Ball Super	Sanka Ku; Shantza		
2017	Kado: The Right Answer	Shimako Yuri		
2018	Beyblade Burst Turbo (Note: Known in Japan as "Beyblade Burst Chouzetsu" (Super Z).)	Free De La Hoya		
2018	Forest of Piano	Kai Ichinose (young)		
2018	Yu-Gi-Oh! VRAINS	Haru		
2019	Demon Slayer: Kimetsu no Yaiba	Spider Demon (older sister)		
2019	Girly Air Force	Rhino		
2019	The Life Extra	Riki Shimizu; Maruta		
2020	Digimon Adventure:	Sora Takenouchi		
2021–present	One Piece	Bao Huang, Vegapunk Edison		
2021	Pokémon Master Journeys: The Series	Asahi		
2021	To Your Eternity	Gugu (child)		
2021	World Trigger	Yomi	Season 2	
2021	Yashahime	Yawaragi		
2023	The Kingdoms of Ruin	Chloe		
2023–24	My Hero Academia	Toya Todoroki (young)	Season 6-Season 7	
2024	Bartender: Glass of God	Yuri Kinjо̄		
2024	Chi's Sweet Summer Vacation	Yōhei		
2024	Shinkalion: Change The World	Ido		
2025	Hell Teacher: Jigoku Sensei Nube	Hiroshi Tateno		
2025	The Red Ranger Becomes an Adventurer in Another World	Shauha		
2025	Witch Watch	Utsuro Akizuki		
2026	Digimon Beatbreak	Rose Woodville		
2026	Kujima: Why Sing, When You Can Warble?	Miyoshi Kōda		

=== Original net animation (ONA) ===
Year	Title	Role	Sources
2014	Fastening Days	Kei	
2020	Beyblade Burst Surge (Note: Known in Japan as "Beyblade Burst Sparking" or "Beyblade Burst Superking".)	Free De La Hoya	
2021	Beyblade Burst Dynamite Battle	Free De La Hoya	
2021	Powerful Pro Yakyū Powerful Kōkō-hen	Power Pro	
2021	Star Wars: Visions – The Twins	Am	
2023	Akuma-kun	Sanae Kazama	
2024	Chi's Sweet Summer Vacation	Yōhei	

=== Original video animation (OVA) ===
Year	Title	Role
2005	Hotori: Tada Saiwai o Koinegau	Suzu
2006	Hellsing Ultimate	Schrödinger
2006	Negima!?	Kaede Nagase
2006	Pinky:St	Ran
2006	Sky Girls	Takumi Hayami
2008	Naisho no Tsubomi	Daiki Nemoto
2009	Dogs: Bullets & Carnage	Mimi
2009	Hayate the Combat Butler	Hayate Ayasaki
2009	Zan Sayonara, Zetsubou Sensei Bangaichi	Tane Kitsu
2010	Air Gear: Kuro no Hane to Nemuri no Mori	Akito/Agito Wanijima
2011	Busou Shinki Moon Angel	Zelnogrard
2014	Hayate the Combat Butler	Hayate Ayasaki
2015	Senran Kagura: Estival Versus – Festival Eve Full of Swimsuits	Hikage
2016	The Day Naruto Became Hokage	Chocho Akimichi

=== Anime films ===
Year	Title	Role
2003	Odoru Pokémon Himitsu Kichi	Whismur
2003	Pocket Monsters Advanced Generation the Movie: The Wishing Star of Seven Nights: Jirachi	Pokémon-tachi
2004	Pocket Monsters Advanced Generation the Movie: Deoxys, the Visitor from a Fissure in the Sky	Haruka's Beautifly
2007	Cinnamon the Movie	Espresso
2009	The Rebirth of Buddha	Amanokawa Shunta
2010	Fafner in the Azure: Heaven and Earth	Rina Nishio
2011	Break Blade 4: Sanka no Chi	Nike
2011	Break Blade 5: Shisen no Hate	Nike
2011	Hayate the Combat Butler! Heaven Is a Place on Earth	Hayate Ayasaki
2011	Towa no Quon	Yuri
2012	Inazuma Eleven GO vs. Danbōru Senki W	Asuka Kojō
2016	Doraemon: Nobita and the Birth of Japan 2016	Kukuru
2020	Happy-Go-Lucky Days	Shin-chan's mother
2021	Farewell, My Dear Cramer: First Touch	Junpei Onda
2024	Dead Dead Demon's Dededede Destruction	Makoto Tainuma

=== Video games ===
Year	Title	Role	Other notes/Sources
2004	Black Matrix OO	Cain	
2004	Clannad	Kappei Hiiragi	
2004	Tekken 5	Asuka Kazama	
2005	Memories Off 5 The Unfinished Film	Ayumu Kise	
2005	Rogue Galaxy	Chie; Young Jaster	
2005	Tales of Legendia	Jay	
2005	Tekken 5: Dark Resurrection	Asuka Kazama	
2005	Wild Arms 4	Jude Maverick	
2006	Wrestle Angels: Survivor	Tomomi Watanabe; Shiho Kobayakawa	
2007	Tekken 6	Asuka Kazama	
2008	Luminous Arc 2: Will	Pip	
2008	Mamorukun Curse!	Mamoru Tomoka	
2008	Sonic Unleashed	Chip/Light Gaia	
2008	Tekken 6: Bloodline Rebellion	Asuka Kazama	
2009	New Little King's Story	Princess Iris	
2009	Rune Factory 3	Mais	
2009	Sunday VS Magazine: Shuuketsu! Choujou Daikessen!	Hayate Ayasaki	
2010	Nier	Devola & Popola	
2011	Final Fantasy Type-0	Rem Tokimiya	
2011	Senran Kagura: Shojo-tachi no Shin'ei	Hikage	
2011	Tales of Xillia	Sylph	
2011	Tekken Tag Tournament 2	Asuka Kazama	
2012	Corpse Seed 3 (Note: Known as Love Dance Seed in the NA version.)	Ayumu Asuka	
2012	Dead or Alive 5	Mila	
2012	Digimon World Re:Digitize	Taiga	
2012	Senran Kagura Burst: Guren no Shojo-tachi	Hikage	
2012	Shining Blade	Yukihime	
2012	Tekken 3D: Prime Edition	Asuka Kazama	
2012	Tekken Tag Tournament 2 Unlimited	Asuka Kazama	
2012	Tekken Tag Tournament 2: Wii U Edition	Asuka Kazama	
2012	Yakuza 5	Mai Sanada	
2013	Armored Hunter Gunhound EX	Juliane Yuri	
2013	Beyond: Two Souls	Jodie Holmes (Elliot Page) (Japanese dub)	
2013	JoJo's Bizarre Adventure: All Star Battle	Foo Fighters (F.F.)	
2013	Naruto Shippuden: Ultimate Ninja Storm 3	Fū	
2013	Senran Kagura Shinovi Versus: Shojo-tachi no Shomei	Hikage	
2013	Super Robot Wars UX	Rina Nishio; Hurricane	
2013	Tekken Revolution	Asuka Kazama	
2014	Corpse Seed 3: Heartclub Extreme	Ayumu Asuka	
2014	Granblue Fantasy	Loki; Societte	
2014	J-Stars Victory VS	Hime "Himeko" Onizuka	
2014	Samurai Warriors 4	Koshōshō	
2015	Crash Fever	Darwin	
2015	Dragon Ball Xenoverse	Time Patroller (Female 6)	
2015	Final Fantasy Type-0 HD	Rem Tokimiya	
2015	JoJo's Bizarre Adventure: Eyes of Heaven	Foo Fighters (F.F.)	
2015	Tekken 7	Asuka Kazama; Kazuya (young)	
2015	Until Dawn	Sam (Hayden Panettiere) (Japanese dub)	
2015	Xenoblade Chronicles X	Avatar	
2016	Dragon Ball Xenoverse 2	Time Patroller	
2016	Tekken 7: Fated Retribution	Asuka Kazama	
2016	Yakuza Kiwami	Saya Date	
2017	Corpse Seed 4	Ayumu Asuka	
2017	Dissidia Final Fantasy Opera Omnia	Rem Tokimiya	
2017	Nier: Automata	Devola & Popola	
2018	Corpse Seed 4: Endless Brawl	Ayumi Asuka	
2019	Arknights	Cliffheart; Fang	
2019	Counter:Side	Kasukabe Yuri (Lee Yuri)	
2019	Dead or Alive 6	Mila	
2019	Gunvolt Chronicles: Luminous Avenger iX	Stella	
2019	New Sakura Wars	Komachi Ohba	
2020	Clock over ORQUESTA (CLOQUESTA)	Mito Azusawa (Youth "Never↓and" form)	Season 1
2022	Clock over ORQUESTA (CLOQUESTA)	Mito Azusawa (Youth "Never↓and" form)	Return match BATTLE all-in
2023	Honkai: Star Rail	Arlan	
2024	Clock over ORQUESTA (CLOQUESTA)	Mito Azusawa (Youth "Never↓and" form)	Season 2
2024	Clock over ORQUESTA (CLOQUESTA)	Mito Azusawa (Youth "Never↓and" form)	Season 3
2024	Tekken 8	Asuka Kazama	

=== Tokusatsu ===
Year	Title	Role	Other notes/Sources
2019-20	Kishiryu Sentai Ryusoulger	Kleon	

=== Dubbing roles ===
==== Live-action ====
Year	Title	Role	Voice dub for	Other notes/Sources
2001	Frailty	Adam (young)	Jeremy Sumpter	
2001	When Good Ghouls Go Bad	Ryan Kankle	Craig Marriott	
2002	Antwone Fisher	Antwone Fisher (age 7)	Malcolm David Kelley	
2002	Foyle's War	Gwen Rivers	Joanna Horton	Episode "A War of Nerves"
2002	Men in Black II	Elizabeth	Chloe Sonnenfeld	
2003	Eddie's Million Dollar Cook-Off	Oliver	Daniel Costello	
2003	The Fighting Temptations	Dean	Darrell Vanterpool	
2004	EuroTrip	Bert Thomas	Nial Iskhakov	
2004	The Final Cut	Alan Hickman (young)	Casey Dubois	
2004	Ladder 49	Nicky Morrison	Spencer Berglund	
2004	Soccer Dog: European Cup	Mickey	Eric Don	
2005	Down in the Valley	Lonnie	Rory Culkin	
2005	Duma	Xan	Alexander Michaeletos	
2006	Hannah Montana	Miley Stewart / Hannah Montana	Miley Cyrus	
2006	Kyle XY	Lori Trager	April Matson	
2006	Step Up	Nora Clark	Jenna Dewan	
2007	August Rush	Evan Taylor / August Rush	Freddie Highmore	
2007	Good Luck Chuck	Charles "Chuck" Logan (young)	Connor Price	
2007	Underdog	Molly	Taylor Momsen	
2008	Kung Fu Dunk	Li-li	Charlene Choi	
2008	The Longshots	Jasmine Plummer	Keke Palmer	
2008	Merlin	Mordred (young)	Asa Butterfield	
2009	Amelia	Elinor Smith	Mia Wasikowska	
2009	Glee	Sunshine Corazon	Charice	
2009	Hannah Montana: The Movie	Miley Stewart / Hannah Montana	Miley Cyrus	
2009	Indiana Jones and the Temple of Doom	Short Round	Ke Huy Quan	2009 WOWOW edition
2009	The Suite Life on Deck: Wizards on Deck with Hannah Montana	Hannah Montana	Miley Cyrus	
2009	The Vampire Diaries	Anna	Malese Jow	
2010	The Last Song	Veronica "Ronnie" Miller	Miley Cyrus	
2010	Piranha 3D	Danni	Kelly Brook	
2010	Sex and the City 2	Herself	Miley Cyrus	
2011	Brain Games	Herself	Kristen Bell	
2011	Footloose	Ariel Moore	Julianne Hough	
2011	Pan Am	Colette Valois	Karine Vanasse	
2011	Ringer	Juliet Martin	Zoey Deutch	
2011	Shameless	Tami Tamietti	Kate Miner	
2011	Terra Nova	Maddy Shannon	Naomi Scott	
2012	Dark Shadows	Carolyn Stoddard	Chloë Grace Moretz	
2012	Home Alone: The Holiday Heist	Finn Baxter	Christian Martyn	
2012	The Impossible	Thomas Bennett	Samuel Joslin	
2012	Inception	Ariadne	Elliot Page	2012 TV Asahi edition
2012	The Possession	Emily "Em" Brenek	Natasha Calis	
2013	Bel Ami	Kim Bo-tong	IU	
2013	The Butler	Carol Hammie	Yaya DaCosta	
2013	Devil's Pass	Holly King	Holly Goss	
2013	Ender's Game	Valentine Wiggin	Abigail Breslin	
2013	The Great Gatsby	Daisy Buchanan	Carey Mulligan	
2013	Olympus Has Fallen	Connor Asher	Finley Jacobson	
2013	Save Haven	Katie Feldman/Erin Tierney	Julianne Hough	
2013	Witches of East End	Freya Beauchamp	Jenna Dewan	
2013	The Wolf of Wall Street	Naomi Lapaglia	Margot Robbie	
2014	Back to the Future	Jennifer Parker	Claudia Wells	2014 BS Japan edition
2014	The Guest	Anna Peterson	Maika Monroe	
2014	Halo: Nightfall	Macer	Christina Chong	
2014	If I Stay	Mia Hall	Chloë Grace Moretz	
2014	It Follows	Jaime "Jay" Height	Maika Monroe	
2014	The Leftovers	Jill Garvey	Margaret Qualley	
2015	Fifty Shades of Grey	Anastasia "Ana" Steele	Dakota Johnson	
2015	The Meddler	Jillian	Cecily Strong	
2015	The Night Before	Herself	Miley Cyrus	
2016	Crouching Tiger, Hidden Dragon: Sword of Destiny	Mantis	Ngô Thanh Vân	
2016	Edge of Winter	Caleb Baker	Percy Hynes White	
2016	Quantum of Solace	Camille Montes	Olga Kurylenko	2016 BS Japan edition
2016	Seoul Station	Hye-sun	Shim Eun-kyung	
2016	Vincent N Roxxy	Roxxy	Zoë Kravitz	
2017	Awakening the Zodiac	Zoe Branson	Leslie Bibb	
2017	Bad Genius	Lynn	Chutimon Chuengcharoensukying	
2017	Fifty Shades Darker	Anastasia "Ana" Steele	Dakota Johnson	
2017	First Kill	Danny Beeman	Ty Shelton	
2017	Flatliners	Courtney Holmes	Elliot Page	
2017	The Good Doctor	Dr. Claire Brown	Antonia Thomas	
2017	Jumanji: Welcome to the Jungle	Ruby Roundhouse	Karen Gillan	
2017	Table 19	Eloise McGarry	Anna Kendrick	
2018	The Darkest Minds	Ruby Daly	Amandla Stenberg	
2018	Fifty Shades Freed	Anastasia "Ana" Steele	Dakota Johnson	
2018	Free Solo	Herself	Sanni McCandless	
2019	Jumanji: The Next Level	Ruby Roundhouse	Karen Gillan	
2020	Clouds	Sammy Brown	Sabrina Carpenter	
2020	Happiest Season	Abby	Kristen Stewart	
2021	Fires	Mish McCauley	Charlotte Best	
2021	Frank of Ireland	Áine	Sarah Greene	
2021	The Lost Daughter	Nina	Dakota Johnson	
2021	Running Wild with Bear Grylls	Herself	Caitlin Parker	Episode "Bobby Bones & fiancée Caitlin Parker"
2021	Snake Eyes	Major O'Hara / Scarlett	Samara Weaving	
2021	Stillwater	Allison Baker	Abigail Breslin	
2021	Yellowjackets	Jackie	Ella Purnell	
2022	Rambo: Last Blood	Gizelle	Fenessa Pineda	2022 BS Tokyo edition
2022	The Time Traveler's Wife	Clare Abshire	Rose Leslie	
2022	Uncharted	Jo Braddock	Tati Gabrielle	
2022	Vampire Academy	Lissa Dragomir	Daniela Nieves	
2024	The Blind	Kay Robertson	Amelia Eve; Brielle Robillard	
2024	Oppenheimer	Jean Tatlock	Florence Pugh	
2024	The Penguin	Sofia Gigante (née Falcone)	Cristin Milioti	
2025	The Beekeeper	Verona Parker	Emmy Raver-Lampman	
2025	Asteroid City	The actress playing Steenbeck's deceased wife	Margot Robbie	
2026	Crime 101	Maya	Monica Barbaro	
2026	The Odyssey	Athena	Zendaya	
2026	Barbarian	Tess	Georgina Campbell	

==== Animation ====
Year	Title	Role	Voice dub for
1976	Monica & Friends	Maggy	Elza Gonçalves
2001	Jimmy Neutron: Boy Genius	Jimmy Neutron	Debi Derryberry
2002	The Adventures of Jimmy Neutron: Boy Genius	Jimmy Neutron	Debi Derryberry
2005	Tom and Jerry: Blast Off to Mars	Peep	Kathryn Fiore
2007	Meet the Robinsons	Lewis	Jordan Fry; Daniel Hansen
2008	Bolt	Penny	Miley Cyrus
2010	Team Umizoomi	Geo	Ethan Kempner; Juan Mirt
2013	Tom and Jerry's Giant Adventure	Jack	Jacob Bertrand
2015	Home	Gratuity "Tip" Tucci	Rihanna
2016	Ice Age: Collision Course	Brooke	Jessie J
2019	101 Dalmatian Street	Dolly	Michaela Dietz
2021	Mechamato	Pian	Ielham Iskandar
2021	Trese	Alexandra Trese	Shay Mitchell
2022	Oni: Thunder God's Tale	Onari	Momona Tamada
2023	Nimona	Nimona	Chloë Grace Moretz
2024	The Casagrandes Movie	Punguari and Shara	Paulina Chávez
2025	Your Friendly Neighborhood Spider-Man	Carmilla Black	Anairis Quiñones
2026	The Bad Guys 2	Doom	Natasha Lyonne
2026	Gameoverse	Scratch	AmaLee
