= Crazy Food Truck =

Japanese manga series

- Cover of the first volume

クレイジーフードトラック (Kureijī Fūdo Torakku)
- Genre: Adventure, comedy
- Manga
- Written by: Rokurou Ogaki
- Published by: Shinchosha
- English publisher: NA: Viz Media
- Magazine: Monthly Comic @Bunch
- Original run: July 21, 2020 – December 21, 2021
- Volumes: 3

Crazy Food Truck (Japanese: クレイジーフードトラック, Hepburn: Kureijī Fūdo Torakku) is a Japanese manga series written and illustrated by Rokurou Ogaki. It was serialized on Shinchosha's Monthly Comic @Bunch manga website from July 2020 to December 2021 and published in three volumes.

== Publication ==
Written and illustrated by Rokurou Ogaki, the series began serialization on Shinchosha's Monthly Comic @Bunch manga website on July 21, 2020. The series completed its serialization on December 21, 2021. The series' individual chapters were collected into three volumes.

At New York Comic Con 2021, Viz Media announced that they licensed the series for English publication.

=== Volume list ===
No.	Original release date	Original ISBN	English release date	English ISBN
1	December 9, 2020	978-4-10-772341-3	May 17, 2022	978-1-9747-2729-2
2	July 8, 2021	978-4-10-772400-7	September 20, 2022	978-1-9747-3012-4
3	February 9, 2022	978-4-10-772467-0	March 21, 2023	978-1-9747-3597-6

== Reception ==
Christopher Farris from Anime News Network praised the action and culinary elements of the story, while criticizing the short length of the chapters, stating that it makes "characterization and content [feel] thin". Katherine Dacey from The Manga Critic criticized the story and artwork, calling the story "marred by lazy writing, paper-thin characterizations, and excessive fan service" and the artwork overly bland.

== See also ==
- Unlimited Psychic Squad - An anime series whose manga adaptation is also written and illustrated by Rokurou Ogaki
- Akudama Drive - An anime series whose manga adaptation is also written and illustrated by Rokurou Ogaki
