= Ghost Sweeper Mikami =

Japanese manga series and its adaptations

- First tankōbon volume cover, featuring Reiko Mikami (front), Tadao Yokoshima (left), and Okinu (back)

GS美神 極楽大作戦!! (Gōsuto Suīpā Mikami Gokuraku Daisakusen!!)
- Genre: Action; Comedy; Supernatural
- Manga
- Written by: Takashi Shiina
- Published by: Shogakukan
- Imprint: Shōnen Sunday Comics
- Magazine: Weekly Shōnen Sunday
- Original run: May 8, 1991 – September 22, 1999
- Volumes: 39
- Anime television series
- Directed by: Atsutoshi Umezawa
- Produced by: Tomoya Hirao (ABC); Yasuo Kameyama (Asatsu); Yoshifumi Hatano; Hiromi Seki
- Written by: Aya Matsui
- Music by: Toshihiko Sahashi
- Studio: Toei Animation
- Licensed by: NA: Sentai Filmworks
- Original network: ANN (ABC, TV Asahi)
- Original run: April 11, 1993 – March 6, 1994
- Episodes: 45
- Anime film
- Directed by: Atsutoshi Umezawa
- Studio: Toei Animation
- Licensed by: NA: Manga Entertainment
- Released: August 20, 1994
- Runtime: 60 minutes
- icon

Ghost Sweeper Mikami (Japanese: GS美神 極楽大作戦!!, Hepburn: Gōsuto Suīpā Mikami Gokuraku Daisakusen!!; lit. 'Ghost Sweeper Mikami: The Great Paradise Battle!!') is a Japanese manga series written and illustrated by Takashi Shiina. It was published in Shogakukan's shōnen manga magazine Weekly Shōnen Sunday from May 1991 to September 1999, with its chapters collected in 39 tankōbon volumes. It follows the exploits of a group of exorcists who try to combat supernatural forces in an effort to get paid. The series explores some folk religion themes such as possession, exorcism, shamanism, yūrei, and yōkai.

A 45-episode anime television series adaptation by Toei Animation was broadcast on the Asahi Broadcasting Corporation from April 1993 to March 1994. An anime film premiered in August 1994. The anime series was licensed in North America by Sentai Filmworks.

In 1993, Ghost Sweeper Mikami won the 38th Shogakukan Manga Award in the shōnen category.

== Plot ==
Overdevelopment and crowding in Japan has forced many of its spirits and ghosts out of their homes. Due to problems caused by the spirits, a new profession was created, the Ghost Sweepers (GS), private exorcists for hire. Among the Ghost Sweepers, the Mikami GS Agency, led by 31-year-old Reiko Mikami and her two assistants, the 17-year-old boy Tadao Yokoshima and the ghost girl Okinu, is said to be the best.

The setup is scenario-to-scenario, with many plots intertwining classic Japanese culture and modern day realities, with occasional references to Western influences. In between these plot points, there are longer story arcs where new characters are introduced and the existing characters are further developed. While the overarching storyline focuses on Reiko's contention with her arch-nemesis, Astaroth, the series is mostly character-driven and serves to gradually develop characters, especially the main protagonists.

== Characters ==
=== Mikami GS Agency ===
Reiko Mikami (美神 令子, Mikami Reiko)
Voiced by: Hiromi Tsuru (Japanese); Sharon Becker (English)
A 31-year-old exorcist using Japanese traditional methods and the president and owner of the ghost sweeping agency, Mikami GS. She uses a lightsaber-like energy sword as a spiritual weapon, exorcism charms, ofuda talismen and martial arts skills when dealing with supernatural entities. She was initially trained by the pastor father Karasu, but she was not satisfied with a life of poverty and seeks to become wealthy from the success of her exorcism business. Her motto is "profit comes first", often gouging her clients for a higher fee and is stingy when it comes to paying her employees.
Tadao Yokoshima (横島 忠夫, Yokoshima Tadao)
Voiced by: Ryō Horikawa (Japanese); Wayne Grayson (English)
A 17-year-old high school student, poorly paid assistant of Mikami. His hourly wage is 250 yen per hour, but later increased to 255 yen. He likes beautiful girls and is infatuated by both Okinu and Mikami, although he will chase any attractive woman. He appears to have dormant spiritual abilities and later on, with the help of Shoryuki, Yokoshima gains various abilities of his own. He also gains the unique ability of creating balls from spiritual energy called Monju, apparently the only one in the world with this power.
Kinu Himuro (氷室 キヌ, Himuro Kinu) / Okinu (おキヌ)
Voiced by: Mariko Kouda (Japanese); Debora Rabbai (English)
A teenage female ghost who was sacrificed over 300 years ago at the age of 15 or 16 to calm a volcanic mountain's anger. The process was unsuccessful and she became jibakurei or earthbound spirit. She first encountered Mikami and Yokoshima at the mountain's hot spring and Mikami "adopts" her to become the secretary and errand girl for Mikami's agency. Yokoshima is attracted to Okinu and she is fond of him, but they do not form a romantic relationship. Okinu's spirit eventually reunites with her body which was safely preserved in ice. She begins the life of a normal teenage girl, but after temporarily losing her memory, she realizes that she is a natural necromancer with healing powers and the ability to understand a spirits' pain.
Kenki-kun (見鬼くん)
A spiritual detector (霊体探知機) used by Mikami. It looks like a toy figure and contains a Seirei Seki (精霊石, "Spirit Stone") in its head which helps it point in the direction of the closest spiritual power. In the anime the Kenki-kun acts as the narrator.
Shibusaba Artificial Ghost no. 1 (渋鯖 人工幽霊壱号, Shibusaba Jinkō Yūrei Ichi-gō)
An artificial soul created by the occult scientist, Doctor Shibusaba and rightful owner of his under house under the name of Shibusaba's son. In the search for a strong spiritualist whose spiritual wave matches her own, Mikami became the house's new owner, and the building has served as her agency since then.

=== Karasu's Church ===
Kazuhiro Karasu (唐巣 和宏, Karasu Kazuhiro) / Father Karasu
Voiced by: Kazuyuki Sogabe (Japanese); Peter Patrikios (English)
A male Catholic priest exorcist who was expelled from the church because of his methods, he used to be both Mikamis' (mother and daughter) mentor, 45 years old. He is said to be one of the best and most powerful exorcists currently active thanks to his training on Myoushinzan, but with the progressing story, he becomes more like an advisor than a ghost sweeper. It is suggested that he will become the chairman of the GS community one day.
Pietro de Bloodeau (ピエトロ・ド・ブラドー, Pietoro do Buradō) / Pete (ピート, Pīto)
Voiced by: Toshiyuki Morikawa
A 700-year-old half vampire. He's currently a teenager in his physical appearance. He is the son of Count Bloodeau (Pronounced Blado) who is said to be "cousin of the husband of Count Dracula's sister". While he is currently a disciple of Father Karasu, he used to know Karasu years before. He also goes to the same school as Yokoshima, and because of his handsome look, he's very popular with many girls, including Emi Ogasawara. His big dream is to become an Occult G Man one day.

=== Doctor Chaos' Lab ===
Doctor Chaos (ドクター・カオス, Dokutā Kaosu)
Voiced by: Shigeru Chiba
An old senile male alchemist / exorcist with a genius level intellect. Being immortal (or at least 1000 years old), he has acquired much knowledge of the supernatural. Unfortunately, he forgets something he already knows if he tries to learn something new, which leads to him constantly rereading his old books and a lot of running gags. While nearly all of the main Ghost Sweepers other than Meiko and Mikami are implied to be in a very deep financial rut, Chaos is the Ghost Sweeper whose dire financial straits is most often displayed and he is regularly pursued by his landlady for the rent. He had to loan Maria out to Mikami as collateral for a loan to build Teresa, and in an anime episode where the group entered a movie set in Japan's Edo period, he and Maria were depicted as peasants.
Maria (マリア)
Voiced by: Wakana Yamazaki
A tough-fighting Gynoid and companion of Dr. Chaos, created from the image of Dr. Chaos's lover in his younger days. She is strong, fast and resistant to damage, hiding all kind of weapons in her body. She is a kind-hearted "person" who possesses a soul and the urge to serve mankind, unlike her sister Teresa. Maria acts as Dr. Chaos' main weapon, bodyguard and housekeeper.
Teresa (テレサ)
Voiced by: Maria Kawamura
The second android Chaos invented, though relying more on modern technology than magic. This might also be the reason she regards the humanity as a failure and even tried to conquer mankind. Through the clash with her sister Maria, she sunk into the ocean and her body has never been found.

=== Ogasawara GS Agency ===
Emi Ogasawara (小笠原 エミ, Ogasawara Emi)
Voiced by: Michie Tomizawa
A 29 years old dark-skinned female voodoo exorcist and chief competitor to Mikami's ghost sweeping business. According to Mikami, Emi is the strongest voodoo user worth competing with her and has three muscular assistants: Arnold, Schwarze and Negger. Even though they are competitors, they can rely on each other in times of emergency. Emi is apparently in love with Pietro de Bloodeau and uses any opportunity she can get to approach him. Unlike Mikami, Emi had a way darker past: she lost both her parents at the age of 10 and made a living as an assassin until the age of 15 when she gave up that career due to an incident.
Tiger Torakichi (タイガー 寅吉, Taigā Torakichi)
A large, muscular man, who is hired by Emi to defeat Mikami. After his failure, he stays as Emi's disciple and assistant. Tiger used to be a woman chaser just like Yokoshima and was nicknamed "molesting tiger", but he now has a fear of women. His has the ability to create illusions through telepathy.

=== Rokudō family ===
Meiko Rokudō (六道 冥子, Rokudō Meiko)
Voiced by: Kumiko Nishihara (Japanese); Jeanine Bartel (English)
An innocent-looking but extremely powerful female who directly controls 12 Shikigami, which are named after the Japanese names of the Twelve Heavenly Generals, legendary Hindu figures who became Buddhists: (Indara, Ajira, Kubira, Basara, Shindara, Sanchira, Haira, Makora, Shôtora, Anchira, Bikara, and Mekira). They're in animal form, caricatures of the symbols that these figures carry, which come from the Chinese counting series Earthly Branches. Normally they are under control, but whenever Meiko becomes distraught, her "pets" destroy anything or anyone within their reach. Unfortunately for all, Meiko is sensitive, weak-willed and easily hurt, therefore the Shikigami are set on the loose very frequently. She regards Reiko as her closest friend because she was the only person to ever talk to her and was able to calm Meiko down when she first lost control of her shikigami in public. Although she acts and looks younger than Mikami, she is actually older (her mother was shown to be pregnant with her before Mikami's mother even met her husband).
The 48th generation of Rokudō (六道 第48代, Rokudō Dai Yonjū-hachi-dai)
Voiced by: Nana Yamaguchi
The current mistress of the Rokudō mansion, and the former master of the Shikigami, she is still able to control them at will. She used to be both Mikami Michie's and Karasu's mentor, and after retiring from the GS business, she now runs the Rokudou Girl High school, a school for female elite spiritualists.

=== Occult G Men ===
Teruhiko Saijō (西条 輝彦, Saijō Teruhiko)
Mikami Michie's only known disciple, 28 years old. He traveled abroad to England in order to enhance his abilities, and is currently working as an Occult G Man in Japan. He is Reiko Mikami's first love, and even though they have been separated for 10 years, he still has feelings for her. Even though he claims to fight for justice, his methods are sometimes very dirty, making him a hypocrite.
Michie Mikami (美神 美智恵, Mikami Michie)
Mikami's mother, a first class GS who is in fact one of the strongest GS of all time, 39 years old. Her ability to time travel and absorb lightning might be due to her inherited powers from both of her parents, who used to be first class GS. Additionally she absorbed part of her husband's psychic ability and the power of a demon. At the age of 18, she became the apprentice of Karasu for a short period of time. With a very strong sense of justice, she believes that evil will never prevail, which is why she became a ghost sweeper in the first place.

=== Other Yokoshima's family members ===
Daishū Yokoshima (横島 大樹, Yokoshima Daishū)
okoshima's father, and a Casanova just like him. But unlike his son, Daishuu is very popular with women. He is shown to have incredible power for a regular person, and even manages to beat up spirits bare handed, which might be an explanation of the origin of Yokoshima's high spiritual power.
Yuriko Yokoshima (横島 百合子, Yokoshima Yuriko)
Yokoshima's mother. She used to work in the same company as Daishuu as his supervisor, but in the end she fell in love with him and married him. This puts her in a similar situation as Mikami currently, who is also showing feelings towards her subordinate.

=== Other Mikami's family members ===
Hinome Mikami (美神 ひのめ, Mikami Hinome)
Mikami's younger sister, who was given birth after the Ashtaroth incident. She possesses strong pyrokinetic abilities and is most likely to surpass her sister one day. Because her power is uncontrollable, it has to be sealed for as long as she cannot handle it.
Kimihiko Mikami (美神 公彦, Mikami Kimihiko)
Mikami's father, who is currently employed as a university professor, specialized in doing animal research abroad. Due to an accident, he gained an unmatchable telepathy ability he cannot control, only with Mikami Michie's help, they were able to weaken it so he can live a normal life. The two got married soon afterwards.

=== Other spiritualists ===
Yukinojou Date (伊達 雪之丞, Date Yukinojō)
A strong spiritualist and battle freak who mistakes everyone for his mother, who died when he was a child. It is implied that he is even poorer than Yokoshima because he always spends his entire money on training and travelling. He first served as Medusa's henchman, but later left their group and became an ally of Yokoshima. His technique is the demonic art "Masoujutsu", where he creates an armor to enhance his basic abilities.
Mari Ichimonji (一文字 魔理, Ichimonji Mari)
Student of the Rodudou Girls' school class 1-B, Okinu's classmate and the first friend Okinu made on her first school day. Used to be a delinquent girl, who has always been looking up to Yumi, even though they do not get along well. She is the brute strength type of fighter.
Kaori Yumi (弓 かおり, Yumi Kaori)
The class representative of 1-B, a very serious person. Because of her tough training as a child, she has developed a strong urge for success, at cost of her classmates.
Megumi Marin (魔鈴 めぐみ, Marin Megumi)
Keeper of the restaurant Marin and an ingenious witch. A very honest and direct person, which is why she does not get along with Mikami. She used to study medieval arts in England together with Saijou, recovering long lost spells. At night, she works as an exorcist, who does not rely on heavy equipment like the rest of the GS, instead she sticks to her "Principle of balance and tidiness", on which Mikami seriously doubts.
Tamamo (タマモ)
Formerly known as Kinmō Hakumen Kyūbi no Yōko (金毛白面九尾の妖狐), she used to be a nine-tailed fox living in the royal palace during the Yuujō period. After her unjustified execution, she has now been reborn as a fox girl simply known as Tamamo. Though she cannot remember much of her past life, she still possesses various abilities of her fox self. To help her integrate into human society, Mikami has adopted her.
Shiro Inuzuka (犬塚 シロ, Inuzuka Shiro)
A young girl of the Jinrō (wolf people) tribe—though at times she acts more like a dog than a wolf—she is energetic and cheerful. Impressed by Yokoshima's "Hand of Glory", she became his apprentice, in order to avenge her father's death. After her revenge, she stayed as Yokoshima's disciple (always refers to him as "sensei"), and is planning to become a GS one day. After the main event, Shiro came back to the agency and is now officially part of Mikami's GS agency.

=== Gods ===
Shōryūki (小竜姫)
Voiced by: Wakana Yamazaki
A female warrior of the dragon god race who owns a training center in spiritual martial arts on top of a sacred mountain, Myoushinzan. She helped in unlocking Yokoshima's latent spiritual skills and increasing Mikami's power to her limits. Even though her power is immense, she cannot fight outside of her mountain for longer than 3 minutes, creating a parody of the live action show Ultraman as stated by Yokoshima.
Seitentaisei (斉天大聖)
Shoryuki's master and the ruler of the sky. As the protector god of Hinduism "Hanuman", he is one of the most powerful gods in existence. He helped in further developing Mikami's, Yokoshima's and Yukinojou's abilities.
Hyakume (ヒャクメ)
A dragon goddess, and Shoryuki's friend. With her 100 visual organs, nothing can escape her eyes (or so she claims), yet her enemies manage to fool her vision more than once. She is the inspector of the god's realm, responsible for investigations.
Medusa (メドーサ, Medōsa)
Voiced by: Kawanami Yoko
A renegade of the Dragon god's race and one of the top 5 wanted criminal on the black list, who vowed herself to Ashtaroth. She possesses equally strong powers to Shoryuki (or even stronger, since Shoryuki lost to her twice), and is able to summon her familiars (called "Big Eaters") at will. She dies during the siege on the moon by Yokoshima and Mikami's hand.

=== Demons ===
Ashtaroth (アシュタロス, Ashutarosu)
One of the few top class arch demon of Makai, on the same level as Satan himself. He is Mikami's arch nemesis. Ashtaroth's plan was to control the world using the "Cosmo Processor", which lets him gain control over the boundaries of life and death, freely arranging the molecular structure of everything. When Mikami and company destroyed the device, the raging Ashtaroth tried to destroy the human world, but in the end he lost against Yokoshima's true power. It is later revealed that Ashtaroth was only trying to defy his fate as a 'villain' and was seeking for death, but was unable to because of the balance problem.
Mephisto Pheles (メフィスト・フェレス, Mefisuto Feresu)
Reiko Mikami's past life, a low class demon Ashtaroth created. She fell in love with the mystic Takashima (Yokoshima's past life), and stole Ashtaroth's energy crystal. After Takashima's death, she became human, resulting in the energy crystal to be bound to her soul and inherited to Reiko Mikami.
Dogura Magura (土偶羅魔具羅)
A living dogū, and one of Ashtaroth's loyal servants. He is the one who created Luciola, Vespa and Papilio.
Luciola (ルシオラ, Rushiora)
All three of Ashtaroth's servants have been granted with incredibly strong powers as compensation for their short lifespan. Luciola is the oldest of the three demon sisters, her origin is a firefly, thus her name luciola. Even though she is dedicated to fulfill Ashtaroth's will, she falls in love with Yokoshima and is willing to sacrifice everything, including her life, for his sake. Her prior ability is to control the light to create illusions. She dies but, due to her spiritual union with Yokoshima, it is decided that she will reborn as his child in the future.
Vespa (ベスパ, Besupa)
Luciola's younger sister, her origin is a wasp. She is the kind of direct and sincere person, thus her fighting style is solely based on brute strength and speed to compensate her lack of special abilities. It is implied that she is in love with Ashtaroth. After his death, she joined the demon army.
Papilio (パピリオ, Papirio)
The youngest of the three sisters, her origin is a butterfly. Being the youngest, she is very playful, and likes to raise pets. Her ability is to create a barrier with her familiars. After Ashtaroth's fall, she became a disciple of Shoryuki.

=== Others ===
Yakuchin (厄珍)
Voiced by: Chafurin
He is the owner of a store that deals with many magical items. He is very greedy and will often overprice his wares if he has the chance.
Aiko (愛子)
Voiced by: Miki Itō
A yōkai of an old desk housing in Yokoshima's school, her only interest lies in getting to know the school life. Her catchphrase is "the spring of youth". It is implied that she is secretly in love with Yokoshima, who has a natural charm towards everything supernatural.
Kobato Hanato (花戸 小鳩, Hanato Kobato)
Due to the influence of Binboukami (god of poverty), she and her mother have been suffering poverty their entire life. With the help of Yokoshima however, they managed to turn the Binboukami into a god of luck, ending their demise. She also has feelings for Yokoshima, and is even willing to marry him.

== Media ==
=== Manga ===
Written and illustrated by Takashi Shiina, Ghost Sweeper Mikami debuted as a one-shot in Shogakukan's shōnen manga magazine Weekly Shōnen Sunday on May 8, 1991. The manga was then serialized in the same magazine from July 17, 1991, to September 22, 1999. Shogakukan collected its chapters in 39 tankōbon volumes, released from March 18, 1992, to November 18, 1999. Shogakukan re-released the series in a 20-volume wideban edition, published from December 16, 2002, to July 15, 2004; a 20-volume shinsōban edition from June 16, 2006, to March 16, 2007; and a 23-volume bunkoban edition from August 18, 2016, to June 15, 2018.

==== Volumes ====
No.	Japanese release date	Japanese ISBN
1	March 18, 1992	4-09-123031-8
2	May 18, 1992	4-09-123032-6
3	July 17, 1992	4-09-123033-4
4	September 18, 1992	4-09-123034-2
5	December 12, 1992	4-09-123035-0
6	March 18, 1993	4-09-123036-9
7	May 18, 1993	4-09-123037-7
8	July 17, 1993	4-09-123038-5
9	October 18, 1993	4-09-123039-3
10	December 11, 1993	4-09-123040-7
11	March 18, 1994	4-09-123321-X
12	May 18, 1994	4-09-123322-8
13	July 18, 1994	4-09-123323-6
14	November 18, 1994	4-09-123324-4
15	January 18, 1995	4-09-123325-2
16	March 18, 1995	4-09-123326-0
17	May 18, 1995	4-09-123327-9
18	July 18, 1995	4-09-123328-7
19	October 18, 1995	4-09-123329-5
20	January 18, 1996	4-09-123330-9
21	April 18, 1996	4-09-125001-7
22	July 18, 1996	4-09-125002-5
23	September 18, 1996	4-09-125003-3
24	November 18, 1996	4-09-125004-1
25	January 18, 1997	4-09-125005-X
26	April 18, 1997	4-09-125006-8
27	July 18, 1997	4-09-125007-6
28	October 18, 1997	4-09-125008-4
29	January 17, 1998	4-09-125009-2
30	March 18, 1998	4-09-125010-6
31	June 18, 1998	4-09-125431-4
32	August 8, 1998	4-09-125432-2
33	October 17, 1998	4-09-125433-0
34	January 18, 1999	4-09-125434-9
35	March 18, 1999	4-09-125435-7
36	May 18, 1999	4-09-125436-5
37	July 17, 1999	4-09-125437-3
38	September 18, 1999	4-09-125438-1
39	November 18, 1999	4-09-125439-X

=== Anime ===
A 45-episode anime television series adaptation, produced by Toei Animation, was broadcast on the Asahi Broadcasting Corporation from April 11, 1993, to March 6, 1994.

In North America, the series was licensed by Sentai Filmworks in 2010. The series was released on four DVD sets, in Japanese with English Subtitles, from November 23, 2010, to May 3, 2011.

==== Episodes ====
No.	Title	Written by	Original release date
1	"Here Comes the Super Sexy Exorcist!"; Transliteration: "Bodikon Joreishi Tōjō!" (Japanese: ボディコン除霊師登場!)	Aya Matsui	April 11, 1993
Reiko Mikami is hired to rid a mountain hotel of a ghost which is haunting its outdoor baths and she takes along Tadao Yokoshima to carry her baggage. She encounters the ghost, a jibakurei whose body is lost in the mountains which is keeping him tied to the human world. Meanwhile, Yokoshima encounters the ghost of Kinu Himuro who was sacrificed 300 years earlier to calm the volcanic mountain's anger. She has also become a jibakurei and is seeking to kill someone who would take her place. Mikami, with the help of Yokoshima and Kinu, manages to absorb the evil mountain spirit with a talisman which finally brings it peace. Later, she installs the hotel's ghost in its place to guard the mountain.
2	"Armed Robbers Have No Tomorrow!"; Transliteration: "Gōtō ni Ashita wa nai!" (Japanese: 強盗に明日はない!)	Aya Matsui	April 18, 1993
Two would-be bank robbers crash their car and die before they can carry out the job. They are now haunting the bank and the bank manager calls in Reiko Mikami to get rid of them but cannot agree on a price. Mikami strikes a bargain where she and the bank robbing ghosts can keep anything they can steal while the bank manager's security force tries to stop them. Mikami and Yokoshima successfully rob the bank with the aid of the ghosts who can then pass on to the afterlife. The bank's security forces catch up with Mikami and retrieve the money, however Okinu has entered the bank during the commotion and transfers a billion Yen to Mikami's account.
3	"The Empire of Haunted Dolls!!"; Transliteration: "Noroi no Ningyō Teikoku!!" (Japanese: 呪いの人形帝国!!)	Nobuaki Kishima	April 25, 1993
A little girl called Aya asks Mikami to find her dress-up Moga doll which was stolen by a ghost, and Mikami cannot refuse because of a prediction that she must accept the next job. In Aya's room Mikami finds a portal leading to another dimension, and enters with Yokoshima and Okina, but Aya follows them. They are confronted by a hoard of Moga dolls controlled by an evil spirit, but Aya convinces her own doll to rebel and Mikami neurtalises the spirit with a Talisman, returning the dolls to their owners.
4	"Ghost Sweeper in Space!!"; Transliteration: "Uchū Gōsuto Taiji!!" (Japanese: 宇宙ゴースト退治!!)	Masashi Noro	May 2, 1993
A Gremlin is causing problems at a TV satellite space station and Reiko Mikami is hired to solve the problem. Mikami sends Tadao Yokoshima's soul into space to take care of the Gremlin accompanied by Okinu. The gremlin attacks Yokoshima, but he is saved by the singing of Okina which chases it away. However, the gremlin leaves an egg and Yokoshima ends up caring for a baby gremlin when it hatches.
5	"The Howling of the Haunted Mansion!"; Transliteration: "Yūrei Yashiki no Tōboe!" (Japanese: 幽霊屋敷の遠吠え!)	Masaharu Amiya	May 9, 1993
A wealthy man is trying to demolish an old house to create a multi-story building in its place, but a ghost dog is causing trouble. He asks Reiko Mikami to take care of it, and also leaves his little dog with her for a while. The dog spirit is very strong and is a challenge to Mikami, however in subduing it, she discovers that it was the man's dog Kojirou which protected the house he lived in as a child, even after its death.
6	"The Princess Exorcist!"; Transliteration: "Ojōsama Joreishi!" (Japanese: お嬢さま除霊師!)	Aya Matsui	May 16, 1993
Reiko Mikami is hired to rid a new housing complex of a horde of ghosts, but she has to work with fellow ghost sweeper, Meiko Rokudou. Mikami tries to seal the building with talismen while Meiko uses her Shikigami to clear the interior of ghosts. However, when a ghost scratches Meiko she become upset, causing her Shikigami to completely destroy the complex.
7	"Dr. Chaos' Challenge!"; Transliteration: "Dr. Kaosu no Chōsen!" (Japanese: Dr.カオスの挑戦!)	Nobuaki Kishima	May 23, 1993
Doctor Chaos and Maria capture Tadao Yokoshima and Dr. Chaos switch his body with Yokoshima, taking his place to capture Reiko Mikami and obtain her body as it possess great spiritual powers.
8	"Love Overcomes the Test of Time! (Part 1 of 2)"; Transliteration: "Ai wa Jikan o Koete!" (Japanese: 愛は時間を越えて!)	Aya Matsui	May 30, 1993
Doctor Chaos creates a time-space potion which will completely erase a person's existence from the world. He adds some to a cake and has Maria deliver it to Reiko Mikami's office. Mikami notices something is suspicious with the cake, but Yokoshima eats some before she can stop him. Mikami works out the potion's purpose, and tells Yokoshima to recall something important from the last 24 hours, and he recalls when she accidentally kissed him while fighting a ghost. Yokoshima slowly disappears and finds himself at the mountain with Mikami when they first met Okinu. He tries to convince Mikami that he is from the future and to kiss him, but instead he is blasted further back into his past to when he was at high school. Outside the house which will eventually become her office, the schoolgirl Mikami passes by a crying Yokoshima and she just thinks he is annoying.
9	"Please Kiss Me!! (Part 2 of 2)"; Transliteration: "Onegai Chū Shite!!" (Japanese: お願いチューして!!)	Aya Matsui	June 6, 1993
Schoolboy Yokoshima follows the schoolgirl Mikami to her Ghost Sweeper training with Father Karasu. Yokoshima pretends to be possessed and requests that Mikami kiss him on the cheek, however Mikami suspects that he is faking. Suddenly Mikami's schoolmate, Chicho, arrives at the church. She is possessed by an evil spirit which was trapped in antique earrings she bought recently. Mikami does not know what to do, but Yokoshima hands her an energy sword and she dispels the spirit. Yokoshima requests a kiss in return, but while they argue about it, he disappears again. This time, Yokoshima wakes up as a baby, crying that he will never return. However, a very young Mikami comes up and kisses him on the cheek, returning him to the present.
10	"Find the Shikigami!!"; Transliteration: "Shikigami o Sagase!" (Japanese: 式神を捜せ!)	Masashi Noro	June 13, 1993
Meiko asks Mikami to help find her monkey-like Shikigami called Makola which has gone missing. It has the ability to transform and take the shape of living things, including humans. Mikami and Okinu agree to help in order to prevent Meiko becoming upset and releasing all her Shikigami. Yokoshima also offers to help, hoping to earn Meiko's eternal gratitude. Each of them become entangled in difficult situations during their separate searches, only to find out later that Makola found its own way home.
11	"Let's Take the Ghost Train!!"; Transliteration: "Rei Ressha de Ikō!!" (Japanese: 霊列車で行こう!!)	Masaharu Amiya	June 20, 1993
Mikami is hired by JR Tokai to investigate a ghostly Shinkansen which has begun appearing at night. She receives a mysterious ticket for the 2am Shinkansen and when she boards the ghostly train with Yokoshima and Okinu, they find the carriages crammed with the ghosts of people unable to pass into the afterlife. Makami fashions a mystical rope barrier with zigzag-shaped paper streamers and uses her energy sword to force their way through the ghosts towards the front of the train. The rope barrier breaks just as they reach the Green Car which stops the ghosts. They are then confronted by the evil spirit controlling the train, but Mikami manages to defeat it. A uniformed conductress appears who is the "heart of the train" and explains that she sent the ticket to Makimi. With the evil spirit removed, she and all the train's passengers can now be released and go to heaven.
12	"Beware of Yakuchin-do!?"; Transliteration: "Yakuchin-dō ni go-yōjin!?" (Japanese: 厄珍堂にご用心!?)	Nobuaki Kishima	June 27, 1993
Mikami is in bed with a cold, so she sends Okinu and Yokoshima to Yakuchin's store to pick up her order of magical items. Yakuchin convinces Yokoshima to try Catastrph-A, a tablet granting Psychic powers for 300 seconds and it seems to work. Back at Mikami's office, a beautiful woman seeks help to exorcise ghosts wearing samurai armor which have been haunting her store. Yokoshima takes the job and uses the tablets to defeat the samurai, however the real demon resides within the woman and she prepares to devour Yokoshima. Fortunately, Mikami has a vision of the events and arrives at the store in time to destroy the demon, but overusing the tablets causes Yokoshima's head to explode and he blacks out for three days. Yakuchin notes that the tablets appear to have unfortunate side effects.
13	"Rival Emi Ogasawara!"; Transliteration: "Raibaru! Ogasawara Emi!" (Japanese: 宿敵(ライバル)!小笠原エミ!)	Aya Matsui	July 4, 1993
Mikami's rival, Emi Ogasawara, arrives at her office headhunts Yokoshima to join her military-style team of Arnold, Schwarze and Negger. They must physically protect her while she dances to create her spirit-crushing wave, leaving them battered and bruised. Meanwhile Mikami is hired by the Jigoku Mafia Group to get rid of ghosts which they suspect are the work of the rival Gokuaku Group. Mikami suspects that the real cause is a curse created by Emi in conjunction with the police. Emi places a curse on Yokoshima turning him into a mud monster to defeat Mikami, but Mikami's hold over Yokoshima is too strong and she turns the curse against Emi, forcing her to run away while the monster pursues her.
14	"Summer! Pool! Monsters!"; Transliteration: "Natsu da Pūru da Yōkai da" (Japanese: 夏だプールだ妖怪だ)	Masashi Noro	July 11, 1993
Mikami's GS Agency is hired to remove spirits from a resort's water park. After three days waiting, a monstrous woman appears wearing a scanty swimsuit scaring away the vacationers. Mikami easily dispatches her and others spirits that appear, grateful that she sends them to the afterlife. An ugly monster emerges from the water, calling itself Complex, born from the grudges and hatred of holiday makers that have over others who they perceive as being better looking or more popular. Complex grows stronger by feeding off the energy of the romantically challenged Yokoshima and Mikami cannot defeat the monster until she knocks her hapless assistant unconscious.
15	"Assemble at the Mediterranean Sea! (Part 1 of 2)"; Transliteration: "Chichūkai ni Zen'inshūgō!" (Japanese: 地中海に全員集合!)	Aya Matsui	July 18, 1993
Master Karasu sends his trainee Pietro (Pete) to ask Mikami provide assistance for him on the island of Brando in the Mediterranean and he offers her the golden Condor of Malta statue as an inducement. He also invites Mikami's rivals, Emi Ogasawara, Dr. Chaos and Meiko Rokudou. On their way, their charter plane to the island is attacked by bats and a huge bat-like monster and the plane crashes into the sea. Pete explains that the monster was controlled by Duke Brando, a powerful vampire, who appears to be breaching a barrier set up by Karasu. After they finally arrive on the island, it appears that Pete is a vampire.
16	"Put The Vampire To Sleep! (Part 2 of 2)"; Transliteration: "Kyūketsuki o Nemurasero!" (Japanese: 吸血鬼を眠らせろ!)	Aya Matsui	July 25, 1993
The vampire Duke Brando bites Emi Ogasawara turning her into a vampire, but he is driven off by Pete who looks identical to him. Later, Emi attacks and bites Yokoshima also turning him into a vampire. Together they attack the others, and then all the villagers who have been turned into vampires attack as well. Mikami and the others take refuge in the basement where Pete leads them to safety and explains that Duke Brando is his father. They are caught by Brando and his vampire followers, but Pete attacks his father and as they bit each other, Brando loses power over those he has bitten. Once he is defeated, they return to normal, or at least they are no longer vampires.
17	"Temptations on the Summer Beach"; Transliteration: "Natsu no Umi wa Yūwaku Darake" (Japanese: 夏の海は誘惑だらけ)	Nobuaki Kishima	August 1, 1993
The manager of the Ounabara Marine Hotel asks Mikami to solve the mystery of sightings of a sea monster in and around the hotel. While Okina explores the seaside, Yokoshima makes a nuisance of himself by propositioning all the girls at the beach. Surprisingly a beautiful blond girl called Namiko befriends him and invites him to her hotel room. Namiko has ordered dinner including turban snails, but devours the hard shell as well as the animal. When water spills on Namiko she is revealed to be a mermaid. Her sea monster husband arrives and apologizes for being led astray by an evil ship ghost and pleads for Namiko to forgive him. Mikami arrives and attacks him but realizes that he is not a threat, however a storm-driven tsunami heads towards the beach, created by the abandoned ship ghost. Mikami heads into the water on her surfboard and destroys the ghost with a magic arrow from her crossbow and Namiko returns to the ocean with her husband and many children.
18	"Shrinking Mikami!!"; Transliteration: "Chijimiyuku Mikami!!" (Japanese: 縮みゆく美神!!)	Masaharu Amiya	August 15, 1993
At Takarazuka Animal Land, Mikami fights an evil jungle spirit which is causing the animals to behave violently, but she is struck by a dart from a blowgun. The next morning she awakes to find that she has shrunk to a miniature size, but when she goes with Okina and Yokoshima to find the spirit they find that all the animals have been turned against humans and she is snatched by a bird. After a series of mishaps, she confronts the spirit, riding atop Yokoshima, controlling him with a bridle until she finally sends the spirit to heaven, returning everything to normal.
19	"Chase the Ghost Submarine!"; Transliteration: "Yūrei Sensuikan o Oe!" (Japanese: 幽霊潜水艦を追え!)	Masashi Noro	August 22, 1993
The Marine Ultra Science Security Unit hires Mikami to investigate a ghost ship, but it is actually a submarine which sinks their ship. Mikami and company are rescued by Nagashima who has been chasing the ghost submarine for 50 years. He claims that his fellow naval trainee, Goro Nomura, sank Nagashima's destroyer out of jealousy because he was assigned to captain a lowly submarine. In rough water, Nagashima slips and knocks himself out, so Mikami takes control and creates gets Yokoshima to swim around the area and set up a spiritual barrier which will contain the submarine so it can no longer move.
20	"Heavenly Smash!"; Transliteration: "Gokuraku Sumasshu!!" (Japanese: 極楽スマッシュ!!)	Aya Matsui	August 29, 1993
Resort owner, Mr. Karasu, invites Mikami to his property to meet, but he also invited Emi who was expecting to meet Pete whom she was attracted to. Karasu has hired them both to exorcise the ghost of Reiko Ryugaki, the former owner of the mansion he has bought. Reiko's spirit cannot leave because of her obsession with tennis and she challenges Mikami and Emi to a Canadian doubles tennis match. Reiko looks set to win, however the large payment for exorcising the ghost spurs Mikami and Emi on to win, and Reiko's spirit is set free.
21	"Everyone, Turn Into A Kid!! (Part 1 of 2)"; Transliteration: "Minna Kodomo ni nare!!" (Japanese: みんな子供になれ!!)	Aya Matsui	September 5, 1993
22	"Devil Piper's Revenge (Part 2 of 2)"; Transliteration: "Akuma Paipā no Gyakushū" (Japanese: 悪魔パイパーの逆襲)	Aya Matsui	September 12, 1993
23	"The Path to the Dragon!! (Part 1 of 2)"; Transliteration: "Doragon e no Michi!!" (Japanese: ドラゴンへの道!!)	Aya Matsui	September 19, 1993
24	"Runaway Dragon in a Rage (Part 2 of 2)"; Transliteration: "Doragon Ikari no Bōsō" (Japanese: ドラゴン怒りの暴走)	Aya Matsui	September 26, 1993
25	"Himiko of the Yamatai Kingdom"; Transliteration: "Yamatai Kuni no Himiko" (Japanese: ヤマタイ国のヒミコ)	Nobuaki Kishima	October 3, 1993
26	"The Adventure of Heroine Mikami"; Transliteration: "Yūsha Mikami no Bōken!" (Japanese: 勇者・美神の冒険!)	Aya Matsui	October 10, 1993
27	"Pure-Hearted Maria in Love!"; Transliteration: "Maria Junjō Itchokusen!" (Japanese: マリア純情一直線!)	Masashi Noro	October 17, 1993
28	"Dragon Prince!! (Part 1 of 2)"; Transliteration: "Doragon no Ōji!!" (Japanese: ドラゴンの王子!!)	Nobuaki Kishima	October 24, 1993
29	"Dragon in Imminent Danger!! (Part 2 of 2)"; Transliteration: "Doragon Kikiippatsu!!" (Japanese: ドラゴン危機一髪!!)	Nobuaki Kishima	October 31, 1993
The dragon god, Shoryuki battles Medusa.
30	"Here Comes the Devilish Sword Shimesaba-Maru!"; Transliteration: "Yōtō Shimesaba Maru kenzan" (Japanese: 妖刀シメサバ丸見参)	Masaharu Amiya	November 14, 1993
31	"Flying Magic Broom"; Transliteration: "Sora Tobu Mahō no Hōki" (Japanese: 空とぶ魔法のホウキ)	Aya Matsui	November 21, 1993
32	"I, Reiko, Will Marry You!?"; Transliteration: "Reiko Kekkon Shimasu!?" (Japanese: 令子・結婚します!?)	Masashi Noro	November 28, 1993
33	"Mannequins Are Calling You"; Transliteration: "Manekin Ningyō ga Maneku" (Japanese: マネキン人形が招く)	Nobuaki Kishima	December 5, 1993
34	"Ghostly High School"; Transliteration: "Yōkai Haisukūru" (Japanese: 妖怪ハイスクール)	Masashi Noro	December 12, 1993
Yokoshima returns to high school to discover that ghosts have taken over.
35	"The Santa Claus's Gift!"; Transliteration: "Santa no Okurimono!" (Japanese: サンタの贈りもの!)	Nobuaki Kishima	December 19, 1993
36	"Okinu's Christmas"; Transliteration: "Okinu no Kurisumasu" (Japanese: おキヌのクリスマス)	Aya Matsui	December 26, 1993
37	"The Battle of the New Year!!"; Transliteration: "Batoru Kinga Shinnen!!" (Japanese: バトル謹賀新年!!)	Nobuaki Kishima	January 9, 1994
38	"The College Examinee's Blues"; Transliteration: "Jukensei Burūsu" (Japanese: 受験生ブルース)	Masaharu Amiya	January 16, 1994
39	"Maria's Sister (Part 1 of 2)"; Transliteration: "Maria no Imōto" (Japanese: マリアの妹)	Masashi Noro	January 23, 1994
40	"Maria and Teresa (Part 2 of 2)"; Transliteration: "Maria to Teresa" (Japanese: マリアとテレサ)	Masashi Noro	January 30, 1994
41	"The Fierce Battle with The Snow Queen!"; Transliteration: "Nettō! Yuki no Joō" (Japanese: 熱闘!雪の女王)	Nobuaki Kishima	February 6, 1994
42	"Here's My Chocolate!!"; Transliteration: "Choko Agemasu!!" (Japanese: チョコあげます!!)	Juttoku Yoshida	February 13, 1994
43	"Into The Dream! (Part 1 of 2)"; Transliteration: "Yume no Naka e!" (Japanese: 夢の中へ!)	Nobuaki Kishima	February 20, 1994
44	"The Hellish Nightmare (Part 2 of 2)"; Transliteration: "Jigoku no Naitomea" (Japanese: 地獄のナイトメア)	Nobuaki Kishima	February 27, 1994
45	"With Love From Ghost Sweepers"; Transliteration: "Gōsuto Suīpā yori Ai o komete" (Japanese: GS(ゴーストスイーパー)より愛をこめて)	Masashi Noro	March 6, 1994

=== Film ===
A 60-minute anime film, produced by Toei Animation, premiered on August 20, 1994. In the film, Mikami is tasked by samurai ghost Akechi Mitsuhide to stop the most powerful vampire: Nosferatu, who killed Oda Nobunaga and took his form. Given a Spirit Stone-tipped spear, Mikami battles Nosferatu and his spider-demon servant Mori Ranmaru. After Nosferatu captures her allies, Mikami defeats him with the spear, and Akechi seals him away.

The film was released in North America by Manga Entertainment on June 25, 2002.

=== Video games ===
Reception

Review score
Publication	Score
Dengeki Super Famicom	(SFC) 7/10, 6/10, 7/10, 7/10

A video game for the Super Famicom, Ghost Sweeper Mikami: Joreishi wa Nice Body (ゴーストスイーパー GS美神 〜除霊師はナイスバディ〜, Gōsuto Suīpā GS Mikami Joreishi wa Naisu Badi), published by Banalex, was released on September 23, 1993. Another video game for the PC Engine Super CD-ROM², simply titled Ghost Sweeper Mikami , published by Banpresto, was released on July 29, 1994.

== Reception ==
In 1993, Ghost Sweeper Mikami, along with Yaiba, received the 38th Shogakukan Manga Award for the shōnen category.

Reviewing the anime series, Giancarla Ross of THEM Anime Reviews dismissed it as a shallow, inferior counterpart to Phantom Quest Corp, criticizing its characters, weak animation, and plots. While acknowledging some humor, Ross concluded the series was mediocre and overshadowed by better occult comedies.
