= List of Busou Shinki episodes =

Busou Shinki (武装神姫, Busō Shinki) is a 12-episode anime television series produced by Eight Bit and based on the female action-figure toy product line Busou Shinki by Konami. The TV series began airing in Japan on October 4, 2012, and shortly after on internet streaming services. Sentai Filmworks released the complete Blu-ray on February 14, 2017. MVM Entertainment later released the complete series on Blu-ray on April 10, 2017.

== Busou Shinki Moon Angel OVA ==
An original video animation, Busou Shinki Moon Angel, was produced by Kinema Citrus as a video game promotion. It was released online as ten downloadable installments beginning September 7, 2011. The installments were assembled into a 40-minute OVA and released on DVD and Blu-ray disc in Japan on March 15, 2012.

The first opening theme is "Labyrinth" (ラビリンス, Rabirinsu) by MIQ, the second opening theme is "Catalysis of the Mind" (孤高のカタルシス, Kokou no Katarushisu) by Nana Mitani and the ending theme is "The Weak Cross' Love" (か弱き十字架の愛, Kayowaki Juujika no Ai) by Kei.

=== Plot summary ===
Tsubasa is a young boy who dreams of becoming a Shinki master. Shinki are small robot girls which can talk, fight, and fly. On a full moon night, Tsubasa finds a damaged Shinki model and takes it home. After repairing it, he gives her the name of Kaguya. They live a happy life until the former owner of Kaguya finds her.

=== Episode list ===
| No. | Title | Original release date |
|---|---|---|
| 1 | "Armament God Princess" | March 15, 2012 |
Scene opens at night with a white shinki (Kaguya) and a dark shinki (Strarf) in an aerial battle with each other above the city. The white shinki is shot down and crashes on the top of a truck driving down a rural road. The white shinki attempts to stand and reveals a deep wound in her chest. She loses consciousness and collapses from her injuries. The scene changes to the boy Tsubasa who is dreaming of becoming a master of a shinki and staring longingly at the shinki figurines through a store window. Meanwhile the lifeless white shinki falls off the truck and is carried away by crows who finally drop her up in a tree. Tsubasa is walking home when he sees the small figure up in a tree, gleaming. He climbs the tree and gently retrieves the small lifeless shinki. The scene changes to an ominous dark room where a male silhouette is shown asking Strarf "a shinki to actually defy orders, be sure to bring her back". Strarf acknowledges with "yes master". Next scene is Tsubasa's bedroom where he is attempting to revive the white shinki with software downloaded from his computer. At first this seems unsuccessful but the figure slowly regains consciousness, but without any memories. He names her Kaguya and this imprints him as her new master. He repairs the physical damage to her and her armor as she joyfully learns simple things about the world. Meanwhile, the Strarf is shown with a pile of lifeless Arnval style shinki, stating "This is not her. Where are you?" The next morning Tsubasa takes Kaguya to Ken's hobby shop and he is told about a criminal that is destroying shinki in the area. Tsubasa enters Kaguya in a video game-like contest against another shinki at an arcade. Kaguya wins the match but loses control afterward damaging and almost destroying the other shinki and the venue. The crowd turns on her but she escapes the arcade and is confronted by Strarf. The two battle but during the battle Kaguya's armor turns from white to black revealing to Strarf that Kaguya is the dark Arnval type 01 she seeks. This so startles Kaguya that she surrenders to Strarf who takes her back to the institute. Meanwhile Ken explains to Tsubasa about the institute and the origin of Kaguya. They decide to rescue her from the institute. They arrive as chaos erupts with Kaguya who has turned dark, has again lost control and is shooting the place up. Tsubasa grabs her, stops her rampage and she changes color back to white. But the chaos has freed the institute's new giant gynoid robot named Athena. The institute workers identify her as incomplete, very dangerous, out of control and equipped with military grade armor. Athena calls to Strarf who then enters Athena's chest by compulsion and makes Athena fully operational. However Kaguya realizes this is a mistake and battles Athena eventually destroying her and freeing Strarf who she protects and regards as a younger "sister". The episode ends in Ken's hobby shop with Ken in a wheelchair and with a broken arm from the battle at the institute. He is being helped by Tsubasa, Kaguya and even Strarf happy and busy at work.

== Busou Shinki TV series ==
Busou Shinki (武装神姫, Busō Shinki) is a 12-episode anime television series produced by Eight Bit and based on the Busou Shinki toy product line by Konami. The TV series uses character designs and animation derived from the video games and the preceding Busou Shinki Moon Angel ONA series. The TV series began airing in Japan on October 4, 2012. The TV series was licensed in North America by Sentai Filmworks in 2012 and began streaming on The Anime Network with episodes posted shortly after they were broadcast in Japan.

The opening theme is "Install x Dream" by Kana Asumi, Kaori Mizuhashi, Megumi Nakajima and Minori Chihara, whilst the ending theme is "The Sun's Sign" (太陽のサイン, Taiyō no Sain) by Azusa.

=== Plot summary ===
High school freshman Rihito, who comes back from abroad, starts a new life in Japan with his four Busou Shinki, female action figures with weapons.

=== Episode list ===
| No. | Title | Original release date |
|---|---|---|
| 1 | "We Found Something Important."; Transliteration: "Taisetsumono Mitskemashita." (Japanese: 大切なもの見つけました。) | October 4, 2012 |
A boy and his Arnval Shinki, nicknamed Ann, move to his hometown in Japan to start high school. As Ann helps unpack her master's things whilst he is at school, his other Shinki, Ines and Lene, help her out and discover a box labelled 'Important'. After tidying up the place, they inadvertently send a knife flying into the 'Important' box and decide to check the contents, finding a love letter inside. When the wind suddenly blows the letter away, the Shinki chase after it as it knocks over another Shinki named Kurara, who takes it as a challenge and forces them into a battlefield. When the letter becomes slightly damaged as a result of the battle, Ann becomes angry and overwhelms Kurara in battle before heading back home. After their master returns from school, Ann apologizes for what happened to the letter, which is revealed to contain a visualizer containing a house he made for Ann when he was little. Later, they discover another box containing a Strarf model Shinki.
| 2 | "The Secret Ingredient Smells Like Gunpowder"; Transliteration: "Kakushi Aji wa Shōen no Kaori" (Japanese: 隠し味は硝煙の香り) | October 11, 2012 |
The Strarf unit, which was a surprise gift from the master's father, is named Hina. As Hina becomes wary of a presence nearby, she becomes downhearted when she learns her master isn't all that into battling. Later that night, Ann suggests to Ines and Lene that they prepare a feast for their master's high school entrance gift. However, things start to get messy when a pair of cat-type Shinki start interfering. Things soon get suspenseful when the fuse shorts out and the Shinki find themselves attacked by a live octopus. Luckily, Hina comes in to save the day, stopping the octopus and fighting back the perpetrators whilst managing to get dinner ready in the process.
| 3 | "Clash! Battle Trike"; Transliteration: "Gekitotsu! Batoru Toraiku" (Japanese: 激突! バトルストライク) | October 18, 2012 |
Kurara shows up at the Shinkis' home asking for their assistance in catching a thief that has been stealing Shinki units. As Hina decides to accompany her, they tail a suspicious person to a Shinki store. Meanwhile, the master is taken in for questioning, prompting Ann, Ines and Lene to set off in order to clear his name. Noticing he is being watched, the suspicious person activates two Shinki, Ach and Yda, against Hina and Kurara. As Ines and Lene chase after the thief, Ann goes to assist Hina in fighting Ach and Yda. The battle is soon put to a halt when Ach and Yda learn that their master is the true thief who manipulated them into fighting for him. As Ach and Yda head off on a journey to find a more suitable master, the thief is brought to justice and the master's charges are dropped.
| 4 | "It's a Race! One Lap Around the Park"; Transliteration: "Rēsu da yo! Kōen Isshū" (Japanese: レースだヨ! 公園一周) | October 25, 2012 |
Lene and Ines are on the outs, and their Master has the itch to travel. A race around the park promises a trip to Okinawa for the winning Shinki and their Master, and Ines along with Lene enter...as well as few surprise entrants too.
| 5 | "Seaside Swimsuit Armor"; Transliteration: "Nagisa no Mizugi Āmā" (Japanese: 渚の水着アーマー) | November 1, 2012 |
Ann and the rest of the Shinki prepare for a trip to Okinawa with their Master...who unfortunately leaves them behind while running late. The girls then decide to make their way to the small island in search of fun and sun.
| 6 | "Attention Please! This Plane is Experiencing a Descent into Hell"; Transliteration: "Atenshon Purīzu! Tōki ha Jigoku he Mairimasu" (Japanese: アテンションプリーズ！ 当機は地獄へ参ります) | November 8, 2012 |
While on a return trip from Okinawa, the Ann & Co. encounter a trio of Shinkis who have hijacked the plane and are sending it on a one way trip to hell.
| 7 | "The Visitor That Comes With The Rain..."; Transliteration: "Hōmonsha ha Ameon Totomoni..." (Japanese: 訪問者は雨音と共に...) | November 15, 2012 |
Seeking a cool place to relax, the Shinkis inexplicably end up huddling around a room full of candles, telling horror stories in hopes of scaring the heat away. As the weather suddenly shifts to a downpour, the Shinkis go out searching for their master and encounter something not of this world...or so they think.
| 8 | "One Day, Somewhere"; Transliteration: "Aru Hi Dokokade" (Japanese: ある日どこかで) | November 22, 2012 |
One day, Ann wakes up as a human. When Rihito sees her pouting in the park, he decides to do the gentlemanly thing and help her out. Meanwhile, Ann's Shinki body has been infected by a potentially fatal virus!
| 9 | "Lene's Underground Empire Wars"; Transliteration: "Rēne no Chika Teikoku Wōzu" (Japanese: レーネの地下帝国ウォーズ) | November 29, 2012 |
The evil Shinki Cloudy rules the underground empire that is home to rogue Shinki. Lene swears that she will help the Liberation Army fight for freedom... while searching for her master's missing rice ball.
| 10 | "A Christmas Song For You"; Transliteration: "Kurisumasu Songu o Kimi ni" (Japanese: クリスマスソングを君に) | December 6, 2012 |
Christmas time is finally here, and the Shinki's decide to get part-time jobs so they can buy their Master some wonderful presents.
| 11 | "Tonight's The Night! Who's The Strongest Shinki!?"; Transliteration: "Konya Kettei! Saikyō Shinki wa Dareda!?" (Japanese: 今夜決定！最強神姫は誰だ！？) | December 13, 2012 |
Hina has been acting strange lately. The time to send her back to her Maker is close at hand, and the others think this may be why she's not herself lately. If it's true, then a battle must commence to decide who is the strongest before she departs!
| 12 | "Don't Say Goodbye"; Transliteration: "Sayonara wa Iwanaide" (Japanese: さよならは言わないで) | December 20, 2012 |
The Shinkis are scrambling to get to Hina, who is about to go back to her Maker. They must find her before it's too late, or they may never see her again.
