= Psychic Squad =

Japanese manga series

- First tankōbon volume cover, featuring (from left to right) Aoi Nogami, Kaoru Akashi and Shiho Sannomiya

絶対可憐チルドレン (Zettai Karen Chirudoren)
- Genre: Sci-fi comedy; Supernatural
- Manga
- Written by: Takashi Shiina
- Published by: Shogakukan
- Imprint: Shōnen Sunday Comics
- Magazine: Weekly Shōnen Sunday
- Original run: July 13, 2005 – July 14, 2021
- Volumes: 63
- Anime television series
- Directed by: Keiichiro Kawaguchi
- Written by: Satoru Nishizono
- Music by: Kōtarō Nakagawa
- Studio: SynergySP
- Licensed by: NA: Sentai Filmworks
- Original network: TV Tokyo
- Original run: April 6, 2008 – March 29, 2009
- Episodes: 51 + OVA
- Light novel

Zettai Karen Children the Novels "B.A.B.E.L. Hōkai"
- Written by: Gakuto Mikumo
- Illustrated by: Takashi Shiina
- Published by: Shogakukan
- Imprint: Gagaga Bunko
- Published: May 20, 2008
- Video game

Zettai Karen Children DS: Dai-4 no Children
- Developer: HuneX
- Publisher: Konami
- Genre: Simulation RPG
- Platform: Nintendo DS
- Released: September 4, 2008
- Spin-off
- Unlimited Psychic Squad (2013)
- icon

Psychic Squad, known in Japan as Zettai Karen Children (Japanese: 絶対可憐チルドレン, Hepburn: Zettai Karen Chirudoren; lit. 'Absolutely Lovely Children'), is a Japanese manga series written and illustrated by Takashi Shiina. It was serialized in Shogakukan's shōnen manga magazine Weekly Shōnen Sunday from July 2005 to July 2021, with its chapters collected in 63 tankōbon volumes. It is the story about three young problem girls with outstanding psychic powers and a young man with no special powers at all tasked to guide them properly while dealing with all the commotions they cause, including their obvious infatuation with him.

A 51-episode anime television series produced by SynergySP was broadcast from April 2008 to March 2009, and had a special original video animation (OVA) released in July 2010. A 12-episode spin-off focused on main antagonist Kyōsuke Hyōbu, titled Unlimited Psychic Squad, and produced by Manglobe, was broadcast from January to March 2013.

By July 2012, the manga had over 6 million copies in circulation. In 2022, Psychic Squad received the 53rd Seiun Award for Best Comic.

== Plot ==
In the future, as people with ESP increase in numbers, so does the possible good and evil they can cause to society. The Japanese government establishes of the Base of Backing ESP Laboratory (B.A.B.E.L.) a special esper organization tasked with dealing with situations that can't be resolved by ordinary means, including dealing with espers engaged in criminal activity. Kōichi Minamoto, a 20-year-old prodigy is assigned by B.A.B.E.L. to the task of supervising the most powerful espers in the country, a trio of gifted but mischievous 10-year-old girls known as "The Children": Kaoru Akashi, Shiho Sannomiya, and Aoi Nogami.

As the series progresses, The Children and Minamoto must deal with several enemy organizations, each with conflicted views regarding the role of espers in the world, including "P.A.N.D.R.A.", a cadre of rogue espers determined to wage war against the rest of mankind, the "Black Phantom", a mercenary organization who brainwashes espers into living tools of destruction and the "Normal People", composed solely of non-esper individuals who view espers only as a threat to be vanquished.

== Media ==
=== Manga ===
Written and illustrated by Takashi Shiina, Zettai Karen Children was developed out of a short story he had written in Shogakukan's shōnen manga magazine Shōnen Sunday Super in 2003. A four-chapter story was then published in Weekly Shōnen Sunday in September 2004. Zettai Karen Children was serialized for 16 years in Weekly Shōnen Sunday, from July 13, 2005, (Note: It started in the magazine's 33rd issue of 2005 (cover date July 27), released on July 13 of that same year.) to July 14, 2021. Shogakukan collected its 622 individual chapters in sixty-three tankōbon volumes, released from October 18, 2005, to September 17, 2021.

==== Volumes ====
No.	Japanese release date	Japanese ISBN
1	October 18, 2005	978-4-09-127371-0
2	October 18, 2005	978-4-09-127372-7
3	January 14, 2006	978-4-09-120028-0
4	April 15, 2006	978-4-09-120127-0
5	June 16, 2006	978-4-09-120415-8
6	September 15, 2006	978-4-09-120578-0
7	December 16, 2006	978-4-09-120708-1
8	February 16, 2007	978-4-09-121010-4
9	May 18, 2007	978-4-09-121068-5
10	August 10, 2007	978-4-09-121167-5
11	November 16, 2007	978-4-09-121215-3
12	March 18, 2008	978-4-09-121302-0
13	June 23, 2008	978-4-09-121397-6
14	September 18, 2008	978-4-09-121465-2
15	December 18, 2008	978-4-09-121515-4
16	March 18, 2009	978-4-09-121598-7
17	July 17, 2009	978-4-09-122007-3
18	September 17, 2009	978-4-09-121745-5
19	December 18, 2009	978-4-09-122028-8
20	February 18, 2010	978-4-09-122148-3
21	April 26, 2010	978-4-09-122258-9
22	July 16, 2010	978-4-09-122419-4
23	October 18, 2010	978-4-09-122625-9
24	December 17, 2010	978-4-09-122719-5
25	February 18, 2011	978-4-09-122782-9
26	June 17, 2011	978-4-09-122872-7
27	September 6, 2011	978-4-09-123238-0
28	December 16, 2011	978-4-09-123430-8
29	January 18, 2012	978-4-09-123516-9
30	May 18, 2012	978-4-09-123665-4
31	August 17, 2012	978-4-09-123793-4
32	December 18, 2012	978-4-09-124034-7
33	January 18, 2013	978-4-09-124167-2
34	April 18, 2013	978-4-09-124204-4
35	August 16, 2013	978-4-09-124366-9
36	October 18, 2013	978-4-09-124457-4
37	January 17, 2014	978-4-09-124553-3
38	April 18, 2014	978-4-09-124647-9
39	July 18, 2014	978-4-09-124676-9
40	December 18, 2014	978-4-09-125414-6
41	March 18, 2015	978-4-09-125796-3
42	July 17, 2015	978-4-09-125858-8
43	September 18, 2015	978-4-09-126227-1
44	January 18, 2016	978-4-09-126497-8
45	April 18, 2016	978-4-09-127093-1
46	August 18, 2016	978-4-09-127329-1
47	December 16, 2016	978-4-09-127429-8
48	March 17, 2017	978-4-09-127510-3
49	August 18, 2017	978-4-09-127576-9
50	December 18, 2017	978-4-09-127880-7
51	April 18, 2018	978-4-09-128228-6
52	August 17, 2018	978-4-09-128348-1
53	January 18, 2019	978-4-09-128780-9
54	April 18, 2019	978-4-09-128808-0
55	August 16, 2019	978-4-09-129176-9
56	December 18, 2019	978-4-09-129453-1
57	March 18, 2020	978-4-09-129566-8
58	June 18, 2020	978-4-09-850082-6
59	September 18, 2020	978-4-09-850184-7
60	January 18, 2021	978-4-09-850289-9
61	April 16, 2021	978-4-09-850519-7
62	July 16, 2021	978-4-09-850631-6
63	September 17, 2021	978-4-09-850646-0

=== Anime ===
A 51-episode anime television series adaptation, produced by SynergySP, started airing on TV Tokyo on April 6, 2008. The anime has six pieces of theme music; two opening themes and four ending themes. The first opening theme is "Over The Future" by Karen Girl's, the first ending theme is "Zettai love×love Sengen!!" (絶対love×love宣言!!) by "The Children starring Aya Hirano, Ryoko Shiraishi and Haruka Tomatsu"; the second ending theme is "Datte Daihonmei" (DATTE大本命), also by Hirano, Shiraishi, and Tomatsu. From episode 27 onwards opening theme has changed to "MY WINGS", once again by Karen Girl's, ending theme changed to "Break+Your+Destiny" by Yuuichi Nakamura, Kishō Taniyama and Kōji Yusa and "Soushunfu" performed by Aya Hirano, Ryoko Shiraishi and Haruka Tomatsu. In episode 46 of the series, the opening theme, "MY WINGS", was sung by Aya Hirano, Ryoko Shiraishi and Haruka Tomatsu while the ending theme was "Zettai love×love Sengen!!", sung by Karen Girl's.

An original video animation (OVA) was announced in December 2009. It was released on July 16, 2010, and includes original material based on the junior high school story arc. The opening theme for the OVA is "Seventh Heaven" by The Children and the ending theme is "Out of Control" by Karen Guy's.

In January 2012, Sentai Filmworks announced that they have licensed the series. Sentai Filmworks released the series on four DVDs in Japanese with English subtitles on May 1, July 17, September 4 and November 6, 2012.

=== Video game ===
A video game for the Nintendo DS developed by Konami entitled Zettai Karen Children DS: Dai-4 no Children (絶対可憐チルドレンDS 第4のチルドレン) was released on September 4, 2008.

Kaoru Akashi appears as a fighter character in the fighting game Sunday vs Magazine: Shūketsu! Chōjō Daikessen (サンデー VS マガジン 集結！ 頂上大決戦) for Sony's PlayStation Portable. Characters Aoi, Shiho, Minamoto, Fujiko and Hyōbu also make appearances as part of special moves or as support. The game was also developed by Konami and released on March 26, 2009.

== Reception ==
By July 2012, the manga had over 6 million copies in circulation. Psychic Squad was awarded the 53rd Seiun Award in the Best Comic category in 2022.
