= Takashi Shiina =

Japanese manga artist (born 1965)

- Born: 24 June 1965 (age 61); Osaka Prefecture, Japan
- Occupation: Manga artist
- Spouse: Aya Shimizu
- Awards: 1993 Shogakukan Manga Award (Ghost Sweeper Mikami)

Takashi Shiina (椎名 高志, Shiina Takashi; born 24 June 1965) is a Japanese manga artist who writes primarily for the weekly Shogakukan manga publication Weekly Shōnen Sunday. When he started at the company in 1989, he began with an anthology of various shorts and one-shots collectively known as Shiina Department Store. Eventually one of these one-shots, about a beautiful, money grubbing female exorcist and her lecherous companion, would become the basis of his best known work: Ghost Sweeper Mikami: Gokuraku Daisakusen!! (better known by its shorter name: Ghost Sweeper Mikami, or GS Mikami) Running from 1991 through 1999, it became well known and popular work in Sunday, leading to an anime of the series from 1993 through 1994 by Toei Animation as well as a Shogakukan Manga Award for shōnen in 1993. Even as he had success with Mikami, Shiina continued to create various one-shot stories on the side of his main series.

After the end of GS Mikami, Shiina tried to create new series for the manga anthology, such as Ichiban-yu no Kanata and Mister Japan. He also created new series and shorts on the side, including GS Holmes: Gokuraku Daisakusen!! (an alternate take on Sherlock Holmes co-starring the robotic Maria from GS Mikami) In 2003, Shiina introduced another of his many ideas in Shōnen Sunday in short form: Zettai Karen Children, about three young girls with great psychic powers and terrifying ambitions. Finding some success with it in short form, the manga artist introduced it as a weekly series in 2005, where it continued to run in Weekly Shōnen Sunday until June 2021.

== Works ==
- Bouken! Mahou Shoujo Mami chan (1989–1990)
- Shiina Department Store (1991)
- Ghost Sweeper Mikami (1991–1999)
- Mister Japan (2000)
- Ichiban-yu no Kanata (2002)
- GS Holmes Gokuraku Taisakusen!! (2004)
- Zettai Karen Children (2005–2021)
- Yashahime: Princess Half-Demon (2021–2025)
