= List of Saki episodes =

The cover of the first Japanese DVD compilation released by Pony Canyon on July 15, 2009

The Saki animated television series is based on the manga of the same name written and illustrated by Ritz Kobayashi. The episodes were produced by the animation studios Gonzo and Picture Magic, directed by Manabu Ono, and written by Tatsuhiko Urahata. The story follows the titular character Saki Miyanaga, a skilled mahjong player who joins her high school's mahjong club despite previously hating the game. There, she makes friends with other mahjong players and heads into the world of competitive mahjong. The episodes aired in Japan between April 6 and September 28, 2009, on TV Tokyo and concluded with 25 episodes. The first DVD compilation volume was released on July 15, 2009, by Pony Canyon. The DVD release also included seven picture drama episodes.

An anime television adaptation of Saki Achiga-hen episode of Side-A, a side-story manga written by Kobayashi and illustrated by Aguri Igarashi, was produced by Studio Gokumi and directed by Ono. The story follows Nodoka Haramura's former classmate, Shizuno Takakamo, who revives her school's mahjong club so they can reach the national championships and see Nodoka again. The 12-episode series aired in Japan between April 9 and July 2, 2012, and was simulcast by Crunchyroll. Four additional episodes aired between December 2012 and May 2013. A third season, Saki: The Nationals, also produced by Studio Gokumi, aired 13 episodes between January 5 and April 6, 2014. All of the series are simulcast by Crunchyroll. An original video animation based on Saya Kiyoshi's Saki Biyori gag manga was released on July 25, 2015.

Five pieces of theme music are used for Saki; two opening themes and three ending themes. The opening theme for episodes one through fourteen is "Glossy:MMM" by Miyuki Hashimoto, while episodes fifteen onwards use "Bloooomin'" by Little Non. The first ending theme used in most of the first fourteen episodes is "Netsuretsu Kangei Wonderland" (熱烈歓迎わんだーらんど) by Kana Ueda, Ami Koshimizu, Rie Kugimiya, Ryōko Shiraishi, and Shizuka Itō. The second ending theme, used for episodes 7, 10, 16, 18 and 22, is "Zankoku na Negai no Naka de" (残酷な願いの中で) by Ueda and Koshimizu. The third ending theme, used for episodes fifteen onwards is "Shikakui Uchū de Matteru yo" (四角い宇宙で待ってるよ) by Ueda, Koshimizu, Kugimiya, Shiraishi and Itō. For Saki Achiga-hen episode of Side-A, the opening theme is "Miracle Rush" by StylipS, while the ending themes are "Square Panic Serenade" performed by Aoi Yūki, Nao Tōyama, Kana Hanazawa, Mako and Yumi Uchiyama and "Futuristic Player" by Miyuki Hashimoto. For the extra episodes, the opening theme is "Tsu Ba Sa" by SylipS. For Saki: The Nationals, the opening theme is "New Sparks!" by Hashimoto, and the ending themes are "True Gate", performed by Hashimoto, and "Kono Te ga Kiseki o Eranderu " (この手が奇跡を選んでる, This Hand Will Draw a Miracle), which is performed by voice actresses from the show and varies between episodes.

== Saki (2009) ==
This season of Saki featured the Kiyosumi girls' campaign to qualify for the National mahjong tournament in the Nagano prefecture. As the Kiyosumi team qualified one tournament level after another, they meet and play various other schools along the way, notably perennial school Kazekoshi, the current prefectural champion Ryūmonbuchi, and a relatively unknown school Tsuruga in the prefectural final.

| No. | Title | Original release date |
|---|---|---|
| 1 | "Encounter"; Transliteration: "Deai" (Japanese: 出会い) | April 6, 2009 |
Saki Miyanaga, a girl with a dislike of mahjong due to frictional history with her family, is invited by her friend, Kyōtarō Suga, to check out Kiyosumi High School's mahjong club, playing a game alongside fellow members Nodoka Haramura and Yūki Kataoka. When club president Hisa Takei wakes up, she discovers Saki has the ability to finish with a +-0 score consistently across multiple games. When asked about this by Nodoka, Saki explains she often aims for that score so that she wouldn't be punished by her family for either winning or losing, claiming to hate mahjong herself. The next day, Hisa manages to rope Saki into playing another game, this time with the club's other member, Mako Someya, with Saki once again managing to score +-0 using a rinshan kaihō.
| 2 | "Battle"; Transliteration: "Shōbu" (Japanese: 勝負) | April 13, 2009 |
In her next game, Saki is asked to play under the assumption that she is beginning with a handicapped score. As Saki manages to obtain a +-0 score under these conditions, it is revealed that, since actual mahjong games doesn't utilise handicaps, she is actually the winner of the match. While Nodoka feels rejected over losing to someone who supposedly hates the game, Saki starts to get a rekindled appreciation of the game. After finding her old mahjong table and talking with her father, Saki decides to officially join Kiyosumi's mahjong club so she can play and win more games.
| 3 | "Confrontation"; Transliteration: "Tairitsu" (Japanese: 対立) | April 20, 2009 |
A week has passed since Saki joined the club and Nodoka has remained distant to her, having failed to replicate her consistent +-0 playstyle in her online games. Later, Nodoka becomes irritated with Saki when she reverts to her old playstyle in order to let Yuki win a game following a losing streak. As Nodoka states she wants everyone to play at their best, Saki, wanting to once again meet her older sister, Teru, befriends Nodoka and makes a promise to go to the national mahjong tournament together. With this in mind, Hisa and Mako register their club for the Nagano Prefectural Tournament.
| 4 | "Beat-down"; Transliteration: "Honrō" (Japanese: 翻弄) | April 27, 2009 |
Hisa explains the details concerning the prefectural tournament, with Yūki pointing out the previous champions, Ryūmonbuchi High School, and their top player, Amae Koromo. Later, Hisa has Saki and Nodoka work at Mako's family's maid café, during which they play various mahjong games against customers. Despite winning against a few customers, Saki and Nodoka are completely beaten by a woman named Yasuko Fujita, who is later revealed to be a professional mahjong player and an acquaintance of Hisa's. As Hisa reveals the purpose of Fujita's visit was to instill fear and motivation into Saki and Nodoka, she announces plans for a mahjong training camp.
| 5 | "Training Camp"; Transliteration: "Gasshuku" (Japanese: 合宿) | May 4, 2009 |
The mahjong club goes to a mountain retreat for mahjong training camp, spending the first day having fun. The next day, Hisa puts each of the players through special regimes, having Saki learn how to play mahjong online whilst training Nodoka to work with actual tiles and Yuki works with her math skills. As the players put their training to practice, Hisa explains how she was once the sole member of the mahjong club, patiently waiting until new members joined her. The next day, Yūki, Nodoka and Saki go to see the nearby waterfall.
| 6 | "The Tournament Begins"; Transliteration: "Kaimaku" (Japanese: 開幕) | May 11, 2009 |
After arriving at the tournament area, Saki gets separated from her friends; and the current national middle school champion, Nodoka, is hounded by reporters. On the other hand, Saki crosses paths with the members of Ryūmonbuchi (minus Koromo). As they pass each other, the Ryūmonbuchi team senses a familiar aura flowing from Saki, an aura similar to that of Koromo. They initially mistake her for Nodoka, until Tōka indicates otherwise. A couple more steps and Saki suddenly trips, and Jun muses that there is no way another mahjong player of Koromo's level could possibly exist. After Saki rejoins the group, Hisa reveals the player order: Yūki, Mako, herself, Nodoka, and Saki. Competition begins with Kiyosumi initially underestimated, Yūki wins many hands and dominates. Afterwards, Mako and Hisa also make quick work of their opponents, ending with a commanding lead. For Nodoka's round, she draws the attention of a large audience.
| 7 | "Tradition"; Transliteration: "Dentō" (Japanese: 伝統) | May 18, 2009 |
Nodoka walks into her match holding her stuffed penguin, which stirs the observers and her own opponents. Nodoka plays a questionable game; but then Nodoka gains momentum. This prompted Tōka to connect the similarities between her gameplay and a famous skilled online mahjong player, Nodocchi. She tries telling this to her teammates, but they remained skeptical. Off-scene, Saki quickly finishes her match by running out one of the players, and the team advances onward. In the semi-finals, Saki's team makes it through to the finals, along with Ryūmonbuchi, Kazekoshi, and Tsuruga Academy. One of the Kazekoshi members, Kana Ikeda, gets harsh treatment from their coach for playing below her expectations. The captain of the team, Mihoko Fukuji protects Kana. After the coach leaves, the captain reminds her teammates about the vow to defeat Ryūmonbuchi, after hearing the rival school's semi-final result.
| 8 | "The Night Before"; Transliteration: "Zen'ya" (Japanese: 前夜) | May 25, 2009 |
The final four teams are featured looking forward to the finals match. The Kiyosumi team returns home to town on a late night train, due to lack of funding for a hotel stay. Hisa reveals to Mako about motivation to retain the club between the two the previous year. Hisa had to participate in the prefectural tournament with a full team, rather than compete individually. Nodoka recounts to Saki about her online play, due to the lack of players; but after entering middle school she participated in the team and solo competition of the middle school tournament, though only Nodoka advanced. The girls from Kazekoshi talk about how their captain, Mihoko, does most of the club work; and since it is her last year, they want to play their best to qualify for the national tournament. Tōka dispatches her butler, Hagiyoshi, to bring Koromo to the tournament, who had been sleeping all day. By morning, the Kiyosumi team heads back to the tournament.
| 9 | "Eyes Open"; Transliteration: "Kaigan" (Japanese: 開眼) | June 1, 2009 |
Before the final's vanguard match begins, Ryūmonbuchi representative Jun Inoue accidentally eats Yūki's only taco. Yūki cries and causes a commotion, but Mihoko shares her lunch box with her. Then the game begins with Jun winning multiple hands, while manipulating the game flow and pressures Yūki. Midway, Mihoko opens her right eye to use her power: deduction of tile discards. She negates Jun's influence and proceeds to help Yūki gain her points back from Jun to turn the game around. Jun gets irritated over the two teaming up against her, while Yūki assumes Mihoko as her ally. However, Mihoko takes control of the game with her own sudden string of wins; and both finally, Jun and Yūki realize that she is the true enemy. The first round ends with Mihoko completely dominating the game points for the Kazekoshi team.
| 10 | "Beginner"; Transliteration: "Shoshinsha" (Japanese: 初心者) | June 8, 2009 |
Hisa suggests Saki and Nodoka to take a nap before their matches; and while Nodoka initially declines, she accepts in order to allow Yūki to cry without the presence of her peers. Mako's turn comes up and plays with her glasses off; Hisa explains this allows Mako to compare discard patterns with past matches. However, this power soon becomes useless, as one of her opponents is Kaori Senoo, a timid beginner. Surprisingly, the beginner wins with some very lucky hands, one of which is a yakuman. The round ends with Mako in last place. A very confident Koromo arrives and gets teased by Fujita. Two first round opponents steal Nodoka's penguin but drop it when spotted. Seeing the penguin, Koromo decides to return it. The team standings reasserts Hisa's determination. Mihoko recognizes Hisa, who mysteriously disappeared in the middle of a middle school tournament; and recalling Hisa's play style, she fears for her teammate.
| 11 | "Prank"; Transliteration: "Itazura" (Japanese: 悪戯) | June 15, 2009 |
In the lieutenant match, Hisa utilizes her strategy of using illogical bad waits with strong defensive play to throw off her opponents' thinking. Also, Hisa recalls her debate with Nodoka regarding superstitious and logical play. Hajime Kunihiro counters with a large hand of her own while avoiding her sleight-of-hand habit, which disqualified her in an elementary school competition. Meanwhile, Nodoka wakes to find that her penguin is missing and leaves Saki to go look for it. The two students who originally stole it encounter Koromo with carrying the penguin. They tried to take the penguin from her, but a wing rips off. That left Koromo crying. During the break, Mihoko rushes to the main hall to inform her teammate about Hisa's tactics. In turn, she encounters Hisa face-to-face for the first time in years.
| 12 | "Awakening"; Transliteration: "Mezame" (Japanese: 目醒め) | June 22, 2009 |
In the main hall, Mihoko recalls her last interaction with Hisa, but Hisa doesn't recognize her. Mihoko advises her teammate. A crying Koromo takes the torn penguin to the Ryūmonbuchi room, where Hagiyoshi fixes it. Enthusiastically, she returns it to Nodoka. While Nodoka expresses her gratitude, an announcement prompts her to leaves quickly; and Koromo is unable to make introductions. The match continues into the second half with Hisa's trademark style. Trying to compare Hisa with Koromo, Hajime recalls the circumstances behind her attendance to Ryūmonbuchi. In addition, she functions as Tōka's personal maid; and Tōka has her play Koromo, with a chance to be set free. Hajime disregards the comparison, and the third match ends with very close team scores. Before the start of the fourth match, Saki awakens just in time to wish Nodoka good luck.
| 13 | "Light Fever"; Transliteration: "Binetsu" (Japanese: 微熱) | June 29, 2009 |
The vice-captain match begins off slow with steady defensive play. As play continues, the rounds end as draws or low scoring plays. Reading Nodoka's play style, Tōka reconfirms Nodoka as her online rival, Nodocchi. Eventually, Nodoka plays her online style, while remembering training camp; and she takes over the game tempo. After several rounds, only Nodoka has won any hands and has pulled ahead. Plus, any of Tōka's efforts to attain a win has been stifled, and this irritates her. At the same time, she gets fired up against Nodoka, where she perceives this match as a personal duel between the two. Meanwhile, Koromo recounts to Hagiyoshi about her opponents' despair from the strength of her mahjong play; and as a result, she remains isolated because of it.
| 14 | "Existence"; Transliteration: "Sonzai" (Japanese: 存在) | July 6, 2009 |
Tōka increases her intensity and scores a large hand, ruining Nodoka's perfect run. However, her glory is short-lived after falling into a play laid by Tsuruga's Momoko Tōyoko, with a technique called "stealth mode". This ends the first half. Momoko's small presence renders her virtually "invisible" during mahjong play. Her background involved abandonment of all communication, until her school's mahjong club leader, Yumi Kajiki, found her in search of a fifth player to the club. Yumi left an impression on Momoko; and thus, she changed her views about communication. The match resumes; and again, Tōka uncharacteristically plays into Momoko's hand, shocking herself and those watching the match.
| 15 | "Demon"; Transliteration: "Mamono" (Japanese: 魔物) | July 13, 2009 |
Momoko looks to continue her abilities; but Nodoka stops her. Nodoka's combination of online style and her personality renders her immune to Momoko's "stealth mode". Hisa notes the change in Nodoka from the training camp sessions. The round ends with Kiyosumi retaining the lead and Tōka in disappointment. The captains match starts with Saki, Kana, Yumi and Koromo. Initially, Saki feels Koromo's fearsome aura when she enters the building. Yet, she doesn't match the aura to Koromo, as she cutely heads to the game table. As the game kicks off, Saki shocks the table with her own powerful presence, scoring two rinshan kaihō moves in a row. However, Yumi targets Saki with a chankan to halt the game's momentum. Yumi admits that the play was mostly luck with the intention to inject some fear into Saki.
| 16 | "Conspiracy"; Transliteration: "Kettaku" (Japanese: 結託) | July 20, 2009 |
As the round continues, Saki becomes fearful; and Koromo reveals her aura. Then she controls the game by reducing her opponents' tenpai probabilities and playing two haitei raoyue moves in a row. However, Yumi gives Saki a win off her discard and breaks Koromo's control. Then Yumi changes up her game and follows up with a score off of Kana. However, Koromo unveils a different aura and changes up with fast high scoring play. The first half ends with Koromo in the lead, and everyone fearing her abilities.
| 17 | "Nightmare"; Transliteration: "Akumu" (Japanese: 悪夢) | July 27, 2009 |
During the break, Mihoko comforts a despairing Kana in the game room; and Nodoka meets up with Saki to reaffirm their promise and to rebuild her confidence. Fujita warns Koromo to play mahjong properly. The second half resumes. Koromo continues her game control, but Saki remains resolute. Koromo targets Kana; and in one particular play, Koromo deliberately lowers her scoring hand to bring Kana's score down to exactly zero points, instead of running out Kana. She intends to crush their spirits, but Saki is unfazed. The game continues, but the scoring creates an extremely tough condition: the final match end and Koromo wins when points are taken from Kana. Saki's pulls out of this bind with an intentional chankan play and gives Kana points out of this danger zone. Seeing this, Koromo has difficulty contemplating Saki's daring move.
| 18 | "Link"; Transliteration: "Tsunagari" (Japanese: 繋がり) | August 3, 2009 |
Remembering the pact she had made with Mihoko, Kana regains a fiery burst of confidence and fights back with a kazoe-yakuman. Yumi also gets a good play; and Koromo gets a little agitated, after paying too much attention to Saki. Saki feels a bit off and decides to go barefeet, remembering her mahjong games at home and at the training camp. Then she develops momentum using consecutive very low-scoring plays, bewildering her opponents and watchers. Suddenly, she builds a high scoring hand from "nothing", which bypassed Koromo's senses. Saki brings Kiyosumi's score closer to the lead; and Koromo inquires to Saki about whether she can win. Saki replies about the hope to be back in a happy family, a word that shakes Koromo up.
| 19 | "Friends"; Transliteration: "Tomodachi" (Japanese: 友達) | August 10, 2009 |
Koromo recalls the loneliness after the death of her parents. Tōka brought her friends; but she still always felt lonely, believing mahjong is her only worth. The despair in Koromo's powers causes a brief blackout. The match continues with a determined Kana; but Koromo scores another haitei raoyue, ending Saki's turn as dealer. In the final hand, everyone aims for high value hands to clinch the win. Kana develops a double yakuman but declines the points; and Koromo draws an unexpected tile and hesitates. Saki remarks about her enjoyment of the game against her; and Koromo proceeds to discard the surprising drawn tile. Saki eventually scores against Koromo with a highly improbable kazoe-yakuman using a chain of dead wall draws and wins the tournament, thus qualifying Kiyosumi in the nationals. In the end, Koromo is relieved to find people who enjoy playing mahjong with her.
| 20 | "Sisters"; Transliteration: "Shimai" (Japanese: 姉妹) | August 17, 2009 |
As a reward for winning the tournament, and to train for the individuals, Hisa takes everyone to a pool, where Saki admits she cannot swim. They run into the Ryūmonbuchi group, who actually owns the pool. Just as Tōka snarks at her rival Nodoka, Koromo finally makes friends with her. Tōka reminds Koromo about a past trip to Tokyo at a family restaurant, that reminded her of her parents. Meanwhile, Kazekoshi and Tsuruga trains for the individuals. Saki's sister, Teru, progresses to the nationals.
| 21 | "Looking Back"; Transliteration: "Tsuisō" (Japanese: 追想) | August 24, 2009 |
The individuals tournament begins with each match as single east rounds. Tōka faces off against Tsuruga's Kaori and is beaten by her beginner's luck. Another Tsuruga girl informs her teammates about a strong opponent during south winds. Other players target the Kiyosumi players, as team champions. On the other hand, Kyōtarō is eliminated early from the boys tournament. In the second half, Mihoko ends up facing against Hisa, who still does not remember her. With Hisa ahead, Mihoko opens her right eye to use her power and win the game. During the duel, Hisa finally remembers her; and Mihoko finally gets her long awaited conversation. The first day ends with all of Kiyosumi's players progressing. Favoring east rounds, Yūki leads the standings and psyches herself up for the next day.
| 22 | "Promise"; Transliteration: "Yakusoku" (Japanese: 約束) | September 7, 2009 |
It is the final day of the individuals, and Yūki is surprised to find the matches composed of east-south rounds. She starts strongly in her first match; but when the south wind approaches, the Hirataki High School player, Kazue Nanpo, takes over the game and wins. During the day's break, Nodoka sees Saki placed 29th with scores of consistent plus minus zero; and she confronts her about it. Saki explains that it was Hisa's only chance at the individuals, but Nodoka reminds her of the promise to play at her fullest. Saki ends up in a match against Hisa, as well as Momoko and Tomoki. Hisa immediately concocts a strategy to contain Saki's rinshan kaihō strategy, which eventually convinces the others to gang up on her. Later on, determined to avenge Yumi's earlier loss against Saki during the team tournament, Momoko targets Tomoki with her stealth ability.
| 23 | "Determination"; Transliteration: "Honki" (Japanese: 本気) | September 14, 2009 |
Momoko continues to put the pressure on Tomoki and Hisa keeps racking up strong plays, while Saki is still unable to use her usual strategy. Saki remembers her training using online gaming and uses that skill to pick out Momoko's tiles. This finally allows her to play a rinshan kaihō to win the match. In the final matches, Hisa goes against Mihoko, Tōka and Yumi; Nodoka goes against Kana, Jun and Hajime; Yūki goes against Mako, Tomoki and Momoko; and Saki goes against Kazue, Kanbara, and Miharu. As everyone battles their hardest, Miharu fends off Saki in the east wind round; but in the south round, Kazue makes her moves. However, Saki counters Kazue and pulls out two rinshan kaihō moves to win her match, to place third, and to qualify for the nationals. Nodoka wins her match and qualifies second. Hisa wins her match but earned not enough points to qualify, and Mihoko is first place overall.
| 24 | "Summer Festival"; Transliteration: "Natsumatsuri" (Japanese: 夏祭り) | September 21, 2009 |
Kyōtarō tells Saki about an upcoming summer festival; and he invites the rest of the club. Hisa sends invitations to the other finals schools to join them for Kiyosumi's nationals training camp. Yūki flunks her math midterm and must take a makeup test, where failure will make her unable to attend the camp. Therefore, Saki and Nodoka help her study. Hisa prohibits them from using the club room, forcing them to find other places to study. Ryūmonbuchi and Tsuruga send their responses for the camp, while Mihoko delivers hers to Hisa personally. After Yūki's makeup test, the club members go to the festival, and Hisa watches from afar with Mihoko. Yūki passes her makeup test, and all the schools go to the training camp.
| 25 | "Nationals"; Transliteration: "Zenkoku" (Japanese: 全国) | September 28, 2009 |
At the training camp, they try to hold a meeting; but instead, they split up for leisure time. Yumi gives Hisa some national school team data, while everyone else spends their free time. The next morning, some of the girls gather in the onsen and discuss the national powerhouses, including Saki's sister. Hisa confirmed her suspicion of Saki's relation to Teru, from Saki's reaction when confronted her of this fact. Mihoko informs about Teru's denial, and Saki leaves the onsen feeling distraught. Nodoka takes her to a shrine to cheer her up. There, they exchange souvenirs and chooses to refers each other by their given names as a sign of familiarity. When they return to camp, Hisa greets them and leads the two into the training starts in a room, where everyone are already seated and ready to play. In addition, Fujita attends the camp.

== Saki Achiga-hen episode of Side-A (2012) ==
One of Nodoka's various school transfers influenced a group of girls in the Nara region to form a team and compete in the National mahjong tournament. Together, these five girls revive the defunct Achiga Girls Academy mahjong club. Aided by a former member of the prefectural champion team, Harue Akado, the team trains and battles their way to the National semi-final, with the hope of making the finals and playing Nodoka again.

| No. | Title | Original release date |
|---|---|---|
| 1 | "Chance meeting" Transliteration: "Kaikō" (Japanese: 邂逅) | April 9, 2012 |
After transferring into an elementary school in Nara, Nodoka makes friends with Shizuno Takakamo and Ako Atarashi. Upon hearing about her interest in mahjong, they take Nodoka to Achiga Girl's Academy, where Harue Akado runs a mahjong club for children. After a few games with Kuro Matsumi, Shizuno later tells Nodoka about Harue's history, including reasons leading to Achiga's club disbanding. By the year's end, Harue accepts an offer to join a company's mahjong team, which leads to the closure of the children's club. As Ako goes to a separate middle school from the others, Nodoka also reveals that she is transferring out by the next spring. The years have passed, and an excited third year Shizuno sees Nodoka on television winning the individual middle school tournament. Driven to reach the inter-high national tournament, Shizuno goes to Achiga's club room where she encounters Kuro, who had been maintaining the room since disbandment. As they decide to revive the mahjong club with intent to meet Nodoka again, Ako, who had originally planned to join Bansei High School, decides to enrol into Achiga for the same reason.
| 2 | "Beginning"; Transliteration: "Shidō" (Japanese: 始動) | April 16, 2012 |
Kuro takes Shizuno and Ako to meet her older sister, Yū, who becomes the fourth mahjong club member. The next day, Kuro asks her classmate, Arata Sagimori, a fan of Harue during her prime, and she joins as the fifth member. During the winter, Harue's company mahjong team had become defunct, leaving Harue downhearted. As she visits Achiga for some nostalgia, she is surprised to find Shizuno and the others playing. Wanting to experience the inter-high nationals once more, Harue decides to become the club's advisor and coach. With the mahjong club officially reformed, the girls begin training for the prefectural preliminaries. Later in the evening, Ako encounters some of her former classmates who went on to attend prefectural rival Bansei High.
| 3 | "Contact"; Transliteration: "Sesshoku" (Japanese: 接触) | April 23, 2012 |
At the prefectural tournament, the Achiga team defeats Bansei in the first round and eventually qualifies for the nationals. To train for the nationals, Harue schedules the club to play against prefectural runners-up. Immediately, Shizno utters "Nagano", Kiyosumi's prefecture, as the first one to visit, and therefore, they play Ryūmonbuchi High. There, Koromo Amae overwhelmingly defeats Shizuno but doesn't discourage her or the team. Then, the excited team proceeds to defeat other schools at other prefectures. After a ten-day training camp, the girls set off for the nationals. While stopping at a rest stop, Shizuno and the others meet Toki Onjōji and Ryuuka Shimizudani from Senriyama Girl's High, who are also seeded in the nationals. As the club finally reaches the nationals, they briefly walk pass Saki Miyanaga.
| 4 | "Nationals"; Transliteration: "Zenkoku" (Japanese: 全国) | April 30, 2012 |
As the Achiga girls receive results of the drawing lottery, they find that they are on the opposite side of Kiyosumi while on the same side as the top-ranked Shiraitodai High School. As the girls do some research on their opponents, Harue meets up with her former coach, Kumakura. On the day of the first round, Achiga is pitted against Sanomo, Urabandai and Imizusougou. After some initial difficulty, Kuro manages to show off her dora-drawing skills in her round, and Achiga soon sails to victory and advances to the second round. Later, Senriyama read up on Achiga's victory, preparing to face them in the next round, along with Koshigaya and Kentani. As Kuro enters the competition room, she encounters a waiting Toki.
| 5 | "Veteran"; Transliteration: "Kyōgō" (Japanese: 強豪) | May 7, 2012 |
As the vanguard match begins, Toki's ability to see one turn ahead puts pressure on Kuro, whose dora-style renders her defense play weak and predictable. Adding riichi with her ability, this enables Toki to dominate the match, and Kuro is left ineffective. With Kuro in tears, Yū steps into the second match motivated to get back the points Kuro lost, while Senriyama hopes to use the information they gathered on her against her.
| 6 | "Recovery"; Transliteration: "Dakkai" (Japanese: 奪回) | May 14, 2012 |
As the second match begins, Yū starts off well but soon struggles when Senriyama's Izumi Nijō figures out her play style of picking warm tiles with red characters. However, Yū makes a comeback as Izumi fails to observe that the tiles Yū draws include any which feature the color red. Then the third match is played out with Ako against Senriyama's Sera Iguchi. She manages to bring Achiga up to second place.
| 7 | "Conviction"; Transliteration: "Shinnen" (Japanese: 信念) | May 21, 2012 |
During the fourth match featuring Arata, some tough competition puts Achiga back into third place behind Kentani. As it comes down to the last hand of the final match, Shizuno faces tough odds. However, her determination to not give up gives her the opportunity to get back into second place, allowing Achiga to proceed to the semi-finals alongside Senriyama. As the girls celebrate their victory, Harue warns that in the semi-finals, they'll not only be facing Senriyama, but Shiraitodai as well. As the girls go out to eat, they spot Harue with Kumakura, who is talking with her about potentially joining the pro circuit again. As the girls start worrying that Harue may abandon them, they run into Tsuruga Academy's Momoko Touyoko and Satomi Kanbara.
| 8 | "Training"; Transliteration: "Shugyō" (Japanese: 修行) | June 4, 2012 |
Satomi brings the Achiga girls to her grandmother's house where they meet Tsuruga's Yumi Kajiki. Wanting to improve their skills and become stronger, the Achiga girls ask to train with them. Since they are not participating in the individual tournament, they are also allowed to battle against Kazekoshi Girls School's Mihoko Fukuji, and they soon come up against some national level play. The next day, the girls meet up Kei Arakawa and several other talented players to continue their training, whilst Kiyosumi play out their second round match. Later that evening, Shizuno spots Kumakura and confronts her about her discussions with Harue. To her relief, she learns that Harue turned down the offer of going pro, saying that she wants to stay with Achiga til the end. As Shizuno breaks the news to the others, they become determined to win the semifinals, where they face Shiraitodai, Senriyama and Shindouji Girls' High. The first round soon kicks off, with Kuro preparing to face off against Toki, Shindouji's Kirame Hanada and Shiraitodai's strongest player, Teru Miyanaga.
| 9 | "Best"; Transliteration: "Saikyō" (Japanese: 最強) | June 11, 2012 |
As Toki makes the first winning move, everyone starts to feel the strange power of Teru, who soon starts a winning streak that even surpasses Toki's predictions. Toki recalls the time when she was picked to be Senriyama's ace, where she revealed to Ryuuka and Sera the prediction ability she got following a collapse. Toki soon regains her confidence and helps Kirame disrupt Teru's streak. As the third South Hand begins, Teru looks set to restart her streak whilst Kuro laments that she hasn't been able to do anything.
| 10 | "Dealer's Streak"; Transliteration: "Renchan" (Japanese: 連荘) | June 18, 2012 |
Nodoka has a dream where she meets up with Shizuno and the others and ponders about its meaning. Meanwhile, the first half of the vanguard match finishes, with Teru still ahead, although the Achiga girls manage to figure something out about Teru's play style which they pass on to Kuro. Teru continues to dominate the second half, managing to get a 100,000 point lead over Senriyama, when Toki recalls when she previously attempted to look two turns ahead and ended up collapsing. Having secretly practised at home, Toki decides to put her double turn peek into practice.
| 11 | "Determination"; Transliteration: "Ketsui" (Japanese: 決意) | June 25, 2012 |
Toki uses her ability to look two turns into the future, enabling her to stop Teru's streak but leaving her extremely weak in the process. Meanwhile, Kirame recalls how her team chose her to be the sacrificial pawn owing to her purported ability to never go bust. As the game approaches its climax, Toki is left incredibly weak and is supposedly unable to use her ability. Meanwhile, as Saki, Nodoka and Yuki arrive at the arena, Saki appears to be preoccupied with something. As Toki remains under pressure as Teru decides to prolong the match, she recalls how her teammates supported her during a training camp. Determined to help her team, Toki decides to take a risk and attempt to look three turns into the future.
| 12 | "Promise"; Transliteration: "Yakusoku" (Japanese: 約束) | July 2, 2012 |
As Toki pushes her body to the limit to look three turns into the future, she predicts Kuro is finally about to make her move. As Kuro is pressured into potentially discarding a dora, she recalls her friends and her late mother and decides to discard a dora, throwing off Teru's calculations and enabling her to earn some points off Teru, bringing the first match to an end. Just then, Toki collapses from her fatigue and has to be rushed to hospital. As Achiga prepares to move on to the next match, they finally run into Nodoka, both promising to do their best to reach the finals. With their resolve in place, Yū enters the fray for the second match against Shiraitodai's Sumire Hirose, Senriyama's Izumi Nijō and Shindouji's Yoshiko Yasakouchi.
| 13 | "Free-for-all"; Transliteration: "Konsen" (Japanese: 混戦) | December 24, 2012 |
As the second match gets underway, Harue starts having practise matches with Kuro in order to revive her dora drawing ability, where Kuro learns of how Toki and Kirame helped her play against Teru. Izumi is put under pressure both by Yoshiko's cheap hands and Sumire's 'sharpshooter' style of play. Yū, on the other hand, had been taught by Harue about an unconscious tell of Sumire's which gives away who she is targeting, giving her the opportunity to strike back at her. After the second round ends and the third round begins, with Sera making some large plays, Izumi from Hiroko Funakubo hears about some of the powerful first year students in the competition before heading to the hospital to fetch Ryuuka. The match soon turns into a heated battle between Ako, Sera and Shiraitodai's Takami Shibuya, who prepares to use her 'Harvest Time' ability.
| 14 | "Aspiration"; Transliteration: "Dōkei" (Japanese: 憧憬) | January 29, 2013 |
As the third match ends with a play from Takami, Sera mentions to Ako how things may have been worse if Takami was the last dealer. The fourth match soon begins with Arata and Hiroko up against Shiraitodai's Seiko Matano and Shindouji's Mairu Shirouzu. During the match, Mairu puts limitations on her hands so that they'll be worth double when her partner, Himeko Tsuruta, plays in the following match. Meanwhile, Koromo and Hajime visit Saki, where they talk about the time they played with Achiga. Mairu wins the majority of hands, whilst Hiroko manages to use Seiko's weaknesses against her. As Arata also manages to make some wins, she recalls how Harue decided to appoint her club president, thinking of the feelings she is carrying to try and clear the semi-finals that Harue could not. As the match comes to its climax with Mairu scoring a powerful hand, Toki wakes up in hospital.
| 15 | "Intensify"; Transliteration: "Gekika" (Japanese: 激化) | April 2, 2013 |
As the fourth round comes to an end, Ako gives Shizuno her school uniform to wear as she heads to the final round between her, Awai, Ryuuka and Himeko. Himeko starts making strides using the 'keys' Mairu obtained during her respective hands in her round, moving Shindouji to second place. Meanwhile, Ryuuka discovers she is able to use some of Toki's ability to look a turn ahead to a certain extent as a result of Toki constantly resting on her lap. With both Himeko and Ryuuka winning hands, Awai decides to get serious and declares a double riichi. Thanks to Harue's advice, Shizuno manages to avoid falling into her hand and Himeko gets hit instead. When Awai attempts another double riichi however, Shizuno manages to win the hand, bringing the first half of the round to a close. Meanwhile, Koromo explains to Saki that when she played against Shizuno, she found herself being able to perform her signature hand fewer times than she had hoped. After Shizuno receives some encouragement from Ako, the match resumes.
| 16 | "Traces"; Transliteration: "Kiseki" (Japanese: 軌跡) | May 25, 2013 |
Awai resumes her double riichi play whilst Hiroko deduces that Awai's play style stems from the corners of the 'wall' that the tiles form, though cannot determine how Shizuno overcame it. After Ryuuka once again uses Toki's power to put a stop to Awai's dealership, Shizuno soon starts winning hands against Awai as, having trained in the mountains like it was her backyard, she has strengths pertaining to the 'mountain' that the walls go deep into, affecting Awai's play style and moving Achiga into first place. As Awai finds herself unable to perform double riichis again, Shizuno's power also affects Himeko's combo, delaying her win on her hand. With the last hand, Awai becomes determined to at least knock Shizuno off the top position. However, her final hand doesn't score as much as she had hoped for due to Shizuno's ability, and the match ends with Achiga in first place and Shiraitodai in second. After celebrating their victory, Achiga go to visit the new stage being built for the finals, where Harue encounters the announcer who defeated her many years ago, Sukoya Kokaji. Feeling confidence from her team, Harue pledges that she'll become a pro player once she has seen Achiga to victory in the finals. As Achiga get pumped up for the finals, Nodoka and the Kiyosumi team head off to their semi-final match.
| OVA | "Kuro's Birthday"; Transliteration: "Kuro no Tanjōbi" (Japanese: 玄の誕生日) | March 18, 2015 |
Shizuno and the others go shopping in Osaka for a present for Kuro's birthday. As the girls decide to get Kuro a digital camera, Yū ends up leaving her mittens on a branch, which Ryuuka, Toki, and Sera keep from blowing away in the wind before she returns to collect them.

== Saki: The Nationals (2014) ==
A third series shows the Kiyosumi team at the National tournament, during their quarterfinal matches with a short lead up to this point. The other teams facing Kiyosumi are also featured.

| No. | Title | Original release date |
|---|---|---|
| 1 | "To Tokyo"; Transliteration: "Jōkyō" (Japanese: 上京) | January 5, 2014 |
The other schools who will compete with Kiyosumi in the nationals are selected. Among them are Miyamori, Eisui All-Girls, Himematsu, and Rinkai All-Girls, along Shiraitodai and Achiga. As all the representatives arrive for the National tournament, the first day is dedicated for all the teams to settle themselves at Tokyo, as Saki and her friends spend some downtime with members of both Kazekoshi and Ryuumonbuchi. Despite not taking part in the tournament, the girls from Tsuruga also arrive to watch it as well. At the tournament lottery draw, a lost Saki has a short encounter with the Achiga girls before reuniting with her team mates. Kiyosumi draws a bracket in line with both Himematsu and Eisui. Per the schedule, Kiyosumi does not play until day 3 and Hisa declares that they will spend the second day leisurely in preparation for their first match.
| 2 | "Support"; Transliteration: "Ōen" (Japanese: 応援) | January 12, 2014 |
As the day of Kiyosumi's first round arrives, Saki states her determination to reach the finals before she can talk to Teru. After receiving some encouragement from Ryuumonbuchi and Tsuruga, Hisa receives a video from her school showing the support of all their friends and classmates. Moved by how many people have surrounded her in the past two years, Hisa thinks back to the training camp she held with Ryuumonbuchi, Kazekoshi, and Tsuruga. During the camp, Touka unconsciously enters a 'cold state' where she manages to beat Saki, Koromo, and Fujita. Later, Hisa invites Nodoka and Yuuki's friends from middle school, Maho Yumeno and Hiroko Muruhashi, to play with Saki and Nodoka, where Maho shows a fearsome ability.
| 3 | "Start"; Transliteration: "Shidō" (Japanese: 始動) | January 19, 2014 |
Nodoka recalls how she met Yuuki in Takatoobara Middle School and joined its mahjong club, where she also met Maho. Back at the training camp, Maho uses her ability to mimic other people's play styles, and shocks Saki when she copies her rinshan kaihou. Maho ultimately loses the rest of her hands though, as she can only mimic a certain ability once per match and her base skills are poor. It is shown that Hisa had invited Maho to the camp to both improve Mako's repertoire and give Saki a much needed sense of fear, whilst she herself trains with Koromo, Yumi, and Mihoko. Returning to the present, Kiyosumi makes it through the first round after Hisa's victory, along with Himematsu. A few days later, Kiyosumi faces their second round match with Yuuki going up against Eisui's Komaki Jindai, Miyamori's Shiromi Hosegawa, and Himematsu's Suzu Ueshige.
| 4 | "East Wind"; Transliteration: "Kochi" (Japanese: 東風) | January 26, 2014 |
Yuki makes a strong play during the game's east round, particularly against Suzu. In the second hand however, Shiromi makes a strong play whilst the 'awakened' Komaki prepares to make her move.
| 5 | "Gods and Demons"; Transliteration: "Kami Oni" (Japanese: 神鬼) | February 2, 2014 |
Just as the first player's match is about to end, Komaki makes a strong play against Yuki, knocking Kiyosumi out of the lead. The second match soon begins with Mako up against Miyamori's Aislinn Wishart, Eisui's Tomoe Karijuku, and Himematsu's Yuuko Mase. Although Miyamori has high hopes for Aislinn's ability to visualize everyone's tiles, Mako manages to counter her plays with low scoring hands, completely disrupting her flow, bringing Kiyosumi back their lead.
| 6 | "Withering"; Transliteration: "Ishuku" (Japanese: 萎縮) | February 9, 2014 |
During the lunch break, as teammates, commentators, and spectators have lunch with their respective groups, Hisa heads to the game room ahead of time, where she feels a chilling aura coming from the other players; Eisui's Haru Takimi, Miyamori's Kurumi Kakura, and Himematsu's Hiroe Atago. As the round goes on, Hisa struggles to concentrate, falling into Hiroe's plays several times and losing a lot of points. She soon remembers the most important thing about mahjong is to have fun, and she manages to regain some points with her signature bad wait. Despite falling to last place at the end of the first half, Hisa feels freed from her nervousness and is prepared to give the second half her all.
| 7 | "Attention"; Transliteration: "Chūmoku" (Japanese: 注目) | February 23, 2014 |
Despite plays by both Hiroe and Kurumi, Hisa keeps the spirit of fun in her heart and get her own play at the end, ending the round with Kiyosumi in second place. Nodoka soon hears into the vice-captain's match against Himematsu's Kinue Atago, Miyamori's Sae Usuzawa, and Eisui's Hatsumi Usuzumi. As the match begins, Nodoka immediately brings out her 'Nodocchi' play style whilst Hatsumi brings out her "Gates of Evil".
| 8 | "Fortress"; Transliteration: "Bōsai" (Japanese: 防塞) | March 2, 2014 |
Aware of Hatsumi's playstyle, Sae uses her ability to seal off her hands, though they are both surprised by Kinue's play. The rest of the half sees the three battling it out, with Nodoka seemingly oblivious to everything. After the first half, Sae, who is under stress from her power, recalls when Toshi became Himematsu's teacher and advisor. As the second half gets underway, Nodoka starts making her comeback.
| 9 | "Sortie"; Transliteration: "Shutsugeki" (Japanese: 出撃) | March 9, 2014 |
Hatsumi continues to lose points whilst Kinue helps put Himematsu into the lead, though Hatsumi manages to make a huge play before the match's end. It is soon time for the captain's match between Saki, Eisui's Kasumi Iwato, Himematsu's Kyouko Suehara, and Miyamori's Toyone Anetai. The round starts off with Kyouko scoring several consecutive wins, but Saki soon fights back with her rinshan kaihou, before Toyone starts making consecutive 'chasing riichi' plays against Kyouko.
| 10 | "Friends"; Transliteration: "Nakama" (Japanese: 仲間) | March 16, 2014 |
As the second half begins, Toyone brings out another one of her plays, the naked wait, and moves into second place. Toyone recalls her first game with the other Miyamori players, who welcomed her in with open arms. Toyone soon performs another naked wait and moves into first place, pushing Kiyosumi into third.
| 11 | "Threat"; Transliteration: "Kyōi" (Japanese: 脅威) | March 23, 2014 |
Kasumi brings out her dormant ability to draw a specific type of tiles to move into the lead, whilst Kyouko starts fighting back by drawing on her experience in three-player mahjong. Saki manages to score another rinshan kaihou and soon moves into the lead again with consecutive wins, displaying tactics which strike fear into the other players.
| 12 | "Truth"; Transliteration: "Shinjitsu" (Japanese: 真実) | March 30, 2014 |
Whilst pondering Saki's actions, Kyouko manages to move into second place, slightly ahead of Eisui. As everyone is put under pressure to win the final hand, it is Saki who ends the match with a cheap hand, bringing Kiyosumi and Himematsu into the semi-finals. Looking over Saki's records, Kyouko comes to understand that, if they were playing regular matches, Saki would have had a +-0 score. Whilst Himematsu enlist of the help of pro Yoshiko Kainou to help with a training camp for the semi-finals, Eisui invite Miyamori to join them on a trip to the beach. Meanwhile, Saki laments not being able to break out of her old playing style, worrying she may not be able to win against Kyouko a second time. Elsewhere, Nodoka has a dream about her old friend.
| 13 | "Old Friends"; Transliteration: "Kyūyū" (Japanese: 旧友) | April 6, 2014 |
As everyone besides Saki get together to watch the Side A semi-finals match, in which her old upperclassman from middle school is participating, Nodoka is surprised to find Achiga, whose mahjong club she used to be a part of, is participating in the match as well. She and Yuki head to the auditorium to watch their match, but Saki finds herself unable to join them, as knowing her sister is there triggers some traumatic flashbacks for her. Unable to get into the main hall, Nodoka and Yuki are given the opportunity to watch the match in the press room. She soon comes across Achiga's team, with Nodoka and her old friend Shizuno stating their determination to meet each other in the finals. As Saki returns to her inn, where she is visited by Koromo and Hajime, Nodoka is interviewed by the press about how she came to know the Achiga girls. Afterwards, Nodoka and Yuki deliver some tacos to Kirame, who uses them to comfort the other Shindouji players following their loss in the semi-finals. The day of the Side B semi-finals soon arrives, in which Kiyosumi and Himematsu must also compete against Rinkai Girls' School and Usuzan High School.

== Saki Biyori (2015 OVA) ==
Based on the manga spin-off by Saya Kiyoshi, Saki Biyori is a gag series following the everyday lives of the series' characters.

| No. | Title | Original release date |
|---|---|---|
| 1 | "Anime's Turn 1"; Transliteration: "Anime no Maki 1" (Japanese: アニメの巻①) | July 25, 2015 |
Kouko brings a video camera to a date with Sukoya. Meanwhile, Hisa invites the other captains over to discuss an upcoming training camp while Kana takes care of her little sisters as they play with an inflatable pool. Later, Satomi takes the Tsuruga girls on an impulsive camping trip while the Ryuumonbuchi girls celebrate Koromo's birthday.
