= List of Saki characters =

The following is a list of characters that appear Ritz Kobayashi's manga and anime series, Saki, which revolves around a girl named Saki Miyanaga who joins a mahjong club, as well as its spin-off manga and anime series, Saki: Achiga-hen - Episode of Side A.

== Main characters ==
=== Kiyosumi High School ===
The main characters start out as students at Kiyosumi High School.

Saki Miyanaga (宮永 咲, Miyanaga Saki)
Voiced by: Kana Ueda
Portrayed by: Minami Hamabe
Saki Miyanaga is a first-year student and is the titular character of the story. When originally discovered by Kiyosumi's club, she was notorious for her ability to finish plus/minus 0, essentially finishing with the same score she started with (+/- 400 points). This came out of playing with her family when she was younger, "I would not get any candy if I lose, but they will get angry if I win too many." as stated by Saki. Eventually, she joins the club so that she can reach the Inter-highs and see her sister, Teru Miyanaga, who by this time has become a top-ranked professional mahjong player.
Saki's ability once she goes for the Inter-Highs is rinshan kaihō, or winning off of a tile taken from the dead wall after calling kan. It can even go to the extent that she can call multiple kans off of the dead well en route to the win. It is because of this ability that Hisa places Saki into the captaincy position (fifth player). Moreover, because of her performance in the Nagano prefectural round and the eventual defeat of Amae Koromo, people begin considering her as one of the feared national-class monsters. Her presence when performing her ability can either take the form of white provincial flowers appearing behind her in the background with several petals swirling around (this is in reference to her name which literally translated means "a flower blooms on a ridge"), or her left eye flashing with yellow or red light in a lightning formation or forming flame-like arrays and her playing hand engulfed in yellow flames or static.
It has been noted though after the quarterfinals where Kiyosumi and Himematsu advance, that not only has Saki been using her rinshan kaiho ability, but that in fact she has continued to use her plus/minus zero ability even in tournament play. The difference in the quarterfinals is that instead of insuring that she just finishes plus/minus zero, she manipulates everyone else's score such that she winds up being the winner.
Outside of using her abilities, her gameplay tends to be rather quiet. However, she appears to get a handle on the flow of any particular game, thus allowing her to make use of her ability. She placed third in the Nagano Prefectural Individual Tournament.
Saki and Nodoka's relationship initially gets off to a shaky footing; however, eventually they become very close to the point where they frequently hold hands to draw strength from each other. In general, she is very shy, an avid bookworm, and has a terrible sense of direction (leading her to get lost easily, particularly in tournaments). Her goal is to reach the national tournament and face her sister in a mahjong match, in the hopes that even though her sister has stopped talking to her, she can communicate to her through mahjong, and they can reconcile.
In the Nationals, she is hailed as one of the first year monsters alongside Awai.
Nodoka Haramura (原村 和, Haramura Nodoka)
Voiced by: Ami Koshimizu
Portrayed by: Nana Asakawa
Nodoka Haramura is a first-year, who was the previous year's National Middle School Individual Champion and plays the vice-captain position (fourth) on the team. She first learned how to play mahjong during 4th grade while staying in a hospital. Unlike many of the national-class monsters, Nodoka does not have an innate ability that is hand related (such as Saki's rinshan, or Amae's haitei). Instead, she draws upon her online mahjong abilities in her gameplay.
Due to having so few people to play with, Nodoka turned to online mahjong. Known as "Nodocchi" (のどっち), she developed into one of the better online players (much to Touka's chagrin). She transfers her online abilities to live play as seen from her quick draws and discards. In addition, due to Hisa's recommendation she carries her stuffed penguin Etopen to help settle her down while playing in tournaments helping her reach her heightened state. That state, known as "Nodocchi mode", manifests itself as her online avatar dressed in white with a halo and white wings. In this state, she can view the board on a digital level thus negating abilities like Momoko's stealth mode. In addition, her hands come together much faster making it hard for her opponents to build their own hands as well as sense Nodoka's hands. She was the runner up of the Nagano Prefectural Individual Tournament.
Outside of gameplay, Nodoka's personality is that of a "proper lady" as noted by Mako Someya though she still carries Etopen around and sleeps with it. She considers herself very rational, to the point where she still considers Saki's rinshan ability, and earlier Kuro's dora ability to be mere coincidence. A continual running gag is that she is very self-conscious about her breasts, especially around Saki and Yuuki.
Nodoka hopes to win the tournament, so that her father, who dislikes her playing mahjong, will allow her to stay at her current school.
Yuuki Kataoka (片岡 優希, Kataoka Yūki)
Voiced by: Rie Kugimiya
Portrayed by: Aika Hirota
Yuuki Kataoka is a first year student at Kiyosumi High School and plays the vanguard (1st) position. Her main ability is to be very strong in the East wind of every game, often jumping out to huge leads against her opponents. She can supplement this with what she refers to as "taco power" by eating her favorite food, tacos - or in a pinch eating something with taco in the word such as takoyaki (たこやき) which can partially increase her ability. However, since competition games are hanchans (East and South winds), she often struggles in the south wind usually giving back most if not all of her gains.
Her mannerism at the table tends to match her childish personality, such as wearing a cape to the table during the Inter-highs and declaring she'd end the game in the first round. It can also lead her to be rather slow at realizing things, such as when Mihoko was leading her on during the prefectural final. She placed 14th in the final Nagano Prefectural Individual Tournament.
Yuuki and Nodoka first met back in Takatoobara Middle, eventually choosing to go to Kiyosumi simply because the cafeteria sells tacos. She tends to treat Kyoutarou as an errand boy, getting tacos for her or having him carry the luggage amongst other things. Despite this, she does get jealous when he looks at Nodoka or Mihoko and becomes even more self-conscious about her flat chest in comparison.
Even though she is childish in nature, she is very protective of her friends as shown when she vows to win the Inter-highs after the media states that Kiyosumi is from a weak prefecture.
On the semi-finals match against Himematsu, Rinkai and Usuzan, Yuuki changed her playstyle from high-scoring hands into cheap quick-winning hands with the intention of getting a parenchan. Her changed playstyle led to the despair of Suzu and also led Satoha to determine to utterly crush her.
Her switch of playing style was ordered by Hisa to prepare Yuuki from facing Teru with fast hands. Since Yuuki's style is increasing her points with dora tiles, Hisa also told her to get used to play fast hands with little to no dora tiles to prepare her from Kuro's dora-hoarding.
Hisa Takei (竹井 久, Takei Hisa)
Voiced by: Shizuka Itō
Portrayed by: Seika Furuhata
Hisa Takei is a third year student at Kiyosumi High School, and plays the lieutenant (third) position on the team. She is the president of the mahjong club, as well as the student council president. Her history is a bit shady as when she was younger, she went by the name of Hisa Ueno and during a tournament (in which she played with Mihoko), she mysteriously withdrew despite being near the top of the leaderboard.
Now in high school, she brings back the mahjong club at Kiyosumi in the hopes of participating in the Inter-highs though it would not be until her senior year that they would be able to compete as a team (she never wanted to participate in the individuals because she wanted to participate with others). She placed fourth in the Nagano Prefectural Individual Tournament
Hisa's ability is to win on what are termed "hell waits" - waits with those with just one tile to win (for instance like the 8-pin on a 7-9 inside wait), or those with just one tile left (if for instance in that same 8-pin wait 3 have already been discarded). This ability can intimidate opponents so much that she can use it to her advantage, tricking others to play into her hand, or in one case declaring an empty riichi (a ready hand with no winning tiles available as they have been called or discarded) so as to force an exhaustive draw.
Despite having an ability that would seem to suggest inefficient play, she is still very strategic in nature as shown when she went toe-to-toe with Mihoko in the prefectural individual tournament.
Outside of the table, Hisa exhibits great leadership skills over her team as well as organizing events and communicating with other schools in the prefecture. In addition, she is very caring towards not just her teammates, but for other players as well (such as Mihoko). This may lead her to make the statement that there is a meaning to each tile you grab.
Mako Someya (染谷 まこ, Someya Mako)
Voiced by: Ryoko Shiraishi
Portrayed by: Anna Yamada
Mako Someya is a second year student at Kiyosumi High School and plays the sergeant (second) position. Mako was introduced to mahjong at an early age as her grandfather owned a mahjong parlor and she regularly visited there (she now works there as a waitress). As a result of this, she picks up her peculiar speech manner and more importantly her special ability; she also received her glasses from him. Nicknamed "Spindle Territory", it allows her to memorize games she has seen or played in so as to be able to recall them in similar situations. She utilizes this when she takes her glasses off. However, this technique fails when playing against Kaori Senoo as her beginner playing style goes against all her prior experiences.
Mako winds up being the first person that Hisa recruits for the mahjong club and as such becomes someone that she can rely upon, often being the only person that she shares her concerns to (though in daily interactions, she is often snarky when having conversations with her). She placed 15th in the final Nagano Prefectural Individual Tournament. Her favorite hand is ryuuiisou.
She is very good against players who use an orthodox playing style as seen when she curbstomped Aislynn. However, Hao's playing style is very different that it is very hard for Mako to counter against Hao.
Kyoutarou Suga (須賀 京太郎, Suga Kyōtarō)
Voiced by: Jun Fukuyama
Kyoutarou Suga is a first year student at Kiyosumi High School. He was a classmate of Saki's back in middle school and is the one responsible for bringing her to the Kiyosumi mahjong club.
Despite being the only male in Kiyosumi's mahjong club, his skills are so poor that he winds up getting minimal attention most of the time and becomes the errand-boy fetching tacos for Yuuki or carrying the luggage of the team. His interest in both Nodoka and Mihoko, combined with his teasing of Yuuki often gets him into trouble - mostly with Yuuki.
Later in the series, he trains with Hagiyoshi to improve his taco making skills for Yuuki. He also is found to have a pet capybara that is featured in Yuuki's miniseries at the beginning and end of each Saki manga volume.

=== Achiga Girls Academy ===
This is the featured school in the side story, Saki Achiga-hen episode of side-A. Achiga is located in a rural part of Nara as evidenced by landmarks such as Yoshino Station in the series.

Shizuno Takakamo (高鴨 穏乃, Takakamo Shizuno)
Voiced by: Aoi Yūki
Played by: Hiyori Sakurada
Shizuno is a first year, plays the captain position, and is the main protagonist of the side-A story. Plays the Captain position. In sixth grade she befriends Nodoka Haramura and together they play in the school's mahjong club. Considered the club's third best player before Nodoka joined them, she had forgotten about mahjong until she stumbled upon Nodoka's national individual middle school victory. Because of this, she decides that she wants to go to the Inter-highs so that she can play against Nodoka once again, and thus reforms the mahjong club. Outside of the table, Shizuno is a high energy, athletic girl. She enjoys hanging out with her friends whenever possible and tries to have as much fun as she can.
While people are led to believe that Shizuno doesn't have any special ability, it is hinted in the semifinals that she indeed does have one. She supposedly used it at the end of the first hanchan to win off of (and thus stop) Shiraitodai's Oohoshi Awai during her dealership. The only clues about her ability is the depiction of her having summited a large hill, and the reference in the mid-game break with Ako to "11 more games" remaining. It is strong enough that Koromo makes a point of warning Saki of it while they watch the semifinal match.
It is finally revealed in the last chapter that Shizuno's ability is related to the mountains she played in as a child. Kuro and Ako recall her exploring the mountains and always finding her way home while Shizuno goes on to explain that in her time spent in the mountains, her consciousness would become one with them. In the same sense that the walls in mahjong are also referred to as mountains (山), Shizuno is able to explore the mahjong "mountains" to a deeper extent than her opponents. This doesn't necessarily result in a nullification of other player's abilities, but it can slow them down.
As shown in the second half of the semifinal Shizuno affects her opponents as follows. Against Senriyama's Ryuuka, when she uses her final ability of Toki's lap power it is probable that Shizuno prevents Toki from seeing a path to a winning hand. Versus Shindouju's Himeko and her linked power with Mairu, while Himeko still achieved her counted yakuman she noticed that her hand was slower to come together and that her link with Mairu was almost lost. And most decisively, against Shiraitodai's Awai she completely shuts out her double-riichi ability by creating rolls that make a final wall so deep she in effect "gets lost". And in the final hand (again where the final wall is very deep), Shizuno shocks Awai by taking away her kan ura-dora stating that the dead wall "is no longer her territory".
Ako Atarashi (新子 憧, Atarashi Ako)
Voiced by: Nao Tōyama
Played by: Momoka Ito
Ako is a first year and the younger sister of Nozomi Atarashi who played alongside Harue 10 years ago. Plays the Lieutenant position. She is an elementary-school friend of Shizuno Takakamo and Nodoka Haramura and was considered the second best player in the club. However, when the club was to be disbanded she decided to head off to Adamine Middle so she could continue playing mahjong (eventually for prefectural powerhouse Bansei). At Adamine, Ako was very successful as she managed to finish in the top 16 in the individual prefectural tournament. But when it came time to choose a high school, Shizuno's desire to reform the Achiga team compelled her to leave her teammates at Adamine and returns to Achiga. Like Shizuno, Ako has no special abilities, but according to nationals announcer Uta Mihirogi, she is Achiga's most skilled players but is overlooked because of the upperclassmen's special abilities.
Ako is much like Shizuno in that she wants to be with her friends as much as possible, but unlike Shizuno tends to be more rational and logical than her.
Kuro Matsumi (松実 玄, Matsumi Kuro)
Voiced by: Kana Hanazawa
Played by: Yuri Tsunematsu
Kuro is a second year and Yuu's younger sister. Plays the Vanguard position. Kuro was considered Achiga's number one player before it was disbanded. During the time the club was disbanded, she faithfully cleaned up the room in the hopes that the club would once again be revived.
Kuro's ability is to attract dora tiles during the game. This comes from the fact that her mother told her to cherish her dora, which led to her keeping them in her hand, and subsequently began collecting them more frequently. This eventually leads to her being nicknamed "The Dragon Lord". The problem with this ability is that should she ever discard a dora, she will be unable to draw one for several games thereafter. In addition, her ability is easy to identify and therefore becomes easier to play against and turn against her.
However in the national semifinals, in the final hand of her vanguard match, Kuro experiences a transformation. Recalling her memories of her sister and mom and how her friends left and returned, she realizes that people will leave her but that she will be willing to wait for them no matter what. With that realization, she becomes willing to discard a dora knowing that even if it doesn't come back she will still be waiting. Whether this transformation changes the timeframe of Kuro's dora "drought" when she discards one, or affects her abilities in general is as of now unknown. However, Kuro's willingness to discard a dora makes her play less predictable.
Yū Matsumi (松実 宥, Matsumi Yū)
Voiced by: Mako
Played by: Kome Watanabe
Yuu is a third year and the older sister of Kuro and becomes the fourth member to join Achiga's mahjong club at Kuro's request. Plays the Sergeant position. She had wanted to play with the others in the mahjong club before it was disbanded, but felt it was awkward because she was older.
Yuu is very sensitive to the cold, seen wearing coats, mufflers, gloves outside, while resorting to using kotatsus inside even on summer. This leads to her special ability which is to draw chun and manzu tiles as they represent warmth to her, due to their predominantly red color. Should that fail in a match, she draws any tile with red on it and becomes much harder to defend against. Incidentally, Toki considers her playing style similar to hers, despite their abilities being much different.
Arata Sagimori (鷺森 灼, Sagimori Arata)
Voiced by: Yumi Uchiyama
Played by: Riko Nakayama
Arata is a second year and the final member recruited for the team. Plays the Vice-Captain position. She was a huge admirer of Harue when Harue was playing for Achiga, but resented her and stopped playing when Harue decided to teach mahjong at Achiga instead of playing professionally. However, her view changes when Harue returns from her corporate team and wants to help the team reach the Inter-High again. When playing she wears a tie that was given to her by Harue, and since her family runs a bowling alley she also wears a bowler's glove. Her main play style is very much influenced by bowling, especially with how she prefers waits using "pins" tiles. As Hiroko notes, the tiles she ends up waiting for look like well-known bowling splits/washouts one gets after the first roll in bowling - the two mentioned explicitly were the Greek Church (4-6-7-9-10) and the Cincinnati (7-9). However, this is not her only way of playing as Hiroko notes that she has another "outdated" style. She later realizes that her other style is inspired by how Harue played ten years prior. In addition, Arata plays with extra determination in the semifinals, as she plays in the same position as Harue who had lost 10 years prior.
Harue Akado (赤土 晴絵, Akado Harue)
Voiced by: Naomi Shindō
Played by: Nao Minamisawa
The coach of the Achiga team, Harue was part of Achiga's first appearance in the nationals before being defeated in the semi-finals by a team which consisted of current announcer Sukoya Kojaki. The loss was so devastating that she decided to head the mahjong club at Achiga for the elementary section of the school. Eventually with the help of Kumakura (who is now the coach at Miyamori Girls'), she lands a position playing for the Hakata Evergreens corporate team. But when the team is disbanded, Harue found herself drawn back to Achiga and upon discovering that the mahjong club was being started up again decided to become its coach.

== Nagano Prefectural Tournament ==
=== Ryūmonbuchi High School ===
Koromo Amae (天江 衣, Amae Koromo)
Voiced by: Kaori Fukuhara
Portrayed by: Mai Kikuchi
Koromo is a second year student and plays captain for Ryūmonbuchi. Despite being child-like in stature, she is considered one of the national-class monsters, and brought Kazekoshi's dominance to an end last year. Her special ability can prevent opponents from tenpai, but her primary ability is to win via haitei raoyue. This ability is further enhanced the close it is to a full moon. Winning in this manner tends to invoke despair in opponents as they appear helpless to stop the eventual win at the very end.
Koromo had lost both of her parents at a younger age, and despite being brought in by Touka mainly kept to herself. Touka tried to use mahjong as a tool to help her make friends, but because of her playing style she winds up being feared by many people - including her own teammates. As a result she only sees mahjong as a mere game for her to crush her opponent until Saki is able to befriend her by teaching her the fun of playing mahjong. Her birthday is September 6.
Koromo acts like a child despite being the oldest among the members of the team. She sleeps for 12 hours a day.
Touka Ryuumonbuchi (龍門渕 透華, Ryūmonbuchi Tōka)
Voiced by: Minori Chihara
Portrayed by: Mariya Nagao
Touka is a second year student who is the president of the club and plays the vice-captain position. The daughter of the principal and grand-daughter of the founder, her family is quite rich which is reflected in her personality using formal speech as well as drinking tea like a noblewoman. Despite her attitude, she can get wrapped up in activities such as ping-pong when she defeated everyone despite stating that she viewed it as a commoner's game. She once played a RTS game for 6 days straight just to get to top 100.
As part of the noblewoman persona, she tends to try and draw attention to herself while at the same time begrudging other who seem to draw attention to themselves. This manifests itself into an obsession with Nodoka who gets all the attention at the prefectural tournament as last year's individual champion. This is further exaggerated when Touka determines that Nodoka and the online avatar Nodocchi are the same person. But in contrast to her somewhat snobby attitude, Touka does care a lot for others taking in Hajime and Koromo Amae, as well as her reasons for entering the team tournament - though if anyone ever mentions it to her, she vehemently denies it. Her birthday is September 10.
Touka's playing style is similar to Nodoka in that she plays a fair amount of online mahjong. She uses a careful approach to obtain easily winnable hands. What differs is that she uses her emotions to ride the flow of the table when going up against strong opponents. However, Touka can enter what her friends call a "cold state" where she utilizes her flow control without the hindrance of emotion. This increases her ability so much that she can easily dominate very strong opponents like Saki, Koromo and even Fujita. The problem is that in this state she loses consciousness after a few games and cannot recall anything she did while in her cold state.
Hajime Kunihiro (国広 一, Kunihiro Hajime)
Voiced by: Ai Shimizu
Portrayed by: Kyoka Shibata
Hajime is a second year student, plays the lieutenant position and is a self-proclaimed maid to Tōka. She is brought in by Touka as a second chance to play mahjong. This comes about as when she had played previously, she used her sleight-of-hand abilities to cheat during a tournament and thus had stopped playing. While Hajime took the offer, Touka chained her hands together (severely limiting her overall reach) in order to prevent her from using her sleight-of-hand. She is a maid in the Ryuumonbuchi Household.
Hajime for the most part is easy-going, though she does get a little jealous when Tōka acts friendly towards other people. From her time when she was younger, she had worn a moon tattoo on her cheek though after playing against Koromo she took it off and now wears a star instead. Since being brought in by Touka, she now consider her mahjong team as a family. Her birthday is September 21. She placed 11 in the final Nagano Prefectural Individual Tournament.
Tomoki Sawamura (沢村 智紀, Sawamura Tomoki)
Voiced by: Ayuru Ōhashi
Portrayed by: Rie Kaneko
Tomoki is a second year student and plays the sergeant position. Tomoki has a developed figure, but dresses to cover her features and is seen most of the time on her subnotebook. She was a top ranked professional player at an RTS online video game before Touka recruited her to their mahjong team. Originally from a NEET from Hokkaido, Touka admired her skills in the RTS game and decided to recruit her into the Ryuumonbuchi Mahjong Team as the fifth player. She does not have any apparent special abilities. She placed 10th in the final Nagano Prefectural Individual Tournament.
Jun Inoue (井上 純, Inoue Jun)
Voiced by: Yuko Kaida
Portrayed by: Ena Koshino
Jun is a second year student and plays vanguard position. She has a tomboyish personality which is quite popular among girls and sometimes make fun of Koromo about her childish features, while other team members reciprocate by teasing her about her male-like traits often leading her to insist that she is in fact a woman. She is one of the closer members to Koromo Amae as she is almost always seen with her, though in her spare time, she is always seen eating. Her birthday is September 14. She is also a maid in the Ryuumonbuchi Household.
Jun has a heightened sense of the flow on the board, allowing her to change things into her favor including, but not limited to disabling the tiles her opponents collect. She placed seventh in the final Nagano Prefectural Individual Tournament
Hagiyoshi (ハギヨシ, Hagiyoshi)
Voiced by: Daisuke Ono
Played by: Yuki Tamaki
Hagiyoshi is Touka Ryuumonbuchi's butler. Always calm and with a smile, he appears to be skilled at a wide variety of things such as sewing, cooking, as well as mahjong. His main trait though is to appear and disappear at the snap of Touka's fingers. In addition to his duties as a butler, he also tracks and escorts Koromo Amae when she is required for matches.
Later on it is revealed at the nationals that he and Kyoutarou met during the prefectural round while he was buying tacos. Hagiyoshi has since taught him how to make his own tacos.

=== Kazekoshi Girls School ===
A school noted to have a membership of over 80 students. The school had a strong history of winning the Nagano prefectural tournaments, until Ryuumonbuchi defeated them.

Mihoko Fukuji (福路 美穂子, Fukuji Mihoko)
Voiced by: Yui Horie
Portrayed by: Mami Kamura
Mihoko is a third year student, captain of the Kazekoshi team, and plays the vanguard position. Though always called captain by her teammates, Mihoko plays vanguard/first-up and not the captain position. She has heterochromia and has her right eye closed most of the time. Being gentle towards everyone including her mahjong opponents, she is a perfect figure in her school and takes care of the house chores in the Kazekoshi mahjong club, thinking in doing so allows other members to practice with ease, which has the reverse effect of other members worrying about her instead. She manages to remember the names of all the members in the Mahjong Club, despite having around 100 members. Her favorite saying is "Anyone who tries has a chance." Her mahjong playing ability comes when she opened her right eye, allowing her to calculate how the game progresses and predict opponent's hands with excellent accuracy, as well as a strong presence which disrupts the concentration of her opponents. Despite her abilities, she is useless with technology. The opponent that makes her most worried is Hisa Takei, the president of the Kiyosumi mahjong club. Hisa is Mihoko's old rival, back when she was known as Hisa Ueno. While Hisa had forgotten about her, they finally reminisce at the individuals tournament. Her presence manifests when she opens her right eye, triggering a blue crystal like background. While she fails to get progress to the nationals in the team tournament, she placed 1st in the Nagano Prefectural Individual Tournament, qualifying for the nationals along Saki and Nodoka.
Kana Ikeda (池田 華菜, Ikeda Kana)
Voiced by: Rika Morinaga
Portrayed by: Rena Takeda
Kana Ikeda is a second year student and plays the captain position. She has triplet sisters named Hina, Nazuna and Shirona who look exactly like her. She is very fond of her captain Mihoko. She was the only one in her year to get into Kazekoshi with a scholarship due to her achievements in middle school mahjong tournaments. Even though Kana is not the strongest player on their team, Mihoko entrusts the captain position to her so she can have another match-up against Koromo Amae and avenge their loss the previous year. Kana is very cat-like, sprouting ears and a tail at any given time, and she also purrs. Kana also appears in the Yuuki miniseries. Kana is a cheerful and has great confidence in her mahjong skill. Kana is shown to be very fond of Mihoko and loves to be petted by her. Kana has proclaimed that there is no-one who is more annoying than she is. She has also shown to be very stubborn. She placed ninth in the final Nagano Prefectural Individual Tournament.
Miharu Yoshitome (吉留 未春, Yoshitome Miharu)
Voiced by: Chiro Kanzaki
Portrayed by: Aya Yoshizaki
Miharu Yoshitome is a second year and plays the sergeant position. She is close with Kana and is given the nickname Miharun by her. She, like Yuuki tends to be sensitive about her flat-chest as evidenced when she saw Kaori entering the bath during the training camp. The incident exaggerates her implied rivalry with her which started in the prefectural tournament. She has far-sightedness and got glasses to be able to see mahjong tiles clearly. She placed 13th in the final Nagano Prefectural Individual Tournament.
Seika Bundou (文堂 星夏, Bundō Seika)
Voiced by: Ai Matayoshi
Portrayed by: Yuzu Higuchi
Seika Bundou is a first year student, and plays the lieutenant position. Previously ranked 78th in the club, she worked her way up to fifth before the tournament thus earning a spot on the team. Always seen with her eyes closed, Bundou tends to worry before and during her matches. However, after the prefectural tournament Bundou has been shown to have more confidence in herself, going so far as to say that her and Kazekoshi will be going to the nationals next year. One of her hobbies include collecting the mahjong stars series trading cards.
Sumiyo Fukabori (深堀 純代, Fukabori Sumiyo)
Voiced by: Mitsuki Saiga
Portrayed by: Mizuki Hoshina
Sumiyo Fukabori is a second year student, and plays the vice-captain position. She is a rather quiet individual and rarely talks outside of her matches. She is not shown doing much but standing in the background with her teammates. Sumiyo currently takes care of the Ikeda triplets with Seika Bundou, while their parents are at work and Kana Ikeda is away at the nationals.
Takako Kubo (久保 貴子, Kubo Takako)
Voiced by: Miho Yamada
Played by: Hinako Sano
Takako Kubo is the coach of Kazekoshi Girls School. She initially is shown to have a rather harsh personality, to the point of physically abusing her team when they do not perform to her high expectations. However she does care for them, shown when she tried to comfort Kana Ikeda after her loss in the prefectural finals. She is friends with Yasuko Fujita and together they work on a mahjong selection committee.

=== Tsuruga Academy ===
A well-funded academy, the Mahjong club mainly makes use of online mahjong as a training instrument via portable laptops.

Yumi Kajiki (加治木 ゆみ, Kajiki Yumi)
Voiced by: Yu Kobayashi
Portrayed by: Natsumi Okamoto
Yumi Kajiki is a third year and plays the captain position. Originally very weak at mahjong, she wound up buying a book after a loss to Kanbara in her first year, which allowed her to get much better. While she does not have a special ability, she is able to recognize players' abilities and try to form a defense against them as evidenced by her match in the prefectural finals.
Yumi also exhibits great leadership skills which wind up having her mistaken for the club president instead of the laid-back Kanbara. These skills allow Tsuruga to become a strong team and reach the finals for the first time in school history.
Outside of mahjong, Yumi has a particularly strong relationship with Momoko as she was the first one to show interest in her and was responsible for bringing her into the club; it is implied that she chose to come to the training camp in large part to spend time with Momo. And when Kanbara first met Yumi she thought she was a gloomy ice queen, but changed her opinion after they became friends. Initially not able to swim, she learned how to do so under Momo's guidance. She placed sixth in the final Nagano Prefectural Individual Tournament
Momoko Touyoko (東横 桃子, Tōyoko Momoko)
Voiced by: Momoko Saito
Portrayed by: Ano
Momoko is a first year, and plays the vice-captain position. She is sought out specifically by Yumi after a match through LAN mahjong, and "appears" when Yumi calls her out during a class break to acknowledge her skills. The two wind up becoming very close friends, so much so that she gets jealous of others Yumi shows interest in as well as becoming very anxious of what will happen after Yumi graduates. Her speech includes an accent which often adds the ending "su" and "s" any to her sentences.
Momo eventually becomes known as "Stealth Momo", as she uses her negative presence to essentially become invisible at the table. This comes about because she is often ignored by her friends despite her efforts to gain attention. Eventually she gave up on building relationships with other people and thus carried a lacking presence (normally depicted as either completely invisible, fading away from plain sight, or parts of herself slightly dissipating into a steam-like formation). However, this ability can be negated by players who ignore presence such as Nodoka (and later on by Saki, using the same principle that Nodoka subconsciously employed). She placed 12th in the final Nagano Prefectural Individual Tournament.
Satomi Kanbara (蒲原 智美, Kanbara Satomi)
Voiced by: Natsuko Kuwatani
Portrayed by: Aguri Ōnishi
Satomi Kanbara is a third year, plays the lieutenant position and is the president of the schools mahjong club. Laid-back in nature, she is always seen with a wide smile and her distinguished laugh. This can tend to lead to incorrect assumptions as Yumi initially thought she was an idiot with an empty-headed grin - but she changed her opinion after they became friends. In reality, she doesn't let anything get to her and has a lot of trust in her team members. She is one of the few who can detect Momo, though only when she is upwind of her.
As she is 18, she has a driver's license and drives a Volkswagen Type 2 Van. Her personality is also reflected in her driving style, which is a bit on the reckless side. Her first time driving was to the beach with her fellow mahjong club members, and this made the rest of the members afraid of her driving.
In Achiga Hen ~ Side A, Satomi appears after they run into the Achiga team who were spying on Harue after reaching the semifinals. After hearing Achiga request to become stronger, she takes them back to her grandmothers place where they ask Yumi for help. When Yumi agrees, Kanbara gets Mihoko to help Achiga as well. She placed 19th in the final Nagano Prefectural Individual Tournament
Kaori Senoo (妹尾 佳織, Senoo Kaori)
Voiced by: Ryoko Shintani
Portrayed by: Marina Nagasawa
Kaori is a second year and plays the sergeant position. She is recruited by childhood friend Kanbara to complete the team of 5 despite being a beginner. Amazingly, it is shown that she appears to have an enhanced form of beginners luck, allowing her to get big hands against strong opponents. Because of this, she is forbidden from practicing or studying before the individuals, under the belief that she would lose her luck, but not improve enough in that time to compensate for it.
Kaori is a very shy and ditsy girl who gets nervous easily, yet does appear to have a perceptive side having noticed that Saki Miyanaga was not the least bit deterred during her match against Kazue Nanpo.
Mutsuki Tsuyama (津山 睦月, Tsuyama Mutsuki)
Voiced by: Shin Nanasawa
Portrayed by: Mari Yamachi
Mutsuki Tsuyama is a second year, and plays the vanguard position. Nicknamed Mukki by Kanbara, she collects the mahjong star trading card series to which she gives Seika Bundou the collectors card she wanted as a gift. She gets motion sickness from Kanbara's driving. Mutsuki appears to be a very reliable girl and is named the next president of the mahjong club once their tournament is over.

== National Tournament ==
=== Shiraitodai High School ===
West Tokyo Prefecture. The first seeded school. This school is the top ranked team in the tournament and has won the last two national titles. Before Miyanaga Teru played for Shiraitodai, Shiraitodai and the West prefecture was infamously known as giving second-rated players.

Teru Miyanaga (宮永 照, Miyanaga Teru)
Voiced by: Mai Nakahara
Played by: Minami Hamabe
Saki's older sister, who is a third year and plays Vanguard position. Head of the Shiraitodai team, she is the national high school individual champion of at least the previous year and is considered to be not only the strongest player in high school, but possibly one of the strongest in the country. In addition to the individual titles, Teru has helped Shiraitodai win the past two national tournaments and is leading them for their third straight title. According to Fujita, she was one of the three monsters to show themselves in national tournaments of the past two years (Koromo and Jindai being the others). In each match, she spends the first hand analyzing her opponent's innate abilities. Afterwards, she is capable of going on long winning streaks with the value of each successful hand worth more than the previous. This manifests itself in a tornado on her right arm. She and Sumire form the ToraHime (Tiger and Princess) combination with Teru being the tiger. Due to her winning streaks, she was put on the Vanguard position instead of the Captain position to fully maximize her winning streaks, to the point of deciding some matches by herself when she plummets her opponents' points below zero.
However, her ability does lead to problems. First of all, since the values of her hands must increase with each win, she must find ways to increase the yaku of her hand, which can lead to unusual plays. Second, in analyzing her opponent's abilities she has reached the point where she assumes the players character to be static and unchanging. These issues were made evident in the national semifinals as first she was unable to increase the value of her hands thanks to Kuro's ability to collect dora and thus had to resort to even more drastic measures to achieve her goal. And in the final hand of the hanchan, Kuro changing her mindset and strategy and discarding a dora without fear resulted in Teru being unable to win and instead playing into Kuro's hand ending the hanchan.
As for Teru's personal life, she and her mother moved from Nagano to Tokyo as a result of a separation in the family. While they used to play mahjong when they were all together, Teru now refuses to speak with Saki and denies her younger sister's existence despite her efforts to reach the finals. It is still unknown why she ignores Saki, but according to the manga, it is implied that an accident, which might have been witnessed by Saki, involved a close acquaintance of the two sisters.
Sumire Hirose (弘世 菫, Hirose Sumire)
Voiced by: Mitsuki Saiga
Played by: Mikoto Hibi
Third year, plays Sergeant position. She makes up the Hime (princess) part of the ToraHime (Tiger and Princess) combination with Teru. She is also known as Shiraitodai's "Sharpshooter". Her main ability is the ability to target a player at the table and then proceed to win off of them by changing her hand to target them with a certain discard. If the opponent were to somehow avoid playing in, she will try change her hand and win off of them again, but this compromises her defense. This playstyle is perfect for targeting the weaker schools and busting them out. This is known as her "Piercing Arrow". However, unbenounced to her Harue has noticed a tell which involves the movement of her right hand ever so slightly before directing a gaze at the player whom she wishes to target. Matsumi Yuu took advantage of this early on in Achiga's semifinal match against Shiraitodai, dodging the first "arrow" and attacking when Sumire weakens her defense in response.
Outside of mahjong, Hirose is one of the few who are a friend of Teru's. In addition, she is the only person known to Teru who seems to have had prior knowledge of Saki's existence. She is often noted to treat Teru 'coldly' when referring to Saki.
Takami Shibuya (渋谷 尭深, Shibuya Takami)
Voiced by: Megumi Toyoguchi
Played by: RaMu
Takami is a second year who wears glasses and always carries a cup of tea. She plays the Lieutenant position. Her ability is called "Harvest Time", in which, on the All-Last round, she will have all the tiles that she first discarded in the previous rounds. The length of the round determines the strength of her ability - at best it can result in an immediate Tenhou/Chiho Yakuman and at worst it gives her only seven tiles (which, if all seven are dragons, can still result in a Daisangen yakuman). No records of her being last dealer exist; Eguchi Sera speculates that in that case she would be able to continue harvesting Yakuman hands while remaining dealer.
Seiko Matano (亦野 誠子, Matano Seiko)
Voiced by: Kaori Shimizu
Played by: Karen Iwata
Seiko is a second year who sports a tomboyish look. She plays vice-captain. She is known as The Fisherman of Shiraitodai and her ability involves her "fishing" (calling) a tile that will advance her hand in the "pond" (discard pile), and is she manages to fish three times, she is guaranteed to win in the next five turns. Her playstyle is fast and as such, her opponents need to quickly form their hands if she starts calling.
Awai Oohoshi (大星 淡, Ōhoshi Awai)
Voiced by: Chiwa Saitō
Played by: Yuumi Shida
Awai is a first year and plays the Captain position. She is a blonde-haired girl who is hailed as one of the first year monsters alongside Saki. In fact, according to Hiroko Funakubo, Awai is the nations most dangerous first years, and is considered to be the successor of Teru Miyanaga. Her special ability activates at the beginning of every hand: her hair begins to wave and a night sky appears behind her. After this the starting hand of all her opponents will usually be very poor with a low probability of completion (e.g. hands with 5-6 shanten). Afterwards, her opponents' draws are normal and they usually have to resort to declaring chis, pons or kans to advance their hands which seems to cause them to play more easily in Awai's hands.
This ability of hers is very difficult to get around and only two people have been confirmed to be able to actually beat it - her team mate Takami Shibuya with her "Harvest Time" ability during the last hand, and Awai's opponent Himeko Tsuruta who, by linking with her team-mate Mairu Shirouzu, can win during a specific round Mairu won (e.g. the East third round).
Awai has a second ability, which involves her declaring double-riichi (riichi on the first turn). Teru states that she has only used this ability publicly once before the Inter-Highs depicted in the manga. It is then explained that Awai's ability begins with declaring double-riichi, then declares kan before rounding the last corner of the wall, wins the hand after passing the last corner, and then turn her kan into uradora immediately scoring 6 han (2 for double-riichi, 4 for the uradora) for an automatic haneman.
Due to her skills and abilities, Awai is considerably confident, cocky, and arrogant, but is shown to be the most talkative and cheerful out of her Shiraitodai team-mates. She seems fairly close to Teru, and calls her by her first name without any honorifics, which is somewhat unusual outside of close friends.

=== Rinkai All-Girls School ===
East Tokyo Prefecture. The fourth seeded school. Rinkai had been well known for recruiting mahjong players from across the world to play for their school. However, a rule which had been implemented forced Rinkai to field one Japanese player for their team.

Satoha Tsujigaito (辻垣内 智葉, Tsujigaito Satoha)
Voiced by: Yoko Hikasa
Third year, plays vanguard position. As Rinkai's only Japanese mahjong player, she must play vanguard under the new rules. She was the third placer in the Individual tournament last year, right behind Miyanaga Teru and Arakawa Kei. She is determined to end Yuuki's attempt of a continuous dealership due to the fact that Yuuki reminded her of Arakawa Kei. Although she was appointed as the vanguard due to being the only Japanese player, Rinkai's coach and her teammates explicitly mentioned that she is the vanguard and the ace due to her results last year.
Hao Huiyu (郝 慧宇, Hao Hoeiyū)
First year and plays the sergeant position. Originally coming from Hong Kong, she is Inchon mahjong league's post silver medalist. She was a champion player of Hong Kong mahjong. She decided to play in the Asian Mahjong Tournament but because of difference in rules between Chinese mahjong and Riichi mahjong, she lost badly. Therefore, she decided to play in the Interhigh tournament to get exposure as the Interhigh tournament have rules that are more or less similar as the Asia tournament.
Her way of playing is using MCR mahjong mindset while still playing Riichi mahjong is a perfect counter to Mako. As she plays with the MCR mindset, she does not declare riichi. Due to her background, she does not know some of the rules in the riichi tournament, like the noten penalty. Mako considered her style closely similar to Hisa in which both of them discard tiles that would give them a higher chance of winning to win on a specific tile.
Choe Myeonghwa (雀 明華, Chē Myonfa)
Second year. She is a French-Korean and known as European mahjong league's top ranked player, referred as "Venter" or "The God of Wind".
Her family name, 雀 (the second character of the word 麻雀 "mahjong"), is likely to be a misnomer as the character 雀 reads as "jak" (작 in hangul) in Korean. It is most likely intended to be the similar 崔 ("choe", 최 in hangul), a common Korean family name which is also romanized "Choi".
Her main ability, according to Kinue Atago, is to always start off with a pung of her seat wind and as such she already has one yaku with her initial thirteen tiles. It is also implied that she has further abilities.
Her father died some time ago, and she has been raised by her mother, a professor, ever since. She hopes to become independent so that her mother will not be as burdened.
Megan Davin (メガン・ダヴァン, Megan Davan)
Voiced by: Chiaki Omigawa
Third year. From America. In the Nationals last year, she fought against Touka in the Vice-Captain battle and had awakened Cold Touka. She was so scared of Cold Touka that she ended up targeting another school, ending the game, resulting in Koromo not being able to play. She was disappointed to hear that she won't be facing Ryuumonbuuchi this year.
Her ability is to be able to tell when others are in tenpai when she herself is in a tenpai, and is able to call announce a duel. Even if she is not in riichi or in damaten, as long as she is in tenpai, she is able to see if other players are in tenpai as well, as seen with a cowboy imagery. When she declares a duel, within 3 turns, either Megan or the other player will lose. Megan would usually win. The weak point of this ability is that she has a likely chance to deal in when her duel is disrupted by having the player whom she has targeted as the player in her duel would intentionally take herself out in tenpai (either to change waits or to betaori). Another weakness is that when she announces a duel with a player, her duel is locked on to that player herself and the other players on the table can use this chance to successfully assassinate her. This weak point was used skillfully by Kinue as Megan dealt in to Kinue when Kinue changed her wait and got herself into a tenpai, distracting Megan to duel with Maya with a kokushi hand.
Nelly Virsaladze (ネリー・ヴィルサラーゼ, Nerī Virusarāze)
First year. Originally of Georgian descent. She was World Junior Champion. She occasionally alludes to having a need for money, and possibly as a result of this, is somewhat concerned with what the sponsors of Rinkai's team will think.

=== Eisui All-Girls School ===
Kagoshima Prefecture. Eisui, considered to be the strongest team from the Kyushu region. The third seeded school and its members wear miko (shrine maiden) outfits and stay in solemn rooms during competitions. For this years competition, all the branch families have come together so that Komaki Jindai doesn't have to carry the team by herself. They were responsible for dropping Himematsu into fifth place.

Komaki Jindai (神代 小蒔, Jindai Komaki)
Voiced by: Saori Hayami
Second year, plays vanguard position. Referred to as "Princess" by her teammates and she is an average player when awake, but is considered as a national-class monster when asleep. She is a vessel for seven out of the eight Goddesses and as such, one of her notable play style is attacking the weakest player on the table with the Nine Gates yakuman. She is the team's captain and the daughter of the main branch of the family. A year prior to the events of the story she had achieved fame as one of the new monsters of the nationals, but pushed herself too hard and the reason why this year's lineup for Eisui's team consists of the branch families.
Tomoe Karijuku (狩宿 巴, Karijuku Tomoe)
Voiced by: Chinatsu Akasaki
Third year, plays sergeant position. She prefers to wear her school uniform over the miko outfit, and was seen to be only wearing the miko outfit during the match.
Haru Takimi (滝見 春, Takimi Haru)
Voiced by: Kaori Mizuhashi
First year, plays lieutenant position. Wins with cheap hands if she senses her opponent's hands coming together. A stoic person who never smiles unless talking about two things-- Muscuvado chips and the demon world.
Hatsumi Usuzumi (薄墨 初美, Usuzumi Hatsumi)
Voiced by: Ayumi Tsuji
Third year, plays vice-captain position. She wears a traditional headdress that scares Nodoka during the quarterfinals. Like Kataoka and Nanpo, Hatsumi wins more often in the north position. Her ability, called the "Gates of Evil", makes it easy for her to gather north and east tiles, and to a lesser extent, south and west tiles, as a reference to misfortune hailing from the northeast. With her ability, every time she is in the north position, she has a higher chance of playing the Little four winds or the Big four winds yakuman. She is referred as Deadly Storm.
Kasumi Iwato (石戸 霞, Iwato Kasumi)
Voiced by: Sayaka Ōhara
Third year, plays the captain position. She has been known to play defensively and her records shows that she has never dealt into someone's hand and is only damaged by a tsumo. As the most closely related to Komaki, she is the vessel for the last Goddess and her ability is that she can randomly collect one suit and honor tiles for each round. As such, her hands deals with big damages and this playstyle can only be on the attack, conflicting with her usual defensive playstyle. If she uses this ability she cannot return to her regular playing style until she has been purified so she is always careful when using this ability. She is considered by Suehara as the most dangerous player in Eisui.

=== Senriyama Girl's High ===
North Osaka Prefecture. The second seeded school. Senriyama is considered the strongest school in the Kansai region and the second ranked school in the nation. Senriyama makes its 11th straight national appearance and is the fourth overall seed. Overall, it is also the school's 25th appearance in the national championships.

Toki Onjōji (園城寺 怜, Onjōji Toki)
Voiced by: Yui Ogura
Played by: Nao Sakura
Third year, plays vanguard position. She is physically weak, but has the ability to predict one turn into the future. However, if she changes her prediction she loses the ability for one go-around. She once tried to see two turns, but that put her back into the hospital. Ryuuka had her promise not to do it again, but unbeknownst to him she has been practicing and has been able to see two turns into the future though it severely drains her. In addition, should she become too fatigued she loses her abilities outright.
In the national semifinals she uses her look two ahead ability to try and stop Teru, and despite her condition pushes even further to see three turns ahead. After the match is over, she collapses due to fatigue and is rushed to the hospital by her teammates.
Izumi Nijō (二条 泉, Nijō Izumi)
Voiced by: Maho Matsunaga
Played by: Manami Arai
First year, plays sergeant position. Izumi has very stable play and protects points well. However, she is a normal person, without special abilities, and thus, was unable to defend against Hirose Sumire's piercing shots. She seems to think that she is the best first year player in the tournament. She lost to Nodoka last year during the Inter Middle Individual Championship and consider her as a rival.
Sera Eguchi (江口 セーラ, Eguchi Sēra)
Voiced by: Arisa Noto
Played by: Mizuha
Third year, plays lieutenant position. She hates wearing girl's clothes and often wears a t-shirt and shorts, only being forced to wear her uniform during matches. Her playstyle is to play with slow but very big hands, completely the opposite of Ako's playstyle. As a second year she was the teams ace player and did very well during the inter-high tournament.
Hiroko Funakubo (船久保 浩子, Funakubo Hiroko)
Voiced by: Manami, Sachika Misawa (Achiga-hen ep. 13 onwards)
Played by: Rino Shimazaki
Second year, plays vice-captain position. Analytical in nature, she is able to determine the Matsumi sisters' abilities thus allowing Senriyama to achieve an easy win in their first match against Achiga. Senriyama's coach is Atago Masae, Hiroko's aunt, and there is unfounded gossip that Hiroko only managed to go into the team due to the coach's influence, which the coach hopes will be disproved by Hiroko's performance.
Ryuuka Shimizudani (清水谷 竜華, Shimizudani Ryūka)
Voiced by: Kaori Ishihara
Played by: Yuka Ogura
Third year who plays in the captain position. She is constantly looking after Toki, and hoped Toki would get onto the main team to play alongside her. As the result of Toki resting on her lap so much, she is able to use some of her prediction ability during the semi-finals. However, unlike Toki she is only limited to seeing her own hand. In addition, her usage of the ability is perhaps dependent on the softness of her lap (i.e. how fat her thighs are). Ryuuka briefly considers getting a bit "fatter" after realizing this, but Toki immediately and vehemently objects to the idea.

=== Himematsu High ===
South Osaka Prefecture. One of the top ranking schools in the Nationals. One of the strongest school in the Kansai region along with their cross-town rival, Senriyama. They were a seeded school until the emergence of Eisui last year, knocking them off to fifth place.

Suzu Ueshige (上重 漫, Ueshige Suzu)
Voiced by: Arisa Date
Second year, plays vanguard position. Kyouko recommended her on the team because of her ability to win explosively albeit rarely. Can do well if the game is all simples. If she fails at a task given to her by Kyouko, as punishment, Kyouko will write something on her forehead. Kyouko says she usually wins explosively the stronger her opponent gets, although sometimes she misfires. At the quarterfinals, she won explosively with a baiman when Satoha switched into an offensive mode. When she is on an explosive streak, she tends to win on high 7-8-9 tiles.
Yuuko Mase (真瀬 由子, Mase Yūko)
Voiced by: Haruka Yoshimura
Third year, plays sergeant position. A careful player who is always seen to be smiling. On both the quarterfinal match and the semi-final match, she finished with a positive score. On a table against Hao, she tend to go for a quick closed hand without declaring riichi. When Mako went on to the attack, Yuuko immediately defended and discards safe tiles.
Hiroe Atago (愛宕 洋榎, Atago Hiroe)
Voiced by: Satsumi Matsuda
Third year, plays lieutenant position. Captain of the Himematsu High's mahjong team, and the older daughter of Senriyama's coach. She has amazing self confidence and the skill to back it up. She is the ace player and one of the few people that can go up against Shiratodai. Known as the "Trap Master" and uses bluff to manipulate the opponent into unwillingly playing into her big hands. She is considered one of the best players despite not having any special abilities whatsoever as she is able to consistently win with big hands and are able to counteract other strategies against her.
Kinue Atago (愛宕 絹恵, Atago Kinue)
Voiced by: Mariko Nakatsu
Second year, plays vice-captain position. Younger sister of Hiroe, she passed up a soccer scholarship to be with her sister though she shows her skills when she inadvertently kicks Etopen thinking it was something else. She seems to have a sister complex for Hiroe, as shown when, after hearing Hiroe speak highly of Kyouko, she wished Hiroe would think of her the same way.
Kyouko Suehara (末原 恭子, Suehara Kyōko)
Voiced by: Minako Kotobuki
Third year, plays captain position. She is usually the one that briefs the team about their opponents. She does not have any special powers per se, but she is quite adept at three-player mahjong. While Hiroe comes to the table with the mentality that she will win, she comes to the table with the mentality that she is going to lose. As such, she is always very careful and calculative during the match, passing up a potential win for a higher scoring hand. She took up the challenge of facing against monsters in the captain's position despite being a normal player and as such, Saki considers her as the most resilient player as Kyouko was able to turn a decent scoring hand into a high scoring hand against players with special abilities and win.
Ikuno Akasaka (赤阪 郁乃, Akasaka Ikuno)
Voiced by: Junko Noda
Himematsu current acting director. She very cheerful and her eyes are often closed.

=== Miyamori Girl's High ===
Iwate Prefecture. Originally having only three members. Miyamori is one of the few schools who proceed to the second round of the 71st Inter High, and is widely famous for knocking off the high ranking Makabi High.

Shiromi Kosegawa (小瀬川 白望, Kosegawa Shiromi)
Voiced by: Juri Nagatsuma
Third year, plays vanguard position. She is stoic, quiet, and apathetic. She is very tactical during her matches. According to her teammates, Shiromi has a unique style. When she worries about her hand, it usually means that its high scoring and normally scores her points this way. She is tactful when it comes to her opponents hands and has solid defense. She often discards what others call risky tiles, but it has not been shown to backfire on her.
Aislinn Wishart (エイスリン・ウィッシュアート, Eisurin Wisshuāto)
Voiced by: Mariko Mizuno
Third year, plays sergeant position. Originally from New Zealand, she communicates with her teammates with a white board as she does not know the language. There is nothing flashy nor anything that stands out about her game but according to Shiromi Kosegawa, Aislinn can draw her ideal table like something from a dream. Whenever she plays she always gets a winning hand and in terms of winning percentage she was first in her country. Kyouko Suehara explains that Aislinn will always get a closed hand tenpai before the 13th turn.
Kurumi Kakura (鹿倉 胡桃, Kakura Kurumi)
Voiced by: Moe Toyota
Third year, plays lieutenant position. Kurumi does not declare riichi during her matches. She does this so her opponents cannot tell if shes in tenpai or not. She does not tolerate any of Hiroe's loudmouthedness.
Sae Usuzawa (臼沢 塞, Usuzawa Sae)
Voiced by: Rina Satō
Third year, plays vice-captain position and wears a monocle. She has the ability to "mark" an opponent by keeping her gaze on them, so that they will not be able to complete a hand. This ability though is very fatiguing and can cause her to be on the verge of collapse afterwards. She was responsible for taking out Makabi High's strongest player and getting Miyamori to the nationals. She seems to look up to Coach Kumakura, even using her monocle. This monocle seems to have some sort of power to it, as the lens clouds over when someone is away to win with a big hand. It also seems to react to "monster" players as it shatters due to Saki Miyanaga's power.
Toyone Anetai (姉帯 豊音, Anetai Toyone)
Voiced by: Maaya Uchida
Third year, plays captain position. Toyone's most distinguishing characteristic is that she is very tall (taller than Jun), usually wears large brim hats, and has unique eyes. Recruited from a rural area in Iwate, she possesses the "Rokuyou" abilities. One is to declare a riichi after another player declares, winning off of the initial riichi, which is known as "Senbu". This is where she gains her nickname of Right-behind-you-Toyone. Her second ability is to win when she has one tile remaining in her hand, which is known as "Tomobiki". A third ability is called "Shakkou" and this ability allows her to call dora tiles by having the surrounding two tiles (for example, in the manga, when Toyone is told to use Shakkou, Toyone calls the four of bamboos, which is a dora tile, with the three and five of bamboos). It is unknown if Toyone has other abilities related to the other "Rokuyou".
Since she lives in the rural area of Iwate, and due to her village not having many young people, Toyone learnt how to play Mahjong by watching matches on the television and using her own mahjong set. Due to watching a lot of mahjong matches on television, she is a fan of "Mahjong idols" like Jindai and Nodoka. At the end of the captain's match, aside from asking Jindai's and Nodoka's autograph, she also asked for Saki's, Kasumi's and Kyouko's autographs.
Toshi Kumakura (熊倉 トシ, Kumakura Toshi)
Voiced by: Kaoru Morota
She is Miyamori's coach and seems to be a very adept mahjong player as when she is first introduced to the girls, they have a friendly match and she repeatedly brings them all below zero. She was responsible for recruiting Harue for the company team in Fukuoka. They meet up again at nationals where she inquires about Harue going pro once again. However, she is rebuffed by Harue as she states that she wants to see her team through first before thinking about herself. During the matches, she gives her monocle to Sae. She also seems to know a lot about the competition as she frequently provides commentary on the matches to the Miyamori students and offers them advice.

=== Shindouji Girl's High ===
Fukuoka Prefecture. This team has a history of reaching the national tournament, however with bad results.

Kirame Hanada (花田 煌, Hanada Kirame)
Voiced by: Satomi Arai
Played by: Yuuka Yano
Second year, plays vanguard position. Attended the same Takatoobara Middle School that Nodoka and Yuki attended. Was chosen over their fifth best player, Tomokiyo, to be a sacrificial lamb. The team has been re-structured from weakest to strongest this year to try and counteract other teams' strategies, and as such her ability to not lose all her points means the team at least survives for one round. Although Himeko feared she would be upset by knowing that she was not chosen for her skill, she is glad to be of some use to them. She constantly likes to say "Marvelous!" (すばらっ!, Subara!), even when the situation is bad.
Yoshiko Yasakouchi (安河内 美子, Yasakouchi Yoshiko)
Voiced by: Megumi Takamoto
Played by: Rio Kotomi
Third year, plays sergeant position. She is Shindouji's fourth best player. Her ability is not described at this point, but Sumire and Izumi both notice that her playing style in the semifinals differs from her records or prior games. Sumire goes further to state that it is as if she is going for big hands but winds up settling for something cheaper. The reason for this was because it was to counteract Sumire from using her "Piercing Arrow" playstyle. She was shown to be relieved when Sumire went to target other schools instead.
Hitomi Ezaki (江崎 仁美, Ezaki Hitomi)
Voiced by: Yuiko Tatsumi
Played by: Haruka Iwasaki
Third year, plays the lieutenant position. She is Shindouji's third best player. She seems to think that the reason Shindouji went back from third to fourth place was because of the government's doing.
Mairu Shirouzu (白水 哩, Shirouzu Mairu)
Voiced by: Yui Kano
Played by: Riho Takada
Third year, plays vice-captain position. She is Shindouji's second best player and the captain of the Shindouji's Mahjong club. She was the ace of Shindouji last year and the reason why Shindouji did very badly last year was because of her as she was not able to match up to other school's aces. She was the one who suggested to use Kirame as a sacrificial pawn. Her and Himeko's ability is called the "Tsuru no Ongaeshi" or "The Return Of Gratitude of The White Crane". That means that if Mairu binds herself and win a han, on the next match, Himeko is guaranteed to win it with double the han. (If Mairu wins with two han, Himeko would win it with four han, three han to six han, and so forth).
The downside is that if Mairu does not win, it will be difficult for Himeko to win that round, and only at one han at best. Also, for example, if Mairu binds herself with three han but she managed to chance an uradora that increased her han, the additional han will not pass over to Himeko, so Mairu is careful at binding the hans she could accomplish.
Her and Himeko's ability are the reason for Shindouji's lineup. Three years prior, both of them were a terror in the Inter Middle. Mairu faced of Teru in a match in a previous year and that is the reason why Shiraitodai knows of their ability which is nigh impossible to detect.
Himeko Tsuruta (鶴田 姫子, Tsuruta Himeko)
Voiced by: Asuka Ōgame
Played by: Sae Okazaki
Second year, plays captain position. She is currently Shindouji's best mahjong player. Her and Mairu's ability is called the "Tsuru no Ongaeshi" or "The Return Of Gratitude of The White Crane". A third player for Shindouji. She wears a uniform that has a sleeve too long for her and has been with Mairu ever since middle school. She and Mairu are considered as Shindouji's double aces. When Mairu successfully binds a han, a key appears before her. The key appears during the round in her turn and if she uses it, she will be able to win it double the han. Hers and Mairu's linked ability is so powerful that it was able to override Awai's 5-6 isshanten ability. Her key is so strong that it even negates Ryuuka's predictions.

=== Usuzan High School ===
From South Hokkaido. Like Kiyosumi, this is Usuzan's first time appearing at the Nationals. Mizuhara-pro had stated that Usuzan is one of the scarier schools to face. They did not catch up to Rinkai in the Quarterfinal match until the vice-captain match. They use the same tactic as Shindouji and Makabi with their line-up being weakest to strongest. However, unlike Shindouji, only their vice-captain and captain are National-class players. The captain is however, in a higher league from their already strong vice-captain.

Naruka Motouchi (本内 成香, Motouchi Naruka)
Voiced by: Kanae Itō
A second year student who plays the Vanguard position. She has light purple hair with her bangs covering half of her face, and her hair tied into two twintails at the back of her head. She was mostly tenpai in the vanguard match but hardly wins any hand and gets ronned instead. Satoha uses her to deal blow one of Suzu's fuse. Her performance is described as "lackluster".
Chikako Himori (桧森 誓子, Himori Chikako)
A third year student who plays the Sergeant position. She is tall and has blond hair, with thick eyebrows that have a "cross" pattern. She is a beginner at mahjong but Hiroko Funakubo stated that she had put in some effort to get better. She tends to call tiles to get into an empty tenpai so that she won't get the noten penalty.
Yuan Iwadate (岩館 揺杏, Iwadate Yuan)
A second year who plays the Lieutenant position. She has black, unruly hair which is tied into a pony tail. She also wears a jacket. She likes to sew and she was the one who sew Maya's idol outfit. She is a relatively weak player, only winning one small hand toward the end. During the semi-final match, Usuzan is in critical condition and had initially planned to manipulate and use Hisa to score points to have Usuzan get a higher score but failed when Hisa started her.
Yukiko Maya (真屋 由暉子, Maya Yukiko)
A first year who plays the Vice-Captain position. She has long dark hair, but is notably shorter and has the biggest breasts compared to the other Usuzan girls. She is one of Usuzan's players who plays at a national-level. She has an unreserved nature and does what she wants therefore she does not mind wearing idol clothes or becoming the next idol. When she was in middle school, she was a loner and was being bullied without her knowing by her classmates but was helped by the remaining Usuzan team members to come out of her shell. She joined Usuzan because of them and was groomed by the Usuzan girls to become one of the next mahjong idols. Coming from a Christian school, her ability shows this and activates only one time per day. When she uses her left hand to pick up tiles, a Jehovah symbol will appear. she will quote a bible verse and her hand will be completed with shining tsumo- her tsumo having a heavy payout hand with a mangan as the minimum points that she can score. Aside from her ability, she is a naturally great mahjong player and is always seen to be on tenpai for expensive-scoring hands, even managing a kokushi tenpai against Megan.
Sawaya Shishihara (獅子原 爽, Shishihara Sawaya)
A third year student who plays the Captain position. She has red hair and ties it into a sad ponytail. Her eyes have a triangle pattern on them. She is aiming to turn Maya into the next mahjong idol like Mizuhara-pro. She is one of Usuzan's players who plays at a national-level, however, it seems that she is on a higher level than Maya.

=== Kentani High School ===
Hyougo Prefecture. One of the contenders by bringing one of the team's score below zero during its first match round.

Miyuki Tsubakino (椿野 美幸, Tsubakino Miyuki)
Voiced by: Shion Hirota
A third year student who plays the Vanguard position. She has a yellow-whitish bob cut hair.
Sumiko Yorifuji (依藤 澄子, Yorifuji Sumiko)
Voiced by: Yūko Mori
A second year student who plays the Sergeant position. She has green hair and always looks like she is not confident.
Kozue Furuzuka (古塚 梢, Furuzuka Kozue)
Voiced by: Natsumi Takamori
A third year student, plays the Lieutenant position and Kentani High's club president. She plays defensively consistently throughout the match. She entrusted their two new recruits as the Vice-Captain and the Captain despite having more experience.
Yuuka Morigaki (森垣 友香, Morigaki Yūka)
Voiced by: Naomi Shindō
A first year student who plays the Vice-Captain position. She used to live abroad before going to Kentani and she does not know much about Japanese customs. She managed to hit a dealer's baiman and scored the most points in the Vice-Captain position.
Riko Yasufuku (安福 莉子, Yasufuku Riko)
Voiced by: Yuiko Tatsumi
A first year student who plays the Captain's position. She has a flower headband. She paid into Shizuno on the final hand causing Achiga to advance into the next round instead of Kentani.

=== Koshigaya Girl's High School ===
Saitama Prefecture. Koshigaya had never advanced into the second round in its previous four appearances in the Inter High until this year.

Sophia Arai (新井 ソフィア, Arai Sofia)
Voiced by: Megumi Nakajima
A third year who plays the Vanguard position. A half-Japanese girl with dark skin and sports a weave.
Hanako Asami (浅見 花子, Asami Hanako)
Voiced by: Mariko Honda
A third year who plays the Sergeant position. She wears a skater's hat and ear piercing. She speaks in a skater slang.
Shiori Mizumura (水村 史織, Mizumura Shiori)
Voiced by: Rie Yamaguchi
A first year who plays the Lieutenant position. She is always seen to be fixing her appearance.
Tamago Utsugi (宇津木 玉子, Utsugi Tamago)
Voiced by: Kei Shindō
A third year who plays the Vice-Captain position. She have been drawn with different eyes who goes up and down in the manga, and wears a clown hat. She was responsible for losing the most points for Koshigaya. Funakubo did not think she was much of a threat.
Keiko Yagihara (八木原 景子, Yagihara Keiko)
Voiced by: Megumi Takamoto
A second year who plays the captain position, and was able to bring her team through the first round for the first time in five years. In her second round match she was tasked with a 50000 point comeback, but was not able to get anywhere. Her final damaten hand actually sealed her defeat because it didn't give her enough points. She wears a headband with a sword attach to it.

== Commentators ==
Yasuko Fujita (藤田 靖子, Fujita Yasuko)
Voiced by: Masumi Asano
Played by: Natsuna Watanabe
Fujita is a professional mahjong player who is first introduced when Hisa invites her to play against Saki and Nodoka at Mako's grandfather's mahjong parlor. She is a strong player, but has a good sense of opponents with great power, such as Koromo and Saki. She acts as a commentator for mahjong tournaments, often seen eating a bowl of katsudon, where she provides some unique insight into how the players play. While she respects how Koromo plays the game, having lost to her once, she cannot help but tease her small stature. She has mistakenly referred to Yumi Kajiki as Tsuruga's mahjong club's president on multiple occasions.
Sukoya Kokaji (小鍛治 健夜, Kokaji Sukoya)
Voiced by: Saori Goto
Played by: Ayu Higashi
A professional mahjong player and works as a commentator for the All Japan High School Mahjong Tournament along with Kouko Fukuyo. She is the youngest person to hold eight mahjong tournament trophies. She had previously won the mahjong nationals ten years ago (defeating Harue in the process), though now she doesn't participate in many tournaments and thus carries a low ranking.
Kouko Fukuyo (福与 恒子, Fukuyo Kōko)
Voiced by: Ai Nonaka
An announcer who commentates alongside Sukoya. She is rather energetic and tends to embarrass Sukoya over the air a lot.
Eri Hariu (針生 えり, Hariu Eri)
Voiced by: Yumiko Fujita
Eri is an announcer who commentates alongside Uta. She makes her play-by-play calls in a somewhat serious manner, thus she becomes annoyed at Uta's flightiness in answering her questions.
Uta Mihirogi (三尋木 咏, Mihirogi Uta)
Voiced by: Yuki Matsuoka
Uta is a color commentator for the inter-high and a professional mahjong player. She wears a kimono and carries a paper fan. She is also currently the vanguard for the All-Japan team. She is paired with Eri Hariu and they are main commentator team in Saki Achiga Hen episode of side A. She is very knowledgeable but prone to be a bit flighty, commonly making an observation, only to say "I don't really know" soon afterward.

== Others ==
Kazue Nanpo (南浦 数絵, Nanpo Kazue)
Voiced by: Yuko Sanpei
Kazue is a student from Hirataki High School who enters the individual tournament. Similar to Yūki, her play is most powerful during the south wind rounds. Her name is a pun on kaze (wind) and wind seems to blow behind her whenever she awakens and her surname is a reference for her strength during the south wind round. She is a strong player in a weak school, and entered the individual tournament to prove the strength of her grandfather's play style without being held back by her teammates. She placed fifth in the Nagano Prefectural Individual Tournament.
Kei Arakawa (荒川 憩, Arakawa Kei)
Voiced by: Marie Miyake
A second year student at Sangamaki High. She is one of the Individual participants hailing from North Osaka. She wears a nurses outfit as a school uniform. The second placer in the Individual Tournament last year just after Miyanaga Teru. She is one of the few people that can put up a good fight against Shiraitodai. Kei is very friendly and was the only one who accepted to help Achiga when they called for friendly battle. During the final Individual tournament last year, even though she was just a first year, she had a smile on her face throughout the match despite the match being dominated by Teru, which gave Satoha a strong impression. Although, considered one of last year's 'mahjong monsters' next to Koromo and Jindai, Sangamaki High did not advance to the Nationals in the team tournament as Kei could not carry the team by herself and ultimately lost in combined power against Senriyama.
Youko Kadomatsu (門松 葉子, Kadomatsu Yōko)
Voiced by: Shiori Mikami
Yōko is a second-year high school student, and the vanguard of the Imamiya Girls' High School mahjong team. She loses to Yūki in the first round of the local mahjong tournament. Later on, she takes Nodoka's stuffed penguin as a prank. She soon regrets the prank, apologizing to Nodoka along with Mai.
Mai Tanaka (田中 舞, Tanaka Mai)
Voiced by: Yuka Saitō
Mai is a third-year high school student, and the vice-captain of the Imamiya Girls' High School mahjong team. She loses to Nodoka in the first round of the local mahjong tournament. Along with Yōko, she takes away Nodoka's stuffed penguin. The two soon regret the prank and both apologize to Nodoka.
Maho Yumeno (夢乃 マホ, Yumeno Maho)
A second year junior-high student at Nodoka's old school, one of her underclassman. Her ability is to mimic other mahjong player's playing styles, such as Saki's rinshan kaihō. However, she can only mimic a specific ability once a day, and she otherwise makes a lot of amateur mistakes, in spite of having practiced for a long time. She is invited to Kiyosumi's training camp both to invoke fear into Saki and help Mako deal with beginners.
Hiroko Murohashi (室橋 裕子, Murohashi Hiroko)
A third year junior-high student at the same school as Maho.

== See also ==
- Saki (manga)
- List of Saki episodes
