= Aguri Igarashi =

Japanese manga artist

Aguri Igarashi (五十嵐あぐり, Igarashi Aguri; born April 12, 1975) is a Japanese manga artist. She is the illustrator for best selling manga series, Bamboo Blade.

She has also collaborated with Ritz Kobayashi on Saki Achiga-hen episode of Side-A

== Bibliography ==
- Bamboo Blade (バンブーブレード, Banbū Burēdo) (2004, Square Enix); (2009, Yen Press)
- Saki: Achiga-hen episode of Side-A (咲 Saki 阿知賀編 episode of Side-A) (2011, Square Enix)
