= Saki (manga) =

Japanese manga series

- Cover art of the first Japanese manga volume featuring the title character Saki Miyanaga

咲-Saki-
- Genre: Sports (mahjong)
- Manga
- Written by: Ritz Kobayashi
- Published by: Square Enix
- English publisher: NA: Yen Press
- Magazine: Young Gangan
- Original run: February 3, 2006 – present
- Volumes: 27
- Anime television series
- Directed by: Manabu Ono; Kenji Setō (assistant)
- Produced by: Yūichirō Takahata; Yūka Sakurai; Takao Aoki; Takuto Kumatani
- Written by: Tatsuhiko Urahata
- Music by: Takeshi Watanabe
- Studio: Gonzo; Picture Magic
- Licensed by: Crunchyroll
- Original network: TXN (TV Tokyo)
- Original run: April 6, 2009 – September 28, 2009
- Episodes: 25
- Video game

Saki Portable
- Developer: Alchemist
- Genre: Mahjong
- Platform: PlayStation Portable
- Released: JP: March 25, 2010
- Manga

Saki Biyori
- Written by: Saya Kiyoshi
- Published by: Square Enix
- Magazine: Young Gangan; Big Gangan
- Original run: June 17, 2011 – March 24, 2018
- Volumes: 7
- Manga

Saki Achiga-hen episode of Side-A
- Written by: Ritz Kobayashi
- Illustrated by: Aguri Igarashi
- Published by: Square Enix
- Magazine: Monthly Shōnen Gangan
- Original run: September 2011 – present
- Volumes: 9
- Anime television series

Saki Achiga-hen episode of Side-A
- Directed by: Manabu Ono; Kenji Setō (assistant)
- Produced by: Yūichirō Takahata; Yūka Sakurai; Ryōsuke Ōno
- Written by: Tatsuhiko Urahata
- Music by: Takeshi Watanabe
- Studio: Studio Gokumi
- Licensed by: Crunchyroll
- Original network: TV Tokyo, TV Osaka, TV Aichi, TV Setouchi, TV Hokkaido, TVQ Kyushu Broadcasting, AT-X
- Original run: April 9, 2012 – May 25, 2013
- Episodes: 16
- Video game

Saki Achiga-hen episode of Side-A Portable
- Developer: Alchemist
- Genre: Mahjong
- Platform: PlayStation Portable
- Released: August 29, 2013
- Manga

Side Story of Saki: Shinohayu the Dawn of Age
- Written by: Ritz Kobayashi
- Illustrated by: Aguri Igarashi
- Published by: Square Enix
- Magazine: Big Gangan
- Original run: September 25, 2013 – present
- Volumes: 16
- Anime television series

Saki: The Nationals
- Directed by: Manabu Ono; Kenji Setō (assistant)
- Produced by: Yūichirō Takahata; Yūka Sakurai; Ryōsuke Ōno
- Written by: Tatsuhiko Urahata
- Music by: Takeshi Watanabe
- Studio: Studio Gokumi
- Licensed by: Crunchyroll
- Original run: January 5, 2014 – April 6, 2014
- Episodes: 13
- Original video animation

Saki Biyori
- Directed by: Manabu Ono; Kenji Setō (assistant)
- Produced by: Yūichirō Takahata; Yūka Sakurai; Ryōsuke Ōno
- Written by: Tatsuhiko Urahata
- Music by: Takeshi Watanabe
- Studio: Studio Gokumi
- Licensed by: Crunchyroll
- Released: July 25, 2015
- Manga

Toki
- Written by: Meki Meki
- Published by: Square Enix
- Magazine: Big Gangan
- Original run: June 25, 2016 – present
- Volumes: 10
- Television drama
- Directed by: Yuichi Onuma
- Written by: Hayashi Mori
- Studio: MBS, Amuse Inc., Dub Corporation
- Original network: TBS
- Original run: December 4, 2016 – January 8, 2017
- Episodes: 5
- Live-action film
- Saki (film)
- Television drama

Saki Achiga-hen episode of side-A
- Original run: December 3, 2017 – January 7, 2018
- Episodes: 5
- Live-action film

Saki Achiga-hen episode of side-A
- Released: January 20, 2018

Saki (咲-Saki-) is a Japanese manga series written and illustrated by Ritz Kobayashi. The story revolves around a first-year high school girl named Saki Miyanaga who is brought into the competitive world of mahjong by another first-year, Nodoka Haramura. The manga has been serialized in Square Enix's Young Gangan since February 3, 2006, and is licensed in English by Yen Press. A 25-episode anime adaptation by Gonzo aired between April and September 2009 on TV Tokyo.

A side-story manga illustrated by Aguri Igarashi, Saki Achiga-hen episode of Side-A (咲 Saki 阿知賀編 episode of Side-A), was serialized between the September 2011 and April 2013 issues of Monthly Shōnen Gangan, with an anime adaptation by Studio Gokumi airing between April and July 2012, with four additional episodes airing between December 2012 and May 2013. A third anime series, Saki: The Nationals (咲-Saki-全国編, Saki: Zenkoku-hen), also by Studio Gokumi, aired between January and April 2014. A spin-off series to Saki, Side story of -Saki-: Shinohayu the dawn of age, began serialization in Big Gangan from September 2013. A gag manga series by Saya Kiyoshi, Saki Biyori, began serialization in Young Gangan from June 2011, with an original video animation released on July 25, 2015. Another spin-off manga illustrated by Meki Meki, Toki, began serialization in Big Gangan from June 2016. A live-action television series aired between December 2016 and January 2017, and a live-action film opened in Japan in February 2017.

== Plot ==
Saki Miyanaga, a freshman in high school, does not like mahjong because her family would always force her to play it and punish her regardless of the outcome of the game. Due to this, she learned how to keep her score at zero, neither winning nor losing, a skill said to be more difficult than actually consistently winning. However, her friend from middle school, completely unaware of such circumstances, convinces her to visit the school's small mahjong club upon entering Kiyosumi High School. After the club discovers her ability, they recruit her permanently and convince her to win instead of breaking even. She easily does so with her skill and discovers a new love for mahjong, along with a friendship with her fellow club member, Nodoka Haramura. This leads the team to enter the prefecture's high school mahjong tournament with the goal of reaching the national high school competition.

The side-story manga, Saki: Achiga-hen episode of Side-A, is based in the area around Yoshino, Nara and follows a girl named Shizuno Takakamo, an old friend of Nodoka's, who used to be in Achiga Girls Academy's mahjong club together. A few years after the club disbanded and the two split up, Shizuno spots Nodoka on television as she makes her stride in mahjong. Wanting to see her old friend again, Shizuno decides to revive the Achiga Mahjong Club so that she can face against Nodoka in the inter-high national championships. The spin-off, Shinohayu the dawn of age, shows the childhood of the various pro mahjong players in the series, focusing on a girl named Shino Shiratsuki who enters the world of competitive mahjong to seek out her mother who disappeared one day.

== Media ==
=== Manga ===
Written and drawn by Ritz Kobayashi, the Saki manga series is serialized in Square Enix's biweekly seinen manga magazine, Young Gangan. Serialization began on February 3, 2006. Square Enix has collected the chapters in tankōbon volumes. The first volume was released on December 25, 2006, and as of July 2023, 24 volumes have been released. Yen Press have licensed the series in English for digital release.

A 4-koma series written by Saya Kiyoshi, Saki Biyori (咲日和), was serialized in Young Gangan between the June 17, 2011, and August 17, 2012, issues. It was also serialized in Big Gangan between the October 25, 2011, and March 24, 2018, issues. The first volume was released on March 24, 2012; seven volumes have been released as of March 24, 2018.

A spin-off manga series written by Kobayashi and illustrated by Aguri Igarashi, Saki Achiga-hen episode of Side-A (咲 Saki 阿知賀編 episode of Side-A), originally ran in Square Enix's Shōnen Gangan magazine between the September 2011 and April 2013 issues. It was compiled into six volumes released between March 24, 2012, and August 24, 2013. It resumed serialization on March 23, 2020 and two new volumes were added in 2021. Nine books have been published as of September 2022.

Another spin-off manga titled Side Story of Saki: Shinohayu the Dawn of Age began serialization in Big Gangan from September 25, 2013. As of July 2023 it has 16 volumes published. A spin-off of Achiga-hen illustrated by Meki Meki, Toki (怜-Toki), began serialization in Big Gangan on June 25, 2016. There have been ten tankōbon volumes as of July 2023.

A series of parody one-shots titled Ritz (立, Ritsu), which detail the fictionalized backstory behind Kobayashi's serialization of Saki, have been written and illustrated by Hideki Owada and published in Young Gangan. Another spin-off by Meki Meki, titled Someya Mako no Jansō Meshi (染谷まこの雀荘メシ, Mako Someya's Mahjong Parlor Food), began serialization in Young Gangan on June 7, 2019 and has 3 volumes as of September 2022. Saki to Final Fantasy XIV, a manga drawn by Saya Kiyoshi in collaboration with the Final Fantasy XIV video game, launched on Square Enix's Manga Up! app on January 22, 2021.

=== Anime ===
An anime adaptation of Saki was announced in the 24th issue of Young Gangan. The series was adapted by Gonzo, directed by Manabu Ono, and written by Tatsuhiko Urahata, From episode fifteen onwards, animation production was done by Picture Magic. On January 31, 2009, a 105-second promotional video began streaming on the anime's official website. The series aired on TV Tokyo and its affiliate stations between April 6 and September 28, 2009.

A 12-episode anime adaptation of Saki: Achiga-hen aired in Japan between April 9 and July 2, 2012. Ono and Urahata return as director and writer and animation production is done by Studio Gokumi. Four additional episodes aired on AT-X between December 24, 2012, and May 25, 2013. A short anime was included with a Blu-ray boxset released on March 18, 2015. A third Saki anime series, titled Saki: The Nationals (咲-Saki-全国編, Saki: Zenkoku-hen), aired 13 episodes between January 5 and April 6, 2014. Ono and Urahata again return as director and writer under Studio Gokumi. Each of the series are simulcasted by Crunchyroll. An original video animation of Saki Biyori, also animated by Studio Gokumi, was bundled with the 14th manga volume of Saki on July 25, 2015.

=== Music ===
Saki uses five pieces of theme music, two opening themes and three ending themes. Saki: Achiga-hen episode of side-A uses four pieces of theme music, two opening themes and two ending themes. Saki: The Nationals currently uses one opening theme and two ending themes, one of which has variations featuring different artists.

Opening themes
"Glossy:MMM" by Miyuki Hashimoto (Saki, episodes 2-14, ending theme of episodes 1, 25, The Nationals ep 13)
"Bloooomin'" by Little Non (Saki, episodes 15-25)
"Miracle Rush" by StylipS (Saki: Achiga-hen, episodes 2-12, ending theme of episodes 1, 16)
"TSU・BA・SA" by StylipS (Saki: Achiga-hen, episodes 13-15)
"New Sparks!" by Miyuki Hashimoto (Saki: The Nationals, episodes 2-13, ending theme of episode 1)
"Dramatic Cycle" (ドラマティック＊サイクル, Doramatikku Saikuru) by StylipS (Saki Biyori)
Ending themes
"Netsuretsu Kangei Wonderland" (熱烈歓迎わんだーらんど, Enthusiastic Welcome Wonderland) by Kana Ueda, Ami Koshimizu, Rie Kugimiya, Ryōko Shiraishi, and Shizuka Itō (Saki, episodes 2-6, 8-9, 11-14)
"Zankoku na Negai no Naka de" (残酷な願いの中で, Inside a Cruel Wish) by Kana Ueda and Ami Koshimizu (Saki, episodes 7, 10, 16, 18, 22)
"Shikakui Uchū de Matteru yo" (四角い宇宙で待ってるよ, Waiting For You in the World of Rectangles) by Kana Ueda, Ami Koshimizu, Rie Kugimiya, Ryōko Shiraishi, and Shizuka Itō (Saki, episodes 15, 17, 19-21, 23-24)
"Square Panic Serenade" performed by Aoi Yūki, Nao Tōyama, Kana Hanazawa, Mako and Yumi Uchiyama (Saki: Achiga-hen, episodes 2, 5-7, 12)
"Futuristic Player" by Miyuki Hashimoto (Saki: Achiga-hen, episodes 3, 4, 8-11, 14-15)
"True Gate" by Miyuki Hashimoto (Saki: The Nationals, episodes 2, 7, 9)
"Kono Te ga Kiseki o Eranderu " (この手が奇跡を選んでる, This Hand Will Draw a Miracle)
- "Miyamori Girls High School ver." (宮守女子高校 ver., Miyamori Joshi Kōkō ver.) by Juri Nagatsuma, Mariko Mizuno, Moe Toyota, Rina Satou, and Maaya Uchida (Saki: The Nationals, episodes 3, 8)
- "Eisui Girls High School ver." (永水女子高校 ver., Eisui Joshi Kōkō ver.) by Saori Hayami, Chinatsu Akasaki, Kaori Mizuhashi, Ayumi Tsuji, and Sayaka Ohara (Saki: The Nationals, episodes 4, 6, 10)
- "Himematsu High School ver." (姫松高校 ver, Himematsu Kōkō ver.) by Arisa Date, Haruka Yoshimura, Satsumi Matsuda, Mariko Nakatsu, and Minako Kotobuki (Saki: The Nationals, episodes 5, 12)
"Koromo Biyori" (ころもびより, Koromo Days) by Kaori Fukuhara, Minori Chihara, Ai Shimizu, Ayuru Ōhashi, and Yuko Kaida (Saki Biyori, ep 1)

For the PSP game, the respective opening and ending themes are "Kimi ga Waratte Kureta kara, Kyō mo Yume no Tane o Makō (Kimi Tane)" (君が笑ってくれたから、今日も夢の種を蒔こう。-キミたね-; lit. 'Because You Make Me Laugh, The Seeds of Dreams Will Bloom Today As Well') and "Bakuhatsu Shidō Revolution" (爆発始動レボリューション, Bakuhatsu Shidō Reboryūshon; lit. 'Exploding Startup Revolution'), both performed by Little Non. For the Achiga-hen PSP game, the opening theme is "Moment of Glory" by Miyuki Hashimoto.

=== Live-action ===
A four episode live-action television series began airing in Japan on December 4, 2016, and a live-action film debuted in Japan on February 3, 2017.

=== Video games ===
A mahjong video game was unveiled at the 2009 Tokyo International Anime Fair, and later released on April 22, 2009. Gonzo collaborated with Sega in developing the arcade mahjong video game based on the series, and it is based on the MJ4 Ver.C network mahjong game. The game includes a Saki Single Mode, where the player can play with Saki characters instead of matching-up with opponents online. Another mahjong video game was developed by Alchemist for the PlayStation Portable, and was released in March 2010 in Japan under the name Saki Portable. A sequel, Saki Achiga-hen episode of Side-A Portable, was released on August 29, 2013. Another sequel, Saki Zenkoku-hen, was released by Kaga Create on September 17, 2015, for PlayStation Vita. On December 22, 2016, Entergram re-released the game as Saki Zenkoku-hen Plus, with the latest update folded into it. In 2021 and 2022, popular online Mahjong client Mahjong Soul released a two-phase limited time collab allowing you to unlock and play as various characters from the anime.
