= List of Fly Me to the Moon episodes =

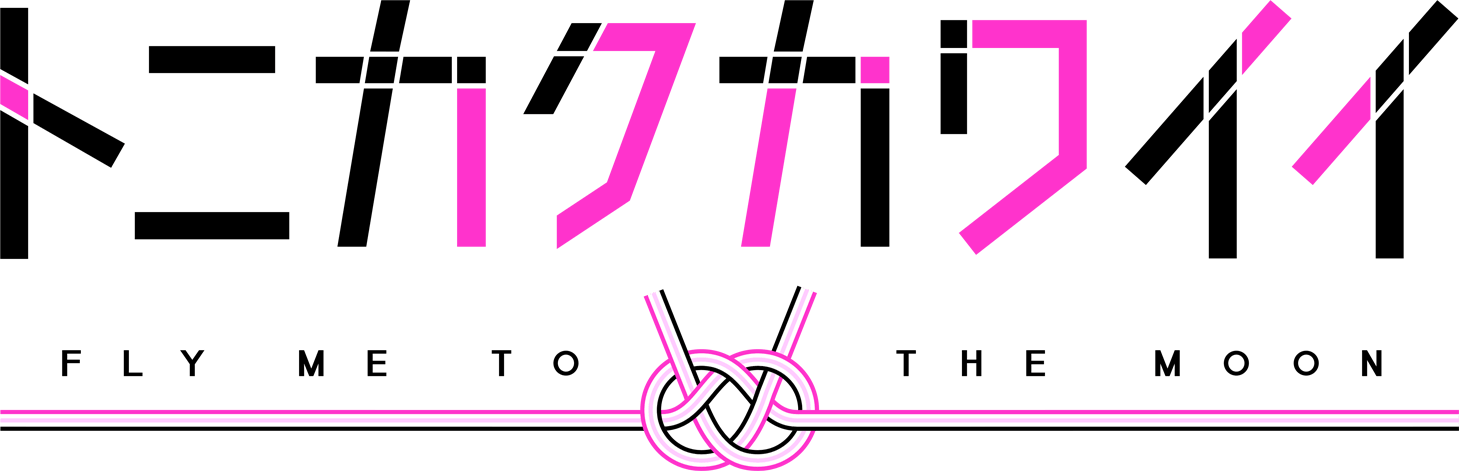
Japanese anime logo

Fly Me to the Moon is an anime television series based on the titular manga series by Kenjiro Hata. The series was first was announced on March 4, 2020, and was produced by Seven Arcs and directed by Hiroshi Ikehata, with Kazuho Hyodo writing the scripts, Masakatsu Sasaki designing the characters, and Endō composing the music. It ran for 12 episodes from October 3 to December 19, 2020, on Tokyo MX, ytv and BS-NTV. (Note: Tokyo MX listed the series premiere at 25:05 on October 2, 2020, which is October 3 at 1:05 a.m. JST.) Akari Kitō, as her character Tsukasa Yuzaki, performed the opening theme "Koi no Uta" (恋のうた; "Love Song"), while KanoeRana performed the ending theme "Tsuki to Hoshizora" (月と星空; "Moon and Starry Sky").

Crunchyroll streamed the series in selective territories as part of its Crunchyroll Originals label. An English dub premiered on November 20, 2020; an English dub for the second season premiered on the same day of its premiere in Japan. Crunchyroll also streamed the "Uniform" special episode and High School Days. While In Southeast Asia, Plus Media Networks Asia licensed the first season and aired it on Aniplus Asia.

An original video animation (OVA) was released on August 18, 2021. On November 6, 2021, it was announced that the series would have a new episode and a second season, with the staff and cast returning to reprise their respective roles. The special episode, titled "Uniform" (制服, Seifuku), premiered online on November 22, 2022.

The second season aired from April 8 to June 23, 2023. (Note: Tokyo MX listed the season premiere at 25:05 on April 7, 2023, which is April 8 at 1:05 a.m.) Akari Kitō once again performed the opening theme "Setsuna no Chikai" (刹那の誓い; "Oath of a Moment"), as well the ending theme "Yoru no Katasumi" (夜のかたすみ; "In the Corner of the Night").

A four-episode original net animation (ONA), titled Tonikawa: Over the Moon for You: High School Days, was released from July 12 to August 23, 2023.

Anime Limited released the series on a "Collector's Blu-ray" edition on November 25, 2024, and released the standard edition on December 9. Shout! Studios released the "Collector's Blu-ray" edition in North America on December 17, 2024.

== Series overview ==
Season	Episodes	Originally released	
Season	Episodes	First released	Last released
1	12	October 3, 2020	December 19, 2020
2	12	April 8, 2023	June 24, 2023

== Episodes ==
=== Season 1 (2020) ===
No.	Title (Note: All English episode titles taken from Crunchyroll.)	Directed by	Written by	Original release date
1	"Marriage"; Transliteration: "Kekkon" (Japanese: 結婚)	Akira Mano	Kazuho Hyōdō	October 3, 2020
On a snowy winter night, Nasa Yuzaki is lying on the street bleeding. During the time he believes he is going to die, he recalls his life, remembering how he was ridiculed for his unusual name and how he devoted his life to studying, wanting to attend an elite school. But before he was set to take the entrance exam, he was hit by a truck when he crossed the street trying to speak to a girl named Tsukasa Tsukuyomi. However, Nasa survived due to her intervention. After regaining consciousness, Nasa chased after Tsukasa, wanting to go out with her as gratitude for saving his life, and Tsukasa agreed only if they got married when they were old enough to do so. After getting discharged from the hospital, he took the entrance exam the following year, but decided to work instead of attend high school, hoping to come across Tsukasa. Shortly after turning 18, Tsukasa shows up at his apartment to fill out the marriage registration and submit it to the bureau to make the marriage official.
2	"The First Night"; Transliteration: "Shoya" (Japanese: 初夜)	Toshikatsu Tokoro	Kazuho Hyōdō	October 10, 2020
Tsukasa has brought her belongings in a backpack, terrifying Nasa, who is nervous to have a girl sleep in his apartment. Nasa tries to figure out where Tsukasa will sleep, since he has a twin-size bed only big enough for one person. They go shopping for a bed and return with a futon for Tsukasa to sleep on. During the night, Tsukasa, who is a reckless sleeper, moves constantly, and gets up to drink some water. Still asleep, she inadvertently pulls Nasa's comforter off his bed when she returns, leaving Nasa in the cold for the rest of the night. After waking up the next morning, Tsukasa prepares breakfast while telling Nasa to not be formal with her.
3	"Sisters"; Transliteration: "Shimai" (Japanese: 姉妹)	Yasuhiko Seyama	Kazuho Hyōdō	October 17, 2020
With the apartment lacking a bathtub, Tsukasa and Nasa head out to a bathhouse after having breakfast. Nasa introduces Tsukasa to Kaname Arisugawa, Nasa's former underclassman who runs the bathhouse along with her older sister Aya. After Kaname enters the men’s side, she asks Nasa about his relationship and expresses her disapproval, while demanding him to make Tsukasa happy. Over on the women's side, Tsukasa meets Aya, who attempts to provide good customer service, by scrubbing Tsukasa’s back. After bathing, Tsukasa gets to know more about Aya as she was Tsukasa's classmate in middle school. After the two pass a chapel with an ongoing wedding, Nasa rushes off to take care of an errand while asking Tsukasa to return home. On the way back home, a girl from inside a limousine watches Tsukasa, calling her sister.
4	"Promise"; Transliteration: "Yakusoku" (Japanese: 約束)	Shunji Yoshida	Yū Satō	October 24, 2020
Tsukasa returns to the apartment, and shortly after arriving, her foster sister Chitose Kaginoji knocks on the door after tailing her. Chitose is informed Tsukasa is married, much to her disbelief. Nasa returns home and is greeted by Chitose, who kidnaps him and takes him to her family's mansion after discovering he is Tsukasa's husband. She comes up with a scheme to break up the marriage by having her maids Charlotte and Aurora use tabloid journalism against him. While Chitose argues with the maids, Nasa slips out and tries to hide, but is found by Charlotte. While trying to get Nasa to submit, Charlotte accidentally breaks the nitrogen casing that preserves Tsukasa's precious moon rock, and Nasa uses his knowledge to fix it temporarily. Chitose then lashes out at Nasa about him not really knowing who Tsukasa is and claiming she is the only person who can make her dream come true. Aurora creates a scandalous photo, but Tsukasa arrives to confiscate it. Tsukasa and Nasa escape the mansion through a secret passage, finding themselves in a church, where they share their first kiss.
5	"Rings"; Transliteration: "Yubiwa" (Japanese: 指輪)	Yūsuke Onoda	Gō Zappa	October 31, 2020
Nasa and Tsukasa visit an electronics store to shop for a TV. Later at the bathhouse, Nasa tells Kaname about his verbal commitment to Tsukasa, which she tells him it is important for him to buy an engagement ring. After leaving the bathhouse, the two stop by at a nearby park and kiss while Charlotte and Aurora secretly observe them. At night, Nasa learns the difference between engagement and wedding rings. Afterwards, Nasa insists he has to buy a diamond ring. The next day, they go shopping in Omotesando, and Nasa is shocked at the price tag for a Honey Winston diamond ring, but is talked into buying one until Tsukasa drags him out of the store. Tsukasa tells Nasa she does not want him to spend his savings on a ring. Instead, they stop by at a jeweler in Okachimachi with affordable diamond rings but the price is still too much to get Nasa to understand. Eventually, they end up buying a pair of cheap diamond rings and Tsukasa expresses her appreciation on their way home.
6	"News"; Transliteration: "Hōkoku" (Japanese: 報告)	Shigeru Fukase	Kazuho Hyōdō	November 7, 2020
One night, Tsukasa rolls into Nasa's bed after drinking some water. This prompts Nasa to think about moving into a bigger apartment the next morning, despite Tsukasa being fine with their current living arrangements. At night, Nasa makes a pitch about the benefits of moving to Tsukasa, but realizes he needs his parents to be his guarantor. Having not informed them about the marriage, Nasa calls his parents to inform them he married the girl he had told to them about. The next day, Nasa chats with his mother, who asks them to come visit them in Nara. Tsukasa decides she wants to turn this trip into their honeymoon with a stop in Kyoto. Tsukasa buys a camera, and at night they set out on their trip on a bus with Chitose and her maids tailing them.
7	"Trip"; Transliteration: "Ryokō" (Japanese: 旅行)	Daiei Andō	Yū Satō	November 14, 2020
The bus makes a stop at a service area with Chitose and her maids looking for a way to break up Tsukasa's relationship with Nasa. At the service area, Tsukasa tries the lime udon she heard about through a TV show, but finds it disappointing. Cameramen from a TV station enter the service area, prompting Tsukasa and Nasa to quickly return to the bus, not wanting their relationship to go public. The next morning, the bus arrives in Kyoto. Chitose manages to separate the two by having her maids take Tsukasa to the manga museum she had been wanting to visit, leaving Nasa to go on a date with Chitose as a test to determine if he is worthy of being Tsukasa's husband. While Nasa admits he does not know about Tsukasa as Chitose does, he manages to convince her by talking about the accident and various mathematical principles. Chitose and her maids return to Tokyo, though Nasa is not convinced Chitose has given up on sabotaging their relationship.
8	"Parents"; Transliteration: "Oyako" (Japanese: 親子)	Akira Mano	Yū Satō	November 21, 2020
Tsukasa and Nasa arrive in Nara to visit Nasa's mother Kanoka and father Enishi, as Nasa explains he was raised in Tokyo and his parents moved to Nara for his father's archaeological excavation. As Nasa takes a bath, Tsukasa talks with Enishi in private. The next morning, Tsukasa is brought into Enishi's office, which is filled with books, and she expresses her interest in history. After breakfast, Tsukasa and Nasa go sightseeing in Nara, and one stop is the site of the former Heijō Palace. During their conversation the previous night, Enishi had thanked Tsukasa for saving Nasa’s life, and entrusted her to look after him. Tsukasa and Nasa leave Nara at night and arrive in Tokyo the next morning, only to find their apartment burned down.
9	"Daily Life"; Transliteration: "Nichijō" (Japanese: 日常)	Toshikatsu Tokoro	Kazuho Hyōdō	November 28, 2020
Unaffected by the incident, Nasa explains to Tsukasa all his important papers and belongings are secure in a bank, while his important information is stored in the cloud. They then decide to head to the bathhouse. When Nasa explains the situation to Kaname, she suggests he and Tsukasa stay at the bathhouse until they find a new place. Kaname wonders how Aya is going to react given she has a crush on Nasa. It is revealed Aya is still oblivious about Nasa's marriage until her mother brings it up. Several days later, Nasa and Tsukasa head to the laundromat. They then head to Harajuku to buy Tsukasa some new clothes.
10	"The Way Home"; Transliteration: "Ieji" (Japanese: 家路)	Akira Katō	Kazuho Hyōdō	December 5, 2020
Tsukasa and Nasa settle into their temporary home, and during dinner, Nasa complements Tsukasa's cooking. The next day, Nasa's landlord offers him a unit in the new apartment complex under construction on the site where his old apartment burned down for the same rate. Tsukasa and Nasa check out the model for the new apartment, located in a luxury high-rise hotel, and are impressed by its amenities. However, they were sent to the wrong one after all. After visiting the luxury hotel apartment, Tsukasa lets Nasa know her home is wherever he is. Later, Tsukasa decides to help out with chores at the bathhouse, and Kaname thanks Tsukasa for saving Nasa. At night, Tsukasa and Nasa go grocery shopping, and on the way back they take a detour to Otogi Park to have a romantic moment together.
11	"Friends"; Transliteration: "Yūjin" (Japanese: 友人)	Shunji Yoshida	Yū Satō	December 12, 2020
Chitose and her maids discover Nasa and Tsukasa's apartment had burned down. When Chitose asks Tsukasa where she is living now, Tsukasa lies in order to get away from her. When Tsukasa arrives at the bathhouse, she notices several video game consoles and Nasa staring at a takoyaki plate. Once he learns what it is, Nasa decides to throw a takoyaki party. Just then, Chitose arrives with her maids, and attempts to bribe Tsukasa by promising to buy a few consoles, which Aya overhears. Aya then wonders if Tsukasa can really cook. After she enjoys Tsukasa's cooking, everyone plays Street Fighter V: Champion Edition. Tsukasa, Aya, and Chitose later agree to have a tournament where Nasa has to do anything the winner asks. After Aya wins it, Tsukasa decides to play the original Street Fighter against her, which Tsukasa easily wins. As such, they form a bond. Once the party is over, Tsukasa kisses Nasa, as she planned if she won the tournament.
12	"Husband and Wife"; Transliteration: "Fūfu" (Japanese: 夫婦)	Shigeru Fukase	Kazuho Hyōdō	December 19, 2020
Nasa overexerts himself doing work and catches a cold. Despite insisting he is fine, Tsukasa tells him to rest. Nasa, concerned with infecting Tsukasa, feels guilty for her having to worry over him. She assures him it is fine, and cares for him over the night. Nasa wakes up the next morning feeling better, much to Tsukasa's relief, who reveals she was actually worried for him. Sometime later, Tsukasa and Nasa put on yukatas and attend the summer festival. There, they eat takoyaki, meet Aya and Chitose at the goldfish scooping game, and pray at the shrine. The night concludes with Tsukasa and Nasa watching the fireworks show with Kaname, Aya, Chitose, and her maids.
12.5	"Flashbacks"; Transliteration: "Kaisō" (Japanese: 回想)	N/A	N/A	December 26, 2020
A recap episode summarizing the series.
OVA	"SNS"	Masatoyo Takada	Kazuho Hyōdō	August 18, 2021
Tsukasa is excited when she receives a new smartphone. Once Nasa sets it up for her, she begins using it to exchange contact information with Nasa, Kaname, and Aya. Later in day, Tsukasa becomes lonely while Nasa goes to work. When he finally comes home early in the morning, they embrace each other in his futon. While Tsukasa is working in the bathhouse, she and Nasa are embarrassed when they recall what happened. Elsewhere, Chitose hangs out with her maids. Back at the bathhouse, Tsukasa and Nasa once again embrace each other in his futon.
OVA–2	"Uniform"; Transliteration: "Seifuku" (Japanese: 制服)	Hiroshi Ikehata	Kazuho Hyōdō	November 22, 2022
Waking up her husband with a kiss, Nasa wonders how he could handle it. Later on, Tsukasa wonders how long Nasa could focus on his work while she tries to distract him. She then has him answer questions from a quiz show on TV while he works and he answers perfectly, shocking her. Aya and Charlotte then interrupts them and joins the quiz show; realizing they will lose to Nasa, the girls decide to distract him by having Tsukasa wearing a maid uniform. Nasa still wins, though he is charmed. Tsukasa realizing Nasa likes cosplay decides to cosplay for him. She's eventually pressured into wearing a school uniform and doing shojo manga tropes and eventually leads to making out when she wears it a second time. Nasa then realizes he has awakened a new fetish.

=== Season 2 (2023) ===
No.	Title	Directed by	Written by	Original release date
1	"All because of you"	Shin'ichi Fukumoto	Kazuho Hyōdō	April 8, 2023
With Tsukasa not pleased Nasa was working while she was watching a shark movie at home, Nasa decides to make it up by taking her to see a movie at a premium theater, and she enjoys the movie and time spent with Nasa. After returning home, Kaname asks Nasa about when their wedding will be, which Nasa never thought about. Nasa asks Tsukasa her feelings about weddings and Tsukasa discovers Nasa does not know how much it cost and preparation time is needed to plan a wedding. Meanwhile, as Chitose and Charlotte do martial arts training, they talk about many couples opt to forgo their wedding ceremony and the reception. Aya tells Nasa weddings take about a year to plan and Tsukasa expresses her preference to not spend all the time and money on a wedding. Tsukasa and Nasa buy a wedding magazine at a convenience store and on the way home, Tsukasa convinces Nasa to hold off on the wedding.
2	"On the Subject of Happiness"; Transliteration: "Shiawase Nitsuite" (Japanese: 幸せについて)	Yūsuke Kamata	Hiroshi Ikehata & Norihiko Sudō	April 15, 2023
Nasa meets his former middle school homeroom teacher, Naoko Yanagi, at the convenience store. Noticing Nasa is married, she asks Nasa to meet his wife. He invites Yanagi to dinner at the bathhouse to introduced her to Tsukasa. After dinner, Yanagi asks Nasa about his future plans. Nasa answers his only goal is to make happy memories with Tsukasa, which prompts Yanagi to accept her fellow teacher Taniguchi's offer to go to the theme park together. The next day, Nasa's cousin Ginga Onimaru drops by the bathhouse with a stray cat and does not knowing what to do with it. He asks Nasa to take care of it. Nasa names it Toast and takes Toast to the veterinarian. After nursing Toast back to health, they decide to adopt it. At night, Toast wakes Nasa up and he feeds it before Toast goes back to sleep by Tsukasa's side. In the morning, Tsukasa asks Nasa who is cuter between her and Toast, and they attempt to kiss before Kaname interrupts them. At night, Tsukasa and Nasa kiss in front of Toast.
3	"Before the Fireworks Go Out"; Transliteration: "Hanabi ga Kieru Mae ni" (Japanese: 花火が消える前に)	Norihiko Sudo & Minori Tanaka	Yū Satō	April 22, 2023
Tsukasa and Nasa go on a date to the theme park on a rainy day after Ginga gives them a pair of tickets as their wedding present. Chitose and her maids following them. After going on a few rides, Tsukasa and Nasa run into Yanagi, who came to the theme park with Taniguchi. Believing they are side characters in a romantic comedy, Tsukasa drags Nasa away and she suspects the "free" tickets Yanagi claimed which Taniguchi received were not actually free. Taniguchi attempts to confess his feelings to Yanagi, but before the two overhear another couple's conversation where they talk about how the man said the tickets were free as an excuse to go out together. Taniguchi gets nervous, but Yanagi does not pick up on the truth -- Taniguchi bought the tickets. Afterwards, Tsukasa and Nasa have dinner at the theme park's buffet restaurant, and they play a game to pick food for each other to determine if they know each other's likes. At night, everybody watches the fireworks show with Yanagi admitting her feelings to Taniguchi, but stops short of confessing her love, while Chitose and her maids leave in the middle of the show.
4	"Spots to Kiss"; Transliteration: "Kisu suru Basho" (Japanese: キスする場所)	Yūsuke Onoda	Shigeru Murakoshi	April 29, 2023
Using his technical knowledge, Nasa repairs Kaname's vacuum cleaner. Afterwards, Aya asks Nasa to tutor her and Nasa accepts her request despite never going to high school. After making several worksheets to help Aya study, Nasa puts together a human resources system as requested by one of his old classmates. Concerned about Nasa wearing himself out by overworking, Tsukasa gives Nasa a massage, and Nasa return the favor by massaging her. Kaname then asks Tsukasa how much they are kissing. She suggests Nasa kisses her in different spots as she hands him a list regarding spots to kiss. At night, Tsukasa and Nasa go shopping at the supermarket and when returning, they took the long way home. They spot Yanagi and Tanaguchi kissing each other in the park. After returning home, Tsukasa tells Nasa she got the same list from Kaname and kiss each other according to it. The next day, Kaname tells Nasa she secretly followed the couple at night and tells Nasa to be more careful in public.
5	"The Exciting Expert of the Hot Springs"; Transliteration: "Wakuwaku Onsen Meijin" (Japanese: わくわく温泉名人)	Hitoyuki Matsui	Kazuho Hyōdō	May 6, 2023
Tsukasa and Nasa head out to a hot springs resort in Kusatsu for their honeymoon after Kaname's and Aya's mother wins a pair of tickets in a contest as the sisters are unable to go before the tickets expire. Upon their arrival, the couple is surprised at the size of the resort. After taking a dip in the hot springs, Nasa runs into an old lady and navigates her to the front desk. Meanwhile back at the bathhouse, Aya changes into a swimsuit and Chitose comes over wearing one herself in order to clean the place much to Kaname's amusement. At the front desk, the old lady asks Nasa to escort her to her room, and along the way they run into Tsukasa, who knows the lady is Chitose's grandmother, Tokiko Tsukuyomi, since she was the signatory for the marriage registration. Tokiko issues a challenge to Nasa to visit the big three hot springs in Kusatsu to earn the title Hot Springs Master, which Nasa accepts.
6	"Underneath the Moon"; Transliteration: "Tsukikage no Shita de" (Japanese: 月影の下で)	Norihiko Sudō & Minori Tanaka	Yū Satō	May 13, 2023
7	"An Expanding World"; Transliteration: "Hirogaru Sekai" (Japanese: 広がる世界)	Yūsuke Kamata	Shigeru Murakoshi	May 20, 2023
8	"When You Actually Like It"; Transliteration: "Iya Janai Iya" (Japanese: 嫌じゃない嫌)	Takahiro Tanaka	Yū Satō	May 27, 2023
9	"A Summer Day"; Transliteration: "Natsu no Hi" (Japanese: 夏の日)	Hitoyuki Matsui	Shigeru Murakoshi	June 3, 2023
10	"Thank You"; Transliteration: "Arigatō" (Japanese: ありがとう)	Yūsuke Onoda	Kazuho Hyōdō	June 10, 2023
11	"On a Moonlit Night"; Transliteration: "Tsuki ga Kagayaku Yoru ni" (Japanese: 月が輝く夜に)	Hitoyuki Matsui	Kazuho Hyōdō	June 17, 2023
12	"In All the Times to Come, And Beyond"; Transliteration: "Ikuseisō no Hate no Hate" (Japanese: 幾星霜の果ての果て)	Norihiko Sudō & Minori Tanaka	Kazuho Hyōdō	June 24, 2023
