= List of Fly Me to the Moon chapters =

The chapters of the Japanese manga series Fly Me to the Moon are written and illustrated by Kenjiro Hata. It started its serialization in Shogakukan's Weekly Shōnen Sunday with a two-chapter debut on February 14, 2018. Shogakukan has collected its chapters into individual tankōbon volumes, with the first one published on May 18, 2018. As of September 16, 2026, 37 volumes have been published.

In February 2020, Viz Media announced that they licensed the manga for an English release. The first volume was published on September 8, 2020. As of September 8, 2026, 33 volumes have been released.

== Volumes ==
No.	Original release date	Original ISBN	English release date	English ISBN
1	May 18, 2018	978-4-09-128263-7	September 8, 2020	978-1-9747-1749-1
1. "The Moonlight Is a Message of Love" (月の光は愛のメッセージ, Tsuki no Hikari wa Ai no Messēji); 2. "And Then They Lived Happily Ever After" (…したとさ めでたし めでたし, ...Shitatosa Medetashi Medetashi); 3. "It's Easier than Entering a Contract with Kyubey and Weightier than Becoming a Magical Girl" (それは、キュゥべえと契約するより簡単で、魔法少女になるより重い, Sore wa, Kyūbē to Keiyaku-suru yori Kantan de, Mahō Shōjo ni Naru yori Omoi); 4. "Something It's All Right for Only You to Touch" (君だけが触れていい何か, Kimi dake ga Furete Ii Nanika); 5. "Araragi-kun Once Said He Likes Everything" (かつて阿良々木くんは言いました。全部好きと, Katsute Araragi-kun wa Iimashita. Zenbu Suki to); 6. "I Get Hyper when I Go to Don Qui in the Middle of the Night. In Supermarkets, Too." (夜中にドンキ行くとテンション上がる。深夜営業のスーパーとかも, Yonaka ni Donki Iku to Tenshon Agaru. Shin'ya Eigyō no Sūpā toka mo); 7. "Even when Luna-chan Tells Me to Get Up, I Sleep. I Sleep with Determination." (ルナちゃんに起きてーと言われても寝る。断固として寝る, Runa-chan ni Okitē to Iwaretemo Neru. Danko to shite Neru); 8. "The Most Delicious Thing in the World Is a Meal Someone Treats You To. Man, I Want Sushi." (この世で一番美味しいものは、人の奢りで食べるご飯。あー、お寿司たべたいなぁ, Kono Yo de Ichiban Oishii Mono wa, Hito no Ogori de Taberu Gohan. Aa, Osushi Tabetai naa)
2	August 17, 2018	978-4-09-128384-9	November 10, 2020	978-1-9747-1750-7
9. "I Like Young Folks to Be Spirited to a Fault (If They're Pretty Girls)" (後輩には生意気であってほしい。とにかくウザいくらい生意気であってほしい。※ただし美少女に限る, Kōhai ni wa Namaiki de Atte Hoshii. Tonikaku Uzai kurai Namaiki de Atte Hoshii. *Tadashi Bishōjo ni Kagiru); 10. "The Height of Human Culture: Kanata of the No.3 Bath" (リリンの文化の極み。三番湯くらいのカナタ, Ririn no Bunka no Kiwami. Sanban Yu kurai no Kanata); 11. "This Is Where the Problems Between Men and Women Begin" (男女の間にある様々な問題はこういうところから始まる, Danjo no Aida ni Aru Samazama na Mondai wa kō iu Tokoro kara Hajimaru); 12. "I Want to Go Back There Soon" (早くどこかへ帰りたい, Hayaku Dokoka e Kaeritai); 13. "If That Hits You, You're in Trouble" (それに撃たれると大変, Sore ni Utareru to Taihen); 14. "Promise" (約束, Yakusoku); 15. "I Was Under Orders Not to Stop, so I Kept Going and Drew This" (止まるんじゃねぇぞ、と言った団長の命令がまだ残っていたから、止まらずに描いてみた, Tomarun ja Nē zo, to Itta Danchō no Meirei ga mada Nokotteita kara, Tomarazu ni Kaitemita); 16. "A Chapter So Sweet You Can't Help Picturing Dark Alternate Timelines" (恐らく違う世界線では、とんでもなく不幸になっているのではないだろうかと思うくらい幸せな話, Osoraku Chigau Sekaisen de wa, Tondemonaku Fukō ni Natteiru no de wa Nai darō ka to Omō kurai Shiawase na Hanashi); 17. "I Hope You Read This While Listening to Kenji Ozawa Sing About Living in Love" (オザケンの『愛し愛されて生きるのさ』とかを聞きながら読んでもらえると嬉しい, OzaKen no "Ai-shi Ai-sarete Ikiru no sa" toka o Kikinagara Yonde Moraeru to Ureshii); 18. "After This" (after this(アフター ディス), Afutā Disu)
3	October 18, 2018	978-4-09-128557-7	January 12, 2021	978-1-9747-1751-4
19. "What Kind of Story Is This?!" (なんだこの話？, Nanda Kono Hanashi?); 20. "A Sudden Surprise" (サプライズだから突然に, Sapuraizu da kara Totsuzen ni); 21. "The Two Depart. Our Fight Begins! Thanks for Reading..." (二人の旅立ち。俺たちの戦いはこれからだ！ご愛読ありが…, Futari no Tabidachi. Ore-tachi no Tatakai wa Kore kara da! Go-aidoku Ariga…); 22. "I Don't Know How They Manage Tokyo to Kyoto for 1,600 Yen" (東京ー京都間が1600円ってどうやって成り立っているのか不思議, Tōkyō-Kyōto Kan ga 1600-en tte Dō Yatte Naritatteiru no ka Fushigi); 23. "Food Courts Are About the Fourth Most Exciting Place in Human Civilization" (フードコートという人類の発明で4番目くらいにテンションが上がる場所, Fūdo Kōto to iu Jinrui no Hatsumei de 4-banme kurai ni Tenshon ga Agaru Basho); 24. "I Went to Ebina Just for This Story" (この話のためだけに海老名まで行って来た, Kono Hanashi no Tame dake ni Ebina made Itte Kita); 25. "Kyoto Gets Better the Older You Are" (年齢を重ねれば重ねるほど京都はよくなるよね。, Nenrei o Kasanereba Kasaneru hodo Kyōto wa Yoku Naru yo ne.); 26. "It's All Because I Love You" (全ては君を愛するために, Subete wa Kimi o Ai-suru Tame ni); 27. "I'm Home" (ただいま, Tadaima); 28. "Children Don't Know What Their Parents Are Really Like, Thank Goodness" (親の経験、子知らず。まぁ、知りたくはないけど, Oya no Keiken, Ko Shirazu. Maa, Shiritaku wa Nai kedo)
4	January 18, 2019	978-4-09-128778-6	March 9, 2021	978-1-9747-1752-1
29. "I Want the Dad to Be as Popular as Kurosawa" (父は黒沢と同じくらい人望が欲しい, Chichi wa Kurosawa to Onaji kurai Jinbō ga Hoshii); 30. "It's All Gone Now..." (全ては消えてなくなって…, Subete wa Kiete Naku Natte...); 31. "It's All Because Nini Radio Never Caught On. Eniii!" (原因はきっと任意ラジヲを広めなかったから。えんいー, Gen'in wa Kitto Nin'i Rajio o Hiromenakatta kara. En'ii); 32. "Love Doesn't Simply Stop like the Rain" (恋は雨上がりのように、ってわけにはいかない, Koi wa Ameagari no Yō ni, tte Wake ni wa Ikanai); 33. "Not a Dream! Not an Imaginary Story! The Romantic Tension is Over!" (ラブストーリーは突然に終了。ところがどっこい…夢じゃありません…！現実です…！これが現実…！, Rabu Sutōrī wa Totsuzen ni Shūryō. Tokoroga Dokkoi… Yume ja Arimasen…! Genjitsu desu…! Kore ga Genjitsu…!); 34. "I Didn't Learn Programming with BASIC. Instead, I Read Kage-san's Manga" (ベーマガではプログラムを組まず影さんの漫画ばっか読んでた, Bēmaga de wa Puroguramu o Kumazu Kage-san no Manga bakka Yondeta); 35. "Take a Trip to Cleanse Your Soul, Then Come Home and Wash Your Clothes" (命の洗濯で旅行に行って家に帰って服を洗濯, Inochi no Sentaku de Ryokō ni Itte Ie ni Kaette Fuku o Sentaku); 36. "Only Cats Are Effortlessly Cute" (努力しなくても可愛いは猫だけ, Doryoku Shinakutemo Kawaii wa Neko dake); 37. "Who Made This Deep-Fried Pork Cutlet?! Yuzan Said Calmly and Politely" (「このトンカツを作ったやつは誰だー！」と言って雄山が怒鳴り込んで来ない, "Kono Tonkatsu o Tsukutta Yatsu wa Dare dā!" to Itte Yūzan ga Donarikonde Konai); 38. "The Road Home" (家路, Ieji); 31.5 "One Night, with Extra Pages" (本編の1話分よりもページ数が多い…ある夜の話, Honpen no 1-wa bun yori mo pējisū ga ōi… Aru yoru no hanashi)
5	March 18, 2019	978-4-09-129087-8	May 11, 2021	978-1-9747-1923-5
39. "The Early Bird Gets the Worm, but Who Wants Worms?" (3文は約90円。90円くらいで早起きしていられるか。, 3-mon wa Yaku 90-en. 90-en kurai de Hayaoki Shiteirareru ka.); 40. "Happy Married Couples Day! I Want to Win Best Partner of the Year. Ah, Autumn..." (いい夫婦の日。ベスト・パートナー・オブ・ザ・イヤーに選ばれたい。秋…, Ii Fūfu no Hi. Besuto Pātonā Obu Za Iyā ni Erabaretai. Aki…); 41. "Time! For! A! Paaarty!!!" (う！た！げ！の！と！き！だ――!!!!, U! Ta! Ge! No! To! Ki! Dā!!!!); 42. "This Fool's Hand Is Shining! It Commands Me to Defeat You!" (バカのこの手が光ってうなる。お前を倒せと輝き叫ぶ！, Baka no Kono Te ga Hikatte Unaru. Omae o Taose to Kagayaki Sakebu!); 43. "Number of Times I Went to an Aquarium to Draw a Dating Scene: 2. Number of Times I Went on a Date: 0." (水族館デートを描くために水族館に行った回数2回。誰かと一緒に行ったことはない, Suizokukan Dēto o Kaku Tame ni Suizokukan ni Itta Kaisū 2-kai. Dareka to Issho ni Itta Koto wa Nai); 44. "I Flood My Manga with Straight Men and Drizzle It with Comedians" (嵐のようにツッコンでそのボケをあきらめないーさー, Arashi no yō ni Tsukkon de Sono Boke o Akiramenaīsā); 45. "Whether You Believe Is Up to You" (信じるか信じないかあなたしだい, Shinjiru ka Shinjinai ka Anata-shidai); 46. "Hey, Here's an Eight-Page Short" (今週は8P(ページ)のショートショート, Konshū wa 8 Pēji no Shōto Shōto); 47. "I Feel like I've Been Drawing Maid Outfits Forever" (ずっとメイド服描いてる気がする, Zutto Meido Fuku Kaiteru Ki ga Suru); 48. "On Happiness" (幸せについて, Shiawase ni Tsuite); 40.5 "Supposedly This Is What Couples Do in the Park at Night" (夫婦二人で夜中人気のない公園を歩いていると大体こうなる説, Fūfu Futari de Yonaka Hitoke no Nai Kōen o Aruiteiru to Daitai kō Naru Setsu)
6	June 18, 2019	978-4-09-129164-6	July 13, 2021	978-1-9747-1924-2
49. "I Believe Cuteness Is Justice" (可愛いは正義、だと思う, Kawaii wa Seigi, da to Omō); 50. "Mrs. Yuzaki and Nasa, Written with the Kanji for 'Starry Sky'" (由崎の花嫁。星空と書いてナサと読むきん！, Yuzaki no Hanayome. Hoshizora to Kaite Nasa to Yomukin!); 51. "Healthy Is Best" (元気が一番, Genki ga Ichiban); 52. "Defenseless Things Begging for Affection Are Cute" (甘えてくる無防備なものは大体可愛い, Amaete Kuru Mubōbi na Mono wa Daitai Kawaii); 53. "Cat vs. Married Couple" (猫 vs 夫婦, Neko vs Fūfu); 54. "Sailor Uniforms Are Cute" (セーラー服は可愛い, Sērāfuku wa Kawaii); 55. "For This, I Went to the Land of Dreams in Maihama for the First Time in Ten Years. Alone. In the Rain." (このためだけに10年ぶりくらいに舞浜の夢の国に行った。一人で。雨の中で。, Kono Tame dake ni 10-nen-buri kurai ni Maihama no Yume no Kuni ni Itta. Hitori de. Ame no Naka de.); 56. "Everywhere You Go, There Are Fights You Can't Lose" (負けられない戦いがいろんなとこにある, Makerarenai Tatakai ga Ironna Toko ni Aru); 57. "Before the Fireworks Go Out" (花火が消える前に, Hanabi ga Kieru Mae ni); 58. "Getting Cutesy: The Next Generation" (新時代に伝えたいイチャコラ, Shin Jidai ni Tsutaetai Ichakora); 54.5 "Married Couple: How to Use a Uniform at Night" (夫婦 夜の制服の使い方, Fūfu Yoru no Seifuku no Tsukaikata)
7	August 16, 2019	978-4-09-129315-2	September 14, 2021	978-1-9747-1925-9
59. "No Matter How Convenient Smartphones Are, Loneliness Is Lonely" (どれだけスマホが便利になっても寂しいのは寂しい, Dore dake Sumaho ga Benri ni Nattemo Sabishii no wa Sabishii); 60. "What's This?!" (なんじゃこりゃ, Nan ja Korya); 61. "A Poetic Line in the Dead of Night Can Kill You" (深夜に送ったポエムなラインが死因の1つ, Shin'ya ni Okutta Poemu na Rain ga Shiin no 1-tsu); 62. "Devilish Airheads Are Bad News" (悪性の天然はたちが悪い, Majō no Tennen wa Tachi ga Warui); 63. "We May Have to Censor a Lot of Words Here. Do You Mind?" (今回はふせ字が多そうなんですがどうでしょうか？, Konkai wa Fuseji ga ōsō nan desu ga dō deshō ka?); 64. "How Reliable!" (頼りになるなぁ, Tayori ni Naru naa); 65. "I Want to Give a Massage and Get One Too" (もまれたいし もみたい, Momaretai-shi Momitai); 66. "He's a Smart Guy" (頭はいい子なのである, Atama wa Ii Ko nanode Aru); 67. "June Is Superhot" (6月超暑い, 6-gatsu Chō Atsui); 68. "Yup, I See It Too" (だから私にも見える, Dakara Watashi ni mo Mieru); 69. "Steamy, Hot and Bothered" (ワクワク沸く沸く, Wakuwaku Waku Waku); 64.5 "Peaceful Daily Life" (平和な日常, Heiwa na Nichijō)
8	October 18, 2019	978-4-09-129433-3	November 9, 2021	978-1-9747-2354-6
70. "Labyrinth of Time" (時のラビリンス, Toki no Rabirinsu); 71. "Beyond the Edge of Time" (幾星霜の果ての果て, Ikuseisō no Hate no Hate); 72. "I Earned the Title of Hot Spring Expert" (草津温泉名人の称号を僕はもらいました, Kusatsu Onsen Meijin no Shōgō o Boku wa Moraimashita); 73. "Under the Moonlight" (月影の下で, Tsukikage no Shita de); 74. "Whoever Says 'I Love You' or 'I Hate You' First, You Should Say 'I Love You'" (好きとか嫌いとか最初に言い出したのは誰なのか知らないけど好きとか言った方がいい, Suki toka Kirai toka Saisho ni Iidashita no wa Dare na no ka Shiranai kedo Suki toka Itta hō ga ii); 75. "Thinking of You" (君を想う, Kimi o Omō); 76. "I Want to Love More" (もっとTO LOVE(ト ラブ)りたかった, Motto To Rabu-ritakatta); 77. "80 Degrees Is Too Hot and 79 Degrees Is Too Cold" (27℃設定だと暑く、26℃だと寒い, 27°C Settei da to Atsuku, 26°C da to Samui); 78. "One Hot Day After Another" (暑い日が続きますね, Atsui Hi ga Tsuzukimasu ne); 79. "The Friend of a Friend Is a Stranger" (友達の友達は他人, Tomodachi no Tomodachi wa Tanin); 78.5 "Please, Not the Withering Scorn" (怒られたくはないので…, Okoraretaku wa Nai no de…)
9	January 17, 2020	978-4-09-129544-6	January 11, 2022	978-1-9747-2355-3
80. "Twilight Bonfire" (宵かがり, Yoi Kagari); 81. "Tsubasa Honda's YouTube Channel Taught Me the Power of Cuteness" (可愛いってすごいと、本田翼ちゃんのYouTube(ユーチューブ)チャンネルを見て思う, Kawaii-tte Sugoi to, Honda Tsubasa-chan no Yūchūbu Channeru o Mite Omō); 82. "Boys, This Knowledge Is Truly Useful in Life" (少年たちへ、本当に役に立つ知識とはこんなやつだと思う, Shōnen-tachi e, Hontō ni Yaku ni Tatsu Chishiki to wa Konna Yatsu da to Omō); 83. "It's Not Something You Can Master Overnight" (一朝一夕でできるようになると思うなかれ, Itchō isseki de dekiru yō ni naru to omō nakare); 84. "Husband and Pesky Wife" (お嫁さんがウザいだんな様の話, Oyome-san ga Uzai Danna-sama no Hanashi); 85. "Learn How to Respond to an Invitation. Any Mistake Can Be Fatal." (嫌じゃない嫌を見極める修業。間違えると死ぬ。, Iya ja Nai Iya o Mikiwameru Shugyō. Machigaeru to Shinu.); 86. "The Way of the Sauna and the Sitcom" (サ道とラブコメは哲学, Sadō to Rabukome wa Tetsugaku); 87. "It'll Bother You if You Let It" (なんか困っていると困ってしまう。, Nanka Komatteiru to Komatteshimau.); 88. "Even Smart People Catch Colds" (バカじゃないけど風邪はひく, Baka ja Nai kedo Kaze wa Hiku); 89. "Phalaenopsis" (ファレノプシス, Farenopushisu); 84.5 "All's Well That Ends in More Mushiness" (全部ひっくるめていつもどおりの夫婦のイチャイチャです, Zenbu Hikkurumete Itsumo-dōri no Fūfu no Ichaicha desu)
10	March 18, 2020	978-4-09-129565-1	March 8, 2022	978-1-9747-2356-0
90. "After 40, Some Part of Your Body Always Hurts" (40代になると常に体のどっかが痛い, 40-dai ni Naru to Tsune ni Karada no Dokka ga Itai); 91. "Always Finish a Fried Egg by Swallowing the Yolk Whole" (目玉焼きの黄身はさいごに丸飲み, Medamayaki no Kimi wa Saigo ni Marunomi); 92. "The Day She Got Everything" (全てを貰った日, Subete o Moratta Hi); 93. "I Always Want to Do It All" (常に色々したい, Tsune ni Iroiro Shitai); 94. "Youthful Experiences Pile Up and Warp You" (若い時の経験のつみ重ねで人は歪んでいく, Wakai Toki no Keiken no Tsumikasane de Hito wa Yugande Iku); 95. "Beware the Airhead" (天然こわい, Tennen Kowai); 96. "Beyond the Night Sky" (夜空のむこう, Yozora no Mukō); 97. "I Recommend the Mountains" (ヤマヲススメ, Yama o Susume); 98. "Marriage Forest: I Wanted to Give It a Mysterious Mermaid Forest Atmosphere, but It Didn't Work Out" (夫婦の森。人魚の森っぽく怪しい雰囲気にしたかったけど、そうはならなかった森, Fūfu no Mori. Ningyo no Mori-ppoku Ayashii Fun'iki ni Shitakatta kedo, Sō wa Naranakatta Mori); 99. "Thank You" (ありがとう, Arigatō); 90.5 "Marital Nocturnal Workout" (夫婦 夜の運動, Fūfu Yoru no Undō)
11	May 18, 2020	978-4-09-850070-3	May 10, 2022	978-1-9747-2357-7
100. "Congratulations" (祝福, Shukufuku); 101. "On a Moonlit Night" (月が輝く夜に, Tsuki ga Kagayaku Yoru ni); 102. "Because" (because(ビコーズ), Bikōzu); 103. "That's True, but My Wife Is Cute" (それはそうと嫁が可愛い, Sore wa Sō to Yome ga Kawaii); 104. "The End of the Road and Beyond" (道の終わりと、その続き, Michi no Owari to, Sono Tsuzuki); 105. "I Can Gaze at Real Estate Sites All Day Long" (スーモとかで間取りを一日中眺めていられる, Sūmo toka de Madori o Ichinichijū Nagameteirareru); 106. "This Could Go On Indefinitely" (この話、無限にできる, Kono Hanashi, Mugen ni Dekiru); 107. "What You Absolutely Must Remember when You Become an Adult" (君が大人になった時、絶対に覚えておいた方がいいこと, Kimi ga Otona ni Natta Toki, Zettai ni Oboeteoita Hō ga ii Koto); 108. "Code, Part 1" (code(コード)(前編), Kōdo (Zenpen)); 109. "Code, Part 2" (code(コード)(後編), Kōdo (Kōhen)); 103.5 "It's Not Something You Can Show Anyone Else" (人に見せられるものじゃない, Hito ni Miserareru Mono ja Nai)
12	August 18, 2020	978-4-09-850171-7	August 9, 2022	978-1-9747-2358-4
110. "You're Shocking" (ユーはショック, Yū wa Shokku); 111. "I Want Ramen" (ラーメン食べたい, Rāmen Tabetai); 112. "A Digression" (こぼれ話, Koborebanashi); 113. "The Moon and Stars Formula" (月と星の数式, Tsuki to Hoshi no Sūshiki); 114. "Situation: Critical" (シチュエーションって大事, Shichuēshon-tte Daiji); 115. "Complicated Hair, Complicated Love Life" (髪型がむつかしい子は恋愛もむつかしい, Kamigata ga Mutsukashii Ko wa Ren'ai mo Mutsukashii); 116. "Teenage Girls Can Get Away with Anything" (女子高生ならたいてい許される, Joshi Kōsei nara Taitei Yurusareru); 117. "Love Is Better in Dark, Secluded Places" (恋は暗くて狭いところでするとよりいい, Koi wa Kurakute Semai Tokoro de Suru to yori Ii); 118. "Journey's End" (旅路の果て, Tabiji no Hate); 117.5 "Idle Diary" (徒然日記, Tsurezure Nikki)
13	October 16, 2020	978-4-09-850269-1	September 13, 2022	978-1-9747-2800-8
119. "Beyond 1,000 Nights" (千の夜を超えて, Sen no Yoru o Koete); 120. "Flower of Life" (命の花, Inochi no Hana); 121. "Entangled with Idiots" (バカからのとばっちり, Baka kara no Tobatchiri); 122. "Sometimes He Looks Cool" (たまにカッコよく見える, Tama ni Kakkoyoku Mieru); 123. "Plenty of Nudity" (裸がいっぱい, Hadaka ga Ippai); 124. "At Paranormal Hot Spots, You Have a Higher Chance of Running into Delinquents than Ghosts" (心霊スポットでは幽霊より野生のヤンキーに遭遇する率の方が高い, Shinrei Supotto de wa Yūrei yori Yasei no Yankī ni Sōgū-suru Ritsu no Hō ga Takai); 125. "I Clicked on a Scary Image and Crashed My Browser" (怖いもの見たさでみたらブラクラ画像だった, Kowai Mono Mitasa de Mitara Burakura Gazō datta); 126. "Masakado and Kiyomori Are Different People" (将門と清盛は違う人, Masakado to Kiyomori wa Chigau Hito); 127. "The Manga's Good, but Watch the Anime Too, Okay?" (漫画もいいけどアニメも観てね！, Manga mo Ii kedo Anime mo Mite ne!); 123.5 "Growing Girls Need Sleep" (寝る子は育つ, Neru Ko wa Sodatsu)
14	December 18, 2020	978-4-09-850284-4	November 8, 2022	978-1-9747-2801-5
128. "Battle of the Sore Losers" (負けずぎらいの戦い, Makezugirai no Tatakai); 129. "Corpses in Horror Games Tend to Leave Mysterious Messages" (ホラーゲームの死体謎のメッセージを残しがち, Horā Gēmu no Shitai Nazo no Messēji o Nokoshigachi); 130. "Conformation"; 131. "I Believe"; 132. "The Anime Is on the Air" (TV(テレビ)アニメ放送中だよ, Terebi Anime Hōsō-chū da yo); 133. "Mine Alone" (僕だけの…, Boku Dake no...); 134. "November 22 Is Happy Couples Day" (11月22日はいい夫婦の日だよ, 11-gatsu 22-nichi wa Ii Fūfu no Hi da yo); 135. "Sometimes It's Worth Meddling in Other People's Problems" (問題はなくても解決すべきことはある, Mondai wa Nakutemo Kaiketsu subeki Koto wa Aru); 136. "Halfsies with You" (君と半分ずつ, Kimi to Hanbunzutsu); 136.5 "We're Married, so It Can't End There" (夫婦なのでそこでは終われない, Fūfu nanode Soko de wa Owarenai)
15	April 16, 2021	978-4-09-850396-4	January 10, 2023	978-1-9747-2802-2
104Ⓑ "subscript"; XXX. "Eternity Is Here" (永遠はここに, Eien wa Koko ni); 141. "1,000 Years of Solitude" (千年の孤独, Sennen no Kodoku); 142. "On Misunderstandings" (誤解と誤解について, Gokai to Gokai ni Tsuite); 143. "On Promises" (約束と約束について, Yakusoku to Yakusoku ni Tsuite); 144. "On the Past" (過去と過去について, Kako to Kako ni Tsuite); 145. "On Loss" (喪失と喪失について, Sōshitsu to Sōshitsu ni Tsuite); 146. "On Love and Life" (愛と命について, Ai to Inochi ni Tsuite); Part 1, Final Chapter: "Love Song" (第1部最終話 恋のうた, Dai 1-bu Saishūwa: Koi no Uta)
16	June 17, 2021	978-4-09-850591-3	March 14, 2023	978-1-9747-2903-6
1. "Twilight" (黄昏, Tasogare); 2. "Life Burns Out" (燃え尽きる命, Moetsukiru Inochi); 3. "The Nameless Monster" (名前のない怪物, Namae no Nai Kaibutsu); 4. "Freesia" (フリージア, Furījia); 148. "Moon and Stars" (月と星空, Tsuki to Hoshizora); Bonus Manga: "Mistress and Servant Intrude" (しゃしゃってる主従, Shashatteru Shujū); 137. "Gwooosh! I'm a Human Thermal Power Plant" (うおォン 俺はまるで人間火力発電所だ, Uoon Ore wa Marude Ningen Karyoku Hatsudensho da); 138. "Eating Meat" (肉を喰らう, Niku o Kurau); 139. "Sing, Ryugu Castle!" (歌え竜宮城, Utae Ryūgū-jō); 140. "This Song Forces Shutdown" (この曲がかかると強制終了, Kono Kyoku ga Kakaru to Kyōsei Shūryō); Bonus Manga: "Part 1 Epilogue" (FLY ME TO THE MOON 第1章エピローグ, FLY ME TO THE MOON Dai 1-shō Epirōgu)
17	August 18, 2021	978-4-09-850641-5	May 9, 2023	978-1-9747-3230-2
149. "I'll Camp Here so You Aren't Lonely" (君がさみしくないようにここをキャンプ地とする, Kimi ga Samishikunai yō ni Koko o Kyanpu-chi to Suru); 150. "Someday, I Want You to Know How Hard It Was to Stay Silent" (いつか大人になる君へ。それを言わない胆力がどれほどのものか知って欲しい, Itsuka otona ni naru kimi e. Sore o iwanai tanryoku ga dore hodo no mono ka shitte hoshii); 151. "I Should Point Out that They're Married and Over the Age of Consent" (一応、言っておくと18歳と16歳（仮）の夫婦なのである, Ichiō, itte oku to 18-sai to 16-sai (kari) no fūfu nanode aru); 151.5 "The Story Continues" (で、その続き, De, Sono Tsuzuki); 152. "Gift" (GIFT(ギフト), Gifuto); 153. "To the Blue Sky" (青空へ, Aozora e); 154. "1,400 Years, One Step" (千四百年の一歩, Sen'yonhyaku-nen no Ippo); 155. "The End of the Dream" (夢の終わり, Yume no Owari); 156. "Time" (光陰, Kōin); 157. "Death Hates Me" (死に嫌われている, Shi ni Kirawareteiru); 158. "Blue Sky" (青空, Aozora)
18	November 18, 2021	978-4-09-850734-4	July 11, 2023	978-1-9747-3461-0
159. "It Doesn't Take Much to Make Curry Taste Good" (カレーなんてもんは適当に作っても大体美味い, Karē Nante Mon wa Tekitō ni Tsukuttemo Daitai Umai); 160. "This Means War" (それをやったら戦争だ, Sore o Yattara Sensō da); 161. "Go, Speed Racer, Go!" (マッハでゴーゴーゴー, Mahha de GōGōGō); 162. "I Wanna Dive Somewhere in a Corolla II. Maybe a Hot Spring. Anything Will Do." (カローラIIに乗ってどこかに行きたい。温泉とか行きたい。もうこのさいどこでもいい, Karōra Tsū ni notte dokoka ni ikitai. Onsen toka ikitai. Mō kono sai dokodemo ii); 163. "A Pointless Marriage Story" (夫婦のどうでもいい話, Fūfu no Dōdemoii Hanashi); 164. "A Really Pointless Marriage Story with Cuddling" (本当にどうでもいい夫婦のイチャイチャ話, Hontō ni Dōdemoii Fūfu no Ichaicha-banashi); 165. "An Incredibly Pointless Story I Was Gonna Save for a Bonus Chapter" (番外編にしようかと思ったすごいどうでもいい話, Bangai-hen ni Shiyō ka to Omotta Sugoi Dōdemoii Hanashi); 166. "The Souvenir Habit" (みやげものとかで買いがち, Miyagemono toka de Kai-gachi); 167. "Driving Is Hard" (車の運転って大変, Kuruma no Unten-tte Taihen); 169. "An Old Story About a Young Woman" (ある少女の昔話, Aru Shōjo no Mukashibanashi); 167.5 "A Pointless Scene After the Car Rental" (どうでもいいレンタカーの後日談, Dōdemoii Renta Kā no Gojitsudan)
19	February 18, 2022	978-4-09-850871-6	September 12, 2023	978-1-9747-3745-1
170. "Season 2 Is on the Slate" (2期決まったよ, 2-ki Kimatta yo); 171. "A Fender Bender Dents Your Car... and Your Heart" (車はこすると凹む。心も凹む, Kuruma wa Kosuru to Hekomu. Kokoro mo Hekomu); 172. "Cats Are Cute Too" (猫もかわいい, Neko mo Kawaii); 173. "I Love Watching Videos About Road Trips, RV Life, and Mountain Climbing, but I Never Actually Do Those Things" (車中泊とかキャンピングカーとか雪山登山とか憧れて動画見るけどやらない, Shachū-haku toka Kyanpingu Kā toka Yukiyama Tozan toka Akogarete Dōga Miru kedo Yaranai); 174. "A 1,400-Year Miscalculation" (1400年の誤算, 1400-nen no Gosan); 175. "Times Change Even when Places Don't" (同じ場所でも時代は変わる, Onaji Basho demo Jidai wa Kawaru); 176. "Strategy for Sore Losers" (負けず嫌いの攻略法, Makezugirai no Kōryakuhō); 177. "Watching Videos About Getting Stranded in the Mountains Creates the Impression That It's Sure to Happen" (山で遭難する動画ばっか見てると、山ってほぼ遭難するんだって思う, Yama de Sōnan-suru Dōga bakka Miteru to, Yama-tte hodo Sōnan-surun datte Omō); 178. "Heaven and Earth" (天と地と, Ten to Chi to); 168. "Hayate the Combat Butler 2" (ハヤテのごとく！2(ツー), Hayate no Gotoku! Tsū); Bonus Chapter: "Go for It, Kaguya!" (それいけ輝夜さん, Sore Ike Kaguya-san)
20	June 17, 2022	978-4-09-851156-3	November 14, 2023	978-1-9747-4078-9
179. "Not All Mysteries Need to Be Solved" (謎よりも前に人として大事なことはある, Nazo yori mo Mae ni Hito to shite Daiji na Koto wa Aru); 180. "Memories of Life" (命の記憶, Inochi no Kioku); 181. "Memories of Living" (いのちの記憶, Inochi no Kioku); 182. Bonus Manga①: "Shirogane and Her Friend" (番外編① 白銀と友人と, Bangaihen 1 Shirogane to Yūjin to); 183. Bonus Manga②: "Myako and Her Friend" (番外編② ミャー子と友人と, Bangaihen 2 Myāko to Yūjin to); 184. "It's Hard to Watch Married Couples Act All Mushy" (夫婦のイチャイチャだいたい見ていられない, Fūfu no Ichaicha Daitai Miteirarenai); 185. "Mushy Stuff in the Bathroom and Bedroom" (風呂と寝室とイチャイチャ, Furo to Shinshitsu to Ichaicha); 186. "Fragments of the Past" (過去の欠片, Kako no Kakera); 187. "Overlapping Shadows" (重なる影, Kasanaru Kage); 185.5 "The Naked Relationship" (裸のおつきあい, Hadaka no Otsukiai)
21	September 15, 2022	978-4-09-851263-8	January 9, 2024	978-1-9747-4285-1
188. "Even Having Become Pure-White Ash" (真っ白な灰になっても, Masshiro na Hai ni Nattemo); 189. "That Light by Your Side" (その光は君のそばに, Sono Hikari wa Kimi no Soba ni); 190. "After 1,400 Years..." (1400年生きたって…, 1400-nen Ikitatte...); 191. "Of Course, No Trouble Is Better" (トラブルはない方が当然いい, Toraburu wa Nai Hō ga Tōzen Ii); 192. "My Wife Is So Cute I Can't Take It" (嫁が可愛すぎて困る, Yome ga Kawaisugite Komaru); 193. "The Law of Sexiness Conservation" (セクシー保存の法則, Sekkushī Hozon no Hōsoku); 194. "Kaguya's Ambition" (輝夜さんの野望, Kaguya-san no Yabō); 195. "A Tale of Learning Much and Understanding Nothing" (かしこくなると全部わからなくなる話, Kashikoku naru to Zenbu Wakaranaku Naru Hanashi); 196. "In Chart Form: Basic Love Inflation Theory–Complete Notebook Pack" (チャート式 基礎からのラブインフレーション理論完成ノートパック, Chāto Shiki Kiso kara no Rabu Infurēshon Riron Kansei Nōtopakku); 197. "20th Anniversary Yoo-Hoo" (20周年ヤッホー！, 20-shūnen Yahhō!); 198. "Pining for Love Now and Then" (今も昔も、恋い焦がれ, Ima mo Mukashi mo, Koikogare); 193.5 "Sexy Moves" (セクシーを動かす, Sekkushī o Ugokasu)
22	December 16, 2022	978-4-09-851478-6	March 12, 2024	978-1-9747-4318-6
199. "Prologue" (プロローグ, Purorōgu); 200. "Because You're Here" (あなたがいることで, Anata ga Iru Koto de); 201. "Is There Still Something Love Can Do?" (愛にできることはまだあるかい, Ai ni Dekiru Koto wa Mada Aru kai); 202. "Miracle" (奇蹟, Kiseki); 203. "Moonlight" (月の明かり, Tsuki no Akari); 204. "Moon Drop" (月のしずく, Tsuki no Shizuku); 205. "If You Call That Love" (それを愛と呼ぶなら, Sore o Ai to Yobu Nara); 206. "Find the Way" (FIND THE WAY(ファインド ザ ウェイ), Faindo Za Wei); 207. "Prayer" (祈り, Inori); 209. "Melodies of Life" (Melodies Of Life(メロディーズ オブ ライフ), Merodīzu Obu Raifu)
23	March 16, 2023	978-4-09-851770-1	May 14, 2024	978-1-9747-4557-9
208. "A Future That Might Have Been" (あったかもしれない未来の話, Atta kamoshirenai Mirai no Hanashi); 210. "I Want to Hide but Also Be Noticed" (隠したいけど気付かれたい, Kakushitai kedo Kizukaretai); 211. "I Wouldn't Kitbash a Gundam Model in Tribute to Plamo-Kyoshiro and Ruin the Whole Thing" (プラモ狂四郎に憧れてガンプラ改造したけど全部壊した奴とは違うのです, Puramo Kyōshirō ni Akogarete Ganpura Kaizō-shita kedo Zenbu Kowashita Yatsu to wa Chigau no desu); 212. "Oops, I Drew Some More! The Unbelievable Continuation from Last Time!" (あれ？ぼくまたなんかやっちゃいました？というまさかの前回からの続き, Are? Boku mata nanka yatchaimashita? To iu masaka no zenkai kara no tsuzuki); 213. "Fragments of Faint Memory" (かすかな思い出のかけら, Kasuka na Omoide no Kakera); 214. "Sweet and Bitter, Then and Now" (今も昔も酸い甘い, Ima mo Mukashi mo Sui Amai); 216. "One Step with the Wind" (風の一歩, Kaze no Ippo); 217. "Nothing Left to Say" (もう語ることはなく, Mō Kataru Koto wa Naku); 218. "Fate Ties Me to You" (君、繋ぐ縁, Kimi, Tsunagu En); 215. "Announcement, Part 2" (告知！2, Kokuchi! 2); Bonus Manga "Chapter 210 Minus 0.5" (210マイナス0.5話, 210 Mainasu 0.5-wa)
24	June 16, 2023	978-4-09-852122-7	July 9, 2024	978-1-9747-4604-0
219. "Hearts Connected by Kindness" (繋がる心と優しさと, Tsunagaru Kokoro to Yasashisa to); 220. "Dating Is Different from Marriage" (恋愛と結婚は別物, Ren'ai to Kekkon wa Betsumono); 221. "Drawing Out Secrets Isn't Like Drawing Manga" (カクシゴトは描く仕事ではなかった, Kakushigoto wa Kaku Shigoto de wa Nakatta); 222. "With Feeling" (想いをこめて, Omoi o Komete); 223. "A Future of Tears" (涙の未来, Namida no Mirai); 224. "I Wanna Do This and That" (あれもしたい、これもしたい, Are mo Shitai, Kore mo Shitai); 225. "Time Flies like an Arrow" (光陰矢の如し, Kōin Ya no Gotoshi); 226. "New Series: I'm an Otaku and My Gal Pal Won't Leave Me Alone" (新連載 クラスメートのギャルはオタクな僕に絡みがち, Shin Rensai Kurasumēto no Gyaru wa Otaku na Boku ni Karami-gachi); 227. "Chapter 2" (第二話, Dai Ni-wa); 228. "Good Job on Your Entrance Exams" (入試お疲れ様でした, Nyūshi Otsukaresama deshita); 229. "How to Choose Your Future Path" (将来の道の決め方, Shōrai no Michi no Kimekata); Bonus Manga "Chapter 210 Minus ½: Heartbeat Pool" (210マイナス0.5話 ドキドキプール編, 210 Mainasu 0.5-wa Dokidoki Pūru-hen)
25	September 15, 2023	978-4-09-852841-7	September 10, 2024	978-1-9747-4876-1
230. "Let Sleeping Dogs Lie" (忘れたことはそっとしておいたほうがいい, Wasureta Koto wa Sotto Shite Oita Hō ga ii); 231. "Memories of a Distant Starry Sky" (遠い星空の記憶, Tōi Hoshizora no Kioku); 232. "The Strength to Go the Distance" (最果に至る力, Saihate ni Itaru Chikara); 233. "The Promise I Made to You That Day" (あの日誓った君との約束, Ano Hi Chikatta Kimi to no Yakusoku); 234. "Wish" (願い, Negai); 235. "I Want to Seriously Tell You Kids Not to Take Marriage for Granted" (子供たちに伝えたい、夫婦関係で絶対に怠ってはいけないこと。マジで。, Kodomo-tachi ni tsutaetai, fūfu kankei de zettai ni okotatte wa ikenai koto. Maji de.); 236. "Ninety Percent of a Date Is Advance Research" (デートは下調べが9割, Dēto wa Shitashirabe ga 9-wari); 237. "I Can't Believe Folks Don't Go to Tokyo Tower More Often" (東京タワーって意外といかないよね, Tōkyō Tawā-tte Igai to Ikanai yo ne); 238. "The Top Deck of Tokyo Tower Is Narrower than I Thought" (東京タワーのトップデッキは思ったよりせまいよね, Tōkyō Tawā no Toppu Dekki wa Omotta yori Semai yo ne); 239. "Your Name Is" (君の名は, Kimi no Na wa); 234.5. "Before the Date" (デートの前, Dēto no Mae)
26	December 18, 2023	978-4-09-853048-9	November 12, 2024	978-1-9747-4977-5
240. "Studying Should Pay Off" (勉強は学んで生かそう, Benkyō wa Manande Ikasō); 241. "Trouble Always Strikes at the Worst Time" (時間がない時ほど厄介なことに巻き込まれがち, Jikan ga nai toki hodo yakkai na koto ni makikomare-gachi); 242. "Because I Chose to Live Alongside You" (君と生きると決めたから, Kimi to Ikiru to Kimetakara); 243. "Even at the Cost of My Life" (たとえこの身を捨ててでも, Tatoe Kono Mi o Sutete demo); 244. "The Marriage Bond Is as Hot as Summer" (夫婦の絆は熱い 夏は暑い, Fūfu no Kizuna wa Atsui Natsu wa Atsui); 245. "Marriage Is a Challenge and So Is the Announcement" (結婚は報告も大変, Kekkon wa Hōkoku mo Taihen); 246. "Normal Romantic Comedy Developments" (普通のラブコメ展開, Futsū no Rabu Kome Tenkai); 247. "It's Magic!" (魔力あるよね, Maryoku Aru yo ne); 248. "A Rom-Com That Breaks the Template" (ラブコメテンプレ回避ラブコメ, Rabu Kome Tenpure Kaihi Rabu Kome); 249. "The Angel and Immortality" (天女と不死, Tennyo to Fushi); 250. "Immortality and the Child" (不死と子供, Fushi to Kodomo); 248.5. "The Great Luv-Luv Gambit" (スキスキ大作戦, Sukisuki Daisakusen)
27	March 18, 2024	978-4-09-853176-9	February 11, 2025	978-1-9747-5251-5
251. "Immortality and a Decision" (不死と決断, Fushi to Ketsudan); 252. "Immortality and Immortality" (不死と不死, Fushi to Fushi); 253. "Immortality and Indestructibility" (不死と不滅, Fushi to Fumetsu); 254. "Immortality and the Future" (不死と未来, Fushi to Mirai); 255. "Aw... I Wish I Was Clever" (あー、ホント賢くなりたい, Aa, Honto Kashikoku Naritai); 256. "Sorry About the Missed Weeks" (休載してごめんね, Kyūsai-shite Gomen ne); 257. "Enjoying College Life to the Fullest While Raising a Daughter I Don't Remember Giving Birth To" (一人暮らしの大学生活を満喫しようとしたら、産んだ覚えのない娘が出来た件, Hitorigurashi no Daigaku Seikatsu o Mankitsu-shiyō to Shitara, Unda Oboe no Nai Musume ga Dekita Ken); 258. "Even Old Questions Are Hard to Answer" (過去問って解くだけでも大変, Kakomon-tte Toku dake demo Taihen); 259. "Memory" (記憶, Kioku); Bonus Manga: "Fly Me to the Demon Castle" (魔王城でカワイイ, Maō-jō de Kawaii); 259.5. "Faces You Can Only Show Your Spouse" (夫婦じゃないと見せない顔がある, Fūfu ja Nai to Misenai Kao ga Aru)
28	June 18, 2024	978-4-09-853376-3	May 13, 2025	978-1-9747-5498-4
260. "Fossilized Footprints" (足跡の化石, Ashiato no Kaseki); 261. "Toward Happy Days" (幸せな日々へ, Shiawase na Hibi e); 262. "The Blade Remembers" (刃の記憶, Yaiba no Kioku); 263. "1,400 Years of Melancholy" (千四百年の憂鬱, Sen'yonhyaku-nen no Yūutsu); 264. "Love Overload" (愛の過充電, Ai no Kajūden); 265. "The Next Thing I Know, I'm Pouring Money into It" (気が付くと課金している, Ki ga Tsuku to Kakin-shiteiru); 266. "Don't Get Too Worked Up" (あんまりそわそわしないで, Anmari Sowasowa Shinaide); 267. "From Beyond the Sky" (遥か天空より, Haruka Tenkū yori); 268. "Heaven and Earth" (天と地と, Ten to Chi to); 269. "Five Billion Years of Solitude" (50億年の孤独, 50-okunen no Kodoku); 269.5. "You Only Get to Eat So Many Meals in One Lifetime, so Why Not Make Them Delicious?" (人生でできる食事の回数は決まってるからできるだけ美味しいものを食べたいよね, Jinsei de Dekiru Shokuji no Kaisū wa Kimatteru kara Dekiru dake Oishii Mono o Tabetai yo ne)
29	September 18, 2024	978-4-09-853572-9	August 12, 2025	978-1-9747-5596-7
270. "Far from Understanding" (理解は遠く, Rikai wa Tōku); 271. "Longing" (渇望, Katsubō); 272. "Concentration and Distraction" (集中と拡散, Shūchū to Kakusan); 273. "Win or Lose" (勝っても負けても, Kattemo Maketemo); 274. "Nasa at Night" (夜のナサくん, Yoru no Nasa-kun); 275. "Easy No-Prob Brain Worm" (脳内再生余裕, Nōnai Saisei Yoyū); 276. "NAS(A) Talk" (NASA(ナサ)トーク, Nasa Tōku); 277. "Day of Rebirth" (復活の日, Fukkatsu no Hi); 278. "Be Better than Yesterday" (昨日の自分を追い越して, Kinō no Jibun o Oikoshite); 279. "Red Thread" (赤い糸, Akai Ito); 280. "Hope Always Remains" (希望は残っているよ。どんな時にもね, Kibō wa Nokotteiru yo. Donna Toki ni mo ne); 278.5. "Malfunctioning Feelings" (制御不能の感情について, Seigyo Funō no Kanjō ni Tsuite)
30	December 18, 2024	978-4-09-853804-1	December 9, 2025	978-1-9747-5938-5
281. "Solo Sumo: Wrestling with Oneself" (一人相撲。一人でとりつづける相撲, Hitorizumō. Hitori de toritsuzukeru sumō); 282. "Pieces of the Past" (過去のカケラ, Kako no Kakera); 283. "Babamba Bam Bam Bam ♪" (ババンバ、バン、バン、バン♪, Babanba, Ban, Ban, Ban); 284. "Viva! Bam!" (ビバドン, Biba Don); 285. "Equivalent Exchange" (等価交換, Tōka Kōkan); 286. "Fragments of 1,400 Years" (1400年のカケラ, 1400-nen no Kakera); 287. "Surprises Come Suddenly" (サプライズは突然に, Sapuraizu wa Totsuzen ni); 288. "Eyes 384,000 Kilometers Away" (38万4千km(キロ)の瞳, 38-man 4-sen Kiro no Hitomi); 289. "Teach Me, My Teacher" (おしえてマイティーチャー, Oshiete Mai Tīchā); 285.5. "A Truly Pointless Romantic Interlude" (本当にどうでもいい夫婦のイチャイチャの話, Hontō ni Dōdemoii Fūfu no Ichaicha no Hanashi)
31	March 18, 2025	978-4-09-854020-4	March 10, 2026	978-1-9747-6232-3
290. "Be Careful Who You Confide In" (相談相手を選ぶのは重要, Sōdan Aite o Erabu no wa Jūyō); 291. "The Hornet and the Moon" (蜂と月, Hachi to Tsuki); 292. "The Answer You Once Sought" (かつて君が求めた答え, Katsute Kimi ga Motometa Kotae); 293. "Between Love and Uncertainty" (愛と不確実性の間で, Ai to Fukakujitsusei no Hazama de); 294. "A Maiden's Heart and a Minefield" (乙女心の地雷原, Otomegokoro no Jiraigen); 295. "The Future Continues" (続く未来, Tsuzuku Mirai); 296. "Elixer of Flight" (トブクスリ, Tobu Kusuri); 297. "Single-Minded" (一途, Ichizu); 298. "A Trial So Grueling They Call It the 'Narita Divorce'" (成田離婚なんて言葉があるくらい真価は問われる, Narita Rikon nante Kotoba ga Aru kurai Shinka wa Towareru); 299. "They Say the Best Part of Traveling Is Getting Ready to Go" (旅行は行く前が一番楽しい説, Ryokō wa Iku Mae ga Ichiban Tanoshii Setsu); 294.5 "How Many Miles to Hanky-Panky?" (イチャイチャまで何マイル？, Ichaicha made Nan Mairu?)
32	June 18, 2025	978-4-09-854151-5	June 9, 2026	978-1-9747-1659-3
300. "A Test for the Earth, a Test for the Couple" (試される大地、試される夫婦, Tamesareru Daichi, Tamesareru Fūfu); 301. "When You Travel, Let Your Feelings Show" (旅に大切なのはリアクション, Tabi ni Taisetsu na no wa Riakushon); 302. "Watch like a Hawk" (こしたんたん, Koshitantan); 303. "Hokkaido Is So Fun" (北海道って楽しい, Hokkaidō-tte Tanoshii); 304. "Even if I Become a Star" (たとえ星になっても, Tatoe Hoshi ni Nattemo); 305. "I Want to Feel Your Body's Warmth" (体温を感じたい, Taion o Kanjitai); 306. "Vaster than the Sea of Clouds" (雲の海よりも広く, Kumo no Umi yori mo Hiroku); 307. "The Goddess and I" (神様と私, Kami-sama to Watashi); 308. "A Distant Prayer" (遠い祈り, Tōi Inori); 305.5 "The Night Continues" (夜は続く, Yoru wa Tsuzuku)
33	October 17, 2025	978-4-09-854239-0	September 8, 2026	978-1-9747-6644-4
309. "That's What Life Taught Me" (命にそう教えられた, Inochi ni Sō Oshierareta); 310. "Aware of You" (君を意識する, Kimi o Ishiki-suru); 311. "Beyond Eternity" (永遠の先, Eien no Saki); 312. "Elsewhere, Meanwhile" (一方、その頃, Ippō, Sono Koro); 313. "The Okhotsk Disappearance and Appearance" (オホーツク海に消えたり 消えなかったり, Ohōtsuku-kai ni kietari Kienakattari); 314. "We're Back After a Seven-Week Break, So..." (7週間ぶりの連載再開なので…, 7 Shūkan-buri no Rensai Saikai nanode…); 315. "Mysteries Beyond the Starry Sky" (謎は星空の彼方に, Nazo wa Hoshizora no Kanata ni); 316. "At the End of the Journey" (旅の終わりに, Tabi no Owari ni); 317. "Someday... Believe" (いつか…信じて, Itsuka… Shinjite); 305.7
34	December 18, 2025	978-4-09-854386-1	December 8, 2026	978-1-9747-6913-1
318. "Stars Shine Forever" (星の輝きはずっと, Hoshi no Kagayaki wa Zutto); 319. "FLY ME TO THE MOON Episode 4: The Sorcerer's Apprentice—Chapter 1: The Witch's Forest" (FLY ME TO THE MOON(フライ ミー トゥ ザ ムーン) 第四章 魔法使いの弟子 第1話 魔女の棲む森, Furai Mī Tu Za Mūn Dai Yon-shō: Mahōtsukai no Deshi Dai 1-wa: Majo no Sumu Mori); 320. "FLY ME TO THE MOON Episode 4: The Sorcerer's Apprentice—Chapter 2: The Bride of the Louvre Forest" (FLY ME TO THE MOON(フライ ミー トゥー ザ ムーン) 第四章 魔法使いの弟子 第2話 ルーヴルの森の花嫁, Furai Mī Tū Za Mūn Dai Yon-shō: Mahōtsukai no Deshi Dai 2-wa: Rūvuru no Mori no Hanayome); 321. "FLY ME TO THE MOON Episode 4: The Sorcerer's Apprentice—Chapter 3: Promise" (FLY ME TO THE MOON(フライ ミー トゥー ザ ムーン) 第四章 魔法使いの弟子 第3話 約束, Furai Mī Tū Za Mūn Dai Yon-shō: Mahōtsukai no Deshi Dai 3-wa: Yakusoku); 322. "FLY ME TO THE MOON Episode 4: The Sorcerer's Apprentice—Chapter 4: Paper Moon" (FLY ME TO THE MOON(フライ ミー トゥー ザ ムーン) 第四章 魔法使いの弟子 第4話 ペーパームーン, Furai Mī Tū Za Mūn Dai Yon-shō: Mahōtsukai no Deshi Dai 4-wa: Pēpāmūn); 323. "FLY ME TO THE MOON Episode 4: The Sorcerer's Apprentice—Chapter 5: Connect" (FLY ME TO THE MOON(フライ ミー トゥー ザ ムーン) 第四章 魔法使いの弟子 第5話 コネクト, Furai Mī Tū Za Mūn Dai Yon-shō: Mahōtsukai no Deshi Dai 5-wa: Konekuto); 324. "See You Tomorrow" (また明日, Mata Ashita); 325. "Reincarnation" (reincarnation(リインカーネーション), Riinkānēshon); 326. "Burning Blood" (燃える血, Moeru Chi); 323.5
35	March 18, 2026	978-4-09-854485-1	–	—
327. "Bad Feeling" (バッドフィーリング, Baddo Fīringu); 328. "To You, 1,000 Years Later" (千年後の君へ, Sennengo no Kimi e); 329. "For You and Your Spouse" (君のために、君の伴侶のために, Kimi no Tame ni, Kimi no Hanryo no Tame ni); 330. "Beyond Memory" (記憶の彼方に, Kioku no Kanata ni); 331. "Episode 5: Signpost of the Stars—Chapter 1: Resemblance" (FLY ME TO THE MOON(フライ ミー トゥ ザ ムーン) 第五章 星の道標 第1話 面影, Furai Mī Tu Za Mūn Dai Go-shō: Hoshi no Michishirube Dai 1-wa: Omokage); 332. "Call of the Night?" (よふかしのうたかな？, Yofukashi no Uta ka na?); 333. "Episode 5: Signpost of the Stars—Chapter 2: In the Light" (FLY ME TO THE MOON(フライ ミー トゥ ザ ムーン) 第五章 星の道標 第2話 光の中で, Furai Mī Tu Za Mūn Dai Go-shō: Hoshi no Michishirube Dai 2-wa: Hikari no Naka de); 334. "Episode 5: Signpost of the Stars—Chapter 3: The Only Warmth" (FLY ME TO THE MOON(フライ ミー トゥ ザ ムーン) 第五章 星の道標 第3話 ただ一つの暖かいもの, Furai Mī Tu Za Mūn Dai Go-shō: Hoshi no Michishirube Dai 3-wa: Tada Hitotsu no Atatakai Mono); 335. "FLY ME TO THE MOON Episode 5: Signpost of the Stars—Chapter 4: To the Stars, To the Sky" (FLY ME TO THE MOON(フライ ミー トゥ ザ ムーン) 第五章 星の道標 第4話 星へ、空へ, Furai Mī Tu Za Mūn Dai Go-shō: Hoshi no Michishirube Dai 4-wa: Hoshi e, Sora e); Bonus Manga
36	June 18, 2026	978-4-09-854650-3	–	—
336. "FLY ME TO THE MOON Episode 5: Signpost of the Stars—Chapter 5: The Curse Continues" (FLY ME TO THE MOON(フライ ミー トゥ ザ ムーン) 第五章 星の道標 第5話 続く呪い, Furai Mī Tu Za Mūn Dai Go-shō: Hoshi no Michishirube Dai 5-wa: Tsuzuku Noroi); 337. "FLY ME TO THE MOON Episode 5: Signpost of the Stars—Chapter 6: Rondo" (FLY ME TO THE MOON(フライ ミー トゥ ザ ムーン) 第五章 星の道標 第6話 輪舞(ロンド), Furai Mī Tu Za Mūn Dai Go-shō: Hoshi no Michishirube Dai 6-wa: Rondo); 338. "Tracing the Thoughts of a God" (神の思考をたどって, Kami no Shikō o Tadotte); 339. "The Guided" (導かれし者たち, Michibikareshi Mono-tachi); 340. "Past the Signpost" (道標の先へ, Michishirube no Saki e); 341. "Signpost of the Stars" (星の道標, Hoshi no Michishirube); 342. "Starry Skies 1000 Years Later" (千年後の星空, Sennengo no Hoshizora); 343. "Between Dreams" (夢のはざまで, Yume no Hazama de); 344. "Beyond Instinct" (直感のその先, Chokkan no Sono Saki); 343.5
37	September 16, 2026	978-4-09-854813-2	–	—
345. "Princess Under the Moonlight" (月下の姫君, Gekka no Himegimi); 346. "Dance Dance Revolution" (ダンスダンスレボリューション, Dansu Dansu Reboryūshon); 347. "What Are You Looking For?" (探し物はなんですか？, Sagashimono wa Nan desu ka?); 348. "Princesses" (お姫様ズ, Ohime-sama-zu); 349. "Moonlit Night" (月夜, Tsukiyo); 350. "I Touch It Because It's There" (そこにあるから触ってしまう, Soko ni Aru kara Sawatteshimau); 351. "Someone More Meticulous than Gemini and More Competent than ChatGPT" (Gemini(ジェミニ)よりもマメで、チャッピーよりも出来る人, Jemini yori mo mame de, Chappī yori mo dekiru hito); 352. "That's How Many Are Lurking About" (大体それくらいはいる, Daitai sore kurai wa iru); 353. "Nature Is Your Friend" (自然は友達, Shizen wa Tomodachi)
