= Ad Astra per Aspera (manga) =

Japanese manga series

- Cover of the first volume

アド アストラ ペル アスペラ (Ado Asutora peru Asupera)
- Genre: Science fiction
- Manga
- Written by: Kenjiro Hata
- Published by: Shogakukan
- Imprint: Shōnen Sunday Comics
- Magazine: Weekly Shōnen Sunday
- Original run: September 2, 2015 – present
- Volumes: 1
- icon

Ad Astra per Aspera (Japanese: アド アストラ ペル アスペラ, Hepburn: Ado Asutora peru Asupera) is a Japanese manga series written and illustrated by Kenjiro Hata. It started in Shogakukan's shōnen manga magazine Weekly Shōnen Sunday in September 2015. Hata published the series on a monthly basis, with a "first season" of seven chapters published until May 2016. Hata stated that he will release a "second season", but it has not been decided when it will continue. Its chapters have been collected in one tankōbon volume as of February 2016.

== Publication ==
Ad Astra per Aspera is written and illustrated by Kenjiro Hata. In July 2015, Hata announced that he would start a monthly series to be published in Shogakukan's shōnen manga magazine Weekly Shōnen Sunday. Ad Astra per Aspera debuted in the magazine on September 2, 2015. The series' "first season" ran for seven chapters until May 11, 2016. On the same day, Hata wrote that he will continue the series with a "second season", but it has not been decided when it will continue. Shogakukan collected the first five chapters in a tankōbon volume, released on February 18, 2016.

=== Volumes ===
No.	Japanese release date	Japanese ISBN
1	February 18, 2016	978-4-09-126569-2
1-A. "Destiny"; 1-B. "Night and Fog" (夜と霧, Yoru to Kiri); 2. "Moon Pride"; 3. "The Moonlight Carries the Message of Love" (月の光は愛のメッセージ, Tsuki no Hikari wa Ai no Messēji); 4. "Beyond Good and Evil" (善悪の彼岸, Zen'aku no Higan); 5. "Will to Power" (力への意識, Chikara e no Ishiki)

=== Chapters not yet in tankōbon volumes ===
These chapters have yet to be published in a tankōbon volume. They were published in Weekly Shōnen Sunday in March and May 2016.

- 6. "Ambiguous"
- 7. "Oath" (誓いの言葉, Chikai no Kotoba)

== Reception ==
The first volume sold 16,000 copies in its first week of release.
