= Kenjiro Hata =

Japanese manga artist (born 1975)

Kenjiro Hata (畑 健二郎, Hata Kenjirō; born October 19, 1975 in Fukuoka Prefecture, Japan) is a Japanese manga artist, best known as the creator of the Hayate the Combat Butler series. He likes to collect anime related items, like figurines, and was once an assistant of Kōji Kumeta. He is married to voice actress Masumi Asano.

== Career ==
Hata created Hayate the Combat Butler, about a teenage boy who becomes a butler to a teenage girl. It was serialized in Shogakukan's Weekly Shōnen Sunday magazine from October 2004 to April 2017. Shogakukan released 52 volumes in Japan from February 2005 to June 2017. It has spawned several anime series and films.

In 2018, Hata released Fly Me to the Moon in Weekly Shonen Sunday, as he planned from late November 2016. The manga concerns a teen named Nasa, who meets a beautiful girl the day before his high school exam, but is hit by a car and saved by the girl. He confesses to the girl, but she responds that she will agree provided that he'll marry her. Years later, after forgoing high school to work, he encounters the girl again and they marry. The series continues to show their daily life as a married couple.

== Works ==
- God's Rocket Punch! (2002)
- Heroes of the Sea Lifesavers (2003)
- Thunder Goddess Sofia (2003)
- Hayate the Combat Butler (2004–2017)
- Lucky Star: Comic à la Carte (2007)
- Seiyu's Life! (2011; a dōjin manga with his wife Masumi Asano, released under the circle name Hajimemashite)
- Ad Astra per Aspera (2015–present, on hiatus)
- Fly Me to the Moon (2018–present)
