= Fly Me to the Moon (manga) =

Japanese manga series

- First tankōbon volume cover, featuring Tsukasa Tsukuyomi

トニカクカワイイ (Tonikaku Kawaii)
- Genre: Romantic comedy; Science fiction; Slice of life
- Manga
- Written by: Kenjiro Hata
- Published by: Shogakukan
- English publisher: NA: Viz Media
- Imprint: Shōnen Sunday Comics
- Magazine: Weekly Shōnen Sunday
- Original run: February 14, 2018 – present
- Volumes: 37
- Anime television series
- Directed by: Hiroshi Ikehata
- Written by: Kazuho Hyodo
- Music by: Endō
- Studio: Seven Arcs
- Licensed by: Crunchyroll; SEA: Plus Media Networks Asia (S1)
- Original network: Tokyo MX, ytv, (S1) BS NTV, (S1) BS11, (S2) AT-X (S2)
- English network: SEA: Aniplus Asia (S1)
- Original run: October 3, 2020 – June 24, 2023
- Episodes: 24 + 2 OVA
- Original net animation

Tonikawa: Over the Moon for You – High School Days
- Studio: Seven Arcs
- Licensed by: Crunchyroll
- Released: July 12, 2023 – August 23, 2023
- Episodes: 4
- icon

Fly Me to the Moon (Japanese: トニカクカワイイ, Hepburn: Tonikaku Kawaii; lit. 'Adorable Anyways' or 'Cute, No Matter What'), also known outside Japan as Tonikawa: Over the Moon for You, is a Japanese manga series written and illustrated by Kenjiro Hata. It has been serialized in Shogakukan's shōnen manga magazine Weekly Shōnen Sunday since February 2018, with its chapters collected in 37 tankōbon volumes as of September 2026. The story centers around the teenage genius Nasa Yuzaki and his developing relationship with his new wife, Tsukasa, who saves him from a traffic accident during the beginning of the story. In North America, the manga is licensed by Viz Media.

An anime television series adaptation produced by Seven Arcs aired from October to December 2020 on Tokyo MX and other channels. A second season aired from April to June 2023. A four-episode original net animation (ONA) titled Tonikawa: Over the Moon for You – High School Days was released from July to August 2023.

== Premise ==
On a snowy winter night, Nasa Yuzaki, a boy who was made fun of during his childhood because of his peculiar name, encounters a beautiful girl after he received his practice exam grades for high school. When he tries to approach her, he gets hit by a truck due to his lack of attention. However, the girl saves him, and Nasa miraculously follows her at a bus stop and proceeds to confess his love for her. The girl, Tsukasa Tsukuyomi, agrees to become his girlfriend, but only if they are married first. Nasa quickly agrees to her demand and then passes out, waking up in a hospital. Nasa becomes heartbroken when he cannot find her again, until his 18th birthday, where Tsukasa suddenly shows up at his doorstep. Tsukasa goes inside with a marriage form, starting their relationship and their marriage.

== Characters ==
Nasa Yuzaki (由崎 星空, Yuzaki Nasa (Note: His given name 星空 (Nasa), is normally read as hoshizora ("starry sky").))
Voiced by: Junya Enoki, Umeka Shōji (child) (Japanese); Zach Aguilar (English)
An everyday genius, Nasa grew up ridiculed for his strange name, similar to the American space agency NASA, although his parents meant for his name to reference the starry sky. He has a meeting with fate when he was caught in a terrible accident but was saved by Tsukasa. Declaring his love for her, on the day they met, Tsukasa agrees on the condition that he marries her to which Nasa immediately responded with an unshakable "yes". Two years later, Nasa reunites with Tsukasa carrying a marriage form which they turn in to the bureau, legalizing their relationship. Since marrying her, he becomes incredibly awkward around her, somewhat clingy to an extent because he is worried she would disappear on him again, but does his best to make her happy.
Tsukasa Yuzaki, née Tsukuyomi (由崎 司/月読 司, Yuzaki Tsukasa/Tsukuyomi Tsukasa)
Voiced by: Akari Kitō (Japanese); Lauren Landa (English)
After saving Nasa, she agrees to his confession only if he will marry her. Disappearing for two years, she returns to Nasa's side with the paperwork necessary to legalize their relationship. During the early chapters, she makes a point of the legal name change she underwent upon becoming Nasa's spouse, initially teasing him with her now being named Tsukasa Yuzaki. After she marries Nasa, she begins showing new parts of herself, such as her massive love for movies and manga. She also does not like the idea of spending a lot of money for necessities. Later on, her thoughts while observing Nasa makes it clear she loves him for being such a pure hearted, kind soul. When Tsukasa got to meet Nasa's parents, his father privately thanked her for saving his life as both gave their blessings to their newlywed life. Throughout the story, layers upon layers of mystery are laid upon her and there have been many comparisons of her similarities to Princess Kaguya. The mystery is finally resolved with the revelation that she is the daughter of a character from that story, given immortal life through the elixir of immortality which her father was ordered to burn.
Kaname Arisugawa (有栖川 要, Arisugawa Kaname)
Voiced by: Yu Serizawa (Japanese); Kayli Mills (English)
Nasa's junior and the primary caretaker of the Arisugawa public bathhouse, she is the most explicit supporter of Nasa's relationship to the point where she educates both Nasa and Tsukasa in ways of advancing their relationship as well as attempting to forcefully create situations with the same goal of relationship advancement in mind.
Aya Arisugawa (有栖川 綾, Arisugawa Aya)
Voiced by: Sumire Uesaka (Japanese); Erika Harlacher (English)
Nasa's classmate and a complete airhead, she has explicit feelings for Nasa. However, she understands the circumstances, fully supporting his relationship with Tsukasa.
Chitose Kaginoji (鍵ノ寺 千歳, Kaginoji Chitose)
Voiced by: Konomi Kohara (Japanese); Lizzie Freeman (English)
An adopted relative of Tsukasa, whom she regards as her sister. She jealously disapproves of the marriage and orders her maids Aurora and Charlotte to discredit Nasa. Until learning of the marriage, she regarded Nasa much more kindly. Her actual relation to Tsukasa is not yet clear, though both share a grand aunt, Tokiko.
Charlotte (シャーロット, Shārotto)
Voiced by: Hitomi Ōwada (Japanese); Natalie Hoover (English)
One of Chitose's maids.
Aurora (アウロラ)
Voiced by: Yuki Nagaku (Japanese); Michelle Rojas (English)
One of Chitose's maids.
Ginga Onimaru (鬼丸 銀河, Onimaru Ginga)
Voiced by: Kazuyuki Okitsu
Nasa's cousin.
Kaguya Gekkō (月光 輝夜, Gekkō Kaguya)
Voiced by: Ayane Sakura
Yaiba Shirogane (白銀 刃, Shirogane Yaiba)
Voiced by: Rika Nagae
Haru Miyako (都 春, Miyako Haru)
Voiced by: Coco Hayashi
Mishio Usa (宇佐 美潮, Usa Mishio)
Voiced by: Hina Yōmiya
Hotaru Kurenai (紅 蛍, Kurenai Hotaru)
Voiced by: Ayane Matsuda
Hakase Inukai (犬養 葉加瀬, Inukai Hakase)
Voiced by: Hitomi Ueda
Jessie Nikotama (二子玉 ジェシー, Nikotama Jeshī)
Voiced by: Kaori Maeda

== Media ==
=== Manga ===
Fly Me to the Moon is written and illustrated by Kenjiro Hata. Hata previously announced his desire to create a new series in November 2016. Fly Me to the Moon started its serialization in Shogakukan's Weekly Shōnen Sunday with a two-chapter debut on February 14, 2018. In April 2025, it was announced that the manga would enter on hiatus; it resumed on June 25 of the same year. Shogakukan has collected its chapters into individual tankōbon volumes, with the first one published on May 18, 2018. A teaser video for the second volume, featuring Japanese musical group Earphones, was released on August 17, 2018. As of September 16, 2026, 37 volumes have been published.

In February 2020, Viz Media announced that they licensed the manga for an English release. The first volume was published on September 8, 2020. As of September 8, 2026, 33 volumes have been released. On May 9, 2023, Viz Media launched their Viz Manga digital manga service, with the series' chapters receiving simultaneous English publication in North America as they are released in Japan.

A fanbook, titled Tonikaku Kawaii Kekkon Kingenshū (トニカクカワイイ公式ファンブック 結婚金言集), was released on December 18, 2020.

=== Anime ===
An anime television series adaptation was announced on March 4, 2020. The series was produced by Seven Arcs and directed by Hiroshi Ikehata, with Kazuho Hyodo writing the scripts, Masakatsu Sasaki designing the characters, and Endō composing the music. It ran for 12 episodes from October 3 to December 19, 2020, on Tokyo MX, ytv and BS-NTV. (Note: Tokyo MX listed the series premiere at 25:05 on October 2, 2020, which is October 3 at 1:05 a.m. JST.) Akari Kitō, as her character Tsukasa Yuzaki, performed the opening theme "Koi no Uta" (恋のうた; "Love Song"), while KanoeRana performed the ending theme "Tsuki to Hoshizora" (月と星空; "Moon and Starry Sky").

The second season had aired from April 8 to June 23, 2023. (Note: Tokyo MX listed the season premiere at 25:05 on April 7, 2023, which is April 8 at 1:05 a.m.) With Akari Kitō once again performing the opening theme "Setsuna no Chikai" (刹那の誓い; "Oath of a Moment"), as well the ending theme "Yoru no Katasumi" (夜のかたすみ; "In the Corner of the Night").

== Reception ==
The manga had over 250,000 copies in circulation by October 2018, over 400,000 copies in circulation by February 2019, and over 1 million copies in circulation by October 2019. By June 2022, the manga had over 4 million copies in circulation.

In 2019, Fly Me to the Moon was one of the winners of the 5th Next Manga Award in the Print category.
