= List of Kekkaishi episodes =

This is a list of episodes for the anime television series Kekkaishi, based on the manga series of the same name by Yellow Tanabe. It was produced by Sunrise, directed by Kenji Kodama, with character designs by Hirotoshi Takaya and music by Taku Iwasaki. The opening theme for all episodes is "Sha la la -Ayakashi NIGHT-" by Saeka Uura. There are four different ending themes: "Akai Ito" (赤い糸; "Red Thread") by Koshi Inaba (episodes 1–15, 38, 40, 48, 52), "Sekaijuu Dokowo Sagashitemo" (世界中どこを探しても, Sekaijū Doko o Sagashite mo; "Looking for Another World") by Aiko Kitahara (episodes 16–23, 39, 44, 51), "My Mirai" (マイミライ, Mai Mirai; "My Future") by Saeka Uura (episodes 24–30, 41, 46, 49), and "Kyukei Jikan 10pun" (休憩時間10分, Kyūkei Jikan Jippun; "10 Minute Break") by Saeka Uura (episodes 31–37, 42–43, 45, 47, 50).

It was broadcast for 52 episodes in Japan between 16 October 2006 and 12 February 2008 on Nippon Television, Yomiuri TV, and Nippon Television Network System, in the "golden" timeslot of 7 p.m. Monday. During its initial broadcast, episodes were frequently among the top ten rated anime television shows, sometimes as the only original (non-sequel) show to do so. It was later rebroadcast in Taiwan on Taiwan Television, in Malaysia on Animax Asia also (Japanese Dub with English Subtitles) 8TV and NTV7, in Hong Kong on Cable TV Hong Kong, in Philippines on Hero TV (Tagalog dubbed) and on its Competitor Animax Asia (Japanese Audio), and on GMA Network, and in Indonesia on antv, and in India on Animax India. The anime has been licensed in North America by Viz Media, which began broadcasting episodes online through Hulu.com in January 2010. The English dub of the series started airing in the United States on Adult Swim on May 30, 2010, finishing its first run on May 29, 2011. All episodes were broadcast at 12:30 a.m. ET/PT.

== Episodes ==
| No. | Title | Original release date | English air date |
|---|---|---|---|
| 1 | "Scars"; Transliteration: "Migi Ude no Kizu" (Japanese: 右腕の傷) | October 16, 2006 | May 30, 2010 |
Yoshimori Sumimura is a kekkaishi (barrier magic user) and reluctant heir to his family. Together with his neighbor Tokine Yukimura, he is responsible for defending their school, Karasumori Academy, from ayakashi (demons) attracted to the spiritual energies of its site, by using kekkai (barrier magic). When they are found chatting, Shigemori Sumimura and Tokiko Yukimura, respectively Yoshimori's grandfather and Tokine's grandmother, chastise them for talking with someone from their hated rival family. That evening, Yoshimori goes to the school and traps an ayakashi by a tree, however he is tricked into not dispelling it due to its form as a little girl. The ayakashi, named Yumigane, transforms and grows too strong for Yoshimori. Tokine arrives in time to save him, but she is injured in the process. As she recovers, Yoshimori vows to never let anyone else be hurt by any more ayakashi, as he continues five years later defending their school with his full strength.
| 2 | "Yoshimori and Tokine"; Transliteration: "Yoshimori to Tokine" (Japanese: 良守と時音) | October 16, 2006 | June 6, 2010 |
The events are shown of what Yoshimori and Tokine do on a typical day, showing Yoshimori is a slacker who sleeps through class, while Tokine is a smart and popular student. The personal lives of the two main characters are delved into a little more as well showing their relationships with their close family. Yoshimori obsesses with making pastries, specifically chocolate castle cakes. When Yoshimori and Tokine track down a frog ayakashi called Tsuchigama at night, Yoshimori wears sneakers to protect Tokine from its attacks. Yoshimori is left to restore the school grounds as he heals his wounds, by the use of his shikigami (paper dolls).
| 3 | "The Beautiful Demon Tamer"; Transliteration: "Utsukushiki Onitsukai" (Japanese: 美しき鬼使い) | October 23, 2006 | June 13, 2010 |
Yomi Kasuga, a demon tamer sent by the Urakai, arrives in town to stay at the Yukimura residence. Tokine is shocked to find out that Yomi was a former acquaintance of her father Tokio Yukimura, which forces her to recall of his death. Yoshimori and Tokine suspiciously find Yomi at the school grounds at night. On the following night, it is seen that Yomi summoned her ogre demon named Yoki after sedating Yoshimori, while she sends Tokine in a pitfall. Even though Tokine soon manages to escape, she is soon faced against Yomi. Tokine sets up a barrier around her, yet Yoki gradually tries to crush her from the outside.
| 4 | "Her Treasure"; Transliteration: "Kanojo no Torejā" (Japanese: 彼女のトレジャー) | October 30, 2006 | June 20, 2010 |
There are scenes explored of when Yomi had first received Yoki as her demon. Yoshimori, finding himself inside Yoki, manages to break through the shelled back of the demon. While Yoshimori tries to distract a regenerative Yoki, Tokine fails to kill Yomi when she had the chance. Yoki shatters his pledge ring of bondage with Yomi, all to achieve greater strength, much to Yomi's dismay. Yoshimori, who is no match against Yoki, is aided by Hakudo and Odo, who were sent by the Urakai to destroy Yoki and arrest Yomi. Shigemori and Tokiko come to aid their grandchildren in restoring the school grounds.
| 5 | "The Sweet Ghost"; Transliteration: "Okashi na Ningen Rei" (Japanese: お菓子な人間霊) | November 6, 2006 | June 27, 2010 |
Shigemori explains to Yoshimori that within the Urakai is a group of demon tamers called the Yagyou who are an operations squad of the Urakai, and that the leader of the Yagyou is Masamori Sumimura, Yoshimori's older brother. The next day, Yoshimori, and later Tokine, comes across a patissier ghost named Masahiko Tsukijigaoka, who is having trouble passing on. Masahiko tags along with the kekkaishi to hunt down a possible ayakashi. Inside the school, they find a male ghost named Murakami Masanao with a scythed hand, who had died in a car accident. Yoshimori prevents him from attacking and offers him a chance to see his daughter one more time before he rests in peace.
| 6 | "Night Blooms of Karasumori"; Transliteration: "Karasumori no Yoizakura" (Japanese: 烏森の宵桜) | November 13, 2006 | July 4, 2010 |
Because of the power of the Karasumori site, a huge cherry blossom grows in front of the school completely out of season, attracting curious students. Yurina Kanda witnesses Yoshimori conversing with a female ghost. Later on, Yoshimori overhears Kyoko and Ayano telling Yurina to come to the school grounds at night to see the cherry blossom. When Yurina decides to pass by at night, the kekkaishi arrive to take down a horde of ayakashi, as Yurina becomes traumatized from what she has seen. After Yoshimori and Tokine console her, she returns safely to her house. A day later, Kyoko and Ayano are eager to find out where Yurina had been all night long.
| 7 | "The Best Cake in the World"; Transliteration: "Saikō no Kēki!" (Japanese: 最高のケーキ!) | November 20, 2006 | July 11, 2010 |
Yoshimori meets with Yumeko Hananokoji to see the owner of a bakery, whom Masahiro had apprenticed for. Yoshimori finds out that the only way Masahiko would pass on is if he confronts his little brother Toshihiko Tsukijigaoka. When they see Toshihiko, he demands proof of his brother's existence to be brought to him the next day. Yoshimori, Masahiko, and Yumeko all pitch in to bake a cake using a special recipe. They bring the cake to Toshihiko, who is happy to know that Masahiko has cared about him all this time. Masahiko is then able to rest in peace after seeing Toshihiko smile again.
| 8 | "A Day in the Life of Yoshimori"; Transliteration: "Yoshimori na Hibi" (Japanese: 良守な日々) | November 27, 2006 | July 18, 2010 |
Yoshimori tries to improving during his training sessions, to which Shigemori notices how much power he has gained. Later at night, Yoshimori and Tokine pursue a freezing ayakashi known as Hiwatari. After Hiwatari jumps into the indoor pool to freeze the area, Yoshimori uses barriers to break the ice, while Tokine tries to capture it but to no avail. As Hiwatari attacks at full blast, Yoshimori and Tokine combine their strength to create a barrier strong enough to repel the ice back at Hiwatari. The next day, the two strive to become even stronger, as they continue to train on their own.
| 9 | "A Dangerous Teacher"; Transliteration: "Kiken na Kōkō Kyōshi" (Japanese: 危険な高校教師) | December 4, 2006 | July 25, 2010 |
At school, Yurina tells Kyoko and Ayano of her love interest in Yoshimori. A handsome teacher named Tatsumi Mino shows up secretly attacking a female student. When Yurina catches sight of this, she reports it to Yoshimori, though Kyoko and Ayano assume she was asking him out on a date. As the day progresses, Yoshimori becomes suspicious when he sees Tokine talking with Mino in the hallway. Yoshimori ponders about how to warn Tokine that Mino might be a possible dangerous player. At night, the kekkaishi sense an abnormality inside the school, only to discover the teacher with three snakes wrapped around him. Mino is recognized with supernatural powers, but is possessed by a parasitic ayakashi called a puppet insect. After the kekkaishi work to destroy the puppet insect, Mino is distraught that he had been controlled, since he is really nice by nature.
| 10 | "Shikigami Chocolate Battle"; Transliteration: "Shikigami Choko Batoru" (Japanese: 式神チョコバトル) | January 15, 2007 | August 1, 2010 |
Yoshimori as a cake lover is obsessed with the legendary chocolate cake, mentioned by his father Shuji Sumimura, that will be secretly offered early every morning to a limited number of people at a bakery. Yoshimori sends an elegant cloned shikigami in order to hold his place in line, but he loses focus at night when fighting an ayakashi called a fire mole, while the shikigami simultaneously deals with a group of thugs. Tokine reluctantly calls Yoshimori the next day for help to kill a cockroach, to which he finally manages to do so after Tokine accidentally pushes him on the ground, thereby smashing it. Yoshimori then discovers that Shigemori ate his share of the legendary chocolate cake much to his dismay. Afterwards, Tokine continuously avoids him, but eventually gives a new shirt and a piece of the legendary chocolate cake as gifts.
| 11 | "Koya and Madarao"; Transliteration: "Kōuya to Madarao" (Japanese: 鋼夜と斑尾) | January 22, 2007 | August 8, 2010 |
Yoshimori encounters and captures three minor ayakashi, them being Honetaro, Uhosuke, and Nagao. However, their leader Koya, who is a demon dog, shows up in anger. It is revealed that Koya had been a former companion of Madarao, Yoshimori's demon dog. It was a half millennium ago that Madarao and Koya were chased away by the humans from their mountainous habitat. Madarao had died of starvation, while Koya had been killed in the hands of the humans, resulting in their separation as friends. As Koya transforms into his true form, Madarao convinces Yoshimori to release his collared seal in order to transform into his true form as well. After Yoshimori carries the three followers out of the way, Tokine is to keep an eye on them, while Madarao and Koya begin to battle.
| 12 | "Sealing the Demon Dog"; Transliteration: "Yōken Madarao Fūin" (Japanese: 妖犬斑尾封印) | January 29, 2007 | August 15, 2010 |
Madarao is now weakened from his battle with Koya, who seems to still gain more power even after being poisoned. Yoshimori persuades Madarao to stand up and continue fighting. As master and dog, the two work together to strike Koya down. The dying Kouya tells Honetaro, Uhosuke, and Nagao to roam free, while Madarao, after receiving power from the school grounds, peacefully ends Koya's life. But before the group can celebrate, Madarao's true nature reveals itself as he starts attacking Yoshimori. Hakubi, Tokine's demon dog, assists Yoshimori in successfully sealing Madarao once again through much difficulty.
| 13 | "Masamori Sumimura: Chief of the Night Troops"; Transliteration: "Yagyō no Tōryō, Masamori Tōjō" (Japanese: 夜行の頭領正守登場) | February 5, 2007 | August 22, 2010 |
Yoshimori, thinking about being the legitimate successor, becomes upset when he is unable to read the family scrolls, confused as to why his older brother was not better suited as the heir. On the school grounds at night, Yoshimori and Tokine encounter a scorpion ayakashi with a foul smell named Sasorigama, greatly disrupting Madarao and Hakubi. Masamori, already aware of its presence, watches from afar to see how Yoshimori and Tokine handle it. The armored shell of this ayakashi is too tough to penetrate, however. Masamori interrupts its attack and destroys one of its blades just before it attempts to slice Yoshimori. He then create a barrier of five layers to surround Sasorigama before he destroys it. Masamori reveals to everyone that he will be staying for a few days, much to the unhappiness of Yoshimori and Madarao.
| 14 | "Masamori's Scheme"; Transliteration: "Masamori no Takurami" (Japanese: 正守のたくらみ) | February 12, 2007 | August 29, 2010 |
Yoshimori recalls of how Tokine had paid more attention to Masamori in their childhood together. Masamori lectures Yoshimori of his responsibility as the legitimate successor. At night, Yoshimori and Tokine go to the site, confused of where the ayakashi is hiding. A forest suddenly grows and envelopes the school grounds. Masamori watches from afar, as it is revealed that he was the one who created this botanical ayakashi. Using the back draft phenomenon suggested by Yoshimori, the two are able to destroy the ayakashi, which impresses Masamori.
| 15 | "Yoshimori's Ambition"; Transliteration: "Yoshimori no Yabō" (Japanese: 良守の野望) | February 19, 2007 | September 5, 2010 |
Yoshimori continues to begrudge his older brother, due to his advanced techniques. Masamori finds a birdlike shikigami without a seal sent by an unknown spy. Yoshimori confronts Masamori about the reason for watching him from afar. Yoshimori then tells Masamori that he wants to put a seal on the site, however the latter warns the former that it might trigger a disaster if done recklessly. Masamori departs afterwards, and he summons Kurohime, his demon koi, to search for anomalies, sending a dark aura around the site. The next day, Masamori says to Shigemori that Yoshimori has much more potential as a kekkaishi than he does. The family says farewell to Masamori as he takes his leave. Yoshimori asks Masamori to go bury Koya's fur on his home mountain as a favor. Yoshimori promises to himself that he will surpass Masamori and put a seal on the site someday.
| 16 | "Lord Uro of the Colorless Marsh"; Transliteration: "Mushikinuma no Uro-sama" (Japanese: 無色沼のウロ様) | February 26, 2007 | September 12, 2010 |
A strange creature shows up at school in broad daylight, discreetly stealing food from many students and leaving behind moss. Yoshimori later finds out that it is Lord Uro, with his loyal servant Mamezo, who is looking for a kekkaishi who can fix his bed, a tradition held every few decades. In the kitchen, Yoshimori makes doughnuts for Lord Uro to enjoy. At night, Toshimori becomes suspicious of this tradition with its corresponding legend. The follow morning, Yoshimori and Shigemori travel with Lord Uro to the Colorless Marsh, where he opens up a portal to a different dimension. Yoshimori follows Lord Uro into the portal, while Shigemori stays behind.
| 17 | "The Divine Field"; Transliteration: "Sore wa Kami no Ryōiki" (Japanese: それは神の領域) | March 5, 2007 | September 19, 2010 |
It is revealed that Shigemori had stay behind when Tokiko had been sent to fix the bed of Lord Oro about a half century ago. Yoshimori, having landed in the Divine Field, finds the bed of Lord Uro to be a giant ball covered with vines and trees. He jumps inside the bed, finding an empty yet broken antique box. As he restores it, the spherical bed expands, causing all the plants to disappear. When Lord Uro and Mamezo enter the orb, Yoshimori begins to feel abnormal and unstable, but maintains perseverance. After reaching his limit, Mamezo throws Yoshimori out of the orb back into the portal, where he struggles to leave the realm. It is not until he reminisces about his childhood past of being saved by Tokine that he is able to be pulled out by Shigemori. The next day at school, moss has appeared in various places of where Lord Uro had sat and touched.
| 18 | "A Day in the Life of Toshimori"; Transliteration: "Suekko Toshimori no Hibi" (Japanese: 末っ子利守の日々) | March 12, 2007 | September 26, 2010 |
A typical day for Toshimori Sumimura, Yoshimori's youngest brother, starts as he heads off to school. Two of Toshimori's friends, Gaku Mikawajima and Taichi Komagome, get into trouble for not doing their homework, and they later beg him to tutor them at his house. Toshimori is reluctant but eventually relents, though making up a story about Yoshimori being very frightening. However, when they arrive home, Yoshimori greets them while wearing his baking attire. It is mentioned that Shigemori is on a hiking trip with a group of senior citizens, while Shuji is meeting his editor for his novel. When Gaku and Taichi wander in the house, Toshimori accidentally creates a barrier and injures both of them. Tokine later visits bringing some curry over for dinner, but after she encounters a cockroach, she spills it all, with Toshimori taking the hit. After the three boys take a bath, while Yoshimori and Tokine clean up the mess, Gaku and Taichi say goodbye as they walk back to their houses.
| 19 | "Assault of the White Feathers"; Transliteration: "Shiroki Hane no Shūgekisha" (Japanese: 白き羽の襲撃者) | April 16, 2007 | October 3, 2010 |
Yoshimori, thinking back about the bed of Lord Uro, goes to his grandfather concerning the power of barriers, though he intends to use this power to put a seal on the site. At night, Yoshimori attempts to muster an ignited aura, but is stopped by Tokine. The unknown spy sends three feathered ayakashi, named Hizuki, Mizuki, and Fukuzi, to the site and has them run around the place before allowing them to run amok in order to gather information. Yoshimori encounters and attacks Hizuki, much to her anger. When the three gather together, Tokine captures Fuzuki in a barrier of three layers and destroys her thereafter. Hizuki and Mizuki combine and transform into Shirahago, being empowered by the school grounds. Shirahago launches its feathers as spears at the kekkaishi, who both shield themselves from the attack. After learning that the feathers resume their original form in order to return into its body, the kekkaishi plan their next move.
| 20 | "The Ominous Spy"; Transliteration: "Bukimi na Kanshisha" (Japanese: 不気味な監視者) | April 23, 2007 | October 10, 2010 |
Yoshimori creates a barrier surrounding Shirahago, however he is unable to stabilize it. Knowing her skills lie not in her strength but in her accuracy, Tokine creates several spiked barriers, piercing and immobilizing Shirihago, which allows Yoshimori to give the finishing blow. Yoshimori and Tokine begin to notice the spy whose human form has begun to fail. Yoshimori engages in battle with the spy, but he runs away into the nearby forest. Yoshimori tries to contain him inside the forest, but the spy drinks an experimental potion to strengthen his birdlike right arm, creating mass destruction and uses the confusion to make his escape. Yoshimori is left with the spy's sunglasses, a part of the birdlike shikigami, and his skinned right arm as evidence. As the spy tries to make his way to report back to his leader, he is sacrificed due to the side effects of the potion. Shigemori and Tokiko see the damage done to the forest. Yoshimori confesses his plan to put a seal on the site to Tokine.
| 21 | "Gen Shishio the Heartless Transfer Student"; Transliteration: "Hijō na Tenkōsei, Shishio Gen" (Japanese: 非情な転校生 志々尾限) | May 7, 2007 | October 17, 2010 |
Yoshimori and Tokine warns Mino keep a lookout for any ayakashi disguised as a human. After hearing about a new transfer student, Yurina becomes suspicious. Yurina tries to inform a half-asleep Yoshimori about the matter, but to no avail. The transfer, named Gen Shishio, then encounters this Yoshimori and punches him in the face. As it is revealed to be a cloned shikigami, the real Yoshimori senses Gen during his nap on the roof, trying to locate his presence. Yoshimori and Tokine find claw marks on the wall outside along with the remains of the shikigami. Gen later finds Mino, already aware of his supernatural powers. Yoshimori, shocked to see Gen destroy some of his crow shikigami, chases him to the roof. However, when Yoshimori puts up a barrier, Gen slashes it with his clawed hand.
| 22 | "Emissary from the Shadow Organization"; Transliteration: "Urakai kara no Shisha" (Japanese: 裏会からの使者) | May 14, 2007 | October 24, 2010 |
Yoshimori and Tokine find out that Gen is a member of the Yagyou dispatched by Masamori to help protect the site. Gen pays a visit to Shuji in order to talk to Shigemori. Meanwhile, Shigemori is seen talking to a retired university scientist professor, named Heisuke Matsudo, to speculate about the skin of the spy ayakashi. As Shigemori arrives home, he is disappointed that Gen was sent without any consent with or news from the Urakai. Masamori contacts Gen, telling him to adjust to school life, while simultaneously dealing with a spider ayakashi, called Yatsude, with ease. Yoshimori and Tokine later have trouble hunting down a lizard ayakashi, called Hitotsume Tokage, due to its speed. However, Gen shows up and defeats it with no problem. Elsewhere, Byaku, the leader of a mysterious organization, is seen talking to Princess, who seeks the power of the site.
| 23 | "In Pursuit of the Legitimate Heir"; Transliteration: "Nerawareta Seitō Keishōsha" (Japanese: 狙われた正統継承者) | May 21, 2007 | October 31, 2010 |
Kyoichi Hiba, another member of the Yagyou, comes to check up on Gen. Inside the school, Yoshimori comes across a wheeling ayakasha named Ohkubiguruma. When Gen appears and battles against Ohkubiguruma, it leads him outside for a surprise attack, temporarily injuring him. Yoshimori takes over the fight, though his barrier are to no effect. Nevertheless, with the help of Gen, Yoshimori predicts the movements of the ayakashi, leads it back inside the school, and succeeds in exterminating it. The kekkaishi realize that they are placed with a bounty by a mysterious organization. The next day, as Yoshimori lies on the roof with Gen, the former questions the latter about his body hybridized between a human and an ayakashi.
| 24 | "A Crush on Gen"; Transliteration: "Gen to Koi no Atakku" (Japanese: 限と恋のアタック) | June 4, 2007 | November 7, 2010 |
Yurina, along with Kyoko and Ayano, discovers that her friend Aoi Shinagawa has developed a crush on Gen. Yurina tells Yoshimori concerning the matter, while Kyoko and Ayano tries to talk to Gen about this as well. Aoi later shows Yurina an abandoned puppy that Gen has fed before going to school. At night, Gen lets Masamori know about the bounty that has been placed. At the site, the kekkaishi, after seeing that Gen has been captured, encounter a fox ayakashi named Youkyokusai, who is very skilled in magic. While Yoshimori distracts Youkyokusai, Tokine frees Gen. The three then conjoin their attacks in order to defeat the ayakashi. The following day, Aoi fails to sway Gen in front of her friends with a sketched portrait of him, however Gen later tells Yoshimori she would eventually hate him.
| 25 | "Tokine and the Prince"; Transliteration: "Tokine ni Ikemen" (Japanese: 時音にイケメン) | June 18, 2007 | November 14, 2010 |
Kimiya Hachioji, a famous male student, approaches Tokine at school, attracting a crowd of many of the schoolgirls. As the two leave, Yoshimori follows them, though his friends Hiromu Tabata and Tomonori Ichigaya decide not to accompany him. When Yoshimori catches up to Gen, it is seen that Kimiya is being controlled by a brainwashing ayakashi known as No Okoto, who wants to possess Tokine's body. No Okoto plans to sell information about the kekkaishi to the Kokuboro, recognized as the mysterious organization. Tokine deceives the ayakashi and attacks it until it uncovers the truth about the Kokuboro, in that it is a group of ayakashi taking on the appearance of humans who are against humankind. After No Okuto is captured and destroyed, Kimiya runs away in fear. Tokine briefs Yoshimori and Gen that they may need reinforcements from the Urakai someday soon.
| 26 | "A Night Without Yoshimori"; Transliteration: "Yoshimori ga Inai Yoru" (Japanese: 良守がいない夜) | June 25, 2007 | November 21, 2010 |
While Tokine and Gen are busy fighting off an ayakashi, a desperate Yoshimori finds another ayakashi, capturing and destroying it. However, Yoshimori ends up falling in the indoor pool, which causes him to become sick. In the Kokuboro headquarters, Aihi, a plantlike ayakashi, who is a scientist in the research department, gives her subordinate Hisui the prototype human skin suit to wear for a while. However, Kaguro, a mummified ayakashi, causes him to storm out and head toward the site, trying to prove that he can fight on his own. A bedridden Yoshimori causes worry among the other students. At night, Tokine and Gen, encounter Hisui at the site, but Shigemori, who is substituting for Yoshimori, fakes a backache to excuse himself from the fight. As Hisui, acquiring aquatic abilities, disperses into puddles of water, Tokine attempts to box him in and take him out. Even though some parts have survived, Yoshimori arrives in time to wipe him out.
| 27 | "Council of Twelve"; Transliteration: "Saikō Kanbu Jūnininkai" (Japanese: 最高幹部十二人会) | July 2, 2007 | November 28, 2010 |
Yoshimori and Yurina become aware of a black ghost cat on the shoulder of Kurosu, their literature teacher. Meanwhile, Masamori is now promoted as the seventh seat of the Junininkai, the elite executive committee of the Urakai, thought the other seats already despise him. After having informed Tokine and Gen of the situation, Yoshimori interrogates Kurosu of any association with a cat. Kurosu responds by saying that the cat had grown fond of him when he used to spend time reading outside. Matsudo tells Shigemori that the prototype human skin suit serves as an armor for the ayakashi, enabling them to be active during the day. The setback is that the skin is transient in material and restrictive in power, despite the fact that there are some ayakashi desiring to become human. Kurosu mourns for the black cat, after finding out that it had died in a car accident, allowing it to finally rest in peace.
| 28 | "The Kokuboro's Declaration of War"; Transliteration: "Kokubōrō no Sensenfukoku" (Japanese: 黒芒楼の宣戦布告) | July 9, 2007 | December 5, 2010 |
Aihi develops a durable edition of the human skin suit for four recruited ayakashi to wear. Kaguro, among the group, unexpectedly announces their arrival at the school grounds during the day to schedule a negotiation with the kekkaishi during the night. The nocturnal Sanan demands for the site to be handed over to them, but the kekkaishi reject the proposition. Gen, sensing trouble, is badly wounded in plain sight by Kaguro, having the other four take him away. The four create a dispelling square to ward off barriers, making the kekkaishi vulnerable to the attacks of the molluscan Sekia and the amphibious Haroku.
| 29 | "Seal of Dispelling"; Transliteration: "Juryoku Fūji no Mahōjin" (Japanese: 呪力封じの魔方陣) | July 23, 2007 | December 12, 2010 |
Yoshimori launches Tokine into the sky for her to cast barriers around the four human ayakashi, but the arthropodan Haizen manages to free the others by melting the barriers. The four then transform into their true forms, overwhelming the kekkaishi. Gen tries to take them head on, but is eventually halted by Kaguro. Yoshimori cleverly creates an elevating barriers for Tokine to shoot spiked barriers at Haizen, letting Yoshimori to detonate him, Tokine is then taken hostage by Sanan and Sekia after Yoshimori was able to kill Haroku. Hiba comes and tranquilizes an enraged Gen before he almost turns into a full ayakashi. Kaguro slashes Sanan and Sekia pieces thus saving Tokine, becomes intrigued when Yoshimori attempts to muster the ignited aura once again, and departs back to the Kokuboro headquarters, recovering some of the human skin suit for Aihi. Hiba tells the kekkaishi that he will report back to the Yagyou that Gen has violated the taboo of losing control of himself.
| 30 | "The Right Person for Karasumori"; Transliteration: "Karasumori no Tekininsha" (Japanese: 烏森の適任者) | July 30, 2007 | December 19, 2010 |
Gen thinks back to when Masamori had first assigned him to help protect the site, knowing that it would have been a risk on his life. Yoshimori and Tokine spot a worm ayakaski named Hazemukuri, one that is able to separate into several rubber balls. Gen suddenly appears and quickly attacks its head, then leaves without a sign of gratitude. Yoshimori and Tokine begin to wonder about Gen's troubling past. Masamori returns home the next day and joins the family for dinner. Shigemori is against Masamori joining the Junininkai, even though the latter is secretly monitoring the actions of the Urakai from endangering the site. Yoshimori tries to convince Masamori to consider having Gen resume his assignment.
| 31 | "Gen's Dark Past"; Transliteration: "Shishio Odoroki no Keireki" (Japanese: 志々尾驚きの経歴) | August 6, 2007 | January 2, 2011 |
Gen had been born as a half ayakashi, and his older sister Ryo Shishio was the only person he had trusted as a child, since he had been bullied by a boy named Tsutomu. After having overheard his father Tessai Shishio saying that he would be taken away by the Yagyou, a ballistic Gen had transformed into his true form and had run away. When Ryo had found Gen atop a tree, the latter had gravely injured the former and had tried to escape. Masamori had captured and had brought Gen back to the Yagyou headquarters, sealing his powers with a flame tattoo in order to train him to control them. After being entrusted with this story, Yoshimori, along with Tokine, goes to the school grounds to directly approach Gen about his past. Hiba comes along and confirms that Gen will continue protecting the site, though with probationary restrictions.
| 32 | "A Challenge from Atora"; Transliteration: "Kyōretsu na Atora no Shiren" (Japanese: 強烈な亜十羅の試練) | August 13, 2007 | January 9, 2011 |
Yoshimori pays a visit to Gen for lunch. Soon after, Tokine comes by with Atora Hanashima, a member of the Yagyou as a monster tamer, let alone being Gen's personal trainer. Atora gives the three a test of teamwork, taking place at the school grounds at night. The goal, being to capture Atora in a half hour unharmed, proves to be a challenge for the three. Sensuke, a groundhog ayakashi, purposely trips Tokine to prevent her from reaching Atora. The three use their combined strength to defeat Raizo, a bear ayakashi with lightning abilities. Gen uses tissue paper to plug his ears to avoid hearing Atora's commanding voice. Atora soars on Majiro, a bat ayakashi with radar senses, as the kekkaishi cast many barriers to enhance Gen's speed, though to no avail. At the last second, Gen hurls Yoshimori at Atora, catching hold of her yellow scarf, thereby passing the test.
| 33 | "Hurry Grandpa Shige!"; Transliteration: "Isoge Shige-jii Honki-bashiri" (Japanese: 急げ繁じい本気走り) | August 20, 2007 | January 16, 2011 |
Shigemori is verified by Matsudo of the location of the Kokuboro headquarters. At night Tokine and Gen are busy fighting ayakashi, and Yoshmori begins to suspect the purpose for the establishment of the Kokuboro. Shigemori, after hearing word that Matsudo is in trouble, calls for Shuji, who has basic knowledge of talismans. They meet Mukade, a member of the Yagyou, sent by Masamori to escort the two to the estate. Meanwhile at the estate, Matsudo is ambushed by Shion, a spider ayakashi, who has bypassed all the paper barriers he has set up. When Matsudo prepares to shoot Shion with a gun, the latter attaches a spider onto his neck to control him to shoot himself, and she reports back to Byaku of the matter. Shigemori and Shuji, arriving too late, are devastated by this. Yoshimori receives the news next morning, and he feels sorry for not being there with Shigemori. It is later revealed that Matsudo had sent an ayakashi wearing a cloned version of the human skin suit.
| 34 | "Call of Darkness"; Transliteration: "Tamago kara Koe: Yami no Izanai" (Japanese: 卵から声 闇の誘い) | August 27, 2007 | January 23, 2011 |
Aihi is told by Byaku to find a way to prolong Princess's life. She is then asked by Kaguro about her guise as a human, as she explains it is habitual since she had been forced and confined by a master to remain as a human, as she studying their way of life. Yoshimori, aside from his doubts about his older brother, decides to put all his trust in Gen. Later that day, Gen finds Kaguro, soon being overpowered. Kaguro gives him a purple egg, one that would be his servant when it hatches. At night, Yoshimori, Tokine, and Gen face an ayakashi named Bell Ringer, one that uses bells to create unbearable sounds waves. The kekkaishi try to hold up barriers, but they are easily shattered. They manage to destroy the bells and expel Bell Ringer, but Gen was distracted by the memory of hurting her sister. As the egg gets closer to hatching, it tries to lead him not to trust in humans. Elsewhere, Aihi suggests to Byaku that Princess should be taken to the site to prevent her from deteriorating.
| 35 | "The Kokubourou Draws Near"; Transliteration: "Semarikuru Kokubōrō" (Japanese: 迫り来る黒芒楼) | September 3, 2007 | January 30, 2011 |
Yoshimori, after having seen Gen's encounter with Kaguro, tells Tokine about this. Meanwhile, the purple egg continues to confuse Gen into joining the Kokuboro. Masamori is ordered by Ichirou Ogi, the eighth seat of the Junininkai, to execute an ayakashi terrorizing a distant village, much to his dismay. At night, Byaku prepares to transport Princess via a large insect ayakashi to the site, as the other members ready themselves to wage war. Yoshimori, irritated with being ignored by Gen, begs him to release his hidden feelings. A dark cloud the hovers over the site, unleashing an army of ayakashi.
| 36 | "Karasumori in Flames"; Transliteration: "Karasumori Enjou" (Japanese: 烏森炎上) | September 10, 2007 | February 6, 2011 |
Yoshimori, Tokine, and Gen continue to take out the army of ayakashi, with Byaku and Shion monitoring this. Gagin, a centaur ayakashi, does not like the fact that the three are the one responsible for protecting the site. After transforming into his true form, he attacks Gen head on with his flame abilities, while dodging the barriers created by Yoshimori and Tokine. Meanwhile, Masamori is still preoccupied his mission, being delayed with other members of the Kokuboro first task force. The purple eggs keeps pressuring Gen to join the Kokuboro. Madarao and Habuki then manage to distract Gagin from attacking. Gen momentarily transforms into his true form, thereby violating the taboo once again.
| 37 | "Gen Shishio's Last Stand"; Transliteration: "Shishio Gen Saigo no Tatakai" (Japanese: 志々尾限最後の戦い) | September 10, 2007 | February 13, 2011 |
Gagin is preparing to launch a giant flame ball at Yoshimori, Tokine, and Gen. Tokine sets up many barriers for Gen to charge and slash some of Gagin's arms, while Yoshimori creates a barrier to shield from the flame ball. Shigemori, accompanied by Hiba, heads toward the site, after learning that Tokiko is travelling toward the Kokuburo headquarters. Even though Gagin puts up a flame shield, Gen is able to break through it just in time for Yoshimori to deflect the flame ball. However, as Gen attempts to make the final blow, Kaguro appears and pierces Gen from behind with two deadly sword strikes. Yoshimori and Tokine destroy Gagin after Kaguro leaves, and then they tend to Gen as Shigemori and Hiba arrive, all of the hearing his dying words. Princess releases her full power out of impatience, but soon falls ill afterwards, forcing the Kokuboro to retreat.
| 38 | "Requiem"; Transliteration: "Sorezore no Chinkon" (Japanese: それぞれの鎮魂) | October 15, 2007 | February 20, 2011 |
Sakon, a lizard ayakashi, who is a subordinate of Gagin, requests that Byaku should allow him to take over leadership for the first task force. The Yagyou prepares a funeral for Gen at the Yagyou headquarters, with Hiba and Atora shaken up by the aftermath. Sen Kagemiya remembers when a calm Gen had easily defeated a jealous Shouki, as well as when he had taken on an ayakashi called Valley Jumper by himself when the other members had fled. Sen hesitates to call Gen a friend, even though his passing has not gone unnoticed. Yoshimori and Masamori pay their respects to a disdained Ryo, both apologizing for her loss. It is revealed that Ichirou is working for Byaku, staging the mission that Masamori was distracted with. Yoshimori holds back his tears for Tokine, pondering if Gen wanted to die in order to protect the site.
| 39 | "The Mystery of Karasumori"; Transliteration: "Karasumori no Nazo" (Japanese: 烏森の謎) | October 22, 2007 | February 27, 2011 |
Hekian, a cloaked ayakashi plans to draw out the former deity of the Karasumori site, who is Lord Uro, by using his thousand eyes ability. Sakon summons the ayakashi called Field Guardian to absorb the waters of a swamp, that being the Colorless Marsh. The next morning, Yoshimori and Tokine go to the dry marsh to find Lord Uro, only to be met by Mamezo, who confirms that the Kokuboro was to blame for the marsh being empty. Shigemori is aware that the Kokuburo is researching about the mysteries of Karasumori. At night, Yoshimori and Tokine come across Hekian, who uses a binding shadow attack to immobilize them. Even though he is unable to use his thousand eyes ability at the school grounds, he is able to evaluate the barrier techniques and the legitimate heirs of the kekkaishi, to which Byaku informs Princess of this.
| 40 | "A Passage to Kokuboro"; Transliteration: "Kurosusuki e no Michi" (Japanese: 黒芒への道) | October 29, 2007 | March 6, 2011 |
Tokiko has finally returned, just to announce to Tokine that she will be leaving again two days later. It is said that Tokiko will make a passageway to Kurosusuki, the dimension of the Kokuboro headquarters, without any detection. Yoshimori, bent on finding out about the passageway, is told by Tokine to wait instead, due to how dangerous the task is at hand. Masamori has managed to rebel against Ichirou by deciding to move the Yagyou headquarters to the site. He then tells his confidant Miki Hatori, the vice chief of the Yagyou, to make preparations for the move. Desperate to come with her, Yoshimori chases after Tokiko in a taxi, using various barrier techniques. At a riverbank, Tokiko, still declining his request, tells Yoshimori to continue protecting the site, since he is not strong enough to enter the dimension to Kurosusuki on his own.
| 41 | "Days in Training"; Transliteration: "Tokkun no Hibi" (Japanese: 特訓の日々) | November 5, 2007 | March 13, 2011 |
Yoshimori, taking Tokine's words decides to put aside everything to be able to train. He runs to see a shrine priest, who tells him that striking things out blindly would eventually become clear to him. That being said, Yoshimori takes some time to train with a flock of crows near the shrine. Yoshimori seems to become exhausted from training after two days. Tokine gives him advice for training, though mistaking the description of crows with that of cockroaches. Using this knowledge, Yoshimori improves greatly against the crows on the third day. The shrine priest compares life to sweeping leaves on a windy day, in which one must to be enlightened by their surroundings. At night, Yoshimori puts his sense of enlightenment to the test when the site is invaded by quite a few shady characters.
| 42 | "Night Troops Arrive"; Transliteration: "Yagyō no Menmen" (Japanese: 夜行の面々) | November 12, 2007 | March 20, 2011 |
Yoshimori and Tokine feels quite crowded when the Yagyou move into the neighborhood. The former is further surprised to see that his older brother has ordered a few of his troops to assist the kekkaishi in the protection of the site. He becomes depressed after being reminded of Gen's death, leaving Tokine and the troops defeat a group of bee ayakashi by themselves. While taking a walk toward Gen's old apartment, he comes across Atora, who consoles him by recognizing her jealousy because she had never seen Gen smile before. As he heads home, he finds himself being followed by Sen and his two friends.
| 43 | "Resurgence"; Transliteration: "An'un no Sairai" (Japanese: 暗雲の再来) | November 19, 2007 | March 27, 2011 |
Yoshimori leads Sen, along with his friends Shu Akitsu and Dai Yaegashi, into a forest where he engages a friendly battle with them. Yoshimori easily overpowers Shu and Dai, but Sen manages to sneak right behind Yoshimori. However, at that moment, an ignited aura, recognized as a zekkai (absolute barrier), surrounds Yoshimori causing Sen to back away. Sen talks about how Gen had taken on many ayakashi by himself. After Masamori plays shogi with Toshimori, he informs Yoshimori that his first priority is to protect the site, not to seek revenge on Kaguro. Meanwhile, Sakon prepares for an assault on the site. Tokine is uncertain if the site can still be protected even with the Yagyou as backup. At night, the kekkaishi and the Yagyou wait for the enemies to approach.
| 44 | "The Battle of Karasumori"; Transliteration: "Karasumori no Gekisen" (Japanese: 烏森の激戦) | November 26, 2007 | April 3, 2011 |
The kekkaishi and the Yagyou easily fend off a horde of ayakashi. Yoshimori, still having his mind set on avenging Gen, later leaves the battlefield in search of Kaguro. Sakon creates a whirlwind as he lands onto the school grounds. Yaichi and Tsukinojo, Atora's horse and bird ayakashi, seem to be no match against Sakon. Yoshimori finds Kaguro, but it turns out that it is actually Shion wearing the same human skin suit Kaguro had worn in disguise. Yoshimori allows himself to be taken by Shion to go to Kokubouro in order to get to Kaguro. Unfortunately, Sen, who was tailing Yoshimori, gets caught as well. Masamori, ready to battle, is distraught when Sakon takes Atora as a hostage to complicate matters.
| 45 | "Kokuboro's Hostage"; Transliteration: "Kokubōrō no Hitobashira" (Japanese: 黒芒楼の人柱) | December 3, 2007 | April 10, 2011 |
Tokine manages to infiltrate Kurosusuki by following Shion. Masamori frees Atora and destroys Sakon in his true form with ease. As the Yagyou recuperate, he discovers that both Yoshimori and Sen are missing and that they are both currently in the Kokubouro headquarters. Yoshimori is restrained by Shion's spiderwebs, but his absolute barrier repels anything else Shion tries to do to him. Byaku arrives and tries to plant a worm inside Yoshimori, only to be resisted as well. Masamori gathers any available troops to head to the Kokuboro headquarters. Hekian is told by Koshu, an octopus ayakashi, who is an architect in the general affairs department, that the castle has been in ruins for three hundred years. Matsudo, along with his demonic companion Kagami, busts through the ceiling, scares Shion away, and frees Yoshimori under agreement in which Yoshimori must not touch his "white" target. Matsudo destroys the castle buildings while Yoshimori heads off to find Kaguro.
| 46 | "Through the Maze"; Transliteration: "Ikai no Meiro" (Japanese: 異界の迷路) | December 10, 2007 | April 17, 2011 |
Tokine gets through the main entrance of the castle, destroys Koshu in his true form, and continues her search for Yoshimori. As he is finding his way in the castle, Yoshimori sees Kaguro and stops only to contemplate about his current duties. He decides that his revenge will have to wait because his most important mission as of now is to locate and save Sen. While aimlessly searching the castle, he encounters Princess, unknowingly receiving the knowledge of the castle after unshackling her chains. After realizing his way within the castle, Yoshimori manages to find and save Sen. Meanwhile, Matsudo finally comes across Byaku, who appears to be the "white" target in the search for settling a score.
| 47 | "Byaku and Matsudo"; Transliteration: "Innen no Ketchaku" (Japanese: 因縁の決着) | December 17, 2007 | April 24, 2011 |
Matsudo soon corners Byaku, revealed to be nine years older than him. Fifty years ago, he had found out that Byaku had been performing experiments on his wife Risa Kagami, causing her to die. Traumatized by his love for her, Matsudo had bounded a contract with a demon in exchange for his soul. Matsudo refers Byaku of being empty, indifferent of his feelings. Byaku had believed he was manipulated with his love for Risa. After a failed experiment, Risa had become disfigured, stabbing herself and having the house set on fire. Matsudo had known that Risa wanted to stay young to prevent Byaku from leaving her side. When Byaku attacks Matsudo with his worms, Kagami deals a crushing blow to Byaku's chest, disabling him on the ground. Matsudo then stabs Byaku with his cane, after the latter says that he had felt no love for his wife.
| 48 | "The Collapsing Castle"; Transliteration: "Kuzureyuku Jōkaku" (Japanese: 崩れゆく城郭) | December 24, 2007 | May 1, 2011 |
As the castle begins to fall apart, the Yagyou heads into Kurosusuki along the passageway created by Tokiko. Yoshimori rescued Sen and tells him to go back home while he still can. Wanting to be of some use to Yoshimori, Sen offers to help locate Kaguro. With Sen's help, Yoshimori speeds off to find Kaguro and leaves Sen behind. Tokine manages to find the whereabouts of Yoshimori with Sen's information and heads off to Yoshimori with the intention of bringing him back to Karasumori before the castle completely collapses.
| 49 | "Flower of Sorrow"; Transliteration: "Kanashiki Yōka" (Japanese: 哀しき妖花) | January 14, 2008 | May 8, 2011 |
Aihi rescues Tokine, who was about to fall into the depths of the castle. After taking Tokine to her laboratory, Aihi reveals that she lacks the evil aura because she had fallen in love with an ill man after being sealed in his house for a while. Shortly after Tokine leaves, Kaguro appears in front of Aihi, who forces her to battle him in her true plantlike form. However, Kaguro bluffs her with an illusion and defeats her when she reverts back. Though Kaguro believes that Aihi became weak from losing her desire to eat humans, but Aihi claims that Kaguro is also weak because he is insecure. In the exact moment where Kaguro is about to destroy Aihi, he senses Yoshimori's presence and heads off to him. Aihi transforms back into her true form and releases her florets, one of which makes its way back to the ill man whom she had loved, who is now of old age.
| 50 | "The Final Battle!"; Transliteration: "Saishū Kessen!" (Japanese: 最終決戦!) | January 21, 2008 | May 15, 2011 |
Tokine is finally reunited with Yoshimori in Kurosusuki, but without any time to waste, Yoshimori immediately goes into battle to settle his revenge with Kaguro. Yoshiori has trapped Tokine inside his barrier, yet she manages to pass through using a technique her grandmother taught her. Kaguro slashes through all the barriers Yoshimori puts out, though almost caught off guard by his absolute barrier. When Kaguro had been a human long ago, he had been beaten against his rival Sakai in a kendo match. Later on, Sakai had recalled when Kaguro defended him against a group of thugs, recognizing his talents as a swordsman. However, Kaguro had taken this the wrong way, recklessly swinging his sword. Kaguro, influenced by three ayakashi, had killed Sakai, after the latter had hesitated to strike back.
| 51 | "Yoshimori and Kaguro"; Transliteration: "Yoshimori to Kaguro" (Japanese: 良守と火黒) | January 28, 2008 | May 22, 2011 |
Kaguro says that one must cut ties with humankind in order to become stronger. Tokine and Sen appear to show how Kaguro's blades could penetrate the barriers. When Kaguro charges at Yoshimori again, Sen steps in to deflect the attack. All of a sudden, Yoshimori instinctively unleashes a shinkai (true barrier) to defeat Kaguro. Yoshimori loses consciousness in the process, trapping both Sen and himself within. Although the Yagyou arrives, they are left helpless, as they can only stand back. Sen attempts to wake Yoshimori up, while Masamori tries to break through using his absolute barrier.
| 52 | "The End of Kokuboro"; Transliteration: "Kokubōrō no Shūen" (Japanese: 黒芒楼の終焉) | February 11, 2008 | May 29, 2011 |
Running out of time, Tokine rashly decides to jump straight into the true barrier of Yoshimori, effectively managing to reawaken him from his trance. The Yagyou, along with Yoshimori and Tokine escape the crumbling world of Kurosusuki, travelling back through the passageway. Princess turns the castle into a golden field, as Byaku carries her on his back, reminiscing about his first encounter with her. Shigemori and Tokiko connect themselves within the passageway, preventing destruction. Yoshimori confesses to Tokine that he had to avenge Gen's death in order to move on in life. The Yagyou takes their leave after the mission has finally been completed. Yoshimori and Tokine resume their normal position at the Karasumori site.

== See also ==
- List of Kekkaishi chapters
- List of Kekkaishi characters
