= List of Kekkaishi characters =

This is a list of main characters from the manga Kekkaishi by Yellow Tanabe and the anime television series adapted from it. Kekkaishi is about teenagers Yoshimori Sumimura and Tokine Yukimura, heirs to rival clans of kekkai (barrier magic) users, who must defend their school from the spirits drawn to the sacred land it is built upon.

== Protagonists ==
=== Yoshimori Sumimura ===
Voiced by: Hiroyuki Yoshino, Ryoko Shiraishi (young) (Japanese); Vic Mignogna, Cindy Robinson (young) (English)

Yoshimori Sumimura (墨村 良守, Sumimura Yoshimori) is the main male protagonist. A 14-year-old middle school boy at the beginning of the story, Yoshimori is the 22nd Kekkaishi of the Sumimura family. Throughout the series, Yoshimori is portrayed as a lazy, stubborn, headstrong individual who strives to protect his family and friends, especially Tokine, who he's had feelings for since childhood. When Yoshimori was much younger he often cried a lot and strongly disliked being a Kekkaishi. Yoshimori's attitude greatly changed, however, after Tokine's arm was injured by an ayakashi that Yoshimori failed to eliminate. At the beginning of the series, he is often seen baking, an activity he often finds more important to him than his duty as a Kekkaishi. He dreams of becoming a patissier, but is often chastised by his grandfather for this hobby.
Yoshimori's skills as a Kekkaishi differ from those of his counterpart, Tokine. Due to his rash and headstrong personality, Yoshimori has always fallen behind Tokine in terms of speed and accuracy. However, in terms of sheer power and stamina, Yoshimori excels. He is capable of creating extremely powerful and large kekkai, kekkai which Tokine is either incapable of forming or those which would quickly exhaust her. Throughout the series, observations had been made by Shigemori Sumimura and Masamori Sumimura that Yoshimori has an enormous wellspring of latent abilities in his kekkai. It has also been noted that Yoshimori is able to activate a Zekkai without any particular training beforehand. It manifests itself as black fire around him. However, his Zekkai is incomplete due to his lack of negative emotions. In his fight with Kaguro, it is revealed that he is much more adept with Shrinkage and could only be powered to its full potential in moments when his emotions overflow their boundaries. Only three occasions have been shown with him using his fully powered Shrinkage in the current running of the series: once while fighting against Kaguro, saving his brother Masamori from getting hit by a fatal attack, and after Hiura is severely injured. This state rejects everything he doesn't like, including death. It is later revealed by Hazama that this is actually a different technique entirely, called Shinkai, which up until then he was unable to use unless a powerful being lent him the power to trigger it without the necessary training.
The death of Gen has also drastically changed his views, leading him to desire becoming more powerful. He sees Hiura in a similar state as Gen, and told Hiura that if he wants to kill someone, kill him first. Yoshimori didn't trust either at first but began to warm up to them as they fought together.
Yoshimori's power has recently undergone a significant change. At the behest of his grandfather, Yoshimori underwent special training with Shimano, a two-tailed cat spirit, to learn a technique that could untap the full potential of his power. After several weeks of training, Yoshimori learns to enter a mental state called musou, in which he is distanced from emotion and in a state of pure focus. While in musou, not only does Yoshimori's efficiency with power increases exponentially, he also gains speed and accuracy greater than that possessed by Tokine. Yoshimori is now training to enter "ultimate musou", a state in which not only will his full power be unlocked, but will enable him to summon his "landlord", a powerful guardian spirit which serves as an anchor to his heart/emotions. He is referred to as a sympathizer for Karasumori, he can communicate directly with the landlord as such.
As of chapter 266 Yoshimori has summoned his landlord, Shiguma, and can enter "Musou" state at will. In this state, Yoshimori not only can create seemingly indestructible kekkai, but also create large numbers of them with no visible signs of fatigue or strain. In chapter 273, Okuni reveals to Masamori that Yoshimori is an extremely rare human being that is compatible with Karasumori and if Karasumori chooses, Karasumori can share his massive 'spiritual reservoir' that has the power potential to destroy the world with Yoshimori.
He is currently being taught by Tokimori Hazama and his mother's shikigami on how to permanently seal the lord (Chūshinmaru) using his shinkai. This training is being done away from Karasumori. When not in training, he carries the lord in an orb that he wears around his neck. This is so Yoshimori can properly protect the lord and call upon the lord's power when he needs it. It has been mentioned by Hazama to himself that Yoshimori is the sacrifice needed to seal Chūshinmaru.

=== Tokine Yukimura ===
Voiced by: Rie Saitou (Japanese); Laura Bailey (English)

Tokine Yukimura (雪村 時音, Yukimura Tokine) is Yoshimori's childhood best friend and "partner", but most notably, is also his love interest. Tokine is 16 years old and the 22nd Kekkaishi of the Yukimura family. She bears a scar on her right hand, which she received while protecting Yoshimori in their childhood. Tokine is gifted with great accuracy and precision, however, her kekkai are very weak and can only be maintained for short periods of time; her kekkai lack the "brute power" of Yoshimori's kekkai. At first she attempts to make up for this by copying Masamori's technique of stacking several kekkai's around a target, however effective, this takes too much stamina for her, making the technique ill-suited for her. Later, she learns to refine her kekkai into narrow "spears" that can impale and imprison an enemy, making up for her lack of power. She also has the ability to manipulate kekkai and space, this is seen when she cannot dispel Yoshimori's kekkai and so manipulates it so she is able to pass through it and then again during the time a user kidnaps members of the Yagyou she uses his portal to enter the dimension he created. Tokine is clearly impressed by the power and potential Yoshimori has, but is constantly frustrated by his poor control and lazy attitude. She cares for Yoshimori and often protected him many times when he was younger. She also likes to tease him and isn't aware of his feelings for her, although as the story progresses she begins to shows signs of deeper affection for Yoshimori; she once slapped him so hard that he passed out for going off to fight Kaguro, and she trapped him with neshi and beat him when he left to Okuni without her. In the series, it is stated that whilst she may be the weakest Kekkaishi, she is clearly the most "ruthless", unless she must face her biggest fear: the cockroach. Examples of her ruthless pragmatism are her disregard for the health of Hachiouji Kemiya when he was possessed by an ayakashi and forbidden metsu of a shin'yūchi god that had invaded Karasumori and attacked its defenders. After training relentlessly with Mikeno, a Nekomata (two-tailed demon cat), Tokine is told that her responsibility is to, alone, convince the lord of Hakuma, Mahora-sama, to hand over his domain so that it may be used in the sealing of Karasumori.

=== Gen Shishio ===
Voiced by: Eiji Miyashita, Mayumi Tanaka (young) (Japanese); Grant George, Laura Bailey (young) (English)

Gen Shishio (志々尾 限, Shishio Gen) first appeared in volume 6 of the manga and in episode 21 of the anime. Shishio aids Tokine and Yoshimori in hunting ayakashi and protecting Karasumori. He is an "integrated half ayakashi" (ayakashi majiri), meaning he can transform part or all of his body into that of an ayakashi. He was frequently bullied by other children when he was young. When his power first fully awakened when he was ten, he almost killed his older sister though only severely injuring her. Afterwards he was taken in by Masamori and the Yagyou, where he was taught by Atora. Gen learned how to control his full ayakashi mode during a fight with a high level ayakashi from Kokuboro, but before he could finish his opponent, Kaguro — another high-level ayakashi from Kokuboro — killed Gen. Gen's death deeply affected his allies and Yoshimori.

=== Souji Hiura ===
Souji Hiura (氷浦 蒼士, Hiura Sōji) nearly kills Yoshimori when he appears in the Hidagou while retrieving evidence of being involved in hunting. He later appears in chapter 223 on orders to assist in helping the Kekkashi. He's revealed to be raised on being a "puppet" that follows orders and thinks about nothing, he as a result has a mindset similar to a child and is fascinated by even a simple lead pencil. Yoshimori's words eventually cause him to question orders and change his mindset leading him to hesitate in delivering a killing blow.
He is a power-shifter user, his ability ranges from channeling his power into creating blades, forming it all over his body into a barrier, and using it as a spring in his muscles and he can freely change the size, shape, or angle of the blade. He can also create them from anywhere on his body. He thinks of nothing while using them, allowing his mind to float outside time, showing him where to move next.
He was named by Suigetsu, originally known as Sangou (参号, Sangō). After the invasion plan he was injured by Shichirou Ougi by accident and as a result triggered the white zekkai. He was healed by Night Troop's medical team but soon afterwards, disappears. In chapter 308, he is seen in the company of Zero and the Sousi helping in the attack on the Arashizaki Shrine and the Ougi clan. It is revealed later by Shichirou that he was sent to Karasumori in order to kidnap one of the Kekkaishi from either of the Sumimura or Yukimura clans, as he was the weakest amongst all of them.

== Antagonists ==
=== Kokuboro ===
The members of Kokuboro: from left to right: Aihi, Gagin, Byaku, Hekian, Koshu, Kaguro, and Shion.

The Kokuboro (黒芒楼, Kokubōrō) are a group of ayakashi who seek Karasumori's power in order to regenerate their leader, Princess. Kokuboro is also the name of the group's castle and the alternate world where they reside. They are the first major antagonist in the first half of the manga series, and the main antagonists in the anime. Their home is a region called the "Black Pampas Grass" (黒芒, Kurosusuki).

Princess (姫, Hime)
Voiced by: Naoko Matsui (Japanese); Stephanie Sheh (English)
A nine-tailed fox that is able to take on a human shape, she is a demon whose powers nearly rival those of a god, the most prominent display of her power being the creation of Kokuboro's castle and the alternate dimension in which it resides. However, she is afflicted with a mysterious illness and, following the ending of the Kokuboro arc, an unexplained illness that leaves her bedridden and unable to move. She eventually perishes at the ending of the Kokuboro arc as the illness claims her life, and transforms back into a nine-tailed fox. When Yoshimori meets her, he notes that even though she is an ayakashi, she has an air of elegance and respectability around her that is comparable to a princess in contrast to "common" ayakashi auras which apparently arouses hatred and a sense of disgust.
Byaku (白)
Voiced by: Kenjiro Tsuda (Japanese); Roger Craig Smith (English)
79 years old. However, looks to be around his late 20s to early 30s due to experimentation on his body he had received years previously. Strong follower of the "princess". Has an oversized left eye, with several special abilities that include being able to control bug ayakashi, controlling minds, regeneration, and gathering information from bug ayakashi that enter his body through it. Was thought to be an ayakashi, but he is actually still a human whose name is Shiranuma (白沼). Was believed to be killed by his former colleague and love rival Heisuke, and Heisuke's summoned demon servant, Kagami, but survived to carry out Princess as the Black Pampas Grass collapsed with her demise, the collapse of the dimension killing him as well.
Aihi (藍緋)
Voiced by: Sachiko Kojima (Japanese); Mary Elizabeth McGlynn (English)
A scientist with blue hair, and high-level demon, her true form a flower-like cyclops. Years ago, as she was hunting humans, befriended a weak, young man who was, surprisingly not afraid of her. She became curious of him, they eventually developed a sort of friendship. Sensing he was dying, he lured her to his house and trapped her using special talismans so she could stay for the few months until his death. Eventually she came to like him, and after the sudden change in his brother's death that give him the will to live makes her envious of humans, wishing to be like them and abstaining from eating them if possible. Having been controlled by Byaku, she is forced into working for him in developing the human skin suits modeled after the man she met. Though free of Byaku's worms, Aihi fights with Kaguro as she tries to escape from the dimension and is mortally wounded. Dying, she releases dandelion-like seeds from her body, one of which was saved by Shion before she left. In the anime, one of her seeds is able to escape the dimension and return to the home of the man, now elderly.
Gagin (牙銀)
Voiced by: Kenta Miyake (Japanese); Keith Silverstein (English)
With no human skin, he looks like a centaur with six arms. With skin on he looks like a large man (easily 2 meters tall) with ancient warrior armor on with spiky gray hair. He appears to have a short temper and is easily one of the most reckless in the Kokuboro and has a great desire to find strong opponents when the opportunity is given to him. He is very powerful and can throw balls of fire in battle that vary depending on his will. They can range from small, but fast, to immeasurable large and powerful, he was even capable of being able to nearly defeat Gen Shisho (who had completely transformed into his ayakashi form) and Yoshimori and Tokine simultaneously all by himself. Was killed by Masamori's zekkai in the manga, and in the anime by Yoshimori's kekkai.
Shion (紫遠)
Voiced by: Masako Katsuki (Japanese); Tricia Pierce (English)
She can control spider-like creatures to force others to do as she tells. She appears to be one of the most laid-back among the Kokuboro, but has proven herself to be a capable opponent as she was able to kill Heisuke by making him become host to her spiders and forced his arm to shoot himself, but this was later proven untrue as it was a weak Ayakashi that Heisuke had try on the human skin that he had taken from one of the ayakashi that was discovered by Yoshimori's grandfather. Once dressed up as Kaguro to lure Yoshimori to Kokuboro and while she had captured him, she had restrained Yoshimori under her spider creatures. She never participated in fighting the intruders during the destruction of their headquarters. She is also one of the few head officers of Kokuboro to survive the battle alongside Hekian who she had quickly taken under her control for his arrogant comments and knowledge of an escape route before leaving the collapsing dimension. She is also revealed to never have been controlled by one of Byako's worms like the rest of Kokuboro and had simply been faking it, as she stated to Hekian, because she had liked living with the organization as a home and being able to do as she pleased.
Koshu (江朱, Kōshu)
Voiced by: Nobutoshi Canna (Japanese); Sam Riegel (English)
Works at the "general affairs department". His job was to maintain and redesign the castle of Kokuboro when need be. As such he is very protective of it, willing to fight any intruders that try to enter it despite his limited powers (this results in his demise in both versions of Kekkaishi). When he has no human skin, he looks like an angry octopus with long tentacles. When he has his human skin on, he looks like an extremely small man with glasses and wears a flamboyant priest-styled kimono. He is considered one of the weakest of the Kokuboro higher-ups as he did not last long in a fight in the manga or anime. Was killed by Yoshimori in the manga, and by Tokine in the anime.
Hekian (碧闇)
Voiced by: Kenshō Yamamoto (Japanese); Richard Cansino (English)
Works at the "bureau department". With human skin, he usually has a turban and draping garments, making it impossible to see his face. He appears to possess an ability that he calls the "Thousand Eyes", this allows him to be able to see spiritual energy to such a level that he can see past the swamp like water that covers the previous Landlord of Karusmori, however only states that he could see that there was a bottomless darkness that could be seen. He is considered one of the weakest amongst his group as even Shion was able to easily defeat him and put him under control with little effort. He is later on, at the end of the battle at Kokuboro, taken by surprise and controlled by one of Shion's spiders and turned into one of her subordinate puppets after he revealed he knew a way out in a condescending manner.
Kaguro (火黒)
Voiced by: Hiroaki Hirata (Japanese); Troy Baker (English)
A S-Class Ayakashi, Kaguro is one of the few members of the Kokuboro to act on his whim while possessing superhuman speed and able to generate blades from his body. Kaguro was once a human swordsman named Genichiro Kuroda (黒田 源一郎, Kuroda Gen'ichirō), a student of a dojo who was friends with his rival Sakai. But unable to beat Sakai, Kuroda's frustration and his friend's advice, misunderstanding the meaning, led him to go on a killing spree. In the process, Kuroda lost his humanity and killed Sakai prior to assuming his current form. Donning a human skin and leading a group of Akayashi in an attempt to take over Karasumori, Kaguro develops an interest in Yoshimori, who is unknowingly able to use Zekkai, a technique that Kaguro saw first hand when he was still human. After killing Gen, whom he attempted to have walk in his footsteps, Kaguro battles Yoshimori in the collapsing Kokuboro castle before being killed in battle by the kekkaishi.
Haroku (波緑)
Voiced by: Daisuke Nakamura
When turned into a beast, he looks quite like a frog with long hair. Was killed by Yoshimori.
Sekia (赤亜)
Voiced by: Setsuji Satoh (Japanese); Steve Staley (English)
Looks like a squid with four eyes when he has no human skin. Was killed by Kaguro.
Haizen (灰泉)
Ayakashi in human skin that has the power to melt kekkai with a green substance from his mouth. Was killed by Tokine's arrow-like kekkai.
Sanan (茶南)
Voiced by: Shunsuke Sakuya (Japanese); Richard Cansino (English)
Looks like a bat with two eyes parallel to each other. Was killed by Kaguro.
Observer (監視者, Kanshisha)
Voiced by: Takuma Takewaka (Japanese); Keith Silverstein (English)
An unnamed agent of Kokuboro as well as its first notable on-screen one, his main purpose is to collect data and return it to headquarters. He was first detected by Masamori, and then after a skirmish with the Shirahago, his skin begins to deteriorate and then is discovered by Yoshimori. After a short fight with the kekkaishi, he returns to Byaku, only to die after handing over the information. His only known power is that he can stretch his arm to any length and bend it as much as he desired.
Sakon (左近)
Voiced by: Katsuyuki Konishi (Japanese) David Vincent (English)
Works at the executive department and is Gagin's right hand man. He replaced Gagin after his death as leader of the executive department and launched an attack on Karasumori but was defeated by Masamori's zekkai. With no human skin, he looks like a giant demon lizard. He has the power to control wind and use it as tornadoes for attack. The princess is shown to have great disdain for Sakon, as he possesses an evil aura greater than Gagin's, and she cannot tell what he is really thinking.

=== Nichinaga Oumi ===
Nichinaga Oumi (逢海 日永, Oumi Nichinaga), also known as the Sousui (総帥, Sōsui), is the founder of the Shadow Organization, and seeks to completely destroy it for revenge; the shin'yūchi hunts are confirmed to be somewhat planned by him. He seems to be interfering with his brother's schemes and looks down on him. He seems to hold Sangou (Hiura) and Zero in some regard, as Shichiro Ougi mentioned that he was told not to harm Hiura (after slicing him with a wind blade, thinking him to be Ichigou). Although he has yet to display the vast majority of his skills, it is known that he, like his brother, has two skills, one being the power to control earth and the other being the ability to manipulate and read minds. However, his psychic form is different from his brother's, with his being a sea serpent while his brother's is a spider-starfish. As of chapter 304, it has been revealed that the Oumi brothers were able to live so long because they would "hop" from body to body, thus no longer being "human". He is currently, after capturing and brainwashing two thirds of the Ougi clan men under the ruse of hunting the Arashizaki Shrine, in the process of attacking the Shadow Organization main headquarters.

=== Shichirou Ougi ===
Shichirou Ougi (扇 七郎, Ōgi Shichirō), also known as the "Shinigami." He's the Legitimate successor for the Ougi clan (a clan of hired assassins under the current employ of the Sousui) and has killed his brothers and several members of the Shadow Organization before escaping Masamori. He visits Karasumori to see if he had anything in common with Yoshimori, only to wind up in a fight and destroyed the school. The next day he had a chat at a cafe with Tokine. During the invasion arc he attempted to kill the invasion party as per his orders by mistakenly attack Hiura. He sent his healers to treat him. Because of his wounding of Hiura, and because the Sousui planned on "hunting" the Araskizaki shrine the Ougi clan protects, the Sousui terminated their professional relationship.
At the present point in the story, Shichirou is one of the most powerful characters, easily slicing through Yoshimori's strongest kekkais, buildings, and people with just a twitch of his wrist while hovering in midair
Similar to Yoshimori, he has never felt a limit to his power. He also sees everything as balance scale and his scales have never been moved. He views his life as a Legitimate successor was destined against his wishes. He and Yoshimori can understand each other and are similar.
He has been receiving visits at night from Tokimori Hazama, who has been giving him a history of the Ougi clan.
As of Chapter 309, two thirds of his men have been captured and brainwashed by the Sousui. He has vowed to rescue them, even though his father has cut them off as being a liability to the clan.

=== Zero ===
Zero (零（ゼロ）) is one of the "puppets" raised to fight and a subordinate of Oumi, he's the one who killed Okuni. He's offered to help Masamori protect karasumori under Oumi's orders. He's a Jiugenka power-user.

=== Ichigo ===
Ichigo (壱号, Ichigō) is one of the "puppets" raised to fight he's considered a failure. He uses a katana and shadow hands to trap and cut enemies. He could cut through a regular Kekkai with ease, but not a "Musou" enforced kekkai. He and Kakeru were the only ones of the invading party to survive.

=== Nigo ===
Nigo (弐号, Nigō) is one of the "puppets" raised to fight he's considered a failure. He has bird wings and is capable of creating black flames, his full form makes him even more like a crow. He was killed by Shichirou Ougi.

=== Kakeru ===
Kakeru (カケル) is one of the two women involved in the shin'yūchi hunting, she views herself as a chosen person and wants to cause those who lack power to feel their worthlessness even going so far as to threaten to destroy the town where Karasumori is located. She views Michiru with high regards. She was a child prodigy. She managed to regenerate after Shichirou Ougi attacked her but was distraught over Michiru's death. She is plotting her revenge against the Sousui and the kekkaishi of Karasumori for the death of Michiru, stating she is going to "end everything in this world."
She has a vast spiritual reservoir basically making her immortal. She was initially chosen by Michiru for part of the puppet program because Michiru thought she was a boy. When she was found to be a girl, Michiru ordered Ichigou to kill her. He killed her three times and she kept reviving. Michiru saw her potential and began teaching her to be a majinai, naming her Kakeru and eventually making Kakeru her assistant.

=== Michiru ===
Michiru (ミチル) is one of the two women involved in the shin'yūchi hunting, she is the calmer one of the two. She was a child prodigy, she was killed by Shichirou Ougi.

=== Suigetsu ===
Suigetsu (水月) takes care of Hiura and Oumi. Suigetsu is a log-keeper, which means she's able to retain vast amounts of information. Log-keepers are easily identifiable by their special eyes, which have something like four black marks around the pupil. She is believed to store most or even all of the information of the Shadow Organization, including its history and almost everything else. She is a very special person to Oumi, as he treats her kindly and says that she's the last person he'd kill, although near the end of the series he tells her that he did not plan on killing her from the very beginning. It has been revealed that she is Oumi's wife and the founder went as far as wooing her without using his psychic powers. Suigetsu can transform into a black dragon, originating in Ryusenko the same as Tatsuki. She has questioned the Sousui's plans, going as far as to hide Haruka away from him so he cannot use her power to carry out his goals.

== Other characters ==
=== Sumimura family ===
Madarao (斑尾)
Voiced by: Takeharu Ōnishi (Japanese); Troy Baker (English)

A white demon dog that has served the Sumimura family since its founding, passed down to them by the founder, Tokimori Hazama. Madarao is able to detect ayakashi with his amazing sense of smell, which he often brags is far better than Hakubi's. However, no matter how fast he locates an ayakashi, Yoshimori could never dispatch them fast enough, a fact Madarao often bemoans. Madarao is around 500 years old, and prior to his existence as a demon, was a wild dog known as Ginro (銀露), and was at one time friends with Kōya. He wears a 'collar', made of spirit beads and seals strung together with a nenshi, that seals away his true demon form. When not assisting Yoshimori, he resides inside a special stone covered with glyphs, which is humorously located inside a wooden doghouse. When unsealed, Madarao become very large and uses powerful poisons and illusions. Madarao seems to have an unrequited crush on Tokimori Hazama; apparently, the reason he had followed him was because he fell in love with him at first sight. Throughout his service to the Sumimura family, Madarao had refused to acknowledge anybody as his real master other than Tokimori Hazama; however, after the battle with Kōya, Madarao begins to view Yoshimori as his master.

Shimano (縞野)

A golden Nekomata (two-tailed demon cat) that has served the Sumimura family. Shimano resides at the bottom of a covered well on the Sumimura family property. The bottom of the well houses a special training room, where Shimano has trained various legitimate successors of the Sumimura family in the art of "Musou." Musou is a mental state in which the user becomes completely devoid of emotion and enters a state of pure focus. Shimano's training routine is considerably brutal, as he uses the ends of his tails to administer powerful electric shocks to Yoshimori's head when he loses focus and his mind strays. He does, however, refer to Yoshimori as "master" or "22nd," and has acknowledged that he possesses a power that may some day exceed all legitimate successors that have come before him. He refers to Yoshimori as a sympathizer for Karasumori. Shimano has served the family for 500 years, since the foundation of Kekkaishi. It is revealed in chapter 313 that Shimano was captured by Tokimori 400 years ago, telling him to lure ayakashi to the Karasumori site daily so that Tokimori would have a constant supply of work to do for the lord.

Shiguma (しぐま)

Yoshimori's landlord, who appears in chapter 266. He originally appears as a white and black striped box only to change shape into a tangible goblin, human-like creature. Shiguma transforms into several different creatures or beings as Yoshimori progressively uses more strength. He goes from a snake-like creature with a humanistic face, all the way to a bird-like creature. The latter form is the highest form that he's used when Yoshimori has displayed his pinnacle of strength. It seems Shiguma's shape shifting knows no bounds as he also has the capabilities to shift himself into a small ball that can sit upon Chūshinmaru's shoulder. Shiguma also represents Yoshimori's subconscious, as he tells Yoshimori information that Yoshimori does not consciously know, while explaining that Yoshimori's subconscious has this information. Shiguma acts as an aid in battle to Yoshimori, as well as an amplifier of his strength.

Shigemori Sumimura (墨村 繁守, Sumimura Shigemori)
Voiced by: Yōhei Tadano (Japanese), David Lodge, Patrick Seitz (young) (English)

The grandfather of Yoshimori and the 21st head of the Sumimura family. Shigemori is a very hot-headed man and who often battles it out with the Yukimura Tokiko next door about the subject of the true successor. This has ranged from insults to battles conducted in midair. He also enjoys hitting Yoshimori on the head with his Legitimate Successor's Chop when he deems Yoshimori to be lazy and not hardworking enough to compete with the Yukimuras. Under Shigemori's blustery façade, he seems to care a lot about his family and Tokiko's well-being. One bone of contention with him was that Masamori had managed to enter the Shadow Organization, whom he heavily distrusts and dislikes. However, he had apparently given up trying to dissuade Masamori from continuing on working in the Shadow Organization, telling Masamori that that would be his own way of protecting Karasumori. It is alluded to that Shigemori is a highly skilled Kekkaishi. Masamori, a highly skilled Kekkaishi in his own right had informed Shigemori that he was nowhere near his level when Shigemori had complimented him. In the anime, during Kokuboro's first wave of attack, Shigemori was portrayed drawing up an enormous Kekkai around the house and creating shikigami even after dispatching Shion's lackeys without any signs of exhaustion; and also made a kekkai strong enough to block the nine tail demon fox princess's initial personal attack on Karasumori.

Masamori Sumimura (墨村正守, Sumimura Masamori)
Voiced by: Atsushi Miyauchi (Japanese); Patrick Seitz (English)

The oldest son of the Sumimuras. Although he is the oldest of the three brothers, Masamori was not chosen as the heir, which had always been a source of mystery to him and Yoshimori, the latter stating many times that in terms of skill and power, Masamori should have taken the position of heir. He is 21, though he looks much older. Masamori is the leader of Night Troop, as well as the 7th seat of the board of the Shadow Organization, in which he had struck up a highly uneasy and unpleasant relationship with Ogi Ichirou, the 8th seat, whom clearly despises and hates him. He is a very skilled Kekkaishi; mastering highest defense technique, mastering difficult techniques and able to activate Zekkai. However, one noticeable difference about Masamori's Zekkai and Yoshimori's Zekkai was that Masamori was only able to destroy with it. He is not able to create his Zekkai in such a way that he can protect the people in it other than himself. Some characters had noted that this was probably the reason why Masamori was not picked as the legitimate successor. Masamori is apparently a manipulative creature, he had struck deals before with Matsuda Heisuke in staging his fake death and manipulating Kasuga Yomi to enter Karasumori and later making use of her as an informant. Currently, it is not sure what his true aims are. While he does not like the members of the Shadow Organization's Council or what they do, he still works with them to preserve the organization, even while plotting how to reform the Shadow Organization to his own liking. The recent relations with Ogi mark Masamori's first real outward displays of anger, as Ogi's actions have resulted in the deaths of many of his subordinates, including Gen Shishio. After Ogi is found dead he focuses on finding truth behind the Shadow Organization killings, even resurrecting Koya and confronting Yumeji. Since Yumeji's death he has been trying to figure out how to stop the Sousui. He has developed a partnership with Meian to investigate any clues that might give them information on the Sousui's identity and his weaknesses. He even went as far as resurrecting Mudou's spirit for information on the Omi brothers. He is the only one of the remaining seats of the Shadow Organization's council not to be taken over by the Sousui's mind control, leaving him feeling useless and ineffectual, as his power only allowed him to save himself and not others. He later tries to recruit others to help him battle the Sousui not knowing that a group was already in place to do so. The group consists of Shiromi Kagen, Tatsuki, Kidoin Nura, and Shichirou Ougi. Masamori is the most important member of the group as it was revealed to them by Saki, a member of the Serpent's Eye, that he was the one who was going to kill the Sousui.

Kurohime (黒姫)

Masamori's landlord, a giant black koi fish who swims through the ground and sky as if it was water and read waves that Masamori spreads to detect objects.

Toshimori Sumimura (墨村 利守, Sumimura Toshimori)
Voiced by: Miyuki Kawashō (Japanese); Dorothy Elias-Fahn (English)

The youngest of the Sumimura brothers. Toshimori is a fairly serious individual despite his youth, often displaying maturity and insight beyond his years. He is able to create Kekkai, but his power is limited and he has not seriously pursued Kekkaishi training. However, he is still called upon to defend his home alongside his father in times of emergency.

Shichirou Ougi states that Hiura was sent to Karasumori to kidnap a kekkaishi; Toshimori was likely to be his target, since he is the weakest kekkaishi in both the Sumimura and Yukimura households.

Sumiko Sumimura (墨村 守美子, Sumimura Sumiko)
Voiced by: Keiko Kanno (Japanese); Dorothy Elias-Fahn (English)

Yoshimori's mother. She can use the Hazama-ryū Kekkai technique, but is not a legitimate successor. Very rarely seen in the manga and anime. She is an extremely powerful Kekkaishi and spends so much of her time traveling that she rarely returns home to her family. In truth, she left her home to find a land to seal the lord of Karasumori. On her first mission for the Shadow Organization she killed the god she was assigned to calm down, claiming its child told her to kill it. She was able to easily injure and subdue a god-class dragon as shown in Chapters 152 and 153 of the manga. She, along with Masamori, was the initial suspect in the shin'yūchi huntings, as she was seen at a number of the locations that had been hunted. It has been recently revealed by Tokimori that Sumiko had discovered the sealed castle under Karasumori and has been helping Tokimori find a suitable place to seal the Lord. That is the reason why she has been seen at so many of the shin'yūchi; she had been researching their suitability. Sumiko abruptly returned home under mysterious circumstances. When pressed on her intentions, she revealed her intention to take the being locked under Karasumori and seal him away in a more secure location. She further shocks her family by planning to take Yoshimori with her, because he is the only one compatible with the being under Karasumori. Tokimori coerces Yoshimori's continued help sealing the Lord, after the latter learns the truth about the Karasumori site and all the horrible things that have happened there, by telling him that though Sumiko doesn't have the required power to seal the Lord, she will do it alone if Yoshimori won't help them. Tokimori states her motivations behind sealing the Lord are not to help him, but for her children's sakes so that they will no longer be tied to the land. Sumiko created a shikigami which possesses 1/7 of her powers; it has shown itself to be more powerful than Yoshimori, and as such, it could be inferred that the real Sumiko's power is over seven times greater than his. While her shikigami helps Yoshimori and Tokimori harness and refine Yoshimori's abilities, the real Sumiko is in a secret passage under Oumi Nichinaga's castle preparing for sealing Chūshinmaru. At the end of the series, she finally seals herself within the new barrier for Chūshinmaru, stating that it is the only thing she can do as a mother by ensuring that her family will not need to protect Karasumori anymore. Sumiko's cooking and sewing skills are notably lacking when compared to her husband, which is part of why she considers herself unfit to be a normal housewife and mother despite Yoshimori's protests.

Shuji Sumimura (墨村 修史, Sumimura Shūji)
Voiced by: Manabu Muraji (Japanese); Rob Blatt (English)

Yoshimori's father. He does not have the power to see spirits. Shuji uses special items when he needs to act as a Kekkaishi. He was formerly an assistant to Heisuke, but presumably left that behind in order to marry Sumiko. Shuji is the housekeeper of the Sumimura family, as he does nearly all of the cooking and most of the cleaning. He wears an apron at all times, and works out of the home as a struggling author.

=== Yukimura family ===
Hakubi (白尾)
Voiced by: Masanori Ishii (Japanese); Wally Wingert (English)

The Yukimura family's demon dog; he detects demons with his sense of smell. He is about 400 years old. He is constantly teasing Yoshimori. Hakubi also enjoys harassing Madarao about having to serve a master (Yoshimori) with such pathetic skills. He playfully flirts with Tokine and likes to call her "honey", and is a sucker for cute girls. In the original Japanese version, he has a habit of using European words and expressions, eventually causing Yoshimori to complain that if he's a Japanese dog, he shouldn't be using European words. He accompanied Tokimori Hazama while he was alive and died when Chūshinmaru's power went wild.

Tokiko Yukimura (雪村 時子, Yukimura Tokiko)
Voiced by: Mayumi Tanaka (Japanese); Barbara Goodson, Laura Bailey (young) (English)

The grandmother of Tokine. She is the 21st head of the Yukimura family. She is also the current strongest Kekkaishi in Karasumori. She can control space to a high degree, and proves herself superior to Yoshimori in both power and skill on several occasions. Notably, she is able to selectively destroy a target in a Kekkai without harming anything else within. Though she has maintained a strong dislike for the entire Sumimura family for years and generally demands that Tokine not associate with them at all, she has gradually become more tolerant toward them and is starting to see Yoshimori as a proper successor, though typically with plenty of input and criticism from her.

Mikeno (三毛野)

A calico Nekomata (two-tailed demon cat) that has served the Yukimura family for centuries. Mikeno is Shimano's counterpart. After Yoshimori begins training with Shimano, Mikeno requests Tokiko to send Tokine for intense training, under Mikeno's tutelage, in a place called the Surge Room. She teaches Tokine to use "Utsusemi," a technique that allows the user to absorb a being's energy and render further attacks ineffective.

Shizue Yukimura (雪村 静江, Yukimura Shizue)
Voiced by: Asako Dodo (Japanese); Stephanie Sheh (English)

Tokine's mother. Married into the family. She possesses the ability to kill a cockroach without letting its inside spill out.

Tokio Yukimura (雪村 時雄, Yukimura Tokio)
Voiced by: Etsuo Yokobori (Japanese); Kirk Thornton (English)

Tokine's father. He was not blessed with the sign of the legitimate successor, so his power was limited, but he kept a positive attitude nevertheless. Early in Tokine's childhood, Tokio was mortally wounded fighting a hypnotic Ayakashi at the Karasumori site, after which Sumiko brought him home. For some time, it was left ambiguous whether his final warning to Tokine not to let her guard down around 'them' referred to Ayakashi or the Sumimuras (and most specifically Sumiko, who did not seem concerned by the implication that she might have been involved in his death). Sumiko eventually stated that she had no interest in the feud between their families or in killing Tokio, and Tokine did not press the issue.

=== Shadow Organization ===
The Shadow Organization (裏会, Urakai) is an umbrella group organizing all ability users and those who fight ayakashi and other demons. It is run by an executive committee called the Council of Twelve (十二人会, Jūnininkai).

Hisaomi Yumeji (夢路 久臣, Yumeji Hisaomi)

The first seat in the Council of Twelve. Takes authority over everything in the Shadow Organization in order to harmonize the decision making process and protect the Shadow Organization following the apparent deaths of three of the council's members. He founded the Shadow Organization 400 years ago with his brother. To fight his brother, The Sousui, he is reforming the Shadow Organization, he's responsible for allowing the death of the other members and spreading of the shin'yūchi lands hunting. His real name is Tsukihisa Oumi and he is the real leader of those attacking Karasumori. After a confrontation with Masamori, he is seemingly killed by his brother's subordinate, Zero only to escape and instead transfer his consciousness to Zero but was killed by the founder shortly after his revelation. He, like his brother, has two powers, one the ability to manipulate plants, and the other is a psychic ability, with his psychic form being a spider-starfish. It is as yet unknown what began the rivalry between the brothers, but the Sousui has a deep hate for him, culminating in his eventual demise. As of chapter 304, it has been revealed that the Oumi brothers were able to live so long, because they would "hop" from body-to-body, thus no longer being "human". He stole the founder's memories and manipulated him, leading him to believe they were brothers. Due to continuous body transfers both Oumi brothers remember little of what is true about their past.

Nura Kidoin (鬼童院 ぬら, Kidōin Nura)

The second seat of the Council of Twelve. She did not attend the latest meeting of the Council of Twelve and thus escaped the Sousui's attack. Kidoin is a demon tamer and a pacifist with the most military power in the Shadow Organization. The sheer quantity of powerful demons she controls is immense, and they are said to have built her entire underground palace in three days. However, she is described by all to be kind and compassionate, yet somewhat distant to new acquaintances. Her power over demons renders them immune to the Sousui's powers. When her power invokes, she changes from an older woman to a much younger one. Tatsuki mentions that when the Shadow Organization is rebuilt she would be the perfect person to head the organization.

Tatsuki (竜姫)
Voiced by: Asako Dodo (Japanese); Dorothy Elias-Fahn (English)

The former third seat of the Council of Twelve, she resigned. As of Chapter 320, it would seem that she is in fact a shapeshifting dragon ayakashi of the first class. In that form, she goes by the name of Raijin (thunder god). She wields extremely powerful lightning in that form and is easily able to overwhelm Masamori's zekkai without using her full strength. Additionally, she has had previous history with Shichirou Ougi's father, who in his youth was her partner as Fūjin (wind god), and they'd go around causing ruckuses.

Meian (冥安)

The fourth seat of the Council of Twelve. He is one of only 5 remainders of Council of Twelve, who is currently fighting the Commander, the Sousui. As of Chapter 312 he is under the influence of the Sousui's mind control. He was leading the Council of Twelve against the Sousui before he fell under control. He seems to have knowledge of all sorts of forbidden techniques, including the ability to create a Kurokabuto, a black-helmed soldier with the ability to emanate an energy katana. However, the two Kurokabuto he created also are able to be controlled, setting them apart from others of their kind. Thus, they are remarked to be the strongest ayakashi. Yet, the Kurokabuto still fell before the Sousui's psychic powers, which were able to control even ayakashi.

Gaiji Kusaribe (腐部 骸次, Kusaribe Gaiji)

The fifth seat of the Council of Twelve. He is one of only 5 remainders of Council of Twelve, who is currently fighting the Commander, the Sousui. As of Chapter 312 he is under the influence of the Sousui's mind control. He is clad almost entirely in cloth wrapped around himself, almost like a mummy. He has the ability to raise the dead to do his bidding. However, he shows little mercy, even to his own the Shadow Organization members, preferring to kill them all. This is a view he shares with his colleagues on the council: Juho and Tsumugi Kazuchika

Kagen Shiromi (銀魅 霞玄, Shiromi Kagen)

The former sixth seat of the Council of Twelve, he was resigned. As of Chapter 320, he returned to take part in the commander court martial hearing.

Mudou (墨村 正守, Mudō)

The former seventh seat of the Council of Twelve and previously known as "The Immortal Mudou", Mudou held a brief position as a director. Claiming to be bored with the old, Mudou attacked the Urukai Training Facility, explaining to Masamori Sumimura that it was an opportunity to "play with the young." However, Mudou's true motive was to eliminate the Master of the Land, Tan'yū, a weak being with the ability to cast illusions. Tan'yū destroyed the world in which the Urukai Training Facility was on, killing Mudou in the process. His spirit has been resurrected by Masamori, so that the latter could gain information on the Sousui.

Ichiro Ogi (扇一郎, Ōgi Ichirō)
Voiced by: Daisuke Gōri (Japanese); JB Blanc (English)

The eighth seat of the Council of Twelve. Member of the Ogi clan, who are the wind masters. Ogi secretly conspired with Kokuboro, and Byaku in particular, to seize control of Karasumori's power. Masamori Sumimura has long suspected him of being a traitor and is working with Okuni to expose him. Ogi is physically very large, over twice the size of a normal human, and wears a hood that conceals his face at all times. When Masamori attempts to confront Ogi about his treachery, it is revealed that Ogi is actually six brothers who have the ability to merge physically and combine their powers. This explains Ogi's large size and immense power. When the Yagyou reach his hiding place and Masamori comes to face him, he is shown to have been killed, along with his other brothers (excluding Rokurou) by Shichirou Ogi, the legitimate successor to the Ogi family.

Okuni (奥久尼)

The ninth seat of the Council of Twelve. She serves as the organization's historian and record keeper. She also is a strong proponent of justice and order. She appears to be invincible and has the ability to create portals and pockets in space for moving great distances or storing various items. After Kokuboro was defeated, Okuni investigated the Karasumori site, to better understand why Ayakashi are drawn to the location. There she witnessed a powerful ayakashi attack Karasumori itself causing her to question whether the force below the site is just energy or possibly a living entity. Later, she confronts Ichirou Ogi and reveals that she knows he conspired with Kokuboro to seize control of Karasumori. Ogi attacks her with his wind, but she is unhurt and Okuni makes it clear that she intends to bring him to justice. She is apparently killed, or at least badly wounded, by an unknown assailant when one of her subordinates tries to reach her when a fire is started at the Shadow Organization Headquarters. She reappears as a spirit in chapter 264 to confirm her suspicions. She was killed by Zero. In chapter 273, she reveals to Masamori that Karasumori is not a spiritual land but an actual human being. The being possessed a massive 'spirit reservoir' and had the potential to destroy the world, but was sealed underneath Karasumori. She also believes that the true purpose of the kekkaishi successors is not to prevent ayakashi from stealing Karasumori's power but to prevent the being sealed beneath from escaping. Before disappearing into the afterlife, she reveals one final revelation, Yoshimori possesses the same massive 'spirit reservoir' and potential as the being sealed under Karasumori, and that the being is trying to share its power with Yoshimori.

Kazuchika Tsumugi (紡岐 一親, Tsumugi Kazuchika)

The tenth seat of the Council of Twelve. She is one of only 5 remainders of Council of Twelve, who is currently fighting the Commander, the Sousui. As of Chapter 312 she is under the influence of the Sousui's mind control. Her entire face is obscured with thick hair, and she has the power to bring inanimate objects, up to and including houses, alive to do her bidding.

Kihei Konozuka (狐ノ塚 奇平, Konozuka Kihei)

The eleventh seat of the Council of Twelve. He was killed by Shichirou Ogi.

Juho (咒宝, Juh)

The twelfth seat of the Council of Twelve. He is one of only five remainders of Council of Twelve, who is currently fighting the Commander, the Sousui. As of Chapter 312 he is under the influence of the Sousui's mind control. As he demonstrated during the Sousui's takeover of the Shadow Organization headquarters, he has the ability to manipulate the energy from "dragon-holes" in the ground, thus drawing energy from the land and firing it in devastating lances/pillars up into the air from these "dragon-holes". Due to that, the other two Council members present remarked that it was best to leave the "heavy stuff" to Juho, commenting on the strength of his spell. He also has the ability to animate shikigami-like beings to act as an army.

Saki (サキ)

A member of Serpent's eye, a group that can see the future within the Shadow Organization. She appeared using the artificial ayakashi to gather information and they went berserk, as repentance she cut her hair, a miko's source of power. She delivered her master's message about Karasumori being trapped in chaos. After her master killed herself she left the group and confronted the group to tell them a horrible future for the Shadow Organization will begin; she then secluded herself to see if she can see a change in the future. Premonitions cut down the users and those who see its life span.

==== Night Troop ====
The Night Troop (夜行, Yagyō) is a troop of ability users under the Shadow Organization. It was created and run by Masamori Sumimura, and includes many young ability users still in training.

Atora Hanashima (花島 亜十羅, Hanashima Atora)
Voiced by: Urara Takano (Japanese); Erin Fitzgerald (English)

An energetic fighter who specializes in taming monsters and using them in combat. She was assigned to be Gen Shishio's trainer when he joined the Night Troop, primarily due to her skill for handling "wild things". She develops a lopsided relationship with Gen, becoming more of an 'overbearing, older sister' to him. Gen's death devastates Atora, who breaks down during his memorial service. Later, when the Night Troop arrive to help protect Karasumori, Atora stays in Gen's old apartment instead of Yoshimori's house.

Raizo (雷蔵, Raizō)
Voiced by: Yasuhiro Takato

Atora's favorite "pet" who is good friends with Gen. He has the appearance of a large white, bear-like monster, and has the power to create and control lightning.

Kyoichi Hiba (翡葉 京一, Hiba Kyōichi)
Voiced by: Go Inoue (Japanese); Sam Riegel (English)

A member of the Night Troop that first appears in the 8th volume. He injects poison into Gen (when he tries to fully transform) to calm him down and to make him transform back into his human form. He is an ayakashi majiri, whose powers demonstrate a plant-like transformation, quite like that of Aihi's, from Kokubourou. He also hated Gen.

Yomi Kasuga (春日 夜未, Kasuga Yomi)
Voiced by: Houko Kuwashima (Japanese); Colleen O'Shaughnessey (English)

A demon-user that once tried to take over the Karasumori site to make Yoki, her demon, stronger. When she was young she was teased by others who said she should have chosen a better demon. She now works for Masamori as an informant. Yomi originally shown contempt and disdain for Tokine and her father Tokio, but after seeing a small fragment of Yoki's horn regenerate Yoki into a small version of himself, Yomi regrets her actions toward the Yukimura and Sumimura families. Yomi would've faced execution for her treachery had Masamori Sumimura not intervened and assured the Shadow Organization it wouldn't be repeated. Yomi is still important within the Night Troops.

Mukade (蜈蚣)
Voiced by: Jou Watanabe (Japanese); Benjamin Diskin (English)

Has the power to create giant black bug-type transportation system. It carried many people to Kokuboro to rescue Yoshimori and Sen. Also carried Shigemori and Shuji to Heisuke Matsudo's home once.

Hakudo (白道, Hakudō)
Voiced by: Shouto Kashii (Japanese); Troy Baker (English)

Has the ability of "Moon Blade", called Geppa.

Odo (黄道, Ōdō)
Voiced by: Tōru Nara (Japanese); JB Blanc (English)

Has the ability of "Sun Flare Ball".

Miki Hatori (刃鳥 美希, Hatori Miki)
Voiced by: Kazuki Murayama (Japanese); Michelle Ruff (English)

Vice Chief of the Night Troop. Masamori's confidant. Her ability "Black Wing" can shoot countless black pinnate from her left arm's tattoo.

Shu Akitsu (秋津 秀, Akitsu Shū)
Voiced by: Yōichi Masukawa (Japanese); Michael Sinterniklaas (English)

Sen's friend that can grow wings. He is also shown to have excellent hearing which aids him when he transfers from the combat division of the Yagyou to the intelligence division. In the most recent chapters, Shu and his friend Sen have been assigned to investigate Karasumori's Kekkaishi. His true form is that of a Vampire who plays with his female victims when he loses control.

Sen Kagemiya (影宮 閃, Kagemiya Sen)
Voiced by: Ryōhei Kimura (Japanese); Steve Staley (English)

When Yoshimori is chasing after Kaguro (actually it is Shion, who is dressed up as Kaguro) during the Kokuboro assault on Karasumori site, he follows Yoshimori secretly but winds up getting caught by the Kokuboro members. He is rescued by Yoshimori and helps (albeit briefly) in the following fight against Kaguro. It is implied that he was jealous of how strong Gen was, since he states that in battle he was always staring at Gen's back. He, Shu, and Dai as the weakest of the combat division were always in back relegated to support. He sees Yoshimori in kind of the same light, as Yoshimori is now the one who steps to the front in battle to protect him when it is needed. In the latest manga chapters, he is instructed by Masamori to observe the ones chosen by Karasumori. In order to do this, he and fellow intelligence division member Shū (who transferred from the combat division with Sen), are enrolled in the same school as Yoshimori and Tokine. He has gotten close with Yoshimori, developing a kind of friendship with him and becoming a close confidante, but he is uneasy getting closer to Yoshimori knowing that he is spying on him. He doesn't trust Hiura when he shows up, knowing that Hiura was involved somehow in the shin'yūchi huntings but seemed to accept him somewhat after Hiura was injured by Shichirou Ougi. It has been revealed that Sen possesses the ability to read into the minds of people although, so far, he can only see their outermost thoughts. He hates being reminded that he has feminine looks and is afraid of bugs. Since Yoshimori has taken the lord from Karasumori and the school has collapsed and is being rebuilt, he and Shu have rejoined Night Troop at their main headquarters.

Dai Yaegashi (八重樫 大, Yaegishi Dai)

Another one of Sen's friends. Is able to make duplicates of himself to confuse opponents.

Hakota (箱田)
Voiced by: Noboru Yamaguchi (Japanese); Vic Mignogna (English)

Has abilities to see far objects. He was the first one to see Yoshimori and Sen in the odd "zekkai" type thing.

Misao (操)
Voiced by: Saki Fujita (Japanese); Dorothy Elias-Fahn (English)

Has the power to make objects come to life, such as rope and stuffed animals. This ability helps her and Akira escape the "box."

Higurashi (蜩)

Also has the ability to grow wings. He once had Hatori ride him to defeat ayakashi.

Shinya Makio (巻緒 慎也, Makio Shin'ya)
Voiced by: Mitsutaka Itakura (Japanese); Sam Riegel (English)

Head of the combat division of Night Troop. Along with Takemitsu and Todoroki, he is sent to Karasumori, in part to support Yoshimori and Tokine in protecting it from being hunted by the people behind the shin'yūchi huntings, but mostly to prevent the Shadow Organization headquarters from interfering with the kekkaishi in charge of protecting Karasumori. According to Sen, he is reliable and good at giving accurate commands. He's a Jiugenka power-user who uses shadows.

Fumiya Somegi (染木 文弥, Somegi Fumiya)

Head of the Majinai division within Night Troop. He is sent to Karasumori to combat the majinai that is left in Karasumori by Michiru and Kakeru after their first visit to Karasumori to mark it for hunting. He specializes in charm design and is the one who created the tattoos seen on Gen and Miki Hatori to suppress their ayakashi sides. Using Makio, Takemitsu, Todoroki, Ito Orihara and Shegmori Sumimura as power sources, he is the one responsible for breaking the majinai Kakeru was going to use to annihilate the town in which Karasumori was located.

Ito Orihara (織原 絲, Orihara Ito)

Part of the Night Troop Majinai division. She works with Fumiya Somegi and is a charm neutralizing specialist. She is a very shy person only seen speaking by whispering into Fumiya's ears.

=== Karasumori Academy ===
Hiromu Tabata (田端 ヒロム, Tabata Hiromu)
Voiced by: Atsushi Abe (Japanese); Bryce Papenbrook (English)

A friend of Yoshimori, in the same grade but a different classroom. He is known as the "Information Wizard" because he enjoys collecting information about people.

Tomonori Ichigaya (市ヶ谷 友則, Ichigaya Tomonori)
Voiced by: Kosuke Toriumi (Japanese); Darrel Guilbeau (English)

Yoshimori's friend and classmate. He tends to be reserved and sensible.

Yurina Kanda (神田 百合奈, Kanda Yurina)
Voiced by: Aya Hirano (Japanese); Colleen O'Shaughnessey (English)

Yoshimori's classmate. She can see ayakashi and various other spirits, and frequently consults Yoshimori when she sees one. It is implied that she may have a crush on Yoshimori. This is also suspected by her friends, who constantly tease her about it.

Kyoko (キョーコ, Kyōko)
Voiced by: Saori Seto (Japanese); Stephanie Sheh (English)

Yurina's friend and classmate. Believes Yurina has a crush on Yoshimori, and likes to tease her about it.

Ayano (アヤノ)
Voiced by: Ryoka Yuzuki (Japanese); Wendee Lee (English)

Yurina's friend and classmate. Believes Yurina has a crush on Yoshimori, and likes to tease her to go for him.

Madoka (円)

Tokine's friend and classmate. She thinks Yoshimori is "cute" and encourages Tokine to improve her relationship with him.

Tatsumi Mino (三能 たつみ, Minō Tatsumi)
Voiced by: Toru Ohkawa (Japanese); Steve Staley (English)

Counselor at Karasumori Academy, who was once controlled by an ayakashi parasite called Kugutsuchu. He has supernatural powers which are manifested as three snakes named Josephine, Simone, and Roxanne. While he acts very seductive and sinister when possessed, the true Mino is very kind, conscientious, mildly perverted, devoted to teaching, and goofy. Whether or not this three snakes are his landlord is unknown.

Kirara Kawakami (川上 雲母, Kawakami Kirara)
Voiced by: Yukana Nogami (Japanese); Stephanie Sheh (English)

In the anime only, Tokine's friend. She is an enemy of Mao.

Mao Shinohara (篠原 真桜, Shinohara Mao)
Voiced by: Saori Yumiba (Japanese); Dorothy Elias-Fahn (English)

In the anime only, Tokine's bossy classmate. Mao is jealous of Tokine.

Julia Roppongi (六本木 樹理亜, Roppongi Juria)

A student in high school class 1-D, who first appears in volume 16 of manga. She is nicknamed as "the Black Widow" and "Puppet Master." She has a brief crush on Yoshimori after he saves her from falling from the roof of the school.

Aoi Shinagawa (品川 葵, Shinagawa Aoi)
Voiced by: Ryoko Shiraishi (Japanese); Carrie Savage (English)

A friend of Yuri that saw Gen jumping from rooftop to rooftop, and has even since that moment has had a crush on him. Also has an abandoned puppy who was fed by Gen, which was also named Gen by Aoi.

=== Ayakashi and spirits ===
Koya (鋼夜, Kōya)
Voiced by: Masashi Ebara (Japanese); Paul St. Peter (English)

A wild dog who was a friend of Madarao (then known as "Ginro") back when they lived on their mountain together. The mountain was taken over by humans during the Sengoku period and the two dogs were driven out, after which they perished. He was killed by samurai and became a demon dog along with Madarao, but became twisted by his hatred of humans. Madarao defeated him in the third volume of the manga and the twelfth episode of the TV series. Yoshimori asked his brother to return Koya's remains to the mountain he used to live on. Recently, it was revealed he was forcefully brought back to life by Masamori and serves him in exchange from Masamori promising to return the mountain he and Madarao used to live on back to him. He is black with a white chest, and ruthlessly strong.

Lord Uro (ウロ様, Urō-sama)
Voiced by: Chafurin (Japanese); Michael Sorich (English)

A god that loves doughnuts. Long ago, Tokimori begged him to give the middle of the "forest" to him, and in return Tokimori promised him a new place to sleep.

Mamezo (豆蔵, Mamezō)
Voiced by: Shirō Saitō (Japanese); Spike Spencer (English)

Lord Uro's servant and spokesperson. Mamezo resembles a Jiminy-cricket-like bug with a leaf growing out of his head.

Shido (紫堂, Shidō)

A crow servant of a Tengu land god. When he changes to a human form, he looks oddly handsome compared to his lord. (Who looks like a dirty old man.) In return for the help Yoshimori gave him, he gave him a feather that calls crows, and allows Yoshimori to understand them.

Yumigane (弓鉄, Iron Bow)
Voiced by: Asuka Tanii (Little Girl), Shiku Nishimae (Transformed) (Japanese); Michelle Ruff (Little Girl), Kirk Thornton (Transformed) (English)

Can disguise themselves as cute, harmless-looking creature until they cannot hide their hideousness. Badly injured Tokine.

Honetaro (骨太郎, Honetarō)
Voiced by: Satsuki Tsutsumi (Japanese); Cindy Robinson (English)

Kōya's follower. He is supposedly the revised version of Momotarō (hinted at by his costume and name).

Uhosuke (ウホ助)
Voiced by: Hideki Tanaka (Japanese); Patrick Seitz (English)

Kōya's follower. He is supposedly the revised version of the monkey in Momotarō.

Nagao (長尾)
Voiced by: Noboru Yamaguchi

Kōya's follower. He is supposedly the revised version of the green pheasant in Momotarō.

Shirahago (白羽児, White Feather Kids)
Voiced by: Kujira (Hizuki), Keiji Himeno (Mizuki), Kimiko Saito (Fuzuki) (Japanese); Mary Elizabeth McGlynn (English)

Servants of the Ayakashi in the same human skin as Kaguro. They have overly large feet. Can turn into hundreds of feathers to escape attacks. Together, they can turn into a gigantic owl-looking Ayakashi.

=== Others ===
Chūshinmaru (宙心丸)
He has the appearance and voice of a young child. He is agile and playful. He is the Lord of Karasumori. He asked Yoshimori to call him lord and also tried to order Tokine around when they met him. Chūshinmaru is currently kept in a charm around Yoshimori's neck, as it is thought to be the safest place for him to be. Chūshinmaru aids Yoshimori in battle by giving Yoshimori his strength. He has a vast spiritual reservoir that is capable of destroying the world. It has been posited by Yoshimori and confirmed by Tokimori that Chūshinmaru is Tokimori Hazama's son, though it appears that Chūshinmaru doesn't know that Tokimori is his father. Tokimori states that just by existing Chūshinmaru drains the life away from any living thing around him. This is seen the first time the reader is introduced to the child. Tsukikage's ghost, Chūshinmaru's mother and Tokimori's lover, led Tokimori back to the Karasumori castle, where Tokimori found everyone dead except Chūshinmaru. When Chūshinmaru is first seen as an infant, he is a mass of black smoke or tendrils; only at the end of chapter 314 does his face begin to become visible. Tsukikage states he is not always in that form, and he will usually smile when he is happy.
Tokimori Hazama (間 時守)
Voiced by: Jin Yamanoi (Japanese); Travis Willingham (English)
The founder of the Hazama-ryu Kekkai Technique. His disciples were the first heads of the Sumimura and Yukimura families. He is a powerful Kekkaishi and is able to use zekkai. Hazama was also Madarao's former master. Later in the manga series, Madarao smelled a familiar scent and he showed up to the astonishment of both Yoshimori and Madarao. Hazama is now actively training Yoshimori to refine his abilities as well as training him to master the shinkai technique. He had the power to force an ayakashi within his territory to follow him and he ended up collecting a wide assortment.
He has a personal acquaintance with both Oumi brothers and he was present during the founding of the Shadow Organization. He is not particularly trustworthy and he is keeping secrets from Yoshimori. As of Chapter 312 it has been confirmed by Tokimori that he is Chūshinmaru's father, though Chūshinmaru is unaware of this and Tokimori states that he is unqualified to be a parent. Tokimori states that he always knew he was different from others. He was an orphan because of his powers but found ways to be useful because of them. He was outcast and reviled as a monster. Upset that no one would acknowledge his power he became bitter and angry. Tsukikage, the princess of Karasumori, tells him the air around him is always stagnant from his anger and hatred and that it looked like he was wearing heavy drooping robes that were pulling him down. However, she told him that he still had a chance to save himself from the darkness. He initially thinks about killing her, but changes his mind, eventually falling in love with her. He was thrown out of Karasumori after it was found that he had impregnated Tsukikage and tried to avenge himself on the world by casting a spell that would ensure that his and Tsukikage's child would not only become lord of Karasumori, but also that he would be extremely powerful. The spell worked but it cost Tsukikage and everyone else living in Karasumori except Chūshinmaru their lives. Tokimori has stated that he cannot forgive himself for what he had done. For a while Tsukikage haunted Tokimori, coming to him but never saying anything until one night she led him toward the castle where he discovered everyone except Chūshinmaru dead-thus disproving the history that Sumimura's and Yukimura's were taught, as Chūshinmaru (technically speaking it was Tokimori's fault) is the reason everyone at Karasumori died, not ayakashi. Tsukikage leaves them then, while Tokimori begs her to stay with them. Afterwards he, the child, and all the ayakashi he'd collected left Karasumori.
Tsukikage (月影)
The princess of Karasumori, daughter of the Lord of the castle. She becomes Tokimori's lover and eventually gives birth to Chūshinmaru. She dies giving birth to him. After her death she visits Tokimori as a ghost for a while until she eventually leads Tokimori back toward the castle so that he can take care of their child as everyone else at the castle has died. She states that Tokimori is the only one who can hold him.
While she lived, she had the most spiritual sensitivity of anyone in the castle at Karasumori and later Tokimori realizes that she was the one calling the ayakashi to the castle, though her father was unaware of this and she asked Tokimori to keep that from him. She was sickly so could not see the world so called for the ayakashi because she enjoyed seeing strange things. She also had the power to see people's emotions as shapes. Accurately pinpointing that Tokimori's heart was black but that he had a chance to turn it white again. She is truly happy to have met Tokimori, stating that because of him she was able to know a part of the world.
Haruka (遥)
A girl with a vast spiritual reservoir being used by the Sousui. Much like Chūshinmaru with Yoshimori, Haruka lends the Sousui her power in order to amplify his psionic attacks when he comes to take over Arashizaki shrine. She looks up to the Sousui like a big brother and he attacks a member of the Ougi clan for making her cry, calling her his sacred treasure. Near the end of the series, Mahora-sama's accompanying guide takes the spiritual power from her.
Yumeko Hananokoji (花乃小 路夢子, Hananokoji Yumeko)
Voiced by: Masako Nozawa (Japanese); Mona Marshall (English)
Also known as "Mother-san". Helps lost souls rest in peace.
Masahiko Tsukijigaoka (月地ヶ岡 真彦, Tsukijigaoka Masahiko)
Voiced by: Kōichi Tōchika (Japanese); Tom Fahn (English)
Patissier ghost whose last word was "cabbage". Helped Yoshimori with his castle cakes, while hanging around for a while. Eventually, he comes to terms with his brother and manages to pass on.
Toshihiko Tsukijigaoka (月地ヶ岡 俊彦, Tsukijigaoka Toshihiko)
Voiced by: Akira Ishida (Japanese); Brian Palermo (English)
Younger brother of Masahiko Tsukijigaoka. Owner of the Tsukijigoaka Food Company. Reason why Masahiko was unable to pass on was because he was afraid Toshihiko resented him.
Heisuke Matsudo (松戸 平介, Matsudo Heisuke)
Voiced by: Nachi Nozawa (Japanese); Michael McConnohie (English)
Age 70. An associate of Yoshimori's grandfather. An expert of ayakashi and was the first to discover the secrets behind the human skin that Aihi had created. He had a love interest in a woman called Risa Kagami, who was unfortunately married to Byaku. He grew vengeful when Kagami died and swore to exact revenge on Byaku for her death. He is bound to a contract with a demon that will do his bidding in exchange for his soul. He also seems to possess a number of magical artifacts, enough to fight without Kagami and to fake his death. After wandering randomly destroying the castle, Heisuke finds main target Byaku. After the big battle where Byaku was assumed to be dead he started to feel tired and walks out of the castle with Kagami back to his home.
Kagami (加賀見)
Voiced by: Asako Dodo (Japanese); Dorothy Elias-Fahn (English)
A shape-shifting demon that bound a contract with Heisuke Matsudo. Takes the form of Risa Kagami and acts charming and elegant. Does Heisuke's bidding in return for his soul when he dies.
Ryo Shishio (志々尾 涼, Shishio Ryō)
Voiced by: Arisa Ogasawara (Japanese); Tara Platt (English)
Older sister of Gen Shishio. Age 20. Was once nearly killed by Gen when he was in his ayakashi form. Despite this, she still cares for her brother and longs for him to find happiness. She hates Masamori and refuses to accept his apologies when he comes to pay his respect to Gen's family after his death. In Ryo's eyes, Masamori, as the leader of the Night Troop, sent Gen to his death. She does, however, accept Yoshimori's condolences after learning that Yoshi was Gen's friend and that he found happiness before dying.
Risa Kagami (加賀見 リサ, Kagami Risa)
Voiced by: Youko Honna (Japanese); Dorothy Elias-Fahn (English)
Shiranuma's (Byaku's) former wife. She received anything she wanted from him. Died while trying to gain eternal beauty through Byaku's experiments.
Kimiya Hachioji (八王子 君也, Hachiōji Kimiya)
Voiced by: Daisuke Hirakawa (Japanese); Sam Riegel (English)
Known as the "Prince of Central East High". Was once controlled by a brain ayakashi called No Otoko.
Takeshi Kongo (金剛 毅, Kongō Takeshi)
17 years old fūmashi (exorcist) who is chasing after a demon called Jaren, who killed his master. He uses a pack full of large nails which can be charged as weapons. His appearance so far was short, but Yoshimori and Takeshi have promised to meet again.

== See also ==
- List of Kekkaishi chapters
- List of Kekkaishi episodes
