= List of Frieren chapters =

Frieren: Beyond Journey's End is a Japanese manga series written by Kanehito Yamada and illustrated by Tsukasa Abe. It has been serialized in Shogakukan's shōnen manga magazine Weekly Shōnen Sunday since April 2020, with its chapters collected in 15 tankōbon volumes as of December 2025. The series is licensed for English release in North America by Viz Media, while in Singapore by Shogakukan Asia.

== Volumes ==
No.	Original release date	Original ISBN	English release date	English ISBN
1	August 18, 2020	978-4-09-850180-9	November 9, 2021	978-1-9747-2576-2
1. "The Journey's End" (冒険の終わり, Bōken no Owari); 2. "The Priest's Lie" (僧侶の嘘, Sōryo no Uso); 3. "Blue-Moon Weed" (蒼月草, Sōgetsu Sō); 4. "The Mage's Secret" (魔法使いの隠し事, Mahōtsukai no Kakushigoto); 5. "Killing Magic" (人を殺す魔法, Hito o Korosu Mahō); 6. "New Year's Festival" (新年祭, Shinnen-sai); 7. "The Land Where Souls Rest" (魂の眠る地, Tamashii no Nemuru Chi)
After a 10-year long journey to defeat the Demon King and bring peace to the world, the elven mage Frieren parts ways with her companions, the hero Himmel, the dwarf warrior Eisen and the priest Heiter. 50 years later, Frieren reunites briefly with them before Himmel passes away from old age. During his funeral, Frieren realizes that she misses him and wanted to know him better. Some years later, Frieren pays a visit to an elderly Heiter and takes his adopted daughter, a war orphan called Fern as her apprentice. A few years after Heiter's death, Frieren learns from a grimoire left by her late teacher, the Great Sage Flamme about the resting place of souls, located inside the Demon King's castle, and begins a new journey with Fern intending to see Himmel again to bid the hero a fitting farewell and express her feelings.
2	October 16, 2020	978-4-09-850181-6	January 11, 2022	978-1-9747-2723-0
8. "One One-Hundredth" (百分の一, Hyakubun no Ichi); 9. "Phantoms of the Dead" (死者の幻影, Shisha no Gen'ei); 10. "Solar Dragon" (紅鏡竜, Kōkyō Ryū); 11. "The Hero of the Village" (村の英雄, Mura no Eiyū); 12. "The Northern Checkpoint" (北方の関所, Hoppō no Sekisho); 13. "Liberation Festival" (解放祭, Kaihō-sai); 14. "Monsters That Speak" (言葉を話す魔物, Kotoba o Hanasu Mamono); 15. "Draht" (ドラート, Dorāto); 16. "The Murder of a Guard" (衛兵殺し, Eihei Goroshi); 17. "Frieren the Slayer" (葬送のフリーレン, Sōsō no Furīren)
Eisen refuses to join Frieren's new adventure, intending to spend his elderly days in peace but by his suggestion, she recruits his adopted son, a young warrior called Stark. The party then sets north to the Northern Plateau up to a city where the local lord, Graf Ganat, negotiates an armistice with some remnants of the Demon Lord's army, led by Lügner, a servant of "Aura the Guillotine", an old enemy of Frieren's. Certain that the demons are lying, Frieren attempts to attack Lügner and is arrested. Draht, one of Lügner's assistants, attempts to kill Frieren in her cell, but she kills him instead and escapes.
3	December 18, 2020	978-4-09-850285-1	March 8, 2022	978-1-9747-2724-7
18. "The Undead Army" (不死の軍勢, Fushi no Gunzei); 19. "Raid" (急襲, Kyūshū); 20. "Master's Technique" (師匠の技, Shishō no Waza); 21. "Coward" (卑怯者, Hikyōmono); 22. "The Scales of Obedience" (服従の天秤, Fukujū no Tenbin); 23. "A Victory and a Funeral" (勝利と弔い, Shōri to Tomurai); 24. "The Elves' Wish" (エルフの願望, Erufu no Ganbō); 25. "The Village of the Sword" (剣の里, Tsurugi no Sato); 26. "A Gift to a Warrior" (戦士への贈り物, Senshi e no Okurimono); 27. "A Priest from an Ordinary Village" (平凡な村の僧侶, Heibon na Mura no Sōryo)
Lügner reveals his true objective, which is to force Graf Ganat to dispel the magic barrier that protects the city, allowing Aura and her forces to invade. Ganat refuses and is rescued by Fern and Stark, who kill Lügner and his other assistant, Linie. Meanwhile, Frieren confronts Aura directly and defeats her by turning Aura's own submission magic against her, forcing the demon to kill herself. The party then continues their journey, but they discover that to gain entry into the Northern Lands, one of them must be promoted to first rank mage and set for the city of Äußerst to take the certification exam. On their way, they meet the priest Sein, whom Frieren invites to join them.
4	March 17, 2021	978-4-09-850490-9	May 17, 2022	978-1-9747-2725-4
28. "The Priest and His Regret" (僧侶と後悔, Sōryo to Kōkai); 29. "Ideal Adult" (理想の大人, Risō no Otona); 30. "Mirrored Lotus" (鏡蓮華, Kagami Renge); 31. "Chaos Flower" (混沌花, Konton Ka); 32. "The Orden Family" (オルデン家, Oruden-ke); 33. "Old Man Voll" (フォル爺, Foru-jii); 34. "Statues of Heroes" (英雄の像, Eiyū no Zō); 35. "A Reason to Begin the Journey" (旅立ちのきっかけ, Tabidachi no Kikkake); 36. "Emotional Support" (心の支え, Kokoro no Sasae); 37. "The First-Class Exam" (一級試験, Ikkyū Shiken)
Despite refusing at first, Sein accepts Frieren's offer and joins the party. The four travel together for a while until Sein obtains some clues about the whereabouts of an old friend of his, forcing Sein to depart alone in order to keep searching for him. Frieren and the others arrive at Äußerst where Frieren and Fern take part in the first rank mage certification exam held by the Northern Continental Magic Association, which is led by Serie, an ancient and powerful elf who is an old acquaintance of Frieren and Flamme's teacher.
5	July 16, 2021	978-4-09-850634-7	July 19, 2022	978-1-9747-3007-0
38. "Stille–Meteoric Iron Bird" (隕鉄鳥(シュティレ), Shutire); 39. "Commence Capture Strategy" (捕獲作戦始動, Hokaku Sakusen Shidō); 40. "A Spell to Capture a Bird" (鳥を捕まえる魔法, Tori o Tsukamaeru Mahō); 41. "Time for Resolve" (覚悟のための時間, Kakugo no Tame no Jikan); 42. "A Reason to Fight" (戦う理由, Tatakau Riyū); 43. "Privilege" (特権, Tokken); 44. "Recapture the Stille" (隕鉄鳥(シュティレ)奪還, Shutire Dakkan); 45. "Water-Manipulation Magic" (水を操る魔法, Mizu o Ayatsuru Mahō); 46. "An Even-Better Flavor" (もっと美味しい味, Motto Oishii Aji); 47. "Fern and Her Baked Sweets" (フェルンと焼き菓子, Ferun to Yaki Gashi)
In the first round of the examination, Frieren and Fern are assigned to different groups of three mages. Each group is tasked is to capture a Stille, a rare and cunning species of magical bird and prevent it from being stolen by other teams until the time ends. Both Frieren and Fern's teams capture a bird each and fight other teams to protect them, triumphing in the end.
6	November 18, 2021	978-4-09-850728-3; 978-4-09-943096-2 (LE)	October 18, 2022	978-1-9747-3400-9
48. "The Ruins of the King's Tomb" (零落の王墓, Reiraku no Ōbo); 49. "Dungeons and Magical Items" (迷宮(ダンジョン)と魔道具, Danjon to Madōgu); 50. "Spiegel–A Water-Mirror Demon" (水鏡の悪魔(シュピーゲル), Shupīgeru); 51. "Dungeon Battle" (迷宮(ダンジョン)戦闘, Danjon Sentō); 52. "Strategy Meeting" (作戦会議, Sakusen Kaigi); 53. "An Era of Humans" (人間の時代, Ningen no Jidai); 54. "A Spell That Slashes Almost Anything" (大体なんでも切る魔法(レイルザイデン), Reiruzaiden); 55. "The Second Exam Ends" (第二次試験終了, Dainiji Shiken Shūryō); 56. "Fern's Staff" (フェルンの杖, Ferun no Tsue); 57. "The Third Exam" (第三次試験, Daisanji Shiken)
In the second round of the examination, the mages who passed the previous round are tasked to conquer a dungeon which was never cleared before. Inside the dungeon, the mages are attacked by clones of themselves created by a demon who resides within the dungeon's deepest part. After a few mages are forced to retreat, the remaining ones including Frieren and Fern join forces to defeat their clones and destroy the demon, clearing the dungeon and passing the exam. Serie decides to hold the third and final round of the exam personally, selecting the candidates whom she deems fit for promotion. Serie rejects several candidates, including Frieren, whom she is at odds with, but is surprised when Fern notices the instability in Serie's mana, not only approving Fern but inviting the girl to be her apprentice, which she declines.
7	March 17, 2022	978-4-09-850876-1; 978-4-09-943104-4 (LE)	January 17, 2023	978-1-9747-3620-1
58. "Serie's Intuition" (ゼーリエの直感, Zērie no Chokkan); 59. "With a Little Help" (小さな人助け, Chiisana Hitodasuke); 60. "Departure and Farewell" (旅立ちと別れ, Tabidachi to Wakare); 61. "Magic-Nullifying Crystal" (封魔鉱, Fūmakō); 62. "Why I Set Out on This Journey" (旅立ちの理由, Tabidachi no Riyū); 63. "The Hero of the South" (南の勇者, Minami no Yūsha); 64. "The Demon with a Sword" (剣の魔族, Tsurugi no Mazoku); 65. "The Secret Hot Spring of the Etwas Mountains" (エトヴァス山の秘湯, Etovasu-san no Hitō); 66. "The Places She Would Like" (好きな場所, Suki na Basho); 67. "Peaceful Time" (穏やかな時間, Odayakana Jikan)
After the magic exam is concluded, the party continues their journey to the north, providing assistance to the locals when required.
8	June 17, 2022	978-4-09-851148-8; 978-4-09-943116-7 (LE)	June 20, 2023	978-1-9747-3860-1
68. "Northern Plateau" (北部高原, Hokubu Kōgen); 69. "Boshaft—The Emperor's Spirit" (皇帝酒(ボースハフト), Bōsuhafuto); 70. "The Norm Company" (ノルム商会, Norumu Shōkai); 71. "Subjugation Request" (討伐依頼, Tōbatsu Irai); 72. "The General" (将軍, Shōgun); 73. "Encounter Battle" (遭遇戦, Sōgūsen); 74. "Divine Revolte" (神技のレヴォルテ, Shingi no Revorute); 75. "Erilfrachte—The Spell to Dispel Fog" (霧を晴らす魔法(エリルフラーテ), Erirufurāte); 76. "Settling" (決着, Ketchaku); 77. "A Thunder of Dragons" (竜の群れ, Ryū no Mure)
The party reunites with fellow mages Genau and Methode whom they first met in the magic exam. The two are tasked to take down the Demon General Revolte which is terrorizing the region. Frieren and the others agree to help them, with Stark and Genau slaying Revolte together while Frieren and the others kill his subordinates. Meanwhile, Denken, an elderly mage who also passed the exam arrives at his homeland, the city of Weise, which was transmuted into gold by the last and strongest of the Demon King's seven sages, "Macht of El Dorado".
9	September 15, 2022	978-4-09-851260-7; 978-4-09-943119-8 (LE)	October 17, 2023	978-1-9747-4060-4
78. "Lake Korridor" (コリドーア湖, Koridōa-ko); 79. "The Great Tor Canyon" (トーア大渓谷, Tōa Daikeikoku); 80. "Holy Snow Crystals" (聖雪結晶, Seisetsu Kesshō); 81. "The Golden Land" (黄金郷, Ōgonkyō); 82. "Diagoldze—The Spell to Transmute All Creation into Gold" (万物を黄金に変える魔法(ディーアゴルゼ), Dīagoruze); 83. "The Stone Bracelet of Servitude" (支配の石環, Shihai no Sekikan); 84. "Daredevil" (命知らず, Inochi Shirazu); 85. "Malice" (悪意, Akui); 86. "Discussions" (話し合い, Hanashiai); 87. "Affection" (好意, Kōi)
By the Magic Association's request, Frieren's party reunite with Denken, who asks for their assistance in taking down Macht and returning Weise to normal. In the occasion, it is revealed that Macht is a demon who voluntarily served Glück, the lord of Weise and Denken's father-in-law until he decided to betray his master and cast a curse called "Diagoldze" that transmuted the entire city into gold before he is confined within the city's premises by a magic barrier erected by the association. Denken also reveals that he was Macht's apprentice and visits him frequently. Denken takes the party to meet Macht for a friendly talk and Frieren, who once fought Macht and was almost killed by the demon, concludes that they can't defeat him in their current condition. However, Denken reveals that one of the association mages tapped into Macht's memories and asks for Frieren's help in analyzing them in order to look for a way to counter Diagoldze and defeat him.
10	March 16, 2023	978-4-09-851771-8	February 20, 2024	978-1-9747-4361-2
88. "Solitär" (ソリテール, Soritēru); 89. "Guilt" (罪悪感, Zaiaku-kan); 90. "Glück" (グリュック, Guryukku); 91. "Front Stage" (表舞台, Omote Butai); 92. "The Demise of Weise" (ヴァイゼの終焉, Vaize no Shūen); 93. "Great Barrier" (大結界, Dai Kekkai); 94. "Analysis" (解析, Kaiseki); 95. "Nameless Great Demon" (無名の大魔族, Mumei no Daimazoku); 96. "Master and Apprentice" (師弟, Shitei); 97. "Observation" (観測, Kansoku)
Frieren and Denken learn through Macht's memories that the demon was eager to learn about human emotions, which led him to befriend Glück and become his subordinate, helping Glück to become ruler of Weise by assassinating his political rivals. Many years later, Glück is forced by the other citizens to equip Macht with an artifact to control him, the "Stone Bracelet of Servitude", commanding him to serve the citizens of Weise and never act with malice upon them. However as a demon, Macht has no concept of human malice, allowing him to betray Glück and turn the entire city and its inhabitants into gold despite bound by the bracelet. As Frieren researches a way to dispel Diagoldze, Solitär, another demon and Macht's associate, dispels the barrier, allowing him to escape and spread the effects of Diagoldze, turning Frieren and the others into gold as well, until Frieren finishes her analysis and restores her body.
11	September 15, 2023	978-4-09-852769-4	September 10, 2024	978-1-9747-4898-3
98. "Retribution" (報い, Mukui); 99. "Offense and Defense" (攻防, Kōbō); 100. "The Fundamentals of Mages" (魔法使いの基礎, Mahōtsukai no Kiso); 101. "Breakthrough" (打開策, Dakaisaku); 102. "A Tie" (相打ち, Aiuchi); 103. "Time for Retribution" (報いの時, Mukui no Toki); 104. "A Visit to Her Grave" (墓参り, Hakamairi); 105. "Golem" (ゴーレム, Gōremu); 106. "Sky-Mountain Dragon" (天脈竜, Ten myaku Ryū); 107. "The Monument of the Goddess" (女神の石碑, Megami no Sekihi)
Frieren restores Denken, who fights Macht, while Frieren confronts Solitär. Overpowered by her opponent, Frieren makes one last desperate move by using the rest of her mana to dispel Diagoldze across all the city, allowing the restored Fern to kill Solitär with a sniping attack and Denken to deal a fatal blow to a surprised Macht. In his last moments, Macht reunites and has a peaceful conversation with a restored Glück. After the battle, Glück learns that his crimes were discovered and that he will eventually face judgement, while Denken fulfills his longtime wish to pay a visit to his late wife's grave. Frieren and the others continue their journey, until they stumble on an ancient monument left behind by the Goddess. Upon examining the monument, Frieren's mind travels several decades to the past all the way to the time she was traveling with Himmel, Heiter and Eisen.
12	December 18, 2023	978-4-09-853030-4	February 11, 2025	978-1-9747-5181-5
108. "Reunion" (再会, Saikai); 109. "Zart the Remnant" (残影のツァルト, Zan'ei no Tsaruto); 110. "The Party of Heroes" (勇者一行, Yūsha Ikkō); 111. "Escort Mission" (護衛依頼, Goei Irai); 112. "Faith" (信頼, Shinrai); 113. "Abyssal Dragon" (皇獄竜, Kōgoku Ryū); 114. "The Sword of the Hero" (勇者の剣, Yūsha no Tsurugi); 115. "Best Friend" (親友, Shin'yū); 116. "Spell to Return" (帰還の魔法, Kikan no Mahō); 117. "Miraculous Illusion" (奇跡の幻影, Kiseki no Gen'ei)
After using a spell she learned in the future to defeat a powerful demon attacking the party, Frieren reveals the truth to the others, who believe her and agree to not inquire her further and keep the situation a secret to prevent a time paradox. With some investigation, the Hero's party discovers a way to send Frieren back to her rightful time, while Solitär and Grausam, one of the seven sages, are informed by the Demon King about Frieren's condition and attack them, intending to obtain her knowledge of the future for their own gains. Grausam uses his magic to trap the party into an idylic illusion where they are holding Himmel and Frieren's wedding.
13	April 17, 2024	978-4-09-853233-9	May 13, 2025	978-1-9747-5291-1
118. "Vialathor" (フィアラトール, Fiaratōru); 119. "Memories" (思い出, Omoide); 120. "False Image of a Hero" (虚像の英雄, Kyozō no eiyū); 121. "Monsters on the Road" (街道の魔物, Kaidō no mamono); 122. "The Titan Fortress Ruins" (ティタン城塞, Titan jōsai); 123. "Proof of Perseverance" (頑張ってきた証, Ganbatte kita akashi); 124. "Shadow Warrior" (影なる戦士, Kagenaru senshi); 125. "Family" (家族, Kazoku); 126. "A New Mission" (新たな任務, Aratana ninmu); 127. "Retrieval Mission" (回収任務, Kaishū ninmu)
With Frieren's help, Himmel breaks Grausam's illusion and safely escorts her to the Goddess monument, where she manages to return to the present. The reunited party continues their journey, entering the Empire's territory. While spending the night in a remote village, the party is attacked by Radar, an assassin and member of the "Shadow Warriors" with orders from the Empire to dispose of several mages, including Frieren herself and defeats him, sparing his life. Once arriving in the Imperial Capital Eiseberg, the party is contacted by Falsch and Sense, two mages from the Magic Association, who enlist their help to protect Serie while she attends an important event in the city, the "Foundation Festival", after learning that the Empire is also after her life, with assistance of two other mages they met during the exam, Übel and Land.
14	March 18, 2025	978-4-09-854017-4	February 10, 2026	978-1-9747-6158-6
128. "Magic Special Forces" (魔導特務隊, Madō Tokumutai); 129. "Shadow of the Empire" (帝国の影, Teikoku no Kage); 130. "Beneath the Water's Surface" (水面下, Suimenka); 131. "Escape" (脱出, Dasshutsu); 132. "Chase" (追跡, Tsuiseki); 133. "Silver Coins" (銀貨, Ginka); 134. "Trace Back" (逆探知, Gyaku Tanchi); 135. "Prelude" (前哨戦, Zenshōsen); 136. "Reunion" (再会, Saikai); 137. "Repel" (撃退, Gekitai)
Übel and Land make contact with a spy within the Empire but are discovered and arrested by the Magic Special Forces. They are taken into prison and escape afterwards. Meanwhile, some members of the Shadow Warriors attack Frieren's party. In the occasion, they reunite with Sein who just arrived at the city following the trail of his childhood friend and together, they fend off the attackers and regroup with the rest of their allies, just when Serie arrives at the capital to participate in the Foundation Festival.
15	December 18, 2025	978-4-09-854346-5	December 8, 2026	978-1-9747-6914-8
138. "Traitors" (逆賊, Gyakuzoku); 139. "Kreis the Blacksmith" (鍛冶屋のクライス, Kajiya no Kuraisu); 140. "The Ball" (舞踏会, Budōkai); 141. "Symbol of Peace" (平和の象徴, Heiwa no Shōchō); 142. "Enemy Encounter" (会敵, Kaiteki); 143. "Mind Games" (読み合い, Yomi ai); 144. "Prophetic Dream" (予知夢, Yochimu); 145. "Clairvoyance" (未来視, Mirai-shi); 146. "The Strongest Warrior" (人類最強の戦士, Jinrui Saikyō no Senshi); 147. "The Land with No Hero" (英雄のいない地, Eiyū no Inaichi)
Sein discovers that Kreis, his childhood friend whom he was searching for is one of the Shadow Warriors with orders to kill Serie but keeps it a secret. Frieren and the others accompany Serie and her escorts during the final ball of the Foundation Festival, unaware that Serie has already foreseen her imminent death and having accepted her fate, is negotiating with the Emperor the best outcome possible for her passing in order to prevent further bloodshed. As the ball progresses, a three-way battle begins between the Shadow Warriors, the Magic Special Forces and Serie's group.
