= Birdmen (manga) =

Japanese manga series

- First volume cover
- Genre: Science fiction
- Manga
- Written by: Yellow Tanabe
- Published by: Shogakukan
- Imprint: Shōnen Sunday Comics
- Magazine: Weekly Shōnen Sunday
- Original run: July 17, 2013 – February 5, 2020
- Volumes: 16
- icon

Birdmen (stylized in all caps) is a Japanese manga series written and illustrated by Yellow Tanabe. It was serialized in Shogakukan's shōnen manga magazine Weekly Shōnen Sunday from July 2013 to February 2020, with its chapters collected in sixteen tankōbon volumes.

== Plot ==
Eishi Karasuma (烏丸 英司, Karasuma Eishi), a disaffected and apathetic middle school student, leads an unremarkable life despite his inner frustrations. One day, he and his childhood friend Mikisada Kamoda (鴨田 樹真, Kamoda Mikisada), classmate Rei Sagisawa (鷺沢 怜, Sagisawa Rei), and her friend Tsubame Umino (海野 つばめ, Umino Tsubame) are involved in a bus accident. In his fading consciousness, Eishi glimpses a mysterious, crow-like humanoid with black wings. Though they should have died from severe blood loss, the group inexplicably survives with only minor injuries—only to discover they have gained the unnatural ability to grow wings from their backs. Thrust into an extraordinary existence as "Birdmen", Eishi and the others find their ordinary lives upended as they grapple with their newfound powers and the unseen forces now shaping their destinies.

== Publication ==
Written and illustrated by Yellow Tanabe, Birdmen started in Shogakukan's shōnen manga magazine Weekly Shōnen Sunday on July 17, 2013. The series went on hiatus from August to November of the same year. After resuming its publication, the manga was released on a monthly basis in the magazine. It finished on February 5, 2020. Shogakukan collected its 78 chapters in sixteen tankōbon volumes, published from October 18, 2013, to March 18, 2020.

=== Volumes ===
No.	Japanese release date	Japanese ISBN
1	October 18, 2013	978-4-09-124489-5
2	February 18, 2014	978-4-09-124569-4
3	July 18, 2014	978-4-09-125090-2
4	December 18, 2014	978-4-09-125415-3
5	May 18, 2015	978-4-09-125845-8
6	October 16, 2015	978-4-09-126477-0
7	March 18, 2016	978-4-09-127189-1
8	August 18, 2016	978-4-09-127333-8
9	January 18, 2017	978-4-09-127489-2
10	June 16, 2017	978-4-09-127578-3
11	November 17, 2017	978-4-09-127875-3
12	April 18, 2018	978-4-09-128229-3
13	September 18, 2018	978-4-09-128396-2
14	March 18, 2019	978-4-09-128790-8
15	August 16, 2019	978-4-09-129320-6
16	March 18, 2020	978-4-09-129719-8
