= Kai-hen Wizards =

Japanese manga series

- First tankōbon volume cover

界変の魔法使い (Kaihen no Mahōtsukai)
- Genre: Fantasy
- Manga
- Written by: Yellow Tanabe
- Published by: Shogakukan
- English publisher: NA: Viz Media
- Imprint: Shōnen Sunday Comics
- Magazine: Weekly Shōnen Sunday
- Original run: September 11, 2024 – present
- Volumes: 4
- icon

Kai-hen Wizards (Japanese: 界変の魔法使い, Hepburn: Kaihen no Mahōtsukai; lit. 'Wizards of World Change') is a Japanese manga series written and illustrated by Yellow Tanabe. It has been serialized in Shogakukan's shōnen manga magazine Weekly Shōnen Sunday since September 2024.

== Plot ==
The series follows a wizard named Zemu that lives in a remote castle far from the secular world, who is reluctant to take on an apprentice until he takes in a mysterious boy covered in bandages that does not remember who he is or where he came from. Their encounter marks the beginning of a crisis that will threaten the world.

== Publication ==
Written and illustrated by Yellow Tanabe, Kai-hen Wizards started in Shogakukan's shōnen manga magazine Weekly Shōnen Sunday on September 11, 2024. Shogakukan released the first tankōbon volume on February 18, 2025.

Viz Media is publishing the series in English simultaneously with its Japanese release.

=== Volumes ===
No.	Release date	ISBN
1	February 18, 2025	978-4-09-854015-0
1. "My Wizard" (僕の魔法使い, Boku no Mahōtsukai); 2. "Mana and Wizards" (魔力と魔法使い, Maryoku to Mahōtsukai); 3. "Wizard Killer" (魔法使い殺し, Mahōtsukai-goroshi); 4. "The Wizard's Nest" (魔法使いの巣, Mahōtsukai no Su); 5. "Those Who Use Magic" (魔法を使う者たち, Mahō o Tsukau Mono-tachi); 6. "The Wizard and His Apprentice" (魔法使いと弟子, Mahōtsukai to Deshi)
2	May 16, 2025	978-4-09-854116-4
7. "Wizards and Divine Eyes" (魔法使いと神眼, Mahōtsukai to Shingan); 8. "The Wizard of Yellow" (【黄】の魔法使い, "Ki" no Mahōtsukai); 9. "Magic Spells and Consequences" (魔法術と反動, Mahōjutsu to Handō); 10. "A Student of Magic" (魔法術入門, Mahōjutsu Nyūmon); 11. "Wizards and the World" (魔法使いと世界, Mahōtsukai to Sekai); 12. "The Wizard's Garden" (魔法使いの庭, Mahōtsukai no Niwa); 13. "The Wizard and the Illusion" (魔法使いと幻, Mahōtsukai to Maboroshi); 14. "The Wizard and Karma" (魔法使いと"業", Mahōtsukai to "Gō"); 15. "The Wizard and the Gem" (魔法使いと玉, Mahōtsukai to Gyoku); 16. "The Wizard and the Power of Gems" (魔法使いと玉の力, Mahōtsukai to Gyoku no Chikara)
3	December 18, 2025	978-4-09-854378-6
17. "Tag in a Wizard's Castle" (魔法使いの城で鬼ごっこ, Mahōtsukai no Shiro de Onigokko); 18. "The Friends in the Wizard's Castle" (魔法使いの城の仲間たち, Mahōtsukai no Shiro no Nakama-tachi); 19. "Night Tag in the Wizard's Castle" (夜の魔法使いの城で鬼ごっこ, Yoru no Mahōtsukai no Shiro de Onigokko); 20. "The Wizard and the Castle at Daybreak" (魔法使いと城の夜明け, Mahōtsukai to Shiro no Yoake); 21. "The Wizard and the Contract" (魔法使いと「契約」, Mahōtsukai to "Keiyaku"); 22. "The Wizard and the Start of the Journey" (魔法使いと旅のはじまり, Mahōtsukai to Tabi no Hajimari); 23. "The Wizard of Black" (【黒】の魔法使い, "Kuro" no Mahōtsukai); 24. "The Wizard and the First Town" (魔法使いと最初の町, Mahōtsukai to Saisho no Machi); 25. "The Wizard and the Shopping Trip" (魔法使いと最初の買い物, Mahōtsukai to Saisho no Kaimono); 26. "The Wizard and the Have-Nots" (魔法使いと持たざる者たち, Mahōtsukai to Motazaru Mono-tachi)
4	June 18, 2026	978-4-09-854656-5
27. "The Wizard and the Unkind World" (魔法使いと優しくない世界, Mahōtsukai to Yasashikunai Sekai); 28. "The Wizard and the River of Light" (魔法使いと光の川, Mahōtsukai to Hikari no Kawa); 29. "The Town of Wizards" (魔法使いの町, Mahōtsukai no Machi); 30. "The Wizard and the Bird-Masked Man" (魔法使いと鳥面の男, Mahōtsukai to Torimen no Otoko); 31. "The Magical Item District" (魔道具街, Madōgu-gai); 32. "The Wizard & What She Wants To Protect" (魔法使いと守りたいもの, Mahōtsukai to Mamoritai Mono); 33. "The Wizard & Desired Connections" (魔法使いと結びたいもの, Mahōtsukai to Musubitai Mono); 34. "The Wizard & the Selection" (魔法使いと選択, Mahōtsukai to Sentaku); 35. "The Wizard & the Journey's Destination" (魔法使いと旅の目的地, Mahōtsukai to Tabi no Mokutekichi); 36. "The Empire's Wizard" (帝国の魔法使い, Teikoku no Mahōtsukai)

== Reception ==
The series was nominated for the eleventh and twelfth Next Manga Awards in 2025 and 2026, respectively, in the print category.
