= Laughter at the World's End =

Japanese manga series

- Volume cover, featuring Luca

終末のラフター (Shūmatsu no Rafutā)
- Genre: Dark fantasy
- Manga
- Written by: Yellow Tanabe
- Published by: Shogakukan
- English publisher: SEA: Shogakukan Asia
- Imprint: Shōnen Sunday Comics Special
- Magazine: Weekly Shōnen Sunday
- Original run: November 21, 2012 – December 26, 2012
- Volumes: 1
- icon

Laughter at the World's End (Japanese: 終末のラフター, Hepburn: Shūmatsu no Rafutā) is a Japanese manga series written and illustrated by Yellow Tanabe. It was serialized for five chapters in Shogakukan's Weekly Shōnen Sunday manga magazine from November to December 2012. Shogakukan collected the chapters in a single tankōbon volume released in March 2013.

== Publication ==
Written and illustrated by Yellow Tanabe, Laughter at the World's End ran for five chapters in Shogakukan's Weekly Shōnen Sunday, from November 21 to December 26, 2012. Shogakukan collected the chapters in a single tankōbon volume, published on March 18, 2013.

The manga has been licensed in Southeast Asia by Shogakukan Asia.

No.	Japanese release date	Japanese ISBN
1	March 18, 2013	978-4-09-124282-2
1. "Man That Can't Die" (死なない男, Shinanai Otoko); 2. "Demon's Logic" (悪魔のロジック, Akuma no Rojikku); 3. "Demon Hunting" (悪魔狩り, Akuma Kari); 4. "A Child Demon" (子どもの悪魔, Kodomo no Akuma); 5. "Close to the Smile" (笑顔のそばに, Egao no Soba ni)
