= Shogakukan Asia =

Singaporean publishing company

Shogakukan Asia Pte. Ltd.
- Type: Subsidiary
- Industry: Publishing
- Founded: 18 September 2013
- Headquarters: Singapore
- Key people: Rony Neo (Managing Director); Bunsho Kajiya (General Manager)
- Products: Manga
- Parent: Shogakukan

Shogakukan Asia Pte. Ltd. (小学館アジア, Shōgakukan Ajia) is a Japanese publisher based in Singapore, specialising in English-translated manga and edutainment content that promotes and nurtures interest in Japanese arts and culture. The company, a subsidiary of Japanese publisher Shogakukan, opened in 2014.

The books are distributed in Singapore, Malaysia, Indonesia, Brunei, the Philippines, Thailand and Vietnam.

== Series ==
- BanG Dream!
- Beyblade X
- The Blood-Tied Lovers
- The Butler is King
- Detective Conan
- Doraemon
- Football Nation
- Future Card Buddyfight
- Frieren: Beyond Journey's End
- Koba Cute!
- Komi Can't Communicate
- Laughter at the World's End
- The Legendary Hero Is Dead!
- The LKY Story
- Magi: Adventure of Sinbad
- Magi: The Labyrinth of Magic
- Megane Collection
- Mobile Suit Gundam Thunderbolt
- Mob Psycho 100
- Pokémon Adventures
- Silver Spoon
- Tsumiki Ogami's Not-So-Ordinary Life
- Yo-kai Watch
- Zom 100

== See also ==
- Chuang Yi
