= Kekkaishi =

Japanese manga series

- First tankōbon volume cover, featuring Yoshimori Sumimura (right) and Madarao

結界師
- Genre: Adventure; Romance; Supernatural
- Manga
- Written by: Yellow Tanabe
- Published by: Shogakukan
- English publisher: NA: Viz Media
- Imprint: Shōnen Sunday Comics
- Magazine: Weekly Shōnen Sunday
- Original run: October 22, 2003 – April 6, 2011
- Volumes: 35
- Anime television series
- Directed by: Kenji Kodama
- Produced by: Koji Nagai (Yomiuri TV); Naohiro Ogata (Sunrise)
- Written by: Hiroshi Ōnogi
- Music by: Taku Iwasaki
- Studio: Sunrise
- Licensed by: NA: Viz Media (former); Discotek Media
- Original network: NNS (ytv, NTV) (1–37); ytv, NTV, YBC, ABS, NKT (38–52)
- English network: NA: Neon Alley; SEA: Animax Asia; US: Adult Swim
- Original run: October 16, 2006 – February 12, 2008
- Episodes: 52
- icon

Kekkaishi (結界師; lit. 'Barrier Master') is a Japanese manga series written and illustrated by Yellow Tanabe. It was serialized in Shogakukan's shōnen manga magazine Weekly Shōnen Sunday from October 2003 to April 2011, with its chapters collected in 35 tankōbon volumes. The series is about Yoshimori Sumimura and Tokine Yukimura, heirs to rival families of kekkai (barrier magic) users, who must defend their school from the spirits drawn to the sacred land upon which it is built.

A 52-episode anime television series adaptation produced by Sunrise was broadcast from October 2006 to February 2008. Both manga and anime series have been licensed for English release in North America by Viz Media. The anime series was broadcast in the United States on Adult Swim from May 2010 to May 2011.

The Kekkaishi manga had over 17 million copies in circulation by June 2020. In 2007, the manga won the 52nd Shogakukan Manga Award for the shōnen category.

== Plot ==
According to the legend, five hundred years ago, there was an insignificant lord who possessed a mysterious power that drew ayakashi (妖) (supernatural creatures) to him. A demon exterminator, Tokimori Hazama, was called upon to protect the lord and his castle. The lord's power stayed on the land even when he had died. Thus, Tokimori founded the Hazama clan, who inherited his techniques, to protect the land for centuries to come. This land is Karasumori (烏森).

In the present day, Yoshimori Sumimura and Tokine Yukimura, heirs of the Hazama clan, are the kekkaishi (結界師) that protect Karasumori (which is located on the grounds of the school they attend). They are ability users (people who can use supernatural powers) who use a technique called Kekkai (結界). Kekkai is a form of magical energy barrier which is primarily used to capture and destroy ayakashi that are drawn to this shin'yūchi (神佑地, "sacred land"). Any ayakashi that stay on the land become stronger. Yoshimori and Tokine are to guard the land from the intrusion of ayakashi who try to "power-up" there.

Yoshimori and Tokine suffered a lot of hardships in their responsibilities to protect Karasumori. The ayakashi they must fight are becoming more and more powerful, but they managed to protect the land with the help from Yoshimori's older brother, Masamori Sumimura, and the Urakai (裏会, "Shadow Organization"). The Shadow Organization itself is an organization of ability users that is governed by a council of twelve, consisting of high level ability users. All the members are not the main inheritors of their clans lands or titles, or are loners who have no place to go, and thus have become a force that controls the course of their country.

Many ayakashi try to become more powerful by using Karusumori's power, including Kokuboro (a group of ayakashi attempting to restore their leaders power), corrupt members of Urakai's council of twelve who either were in league with Kokuboro or trying to kill another council member. Eventually a civil war begins between the leader and founder of Urakai, the leader (a powerful psychic who became a puppet of the founder) and the founder (another powerful psychic who alone with his power create Urakai, an army/intelligence agency at his disposal) who have become disembodied creatures who can possess others to act as their bodies to fool the other members into thinking the leadership of Urakai has changed hands.

Over the course of the story it is revealed little by little that the legend is full of lies. The real source of Karasumori's power is Chūshinmaru (宙心丸), an illegitimate son of the Hazama clan's founder, Tokimori Hazama, and the Karasumori clan's heiress. Tokimori used forbidden arts to try to give his son unearthly power, but the plan backfired, and instead gave Chūshinmaru the power to draw people's life force, killing everybody around him. Tokimori was forced to seal his own son beneath Karasumori. However, being alone with no aid Tokimori was unable to completely seal off the Shinkai he created, which allowed Chūshinmaru's power to leak out, and it is this that draws ayakashi to the land.

In the end, with the help of Yoshimori's mother and Tokimori, Yoshimori and Tokine find a new site for Chūshinmaru by displacing the founder of the Urakai from the domain of a land-god that the founder had taken over. To seal Chūshinmaru, Yoshimori's mother sacrifices herself by sealing the domain with herself inside. The series end with Urakai finally becoming better for all and the two families duties are finally finished ending their personal rivalry, with Yoshimori finally feeling everything was right with the world.

== Production ==
Yellow Tanabe says that she uses reference books with pictures as inspiration for designs of ayakashi. She used her own images of the appearances of kanji characters of special terms and placed the terms in a system in order to create the special powers of the Kekkaishi and the terms of magic in the series. In regards to what inspired her to create the Shadow Organization, she said "I'm not really sure. I just sort of thought that's the way organizations are."

== Media ==
=== Manga ===
Written and illustrated by Yellow Tanabe, a prototype of Kekkaishi was first published in Shogakukan's shōnen manga magazine Weekly Shōnen Sunday on April 23, 2003 (Note: The prototype was published in the magazine's 21st issue of 2003 (cover date May 7), released on April 23.) (later posted online in 2009). It was serialized in the same magazine from October 22, 2003, (Note: The series started in the magazine's 47th issue of 2003 (cover date November 5), released on October 22.) to April 6, 2011, finishing with 345 chapters. Shogakukan collected its chapters in 35 tankōbon volumes, released from February 18, 2004, to August 18, 2011. Shogakukan re-released the series in an eighteen-volume kanzenban edition, published from June 18, 2020, to February 18, 2021.

The series is licensed for English release in North America by Viz Media. Viz Media released the 35 volumes of Kekkaishi from May 3, 2005, to December 11, 2012.

A guidebook to the series, titled Kekkaishi: A Teacher's Guidance (結界師 指南之書, Kekkaishi Shinan no Sho), was published by Shogakukan, under the Shōnen Sunday Comics Special imprint, on December 16, 2006.

=== Anime ===
Kekkaishi was adapted by Sunrise as an anime television series directed by Kenji Kodama with character designs by Hirotoshi Takaya and music by Taku Iwasaki. The series was broadcast for 52 episodes between October 16, 2006, and February 12, 2008, on Yomiuri TV, Nippon Television and other Nippon Television Network System stations. The opening theme is "Sha la la: Ayakashi Night" (Sha la la -アヤカシNIGHT-) by Saeko Ura. There are four ending themes: "Akai Ito" (赤い糸; lit. 'Red Thread') by Koshi Inaba (episodes 1–15, 38, 40, 48, 52), "Sekaijū Doko o Sagashite mo" (世界中どこを探しても, lit. 'Looking for Another World') by Aiko Kitahara (episodes 16–23, 39, 44, 51), "My Mirai" (マイミライ, Mai Mirai; lit. 'My Future') by Ura (episodes 24–30, 41, 46, 49), and "Kyukei Jikan 10pun" (休憩時間10分, Kyūkei Jikan Jippun; lit. '10 Minute Break') by Ura (episodes 31–37, 42–43, 45, 47, 50).

The anime was licensed in North America by Viz Media. which began broadcasting episodes online through Hulu in January 2010. The series premiered on TV on May 29, 2010, on Cartoon Network's block Adult Swim. Discotek Media re-licensed the series after Viz Media lost the rights. It was only confirmed for streaming, but a home video release was hinted at a later date. Crunchyroll added the series to its catalog in May 2021.

=== Video games ===
Namco Bandai Games released three "action based" games for the Wii and Nintendo DS, Kekkaishi Karasumori Ayakashi Kidan (結界師 烏森妖奇談) on May 24, 2007, and Kekkaishi Kokuboro Shurai (結界師 黒芒楼襲来) on March 20, 2008. A Wii game (結界師 黒芒楼の影; Kekkaishi Kokuboro no Kage) Kekkaishi: Shadow of the Kokuboro was released on September 27, 2007, in Japan.

== Reception ==
Kekkaishi had over 15 million copies in circulation by April 2011. The manga had 17 million copies in circulation by June 2020. Volumes 19–21 debuted among the first four places on Tohan's best-selling manga list in 2008.

In 2007, Kekkaishi won the 52nd Shogakukan Manga Award in the shōnen category. The English edition of Kekkaishi was named by the Young Adult Library Services Association as among the best graphic novels for teens for 2007.

During its initial broadcast, episodes of the anime series were frequently among the top ten rated anime television shows, sometimes as the only original (non-sequel) show to do so.
