= Yellow Tanabe =

Japanese manga artist

Yellow Tanabe 田辺 イエロウ
- Born: Tokyo, Japan
- Area: Manga artist
- Notable works: Kekkaishi
- Awards: 52nd Shogakukan Manga Award for shōnen manga for Kekkaishi

Yellow Tanabe (田辺 イエロウ, Tanabe Ierō; born June 13) is a Japanese manga artist. She was an assistant for Mitsuru Adachi and Makoto Raiku and made her debut in 2002 with the short story Lost Princess. She is best known for the manga series Kekkaishi, which has been adapted as an anime television series and translated into many languages. She published a one-shot story in the inaugural issue of the revival of Monthly Shōnen Sunday in May 2009.

She was born on June 13 in Tokyo, and she graduated from the Musashino Art University. In 2007 she won the Shogakukan Manga Award for shōnen manga for Kekkaishi.

== Works ==
- Kekkaishi (結界師) (2003–2011; serialized in Shogakukan's Weekly Shōnen Sunday)
- Laughter at the World's End (終末のラフター, Shūmatsu no Rafutā) (2012; serialized in Shogakukan's Weekly Shōnen Sunday)
- Birdmen (2013–2020; serialized in Shogakukan's Weekly Shōnen Sunday)
- Kai-hen Wizards (界変の魔法使い, Kaihen no Mahōtsukai) (2024–present; serialized in Shogakukan's Weekly Shōnen Sunday)
