= List of The Law of Ueki chapters =

The chapters of The Law of Ueki are written and illustrated by Tsubasa Fukuchi and serialized in Shogakukan shōnen magazine Weekly Shōnen Sunday. The serial chapters are collected in 16 tankōbon with the first one released on December 18, 2001 and the last one on January 14, 2005. The series was followed by a sequel The Law of Ueki Plus which also ran on Shōnen Sunday and its serial chapters collected into 5 tankōbon published between August 8, 2005 and September 18, 2007.

In North American only the first series has been published by Viz Media with the 16 volumes released between August 8, 2006 and February 10, 2009.

== Volume list ==
=== The Law of Ueki ===
| No. | Original release date | Original ISBN | English release date | English ISBN |
|---|---|---|---|---|
| 01 | December 18, 2001 | 4-09-126341-0 | August 8, 2006 | 1-4215-0716-1 |
001 "Is Kosuke Ueki an Alien From Outer Space?"; 002 "Mori Ai's Resolve"; 003 "The Scariest Person - Suzuki Sakura"; 004 "One Who Doesn't Fight Plus One Who Doesn't Run"; 005 "The Reason To Become Stronger"; 006 "The Battle Starts"; 007 "The Worst Affinity!"; 008 "Against The Rules"
| 02 | February 18, 2002 | 4-09-126342-9 | October 10, 2006 | 1-4215-0717-X |
009 "A Man Called Seiichiro Sano"; 010 "A Reason to Get Angry"; 011 "The Rival"; 012 "The Law of Ueki"; 013 "Entrust the World to the Victor"; 014 "Li Ho, Master of Hand-to-Hand Combat"; 015 "A Reason Not to Use Your Power"; 016 "Battle Beyond Supernatural Powers"; 017 "Hip Hopper B.J. the Liar"; 018 "Robert Haydn!"
| 03 | May 18, 2002 | 4-09-126343-7 | December 12, 2006 | 1-4215-0718-8 |
019 "Nice to Meet You!"; 020 "Red and Blue"; 021 "A Special Moment"; 022 "True Encounter"; 023 "The Tree Devil"; 024 "Mr. K's Last Message"; 025 "The New Candidate"; 026 "It's 215 Against 8"; 027 "Yotchan's True Identity"; 028 "Head to Head!"
| 04 | May 18, 2002 | 4-09-126344-5 | February 13, 2007 | 1-4215-0910-5 |
029 "The Brave Warrior Appears?!"; 030 "Fair and Square"; 031 "Honorable Fight"; 032 "Onimon's Special Training"; 033 "Reunion and Omen"; 034 "Many Visitors"; 035 "Kurokage"; 036 "Justice Unrewarded"; 037 "Breaking the Rules"; 038 "Unforgivable"
| 05 | October 18, 2002 | 4-09-126345-3 | April 10, 2007 | 1-4215-0911-3 |
039 "Unexpected Invitation"; 040 "Initiation"; 041 "Impossible!"; 042 "The Present from the Sky"; 043 "Big Decision"; 044 "One Star"; 045 "Sacred Weapons"; 046 "Confession"; 047 "Don the Powerful"
| 06 | December 18, 2002 | 4-09-126346-1 | June 12, 2007 | 1-4215-0912-1 |
048 "I Want to Become Strong!"; 049 "Time Limit: 24 Hours"; 050 "The Deadly Chef"; 051 "Mr. K's Justice"; 052 "Rinko's Betrayal"; 053 "Limit"; 054 "Tenko and Rinko Put It All on the Line"; 055 "Neo Celestial Power"; 056 "Two Powers"
| 07 | February 18, 2003 | 4-09-126347-X | August 14, 2007 | 1-4215-0913-X |
057 "Taro's Weak Point"; 058 "Kurogane vs. Lazer Beam"; 059 "He's My Friend!!!"; 060 "Over My Dead Body"; 061 "Dogra Mansion"; 062 "The Power to Change Electricity into Sugar"; 063 "All Because of You The Law of Ueki"; 064 "Mori's Tactics"; 065 "The Hat War"; 066 "The Cat and Mouse Game"
| 08 | May 17, 2003 | 4-09-126348-8 | October 9, 2007 | 1-4215-0914-8 |
067 "Big Mistake!!!"; 068 "Bring It On!!"; 069 "Contest of Strength"; 070 "The Jump Rope War"; 071 "Sano's Secret"; 072 "Inumaru's Pride"; 073 "I Won't Lose!!"; 074 "The Powers of Robert's 10 vs. Kosuke Ueki"; 075 "Those Were My Thoughts"; 076 "A Child from the Celestial World"
| 09 | August 8, 2003 | 4-09-126349-6 | December 11, 2007 | 1-4215-0915-6 |
077 "Laughter Echoing in the Darkness"; 078 "Ueki's Justice"; 079 "The Gap Between Them"; 080 "Damage"; 081 "Sano and Rinko"; 082 "The Reason to Keep on Fighting"; 083 "Right On!!"; 084 "No Choice"; 085 "Hanon"; 086 "Encounter"
| 10 | October 18, 2003 | 4-09-126350-X | February 12, 2008 | 1-4215-1525-3 |
087 "Enter Hideyoshi"; 088 "Zack's Plan"; 089 "Hideyoshi vs. Ugo"; 090 "Defense Line"; 091 "Battles of the Second Round"; 092 "Hideyoshi's Past"; 093 "The Road to an Advisor Is Longer than a Day"; 094 "The Final Awakening Chamber"; 095 "I Have to Stop Them"; Special "Ai Mori's Special Extra Feature Ueki's Sacred Weapon Research File"
| 11 | December 18, 2003 | 4-09-127031-X | April 8, 2008 | 1-4215-1691-8 |
096 "Popsicle"; 097 "Departure!!"; 098 "Begin!!"; 099 "The Enemy's Power"; 100 "Brains vs. Brawn!!"; 101 "Combination Play"; 102 "Fight"; 103 "Ultimate Tag Team"; 104 "True Strength"; 105 "Leader Battle"
| 12 | March 18, 2004 | 4-09-127032-8 | June 10, 2008 | 1-4215-1692-6 |
106 "The Strength of Your Determination"; 107 "Rest for the Warriors?"; 108 "Clash! Ueki vs. Li Ho!!"; 109 "Power and Potential"; 110 "Prison Life"; 111 "The Marilyn Battle Begins!"; 112 "Ueki's Strategy"; 113 "Degree of Strength"; 114 "The Most Efficient Way to Fight"; 115 "Equal Battle"
| 13 | May 18, 2004 | 4-09-127033-6 | August 12, 2008 | 1-4215-1693-4 |
116 "The Friends' Battle"; 117 "The Power of Helping Each Other"; 118 "The Symbol of Friendship"; 119 "Escape Route"; 120 "I Won't Let You Die!"; 121 "I Won't Let You Go After Them!!"; 122 "Power Difference"; 123 "Sano Awakens!"; 124 "Is This Fun?"; 125 "Fight!"
| 14 | August 6, 2004 | 4-09-127034-4 | October 14, 2008 | 1-4215-1694-2 |
126 "The Last Hand"; 127 "In The Med Room"; 128 "Unpredictable Development"; 129 "Which Do You Choose?"; 130 "Pagu"; 131 "Team Barrow"; 132 "Van, Rinko and the Sacred Weapon"; 133 "The Celestial Army"; 134 "A True Man"; 135 "Determination"
| 15 | November 18, 2004 | 4-09-127035-2 | December 9, 2008 | 1-4215-1695-0 |
136 "Exactly as Planned"; 137 "That's All"; 138 "Zero-Star Ueki"; 139 "Why Drop the Sacred Weapons?"; 140 "Ueki's Power"; 141 "Barrow's Goal"; 142 "The Young King"; 143 "The Girl of Destiny"; 144 "The King vs. Margaret!!!"; 145 "The Night Before the Fourth Round"; Special "Sano's Vacation"
| 16 | January 14, 2005 | 4-09-127036-0 | February 10, 2009 | 1-4215-1696-9 |
146 "Hanon's Rules"; 147 "The Final Round Begins!!"; 148 "Margaret's Plot"; 149 "Each and Every Emotion"; 150 "Don't Die"; 151 "Ueki vs.Hanon!!"; 152 "The Image of Strength"; 153 "Final Battle!!"; Final Chapter "The Talent of Blank"; Special "Bonus Corner"

=== The Law of Ueki Plus ===
| No. | Japanese release date | Japanese ISBN |
|---|---|---|
| 1 | August 8, 2005 | 978-4-09-127037-5 |
01. Determination: The Chance of a Lifetime; 02. Heading Towards Hagenkai World; 03. What Is 'Power'?; 04. Fight with the Store Owner!; 05. The Washing Machine Test!; 06. A Favor for Nagara; 07. Haiji's Style
| 2 | November 18, 2005 | 978-4-09-127038-2 |
08. Vs Power User Shiro.; 09. A Brother's Responsibility.; 10. Ueki and Haiji.; 11. The Awakening of a Power User!.; 12. Haiji Comes Home.; 13. The New Teammate – Sora.; 14. Invisibility Power User, Davy.; 15. Let's Go!! It's the Selection Battle!!.; 16. The Next Test...?.; 17. Team Battles!
| 3 | January 18, 2007 | 978-4-09-120877-4 |
18. Vs Hair Salon Jet Black!.; 19. Very Suspicious.; 20. Byaku's Power.; 21. Ueki's Teammates.; 22. Ueki's Belief.; 23. A Lucky Circumstance.; 24. Experience vs. Teammates.; 25. The Tight-Knit Team.; 26. An Invading Group
| 4 | June 18, 2007 | 978-4-09-121080-7 |
27. Here We Come.; 28. A New Face...?!.; 29. The Power to Uphold Promises.; 30. Haiji's Awakening.; 31. Sora's Belief.; 32. Double Hamburgers.; 33. The Power's True Potential.; 34. Ruining the Reunion.; 35. The Last Hope.; 36. I Don't Need Teammates!
| 5 | September 18, 2007 | 978-4-09-121189-7 |
37. The Unbreakable Thing.; 38. An Even Stupider Idiot.; 39. Before the Journey.; 40. The Sudden Reunion.; 41. Plus and Nagara.; 42. The Worst Game.; 43. Attack and defence.; 44. Ueki vs. Plus: Second Round!!.; 45. I Want to Believe.; 46. The Aftermath.
