= Yu Hasebe =

Japanese actress, singer and model (born 1986)

- 長谷部 優
- Born: 17 January 1986 (age 40); Gifu, Japan
- Occupations: Singer, model, actress
- Spouse: Kenta Nitta (m. 2019)
- Children: 1
- Musical career
- Genre: Japanese Pop
- Years active: 2000–2007 (dream); 2007–2008 Kingyo; 2008–present (solo)
- Label: Avex Trax (1999–2007)
- Website: ameblo.jp/hasebeyu

Yu Hasebe (長谷部 優, Hasebe Yū; born 17 January 1986) is a Japanese actress, singer and model. She was one of the original three members of the J-Pop group "Dream". She debuted as a gravure idol in 2004. She has also starred in a number of Japanese movies and TV dramas. She was formerly a member of a unit called Kingyo with Nao Nagasawa and Aiko Kayō.

== Filmography ==
=== Movies ===
- Chikan Otoko (2005)
- Love Psycho (2006)
- Mayonaka no Shōjotachi (2006)
- Backdancers! (2006)

=== TV ===
- Mahora no Hoshi (2005)
- Karera no Umi VII: Wish on the Polestar (2005)
- Girl's Box (2005)
- Koi Suru!? Kyaba Jō (2006)

== Discography ==
=== Shared singles ===
- Keitai Aika Sonogo / Gōkon Aika Sonogo (携帯哀歌 その後/合コン哀歌 その後) (with Tokyo Purin) (11 January 2006)

=== Various artists' albums ===
- Girl's Box: Best Hits Compilation (16 March 2005)
- Girl's Box: Best Hits Compilation Winter (30 November 2005)
- Backdancers! Original Soundtrack (23 August 2006)

== Other releases ==
=== DVD ===
- Natural (28 January 2005)
- Move in I Love Yu (23 September 2005)
- Dramatic Space (27 April 2007)

=== Photobooks ===
- Yu & I (16 March 2005)
- I Love Yu (31 July 2005)
- Talk to... Twelve Flowers (15 December 2006)
