= Kingyo =

Kingyo (Japanese: goldfish) may refer to:

- Kingyo Rock, rock which lies at the south side of Omega Glacier where the glacier meets the sea, on the coast of Queen Maud Land
- Kingyo, 2009 short film by Edmund Yeo loosely adapted from "Canaries" by Yasunari Kawabata
- Kingyo (band), Japanese band consisting of former Dream member Yu Hasebe and soloists Aiko Kayō and Nao Nagasawa
- Kingyo (song), song by Bonnie Pink
- "Kingyo", song by Miki Furukawa
- "Kingyo", song by Miyuki Nakajima

== See also ==
- Goldfish Warning! (きんぎょ注意報!, Kingyo Chūihō!) is a shōjo manga by Neko Nekobe
- Bataashi Kingyo (バタアシ金魚) Japanese manga series by Minetarō Mochizuki and live action film directed by Joji Matsuoka in 1990.
- Kingyo Used Books (Japanese: 金魚屋古書店, Hepburn: Kingyoya Koshoten) Japanese manga series
- Kingyo Hanabi (金魚花火; Goldfish Fireworks) Ai Otsuka's fifth single 2004
- Goldfish scooping (金魚すくい, 金魚掬い, Kingyo-sukui) is a traditional Japanese game in which a player scoops goldfish with a special scooper
