= List of Kekkaishi chapters =

The cover of Kekkaishi volume 1 as released by Viz Media on 3 May 2005 in North America.

Kekkaishi is a shōnen fantasy manga written and illustrated by Yellow Tanabe. It was serialized in the weekly Japanese manga magazine Weekly Shōnen Sunday from 2003 issue 47 to 2011 issue 19. Serial chapters have been collected in tankōbon volumes by Shogakukan, with the first released on 18 February 2004, all 35 volumes completed with the last volume published on 18 August 2011. The series is about teenagers Yoshimori Sumimura and Tokine Yukimura, heirs to rival clans of kekkai (barrier magic) users, who must defend their school from the spirits drawn to the sacred land it is built upon. Kekkaishi received the 2007 Shogakukan Manga Award for shōnen manga.

Viz Media announced in April 2005 that they had acquired the rights to translate and distribute Kekkaishi in North America. Viz released volume one on 3 May 2005, the 35th and last volume is scheduled to release on 11 December 2012. In July 2009, Viz announced the creation of their new imprint Shonen Sunday, which Kekkaishi would be moved under, and the launching of a dedicated website where individual chapters of Kekkaishi and other Shonen Sunday series are now being serialized. It is also licensed in France by Pika Édition, in Germany by Carlsen Comics, in Hong Kong by Rightman Publishing Limited, in Indonesia by Elex Media Komputindo which serializes it in Shōnen Star, in Italy by Planet Manga, in Malaysia by PCM Comics, in South Korea by Bookbox, in Spain by Editorial Ivrea, in Taiwan by Tong Li Comics, and in Vietnam by Kim Dong.

Kekkaishi has been adapted into a 52-episode anime series by Sunrise, which was broadcast on Nippon Television, Yomiuri TV, and Nippon News Network between 16 October 2006 and 12 February 2008. It has also been adapted into three video games.

== Chapter and volume list ==
Note: This list uses Viz's official English-translated titles through volume 32, unofficial Japanese translations thereafter.

No.	Original release date	Original ISBN	North America release date	North America ISBN
1	18 February 2004	4-09-127061-1	3 May 2005	978-1-59116-968-0
001. "Yoshimori and Tokine" (良守と時音, "Yoshimori to Tokine"); 002. "Scars" (傷, "Kizu"); 003. "Yoshimori's Ambition" (良守の野望, "Yoshimori no Yabō"); 004. "Human Ghost" (人間霊, "Ningen Rei"); 005. "Nutrients" (養分, "Yōbun"); 006. "A Dangerous Man" (危険な男, "Kiken na Otoko"); 007. "Flower of Passion" (情熱の花, "Jōnetsu no Hana")
Yoshimori Sumimura is a kekkaishi, or barrier master, an expert in fighting demons. Currently in his second year in junior high, he is training to become the 22nd kekkaishi in his family line. Each night, he patrols Karasumori, a cursed area that attracts supernatural beings of all sorts and is now the site of Yoshimori's school. This duty has been passed down through his family for generations. Tokine Yukimura, Yoshimori's next-door neighbor, is also a kekkaishi. The Sumimuras and the Yukimuras have been quarreling for more than 400 years over which family is the legitimate successor to their kekkaishi school. As a child, Yoshimori made a mistake that caused Tokine to suffer a serious injury. Yoshimori was deeply shaken by this incident. Devoting himself to his training, he promised himself that he would become a strong man and be able to protect Tokine in the future.
2	17 April 2004	4-09-127062-X	16 August 2005	978-1-59116-970-3
008. "Tokio Yukimura" (雪村時雄, "Yukimura Tokio"); 009. "Demon Tamer" (鬼使い, "Oni Tsukai"); 010. "Memories and Hatred" (追憶と憎悪, "Tsuioku to Zōo"); 011. "Promise" (誓い, "Chikai"); 012. "Yoshimori vs. Yoki" (良守vsヨキ, "Yoshimori baasasu Yoki"); 013. "Shadow Organization" (裏会, "Urakai"); 014. "That's All" (ただそれだけ, "Tadasoredake"); 015. "Cold Weather Cherry Blossoms (Part 1)" (寒桜(前編), "Kanzakura (Zenpen)"); 016. "Cold Weather Cherry Blossoms (Part 2)" (寒桜(後編), "Kanzakura (Kōhen)")
One night, a demon tamer named Yomi and her demon servant, Yoki, attempt to take over the Karasumori site for their own purposes. Aided by the magical power emanating from the site, Yoki transforms himself into an extremely powerful demon. Yoshimori and Tokine struggle to defeat him. In the midst of the battle, men with magical abilities arrive from the secretive "shadow organization", which oversees the work of the kekkaishi, and mercilessly destroy Yoki. The Karasumori site continues to attract ayakashi who wish to boost their supernatural power. Yoshimori and Tokine have no idea what forces they will face in their next battle!
3	18 June 2004	4-09-127063-8	15 November 2005	978-1-4215-0067-6
017. "Yoshimori's Days, Part 1" (良守の日々(前編), "Yoshimori no Hibi (Zenpen)"); 018. "Yoshimori's Days, Part 2" (良守の日々(中編), "Yoshimori no Hibi (Chūhen)"); 019. "Yoshimori's Days, Part 3" (良守の日々(後編), "Yoshimori no Hibi (Kōhen)"); 020. "A 400-Year Reunion" (4世紀ぶりの再会, "4-Seiki Buri no Saikai"); 021. "Ginro and Koya" (銀露と鋼夜, "Ginro to Kōya"); 022. "The Garden" (庭, "Niwa"); 023. "Mountain Dogs" (山犬たち, "Yamainutachi"); 024. "Parting" (別離, "Betsuri"); 025. "Resealing" (再封印, "Saifūin"); 026. "Black Devil" (黒い悪魔, "Kuroi Akuma")
A ferocious ayakashi demon dog named Koya shows up at the Karasumori site, and everyone is shocked to find out that Koya is an old friend of Madarao, the Sumimura family's demon dog. Madarao wants to be the one to bring Koya down, but in order to do so, the collar that limits his full power must be removed. Yoshimori reluctantly releases Madarao from his collar and an epic canine battle ensues. Madarao manages to defeat Koya, but Yoshimori's lack of training causes Madarao to endure horrible pain while Yoshimori struggles to reseal the collar. Yoshimori regrets that he is not more skilled as a kekkaishi, but he does manage to tie the collar around Madarao's neck. Having come through this ordeal together, the relationship between Madarao and Yoshimori is strengthened, and for the first time Madarao fully acknowledges Yoshimori as his true master.
4	17 September 2004	4-09-127064-6	21 February 2006	978-1-4215-0253-3
027. "Resonance, Part 1" (残響(前編), "Zankyō (Zenpen)"); 028. "Resonance, Part 2" (残響(中編), "Zankyō (Chūhen)"); 029. "Resonance, Part 3" (残響(後編), "Zankyō (Kōhen)"); 030. "Big Brother and Little Brother" (兄と弟, "Ani to Otōto"); 031. "Masamori Sumimura" (墨村正守, "Sumimura Masamori"); 032. "Hoin" (方印, "Hōin"); 033. "Running Forest" (走る森, "Hashiru Mori"); 034. "Over the Sky" (空の上にて, "Sora no Ue nite"); 035. "Resolution" (決意, "Ketsui"); Mini Gaiden
The Shadow Organization member named Masamori Sumimura, Yoshimori's big brother, arrives at the Karasumori site, much to Yoshimori's disgust. The next night, Masamori creates a scheme where Yoshimori's school grounds full of forests, in which Yoshimori's and Tokine's surprise. Yoshimori and Tokine are trying to destroy one of the trees, but to no avail. Having to fend off Masamori's scheme, Yoshimori promises Masamori to become stronger, and sealing off Karasumori's power forever.
5	18 November 2004	4-09-127065-4	16 May 2006	978-1-4215-0486-5
036. "What is Karasumori?" (なんなんだ?, "Nan Nanda?"); 037. "Lord Uro" (ウロ様, "Uro-sama"); 038. "Colorless Marsh" (無色沼, "Mushoku Numa"); 039. "Divine Field" (神の領域, "Kami no Ryōiki"); 040. "Footprints of the Divine" (神様の足跡, "Kami-sama no Ashiato"); 041. "Toshimori's Days" (利守の日々, "Toshimori no Hibi"); 042. "Secrets" (隠し事, "Kakushikoto"); 043. "Feathers" (羽, "Hane"); 044. "White Feather Kids" (白羽児, "Shiraha Ji"); 045. "Tokine's Arrow" (時音の矢, "Tokine no Ya")
Yoshimori has come up with a grand scheme to seal off the power of Karasumori forever. In order to accomplish this impossible task, he must not only train and perfect his skills, but he must delve deep into the mystery surrounding his ancestral lands. One night, three identical ayakashi, called the White Feather Kids, infiltrate the Karasumori site. Yoshimori and Tokine have a difficult time, but finally succeed in terminating them thanks to Tokine's refined kekkai techniques. From a distance, a suspicious-looking man observes the fray. Who is he and why is he watching them?
6	18 February 2005	4-09-127066-2	15 August 2006	978-1-4215-0487-2
046. "Observer" (監視者, "Kanshisha"); 047. "Research" (研究, "Kenkyū"); 048. "Claw Marks" (爪跡, "Tsumeato"); 049. "Gen Shishio" (志々尾限, "Shishio Gen"); 050. "Birthplace" (生家, "Seika"); 051. "Uninvited Guest" (招かれざる客, "Manekarezaru Kyaku"); 052. "Masamori and Gen" (正守と限, "Masamori to Gen"); 053. "Big-Headed Wheel" (大首車, "Daikubi Kuruma"); 054. "Legitimate Heir" (正統継承者, "Seitō Keishōsha"); 055. "Reward" (賞金首, "Shōkin Kubi")
One day, an ayakashi perfectly disguised as a man enters the Karasumori site. After the violent encounter with him, Yoshimori and Tokine worry that more such ayakashi may soon begin intruding. A few days later, a boy named Gen Shishio arrives; he has been sent by the mysterious "Shadow Organization" to assist the Karasumori kekkaishi. Gen, who possess some ayakashi powers, is awkward around Masamori, Yoshimori's big brother, because he idolizes him. Meanwhile, a secret organization with evil intentions awaits an opportunity to seize the Karasumori site...
7	18 May 2005	4-09-127067-0	21 November 2006	978-1-4215-0488-9
056. "Curtain Call" (最後の称賛, "Saigo no Shōsan); 057. "Prince of Central East High" (中高のプリンス, "Chūkou no Purinsu"); 058. "Kimiya Hachioji" (八王子君也, "Hachioji Kimiya"); 059. "Karasumori's No. 1" (烏森で一番, "Karasumori de Ichiban"); 060. "Grandpa's Night" (じじいの夜, "Jijii no Yoru"); 061. "Council of Twelve" (十二人会, "Jūnininkai"); 062. "Forever..." (ずっと..., "Zutto..."); 063. "Declaring War" (宣戦, "Sensen"); 064. "Negotiation" (交渉, "Kōshō"); 065. "Kaguro" (火黒, "Kaguro")
Our heroes have been joined by a new ally named Gen, who has been sent by the mysterious Shadow Organization. Meanwhile, Yoshimori's big brother, Masamori, has been promoted to the Organization's elite Council of Twelve. Now a secret organization of ayakashi, Kokuboro, has launched an attack on the Karasumori site. Dressed in "skins" that disguise them as humans and enable them to appear in daylight, five Kokuboro assassins barge into Yoshimori's school in the middle of the afternoon to challenge our heroes. The three teenagers accept, and decide to take them on alone that very night... But when Yoshimori and Tokine refuse to hand over the Karasumori site to the ayakashi "negotiators", the Kokuboro wound Gen and threaten to finish him off if they don't get in their evil way! Then Gen's would-be rescuers are lured into their opponent's kekkai trap, which neutralizes their powers. Now everyone's life is on the line...!
8	15 July 2005	4-09-127068-9	20 February 2007	978-1-4215-0828-3
066. "Three Dimensions" (三次元, "Sanjigen"); 067. "Indebted" (借り, "Kari"); 068. "Elegance" (美学, "Bigaku"); 069. "No, Not That One" (ダメだよ, "Dame da yo"); 070. "The Best Man for the Job" (適任, "Tekinin"); 071. "Four Years Ago (Part 1)" (4年前(前編), "4 Nen Mae (Zenpen)"); 072. "Four Years Ago (Part 2)" (4年前(中編), "4 Nen Mae (Chūhen)"); 073. "Four Years Ago (Part 3)" (4年前(後編), "4 Nen Mae (Kōhen)"); 074. "The Ogi Clan" (扇一族, "Ōgi Ichizoku"); 075. "Decision" (決定, "Kettei")
The Shadow Organization has forbidden Gen and his kind to transform completely into an ayakashi. But during a clash with assassins from the Kokuboro Clan, Gen loses his temper and nearly undergoes a total transformation! Gen fears that the Shadow Organization will punish him for his transgression. The possibility that his tour of duty at the Karasumori Site might be terminated deeply distresses him. But Yoshimori's big brother, Masamori, leader of the Night Troops, rallies behind Gen and permits him to continue fighting by Yoshimori and Tokine's side...
9	16 September 2005	4-09-127069-7	15 May 2007	978-1-4215-0829-0
076. "Caged Bird" (籠の鳥, "Kago no Tori"); 077. "Atora Hanashima" (花島亜十羅, "Hanashima Atora"); 078. "Raizo" (雷蔵, "Raizo"); 079. "Dog Fight" (空中戦, "Kūchūsen"); 080. "Gagin and Hekian" (牙銀と碧闇, "Gagin to Hekian"); 081. "A Rat" (鼠, "Nezumi"); 082. "Assault" (襲撃, "Shūgeki"); 083. "The Final Journey" (最後の旅路, "Saigo no Tabiji"); 084. "The Master's Throne" (主の座, "Omo no Ma"); 085. "Agony" (煩悶, "Hanmon")
Gen's former Night Troops instructor, Atora, pays Gen a surprise visit at Karasumori. She is displeased with his inability to work with Yoshimori and Tokine as a team, and subjects them all to rigorous training exercise to bring them up to snuff. Meanwhile, the Kokuboro ayakashi send a reconnaissance expedition to the Colorless Marsh in hopes of unseating its master, and follow up with an assassination attempt on Heisuke Matsudo, an expert on their demon kind. But Heisuke fakes his demise, fooling not just his enemies, but his old friend, Yoshimori's Grandpa, as well. Is all this nefarious activity a sign that Kokuboro is about to launch a full-scale attack against the Karasumori Site...!?
10	15 December 2005	4-09-127070-0	21 August 2007	978-1-4215-0909-9
086. "Baby Steps" (胎動, "Taidō"); 087. "Portable Throne" (動座, "Dōza"); 088. "Attack of the Kokuboro" (黒芒楼襲来, "Kokubōrō Shūrai"); 089. "Pandemonium" (百鬼夜行, "Hyakkiyagyō"); 090. "Alliance" (連携, "Renkei"); 091. "Flame Monster" (炎鬼, "Honoo Oni"); 092. "Total Transformation" (完全変化, "Kanzen Henka"); 093. "Omen" (兆し, "Kizashi"); 094. "Sea of Flame" (火の海, "Hi no Umi"); 095. "Eternity" (永遠に, "Eien ni")
11	17 February 2006	4-09-120107-5	20 November 2007	978-1-4215-1159-7
096. "Funeral" (葬列, "Sōretsu"); 097. "Together" (一緒に, "Isshoni"); 098. "A Passage to Kokuboro" (黒芒への道, "Kokubōrō e no Michi"); 099. "The Crows of Backyard Mountain" (裏山の鴉, "Urasuyama no Kurasu"); 100. "The Members of the Night Troop" (夜行の面々, "Yakō no Menmen"); 101. "Skirmishes" (小競り合い, "Kozeriai"); 102. "Resurgence" (再来, "Sairai"); 103. "Interception" (迎撃, "Geigeki"); 104. "Kokuboro's Hostage" (黒芒の俘虜, "Kokubōrō no Furyo"); 105. "Fighting Alone" (孤軍, "Kogun")
Heartbroken over his friend's death, Yoshimori eventually channels his grief and rage into training to become an even greater kekkaishi. He vows to destroy Gen's killer, Kaguro, and in a ploy to gain entry into the Kokuboro castle, surrenders to his enemies. Sen Kagemiya, a member of the kekkaishi night troop, is captured as well. Coincidentally, Yoshimori's grandfather's closest friend, Heisuke Matsudo—thought to be murdered by ayakashi—infiltrates the Kokuboro castle at the same time, with the intention of hunting down Byaku, a leader of the Kokuboro with whom Matsudo seems to have a longstanding feud. Inside the Kokuboro castle, despite being at the mercy of his captors, Yoshimori confronts Kaguro while Matsudo prepares for his showdown with Byaku...
12	18 May 2006	4-09-120378-7	18 February 2008	978-1-4215-1524-3
106. "The Castle" (城, "Shiro"); 107. "Rescue" (救出, "Shūshutsu"); 108. "Byaku and Matsudo" (白と松戸, "Byaku to Matsudo"); 109. "Hollow Man" (空っぽの男, "Karappo no Otoko"); 110. "Advance Payment" (前払い, "Maebarai"); 111. "Aihi" (藍緋, "Aihi"); 112. "Flower Ayakashi" (妖花, "Yō Hana"); 113. "The Man Who Would Not Die" (死ねない男, "Shinenai Otoko"); 114. "Outside the Other World" (異界の外, "Ikai no Soto"); 115. "Achilles Heel" (弱点, "Jakuten")
Yoshimori infiltrates his enemy's lair, Kokuboro Castle, to avenge his friend, Gen Shishio, who fell in battle. First, he has to rescue Sen Kagemiya, a member of the "Night Troops", who followed him there only to be caught and held captive. Meanwhile, Tokine, Masamori (Yoshimori's elder brother) and the rest of the Night Troops use Tokine's grandmother's magical passageway to Kokuboro Castle to try and rescue Yoshimori and Sen. Just as Kokuboro Castle is beginning to completely disintegrate, Yoshimori finally locates Kaguro, Gen's murderer, and confronts him. At first, Kaguro tries to tempt Yoshimori to join his side. Then, armed with powerful magical sword, he charges him at full force. Kaguro's strength only increases as his fight with Yoshimori progresses. But just when Kaguro is about to defeat him, Yoshimori generates the most extraordinary kekkai he has ever produced...!
13	15 September 2006	4-09-120630-1	20 May 2008	1-4215-1689-6
116. "Different" (ズレ, "Zure"); 117. "Advice" (忠告, "Chūkoku); 118. "True Power" (真の力, "Shin no Chikara"); 119. "Escape" (脱出, "Dasshutsu"); 120. "Return Home" (帰路, "Kiro"); 121. "Slap" (ビンタ, "Binta"); 122. "A Visitor" (来訪者, "Raihōsha"); 123. "Kiyoko" (キヨコ, "Kiyoko"); 124. "A Stake" (釘, "Kugi"); 125. "Master and Disciple" (師匠と弟子, "Shishō to Deshi)
Yoshimori infiltrates Kokuboro Castle and confronts his nemesis, Kaguro, Thanks to selfless support of Sen, one of Masamori's night troops, Yoshimori prevails. At Kokuboro Castle disintegrates around them, Yoshimori lies unconscious after having generated a powerful magical attack known as zekkai. In the nick of time, Masamori and his night troops come to the pair's rescue. In the aftermath of the Kokuboro battle, things are just beginning to return to normal in the Karasumori Forest when a young man named Takeshi appears claiming to be a fumashi—one who seals off the malevolent energy of evil beings. Takeshi reveals to Yoshimori that he has come to destroy the monster who murdered his master...
14	16 October 2006	4-09-120650-6	19 August 2008	1-4215-1690-X
126. "Jaren" (邪煉, "Jaren"); 127. "Temptation" (誘惑, "Yūwaku"); 128. "Confidence" (強気, "Tsuyoki"); 129. "Master-Servant Contract" (主従契約, "Shujū Keiyaku"); 130. "Of Kekkai and Zekkai" (結界と絶界, "Kekkai to Zekkai"); 131. "Unwanted Guest" (迷惑な客, "Meiwaku na Kyaku"); 132. "Giant Goblin" (大天狗, "Ō-tengu"); 133. "Lord and Master" (殿, "Dono"); 134. "Inspection" (査察, "Sasatsu"); Gaiden. "Yoshimori's First Battle (良守の初陣, "Ryōshu no Iijin")
Ichiro Ogi, the eighth member of the Shadow Organization's Council of Twelve, accuses Masamori of botching the battle against the Kokuboro. In hopes of discrediting Masamori, Ogi initiates a council inspection of the Karasumori Site. The council's ninth member, Okuni, is assigned to oversee the inspection. But just before Okuni arrives at the Karasumori Site, a mysterious black box is delivered to the headquarters of Masamori's night troops, and Misao, a young night trooper, is sucked inside! And then an identical box appears at the Karasumori Site... Is all this a cowardly conspiracy against Yoshimori and Masamori...or the start of something even more menacing?
15	18 January 2007	978-4-09-120878-1	18 November 2008	1-4215-1951-8
135. "Boxes" (箱, "Hako"); 136. "Hostages" (人質, "Hitojichi"); 137. "No Exit" (出口, "Deguchi"); 138. "The True Nature of the Box" (箱の正体, "Hako no Shotai"); 139. "Four Ayakashi" (4体の妖, "4 Karada no Yō"); 140. "Cocoon" (繭, "Mayu"); 141. "Kurokabuto" (黒兜, "Kurokabuto"); 142. "Responsibility" (責任, "Sekinin"); 143. "Warp" (ゆがみ, "Yagami"); 144. "Total Body" (完全体, "Kansen Karada")
Ichiro Ogi, the eighth member of the Shadow Organization's Council of Twelve, accuses Masamori of botching the battle against the Kokuboro. The council's ninth member, Okuni, is assigned to oversee the inspection of the Karasumori Site and its guardians. But just before Okuni arrives at the Karasumori Site, mysterious black boxes are delivered both the site and the headquarters of Masamori's night troops. Two young night troopers escape imprisonment in one of the boxes, which acts as a portal, and now Tokine has entered a box to further unravel its mysteries. Meanwhile, out of a huge cocoon hidden inside the Karasumori school, a huge ayakashi emerges and proceeds to wreak havoc. If it grows to full size, it will be unstoppable!
16	18 April 2007	978-4-09-121028-9	17 February 2009	978-1-4215-2222-7
145. "The Wrath of Karasumori" (烏森の怒り, "Karasumori no Ikari"); 146. "Order" (秩序, "Chitsujo"); 147. "Report" (報告, "Hōkoku"); 148. "Julia" (ジュリア, "Juria"); 149. "Jealousy" (ヤキモチ, "Yakimochi"); 150. "Love Triangle" (三角関係, "Sankakukankei"); 151. "It Fell from the Sky!" (落ちてきた!, "Ochitekita!"); 152. "Water Dragon" (水龍, "Mizu Ryū"); 153. "The Guilty Party" (犯人, "Han'nin"); 154. "Phone Call from Masamori" (兄の電話, "Ani no Denwa")
Lately the ayakashi have been relentlessly attacking the Karasumori site. This has caused the shadow organization to assert more and more control over the site. As they struggle to deal with these situations, Yoshimori and Tokine gradually perfect their kekkaishi skills. With school out for spring break Yoshimori is feeling very happy – that is until he receives a phone call from his brother Masamori asking for help. Yoshimori reluctantly agrees to assist Masamori and travels him to a holy site that is a gateway to the other world. The reason Masamori has for bringing his brother to this site is still unclear.
17	18 July 2007	978-4-09-121150-7	19 May 2009	978-1-4215-2223-4
155. "Abyss" (淵, "Fuchi"); 156. "Deity Tan-Yu (淡幽, "Tan'yū"); 157. "Mudo" (無道, "Mudō"); 158. "Old Ally" (盟友, "Meiyū"); 159. "Genuine Zekkai" (本物の絶界, "Honmono no Zekkai); 160. "Immortality" (不死, "Fushi"); 161. "Imperfection" (矯正, "Kyōsei"); 162. "Masamori's Choice" (兄の選択, "Ani no Sentaku"); 163. "The Guardian Deity's Power" (主の力, "Omo no Chikara"); 164. "Jealousy" (嫉妬, "Shitto")
While helping Masamori, Yoshimori is drawn into a holy site where he encounters Mudo, the man Masamori is trying to attack. Mudo has abandoned his humanity and become an ayakashi. Having absorbed incredible power from the guardian deity of the holy site, Mudo appears to be unbeatable even if Masamori and Yoshimori work together! As the brothers face almost certain death, the deity Tan-yu marshals his last bit of strength to seal off his holy site and save their lives. The holy site is sealed off, but Masamori is stranded inside the site alone with Mudo...
18	18 October 2007	978-4-09-121205-4	18 August 2009	978-1-4215-2457-3
165. "A Promise" (約束, "Yakusoku"); 166. "Traitor" (裏切り者, "Uragirimono"); 167. "Mind Reading" (読心, "Dokushin"); 168. "Intelligence Unit" (諜報班, "Chōhō Han"); 169. "Sen Kagemiya" (影宮閃, "Kagemiya Sen"); 170. "They Came Flying" (飛来, "Hirai"); 171. "Undercover Action" (隠密行動, "Onmitsu Kōdō"); 172. "Panic" (恐慌, "Kyōkō"); 173. "Four Kekkaishi" (集結, "Shūketsu"); 174. "Cubic Formation" (四師方陣, "Yonshi Hōjin")
When Yoshimori enters ninth grade, the Shadow Organization enrolls Night Troopers Shu and Sen in the Karasumori school system to monitor the kekkaishi guardians. Secretly, Shu is studying to develop his telepathic powers and possibly abandon the Night Troops. One day, an ayakashi in the form of a tiny black butterfly enters the Karasumori School grounds... The mysterious creature multiplies exponentially despite Yoshimori and his colleagues' desperate efforts to terminate it and its "offspring." Soon the school is engulfed in a cloud of talking butterflies who warn of impending doom! Then they begin to attack the students... Yoshimori's grandfather Shigemori and Tokine's grandmother Tokiko rush to their grandchildren's aid. For the first time, all four Kekkaishi heirs will stand and fight together! The quartet pitches a huge cubic kekkai to envelop the mass of butterflies. Will they able to maintain their formation and coordinate their energies in time to save hundreds of innocent students...?
19	12 January 2008	978-4-09-121265-8	17 November 2009	978-1-4215-2612-6
175. "Compression" (圧縮, "Asshuku"); 176. "Prophecy" (予言, "Yogen"); 177. "Psychic Saki" (巫女サキ, "Miko Saki"); 178. "The Crows" (カラス, "Karasu"); 179. "Confinement on the Mountain" (山籠り, "Yamagomori"); 180. "Tobimaru" (飛丸, "Tobimaru"); 181. "Investigation" (調査, "Chōsa"); 182. "The Visit" (訪問, "Hōmon"); 183. "Wind Wizard" (風使い, "Kaze Tsukai"); 184. "Deity Slayer" (神殺し, "Kami Koroshi")
One day, ayakashi butterflies bring a prophecy of impending doom to Karasumori. Then a major mystical site, Lake Mashiro, is attacked. In the aftermath of these disturbing developments, an investigator visits Yoshimori's family. It appears the Shadow Organization suspects Yoshimori's mother is behind the attacks on the mystical sites! Angered by the accusation against his mother, Yoshimori threatens the investigator's companion, Rokuro Ogi, a "wind master." Meanwhile, Ichiro Ogi, Masamori's archrival, lures Masamori to one of the mystical sites...
20	18 April 2008	978-4-09-121348-8	9 February 2010	1-4215-2784-7
185. "Conspiracy of Wind" (風の謀略, "Kaze no Bōryaku"); 186. "Watchdog" (番人, "Bannin"); 187. "Deal" (取引, "Torihiki"); 188. "Elder Brother's Wish" (兄の望み, "Ani no Nozomi"); 189. "Masamori vs. the Ogis" (正守対扇, "Masamori Tsui Ōgi"); 190. "Giant Tornado" (巨大竜巻, "Kyodai Tatsumaki"); 191. "Flesh" (肉塊, "Nikukai"); 192. "Youth" (若さ, "Wakasa"); 193. "Worry" (本気で心配, "Honki de Shinpai"); 194. "Left Behind" (おいてけぼり, "Oitekebori")
When Ichiro Ogi, the archrival of Yoshimori's brother Masamori, causes the deaths of several of his Night Troops, Masamori challenges him. Their battle is fierce, but Masamori eventually triumphs—or so it seems. Instead of Ichiro, it is his little brother Rokuro who lies dying at the scene. It turns out that Ichiro is an entity composed of all of the Ogi brothers—brothers who have abandoned their youngest to save themselves. Masamori asks Okuni, a powerful member of the Council of Twelve, to save Rokuro. In exchange, he agrees to form an alliance with her...
21	11 July 2008	978-4-09-121429-4	11 May 2010	1-4215-2785-5
195. "Descent From the Heavens" (降臨, "Kōrin"); 196. "Rain" (雨, "Ame"); 197. "The School Is Sinking" (学校沈没, "Gakkō Chinbotsu"); 198. "Making a Decision" (決断, "Ketsudan"); 199. "Infamy" (汚名, "Omei"); 200. "Hida Village" (緋田郷, "Hidagō"); 201. "Requiem" (供養, "Kuyō"); 202. "Target" (狙い, "Nerai"); 203. "Destruction" (崩壊, "Hōkai"); 204. "The Center of Power" (力の中心, "Chikara no Chūshin"); 205. "Guidance" (伝授, "Denju")
Mystical sites are under attack... And now a guardian deity whose own site was ravaged wreaks havoc on Karasumori. Disregarding the prohibition against harming a deity, Tokine terminates him in order to save the site and her loved ones! While attempting to return the slain deity's magical umbrella to his deteriorating mystical site, Yoshimori is behest by an unknown assiliant. His attacker retrieves a mysterious broken kekkaishi staff. Is this an attempt to hide incriminating evidence...? Meanwhile, two Shadow Organization agents arrive at Tokine's home to interrogate her...
22	17 October 2008	978-4-09-121496-6	6 July 2010	1-4215-3069-4
206. "Special Investigations Unit" (特捜班, "Tokusō Han"); 207. "Headless Island" (断頭島, "Dantō Shima"); 208. "Interrogation" (詰問, "Kitsumon"); 209. "Escape" (逃走, "Tōsō"); 210. "Island Manhunt" (島狩り, "Shima Kari"); 211. "Setting a Fire" (着火, "Chakka"); 212. "Rat Run" (抜け道, "Nukemichi"); 213. "Judgment" (判断, "Handan"); 214. "True Nature" (本性, "Honshō"); 215. "Resistance" (抵抗, "Teikō")
To protect the Karasumori site, Tokine slays a guardian deity—a serious crime. Special Investigations Unit agents haul her to their headquarters for questioning. Mistrusting the agents' motives, Yoshimori and his Night Troops allies set out to bring her back. Tokine escapes with the help of Yugami, one of the investigators. A vicious operative named Saiko pursues Tokine, but Yoshimori saves her. The two kekkaishi barely manage to catch their breaths before they are faced with a new challenge...
23	16 January 2009	978-4-09-121565-9	12 October 2010	978-1-4215-3200-4
216. "Yashiro" (夜城, "Yashiro"); 217. "Reform" (変革, "Henkaku"); 218. "Reliance" (わがまま, "Wagamama"); 219. "Big-Hearted" (包容力, "Hōyōryoku"); 220. "Distraction" (邪念, "Janen"); 221. "Fissure" (地割れ, "Jiware"); 222. "Helper" (助っ人, "Suketto"); 223. "Soji Hiura" (氷浦蒼士, "Sōji Hiura"); 224. "Special Site" (小一宮, "Shōichi Miya"); 225. "Illusion" (幻影, "Gen'ei")
Mt. Okubi, a prominent mystical site, is attacked and destroyed. A mysterious fissure cracks open the ground of the Karasumori Site. What is the connection between these two events...? A crack team of three warriors from the Night Troops come to Karasumori. Then fifteen-year-old Soji arrives, claiming he was sent by the Shadow Organization. But Yoshimori thinks Soji is the masked attacker who assaulted him in Hida Village... Now Karasumori is attacked by two huge ayakashi. To test Soji's loyalty and talents, Yoshimori sics him on one of the intruders. Will Soji prove to be an ally or an enemy...?!
24	17 April 2009	978-4-09-121894-0	11 January 2011	978-1-4215-3529-6
226. "Abilities" (実力, "Jitsuryoku"); 227. "Intruders" (侵入者, "Shin'nyūsha"); 228. "A Change of Plans" (方針転換, "Hōshin Tenkan"); 229. "I Just Follow Orders" (命令中心, "Meirei Chūshin"); 230. "The Unlucky One" (貧乏くじ, "Binbō Kuji"); 231. "Soji and Gen" (氷浦と志々尾, "Hiura to Shishio"); 232. "'No Thought' Box" (無想箱, "Musō Bako"); 233. "Sorcery Unit" (まじない班, "Majinai Han"); 234. "Scream" (わがまま, "Wagamama"); 235. "Vampire" (吸血, "Kyūketsu")
Yoshimori and friends protect Karasumori from two gigantic ayakashi brought by two mysterious figures who cast a spell and slip away. To teach Yoshimori about the essence of kekkai magic, his grandfather gives him a "No Thought" box. To break it, Yoshimori must learn to empty his mind... Easier said than done—even for him! Meanwhile, the Night Troops' Sorcery Unit attempts to undo the spell cast on Karasumori. Unfortunately, the site's reaction to their efforts causes Shu to transform into a vampire! When he attacks Tokine, their new ally Soji rushes to her defense...
25	18 June 2009	978-4-09-122015-8	12 April 2011	978-1-4215-3530-2
236. "My People" (周りの人間, "Mawari no Ningen"); 237. "State of Mind" (心の状態, "Kokoro no Jōtai"); 238. "'No Thought' Room" (無想部屋, "Musō Beya"); 239. "No. 1" (壱号, "Ichigō"); 240. "Shimano" (縞野, "Shima No"); 241. "Setting an Example" (見せしめ, "Miseshime"); 242. "War" (戦争, "Sensō"); 243. "Justice" (正義, "Seigi"); 244. "Plunging" (突入, "Totsunyū"); 245. "Bull's Eye" (蛇の目, "Ja no Me")
Yoshimori is desperately trying to learn the kekkai discipline of emptying his mind. Meanwhile, his older brother Masamori travels to the stronghold of his archrival Ichiro Ogi (a monstrous amalgamation of several Ogi brothers!) to apprehend him. But before Masamori arrives, the youngest Ogi brother and heir apparent murders his older siblings! Next, Okuni, Masamori's ally on the Council of Twelve, is found dead. Who is responsible? And does someone have designs on the Shadow Organization itself?! Now Saki, the prophet of doom, reappears at Karasumori...
26	17 September 2009	978-4-09-121744-8	14 June 2011	978-1-4215-3687-3
246. "Cruel Future" (残酷な未来, "Zankoku na Mirai"); 247. "A Certain Person" (ある人物, "Arujinbutsu"); 248. "Perfect Form" (完成形, "Kansei Katachi"); 249. "Grim Reaper" (死神, "Shinigami"); 250. "Common Ground" (共通点, "Kyōtsuuten"); 251. "Excess Power" (過剰な力, "Kajō na Chikara"); 252. "Special One" (特別な人間, "Tokubetsu na Ningen"); 253. "Assignment & Promise" (任務と約束, "Ninmu to Yakusoku"); 254. "Condition" (条件, "Jōken"); 255. "Clowns" (ピエロ, "Piero")
Increasingly worried about the attacks on the Karasumori Site, Yoshimori struggles the grasp the essence of kekkai magic. After intensive training, he comes very close to mastering the critical technique of emptying his mind... Meanwhile, the truth about the mystical site attacks begins to emerge. The supreme leader of the Shadow Organization, Nichinaga Omi, is the prime suspect. The case against Omi grows when it is revealed that he commissioned the assassinations of key members of the Council of Twelve. Yoshimori's training is not yet complete when two witches descend upon the Karasumori Site and amaze Yoshimori and the others by levitating the entire school...
27	18 December 2009	978-4-09-122027-1	9 August 2011	978-1-4215-3783-2
256. "Revolution" (回転, "Kaiten"); 257. "Prodigy" (神童, "Shindō"); 258. "Power Source" (動力源, "Dōryokugen"); 259. "No. 3" (参号, "Sangō"); 260. "Combatants" (戦闘員, "Sentōin"); 261. "Power" (力, "Chikara"); 262. "100%" (10割, "Jū-wari"); 263. "Ally and Enemy" (敵味方, "Teki Mikata"); 264. "Lie" (嘘, "Uso"); 265. "Zero" (零, "Zero")
Two witches, Michiru and Kakeru, use their powerful magic to viciously attack the Karasumori Site while holding the entire nearby town hostage! Yoshimori and his Night Troops attempt to repel the attack, but their chances seem even more remote when the witches' partners, warriors No. 1 and No. 2, arrive. Meanwhile, Masamori pays a visit to Hisaomi Yumeji, a key member of the Council of Twelve, at his residence. There, Masamori learns of a longstanding feud between Yumeji and his elder brother, Nichinaga Omi, the Shadow Organization's supreme leader. Masamori's meeting with Yumeji ends abruptly when Zero, a hit man sent by Nichinaga, raids Yumeji's home. Back at Karasumori, the battling kekkaishi and their allies are overwhelmed. Will Yoshimori's power be enough to repel them?
28	18 February 2010	978-4-09-122185-8	11 October 2011	978-1-4215-3871-6
266. "Ultimate Mind Emptying" (極限無想, "Kyokugen Musō"); 267. "Magic Spell Neutralization" (まじない破り, "Majinai Yaburi"); 268. "Magic Spell Neutralized" ("Majinai Goroshi"); 269. "Face-to-Face" (一対一, "Sashi"); 270. "Let's Make a Deal" (契約成立, "Keiyaku Seiritsu"); 271. "Denial" (拒絶, "Kyozetsu"); 272. "Prepared to Be Equal" (同等の覚悟, "Dōtō no Kakugo"); 273: "Karasumori" (烏森, "Karasumori"); 274: "True End" (本当の終わり, "Hontō no Owari"); 275: "Grim Reaper" (災いの神, "Wasawai no Kami)
Masamori is asking Yumeji, executive member of the Shadow Organization's Council of Twelve, some pointed questions when Zero, a hit man sent by the organization's Supreme Leader, arrives... Masamori unsuccessfully attempts to ward off Zero's attack, and Yumeji is killed. Back at the Karasumori Site, Yoshimori finally masters the technique of emptying his mind. Using his new powers, he summarily defeats Michiru and Kakeru, the two witches who have been holding Karasumori in their thrall. But then the heir of the Ogi Clan, Shichiro Ogi (a.k.a. Grim Reaper) shows up at the scene and proceeds to kill the witches and seriously wound Yoshimori's new friend and ally, Soji...!
29	18 May 2010	978-4-09-122296-1	13 December 2011	978-1-4215-4035-1
276: "Beyond Human Capability" (人の枠, "Hito no Waku"); 277: "White Zekkai" (白い絶界, "Shiroi Zekkai"); 278: "Dawn" (夜明け, "Yoake"); 279: "Apprehension" (心配, "Shinbai"); 280: "Awakening" (目覚め, "Mezame"); 281: "The Ogi Men" (扇の男, "Ōgi no Otoko"); 282: "Record Keeper" (記録係, "Kirokugakari"); 283: "Suigetsu" (水月, "Suigetsu"); 284: "Homecoming" (帰還, "Kikan"); 285: "The Last Night" (最後の夜, "Saigo no Yoru")
Assassin Shichiro Ogi has accidentally critically injured Soji, the mysterious boy who has been helping guard Karasumori. Yoshimori's fury causes his power to spiral out of control—until Tokine brings him back to his senses. Soji is recovering, but just as he begins to open up to the people who have grown to care about him, he vanishes! Meanwhile, Yoshimori's absentee mother, Sumiko, returns home and announces that she has come for the Lord of Karasumori. What does she mean...?! Elsewhere, Masamori begins to distinguish himself as a leader within the Shadow Organization's Council of Twelve—which has recently lost many of its executive members...
30	18 August 2010	978-4-09-122507-8	14 February 2012	978-1-4215-4036-8
286: "The Lord" (お殿様, "Otono-sama"); 287: "The Castle Keep" (天守閣, "Tenshukaku"); 288: "Laughter" (笑い声, "Waraigoe"); 289: "Tag" (鬼ごっこ, "Onigokko"); 290: "The Time Has Come" (その時, "Sono Toki"); 291: "Far Away" (遠くへ, "Tōku e"); 292: "The New Karasumori Castle" (新烏森城, "Shin Karasumorijō"); 293: "Kumon" (九門, "Kumon"); 294: "Door" (扉, "Tobira"); 295: "Phase Two" (第2段階, "Dai-ni Dankai")
Yoshimori enters the mysterious black castle that has arisen from the Karasumori Site. When he at last meets Karasumori's guardian face-to-face, he is confronted by...a little child with an innocent smile. Guided by the shikigami who is the splitting image of his mother, Sumiko, Yoshimori sets out on a journey to transport Lord Chushinmaru from Karasumori to a new home. The two reach an abandoned house in the mountains where Yoshimori hopes to train to seal the Lord of Karasumori once and for all. But the two are confronted by a mysterious man who controls an ayakashi named Kumon...and Yoshimori is easily lured into a trap!
31	18 October 2010	978-4-09-122626-6	10 April 2012	978-1-4215-4037-5
296: "Trap" (罠, "Wana"); 297: "The Founder" (開祖, "Kaiso"); 298: "Resurrection" (再生, "Saisei"); 299: "Ambition" (野心, "Yashin"); 300: "Arashizaki Shrine" (嵐座木神社, "Arashizaki Jinja"); 301: "Shinkai" (真界, "Shinkai"); 302: "Serious" (本気, "Honki"); 303: "The King" (王様, "Ou-sama"); 304: "The Vessel" (器, "Utsuwa"); 305: "Hatred" (憎悪, Zouo)
Yoshimori begins training with his mother's shikigami at an abandoned mountainside mansion to learn how to permanently seal away Lord Chushinmaru. The man who appeared with the ayakashi Kumon to test Yoshimori's skill turned out to be Tokimori Hazama, the founder of the Hazama-style kekkai technique. Tokimori has been waiting 400 years for the opportunity to teach his new technique, Shinkai, to someone worthy of it... Meanwhile, from the documents left by her beloved Michiru, Kakeru discovers the true nature of Nichinaga, the leader of the Shadow Organization—and vows revenge. Nichinaga has chosen Arashizaki Shrine, the home of the Ogi Family, as his next target. The time for a definitive battle draws near...!
32	17 December 2010	978-4-09-122717-1	12 June 2012	978-1-4215-4150-1
306: "Territory" (縄張り, "Nawabari"); 307: "Invasion" (侵攻, "Shinkō"); 308: "Casting" (狙い, "Nerai"); 309: "Defeat" (戦争, "Sensō"); 310: "Attack on the Shadow Organization HQ" (総本部襲撃, "Sōhonbu Shūgeki"); 311: "All-Out War" (総力戦, "Sōryokusen"); 312: "Underdog" (敗残, "Haizan"); 313: "Tsukikage" (月影, "Tsukikage"); 314: "God-Forsaken Child" (忌み子, "Imiko"); 315: "The Flow of Power" (注がれる力, Sosogareru Chikara)
33	18 February 2011	978-4-09-122783-6	14 August 2012	978-1-4215-4151-8
316: "Fate" (因果, Inga); 317: "Father and Child" (父と子, Chichi to Ko); 318: "Kidoin Nura" (鬼童院ぬら, Kidoin Nura); 319: "Raijin" (雷神, Raijin); 320: "Wind [of change]" (風向き, Kazamuki); 321: "Comrades" (同志, Dōshi); 322: "Smile" (笑顔, Egao); 323: "Hakuma" (覇久魔, Hakuma); 324: "Mission" (使命, Shimei); 325: "Infiltration" (潜入, Sennyū)
34	18 May 2011	978-4-09-122873-4	9 October 2012	978-1-4215-4197-6
326: "Persuasion" (説得, Settoku); 327: "Utsusemi" (空身, Utsusemi); 328: "The Night Before" (前夜, Zenya); 329: "The Truth" (真実, Shinjitsu); 330: "Battle Start" (開戦, Kaisen); 331: "Ogre Princess" (鬼姫, Oni Hime); 332: "Guidance" (導き, Michibiki); 333: "The Plan" (計画, Keikaku); 334: "Tsukihisa" (月久, Tsukihisa); 335: "A Sudden Change" (急転, Kyūten)
35	18 August 2011	978-4-09-123216-8	11 December 2012	978-1-4215-4271-3
336: "Falsification" (改竄); 337: "Message" (伝言); 338: "Judgement" (審判); 339: "Last Moments" (最期); 340: "Reassignment" (鞍替え); 341: "One's role" (役割); 342: "Creation" (創造); 343: "Sumiko" (守美子); 344: "Parting" (別れ); 345: "Epilogue" (終章)

== See also ==
- List of Kekkaishi episodes
- List of Kekkaishi characters
