= Shōnen Star =

Indonesian manga magazine

- Categories: Shōnen manga
- Frequency: Semi-Monthly
- Publisher: Elex Media Komputindo
- First issue: January 2005
- Final issue: November 2013
- Country: Indonesia
- Based in: Shogakukan
- Language: Indonesian
- ISSN: 0216-1737

Shōnen Star was the Indonesian version of Weekly Shōnen Sunday published by Elex Media Komputindo (member of Gramedia group), the largest comic publisher in Indonesia in 2005. The magazine published Kurozakuro, Robot Boys, My Wing, Midori's Days, etc. Due to government regulation of pornography so the censorship was considered to be too strict. Formerly the magazine had been published monthly but as of July 2010 the magazine was published twice a month. In November 2013 the magazine was cancelled at volume 16.

== Manga series ==
Title	Manga artist
Detective Conan (名探偵コナン)	Gosho Aoyama
T.R.A.P (トラップ)	Yamatoya Eco
Chiisai Hito: Aoba Jidou Soudanjou Monogatari (ちいさいひと 青葉児童相談所物語)	Kyouchikuto Jin
Anagle Mole (アナグルモール)	Tsubasa Fukuchi
Osumoji! Tsukasa no Ikkan (おすもじっ！司の一貫)	Kaga Mitsuhiro
Magi: The Labyrinth of Magic (マギ)	Shinobu Ohtaka
Buyuden (武勇伝)	Takuya Mitsuda
Hajimete no Aku (はじめてのあく)	Shun Fujiki
Dr. Kotō Shinryōjo (Dr.コトー診療所)	Takatoshi Yamada
Kekkaishi (結界師)	Yellow Tanabe
Gin no Saji (銀の匙)	Arakawa Hiromu
The World God Only Knows (神のみぞ知るセカイ)	Tamiki Wakaki

== See also ==
- List of manga magazines published outside of Japan
