= Nanase Hoshii =

Nanase Hoshii 星井 七瀬
- Born: Yuma Hoshino (星野 由真); November 14, 1988 (age 37); Tochigi Prefecture, Japan
- Occupations: Singer; entertainer; actress
- Years active: 2003 –
- Label: Fitone
- Website: Official profile

Yuma Hoshino (星野 由真, Hoshino Yuma; born November 14, 1988), better known as Nanase Hoshii (星井 七瀬, Hoshii Nanase), is a Japanese singer, entertainer, and actress who is represented by the talent agency, Fitone. She was born in Tochigi Prefecture, Japan.

== Discography ==
=== Studio albums ===
Title	Year	Details	Peak chart positions	Sales
Title	Year	Details	JPN	Sales
Sakura no Hana (桜の花)	2004	Released: February 25, 2004; Label: EMI Music Japan; Format: CD; Track listing: 1. "Taiyō no Juice" (太陽のジュース); 2. "Check it! Check it! Train"; 3. "Ren'ai 15 Revolution" (恋愛15シミュレーション); 4. "Sumire" (すみれ); 5. "First Step" (ファーストステップ); 6. "Open Color"; 7. "Manma to Jucchū ni wa Matta Watashi" (まんまと術中にはまったわたし); 8. "Telepathy" (テレパシー); 9. "My Friend"; 10. "Sakura no Hana" (桜の花); 11. "Glass no Kutsu (Nat-chan)" (ガラスのクツ～なっちゃん)	83	—
Zenkai Girl (全開ガール) (as Nanase Hoshii vs the Nanapremes)	2005	Released: March 2, 2005; Label: EMI Music Japan; Format: CD; Track listing: 1. "Kami-sama Korette Koi?" (神様 これって恋?) (Album Size); 2. "Stay With My Heart (Kizuite Kimochi)" (STAY WITH MY HEART～気づいてKIMOCHI～); 3. "Jumpin' Up"; 4. "Zenkai Girl" (全開ガール); 5. "FamiRes Kōsaten" (ファミレス交差点); 6. "Anemone" (アネモネ); 7. "Nana Prix no Ren'ai So! Dance! Radio-7700" (ナナプリの恋愛 SO! DANCE! RADIO-7700); 8. "Fade In" (フェードイン); 9. "No No Shut Out!" (NO NO シャットアウト!); 10. "Love Letter"; 11. "Suki Desu" (好きです); 12. "Ren'ai 15 Revolution" (恋愛15シミュレーション) (Moshiwake Sweet ×3 Curry Remix)	257	—
"—" denotes releases that did not chart or were not released in that region.

=== Compilation albums ===
Title	Year	Details	Peak chart positions	Sales
Title	Year	Details	JPN	Sales
Nanase wa Boku no Takaramono: Single + DVD Best Album (ななせは僕の宝物～シングル+DVDベスト・アルバム～)	2005	Released: December 7, 2005; Label: EMI Music Japan; Format: CD; Track listing: 1. "Glass no Kutsu (Nat-chan)" (ガラスのクツ～なっちゃん); 2. "Nana Prix no Ren'ai So! Dance! Radio-7700" (ナナプリの恋愛 SO! DANCE! RADIO-7700); 3. "Fade In" (フェードイン); 4. "Open Color"; 5. "Suki Desu" (好きです); 6. "No No Shut Out!" (NO NO シャットアウト!); 7. "Anemone" (アネモネ); 8. "My Friend"; 9. "Telepathy" (テレパシー); 10. "Manma to Jucchū ni wa Matta Watashi" (まんまと術中にはまったわたし); 11. "Stay With My Heart (Kizuite Kimochi)" (STAY WITH MY HEART～気づいてKIMOCHI～); 12. "Kami-sama Korette Koi?" (神様 これって恋?) (Album Size); 13. "Ren'ai 15 Revolution" (恋愛15シミュレーション); 14. "First Step" (ファーストステップ)	—	—
"—" denotes releases that did not chart or were not released in that region.

=== Singles ===
Title	Year	Peak chart positions	Sales	Album
Title	Year	JPN	Sales	Album
"Glass no Kutsu (Nat-chan)" (ガラスのクツ～なっちゃん) (as Nat-chan)	2003	26	—	Sakura no Hana
"Ren'ai 15 Revolution" (恋愛15シミュレーション)	2003	19	—	Sakura no Hana
"Open Color"	2004	44	—	Sakura no Hana
"Kami-sama Korette Koi?" (神様 これって恋?)	2004	55	—	Zenkai Girl
"Stay With My Heart (Kizuite Kimochi)" (STAY WITH MY HEART～気づいてKIMOCHI～) (as The Nanapremes feat. Ryo Tanaka)	2005	86	—	Zenkai Girl
"Perma Pavilion" (パーマパビリオン)	2005	91	—	Non-album single
"Nananavigation" (ナナナビゲーション)	2006	98	—	Non-album single
"—" denotes releases that did not chart or were not released in that region.

==== As featured artist ====
Title	Year	Peak chart positions	Sales	Album
Title	Year	JPN	Sales	Album
"3rd X'mas" (feat. Dream, Nao Nagasawa, Sweets, Nanase Hoshii, Aiko Kayō, Paradise Go! Go!, and Michi Saito)	2005	62	—	Girl's Box: Best Hits Compilation Winter
"—" denotes releases that did not chart or were not released in that region.

=== DVD ===
==== Music videos ====
Year	Title	Notes
2004	"Nana Music Tour"	
2005	"Fantastic Cafe"	

==== Image videos ====
Year	Title	Notes
2004	"Nanairo no Kisetsu"	

== Filmography ==
=== TV series ===
Year	Title	Role	Network	Notes
2004	Nōka no Yome ni Naritai	Kana Yoshikawa	NHK	
2004	I'm Home	Subaru Kiyohara	NHK	
2005	Girl's Box	Mirai Morita	BS-TBS	
2006	Satsujin Stunt	Hitmo Takamizawa	TV Asahi	
2006	Shin Momotarō Samurai	Omatsu	TV Asahi	
2006	An Automaton in Long Sleep	Rena Hanayama	TBS	
2006	Kōmyō ga Tsuji	Mitsu	NHK	Taiga drama
2007	Eien no 1.8-byō	Haruka Kobayashi	Fuji TV	
2007	Operation Love	Misa Nagase	Fuji TV	Episode 4
2007	Life	Tomoko Hirose	Fuji TV	
2007	Oishī Gohan Kamakura Kasugai Komemise	Shizuku Sawano	TV Asahi	
2008	Otokomae!	Ohikaru	NHK	Episode 1
2008	Kimi Hannin Janai yo ne?	Sanwa Kiyohara	TV Asahi	Episode 3
2008	Boku no Shima/Kanojo no Sango	Natsumi Oshiro	NHK	
2008	Rookies	Ayako Matsunaga	TBS	Episode 6
2008	Tsujitsuma	Aoi Komoto	TV Asahi	
2008	Keishichō Sōsaikka 9 Kakari	Sakura Mihara	TV Asahi	Episode 10
2008	Taiyo to Umi no Kyoshitsu	Mai	Fuji TV	Episode 4
2009	Mei-chan no Shitsuji	Natsumi Nakamoto	Fuji TV	
2009	Skip!: Shōten Machi ga Unda Idol	Hiromi "Hirotsupi" Takahara	NHK Yamagata	
2014	First Class	Erena manager	Fuji TV	

=== Anime ===
Year	Title	Role	Network	Notes
2009	The Beast Player Erin	Erin	NHK E	Lead role

=== Films ===
Year	Title	Role	Notes
2005	Fly, Daddy, Fly	Haruka Suzuki	
2006	Shimusonzu	Fumie Hayashida	
2006	Mizuchi	Yumi Nagisa	
2006	GoGo Sentai Boukenger The Movie: The Greatest Precious	Muse	
2008	Girl's Box	Nana	
2008	Twilight Syndrome	Chikako	

=== Radio series ===
Year	Title	Network	Notes
2003	Nanase Hoshii Renai Simulation	NCB	
2004	Menikon Monthly Magazine	FM Aichi	
2008	Nanase Hoshii Soft Cream Nose Chotto Ōme de!	NCB	

=== Advertisements ===
Year	Title	Notes
2003	Suntory Natchan	
2003	Menicon	
