= Tokyo Girls' Style =

Japanese girl group

Tokyo Girls' Style; 東京女子流
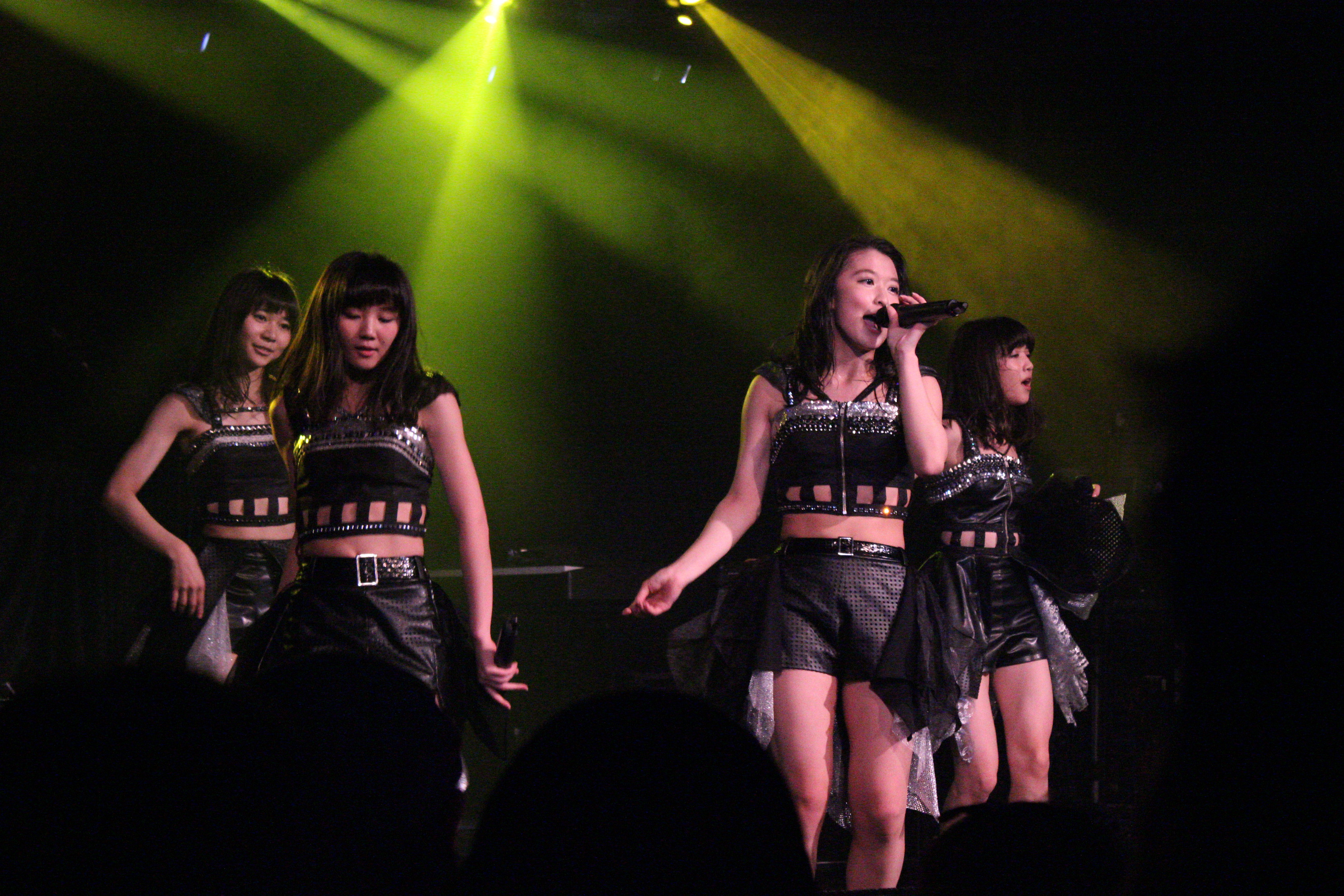
- TOKYO GIRLS' STYLE at HYPER JAPAN (2015)

Background information
- Origin: Tokyo, Japan
- Genres: J-Pop, Electronic dance music, Future bass, Tropical house
- Years active: 2010–2026
- Label: Avex Trax
- Members: Miyu Yamabe; Yuri Nakae; Mei Shoji; Hitomi Arai
- Past members: Ayano Konishi
- Website: tokyogirlsstyle.jp

Tokyo Girls' Style (東京女子流, Tōkyō Joshi Ryū) (stylized as TOKYO GIRLS' STYLE) was a Japanese girl group formed in 2009, and was the first idol group created under Avex Trax after SweetS. The idol group originally consisted of five members: Miyu Yamabe, Hitomi Arai, Yuri Nakae, Ayano Konishi, and Mei Shoji. In December 2015, Konishi left the group and the entertainment industry.

In April 2015, the group attempted to rebrand itself as a serious post-idol artist, though they later performed at the Tokyo Idol Festival in 2017.

After celebrating its 15th anniversary, the group announced it would disband on March 31, 2026.

== History ==
=== Debut and idol career ===
Avex created the group Tokyo Girls' Style in 2009 to capitalize on the rising demand for Japanese idol girl groups, a trend fueled by the success of AKB48. Members of the group later said that they had previously worked with the record label and were encouraged to audition for the new group. On December 1, 2009, the Japanese media began reporting about this new group, but Avex kept the identities of the group members a secret until January 1, 2010. Between January 1 and 5, Avex gradually released more information and launched the group's official website.

The group's debut single, "Kirari" (キラリ☆, lit. "Sparkling"), was released on May 5, 2010, and peaked at No. 30 on the Oricon charts. Their second single, "Onnaji Kimochi" (おんなじキモチ, "Same Feeling"), was released on May19. Their first album, Kodou no Himitsu, which compiled their previous singles, was released in Japan on May 4, 2011, and peaked at No. 25 on the Oricon charts.

In order to break into other Asian markets, Tokyo Girls' Style re-recorded "Onnaji Kimochi" in Mandarin Chinese. This version of the song was included in the album entitled 心跳的秘密 (Xīntiào de mìmì), which was released in Taiwan on May 4, 2011, and in Hong Kong one week later. The group admitted that "they were worried that their singing is not good because the Chinese pronunciation is so hard [to grasp]." Since then, the group has released more albums in these two markets as well as releasing a Chinese-language official site. In 2012, they made their debut performance in Singapore.

Tokyo Girls' Style's 11th single, "ROAD TO BUDOKAN 2012: Bad Flower", was released on October 17, 2012, and became their first single to debut on the Oricon TOP10 charts, at No. 4. They had their first solo performance at Nippon Budokan on December 22, 2012, becoming the youngest female group to perform at this venue.

In 2014, the group starred in two films, Count Five To Dream Of You (directed by Yūki Yamato) and Kotodama – Spiritual Curse, the latter part of a Japanese horror movie series. Their first US performance took place at the 2014 J-Pop Summit festival in San Francisco.

=== Post-idol career ===
On January 6, 2015, the group announced that it would cease to be an idol group from April 2015 onward. They released their last single as an idol group, "Stay with Me", on March 3, 2015.

The group celebrated the fifth anniversary of their debut with the release of the compilation album 1st BEST ALBUM Kirari☆. They released their first post-idol single, "Never Ever", a month later on June 24, 2015. The title track was selected as the ending theme for the anime Fairy Tail. Before its release, member Konishi Ayano announced that she would be taking an indefinite leave of absence to focus on treatment for her lower back pain. Tokyo Girls' Style promoted itself as a four-member group as they proceeded to release their fifth album, Reflection, on December 23 of that year.

A week later on December 30, 2015, Konishi Ayano announced her retirement from the music business, citing ongoing health concerns which she felt left her unable to fulfill her duties as a performer. The group has continued on as four members.

On August 5, 2017, the group made their first appearance at the Tokyo Idol Festival in over three years despite their previous announcement that they would cease all idol activities. The girls relayed that they wanted to broaden the scope of their activities and wished to "be regarded as both an idol and an artist". On October 25, 2017, the group simultaneously released two mini-albums: PERIOD.BEST ~Otona ni Narun Dakara~, which featured re-recordings of their previous idol hits, and PERIOD.BEST ~Kimete Ii yo Watashi no Koto~, which featured singles released in 2016 and 2017.

On May 3, 2025, the group announced it would disband with a final concert on March 31, 2026, at Zepp DiverCity.

== Members ==
=== Current members ===
- Miyu Yamabe (山邊 未夢)
- Hitomi Arai (新井ひとみ) – (Sub-Leader)
- Yuri Nakae (中江 友梨)
- Mei Shoji (庄司 芽生) – (Leader)

=== Former members ===
- Konishi Ayano (小西 彩乃)

== Discography ==
=== Albums ===
No.	Title	Release date	Oricon peak position
1	Kodou no Himitsu (鼓動の秘密)	May 4, 2011	25
2	Limited addiction	March 14, 2012	25
3	Yakusoku (約束)	January 30, 2013	13
4	Killing Me Softly	June 4, 2014	23
5	Reflection	December 23, 2015	41
6	Nocturnal	August 3, 2022	25
7	Tokyo Girls' Style (東京女子流)	July 30, 2025	39

=== Extended plays ===
No.	Title	Release date	Oricon peak position
1	Tokyo Girls Journey	May 5, 2020	7

=== Compilations ===
No.	Title	Release date	Oricon peak position
1	1st BEST ALBUM「Kirari☆」 (1st BEST ALBUM「キラリ☆」)	May 5, 2015	15
2	PERIOD.BEST ~Otona ni Narun Dakara~ (PERIOD.BEST ～オトナニナルンダカラ～)	October 25, 2017	54
3	PERIOD.BEST ~Kimete Ii yo Watashi no Koto~ (PERIOD.BEST ～キメテイイヨワタシノコト～)	October 25, 2017	56

=== Singles ===
No.	Title	Release date	Oricon peak position
1	"Kirari☆" (キラリ☆)	May 5, 2010	30
2	"Onnaji Kimochi" (おんなじキモチ)	May 19, 2010	30
3	"Ganbatte Itsudatte Shinjiteru" (頑張って いつだって 信じてる)	July 21, 2010	31
4	"Himawari to Hoshikuzu / Kitto Wasurenai..." (ヒマワリと星屑 / きっと 忘れない、、、)	October 6, 2010	19
5	"Love Like Candy Floss"	February 9, 2011	20
6	"Kodō no Himitsu / Sayonara, Arigatō" (鼓動の秘密 / サヨナラ、ありがとう。)	May 18, 2011	24
7	"Limited Addiction / We Will Win! －Kokoro no baton po・pon no po~n☆－" (Limited Addiction / We Will Win! －ココロのバトンでポ・ポンのポ～ン☆－)	August 24, 2011	11
8	"Liar / W.M.A.D."	November 23, 2011	18
9	"Rock you! / Onnaji Kimochi -YMCK REMIX-" (Rock you! / おんなじキモチ)	March 7, 2012	16
10	"Tsuioku -Single Version- / Taisetsu na Kotoba" (追憶 -Single Version- / 大切な言葉)	May 23, 2012	12
11	"Road to Budokan 2012 ~Bad Flower~"	October 17, 2012	4
12	"Unmei / Wonderful Smile" (運命 / ワンダフル スマイル)	June 5, 2013	6
13	"Get The Star / Last Forever"	September 25, 2013	4
14	"Road to Budokan 2013 ~Chiisana Kiseki~" (ROAD TO BUDOKAN 2013 〜小さな奇跡〜)	November 22, 2013	16
15	"Partition Love"	February 12, 2014	9
16	"Jūjika: Eiga Gakkō no Kaidan Noroi no Kotodama Ver.〜" (十字架 〜映画「学校の怪談 -呪いの言霊-」 Ver.〜)	May 21, 2014	11
17	"Say Long Goodbye" (Say long goodbye/ヒマワリと星屑 -English Version-")	December 10, 2014	8
18	"Stay with me"	March 11, 2015	7
19	"Never ever"	June 24, 2015	23
20	"Shinkai" (深海)	August 31, 2016	38
21	"Mille-feuille" (ミルフィーユ)	November 30, 2016	33
22	"predawn / Don't give it up"	March 1, 2017	22
23	"Water Lily ~Suiren~" (water lily ～睡蓮～)	July 5, 2017	17
24	"Last Romance" (ラストロマンス)	February 28, 2018	29
25	"Kiss wa Agenai" (kissはあげない)	June 20, 2018	26
26	"Hikaru yo / Reborn" (光るよ/Reborn)	February 27, 2019	25
27	"Hello, Goodbye"	February 10, 2021	22

=== Digital singles ===
No.	Title	Release date
1	"Boku no Tegami" (僕の手紙)	August 10, 2011
2	"LolitA☆Strawberry in summer"	August 1, 2012
3	"Partition Love"	September 25, 2013
