= Nishi-naga-iwa Glacier =

Glacier in Antarctica

- Location of Queen Maud Land in Antarctica

- Location within Antarctica
- Location: Queen Maud Land
- Coordinates: 68°31′S 41°18′E
- Thickness: unknown
- Status: unknown

Nishi-naga-iwa Glacier (68°31′S 41°18′E) is a glacier flowing to the sea between Daruma Rock and Cape Akarui in Queen Maud Land. Mapped from surveys and air photos by Japanese Antarctic Research Expedition (JARE), 1957–62, and, in association with Higashi-naga-iwa Glacier lying 5 nautical miles (9 km) eastward, named Nishi-naga-iwa-hyoga (western long rock glacier).

== See also ==
- List of glaciers in the Antarctic
- Glaciology
