= Omega Glacier =

Glacier in Antarctica

- Location of Queen Maud Land in Antarctica

- Location within Antarctica
- Location: Queen Maud Land
- Coordinates: 68°37′S 41°1′E
- Thickness: unknown
- Status: unknown

Omega Glacier (68°37′S 41°1′E) is a glacier flowing to the coast just south of Cape Omega in Queen Maud Land. Mapped from surveys and air photos by Japanese Antarctic Research Expedition (JARE), 1957–62, who gave the name.

== See also ==
- Glaciology
- Kingyo Rock, large linear rock at the south side of Omega Glacier
- List of glaciers in the Antarctic
