= Takkoku!!! =

Japanese manga series

- First tankōbon volume cover

タッコク!!!
- Genre: Sports
- Manga
- Written by: Tsubasa Fukuchi
- Published by: Shogakukan
- Imprint: Shōnen Sunday Comics
- Magazine: Shōnen Sunday Super
- Original run: March 25, 2009 – January 25, 2011
- Volumes: 6
- icon

Takkoku!!! (タッコク!!!) is a Japanese manga series written and illustrated by Tsubasa Fukuchi. It was serialized in Shogakukan's Shōnen Sunday Super from March 2009 to January 2011. Its chapters were collected in six tankōbon volumes.

== Publication ==
Written and illustrated by Tsubasa Fukuchi, Takkoku!!! was first published as a one-shot in Shogakukan's shōnen manga magazine Weekly Shōnen Sunday on February 27, 2008. It was later serialized in Shogakukan's Shōnen Sunday Super from March 25, 2009, to January 25, 2011. Shogakukan collected its chapters in six tankōbon volumes, released from September 17, 2009, to April 18, 2011.

=== Volumes ===
No.	Japanese release date	Japanese ISBN
1	September 17, 2009	978-4-09-121756-1
2	January 18, 2010	978-4-09-121756-1
3	May 18, 2010	978-4-09-122317-3
4	September 17, 2010	978-4-09-122536-8
5	January 18, 2011	978-4-09-122776-8
6	April 18, 2011	978-4-09-122867-3
