= The Law of Ueki =

Japanese manga series

- First tankōbon volume cover, featuring Kosuke Ueki (center) and Ai Mori (left)

うえきの法則 (Ueki no Hōsoku)
- Genre: Adventure; Fantasy comedy; Supernatural
- Manga
- Written by: Tsubasa Fukuchi
- Published by: Shogakukan
- English publisher: NA: Viz Media
- Imprint: Shōnen Sunday Comics
- Magazine: Weekly Shōnen Sunday
- Original run: July 25, 2001 – October 13, 2004
- Volumes: 16
- Anime television series
- Directed by: Hiroshi Watanabe
- Written by: Toshifumi Kawase
- Music by: Akifumi Tada
- Studio: Studio Deen
- Licensed by: NA: Discotek Media
- Original network: TV Tokyo
- English network: SEA: Animax Asia; US: ImaginAsian TV
- Original run: April 4, 2005 – March 27, 2006
- Episodes: 51
- Manga

The Law of Ueki Plus
- Written by: Tsubasa Fukuchi
- Published by: Shogakukan
- Imprint: Shōnen Sunday Comics
- Magazine: Weekly Shōnen Sunday
- Original run: April 6, 2005 – June 20, 2007
- Volumes: 5
- icon

The Law of Ueki (Japanese: うえきの法則, Hepburn: Ueki no Hōsoku) is a Japanese manga series written and illustrated by Tsubasa Fukuchi. It was serialized in Shogakukan's shōnen manga magazine Weekly Shōnen Sunday from July 2001 to October 2004, with its chapters collected in 16 tankōbon volumes. A sequel, The Law of Ueki Plus, was serialized in the same magazine from April 2005 to June 2007, with its chapters collected in five tankōbon volumes. The Law of Ueki was licensed in North America by Viz Media.

A 51-episode anime television series adaptation produced by Studio Deen was broadcast on TV Tokyo from April 2005 to March 2006. In North America, the series was first licensed by Geneon in 2005 and later by Discotek Media in 2018.

== Plot ==
The story starts out with the Battle of the Supernatural Powers, a tournament to decide which Celestial (heavenly being in the original Japanese version) will be the next King of the Celestial World (God in the Japanese version).

Each of the 100 King Candidates (God Candidates in the Japanese version) is required to choose a junior high school student to act as their power user. The student is given a unique power and told to eliminate as many enemies as possible. The winning King Candidate will become the new King of the Celestial World and the winning student will receive the Blank Talent (Black Zai in the Japanese version), a talent that can be anything they choose.

While this leads many students to thoughts of greed and selfishness, Kosuke Ueki decides to take it upon himself to win this tournament to keep that power away from those that would abuse such a gift.

=== The Law of Ueki Plus ===
Two years after the tournament in The Law of Ueki, Kosuke Ueki is now a 3rd year student in Hinokuni Junior High School. For some reason, everyone in the real world has lost their memory of their most important person, including his friends who participated in the tournament two years ago. Ueki is the only one unaffected, and is fighting in order to restore everyone's memories. He follows a little sheep named U-lu to another world called Hangekai where he meets new companions and gains new abilities.

== Media ==
=== Manga ===
Written and illustrated by Tsubasa Fukuchi, The Law of Ueki was serialized in Shogakukan's Weekly Shōnen Sunday from July 25, 2001, (Note: The series started in the magazine's 34th issue of 2001 (cover date August 8), released on July 25 of the same year.) to October 13, 2004. (Note: The series finished in the magazine's 46th issue of 2004 (cover date October 27), released on October 13 of the same year.) Shogakukan collected its 154 individual chapters in 16 tankōbon volumes, released from December 18, 2001, to January 14, 2005.

In North America, the manga was licensed for English release by Viz Media in 2005. The sixteen volumes were published from August 8, 2006, to February 10, 2009.

A sequel, The Law of Ueki Plus (うえきの法則プラス, Ueki no Hōsoku Purasu), was serialized in Weekly Shōnen Sunday from April 6, 2005, to June 20, 2007. (Note: The 2007–29th issue of the magazine (cover date July 4) was published on June 20, 2007.) Its 46 individual chapters were collected in five tankōbon volumes, released from August 8, 2005, to September 18, 2007. A special one-shot chapter, on the occasion of the 65th anniversary of Weekly Shōnen Sunday, titled "The Law of Ueki – Exhibition" (うえきの法則エキシビション, Ueki no Hōsoku Ekishibishon), was published in the magazine on December 4, 2024.

=== Anime ===
A 51-episode anime television series adaptation by Studio Deen was broadcast on TV Tokyo from April 4, 2005, to March 27, 2006. The series was directed by Hiroshi Watanabe, with series composition by Toshifumi Kawase and music by Akifumi Tada. Avex collected the series on seventeen DVDs. Episodes 1–27 were released on nine volumes from August 10, 2005, to April 12, 2006. Episodes 28–51 were released on eight volumes from May 10 to December 13, 2006. The first opening theme for episodes 1–32 is "Falco" by Hitomi Shimatani, and the second opening theme for episodes 33–51 is "No Regret" by Kumi Koda. The first ending theme for episodes 1–15 is "Kokoro no Wakusei (Little Planets)" (こころの惑星〜Little planets〜) by Aiko Kayo. The second ending theme for episodes 16–32 is "Earthship: Uchūsen Chikyūgō" (Earthship 〜宇宙船地球号〜) by SweetS. The third ending theme for episodes 33–42 is "Kono Machi de wa Dare Mo ga Mina Jibun Igai no Nani Ka ni Narita garu" (この街では誰もがみな自分以外の何かになりたがる) by The Ivory Brothers. The fourth ending theme for episodes 43–50 is "Bokutachi ni Aru Mono" (ボクたちにあるもの) by Romi Park. The ending theme for episode 51 is "True Blue" by Hitomi Shimatani.

In North America, the series was first licensed by Geneon Entertainment. Geneon released the first 36 episodes of the series on nine DVDs from May 16, 2006, to September 18, 2007. In Southeast Asia, the series was broadcast on Animax Asia. The series was broadcast in the United States on ImaginAsian TV's Anime EnerG programming block starting on January 30, 2007. On July 3, 2008, Geneon and Funimation announced an agreement to distribute select titles in North America. While Geneon would still retain the license, Funimation would assume exclusive rights to the manufacturing, marketing, sales and distribution of select titles. The Law of Ueki was one of several titles involved in the deal. Funimation released the entire series on a DVD box set on June 9, 2009. The rights to the series expired in 2011. In May 2018, Discotek Media announced the acquisition of the series. It was released on Blu-ray Disc on July 31, 2018. The series was added to Crunchyroll's catalog in May 2021.

=== Video games ===
A video game published by Bandai, titled Ueki no Hōsoku: Taosu ze Roberuto Jūdan!! (うえきの法則 倒すぜ ロベルト十団!!; "The Law of Ueki: I'll Beat You, Robert's Ten!!), was released for the PlayStation 2 on January 26, 2006. Another video game published by Banpresto, titled Ueki no Hōsoku: Jingi Sakuretsu! Nōryoku-sha Batoru (うえきの法則 神器炸裂! 能力者バトル; "The Law of Ueki: Sacred Weapon Explosion! – Power User Battle), was released for the Game Boy Advance on March 2, 2006.

== Reception ==
=== Manga ===
Luke Carroll of Anime News Network ranked the first volume as B−. Carroll lauded the concept of Ueki's power to turn trash into trees and the humor of the series, but called it "another run of the mill shounen title". He labeled Fukuchi's art style as "simple" and compared it to One Piece, as "there is vagueness in a lot of detail", but clarified that it is suited to the comedic tone of the story. Michael Aronson of Manga Life ranked the first volume as C+. He criticized the series for its similar premise to other action manga series and for its "overly hyperactive" characters. Aronson concluded; "fans of hyper action series like One Piece and Dragon Ball will feel at home here. Anyone else will merely glaze over and out." Patti Martinson of Sequential Tart gave the fourth volume a score of 4/10. Martinson compared the content of the volume to the anime adaptation, and wrote; "at times the manga made less sense than the DVD did. However, the characterizations seem to be slightly better, but not enough to make me see what happens in the next volume."

=== Anime ===
In TV Asahi's 2006 poll of the Top 100 Anime, The Law of Ueki came in 27th. Carlo Santos from Anime News Network criticized the series for its "run-of-the-mill" plot and "ridiculous" characters, calling them "underdeveloped", but stated that the series is "[b]izarre and crazy enough to be entertaining at times". Santos also criticized its "sloppy" artwork, repetitive fights and the English dub, concluding: "Like its titular hero, The Law of Ueki seems energetic and full of promise, but right now lacks the necessary self-control to succeed." Chris Beveridge of AnimeOnDVD commented that the series "is a real hard sell", commenting that the characters are hard to connect with, the pacing of the first episodes is very fast and its plot is "something that we've seen in its most base form a million times now". Beveridge also criticized the series' artwork, which blends traditional and digital animation, calling it "disconnected at times" and that it makes it look like an "unfinished show". Jeremy Mullin of IGN compared the premise of the series to Zatch Bell! and commented that the powers of the characters are similar to those from Fullmetal Alchemist, "with the conversion factor involved", highlighting as well the variety of ways in which they are used. Mullin concluded: "The Law of Ueki was something I was interested in checking out, and it seems to be worth it. It's full of some good ol' fashioned anime craziness with some positive messages thrown in for good measure."
