= Kingyo (group) =

Japanese pop band

Kingyo 金魚
- Origin: Japan
- Genres: J-pop
- Years active: 2007–2008
- Labels: Avex Trax
- Past members: Yu Hasebe; Aiko Kayō; Nao Nagasawa
- Website: avex.jp/kingyo/index.html

Kingyo (金魚) was a Japanese project group consisting of former Dream member Yu Hasebe and soloists Aiko Kayō and Nao Nagasawa. Their debut single was released on July 11, 2007, and served as the ending theme to Girl's Box the Movie.

== Members ==
- Yu Hasebe
- Nao Nagasawa
- Aiko Kayo

== Discography ==
=== Singles ===
Title	Year	Peak chart positions	Sales	Album
Title	Year	JPN	Sales	Album
"Lovers High"	2007	60	—	Non-album single
"—" denotes releases that did not chart or were not released in that region.
