= Kotodama – Spiritual Curse =

- Poster

Japanese name
- Kanji: 学校の怪談 呪いの言霊
Transcriptions
- Revised Hepburn: Gakkō no Kaidan Noroi no Kotodama
- Directed by: Masayuki Ochiai
- Screenplay by: Masayuki Ochiai
- Based on: Gakkō no Kaidan
- Starring: Ayano Konishi; Miyu Yamabe; Hitomi Arai; Yuri Nakae; Mei Shōji
- Release date: May 23, 2014 (Japan)
- Running time: 105 minutes
- Country: Japan
- Language: Japanese

Kotodama – Spiritual Curse (Japanese: 学校の怪談 呪いの言霊, Hepburn: Gakkō no Kaidan Noroi no Kotodama) is a 2014 Japanese school horror film written and directed by Masayuki Ochiai and based on Gakkō no Kaidan. The main cast includes the five members of the Japanese idol girl group Tokyo Girls' Style. The film was released on May 23, 2014.

== Cast ==
- Ayano Konishi
- Miyu Yamabe
- Hitomi Arai
- Yuri Nakae
- Mei Shōji
- Shōno Ayama
- Kai Inowaki
- Tatsuya Kuroki
- Kouhei Takeda

== Music ==
The theme song is by Tokyo Girls' Style.

== See also ==
- School Ghost Stories
