= Ponkotsu-chan Kenshōchū =

Japanese manga series

- Cover of the first volume

ポンコツちゃん検証中
- Genre: Romantic comedy
- Manga
- Written by: Tsubasa Fukuchi
- Published by: Shogakukan
- Imprint: Shōnen Sunday Comics
- Magazine: Weekly Shōnen Sunday
- Original run: April 24, 2019 – July 21, 2021
- Volumes: 10
- icon

Ponkotsu-chan Kenshōchū (ポンコツちゃん検証中; lit. 'Miss Clumsy Currently Under Inspection') is a Japanese manga series written and illustrated by Tsubasa Fukuchi. It was serialized in Shogakukan's Weekly Shōnen Sunday from April 2019 to July 2021.

== Publication ==
Ponkotsu-chan Kenshōchū, written and illustrated by Tsubasa Fukuchi, was serialized in Shogakukan's Weekly Shōnen Sunday from April 24, 2019, to July 21, 2021. Shogakukan collected its chapters into ten tankōbon volumes, released from September 18, 2019, to August 18, 2021.

=== Volume list ===
No.	Japanese release date	Japanese ISBN
1	September 18, 2019	978-4-09-129327-5
2	November 18, 2019	978-4-09-129439-5
3	January 17, 2020	978-4-09-129548-4
4	April 16, 2020	978-4-09-850067-3
5	July 17, 2020	978-4-09-850165-6
6	October 16, 2020	978-4-09-850272-1
7	January 18, 2021	978-4-09-850383-4
8	April 16, 2021	978-4-09-850517-3
9	July 16, 2021	978-4-09-850630-9
10	August 18, 2021	978-4-09-850688-0

== Reception ==
In 2020, the manga was one of the 50 nominees for the sixth Next Manga Awards.
