= Bingo (2012 film) =

- Directed by: Yōhei Fukuda
- Starring: Kazuki Shimizu; Sakiko Matsui
- Release date: September 22, 2012 (Japan)
- Running time: 99 minutes
- Country: Japan
- Language: Japanese

Bingo (ビンゴ) is a 2012 Japanese horror film directed by Yōhei Fukuda.

== Cast ==
- Kazuki Shimizu as Masaya
- Sakiko Matsui as Mayumi
