= Cape Omega =

Cape Omega (68°34′S 40°59′E) is a prominent rock cape between Omega Glacier and Daruma Rock on the coast of Queen Maud Land. Mapped from surveys and air photos by Japanese Antarctic Research Expedition (JARE), 1957–1962, who gave the name.
