= Parashoppers =

Japanese manga series

- First tankōbon volume cover

パラショッパーズ (Parashoppāzu)
- Genre: Action; Supernatural
- Manga
- Written by: Tsubasa Fukuchi
- Published by: Shogakukan
- English publisher: NA: Viz Media
- Imprint: Shōnen Sunday Comics
- Magazine: Weekly Shōnen Sunday
- Original run: January 22, 2025 – present
- Volumes: 7
- icon

Parashoppers (Japanese: パラショッパーズ, Hepburn: Parashoppāzu) is a Japanese manga series written and illustrated by Tsubasa Fukuchi. It began serialization in Shogakukan's shōnen manga magazine Weekly Shōnen Sunday in January 2025.

== Plot ==
Amaragi Mitsusada is a student who tries to find the positives in everything including negative situations. One day while returning from school, he suddenly noticed a new application on his phone called Parashop. He gets a message telling him that he can buy one power from the app and that he will have to fight other people who have superpowers. Although at first glance his chosen power seems weak and ridiculous, with skillful use and clever management he always finds a way to turn the situation to his advantage. After that, he makes new friends who are in the same situation and have a common goal: to discover what is hidden behind that mysterious application.

== Publication ==
Written and illustrated by Tsubasa Fukuchi, Parashoppers began serialization in Shogakukan's shōnen manga magazine Weekly Shōnen Sunday on January 22, 2025. Its chapters have been collected into seven tankōbon volumes as of November 2026.

The series' chapters are simultaneously published in English on Viz Media's Viz Manga app.

No.	Release date	ISBN
1	May 16, 2025	978-4-09-854117-1
1. "Mitsusada Amaragi Sees the Bright Side" (天良木光定は肯定する, Amaragi Mitsusada wa Kōteisuru); 2. "Yatagarasu Zen" (八咫烏のゼン, Yatagarasu no Zen); 3. "Straw and Fire" (藁と火, Wara to Hi); 4. "Raise the Value!" (価値を上げろ, Kachi o Agero); 5. "Rio Onizuka" (鬼塚莉央, Onizuka Rio); 6. "The Hattori Brothers" (服部兄弟(ブラザーズ), Hattori Burazāzu); 7. "Parashoppers" (パラショッパーズ, Parashoppāzu)
2	August 18, 2025	978-4-09-854211-6
8. "Team Up? Or Not?" (組む？組まない？, Kumu? Kumanai?); 9. "Kaoru Saito" (斎藤馨, Saitō Kaoru); 10. "Hammer of Dead Spirits" (死霊の槌, Shiryō no Tsuchi); 11. "Tower of Babel Death Macho" (バベルズタワーデスマッチョ, Baberuzu Tawā Desu Matcho); 12. "The Sage's Rope" (賢者のロープ, Kenja no Rōpu); 13. "Qualification" (資格, Shikaku); 14. "Climber, Climber" (クライマークライマー, Kuraimā Kuraimā); 15. "The Killing Blow" (決定打, Ketteida); 16. "No Mere Game" (ゲームなんかじゃない, Gēmu Nanka ja Nai)
3	November 18, 2025	978-4-09-854330-4
17. "Awards and Choices" (褒賞と選択, Hōshō to Sentaku); 18. "Department Store Z" (Z(ゼット)デパート, Zetto Depāto); 19. "So Many Z" (いっぱいいるZ(ゼット), Ippai Iru Zetto); 20. "Pao Hekiyama" (碧山羽凰, Hekiyama Pao); 21. "To the Other Building!" (別館へ行こう, Bekkan e Ikō); 22. "The Pied Piper of Hamelin" (ハーメルンの笛吹き, Hāmerun no Fuefuki); 23. "Hell or High Water" (鬼が出るか蛇が出るか, Oni ga Deru ka, Ja ga Deru ka); 24. "Saito-chan" (斎藤ちゃん, Saitō-chan); 25. "Goto" (後藤, Gotō); 26. "Message Received" (わかってるっス, Wakatterussu)
4	February 18, 2026	978-4-09-854451-6
27. "Onizuka and Hekiyama" (鬼塚と碧山, Onizuka to Hekiyama); 28. "Eyes Only For Me" (俺だけを見ろ, Ore dake o Miro); 29. "The Ant and the Elephant" (蟻と象, Ari to Zō); 30. "Specialist" (専門家, Senmonka); 31. "Scramble" (争奪戦, Sōdatsusen); 32. "Who Will Remain?" (誰が残る？, Dare ga Nokoru?); 33. "Not Alone" (孤独じゃない, Kodoku ja Nai); 34. "Interspecies Horse Racing" (異種競馬, Ishu Keiba); 35. "Job Offer" (仕事依頼, Shigoto Irai)
5	May 18, 2026	978-4-09-854584-1
36. "Lawless Zone" (無法地帯, Muhō Chitai); 37. "Infomercials Are Tricky" (インフォマーシャルは難しい, Infomāsharu wa Muzukashii); 38. "Onizuka vs. Rice" (鬼塚vs.お米, Onizuka vs. O-kome); 39. "The Executive Producer" (制作総指揮の男, Seisaku Sōshiki no Otoko); 40. "Death Horse" (デスホース, Desu Hōsu); 41. "Tsukuru Shirokane" (白金創, Shirokane Tsukuru); 42. "Board Game Island" (双六島, Sugoroku-tō); 43. "The Werewolf Makes a Move" (動き出した人狼, Ugokidashita Jinrō); 44. "One of These Players" (この中にいる, Kono Naka ni Iru)
6	August 18, 2026	978-4-09-854744-9
7	November 18, 2026	978-4-09-855007-4

=== Chapters not yet in tankōbon format ===
45. "Day Trader" (デイトレーダー, Dei Torēdā)
46. "The Werewolf's Identity" (人狼の正体, Jinrō no Shōtai)
47. "Crossing the Chasm" (向こう岸へ渡れ, Mukōgishi e Watare)
48. "Too Much Up to Luck" (運ゲーが過ぎんだろ, Ungē ga Sugin daro)
49. "Hidden Command" (隠しコマンド, Kakushi Komando)
50. "The Date" (デート, Dēto)
51. "Six Prizes" (6つの褒賞, 6-tsu no Hōshō)
52. "Shot to the Heart" (ハートを撃ち抜け, Hāto o Uchinuke)
53. "Halfway People" (途中のひと, Tochū no Hito)
54. "Two Wheels" (両輪, Ryōrin)
55. "Fish Heaven" (おさかな天国, O-sakana Tengoku)
56. "Gain" (得, Toku)
57. "The Most Dangerous Opponent" (最も危険な敵, Mottomo Kiken na Teki)
58. "Tsukuru Shirokane and the Three Senior Citizens" (白金創と三老人, Shirokane Tsukuru to Sanrōjin)
59. "Marionettes" (操る人形, Ayatsuru Ningyō)
60. "Rui Kokuho Goes with the Flow" (国宝類は流される, Kokuhō Rui wa Nagasareru)
61. "Parakkuma Castle" (パラックマ城, Parakkuma-jō)
62. "Sleepy" (眠気, Nemuke)
63. "Explosion" (爆発, Bakuhatsu)
64. "Saito's Job" (斎藤の仕事, Saitō no Shigoto)
65. "Demon King" (魔王, Maō)
66. "Rescue the Princess!" (姫を救え, Hime o Sukue)
67. "The Final Attraction" (最後のアトラクション, Saigo no Atorakushon)
68. "Saionji's Over It" (やめた西園寺, Yameta Saionji)
69. "Production Meeting" (制作会議, Seisaku Kaigi)
70. "Mysterious Power" (不思議な力, Fushigi na Chikara)

== Reception ==
The series was nominated for the eleventh Next Manga Awards in 2025 in the print category; it was ranked fourth in the twelfth edition in 2026.
