= A Day of One Hero =

- DVD cover
- Directed by: Kenichiro Saikai
- Written by: Kenichiro Saikai
- Starring: Kazuki Shimizu; Yoshiyuki Yamaguchi; Nao Nagasawa
- Distributed by: Toei Video
- Release date: November 21, 2011
- Running time: 64 minutes
- Language: Japanese

A Day of One Hero, Starring Kazuki Shimizu (A DAY of one HERO 清水一希 主演, A Day of One Hero Shimizu Kazuki Shuen) is a direct-to-video film released on November 21, 2011 starring Kazuki Shimizu as himself in a mockumentary of his acting career as Don "Doc" Dogoier in the Super Sentai series Kaizoku Sentai Gokaiger. The film also features cameo appearances by Tokusatsu veteran actors Yoshiyuki Yamaguchi and Nao Nagasawa.

== Plot ==
It is a typical day in the life of actor Kazuki Shimizu when a gun is found inside his bag, leading to all sorts of trouble for him.

== Cast ==
- Kazuki Shimizu (清水 一希, Shimizu Kazuki)
- Yoshiyuki Yamaguchi (山口 祥行, Yamaguchi Yoshiyuki)
- Hana Yamanashi
- Ryuga Suda
- Tomohiro Tsuboi (坪井 智浩, Tsuboi Tomohiro)
- Nao Nagasawa (長澤 奈央, Nagasawa Nao)
