= Aiko Kayō =

Aiko Kayō かよう 愛子
- Born: December 11, 1985 (age 40); Kanagawa, Japan
- Genre: J-pop
- Occupation: Singer
- Instruments: Vocals, guitar
- Years active: 2003–present
- Label: Avex Trax
- Member of: Royal Blue
- Formerly of: Girl's Box; Kingyo
- Website: www.fit-fan.co.jp/artist/kayo/index.html

Aiko Kayō (かよう 愛子, Kayō Aiko; born December 11, 1985) is a Japanese singer and actress. She has released 12 singles and 2 albums on the Avex Trax label in Japan. She has also performed with the musical units Kingyo (金魚) and A Girls.

== Release ==
On May 25, 2005, Kayo released her seventh single "Kokoro no Wakusei ~Little Planets~" (こころの惑星). It was released by Avex Trax. "Kokoro no Wakusei ~Little Planets~" was used as the first ending theme for the anime The Law of Ueki. The b-side track is a cover of one of Kylie Minogue's older singles. On July 27, 2005, Kayo released her eighth single, "Kanojo wa Gokigen Naname" (彼女はゴキゲンななめ). It was released by AVEX Records. The song was used as the AT-X Geki Natsu HAPPY! campaign image song. First pressings of the single included a picture label disc and poster.

== Discography ==
=== Studio albums ===
Title	Year	Details	Peak chart positions	Sales
Title	Year	Details	JPN	Sales
Dolce	2006	Released: March 1, 2006; Label: Avex Trax; Format: CD; Track listing: 1. "Hitomi no Naka no Meikyū" (瞳の中の迷宮); 2. "Aishite ne Motto" (愛してね♥もっと); 3. "Fantasy"; 4. "Ienai Kotoba" (いえないコトバ); 5. "Ring! Ring! Ring!"; 6. "Traveller"; 7. "Kokoro no Wakusei (Little Planets)" (こころの惑星 ～Little planets～); 8. "Kanojo wa Gokigen Naname" (彼女はゴキゲンななめ); 9. "Hold On to Love"; 10. "Midori no Kisetsu" (緑の季節); 11. "Sasurai no Tenshi" (さすらいの天使); 12. "Yūgure wa Love Song" (夕暮れはラブ・ソング)	175	—
Pop	2007	Released: June 6, 2007; Label: Avex Trax; Format: CD; Track listing: 1. "Home Made Star (Kayō Aiko no Theme)" (☆HOME MADE STAR☆～嘉陽愛子のテーマ～); 2. "Yūki no Chikara" (勇気のチカラ); 3. "Solitude"; 4. "Orange Road"; 5. "Cosmic Cosmetics"; 6. "Eyes"; 7. "Katagoshi no Koi o Tsunaide" (肩越しの恋をつないで); 8. "Runaway Girl"; 9. "Destiny (Mirai to Iu Na no Monogatari)" (Destiny～未来という名の物語～); 10. "Monday Morning Blue"; 11. "Callin' (Boku o Yobu Koe)" (Callin'～ぼくを呼ぶ声～); 12. "Yakusoku no Ki no Shita de..." (約束の樹の下で...)	140	—
"—" denotes releases that did not chart or were not released in that region.

=== Singles ===
Title	Year	Peak chart positions	Sales	Album
Title	Year	JPN	Sales	Album
"Hitomi no Naka no Meikyū" (瞳の中の迷宮)	2003	22	—	Dolce
"Aishite ne Motto" (愛してね♥もっと)	2004	20	—	Dolce
"Fantasy"	2004	78	—	Dolce
"Ienai Kotoba" (いえないコトバ)	2004	119	—	Dolce
"Ring! Ring! Ring!"	2004	100	—	Dolce
"Traveller"	2004	114	—	Dolce
"Kokoro no Wakusei (Little Planets)" (こころの惑星 ～Little planets～)	2005	102	—	Dolce
"Kanojo wa Gokigen Naname" (彼女はゴキゲンななめ)	2005	93	—	Dolce
"Hold On to Love"	2006	72	—	Dolce
"Home Made Star (Kayō Aiko no Theme)" (☆HOME MADE STAR☆～嘉陽愛子のテーマ～)	2006	90	—	Pop
"Cosmic Cosmetics"	2006	74	—	Pop
"Yūki no Chikara" (勇気のチカラ)	2007	105	—	Pop
"—" denotes releases that did not chart or were not released in that region.

==== As featured artist ====
Title	Year	Peak chart positions	Sales	Album
Title	Year	JPN	Sales	Album
"2nd X'mas" feat. Dream, Sweets, and Aiko Kayō	2004	—	—	Girl's Box: Best Hits Compilation Winter
"3rd X'mas" (feat. Dream, Nao Nagasawa, Sweets, Nanase Hoshii, Aiko Kayō, Paradise Go! Go!, and Michi Saito)	2005	62	—	Girl's Box: Best Hits Compilation Winter
"—" denotes releases that did not chart or were not released in that region.

== Photobooks ==
- Pretty Private, published on November 11, 2004, by Kadokawa Shoten.
