= Psyche Matashitemo =

Japanese manga series

- The cover of volume 1 of the manga, published by Shogakukan

サイケまたしても
- Genre: Drama
- Manga
- Written by: Tsubasa Fukuchi
- Published by: Shogakukan
- Imprint: Shōnen Sunday Comics
- Magazine: Weekly Shōnen Sunday
- Original run: July 9, 2014 – December 26, 2018
- Volumes: 15

Psyche Matashitemo (Japanese: サイケまたしても, Hepburn: Saike Mata Shitemo; lit. 'Once Again, A Psyche') is a Japanese manga series written and illustrated by Tsubasa Fukuchi. It was serialized in Shogakukan's Weekly Shōnen Sunday from July 2014 to December 2018.

== Plot ==
The manga revolves around Saike Kuzushiro, a male middle school student without dreams or motivation. Within his normal everyday life, the only one who dotes on him is his female childhood friend, Mikan Karatachi. However, one day, after seeing Mikan in extreme danger, he gains psychic powers that surpass human knowledge.

== Characters ==
Saike Kuzushiro (葛代斎下, Kuzushiro Saike)
Saike is a junior high school student who gained supernatural powers after drowning in Mogura Pond. When he drowns in that pond, he has the power to rewind time all the way back to the beginning of a day. Initially a pessimist, nihilist and anti-social person, Saike decides to make more out of his life after saving Mikan.
Mikan Karatachi (枸橘蜜柑, Karatachi Mikan)
Mikan is Saike's closest friend and crush. She is a third-year junior high school student who is a member of the art club. After dying by being hit by a truck, she was saved by Saike when he rewound time.
Eiji Hizu (氷頭栄治, Hizu Eiji)
Eiji is Saike's loyal friend, and the first ability-user Saike encountered. He has the power to turn solid objects into Styrofoam.
Yumeo Kuroda (黒田ユメヲ, Kuroda Yumewo)
Yumeo is the boss of the talented hunting group, Negative Rain, a group of special ability holders who erase the powers of people who use them for evil. He has the power to erase other peoples' abilities, but only if they agree with it.

== Publication ==
Psyche Matashitemo is written and illustrated by Tsubasa Fukuchi. It was serialized in Shogakukan's shōnen manga magazine Weekly Shōnen Sunday from July 9, 2014, to December 26, 2018. The series was collected into fifteen tankōbon volumes published by Shogakukan, from November 18, 2014, to February 18, 2019.

The manga was licensed in Indonesia by Elex Media Komputindo in 2016 as Saike's Repeated Days.

=== Volumes ===
No.	Japanese release date	Japanese ISBN
1	November 18, 2014	978-4-09-125523-5
2	February 15, 2015	978-4-09-125609-6
3	August 18, 2015	978-4-09-126218-9
4	January 18, 2016	978-4-09-126700-9
5	June 17, 2016	978-4-09-127169-3
6	September 16, 2016	978-4-09-127336-9
7	January 18, 2017	978-4-09-127487-8
8	March 17, 2017	978-4-09-127514-1
9	July 18, 2017	978-4-09-127673-5
10	November 17, 2017	978-4-09-127874-6
11	February 16, 2018	978-4-09-128086-2
12	June 18, 2018	978-4-09-128259-0
13	September 18, 2018	978-4-09-128398-6
14	December 18, 2018	978-4-09-128596-6
15	February 18, 2019	978-4-09-128788-5

== Reception ==
The series placed 7th on the 2nd Next Manga Awards by Da Vinci magazine and Niconico in 2016.
