= Cape Akarui =

Cape Akarui (68°29′S 41°23′E), also known as Cape Miho, is a rocky cape 11 miles (18 km) northeast of Cape Omega on the coast of Queen Maud Land. Mapped from surveys and air photos by the Japanese Antarctic Research Expedition, 1957–1962, and named Akarui-misaki ("bright cape").
