= Love Like Candy Floss =

2004 single by Sweets

Single by Sweets

from the album Sweets
- Released: February 11, 2004
- Genre: J-pop
- Label: Avex Trax
- Composer: Bounceback
- Lyricist: Romantic High
- Producer: Bounceback

Sweets singles chronology
"Love Raspberry Juice" (2003)	"Love Like Candy Floss" (2004)	"Grow Into Shinin' Stars / Never Ending Story / Shochū Omimai Mōshiagemasu" (2004)

"Love Like Candy Floss" (stylized as "Love like candy floss") is a song by Japanese girl group Sweets, released as their 3rd single on February 11, 2004.

== Background and release ==
"Love Like Candy Floss" is a mid-pop tune composed by Bounceback, with lyrics written by Romantic High. The single was released on February 11, 2004 under Avex Trax. The song was used as the theme song in the commercial for Circle K's bakery and as a theme song on the television show Shiodome Style. The song's theme was described as "falling in love with a friend."

== Music video ==
The music video was filmed in Nagano, making it the first of their videos to be filmed outside of a studio, and was described as "drama-like", featuring Haruna following an older man. The music video was featured on the television show Pop Jam for four weeks.

== Reception ==
"Love Like Candy Floss" reached #26 on the Oricon Weekly Singles Chart. CDJournal described the song as having a "fantastic and magical mood" that was "danceable", and that listeners can feel the "sparkle of adolescent girls through each and every emotion expressed in their voices."

== Track listing ==
Single
No.	Title	Lyrics	Music	Arrangement	Length
1.	"Love Like Candy Floss"	Romantic High	Bounceback	Bounceback
2.	"Love Like Candy Floss" (instrumental)		Bounceback	Bounceback

== Charts ==
Chart	Peak position
Oricon Weekly Singles Chart	26

== Tokyo Girls' Style version ==
"Love Like Candy Floss"

Single by Tokyo Girls' Style

from the album Kodō no Himitsu
- A-side: "Love Like Candy Floss"
- B-side: "Kitto Wasurenai... (Royal Mirrorball Mix)"
- Released: February 11, 2011
- Genre: J-pop; dance-pop
- Label: Avex Trax

Tokyo Girls' Style singles chronology
"Himawari to Hoshikuzu / Kitto, Wasurenai..." (2010)	"Love Like Candy Floss" (2011)	"Kodō no Himitsu / Sayonara, Arigatō" (2011)

=== Background and release ===
Tokyo Girls' Style, who had performed Sweets' songs at concerts before, released "Love Like Candy Floss" as their 5th single on February 11, 2011. The song was re-arranged by Hiroshi Matsui and categorized as dance-pop. It was used as a theme song for the television show Music Dragon Gate. The single was released in four different versions with different CD covers: a CD-only standard version, a standard version with an exclusive DVD, and two versions with limited edition DVDs.

=== Reception ===
"Love Like Candy Floss" peaked at #20 on the Oricon Weekly Singles Chart. CDJournal described the "sour-sweet melody" as "leaving behind a refreshing echo."

=== Track listing ===
Regular edition – physical edition
No.	Title	Lyrics	Music	Arrangement	Length
1.	"Love Like Candy Floss" (TGS ver.)	Romantic High	Bounceback	Hiroshi Matsui	4:25
2.	"Kitto Wasurenai... (きっと 忘れない、、、)" (Royal Mirrorball Mix)	Chihiro Kurosu	Hiroshi Matsui	Hiroshi Matsui	7:43
3.	"Love Like Candy Floss" (Royal Mirrorball Mix)	Romantic High	Bounceback	Hiroshi Matsui	6:21
4.	"Love Like Candy Floss" (Instrumental)	—	Bounceback	Hiroshi Matsui	4:27
5.	"Onnaji Kimochi (おんなじキモチ)" (Kids ver.)	Chihiro Kurosu	Miki Fujisue	Hiroshi Matsui	4:08
Total length:					27:40

Limited edition – physical edition
No.	Title	Lyrics	Music	Arrangement	Length
1.	"Love Like Candy Floss" (TGS ver.)	Romantic High	Bounceback	Hiroshi Matsui	4:11
2.	"Kitto Wasurenai... (きっと 忘れない、、、)" (Royal Mirrorball Mix)	Chihiro Kurosu	Hiroshi Matsui	Hiroshi Matsui	5:24
3.	"Love Like Candy Floss" (Instrumental)	—	Bounceback	Hiroshi Matsui	4:27
Total length:					18:29

Limited edition Type A – DVD
No.	Title	Length
1.	"Love Like Candy Floss" (First Demo Documentary + Live Shooting (初披露ドキュメント＋LIVE映像))

Limited edition Type B – DVD
No.	Title	Length
1.	"Odekake Movie (Daytime ver.) (お出かけムービー 〜日光編〜)"

Regular edition Type C – DVD
No.	Title	Lyrics	Music	Arrangement	Length
1.	"Love Like Candy Floss" (TGS ver.; Video Clip)	Romantic High	Bounceback	Hiroshi Matsui
2.	"Making Movie"

=== Charts ===
Chart	Peak position
Oricon Weekly Singles Chart	20
