= Anagle Mole =

Japanese manga series

- First volume cover

アナグルモール
- Genre: Action, comedy
- Manga
- Written by: Tsubasa Fukuchi
- Published by: Shogakukan
- Imprint: Shōnen Sunday Comics
- Magazine: Weekly Shōnen Sunday
- Original run: October 19, 2011 – January 8, 2014
- Volumes: 5
- icon

Anagle Mole (Japanese: アナグルモール, Hepburn: Anaguru Mōru) is a Japanese manga series written and illustrated by Tsubasa Fukuchi. It was serialized in Shogakukan's Weekly Shōnen Sunday from October 2011 to January 2014, with its chapters collected in five tankōbon volumes published by Shogakukan.

== Publication ==
Written and illustrated by Tsubasa Fukuchi, Anagle Mole started in Shogakukan's shōnen manga magazine Weekly Shōnen Sunday from October 19, 2011. The manga was put on hiatus in September 2012 and resumed in October 2013. The series finished on January 8, 2014. Shogakukan collected its chapters in five tankōbon volumes released from March 16, 2012, to February 18, 2014.

=== Volumes ===
No.	Japanese release date	Japanese ISBN
1	March 16, 2012	978-4-09-123569-5
2	June 18, 2012	978-4-09-123698-2
3	September 18, 2012	978-4-09-123809-2
4	December 18, 2013	978-4-09-124542-7
5	February 18, 2014	978-4-09-124571-7
