= Daruma Rock =

- Location within Antarctica

Highest point
- Coordinates: 68°32′S 41°11′E

Geography
- Location: Queen Maud Land, East Antarctica

Daruma Rock is a rock on the coast at the west side of Nishi-naga-iwa Glacier in Queen Maud Land. It was mapped from surveys and air photos by the Japanese Antarctic Research Expedition, 1957–62, and named "Daruma-iwa" (tumbler rock).
