= Sweets (group) =

Japanese girl group

- Origin: Japan
- Genres: J-pop
- Years active: 2003–2006
- Label: Avex Trax
- Past members: Aki; Aya; Haruna; Miori; Mai
- Website: www.avexnet.or.jp/sweets

Sweets (stylized as SweetS) was a Japanese girl group formed by Avex Trax in 2003. It consists of five members: Aki, Aya, Haruna, Miori, and Mai. The group debuted in 2003 with the song "Lolita Strawberry in Summer" and released the song "Love Like Candy Floss" in 2004. While active as a group, Sweets was also part of the supergroup Girl's Box along with other Avex artists. After three years of activity, Sweets disbanded in 2006.

== History ==
=== 2003: Debut ===
During the Avex Auditions 2002, five 12-year-old girls were selected out of fifteen finalists to create a new girl group, with the project planned by TV Tokyo's variety show Platinum Ticket. They first performed at A-nation '03 Avex Summer Festa on April 12, 2003. Later, on August 27, they released their first single, "Lolita Strawberry in Summer", as the fourth ending theme to Monkey Typhoon. The song was produced by Bounceback, who had previously written songs for BoA and Ayumi Hamasaki. On November 19, 2003, Sweets released their second single, "Love Raspberry Juice", which was featured as the theme song in the commercial for the game Tokyo Friend Park II: Friend Park e Asobi ni Ikō!! 100 girls appeared as extras in the music video. At the end of 2003, Sweets collaborated with Dream and Fruits Punch as the supergroup Girl's Box to release the single 1st X'mas.

=== 2004: "Love Like Candy Floss", Sweets ===
Sweets' third single, "Love Like Candy Floss", was released on February 11, 2004 as the theme song in the commercial for Circle K's bakery. The song's theme was described as "falling in love with a friend." The music video was filmed in Nagano, making it the first of their videos to be filmed outside of a studio, and was described as "drama-like", featuring Haruna following an older man. The music video was featured on the television show Pop Jam for four weeks. On March 3, 2004, Sweets released their first mini album, Sweets. On June 16, 2004, they released their fourth single, a triple A-side titled "Growin' into Shinin'" / "Never Ending Story" / "Shochū Omimai Mōshiagemasu." The song "Growin' into Shinin' Stars" was the official cheer song for the Yomiuri Giants beginning April 2004; "Never Ending Story" was the ending theme song to the variety show Doubutsu Kisou Tenkai from April to September 2004; and "Shochū Omimai Mōshiagemasu", a cover of the Candies song of the same name, was used as the theme song for a promotional campaign. On November 3, 2004, Sweets released the song "Sky" as the ending theme to Genseishin Justirisers. Later, Sweets participated in a second Christmas collaboration single with Dream and Aiko Kayō, which released on December 1, 2004.

=== 2005: Keep On Movin', first tour, Kashiwagi and Yoshimura's hiatus, and 5 Elements ===
On February 2, 2005, Sweets released the double A-side single "Countdown" / "Our Song (Wakare no Toki)", which was followed up with the release of their second mini album, Keep On Movin', on February 23, 2005. "Mienai Tsubasa" was released on June 1, 2005. The music video, as well as their behind-the-scenes DVD Wings of My Heart, were shot in Hawaii. Several members became ill during the shooting because of the rain.

On August 10, 2005, Sweets released their eighth single, "Earthship (Uchūsen Chikyūgō)", which was then followed up by their first concert tour named after the song, with three shows in Osaka, Nagoya, and Tokyo. Shortly after their tour, they performed at A-nation '05 and released their first photo book, Sweets #1. Afterwards, Aki and Aya went on hiatus from September 2005 to April 2006 to focus on their high school entrance exams. The remaining three members continued to promote without them and released "On the Way (Yakusoku no Basho e)" as their 9th single. On October 5, 2005, Sweets released their first studio album, 5 Elements. On November 16, 2005, Sweets collaborated with Dream, Nao Nagasawa, Nanase Hoshii, Aiko Kayō, Paradise Go! Go!, and Michi Saito for Girl's Box's third Christmas collaboration single.

=== 2006: Disbandment ===
Aki and Aya returned from hiatus, and Sweets released the single "Bitter Sweets" on March 23, 2006. During a promotional event at Tokyo Dome City Hall on March 26, 2006, all five members of Sweets announced that they were disbanding, citing interest in different career paths, as well as Aki and Aya retiring to focus on high school. Afterwards, on June 7, 2006, they released "Color of Tears" as their final single along with Hi Ma'am, their "graduation" photo book, and Precious Memories, their final behind-the-scenes DVD.

== Members ==
- Aki (Akiko Kashiwagi (柏木亜季子, Kashiwagi Akiko) - leader
- Aya (Ayaka Yoshimura (吉村綾花, Yoshimura Ayaka))
- Haruna (Haruna Takewa (竹輪春奈, Takewa Haruna))
- Miori (Miori Takimoto (瀧本美織, Takimoto Miori)
- Mai (Mai Iwasaki (岩崎舞, Iwasaki Mai))

== Discography ==
=== Studio albums ===
Title	Year	Details	Peak chart positions	Sales
Title	Year	Details	JPN	Sales
5 Elements	2005	Released: October 5, 2005; Label: Avex Trax; Format: CD; Track listing Disc 1: 1. "Moongrow"; 2. "Mienai Tsubasa" (ミエナイツバサ); 3. "Captain Smiley"; 4. "One"; 5. "I Am I"; 6. "After the Rain"; 7. "Wishing Upon the Shooting Star (Shishiza Ryūseigun)" (Wishing upon the shooting star ～獅子座流星群～); 8. "Rising Sun (Hikari)" (rising sun ～ヒカリ～); 9. "Earthship (Uchūsen Chikyūgō)" (Earthship ～宇宙船地球号～); 10. "Arigatō" (ありがとう); Disc 2: 1. "Lolita: Strawberry in Summer"; 2. "Love Raspberry Juice"; 3. "Love Like Candy Floss"; 4. "Grow into Shinin' Stars"; 5. "Sky"; 6. "Countdown"; 7. "Shochū Omimai Mōshiagemasu" (暑中お見舞い申し上げます); 8. "Sentimental Journey"; 9. "Our Song (Wakare no Toki)" (Our Song ～別れの詩～); 10. "Never Ending Story"	50	—

=== Extended plays ===
Title	Year	Details	Peak chart positions	Sales
Title	Year	Details	JPN	Sales
Sweets	2004	Released: March 3, 2004; Label: Avex Trax; Format: CD; Track listing: 1. "Tear "Lemon" Drop"; 2. "Love Like Candy Floss"; 3. "Lolita: Strawberry in Summer"; 4. "Lonesome Cherry"; 5. "Love Raspberry Juice"; 6. "Nijiro no Eien (虹色の永遠)"; 7. "Never Ending Story" (Album Mix); 8. "Love Raspberry Juice" (hi-q 146 Mix) (bonus track)	35	—
Keep On Movin'	2005	Released: February 23, 2005; Label: Avex Trax; Format: CD; Track listing: 1. "Countdown"; 2. "Resistance (Makenai Kimochi) (Resistance～マケナイキモチ～)"; 3. "Sky"; 4. "Snow Crystals"; 5. "Growin' into Shinin' Stars"; 6. "Into the Daylight (Hikari Sasu Hou e) (Into the daylight～ヒカリ射す方へ～)" 7. "Our Song (Wakare no Toki) (Our Song～別れの詩～)"; 8. "Mirai e (未来へ)"	56	—

=== Compilation albums ===
Title	Year	Details	Peak chart positions	Sales
Title	Year	Details	JPN	Sales
Delicious: Complete Best	2006	Released: August 2, 2006; Label: Avex Trax; Format: CD; Track listing: 1. "Lolita: Strawberry in Summer"; 2. "Love Raspberry Juice"; 3. "Love Like Candy Floss"; 4. "Grow into Shinin' Stars"; 5. "Never Ending Story" (Extended Mix); 6. "Shochū Omimai Mōshiagemasu" (暑中お見舞い申し上げます); 7. "Sky"; 8. "Our Song (Wakare no Toki)" (Our Song ～別れの詩～); 9. "Mienai Tsubasa" (ミエナイツバサ); 10. "Earthship (Uchūsen Chikyūgō)" (Earthship ～宇宙船地球号～); 11. "On the Way (Yakusoku no Basho e)" (On the way ～約束の場所へ～); 12. "Bitter Sweets"; 13. "Color of Tears"	234	—

=== Video albums ===
Title	Year	Details	Peak chart positions	Sales
Title	Year	Details	JPN	Sales
Sweets 1st Live Tour: Earthship (Uchūsen Chikyūgō)	2005	Released: December 7, 2005; Label: Avex Trax; Format: DVD; Track listing: 1. Opening; 2. "Countdown"; 3. "Mienai Tsubasa" (ミエナイツバサ); 4. "Sky"; 5. MC; 6. "Waiting for U"; 7. "Snow Crystals"; 8. "Nijiro no Eien" (虹色の永遠); 9. "One"; 10. "I Am I"; 11. "After the Rain"; 12. "Captain Smiley"; 13. "Wishing Upon the Shooting Star (Shishiza Ryūseigun)" (Wishing upon the shooting star ～獅子座流星群～); 14. "Shochū Omimai Mōshiagemasu" (暑中お見舞い申し上げます); 15. "Resistance (Makenai Kimochi)" (Resistance～マケナイキモチ～); 16. "Mirai e" (未来へ); 17. "Tear "Lemon" Drop"; 18. "Lolita Strawberry in Summer"; 19. "Love Raspberry Juice"; 20. "Lonesome Cherry"; 21. "Love Like Candy Floss"; 22. MC; 23. "Earthship (Uchūsen Chikyūgō)" (Earthship ～宇宙船地球号～); 24. "Grow into Shinin' Stars"; 25. "Our Song (Wakare no Toki)" (oursong ～別れの詩～); 26. MC; 27. "Never Ending Story"; 28. Endroll; 29. "On the Way (Yakusoku no Basho e)" (On the way ～約束の場所へ～) (music video); 30. "On the Way (Yakusoku no Basho e)" (making)	196	—

=== Singles ===
==== As lead artist ====
Title	Year	Peak chart positions	Sales	Album
Title	Year	JPN	Sales	Album
"Lolita Strawberry in Summer"	2003	23	—	Sweets
"Love Raspberry Juice"	2003	28	—	Sweets
"Love Like Candy Floss"	2004	26	—	Sweets
"Grow Into Shinin' Stars" / "Never Ending Story" / "Shochū Omimai Mōshiagemasu" (暑中お見舞い申し上げます)	2004	19	—	Keep On Movin'
"Sky"	2004	37	—	Keep On Movin'
"Countdown" / "Our Song (Wakare no Toki)" (oursong ～別れの詩～)	2005	48	—	5 Elements
"Mienai Tsubasa" (ミエナイツバサ)	2005	39	—	5 Elements
"Earthship (Uchūsen Chikyūgō)" (Earthship ～宇宙船地球号～)	2005	42	—	5 Elements
"On the Way (Yakusoku no Basho e)" (On the way ～約束の場所へ～)	2005	62	—	Delicious: Complete Best
"Bitter Sweets"	2006	44	—	Delicious: Complete Best
"Color of Tears"	2006	60	—	Delicious: Complete Best
"—" denotes releases that did not chart or were not released in that region.

==== As featured artist ====
Title	Year	Peak chart positions	Sales	Album
Title	Year	JPN	Sales	Album
"1st X'mas" (feat. Dream, Fruit Punch, and Sweets)	2003	—	—	Girl's Box: Best Hits Compilation Winter
"2nd X'mas" (feat. Dream, Sweets, and Aiko Kayō)	2004	—	—	Girl's Box: Best Hits Compilation Winter
"3rd X'mas" (feat. Dream, Nao Nagasawa, Sweets, Nanase Hoshii, Aiko Kayō, Paradise Go! Go!, and Michi Saito)	2005	62	—	Girl's Box: Best Hits Compilation Winter
"—" denotes releases that did not chart or were not released in that region.

==== Video singles ====
Title	Year	Details	Peak chart positions	Sales
Title	Year	Details	JPN	Sales
Lolita Strawberry in Summer	2003	Released: September 10, 2003; Label: Avex Trax; Format: DVD; Track listing: 1. "Lolita Strawberry in Summer"; 2. "Lolita Strawberry in Summer" (making flash)	—	—
"—" denotes releases that did not chart or were not released in that region.

=== DVDs ===
Title	Year	Details	Peak chart positions	Sales
Title	Year	Details	JPN	Sales
Wings of My Heart	2005	Released: July 20, 2005; Label: Avex Trax; Format: DVD; Track listing: 1. Prologue; 2. Episode 1: "I Want to See Reuben" (ルーベンに会いたい); 3. Episode 2: "Sweets 'n Blue"; 4. Episode 3: "Sunset / Sweets' Favorite Shops in Oahu (Part 1)" (SUNSET/SweetSのOahuで見つけたオキニなお店は(Part.1)); 5. Episode 4: "Meets Street Dancers / Sweets' Favorite Shops in Oahu (Part 2)" (MeetS street dancers★/SweetSのOahuで見つけたオキニなお店は(Part.2)); 6. Episode 5: "I Want to Jump into the Sky... / Sweets' Favorite Shops in Oahu (Part 3)" (空を飛びたい・・・/SweetSのOahuで見つけたオキニなお店は(Part.3)); 7. Episode 6: "Present" (プレゼント); 8. Episode 7: "Hawaii School for Girls"; 9. Episode 8: "Showtime / Epilogue / Sentimental Journey"	98	—
Precious Memories	2006	Released: June 7, 2006; Label: Avex Trax; Format: DVD	150	—
"—" denotes releases that did not chart or were not released in that region.

== Publications ==
=== Photo books ===
Year	Title	Publisher	ISBN
2005	Sweets #1	Kindaieigasha	ISBN 9784-764820449
2006	Hi Ma'am	Kindaieigasha	ISBN 978-4764820869
