= Kingyo Rock =

Kingyo Rock (68°37′S 41°0′E) is a large linear rock which lies at the south side of Omega Glacier where the glacier meets the sea, on the coast of Queen Maud Land, Antarctica. It was mapped from surveys and air photos by the Japanese Antarctic Research Expedition, 1957–62, and named Kingyo-iwa (goldfish rock).
