= Tsubasa Fukuchi =

Japanese manga artist

- Born: February 7, 1980 (age 46); Nikkō, Tochigi, Japan
- Occupation: Manga artist
- Known for: The Law of Ueki

Tsubasa Fukuchi (Japanese: 福地翼, Hepburn: Fukuchi Tsubasa; born February 7, 1980) is a Japanese manga artist best known as the creator of The Law of Ueki and its sequel, The Law of Ueki Plus.

The Law of Ueki was adapted into a 51–episode anime series. Manga artists Ato Sakurai (author of Artist Acro) and Ryō Azuchi (author of Softenni) previously worked as his assistants.

== Early life ==
Tsubasa Fukuchi was born in Tochigi Prefecture, north of Tokyo. He won his first prize in 1998, at Manga College contest with his work Kōderi at the age of 18. Fukuchi began his professional career in 2001 with The Law of Ueki.

== Works ==
- The Law of Ueki (うえきの法則, Ueki no Hōsoku) (2001–2005, serialized in Weekly Shōnen Sunday, Shogakukan)
- The Law of Ueki Plus (うえきの法則プラス, Ueki no Hōsoku Purasu) (2005–2007, serialized in Weekly Shōnen Sunday, Shogakukan)
- Takkoku!!! (タッコク!!!) (2009–2011, serialized in Shōnen Sunday Super, Shogakukan)
- Anagle Mole (2011–2014, serialized in Weekly Shōnen Sunday, Shogakukan)
- Psyche Matashitemo (サイケまたしても, Saike Mata Shitemo) (2014–2018, serialized in Weekly Shōnen Sunday, Shogakukan)
- Ponkotsu-chan Kenshōchū (ポンコツちゃん検証中) (2019–2021, serialized in Weekly Shōnen Sunday, Shogakukan)
- Golden Spiral (2022–2023, serialized in Weekly Shōnen Sunday, Shogakukan)
- Parashoppers (パラショッパーズ, Parashoppāzu) (2025–present, serialized in Weekly Shōnen Sunday, Shogakukan)
