= Nao Nagasawa =

Japanese actress (born 1984)

- Born: January 5, 1984 (age 42); Tokyo, Japan
- Occupations: Actress; model; singer
- Years active: 2002–present
- Spouse: Kōji Nakata (m. 2014)
- Children: 3
- Musical career
- Genres: J-pop
- Labels: King / Starchild 2003–2005 avex 2005–present
- Website: NAO.exe - Nao Nagasawa's blog

Nao Nagasawa (長澤 奈央, Nagasawa Nao; born January 5, 1984) is a Japanese actress, voice actress, former singer and model. She is known for her roles in various tokusatsu series, film, and drama, such as "Nanami Nono / Hurricane Blue" in the series Super Sentai Ninpu Sentai Hurricanger.

== Personal life ==
Nagasawa married to former professional footballer Kōji Nakata in 2014. The couple had three children.

== Filmography ==
- "Dozy" (こっくりさん, kokkurisan) (film)
- Ninpu Sentai Hurricanger (忍風戦隊ハリケンジャー, Ninpū Sentai Harikenjā) - Nanami Nono/Hurricane Blue (Super Sentai, 2002)
- Ninpu Sentai Hurricanger Shushuuto the Movie (忍風戦隊ハリケンジャー シュシュッと THE MOVIE, Ninpū Sentai Harikenjā Shushuuto za mūbī)- Nanami Nono/Hurricane Blue (Super Sentai, 2002)
- Ninpu Sentai Hurricanger vs. Gaoranger (忍風戦隊ハリケンジャーVSガオレンジャー, Ninpū Sentai Harikenjā Tai Gaorenjā) - Nanami Nono/Hurricane Blue (Super Sentai, 2003)
- Bakuryū Sentai Abaranger vs. Hurricaneger (爆竜戦隊アバレンジャーVSハリケンジャー, Bakuryū Sentai Abarenjā Tai Harikenjā) - Nanami Nono/Hurricane Blue (Super Sentai, 2004)
- Ultraman Max (ウルトラマンマックス, Urutoraman Makkusu) - Natsumi (Ep.13-14) (Ultra Series, 2005–2006)
- GoGo Sentai Boukenger vs. Super Sentai (轟轟戦隊ボウケンジャー VS スーパー戦隊, GōGō Sentai Bōkenjā Basu Sūpā Sentai) - Nanami Nono/Hurricane Blue (Super Sentai, 2007)
- Nao Nagasawa's Try! Try! Try! (長澤奈央のｔｒｙ！ｔｒｙ！ｔｒｙ！) - Nikkei characters (fumetti)
- "It's Darkest Before Dawn" (いちばん暗いのは夜明け前, ichiban kurai no wa yoake mae) - Taeko in (TV drama)
- Girl's BOX the movie
- K-tai Investigator 7 (ケータイ捜査官７（セブン）, Kētai Sōsakan Sebun) - Mayuko Hasekura (TV drama, 2008)
- Superior Ultraman 8 Brothers (大決戦！超ウルトラ８兄弟, Daikessen! Chō Urutora Hachi Kyōdai) - Daigo's mother (cameo) (Ultra Series, 2008)
- Tomica Hero: Rescue Force (トミカヒーロー レスキューフォース, Tomika Hīrō Resukyū Fōsu) - Kirara Mamiya, 2009
- Hotel Chelsea - Emi Tanaka, 2009
- Daimajin Kanon - Ikechiyo, 2010
- Kamen Rider W (仮面ライダーＷ（ダブル）, Kamen Raidā Daburu) - Lily Shirogane (Ep.27-28) (Kamen Rider Series, 2010)
- Kamen Rider W Forever: A to Z/The Gaia Memories of Fate (仮面ライダーＷ（ダブル） FOREVER AtoZ／運命のガイアメモリ, Kamen Raidā Daburu Fōebā: Ē tu Zetto/Unmei no Gaia Memori) - Lily Shirogane (Cameo) (Kamen Rider Series, 2010)
- Kamen Rider W Returns (仮面ライダーＷ（ダブル） RETURNS, Kamen Raidā Daburu Ritānzu) - Lily Shirogane (Kamen Rider Accel) (Kamen Rider Series, 2011)
- Kaizoku Sentai Gokaiger (海賊戦隊ゴーカイジャー, Kaizoku Sentai Gōkaijā) - Nanami Nono/Hurricane Blue (Ep. 25-26) (Super Sentai, 2011)
- A Day of One Hero - Herself (Direct-to-video special, 2011)
- Stand Up! Vanguard (STAND UP!! ヴァンガード) - Kumiko Miura (Hiroki's deceased mother), 2012
- Kamen Rider Fourze (仮面ライダーフォーゼ, Kamen Raidā Fōze) - Utsugi Haruka (Ep.21-22, 48) (Kamen Rider Series, 2012)
- Kamen Rider Fourze the Movie: Space, Here We Come! (仮面ライダーフォーゼ ＴＨＥ ＭＯＶＩＥ みんなで宇宙キターッ！, Kamen Raidā Fōze Za Mūbī Minna de Uchū kitā) - Utsugi Haruka (Cameo) (Kamen Rider Series, 2012)
- Kamen Rider × Kamen Rider Wizard & Fourze: Movie War Ultimatum (仮面ライダー×仮面ライダー ウィザード&フォーゼ MOVIE大戦アルティメイタム, Kamen Raidā × Kamen Raidā Wizādo Ando Fōze Mūbī Taisen Arutimeitamu) - Utsugi Haruka (Kamen Rider Series, 2012)
- Great Teacher Onizuka - Katayama Saki (Great Teacher Onizuka, 2012)
- Unofficial Sentai Akibaranger: Season Tsuu (非公認戦隊アキバレンジャー シーズン痛（ツー）, Hikōnin Sentai Akibaranger: Shīzun Tsū) - Hadezukin (Voice, Ep.20) (Super Sentai Series, 2013)
- Ninpu Sentai Hurricanger: 10 Years After (忍風戦隊ハリケンジャー 10 YEARS AFTER, Ninpū Sentai Harikenjā Ten Iyāzu Afutā) - Nanami Nono/Hurricane Blue (Super Sentai, 2013)
- Travelers: Jigen Keisatsu - Ai, 2013
- 009-1: The End of the Beginning - Miriam (2013)
- Kamen Rider 1 (film) (仮面ライダー1号, Kamen Raidā Ichigō) - Eagla (イーグラ Īgura) (Kamen Rider Series, 2016)
- Secret × Warrior Phantomirage! (ひみつ×戦士ファントミラージュ!, Himitsu x Senshi Fantomirāju!) - Maiko Asumi (Girls × Heroine Series, 2019)
- Utsusemi no Mori (2021)

== Discography ==
=== Albums ===
- 2003 August 6: Trip Lip
- 2006 March 29: BODIES
- 2007 March 21: LOVE BODY -SEASON 1-
- 2008 March 5: NAO BEST

=== Singles ===
Release Date	Title	Chart History		Album	Record Label	
Release Date	Title	Peak	Weeks	Album	Imprint	Distribution
2003 June 25	"Pump up"	#33	5	Trip Lip	Starchild	King
2004 January 21	"×○×○×○"	#27	4		Starchild	King
2005 March 24	"Mama Said"	#60	2	BODIES	avex trax	avex
2005 July 27	"Love Body"	#54	3	BODIES	avex trax	avex
2005 November 30	"Fun Time"	#63	1	BODIES	avex trax	avex
2006 September 13	"Love Body III"	-	-		avex trax	avex
2006 December 6	"GAME/Love Body for..."	-	-		avex trax	avex
2007 September 19	"To You"	-	-		avex trax	avex
