= List of Major volumes =

The cover of Major volume 1 as released by Shogakukan on January 13, 1995 in Japan.

This is a list of chapters for the manga series Major written and illustrated by Takuya Mitsuda. The manga started in the 1994 issue #33 of Weekly Shōnen Sunday on August 3, 1994. The series finished with its 747th chapter in the 2010 issue #32 of Weekly Shōnen Sunday published on July 7, 2010. Seventy-eight tankōbon volumes were published by Shogakukan. An anime adaptation based on the manga was produced by Studio Hibari and aired on NHK.

A sequel, titled Major 2nd, began in Weekly Shōnen Sunday on March 11, 2015.

== Volume list ==
=== Volumes 1–20 ===
No.	Release date	ISBN
1	January 13, 1995	4-09-123491-7
2	April 18, 1995	4-09-123492-5
3	June 17, 1995	4-09-123493-3
4	July 18, 1995	4-09-123494-1
5	October 18, 1995	4-09-123495-X
6	December 9, 1995	4-09-123496-8
7	February 17, 1996	4-09-123497-6
8	May 18, 1996	4-09-123498-4
9	July 18, 1996	4-09-123499-2
10	October 18, 1996	4-09-123500-X
11	January 18, 1997	4-09-125151-X
12	March 18, 1997	4-09-125152-8
13	May 17, 1997	4-09-125153-6
14	July 18, 1997	4-09-125154-4
15	September 18, 1997	4-09-125155-2
16	November 18, 1997	4-09-125156-0
17	February 18, 1998	4-09-125157-9
18	April 18, 1998	4-09-125158-7
19	June 18, 1998	4-09-125159-5
20	August 8, 1998	4-09-125160-9

=== Volumes 21–40 ===
No.	Release date	ISBN
21	October 17, 1998	4-09-125501-9
22	December 10, 1998	4-09-125502-7
23	March 18, 1999	4-09-125503-5
24	May 18, 1999	4-09-125504-3
25	July 17, 1999	4-09-125505-1
26	October 18, 1999	4-09-125506-X
27	January 18, 2000	4-09-125507-8
28	March 18, 2000	4-09-125508-6
29	May 18, 2000	4-09-125509-4
30	July 18, 2000	4-09-125510-8
31	September 18, 2000	4-09-126081-0
32	November 18, 2000	4-09-126082-9
33	January 18, 2001	4-09-126083-7
34	March 17, 2001	4-09-126084-5
35	May 18, 2001	4-09-126085-3
36	August 9, 2001	4-09-126086-1
37	November 18, 2001	4-09-126087-X
38	January 18, 2002	4-09-126088-8
39	April 18, 2002	4-09-126089-6
40	May 18, 2002	4-09-126090-X

=== Volumes 41–60 ===
No.	Release date	ISBN
41	August 18, 2002	4-09-126541-3
42	November 18, 2002	4-09-126542-1
43	January 18, 2003	4-09-126543-X
44	April 18, 2003	4-09-126544-8
45	June 18, 2003	4-09-126545-6
46	September 18, 2003	4-09-126546-4
47	November 18, 2003	4-09-126547-2
48	February 18, 2004	4-09-126548-0
49	May 18, 2004	4-09-126549-9
50	September 17, 2004	4-09-126550-2
51	November 1, 2004	4-09-127231-2
52	January 14, 2005	4-09-127232-0
53	May 18, 2005	4-09-127233-9
54	June 16, 2005	4-09-127234-7
55	August 8, 2005	4-09-127235-5
56	November 18, 2005	4-09-127236-3
57	January 14, 2006	4-09-120027-3
58	April 18, 2006	4-09-120327-2
59	June 16, 2006	4-09-120416-3
60	September 15, 2006	4-09-120579-8

=== Volumes 61–78 ===
No.	Release date	ISBN
61	December 16, 2006	4-09-120695-6
62	February 16, 2007	978-4-09-121006-7
63	May 18, 2007	978-4-09-121059-3
64	August 10, 2007	978-4-09-121166-8
65	December 15, 2007	978-4-09-121248-1
66	February 18, 2008	978-4-09-121288-7
67	May 16, 2008	978-4-09-121396-9
68	August 11, 2008	978-4-09-121460-7
69	November 18, 2008	978-4-09-121514-7
70	December 11, 2008	978-4-09-121536-9
71	February 18, 2009	978-4-09-121596-3
72	June 18, 2009	978-4-09-122014-1
73	September 17, 2009	978-4-09-121729-5
74	December 18, 2009	978-4-09-122025-7
75	March 18, 2010	978-4-09-122184-1
76	May 18, 2010	978-4-09-122289-3
718. ? (待ってよおとさん); 719. ? (運命の最終戦); 720. ? (バッテリー対決); 721. ? (見せたかった勇姿); 722. ? (パーフェクト); 723. ? (ウイニングショット); 724. ? (読み合い); 725. ? (それぞれの役割); 726. ? (プレッシャーの効果); 727. ? (プライドの重さ)
77	September 17, 2010	978-4-09-122520-7
78	December 17, 2010	978-4-09-122680-8
