= List of Major volumes (61–78) =

This is a list of chapters for the manga series Major written and illustrated by Takuya Mitsuda. The manga started in the 1994 issue #33 of Weekly Shōnen Sunday on August 3, 1994. The series finished in the 2010 issue #32 of Weekly Shōnen Sunday published on July 7, 2010. Seventy-eight tankōbon volumes were published by Shogakukan. An anime adaptation based on the manga was produced by Studio Hibari and aired on NHK.

== Volume list ==
No.	Release date	ISBN
61	December 16, 2006	4-09-120695-6
568. ? (終盤の攻防, "Shūban no Kōbō"); 569. ? (気持ちのエンジン, "Kimochi no Enjin"); 570. ? (息子として, "Musuko Toshite"); 571. ? (贖罪のために, "Shokuzai no Tame ni"); 572. ? (胸に空いた穴, "Mune ni Ai Ta Ana"); 573. ? (理想のゴール, "Risō no Gōru"); 574. ? (それぞれの覚悟, "Sorezore no Kakugo"); 575. ? (引退試合（ラストゲーム）, "Intai Shiai (Rasuto Gēmu)"); 576. ? (なすべきこと, "Nasu beki koto"); 577. ? (アメリカの誇り（プライド）, "Amerika no Hokori (Puraido)")
62	February 16, 2007	978-4-09-121006-7
578. ? (13年越しの対決, "13 Nen Goshi no Taiketsu"); 579. ? (ギブソン倒れる, "Gibuson Taoreru"); 580. ? (もういいんだよ, "Mō Īn Da Yo"); 581. ? (それぞれの朝, "Sorezore no Asa"); 582. ? (戦友たち, "Senyū Tachi"); 583. ? (眉村の原点, "Mayu Mura no Genten"); 584. ? (先制のチャンス, "Sensei no Chansu"); 585. ? (眉村の異変, "Mayu Mura no Ihen"); 586. ? (海堂の限界, "Kaidō no Genkai"); 587. ? (誇りを胸に, "Hokori o Mune ni")
63	May 18, 2007	978-4-09-121059-3
588. ? (ワンサイドゲーム, "Wansaidogēmu"); 589. ? (柱の不在, "Bashira no Fuzai"); 590. ? (無言の檄, "Mugon no Geki"); 591. ? (球場にある夢, "Kyūjō ni Aru Yume"); 592. ? (ご苦労さん, "Gokurōsan"); 593. ? (嫌な流れ, "Iya Na Nagare"); 594. ? (不安的中!?, "Fuan Tekichū!?"); 595. ? (1点差の攻防, "1 Ten Sa no Kōbō"); 596. ? (来たぞ, "Kitazo"); 597. ? (バーンズVS.吾郎, "Bānzu VS. Gorō")
64	August 10, 2007	978-4-09-121166-8
598. ? (それぞれの進化, "Sorezore no Shinka"); 599. ? (屈辱をバネに, "Kutsujoku o Bane ni"); 600. ? (すり抜けた勝機, "Surinuke ta Shōki"); 601. ? (決着!?, "Ketchaku!?"); 602. ? (打球の行方, "Dakyū no Yukue"); 603. ? (あの日からずっと, "Ano Hi Kara Zutto"); 604. ? (汚名返上, "Omei Henjō"); 605. ? (最善の努力, "Saizen no Doryoku"); 606. ? (自分自身のため, "Jibun Jishin no Tame"); 607. ? (悔いなき決着, "Kui Naki Ketchaku")
65	December 15, 2007	978-4-09-121248-1
608. ? (勝ち越しのチャンス, "Kachikoshi no Chansu"); 609. ? (ギリギリの攻防, "Girigiri no Kōbō"); 610. ? (勝たせてやってくれ, "Kata Se Te Yatte Kure"); 611. ? (最後の試合で, "Saigo no Shiai de"); 612. ? (終わっちゃいねえ, "Owaccha i Nē"); 613. ? (父の背中, "Chichi no Senaka"); 614. ? (死闘の果て, "Shitō no Hate"); 615. ? (残酷な結末, "Zankoku na Ketsumatsu"); 616. ? (父と子と, "Chichi Tokoto"); 617. ? (笑顔のお別れ, "Egao no O Wakare")
66	February 18, 2008	978-4-09-121288-7
618. ? (温度差, "Ondo Sa"); 619. ? (試運転, "Shiunten"); 620. ? (キーンの分析, "Kīn no Bunseki"); 621. ? (開幕を前に, "Kaimaku o Mae ni"); 622. ? (初陣, "Uijin"); 623. ? (鮮烈デビュー, "Senretsu Debyū"); 624. ? (異変, "Ihen"); 625. ? (壊れた歯車, "Koware ta Haguruma"); 626. "Unexpected Decision" (まさかの決断, "Masakano Ketsudan"); 627. ? (周囲の不安, "Shūi no Fuan")
67	May 16, 2008	978-4-09-121396-9
628. ? (取りこし苦労？, "Tori Koshi Kurō?"); 629. ? (逃げ場なきピンチ, "Nigeba Naki Pinchi"); 630. ? (キーンの荒療治, "Kīn no Araryōji"); 631. ? (イップスの泥沼, "Ippusu no Doronuma"); 632. ? (悪化, "Akka"); 633. ? (悩めるサウスポー, "Nayame ru Sausupō"); 634. ? (治療, "Chiryō"); 635. ? (紛れもない現実, "Magire mo Nai Genjitsu"); 636. ? (オリバーの思惑, "Oribā no Omowaku"); 637. ? (治療の成果, "Chiryō no Seika")
68	August 11, 2008	978-4-09-121460-7
638. ? (昇格のノルマ, "Shōkaku no Noruma"); 639. ? (バロメーター, "Baromētā"); 640. ? (消えた威圧感, "Kieta Iatsu Kan"); 641. ? (再昇格, "Sai Shōkaku"); 642. ? (プロの資質, "Puro no Shishitsu"); 643. ? (悩めるルーキー達, "Nayame ru Rūkī Tachi"); 644. ? (復調の兆し…？, "Fukuchō no Kizashi...?"); 645. ? (新しいスタイル, "Atarashī Sutairu"); 646. ? (電撃復帰, "Dengeki Fukki"); 647. ? (復帰の理由, "Fukki no Riyū")
69	November 18, 2008	978-4-09-121514-7
648. ? (復帰戦, "Fukki Sen"); 649. ? (衰え, "Otoroe"); 650. ? (引導, "Indō"); 651. ? (衰えと決断, "Otoroe to Ketsudan"); 652. ? (わけわかんねえ, "Wake Wakannē"); 653. ? (明かされた過去, "Akasa Re Ta Kako"); 654. ? (大きな志, "Ōkina Kokorozashi"); 655. ? (きざし, "Kizashi"); 656. ? (トンネルの出口, "Tonneru no Deguchi"); 657. ? (本当のスタート, "Hontō no Sutāto")
70	December 11, 2008	978-4-09-121536-9
658. ? (それぞれの夏, "Sorezore no Natsu"); 659. ? (最高の幸せ, "Saikō no Shiawase"); 660. ? (いっしょに, "Issho ni"); 661. ? (火種, "Hidane"); 662. ? (ジャーニーマン, "Jā Nīman"); 663. ? (暗黙のルール, "Anmoku no Rūru"); 664. ? (亀裂, "Kiretsu"); 665. ? (負の連鎖, "Make no Rensa"); 666. ? (エースの檄, "Ēsu no Geki"); 667. ? (マードックの過去, "Mādokku no Kako")
71	February 18, 2009	978-4-09-121596-3
668. ? (エースの責任, "Ēsu no Sekinin"); 669. ? (伝染する闘志, "Densen Suru Tōshi"); 670. ? (ラストチャンス, "Rasuto Chansu"); 671. ? (忘れていた悦び, "Wasure Teita Yorokobi"); 672. ? (ワールドシリーズへの道, "Wārudo Shirīzu he no Michi"); 673. ? (初の親子対決, "Hatsu no Oyako Taiketsu"); 674. ? (天王山, "Tennōzan"); 675. ? (思わぬ敵, "Omowa nu Teki"); 676. ? (戻らないリズム, "Modora nai Rizumu"); 677. ? (９回のマウンド, "9 Kai no Maundo")
72	June 18, 2009	978-4-09-122014-1
678. ? (異変の正体, "Ihen no Shōtai"); 679. ? (緊急措置, "Kinkyū Sochi"); 680. ? (血行障害, "Kekkō Shōgai"); 681. ? (退路なき戦い, "Tairo Naki Tatakai"); 682. ? (そこにある夢, "Soko ni Aru Yume"); 683. ? (決戦の刻, "Kessen no Koku"); 684. ? (動き出す試合, "Ugokidasu Shiai"); 685. ? (ワンサイドゲーム, "Wan Saido Gēmu"); 686. ? (諦めるな, "Akirameru na"); 687. ? (逆襲, "Gyakushū")
73	September 17, 2009	978-4-09-121729-5
688. ? (追撃, "Tsuigeki"); 689. ? (どうした茂野!？, "Dōshita Shigeno!?"); 690. ? (乱調の理由, "Ranchō no Riyū"); 691. ? (自己満足, "Jiko Manzoku"); 692. ? (最後のチャンス, "Saigo no Chansu"); 693. ? (つないでくれ, "Tsunai de Kure"); 694. ? (勝利の女神, "Shōri no Megami"); 695. ? (勝負の行方, "Shōbu no Yukue"); 696. ? (駆り立てる物, "Karitateru Mono"); 697. ? (発症, "Hasshō")
74	December 18, 2009	978-4-09-122025-7
698. ? (死闘の果てに, "Shitō no Hate ni"); 699. ? (ポストシーズン, "Posuto Shīzun"); 700. ? (球団の思惑, "Kyūdan no Omowaku"); 701. ? (Jr.の秘策, "Jr. no Hisaku"); 702. ? (止まらない快投, "Tomaranai Kaitō"); 703. ? (栄冠への執念, "Eikan e no Shūnen"); 704. ? (代わるな, "Kawarana"); 705. ? (気持ちの差, "Kimochi no Sa"); 706. ? (激闘の果てに, "Gekitō no Hate ni"); 707. ? (帰国許可, "Kikoku Kyoka")
75	March 18, 2010	978-4-09-122184-1
708. ? (帰国); 709. ? (監視の目); 710. ? (それぞれの明日); 711. ? (プロポーズ); 712. ? (巡ってきたチャンス); 713. ? (もう1人のサムライ); 714. ? (寿也の選択); 715. ? (反撃の口火); 716. ? (最高だよ); 717. ? (8年越しのリベンジ)
76	May 18, 2010	978-4-09-122289-3
718. ? (待ってよおとさん); 719. ? (運命の最終戦); 720. ? (バッテリー対決); 721. ? (見せたかった勇姿); 722. ? (パーフェクト); 723. ? (ウイニングショット); 724. ? (読み合い); 725. ? (それぞれの役割); 726. ? (プレッシャーの効果); 727. ? (プライドの重さ)
77	September 17, 2010	978-4-09-122520-7
728. ? (監督と4番); 729. ? (クローザーふたり); 730. ? (VS. キーン); 731. ? (最終回突入!!); 732. ? (勝つために); 733. ? (熱投は続く); 734. ? (あんがとな); 735. ? (約束の相手); 736. ? (ホーネッツで...!!); 737. ? (１枚のチケット)
78	December 17, 2010	978-4-09-122680-8
738. "Mommy's Face" (母さんの顔); 739. "Moment to the Dream" (夢の瞬間へ); 740. "As father, as son" (子として、父として); 741. "Junior!" (Jr!); 742. "Last Selection" (最後の球種); 743. "Daddy!" (おとさん！); 744. "Daddy's Secret" (おとさんのひみつ); 745. "Showing you Something" (みせたいもの); 746. "Showdown with Daddy" (おとさんの勝負); 747. "Goro's Dream, Everyone's Dream" (吾郎の夢、みんなの夢)
