= List of Major volumes (41–60) =

This is a list of chapters for the manga series Major written and illustrated by Takuya Mitsuda. The manga started in the 1994 issue #33 of Weekly Shōnen Sunday on August 3, 1994. The series finished in the 2010 issue #32 of Weekly Shōnen Sunday published on July 7, 2010. Seventy-eight tankōbon volumes were published by Shogakukan. An anime adaptation based on the manga was produced by Studio Hibari and aired on NHK.

== Volume list ==
No.	Release date	ISBN
41	August 18, 2002	4-09-126541-3
368. "Runner-up" (韋駄天野郎, "Idaten Yarō"); 369. "The Real Left Arm" (本物の左腕, "Honmono no Sawan"); 370. "A Subtle Change" (微妙なズレ, "Bimyō na Zure"); 371. "Aim for the Winning Shot" (キメ球 狙い, "Kime Dama Nerai"); 372. "Come on!!"; 373. "Is There Nothing Else We Can Do...?" (なす術はもう...!?, "Nasu Sube Ha Mō...!?"); 374. "One More Ball" (あと1球, "Ato 1 Kyū"); 375. "Fight Back" (開き直って, "Hirakinaotte"); 376. "Last Spurt" (ラスト・スパート, "Rasuto. Supāto"); 377. "Tag Up!!" (タッチアップ!!, "Tacchi Appu!!")
42	November 18, 2002	4-09-126542-1
378. "Declaration of Victory" (勝利宣言, "Shōri Sengen"); 379. "Lucky Day" (ラッキー・デイ, "Rakkī.Dei"); 380. "Fired Up" (気合い十分, "Kiai Jū Fun"); 381. "The Morning of the Decisive Battle" (決戦の朝, "Kessen no Asa"); 382. "A Truly Ardent Summer" (一番熱い夏, "Ichiban Atsui Natsu"); 383. "A Sudden Chance" (いきなりのチャンス, "Ikinari no Chansu"); 384. "Absolute Confidence" (絶対的な自信, "Zettai Teki na Jishin"); 385. "Kaido's Pace" (海堂ペース, "Kaidō Pēsu"); 386. "A Painful Beginning" (苦しい立ち上がり, "Kurushī Tachiagari"); 387. "Maximum Alert" (最高警戒レベル, "Saikō Keikai Reberu")
43	January 18, 2003	4-09-126543-X
388. "A Suspicious Cloud Approaches" (怪しい雲行き, "Ayashī Kumoyuki"); 389. "A Fruitless Starting Strategy" (ダメ元作戦, "Dame Moto Sakusen"); 390. "Shimizu's Objective" (清水の狙い, "Shimizu no Nerai"); 391. "Bounce Ball" (バウンド投球, "Baundo Tōkyū"); 392. "An Absurd Strategy" (無茶な作戦, "Mucha na Sakusen"); 393. "A Fearless Smile" (不敵な笑み, "Futeki na Emi"); 394. "Target" (狙い打ち, "Neraiuchi"); 395. "Faulty Ball" (ぬける球, "Nukeru Tama"); 396. "Never Give Up!!"; 397. "Downpour" (どしゃ降りの雨, "Doshaburi no Ame")
44	April 18, 2003	4-09-126544-8
398. "Catch Hold of The Flow!" (流れをつかめ!!, "Nagare o Tsukame!!"); 399. "One More Chance!?" (好機（チャンス）到来!?, "Kōki (Chansu) Tōrai!?"); 400. "Good Luck!?" (好運!?, "Kōun!?"); 401. "A Sudden Upset!?" (突然の乱調!?, "Totsuzen no Ranchō!?"); 402. "Goro's Intentions" (吾郎の試み, "Gorō no Kokoromi"); 403. "Our Team" (俺達の聖秀（チーム）, "Ore Tachi no Hijiri Shigeru (Chīmu)"); 404. "Direct Confrontation" (真っ向勝負, "Makkō Shōbu"); 405. "How Many Pitches Has It Been!?" (何球目だ!?, "Nan Kyū Me Da!?"); 406. "Saved" (助かった, "Tasukatta"); 407. "Bad Flow" (悪い流れ, "Warui Nagare")
45	June 18, 2003	4-09-126545-6
408. "My Pitches" (俺の直球（ボール）, "Ore no Chokkyū (Bōru)"); 409. "Battle Instincts" (闘争本能, "Tōsō Honnō"); 410. "Remaining Strength" (余力, "Yoryoku"); 411. "I Don't Want to Believe" (信じたくない, "Shinji Taku Nai"); 412. "I'm Not Gonna Lose" (負けやしねぇ。, "Make Yashi Nē."); 413. "In This Inning" (この回だ, "Kono Kai Da"); 414. "Don't Panic" (うろたえるな, "Urotaeru Na"); 415. "So This Is Mayumura" (これが眉村か, "Kore ga Mayu Mura ka"); 416. "Battle of Titans" (王者の葛藤, "Ōja no Kattō"); 417. "Rebellion" (造反, "Zōhan")
46	September 18, 2003	4-09-126546-4
418. "Let's Finish This!" (決めてこい！, "Kime Te Koi!"); 419. "Please, Dad" (お願いおとさん, "Onegai Oto San"); 420. "The End of Their Machinations" (策謀の果て, "Sakubō no Hate"); 421. "An Enormous Mountain" (どでかい山, "Do Dekai Yama"); 422. "See It Through" (見届けるよ, "Mitodokeru Yo"); 423. "The Ace Covered in Wounds" (傷だらけのエース, "Kizu Darake no Ēsu"); 424. "All or Nothing" (乾坤一擲（けんこんいってき）, "Kenkonitteki (Kenkonitteki)"); 425. "Decisive Battle After The Rain" (雨上がりの決戦, "Ameagari no Kessen"); 426. "The Deadly Battle's End" (死闘の結末, "Shitō no Ketsumatsu"); 427. "Come Back!!" (戻ってきなよ!!, "Modotte Ki Na Yo!!")
47	November 18, 2003	4-09-126547-2
428. "Summer Festival" (夏祭り, "Natsu Matsuri"); 429. "Baton Touch" (バトンタッチ, "Batontacchi"); 430. "Japanese Baseball Boy" (日本の野球少年, "Nippon no Yakyū Shōnen"); 431. "Major Temptation" (メジャーへのいざない, "Mejā He no Izanai"); 432. "Family" (家族, "Kazoku"); 433. "The Highest Stage" (最高の舞台, "Saikō no Butai"); 434. "New Journey" (新たな旅立ち, "Arata na Tabidachi"); 435. "America" (アメリカ, "Amerika"); 436. "Challenger" (挑戦者たち, "Chōsen Sha Tachi"); 437. "Tryout" (トライアウト, "Torai Auto")
48	February 18, 2004	4-09-126548-0
438. "It Must Be a Knothole" (ふし穴じゃなけりゃ, "Fushi Ana Ja Nakerya"); 439. "Bolton" (ボルトン, "Boruton"); 440. "The Results of The Tryout..." (トライアウトの結果は..., "Torai Auto no Kekka Ha..."); 441. "Color Doesn't Matter" (黒だの黄色だの, "Kuro Dano Kīro Dano"); 442. "Humiliating Handicap" (屈辱的なハンデ, "Kutsujoku Teki na Hande"); 443. "Road to Major"; 444. "Dream" (夢, "Yume"); 445. "Just Try Your Best" (魂ぶつけるだけ, "Damashī Butsukeru Dake"); 446. "We Can Do It!" (やってやる！, "Yatte Yaru!"); 447. "First Guest to Arrive" (先客だ, "Senkyaku Da")
49	May 18, 2004	4-09-126549-9
448. "Salmons' Ace" (サーモンズのエース, "Sāmonzu no Ēsu"); 449. "This Is The Majors" (これが世界（メジャー）。, "Kore Ga Sekai (Mejā)."); 450. "Spoiled Brat!" (甘いんだよ！, "Amain Da Yo!"); 451. "A Guide On The Path to The Majors" (世界への道しるべ, "Sekai he no Michishirube"); 452. "Triple a Cougars" (3Aクーガーズ, "3 A Kūgāzu"); 453. "Pinch-hitter, Gibson" (代打､ギブソン。, "Daida, Gibuson."); 454. "Idiot Father" (バカ親父, "Baka Oyaji"); 455. "Past Mistakes" (過去の過ち, "Kako no Ayamachi"); 456. "Discharge" (解雇（リリース）, "Kaiko (Rirīsu)"); 457. "From a New World" (新天地にて。, "Shintenchi Nite.")
50	September 17, 2004	4-09-126550-2
458. "Alice Jinnai" (陣内アルス, "Jinnai Arusu"); 459. ? (度胸満点！, "Dokyō Manten!"); 460. ? (骨のあるチーム, "Kotsu no Aru Chīmu"); 461. ? (シーズン開幕, "Shīzun Kaimaku"); 462. ? (危機感！, "Kiki Kan!"); 463. ? (喝, "Katsu"); 464. ? (個人の温度差, "Kojin no Ondo Sa"); 465. ? (1人1人が本気で, "1 Nin 1 Nin ga Honki de"); 466. ? (ゴールデンルーキー, "Gōruden Rūkī"); 467. ? (ピッチャー至上主義？, "Picchā Shijō Shugi?")
51	November 1, 2004	4-09-127231-2
468. ? (キーンの実力。, "Kīn no Jitsuryoku."); 469. ? (吾郎の目指すべき道, "Gorō no Mokushi Su Beki Michi"); 470. ? (サンダースの引き際, "Sandāsu no Hikigiwa"); 471. ? (ヒーロー, "Hīrō"); 472. ? (わだかまり, "Wadakamari"); 473. ? (プレーオフ初戦, "Purēofu Shosen"); 474. ? (ケジメ, "Kejime"); 475. ? (進化（エヴォリューション）, "Shinka (Evuoryūshon)"); 476. ? (手応え, "Tegotae"); 477. ? (決戦前夜, "Kessen Zenya")
52	January 14, 2005	4-09-127232-0
478. ? (波瀾の幕開け, "Haran no Makuake"); 479. ? (緊急登板, "Kinkyū Tōban"); 480. ? (組み立て, "Kumitate"); 481. ? (負けゲーム, "Make Gēmu"); 482. ? (バッツの意地, "Battsu no Iji"); 483. ? (アクシデント, "Akushidento"); 484. ? (リミッター, "Rimittā"); 485. ? (運命の1球, "Unmei no 1 Kyū"); 486. ? (勝負の代償, "Shōbu no Daishō"); 487. ? (Jr.の昇格, "Jr. no Shōkaku")
53	May 18, 2005	4-09-127233-9
488. ? (再戦, "Saisen"); 489. ? (眼差し, "Manazashi"); 490. ? (ギブソンの予言, "Gibuson no Yogen"); 491. ? (セオリーよりも, "Seorī Yori Mo"); 492. ? (偉大な男, "Idai Na Otoko"); 493. ? (本物の好敵手, "Honmono no Kōtekishu"); 494. ? (不完全燃焼, "Fukanzen Nenshō"); 495. ? (振り出し, "Furidashi"); 496. ? (あと一人, "Ato Ichi Nin"); 497. ? (成長の証, "Seichō no Akashi")
54	June 16, 2005	4-09-127234-7
498. "Maximum" (マキシマム, "Makishimamu"); 499. "Vow" (誓い, "Chikai"); 500. "Again" (ふたたび, "Futatabi"); 501. "Time of Rivals" (好敵手（ライバル）達の時間, "Kōtekishu (Raibaru) Tachi no Jikan"); 502. "A Sudden Chance" (突然のチャンス, "Totsuzen no Chansu"); 503. "You Don't Know Anything" (なんもわかってない, "Nan Mo Wakatte Nai"); 504. "The Relationship of The Two" (二人の温度差, "Ni Nin no Ondo Sa"); 505. "A Confession After 10 Years" (10年目の告白, "10 Nen Me no Kokuhaku"); 506. "Batting Pitcher" (バッティングピッチャー, "Battingu Picchā"); 507. "Crossing Paths" (すれ違い, "Surechigai")
55	August 8, 2005	4-09-127235-5
508. ? (代表結集, "Daihyō Kesshū"); 509. ? (裏方の仕事, "Urakata no Shigoto"); 510. ? (コジローの実力, "Kojirō no Jitsuryoku"); 511. ? (試行錯誤, "Shikōsakugo"); 512. ? (吾郎vs.松尾, "Gorō vs. Matsuo"); 513. ? (吾郎の決意, "Gorō no Ketsui"); 514. ? (先駆者（パイオニア）の助言（アドバイス）, "Senku Sha (Paionia) no Jogen (Adobaisu)"); 515. ? (新しい決め球, "Atarashī Kimedama"); 516. ? (吾郎vs.日本代表, "Gorō vs. Nippon Daihyō"); 517. ? (ジャイロフォーク, "Jairo Fōku")
56	November 18, 2005	4-09-127236-3
518. ? (誤算と不協和音, "Gosan To Fukyōwaon"); 519. ? (ぶつかり合い, "Butsukari Ai"); 520. ? (攻めのリード, "Zeme no Rīdo"); 521. ? (開き直りの1球？, "Hirakinaori no 1 Kyū?"); 522. ? ("無欲"の直球（ストレート）, "'Muyoku' no Chokkyū (Sutorēto)"); 523. ? (あたしも...!!, "Atashi Mo...!!"); 524. ? (再びの渡米, "Futatabi no Tobei"); 525. ? (清水の勇気, "Shimizu no Yūki"); 526. ? (突然の通達, "Totsuzen no Tsūtatsu"); 527. ? (11人目の投手, "11 Nin Me no Tōshu")
57	January 14, 2006	4-09-120027-3
528. ? (招集の裏で..., "Shōshū no Ura De..."); 529. ? (決勝T（トーナメント）への道, "Kesshō T (Tōnamento) He no Michi"); 530. ? (2次リーグ開幕, "2 Ji Rīgu Kaimaku"); 531. ? (初回の攻防, "Shokai no Kōbō"); 532. ? (シルヴァの力, "Shiruva no Chikara"); 533. ? (重圧と真価, "Jūatsu To Shinka"); 534. ? (傾いた流れ, "Katamui Ta Nagare"); 535. ? (課された使命, "Kasa Re Ta Shimei"); 536. ? (磨かれた牙, "Migaka Re Ta Kiba"); 537. ? (試合の風向き, "Shiai no Kazamuki")
58	April 18, 2006	4-09-120327-2
538. ? (切り札, "Kirifuda"); 539. ? (無心の一打, "Mushin no Ichida"); 540. ? (油断の代償, "Yudan no Daishō"); 541. ? (不協和音, "Fukyōwaon"); 542. ? (守護神の座, "Shugojin no Za"); 543. ? (夢の片鱗, "Yume no Henrin"); 544. ? (男じゃねえ!!, "Otoko Ja Nē!!"); 545. ? (託された思い, "Takusa Re Ta Omoi"); 546. ? (不測の事態, "Fusoku no Jitai"); 547. ? (決勝を前に, "Kesshō O Mae Ni")
59	June 16, 2006	4-09-120416-3
548. ? (ルールの落とし穴, "Rūru no Otoshiana"); 549. ? (序盤の攻防, "Joban no Kōbō"); 550. ? (動き出した試合, "Ugokidashi Ta Shiai"); 551. ? (遅れてきたルーキー, "Okure Te Ki Ta Rūkī"); 552. ? (呪縛, "Jubaku"); 553. ? (冷静沈着, "Reisei Chinchaku"); 554. ? (つながれた想い, "Tsunaga Re Ta Omoi"); 555. ? (想いをのせた一打, "Omoi O Nose Ta Ichida"); 556. ? (熱戦の果てに, "Nessen no Hate Ni"); 557. ? (その正体は, "Sono Shōtai Ha")
60	September 15, 2006	4-09-120579-8
558. ? (隠された過去, "Kakusa Re Ta Kako"); 559. ? (大丈夫！, "Daijōbu!"); 560. ? (お兄ちゃん！, "Onīchan!"); 561. ? (寿の決意, "Kotobukiya no Ketsui"); 562. ? (兄貴の仕事, "Aniki no Shigoto"); 563. ? (謎のサウスポー, "Nazo no Sausupō"); 564. ? (アマチュアの意地, "Amachua no Iji"); 565. ? (攻撃的野球, "Kōgeki Teki Yakyū"); 566. ? (突破口, "Toppakō"); 567. ? (姿見えずとも, "Sugata Mie Zu Tomo")
