= List of Major volumes (21–40) =

This is a list of chapters for the manga series Major written and illustrated by Takuya Mitsuda. The manga started in the 1994 issue #33 of Weekly Shōnen Sunday on August 3, 1994. The series finished in the 2010 issue #32 of Weekly Shōnen Sunday published on July 7, 2010. Seventy-eight tankōbon volumes were published by Shogakukan. An anime adaptation based on the manga was produced by Studio Hibari and aired on NHK.

== Volume list ==
No.	Release date	ISBN
21	October 17, 1998	4-09-125501-9
178. "Final Battle" (最終対決！, "Saishū Taiketsu!"); 179. "Conclusion" (決着, "Ketchaku); 180. "Rejection" (拒否, "Kyohi"); 181. "Assassin" (刺客, "Shikaku"); 182. "Damn It..." (ちくしょう…, "Chikushō..."); 183. "Determination" (決心, "Kesshin"); 184. "Is it Destiny!?" (運命なのか！？, "Unmei Na no Ka!?"); 185. "Solicitation" (勧誘, "Kanyū"); 186. "It Can't Be Helped..." (仕方ないんだ, "Shikata Nain Da"); 187. "A Little Bit Seriously..." (ちょっと本気で…, "Chotto Honki De...")
22	December 10, 1998	4-09-125502-7
188. "The Selection Starts!" (セレクション開始!!, "Serekushon Kaishi!!"); 189. "The First Hurdle!" (第一関門…!!!, "Dai Ichi Kanmon...!!!"); 190. "The Second Hurdle!" (第二関門…!!!, "Dai Ni Kanmon...!!!"); 191. "The Third Hurdle!" (第三関門…!!!, "Dai San Kanmon...!!!"); 192. "The Fourth Hurdle!" (第四関門…!!!, "Dai Yon Kanmon...!!!"); 193. "Ruthless Challenge!" (非情な勝負！, "Hijō na Shōbu!"); 194. "Thank You..." (ありがとう…, "Arigatō..."); 195. "Final Test" (最終テスト, "Saishū Tesuto"); 196. "Trap" (落とし穴, "Otoshiana"); 197. "He's Not Normal!" (ただ者じゃねえ！, "Tadamono Ja Nē!")
23	March 18, 1999	4-09-125503-5
198. "We've Come This Far!" (ここまできたんだ！, "Koko Made Ki Tan Da!"); 199. "Yeah!" (おっしゃあ!!, "Osshā!!"); 200. "Battle On The Summit!" (頂上決戦!!, "Chōjō Kessen!!"); 201. "Don't Get Surprised!" (驚くなよ！, "Odoroku Na Yo!"); 202. "Decided!" (決めちまえ！, "Kime Chimae!"); 203. "Oh Man" (まいったね, "Maitta Ne"); 204. "And Now..." (今さら…, "Imasara..."); 205. "If You Like It" (好きなことなら, "Suki Na Koto Nara"); 206. "This Might Be It" (だめかもしれねェ, "Dame Kamo Shire Ne?")
24	May 18, 1999	4-09-125504-3
207. "Nothing To Do With You" (関係ねーだろ, "Kankei Nē Daro); 208. "For a Long Time Now" (昔からずっと…, "Mukashi Kara Zutto..."); 209. "First Meeting..." (初顔合わせ…, "Hatsu Kaoawase..."); 210. "The Island of Dreams" (夢島, "Yume Tō"); 211. "Dorm Life" (寮生活, "Ryō Seikatsu"); 212. "The Training Begins!" (練習開始！, "Renshū Kaishi!"); 213. "Antlion Pit!" (アリ地獄！, "Ari Jigoku!"); 214. "The Heartbreaking Hill!" (心臓破りの丘！, "Shinzō Yaburi no Oka!"); 215. "Capital Letter!" (大文字ヤキ！, "Daimonji Yaki!")
25	July 17, 1999	4-09-125505-1
216. "I Won't Die!" (死なねーよ！, "Shi Na Nē Yo!"); 217. "Let's Eat Yakiniku!" (焼き肉食べよう!!, "Yakiniku Tabeyo U!!"); 218. "Dropout" (脱落, "Datsuraku"); 219. "I Won't Lose!" (負けないよ！, "Make Nai Yo!"); 220. "Reasonable" (適性, "Tekisei"); 221. "Goro vs Inui!" (吾郎vs乾, "Gorō vs Inui"); 222. "Failure!?" (不合格!?, "Fu Gōkaku!?"); 223. "Selection" (選択, "Sentaku"); 224. "Don't Underestimate Him!" (甘くみるな！, "Amaku Miru Na!")
26	October 18, 1999	4-09-125506-X
225. "Hits In The Dark" (闇夜のノック, "Yamiyo no Nokku"); 226. "Final Test" (修了検定, "Shūryō Kentei"); 227. "Major Deduction" (大減点, "Dai Genten"); 228. "Catcher's Game" (インサイドワーク, "Insaido Wāku"); 229. "I Won't Leave" (帰れませんよ, "Kaere Masen Yo"); 230. "He's The Only One..." (あいつだけは…, "Aitsu Dake Ha..."); 231. "That's Enough!" (いい加減にしろ!!, "Ī Kagen ni Shiro!!"); 232. "It Can't Be!?" (まさか!?, "Masaka!?"); 233. "Hold Them Back!" (抑えろ！, "Osaero!"); 234. "The Birth of a Monster!" (怪物誕生！, "Kaibutsu Tanjō!")
27	January 18, 2000	4-09-125507-8
235. "Goodbye, Dream Island" (さらば夢島, "Saraba Yume Tō"); 236. "A New World" (新天地, "Shintenchi"); 237. "The Scholarship Group" (特待生組, "Tokutai Sei Gumi"); 238. "Welcome Game" (歓迎試合, "Kangei Shiai"); 239. "Unpleasant Baseball" (不愉快な野球, "Fuyukai Na Yakyū"); 240. "Toshiya's Counterattack" (逆襲の寿也, "Gyakushū no Kotobukiya"); 241. "Full Throttle!?" (エンジン全開!?, "Enjin Zenkai!?"); 242. "Fierce Attack" (猛攻, "Mōkō"); 243. "Pitcher Change" (投手交代, "Tōshu Kōtai")
28	March 18, 2000	4-09-125508-6
244. "The Hero Takes The Mound" (主役登板, "Shuyaku Tōban"); 245. "How Frustrating!" (ムカツク！, "Mukatsuku!"); 246. "The Rival Appears" (あらわれた宿敵, "Araware Ta Shukuteki"); 247. "Raging Counterattack" (怒涛の反撃, "Dotō no Hangeki"); 248. "Knuckleballer" (ナックル使い, "Nakkuru Dukai"); 249. "Break it Down!" (打ち崩せ！, "Uchikuzuse!"); 250. "Dream Island's Spirit" (夢島魂, "Yume Tō Tamashii"); 251. "Walk The Walk" (有言実行, "Yū Gen Jikkō"); 252. "Goro vs Kaido's Baseball" (吾郎VS海堂野球部, "Gorō vs Kaidō Yakyū Bu")
29	May 18, 2000	4-09-125509-4
253. "All Out Duel" (真剣勝負…, "Shinken Shōbu..."); 254. "Gyroball" (ジャイロボール, "Jairo Bōru"); 255. "The Backside of the Manual!?" (裏マニュアル!?, "Ura Manyuaru!?"); 256. "A Bluff!?" (ハッタリ!?, "Hattari!?"); 257. "How Frustrating!" (悔しいよ!!, "Kuyashī Yo!!"); 258. "Actor" (役者, "Yakusha"); 259. "Roaring Arm!" (うなる右腕, "Unaru Uwan"); 260. "Evolution" (進化, "Shinka"); 261. "All Together!" (一緒に!!, "Issho Ni!!")
30	July 18, 2000	4-09-125510-8
262. "Possibility" (可能性, "Kanō Sei"); 263. "Locker Room" (ロッカールーム, "Rokkā Rūmu"); 264. "Capability!?" (敏腕!?, "Binwan!?"); 265. "Childhood" (原風景, "Gen Fūkei"); 266. "Voice" (声, "Goe"); 267. "No Way!?" (まさか!?, "Masaka!?"); 268. "Chance" (機会（チャンス）, "Kikai (Chansu)"); 269. "Tactics" (策略, "Sakurya Ku"); 270. "Merchandise" (商品, "Shōhin")
31	September 18, 2000	4-09-126081-0
271. "Resolve" (決意, "Ketsui"); 272. "Heart" (心, "Shin"); 273. "Curriculum" (カリキュラム, "Karikyuramu"); 274. "Solitary Confinement" (独房, "Dokubō"); 275. "Crack" (亀裂, "Kiretsu"); 276. "Cleats" (スパイク, "Supaiku"); 277. "Reconnaissance" (偵察, "Teisatsu"); 278. "In Order To Beat Them" (倒すために。, "Taosu Tame Ni."); 279. "Infinite Possibilities" (無限の可能性, "Mugen no Kanō Sei")
32	November 18, 2000	4-09-126082-9
280. "Goro's True Worth" (吾郎の真価, "Gorō no Shinka"); 281. "Resolve" (覚悟, "Kakugo"); 282. "Dark Clouds" (暗雲, "Anun"); 283. "Invincible Arm" (無敵の豪腕, "Muteki no Gō Ude"); 284. "Runaway" (暴走, "Bōsō"); 285. "Favor" (頼み, "Tanomi"); 286. "Absolute Sacrifice" (絶体絶命, "Zettaizetsumei"); 287. "Goro vs Sengoku" (吾郎VS千石, "Gorō VS Sengoku"); 288. "Goro's True Intention" (吾郎の真意, "Gorō no Shini")
33	January 18, 2001	4-09-126083-7
289. "Good Bye" (あばよ。, "Abayo."); 290. "Farewell" (せんべつ, "Senbetsu"); 291. "I'm Not The Only One" (俺だけじゃねえ, "Ore Dake Ja Nē"); 292. "Working War" (バイト大作戦, "Baito Dai Sakusen"); 293. "The Warning of The Riverbank" (江頭の脅迫, "Egashira no Kyōhaku"); 294. "No Matter How Old You Are" (いくつになっても, "Ikutsu Ni Natte Mo"); 295. "There Is!" (いるよ, "Iru Yo"); 296. "Into Seishuu High" (聖秀学院編入, "Hijiri Shigeru Gakuin Hennyū"); 297. "Ace Forth Batter" (エースで四番, "Ēsu De Yon Ban")
34	March 17, 2001	4-09-126084-5
298. "Its Only" (ただの…, "Tada No"); 299. "A Reckless Gamble" (無謀な賭, "Mubō Na To"); 300. "I Guess..." (さあな, "Sāna"); 301. "Yamada Ichirou" (山田一郎, "Yamada Ichirō"); 302. "Warming Up" (ウォーミングアップ, "Uōminguappu"); 303. "Amazing" (すげえな, "Sugēna"); 304. "Catcher Fuji" (キャッチャー藤井, "Kyacchā Fujī"); 305. "The Hot Corner Guy" (ホットコーナーの男, "Hotto Kōnā no Otoko"); 306. "I'm Tired!" (飽きたんだよ！, "Akitan Da Yo!"); 307. "The Past of Tashiro" (田代の過去, "Tashiro no Kako")
35	May 18, 2001	4-09-126085-3
308. "I Don't Want to Anymore!" (ヤなんだよ!!, "Ya Nanda Yo!!"); 309. "But..." (でもな, "Demo Na"); 310. "Reserved Baseball Field" (専用グラウンド, "Senyō Guraundo"); 311. "Our Baseball Field" (俺達のグラウン, "Ore Tachi no Guraun"); 312. "Interim Coach Appears!" (臨時コーチ登場, "Rinji Kōchi Tōjō"); 313. "True Glory" (本物の栄光, "Honmono no Eikō"); 314. "Eminent First Step" (新たなる一歩, "Arata Naru Ichi Ho"); 315. "Me Too" (俺だって, "Ore Datte"); 316. "Miyazaki" (宮崎, "Miyazaki"); 317. "An Unexpected Visitor" (突然の訪問者, "Totsuzen no Hōmon Sha")
36	August 9, 2001	4-09-126086-1
318. "The Rumored Goro Shigeno" (噂の茂野吾郎, "Uwasa no Shigeno Gorō"); 319. "Everyone's Youth" (それぞれの春, "Sorezore no Haru"); 320. "Disproportionate Measures!?" (分不相応!?, "Bun Fusōō!?"); 321. "The Match Against The Second Team Begins!" (海堂二軍戦開始!!, "Kaidō Ni Gun Sen Kaishi!!"); 322. "The Opening Stages" (序盤戦, "Joban Sen"); 323. "If That's What You Want..." (その気なら, "Sono Ki Nara"); 324. "Team" (チーム, "Chīmu"); 325. "What You Can Do" (できること, "Dekiru Koto"); 326. "Assassin" (刺客, "Shikaku"); 327. "An Uninvited Guest" (招かれざる客, "Maneka Re Zaru Kyaku")
37	November 18, 2001	4-09-126087-X
328. "Seishu Without Goro" (吾郎なき聖秀, "Gorō Naki Hijiri Shigeru"); 329. "Siblings" (姉弟, "Ane Otōto"); 330. "Ten Years From Now" (10年先, "10 Nen Saki"); 331. "Don't You Worry" (心配ねえよ, "Shinpai Nē Yo"); 332. "The Bracket Has Been Decided!" (組み合わせ決定！, "Kumiawase Kettei!"); 333. "The Curtain Rises" (開幕, "Kaimaku"); 334. "The First Game Begins!" (一回戦開始!!, "Ichi Kaisen Kaishi!!"); 335. "Fighting Spirit" (闘う意思, "Tatakau Ishi"); 336. "Contagious" (伝染, "Densen"); 337. "Batter #5, First Baseman Miyazaki" (５番ファースト宮崎, "5 Ban Fāsuto Miyazaki")
38	January 18, 2002	4-09-126088-8
338. "Something You Love" (好きなことなら, "Suki na Koto Nara"); 339. "If I Feel Like It" (気が向いたなら, "Ki Ga Mui Ta Nara"); 340. "Let's Win!" (勝とうぜ！, "Kato Uze!"); 341. "The Wounded Ace" (手負いのエース, "Teoi no Ēsu"); 342. "Last Inning" (ラストイニング, "Rasuto Iningu"); 343. "Tell Me" (教えてくれよ, "Oshie Te Kure Yo"); 344. "Mother and Child" (母と子, "Haha To Ko"); 345. "The Mifune Game's Prelude" (三船戦の朝, "Mifune Sen no Asa"); 346. "The Mifune Game Begins" (三船戦開始!!, "Mifune Sen Kaishi!!"); 347. "Starting Pitcher, Taiga Shimizu!" (先発・清水大河！, "Senpatsu. Shimizu Taiga!")
39	April 18, 2002	4-09-126089-6
348. "Mid-Game Offense and Defense" (中盤戦の攻防, "Chūban Sen no Kōbō"); 349. "What Is This!?" (なんなんだ!?, "Nannanda!?"); 350. "Substitution" (選手交代, "Senshu Kōtai"); 351. "The First Chance" (初めてのチャンス, "Hajimete no Chansu"); 352. "An Opening Appears!" (開け！ 突破口, "Ake! Toppakō"); 353. "The Game is Just Beginning" (勝負はこれから, "Shōbu ha Korekara"); 354. "Not Until I Pass!" (俺までまわせ!!, "Ore Made Mawa Se!!"); 355. "True Feelings" (ホントの気持ち, "Honto no Kimochi"); 356. "Only With Him" (あいつとだけは, "Aitsu to Dake ha"); 357. "Until We Take The Lead" (勝ち越すまでは, "Kachikosu Made ha")
40	May 18, 2002	4-09-126090-X
358. "Extinguishing the Fire" (火消し, "Hikeshi"); 359. "Full Swing!!" (フルスイング!!, "Furusuingu!!"); 360. "Sweat and Tears" (涙も汗も, "Namida Mo Ase Mo"); 361. "Completely Motivated" (やる気まんまん, "Yaruki Manman"); 362. "Look At Me, Kaido" (見てろよ海堂!!, "Mi Tero Yo Kaidō!!"); 363. "Scout Meeting" (スカウト会議!!, "Sukauto Kaigi!!"); 364. "The Slider's Menace" (脅威のスライダー, "Kyōi no Suraidā"); 365. "A Clue To Its Defeat" (攻略の糸口, "Kōrya ku no Itoguchi"); 366. "The Road To Kaido" (海堂戦への道, "Kaidō Sen he no Michi"); 367. "The Kuriyama Game Begins!" (久里山戦開始!!, "Kuriyama Sen Kaishi!!")
