= List of Major volumes (1–20) =

This is a list of chapters for the manga series Major written and illustrated by Takuya Mitsuda. The manga started in the 1994 issue #33 of Weekly Shōnen Sunday on August 3, 1994. The series finished in the 2010 issue #32 of Weekly Shōnen Sunday published on July 7, 2010. Seventy-eight tankōbon volumes were published by Shogakukan. An anime adaptation based on the manga was produced by Studio Hibari and aired on NHK.

== Volume list ==
No.	Release date	ISBN
1	January 13, 1995	4-09-123491-7
001. "Goro's Dream" (吾郎の夢, "Gorō no Yume"); 002. "Switch" (転向, "Tenkō"); 003. "First Meeting" (初めての出会い, "Hajimete no Deai"); 004. "Playing Catch" (キャッチボール, "Kyacchibōru"); 005. "Second Baseball Career" (第二の人生, "Dai Ni no Jinsei"); 006. "Friendship" (友情, "Yūjō"); 007. "Little League" (リトルリーグ, "Ritoru Rīgu"); 008. "Vs. Little League" (VS.リトルリーグ, "VS. Ritoru Rīgu")
2	April 18, 1995	4-09-123492-5
009. "Misunderstanding" (誤解, "Gokai"); 010. "First String Battle" (一軍戦, "Ichigun Sen"); 011. "A Big Job" (大仕事, "Dai Shigoto"); 012. "Parents' Example" (親の背中, "Oya no Senaka"); 013. "The Zoo" (動物園, "Dōbutsu En"); 014. "A Birthday One Day Late" (一日遅れの誕生日, "Ichi Nichi Okure no Tanjō Bi"); 015. "An Uncooperative Superstar" (超大物、来日!!, "Chō Ōmono, Rainichi!!"); 016. "Gibson's Up" (キブソン登板, "Kibuson Tōban"); 017. "Major Skills" (メジャーの実力, "Mejā no Jitsuryoku")
3	June 17, 1995	4-09-123493-3
018. "Home Run" (ホームラン, "Hōmuran"); 019. "Gibson is Desperate" (ギブソン焦燥, "Gibuson Shōsō"); 020. "Hit by Pitch" (死紙, "Shi Shi"); 021. "Sudden Event" (予期せぬ出来事, "Yoki Se Nu Dekigoto"); 022. "The Depths of Sorrow" (悲しみの淵, "Kanashimi no Fuchi"); 023. "World's First Love" (世界一の愛, "Sekaiichi no Ai"); 024. "A New Semester Begins" (新しい春, "Atarashī Haru"); 025. "Second-Rate Sport" (マイナースポーツ, "Mainā Supōtsu")
4	July 18, 1995	4-09-123494-1
026. "Rebuilding Little League" (リトル再建, "Ritoru Saiken"); 027. "Pilfer" (万引き, "Manbiki"); 028. "School Violence" (いじめの構図, "Ijime no Kōzu"); 029. "The Bullied Victim Retaliates" (イジメられっ子の反乱, "Ijime Rare Kko no Hanran"); 030. "From Now On We Are Friends" (今日から友達, "Kyō Kara Tomodachi"); 031. "Baseball Practice Field" (バッティングセンター, "Battingu Sentā"); 032. "First Match Appearance" (初めての試合, "Hajimete no Shiai"); 033. "Genius Baseball Youth" (天才野球少年, "Tensai Yakyū Shōnen"); 034. "One-Man Show" (独り相撲, "Hitori Sumō")
5	October 18, 1995	4-09-123495-X
035. "Teamwork" (チームワーク, "Chīmuwāku"); 036. "Desperate Base Run" (必死の出塁, "Hisshi no Shutsurui"); 037. "Wet Mound" (雨のマウンド, "Ame no Maundo"); 038. "Just One More Inning" (もう1イニング, "Mō ichi Iningu"); 039. "Together Forever" (ずっと一緒に!!, "Zutto Issho Ni!!"); 040. "Unexpected Twist" (どんでん返し, "Dondengaeshi"); 041. "The Best Team" (一流のチーム, "Ichiryū no Chīmu"); 042. "Reunited After 3 Years" (3年ぶりの再会, "3 Nen Buri no Saikai")
6	December 9, 1995	4-09-123496-8
043. "Dad's First Team" (おとさんのいたチーム, "Oto-san no Ita Chīmu"); 044. "A Mother's Love" (母の想い, "Haha no Omoi"); 045. "Dad's Shadow" (おとさんの影, "Oto-san no Kage"); 046. "Going Forward" (前を向いて・・・!!, "Mae o Mui Te...!!"); 047. "A Written Invitation from Gibson" (ギブソンからの招待状, "Gibuson Kara no Shōtai Jō"); 048. "To See With My Own Eyes" (この目で確かめたいから!!, "Kono Me De Tashikame Tai Kara!!"); 049. "Here I come, America!!" (いざアメリカ!!, "Iza Amerika!!"); 050. "The Baseball All-Star Game Begins!!" (球宴、始まる!!, "Kyūen, Hajimaru!!"); 051. "Straight Ball Challenge!!" (直球勝負!!, "Chokkyū Shōbu!!")
7	February 17, 1996	4-09-123497-6
052. See You Again; 053. "Out of Place!?" (場違い!?, "Bachigai!?"); 054. "Fat Power" (「デブ」の実力, "'Debu' no Jitsuryoku"); 055. "The Beginning of the Practice Match" (練習試合、開始, "Renshū Shiai, Kaishi"); 056. "From the Left Side!?" (左打席!?, "Hidari Daseki!?"); 057. "Winning Shot" (ウイニング・ショット, "Uiningu.Shotto"); 058. "Variation!?" (変調!?, "Henchō!?"); 059. "The Aftereffects of Accidents" (事故の後遺症, "Jiko no Kōishō"); 060. "A Challenge for Yokohama Little" (横浜リトルへの挑戦状, "Yokohama Ritoru He no Chōsen Jō")
8	May 18, 1996	4-09-123498-4
061. "Impulsive Wager" (無謀な賭け, "Mubō Na Kake"); 062. "Cheating Pitcher" (インチキ投手, "Inchiki Tōshu"); 063. "Coach Kashimoto's Reflection" (樫本監督の回想, "Kashimoto Kantoku no Kaisō"); 064. "Match Suspended" (試合中止, "Shiai Chūshi"); 065. "Coach's Thoughts" (監督の思い, "Kantoku no Omoi"); 066. "The Marathon Challenge" (挑戦！マラソン, "Chōsen! Marason"); 067. "Why Am I This Nervous?" (なぜかドキ!!, "Naze ka Doki!!"); 068. "The Girl Pitcher" (女性ピッチャー, "Josei Picchā"); 069. "Nocturnal Ping-Pong" (夜の卓球, "Yoru no Takkyū")
9	July 18, 1996	4-09-123499-2
070. "The End Of The Training Camp" (合宿最終日, "Gasshuku Saishū Bi"); 071. "I Quit!" (ヤメタ！, "Yameta!"); 072. "Shimizu's Paper" (清水の作文, "Shimizu no Sakubun"); 073. "White Dots on a Blue Sky" (青い空に白い点！, "Aoi Sora Ni Shiroi Ten!"); 074. "Autumn Tournament" (秋の大会, "Aki no Taikai"); 075. "The First Game!" (第一試合！, "Dai Ichi Shiai!"); 076. "The Opponent's Strength" (敵の実力, "Teki no Jitsuryoku"); 077. "The Black Triangle!!" (ブラック トライアングル!!, "Burakku Toraianguru!!"); 078. "Black Attack Force!" (ブラックの攻撃力！, "Burakku no Kōgeki Ryoku!")
10	October 18, 1996	4-09-123500-X
079. "First Run" (先取点！, "Senshu Ten!"); 080. "Fine Play!" (ファインプレー！, "Fainpurē!"); 081. "The Last Batter" (最後の打者, "Saigo no Dasha"); 082. "The Enemy's Flaw" (敵の穴, "Teki no Ana"); 083. "First Victory?" (初勝利!?, "Hatsu Shōri!?); 084. "Victory Night" (勝利の夜, "Shōri no Yoru"); 085. "Shigeno's Feelings" (茂野の気持ち, "Shigeno no Kimochi"); 086. "Momoka's Feelings" (桃子の気持ち, "Momoko no Kimochi"); 087. "The Second Game" (二回線, "Ni Kaisen")
11	January 18, 1997	4-09-125151-X
088. "Komori's Injured!" (小森リタイヤ！, "Komori Ritaiya!"); 089. "Sawamura is the Pitcher!" (ピッチャー沢村, "Picchā Sawamura"); 090. "Back Home!" (バックホーム！, "Bakku Hōmu!"); 091. "How is a Forkball Thrown?" (フォークの打ち方？, "Fōku no Uchi Kata?"); 092. "Kyuta and His Dad" (球太と父親, "Kyūta to Chichioya"); 093. "A Robot?" (ロボット!?, "Robotto!?"); 094. "Denying Change!" (交代拒否！, "Kōtai Kyohi!"); 095. "This is Baseball!" (これが野球！, "Kore ga Yakyū!"); 096. "Choosing the Catcher" (キャッチャー選抜, "Kyacchā Senbatsu")
12	March 18, 1997	4-09-125152-8
097. "The Will To Go Through With It" (やる気ある？, "Yaruki Aru?"); 098. "Changing Coaches" (監督交替, "Kantoku Kōtai"); 099. "The Difference in Skill" (実力の差, "Jitsuryoku no Sa"); 100. "Counterattack!" (反撃だ！！, "Hangeki Da!!"); 101. "Here It Is, The Home Run!" (出た！ホームラン, "Deta! Hōmuran"); 102. "The Counterattack Continues!" (攻撃は続く!!, "Kōgeki Ha Tsuduku!!"); 103. "Changing Catchers" (保守交替, "Hoshu Kōtai"); 104. "Nice Read!" (好リード！, "Kō Rīdo!"); 105. "The Secret Weapon's Real Form!" (秘密兵器の正体！, "Himitsu Heiki no Shōtai!")
13	May 17, 1997	4-09-125153-6
106. "Changeup!" (チェンジ アップ！, "Chenji Appu!"); 107. "The Coach Returns" (遅れて来た監督, "Okure Te Ki Ta Kantoku"); 108. "Let Her Walk?" (敬遠策!?, "Keien Saku!?"); 109. "To The Extra Innings!" (延長戦突入!!, "Enchō Sen Totsunyū!!"); 110. "I Don't Care Anymore..." (もう気にならねえ…, "Mō Ki Ni Nara Nē..."); 111. "Goro's Determination" (吾郎の覚悟, "Gorō no Kakugo"); 112. "Something Important" (大事なこと, "Daiji na Koto"); 113. "Inner Strength" (底知れぬ力, "Soko Shire Nu Chikara"); 114. "I Don't Want to Run Away!!" (逃げたくない!!, "Nige Taku Nai!!")
14	July 18, 1997	4-09-125154-4
115. "Obsessing Over The Run" (執念の激走, "Shūnen no Gekisō"); 116. "It's Not a Dream!" (夢じゃない!!, "Yume ja Nai!!"); 117. "Shigeno and Goro" (茂野と吾郎, "Shigeno to Gorō"); 118. "New Bonds" (新しい絆, "Atarashī Kizuna"); 119. "Don't Say Goodbye" (さよならは言わない, "Sayonara wa Iwanai"); 120. "Friend's Reunion" (親友再会, "Shinyū Saikai"); 121. "Komori's Suffering" (小森の悩み, "Komori no Nayami"); 122. "Goro's Confidence" (吾郎の自信, "Gorō no Jishin"); 123. "Goro's Secret" (吾郎の秘密, "Gorō no Himitsu")
15	September 18, 1997	4-09-125155-2
124. "Another Rupture" (もう絶交!?, "Mō Zekkō!?"); 125. "Traitors" (裏切り, "Uragiri"); 126. "A Single Dream" (夢は一つ, "Yume ha Hitotsu"); 127. "Brief Happiness" (つかの間の喜び, "Tsukanoma no Yorokobi"); 128. "Truly Angry" (マジギレ, "Majigire"); 129. "Clash! Goro and Yamane!" (吾郎と山根、激突!!, "Gorō To Yamane, Gekitotsu!!"); 130. "If You Like It, Don't Give Up" (好きなら、あきらめんな, "Suki Nara, Akiramen Na"); 131. "A Game All of a Sudden?" (いきなり試合!?, "Ikinari Shiai!?"); 132. "A Test!?" (練習台!?, "Renshū Dai!?")
16	November 18, 1997	4-09-125156-0
133. "The Hero Returns" (帰ってきた勇姿, "Kaette Ki Ta Yūshi"); 134. "Everyone's Determination" (皆の決意, "Mina no Ketsui"); 135. "Rebellion!?" (造反!?, "Zōhan!?"); 136. "The Traps of Friendship!?" (友情のワナ!?, "Yūjō no Wana!?"); 137. "Breaking the Ice!?" (雪解け間近!?, "Yukidoke Majika!?"); 138. "Towards Enemy Territory!" (敵地へ, "Teki Chi He"); 139. "The West's Objective!" (西中の狙い, "Nishichū no Nerai"); 140. "Dangerous Bases" (危険な塁上, "Kiken Na Rui Jō"); 141. "A Blast!?" (決裂!?, "Ketsuretsu!?")
17	February 18, 1998	4-09-125157-9
142. "Komori's Beliefs" (小森の執念, "Komori no Shūnen"); 143. "The Fruit of Hard Work!?" (成果は上々!?, "Seika ha Jōjō!?"); 144. "Something is Off!?" (何かが変だぞ!?, "Nani Ka Ga Hen Da Zo!?"); 145. "A Father's Figure" (父の姿, "Chichi no Sugata"); 146. "Another Genius" (もう一人の天才, "Mō Hitori no Tensai"); 147. "Rival: Toshiya Sato's Determination!" (佐藤寿也の決意!!, "Satō Toshiya no Ketsui!!"); 148. "An Encounter After Four Years" (４年ぶりの再会, "4 Nen Buri no Saikai"); 149. "Goro's Flaw" (吾郎の欠陥, "Gorō no Kekkan"); 150. "Faulty Fastball" (棒球, "Bō Dama")
18	April 18, 1998	4-09-125158-7
151. "Goro's Transformation" (吾郎の変身, "Gorō no Henshin"); 152. "It's Not That Easy!" (打ち損じじゃない…!!, "Uchi Sonji Ja Nai...!!"); 153. "Teamwork" (チームワーク, "Chīmuwāku"); 154. "To Become One..." (ひとつになって…, "Hitotsu Ni Natte"); 155. "Mifune East's Miracle" (三船東の奇跡, "Mifune-higashi no Kiseki"); 156. "Turning the Tables" (逆…転…, "Gyaku... Ten..."); 157. "Toshiya's Past" (寿也の過去, "Toshiya no Kako"); 158. "Shimizu's Firing Up" (清水のハッパ, "Shimizu no Happa"); 159. "The Overwhelming Strength of Seibukan" (強豪・青武館, "Kyōgō. Seibukan")
19	June 18, 1998	4-09-125159-5
160. "Just What Is It!?" (何者だ！？, "Nani Mono Da!?"); 161. "It Can't Be!" (そんなバカな！？, "Sonna Bakana!?"); 162. "How Could Someone Like That Exist!?" (なんてやつだ！？, "Nante Yatsuda!?"); 163. "Scouts" (スカウト, "Sukauto"); 164. "Declaration of War" (宣戦布告, "Sensen Fukoku"); 165. "First Batter" (ファーストバトル, "Fāsuto Batoru"); 166. "Strategy" (術中…, "Jucchū..."); 167. "Walked!?" (敬遠…！？, "Keien...!?"); 168. "A Duel Between Men!" (男の勝負！！, "Otoko no Shōbu!!")
20	August 8, 1998	4-09-125160-9
169. "Disturbance...!?" (動揺……！？, "Dōyō...!?"); 170. "Miscalculation" (誤算, "Gosan"); 171. "What for!?" (何のために！？, "Nan no Tame Ni!?"); 172. "This is it!" (これでおわりだ！, "Kore De Owari Da!"); 173. "Last Resort" (最後の手段, "Saigo no Shudan"); 174. "Last Chance" (ラストチャンス, "Rasuto Chansu"); 175. "Last Inning, Two Outs" (最終回二死, "Saishū Kai Nishi"); 176. "Push Forward!" (押せ押せ！, "Ose Ose!"); 177. "Last Ball！" (ラストボール!!, "Rasuto Bōru!!")
