= List of Major 2nd volumes =

This is a list of chapters for the manga series Major 2nd, written by Takuya Mitsuda and serialized in Weekly Shōnen Sunday. The first chapter appeared in a 2015 issue; Over one hundred and fifty chapters have been published as of September 15, 2018.

== Volume list ==
No.	Release date	ISBN
1	June 12, 2015	978-4-09-126158-8
001. "Daigo's Dream" (大吾の夢, "Daigo no Yume"); 002. "If Only I Wasn't The Next Generation..." (2世でさえなければ, "2 Sei de Sae Nakere ba"); 003. "Why He Quit" (やめた理由, "Yame ta Riyū"); 004. "Hikaru's Abilities" (光の実力, "Hikari no Jitsuryoku"); 005. "The Potential of the New Generation" (二世の潜在能力, "Ni Sei no Senzai Nōryoku "); 006. "Damn it!" (ちくしょお！, "Chiku Shoo!"); 007. "Farewell Hit" (一打サヨナラ！, "Ichi da Sayonara!"); 008. "I Don't Want to Hear It From You!" (おまえが言うな, "Omae ga iu na")
2	September 18, 2015	978-4-09-126244-8
009. "Talent of Loving Baseball" (野球を好きな才能, "Yakyū o Suki na Sainō"); 010. "Ace's baptism" (エースの洗礼, "Ēsu no Senrei"); 011. "Pitching Test" (ピッチングテスト, "Picchingu Tesuto"); 012. "Accompany Me" (付き合ってよ, "Tsukiatte yo"); 013. "Special Training Starts?" (特訓開始？, "Tokkun Kaishi?"); 014. "I'll Look Back at You!" (見返してやる！, "Mikaeshi te Yaru!"); 015. "Batting Center's Special Training" (バッセン特訓, "Bassen Tokkun"); 016. "Catcher's Charm" (捕手の魅力, "Hoshu no Miryoku"); 017. "A Reunion Without Smiles" (笑顔なき再会, "Egao Naki Saikai")
3	December 12, 2015	978-4-09-126244-8
018. "It's a Lie!!" (うそだ！, "Uso da!"); 019. "One Day, Without Fail" (いつか必ず, "Itsuka Kanarazu"); 020. "You're Ten Years Too Early!" (10年早いよ, "10-Nen Hayai yo"); 021. "Private Lesson" (個人レッスン, "Kojin Ressun"); 022. "New Life" (新しい生活, "Atarashī Seikatsu"); 023. "Play Ball!!" (プレイボール!!, "Purei Bōru!!"); 024. "The Coach's Trust" (監督の信頼, "Kantoku no Shinrai"); 025. "Mistake after Mistake" (ミスの連鎖, "Misu no Rensa"); 026. "Urabe's Melancholy" (卜部の憂鬱, "Urabe no Yūutsu")
4	March 18, 2016	978-4-09-126820-4
027. "Crow-hop" (クロウホップ, "Kurō Hoppu"); 028. "The Main Forces Pride" (主力のプライド, "Shuryoku no Puraido"); 029. "One More Person" (あと1人!, "Ato 1-ri!"); 030. "Get It Back!" (取り返せ!, "Torikaese!"); 031. "What You Can Do Now" (今できること, "Imadekirukoto"); 032. "A Last Moment Battery" (急造バッテリー, "Kyūzō Batterī"); 033. "Urgent Pitching" (緊急登板, "Kinkyū Tōban"); 034. "A Beginner Battery" (初心者バッテリー, "Shoshinsha batterī"); 035. "Daigos Decision" (大吾の判断, "Daigo no Handan")
5	July 12, 2016	978-4-09-127167-9
036. "The Joy of Winning" (勝つ悦び, "Katsu Yorokobi"); 037. "Weekday Practice" (平日練習, "Heijitsu Renshū"); 038. "Yesterdays Practice" (前日練習, "Zenjitsu Renshū"); 039. "Line-Up Announcement" (スタメン発表, "Sutamen Happyō"); 040. "Stealing Measures" (盗塁対策, "Tōrui Taisaku"); 041. "Catcher Experience" (捕手の経験値, "Hoshu no Keiken-chi"); 042. "Eephus Measures" (イーファス対策, "Īfasu Taisaku"); 043. "Special Shift" (特殊シフト, "Tokushu Shifuto"); 044. "Clue for Attack" (攻略の手がかり, "Kōryaku no Tegakari")
6	September 16, 2016	978-4-09-127374-1
045. "Emergency?" (緊急事態?, "Kinkyū Jitai?"); 046. "A Battery's Breath" (バッテリーの呼吸, "Batterī no Kokyū"); 047. "The Battery's Decision" (バッテリーの選択, "Batterī no Sentaku"); 048. "Courtesy and Responsibility" (礼儀と責任, "Reigi to Sekinin"); 049. "A Changed Pace" (変わった流れ, "Kawatta Nagare"); 050. "Trump Card" (切り札, "Kirifuda"); 051. "Turnabout Victory" (逆転勝利, "Gyakuten Shōri"); 052. "To Take You Down" (おまえを倒すため, "Omae o Taosu Tame"); 053. "The Mayumura Generation" (眉村世代, "Mayumura Sedai")
7	November 18, 2016	978-4-09-127414-4
054. "Towards the Bigger Match" (大一番に向けて, "Daiichiban ni Mukete"); 055. "Yearning" (憧れ, "Akogare"); 056. "Urabe's Past" (卜部の過去, "Urabe no Kako"); 057. "Bunt against Bunt?" (バンドでバント?, "Bando de Banto?"); 058. "Before the Match" (決戦を前に, "Kessen o mae ni"); 059. "Unexpectations" (予想外, "Yosōgai"); 060. "Strange Feeling" (違和感, "Iwakan"); 061. "Accident" (アクシデント, "Akushidento"); 062. "First Aid" (応急処置, "Ōkyū Shochi")
8	February 17, 2017	978-4-09-127499-1
063. "Number 4's Response" (4番の対応力, "Yonban no Taiōryoku"); 064. "The Motive for Evolution" (進化の理由, "Shinka no Riyū"); 065. "Close Game?" (互角の勝負？, "Gokaku no Shōbu?"); 066. "Hikaru's Stratagem" (光の秘策, "Hikari no Hisaku"); 067. "Fastball Showdown!" (直球勝負, "Chokkyū Shōbu"); 068. "Cut-Off Feelings" (切れた気持ち, "Kireta Kimochi"); 069. "Don't take it!" (ごまかすな！, "Gomakasuna!"); 070. "For Victory's sake" (勝利のために, "Shōri no Tame ni"); 071. "Reliever Effectiveness" (継投策, "Keitōsaku"); 072. "The Counterattack...Begins?" (反撃開始, "Hangeki Kaishi")
9	May 18, 2017	978-4-09-127568-4
073. "Touto Seams" (東斗のほころび, "Higashi to no Hokorobi"); 074. "Pitched Ace" (エース登板, "Eisu Tōban"); 075. "The Coach Awakens" (監督、目覚める。, "Kantoku, Mezameru"); 076. "Latent Power of the Prestige" (名門の底力, "Meimon no Sokojikara"); 077. "Final Chapter...!!" (最終回…!!, "Saishū kai...!!"); 078. "Join from Behind" (うしろに繋げ, "Ushiro ni Tsunage"); 079. "A Battery's Scheme" (バッテリーの秘策, "Batterī no Hisaku"); 080. "Intentional Walk" (敬遠策, "Keien Saku"); 081. "Left Overthrow" (左オーバースロー, "Hidari Ōbāsurō"); 082. "The Last Batter?" (最後の打者?, "Saigo no Dasha?")
10	August 18, 2017	978-4-09-127677-3
083. "Overwhelm!" (しのぎきれ!, "Shinogikire!"); 084. "Do Something" (なんとかしてくれ, "Nantoka Shitekure"); 085. "A Blow of Fate" (運命の一打, "Unmei no Ichi-da"); 086. "It's my fault" (俺のせいだ, "Ore no Sei da"); 087. "You're Lying!!" (うそだ――!!, "Uso da--!!"); 088. "A Sudden Return" (突然の帰国, "Totsuzen no Kikoku"); 089. "Family Outing" (家族でお出かけ, "Kazoku de o Dekake"); 090. "Like I Just Said" (言ったよね, "Itta yo ne"); 091. "The Rumored Newcomer" (噂の新入部員, "Uwasa no Shinnyū Buin"); 092. "Captain Daigo" (キャプテン大吾, "Kyaputen-dai Ware")
11	October 18, 2017	978-4-09-127854-8
093. "Nishina's Confidence" (仁科の自信, "Nishina no Jishin"); 094. "Sounding Each Other" (探り合い, "Saguriai"); 095. "Stop Fooling Around" (ふざけるな!, "Fuzakeru na!"); 096. "Boycott" (ボイコット, "Boikotto"); 097. "The New Team Sails" (新チームの船出, "Shin Chīmu no Funade"); 098. "Tentative Position" (暫定ポジション, "Zantei Pojishon"); 099. "Harsh Catcher" (その捕手、辛口につき, "Sono Hoshu, Karakuchi ni Tsuki"); 100. "Strength Analysis" (戦力分析, "Senryoku Bunseki"); 101. "What's with this Captain" (なんやこの主将, "Nan ya Kono Shushō"); 102. "Before the Opening Game" (開幕を前に, "Kaimaku o Mae ni")
12	January 18, 2018	978-4-09-128075-6
103. "Let's Go!" (さあいこう!, "Sā Ikō!"); 104. "Preemptive Strike" (先制攻撃!, "Sensei Kōgeki!"); 105. "All Girls' Strength" (野球女子の実力, "Yakyū Joshi no Jitsuryoku"); 106. "Rising Up" (立ち上がり, "Tachiagari"); 107. "Captain's Attitude" (キャプテンの姿勢, "Kyaputen no Shisei"); 108. "Torch" (ほころび, "Hokorobi"); 109. "I Screwed Up" (やらかした!, "Yarakashita!"); 110. "Improvement" (上り調子, "Nobori Chōshi"); 111. "Super Mobile Baseball" (超機動力野球, "Chō Kidō-ryoku Yakyū"); 112. "Offense and Defense of the First Inning" (初回の攻防, "Shokai no Kōbō")
13	March 16, 2018	978-4-09-128095-4
113. "Super Lead" (スーパーリード, "Sūpārīdo"); 114. "Test of Endurance" (我慢くらべ, "Gaman Kurabe"); 115. "Respective Growths" (それぞれの成長, "Sorezore no Seichō"); 116. "What I can do now" (今できること, "Imadekirukoto"); 117. "One More Time" (もっかい…, "Mokkai…"); 118. "Not Suitable" (向いてない?, "Muitenai?"); 119. "Next Point" (次の1点, "Tsugi no 1-ten"); 120. "Absolutely Not!" (絶対いやや!, "Zettai Iya ya!"); 121. "Daigo Magic?" (大吾マジック?, "Daigo Majikku?"); 122. "Done For...?" (万事休す…?, "Banjikyūsu…?")
14	June 18, 2018	978-4-09-128258-3
123. "My Mistake" (俺のミスだ, "Ore no misuda"); 124. "Slight Hope" (かすかな望み, "Kasukana Nozomi"); 125. "On Base!!" (塁に出ろ!, "Rui ni Shutsuro!"); 126. "The Last Batter?" (最後のバッター?, "Saigo no Battā?"); 127. "A Captain's Spirit" (キャプテンの意地, "Kyaputen no Iji"); 128. "After the Battle" (戦い終えて, "Tatakai Oete"); 129. "Eihou's Strength" (英邦の実力, "Hidekuni no Jitsuryoku"); 130. "To the Semifinals!" (さあ準決勝!, "Sā Junkesshō!"); 131. "Rising and Standing" (荒れる立ち上がり, "Areru Tachiagari"); 132. "Careless Play" (怠慢プレイ！？, "Taiman Purei! ?")
15	August 17, 2018	978-4-09-128349-8
133. "Inclined Flow" (傾いた流れ, "Katamuita Nagare"); 134. "Ambush Hit" (伏兵の一撃, "Fukuhei no Ichigeki"); 135. "A Sudden Trap?" (思わぬ伏兵?, "Omowanu Fukuhei?"); 136. "Disregarding Theory?" (セオリー無視?, "Seorī Mushi?"); 137. "Direct Confrontation" (真っ向勝負, "Makkō Shōbu"); 138. "Taking the Initiative" (主導権争い, "Shudō-ken Arasoi"); 139. "Pace Allocation" (ペース配分, "Pēsu Haibun"); 140. "Lapsed Feelings" (切れた気持ち, "Kireta Kimochi"); 141. "Perfect Split Style" (完全分業スタイル, "Kanzen Bungyō Sutairu"); 142. "Not Over Yet!!" (まだまだ!!, "Madamada!!")
16	November 16, 2018	978-4-09-128579-9
143. "What I Can Do Now" (今できること, "Ima Dekiru Koto"); 144. "System!!" (繋げ!!, "Tsunage!!"); 145. "Connected Feelings" (繋がった思い, "Tsunagatta Omoi"); 146. "Sure Climb on the Mound" (まさかの登板, "Masakano Tōban"); 147. "Resolving Pitch" (覚悟の投球, "Kakugo no Tōkyū"); 148. "Catched the Flow" (掴みかけた流れ, "Tsukami Kaketa Nagare"); 149. "What is it?" (なんなの？, "Nannano?"); 150. "Girls' Spirit" (女子の意地, "Joshi no Iji"); 151. "Michiru's Past" (道塁の過去, "Michiru no Kakō"); 152. "A Hit of Growth" (成長の一打, "Seichō no Ichida")
17	October 18, 2019	978-4-09-128805-9
153. "If You Come This Far" (ここまで来たら, "Koko Made Kitara"); 154. "Please Tell Me" (教えてよ, "Oshiete yo"); 155. "Nice Game! (ナイスゲーム！, "Naisu Gēmu!"); 156. "Revenge!!" (いざリベンジ!!, "Iza Ribenji!!"); 157. "Hard Pace" (ハードペース, "Hādo Pēsu"); 158. "Failure as Captain" (キャプテン失格, "Kyaputen Shikkaku"); 159. "Restart!" (再始動, "Saishidō"); 160. "A New Member" (新入部員, "Shin Nyūbuin"); 161. "No Way!" (やなこった, "Yanakotta"); 162. "Troublemaker" (トラブルメーカー, "Toraburu Mē kā")
18	January 17, 2020	978-4-09-129542-2
163. "Positive" (積極的・・・, "Sekkyoku Teki"); 164. "The 10th Player?" (10人目の選手？, "Jyūninme no Senshu?"); 165. "To the Practice Game" (練習試合へ, "Renshūshiai e"); 166. "A Humuliating 10-point lead" (屈辱の10点リード, "Kutsujoku no 10-ten Rīdo"); 167. "What's with this team?" (なんだこのチーム？, "Nanda ko no Chīmu?"); 168. "Push!" (押せ押せ, "Ose Ose!"); 169. "I've Misjudged You!!" (見損なったよ！！, "Misokonatta yo!!"); 170. "Habitual Ace" (クセ者エース, "Kusemono Ēsu"); 171. "Mario Ball" (マリオボール, "Mario Bōru"); 172. "Signs of a Storm" (嵐の気配, "Arashi no Kehai")
19	April 16, 2020	978-4-09-850062-8
173. "Game Set?" (ゲームセット？, "Gemmu Setto?"); 174. "The Starter Team Appears!!" (一軍現れるっ!!, "Iggun Arawareru!!"); 175. "Came to the Head" (頭に来てんだ, "Atama ni Kitenda"); 176. "Starting Catcher" (正捕手, "Sei Hoshu"); 177. "The Astonishing No.9" (驚愕の9人目, "Kyōgaku no Kyūninme"); 178. "Hikaru x Mario" (光 X マリオ, "Hikaru x Mario"); 179. "Disturbed Heart" (乱される心, "Midasareru Kokoro"); 180. "Play-house Baseball" (ママごと野球, "Mama-goto Yakyū"); 181. "Before the Storm?" (嵐の前？, "Arashi no Mae?"); 182. "Just Have Fun" (楽しくやるーよ, "Tanoshiku Yaru yo")
20	July 17, 2020	978-4-09-850158-8
183. "The Separated Nine" (バラバラナイン, "Barabaranin"); 184. "Daigo's Motive" (大吾の本音, "Daigo no Honne"); 185. "Midnight Magic" (0時の魔法, "0-Ji no Mahō"); 186. "The Principal's Identity" (校長の正体, "Kōchō no Shotai"); 187. "Compiling Problems" (山積みな問題, "Yamazumina Montai"); 188. "Uncle is Here!" (おじさん登場!, "Oji-san Tojō"); 189. "Adult Convenience" (大人の都合, "Otona no Tsugō"); 190. "Maybe Reliable" (頼りになるかも, "Tayorininaru Kamo"); 191. "My Acquaintance" (僕の知り合い, "Boku no Shiriai"); 192. "Last Hope" (最後の希望, "Saigo no Kibō")
21	October 16, 2020	978-4-09-850265-3
193. "Toshiya's Teachings" (寿也の指導法, "Toshiya no Shidō-hō"); 194. "The Test Panda" (腕試しパンダ, "Udedameshi Panda); 195. "The Panda's Identity" (パンダの正体, "Panda no Shotai"); 196. "Fuurin Vs. Pro" (風林Vs.プロ, "Fūrin Basasu Puro"); 197. "Aptitude Test" (実力テスト, "Jitsuryoku Tesuto"); 198. "The First Trigger" (最初の起爆剤, "Saisho no Kibaku-zai"); 199. "Towards Spring" (春に向かって, "Haru ni Mukatte"); 200. "A Dry Mushroom" (干されキノコ, "Hosare Kinoko"); 201. "Man-on-Man Baseball" (野球タイマン, "Yakyū Taiman"); 202. "Bearer of the Flower" (花形を背負う者, "Hanagata o Seou Mono")
22	February 18, 2021	978-4-09-850386-5
23	June 17, 2021	978-4-09-850535-7
24	November 18, 2021	978-4-09-850730-6
25	January 18, 2023	978-4-09-851553-0
26	June 16, 2023	978-4-09-852120-3
27	December 18, 2023	978-4-09-853047-2
28	May 17, 2024	978-4-09-853293-3
29	October 18, 2024	978-4-09-853637-5
30	March 18, 2025	978-4-09-854018-1
31	October 17, 2025	978-4-09-854275-8
32	April 17, 2026	978-4-09-854538-4

== Chapters not yet in tankōbon format ==
- 203. ? (立ち込める暗雲, "Tachikomeru An'un")
- 204. ? (江頭の計画, "Egashira no Keikaku")
- 205. ? (練習場を探せ, "Renshū-jō o Sagase")
- 206. ? (強豪中学の現在, "Kyōgō Chūgaku no Genzai")
- 207. ? (合同チーム？, "Gōdō Chīmu?")
- 208. ? (一緒にやろう！, "Issho ni Yarō!")
- 209. ? (行き違う心, "Ikichigau Kokoro")
- 210. ? (交渉の切り札, "Kōshō no Kirifuda")
- 211. ? (合併初日！, "Gappei Shonichi!")
- 212. ? (重圧と緊張と, "Jūatsu to Kinchō to")
- 213. ? (少女闘争, "Shōjo Tōsō")
- 214. ? (秘密の特訓, "Himitsu no Tokkun")
- 215. ? (河川敷の事件, "Kasen-shiki no Jiken")
- 216. ? (もやもや睦子, "Moyamoya Mutsuko")
- 217. ? (本当の気持ち, "Hontō no Kimochi")
- 218. ? (秘められし…？, "Himerare shi...?")
