= Mitsuda =

Mitsuda (written: 光田) is a Japanese surname. Notable people with the surname include:

- Ken Mitsuda (1902–1997), Japanese actor
- Kensuke Mitsuda (1876–1964), Japanese leprologist
- Takuya Mitsuda (born 1965), Japanese manga artist
- Yasunori Mitsuda (born 1972), Japanese composer
