= Buyuden =

Japanese manga series

- First tankōbon volume cover
- Genre: Sports (boxing)
- Manga
- Written by: Takuya Mitsuda
- Published by: Shogakukan
- Imprint: Shōnen Sunday Comics
- Magazine: Weekly Shōnen Sunday
- Original run: March 16, 2011 – January 29, 2014
- Volumes: 13
- icon

Buyuden (Note: The title of the work is rendered in Latin script in its original language, with its Japanese spelling, (武勇伝; 'Heroic Tale'), appearing on the covers of the compilation volumes.) is a Japanese sports manga series written and illustrated by Takuya Mitsuda. It was serialized in Shogakukan's Weekly Shōnen Sunday, from March 2011 to January 2014. Its chapters were collected in thirteen tankōbon volumes.

== Plot ==
Isamu Take is an elitist 6th grader who looks down at his peers because he is the best at everything he does at school, from looks and smarts, to his luck with girls and his abilities as an athlete. He considers himself to be in the top percent of his age group and is incredibly bored with interacting with the so-called normal people. A new student, Moka Kaname, transfers into his school and as she is fairly pretty, Isamu asks her out.

Moka mishears what he says and thinks he wants to challenge her, as she grew up boxing. In fact, Moka is an amazing fighter and can even take down 5 middle school boys at once. Although Isamu cannot stand her violent personality and she cannot stand him for having so much pride, they start to grow attracted to each other. But then Isamu finds out that not only is Moka more athletic than him from all her years of boxing, she's also much smarter than him.

== Characters ==
Isamu Take (武 勇, Take Isamu)
An arrogant boy that sees himself above anyone and is the top student in his elementary school. After getting saved and humiliated in front of Moka Kaname, a boxer girl that he confessed to, he gets into some incidents that makes him really fall in love with Moka and start boxing to spend more time with her.
Moka Kaname (要 萌花, Kaname Moka)
A boxer girl that recently transferred from Kansai. When Isamu confessed to her, she misunderstood him and thought he wanted to have a boxing match with her. After saving Isamu from getting picked on, and a few other incidents, she accepts him as her friend to box with.
Hyoma Hoshi (星 明奈, Hoshi Hyōma)
A sixth grader who goes to the same school as Isamu and Moka. He is the son of a boxing coach who runs Star Gym, and his older sister is a professional female boxer. He doesn't have much confidence in himself because of a boxing loss when he was younger, and he feels that he is no good at boxing compared to his sister.

== Manga ==
Written and illustrated by Takuya Mitsuda, Buyuden was serialized in Shogakukan's Weekly Shōnen Sunday from March 16, 2011, to January 29, 2014. The series was collected into thirteen tankōbon volumes released from July 15, 2011, to June 30, 2014.

=== Volumes ===
No.	Release date	ISBN
1	July 15, 2011	978-4-09-123178-9
2	December 16, 2011	978-4-09-123369-1
3	January 18, 2012	978-4-09-123517-6
4	April 18, 2012	978-4-09-123646-3
5	January 20, 2014	978-4-09-123792-7
6	January 20, 2014	978-4-09-123889-4
7	February 10, 2014	978-4-09-124185-6
8	February 10, 2014	978-4-09-124303-4
9	February 10, 2014	978-4-09-124362-1
10	March 17, 2014	978-4-09-124455-0
11	April 28, 2014	978-4-09-124521-2
12	May 21, 2014	978-4-09-124558-8
13	June 30, 2014	978-4-09-124585-4
