= Kōji Ochiai =

Japanese actor

- 落合 弘治
- Occupations: Actor; voice actor
- Years active: 1990–present

Kōji Ochiai (落合 弘治, Ochiai Kōji) is a Japanese actor and voice actor.

== Filmography ==
=== Television animation ===
- Major (2004), Joe Gibson
- Yu-Gi-Oh! GX (2004), Kabukid
- Viewtiful Joe (2004), Whity
- One Piece (2004), Dr. Honner
- Eyeshield 21 (2005), Natsuhiko Taki
- Gallery Fake (2005), Simon
- Blue Dragon (2007), Minotaur
- Stitch! (2008), Reuben
- Zettai Karen Children (2008), Shirō Magi
- Yu-Gi-Oh! 5D's (2008), Tetsu Trudge
- Naruto: Shippuden (2011), Iggy
- Jormungand (2012), C.K. Kloskin
- Kingdom (2013), Amon
- Chaika - The Coffin Princess (2014), Marat
- Yuri on Ice (2016), Celestino Chaldini
- Carole & Tuesday (2019), Benito
- Ron Kamonohashi's Forbidden Deductions 2nd Season (2024), Bill Clark

=== Original net animation (ONA) ===
- Kotaro Lives Alone (2022), Ohba

=== Original video animation (OVA) ===
- Lupin III: Return of the Magician (2002), a sommelier
- Mobile Suit Gundam: The Origin (2017), the mayor of Granada

=== Theatrical animation ===
- Major: The ball of Friendship (2008), Joe Gibson

=== Tokusatsu ===
- Seijuu Sentai Gingaman (1998), Black Knight BullBlack
- Kamen Rider Den-O (2007), Tortoise Imagin (ep. 21 - 22), Panda Rabbit Imagin (ep. 39)

=== Video games ===
- Sonic Adventure 2 (2001), GUN soldiers
- Glass Rose (2003), Jungo Ogasawara
- Yu-Gi-Oh! series (2009–), Tetsu Ushio
- Metal Gear Solid: Peace Walker (2010), a Soldier
- Ni no Kuni: Wrath of the White Witch (2011), Apus
- Time Travelers (2012), Morito Takaido
- Final Fantasy XV (2016), Petra Fortis
- Resident Evil 7: Biohazard (2017), Peter Walken
- Kingdom Hearts III (2019), Aliens
- Yakuza: Like A Dragon (2020), Toshio Arakawa
- Famicom Detective Club: The Girl Who Stands Behind (2021 Remake) (2021), Inspector Maruyama

=== Dubbing ===
==== Live-action ====
- 1%, President Knuck (Matt Nable)
- 10,000 BC, Nakudu (Joel Virgel)
- 42, Leo Durocher (Christopher Meloni)
- The Adventures of Elmo in Grouchland, Elmo
- The Affair of the Necklace, Rétaux de Villette (Simon Baker)
- Alice Through the Looking Glass, Delivery Frog
- Anchorman: The Legend of Ron Burgundy, Brian Fantana (Paul Rudd)
- Annapolis, Jake Huard (James Franco)
- Annika, DS Michael McAndrews (Jamie Sives)
- Army of the Dead, Martin (Garret Dillahunt)
- Back to the Future Part II (2018 BS Japan edition), Douglas J. Needles (Flea)
- Bad Lieutenant: Port of Call New Orleans, Stevie Pruit (Val Kilmer)
- Baggage Claim, Langston Jefferson Battle III (Taye Diggs)
- Battleship, Cal Zapata (Hamish Linklater)
- The Big Bang Theory, Barry Kripke (John Ross Bowie)
- Black Mass, John Connolly (Joel Edgerton)
- Boardwalk Empire, Al Capone (Stephen Graham)
- Braqueurs, Yanis Zeri (Sami Bouajila)
- Bring It On: All or Nothing, Jesse (Gus Carr)
- Brooklyn's Finest, Detective Clarence "Tango" Butler (Don Cheadle)
- Bullitt (2015 Wowow edition), Lt. Frank Bullitt (Steve McQueen)
- The Child in Time, Charles (Stephen Campbell Moore)
- Constantine, Papa Midnite (Djimon Hounsou)
- Cuban Fury, Drew (Chris O'Dowd)
- Curse of Chucky, Ian (Brennan Elliott)
- Deep Impact, Mark Simon (Blair Underwood)
- Delivery Man, Brett (Chris Pratt)
- The Dictator, Aladeen / Efawadh (Sacha Baron Cohen)
- A Dog's Purpose, Carlos Ruiz (John Ortiz)
- Drive Hard, Peter Roberts (Thomas Jane)
- The Fabelmans, Bennie Loewy (Seth Rogen)
- Firewall (2009 TV Asahi edition), Liam (Nikolaj Coster-Waldau)
- First Sunday, Ricky (Katt Williams)
- G.I. Joe: The Rise of Cobra, Wallace Weems / Ripcord (Marlon Wayans)
- Glitter, Julian "Dice" Black (Max Beesley)
- Gone, Sgt. Powers (Daniel Sunjata)
- Gossip Girl, Carter Baizen (Sebastian Stan)
- Great Expectations, Finnegan "Finn" Bell (Ethan Hawke)
- Half Past Dead, Twitch (Kurupt)
- Harold and the Purple Crayon, Gary Natwick (Jemaine Clement)
- He's Just Not That Into You, Conor Barry (Kevin Connolly)
- Home Alone: The Holiday Heist, Hughes (Eddie Steeples)
- The Huntsman: Winter's War, Gryff (Rob Brydon)
- Identity (2007 TV Tokyo edition), Lou Isiana (William Lee Scott)
- In Her Shoes, Simon Stein (Mark Feuerstein)
- Infinitely Polar Bear, Cam Stuart (Mark Ruffalo)
- Interview with the Vampire (2025 BS10 Star Channel edition), Santiago (Stephen Rea)
- Jurassic World (2025 The Cinema edition), Simon Masrani (Irrfan Khan)
- Kangaroo Jack, Charlie Carbone (Jerry O'Connell)
- Lethal Weapon 2 (1993 TV Asahi edition), Arjen Rudd (Joss Ackland)
- The Lost Daughter, Professor Hardy (Peter Sarsgaard)
- Mad Max: Fury Road, The Ace (Jon Iles)
- Mad Max: Fury Road (2019 THE CINEMA edition), Corpus Colossus (Quentin Kenihan)
- The Magnificent Seven, Bartholomew Bogue (Peter Sarsgaard)
- Mary Poppins Returns, Parrot Umbrella (Edward Hibbert)
- Mercenary for Justice, Samuel (Michael K. Williams)
- A Million Ways to Die in the West, Edward (Giovanni Ribisi)
- Nacho Libre, Steven / Esqueleto (Héctor Jiménez)
- Nebraska, David Grant (Will Forte)
- Not Safe for Work, Roger Crawford (Tom Gallop)
- Old Dogs, Craig White (Seth Green)
- Old School, Bernard "Beanie" Campbell (Vince Vaughn)
- The Onion Movie, White Trash Dude (Steven Kozlowski)
- A Perfect Getaway, Cliff (Steve Zahn)
- Pirates of the Caribbean: On Stranger Tides, Salaman (Paul Bazely)
- Platoon (1998 DVD edition), Bunny (Kevin Dillon)
- Police, Jailbird and Thief (Wesley Ruggles)
- Project ALF, Captain Dr. Rick Mullican (William O'Leary)
- Prometheus, Millburn (Rafe Spall)
- Prometheus (2017 The Cinema edition), Fifield (Sean Harris)
- Rise of the Planet of the Apes, Steven Jacobs (David Oyelowo)
- The Sandlot: Heading Home, Benny Rodriguez (Danny Nucci)
- A Series of Unfortunate Events, Uncle Monty (Aasif Mandvi)
- Some Like It Hot (2012 Wowow edition), Joe (Tony Curtis)
- Species III, Dean (Robin Dunne)
- Strays, Finn (Jimmy Tatro)
- Ted, Donny (Giovanni Ribisi)
- Ted 2, Donny (Giovanni Ribisi)
- Thanksgiving, Sheriff Eric Newlon (Patrick Dempsey)
- The Tramp (2014 Star Channel edition), Edna's Fiancé / Second Thief (Lloyd Bacon)
- Transformers: Revenge of the Fallen, Wheelie (Tom Kenny)
- Transformers: Dark of the Moon, Wheelie (Tom Kenny)
- Transformers: The Last Knight, Wheelie (Tom Kenny)
- Tully, Drew Moreau (Ron Livingston)
- Wrath of the Titans, Agenor (Toby Kebbell)
- XXX: State of the Union, Darius Stone (Ice Cube)
- You, Me and Dupree, Randolph "Randy" Dupree (Owen Wilson)
- You Stupid Man, Owen (David Krumholtz)

==== Animation ====
- The Angry Birds Movie, Ross and Cyrus
- Cars 2, Miles Axelrod
- Chip 'n Dale: Rescue Rangers, Sweet Pete
- The Good Dinosaur, Thunderclap
- Inside Out, Fear
- Inside Out 2, Fear
- The Lego Movie 2: The Second Part, Banarnar, Balthazar
- Luca, Uncle Ugo
- Moominvalley, Sniff
- Regular Show, Mordecai
- Storks, Henry Gardner
- Teenage Mutant Ninja Turtles: Mutant Mayhem, Bebop
- The Wild Thornberrys Movie, Boko
- Wreck-It Ralph, Mayor Gene
- Ralph Breaks the Internet, Mayor Gene
