= Major 2nd =

Japanese manga series

- First tankōbon volume cover, featuring Daigo Shigeno
- Genre: Sports
- Manga
- Written by: Takuya Mitsuda
- Published by: Shogakukan
- Imprint: Shōnen Sunday Comics
- Magazine: Weekly Shōnen Sunday
- Original run: March 11, 2015 – present
- Volumes: 32
- Anime television series
- Directed by: Ayumu Watanabe
- Written by: Michihiro Tsuchiya; Kenji Konuta; Mitsuyo Suenaga; Kenichi Yamashita; Akiko Inoue
- Music by: Kōtarō Nakagawa
- Studio: OLM Team Kojima
- Licensed by: Crunchyroll
- Original network: NHK Educational TV
- Original run: April 7, 2018 – November 7, 2020
- Episodes: 50
- Preceded by
- Major (1994–2010)
- icon

Major 2nd (stylized in all caps) is a Japanese sports manga series written and illustrated by Takuya Mitsuda. It is a sequel to the original manga series Major. It has been serialized in Shogakukan's Weekly Shōnen Sunday since March 2015. An anime television series adaptation aired on NHK Educational TV from April to September 2018. A second season aired from April to November 2020.

== Characters ==
=== Main characters ===
Daigo Shigeno (茂野 大吾, Shigeno Daigo)
Position: Catcher
Voiced by: Natsumi Fujiwara
The eldest son of Goro Shigeno and captain of Fūrin Middle School's baseball club.
Hikaru Satō (佐藤 光, Satō Hikaru)
Position: Pitcher, Catcher
Voiced by: Kōtarō Nishiyama
Toshiya's son and Daigo's teammate and rival.
Mutsuko Sakura (佐倉 睦子, Sakura Mutsuko)
Position: Pitcher, Outfielder
Voiced by: Kana Hanazawa
Daigo's classmate and vice-captain of Fūrin Middle School's baseball club.

=== Mifune Dolphins ===
Hayato Urabe (卜部 隼人, Urabe Hayato)
Position: Pitcher
Voiced by: Taichi Ichikawa
Daigo's teammate and Mifune's main and finest pitcher.
Andy Suzuki (鈴木 アンディ, Suzuki Andi)
Position: Catcher
Voiced by: Shintaro Ohata
Daigo's teammate and Mifune's main and finest catcher.

=== Ōbi Middle School ===
Michiru Mayumura (眉村 道塁, Mayumura Michiru)
Position: Pitcher
Voiced by: Yui Horie
Ken's daughter and Wataru's twin sister. She is a southpaw pitcher.
Wataru Mayumura (眉村 道塁, Mayumura Wataru)
Position: Catcher
Voiced by: Jun Fukushima
Ken's son and Michiru's twin brother. He is a catcher.
Sanae Gōda (郷田 早苗, Gōda Sanae)

=== Family Members ===
Izumi Shigeno (茂野 いずみ, Shigeno Izumi)
Voiced by: Natsumi Takamori
Gōrō's daughter and Daigo's older sister.

=== Fūrin Middle School ===
Akira Nishina (仁科 明, Nishina Akira)
Position: Pitcher, Outfielder
Voiced by: Daiki Yamashita
Tao Sagara (相楽 太鳳, Sagara Tao)
Position: Shortstop
Voiced by: Ayane Sakura
Yayoi Sawa (沢 弥生, Sawa Yayoi)
Position: Second Baseman
Voiced by: Maki Kawase
Anita Kabashima (椛島 アニータ, Kabashima Anita)
Position: Catcher, Outfielder
Voiced by: Rie Murakawa
Chisato Fujī (藤井 千里, Fujī Chisato)
Position: Center Fielder
Voiced by: Sumire Uesaka
Daughter of Fujī, from the original Major series.
Seira Kandori (関鳥 星蘭, Kandori Seira)
Position: Third Baseman
Voiced by: Ayahi Takagaki
Hiromu Tanba (丹波 広夢, Tanba Hiromu)
Position: First Baseman
Voiced by: Tomokazu Sugita
Takumi Chiba (千叶 拓巳, Chiba Takumi)
Voiced by: Yūki Yonai
Chiyo Fujī (藤井 千代, Fujī Chiyo)
Position: Pitcher
Voiced by: Sayumi Watabe

== Media ==
=== Manga ===
Written and illustrated by Takuya Mitsuda, Major 2nd started in Shogakukan's Weekly Shōnen Sunday on March 11, 2015. In November 2018, the series was put on hiatus, and resumed its publication in April 2019. In October 2021, it was announced that the manga would enter an extended hiatus due to Mitsuda's poor physical health; the manga resumed publication on October 26, 2022. Shogakukan has collected its chapters into individual tankōbon volumes. The first volume was released on June 12, 2015. As of April 17, 2026, 32 volumes have been released.

=== Anime ===
In October 2017, an anime television series adaptation of Major 2nd was announced. It aired from April 7 to September 22, 2018, on NHK Educational TV. A second season with the same main cast and staff from the first season premiered on April 4, 2020. Episodes were delayed and rescheduled due to the COVID-19 pandemic. The season finished on November 7, 2020.

Crunchyroll streamed the series with English subtitles.

== Reception ==
By April 2018, the Major 2nd manga had 5.6 million copies in circulation, for the first 13 volumes.
