= Major (manga) =

Japanese manga series

- First tankōbon volume cover, featuring Gorou Honda as a child
- Genre: Coming-of-age; Sports
- Manga
- Written by: Takuya Mitsuda
- Published by: Shogakukan
- Imprint: Shōnen Sunday Comics
- Magazine: Weekly Shōnen Sunday
- Original run: August 3, 1994 – July 7, 2010
- Volumes: 78
- Anime television series
- Directed by: Ken'ichi Kasai (S1–2); Toshinori Fukushima (S3–6)
- Music by: Noriyuki Asakura
- Studio: Studio Hibari (#1–78); SynergySP (#79–154)
- Original network: NHK-E
- English network: PH: HERO, Yey!
- Original run: November 13, 2004 – September 25, 2010
- Episodes: 154 + 3 OVAs
- Anime film

Major: Yūjō no Winning Shot
- Directed by: Takao Kato
- Studio: Xebec
- Released: December 13, 2008
- Runtime: 100 minutes
- Sequel
- Major 2nd (2015–present)
- icon

Major (stylized in all caps) is a Japanese sports manga series written and illustrated by Takuya Mitsuda. It was serialized in Shogakukan's shōnen manga magazine Weekly Shōnen Sunday from August 1994 to July 2010, with its chapters collected in 78 tankōbon volumes. It was followed by a sequel titled Major 2nd, which started in Weekly Shōnen Sunday in March 2015.

It was adapted into a 154-episode anime television series by Studio Hibari and later by SynergySP, titled Major. (Note: Using katakana instead of the manga's English characters) It ran for six seasons on NHK E from November 2004 to September 2010. Two original video animations (OVAs) were released in December 2011 and January 2012.

In 1996, Major received the Shogakukan Manga Award for the shōnen category. By October 2024, the manga series had over 66.66 million copies in circulation.

== Plot ==
The story follows the life of Gorō Honda from childhood through his professional baseball career, focusing on his perseverance through adversity. Gorō's father, Shigeharu Honda, is a professional baseball pitcher who plays for teams in Nippon Professional Baseball (NPB). Gorō deeply admires his father and aspires to follow in his footsteps. His mother, Chiaki Honda, died two years before the story begins. Gorō forms close bonds with his kindergarten teacher, Momoko Hoshino, and his childhood friend, Toshiya Sato, whom he teaches to play baseball. Shigeharu suffers a career-ending arm injury, devastating Gorō. Determined to continue supporting his son, Shigeharu retrains as a slugger and eventually joins the Yokohama Marine Stars. During this time, Momoko grows closer to the family, and Shigeharu proposes to her. In a pivotal game against the Tokyo Giants, Shigeharu hits a home run off a fastball from American pitcher Joe Gibson. However, Gibson later throws a pitch that strikes Shigeharu in the head, leading to his death from internal bleeding the following day.

Three years later, Momoko adopts Gorō. When he reaches fourth grade, he joins the Mifune Dolphins little league team, recruiting friends to prevent its disbandment. Recognizing Gorō's talent, the coach suggests he transfer to the more competitive Yokohama Little team, where Toshiya plays. Gorō hesitates, unwilling to abandon his friends, but after Momoko falls ill, he reaffirms his commitment to those around him. Meanwhile, Gibson invites Gorō to watch the MLB All-Star game in the United States, where he demonstrates his pitching prowess. Inspired, Gorō vows to one day challenge Gibson. Leading the Dolphins to victory over Yokohama Little, Gorō suffers an injury and later moves to Fukuoka with Momoko and her new husband, Hideki Shigeno, without saying goodbye to his teammates. After returning to Mifune, Gorō reunites with his friends at Mifune East Junior High. Initially uninterested in baseball due to a shoulder injury, he eventually rejoins the sport as a left-handed pitcher. He rebuilds the school team with his friend Komori Daisuke and defeats rival Toshiya's team in a regional tournament. Despite tensions over high school choices, Gorō and Toshiya eventually enroll together at Kaido High School, a prestigious baseball powerhouse. After rigorous training, Gorō leads the junior varsity team to victory against the varsity squad before leaving Kaido to seek greater challenges.

Gorō returns home, where his mother insists he take responsibility for his decision. After facing opposition from Kaido's assistant coach, he enrolls at Seishuu High School, a former girls' school without a baseball team. He forms a team from scratch and leads them to the summer tournament quarterfinals against Kaido. Despite a valiant effort, Seishuu loses, and Gorō collapses from exhaustion. Gorō's performance attracts professional scouts, but upon learning Gibson remains active in MLB, he leaves for the United States. He begins in Triple-A, where he clashes with Joe Gibson Jr., who blames Gorō for past family tragedies. After striking out Gibson Jr., Gorō helps his team win the Triple-A playoffs. He later represents Japan in the Baseball World Cup, facing Gibson Jr. in the finals. Despite a strong performance, Gorō loses, briefly losing his passion for baseball before returning to the sport with renewed determination.

Gorō debuts in MLB with the Hornets, initially excelling before developing the yips. After recovering with psychological assistance, he struggles with motivation until Gibson's retirement reignites his drive. Years later, Gorō faces Gibson Jr. in the World Series, while his wife, Shimizu, gives birth to their child. After a 14-year career, Gorō retires due to a shoulder injury but later returns to Japan as a hitter and fielder for the Blue Oceans, inspiring his children just as his father once inspired him.

== Characters ==
=== Main ===
Gorō Honda (本田 吾郎, Honda Gorō) / Gorō Shigeno (茂野 吾郎, Shigeno Gorō)
Voiced by: Motoko Kumai (child), Showtaro Morikubo (teen/adult)
Gorō demonstrates exceptional baseball talent from an early age, developing his passion through his father, a professional player. After his mother's death when he is three, baseball becomes his primary connection to his remaining parent. At age six, his father dies during a game after being struck by a pitch from American player Joe Gibson, which motivates Gorō's determination to reach Major League Baseball. Following this, he is adopted by Momoko Hoshino, his former kindergarten teacher and his father's romantic partner. When Momoko later marries, Gorō takes the surname Shigeno. His natural athleticism and dedication attract teammates who admire his skills.
Shigeharu Honda (本田 茂治, Honda Shigeharu)
Voiced by: Takehito Koyasu
Shigeharu is a pitcher for the Marine Stars and raises his son, Gorō, as a widower. When an elbow injury jeopardizes his pitching career, teammate Shigeno convinces him to transition to hitting. He develops romantic feelings for Gorō's kindergarten teacher and nearly marries her. He died after being struck by a pitch from American Major League Baseball (MLB) pitcher Joe Gibson. In his youth, he played for Yokohama Little League and later attended Koshien High School alongside Shigeno.
Chiaki Honda (本田 千秋, Honda Chiaki)
Voiced by: Noriko Hidaka
Chiaki Honda was Shigeharu Honda's wife and Gorō's mother. She died prior to the events of the series.
Momoko Hoshino (星野 桃子, Hoshino Momoko) / Momoko Shigeno (茂野 桃子, Shigeno Momoko)
Voiced by: Junko Noda
Momoko was Gorō's nursery school teacher when he was younger. After Gorō left nursery school, she dated his dad Shigeharu and was engaged to him at the time of his death. She adopted Gorō and raises him as a single parent until she marries Hideki Shigeno several years later. Her name changes to Momoko Shigeno. She then has children of her own, a boy named Shingo and a girl named Chiharu.
Hideki Shigeno (茂野 英毅, Shigeno Hideki)
Voiced by: Shunsuke Sakuya
Hideki is an ace pitcher for the Yokohama Marine Stars and has shared a lifelong friendship with Shigeharu Honda since their high school years. When Shigeharu sustains an arm injury, Shigeno recommends his transition to batting. After Shigeharu's death, Shigeno reconnects with Momoko and Gorō, mentoring the young player in baseball. He marries Momoko three years later, adopting Gorō and fathering two additional children, Shingo and Chiharu. Professionally, Shigeno plays for both the Marine Stars and Fukuoka Eagles before returning to Yokohama in 2000. Following performance struggles and a resurgent final season, he retires with his number (#17) retired by the team. He later works as a sports commentator before becoming head coach and pitching instructor for Japan's national team during the 2005 Baseball World Cup.
Toshiya Sato (佐藤寿也, Satō Toshiya)
Voiced by: Fuyuka Oura (child), Masakazu Morita (teen/adult)
Toshiya shifts from academics to baseball after observing Gorō's practice, developing into an accomplished catcher for Yokohama Little League. Their friendship becomes a rivalry when Gorō returns years later. After his family abandons him, Toshiya lives with his grandparents, vowing to turn professional. He attends Kaido High School but initially misjudges Gorō's intentions regarding scout pressure. Following a loss to Gorō's team, they reconcile and briefly become Kaido teammates. As Kaido's cleanup hitter, Toshiya excels in the Koshien Tournament before joining the Tokyo Warriors as Rookie of the Year. During the Baseball World Cup, he successfully transitions back to catcher with Gorō's support.
Kaoru Shimizu (清水薫, Shimizu Kaoru)
Voiced by: Yuko Sasamoto
Kaoru Shimizu meets Gorō in elementary school and joins the Mifune Dolphins Little League after seeing his baseball dedication. As Gorō's first recruit, she catches in the finals when Daisuke is injured, developing romantic feelings for him. In junior high, she switches to softball, captaining Mifune East's team while retaining mixed feelings about baseball. Though initially planning to attend Gorō's high school, she chooses Seishu High instead when learning it lacks softball, following Gorō's advice to pursue her passion. At Seishu, she convinces her brother Taiga to join baseball. After high school, she attends Kyowa University where Gorō confesses his feelings, beginning their relationship. Her softball passion mirrors Gorō's baseball devotion, and they eventually marry, having two children.
Joe Gibson (ジョー・ギブソン)
Voiced by: Kōji Ochiai
Joe Gibson is the pitcher whose fatal pitch killed Gorō's father. He carries this guilt throughout his career. He maintains elite performance in Major League Baseball to honor Shigeharu Honda's legacy as a worthy opponent. The incident fractures his family, particularly his relationship with son Joe Gibson Jr., who resents both Gibson and Honda for their family's breakdown. After his wife and daughter die, Gibson continues pitching past age 40 in America, achieving over 300 career wins. When Gorō turns professional, Gibson anticipates their eventual matchup. During the Baseball World Cup, he pitches as Team USA's ace despite suffering from angina pectoris, risking his life as atonement to Gorō and the late Honda. After successful surgery, he reflects: "I too once had a great rival, though he is now dead because of me."

=== Supporting ===
Daisuke Komori (小森 大介, Komori Daisuke)
Voiced by: Rie Kugimiya (child), Koki Miyata (teen/adult)
Daisuke forms a battery with Gorō as his catcher for the Mifune Dolphins Little League team, alongside teammates Sawamura and Shimizu. After initially facing bullying from Sawamura, he bonds with Gorō when the latter defends him. Their partnership continues when Gorō returns to Mifune East Middle School, but ends after Mayumura single-handedly defeats their team against Kaido's affiliate school. When Gorō attends Seishuu High, Daisuke becomes his rival, ultimately losing to him. After high school, Daisuke plays as a university pinch hitter before leaving professional baseball. He later returns to coach the Mifune Dolphins Little League team where his baseball journey began.
Taiga Shimizu (清水 大河, Shimizu Taiga)
Voiced by: Romi Park
Kaoru's younger brother initially appears observing his sister's baseball activities. He later joins the Seishuu High School baseball team as a shortstop during their third year of establishment. Demonstrating exceptional fielding skills and speed, he becomes instrumental in the team's challenge against Kaido High School. When pitcher Gorō suffers an injury during a practice game against Kaido, he temporarily assumes pitching duties.
Originally cynical about their chances, his perspective changes after witnessing Gorō's determined performances while injured. He eventually becomes team captain, leading Seishuu's renewed challenge against Kaido with the declared goal of reaching the Koshien tournament. Initially lacking confidence, he attempts to master the gyroball to inspire teammates before Gorō advises him to develop his own team identity rather than emulate others. As the team's leadoff batter and starting shortstop, he bats left-handed.
Ryota Sawamura (沢村 涼太, Sawamura Ryōta)
Voiced by: Kahoru Sasajima
Initially, Ryota is a bully in elementary school, pushing Daisuke. Gorō and Shimizu stand up to him, and he eventually backs down after Gorō hits him for trying to throw his baseball glove into the river. He soon realizes that he does not have any real friends and asks Gorō if he can play baseball with him, Shimizu and Daisuke. He started off playing soccer but changes to baseball so he could play in Little League with Gorō and the others. In junior high, he went back to soccer and was the captain of the team. In season 6, we learn that he injured his knee and could not continue playing. He remains friends with Daisuke, Shimizu, and Gorō.
Yoshitaka Yamane (山根 義隆, Yamane Yoshitaka)
Voiced by: Hideki Ogihara
Introduced in the Junior High story arc, Yoshitaka Yamane is on the Mifune Junior High School team but uses it to cut class with some other friends that follow him. He and his friends beat up Daisuke after he tells them that they have to quit if they are not going to contribute to the team and frightened the remaining players into quitting, too. When Gorō returns and confronts him, Yamane reveals that he hates baseball because he cannot play it anymore. He was injured the year before and cannot throw the ball with his right arm. Gorō, who suffered a similar injury, teaches Yamane to throw left-handed, and he rejoins the team, playing first base. He goes on to Mifune High School with Daisuke, where he became the pitcher.
Joe Gibson Jr. (ジョー・ギブソンJr., Jō Gibuson Junia)
Voiced by: Daisuke Namikawa
Joe Gibson Jr., son of pitcher Joe Gibson, is Gorō's contemporary. After his parents' divorce—caused by his mother's inability to adapt to Japan while his father remained to atone for killing Honda—Junior stayed with his father in Japan. When his mother and sister died in a U.S. traffic accident, he grew bitter toward both his father and the late Honda. This resentment fueled his baseball career, where he developed into an exceptional switch-hitter determined to surpass his father. He played for the AAA Oklahoma Falcons and MLB's Texas Raiders before joining Team USA in the Baseball World Cup. As a third baseman, he secured Team USA's championship victory with a walk-off home run against Gorō's 103 mph fastball.
Ken Mayumura (眉村 健, Mayumura Ken)
Voiced by: Makoto Yasumura
Mayumura is a disciplined pitcher with a calm yet competitive demeanor. His pre-game music ritual, mistaken for focus, actually manages anxiety. Featuring a fastball matching Gorō's speed and Shigeno's gyroball mastery, he aims to dominate NPB before moving to MLB. He debuts with the Yokohama Blue Oceans, later becoming the Texas Raiders' ace and forming a strong battery with catcher Jeff Keene.

== Media ==
=== Manga ===
Written and illustrated by Takuya Mitsuda, Major was serialized in Shogakukan's shōnen manga anthology Weekly Shōnen Sunday from August 3, 1994, to July 7, 2010. Shogakukan collected its 747 individual chapters in 78 tankōbon volumes, released from January 13, 1995, to December 17, 2010.

A sequel to the series, Major 2nd, started in Weekly Shōnen Sunday on March 11, 2015.

=== Anime ===
Major has been adapted into an anime television series by Studio Hibari and later by SynergySP, titled Major (メジャー, Mejā). The series was broadcast on NHK E for 154 episodes divided in six seasons from November 13, 2004, to September 25, 2010. An animated film telling the story between the first and second seasons of the anime was released on December 13, 2008. Two OVAs were released on December 16, 2011, and January 18, 2012. The OVAs adapted the World Series chapter, which was skipped in the TV series.

=== Video games ===
Takara Tomy published two video games in 2008; Major DS: Dream Baseball (メジャーDS ドリームベースボール), released for the Nintendo DS on July 31; and Major Wii: Perfect Closer (MAJORDREAM メジャーWii パーフェクトクローザー) on December 11.

The manga's characters also appeared on the crossovers Sunday × Magazine: Nettō!! Dream Nine and Sunday & Magazine: White Comic, both released for the Nintendo DS in 2009.

== Reception and legacy ==
By November 2021, the Major manga had over 55 million copies in circulation. By October 2024, the manga series had over 66.66 million copies in circulation, making it one of the best-selling manga series.

Major won the 41st Shogakukan Manga Award in the shōnen category in 1996. A 2020 poll conducted by Goo with 14,846 participants ranked Major as the sixth best manga series ever published in Weekly Shōnen Sunday. On TV Asahi's Manga Sōsenkyo 2021 poll, in which 150.000 people voted for their top 100 manga series, Major ranked 83rd.

In 2006, the anime series ranked 46th in an online poll conducted by TV Asahi on Japan's favorite animated TV series. A Celebrity List of the same poll placed the anime series at the 70th spot. In 2005, sporting goods manufacturer Mizuno entered into a one-year agreement with Shogakukan to have their company logo appear in the baseball equipment used by Goro Shigeno and other characters in the manga series. Under the agreement, Mizuno would also use the Goro Shigeno character in other promotional events. An article from The Boston Globe credits the manga series for helping increase the popularity of the gyroball pitch.

Following Japan's victory against the United States in the 2023 World Baseball Classic final, Matsuda created a commemorative illustration featuring Goro alongside Shohei Ohtani that was published in Sports Nippon.
