= Takuya Mitsuda =

Japanese manga artist

- Born: June 17, 1965 (age 61); Fukuyama City, Japan
- Other name: 満田拓也
- Occupation: Manga artist
- Years active: 1989–present
- Employer: Shogakukan
- Notable work: Major
- Awards: Shogakukan Newcomers Award (1982), Shogakukan Manga Award (1996)

Takuya Mitsuda (満田拓也, Mitsuda Takuya; born June 17, 1965) is a Japanese manga artist from Fukuyama City, Hiroshima Prefecture. He has published his works primarily in Shogakukan's manga magazine, Weekly Shōnen Sunday.

He is best known for his long-running baseball manga Major for which he won the Shogakukan Manga Award in 1996 in the shōnen category.

Mitsuda debuted in 1982, winning the Shogakukan Newcomers Award for "Banyū".

== Works ==
Title	Japanese title	Date	Volumes	Magazine
Kenta Yarimasu!	健太やります!	April 10, 1989 – June 2, 1994	26	Weekly Shōnen Sunday
Major	メジャー	August 3, 1994 – July 21, 2010	78	Weekly Shōnen Sunday
Buyuden	武勇伝	March 30, 2011 – February 5, 2014	13	Weekly Shōnen Sunday
Major 2nd	メジャー セカンド	March 15, 2015 – present	32	Weekly Shōnen Sunday

=== Other works ===
- Manga NTT Kabu wa Taika Kesuru! (漫画NTT株は大化けする!)
- Manga de Oboeru Baiku (まんがで覚えるバイク) (1987)
