= Groove on Fight =

1997 video game

- Developer: Atlus
- Publisher: Atlus
- Programmers: Masahide Yamasaki; Toshiya Morishima
- Artist: Range Murata
- Composer: Toshikazu Tanaka
- Series: Power Instinct
- Platforms: Arcade, Sega Saturn
- Release: Arcade: JP: May 1997; Saturn: JP: May 16, 1997
- Genre: Fighting
- Modes: Single-player, multiplayer
- Arcade system: ST-V

Groove on Fight: Gōketsuji Ichizoku 3 (Note: Japanese: グルーヴオンファイト 豪血寺一族３, Hepburn: Gurūvu on Faito Gouketsuji Ichizoku 3) is a 1997 fighting game developed by Atlus. It is the fourth in the Power Instinct series. The game has artwork and designs by famed artist Range Murata. The game has a darker tone and is set in the future with only two characters from the prior games returning. Though the art and visual style was praised, critics were more indifferent about the overall gameplay, giving it average scores.

== Gameplay ==
Arcade version screenshot

Oume and Otane are the only returning characters from the previous games.

A tag system is introduced, taken from Gogetsuji Gaiden: Saikyou Densetsu. Each match has four characters. This gameplay mechanic is similar to X-Men vs Street Fighter, where the player picks two characters at a time and changes them at will. The player can also throw any other character, including their partner.

The character Bristol can summon demons which are the same as the ones that have appeared in the Shin Megami Tensei series.

After beating the game, a gallery mode can be unlocked showing concept art, including some for characters that did not make the final version.

The game features up to four players by using the Sega Multi-tap.

== Plot ==
The game takes place 20 years after the last game in the series, and is set in the year 2015.

== Development and release ==
Groove on Fight is the fourth game in the Power Instinct series. Artist Range Murata worked on the game and prior entries in the series. He also worked on the Saturn title Wachenröder.

The game supports the 1MB or 4MB RAM expansion cart. The game was sold with and without the 1MB cart.

The arcade version of the game appeared at the JAMMA 96 trade show at the Atlus booth alongside a 3D fighter known as Ultimate Domain. The arcade version used the Sega ST-V arcade board.

The game was released for the Sega Saturn on May 16, 1997, exclusively in Japan. The Saturn version has issues with low frame rate and long loading times.

== Reception ==
Reception

Review scores
Publication	Score
GameFan	71.7 /100
GameSpot	6.3/10
Sega Saturn Magazine (JP)	6.33 /10
Super GamePower	3 /5
Joypad	79%
Consoles +	85 /100
Gamers	81 /100
J-Pop	3 /5
Saturn Power	80%

Brazilian magazine Super GamePower gave it 3.0 out of 5.

GameSpot gave it 6.3 out of 10. Viz Media's online magazine J-Pop gave it 3/5.

Three reviewers for GameFan gave the game scores of 70, 80, 65. One reviewer was highly critical of the game, saying that the 3MB of RAM the extra memory cart brought should have resulted in a better game, and noted the constant loading times, and animations as the same quality as Street Fighter II. Another reviewer praised the art and cast of characters, but said that the pace of the game was rather slow and the gameplay was "not bad". The last reviewer was more positive about the game, while noting that the animation quality was lacking, and the Super Moves system was easy to abuse. Despite this however, they commended the character designs, calling them "stunningly beautiful" and specifically mentioning Solis' outfit and praised the gameplay, referring to it as "wacky".

Three reviewers for the Japanese Sega Saturn Magazine reviewed the game, and gave it average marks. In an import review for the English Saturn Power magazine, they praised the game saying "Groove on Fight dares to be different and looks and plays well enough to get away with it".

In 2003, Edge magazine's Retro special issue called the game derivative, and criticized the loading times and low frame rate. Despite this, they said it was a decent alternative to Capcom fighting games. In 2006, Play magazine contributing editor Eric Patterson listed the game's cover art, along with River City Ransom, as his favorite game covers of all time.
