= Hiroki Miura =

Japanese actor (born 1999)

- 三浦 宏規
- Born: March 24, 1999 (age 27); Mie, Japan
- Occupation: Actor
- Years active: 2014–present
- Agent: Will-B International Inc.
- Height: 178 cm (5 ft 10 in)
- Website: https://www.miurahiroki.com/

Hiroki Miura (三浦宏規, Miura Hiroki, born March 24, 1999) is a Japanese stage actor associated with Will-B International Inc..

== Personal life ==
Miura was born in the Mie Prefecture on March 24, 1999. He is an only child. When Miura was 5 years old, he started to learn classical ballet after watching Tetsuya Kumakawa's video. Miura has won several prizes in ballet competitions.

Miura was active in the Tōkai region until he was 14 years old. After graduating from junior high school, he went to senior high school in Tokyo and became an actor.

== Career ==
In 2015, Miura played the role of Monkey D. Luffy at Tokyo One Piece Tower, which was the beginning of stepping into the 2.5-dimensional stage. In the same year, he entered the musical work with Koisuru Broadway♪ vol.4.

In 2016, Miura gained attention as Keigo Atobe in the TENIMYU: The Prince of Tennis Musical 3rd Season Series .

On October 24, 2017, Miura's official fan club "White & Black" was established.

In November 2017, Miura began to play the role of Higekiri in the Touken Ranbu musical, and his popularity has risen. In addition to participating in the "Japan Unisys Presents Musical Touken Ranbu × Yomiuri Giants Collaboration Night" the opening ceremony, which held at the Tokyo Dome on September 11, 2018. He also performed with other Touken Danshi in the 69th NHK Kōhaku Uta Gassen on December 31 of the same year.

In April 2019, Miura was selected as the youngest ever to play the role of Marius in the musical "Les Miserables", and stood on the stage of the Imperial Theater for the first time.

In March 2020, Miura debuted and starred in the Theater Creation with The Little Shop of Horrors the Musical.

In 2022, Miura played the role of Haku in Spirited Away the Stage, and integrated his own ballet experience into the transformation scene and get acclaim.

In February 2023, Kingdom the Stage became Miura's first starring role in the Imperial Theater.

In 2024, Miura won 49th Kikuta Kazuo Theater Award.

== Achievements ==
=== Ballet ===
- 22nd National Ballet Competition in Nagoya - Men's Junior A (2012): 1st place
- 18th NBA Ballet Competition - contemporary(2015): 3rd place

=== Stage ===
- 49th Kikuta Kazuo Theater Award
- 2023 All About Musical・Award: Rising Star Award

== Stage performances ==
=== Japanese and Asian original musicals and plays ===
- Kirameki Project vol.0『Haruka UEDA 30th Anniversary』(2013)
- ENTERTAINMENT DANCE ART SHOW『BLUE WHITE』(2014)
- Kirameki Project vol.1『Miracle Wave』(2014)
- Opera『Rokumeikan』(2014)
- Dramatic・super・dance・theater『Salomé』(2014)
- Hamlet no Monogatari (2014) as Hamlet
- Rock Ballet "Yoshitsune"(2015) as Minamoto no Yoshitsune
- Tokyo One Piece Tower ONE PIECE LIVE ATTRACTION (2015) as Monkey D. Luffy
- 『DANCE SYMPHONY』Saishuu Gakusho〜THE DANCERS〜(2015)
- Dance with Devils the Stage(2015) as Ritsuka Tachibana(Performance Only)
- Koisuru Broadway Series
  - Koisuru Broadway♪vol.4 (2015)
  - Koisuru Broadway〜It's festival!〜 (2016)
  - Koisuru Broadway♪vol.6 (2019)
- TENIMYU: The Prince of Tennis Musical 3rd Season Series as Keigo Atobe
  - The Prince of Tennis Musical: Seigaku VS Hyotei (2016)
  - The Prince of Tennis Musical: Seigaku VS Rokkaku (2016)
  - The Prince of Tennis Musical: TEAM Live HYŌTEI (2017)
  - The Prince of Tennis Musical: Dream Live 2017 (2017)
  - The Prince of Tennis Musical: Nationals Seigaku VS Hyotei (2018)
  - The Prince of Tennis Musical: Autumn Sports Festival 2019 (2019)
  - The Prince of Tennis Musical: The Prince of Tennis 3rd Season: Nationals Seigaku VS Rikkai Second Half (2019)
- Touken Ranbu Musical as Higekiri
  - Touken Ranbu：The Musical Tsuwamono Domo ga Yume no Ato (2017)
  - Touken Ranbu：The Musical Shinkenranbusai 2017 (2017)
  - Touken Ranbu：The Musical Shinkenranbusai 2018 (2018)
  - Touken Ranbu：The Musical HIGEKIRI HIZAMARU DUO PERFORMANCE2019 ～SOGA～ (2019)
  - Touken Ranbu：The Musical HIGEKIRI HIZAMARU DUO PERFORMANCE2020 ～SOGA～ (2020)
  - Touken Ranbu：The Musical ”Iwainokuju Ranbuongyokusai” (2024)
- Yugeki Stage (2017) as Seiji
- Onmyoji Musical ～Heianemaki～ (2018) as Minamoto no Hiromasa
- Koi wo Yomu「Boku ha Asu, Konou no Kimi to Date Suru (My Tomorrow, Your Yesterday)」(2018) as Takatoshi Minamiyama
- Nostalgic Wonderland♪ Series
  - Nostalgic Wonderland♪ 〜song & dance show〜(2018)
  - Nostalgic Wonderland♪ 〜song&dance show 2019〜 (2019)
  - Nostalgic Wonderland♪～song & dance show～ 2020 (2020)
- STAGE GATE VR THEATER vol.1『Defiled』(2020) as Harry Mendelson
- Oh My Diner the Musical Series
  - Oh My Diner the Musical (2020) as Prince Cooper
  - Oh My Diner -Dancing Buzzing Rhapsody- (2022) as Prince Cooper
- SPIRITED AWAY the Stage
  - SPIRITED AWAY the Stage (2022) as Haku
  - SPIRITED AWAY the Stage (2023) as Haku
  - SPIRITED AWAY the Stage (2024) as Haku
- Kingdom the Stage (2023) as Shin
- Why don’t you SWING BY? (2023)
- Nodame Cantabile the Musical (2023–2025) as Shinichi Chiaki
- Medea/Easun (2024)
- Navillera the Musical (2024) as Lee Chae-rok
- BOLERO -Last Chapter- (2024)
- Death Note: The Musical (2025) as L
- Dorian Gray (2026)

=== European and American musicals and plays under Japanese production ===
- Les Misérables (2019–2021 and 2024–2025) as Marius Pontmercy
- Little Shop of Horrors (2020–2021) as Seymour Krelborn
- Hairspray (2020–2022) as Link Larkin
- Spamalot (2021) as Sir Galahad
- Grease (2021) as Danny Zuko
- The Red and the Black (2023) as Julien Sorel
- Everybody's Talking About Jamie (2025) as Jamie New
- Me and My Girl (2026) as Bill Snibson

== Live ==
- I'M A SHOW OPENING SPECIAL SERIES "Hiroki Miura × Akiyoshi Utsumi BFF LIVE 〜Summer Xmas〜 " (2022)
- Hiroki Miura "My First" (2023)
- Hiroki Miura "My Moment My Day" (2024)

== Radio ==
- 三浦宏規 MAKE RADIO

== Radio drama ==
- Radio Drama "The Sound of My Hometown Rides on The Wind " (2022) as Shota

== Official photobooks ==
- Gekkan Hiroki Miura (2019)
- Artist Book "LE PRESAGE" (2020)
