= Attack on Titan =

Japanese manga series and franchise

- First tankōbon volume cover, featuring Eren Yeager about to attack the Colossal Titan

進撃の巨人 (Shingeki no Kyojin)
- Genre: Action; Dark fantasy; Post-apocalyptic
- Manga
- Written by: Hajime Isayama
- Published by: Kodansha
- English publisher: NA: Kodansha USA
- Imprint: Shōnen Magazine Comics
- Magazine: Bessatsu Shōnen Magazine
- Original run: September 9, 2009 – April 9, 2021
- Volumes: 34
- Anime television series
- Attack on Titan (2013–2023)
- Live-action
- Attack on Titan (film); Attack on Titan: Counter Rockets (miniseries); Attack on Titan: The Musical
- Related media
- Attack on Titan novels; Attack on Titan manga spin-offs; Attack on Titan video games
- icon

Attack on Titan (Japanese: 進撃の巨人, Hepburn: Shingeki no Kyojin; lit. 'The Advancing Giant') is a Japanese manga series written and illustrated by Hajime Isayama. Set in a world where humanity is forced to live in cities surrounded by three enormous walls that protect them from gigantic man-eating humanoids referred to as Titans, the story follows Eren Yeager, an adolescent boy who vows to exterminate the Titans after they bring about the destruction of his hometown and the death of his mother. It was serialized in Kodansha's monthly magazine Bessatsu Shōnen Magazine from September 2009 to April 2021, with its chapters collected in 34 tankōbon volumes.

An anime television series was produced by Wit Studio (seasons 1–3) and MAPPA (season 4). A 25-episode first season was broadcast from April to September 2013, followed by a 12-episode second season broadcast from April to June 2017. A 22-episode third season was broadcast in two parts, with the first 12 episodes airing from July to October 2018 and the last 10 episodes airing from April to July 2019. A fourth and final season premiered in December 2020, airing 16 episodes in its first part. A second part consisting of 12 episodes aired from January to April 2022, and the third and fourth parts aired in two specials; the first premiered in March 2023, and the second premiered in November 2023.

Attack on Titan has been met with critical and commercial success. By November 2023, the manga had over 140 million copies in circulation, making it one of the best-selling manga series of all time. It has won several awards, including the Kodansha Manga Award, the Attilio Micheluzzi Award, and the Harvey Award.

== Synopsis ==
=== Setting ===
A map of Walls and the districts therein: Maria Rose Sina

Attack on Titan centers on a civilization within three circular walls. According to local belief, it is the last surviving vestige of human civilization. Its inhabitants, known as Eldians, have been led to believe that, over one hundred years ago, humanity was driven to the brink of extinction by the emergence of humanoid giants called Titans, which attack and eat humans on sight. The last remnants of humanity retreated behind three concentric walls and enjoyed roughly a century of peace. Within the walls, residents are strongly discouraged from venturing outside. To combat Titans, the country's military employs Vertical Maneuvering Equipment (VME), also known as Omni-Directional Maneuvering Gear (ODM gear), a set of waist-mounted grappling hooks and gas-powered propulsion that enables mobility in three dimensions. Swords made of ultrahard steel are used in conjunction with the gear, and later, rocket launcher–like weapons known as Thunder Spears are developed by commander Hange Zoë.

Titans are classified into several types. Pure Titans are the weakest and most common, whose predictable behavior makes them easier to kill. Abnormal Titans are Pure Titans whose behavior is less predictable, making them harder to face in combat. The Nine Titans, also known as Titan Shifters, are the Attack, Colossal, Armored, Female, Beast, Jaw, Cart, War Hammer, and Founding Titans. They are the strongest Titans; each is able to shift back and forth between human and Titan form to access their Titan's abilities. Many Titan shifters possess the ability to harden certain parts of their bodies at will, typically in order to make them nearly impenetrable, or to strengthen their blows during combat.

Pure Titans are created by injecting Eldians with Titan spinal fluid. If a Pure Titan consumes a human who possesses one of the Nine Titans, that Eldian will revert to human form and gain that Shifter's powers, whereupon they are cursed to live only 13 more years. If the powers are not inherited by another Eldian before the holder's death, they are passed to an Eldian baby born shortly thereafter, regardless of distance or blood relations. As the story progresses, the true nature of the Titans and the existence of civilization outside the walls are revealed.

=== Plot ===
Eren Yeager is a boy who lives in the town of Shiganshina, located on the outermost of three circular walls which protect their inhabitants from Titans. In the year 845, the first wall, Wall Maria, is breached by two new types of Titans, the Colossal Titan and the Armored Titan. During the incident, Eren's mother is eaten by a Smiling Titan while Eren escapes. He swears revenge on all Titans and enlists in the military along with his childhood friends Mikasa Ackerman and Armin Arlert.

Five years after Shiganshina's fall, the Colossal Titan attacks the city of Trost, located in the second innermost wall, Wall Rose. Eren helps to successfully defend the city after he discovers a mysterious ability to turn himself into a sentient Attack Titan. Additionally, he regains memories of his father Grisha Yeager giving him this ability shortly after the fall of Wall Maria, and telling him that the truth about their world can be found in their basement in Shiganshina. These events draw the attention of the Survey Corps and their commander, Erwin Smith, who intend to use his power to reclaim Wall Maria and reach the Yeagers' basement. Eren, Mikasa, and Armin are transferred to the Special Operations Squad, under the care of Levi Ackerman and Hange Zoë. During an expedition into the forest between the walls, Eren and his companions encounter a sentient Female Titan, who is later revealed to be their fellow military comrade Annie Leonhart. With help from his friends, Eren fights and defeats Annie, who encases herself in crystal and is put in custody. After the fight, it is discovered that there are Titans lying dormant within the walls, known as Wall Titans.

Shortly thereafter, Pure Titans mysteriously appear within Wall Rose with no evidence of how they got in, accompanied by the sentient Beast Titan. Ymir, one of the new Survey Corps graduates, reveals that she can transform into the sentient Jaw Titan, while Ymir's close friend Krista Lenz reveals herself as Historia Reiss, a member of the royal family. Two other members of the Survey Corps, Reiner Braun and Bertholt Hoover, reveal themselves as the Armored and Colossal Titan respectively. They attempt to kidnap Eren and Ymir, but fail. In the ensuing battle, Eren discovers another power within himself called "the Coordinate", that allows him to control other Titans, which he uses to kill the Smiling Titan and send a horde of Pure Titans to attack Reiner and Bertholt. This forces the two to escape, and Ymir willingly flees with them, offering herself as a sacrifice to prevent Historia from being targeted by the enemy. In the aftermath of these events, it is determined that the Pure Titans who suddenly appeared within Wall Rose were the inhabitants of various villages within Wall Rose, who had in some way been transformed into Titans. This leads the characters to the conclusion that all Pure Titans are, in fact, transformed human beings.

Eren and his friends join Levi Squad while the Survey Corps is targeted by the Military Police led by Kenny Ackerman, Levi's uncle. In the occasion, they discover that by transforming into a Pure Titan via a serum made of Titan spinal fluid and eating another Titan shifter, a person can inherit its abilities, and that Historia and her father, Rod Reiss, are the only surviving members of the royal bloodline. Rod kidnaps Eren because he is in possession of the Founding Titan, obtained by his father Grisha upon eating Frieda Reiss (Historia's half-sister), and by Eren through eating his father. Rod tries to convince Historia to allow herself to be transformed into a Titan, so she can eat Eren and regain the Founder's power. After Historia refuses and breaks Rod's vial of spinal fluid, Rod attempts to consume the serum himself, transforming into a monstrously large Abnormal Titan and mortally wounding Kenny; he is then killed by Historia (with the help of the Survey Corps), who is thereafter declared Queen.

Having resolved the political unrest, the Survey Corps lead a successful operation to recapture Shiganshina, fighting the Beast, Colossal, Armored, and Cart Titans but suffering massive casualties, wherein Erwin dies in a suicide run against the Beast Titan, and Armin gains ownership of the Colossal Titan when Levi injects him with a serum given by Kenny, causing Armin to eat Bertholt. Eren and his companions return to his childhood home, where they discover the truth of their world: they are actually Eldians, sworn enemies of the conquering Marleyans who were enclosed within the walls after the original King Karl Fritz fled from the war. They are not the last humans as they were told, but rather an enclosed sect of Eldians on an isolated island called Paradis. Because they are "Subjects of Ymir" who can be turned into Titans by being injected with Titan spinal fluid, the Eldians continue to be oppressed by Marley. In the year after the battle of Shiganshina, the Survey Corps kill all of the remaining Pure Titans on the island.

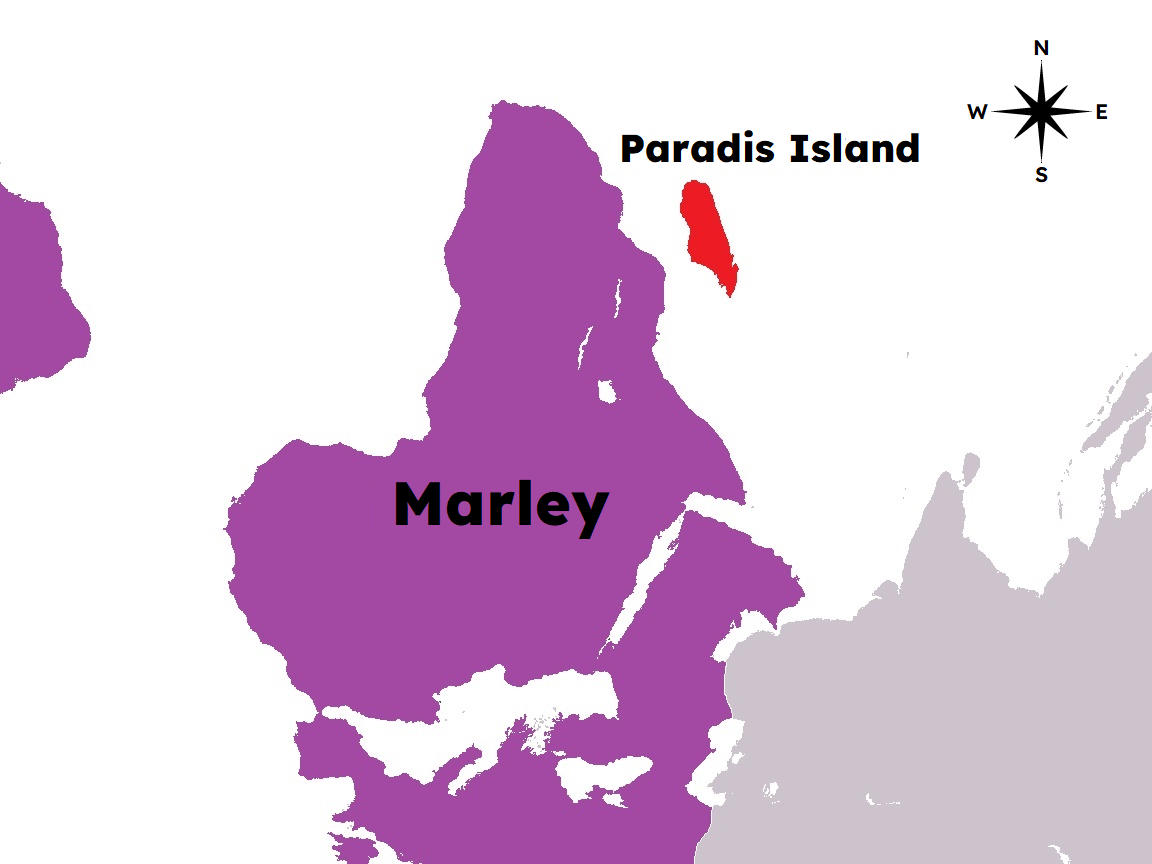
A map of the world of Attack on Titan, which resembles Earth's continents flipped over the x-axis (south-up map orientation)

Three years later, the Survey Corps launch an attack against the Marleyan capital of Liberio, orchestrated by Eren and his half-brother Zeke, who is the owner of the Beast Titan. Eren kills Willy Tybur, an Eldian who (along with his family) had been controlling Marley from the shadows and gains ownership of the War Hammer Titan after eating its previous owner, Willy's sister Lara. Eren is imprisoned for acting against orders but escapes with a faction of extremist Paradis soldiers called the Yeagerists. Zeke is kept in Levi's custody but manages to escape, severely injuring but not killing him. Marley's air fleet, led by Reiner, launch an invasion of Paradis, and chaos breaks out in the ensuing battle. Eren and Zeke reunite, which leads them to the Paths—a series of atemporal gateways connecting all Eldians through time and space. There, they meet the consciousness of Ymir Fritz—the original Titan—whose tortured past led to her imprisonment within the Paths for thousands of years. Zeke attempts to convince Ymir to fulfill his wish to stop the Subjects of Ymir from reproducing via mass sterilization. (Note: Zeke's plan is repeatedly referred to in the series as "euthanasia", however it is clear from its description that the characters truly mean sterilization.) Eren, however, convinces Ymir to use her power to bring about the Rumbling—unleashing thousands of Wall Titans kept within Paradis's walls and leading them on a genocidal march to kill everyone outside the island.

The Survey Corps ally with the remaining Marleyan forces, including Reiner and a newly freed Annie, to stop Eren. They defeat the Yeagerists before confronting him, though many are killed, including Hange. Levi kills Zeke and Mikasa kills Eren, which causes the mysterious creature that is the source of all Titans' powers to die and the power of the Titans to vanish, reverting all Titans to human form, and stripping the Titan Shifters of their powers, thereby freeing all Eldians from the curse. His death also releases memory blocks that he put on his friends, revealing that what transpired was part of Eren's plan to spare twenty percent of humanity, with Armin, Levi, Mikasa, and the others being recognized as heroes in the eyes of the world for killing him and stopping the Rumbling. Three years later, as Paradis and the rest of the world rebuilds, Armin and his allies begin peace negotiations led by Queen Historia. Mikasa buries Eren underneath a tree on a hill near Shiganshina District. (Note: This is the point where the series originally ended in monthly serialization. The remainder of the ending was included as additional pages in the manga's 34th volume.) The tree grows over time to resemble the one where the organism that granted Ymir her Titan power lived. An unspecified amount of time after Mikasa's death from old age, a modernized Shiganshina is reduced to rubble in a war. The series ends with a boy and his dog approaching the tree, which has now become surrounded by wilderness.

== Production ==
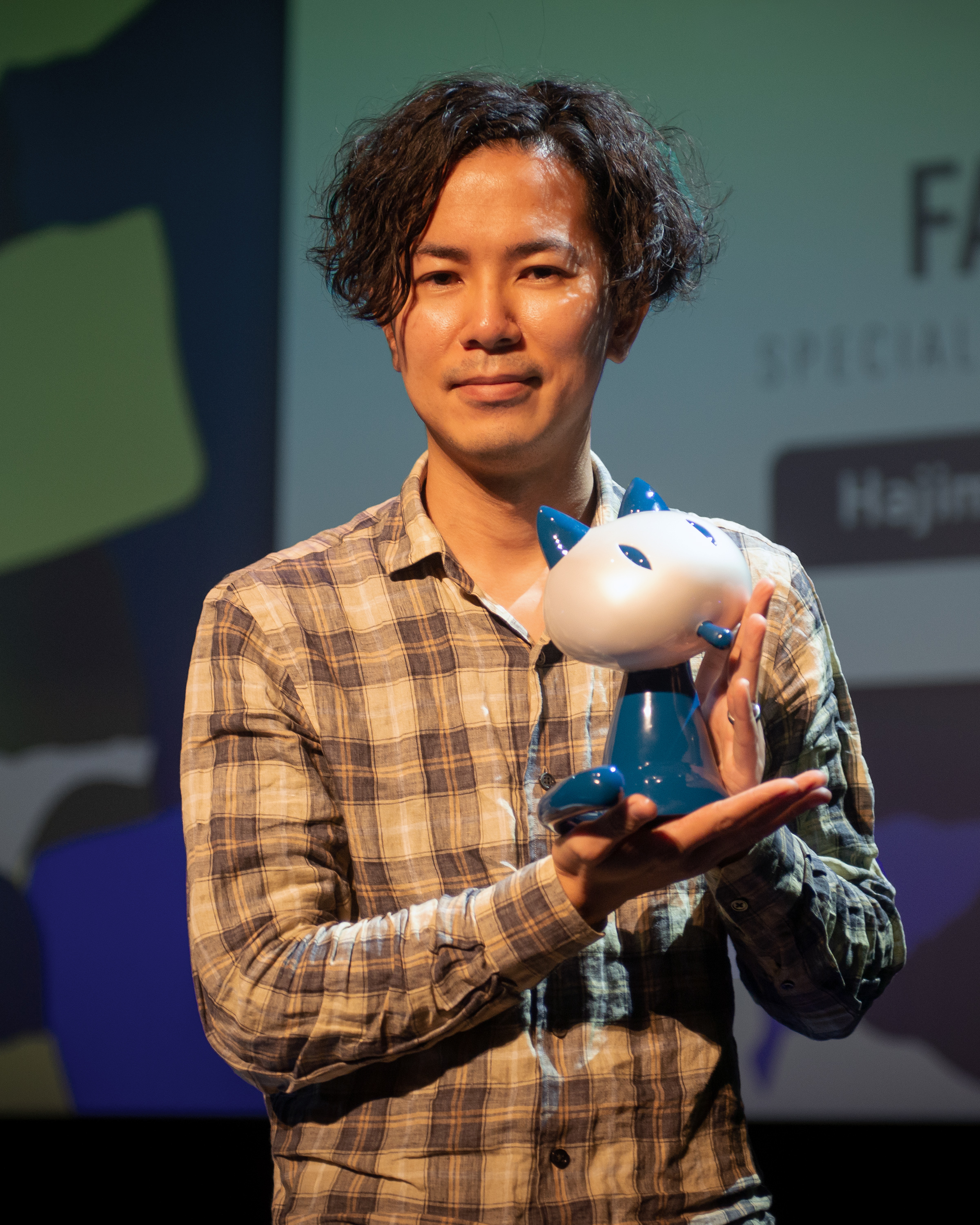
Author Hajime Isayama

Hajime Isayama created a 65-page one-shot version of Attack on Titan in 2006. Originally, he offered his work to the Weekly Shōnen Jump department at Shueisha, where the editor of the department asked him to modify a few details in the story and artwork, which Isayama refused. He then brought the manga to the Weekly Shōnen Magazine department at Kodansha. Before serialization began in 2009, he had already thought of ideas for plot twists, although they were fleshed out as the series progressed. Isayama initially based the scenery in the manga on that of his hometown of Hita, Ōita, which is surrounded by mountains. While working at an internet cafe, Isayama encountered a drunken customer who grabbed him by the collar. It was this incident that showed him "the fear of meeting a person I can't communicate with", which is the feeling that he conveys through the Titans. When designing the appearances of the Titans, he used several models such as martial artist Yushin Okami for Eren Yeager's Titan form, as well as Brock Lesnar for the Armored Titan. George Wada, the anime's producer, stated that the "Wall of Fear" was influenced by the isolated and enclosed nature of Japanese culture. He also said that the inner feelings of every individual is one of the series' main themes. Isayama later would confirm that Attack on Titan was inspired in part by Muv-Luv Alternative, the second installment of the Muv-Luv visual novel series. Isayama also noted that his image of carnivorous titans was inspired by Gyaos from the Gamera franchise, The War of the Gargantuas, Man-eating Mona Lisa from the Jigoku Sensei Nūbē series, and the dinosaurs from the Jurassic Park series.

Isayama estimated his basic monthly timeline as one week to storyboard and three weeks to actually draw the chapter. The story was planned out in advance, which involved marking down which collected volumes a specific "truth" would be revealed. In September 2013, Isayama stated that he was aiming to end the series in 20 volumes. Originally, he planned to give the series a tragic conclusion similar to that of the film adaptation of Stephen King's The Mist, where every character dies. Positive reception to the manga and anime caused the author to consider changing the ending due to the impact it could have on fans. In November 2018, the Japanese documentary program Jōnetsu Tairiku aired an episode about Isayama's struggles to complete the manga, in which he confirmed that Attack on Titan had entered its final story arc. In December 2019, Isayama said he was planning to end the manga in 2020. In June 2020, Isayama stated that there was only 5% of the manga left, and he expected to end it in the upcoming year, closing off the original storyline of the series by finally bringing the plot to its conclusion. In November 2020, Isayama stated that the manga was 1% to 2% away from completion, and stated that he planned to end it the same year. In January 2021, it was announced that the series would be finished after an eleven-year publication run on April 9, 2021.

== Media ==
=== Manga ===
Attack on Titan is written and illustrated by Hajime Isayama. The series began in the first-ever issue of Kodansha's monthly publication Bessatsu Shōnen Magazine, released on September 9, 2009. The manga was finished after an eleven-year publication run with the release of its 139th chapter on April 9, 2021. On November 8, 2020, it was announced that the manga would receive a full color serialization. Kodansha collected its chapters in 34 tankōbon volumes, released from March 17, 2010, to June 9, 2021.

In North America, the series was published in English by Kodansha USA. The first volume was published on June 19, 2012, and the last on October 19, 2021.

==== Spin-offs ====
A chibi parody spin-off based on the series, titled Attack on Titan: Junior High (進撃！巨人中学校, Shingeki! Kyojin Chūgakkō) and written by Saki Nakagawa, began serialization in Bessatsu Shōnen Magazine's May 2012 issue. It follows the main characters as they battle the Titans while in junior high school. Another manga series based on the prequel light novel series Attack on Titan: Before the Fall started serialization in Kodansha's Monthly Shōnen Sirius in August 2013, illustrated by Satoshi Shiki. An additional spin-off based on the No Regrets visual novel was serialized in the manga magazine Aria, titled Attack on Titan: No Regrets (進撃の巨人 悔いなき選択, Shingeki no Kyojin: Kuinaki Sentaku). It was written by Gun Snark and illustrated by Hikaru Suruga. It focuses on the origins of Levi Ackerman one of the most prominent characters in the main series. A yonkoma spin-off, called Spoof on Titan (寸劇の巨人, Sungeki no Kyojin; "Titan Short Skits"), illustrated by Hounori, was released on Kodansha's Manga Box smartphone and tablet application from December 2013 to December 30, 2014, in both Japanese and English. A manga adaptation of Hiroshi Seko's Attack on Titan: Lost Girls novel, written and illustrated by Ryōsuke Fuji, began publication in Bessatsu Shōnen Magazine on August 9, 2015.

The first three spin-off manga were also licensed by Kodansha USA, which published the first volume of each between March and June 2014. The publisher announced at New York Comic Con in October 2015 that it had licensed Spoof on Titan, and in March 2016, it announced the licensing of Lost Girls.

=== Novels ===
A light novel series titled Attack on Titan: Before the Fall (進撃の巨人 Before the Fall), written by Ryō Suzukaze and illustrated by Thores Shibamoto, began on April 1, 2011. Its story is set before the events of the manga and it was published by Kodansha in three volumes. The first tells the story of Angel, the blacksmith who develops the first prototypes of the Vertical Maneuvering Equipment, and the following two follow a young man who was found as a baby in the stomach of a Titan. A second light novel series called Attack on Titan: Harsh Mistress of the City (進撃の巨人 隔絶都市の女王, Shingeki no Kyojin Kakuzetsu Toshi no Joō), written by Ryō Kawakami and illustrated by Range Murata, was published between August 1, 2014, and May 1, 2015. Vertical released the novels in North America in 2014 and 2015. A novel titled Attack on Titan: Lost Girls (進撃の巨人 Lost Girls), written by Hiroshi Seko, was published on December 9, 2014. It comprises three short stories featuring Mikasa and Annie Leonhart, titled "Lost in the cruel world", "Wall Sina, Goodbye", and "Lost Girls". It was also released in English by Vertical in 2016. Garrison Girl: An Attack on Titan Novel, a novel written by American author Rachel Aaron, was published by Quirk Books on August 7, 2018. It is centered on Rosalie Dumarque, who defies her family to join the military garrison.

=== Anime ===
An anime television series based on the manga was produced by Wit Studio and directed by Tetsurō Araki. The first season aired between April 7, 2013, and September 29, 2013, originally on Mainichi Broadcasting System (MBS). The second and the third season, directed by Masashi Koizuka, first aired from April 1 to June 17, 2017, and from July 23, 2018, to July 1, 2019, respectively on MBS and NHK General TV. Upon the airing of the final episode of the third season on July 1, 2019, it was announced that the fourth and final season of the anime series was scheduled for release in Fall 2020 on NHK General. On September 23, 2020, NHK listed the final season on their broadcasting schedule. The series was announced to have changed studios, with production being taken over by MAPPA. The fourth season premiered on December 7, 2020. Producer Toshihiro Maeda said that Wit Studio refused to produce the final season "due to scheduling" issues. The final season's main staff includes directors Yuichiro Hayashi and Jun Shishido (chief), character designer Tomohiro Kishi, art director Kazuo Ogura, 3D CG Director Takahiro Uezono, scriptwriter Hiroshi Seko, and music composers Hiroyuki Sawano and Kohta Yamamoto. For the final season, former 3D CG Director Shuuhei Yabuta was the only returning staff member from Wit Studio. The first 16 episodes of season 4 aired until March 29, 2021, and the second part, consisting of 12 episodes, aired from January 10 to April 4, 2022. The third and fourth parts initially aired as two television specials; the first premiered on March 4, 2023, while the second premiered on November 5 of that same year.

Other Attack on Titan-related manga or light novels were also adapted into anime. Two original animation DVD (OAD) episodes, based on the Attack on Titan: No Regrets prequel manga, were bundled with the 15th and 16th volumes of the main series, released on December 9, 2014, and April 9, 2015, respectively. An anime television adaptation of Attack on Titan: Junior High began airing in October 2015. The series was directed by Yoshihide Ibata at Production I.G. A three-part OAD miniseries of Attack on Titan: Lost Girls was released in 2017 and 2018 with the limited editions of volumes 24, 25, and 26.

=== Video games ===
- There have been four video game adaptations of Attack on Titan developed by Nitroplus staffers in collaboration with Production I.G. Nitroplus clarified that the studio as a company was not involved in the Attack on Titan Blu-ray Disc games, while individual staffers are. The games are visual novels and were included in the first copies of the third and sixth Blu-ray Disc volumes of the anime. The games cover spin-off stories about the characters of Attack on Titan. Isayama supervised the development of the games.
- The third Blu-ray volume was released on September 18 with Seko's Lost in the Cruel World visual novel about Mikasa, and a preview of Gun Snark's No Regrets (悔いなき選択, Kuinaki Sentaku; lit. "A Choice with No Regrets"). The sixth Blu-ray volume was released on December 18 with the full version of No Regrets about Levi and Erwin's past, Jin Haganeya's visual novel In the Forest of the Night, Burning Bright about Eren and Levi, and Seko's Wall Sina, Goodbye visual novel about Annie.
- An action game, titled Attack on Titan: Humanity in Chains (進撃の巨人 ～反撃の翼～, Shingeki no Kyojin ~Hangeki no Tsubasa~; subtitle lit. "Wings of Counterattack"), was developed by Spike Chunsoft for the Nintendo 3DS and released in Japan on December 5, 2013, North America on May 12, 2015, and Europe on July 2, 2015.
- A smartphone social game, titled Attack on Titan: Howl Toward Freedom (Shingeki no Kyojin ~Jiyū e no Hōkō~) is in development by Mobage for iOS and Android platforms. In the game, players play as a character who has been exiled from Wall Rose. Players must build and fortify a town outside the wall and expand it by manufacturing items as well as using Titans and exploiting resources from other players.
- A set of Attack on Titan costumes was added to Dead or Alive 5 Last Round in July 2016, alongside a playable arena based on Wall Rose during an attack by the Colossal Titan.
- Attack on Titan gameplay and merchandise has been featured in a crossover event with Nexon MMORPG MapleStory in its Japanese and GMS versions.
- Another game, Attack on Titan, for PlayStation 4, PlayStation 3, and PlayStation Vita, published by Koei Tecmo and developed by Omega Force, was announced at Gamescom 2015. It was released on February 18, 2016, in Japan. Later was confirmed to be released worldwide along with Windows and Xbox One versions.
- Capcom announced that they were developing an Attack on Titan arcade game named Shingeki no Kyojin: Team Battle, but the game was cancelled in 2018.
- Attack on Titan: Escape from Certain Death was announced to be in development for the Nintendo 3DS in Famitsu magazine in October 2016. The game was initially supposed to be launched on March 30, 2017, but was later postponed to May 11, 2017.
- Attack on Titan 2: Future Coordinates was released on November 30, 2017, in Japan.
- A sequel game to Koei Tecmo's Attack on Titan, Attack on Titan 2, was announced in August 2017 and released in March 2018.
- An expansion for Attack on Titan 2, Attack on Titan 2: Final Battle was released in Japan on July 4, 2019, and in North America and Europe on July 5, and is available on PlayStation 4, Nintendo Switch, Xbox One (with Xbox One X support), and on Windows through Steam.
- An Attack on Titan mobile game was announced for release on iOS and Android devices at the end of 2016 but was later delayed. In May 2018, it was announced that the mobile game has been titled Attack on Titan: Assault. The game was released on June 16, 2019, developed by GameSamba.
- Attack on Titan: Tactics was announced on April 18, 2019, and released on September 19, 2019, on Android and iOS. The game is developed by DeNA.
- Attack on Titan characters appeared in the mobile video game Symphogear XD Unlimited in 2020.
- Attack on Titan: Brave Order was announced on September 9, 2021, and released on February 11, 2022, on Android and iOS. The mobile game is developed by Enish.
- Call of Duty Vanguard featured packs related to Attack on Titan, adding two new skins and weapons related to the anime.
- Fortnite Battle Royale included Eren Yeager as the secret outfit of its Chapter 4 Season 2 Battle Pass in 2023, joined by Mikasa Ackerman and Levi Ackerman outfits, later released in the item shop. In game, ODM Gear and Thunder Spears were added as mythic weapons.
- A collaboration with Assassin's Creed Shadows includes a free story quest and some paid cosmetics with an Attack on Titan theme. The bonus content features original characters like Gautwin and Ada. The collaboration was available from November 26 to December 22, 2025.
- At the 2026 Summer Game Fest, Koei Tecmo and Omega Force announced Attack on Titan 3. It is set to release for Windows, PlayStation 5, Xbox Series X/S, and Nintendo Switch 2 on December 10, 2026.

=== Live-action ===
A live-action film was announced to be in production in October 2011. In December 2012, it was reported that Tetsuya Nakashima left his position as director. According to film distributor Toho, Nakashima had considerable creative differences on the scriptwriting and other matters. In December 2013, Shinji Higuchi was revealed to be directing, and would also be responsible with the special effects. Writer Yūsuke Watanabe and critic/subculture expert Tomohiro Machiyama were announced to be scripting the movie with series creator Isayama. In July 2014, it was revealed that two films would be released in the summer of 2015. It was also revealed that some major characters would be cut from the line up, most noticeably Levi Ackerman and Erwin Smith. A teaser trailer for the first live-action film was released in March 2015. The following month, Toho released the second trailer for the first film, and announced the second installment would be called Attack on Titan: End of the World. In June 2015, a third trailer for the first film was released, revealing the Three-Dimensional Maneuvering Gear, as well as confirming the film would be released in IMAX theaters in Japan.

A live-action miniseries, titled Shingeki no Kyojin: Hangeki no Noroshi (進撃の巨人 反撃の狼煙; "Attack on Titan: Counter Rockets") and utilizing the same actors as the films, started streaming on NTT DoCoMo's online-video service dTV on August 15, 2015. The three-episode series focuses on Zoë Hange and her research of the Titans, as well as how the Vertical Maneuvering Equipment was created.

A stage play titled Live Impact was announced on the wraparound jacket band on Volume 21. It was scheduled to run from July 28 to September 3, 2017. The stage play was cancelled after one of the staff members was involved in an accident.

Deadline Hollywood reported on January 17, 2017, that Warner Bros. was in negotiations to secure the film rights to the Attack on Titan franchise. Harry Potter and Fantastic Beasts and Where to Find Them producer David Heyman was on board to produce a proposed two-film project that would remake the 2015 Japanese live-action film adaptations. A day later, however, Kodansha representatives said there were no negotiations with Warner Bros. However, on October 29, 2018, it was revealed that Warner Bros. and Kodansha finalized a deal to produce a live-action adaptation, with It director Andy Muschietti signing on to direct the film.

=== Other media ===
Two guidebooks to the manga titled Inside and Outside were released on April 9 and September 9, 2013, featuring concept art, character profiles and interviews. They were combined into one and released in North America on September 16, 2014, by Kodansha USA. A 16-minute drama CD was created with the anime's staff and included in the January 2014 issue of Bessatsu Shōnen Magazine. An art book called Fly, bundling a booklet Attack on Titan Volume 35, which contains the one-shot manga "Bad Boy" focusing on Levi's childhood, was released on May 2, 2024.

On November 3, 2014, American writer C. B. Cebulski revealed that a crossover between Attack on Titan and Marvel Comics was in the works. Cebulski scripted the scenario written by Isayama. The one-shot crossover featured Spider-Man, the Avengers and the Guardians of the Galaxy facing off against several Titans, including the Colossal Titan, the Armored Titan, and the Female Titan on the streets of New York City. During Free Comic Book Day 2015, Marvel's Secret Wars preview included an 8-page presentation "Attack on Avengers" by Isayama with art by Gerardo Sandoval. It was announced at the 2015 New York Comic Con that an American comic book titled Attack on Titan Anthology would be published.

From January 23 to May 10, 2015, Universal Studios Japan hosted attractions based on Attack on Titan. "The Real" Attack on Titan Experience featured a life-size 15-meter-tall (49 ft) Eren titan engaging a 14-meter-tall (46 ft) female titan in combat. Other attractions include a ground level titan, which visitors could pose with. From May 31 to August 25, 2019, Universal Studios Japan hosted attractions for Attack on Titan as part of the "Cool Japan" program, including "immersive effects on a grand scale" according to editor Shintaro Kawakubo. On July 3, 2019, the NHK BS Premium television station program series Fuka Yomi Dokushokai (Reading Too Much Into the Series Book Club) featured a discussion of the Attack on Titan manga series. Attack on Titan is the first manga ever featured on the program.

A musical adaptation of the manga was announced to debut in 2023. It ran at the Orix Theater in Osaka from January 7–9, 2023, and at the Seinenkan Hall in Tokyo from January 14–24. The play was directed by Gō Ueki, written by Masafumi Hata, and Ken the 390 served as the music director with lyrics by Kaori Miura. The cast included Kurumu Okamiya as Eren Yeager, Sara Takatsuki as Mikasa Ackerman, Eito Konishi as Armin Arlert, and Ryo Matsuda as Levi Ackerman. The play was performed internationally at the New York City Center from October 11–13, 2024, with the cast and staff returning to reprise their roles.

== Reception ==
=== Sales ===
The manga's publisher, Kodansha, credits Attack on Titan for the company's first revenue increase in eighteen years. The Attack on Titan anime adaptation is noted to have helped in boosting the manga series' sales while Mainichi Shimbun called it a "once-in-a-decade hit". In April 2014, Oricon reported that 30 million volumes of the series have been sold. By November 2014, the manga had 45 million copies in print. By November 2018, the manga had over 86 million copies in circulation worldwide. By December 2019, the number had increased to 100 million. By September 2022, the manga had over 110 million copies in circulation. By September 2023, it had over 120 million copies in circulation. By November 2023, it had over 140 million copies in circulation. Based on a December 16, 2023, survey conducted by Nikkei Entertainment, the fanbase of Attack on Titan within Japan has an average age of 33 years, and a male-to-female ratio that skews 40:60.

The series' twelfth collected volume was given a first printing of 2.2 million copies, making Attack on Titan one of only three manga series ever to get an initial print surpassing 2 million, the others being One Piece and Demon Slayer: Kimetsu no Yaiba. Volume 13 has the highest initial first print of the series so far, with 2,750,000 copies. It is also the first print run record for its publisher, Kodansha. Attack on Titan was the second highest selling manga series of 2013, with 15,933,801 copies sold in a single year. In the first half of 2014, it topped the chart, ending One Piece's five-year reign as the highest selling series in that period, with Isayama expressing surprise thanking his readers. By the end of the year, it was the second best selling manga with 11,728,368 copies sold. In 2015, the series sold 8.7 million copies ranking third for the year, and 6.5 million copies in 2016 for the fourth rank. It was also the second best-selling manga of 2017, with 6.6 million copies sold. It was the fourth best-selling manga series in the first half of 2021 with over 4 million copies sold, while its thirty-third volume was the 22nd best-selling manga volume. It was the fourth best-selling manga in 2021, with over 7.3 million copies sold, while its thirty-third volume was the 26th best-selling manga volume.

Six of the seven English volumes published in North America at the time charted on The New York Times Manga Best Seller list for the week of October 13, 2013, and volume one was on the list for 81 weeks straight. In June 2015, the first volume clocked in at its 100th week on the top 10 chart, having sold 2.5 million copies. It also currently holds the title of appearing on the list for a volume with 121 weeks. Volume one was also number one on Nielsen BookScan's list of top 20 graphic novels in American bookstores for October 2013, and for the month of September, the series had more volumes on the list than any other series.

=== Critical response ===
Many have analyzed Attack on Titan as representing "the hopelessness felt by young people in today's society". Writer Mao Yamawaki called it a "coming-of-age story of the boys and girls at its core", with a new mystery every episode. It is these mysteries that critic Tomofusa Kure said amplifies readers' expectations. The artwork of the manga has been criticized as crude by some reviewers, with Isayama himself admitting his drawings are "amateurish". However, those same critics stated that after years of serialization, the art was improving, and Kure believes that had the illustrations been "refined", it would not have conveyed the "eeriness" that is a key characteristic of the work. In a short review, Jason Thompson noted how the characters conveniently receive "power-ups" to create plot twists, but concluded that these plot twists and the manga's post-apocalyptic world are "too good to miss".

Attack on Titan has gained a strong popularity not only in Japan, but also throughout the world. For instance, coverage of the anime appeared on the front page of the Hong Kong free newspaper am730 on May 27, 2013, concerning its popularity within Hong Kong as well as in mainland China and Taiwan. The series also attracted criticism: the South Korean Electronic Times magazine accused Attack on Titan of having a militaristic message that served Japanese Prime Minister Shinzo Abe's political leanings. Hong Kong media commentator Wong Yeung-tat praised Isayama's style and the versatility of Attack on Titan's setting, which opens itself to readers' various interpretations.

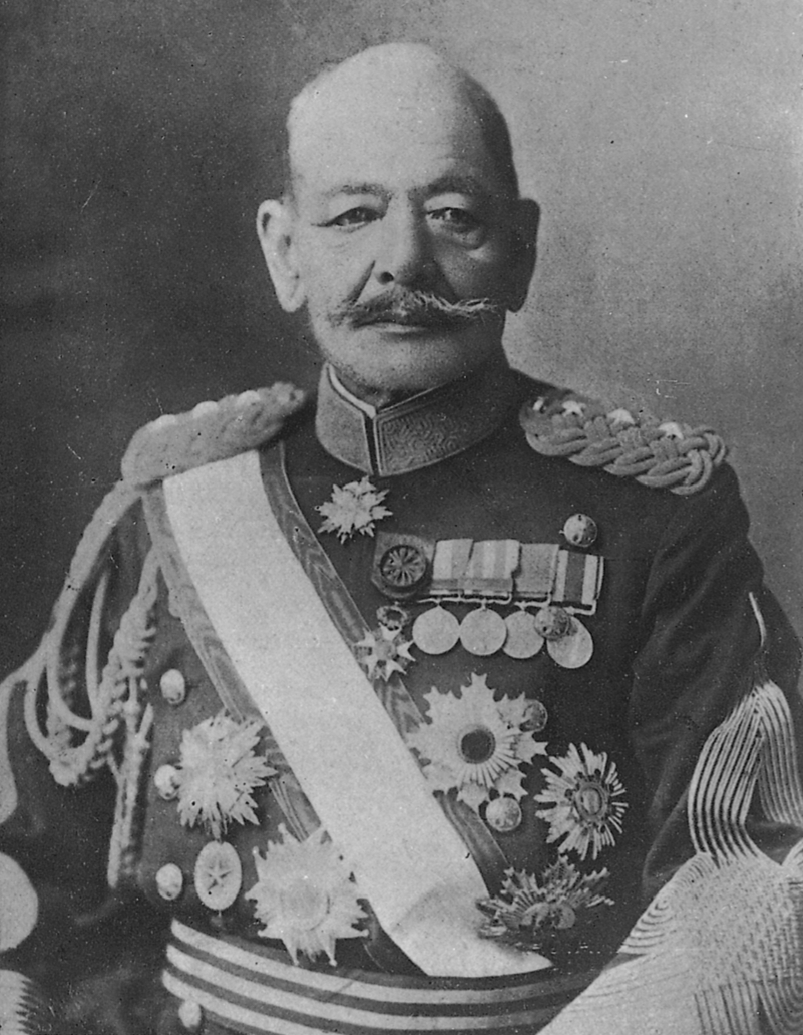
General Akiyama Yoshifuru, to whom Commander Dot Pixis bears a striking resemblance

In 2013, media linked to a 2010 blog post by Isayama indicating that the design of the character Dot Pixis was based on the Imperial Japanese General Akiyama Yoshifuru, whose war record included atrocities during Japanese occupation of Korea and China, such as allowing the Port Arthur massacre to occur. An Internet flame war about the general and his influence on the character ensued on Isayama's blog and included death threats to the author. As many of the threats written in Japanese had grammatical errors, Japanese media outlets claimed that they were written by non-native speakers of the language. A South Korean newspaper reported that Isayama said on his alleged private Twitter account that he viewed Akiyama as an admirable person and was proud to model a character after him. Some Koreans subsequently accused the manga of supporting Japanese right-wing politics. In 2015, the Chinese Ministry of Culture listed Attack on Titan as one of the 38 anime/manga titles banned in China.

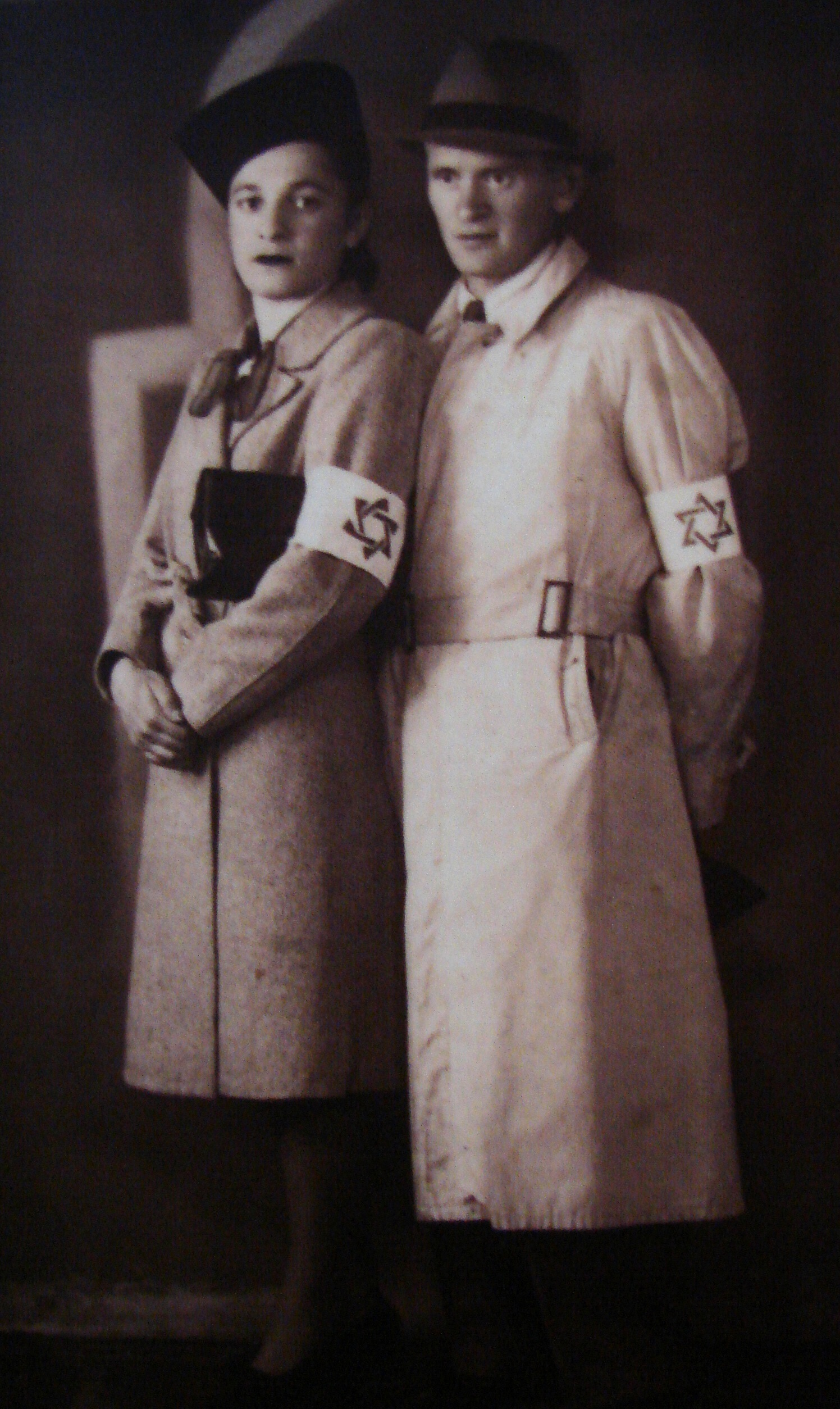
Comparison between the armbands worn by Jewish people in Nazi Germany (left; bearing the Star of David), and those worn by Eldians in Attack on Titan (right; bearing the "Star of Eldia")

Critical interpretations of Attack on Titan highlight characteristics shared by the race of Eldians and the Jewish people, noting their persecution by Marleyans as similar to the Jewish persecution by Nazi Germany. This has led to accusations and theories of antisemitism and fascism directed toward the series and Isayama, including claims that Isayama was promoting nationalism and the conspiracy theory of Jewish global domination. However, opposing arguments have claimed that, while the Eldians mirror the Jewish people, they are intended for readers to sympathize with rather than to be portrayed as villains, as well as the fact that the main characters are Eldian. In 2020, Shaan Amin, writing for The New Republic, identified Attack on Titan as a favorite of alt-right and white nationalist internet communities, while also pointing out that people tend to "sift through stories to find the messages they expect". Attack on Titan characters have been co-opted as symbols by the Nordic Resistance Movement.

Manga artist Makoto Yukimura, creator of Vinland Saga, stated in an interview that he admired Isayama for his work on Attack on Titan, due to his ability to handle the entire plot until the end, especially from the 20th volume. As a result, he considered it one of his favorite manga during its serialization and recommended more people to read it.

=== Censorship ===
Isayama was cited as one of the most frequently banned authors of 2026 amid a surge of book bannings targeting manga in the United States. The 34th volume was included in PEN America's Index of School Book Bans for the first time during the 2025–2026 school year.

=== Accolades ===
Attack on Titan was one of the Manga Division's Jury Recommended Works at the 14th and 15th installments of the Japan Media Arts Festival Awards in 2010 and 2011, respectively. The 2011 edition of Kono Manga ga Sugoi!, which surveys professionals in the manga and publishing industry, named Attack on Titan the best manga series for male readers. The 2012 edition named it the eighth best, while the 2014 edition named it the sixth best. The series won the "Shōnen Tournament 2013" by the editorial staff of the French website Manga-News. On Kadokawa Media Factory's Da Vinci magazine's "Book of the Year" list, Attack on Titan topped the list for two consecutive years in 2013 and 2014. In 2019, Comic Book Resources named Attack on Titan the best manga of the 2010s. On TV Asahi's Manga Sōsenkyo 2021 poll, in which 150,000 people voted for their top 100 manga series, Attack on Titan ranked sixth. The Young Adult Library Services Association in the United States named the series one of its "Great Graphic Novels for Teens" list in 2013. In 2021, the Attack on Titan for Giants large-scale volume broke the Guinness World Record for the "largest comic book published", previously held by Turma da Mônica.

==== Awards and nominations ====
Year	Award	Category	Result	Ref.
2011	35th Kodansha Manga Award	Best Shōnen Manga	Won	
2011	4th Manga Taishō	Best Manga Series	Nominated	
2012	16th Tezuka Osamu Cultural Prize	Grand Prize	Nominated	
2013	20th Anime & Manga Grand Prix	Best Hope Manga	Won	
2013	19th Saló del Manga de Barcelona	Best Shōnen Manga	Won	
2013	6th Bros Comic Award	Grand Prize (Animated Comic)	Won	
2014	18th Tezuka Osamu Cultural Prize	Grand Prize	Nominated	
2014	21st Anime & Manga Grand Prix	Best Manga Series	Won	
2014	E-Book Awards	Grand Prize	Won	
2014	E-Book Awards	Comic Category	Won	
2014	17th Attilio Micheluzzi Award	Best Foreign Series	Won	
2014	True Believer Comic Awards	Favourite Manga	Won	
2014	27th Harvey Award	Best American Edition of Foreign Material	Won	
2014	Pochi Awards	Best Manga International	Won	
2014	20th Saló del Manga de Barcelona	Best Shōnen Manga	Won	
2014	NEO Awards	Best Manga Series	Won	
2015	1st Sugoi Japan Awards	Best Manga Series	Won	
2015	11th AnimaniA Awards	Best Manga International	Won	
2015	Goodreads Choice Awards	Best Graphic Novels & Comics	3rd place	
2021	27th Manga Barcelona Awards	Best Shōnen Manga	Nominated	
2022	French Babelio Readers' Awards	Best Manga Series	Nominated	
2022	53rd Seiun Awards	Best Comic	Nominated	
2026	32nd Manga Barcelona Awards	Best Manga Published in Catalan	Pending	

== In popular culture ==
The Attack on Titan series has been referenced in mainstream pop culture, including commercial advertisements for Subaru, Snickers, and Wonda Coffee. Its characters have been referenced in the animated series The Simpsons and The Amazing World of Gumball, the Korean drama Surplus Princess, and Japanese rock star Yoshiki's fashion brand Yoshikimono. Before the start of the San Diego Padres–Los Angeles Dodgers game held on July 5, 2019, the Colossal Titan mascot made an appearance and performed the ceremonial first pitch before taking a photo-op with Dodgers pitcher Kenta Maeda, who sported a Colossal Titan baseball glove.
