= Mario Kuroba =

Japanese model and actor (born 1993)

- 黒羽 麻璃央
- Born: July 6, 1993 (age 32); Miyagi Prefecture, Japan
- Occupations: Model; actor
- Years active: 2012–present
- Agent: Vithmic
- Spouse: Yuki Sakurai (m. 2022)
- Website: kuroba-mario.com

Mario Kuroba (黒羽 麻璃央, Kuroba Mario; born July 6, 1993) is a Japanese model and actor who is affiliated with Vithmic Co., Ltd.

== Biography ==
Mario Kuroba was born in Miyagi Prefecture, Japan in 1993. In 2010, he won second place in the 23rd Junon Superboy Contest and received the AGF award, kick-starting his career.

In 2012, he made his acting debut as Eiji Kikumaru (7th generation) in Musical: The Prince of Tennis, appearing in the same role until November 2014. He was later cast as Mikazuki Munechika in the Touken Ranbu musicals and as Ryota Kise in the Kuroko's Basketball stage play adaptations.

== Personal life ==
In high school, he was classmates with Japanese actor Toman. He married actress Yuki Sakurai on 11 January 2022.

== Filmography ==
=== Theater ===
Year	Title	Role	Notes	Ref.
2012	Musical: The Prince of Tennis Seigaku Farewell Party	Eiji Kikumaru		
2012	Musical: The Prince of Tennis Seigaku vs. Higa	Eiji Kikumaru		
2013	Musical: The Prince of Tennis Dream Live 2013	Eiji Kikumaru		
2013	Musical: The Prince of Tennis Seigaku vs. Hyotei: Nationals	Eiji Kikumaru		
2013	Musical: The Prince of Tennis Seigaku vs. Shitenhoji	Eiji Kikumaru		
2014	Musical: The Prince of Tennis Seigaku vs. Rikkai: Nationals	Eiji Kikumaru		
2015	Musical: Touken Ranbu Trial Performance	Mikazuki Munechika		
2016	Kuroko's Basketball: The Encounter	Ryota Kise		
2016	Musical: Touken Ranbu Atsukashiyama Ibun	Mikazuki Munechika		
2016	Musical: Touken Ranbu Shinken Ranbu Sai 2016	Mikazuki Munechika		
2017	Kuroko's Basketball: Over-Drive	Ryota Kise		
2017	Musical: Touken Ranbu Tsuwamono Domo ga Yume no Ato	Mikazuki Munechika		
2017	Musical: Touken Ranbu Shinken Ranbu Sai 2017	Mikazuki Munechika		

=== Films ===
Year	Title	Role	Notes	Ref.
2018	Lost in Ramen	Igarashi		
2019	Go Away, Ultramarine	Nado		
2022	Baseball Club Rhapsody	Kimiyoshi Higaki		
2022	Sadako DX	Kanden/Takashi		
2023	Dependence	Shuichi Sonoda	Lead role	
2023	Kumo to Saru no Kazoku	Juzaburo		
2023	Hard Days	Matsuda		
2024	Love You as the World Ends: The Final	Yuya Kaji		
2024	Renji Himuro	Masato Shinohara		
2024	Ghost Killer	Kagehara		

=== Television ===
Year	Title	Role	Notes	Ref.
2019	Coffee & Vanilla	Takaaki Akutsu		
2023	Trillion Game	Hiroto	Episode 3	
2024	How to Grill Our Love	Kenta Fukuyama		
