= Musical: Touken Ranbu =

Japanese stage musical series based on the video game Touken Ranbu

- Basis: Touken Ranbu by DMM.com
- Premiere: October 30, 2015: AiiA Theater Tokyo, Tokyo, Japan

Musical: Touken Ranbu (ミュージカル『刀剣乱舞』) is a series of 2.5D stage musicals co-produced by Nelke Planning, DMM.com, and Euclid Agency based on the online browser game Touken Ranbu. The musicals were directed by Isamu Kayano, with screenplay by Chūji Mikasano and choreography by Tetsuhara. The musicals were first announced in 2015 at the same time Stage: Touken Ranbu, a "straight play" adaptation, was announced.

Along with the musical, music from the cast members was released under the name Touken Danshi (刀剣男士) and consecutively topped music charts. Furthermore, Touken Danshi has made several television appearances performing as their respective characters.

== Production history ==
The musical had a trial run from October 30, 2015, to November 8, 2015. The success of the trial run led to the musical's first official show, Atsukashiyama Ibun (阿津賀志山異聞), which ran from May to June 2016. To promote the show, Musical: Touken Ranbu began releasing music performed by the cast members under the collective name Touken Danshi (刀剣男士). The opening number for the play, "Touken Ranbu" (刀剣乱舞), was released as a single on January 1, 2016, performed by the cast members under the name Touken Danshi Team Sanjo with Kashuu Kiyomitsu (刀剣男士 team三条 with加州清光). The ending theme, "Kimi no Uta", was released as a single on July 6, 2016. The cast also performed the songs live on the television show Music Japan.

The second musical, Bakumatsu Tenrōden (幕末天狼傳), ran from September 24, 2016, to November 27, 2016. The musical's ending theme, "Yume Hitotsu", was released as a single on March 29, 2017, and was performed by the cast under the name Touken Danshi Team Shinsengumi with Hachisuka Kotetsu (刀剣男士 team新撰組 with蜂須賀虎徹). Songs from the single took the top 8 on Dwango's Weekly Charts upon release. While on a slight break in between the production of Bakumatsu Tenroden, the cast was invited to perform a one-night only showing commemorating the 20th anniversary of Itsukushima Shrine's UNESCO World Heritage Site Registration called Musical Touken Ranbu in Itsukushima Jinja.

The third musical, Mihotose no Komoriuta (三百年の子守唄), ran from March 4, 2017, to April 23, 2017, and it was also live-streamed in theaters across Hong Kong, Taiwan, Thailand, and Indonesia. The musical also ran in Zhuhai, China, from May 19, 2017, to May 21, 2017. The musical's theme song, "Shōri no Gaika", was released as a single on September 27, 2017, under the name Touken Danshi Formation of Mihotose (刀剣男士 formation of 三百年). The single sold more than 90,000 copies and debuted at #1 on the Oricon Weekly Singles Chart.

The fourth musical, Tsuwamono Domo ga Yume no Ato (つはものどもがゆめのあと), was announced at the final show of Mihotose no Komoriuta. The shows ran from November 4, 2017, to January 30, 2018. The musical's theme song, "Be in Sight", was released as a single on March 16, 2017, and was performed by the cast under the name Touken Danshi Formation of Tsuwamono (刀剣男士 formation of つはもの). The single was bundled with a music video and was released six different versions for both preorder and press editions, one for each of the six featured characters, along with a solo song from either of the six characters depending on the version.

Ryuji Sato, who played Kashuu Kiyomitsu, released his first solo single as the character on December 25, 2017, and held a series of concerts from September 12, 2018, to October 13, 2018. Starting from April 8, 2018, the cast of the musicals had their own radio show, Musical: Touken Ranbu Radio (ミュージカル刀剣乱舞ラジオ), with Hisanori Yoshida as the MC. The radio show was broadcast on Monday evenings on Nippon Broadcasting System.

The fifth musical, Musubi no Hibiki, Hajimari no Ne (結びの響、始まりの音), ran from March 2018 to May 2018.

A re-run of Atsukashiyama Ibun took place at Japonisme 2018 in Paris, France, before returning to Tokyo in August 2018. Ryo Kitazono, who played Kogitsunemaru, was unable to perform on stage in Paris due to surgery for a retinal detachment and played the character in voice only. The stage part of the performance was played by Daisuke Iwasaki, an ensemble member, for their performances upon returning to Japan. During the live concert part of the Japan performances, the spot for Kogitsunemaru was left empty.

In October 2018, the cast of Musical: Touken Ranbu were invited to perform on NHK's Songs of Tokyo, where they performed under the name Touken Danshi Formation of Tokyo. The cast was also invited to perform at the 69th NHK Kōhaku Uta Gassen.

On January 20, 2019, through March 24, 2019, a re-run of the 3rd musical, Mihotose no Komoriuta, occurred, visiting 3 cities for a total of 73 performances. Kashuu Kiyomitsu's solo Tanki Shitsujin which is on its third year will be having its first Asia Tour will start in April 2019 to May 7, 2019, and will visit Shanghai, Bangkok, Macau, and Japan.

From July 4 through 14th, 2019, Higekiri Hizamaru Sōki Shutsujin 2019: Soga (髭切膝丸 双騎出陣 2019~SOGA~) ran for 17 performances at the Shinagawa Prince Hotel Stellar Ball in Tokyo. The musical featured the characters of Higekiri (Hiroki Miura) and Hizamaru (Akira Takano) interpreting the story of Soga in a kabuki-style manner. A re-run of the same play is scheduled to run through from August to October in 2020.

The franchise released its sixth full-scale musical, Kishou Hongi (葵咲本紀), which ran from August 3 through October 27, 2019, touring in 4 cities across Japan for a total of 74 performances.

The franchise released its seventh full-scale musical, Shizuka no Umi no Paraiso (〜静かの海のパライソ〜), which ran from March 21 through May 31, 2020, touring in 4 cities across Japan for a total of 64 performances.

The franchise released its eighth full-scale musical, Tokyo Kokoro Oboe, which ran from through March 7 through May 23, 2021, touring four cities. It was initially intended to tour through Osaka, but all performances were called due to the Coronavirus pandemic.

The franchise released its ninth full-scale musical, Kousui Sanka no Yuki in 2022.

The franchise released its tenth full-scale musical, Hana Kage Yureru Tomizu in 2023.

The franchise released its eleventh full-scale musical, ~Michi no Oku Hitotsu wa Chisu~ in 2024. These performances notably saw the return of Kuroba Mario as Mikazuki Munechika and Sato Ryuji as Kashuu Kiyomitsu to the main stage after a six and four year absence, respectively.

In addition, the franchise has regularly run a year-end series of live performances since 2016, entitled Shinken Ranbu Sai. While less narratively focused than the main installments, these performances function as cast round-ups and feature short stories that set the scene for the event.

The Shinken Ranbusai series was put on hiatus from 2019 to 2021 to make way for performances with similar formats, including Uta Awase Ranbu Kyouran and Kotobuki Ranbu Ongyousai. In the middle of 2022, it would make a brief reappearance that saw it ditch the short story format of previous performances in favor of being a concert all the way through.

In 2019, The franchise changed the name and format of its year-end live performance to Uta Awase Ranbu Kyouran (歌合 乱舞狂乱) which ran through nine cities in Japan between 2019 and 2020.

In 2021, the franchise held a New Years performance titled Kotobuki Ranbu Ongyousai, which commemorated the fifth anniversary of Musical Touken Ranbu and looked back on all of the previous installments in the series. Due to scheduling constraints and the prominence of COVID-19, the event was smaller scale, and was only performed in the Tokyo Garden Theatre from January 9 to January 23, 2021.

In 2023, the franchise held a live titled Suehirogari Ranbu Yagaimatsuri, which commemorated the eighth anniversary of Musical Touken Ranbu. Similar to Kotobuki Ranbu Ongyousai, it is a smaller scale event, with performances held in Yamanashi, Fuji-Q Highland Conifer Forest from September 17 to September 24, 2023.

The franchise announced on January 16, 2020, that it has accumulated a total of 1 million audience members after 4 1/2 years from the start of the production

== Principal cast and characters ==
=== Main cast ===
Character	Atsukashiyama Ibun	Bakumatsu Tenroden	Mihotose no Komoriuta	Tsuwamono Domo ga Yume no Ato	Musubi no Hibiki, Hajimari no Ne	Kishou Hongi	Shizuka no Umi no Paraiso	Tokyo Kokoro Oboe	Kosui Sanka no Yuki	Hanakage Yureru Tomizu	Michi no Oku Hitotsu Hachisu
Mikazuki Munechika	Mario Kuroba	—	—	Mario Kuroba	—	—	—	—	—	—	Mario Kuroba
Kogitsunemaru	Ryo Kitazono	—	—	Ryo Kitazono	—	—	—	—	—	—	—
Ishikirimaru	Tsubasa Sakiyama	—	Tsubasa Sakiyama	—	—	—	—	—	—	—	—
Iwatooshi	Daichi Saeki	—	—	Daichi Saeki	—	—	—	—	—	—	—
Imanotsurugi	Shunya Ohira	—	—	Shunya Ohira	—	—	—	—	—	—	—
Kashuu Kiyomitsu	Ryuji Sato	Ryuji Sato	—	—	—	—	—	—	—	—	Ryuji Sato
Yamatonokami Yasusada	—	Yuki Torigoe	—	—	Yuki Torigoe	—	—	—	—	—	—
Izuminokami Kanesada	—	Shōtarō Arisawa	—	—	Shōtarō Arisawa	—	—	—	Shōtarō Arisawa	—	—
Horikawa Kunihiro	—	Yuuki Ogoe Shōgo Sakamoto (2020 Rerun)	—	—	Shōgo Sakamoto	—	—	—	—	—	—
Hachisuka Kotetsu	—	Kensuke Takahashi	—	—	—	—	—	—	—	—	Kensuke Takahashi
Nagasone Kotetsu	—	Yu Imari	—	—	Yu Imari	—	—	—	—	—	—
Nikkari Aoe	—	—	Hirofumi Araki	—	—	—	—	—	—	—	—
Sengo Muramasa	—	—	Motohiro Ota	—	—	Motohiro Ota	—	—	—	—	—
Tonbokiri	—	—	Spi	—	—	Spi	—	—	—	—	—
Monoyoshi Sadamune	—	—	Ryugi Yokota	—	—	—	—	—	—	—	—
Ookurikara	—	—	Takuma Zaiki Hikaru Makishima (2019 Rerun)	—	—	—	Hikaru Makishima	—	—	—	—
Higekiri	—	—	—	Hiroki Miura	—	—	—	—	—	—	—
Hizamaru	—	—	—	Akira Takano	—	—	—	—	—	—	—
Mutsunokami Yoshiyuki	—	—	—	—	Shin Tamura	—	—	—	—	—	—
Tomoegata Naginata	—	—	—	—	Haruki Kiyama	—	—	—	—	—	—
Akashi Kuniyuki	—	—	—	—	—	Hiroki Nakada	—	—	—	—	—
Tsurumaru Kuninaga	—	—	—	—	—	Kurumu Okamiya	Kurumu Okamiya	—	—	—	Kurumu Okamiya
Otegine	—	—	—	—	—	Ryousei Tanaka	—	—	—	—	—
Kotegiri Gou	—	—	—	—	—	Shogo Tamura	—	—	—	—	—
Buzen Gou	—	—	—	—	—	—	Yuta Tachibana	Yuta Tachibana	—	—	—
Matsui Gou	—	—	—	—	—	—	Hiroki Sasamori	—	—	—	—
Urashima Kotetsu	—	—	—	—	—	—	Yojiro Itokawa	—	—	—	—
Hyuuga Masamune	—	—	—	—	—	Hiroki Ishibashi	—	—	—	—	—
Otenta Mitsuyo	—	—	—	—	—	—	—	Raita	—	—	—
Sohaya no Tsurugi	—	—	—	—	—	—	—	Masaki Nakao	—	—	—
Kuwana Gou	—	—	—	—	—	—	—	Tomoya Fukui	—	—	—
Suishinshi Masahide	—	—	—	—	—	—	—	Seiya Konishi	—	—	Seiya Konishi
Minamoto Kiyomaro	—	—	—	—	—	—	—	Nobunaga Sato	—	—	—
Samidare Gou	—	—	—	—	—	—	—	Shogo Yamazaki	—	—	—
Murakumo Gou	—	—	—	—	—	—	—	Seiichiro Nagata	—	—	—
Ookanehira	—	—	—	—	—	—	—	—	Yunosuke Matsushima	—	Yunosuke Matsushima
Koryu Kagemitsu	—	—	—	—	—	—	—	—	Kohei Nagata	Kohei Nagata	—
Yamabagiri Kunihiro	—	—	—	—	—	—	—	—	Daigo Kato	—	Daigo Kato
Nansen Ichimonji	—	—	—	—	—	—	—	—	Yusuke Takemoto	—	—
Hizen Tadahiro	—	—	—	—	—	—	—	—	Ryoga Ishikawa	—	—
Onimaru Kunitsuna	—	—	—	—	—	—	—	—	—	Mitsuaki Hayashi	—
Ichigo Hitofuri	—	—	—	—	—	—	—	—	—	Naoki Kunishima	—
Daihannya Nagamitsu	—	—	—	—	—	—	—	—	—	Waku Kyouten	—
Heshikiri Hasebe	—	—	—	—	—	—	—	—	—	Rui Kihara	—
Yamambagiri Chogi	—	—	—	—	—	—	—	—	—	Kenta Mizue	—

== Critical reception ==
Justine Mouron from Journal du Japon described the stage design as limited, yet immersive, with praise towards the costume design and energy of the actors. However, due to the lack of change in choreography to make up for Ryo Kitazono's physical absence (who was unable to appear on stage due to a retinal detachment), she pointed out there was a "vacuum" at times.

== Discography ==
=== Soundtrack albums ===
Title	Details	Peak chart positions	Sales
Title	Details	JPN	Sales
Musical: Touken Ranbu: Atsukashiyama Ibun (ミュージカル『刀剣乱舞』〜阿津賀志山異聞〜) (Touken Danshi Team Sanjo with Kashuu Kiyomitsu)	Released: August 10, 2016; Label: Euclid Music Entertainment; Formats: CD	2	
Musical: Touken Ranbu: Bakumatsu Tenrōden (ミュージカル『刀剣乱舞』〜幕末天狼傳〜) (Touken Danshi Team Shinsengumi with Hachisuka Kotetsu)	Released: June 28, 2017; Label: Euclid Music Entertainment; Formats: CD	7	
Musical: Touken Ranbu: Mihotose no Komoriuta (ミュージカル『刀剣乱舞』〜三百年の子守唄〜) (Touken Danshi Formation of Mihotose)	Released: November 8, 2017; Label: Euclid Music Entertainment; Formats: CD	4	
Musical: Touken Ranbu: Tsuwamono Domo ga Yume no Ato (ミュージカル『刀剣乱舞』 ～つはものどもがゆめのあと～) (Touken Danshi Formation of Tsuwamono)	Released: July 25, 2018; Label: Euclid Music Entertainment; Formats: CD	5	
Musical: Touken Ranbu: ～Musubi no Hibiki, Hajimari no Ne ～ (ミュージカル『刀剣乱舞』 ～結びの響、始まりの音～) (Touken Danshi Team Bakumatsu with Tomoegata Naginata)	Released: November 14, 2018; Label: Euclid Music Entertainment; Formats: CD	4	
Musical: Touken Ranbu: Mihotose no Komoriuta 2019 (ミュージカル『刀剣乱舞』〜三百年の子守唄〜 2019) (Touken Danshi Formation of Mihotose)	Released: November 20, 2019; Label: Euclid Music Entertainment; Formats: CD	4	
Musical: Touken Ranbu: HIGEKIRI HIZAMARU DUO PERFORMANCE2019 ～SOGA～ (ミュージカル『刀剣乱舞』 髭切膝丸 双騎出陣2019 〜SOGA〜)(Touken Danshi Higekiri Hizamaru)	Released: March 25, 2020; Label: Euclid Music Entertainment; Formats: CD	3	
Musical: Touken Ranbu: Kishouhongi (ミュージカル『刀剣乱舞』～葵咲本紀～)(Touken Danshi formation of Kishou)	Released: August 26, 2020; Label: Euclid Music Entertainment; Formats: CD	2	
Musical: Touken Ranbu: Tokyo Kokorooboe (ミュージカル『刀剣乱舞』-東京心覚-)(Touken Danshi formation of Kokorooboe)	Released: March 2, 2022; Label: Euclid Music Entertainment; Formats: CD	2	
Musical: Touken Ranbu: Shizuka no Umi no Paraíso (ミュージカル『刀剣乱舞』〜静かの海のパライソ〜)(Touken Danshi Formation of Paraíso)	Released: July 27, 2022; Label: Euclid Music Entertainment; Formats: CD	7	
Musical: Touken Ranbu: Kosui Sanka no Yuki (ミュージカル『刀剣乱舞』〜江水散花雪〜)(Touken Danshi Formation of Kosui sanka no yuki)	Released: March 15, 2023; Label: Euclid Music Entertainment; Formats: CD	2	
Musical: Touken Ranbu: Tsurumaru Kuninaga Ōkurikara Duo Performance ～Shunpu Touri no Sakazuki～ (ミュージカル『刀剣乱舞』鶴丸国永 大倶利伽羅 双騎出陣 ～春風桃李巵～)(Touken Danshi Tsurumaru Kuninaga, Ookurikara)	Released: July 12, 2023; Label: Euclid Music Entertainment; Formats: CD	4	
Viva Carnival (Touken Danshi formation of Gou on stage)	Released: December 11, 2023; Label: Euclid Music Entertainment; Formats: CD	2	Streaming Mini Album

=== Singles ===
Title	Year	Peak chart positions		Sales	Album
Title	Year	JPN		Sales	Album
Title	Year	Oricon Weekly	Hot 100	Sales	Album
"Touken Ranbu" (刀剣乱舞) (Touken Danshi Team Sanjo with Kashuu Kiyomitsu)	2016	2	1	—	Musical: Touken Ranbu: Atsukashiyama Ibun
"Kimi no Uta" (キミの詩) (Touken Danshi Team Sanjo with Kashuu Kiyomitsu)	2016	3	3	—	Musical: Touken Ranbu: Atsukashiyama Ibun
"Yume Hitotsu" (ユメひとつ) (Touken Danshi Team Shinsengumi with Hachisuka Kotetsu)	2017	3	11	—	Musical: Touken Ranbu: Bakumatsu Tenrōden
"Shōri no Gaika" (勝利の凱歌) (Touken Danshi Formation of Mihotose)	2017	1	1	90,000+ (Oricon)	Musical: Touken Ranbu: Mihotose no Komoriuta
"Mitsumete Kureru Nara" (見つめてくれるなら) (Touken Danshi Kashuu Kiyomitsu)	2017	7	20	—	Musical: Touken Ranbu: Kashuu Kiyomitsu Tanki Shutsujin 2017
"Be in Sight" (Touken Danshi Formation of Tsuwamono)	2018	2	2	102,563	Musical: Touken Ranbu: Tsuwamono Domo ga Yume no Ato
"Kessen no Toki" (決戦の鬨) (Touken Danshi team Bakumatsu with Tomoegata Naginata)	2018	2	2	—	Musical: Touken Ranbu: Musubi no Hibiki, Hajimari no Ne
"Promise You" (Touken Danshi Kashuu Kiyomitsu)	2019	14	15	—	Musical: Touken Ranbu: Kashuu Kiyomitsu Tanki Shutsujin 2018
"Kodou" (鼓動) (Touken Danshi Formation of Mihotose)	2019	2	2	85,000+	Musical: Touken Ranbu: Mihotose no Komoriuta 2019
"Lost The Memory" (Touken Danshi team Sanjou with Kashuu Kiyomitsu)	2020	4	4	48,500+	Musical: Touken Ranbu: Atsukashiyama Ibun Paris 2018
"Yakusoku no Sora" (約束の空) (Touken Danshi formation of Kishou)	2020	2	4		Musical: Touken Ranbu: Kishouhongi
"Seijaku no Toushi" (静寂の闘志) (Touken Danshi Higekiri Hizamaru)	2021	4	20		Musical: Touken Ranbu: HIGEKIRI HIZAMARU DUO PERFORMANCE2019 ～SOGA～
"Scarlet Lips" (Touken Danshi Team Shinsengumi with Hachisuka Kotetsu)	2021	2			Musical: Touken Ranbu: Bakumatsu Tenrōden
"Hogiuta" (壽歌) (Touken Danshi Daihensei Kotobuki2021)	2021	4			Musical: Touken Ranbu: The Musical the 5th anniversary "Kotobuki Ranbuongyokusai"
"Towazu Gatari/Honop" (問わず語り / 焔) (Touken Danshi formation of Kokorooboe)	2021	2			Musical: Touken Ranbu: Tokyo Kokorooboe
"Free Style" (Touken Danshi Formation of Paraíso)	2022	3	10		Musical: Touken Ranbu: Shizuka no Umi no Paraíso
"Omae-ga Shitteru" (お前が知ってる) (Touken Danshi Formation of Kosui sanka no yuki)	2022	2	7		Musical: Touken Ranbu: Kosui Sanka no Yuki
"Hajimari no Kaze/Wassa! Wassa!" (始まりの風 / Wassa! Wassa!) (Touken Danshi Daihensei Suehirogari2023)	2024				Musical: Touken Ranbu: Suehirogari Ranbu Yagaimatsuri

== DVD releases ==
Year	Title	Peak chart positions (JPN)		Notes
Year	Title	Blu-ray	DVD	
2016	Musical: Touken Ranbu: trial performance (ミュージカル『刀剣乱舞』トライアル公演)	-	14	
2016	Musical: Touken Ranbu: Atsukashiyama Ibun (ミュージカル『刀剣乱舞』〜阿津賀志山異聞〜)			
2017	Musical: Touken Ranbu: Bakumatsu Tenrōden (ミュージカル『刀剣乱舞』〜幕末天狼傳〜)	4	2	
2017	Musical: Touken Ranbu: Shinkenranbusai 2016 (ミュージカル『刀剣乱舞』 〜真剣乱舞祭2016〜)	7	6	
2017	Musical: Touken Ranbu: Mihotose no Komoriuta (ミュージカル『刀剣乱舞』〜三百年の子守唄〜)	3	2	
2017	Musical: Touken Ranbu: The Musical at Itsukushima Shrine (ミュージカル『刀剣乱舞』 in 嚴島神社)	4	4	
2018	Musical: Touken Ranbu: Kashū Kiyomitsu Solo Performance 2017 (ミュージカル『刀剣乱舞』 加州清光 単騎出陣2017)	5	4	
2018	Musical: Touken Ranbu: Shinkenranbusai 2017 (ミュージカル『刀剣乱舞』 〜真剣乱舞祭2017〜)	3	2	
2018	Musical: Touken Ranbu: Tsuwamono Domo ga Yume no Ato (ミュージカル『刀剣乱舞』 ～つはものどもがゆめのあと～)	3	4	
2018	Musical: Touken Ranbu: ～Musubi no Hibiki, Hajimari no Ne ～ (ミュージカル『刀剣乱舞』 ～結びの響、始まりの音～)	4	1	
2019	Musical: Touken Ranbu: Atsukashiyama Ibun 2018 Paris (ミュージカル『刀剣乱舞』 ～阿津賀志山異聞2018 巴里～)	5	8	
2019	Musical: Touken Ranbu: Kashū Kiyomitsu Solo Performance 2018 (ミュージカル『刀剣乱舞』 加州清光 単騎出陣2018)	20	14	
2019	Musical: Touken Ranbu: Shinkenranbusai 2018 (ミュージカル『刀剣乱舞』 〜真剣乱舞祭2018〜)	2	3	
2019	Musical: Touken Ranbu: Shibuya Note presents Touken Ranbu: The Musical "From 2.5D to the World" (シブヤノオト Presents ミュージカル『刀剣乱舞』-2.5次元から世界へ-＜特別編集版＞)	5	3	
2019	Musical: Touken Ranbu: Mihotose no Komoriuta 2019 (ミュージカル『刀剣乱舞』〜三百年の子守唄〜 2019)	3	3	
2019	Musical: Touken Ranbu: The Musical Kashū Kiyomitsu Solo Performance Asia Tour (ミュージカル『刀剣乱舞』 加州清光 単騎出陣 アジアツアー)	12	11	
2020	Musical: Touken Ranbu: Higekiri Hizamaru Duo Performance 2019 ～Soga～ (ミュージカル『刀剣乱舞』 髭切膝丸 双騎出陣2019 〜SOGA〜)	1	4	
2020	Musical: Touken Ranbu: Kishouhongi (ミュージカル『刀剣乱舞』～葵咲本紀～)	5	2	
2020	Musical: Touken Ranbu: Utaawase Ranbukyouran 2019 (ミュージカル『刀剣乱舞』歌合 乱舞狂乱 2019)	1	3	
2020	Musical: Touken Ranbu: Music Clips 2015–2020 (ミュージカル『刀剣乱舞』 ～MUSIC CLIPS 2015–2020～)	2	2	
2021	Musical: Touken Ranbu: Higekiri Hizamaru Duo Performance 2020 ～Soga～ (ミュージカル『刀剣乱舞』 髭切膝丸 双騎出陣 2020 〜SOGA〜)	4	6	
2021	Musical: Touken Ranbu: Bakumatsu Tenrōden 2020 (ミュージカル『刀剣乱舞』 〜幕末天狼傳2020〜)	3	7	
2021	Musical: Touken Ranbu: the 5th anniversary "Kotobuki Ranbuongyokusai" (ミュージカル『刀剣乱舞』 五周年記念 壽 乱舞音曲祭)	3	1	
2022	Musical: Touken Ranbu: Tokyo Kokorooboe (ミュージカル『刀剣乱舞』-東京心覚-)	2	2	
2022	Musical: Touken Ranbu: Shizuka no Umi no Paraíso (ミュージカル『刀剣乱舞』〜静かの海のパライソ〜)	2	3	
2022	Musical: Touken Ranbu: Kosui sanka no yuki (ミュージカル『刀剣乱舞』〜江水散花雪〜)	2	4	
2023	Musical "Tsurumaru Kuninaga Ōkurikara Duo Performance ～Shunpu Touri no Sakazuki～ (ミュージカル『刀剣乱舞』 鶴丸国永 大倶利伽羅 双騎出陣 ～春風桃李巵～)	5	6	
2023	Musical: Touken Ranbu: Shinkenranbusai2022 (ミュージカル『刀剣乱舞』 ～真剣乱舞祭2022～)	1	2	
2023	Touken Ranbu: The Musical "Nikkari Aoe Solo Performance" (ミュージカル『刀剣乱舞』 にっかり青江 単騎出陣)	1	2	
2023	Touken Ranbu：The Musical "Gou on Stage" New Edition of Satomi Hakkenden (ュージカル『刀剣乱舞』 江 おん すていじ ～新編 里見八犬伝～)	3	3	
2024	Touken Ranbu：The Musical "Hanakage Yureru Tomizu" (ミュージカル『刀剣乱舞』 ～花影ゆれる砥水～)			
