= How to Grill Our Love =

Japanese manga series

- First tankōbon volume cover

焼いてるふたり (Yaiteru Futari)
- Genre: Cooking; Romance; Slice of life
- Manga
- Written by: Shiori Hanatsuka
- Published by: Kodansha
- English publisher: NA: Kodansha USA
- Imprint: Morning KC
- Magazine: Morning
- Original run: September 24, 2020 – July 16, 2026
- Volumes: 25
- Television drama
- Directed by: Hitomi Kitagawa; Atsushi Hirai
- Written by: Nanoha Ito
- Studio: AOI Pro
- Original network: Yomiuri TV, Chukyo TV, SDT, NIB, FBS, KKT, Miyatere
- Original run: July 5, 2024 – September 6, 2024
- Episodes: 10
- icon

How to Grill Our Love (Japanese: 焼いてるふたり, Hepburn: Yaiteru Futari; lit. 'Grilling Couple') is a Japanese manga series written and illustrated by Shiori Hanatsuka. It was serialized in Kodansha's seinen manga magazine Morning from September 2020 to July 2026. A live-action television drama adaptation aired from July to September 2024.

== Characters ==
Kenta Fukuyama (福山健太, Fukuyama Kenta)
Portrayed by: Mario Kuroba
Chihiro Yamaguchi (山口千尋, Yamaguchi Chihiro)
Portrayed by: Sayuri Matsumura

== Media ==
=== Manga ===
Written and illustrated by Shiori Hanatsuka, How to Grill Our Love was serialized in Kodansha's seinen manga magazine Morning from September 24, 2020, to July 16, 2026. The series' chapters have been collected into twenty-five tankōbon volumes as September 2026. The series is licensed digitally in English by Kodansha USA.

No.	Original release date	Original ISBN	North American release date	North American ISBN
1	December 23, 2020	978-4-06-521539-5	May 2, 2023	978-1-68-491813-3
1. "You Know How to Cook to Perfection"; 2. "Our First Breakfast Together"; 3. "Cheers to Beer and Lamb Chops"; 4. "Let's BBQ Date 1"; 5. "Let's BBQ Date 2"; 6. "Feeling Down? Grill Some Steak!"; 7. "Jerk Chicken with Rum and Coke"
2	March 23, 2021	978-4-06-522386-4	June 6, 2023	978-1-68-491814-0
8. "Chilled Demeanor with a Side of Light Gyoza"; 9. "Home BBQ to Cheer On My Wife"; 10. "Dizzying Night for Two"; 11. "Steamy Rice in a Mess Tin"; 12. "Fire-Starter Challenge!"; 13. "Fascinating Hunk of Meat"; 14. "Porch Picnic on a Sleepless Night"; 15. "First Couple's Quarrel"; 16. "Acqua Pazza and a Hug as a Reward"; Bonus: The Fukuyama Family Secret
3	June 23, 2021	978-4-06-523487-7	July 4, 2023	978-1-68-491815-7
17. "What Body Part Is That?"; 18. "Father Incoming"; 19. "Hot Sandwich with Convenient Side Dishes"; 20. "Romantic Home Theater"; 21. "Best Day Off ft. Spiral Sausage"; 22. "A Midsummer Curry Comeback"; 23. "Unagi Bento Heaped with Love"; 24. "Summer's Here! Riverside BBQ 1"; 25. Summer's Here! Riverside BBQ 2"
4	September 22, 2021	978-4-06-524558-3	September 5, 2023	978-1-68-491816-4
26. "Love on Fire"; 27. "A Little Space for the Married Couple"; 28. "Cup Sake and a Fresh Catch"; 29. "Roast Beef and Surprises"; 30. "Farewell Party BBQ 1"; 31. "Farewell Party BBQ 2"; 32. "How We Met"; 33. "Comforting Flavors, Cherry Blossoom Rice"; 34. "Beef Tongue and Lemon Sours"
5	December 23, 2021	978-4-06-526256-6	November 7, 2023	978-1-68-491817-1
35. "Almighty Beef! Charcoal-Grilled Burgers"; 36. "A Nice Evening Breeze and Summer Festival at Home"; 37. "A Power Salad for When You're Feeling Powerless"; 38. "Cornered with a Mackerel Sandwich"; 39. "Bike Ride to Zero Calories"; 40. "Life Hacks and Foil Wraps"; 41. "Samgyeopsal on Nights Fit for Crying"; 42. "Craft Cola and Homemade Love"; 43. "Fall Fashion and Grilled Saury"
6	March 23, 2022	978-4-06-526996-1	January 2, 2024	978-1-68-491818-8
44. "Drinking at Home and Smokin'!"; 45. "Welcome, Neighbor!"; 46. "Skewer the Meat and Gril!"; 47. "Tired? Time to Bake a Pizza!"; 48. "Gossip! At the Imoni Party"; 49. "Cutting the Wedding Cake... for Practice!"; 50. "Charge Up with Garlic Power!"; 51. "Cheese Fondue Melts the Worries Away"; 52. "The Fukuyama Ladies Get Their Fill of Nasu!"
7	June 22, 2022	978-4-06-528053-9	March 5, 2024	978-1-68-491819-5
53. "What I Could Never Tell You"; 54. "Family Reunion Over Steak Cubes!"; 55. "Duck Hot Pot with a Shy Chihiro-san!"; 56. "Enjoying Oden & Beer in the Kotatsu!"; 57. "Serious Romantic Advice for Rina-chan!"; 58. "Be Brave with Taiyaki and Say No!"; 59. "Savoring the Seasons with You!"; 60. "A Sudden Age-Gap Love Story?!"; 61. "A Huge Blunder Just before Christmas!"
8	September 22, 2022	978-4-06-529019-4	May 7, 2024	978-1-68-491820-1
62. "Sharing Our Feelings This White Christmas"; 63. "Say Goodbye to Earthly Desires With a Stoic Japanese Meal!"; 64. "New Year's Eve With Sukiyaki!"; 65. "Ozoni to Ring in the New Year!"; 66. "Dab the Short Ribs at Our Special Restaurant!"; 67. "Pizza Toast to Mellow Out!"; 68. "Drowning Your Sorrows With a Side of Pepperoncini Edamame"; 69. "Bumping Into Dad's Special Someone!"; 70. "We Cooked Her Dream Nordic Dish"
9	December 22, 2022	978-4-06-530009-1	July 2, 2024	979-8-88-933454-5
71. "Our First Camping Trip Part 1"; 72. "Our First Camping Trip Part 2"; 73. "The Ring's Whereabouts"; 74. "Decadent Flan Parfait for One"; 75. "The Usual Saturday Lunch"; 76. "Sofa of Happiness"; 77. "Packed with Love! Ginger-fried Pork"; 78. "Celebrating a Promotion with Tomahawk Steaks!"; 79. "Summer Food Report with Roasted Broad Beans"
10	March 23, 2023	978-4-06-530860-8	September 3, 2024	979-8-88-933462-0
80. "The New Transplant & Yakisoba Egg Sandwiches"; 81. "Taco Fiesta Wrap Party!"; 82. "Whorls and Peaks! A Hearty Nikuman Treat"; 83. "Steamed Oysters on the Beach!"; 84. "Homemade Thai Food with Home-Grown Cilantro!"; 85. "Jazzing Up Nikujaga Leftovers on a Stormy Night"; 86. "Crisis Cuisine: One-Pan Steak & Rice"; 87. "A Meaty Birthday Party"; 88. "Sandwich Trifecta & a Surprise"
11	June 22, 2023	978-4-06-531823-2	November 5, 2024	979-8-88-933463-7
89. "A Taste of Autumn in a Foil Packet Salisbury Steak"; 90. "My First Monjayaki"; 91. "Easy Peasy Three-Color Namul"; 92. "The Joy of Effort! Salt-Crusted Sea Bream"; 93. "An Adventurous Wild Game Experience!"; 94. "Easy Afternoon Tea at Home"; 95. "Guilt—Free Chicken Piccata"; 96. "Melty Napa Cabbage & Lion's Head Meatballs"; 97. "I Can Do It Myself! French Toast"
12	September 22, 2023	978-4-06-532838-5	January 7, 2025	979-8-88-933645-7
98. "Warm Cream Stew for Two"; 99. "Hooked on Homemade Pork Belly Ramen"; 100. "Ice-Cold Beer and Laziji"; 101. "Bubbles at Home! Simmered Beef Tendon"; 102. "Fussy About Dashi: A Rice Balls & Miso Soup Story"; 103. "Fresh Fried Skewers to Enjoy with Baseball"; 104. "Cherry Blossom Viewing and Tricolor Dango!"; 105. "Bamboo Shoot Bliss to Start the New Year!"; 106. "Springtime Peperoncino with Firefly Squid"
13	December 21, 2023	978-4-06-533775-2	March 4, 2025	979-8-88-933650-1
107. "Bacon & Eggs for Those Off Days!"; 108. "Finger Food Feast for the Show"; 109. "Retirement Prep: Meat-Wrapped French Fries"; 110. "Rainy Day Refreshment: Tofu Bowl"; 111. "Perfect Pairing: Coffee and Donuts"; 112. "More Adventurous Eating: Lamb Biryani"; 113. "Late-Night Udon Soup Porridge"; 114. "Takiya Fishing Fun and Dreamy Banquets"; 115. "Potluck Hors d'Oeuvres Banquet!"
14	March 22, 2024	978-4-06-534921-2	May 27, 2025	979-8-89-478278-2
116. "Summer Scaries! Cold Pork Shabu with Grated Daikon"; 117. "Clam Bliss: An Adult Summer Vacation"; 118. "Errands and Pan-fried Summer Veggies"; 119. "Glow Up with Summery Tomato Curry"; 120. "Budget-Friendly Seafood Sausage Fried Rice"; 121. "Cheese Dak-galbi on the Night We Crossed Paths"; 122. "Slowly Recover with Smoked Salmon"; 123. "Home Roasting for Coffee Lovers"; 124. "Warm Sweet Potato Soup for Gloomy Days"
15	June 21, 2024	978-4-06-535775-0	July 1, 2025	979-8-89-478279-9
125. "Here Comes Fall! Braided Apple Pie"; 126. "Dead Set! Autumn Nori Bento Showdown!"; 127. "Good Spouses and Steamed Egg Custard"; 128. "Tidy and Tasty: Mixed Kettle Rice"; 129. "Adulting: Marinated Yakiniku Three Ways"; 130. "Potato Salad Squabble at the Izakaya"; 131. "Good Luck Means Fancy Beef Stew"; 132. "An Edo New Year: Shrimp Tempura Soba"; 133. "New Year's Ratatouille and a New Fetish"
16	July 23, 2024	978-4-06-535983-9	September 2, 2025	979-8-89-478280-5
134. "Spicy Keema Curry, Perfect with Coffee"; 135. "Take It Slow with Simmered Yellowtail & Daikon"; 136. "Longing for Chocolate Brownies"; 137. "A Farewell Wrapped in Cabbage Rolls"; 138. "Rare Scallop Cutlets & English Conversation"; 139. "A Cookie Tin for White Day"; 140. "Beef Bowls for Adulting Survival"; 141. "Bruschetta to Welcome Newcomers"; 142. "Office Hunting & Hiroshima-Style Okonomiyaki"
17	September 20, 2024	978-4-06-536729-2	November 4, 2025	979-8-89-478281-2
143. "Grand Opening Bash! Invitation to a Full-Course Feast!"; 144. "Pork Belly Rice Balls with a Side of Baseball!"; 145. "Veggie Steamers with a Side of Baseball!"; 146. "Seared Bonito on a Statement Dish"; 147. "Newbie Welcome, Crêpe Party Style"; 148. "Slightly Snazzy Meatballs"; 149. "Goodbye, Night Owl. Hello, Savory Soy Breakfast!"; 150. "Corn Dogs at the Secret Club"; 151. "All You Can Eat: Heaping Helpings of Namero"
18	December 23, 2024	978-4-06-537668-3	January 6, 2026	979-8-89-478544-8
152. "Midsummer Jumbo Shrimp Shumai"; 153. "A Man and a Pan: Pork Kimchi!"; 154. "Two Peas in a Pod: Corn Rice for Two"; 155. "A Grown-Up Day Off: Crispy Potato Galette"; 156. "Back to the Beer Garden!"; 157. "Entertainment with Omurice!"; 158. "Farewell to Summer with Takosen"; 159. "Dutch Baby for a Bratty Teen"; 160. "Poke Bowls for a Better Booty!"
19	March 21, 2025	978-4-06-538636-1	March 3, 2026	979-8-89-478662-9
161. "Roast Pork That Brings Fall to the Table"; 162. "Growing Up, One Peperoncino at a Time"; 163. "Travel the World at Home: A British Breakfast Adventure!"; 164. "Fried Pacific Saury and a Side of Sulk"; 165. "The Taste of Love: A Gratin Not Forgotten"; 166. "Consumed by Cravings of Momiji Oroshi"; 167. "An Everlasting Bond and Potato Chips"; 168. "Holding Out for Beef Cutlets!"; 169. "Winter Bread Part 1: Bacon Épi"
20	June 23, 2025	978-4-06-539614-8	May 5, 2026	979-8-89-478676-6
170. "Winter Bread Part 2: Pretzels"; 171. "Winter Bread Part 3: Carrot Cake"; 172. "Get Happy with Lucky Pot Pie"; 173. "Beating a Cold with Nabeyaki Udon!"; 174. "Welcome Good Fortune! Authentic Ehomaki"; 175. "Steak with Chocolate Sauce to Show Support"; 176. "Till We Meet Again: A Farewell Hot Pot"; 177. "Redo Keema Curry Onigiri"; 178. "Amibtion Served with Yellowtail Shabu"
21	September 22, 2025	978-4-06-540530-7	July 7, 2026	979-8-89-478846-3
179. "Enjoying Life with a New Knife and Delicious Sashimi!"; 180. "Heart-to-Heart over Noppe Soup"; 181. "Doubting, Stressing, and Hometown Bites"; 182. "A Half-Portion Saucy Katsu Bowel"; 183. "Wappa Meshi to End the Trip!"; 184. "Mother's Day and a Kids' Meal"; 185. "Steamy Glasses: Blowing on Miso Ramen"; 186. "Cleansing Plum Soup and Supportive Songs"; 187. "Dig In! A Manly Chicken Nanban"
22	December 23, 2025	978-4-06-541615-0	October 6, 2026	979-8-89-830121-7
188. "A Rainy-Day Tragedy & Crispy Spring Rolls"; 189. "Curbing Cattiness with Chicken Curry"; 190. "Sorting Memories with Tomato & Egg Stir-Fry"; 191. "Cajun Seafood and a Taste of Regret"; 192. "Learning Elegance Through Grilled Eel Rice"; 193. "The Great Makeover: Japanese-Style Salad Bowl"; 194. "Childish Fun and Mug Cakes"; 195. "Chatting Over the Shoulder! Heart-Pounding Street-Style Chinese"; 196. "A Midsummer Adventure & Bitter Melon Stir-Fry"
23	March 23, 2026	978-4-06-542670-8	—	—
24	June 23, 2026	978-4-06-543656-1	—	—
25	September 18, 2026	978-4-06-544672-0	—	—

=== Drama ===
A live-action television drama adaptation was announced in the fourteenth volume of the manga released on March 22, 2024. The series is produced by AOI Pro and directed by Hitomi Kitagawa and Atsushi Hirai, with scripts written by Nanoha Ito. It aired from July 5 to September 6, 2024, on Yomiuri TV and other networks.

== Reception ==
The series was nominated for the seventh Next Manga Awards in 2021 in the print category.

By March 2024, the series had over 1 million copies in circulation.
