= Star of Guidance =

Novel series by Issui Ogawa

- The cover of the first novel, Earth Awakening.

導きの星 (Michibiki no Hoshi)
- Genre: Science fiction
- Novel series
- Written by: Issui Ogawa
- Illustrated by: Range Murata
- Published by: Kadokawa
- Imprint: Kadokawa Haruki
- Original run: January 16, 2002 – November 15, 2003
- Volumes: 4
- Anime
- Released: Fall 2018 – scheduled

Star of Guidance (Japanese: 導きの星, Hepburn: Michibiki no Hoshi) is a Japanese science fiction novel series written by Issui Ogawa and illustrated by Range Murata. Four novels were published under Kadokawa's Kadokawa Haruki imprint between January 2002 and November 2003. An anime adaptation has been announced for fall 2018.

== Volumes ==
No.	Title	Japanese release date	Japanese ISBN
1	Earth Awakening; Mezame no Daichi (目覚めの大地)	January 16, 2002	978-4-89456-943-0
2	Horizon of Conflict; Arasoi no Chihei (争いの地平)	July 16, 2002	978-4-89456-125-0
3	Sky of Calamity; Wazawai no Sora (災いの空)	February 25, 2003	978-4-7584-3026-5
4	Galaxy of Encounters; Deai no Ginga (出会いの銀河)	November 15, 2003	978-4-7584-3079-1
