= Hotarumaru =

Japanese sword

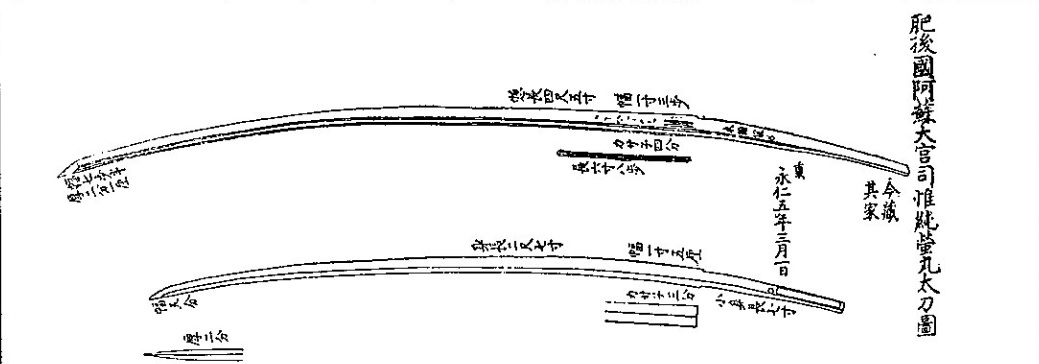
A drawing of Hotarumaru from Shūko Jisshu (『集古十種』)

Hotarumaru (蛍丸; "Firefly") is an ōdachi (Japanese huge greatsword) forged by the swordsmith Rai Kunitoshi (来国俊) and an Important Cultural Property of Japan.

== History ==
The name came from a legend that one night flaws on the blade were repaired by fireflies. The ōdachi is also known as Aso no Hotarumaru (阿蘇の蛍丸) since it was kept as a treasure of the Aso Shrine.

The ōdachi was designated an Important Cultural Property of Japan (then-National Treasure) on December 14, 1931. Since the end of World War II, however, it has been missing.

In 2015, Touken Ranbu fans raised ¥45 million through crowdfunding to construct a replica of the Hotarumaru. During the reconstruction, the Aso Shrine was destroyed from an earthquake in April 2016. A ceremony for the completion of the replica was held on August 27, 2016, and it is now displayed at the Aso Shrine.

== Bibliography ==
- 柴田, 光男; 大河内, 常平 (2005), 趣味の日本刀, 雄山閣出版, ISBN 4-639-01881-9
