= Motohiro Ota =

Japanese actor and voice actor

- 太田 基裕
- Born: January 19, 1987 (age 39); Tokyo, Japan
- Occupations: Actor; voice actor
- Years active: 2005–present
- Agent: Avance
- Height: 178 cm (5 ft 10 in)
- Website: Motohiro Ota Official Site

Motohiro Ota (太田 基裕, Ōta Motohiro; born January 19, 1987) is a Japanese actor and voice actor associated with Avance.

== Filmography ==
=== Films ===
Year	Title	Role	Notes
2014	Magic Night	Nachi	Supporting role

=== Theatre ===
Year	Title	Role	Notes
2009	Musical: The Prince of Tennis	Shinji Ibu	Supporting role
2012	VisuaLive Persona 4	Kou Ichijo	Supporting role
2013	Yowamushi Pedal	Shunsuke Imaizumi	—
2014	Bakumatsu Rock	Shinsaku Takasugi	Lead role
2015	Yowamushi Pedal: Inter-high-hen: The Winner	Shunsuke Imaizumi	
2015	Gyakuten Saiban 2: Saraba Gyakuten	Shingō Ōtorō	
2017	Musical: Touken Ranbu: Mihotose no Komoriuta	Sengo Muramasa	
2017	Kuroko no Basuke OVER-DRIVE	Makoto Hanamiya	
2021	xxxHolic	Yuko Ichihara	
2022	Jujutsu Kaisen	Mahito	
2025	Dance of the Vampires	Alfred	

=== Television ===
Year	Title	Role	Network	Notes
2018	School Babysitters	Chūkichi Nezu	Tokyo MX	Voice in anime; supporting role
