= Attack on Titan: The Musical =

2023 musical

- Official poster
- Music: KEN the 390
- Book: Masafumi Hata
- Basis: Attack on Titan
- Premiere: 7 January 2023: Orix Theatre, Osaka
- Productions: 2023 Osaka; 2023 Tokyo; 2024 New York

Attack on Titan: The Musical is a 2023 musical theatre adaptation of the manga and anime series of the same name. The script is written by Masafumi Hata, based on a story by Hajime Isayama, with music by KEN the 390. Gō Ueki is slated to be the director of the production.

The Japanese-language musical premiered at the Orix Theater in Osaka, Japan on January 7, 2023 before moving to Tokyo. Internationally, it was performed in Japanese with English subtitles at the New York City Center in Midtown Manhattan, New York from 11 to 13 October 2024.

== Development ==
An Attack on Titan stage show was originally developed around 2016. It was announced in the release of Volume 21 of the manga. However, during rehearsals, acrobat Kazutaka Yoshino was injured while testing the ODM gear mechanics. He later died in the hospital, causing the play to be cancelled. In 2022, it was announced that a new musical would be brought to the stage. A poster and trailer were both released on September 5. Reception was mostly positive, although there were some who noted that they hoped the production would be more careful.

Attack on Titan creator Hajime Isayama noted that he had initial worries about the production because of the accident, but stated that he felt like the new company would be much more careful and that he was looking forward to the production. A key visual was released on October 21, with photos of the individual characters released as well.

== Synopsis ==
100 years ago, man-eating giants known as Titans decimated humanity. The survivors built three walls to ensure their survival, until one day, they are reminded that they are trapped in a birdcage. A young Eren Yeager swears to destroy all of the Titans.

The musical covers material roughly up through the end of the "Struggle for Trost" arc, ending at about chapter 11 or 12 in the manga or episode 10 of the anime.

== Cast and characters ==
Character	Osaka	Tokyo	New York
Character	2023		2024
Eren Yeager	Kurumu Okamiya	Kurumu Okamiya	Kurumu Okamiya
Mikasa Ackerman	Sara Takatsuki	Sara Takatsuki	Sara Takatsuki
Armin Arlert	Eito Konishi	Eito Konishi	Eito Konishi
Levi	Ryo Matsuda	Ryo Matsuda	Ryo Matsuda
Jean Kirstein	Yū Fukuzawa	Yū Fukuzawa	Shota Matsuda
Marco Bott	Yasue Kazuaki	Yasue Kazuaki	Yasue Kazuaki
Connie Springer	Tomoya Nakanishi	Tomoya Nakanishi	Yūri Takahashi
Sasha Braus	Sena	Sena	Sena
Hannes	Mitsu Murata	Mitsu Murata	Mitsu Murata
Keith Shadis	Takeshi Hayashino	Takeshi Hayashino	Takeshi Hayashino
Dimo Reeves	Masanori Tomita	Masanori Tomita	Masanori Tomita
Carla Jaeger	Mimi Maihane	Mimi Maihane	Mimi Maihane
Grisha Jaeger	Mitsuru Karahashi	Mitsuru Karahashi	Mitsuru Karahashi
Hange Zoe	Riona Tatemichi	Riona Tatemichi	Riona Tatemichi
Erwin Smith	Takurō Ōno	Takurō Ōno	Takurō Ōno

== Productions ==
The show debuted in the Orix Theater in Osaka from 7 to 9 January 2023, before moving to Nippon Seinenkan Hall in Tokyo from 14 to 24 January. The play was performed internationally at the New York City Center from 11 to 13 October 2024, with the cast and staff returning to reprise their roles. The musical was performed in Japanese with English subtitles.
