= Attack on Titan: Harsh Mistress of the City =

Japanese light novel series written by Ryō Kawakami

- The cover of the first volume of Attack on Titan: Harsh Mistress of the City

進撃の巨人 隔絶都市の女王 (Shingeki no Kyojin: Kakuzetsu Toshi no Joō)
- Light novel
- Written by: Ryō Kawakami
- Illustrated by: Range Murata
- Published by: Kodansha
- English publisher: NA: Vertical
- Imprint: Kodansha Ranobe Bunko
- Original run: August 1, 2014 – May 1, 2015
- Volumes: 2

Attack on Titan: Harsh Mistress of the City (進撃の巨人 隔絶都市の女王, Shingeki no Kyojin: Kakuzetsu Toshi no Joō) is a Japanese light novel series written by Ryō Kawakami and illustrated by Range Murata, based on the manga Attack on Titan (進撃の巨人, Shingeki no Kyojin) by Hajime Isayama. The series is published by Kodansha in Japan and by Vertical in North America.

== Plot ==
The story follows Rita Iglehaut (リタ, Rita), a 15-year-old member of the Garrison Regiment, and her childhood friend, Mathias Kramer (マティアス, Matiasu), the son of wealthy merchants, as their home, Quinta District (クィンタ区, Kuinta Ku), comes under siege after the breaching of Wall Maria.

== Release ==
The novel was announced in the 33rd issue of Kodansha's Weekly Shōnen Magazine on July 16, 2014. The books are written by Ryō Kawakami and illustrated by Range Murata. Kodansha published the first volume on August 1, 2014. and the second and last on May 1, 2015.

North American publisher Vertical announced their license to the series at their New York Comic Con panel on October 11, 2014 and published both volumes in 2015.

No.	Title	Original release date	English release date
1	Attack on Titan: The Harsh Mistress of the City, Part 1 Shingeki no Kyojin: Kakuzetsu Toshi no Joō (Ue) (進撃の巨人 隔絶都市の女王（上）)	August 1, 2014; 978-4-06-375296-0	August 25, 2015; 978-1-941220-62-7
2	Attack on Titan: The Harsh Mistress of the City, Part 2 Shingeki no Kyojin: Kakuzetsu Toshi no Joō (Shita) (進撃の巨人 隔絶都市の女王（下）)	May 1, 2015; 978-4-06-375299-1	September 29, 2015; 978-1-942993-29-2

== Reception ==
Rebecca Silverman of Anime News Network gave the first volume a grade of B+, calling it "easily the most readable Attack on Titan novel to come out in English". She noted that Mathias and Rita were believable characters, but expressed a wish to see more of Rita, feeling that her story was more compelling. She concluded by writing that the series was an easy, enjoyable read, and was more likely to appeal to a broader audience than previous novels in the franchise.
