= Kurumu Okamiya =

Japanese actor (born 1998)

- 岡宮 来夢
- Born: April 23, 1998 (age 28); Nagano Prefecture, Japan
- Occupation: Actor
- Years active: 2016–present
- Height: 174 cm (5 ft 9 in)
- Website: https://okamiyakurumu.com/

Kurumu Okamiya (岡宮 来夢, Okamiya Kurumu; born April 23, 1998) is a Japanese stage actor from Nagano, Nagano Prefecture.

== Biography ==
Okamiya was born in Nagano, Nagano Prefecture in 1998.

== Career ==
Okamiya won second place in the 28th Junon Superboy Contest in 2015.

In 2017, he joined the all-male theatrical troupe Aoyama Omotesandou X, which he would leave in 2020. He made his major acting debut in 2019 as Tsurumaru Kuninaga in the Touken Ranbu musical series, which he still continues playing.

In 2023, Okamiya starred as Eren Yeager in the musical adaptation of Attack on Titan and reprised his role in the 2024–5 rerun, which included 3 shows abroad at the New York City Center from 11 to 13 October 2024.

== Filmography ==
=== Theater ===
==== Japanese original works ====
- SHIRO TORA〜beyond the time〜 (2018)
- Musical: Touken Ranbu as Tsurumaru Kuninaga
  - Kishou Hongi (2019)
  - Utaawase Ranbukyouran 2019 (2019)
  - Shizuka no Umi no Paraíso (2020; Partially cancelled due to COVID-19)
  - 5th Anniversary Kotobuki Ranbuongyokusai (2021)
  - Shizuka no Umi no Paraíso 2021 (2021)
  - Shinkenranbusai 2022 (2022)
  - TSURUMARU KUNINAGA OOKURIKARA DUO PERFORMANCE ～Shunpu Touri no Sakazuki～ (2022)
  - Suehirogari Ranbu Yagaimatsuri (2023)
  - Michinooku Hitotsuhachisu (2024)
  - 10th Anniversary Shukugasai “Medetaya Utanohomare Hananomai" (2025)
- 5 Guys Shakespeare Act1: [HAMLET] (2021) as Hamlet
- BANANA FISH the Stage as Eiji Okumura
  - First half (2021)
  - Second half (2022; Partially cancelled due to COVID-19)
- Crest of the Royal Family: the Musical (2021) as Ruka
- Blue Period the Stage (2022) as Yatora Yaguchi
- Attack on Titan: The Musical as Eren Yeager
  - First run (2023)
  - Rerun, including 3 shows abroad at New York City Center (2024–5)
- SPY×FAMILY: the Musical (2023) as Yuri Briar
- The Garden of Words (2023) as Takao Akizuki
- BOOK OPERA Kurumu Fairy Tales: Kerinatsusu Nanahikime no Koyagi (2023)
- Reading Musical: Mike-Neko Holmes (2025) as Yoshitarou Katayama
- Your Lie in April: the Musical (2025) as Kōsei Arima
- ISSA in Paris: the Musical (2026) as Young Kobayashi Issa
- Hoshikage no Hito -Okita Souji: Maboroshi no Seishun- (2026) as Okita Sōji

==== Japanese productions of European and American works ====
- You're a Good Man, Charlie Brown (2021) as Linus
- The Fantasticks (2022) as Matt
- Roméo et Juliette (2024) as Romeo
- 1789: Les Amants de la Bastille (2025) as Ronan Mazurier
