= Power Instinct =

- Logo from the SNES version of the first Power Instinct
- Genre: Fighting game
- Developers: Atlus (1993-2012); Noise Factory (2003-2012)
- Publisher: Atlus (1993-2012)
- Platforms: Arcade, PlayStation, PlayStation 2, Super NES, Genesis, Sega Saturn, Neo Geo
- First release: Power Instinct/Gouketsuji Ichizoku; November 1993
- Latest release: Gōketsuji Ichizoku: Matsuri Senzo Kuyō; August 2009

Power Instinct, released in Japan as Gōketsuji Ichizoku (豪血寺一族; "Gōketsuji Family"), is a fighting video game series created by Atlus.

The series is known for its absurd humor. Unique to the series was the introduction of the transformation feature: several of the characters can change their appearance and fighting style by simply executing certain moves (usually a throwing move), though this has not been featured in every entry in the series. Other features include the ability for every character to perform a double jump, run, and attack while running.

== Characters ==
- (Italy) Angela Belti (アンジェラ・ベルテ) – Angela is an Italian strongwoman. Although she has a very rough lifestyle and a love for heavy metal music, Angela Belti is very passionate and tends to fall in love easily. She is very tall, and very strong, even stronger than most men and as revealed in her ending, quite a bon vivant woman.
- Annie Hamilton (アニー・ハミルトン) – Born in the country of England, Annie Hamilton is a calm and compassionate woman born within a rich family. She is at times overbearing and bossy, due to her spoiled upbringing. However she loves animals, and currently has six dogs, four cats, three horses and a turtle named Kensington.
- (United States) Keith Wayne (キース・ウェイン) – Keith is a playboy who likes to flirt with women, which is one of the reasons that he enters the Gōketsuji tournament. Eventually, he met Annie Hamilton, who became the love of his life and since then, he has been determined to prove that he's the right guy for her.
- (Japan) Otane Gōketsuji (豪血寺お種, Gōketsuji Otane) – As a child, Otane was constantly berated and abused by her older sister, Oume, and was neglected by her own mother, Oshima, due to her unwillingness to fight back. After many years of facing Oume's abuse, Otane decided to leave home at the age of 15 with only one thing on mind: train endlessly so that one day, she could beat Oume and prove that she is a worthy leader of the Gōketsuji clan.
- (Japan) Oume Gōketsuji (豪血寺お梅, Gōketsuji Oume) – Oume, like her younger sister Otane, is a superhuman. To master her mysterious attacks, she confined herself to the mountains. Moreover, she has an eerie and unearthly presence about her and it is rumored that she can turn her opponents to stone just by gazing into their eyes.
- (Japan) Reiji Oyama (大山礼児, Ōyama Reiji) – Reiji is a very straightforward and honest Japanese fighter and is the ultimate training fanatic. He does not do well with minute details, but excels at physical strength matches. He works part-time for a construction company to exert his excess energy. He is somewhat a parody of Ryu from Street Fighter and many other karate warriors like Ryo Sakazaki and Robert Garcia from Art of Fighting.
- (Japan) Saizo Hattori (破鳥才蔵, Hattori Saizō) – Saizo is a dark ninja who keeps his emotions hidden. He normally hides behind a ninja mask to avoid the contact with others, although on some occasions, his part-time job requires him to appear on stage in an animal costume.
- (China) Thin Nen (陳念, Chin Nen) – Thin Nen is a violent Shaolin monk with obscene desires. This religious man studied ancient rituals to gain mystic powers and will do everything to get what he wants, whether it be women, food or money.
- (United States) White Buffalo (ホワイト・バッファロー) – White Buffalo is a Native American who tries to protect the rights of his people at all costs. A man of few words, he appreciates the little things in life.

== Games ==
=== Power Instinct ===
Power Instinct
- Developer: Atlus
- Publisher: Atlus
- Platforms: Arcade, Super NES, Genesis
- Release: November 1993
- Genre: Fighting game
- Mode: Up to 2 players simultaneously

Released in Japan as Gōketsuji Ichizoku (豪血寺一族), the first game of the series was released in 1993. In it, players play as a member of the Gōketsuji clan, who are battling to determine who will replace 78-year-old Oume Gōketsuji as head of the clan. It has eight selectable characters and one unplayable boss character, Oume Gōketsuji, a palette-swap of her younger sister Otane. Originally, every character had a specific win quote for each defeated foe, but that was reduced to only one win quote for each character in the English version.

This game was ported to the Super NES and the Sega Mega Drive. The Super NES version includes some new play modes: Vs. Battle, Practice Mode, Time Attack and a "Life Attack" that consists of defeating as many opponents as possible with just one life bar (similar to the Survival Modes seen in other fighting games).

The Mega Drive version, which was never released outside of Japan, has a Battle Royal mode where 1 or 2 players can select a team, with an option to hide the characters being chosen so they are not revealed until the fight. Additionally, it features an option that allows the strength of each special attack of every playable character to be adjusted to the player's liking.

The English console version of this game, which was only released in North America, had several omitted features, such as Karaoke Mode with the lyrics for the songs "Tatanka no Uta" and "Otoko no Karatemichi", character biographies that pop up in between demos, the intro demo to the game and the scene of Oume where she speaks to the player before she fights them (which changes if she's fighting Otane). The North American Super NES version also replaces the endings that were in the Japanese Super Famicom version with a congratulations screen with the character portraits used in the pre-fight screen.

==== Reception ====
In Japan, Game Machine listed Power Instinct as the most successful table arcade unit of December 1993. Reviewing the Super NES version, GamePro judged that "Power Instinct falls along the lines of Fatal Fury, but it falls short." They praised the double jumps and special moves, but criticized the "passable" graphics and sound and the fact that the boss is just a palette swap of a playable character. A reviewer for Next Generation said the game has "average graphics, decent play control, and moves you've mostly seen before. ... Nothing wrong here, it's just typical." He gave the Super NES version two out of five stars.

=== Power Instinct 2 ===
Power Instinct 2
- Developer: Atlus
- Publisher: Atlus
- Designers: Super-K! Markey; Helen
- Platforms: Arcade, PlayStation
- Release: April 1994
- Genre: Fighting game
- Mode: Up to 2 players simultaneously
- Arcade system: Atlus 68000

Released in Japan as Gōketsuji Ichizoku 2 (豪血寺一族2), Power Instinct 2 features five new characters, giving a total of 13 playable characters and one unplayable boss (Otane Gōketsuji). The game's story picks off from the last game, with Otane having defeated her sister Oume in the previous tournament. However, with the help of their mother Oshima Gōketsuji, Oume kidnapped her sister, threw her into the ocean, and forged a letter saying that Otane has quit as leader, resulting in a new tournament. Otane does escape and fights the winner of the tournament in a bid to defend her leadership of the Gōketsuji clan.

The game introduces the "Stress" meter into the series, which increases when one's attacks are blocked or when attacked. A super attack can be executed when it is full. In addition, when the Stress meter fills up, a character becomes engulfed in a flame of their own energy for a brief moment, which protects from any incoming attacks from the opponent and knocks them away if they are too close.

The PlayStation version, retitled Gouketsuji Ichizoku 2: Chottodake Saikyou Densetsu (豪血寺一族2 ちょっとだけ最強伝説), was only released in Japan. As the subtitle might indicate, it shares some characteristics from Gogetsuji Legends (described below), like the team battle and the possibility to play as Chuck and Kuroko, but these features are only available for Versus (player vs. player) mode. Unlike the arcade game, anytime a transformable character changed into his or her alternate version in the PlayStation port, there was considerable loading time that interrupted the match.

==== Reception ====
In Japan, Game Machine listed Power Instinct 2 as the third most successful table arcade unit of October 1994. On release, Famicom Tsūshin scored the PlayStation version of the game a 23 out of 40.

=== Gogetsuji Legends ===
Gogetsuji Legends
- Developer: Atlus
- Publisher: Atlus
- Platform: Arcade
- Release: June 20, 1995
- Genre: Fighting game
- Mode: Up to 2 players simultaneously
- Arcade system: Atlus 68000

Known as Gogetsuji Gaiden: Saikyou Densetsu (豪血寺外伝: 最強伝説) in Japan. This installment lacks the Power Instinct title in its localization; this would be a trend for the series in its subsequent western releases, officially phasing out the Power Instinct branding. However, the game was incorrectly listed in MAME as Power Instinct Legends, although the naming error has since been fixed. The game's story picks up from the last game, with Otane being defeated by Kanji Kokuin, who became the new leader of the Gouketsuji clan.

This game is a sort of "update" to Power Instinct 2. All previous characters reappear, plus a few new characters. Super Kurara and Pochi are individual characters; because of this, Kurara and Kinta lost their transformations but gained new moves to replace them. Otane is also made playable. There is one new playable character, Kuroko, and a new playable boss, Chuck, bringing the cast to 16 fighters.

The battles are in teams of two characters, a leader and a partner. This plays out similarly to The King of Fighters, where you fight with each character one after the other. A Super Block and a Charge Attack were brought into the gameplay. A Super Block can nullify the opponent's blow and allow for a counterattack, and a Charge Attack can immediately knock down the opponent or launch them into the air for another attack. All of the fighters were given new special attacks, though the majority of them were exclusive to this game.

In Japan, Game Machine listed Gogetsuji Legends as the fourteenth most successful arcade game of October 1995.

=== Groove on Fight ===
Groove on Fight
- Developer: Atlus
- Publisher: Atlus
- Platforms: Arcade, Sega Saturn
- Release: April 1997
- Genre: Fighting game
- Mode: Up to 2 players simultaneously
- Arcade system: Sega Titan Video

Fully titled Groove on Fight: Gōketsuji Ichizoku 3 (グルーヴ オン ファイト 豪血寺一族3), this was a Japan exclusive. The story takes place 20 years after the last Gōketsuji tournament. It has a darker and more serious tone than its predecessors, similar to that of Garou: Mark of the Wolves, but still maintains some of the same humor that is particular to the series. Otane and Oume are the only returning characters, fighting as a single entry as they tied themselves back-to-back to each other.

The players can choose from eleven characters; all of them, save Otane/Oume, are new. The graphic style of Groove on Fight is very different from its predecessors, as the sprites are smaller, but are more fluid and have an animated look to them.

The Sega Saturn port of the game included some features like being able to play as Damian, Bristol Weller, and Bristol-D once the player beats the game with certain characters, the possibility of four players to play at the same time by way of the Saturn's multi-tap and an "Omake Mode" where the players can view artwork of the characters for the game. The Saturn version also features an arranged version of the soundtrack that has some new music themes that were not present in the original, like the theme "Mystic" and the vocal version of the title song.

==== Gameplay ====
Gameplay is in a 2-on-2 format much like Legends, but with the ability to tag in and out at any time between players, similar to X-Men vs. Street Fighter. Whenever the player tags successfully between characters, the character who is on the sidelines slowly begins to get his or her energy back.

A big difference from the previous games is that Groove on Fight has a six buttons system. The two new buttons are for "Dodge" and for the "Powerful Blow", but are also used for stronger versions of special moves. the "Dodge" allows the characters to evade attacks and then counterattack the opponent. The "Powerful Blow" is an attack that inflicts more damage to the opponent than the normal strong attacks, but is also slower. The special guard and the shadow moves from Gogetsuji Legends are still present in the game and some other new characteristics were introduced to the gameplay:

Characteristics
| Name | Description |
|---|---|
| Body Toss | The character throws the body of a defeated character at the opponent. |
| Taunt | Pressing the start button will taunt the opponent. Introduced for the first time in the series. |
| Unblockable Attack | Each character has his/her own Unblockable Attack. This attack is very slow, but if hits cause a great amount of damage to the opponent. |
| Partner Attack | The character that is not fighting will perform a jump-in attack from the sidelines. |
| Dual Combo | Is a series of attacks performed by the two characters at the same time. This requires one level of the Stress meter. |
| Pounce | Pressing up + Light kick, Hard Kick, as soon as the character knocks an opponent down, will attack the downed foe. |

=== Matrimelee ===
This new sequel, fully titled Shin Gouketsuji Ichizoku: Toukon -Matrimelee- (新豪血寺一族 闘婚 -Matrimelee-) in Japan, brings back the roster from Power Instinct 2 (except Angela, Oshima, Sahad and Kinta, the latter of whom was replaced by his alter-ego, Pochi), plus 4 totally new characters and one new boss (Princess Sissy). However, all the characters introduced in Groove of Fight were discarded. Jimmy, Elias, Lynn and Jones from Rage of the Dragons are guest stars, and are unlockable. A few of the game elements were borrowed from that same game as well. The western releases drop the Shin Gouketsuji Ichizoku title and remains named simply as Matrimelee (though the Toukon mark still appears). Released in 2003, it was one of the last games to be released on the Neo Geo.

It was followed by PlayStation 2 port Shin Gōketsuji Ichizoku: Bonnō Kaihō (新・豪血寺一族 煩悩解放), released exclusively in Japan. It features enhanced graphics and sound, the return of two of the older characters (Angela Belti and Kinta Kokuin), a new boss (Bobby Strong), and the return of the transformation feature. Gameplay was also improved in some areas, and super attacks were made easier to execute. The game has the same backgrounds and all the characters from Matrimelee (except the four secret characters from Rage of the Dragons), and because of that it is usually described as a port of the game, while in fact the game's story takes place after the events from the previous game, making it a sort of sequel or update. The game tells the story of the king from the previous game, who holds a "Bonnou Kaihou" ("Liberation of Lusts") tournament to cheer up his daughter Princess Sissy. This time the prize is anything that the winner could wish for (except the throne succession).

=== Gōketsuji Ichizoku: Matsuri Senzo Kuyō ===
Gōketsuji Ichizoku: Matsuri Senzo Kuyō
- Developer: Noise Factory
- Publisher: Atlus
- Platform: Arcade
- Release: August 2009 (Taito Type X); February 22, 2012 (Taito NESiCAxLive)
- Genre: Fighting game
- Mode: Up to 2 players simultaneously
- Arcade system: Taito Type X, Taito NESiCAxLive

Gōketsuji Ichizoku: Matsuri Senzo Kuyō (豪血寺一族 先祖供養) is the sixth game in the series. It refocuses on the Gōketsuji clan, with Oume announcing a new tournament to honour the clan's common progenitor, Shinjūrō Gōketsuji. The combo system is now an aerial-based, akin to Arc System Works’ previous fighting games, such as Guilty Gear. Several new characters were introduced.

== Merchandise ==
Various merchandise based on the series has been released in Japan. The 253-page 1995 novel Gouketsuji Ichizoku: The Novel (ISBN 978-4-8470-3158-8) was published by Wani Books in 1995. It relates the history of the Gōketsuji family and features some art made by Range Murata. Gōketsuji Ichizoku: THE CD-ROM was published in 1998 by Toshiba EMI and contains information about the series including characters profiles, correlation diagrams, the family lineage, concept art, sounds and other artwork. It also has desktop wallpapers and screen savers.

Soundtracks to the first five games in the series were also released. Pony Canyon/Scitron released the first four, while Noise Factory released the Matrimelee soundtrack. In 2005, Noise Factory released a box set of all soundtracks to the first five games in the series, along with a 2005 calendar featuring art from them. Unlike the original releases, the CDs in the box set do not include the sound effects collections and the Groove on Fight's CD has the arranged tracks from the Sega Saturn.
