= Range Murata =

Japanese artist and designer (born 1968)

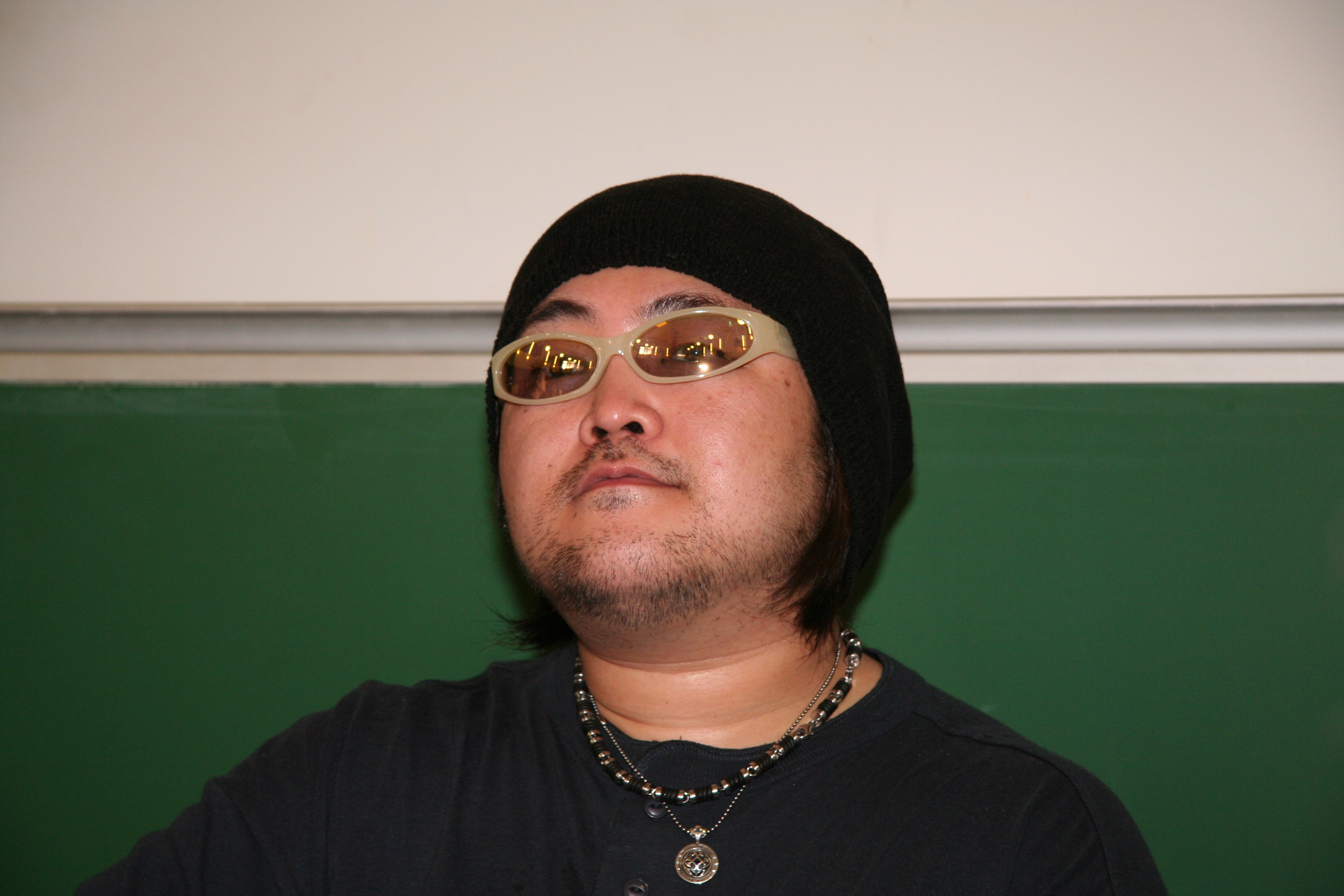
- Murata in 2008
- Born: October 2, 1968 (age 57); Osaka, Japan
- Occupations: Artist, designer
- Known for: Last Exile; Blue Submarine No. 6

Range Murata (村田 蓮爾, Murata Renji; born October 2, 1968) is a Japanese illustrator and manga artist, known for his unique style combining dieselpunk and Japanese moé elements. He is best known for his conceptual design work on anime series Last Exile and Blue Submarine No. 6.

He began his career in the early 1990s doing design work for video games, including having done the illustrations and character design for the fighting game series made by Atlus, Power Instinct (Goketsuji Ichizoku).

He has published more than a dozen books of his work, some of the most notable being rule and futurhythm. He won the 2006 Seiun Award for "Best Artist of the Year".

== Works ==
Illustration by Range Murata

=== Anime ===
- The Animatrix (The Second Renaissance)
- Blue Submarine No. 6
- Last Exile
- Mardock Scramble (OVA version, canceled)
- SoltyRei (Rose Anderson's bike design only)
- Table and Fisherman
- Shangri-La
- Last Exile -Fam, The Silver Wing-
- ID-0
- BEM
- BEM: Become Human
- Cop Craft

=== Video games ===
- The Power Instinct series (Goketsuji Ichizoku in Japan)
  - Groove on Fight
- Spy Fiction
- Wachenröder
- Taisen Hot Gimmick
- Blue Submarine no.6 ~Time & Tide~

=== Printed works ===
- Attack on Titan: Harsh Mistress of the City (art)
- Cop Craft (art)
- Star of Guidance
- Artbooks
  - Like a Balance Life
  - futurhythm
  - Form|Code
  - robot
  - futurelog
- Doujinshi
  - Racten
  - Throw Line

=== Other works ===
Murata has been designing figures based on his printed art since at least 2007. These figures appear to be substantial (although small, that is less than 6×6×6 inches) works of art.

- Figures and sculpture
  - PSE Pro series figures, 1/10 scale
  - PSE Solid series small figures in sets of six (usually)
  - Pinky street collaborations
- Wall hangings
  - Silk screen on silk 28×44 inches
