= Wachenröder =

1998 video game

- Developers: TNS Co., Ltd.
- Publisher: Sega
- Director: Shūichi Miyazawa
- Producer: Motoharu Terasaki
- Designer: Yūto Azuma
- Programmer: Tōru Funakura
- Artists: Range Murata; Yasuyuki Ueda; Yoshitoshi Abe
- Composers: Ian McDonald; Satoshi Miyashita; Takayuki Negishi
- Platform: Sega Saturn
- Release: JP: August 6, 1998
- Genres: Simulation role-playing game, strategy
- Mode: Single-player

Wachenröder (Note: Japanese: バッケンローダー, Hepburn: Bakkenrōdā) is a 1998 Japanese simulation role playing game. It was developed by TNS Co., Ltd. and published by Sega for the Sega Saturn. It was never released outside of Japan.

== Gameplay ==
Gameplay screenshot.

Wachenröder is a simulation role playing game. Most of the game is presented in an isometric perspective, similar to the genrelike games Shining Force, Vandal Hearts, Front Mission or Final Fantasy Tactics, and consists of several turn-based fights separated by cutscenes. Some cutscenes are preceded by the playable character Bellebete narrating the story.

The stages consist of 3D maps, which can be turned in all directions, as well as zoomed in to get a closer look at the gameplay.

Combat in the game consists of turn based battles.

The story advances through use of pre-rendered computer generated movies.

== Plot ==
Many tactical role playing games were set in medieval settings, while Wachenröder is instead set in the Victorian era. The setting has been described as "steampunk".

The story takes place in a dark future on the island Edward, which is ruled by the noble and magnanimous King Wizar (who is imprisoned by the evil prime minister Vlad at the time which the game begins). In this alternate history, steam power is very sophisticated and the people hold it dear: vehicles, gadgetry or weapons are driven by vapor in place of electricity. This links Wachenröder, based on its contents and its overall design, to the steampunk genre.

Since the building of several wastewater treatment plants for the rich upper class, the citizens of Edoalds suffer more and more from diseases caused by hazardous waste and contaminated drinking water.

The player assumes the role of Lucian Taylor, who is in search of Imperator Duran, to avenge the illness-caused death of his younger sister, which he holds him responsible for.

== Development ==
Many of the game's artists were recruited from the anime industry. Anime and manga artist Range Murata was an artist for the game. Artist Takeyuki Takeya worked on Iria: Zeiram The Animation. Katsumi Yokota worked on character designs for the game. He also worked on Panzer Dragoon Saga, and Front Mission Alternative.

The game was previewed at the 1998 Tokyo Game Show.

The game was developed at a time when there was growing interest in the simulation RPG genre for four years in Japan.

Musician Ian McDonald (a member of Foreigner and King Crimson), contributed two tracks to the game's musical score. This is part of a larger trend in the late 1990s, where established musicians compose music for video games. Other examples Stewart Copeland composing the music for the Spyro the Dragon games, Ronnie Montrose composing the music for Mr. Bones, or various techno artists contributing to the soundtrack of the Ghost In The Shell PlayStation game.

The Wiener Werkstätte logo is printed on the game's cover, the CD-ROM, and used in the actual game itself.

== Release ==
The game was released in Japan on August 6, 1998 for the Sega Saturn, and published by Sega. The game received a television commercial featuring the character Segata Sanshiro.

The little artbook that comes packed with the game begins with a longer German text that tells the background story in lyric poetry.

The game's soundtrack, Wachenröder Original Game Soundtrack, was published by Marvelous Entertainment.

The game received previews in various magazines in Europe and North America. However, it was never released outside of Japan.

== Reception ==
Reception

Review scores
Publication	Score
Famitsu	29/40
Sega Saturn Magazine (JP)	7/10
Gamers' Republic	B-

Weekly Famitsu gave the game a score of 29 out of 40. Reviewers compared the presentation and graphics to Final Fantasy Tactics.

The German magazine Video Games praised the quality of the use of the German that exists in the game.

Three reviewers for the Japanese Sega Saturn Magazine gave the game scores of 7, 6, and 8 respectively.

Gamers' Republic gave the game a B−, while praising the artwork and music, but were highly critical of the gameplay and graphics. Instead, the reviewer recommended Shining Force III: Scenario 2 as a better import title to play. In a separate review for the game's soundtrack, Gamers' Republic gave the score a B and recommended the music for fans of rpg music.

In 2001, IGN writer David Smith listed the game as the second most wished game he would like to see ported to the PlayStation. He praised the artwork of the game saying "the character design and world art have a wonderfully grim, clammy, sepia-toned neo-Victorian sort of quality to them."
