= Touken Ranbu =

2015 video game and its franchise

- Developer: Nitroplus
- Publisher: DMM Games
- Platforms: Adobe Flash (EoL), .NET Core
- Release: JP: January 14, 2015; Mainland China: 2017; WW: April 27, 2021
- Genre: Online web browser game

Touken Ranbu (Japanese: 刀剣乱舞, Hepburn: Tōken Ranbu; lit. 'Wild Dance of Swords') is a free-to-play collectible card browser video game developed by Nitroplus and DMM Games. The game was launched in Japan in January 2015, in mainland China in 2017, and worldwide in April 2021.

The franchise has inspired and been adapted as four anime productions, two separate productions of a long-running stage play series, a Kabuki theatre production, two live-action films, and a spin-off game.

There are also several official comic anthologies and three manga series that use an anthology format.

== Gameplay ==
Touken Ranbu Logo (from 2015 to 2022)

Players assume the role of a sage (審神者, saniwa) who travels into the past to defeat evil forces, and has the ability to animate legendary swords, which are depicted as attractive young men. Touken Ranbu is essentially a gender-swapped clone of Kantai Collection, another game by DMM, which uses moe anthropomorphism to portray historical warships as young girls. Character designs in Touken Ranbu are inspired by the type of sword they portray as well as the period of history they come from. Combat is largely automated, with progress mainly dependent on resource management and grinding. Farming the four types of materials available in the game is required to forge and collect more swords. A number of actions in game are controlled by real time countdowns, such as repairs and forging or collecting new swords.

Touken Ranbu can be played in a web browser or in a phone application. The worldwide version of the game was hosted on the website of Chinese game developer Johren, but ended service in 2023. However, the mainland China version of the app is still available.

== Reception ==
Touken Ranbu quickly became very popular in Japan, particularly with young women, and had over 1.5 million registered players by 2016. The game has been credited with accelerating the Japanese cultural trend of "katana women" (カタナ女子, katana joshi) – women who are interested in, and who pose with, historical Japanese swords. That trend had been started a few years previously with the Sengoku Basara video games, which made katana fans a distinct part of the Japanese subculture of female history aficionados (reki-jo). The popularity of Touken Ranbu was such that a Japanese women's interest magazine published an article about exercise routines based on sword fighting techniques from the game, and the 2015 Tokyo Wonder Festival's figure exhibition was reportedly "completely dominated by hot male swordsmen".

Based on a December 16, 2023, survey conducted by Nikkei Entertainment with almost 50,000 responses, the fanbase of Touken Ranbu within Japan has an average age of 34 years, and is almost exclusively female-dominated.

Touken Ranbu has inspired various restoration campaigns for swords represented in the game which were destroyed or damaged in real life. Donors contributed 45 million yen to a crowdfund in order to make a replica of Hotarumaru.

== Related media ==
=== Anime ===
The game has received two anime adaptations. The first is Touken Ranbu: Hanamaru (2016) by Doga Kobo and Toho, and the second is Katsugeki/Touken Ranbu (2017) by Ufotable and Aniplex.

An anime adaptation of the series' 2016 stage play Touken Ranbu Kyoden Moyuru Honnōji, produced by DOMERICA, aired from April to May 2024.

An anime adaptation of the mixed-media project by Sanrio, titled Wanpaku! Touken Ranbu has been announced. It is produced by Fanworks and directed by Gaku Kinoshita, with Rieko Ebisu handling the series composition. The series is set to premiere on January 6, 2027 on Tokyo MX.

=== Printed media ===
Since 2015, Touken Ranbu has inspired various Manga adaptations, primarily in the form of anthologies published in various magazines such as Monthly Bushiroad, Hana to Yume, B's Log, G Fantasy, and Monthly Comic Gene, among others.

In 2022, three more manga adaptations were announced for serialization:

Touken Ranbu: Outdoor Ibun Touken Camp, a Iyashikei manga adaptation centered on the main cast borrowing the camping equipment of the Saniwa for their missions or adventures. The series is illustrated by Ikra and serialized in Princess.

Touken Ranbu Side Story Tale Of Ayakashi, a manga adaptation telling an original story in the franchise. The series is illustrated by Yaeko Ninagawa and published by Monthly Comic Zenon.

Touken Ranbu: Nihongo Tsurezure Sake, a cooking manga centered on the great spear Nihongou as he serves exceptional sake and snacks for his comrades in the citadel. The manga is illustrated by Okamura Kenji and serialized in Nichibun Comics.

=== Stage plays ===
Touken Ranbu has inspired a series of 2.5D stage plays and musicals since 2016. The stage plays and musicals were both announced simultaneously in 2015 with different companies and cast members behind the two separate productions. Musical: Touken Ranbu, produced with Nelke Planning, first ran on October 30, 2015. Stage: Touken Ranbu, produced by Marvelous and Dentsu, began running on May 3, 2016.

Touken Ranbu has also inspired a traditional Kabuki stage production titled Touken Ranbu: Tsuki no Tsurugi Enishi no Kiri no wa, which was announced in 2022 and performed in Shinbashi Enbujo theater in Tokyo in July 2023.

=== Ice Show ===
Touken Ranbu has inspired an ice show titled Touken Ranbu - ICE BLADE -, which was performed at Yoyogi National Stadium on October 3 and 4 in 2026. It is notably the first 2.5D Touken Ranbu performance to blend live actors with voice acting from the sword casts original voice actors.

=== Film ===
A live-action film adaptation was released on January 18, 2019. The cast from Stage: Touken Ranbu reprised their roles. The film was distributed by Toho and Universal Pictures, directed by Saiji Yakumo, and written by Yasuko Kobayashi.

=== Spin-off games ===
In August 2021, Koei Tecmo announced they were developing Touken Ranbu Warriors, a hack and slash game based on their Warriors franchise. The game was developed by Omega Force and Ruby Party, with DMM Games and Nitroplus distributing. The game was released for the Nintendo Switch and Microsoft Windows on February 17, 2022, in Japan. It was later released on May 24, 2022, in North America and Europe.

In January 2025, the Touken Ranbu franchise announced a spin-off mobile match-3 role-playing game titled Touken Ranbu Pazugiri. The game is developed by DMM Games, in collaboration with NHN PlayArt. It is set to release in Autumn 2026 on PC and mobile devices.

In September 2026, Nintendo Direct announced a crossover title for Touken Ranbu with the Fitness Boxing series titled Fitness Boxing: Touken Ranbu – Shutsujin! Exercise Honmaru. It is set to release in January 15, 2027, on the Nintendo Switch and the Nintendo Switch 2.
