= Alice in Borderland =

Japanese suspense manga series by Haro Aso

- First tankōbon volume cover, featuring Ryohei Arisu

今際の国のアリス (Imawa no Kuni no Arisu)
- Genre: Supernatural horror; Survival; Suspense
- Manga
- Written by: Haro Aso
- Published by: Shogakukan
- English publisher: NA: Viz Media
- Imprint: Shōnen Sunday Comics
- Magazine: Shōnen Sunday S; (November 25, 2010 – March 25, 2015); Weekly Shōnen Sunday; (April 8, 2015 – March 2, 2016)
- Original run: November 25, 2010 – March 2, 2016
- Volumes: 18
Further information
Manga
Alice in Borderland: Side Stories
Written by	Haro Aso
Published by	Shogakukan
Magazine	Weekly Shōnen Sunday
Original run	July 11, 2012 – February 4, 2015
Original video animation
Directed by	Hideki Tachibana
Produced by	Tomohiko Iwase; Hiro Torimitsu; Ryō Ōyama (1)
Written by	Ryōsuke Nakamura
Music by	Hiroaki Tsutsumi
Studio	Silver Link; Connect
Licensed by	BI: MVM Entertainment; NA: Sentai Filmworks
Released	October 17, 2014 – February 18, 2015
Episodes	3
Manga
Alice on Border Road
Written by	Haro Aso
Illustrated by	Takayoshi Kuroda
Published by	Shogakukan
Imprint	Sunday GX Comics
Magazine	Monthly Sunday Gene-X
Original run	August 19, 2015 – February 19, 2018
Volumes	8
Manga
Alice in Borderland Retry
Written by	Haro Aso
Published by	Shogakukan
English publisher	NA: Viz Media
Imprint	Shōnen Sunday Comics
Magazine	Weekly Shōnen Sunday
Original run	October 14, 2020 – January 20, 2021
Volumes	2
- Live-action series
- Alice in Borderland (2020)
- icon

Alice in Borderland (Japanese: 今際の国のアリス, Hepburn: Imawa no Kuni no Arisu) is a Japanese manga series written and illustrated by Haro Aso. It was first serialized in Shogakukan's shōnen manga magazine Shōnen Sunday S from November 2010 to March 2015, and later moved to Weekly Shōnen Sunday, where it ran from April 2015 to March 2016. Its chapters were collected in 18 tankōbon volumes. Alice in Borderland was adapted into a three-episode original video animation (OVA), released from October 2014 to February 2015.

A spin-off series, Alice on Border Road, illustrated by Takayoshi Kuroda, was serialized in Shogakukan's seinen manga magazine Monthly Sunday Gene-X from August 2015 to February 2018, with its chapters collected in eight tankōbon volumes. A sequel, written and illustrated by Aso, Alice in Borderland Retry, was serialized in Weekly Shōnen Sunday from October 2020 to January 2021, with its chapters collected in two tankōbon volumes.

A live-action television series adaptation, produced by Netflix and directed by Shinsuke Sato, premiered worldwide with an eight-episode first season in December 2020; it was followed by an eight-episode second season in December 2022. A third season premiered in September 2025, and features an original story beyond the manga.

== Plot ==
Ryohei Arisu is an apathetic young man who finds little meaning in his daily life, spending most of his time with friends Daikichi Karube, a responsible bar owner, and the carefree Chōta Segawa. Their mundane existence is shattered when mysterious fireworks transport them to a deserted, vegetation-choked version of Tokyo called the Borderlands, the land between life and death. There they meet Saori Shibuki, another stranded player who explains the brutal rules of this new world—participants must risk their lives in deadly games based on playing cards. Every player has a visa and the number of the playing card that they complete corresponds to how many days they have left on their visa until they must play the next game. For example, if a player competes a Five of Hearts difficulty game, five days will be added to their visas, meaning they have five more days without having to play another game. Once the five days are up and they haven't completed a game, they will be killed.

Their first game, "Three of Clubs", tests their knowledge under threat of flames bursting from the floor, leaving Chota injured. As they navigate this dangerous new reality, the group faces increasingly perilous games. Arisu and Karube decide to enter another game to try and find a doctor to tend to Chota's injuries. The game, "Five of Spades", has players evade two armed taggers while trying to find a special door. Arisu and Karube barely make it out alive with the help of other players who become more prominent such as Yuzuha Usagi, Morizono Aguni, and Shuntarō Chishiya. In the group's next game, the devastating "Seven of Hearts", Karube, Chota and Shibuki make the ultimate sacrifice to ensure Arisu's survival. Emotionally shattered, Arisu eventually teams up with the resourceful climber Yuzuha Usagi from the game "Five of Spades". Together they seek the Beach, a player stronghold led by the eccentric "Mad Hatter" who believes collecting all game cards will grant freedom.

The Beach's order collapses when it becomes the arena for the "Ten of Hearts" game. Following its completion, the mysterious Game Masters reveal this was only the first stage—now survivors must face even deadlier challenges against the powerful "Face Card" opponents to escape the Borderland. The revelation sets the stage for an even greater struggle for survival.

== Characters ==
=== Main ===
Ryohei Arisu (有栖 良平, Arisu Ryōhei) / Alice
Voiced by: Yoshimasa Hosoya (Japanese); Jeremy Gee (English)
Portrayed by: Kento Yamazaki
A video-game obsessed third year high school student (24 years old in the Netflix series) who "does not fit in with his family". Due to his addiction to video games, he was shown to be a skilled analyzer, solving puzzles and patterns on the games, and specializes in playing heart games.
Yuzuha Usagi (宇佐木 柚葉, Usagi Yuzuha) / The Rabbit
Voiced by: Minako Kotobuki (Japanese); Olivia Swasey (English)
Portrayed by: Tao Tsuchiya
A mountain climber who was transported into the Borderlands shortly after the death of her father, whom she deeply respected. Usagi teams up with Arisu shortly after the deaths of his friends. Due to her experience in mountain climbing, she specializes in spade games. In the third season of the Netflix adaptation, she and Arisu are married and are expecting their first child together.

=== The Borderlands ===
==== Arisu's friends ====
Daikichi Karube (苅部 大吉, Karube Daikichi) / The Walrus
Voiced by: Tatsuhisa Suzuki (Japanese); Joe Daniels (English)
Portrayed by: Keita Machida
In the original manga, Karube is a high school student who owns a bar. The Netflix adaptation reimagines him as a bartender preparing to propose to a coworker, who is secretly involved with his boss. He is a close friend of Arisu and Chōta.
Chōta Segawa (勢川 張太, Segawa Chōta) / The Carpenter
Voiced by: Tsubasa Yonaga (Japanese); Greg Ayres (English)
Portrayed by: Yūki Morinaga
A high schooler (IT technician in the Netflix series) and friend of Arisu and Karube. He is immature and slightly perverted, although he means well and is loyal to his friends. In the Netflix series, he is sensible, highly religious and under pressure due to his mother taking his money for her cult.
Saori Shibuki (紫吹 小織, Shibuki Saori)
Voiced by: Maaya Sakamoto (Japanese); Rachael Messer (English)
Portrayed by: Ayame Misaki
Shibuki is the first player encountered by Arisu and his friends in the deserted city. In the manga, she is a determined individual who develops a genuine care for the group, ultimately choosing to sacrifice herself. The Netflix adaptation portrays her as a skilled but manipulative player who assists the group primarily for her own benefit.

==== Allied players ====
Shuntarō Chishiya (苣屋 駿太郎, Chishiya Shuntarō) / The Cheshire Cat
Voiced by: Takahiro Sakurai (Japanese); Blake Jackson (English)
Portrayed by: Nijirō Murakami
A mysterious, nonchalant, quiet, and sly player who teams up with Kuina to steal Hatter's deck of cards, the leader and founder of "the Beach", believing that a full deck would transport them out of the empty city. He later becomes interested in Arisu and Usagi after helping them escape a game of Tag.
Hikari Kuina (水鶏 光, Kuina Hikari) / The Caterpillar
Portrayed by: Aya Asahina
A member of the Beach who works with Chishiya to steal the deck of cards; however, the two fall out when Chishiya betrays her, so she abandons him in favor of working with Arisu and Usagi. In the Netflix series, the two never fall out and she constantly asks people if he is okay after they are separated. A former clothing shop clerk, she is revealed to be transgender, and was disowned by her father.
Kōdai Tatta (竜田 康大, Tatta Kōdai)
Portrayed by: Yutaro Watanabe
A young mechanic who is saved by Arisu during a game and later becomes his ally. He later sacrifices himself to save Arisu and the others during the King of Clubs game.
Akane Heiya (塀谷 朱音, Heiya Akane) / The March Hare
Portrayed by: Yuri Tsunematsu
A highschooler with a special affinity for archery who later partners with Dodo and Aguni. She lost her leg in the first game she participated in.
Hayato Dōdō (堂道 隼人, Dōdō Hayato) / The Dodo Bird
A third-year middle schooler Arisu saves in the Four of Hearts game who later partners with Aguni and Akane, who he grows close with. He is the only major character that was never adapted in the Netflix series.

==== Beach ====
Takeru Danma (弾間 剛, Danma Takeru) / The Mad Hatter (帽子屋, Hatter)
Portrayed by: Nobuaki Kaneko
A former hatter and the leader and founder of "the Beach", a hotel inhabited by dozens of players. His main goal is to collect all the playing cards given to players for winning games. He later went mad due to his various attempts to escape the game and after a planned plot, deliberately gets himself killed by Aguni to relieve him of his despair.
Morizono Aguni (粟国 杜園, Aguni Morizono) / The Knave of Hearts
Portrayed by: Sho Aoyagi
A strong fighter and Hatter's best friend, Aguni is first introduced as an important member of "the Beach". He is in charge of a violent group at the beach titled "The Militants". After the death of the Hatter and the "Witch Hunt" game, he ventures out alone, later meeting and teaming up with Akane and Dodo.
Rizuna An (安 梨鶴奈, An Rizuna) / The White Queen
Portrayed by: Ayaka Miyoshi
An executive member of "the Beach" who attempts to win difficult games through rational thinking. Ann is one of the key players in the "Witch Hunt" game. She later teams up with Arisu and Kuina.
Suguru Niragi (韮木 傑, Niragi Suguru) / The Jub Jub Bird
Portrayed by: Dori Sakurada
A young yet dangerous member of "the Beach", described as being "aggressive due to his complicated past". He is a part of "the Militants". He was severely injured by Chishiya and Aguni during the "Witch Hunt" game and harbors a deep hatred for Chishiya and Arisu. However, he begrudgingly teams up with Arisu during the King of Clubs game, in which he ventures out alone at the end.

==== Gamemasters/citizens ====
Mira Kano (加納 未来, Kanō Mira) / The Queen of Hearts
Portrayed by: Riisa Naka
One of the face card gamemasters: The Queen of Hearts of the borderlands. A mysterious woman with an "elegant presence", she first appeared as an executive member of "the Beach". The only female main gamemaster. Unlike other gamemasters who are just civilians playing the roles for the borderlands, she seems to be the only one who knows the true origins of the Borderlands. She is later defeated by Arisu.
Keiichi Kuzuryū (九頭龍 慧一, Kuzuryū Keiichi) / The King of Diamonds
Portrayed by: Tsuyoshi Abe
One of the face card gamemasters: The King of Diamonds of the borderlands, who is a former failed lawyer struggling to find equality in life. Like Mira, he also first appeared as an executive member of "the Beach". He is the most cunning and smartest of the gamemasters. He is later defeated by Chishiya.
Ginji Kyūma (久間 欣治, Kyūma Ginji) / The King of Clubs
Portrayed by: Tomohisa Yamashita
One of the face card gamemasters: The King of Clubs of the borderlands, who is a nudist and a former musician in a band with his group who leads the Osmosis game. The most laid-back and humane of the gamemasters, he is the only gamemaster who Arisu deeply respects. He is later defeated by Arisu after the latter manage to trick him in the last minute of the game.
Isao Shīrabi (稚羅日 勲, Shīrabi Isao) / The King of Spades
Portrayed by: Ayumi Tanida
The King of Spades is a formidable gamemaster, described as a mercenary and former special forces soldier. He oversees the brutal Survival game and is the most combative of the face card holders. After numerous confrontations with Arisu and his allies, Aguni ultimately shoots and kills him in a final struggle.
Enji Matsushita (マツシタ エンジ, Matsushita Enji) / The Jack of Hearts
Portrayed by: Kai Inowaki
One of the face card gamemasters: The Jack of Hearts of the borderlands, who appears to be a sly young man in the prison game, although in reality he is revealed to be manipulative and sadistic. He was exposed as the Jack of Hearts through Banda and Yaba's unexpected alliance and Chishiya's deduction, in which in turn he was killed by the duo in order to clear the game.
Risa (リサ) / The Queen of Spades
Portrayed by: Chihiro Yamamoto
The Queen of Spades is a highly athletic individual who oversees the "Checkmate" game. Usagi ultimately defeats her by convincing all other players to unite against her, leaving the Queen without any opposition.
Sunato Banda (バンダ スナト, Banda Sunato) / The Bandersnatch
Portrayed by: Hayato Isomura
A serial killer who participates in the games, Banda chooses to remain in the Borderlands as a citizen, seeking to rule it.

=== Others ===
Arisu Kojima (小島 亜里朱, Kojima Arisu)
A high school student and softball player from Tokyo. She is transported to a desolate version of Kyoto. In this Borderland, she becomes the holder of the Queen of Hearts card.
"Joker"
Portrayed by: Ken Watanabe
An enigmatic entity appears to Arisu, places the Joker card on the table, and asks whether it reminds him of a god or a devil. Arisu realizes that the entity is actually neither, it is an intermediary that helps humans pass on to the afterlife, and the entity smiles.

== Media ==
=== Manga ===
Alice in Borderland, written and illustrated by Haro Aso, was serialized in Shogakukan's shōnen manga magazine Shōnen Sunday S magazine from November 25, 2010, to March 25, 2015, and later moved to Weekly Shōnen Sunday on April 8, 2015, and finished on March 2, 2016. Shogakukan collected its 65 individual chapters in 18 tankōbon volumes, published from April 18, 2011, to April 18, 2016.

On July 9, 2021, Viz Media announced that it had licensed the series for English publication. It was published in nine two-in-one volumes published from March 15, 2022, to March 19, 2024.

==== Other stories ====
Six side stories, later included in the main series volumes, were published in Weekly Shōnen Sunday from 2012 to 2015:

- "Four of Hearts" (はあとのよん, Haato no Yon) (July 11–25, 2012)
- "Four of Clubs" (くらぶのよん, Kurabu no Yon) (January 16–23, 2013)
- "Six of Diamonds" (だいやのろく, Daiya no Roku) (May 22–29, 2013)
- "Seven of Spades" (すぺえどのなな, Supēdo no Nana) (August 21 – September 4, 2013)
- "King of Spades" (すぺえどのきんぐ, Supēdo no Kingu) (December 11, 2013 – June 18, 2014)
- "King of Diamonds" (だいやのきんぐ, Daiya no Kingu) (October 15, 2014 – February 4, 2015)

A spin-off series, titled Alice on Border Road (今際の路のアリス, Imawa no Michi no Arisu), written by Aso and illustrated by Takayoshi Kuroda, was published in Shogakukan's seinen manga magazine Monthly Sunday Gene-X from August 19, 2015, to February 19, 2018. Shogakukan collected its chapters in eight tankōbon volumes, published from January 18, 2016, to March 19, 2017.

Another series, titled Alice in Borderland Retry (今際の国のアリス RETRY, Imawa no Kuni no Arisu Retry), was serialized in Weekly Shōnen Sunday from October 14, 2020, to January 20, 2021. Shogakukan collected its chapters in two tankōbon volumes, released on December 11, 2020, and February 18, 2021. In October 2025, Viz Media announced that it had licensed Alice in Borderland Retry for English-language publication that is set to debut in Q3 2026.

==== Volumes ====
===== Alice in Borderland =====
No.	Original release date	Original ISBN	English release date	English ISBN
1	April 18, 2011	978-4-09-122819-2	March 15, 2022	978-1-9747-2837-4
2	September 16, 2011	978-4-09-123269-4	March 15, 2022	978-1-9747-2837-4
3	January 18, 2012	978-4-09-123444-5	June 21, 2022	978-1-9747-2855-8
4	July 18, 2012	978-4-09-123779-8	June 21, 2022	978-1-9747-2855-8
5	October 18, 2012	978-4-09-123897-9	September 20, 2022	978-1-9747-2856-5
6	January 18, 2013	978-4-09-124171-9	September 20, 2022	978-1-9747-2856-5
7	May 17, 2013	978-4-09-124304-1	December 20, 2022	978-1-9747-2857-2
8	August 16, 2013	978-4-09-124363-8	December 20, 2022	978-1-9747-2857-2
9	December 18, 2013	978-4-09-124514-4	March 21, 2023	978-1-9747-2858-9
10	March 18, 2014	978-4-09-124580-9	March 21, 2023	978-1-9747-2858-9
11	June 18, 2014	978-4-09-124667-7	June 20, 2023	978-1-9747-2859-6
12	October 17, 2014	978-4-09-125308-8	June 20, 2023	978-1-9747-2859-6
13	December 18, 2014	978-4-09-125416-0	September 19, 2023	978-1-9747-2860-2
14	February 18, 2015	978-4-09-125560-0	September 19, 2023	978-1-9747-2860-2
15	May 18, 2015	978-4-09-125837-3	December 19, 2023	978-1-9747-2861-9
16	September 18, 2015	978-4-09-126206-6	December 19, 2023	978-1-9747-2861-9
17	January 18, 2016	978-4-09-126698-9	March 19, 2024	978-1-9747-2862-6
18	April 18, 2016	978-4-09-127097-9	March 19, 2024	978-1-9747-2862-6

===== Alice on Border Road =====
No.	Release date	ISBN
1	January 18, 2016	978-4-09-157431-2
2	April 18, 2016	978-4-09-157444-2
3	August 19, 2016	978-4-09-157457-2
4	January 19, 2017	978-4-09-157471-8
5	June 19, 2017	978-4-09-157488-6
6	November 17, 2017	978-4-09-157505-0
7	January 19, 2018	978-4-09-157510-4
8	March 19, 2018	978-4-09-157516-6

===== Alice in Borderland: Retry =====
No.	Release date	ISBN
1	December 11, 2020	978-4-09-850365-0
2	February 18, 2021	978-4-09-850388-9

=== Original video animation ===
The series was adapted into a three-episode original video animation (OVA) produced by Silver Link and Connect and directed by Hideki Tachibana. The first OVA episode was bundled with the limited edition of the 12th volume of the manga on October 17, 2014. The second OVA episode was bundled with the limited edition of the 13th volume of the manga on December 18, 2014. The third and last OVA episode was bundled with the limited edition of the 14th volume of the manga on February 18, 2015. The opening theme is "NEXTAGE", performed by the Japanese female idol group Iris.

Sentai Filmworks licensed the OVAs for international distribution. MVM Entertainment licensed the OVA in the United Kingdom and Ireland.

No.	Title	Original release date
1	"Three of Clubs"; Transliteration: "Kurabu no San" (Japanese: くらぶのさん)	October 17, 2014
2	"Five of Spades"; Transliteration: "Supeedo no Go" (Japanese: すぺえどのご)	December 18, 2014
3	"Seven of Hearts"; Transliteration: "Haato no Nana" (Japanese: はあとのなな)	February 18, 2015

=== Live-action series ===
A live-action series, produced by Netflix and directed by Shinsuke Sato, premiered on December 10, 2020, in over 190 countries worldwide simultaneously. It stars Kento Yamazaki as Ryohei Arisu and Tao Tsuchiya as Yuzuha Usagi. In December 2020, a second season was announced, which premiered on December 22, 2022. In September 2023, it was announced that the series was renewed for a third season. It premiered on September 25, 2025, and features an original story beyond the manga.

== Reception ==
By March 2016, Alice in Borderland had over 1.3 million copies in circulation. Volume 11 reached the 48th place on the weekly Oricon manga charts and, as of June 22, 2014, has sold 21,496 copies.

The anime entry in The Encyclopedia of Science Fiction observed that the OVA "ends just as the viewer becomes engaged", whereas the later television series adaptation was "moderately well received".
