= Konda Teru no Gōhō Recipe =

Japanese manga series

- First tankōbon volume cover

紺田照の合法レシピ
- Genre: Comedy, gourmet
- Manga
- Written by: Isuke Mada
- Published by: Kodansha
- Imprint: KC Deluxe
- Magazine: Shōnen Magazine R
- Original run: April 20, 2015 – October 19, 2019
- Volumes: 9
- Television drama
- Directed by: Tadaaki Hōrai
- Written by: Kiyoshi Inoue; Yū Kanda
- Licensed by: Amazon Prime Video
- Original run: March 6, 2018 – April 24, 2018
- Episodes: 10

Konda Teru no Gōhō Recipe (紺田照の合法レシピ) is a Japanese manga series written and illustrated by Isuke Mada. It was serialized in Kodansha's shōnen manga magazine Shōnen Magazine R from April 2015 to October 2019. A live-action television drama adaptation aired on Amazon Prime Video from March to April 2018.

== Plot ==
Teru Konda is a new member of the Shimofuri Niku-gumi, a designated yakuza group based in Tokyo. Despite being only 18 years old, his courage and composure have saved the group from crisis numerous times, earning him everyone's respect. His hobby and special skill is "cooking." Even in the midst of perilous situations, Teru never forgets his culinary creativity.

== Media ==
=== Manga ===
Written and illustrated by Isuke Mada, Konda Teru no Gōhō Recipe was serialized in Kodansha's shōnen manga magazine Shōnen Magazine R from April 20, 2015, to October 19, 2019. Its chapters were compiled into nine tankōbon volumes from February 17, 2016, to November 15, 2019.

No.	Release date	ISBN
1	February 17, 2016	978-4-06-377431-3
2	August 17, 2016	978-4-06-393008-5
3	December 16, 2016	978-4-06-393122-8
4	July 14, 2017	978-4-06-393230-0
5	November 16, 2017	978-4-06-510434-7
6	March 16, 2018	978-4-06-511145-1
7	October 17, 2018	978-4-06-512217-4
8	March 15, 2019	978-4-06-514623-1
9	November 15, 2019	978-4-06-517515-6

=== Drama ===
A live-action television drama adaptation aired on Amazon Prime Video from March 6 to April 24, 2018. It starred Ryo Ryusei and Maika Yamamoto in the lead roles, and Sho Aoyagi, Mariko Shinoda, Yu Inaba, Arisa Komiya, and Ryo Kimura in supporting roles, and was directed by Tadaaki Hōrai, with scripts written by Kiyoshi Inoue and Yū Kanda.

== Reception ==
The series' second volume was recommended by manga artist group CLAMP.
