= Alice in Borderland (TV series) =

Japanese sci-fi television series

- Japanese: 今際の国のアリス
- Literal meaning: Arisu in the present world
- Genre: Science fiction; Thriller; Drama
- Based on: Alice in Borderland by Haro Aso
- Written by: Yoshiki Watabe; Yasuko Kuramitsu; Shinsuke Sato
- Directed by: Shinsuke Sato
- Starring: Kento Yamazaki; Tao Tsuchiya; Nijirō Murakami; Ayaka Miyoshi; Aya Asahina; Dori Sakurada; Sho Aoyagi; Riisa Naka; Yuri Tsunematsu; Kento Kaku; Tina Tamashiro; Risa Sudou; Koji Ohkura; Kotaro Daigo
- Composers: Yutaka Yamada; Benson Taylor (songs)
- Country of origin: Japan
- Original language: Japanese
- No. of seasons: 3
- No. of episodes: 22

Production
- Executive producer: Kaata Sakamoto
- Producer: Akira Morii
- Cinematography: Taro Kawazu
- Editors: Tsuyoshi Imai; Shoukichi Kaneda
- Camera setup: Multi-camera
- Running time: 41–80 minutes
- Production company: Robot Communications

Original release
- Network: Netflix
- Release: December 10, 2020 – September 25, 2025

Alice in Borderland (Japanese: 今際の国のアリス, Hepburn: Imawa no Kuni no Arisu; lit. 'Arisu in the present world') is a Japanese science fiction thriller drama television series based on the manga of the same name by Haro Aso. Released on Netflix, it premiered on December 10, 2020 and concluded with its third season on September 25, 2025; Shinsuke Sato directed all 22 episodes, which were all written by Sato and Yasuko Kuramitsu, with Yoshiki Watabe as co-writer for the first season.

Alice in Borderland stars a large cast led by Kento Yamazaki and Tao Tsuchiya as two of many "players" trapped in an empty, parallel version of Tokyo where they are forced to compete in life-or-death games. The type and difficulty of each game is represented by playing cards based on French suits and the games are used to extend their "visas" that, if expired, result in the player's execution. The series' first season was announced in July 2019 and filmed from August to December 2019. Although the third season was not originally labelled as the last, Netflix stated in a January 2026 article that it had been the show's final.

The series received high viewership in many countries and generally positive reviews from critics, who praised the action sequences, direction, and acting. They compared the show to many entries in the survival genre, including the films Battle Royale (2000) and Cube (1997).

== Premise ==
In the first season, Ryōhei Arisu and his two friends are suddenly transported to an alternate, desolate Tokyo, where they must play life-or-death games to survive.

In the second season, Arisu and the rest of the players must fight against the face cards, citizens of Borderland, while they seek to find out if they will return to their world if they win.

In the third and final season, Arisu is forced to return to the Borderland when Yuzuha Usagi enters again, convinced by Dr. Ryuji Matsuyama, a doctor obsessed with death, who is part of Sunato Banda's plan for Arisu. While trying to save Usagi by playing the life-and-death games again, Arisu seeks to defeat the Joker.

== Cast and characters ==
=== Main ===
- Kento Yamazaki as Ryōhei Arisu:
  A video game-obsessed man who "doesn't fit in with his family". He teams up with Usagi while in the Borderland and later develops romantic feelings for her. In season 3, he returns to the Borderland to search for Usagi and forms his own group of survivors. He survives the Joker Games and becomes a therapist upon returning to the real world.
- Tao Tsuchiya as Yuzuha Usagi:
  A mountain climber who was transported into the empty city of Tokyo shortly after the death of her father, whom she deeply respected. She teams up with Arisu while in the Borderland and later develops romantic feelings for him. In season 3, she returns to the Borderland under Ryuji's coaxing and forms her own group of survivors. She survives the Joker Games.
- Nijirō Murakami as Shuntarō Chishiya (seasons 1–2; guest season 3):
  A mysterious, quiet, and sly player who teams up with Kuina to steal Hatter's deck of cards, believing that a full deck would transport them out of the empty city. He later becomes interested in Arisu and Usagi after helping them escape a game of "tag". Before arriving in the Borderland, he was a medical student. He makes a cameo in season 3, discussing with Arisu what makes life worth living. He has a wife named Dani. Dani makes multiple season appearances alongside Chishiya. They are known to have a very strong relationship.
- Aya Asahina as Hikari Kuina (seasons 1–2; guest season 3):
  A close friend of Chishiya, whom she helps steal Hatter's deck of cards. She becomes a close ally and friend to Arisu. A former clothing shop clerk skilled in karate, Kuina is revealed to be transgender in a flashback in episode 7, in which she was disowned by her father. She makes a cameo in season 3, having made amends with her father and now helping at his karate school.
- Dori Sakurada as Suguru Niragi (seasons 1–2; guest season 3):
  A young yet dangerous member of "the Beach". He is described as being "aggressive due to his complicated past" and is part of "the Militants". Before arriving in the Borderland, he was often bullied by other students at his high school. He makes a cameo in season 3, having become a better person after returning from the Borderland and revealing he now works hard for the sake of his child.
- Ayaka Miyoshi as Rizuna Ann (seasons 1–2; recurring season 3):
  An executive member of "the Beach" who wins difficult games through rational thinking, later becoming an important ally and friend to Arisu and his group. Before arriving in the Borderland, she was a forensic scientist for the Tokyo Metropolitan Police. In season 2, she was injured by the King of Spades but managed to survive thanks to her will. In Season 3, being one of the last few people who remember the Borderland, she helps Arisu re-enter the Borderland.
- Sho Aoyagi as Morizono Aguni (seasons 1–2; guest season 3):
  A strong fighter and Hatter's best friend, Aguni is first introduced as an important member of "the Beach". He is in charge of a violent group named "the Militants". After leaving the Beach, he becomes an important ally to Arisu towards the end of the face-card games. He makes a cameo in season 3, working to keep Hatter's shop open.
- Riisa Naka as Mira Kanō (seasons 1–2):
  A mysterious woman with an "elegant presence", and an executive member of "the Beach". She is revealed to be the Queen of Hearts in the second season and the last enemy of Arisu and Usagi in the Borderland.
- Yuri Tsunematsu as Akane Heiya (season 2; guest season 3):
  A high school girl skilled in archery who works with Aguni after losing her foot in the Seven of Spades game. She makes a cameo in season 3, having become an influencer who inspires people.
- Kento Kaku as Ryuji Matsuyama (season 3):
  A university professor who is obsessed with the afterlife and wishes to see the Borderland. He enters with Usagi under Banda's deal to learn the truth about the world between life and death, joining her team in the process. After seeing the strong relationship and will between Arisu and Usagi, he sacrifices himself to save them.
- Tina Tamashiro as Rei Morikage (season 3):
  A cunning and quiet university student and former Borderland survivor; she allies with Arisu's team in the Joker games after the Zombie Hunt game. Thanks to her trust in Arisu, she survives the Joker Games.
- Risa Sudou as Sachiko Makino (season 3):
  A caring and resilient housewife and former Borderland survivor who allies with Arisu's team in the Joker games. She survives the Joker Games.
- Koji Ohkura as Tetsu Shimazaki (season 3):
  A kind-hearted drug addict and former Borderland survivor who allies with Arisu's team in the Joker games. He dies in the final Joker Game.
- Kotaro Daigo as Nobuaki "Nobu" Hida (season 3):
  A high-schooler with a tragic past of bullying and peer pressure and former Borderland survivor who allies with Arisu's team in the Joker Games, which he survives.

=== Recurring ===
- Yūki Morinaga as Chōta Segawa (seasons 1–2):
  A highly religious IT technician and friend of Arisu and Karube. Chōta severely burns his leg while participating in a game titled "Dead or Alive", and as a result, slows down his friends while recovering.
- Keita Machida as Daikichi Karube (seasons 1–2):
  A bartender and close friend to Arisu and Chōta. Before being transported into the empty city, Karube was preparing to propose to a woman he worked with at a bar, who happened to be his boss's lover.
- Yūtarō Watanabe as Kōdai Tatta (seasons 1–2):
  A former car mechanic who is saved by Arisu during a game and later becomes a member of the Beach; in season 2, he joins Arisu's group. Before arriving in the Borderland, his mistake caused his co-worker to lose a hand.
- Nobuaki Kaneko as Takeru Danma / Hatter (seasons 1–2):
  The leader and founder of "the Beach", a hotel inhabited by dozens of players. His main goal is to collect all the playing cards given to players for winning games. After his death in season 1, he often appears as a ghost to Aguni during the events of season 2.
- Tsuyoshi Abe as Keiichi Kuzuryū (seasons 1–2):
  An executive member of "the Beach". In the second season, he is revealed to be the King of Diamonds, and Chishiya participates in his game. Before arriving in the Borderland, he was a lawyer who was dissatisfied with the outlook of human life and the morality of others, particularly those in positions of power.
- Taisuke Matsushita as Shota (seasons 1–2):
  A Beach resident who survives the Witch Hunt. He drives a car with the others to get away from the King of Spades but is ultimately killed.
- Minehiro Kinomoto as Hiro (seasons 1–2):
  A Beach resident who survives the Witch Hunt. He becomes the first casualty of the King of Spades.
- Takehiro Otsuki as Tamotsu (seasons 1–2):
  A Beach resident who survives the Witch Hunt. He is in the car with the others to get away from the King of Spades but is ultimately killed.
- Mizuki Komatsu as Yui (seasons 1–2):
  A Beach resident who survives the Witch Hunt. She is in the car with the others to get away from the King of Spades but is ultimately killed.
- Rina Koyama as Konomi (seasons 1–2):
  A Beach resident who survives the Witch Hunt. She is killed by the King of Spades.
- Mizuki Sashide as Mizuki (seasons 1–2):
  A Beach resident who survives the Witch Hunt. She becomes the second casualty of the King of Spades.
- Aya Kitai as Lily (seasons 1–2):
  A Beach resident who survives the Witch Hunt. She is in the car with the others to get away from the King of Spades but is ultimately killed.
- Shigemitsu Ogi as Kenji Arisu (seasons 1–2):
  Ryohei Arisu's father.
- Kyotaro Tamura as Hajime Arisu (seasons 1–2):
  Ryohei Arisu's brother.
- Yūhei Ōuchida as Takuma (seasons 1–2):
  An injured player in the Four of Clubs game "Distance". In a flashback, he is revealed to have helped Kuzuryū in a game.
- Hayato Isomura as Sunato Banda (seasons 2–3):
  A serial killer who participates in the Jack of Hearts game with Chishiya and decides to stay in the Borderland as a citizen at the end of season 2. In season 3, he becomes the Gamemaster of the Joker games, with a scheme to lure Arisu back to the Borderland. He is killed at the end by the Watchman.
- Katsuya Maiguma as Oki Yaba (seasons 2–3):
  A con man who participates in the Jack of Hearts game with Chishiya and decides to stay in the Borderland at the end of season 2.

==== Season 1 ====
- Shuntarō Yanagi as Takatora Samura / the Last Boss:
  A strange man and dangerous member of "the Beach", the Last Boss has his face covered in tattoos and carries around a katana to intimidate members. He is also part of "the Militants"
- Ayame Misaki as Saori Shibuki:
  The first person Arisu and his friends encounter while in the deserted city. At first, Shibuki is presented as an experienced player who helps the group get past their first game. However, she is later revealed to be manipulative in order to get what she wants.
- Kina Yazaki as Momoka Inoue:
  A member of "the Beach", a 'game dealer', and Asahi's best friend.
- Mizuki Yoshida as Asahi Kujō:
  A member of "the Beach", a 'game dealer', and Momoka's best friend.
- Kosuke Kubota as Joe:
  A member of the Beach and part of the car maintenance team, alongside Tatta
- Ayaka Minami as Saiko:
  She is one of the Beach militants.
- Kento Shibuya as Jun:
  He is one of the Beach militants.
- Ken Aoki as Makoto:
  He is one of the Beach militants.
- Ippei Osako as Sugi:
  He is one of the Beach militants.
- Takashi Kitadai as Ken:
  He is one of the Beach militants.
- Shohei Abe as Yu:
  He is one of the Beach militants.
- Kazuma Sano as Yamane:
  A participant in the Four of Clubs game, "Distance"
- Kazuma Yamane as Seizan:
  A participant in the Four of Clubs game "Distance"
- Yûya Matsuura as Nitobe
- Ode Nanako as Minami
- Reiko Kataoka as Sayuri Segawa

==== Season 2 ====
- Tomohisa Yamashita as Ginji Kyuma:
  A band frontman and the King of Clubs, who is challenged by Arisu's group in the game "Osmosis".
- Ryōhei Shima as Sogo Shitara:
  A former member of Kyuma's band and his teammate in the Osmosis game.
- Alisa Urahama as Uta Kisaragi:
  A former member of Kyuma's band and his teammate in the Osmosis game.
- Eishin Hayashida as Takumi Maki:
  A former member of Kyuma's band and his teammate in the Osmosis game.
- Eita Okuno as Goken Kanzaki:
  A former member of Kyuma's band and his teammate in the Osmosis game.
- Kai Inowaki as Enji Matsushita:
  A sly young man who is later revealed to be the Jack of Hearts in the prison game with Chishiya.
- Aina Yamada as Urumi Akamaki:
  A sly, cunning woman who participates in the Jack of Hearts game with Chishiya
- Honami Satō as Kotoko Shiga:
  A woman who participates in the Jack of Hearts game with Chishiya
- Yuzuki Akiyama as Meisa Tokui:
  A woman who participates in the Jack of Hearts game with Chishiya
- Yusaku Mori as Ippei Oki:
  A timid man who participates in the Jack of Hearts game with Chishiya
- Akane Sakanoue as Satomi Aoki:
  A woman who participates in the Jack of Hearts game with Chishiya
- Junichi Gamou as Hiroshi Tomita:
  A man who participates in the Jack of Hearts game with Chishiya
- Shiori Hashiba as Shinobu Furuta:
  A woman who participates in the Jack of Hearts game with Chishiya
- Yuenchi Kojima as Motohiko Kaneko:
  A man who participates in the Jack of Hearts game with Chishiya
- Seiichi Kohinata as Akifumi Seto:
  A man who participates in the Jack of Hearts game with Chishiya
- Ryûhei Watabe as Genki Kiriu:
  A man who participates in the Jack of Hearts game with Chishiya
- Takumi Matsuzawa as Kaito Kameyama:
  A man who documents the games and their psychological effects on players, aiming to uncover the truth behind the Borderland.
- Ayumi Tanida as Isao Shirabi:
  The King of Spades, whose game involves him shooting players on sight. Before arriving in the Borderland, he was a mercenary.
- Chihiro Yamamoto as Risa:
  A highly athletic woman who is the Queen of Spades and the main opponent in the game "Checkmate".
- Jun Hashimoto as Benzo Yashige:
  A man who participates in the King of Diamonds game with Chishiya.
- Aimi Satsukawa as Hinako Daimon:
  A woman who participates in the King of Diamonds game with Chishiya.
- Wakato Kanematsu as Takashi Asuma:
  A man who participates in the King of Diamonds game with Chishiya.
- Miyu Yagyu as Nozomi:
  A woman who befriends Usagi and a child, Kota.
- Ruse Ota as Kota
- Jun Matsuo as Yuzuru
- Daichi Yamaguchi as Kazuki

==== Season 3 ====
- Joey Iwanaga as Sōta Itsuki:
  Yuna's older brother; a player and former Borderland survivor who allies with Usagi's team in the Joker games.
- Akana Ikeda as Yuna Itsuki:
  Sōta's younger sister; a player and former Borderland survivor who allies with Usagi's team in the Joker games.
- Hiroyuki Ikeuchi as "Kazuya":
  A yakuza and former Borderland survivor who allies with Arisu's team in the Joker games. His real name is never revealed.
- Hyunri as Shion:
  A Borderland survivor who allies with Arisu's team in the Joker games.
- Sakura Kiryu as Natsu:
  A Borderland survivor who allies with Arisu's team in the Joker games.
- Ken Watanabe as the Watchman:
  The intermediator who oversees the Borderland
- Yugo Mikawa as Masato:
  A Borderland survivor who allies with Arisu's team in the Joker games.
- Motoki Ochiai as Ikeno:
  A Borderland survivor who briefly allies with Usagi's team, before taking control of a game with more violent approach than Usagi's.
- Rinako Isobe as Himari:
  A Borderland survivor and a friend of Juri who allies with Usagi's team in the Joker games.
- Kanro Morita as Taro:
  A train enthusiast and Borderland survivor who allies with Usagi's team in the Joker games.
- Nau Nanba as Juri:
  A Borderland survivor and a friend of Himari who allies with Usagi's team in the Joker games.
- Kokoa Naka as Yano
- Yûtaro Goto as Mano
- Alice Ayano as Yukiko
- Hiroto Takahashi as Ken
- Kenzo Fukutsu as Sachiko's son

== Episodes ==
| Season | Episodes | Originally released |
|---|---|---|
| 1 | 8 | December 10, 2020 |
| 2 | 8 | December 22, 2022 |
| 3 | 6 | September 25, 2025 |

=== Season 1 (2020) ===
| No. overall | Episode | Directed by | Written by | Original release date |
|---|---|---|---|---|
| 1 | Episode 1 | Shinsuke Sato | Yoshiki Watabe, Yasuko Kuramitsu, & Shinsuke Sato | December 10, 2020 |
In Tokyo, jobless and video game-obsessed Arisu hangs out with his friends Chōta and Karube. After causing a disturbance in Shibuya Crossing, the three hide from police in the station bathroom and reemerge to find the city deserted. At night, they follow a billboard's instructions to a "game arena", where they find a stack of phones displaying the game's difficulty level, indicated by a playing card. They are joined by a high school girl and a businesswoman named Shibuki, who warns them that once a player enters an arena, they cannot leave, as a laser will kill them if they try. In this three-of-clubs difficulty game, titled "Dead or Alive", the group must enter one of two doors within a time limit: one leads to another room with the same choice, while the other leads to certain death. The original trio and Shibuki survive, but Chōta is badly burned. Outside, they are each given "visas" that must be extended through continued play, or they will expire, resulting in execution.
| 2 | Episode 2 | Shinsuke Sato | Yoshiki Watabe, Yasuko Kuramitsu, & Shinsuke Sato | December 10, 2020 |
With no way to escape the abandoned city, Arisu and Karube decide to play another game to extend their visas, leaving Shibuki to tend to the injured Chōta. They find a new game arena in an apartment complex and meet several players, including the agile Usagi, the friendly Tatta, the gruff Aguni, and the sly, mysterious Chishiya. Arisu also learns the meaning of each card: spades represent physical games, clubs are team-based, diamonds involve wits and intellect, and hearts focus on trust and betrayal. In the five-of-spades game titled "Tag", players must evade two armed attackers while searching for a room containing two buttons that must be pressed simultaneously to stop a bomb from detonating. Arisu, Karube, Chishiya, and Usagi work together to find the room and win, though Arisu later feels guilty when the attackers are executed. Karube discovers a radio message instructing them to return to the "Beach".
| 3 | Episode 3 | Shinsuke Sato | Yoshiki Watabe, Yasuko Kuramitsu, & Shinsuke Sato | December 10, 2020 |
Karube tells the group about the radio message. To extend Shibuki and Chōta's visas, they head to a game arena in a botanical garden, where they enter a seven-of-hearts difficulty game titled "Hide-and-seek" as the only participants; they soon learn that only one can survive. Equipped with facial recognition headsets, they are assigned animal identities, with three players as "sheep" and one as the "wolf". Players switch animals whenever they make eye contact, with the wolf ultimately winning and the sheep dying. After a long struggle, Arisu becomes the wolf and searches for his friends, who have decided to sacrifice themselves for him. They communicate via the headsets, spending their final moments saying goodbye; Arisu watches in horror as they are killed.
| 4 | Episode 4 | Shinsuke Sato | Yoshiki Watabe, Yasuko Kuramitsu, & Shinsuke Sato | December 10, 2020 |
In a flashback, Usagi is devastated after her mountaineer father commits suicide following public doubt about his Everest climb. In the present, she finds a despondent Arisu and decides to help him. They enter a game arena inside a bus in an underpass and are joined by three other players. For the four-of-clubs game titled "Distance", they are told only to "reach the goal". Believing the goal is at the end of the tunnel, Arisu, Usagi, and two others run toward it, leaving behind a player with a sprained leg. Midway, they are attacked by a panther, which kills one player. At the tunnel's end, Arisu runs to save the injured player, planning to return on a motorbike. However, upon reaching the bus, he notices it has the word "goal" written on it, realizing they had been running away from the goal. Water begins flooding the underpass from the tunnel's end, and while the other player is killed, Usagi reaches the bus and survives with Arisu and the injured player.
| 5 | Episode 5 | Shinsuke Sato | Yoshiki Watabe, Yasuko Kuramitsu, & Shinsuke Sato | December 10, 2020 |
Arisu and Usagi, searching for the "Beach", secretly follow a group of players with similar wrist tags to a resort filled with players. They are captured and brought before the leader, Hatter, who confirms they have arrived at the "Beach". Hatter explains that their mission is to collect all the playing cards, which they believe will allow them to leave the city once complete, though the face cards have not yet appeared. Arisu and Usagi are assigned to join groups of players to collect the remaining cards. Arisu's group includes the Beach executive Ann, Chishiya's associate Kuina, and Tatta, now the Beach's mechanic. Despite deducing the answer herself, Ann has Arisu solve the logic puzzle as a test, to see his potential. Later, Hatter reveals to a group of Beach executive members, now including Arisu, that the only remaining number card is the ten of hearts.
| 6 | Episode 6 | Shinsuke Sato | Yoshiki Watabe, Yasuko Kuramitsu, & Shinsuke Sato | December 10, 2020 |
To extend his visa, Hatter leaves to complete a game but is brought back to the Beach dead, with his henchmen claiming he died during the game. Niragi, a vicious Beach militant, forces the executives to vote Aguni in as the new leader, and Aguni receives the code to a safe containing the collected cards. Chishiya decodes the safe and convinces Arisu and Usagi to help him and Kuina steal the deck. However, it is revealed to have been a ruse for Chishiya to find the real safe, and Arisu is caught. Niragi confines Arisu to ensure he dies when his visa expires and torments Usagi, intending to rape her. Chishiya retrieves the cards from the real safe. He and Kuina try to flee with the deck but are stopped as a wall of lasers rises around the Beach to prevent anyone from leaving. An announcement summons all players to the lobby, revealing the Beach to be the arena for a "Witch Hunt" game, with the difficulty marked ten of hearts.
| 7 | Episode 7 | Shinsuke Sato | Yoshiki Watabe, Yasuko Kuramitsu, & Shinsuke Sato | December 10, 2020 |
A girl named Momoka is found stabbed to death, and the players are tasked with identifying the "witch" who murdered her and throwing them onto a bonfire to win. With only two hours to identify the killer, Aguni and his militants decide to kill everyone to collect the last card. As dozens are murdered, Usagi teams up with Tatta, his friend Joe, and Momoka's best friend Asahi to rescue Arisu. They successfully free him, although Joe is killed in the process. Ann discovers that Hatter was murdered and searches for fingerprints on Momoka's body. The resort is set on fire, Kuina kills the dangerous militant known as the Last Boss, and Chishiya severely injures Niragi. After assessing the game's events, Arisu identifies the witch; Ann also learns the witch's identity but is knocked unconscious by Aguni's militants.
| 8 | Episode 8 | Shinsuke Sato | Yoshiki Watabe, Yasuko Kuramitsu, & Shinsuke Sato | December 10, 2020 |
In a flashback, Momoka and Asahi wander through the empty city, the latter recording videos on a cellphone. In the present, Arisu confronts Aguni who, believing he is the "witch", confesses to shooting Hatter in self-defense. Arisu reveals the real witch to be Momoka, who killed herself. As Aguni engages Niragi, who still intends to kill everyone, the remaining players throw Momoka onto the bonfire, ending the game. Chishiya collects the final card. The next day, Arisu and Usagi watch videos recorded by Asahi, who had sacrificed herself during the game. In the videos, Asahi and Momoka reveal they are "dealers", players who organize games to extend their visas. One video shows them descending into an underground lair for "gamemasters". Arisu, Usagi, Chishiya, and Kuina locate the lair, only to find the "gamemasters" dead, and learn they were also players. Mira, one of the Beach's executives, appears on screens around the city and introduces new games to collect face cards. The four wait for the king of spades game to begin in Shibuya Crossing.

=== Season 2 (2022) ===
| No. overall | Episode | Directed by | Written by | Original release date |
|---|---|---|---|---|
| 9 | Episode 1 | Shinsuke Sato | Yasuko Kuramitsu & Shinsuke Sato | December 22, 2022 |
The game begins when a cloaked gunman begins shooting players indiscriminately. The game arena spans the entire city, with a blimp displaying the king-of-spades card trailing the gunman. Arisu theorizes that to return to the real world, they must collect all the face cards, as they did with the pip cards. Arisu, Usagi, Kuina, and Tatta hide together, while Chishiya and Ann flee separately. Usagi, still grieving her father's death, confesses to Arisu that she does not wish to return to the real world. To extend their visas, Arisu and the group enter the king-of-clubs game and are joined by a surviving Niragi. The King of Clubs, Kyuma, introduces himself and his team as the "citizens of the country".
| 10 | Episode 2 | Shinsuke Sato | Yasuko Kuramitsu & Shinsuke Sato | December 22, 2022 |
Flashbacks reveal that Kyuma and his team were a rock band before the games. In the present, Kyuma explains that all face-card games are death matches against the respective card's citizens. The king of clubs game, titled "Osmosis", involves players obtaining points via "battling" (touching an opponent, with the higher-scoring player taking 500 points), touching designated "items" scattered in shipping containers, and touching the opposing team's base—unless blocked by a defender. The team with the most points by two hours wins. Arisu's team initially takes the lead but is caught off guard by Kyuma's team's fearlessness and willingness to sacrifice themselves. As Kyuma's team takes a 500-point lead, Arisu desperately searches for more points while Niragi, feeling hopeless, attacks Usagi.
| 11 | Episode 3 | Shinsuke Sato | Yasuko Kuramitsu & Shinsuke Sato | December 22, 2022 |
Kyuma and Arisu, who have come to understand each other, talk as the countdown nears its end. Arisu realizes that Kyuma and his team were once regular players and fears this means that clearing the games will not allow them to return home. He then asks to shake Kyuma's hand, causing Kyuma to lose points and shifting the lead to Arisu's team. It is revealed that Tatta mangled his hand to pull off his points bracelet and transfer it to Arisu, allowing him to win one final battle. Kyuma and his team peacefully accept their deaths, while Tatta dies from his injuries. Niragi leaves the group. Elsewhere, Chishiya participates in the jack-of-hearts game "Solitary Confinement" in a prison, in which players must correctly guess the playing card suit displayed on the back of their immovable collars with others' help to avoid execution, while identifying and defeating the Jack of Hearts, who is secretly one of them.
| 12 | Episode 4 | Shinsuke Sato | Yasuko Kuramitsu & Shinsuke Sato | December 22, 2022 |
Chishiya and two other players—a serial killer and a con man—identify the Jack of Hearts, Enji. Chishiya leaves while the two plan to torture Enji for information, but Enji commits suicide, ending the game. Kuina leaves Arisu and Usagi to search for Ann and Chishiya. Hopeless, Arisu speculates that since all citizens were once players, clearing the games might only lead to becoming one of them. He and Usagi discover a slaughtered community outside Tokyo, attacked by the King of Spades, and watch a recording where a woman reveals the "fireworks" seen before their arrival were not fireworks. They are ambushed by the King of Spades, forcing them to split up. Arisu is saved by Aguni and a woman named Heiya.
| 13 | Episode 5 | Shinsuke Sato | Yasuko Kuramitsu & Shinsuke Sato | December 22, 2022 |
In a flashback, Heiya is the sole survivor of her first game, the seven-of-spades "Boiling Death", losing her leg in the process. In the present, Arisu teams up with Aguni and Heiya to ambush the King of Spades, but their plan fails and he is separated from them. Ann hikes beyond the city, only to find it enclosed by mountains. Kuina survives the jack-of-spades game by besting everyone in combat but struggles alone. Usagi helps a young boy whose visa is expiring by accompanying him in the queen-of-spades game, which Arisu also enters, and the two reunite. The game, "Checkmate", requires players to tag opponents to switch them to their team, with victory going to the team with the most members at the end. Usagi's team begins to lose as more players decide to stay with the Queen of Spades.
| 14 | Episode 6 | Shinsuke Sato | Yasuko Kuramitsu & Shinsuke Sato | December 22, 2022 |
Usagi confronts the opposing players, questioning if they truly prefer to remain in the games rather than hold out for a chance to return home and start over. Her words persuade them to cooperate against the Queen of Spades, and they win the game. Afterward, Arisu and Usagi find a hot spring in the ruins of a stadium, where they bathe and share a kiss. Meanwhile, Chishiya and three others enter "Balance Scale", a mathematics-based logic game against Kuzuryu, the King of Diamonds and former Beach executive. Chishiya realizes that Kuzuryu, a former lawyer, has been grappling with the question of whether all lives hold equal value. To test him, he gives Kuzuryu the chance to kill him, but Kuzuryu ultimately decides to let Chishiya win.
| 15 | Episode 7 | Shinsuke Sato | Yasuko Kuramitsu & Shinsuke Sato | December 22, 2022 |
Kuina and Ann reunite in the queen-of-clubs game and survive together. With only two face-card games left to clear, players begin to gather in Shibuya. Niragi forces Arisu and Chishiya into a gunfight, during which Arisu shoots Niragi, and Chishiya is wounded while saving Usagi. The King of Spades arrives. While Arisu sets a trap, Usagi, Kuina, Ann, Aguni, and Heiya fight the King of Spades but are ultimately overpowered. Aguni and Arisu finally disable him with an explosive, with Aguni delivering the final shot. With their allies gravely injured, Arisu and Usagi proceed to the final game—the queen-of-hearts.
| 16 | Episode 8 | Shinsuke Sato | Yasuko Kuramitsu & Shinsuke Sato | December 22, 2022 |
Mira reveals herself to be the Queen of Hearts, and her game, "Croquet", only requires Arisu to complete three rounds without quitting, regardless of the outcome. Mira reveals that she designed the previous "Hide and Seek" game to provoke Arisu, who restrains himself upon realizing that killing Mira would prevent the game from ending. Mira continues to psychologically manipulate Arisu, causing him to hallucinate that he is in a mental hospital, with her as his psychiatrist convincing him to quit. Usagi snaps him out of the illusion by slitting her wrist. Moved by their love, Mira concludes the final round and is executed. After the game, all surviving players are given a choice: become "permanent residents" or simply decline the offer. Those who refuse later wake up in a hospital as survivors of a meteorite impact, with no memory of the Borderland. Arisu and Usagi meet at a vending machine and walk together, while a joker card appears on a table.

=== Season 3 (2025) ===
| No. overall | Episode | Directed by | Written by | Original release date |
|---|---|---|---|---|
| 17 | Episode 1 | Shinsuke Sato | Yasuko Kuramitsu & Shinsuke Sato | September 25, 2025 |
Five years after the meteorite strike, Arisu is interviewed by Professor Ryuji Matsuyama, who is fascinated with the afterlife and is investigating the Borderland's existence. Arisu and Usagi have since married, but Usagi is haunted by recurring dreams of her late father. Ryuji's investigation leads him to a secret "game seminar", where the winner of an Old Maid game will undergo a controlled near-death experience while the losers die by electrocution. He wins and meets Banda, a citizen of the Borderland, who transports him there. Arisu is approached by Ann, who still remembers the Borderland. Usagi has a déjà vu about the Beach massacre. (Note: As depicted in season one, episode 7 (2020).) She calls Arisu but then disappears. He later finds her unconscious in a hospital, along with Ryuji, who is comatose; Usagi is revealed to be pregnant. Banda appears to Arisu and warns him that his memories of the Borderland will return along with the games—with Usagi as one of the players. Arisu visits Ann, who reveals that he has only two minutes to save Usagi before her heart fails. She injects him with a drug that induces cardiac arrest, sending his consciousness to the site of the first new game inside a temple.
| 18 | Episode 2 | Shinsuke Sato | Yasuko Kuramitsu & Shinsuke Sato | September 25, 2025 |
Arisu joins a group of players for the ten-round game "Fortunes", in which a different player must draw a fortune containing a riddle or mathematical question each round; incorrect answers trigger a trap that fires flaming arrows at the group. Arisu, whose memories have returned, answers incorrectly during his turn but uses clues from the previous fortunes to lead the remaining survivors to safety. The group realizes that they have all been in the Borderland and deduce that they now have to defeat the Joker. They agree to work as a team when they join other players for the "Zombie Hunt" game, where a small number of assigned "zombies" must "infect" the rest of the players to win, while the humans try to avoid and identify them. Rei, an outsider, proposes a trust-based strategy to prevent infection, but many players reject her plan and instead choose to kill those they suspect of being zombies.
| 19 | Episode 3 | Shinsuke Sato | Yasuko Kuramitsu & Shinsuke Sato | September 25, 2025 |
Arisu is revealed to have been one of the original zombies, and he has been secretly infecting his allies, ensuring a majority zombie win. Rei joins Arisu's group as they travel to the next game arena. Elsewhere in the Borderland, Usagi and Ryuji win a game together. Ryuji, knowing that Usagi is haunted by her father's death, invited her to join him as part of a secret deal with Banda. The pair join others for "Runaway Train", where players have to make their way through the cars of a train, each of which might be filled with nerve gas, with the choice to wear a gas mask with limited oxygen cartridges. With three cars and two cartridges left, Usagi decides to wear her mask, but her guess is wrong.
| 20 | Episode 4 | Shinsuke Sato | Yasuko Kuramitsu & Shinsuke Sato | September 25, 2025 |
Using the knowledge of a train hobbyist player, Usagi leads Ryuji and others to jump off their train to a train with their players dead. She spots Arisu playing the same game on another train, but the pair are unable to reunite. Ryuji tells Usagi that he caused the death of his student who was as obsessed with death as he is, when their experiment to simulate a near-death experience with a drug went wrong. For the semifinals, Usagi and her team clear "Tokyo Bingo Tower", which requires climbing Tokyo Tower, while Arisu and his team clear "Kick the Can" with exploding cans, although three of them are killed. Ryuji meets with Banda, who tells him to kill Usagi in the final game, which he believes will make Arisu choose to stay in the Borderland as a citizen.
| 21 | Episode 5 | Shinsuke Sato | Yasuko Kuramitsu & Shinsuke Sato | September 25, 2025 |
Arisu and his team enter the final arena by following projections of their possible future lives, and Arisu reunites with Usagi. The final game is "Future Sugoroku", where the players are inside a labyrinth of rooms and have to find the exit, with dice rolls deciding the number of people allowed through each door. The players all wear bracelets with points, which are deducted depending on the chosen room. Usagi's unborn child is included as the tenth player of the game, and she is given a second bracelet. The walls project images of the players' potential futures, either good or bad, which emotionally influence them in choosing which door to go through. Arisu tries to direct the players when they have to split up, but Ryuji encourages them to spread out to find the exit faster, while others decide to go on their own. Tetsu dies after an emotional Nobu does not enter a room depicting a possible death for his mother, whilst Sota only removes points from his own bracelet to protect Yuna. Thus, when he and Yuna are forcibly separated, he dies in front of a projection of her wedding. The remaining eight players deduce the location of the room with the exit door but realize they do not have enough points to ensure everyone's survival.
| 22 | Episode 6 | Shinsuke Sato | Yasuko Kuramitsu & Shinsuke Sato | September 25, 2025 |
Arisu successfully guides everyone to the exit, but only seven can leave, so he sacrifices himself by staying behind. Ryuji attempts to shoot Usagi but ultimately cannot go through with it. Arisu is told that he is the winner, and he is met by Banda, who reveals that the new games were his plan to convince him to become a Borderland citizen. Arisu rejects him and escapes to help Usagi and the others when the Borderland starts falling apart. Banda is about to shoot Arisu, just when he is killed by a game laser. A Watchman reveals himself and tells Arisu that the Joker is merely a symbol of the in-between, and as such, he merely watches over the Borderland, a place "between life and death". The Watchman says that a bigger catastrophe than the Shibuya meteor is coming and asks Arisu to make a choice. Arisu chooses to live and saves Usagi. He wakes up in the real world and rushes to Usagi's side as she wakes up in the hospital. Some time later, Arisu and Usagi are expecting their baby and Arisu becomes a therapist.

== Production ==
=== Development ===
On July 16, 2019, Netflix announced that they were creating a live-action adaptation of the manga Alice in Borderland, with Yoshiki Watabe, Yasuko Kuramitsu, and Shinsuke Sato writing the scripts for each episode, and Sato directing in an attempt to make the show appear as "one very, very long film". A few months later, on August 4, Kento Yamazaki and Tao Tsuchiya were cast as the main characters of the series, with the pair appearing as Ryōhei Arisu and Yuzuha Usagi, respectively.

=== Filming ===
Keita Machida, Yûki Morinaga, and Kento Yamazaki at the Ashikaga Scramble City Studio, a large replica of the popular Shibuya Crossing

Filming for the series began as early as August 2019, when Yamazaki was spotted during filming in Dōgenzaka, a district of Shibuya on August 8. The following day, crew members were spotted near a store in Fukutomi-cho, located in the city of Yokohama. From September 17 to 20, Yamazaki and Tsuchiya were seen filming in an apartment complex in front of Kita-Suzurandai Station, on the Shintetsu Arima Line, in the city of Kobe. According to the production company Robot Communications, the show's script was revised to "match the building layout". A scene from the first episode featuring Yamazaki's character, Arisu, meeting his friends Chōta and Karube near Tokyo's busy Shibuya Crossing, was originally supposed to be filmed inside a Starbucks. However, due to the complexity of a glass-covered set, the scene took place in front of a sign outside Shibuya Station. Furthermore, a scene taking place inside Shibuya Station, in which the main characters enter a bathroom and reemerge to an empty Tokyo, was shot in a four-minute continuous take. Extras were recruited for the series from August 9 to December 11, in various cities. The creator of the manga the series is based on, Haro Aso, was allowed to visit various sets. Filming took place in several cities and concluded in December 2019.

Filming for the second season wrapped in March 2022.

=== Visual effects ===
During filming, scenes focusing on the empty city of Tokyo were primarily shot using special effects and green screens, with Sato explaining that with the help of his assistant director, he would run into the middle of the intersection of Shibuya Crossing with a small camera "to figure out which parts to actually build and which parts to CGI". Using the Ashikaga Scramble City Studio, a large set 100 kilometers from Tokyo constructed for the series and the film Detective Chinatown 3 (which was filmed during the same period), scenes featuring Shibuya Crossing were filmed using mainly green screens, with "everything but the road and the ticket gate at the east entrance [being] produced with computer graphics". To keep the scenes "authentic", visual effects director Atsushi Doi recreated the shadows of the Tokyu Building where they would normally fall. A scene in episode 4, which showed an underpass being flooded with water, was created with the help of previsualizations, allowing the crew to "experiment with different elements before the actual shoot". The panther that appears in that same episode was created using visual effects developed after the crew visited multiple zoos. Additionally, Academy Award winner Erik-Jan de Boer supervised the production of the tiger featured in episode 5, which was created by Anibrain, an animation studio in India. Post-credit visual effects were added in with the help of Japan's Digital Frontier, who worked alongside teams from Singapore, the United States, and India in an international collaboration.

=== Music ===
The score for Alice in Borderland was composed entirely by Yutaka Yamada, who had previously worked with Sato on Bleach (2018) and Kingdom (2019). Produced by Kohei Chida, the music was performed by the FILMharmonic Orchestra of Prague. The song "Good Times", by Jan Erik Nilsson, was featured various times throughout the show.

== Marketing and release ==
On September 18, 2020, Netflix released a teaser video revealing that Alice in Borderland would debut in 190 countries on the platform on December 10, 2020. On October 24, 2020, six set images were released to promote the series. Four days later, an official trailer was issued, along with a poster and a list of the main cast. According to various critics, the first season of Alice in Borderland covered 31 chapters of the original manga, leaving 33 untouched. The first season came out on December 10, and in its first few weeks, it "ranked in the top ten most-watched shows" on the platform in nearly 40 territories, including in Malaysia, Hong Kong, the Philippines, Singapore, Taiwan, Thailand, and Vietnam. Overall, the series did better in countries located in Asia and Europe than those in North America. On December 24, 2020, Netflix renewed the series for a second season, two weeks after the first one had been released.

On October 7, 2020, Haro Aso, the creator of the original manga the series is based on, announced plans to "celebrate" and promote the Netflix series by introducing a new manga, titled Alice in Borderland Retry on Weekly Shōnen Sunday. Launched on October 14 (#46, 2020 of Weekly Shōnen Sunday), the first volume of the manga tankobon was shipped out on December 11, one day after Alice in Borderland premiered. The manga series ended on January 20, 2021 (#8, 2021 of the magazine). The second and final volume of tankobon was released on February 18, 2021. The second season of Alice in Borderland premiered worldwide on December 22, 2022.

On September 27, 2023, the series was renewed for a third season. In July 2025, Netflix announced that it would come out on September 25, 2025, and released a teaser trailer. In a January 2026 article, Netflix stated that the third season was the show's final.

== Reception ==
Critical response of Alice in Borderland
| Season | Rotten Tomatoes | Metacritic |
|---|---|---|
| 1 | 82% (11 reviews) | TBD |
| 2 | 91% (11 reviews) | TBD |
| 3 | 63% (8 reviews) | TBD |

Following its release, Alice in Borderland received mostly positive reviews from critics, who applauded its cinematography, editing, use of graphic violence, visuals, and the performances of Kento Yamazaki and Tao Tsuchiya, but left mixed opinions on its advancement without special focus on character development and its story in general, particularly in the second half. On review aggregator Rotten Tomatoes, the first season of the show holds an approval rating of 82%, based on ten reviews, with an average rating of 6.8/10. A month after its release, the first season had accumulated 18 million households in viewership. On Rotten Tomatoes, the second season of Alice in Borderland holds an approval rating of 91%, based on nine reviews, with an average rating of 7.1/10.

From The Japan Times, James Hadfield gave praise to Sato's directing but criticized the characters, stating that "few of the cast leave much impression, though Tsuchiya makes for an effective action heroine, and Nijirô Murakami has some fun as a smirking loner." Writing for Ready Steady Cut, Jonathon Wilson gave a generally positive review, lauding the series for skipping over "exposition and careful backstory-building" and "just getting straight to it". Wilson also compared the series positively to the Japanese film Battle Royale and the American horror film Saw. Ars Technica journalist Jennifer Ouellette called the show "emotionally intense" and compared its games to those found in the books Ready Player One and Lord of the Flies, and the 1997 film Cube. Salon's Melanie McFarland compared the series to the CBS All Access miniseries The Stand, stating that Alice in Borderland "handles the mechanics of introducing its characters more effectively and it doesn't throw off the audience by leaning heavily on flashbacks [...] but unlike "The Stand," the "before" profiles aren't extensive to the point of dragging on the story's progress." From Yahoo! News, Lim Yian Lu highly praised the series for its "suspenseful plot", stating that it "will keep you entertained and yearning for more despite its grisly and gory scenes." Writing for the Anime News Network, Theron Martin gave the series a C+ and accorded mixed feedback to the show's production, score, general storyline, and acting, while stating that it gives a "modest amount of entertainment" for its runtime. After watching the first episode and praising it for its tone, soundtrack, and ability to "shift gears so fast", the crew at Decider recommended viewers to stream the show.

== Awards and nominations ==
| Year | Award | Category | Recipient | Result | Ref. |
|---|---|---|---|---|---|
| 2021 | 3rd Asia Contents Awards | Best Creative | Alice in Borderland | Nominated | |
| 2021 | 3rd Asia Contents Awards | Creative Beyond Border | Alice in Borderland | Won | |
| 2021 | 3rd Asia Contents Awards | Best OTT original | Alice in Borderland | Nominated | |
| 2021 | 3rd Asia Contents Awards | Technical Achievement | Alice in Borderland | Nominated | |
| 2021 | 3rd Asia Contents Awards | Best Actress | Tao Tsuchiya | Nominated | |
| 2021 | Asian Academy Creative Awards | Best Cinematography | Taro Kawazu | Won | |
| 2021 | Asian Academy Creative Awards | Best Visual or Special VFX in TV Series or Feature Film | Alice in Borderland | Won | |
| 2021 | Asian Academy Creative Awards | Best Direction (Fiction) | Shinsuke Sato | Won | |
| 2026 | 31st Asian Television Awards | Best Actress in a Leading Role | Tao Tsuchiya | Won | |
| 2026 | 31st Asian Television Awards | Best Cinematography (Drama) | Taro Kawazu | Won | |
