= Hyde & Closer =

Japanese manga series by Haro Aso

- First tankōbon volume cover, featuring Hyde (left) and Closer Shunpei

呪法解禁!!ハイド&クローサー (Juhou Kaikin!! Haido & Kuroosaa)
- Genre: Adventure; Comedy; Fantasy
- Manga
- Written by: Haro Aso
- Published by: Shogakukan
- English publisher: NA: Viz Media
- Imprint: Shōnen Sunday Comics
- Magazine: Weekly Shōnen Sunday (December 2007 – December 2008); Club Sunday (December 2008 – July 2009)
- Original run: December 26, 2007 – July 3, 2009
- Volumes: 7
- icon

Hyde & Closer (Japanese: 呪法解禁!!ハイド&クローサー, Hepburn: Juhou Kaikin!! Haido ando Kurōsā; 'Magic Ban Removal!! Hyde & Closer') is a Japanese manga series written and illustrated by Haro Aso. It was serialized in Shogakukan's shōnen manga magazine Weekly Shōnen Sunday from December 2007 to December 2008, and later on the Club Sunday website from December 2008 to July 2009. Its chapters were collected in seven tankōbon volumes. In North America, the series was licensed for English release by Viz Media, who serialized it online at Shonen Sunday and later released its volumes in print.

== Plot ==
Shunpei Closer, a timid 13-year-old boy, is the grandson of Alsyd Closer, a powerful magician known as the "Sorcerer King". On his seventh birthday, Alsyd gifted Shunpei a sentient teddy bear named Hyde. Six years later, Hyde awakens to protect Shunpei from a magical attack, revealing the boy is targeted by magicians worldwide. Initially frightened, Shunpei overcomes his fear to assist Hyde in battle, unlocking the bear's hidden weapon—the Texas Chainsaw. Through subsequent conflicts, Shunpei discovers his magical heritage, learns of the powerful group "The Six" pursuing him, and uncovers the truth about his grandfather's disappearance and the mysterious "Watcher in the Window".

== Characters ==
=== Main characters ===
Closer Shunpei (黒兎 春瓶, Shunpei Kurōzā)
Shunpei is a timid 13-year-old boy characterized by spiky black hair, blue eyes, and a necklace containing a bicolored magatama. Frequently belittled by classmates for his clumsiness and unremarkable nature, his life changes when he discovers magical abilities and meets Hyde, who becomes his mentor. Initially lacking self-confidence, Shunpei gradually develops his magical potential, with Hyde recognizing his latent talent. Through subsequent experiences, he demonstrates growing courage and skill, including strategically assisting Hyde in combat situations and eventually mastering magical items independently during confrontations with adversaries.
Hyde (ハイド, Haido)
Hyde is a magical teddy bear who protects Shunpei, his young owner. Normally inanimate, he activates when danger threatens, wielding a large chainsaw called "Texas Chainsaw" from a back compartment. Hyde mentors Shunpei, helping him overcome self-doubt. His magic power is unusually limited for a magical doll. The bear's past reveals he originally belonged to a boy named Marco 70 years earlier, surviving an air raid that killed his first owner before being enchanted by Alsyd to protect Shunpei. Hyde retains memories of Marco despite being inanimate at the time.
Uryuu Tatsumi (雨竜 巽, Tatsumi Uryū) and
A girl in Shunpei's class. She is a huge fan of a TV drama with an incredible manly male lead. She at first dislikes Shunpei due to his cowardice, until they are attacked by a curse user after school when it is their turn to clean the classroom. Tatsumi fell in love with Hyde after the incident, much to Shunpei's shock. But as time passes by, her feelings start to shift towards Shunpei.
Sōsuke Shindou (神藤 颯介, Shindō Sōsuke) and Tomiko (トミコ)
Shindou, the school's soccer star, secretly wields magic through his sentient doll Tomiko. Unlike conventional magic-users, he fights alongside Tomiko to maximize her power. His wealthy upbringing left him isolated, with only Tomiko as companionship. Initially opposing Shunpei, he later joins forces with him.
Tomiko is a sentient family heirloom doll romantically involved with Shindou, who seeks to make her human using Shunpei's blood. Modeled after an unmarried ancestor, her unnatural relationship with Shindou disturbs Shunpei.
Ana Maria Monsalvaltge (アナ・M・モンサルバジュ, Ana Maria Monsarubaju) and Shakka-Shakka Mekki (シャカシャカメッキー)
Ana initially seeks to obtain Closer's power through mistaken means. Her childhood involved frequent bullying due to her height until she befriended her tormentors with help from Bosh, a hippie-like mentor. After Bosh's murder by an unknown assailant, Ana vows to grow stronger for revenge, motivating her pursuit of Closer's abilities. Though initially antagonistic, she eventually allies with Shunpei's group. Her companion doll, Shakka-Shakka Mekki (named for its signature maracas), activates various abilities when Ana plays specific music tracks from her boombox.
Kazan (カザン) and Desmond (デズモンド, Dezumondo)
Kazan, a reformed criminal called "Holy Father", fights recklessly with his partner Desmond, a four-eyed tinplate doll. Desmond animates objects by firing spring projectiles that can also function as weapons. Though disliking chaos, Desmond tolerates Kazan's impulsive nature.
Closer Alsyd (アルシド・クローサー, Arushido Kurōzā)
Shunpei's grandfather, a legendary magician who gifted Hyde to him, travels the world demonstrating real magic disguised as simple tricks. His philosophy emphasizes self-determination. After disappearing, magic users seeking his power now target Shunpei for his inherited bloodline.
Pacqwa Suno-allichi (パクワ・スノアリッチ, Pakuwa Sunoaritchi)
A girl who has two shades of hair; black and white. She wears a hat with a pumpkin face smile on the side, a one-piece dress, a long trench coat, and black boots. Pacqwa owns a small store in the Unknown Bazaar, and although she displays many items, most of the items she sells get refunded. She started her magic-device store because of her father, who was a world famous magical item seller. She apologizes frequently.

=== Enemy Curse users ===
Antonio (アントニオ) and Chamokey (チャモキー, Chamokī)
Antonio, posing as a delivery man, delivers the doll Chamokey to Shunpei. Chamokey reveals its intent to kill Shunpei, warning of perpetual danger. After Hyde destroys Chamokey, Antonio meets his demise through a series of misfortunes culminating in a bridge accident. Chamokey is a sadistic, fedora-wearing monkey doll with two mouths. Though it initially torments Shunpei with cutting weapons like boxcutters, its confidence shatters upon confronting Hyde.
Chilledski (チルドスキー, Chirudosukī) and Harawataski (ハラワタスキー, Harawatasukī)
Chilledski is a Russian curse user who wears a walrus skin coat despite Japan's climate. After his doll's destruction causes medical complications, Hyde recruits him by exploiting his post-surgical inability to laugh. Chilledski reveals there are 1,000 magic users targeting Closer, including "The Six" most powerful. Harawataski is a skull-shaped jack-in-the-box doll that feeds on human desire. It wields tongs and a crowbar, with a star-marked coin as its core.
Bugs (バグス, Bagusu) and Seyabdi (セヤブディ, Seyabudi)
A duo who attack Shunpei after school. Bugs takes control on the school's lights in order to give his doll the advantage. After failing to take Shunpei's life, Bugs is thrown in jail for assaulting a janitor and with Seyabdi destroyed he started feeling pain whenever someone steps on his shadow.
Seyabdi is a shadow puppet with a strange head that uses a knife in combat to strike the finishing blow.
Enrique (エンリケ, Enrike), Kefman (ケフマン, Kefuman) and Michellan (ミケラン, Mikeran)
Enrique is a young magician deceived by the Watcher into believing Closer's power could heal his sick mother. As the only magician capable of controlling two Curse Dolls simultaneously, he wields Kefman, a four-armed marionette clown with razor-sharp strings, and Michelan, a human-sized martial arts master puppet. After Shunpei saves him following the dolls' destruction, Enrique reveals crucial information about the Watcher.
Chi-Chi (吃吃) and Wamien (蛙麺, Wāmien)
A duo who attack Shunpei whilst he was training to use his newly acquired magical device. Chi-Chi is an overweight man who loves ramen. He wears a Chinese shirt and small dark glasses. He has a curly mustache and tattoos on his head that resemble three waves.
Wamien is a small, frog-like creature with a porcelain bowl on his head but transforms into a large, muscular reptilian creature when using his magic. Chi-Chi was later badly scalded by hot ramen after, Wamien's subsequent defeat.
Abumiya (鐙谷) and Lancy (ランシィ, Ranshī)
Abumiya and his doll Lancy form a duo targeting a church for Feng Shui-related destruction. Abumiya wears flamboyant business attire with yin-yang symbols tattooed on his eyes, displaying sadistic tendencies through his enthusiastic descriptions of magical cruelty. Despite this outward malevolence, he proves fundamentally cowardly when confronted, ultimately being buried under junkyard debris after Lancy's destruction. The doll Lancy resembles a floating jiang-shi with a bifurcated appearance - one half benignly reveals opponents' fortunes while the demonic counterpart discloses misfortunes.
Schubert (シュバルト, Shubaruto)
The president of Hyper Toy (ハイパートイ, Haipā Toi), a world famous toy company. Schubert commands 100 magicians to animate his products. Ruthlessly pragmatic, he disregards collateral damage in his pursuit to eliminate Closer. His unique curse transforms his entire toy store into weapons, though with limited control. When conventional methods fail, his magicians empower a single deer-costume doll, granting him superhuman abilities. After successive defeats by Hyde and psychological manipulation by Closer, a traumatic revelation surfaces—his true motivation was bringing joy to children. Hyde's final attack purges his corruption, leaving him mentally regressed to infancy.

=== Faction of The Watcher in the Window ===
The Watcher in the Window (窓辺の男, Madobe no Otoko)
The Watcher is a manipulative magic user who orchestrates attacks against Shunpei to lure out Closer. Appearing through transient floating windows, he deceives others into targeting Closer with false promises of power. His true objective is obtaining Resentment, an ancient magical vessel containing accumulated human negativity capable of destroying humanity. A former doctor driven to madness when a shamanistic tribe sacrificed his family, he is ultimately revealed to be the embodiment of "Detox", the only magical device that can counteract Resentment.
Punch (パンチ, Panchi)
A magical panda construct created by a vengeful 19th-century sorcerer, it serves the Watcher despite having achieved its revenge. Powered by its creator's heart, it attacks with scissor-wielding tentacles, obsessively destroying everything while screaming about cutting. During a school battle with Hyde, it merges some scissors into a chainsaw weapon before being ultimately destroyed, though its severed portion makes a final attack before deactivation.
Ashlev (アルシェブ, Arushebu) and Pterobone (プトロボン, Putorobon)
One of the Watcher's allies that willingly wants Resentment to be unleashed. He has a massive ego and fancies himself as a genius and an inventor (e.g. making a toothpaste sandwich for people to eat and clean their teeth at the same time). Pterobone is a living fossil that seems to combine aspects of a triceratops, a pterosaur, and a stegosaur. Aside from its magic, it can fly and split itself into its bones to create multiple attack chances. Pterobone is destroyed by Hyde, and because of the curse backlash, all of the joints in Alshev's body are dislocated and he is sent to the emergency room.
Ronove (ロノウェ, Ronōe)
A woman allied with the Watcher, she seeks to prevent the destruction of Resentment to satisfy her obsession with death. As a child, she was the lone survivor of a fire that killed a southern US cult. Raised by adoptive parents, she initially struggled to communicate until showing interest in flowers—only to secretly starve them for pleasure. This cruelty escalated to animals and eventually humans. As an adult, she craves global destruction to witness mass death. Alongside Asmodai, she confronts Shunpei and Shindou in a hospital, overpowering them until they exploit her wax-based physiology by dissolving her with caustic soda and alcohol.
Asmodai (アスモダイ, Asumodai)
Asmodai is a magician who murders Ana's mentor, Bosh, and allies with the Watcher to protect the destructive force called Resentment. Born under extraordinary circumstances, he used magic from the womb to kill fellow survivors in a tunnel collapse, angered by being excluded from their count. This prenatal violence foreshadowed his psychopathic nature. His sole motivation is witnessing global destruction, preferably caused by himself. During a zoo confrontation where his powers peak, he battles Ana and Kazan while expressing his desire to personally trigger the apocalypse.

== Publication ==
Written and illustrated by Haro Aso, Hyde & Closer debuted in Shogakukan's shōnen manga magazine Weekly Shōnen Sunday on December 26, 2007. It was serialized in the magazine until December 2008, when it was transferred to Shogakukan's Club Sunday website. The series finished on July 3, 2009. Shogakukan collected its chapters into seven tankōbon volumes, released from March 18, 2008, to August 18, 2009.

In North America, the manga was licensed for English release by Viz Media. The series was published online on its Shonen Sunday website in July 2009. The seven volumes were published between July 13, 2010, and January 10, 2012.

=== Volumes ===
No.	Original release date	Original ISBN	English release date	English ISBN
1	March 18, 2008	978-4-09-121295-5	July 13, 2010	978-1-4215-3424-4
2	June 18, 2008	978-4-09-121423-2	October 12, 2010	978-1-4215-3425-1
3	September 18, 2008	978-4-09-121466-9	January 11, 2011	978-1-4215-3426-8
4	December 18, 2008	978-4-09-121516-1	April 12, 2011	978-1-4215-3427-5
5	February 18, 2009	978-4-09-121600-7	July 12, 2011	978-1-4215-3492-3
6	May 18, 2009	978-4-09-122010-3	October 11, 2011	978-1-4215-3493-0
7	August 18, 2009	978-4-09-121720-2	October 11, 2011	978-1-4215-3495-4

== Reception ==
Corrina Lawson of Wired felt that the story was likely to be scary to young children, as toys attack the protagonists, but her sons (11 and 14) enjoyed the character of Hyde, who she described as "the teddy bear version of Nick Fury". Lawson also praised the "genuinely suspenseful" action sequences. Johanna Draper Carlson from Comics Worth reading felt that it was interesting having a boy learn to be a man from a teddy bear, but felt sad that a younger audience who could more appreciate these themes was excluded by the older teen rating of the title. Danica Davidson, writing for Otaku USA, felt the first volume was "tightly written and clever", and found the protagonist very sympathetic. The reviewer for Manga-News describes the beginning as being typical of shōnen, depicting a timid protagonist who gains confidence and the ability to protect himself, but felt there were many elements which made Hyde & Closer unique, including an effective graphical style which is dynamic, expressive, and original, and felt that the series would become more in-depth as the story progressed.
