= Haro Aso =

Japanese manga artist

Haro Aso 麻生羽呂
- Born: Osaka, Japan
- Area: Manga artist
- Notable works: Alice in Borderland; Zom 100: Bucket List of the Dead

Haro Aso (Japanese: 麻生羽呂, Hepburn: Asō Haro) is a Japanese manga artist. After his debut in 2005, he serialized Hyde & Closer from December 2007 to July 2009, and Alice in Borderland from November 2010 to March 2016. After retiring from illustrating, he did the story for Zom 100: Bucket List of the Dead in October 2018 and Noyu Girl in August 2021.

== Biography ==
Haro Aso was born in Osaka, Japan. He attended Kansai University, but later dropped out. He made his debut as a manga artist in 2005 with YUNGE!. On December 26, 2007, Aso launched Hyde & Closer. The series finished its serialization on July 3, 2009. Following Hyde & Closer's completion, Aso launched Alice in Borderland on November 25, 2010. The series concluded on March 2, 2016. At the time of the manga's conclusion, it had 1.3 million copies in circulation. The manga was also given two major adaptations, an original video animation series and a live-action television series. Following Alice in Borderland's completion, Aso intended to retire from drawing, though he came out of retirement to draw a spin-off after the television series' release.

Starting on October 19, 2018, Aso did the story of the manga series Zom 100: Bucket List of the Dead; Kotaro Takata did the illustrations. Starting on August 20, 2021, Aso did the story for another manga series, Noyu Girl; Shirō Yoshida did the illustrations.

== Works ==
- YUNGE! (one-shot published in Weekly Shōnen Sunday Cho) (2005)
- Hyde & Closer (呪法解禁!!ハイド&クローサー, Juhou Kaikin!! Haido ando Kurōsā) (serialized in Weekly Shōnen Sunday and Club Sunday) (2007–2009)
- Alice in Borderland (今際の国のアリス, Imawa no Kuni no Arisu) (serialized in Shōnen Sunday S and Weekly Shōnen Sunday) (2010–2016)
- Zom 100: Bucket List of the Dead (ゾン100 ～ゾンビになるまでにしたい100のこと～, Zon 100 ~ Zonbi ni Naru made ni Shitai 100 no Koto ~) (serialized in Monthly Sunday Gene-X; illustrated by Kotaro Takata) (2018–present)
- Noyu Girl (serialized in Yawaraka Spirits; illustrated by Shirō Yoshida) (2021–2022)
- Sex-chan (serialized in Comic Cmoa; written by Tatsunari Iota and illustrated by Mano Sakamoto) (2022)
