= Zom 100: Bucket List of the Dead =

Japanese manga series

- First tankōbon volume cover, featuring Akira Tendo (left) and Shizuka Mikazuki (right)

ゾン100〜ゾンビになるまでにしたい100のこと〜 (Zon Hyaku Zonbi ni Naru Made ni Shitai Hyaku no Koto)
- Genre: Comedy horror; Dystopian; Zombie apocalypse
- Manga
- Written by: Haro Aso
- Illustrated by: Kotaro Takata
- Published by: Shogakukan
- English publisher: NA: Viz Media; SG: Shogakukan Asia
- Imprint: Sunday GX Comics
- Magazine: Monthly Sunday Gene-X
- Original run: October 19, 2018 – present
- Volumes: 23
- Anime television series
- Directed by: Kazuki Kawagoe
- Produced by: Yuuki Hasegawa; Hiroshi Kamei; Junya Okamoto; Emi Satou; Emi Momiyama
- Written by: Hiroshi Seko
- Music by: Makoto Miyazaki
- Studio: Bug Films
- Licensed by: Viz Media: SA / SEA: Muse Communication
- Original network: JNN (MBS, TBS)
- English network: US: Adult Swim (Toonami)
- Original run: July 9, 2023 – December 26, 2023
- Episodes: 12
- Live-action film
- Directed by: Yusuke Ishida
- Produced by: Akira Morii
- Written by: Tatsuro Mishima
- Music by: Kohei Chida
- Studio: Robot Communications; Plus One Entertainment
- Licensed by: Netflix
- Released: August 3, 2023
- Runtime: 128 minutes
- icon

Zom 100: Bucket List of the Dead (Japanese: ゾン100〜ゾンビになるまでにしたい100のこと〜, Hepburn: Zon Hyaku Zonbi ni Naru Made ni Shitai Hyaku no Koto; 'Zom 100: 100 Things I Want to do Before Becoming a Zombie') is a Japanese manga series written by Haro Aso and illustrated by Kotaro Takata. It has been serialized in Shogakukan's seinen manga magazine Monthly Sunday Gene-X since October 2018, with its chapters collected in 23 tankōbon volumes as of August 2026. The series is licensed for English release in North America by Viz Media and in Southeast Asia by Shogakukan Asia.

An anime television series adaptation produced by Bug Films aired from July to December 2023. It is licensed by Viz Media outside of Asia. Muse Communication licensed the anime for South Asia and Southeast Asia regions. A live-action film adaptation premiered on Netflix in August 2023.

== Plot ==
Akira Tendo, a 24-year-old office worker of an extremely exploitative marketing firm, discovers himself trapped in a routine and meaningless life. He lacks drive and motivation after three years of abusive treatment. When a zombie apocalypse unexpectedly strikes Tokyo, everything is turned upside down. Instead of succumbing to dread, Akira sees this as an opportunity to experience life to the fullest rather than settle for his humdrum, depressing existence. He decides to create a bucket list of everything he wants to do before becoming a zombie in order to not only experience it firsthand but also to show that he is still alive and well. This decision gives him a newfound sense of purpose.

Others soon join him in his journey: Kencho, Akira's old college buddy who seeks to be a stand-up comedian; Shizuka, a sullen and blunt woman who is also seeking to escape an abusive life; and Beatrix, a German college graduate infatuated with Japanese culture. With them at his side, Akira embarks on a number of exciting and frequently bizarre excursions throughout zombie-infested Japan, checking off bucket list items that range from simple pleasures like eating at expensive restaurants for free to more extravagant pursuits like going on roller coasters and visiting haunted houses. The group also comes across other survivors who have their own motivations for surviving as they make their way across the country and its swarms of flesh-eating zombies. Along the journey, they forge odd alliances, face their own anxieties, and learn the importance of friendship and the human spirit's ability to persevere in the face of difficulty.

Ultimately, it is revealed that the global zombie pandemic was instigated by the pharmaceutical corporation Umbriel. The virus, which Umbriel obtained from a comet that struck Tokyo prior to the outbreak, was weaponized for biological warfare. However, a countermeasure is discovered when a young gamer girl named Izuna Tokage is found to carry a natural antibody against the pathogen. Researcher Yudai Tsurumi utilizes this antibody to develop a vaccine, providing a potential means to counteract the pandemic.

== Characters ==
=== Main characters ===
Akira Tendo (天道 輝, Tendō Akira)
Voiced by: Shūichirō Umeda (Japanese); Zeno Robinson (English)
Portrayed by: Eiji Akaso
Akira, a former salaryman employed by an exploitative marketing firm, initially embodies a cheerful, ambitious demeanor, but the relentless demands of his job erode his mental and physical health, plunging him into depression. When a zombie apocalypse erupts, he embraces his former optimism, seeing the chaos as liberation from his oppressive routine. Resigned to eventual zombification, he dedicates three years to fulfilling lifelong goals. Despite his carefree demeanor, he fully grasps the crisis but prefers it to his past life. His background as a college rugby player grants him exceptional strength and agility, which he employs to evade threats. Later, he adopts the identity of "Akirager", wearing a shark bite-proof suit to combat zombies directly.
Shizuka Mikazuki (三日月 閑, Mikazuki Shizuka)
Voiced by: Tomori Kusunoki (Japanese); Abby Trott (English)
Portrayed by: Mai Shiraishi
Shizuka, a former high-profile accountant (portrayed as a flight attendant in the live-action film due to her composite with Yukari), endured strict control from her father, leaving her reserved, overly logical, and detached from personal enjoyment. The zombie apocalypse intensifies her survivalist mindset, making her highly resourceful but socially isolated. After repeated encounters with Akira and Kencho, she reluctantly joins them in their RV, unable to drive herself. Gradually, their zest for life influences her, and she begins opening up, eventually forming a romantic relationship with Akira. Inspired by their outlook, she reconnects with her childhood aspiration of becoming a doctor, listing it as her 42nd life goal.
Kenichiro Ryuzaki (竜崎 憲一朗, Ryūzaki Ken'ichirō) / Kencho (ケンチョ)
Voiced by: Makoto Furukawa (Japanese); Xander Mobus (English)
Portrayed by: Shuntarō Yanagi
Kenichiro, nicknamed "Kencho", is Akira's longtime friend and former rugby teammate. A natural entertainer, he constantly jokes around, with Akira as his primary audience. Though successful as a real estate agent, he resents the industry's unethical practices, secretly aspiring to be a stand-up comedian—later listed as his 34th bucket list goal. After Akira rescues him during a zombie attack, they reunite and face the apocalypse together. Like Akira, Kencho retains athletic prowess from his rugby days, with greater raw strength and charisma, traits that fuel his promiscuous tendencies. He often performs impromptu comedy, his signature bit involving stripping naked—much to others' annoyance, though Akira always laughs.
Beatrix Amerhauser (ベアトリクス・アメルハウザー, Beatorikusu Ameruhauzā) / Bea (ベア)
Voiced by: Minami Takahashi (Japanese); Laura Post (English)
Beatrix, a German woman deeply fascinated with Japanese culture, taught herself Japanese and traveled to Japan after college. When the zombie apocalypse begins, she arms herself with samurai armor, a naginata, katanas, and a bow, using self-trained skills to survive. Initially seeking to fulfill her dream of eating sushi prepared by the last surviving chef (item #7 on Akira's bucket list), she joins his group. Her primary objective shifts to experiencing all aspects of Japanese culture. Despite her gentle nature, her combat prowess makes her the group's most formidable fighter.
Takeru Minakata (南方 健, Minakata Takeru) / Takemina (タケミナ)
Takeru, nicknamed Takemina is an old college friend of Akira and Kencho. A self-stylized hippie, he joins Akira's group in order to experience the greatest possible freedom imaginable. Takeru has poor aim, but if he intentionally seeks to miss, then he will always hit his target. This makes him the team's sharpshooter.
Izuna Tokage (戸加下 泉奈, Tokage Izuna)
Izuna is a former high school student who became jaded with society after the death of her father at a young age and her mother's subsequent need to overwork. When the outbreak starts, Izuna is found to be naturally immune to the virus. Upon meeting Akira's group, she joins up with them, and the primary goal of the series shifts to escorting her to a lab where a vaccine can be produced based on her immunity.

=== Supporting characters ===
Mikio Kousaka (高坂 幹夫, Kōsaka Mikio) and Sumire Kousaka (香坂 すみれ, Kōsaka Sumire)
Mikio: Voiced by: Shuhei Sakaguchi (Japanese); Keith Silverstein (English)
Portrayed by: You Takahashi
Sumire: Voiced by: Sara Matsumoto (Japanese); Jennifer Sun Bell (English)
Portrayed by: Akari Hayami
The Kousakas, Akira's previously unknown neighbors, first encounter him during the outbreak when he stumbles upon them hiding in their apartment. Confused by his cheerful demeanor amid the crisis, they watch as he offers to retrieve supplies for them. Upon returning, Akira finds their apartment destroyed and assumes they perished. Inspired by his optimism, however, the couple escapes and commandeers a plane to travel the world before succumbing to zombification. In the live-action adaptation, they are expecting a child and flee to an aquarium instead. Their story serves as an early example of how Akira's outlook influences others during the apocalypse.
Teruo Tendo (天道 照夫, Tendō Teruo)
Voiced by: Hiroyuki Kinoshita (Japanese); Rick Zieff (English)
Teruo is Akira's father and a farmer. A no-nonsense, hardworking man, he routinely, if unintentionally, acts coldly to Akira, leading them to not get along that well. Despite this, Teruo occasionally shows some warmth and idealism (eventually revealing his childhood dream was to become an astronaut and experience the overview effect), and is fiercely loyal to their village. He suffers from various health problems, including back pain, lung problems, and hemorrhoids. This initially causes himself and others to think he is infected, though this later proves to not be the case. Getting Teruo to take hemorrhoid surgery becomes #40 on the bucket list.
Akiko Tendo (天道 明子, Tendō Akiko)
Voiced by: Yuuko Sasaki (Japanese); Jill Remez (English)
Akiko is Akira's mother and Teruo's wife. She is generally more kind-hearted and conciliatory than her husband.

=== Antagonists ===
Gonzou Kosugi (小杉 権蔵, Kosugi Gonzō)
Voiced by: Kenta Miyake (Japanese); Jamieson Price (English)
Portrayed by: Kazuki Kitamura
Gonzou, Akira's former team leader, is a sadistic and manipulative figure who rules through intimidation, berating subordinates even when they follow his orders. He cultivates a cult of personality, demanding loyalty while contributing no work himself. After the apocalypse, he commands a survivor group at a truck stop, escalating his tyranny by exploiting refugees fleeing Tokyo, including Akira, Shizuka, and Kencho. When Gonzou nearly succeeds in coercing Akira into submission, Shizuka intervenes by adding "walking out on Gonzou" as item #37 on the bucket list. His group abandons him during a zombie attack after he prioritizes only himself, leaving him isolated and overwhelmed as the undead close in.
Kanta Higurashi (日暮 莞太, Higurashi Kanta)
Voiced by: Nobuhiko Okamoto (Japanese); Bryce Papenbrook (English)
Higurashi, a former college acquaintance of Akira and Kencho, presents a contrasting personality to Akira. While Akira's extroversion was suppressed by his oppressive work life, Higurashi was a NEET who isolated himself yet blamed society for his bitterness. The apocalypse gives him the freedom to act without consequences, and he joins like-minded individuals who similarly refused to take responsibility for their circumstances. They create a destructive bucket list, culminating in an attack on Akira's village where they release zombies, targeting Akira out of long-held envy. Though causing significant damage, Higurashi is ultimately defeated. In his final moments after being bitten, he redeems himself by leading zombies away before drowning himself in a river.
Shigenobu Kurasagi (蔵杉 重信, Kurasugi Shigenobu)
Voiced by: Seiro Ogino (Japanese); Bill Millsap (English)
A member of Higurashi's group, Kurasagi is a former cellphone shop employer who became disenfranchised with his work and marriage, leading to the latter dissolving. In reality, he expected his wife to do everything for him while he provided money, rather than actually work on their relationship. After joining Higurashi's group during the outbreak, Kurasagi's bucket list item becomes wanting to abuse his wife. During the assault on Akira's village, he fights with Kencho on a roof, who angrily points out his faults. Kencho manages to throw Kurasagi off the roof, where he is devoured by zombies.
Naoki Atenbou (阿天坊 直己, Atenbo Naoki)
Voiced by: Kouji Takeda (Japanese); Bill Rogers (English)
A member of Higurashi's group who worked as a chef apprentice. He refused to apply himself to any of his jobs and would routinely get fired, but chose to blame bad luck over his selfishness. After joining Higurashi's group, Atenbou's bucket list item becomes wanting to forcibly French kiss a girl. During the outbreak, he attempts to do this to Shizuka, but she points out his inability to fear for others and lures Atenbou to where the village elders beat him up, though he survives. Atenbou comes to regret his actions afterwards, and decides to reside in the village to help it rebuild.
Touko Kanbayashi (寒林 陶子, Kanbayashi Tōko)
Voiced by: Manaka Iwami (Japanese); Kate Clarke (English)
A member of Higurashi's group. She was an office manager who constantly nitpicked and belittled every little thing about where she worked. As a result, her coworkers avoided her, which ultimately led to her getting fired. After joining Higurashi's group, Kanbayashi's main bucket list item becomes blowing up her old office building. During the outbreak, she comes into contact with Beatrix, who points out that she needed to be more open to the opinions of others and learn to respect different approaches to the same goal before she is killed.

=== Other characters ===
Saori Ohtori (鳳 沙織, Ōtori Saori)
Voiced by: Sora Amamiya (Japanese); Lauren Landa (English)
Portrayed by: Yui Ichikawa
Ohtori, Akira's former coworker, stood out as one of the few kind figures in his oppressive workplace. Though he harbored strong feelings for her, he never confessed after discovering she was coerced into a sexual relationship with the CEO. When the apocalypse begins, both Ohtori and the CEO succumb to zombification. Upon encountering them, Akira finally expresses his feelings before fleeing, later recognizing this as the first completed item on his bucket list. While he occasionally reflects on her memory, these thoughts diminish as his relationship with Shizuka develops.
Yukari (ユカリ)
Voiced by: Shion Wakayama (Japanese); Xanthe Huynh (English)
Yukari is a flight attendant Akira and Kencho encounter sheltering in a subway store with coworkers Reika and Maki. While Kencho becomes intimate with Maki, Yukari declines Akira's advances, explaining she remains faithful to her missing boyfriend. They instead form a genuine connection, sharing personal aspirations. When an infected man attacks, the outbreak spreads rapidly – Reika turns, then infects Maki before Kencho stops them. Yukari also falls victim but, in her final moments, urges Akira to pursue his dreams as she did through her career. Her death leaves a lasting impact on Akira, who continues to reflect on her words.
Masaru Kumano (熊野 勝, Kumano Masaru)
Voiced by: Naomi Kusumi (Japanese); Richard Epcar (English)
A carpenter from the city. After the outbreak killed his wife and son, Kumano fled into the forest, where zombies do not roam, and began building a treehouse in the forest to reside there away from danger. Upon finding him, Akira and his group help him complete the treehouse due to building a treehouse being on Akira's bucket list. Later, following Higurashi's defeat, Kumano helps the villagers escape from the zombies, and moves into the village to help them rebuild.
Nagisa Kaneshiro (金城 なぎさ, Kaneshiro Nagisa)
Voiced by: Yū Sasahara (Japanese); Jenny Yokobori (English)
A former film industry makeup artist, she was working on a zombie movie set when the actual outbreak began. After escaping to Akira's village, she befriends his group alongside two other urban survivors. Her expertise proves vital against Higurashi's attack – she disguises Akira as a zombie using professional makeup, enabling him to infiltrate and neutralize the threat. This simultaneously fulfills one of Akira's bucket list goals: experiencing cosplay. Her specialized skills make her a valuable asset to the community during the crisis.
Kongouji Hikoemon (金剛寺 彦右衛門, Hikoemon Kongoji)
Voiced by: Shigeru Chiba^{Ep. 10 credits} (Japanese); Steve Kramer (English)
Known as "Old Man Hikoe", he is one of the elders in Akira's village. Once the greatest hunter in the village, Hikoe has since become a senile old man who, following the death of his wife, experiences bouts of delirium. This includes believing Shizuka to be his granddaughter, Akemi, who long ago left for the city, and routinely tries to hug Shizuka as a result. This particular delusion proves crucial during Higurashi's attack, however, as Hikoe inspires some of the other villagers to save Shizuka from Atenbou after Shizuka herself saves them from zombies.
Anju (杏樹)
Voiced by: Kino Sakai^{Ep. 10 credits} (Japanese); Lisa Reimold (English)
A young girl from the city. After losing both of her parents in the outbreak, she and her dog Charl escaped into Akira's village. In her mourning, she became distant and lonely from the other villagers, until Kencho manages to cheer her up with his comedy. Kencho also protects her during Higurashi's attack, and in gratitude she dubs him a comedian, allowing him to knock it off the bucket list.

== Production ==
Haro Aso, the author of the series, commented that the handling of the zombie genre as entertainment has been overused in several types of media. Aso was planning a new work when he came up with the idea of "let's do a zombie one". So, Aso came up with the idea of a protagonist who can see zombies as something fun, thinking that real people might be more disgusting than zombies, and "It would be interesting to mix zombies and company beasts". He has come up with the idea of having company animals as the main characters. However, he was impressed after watching the 2018 Japanese film One Cut of the Dead. Aso was amazed by the take a "heartwarming zombie comedy" by Shin'ichirō Ueda. Though the manga predated the film, Aso enjoyed One Cut of the Dead while adding that he wrote the manga without being conscious of the international market. Aso originally preferred Western movies over domestic ones, leading to his manga being more influenced by the former. In order to stand out as a manga author, he wanted to make a commentary about Japanese society in order to tell the audience to laugh, something different from previous zombie works. The style is described as "a little offbeat, a little silly". While telling a ridiculous story, his message was telling the readers to do whatever they want like his characters do.

Aso, who had no experience working in a company, interviewed his friend, an office worker. While drinking on the weekend and taking notes on his friend's complaints. As Aso listened to him, he commented that he thought to himself: "If this is the case, I'd still rather be a zombie". From that story, he envisioned the main character, Akira, who puts off everything he wants to do and devotes himself to his work at the company. Then, he put Akira into a zombie world, thus initiating the production of the story.

Artist Kotaro Takata said that the theme of zombies was something he always wanted to work on, with some of his favorite works in the horror genre being Zombieland and Z Nation. Aso and Takada, who is in charge of the animation, were "originally private friends who often went camping together." According to Aso, Takada said things like "When this series is over, I'm going to go back to my parents' house and start farming and hunting," as if he "always wanted to escape from reality." When Aso was thinking about the story, Takada came to mind, and he called him to ask if he wanted to start a work together. Takada agreed, taking charge of the illustrations.

== Media ==
=== Manga ===
Written by Haro Aso and illustrated by Kotaro Takata, Zom 100: Bucket List of the Dead began serialization in Shogakukan's seinen manga magazine Monthly Sunday Gene-X on October 19, 2018. Shogakukan has collected its chapters into individual tankōbon volumes. The first volume was released on March 19, 2019. As of August 19, 2026, 23 volumes have been released.

In North America, Viz Media announced the English release of the series in July 2020. On May 9, 2023, Viz Media launched their Viz Manga digital manga service, with the series' chapters receiving simultaneous English publication in North America as they are released in Japan. In Singapore, the manga has been licensed by Shogakukan Asia.

==== Volumes ====
- Note: The chapters are numbered after a superscript # symbol (^{#}).

No.	Original release date	Original ISBN	English release date	English ISBN
1	March 19, 2019	978-4-09-157561-6	February 16, 2021	978-1-9747-2056-9
^{#}1: "Akira of the Dead" (アキラオブザデッド, Akira obu za Deddo); ^{#}2: "Bucket List of the Dead" (バケットリストオブザデッド, Baketto Risuto obu za Deddo); ^{#}3: "Best Friend of the Dead" (ベストフレンドオブザデッド, Besuto Furendo obu za Deddo); ^{#}3.5: "Sakura Mochi of the Dead" (サクラモチオブザデッド, Sakura Mochi obu za Deddo)
2	July 19, 2019	978-4-09-157568-5	May 18, 2021	978-1-9747-2066-8
^{#}4: "Flight Attendant of the Dead (1)" (CAオブザデッド①, Shī-Ā obu za Deddo 1); ^{#}5: "Flight Attendant of the Dead (2)" (CAオブザデッド②, Shī-Ā obu za Deddo 2); ^{#}6: "Hero of the Dead (1)" (ヒーローオブザデッド①, Hīrō obu za Deddo 1); ^{#}7: "Hero of the Dead (2)" (ヒーローオブザデッド②, Hīrō obu za Deddo 2)
3	October 18, 2019	978-4-09-157575-3	August 17, 2021	978-1-9747-2067-5
^{#}8: "RV of the Dead" (キャンピングカーオブザデッド, Kyanpingu Kā obu za Deddo (Note: Camping Car of the Dead)); ^{#}9: "Truck Stop of the Dead (1)" (SAオブザデッド①, Esu-Ā obu za Deddo 1); ^{#}10: "Truck Stop of the Dead (2)" (SAオブザデッド②, Esu-Ā obu za Deddo 2); ^{#}11: "Truck Stop of the Dead (3)" (SAオブザデッド③, Esu-Ā obu za Deddo 3)
4	February 19, 2020	978-4-09-157587-6	November 16, 2021	978-1-9747-2297-6
^{#}12: "Sushi of the Dead" (スシオブザデッド, Sushi obu za Deddo); ^{#}13: "Hot Springs of the Dead" (ホットスプリングオブザデッド, Hotto Supuringu obu za Deddo); ^{#}14: "Treehouse of the Dead" (ツリーハウスオブザデッド, Tsurīhausu obu za Deddo); ^{#}15: "Hometown of the Dead (1)" (ホームタウンオブザデッド①, Hōmutaun obu za Deddo 1); Bonus: "Show Club of the Dead" (ショークラブオブザデッド, Shō Kurabu obu za Deddo)
5	June 19, 2020	978-4-09-157598-2	February 15, 2022	978-1-9747-2298-3
^{#}16: "Hometown of the Dead (2)" (ホームタウンオブザデッド②, Hōmutaun obu za Deddo 2); ^{#}17: "Hometown of the Dead (3)" (ホームタウンオブザデッド③, Hōmutaun obu za Deddo 3); ^{#}18: "Hometown of the Dead (4)" (ホームタウンオブザデッド④, Hōmutaun obu za Deddo 4); ^{#}19: "Hometown of the Dead (5)" (ホームタウンオブザデッド⑤, Hōmutaun obu za Deddo 5); Bonus: "Dating App of the Dead" (マッチングアプリオブザデッド, Macchingu Apuri obu za Deddo)
6	October 16, 2020	978-4-09-157609-5	May 17, 2022	978-1-9747-2451-2
^{#}20: "Hometown of the Dead (6)" (ホームタウンオブザデッド⑥, Hōmutaun obu za Deddo 6); ^{#}21: "Hometown of the Dead (7)" (ホームタウンオブザデッド⑦, Hōmutaun obu za Deddo 7); ^{#}22: "Cross-Country Trip of the Dead" (クロスカントリーオブザデッド, Kurosu-Kantorī obu za Deddo); Bonus: "Manga Meat of the Dead" (マンガニク オブ ザ デッド, Manganiku obu za Deddo); Bonus: "Kosakas of the Dead" (コーサカオブザデッド, Kōsaka obu za Deddo)
7	January 19, 2021	978-4-09-157621-7	August 16, 2022	978-1-9747-2908-1
^{#}23: "Spartathalon of the Dead" (スパルタスロンオブザデッド, Suparutasuron obu za Deddo); ^{#}24: "Suite of the Dead (1)" (スイートルームオブザデッド①, Suītorūmu obu za Deddo 1); ^{#}25: "Suite of the Dead (2)" (スイートルームオブザデッド②, Suītorūmu obu za Deddo 2); ^{#}26: "Suite of the Dead (3)" (スイートルームオブザデッド③, Suītorūmu obu za Deddo 3); Bonus: "Akira in Borderland (今際の国のアキラ, Imawa no kuni no Akira)
8	May 19, 2021	978-4-09-157609-5	November 15, 2022	978-1-9747-3405-4
^{#}27: "Sake of the Dead" (サケオブザデッド, Sake obu za Deddo); ^{#}28: "Dinosaurs of the Dead (1)" (ダイナソーオブザデッド①, Dainasō obu za Deddo 1); ^{#}29: "Dinosaurs of the Dead (2)" (ダイナソーオブザデッド②, Dainasō obu za Deddo 2); ^{#}30: "Boredom of the Dead" (ヒツマブシオブザデッド, Hitsumabushi obu za Deddo)
9	October 19, 2021	978-4-09-157653-8	February 21, 2023	978-1-9747-3406-1
^{#}31: "Millionaire of the Dead (1)" (ミリオネアオブザデッド①, Mirionea obu za Deddo 1); ^{#}32: "Millionaire of the Dead (2)" (ミリオネアオブザデッド②, Mirionea obu za Deddo 2); ^{#}33: "Millionaire of the Dead (3)" (ミリオネアオブザデッド③, Mirionea obu za Deddo 3); ^{#}34: "Millionaire of the Dead (4)" (ミリオネアオブザデッド④, Mirionea obu za Deddo 4); Bonus: "Teeth Whitening of the Dead" (ホワイトニングオブザデッド, Howaitoningu obu za Deddo)
10	February 18, 2022	978-4-09-157669-9	May 16, 2023	978-1-9747-3647-8
^{#}35: "Millionaire of the Dead (5)" (ミリオネアオブザデッド⑤, Mirionea obu za Deddo 5); ^{#}36: "Geisha of the Dead (1)" (ゲイシャオブザデッド①, Geisha obu za Deddo 1); ^{#}37: "Geisha of the Dead (2)" (ゲイシャオブザデッド②, Geisha obu za Deddo 2); ^{#}38: "Pilgrimage of the Dead (1)" (ピルグリメイジオブザデッド①, Pirugurimeiji obu za Deddo)
11	June 17, 2022	978-4-09-157681-1	August 15, 2023	978-1-9747-3877-9
^{#}39: "Pilgrimage of the Dead (2)" (ピルグリメイジオブザデッド②, Pirugurimeiji obu za Deddo 2); ^{#}40: "Pilgrimage of the Dead (3)" (ピルグリメイジオブザデッド③, Pirugurimeiji obu za Deddo 3); ^{#}41: "Cruiser of the Dead (1)" (クルーザーオブザデッド①, Kurūzā obu za Deddo 1); ^{#}42: "Cruiser of the Dead (2)" (クルーザーオブザデッド②, Kurūzā obu za Deddo 2)
12	November 17, 2022	978-4-09-157700-9	November 21, 2023	978-1-9747-4134-2
^{#}43: "Deserted Island of the Dead (1)" (デザートアイランドオブザデッド①, Dezāto Airando obu za Deddo 1); ^{#}44: "Deserted Island of the Dead (2)" (デザートアイランドオブザデッド②, Dezāto Airando obu za Deddo 2); ^{#}45: "Steam Locomotive of the Dead" (SLオブザデッド, SL obu za Deddo); ^{#}46: "Beloved of the Dead" (プレシャスオブザデッド, Pureshasu obu za Deddo)
13	February 17, 2023	978-4-09-157728-3	February 20, 2024	978-1-9747-4362-9
^{#}47: "Survival Game of the Dead (1)" (サバゲーオブザデッド①, Sabagē obu za Deddo 1); ^{#}48: "Survival Game of the Dead (2)" (サバゲーオブザデッド②, Sabagē obu za Deddo 2); ^{#}49: "Survival Game of the Dead (3)" (サバゲーオブザデッド③, Sabagē obu za Deddo 3); ^{#}50: "Survival Game of the Dead (4)" (サバゲーオブザデッド④, Sabagē obu za Deddo 4)
14	June 30, 2023	978-4-09-157756-6	May 21, 2024	978-1-9747-4574-6
^{#}51: "Survival Game of the Dead (5)" (サバゲーオブザデッド⑤, Sabagē obu za Deddo 5); ^{#}52: "Grandpa of the Dead (1)" (グランパオブザデッド①, Guranpa obu za Deddo 1); ^{#}53: "Grandpa of the Dead (2)" (グランパオブザデッド②, Guranpa obu za Deddo 2); ^{#}54: "Blue Marlin of the Dead" (ブルーマーリン・オブ・ザ・デッド, Burū Mārin obu za Deddo)
15	September 19, 2023	978-4-09-157781-8	August 20, 2024	978-1-9747-4573-9
^{#}55: "Dolphins of the Dead (1)" (ドルフィンオブザデッド①, Dorufin obu za Deddo 1); ^{#}56: "Dolphins of the Dead (2)" (ドルフィンオブザデッド②, Dorufin obu za Deddo 2); ^{#}57: "Dolphins of the Dead (3)" (ドルフィンオブザデッド③, Dorufin obu za Deddo 3); Bonus: "Kencho in Borderland" (今際の国のケンチョ, Imawa no Kuni no Kencho); Bonus: "Making of the Dead (Anime ver)" (メイキングオブザデッド(アニメ編), Meikingu obu za Deddo (Anime-hen)); Bonus: "Making of the Dead (Live-action)" (メイキングオブザデッド(実写映画), Meikingu obu za Deddo (Jissha Eiga))
16	February 19, 2024	978-4-09-157795-5	December 17, 2024	978-1-9747-4986-7
^{#}58: "Haunted Manor of the Dead (1)" (ホラーマンションオブザデッド①, Horā Manshon obu za Deddo 1); ^{#}59: "Haunted Manor of the Dead (2)" (ホラーマンションオブザデッド②, Horā Manshon obu za Deddo 2); ^{#}60: "Haunted Manor of the Dead (3)" (ホラーマンションオブザデッド③, Horā Manshon obu za Deddo 3); ^{#}61: "Happiness of the Dead" (ハピネス オブ ザ デッド, Hapinesu obu za Deddo)
17	June 19, 2024	978-4-09-157826-6	May 20, 2025	978-1-9747-5656-8
^{#}62: "Outer Space of the Dead (1)" (アウタースペースオブザデッド①, Autā Supēsu obu za Deddo 1); ^{#}63: "Outer Space of the Dead (2)" (アウタースペースオブザデッド②, Autā Supēsu obu za Deddo 2); ^{#}64: "Outer Space of the Dead (3)" (アウタースペースオブザデッド③, Autā Supēsu obu za Deddo 3); ^{#}65: "Outer Space of the Dead (4)" (アウタースペースオブザデッド④, Autā Supēsu obu za Deddo 4)
18	November 19, 2024	978-4-09-157845-7	December 16, 2025	978-1-9747-5827-2
^{#}66: "Outer Space of the Dead (5)" (アウタースペースオブザデッド⑤, Autā Supēsu obu za Deddo 5); ^{#}67: "Outer Space of the Dead (6)" (アウタースペースオブザデッド⑥, Autā Supēsu obu za Deddo 6); ^{#}68: "Outer Space of the Dead (7)" (アウタースペースオブザデッド⑦, Autā Supēsu obu za Deddo 7); ^{#}69: "Outer Space of the Dead (8)" (アウタースペースオブザデッド⑧, Autā Supēsu obu za Deddo 8)
19	March 18, 2025	978-4-09-157877-8	April 21, 2026	978-1-9747-6166-1
^{#}70: "Safari of the Dead (1)" (サファリオブザデッド①, Safari obu za Deddo 1); ^{#}71: "Safari of the Dead (2)" (サファリオブザデッド②, Safari obu za Deddo 2); ^{#}72: "Safari of the Dead (3)" (サファリオブザデッド③, Safari obu za Deddo 3); ^{#}73: "Fried Egg of the Dead" (目玉焼きオブザデッド, Medamayaki obu za Deddo)
20	July 18, 2025	978-4-09-157886-0	June 23, 2026	978-1-9747-6593-5
^{#}74: "Skydiving of the Dead (1)" (スカイダイビングオブザデッド①, Sukaidaibingu obu za Deddo 1); ^{#}74.2: "Skydiving of the Dead (2)" (スカイダイビングオブザデッド②, Sukaidaibingu obu za Deddo 2); ^{#}75: "Haisai of the Dead (1)" (ハイサイオブザデッド①, Haisai obu za Deddo 1); ^{#}76: "Haisai of the Dead (2)" (ハイサイオブザデッド②, Haisai obu za Deddo 2); ^{#}77: "Haisai of the Dead (3)" (ハイサイオブザデッド③, Haisai obu za Deddo 3)
21	November 19, 2025	978-4-09-158203-4	December 22, 2026	978-1-9747-6869-1
^{#}78: "Haisai of the Dead (4)" (ハイサイオブザデッド④, Haisai obu za Deddo 4); ^{#}79: "Song of the Dead (1)" (歌オブザデッド①, Uta obu za Deddo 1); ^{#}80: "Song of the Dead (2)" (歌オブザデッド②, Uta obu za Deddo 2); ^{#}81: "Song of the Dead (3)" (歌オブザデッド③, Uta obu za Deddo 3)
22	April 17, 2026	978-4-09-158224-9	—	—
^{#}82: "Song of the Dead (4)" (歌オブザデッド④, Uta obu za Deddo 4); ^{#}83: "Vaccine of the Dead (1)" (ワクチンオブザデッド①, Wakuchin obu za Deddo 1); ^{#}84: "Vaccine of the Dead (2)" (ワクチンオブザデッド②, Wakuchin obu za Deddo 2); ^{#}85: "Carrier of the Dead (1)" (キャリアオブザデッド①, Kyaria obu za Deddo 1)
23	August 19, 2026	978-4-09-158236-2	—	—
^{#}86: "Carrier of the Dead (2)" (キャリアオブザデッド②, Kyaria obu za Deddo 2); ^{#}87: "Carrier of the Dead (3)" (キャリアオブザデッド③, Kyaria obu za Deddo 3); ^{#}88: "Carrier of the Dead (4)" (キャリアオブザデッド④, Kyaria obu za Deddo 4); ^{#}89: "Sword of the Dead (1)" (剣オブザデッド①, Ken obu za Deddo 1)

==== Chapters not yet in tankōbon format ====
- ^{#}90: "Sword of the Dead (2)" (剣オブザデッド②, Ken obu za Deddo 2)
- ^{#}91: "Robotics of the Dead (1)" (ロボット工学オブザデッド①, Robotto kōgaku obu za Deddo 1)

=== Anime ===
On January 6, 2023, an anime television series adaptation was announced, as part of a deal between Viz Media, Shogakukan, and Shogakukan-Shueisha Productions. It was produced by Bug Films and directed by Kazuki Kawagoe, with assistant direction by Hanako Ueda, scripts supervised by Hiroshi Seko, character designs by Kii Tanaka, zombie designs by Junpei Fukuchi, and music composed by Makoto Miyazaki. The series aired from July 9 to December 26, 2023, in the Nichigo time slot on all JNN stations in Japan, including MBS and TBS. The opening theme song is "Song of the Dead" (ソングオブザデッド), performed by Kana-Boon, while the ending theme song is "Happiness of the Dead" (ハピネス オブ ザ デッド), performed by Shiyui.

Hulu, Netflix, and Crunchyroll streamed the series in the United States simultaneously with its Japanese release. The English dub of the series aired in the United States on Adult Swim's Toonami programming block from March 31 to July 7, 2024. It was released on Blu-ray Disc set on October 8, 2024. Muse Communication licensed the series in Asia-Pacific.

==== Episodes ====
No.	Title	Directed by (Note: Production staff information is taken from the ending credits of each episode)	Chief animation directed by	Original release date	English air date
1	"Akira of the Dead"; Transliteration: "Akira obu za Deddo" (Japanese: アキラ オブ ザ デッド)	Kazuki Kawagoe	Hiroaki Karasu	July 9, 2023	March 31, 2024
Akira Tendo is a young office worker who hates his job. Three years ago, an excited Akira came to Tokyo to work after graduation but increasingly becomes disillusioned after learning his company ruthlessly exploits their employees. Despite being depressed, he continues to stay due to his coworker, Saori Ohtori, the only one who treats him with kindness but is unable to confess his feelings since Ohtori is also the CEO's mistress. When a zombie outbreak hits Tokyo, rather than despair, Akira greets it with happiness since he is finally free. He heads to Ohtori's apartment to rescue her only to discover he was too late as she and the CEO have turned into zombies. Akira tells the CEO he quits before pushing him to his death and confesses his feelings to a zombified Ohtori before escaping. Realizing he might get killed during the outbreak, Akira makes a bucket list of 100 things he wants to do before he becomes a zombie.
2	"Bucket List of the Dead"; Transliteration: "Baketto Risuto obu za Deddo" (Japanese: バケットリスト オブ ザ デッド)	Directed by : Toshihiro Maeya; Storyboarded by : Hanako Ueda	Kii Tanaka, Haruhito Takada & Hiroaki Karasu	July 16, 2023	April 7, 2024
Akira starts to revel in his newfound freedom by drinking beer in the morning. However, he soon realizes that he has run out. Sneaking down a pipe to avoid zombies, he meets the Kousakas, his despairing neighbors who become more hopeful seeing his cheerful demeanor. When he arrives at the convenience store, Akira meets another survivor scavenging the place, who admonishes him for only taking items she considers unnecessary for survival. She takes off after she saves his life. With his bike destroyed, he ultimately finds a motorcycle and uses it to escape. When he finally returns home, Akira notices zombies have managed to break into the Kousakas' apartment. Retreating to his apartment, he solemnly reflects on his situation. As such, Akira writes down a bucket list of 100 things he wants to do before he becomes a zombie. Meanwhile, a flashback shows that prior to meeting Akira, the girl was obsessed with survival, but after meeting him begins to wonder if there might be room for some fun.
3	"Best Friend of the Dead"; Transliteration: "Besuto Furendo obu za Deddo" (Japanese: ベストフレンド オブ ザ デッド)	Jun Shinohara	Hiroki Yamamura	July 23, 2023	April 14, 2024
Shou and other survivors defend Club Shou-Time. Meanwhile, after Akira crosses growing a cool beard off his bucket list, he vows to find his friend Kencho. He then notices his phone has unread notifications. Elsewhere, Kencho is trapped at Club Shou-Time when he receives a call from Akira, who promises to meet him. As he heads to Shinjuku, Akira recalls their friendship prior to the outbreak. Just as the zombies are about to kill Shou, they are distracted when they hear some noise. Once Akira and Kencho reunite, Akira apologizes to Kencho for being jealous of him before zombies chase them onto the roof. After Akira successfully jumps onto the roof of another building, he tells Kencho to do the same. Kencho refuses and reveals to Akira he hated his job as a real estate agent and what he really wants to do is be a stand-up comedian. With Akira's encouragement, Kencho makes it while he takes off his clothes. Later that night, Akira and Kencho have a conversation while they are naked.
4	"Flight Attendant of the Dead"; Transliteration: "Shī-Ē obu za Deddo" (Japanese: CA オブ ザ デッド)	Katsuya Ōshima	Hiroaki Karasu & Haruhito Takada	July 30, 2023 (Note: Due to production circumstances, the premiere of episode 4 was delayed a day on some streaming services.)	April 21, 2024
Akira and Kencho decide to go to the department store to get a flat-screen TV as Akira had it on his bucket list. When they arrive there, they discover they are not alone as they meet an old man and three flight attendants named Yukari, Maki, and Reika. They end up wining and dining with the girls, which was another thing on the bucket list. Akira eventually drinks too much trying to impress the girls, while Kencho and Maki head to the furniture department to have sex. Meanwhile, Reika is attacked by the zombified old man. Yukari later approaches Akira and the two ultimately have a conversation about their dream jobs. When Kencho investigates the commotion, Maki is killed by a zombified Reika, while Kencho himself is forced to smash Reika's head. As Yukari is about to say something to Akira, she is attacked and bitten by the old man. Despite Akira's pleas, she willingly sacrifices herself when the old man attacks them again. Akira and Kencho manage to escape with a flat-screen TV. When they get back to their base, Akira adds his desire to recall his childhood dream to his bucket list.
Special	"Zom 100 Special Program: 100 Things You Need to Prepare to Run Away from Zombies"; Transliteration: "Zom 100 Tokuban ~Zombie Kara Nigekiru Tame ni Junbi Shitai 100 no Koto~" (Japanese: ゾン100 特番～ゾンビから逃げ切るために準備したい100のこと～)	N/A	N/A	August 6, 2023 (Note: Episode 5 was delayed a week from its originally scheduled air date of August 6, 2023.)	N/A
A recap that covers the first four episodes of the series.
5	"Hero of the Dead"; Transliteration: "Hīrō obu za Deddo" (Japanese: ヒーロー オブ ザ デッド)	Shōtarō Tamemizu	Hiroaki Karasu, Haruhito Takada & Atsuko Nakajima	August 13, 2023	April 28, 2024
Recalling what his childhood dream was, Akira heads to the aquarium with Kencho to grab a shark suit so he can achieve said dream of being a superhero. Elsewhere, the girl Akira previously met is on a bus when one of the passengers turns into a zombie. She and the remaining survivors head to the aquarium where they are rescued by Akira. When he approaches her, she questions his motives. After investigating a loud noise, Akira and Kencho discover a zombified shark with legs is on the loose. While everyone is running away, the girl gets left behind. Once Akira rescues her again, she comes up with a plan to stop the shark. A naked Kencho provides a distraction which allows Akira to electrocute the shark. Before they part ways, Akira and the girl, whose name is Shizuka Mikazuki, exchange contact information.
6	"RV of the Dead"; Transliteration: "Kyanpingu Kā obu za Deddo" (Japanese: キャンピングカー オブ ザ デッド)	Toshihiro Maeya	Hiroaki Karasu & Haruhito Takada	August 27, 2023 (Note: Due to the broadcast of the 2023 World Athletics Championships, episode 6 was delayed by a week from its originally scheduled air date of August 20, 2023. The premiere of the episode was delayed by a day on some streaming services due to production circumstances.)	May 5, 2024
After Akira and Kencho grab a pair of solid gold watches, they decide to head to Gunma. When they arrive at an RV dealership, they run into Shizuka. Once an RV is chosen, the trio continue their journey until they are stopped by a spike strip, which also injures Kencho. They are then confronted by a group led by Gonzou Kosugi, Akira's former boss. A nervous Akira reluctantly agrees to work for Gonzou again for two days in exchange to use his truck stop. The next day, while Shizuka is with Kencho, an annoyed Gonzou is forced to announce that he is throwing a welcome party for Akira and his friends after he catches Akira chilling beer for everyone. Gonzou later taunts Akira when the former reveals he is using the latter, the zombies, and everyone else as cheap labor.
7	"Truck Stop of the Dead"; Transliteration: "Esu-Ā obu za Deddo" (Japanese: SA オブ ザ デッド)	Directed by : Kazuya Monma; Storyboarded by : Hanako Ueda	Hiroaki Karasu	September 3, 2023 (Note: Due to production circumstances, the premiere of episode 7 was delayed by a day on some streaming services.)	June 2, 2024
Seeing Akira being abused by Gonzou reminds Shizuka how her father controlled every aspect of her life. While she is in the RV, Shizuka finds Akira's bucket list and writes "Tell Kosugi Off" in it. Elsewhere, unbeknownst to a couple of members of the supply gathering team, a zombie is hiding in their truck. Back at the truck stop, when Akira, Kencho and Shizuka attempt to leave, Gonzou manipulates Akira into staying. A furious Shizuka calls out Gonzou for being a coward before she hands Akira his bucket list back to him, which reveals what she wrote down earlier. As such, Akira finally gains the confidence to tell Gonzou off. Once chaos ensues when the truck arrives and releases the zombie, Akira successfully neutralizes the situation and saves everyone, even Gonzou. After Gonzou's gang leaves him behind at the truck stop due to his abusive and controlling behavior as well as his cowardice, Akira, Kencho, and Shizuka continue their journey.
8	"Sushi & Hot Springs of the Dead"; Transliteration: "Sushi & Hotto Supuringu obu za Deddo" (Japanese: スシ&ホットスプリング オブ ザ デッド)	Gorō Kuji	Hanako Ueda & Haruhito Takada	September 17, 2023 (Note: Episode 8 was delayed a week due to a recap episode. The premiere of the episode was delayed by a day on some streaming services due to production circumstances.)	June 9, 2024
After Akira, Kencho, and Shizuka try Paddleboard Yoga, the trio continue their journey where they encounter a female otaku from Germany named Beatrix Amerhauser. Akira agrees to help her deliver fish to Takasaki since eating at a sushi restaurant is on his bucket list. When they arrive there, Akira and Beatrix fight a horde of zombies until the latter are lured away and killed in an explosion caused by Kencho and Shizuka. Everyone has a good time eating sushi that night. Sometime later, the quartet arrive at a hot spring. As they are enjoying themselves, they discover it is surrounded and are forced to flee. While he is alone, Akira finds a seemingly unoccupied hot spring in the mountains. However, he runs into Shizuka where they have a heartfelt conversation about love before they are joined by Kencho and Beatrix.
9	"Treehouse of the Dead"; Transliteration: "Tsurīhausu obu za Deddo" (Japanese: ツリーハウス オブ ザ デッド)	Yū Harima	Hiroaki Karasu	September 24, 2023 (Note: Due to production circumstances, the premiere of episode 9 was delayed by a day on some streaming services.)	June 16, 2024
Akira, Kencho, Shizuka, and Beatrix are near Gunma when they come across a barricaded tunnel full of zombies. While taking a detour through the forest, they rescue an old man named Masaru Kumano from a zombified boar. A thankful Kumano shows the quartet the treehouse he is building, which causes an excited Akira to help out. Once the treehouse is completed, the quartet part ways with Kumano. After a while, they finally arrive at Akira's home village. When Akira reunites with his parents, he has a hard time repaying them. Elsewhere, it is revealed Akira's father has a wound. Meanwhile, another group in the village is completing a bucket list of their own.
10	"Hometown of the Dead I"; Transliteration: "Hōmutaun obu za Deddo I" (Japanese: ホームタウン オブ ザ デッド I)	Sachiko Kanno	Haruhito Takada	December 25, 2023 (Note: Episodes 10–12 aired consecutively on JNN affiliates on December 25, 2023, at 11:40 p.m., until December 26 at 1:10 a.m. JST.)	June 23, 2024
As the quartet settles into Akira's village, they meet other survivors from the nearby city and slowly get to know them. That evening, Akira listens to his father talk about his dream of wanting to be an astronaut and how small their world really is once they get to explore more. Meanwhile, the other group led by Kanta Higurashi, Akira and Kencho's former university classmate, take down the barriers blocking the tunnel and soon lead the zombies to the village, causing havoc and terrorizing the villagers along the way. Akira and the others realize an electric fence has trapped everyone in the village, forcing them to make plans to evacuate the village and fight back.
11	"Hometown of the Dead II"; Transliteration: "Hōmutaun obu za Deddo II" (Japanese: ホームタウン オブ ザ デッド II)	Hiroaki Takagi	Hiroaki Karasu	December 26, 2023	June 30, 2024
While the members of the quartet brawl with others from Higurashi's group, Akira goes to defend his parents and other survivors from the zombies. However, Akira's father resolves to defend the family and throws Akira into the house to confront the zombies on his own. In a series of flashbacks, each member of Higurashi's group recount their worst memories before the pandemic started that caused their resentment towards society. They decided to vent their frustrations by destroying the village, but are instead thwarted in their encounters with Akira's group. Before Akira's father is turned into a zombie, Higurashi saves him but then holds him hostage, taunting Akira to prove that he is a good son.
12	"Hometown of the Dead III"; Transliteration: "Hōmutaun obu za Deddo III" (Japanese: ホームタウン オブ ザ デッド III)	Jun Shinohara	Hiroaki Karasu & Haruhito Takada	December 26, 2023	July 7, 2024
A flashback shows that Higurashi grew from a happy child to an antisocial loner who began to despise society, especially people like Akira. He decides to take it out on Akira and make him choose between him and his father. Akira seemingly turns into a zombie but quickly gets the upper hand on Higurashi. It is revealed that Akira disguised himself as a zombie with the help of some of the survivors to trick Higurashi. When Akira confronts him, Higurashi has a breakdown while he reveals that he just wanted to have friends. After he is bitten by a zombie, Higurashi accepts his fate, sacrificing himself to buy time while Akira and the other survivors attempt to evacuate the village but realize the bridge connecting them across a canyon has been destroyed. Fortunately, Kumano has built a bridge just in time. Akira and Kencho hold the bridge while the villagers evacuate, and they barely escape. The villagers eventually manage to trap the zombies in the tunnel again and begin to rebuild. Akira learns his father is not infected and instead has hemorrhoids. The quartet soon makes plans to continue their goals to survive the zombie apocalypse and leave the village to explore the world and fulfil their dreams.

=== Live-action film ===
On June 7, 2022, during the Geeked Week livestream, Netflix announced a live-action film adaptation. Yusuke Ishida directed the film, based on a screenplay by Tatsuro Mishima. Akira Morii served as producer at Robot Communications, in collaboration with Plus One Entertainment. The film premiered on August 3, 2023. The theme song is "HoriZom" performed by Ren.

== Reception ==
=== Manga ===
==== Critical reception ====
Briana Lawrence of The Mary Sue praised the manga's premise for making the reader care not for Akira's quest but instead of the fact that he does not care about the fact there are zombies in Japan and how he spends his free time. Akira's viewpoint of the post-apocalyptic world was compared to an optimistic view to the world's situation during the COVID-19 pandemic. Kara Dennison of Otaku USA said the series gives several positive messages, such as Akira's optimism when dealing with the chaotic world as well as the cast in general's outlook to the current status quo. Koiwai of Manga News found the story quirky, crazy, and cynical, praising the handling of Akira, while responding positively to the artwork, especially the drawing of zombies.

==== Accolades ====
The series was nominated for the Eisner Award in the Best U.S. Edition of International Material—Asia and Best Humor Publication categories in 2022. The series was also nominated for the 69th Shogakukan Manga Award in 2023. (Note: Unlike previous years, the nominees were not divided into categories in the 2023 award.)

=== Anime ===
==== Critical reception ====
On review aggregator website Rotten Tomatoes, the series holds an approval rating of 100% based on five reviews, with an average rating of 9.7/10. The critics from Anime News Network gave the first episode a very positive reception. James Beckett and Richard Eisenbeis gave it a perfect score, complimenting the storytelling, visuals, direction, animation and the handling of Akira's character. Rebecca Silverman described that the art direction is fascinating and does a remarkable job of emphasizing the decline of Akira's quality of life and its sudden resurgence. Nicholas Dupree praised its animation, direction and Akira's character while noting that "[the show] is simple, a bit trashy, and doesn't do much to innovate in the well-trodden ground of zombie fiction, but it has a solid emotional core and an excess of energy."

Daniel Kurland of Den of Geek describing the series premiere, saying, "This first episode utilizes a simple, yet effective, trick where the color palette is actively muted during the extended flashback that's set during the early days at Akira's job." Regarding the series' opening theme song, he described it as "an absolute banger and perfectly captures the anime's bombastic, care-free energy." Rafael Motamayor of IGN called the series premiere as "one of the best first episodes of an anime in a long time", praising its visual storytelling, framing, and color in handling Akira's miserable work life. He also praised the series for its refreshing take on a zombie genre, characters, and humor, while criticizing its animation quality as unreliable due to the studio's production delays that made it a "less-than-perfect watch."

==== Accolades ====
Zom 100: Bucket List of the Dead was nominated at the 8th Crunchyroll Anime Awards in six categories: Best New Series, Best Comedy, Best Art Direction (Taketo Gonpei), Best Opening Sequence ("Song of the Dead" by Kana-Boon), Best Ending Sequence ("Happiness of the Dead" by Shiyui), and Best Voice Artist Performance – German (Patrick Keller as Akira Tendo). The series was nominated for the 2024 Annecy International Animation Film Festival's TV Films category, which held from June 9–15 of the same year.
