= Aya Asahina =

Japanese model and actress (born 1993)

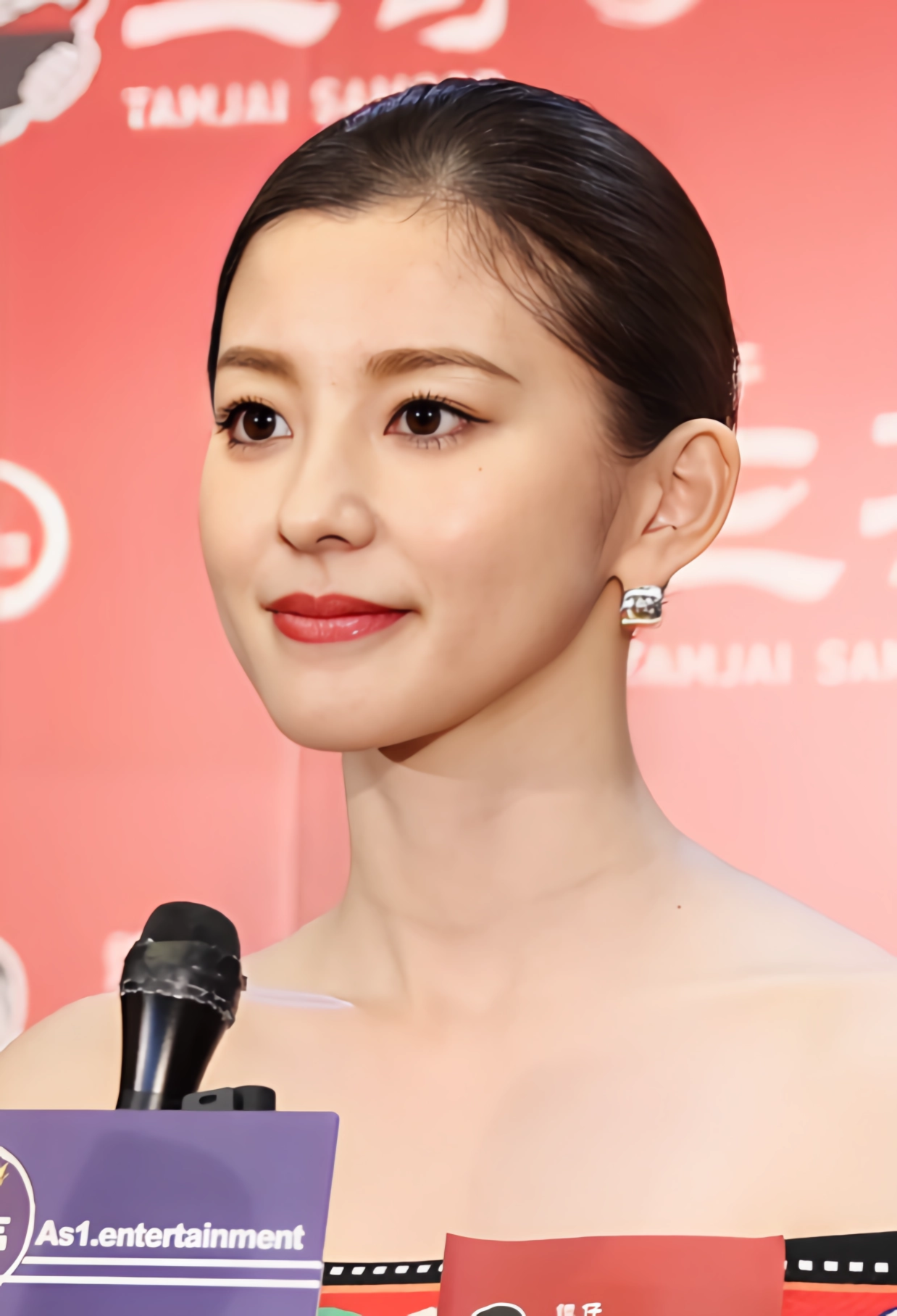
- Asahina in June 2023
- Born: 6 October 1993 (age 33); Sumoto City, Hyōgo, Japan
- Other names: Aya Kitagawa (former stage name); Aya Yamashita (married name)
- Occupations: Model; actress; youtuber
- Years active: 2013–present
- Agent: First Agent
- Spouse: Kenjiro Yamashita (m. 2021)
- Children: 2
- Modeling information
- Height: 171 cm (5 ft 7 in)
- Hair color: Black
- Eye color: Brown

YouTube information
- Channel: AYA ASAHINA official channel
- Years active: 2020–present
- Genre: Vlog
- Subscribers: 245 thousand
- Views: 23 million
- Last updated: 7 February 2026

Japanese name
- Kanji: 朝比奈 彩
- Hiragana: あさひな あや
Transcriptions
- Romanization: Asahina Aya

Aya Asahina (朝比奈 彩, Asahina Aya; born 6 October 1993) is a Japanese model, actress, and YouTuber.

== Biography ==
Asahina was born on 6 October 1993, in Sumoto City, Hyōgo Prefecture. She is the eldest of two siblings, with one younger brother.

== Career ==
After graduating from Hyogo Prefectural Sumoto Technical High School, she worked as a midwife's assistant at a local obstetrics and gynecology clinic for about a year and a half. While working at the clinic, she was approached by an acquaintance who suggested she should work as an event model. And while working there, she was scouted by the talent agency E-Smile and signed with them in 2013. From there, she began working as a race queen under the stage name "Aya Kitagawa (北川 彩)".

In 2014, she moved to Ikushima Planning Office and began working under her real name, Aya Asahina. On 13 October, she was selected as the grand prize winner at the DHC Cinderella Awards, and began working as an exclusive model for the January issue of fashion magazine Ray released in November of that year. On 25 November of the same year, she was selected as the 14th Sanai Swimsuit Image Girl.

In November 2015, Asahina was appointed as the "Support Ambassador" for her hometown of Sumoto City, Hyōgo Prefecture.

She made her acting debut in the Amazon original drama Tokyo Alice, which began streaming on 25 August 2017.

In 2019, she began working as an exclusive model for the May issue of the fashion magazine Oggi, which was released in March. In July of the same year, she starred in her first TV drama series, Runway 24 on TV Asahi.

On 6 October 2020, for her 27th birthday, she opened her YouTube channel, "Asahina Channel".

On 13 December 2022, she was appointed as the director for the Awaji Island UNESCO Association.

== Personal life ==
She admires actress Keiko Kitagawa, who is also from Hyōgo Prefecture, hence the surname Kitagawa in her former stagename.

On 26 July 2021, Asahina announced her marriage to Sandaime J Soul Brothers member Kenjiro Yamashita. On 14 December 2023, she revealed that she was expecting the couple's first child. On 25 March of the following year, the couple jointly announced the birth of their first child, a son. On April 2, 2025, she announced her second pregnancy. On June 2, Asahina shared the birth of her second child in an Instagram post.

== Filmography ==
=== Film ===
| Year | Title | Role | Notes | Ref. |
|---|---|---|---|---|
| 2020 | Grand Blue | Nanaka Kotegawa | | |
| 2021 | And So the Baton Is Passed | Beautiful Teacher | | |
| 2023 | Red Shoes | Manami Ohta | Lead role | |
| 2023 | From the End of the World | Saeki | | |

=== Television ===
| Year | Title | Role | Notes | Ref. |
|---|---|---|---|---|
| 2017 | Tokyo Alice | Sayuri Enjoji | | |
| 2018 | Osaka Loop Line Part 3: Smiles at Every Station | Rina Mizui | Episode 7 | |
| 2018 | We Are Rockets! | Nagisa Kurihara | | |
| 2018 | Yaretakamo Iinkai | Mitsuko Tsuki | | |
| 2019 | Runway 24 | Momoko Inoue | Lead role | |
| 2020 | Tokyo Metropolitan Police Department First Investigative Division Chief | Machiko Sagisawa | | |
| 2020–25 | Alice in Borderland | Hikari Kuina | Regular season 1-2; Guest season 3 | |
| 2021 | Girl Gun Lady | Mirei Hoshimiya | | |
| 2023 | Last One Standing | mysterious organization member | Season 2 | |
| 2024 | Tanabata no Kuni | Yukiko Higashimaru | | |

== Bibliography ==
=== Magazine ===
- Ray (January 2015 issue, Shufunotomosha)
- Oggi (May 2019 issue, Shogakukan)
- AndGirl (M-ON Entertainment)

=== Photobooks ===
- Aya-darake (2016, Photography by Ryuji Sue)
- Aya (2018, Photography by Koki Nishida)
