= Sho Aoyagi =

Japanese actor

- 青柳 翔
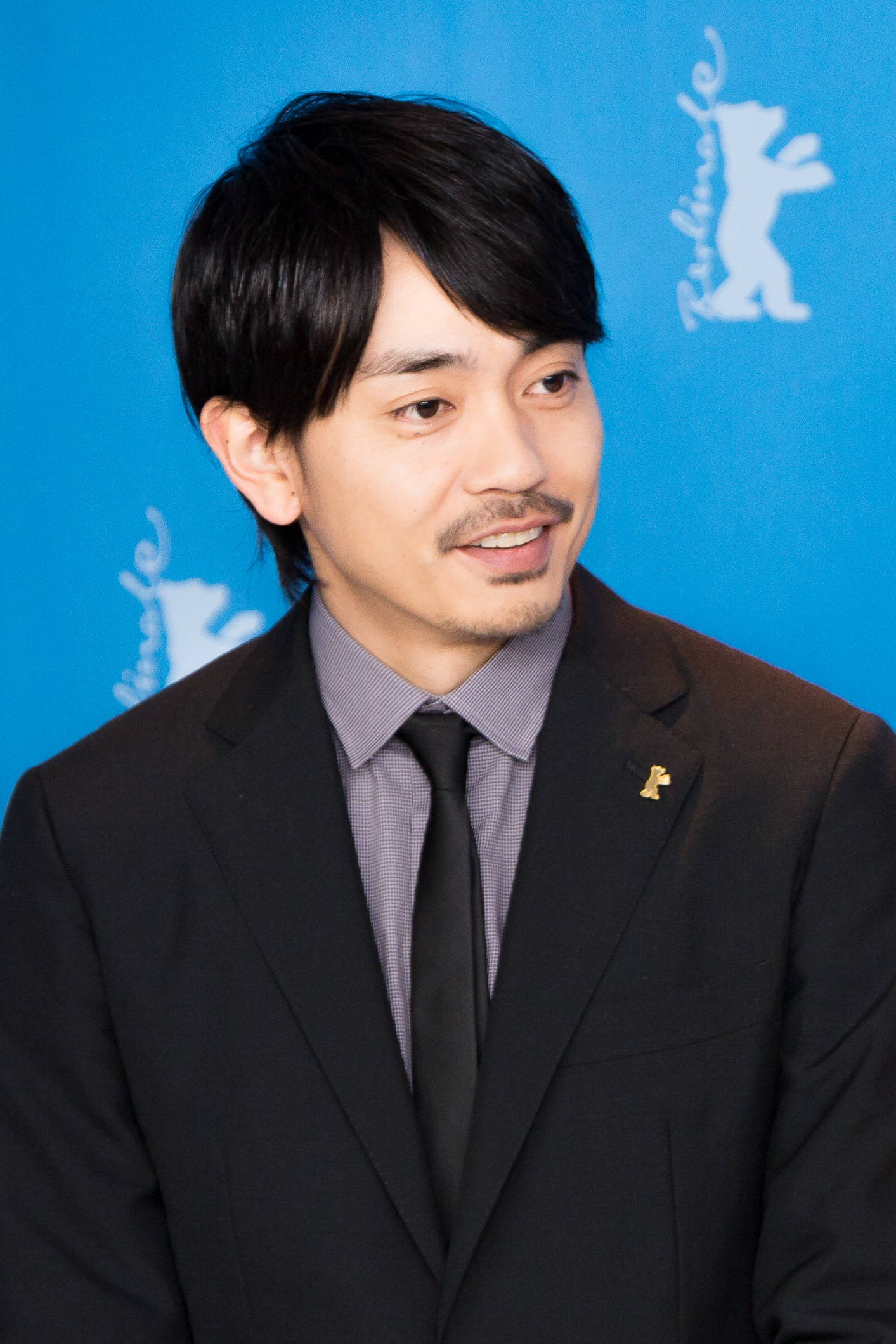
- Aoyagi at the 2017 Berlinale
- Born: April 12, 1985 (age 41); Sapporo, Hokkaido, Japan
- Occupation: Actor
- Years active: 2009–present
- Agent: LDH
- Website: Official profile

Sho Aoyagi (青柳 翔, Aoyagi Shō; born April 12, 1985) is a Japanese actor who is represented by the talent agency, LDH. He is a member of Gekidan Exile. He is well known for his role of Aguni played in Alice in borderland

== Life and career ==
In 2006, Aoyagi participated in Vocal Battle Audition. He was defeated in the secondary examination and was later invited to try a play, and chose EXPG (Exile Professional Gym) to learn about acting and singing.

In 2009, Aoyagi started his acting debut in the stage play, Attack No.1, and became a member of Gekidan Exile.

== Filmography ==
=== Television series ===
Year	Title	Role	Notes	Ref.
2011	Rokudenashi Blues	Taison Maeda	Lead role	
2020–22	Alice in Borderland	Morizono Aguni	2 seasons	
2023	Virtually Virtuous	Masahiko Suzuki	Lead role	
2024	Oshi no Ko	Masanori Shima		
2025	Anpan	Ōne	Asadora	
2026	Song of the Samurai	Nakamura Hanjiro		

=== Films ===
Year	Title	Role	Notes	Ref.
2012	Love for Beginners	Hiroshi Hananoi		
2021	Last of the Wolves	Ken'ichi Kanbara		
2022	Alivehoon	Sōichirō Kobayashi		
2022	Tyida	Tachibana		
2023	S-Friends	Kazuki Kitada	Lead role	
2023	S-Friends 2	Kazuki Kitada	Lead role	
2024	Oasis	Takeru		
2024	Paradise of Solitude			
2025	Bad Boys	Murakoshi		
2025	Blank Canvas: My So-Called Artist's Journey			
2025	S-Friends 3	Kazuki Kitada	Lead role	
2025	S-Friends 4	Kazuki Kitada	Lead role	
2026	The Specials	Shin		
2026	Tokyo Burst: Crime City	Takuya Nishijima	Japanese–Korean film	
2027	All That Exists	Shinichi Maki		
