= Ryōko =

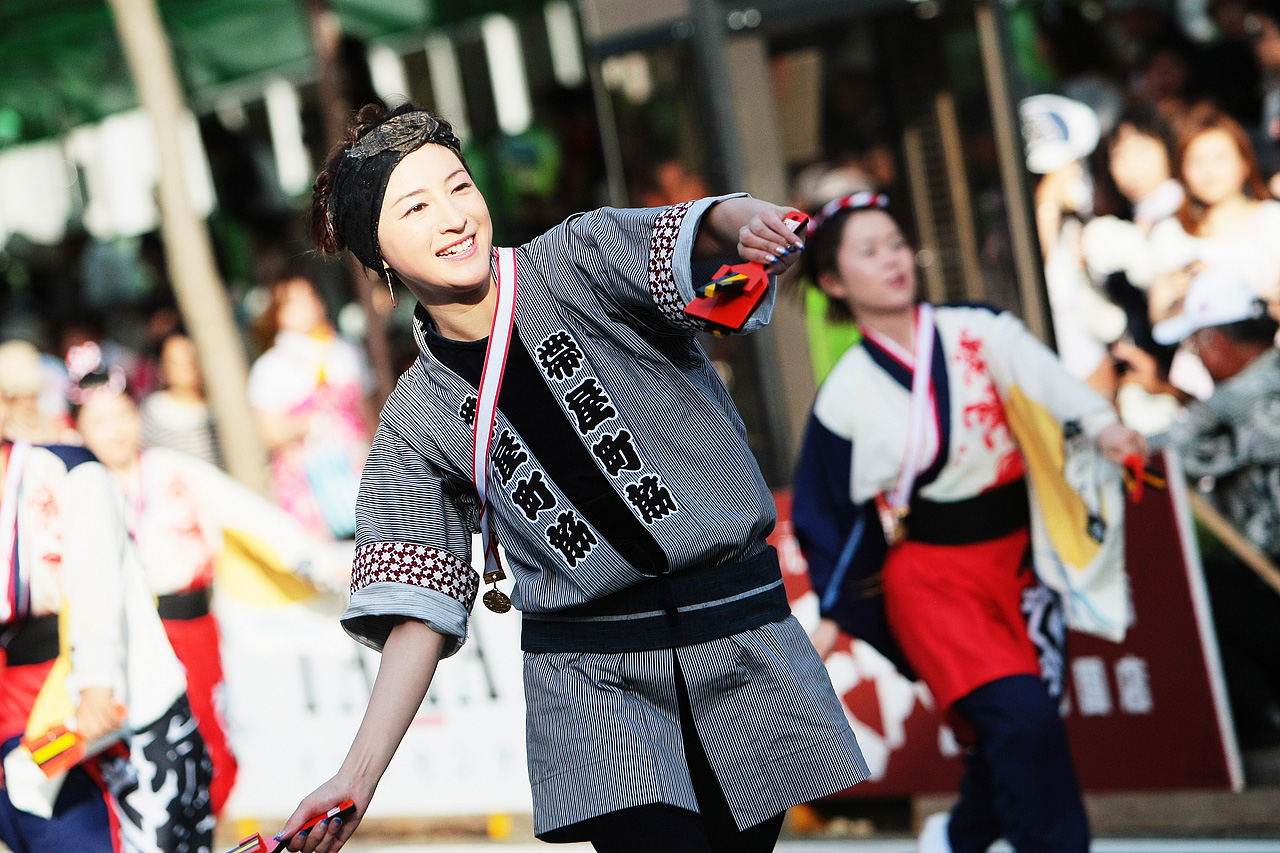
- Ryoko Hirosue, a Japanese actress and singer
- Pronunciation: Japanese pronunciation: [ɾʲoːko]
- Gender: Female

Origin
- Origin: Japanese
- Meaning: Different meanings depending on the kanji used
- Region of origin: Japan

Other names
- Related names: Ryō; Ryōka; Ryōki; Ryōzō

Ryōko, Ryouko or Ryoko is a Japanese female given name. The meanings of Ryoko vary depending on which Kanji is used to write the name.

== Written forms ==
Forms in kanji can include:

- 涼子 – "refreshing, child"
- 亮子 – "helpful, child"
- 良子 – "good, child"
- 諒子 – "understanding, child"
- 遼子 – "distant, child"

== People ==
- Ryōko Akamatsu (赤松 良子; 1929–2024), Japanese politician
- Ryōko Aoyagi (青柳 涼子; 1978–2009), Japanese actress and singer
- Ryoko Azuma (東 良子; born 1973), Japanese military officer
- Ryōko Chiba (千葉 涼子; born 1980), Japanese women's professional shogi player
- Ryoko Eda (江田 良子; born 1976), Japanese marathon runner
- Ryōko Fuda (不田 涼子; born 1986), Japanese retired tennis player
- Ryoko Fujimoto (渡辺 涼子; born 1966), Japanese judoka
- Ryōko Fujino (藤野 涼子; born 2000), Japanese actress
- Ryōko Hirosue (広末 涼子; born 1980), Japanese actress and singer
- Ryōko Kihara (樹原 涼子), Japanese composer, pianist, music educator and author
- Ryoko Kimura (木村 了子; born 1971), Japanese contemporary artist
- Ryōko Kinomiya (来宮 良子; 1931–2013), Japanese actress and voice actress
- Ryoko Kizaki (木崎 良子; born 1985), Japanese long-distance runner
- Ryoko Kobayashi (小林 涼子; born 1989), Japanese actress
- Ryoko Kui (九井 諒子), Japanese manga artist
- Ryōko Kuninaka (国仲 涼子; born 1979), Japanese actress and singer
- Ryoko Maekawa (前川 涼子), Japanese voice actress
- Ryoko Mima (美馬 怜子; born 1984), Japanese model and entertainer
- Ryōko Morishita (森下 涼子; born 1973), Japanese actress
- Ryoko Moriyama (森山 良子; born 1948), Japanese folk singer and actress
- Ryōko Mutsu (陸奥 亮子; 1856-1900), Japanese noblewoman and humanitarian
- Ryōko Nagata (永田 亮子; born 1975), Japanese freelance voice actress
- Ryoko Nakagawa (中川 諒子; born 1984), Japanese female track cyclist
- Ryoko Nakano (中野 良子; born 1950), Japanese actress
- Ryōko Ono (小野 涼子; born 1977), Japanese voice actress
- Ryoko Onozawa (小野沢 良子; born 1951), Japanese speed skater
- Ryoko Sekiguchi (関口 涼子; born 1970), Japanese poet and translator
- Ryōko Shinohara (篠原 涼子; born 1973), Japanese singer and actress
- Ryōko Shintani (新谷 良子; born 1981), Japanese voice actress and singer
- Ryoko Shiraishi (白石 涼子; born 1982), Japanese voice actress and singer
- Ryoko Suzuki (born 1970), Japanese artist
- Ryoko Takahashi (高橋 涼子; born 1973), Japanese biathlete
- Ryoko Takara (高良 亮子; born 1990), Japanese former footballer
- Ryoko Takemura (born 1976), Japanese former professional tennis player
- Ryōko Tanaka (田中 涼子; born 1973), Japanese voice actress
- Ryoko Tani (谷 亮子; born 1975), Japanese politician and retired female judoka
- Ryōko Tateishi (立石 涼子; 1951–2020), Japanese stage, movie, television and voice-over actress
- Ryoko Tokuno (徳野 涼子; born 1974), Japanese beach volleyball player
- Ryoko Uno (宇野 涼子; born 1975), Japanese former football player
- Ryoko Urakami (浦上 涼子; born 1947), Japanese former freestyle swimmer
- Ryoko Watanabe (渡辺 良子; born 1961), Japanese 1980s pink film actress and model
- Ryoko Yamagishi (山岸 凉子; born 1947), Japanese manga artist
- Ryoko Yano (矢野 良子; born 1978), Japanese basketball player
- Ryoko Yonekura (米倉 涼子; born 1975), Japanese actress and former fashion model

== Fictional characters ==
- Ryoko Asakura, from the Haruhi Suzumiya light novel and anime series
- Ryoko Kano, a playable character from Fighter's History
- Ryoko Hakubi (白眉 魎呼), a character from Tenchi Muyo!
- Ryoko Izumo from World Heroes
- Ryoko Hata (波多 量子), a character from Battle Royale II: Requiem
- Ryoko Mendo, a character from Urusei Yatsura
- Ryoko Kakyoin, a character from Kureijī Daiyamondo no Akuryō-teki Shitsuren
- Ryoko Subaru, a character from Martian Successor Nadesico
- Ryoko Kobato, a character in the Revue Starlight franchise
- Ryoko Shinonome, a character in the Schoolgirl Strikers game franchise
