= List of Kare Kano chapters =

In its English release of the Kare Kano series (right), Tokyopop declined to use most of the original primary cover art (left), choosing different images for each volume instead. The first volumes, for example, both use an image of central character Yukino Miyazawa, but in dramatically different poses. Only three volumes of the English release use the original art.

The chapters of the manga series Kare Kano were written by Masami Tsuda. The first chapter premiered in the February 1996 issue of LaLa where it was serialized monthly until its conclusion in the June 2005 issue. The series follows the romance between "perfect" student Yukino Miyazawa and her academic rival Soichiro Arima, and the relationships of the various friends they make in high school while they struggle to learn to be true to themselves.

The 101 chapters, referred to as "Acts," were collected and published in 21 tankōbon volumes by Hakusensha starting on June 5, 1996; the last volume was released on August 5, 2005. The manga was adapted into a 26-episode anime series by Gainax that aired in Japan on TV Tokyo from October 2, 1998, to March 26, 1999. The manga series is licensed for regional language releases by Editions Tonkam in France by Grupo Editorial Vid in Mexico, by Glènat España in Spain, by Dynamic Italia in Italy, by Carlsen Comics in Germany, and by Planet Manga in Brazil. Its chapters were also serialized in the French magazine Magnolia and the German magazine Daisuki.

Kare Kano was initially licensed for an English-language release by Mixx Entertainment, but the company announced it lost the license in August 2000 before publication began. In July 2001, Tokyopop announced that it had acquired the license and that it would be serializing the title in their Smile magazine starting in 2002. Smile discontinued publication that same year. Tokyopop released the first tankōbon volume of the series on January 21, 2003; the final volume was released on January 10, 2007. It was one of the first manga series that Tokyopop released in the original Japanese orientation, in which the book is read from right to left, and with the original sound effects left in place. In February 2008, Tokyopop reissued the first three volumes in a single omnibus volume.

== Volume list ==
No.	Original release date	Original ISBN	North America release date	North America ISBN
1	June 5, 1996	978-4-592-12065-0	January 21, 2003	978-1-931514-79-8
Act 1: "Her Circumstances"; Act 2: "The Secret"; Act 3: "His Circumstances"; Extra: "The Tiger and the Chameleon: A Promise for One Week"
Yukino Miyazawa is an average girl who works excessively hard to present a perfect social image. Her true identity is discovered by her rival, Soichiro Arima who blackmails her into helping him maintain his status as the perfect student. Their interactions cause Yukino to fall in love with Soichiro who likewise, discovers his true personality under his stoic facade. Soichiro begins to express angst in his new personality, believing he will become like his abusive parents. However, Yukino comforts him and Soichiro confesses his love to her in response.
2	February 5, 1997	978-4-592-12066-7	March 4, 2003	978-1-931514-80-4
Act 4: "The Day I Fell in Love"; Act 5: "School Maze"; Act 6: "His Ambition"; Act 7: "Crazy For You"
Yukino turns Soichiro down due to embarrassment but attempts to confess her feelings to him. She fails but Soichiro asks her to become his girlfriend again to which she accepts. Soichiro's friend, Hideaki Asaba, attempts to break them up as he intends to continue using Soichiro's popularity to date girls. However, Hideaki soon learns how deep Soichiro's feelings to Yukino are and decides to support their relationship. Soichiro monologues his insecurities in losing Yukino; during a late day at school, Soichiro kisses Yukino after she expresses her love towards him.
3	August 5, 1997	978-4-592-12067-4	May 6, 2003	978-1-59182-058-1
Act 8: "Rising Thunder Part 1"; Act 9: "Rising Thunder Part 2"; Act 10 "Rising Thunder Part 3"; Act 11: "That Day, Yukino Was ..."; Act 12: "Fighting Woman Part 1"
Due to their relationship, Soichiro and Yukino's grades have dropped. Their teacher orders them to end their relationship for their academic future but is rebuffed. In response, the teacher discusses the matter with their parents who instead allow them to continue their relationship. Later, Maho Izawa, Yukino's classmate, rally's the class to isolate Yukino out of envy for her facade and love life. Yukino is unfazed by their attempts and resolves to endure as her true self.
4	December 5, 1997	978-4-592-12068-1	July 8, 2003	978-1-59182-059-8
Act 13: "Fighting Woman Part 2"; Act 14: "Fighting Woman Part 3"; Act 15: "Fighting Woman Part 4"; Act 16: "At The End of the First Semester"; Extra: "Meet Me Again Tomorrow in the Forest"
Yukino's classmate, Tsubasa Shibahime, is released from the hospital and intends to regain her position as the girl Soichiro dotes on by sabotaging his relationship. Meanwhile, Yukino discovers Maho is the cause of her isolation and publicly denounces her actions; their argument leads the class to realize Maho's manipulation and become apologetic towards Yukino. Later, Tsubasa's attempts to break Yukino's relationship fails and she decides to confess to Soichiro and is rejected. Yukino begins making real friends by being herself and decides to befriend Tsubasa and Maho. As summer vacation approaches, Soichiro has to leave for a kendo tournament and makes plans to spend time with Yukino when he returns.
5	June 5, 1998	978-4-592-12069-8	September 9, 2003	978-1-59182-180-9
Act 17: "At the Beginning of Summer Break"; Act 18: "Space"; Act 19: "Western Boy, Eastern Girl"; Act 20: "Telephone Line"; Act 21: "From Here to Eternity Part 1"
Tsubasa decides to stay at Yukino's home because she is unable to accept her father's remarriage. Tsubasa shares her insecurities with Yukino about the men in her life always leaving her for love. She returns home afterwards and becomes acquainted with soon-to-be step-brother, Kazuma Ikeda. Yukino's family arranges a reunion with her grandfather from her mother's side. Her father, Hiroyuki Miyazawa, reminiscences about his childhood with her mother, Miyako Miyazawa.
6	October 5, 1998	978-4-592-12070-4	November 11, 2003	978-1-59182-181-6
Act 22: "From Here to Eternity Part 2"; Act 23: "Absence"; Act 24: "Love"; Act 25: "Shinka (Progress/Deepening)"; Act 26: "On a Clear Day, I Can See Forever"
Hiroyuki's past is highlighted along with his relationship with his grandfather who died during his high school senior year. After the funeral, Miyako promises to stay with him forever and the two marry after her graduation. Returning to the present, Soichiro's growth spurt increases his attractiveness and makes Yukino nervous. After overcoming that, Soichiro has a family reunion where his elitist family members treat him as a black sheep. As Soichiro advances his relationship with Yukino, he is confronted by his personified trauma who warns him his happiness with Yukino will be unable to stop him.
7	March 5, 1999	978-4-592-12071-1	January 6, 2004	978-1-59182-472-5
Act 27: "14 Days: 1"; Act 28: "14 Days: Boy T"; Act 29: "14 Days: Tangled Threads"; Act 30: "14 Days: The Beginning"; Act 31: "14 Days: After School"; Act 32: "14 Days: Sunlight and Moonlight"
Yukino's school has fourteen days to prepare for a cultural festival; Yukino and her friends decide to script and act out a play for it. Meanwhile, Takefumi Tonami transfers to the school and is intent on taking revenge on Yukino's friend, Tsubaki Sakura, who belittled him during their childhood; the two begin a rivalry and Takefumi becomes compelled and kisses her.
8	September 4, 1999	978-4-592-12072-8	March 2, 2004	978-1-59182-473-2
Act 33: "14 Days: I Want To Know"; Act 34: "14 Days: The One I Love"; Act 35: "14 Days: Temperature 31°C"; Act 36: "14 Days: Hurricane"; Extra: "The Raging King"
Takefumi realizes his growing love towards Tsubaka and that his hatred towards her was because he was unable to gain her attention. Later, Soichiro escorts Yukino home during a hurricane and is invited to stay at her house. There, he monologues how the love in that house keeps his trauma at bay.
9	March 4, 2000	978-4-592-12073-5	May 4, 2004	978-1-59182-474-9
Act 37: "14 Days: The Culture Festival Begins"; Act 38: "The Culture Festival 1"; Act 39: "The Culture Festival 2"; Act 40: "The Culture Festival 3"; Act 41: "The Culture Festival 4"; Act 42: "The Wheels of Fate"
The culture festival begins and Yukino's and her friends host a play about a genius scientist who builds androids due to his social anxiety; Soichiro leaves when the scientist monologues how his past haunts him and how he is unable to love himself due to relating to the character. After the play, Takefumi confesses to Tsubaki about his past feelings and the two promise to travel the world together after graduation. Meanwhile, Soichiro realizes he is unable to monopolize Yukino's attention completely; his personified trauma then mockingly appears and hugs him.
10	October 5, 2000	978-4-592-12074-2	July 6, 2004	978-1-59182-475-6
Act 43: "A Comfortable Room 1"; Act 44: "A comfortable Room 2"; Act 45: "Go Go Kyoto 1"; Act 46: "Go Go Kyoto 2"; Act 47: "Go Go Kyoto 3"; Extra: "Act Zero"
Maho reminisces about her first meeting with her adult boyfriend, Yusuke Takeshi. Afterwards, Yukino's class goes to Kyoto and she comes down with a fever on the trip. During a fever dream, Yukino sees Soichiro who has taken the appearance of his trauma before waking up. She recovers and enjoys the rest of her trip before they return home.
11	July 5, 2001	978-4-592-12075-9	September 7, 2004	978-1-59182-476-3
Act 48: "Beautiful Days"; Act 49: "Rain"; Act 50: "Sing a Song"; Act 51: "Live"; Act 52: "Sleeping Beauty"; Act 53: "Love"
Kazuma's career as a singer for the indie band, Yin and Yang, is progressing and his growing attraction to Tsubasa is highlighted. Kazuma recognizes Tsubasa's trauma of men and realizing he is unable to contain his feelings for her, leaves the house.
12	October 5, 2001	978-4-592-12076-6	November 2, 2004	978-1-59182-477-0
Act 54: "Born"; Act 55: "Yin and Yang"; Act 56: "Tsubasa"; Act 57: "You Light Up My Life"; Act 58: "Rika's Life"; Extra: "Ushio-kun and Atsuya-kun"
Tsubasa is traumatized by Kazuma's leaving and is hospitalized after a mental breakdown. Kazuma confesses his feelings towards her but she rejects due to her trauma. Tsubasa comes across a Yin and Yang music named after her; She learns of the song's lyrics, overcomes her trauma, and meets Kazuma. Kazuma proposes marriage to her and she accepts. Later, Yukino's friend, Rika Sena, monologues her life.
13	May 2, 2002	978-4-592-12077-3	January 11, 2005	978-1-59532-587-7
Act 59: "And Then, Time Moved On"; Act 60: "1"; Act 61: "Perfect World"; Act 62: "Footsteps"; Act 63: "Away From You"
A time skip occurs and Yukino and her friends are in their final year of school. Yukino and her friends discuss their future dreams and goals. Meanwhile, Soichiro's grades and reputation in kendo earns him a television interview which grants him favor with his estranged family members. Soichiro intends to inherit the Arima family name in order to take revenge on them for tortuing him as a child and for exiling his uncle and aunt, his current adoptive parents. Meanwhile, Soichiro's birth mother, Ryoko, sees the interview and intends to extort him.
14	September 5, 2002	978-4-592-12078-0	March 8, 2005	978-1-59532-588-4
Act 64: "Broken"; Act 65: "Preface"; Act 66: "Crushed"; Act 67: "Sudden"; Act 68: "Pandora"
Ryoko plays on Soichiro's childhood amnesia in order to blackmail him into moving in with her. Yukino notices Soichiro's behavior and learns that he had been putting up the facade of a perfect boyfriend for her. Soichiro stands up to Ryoko's blackmail and regains his lost memories in the process.
15	February 5, 2003	978-4-592-12079-7	May 10, 2005	978-1-59532-589-1
Act 69: "His Sonnet"; Act 70: "The Sonnet of the Other Him"; Act 71: "Her Sonnet"; Act 72: "His and Her Sonnet"; Act 73: "The End of the Night"
Soichiro, as an infant, experienced neglect and physical abuse from Ryoko; his experience caused him to subconsciously hide his feelings and to put on a facade of being perfect. The mental trauma causes Soichiro to behave self-destructively. Yukino is able to push past Soichiro's cold personality and makes him realize that while his trauma prevented him from loving someone, it was what he truly wished for.
16	July 5, 2003	978-4-592-17860-6	July 12, 2005	978-1-59532-590-7
Act 74: "Days Passed in a Dream"; Act 75: "Cycle"; Act 76: "Path of Light"; Act 77: "Mother"; Act 78: "Bird That Flies Through the Darkness"
Soichiro shares his past with Yukino who, to his disbelief, resolves to stay with him. Soichiro confronts Ryoko and is able to stand his ground, forcing her to give up on her plans.
17	December 5, 2003	978-4-592-17861-3	September 6, 2005	978-1-59532-591-4
Act 79: "Prelude"; Act 80: "Pianist"; Act 81: "Concert"; Act 82: "Tempest"; Act 83: "A Boy and a Man"
Yukino spends time with Soichiro's family at their snow cottage. Later, Soichiro's birth father, Reiji Arima, appears on TV and announces his piano concert tour in Japan. At the same time, Yukino wonders how she will take Soichiro she is pregnant. Reiji travels to Japan and takes Soichiro with him on his concert tour. The two bond and appear together in front of the media.
18	May 1, 2004	978-4-592-17862-0	December 13, 2005	978-1-59532-592-1
Act 84: "La Vie en Rose"; Act 85: "Cadenza"; Act 86: "Nocturne"; Act 87: "Game"; Act 88: "The Way We Were"
Shortly after, Reiji tells Soichiro to forget about him and return home. Soichiro's adoptive father, Shouji Arima, explains Reiji's past as a prodigy and how it caused him to be isolated in the Arima family.
19	October 5, 2004	978-4-592-17863-7	April 7, 2006	978-1-59816-182-3
Act 89: "Brothers"; Act 90: "Spiral"; Act 91: "Son"; Act 92: "Long Journey"; Act 93: "Atonement"
In response to his treatment, Reiji became a delinquent but is set on the right path by Shouji. However, he discovers he fathered Soichiro whom Ryoko holds hostage to. Shouji, blaming Reiji for Soichiro's suffering, cuts ties with Reiji and adopts Soichiro as his own. Returning to the present, Ryoko attempts to use Soichiro in order to contact Reiji for money. Reiji then holds Ryoko at gun point to avenge Soichiro's suffering.
20	March 5, 2005	978-4-592-17864-4	August 8, 2006	978-1-59816-183-0
Act 94: "Salvation"; Act 95: "The End of the Journey"; Act 96: "Shizune's Story"; Act 97: "Bright Future"; Act 98: "Shining Star"
Soichiro stops Reiji, explaining he had overcome his trauma and is just happy knowing Reiji loved him; afterwards, Shouji amends his relationship with Reiji. Yukino tells Soichiro she is pregnant and he proposes to her. The two announce their intention to marry and have the baby to their parents.
21	August 5, 2005	978-4-592-17865-1	January 10, 2007	978-1-59816-840-2
Act 99: "The Story Untold"; Act 100: "Graduation Nears"; Act 101: "Spring and March"
Yukino and Soichiro announce her pregnancy to her friends. Hideaki senses the baby is a girl and that she will become his soulmate in the future. Sixteen years later, the characters' life is highlighted and Yukino's eldest daughter, Sakura, confesses her love to Hideaki.

== See also ==
- List of Kare Kano characters
