= List of Kare Kano characters =

This is a list of the main characters from a manga series called Kare Kano and its anime adaptation. Kare Kano is a Japanese manga series written and illustrated by Masami Tsuda. It was serialized in LaLa from 1996 to 2005 and collected in 21 tankōbon volumes by Hakusensha.

== Miyazawa family ==
=== Yukino Miyazawa ===
Yukino Miyazawa

Voiced by: Atsuko Enomoto (Japanese); Veronica Taylor (English)

Yukino Miyazawa (宮沢 雪野, Miyazawa Yukino), the female protagonist of the series, is a 15 year old who is a seemingly smart, attractive, athletic, and talented model student. Both her male and female peers express admiration for her, often asking her for help and commenting about her model-like features and characteristics.

However, her "perfect" exterior is merely a façade to hide the fact that everything she does is done solely to receive praise from others, and that she acts in a slovenly manner at home. She is a self-professed "queen of vanity", having been that way ever since childhood when her parents would praise her for the slightest actions. Yukino once practiced playing her recorder all night and ended up almost vomiting blood due to overexertion. She is described as the "anti-Girl Next Door" in an article by Newtype USA because of her perfectionism and deceitfulness. With so much praise, however, she never realized her lack of real friends outside of her family and was considered by her peers as a semi-approachable "guest". Everything changes when Yukino meets Soichiro Arima, another model student, who beats her high school entrance exam score, and is even more popular and athletic than Yukino. Yukino is envious of her rival Soichiro and works hard to top his grades. When Soichiro confesses that he has a crush on her, she rejects him and laughs about it afterwards. But her observant sister Kano points out that Yukino's rivalry with him is born out of admiration. This revelation is useless, however, as Yukino accidentally lets her guard down and Soichiro discovers her real self.

After discovering that Soichiro is also maintaining a model-student façade for his own reasons, they become very good friends. Yukino resolves to abandon her fake ways and become true to herself, though she initially has some trouble letting go of her lifelong habit of pretend-perfection. Eventually, she is able to open her true self to others and earns real friends besides Soichiro. She also believes that Reiji Arima is quite handsome and wishes that Soichiro will also become that handsome. She even accepts an expensive gift from her future father-in-law. She is also depressed when she discovers that Soichiro had been lying to her about his mother and Asaba informs her of that fact. During her senior year in high school, Yukino becomes pregnant. She marries Soichiro after graduation, marrying at a young age as her parents did. Although her apparent goal in high school was to become a politician or a lawyer, it is later revealed that she wanted to be a doctor. She put the dream aside because it was financially out of her family's reach, and because Soichiro and Maho both wanted to be doctors too. After graduating high school, she becomes a housewife for a few years before going to medical school. She eventually becomes a doctor at a hospital run by the Arima family, specializing in reconstructive surgery. Sixteen years later, she is the mother of three children, a daughter named Sakura and two sons named Suoh and Ai who are fraternal twins.

=== Tsukino Miyazawa ===
Voiced by: Yuki Watanabe (Japanese); Jessica Calvello (English)
Tsukino Miyazawa (宮沢 月野, Miyazawa Tsukino) is the middle daughter of the Miyazawa family who tends to tease Kano, the youngest daughter. Neither Tsukino no Kano understands Yukino's quest for perfection. But they love her very much and are constantly begging her to play with them. At the end of the series, Tsukino is shown to have become a talented tennis player. However, she had to retire from professional tennis due to injury, after which she became a reputable coach. She does not have a large role in the story.

=== Kano Miyazawa ===
Voiced by: Maria Yamamoto (Japanese); Megan Hollingshead (English)
Kano Miyazawa (宮沢 花野, Miyazawa Kano) is the youngest of the three Miyazawa daughters, Kano is known for her shōjo manga and novel obsessions. She uses the knowledge from her love stories to help out Yukino when she is in a psychological pinch. Later, she becomes an editor of her favorite author, Aya Sawada, one of Yukino's high school friends.

=== Hiroyuki and Miyako Miyazawa ===
Hiroyuki Voiced by: Takeshi Kusao (Japanese); Pete Zarustica (English)
Miyako Voiced by: Yuka Koyama (Japanese); Rachael Lillis (English)
Hiroyuki Miyazawa (宮沢 洋之, Miyazawa Hiroyuki) and Miyako Miyazawa (宮沢 都香(みやこ), Miyazawa Miyako) are Yukino, Tsukino and Kano's parents. They met as children and married right after high school, a continuous source of consternation for Miyako's father. When Hiroyuki asked to marry Miyako, her father beat him black-and-blue. Hiroyuki still bickers with his father-in-law, grumbling that the old fool could not let go of his daughter. His father-in-law was a policeman, and Hiroyuki encountered him under unfavorable conditions; he was caught while he and his friends were forcibly riding Miyako's new bike. Hiroyuki was an orphan who was raised by his grandfather, and values family very highly, a feeling that Miyako shares with him. Miyako understands his pain as she had lost her mother as a child. He loves his three daughters very much, and is frequently wearing a T-shirt that says "Daughter Love". His daughters, on the other hand, frequently tease him or treat him a little rudely, e.g., "Shut up, Dad!" after which he sulks comically. One of these infamous T-shirts ends up being worn by Soichiro to go back home in, when he is caught in a storm to walk Yukino home. Hiroyuki and Miyako are easygoing parents who believe in allowing their children to make their own decisions about their lives. The two were childhood friends, and eventually fell in love, and their relationship was strengthened when Hiroyuki's grandfather died.

== Arima family ==
=== Soichiro Arima ===
Soichiro Arima in the anime

Voiced by: Chihiro Suzuki (Japanese); Christopher Nicholas Yates (English)

Soichiro Arima (有馬 総一郎, Arima Sōichirō), the male protagonist of the series, starts out as Yukino's rival at school, and ends up as her boyfriend and eventual husband. A handsome and popular boy, Soichiro excels at kendo and becomes a national champion. He is at first smitten with Yukino, unaware that she secretly hates him and constantly tries to compete with him. After unwittingly discovering that Yukino is not the model student everyone thinks she is, Soichiro blackmails her into doing his school work so that he can spend more time with her. After resolving the issue and becoming each other's first true friend, they eventually fall in love. Yukino learns that Soichiro, like her, is making an effort to "be perfect" for a reason. While Yukino is motivated by praise and vanity, Soichiro is trying to cover his "real" self, a self damaged by childhood trauma that he fears may be destructive. Yukino and Soichiro were able to find emotional sanctuary in each other. While Soichiro comes from a distinguished family of doctors, he was abandoned by his parents, who were the family's disgrace, and raised by his uncle and aunt. Fearing that he may turn "bad" like his parents, he is always trying to hide behind a mask and is constantly fighting his own demons. As with Yukino, he becomes more in touch with his true self as he falls in love with her. However, he is apprehensive of the other feelings what emerge along with his love, such as his increasing jealousy of Yukino's other friendships, her activities and her life without him. When Yukino unknowingly damages Soichiro's bond to her, he finds himself becoming jealous and afraid. So he begins to wear another facade that he hopes will fool her and protect her from his "ugly" self.

After a lifetime of striving to be "perfect", Soichiro's dark side begins to manifest itself through vengeful feelings against those that hurt him in his family, and he realizes that he has the ability to be cold and cruel. One aspect is his possessiveness of Yukino, hating for anyone but himself to be close with her. Hideaki told Takefumi that the only reason Hideaki was allowed to be friends with Yukino was because Soichiro knew that Hideaki would never fall in love with Yukino, and she would never fall in love with him. When the charade reaches such a critical point that it threatens his relationship with Yukino, she steps up to save him by opening him to a true and complete love. After a number of violent outbursts (one of which has him making love to her in the school library rather suddenly, which later has him thinking it was a rape and almost drives him mad) Soichiro finally understands that to love, he must be willing to trust and be trusted, even enduring the suffering that comes out of love. Yukino is able to convince Soichiro that she truly loves him for who he is, and that she is willing to support and suffer for him. From that point on, Soichiro truly and completely opens up to Yukino, his friends, and his beloved adopted parents. Soichiro's union with Yukino has come full circle, as both are finally free from the oppression of the conflict within themselves. Even though Soichiro cannot forget the past, he no longer allows it to control and hurt himself or anyone else.

In their senior year of high school, Yukino becomes pregnant, and after getting over the initial shock, he tells her that he is happy of the news and marries her. Sixteen years later, they have three children together; their oldest child is a daughter named Sakura, a beautiful girl who resembles him in looks and talent, and their last two children are sons named Suoh and Ai, who are fraternal twins. Although his original ambition was to follow his family's profession and become a doctor, he follows his childhood dream and becomes a policeman. He eventually becomes a highly decorated police inspector and is preparing to sit for the exams of a Commissioner's promotion (at the insistence of his superiors) at the age of 30.

Soichiro was also reunited with his father, Reiji Arima, a famous jazz pianist who lives in New York but returned to Japan for a concert. Reiji threatens to harm Yukino, upsetting Soichiro, and he holds a false pistol to his forehead in the center of a park. After spending 10 days together, both father and son grew fond of each other and reestablished their bond. Soichiro spends most of his time assisting his father, and Reiji rewards him by taking him to a nice dinner with Yukino. Unfortunately, he tells Soichiro to go home because he does not feel like a father and would be better off without him. When Soichiro and Yukino are ambushed by Ryoko, wanting to meet with Reiji, he comes to their aid. He leaves for New York once the event is over, but promises to return to Soichiro the following summer. Reconnecting with his father helps Soichiro deal with his problems and heal the wounds of his childhood.

=== Reiji Arima ===
Reiji Arima (有馬 怜司, Arima Reiji) is Soichiro Arima's estranged father. Reiji was the illegitimate but favored son of the Arima patriarch and his mistress. Reiji's mother committed suicide by drowning herself. She attempted to take Reiji with her. Reiji kicked her in the face to save himself, a horrific memory that haunts him for the rest of his life. He was an intelligent but twisted child and teenager, and grew close to his much older brother, Soji, over time. His relationship with Soji's wife is cold, calling her drab and old because of his jealousy that she is married to his beloved older brother. He also manages to befriend Yukino, who mistakes him for Soichiro. Although a talented musician, he grows to lead a life of a delinquent and is seduced by a beautiful gold-digger named Ryoko, who gets pregnant. Reiji names the baby Sōichirō after his brother Souji, but has nothing else to do with the child. Years later, Reiji learns Ryoko was abusing his son and had abandoned him. Unable to care for him, Reiji gives the child to Souji and moves to New York City. There he becomes a famous jazz pianist. He returns to Japan when Soichiro is in high school and "kidnaps" him to force him to spend ten days with him and later helps protect him from Ryoko. He threatens to kill her to keep her from hurting Soichiro again, eventually allowing her to live when Soichiro stops him from shooting. In the manga, it is revealed that the person Reiji looks up to and respects the most is his brother Souji and he does not want to look bad when he is with Souji.

=== Souji Arima ===
Voiced by: Yuji Fujishiro (Japanese); Bill Rogers (English)
Souji Arima (有馬 総司, Arima Sōji) is Soichiro's uncle and his adoptive father. He is depicted as being gentle in nature, but has shown strong resolve when the situation demanded it. He is the head of a prestigious hospital, and has followed the family tradition of becoming esteemed doctors. He is happily married to a wife whom he has known from childhood. Her prolonged illnesses were the reason they met, but they have left her unable to have children. After Soichiro is abandoned by his parents, Souji and his wife raise and love the child as their own. Though respectful to his older sister Eiko, Souji does not hesitate to defend Soichiro whenever she says something insulting about him (which is often). He was originally willing to give up his share of the Arima estate. However, when he learned that his father had fathered his half-brother Reiji with a mistress, Souji decided to keep his inheritance to prevent Eiko from leaving nothing to Reiji. Although Reiji is an illegitimate child, and shunned by many members of the Arima family, Souji is always kind to his half-brother. He deeply regrets having coldly told Reiji not to come back and throw Soichiro's life in turmoil again when he left Soichiro behind, and is happy when they are at last reconciled and share a drink together.

=== Eiko Arima ===
Voiced by: Kazuko Yanaga (Japanese); Kristen Nelson (English)
Eiko Arima (有馬 詠子, Arima Eiko) is Soichiro's aunt, and Souji's elder sister. As the eldest child of the Arima family, Eiko wanted to follow her family's profession and become a doctor, but her father told her girls should not become doctors. This turned her cold and distant. She was incensed when she learned her father had a mistress and her half-brother Reiji was born. Her father's doting on Reiji left her bitter and caused her to hate both Reiji, and later his son Soichiro. Despite this, she approves of Yukino after learning of her plan to study medicine after her marriage, she merely nodded her approval and reached for a cup of tea. Souji recognized that Eiko appreciates Yukino's ambition as similar to her own when she was young.

== Other characters ==
=== Hideaki Asaba ===
Voiced by: Atsushi Kisaichi (Japanese); Liam O'Brien (English)
Hideaki Asaba (浅葉 秀明, Asaba Hideaki) is Yukino and Soichiro's lazy and girl-crazy best friend, very handsome and popular. Although bright enough to be accepted to the selective Hokuei High School, Hideaki is a terrible student, and spends most of his time surfing or chasing girls. Hideaki and Soichiro are considered the two most handsome boys in school, but while Soichiro is largely indifferent to the attention, Hideaki makes the most of it. During their school's annual culture-fest, Hideaki's class mounts a "Hideaki Asaba Dinner Show" which is a big hit with all the girls, but gives Yukino and Soichiro the creeps. Despite his easygoing nature, Hideaki had a tumultuous homelife before moving into his own apartment. He frequently argued with his father and was shunned by him, due in part that Hideaki's nature was too similar to his abusive grandfather. His father never hesitated to exclude him from family outings, even taking joy in it. Due to this dark past, Hideaki is one of the few people who truly understands Soichiro's dark side. In fact he frequently states that he would love to marry Soichiro, if only Soichiro was a girl. During Yukino and Soichiro's relationship crisis during their senior year, Asaba tells her that only she could reconcile Soichiro's heart. At the end of the series, Hideaki has become a famous painter, specializing in drawing female portraits in which the subject appears five times prettier. Maho realizes that this is because Hideaki truly sees women to be five times prettier than they actually are – which explains why he is so in love with all of them. Despite loving women in general, Hideaki has never settled down or married, waiting for someone. When he learns Yukino is pregnant, he declares the baby will be the girl he has been waiting for. Sixteen years later, Hideaki is the surrogate father of the three Arima children, and the child was indeed a girl, their oldest daughter Sakura. In volume 21, the first chapter is narrated by an unnamed character, who loves him. His father is often sneering at him, and his first kiss is the unnamed character. Hideaki is torn about his fatherlike relationship to her as well as her young age, however Sakura takes the initiative and confesses her love for him and her intention to be his.

=== Tsubasa Shibahime ===
Voiced by: Mayumi Shintani (Japanese); Lisa Ortiz (English)
Tsubasa Shibahime (芝姫 つばさ, Shibahime Tsubasa) is a petite, beautiful girl, who has loved Soichiro since they attended middle school together. Although she studied hard so she could attend Hokuei High School with Soichiro, a bad skateboarding accident prevents her from starting school with everyone else. In the past, Tsubasa tried to confess her love to Soichiro several times, but Soichiro was comically oblivious. So she settled for being treated as Soichiro's younger sister as long as his affections were not occupied by another girl. But upon learning that Soichiro has a girlfriend, she becomes insanely jealous and increasingly resentful of Yukino. After getting into an altercation with Yukino, they become good friends. Among their group of friends, she is the baby of the group and Yukino cannot resist her cuteness, often wanting to dress her up like a doll. Tsubasa's mother died while she was giving birth to her, so she was raised by her indulgent father, and it was her loneliness that she had in common with Soichiro. In an episode Tsubasa is very possessive of her father and throws a fit when she learns that her father plans to remarry a woman named Izumi, her nurse at the hospital where she was treated for her skateboarding accident. She feels especially abandoned and hurt because she feels that she has just lost Soichiro to Yukino. Tsubasa changes her mind about the marriage after she meets Kazuma, her step brother-to-be, and realizes that Kazuma understands the longing for a family, as he is also the only child of a single parent, and knows the pain of coming home to an empty home every day. Later on in the manga, Kazuma would fall in love with Tsubasa and they end up getting married. Tsubasa was a regular recurring character from episodes 9 through 13 (even being the main focus in episodes 12 and 13) but afterwards she would be used mainly for comic relief with only the occasional line of dialogue peppered in.

=== Tsubaki Sakura ===
Voiced by: Saeko Chiba (Japanese); Lea Lane (English)
Tsubaki Sakura (佐倉 椿, Sakura Tsubaki) is one of Yukino's friends. A talented athlete, her tomboyish prankster attitude eventually catches up to her in the person of a person from her past, Tonami Takefumi. Initially, she could not recognise Takefumi, who underwent a complete transformation during the three years he was away. Takefumi uses this as leverage in his quest to get revenge on Tsubaki. As time goes by, Tsubaki's never-say-die attitude and Takefumi's realisation that he is in love with Tsubaki resolves the conflict between them. After graduating from high school, the two leave Japan to travel the world together. Tsubaki studies at an Egyptian university and eventually becomes a professor of archaeology at an American university. She uses her instincts and capabilities to discover many archaeological sites.

=== Aya Sawada ===
Voiced by: Yukiko Motoya (Japanese); Rachael Lillis (English)
Aya Sawada (沢田 亜弥, Sawada Aya) is a published writer at a very young age, Aya is obsessive compulsive when it comes to her writing. She writes a play for the newly formed school drama club, and chases down Maho and Yukino to play lead parts. Although both Maho and Yukino run away at first, Yukino changes her mind after reading the play. Yukino's sister Kano is a big fan of Aya's books. Aya occasionally smokes despite her young age, which Rika and Yukino disapprove of. Later, Aya continues her career as a writer. But like in her younger days, she rushes like mad to meet publishing deadlines due to her forgetfulness. Her capable editor is Kano Miyazawa, Yukino's younger sister.

=== Rika Sena ===
Voiced by: Yukari Fukui (Japanese); Debora Rabbai (English)
Rika Sena (瀬奈 りか, Sena Rika) is a gifted seamstress and craftswoman. A self-effacing person, Rika considers her life as average, and the least distinguished among her friends, but she is happy to be behind the scenes. She works on costumes for school plays and events. She has been best friends with Aya since childhood, and she and Aya have a strange dynamic where Aya will do something selfish towards Rika, but Rika's sheer goodness will shame Aya ... and the cycle continues. At some point before the cultural festival, Yukino asked Rika if she had a special someone in mind, and Rika responded to with a denial and blush. Yukino eventually realizes that Rika has a crush on Aya's older brother Kyo when she again blushed while talking to him. However, Aya has been aware of her friend's and brother's mutual infatuation for some time, and after the cultural festival was over, she supposedly stayed behind to do some work so that Rika and her brother would have dinner without her. Though Rika sees herself as the most average and unimpressive member of the group, Tsubaki points out that Rika is actually the most popular with the "regular guys", i.e. the kind that would never tell a girl how they feel. The men in the classroom tense up, confirming Tsubaki's theory. As such, the only one who sees Rika as unimpressive is Rika herself. With her sewing skills, Rika eventually becomes the designated seamstress of Tsubasa's father, a famous fashion designer, who she is a big fan of, and is married to Aya's brother Kyo, which was proved by her change of name to Rika Sawada in the last chapter.

=== Maho Izawa ===
Voiced by: Junko Noda (Japanese); Carol Jacobanis (English)
Maho Izawa (井沢 真秀, Izawa Maho) is the star of her middle school, but she falls out of the limelight when she arrives at Hokuei High School because of Yukino. Maho becomes jealous of Yukino, which mirrors Yukino's jealousy of Soichiro. Maho also mentions that she had feelings of love for Yukino when she first saw her. That feeling changed when she found out that Yukino was not as perfect as she made everyone believe. Her jealousy becomes hatred and she turns the entire class against Yukino. However, it eventually fails and the class turns on Maho. Yukino takes the high road and makes the first efforts to make Maho her friend. Maho soon becomes part of Yukino's circle of friends, and although she maintains her aloof attitude, she also eventually learns to cherish the friendships. During her last year as a middle school student, she falls in love with a 28-year-old dentist named Yusuke Takashi, and becomes his girlfriend during high school. She was aware of the "headaches" he had when he rejected her was because Takashi was worrying about Maho and her well-being. She never gave up on him, and when he brought up these "headaches" again, Maho repeated her intended profession—neurosurgery. From that point on, they were together. Takashi is a bit teasing of Maho, but she is aware that the things he does as her boyfriend are to her benefit and of his love. She later marries him, and becomes a doctor at the same hospital as Yukino, as a neurosurgeon.

=== Kazuma Ikeda ===
Voiced by: Akira Ishida (Japanese); Buddy Woodward (English)
Kazuma Ikeda (池田 一馬, Ikeda Kazuma) is the son of the woman whom Tsubasa's father is dating. Tsubasa's step younger brother. He is a member, along with the minor characters Martin, Joker, Ushio and Atsuya, of an indie-rock band (called "Yin & Yang") Because of his bleached hair and skull jewelry, he is initially looked upon with suspicion by Tsubasa. Because he wants his mother to be happy and eager to have a little sister, he has no objections to their marriage. However, he makes the mistake of assuming that Tsubasa is an elementary school student due to her short stature, when in fact she is a month older than he is, causing Tsubasa to have a spectacular meltdown. Although their first meeting goes badly, Kazuma runs into Tsubasa a few days later. He saves her from a "dirty old man with money", but when the police arrive, they assume that he is the bad guy due to his appearance, so Tsubasa has to save him. After spending some time together they realize that they are similar in their loneliness, and immediately bond like a real brother and sister. After their parents marry and move in together, Tsubasa and Kazuma become inseparable. Seeing their close bond during their move-in day, Tsubasa's father presciently wonders whether step-siblings can marry. His big-brother-like qualities are what naturally brings him and Arima together as friends, with the latter very much impressed with Kazuma's musical talent. Arima and Kazuma easily relate to each other without any trace of friction, which elicits a bit of jealousy from Hideaki and Takefumi. Kazuma falls in love with Tsubasa but she feels he chose music over her. He leaves home, but writes many love songs about Tsubasa, which become huge hits for his band in their first label album, which they all agree to call 'Tsubasa'. After working through whether he loves Tsubasa as a sister or as a woman, he eventually returns home, and immediately asks Tsubasa to marry him. They marry soon after Tsubasa's high school graduation. The friend group eventually reunite at a Yin & Yang concert 16 years after graduation.

=== Takefumi Tonami ===
Voiced by: Nozomu Sasaki (Japanese); Ed Paul (English)
Takefumi Tonami (十波 健史, Tōnami Takefumi) was a fat, sickly, and spoiled child who was constantly picked on in elementary school. He was somewhat protected by the tomboy Tsubaki, who, while protecting him from other bullies, would bully Takefumi herself. When he asked Tsubaki why she paid attention to him, she told him that a teacher had asked her to look after him. After hearing this, Takefumi is humiliated as he had never been in his life; he is humiliated because he had believed that he was somehow special to Tsubaki, but he realized that she did not care about him at all, and was just obeying a teacher's request. He transferred to a school in another city, but returns years later to attend Hokuei High School with the other characters. When he returns to Tokyo, he had lost weight, become healthy, tall, handsome, and completely unrecognizable. He intends to take advantage of the fact that no one recognizes him to get revenge on Tsubaki. Although he butts heads with Yukino at first, she recognizes that his efforts to transform himself are similar to her own obsession with her image, and they share a mutual, albeit begrudging, admiration. He later realizes that his feelings for Tsubaki are actually love, and that the source of his seeming hatred for her was because he felt rejected by her. After he realizes this, he finds out that Tsubaki likes him, too, and they become a couple. However, he is conflicted by the fact that he loves her free nature but it is this that keeps her from being tied down in a relationship. In the end, the two are able to resolve the problem and stay together. Immediately after their high school graduation ceremony, they fly together to Egypt from Narita Airport. Later, he travels around the world with Tsubaki, investigating archaeological remains. Along the way, he learns eight languages. With his linguistic talent, he becomes an expert in deciphering ancient characters.

=== Kei Arima ===
Soichiro's sadistic cousin. He and the other nameless relatives are often seen in flashbacks torturing the defenseless Soichiro. They first appear in Volume 6, when Soichiro attends a family reunion. They mock him, and then become hostile when he tries to ignore them. They are then seen in Volume 13, pondering about whether or not Soichiro was attending a wedding. When he is smug to his aunt Eiko, they attempt to beat him up in a bathroom, but he fights back, and claims that it is his time for revenge. The nameless cousins visit Soichiro's school, and they attempt to befriend him, claiming that they hate Kei, but Soichiro punches one away. They then state that he is a disgrace, and this is their final appearance. Yukino claims later on that she will get revenge on them in perfectly legal ways.

=== Yusuke Takeshi ===
Maho's dentist boyfriend. He first meets her when he watches her lecture her friends about shoplifting, and informs her that her leg is bleeding. She then remembers him from when she explored a new street that she had never been on, mistaking him for a doorman. He claims that the vision of a pretty schoolgirl in a uniform holding flowers was an incredible sight. The two quickly become friends, and she brings him treats from her family's sweet shop. When the two are in his apartment, she confesses her feelings of love to him, disturbing him. The rest of the chapter is like a wild goose chase for the two, Maho following him around. He then tells her that she mistook friendship for love, saddening her, and time passes. She meets him again after she enrolls into high school, and he says that his headaches are coming back, and Maho vows to fix them because she wants to be a doctor. Takeshi visits the cultural festival in the manga, causing Maho to shout, knowing that he will mock her. They are also seen shopping together, and Takeshi eventually goes to New York for training. This begins the Reiji arc, because Maho visits him and they attend his concert with Kazuma and Yin and Yang. Kazuma begins to sing, and they go backstage to meet Reiji, and Takeshi exclaims that Reiji resembles somebody that they know. He is not seen again for the remaining story, his cameo in the last volume is simply Maho's profile that reads MAHO TAKESHI, proving that they got married.

=== Ryoko ===
Soichiro's abusive mother. In junior high, she was sexually and physically abused by her stepfather, emotionally scarring her for life. She is a gold digger who chases Reiji for money. After causing a misunderstanding that gets Reiji beaten badly by her gangster boyfriend and his crew, she successfully seduces a battered Reiji resulting in a single moment of intimacy. She gets pregnant Months later sends Reiji a pictures claiming he is Reiji's baby. She demands high amounts of money for child support, but Reiji soon realizes that she is abusive to the child and they lose contact. She often would beat and starve Soichiro as a child, even stabbing him at one point and leaving him for dead. Children would call him a monster due to his bruises. She eventually abandons him, and works at a bar. While watching television, she learns that Soichiro won a national kendo tournament, and tells her employees that he was taken away from her as a baby. She stalks Soichiro, hoping to cash in. He eventually refuses, and she ambushes him outside of school numerous times, making Yukino jealous. Thanks to his friends, he gets away. Going home from cram school, he encounters her, and she tries to hit him with her purse covered in jewels. Shizune appears in the nick of time and blocks him, telling her to go. Ryoko appears one last time trying to meet Soichiro and Reiji, and Reiji threatens to kill her, but she is saved by Soichiro.

=== Shizune Arima ===
Voiced by: Ai Sato (Japanese); Kristen Nelson (English)
Soji's wife. The two were childhood friends, and Soji's father was her doctor. She was quite sickly as a child, and her artist father often painted her outdoor scenes. She also had a mother and older brother. She falls in love with Soji, but she was unable to bear children, and was pleased when they adopted the adorable Soichiro. She never got along with Reiji. She is aware that the reason Reiji does not like her is because of his jealousy towards her marriage to his older brother, Soji. Her father takes interest in Asaba. She eventually saves Soichiro from Ryoko, and is angry when Soichiro cuts his hand. When she reunites with Reiji, he tells her that she has gotten old, angering her.
