= Ryōzō =

- Gender: Male

Origin
- Origin: Japanese
- Meaning: Different meanings depending on the kanji used

Ryōzō, Ryozo or Ryouzou (written: 良三 or 亮三) is a masculine Japanese given name. Notable people with the name include:

- Ryōzō Hiranuma (平沼 亮三; 1879–1959), the 5th President of the Japanese Olympic Committee
- Ryōzō Kanehira (金平 亮三; 1882–1948), Japanese botanist
- Ryozo Kato (加藤 良三; born 1941), Japanese lawyer and diplomat
- Ryōzō Nagashima (長島 良三; 1936–2013), Japanese editor, writer and translator
- Ryozo Suzuki (鈴木 良三; born 1939), former Japanese football player

== See also ==
- 21460 Ryozo, main-belt asteroid
- Ryūzō (written: 隆三, 隆造, 龍三, 龍藏 or 竜三), a similarly spelled masculine Japanese given name
- Ryuso (disambiguation)
