= Eensy Weensy Monster =

Japanese manga

- Cover of the first Japanese volume of Eensy Weensy Monster

eensy-weensy(イィンシィ-ウィンシィ) モンスター (Iinshi-Uinshi Monsutā)
- Genre: Romantic comedy
- Manga
- Written by: Masami Tsuda
- Published by: Hakusensha
- English publisher: NA: Tokyopop
- Magazine: LaLa
- Original run: October 24, 2006 – September 22, 2007
- Volumes: 2

Eensy Weensy Monster (Japanese: eensy-weensy(イィンシィ-ウィンシィ) モンスター, Hepburn: Iinshi-Uinshi Monsutā) is a shōjo manga by Masami Tsuda, published in Hakusensha's LaLa and collected into two volumes. It was licensed in English by Tokyopop, and is licensed in French by Tonkam.

== Plot ==
The story is about an average high school student, Nanoha Satsuki, who comfortably spends her time in the shadow of her two beautiful popular friends Renge Midou and Nobara Ryuzaki. Her days are happy until Hazuki Tokiwa (the "prince") with his arrogant demeanor gets under her skin, releasing her inner monster!

== Characters ==
Nanoha Satsuki

Nanoha is the heroine of our story. She is an ordinary high school student who is a little clumsy, has average grades and a plain face. She feels that her only talents lie in separating food and folding handouts. Because she is such a simple girl, she is overshadowed by her two best friends Renge and Nobara. Even though she is often forgotten, she still loves her friends dearly and is not jealous or spiteful. Nanoha is usually a very happy and easy-going girl, but one particular boy at her school gets under her skin, Hazuki Tokiwa. She calls this deep hatred for him her little monster. Because of this, she tries to avoid him at all costs, but in such a small school they are bound to run into one another at some point. At one of these encounters, Nanoha can't hold in her annoyance anymore and yells at Hazuki calling him arrogant. This one utterance changes Hazuki's world to the point where he eventually figures out that his friends, who are mainly girls, only hang out with him because he is good looking. Not wanting to be so shallow, Hazuki drops his old friends and begins to seek out Nanoha, the girl who is not afraid to be honest with him.

Renge Midou

Renge is one of Nanoha's best friends. Considered the "genius princess," Renge is beautiful and at the top of her class in every subject. She is a legend in which she doesn't study but simply memorizes everything that her teachers say. While she appears rather perfect to the rest of her classmates, she actually has a hard time making friends which makes her rather lonely. She cherishes both Nanoha and Nobara as her best friends.

Nobara Ryuzaki

Nobara is one of Nanoha's best friends. She is beautiful to the point where she is popular even with the girls in the school. Being abandoned by her father and left with a huge debt has made things rough for her family but it has also made Nobara strong. She frequently dotes on Nanoha and is seen as a sort of knight to the other girls in the school.

Hazuki Tokiwa

Hazuki is the prince of the school. Charming and beautiful he feels like he runs the school until one day when Nanoha calls him arrogant straight to his face. Finally realizing how shallow he had been acting Hazuki strives to change his ways and form friendships that are not based solely on looks.

== Reception ==
Brigid Alverson describes the manga as "short, witty, and well drawn", and praised it for its subversion of shojo manga tropes. Leroy Douresseaux enjoyed hearing both Nanoha's and Hazuki's thoughts, feeling that watching the characters "get a clue when they are so clueless is delightful".
