= Chotto Edo Made =

Japanese manga series by Masami Tsuda

- Cover of volume 1

ちょっと江戸まで
- Genre: Alternate history, romantic comedy
- Manga
- Written by: Masami Tsuda
- Published by: Hakusensha
- Magazine: LaLa
- Original run: 2008 – August 24, 2011
- Volumes: 6

Chotto Edo Made (Japanese: ちょっと江戸まで; "Just Going to Edo") is a Japanese alternate history romantic comedy shōjo manga series written and illustrated by Masami Tsuda. Published by Hakusensha, it was serialized on LaLa magazine from 2008 to August 2011 and six volumes compiling the chapters were released. The manga is set in a world where the Tokugawa shogunate never ended.

== Synopsis ==
The story revolves around Sakurai Sōbi, an abandoned child of a noble of the Sakurai family. Born during the days he indulged himself with various women, Sōbi only gets to finally return to her long lost family after the noble remembered her right before he died. She now lives under the custody of her brother and the Sakurais' new head, Sakurai Kiō. Even then, she still keeps dressing and acting like a boy as she always has rather than trying to be a proper lady. She eventually falls in love with Mito Michisato, a nobleman of the Mito family who is essentially the very opposite of her, in that he always dresses and acts like a girl, even until he is old enough to have facial hair.

== Volumes ==
- 1 (January 5, 2009)
- 2 (August 5, 2009)
- 3 (March 5, 2010)
- 4 (October 5, 2010)
- 5 (May 2, 2011)
- 6 (November 4, 2011)

== Reception ==
Volume 1 reached the 7th place on the weekly Oricon manga charts, selling 59,133 copies; volume 2 reached the 15th place with 61,001 copies; volume 3 reached the 20th place and has sold 68,130 copies; volume 4 reached the 15th place, with 61,093 copies; volume 5 reached the 9th place with 65,771 copies and volume 6 reached the 15th place and sold 74,627 copies.
