= Ryuso =

Ryuso may refer to:

- Ryusō (琉装), or ryusou, the traditional dress of the Ryukyuan people
- Ryuso Tsujino (辻野隆三) (born 1969), Japanese tennis player
