= Ryusou =

Traditional clothing of Okinawans

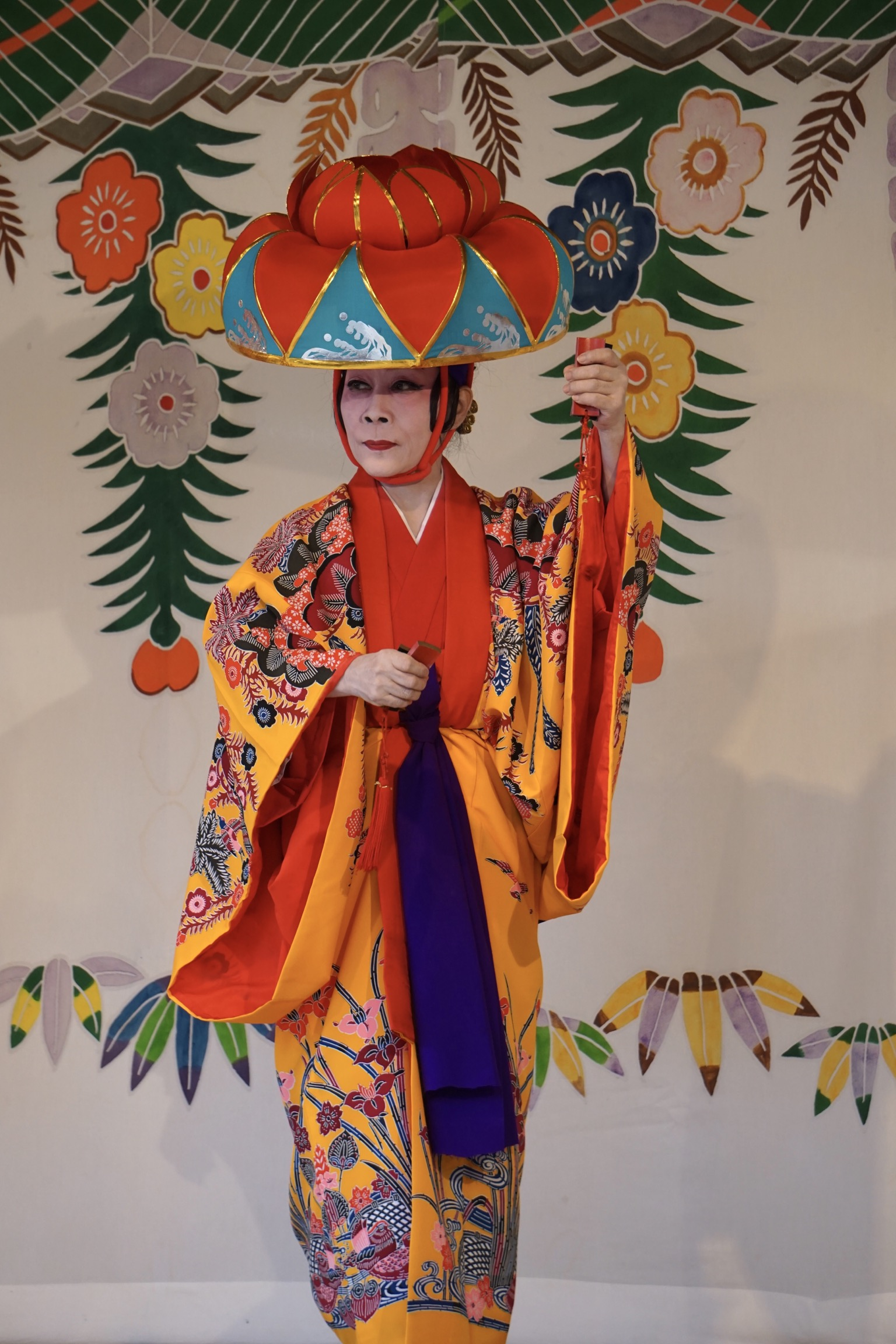
Female dancer in a bingata watansu (outer wear), red dujin (top).

Ucinaasugai (Okinawan: ウチナースガイ/沖繩姿), also known as Ryusou (Japanese: 琉装(りゅうそう), also written as ryusō) and referred as ushinchi in Okinawan, is the folk costume of Ryukyuan. Ryusou is a form of formal attire; it is customary to wear it on occasions such as wedding ceremony and the coming-of-age ceremony. The ryusou became popular during the Ryukyu Kingdom period. It was originally worn by the members of the royal family and by the nobles of Ryukyu Kingdom. The Ryukyu Kingdom was originally an independent nation which established trade relationship with many countries in Southeast Asia (Java, Malacca, and Palembang) and East Asia; they held their relationship with China as especially important. The development of the ryusou was influenced by both the hanfu and the kimono, demonstrating a combination of Chinese and Japanese influences along with local originality.

== Construction and design ==
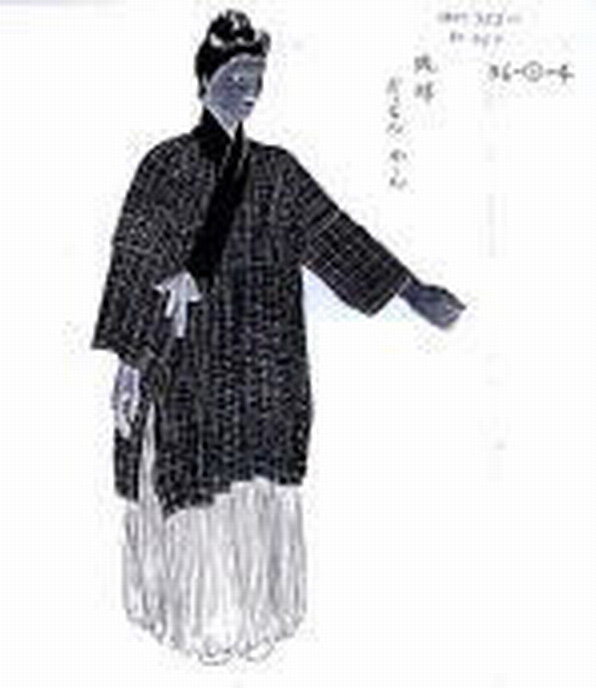
Illustration of woman wearing dujin (top) and kakan (skirt).

The ryusou shows a combination of Chinese and Japanese influences as well as local, native originality. Robes which crossed in the front was worn by both the working and upper classes; however, they differed in length (from knee to ankle length). The working class would wear a knee-length robe while the upper classes would wear robes which were ankle-length.

During the Ryukyu Kingdom period, the colour, fabric, and design of the ryusou, alongside the style of headgear, was used to distinguish the social status and rank of the wearer.

Men's ryusou differ from women's ryusou in terms of colour, design, and material. Men would secure their robes with a sash or girdle but women would hold theirs with a pin. The ryusou for women is based on the bingata (紅型, lit. 'red patterns') style of dyework. Bingata could only be afforded by the people who had a rank and were wealthy. Bingata textiles were strictly supervised by the royal court. It was closely associated with the royal court and was traditionally reserved for the royalty of Ryukyu and aristocrats, and for warrior families. Bingata is brightly coloured, commonly using red dye derived from cinnabar, the most important colour in bingata, imported from Fujian, China. It is also suggested by Japanese scholar Yoshitaro Kamakura that the dyeing and painting techniques, styles, materials, motifs (e.g. Fujian-style Chinese bird and flower were introduced under the reign of King Shō Kei) of bingata were also imported from Fujian.

A form of ryusou for women is intended to be shorter than the kimono: it is a two-piece garment attire which consists of dujin (胴衣; ドゥジン; cross-collar upper body garment) and kakan (裙; カカン; a pleated skirt). A woven or bingata garment, called watansu (綿御衣; ワタンス), can also be worn loosely over the dujin and kakan. Only men of royalty and from the warring class were allowed to wear dujin and trousers as an undergarment.

Ryusou can be made of high-quality plain-weave hemp fabric called jōfu, and bashōfu (芭蕉布), which is banana fibre textile. Bashōfu was the preferred textile for summer due to its airiness, for its smooth surface and because it does not stick to the skin in hot weather, making it suitable for the hot climate of Okinawa. According to the Zhongshan chuanxin lu (Records on Chûzan), bashōfu was worn by both men and women during winter and summer, and its value equalled that of silk. Bashōfu was also used in the making of official garments, according the Ōshima hikki (大島筆記) written in the 18th century by Japanese Confucian Tobe Yoshihiro.

=== Differences to kimono ===
Due to the differences in climate and culture, Ryukyuan clothing differed to that worn on Japan. Compared to the kimono, the ryusou has big sleeve openings, which allows for good air circulation to keep its wearer cool in tropical weather. The ryusou also uses a thin waistband instead of the wider obi worn with the kimono. The ryusou is also very light, mobile and loosely-tailored compared to the kimono. The ryusou is generally shorter than the kimono.

== History ==
=== Pre-14th century ===
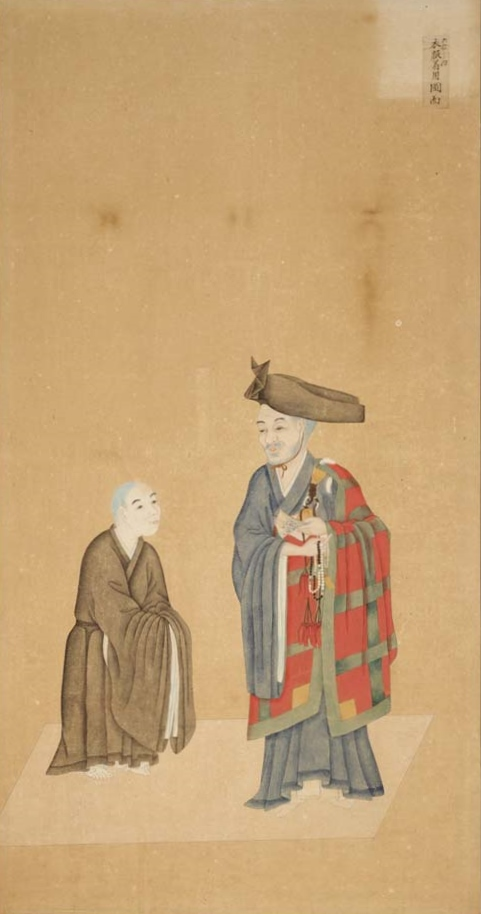
Buddhist monk dress, Ryukyu Kingdoms, 19th century.

Cotton was exported to the Ryukyuan Kingdom as early as 219 BC from China. The Ryukyuans appear to have started weaving around the time there was initial contact with China, most likely during the Han dynasty. In the Yuraiki, under the entry Ori (織, lit. 'weaving'), it states that "It is not clear when weaving began in our country. This was probably from the time that there was contact with Han [China]".

In the 5th century, oxen and swine were introduced to the islands which would also provided a source of clothing. According to a 5th-century records, the Ryukyu people only covered the upper parts of their bodies.

By the 7th to 8th centuries, people were already producing hand-woven fabric of cotton and other leaf fibers.

From the time of King Shunten's reign (1187–1237) to King Gihon (1249–1259), clothing which was characteristic of the Ryukyuan people had developed. The clothing was later recorded through illustrations; it was depicted in a 14th-century book. During the reign of King Eiso, Buddhism was introduced to the Ryukyuan Kingdom from Japan. The robes of Buddhist priests may have served as the basis in design source for the development of the people's clothing. Married women also started to be tattooed during King Satto's reign with hajichi.

=== 14th–16th century ===
==== Tributary relationship with China and Japan ====
Tributary relationships with the Ming dynasty were established in 1372 by the three kingdoms of Sanzan. In 1372, the King of Chūzan entered into a tributary relationship with the Ming dynasty, and paid tribute for 500 years for trading privileges and diplomatic ties. In exchange for their tributes, the Ming dynasty gifted the Ryukyu Kingdom with Ming dynasty clothing of various designs (including round-collar robes and cross-collared robes), silk, and royal crowns (such as the sammo, known in Chinese as the wushamao, a jewelled crown).

From the reign of Satto to the 16th century, Chinese influence on the Ryukyuan Kingdom was significant, while Japanese influence faded. According to a historical record known as Yuraiki:

In Ryukyu, [the use of] garments began during the era of Tenson. The following generations gradually gained knowledge of weaving techniques, which developed admirably. During the 16th year of the Hong-wu era [1383], King Satto started to pursue [official] relations with China. Emperor Taizu of the Hong-wu era bestowed him with a golden seal and official garments. (Until the Qing dynasty, these were Ming-style garments.)

— Hendrickx, Katrien (2007). The origins of banana-fibre cloth in the Ryukyus, Japan. Leuven [Belgium]: Leuven University Press. ISBN 978-94-6166-049-7. OCLC 715172043.

In the 15th century, textile development in Ryukyu showed Indian, Indonesian, and Chinese influences. During the reign of King Shō Shin (r. 1477–1527), a decree was made in an effort to codify and ritualize the dress code as an expression of one's social status and ranks; colours were then used to distinguish the upper and lower ranks, thus defining the elite identity in Ryukyu Kingdom. This decree by King Shō Shin was a situation where Chinese practices were localized in the Ryukyu Kingdom. Ming-style clothing for officials and daily clothing were made for the Ryukyu kings and his officials. The regal insignia was a Ryukyuan innovation, which was loosely based on the Ming dynasty regulations of dress codification. Dragon robes with 5-clawed dragon motifs (called umantun or umanshā), which resembled the dragon robes of the Ming dynasty emperor, were used by the King of Ryukyu. Yellow clothing was restricted to the ruling family of Ryukyu as in China.

King Shō Shin was also the first to established a headwear system composed of hairpins and hachimaki-style caps with varying colours according to the official ranks of its wearer. The use of hachimaki may have been a custom which had been influenced by South Asian countries. The hairpins were also strictly regulated along with clothing during this period: Kings wore gold hairpins, which were decorated with a dragon, while a phoenix head decorated the hairpins of the queens; people of noble birth wore gold hairpins, silver hairpins were worn by feudal lords, brass hairpins by merchants and farmers; pewter or plain wood hairpins were worn by the people of the poorest status. Commoners could wear hairpins with tortoise shell in alternative hexagonal shapes of black and yellow during state occasions.

The Chinese never attempted to impose their culture on the Ryukyuans. The Ryukyu people used some Chinese designs and fabrics in making; however, they also cut it in a way which would suit local tastes and whose design was practical for daily life. This allowed the Ryukyu people to be culturally independent from China. Chinese silks bestowed to the Ryukyuan people were also transformed by the local artisans in Ryukyu to make ceremonial garments; these silk ceremonial garments differed from the hemp-based clothing that most commoners would make as their clothing.

The red kakan (裙), a form of pleated underskirt, is believed to have been worn under a ceremonial attire called touishou (唐御衣装), also known as hibenfuku (皮弁服) or umanton (御蟒緞), which was gifted by the Ming dynasty emperors. The touishou was a winter ceremonial clothing worn by the Ryukyuan kings. The touishou was slightly modified from the clothing gifted by the Ming dynasty, and included unique Ryukyuan features, such as fringes at the back of the garment, while maintaining the style of Ming dynasty court clothing. In the Zhongshan chuanxin lu, it is noted that both Ryukyuan men and women wore an upper garment called jin (a type of court clothing). Male undergarments consisted of a white silk dujin (胴衣), a cross-collared upper garment closed left over right, and white silk trousers. Only members of the royal family and members of upper-class warrior families were allowed to wear these undergarments. The emperor also wore dujin and trousers as undergarments under his touishou. The combination of dujin and kakan was also worn as a ceremonial costume for women who came from warrior families. The wearing of dujin and kakan continued to be worn in Ryukyu at least until the Meiji period.

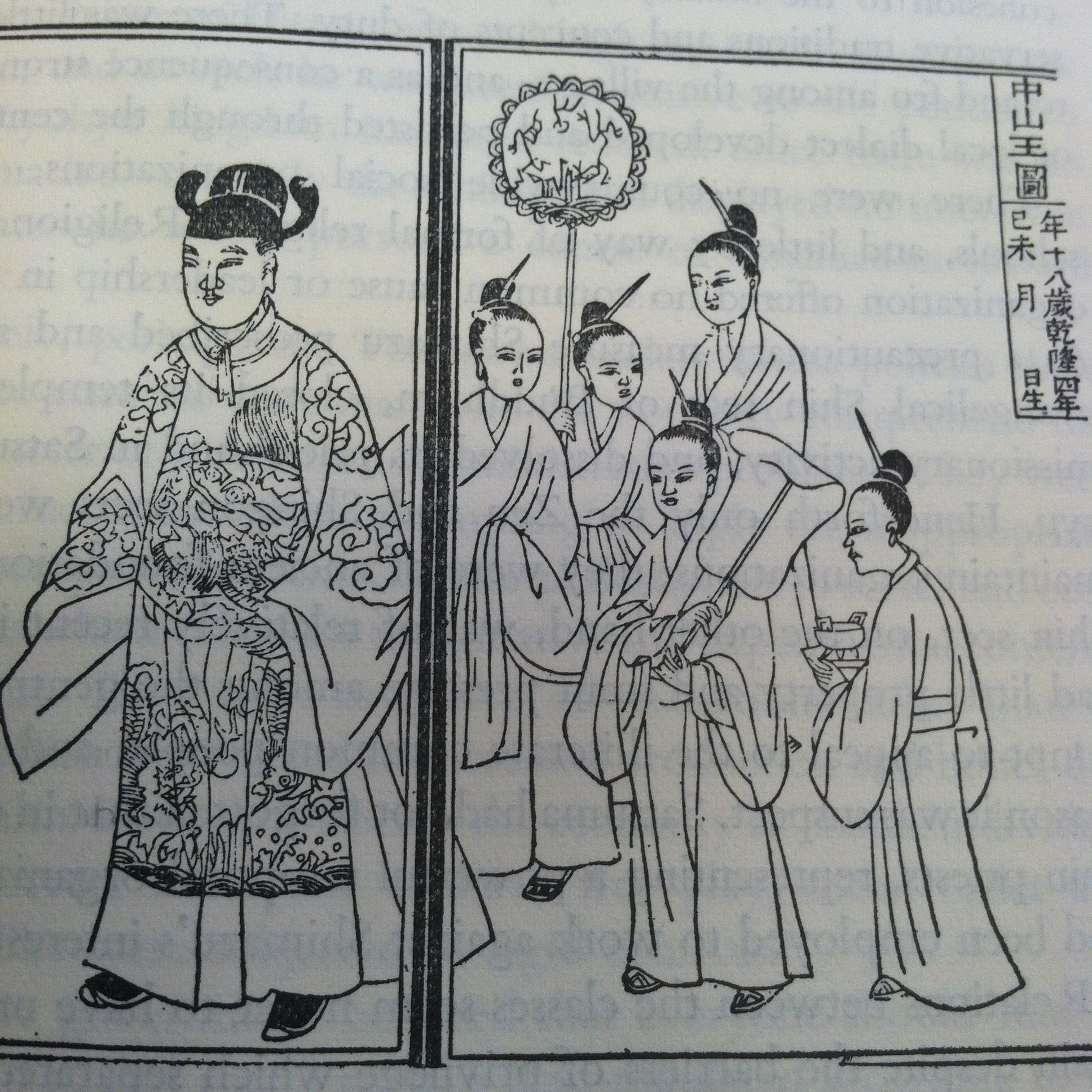
King of Chūzan and his sons

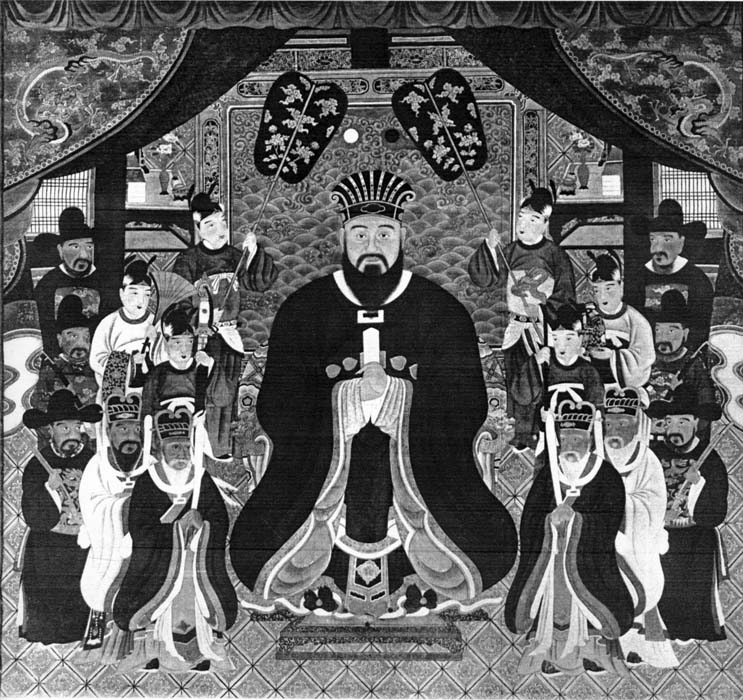
King Shō Shin

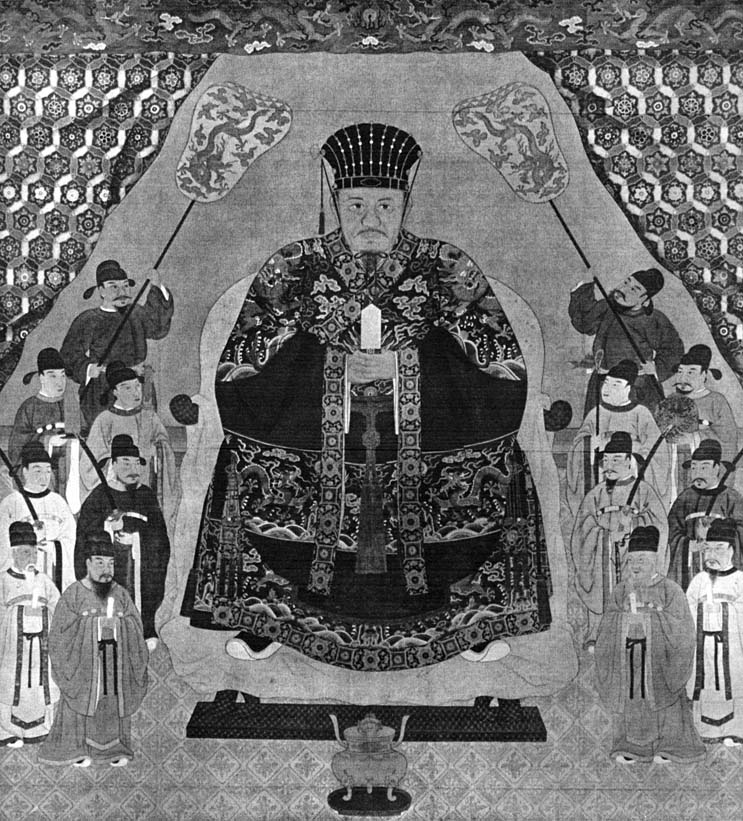
King Shō Kei, 1713–1751.

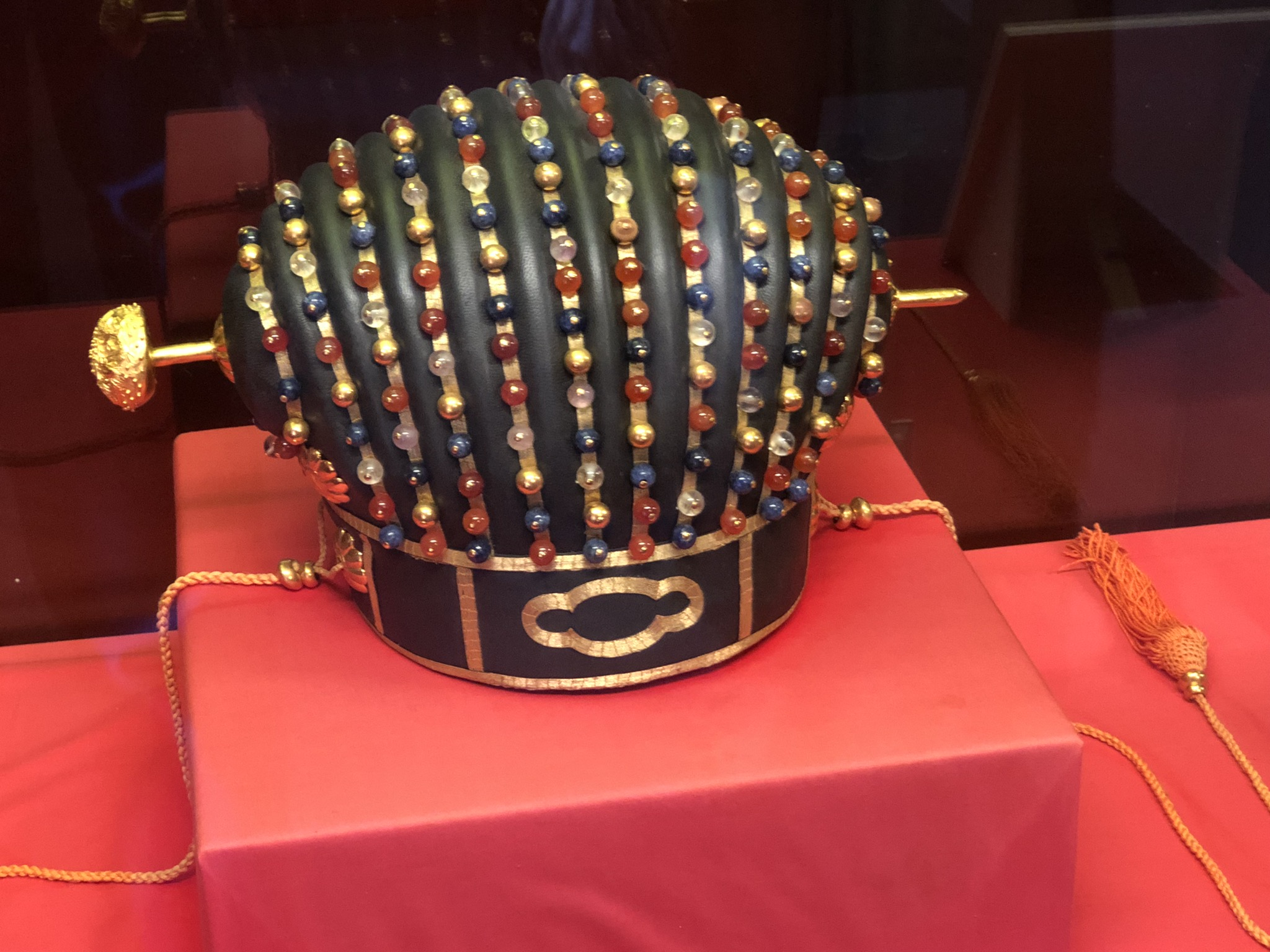
Hibekan (皮弁冠), also known as Tama-nchabui (玉御冠; 'jewelled crown'). Replica of the crown of the Kings of Ryukyu

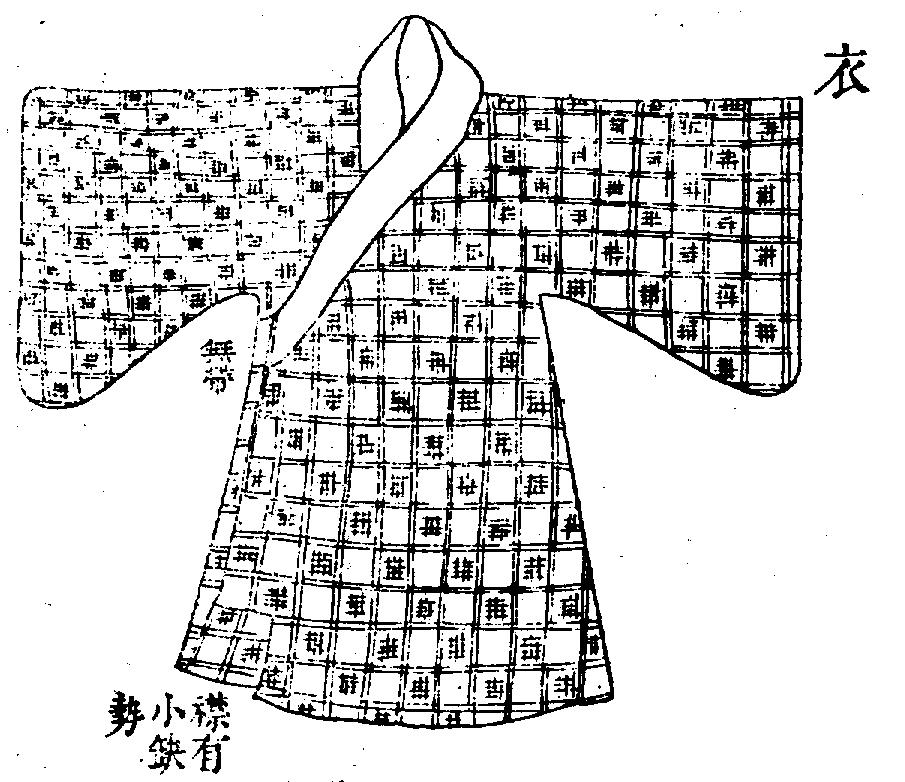
Ryukyu clothing called jin (衣) which covers the upper body. Illustration from the Zhongshan chuanxin lu, 1721.

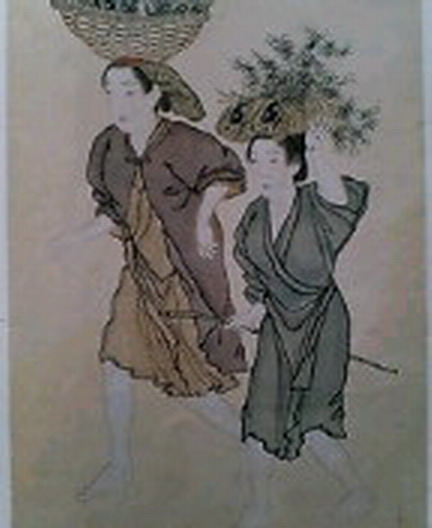
Traditional clothing of the Ryukyuan people, 1800s.

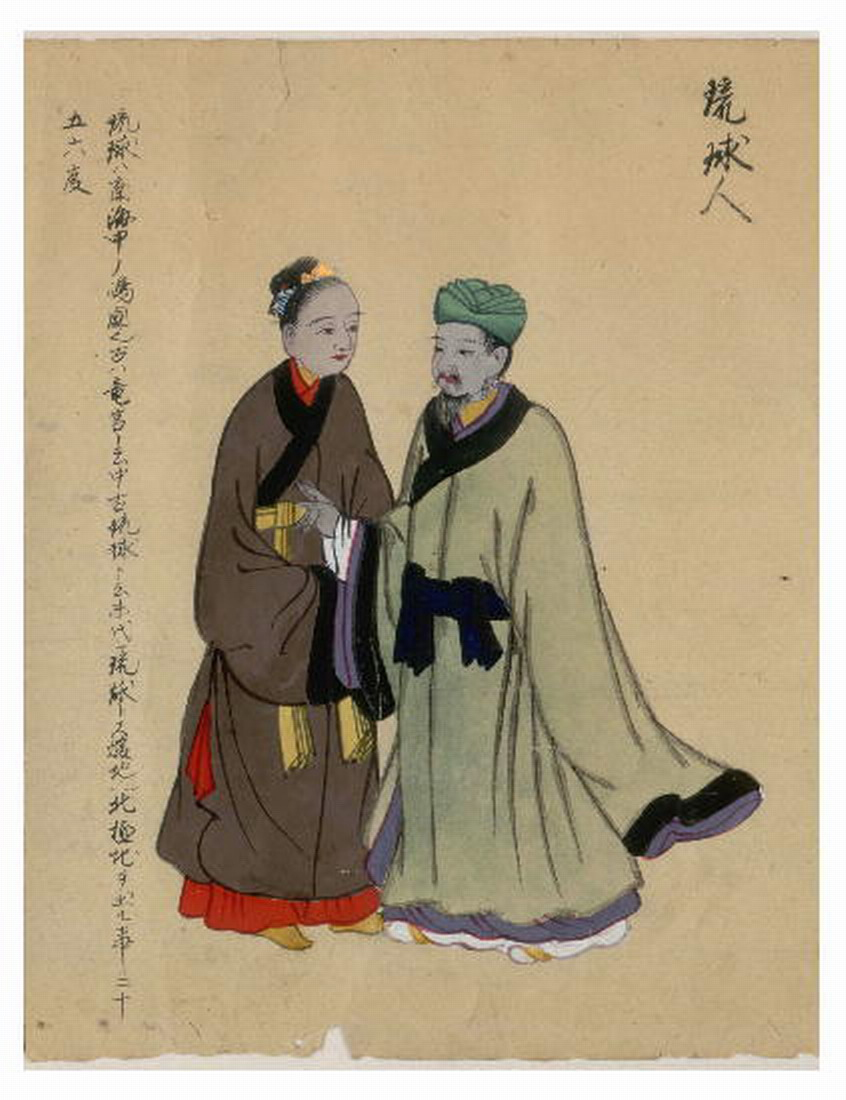
Ryukyuan people, from the Sekaijimbutsu emaki (世界人物図巻), possibly beginning of Edo period.

=== 17th century ===
After Satsuma subjugated the Ryukyu Islands in 1609, Satsuma controlled the islands and intentionally ceded to China's ritual authority over the Ryukyu Kingdom in order to win the economic profit from the tribute trade with China. The Ryukyu Kingdom continued to pay tribute to the Ming and Qing dynasties in China, but they were also forced to pay tribute to the shōgun as well. In order to hide the dual sovereignty, the Ryukyuans were forbidden from being assimilated into Japanese culture, and they were encouraged to continue wearing their traditional clothing and speak in the local language. When Ryukyuan envoys would visit Edo, they had to wear Chinese clothing. The reigns of Shō Tei to Shō Eki and Shō Kei were eras of strong Japanese influence, although the sentiment of the Ryukyu people were pro-Chinese.

Following the fall of the Ming dynasty, the Ryukyu continued to follow the Ming dynasty's court fashion and styled their own clothing with dragon emblems which were bestowed by the Qing dynasty.

From 1681, men of ranks started to wear hachimaki, which was folded 7 or 9 times at the forehead and 11 or 12 at the back. It also became a social status marker in the court hierarchy, as the colours of the hachimaki and the ways of folding it were strictly regulated by rigid rules.

=== Annexation of the Ryukyu Kingdom ===
Japanese influences increased from the year 1874, when the last King was taken prisoner in Tokyo and when Japan forbade the exchange of envoys with China. The Ryukyu Kingdom was eventually abolished and the islands were annexed without consent by the Meiji government. Between the years 1879 and 1895, many cultural and institutional characteristics of the Ryuku kingdom were preserved. However, following the arrival of Governor Shigeru Narahara, an aggressive form of cultural assimilation took place in the form of Japanization, leading to traditional Ryukyuan clothing being discouraged. The clothing of the Ryukyu people were influenced by the Japanese, and Japanese-style clothing was increasingly adopted. After the World War II, Ryukyuan bridal clothing did not show any native Ryukyuan influence, and was instead of Japanese origin.

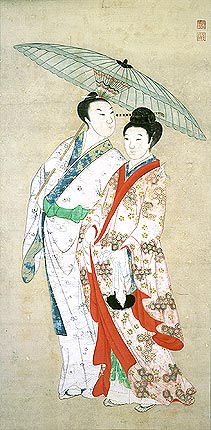
Ryukyu people, Edo period.

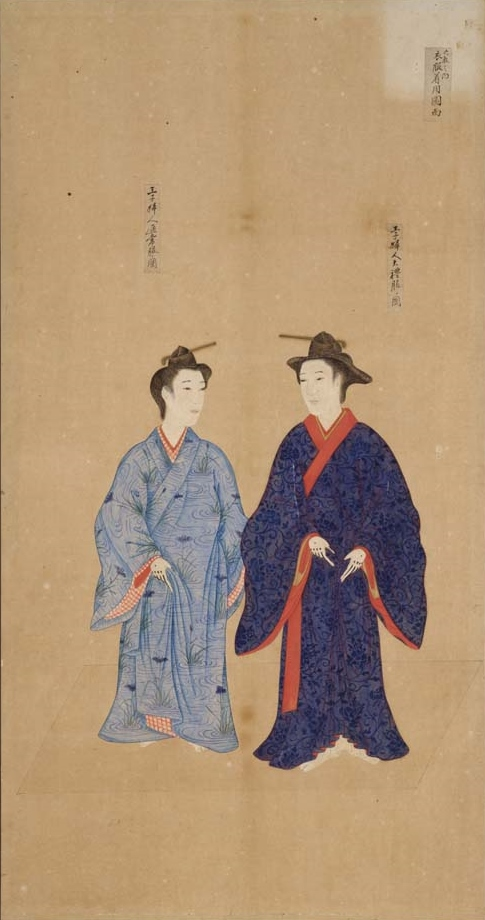
Princess dress, 19th century

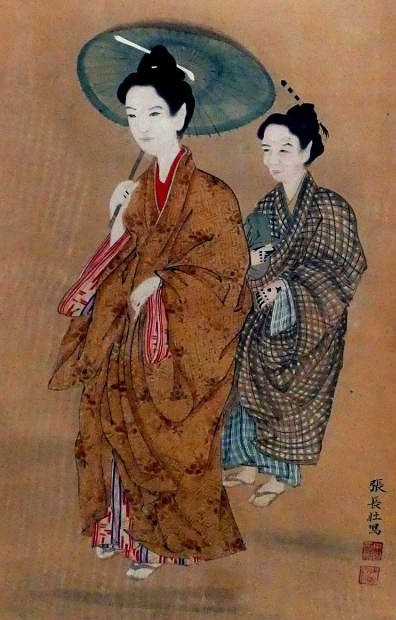
Traditional Ryukyuan clothes, 19th century.

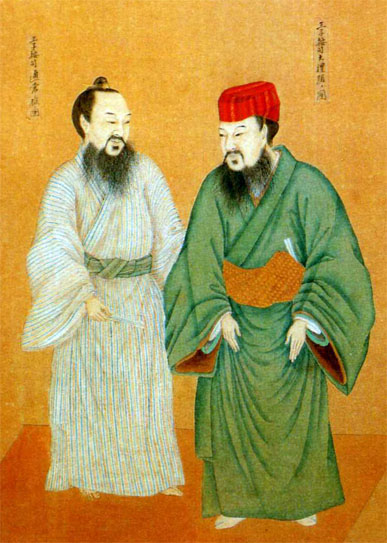
Oji (ordinary dress) and aji (court dress), 19th century.

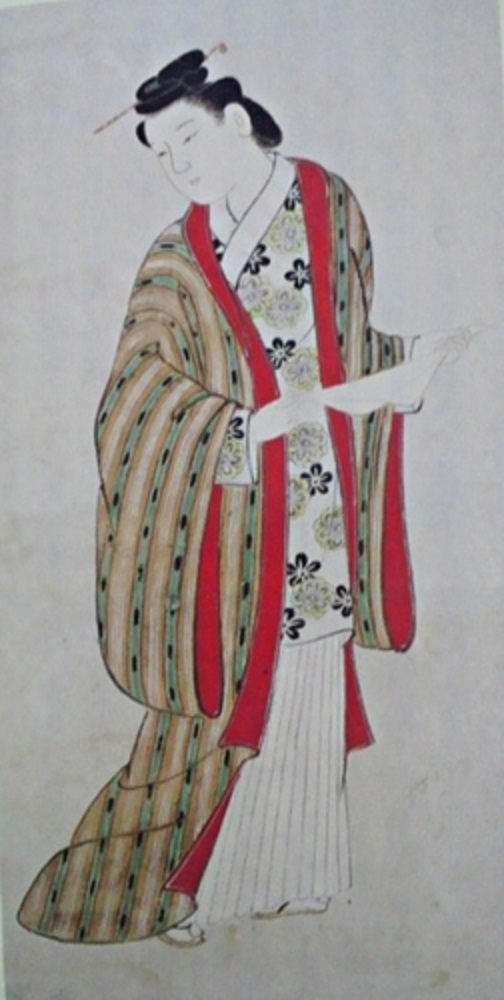
Ryukyu woman wearing watansu over dujin and kakan, 19th century.

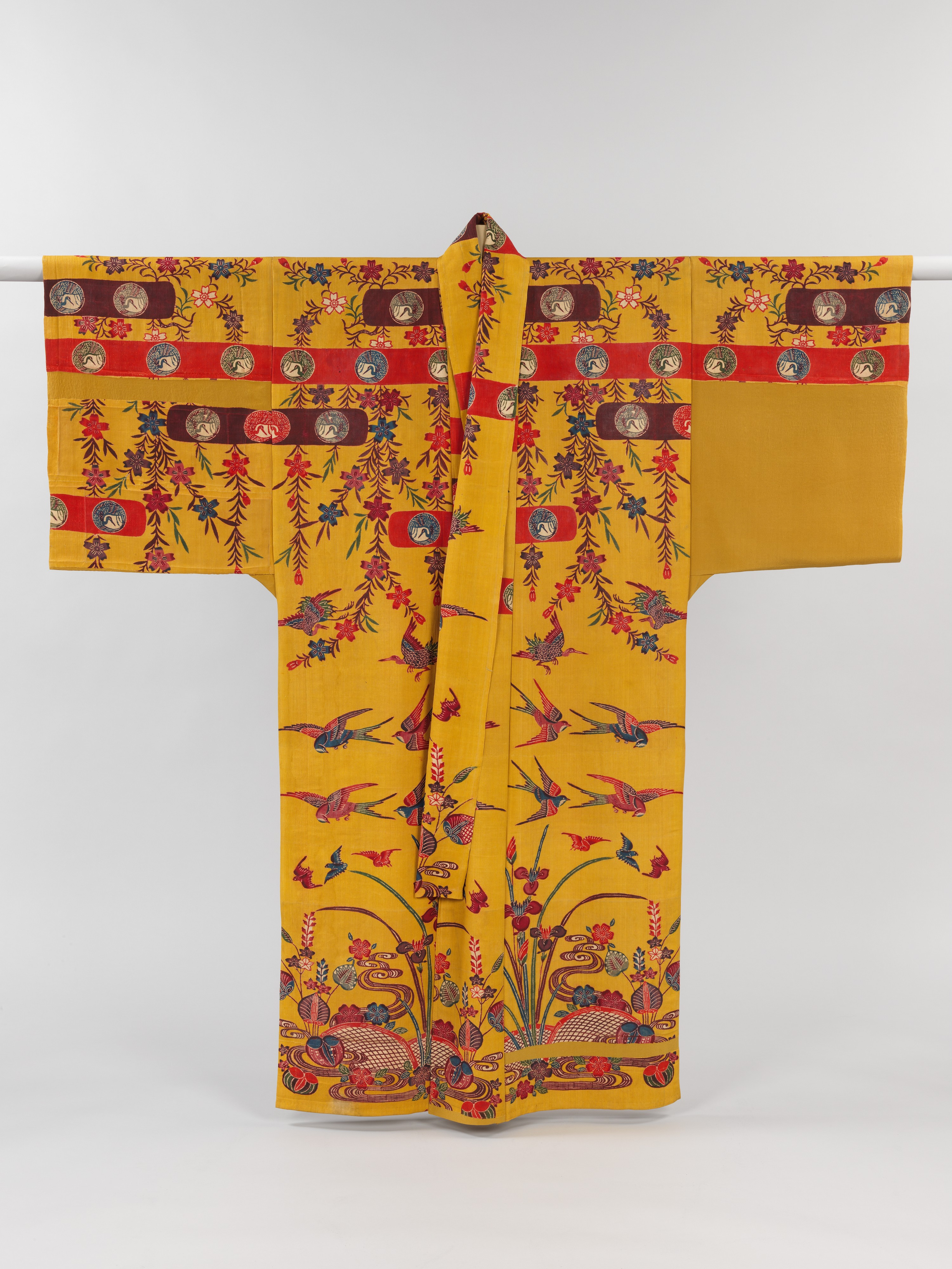
Ryukyu watansu made of bingata, 19th century

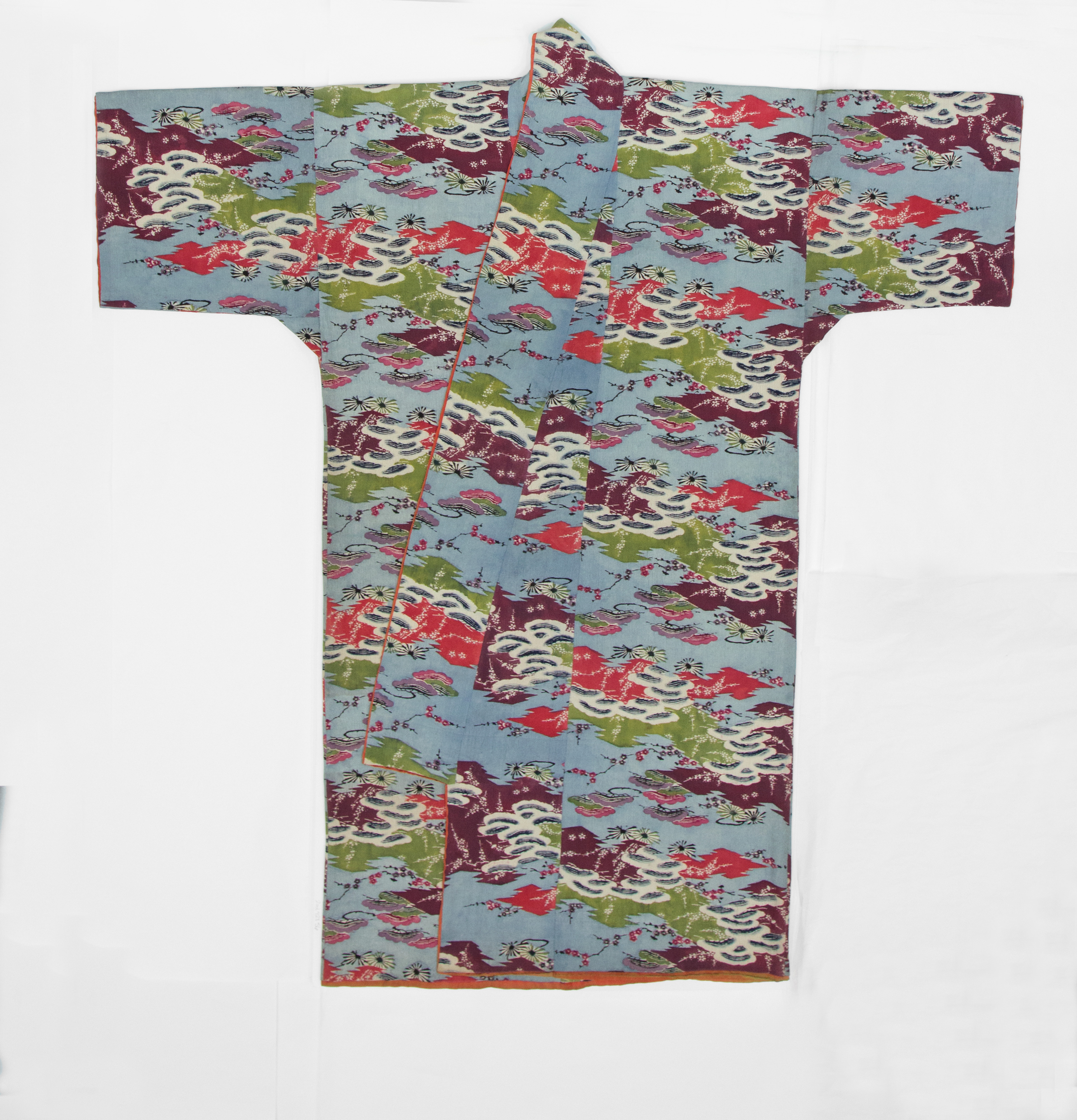
Ryukyu watansu made of bingata, 19th century

== Types of garment and headwear ==
- Dujin – a cross-collared upper garment. For women, it was worn along with the kakan. For men, it was used as ceremonial undergarment along with trousers; it was only used by the members of the royal family and the upper class warrior families. The emperor wore it under the touishou.
- Hakama – trousers.
- Hanagasa – lit. 'flower hat', it is worn women by women when performing traditional Ryukyuan dance, Yotsudake.
- Hooikakan – a pleated skirt with a long train; it was reserved for ladies of the upper class.
- Kakan – a pleated underskirt for women; it was worn with dujin. A red Kakan was also worn by the king during his enthronement under the Touishou.
- Tanashi – a summer robe worn by women of the royal family.
- Tamanchaabui/ Hibekan – Royal crown, part of formal clothing for the Ryukyu king; it was bestowed by the Chinese Emperor. It was worn on important events, such as Sappo (enthronement of the King) and on the New Year's celebration.
- Touishou – also known as hibenfuku or umanton, a type ceremonial clothing bestowed by the Chinese emperor, it was worn by the King of Ryukyu. It was worn with the Tamanchaabui/ Hibekan; Touishou was worn over the Dujin and red Kakan.
- Watajin – a lined or padded winter wear for both men and women; it was a form of formal wear in winter.
- Watansu – a lined winter robe which could be made of bingata; it was worn on top of dujin and kakan. It was worn by the royal family.

== Gallery ==
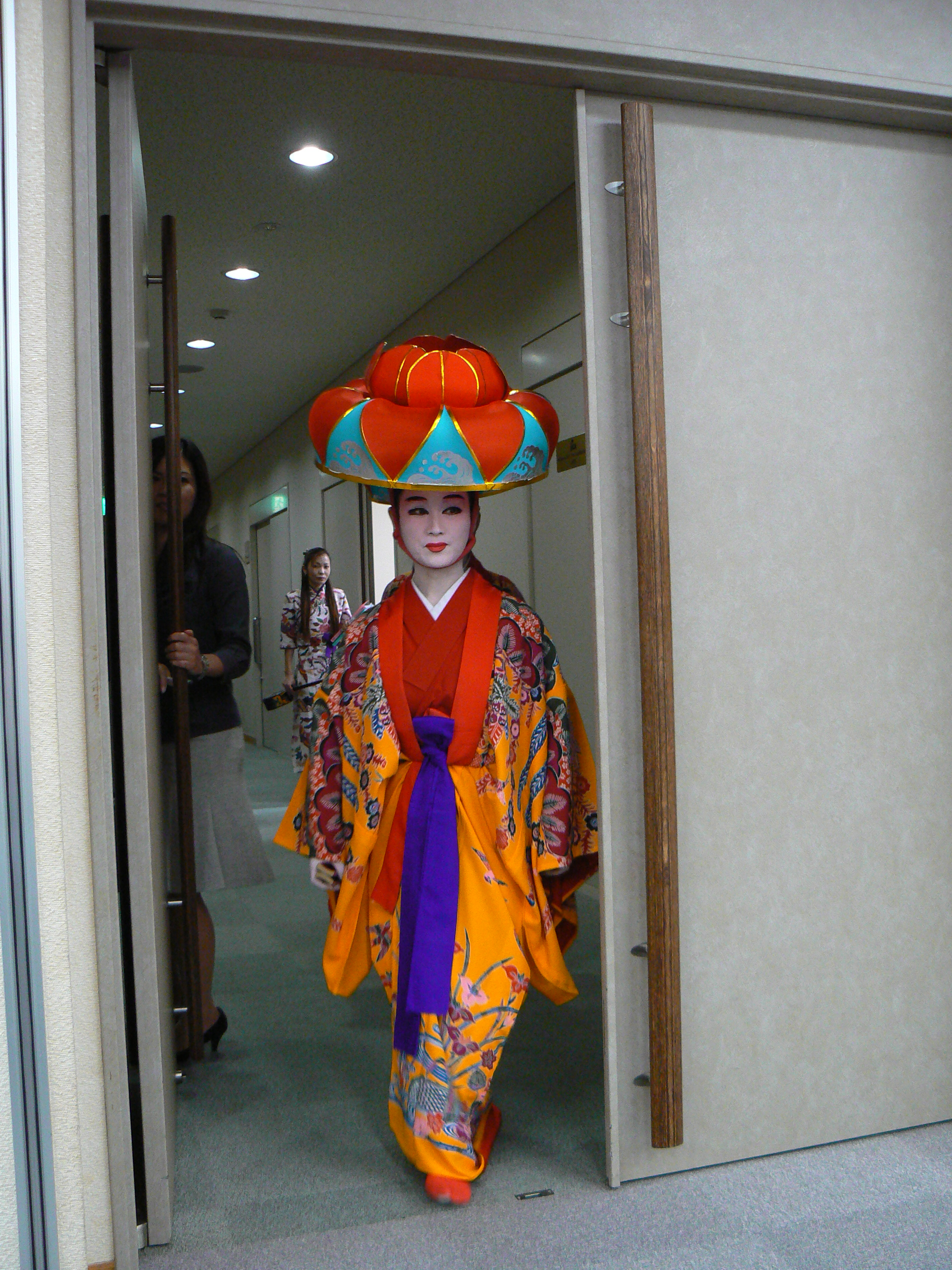

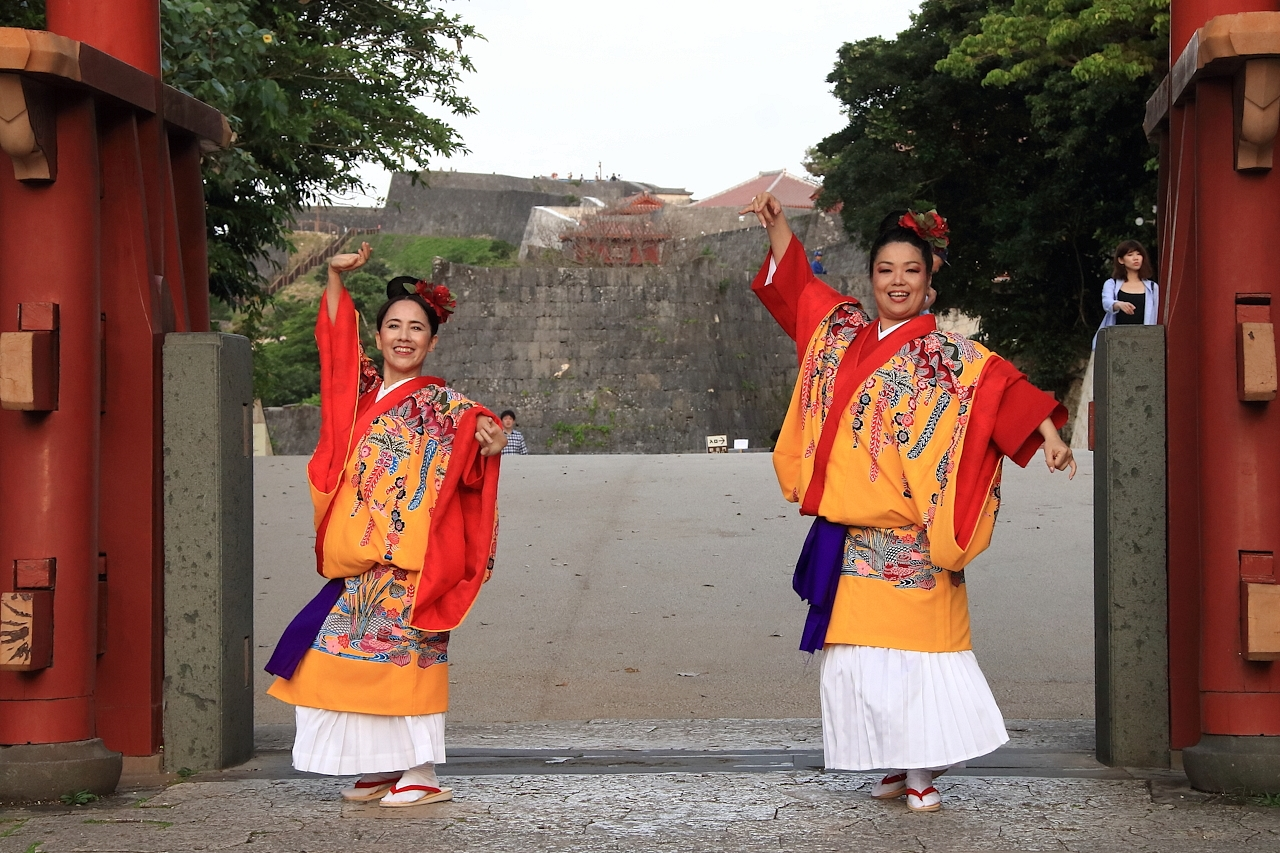

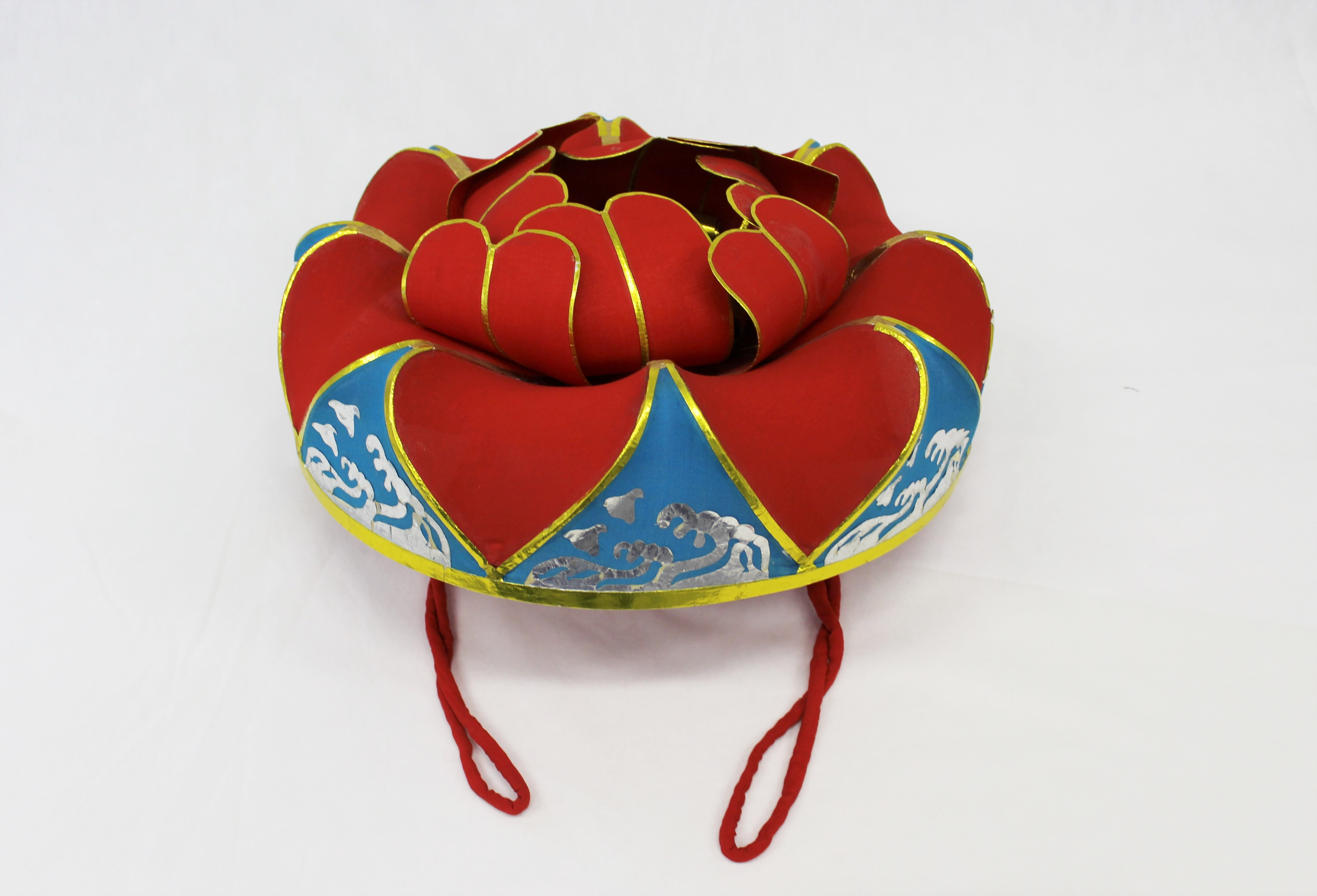
Hanagasa, a coloured hat worn by women when performing a traditional Okinawan dance called Yotsudake.

== See also ==
- Hanfu
- Kimono
- Kariyushi shirt
