= Ryōki =

- Gender: Male

Origin
- Origin: Japanese
- Meaning: Different meanings depending on the kanji used

Ryōki, Ryoki or Ryouki (written: 亮樹 or 龍起) is a masculine Japanese given name. Notable people with the name include:

- Ryoki Inoue (born 1946), Brazilian writer
- Ryōki Kamitsubo (上坪 亮樹), Japanese animator
- Ryōki Kawabuchi (川淵 龍起; 1860–1941), Japanese politician
