= Ryūzō =

- Gender: Male

Origin
- Origin: Japanese
- Meaning: Different meanings depending on the kanji used

Ryūzō, Ryuzo or Ryuuzou (written: 隆三, 隆造, 龍三, 龍藏 or 竜三) is a masculine Japanese given name. Notable people with the name include:

- Ryuzo Hiraki (平木 隆三; 1931–2009), Japanese footballer and manager
- Ryuzou Ishino (石野 竜三; born 1962), Japanese voice actor
- Ryuzo Morioka (森岡 隆三; born 1975), Japanese footballer
- Ryūzō Saki (佐木 隆三; born 1937), Japanese writer
- Ryuzo Sasaki (笹木 竜三; born 1956), Japanese politician
- Ryūzō Sejima (瀬島 龍三; 1911–2007), Japanese military leader
- Ryuzo Shimizu (清水 隆三; 1902–?), Japanese footballer
- Torii Ryūzō (鳥居 龍藏; 1870–1953), Japanese anthropologist, ethnologist and folklorist
- Ryuzo Yanagimachi (柳町 隆造; 1928–2023), Japanese scientist

== Fictional characters ==
- Ryuzo, a character in Ghost of Tsushima, played by actor Leonard Wu
