= Ryōko Morishita =

- 森下涼子
- Born: July 3, 1973 (age 52); Kashiwa, Chiba, Japan
- Occupation: Actress

Ryōko Morishita (森下涼子, Morishita Ryokō; born July 3, 1973, in Kashiwa, Chiba, Japan) is a Japanese actress.

== Career ==
She debuted as an actress under the stage name "Kei Morishita" appearing in sitcoms and commercials.

After starring in Akai Meikyū in 1993, she appeared in various dramas. She is perhaps best known for her love-hate roles in Suna no Shiro, Hi no Ryōsen, and Shinju Fujin.

== Filmography ==
Year	Title	Notes
1990	Ōedo Sōsamō	
1995	The Unfettered Shogun	
1997	Suna no Shiro	
1998	Hi no Ryōsen	
1998	The Unfettered Shogun	
2000	The Unfettered Shogun	
2002	Shinju Fujin	
2002	The Unfettered Shogun	
