= Ryōka =

- Gender: Female

Origin
- Origin: Japanese
- Meaning: Different meanings depending on the kanji used

Ryōka, Ryoka or Ryouka (written: 涼香 or 涼花) is a feminine Japanese given name. Notable people with the name include:

- Ryōka Shima (島 涼香) (born 1972), Japanese voice actress
- Ryōka Yuzuki (柚木 涼香) (born 1974), Japanese voice actress
- Ryoka Oshima (大島 涼花) (born 1998), Japanese actress and former singer
