= Masami Tsuda =

Japanese manga artist

Masami Tsuda 津田 雅美
- Born: July 9, 1970 (age 56) Kanagawa Prefecture, Japan
- Notable works: Kare Kano

Masami Tsuda (津田 雅美, Tsuda Masami; born July 9, 1970 in Kanagawa Prefecture, Japan) is a Japanese manga artist. She specialises in shōjo manga, the most famous being Kare Kano: His and Her Circumstances, which is set in Kanagawa.

Since finishing Kare Kano, she worked on the series Chotto Edo Made, which appeared in LaLa from May 2008 through August 2011. She then started work on Hinoko, premiering in LaLa in March 2012.

== Manga works ==
- Meet Me Again Tomorrow in the Forest (あした また森であおうね, Ashita Mata Mori de Aoune) (1993)
- Busu to Himegimi (ブスと姫君; "Ugly Girl and Princess") (1994)
- The Tiger and the Chameleon - A Promise for One Week (トラ と カメレオン, Tora to Kamerion) (1994)
- The Room Where An Angel Lives (天使の棲む部屋, Tenshi no Sumu Heya) (1995)
- The Day I Became a Woman (オンナになった日, Onna ni Natta Hi) (1996)
- Kare Kano: His and Her Circumstances (彼氏彼女の事情, Kareshi Kanojo no Jijō) (1996–2005)
- Castle of Dreams (夢の城 -魔法使いシリーズ-, Yume no Shiro) (1999)
- Akai Mi (赤い実) (2005)
- Eensy Weensy Monster (eensy-weensy モンスター) (2007)
- Chotto Edo Made (ちょっと江戸まで) (2008–2011)
- Hinoko (ヒノコ) (2012–2017)
