= Kare Kano =

Japanese manga series

- Manga volume 1 cover, featuring Yukino Miyazawa

彼氏彼女の事情 (Kareshi Kanojo no Jijō)
- Genre: Romantic comedy
- Manga
- Written by: Masami Tsuda
- Published by: Hakusensha
- English publisher: NA: Tokyopop
- Magazine: LaLa
- Original run: December 22, 1995 – May 10, 2005
- Volumes: 21
- Anime television series

His and Her Circumstances
- Directed by: Hideaki Anno; Hiroki Sato (Note: Episodes #16–26)
- Produced by: Noriko Kobayashi; Takayuki Yanagisawa; Toshimichi Ōtsuki
- Written by: Hideaki Anno (Note: Series composition and screenwriter of episodes #1–18, #20–22 and #24. Other screenwriters: Hiroyuki Imaishi (#19), Shōji Saeki (#23), Tatsuo Satō (#25) and Ken Andō (#26).)
- Music by: Shirō Sagisu
- Studio: Gainax; J.C.Staff
- Licensed by: Crunchyroll (Note: In North America through Right Stuf under its Nozomi Entertainment label and in Australia through Crunchyroll Store Australia (formerly known as Madman Anime).); SA/SEA: Muse Communication
- Original network: TXN (TV Tokyo)
- English network: US: Anime Selects, Funimation Channel, Starz
- Original run: October 2, 1998 – March 23, 1999
- Episodes: 26
- icon

Kare Kano (Japanese: 彼氏彼女の事情, Hepburn: Kareshi Kanojo no Jijō; lit. 'His and Her Circumstances') is a Japanese manga series written and illustrated by Masami Tsuda. It was serialized in LaLa from 1995 to 2005 and collected in 21 tankōbon volumes by Hakusensha. It depicts the romance between "perfect" student Yukino Miyazawa and her academic rival Soichiro Arima, and the relationships of several of their friends.

The series is licensed and was published in English in North America by Tokyopop. The chapters from the first seven volumes were adapted into a 26-episode anime television series by Gainax and J.C.Staff. Directed by Hideaki Anno, the episodes were broadcast in Japan on TV Tokyo from October 1998 to March 1999. It is licensed for distribution outside of Japan by Muse Communication and Enoki Films under the title Tales at North Hills High, and sub-licensed for distribution in North America by Nozomi Entertainment, which released it as His and Her Circumstances.

== Plot ==
Yukino Miyazawa is a Japanese high school first-year student who is the envy of classmates for her good grades and immaculate appearance. However, her "perfect" exterior is a façade, an egocentric charade she maintains to win praise. In the privacy of her own home, she is spoiled, stubborn, a slob, and studies relentlessly and obsessively to maintain her grades. On entering high school, she is knocked from her position at the top of the class by Soichiro Arima, a handsome young man whose very existence Yukino considers a threat to the praise on which she thrives, and she vows to destroy him. When Soichiro confesses that he has a crush on her, Yukino rejects him then boasts about it at home. Her observant little sister Kano points out that her rivalry with him comes from admiration, causing her to rethink her own feelings.

Before she can figure out if she hates or likes Soichiro, he visits her home and discovers her being herself. He uses the information to blackmail her into doing his student council work. At first Yukino accepts it, coming to realize that he is also not the perfect student he pretends to be. Tired of being used, Yukino revolts and Soichiro apologizes, and admits he still loves her and just wanted to spend time with her. Yukino realizes she loves him as well, and together they resolve to abandon their fake ways and be true to themselves, though she initially has trouble breaking her lifelong habit of pretend-perfection and her competitive ways. She battles with this newfound love and the feelings of being two-faced.

As the anime progresses, Yukino is able to open her true self to others and earns her first real friends beyond Soichiro. It is eventually revealed that Soichiro was striving to be perfect to avoid turning "bad" like the parents who abandoned him. Falling in love with Yukino, he is able to become more true to himself, but he also finds himself becoming increasingly jealous of Yukino's change bringing new friends and new activities into her life, and of her having parts of her life that do not involve him. When Yukino unknowingly hurts him, he becomes even more jealous and afraid, and begins to wear another façade of the "perfect boyfriend" in an effort to protect her from his "ugly" self.

The return of both of his parents into his life sends Soichiro into a dark area, but helps him finally break free to truly be himself as Yukino and their friends help him learn to lean on and trust others. The end of the series shows Yukino and Soichiro in their 30s, with their three children, and gives updates on the various friends they made along the way.

== Production ==
Kare Kano was Masami Tsuda's first lengthy manga series. Still new to professional manga writing in general, shortly after starting the series she had to put it on hold while she finished working out the framework of the story and where she ultimately wanted it to go.

In adapting the first seven volumes into an anime television series, director Hideaki Anno kept the same general scenes and dialogue but modified the overall feel and focus of the series, making it into a "personal case study of relationships". He emphasizes the dialog over the animation using a variety of techniques, including iconic scenes, production sketches, real-life location shots, repeated imagery, and even using animation versions of manga panels or simply printing the lines of the dialog being spoken over static screens.

Anno is credited as director for the first 16 episodes and co-director with Hiroki Sato for later episodes but with his name written in katakana as アンノヒデアキ (anno hideaki) possibly as a form of protest. Kare Kano would be the last anime series that Anno would direct for Gainax. According to Michael S. Johnson of Nausicaa.net, Anno objected to the restrictions placed on television anime by TV Tokyo after the Pokémon seizure incident. However, in Anno's own interview from the Kare Kano Blu-ray release, he talks about creating one of the first eyecatches that told audiences to watch in a brightly lit room away from the TV, a fact he seemed proud of as many started to copy him.

In an interview, Hiroyuki Yamaga said Gainax found it difficult to work with a series that is based on an original work, stating: "Kare Kano was supposed to be romantic comedy and we wanted to emphasize the comedy and not the romance. The author wanted to emphasize them both and that is where the conflict came to be. We would like to continue to work on it but we have upset the author, so it is very unlikely that there will be a continuation of the series. I am very sorry."

Tsuda disputed these statements in her own interview on the French Gainax site: "For the rest, I trusted them and did not worry about it. When I entrusted the adaptation to other people, I knew that it would not be "my" Kare Kano, even if the adaptation was the purest and the most faithful. So I gave them carte blanche, being careful not to make any comments. And in the end, a lot of people could see my story, ... I am very happy about that."

== Media ==
=== Manga ===
Written by Masami Tsuda, Kare Kano was first serialized in LaLa between December 22, 1995, and May 10, 2005. The 101 individual chapters, referred to as "Acts", were compiled into 21 tankōbon volumes by Hakusensha. The first volume was released on June 5, 1996, with the final volume released on August 5, 2005. It also had a one-shot published on June 23, 2011.

Kare Kano was initially licensed for an English language release by Mixx Entertainment in 2000, but it subsequently lost those rights before publication began. In July 2001, the company's Tokyopop division announced that it had reacquired the license and that it would be serializing the title in their Smile magazine starting in 2002. However, Smile was discontinued in 2002 before the Tokyopop released the first collected volume of the series on January 21, 2003; the final volume was released on January 10, 2007. It was one of the first manga series that Tokyopop released in the original Japanese orientation, in which the book is read from right to left, and with the original sound effects left in place. In February 2008, Tokyopop reissued the first three volumes in a single omnibus volume.

The series is licensed for regional language releases by Editions Tonkam in France by Grupo Editorial Vid in Mexico, by Glènat España in Spain, by Dynamic Italia in Italy, by Carlsen Comics in Germany, by Panini Comics in Brazil, and by Planet Manga in Portugal. The chapters were also serialized in the French magazine Magnolia and the German magazine Daisuki.

=== Anime ===
Kare Kano was adapted as an anime television series produced by Gainax and J.C.Staff. The series was directed by Hideaki Anno. The 26 episodes were broadcast on TV Tokyo from October 1998 to March 1999. The opening theme was "Tenshi no Yubikiri" by Fukuda Mai, and the ending themes were "Yume no Naka e" by Atsuko Enomoto & Chihiro Suzuki for episodes 1–24 and 26 and "Kaze Hiita Yoru" by Yuki Watanabe & Maria Yamamoto for episode 25.

| No. | Title | Directed by | Written by | Original release date |
|---|---|---|---|---|
| 1 | "Her Circumstances"; Transliteration: "Kanojo no jijō" (Japanese: 彼女の事情) | Ken Andō | Hideaki Anno | October 2, 1998 |
Yukino Miyazawa is the most popular girl in school, but in real life she is a spoiled, lazy, stubborn, and unmanageable. She acts so perfect only to be admired, treated special, and pampered. Her only rival is Soichiro Arima, who is even more perfect than her. After a week of obsessing over this, she beats him in a test, but feels bad because she is a hypocrite. The next morning he confesses to her, but she refuses and regrets. That Sunday, Arima comes over to loan her a CD, and she accidentally shows him her true self. Eyecatch: Disasters will come when you let your guard down (油断大敵, Yudantaiteki)
| 2 | "Their Secret"; Transliteration: "Futari no himitsu" (Japanese: 二人の秘密) | Masahiko Ōtsuka | Hideaki Anno | October 9, 1998 |
At school Arima does not tell anyone about it, but starts to tease her about her true nature that he stumbled upon. He uses her secret as a weapon to make her do all of his work. He is also not who he looks like. One night he treats her to dinner. The next day Yukino falls asleep in the classroom and is found by Arima when he returns from kendo practice. Yukino struggles to understand why Arima is on her mind. She then realizes that she is in love with Arima. Everyone has started to notice the changes in her. Yukino has decided she will no longer be doing Arima's work and feels that Arima was just using her. Yukino tells Arima she is finished with him and runs out of the classroom, he chases after her. Arima explains that he just wanted to get to know her and he had no intention of ever telling her secret. The two then become friends. Arima starts to wonder why Yukino is always on his mind. Eyecatch: Good luck and bad luck go hand in hand (塞翁失馬, Saiōshitsuba)
| 3 | "His Circumstances"; Transliteration: "Kareshi no jijō" (Japanese: 彼氏の事情) | Ken Andō | Hideaki Anno | October 16, 1998 |
After Arima notices the differences between Yukino and his family he feels insecure and starts to avoid Yukino. Meanwhile, Yukino agonizes over why Arima does not want to be around her. Yukino realizes Arima is the only real friend she has ever had. She eventually confronts Arima about avoiding her. At first he is hesitant but in the end tells her. He is an adopted child, his real parents were blackmailers and thieves and they would abuse Arima. One day, they ran away because of a huge debt they had and left Arima alone. He was adopted by his father's older brother and they took good care of him. He felt that he could not open up to them properly because he was always trying hard to keep up a fake face to make sure no one judged him because of his parents. In the end, Yukino and Arima decide to let loose a little and slowly break away from the perfect images they had set up. Arima confesses to Yukino once again. Eyecatch: Emotions are a difficult thing to read (厚貌深情, Kōbōshinjō)
| 4 | "Her Difficult Problem"; Transliteration: "Kanojo no nandai" (Japanese: 彼女の難題) | Ikurō Satō | Hideaki Anno | October 23, 1998 |
Yukino tries to think of multiple strategies of confessing to Arima, but things do not work out as the way she planned. She later realizes though that it is her stubbornness that is causing the strategies to fail. She then tries to make Arima nervous so she can confess to him. She realizes she is scared to tell Arima how she feels because of her fear of getting hurt by him. In the end, Yukino finally gets the courage to confess. But instead of saying it to Arima, she ends up holding his hand in a meeting. By the end of the day, they are boyfriend and girlfriend. Eyecatch: Falling into your own trap (自縄自縛, Jijōjibaku)
| 5 / 5 1/2 | "Days of Labyrinth / His Ambition"; Transliteration: "Hibi no meikyū / Kare no yabō" (Japanese: 日々の迷宮 / 彼の野望) | Ken'ichi Kasai | Hideaki Anno | October 30, 1998 |
The school's Sports Fest has been taking up all of Yukino and Arima's time, making it so that they do not see each other at all for two days. Finally they pass each other while running to do some tasks for the festival. Being stressed out, Arima yells at some guys that were asking them for help. Then, Arima and Yukino go to the roof. It is awkward at first, but they then talk. After a comment that Yukino says, Arima makes a distracting comment of the weather and ends up kissing Yukino on the cheek. He then leaves to go back to work again. After a while, Yukino notices Asaba Hideaki. Since he is friends with Arima, Yukino tries to befriend him, but all Asaba does is be rude to her and walk away. This leads to a lot of fighting between the two of them. Arima also later asks Yukino on a date. While Yukino is walking in the hallways, she bumps into Asaba who tells her that he wants to use Arima as his partner to get girls and ends up making her feel bad. Arima, who knows what Asaba had done, later gets Asaba by the shirt and tells him that he is wrong. While Yukino is getting stood up by Arima, she bumps into Asaba who apologizes to her. He then tells her that he might even like her. Arima then comes sprinting to Yukino and explains to her that it was his mother. Asaba then grabs Arima and tells him to apologize but Yukino stops him. Asaba ends up joining their group. Eyecatch (5): Thorns and then more thorns (千荊万棘, Senkeibankyoku) Eyecatch (5.5): To be vigilantly hostile (虎視眈々, Koshitantan)
| 6 | "Your Voice That Changes Me"; Transliteration: "Boku o kaeru, kimi no koe" (Japanese: 僕を変える、君の声) | Masahiko Ōtsuka | Hideaki Anno | November 6, 1998 |
Arima and Yukino go on dates like crazy and Yukino cannot stop but staring at Arima. Arima then realizes he has not changed a bit as he has dated Yukino. One day Arima and Yukino are alone at school and Arima realizes that Yukino smiles like herself only when she is with him and they share their first kiss. Eyecatch: Opposites attract (芝蘭結契, Shirankekkei)
| 7 | "Their Estrangement"; Transliteration: "Futari no sokaku" (Japanese: 二人の阻隔) | Hidekazu Satō | Hideaki Anno | November 13, 1998 |
Arima's and Miyazawa's grades have dropped. The two of them have been spending time having fun rather than studying. The teachers call Arima and Miyazawa to the office and tell them they need to break up. Miyazawa stands up to the teachers and tells them that they will study, but love is more important than their grades. The teachers call Arima and Miyazawa's parents. In the end, the parents tell the teachers that they have no reason to tell Arima and Miyazawa to break up and trust their decision as they have always been responsible. Eyecatch: Never to yield (不撓不屈, Futōfukutsu)
| 8 / 1/2 | "Her Day / In a Grove of Blossoming Cherry Trees"; Transliteration: "Kanojo no nichijō / Sakura no hayashi no mankai no shita" (Japanese: 彼女の日常 / 桜の林の満開の下) | Shōji Saeki (8); Ken Andō (1/2) | Hideaki Anno | November 20, 1998 |
Arima invites Miyazawa over to his house on make-up exam day. They spend the day together and share their second kiss. Arima recalls how his life was before he met Miyazawa and how it changed after that. Eyecatch (8): Serene and composed (安閑恬静, Ankantensei) Eyecatch (0.5): More beautiful than peach blossoms (人面桃花, Jinmentōka)
| 9 | "Atonement for Postponed Debts"; Transliteration: "Moratoriamu no shokuzai" (Japanese: モラトリアムの贖罪) | Ken'ichi Kasai | Hideaki Anno | November 27, 1998 |
The girls in class 1A realize that maybe Miyazawa is not really a model student after all. They start to ignore her. Miyazawa and Shibahime Tsubasa meet each other. She is jealous that Miyazawa has Arima's heart. Tsubasa is mean to Miyazawa but she is quickly caught by Arima who makes her apologize. Arima explains that he only sees Tsubasa as a little sister. She did not mind until she found out he was with Miyazawa. This only further angers Tsubasa. Her friends come to talk to Miyazawa. The girls in the class wonder how much longer they have to ignore Miyazawa. Eyecatch: What goes around comes around (因果応報, Ingaōhō)
| 10 | "Everything Starts Now"; Transliteration: "Subete wa korekara" (Japanese: すべてはこれから) | Hideki Okamoto | Hideaki Anno | December 4, 1998 |
The girls are continuing to ignore Miyazawa. Arima wants to fix it, but Miyazawa refuses to let him help. She is still also feeling the wrath of Tsubasa. Tsubasa's friends have decided to make Yukino their friend. Miyazawa finally confronts Isawa Maho. The other girls in the class start to realize that they were being used by Maho who is incredibly jealous of Yukino. Tsubasa and Miyazawa have a confrontation after Tsubasa rips up a picture in Arima's wallet. They begin to have an understanding of each other. Everything starts to turn around for Miyazawa. People are accepting Miyazawa for who she actually is. Eyecatch: Sudden change of situation (急転直下, Kyūtenchokka)
| 11 / 11 1/2 | "At the End of the First Semester / At the Beginning of Summer Break"; Transliteration: "1-gakki no owari ni / Natsu no yasumi no hajimari ni" (Japanese: 1学期の終わりに / 夏の休みのはじまりに) | Ken Andō | Hideaki Anno | December 11, 1998 |
The end of the semester is finally here. Everyone is figuring out their summer plans. Arima will not be able to spend the summer with Miyazawa because he will be in a kendo tournament. It is the first time they have spent any time apart. Summer starts and Miyazawa is spending time with her new friends. Eyecatch (11): Tender, protective feelings for women (憐香惜玉, Renkōsekigyoku) Eyecatch (11.5): Birds of a feather flock together (同気相求, Dōkisōkyū)
| 12 | "The Location of Happiness"; Transliteration: "Shiawase no Arika" (Japanese: 仕合わせの在りか) | Kazuya Tsurumaki | Hideaki Anno | December 18, 1998 |
Tsubasa insists on staying the night at Yukino's house, saying that with his engagement, her father no longer wants her, just like Arima. Yukino's family allows her to stay the night. Except for Tsubasa, they all play a round of UNO. That evening, Tsubasa's father and his fiancee arrive and explain the situation from his point of view. Yukino's mom tells Tsubasa's father that Tsubasa should stay the night at their house. Eyecatch: Neither happiness nor sadness is ever permanent (悲歓離合, Hikanrigō)
| 13 | "The Subjectivity of Happiness"; Transliteration: "Shiawase no shukan" (Japanese: 幸せの主観) | Masahiko Ōtsuka | Hideaki Anno | December 25, 1998 |
As she lies awake that night while spending the night at Yukino's, Tsubasa realizes she is being selfish, wanting her father all to herself and in the morning, she accepts the engagement. At a formal dinner, she meets her attractive future step brother, Kazuma, who is the same age as she is, but when he mistakes her for an elementary school student, she loses her temper. A few days later, they meet by accident and spend the afternoon together before going to Kazuma and his mother's apartment. At the end of the evening, she tells her father that she approves of the marriage, and they get married the next day. Eyecatch: Home from the front, back to the fields (帰馬放牛, Kibahōgyū)
| 14 / 14 1/2 | "The Story So Far (First Part / Middle Part)"; Transliteration: "Koremade no ohanashi (Zenpen / Chūhen)" (Japanese: これまでのお話 (前編 / 中編)) | Masahiko Ōtsuka | Hideaki Anno | December 30, 1998 |
A recap episode, summarizing the events of episodes 1 through 8. Eyecatch (14): Turns and twists (紆余曲折, Uyokyokusetsu) Eyecatch (14 1/2): Fleeting shifts and changes of life (有為転変, Uitenpen)
| 15 / 15 1/2 | "The Story So Far (Final Part) / What Can Be Seen Beyond that Voice"; Transliteration: "Koremade no Ohanashi (Kōhen) / Koe no Mukou ni Mieru Mono" (Japanese: これまでのお話 （後編）/ 声の向こうに見えるもの) | Ken Andō (15); Yoshiaki Iwasaki (15 1/2) | Hideaki Anno | January 8, 1999 |
The first half is a recap episode, summarizing the events of episodes 9 through 13. The second half is about Asaba visiting Yukino at her home. Yukino finds out that Asaba lives alone due to an estrangement with his parents, particularly because of his inability to get along with his overly strict and formal father who resents his son's casual attitude. Eyecatch (15): Difficulties of all shapes and sizes (多事多難, Tajitanan) Eyecatch (15 1/2): Each day is like a thousand years (一日千秋, Ichijitsusenshū)
| 16 | "Eternal Interspersions"; Transliteration: "Eien no Tentei" (Japanese: 永遠の点綴) | Ken Andō | Hideaki Anno | January 15, 1999 |
The Miyazawa family visits Miyako's father, who does not get along with his son-in-law, Hiroyuki. When Hiroyuki and Miyako walk through the neighborhood they recall their past in an extended flashback. As a child 'Hiro' was a little terror who terrorized Miyako and the other children with his rough play but mellows as he grows older. They are shown meeting occasionally in the following years as she follows him into the same middle school and high school, two years behind. It is Hiro's fondest desire to grow up and support his beloved elderly grandfather, who raised him alone after his parents died, in the same way that he supported him. When his grandfather dies before he can graduate high school it is Miyako who consoles him and asks if she could be the one he could live for instead. They marry young, right after her graduation, infuriating her father and causing the rivalry between the two of them. Eyecatch: Born, raised, and the cycle repeats (生生流転, Seiseiruten)
| 17 | "His Return"; Transliteration: "Kare no Kyorai" (Japanese: 彼の去来) | Ken'ichi Kasai | Hideaki Anno | January 22, 1999 |
After Arima finally returns triumphant from his training and kendo tournament, having won the national championship, Yukino finds it hard to deal with her increased affection for him. Her inability to express her feelings causes her to draw away from him, even running away from him when he confronts her about her distant attitude. Only when Arima loses his composure, corners her, and desperately declares that he will "never let her go" does she realize how much she has hurt him and is able to explain her feelings. Eyecatch: A youth in the sunset (暮雲春樹, Bōnshunju)
| 18 | "Progress"; Transliteration: "Shinka" (Japanese: シン・カ) | Masahiko Ōtsuka | Hideaki Anno | January 29, 1999 |
During a family get-together Arima's extended family verbally harasses him (as usual) but his foster father stands up for him and declares that no one should speak ill of his beloved son. In the second half of the episode Yukino and Arima are able to spend some time alone and bring their relationship to a higher level by having sex at Arima's home. This level of closeness causes Arima to have a nightmare about his past. Eyecatch: Sexual liaison (朝雲暮雨, Chōunbō)
| 19 | "14 Days, Part 1" (Japanese: 14DAYS・1) | Ryūichi Kimura | Hiroyuki Imaishi | February 5, 1999 |
The new semester is underway. A mysterious transfer student, Tonami Takefumi, arrives, and preparations for the culture festival ignite Yukino's competitive spirit. Eyecatch: A fresh breeze, an old friend (清風故人, Seifūkojin) Note: This episode was made completely with paper cutouts over still backgrounds.
| 20 | "14 Days, Part 2" (Japanese: 14DAYS・2) | Iku Suzuki | Hideaki Anno | February 12, 1999 |
Explanation and flashback about Sakura Tsubaki and Tonami's childhood bully-victim relationship and how drastically Tonami has changed since that time. Aya writes a screenplay in hopes that Miyazawa and the others will perform it for the cultural festival. Eyecatch: Struggling against difficulties for the sake of vengeance (臥薪嘗胆, Gashinshōtan)
| 21 | "14 Days, Part 3" (Japanese: 14DAYS・3) | Hideki Okamoto | Hideaki Anno | February 19, 1999 |
Aya successfully catches Miyazawa and Maho and tricks them into reading the screen play she wrote. Tsubaki and Tonami's relationship (or lack thereof) becomes extremely rocky while Tonami and Miyazawa's becomes friendlier. Arima becomes jealous, but Miyazawa dashes his insecurities aside for the moment. Eyecatch: Deep sorrow and hidden worries (幽愁暗恨, Yūshūankon)
| 22 | "14 Days, Part 4" (Japanese: 14DAYS・4) | Daisuke Takashima | Hideaki Anno | February 26, 1999 |
Yukino and Maho assume lead parts in the play written by Aya Sawada. The girls form a drama club where Mr. Kawashima is a supervisor. Meanwhile, Arima becomes increasingly jealous and feels left out as Yukino spends a lot of time with her new friends. We also learn that Yukino's younger sister, Kano, is a big fan of Aya's stories. Eyecatch: In high spirits (気炎万丈, Kienbanjō)
| 23 | "14 Days, Part 5" (Japanese: 14DAYS・5) | Hiroyuki Ishidō | Shōji Saeki | March 5, 1999 |
After a couple of moments focusing on Miyazawa and Arima and then Tsubaki and Tonami, the focus stays on Miyazawa and the girls making the plans for the play. Eyecatch: Mutual love (落花流水, Rakkaryūsui)
| 24 / 24 1/4 / 24 1/2 / 24 3/4 | "A Story Different from So Far / A Review of What's Happened So Far (Chapter of Heaven/Earth/Man)"; Transliteration: "Imamade to chigau ohanashi / Koremade no osarai (Ten/Chi/Hito no maki)" (Japanese: 今までと違うお話 / これまでのおさらい「天 / 地 / 人ノ巻」) | Shōji Saeki | Hideaki Anno | March 12, 1999 |
The first half of the episode is made of new material, exploring Yukino's reaction to the emerging insecurities of Arima. The second half recaps the entire story in three parts. Eyecatch (24): Caring feelings for a friend (屋梁落月, Okuryōrakugetsu) Eyecatch (24 1/4 ): Even a fool has influence in the absence of a sage (瓦釜雷鳴, Gafuraimei); Eyecatch (24 1/2): Content with the old ways, never seeking progress (故歩自封, Kohojifū) Eyecatch (24 3/4): Intent on style, lacking in substance (咬文嚼字, Kōbunshakuji)
| 25 | "A Story Different from Up to Now"; Transliteration: "Kore Made to Chigau Ohanashi" (Japanese: これまでと違うお話) | Katsuichi Nakayama | Tatsuo Satō | March 19, 1999 |
This episode deviates from the main story, focusing on an anime original tangential story about the younger Miyazawa sisters, Kano in particular. Eyecatch: Onlookers see better than the players (傍目八目, Okamehachimoku)
| 26 | "14 Days, Part 6" (Japanese: 14DAYS・6) | Ken Andō | Ken Andō | March 26, 1999 |
Yukino becomes very friendly with Takefumi and Arima becomes very jealous and possessive of Yukino showing his dark side to Takefumi. Asaba explains to Takefumi that Arima is actually obsessive over his relationship with Yukino and the only reason Arima lets him hang out with her because Arima knows that he will never touch her. The second half shows Takefumi kissing Sakura and telling her that it was his first kiss and does not know why he did that. The series ends with Takefumi acknowledging his love towards Sakura and thinking how the future will be. Eyecatch: Existence and nonexistence give rise to one another (有無相生, Umusōsei) Note: This episode was done almost completely in the style of a manga, with very little actual dialogue and animation.

=== Soundtracks ===
Four CD soundtracks have been released in Japan for the anime series by the StarChild label of Japan's King Records. The first, His and Her Circumstances: Act 1.0 (彼氏彼女の事情 ACT 1.0) contained 24 tracks, including musical scores by Shirō Sagisu and songs written by Fumiya Fujii and Yōsui Inoue. It was released in Japan on December 23, 1998; Geneon released the CD in the US on January 20, 2004. His and Her Circumstances: Act 2.0 (彼氏彼女の事情 ACT 2.0), containing an additional 25 tracks, followed in Japan on February 26, 1999, and in the US on November 1, 2005. The third volume, His and Her Circumstances: Act 3.0 (彼氏彼女の事情 ACT 3.0), also contained 25 tracks. It was released in Japan on May 28, 1999. The three CDs were released as a box set in Japan, along with a fourth disc containing an additional 22 tracks, on February 23, 2005.

== Reception ==
Overall reviews for the series have been positive. The tenth volume of the series was listed as the top selling graphic novel in Japan on October 31, 2000. In The Anime Encyclopedia: A Guide to Japanese Animation Since 1917, Jonathan Clements and Helen McCarthy praised the anime adaptation for its innovative techniques and the use of "surreal 'cartoon' effects." THEM anime reviews gave the anime adaptation a good review calling it "probably the most disarmingly honest shoujo romance ever made." Alexander Harris from Anime News Network called the anime adaptation very character driven, saying "If you love diving into the minds of a character and searching for those juicy naughty bits, and all the while being entertained and educated, then this is for you."
