= Tonari wa Nani o Kūhitozo =

Japanese manga series

- First tankōbon volume cover

トナリはなにを食う人ぞ
- Genre: Cooking; Romantic comedy
- Manga
- Written by: Yuki Fujitsuka
- Published by: Hakusensha
- Imprint: Hana to Yume Comics
- Magazine: Ane LaLa
- Original run: January 5, 2015 – March 3, 2017
- Volumes: 3
- Manga

Tonari wa Nani o Kūhitozo Horoyoi
- Written by: Yuki Fujitsuka
- Published by: Hakusensha
- Imprint: HC Special
- Magazine: Manga Park
- Original run: April 5, 2018 – present
- Volumes: 15

Tonari wa Nani o Kūhitozo (トナリはなにを食う人ぞ) is a Japanese manga series written and illustrated by Yuki Fujitsuka. It was originally published as a one-shot in Hakusensha's shōjo manga magazine LaLa in July 2014. It was later serialized in the Ane LaLa magazine from January 2015 to March 2017. A sequel manga, titled Tonari wa Nani o Kūhitozo Horoyoi, began serialization on the Manga Park website in April 2018.

== Plot ==
Suzuna Inaba moves to Tokyo to attend university and seek accommodation. As she gets there, she wants to make a great first impression, but she suddenly runs out of money and becomes exhausted. Luckily for her, her university classmate Harumi Seto comes to her rescue with food, and teachers her how to cook for herself.

== Publication ==
Written and illustrated by Yuki Fujitsuka, Tonari wa Nani o Kūhitozo was originally published as a one-shot in Hakusensha's shōjo manga magazine LaLa on July 24, 2014. It was later serialized in the Ane LaLa magazine from January 5, 2015, to March 3, 2017. Its chapters were collected in three volumes from September 4, 2015, to July 5, 2017.

A sequel manga, titled Tonari wa Nani o Kūhitozo Horoyoi, began serialization on Hakusensha's Manga Park manga website on April 5, 2018. The sequel's chapters have been collected into fifteen volumes as of September 4, 2026.

=== Tonari wa Nani o Kūhitozo ===
No.	Release date	ISBN
1	September 4, 2015	978-4-59-219538-2
2	September 5, 2016	978-4-59-219539-9
3	July 5, 2017	978-4-59-221094-8

=== Tonari wa Nani o Kūhitozo Horoyoi ===
No.	Release date	ISBN
1	September 5, 2018	978-4-59-221809-8
2	March 5, 2019	978-4-59-221810-4
3	September 5, 2019	978-4-59-221859-3
4	April 3, 2020	978-4-59-222710-6
5	September 4, 2020	978-4-59-222786-1
6	March 5, 2021	978-4-59-222787-8
7	September 3, 2021	978-4-59-222846-2
8	February 4, 2022	978-4-59-222847-9
9	August 5, 2022	978-4-59-222848-6
10	March 3, 2023	978-4-59-222849-3
11	November 2, 2023	978-4-59-222850-9
12	August 5, 2024	978-4-59-223032-8
13	April 4, 2025	978-4-59-223066-3
14	December 5, 2025	978-4-59-223103-5
15	September 4, 2026	978-4-59-223161-5

== Reception ==
The series has 1 million copies in circulation as of November 2023.
