= Meca Tanaka =

Japanese manga artist

Meca Tanaka 田中メカ
- Born: December 23 Aichi Prefecture
- Area: Manga artist
- Notable works: Omukae desu, Faster than a Kiss

Meca Tanaka (田中メカ, Tanaka Meka) (born December 23 in Aichi Prefecture) is a Japanese shojo manga artist. Two of her major works are Omukae desu and Faster than a Kiss. Pearl Pink was released in English by Tokyopop. Young Master's Revenge, or Kimi no Koto nado Zettai ni & Meteor Prince are both released in English by Viz Media.

== Works ==
Title	Year	Notes	Refs
Omukae desu	1999–2002	Serialized in LaLa magazine Published by Hakusensha in 5 volumes	
Pearl Pink	2002–04	Serialized in LaLa magazine Published by Hakusensha in 4 volumes	
Sailor Fuku ni Onegai! (セーラー服にお願い!)	2005–06	Serialized in LaLa magazine Published by Hakusensha in 4 volumes	
Jikanme Rhapsody (7時間目ラプソディー)	2006	Serialized in LaLa Dx magazine Published by Hakusensha in 7 volumes	
Faster than a Kiss	2007–12	Serialized in LaLa magazine Published by Hakusensha in 12 volumes	
Shichigatsu no Mahoutsukai (7月の魔法使い)	2009	Serialized in LaLa magazine Published by Hakusensha in 1 volume	
Meteor Prince	2013–14	Serialized in LaLa magazine Published by Hakusensha in 2 volumes	
Kimi no koto nado zettai ni (君のコトなど絶対に)	2014–2017	Serialized in LaLa magazine Published by Hakusensha in 4 volumes	
