= Meteor Prince =

Romance manga series

- Cover of volume 1 (Viz Media edition)

おとめとメテオ (Otome to Meteo)
- Genre: romance
- Manga
- Written by: Meca Tanaka
- Published by: Hakusensha
- English publisher: Viz Media
- Magazine: LaLa
- Original run: March 23, 2013 – February 24, 2014
- Volumes: 2

Meteor Prince (おとめとメテオ, Otome to Meteo; lit. "A Girl and a Meteor") is a Japanese romance shōjo manga series written and illustrated by Meca Tanaka. Published by Hakusensha, it was serialized on LaLa magazine from March 23, 2013 to February 24, 2014, with two volumes compiling the chapters released. It is published in English by Viz Media.

== Characters ==
- Hako Natsuno - a 16-year-old girl with the worst luck ever. She is named the "Queen of Bad Luck" amongst her schoolmates, and her only friends consist of Erina, Morino Matchan, and the president of the Occult Club. The president allowed her into their group on the condition that Hako allow them to research the source of her bad luck (Argo later states that it is from a "dark spot" of bad luck on her heart). Regardless of how much misfortune falls on Hako, she manages to remain kind, caring, and optimistic, though she is also somewhat self-conscious since her bad luck tends to affect others. She is originally put-off and overwhelmed by Io's advances, but slowly begins to fall in love with him.
- Io - an alien Prince from the planet Yupita who crash-landed on earth to mate with Hako, who he believes shares the same heart wavelength as him. Io is very polite, curious, and easily excited, but will go to extreme measures to protect Hako from danger or harm, even threatening to kill Hako's ex-boyfriend for hurting her feelings when he broke up with her several years ago. Unfamiliar with emotions of love, he relentlessly pursues Hako using information he gathers from old shojo novels and encyclopedias. Eventually, he does come to genuinely fall in love with Hako, but he is unaware of it. Argo reveals that Io is the prince of the warrior clan of Yupita, located in a war zone, making it extremely important for Io to have strong babies. He has a large range of magical powers, and can expand his knowledge database by hugging, kissing, or touching.
- Erina - one of Hako's friends. She has short hair and is shown to be sweet and soft-spoken. She usually has some sort of common sense and is more controlled in her thoughts and actions than the other friends.
- Morino Matchan - Hako's very protective tomboyish friend. Morino is always on the lookout for Hako, and is shown to have been protective of her since they were children. She is extremely tough and straightforward, and does not hide her dislike and distrust of Io, often getting physically aggressive to keep him away from Hako. It is hinted that she may have a crush on the Occult Club president after she saw him without his glasses.
- Occult Club President - a friend of Hako, and the president of the Occult Club Hako is part of. He invited Hako into the club on the condition that she allow the club to research the source of her bad luck. His spells and portal incantations were the reason for Io to go off-course and fall to earth. The president is shown to be the son of a wealthy CEO for a company, thus he often uses his money and position to solve problems and create solutions for his friends. Despite this, he is depicted to have a nerdy personality, and is highly interested in extraterrestrial sciences. He is hard-working and is always available to help his friends. He seems to be oblivious to the fact that he is quite handsome without his glasses on.
- Argo - Io's soft-spoken yet wise advisor. He comes to earth to offer Io guidance. He breaks the news that Io crash-landed on earth by mistake due to the Occult Club president's magic incantation. He is extremely tall and is shown to like ice cream.

== Volumes ==
- 1 (November 5, 2013; English: January 6, 2015)
- 2 (May 2, 2014; English: April 7, 2015)

== Reception ==
Volume 1 reached the 40th place on the weekly Oricon manga charts and, as of November 10, 2013, had sold 19,310 copies.

On Anime News Network, Rebecca Silverman gave volume 1 an overall grade of B, calling it "a fun story that manages to be sweet and silly rather than slightly dangerous, which it very easily could have been." Also on Anime News Network, Jason Thompson said the manga "doesn't have many surprises, but it has more humor and better art than Omukae desu [another work by the same author]".
