= Mikan Enikki =

Japanese manga series

- Volume 1 tankōbon cover of Mikan Enikki

みかん・絵日記
- Genre: Slice of life, comedy
- Manga
- Written by: Miwa Abiko
- Published by: Hakusensha
- Imprint: Hana to Yume Comics
- Magazine: LaLa
- Original run: June 1988 – January 1995
- Volumes: 14
- Manga

Mikan Enikki Tokubetsuhen
- Written by: Miwa Abiko
- Published by: Hakusensha
- Imprint: Hana to Yume Comics
- Magazine: Hana to Yume
- Volumes: 3
- Anime television series
- Directed by: Noboru Ishiguro
- Music by: Tomoki Hasegawa
- Studio: Nippon Animation
- Original network: JNN (CBC, TBS)
- Original run: October 16, 1992 – June 18, 1993
- Episodes: 31

Mikan Enikki (Japanese: みかん・絵日記; "Mikan's Picture Diary") is a manga series written and illustrated by Miwa Abiko. It was featured in Hakusensha's magazine LaLa from June 1988 to January 1995.

A TV anime (stylized みかん絵日記) loosely based on the manga was produced by Nippon Animation and ran from October 16, 1992, to June 18, 1993, on CBC Television, TBS and other JNN affiliates.

== Plot ==
Tom, an orange cat, the protagonist of the story, had to leave his home after his owner had died due to illness. After wandering around for a while, he finally arrived at the Kusanagi family, where he was adopted and given a new name, Mikan, based on his orange fur (mikan is the Japanese word for "orange fruit"), but the Kusanagis soon found out that Mikan was no ordinary cat: he could speak human, and could walk on his hind limbs like a human. Shocked at first, the family gradually adopted a more welcoming attitude, and finally accepted the fun-loving cat as one of them. From then on, Mikan got on numerous adventures in the human world as a talking cat, which was kept secret by the Kusanagis. Mikan later got "married", had children, and one of them could also speak human like he did.

Apart from the typical slice-of-life stories, the manga also had some pure fantasy chapters, where Mikan and his gang, through various random means, got into different worlds of magic and dragons. These stories were never adapted for TV.

The TV anime adaptation had a similar premise, featured characters and some plot points from the manga (such as Mikan's backstory, a few relationships between characters, the short travel arc, etc.), but all of its story execution was entirely original. Overall, the manga stories tend to be long and introspective, while the anime stories tend to be short, eventful and suspenseful.

== Characters ==
=== Kusanagi family ===
Mikan Kusanagi (草凪 みかん, Kusanagi Mikan)
Voiced by: Tarako
The titular character who was an orange cat who could talk and walk on two feet like a human. He was abandoned with his siblings on the countryside road, then adopted and named Tom (トム, Tomu) (after Tom Cat) by an old man known as Tatsuzō. After his original owner died because of an unmentioned disease, he had to leave his home as the neighborhood couldn't accept an abnormally "witchy", yokai-like cat, even though his owner's friend, an old woman, insisted that she would take care of him. He then wandered around aimlessly, concealing his unusual abilities by walking on all fours and not talking (although sometimes he would still do those if he thought he was alone), until he met a boy who shared his name, Tom Kusanagi. He proceeded to follow the boy to the home of the Kusanagis. The family later adopted Tom, and Tom Kusanagi named him Mikan (Japanese for "orange fruit") based on his orange fur. The family soon found out that Tom was no ordinary cat: he could speak human and walked on his two hind paws. The first one to discover this was Tom Kusanagi, who found it suspicious that Mikan routinely got sick in the morning and refused to have breakfast, while at the same time, the amount of sake in the kitchen kept declining. It turned out that Mikan had been sneaking in there and drinking it while everyone was sleeping at night. Tom later convinced Mikan to tell his parents about his abilities so that he could finally be one of the family, as he couldn't stand keeping it a secret from his parents, who loved Mikan that much. Mikan was reluctant at first, as people's response to his abilities had been anything but positive, but he decided to give it a try. And fortunately, the family welcomed his presence, accepted him as one of them, although they still wanted to keep all of this a secret not to get Mikan in any trouble. Mikan later made new friends with the cats in the neighborhood, and engaged in several adventures with his gang. He eventually "married" a cat named Killy and had kittens; one of them, Ringo, was later adopted by the Kusanagis, too, and then learned to speak human like his father. In the manga, as nosy as he was, Mikan was quite well-behaved. In the anime, however, he was made to be more of a selfish troublemaker who did anything he liked as he was pleased, and he could also musically enunciate with the harmonica to bother pretty much everyone (human and feline alike). On the other hand, thanks to his experience as a stray cat, he was also quite sensible, even more so than Tom when it came to adult affairs. Despite that, he still maintained a childlike mindset of a cat and sometimes even equated human matters with feline ones, or had a hard time fathoming the concepts of "foreign", "Australia" or "America".
Tom Kusanagi (草凪 吐夢, Kusanagi Tomu)
Voiced by: Akiko Hiramatsu
The only biological son of the Kusanagi family and Mikan's adoptive brother. He was an ingenuous, caring 11-year-old brother, who assigned Mikan the picture diary homework, a common type of homework for Japanese grade schoolchildren, to record his daily life with words and illustrations, which was the solution to Mikan's strong interest in helping his brother with 5th grade homework (even though Mikan could do nothing but write hiragana and numbers). After that, Mikan started to document his daily life with the diary, filling it with untidy scribbles and illustrations. Like any other sibling, Tom quarreled with Mikan a lot. He went to Yozakura Elementary School during the course of the manga.
Tōjirō Kusanagi (草凪 藤治郎, Kusanagi Tōjirō)
Voiced by: Kenichi Ono
Tom's 37-year-old birth father and Mikan's adoptive father, working as a computer engineer. He wasn't welcoming Mikan at first, even went so far to say that he would have only adopted a dog. Later, he became a loving father who gave both of his sons valuable lessons on life and love. He also enjoyed having drinks with Mikan. In the manga, he was always an understanding father and husband, and never fought with his wife, which is why the girl Tom liked, Kyōko, adored him so much. That was not the case in the anime, as shown when he got home late and got angry because his wife, who was also upset about him being late, didn't prepare dinner.
Kikuko Kusanagi (草凪 菊子, Kusanagi Kikuko)
Voiced by: Sumi Shimamoto
Tom's 34-year-old birth mother and Mikan's adoptive mother, née Matsuzawa. A typical stay-at-home mother, she took care of the whole family, which made daily activities a little bit more difficult when she had to leave home to take care of her own sick mother. She was scared of height. She also gave birth to a girl, although the Kusanagis' daughter wasn't mentioned much in the course of the manga.
Ringo Tanabe (田辺 りんご, Tanabe Ringo)
Voiced by: Etsuko Kozakura
Mikan and Killy's son. He was named, by Tom just like his father was, Ringo (Japanese for "apple") due to his red fur, and also nicknamed Koringo (こりんご) (lit. "Little Apple") because Mikan felt like Ringo wasn't good enough considering apples tend to be bigger than oranges. He was the only one of Mikan's children who were adopted by the Kusanagis; the rest were given away to other people. Ringo managed to learn to speak human somehow, which was tremendous to the Kusanagis, although this caused a little bit of a problem at first as Mikan then lost his ability to speak for unknown reasons. Sera, Tom's best friend, even said it was probably because there could be only one talking cat in the world which was rather crushing to Mikan. Fortunately, everything was back to normal when Mikan regained his ability to speak somehow. Ringo could speak intelligibly, although with a few impediments (he said otō-tan, okā-tan and Tomu-kyun instead of the correct otō-san "dad", okā-san "mom" and Tomu-kun). He called Tōjirō "Dad" and Mikan "Dad Mikan" (simply "Mikan" when he first uttered to the shock and slight disappointment of his own father). Ringo later moved to live with Yukio Tanabe, a lonely old woman who he and his girlfriend Kyara adored so much. In the anime, he was known only as Koringo, and even to the end, could still mimic only random human words (especially food-related ones). The whole event of Mikan losing his ability to speak human from the manga (at which point, Ringo could speak fairly competently) was never adapted.

=== Other cats and dogs ===
Kurobuchi (クロブチ)
Voiced by: Katsumi Suzuki
His name literally means "black rims" in reference to his fur pattern. He was the wisecrack guy of the gang and Mikan's best buddy. Originally a half-stray cat (a cat who sometimes takes food that people give away), he was adopted by the owner of the Runon coffee shop as the main attraction of the shop, as Kurobuchi looked very much like him. He eventually "married" Hana after overcoming all the obstacles in their epic romance story and have a bunch of kittens, one of whom was a daughter who looked just like him. In the anime, Kurobuchi is portrayed as "lady's man": he brought food to all the cat ladies he knew. His subsequent relationship with Hana was only minimally denoted in a few small gags.
Botan (牡丹)
Voiced by: Masahiro Anzai
His name means "tree peony", but also "wild boar meat", perhaps because he was the biggest and fattest cat in the story, weighing 13 kilograms. He really adored his owner Yayoi, got along with her parents-in-law, but at the same time, despised her husband Yukihiko (him and him alone) just as much and bullied him every time he could. He dated Molly even though he was castrated. He was a Chinchilla Persian cat. In the anime, it wasn't clear if he dated anyone at all.
Karma (カルマ, Karuma)
Voiced by: Hiro Yūki
A shy Siamese cat who couldn't help but upsetting his owner by frequently "accidentally" peeing where he wasn't supposed to, which got him punished by being locked out, which in turn made him feel like he wasn't loved. That proved not to be true, as he found out when all of his family rushed home from vacation after they had heard a burglar had broken into their home, only to check on him. Thankfully, there was still his cat gang who helped him fend off the intruder and he could "reunite" with his family in tears. In the anime, Karma was neutered sometime as mentioned episode 23. He went on to turn gay and hit on Kurobuchi, even so far as to be jealous of Hana. Nothing much was mentioned about his relationship with his owners.
Momojirō Inagaki (稲垣 桃治郎, Inagaki Momojirō)
Voiced by: Chō
Nicknamed Momoji (ももじ) or Momo-chan (ももちゃん), he was a dog who loved cats because he had been raised by a cat mother and grown up with kittens. He lived with Dr. Inagaki during the time his original owner and Inagaki's close friend, Mr. Ōhashi, was overseas. He was Mikan's close friend. Mikan would unleash him and take him to the playground where Mikan played with him until he was tired and fell asleep. That, however, led to trouble one day, as Momoji decided, when Mikan was still sleeping, to just walk straight to Tokyo which was very far away to see his owners, not knowing that they hadn't arrived from overseas just yet. When learning this, Mikan had to call on all the cats in the neighborhood and went in search of Momoji. Thankfully, they found him eventually and took him home. He was later adopted by Dr. Inagaki.
Chibitarō (チビタロウ)
Voiced by: Junko Asami
Stefan Odin Rodrugsky (ステファン・オージーヌ・ロドルグスキー, Sutefan Ōjīnu Rodorugusukī), nicknamed Chibitarō due to his small stature, and Ste-chan by his owner, was a Russian Blue. He lived with a rich family and enjoyed the most luxury treats, but he rarely got to get out of the house and hang out with everyone. His character was expanded in the anime in a full episode in which he snuck out of his home with Mikan to explore the unfamiliar world and have fun with snow.
Kenzō (賢三)
Voiced by: Megumi Tano
Botan's close friend, he lived with a fishmonger. He was very good at catching mice as he'd grown up in a farmhouse, as opposed to Botan who was terrible at it. Despite living among an abundance of fish, he was well-behaved and never dared to steal from his owner.
Killy (キリー, Kirī)
Voiced by: Naoko Matsui
She had been abandoned on the street with her twin sister, Molly, as newborn kittens, until Dr. Inagaki found them during his stroll with Momojirō and brought them home, because the two kids who were crying over them wouldn't leave because they felt sorry for them but weren't allowed to keep them, and Momojirō would not stop snuggling the kittens. Inagaki, however, tried to give them away as soon as he could due to his dislike of animals, but failed because even though there were some potential adopters, they all changed their minds at the last minute, despite Mikan's best effort to spread the word (by walking around town with balloons and posters tied to his tail). The Kusanagis were so concerned about this that they had to resort to adopting both of them for fear that Dr. Inagaki might want to abandon them again, only to learn that he decided to keep them in the end. She was given a red collar to help distinguish herself from Molly, although she grew up to be slimmer than her sister. She "married" Mikan (who, for some reason, didn't seem to ever age) and had kittens, one of whom was Ringo. In the manga, her "marriage" with Mikan simply happened in secret, the result of which was discovered by Dr. Inagaki when he felt like her body was getting bigger, almost like Molly. In the anime, there was more drama to this: Dr. Inagaki strenuously rejected their relationship, to the point that they had to "elope" to an abandoned house. In the end, he could do nothing but accept it when Killy got pregnant.
Molly (モリー, Morī)
Voiced by: Yōko Kawanami
Killy's twin sister, found on the street and adopted by Dr. Inagaki. She was given a yellow collar to help distinguish herself from Killy, although she grew to be chubbier than her sister. She dated Botan despite the fact that he was castrated. In the anime, it wasn't shown if she dated anyone at all.
Hana (華)
Voiced by: Miyuki Matsushita
Botan's little sister, she was smaller and much slimmer than her brother. Her owner was a strict woman who always wanted her to mate with another Persian against her will to keep her kittens purebred, and firmly rejected her true love, Kurobuchi. Despite all the obstacles, she managed to elope with Kurobuchi. She came home eventually to reunite with her owner, both were sorry, but it was a happy ending for everyone involved.
Jerry (ジェリー, Jerī)
Voiced by: Chika Sakamoto
Mikan's brother who'd also been taken care of by Tatsuzō until he was given away. He was named after Jerry Mouse, which might not have been intentionally in an ironic way. There was nothing much mentioned about him in the manga afterwards. In the anime, however, he played a much more significant role. For some reasons, he turned into a cynical stray cats. Mikan thought he was betrayed (perhaps abandoned again by his adopters). It was the music box he unknowingly stole from Mrs. Fumie that made them both recognized each other, because it happened to be playing the same song their grandpa used to play and sang to (also the first ending theme of the anime, Ojii-san e no Otegami "Letter to Grandpa") as they were fighting. He was very attached to the box and refused to give it back, until Mikan told him that grandpa was dead, and the old happy days would never come back. In the end, he gave it back, and decided to continue his journey as a stray cat, but both of them would forever treasure memories about each other.
Miina
A chubby calico who Tom thought of as ugly, but who Mikan adored really much as she reminded him of a mother figure he never really had. Mikan brought food to her during the time she was raising her kittens to prove his love, but also to rival her kittens' father, Nora Boss. He and Nora Boss had bloody fights that left them scratched all over. During the last fight, Mikan won, but Miina intervened, shoved him away and shielded Nora Boss. It now dawned on Mikan that Nora Boss had always been her true love. That was the first time Mikan experienced the pain of unrequited love.

=== Yozakura Elementary School ===
Sera Kusuki (楠木 世良, Kusuki Sera)
Voiced by: Kazue Ikura
An eccentric and energetic transfer student. As Tom and Mikan's closest friend, he was very straightforward: if he knew he couldn't do something, he'd stop doing it, unlike Tom who just kept on trying. He, however, was also very sharp as he found out himself about Mikan's secret abilities while playing video games with him, although you can count on him because he would never share this with anyone else due to his selfishness. He and Mikan routinely got into antics, like the time he told Mikan to look up under girls' skirts to check out their panties. Sera was blunt and a little tacky in the manga. In the anime, he was even more cunning and confident, which was shown when he talked back to Mr. Hayashida on what he should do as a teacher and made him concede. The major plot point of Sera discovering Mikan's ability to talk in the manga, however, was never adapted for the anime, which downplayed his significance.
Kyōko Tachibana (立花 杏子, Tachibana Kyōko)
Voiced by: Junko Asami
Tom's love interest, although she had a crush on his father because he was her ideal model of a husband and father, which motivated Tom to strive to be a better man than his father. She loved cats, but she couldn't have one until her family moved out of their apartment to their own house, only then they adopted an Abyssinian cat and named her Stella. Tom always had a big crush on Kyōko, both in the manga and the anime. In the anime, however, this plot point is exploited more, in that Tom is portrayed as too shy and clumsy to ever muster enough courage to confess to her, and Mikan the busybody had to do everything he could, even faking Tom's voice, to set them up. Kyōko never adopted a cat in the anime, and her family was never shown to have their own house to begin with.
Shizuyo Okuda (奥田 しづよ, Okuda Shizuyo)
Voiced by: Chisa Yokoyama
The daughter of the owner of the Runon coffee shop. She was simply an unnamed background character in the manga, but she had a more significant role in the anime as she was Kyōko's best friend and she convinced her father to adopt Kurobuchi.
Mr. Hayashida (林田先生, Hayashida-sensei)
Voiced by: Katsumi Suzuki
The chief teacher in charge of Tom's class in the anime. He was a younger-looking than his manga counterpart.
Ms. Fujiwara
A music teacher and anime-only character, she gave Mr. Hayashida a mug, which Tom broke when he failed to get Mikan to get home during the day Mikan went to his school to play because he was bored.

=== Other supporting characters ===
Taizō Inagaki (稲垣 大造, Inagaki Daizō)
Voiced by: Takkō Ishimori
A 55-year-old doctor who worked at his own clinic. He appeared to hate animals even though he had to take care of Momojirō for his friend, Mr. Ōhashi, who was overseas. It was revealed later that he actually liked animals as a kid, but because there was no common birth control method back then for animals, his family couldn't afford to keep the baby pets and had to abandon them on the street, which led to his "dislike" for animals in general. He told the Kusanagis, who were about to adopt Killy and Molly, this story, which warmed him up to the kittens and made him decide to keep them (he did not tell them in the anime, though). Also, he later just told Mr. Ōhashi that he would keep Momojirō which proved his sincere fondness for animals.
Okiyo (お清)
Voiced by: Atsuko Mine
Housekeeper, and later, wife of Dr. Taizō Inagaki in the manga. She only appeared in early anime episodes and it was unknown if she married Dr. Inagaki later at all.
Ōhashi (大橋)
Voiced by: Eken Mine
Momojirō's original owner and Dr. Inagaki's close friend. He let Dr. Inagaki take care of his dog during the time he was working in Melbourne, Australia. When he and his wife came back to Japan bringing another dog, they wanted to take Momojirō with them overseas, but Dr. Inagaki just decided that he would keep Momojirō as he thought having two dogs would be too much for an old couple, and he was also very fond of Momojirō. After a little bit of an argument, the Ōhashi agreed to let Inagaki have him. Momojirō then had a new name, Momojirō Inagaki. In the anime, it was never shown if he ever entrusted Momojirō to Dr. Inagaki forever at all, or just for the time he was away.
Yayoi Sasamori (笹森 弥生, Sasamori Yayoi)
Voiced by: Yoshino Takamori
Née Fujiwara, she was a gentle 26-year-old nurse at Inagaki Clinic. Before she married Yukihiko, she lived with her cat, Botan, in an apartment. Her marriage basically turned Botan's world upside down, because as much as he loved her, he couldn't stand a sight of her husband. She had a son with Yukihiko. In the anime, it was never shown if she married Yukihiko at all.
Yukihiko Sasamori (笹森 由起彦, Sasamori Yukihiko)
Voiced by: Hikaru Midorikawa
Yayoi's 24-year-old husband. He was frightened of cats because they had caused him a lot of trauma, and it didn't help that he had to live with Botan and be bullied by him on a daily basis (as noted above, Botan was very big and strong and really hated Yukihiko), which was just of little concern to his own parents as they got along well with Botan. With the "help" of Mikan and his friends, Yukihiko gradually learned to get used to living with cats. In the anime, it was never shown if he married Yayoi at all, and his parents never made an appearance.
Tatsuzō (タツゾウ)
Voiced by: Minoru Yada
He rescued a litter of four abandoned kittens on the countryside road on a frigid winter day, but he couldn't save one of them (in the anime, there was no mentioning of a fourth kitten). He took care of the rest three, named them Tom, Jerry and Mary. Later, he gave Jerry and Mary away and kept only Tom. He found out that Tom was trying to say human words in an attempt to communicate with him, and then taught Tom to speak human, even though he always warned Tom not speak to anyone but him. The pair of "grandfather and grandson" had lived happily until Tatsuzō tragically died of illness. Tom had to leave as Tatsuzō's children couldn't accept a yōkai-like talking cat, but ultimately because he knew his grandpa would never be there again for him. Although having left his original home for a long time, Mikan would never forget about the happy times he had living with Tatsuzō.
o-Toyo (おトヨ)
Voiced by: Reiko Suzuki
Tatsuzō's friend, also classmate at elementary school. She promised to take care of Tom after Tatsuzō's death, although he refused and left town.
Fumie Matsuzawa (松沢 文江, Matsuzawa Fumie)
Voiced by: Hisako Kyōda
Kikuko's widowed mother, she wanted her daughter to inherit the family's business and opposed her relationship with Tōjirō because he didn't accept to take her family name and business due to his own passion. In the end, she couldn't do anything but support her daughter's marriage. She wished the Kusanagi couple to have a daughter to inherit her family name and business, a wish that was eventually granted. In the anime, she was portrayed as a strict woman who expected Tom to be as manly and strong as his grandfather and who detested cats, which bothered the whole family, and which led to Mikan having to take refuge for the first couple of days she was staying at their home. Out of all people, it was her own daughter Kikuko spoke out to her about her meddling, although in the end, they both realized how unfair they were to each other and made amends. Her attitude about cats also changed for the better after Jerry, who previously had taken the music box full of memories which was her husband's present to Kikuko, brought it back.
Shūichirō Kusanagi (草凪 柊一郎, Kusanagi Shūichirō)
Tōjirō's elder brother, he gave Tōjirō advice when his relationship with Kikuko was in crisis because of Fumie's intervention. Tōjirō's brother was only namelessly mentioned in the anime in a picture.
Ms. Yōkata
Chibitarō's owner and an anime-only character. She was rich and rather condescending toward others (people and cats alike) because she thought of them as less sophisticated. She was worried sick when Chibitarō snuck out on his own and went on to stick posters of him everywhere. When Sera brought him back, she tearfully rejoiced and gave Sera cookies and a gift ticket. She also tried to expose Mikan after overhearing him talking with Tom on the street, but lost embarrassingly to a cat's wit.

=== Manga-only characters ===
==== Cats and dogs ====
Kyara (伽羅)
Sera's Abyssinian kitten. At first, she was annoyed by the stalking of Mikan's gang as they attempted to get Ringo to have a friend of his age for the first time. She later warmed up to them and became Ringo's girlfriend; prior to this, he could only hang out with his father's "middle-aged" buddies. The two once had a big quarrel and stopped seeing each others for days after a failed attempt to make friends with Stella, but later made up.
Stella (ステラ, Sutera)
Kyōko's Himalayan kitten. She was adopted when Kyōko's family got their own house. She was defensive at first against Ringo and Kyara when Tom, Sera and Kyōko tried to get them to know each others, which resulted in Kyara and Ringo's quarrel as she couldn't accept her hostile attitude and he tried to reconcile them. The three later made a trio of good friends.
Umejirō (梅治郎)
A puppy Mr. Ōhashi brought back to Japan as he wanted to bring Momojirō with him to Australia.
Leila (レイラ, Reira)
Momojirō's "wife". She met Momojirō when he was on a stroll with Mikan. She later gave birth to Momojirō's puppies.
Ghee (ギー, Gī)
An old domestic-gone-stray cat. When Mikan first met him, he was always lying on top of that wall waiting for his owner who never came back. As winter came, the Kusanagis decided to keep him and take care of him. Perhaps because he had been a domestic cat himself, he was always well-behaved. His untimely death came as a shock to all the Kusanagis as everyone loved him, but also as it dawned on them that someday, they would also have to see their own cat, Mikan, die.
Toratora and Shimashima (とらとら・しましま)
Brothers of tabby cats in Mrs. Tanabe's neighborhood, so named based on their fur patterns. They became friends with Ringo after he moved to live with Mrs. Tanabe.
Manmaru (まんまる)
Toratora and Shimashima's mother, so named perhaps due to her chubby appearance.
Kisaburō (キサブロー)
A hotheaded young cat who just kept challenging Ringo into a fight to see who was better. He finally met his match and got beaten to a pulp by a stray cat. Luckily for him, Ringo came and shielded him from the attacks. Ringo later became some sort of a "brother figure" to him.
Mugi (麦)
An alley mother cat who struggled to feed her kittens. She and her babies were rescued by the Kusanagis with the help of Mikan's gang, and later they all got adopted by various adopters. She was featured only in the special edition series (みかん絵日記 特別編 Mikan Enikki Tokubetsuhen).

==== Humans ====
Kaoru Ōsumi (大澄 かおる, Ōsumi Kaoru)
A blunt, boyish, edgy young woman working in place of Yayoi since she got pregnant. Losing her friend to illness was her motive to become a nurse. After sloppily mistaking one of Dr. Inagaki's prescription which resulted in the patient getting sick (the patient was understanding enough to let it slide), she started to become more gentle and meticulous in her work.
Shinnosuke Kusanagi (草凪 信之介, Kusanagi Shinnosuke)
Tōjirō's father.
Ikaho Kusanagi (草凪 伊香保, Kusanagi Ikaho)
Tōjirō's mother, she was described as "female Kintarō" by Mikan.
Midoriha Seno (瀬野 翠葉, Seno Midoriha)
Kyōko's cousin, Sera's childhood friend in kindergarten and love interest. She was a tomboy who looked just like Tom, which may have explained why Sera liked Tom so much. Mikan even joked that it looked as if Sera had been hugging Tom affectionately when he, in fact, was hugging Midoriha. She was in the middle of a crisis when she came back to Japan as her parents was in the process of a divorce, and the only consolation was that she could meet Sera again. She later returned to Australia with her mother and step-father, and still exchanged letters with Sera.
Yukio Tanabe (田辺 雪緒, Tanabe Yukio)
A lonely old widow who Ringo adored so much. He and his girlfriend Kyara usually hanged out in her front yard. He decided to move to live with her when she got a fever. She and Sera were the only two people in town (other than the Kusanagis) who were aware of the existence of talking cats.
