= Agents of the Four Seasons =

Japanese light novel series

- First Japanese light novel volume cover, depicting the Agents of Winter (Rousei, left) and Spring (Hinagiku, right)

春夏秋冬代行者 (Shunkashūtō Daikōsha)
- Genre: Fantasy; Adventure
- Light novel
- Written by: Kana Akatsuki
- Illustrated by: Suoh
- Published by: ASCII Media Works
- English publisher: NA: Yen Press
- Imprint: Dengeki Bunko
- Original run: April 9, 2021 – present
- Volumes: 8
- Manga

Agents of the Four Seasons: Dance of Spring
- Written by: Kana Akatsuki
- Illustrated by: Nappa Komatsuka
- Published by: Hakusensha
- English publisher: NA: Yen Press
- Imprint: Hana to Yume Comics
- Magazine: LaLa
- Original run: July 23, 2022 – present
- Volumes: 8
- Manga

Agents of the Four Seasons: One Hundred Songs and One Hundred Pages
- Written by: Kana Akatsuki
- Illustrated by: Yuriko Asami
- Published by: ASCII Media Works
- English publisher: NA: Kadokawa
- Imprint: Dengeki Comics NEXT
- Magazine: Dengeki G's Comic
- Original run: May 15, 2023 – present
- Volumes: 3
- Anime television series

Agents of the Four Seasons: Dance of Spring
- Directed by: Ken Yamamoto
- Produced by: Shou Ootani
- Written by: Ayumu Hisao
- Music by: Kensuke Ushio
- Studio: Wit Studio
- Licensed by: Crunchyroll: SEA: Muse Communication
- Original network: Tokyo MX, GYT, GTV, BS11, MBS, CBC, RKB, HBC, AT-X
- Original run: March 29, 2026 – June 28, 2026
- Episodes: 14
- icon

Agents of the Four Seasons (Japanese: 春夏秋冬代行者, Hepburn: Shunkashūtō Daikōsha) is a Japanese light novel series written by Kana Akatsuki (author of Violet Evergarden) and illustrated by Suoh. It began publication under ASCII Media Works' light novel imprint Dengeki Bunko in April 2021. A manga adaptation of the first part illustrated by Nappa Komatsuka began serialization in Hakusensha's shōjo manga magazine LaLa in July 2022. An anime television series adaptation of the first part produced by Wit Studio aired from March to June 2026.

== Plot ==
=== Synopsis ===
In the beginning, there was Winter only. Unable to bear the loneliness in a world devoid of other seasons, he chose to cut off part of his vital essence to generate a new season, to whom he gave the name of "Spring". At the Mother Earth's wish, Winter again cut off his vital essence to give birth to Summer and Autumn, thus beginning the cycle of the four seasons. The Four Seasons visited every single corner of the world to perpetuate the cycle, until one day they decided to entrust this mission to Mother Earth's creatures, but none were capable of fulfilling the task. The Four Seasons fell into despair at having failed in their desired goal, until mankind made its appearance, willing to perform their duty in exchange for peace, prosperity and stability in its lands. The four deites of the seasons thus granted their powers to a small group of humans, who, over the centuries, have come to be known as the Agents of the Four Seasons.

=== Introduction ===
Each country has its own vision on how the world originated, however each one agrees on the nature of the seasons, the day and the night.

The seasons are given by the Agents through rituals of song and dance, while the day and the night are brought about by the arrows shot into the sky by the Archers of Dawn and Twilight.

The safety of these figures is put at risk by individuals who hate the changing of the seasons and/or the alternation of the day and the night, known as "Insurgents". Because of this reason, Agents and Archers have a guard at their side, with whom they often tend to develop a strong bond of codependency.

The story is set in contemporary times in the archipelago of Yamato, a land that rises in the middle of the ocean in the Far East, commonly called "Cherry Blossom of the East", due to the arrangement of its islands resembling the branches of a cherry blossom tree (N-to-S):

- Enishi (Hokkaido)
- Teishu (Honshu)
- Iyo (Shikoku)
- Tsukushi (Kyushu)
- Ryugu (Okinawa)

Like every other nation in the world, Yamato has its own Agents of the Four Seasons, each of whom has the duty to manifest their season in every part of the land.

The Agents of Spring and Summer begin their journey on the island of Ryugu then move north, while the Agents of Autumn and Winter begin their journey on the island of Enishi, then head south.

The role of "Agent" is bestowed by the deities of the seasons based on the physical, mental and spiritual eligibility of a blood descendant of the first Agent, and the chosen individual cannot in any way oppose their destiny. The bestowal occurs when the previous Agent dies or ceases to be eligible for the role.

It is possible for an Agent, due to insufficient preparation or drastic events, to be unable to manifest their season, consequently extending the duration of the previous one. This is the case of the Agent of Spring, Hinagiku Kayo, a 16-year-old girl who was kidnapped by the Insurgents at the age of just 6. As a result, spring hasn't manifested in Yamato for 10 years, and winter, instead of lasting 3 months like the other seasons, has lasted 6 months during this period of time.

However, the young Hinagiku has made her return and is now preparing to bring her season back to the nation, accompanied by her guard, Sakura Himedaka.

It all begins on February 10th of the year 20 of the Reimei era, on the island of Ryugu.

== Characters ==
The story, as a whole, does not feature a single character who constantly plays the leading role. Each major narrative arc (e.g., Dance of..., The Archer of...) features its corresponding Agent and Guard or Archer and Custodian.

=== Agents of the Four Seasons and Guards ===
Hinagiku Kayo (花葉 雛菊, Kayō Hinagiku)
Voiced by: Yuka Nukui (Japanese); Celeste Perez (English)
The Agent of Spring, possesses the ability of "Life Acceleration". She was kidnapped and held captive by the "Insurgents", natural enemies of the Agents of the Four Seasons, for almost ten years, during which spring did not occur. She has had feelings for Rosei since she was little. As an illegitimate daughter born of the head of Kayo family and his mistress, the previous Agent of Spring Kobai Yukiyanagi, her family treats her poorly even after her return. In her captivity Hinagiku was abused by the leader Misuzu Henderson both physically, emotionally and mentally. Hinagiku was also forced to cultivate plants for the Insurgents to be used as illegal drugs. After eight years Hinagiku snapped and nearly kills Misuzu and escaped, but she isolated herself from her duties for two years as the abuse affected her deeply.
Sakura Himedaka (姫鷹 さくら, Himedaka Sakura)
Voiced by: Kana Hanazawa (PV), Yoshino Aoyama (anime) (Japanese); Marisa Duran (English)
The Agent of Spring's Guard. She is an attendant who never stopped looking for Hinagiku, suffering regret for not being able to protect her charge. The love she felt for Itecho surpassed the adoration of a student towards her master, but due to a certain event she hates him deeply. Even after the Town of Spring and Winter stopped searching for Hinagiku, she continued to search for her alone.
Rosei Kantsubaki (寒椿 狼星, Kantsubaki Rōsei)
Voiced by: Shogo Sakata, Miyuri Shimabukuro (childhood) (Japanese); Alejandro Saab, Emily Fajardo (childhood) (English)
The Agent of Winter and currently the longest serving Agent. He possesses the ability "Life Coagulation". Being the cause of the kidnapping of his first love, Hinagiku, torments him.
Itecho Kangetsu (寒月 凍蝶, Kangetsu Itechō)
Voiced by: Satoshi Hino (PV, anime) (Japanese); Christopher Wehkamp (English)
The Agent of Winter's Guard. He has been Rosei's servant since he was a child, and was also Sakura's sword master. Like Rosei, he condemns himself for failing to protect the Hinagiku.
Ruri Hazakura (葉桜 瑠璃, Hazakura Ruri)
Voiced by: Sumire Uesaka (Japanese); Alexis Tipton (English)
The Agent of Summer, possesses the ability of "Life Operation". She has a sunny and kind nature, but she can't be honest with her older twin sister Ayame, because she doesn't want her to give up her role as her Guard.
Ayame Hazakura (葉桜 あやめ, Hazakura Ayame)
Voiced by: Ranko Baba (Japanese); Hayden Daviau (English)
The Agent of Summer's Guard. She is Ruri's older twin sister and her attendant. She plans to leave her post as a Guard on the occasion of her wedding. Despite being a victim of her sister's whims, she wishes for her happiness.
Nadeshiko Iwaizuki (祝月 撫子, Iwaizuki Nadeshiko)
Voiced by: Hime Sawada (Japanese); Emi Lo (English)
The Agent of Autumn, possesses the ability of "Life Putrefaction". She is the youngest and the shortest-serving deity. She has immense trust and affection for Rindou.
Rindo Azami (阿左美 竜胆, Azami Rindō)
Voiced by: Taku Yashiro (Japanese); Lee George (English)
The Agent of Autumn's Guard. He treats his job like a business, without letting his emotions get in the way. Those around him don't see it that way. He doesn't realize it, but he's overprotective of Nadeshiko.

=== Archers and Custodians of Dawn and Twilight ===
Kaya Fugeki (巫覡 花矢, Fugeki Kaya)
The Archer of Dawn, her task is to bring the Day to Yamato. She is a 16 y/o high school student with a masculine way of speech, but no one knows she's the Goddess of the Day, except Yuzuru. She deeply cares for Yuzuru. She tries to force him to abandon his role as Guardian so that he can gain the freedom she lacks.
Yuzuru Fugeki (巫覡 弓弦, Fugeki Yuzuru)
The Archer of Dawn's Custodian. He decided to serve Kaya in place of his father. He is proud of his work and is fond of Kaya, but is annoyed that she is trying to force him to abandon his role as her Custodian.
Kaguya Fugeki (巫覡 輝矢, Fugeki Kaguya)
The Archer of Twilight, his task is to bring Night to Yamato. He fell into depression after his wife and his custodian, Eken, suddenly ran away from home. His feelings for Tsukihi are difficult to explain in words.
Eken Fugeki (巫覡 慧剣, Fugeki Eken)
The Archer of Twilight's Custodian. He respects Kaguya and they once lived together as father and son, but one day, he ran away.

=== Towns of the Four Seasons ===
Birthplaces of the Agents of the Four Seasons. They represent autonomous institutions tasked with procreating, training, and protecting the Agents of the Four Seasons.

==== Town of Spring ====
Birthplace of the Agents of Spring, located on the island of Teishu.

Kobai Yukiyanagi (雪柳 紅梅, Yukiyanagi Kōbai)
Voiced by: Kana Hanazawa (Japanese); Monica Rial (English)
Former Agent of Spring and Hinagiku's mother. She fell in love with Shungetsu, with whom she had Hinagiku, but this gave rise to a series of disagreements within the village. She later committed suicide to end the discrimination and mistreatment toward her and her daughter.
Shungetsu Kayo (花葉 春月, Kayō Shungetsu)
Voiced by: Kōji Yusa
Head of the Kayo family. He's the father of Hinagiku and Zansetsu. He is as cold as Winter, probably the reason Kobai fell in love with him. His beloved's death has sparked an aversion to Hinagiku, who he ignores even though he officially acknowledged her.
Zansetsu Kayo (花葉 残雪, Kayō Zansetsu)
Spring Village Administrator. He's Hinagiku's half-brother. He's a wealthy boy, and his mother's a prosperous landowner. He knows Sakura and asks her to keep her sister unaware of the financial support he is providing to the two girls.
Tsubame Aboshi (阿星 燕, Aboshi Tsubame)
Zansetsu's servant. He grew up in the same orphanage as Sakura before being taken in by Zansetsu, whom he worships almost religiously. Despite his age, he performs his duties better than most adults in the village.

==== Town of Winter ====
Birthplace of the Agents of Winter, located on the island of Enishi.

Yukimi Todo (藤堂 雪見, Tōdō Yukimi)
Voiced by: Yu Miyazaki (Japanese); Aiden Call (English)
Member of the Town of Winter's elite security. He's a kind and caring agent who guards Hinagiku and Sakura on Rousei and Itechou's orders. He monitored Rousei and Hinagiku's relationship during the month of the Summoning of the Four Seasons.
Rintaro Shimotsuki (霜月 倫太郎, Shimotsuki Rintarō)
Voiced by: Hayato Kashiwazaki (Japanese); Mauricio Ortiz-Segura (English)
Member of the Town of Winter's elite security. Along with Todo, he guards the two girls on Rousei and Itechou's orders. He holds Itechou in high regard.

==== Town of Summer ====
Birthplace of the Agents of Summer, located on the island of Iyo.

Raicho Kimikage (君影 雷鳥, Kimikage Raichō)
Agent of Summer's Guard Candidate, Ruri's fiancé. He's a confident, sometimes arrogant man. Most people consider him weird, but he's kind and devoted to those he respects. He's madly in love with Ruri.
Renri Rouo (老鶯 連理, Rōō Renri)
Town of Summer doctor and Ayame's fiancé. He is a doctor affiliated with the town's medical practice. Despite his playboy appearance, he is kind and gentle. He wishes to marry Ayame, but there is a big secret between them.

==== Town of Autumn ====
Birthplace of the Agents of Autumn, located on the island of Tsukushi.

Miyabi Sanekazura (真葛美 夜日, Sanekazura Miyabi)
Head maid of the Town of Autumn Domestic Affairs Department. She is Nadeshiko's maid and works at the village's main shrine. She is strong-willed, caring, and skilled at her job. She can't help but love Nadeshiko and is happy to have been chosen as her head maid. Her family situation is a bit complicated.
Koyoi Shirahagi (白萩 今宵, Shirahagi Koyoi)
Member of the Town of Autumn's security. He is one of Rindo's closest subordinates and associates. He is a quiet, simple, and kind boy who takes care of Nadeshiko, but the little girl's guard dog does not seem to appreciate him and he often ends up being the victim of its pranks.

=== Institutions of Yamato ===
==== Agency of the Four Seasons ====
It is a NGO that manages the duties of the Agents of the Four Seasons, allocating funds to them and their corresponding towns.

Reiko Nagatsuki (長月 礼子, Nagatsuki Reiko)
Voiced by: Misato Matsuoka (Japanese); Dani Chambers (English)
Member of the Agency Autumn Division's Security Department. She is responsible for the Town of Autumn's security system. She is an intelligent woman with a career that allows her to operate flexibly. She considers Rindo a little brother.
Ishihara (石原, Ishihara)
Voiced by: Haruna Mikawa (Japanese); Cassie Ewulu (English)
An employee of the Agency of the Four Seasons' Security Department. She is assigned to the Agent of Winter's security and also serves as Rousei's psychologist. She is a calm woman with excellent qualities in her duties.

==== National Security ====
It's a government national defense organization that protects peace and security in Yamato.

Tsukihi Aragami (荒神 月燈, Aragami Tsukihi)
Special Agent of National Security. She's the captain of Kaguya's security. She was only appointed to this role temporarily, but she has deep respect and affection for him. She grew up in a family devoted to the gods.

=== Insurgents ===
Natural enemies of the Agents of the Four Seasons. They are divided into Reformists, whose goal is to threaten the Agents' safety to pressure institutions into changing the laws governing their divine powers, and Defeaters, whose goal is to eliminate the Agents out of hatred for the seasons.

Misuzu Henderson (観鈴・ヘンダーソン, Misuzu Hendaason)
Voiced by: Yoko Hikasa (Japanese); Stephanie Young (English)
Leader of the "Kasai" Reformist group. She's called "Gozen" and organized the attack on the Town of Winter where Hinagiku was kidnapped. In the past, Misuzu's father was the leader of the Insurgents. Misuzu once had a daughter, but her daughter died, leaving Misuzu traumatized. Feeling powerless, Misuzu decides to kidnap, ransom, and kill agents. She becomes obsessed with Hinagiku, whom she attempts to brainwash into acting as her daughter. After eight years of Misuzu's mental and physical torture, it finally becomes Misuzu's fatal mistake, especially of trying to impregnant Hinagiku with one of her henchmen. Hinagiku finally snaps and destroys the Insurgent base and escapes. Misuzu survives and goes into hiding, attempting to rebuild the organization in the meantime. Misuzu saw Nadeshiko and decided to do same thing she did to Hinagiku. Despite being nearly killed by Hinagiku, Misuzu wanted to recapture her.
Mikami (美上, Mikami)
Voiced by: Hinata Tadokoro (Japanese); David Matranga (English)
Misuzu's right-hand man. He has strong feelings for Misuzu despite his desire to leave the Reformists and start a new life.

=== Other characters ===
Nazuna (薺, Nazuna)
Voiced by: Nao Toyama (Japanese); Sarah Wiedenheft (English)
A little girl Hinagiku and Sakura meet while climbing Ryugu Peak. Her dramatic story prompts Hinagiku to perform the ritual of the Spring Manifestation. The little girl thus becomes the first witness of the return of Spring.

== Production ==
Kana Akatsuki reported that Agents of the Four Seasons was born while she was in charge of the scenario for the Sword Art Online: Alicization Lycoris DLC. Initially intended to be a self-contained volume, due to the large number of scenes to be represented, at the publisher's suggestion, it was intended to be released in two volumes, however this led the author to integrate many battle developments with frequent scene changes, which brought the work to its current state.

Akatsuki had always found some phenomena mysterious, leading her to ask "Why does the moon chase me?" and "Why do the seasons change?", but instead of seeking a scientific basis, she took pleasure in imagining them in a fantasy world. The work was created using the sensitivity of her childhood.

== Media ==
=== Light novel ===
Written by Kana Akatsuki and illustrated by Suoh, Agents of the Four Seasons began publication under ASCII Media Works' Dengeki Bunko light novel imprint on April 9, 2021. Eight volumes have been released as of December 2024.

During their panel at MCM Comic Con London 2023, Yen Press announced that they licensed the series for English publication.

No.	Title	Original release date	North American release date
1	Dance of Spring, Part I Haru no Mai (Jō) (春の舞 上)	April 9, 2021; 978-4-04-913584-8	November 28, 2023; 978-1-9753-7317-7
1. Chapter 1: "The Agent of Spring—Hinagiku Kayo"; 2. Chapter 2: "The Agent of Winter—Rosei Kantsubaki"; 3. Chapter 3: "The Agent of Summer—Ruri Hazakura"; 4. Chapter 4: "The Agent of Autumn—Nadeshiko Iwaizuki"; 5. Chapter 5: "Rosei and Hinagiku"
2	Dance of Spring, Part II; Haru no Mai (Ge) (春の舞 下)	April 9, 2021; 978-4-04-913753-8	March 19, 2024; 978-1-9753-7319-1
1. Prologue: "The Agent of Spring—Kobai Yukiyanagi"; 2. Chapter 1: "The Agent of Spring—Hinagiku Yukiyanagi"; 3. Chapter 2: "The Guard of Spring—Sakura Himedaka"; 4. Chapter 3: "The Four Seasons"; 5. Epilogue: "Dance of Spring"
3	Dance of Summer, Part I Natsu no Mai (Jō) (夏の舞 上)	July 8, 2022; 978-4-04-913944-0	July 23, 2024; 978-1-9753-7321-4
1. Prologue: "My Goddess, My Sister"; 2. Chapter 1: "Guard of Summer—Guard of Summer-Ayame Hazakura"; 3. Chapter 2: "The Archer of Twilight—Kaguya Fugeki"; 4. Chapter 3: "Agent and Guard of Spring and Winter"; 5. Chapter 4: "Goddesses Incarnate of Summer—The Hazakura Sisters"; 6. Chapter 5: "Zansetsu Kayo"; 7. Chapter 6: "Bridegroom of Summer"; 8. Chapter 7: "Nocturne of Wolves"; 9. Chapter 8: "Serenade of Winter, Spring, and Autumn"; 10. Chapter 9: "Caprice of Summer and Twilight"
4	Dance of Summer, Part II; Natsu no Mai (Ge) (夏の舞 下)	July 8, 2022; 978-4-04-913943-3	December 17, 2024; 978-1-9753-7323-8
1. Chapter 1: "March of Summer, Twilight, and the Lovers"; 2. Chapter 2: "Dirge of Cherry Blossoms and Butterflies"; 3. Chapter 3: "Intermezzo of the Ruler"; 4. Chapter 4: "Duet of Spring and Winter"; 5. Chapter 5: "Overture of the Hunt"; 6. Chapter 6: "Symphony of the Night and the Wolf"; 7. Chapter 7: "Lullaby of the God"; 8. Chapter 8: "Rhapsody of Summer Love"; 9. Chapter 9: "Hymn of the Four Seasons and Twilight"; 10. Epilogue: "Dance of Summer"
5	The Archer of Dawn; Akatsuki no Shashu (暁の射手)	January 7, 2023; 978-4-04-914686-8	August 26, 2025; 978-1-9753-9390-8
1. Chapter 1: "The Custodian of Dawn—Yuzuru Fugeki"; 2. Chapter 2: "The Archer of Dawn—Kaya Fugeki"; 3. Chapter 3: "Shard of a Star"; 4. Chapter 4: "The Council of Gods"; 5. Chapter 5: "Sharp-Witted Wolf"; 6. Chapter 6: "The Firefly Burns Bright on the Water"; 7. Chapter 7: "In the Land Up North"; 8. Chapter 8: "From Dawn to Twilight"; 9. Epilogue: "Treasure Every Arrow"
6	Dance of Autumn, Part I Aki no Mai (Jō) (秋の舞 上)	November 10, 2023; 978-4-04-915076-6	April 14, 2026; 979-8-8554-0769-3
1. Chapter 1: "Plums Wait Not for the Spring"; 2. Chapter 2: "Like a Mallow Loyal to the Sun"; 3. Chapter 3: "Flourish in Sync with the Season"; 4. Chapter 4: "Broader Perspective from One Blossom"; 5. Chapter 5: "Fruitless"; 6. Chapter 6: "The Morning Glory Dusks, Too"; 7. Chapter 7: "Proud Lotus in the Mud"; 8. Chapter 8: "Fallen Petals and Broken Mirrors Can Never Go Back"
7	Dance of Autumn, Part II; Aki no Mai (Ge) (秋の舞 下)	November 10, 2023; 978-4-04-915078-0	October 13, 2026; 979-8-8554-0772-3
1. Chapter 1: "Taking the Dragon's Treasure"; 2. Chapter 2: "Shadows Gathering"; 3. Chapter 3: "Constellation"; 4. Chapter 4: "Karma"; 5. Chapter 5: "Strike While the Iron Is Hot"; 6. Chapter 6: "Butterfly Effect'; 7. Chapter 7: "Destiny"; 8. Chapter 8: "Treading on Thin Ice"; 9. Chapter 9: "Slaughterhouse Sheep"; 10. Chapter 10: "Dreamward Road"; 11. Chapter 11: "Beam of Light"; 12. Chapter 12: "Silver Lining"; 13. Epilogue: "Dance of Autumn"
8	The Archer of Twilight; Tasogare no Shashu (黄昏の射手)	December 10, 2024; 978-4-04-915861-8	—

A collection of spin-off novels written by Kana Akatsuki is available for free on the Kakuyomu website (Kadokawa Co. & Hatena Co.). Some spin-offs from the "Dance of Spring" arc have received a manga adaptation in the spin-off Agents of the Four Seasons: One Hundred Songs and One Hundred Pages (春夏秋冬代行者 百歌百葉, Shunkashūtō Daikōsha Hyakka Hyakuyō).

=== Manga ===
A manga adaptation of the first part illustrated by Nappa Komatsuda began serialization in Hakusensha's shōjo manga magazine LaLa on July 23, 2022. Its chapters have been collected into eight tankōbon volumes as of July 2026. The manga adaptation is also licensed in English by Yen Press.

A spin-off manga illustrated by Yuriko Asami, titled Agents of the Four Seasons: One Hundred Songs and One Hundred Pages (春夏秋冬代行者 百歌百葉, Shunkashūtō Daikōsha Hyakka Hyakuyō) began serialization in the Dengeki G's Comic section of both ComicWalker and Nico Nico Seiga websites on May 15, 2023. Its chapters have been collected into three tankōbon volumes as of May 2026. The spin-off is published in English on Kadokawa's BookWalker website.

==== Agents of the Four Seasons: Dance of Spring ====
No.	Original release date	Original ISBN	English release date	English ISBN
1	January 4, 2023	978-4-592-21276-8	November 19, 2024	979-8-8554-0495-1
Chapters 1–3; Prologue
2	May 2, 2023	978-4-592-21277-5	April 22, 2025	979-8-8554-0497-5
Chapters 4–7
3	November 2, 2023	978-4-592-21278-2	August 26, 2025	979-8-8554-0499-9
Chapters 8–12; "Before Saying Farewell to Spring"
4	May 2, 2024	978-4-592-21279-9	March 24, 2026	979-8-8554-2221-4
Chapters 13–17; "Before the Fall of the Autumn Villa"
5	February 5, 2025	978-4-592-21280-5	September 22, 2026	979-8-8554-2654-0
Chapters 18–22
6	August 5, 2025	978-4-592-22281-1	April 27, 2027	979-8-8554-3599-3
7	April 3, 2026	978-4-592-22282-8	—	—
8	July 3, 2026	978-4-592-22283-5	—	—

==== Agents of the Four Seasons: One Hundred Songs and One Hundred Pages ====
No.	Release date	ISBN
1	November 10, 2023	978-4-04-915315-6
2	December 10, 2024	978-4-04-916157-1
3	May 27, 2026	978-4-04-952249-5

=== Anime ===
An anime television series adaptation of the first part was announced on April 10, 2025. It is produced by Wit Studio and directed by Ken Yamamoto, with Kazuhiro Furuhashi serving as animation adviser, Ayumu Hisao handling series composition, Namiko Torii designing the characters, and Kensuke Ushio composing the music. The series aired from March 29 to June 28, 2026, on Tokyo MX and other networks, with an advance screening held on March 15 of the same year at Shinjuku Wald 9 in Tokyo. The opening theme song is "Petals" (ペタルズ, Petaruzu), while the ending theme song is "Hana Ikada" (花筏), both performed by Orangestar featuring Kase. Crunchyroll is streaming the series in simulcast with an English dub. Muse Communication licensed the series in Southeast Asia.

==== Episodes ====
No.	Title	Directed by (Note: Production staff information is taken from the ending credits of each episode.)	Written by	Storyboarded by	Original release date (Note: Tokyo MX and BS11 listed the series premiere on March 28 at 24:00, which is effectively March 29 at midnight JST.)
1	"The Dance of Spring"; Transliteration: "Haru no Mai" (Japanese: 春の舞)	Shinnosuke Itō	Ayumu Hisao	Kazuhiro Furuhashi	March 29, 2026
The Agent of Spring, Hinagiku Kayo, and her Guard, Sakura Himedaka, head to the southern island of Ryugu in the archipelago of Yamato willing to perform the ritual of Spring Manifestation to restore their season, which has been missing for 10 years. On their journey to the shrine on Ryugu Peak, the designated location for the ritual, they encounter Nazuna, an elementary school girl who ignored the mountain's evacuation alarm. The girl explains her intention by saying she wants to "shovel the snow". The two representatives of Spring, a bit perplexed, decide to accompany the girl and help her with this strange task, deviating from their original route. They reach a grave and here, they realize that Nazuna's desire to "shovel the snow" is actually a gesture of affection towards her deceased mother. Faced with the girl's despair, Hinagiku decides to perform the Manifestation ritual. Spring thus makes its return.
2	"Lingering Snow"; Transliteration: "Nagoriyuki" (Japanese: 名残雪)	Ken Yamamoto & Sayaka Niwa	Ayumu Hisao	Ken Yamamoto	April 5, 2026
The Agent of Winter, Rosei Kantsubaki, and his Guard, Itecho Kangetsu, head to the southern island of Tsukushi to witness the return of Spring with their own eyes. Two weeks after the event in Ryugu, Hinagiku has completed her mission on this island as well. The two representatives of Winter and their escort, upon landing on the island, are attacked by a group of Rebels, but they easily repel them. Arriving at the hotel in the evening, Ishihara, a new member of the escort, asks Itecho why a meeting between the Agent of Winter and the Agent of Spring cannot take place, but the attendant responds rather superficially. The girl therefore decides to investigate on her own, consulting various documents and eventually discovering a disconcerting truth. The next day, Rosei's group sets out to witness the cherry blossoms on the island. Numerous people have flocked to Tsukushi to admire the springtime spectacle, and the resulting disturbances are not few. As the Agent of Winter contemplates the landscape, a serious accident occurs between two vehicles. A truck overturns on the road, while a car ends up on the edge of a cliff. The screams of two children are heard from the car. Rosei then decides to use his powers to save them. The intervention is successful, but the boy begins to ruminate on the past events, when he failed to protect his beloved Hinagiku. While Itechou tries to comfort him, Rosei has a vision of the girl, who shines brighter than ever.
3	"A Glimpse"; Transliteration: "Henei" (Japanese: 片影)	Miyabi Inamori & Sayaka Niwa	Ayumu Hisao	Yoshiko Sato	April 12, 2026
After completing the Spring Manifestation on Tsukushi island, Hinagiku and Sakura reach the central island of Iyo. On the advice of the Four Seasons Agency, the two girls travel to the land of Yaga, a famous touristic location where the Summer Villa, the residence of the Agent of Summer, is located, designated as a temporary residence until their assignment is complete. They are greeted by Ayame Hazakura, Guard and elder sister of the Agent of Summer, Ruri Hazakura. The attendant's warm welcome and the lively atmosphere of the villa immediately put Hinagiku and Sakura at ease, if it were not for Ruri's rudeness, who, instead of formally introducing herself, stays locked in her room, using rather brusque tones towards the Agent of Spring. The truth is that the girl is protesting against Ayame, who intends to leave her role in preparation for her wedding. The news shocks the two representatives of Spring, but it doesn't distract them from their task. After a series of Manifestations on the island, Hinagiku falls ill due to excessive use of the Divine Powers. Sakura decides to prepare something to restore her strength and meets Ayame in the villa's kitchen, with whom she begins a reflection on what a Guard is to an Agent. Sakura's words reassure Ayame, who has a different aura than the first time they met. A few hours later, Hinagiku wakes up without fever and decides to tell her attendant, but something sinister looms over the villa.
4	"Morning Calm"; Transliteration: "Asakaze" (Japanese: 朝風)	Hayate Sato	Ayumu Hisao & Tomomi Kawaguchi	Hayate Sato	April 19, 2026
A group of Rebels attacks and breaks into the Summer Villa, aiming to capture Hinagiku and Ruri. While a series of firefights erupt on the ground floor, Sakura and Ayame face armed men alone on the upper floor. The two guards manage to fend off the attack, and the situation calms down in the other rooms of the villa. However, Sakura is informed of the presence of some members of the Winter Village's elite escort, sent by Rosei and Itecho to protect the two girls during their journey. This news irritates Sakura, but she decides to take advantage of it for Hinagiku's safety. Everyone gathers in the living room to discuss the situation. The two Spring representatives are joined by the Summer sisters, but the scene is surreal: Ruri and Ayame are actually twins. The atmosphere between the two is tense, and even in such a context, the Agent of Summer takes every opportunity to show her irritation to her sister. Meanwhile, Sakura realizes that the girl she spoke to in the kitchen was actually Ruri, posing as Ayame, who confesses she did it to secretly meet the Spring attendant. Hinagiku intervenes, scolding her colleague, then shifts the conversation to her protesting attitude. As the two Agents converse, bittersweet memories from the past resurface in Sakura's mind.
5	"Alone Together"; Transliteration: "Futaribotchi" (Japanese: 二人ぼっち)	Shinnosuke Itō	Ayumu Hisao	Shinnosuke Itō	April 26, 2026
Having completed their mission on Iyo Island, Hinagiku and Sakura travel to the northern island of Teishuu, home to the capital Teito and their birthplace, the Village of Spring. The Agent of Spring, recognizing the region's spiritual lineage, begins to recall some events from her childhood. The narrative context of these memories is introduced through a dialogue between Rousei and Itechou, who have returned to the Winter Villa, deeply perplexed by the decision of the Spring Division of the Four Seasons Authority not to reinforce the two girls' security detail after the attack on the Summer Villa. This decision has something to do with Hinagiku's past. She is the daughter of the previous Agent of Spring, Koubai Yukiyanagi, and the current head of the Kayou family, Shungetsu, the product of an illegitimate relationship between the two. When the news became public within the village, much unrest ensued, including the attempted murder of Koubai and the still-infant Hinagiku at the hands of his legitimate wife. The woman and the child moved to their maternal grandmother's house to escape the slums. Unfortunately, her grandmother passed away, and Koubai's health deteriorated due to illness, forcing them to return. On that day, the Agent of Spring asked Shungetsu to guard Hinagiku, hoping that by separating from her, he could live a better life. But the gods proved cruel: when Koubai lost his life, Hinagiku was chosen as the new Agent of Spring, an unprecedented mother-daughter transition that was seen by the villagers as a harbinger of doom. For this reason, many rumors began to spread about the child, one of which reached the ears of Sakura, then an elementary school student. Intrigued by what she heard, she decided to sneak into the new Agent's hideout to verify its veracity, only to be discovered by Hinagiku herself. This strange encounter would mark the beginning of a deep bond that would bind them together for life.
6	"A Place to Call Home"; Transliteration: "Kaeru Basho" (Japanese: 還る場所)	Miho Arai	Ayumu Hisao & Tomomi Kawaguchi	Miho Arai	May 3, 2026
Hinagiku and Sakura continue to manifest Spring on Teishuu Island. After completing a series of rituals, the two girls decide to rest on the shores of a lake to recharge. During this moment of relaxation, Hinagiku notices the snow melting on the local mountains and becomes saddened, wondering how Rousei feels. Although the girl defines herself as a different person from the child she was before being kidnapped, whom she believes to be dead, she continues to harbor feelings for the Agent of Winter. This irritates Sakura, who immaturely desires all of Hinagiku's love for herself. In a moment of intimacy with her Lady, the attendant begins to remember the pain she had to live with in the past. Hinagiku notices her Bodyguard's moment of difficulty and lavishes her undivided affection upon her. A moment of intimacy between two girls bound by fate, whose love defies definition.
7	"Dusk"; Transliteration: "Yoyami" (Japanese: 宵聞)	Hajime Nihira	Ayumu Hisao	Hajime Nihira	May 10, 2026
The Agent of Autumn, Nadeshiko Iwaizuki, enjoys admiring and drawing the spring landscape brought by Hinagiku to Tsukushi Island, home to the Autumn Mansion. This is little Nadeshiko's first spring, and she's truly thrilled—an enthusiasm she can't help but share with her Guard, Rindo Azami. Although the orderly seems to treat his job like a business and can't wait to be alone for a cigarette, he's actually overprotective of his young lady, so much so that he's touched when the little girl shares her excitement at discovering she shares the name of a flower with Hinagiku. The brief but loving exchange between the two comes to an end when Rindo is called back to the mansion's security department to sign some documents relating to the Council of the Four Seasons. Meanwhile, the two Spring girls are shopping for souvenirs at a Teishuu airport shop, ready to head to Enishi Island to give to the two Winter representatives. Meanwhile, Rosei and Itecho are pondering the Insurgents' movements, too strange to be autonomous, and suspect there are moles in Yamato's institutions. The two young men's priority is to ensure maximum safety for Hinagiku and Sakura during the demonstration in Enishi. Although they both believe they don't deserve to see the two girls again after the event ten years ago, they burn with desire to see them again, and now more than ever they feel they can succeed. While each of them reflects on their feelings, at the Autumn Villa, Rindo finishes reading the documents and prepares to return to Nadeshiko, a routine no different from the ordinary days he's accustomed to. However, this monotony is about to be shattered, as a great misfortune falls upon the villa like a bomb from the sky.
8	"Spring Rain"; Transliteration: "Sakura-ame" (Japanese: 桜雨)	Akihito Sudo	Tomomi Kawaguchi	Akihito Sudo	May 17, 2026
icon
9	"United Front"; Transliteration: "Kyōdō sensen" (Japanese: 共同戦線)	Miho Arai	Ayumu Hisao	Takuji Miyamoto	May 24, 2026
10	"Afterimage"; Transliteration: "Zanzō" (Japanese: 残像)	Yūtarō Kubo & Satomi Maiya	Ayumu Hisao	Yūtarō Kubo & Satomi Maiya	May 31, 2026
icon
11	"Impatience"; Transliteration: "Shōsō" (Japanese: 焦燥)	Wazuka Komamiya	Tomomi Kawaguchi	Wazuka Komamiya	June 7, 2026
icon
12	"Assault"; Transliteration: "Shūrai" (Japanese: 襲来)	Sayaka Niwa, Tsumori Shindo, Ryuho Nogi, Zhu Xiaoyue & Wang Xiao	Ayumu Hisao	Sayaka Niwa	June 14, 2026
icon
13	"Recapture"; Transliteration: "Dakkan" (Japanese: 奪還)	Yoshiyuki Kumeda, Yuichi Shimodaira & Yuta Mikami	Tomomi Kawaguchi	Shinzaburō Egawa	June 21, 2026
icon
14	"Spring Flowers Bloom in Winter"; Transliteration: "Fuyuni Saku Haru no Hana" (Japanese: 冬に咲く春の花)	Ken Yamamoto, Shinnosuke Itō, Miyabi Inamori & Hideyuki Satake	Ayumu Hisao	Naoto Hosoda & Hideyuki Satake	June 28, 2026
icon

== Reception ==
The series topped the New Title category of the 2022 edition of Takarajimasha's Kono Light Novel ga Sugoi! guidebook.

By March 2026, the series had over 850,000 copies in circulation.

== See also ==
- Violet Evergarden, another light novel series by Kana Akatsuki
