= Faster than a Kiss =

Japanese manga series

- The cover of the first Kisu Yori mo Hayaku volume as published by Hakusensha in Japan on July 5, 2007. Art by Meca Tanaka.

キスよりも早く (Kisu yori mo Hayaku)
- Genre: Drama, Romantic comedy, Slice of life
- Manga
- Written by: Meca Tanaka
- Published by: Hakusensha
- Magazine: LaLa
- Original run: March 2007 – October 2012
- Volumes: 12

Faster than a Kiss (キスよりも早く, Kisu yori mo Hayaku) is a shōjo manga series written and illustrated by Meca Tanaka. The series has been serialized in Hakusensha's monthly shōjo manga magazine, LaLa since March 2007. The series concluded in October 2012 with twelve volumes published.

== Plot ==
Fumino and her 4-year-old brother Teppei have lived with relatives since their parents died in a car accident. Tired of moving from a relative's house to another, she decides to drop out of school and find work to support her brother on her own. As they sit on a park bench, her English teacher, Kazuma Ojiro appears in front of her and her brother. He tries to convince her to go back to school. She jokingly asks him to marry her in order to support her and Teppei, and he agrees. Now Fumino and Kazuma live together in Kazuma's apartment. In school the two keep their marriage a secret from others. This creates some drama in the storyline. The series is mainly about how Fumino and Kazuma's relationship slowly buds.

== Characters ==
=== Main characters ===
Fumino Kaji (梶 文乃, Kaji Fumino)
Voiced by: Saeko Chiba
Fumino is a 16-year-old girl who is described as a delinquent in Kumaneko High School, although she is not, and simply tries to stand up for others against bullies. She is a beautiful girl with a strong personality and sometimes loses her temper, but is really very caring when it comes to those she loves, such as her brother Teppei. Her parents died in a car accident and so she had to become responsible for her little brother. As a result, she has become more mature and practical than others her age. However, she is terrible at cooking, so she relies on Kazuma to cook for her and her brother. Even so, she cooked some porridge with some spring onions for Kazuma when he had a high fever. While nursing him with a mask on, he told her that when he was ill, nobody went near him, so they wouldn't get sick too. He also kissed Fumino through the mask, though when he got well, he doesn't remember what he had done.
She once secretly worked in one of Retsu's construction buildings for two weeks (cleaning floors) in order to earn some money to buy Kazuma a birthday present. She bought him a green necktie. According to chapter 17, Fumino did nothing but sleep in class for the 1st year of school, which causes other students to see her as a bad student. Now she does well in her studies, only slightly poor in English. Ironically enough, it is later revealed that she can quite accurately understand English in conversation, which eventually causes her to start considering studying the language more seriously. Kazuma calls her "Fumino-san". He's very protective of Fumino and doesn't like when other men get too close to her. Fumino loves Kazuma very much.

Kazuma Ojiro (尾白一馬, Ojiro Kazuma)
Voiced by: Kōji Yusa
A 24-year-old English teacher who teaches at Kumaneko High School, Kazuma is described as a "plain, glasses-wearing English teacher." Kazuma is the only one who looked for Fumino when she ran away and ended up marrying her, supposedly only to help her and Teppei. He is sometimes goofy and says he appreciates seeing Fumino's rare smile. He asks Fumino to help him with problematic students because of her strong personality, although he is a teacher and that isn't her responsibility. He has a calm and caring demeanor, and cares for young Teppei more than Fumino does (according to her). He often gives Teppei candy for his hard work or just for being cute. Kazuma cooks for the family and usually sleeps much later than the rest of his family because of his dedication to teaching. Kazuma has numerous costumes for both Teppei and Fumino to wear, and often dresses them up for cosplay. Even though they are married, Fumino and Kazuma sleep separately. He occasionally sleeps in Fumino's room, but only next to Teppei. Kazuma isn't open about his past, but later in the story, it is revealed that Kazuma was once in a gang. According to his old "gang" friends, he was called Jigoku no Mā-kun (地獄のまーくん; Mā-kun from Hell) because he beat up 100 motorcycle gang members without getting a single scratch.
He still has formidable fighting abilities; shown when he beat up two guys with one hand, while with his other hand he was holding Fumino. He sadly mentions once that his family is still alive, only that they reject him because of his delinquent past. His mother has died, and His father is a politician as revealed by Shōma. According to Shōma, Kazuma was an excellent student, as expected from a person set to become the successor of his father. One day, however, he suddenly turned into a delinquent and left home. It is mentioned that Kazuma was not close to his family to begin with, especially after his father's second marriage.

At first, Kazuma holds no romantic feelings for Fumino. He marries her out of sympathy for her and Teppei, and he feels strongly that he shouldn't be "touching" her in case she leaves him for another man; which he would respect if she did. He slowly falls in love with her throughout the series, and only his decision to wait until she has graduated high school prevents him from touching her. He is extremely protective and possessive of Fumino.
Teppei Kaji (梶 鉄兵, Kaji Teppei)
Voiced by: Miyuki Sawashiro
Teppei is the 4-year-old little brother of Fumino. Teppei's personality is bright; he often makes people around him happy. Both Fumino and Kazuma love him. Teppei views Kazuma as a brother or a father figure. Kazuma often gives Teppei candy for his hard work, or just simply for being cute. Though still very young, he often tries to defend his sister when anyone bullies her. This is shown when Shōma was criticizing her; Teppei defends her by punching him in the leg and saying, "Shō-chan, you bullied Bun-chan/Buncha" with his fists balled up in anger.
When Fumino and Teppei leave Kazuma, Teppei leaves a trail of his collected hard candy for Kazuma to follow. He was also the one who tried to convince Fumino to stay with Kazuma when she tried to leave, which causes enough distraction for Kazuma to catch up with them. He loves living with Kazuma. He gave his first drawing to Kazuma as a birthday present. It was a picture of Kazuma himself. Teppei goes to school with his kindergarten teacher Ryū, who is Kazuma's best friend and neighbor. Teppei nicknames Fumino "Bun-chan" or "Buncha" (ブンちや) and Kazuma "Mā-kun".

=== Secondary characters ===
Ryūu Shindō (進藤 龍, Shindō Ryū)
He is a happy-go-lucky guy who is Kazuma's best friend as well as his neighbor. He is also Teppei's kindergarten teacher and is one of the few people who know about Kazuma and Fumino's marriage. Ryū takes care of Teppei a great deal (while Kazuma and Fumino are being lovey-dovey), and also poses as Fumino's distant relation and guardian, which is their official lie to conceal the relationship between the two. He also tells Fumino about Kazuma's past. In one chapter, Ryū shows Fumino a picture of Kazuma and himself back in high school. Kazuma's face looks dark and demonic in the picture and he had long hair with insane demonic eyes. He added that Kazuma beat up the cameraman after taking the picture. Ryū also helps Fumino dress sexy for Kazuma. How he managed to have women's lingerie is a mystery but it was revealed that he previously worked as a host in a club.
Ken Kurosawa (黒沢 健, Kurosawa Ken)
He is one of Fumino's classmates and has a crush on her. Although Ken doesn't know that Kazuma and Fumino are married, he originally sees them together hugging, when Kazuma was telling Fumino that her life was more important than their marriage ring. He later walks in on them right when they were about to kiss after Kazuma had whisked Fumino away into a classroom to watch the festival's fireworks together. Also, when he confessed his love to Fumino, Kazuma steps in.
Retsu
The third generation of the Higuma Gang, Retsu is Kazuma's old friend. He gave Kazuma pudding as an apology for his men because they kidnapped Fumino without realizing that she is Kazuma's wife. When he invites Fumino to his home so that he can apologize again, he tells her that she is stupid for believing that he is a good person. Kazuma then busts into the scene, kicking Retsu in the face and causing his nose to bleed. It is revealed he was just joking around with Fumino and is actually a nice person. He is known as "The Pudding Person".
Shōma Ojiro (尾白翔馬, Ojiro Shōma)
Shōma is Kazuma's younger brother. He's also a student at Kumaneko High School. He's very popular among the girls at school. Though due to his cold and rude attitude, they call him "Ice Prince". Shōma originally didn't believe that Fumino is a girl. He finally believes it after seeing her underwear. He once tried to bribe or supposedly give Fumino money to live comfortably until she graduates, in exchange for leaving Kazuma. However, she smacks it away and called him an idiot for thinking that she will leave him for money. Despite being brothers, Shōma and Kazuma have different mothers, but they do talk to each other in polite terms. Since Kazuma had left the family, Shōma had to take over his responsibilities. He also insults Kazuma for becoming a teacher, claiming it's below his social status.
Apparently, he doesn't know when Kazuma's birthday is, which shocked Fumino. He goes on to tell her that it isn't celebrated in the Ojiro household. While Shōma is supposedly dating Meg, he is confronted by Meg to have feelings for Fumino. He had denied it, however. But as of chapter 35, Shōuma is seen kissing Fumino while she was asleep, as shown from Meg and Teppei's point of view. He had even taunted his brother that he and [Kazuma]'s princess (aka, Fumino) had spent the whole day together afterwards. However, in Chapter 37, he revealed that he didn't kiss Fumino in the first place and was actually playing a prank on them. He loves his brother very dearly although he doesn't really like to show it. As of Chapter 46, Shouma admitted to his brother, Kazuma, that he likes Fumino.

Margaret Denton
Margaret or simply Meg, is one of the students of Kumaneko High School. She's 17 years old. She recently transferred there from overseas. She is the daughter of a hotel mogul. She also constantly hitting on Kazuma. It is implied that she was only doing so because she wanted to make Shōma jealous or show a reaction. She was "bullying" Fumino when she first arrived, but eventually became friends with her. She gives Fumino a makeover for a date with Kazuma At the end of chapter 19, she told Shōma that she would be leaving for America to marry someone that her father chose for her, but she didn't want that because she was really in love with him (Shōma). So she stayed in Japan with him. Even though she is supposedly dating Shōma, but had confronted him in chapter 35 for having feelings for Fumino. Later, on a study session in library with Fumino and Shōma, Meg witnessed Shōma kissing Fumino.
Kaji Tomoyuki
Appeared in chapter 22, Tomoyuki made his first appearance through a voice message in his father's answering machine. He indicated in his message that he wishes to take care of Fumino and Teppei since his work has become less busy. It is revealed in chapter 23 that he is the younger brother of Fumino and Teppei's father, and is therefore Fumino's uncle. He wanted to take away Fumino and Teppei from Kazuma so that the secret of their marriage will not be revealed. Tomoyuki forces Fumino and Teppei to leave Kazuma's apartment and live with him. He believes that Fumino and Kazuma will grow apart since they won't be seeing each other as often. He is relatively short for a guy and has a slim build, and he's extremely baby-faced; He looks as if he's still in high school even though he is 28 years old. Fumino has stated that she has spent time with him since she was a little girl, and in all the time that she's known him, his face hasn't changed. Despite his appearance, he is very strong, and is something of a legendary Judo practitioner.
Fumino's grandfather
He is Fumino's grandfather from her father's side of the family. He had cut off all ties with Fumino at the funeral of her parents but made up with her in Chapter 22. Seems to be attached to Teppei and gives him many presents.
Soraki Tomoe
Soraki Tomoe is Tomoyuki's student who he taught overseas, Tomoe has a crush on Tomoyuki and wishes to become his wife. Tomoyuki made a promise to her in the past saying that if she managed to pin him on his back by any means, then he would marry her. Although Tomoyuki meant this as a joke and didn't take it seriously, Tomoe took the challenge very seriously and has since attempted to floor Tomoyuki many times in order to become his bride. However Tomoyuki only sees her as his important student. She, like Tomoyuki, is baby-faced and is revealed to actually be 18 years old despite looking younger than 16 year-old Fumino. She first appears in chapter 25.
Takusu-san
The Takusu family patriarch, Takusu once worked for the Ojiro family as a secretary. When he retired, he passed that position on to his son. While Kazuma was still in kindergarten, Takusu was given Kazuma to raise and care for while the Ojiro family head wooed and married a new wife. Kazuma stayed with the Takusu family for four years. During that time, Kazuma experienced a family dynamic for the first time. The Takusu family were the first to teach Kazuma things like manners and gratitude. After the four years, Kazuma had come to see Takusu-san as more of a father than his biological one. When Takusu fell ill many years later, Kazuma visits him the hospital and finally admits that he considered Takusu-san more of a father than Ojiro-san. This occurs in chapter 44.
Akio Takusu
The son of Takusu-san, he has taken over his father's position as a secretary in the Ojiro family household. When he was younger, he treated Kazuma like a brother in that he teased and constantly looked after him. As an adult, he still works for the Ojiro's but still maintains a caring if stressed friendship with Kazuma. In chapter 43, he gives Kazuma a letter encouraging Kazuma to see Takusu-san when Takusu-san took ill.

== Media ==
=== Manga ===
Written and illustrated by Meca Tanaka, the chapters of Faster than a Kiss appear as a serial in the Japanese manga magazine LaLa and are collected into tankōbon by Hakusensha. As of October 2012, the series has twelve volumes. The manga is complete with a total of 57 chapters.

=== Volume list ===
No.	Japanese release date	Japanese ISBN
01	July 5, 2007	978-4-592-18471-3
02	December 5, 2007	978-4-592-18472-0
03	May 2, 2008	978-4-592-18473-7
04	December 5, 2008	978-4-592-18474-4
05	June 5, 2009	978-4-592-18475-1
06	November 5, 2009	978-4-592-18476-8
07	April 30, 2010	978-4-592-18477-5
08	December 3, 2010	978-4-592-18478-2
09	July 5, 2011	978-4-592-18479-9
10	December 5, 2011	978-4-592-19340-1
11	June 5, 2012	978-4-592-19341-8
12	October 5, 2012	978-4-592-19342-5

=== Drama CD ===
A drama CD of Faster than a Kiss was included in the May 2008 and November 2009 issues of LaLa.

== Reception ==
The third volume ranked seventh on the list of best-selling Japanese comics for May 6–12, 2008. For the weeks of December 3–15, 2008, the fourth volume placed tenth on the list with an estimated 56,073 copies sold weekly and 125,759 total copies sold. The fifth volume stayed at the tenth place for the weeks of June 1–14, 2009, selling an estimated 54,048 copies a week for total of 125,166 copies sold. The sixth volume ranked ninth on the list for the week of November 2–8 and 9–15, 2009 before dropping to tenth place with 36,878 copies sold weekly, totaling 121,326 copies sold.
