= The Secret Notes of Lady Kanoko =

Shōjo manga written and illustrated by Ririko Tsujita

- The cover of the first volume of The Secret Notes of Lady Kanoko

笑うかのこ様 (Warau Kanoko-sama)
- Manga
- Written by: Ririko Tsujita
- Published by: Hakusensha
- English publisher: Tokyopop (former)
- Magazine: LaLa
- Original run: July 10, 2007 – June 10, 2009
- Volumes: 3
- Manga

Koi Dano Ai Dano
- Written by: Ririko Tsujita
- Published by: Hakusensha
- Magazine: LaLa
- Original run: October 10, 2009 – May, 2016
- Volumes: 11
- Manga

Koi Dano Ai Dano ~Kimi wa Boku no Taiyō da~
- Written by: Ririko Tsujita
- Published by: Hakusensha
- Magazine: LaLa
- Original run: November 24, 2023 – March 24, 2025
- Volumes: 3

The Secret Notes of Lady Kanoko (笑うかのこ様, Warau Kanoko-sama; lit. "Smiling Lady Kanoko") is a shōjo manga written and illustrated by Ririko Tsujita. The series spanned 14 chapters that in three tankōbon volumes. A sequel manga, Koi Dano Ai Dano, was serialized from 2009 to 2016. Another sequel manga, Koi Dano Ai Dano ~Kimi wa Boku no Taiyō da~ was serialized from November 2023 to March 2025. It was licensed for English release by Tokyopop but was dropped after 2 volumes due to Tokypop's bankruptcy.

== Plot ==
Kanoko Naedoko is a third year middle school student who likes to be alone and keeps to herself. She watches her classmates from the sidelines, and is what she calls herself an "observer". Steamy love triangles, school gossip and courtyard politics only mean more data for Kanoko! But when she befriends some of her classmates, what will happen to Kanoko? Will she become more than just an observer?

== Characters ==
Kanoko Naedoko (苗床 かのこ, Naedoko Kanoko)
The main character of the series. Kanoko prefers to be alone and enjoys being the 'class observer', writing down all her observations in a notebook. She has a very straightforward personality, telling people exactly whats on her mind whether it upsets them or not. She's a very strong character who doesn't give into bully, even deriving amusement from it. She is adept at reading people and interpreting their motives, but only when it relates to other people. If it is in relation to herself, she is not nearly as accurate due to her fixed perception of her own identity. For example, she will assume that no one would harbor any romantic interest in her. In spite of her assertion that she is a loner and strictly an observer, she embroils herself in much of what happens at her schools, directing events for her own amusement, even going so far as to become friends with three of the most popular kids in her first school. That said, she is not a malicious person and the results are typically beneficial for those involved. As of late, it has been hinted that Tsubaki harbors feelings for Kanoko, but Kanoko herself is not aware of it for she is positive nobody could ever harbor feelings for her. Even though she looks plain, Tsubaki and Yabuki were attracted to her. She soon realized her feelings for Tsubaki and enters a relationship with him. At the end of manga, it's been implied she marries Tsubaki and has a child with him.
Haru Tsubaki (椿 初流, Tsubaki Haru)
A classmate at Kanoko's (99th) previous school. He is the most popular boy in the class in spite (or because) of his aloof personality. He paid Kanako little attention until she approached him under fabricated pretenses. Her response to his rejection was very unexpected and had developed such an interest in her unique personality that he visits her at every new school she goes to (under equally fabricated or weak pretenses) and helps her when she needs help in whatever the circumstance is. He develops romantic feelings for her, but she misinterprets this as strong platonic friendship.
Momoka Hanai (花井 桃香, Hanai Momoka)
Also known as "Momo". She is simple-minded, cheerful and easygoing and the most popular girl in her school. She is also bullied by the other girls who are nice to her in person but are jealous of her popularity with boys. She has a crush on Tsubaki and initially talks to Kanoko because she was the only one Tsubaki showed any interest in. Unlike the other girls, Kanoko is blunt and honest to the point of rude. She takes her criticism to heart and continues to interact with her. After Kanoko witnesses the bullying and defends Momoka (in her own unique way), Momoka's affection for Kanoko becomes greater than her affection for Tsubaki. Likewise, Kanoko realizes that Momoka has no ulterior motive for friendship and considers Momoka her best friend. Although Momoka initially harbored feelings for Tsubaki, it seems that she treasures her friendship with Kanoko much more although it is not certain if she still harbors feelings for Tsubaki.
Touta Natsukusa (夏草 透太, Natsukusa Tōta)
A friend of Kanoko, Momoka and Tsubaki. He's friendly and outgoing and is the second most popular guy in the school. He has a crush on Momoka, but is too shy to admit his feelings. He is almost the opposite of Kanoko, oblivious to people's motives and true feelings due to his own naivety. He takes things at face value, something that annoys Tsubaki, so Tsubaki annoys him in turn by flirting with Momoka. He is the catalyst to Tsubaki and Momoka's friendship with Kanoko. He helped her pick up her observation notebook and happened to see the contents. He accepted her hasty and poorly thought out explanation without question, which led to Kanoko trying to dissect his personality, which in turn led her talking to Tsubaki so she could compare personalities.
Marine Suitenguu (水天宮 鞠音, Suitengū Marine)
Classmate at Kanoko's 100th middle school. Marine pretends to be a humble and sweet girl, but the truth, she is derisive and manipulative. She pretended to be Kanoko's friend when her loner tendencies caused problems for the teacher, but they came to a mutual agreement when Kanoko revealed that she knew her true personality already. She was later betrayed by said teacher and when Kanoko sabotaged him (albeit for her own reasons), she regarded Kanoko as a real friend.
Sachiko Kinokodani (茸谷 幸子, Kinokodani Sachiko)
Classmate at Kanoko's 101st middle school. She had a crush on the student council president and secretly left helpful notes and refreshment for him, but one of the more popular girls claimed she did it and the two began dating. Sachiko was incensed by this and wrote out a revenge plan in her notebook. After Kanoko transferred in, they swapped notebooks by accident and Sachiko attempted to blackmail Kanoko into helping her. Though she was not at all swayed by the threat, she was overpowered by her desire to observe the results. While they are ultimately successful, Sachiko finds the results aren't completely palatable and goes to Kanoko for help. However, Kanoko refuses to do so, knowing that this would happen and only participated to enjoy the show.
Mitsue Aida (愛田 三枝, Aida Mitsue)
One of the people Kanoko meets at her 102nd middle school. She is upbeat and considers herself an "art genius", but in truth is self-absorbed and desires attention more than artistic expression. Ultimately, this alienates her from the rest of her class. Rather than becoming depressed, she insists that she and Kanoko should be friends, due to the fact that no one could understand her lonely perception of the world better than the "tortured art genius". Though Kanoko finds her obnoxious, her desire to observe her wins out.
Kyoko Shinonome (東雲 今日子, Shinonome Kyoko)
Kyoko first appeared in Koi Dano Ai Dano. She is a member of the Newspaper Club. She met Kanoko when Kanoko accidentally fell in a hole she made to catch a Tsuchinoko. Kanoko helps her club out of getting disbanded.
Kaede Yabuki (矢吹 楓, Yabuki Kaede)
Kaede first appeared in Koi Dano Ai Dano. She is The younger sister Of Yabuki You, Who is the student council president. She is a part of the Student Council and the Musical Club.
You Yabuki (矢吹 洋, Yabuki You)
He is kaede's older brother and is in the student Council with his Sister. He Often argues with his over a lot of things, like how He promised Kaede that he would not disband the Newspaper club if they make a big scoop and he said I might have said that and she yelled at him.
