= The Dark History of the Reincarnated Villainess =

Japanese manga series

- First tankōbon volume cover

転生悪女の黒歴史 (Tensei Akujo no Kuro Rekishi)
- Genre: Romantic comedy; Isekai
- Manga
- Written by: Akiharu Tōka
- Published by: Hakusensha
- English publisher: NA: Yen Press
- Imprint: Hana to Yume Comics
- Magazine: LaLa
- Original run: August 24, 2018 – present
- Volumes: 19 + 2 short story collections
- Anime television series
- Directed by: Hiroaki Sakurai
- Written by: Mitsutaka Hirota
- Music by: Ryūichi Takada
- Studio: Studio Deen
- Licensed by: Crunchyroll
- Original network: TV Tokyo, TVO, BS11, AT-X
- Original run: October 9, 2025 – December 25, 2025
- Episodes: 13
- icon

The Dark History of the Reincarnated Villainess (転生悪女の黒歴史, Tensei Akujo no Kuro Rekishi) is a Japanese manga series written and illustrated by Akiharu Tōka. It began serialization in Hakusensha's shōjo manga magazine LaLa in August 2018. An anime television series adaptation produced by Studio Deen aired from October to December 2025.

== Premise ==
An office worker named Konoha Satou is killed by a truck and reincarnated in a world based on The Dark History, a self-insert fantasy novel which she wrote during her teenage years. Having written the main character as her Mary Sue self insert when young, in a twist, adult Konoha is instead reincarnated as the prologue villain of the story: the main character's evil sister, Iana Magnolia. Knowing that in the original story, she wrote Iana being killed after trying to murder her elder sister, she becomes desperate to avoid dying, doing everything in her power to ensure the safety of her sister. Having to convince others that she's not evil anymore, having to face her old teenage writings that she finds cringeworthy now, and making friends with her own characters along the way, Iana needs to remember the plot details of her own once forgotten self-fiction, in order to save her sister, friends, and herself from the many events they face throughout their adventures.

== Characters ==
Iana Magnolia (イアナ・マグノリア, Iana Magunoria) / Konoha Satou (佐藤コノハ, Satō Konoha)
Voiced by: Sumire Uesaka (voice drama), Yoshino Aoyama (anime) (Japanese); Kelsey Cruz (English)
A Japanese office worker who was killed by a passing truck and reborn in a world based on her childhood novel, but as the wicked sister of the story's main character. In the original plot, she was meant to be executed. Not wanting to die a second time, she becomes determined to protect both herself and Konoha using her knowledge of the plot, but her actions begin to change the story. Even so, the story still attempts to undo her changes.
Konoha Magnolia (コノハ・マグノリア, Konoha Magunoria)
Voiced by: M.A.O (anime) (Japanese); Luci Christian (English)
Iana's elder sister, who could use magical abilities and is named after Iana's original incarnation. She was targeted for assassination by her sister in the original storyline. In the altered storyline, she doesn't discover her powers, which leaves her unable to fight, and Iana wishes to protect her rather than kill her. She loves her sister despite knowing of her misdeeds.
Sol Nemophila (ソル・ネモフィラ, Soru Nemofira)
Voiced by: Hiroshi Kamiya (voice drama), Shōhei Komatsu (anime) (Japanese); Blake McNamara, Sarah Roach (young) (English)
A butler who was meant to kill Iana in the previous storyline. In the alternate storyline, he instead falls in love with her and is desperate to keep her safe. He and Yomi are bitter rivals.
Ginoford Dandelion (ギノフォード・ダンデライオン, Ginofōdo Danderaion)
Voiced by: Makoto Furukawa (anime) (Japanese); David Matranga (English)
Konoha's fiancé. He is very hostile towards Iana at first, but soon begins to treat her as a lover after she saves Konoha.
Yomi Blacksarena (ヨミ・ブラックサレナ, Yomi Burakkusarena)
Voiced by: Yoshitsugu Matsuoka (voice drama), Shun'ichi Toki (anime)
A charming villain who previously worked with Iana to kill Konoha. He became like this due to his unpleasant childhood. Confused by Iana's personality change, he attempts to turn Iana back to her evil self, but is nevertheless supportive of her. He also has feelings for Iana and a love rivalry with Sol.
Cheneau Clematis (シャノウ・クレマチス, Shanou Kuremachisu)
Voiced by: Arthur Lounsbery (anime) (Japanese); Ben Stegmair (English)
The Vice Captain of the Hydrangea Security Force. He hates Iana due to her villainous nature, having also arrested her in the past. He still holds his grudge despite her personality change, mostly because he thinks Iana is responsible for the disappearance of his sister. After discovering Amaryllis's true colors and that it was she who kidnapped his sister, he appears to have let go of his grudge upon learning of Iana's innocence.
Mika (ミカ)
Voiced by: Atsushi Tamaru (anime)
A member of the Hydrangea Security Force, often shows up with Cheneau Clematis.
Yamato Hydrangea (ヤマト・ハイランドジア, Yamato Hairandojia)
Voiced by: Tomoaki Maeno (anime)
The captain of the Hydrangea Security Force.
Kagura Ivy/Agni (カグラ・アイビー, Kagura Aibī)
Voiced by: Daiki Kobayashi
A young elf who is a friend of Shukuna's. His innocent nature hides his true wicked personality. It is later revealed that he is a member of a dark organization called Schwartz Le Chevalier, who seeks to awaken Konoha's powers for their own gain. He also manipulated Amaryllis and the Vampire Lord to complete his goal; it is implied that he was also manipulating Iana when she was a villainess in the first place. His real name is Agni.
Shukuna (シュクナ)
Voiced by: Kentarō Kumagai
An elf who is a friend of Kagura's, but he doesn't know of Kagura's true colors. He was meant to be killed in the original storyline. In the alternate storyline, he willingly becomes a vampire and now serves the Vampire Lord. After the Vampire Lord's defeat, he returns to normal.
Vampire Lord (吸血鬼王, Kyūketsuki Ō)
Voiced by: Tomokazu Sugita
A powerful vampire who once attacked the elf village, but was imprisoned. He is eventually freed by Kagura and now targets Konoha and Iana. In the end, he is killed by Iana.
Count Magnolia
Iana and Konoha's father.
Suselina Amaryllis
A duchess and the king's sister. She is actually a psychopath who kidnaps young women, kills them, and drinks their blood to maintain her beauty due to a promise that she made to her sister following her death. After being defeated and arrested by the Hydrangea Unit with the help of Konoha, she commits suicide; Iana unsuccessfully tried to prevent this.
Menoa Camellia
Younger half-sister of a noble. She doesn't seem to know of Iana's past villainy, and Iana ends up befriending her. She was captured by Amaryllis, but Iana and her allies rescue her.
Caelum
A member of the mysterious Schwartz Le Chevalier. He is presumably the leader.
Ventus
A member of the mysterious Schwartz Le Chevalier.
Yatori
A doctor who works for Ginoford.
Augnieth
Sol's childhood friend, who is also an assassin.

== Media ==
=== Manga ===
Written and illustrated by Akiharu Tōka, The Dark History of the Reincarnated Villainess began serialization in Hakusensha's shōjo manga magazine LaLa on August 24, 2018. Its chapters have been compiled into nineteen tankōbon volumes and two short story volumes as of August 2026. The series is licensed by Yen Press for English publication.

No.	Original release date	Original ISBN	North American release date	North American ISBN
1	January 4, 2019	978-4-592-21174-7	January 19, 2021	978-1-9753-2030-0
Death Flags 1–3; The High School Necromancer Black Cloak; Bonus
2	July 5, 2019	978-4-592-21175-4	April 20, 2021	978-1-9753-2050-8
Death Flags 4–7; Bonus
3	January 4, 2020	978-4-592-22023-7	August 10, 2021	978-1-9753-2052-2
Death Flags 8–12; Bonus
4	July 3, 2020	978-4-592-22024-4	January 25, 2022	978-1-9753-3734-6
Death Flags 13–17; Bonus
5	December 4, 2020	978-4-592-22025-1	May 24, 2022	978-1-9753-3753-7
Death Flags 18–22; Bonus
6	April 30, 2021	978-4-592-22056-5; 978-4-592-22794-6 (SE)	November 22, 2022	978-1-9753-4143-5
Death Flags 23–27; Bonus
7	November 5, 2021	978-4-592-22057-2; 978-4-592-22824-0 (SE)	May 23, 2023	978-1-9753-6227-0
Death Flags 27.5–32; Bonus
8	March 4, 2022	978-4-592-22058-9; 978-4-592-22825-7 (SE)	October 24, 2023	978-1-9753-6229-4
Death Flags 33–37; Bonus; Bonus: "The Marriage of Iana and Iazo"
9	September 5, 2022	978-4-592-22059-6	February 20, 2024	978-1-9753-8781-5
Death Flags 38–42; Bonus
Ex	September 5, 2022	978-4-592-22226-2	August 27, 2024	978-1-9753-9165-2
1. "Officer Cheneau's Days of Torture"; 2. "Yomi, Jealousy, and Happy Birthdays"; 3. "A Mad Case of Butler Fever"; 4. "I Drag Sol and Yomi to the Yuri Academy"; 5. "Isaac and Iana's Secret Date"
10	January 4, 2023	978-4-592-22060-2	June 18, 2024	978-1-9753-9163-8
Death Flags 43–47; Bonus
11	August 4, 2023	978-4-592-22153-1	December 10, 2024	978-1-9753-9876-7
Death Flags 48–52; Bonus
12	October 5, 2023	978-4-592-22163-0	June 24, 2025	979-8-8554-0067-0
Death Flags 53–56
13	March 5, 2024	978-4-592-22164-7	September 23, 2025	979-8-8554-1515-5
Death Flags 57–61; Bonus
14	August 5, 2024	978-4-592-22165-4	April 28, 2026	979-8-8554-2223-8
Death Flags 62–66; Bonus
15	December 5, 2024	978-4-592-22216-3	January 26, 2027	979-8-8554-2225-2
16	May 2, 2025	978-4-592-22217-0	—	—
17	October 3, 2025	978-4-592-22218-7	—	—
Ex.2	October 3, 2025	978-4-592-22230-9	—	—
18	April 3, 2026	978-4-592-22219-4; 978-4-592-10641-8 (SE)	—	—
19	August 5, 2026	978-4-592-22220-0	—	—

=== Anime ===
An anime television series adaptation was announced on February 17, 2024. It is produced by Studio Deen and directed by Hiroaki Sakurai, with Mitsutaka Hirota overseeing series composition, characters designed by Tomoyo Sawada, and music composed by Ryūichi Takada. The series aired from October 9 to December 25, 2025, on TV Tokyo and other networks. (Note: TV Tokyo lists the series premiere on October 8 at 24:00, which is effectively October 9 at midnight JST.) The opening theme song is "Black Flame", performed by Kid Phenomenon from Exile Tribe, while the ending theme song is "Rengene" (リジェネ, Rijene), performed by Zerofrom. Crunchyroll streamed the series.

Two OVAs were released on April 3, 2026, as part of a special edition release of the manga's 18th volume.

==== Episodes ====
No.	Title	Directed by (Note: Production staff information is taken from the ending credits of each episode.)	Written by	Storyboarded by	Original release date
1	"Magical Ability Is More Important Than Study Ability"; Transliteration: "Taisetsu na no wa Gakuryoku yori Maryoku" (Japanese: 大切なのは学力より魔力)	Hiroaki Sakurai	Mitsutaka Hirota	Hiroaki Sakurai	October 9, 2025
As a teenager, Konoha Satou creates a novel containing a fictional world and gives the heroine her name, Konoha. Years later, Konoha dies in an accident after being run over by a truck and reincarnates as Konoha's villainess sister, Iana, just as she is being arrested by Konoha's fiancé Ginoford and sentenced to three months imprisonment at a distant family manor. Unfortunately, Iana knows she will be assassinated by Sol, her temporary butler who loves Konoha. To survive, Iana has to try to remember every detail of a story that she wrote as a teenager. She writes an apology letter to Konoha expressing support for her marriage to Ginoford, who in the story was Iana's fiancé first. Ginoford intercepts the letter and destroys it, as he is distrustful of Iana. She remembers Konoha only unlocks her heroine powers when their uncle puts Ginoford in a coma and tries to rape her. As she loves Konoha, she decides to stop her uncle, even though it might prevent Konoha becoming the heroine. Escaping, she prevents her uncle stabbing Ginoford, requiring Sol to then stop him stabbing Iana instead. Ginoford mistakenly believes that all of Iana's villainess behavior was to prevent his marriage to Konoha so her uncle wouldn't kill them, so he forgives her. Unfortunately, Konoha now hasn't become the heroine, leaving her defenceless against the dangers in the rest of the story, and should Konoha die, Sol will blame Iana and kill her.
2	"A Lavish Ball Is Better Than Obon Dancing"; Transliteration: "Bon Odori yori Budōkai" (Japanese: 盆踊りより舞踏会)	Shunji Yoshida	Mitsutaka Hirota	Hiroaki Sakurai	October 16, 2025
While out in the forest, Konoha is kidnapped by the Carnal Beast, which Iana had written during the years she was obsessed with sex. She is able to inform Ginoford that Konoha will be safe until dawn, though she doesn't actually say what the Beast will do to Konoha at dawn. Sol finds it suspicious how she knows any of this. Iana finds and tries to protect Konoha, but the Beast is driven away by Ginoford and Sol. Iana is injured by the Beast. Iana's father, Count Magnolia, cancels Sol's order to assassinate Iana. Two months later, with Iana's imprisonment over, her father invites her to a royal ball, which Iana realizes is Chapter Three, when the King notices Konoha dancing and declares her the Saint before sending her on dangerous adventures. As Konoha doesn't have her heroine powers, Iana must prevent Konoha from dancing. As such, she distracts the men that Konoha was supposed to dance with; a Knight Captain, the Lily Kingdom's playboy prince, and the Rose Kingdom's youngest prince. Having prevented Konoha from dancing, Sol demands to know if she is trying to protect Konoha or ruin her life. A fire breaks out, which was not in the story Iana wrote, and she becomes trapped. Outside, Konoha admits that she twisted her ankle before the ball and is sure Iana only tried to stop her dancing to prevent further pain. Sol rescues Iana, claiming she is not allowed to die until he knows who she really is. This makes her heart race, though she is uncertain why.
3	"You're the One Who Sent Me the Dark History?"; Transliteration: "Omae ga Okuttankai, Kuro Rekishi" (Japanese: お前が送ったんかい、黒歴史)	Yumi Kamakura	Sayuri Ōba	Yumi Kamakura	October 23, 2025
Iana is shocked to meet Yomi Blacksarana, a villain in love with Iana who will try to kill Konoha after Iana's execution. To stop him from targeting Konoha, she claims to have put her evil plans behind her. Yomi doubts that Iana loves Konoha now as it was he that sent her the relic that accidentally awakened her memories of Japan, as part of a plot to erase her sister's mind. Missing her evil self, Yomi decides that she has been brainwashed by Konoha after watching the sisters spend time together. Sol becomes suspicious of why she is spending so much time with Yomi. Iana is confused when Sol strokes her cheek while Yomi grows jealous of him. Iana remembers that Yomi's original plan was to lure Konoha to a roof to kill her. That night, she impersonates Konoha and is kidnapped by the unaware Yomi. Sol, who had seen Iana sneaking into Konoha's room, follows them just as Konoha and Ginoford arrive. Iana confronts Yomi and insists Konoha is not her enemy. Yomi misinterprets and decides the problem must be Sol bullying her on Konoha's orders. Sol overhears her saying she needs him to keep Konoha safe before a strong wind pushes her off the roof. After saving her, Sol pretends to believe her claims they were stargazing. Due to another misunderstanding, Yomi decides that he must protect Iana by figuring out how to kill Sol, while Iana must somehow keep Sol alive to protect Konoha.
4	"No Matter Who Dies, I'm Gonna End Up a Suspect"; Transliteration: "Dōse Dare ga Shindemo Watashi ga Utagawareru nda" (Japanese: どうせ誰が死んでも私が疑われるんだ)	Naoki Murata	Sayuri Ōba	Hiroyuki Fukushima	October 30, 2025
Iana realizes that if Yomi kills Sol, she will be blamed and executed. Similarly, if Yomi tries and fails to kill Sol, she will still be blamed and executed. Yomi uses wind magic to suddenly throw Sol high into the air, but he lands without injury. Luckily, Sol remains unaware Yomi can use magic and so doesn't suspect him, though he finds Iana's panic to be suspicious. Next, Yomi tries to poison Sol during a tea party, but Iana manages to spill the teacup in an "accident", to which Sol almost discovers the poison while Iana recalls writing Yomi as a character with a terrible childhood in her past life. Third, Yomi sets off a magic trap that sprouts a plant monster to attack Konoha. Iana manages to distract the monster, which is killed by Sol and Ginoford. Having actually found out about the poison from before, Sol asks Iana about everything that has happened lately, but before she can explain, Yomi takes responsibility for the attempts on Sol's life. He also challenges Sol to a duel. Konoha tries to intervene, but Yomi threatens to challenge her to a duel as well. Furious, Sol duels Yomi and Ginoford forbids Iana from interfering. Ginoford notices that Sol appears weaker than usual and Iana realizes Sol must have injured his sword hand when previously saving her from falling off the roof. Fed up with everything, she gets in between Sol and Yomi and exposes Sol's injury. Claiming it would insult the God of Battle to let him continue, she appoints herself as his Second and insists on dueling Yomi on his behalf.
5	"A Sick Person's Temperature Is Taken Forehead to Forehead"; Transliteration: "Byōnin no Netsu wa Gaku o Awasete Hakaru" (Japanese: 病人の熱は額を合わせて計る)	Shunji Yoshida	Sayuri Ōba	Hiroyuki Fukushima	November 6, 2025
Yomi is further puzzled by Iana's behavior while Iana herself can't move because of how heavy her sword is. Yomi decides to admit defeat and Sol demands an explanation. A panicked Iana claims that Yomi was just trying to protect her. Ginoford is convinced that it was all a misunderstanding. Iana then collapses from exhaustion. After being taken to her room, Yomi deducts that she has a fever and Konoha is relieved that she's okay, but Yomi forces her out to ensure that she won't bother Iana. Yomi also suspects that Konoha is up to no good and attempts to confront her, but is stopped by Iana. Desperate to keep Yomi from harming Konoha, she pretends to have reverted to her evil ways to make him listen to her, though he seemingly continues to plot against Konoha. Ginoford visits her and recalls their past confrontations before thanking her for her unintentional help. Iana is struck by rough memories from her past life. After giving Ginoford a book to read for her, he leaves. Sol is the last to visit with medicine for her and the two talk things over regarding the fight with Yomi before the others return. Iana worries that she may still be killed in the future. Yomi announces that he's going to stay for a while because the way back to his home is blocked, making Iana worry even further.
6	"If the Suspect Is Identified, Is Death a Certainty?"; Transliteration: "Yōgisha Kettei de Shibō Kakutei?" (Japanese: 容疑者決定で死亡確定？)	Mitsuki Kobayashi	Mitsutaka Hirota	Mitsuki Kobayashi	November 13, 2025
Iana and Konoha sneak into town together, where Konoha is swarmed by fans, but they also flee from the still-worried Iana. Sol arrives angry to bring them back home, but Konoha insists that the trip was her idea to celebrate Iana recovering from her illness. Ginoford reveals that several women have been kidnapped recently, so he was worried about Konoha. Vice Captain of the Hydrangea Security Force, Cheneau Clematis, arrives and confirms that five ladies have disappeared. Iana cannot remember Cheneau or the kidnapped ladies storyline, but is also fearful of him. After catching Iana eavesdropping on him, Cheneau violently accuses her of the kidnappings, since in the past, she bullied three of the victims. Cheneau reveals that he was the officer that originally arrested Iana and was furious that she avoided execution. He also blames her for the kidnapping of his sister. After Yomi and Sol stop him from harming Iana, who makes up an excuse to avoid being threatened, Cheneau leaves, but warns Iana that he will always punish the guilty. Later, Konoha receives a birthday invitation from Duchess Suselina Amaryllis, sister of the king. Due to the timing, Iana is convinced that this somehow involves the kidnapping storyline. At the party, Iana realizes that the Hydrangea Unit are acting as security for Suselina, including Cheneau. Trying to avoid him, she unsuccessfully tries to talk to other girls, who still think she's a villainess, and bumps into another guest covered in red wine. Getting her a new dress, the girl reveals that she is the daughter of a mistress and not a wife, yet her mother died recently, so her father took her in, but she is now being bullied by her half-sister Mika. She reveals that she is Menoa Camellia and Iana hopes that they might become friends since Menoa seems unaware of her villainess past. Ginoford is glad to see Iana with a woman other than Konoha. Iana finds that Menoa left an earring behind after she left.
7	"These Mental Images Are Rated For All Ages"; Transliteration: "Nōnai Eizō wa Zen Nenrei" (Japanese: 脳内映像は全年齢)	Naoki Murata	Mariko Kunisawa	Yumi Kamakura	November 20, 2025 (Note: This episode aired at 12:06 a.m. JST, 6 minutes after the regular air time on TV Tokyo.)
Iana goes to look for Menoa to return her earring, fearful of what would happen if someone stole it. She finds Menoa confronting Mika, who is shocked by her new dress and begins making a scene. This gets Cheneau's attention as Iana rushes in to help, resulting in her being covered in wine after Mika attempts to splash it over Menoa. Mika immediately starts to become afraid of Iana. Cheneau accuses Iana of being the one responsible for the incident, but Konoha comes to her defense and Sol helps her escape, having her take a bath to wash the wine off of her. She didn't enjoy the bath because there was no hot water. As Sol dries her off, Menoa arrives and, thinking that Iana is being assaulted, helps her escape before Iana clears up the misunderstanding and fears that she might be in trouble for calling herself a friend. Menoa isn't upset at all as she does consider Iana a friend since Mika's behavior has changed in Iana's presence while Sol eavesdrops on them. Due to a storm, Iana's group have to stay at Amaryllis's place until then. Ginoford finds Menoa's earring, which Iana forgot to return and worries that her friendship with Menoa could be broken if she thinks that Iana stole it, convincing Ginoford to keep it a secret. Konoha is invited to a meeting with Amaryllis. While going to return the earring to Menoa, she finds Mika arguing with the Hydrangea Unit of her half-sister's whereabouts and accuses Iana due to her past as a villainess. She is brought before Yamato Hydrangea, the Hydrangea Unit's captain, who questions her about Menoa's earring. Iana explains her real intentions, and he decides to put her under Cheneau's supervision unless there's evidence that proves her innocence. Iana learns that Konoha is ill and visits her. Recalling the story's plot, she remembers that Konoha will become a victim to Bloody Rosa, who is the one responsible for the kidnappings and is suspected to be Amaryllis. Iana decides to find the missing girls herself.
8	""Original" is a Magical Set Of Letters I Remembered! Bloody Rosa!"; Transliteration: "『Orijinaru』wa Mahō no Go-moji" (Japanese: 『オリジナル』は魔法の5文字)	Shunji Yoshida	Mariko Kunisawa	Hiroaki Sakurai	November 27, 2025
Iana escapes through a window using a makeshift rope to locate the basement and find the hostages. She suddenly encounters Cheneau, who chases her down and eventually corners her. Iana finally confesses her motive, but Cheneau is skeptical as she has no proof and thinks that Amaryllis is innocent. She manages to convince Cheneau to help her, mostly because the storm is keeping them from leaving, but he warns her that he will have her arrested if no proof is found; however, they don't know that they are being watched by a mysterious figure. Yamato learns of Iana's escape from Ginoford, causing them to suspect that she is responsible for the disappearances of the missing girls, but Ginoford does not tell Yamato about the earring. After failing to find the basement entrance, Iana heads to the conservatory after piecing some clues together. After turning an angel statue's head, the nearby fountain moves to reveal a hidden staircase. The figure appears and knocks them out. Meanwhile, Konoha awakens crying, sensing something evil below and tells this to Sol and Ginoford. Iana and Cheneau wake up in the basement imprisoned with Menoa and the other missing girls by the figure, who is indeed Amaryllis, providing Iana right. Cheneau is shocked by Amaryllis's true colors, also revealing that it was she who kidnapped his sister. Amaryllis attempts to rape Cheneau, but Iana warns her that she won't be able to remove his clothes, revealing that when writing the story, she made certain clothes that are only removeable to the wearer. Amaryllis then turns her attention to Iana and tries to convince her to join forces as she knows of her past as a villainess, but she declines. Enraged, Amaryllis decides to kill her and drink her blood to sustain her beauty. Iana remembers that in her past life, Amaryllis's sister died from an illness, but she made Amaryllis promise to stay beautiful no matter what. She uses this knowledge to get Amaryllis to stop, but this was only temporarily as Amaryllis is still bent on killing Iana and framing her for the kidnappings; Konoha is the only one who can pacify Amaryllis. She pulls out a large scythe and uses it to cut off Iana's clothes and restraints, leaving her in her underwear and shackles. Before she can finish off Iana, Cheneau forcefully frees himself from his restraints and defends Iana, but his wrists are now broken. He urges Iana to flee and get help while he holds back Amaryllis, but she threatens to have her servants harm the hostages if Iana tries to escape. Discovering that her shackles are already broken, Iana instead chooses to stay and help Cheneau. She then prepares to face Amaryllis head on.
9	"Self-Evaluations Are Unreliable"; Transliteration: "Jiko Hyōka Nante ate ni Naranai" (Japanese: 自己評価なんてあてにならない)	Akiko Sano	Mariko Kunisawa	Akiko Sano	December 4, 2025 (Note: This episode aired at 12:10 a.m. JST, 10 minutes after the regular air time on TV Tokyo.)
Amaryllis is unfazed by Iana's threats as Iana herself can't really fight back, but the Hydrangea Unit arrives at the last second. Iana is given a coat to cover herself. It turns out Konoha led them to Iana's location after sensing Amaryllis's evil nature, which confuses Iana as she has not awakened her powers yet. Mika is also revealed to be a guy masquerading as a woman this whole time and is a part of the Hydrangea Unit. Yamato easily defeats Amaryllis. With the kidnapped woman rescued, Iana reunites with her friends and sister, though the women who weren't captured are still wary of Iana. Iana's fears of death slowly begin to emerge again as she remembers key parts of the story. Amaryllis and her servants are arrested, but she requests for one last taste of wine, which is actually poisoned and she is attempting to commit suicide. Knowing this, Iana prevents this and Amaryllis's servants attempt to attack her in retaliation, but Sol stops them. After Amaryllis is taken away, the Hydrangea Unit, with support from Menoa and Ginoford, deduct that Iana is not in league with Amaryllis after all. While returning home, Iana's death phobia continues to flow after sensing anger in Sol, and even tries to carry a bag containing something heavy. Yomi reunites with Iana, though she doesn't tell him about Amaryllis. They discover that Konoha's room has been ransacked, with the item inside the bag from before missing; it is revealed to be a large ornament that was given to Konoha. When servants suspect Iana of stealing it, Iana's phobia grows even stronger and she runs away. She attempts to find the true thief so everyone won't accuse her, though her actions scare the gardeners. Sol and Yomi follow her. After remembering how she created the story, she discovers that the thief appears to be a monkey and attempts to attack it, but Sol arrives and warns her that the monkey is actually a monster. He manages to kill it using the pitchfork that Iana brought with her. It turns out the ornament that Konoha received is a monster egg and the monkey monster is what hatched from it. Sol suspects that someone is trying to kill Konoha, but also grows suspicious of Iana's actions. Iana shrugs this off after assuming that Sol was just worried about her. They, Konoha, and Ginoford later speak with Cheneau, who reveals that Amaryllis had committed suicide and a funerial will be held for her; this is what happened in the original story and Iana sees that her changes are being corrected to the previous storyline. Meanwhile, a mysterious man, who was the one who sent Konoha the monster egg and manipulated Amaryllis, watches from the distance and continues his diabolical game.
10	"I Know Less of the Beauty of Elves than of Normies in the Human World"; Transliteration: "Ningen-kai no Ria Takashi Yori Erufu no Utsukushi sa" (Japanese: 人間界のリア充よりエルフの美しさ)	Akiko Sano	Mitsutaka Hirota	Iku Suzuki	December 11, 2025
Iana suffers from nightmares of Amaryllis as she, Konoha, Yomi, Ginoford, and Sol travel to Daisy Lake to relax following a rough ride. Iana still cannot overcome her phobia though. After catching fish, Konoha and Iana are approached by a young elf requesting them to help his injured comrade. They bring the two to the mansion that they are staying in. Iana remembers how she pictured elves in her past life. The young elf introduces himself as Kagura Ivy and the other elf is Shukuna. After Shukuna recovers, they attempt to escort the elves home, but Shukuna doesn't wish to reveal their location to humans, though he reconsiders due to him being attracted to Konoha. As Shukuna is heading home, Iana senses something off. She remembers that in the previous story, the Vampire Lord attacked the elves when the seal imprisoning it failed, and Shukuna ran to Konoha for help. She saved the village, but Shukuna was killed in the process. After convincing Kagura to not follow Shukuna for his own safety, Iana decides to sneak off to the village alone at night to repair the seal before the vampire can attack, but Sol catches her. Rather than trying to stop her, he asks to go with her instead. She agrees, but Yomi also accompanies them. The mysterious man from before watches them as Kagura runs through the forest. Reaching the elven village, Sol notices that Iana seems aware of how to enter the village and starts growing jealous of Yomi interacting with Iana. The group enter a forbidden cave in the village to search for the Vampire Lord's tomb. Iana locates the Vampire Lord's coffin and finds it empty, leaving behind the broken stake used to maintain the seal.
11	"A Life is More Important than Adoration!"; Transliteration: "Moe Yori Inochi ga Daiji!" (Japanese: 萌えより命が大事！)	Shunji Yoshida	Mitsutaka Hirota	Yumi Kamakura	December 18, 2025
Iana rushes to find the Vampire Lord with the stake. Sol worries for her, but Yomi stops him from getting in the way. Iana encounters from elves who are under the Vampire Lord's control and fights them using the stake. Ivy is attacked by some of the brainwashed elves, but Yomi saves him and Iana. Sol also comes to their aid. However, the elves quickly recover despite receiving fatal blows. Fearing that the vampire lord's infection will spread outside the village, Iana knows that they need to stop the vampire lord. They and Kagura run from more brainwashed elves, but they are eventually surrounded. The elves reveal that they are targeting Konoha before Shukuna helps the group escape and informs them of the situation. He takes them through a dark corridor and tells them about how vampires can be defeated. The reason why they are after Konoha is because she is a Saint and cannot be turned into a vampire. Shukuna is wary of facing the Vampire Lord, but Sol forces him to talk. Shukuna tells them about a temple that the Vampire Lord will go to and also explains that he hid because he was powerless in the situation, making Iana realize that he would've taken action if Konoha had gotten her powers. Shukuna then reveals that he has already been turned into a vampire, having willing allowed this, and bites Iana. He traps Iana and Sol inside a room and leaves, hoping that Iana's transformation will lure in Konoha. Yomi tries to free them. Iana fears that she may attack Sol after transforming. Assuming that she intends to kill herself, Sol stops her as she begins to succumb to the transformation. Meanwhile, at the temple, Shukuna tells the Vampire Lord of his plan to bring Konoha to them, but the Vampire Lord decides to see Iana personally.
12	"Kindness, Strength, and the Man I Must Erase"; Transliteration: "Yasashi sa to Tsuyo sa to Watashi ga Kesubeki Kyarakutā" (Japanese: 優しさと強さと私が消すべき男(キャラクター))	Hiroaki Sakurai	Mitsutaka Hirota	Hiroaki Sakurai	December 25, 2025
Iana, now seemly under the Vampire Lord's control, brings an unconscious Sol to the Vampire Lord herself, claiming have bitten him so to make him transform into a vampire too. As he and Shukuna continue their plan to attract Konoha, Sol and Iana attack him and Iana stabs him with the stake. It turns out Iana managed to resist the transformation thanks to a sample of Konoha's blood that she got earlier, since Konoha herself is immune to the transformation, and she and Sol planned this to trick the Vampire Lord. Iana recalls how this part of the story would play out. With the Vampire Lord dead, all the elves return to normal. The two find Yomi injured by Kagura, who turns out to be the mastermind behind the whole thing, and reveals his true dark nature; it was he who freed the Vampire Lord and injured Shukuna in the first place. It is also revealed that Kagura is the mysterious man from before and is a member of a sinister group called Schwartz Le Chevalier, who are trying to awaken Konoha's powers for their own means. Iana does not remember this as part of the story. With his plan foiled, Kagura retreats and he is lectured by other members of Schwartz Le Chevalier for his recklessness, also revealing that his true name is Agni, but they continue with their plans to use Konoha for their own intentions. After Iana's group return to the mansion, a doctor tends Yomi's injuries. Iana blames herself for what happened and confesses Kagura's ulterior motives to Ginoford while they are alone, who takes it lightly. Later, an accident occurs in the kitchen when Iana and Ginoford try cooking, Yomi slowly recovers, and Iana's phobia continues to bother her when it is suggested that Yomi should stay at Ginoford's family home.
13 (OVA)	"Yomi, Jealousy, and a Birthday / Iana and Sol's Feverish Day"	Unknown	Unknown	TBA	April 4, 2026
Iana and Yomi argue over her dangerous use of the kitchen, upsetting Iana as she was trying to make Yomi a birthday cake. Iana decides to get him the newly invented Super Omnipotent Potion instead. Iana encounters a young boy who offers to guide her, though seems suspicious why she wants such a potion. As the shop is closed, Iana returns home. During a rainstorm, the boy appears with news the shop is finally open. Iana buys the potion but the boy vanishes; revealing he was secretly Yomi made younger by a potion. The rain gives Yomi a fever, but when he awakens, he realises Iana bought the potion for him, so they reconcile. Iana catches a fever and is surprised Sol takes care of her now. The maids lie that Konoha is ill so Sol goes to see her. A maid gets revenge on Iana for her villainess past by opening the window, letting in the cold so she gets sicker. Sol rushes Iana to Ginoford's doctor Yatori. He also punishes the maid. Iana recovers, but learns Sol caught her cold. Sol is surprised to find Iana caring for him, but assumes it is a dream and asks her to hold his hand. He awakes later to Iana gone and his childhood friend Augnieth the assassin there to torment him. Iana returns and finds them fighting like children, but excitedly assumes they are secret lovers, traumatising Sol.

=== Other media ===
A voice drama was released in the December 2021 issue of LaLa on October 22, 2021. It featured the voices of Sumire Uesaka, Yoshitsugu Matsuoka, and Hiroshi Kamiya.

== Reception ==
By February 2024, the series had over 1.7 million copies in circulation.
