= Pearl Pink =

Japanese manga series

天然パールピンク (Tennen Pearl Pink)
- Genre: Fantasy, Romance
- Manga
- Written by: Meca Tanaka
- Published by: Hakusensha
- English publisher: NA: Tokyopop
- Magazine: LaLa
- Original run: April 24, 2002 – April 24, 2004
- Volumes: 4

Pearl Pink (天然パールピンク, Tennen Pāru Pinku; lit. "Clueless Pearl Pink") is a manga series written and illustrated by Meca Tanaka. Originally serialized in Japan in LaLa from April 2002 through April 2004, the individual chapters were collected and published in four tankōbon volumes by Hakusensha. The series follows the romance between Tamoko, the daughter of a top idol who must keep her identity secret, and her childhood friend Kanji, whose talent agent father represents Tamoko's mother.

The series is licensed for English language release in North America by Tokyopop, which released the series volumes from January 2007 through January 2008. The series was adapted into a drama CD spin-off by Geneon Entertainment.

== Plot ==
While going to his father's business, high schooler Kanji runs across some bullies robbing an elementary school student. Before he can come to their aid, a blond boy jumps in a beats the bullies up but they escape on Kanji's scooter. The boy gives chase, promising to catch them while Kanji wonders how the boy knows his name. Later, he learns the boy is actually a girl named Tamako, the daughter of his father's talent agency's top talent, idol Shinju Momono. They were actually friends ten years before, but Kanji doesn't appear to remember Tamako though she hasn't forgotten him. Tamako was living with her grandmother until now, as Shinju was only a teenager at the time she became pregnant and wasn't able to support a child. However, if it were revealed that Shinju had been an unwed, teen mother when her "image" was built on being innocent and pure, her career would be ruined so the agency demands that Tamoko's relationship to her be kept a secret and Tamako must go to live with Kanji and his father.

== Media ==
=== Manga ===
Pearl Pink premiered in Japan in LaLa magazine's April 24, 2002 issue where it ran monthly until its conclusion in the April 24, 2004 issue. The individual chapters were collected and published in four tankōbon volumes by Hakusensha, with the first volume released December 5, 2002. The final volume was released July 5, 2004.

The series is licensed for English language release in North America by Tokyopop, which released the first volume on January 9, 2007. The final volume was released on January 8, 2008.

No.	Original release date	Original ISBN	English release date	English ISBN
1	December 5, 2002	4-59217-083-0	January 9, 2007	978-1-59816-775-7
2	May 2, 2003	4-59217-084-9	May 8, 2007	978-1-59816-776-4
3	December 12, 2003	4-59217-089-X	September 11, 2007	978-1-59816-777-1
4	July 5, 2004	4-59217-090-3	January 8, 2008	978-1-59816-778-8

=== Drama CD ===
A drama CD adaptation was released by Geneon Entertainment on January 23, 2004, containing ten tracks containing original spin-off stories of the series.

== Reception ==
Katherine Luther, writing for about.com, described Pearl Pink as "a fun and comedic look at young love", recommending it for readers who like romance manga. A. E. Sparrow, writing for IGN, described it as a book "tough to pigeonhole", and an exceptionally humorous way of telling the "standard shojo tale of girl pursuing guy".

Michelle Ramonetti, writing for mania.com, gave a very in-depth review, praising the art as "pure sugar" and saying that "every page packs some kind of visual treat, be it detailed backgrounds, wispy hair, lovely screen tones, round, intense eyes, and more physical beauty than you can shake a stick at. Even Tamako, who spends most of the volume looking more like a boy than a girl, gets an idol's makeover near the end. That might make other series hard to take seriously, but here it works just fine." Ramonetti goes on to describe the story as endearing, although points out some flaws, such as an anticlimactic story arc involving Tamako's grandmother, and a strange "emphasis on Tamako's current strength vs. her crybaby past". Ramonetti ends her review by recommending the manga for fans of romantic, shoujo comedy, and especially for fans who "like a dash of the entertainment industry thrown in".
