= Omukae desu =

Japanese manga series

- Cover of volume 1.

お迎えです。
- Manga
- Written by: Meca Tanaka
- Published by: Hakusensha
- English publisher: CMX Manga
- Magazine: LaLa
- Original run: 1999 – 2002
- Volumes: 5
- Manga
- Published by: Hakusensha
- Magazine: LaLa
- Original run: February 2016 – May 2016
- Volumes: 1
- Television drama
- Original network: Nippon Television
- Original run: April 2016 – June 2016
- Episodes: 9

Omukae desu (お迎えです。) is a Japanese shōjo manga series written and illustrated by Meca Tanaka and published by Hakusensha, with serialization from 1999 to 2002 on LaLa and with five volumes compiling the chapters. A one-shot sequel volume was published in early 2016 on the same magazine. The original manga was adapted into a Japanese television drama series, which ran from April to June 2016 on Nippon Television.

== Plot ==
Madoka Tsutsumi is a college student hopeful who has an emotionless and quiet streak that made others label him "scary", in spite of the fact that he is actually a geek with a penchant for analyzing. He is spiritually aware, and with this ability, he comes across a man in a bunny suit chasing an old man, who turns out to be a spirit. The former introduces himself as a shinigami named Nabeshima, who, alongside his assistant Yuzuko, works for GSG, an organization with the goal of helping spirits to move on from their regrets and enter the afterlife. Nabeshima requests that Madoka accept a part-time job to help the spirits using his possession ability, which allows the spirits to interact with the living, in exchange for an "easy entry to the afterlife" once he dies.

As Madoka continues throughout the next three college years doing the part-time jobs, he is introduced to Sachi Aguma, a high school girl and fellow GSG part-timer who is capable of astral projecting and has a crush on Nabeshima, despite his insistence that humans and shinigami are not meant to be together. On the other hand, one of the spirits that he has to deal with is revealed to be a high schoolmate, Chisato Ogawa, who had admired Madoka for a long time but never managed to gain the courage to confess until her death. Chisato does not reveal her feelings until she has to go to the afterlife, which greatly depresses Madoka, as her feelings are in fact mutual.

To alleviate his mood, Aguma proposes for Madoka to briefly enter the afterlife to say a proper goodbye to Chisato. With Nabeshima and Aguma's help, Madoka confesses his feelings to Chisato, though the latter encourages him to pursue Aguma instead. Later, while Madoka is helping Aguma to woo Nabeshima, he insists that he will wait for her until she is ready to move on from him, a suggestion that she takes note.

== Characters ==
- Madoka Tsutsumi (堤 円, Tsutsumi Madoka)

The series' main protagonist, Madoka is a seemingly eternally-emotionless college student who is actually an ardent geek with a hobby of analyzing everything he sees. However, because he rarely expresses emotions, many others think that he is scary and avoid him. Despite this, he finds a surprising amount of things cute, including Yuzuko's childlike appearance and later Aguma's boisterous personality. Madoka has the ability to see spirits and become a vessel for them to inhabit, allowing them to interact with the living and thus be able to move past their regrets quickly. He is chosen as a part-timer for GSG, an organization of shinigami dealing with spirits who have trouble moving into the afterlife. Due to a misreading of his name during their introduction, Nabeshima calls Madoka as "En-chan" ("En" being an alternate reading for the kanji of "Madoka"), which comes to be adopted by other characters, such as Yuzuko. A chapter reveals that Madoka used to play baseball during high school.
It is later revealed that Madoka is in love with Chisato and becomes depressed when the latter leaves for the afterlife without saying a proper goodbye to him. The mission to say goodbye to her serves as the plot of the series' final chapter. He manages to confess, but his request to stay with her is rejected, as Chisato wants him to be with Aguma instead. In an extra chapter, it is hinted that Madoka also harbors feelings for Aguma when he states his willingness to wait for her after she has grown to accept her inability to be with Nabeshima.
In the live-action adaptation, Madoka's personal life is elaborated: instead of living in an apartment by himself, he resides in his family's house alongside his mother, Yumiko, and stepfather, Ikuo, and stepsister, Sayaka. His gift for baseball is also changed into a gift for rocket-building, an activity that he promotes through a college club.
Madoka is voiced by Akira Ishida in the CD drama and portrayed by Sota Fukushi in the live-action TV adaptation.

- Nabeshima (ナベシマ)

A shinigami who works in the Division 2 of GSG, an organization intent in helping spirits move on. He constantly switches between flamboyant clothing due to the GSG's policy of adopting a specific theme each day, though he prefers a pink bunny suit, which he wears when Madoka first meets him. He is rather easy to get irritated with and voices displeasure at Aguma's love for him not only due to the GSG's policy of strict separation between human and nonhuman beings, but also because he knows that even without the policy, they are bound to be separate anyway. Despite this, Nabeshima has a softer side and is easily attached to things, hence why he avoids becoming involved, so he does not have to grieve for them.
In the live-action adaptation, Nabeshima is more polite and does not respond to Aguma's crush as harsh as he does in the manga. The circumstances of his life before becoming a shinigami is also explored: as a human named Masato Murakami, he sacrificed himself to protect his younger sister, Asami, from falling into sharp rocks. An adult Asami appears in the last two episodes of the series.
Nabeshima is voiced by Ryōtarō Okiayu in the CD drama and portrayed by Ryohei Suzuki in the live-action TV adaptation.

- Yuzuko (ゆずこ)

Nabeshima's assistant in the Division 2 of GSG. Despite her petite appearance, Yuzuko is very mature for her age and becomes the voice of reason between the group's bickering at each other. In her past life, Yuzuko was a sickly girl who was given attention by a boy, with whom she fell in love. She later discovers that the boy currently works at a bakery near Madoka's apartment, though since her appearance has changed after her death, he does not recognize her.
Yuzuko is voiced by Omi Minami in the CD drama and portrayed by Kokone Hamada in the live-action TV adaptation.

- Sachi Aguma (阿熊 幸, Aguma Sachi)

A high school girl who is contracted to be a part-timer for the GSG due to her ability to not only see ghosts, but also conduct astral projection. She is easily agitated and voices her opinion bluntly and loudly, something that Madoka finds cute. She is madly in love with Nabeshima ever since the latter helped her move on from her grandfather's death and constantly attempts to hug him. Aguma's unusual boldness has made at least two people fall for her: a sickly narcissistic girl curious of her indifference towards her, and a student of her karate dojo whom she took care of after every training. In an extra chapter, Aguma tells Madoka that she will continue seeing Nabeshima for a while, before possibly turning her attention to him.
In the live-action adaptation, Aguma is turned into a college student who enrolls in the same university as Madoka. Additionally, instead of being the heiress of a karate dojo, Aguma is made a lonely rich girl with a distant father and an ignorant, though well-minded, mother.
Aguma is voiced by Satsuki Yukino in the CD drama and portrayed by Tao Tsuchiya in the live-action TV adaptation.

- Tsuda (津田)

Madoka's best friend since high school. Tsuda fell in love with a teacher, Miki Yajima, who was killed shortly after graduation ceremony. Since then, he sulks at his apartment and does not attend university, until Madoka allows himself to be possessed by the teacher, who convinces him to move on. One of the series' extra chapters focuses on a high schoolgirl's attempt to declare her love for Tsuda, a confession that Tsuda seems to accept according to the final chapter.
In the live-action series, Tsuda does not appear, though his persona seems to be inherited by two different characters. His role as Madoka's best friend is taken by the bespectacled Takashi Kato, a fellow geek and Madoka's only partner in the rocket extracurricular club. His relationship with Yajima, on the other hand, is given to Ryoji Nakamura, a college-aged stranger for Madoka.
Tsuda is voiced by Kentarō Itō in the CD drama.

- Chisato Ogawa (緒川 千里, Ogawa Chisato)

A former high schoolmate of Madoka. She fell in love with Madoka and admired him from the distance, but was unable to confess until she died. As a spirit, Chisato follows Madoka everywhere and saves him from being crushed by pipes while playing ping pong, accidentally exposing her to the GSG. She then seeks refuge in Aguma, who allows her to borrow her body for a summer festival that she and Madoka attend before she goes to the afterlife. Despite her best attempts, Madoka sees through the lie anyway. However, it is revealed that her feelings are mutual; Madoka is in love with her as well.
Saying goodbye to Chisato later becomes the plot of the series' final chapter: Madoka, who becomes depressed after Chisato left, is convinced by Aguma to see her one last time in the afterlife. When the two meet, Chisato is surprised by Madoka's confession, but states that he should instead seek out Aguma, instead of continuously sulking about her.
In the live-action series, Chisato is promoted into a main character and impacts the plot more than she does in the manga.
Chisato is voiced by Aya Hisakawa in the CD drama and portrayed by Mugi Kadowaki in the live-action TV adaptation.

== Volumes ==
- 1 (December 4, 1999)
- 2 (June 5, 2000)
- 3 (May 2, 2001)
- 4 (November 5, 2001)
- 5 (May 2, 2002)
- 6 (June 3, 2016)

== Reception ==
Carlo Santos of Anime News Network gave volume 1 a rating of C.

== Live-action adaptation ==
The manga was adapted into a live-action TV adaptation, which premiered on the Nippon Television in April 2016 and ended in June 2016 for a total of 9 episodes. It considerably expands the universe of the original while also removing or changing plot points (e.g. Aguma is made a university student, instead of a high school student).

=== Main characters ===
- Sota Fukushi as Madoka Tsutsumi
- Tao Tsuchiya as Sachi Aguma
- Ryohei Suzuki as Nabeshima
- Mugi Kadowaki as Chisato Ogawa
- Kokone Hamada as Yuzuko

=== Recurring characters ===
- Tōru Nomaguchi as Shinozaki
- Yūki Morinaga as Takashi Kato
- Karen Ootomo as Sayaka Tsutsumi
- Takuya Negishi as Matsumoto
- Yū Hirukawa as Mayuri
- Akari Matsukawa as Manami
- Saki Takaoka as Kumiko Aguma
- Kisuke Iida as Hiroshi Yamashita
- Mako Ishino as Yumiko Tsutsumi
- Ren Osugi as Ikuo Tsutsumi

=== Guest characters ===
- Shirō Itō as Yozo Baba (episode 1, 9)
- Miho Kanno as Reiko Sano (episode 1)
- Toshihiro Yashiba as Masamichi Sano (episode 1)
- Amon Kabe as Kazuya (episode 2, 9)
- Manami Higa as Mizue Masuda (episode 2)
- Hideyuki Kasahara as Tsutomu Yasuda (episode 2)
- Maho Nonami as Miki Yajima (episode 3, 4)
- Ryo Ryusei as Ryoji Nakamura (episode 3, 4)
- Hiroki Konno as Tamotsu (episode 3, 4)
- Yumiko Fujita as Yoshiko Kato (episode 5)
- Tokuma Nishioka as Kosuke Maeda (episode 5)
- Marie Iitoyo as Rie Egawa (episode 5)
- Susumu Terajima as Tatsuo (episode 6)
- Masaki Izawa as Shinnosuke Uehara (episode 6)
- Kanna Mori as Mari Uehara (episode 6)
- Yorie Yamashita as Kiyomi Sawamura (episode 7)
- Ryoko Kobayashi as Asami Murakami (episode 8, 9)
- Alisa Mizuki as Ritsuko Manabe (episode 9)
- Kei Tanaka as Hiroshi Hakamada (episode 9)
- Takashi Sumida as Yoshioka (episode 9)
- Yasufumi Hayashi as Ikeda (episode 9)
