= LaLa =

Japanese manga magazine

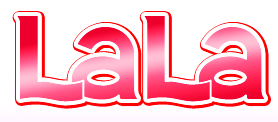

- Cover of April 2008 issue featuring Harukanaru Toki no Naka de by Tōko Mizuno
- Editor-in-chief: Ikushū Ichikawa
- Categories: Shōjo manga
- Frequency: Monthly
- Circulation: 45,200; (July–September 2026)
- First issue: July 1976
- Company: Hakusensha
- Country: Japan
- Based in: Chiyoda, Tokyo
- Language: Japanese
- Website: lala.ne.jp

LaLa is a monthly Japanese shōjo manga magazine published by Hakusensha on the 24th of each month. The magazine's bonus contents are usually calendars for New Year issues, drama CDs, and so on. In a 2006 survey conducted by Oricon, Japanese girls selected LaLa as their fifth favorite manga anthology, along with Shogakukan's Shōjo Comic and Kodansha's Weekly Shōnen Magazine.

== About ==
LaLa is the second shōjo manga magazine Hakusensha published. Manga serialized in LaLa are collected into tankōbon under the label "Hana to Yume Comics" (花とゆめコミックス), along with manga serialized in Hana to Yume. Fanbooks and illustration books for its series are published under the label "Hana to Yume Comics Special" (花とゆめコミックススペシャル).

Readers of the magazine are 97% female, while the other 3% are male readers. Its age demographic consists of 4% percent for under-13 readers, 23.4% for readers aged 13–17, 20% for readers aged 18–20, 13% for readers aged 21–23, while the remaining 29.7% of the readers are aged 24 years old and up. Readers aged 24 and up are the demographic of the highest percentage.

=== History ===
LaLa began its publication in July 1976 as a sister magazine to Hana to Yume. It was originally titled Hana to Yume LaLa (花とゆめ LaLa) and published bi-monthly. The magazine's first issue featured Ryoko Yamagishi's Hana no Seitachi (花の精たち) and was priced at 290 yen. The magazine's first editor-in-chief was Nobumasa Konagai. The current editor-in-chief is Ikushū Ichikawa.

In September 1977, the magazine changed its frequency and became a monthly magazine. It then became its own independent magazine.

In 1985, Hakusensha started irregularly publishing special publications of LaLa under different titles. It started with LaLa Deluxe, published seasonally. LaLa Deluxe later became the magazine's sister magazine LaLa DX.

Since the publication of LaLa Deluxe, various special or supplement issues have been published. Bessatsu LaLa: Bessatsu RaRa (別冊LaLa: 別冊ララ) was the first supplemental issue for LaLa. It was first published in Summer 1982 and ended in Spring 1984. Bessatsu LaLa (別冊Lala) succeeded Bessatsu LaLa: Bessatsu RaRa and was published bi-monthly from 1984 to 1985.

My LaLa, a special edited compilation of the magazine, was published from Autumn 1984 to Spring 1985. LaLa Special Wendy (LaLaスペシャルWendy) was published from Summer 1985 to June 1986, for a total of five issues.

LaLa Special Cindy (LaLaスペシャルCindy) then replaced LaLa Special Wendy. The first issue of LaLa Special Cindy was published from Summer 1986 to Autumn 1986. It was later revived for two issues, which were published from the Autumn to the Winter 1987 issues.

Since 2004, special or supplemental issues of LaLa have been published as LaLa Special, which serializes LaLa's side stories of the related series, as well as featuring various manga artists' one-shots.

=== Television commercials ===
The magazine had a series of commercials directed by Shō Yanagisawa called LaLa Kara no Oshirase (LaLaからのお知らせ; "Information from LaLa"). This series of commercials won the Grand Prix award in the film category for "Best of Communication Media and Publication" in Ad Fest 2009. LaLa Kara no Oshirase Sui'ei Hen (LaLaからのお知らせ 水泳 篇) and LaLa Kara no Oshirase Chikyū Ondanka Hen (LaLaからのお知らせ 地球温暖化篇) also won two silver medals in the same event. The series was also named as one of the "Gold Stars" in the 2nd Ad Stars 2009 Busan International Advertising Festival.

== Serializations ==
=== Current ===
- Natsume's Book of Friends (2005–present)
- School Babysitters (2009–present)
- Snow White with the Red Hair (2011–present)
- Tales of the Tendo Family (2017–present)
- The Dark History of the Reincarnated Villainess (2018–present)
- Agents of the Four Seasons: Dance of Spring (2022–present)

=== Past ===
==== 1976–1989 ====
- Wata no Kunihoshi (1978–1987)
- Hi Izuru Tokoro no Tenshi (1980–1984)
- Cipher (1984–1990)
- Sakura no Sono (1985–1986)
- Hanasakeru Seishōnen (1987–1994)
- Mikan Enikki (1988–1995)
- Moon Child (1989–1993)

==== 1990–1999 ====
- From Far Away (1991–2002)
- Eight Clouds Rising (1992–2002)
- Jyu-Oh-Sei (1993–2003)
- Kaguyahime (1994–2005)
- Kare Kano: His and Her Circumstances (1996–2005)
- Okojo-san (1996–2005)
- Land of the Blindfolded (1998–2004)
- Omukae desu (1999–2002)
- Captive Hearts (1999–2002)
- Venus in Love (1999–2004)

==== 2000–2009 ====
- Haruka: Beyond the Stream of Time (2000–2013)
- The Recipe for Gertrude (2001–2003)
- Millennium Snow (2001–2002)
- MeruPuri (2002–2004)
- Pearl Pink (2002–2004)
- Ouran High School Host Club (2002–2010)
- Demon Sacred (2003–2007)
- Beauty is the Beast (2002–2004)
- La Corda d'Oro (2004–2011)
- Palette of 12 Secret Colors (2004–2008)
- Me & My Brothers (2004–2009)
- Vampire Knight (2004–2013)
- Zig Zag (2004–2008)
- Maid Sama! (2005–2013)
- Wanted (2005)
- Two Flowers for the Dragon (2005–2009)
- Ballad of a Shinigami (2005)
- Penguin Revolution (2005–2007)
- My Darling! Miss Bancho (2006–2009)
- Flower in a Storm (2006–2010)
- Faster than a Kiss (2007–2012)
- The Secret Notes of Lady Kanoko (2007–2009)
- Library War (2007–2014)
- Eensy Weensy Monster (2007)
- Chotto Edo Made (2008–2011)
- Koi Dano Ai Dano (2009–2016)

==== 2010–2019 ====
- Last Game (2011–2016)
- Meteor Prince (2013–2014)
- Kawaii Tanuki mo Raku ja nai (2017–2022)
- Reverse X Rebirth (2019–2021)

==== 2020–present ====
- Together Forever (2020–2025)
- Mechanical Marie (2020–2023)
- Koi Dano Ai Dano: Kimi wa Boku no Taiyō da (2023–2025)
- Mechanical Marie+ (2025)
