= List of The Young Magician chapters =

The chapters of The Young Magician are written and illustrated by Yuri Narushima. The chapters have been serialized in the Japanese manga magazine Wings by Shinshokan since November 1995. Shinshokan collects the chapters into tankōbon volumes; eighteen volumes have been published so far.

In 2005, the manga imprint of DC Comics, CMX, announced that it had licensed The Young Magician for an English-language release in North America. CMX put together an eighty-page sampler of manga for mature readers—The Young Magician, Sword of the Dark Ones, Monster Collection: The Girl Who Can Deal With Magic Monsters, Testarotho and Madara—and distributed it to retailers on June 8, 2005. CMX published thirteen volumes of The Young Magician from September 1, 2005, to April 21, 2009. Scheduled for publication on May 11, 2010, the fourteen volume remained unreleased as DC Comics announced on May 18 that the CMX imprint would end on July 1.

== Volume list ==
No.	Original release date	Original ISBN	North American release date	North American ISBN
1	September 9, 1996	4-403-61424-8	September 1, 2005	978-1-4012-0737-3
"Jack the Ripper in Hong Kong"; "Afterword"
Aeromancer Rosalite and Carno, both members of the unrelated Guino clan, take on a case involving a series of murders occurring in 1996 Hong Kong. While the murders appear initially similar to those committed by the Victorian serial killer Jack the Ripper, they are actually being committed by a rival sorcerer and traitor to the Guino clan, Ernest Ram Guino, as a means to divine the future by reading the entrails of the slain girls. Carno prevents Ram's disciple from harming the next victim, a young Filipino maid named Monica, and kills him. Ram and Carno then prepare to fight each other.
2	March 10, 1997	4-403-61476-0	November 1, 2005	978-1-4012-0738-0
3	September 10, 1997	4-403-61476-0	February 1, 2006	978-1-4012-0739-7
4	June 10, 1998	4-403-61504-X	May 1, 2006	978-1-4012-0740-3
5	December 10, 1998	4-403-61527-9	August 23, 2006	978-1-4012-0741-0
6	July 8, 1999	4-403-61547-3	November 22, 2006	978-1-4012-1026-7
7	February 28, 2000	4-403-61578-3	February 28, 2007	978-1-4012-1027-4
8	July 19, 2001	4-403-61621-6	May 23, 2007	978-1-4012-1028-1
9	February 25, 2002	4-403-61664-X	August 22, 2007	978-1-4012-1029-8
10	October 10, 2002	4-403-61689-5	December 19, 2007	978-1-4012-1030-4
11	October 29, 2003	4-403-61733-6	February 27, 2008	978-1-4012-1031-1
12	September 24, 2004	4-403-61769-7	July 8, 2008	978-1-4012-1768-6
13	December 2, 2005	4-403-61813-8	April 21, 2009	978-1-4012-1769-3
14	July 23, 2011	978-4-403-61888-8	Never released	978-4-403-61888-8
15	September 24, 2011	978-4-403-62123-9	—	—
16	November 23, 2012	978-4-403-62152-9	—	—
17	January 25, 2014	978-4-403-62175-8	—	—
18	July 25, 2015	978-4-403-62201-4	—	—
