= Keys to the Kingdom =

Keys to the Kingdom may refer to:

== Books ==
- The Keys to the Kingdom, book series by Garth Nix
- The Key to the Kingdom, 2003 manga series

== Films ==
- Norm of the North: Keys to the Kingdom, sequel to the 2016 animated film Norm of the North

== Music ==
=== Albums ===
- Keys to the Kingdom (album), 2011 album by the North Mississippi Allstars
- The Key to the Kingdom, 1995 compilation album of gospel songs recorded on the Motown record label
- The Key To the Kingdom, 2009 album by Stephan Mathieu

=== Songs ===
- "Keys to the Kingdom" (song), 2014 song by Linkin Park
- "Key to the Kingdom", 1956 single by The Nutmegs
- "Key to the Kingdom", title track of a 2010 album by Lulu Roman
- "Key to the Kingdom", song by Spin Doctors on the 1999 album Here Comes the Bride
- "The Key to the Kingdom", song by Praga Khan on the 2003 album Not Strictly Rubens
- "Key to the Kingdom", song by Spencer Wiggins on the 2003 album of the same name
- "Keys to the Kingdom", song by The Myddle Class
- "Keys to the Kingdom", song by Group 1 Crew on the 2008 album Ordinary Dreamers
- "Keys to the Kingdom", song by Tiwa Savage and Mr Eazi on the 2019 album The Lion King: The Gift
- "Keys to the Kingdom", song by UNKLE on the 2007 album War Stories
- "I've Got a Key to the Kingdom", 1928 single by Blind Willie Davis, Paramount 12726
- "I've Got the Key to the Kingdom", 1929 single by Washington Phillips
- "The Key to My Kingdom", 1957 single by B.B. King and His Orchestra
- "Key to My Kingdom", song on the 2003 album of the same name by Enrico Crivellaro
- "Keys to the Kingdom", 2022 song by Sweet Taboo which represented California in the American Song Contest

== See also ==
- Keys of the Kingdom (disambiguation)
