= List of VS chapters =

The chapters of VS are written and illustrated by Keiko Yamada. It was serialized in Akita Shoten's shōjo magazine (aimed at teenage girls) Princess Comics. The individual chapters were released in 7 tankōbon volumes between June 1999 and December 24, 2001. The series is licensed in North America by CMX, which released the manga's 7 tankōbon volumes between April 1, 2006, and October 10, 2007.

Reiji Saioin, the top violinist in Hakuto Junior High School, is to be kicked out of the school if he does not win the next Japan National Music Contest due to his history of trouble. His private teacher and alum of Hakuto, Mitsuko Hane, is willing to help Reiji overcome his flaws to win the music contest. She wants Reiji to play the violin because she cannot due to her left arm being rendered useless after being burnt. Reiji has his own wishes to keep his sister, Miruka, who is abused by their father, happy. Along the way to win the music contest, Reiji becomes friends with Nachi Meiya, the best female violinist in Hakuto, and Aoi Kenzaki, a pianist-turned-violinist. He also has to deal with Bartholomew Asakura, the man who ruined Hane's arm, as well as his growing feelings for his teacher.

== Volume listing ==
| No. | Original release date | Original ISBN | English release date | English ISBN |
|---|---|---|---|---|
| 1 | June 1999 | 978-4-253-07837-5 | April 1, 2006 | 978-1-401-21068-7 |
Opus 1. Enfants Terribles; Opus 2. Setting Sail; Opus 3. Events of a Beautiful Night; Opus 4. Sacrifice
Reiji Saioin, a violinist at Hakuto Junior High School, practices a Tchaikovsky piece assigned by Shinohara. At the qualifier for the Japan National Music Contest, Reiji finds out that the assigned piece was Rachmaninoff's Hungarian Dances (from Aleko). Reiji manages to perform the piece by sight reading and is selected to perform in the Japan National Music Contest for a third time. After the performance, Reiji visits his little sister, Miruka, and discovers that her alcoholic father has been abusing her. Meanwhile, Hakuto's conductor, Marco Primavera, fires Shinohara for attempting to sabotage Reiji to prevent him from entering the contest. He also calls his ex-student, Mitsuko Hane, as a substitute teacher for Reiji. Shinohara unleashes his rage at Reiji, slashing at Reiji with a bow. Reiji manages to knock down Shinohara. After Reiji recovers at a hospital, Primavera formally introduces Hane to Reiji as his new personal instructor. Hane teaches Reiji how to play Massenet's Meditation from Thaïs. However, Reiji plays the piece without feeling. From Hane's files, he discovers that she has won the Japan National Music Contest twice by performing Paganini's Concerto for Violin No. 1 before burning her arm in an accident. He requests help from fellow violinist, Nachi Meiya. Meanwhile, Miruka visits Hane to tell her about her abusive father. Hane gives her a phone to call if she needs help. When Miruka desperately calls Reiji for help using Hane's phone, he and Hane rushes to his house. However, the Miruka is unconscious and the house is on fire from a stray cigarette. Reiji rushes into the burning house to rescue his sister. Miruka's father is imprisoned for child abuse and arson. Hane organises Miruka to be adopted by one of her friend's family.
| 2 | November 1999 | 978-4-253-07838-2 | July 6, 2006 | 978-1-401-21069-4 |
Opus 5. The Forest; Opus 6. Walking in the Rain; Opus 7. Dreams; Opus 8. Cherry Blossoms in the Evening
After Reiji lost his ability to play the violin, Hane took him to forest to recover. When he comes back to Hakuto, Reiji finds out that he has been replaced to play at the Japanese National Music Contest. Hane vouches for him and he his place back. However, on the day of his performance, Reiji's replacement gets his friends to kidnap Reiji and orders them to keep Reiji in their truck until the preliminaries are over. Hane overhears this and goes to save Reiji, breaking her left arm in the process. Reiji arrives at the concert hall just after the judges end the preliminary round of the contest. With backing from Nachi, Reiji is allowed to play Meditation from Thaïs on the condition that he is disqualified from the contest. After the contest, Hane tells Reiji to meet her new violin student in Kyoto and bring him back. The student is Aoi Kenzaki, piano prodigy from a family of famous musicians. After his performance, Aoi announces his plans to quit playing the piano and to go to Hakuto to learn violin. Then Reiji and Aoi perform Sibelius' Concerto together. However, Aoi faints after playing for 30 minutes due to his heart condition. Despite opposition from his grandfather, Aoi goes to Hakuto with Reiji and Hane as his teacher.
| 3 | April 13, 2000 | 978-4-253-07839-9 | October 4, 2006 | 978-1-401-21070-0 |
Opus 9. Friend or Foe; Opus 10. Alone Against the Orchestra; Opus 11. New York; Opus 12. A Feeling I Never Hade; Opus 13. Love
Aoi predicts that Reiji cannot perform with an orchestra. Reiji saves Aoi from drowning when other students from Hokuto throw Aoi's medicine into a pond. When Reiji practises Sibelius' Concerto with the Hakuto Philharmonic Orchestra, he mercilessly orders the other members of the orchestra around. At Nachi's party, the Hokuto faculty criticises Hane for Reiji's behavior and Aoi as a "crowd-drawing panda". Aoi, Reiji, Hane and Nachi go to New York together for the Hakuto Philharmonic Orchestra's performance there. Reiji gets kidnapped by Bartholomew Asakura, conductor of the New York Philharmonic. Bartholomew takes Reiji to perform in front of professional critics. Reiji's performance with the New York Philharmonic was commended. A flashback reveals that Bartholomew had a relationship with Hane when she was in her prime. When Reiji comes back to the concert hall, Hane advises him never to meet Bartholomew again alone. When Reiji questions her, she threatens to quit being his instructor. Then, Reiji realises he is in love with Hane.
| 4 | October 19, 2000 | 978-4-253-07840-5 | January 3, 2007 | 978-1-401-21071-7 |
Opus 14. Love Without a Person; Opus 15. Lost the Way; Opus 16. Summer Passes Quickly; Opus 17. The Girl with the Jewel-like Eye; Opus 18. The Forest of Autumn (Part 1)
Reiji asks Marco Primevera, Hakuto's conductor, about Hane's past. Before Hakuto's concert, Reiji instructs Aoi to perform so that her can search for Hane. At Bartholomew's place, he finds out that Bartholomew forced Hane to have sex with him in order to take Reiji on his European tour. Aoi performs a solo of Sibelius' Concerto before collapsing on stage. Reiji performs the same piece, receiving a standing ovation. After the concert, he meets his younger step-sister, Miruka. Reiji refuses Bartholomew's request in front of Hakuto's chairman. Nachi perform's Paganini's Concerto with Reiji as accompaniment. After the performance, Nachi forces Reiji to go to her family's party. There, Reiji stops Nachi's step-brother from sexually abusing her by punching him. Reiji takes Nachi to a cabin in the woods. However, before they get there, both of them get drenched by rain and falling into a lake.
| 5 | February 8, 2001 | 978-4-253-07841-2 | April 7, 2007 | 978-1-401-21071-7 |
Opus 18. The Forest of Autumn (Part 2); Opus 19. The Fox; Opus 20. The Fox Returns at Sundown; Opus 21. Partners in Crime; Opus 22. Kreutzer
Reiji gets reprimanded for his physical assault on Nachi's step-brother. Nachi confesses her love for Reiji. She throws a bucket of water at Aoi when he questions her clamming up whenever something serious happens. Nachi clears the incident with her family but fails to return to her dormitory. Reiji finds her under a tree. He kisses her to change her mind about quitting the violin. Nachi disappears but returns for the Japan National Contest. She withdraws in the second round but is allowed to continue due to her win in the previous contest. Reiji continues to cover Aoi's health problems. When Hane reveals that Aoi's doctor recommended Aoi to retire, Aoi lashes out at Reiji. Reiji performs Beethoven's Kreutzer in the second round of the contest while Aoi gets himself disqualified from it by trashing a hotel room. As a final chance, Hane and Primevera challenge Aoi to beat Reiji in playing all three movements of the Kreutzer if he is to continue performing. Aoi's bow flies out of his hand in the third movement. Then, he promises to never play the violin again.
| 6 | August 9, 2001 | 978-4-253-07842-9 | July 4, 2007 | 978-1-401-21073-1 |
Opus 23. Rain Song; Opus 24. We Are All Alone; Opus 25. The Night That Had To Come; Opus 26. Goodbye, Sensei; Opus 27. The Song of the Cross-Spider
Reiji refuses to perform for Hakuto's biggest sponsor when the sponsor criticises Aoi and Nachi. Reiji performs Brahms's Rain Song (Violin sonata #1 in G major) in the third round of the contest, coming fourth. Reiji chooses Berg's Concerto for the final round of the concert. Due to a lack of concentration, Reiji visits Aoi, who has taken up gardening. Reiji goes to Hakuto's biggest sponsor and at Bartholomew's challenge, performs Mozart's Concerto. In order to write a report on the image of death in Christianity, Reiji visits a church, where he sees Bartholomew, who reveals his plans to orchestrate an operational take-over of the New York Philharmonic, inviting Reiji to join him. After listening to Bartholomew conduct in a church, Reiji's step-mother attempts to kill him in order to see Miruka. Bartholomew stops the attack but it is revealed that Bartholomew and Reiji are father and son. In a daze, Reiji's violin gets run over by a car. Ha later burns it as a "two hundred thousand dollar pile of kindling". Bartholomew refuses to acknowledge Reiji as his son. Meanwhile, Reiji attempts suicide but is stopped by Hane, who soon faints and falls into a river afterwards. Bartholomew saves both of them and takes them both to the cabin.
| 7 | December 24, 2001 | 978-4-253-07860-3 | October 10, 2007 | 978-1-401-21074-8 |
Opus 28.
