= Planet Ladder =

Japanese manga series by Yuri Narushima

- Cover of the first volume as published in North America by Tokyopop on April 23, 2002

プラネット·ラダー (Puranetto Radā)
- Genre: Fantasy; Science fiction
- Manga
- Written by: Yuri Narushima
- Published by: Sobisha/Shueisha
- English publisher: NA: Tokyopop (former)
- Magazine: Crimson
- English magazine: NA: Smile
- Original run: March 1998 – May 2003
- Volumes: 7

Planet Ladder (Japanese: プラネット·ラダー, Hepburn: Puranetto Radā) is a Japanese manga series written and illustrated by Yuri Narushima. Appearing as a serial in the shōjo (targeted towards girls) manga magazine Crimson from the March 1998 issue to the May 2003 issue, the chapters of Planet Ladder were published by Sobisha/Shueisha in seven tankōbon volumes from December 1998 to May 2004. Based on the Japanese folktale The Tale of the Bamboo Cutter in which a girl is discovered to be the princess of the moon, the story focuses on a teenager named Kaguya, who is prophesied to save only one of the nine parallel worlds, and her quest to bring peace to a warring universe while finding her true identity.

Planet Ladder was licensed for an English-language translation in North America by Tokyopop, and released from April 2002 to March 2005 after being serialized in Tokyopop's manga anthology Smile. Planet Ladder was part of Tokyopop's line-up of manga in its original right-to-left format; previously, the majority of manga licensed in the United States was "flopped" to read left-to-right for a Western audience. Planet Ladder was positively received by English-language readers, with two volumes placing in ICv2's list of best-selling graphic novels. The series received generally positive reviews from English-language critics. On April 2, 2007, it went out of print in North America.

== Plot ==
The series focuses on Kaguya Haruyama, a teenager who has lived with a Japanese foster family since she was found as an abandoned, amnesiac four-year-old. One night, two men—Idou, a monk, and Seeu, an emotionless prince—appear in her home and fight over her. Gold, Seeu's robot modeled after Kaguya's deceased brother Kagami, brings her to a world parallel to Earth on Seeu's orders. After exploring the world with Gold, she encounters Shiina Mol Bamvivrie who believes Kaguya is the "Girl of Ananai", destined to save only one of the nine parallel worlds from collision. Shiina explains that nine worlds exist: Ancient, the first civilized world that was mysteriously destroyed; Asu, Seeu's disintegrated world; Eden, present-day Earth; Telene, a small world allied with Geo; Fifth World, a politically neutral world; Geus, a peaceful world under the control of Geo; Geo, the most powerful of the worlds; Asuraitsu, Geo's rival; and the Ninth World, destroyed before the start of the series.

Shiina and Waseda, a Tokyo University student trapped in the body of a giant rooster, join her and Gold in traveling across Telene. After learning that Seeu watched his people die from an incurable virus spread around Asu, Kaguya decides to change the fate of the worlds by confronting Kura, Geo's indulgent emperor who ordered her kidnapping. Instead, while en route to Geo, Gold brings her to Seeu's floating castle in Asu and Kura captures and recruits Shiina into his army.

Kaguya later makes an interplanetary broadcast, announcing her refusal to save only one world. Instead, she plans to find a person to help her save most of the worlds and people. Kura begins to destroy other worlds to increase Geo's survival chances. Deciding to use Kaguya as a political figurehead, Kura sends Shiina to abduct her; once there, Kaguya refuses to help him. Angered, Kura divulges that the "Girl of Ananai" legend is a myth elaborated on and spread around by him and Kagami. After a brief battle with Shiina, Seeu arrives to rescue Kaguya and she realizes her love for him. Transforming into a dragon, Gold teleports everyone to Ancient; there Idou, Seeu, Kura, and Shiina are persuaded to combine their magical weapons with Gold to fix the rift in the universe, the cause of the eventual collision between the worlds. The series ends with an epilogue seven years later; Kaguya explains the fate of everyone and meets Seeu and their young son with a picnic basket.

== Production ==
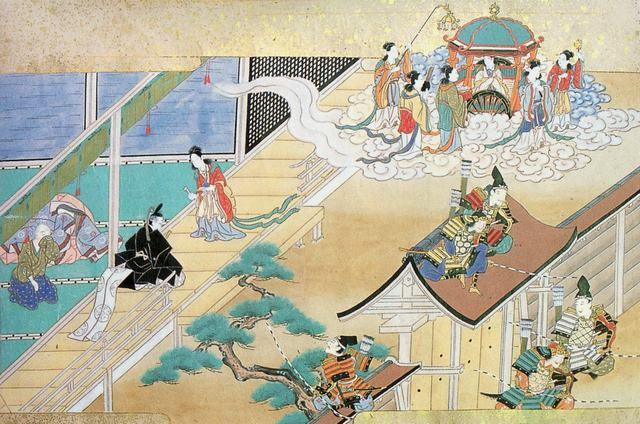
Planet Ladder is based on the Japanese folktale The Tale of the Bamboo Cutter.

According to manga artist Yuri Narushima, she began the manga with "a dramatic feeling in mind" and wanted to "start off with a comic book for young girls (shōjo manga)." Narushima planned to have the plot progress quickly so the reader remembers the events and can "'digest' the foreshadowed events". Planet Ladder was based on the Japanese folktale The Tale of the Bamboo Cutter, which focuses on a girl named Kaguya-Hime who is discovered to be the princess of the moon. Additionally, the protagonist takes her name from the folktale.

After discovering that a North American version of Planet Ladder was being simultaneously released, Narushima designed the cover of volume 6 to be "export friendly", describing it as "like Japanese style, but slightly off". Additionally, she considered serializing Planet Ladder in another magazine, but decided against it since the series was close to ending.

== Release ==
Written and illustrated by Yuri Narushima, Planet Ladder appeared as a serial in the Japanese manga magazine Crimson from the March 1998 issue to the May 2003 issue. Sobisha/Shueisha later published the chapters in seven tankōbon volumes from December 1998 to May 2004. Shueisha re-released Planet Ladder in four bunkoban volumes from July 18, to August 8, 2008.

Tokyopop licensed Planet Ladder for an English-language release in North America and serialized it in its manga magazine Smile. The first volume was released on April 23, 2002; the final volume was published on March 8, 2005. Planet Ladder belonged to Tokyopop's line-up of manga in its original right-to-left format; previously, the majority of manga licensed in the United States was "flopped" to read left-to-right for a Western audience. As a result, it was displayed in a case with the eight other "unflopped" manga—Chobits, Dragon Knights, Marmalade Boy, GTO, Real Bout High School, The Skull Man, Mars and Cowboy Bebop—and heavily advertised in anime magazines and on fan sites. Planet Ladder went out of print on April 2, 2007, in North America.

Only the last two volumes were given titles in the English-language release: The Fate of the Dark Planet for volume six and Ananai of the Puzzled Star for the seventh volume.

Digital Manga Publishing re-released the series for North America digitally in 2012, and is the current license holder.

=== Volume list ===
No.	Original release date	Original ISBN	English release date	English ISBN
01	December 18, 1998	978-4-420-17002-4	April 23, 2002	1-931514-62-3
02	August 25, 1999	978-4-420-17010-9	July 23, 2002	1-931514-63-1
03	June 23, 2000	978-4-420-17019-2	October 22, 2002	1-931514-64-X
04	June 25, 2001	978-4-420-17031-4	December 10, 2002	1-59182-063-4
05	September 25, 2002	978-4-420-17044-4	March 11, 2003	1-59182-199-1
06	July 25, 2003	978-4-420-17051-2	February 10, 2004	1-59182-507-5
07	May 25, 2004	978-4-420-17057-4	March 8, 2005	1-59182-508-3

== Reception ==
Planet Ladder was positively received by English-language readers. The fifth volume placed in the 44th spot on the list of the 50 best-selling graphic novels of February 2003, with an estimated 1,176 copies sold. The sixth volume reached the 71st place on the list of the 100 best-selling graphic novels of February 2004, with an estimated 984 copies sold.

Critical reaction to Planet Ladder was generally positive. In Manga: The Complete Guide, Jason Thompson wrote that the manga reminded him of "prose science fiction", citing A Wrinkle in Time by Madeleine L'Engle (1962) and Nine Princes in Amber by Roger Zelazny (1970) as examples. His criticism of the series centered on Narushima's "inconsistent designs, crude faces, and too much greasy looking screentone". While stating that Planet Ladder is a "difficult title to warm to, since it feels like we're in the middle of the story, rather than the beginning", Mike Dungan of Mania Entertainment considered the effort "worthy", and wrote that it made Kaguya more sympathetic at the cost of the other characters. Dungan enjoyed the "pleasant though not especially unique" art, the "attractively designed and well-drawn" characters, the occasional humor, and the overall adaptation, especially the "natural sounding dialogue". However, he criticized Tokyopop's inconsistent handling of the sound effects. Sequential Tart's Sheena McNeil praised the plot as original and noted elements from fairytales and fantasy in the series. In follow-up reviews, she praised the manga as "turning out to be one of the best fantasy manga out there; it stands apart from the rest with its uniqueness" but expressed her surprise that Sheena's name changed to Shiina halfway through the series with no explanation.
