= List of Mars chapters =

Cover of the first tankōbon volume of Mars, published in Japan by Kodansha on May 13, 1996

The chapters of the Japanese manga series Mars were written and illustrated by Fuyumi Soryo. The series premiered in Bessatsu Friend in 1996, where it ran until its conclusion in 2000. The chapters were collected and published in 15 tankōbon volumes by Kodansha. The first volume was published on May 13, 1996; the last on December 13, 2000. A short prequel series, Mars: A Horse With No Name, was serialized in the same magazine in 1999, and its chapters were published in a single tankōbon volume on December 9, 1999. From October 12, 2006, through January 12, 2007, Kodansha republished the series in Japan across eight kanzenban special edition volumes, collecting more chapters in each volume.

The manga series was licensed for an English language release in North America by Tokyopop. The first five chapters were serialized in Smile starting in the October 2001 issue, and running until the March 2001 issue. which published all fifteen volumes from April 23, 2003, through November 11, 2003. It released A Horse With No Name on July 13, 2004. Both titles are now considered "out of print" by Tokyopop.

== Volume list ==
=== Mars ===
No.	Original release date	Original ISBN	North America release date	North America ISBN
1	May 13, 1996	978-4-06-303030-3	April 23, 2003	978-1-931514-58-3
2	September 13, 1996	978-4-06-303041-9	June 25, 2002	978-1-931514-59-0
3	January 13, 1997	978-4-06-303054-9	August 20, 2002	978-1-59182-054-3
4	May 13, 1997	978-4-06-303065-5	September 24, 2002	978-1-59182-055-0
5	September 12, 1997	978-4-06-303076-1	October 22, 2002	978-1-59182-056-7
6	January 13, 1998	978-4-06-303095-2	November 19, 2002	978-1-59182-057-4
7	May 13, 1998	978-4-06-303106-5	December 10, 2002	978-1-59182-072-7
8	September 11, 1998	978-4-06-303126-3	January 7, 2003	978-1-59182-087-1
9	January 12, 1999	978-4-06-303140-9	March 11, 2003	978-1-59182-105-2
10	May 13, 1999	978-4-06-303153-9	May 13, 2003	978-1-59182-129-8
11	September 13, 1999	978-4-06-303166-9	June 17, 2003	978-1-59182-130-4
12	February 10, 2000	978-4-06-303181-2	July 15, 2003	978-1-59182-131-1
13	July 13, 2000	978-4-06-303199-7	August 12, 2003	978-1-59182-132-8
14	October 13, 2000	978-4-06-341208-6	September 16, 2003	978-1-59182-133-5
15	December 13, 2000	978-4-06-341217-8	November 11, 2003	978-1-59182-134-2

=== Mars: Horse With No Name ===
No.	Original release date	Original ISBN	North America release date	North America ISBN
1	December 9, 1999	978-4-06-303178-2	July 13, 2004	978-1-59182-864-8
"A Horse with No Name" (Namae no nai Uma); "Sleeping Lion" (Nemuru Raion); "1-Karat Gem" (1 Karatto no Kajitsu)
