= Tears of a Lamb =

Japanese manga series

ひつじの涙 (Hitsuji no Namida)
- Genre: Romantic comedy
- Manga
- Written by: Banri Hidaka
- Published by: Hakusensha
- English publisher: NA: CMX
- Magazine: Hana to Yume
- Original run: September 5, 2001 – November 5, 2003
- Volumes: 7

Tears of A Lamb (ひつじの涙, Hitsuji no Namida) is a Japanese manga series written and illustrated by Banri Hidaka. It was originally serialized in Hana to Yume in 2001, with the individual chapters collected and published in seven tankōbon volumes by Hakusensha. The story focuses on Kei Hasumi, an anorexic teenager girl in love with her brother's friend Kakeru Suwa, who lost his memory. Kei searches for the ring he'd given his girlfriend to try to help him recover his memory. She is aided by Kyosuke Kanzaki, a classmate who is in love with her, who lives in an apartment where Kei believes the ring may be.

It is licensed for English language release in North America by CMX, which released the first volume in January 2008.

== Media ==
=== Manga ===
Written and illustrated by Banri Hidaka, Tears of a Lamb premiered in the 19th issue of Hana to Yume in 2001, where it ran until its conclusion in the 23rd issue 2003. The forty-two unnamed chapters were collected and published in seven tankōbon by Hakusensha from April 2002 until March 2004. The series is licensed for English-language release in North America by CMX Manga, which released the first volume in January 2008.

==== Volume list ====
No.	Original release date	Original ISBN	English release date	English ISBN
1	April 19, 2002	4592175824	January 1, 2008	9781401215194
Chapters 1–6
2	August 19, 2002	4592175832	January 1, 2008	9781401215200
Chapters 7-12
3	December 16, 2002	4592175840	August 5, 2008	9781401215217
Chapters 13–18
4	May 19, 2003	4592175859	November 18, 2008	9781401215224
Chapters 19–24
5	August 19, 2003	4592175867	March 24, 2009	9781401215231
Chapters 25-30
6	December 16, 2003	4592175875	August 11, 2009	9781401215248
Chapters 31-35
7	March 19, 2004	4592175883	January 12, 2010	9781401215255
Chapters 37-42

=== Drama CD ===
Two drama CDs from the series were released non-commercially for the series. The first was released with the 4th issue of Hana to Yume in 2004, as a promotional item which contained tracks for other series from the magazine as well. The second was available only via mail-in and contained a booklet with the character introduction and comments of the author regarding the characters. There is also a scenario booklet that contains the script of the tracks in the CD. Both CDs featured the voices of Yukari Tamura as Kei Hasumi and Kentarō Itō as Kyosuke Kanzaki.

=== Illustration collection ===
A joint illustrated collection of Banri Hidaka's 2 works, Sekai de Ichiban Daikirai and Tears of a Lamb was released on March 17, 2004.

== Reception ==
Pop Culture Shock's Katherine Dacey criticises the manga, saying, "Comedic moments bump up against revelations of anorexia, broken homes, and broken engagements, making for a very choppy read. The few scenes in which characters break the fourth wall to crack jokes are especially distracting, coming on the heels of serious revelations about Hasumi's mental health." Pop Culture Shock's Michelle Smith commends the manga for "Kanzaki's consideration of Kei is shown through his actions rather than told in mere words. The best scenes are when they are engaged in heartfelt conversation" as well as its cute art, saying, "I love the fleecy lambs sprinkled throughout". However, she criticises the manga for "the continual reliance on violence as a source of humor." In a review of volume one, Clara Yamasaka wrote in Newtype USA "Later volumes may bring more insight into the troubles that have damaged these two teens' psyches, but if you have real world troubles of your own, you might feel more like slapping these characters upside the head instead of reading subsequent volumes." Jason Thompson described the author's manga in general as being "basically romantic character sketches", noting that the major difference in Tears of a Lamb was that it started "disorientedly in the middle of things". He found the problems faced by the characters seemed "merely gimmicky".
