= Kusakawa =

Kusakawa (written: 草川 lit. "grass river") is a Japanese surname. Notable people with the surname include:

- Keizō Kusakawa (草川 啓造), Japanese animation director
- Nari Kusakawa (草川 為), Japanese manga artist
