= CMX (comics) =

Former publishing imprint of DC Comics

- Parent company: DC Comics (Warner Bros. Entertainment)
- Founded: 2004
- Defunct: July 1, 2010
- Country of origin: U.S.
- Headquarters location: New York City, New York
- Publication types: Comics
- Fiction genres: Manga
- Official website: dccomics.com/cmx/

CMX was an imprint of DC Comics, a division of Warner Bros. Entertainment. It was DC's line of manga translations. CMX was known for its censored release of Tenjho Tenge and the print version of Fred Gallagher's Megatokyo web manga series.

== Controversy ==
One of CMX's initial launches was a title variously known as Tenjo Tenge, Tenjho Tenge, and Ten Ten. When CMX released Tenjho Tenge, many fans were livid that title had been edited contentwise and changed graphically to appeal to a "larger demographic"—in other words, edited to be acceptable to bookstores without shrinkwrap. Tenjho Tenge and CMX received a heavy amount of angry backlash for the edits.

CMX's announcement that all changes had been overseen and specifically approved by Ito Ōgure, the manga artist, did nothing to appease the vocal fans who did not want the work censored. Some readers suggested a boycott of all CMX titles.

In the face of complaints, CMX had internal discussions about the possibility of publishing an unedited version of Tenjho Tenge, but decided to complete the current version. At the 2007 Anime Expo, CMX stated about changing Tenjho Tenge's rating to Mature beginning with volume fifteen, but warned that it still would be edited, but more lightly.

DC Comics released a statement in May 2010 about its intention to shut the CMX brand down, with no new titles being published after July 1. At the time of its statement, DC could not state what would happen to all current unfinished volumes affected by the July 1 shutdown date. Megatokyo however continued under the DC Comics imprint.

Since CMX's discontinuation, some licenses have gone to other English publishers; for example, Megatokyo by 2013 returned to Dark Horse Comics and Tenjho Tenge went to Viz Media.

== List of manga titles formerly licensed by CMX ==
=== Published titles ===
Title	Author(s)	Japanese publisher(s)	Current English licensee(s)	Note(s)
Apothecarius Argentum	Tomomi Yamashita	Akita Shoten	None	Volumes 1–8 only. Volume 9 was cancelled due to CMX's closure.
Astral Project	Marginal (story); Syuji Takeya (art)	Enterbrain	None	
Ballad of a Shinigami	K-Ske Hasegawa (original writer); Asuka Izumi (art)	Hakusensha	None	Manga adaptation of K-Ske Hasegawa's light novel series of the same name.
The Battle of Genryu: Origin	Shouko Fukaki	Flex Comix	None	Volumes 1–2 only. Volume 3 was cancelled due to CMX's closure.
Broken Blade	Yunosuke Yoshinaga	Flex Comix	None	Volumes 1–3 only. Volume 4 was cancelled due to CMX's closure.
Canon	Chika Shiomi	Akita Shoten	None	
Chikyu Misaki	Yūji Iwahara	Kadokawa Shoten	None	
Cipher	Minako Narita	Hakusensha	None	
Crayon Shin-chan	Yoshito Usui	Futabasha	One Peace Books	Volumes 1–11 only. Volume 12 was cancelled due to CMX's closure. License acquired by One Peace Books.
Classical Medley	Sanae Kana	SB Creative; Flex Comix	None	
Deka Kyōshi	Tamio Baba	Flex Comix	None	Volumes 1–2 only. Volume 3 was cancelled due to CMX's closure.
Densha Otoko: The Story of the Train Man Who Fell in Love With A Girl	Nakano Hitori (original writer); Wataru Watanabe (art)	Akita Shoten	None	Manga adaptation of Nakano Hitori's 2004 novel of the same name.
The Devil Does Exist	Mitsuba Takanashi	Shueisha	None	
Diamond Girl	Takanori Yamazaki	Flex Comix	None	Volume 1 Only. Volume 2 was cancelled due CMX's closure.
Dokkoida?!	Taro Achi (story); Yu Yagami (art)	MediaWorks	None	Manga adaptation of Taro Achi's light novel series of the same name.
Dorothea	Cuvie	Fujimi Shobo	None	
Emma	Kaoru Mori		Yen Press	
The Empty Empire	Naoe Kita		None	
Fire Investigator Nanase	Izo Hashimoto (story); Tomoshige Ichikawa (art)		None	
The Flat Earth Exchange	Toshimi Nigoshi		None	
From Eroica with Love	Yasuko Aoike		None	
Gals!	Mihona Fujii		None	
Genghis Khan: To the Ends of the Earth and Sea	Seiichi Morimura (original writer); Nakaba Higurashi (art)		None	Manga adaptation of the 2007 film adaptation of Seiichi Morimura's 2000 novel of the same name.
The Girl Who Runs Through Time	Yasutaka Tsutsui (original writer); Gaku Tsugano (art)		None	Manga adaptation of Yasutaka Tsutsui's 1967 novel The Girl Who Leapt Through Time.
Go Go Heaven!!	Keiko Yamada		None	
Go West!	Yu Yagami		None	
Gon	Masashi Tanaka		Kodansha USA	
I Hate You More than Anyone	Banri Hidaka		None	
Jihai	Toshimi Nigoshi		None	
The Key to the Kingdom	Kyoko Shitou		None	
Kiichi and the Magic Books	Taka Amano		None	
Kikaider Code 02	Shotaro Ishinomori (original creator); Meimu (story and art)		None	
King of Cards	Makoto Tateno		None	
King of Debris	Yusuke Aso		None	
Land of the Blindfolded	Sakura Tsukuba		None	
The Lapis Lazuli Crown	Natsuna Kawase		None	
Leader's High!	Arashi Shindo		None	
The Lizard Prince	Asuka Izumi		None	
Madara	Eiji Ōtsuka (story); Shou Tajima (art)		None	
March on Earth	Mikase Hayashi		None	
Monster Collection	Hitoshi Yasuda (original concept); Sei Itoh (story and art)		None	Based on the Monster Collection card game by Group SNE.
Moon Child	Reiko Shimizu		None	
Musashi Number Nine	Miyuki Takanashi		None	
My Darling! Miss Bancho	Mayu Fujikata		None	
The Name of the Flower	Ken Saitou		None	
Oh! My Brother	Ken Saitou		None	
Omukae desu	Meca Tanaka		None	
Orfina	Kitsune Tennōji		None	
Oyayubi-hime Infinity	Toru Fujieda		None	
Palette of 12 Secret Colors	Nari Kusakawa		None	
Penguin Revolution	Sakura Tsukuba		None	
Phantom Thief Jeanne	Arina Tanemura		Viz Media	
Pieces of a Spiral	Kaim Tachibana		None	
Polyphonica: Cardinal Crimson	Ichirō Sakaki (original writer); Tomo Hirokawa (art)		None	Manga adaptation of the Polyphonica Crimson light novels by Ichirō Sakaki.
Presents	Kanako Inuki		None	
Rampage	Yunosuke Yoshinaga		None	
The Recipe for Gertrude	Nari Kusakawa		None	
Samurai Commando: Mission 1549	Harutoshi Fukui (story); Ark Performance (art); Ryo Hanmura (original concept)		None	
Seimaden	You Higuri		None	
Shirley	Kaoru Mori		None	
Steel Fist Riku	Jyutaroh Nishino		None	
Stolen Hearts	Miku Sakamoto		None	
Suihelibe!	Naomi Azuma		None	
Swan	Kyoko Ariyoshi		None	
Sword of the Dark Ones	Kentaro Yasui (story); Tsukasa Kotobuki (art)		None	
A Tale of an Unknown Country	Natsuna Kawase		None	
Tears of a Lamb	Banri Hidaka		None	
Tenjho Tenge	Oh! great		Viz Media	
TenRyu: The Dragon Cycle	Sanami Matoh		None	
Teru Teru X Shonen	Shigeru Takao		None	
Testarotho	Kei Sanbe		None	
Time Guardian	Daimuro Kishi (story); Tamao Ichinose (art)		None	
Tower of the Future	Saki Hiwatari		None	
Two Flowers for the Dragon	Nari Kusakawa		None	
Variante	Igura Sugimoto		None	
Venus Capriccio	Mai Nishikata		None	
Venus in Love	Yuki Nakaji		None	
VS	Keiko Yamada		None	
The Young Magician	Yuri Narushima		None	
Zombie Fairy	Dasuke Torii		None	

=== English-language manga ===
Title	Author(s)	Current publisher(s)	Note(s)
Megatokyo	Fred Gallagher	Dark Horse Comics	Volumes 4–5 only.

=== Cancelled titles ===
Title	Author(s)	Current English licensee(s)	Note(s)
51 Ways to Save Her	Usamaru Furuya	None	
Nadeshiko Club	Miku Sakamoto	None	
Nyan Koi!	Sato Fujiwara	None	
The Phantom Guesthouse	Nari Kusakawa	None	
Shisso Holiday	Otsuichi (original writer); Hiro Kiyohara (art)	None	Based on the novel of the same by Otsuichi.
Tableau Gate	Rika Suzuki	None	
