= The Recipe for Gertrude =

Japanese manga series

ガートルードのレシピ (Gātorūdo no Reshipi)
- Genre: Romance, Supernatural
- Manga
- Written by: Nari Kusakawa
- Published by: Hakusensha
- English publisher: CMX Manga
- Magazine: LaLa
- Original run: 2001 – 2003
- Volumes: 5

The Recipe for Gertrude (ガートルードのレシピ, Gātorūdo no Reshipi) is a 5-volume serialization that ran in LaLa starting in 2001. The manga is written by Nari Kusakawa. The North American serialization is available through CMX Manga (DC Comics).

== Plot ==
From CMX Manga: Sahara is a normal high-school girl whose life is turned upside down when she meets "Gertrude," a 100-year-old demon who looks like a teenaged boy. Gertrude is a man-made demon, constructed from the parts of various other demons and brought to life through a "recipe" from an ancient spell book.

Gertrude searches for the recipe in order to learn more about his origin, and wants to destroy the formula so that it can never be repeated. Sahara becomes a resourceful ally in Gertrude's quest, and they are aided by some very comical and not-very-threatening demons.

== Characters ==
Gertrude
Is a man-made demon constructed by Claude. He was assembled using choice parts of demons that Claude stole or found. Since his parts are not his own, he spends life on the run from various demons wanting their respective parts back. Gertrude is looking for the recipe for his own creation in order to prevent further cases like his own, to learn more about himself, and also so that demons will stop trying to track him down.
He becomes more powerful during full moons, but has tended to avoid taking advantage of this as it will make him more violent. During these times, his usually silver hair will turn black due to the "evil aura." He was persuaded to use his power by Sahara during a fight when it seemed they would be unable to defeat Curtis. Previously, Gertrude worried he would lose the only part that's his, his consciousness, if he were to use this ability.
It is hinted by Puppen that Gertrude has been known to make human friends every so often, but that they don't last. Sahara's friendship is the first that lasted this long, and the first case where's he stayed in one place. He falls in love with her.
Gertrude has the ability to use anything he can assert power over by writing "Frailty, thy name is (object's name)" with his own blood; as summarised by Puppen and Marriotte, this ability is basically telling an object, "You are weak, so you'll do what I'll tell you to do".
Sahara Susugi
Sahara met Gertrude while visiting an abandoned house. She is usually calm and level-headed, and often helpful. She visits the house daily to see her friends Gertrude, Puppen, and Marriotte.
When the blank pages of the recipe react to her, Curtis suspects Sahara has some connection to the missing recipe, which she denies. It later turns out the recipe has been grafted onto her bones without her knowledge. Sahara falls in love with Gertrude.
Puppen and Marriotte
During Gertrude's construction, an ear was taken each from Puppen and Marriotte. The story begins with the two's attempt to steal them back. They lost, and now keep Gertrude company living in his house. They have the ability to take human form, or take on the bodies of inanimate objects. They frequently tease Gertrude about his not qualifying to be a proper demon; however, after a little while living with Gertrude himself, they act more like regular humans than they do demons.
Kyusaku Susugi
Kyusaku is Sahara older brother. When Gertrude first sees Kyusaku, he thought that he saw Claude in him. In volume 2, he kidnapped Sahara to keep Gertrude from the recipe as it is grafted onto her bones. However, Sahara escapes with the help from Gertrude who realizes that Kyusaku, Sahara older brother is in fact Claude. It is revealed that when Sahara's parents visit England, the real Kyusaku died when he was seven. That is when Claude took over his body. Although Sahara finds out he is actually Claude, she still deeply cares for him as her older brother despite they are not related. Claude in some twisted way cares for Sahara as his little sister as well. This is shown in volume 3 when he didn't even hesitate to protect her from a fallen flower pot. Later on, we find out that Claude was married to Halon and that Gertrude's body was made from Halon's twin sister Gertrude who he was named after. However, the experiment became a mess when Gertrude (Halon twin sister) takes her and Halon soul and put it into Gertrude body causing the three souls to share one body. Claude struggles to free Halon's soul from Gertrude, but it is too late as her soul merges with Gertrude and they become one while Halon's twin sister becomes evil. At the end Gertrude saves Claude from dying. Though Claude is left with many scars he still lives and Sahara forgives him for everything.
Halon
Halon was the wife of Claude. She was half-demon, half-human and the twin sister of Gertrude. She was the opposite of her sister and was unselfish, caring and kind. She was killed when her sister placed her soul into Gertrude's body. Halon is the main reason why Claude continues to experiment in hopes of separating her soul from Gertrude the man-made demon.
Gertrude (Halon's Twin Sister)
Gertrude was the sister of Halon. She was greedy and always wanting more. She was the evil in Gertrude the man-made demon. Being a half-demon, she would cough up blood every day and would be severely hurt whenever she tried to use her magic. She fell in love with Claude, but Claude did not return her feeling because he loved Halon. She became jealous of her sister and requested that Claude create a full demon body for her. She is the cause of her sister's death and for that Claude no longer cares for her. As shown when her corpse was injured fighting Curtis.

== Reception ==
Carl Kimlinger enjoyed the relationship between the main characters.
