= Canon (manga) =

Japanese manga

- Cover of Canon volume 1 as published by CMX Manga.

カノン (Kanon)
- Genre: Horror, romance
- Manga
- Written by: Chika Shiomi
- Published by: Akita Shoten
- English publisher: NA: CMX Manga
- Magazine: Mystery EX
- Original run: 1994 – 1996
- Volumes: 4

Canon (Japanese: カノン, Hepburn: Kanon) is a Japanese shōjo manga by Chika Shiomi (who also wrote the manga series Yurara and Yukarism). The series was originally serialized between 1994 and 1996 in Akita Shoten's manga magazine Mystery EX, and the chapters were compiled into four bound volumes. The series has been licensed by CMX Manga and has released all four volumes in English.

== Plot ==
A vampire attacks a high school and kills thirty-nine students, leaving one "alive" — Canon Himuro — for some reason as a vampire. After the incident, she lives on having a grudge against this vampire, the only memories of him are his blond hair and blue eyes. To suppress her blood-drinking instincts, she wears a crucifix given to her by an American some years ago.

One day, she met a Japanese half-vampire - his father a vampire, his mother a human — named Sakaki who later reveals himself to be the vampire responsible for the deaths of Canon's friends as well as her return from the undead. Sakaki is a boy who had a grudge against a blond vampire named Rod. Sakaki is very powerful and has the power to change people's memory, which is what he has done to Canon. After some incidents happen, Canon and Sakaki fall in love.

== Characters ==
Canon Himuro (氷室 かのん, Himuro Kanon)
A girl who had an incurable disease that disappeared when she became a vampire. After learning that Rod is not the one who killed her friends, her next intention is to kill Sakaki. She falls in love with Sakaki.
Sakaki (榊)
A boy who is a Japanese half vampire. He has a grudge against Rod because Rod killed his family. He wanted to use Canon as his servant, but he can't and in the end, he fell in love with her.
Fui (風威, Fūi)
A bird vampire who was left by its master and met Canon. Canon loves him so much and that Canon's grudge against Sakaki was mostly because Fui was nearly killed by him.
Rod (ロッド, Roddo)
A vampire who is a candidate to be the leader of the vampire tribe. He was actually protecting Canon instead of hurting her. He met Canon when he was killing Sakaki's family and Canon was still a little girl and still sick.
Machua
A girl vampire who failed to kill Sakaki. Canon helped her and then they became friends.
Glenn
A male vampire who is a friend of Rod. He came to kill Sakaki and became the biggest enemy of all.
