= Two Flowers for the Dragon =

Japanese manga series

- Two Flowers for The Dragon

龍の花わずらい (Ryū no Hanawazurai)
- Genre: Fantasy, romance
- Manga
- Written by: Nari Kusakawa
- Published by: Hakusensha
- English publisher: NA: CMX
- Magazine: LaLa
- Original run: May 2005 – July 2009
- Volumes: 7

Ryū no Hanawazurai (龍の花わずらい), also known as Two Flowers for the Dragon, is a Japanese shōjo manga authored by Nari Kusakawa. The manga series was serialized in Hakusensha's monthly shōjo manga magazine, LaLa and ended in the July issue of 2009. Seven collected volumes were published under the Hana to Yume Comics imprint. CMX published six volumes in North America before July 2010, when DC Comics dissolved the CMX Manga imprint.

The last volume of the manga sold 32,366 copies in the first week of release in Japan and was ranked 21st. The first two volumes of the manga has been named as Great Graphic Novels for Teens by the Young Adult Library Services Association.

== Overview ==
Shakuya, princess of the Dragon Tribe, can turn into a dragon, and has two fiancé. One fiancé is Lucien, who was missing for a long time, now returns. The other is Kuwan, the captain of the guardians in the village, who she loves more. She has two tattoos on her arms; a rose for Lucien, and a Bellflower for Kuwan. These flowers grow as her affection for them grows. The story is about their three-way love. Even though Shakuya is in love with Kuwan, Lucien is determined to change the mind of his beloved Shakuya.

== Characters ==
Shakuya
The daughter of the Queen of the Dragon Tribe. She has the ability to transform into a dragon. She is very energetic, which annoys her fiancé Kuwan to no end. She loves Kuwan more, but it is shown when she is young to have loved Lucien very deeply. She has a tendency to end up in some compromising scenes.
Kuwan
The captain of the guardians, also Shakuya's fiancé. He tends to act cold and distant, which Shakuya has mentioned. He is the 'replacement' fiancé that was put in the place of the then-lost Lucien. He doesn't like Shakuya's ventures out of the castle, and often does not listen to her when she explains why she is out (which is usually to see him).
Lucien
The missing fiancé of Shakuya. After many years, he returns and causes some problems for Shakuya and the rest of the Dragon Tribe. He likes to, when talking to Shakuya, end his dialogues in some sort of seductive act. According to author, his name comes from Chū Shin Chi, the Japanese name of actor Stephen Chow Sing-Chi.

== Volume list ==
No.	Original release date	Original ISBN	North America release date	North America ISBN
1	January 5, 2006	978-4-592-183334	June 3, 2008	978-1401215262
Chapter 1; Chapter 2; Chapter 3; Chapter 4; Back-up Story: An Anecdote of the Dragon; Kusakawa Notes
2	May 2, 2006	978-4-592-183341	August 12, 2008	978-1401215279
Chapter 5; Chapter 6; Chapter 7; Chapter 8; Chapter 9; "The Cogwheeler"; Kusakawa Notes
3	February 5, 2007	978-4-592-183358	December 9, 2008	978-1401219055
Chapter 10; Chapter 11; Chapter 12; Chapter 13; Chapter 14; Side Story: Double Crown
4	August 4, 2007	978-4-592-183365	May 12, 2009	978-1401219062
5	May 2, 2008	978-4-592-183372	October 27, 2009	978-1401222260
6	March 5, 2009	978-4-592-183389	June 29, 2010	978-1401226107
7	August 5, 2009	978-4-592-183396		

== Reception ==
Jason Thompson praised Shakuya's self-assuredness, and appreciated the age-appropriate level of fanservice in the manga.
