= Classical Medley =

Japanese manga series

- First English edition of Classical Medley

クラシカルメドレー (Kurashikaru Medorē)
- Genre: Adventure, fantasy
- Manga
- Written by: Sanae Kana
- Published by: Softbank
- English publisher: NA: CMX
- Magazine: Gekkan Shōnen Blood, Flex Comix Blood
- Original run: 2006 – 2007
- Volumes: 2

Classical Medley (クラシカルメドレー, Kurashikaru Medorē) is a Japanese manga series written and illustrated by Sanae Kana. It is published in Japan by Softbank.

The series is licensed for an English language release in North America by CMX.

== Manga ==
No.	Original release date	Original ISBN	North America release date	North America ISBN
1	January 12, 2007	978-4-79-733808-9	October 28, 2008	978-1-40-121898-0
2	July 12, 2007	978-4-79-734314-4	January 20, 2009	978-1-40-121899-7

== Reception ==
Ed Sizemore of Comics Worth Reading criticized the manga for having "no life in these drawings", though he commended the manga for its "nice sense of depth and perspective". ComicMix's Andrew Wheeler commented that the manga is more suitable for younger shōjo readers than its supposed shōnen demographic. Michelle Smith of Pop Culture Shock called the series "thoroughly mediocre".
