= Yurara =

Japanese comic

- Cover of volume 1 as published by Hakusensha

ゆららの月 (Yurara no Tsuki)
- Genre: Supernatural, Mystery
- Manga
- Written by: Chika Shiomi
- Published by: Hakusensha
- English publisher: NA: Viz Media
- Magazine: Bessatsu Hana to Yume
- Original run: 2003 – 2005
- Volumes: 5
- Manga

Rasetsu no Hana
- Written by: Chika Shiomi
- Published by: Hakusensha
- English publisher: NA: Viz Media
- Magazine: Bessatsu Hana to Yume
- Original run: 2006 – 2010
- Volumes: 9

Yurara (ゆららの月, Yurara no Tsuki) is a supernatural shōjo manga by Chika Shiomi (the manga artist of Night of the Beasts, Yukarism and Canon). It was serialized in Japan between 2003 and 2005 by Hakusensha in Bessatsu Hana to Yume and collected in five bound volumes. All five volumes have been published in English in North America by Viz Media.

The series is about a teenage girl with strong spiritual powers named Yurara who, with the aid of an ancestral guardian spirit, dispels ghosts that haunt her high school while juggling her relationships with two boys in her class who also have spiritual powers.

== Plot ==
The series follows Yurara Tsukinowa, a teenage girl who has been able to see spirits and sense what they feel since she was a child. Yurara is protected from evil spirits by a beautiful guardian spirit, the ghost of an ancestress after whom she was named; when she is in the presence of a dangerous spirit, Yurara transforms in appearance and personality to that of her guardian, though she considers herself the same person in both forms. In her guardian spirit form, Yurara has the knowledge of how to use her spiritual powers to dispel spirits and send them on to their afterlife. Her personality also becomes bolder and serious, albeit a little bit violent sometimes.

At the start of the series, when Yurara enters high school, she meets two handsome boys in her new class, Mei Tendo and Yako Hoshino. The popular Mei can use "demon fire", which is able to burn spirits, while taciturn Yako has the power to place protective barriers with water. In their presence and with the increased number of spirits attracted to the trio, Yurara finds herself transforming into her guardian form more and more often. Her guardian spirit tells the ghost of Yurara's grandfather that she can only stay with Yurara until she learns to use her powers on her own.

As the series progresses, Yurara in her normal form finds herself attracted to Mei despite being irritated by his habit of flirting with any girl he can. When Mei and Yurara begin going out, however, Yurara realizes that in her guardian form she likes Yako more—and he in turn is attracted to her guardian spirit form. Seeing that the conflict between her two selves is tearing her apart with guilt, Mei asks Yako to give up Yurara, and when Yako refuses, Mei breaks up with her. Yurara's guardian spirit realizes this only saddens Yurara more and separates herself from Yurara, then engineers a situation where Yurara must use her powers on her own to rescue a depressed Mei. Her task complete, the guardian spirit says farewell to Yurara.

== Sequel ==
Rasetsu is the completed sequel to Yurara, following the further adventures of Yako Hoshino. It has been serialized in Bessatsu Hana to Yume since 2006 and collected in 9 volumes as of September 2012. It is licensed by Viz Media, which published volumes 1 and 2 June 2009.

Yako goes to an exorcist company because he has a possessed book, and needs help. Little did he know that the person he would meet there, Rasetsu Hyuga, would look exactly like his old love, Yurara. Rasetsu will be claimed by an evil spirit and become his on her 20th birthday if she does not find true love.

== Manga ==
Yurara was written and illustrated by Chika Shiomi and was serialized by Hakusensha in the shōjo manga magazine Bessatsu Hana to Yume from 2002 to 2005. The 20 untitled chapters were collected in five tankōbon volumes. The series is licensed in North America by Viz Media and in Taiwan by Ever Glory Publishing.

No.	Original release date	Original ISBN	North America release date	North America ISBN
1	19 February 2003	4-592-17171-3	5 June 2007	978-1-4215-1350-8
2	19 September 2003	4-592-17310-4	4 September 2007	978-1-4215-1351-5
3	19 May 2004	4-592-18053-4	4 December 2007	978-1-4215-1352-2
4	18 February 2005	4-592-18054-2	4 March 2008	978-1-4215-1353-9
5	16 September 2005	4-592-18055-0	10 June 2008	978-1-4215-1354-6
