= Jihai =

Japanese manga series

JIHAI〜磁海〜 (Jihai)
- Genre: Sci-fi, Action, Adventure
- Manga
- Written by: Toshimi Nigoshi
- Published by: Enterbrain
- English publisher: NA: CMX Manga
- Magazine: Comic B's-Log
- Original run: December 2006 – February 2008
- Volumes: 3

Jihai (JIHAI〜磁海〜; lit. "Magnetic Sea") is a SF Manga series by Toshimi Nigoshi that was serialized in Comic B's-Log magazine (an Enterbrain publication) from April 2006 until January 2008. The series was collected in three tankōbon volumes. The English-language release was licensed by CMX Manga. It was published in English in 2009.

== Plot ==
In the future, mankind has installed a ring around the Earth to prevent the disasters that come with the change of the Earth's magnetic field (the pole shift). This caused the appearance of the Magnetic Sea (jihai), where no living creature can exist, and the world fell to ruin. As mankind decreased in numbers, a new race of people with artificially set life spans was created with clone technology. This is the race of the workforce 'Ravants'.

Aoi is one such Ravant who bears a mark on his chest saying '18'.

With only a little of his life span left, Aoi is searching for Arcline Cole, the enemy nation's war hero who killed his childhood friend. However, the true identity of this war hero turns out to be Dis, the person who helped Aoi and gave him a place to stay. Aoi realizes he cannot hate Dis, but his life span limit of 18 haunts him every moment. Aoi's choice will soon change the fates of the people around him, and might even alter the world.

== Characters ==
Aoi (アオイ, Aoi)
Ravant whose lifespan is set at "18". With not much time left to live, he has set out on a journey to seek revenge against Arcline, the man who killed his childhood friend, Yoshino. He has the ability to traverse the "Magnetic Sea" unharmed. This skill allows him to make very fast deliveries for the underworld as a courier. When one of his deliveries almost gets him killed, Aoi is rescued by Tristram and Disfield. He currently helps Dis to run his inn.
Dis (Disfield) (ディス（ディスフィールド）, Disu (Disufiirudo))
A straightforward, awkward man of few words. After saving Aoi, he brought him back to the inn that he has been running after the original owner died. Disfield provides food for the children at Tristram's church free of charge. He was formerly the 'Hero of Hayesgald', Arcline Cole.
Tristram (トリストラム, Torisutoramu)
May look like a long-haired lightweight, but he is actually the bishop of a church. Tristram gathers and takes care of young Ravants and children without any relatives. Though he seems always cheerful on the outside, he hides a complicated past and dark ambitions.
Shirakusa (シラクサ, Shirakusa)
Doctor. Wears loud shirts and is always easygoing, but he is definitely a skilled professional. However, there appears to be some connection between him and Arcline from his past in the Hayesgald intelligence organization. It seems he has injured his right eye in battle, as he is always depicted with his hair covering his eye. In later chapters, he wears an eye patch.
Zion (シオン, Shion)
A young boy Ravant who lives at Tristram's church. He possesses the ability to read the surface of people's minds. Due to this ability, he is occasionally wise beyond his years.
Yoshino (ヨシノ, Yoshino)
Girl Ravant who was raised together with Aoi. Lost her life in the last war because of Arcline.
Priest
The priest of a church in a Rosnian slum.
Kaede (楓, Kaede)
A young woman who helps out the priest of the Rosnian slum church.

== Terminology ==
The Magnetic Sea (磁海, Jihai)
An area that appeared with the disturbances of the magnetic field, which destroys human genes. It is impossible for normal humans to survive here for long. It has recently been spreading to other areas and divides the cities.
Ravant (レイバント, Reibanto)
A humanoid produced through cloning technology. They were developed to do manual labor instead of humans, as civilization was declining. The lifespan of a Ravant is predetermined to differentiate them from original humans and it is displayed like a tattoo on his or her chest. The average lifespan of a Ravant is 50 years. Some Ravants, like Aoi, are custom made to suit the wishes of their rich owner, and may have a different lifespan. At the time the story takes place, Ravants are no longer seen as simple clones by some, but as 'a whole new race, one without any parents'.
Pole shift
The change of the magnetic poles caused by the change of the tilt of the Earth's axis. It is believed that if this happens, the seasons and the weather will change drastically, triggering natural super-catastrophes all over the world.
Arcline Cole (アルクライン = コール, Arukurain Kooru)
Disfield's name from long ago. As a general in the Hayesgald army, he was hailed as a 'hero', but the cruel war brought terror to every country. Even though he is currently in hiding, his name is regularly cited. Recently, the countries who oppose Hayesgald have put a huge bounty on Arcline Cole's head.
Hayesgald (ヘイズガルド, Heizugarudo)
A great war nation that has invaded several countries.
Lesvalenz (レスバレンツ, Resubarenshi)
A newly-formed sovereign state in the north where humans and Ravants are treated equally. The main setting of the story, as Aoi, Dis, Tris and Shirakusa live here.
Rosnia (ロスニア, Rosunia)
Subject country of Hayesgald. The country where protagonist Aoi and his childhood friend Yoshino used to live.
The kingdom of Sahare (サハール王国, Sahaaru Ōkoku)
A kingdom in the west. It has noticed Ravants with special abilities, and early on wants to take them in as research subjects.

== Drama CDs ==
Starting in 2008, several drama CDs were released following along with the story. They were produced and distributed by Inter Communications.

- JIHAI〜磁海〜 (Released November 25, 2008)
- JIHAI〜磁海〜 Second Code (Released March 25, 2009)
- JIHAI〜磁海〜 Third World (Released August 25, 2009)
- JIHAI〜磁海〜 Another Pain (Released November 25, 2009)

In 2010, a comic movie DVD with 34 comic pages drawn by Nigoshi was released as a sequel, featuring the same main cast.

- JIHAI〜磁海〜 comic movie FRONT ZERO (Released August 25, 2010)

=== Cast ===
- Aoi: Daisuke Namikawa
- Disfield: Hiroki Yasumoto
- Tristram: Daisuke Ono
- Shirakusa: Kōji Yusa
- Zion: Yūki Kaji
- Yoshino: Kana Akutsu
- Mia: Megumi Takamoto
- James: Tōru Ōkawa
- James' private secretary: Daichi Endō
- Laile: Takashi Ōhara
- Bounty hunter: Tomoaki Maeno
- Young congress member: Yūdai Satō
- Congress member secretary: Manabu Sakamaki
- Aoi (young): Momoko Ōhara
- Tristram (young): Kanako Tōjō
- Kanan: Mitsuhiro Ichiki
- Rosse: Ayumi Shimada
- Ruby: Moemi Nakamura
- Priest: Takahiro Sakurai
- Kaede: Manami Numakura
- Krot: Yoshimasa Hosoya
- Successor priest: Hisafumi Oda
- State general: Yūichi Ishigami
- Announcer: Masahiro Okazaki
- Male customer: Hidenori Takahashi
- Female staff member: Naoko Yasuda

== Manga (volumes) ==
Jihai was serialized in Japan in comic B's-LOG magazine (an Enterbrain publication) from April 2006 until January 2008, and collected in three tankōbon volumes. The English-language release was licensed by CMX Manga in 2009.

No.	Original release date	Original ISBN	North America release date	North America ISBN
1	December 27, 2006	978-4-7577-3122-6	February 17, 2009	978-1-4012-2105-8
2	June 30, 2007	978-4-7577-3598-9	June 16, 2009	978-1-4012-2106-5
3	February 1, 2008	978-4-7577-4030-3	November 24, 2009	978-1-4012-2225-3
