= The White Mage Doesn't Want to Raise the Hero's Level =

Japanese manga series

- Cover of the first tankōbon volume

白魔術師は勇者のレベルを上げたくない (Shiro Majutsu-shi wa Yuusha no Reberu o Agetakunai)
- Genre: Isekai, romantic comedy
- Manga
- Written by: Kirie
- Published by: Flex Comix
- English publisher: NA: Seven Seas Entertainment
- Magazine: Comic Meteor
- Original run: 16 December 2020 – 25 January 2023
- Volumes: 4

The White Mage Doesn't Want to Raise the Hero's Level (Japanese: 白魔術師は勇者のレベルを上げたくない, Hepburn: Shiro Majutsu-shi wa Yuusha no Reberu o Agetakunai) is a Japanese manga series by Kirie. It was serialized online via Flex Comix's Comic Meteor website from December 2020 to January 2023 and was collected in four tankōbon volumes from August 2021 to March 2023.

== Plot ==
Izumi Irie is summoned to another world as a hero, where he joins forces with Sheena, a high-level mage. Sheena develops romantic feelings for Irie, and, not wanting Irie to be returned to his original world once they defeat the Demon King, wears revealing outfits to distract him during battles.

== Publication ==
Written and illustrated by Kirie, The White Mage Doesn't Want to Raise the Hero's Level began as a one-shot published in Flex Comix's Comic Meteor website on 11 March 2020. It later became a full series from 16 December 2020 to 25 January 2023. The first volume was released on 6 August 2021. The series was collected in four volumes up to 10 March 2023. The series has been licensed by Seven Seas Entertainment for English publication.

=== Volumes ===
No.	Original release date	Original ISBN	English release date	English ISBN
1	6 August 2021	978-4-86-675160-3	16 January 2024	979-8-88843-194-8
2	10 December 2021	978-4-86-675179-5	7 May 2024	979-8-88843-398-0
3	12 July 2022	978-4-86-675229-7	10 September 2024	979-8-89160-202-1
4	10 March 2023	978-4-86-675274-7	14 January 2025	979-8-89160-301-1
