= Limited Lovers =

Japanese manga series

- Cover of volume 1 of the manga Limited lovers by Keiko Yamada

リミテッド・ラヴァーズ (Rimiteddo Ravazu)
- Manga
- Written by: Keiko Yamada
- Original run: November 18, 2004 – September 16, 2005
- Volumes: 3

Limited Lovers (リミテッド・ラヴァーズ, Rimiteddo Ravazu; lit. Limited Lovers) is a Japanese manga authored by Keiko Yamada, first published in 2004. The manga follows the life of a schoolgirl called Kakinomoto Karin, who loses the use of her legs following an accident, and subsequently falls in love with her attendant doctor, Okita Teppei.

Each chapter is called a 'Step'. As of chapter 13, Karin and Okita have been forced to give up on their hospital due to personal attacks by the board of a competing hospital.

The manga addresses the discrimination, low quality of life and lack of independence that people with disabilities experience.

Limited Lovers was originally picked up to be licensed for release in English, along the lines of Yamada's first two series, but was subsequently dropped.

== See also ==
- Keiko Yamada
- Shōjo
