= The Young Magician =

Japanese manga series

- Cover of the first volume

少年魔法士 (Shōnen Mahōshi)
- Genre: Dark fantasy
- Manga
- Written by: Yuri Narushima
- Published by: Shinshokan
- English publisher: NA: CMX (former)
- Magazine: Wings
- Original run: November 1995 – October 28, 2016
- Volumes: 18

The Young Magician (Japanese: 少年魔法士, Hepburn: Shōnen Mahōshi) is a fantasy shōjo manga written and illustrated by Yuri Narushima.

== Plot ==
Incorporating multiple sub-plots, The Young Magician focuses on two young men—Carno Guino, a magician whose soul fuses with demons, and Ibuki Shikishima, who practices Shinto—who find themselves entangled in a complex war between various factions.

== Development ==
Yuri Narushima collected references books about magic for The Young Magician; in the afterword of the first volume, she comments that "[her] bookcase is totally over-flowing with reference material!" She also planned to take a research trip to Hong Kong in September. For the section of the first volume in which the characters discuss genetics, she consulted The Meaning of Immunity by Tomio Tada and Understanding Genetics by Hironori Kodama. Because of the content in the first volume, she often received letters asking if the manga was horror—which she does not consider it to be.

== Release ==
Written and illustrated by Yuri Narushima, the chapters of The Young Magician have appeared as a serial in the Japanese manga magazine Wings between its November 1995 issue and its December 2016 issue. Shinshokan collected the chapters into eighteen tankōbon between September 9, 1996, and July 25, 2015.

In 2005, the manga imprint of DC Comics, CMX, announced that it had licensed The Young Magician for an English-language release in North America. CMX put together an eighty-page sampler of manga for mature readers—The Young Magician, Sword of the Dark Ones, Monster Collection: The Girl Who Can Deal With Magic Monsters, Testarotho and Madara—and distributed it to retailers on June 8, 2005. CMX published thirteen volumes of The Young Magician, with translations by Hiroko Yoda of AltJapan Co., Ltd., from September 1, 2005, to April 21, 2009. Scheduled for publication on May 11, 2010, the fourteen volume remained unreleased as DC Comics announced on May 18 that the CMX imprint would end on July 1.

== Reception ==
The Young Magician has received generally positive reviews. Reviewers at Mania Entertainment ranked Young Magician sixth on their list of "20 Must Have CMX Manga", describing it as "[b]rutal and heavy" with "a rich world of characters and plots" and a challenging, nonlinear plot. Dan Polley of Manga Life considered the artwork "fairly innocuous" and occasionally helpful in accentuating the tone and plot, but sometimes detracted from the plot's appeal. Polley praised Narushima's skillful handling of the relationships between the characters and the growing suspense towards the ninth volume, but felt that the suspense in the eighth volume was uneven. Jason Thompson, in Manga: The Complete Guide, gave The Young Magician three and a half out of four stars, and praised it as "a powerful work of modern fantasy" with Narushima's writing and page layouts being an asset.
