= Orfina (manga) =

Manga series by Kitsune Tennouji

オルフィーナ (Orufīna)
- Genre: Adventure, Drama, Fantasy
- Manga
- Written by: Kitsune Tennouji
- Published by: Kadokawa Shoten
- English publisher: CMX
- Magazine: Monthly Comic Dragon; Monthly Dragon Age
- Original run: November 9, 1993 – May 8, 2004
- Volumes: 12
- Manga

Orfina Saga
- Written by: Kitsune Tennouji
- Published by: Kadokawa Shoten
- Magazine: Monthly Dragon Age
- Original run: August 9, 2004 – December 9, 2010
- Volumes: 8

Orfina (オルフィーナ) is a fantasy manga written and illustrated by Kitsune Tennouji. It was serialized in the Kadokawa Shoten publication Monthly Comic Dragon from its December 1993 to April 2003 issues before the magazine converted to Monthly Dragon Age, where the manga completed its run from the July 2003 to June 2004 issues. It was also published in North America as part of the CMX label of DC Comics. Orfina is based in the medieval times and rated mature due to nudity, language, violence and suggested situation.

A sequel series, Orfina Saga, also authored by Kitsune Tennouji, ran in Monthly Dragon Age from September 2004 to January 2011.

== Characters ==
- Princess Orfina: She is the princess of the Kingdom of Cordia.
- Faana Risoru: The only survivor of her hometown, which was destroyed by the Granza Military. Half-dead, she is discovered by Triffa and King Yoguf. She is taken to Cordia and nursed back to health. She looks just like Orfina, almost as though they are twin sisters. When the king introduces Faana Risoru to Orfina, the princess has a fit. She soon relaxes after the king explains. Soon the two became friends.
- Yoguf: Father of Orfina and King of Cordia.
- Yunemea: Mother of Orfina and Queen of Cordia.
- Sarueri: A retired knight of the kingdom who was known as a fierce fighter.
- Elnera: A maid of the king and queen.
- Triffa: A Kulfia one horn wolf. It is a pet of the kingdom. Strangely, it takes a liking to Faana and only allows Faana to ride it. The creature is also the symbol of Cordia.
- Mayfee: A baby Kulfia and pet of Cordia. It was captured after the kingdom fell. It is now a pet of Hyleka of Granze.
- Quaine: Captain of the princess's guard/a body guard for the princess.
- Ruskin: A traitor of the country who has been banished from Cordia. He soon returns to get revenge, fighting with Granza.
- Shettofgart: Orfina's fiancé.
  - Hyleka: A Granzian female military officer.
- Cisun Klade: He calls himself a Robin Hood, but really he is a thief.
- Merduz: Cisun's friend, who is the thieves' leader.
- General Xaviera: A knight for Granze who wears scary armor.
