= Palette of 12 Secret Colors =

Japanese manga series

十二秘色のパレット (Jūni Hisoku no Paretto)
- Genre: Fantasy, Romance
- Manga
- Written by: Nari Kusakawa
- Published by: Hakusensha
- English publisher: NA: CMX Manga
- Magazine: LaLa DX
- Original run: 2004 – 2008
- Volumes: 6

Palette of 12 Secret Colors (十二秘色のパレット, Jūni Hisoku no Paretto) is a Manga authored by Nari Kusakawa. It was published in English by CMX Manga.

== Plot summary ==
The story follows Cello, a wizard-in-training, who attends a school on the tropical island of Opal, where students study to become "Palettes", or color magicians. Each Palette learns how to borrow color from Opal's exotically colored birds and use the colors to "paint" objects. Cello is a poor student and often paints herself in the same bright pink color as her bird Yoyo by mistake, requiring her to visit the infirmary to restore her normal skin and hair color. Through these trips, she gradually befriends the school doctor Guell, a grumpy but kind palette who repeatedly gets involved in Cello's misadventures, such as interfering with a group of poachers or tutoring a group of unruly children.

== Characters ==
Cello
The main protagonist of Palette of 12 Secret Colors, a seemingly talentless Palette with a pet pink bird, Yoyo, whom Cello raised since he was a chick. She failed her freshman year in the Palette Training School. It is later discovered that she has some unique abilities.

Dr. Guell
Guell is the Palette Training School's doctor. He appears to be in an emotionless daze most of the time. He often tells Cello that she is the only Palette in the school that needs to come into the infirmary. He does, however, seem to genuinely care about Cello. His partner is a purple long-necked bird, Olga, who seems to act jealous every time Cello is around Dr. Guell. His full name is Lexell Guell since he is from "the North" and has a last name.

Mousseline
Mousseline is Cello's best friend. She is a sophomore Palette, as she passed in the year Cello failed. She is often seen with her partner, a yellow, round parrot-like bird named Kechonpa. (The English edition has a translation discrepancy with her name, as it has been seen as Mousseline, Mosseline, and Mosslyn).

Fenne
Fenne is Cello's newest friend and is one of the school's best students, according to Dr. Guell. He lost his partner when he first started school, but has since found a new partner, a migratory bird named Blackie. He often calls Cello names. He is also a Palette.
