= Variante =

Japanese manga series

- Variante - requiem for the world
- Cover of the first Variante manga volume

Variante -ヴァリアンテ- (Variante)
- Manga
- Written by: Iqura Sugimoto
- Published by: Kadokawa Shoten
- English publisher: US: CMX Manga
- Magazine: Monthly Dragon Age
- Original run: 2004 – 2006
- Volumes: 4

Variante - requiem for the world (Variante -ヴァリアンテ-) is a Japanese horror manga by Iqura Sugimoto. The manga focuses on Hosho Aiko, a girl who is brought back to life by the left arm of a "Chimera", a grotesque human-derived species that can drastically alter the shape of their own body parts.

== Story ==
When Hosho Aiko came home one day, she found her entire family slaughtered by a grotesque monster. The creature attacked and killed her as well, but she finds herself awakening in a mysterious room, taken care of by Dr. Kochigawa. She has amnesia, but when another monster appears before her in her room, she regains her memories and her left arm changes into a powerful weapon, very similar to that of the monster, which she destroys.

Sudo remains as the closest person to Aiko, actively taking part in her missions and supporting her. He is alerted by a mysterious person of the existence of a girl named "Nana", about whom Sudo reacts with shock. It is revealed that Nana was a girl Sudo had found sitting before his house and had taken her in, only to discover that she was a Chimera and had killed her. But because of his awareness, he is hired by Atheos at a young age and his sickly mother is kept in Atheos's hospital, serving also as a bargaining chip to keep him in Atheos. Sudo leaves to find the present Nana in an experimental facility in the mountains. On the other side, Aiko is sent there on orders to kill a Chimera, feeling uneasy without Sudo's presence. They find Sudo held by the Chimera, Nana, who attacks them. Sudo asks Aiko to destroy the two together, as to kill Nana would hurt him and to leave Nana would mean in his being devoured, but she pulls him out of Nana, telling him to live. Nana is killed in the process, and Sudo is fired from the case for his actions and is put on house arrest.

Okuda reveals his intentions to use Aiko to give birth to a "Goddess" who will renew the human race. His hate for the current human race was spurned by his father, who was a scientist of war; enemy soldiers had broken into Okuda's home and killed his mother before his eyes. His father gave up his part as a war scientist and began to research an antibody, which resulted in the creation of Chimeras. Sudo criticizes Okuda's scheme and Okuda shoots him, but Aiko's Chimera arm intercepts the bullet, before telling Okuda that she will kill him if he proceeds to steal anything precious from her (referring to Sudo). The executive board sends in an army at this moment to destroy Okuda's plans, giving Sudo and Aiko a chance to escape.

Sudo, Aiko, and the Chief escape to the surface, but encounter Chimera soldiers who shoot Aiko. However, Sudo takes the blows and dies in Aiko's arms, shortly before he tries to kiss her. After seeing his death, Aiko goes berserk, killing the soldiers as the Chief holds Sudo's body, watching. The building then self-destructs, and Aiko loses consciousness; the rest of the people, including the Chief, then disappear for reasons unknown after the building exploded. While unconscious, Aiko dreams of her parents, the people she has met and made friends of, and Sudo, most, if not all, of them she loved are dead. She then wakes up alone, having lost her left arm and both legs. A person who looks like Sudo then kneels in front of Aiko and pats her on the head, where he disappears moments later in the following panel after she smiles joyfully with some tears in her eyes (whether this person was an illusion that Aiko thought of in her near-death state is unknown, but it's likely that it is an illusion). The story ends with the public informed of Atheos and the Chimeras, and a somehow fully regenerated and healthy Aiko (how she is able to be here with all her limbs back when the last time she is seen was her lying on the ground with no left arm and legs while smiling is unexplained, much less how she escaped from the place where she woke up in a near-death state in the first place) walking in a heavily populated area. Someone (this person is unknown) calls her name, and she turns around towards this person with a smile.

== Characters ==
Hosho Aiko
The protagonist of the story, a 16-year-old girl who is murdered but revives to find herself with a strange left arm. She initially wants to die and join her foster parents, but is convinced by Sudo to live and find a new place where she can belong. She constantly depends on Sudo for support during her missions and feels unsafe without him, as is implied during the mission to destroy Nana. Although she hated her left arm for being a Chimaira, she finds out in a dream later that her left arm belonged to her father, who had been given Chimaira treatment. Feeling comforted, she emboldens her resolution to not become a monster and uses her arm only to protect what she feels is precious. Throughout the entire story, she maintains a close relationship with Sudo and it is heavily implied that they care for one another. She and Sudo betray the organization later and she lives through the self-destruction.
Sudo Hiromi
A member of Atheos initially with a band around his head. He is not very deeply informed about Atheos's goal but proceeds to work there, as his mother is being treated at Atheos's hospital in return for his job. He has had previous experience with Chimairas, the first one he meets being Nana. Unaware of what she really is, she tells him that she is being chased and he vows to protect her, though he goes back on that promise when she awakens as a Chimaira and he shoots her. Deeply passionate in what he does, he supports Aiko from the moment he meets her, seeing a bit of resemblance to Nana. However this passionate support changes into protectiveness and finally to love. Sudo is always wanting to see her smile, making a promise with her just before his death. He is always there for her during her missions and finally there to block her from a rain of bullets. He seemingly attempts to kiss her before falling limp in her arms once more but appears again when she wakes up near death and ruffles her hair.
Kochigawa
A member of Atheos and one of the masterminds behind the entire Atheos project. Aiko first encounters her in her Atheos room under her care. To Aiko, Kochigawa first appears as a cold hearted woman with only her goals in mind. Ruthlessly sending Aiko on life threatening missions, Kochigawa only analyzed Aiko based on convenience and usefulness. When Aiko became useless to the Atheos organization, Kochigawa turned her in to Director Okuda. It turns out much later that Kochigawa's mother was Director Okuda's wife and was administered Chimaira treatment. However when her mother evolved into one, she was killed by Okuda. Since then, Kochigawa has hated her father and desired to revive her mother, together with Okuda, thus using Aiko for that purpose. When her plan was realized by a close associate, Yuji Oumi, she ignored his pleas to flee with her, which resulted in Oumi's being killed, although this was later proved to be false. Having met Oumi again changed her perspective on things and she sided with the protagonists, killing her father and committing suicide, shutting herself in the self-destructing facility.
Director Okuda
One of the Executive Board members and a mastermind behind the entire revival project. Okuda is often described as a heartless man, which is proven with his aggression towards Aiko when she becomes reclusive. He hates humans, the first human he ever hated being his father, as he blames him for the reason that his mother was killed. Okuda claims to only care for two people in the world, his mother and Kochigawa's mother, which was the reason for his obsessive desire to revive her. For this reason, Okuda is willing to use Aiko in order to revive her, but his plan is foiled by his own daughter who shoots him before committing suicide.
Chimaira
Originally humans who were administered Chimaira treatment. Director Okuda's father was the reason behind their existence, as his wife was killed for his having developed nuclear weapons, he became determined to create a foil of such, which were omnipotent antibodies. However his own plan failed when the tested human bodies rejected the antibodies in such violent manners that they became monster-like. Aiko first encounters one in her foster family's house, though she discovers much later that it was actually her father, who had fled a long time ago along with several others from the Atheos facility in an unexplained explosion.

== Reception ==
In Jason Thompson's online appendix to Manga: The Complete Guide, he regards the protagonist's "emo and paralyzed by doubt" nature as being due to the influence of Neon Genesis Evangelion on manga and anime.
