= Megane na Kanojo =

Japanese manga series

- Front cover art for the manga.

眼鏡なカノジョ
- Genre: Comedy, romance
- Manga
- Written by: Tobi
- Published by: Flex Comix
- Magazine: Flex Comix Blood
- Original run: 2007 – 2008
- Volumes: 1
- Original video animation
- Directed by: Koji Ito
- Written by: Koji Ito
- Studio: AIC
- Released: November 25, 2010
- Episodes: 4

Megane na Kanojo (眼鏡なカノジョ; "Spectacled Girlfriends") is a Japanese manga series by Tobi. It was serialized in Flex Comix's Flex Comix Blood online shōnen manga magazine between 2007 and 2008, and was collected in a single tankōbon volume. It was adapted into a series of OVA in 2010.

== Characters ==
- Satomi Moriya as Kana Asō (ep 1)
- Nobuhiko Okamoto as Jun'ichi Kamiya (ep 1)
- Asami Imai as Aya Ichinohe (eps 1–2)
- Daisuke Hirakawa as Takashi Miyaguchi (ep 2)
- Saori Hayami as Mitsuki Kimura (ep 3)
- Atsushi Abe as Tōru Tanaka (ep 3)
- Kana Hanazawa as Chiaki Kuramoto (ep 4)
- Hiro Shimono as Tatsuya Takatsuka (ep 4)
