= Venus in Love =

Japanese manga series

ビーナスは片想い (Bīnasu wa Kataomoi)
- Genre: Romance, Comedy, Drama
- Manga
- Written by: Yuki Nakaji
- Published by: Hakusensha
- English publisher: AUS: Madman Entertainment; NA: CMX Manga; SG: Chuang Yi
- Magazine: LaLa
- Original run: 5 November 1999 – 5 July 2004
- Volumes: 12

Venus in Love (ビーナスは片想い, Bīnasu wa Kataomoi; lit. "Unrequited Venus"), also known as Love for Venus, is a shōjo manga by Yuki Nakaji (なかじ 有紀, Nakaji Yūki). The series revolves around the lives of a group of students at Koutou University in Hyōgo Prefecture and primarily around the relationships of the main characters, Suzuna Ashihara and Eichi Uozumi. The manga is published in English in Singapore by Chuang Yi as Love For Venus and in North America by CMX Manga as Venus in Love.

== Characters ==
Names are in Western order, with the surname after the given name.

=== Major characters ===
Suzuna Ashihara
Suzuna is an 18-year-old freshman at Koutou University. She lives in apartment 206 of Apartment Shugesou, next door to Eichi Uozumi. She quickly becomes friends with Eichi and they become very close. Suzuna immediately develops a huge crush on Fukami after meeting him but this soon fades as her feelings for Eichi grow. Her birthday is September 10th.
Eichi Uozumi
Eichi lives next door to Suzuna, in apartment 207. He is the best friend of Fukami and has been since they met in high school. It is revealed late in the first volume that he has a crush on Fukami and thus becomes Suzuna's love rival. This doesn't seem to dampen their friendship in the least and his feelings for her gradually change into something more romantic. He plans to become an Archaeologist. His birthday is March 31st.
Yuki Ikeuchi
Yuki lives next door to both Suzuna and Eichi in apartment 205. He makes his first appearance towards the end of Vol. 3. His Green eyes give away his half Greek descent, which he uses when he models part-time. He quickly falls for Eichi which creates a bit of a competition between Suzuna and himself, until he realises that it is no longer Eichi he likes but Suzuna. His birthday is April 3rd.

Shinya Fukami
Fukami is the initial love interest for Suzuna and Eichi, as well as most of the female population, although he seems to be oblivious to this. He also attends Koutou University and is a first year majoring in English Literature. His birthday is June 19th.
Hinako Kaji
Hinako is the friend of Suzuna as well as Fukami and Eichi, whom she has known since high school when she had a crush on him, although her advance was flatly rejected. She is in love with Mr. Hokari, her Greek professor. Her birthday is August 5th.
Honoka Kashiwagi
Honoka is a second year student majoring in fashion design. She and Fukami meet on the train and run into each other several times after that, always in situations which are embarrassing for Fukami (usually involving him being drunk). After a few of these run ins they agree to go out and start a relationship. Her birthday is June 15th.

=== Minor characters ===
Satoru Ashihara
Satoru is the younger brother of Suzuna. He is 16.
Tomoki Uozumi
Tomoki is the younger brother of Eichi, who he resembles a great deal - even to the extent that upon first meeting with Suzuna she mistook him for Eichi and thought he dyed his hair black. Tomoki attends Koto Junior High and later gets accepted into a Beauty School. His birthday is May 5th.
Shizuka Uozumi
Shizuka is the older sister of Eichi and Tomoki. She was killed in an accident whilst on holiday in Hawaii. The nature of the accident is not explained in the manga. Her birthday is October 4th.
Kohei Kawauchi
Kohei is Suzuna's first neighbor on the right, in apartment 205. He is a huge fan of Miracle Mako, an anime character, whom he believes Suzuna resembles.

== Manga ==
Published by Hakusensha in 1999, the series was translated into English by Chuang Yi as Love for Venus for Madman Entertainment and later by DC Comics under its CMX imprint.
