= Swan (manga) =

Japanese manga series

- Cover of the first tankōbon volume, featuring Masumi Hijiri
- Manga
- Written by: Kyoko Ariyoshi
- Published by: Shueisha
- English publisher: NA: CMX Manga
- Magazine: Margaret
- Original run: 1976 – 1981
- Volumes: 21

Swan (stylized as SWAN) is a shōjo manga by Kyoko Ariyoshi. This manga series is the representative work of Kyoko Ariyoshi, which is the most famous ballet manga and has been highly evaluated.

The shōjo magazine Margaret serialized the story in Japan from 1976 to 1981. 21 volumes were released as Margaret comics series by Akita Shoten in Japan.

In North America the story was published by CMX, but the series was abandoned after 15 volumes due to the closure of the imprint. The plot mostly follows a young girl, Masumi, as she struggles to become a ballerina. By 2011, the manga had over 20 million copies in circulation.

== Plot ==
The first volume begins with Masumi sneaking backstage after a Tokyo ballet performance in order to express her admiration for the lead dancers, Alexei Sergeiev and Maya Plisetskaya. However, when she meets the stars, Masumi becomes tongue-tied and clumsily begins to dance the Odile Variation from Swan Lake. Sergeiev and Prisetskaya graciously excuse her, saying that nothing could give them more happiness than her physical expression of appreciation, and Masumi returns home slightly embarrassed. Later, Masumi receives an invitation to enter a nationwide ballet competition. The competition is being held to discover the best ballet students in Japan, in order to invite them to an exclusive ballet school designed to improve the quality of Japanese ballet. Her impromptu dance for Sergeiev and Prisetskaya captured the attention of Sergeiev, and so Masumi goes to Tokyo in order to compete.

Once there, Masumi meets Sayoko Kyogoku and Hisho Kusakabe, who both witnessed her clumsy Black Swan at the theater. They are now competing against each other. However, the three become friends, along with Aoi Yanagisawa, Kusakabe's friendly rival. Out of the eight finalists, Masumi, Sayako, Kusakabe, and Aoi are all accepted. However, Masumi is obviously the weakest of the eight. She must un-learn the bad habits she picked up at her former ballet school.

Future volumes continue Masumi's entrance into the competitive world of ballet.

== Characters ==
Masumi Hijiri (聖 真澄, Hijiri Masumi)
The heroine of the manga, Masumi is a 16-year-old Japanese girl whose life changes after entering a ballet competition and winning a place at an exclusive national ballet school. She grew up in rural Japan (Hokkaido) with her widowed father. She is filled with self-doubt, but passionately loves ballet. She has a weakness that is a self-defense mechanism which kicks in when she feels threatened or less than up to par. She will suddenly become deaf and is unable to hear anything. This is something that she seems to start to overcome as the series moves forward.
Sayoko Kyougoku (京極 小夜子, Kyōgoku Sayoko)
An accomplished young ballerina, who fears her chance at stardom will be lost to the younger Masumi. Sayoko has been interested in ballet since she was a very small girl. Although she resents Masumi for being younger and having more opportunity to grow as a dancer, Sayoko still feels sympathy for the naive Masumi. Sayako was a Prima Ballerina for one night during the production of Sleeping Beauty in which she played Aurora. But the second night of the production ended in disaster when she completely severed her Achilles tendon during a grand jete. This tests her strength and determination and makes her grow as a person. She must learn to dance again. Where once it was easy, it's now difficult. But she loves ballet and is determined to regain what she lost.
Hishou Kusakabe (草壁 飛翔, Kusakabe Hishō)
A talented young male dancer who has known Sayoko for a long time. They are normally partnered together. His rival and friend is Aoi, who jokes about wanting a chance to dance with Sayoko. He is in love with Sayoko, but also finds himself attracted to Masumi and the passion she has for ballet. He finally has to make a decision and tells Masumi that the only one for him his Sayako. He even asks Sayoko to be his partner in ballet for as long as they both dance.
Aoi Yanagisawa (柳沢 葵, Yanagisawa Aoi)
The best friend and rival of Hisho. Aoi is a genius of ballet. He acts wildly, creatively, lively. He secretly loves Masumi but she sees no interest because she loves Hisho. He is bold and dynamic. He receives the role of Perelsnik in "Song of the Forest" and uses his love and passion for Masumi to interpret the role. He eventually leaves for Monaco. No one can tell what this aspiring danseur noble will do in the future.
Kaoru Aoishi (青石 薫, Aoishi Kaoru)
A junior of Masumi in the ballet school and her rival. Her mother long ago was Masumi's mother's rival, but she couldn ever never win against Masumi's mother, so she is strict to her daughters.
Alexei Sergeiev (アレクセイ・セルゲイエフ, Arekusei Serugeiefu)
Masumi's teacher. He's a very accomplished danseur noble and feels that Masumi holds great promise. He encourages her to work hard and to remember the basics. It's hard to say what goes on in his mind, but he cares for Masumi deeply.
Leonhardt von Christ (レオンハルト・フォン・クライスト, Reonharuto fon Kuraisuto)
An aspiring danseur noble from West Germany. He's very charismatic, but confuses Masumi to no end. He has a tendency to irritate her, but then can be very caring and kind. When he first meets Masumi, he says he didn't realize she was dancing ballet and thought it was Japanese folk dancing. As the series progresses, he tells Masumi that they will be partners. He says they are very much alike and he knows they will be partners in their careers.
Larissa Maximova (ラリサ・マクシモーヴァ, Rarisa Makushimōva)
Self-proclaimed lifetime rival of Masumi. Lost to Masumi during a contest with the Odile variation because of reckless mistakes. She hasn't forgotten and has told Masumi that they will be rivals for life. Can be very irritating, but is a kind person at heart.
Lilliana Maximova (リリアナ・マクシモーヴァ, Ririana Makushimōva)
Larissa's cousin. She is beautiful, sylph-like, and the prodigy of Russia. Her innate ability to emulate fairy creatures is uncanny. The first time Masumi's weakness comes out is after she watched Lilliana perform The White Swan from Swan Lake. She was supposed to perform after Lilliana and it terrified her. She felt inadequate and became deaf to the music. Masumi finds her wonderful and adorable outside competition, but has a tendency to lose herself when competing against Lilliana.
Serge Lavrovsky (セルジュ・ラブロフスキー, Seruju Raburofusukī)
A mysterious ex-dancer who comes into Masumi's life out of the blue. In time, she comes to realize that this man and her now-deceased mother had been in love and had danced together. Serge helps Masumi when she has problems trying to find her Shirin for a competition. He shows her how to express herself through the movement and to become the character. He tells her that only through great suffering can true dancing be achieved. Much is hinted about this man, but no questions have been answered.
Sydney Ekland (シドニー・エクランド, Shidonī Ekurando)
A British ballerina who is Masumi's roommate when she is studying at Royal Academy of United Kingdom.
Fernando Cardenas (フェルナンド・カルデナス, Ferunando Karudenasu)
A Cuban ballet dancer who is Sayoko's fan. He is Masumi's senior when she is studying at Royal Academy.
Balanchine (バランシン, Baranchin)
An American master of modern ballet. Masumi comes with Leonhardt to United States to learn from him.
Margaret Brown (マーガレット・ブラウン, Māgaretto Buraun)
One of Balanchine's students. A member of the solo dancers performing at New York. Being watched by Suzanne Farell (スザンヌ・ファレル, Suzannu Fareru).
Lucian Stanley (ルシアン・スタンレー, Rushian Sutanrī)
An American ballet student, one of Leon's friends. Later Masumi and he have a romantic relationship, but their end is a tragedy.
Edward Lucas (エドワード・ルーカス, Edowādo Rūkasu)
Another friend of Leon and American ballet student.
Stephanie Austin (ステファニー・オースティン, Sutefanī Ōsutin)
A friend of Leon's and an American ballerina. She has advice for Masumi when she is in New York.

== Publication ==
The series was published as full volumes by Shueisha throughout the late 1970s and early 80s under their Margaret Comics imprint. It was published up to volume 15 in English by CMX Comics before the imprint closed its doors.

=== Volume list ===
No.	Original release date	Original ISBN	English release date	English ISBN
1	1977	4-08-850296-5	2005	1-4012-0535-6
2	1977	4-08-850300-7	2005	978-1-4012-0536-2
3	1978	4-08-850330-9	—	1-4012-0537-2
4	1978	4-08-850334-1	—	978-1-4012-0538-6
5	1978	4-08-850339-2	2006	978-1-4012-0539-3
6	1978	4-08-850375-9	2006	978-1-4012-0866-0
7	1979	4-08-850381-3	—	978-1-4012-0867-7
8	1979	4-08-850385-6	—	978-1-4012-0868-4
9	1979	4-08-850423-2	2007	978-1-4012-0869-1
10	1979	4-08-850428-3	2007	978-1-4012-0870-7
11	1979	4-08-850434-8	2007	978-1-4012-0871-4
12	1980	4-08-850479-8	February 2008	978-1-4012-0872-1
13	1980	4-08-850486-0	2008	978-1-4012-0873-8
14	1980	4-08-850492-5	August 2008	978-1-4012-0874-5
15	1980	4-08-850500-X	2010	978-1-4012-2230-7
16	1980	4-08-850533-6		
17	1981	4-08-850541-7		
18	1981	4-08-850548-4		
19	1981	4-08-850589-1		
20	1981	4-08-850596-4		
21	1981	4-08-850604-9		

== Reception ==
Julie Rosato described Swan as "a rich narrative which describes classic shoujo". Erin Finnegan regards it as "a classic title that belongs on everyone's 'Must Read' list", feeling that it will certainly appeal to young girls, but also to male readers due to Swan being "so girly it goes all the way around the circle from feminine to masculine again". The Swan has getting high reputation and evaluation. The total sales of this manga series is over 20 million copies.
