= Yukarism =

Japanese manga series

- Cover of the first manga volume

ゆかりズム
- Genre: Historical, Romance
- Manga
- Written by: Shiomi Chika
- Published by: Hakusensha
- English publisher: Viz Media
- Magazine: Bessatsu Hana to Yume
- Original run: June 20, 2011 – June 20, 2015
- Volumes: 4

Yukarism (ゆかりズム) is a Japanese shōjo manga written and illustrated by Shiomi Chika (the manga artist of Night of the Beasts, Yurara, and Canon). The manga was first serialized in Bessatsu Hana to Yume magazine in 2010 and published in tankōbon form by Hakusensha in June 2011. The series was licensed in North America by Viz Media in 2014.

== Plot ==
Seventeen-year-old Yukari Kobayakawa writes historical fiction novels about Japan's Edo period. He writes as if he were living in the Edo period. Coincidentally, he never needs to do any research to write about the past because he already knows it, because he was born with his memories from his past life still intact. He remembers his life as a female courtesan from the Yoshiwara district. Yukari's memories come to life in his dreams when he first meets his classmate Mahoro. Mahoro is somehow linked to Yukari's past. Along the way, Yukari meets other reincarnated souls from his previous life, hoping to uncover who killed him in his past life.

== Setting ==
Yoshiwara, also known as the red-light district, was located in the city of Edo (now known as Tokyo). For hundreds of years, many men visited Yoshiwara to be entertained by beautiful geishas, courtesans, and dancers. The women of Yoshiwara consider their work as a form of art, much like geishas do. They require years of training to become proficient in their trade. Only the best woman in Yoshiwara can have the title of Oiran. Where they are treated like celebrity entertainers.

Samurai, ninja and high-ranking officials often visited Yoshiwara during the Edo period after Tokugawa shogunate established it in 1604. The lifestyle of the people in Yoshiwara, their clothes, dancing, and mannerism influenced the world outside Yoshiwara. Tales about Yoshiwara often depict the women as highly sought-after flowers that capture the attention of political figures from all across Edo. They are not permitted to leave the brothels of Yoshiwara unless they elope with customers, hence why some people consider their profession a form of imprisonment. Historical documents also show that some of the women that worked at Yoshiwara were the wives or daughters of fallen samurai or feudal lords. Some poor families sell their daughters to Yoshiwara in order to provide food for themselves.

== Characters ==
Yukari Kobayakawa (小早川 紫)
Yukari is an established seventeen year old author who writes fiction novels set in the Edo period of Japan. He can write such novels with great amount of detail thanks to his knowledge from his previous life as a female courtesan named Yuumurasaki. When Yukari sleeps, he lives the life of the oiran Yuumurasaki. As the story progresses, Yukari learns about his previous life as Yuumurasaki and uncovers the secrets behind is sudden death in his previous life. Yukari’s personality is rather laid-back. He rarely pays attention to his surroundings and completely immerses himself in his writing. Without the aid of his housekeeper, he wouldn't be able to take care of himself. Although he is a well-known author, he doesn’t particularly enjoy writing. He just writes because he can and he has the knowledge that enables him to write such stories with detailed settings.
Mahoro Tachibana (真秀)
Mahoro is a fellow classmate of Yukari. She is extremely interested in his work and considers herself one of his biggest fans. She also appears to be infatuated with him; although Yukari rarely acknowledges her presence or pays attention to her. When Yukari first met Mahoro, he felt weird and dizzy. Then, he noticed a burn mark on her wrist. The injury seemed familiar to Yukari, yet he couldn’t figure out why, until he blacked out and relived his past life memories in his dreams. There, he met a person named Kazuma and a vivid vision of a burn mark like the one on Mahoro’s wrist. Yukari is convinced that Mahoro is a reincarnated soul from his past life. Mahoro starts following Yukari everywhere in the hopes of getting his attention and helping him with his novel. Yukari keeps a close eye on Mahoro, as she might help him discover the reason behind his death in his previous life.
Hitoha (ヒトハ)
Hitoha is a young girl that works as an apprentice in the brothel that Yuumurasaki works in. She is a shy young girl with a very sad past. Her parents tried to kill her numerous times before selling her to the brothel. The girl was so traumatized to the point of hiding her face from everyone to avoid being scolded. The only person that Hitoha trusts is Yuumurasaki; because other courtesans yell at her all the time and scare her. Yukari met Hitoha for the first time when he blacked out and entered Yuumurasaki’s body. He felt bad for the girl and helped cheer her up when se was scolded by the other ladies in Yoshiwara. Then, Yukari met a fellow fan that he believes is the reincarnated soul of Hitoha. His fan is extremely shy just like Hitoha and she told him that she feels safe with him. Apparently his fan also has some vivid memories from her past life as Hitoha. She also confined in Yukari and told him that she felt that her parents were trying to kill her. Hitoha’s past mingled with her reincarnated soul and his poor fan feels the same misery that Hitoha went through.
Masa (マサ)
A sweet old woman that works for Yukari as a house maid. She takes care of Yukari’s house and ensures that he eats his meals regularly and gets enough sleep. Due to his laid-back personality, Masa often needs to break his train of thought to remind him to eat or sleep. She also ensures that Yukari goes to school regularly; although he skips a lot due to his work. She also takes care of cleaning Yukari’s messy workspace; collecting his manuscripts and organizing them on his disk. Unfortunately, Masa hurt her back when she slipped on one of Yukari’s manuscript pages while cleaning his disk. She is recovering from her injury while her nephew replaces her as Yukari’s housekeeper.
Katsuhiko Satomi (里見)
Satomi is a young man from current-day Japan. He is the nephew of Masa, Yukari’s maid. When Masa slipped on Yukari’s manuscript and hurt her back, she asked Satomi to take care of Yukari while she recovers. Satomi had a well-paying job and good accommodation until he lost his job and his housing privileges. When his aunt asked him if he was interested in becoming a housekeeper, he immediately accepted the job; seeing as he desperately needs the money. There seems to be a connection between Yukari and Satomi, as he has an eerie feeling about him. Mahoro shares the same feeling as Yukari; they both don’t trust Satomi and feel awkward around him. Yukari is somewhat convinced that Satomi might have something to do with his death back in Edo.
Yuumurasaki (湯村崎)
The top courtesan (oiran) in Yoshiwara. She is very kind to her assistants like Hitoha and is considered a beauty in Edo. When Yukari realizes that in his previous life he was Yuumurasaki, he surprisingly doesn’t freak out. He just lives the role of a female courtesan and tries to act normal around her assistants. Yuumurasaki’s soul enters Yukari’s body when he sleeps and he lives as her in his dreams. During this time, he acts strangely and forgets his manners, which causes Yuumurasaki’s assistants to freak out due to her odd behavior. Yukari takes it upon himself to interact with as many people as possible to discover who killed Yuumurasaki (him) in his previous life.
Kazuma (和真)
Kazuma is a bodyguard in Tatsutaya, the establishment in which Yuumurasaki works as an oiran. Kazuma has a burn-like mark similar to the one that Mahoro has on her wrist. However, it is unclear if he really is related to Mahoro or not. Although Yukari seems convinced that Mahoro is the reincarnated soul of Kazuma due to the burn mark on them both. Kazuma is extremely loyal to Yuumurasaki and he takes care of her when Yukari enters her body. He feels that there is something wrong with Yuumurasaki because she keeps acting weird, so he was assigned to take care of her when she gets ill (i.e. when Yukari enters her body).
Takamura Shizuka (高村静香)
He is a frequent customer in Tatsutaya and he usually requests the services of Yuumurasaki. In Edo, Shizuka is known as strong witch-doctor. All the establishments in Edo fear his curse and try to please him or offer him free services. Rumors about Shizuka say that he will curse people to kill them if he was paid to do so, that’s why he is feared by many people. Strangely, Yuumurasaki is one of the few people that are not afraid of Shizuka, and he seems to enjoy her company a lot. However, Yukari thinks that Shizuka might be Yuumurasaki’s killer. He did not feel at ease when he first met him in Yuumurasaki’s body. Yet, it appears that Shizuka is hiding something from everyone…

== Manga ==
No.	Original release date	Original ISBN	North America release date	North America ISBN
01	June 20, 2011	9784592192619	December 2, 2014	978-1421575902
02	December 20, 2011	9784592192633	April 7, 2015	978-1421576008
03	August 20, 2013	9784592192640	July 7, 2015	978-1421575995
04	June 20, 2015	9784592194705	November 3, 2015	978-1421579719

== Reception ==
Yukarism was listed as one of the 15 top graphic novels for teens by YALSA in North America. Rebecca Silverman from Anime News Network praised its interesting concept and historical setting.
