= Apothecarius Argentum =

Japanese manga series

- Cover of the first Japanese volume of Apothecarius Argentum.

薬師アルジャン (Yakushi Argent)
- Manga
- Written by: Tomomi Yamashita
- Published by: Akita Shoten
- English publisher: NA: CMX Manga
- Magazine: Princess Gold
- Original run: 2004 – 2009
- Volumes: 11

Apothecarius Argentum (Japanese: 薬師アルジャン, Hepburn: Yakushi Arujan) is a Japanese shōjo manga series by Tomomi Yamashita, published in Akita Shoten's Princess Gold magazine and collected into eleven volumes. It was licensed in English by CMX Manga, who released the first eight volumes. It is about a princess, Primula, and her bodyguard Argent.

== Characters ==
- Argent: Born and raised as a basilisk, a human being who is fed poison since childhood, later becomes resistant to poison and becomes poisonous as well. Basilisk's touch is enough to kill a normal human. His silver hair is the definite proof of how poisonous he is. He was bought by the King as a slave to become Primula's poison tester. Primula aided his escape and he became an apothecary, a person who is well known to create and prescribe medicine. His talent led him back to the castle as a royal apothecary. He falls in love with Primula and protects her secretly. He is very devoted to Primula and always ready to sacrifice himself for her. Since his touch is poisonous he is not able to pursue Primula despite the fact that their feeling is mutual. His feelings for Primula later also become his motivation to find a cure for his condition.
- Primula: The only heir and princess of the Beazol kingdom. She is called the "iron princess" due to her tomboyish nature. When she was young, she became the target of assassinations with poison. She did not know at first, why Argent was brought to the castle. She was the one who gave Argent his name and tried to befriend him. After she knew Argent's role as her poison tester, she aided his escape. Primula also vowed to become stronger so that no one would be sacrificed for her anymore. She loves Argent but her position and her responsibilities as the princess as well as Argent's nature as basilisk held her back.

== Reception ==
Katherine Dacey of Pop Culture Shock describes Primula as being a modern, faux-independent Disney princess, but feels that the manga is overly flawed to be a guilty pleasure. Connie C. for the same outlet regarded the manga as being one of her favourites, but felt that the seventh volume was not the best as it separated Primula and Argent. Brigid Alverson from Graphic Novel Reporter described the manga as being an enjoyable light read.
