= Tono to Inu =

Japanese manga series

- First tankōbon volume cover

殿と犬
- Genre: Comedy
- Manga
- Written by: Rie Nishida
- Published by: Flex Comix
- Imprint: Polaris Comics
- Magazine: Comic Polaris
- Original run: March 18, 2021 – present
- Volumes: 6
- Anime television series
- Directed by: Haruka Kasugamori
- Music by: Shun Miyazaki
- Studio: OLM; Live2D Creative Studio
- Original network: Tokyo MX, MBS
- Original run: October 10, 2024 – March 28, 2025
- Episodes: 24

Tono to Inu (殿と犬; "The Lord and the Dog") is a Japanese manga series by Rie Nishida. It originally began as a short-term serialization via Flex Comix's Comic Polaris website in March 2021. It later continued to be serialized since October 2021 and has been collected in six tankōbon volumes. An anime television series adaptation produced by OLM and Live2D Creative Studio aired from October 2024 to March 2025.

== Characters ==
Tono (殿)
Voiced by: Akio Otsuka ("Wan Wan" version), Tomokazu Sugita ("Pote Pote" version), Shunsuke Takeuchi ("Kun Kun" version), Masaki Aiba ("Mofu Mofu" version)

== Media ==
=== Manga ===
Written by Rie Nishida, Tono to Inu initially began serialization as a short-term series on Flex Comix's Comic Polaris manga website on March 18, 2021. It later began regular serialization on October 14 of that same year. Its chapters have been collected into six tankōbon volumes as of March 2026.

No.	Release date	ISBN
1	September 15, 2022	978-4-86-675240-2
2	May 15, 2023	978-4-86-675288-4
3	February 15, 2024	978-4-86-675341-6
4	October 15, 2024	978-4-86-675384-3
5	July 15, 2025	978-4-86-675446-8
6	March 13, 2026	978-4-86-675496-3

=== Anime ===
An anime adaptation was announced on January 25, 2024. It was later revealed to be a television series. The series is produced by OLM and Live2D Creative Studio and directed by Haruki Kasugamori, with Shun Miyazaki composing the music. It premiered with the "Wan Wan" version on Tokyo MX on October 10, 2024.
