= Steel Fist Riku =

Japanese martial arts manga

- Steel Fist Riku volume 1 as released by CMX

拳鋼少女リク (Kenkō Shōjo Riku)
- Genre: Action, Adventure, Comedy, Martial arts
- Manga
- Written by: Jyutaroh Nishino
- Published by: Flex Comix
- English publisher: NA / UK: CMX
- Magazine: Flex Comix Blood
- Original run: December 12, 2006 – June 12, 2008
- Volumes: 3

Steel Fist Riku (拳鋼少女リク, Kenkō Shōjo Riku) is a martial arts manga written and illustrated by Jyutaroh Nishino. CMX has released an English version of the manga in the United States, Canada and the United Kingdom.

== Plot ==
Steel Fist Riku is set in an otherwise similar world where humans co-exist with half-human animals. A small village where Iwao Rokuhara, once a promising fighter, works in a movie photo store with an orphan girl which he took in and gave the name Riku, making her his pupil and (more or less) adopted daughter. Riku was born with the ability to make her left fist become steel.

== Reception ==
Carlo Santos, a columnist for the Anime News Network, gava a positive review to Steel Fist Riku. He found the manga surprisingly fun to read with "snappy action scenes, sprightly humor, and amusing characters".
