= Flex Comix =

Japanese publisher

Flex Comix Inc.
- Native name: フレックスコミックス株式会社
- Type: Joint stock company
- Industry: Manga
- Founded: November 1, 2006
- Headquarters: Chiyoda, Tokyo, Japan
- Owner: BookLive
- Website: https://flex-comix.jp/

Flex Comix Inc. (フレックスコミックス株式会社, Furekkusu Komikkusu Kabushiki gaisha) is a Japanese company specializing in the sale of manga magazines and goods related to the anime and manga industry in Japan. Flex Comix is affiliated with Asian Groove and Soft Bank BB, forming the Movida Holdings joint-investment company. The company publishes two magazines: Comi Digi +, and Monthly Shōnen Blood, which has been suspended. Flex Comix also has four web manga magazine websites called: FlexComix Blood, FlexComix Flare, Comic Meteor and Comic Polaris.

== History ==
The original Flex Comix was established on October 2, 2006, as part of the SoftBank Group's manga publishing business. It took over the print magazine Comi Digi + from Movida Entertainment and published it until 2008.

On January 16, 2007, Yahoo! Japan began offering manga from FlexComix Blood for free through its Yahoo! Comics service. The web magazine grew out of the website that accompanied the print magazine Monthly Shōnen Blood. Later in 2007, DC Comics invested in Flex Comix, and its manga imprint, CMX, licensed titles from the publisher for print release in the United States.

In 2012, Gaia Holdings acquired Flex Comix. That September, Gaia subsidiary G-Mode began moving series from FlexComix Blood and FlexComix Next to its online magazine Comic Meteor. Beginning in October, new chapters of the transferred series appeared exclusively in Comic Meteor. G-Mode also launched Comic Polaris in October 2012 as a free online manga magazine for girls.

BookLive acquired Flex Comix and Aplix IP Publishing on March 31, 2017. On July 1, Aplix IP Publishing absorbed the original Flex Comix and adopted its name.

== Publications ==
- Angel's Drop (天使のどろっぷ, Tenshi no Drop) was later adapted into an anime short by AIC Frontier.
- Broken Blade (ブレイク ブレイド, Bureiku Bureido)
- The Family Circumstances of the Irregular Witch (でこぼこ魔女の親子事情, Dekoboko Majo no Oyako Jijō)
- Dropkick on My Devil! (邪神ちゃんドロップキック, Jashin-chan Doroppukikku) was later adapted into an anime by Nomad.
- God's Puzzle (神様のパズル, Kamisama no pazuru)
- Hyakko (ヒャッコ)
- Kaijin Kaihatsubu no Kuroitsu-san (怪人開発部の黒井津さん, Kuroitsu-san in the Superhuman Research & Development Department)
- Love Tyrant (恋愛暴君, Ren'ai Bōkun)
- Maid Deka (メイド刑事)
- Megane na Kanojo (眼鏡なカノジョ, Glasses Girlfriends)
- Musashino-sen no Shimai (武蔵野線の姉妹, Sisters of Musashino Line)
- My Roommate Is a Cat
- Nyan Koi! (にゃんこい！, Meow Love!)
- Onsen Yōsei Hakone-chan (温泉幼精ハコネちゃん, Young Hot Spring Fairy Hakone-chan)
- Pupipō! (プピポー!)
- Rikei ga Koi ni Ochita no de Shōmei Shite Mita (理系が恋に落ちたので証明してみた, Science Fell in Love, So I Tried to Prove It)
- Steel Fist Riku (拳鋼少女リク, Kenkō Shōjo Riku)
- Those Who Hunt Elves 2 (エルフを狩るモノたち, Erufu wo Karu Mono-tachi)
- Tono to Inu
- True Tears (トゥルーティアーズ, Turū Tiāzu)
- The White Mage Doesn't Want to Raise the Hero's Level (白魔術師は勇者のレベルを上げたくない, Shiro Majutsu-shi wa Yuusha no Reberu o Agetakunai)
- Young Gun Carnaval (ヤングガン・カルナバル, Yanggugan Karunabaru)
