= Keiko Yamada (artist) =

Japanese manga artist

- Born: Kitakyushu, Japan
- Notable works: Limited Lovers

Keiko Yamada (山田 圭子, Yamada Keiko) is a Japanese manga artist, who has had all three of her serial manga picked up for English translation (although Limited Lovers remains untranslated).

Her first piece, a one-shot, was about old-style talking demons. She is most known for her manga VS (also known as 'Versus'), which has been noted for its unusual premise, in that it centres on violinists.

Yamada is also known for her distinctive drawing style which exaggerates elements of classic manga style. The watercolour-like quality of her coloured work has also been praised.

== Works ==
- VS (バーサス, Bāsasu; "Versus") (published in Princess Comics, licensed by DC Comics/CMX, 7 volumes)
- Go Go Heaven!! (ゴーゴーヘブン!!, Gō Gō Hebun!!) (DC Comics/CMX)(1994–2010, 13 volumes)
- Limited Lovers (リミテッド・ラヴァーズ, Rimiteddo Ravazu) (2004-ongoing, 3 volumes)
