= I've Got the Key to the Kingdom =

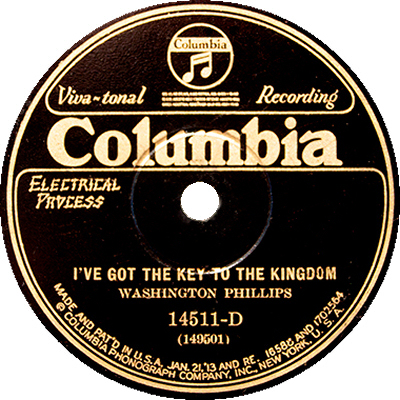

Single by Washington Phillips
- Recorded: Dallas, Texas, December 2, 1929
- Genre: Gospel blues
- Length: 3:05
- Label: Columbia
- Songwriter: See text
- Producer: Frank B. Walker

"I've Got the Key to the Kingdom" is a gospel blues song recorded in 1929 by Washington Phillips (1880–1954, vocals and zither).

The song consists of several verses and a refrain:

I've got the key to the kingdom,
And the Devil can't do me no harm.

The verses relate to the Biblical story of Daniel in the lions' den, and his deliverance from it; found in the Book of Daniel at Chapter 6.

Phillips' song may be a variant of a traditional gospel song. "Key to the Kingdom" by Bessie Johnson and the Sanctified Singers (1929, 10-inch 78 rpm single Okeh 8725) consists almost entirely of a similar refrain. "Got a Key to the Kingdom" by Josh White (1935, 10-inch 78 rpm single Melotone 5-11-60 and simultaneous releases) has the same tune and a similar refrain, but very different verses.

== Recordings ==
- 1929 – Washington Phillips
- 1929 – Blind Willie Davis (song titled as "I've Got a Key to the Kingdom") on Paramount Records

== See also ==
- Keys of the Kingdom (disambiguation)
