= The Key to the Kingdom =

Japanese manga series written and illustrated by Kyoko Shitou

王国の鍵 (Ōkoku no Kagi)
- Genre: Adventure, fantasy
- Manga
- Written by: Kyoko Shitou
- Published by: Kadokawa Shoten
- English publisher: NA: CMX
- Magazine: Asuka Fantasy DX
- Original run: March 29, 2003 – December 25, 2004
- Volumes: 6

The Key to the Kingdom (王国の鍵, Ōkoku no Kagi) is a Japanese manga series written and illustrated by Kyoko Shitou. The manga was serialised in Kadokawa Shoten's Asuka Fantasy DX. The manga is licensed and published in North America by CMX and in Taiwan by Kadokawa Shoten's subsidiary Kadokawa Media.

== Manga ==
Kadokawa Shoten released the manga's 6 bound volumes between March 29, 2003, and December 25, 2004. CMX released the manga's 6 tankōbon volumes between September 19, 2007, and December 30, 2008.

== Plot ==
There once was a great nation, comprising Certes in the north, Romul in the east and Landor in the middle. Three men battled over the right to the throne; as a result, a civil war broke out and the nation was split into three. After 300 years, the war between the split countries continues. In one of those wars, the King and Prince, Winslott, of Landor fall in battle, leaving the burden of governing the country to the young Prince Astarion. Unlike his brother, who participated in wars and was admired for his courage, Astarion has little interest in learning to hold the sword. His unwillingness to succeed the throne is the cause to allow the quest for The Key to The Kingdom, a legendary item that would grant the one who finds it the right to be crowned King. In this quest, those of royal blood can take part, and if one finds the key within two years time, he or she will become the ruler. Otherwise the throne will pass to Prince Astarion. He too participates in this quest half-hearted, with no enthusiasm at all, because he only cares about ending the conflict peacefully with no bloodshed and despair.

== Reception ==
Casey Brienza from Anime News Network commends the manga for its "exquisite artwork, entertaining storyline and characters". A later review by Casey Brienza criticises the manga for ending the series "a bit rushed, so the series does not end as strongly as it should have" but also commends the manga for "brilliant high fantasy storyline and breathtaking art".

In 2009, The Key to the Kingdom was listed as Great Graphic Novels for Teens by the Young Adult Library Services Association.
