= Blind Willie Davis =

American musician

Blind Willie Davis (c. 1890s – 1930s) was an American blind gospel blues singer who recorded in the 1920s.

Davis recorded six sides for Paramount Records in 1928 and 1929. He sang solo and played slide guitar in a blues influenced style similar to that of Blind Willie Johnson. His material was strictly religious in nature and relied on reworkings of traditional hymns such as "Rock of Ages". He is noted for his versions of "When the Saints Go Marching In" and "I've Got a Key to the Kingdom", a song previously recorded by Washington Phillips and Bessie Johnson. Davis' version is radically reworked and stripped down to a powerful but simple slide guitar riff repeated at a fast tempo with the lyrics reduced to a basic chorus and apparently improvised lyrics. He sang in an emotional and somewhat slurred voice. Davis' other songs are of a similar nature although at a somewhat slower tempo and less intense pace.

Davis is a mysterious figure about whom little is known. Research done by Gayle Dean Wardlow in 1966 named his home as Bude, Mississippi, a small town in the southwest of the state. He reportedly was reluctant to record fearing he would be required to play secular material. He did not record again and his subsequent whereabouts and death are unknown. No photos of him are known to exist.

Davis' complete recorded works are available on Document Records.
