= VS (1999 manga) =

Japanese manga series

- First English edition of VS, published by CMX

VS バーサス (VS Bāsasu)
- Genre: Romance, Music
- Manga
- Written by: Keiko Yamada
- Published by: Akita Shoten
- English publisher: NA: CMX
- Magazine: Princess Comics
- Original run: June 1999 – December 24, 2001
- Volumes: 7

VS (VS バーサス, VS Bāsasu; a.k.a. "Versus") is a Japanese manga written and illustrated by Keiko Yamada. It was serialized in Akita Shoten's shōjo magazine (aimed at teenage girls) Princess Comics. The individual chapters were released in 7 tankōbon volumes between June 1999 and December 24, 2001. The series is licensed in North America by CMX, which released the manga's 7 tankōbon volumes between April 1, 2006, and October 10, 2007. The story follows violinist, Reiji Saioin, as he strives to win the next Japanese National Music Contest with the help of his personal teacher, Mitsuko Hane, and his friends, Nachi Meiya and Aoi Kenzaki. Impeding his goal is Bartholomew Asakura, who ruined Hane's arm in the past, and his growing feelings for his teacher.

== Plot ==
Reiji Saioin, the top violinist in Hakuto Junior High School, is to be kicked out of the school if he does not win the next Japan National Music Contest due to his history of trouble. His private teacher and alum of Hakuto, Mitsuko Hane, is willing to help Reiji overcome his flaws to win the music contest. She wants Reiji to play the violin because she cannot due to her left arm being rendered useless after being burnt. Reiji has his own wishes to keep his sister, Miruka, who is abused by their father, happy. Along the way to win the music contest, Reiji becomes friends with Nachi Meiya, the best female violinist in Hakuto, and Aoi Kenzaki, a pianist-turned-violinist. He also has to deal with Bartholomew Asakura, the man who ruined Hane's arm, as well as his growing feelings for his teacher.

== Characters ==
- Reiji Saioin is the protagonist of the series. He is the best male violinist of Hakuto Junior High School. However, he has a reputation for being Hakuto's "trouble student". He is notorious for treating women like trash and changing girlfriends frequently. After Aoi comes under Hane's student, Reiji covers for Aoi's health problems until Hane reveals Aoi's doctor order for him to retire from the violin. He later realises his growing feelings for his teacher, Hane, and declines Nachi's confession to him.
- Mitsuko Hane is Reiji's and later, Aoi's, private teacher. She is an alum of Hakuto Junior High School and has won the Japan National Music Contest twice consecutively. However, after her mother's death, she got emotionally involved with fellow violinist Bartholomew. The pressure for her to win the contest a third time and her unrequited love for Bartholomew, resulted in a fire accident, burning her left arm, effectively disabling her from playing the violin. She spent the next four years in hospital. Afterwards, she became a music teacher. She later was chosen to be Reiji's teacher. She still has affections for Bartholomew after what he did to her.
- Nachi Meiya is the best female violinist at Hakuto Junior High School. She has won the Japan National Music Contest once. She has an outgoing and carefree attitude. Later, Reiji discovers that the attitude she has is a facade to hide the pain she feels from her stepbrother sexually assaulting her. After Reiji stops her brother by punching him she confesses her love to Reiji, who declines her confession. However, she comes back for the next Japan National Music Contest and is supportive of Reiji and her love of him despite knowing that he loves Hane.
- Marco Primavera (aka. "Maestro" or "the Grim Reaper") is the chief conductor of Hakuto's Philharmonic Orchestra. He has known Hane since she was three and regards her as his daughter. He scouted Bartholomew Asakura to be his successor but soon changed his mind after Bartholomew caused Hane's arm to be burnt. Even the principal of the school dares not to challenge him. He is known as the Grim Reaper for crushing the careers of thousands of musicians.
- Miruka Saioin is Reiji's half-sister. She was the victim of her father's alcoholic rage when Reiji left for boarding school. When her father becomes imprisoned, she is willing to go to America with her adopted parents to not cause her brother any more trouble.
- Aoi Kenzaki was a world-class pianist from a family of pianists. However, he changed to violin and was chosen to be taught by Hane. Due to his heart condition, he cannot play the violin for extended periods of time and has to take his medication periodically. He ignores warnings about his health from his doctor as well as his family to strive to become acknowledged as a violinist. After losing a contest to play all three movements of Beethoven's Kreutzer against Reiji, he renounces the violin and returns to his manor in Kyoto, where he takes up gardening.
- Bartholomew Asakura was a young conductor that Hakuto's conductor had scouted. When Hane's mother died, she turned to him for comfort. He uses her love for him to teach her violin techniques. However, after the fire accident, he disappeared from Hane's life. He is known for his genius in teaching his students but they usually commit suicide or their lives ruined after Bartholomew is done with them. After he becomes the conductor of the New York Philharmonic Orchestra, he attempts to make Reiji join him. When Reiji is revealed to be his son, he refuses to acknowledge it because he does not want a child.

== Production and releases ==
VS is written and illustrated by Keiko Yamada. It was serialized in Akita Shoten's shōjo magazine (aimed at teenage girls) Princess Comics. The individual chapters were released in 7 tankōbon volumes between June 1999 and December 24, 2001. The series is licensed in North America by CMX, which released the manga's 7 tankōbon volumes between April 1, 2006, and October 10, 2007.

Manga artist Yamada comments that "there was so much love in Go Go Heaven (her previous series) that I got sick of it" and created Versus as a "stoic story of self-denial". She also comments that she focuses more on the hand and the backs of male characters when she draws them because they "can tell more about the character's feelings than the faces, so when I want to show that they are full of sadness or passion, I use that". Yamada comments that she uses the "playmate version of model dolls" (drawing models based on Playboy models) to draw Mitsuko Hane due to her "big chest".

== Reception ==
Mania.com's Eduardo M. Chavez comments that Keiko Yamada's art is "classic shōjo. Characters are big headed, big eyed and practically everyone has feminine qualities. About that, until I actually the first chapter I did not realize that the main character was male." Chavez compares the manga to the television series, 24, where "every hour of every day must be utilized to its fullest". He also compares VS to Nodame Cantabile, saying, "Nodame uses comedy to bring life to music than can be considered dry to younger readers. VS uses angst to do much of same." Mania.com's Jarred Pine criticises the manga for the "SFX [which] are translated with overlays, only sometimes the underlying Japanese text is not removed. I've seen this with quite a few CMX titles and it makes for a very ugly looking job." Pine also criticises the characters, saying "The biggest strike against VS is the complete lack of any interesting, likeable, or memorable characters. The lead, Reiji, is a complete smug and arrogant fool right from the beginning. While creator Keiko Yamada does try to humanize him a bit with a back story of familial abuse, it's quickly shooed aside and has little effect on the reader." Manga Life's Dan Polley comments that "Reiji’s character — like most shōjo manga — is the focus, and deservedly so. The character is hot-tempered, yet is able to retain a bit of aloofness, especially in [volume six]. Those types of personality traits are generally excellently fleshed out in shōjos, and particularly in this volume."

"VS continues to be a bit of a struggle, mostly because the whole angst-driven character drama just isn't working for me because it's falls to much on two characters that just aren't that interesting. While I enjoy anti-heroes, it takes meticulous time and effort to properly deconstruct and then rebuild a character that will appeal to the reader. Creator Keiko Yamada just seems to want to rush this all important piece, leaving me feeling quite cold and distant from not just Reiji, but quite honestly everyone." - Jarred Pine, Mania.com
