= Tsukasa Kotobuki =

Japanese character designer

- ことぶき つかさ
- Born: April 28, 1970 (age 56); Tokyo, Japan
- Occupation: Anime character designer

Tsukasa Kotobuki (ことぶき つかさ, Kotobuki Tsukasa; born 1970) is a Japanese character designer for various games and anime series such as Saber Marionette J, VS Knight Lamune & 40 Fire, Cyber Team in Akihabara and Battle Arena Toshinden. He also did the art for Sword of the Dark Ones. His real name is unknown; his title name is rather a pen name, majorly derived from animator Tsukasa Dokite.

In 2001, he attended A-Kon as a guest. In 2003, he attended Otakon as a guest.

== Biography ==
Around the age of nine and attending fourth grade, Tsukasa was introduced to anime with the initial series of Mobile Suit Gundam, and was further inspired to go into anime upon the release of Mobile Suit Z Gundam in his second year of middle school. After going to his first Comiket, by the time of 1985, Tsukasa began his career as a manga artist through dojinshi circles, particularly through junior high and high school fanzine anthologies under the initial pseudonym Sushi (「 寿司 」). His current pseudonym is derived from the pronunciations of the individual kanji that make up the compound for the Japanese word for "sushi." His talents and connections with editors during his high school career allowed him to land work with illustrations for commercial design and general staff work for anime studios and manga circles; by the age of twenty, he became an apprentice of Kenichi Sonoda. After his apprenticeship in 1994, his friend Masami Obari, whose then current projects were that of the Fatal Fury OVA movies, let him work on staff as the off action wardrobe and character designer for Fatal Fury: The Motion Picture.

== Inspiration and Style ==
His art style is largely influenced particularly from series Mobile Suit Gundam and Megazone 23, and fellow superiors in the industry, such as Tsukasa Dokite, Masamune Shirow, Masakazu Katsura, Kenichi Sonoda, and Masami Obari. Tsukasa's 1990s anime style works are defined as wild, making the use of vivid colors and soft but stark contrasting shades, and somewhat exaggerated features of human anatomy along with realistic features, including that of puffed up cheeks, which he helped launch into popularity as they were in style at the time for defining cute characters and aesthetics. Into the current day, his style is defined by more subdued but more flowing coloring and an emphasis on darker and thicker lining work.

== Personal life ==
Outside of work in the anime industry, Tsukasa is a lifelong fan of Gundam and video games, particularly of King of Fighters and Pokémon. He occasionally does doujinshi in his spare time, sometimes of adult oriented parodies, under different pseudonyms, such as Noriharu or Gym Leader.

== Works ==
=== Manga ===
- Go! Go! Bokurano V Gundam!! (Go! Go! Our Victory Gundam!!)
- Mechanical Man Blues (overseas exclusive manga series, 1994, unfinished)
- Cyber Team in Akihabara pattern Pi!
- Ragnarok/Sword of the Dark Ones
- Mobile Suit Gundam Z: The Day After Tomorrow: Kai's Reports
  - Mobile Suit Gundam Z: Kai's Memories

=== Anime ===
- Fatal Fury: The Motion Picture (co-character designer, costume design, key animator)
- Battle Arena Toshinden (character designer)
- VS Knight Lamune & 40 Fire (character designer)
- Cyber Team In Akihabara (character designer)
- Saber Marionette J (light novel illustrations, character design concept for the anime)
- Godannar (co-mechanical designer)
- Dante's Inferno
- Super Robot Wars Original Generation: The Inspector (mechanical design: Angelg and Valsione)
- Mobile Suit Gundam: THE ORIGIN (character designer, lead animation director)
- City Hunter: Shinjuku Private Eyes (character designer for the Kisugi sisters, animation director)
- City Hunter: Angel Dust (character designer for the Kisugi sisters)
- Mayonaka Punch (original character designer)
- I'm the Evil Lord of an Intergalactic Empire! (Mechanical Design)

=== Movies ===
- Mobile Suit Gundam: Silver Phantom

=== Video games ===
- Battle Arena Toshinden- Official Illustrator
  - Battle Arena Toshinden Remix (Toshinden S)
  - Battle Arena Toshinden 2
  - Battle Arena Toshinden URA
  - Battle Arena Toshinden 3
  - Nitoushinden
  - Puzzle Arena Toshinden
  - Toshinden Card Quest
  - Toshinden Next (cancelled installment)
  - Battle Arena Toshinden 4
- Saber Marionette J· Battle Sabers
- Galaxy Fräulein Yuna 3: Lightning Angel
- Thousand Arms
- Cyber Team in Akihabara Pata Pies!
- No More Heroes: Heroes' Paradise

=== Music ===
- Gundam Song Covers (2019)
- Gundam Song Covers 2 (2020)
