= Keys of the Kingdom (disambiguation) =

The keys of the kingdom is a Christian concept of eternal church authority.

(The) Keys of the Kingdom may also refer to:

- Keys of the Kingdom, 1991 studio album by The Moody Blues
- The Keys of Heaven used in ecclesiastical heraldry
- The Keys of the Kingdom, 1941 novel by A. J. Cronin
  - The Keys of the Kingdom (film), 1944 film based on the Cronin novel

== See also ==
- Keys to the Kingdom (disambiguation)
