= Kyoko Ariyoshi =

Japanese shōjo manga artist (born 1950)

Kyōko Ariyoshi 有吉 京子
- Born: 有吉 京子; September 14, 1950 (age 76) Kumamoto City, Kumamoto Prefecture, Japan
- Area: Manga artist
- Notable works: Swan

Kyōko Ariyoshi (有吉 京子, Ariyoshi Kyōko; born September 14, 1950) is a Japanese shōjo manga artist. She is well known for her works of ballet manga stories.

Ariyoshi's representative work is Swan (21 volumes, Part 1, 1977–1980, and Part 2, 1980–1981), which depicted the heroine Masumi's growing up to the world-famous ballerina and got the great hit, won the high reputation among readers. Ariyoshi's other representative works are Swan -The Prayer of Swan- (1982–1983) and Applause which also depicted growing up of the young ballerinas with talent and potential.

== Life and works ==
Ariyoshi was born in Kumamoto City, Kumamoto Prefecture. She started contributions of her stories to commercial manga magazine and received letter of encouragement from editor of magazine. After graduation of high school, she went to Tokyo when she was 19. Next year, she made her debut with her work Kitty and a Girl (Koneko to Shōjo) in Weekly Margaret in 1971.

In 1976, she started the story Swan in the weekly Margaret, 1976, 47th issue. magazine. The story completed after five years.

=== Selected manga works ===
Title	Year	Volume and Label	Refs
Swan	1976–81	Serialized in Margaret magazine Shueisha (21 volumes)	
Apurōzu - kassai (アプローズ喝采, Applause - Kassai)	1997–99	Akita Comics Elegance (6 volumes)	
Nijinsukī gūwa (ニジンスキー寓話, Nijinsky Fable)	1987–90	Serialized in Bouquet; Bouquet Comics (5 volumes)	
Swan Act II	2006–09	(4 volumes)	
Seishun kikku ofu! (青春キック・オフ!, Youth Kick Off)	1977–78	(3 volumes)	
Hakuchō no inori (白鳥の祈り, Swan of Prayer)	1983	Margaret comics (3 volumes)	
Kaedama wa okotowari! (かえ玉はおことわり!チャーリーの冒険の巻)	1976	Margaret Comics (2 volumes)	
Sensē ni keirei! (センセーに敬礼!, Salute to the Sensei)	1973	Margaret Comics (2 volumes)	
Kyūseishu nyūmon (救世主入門, Messiah Introduction)	1994	Princess Comics (2 volumes)	
Kaze no yume, Hana no yume (風の夢花の夢, Dream of wind, Dream of flower)	1986	Margaret Comics (2 volumes)	
Ijippari dai sakusen! ! (意地っぱり大作戦!!, Obstinate Operation !!)	1975	Margaret Comics (1 volume)	
Tobe! Pegasasu (飛べ!ペガサス, Fly! Pegasus)	1976	Margaret Rainbow Comics (1 volume)	
Reira kara no tegami (麗羅からの手紙, Letter from Reira)	1983	Margaret Comics (1 volume)	
Shiroi mori no kettō (白い森の決闘, Duel in the White forest)	1977	Margaret Rainbow Comics (1 volume)	
Bejitaburu sarada (べじたぶる・サラダ, Vegetable Salad)	1984	Margaret Comics (1 volume)	
Vu~aruna korekushon (ヴァルナ・コレクション, Varna Collection)	1985	Margaret Comics (1 volume)	
Nani kusottensai! (なにクソッ天才!, What Damn, Genius!)	1972	Margaret Comics (1 volume)	
Mō semara-naide! (もうセマらないで!, Do not close anymore!)	1974	Margaret Comics (1 volume)	
Kaedama wa okotowari! (かえ玉はおことわり!)	2004	Futaba Paperback (1 volume)	
Apurōzu dai 2-bu kassai (アプローズ 第2部喝采, Applause Part 2: Kassai)	1986	(1 volume)	
Burūju apurōzu (ブルージュアプローズ, Bruges Applause)	1992	Princess Comics (1 volume)	
Yume messēji (夢・メッセージ, Dream and Messages)	1988	Margaret Comics (1 volume)	
Ariyoshi kyōko jisen-shū (有吉京子自選集, Kyoko Ariyoshi Author's Edition)	1996	KC Deluxe (5 volumes)	

=== Artbook ===
- Ballet Dancer (バレエ・ダンサー), Shinsho-kan January, 1986
- Ariyoshi Kyoko Gashū SWAN (有吉京子画集 SWAN), Heibonsha Co.Ltd. July, 2023

== Reception ==
Ariyoshi's manga work "Swan" was highly evaluated. It is considered the monument of ballet manga. Total sales of this series is over 20 millions copies.
