= Yuri Narushima =

Japanese manga artist

Yuri Narushima (なるしま ゆり, Narushima Yuri) is a Japanese manga artist best known for her series Planet Ladder, licensed in English by Tokyopop, and The Young Magician, licensed in English by CMX. Narushima is a member of the dōjinshi circle Comodo.

== Bibliography ==
=== Manga ===
- Replica Master (1996, Shinshokan)
- The Young Magician (1996–2005, serialized in Wings Comics, Shinshokan)
- Genjuu Bunsho (1996–2005, serialized in Wings Comics, Shinshokan)
- Planet Ladder (1998–2003, serialized in Crimson, Sobisha/Shueisha)
- Shinazu No Agito (2000–2004, serialized in Ultra Jump, Shueisha)
- Shounen Kaiki (2000–2005, serialized in Asuka, Kadokawa Shoten)
- Tetsuichi (2005–present, serialized in Comic Zero Sum, Ichijinsha)
- Hakka Haien no Shujin to Shitsuji (2007, serialized in Asuka, Kadokawa Shoten)
- Light Novel (ライトノベル, 2010–2012)
- Boku to Utsukushiki Bengoshi no Bōken (ぼくと美しき弁護士の冒険, 2013–present)
