= I Hate You More than Anyone =

Japanese manga series

世界でいちばん大嫌い (Sekai de Ichiban Daikirai)
- Genre: Romance
- Manga
- Written by: Banri Hidaka
- Published by: Hakusensha
- English publisher: NA: CMX
- Original run: 1998 – 2001
- Volumes: 13

I Hate You More than Anyone (世界でいちばん大嫌い, Sekai de Ichiban Daikirai; lit. "The World's Most Detestable") is a Japanese shōjo manga written and illustrated by Banri Hidaka.

== Plot summary ==
Akiyoshi Kazuha is the responsible oldest daughter in a large family. She attends an all-girls high school with her best friend Senko and has a crush on her little brother's kindergarten teacher. During her high school festival, she is shocked when a handsome hairstylist, Sugimoto Maki, who's helping at the festival, makes it obvious that he's interested in her. Complicating matters are Senko's infatuation with Maki, which makes Kazuha feel guilty about her developing feelings. The story also deals with several other relationships in Kazuha and Maki's group of friends.

== Characters ==
=== Main characters ===
Akiyoshi Kazuha
Eldest daughter (also eldest child) of the Akiyoshi family. She takes care of her five younger siblings while her parents are at work. She's a beautiful girl who's admired by many other girls.
Sugimoto Maki
A friend of Mizushima, who seems to be Kazuha's first crush. When they first meet, he says he loves her hair, and wishes to style her hair very much. Mizushima, Honjo Tohru and he are best friends, and the other two of the trio credit him as the most carefree of the group.

=== Supporting characters ===
==== Akiyoshi family ====
Akiyoshi Chizuru
Eldest son (second child). He's at a rebellious age and does some strange things.
Akiyoshi Momoka
Second daughter (third child). She usually makes fun of her big sister.
Akiyoshi Tonami
Third daughter (fourth child). Kazuha loves her very much and always does as she wishes.
Akiyoshi Ichihisa
Second son (fifth child). He often makes a fool of Kazuha.
Akiyoshi Rei
Third son (sixth and last child). He attends Sakura kindergarten.

==== Nishimiya Female Senior High ====
The school which Kazuha attends.

Matsuoka Senko
Kazuha's best friend.
Ishizuka Asako
Kazuha and Senko's friend. She often takes their photos to sell for goods.
Sugimoto Saki
Second elder brother of Maki. He is the teacher of Kazuha's class at Nishimiya. He is eager to do everything to ruin Maki's happiness. His name used to be Kawasumi Saki (his mother's surname).

==== Kita-hojo Senior High ====
Takasaki
Asako's boyfriend. Like his girlfriend, he sells Arata's pictures for goods.
Inukai Miharu
A former friend of Kazuha. She is now in the same school as Arata.

==== Sakura Kindergarten ====
Mizushima Tohru
Kindergarten teacher. Kazuha's first crush. He is called the devil by Maki and Honjo (inside of the trio only).
Yamamoto Manami
Mizushima's fiancée.

==== Sugimoto Yuuki's Salon ====
Sugimoto Yuuki
The eldest brother of Maki.
Sugimoto Makako
Yuuki's wife.
Fujisawa Eiji
New member of the Salon. He is a super lazy man.
Fujisawa Eiko
Eiji's little sister. She is a top student at a Beauty College.

==== Honjou Salon ====
Honjou Miyabi
Arata and Toru's Mother. She seems to like academic, beautiful girls.
Honjou Tohru
Arata's big brother and Maki's close friend. Because his given name is the same as his friend Mizushima (Tohru), the trio call them by their surname to distinguish the two.
Honjou Arata
Honjou Toru's little brother. He has a crush on Kazuha. He attends Kita Senior High.
Katsura Minari
She sometimes seems to be losing souls.
Moritaka Risa
She seems to hate Maki very much. Because her former workpal Nishina quit, she seems to also hate Kazuha because of her friendship with Nishina.
Nishina Sachie
Moritaka's former workpal.
Shiraishi Azumi
She was Maki's first crush, but she had a deep crush on Maki's father, Kiichi. Formerly working at Sugimoto Salon, she then moved to work at Honjou Salon and live together with Maki at Grandma Sophie's house. She committed suicide.

==== Sugimoto Kiichi's Salon ====
Family of Maki, Yuuki, Saki.

Sugimoto Kiichi
Father of Maki. He has a weakness for women.
Sugimoto Karen
Mother of Maki. A photographer.
Sakuma Sophie
Grandmother of Maki.
Kai
Fujisawa Shouichi
Eldest brother of Fujisawa Eiji and Eiko.
Kamiya

== Related manga ==
- 365-nichi no Koibito
- Owaranai Koi no tame ni
- Ari no mama no Kimi de ite
- Uta wo Kitasete
