= Smile (magazine) =

American teenage magazine

- Categories: Pop Culture, Anime/Manga, and Lifestyle
- Frequency: Bi-monthly
- Founder: Stuart J. Levy
- First issue: October 1998; 27 years ago
- Final issue Number: July 2002; 24 years ago Vol 4 No 1
- Company: Tokyopop
- Country: United States
- Based in: Los Angeles
- Language: English
- Website: smilegear.com
- OCLC: 39626569

Smile was a magazine aimed at teenage girls. The magazine was started in 1998. At first it was supposed to be a mainstream teen mag similar to Seventeen, but with added manga; later, it became more focused on manga and removed most of its other features. It was published by Tokyopop based in Los Angeles. The magazine was discontinued in 2002.

Sailor Moon, Peach Girl, and Juline were serialized in the magazine. Sailor Moon was originally serialized in MixxZine but Mixx moved it to Smile because Mixx wanted to refocus MixxZine towards high school and university/college-aged readers. Smile serialized the Dream story arc, while earlier story arcs not finished in MixxZine were finished in individual comic book publications.

== See also ==
- List of manga magazines published outside of Japan
