= Nari Kusakawa =

Japanese manga artist

- Born: Aichi Prefecture
- Occupation: Manga artist
- Known for: The Recipe for Gertrude
- Website: kusakawanari.com

Nari Kusakawa (草川 為, Kusakawa Nari; born 26 December in Aichi Prefecture) is the pen name of a Japanese manga artist who created The Recipe for Gertrude, Palette of 12 Secret Colors, and Two Flowers of the Dragon. Her real name has not been made public.

She debuted in 2000 with the short story My Grandfather (マイ グランド ファーザー), published in the manga magazine LaLa DX.
