= Sword of the Dark Ones =

Japanese manga series

ラグナロク (Ragunaroku)
- Genre: Dark fantasy
- Manga
- Written by: Kentaro Yasui
- Illustrated by: Tsukasa Kotobuki
- Published by: Kadokawa Shoten
- English publisher: NA: CMX
- Magazine: Monthly Shōnen Ace
- Original run: 2000 – 2003
- Volumes: 3

Sword of the Dark Ones, known in Japan as Ragnarok (Japanese: ラグナロク, Hepburn: Ragunaroku), is a Japanese manga series illustrated by Tsukasa Kotobuki. Based on a novel written by Kentaro Yasui, the series was serialized in Kadokawa Shoten's Monthly Shōnen Ace magazine from 2000 to 2003, with its individual chapters collected into three volumes.

== Plot ==
Set in the fictional Ragnarok continent, which includes the Asgard Empire, people live their lives in constant fear as the land is overrun by flesh-eating monsters known as "The Dark Ones". They roam the land and hunt from the darkness killing indiscriminately. To combat this threat, a guild of mercenaries was formed. One man in particular has built a reputation as an especially fierce monster-killer, a man known as Leroy Schwartz, or the Black Lightning. He is a man with a mission to accomplish and a vow to fulfill, his only companionship lying in his sentient long-sword Ragnarok.

== Characters ==
Leroy Schwartz (リロイ・シュヴァルツァー, Riroi Shuvuarutsuā)
Leroy has super-human speed, strength, and stamina. He is accompanied by his sentient sword, Ragnarok. He is quick-thinking, though sometimes he can be irrational. He despises those who kill for no motive other than profit. He keeps sealed within him an immense power, along with feelings of isolation from other humans because he is a Demon. The power within him only manifests itself forcefully whenever Leroy sustains critical damage.
Ragnarok (ラグナロク, Ragunaroku)
Leroy's sentient sword. Ragnarok is cautious and calculating, making him a perfect foil of Leroy. In times of danger, Ragnarok is able to manifest himself in human form.
Lena Northlight (レナ・ノースライト, Rena Nōsuraito)
An assassin who kills without regret or hesitation. She seems cold-hearted and fierce, but bears a soft spot for her kid sister. She asks Leroy to help find her sister, who is held captive in the Crimson Despair's headquarters.

== Publication ==
Illustrated by Tsukasa Kotobuki, the manga is based on a novel series by Kentaro Yasui. It was serialized in Kadokawa Shoten's Monthly Shōnen Ace magazine from 2000 to 2003. Its individual chapters were collected into three tankōbon volumes.

In December 2004, CMX announced that they licensed the manga for English publication. The first print run of the first volume was censored for nudity; subsequent print runs removed the censorship.

== Reception ==
Julie Rosato of Mania liked the short length and action scenes, describing it as "a step above the regular crop of teen titles". Michael Deeley of Manga Life liked the story, though he also felt fight scenes were "confusing". In Manga: The Complete Guide, Jason Thompson felt the art lacked detail and that the story was "predictable" and "poorly structured".
