= Zettai =

Zettai (絶対, Zettai, lit. "absolute") may refer to:

- Zettai Fukuju Meirei, a game set in Postwar West Germany, known as Absolute Obedience in English
- Zettai Heiwa Daisakusen, a shōjo manga written by Akane Ogura
- Zettai Karen Children, a Japanese shōnen manga
- Zettai Kareshi TV, a live adaptation based on the manga Absolute Boyfriend on Fuji TV in 2008
- Zettai Muteki Raijin-Oh, a 51 episode Japanese anime television series
- Zettai Zetsumei Toshi 3, the third game in the disaster series known as Disaster Report in the US
- Zettai ryōiki, a phrase that refers to the area of exposed skin between a miniskirt and thigh-high socks
