= The Beloved Imperial Bride =

Japanese manga series

- First tankōbon volume cover

帝国の恋嫁 (Teikoku no Koiyome)
- Genre: Isekai; Romantic fantasy
- Manga
- Written by: Mato Kauta
- Published by: Hakusensha
- English publisher: NA: Comikey
- Imprint: Hana to Yume Comics
- Magazine: LaLa
- Original run: March 24, 2022 – present
- Volumes: 9

The Beloved Imperial Bride (帝国の恋嫁, Teikoku no Koiyome) is a Japanese manga series written and illustrated by Mato Kauta. It was originally published as a one-shot in Hakusensha's shōjo manga magazine LaLa DX in August 2021. It later began serialization in the LaLa magazine in March 2022.

== Synopsis ==
During the moment when Liliel's marriage to the Crown Prince Rudeus was confirmed, the protagonist started remembering that she was reincarnated as Liliel, the villainess of a web novel she read in her past life. In order to avoid the fate that Liliel faced in the end, she tries to get Rudeus to divorce her, but he becomes more infatuated with her.

== Characters ==
Liliel (リリエル, Ririeru)
Voiced by: Aoi Koga (voice drama)
Rudeus (ルディウス, Rudiusu)
Voiced by: Soma Saito (voice drama)

== Media ==
=== Manga ===
Written and illustrated by Mato Kauta, The Beloved Imperial Bride was originally published as a one-shot in Hakusensha's shōjo manga magazine LaLa DX on August 10, 2021. It later began serialization in the LaLa magazine on March 24, 2022. The series is set to end serialization on November 24, 2026. Its chapters have been collected in nine tankōbon volumes as of July 2026.

The series is licensed in English by Comikey.

No.	Original release date	Original ISBN	North American release date	North American ISBN
1	July 5, 2022	978-4-592-22131-9	August 15, 2025	979-8-892-20133-9
Chapters 0–2; Special Chapter
2	December 5, 2022	978-4-592-22132-6	October 15, 2025	979-8-892-20205-3
Chapters 3–7; Bonus
3	June 5, 2023	978-4-592-22133-3	December 15, 2025	979-8-892-20213-8
Chapters 8–12; Bonus
4	December 5, 2023	978-4-592-22134-0	February 15, 2026	979-8-892-20218-3
Chapters 13–16; Special Chapters 1–2; Bonus
5	June 5, 2024	978-4-592-22135-7	July 1, 2026	979-8-892-20239-8
Chapters 17–21; Extra Chapter: "The Dream"
6	November 5, 2024	978-4-592-22206-4	—	—
7	June 5, 2025	978-4-592-22207-1	—	—
8	January 5, 2026	978-4-592-22208-8	—	—
9	July 3, 2026	978-4-592-22209-5	—	—

=== Other ===
A voice drama adaptation was included in the June 2023 edition of LaLa released on April 24, 2023. The voice drama included voice performances from Aoi Koga and Soma Saito.
