= Wanted (manga) =

Manga by Matsuri Hino

- The cover of Wanted
- Manga
- Written by: Matsuri Hino
- Published by: Hakusensha
- English publisher: AUS: Madman Entertainment; NA: Viz Media
- Published: January 5, 2005

Wanted is a single-volume Japanese shōjo manga written and illustrated by Matsuri Hino, author of Vampire Knight. The three-chapter work was published by Hakusensha on January 5, 2005. Viz Media released an English language edition in North America on September 2, 2008. It is licensed for regional language releases in Italy by J POP, in Germany by Carlsen Verlag and in Singapore by Chuang Yi.

== Plot ==
Armeria is an orphaned singer. She fell in love with Luce, the Governor-General's nephew, but he was kidnapped by the pirate Skulls.

Eight years later, she disguises herself as a boy named "Alto" and joins Skulls' crew to search for Luce, but they quickly discover her gender. She reveals that she has come to find Luce, only to be told by Skulls that Luce had killed himself long ago. She refuses to believe him. Skulls and his crew attack another ship, and Armeria is disgusted by the violence.

At a nearby port, she is surprised to see the townspeople welcome the pirates. She discovers that Skulls is an ally to the common people. When she confronts Skulls, he tells her that the stories are fake, and that she will not find Luce in the town.

The ship is attacked and Armeria is taken hostage. Despite her belief that Skulls will not care about her, he offers his life in exchange for her safety. Skulls calls her by her real name, and Armeria realizes that Skulls is Luce. Armeria learns that Luce, having regretted being unable to help the peasants his uncle stole from, decided to become a pirate who would help the weak. Despite her shock at Luce having become so violent, Armeria stays and becomes a member of the crew.

Luce decides that they get information about the Navy. Armeria offers to ask around at the next town, but Luce refuses. Angered, Armeria gets a job in a brothel. She is accosted by a drunk and saved by Luce. He demands to know how she planned to find the information they need. When she refuses to answer, he threatens to "buy" her every night until she gives up. Furious, she storms out of the room, and is caught by the Navy.

Armeria is imprisoned, escapes, and runs into the commander and his men. Skulls and his crew rescue her. That night, Armeria learns that Luce sold his treasured golden statue for money to buy her at the brothel, and she realizes that he cares for her more than he is willing to let on.

Some time later, Armeria learns that Luce possesses a map leading to the legendary "Devil's Score", a beautiful but cursed piece of music. Armeria tries to convince Luce to find the score for her, fails, and points out that he would be able to sell it for a lot of money, changing his mind.

Armeria and Luce search for the score in a cave, only to run into the same commander who captured Armeria previously. He has been sent to the island to find the score for an aristocrat, and uses Armeria as a hostage to get Luce to fetch the treasure for him, as the chest is booby-trapped. The roof caves in, a falling rock triggers a booby trap of poisoned arrows, and Luce is struck protecting Armeria. It is revealed that the commander is Luce's childhood friend, Reid. The boys were orphaned by pirates at a young age and vowed to avenge them, and Reid is disgusted to learn that Luce has become the pirate Skulls, claiming that Luce is pretending to be Robin Hood while committing crimes.

Luce collapses from the poison, and asks Armeria to sing the Devil's Score. The sound of her voice helps the crew find them. They take Luce back to the ship to be cured, and Reid lets Armeria take the Devil's Score.

== Main characters ==
Armeria
The main character. A girl who met Luce as a child. Then, several years later, she follows his trail to a pirate named Skulls and his pirate ship, disguising herself as a boy and using the name Alto. Her true gender is discovered when she is shot in the shoulder. On Skulls' ship she has some strange adventures but she discovers a secret about Skulls that makes her understand more about her first love, Luce. Although Armeria/Alto is disgusted by the pirate trade, she wants to be useful to Luce/Skulls and be close to him ("by his side"), at all times.
Luce
The Governor-General's nephew. The man Armeria loves. His parents were killed by pirates. She believes he was taken by the pirate Skulls and she goes to get him back.
Skulls
He is the true Luce and even gives himself away to Armeria by accident when he calls her by her true name. Captain of his own pirate ship. He is actually the second Captain Skulls, and loves Armeria/Alto very much, doing anything to keep her safe. He is confused on how to treat her after all of this time and how much they have both changed, but his heart is in the right place. After being raised by pirates, Luce/Skulls becomes a completely different person and despises his former identity, but sometimes accidentally acts like his old self again, only around Alto though. He regretted being unable to help the peasants his uncle stole from and decided to become a pirate who would help the weak, taking the name "Skulls" from Doc.
Reid
Commander in the navy. He was the childhood friend with Luce. His parents were also killed by pirates.
Doc
The first Captain Skulls, who kidnapped Luce eight years before the story takes place. He now serves as the ship's doctor and adviser.

== Depiction of female stereotypes ==
There are a few things in the three-chapter long story that can be viewed critically. In the first chapter, Armeria was able to follow Luce and disguise herself as a man called Alto, and from there she joins captain Skull's crew. Once the crew discovers that she is a woman, Skull begins to treat Armeria as an inconvenience and distraction to his crew. In the scene where the doctor treats her gunshot wound, the doctor was ordered by the captain to tie her foot to a rope. The argument for this decision was not to let a woman loose on a small ship full of men, which implies that Armeria is already controlled by Skull, and the story shows this by having Skull treat Armeria badly and deciding everything for her for most of the story.(pp. 20–21) This situation can be seen as an example of the phenomena explained by Richardson in "The Nature of Female Representation in Shoujo Manga", in which female characters are often placed at the mercies of male counterparts, and their position as women is thus constructed around their submission and the male aggression directed at them.

Another typical female stereotype present in the story is the female protagonist being constantly rescued by a man and having a talent for getting herself into dangerous situations, usually after trying to help the crew. An example of this is the second chapter, where the crew tries to find out why the navy is spreading so much on the sea. Skull decides to go to the island of Perrine, which is known to have a lot of navy officers, and shortly after arriving on the island the crew find out that Armeria has stolen a boat. Armeria, trying to be helpful, plans to go to the island alone and disguises herself as a waitress.(p. 75) She is then kidnapped by a navy officer who uses her to find out where Skull is. Armeria is rescued by Skull and allowed to stay on the ship. (pp. 94–95) This reoccurs throughout the manga. In shoujo manga, this male saving the opposite sex plot is very common and one of the most used stereotypes in modern manga, it can be considered sexism.
