= Penguin Revolution (manga) =

Manga by Sakura Tsukuba

- Penguin Revolution Volume 3 Cover

ペンギン 革命 (Pengin Kakumei)
- Genre: Romantic comedy, Gender bender
- Manga
- Written by: Sakura Tsukuba
- Published by: Hakusensha
- English publisher: NA: CMX Manga
- Magazine: LaLa
- Original run: 2005 – 2007
- Volumes: 7

Penguin Revolution (Japanese: ペンギン 革命, Hepburn: Pengin Kakumei) is a Japanese shōjo manga series by Sakura Tsukuba. It was serialized by Hakusensha in the shōjo manga magazine, LaLa with its collected volumes published under the Hana to Yume Comics imprint with seven complete volumes. It has been licensed in North America by CMX, an imprint of DC Comics for manga. The series is about a high school girl who disguises herself as a young man to become the manager of an actor classmate.

== Plot ==
Yukari Fujimaru is the only daughter of a quite unreliable father, and she dreams of a more reliable future, as a public official. She has a gift: she can see the potential of a person in the form of wings on their back, and by chance she sees wings on the back of one of her schoolmates, Ryouko, who is actually Ryou, one of the male actors of the famous entertainment company PEACOCK, in disguise. When Yukari's father loses his work and flees, Ryou introduces her to PEACOCK as his manager, and a totally unexpected career starts for Yukari. Through a series of twists and turns, both Ryou and Yuka are forced to put their teamwork and trust to the test.

== Characters ==
Yukari Fujimaru
The main protagonist, Yukari is a 16-year-old girl attending her first year of high school, who has a special gift of seeing star-potential of people as wings on their back. She usually stays home alone with her father out working and her mother left when Yukari was a child. Yukari's dream is to be a public officer due to her father's negligence in having a stable job. She is a good student, a talented cook, and a black belt in Aikido. Her life changed after encountering Ryou dressed up as the student council vice president in her school. Ryou suggests she work as his manager and live with him when her father abandons her due to bankruptcy. She becomes his manager after passing various tests, however she must disguise herself as a boy. Yukari is very dedicated to her work, and gets angry when someone insults her friends(namely Ryou and Aya). She and Ryou have a very close relationship. At the end of the manga ten years later, Fujimaru achieves her dream of becoming a public servant and is now a fast-track bureaucrat. However, after remeeting with Ryou, she becomes his manager again, along with the president of Peacock after Torii signs over his position to her.
Ryou Katsuragi
Seventeen-year-old Ryou is a "penguin," the lowest rank, at the talent agency PEACOCK. He is obligated to maintain a public image as a normal school girl (named "Ryouko") due to the company's policy of keeping their stars' true identities a secret. Ryou met Yukari at the backyard when a guy forced a confession upon him (not knowing that "Ryouko" was really a guy). When Yukari interrupted the scene, the guy almost attacked her, but ended up hitting Ryou who was protecting Yukari. They become good friends, even after Yukari discovers his secret. After receiving a call from her dad that he has fled, Yukari is homeless, until Ryou suggests she live with him as a manager. He lives with Yukari and Ayaori. He seems to have romantic feelings towards Yukari; in one chapter he can't stop thinking about an accidental kiss with her. Ryou is actually the son of Torii Hidemitsu and Yoko Oka. Ryou also has a lot of potential as an actor, although his wings are usually very small, there have been times when his wings become huge; usually after he is angry or hurt. In the seventh volume, he admits he is in love with Yukari after Ayaori questions him about his feelings for her. After PEACOCK disbanded in the seventh volume, Ryou moved to the U.S. with Ayaori and both won several major awards for his acting, along with Ayaori. He returns ten years later and asks Yukari to become his manager again.
Ayaori Mashiba
Top-ranked(Number 1) in the PEACOCK agency, disguised as the president at the high school with glasses and ruffled hair. Behind the disguise is a boy with good looks, impeccable talent and ability with thorough professionalism. Fortunately, he has extremely bad eyesight, so he still believes that Yukari is a male after walking in on her in the bathroom. He later finally realizes that Yukari is a girl when he walks into Yukari's room as she is changing while he is wearing contacts. However, Yukari is not yet aware that he knows that she is a girl. Ayaori may actually have romantic feelings to Yukari. He lives with Ryou and Yukari and really likes Yukari's cooking. Unbelievably, he is lazy and always drowsy, but dedicated to his acting career. As a matter of fact he is president of the student council because of his top score, but always leaves early, leaving the work to Ryou, the vice president, because he is usually useless. He has an amazing ability to control his heartbeat to act like he is dead and can also memorize scripts extremely quickly. He truly cares for both Ryou and Yukari, indirectly looking after them with elderly brother concern. His stage name is Makoto Ayaori. He is in fact the adopted son of Torii Hidemitsu after his parents died in a car accident. Ayaori's past is closely linked with Ryou, as Aya's dad was Ryou's father's best friend and counsel, and they got in a car accident in which Aya's dad died, and Ryou's mother went into a coma. After PEACOCK disbands, he and Ryo move to the U.S. and win several major awards with his acting, along with Ryou.
Hidemitsu Torii
Torii Hidemitsu is the CEO of PEACOCK. He's referred to as 'Boss'. He's usually always found with a cigarette and he's also Ryou and Ayaori's father. All three of their surnames are different because Hidemitsu took Ayaori in when his real parents died in a car accident. When Ryou was born Hidemitsu had his wife's surname, but changed it later on. Hidemitsu also has a gift similar to Fujimaru's.
Yuzuru Narazaki
Number 10 at PEACOCK. He first appears in chapter 8. He has a traditional Japanese style and often plays the roles in Historical Japanese dramas. He eventually develops feelings for Fujimaru, even though he doesn't know she's really a girl. He is a good swordsman who likes to carry a wooden sword all the time, and he enjoys camping out. In later chapters, he told Yukari that he loved her and kissed her on the lips. In the epilogue, now knowing Fujimaru is a girl, he asks her to marry him on a daily basis.
Fukatsu Shougo
Number 8 from PEACOCK, he is a cruel person who destroys anyone who gets in the way. He tried to sabotage Ryou's career but he failed.
Kohinata Kaname
He is the one who caused Fujimaru to almost resign because of him and his manager. He is also the top 1 of the crow class. Used to have completely black hair, but dyed it.
Yoko Oka
The one and only actress from PEACOCK. She is Ryou Katsuragi's mother and Torii Hidemitsu's wife. After the accident with Makoto Ayaori's dad, she went into a coma. She woke up to do a performance, but collapsed while playing in it. She actually had a tumor in her head, and after she collapsed, Yoko had her operation. It was a success, but she went into a coma again.

== Media ==
=== Manga ===
No.	Original release date	Original ISBN	English release date	English ISBN
1	April 5, 2005	4-592-18241-3	October 25, 2006	978-1-4012-1130-1
2	September 5, 2005	4-592-18242-1	January 3, 2007	978-1-4012-1131-8
3	March 4, 2006	4-592-18243-X	April 30, 2007	978-1-4012-1284-1
4	November 4, 2006	4-592-18244-8	July 31, 2007	978-1-4012-1306-0
5	April 5, 2007	978-4-592-18245-0	January 29, 2008	978-1-4012-1704-4
6	October 5, 2007	978-4-592-18246-7	November 11, 2008	978-1-4012-1776-1
7	February 5, 2008	978-4-592-18247-4	March 17, 2009	978-1-4012-2093-8

=== Drama CD ===
A short drama of the series was collected together with Vampire Knight and Ouran High School Host Club as a free supplement, titled as LaLa Gorgeous Drama CD in the November issue of LaLa in 2006. Tomoko Kawakami, Mitsuki Saiga and Hiroki Takahashi voiced the three main protagonists.
