= Tales of the Tendo Family =

Japanese manga series

- First tankōbon volume cover

天堂家物語 (Tendō-ke Monogatari)
- Genre: Historical, romance
- Manga
- Written by: Ken Saito
- Published by: Hakusensha
- English publisher: NA: One Peace Books
- Imprint: Hana to Yume Comics
- Magazine: LaLa DX; (August 9, 2014 – August 10, 2017); LaLa; (December 22, 2017 – present)
- Original run: August 9, 2014 – present
- Volumes: 17

Tales of the Tendo Family (天堂家物語, Tendō-ke Monogatari) is a Japanese manga series written and illustrated by Ken Saito. It was serialized in Hakusensha's shōjo manga magazine LaLa DX between August 2014 and August 2017, and was later transferred to LaLa in December 2017.

== Synopsis ==
A young orphan saves Ran Hōjō, a girl her own age destined for an arranged marriage, from drowning. After learning the girl's story and the pain that drove her to attempt suicide, she decides to pretend to be Ran and marry in her place. Her husband, Masato Tendo, however, is a cold and seemingly ruthless man, and both he and his family seem to be hiding terrible secrets.

== Characters ==
Ran (らん)
Voiced by: Rie Takahashi (voice drama)
Masato Tendo (天堂雅人, Tendō Masato)
Voiced by: Kaito Ishikawa (drama CD, voice drama)
Tachibana (立花)
Voiced by: Shin-ichiro Miki (voice drama)
Ran Hōjō (鳳城蘭, Hōjō Ran)

== Media ==
=== Manga ===
Written and illustrated by Ken Saito, Tales of the Tendo Family was initially serialized in Hakusensha's shōjo manga magazine LaLa DX from August 9, 2014, to August 10, 2017. The series was later transferred to Hakusensha's LaLa magazine on December 22, 2017. The series' chapters have been collected into seventeen tankōbon volumes as of March 2026. The series is licensed by One Peace Books for English publication.

No.	Original release date	Original ISBN	North American release date	North American ISBN
1	August 5, 2015	978-4-59-221053-5	April 9, 2024	978-1-64-273324-2
1. "False Bride..."; 2. "Tea Party..."; 3. "Homesick..."; 4. "A Reason to Live"; Digression: "Masks..."
2	April 5, 2016	978-4-59-221054-2	June 25, 2024	978-1-64-273328-0
5. "Jealousy"; 6. "Inheritance"; 7. "The Search for Hojo Ran 1"; 8. "The Search for Hojo Ran 2"; Digression: "Jealousy II"
3	April 5, 2017	978-4-59-221055-9	August 27, 2024	978-1-64-273393-8
9. "Amane"; 10. "Deviant"; 11. "A Shared Secret"; 12. "The Tendo Family"; Digression: "Akira"
4	December 5, 2017	978-4-59-221095-5	October 22, 2024	978-1-64-273394-5
13. "Prelude to the Party"; 14. "Tumult 1"; 15. "Tumult 2"; 16. "Farewell Gift"; Prologue: "The Curtain Rises"
5	September 5, 2018	978-4-59-221136-5	March 25, 2025	978-1-64-273454-6
17. "Another Realm 1"; 18. "Another Realm 2"; 19. "Another Realm 3"; 20. "Another Realm 4"; 21. "Another Realm 5"
6	June 5, 2019	978-4-59-221137-2	May 20, 2025	978-1-64-273455-3
22. "Reunited"; 23. "A Choice"; 24. "Crossroads"; 25. "What Men and Women Do"; 26. "The Past"; 27. "Proof"
7	April 3, 2020	978-4-59-221138-9	March 17, 2026	978-1-64-273504-8
28. "Thereafter"; 29. "Moving"; 30. "A Treat"; 31. "The Meeting"; Prologue: "Impetus"; Bonus: "The Monkey Returns the Favor"; Digression: "Murakami and Ran"
8	October 5, 2020	978-4-59-221139-6	—	—
9	April 5, 2021	978-4-59-221140-2	—	—
10	October 5, 2021	978-4-59-221246-1; 978-4-59-210625-8 (SE)	—	—
11	May 2, 2022	978-4-59-221247-8	—	—
12	November 4, 2022	978-4-59-221248-5	—	—
13	June 5, 2023	978-4-59-221249-2; 978-4-59-221250-8 (SE)	—	—
14	February 5, 2024	978-4-59-222144-9	—	—
15	September 5, 2024	978-4-59-222145-6	—	—
16	July 4, 2025	978-4-592-22276-7	—	—
17	March 5, 2026	978-4-592-22277-4; 978-4-592-22280-4 (SE)	—	—

=== Other media ===
A drama CD consisting of male characters from other series published in the LaLa magazine was released in the October 2018 issue of the magazine on August 24, 2018. It featured the voice of Kaito Ishikawa as Masato Tendo.

A voice drama adaptation was released in the November 2021 issue of LaLa magazine on September 24, 2021. It featured Ishikawa reprising his role as Masato Tendo, with Rie Takahashi and Shin-ichiro Miki cast as Ran and Tachibana, respectively.

== Reception ==
By October 2022, the series had over 2 million copies in circulation in both physical and electronic releases.

== See also ==
- Kawaii Hito, another manga series by the same author
