= Kawaii Hito =

Japanese manga series

- First tankōbon volume cover

かわいいひと
- Genre: Romantic comedy
- Manga
- Written by: Ken Saito
- Published by: Hakusensha
- Imprint: Hana to Yume Comics LaLa
- Magazine: Ane LaLa; LaLa DX
- Original run: September 5, 2014 – October 10, 2019
- Volumes: 7

Kawaii Hito (かわいいひと; "Adorable Person") is a Japanese manga series written and illustrated by Ken Saito. It began serialization in Hakusensha's Ane LaLa magazine in September 2014. After the magazine ended publication in September 2017, the series was transferred to the LaLa DX magazine where it ran from December 2017 to October 2019.

== Plot ==
Mori Hanazono, a florist with a scary appearance, is suddenly confessed to by Hiyori, an attractive college student, and starts dating her.

== Publication ==
Written and illustrated by Ken Saito, Kawaii Hito initially began serialization in Hakusensha's Ane LaLa magazine on September 5, 2014. After the magazine ended publication on September 5, 2017, the series was transferred to the LaLa DX magazine where it ran from December 9, 2017, to October 10, 2019. Its chapters were collected into seven tankōbon volumes released from May 1, 2015, to January 4, 2020.

No.	Release date	ISBN
1	May 1, 2015	978-4-592-19586-3
2	January 5, 2016	978-4-592-19587-0
3	November 4, 2016	978-4-592-19588-7
4	April 5, 2017	978-4-592-19589-4
5	December 5, 2017	978-4-592-19590-0
6	January 4, 2019	978-4-592-21146-4
7	January 4, 2020	978-4-592-21147-1

== Reception ==
The series won the grand prize at the 1st Electronic Comic Award in 2018 hosted by NTT Solmare.

== See also ==
- Tales of the Tendo Family, another manga series by the same author
