= Flower in a Storm =

Japanese manga series

- English cover of the first manga volume

花に嵐 (Hana ni Arashi)
- Genre: Adventure, romance
- Manga
- Written by: Shigeyoshi Takagi
- Published by: Hakusensha
- English publisher: Viz Media
- Magazine: LaLa; LaLa DX
- Original run: 2006 – 2008
- Volumes: 2

Flower in a Storm (花に嵐, Hana ni Arashi) is a romance manga series by Shigeyoshi Takagi. The series follows Riko, an extraordinarily strong teen girl that is forced into a relationship when the spoiled and wealthy Ran asks her to marry him.

The manga was first published by Hakusensha in the shōjo manga magazines LaLa and LaLa DX between 2006 and 2008 and collected in 2 bound volumes. Viz Media announced at Anime Expo 2009 that they had licensed the series with the intent of publishing it in 2010.

== Plot ==
The main series follows high school students Riko Kunumi, a young girl with superpowers, and Ran Tachibana, a rich heir. Riko is initially irritated when Ran storms into her classroom stating that he has fallen in love with her and that she should be his bride. She spends much of her time running away from Ran as he pursues her using his vast wealth. The situation is made worse when Ran's fiancé appears to claim him and assassins are sent after them.

=== Bonus stories ===
The official releases through Viz and Hakusensha included two bonus stories. The first, Jigoku Kokyuu no Hitsuyou, centers on a boy that finds him awoken from his nap by a girl's kiss, while the second story, Fureru Ondo deals with a male student that hates being touched by anyone other than the female biology teacher.

== Main characters ==
- Riko Kunimi: In the series Riko initially appears to be an average teenage girl, but secretly possesses super powers such as super strength and speed. She's initially annoyed with Ran, but gradually begins to develop feelings for him over the course of the series.
- Ran Tachibana: Ran is a wealthy teenage boy that becomes interested with Riko due to her personality and superpowers. He is initially selfish, but as the story develops he becomes more aware of Riko's feelings.
- Akage the assassin: Akage is a strange and flashy assassin that initially approaches Ran and Riko, but is eventually shown to be not much of a bad guy.
- Chiaki: Ran's friend from prep school, Chiaki spends much of his time battling with Ran due to feelings of inferiority for not being more perfect.
- Kokonoe Rinko: Rinko was chosen to be Ran's wife by his parents and is initially portrayed as a superficial stereotype of a rich heiress, but is later shown to have real feelings for Ran.

== Reception ==
Critical reception for Flower in a Storm was largely mixed, with the School Library Journal writing that the first volume was something that readers "can comfortably pass on and wait for something stronger to come along". Anime News Network gave the first volume a C rating praising the artwork while stating that "situations often feel overplayed and underwhelming". In contrast, Booklist's review of volume one was largely positive, with the reviewer stating that "[w]hen the next volume is released, readers will hope for more of Takagi's shorter works, too." A staff member for Mania.com wrote that the series "doesn't have much sustenance" but that she was ultimately "charmed by both protagonists".
