= Captive Hearts (manga) =

Japanese manga series by Matsuri Hino

- Cover of first manga volume

とらわれの身の上 (Toraware no Mi-no-Ue)
- Genre: Romance
- Manga
- Written by: Matsuri Hino
- Published by: Hakusensha
- English publisher: AUS: Madman Entertainment; NA: Viz Media
- Magazine: LaLa
- Original run: 1999 – 2002
- Volumes: 5

Captive Hearts (Japanese: とらわれの身の上, Hepburn: Toraware no Mi-no-Ue) is a Japanese shōjo manga series written and illustrated by Matsuri Hino. The series centers on the relationship between university student Megumi Kuroishi and heiress Suzuka Kogami and the curse that has bonded their respective families together for the past 100 generations. The series was originally serialized in Japan between 1999–2002 and published in the form of 5 tankōbon volumes. It was published in North America starting in 2008. In 2009, the series was listed among the top 10 shōjo properties.

== Plot ==
The Kuroishi and Kogami families have a strange bond: for one hundred generations, the Kuroishi clan is compelled to serve the Kogami clan with their mind, body and soul. Fourteen years ago, the entire Kogami family mysteriously disappeared. The head butler, Yoshimi Kuroishi, and his son Megumi reside in the Kogami house, living a life of wealth, riches, and luxury. Megumi in particular is happily enjoying his easy life, until one member of the Kogami family, Suzuka, is discovered alive and well in China. Megumi is determined to refuse to serve his new mistress Suzuka when she returns, but he quickly learns that the compulsion to serve is not one he can ignore; it is a curse. When they first meet, he finds himself kneeling before her and kissing her hand to welcome her home and carrying her into the house. Though he tries to fight it, he soon realizes that he is not able to.

As the series progresses, deep friendship blossoms into a romance between Suzuka and Megumi as they learn more about the curse. Together, they try to find a way to break it so they can live their lives together.

== Characters ==
- Megumi Kuroishi (黒石 恵, Kuroishi Megumi) is a 20-year-old Japanese university student who loved to live a carefree life inside the Kogami Mansion until one day, one of the missing Kogami family members, Suzuka, returns from China and enters his life. He is under a curse of the Kogami's Dragon cast 100 generations ago. Every time Megumi looks into Suzuka's eyes he is taken over by the curse of the dragon, and becomes a doting, adoring, overprotective, servant to his "princess". Initially Megumi is greedy and wants the family dead so he can continue to live an easy life. He is horrified that he must be a servant and tries at first to leave but is unable to. In time he begins to genuinely care for Suzuka and is able to act more like himself even when influenced by the curse, which can be resisted to some extent if he avoids eye contact.
- Suzuka Kogami (昂上 鈴花, Kogami Suzuka), the sole heir to the Kogami fortune is seventeen years old. She was three years old when her parents took her to China and never came back. The people who set out to find them claimed the family was dead, but then fourteen years later someone found Suzuka living in a Chinese restaurant. She returns to Japan to meet Megumi, again. As she was being tutored by Megumi on learning how to speak Japanese, he writes in Japanese/Chinese kanji to tell her the reason for his mood swings.
- Yōshimi Kurōishi (黒石 嘉, Kuroishi Yoshimi) is the head butler to the Kogamis' and confidante and friend to Suzuka's late parents'. Yoshimi can be tough and strict, but he truly cares about his family and desires to meet their needs.
- Etō Jishii Kurōishi (クロイシ ジシイ エト, Kuroishi Jishii Eto) is Megumi's mother who works for the police, primarily on cases involving stolen children who are sold on the black market.
- Gōshi "Sōgaku" Sagara (剛志 "ソウガク" 相楽, Sagara "Sougaku" Goushi) is Megumi's best friend and fellow university student. She is a transgender girl.
- Hiryuu Takatsukasa (鷹司 比流, Takatsukasa Hiryuu) is a wealthy 16-year-old boy who comes to the Kogami mansion to propose to Suzuka. She rejects his offer, realizing she has deeper feelings for Megumi than she had originally thought.
- Rui Sakurayama (桜山 留衣) is a maid to the Kogami family. She often follows her mother around to assist. She makes her first appearance in Volume 3. She is in love with Megumi, who rejected her for Suzuka. It is shown in a flashback that Megumi treated her as a substitute for Suzuka, when he heard of the Kogami family's death. She comes back to the Kogami mansion, thinking that Megumi will marry her, and gets into a fight with Suzuka over Megumi.

== Media ==
=== Manga ===
It was originally serialized in LaLa from 1999 until 2002. The individual chapters were collected and published in five tankōbon volumes by Hakusensha. The series is licensed for English language release in North American by Viz Media and in Australia and New Zealand by Madman Entertainment.

Volumes

Volume	Japanese release date	Japanese ISBN	English release date (Viz Media)	English ISBN
1	November 5, 1999	ISBN 4-592-17743-6	November 4, 2008	ISBN 978-1-4215-1932-6
2	August 5, 2000	ISBN 4-592-17768-1	January 6, 2009	ISBN 978-1-4215-1933-3
3	February 5, 2001	ISBN 4-592-17505-0	March 3, 2009	ISBN 978-1-4215-2157-2
4	October 5, 2001	ISBN 4-592-17506-9	May 5, 2009	ISBN 978-1-4215-2158-9
5	April 5, 2002	ISBN 4-592-17297-3	July 7, 2009	ISBN 978-1-4215-2159-6

=== Drama CD ===
1. Released on November 21, 2001

However, news suggests that a New Drama CD With improved audio will be released in 2018.

== Reception ==
Leroy Douresseaux of the Comic Book Bin said of the first volume, "It's the comedy that carries this somewhat ordinary teenage shoujo romance." On the later volumes, he claims that he originally didn't have much hope for the series because of its premise, but that Hino deals with it well by focusing not so much on the curse, but on the characters. He also says that, "the mixture of intriguing supporting characters and the narrative forays into the past (which often feature the adorable child versions of Megumi and Suzuka) give Captive Hearts its own distinctive tang".

The series was listed as being the 7th best-selling shōjo series, as well as the 20th over-all manga series, in America for the first quarter 2009.
