= MeruPuri =

Japanese manga series

- Cover of first manga volume

めるぷり メルヘン☆プリンス (MeruPuri: Meruhen Purinsu)
- Genre: Comedy
- Manga
- Written by: Matsuri Hino
- Published by: Hakusensha
- English publisher: NA: Viz Media
- Magazine: LaLa
- Original run: August 2002 – September 2004
- Volumes: 4

MeruPuri, originally titled MeruPuri: Märchen Prince (Japanese: めるぷり メルヘン☆プリンス, Hepburn: MeruPuri: Meruhen Purinsu; "Fairy-Tale Prince"), is a Japanese manga series by written and illustrated by Matsuri Hino. MeruPuri was serialized in Japan in LaLa magazine, and was published in English by Viz Media.

== Plot ==
High school freshman Airi Hoshina is characterized by her desire for future family life and her interest in everyday domestic happiness. She follows a school legend that claims students with longer records of punctual attendance have better chances of finding a romantic partner, motivating her to maintain a non tardy streak .

However, her perfectly mapped out life ambition is derailed when she drops a small mirror that has been passed down in her family for generations on her way to school. Upon returning to retrieve the trinket she discovers it in the possession a cheeky, strangely dressed 7 year-old. She at first fails to retrieve the mirror by rushing off when the first bell rings so she doesn't break her no tardy rule. When she returns and finds the boy still waiting in the same spot with the mirror, he introduces himself as Aram and says he came through the mirror and is waiting for his companion to contact him. Realizing he is alone and thinking he is a foreigner from the embassy, Airi invites him to wait for his companion at her house so he isn't by himself in the city. She welcomes the company since her parents have been traveling abroad for several years and her grandparents often vacation leaving her living in her house alone the majority of the time.

The two develop a friendship quickly as Aram likes that she treats him like any other person, and he stays the night in Airi's room since his companion has yet to contact him. Airi wakes up the next morning to the surprise of her life when she finds Aram has turned into a 17-year-old overnight. Aram's companion Lei finally appears through Airi's mirror and explains that Aram is actually the youngest prince of a magic kingdom called Astale. He reveals that she is actually a descendant of Princess Chrisnele, who is considered a traitor for abandoning her kingdom for love in Airi's world. The mirror was a portal that belonged to her. Aram fled through a separate portal to her world because his older brother Jeile attempted to place a curse on him that would age him into an old man and seal off his magic when he is engulfed in darkness. Aram was slow to escape the spell, and a partial amount of it still took effect aging him into a teenager and making his magic exceptionally difficult to control. Lei declares that the only thing that can restore Aram to his true form is the kiss of one's most beloved maiden. As Aram is too young to have such a woman he declares that Airi, the closest thing he has had to a female friend, is his most beloved maiden. Airi is against the idea as she wants to save her first kiss for her soul mate leaving her and Aram stuck together until he turns back into his true form and can use magic again.

== Characters ==
Airi Hoshina (星名 アイリ, Hoshina Airi)
Voiced by: Fumiko Orikasa (drama CD)
This 15-year-old, happy-go-lucky heroine of the story, Airi, dreams of a warm and peaceful married life like what she sees on her favorite TV drama, Tales of Marriage on the Plains. Her parents work abroad, and she lives with her grandparents she never sees, she would be alone if not for her two dogs, Pochirou and Koromi. Airi has a hand mirror in the shape of a seven-pointed star that has been passed down through her family since the days of her great-great-great grandmother, which can be used as a portal to the magical kingdom of Astale. In fact, Airi's great-great-great grandmother was a traitorous princess from Astale, Chrisnelle, making her a direct descendant of the royal family.
Airi's first impression of Aram is that he is a cute little boy, but he quickly comes to stand in the way of her plans of living a normal life. Her dreams of a normal marriage disappear when she unwittingly performs marriage vows with him. Because of the vows, she and Aram both now have matching insignias on their chests. If any man aside from Aram kisses the symbol, then her heart will stop beating. However, she slowly becomes fond of Aram and finally realizes her feelings during their high school summer trip to the beach, where Raz tries to kill her by kissing the symbol on her chest. After that, she was completely devoted to Aram.
Although, encounters with Aram's former fiance Mariabel causes problems when she removes Aram's memories and feelings for Airi by the help of Raz. Airi can't let Aram go as she constantly tries to get him to remember her.
Ten years after, on Aram's 17th birthday, at the ceremony of coming of age, they officially get married when she is at the age of 25. (ch 22)
Aram (アラム, Aramu)
Voiced by: Yuki Kaida (child), Hikaru Midorikawa (adult) (drama CD)
A 7-year old prince of the magical kingdom of Astale, his full name is Astale Ae Daemonia Eucharista Aram. Aram came to Airi's world to avoid a spell his half-brother Jeile was trying to cast on him. Because Aram was slow to escape the spell and that he got hit by half of it, its effect wasn't as Jeile intended. It was supposed to age Aram to an old man overnight in the dark, but it ends up growing him into a 17-year-old whenever he is in darkness. The only way to return him to his proper form is with a kiss from his most beloved maiden, whom he quickly determines to be Airi. He is always quick to proclaim his everlasting love for her, much to Airi's chagrin at first.
When Aram had his memories removed by the box Raz gave Mariabel, he becomes aloof and indifferent towards Airi, However, he feels slightly disturbed around her and doesn't know why. But then he kisses Airi once more and returns to his original form, confirming Airi's love for him and she is his most beloved.
Occasionally, Aram enjoys teasing Airi, for instance when Airi touched Aram's body while he was sleeping when he was actually awake, telling her she could do anything to him if she wanted to.
In some ways Aram is a typical little boy, and he develops a fondness for things like super sentai shows (especially The Sparkle Rangers) and rice omelettes, but he also has an exceedingly regal bearing and often seems twice his real age. Although formally engaged to Mariabel, Aram makes Airi perform Astale's traditional marriage vows with him in order to save her from going to the Eternal Prison. At first, their marriage is not recognized by anyone in Astale until volume 4 where Aram officially places their marriage into the "Book of Oaths". However, their official wedding is not until Aram comes of age 10 years later (when he is 17), in chapter 22. At this time Jeile performs a reversal spell on him, causing him to turn into a little kid when it goes dark.
Jeile (ジェイル, Jieiru)
Voiced by: Daisuke Kishio (drama CD)
Aram's older half-brother and the crown prince of Astale; his full name is Astale Ae Daemonia Eucharista Jeile. He is eccentric and a playboy. He cast the aging spell on Aram out of frustration because Aram receives all of their father's attention. In actuality, Jeile really does care about Aram, and it's likely he simply never considered the consequences of the spell. Though he seems like a bungler at first, Jeile is the commander of Astale's magical army.
When Aram loses his memory, he helps Airi and even assists her on being by her side while she is in their realm.
Jeile has a bit of a masochistic streak; he becomes smitten with Airi after she slaps him, and tries to get her to become his first wife. He calls Airi his Mountain Lily Maiden and tries to be happy for her after she becomes Aram's fiance. When Aram turns 17 he reverses the spell so Aram turns into a child in the dark after hearing Airi complain about never being able to see him little again.
When he was about twelve years old, his first love was Lei (he did not know that Lei was a boy at the time due to Lei's long hair and rather feminine appearance). His fiancé is Lei's sister, Nei. When Jeile meets her, he can't bear to see her face because it is identical to Lei's. However, five years later when Jeile is King of Astale (after the former king and queen retired) he accepts Nei and they even have two children, whose names are not revealed.
Lei (レイ, Rei)
Voiced by: Nozomu Sasaki (drama CD)
Aram's caretaker, he is a conscientious civil servant and attentive to Aram. However, he has no respect for Airi, and is troubled about Aram's fondness for her. He's about nineteen years old. He is also in love with Queen Veedua, as revealed in volume 4. His sister Nei is identical to him. He had to impersonate Airi while she was learning magic in Astale. Everyone in school was fooled except for Nakaoji, whose ancestor was a great magician of Astale. Lei has another form, which resembles a phoenix.
Nakaoji (仲央路くん, Nakaōji-kun)
Voiced by: Atsushi Kisaichi (drama CD)
The president of Airi's class and, though he might not know it, Airi's current prime marriage candidate. He seems rather taken with Airi himself. Nakaoji is sporty, friendly, and good with kids, though he and Aram sparred. This is because Nakaoji had lost patience with Aram who disliked him right from the start, as he knew that Airi liked Nakaoji and was determined to get catch Airi's heart. His ancestor was the Grand Magician of Astale who first established the seven royal families of Astelle.
Razalude (ラザルード, Razarūdo)
A member of one of Astale's royal houses, the Zehrotuhia house, his full name is Zerothuhia Razalude, but he usually goes by Raz. His family would've been the rulers of Astale if not for the betrayal of Airi's ancestor, the princess Chrisnele. For this reason, Raz seems determined to inflict his family's misfortune on Airi but in volume 4, it is revealed that actually, he likes her and that the reason that he tried to kill her was because he had a deal with her majesty Queen Veedua that if he helped her in this task she must let him travel wherever he likes. In volume 4, he is summoned by Nakaoji's little sister, who hopes to get him to kill her brother for telling their Mom not to get her a cell phone. He is said to be about sixteen years old.
Mariabel (マリアベル, Mariaberu)
Aram's fiancé. Mariabel is certain that she is the best match for Aram, and steals Aram's memories of Airi to win him back to her. She is dismayed that Aram continues to pursue Airi and that only Airi's kiss is able to turn him back to normal. She realizes her foolishness and becomes friends with Airi.
Maruru (マルル)
Voiced by: Ema Kogure (drama CD)
Jeile's fairy. She got into his bedroom searching a flower to live with, as fairies spend their lives sharing energy with flowers. She had chosen a ribbon instead, by accident since it had a rose pattern on it, and Jeile, to save her, created a magic ribbon over her head which matched the one around his hair. In this way, she could share his life force and in this way grow. Jeile is scolded for this, as it supposedly makes him appear "soft" and unworthy to command the Astale magical army, but he nonetheless does not regret his decision. In volume 4, Maruru fully matures and becomes larger, so that she is the size of a normal woman.
Queen Veedua
Aram's mother and a very intimidating woman. She and the king have a 100-year age gap. Veedua is very playful to the point of appearing cruel (Jeile, Lei and Aram's opinion of her). To test their love she makes them go through a trial where Airi is required to find the lost ring of Chrisnelle which is given to all children of royalty when they are born. She was the one to make the plan to steal Aram's memories of Airi. However, upon meeting Airi, Veedua becomes quite fond of her, due to hearing of how Airi made Aram clean her bathroom and never hesitates to tell Aram to shut up.
Hirata Ayashi
Voiced by: Jun Fukuyama (drama CD)
Airi's friend from junior high-school who used to have a crush on her. Airi rejected Hirata's confession on their graduation day and so made fun of Airi's imagination. He met Airi again in the theme park in chapter 1 of the manga and once again ridiculed her in front of his girlfriend (voiced by Asami Imai in the drama CD) and said that no one would want to be Airi's boyfriend until he saw Aram.
Umi Nakaoji
Naokaoji's little sister, who summons Raz in order to get rid of her big brother once and for all so that she talk to the boy she likes and start using her cellphone again. She calls Raz "Demon", probably because of the way they met (via summoning). It isn't actually known what happens to her after that, however there is a woman that looks a lot like her on the last page Raz appears in. If it is her, more than likely Umi decided to further her interest in magic.

== Reception ==
On Anime News Network, Zac Bertschy gave volume 1 a grade of C+ for the story and B+ for the art.
