= Prince Freya =

Japanese manga series

- Cover of the first volume

偽りのフレイヤ (Itsuwari no Fureiya)
- Genre: Action; Fantasy; Reverse harem
- Manga
- Written by: Keiko Ishihara
- Published by: Hakusensha
- English publisher: NA: Viz Media
- Magazine: LaLa DX
- Original run: August 10, 2017 – present
- Volumes: 15

Prince Freya (Japanese: 偽りのフレイヤ, Hepburn: Itsuwari no Fureiya) is a Japanese manga series written and illustrated by Keiko Ishihara. It began serialization in Hakusensha's LaLa DX magazine in August 2017. As of June 2026, fifteen volumes have been released.

== Characters ==
Freya (フレイヤ, Fureiya)
Voiced by: Aoi Yūki (PV)
Julius (ユリウス, Yuriusu)
Voiced by: Junichi Suwabe (PV)
Aleksi (アレクシス, Arekushisu)
Voiced by: Chiaki Kobayashi (PV)

== Media ==
=== Manga ===
Written and illustrated by Keiko Ishihara, the series began serialization in Hakusensha's LaLa DX magazine on August 10, 2017. As of June 2026, the series' individual chapters have been collected into fifteen tankōbon volumes.

At Anime Expo 2019, Viz Media announced that they licensed the series for English publication.

==== Volumes ====
No.	Original release date	Original ISBN	English release date	English ISBN
1	April 5, 2018	978-4-592-21191-4	April 7, 2020	978-1-9747-0876-5
2	October 5, 2018	978-4-592-21192-1	July 7, 2020	978-1-9747-0877-2
3	August 5, 2019	978-4-592-21193-8	October 6, 2020	978-1-9747-1483-4
4	March 5, 2020	978-4-592-21194-5	January 5, 2021	978-1-9747-2016-3
5	November 5, 2020	978-4-592-21195-2	September 7, 2021	978-1-9747-2336-2
6	April 30, 2021	978-4-592-22096-1	May 3, 2022	978-1-9747-2842-8
7	October 5, 2021	978-4-592-22097-8	September 6, 2022	978-1-9747-3411-5
8	February 4, 2022	978-4-592-22098-5	January 3, 2023	978-1-9747-3619-5
9	August 5, 2022	978-4-592-22099-2	August 1, 2023	978-1-9747-3890-8
10	April 5, 2023	978-4-592-22100-5	February 6, 2024	978-1-9747-4383-4
11	February 5, 2024	978-4-592-22166-1	February 4, 2025	978-1-9747-5192-1
12	October 4, 2024	978-4-592-22167-8	November 4, 2025	978-1-9747-5897-5
13	June 5, 2025	978-4-592-22168-5	May 5, 2026	978-1-9747-6568-3
14	December 5, 2025	978-4-592-22169-2	November 3, 2026	978-1-9747-6906-3
15	June 5, 2026	978-4-592-23134-9	—	—

=== Other ===
In commemoration of the release of the series' twelfth volume, a series of promotional videos were released between October 5 and 7, 2024 on Hakusensha's Hakusen Anime YouTube channel.

== Reception ==
Ian Wolf of Anime UK News praised the artwork and action in the story. He also favorably compared the story to Yona of the Dawn. Morgana Santilli of Comics Beat also praised the use of violence and action in the story. Additionally, Santilli favorably compared the protagonist Freya to Sailor Moon and felt the artwork was similar to shōjo manga from the 1990s and 2000s. Hannah Collins of Comic Book Resources felt the plot was typical of shōjo manga, she felt it still had a "satisfying effect".

The series was nominated for the print category of the Next Manga Award in 2020.

By October 2024, the series had over 1 million copies in circulation.
