= Eyelis =

Japanese band

eyelis
- Genre: Anison
- Years active: 2012–present
- Labels: Smile Company; Geneon Universal Entertainment (2012–end); Warner Bros. Home Entertainment (2015–present)
- Members: Satomi Kawasaki (vocals, keyboard); Takeshi Masuda (guitar, vocals); Wataru Maeguchi (strings, guitar)
- Website: ameblo.jp/eyelis530/ whv-amusic.com/eyelis/

Eyelis (アイリス, Airisu) (stylized as eyelis) is a Japanese music group signed to Geneon Universal Entertainment then moved to Warner Bros. Home Entertainment Japan in 2015. The group consists of Satomi Kawasaki on keyboard, Takeshi Masuda on guitar and Wataru Maeguchi on strings.

== History ==
Eyelis' first single, "Can't Take My Eyes Off You", was released on November 14, 2012, and is used as the opening theme for the eponymous third season of Hayate the Combat Butler. Their second single, "Hikari no Kiseki / Mirai e no Tobira" (ヒカリノキセキ / 未来への扉), was released on December 19, 2012, and contains two songs that were used in two OVAs of The World God Only Knows. In 2015, they started new activities under new label Warner Bros. Home Entertainment and released their new single "Kizuna ni Nosete" (絆にのせて) which is used as ending theme for the anime television series Akagami no Shirayukihime.

== Members ==
- Satomi Kawasaki (川崎里実, Kawasaki Satomi)
- Takeshi Masuda (増田武史, Masuda Takeshi)
- Wataru Maeguchi (前口 渉, Maeguchi Wataru)

== Discography ==
=== Albums ===
Year	Album details	Peak Oricon chart positions
2012	Pre-Production: Released: May 30, 2012; Label: Geneon (GNCA-1325); Format: CD	157
"—" denotes releases that did not chart.

=== Singles ===
Year	Song	Peak Oricon chart positions	Album
2012	"Can't Take My Eyes Off You"	39	
2012	"Hikari no Kiseki / Mirai e no Tobira"	45	
2013	"OUTLAWS"	78	
2015	"Kizuna ni Nosete"	51	
2016	"Page: Kimi to Tsuzuru Monogatari"	38	
