= My Darling! Miss Bancho =

Japanese manga series

- Cover of the first volume

あぁ愛しの番長さま (Aa Itoshi no Banchō-sama)
- Genre: Reverse harem; Romantic comedy
- Manga
- Written by: Mayu Fujikata
- Published by: Hakusensha
- English publisher: NA: CMX
- Magazine: LaLa (2006–2009); LaLa DX (2017–present)
- Original run: April 1, 2006 – present
- Volumes: 8

My Darling! Miss Bancho (Japanese: あぁ愛しの番長さま, Hepburn: Aa Itoshi no Banchō-sama; "Aah, My Beloved School Gang Leader") is a Japanese manga series written and illustrated by Mayu Fujikata. It was serialized in Hakusensha's LaLa magazine from April 2006 to 2009, when it went on hiatus. In June 2017, the series resumed serialization in LaLa DX. As of December 2018, eight volumes have been published.

== Publication ==
Written and illustrated by Mayu Fujikata, the series began serialization in Hakusensha's LaLa magazine on April 1, 2006. The series went on hiatus in 2009. On February 10, 2017, Fujikata published a one-shot of the series in LaLa DX, followed by serialization of the series resuming in LaLa DX on June 9, 2017. As of December 2018, the series' individual chapters have been collected into eight tankōbon volumes.

At Anime Expo 2009, CMX announced that they licensed the series for English publication. CMX published one volume before shutting down.

=== Volume list ===
No.	Original release date	Original ISBN	English release date	English ISBN
1	November 4, 2006	978-4-59-218854-4	March 10, 2010	978-1-40-122055-6
2	May 2, 2007	978-4-59-218869-8	—	—
3	January 4, 2008	978-4-59-218877-3	—	—
4	August 5, 2008	978-4-59-218878-0	—	—
5	May 1, 2009	978-4-59-218879-7	—	—
6	June 5, 2017	978-4-59-221117-4	—	—
7	April 5, 2018	978-4-59-221118-1	—	—
8	December 5, 2018	978-4-59-221119-8	—	—

== Reception ==
Rebecca Silverman of Anime News Network liked the humor and use of stereotypes. Regarding the artwork, Silverman stated that it is "pretty basic, but [Fujikata] gets a lot out of it". Sean Gaffney of A Case Suitable for Treatment stated "it's best to treat [the series] as goofily as possible". Gaffney also praised the artwork and CMX localization of the dialogue. A columnist for Manga Village described the series as hilarious and different from typical shōjo manga, though they criticized the artwork, noting it was Fujikata's first work. A columnist for Pop Culture Shock compared the series to My Heavenly Hockey Club, Otomen, and Maid Sama!, noting similarities in their settings and humor. She stated that outside of its humor, "there's not much to speak of [in the story] in terms of plot and characters" and felt the artwork was rough initially. A columnist for Comics Worth Reading described the story as "something entertaining that only occupies your attention while you're reading it" and felt that the artwork was typical of shōjo manga. Snow Wildsmith of School Library Journal liked the story, especially its humor. Regarding the artwork, she felt it had some weaknesses apparent in the earlier chapters.
