= Sweet Rein =

Japanese manga by Sakura Tsukuba

よろしく・マスター (Yoroshiku Masutā)
- Genre: Comedy, fantasy, romance
- Manga
- Written by: Sakura Tsukuba
- Published by: Hakusensha
- English publisher: Viz Media
- Magazine: LaLa DX
- Original run: 2005 (tankōbon) – 2009 (tankōbon)
- Volumes: 3

Sweet Rein (よろしく・マスター, Yoroshiku Masutā) is a shōjo manga by Sakura Tsukuba. A romantic comedy that is centered around the concept of Santa and Reindeers.

== Plot ==
Kurumi Sagara is a high school student who one day bumps into Kaito, a young man who turn out to be a Reindeer. She learns that she has become a Santa, being able to command Kaito who regards her as his 'Master'. Now with her new duty as Santa, she is tasked with Kaito to deliver presents to children on Christmas.

As a Reindeer is often attached to their Santa at first sight, Kaito also quickly develops feelings towards Kurumi, which Kurumi is not accustomed to. Kaito is determined to prove that his feelings are real and not just as a result of their unique relationship.

== Setting ==
Santas are ordinary humans who are given the task to deliver presents to children the night before Christmas. They become Santas after physically coming in contact with their destined Reindeers. Once they become acquainted with their Reindeers, a rein connecting the Santa to the Reindeer appears, which only Santas and Reindeers can see. The rein is elastic and is invisible to normal people. It cannot be cut by physical objects. Whoever holds the reins of the reindeer controls them. One end of the reins are tied around the Santa's left hand, and the other end is implied to be connected to the reindeer's heart. Santas are also stated to be rarely female.

Reindeers are people whose purpose are to help Santas deliver presents to children on Christmas. They tend to bond quickly to their Santas, usually exhibiting a master-servant relationship. Their bodies respond to any command their Santa gives, being able to fly and be summoned at any time to their master, regardless of their will. They are even able to come back after death to complete the master's order. The Reindeer's body may also react upon any indirect commands from their Santa. They are also able to transform into actual reindeers, which is the form they undertake when they are with their Santas delivering presents. The only time when the Reindeer can be exempt from their master's commands is when they kiss on the mouth, at this time, the reins will disappear. The reins will reappear when the Santa and Reindeer touch each other. Reindeers also share the physiological traits of actual reindeers, as shown that they are weak to the heat. They also experience heat during spring, in which Reindeers will begin attracting other humans of the opposite sex who lay their eyes on them. During this time, the reins of the Reindeer will turn red. Reindeers often appear as normal humans, a common feature are their vertical slit pupils. They also have the ability to fly in any form.

Black Santas are people who are sent to judge a Santa and Reindeer pair. They can do this by severing the rein of the pair and separating the reindeer and the Santa for a day. During this time, the Black Santa is in control of the Reindeer and can restrain them from their master. If the rein doesn't re-attach in the following day, then the Santa has to resign from their duty. There are also alternate ways for a Santa and Reindeer pair to be tested.

Black Reindeers are former Reindeers who have upset their Santas by their own free will, and are punished by being unable to die. Their Santas also have to resign. They are seen to be paired with a Black Santa.

Stray Reindeers are Black Reindeers who refuse to deliver presents or evaluate Santas. Because of this, they're punished by being forced to wander without purpose, if they receive a fatal wound, it will be healed quickly. Most Stray Reindeers are a result of their Santa's dying whilst the leash is still attached. Their leashes aren't connected to anything. They are unable to fly by themselves, however if any other Santa grabs onto their leash and commands them to fly, they will be able to. It's observed that a Reindeer's hair turns black when they become a Black Reindeer.

== Characters ==
=== Kurumi Sagara ===
A 17-year-old girl who assumes the role of Kaito's Santa after bumping into him. She has become accustomed to loneliness as her mother died when she was young and her father is often away from home due to work. Because of this, she is often hesitant and flustered to Kaito's expressions of affection. She is also described as 'responsible' by Kaito's family as she assumes a level headed demeanor in most situations and diligently does her duty as Santa. She later comes to enjoy her role as Santa as she doesn't feel lonely anymore.

=== Kaito ===
Kaito is a young looking man born form a lineage of reindeer. He has an honest personality and is straightforward in conveying his thoughts. He was attached to Kurumi as soon as he became her reindeer and became affectionate to her which is a common trait for reindeers towards their Santas. He is happy to accept Kurumi as his master and is cheerful in carrying out her instructions. He isn't deterred by the fact that his feelings to her can result in him becoming a black reindeer. He admires his reindeer grandfather.

=== Rihito ===
A young man with glasses who is also from the lineage of Reindeers, however unlike most Reindeers, he isn't interested in meeting his Santa nor obeying orders.

=== Black Santa/Akira ===
A Santa that has been tasked with evaluating Santas.

=== Black Reindeer/ Nene ===
Nene became a Black Reindeer after falling in love with her fourth Santa and then disrupting his relationship with another. She is currently paired with Akira and accompanies him with his evaluations.

=== Daisuke Tateyama ===
An eleventh grade student who also works as a construction worker. Because his parents have died, he has taken over most of the responsibilities in providing for himself and his sister. He is also known to take multiple jobs over the summer. He is Rihito's Santa, though he was originally not interested in the role of Santa. Despite his conflicts with Rihito, they are shown to be a good team and are seen to pass the Santa evaluation.

== Manga ==
Serialized in LaLa DX this manga has been published in three volumes by Hakusensha, in German by Tokyopop, and in English by Viz Media.

No.	Original release date	Original ISBN	English release date	English ISBN
1	November 5, 2005	4592188365	November 5, 2013	978-1-4215-5931-5
2	September 5, 2007	4592183894	April 1, 2014	978-1-4215-5931-5
3	April 3, 2009	4592183908	July 1, 2014	978-1-4215-5933-9
