= Matsuri Hino =

Japanese manga artist

Matsuri Hino 樋野まつり
- Born: January 24 Sapporo, Hokkaidō, Japan
- Area: Manga artist
- Notable works: Vampire Knight
- Collaborators: Ayuna Fujisaki

Matsuri Hino (樋野 まつり, Hino Matsuri) is a Japanese manga artist born in Sapporo, Hokkaidō. She made her professional debut in the September 10, 1995, issue of LaLa DX with the one-shot title Ko no Yume ga Same Tara (この夢が覚めたら, When This Dream is Over). Matsuri is known for her manga series Vampire Knight, which was made into an anime series.

== Works ==
Title	Year	Notes	Refs
Captive Hearts	1999–2002	Serialized in LaLa magazine Published by Hakusensha in 5 volumes	
MeruPuri: Märchen Prince	2002–04	Serialized in LaLa magazine Published by Hakusensha in 4 volumes	
Wanted	2005	3 chapters, Published by Hakusensha in 1 volume	
Vampire Knight	2004–13	Serialized in LaLa magazine Published by Hakusensha, 19 volumes Also related art books and fan books	
Toraware no Mi-no-Ue (とらわれの身の上愛蔵版, Bond circumstance favorite book)		Serialized in Hana to Yume Special, 3 volumes	
Shuriken to purītsu (手裏剣とプリーツ, Shuriken and Pleat)	2016	Serialized in Hana to Yume, 2 volumes	
Vampire Knight: Ice Blue Sin (ヴァンパイア騎士 憂氷の罪, Vanpaia Naito: Aisu Burū no Tsumi) light novel with Ayuna Fujisaki	2008	The first novel in the Vampire Knight trilogy.	
Vampire Knight: Noir's Trap (ヴァンパイア騎士 凝黒の罠, Vanpaia Naito: Nowāru no Wana) light novel with Ayuna Fujisaki	2008	The second novel in the Vampire Knight trilogy.	
Vampire Knight: Fleeting Dreams (ヴァンパイア騎士ト 煌銀の夢, Vanpaia Naito: Flail no Yume) light novel with Ayuna Fujisaki	2014	The third novel in the Vampire Knight trilogy. Licensed by Viz Media and released in North America.	
Vampire Knight memories	2016–25	Serialized in LaLa DX	
