= Snow White with the Red Hair =

Japanese manga and anime series

- Cover of the first manga volume, featuring Shirayuki

赤髪の白雪姫 (Akagami no Shirayukihime)
- Genre: Fantasy, romance
- Manga
- Written by: Sorata Akiduki
- Published by: Hakusensha
- English publisher: NA: Viz Media
- Magazine: LaLa DX; (August 10, 2006 – August 10, 2011); LaLa; (October 24, 2011 – present)
- Original run: August 10, 2006 – present
- Volumes: 27
- Anime television series
- Directed by: Masahiro Andō
- Written by: Deko Akao
- Music by: Michiru Ōshima
- Studio: Bones
- Licensed by: Crunchyroll; AUS: Madman Entertainment; SEA: Muse Communication; UK: Anime Limited (expired)
- Original network: Tokyo MX, TVA, ytv, BS Fuji, Animax
- English network: SEA: Animax Asia; US: Crunchyroll Channel
- Original run: July 6, 2015 – March 28, 2016
- Episodes: 24 + OVA

Snow White with the Red Hair (Japanese: 赤髪の白雪姫, Hepburn: Akagami no Shirayukihime) is a Japanese shōjo fantasy romance manga series written and illustrated by Sorata Akizuki. It was originally serialized in Hakusensha's bi-monthly shōjo manga magazine LaLa DX from August 2006 to August 2011, and was moved to the monthly LaLa in October 2011. Its chapters have been published and collected in 27 tankōbon volumes as of May 2025. An anime adaptation produced by Bones aired from 2015 to 2016 - the first half aired in Japan from July 6, 2015, to September 21, 2015, and the second half between January 11, 2016, and March 28, 2016.

== Plot ==
Shirayuki is an herbalist in the kingdom of Tanbarun with one unique feature: her beautiful red hair, which attracts a lot of attention. Due to her hair color, Shirayuki was raised to always be careful of showing her hair in new surroundings, tying it up with a red ribbon. She grew up to be an independent young woman. The first prince of her kingdom, Prince Raj, learns of her unusual hair color and orders her to become his concubine. She refuses his orders, leaving behind her herbalist business and her long red ponytail.

Just inside the border of the neighboring kingdom of Clarines, she meets and befriends Prince Zen Wistaria and his two aides, Mitsuhide and Kiki. When Zen is poisoned by an apple meant for Shirayuki, gifted by Raj, she successfully obtains the antidote and decides to accompany the trio to Clarines. Shortly thereafter, Shirayuki passes an exam for a position to train in the palace as a royal court herbalist. Shirayuki finds a place in Clarines and works as a court herbalist, befriending the youngest herbalist, Ryu.

Prince Zen realizes his feeling towards Shirayuki and starts working hard to become a ruler that she could be proud of. In spite of external opposition due to their difference in social status and the demands of their professions, Zen and Shirayuki begin to fall in love with each other and eventually begin a romantic relationship. Later, Shirayuki promises Zen that she will wait for him.

== Characters ==
=== Main characters ===
Shirayuki (白雪)
Voiced by: Saori Hayami (Japanese); Brina Palencia (English)
Shirayuki (Snow White) is the main protagonist and was born with rare red hair. She often has to hide it due to how it easily attracts attention. She escapes from the kingdom of Tanbarun after its prince orders her to become his concubine. Independent and persistent, she meets Zen on her second day in the kingdom of Clarines and befriends him after tending to his wounds. Later, she is accepted as a royal pharmacist and trains under Garack and Ryu. Shirayuki has demonstrated her abilities as a pharmacist in various situations, particularly in identifying and controlling disease outbreaks in foreign areas. She has a close relationship with Zen and falls in love with him over the course of the story despite her opposition due to their difference in social status. She moves into the east wing of Wistal Castle and is reassigned as a pharmacist to Lilias for two years later.
Zen Wisteria (ゼン・ウィスタリア, Zen Wisutaria)
Voiced by: Ryōta Ōsaka (Japanese); Jessie James Grelle (English)
Zen is the second prince of Clarines and meets Shirayuki on a trip outside the castle. Shortly after befriending her, he is poisoned by an apple meant for Shirayuki, but obtains the antidote with her help. Initially, Zen is often seen escaping his duties to experience Clarines first-hand, though he has since taken more responsibility for official work. He has a close relationship with his three aides, Mitsuhide, Kiki, and Obi, and has both their respect and genuine loyalty. Over the course of the story, he falls in love with Shirayuki and rescues her from various dangers.
Mitsuhide Louen (ミツヒデ・ルーエン, Mitsuhide Rūen)
Voiced by: Yūichirō Umehara (Japanese); Ian Sinclair (English)
Mitsuhide is one of Zen's closest aides. He was appointed by Prince Izana to watch over Zen (despite initially wanting to be Izana's retainer) and is a skilled swordsman. Though their relationship was initially rocky, he is seen by Zen as both a close friend and a reliable aide. He is extremely loyal though somewhat clumsy at times, as well as a little silly. In chapter 92, he is offered a marriage proposal by Kiki, which he declines. Because of his extreme loyalty to Zen, he does not plan to marry, as this may require him to leave Zen's side.
Kiki Seiran (木々・セイラン)
Voiced by: Kaori Nazuka (Japanese); Jamie Marchi (English)
Kiki is one of Zen's closest aides and arrives at the castle sometime after Mitsuhide. As the heir to the household of the Seiran family, her father expects her to return home to assume responsibility after her time serving Zen. Reserved, independent and intelligent, Kiki is extremely loyal to protecting Zen (and later Shirayuki as she becomes part of Zen's life) and is most often seen with Mitsuhide, Zen's other close aide. Like Mitsuhide, she is skilled at swordplay and is often seen training soldiers or dueling with him. In chapter 92, Kiki confesses and proposes to Mitsuhide, which he declines. She is later engaged to Hisame, who has loved her for years, and she seems to be slowly reciprocating.
Obi (オビ)
Voiced by: Nobuhiko Okamoto (Japanese); Austin Tindle (English)
Obi is one of Zen's self-proclaimed aides. Originally sent by Marquis Haruka as a way to scare Shirayuki out of the castle, he later pledges himself to Zen after being discovered. It is hinted he has feelings for Shirayuki, but his loyalty to both Zen and Shirayuki prevents him from acting out on his feelings. Obi has a relatively mysterious past as a loner but finds himself drawn to protecting Zen, Shirayuki, and their respective goals. He later becomes Zen's official messenger. With his quick movements and reflexes, he is often sent by Zen to protect Shirayuki at times when he cannot leave his royal duties. He has been seen using the alias "Nanaki".

=== Secondary characters ===
==== Clarines ====
Ryu (リユウ, Ryū)
Voiced by: Yūko Sanpei (Japanese); Mikaela Krantz (English)
A 12-year-old royal pharmacist who trains under Garack with Shirayuki at Wistal Castle. He and Shirayuki and he established a close friendship as mentor and pupil respectively. Due to his youth, he is often looked down upon and mistrusted by others in the palace, even though he is actually a genius. Because of his intelligence, he has a hard time connecting with people his age but becomes good friends with Shirayuki and Obi. He later learns how to open up and trust others as he grows.
Izana Wisteria (イザナ・ウィスタリア, Izana Wisutaria)
Voiced by: Akira Ishida (Japanese); Eric Vale (English)
Izana is the first prince of Clarines and Zen's older brother. He has a somewhat cold and sarcastic personality, but is also very responsible and serious when it comes to handling the affairs of the kingdom. He enjoys teasing Zen and initially takes issue with Shirayuki's closeness with Zen, but later comes to trust her after watching her handle a disease outbreak in Lilias. While in Lilias, Izana pretends to be a guard using Mitsuhide's name. Known to be very intelligent, strategic, and cunning, he is later crowned king of Clarines.
Marquis Haruka (ハルカ候)
Voiced by: Tomoyuki Shimura (Japanese); Christopher R. Sabat (English)
An advisor in the castle, he disapproves of Shirayuki's closeness to Zen due to her lower social status. He hires Obi to scare her from the castle, but after an unsuccessful attempt and rebuke from Zen, is grudgingly resigned to leaving Shirayuki alone. His gruff appearance, voice, and personality often scare others.
Garak Gazeld (ガラク・ガゼルト, Garaku Gazeruto)
Voiced by: Yūko Kaida (Japanese); Rachel Robinson (English)
Garak is the chief pharmacist of Wistal Castle. She is rather eccentric and can alternate between humorous and demanding. Despite this, she is extremely talented and cares deeply about Shirayuki and Ryu.
Yatsufusa (八房)
Voiced by: Rei Yamahata (Japanese); Z. Charles Bolton (English)
Yatsufusa is Garack's assistant and is often seen wearing a large bandanna that obscures his eyes.
Viscount Blaker (ブレッカ 子爵, Burekka Shishaku)
Voiced by: Tokuyoshi Kawashima (Japanese); Duncan Brannan (English)
The viscount is the landlord of a small island on the coast of Clarines. Greedy and selfish, he attempts to exploit the island for its resources and then bribe Shirayuki in making the experiment that will determine its fate fail, but his schemes are ultimately discovered and he is put under arrest.
Kihal Toghrul (キハル・トグリル, Kiharu Toguriru)
Voiced by: Chiwa Saito (Japanese); Bryn Apprill (English)
A bird trainer from a small island under Viscount Blaker. She came to Wistal Castle to ask Zen's assistance in preventing Viscount Blaker from hunting the birds native to her island. She befriends Shirayuki, and later proves instrumental in rescuing Shirayuki from the vicious pirate gang 'The Claw of the Sea' (along with Popo, her bird).
Higata (ヒガタ)
Voiced by: Yusuke Handa
A fellow royal pharmacist training alongside Shirayuki under a separate mentor.
Hisame Rougis (ヒサメ・ルーギス, Hisame Rūgisu)
Voiced by: Takahiro Sakurai (Drama CD)
The second-born son of a powerful noble family and vice-captain of the Sereg Knight Circle. Five years prior to canon, he tried to intimidate Kiki into marrying him by challenging her to a duel to win her hand. He wanted to escape being in service to his older brother, the future head of the Rougis family, by marrying into a different earldom. Though he lost the duel, he continues to show interest in Kiki. Hisame and Kiki formed a temporary marriage agreement out of necessity during the Bergat incident to draw out those who were attacking Kiki's potential suitors. However, they reaffirmed their engagement after Kiki's marriage proposal to Mitsuhide was turned down. Hisame is implied to have had feelings for Kiki for years, and she seems to be slowly reciprocating.
Count Seiran (セイラン, Seiran)
Kiki's father and the current head of the Seiran family. He wants Kiki to take over as the family head, and is constantly suggesting suitors for her. He has also imposed a time limit on her service with Zen so that she may eventually return.
Haruto Wisteria (ハルト・ウィスタリア, Haruto Wisutaria)
Haruto is the mother of Izana and Zen, and the dowager Queen of Clarines. Her husband, Kain, died some time ago, which sent her into a frenzy of work and sickness that caused her to become "allergic" to the castle. She returns for Izana's coronation, before shortly returning north to continue acting as the warden of the Wirant region.
Zakura Shidnote (ザクラ・シドノト, Zakura Shidonoto)
An associate of Izana, he has a distinct scar over his nose. He is the Knight Commander of the Royal Guard, and has served Haruto in her capacity as warden of Wirant.
Kai Ulkir (カイ・ウルキル, Kai Urukiru)
Voiced by: Yūma Uchida (Japanese); Kyle Phillips (English)
One of the gatekeepers of Wistal Castle who seems to take interest about Zen and Shirayuki's relationship.
Shiira Eigan (シイラ・エイガン, Shīra Eigan)
Voiced by: Chiharu Sawashiro (Japanese); Cris George (English)
Another gatekeeper besides Kai. He is Kai's senior and just like Kai, he seems to take interest about Zen and Shirayuki's relationship.
Shuka (シュカ)
Voiced by: Tsubasa Yonaga (Japanese); Justin Briner (English)
A trainee soldier who is the only one unaffected when the strange disease affected the soldiers in Fort Laxdo. He helps Shirayuki to take care of the other soldiers and befriends her and the prince.
Shikito (シキト)
Voiced by: Yasuaki Takumi (Japanese); Ricco Fajardo (English)
The guard of Wistal Castle who goes along with Shirayuki and the viscount to the watchtower during the test to bring in the bird handlers from Kiharu's island for communication. Obi trusts Shikito to protect Shirayuki in Lilias when Obi must leave her during the Bergat incident.
Tsuruba Bergat (ツルバ・べルガット, Tsuruba Berugatto) and Tariga Bergat (タリガ・べルガット, Tariga Berugatto)
Twin brothers from House Bergat, a powerful clan from northern Clarines who oppose the crown for depriving them of their traditional territory when Haruto became the warden of Wirant. However, the twins secretly admire Haruto and feel unworthy to serve the royal family. They are introduced as new recruits to the Sereg Knight Circle. The brothers are reluctantly aware that their ruthless older brother Toka (トウカ), the head of the Bergat clan, views them as expendable pawns, including presenting the older twin Tsuruba as a suitor to Kiki Seiran. After Tsuruba and Tariga help thwart Toka's plan to undermine royal authority in Wirant by killing Prince Zen, the prince advises clemency for the twins when Touka is arrested and stripped of his title. Tsuruba becomes Viscount Bergat and the new head of the family, with expectations to rebuild the clan from within, while Tariga is assigned to Wirant Castle to rebuild the clan from outside.
Eisetsu Lugiria (エイセツ・ルギリア, Eisetsu Rugiria)
The head of House Lugiria, another powerful clan in northern Clarines, whose territory includes the Oriold checkpoint west of Lilias. He attempts to manipulate Obi, Shirayuki, and Ryu into investigating a potential traitor among his associates connected with Toka Bergat and a series of perfume-induced poisonings in exchange for allowing the propagation of non-toxic phostyrias plant in Oriold.

==== Lilias ====
Shidan (シダ)
A pharmacist stationed permanently at Lilias and chief of the pharmacology institute of Lilias. He is Kirito's uncle. A childhood friend of Garak Gazeld, he turned down her offer to work as a court herbalist because he did not want to be her assistant, though it is rumoured he aspires toward a higher position to court Garak as an equal. In Lilias, he worked with Shirayuki and Ryuu during the Orimmallys disease outbreak and later leads the research project to develop a non-toxic cultivar of the same plant.
Yuzuri (ユズリ, Yuzuri)
A botanist in Lilias, a northern city in the kingdom of Clarines. Cheerful and outgoing, she works with Shirayuki during the disease outbreak and befriends her.
Suzu (鈴)
Voiced by: Daiki Hamano (Drama CD)
A pharmacist and friend of Yuzuri in Lilias, he works with Shirayuki during the disease outbreak. He becomes a core member of the Orimmallys research team.
Kazaha (カザハ)
An eccentric herbalist in Lilias specializing in botany and a member of the Orimmallys research team. He has a competitive nature and comes from the same hometown as Izuru.
Izuru (イヅル)
Shidan's assistant, a pharmaceutical student and a member of the Orimmallys research team. She and Kazaha are rivals and came from the same hometown.
Haki Arleon (ハキ・アールリオン, Haki Ārurion)
Haki is head of the Lilias Academy district and Izana's fiancée. She has known Izana and Zen since childhood.
Makiri Arleon (マキリ・アールリオン, Makiri Ārurion)
The lord and warden of Lilias, a checkpoint city in northern Clarines famous for its scholars. He is Haki's brother.
Kirito (キリト)
A boy around Ryu's age, he is the nephew of Shidan. Kirito helped to in the search for a cure during the disease outbreak in Lilias after his friends began to fall ill. He befriends Ryu, though is occasionally bewildered by Ryu's emotionless behavior.
Rata Forzeno (ラタ・フォルゼノ, Rata Foruzeno)
A reclusive aristocrat and mineralogist from Lilias known for his research on wunderocks, glittering stones capable of producing light and heat. He previously served as a knight, but retired to devote his time to his studies. Shirayuki and Obi persuade him to join the research project to create seeds for a non-toxic cultivar of the glowing Orimmallys plant.

==== Lido ====
Atri (アトリ, Atori)
Voiced by: Romi Park (Japanese); Micah Solusod (English)
Zen's only close childhood friend. He worked as a palace archer in order to get close to Zen and lure him out to traitors from Lido. During a confrontation with Zen, Izana, and Mitsuhide, he is killed.

==== Tanbarun ====
Raj Schenazade (ラジ・シェナザード, Raji Shenazādo)
Voiced by: Jun Fukuyama (Japanese); Todd Haberkorn (English)
The prince of Tanbarun, orders Shirayuki to become his concubine after hearing of her red hair. When she escapes, he sends her poisoned apples that are mistakenly consumed by Zen. After discovering the true status of his unintended victim, he gives Zen the antidote. Raj is rather narcissistic and ignorant and often speaks without thinking. After being befriended by Shirayuki later in the story, he begins to mature as he embraces his duties as a prince. He has a close aide named Sakaki and two younger siblings.
Rona Schenazade (ロナ・シェナザード, Rona Shenazādo) and Eugena Schenazade (ユジナ・シェナザード, Yujina Shenazādo)
Voiced by: Inori Minase (Rona) and Mikako Komatsu (Eugena) (Japanese); Alexis Tipton (Rona) and Megan Shipman (Eugena) (English)
The younger twin siblings of Raj, the first princess and second prince of Tanbarun respectively. They support the relationship between Raj and Shirayuki.
Sakaki (サカキ)
Voiced by: Katsuyuki Konishi (Japanese); Robert McCollum (English)
Raj's close aide. He frequently answers questions addressed to the prince.
King Schenazade (シェナザード王様, Shanmezādo-ousama)
Voiced by: Atsushi Miyauchi (Japanese); Kent Williams (English)
King Schenazade is the king of Tanbarun and the father of Raj, Rona, and Eugena. He allows Zen and the others to go find Shirayuki with Raj when she was captured by Sea's Talon.
Mihaya (巳早)
Voiced by: Toshiyuki Toyonaga (Japanese); Clifford Chapin (English)
The third son of the former Earl of Sisk, he kidnapped and planned to "present" Shirayuki to rich people to earn money. He later brings a kidnapping attempt on Shirayuki to Zen's attention and helps to rescue her from pirates. He ends up working for Prince Raj's aide, Sakaki, in Tanbarun.

==== The Mountain's Lions ====
Mukaze (武風, Mukaze)
Voiced by: Tōru Ōkawa (Japanese); Brandon Potter (English)
Leader of the Mountain's Lions, a group dedicated to eradicating thieves. Mukaze also happens to be Shirayuki's father, a former noble of Tanbarun before his exile as a result of taking back his fiancée (Shirayuki's mother) when she was sent to be wed to his uncle. He held a grudge against Prince Raji since hearing that he had tried to forcefully take Shirayuki as a mistress, and as a result, forced her to flee the country. Additionally, Shirayuki was told that he deeply regretted not having been there to help her in time during said ordeal.
Kazuki (鹿月)
Voiced by: Sachi Kokuryu (Japanese); Justin Pate (English)
Often mistaken for female due to his "pretty" looks. He is a member of the Mountain's Lions, and kidnaps Shirayuki with the help of Itoya. He befriends Shirayuki when the pair of them are captured by the Sea's Talons.
Itoya (イトヤ)
Voiced by: Shintarō Asanuma (Japanese); David Trosko (English)
A member of The Mountain's Lions, he has a scar over left eye. He helped Kazuki during Shirayuki's abduction.

==== The Claw of the Sea ====
A pirate organization that is known for human trafficking. Kazuki was once a member, but left the organization after being traded to a rich nobleman. Kazuki and Shirayuki were kidnapped by them to provoke the Mountain Lions.

Umihebi (ウミヘビ; , lit. "Sea Snake")
Voiced by: Mitsuki Saiga (Japanese); Monica Rial (English)
Umihebi is the leader of the gang. A ruthless and violent woman, she and her gang members were later rounded up by palace guards and arrested in their base in Tanbarun.

==== Others ====
Torou (トロウ, Torou)
Voiced by: Nana Mizuki (Japanese); Elizabeth Maxwell (English)
An old associate of Obi's, she is surprised by his change after he joined Zen's group.

== Media ==
=== Manga ===
Snow White with the Red Hair is written and illustrated by Sorata Akizuki. It was serialized in Hakusensha's bi-monthly shōjo manga magazine, LaLa DX from August 10, 2006, to August 10, 2011, and later moved to the monthly LaLa on October 24, 2011, and is published in collected volumes by Hakusensha. As of May 2025, 27 volumes have been published in Japan. The eleventh volume ranked 21st in Oricon's weekly manga ranking for the week of January 6, 2014.

It has been licensed in North America by Viz Media, in France by Kana, and in Taiwan by Sharp Point Press.

==== Volume list ====
No.	Original release date	Original ISBN	English release date	English ISBN
1	July 31, 2007	978-4-592-18373-0	May 7, 2019	978-1-9747-0720-1
2	August 5, 2008	978-4-592-18374-7	July 2, 2019	978-1-9747-0721-8
3	March 5, 2009	978-4-592-18375-4	September 3, 2019	978-1-9747-0722-5
4	January 4, 2010	978-4-592-18376-1	November 5, 2019	978-1-9747-0723-2
5	December 29, 2010	978-4-592-18377-8	January 7, 2020	978-1-9747-0724-9
6	September 5, 2011	978-4-592-19105-6	March 3, 2020	978-1-9747-0725-6
7	March 5, 2012	978-4-592-19437-8	May 5, 2020	978-1-9747-0726-3
8	September 5, 2012	978-4-592-19438-5	July 7, 2020	978-1-9747-0727-0
9	March 5, 2013	978-4-592-19439-2	September 1, 2020	978-1-9747-0728-7
10	July 5, 2013	978-4-592-19440-8	November 3, 2020	978-1-9747-0729-4
11	January 4, 2014	978-4-592-19441-5	January 5, 2021	978-1-9747-0730-0
12	October 3, 2014	978-4-592-19442-2	March 2, 2021	978-1-9747-0731-7
13	April 3, 2015	978-4-592-19443-9	May 4, 2021	978-1-9747-0738-6
14	July 3, 2015	978-4-592-19444-6	July 6, 2021	978-1-9747-0732-4
15	January 5, 2016	978-4-592-19445-3	September 7, 2021	978-1-9747-0733-1
16	August 5, 2016	978-4-592-19446-0	November 2, 2021	978-1-9747-0734-8
17	March 3, 2017	978-4-592-19447-7	January 4, 2022	978-1-9747-0735-5
18	November 2, 2017	978-4-592-19448-4	April 5, 2022	978-1-9747-0736-2
19	June 5, 2018	978-4-592-19449-1	June 7, 2022	978-1-9747-0737-9
20	January 4, 2019	978-4-592-19485-9	August 2, 2022	978-1-9747-2017-0
21	September 5, 2019	978-4-592-22011-4	October 4, 2022	978-1-9747-2069-9
22	March 5, 2020	978-4-592-22012-1	December 6, 2022	978-1-9747-2070-5
23	April 5, 2021	978-4-592-22013-8	February 7, 2023	978-1-9747-2840-4
24	June 4, 2021	978-4-592-22014-5	April 4, 2023	978-1-9747-2906-7
25	May 2, 2022	978-4-59-222015-2	June 6, 2023	978-1-9747-3707-9
26	July 5, 2023	978-4-59-222016-9	June 4, 2024	978-1-9747-4592-0
27	May 2, 2025	978-4-592-22017-6	July 7, 2026	978-1-9747-6569-0

=== Anime ===
An anime television series adaptation was announced in the 2015 April issue of Hakusensha's LaLa magazine. The anime adaptation was produced by Warner Bros., Hakusensha, Showgate, The Klockworx Co. Ltd., Hakuhodo DY Media Partners, Docomo Anime Store, BS Fuji, and Bones, which handled the animation. The anime was directed by Masahiro Andō and the script was written by Deko Akao with character designs by Kumiko Takahashi. The opening theme was "Yasashii Kibou" (やさしい希望; lit. 'Gentle Hope') by Saori Hayami and the ending theme was "Kizuna ni Nosete" (絆にのせて) by Eyelis. Funimation licensed the series for streaming and DVD/Blu-Ray release in North America. AnimeLab acquired the streaming rights in Australia and New Zealand. Muse Communication licensed the series for streaming in Southeast Asia. An original anime DVD (OAD) was bundled with a limited edition release of the 15th manga volume, adapting three additional chapters of the manga (chapter 41, and both Volume 7's and 11's special chapters), which did not initially air on television. The OAD ending theme is "Ginsekai" (銀世界; lit. Snowy World) by Eyelis.

The second season of the anime television series aired in Japan from January 11, 2016 to March 28, 2016. The opening theme was "Sono Koe ga Chizu ni Naru" (その声が地図になる; lit. 'The Voice Will Become A Map') by Saori Hayami and Ending theme was "Page ~Kimi to Tsudzuru Monogatari~" (ページ 〜君と綴る物語〜; lit. Page-The Story To Write With You) by Eyelis.

==== Episode list ====
===== Snow White with the Red Hair =====
No. overall	No. in season	Title	Original release date
1	1	"Encounter... Changing the Color of Fate" "Deai... Irodzuku Unmei" (出会い…色づく運命)	July 6, 2015
Shirayuki is a skilled herbalist living in the country of Tanbarun, with a head of unusual, bright red hair. This makes trouble for her when she is chosen by the snooty Prince Raj Shenazard to be his concubine (a mistress), and instead of agreeing, flees to the neighboring city of Clarines by hitching a ride on a carriage. She also cuts her long red hair, leaving it behind still with a ribbon tied to it, as her clear refusal to obey the prince. Once in Clarines, tired and hungry from her journey, she calls at a house but no one answers, so she sleeps outside until the next morning when she meets Zen Wistalia and his companions Mitsuhide Lowen and Kiki Seiran. Zen offers her shelter in the house while making her confess the reason why she escaped. When a basket of apples arrives for Shirayuki, with her hair in the ribbon tied to the handle, Zen bites into one and collapses. At that point a soldier from Tanbarun appears, he confirms that the apples were poisoned by Raj who holds the antidote, which he will hand over to Zen only if Shirayuki becomes his concubine. Shirayuki is brought to the royal palace of Tanbarun where she meets a smug Raj. After bravely agreeing to his proposal in exchange for Zen's antidote, Zen suddenly appears to defend her, revealing his resistance to poisons. He also introduces himself to Prince Raj as the second prince of Clarines, which means that their countries could end up going to war if he disclosed that Prince Raj's attempted to poison him. Afraid that he would be disgraced, Prince Raj has no choice but to give up on Shirayuki and allow her to leave with Zen. She decides to follow him to his land.
2	2	"Following the Sound of Your Heart" "Tadoru wa Mune no Naru Hō e" (辿るは胸の鳴るほうへ)	July 13, 2015
Back in Clarines, Shirayuki treats Zen with herbs, and the following day she looks for a job as a herbalist in the city. Instead, she gets a suggestion to prepare for the exam for court herbalist apprentice. Feeling that this is her path, she travels to an island accompanied by Zen, to study and gather rare herbs. While in the island's forest she is captured by a man named Mihaya who has his eye on her red hair. In her cell Shirayuki takes advantage of the night to rub the ropes that tie her wrists against the rough wall, so that when her captor comes to leave food she can free herself, trapping Mihaya in his own cell. However, he manages to escape and corners her. She then places paralyzing herbs in her oil lantern and smashes them against the wall to release their paralyzing fumes. She jumps out of a window onto a branch and falls to the ground. During her captivity, Zen starts worrying about Shirayuki when he visits her place and is told by her landlady that she has not come back yet. Taralyzing gas only has a temporary effect on Mihaya so he can catch up with Shirayuki. Zen rescues her at the last minute and hands Mihaya over to the royal guards. Mihaya claims that the reason for capturing Shirayuki is to parade her to elevate his status since his family used to be wealthy but he is now penniless and in hiding.
3	3	"Shining Time of Promise" "Yakusoku, Kagayaku Sonotoki ni" (約束、輝くその時に)	July 20, 2015
Due to her closeness with Zen, Shirayuki is now a regular visitor to his castle with no restrictions. However, some doubt her intentions and conspire to separate her from the prince, one of whom being the gruff Lord Marquis Haruka. Suspecting that Shirayuki is trying to take advantage of Zen's social status as a prince, he hires a spy to scare her out of the castle but is unsuccessful. After she confronts Lord Haruka, her determination inspires the spy to leave the service of Lord Haruka and pledge allegiance to Zen, he introduces himself as Obi.
4	4	"From the Small Hand, a Burgeoning Concerto Resonates" "Mebuki no Kyōsōkyoku Hibiku, Chīsana Te" (芽吹きの協奏曲響く、小さな手)	July 27, 2015
Shirayuki takes the court herbalist exam during which her knowledge is tested. When Zen comes to check on her at the greenhouse she has been assigned to, the door is locked by one of her competitors locking them inside. Despite risking failing the test, she asks help from the prince to fix a serious issue she discovered. She eventually passes the test and is then assigned as an apprentice to Ryuu, a young child prodigy who is already working as a Court Herbalist. Shirayuki discovers that Ryuu is not good at reading people, and is considered by some a weird -and possibly dangerous- child who only studies poisonous plants, but they bond after he worries at seeing her cry and runs to ask for Zen's help. She is also handed out two ledgers, Zen's health records, one of which shows the various poisons he has been self-administered throughout his life, to build up a resistance.
5	5	"This Path, the Crystallization of Premonition" "Kono Michi wa Yokan no Kesshō" (この道は予感の結晶)	August 3, 2015
When the soldiers of Fort Laxdo mysteriously fall ill, Shirayuki is sent to find out what happened and seek a cure. She discovers that the sickness is caused by burning toxic wood left at the fort by a group of bandits, who took advantage of the soldiers' illness to plunder the armory. Shirayuki strains herself to the point of exhaustion to prepare medicine and care for the soldiers, who get better within a few days. At the same time, Obi is sent to find the bandits who are confronted and defeated by Zen and his party. Through this ordeal, the relationship between Zen and Shirayuki deepens, and she also earns the respect of others.
6	6	"The Back Full of Meaning" "Imi no Senaka" (意味の背中)	August 10, 2015
Izana, the crown prince of Clarines and Zen's older brother, returns unannounced to the castle. Wary of Zen's relationship with Shirayuki, someone of much lower social status, he invites prince Raj for a visit to Clarines with ill intentions. Izana confronts Zen and Shirayuki about the nature of their relationship, causing Shirayuki to doubt her place beside Zen. At a tea party, Raj blurts out a lie that Shirayuki and Zen are engaged to cover up his embarrassment of previously wanting her as his concubine and because he mistook Zen and Shiryuki's relationship.
7	7	"Let Me Hear the Melody of Your Smile" "Kikasete, Egao no Senritsu" (聞かせて、笑顔の旋律)	August 17, 2015
Gossip spreads around the castle and people noticing Shirayuki more because of what Raj mistakenly said. Meanwhile, Raj goes on a tour with his aide Sakaki to the medical wing, and in fear and worry that he could meet Shirayuki, begins to get a stomachache. When bumping into her, after an awkward moment, Sakaki asks him to be the man she would be proud of being the prince of her country, and he leaves saying that he already knows. The exchange is witnessed by Izana who tries once again to convince her to return to Tanbarun, which she unwavering rejects.
8	8	"Memories Draw Spirals of the Past" "Kioku wa Kako no Rasen o Egaite" (記憶は過去のらせんを描いて)	August 24, 2015
Troubled by the unwanted attention Shirayuki receives because of the engagement gossip, Zen sends his aide Obi to be her personal guard. When Zen and his loyal right hand Mitsuhide overhear Obi asking Shirayuki if she wishes Zen was not a prince, they remember the day, a few years back, Izana appointed Mitsuhide to be Zen's attendant, and how they got closer to each other.
9	9	"Feelings that Connect and Reach" "Tsunagari Todoku Omoi" (繋がり届く想い)	August 31, 2015
Obi stays at Shirayuki's side after she wakes up from her sleep caused by the alcohol she drunk unknowingly. Still dazed. she walks out of her quarters looking for a horse and despairing that she cannot ride, so Obi learns that she means to go back by herself to fort Laxdo to check on the soldiers. He tells her that during the few days he was away from the castle (allowed by Zen who was not sure he would ever come back), he went there himself. He reassures her that everybody is doing well, relays their messages to her, and hands over some rare herbs they sent as presents, Looking for Shirayuki, worried something might happen to her while inebriated, Zen finally recognizes Obi's merits and gives him over an official identification as his own private messenger.
10	10	"Inexperienced Heart, Going Deeper" "Kokoro Aoku, Motto Fukaku" (心蒼く、もっと深く)	September 7, 2015
In the castle gardens, Shirayuki meets Kihal and Popo, a young girl from a southern island and her pet bird. She is there to have an audience with Zen, and ask him to declare the island a nature reserve to protect the birds of Popo's species from hunters. Sadly, there is nothing Zen can do for Kihal's cause unless the birds can prove themselves useful for Clarines' society. And that's when Shirayuki comes up with an idea. Shirayuki jumps into the lake to find the bell that was fallen inside. Obi helps her also to solve the problem for Popo and Kihal. Meanwhile, Zen comes to find Shirayuki and kisses her in some days.
11	11	"Encountering... A Color for the First Time" "Deau··· Hajimete no Iro" (出会う···初めての色)	September 14, 2015
During the days after being kissed by Zen, Shirayuki becomes hopelessly flustered every time she faces Zen, while the prince, despite being eager for an answer from her, must leave with Mitsuhide and Kiki to Kihal's island. Once reunited, Zen and Shirayuki finally share their true feelings for each other.
12	12	"Goodbye of the Beginning" "Hajimari no Sayōnara" (始まりのさようなら)	September 21, 2015
The castle is open to the citizens for a festival and Zen disguises himself as a guard to enjoy it with Shirayuki and the others. During a play, an actress is forced to quit because of an injury, and Shirayuki, who went to give first aid, is chosen to replace her, unaware of the troupe leader's second intentions.
OVA	TBA	"Nandemo Nai Takaramono, Kono Pēji" (なんでもない宝物、この頁)	January 5, 2016
Now in a romantic relationship, Zen and Shirayuki go on their first official date together to one of the cities of Clarines. During their date, details regarding the history of Mitsuhide and Kiki's past are revealed, while some facts of Prince Raj's childhood are also explored.

===== Snow White with the Red Hair 2nd Season =====
No. overall	No. in season	Title	Original release date
13	1	"The Red that Spins Fate" "Unmei o Tsumugu Aka" (運命を紡ぐ赤)	January 11, 2016
It is a new day at the castle and Shirayuki helps clean the medical wing, while Zen continues with his royal duties while musing about his future with her. Suddenly Mihaya shows up to the surprise of everybody. He reveals disturbing news about a mysterious boy named Kazuki whose intention is apparently to kidnap Shirayuki. On top of that, Prince Izana summons Shirayuki to let her know that she is invited to attend a ball in Tanbarun, forcing her to make preparations for her upcoming departure.
14	2	"Eyes that Protect and Look Forward" "Mamoru Hitomi, Susumu Hitomi" (守る瞳、進む瞳)	January 18, 2016
It is Shirayuki's last day at the castle before her departure to Tanbarun. While she receives the proper education for the upcoming ball, Zen and the others look for the mysterious boy, Kazuki, who is after her. Zen trains every night by himself, being worried and frustrated that he cannot protect Shirayuki during her trip, and Obi challenges him to earn the right to accompany Shirayuki to Tanbarun instead of Mitsuhide. Convinced of the abilities of Obi, Zen allows him to accompany Shirayuki, placing his trust in him. After that Zen visits Shirayuki to share a few moments with her before their goodbye. The next day, Shirayuki and Obi leave accompanied by Lord Marquis Haruka, and after a few days they arrive in Tanbarun where they are greeted by Prince Raji.
15	3	"Indecision Caused By Confusion" "Mayou wa Tomadoi no Naka" (迷うは戸惑いの中)	January 25, 2016
While in Tanbarun, Shirayuki tries to improve her relationship with Raji. At the beginning it's awkward between them, but eventually Raji tries to make her visit more interesting by taking Shirayuki and Obi on a tour of the castle, during which they realize they are observed by many curious eyes. To avoid that, Raji takes Shirayuki and Obi down to old hidden passageways, but soon gets lost while looking for the exit to the greenhouse. Unbeknownst to them, Raji's siblings Rona and Eugena secretly follow, and are eventually discovered by Obi. The kids know their way around the passageways and lead the group to the right exit. At the greenhouse, Raji is questioned by his siblings on his feelings towards Shirayuki. In Clarines, prince Izana observes his brother and admits to Mitsuhide that he is testing Zen and Shirayuki's relationship to see how strong they truly are together. Later that day, When Zen asks Mitsuhide about his conversation with Izana, Kiki informs them that there's news on Kazuki, and that Mihaya is nowhere to be found. He has left the castle to go find Kazuki with the intention of capturing him for the reward, but is faced with a different proposal.
16	4	"The Name of that Step is Change" "Sono Ippo no Na wa, Henka" (その一歩の名は、変化)	February 1, 2016
Still in Tanbarun, Raji and Shirayuki continue to improve their relationship as they spend time together. Everybody in the castle is surprised of Raji's transformation thanks to Shirayuki's influence, and Rona and Eugena try their all to have her extend her stay. Both at the same time, Raji and Obi are beginning to reflect on their true feelings for Shirayuki. Back at Clarines Zen finally finds Mihaya who has returned to his room after escaping from Kazuki and his companions, revealing new information. Kazuki and his partners have discovered that Shirayuki is in Tanbarun and have set sail to capture her. Zen sends a message to Obi to warn him about the situation and prepares to leave for Tanbarun. Izana is against him leaving Clarines, but Zen stands his ground reaffirming his intentions towards Shirayuki, stating that he will one day marry her. He leaves for Tanbarun with Mitsuhide, Kiki and Mihaya, with the warning from Izana to not bring Shirayuki back if something happens that will force him to officially intervene as the prince of Clarines. On the night of the ball, the mysterious men seeking to kidnap Shirayuki finally arrive.
17	5	"Prologue of the Quietly Twisting Night" "Shizuka ni Karamaru Yoru no Joshō" (静かに絡まる夜の序章)	February 8, 2016
Shirayuki and Obi are attacked by Kazuki and his mysterious friend, Itoya. Obi fights to protect Shirayuki but during the assault he is distracted by Rona and Eugena entering the room after hearing cries of help, and is knocked unconscious. Kazuki and Itoya sedate Shirayuki and take her away, escaping into the night. After the twins sound the alarm, a frantic Raji sends guards out to search for her while Zen and the others finally arrive at the castle only to discover that Shirayuki is missing. Zen and Raji agree on working together to rescue her, while Obi by following their trail reaches and confronts Itoya. However, he is too late; the gang of pirates Kazuki and Itoya joined to find Shirayuki has turned against them, and they have taken her and the boy to an unknown location, where they are held captive.
18	6	"Many Different Resolves" "Ikutsumo no Ketsui" (いくつもの決意)	February 15, 2016
Shirayuki and Kazuki are having a hard time with the Claw of Sea Pirates. They attempt to escape, but the Pirates stop and interrogate them, finding out that their enemies the Lions of the Mountain want Shirayuki. Meanwhile, Zen and the others begin their search and soon reunite with Obi and meet the Lions of the Mountain leader. They all agree to work together to save Shirayuki and Kazuki. Eventually, Zen and the others discover the town where they are being held hostage. Kiki volunteers to be taken captive by the Pirates and soon reunites with Shirayuki.
19	7	"Wave of Determination" "Kakugo no Nami" (覚悟の波)	February 22, 2016
While Kiki updates Shirayuki and Kazuki on the situation, Zen and the others work together on their rescue. Raji and a flotilla of Tanbarun's merchants who responded to his plea go out to sea to stop the Claw of the Sea pirates and force them to seek refuge at their secret base. The pirates' ship escapes followed by Raji's ship, which he uses to ram theirs to pieces after they dock at the hideout. With their ship destroyed the pirates find themselves on land facing not only Zen and his companions, but also the Lions of the Mountains. They all got to the pirates' base thanks to Mihaya's knowledge of his father's shady business deals with them in the past. A fight ensues between the parties, during which Shirayuki and Kazuki are freed. The Claw of the Sea pirates are finally defeated and detained by Raji. When all quiets down, Shirayuki finally sees the leader of the Lions of the Mountain, who is, to the surprise of everyone, her father.
20	8	"The Temperature of a Smile, a Cherished Place" "Hohoemi no Ondo, Taisetsu na Basho" (微笑みの温度、大切な場所)	February 29, 2016
While Raji and his men return to Tanbarun to deal with the Pirates, Shirayuki and the others arrive at the Lions of the Mountains village, where a party is held to celebrate their victory. During their time together, Shirayuki learns why her father left her in the care of her grandparents and his history, including the reason why Kazuki had taken her. Shirayuki speaks with a guilt-ridden Obi and assures him that despite what happened, she does not blame him. Meanwhile, Zen and Mukaze have a private talk regarding Zen and Shirayuki's relationship, where Zen admits his love for her and receives Mukaze's blessing. Later, Shirayuki and Zen spend time alone together. They return to Tanbarun, where they reunite with Raji and attend a special ball in honour of Shirayuki's safe return. The next day, Shirayuki and the others say their goodbyes and begin their journey back to Clarines.
21	9	"When I'm with You" "Anata to Ireba······" (貴方といれば······)	March 7, 2016
On their way back to Clarines, it starts to rain and the group decide to stop for the night at a nearby Inn. While everyone enjoys being back together, Obi reflects on how much he has changed since meeting Zen and the others. He later reunites with Torou, an old acquaintance, who asks him to help her with a job. Obi sneaks away with Torou to an abandoned mansion to retrieve a young boy who ran away from home. They take care of the boy's bodyguards and have a moment to reminisce about their past together, but are interrupted when Zen and the others get to the mansion looking for Obi. Zen has a talk with Obi, telling him that he should have realized by now that around him are people who worry about him if he's not where he should be. They then resume their journey to Clarines and during the ride, Obi assures Shirayuki he has no intention of returning to his previous life.
22	10	"You Will Drink from the Spring of Intent" "Kimi o Uruowaseru no wa Ishi no Izumi" (君を潤わせるのは意志の泉)	March 14, 2016
While Shirayuki goes back to work at the castle, Zen is pressured by Prince Izana and Lord Haruka to hold a ball to find a suitable woman to marry. Zen refuses but eventually decides to have one marriage interview. The castle is suddenly ablaze with gossip about the marriage interview, and Shirayuki learns about it by overhearing the head herbalist mentioning it. However, to comply with his duty as a prince and at the same time to postpone the issue at least for a while, Zen holds a marriage interview with Kiki, whose identity is kept a secret. During the fake marriage interview, Zen and Kiki remember when she came to the castle, and when Kiki first met Mitsuhide. Only after the interview Zen learns from Obi that Shirayuki knew of the interview, but was aware it was with Kiki. Worried about what she might think, he finds her and explains the situation. Later that night, Zen is visited by prince Izana who informs him he will soon take a wife, after which Zen will be required to do the same. Zen reaffirms his will to be with Shirayuki and take her as his wife, to which Izana says he should make an effort to convince him to give their union his blessing.
23	11	"Because of Who You Are" "Aru ga Yue no Saki" (あるがゆえの先)	March 21, 2016
While in deep thought over his meeting with Izana, Zen has a little accident and is slightly injured. Mitsuhide seeks help by the Chief Herbalist but while in her office accidentally knocks a bottle over and inhales its contents. Because of that a deep part of Mitsuhide's personality emerges, making his loyalty towards Zen extremely strong. During the following days Mitsuhide refuses to leave Zen's side, driving him crazy. Eventually Shirayuki finds the antidote that allows Mitsuhide to revert to his normal self, albeit losing any recollection of his recent behaviour. Thanks to working out the cure, Shirayuki passes her exam and becomes an official court herbalist, ending her apprenticeship. Shirayuki is pleased, but remembers that soon she must make a decision regarding the future of her relationship with Zen.
24	12	"A Tale, My Path" "Soshite Monogatari, Watashi no Michi" (そして物語、私の道)	March 28, 2016
Sakaki and Mihaya are sent to Clarines to invest Shirayuki with the official title of "Friend of the Crown" of Tanbarun, following Raji's instructions. Prince Izana must therefore acknowledge her title, but nevertheless asks her about her intentions towards Zen, leaving her speechless. While Shirayuki reflects on her future, Sakaki tries to convince her to spend it at Raji's side, which she politely declines. Shirayuki wakes up very early the following morning having found her resolve, and asks Obi to help her find Zen. Zen comes running, and flustered and full of doubts Shirayuki asks him if it's okay for her to wish to be by his side, by a prince's side. Zen kisses her and brings her to the roof garden of the castle. Having not answered her question, he tells her that he already made his feelings towards her clear to prince Izana, and asks Shirayuki to wait for the moment when he will be able to give her an answer. Later they all see Sakaki and Mihaya off, and normal life resumes at the castle...
