= Sakura Tsukuba =

Japanese manga artist

- Born: February 16 Saitama Prefecture, Japan
- Areas: Manga artist, Character designer, writer
- Notable works: Penguin Revolution, Land of the Blindfolded
- Awards: Outstanding Work - Hikari no Dokeki Haru no Hi ni

Sakura Tsukuba (筑波 さくら, Tsukuba Sakura; born February 16) is a Japanese manga artist born in Saitama Prefecture, Japan.

== Biography ==
Tsukuba made her professional debut as a manga artist by winning the 'Outstanding Work' award in the 5th LaLa Mangaka Grand Prix held in 1994 for her work, Hikari no Dokeki Haru no Hi ni (光のどけき春の日に). Her winning work was later published in the July 10th issue of LaLa DX in the same year. After Hikari no Dokeki Haru no Hi ni, she published a one-shot titled, Mori no Koe (森の声; Voices of the Forest) in the October issue of LaLa in the same year.

Her next work, Tengoku Ichiban Chikai Tō (天国に一番近い島; The Island Nearest to the Land of the Heavens) was published in the March 10th issue of Lunatic LaLa, one of LaLa's special issue in 1995.

Mermaid Moon was Tsukuba's next one-shot was published in the January 10th issue of LaLa DX in 1996. Four months later, Hyakka Jimusho no Akuma (百花事務所の悪魔; The Demon in the Hyakka Administration Office) was published in the May 10th issue of the same magazine that published Mermaid Moon. It was later compiled into the second volume of her first series, Mekakushi no Kuni. Another one-shot, Matsuri no Ato (まつりのあと; After the Festival) was published in the November 10th issue of LaLa DX. This was compiled into the first volume of Mekakushi no Kuni.

In 1997, Tsukuba published 3 one-shots with the first titled as Banī Gēmu (バニー・ゲーム; Bunny Game) which was published in the July 10th issue of LaLa DX. Right after Bunny Game, another one-shot titled Machigaeru Otoko (間違える男) was published and compiled into the first volume of Mekakushi no Kuni. It was followed by Shunkan no Raiōsha (瞬間の来往者) in the November 10th issue of LaLa DX. Ame no Naka (雨の中) and Sennyū Rika-chan Hausu (潜入 リカちゃんハウス) was published in the September issue of LaLa DX and the November issue of Melody in 1998 respectively. Ame no Naka was also compiled into the third volume of Mekakushi no Kuni.

Her first series, Mekakushi no Kuni (目隠しの国; The Land of the Blindfolded) started serializing in the January issue of LaLa DX in 1999. The serialization continued in the same magazine for seven chapters, including one special chapter which was published in March issue of LaLa. Later the series was moved and continued in the August issue of LaLa in 2000 beginning from its eighth chapter. During the course of the serialization of Mekakushi no Kuni, three separate one-shots were serialized. They were Sennyū! Inyō'ryō (潜入!陰陽寮) which was published in the March issue of Melody in 2000 and Bāsudei Purezentsu (バースデイ・プレゼンツ; Birthday Presents) which was published in the July issue of LaLa in 2002 and Eden no Tobira (エデンの扉; The Door of Eden) was published in the May issue of a LaLa-Melody special collaborative issue, The LaLa×Melody. It was compiled into the second volume of Tsukuba's second series, Yoroshiku Master.

For 2004, she came up with another new series titled Yoroshiku Masutā (よろしくマスター; I'll Leave Everything to You Master) in the January issue of LaLa DX just as Mekakushi no Kuni ends in January issue of LaLa in 2004 with 40 chapters without including several special chapters. The series has 9 collected volumes in tankōbon format with 5 volumes in bunkōban format. After the end of Mekakushi no Kuni, Tsukuba published another one-shot titled, Amai Kami Ato (甘い咬みあと) in the May issue of LaLa before continuing Yoroshiku Master. Amai Kami Ato was also compiled into the first volume of Yoroshiku Master.

In the October issue of LaLa, she started another new series titled, Pengin Kakumei (ペンギン革命; Penguin Revolution). It ended in the January issue of LaLa in 2008, with 35 chapters without including a special chapter which was serialized in the November issue of LaLa DX in 2007. The chapter was compiled into the third volume of Yoroshiku Master. The series was compiled into 7 volumes in tankōbon format.

Yoroshiku Master is still ongoing as of October 2009, with 13 chapters compiled into 3 volumes. However, no new chapters were serialized since the January issue of LaLa DX.

Another two one-shots, Tonari no Inuyama-kun (となりの犬山くん) was published in the June issue of LaLa, while Shiro no Keiyaku (白の契約; The White Contract) was published in the September issue of LaLa DX.

For 2009, another one-shot, Hitomi Kara Desutinī (瞳からディスティニー) was published in the January issue of LaLa as well as making her official Melody debut by publishing a one-shot titled Akai Īto (赤いい糸; Crimson Colored Thread) in the October issue.

=== Personal life ===
Sakura Tsukuba was born on February 16 in Saitama Prefecture, Japan. She likes cooking, in which her favorite recipe is green curry. She also likes to do ethnic cooking. She likes both sweet and spicy food.

== Works ==
=== One-shots ===
- Mori no Koe
- Tengoku Ichiban Chikai no Tō
- Mermaid Moon
- Hyakka Jimusho no Akuma
- Matsuri no Ato
- Bunny Game
- Machigaeru Otoko
- Shunkan no Raiōsha
- Ame no Naka
- Sennyū Rika-chan House
- Sennyū! Inyō'ryō
- Birthday Presents
- Eden no Tobira
- Amai Kami Ato
- Tonari no Inuyama-kun
- Shiro no Keiyaku
- Hitomi Kara Destiny

=== Sent-in works ===
- Hikari no Dokeki Haru no Hi ni

=== Series ===
- Land of the Blindfolded (1998)
- Sweet Rein (よろしく・マスター, Yoroshiku Masutā) (2005)
- Penguin Revolution (2005)
