= Land of the Blindfolded =

Japanese manga series

- Cover of Japanese volume 9.

目隠しの国 (Mekakushi No Kuni)
- Genre: Romance, Supernatural
- Manga
- Written by: Sakura Tsukuba
- Published by: Hakusensha
- English publisher: NA: CMX Manga; SG: Chuang Yi; UK: CMX Manga
- Magazine: LaLa
- Original run: 1998 – 2004
- Volumes: 9

Land of the Blindfolded (Japanese: 目隠しの国, Hepburn: Mekakushi no Kuni) is a fantasy shōjo manga by Sakura Tsukuba. It was originally published in Japan by Hakusensha in LaLa magazine between 1998 and 2004 and collected in nine tankōbon volumes. It is licensed in English by CMX Manga in North America and Chuang Yi in Singapore. The series is about three clairvoyant high school students and their relationships.

== Plot ==
Kanade Otsuka is a high school girl who sees the future when she touches someone or something. Although she is uncomfortable being touched, she refuses to live her life in fear and uses her powers to help those she sees in trouble. One day, she meets Arou Naitou, a schoolmate who can see the past, yet he does not feel he can do anything with his knowledge. They also meet Namiki Masahiro, another student who can also see the future but has more control over his power than Kanade and uses it purely for selfish reasons.

== Characters ==
Kanade Otsuka (大塚かなで, Ōtsuka Kanade)
Kanade Otsuka is a high school girl who sometimes sees the future when she touches someone or something. Though she is uncomfortable being touched, she refuses to live her life in fear and uses her powers to help those she sees in trouble. In fact, cheerful and kind, Kanade does not always consider the consequences of her actions when she tries to change the outcome of her visions, often at the expense of her own safety (for example, trying to save her ex-firefighter grandfather from dying in a burning building as a young child). She can see the future once in a while. Kanade and Arou become a couple by the beginning of Volume 2.
Arou Naitou (内藤あろう, Naitō Arō)
He lost his mother a while ago, and always blamed himself. He lives with his father who is rarely at home, but they love each other all the same. An accomplished cook, Arou makes lunch for Kanade (and Namiki, the uninvited guest), who often mourns the fact that her cooking "wouldn't hold a candle to his". Shy and introverted, Arou opens up to no one but Kanade (and Namiki, his romantic rival with whom he often argues). Although Arou is quite popular and could easily go out with any girl in the school, he would never choose any of them over Kanade because Kanade is always able to cheer him up no matter how depressed or unhappy he is. He is named Arou-kun by his friends. Even though he and Namiki fight a lot because of Kanade (Arou always gets jealous), they really care about each other. He will always see the "Past" by touching someone. It wasn't always like this but his powers increased one night as he was desperately searching for his missing friend and mother.
Masahiro Namiki (並木昌廣, Namiki Masahiro)
Shunned by everyone because of his powers (including his parents and brother) he runs away and finds himself a job. Only his manager knows his secret, and they seem to really like each other and get along. Namiki is also very intelligent, and transferred from a very prestigious high school to go to Kanade and Arou's less prestigious school. Needless to say, he is at the top of his class. Once Namiki met Kanade, he realized that his powers could (and, arguably, should) be used for non-selfish reasons. He, like Arou, often worries about Kanade putting herself in danger to save other. In fact, he and Kanade met when Kanade stopped a man from crossing the street and getting hit by a car and he, unaware of the injury he has just avoided, the man tried to hit her only to be stopped by Namiki. He even has a dog (who is often central to the plot and to Namiki's development as a person) and a pet turtle because of Kanade. Namiki is rude and somewhat selfish, but he is really deep down inside he is really kind, and he has an unrequited love for Kanade. He can also see the future, but it's more powerful than Kanade's ability and he only sees the future when he wills it.
Eri Nakamura (中村エリ, Nakamura Eri)
Kanade's best friend since elementary school. She is madly in love with Ezawa, and tries to change her personality to please him before Kanade convinces her that she should be true to herself. She isn't the best cook, Eri nonetheless tries to improve such domestic skills to please Ezawa, with occasionally manages to be successful. Eri respects Kanade and Arou's powers, but does not learn about Namiki's.
Ezawa (江沢)
Eri's somewhat a loyal boyfriend, Ezawa never lacks attention from girls. His heart was softened by Eri. Other characters find it hard to read what he is thinking. Although he is invariably (and sometimes brutally) truthful, going to so far as to tell Eri with complete honesty how bad her cooking is, he nonetheless eats her less-than-appetizing cooking simply because she made it for him.

== Media ==
Land of the Blindfolded is published by Hakusensha in Japanese. It is licensed in English by CMX Manga in North America and by Chuang Li in Singapore.

No.	Original release date	Original ISBN	North America release date	North America ISBN
1	February 2000	978-4-592-17754-8	2004-11-01	978-1-4012-0524-9
2	July 2000	978-4-592-17765-4	2005-01-19	978-1-4012-0525-6
3	December 2000	978-4-592-17573-5	2005-04-20	978-1-4012-0526-3
4	June 2001	978-4-592-17574-2	2005-07-20	978-1-4012-0527-0
5	January 2002	978-4-592-17575-9	2005-10-19	978-1-4012-0528-7
6	2002-07-05	978-4-592-17576-6	2006-01-18	978-1-4012-1016-8
7	2003-03-05	978-4-592-17577-3	2006-03-15	978-1-4012-1017-5
8	2003-11-05	978-4-592-17578-0	2006-06-30	978-1-4012-1018-2
9	2004-04-05	978-4-592-17579-7	2006-09-13	978-1-4012-1052-6

== Reception ==
The first volume of the English edition was described by Booklist as "shōjo (manga for girls) at its best," saying "Sakura's storytelling captures the sweetness and angst of both high-school and first love, and the panel layout and backgrounds work well with the art to illustrate the narrative."
