= LaLa DX =

Japanese manga magazine

- Cover of the March 2008 issue of LaLa DX featuring Hiro Fujiwara's Takumi Usui from Kaichō wa Maid-sama!
- Categories: Shōjo manga
- Frequency: Bi-monthly
- Circulation: 15,900; (July–September 2026)
- First issue: July 9, 1983
- Company: Hakusensha
- Country: Japan
- Based in: Chiyoda, Tokyo
- Language: Japanese
- Website: Official website

LaLa DX is a Japanese shōjo manga magazine published by Hakusensha. It was first published on July 9, 1983, as a supplement magazine to LaLa, another of Hakusensha's shōjo manga magazines. Later it became the sister magazine to LaLa. The magazine was originally published as a quarterly, but now is released bi-monthly on the tenth of even-numbered months.

== Current serializing titles ==
- 4 Jigen – Kana Niza
- Prince Freya – Keiko Ishihara

== Past serializing titles ==
=== 0-9 ===
- 3 Hearts – Kaoru Ichinose

=== A ===
- Akagami no Shirayukihime – Akizuki Sorata
- Aoiro Toshokan – Mikase Hayashi
- Auto Focus – Aya Roppongi

=== B ===
- Ballad of a Shinigami – Asuka Izumi
- Bell – Mikoto Asō

=== C ===
- Cluster Edge – Wan Komatsuda
- Chikyū Kanri-nin – Makoto Mori
- Chikyū Kōshinkyoku – Mikase Hayashi

=== F ===
- Film Girl – Shigeyoshi Takagi

=== G ===
- Gen'ei Kitan – Shiho Inada
- Gensō Kajin – Chiaki Karasawa

=== H ===
- Hana ni Arashi – Shigeyoshi Takagi
- Hana no Namae – Ken Saitou
- Hanatsuki-hime – Wataru Hibiki
- Harukanaru Toki no Naka de – Tōko Mizuno
- Harukanaru Toki no Naka de 5 – Tooko Mizuno
- Hiiro no Isu – Yuki Midorikawa
- Himitsu no Himegimi Uwasa no Ōji – Mato Kauta
- Himegimi no Tsukurikata – Asuka Izumi
- Honey – Yutaka Tachibana
- Hoshi-yomi no Yogensha – Natsuna Kawase
- Hyakujū Kingdom – Shigeyoshi Takagi

=== I ===
- Ibara no Okite – Yuni Yukimura
- IDOLiSH7 Re:member – Tanemura Arina

=== J ===
- Jun'ai Station – Kei Tanaka
- Jūni Hisoku no Palette – Nari Kusakawa

=== K ===
- Kaichou wa Maid-sama! – Hiro Fujiwara
- Kana, Kamo. – Yutaka Tachibana
- Katakoi Triangle – Shinobu Amano
- Kazoku Gokko – Chiaki Karasawa
- Kids Talk – Nozomi Yanahara
- Kimi no Umi e Ikō – Fumika Okano
- Kimi to Himitsu no Hanazono – Mikase Hayashi
- Kingyo-sō – Yuki Fujitsuka
- Koto no Ha – Mikoto Asō
- Kyōryū na Haisha-san – Masami Morio

=== L ===
- Lapis Lazul no Ōkan – Natsuna Kawase
- Lovely Hyakka Jiten – Fumika Okano

=== M ===
- Mademoiselle Butterfly – Akane Ogura
- Maruichi-teki Fūkei – Nozomi Yanahara
- Megane Danshi Shinkasetsu – Kaoru Ichinose
- Mekakushi no Kuni – Sakura Tsukuba
- Mikado no Shihō – Emiko Nakano
- Mikaduki Pan – Asuka Sasada
- Mochimochi no Kamisama – Masami Morio
- Momoyama Kyōdai – Yuki Fujitsuka
- Mujūryoku Aria – An Tsukimiya
- My Darling! Miss Bancho – Mayu Fujikata

=== N ===
- Natsume Yūjinchō – Yuki Midorikawa
- Neko Love – Rika Yonezawa
- Ningyō-shi no Yoru – Yutaka Tachibana
- Nobara no Hanayome – Yū Toyota
- Nushi-sama Series – Megumi Wakatsuki

=== O ===
- Onsen de Aimashō – Chiaki Karasawa
- Otenki no Miko – Nozomi Yanahara

=== P ===
- Pajama de Goron – Asuka Sasada
- Present wa Shinju – Ken Saitō

=== R ===
- Rakuen Route – An Tsukimiya

=== S ===
- Saint Hyper Keibitai – Masami Morio
- Shabekuri King – Rika Yonezawa
- Shōnen Dolls – Wataru Hibiki
- Sugar Family – Akira Hagio
- Suits no Kuni no Mahoutsukai – Kaoru Ichinose
- Sweet Rein (よろしく・マスター, Yoroshiku Masutā) – Sakura Tsukuba

=== T ===
- Taiyou mo Wasure Sasete – Kaoru Ichinose
- Tennen Sozai de Ikō – Mikoto Asō
- Teppen! – An Tsukimiya
- Tobenai Majo – Natsuna Kawase
- Tokage Ōji – Asuka Izumi
- Torikae Fūka Den – Nozomi Yanahara
- Toshokan Sensō Love&War – Kiiro Yumi
- Trouble Dog – Aya Roppongi

=== U ===
- Uchi no Pochi no Yūkoto niwa – Yutaka Tachibana
- Umewaka Torimonochou – Kaoru Ichinose

=== V ===
- Vamp Series – Yutaka Tachibana
- Vampire Knight – Matsuri Hino
- Variety – Asuka Sasada

=== W ===
- With!! – Ken Saitou

=== X ===
- Xazsa – Junko Tamura

=== Y ===
- Yashio to Mikumo – Nari Kusakawa

=== Z ===
- Zettai Heiwa Daisakusen – Akane Ogura
