= Gatcha Gacha =

Japanese manga series

- Cover of the first volume of Gatcha Gacha as published by Hakusensha

ガッチャガチャ
- Manga
- Written by: Yutaka Tachibana
- Published by: Hakusensha
- English publisher: NA: Tokyopop (former)
- Magazine: Hana to Yume
- Original run: 2001 – 2008
- Volumes: 8

Gatcha Gacha (Japanese: ガッチャガチャ) is a Japanese manga series by Yutaka Tachibana. The story centers on the struggling high school girl Yuri Muroi. The series was licensed in English by Tokyopop, with the first volume released on March 7, 2006, and the eighth volume released in December 2010.

== Story ==
Yuri Muroi, a promiscuous girl with a reputation among the male student body, has just broken up with her eleventh boyfriend; her previous boyfriends have always dumped her. She soon meets playboy Yabe Takahiro, and begins to think he might be her true love. Yabe, however, decides the only girl he will date seriously is Motoko Kagurazaka, the most popular girl in school. Kagurazaka displays no interest in him, but might secretly like him.

Muroi has a suitor of her own: Sho Hirao, the student body president. Hirao is clumsy and tactless around girls. He is in love with Yuri, because she, unlike other girls, never seems to be affected by his inadvertently harsh words. As Yuri is drawn into a friendship with Yabe, Motoko, and Hirao, she begins to learn the horrible truth between Yabe, Motoko and her dead sister Kanako and a terrible past that will never be fixed.

== Characters ==
Yuri Muroi
The main character of Gatcha Gacha. She has a cheerful, upbeat demeanor that can somewhat darken into fierce determination when she is defending those she loves. It is mentioned that she went as far as breaking the end off a vinegar bottle to defend her little brothers from a threatening ex-boyfriend; and she has often been involved in many catfights with girls (because of their jealous behaviors) as well. Muroi, whose mother died when she was young, takes care of her twin brothers. And because of a note from her mother who told her to make the best of life... Yuri strives to do just that.
She is madly in love with Yabe and has had 13 boyfriends—all of whom were losers that broke up with her, usually after cheating on her. Most of them had told her that her feelings were "too heavy" for a comfortable relationship, and now that phrase acts as a taboo for her. Only now is she beginning to understand Motoko's past and how Yabe is connected to it. Yuri is Motoko's second lackey. In the final volume, Yuri decided to go out with Hirao, although she has not yet fallen in love with him. Even though Yuri is heterosexual, she was attracted to Motoko when she was dressed up as a guy and often blushes when she smiles, even when she is dressed like a normal girl. At one point, Motoko asks Yuri if she would date her if she was a guy to which Yuri exclaimed, "You're a guy?!" Although Motoko said she was just joking, she looked very serious when she asked Yuri if she would be interested in a guy version of her.
In the last novel, Yuri has a dream about a prince who rescues her and then tries to initiate sex. At the end of the book, Yuri realizes that the "prince" was in fact Motoko. The last book also makes a few more hints at Motoko having romantic feelings towards Yuri, and the ending doesn't explicitly state that Yuri doesn't feel the same way. Yuri seems to blush near Motoko's presence, and she states that she trusts Motoko more than anyone else in the world and that she is the "kindest person I've ever known." When Yuri is being held captive, she helplessly screams "Motokooooo!" instead of "Kagurazaka-San," which is what she always calls Motoko. She doesn't yell for Hirao or Yabe. On the last page, Yuri tells Motoko: "You make my heart skip a beat!" Book eight leaves the reader to decide who Yuri will end up with: Motoko or Hirao. The captions state that it may already be "too late" for Hirao to win over Yuri's heart. This hints that she likes Motoko. Also, in an extra scene, Yuri calls Motoko "Motoko" instead of "Kagurazaka-San," and asks her if she would like to walk home with her. In Japan, calling someone by their first name with no honorifics symbolizes intimacy.
Motoko Kagurazaka
The most beautiful, and mysterious girl in the fictional school of Meirin High. She has the ability to be the most popular girl in the school, however she does not socialize very well. She is tall thin, and blonde. To describe her physical appearance in one word, Motoko is "stunning". Her dark personality belies her physical appearance. She enjoys fist fights, extortion, threatening others, and acting like a yakuza. However, she is faithful to her friends and has a keen sense of justice. She is humble, and she often chooses not to take credit for her good actions. Motoko is physically extremely strong, but mentally weak. Her hobbies include spying on girls, though she insists not to be lesbian. Motoko Kagurazaka is the most popular character in the story for Gatcha Gacha fans. Although Motoko loves to spend her free time staring at hot girls and reading porn magazines for men, she insists that she is not lesbian. However, she seems to harbor mild protective and romantic feelings for Yuri. (E.g., when Kanako threatened to hurt Yuri, Motoko told Kanako that she would literally kill her if she did anything to hurt Yuri.) Although Motoko gets very defensive when her friends ask her if she is gay, she most likely is. Motoko shows much interest in women but no interest in men and seems to have feelings for Yuri (e.g.: Motoko has only ever truly smiled to Yuri and at one point, flirted with her when she was dressed up as a guy).
In the last novel, Motoko cuts her hair back to its original boy-ish style when it gets stuck against a nail in a baseball bat. This is when she is fighting some thugs in order to rescue Yuri. The last book once again hints that Motoko may be in love with Yuri, and the last scene is her smiling at Yuri, who is blushing and confessing: "You make my heart skip a beat!" The captions state that it may already be "too late" for Hirao to win over Yuri's heart. This hints that she likes Motoko. Also, in an extra scene, Yuri calls Motoko "Motoko" instead of "Kagurazaka-San," and asks her if she would like to walk home with her. In Japan, calling someone by their first name with no honorifics symbolizes intimacy. When Yuri is being held captive, she helplessly screams "Motokooooo!" instead of "Kagurazaka-San," which is what she always calls Motoko. She doesn't yell for Hirao or Yabe.
Takahiro Yabe
The playboy of the fictional school. He used to be a kendo champion, but mysteriously quit a few years ago. His wanton behavior often leads to trouble with his various girlfriends. He had decided that the only girl he would ever date was Motoko, feelings she did not return. He is completely admired by Yuri whom he later dates, but then dumps in volume 5. Yabe is a kind hearted, open minded guy who is very fond of Hirao even though Hirao hates him. In the end, Kanako and Yabe get together and Yabe and Yuri remain good friends.
Sho Hirao
The student body president of the fictional school. He is often tactless around girls, but he really loves Yuri. Hirao is admired by many women in the school but is completely oblivious. Hirao hates Yabe, but Yabe really likes Hirao and tries to help him out with Yuri. Although in the last book, Yuri seems to be returning his feelings, she also seems to have feelings for Motoko. While Yuri is most likely straight, the captions on the last page state that it may already be "too late" for Hirao to win over Yuri's heart. These captions appear when Yuri tells Motoko "You make my heart skip a beat!" Also, in an extra scene, Yuri calls Motoko "Motoko" instead of "Kagurazaka-San," and asks her if she would like to walk home with her. In Japan, calling someone by their first name with no honorifics symbolizes intimacy. When Yuri is being held captive, she helplessly screams "Motokooooo!" instead of "Kagurazaka-San," which is what she always calls Motoko. She doesn't yell for Hirao or Yabe.
Tomoharu Sekine
Sekine is Motoko's first lackey who appears often, but holds little importance to the story. He is a cute boy who is the target of all gay molesters. Since Motoko rescued him from one, he now has to obey her every wish. Sekine is madly in love with her. At the end of the series, Sekine is shown dressing up like a girl to get Motoko's attention, but he fails to do so. There is a 0% chance that Motoko and Sekine will ever get together because she is most likely a lesbian in denial.
Kanako Kagami
She was the former Kanako Kagurazaka, the elder sister of Motoko, who was believed to have been dead. Actually, she was alive after the heart surgery, but her grandfather and Motoko hid the truth from Takahiro and the Yabe family, and sent her to the Kagami family for adoption. She is madly in love with Motoko (some kind of yuri, or lesbian relationship). Motoko does not return these feelings. When Kanako returns, she has shown a major change in attitude. She is not clingy with Motoko anymore and she shows feelings for Yabe whom she begins to date in the end. However, at the beginning of volume 6, she threatens to make Yuri suffer, but Motoko tells Kanako that if she does anything to hurt Yuri, or if she even touches her, she'll kill her. Even after the death threat, Kanako still gets into a physical fight with Yuri. In a flashback in volume 2, Motoko remembers Kanako saying, "I love you Moto-chan," while appearing to be taking off her clothes. This reveals a small, but possible hint that Kanako and Motoko may have had sex. Although, there is a slim to no chance that this happened seeing as Motoko probably turned Kanako down.
In the last book, Kanako and Yabe are dating.
