= Absolute Obedience =

2005 video game

- Developer: Langmaor
- Publisher: Will JP JAST USA/Peach Princess US
- Designer: Yura
- Platform: Windows
- Release: JP: April 22, 2005; NA: October 16, 2006
- Genres: BL game, dating sim
- Mode: Single player

Absolute Obedience, known in Japan as Zettai Fukujuu Meirei (絶対服従命令), is a Japanese visual novel, with a story in the yaoi genre set in postwar West Germany. The game was one of the first yaoi games to receive an official English translation.

== Overview ==
The game is set in post-World War II West Germany. One storyline involves a motorcycle race to the Berlin Wall and back, pushing the setting sometime after 1961. The player takes the role of either Kia WelBehenna or Louise Hardwich, one of the two members of a secret agency run by Hardwich. The two are assigned specific targets, which range from members of the KGB to aspiring soccer players. The requests usually include seducing the targets.

== Gameplay ==
Game interaction is extremely limited, as Absolute Obedience is a visual novel. Most of the game consists of reading text and viewing stationary artwork, most of which is yaoi-themed.

Player input is limited to the option to choose one of two paths at a few junctions in the story, which lead to different endings. The primary goal is to fulfill the client's requests and complete the mission.

Each of the 12 stories has up to 4 different endings, with a total of 42 different endings and 2 additional endings. In order to obtain a good ending, the player must make the correct choices. Some requests lose options and become listed as "expired". Each mission is given a grade: A, B, C, or D.

When the game has been successfully completed with an A grade in each request, two additional secret missions are unlocked for both Kia and Louise, in which more of both their pasts is revealed.
