= Akane Ogura =

Japanese manga artist

Akane Ogura 小椋アカネ
- Born: October 25 Nagoya, Aichi, Japan
- Areas: Character design, writer, Manga artist
- Notable works: Zettai Heiwa Daisakusen
- Awards: Fresh Debut – Purity 999.9; Outstanding Debut – Mademoiselle Butterfly

Akane Ogura (小椋アカネ, Ogura Akane; born October 25) is a Japanese manga artist from Nagoya, Aichi Prefecture, Japan. She resides in Tokyo.

Her one shot Eikyū Shōjo (永久少女) was published in the March 2013 issue of Hakusensha's bi-monthly shōjo manga magazine LaLa DX. Hakusensha also publishes her series 彼女になる日 (Kanojo ni Naru Hi) and 彼女になる日 another (Kanojo ni Naru Hi another).

== Career ==
Akane Ogura began her career as a manga artist with her first work entitled Purity 999.9 which was published in LaLa DX's July issue of 2001. She gained the Fresh Debut award in the 26th LaLa Manga Grand Prix with Purity 999.9.

In October of the same year, Beni'iro Kyōsō Kyoku (紅色狂騒曲) was also published in LaLa DX's November issue. The following month, Kimi no Omoi de (きみの思い出) appeared in LaLa DX's January issue of 2002. It was later compiled into the first volume of Ogura's second series Mademoiselle Butterfly.

On April 10, 2002, Watashi no Suteki na Hito (わたしのすてきなひと) was published in LaLa DX's May issue. Soon after, she began her first short work consisting of two chapters, Mayonaka mo Jugyōchū (真夜中も授業中). The chapters were published in LaLa DX's January and March issue of 2003 respectively. They were never collected into tankōbon.

Exactly a year after she published Mayonaka mo Jugyōchū, a one-shot titled Ō-sama Yūgi (王様遊戯) appeared in LaLa DX's March issue of 2004. In LaLa DX's November issue, Ogura started serializing her first series, Madomowazeru Batafurai (マドモワゼルバタフライ; Mademoiselle Butterfly).

In between the serializations of Mademoiselle Butterfly, she managed to do another one-shot, Natsu no Rekuiemu (夏のレクイエム; Natsu no Requiem) which was published in the September issue of LaLa. After having nine chapters, Mademoiselle Butterfly ended in the September 2006 issue of LaLa DX. It was compiled into two volumes. The series was also given the Outstanding Debut award in the 30th Hakusensha Athena Newcomers' Award. She continued working by having Ojō-sama to Amai Yūtsu (お嬢様と甘い憂鬱) in the November issue of LaLa.

In 2007, she published another short work which consisted of three chapters titled Ten'imuhō Purinsesu (天衣無縫プリンセス; Ten'imuhō Princess) in LaLa DX. It was serialized between January and May of the same year. Like Mayonaka mo Jugyōchū, it was not collected into tankōbon. Later in September, she began a new series in LaLa DX titled Zettai Heiwa Daisakusen (絶対平和大作戦) which ended in 2010. It has been collected into 4 volumes. A one-shot, Dr.Rabitto (Dr.ラビット; Dr.Rabbit) was published in the November issue of LaLa DX of the same year. In 2008, aside from working on her series Zettai Heiwa Daisakusen, she published a one-shot titled Jīniasu Hausu (ジーニアス・ハウス; Genius House) in LaLa Special.

Her manga 彼女になる日 (Kanojo ni Naru Hi) is serialized in AneLaLa while 彼女になる日 another (Kanojo ni Naru Hi another) is serialised in LalaDX. Both series have been collected in tankōbon. The first volumes were released on July 5, 2013, and May 2, 2014, respectively. The second volume of Kanojo ni Naru Hi another will be released on March 5, 2015.

== Works ==
=== One-shots ===
- Beni'iro Kyōsō Kyoku
- Kimi no Omoide
- Watashi no Suteki na Hito
- Ō-sama Yūgi
- Natsu no Requiem
- Ojō-sama to Amai Yū'utsu
- Dr. Rabbit
- Genius House
- Rhapsodia in Blue
- Eikyū Shōjo

=== Sent-in works ===
- Purity 999.9

=== Short works ===
- Mayonaka mo Jugyōchū
- Ten'imuhō Princess

=== Series ===
- Mademoiselle Butterfly
- Zettai Heiwa Daisakusen
- Kanojo ni Naru Hi
- Kanojo ni Naru Hi another
