= Vampire Knight =

2004 shōjo manga series and its adaptations

- First tankōbon volume cover

ヴァンパイア騎士(ナイト) (Vanpaia Naito)
- Genre: Dark fantasy; Romance; Supernatural
- Manga
- Written by: Matsuri Hino
- Published by: Hakusensha
- English publisher: AUS: Madman Entertainment; NA: Viz Media
- Magazine: LaLa
- English magazine: US: Shojo Beat
- Original run: November 24, 2004 – May 24, 2013
- Volumes: 19
- Anime television series
- Directed by: Kiyoko Sayama
- Written by: Mari Okada
- Music by: Takefumi Haketa
- Studio: Studio Deen
- Licensed by: AUS: Madman Entertainment; NA: Viz Media; UK: Manga Entertainment
- Original network: TXN (TV Tokyo), AT-X
- English network: AU: ABC3; NA: Neon Alley
- Original run: April 8, 2008 – December 30, 2008
- Episodes: 26
- Manga

Vampire Knight: Memories
- Written by: Matsuri Hino
- Published by: Hakusensha
- English publisher: NA: Viz Media
- Magazine: LaLa DX
- Original run: June 10, 2016 – August 5, 2025
- Volumes: 11
- icon

Vampire Knight (Japanese: ヴァンパイア騎士(ナイト), Hepburn: Vanpaia Naito) is a Japanese manga series written by Matsuri Hino. It was serialized in Hakusensha's shōjo manga magazine LaLa from 2004 to 2013, with its chapters collected in nineteen tankōbon volumes. The manga series is licensed in English by Viz Media, which has released all nineteen volumes. The English adaptation was serialized in Viz Media's Shojo Beat manga magazine from 2006 to 2009.

The story takes place in the prestigious Cross Academy, which is home to two distinct classes: The Day class, which applies to only humans, and the Night Class, which applies to only vampires, of which the day class is unaware. Much of the plot revolves around Yuki Cross, the headmaster's adopted daughter, as she is being drawn into a conflict concerning the overall coexistence between humans and vampires and the twisted reality concerning her childhood friend Zero Kiryuu, who, despite having a hatred for vampires, is revealed to be slowly turning into one of their kind.

Two drama CDs were created for the series, as well as a twenty-six episode anime adaptation based on the first two sagas. Produced by Studio Deen, the anime series' first season aired in Japan on TV Tokyo between April and July 2008. The second season, aired on the same station from October to December 2008. The anime adaptation was licensed for release in North America by Viz Media.

== Plot ==
Ten years ago, Yuki was rescued from a vampire attack on a winter night by Kaname Kuran, a Pureblood vampire. She now lives with the headmaster of Cross Academy, Kaien Cross, as his adopted daughter, and she serves as a school guardian. Her job is to protect the Day Class students and conceal the fact that the Night Class is composed of vampires. She works alongside her childhood friend, Zero Kiryu, who is also a guardian. Zero resents vampires because they destroyed his family. His attitude contrasts with the academy's official goal of achieving peaceful coexistence between humans and vampires. This fragile peace is constantly tested, raising questions about the vampires' true intentions and the potential dangers of the arrangement, with Yuki's forgotten past closely tied to these tensions.

== Media ==
=== Manga ===
Written and illustrated by Matsuri Hino, Vampire Knight was serialized in Hakusensha's shōjo manga magazine LaLa from November 24, 2004, to May 24, 2013. The individual chapters were collected and published in nineteen tankōbon volumes, released from July 10, 2005, to November 5, 2013.

In North America, the manga was licensed for English release by Viz Media. The series ran in the publisher's Shojo Beat manga anthology from the July 2006 issue until the July 2009 issue; the magazine's final issue. The nineteen volumes were released from January 2, 2007, to October 14, 2014. In Australia and New Zealand the manga was licensed by Madman Entertainment.

==== Sequel ====
After the manga's conclusion, Hino released a series of special chapters, which take place after the end of the final volume. Hino released the first special chapter titled "Life" (命, Inochi) in LaLa Fantasy on November 8, 2013, which was licensed and released digitally by Viz Media on December 9, 2014. The following chapters were released in LaLa DX. The second special chapter, titled "I Love You" (あなたのことが好きです, Anata no Koto ga Sukidesu), was released on February 10, 2015. The third special chapter, titled "Love's Desire" (愛の望み, Ai no Nozomi), was released on December 10, 2015. The fourth and final special chapter, "Between Death and Heaven" (命の終わりと天国の間, Inochi no Owari to Tengoku no Aida), was released on February 10, 2016. The chapters were collected as the first volume of a sequel manga, Vampire Knight: Memories, released on June 3, 2016; Vampire Knight: Memories itself officially launched in LaLa DX on June 10 of that same year. The series finished on August 5, 2025, and its eleventh and final volume was released on December 5, 2025. The series is also licensed for English release by Viz Media.

A special one-shot chapter is set to be published in LaLa on August 4, 2026, as part of the magazine's 50th anniversary celebration.

=== Anime ===
Vampire Knight was adapted into a thirteen episode anime television series by Studio Deen, which was broadcast on TV Tokyo from April 8 to July 1, 2008. (Note: TV Tokyo listed the air dates for the series on Monday at 25:00, which is effectively Tuesday at 1:00 a.m. JST.) A second thirteen-episode season, Vampire Knight Guilty, was broadcast from October 7 to December 30, 2008. (Note: TV Tokyo listed the air dates for the series on Monday at 25:00, which is effectively Tuesday at 1:00 a.m. JST.)

The series uses four pieces of theme music. The opening themes of both the first and second season are performed by the duo On/Off, with "Futatsu no Kodō to Akai Tsumi" (ふたつの鼓動と赤い罪) as the opening for the first season, and "Rinne Rondo" (輪廻 -ロンド-, Rinne) as the opening for the second one. Kanon Wakeshima performs the first season ending theme, "Still Doll", and also the second season's ending theme "Suna no Oshiro" (砂のお城). The soundtrack is composed by Takefumi Haketa and consists of 30 tracks (including the opening theme and ending theme).

In North America, the series was licensed by Viz Media. In the UK, the first volume was officially released on DVD via Manga Entertainment on November 22, 2010. In Australia, ABC3 aired the series in 2011.

=== Light novels ===
Three light novels created by Matsuri Hino and Ayuna Fujisaki were published in Japan by Hakusensha in 2008 (the first two novels) and 2013 (the third), respectively. The novels feature side-stories that use the characters of the manga, but are not specifically based on chapters from the series. The first novel, Vampire Knight: Ice Blue Sin (ヴァンパイア騎士 憂氷の罪, Vanpaia Naito: Aisu Burū no Tsumi), was published on April 5, 2008. The first story within the novel looks at an incident that occurred at Cross Academy in the year preceding Yuki's arrival about a Day Class student named Fuka Kisaragi, while the second story details an incident that occurred while Zero was still in training to be a vampire hunter alongside Kaito Takamiya, another boy training under Toga Yagari to be a vampire hunter.

The second novel, Vampire Knight: Noir's Trap (ヴァンパイア騎士 凝黒の罠, Vanpaia Naito: Nowāru no Wana), was published on October 3, 2008. The story focuses on two minor characters, Nadeshiko Shindo and Kasumi Kageyama, from the manga, following their respective unrequited love at Cross Academy, as well as detailing a case that happened when Akatsuki Kain and Ruka Souen go to visit Senri Shiki and Rima Toya's modeling studio.

The third novel, Vampire Knight: Fleeting Dreams (ヴァンパイア騎士ト 煌銀の夢, Vanpaia Naito: Flail no Yume), was released in 2014, featuring side-stories about Rido Kuran, Sara Shirabuki, and Yuki's and Zero's activities during the timeskip. The third novel is the only novel thus far to have been licensed by Viz Media and released in North America.

=== Other media ===
A drama CD, titled LaLa Kirameki Drama CD (LaLa キラメキ★ドラマCD), which features audio dramas for five LaLa titles, including Vampire Knight, was included with the magazine's September 2005 issue, released on July 23 of that same year. Three drama CDs based on the series have been produced: Midnight CD-Pack; Moonlight CD-Pack; and Pureblood CD-Pack.

Vampire Knight DS (ヴァンパイア騎士 DS, Vanpaia Naito Dīesu) is a Japanese dating simulator based on the series that was released by D3 Publisher in Japan in January 2009.

In November 2008, the official Vampire Knight, titled Vampire Knight Fanbook: Cross (ヴァンパイア騎士 ファンブックX, Vanpaia Naito Fanbukku Kurosu), was published in Japan. In addition to providing additional information about the series characters and story, it includes images and details from Hino's storyboard. The fanbook has been licensed by Viz Media and was released on October 19, 2010.

A 94-page artbook, titled The Art of Vampire Knight: Matsuri Hino Illustrations (樋野まつりイラストレーションズ―ヴァンパイア騎士―), was released on July 5, 2010. The artwork included one original double page spread and a compilation of 111 previously released Vampire Knight color artworks. It was licensed by Viz Media and released on September 6, 2011.

A musical adaptation was announced and staged at the Hakuhinkan Theater in Tokyo from January 21–25, 2015. Another musical took place July 1–5, 2015.
