= Nei (Phantasy Star) =

Phantasy Star character

- Phantasy Star character
- Nei in Phantasy Star II
- First game: Phantasy Star II (1989)
- Designed by: Toru Yoshida

In-universe information
- Species: Numan

Nei (Japanese: ネイ) is a character in the 1989 video game Phantasy Star II. She is a companion to the protagonist Rolf, who joins him early in the game. She was created through the combination of DNA from humans and creatures called "bio-monsters", and she is linked with another of her kind called Neifirst. She was designed by Toru Yoshida, who gave her feline features early in development before scrapping them. She also served as the basis for the character Rika in Phantasy Star IV. She also stars in a text adventure based on Phantasy Star II.

She has received generally positive reception, particularly due to the impact of her death in Phantasy Star II. It was regarded as a particularly shocking death due to her significance to the plot, with critics finding it unprecedented that such an important character be killed off at the time. The circumstances of Nei's life have also contributed to the impact behind her death. Her death has been compared to the death of Aerith Gainsborough in Final Fantasy VII, with some critics believing that Nei's death was more impactful.

== Concept and design ==
Nei was designed by Toru Yoshida. She has pointy ears and wears a purple leotard. Early sketches show her with more feline features. She was originally going to have a tail, though Yoshida noted that he was unsure whether to keep it since her battle sprite did not have a tail. Despite the battle graphics designers gave him the okay, he ultimately chose to remove the tail. He remarked that Nei was the closest character to him in the game. She is a mutant girl, having been created using human and "bio-monster" genes", the latter which caused her to age from a child into a woman over the span of months. Yuji Naka noted how shocking her death was for players, stating that they received criticism from players over it. He felt that it would be better to handle it this way due to thinking the story needed more rhythm, adding that he understood why the players were so upset after playing Final Fantasy VII. Nei's design was considered for use in Phantasy Star IV for Rika by Yoshida, but the staff members, including Rieko Kodama, were reticent to accept that idea. They managed to work things out, and Rika was given similar ears to Nei's.

== Appearances ==
She is a major character in Phantasy Star II, being rescued by Rolf while escaping from people who wish her harm, who form a sibling relationship. Months later, her and Rolf, accompanied by other allies, visit a Biosystems Lab as part of an investigation, and later Climate Control, the latter where they discover a fellow Numan called Neifirst, who reveals that her and Nei have the same origin, and that she despises humans. Nei and Neifirst do battle, but the former is ultimately defeated and fatally wounded, imploring Rolf and the others to not allow scientists to make the same mistakes they did when they made her before dying. Rolf and the others go on to successfully defeat and kill Neifirst. Despite people being able to be revived from death, attempts to revive Nei are futile due to her not being human. In the remake, Phantasy Star Generation: 2, Nei is able to be revived through a lengthy process. She also appears in a Phantasy Star text adventure, which takes place before the events of Phantasy Star II.

In Phantasy Star IV, the character Rika was designed to be a successor to Nei.

== Reception ==
Nei received generally positive reception, noted by Phantasy Star II character designer Toru Yoshida as having been more popular among Japanese players than they expected. IT Media staff noted that her popularity continued years after Phantasy Star II. Anime News Network writer Jean-Karlo Lemus spoke of being "very sweet on Nei" due to her design and "heart-wrenching" story. Destructoid writer Leigh Alexander felt that the surprise of her death was a rarity at the time of Phantasy Star II, stating that her death created personal meaning for players in saving the world. She felt that it was more realistic for a group of people to fight to save the world for Nei's sake instead of for the sake of humanity. Kotaku staff remarked how nostalgic it was to see the Phantasy Star IV character Rika, who was "essentially Nei's descendant", due to how much they "cared about and missed" Nei. Despite not being the first time Shaun Musgrave of Touch Arcade saw a party member die in a role-playing game, Nei's was the first time it hurt, citing the fact that she spent so much time in the party and was so useful for this. He felt her sacrifice had the "most profound personal effect" on the game's story due to how unexpected it was and how empty it felt to fight without her in his team. He also discussed how the game handles the idea of reviving her, appreciating that it provided the in-universe reason of her not being human for why she can't be revived where others could.

Nei's death was compared to the death of Aerith Gainsborough from Final Fantasy VII, calling it "similarly shocking" and a "huge and upsetting surprise". Sega-16 writer Ken Horowitz felt that, despite Square Soft being able to make a more "engaging" death for Aerith thanks to VII's CD-ROM format, Nei's death was just as shocking for players. He stated that, while it was not the first main character to be killed in a game, it was the first instance in a console role-playing game in "such a dramatic fashion", remarking how it helped make the quest a "personal affair" for the main cast. Reactor Mag writer Peter Tieryas considered Nei's death more shocking to him than Aerith's, noting that before Phantasy Star II, characters were generally archetypes from fantasy, but Nei was a particular example from Phantasy Star II who defied this. He discussed how essential she was in combat due to how strong she was, speaking of how sad and furious he was when she was killed. He felt angry at the people who created Neifirst, furious at himself for not being able to save Nei, and confused about whether his actions were for the greater good.
