= Landale =

Landale is a name derived from the Old French word launde, which means "forest glade". Spelling variations include Lansdale, Landall, Landell, and Landells. It is also the name of a very small clan in Scotland north of Edinburgh.

== Landale ==
- David Landale (1868–1935), British-Hong Kong politician
  - D. F. Landale (1905–1970), British-Hong Kong politician, son of David Landale
- James Landale (born 1969), BBC journalist
- Jock Landale (born 1995), Australian basketball player
- Robert Landale (1832–1903), Australian politician
- Stenhard Landale (1905–1977), British businessman

== Lansdale ==
- Edward Lansdale (1908–1987), United States Air Force officer
- Joe R. Lansdale (born 1951), American writer
- John Lansdale Jr., (1912–2003), United States Army officer involved with the Manhattan Project
- Kasey Lansdale, American singer-songwriter
- Philip Lansdale (1858–1899), United States Navy officer
- Thomas Lancaster Lansdale (1748–1803), American member of the Society of the Cincinnati

== Landell ==
- Ethan Ebanks-Landell (born 1992), English footballer
- Ricky Landell (born 1982), American professional wrestler
- Roberto Landell de Moura (1861–1928), Brazilian priest and inventor

== Landells ==
- Ebenezer Landells (1808–1860), British engraver and illustrator
- Jack Landells (1904–1986), English footballer
- Suzie Landells (born 1964), Australian swimmer

== Fictional characters ==
In the Phantasy Star series, Landale may refer to:

- Waizz Landale, founder of the Landale royal dynasty, who united the lands of Palma together under his rule
- Alis Landale (born AW 326), Waizz's descendant, the heroine in Phantasy Star
- Aures Landale, Alis's father and king of Palma, who died suddenly shortly after Alis's birth
- Nero Landale (born AW 324), Alis's older brother, whose murder prompts Alis to set out on her quest
- Rolf Landale (born AW 1263), Alis's descendant, the main character and protagonist in Phantasy Star II
- The Landale, a raider warship commanded by the space pirate Tyler in Phantasy Star II; in Phantasy Star IV, it is recovered by Chaz's party and used for interplanetary travel
