= Skies of Arcadia =

2000 video game

- North American Dreamcast cover art
- Developer: Overworks
- Publisher: Sega
- Directors: Atsushi Seimiya; Shuntaro Tanaka
- Producer: Rieko Kodama
- Programmer: Tetsuichiro Hirose
- Writer: Shuntaro Tanaka
- Composers: Yutaka Minobe; Tatsuyuki Maeda
- Platforms: Dreamcast; GameCube
- Release: Dreamcast: JP: October 5, 2000; NA: November 14, 2000; EU: April 27, 2001; GameCube: JP: December 26, 2002; NA: January 28, 2003; EU: May 23, 2003; AU: June 6, 2003
- Genre: Role-playing
- Mode: Single-player

Skies of Arcadia (Note: Known in Japan as Eternal Arcadia (エターナルアルカディア, Etānaru Arukadia)) is a 2000 role-playing video game developed by Overworks and published by Sega for the Dreamcast. Players control Vyse, a young air pirate, and his friends as they attempt to stop the Valuan Empire from reviving ancient weapons with the potential to destroy the world.

Skies of Arcadia uses traditional Japanese role-playing game systems such as turn-based battles and experience points, but puts greater focus on exploration, with the player flying an airship in 3D space. The development team included staff who had contributed to the Panzer Dragoon, Phantasy Star, Sonic the Hedgehog and Sakura Wars series.

Skies of Arcadia received acclaim and is frequently regarded as one of the best Dreamcast games, although it underperformed commercially. A port for the GameCube, Skies of Arcadia Legends, (Note: Known in Japan as Eternal Arcadia Legends (エターナルアルカディア レジェンド, Etānaru Arukadia Rejendo)) was released in 2002. Skies of Arcadia has been named one of the greatest games by multiple publications. It was included in the 2010 book 1001 Video Games You Must Play Before You Die.

== Gameplay ==
Skies of Arcadia is a role-playing video game (RPG) with an emphasis on world exploration. Gameplay is similar to early 3D Final Fantasy and Dragon Quest games; the player engages enemies in turn-based battles to earn experience points, making their characters stronger. The overworld is divided into six regions, traversed by flying airships in 3D space; "Discoveries," hidden locations, reward the player with extra benefits. The world map starts out blank, and it is up to the player to chart the map through exploration. The player may also recruit characters they encounter in exploration, allowing them to be placed on the ship or base's staff, adding extra benefits to exploration or battle.

When docked on landmasses or warships, exploration occurs on foot. There, gameplay alternates between exploring cities and progressing through the dungeons. Cities are visited to buy equipment to make characters stronger, and interact with non-playable characters to progress the story. The dungeons exist in the format of a maze, with the player navigating the characters through it to obtain beneficial items in treasure chests while taking on enemies in random battles. Getting through the end of the maze generally culminates in a last boss battle to be won prior to exiting. The battle system involves managing "Spirit Points," "Magic Points," and a multi-colored "Moon Stone" system.

== Plot ==
=== Setting ===
The game takes place in the fictional world referred to as Arcadia, where six civilizations coexist on floating continents orbited by six moons of different colors. Thousands of years prior, the civilizations, one of which existed for each moon, developed technologically to the point where each created a Gigas, a colossal living weapon of mass destruction, controlled by a Moon Crystal. Using the Gigas, the civilizations warred with one another, threatening the extinction of humanity. The most advanced, the Silver Civilization, used their Gigas to summon the Rains of Destruction, which pulled meteors from the orbiting moons and crashed them down onto the planet's surface. The catastrophic destruction stopped the rampage of the Gigas, as well as nearly destroying the other five civilizations, thus ending the war. A seal was placed on the Silver Gigas to prevent it from being used again, and the Moon Crystals were hidden away, while each civilization worked on rebuilding itself.

==== Characters ====
The player primarily controls Vyse, as part of a party of up to four characters. The other two main characters, Aika and Fina, are mandatory party members for most of the game. The final spot in the group is filled by one of three other playable characters—Drachma, Gilder and Enrique—dictated either by story events, or the player's choice. An additional twenty-two minor characters are recruitable to fill various roles on Vyse's airship, though they remain there, and do not follow Vyse's party.

=== Story ===
Vyse and Aika are members of the Blue Rogues, a faction of Robin Hood-minded air pirates gathered together to resist the militant and tyrannical Valuan Empire. Led by Empress Teodora, the empire seeks the Moon Crystals to reawaken the Gigas and take over the world. Teodora directs the Valuan Armada, a fleet of warships led by admirals Galcian and Ramirez, to find them. Upon the Silver Civilization learning of this plan, they send Fina to find the Moon Crystals first. She is captured by the Armada, but saved by Vyse and Aika, who, with mutual enemies, agree to help her mission.

Hitching a ride with an old fisherman, Drachma, and his ship (the Little Jack, named for his son), the trio recover the Red Moon Crystal from a temple in the desert nation of Nasr and the Green Moon Crystal high above Ixa'taka, a continent of lush forests, while foiling Valuan operations. When Drachma's ship is damaged in a Valuan attack, Vyse is stranded on the small Crescent Island, where he uncovers letters and a map left behind by another pirate seeking treasure. Vyse is found by a fellow Blue Rogue, Gilder, who takes him aboard to search for his friends. Aika and Fina end up in the care of another Blue Rogue, Clara, who takes them to Nasr to help search for Vyse. Aika and Fina find out about the same treasure Vyse learned of, and the three reunite, but are captured by Ramirez and brought to the Valuans' prison fortress. By enlisting the Valuan prince Enrique, who has lost patience with his government's tyranny, and stealing a powerful Valuan warship, the Delphinus, the Blue Rogues escape. Vyse brings everyone back to Crescent Island, where he establishes a base of operations for his crew.

The party recovers the Blue Moon Crystal from the eastern Oriental land of Yafutoma and the Purple Moon Crystal from the southern glacial content of Glacia. After obtaining the Yellow Moon Crystal from the Valuan continent, they retrieve Fina's captured ship, which she needs to bring the Moon Crystals to the Silver Civilization in an immense shrine that orbits Arcadia. Ramirez's fleet assaults the Blue Rogues and he steals their Moon Crystals. Vyse, Aika, Fina and Gilder travel to the Great Silver Shrine in orbit to confer with the elders; they are followed by Galcian and Ramirez, who assassinate the leader of the Silvite elders and extract the final Moon Crystal from his body.

Galcian and Ramirez use the Moon Crystals to raise the lost Silver continent of Soltis and break the seal on the Silver Gigas. They use the Rains of Destruction to annihilate the Valuan capital, killing Empress Teodora and seizing control of the Valuan Armada in a bid to dominate the world. Vyse rallies a fleet of Blue Rogues, Yafutoman warships, and ships from other regions of the world to battle the Valuan Armada. The Delphinus crew disables the Hydra, Galcian's capital ship, and boards the ship and defeat Galcian, with assistance from Galcian's subordinate Belleza, who turns on him and kills them both.

Ramirez, who has retreated into Soltis, is enraged at Galcian's death, and prepares to use the Rains of Destruction to wipe out the Blue Rogues. He is stopped by the Silvites, who sacrifice their lives to take down the protective shield around Soltis. The party enters Soltis and battle Ramirez, who merges with the Silver Gigas, Zelos, allowing it to awaken. Returning to the Delphinus, Vyse and his crew do battle with Zelos and manage to defeat it. The party rushes to the outer deck, where a chunk of Zelos, merged with Ramirez and controlling him, slams onto the Delphinus' deck. They battle, resulting in Ramirez's death and the defeat of the Valuan Armada. Prince Enrique marries Princess Moegi of Yafutoma and becomes emperor of Valua. With a promise of benevolent rule, he and his wife oversee the reconstruction of the Valuan capital. Vyse and Aika inaugurate Fina as a Blue Rogue, and the three sail into the sunset.

== Development ==
Development began in 1999 under the code name Project Ares. The title was changed to Eternal Arcadia in 2000, retained for the Japanese release. The internal Sega development team, Overworks, consisted of development staff from Team Andromeda and the Phantasy Star teams. Producer Rieko Kodama had worked on Phantasy Star 1, 2 and 4, and the first two Sonic the Hedgehog games for the Sega Genesis, while scenario writer Shuntaro Tanaka had written the stories for the first two Sakura Wars RPGs. The soundtrack was composed by Tatsuyuki Maeda, who composed for Sonic 3 & Knuckles, and Yutaka Minobe. Expectations were high, as Team Andromeda's prior game, Panzer Dragoon Saga (1998), had received acclaim and the Dreamcast had few well-reviewed Japanese RPGs.

Development went smoothly, attributed to the increased power and easier architecture of the Dreamcast in comparison to the Sega Saturn. The team comprised around 20 people. They decided to make entering buildings in towns seamless, without loading, and to use an expressive anime art style to more clearly show facial expressions and emotions of characters, both of which they felt had been lacking from recent popular RPGs such as Final Fantasy VII and Final Fantasy VIII. Similarly, while the aforementioned games were focused on dark themes and complicated gameplay systems, Overworks strove to keep the game bright and cheerful, with simple gameplay mechanics that focused on exploring a large game world. The game was released across two of Sega's proprietary GD-ROM discs, to accommodate its size.

Development began for the Sega Saturn, with battles on land and the tops of trains. After production moved to the Dreamcast, the motif of traveling the skies was set, inspired by the Age of Discovery. At the time, Japanese role-playing video games portrayed mostly darker worlds, but Overworks was more interested in creating an optimistic protagonist who explored the world. They took care to portray Aika and Fina, Vyse's female friends, on equal footing with him, rather than being saved by him. The historical architecture and ancient civilizations are attributed to team member Shuntaro Tanaka, who majored in history at university and conceptualized the world and scenario, inspiring the "discovery" aspect.

The Japanese Dreamcast release date was set for September 14, 2000, but delayed to October 5, 2000, so the team could create a paid "trial version" for concurrent release. The release was promoted in Japan with posters and television commercials. During launch month, and spanning eight months total, Skies of Arcadia was adapted as an official manga in every issue of Magazine Z, supervised by the development team. A soundtrack was released on CD on the day of the game's release.

=== Localization ===
Eternal Arcadia was renamed Skies of Arcadia for its Western releases, which Sega felt better expressed the premise and story to Western audiences. It was localized by Chris Lucich and Klayton Vorlick. The two were given the freedom to change the content, though Sega of Japan held the right to veto their changes. While it follows the general plotline, much of the dialogue was entirely rewritten. The two did a rough translation of the entire game from Japanese to English, and then deleted the Japanese from their records, choosing to write the subsequent and final drafts without referencing the original text. Vorlick completely rewrote the dialogue for Enrique, Vigoro and Fina, while Lucich rewrote Gilder and Aika, and the two co-wrote for Vyse. Speech patterns expected to be annoying to Western audiences, such as the repetitive nature of Fina saying "mina-san" (みなさん, "everybody"), were removed, while more interesting speech patterns, quirks and jokes were given to other characters. The two were influenced by the work of Joss Whedon, adding dry, sarcastic responses that had been more straightforward in the original. Many side characters and weapons were renamed after members of the localization and quality assurance team.

Some more mature content was edited; the two scaled back on references to Aika being assaulted by Vigoro when captured by him, and of references to Ramirez obsessively talking about Galcian in later scenes. All traces of cigarettes are removed, shops serve Loqua juice instead of alcohol, and the female character Bellena's attire is altered to be less revealing. The localization was completed in four months, with 80- to 100-hour work weeks, on a script of over 2,000 pages. Skies of Arcadia was released in English in North America on November 14, 2000, and in English, German, French and Spanish in Europe on April 21, 2001.

=== Skies of Arcadia Legends port ===
In October 2001, shortly after Sega's announcement that it would abandon the Dreamcast to make software for other consoles, Sega announced that it would port Skies of Arcadia to GameCube and PlayStation 2. US developer Point of View Software was brought on to help with the conversion, though the original staff from Overworks continued to work on the game. Development was announced to begin in January 2002, with Sega initially aiming for a mid-2002 release. However, by April, Sega announced that the PS2 version would be delayed, and by May, rumors spread that it had been cancelled, though this was refuted by Sega. In August 2002, Sega announced that the PS2 version was cancelled in favor of focusing on the GameCube release, which was, as of October 2002, 80% complete. Skies of Arcadia Legends was released on the GameCube in Japan on December 26, 2002, in North America on January 28, 2003, and in Europe on May 23, 2003, with Infogrames distributing for the latter territory. A port for Windows was announced in early 2004, but never released.

Sega and Kodama have described Legends as a "director's cut". It uses a mix of the original game's code and code newly written for the GameCube. It features improvements such as slightly more detailed character models, a more stable frame rate, reduced loading times, new side quests and subplots, new hidden discoveries, and a "Wanted List" of new enemies to find. It also has fewer random encounters, and awards more experience points in battle to compensate. With the GameCube lacking the Dreamcast's VMU, some effects, such as Cupil's notifications, were moved to the television screen, while the "Pinta Quest" minigame was removed outright. With the GameCube being less readily connected to the internet, the downloadable content was implemented into the main game.

== Reception ==
Reception

Aggregate score
Aggregator	Score	
Aggregator	Dreamcast	GameCube
Metacritic	93/100	84/100

Review scores
Publication	Score	
Publication	Dreamcast	GameCube
CNET Gamecenter	9/10	N/A
Electronic Gaming Monthly	9.5/10, 9.5/10, 9/10	9/10, 9/10, 9.5/10
EP Daily	9/10	8.5/10
Eurogamer	9/10	8/10
Famitsu	9/10, 9/10, 8/10, 7/10	8/10, 8/10, 8/10, 8/10
Game Informer	9/10	9/10
GameRevolution	A−	B
GameSpot	9.2/10	7.5/10
GameSpy	9/10	4.5/5
IGN	9.2/10	8.5/10
Next Generation	4/5	N/A
Nintendo Power	N/A	4.5/5
RPGamer	10/10	N/A
RPGFan	(D.T.) 94% (4, 5) 93% (1, 3) 91%	(J.G.) 95% (K.C.) 93% (R.B.) 89%
Official Dreamcast Magazine UK	8/10	N/A

Skies of Arcadia received "universal acclaim", according to the review aggregator Metacritic. In Japan, Famitsu gave it 33 out of 40. GameFan gave Skies of Arcadia 99%, calling it "By far my favorite RPG of all time thanks to its great story, looks, and battle system. The game has absorbed my days and nights with swashbuckling adventures -- and that's all you can really ask for in the end, isn't it?" IGN praised it as "one of the most solid games visually on the Dreamcast ... There's so much to explore, so much character, and a great story that you don't mind being retold again." GameSpot said it met their expectations and that the visuals were "some of the most painstakingly detailed ever seen in a role-playing game". Edge wrote: "Gripping to the nines, extraordinary to behold, with rich character development and innumerable statistics, Skies of Arcadia is a wonderful experience, and bodes well for all 128-bit RPGs to come."

Jeff Lundrigan of NextGen wrote, "Despite the problems—which it shares with practically every other Japanese RPG—Skies of Arcadia is an impressive, thoroughly delightful game that no one should pass up." Four-Eyed Dragon of GamePro called Skies of Arcadia "a Dreamcast role-playing game worth playing to the very end. Despite some small blemishes, Skies of Arcadia won't disappoint during your flight through the role-playing skies." (Note: GamePro gave the Dreamcast version all four 4.5/5 scores for graphics, sound, control and fun factor.) Many critics noted that it was sometimes difficult to explore due to the number of random encounters. Neither version of Skies of Arcadia sold well.

Skies of Arcadia was a finalist for the "Best Dreamcast Game" and "Best Role-Playing Game" awards at GameSpot's Best and Worst of 2000 Awards, which went to NFL 2K1 and Chrono Cross. At the 4th Annual Interactive Achievement Awards, the Academy of Interactive Arts & Sciences nominated it in the "Character or Story Development", "Console Role-Playing", "Console Game of the Year" and "Game of the Year" categories; these went to Baldur's Gate II: Shadows of Amn, Final Fantasy IX, SSX and Diablo II. Skies of Arcadia was also nominated for "Best Console RPG" and "Best New Game Character" (Vyse) at The Electric Playground's Blister Awards 2000, which went to Valkyrie Profile and Ulala from Space Channel 5. The American game developer Tim Schafer of Double Fine said Skies of Arcadia and another Dreamcast game, Rayman 2: The Great Escape, were the main influences on his 2005 game Psychonauts: "You can see how if you mash those games together, you get Psychonauts."

=== GameCube port ===
Skies of Arcadia Legends received slightly less positive reviews. In Japan, Famitsu gave it a score of 32 out of 40. Fennec Fox of GamePro wrote that "there's no need to harp on the battles too much—they're the only blemish on what's otherwise the Dreamcast's (and now GameCube's) best RPG. The graphics are dated but effective, and the musician was obviously overdosing on 1930s adventure serials when composing the over-the-top score. The story, though, is the best part—Vyse and crew are the most extroverted RPG heroes ever, and there's none of that Final Fantasy-style self-abhorrence present. Get over the battles, and you'll find Skies dangerously playable." (Note: GamePro gave the GameCube version 4/5 for graphics, 5/5 for sound, and two 4.5/5 scores for control and fun factor.) GameZone gave it nine out of ten, writing, "The main problem with this game is that it feels a little dated, especially when you compare it to FFX or other games coming out shortly. Other than that it is a great game."

Many critics felt the graphics had not been substantially improved despite more powerful hardware and over two years passing from the Dreamcast's release. Expectations in graphics had changed drastically in between releases—while the Dreamcast release was frequently compared to the weaker original PlayStation and Final Fantasy VII, VIII and IX, by the time of the GameCube release, it was compared against the likes of the much more powerful PlayStation 2 and its games like Final Fantasy X and Xenosaga GameSpot named Skies of Arcadia the best GameCube game of January 2003.

=== Best-of lists ===
In 2007, Game Informer named Skies of Arcadia one of the top 10 Dreamcast games. In a 2017 retrospective from Metacritic on the highest-rated exclusive games (at time of release) per platform, Skies of Arcadia placed third for the Dreamcast, behind Soulcalibur and Jet Grind Radio. In 2023, Time Extension included it on their list of the best Japanese RPGs.

Skies of Arcadia was named one of the greatest games by Stuff in 2008, Jeux Video Network in 2009, Gaming Bolt in 2013, USA Today in 2022 and Sports Illustrated in 2023. Game Informer ranked it the 200th-greatest game in its 2009 list and the 300th-greatest in its 2018 list. It was included in the 2010 book 1001 Video Games You Must Play Before You Die.

== Legacy ==
=== Potential sequel ===
In addition to the cancelled PlayStation 2 and PC releases a sequel was considered by Sega in the early 2000s, but did not begin full production. The development team had shown interest in creating a sequel, or a portable iteration for the Game Boy Advance during the development of Legends for the GameCube, but neither materialized. In September 2002, after the completion of Legends, Skies of Arcadia producer Rieko Kodama stated that the team was still interested in creating a sequel, but that work had still not started on it, though had it started, she felt that the GameCube would have been the most likely platform for its release. In February 2003, Overworks president Noriyoshi Ohba announced that a Skies of Arcadia sequel had entered the planning stages. However, in a December 2004 interview, Kodama stated that while there had been plans for a sequel, the project was put on hold indefinitely while many members of the team were pulled into working on Sakura Wars: So Long, My Love. In 2020, the staff member Kenji Hiruta said he wanted develop Skies of Arcadia 2.

=== Potential remaster ===
In 2010, Sega began releasing HD remasters of Dreamcast games on PlayStation Network and Xbox Live for the PlayStation 3 and Xbox 360, including Sonic Adventure, Crazy Taxi, Sonic Adventure 2 and Jet Set Radio. In 2012, the Sega brand manager Ben Harborne said that remasters of Skies of Arcadia and Shenmue were likely to be released as they were the most frequently requested games. Sega renewed the Skies of Arcadia trademark later that year, but it was not rereleased.

=== In other media ===
Skies of Arcadia characters have appeared in Sega properties. Multiple characters appeared in Sega's 2008 video game Valkyria Chronicles, another title directed by Shuntaro Tanaka. "Vyse Inglebard" and "Aika Thompson" appear as optional members of Squad 7 and are listed on each other's "Like" list. Fina also appears as one of several identical sisters who serve as the squad's unplayable medics. The three also appeared in the Japan-only Valkyria Chronicles III in 2011 as well. Vyse and Fina made minor cameos in some of the accompanying Valkyria Chronicles anime as well. Outside of the Valkyria games, Vyse has also made some appearances in some Sonic the Hedgehog related media. He is a playable character in 2012 Sega racing game Sonic & All-Stars Racing Transformed, which also features a racetrack based on Skies of Arcadia, where the participants must drive and fly through the Blue Rogue's home-base while eluding attacks from the Valuan Empire. Vyse also appears in the Sonic the Hedgehog comic book adaptation of Transformed featured in Sonic Universe #45, and again in the Sonic comics for the "World Unite" Sega character crossover story arc.
