= Phantasy Star Collection =

Video game compilation

- Japanese box art
- Developers: Sega (SS); Digital Eclipse (GBA)
- Publisher: Sega: NA: THQ (GBA)
- Directors: Akinori Nishiyama; Rieko Kodama
- Producer: Yuji Naka
- Series: Phantasy Star
- Platforms: Sega Saturn, Game Boy Advance, PlayStation 2
- Release: Sega Saturn: JP: February 4, 1998; Game Boy Advance: NA: November 25, 2002; EU: March 7, 2003; PlayStation 2: JP: March 27, 2008
- Genre: Role-playing
- Mode: Single-player

Phantasy Star Collection (Note: Japanese: ファンタシースターコレクション, Hepburn: Fantashī Sutā Korekushon) is a compilation of Phantasy Star video games. When released for the Sega Saturn in Japan in 1998, it featured the first four games in the series, whereas the Game Boy Advance version, released in 2002 in North America and in 2003 in Europe, features the first three. The North American and European versions were produced by Digital Eclipse. The Saturn version was later ported to the PlayStation 2 (as Sega Ages 2500 Series Vol. 32: Phantasy Star Complete Collection) in Japan with more games added.

The compilation features ports of the original Phantasy Star games. They are virtually identical to their original versions, as opposed to enhanced remakes. Gameplay has not been altered in each of the collections, but additional options in the Saturn and PlayStation 2 versions can alter the pace and difficulty of the games significantly.

== Gameplay ==
Each game features overworld maps and separate dungeon areas, both with random encounters. Players control parties of characters, battling enemies and earning experience points to grow stronger. Certain characters can use different magic spells and techniques during and outside of battle. Phantasy Star's dungeons differ from the rest because they are in first-person, while the rest of the games use a top-down style.

== Plot ==
Although each game in the collections feature different characters and stories, they take place in the Algol planetary system, specifically on the planets Palma, Motavia, and Dezolis. In the four games, there exists a Dark Force, a common antagonist that threatens the planetary system. The games also make small references to each other, such as the idolation of Alis in Phantasy Star IV.

== Development ==
Phantasy Star II's top-down style travel is shown as Rolf and Nei move through a town.

Its first incarnation was released in 1998 on the Sega Saturn, as part of Sega's Sega Ages series of classics that included Space Harrier, Out Run, After Burner, and Fantasy Zone. Although the first three games listed emerged in the West as a single compilation, Phantasy Star Collection was developed after publisher support for the Saturn had virtually disappeared, and remains a Japan only title. It includes what are considered the main entries in the series, with select enhancements such as the option of playing the games in katakana or hiragana in the first entry of the series (they originally were katakana only), an optional walking speed increase in Phantasy Star II and Phantasy Star III, and four save slots for Phantasy Star III (enabling players to have a slot for each of the four possible third generation protagonists). Due to the native resolution of the Mark III, the original Phantasy Star is played in a frame. The game also has bonus content in the form of exclusive arranged music, art galleries, and video clips of the Japanese commercials for the original games.

The Game Boy Advance version, produced by Digital Eclipse, emerged in 2002. Unlike the Sega Saturn release, Phantasy Star IV: The End of the Millennium is not included. The video games themselves were also altered in order to function adequately on the Game Boy Advance's resolution. The GBA version has a reduced number of save slots available for Phantasy Star and Phantasy Star II, and does not include any extras.

The PlayStation 2 version, part of Sega's PS2 line of Sega Ages titles, is significantly different from the Sega Saturn version. Renamed Phantasy Star Complete Collection, this version includes the Phantasy Star II Text Adventures series, released exclusively to the Sega Meganet network, with the first of the eight games (the one following the adventures of Rolf) available to be played without unlocking. It also includes the two Game Gear titles of the series, Phantasy Star Gaiden and Phantasy Star Adventure. Unlike the GBA version, it includes all four titles of the original series. While, unlike the Sega Ages titles Phantasy Star Generation 1 and Phantasy Star Generation 2, the games are mainly untouched, several options that are not available in the Sega Saturn version are included. These options can drastically alter the games, both visually (with graphical options ranging from changing resolution, interlacing, smoothness and scanlines) and in gameplay. The changes in gameplay can alter the speed of the characters (much like the option available for Phantasy Star II and Phantasy Star III in the Saturn version, but available to all games) and also the difficulty, by changing how much money and experience the player gets from fights, which can drastically reduce the time necessary to complete the games. There are also options to change the type of machine and localization of the games, making it possible to play them in their Japanese version as well as their English localized counterparts. This compilation was released on PlayStation Network for the PlayStation 3 in 2012.

== Reception ==
Reception

Aggregate scores
Aggregator	Score	
Aggregator	GBA	Saturn
GameRankings	76%	N/A
Metacritic	76/100	N/A

Review scores
Publication	Score	
Publication	GBA	Saturn
Edge	6/10	N/A
Electronic Gaming Monthly	9/10, 8/10, 7.5/10	N/A
Eurogamer	6/10	N/A
Game Informer	8/10	N/A
GamePro	4/5	N/A
GameSpot	8.6/10	7/10
GameSpy	3.5/5	N/A
GameZone	9/10	N/A
IGN	6/10	N/A

The Game Boy Advance version received "generally favorable reviews" according to the review aggregation website Metacritic. Critics noted that although said handheld version was outdated, it still held up with its innovations to the genre. They praised its uniqueness upon their original release as well as the fact that all three games come on one cartridge. Tim Tracy of GameSpot noted that "Longtime fans of the series will definitely be pleased with the results, and it's worth mentioning that all three of these games originally retailed for about $70 each." It was a runner-up for GameSpot's annual "Best Role-Playing Game on Game Boy Advance" award, which went to Tactics Ogre: The Knight of Lodis.

Tracy criticized the omission of Phantasy Star IV, calling it possibly the best out of them, or "better than III". Adam Tierney of IGN complained that Digital Eclipse did not do anything for the ports, mentioning the "tinny" music, "grammatical errors", and "huge crash bugs".
