= Alis Landale =

Phantasy Star protaginist

- Phantasy Star character
- Concept art of Alis Landale
- First game: Phantasy Star (1987)
- Designed by: Rieko Kodama
- Voiced by: Sumi Shimamoto

Alis Landale, also known as Arisa (Japanese: アリサ), is the protagonist of the 1987 video game Phantasy Star. In this game, she seeks vengeance after the death of her assassinated brother while assuming his duties. She appears in various other Phantasy Star video games in different roles in their stories. She was designed by Rieko Kodama, who intended to make a game that did things that were unusual at the time, such as having a female protagonist.

She has been generally well received, noted as being the first female protagonist in a Japanese role-playing game. She also received praise from critics for her design, which was complimented for not being oversexualized.

== Concept and creation ==
Despite being known as Alisa in Japanese, her name was changed to Alis due to the game only allowing four characters inputted for her name. Designer Rieko Kodama was responsible for the creation of Alis' design, as well as designing the cut-ins for Alis. In an interview, Kodama discussed various things they wanted to do with Phantasy Star that hadn't been done before in a game, including a female lead character, thinking it would be an interesting change. She also wanted to ensure that her female characters did not fall into "male fantasy" stereotypes. Kodama designed her to be a mixture of her femininity with her "strength and forward-thinking nature". Her design went through 10 different iterations before a final design was conceived. Another character, Noah, was made androgynous due to Kodama being unsure if she would need to make Alis more masculine to make her the protagonist, with the mindset that Noah could be made to be a woman. Her full name was created by Kodama after receiving pressure from designer Yasushi Yamaguchi while he was working on a spinoff manga. She is voiced by Sumi Shimamoto in Phantasy Star Online 2.

== Appearances ==
Alis, as the protagonist of the video game Phantasy Star, embarks on a quest for vengeance after seeing her brother assassinated. She also takes on his quest following his death. She appears briefly in the sequel, Phantasy Star II, where she is seen in a recurring nightmare by protagonist Rolf. In the Game Gear video game Phantasy Star Gaiden, a colony is named after her called Alisaland. She also appears personally, assisting the protagonist through the game after having been in cryogenic sleep. Phantasy Star IV: The End of the Millennium depicts Alis' spirit returning, while also clarifying that Alis' quest in Phantasy Star was the product of a curse that reoccurs every 1000 years.

Alis appears in a manga created by Yasushi Yamaguchi, which takes place after the events of the original Phantasy Star, depicting her and Noah having their ship sabotaged by Lassic's servants.

== Reception ==
Alis has received positive reception, described as a "beloved and groundbreaking female protagonist" by Destructoid writer Chris Moyse and an icon by RPGFan writer Nilson Carroll. Old!Gamer staff commented on how unusual a character like Alis was, noting how she had an ordinary design for a woman and her body covered in clothes and armor. They felt that such protagonists were uncommon even today. Writer Kurt Kalata, in A Guide to Japanese Role-Playing Games, also discussed how unusual a character she was, comparing her to female characters at the time, whom he described as either sexualized or secondary while describing Alis' outfit as "practical". Polygon writer Jeremy Parish stated that she was "cut from the cloth of the mid ’80s warrior-woman anime trend", citing works like Maris the Chojo and Leda: The Fantastic Adventure of Yohko as examples.

Game Informer writer Kimberley Wallace credited her for "[paving] the way for many leading ladies who didn't need saving and had their own motivations". Games TM staff appreciated that her character was not an "anime cliche" and that she did not act like a "pouty-lipped sexpot", which they felt contributed significantly to her being a strong female video game character. The protagonist of Robert Boyd's Cosmic Star Heroine, Alyssa, took from various Phantasy Star characters' names, including Alis. Boyd regarded Alis as one of the best heroines in Japanese role-playing games (JRPG), stating he felt that way because she was the first female lead in JRPGs. Hardcore Gaming 101 staff similarly noted her as the first lead female character in a JRPG, commenting on her outfit, which they noted was "surprisingly modest" unlike typical fantasy armor. RPGamer writer Sam Wachter appreciated being able to play as a female protagonist, saying that she was the "original heroine for many of us who grew up in the early 90s" and that "she gave us hope that there would be more fantastic leading ladies in the future". Despite moving onto other JRPGs heroines as time passed, she stated she never forgot her.
