= Phantasy Star III =

1990 video game

Phantasy Star III: Generations of Doom
- North American box art
- Developer: Sega
- Publisher: Sega
- Director: Hiroto Saeki
- Producer: Kazunari Tsukamoto
- Designer: Hirondo Saiki
- Artist: Saru Miya
- Writers: Hiroto Saeki; Yang Watt
- Composer: Izuho Numata
- Series: Phantasy Star
- Platform: Sega Genesis
- Release: JP: April 21, 1990; NA: June 1991; EU: October 1991
- Genre: Role-playing
- Mode: Single-player

Phantasy Star III: Generations of Doom, known in Japan as Successors of Time: Phantasy Star III, (Note: Japanese: 時の継承者 ファンタシースターIII, Hepburn: Toki no Keishōsha: Phantasy Star III) is a 1990 role-playing video game developed and published by Sega for the Sega Genesis. The third main installment in the Phantasy Star series, it is the first title to not be developed with the involvement of series co-creator Yuji Naka. The game's plot spans three generations, following the journey of the prince Rhys and his descendants as they attempt to resolve an escalating conflict between two warring factions. Much of the gameplay elements from its predecessors, derived from traditional Japanese role-playing game tropes such as random encounters, are either retained or altered with additional changes such as an icon-based menuing system.

After the completion of Phantasy Star II (1989), most of its development staff went on to work on Sonic the Hedgehog (1991), leading to a new team being formed for Phantasy Star III composed of people who had never previously worked on role-playing games. Assisted by series veteran Rieko Kodama in its planning stages, the team decided to implement branching narrative paths as a way to differentiate the game from the crowded market of the time. However, due to issues stemming from data storage constraints, many concepts such as parts of the narrative needed to be cut in order to fully realize the game's features.

Upon release, the game garnered critical acclaim for its multi-generational plot and alternative endings. Since then, upon further retrospective evaluation, it has additionally been criticized for its divergences from prior Phantasy Star titles and is now considered as the black sheep of the series because of this.

== Gameplay ==
Phantasy Star III mostly follows the traditional turn-based role-playing game formula seen throughout the series, with the exploration of several 2-D worlds, character recruitment, and random enemy encounters using a turn-based battle system. Unlike previous games, the "technique" magic system plays a somewhat diminished role in combat. New features in the combat system include the auto-battle feature and the icon-based menu system.

The feature that mostly separates Phantasy Star III, however, is that the story spans three generations of characters. At critical points throughout the game, the main character is given the option of marrying one of two women he has encountered during his travels. This choice determines the new main character of the next generation—the child (or children) of the previous lead. The choice also affects the gameplay, as the main character may be Orakian or a mix of Layan and Orakian, which differ in their ability to use techniques and their level of proficiency with them. Two paths in the second generation in turn lead to four paths in the third and final generation, and depending on which of the four main characters is played, the ending will vary.

== Plot ==
A thousand years before the start of the game, two factions — one led by the swordsman Orakio, the other by the sorceress Laya — were engaged in a bitter conflict. An attempt at peace was made when the two leaders met for an armistice, but soon afterwards they both mysteriously vanished. This placed the two factions in a precarious situation, as each blamed the other for their leader's disappearance. All communication between the Orakians and Layans was suspended, travel between their respective worlds was prohibited, and the two groups teetered on the brink of war.

Players take control of Rhys, Crown Prince of the Orakian kingdom of Landen, on the day of his wedding to Maia, a mysterious amnesiac who washed up on Landen's shore two months earlier.

During the ceremony, a dragon (identified as a Layan) suddenly appears and snatches Maia, in what seems to be an overt escalation of the Layan-Orakian conflict. During Rhys's search for Maia, he recruits various characters to his cause. Ultimately, it is revealed that Maia herself is Layan, Princess of the kingdom of Cille, and that her kidnapping was actually a rescue attempt by her people, who believed she had been stolen from them by the "hostile" Orakians.

It is later revealed in-game that both factions are the descendants of survivors from planet Palm of the Algo System — which was destroyed during the events of the previous game — and that their different kingdoms are sections of a massive colonization-spaceship.

After three generations, both factions mix, and their descendants discover that all the conflicts among the different kingdoms were caused by the Dark Force, the main antagonist of the previous games, which is defeated in a final decisive battle that actually takes place 1,000 years after the events from the next game in the series.

== Development ==
The game was developed and published by Sega for the Sega Genesis, where it first released in Japan in April 1990, and in North America in June 1991. Producer Kazunari Tsukamoto described Phantasy Star III as being similar to a collection of side stories when compared to the connected narrative of its predecessor and the sequel Phantasy Star IV: The End of the Millennium. This and its altered graphic style was due to the team being different from earlier Phantasy Star entries. Hirondo Saiki acted as game designer. The game's multiple endings proved difficult to implement due to data storage limitations. The branching narrative and gameplay paths were added to set the game apart from other role-playing games (RPGs) due to the crowded market at the time. The game was the first time designers and programmers came together as a team rather than separate units, but Saiki became fatigued during development of the game's later stages due to being sole designer. In order to realise the planned scale of the world, several portions of the narrative needed to be cut. Character designs and the cover art were done by Saru Miya, who remembered experiencing great hardships with the project, describing it as something which she considered a "home-spun" project. The music for Phantasy Star III was composed by Izuho Numata, who had only been at Sega for two years. She later claimed that the project was challenging due to her lack of experience with composing for RPGs. Numata revealed that the original plan was to have the music change depending on who was in the party. As that took up too much memory, they ended up with the music changing based on how many total members were in the party.

== Reception ==
=== Contemporary ===
Contemporary reception

Review scores
Publication	Score
Computer Gaming World	Positive
Consoles +	94%
Dragon	4/5
Electronic Gaming Monthly	32/40
Player One	97%
MegaTech	89%
Sega Power	93%

Phantasy Star III received positive reviews upon release. Praise was given to Phantasy Star III for its unique "generational" gameplay and characters.

Computer Gaming World in 1991 praised the game's graphics and its "plenty of plot twists and turns." The magazine concluded that it was "a rewarding epic tale which should be told on every Genesis system." The game was reviewed that year in Dragon #176 by Hartley, Patricia, and Kirk Lesser in "The Role of Computers" column. The reviewers gave the game 4 out of 5 stars. They noted that they "didn't like it as much as Phantasy Star II" but still praised Phantasy Star III for being "creative in many ways," including the choices of whom to marry, the different possible endings, and the "longer play life" that this allows. Electronic Gaming Monthly gave Phantasy Star III one 7, two 8s, and one 9, with reviewer Martin Alessi stating that the game "blows away the previous games" in the series.

The only downside according to MegaTech magazine was that "it costs a massive £50!"

=== Retrospective ===
Retrospective reception

Aggregate score
Aggregator	Score
GameRankings	68%

Review scores
Publication	Score
AllGame	3.5/5
RPGFan	82%

Retrospectively, it maintains above average ratings, with an overall score of 68% on the aggregate site GameRankings based on retrospective reviews published online in the 2000s. Some critics thought it was just too "different" in style from its peers. Critics cite the only subtle differences between the endings, lower quality battle animations, and the fact that it did not resolve the perceived cliffhanger ending of Phantasy Star II.

Mega placed the game at #12 in their Top Mega Drive Games of All Time list in 1992. Nintendo Power named it the series' "lackluster third installment" in 2009 and noted that series co-creator Rieko Kodama did not work on it.

The game's icon-based menu system inspired a similar menu system in 1991's Shining in the Darkness.
