= Phantasy Star Nova =

2014 video game

- Japanese game cover
- Developer: tri-Ace
- Publisher: Sega
- Producers: Hiroyuki Tamura; Yasuyuki Tsuzuki; Satoshi Sakai
- Composer: Motoi Sakuraba
- Series: Phantasy Star
- Platform: PlayStation Vita
- Release: JP: November 27, 2014; AS: March 26, 2015
- Genre: Action role-playing game
- Mode: Single-player

Phantasy Star Nova (ファンタシースター ノヴァ) is a video game for the PlayStation Vita developed by tri-Ace as an installment of the Phantasy Star game series. It was released on November 27, 2014 in Japan, while a Chinese-language version was released throughout Asia on March 26, 2015.

== Development ==
The game was announced by Sega at the SCEJA Press Conference in September 2013 prior to the Tokyo Game Show. The game was described as having a strong storyline, and emphasis on the single player mode. Over 200 people, including 70 main staff, were involved in the development of the game. The game was produced by Yasuyuki Tsuzuki of Sega and Hiroyuki Tamura of tri-Ace, and the in-game music was composed by Motoi Sakuraba. The game is compatible with the PlayStation Vita TV.

In August 2014, Sega announced that a version localized in Chinese was also being developed. It was released throughout Asia on March 26, 2015.

== Gameplay ==
In-game combat screenshot, demonstrating the gameplay layout

The game is multiplayer compatible, with up to four players playing simultaneously in co-operation with one another through local ad-hoc WiFi play. Players are able to fight giant monsters. Costumes can be damaged, where they will show signs of tearing and falling apart. Certain enemies from Phantasy Star Online 2 will make reappearances in the game. Photon Arts and Technics from earlier games in the series will not be usable, as a result of certain plot mechanisms. The single-player story is progressed through individual missions, with the story expanded as more missions are completed. The player is able to fully customize the name and appearance of the playable character, using the same character creation mechanism used in Phantasy Star Online 2.

The game features a selection of various class types with differing combat styles, such as the Hunter class specialising in short-ranged attacks with high HP and defense, the Ranger class intended for long-range combat, the Force class which utilises ranged technique attacks which include fire, ice and healing, and the Buster class with all-rounded attributes and short-ranged attacks. The player is able to craft weapons through the procurement of raw materials; weapons cannot be obtained via item drops, however. Hunter class players are able to utilise swords and partisans, whilst Force class players can use rods. Piles, a new type of anchor shooting weapon, has also been introduced; these weapons create weak points on enemies.

The player is also able to capture the large Gigantes enemies, which can then be summoned to fight against enemies during battle.

== Setting ==
As part of the Arks Special Planetary Exploration Group Alter, the player is on a journey to return alive from Machia, a chaotic planet where photons have no effect, after the Delta Valiant warship crashes on Machia with 1,000 crew on board. The planet also happens to be home to the Gigantes, who are hostile foes. On the planet exists another source of energy known as Gran, and by substituting it as an energy source in place of photons, technology such as weapons can be used.

=== Characters ===
The story revolves around three main characters:

- Lutina, an 18-year-old Human female NPC and partner of the protagonist, belonging to the Force class. Voiced by Maaya Uchida.
- Sail, an 18-year-old Human male NPC of the Hunter class. Voiced by Yoshitsugu Matsuoka.
- Fildia, a 28-year-old Human female NPC of the Hunter class, who is the temporary captain of the Delta Valiant. Voiced by Miyuki Sawashiro.
- Izuna, a Newman female NPC of the Ranger class. Voiced by Ai Kayano.
- Magnus, the captain of Delta Valiant, he was fatally wounded during the first battle. He passed his authority to Fildia and died.
- Raven, a Newman male NPC, he is the chief of the science team and the chief mate of Delta Valiant. Voiced by Daisuke Namikawa.
- Sharon, a Cast female NPC of the Force class. She is a key member of the science team. Voiced by Kanae Itou.
- Olkus, a Human male NPC of the Ranger class. He is the leader and drill instructor of the combat team. Voiced by Akio Otsuka.
- Lydia, a Human female NPC. She is the physician of the ship and provisional operator. Voiced by Misato Fukuen.
- Yomi, a Newman male NPC of the Hunter class. The weapon technician. Voiced by Yuuki Kaji.
- Kisala, a Human female NPC. The main operator of Delta Valiant. Voiced by Chiwa Saitou.
- Hyperion, a Cast male NPC of the Ranger class. The chef of Delta Valiant's mess hall. Voiced by Hochu Otsuka.
- Calisto, a Human male NPC of the Force class. The mechanic of Delta Valiant. Voiced by Hiroshi Kamiya.
- Yuno, a mysterious holographic image girl who was encountered by Lutina and the protagonist. Voiced by Saori Hayami.

== Reception ==
The game received a Famitsu review score of 36/40. 107,313 physical retail copies of the game were sold within the first week of release in Japan, ranking at second place amongst all Japanese software sales for that week's sales charts.
