= Rieko Kodama =

Japanese video game artist and producer (1963–2022)

- 小玉 理恵子
- Born: May 1963; Yokosuka, Kanagawa, Japan
- Died: May 9, 2022 (aged 58–59)
- Other name: Phoenix Rie
- Occupations: Video game artist, director, and producer
- Employer: Sega (1984–2022)
- Known for: Phantasy Star series; Skies of Arcadia; 7th Dragon series

Rieko Kodama (Japanese: 小玉 理恵子, Hepburn: Kodama Rieko; May 1963 – May 9, 2022), also known as Phoenix Rie, was a Japanese video game artist, director, and producer employed by Sega from 1984 until her death. She is primarily known for her work on role-playing video games including the original Phantasy Star series, the 7th Dragon series, and Skies of Arcadia (2000). She is often recognized as one of the first successful women in the video game industry.

Kodama began her career at Sega as a graphic designer on arcade games and Master System games, including Alex Kidd in Miracle World (1986) and Phantasy Star (1987). The success of Phantasy Star led her to continue with the series thereafter, including directing Phantasy Star IV: The End of the Millennium (1993) for the Sega Genesis. She did artwork for other Genesis games, including Altered Beast (1988) and Sonic the Hedgehog (1991). Later, as producer, she oversaw the development of several Sega video games, including the critically successful Skies of Arcadia. Kodama remained a producer at Sega until her death. She received the Pioneer Award at the 2018 Game Developers Choice Awards in recognition of her lifelong contributions to video games.

== Early life and education ==
Rieko Kodama was born in Yokosuka, Kanagawa, Japan, in May 1963. (Note: Nintendo Power provides a birth date of May 25 and no year. Sega-16 provides a date of May 23, 1963.) She enjoyed playing arcade games as a child. In high school, Kodama was interested in designing advertising materials. After entering college, she felt indecisive between pursuing studies in art or archaeology, since she carried an interest in Egyptology. In her indecisiveness, she failed in all of her classes. She remembered her original interest in advertising and decided to dedicate herself fully to her art passion, enrolling in an advertising design program at a trade school. She grew an interest in graphic design and wanted to pursue doing her own work rather than trumpeting works of others as in the advertising business. The video game industry caught her attention as an emerging field. Home game consoles were new as most of the industry was still in the arcade field. The industry piqued Kodama's curiosity as she rarely went to the arcades and felt her unfamiliarity with the medium would make it a good way to challenge herself.

== Career ==
=== Early work ===
Kodama was hired by Sega in 1984 through one of her colleagues who was already employed there. She originally thought she was going to be working on advertising and graphic design, but after seeing the game development department, she felt that would be fun as well. She learned how to create graphics from Yoshiki Kawasaki, the sprite artist behind Flicky (1984). Her first job was as character designer for the arcade game Champion Boxing (1984). She continued to work on other arcade games such as Sega Ninja (1984). Because development times were short and Sega was low on design staff, Kodama would sometimes work on five to six games at once. She designed the art for Alex Kidd in Miracle World (1986) for the Master System, was "deeply involved" with the arcade and Master System versions of Quartet (1986), and created art for the Master System port of Fantasy Zone II: The Tears of Opa-Opa (1987). Kodama received small requests to design assets for other projects on a daily basis, such as the dragon from Miracle Warriors: Seal of the Dark Lord (1987) and an enemy for the SG-1000 port for The Black Onyx (1987). Kodama served as editor for the Japanese Sega newsletter Sega Players Enjoy Club (SPEC).

Kodama credited herself as "Phoenix Rie", "Phenix Rie" [sic], or some close variation in many of her early works. This was because at the time Sega did not allow developers to place their real names in their games. The pseudonym was based on the manga character Phoenix Ikki from Saint Seiya.

=== Phantasy Star ===
With the popularity of Enix's Dragon Quest role-playing game (RPG) series on the Famicom in the mid-1980s, Sega formed a team of several people to develop a competing RPG for the Master System, titled Phantasy Star (1987). Kodama served as the main artist for the game, designing the characters, the 2D environments, the battle screen backgrounds, non-playable characters, and other details. Star Wars was one of Kodama's favorite film series and was a significant inspiration for her when designing artwork for Phantasy Star. She enjoyed the way Star Wars took elements from Japanese and Asian culture and infused it with a science fiction setting. Following this notion, she gave the science fiction world of Phantasy Star a Western folklore feel and gave the characters medieval clothes.

One of the key design philosophies for Phantasy Star was to do things differently from existing RPGs, particularly the Dragon Quest series which she believed was too simple and pure of a fantasy world. One such challenge to differentiate Phantasy Star was to create a female hero. The female protagonist Alis, and another character, Lutz, were designed by Kodama. Other characters, as well as the game's monsters, were designed by other people. In the original story drafts, Lutz was written as intersex, and could become either male or female later in the game. She thought this was interesting, so chose to give Lutz an androgynous appearance in the final game. In this game and later Phantasy Star games, Kodama enjoyed creating a cast of characters uniting for a common purpose, regardless of gender, species, or home planet.

Phantasy Star was a critical and commercial success and a benchmark title for both the industry and the RPG genre. In later years, Kodama continued her work on the Phantasy Star series. She again led the graphic design for Phantasy Star II (1989) and later directed Phantasy Star IV: The End of the Millennium (1993). She helped during the planning stages of Phantasy Star III: Generations of Doom (1990). She also supervised the development of two Phantasy Star Collection compilations as well as remakes of Phantasy Star and Phantasy Star II for the PlayStation 2.

=== Later work ===
Beyond working on the Phantasy Star series during the Sega Genesis years, Kodama created artwork for other Sega games including Mega Drive versions of Sorcerian (1987), SpellCaster (1988), Altered Beast (1988), Alex Kidd in the Enchanted Castle (1989), Mystic Defender (1989), Shadow Dancer: The Secret of Shinobi (1990), Sonic the Hedgehog (1991), and Sonic the Hedgehog 2 (1992). After her success in directing Phantasy Star IV, she directed Magic Knight Rayearth (1995), an RPG for the Sega Saturn based on the manga series of the same name. She was involved in all aspects of the game including sales and marketing.

Kodama soon became a producer at the Sega Wow division and led the development of Skies of Arcadia, which released for the Dreamcast in 2000. As her first 3D RPG, Kodama felt her freedom of expression had expanded. The project began because her team wanted to create a completely 3D RPG for the Sega Saturn. The project was moved to the Dreamcast when the content became too large for the Saturn to process. According to Kodama, a defining element during development was to not rely on advanced graphics and particularly the CGI movies that were popular in games at the time, which Kodama felt took control away from the player. Kodama has stated that Skies of Arcadia along with the Phantasy Star series were her favorite projects she worked on.

In the mid-2000s, Kodama served as producer on edutainment games for the Nintendo DS and PlayStation Portable. Her last notable work was leading the production of the 7th Dragon series. The series includes 7th Dragon for the Nintendo DS, 7th Dragon 2020 and 7th Dragon 2020-II for the PlayStation Portable, and 7th Dragon III Code: VFD for the Nintendo 3DS. In 2018, she was the lead producer of the Sega Ages series.

=== Death ===
A memorial message dedicated to Kodama was included in the end credits of the Sega Genesis Mini 2, which was released on October 27, 2022. Addressing inquiries by IGN and Famitsu, Sega confirmed that Kodama had died on May 9, 2022, and initially refrained from a public announcement to respect her family's privacy.

== Legacy ==
Kodama has garnered recognition as one of the first female video game developers. The Next Level called her one of the first female video game artists, and Nintendo Power dubbed her the "First Lady of RPGs". Because of this recognition, she was often asked for her opinion about the role of women as video game developers and consumers, and the representation of women in video games.

Kodama believed that women are gradually taking a greater interest in gaming. She has observed that more girls are growing up around games, and thus are more willing to purchase them or enter the industry when older. In particular, she believed girls who enjoy RPGs will have a greater desire to work in the industry. She also thought it's more common for Japanese women to enter the field than other women because young girls enjoy games there more than in other countries. In 2010, she felt there were more female gamers in Japan due to the increase in games centered around cooking and fashion.

While Kodama did not design her games strictly for a female audience, she avoided including elements that treat women unfairly. She claimed that many games glorify violence and war which attracts male players overwhelmingly, so companies should be mindful and include elements that appeal to both genders if they want a larger female player base. Over time, she has found that there are more strong-willed women in games for female audiences. When making female characters herself, she desired to make characters both genders can relate to. However, since the majority of gamers are still male, and the nature of RPGs is to make the player feel as if they are the character, she understood why many companies gravitate to male heroes.

Kodama received the Pioneer Award for the 2018 Game Developers Choice Awards for her long career as a graphic artist, director and producer on numerous Sega titles. The ceremony was held at the 2019 Game Developers Conference in March 2019. Although Kodama no longer drew art assets directly for her games, she did paint and make handcrafts and accessories in her free time. She was also a fan of Dungeons & Dragons and the character Raistlin Majere from the Dragonlance series. She played the D&D table-top games and read the novels. She enjoyed the way dragons are portrayed with different personalities in western fantasy, which is different from dragons in Japanese culture. Kodama said that her favorite video game was Final Fantasy IV (1991).

== Selected works ==
=== Art ===
Year	Game	Platform	Ref.
1984	Champion Boxing	Arcade	
1985	Sega Ninja	Arcade	
1986	Alex Kidd in Miracle World	Master System	
1987	The Black Onyx	SG-1000	
1987	Quartet	Arcade, Master System	
1987	Zillion	Master System	
1987	Fantasy Zone II	Master System	
1987	Miracle Warriors	Master System	
1987	Phantasy Star	Master System	
1988	Hoshi wo Sagashite...	Master System	
1988	SpellCaster	Master System	
1988	Altered Beast	Sega Genesis	
1989	Alex Kidd in the Enchanted Castle	Sega Genesis	
1989	Phantasy Star II	Sega Genesis	
1989	Mystic Defender	Sega Genesis	
1990	Sorcerian	Sega Genesis	
1990	Shadow Dancer: The Secret of Shinobi	Sega Genesis	
1991	Sonic the Hedgehog	Sega Genesis	
1992	Sonic the Hedgehog 2	Sega Genesis	

=== Director ===
Year	Game	Platform	Ref.
1993	Phantasy Star IV	Sega Genesis	
1995	Magic Knight Rayearth	Sega Saturn	

=== Producer ===
Year	Game	Platform	Ref.
1998	Deep Fear	Sega Saturn	
2000	Skies of Arcadia	Dreamcast	
2002	Skies of Arcadia Legends	GameCube	
2005	Project Altered Beast	PlayStation 2	
2006	Mind Quiz	Nintendo DS, PlayStation Portable	
2006	Nou ni Kaikan Aha Taiken!	PlayStation Portable	
2006	Nou ni Kaikan Minna de Aha Taiken!	PlayStation Portable	
2007	Saitou Takashi no DS de Yomu Sansyoku Ballpen Meisaku Jyuku	Nintendo DS	
2009	7th Dragon	Nintendo DS	
2011	7th Dragon 2020	PlayStation Portable	
2013	7th Dragon 2020-II	PlayStation Portable	
2015	7th Dragon III Code: VFD	Nintendo 3DS	
2018	Sega Ages	Nintendo Switch	
