= Phantasy Star II =

1989 video game

- North American cover art
- Developer: Sega
- Publisher: Sega
- Director: Chieko Aoki
- Producer: Yuji Naka
- Programmer: Yuji Naka
- Artist: Rieko Kodama
- Writer: Chieko Aoki
- Composer: Tokuhiko Uwabo
- Series: Phantasy Star
- Platform: Sega Genesis
- Release: JP: March 21, 1989; NA: March 1990; EU: 1990
- Genre: Role-playing
- Mode: Single-player

Phantasy Star II (Note: Japanese: ファンタシースターII 還らざる時の終わりに, Hepburn: Phantasy Star II: At the End of the Restoration) is a science fantasy role-playing video game developed and published by Sega for the Sega Genesis. It was released in Japan in 1989 and North America and Europe in 1990. It was later ported to a variety of different platforms. An updated remake, Phantasy Star Generation 2 (Note: Japanese: ファンタシースター generation:2), was released for the PlayStation 2 in 2005 in Japan.

Phantasy Star II is the second installment in Sega's acclaimed Phantasy Star series and serves as a sequel to the original Phantasy Star for the Master System. Phantasy Star II takes place 1,000 years after the events of its predecessor and follows the journey of a government agent named Rolf and his friends, who are on a mission to discover why the protector of the planet Mota, Mother Brain, has started malfunctioning.

Phantasy Star II was the first video game to use a 6 mega-bit cartridge, making it the biggest video game on a console at the time. Since its release Phantasy Star II has been the subject of critical acclaim.

== Gameplay ==
Phantasy Star II's top-down style travel is shown with protagonists Rolf and Nei moving through a town.

Gameplay is similar to the original Phantasy Star, the first game in the series. Its battle system is turn-based as well as menu-based, allowing the player to choose commands for their party of up to four characters. Each of the eight characters has a different set of preferred weapons and armor, as well as techniques, suited to the character's job. The player must defeat enemies in the overworld and in dungeons to advance in the game.

The game abandoned the first-person view that the first game used for dungeons and battles. Phantasy Star II instead uses a top-down perspective for exploration and a third-person view in battles.

== Plot ==
In the Algo Star System, a thousand years after heroes Alis, Odin, Myau, and Noah saved it from King Lassic and Dark Falz, (Note: As depicted in Phantasy Star (1987)) the planet Mota thrives under the control of the Mother Brain, a giant computer that has terraformed the once-desert planet into a lush, green world with domed farms. However, this peaceful existence has made people complacent, forgetting the heroes of old and their fighting spirit. A new threat emerges as "biomonsters", biologically engineered creatures, plague Algo.

Rolf, an agent in Mota's capital Paseo, is haunted by recurring nightmares of a young girl battling a demonic monster, unable to intervene. He is assigned a critical mission by the Commander to investigate the biomonster outbreak by retrieving the system recorder from the BioSystem lab to analyze why these creatures are being produced. Accompanied reluctantly by Nei, a half-human, half-biomonster girl he rescued seven months prior and now considers a sister, Rolf begins his journey. Along the way, he is joined by a diverse group of companions: Rudolf "Rudo" Steiner, a biomonster hunter skilled with guns; Amy Sage, a newly graduated medic; Hugh Thompson, a biology scholar who values life; Anna Zirski, a blade-wielding mercenary; Josh Kain, a junk salesman adept against machines; and Shir Gold, a thief seeking excitement.

Their journey takes them to the ruined town of Arima, destroyed by hoodlums, where they learn that Darum, the man Rolf rescued Nei from, turned violent after his daughter Tiem was kidnapped. At the hoodlums' hideout in Shure, Rolf finds a ransom letter revealing Darum's descent into crime to save Tiem. The party rescues Tiem, dressing her in a veil to conceal her identity, but when Tiem confronts Darum to stop his killing, he fails to recognize her and kills her. Devastated, Darum commits suicide, leaving Rolf determined to restore peace to Mota.

At the BioSystem lab, Rolf retrieves the system recorder, which reveals that an unnatural energy surge from Climacontrol, meant to control weather, was redirected to the BioSystem, causing the biomonster outbreak. The party heads to Climacontrol, where they encounter Neifirst, a vengeful predecessor to Nei, created through human-animal gene experiments. Neifirst admits to creating biomonsters to punish humans for manipulating nature. In a confrontation, Nei fights Neifirst to stop her, but is mortally wounded. Before dying, Nei asks Rolf to prevent more monsters like her from being created. Upon Neifirst's defeat, Climacontrol's energy surges, causing a flood risk as water flows into a lake instead of being distributed as rain.

To avert disaster, Rolf and his party manually open four dams, but are then captured by security robots, accused of causing the Mother Brain's malfunctions, and transported to the prison satellite Gaila. An explosion on Gaila leads to their rescue by Tyler, a space pirate who reveals that Gaila's collision destroyed the planet Palm. From him, Rolf learns of a figure on the planet Dezo who opposes the Mother Brain. At Esper Mansion in Dezo, Lutz, the last ESPer and a hero from a thousand years ago, reveals Rolf as Alis's descendant, his nightmares symbolizing her ancient battle against Dark Falz. Lutz warns that the Mother Brain is a trap weakening Algo's people and sends Rolf to confront it on the spaceship Noah.

On Noah, Rolf's party faces the Mother Brain, which mocks their resolve, claiming Algo's people depend on its control. After defeating the Mother Brain, Algo is freed, but its systems, including BioSystem and Climacontrol, cease functioning, promising a challenging future. The crew of Noah, survivors from a destroyed Earth, reveal they created the Mother Brain to dominate Algo out of jealousy for its peace. Led by their captain, they attack Rolf's party, blaming them for the Mother Brain's destruction. Rolf and his companions stand united, determined to fight for Algo's future against the Earthlings, aware that the carefree days of the past are gone forever.

== Release ==
=== Localization changes ===
- Lutz, a refugee Esper who lives in the Esper Mansion on Dezo, aids Rolf and friends in their mission. He is supposed to be the same Esper who accompanies Alis as "Noah" in the original Phantasy Star, but as Phantasy Star II names him Lutz internationally, this connection is lost in translation.
- In the Japanese version, Ustvestia, a musician who teaches the characters the Musik technique, is openly gay; when requested to teach a male character the Musik technique, he comments, "He looks cute", and charges less than he would for teaching female characters. Any obvious references to this were removed from the American release; he instead comments, "He looks smart" – and still charges less for teaching the male characters.
- While the tracks in the soundtrack are the same for both versions, the snare drums are much louder in the Japanese version.
- In the Japanese version the game is set 942 years after the events of Phantasy Star I.

=== Ports ===
Phantasy Star II was re-released as a port in two different forms for the Sega Saturn and Game Boy Advance as part of Phantasy Star Collection. It was also released on the Sega Smash Pack for Windows, and Dreamcast. It is also part of the Sega Genesis Collection for PlayStation 2 and PlayStation Portable. The game is available in Sonic's Ultimate Genesis Collection for Xbox 360 and PlayStation 3. The game is also included as part of Sega Genesis Classics for Xbox One, PlayStation 4, Nintendo Switch, Windows, macOS, and Linux.

The game was made available through Nintendo's Virtual Console service in 2008. On June 10, 2009, it was released on Xbox Live Arcade under the Sega Vintage Collection banner. On August 26, 2010, an iPhone port of the game was released. The port later became available on the iPad and iPod touch as well. On June 22, 2017, Sega made the game available for free through both iTunes and Android.

In October 1993, Atari Corporation filed a lawsuit against Sega for an alleged infringement of a patent originally created by Atari Corp. in the 1980s, and Atari sought a preliminary injunction to stop manufacturing, usage, and sales of hardware and software for the Genesis and Game Gear. On September 28, 1994, both parties reached a settlement involving a cross-licensing agreement to publish up to five games each year across their systems until 2001. Phantasy Star II was one of the first five games approved from the deal by Sega in order to be converted for the Atari Jaguar, but it was never released.

Phantasy Star II would eventually see a rerelease on the Sega Genesis Mini 2 in October 2022, along with 60 other games. Ported by M2, this version features a few quality of life additions, including a faster run speed, faster combat and animations, and an additional mode where EXP and Meseta (the game's in-game currency) are doubled, to eliminate some level grinding. These changes were met with positive reception.

== Reception and legacy ==
Contemporary reception

Review scores
Publication	Score
ACE	887/1000
Aktueller Software Markt	56/60
Dragon	5/5
Electronic Gaming Monthly	7/10, 9/10, 8/10, 8/10
Joystick	97%
Player One	95%
Raze	90%
VideoGames & Computer Entertainment	9/10
Zero	89%
Mega	88%
Sega Power	94%

=== Contemporary ===
Its demonstration at the Winter Consumer Electronics Show (Winter CES) in January 1990 received a positive reception. The original Phantasy Star game was a big game for its time, and because of the advancements in technology between the Master System and Genesis, Phantasy Star II featured a much larger cartridge than its predecessor, holding 6 megabits of data, making it the largest game on any game machine up until that time. RePlay magazine praised the game for providing a lengthy home video game experience not found in arcades, and reported it could take about 250 hours to complete.

The game was well received by critics upon release. In Dragon magazine, Phantasy Star II was described as "one of the best role-playing games yet to be released for any video game system." Wizardry designer Roe R. Adams wrote in Computer Gaming World that Phantasy Star II was a system seller for the Genesis, stating that its "16-bit graphics are gorgeous, but the real fun lies in the science fiction story plot." He concluded that it is a "challenging and enjoyable" game with "superb combat and animated graphics." Raze concluded that it is a "challenging quest packed with gameplay."

=== Retrospective ===
Retrospective reception

Aggregate scores
Aggregator	Score		
Aggregator	iOS	Sega Genesis	Xbox 360
GameRankings	N/A	80%	N/A
Metacritic	N/A	N/A	64/100

Review scores
Publication	Score		
Publication	iOS	Sega Genesis	Xbox 360
IGN	8.5/10	N/A	7/10
HonestGamers	N/A	10/10	N/A

Phantasy Star II was a landmark game in its time, "a game of many firsts" according to Nintendo Power. It was the first RPG for the Mega Drive, and was released in the U.S. four months before the original Final Fantasy for the NES, another key game in the genre's popularization in North America.

Phantasy Star II is regarded by many as a forerunner for certain aspects of role-playing video games, such as an epic, dramatic, character-driven storyline dealing with serious themes and subject matter, a strategy-based battle system, and the demand for extensive strategy guides for such games (Phantasy Star II included one with the game itself). Phantasy Star II's predominantly science fiction setting was also a major departure for RPGs, which had previously been largely restricted to fantasy or science fantasy settings. The game's science fiction story was also unique, reversing the common alien invasion scenario by instead presenting Earthlings as the invading antagonists rather than the defending protagonists. The game's strong characterization, and use of self-discovery as a motivating factor for the characters and the player, was a major departure from previous RPGs and had a major influence on subsequent RPGs such as the Final Fantasy series. It also made an attempt at social commentary years before the Final Fantasy series started doing the same. Tor.com described the worldbuilding as "fantastic, probably the best in any 16-bit era game."

Phantasy Star II has made a number of "greatest games of all time" type lists, including being inducted into GameSpot's list of greatest games of all time in 2005. Mega placed the game at #29 in their "Top Mega Drive Games of All Time" in 1992. In 1997 Electronic Gaming Monthly ranked it the 30th best console video game of all time, saying it was the best RPG on the Genesis due to its characters, story, enemies, and massive length. In 2003, IGN ranked it as the 92nd top game, choosing Phantasy Star II for how it "surprised everyone with the death of a major player 1/3 the way" years before Final Fantasy VII, in addition to "a balanced experience point system, tough-as-nails bosses, and one of the biggest and most difficult RPG quests that we've ever seen." In 2009, Nintendo Power called Phantasy Star II, along with Phantasy Star IV, one of the greatest role-playing games of all time. In 2011, GamePro included it in its list of "20 Games That Defined Role-Playing Games".

Levi Buchanan of IGN reviewed the iPhone version in 2010. He praised it as an "awesome game" with a "real sense of discovery" and one of his "favorite final twists in videogames."

=== Remake ===
A remake, Phantasy Star Generation 2, was released in Japan for the PlayStation 2 as a part of Sega Ages in 2005. Much like Phantasy Star Generation 1, the remake mirrors the events of the original game while adding character development and fleshing out the story in more detail. It featured enhanced graphics, a revised combat system, and a rearranged soundtrack. Other new features included the ability to play the original Mega Drive version, and to load a system file from Phantasy Star Generation:1 to allow the ability to play as Nei throughout the entire game.

It was originally slated for North American and European release by Conspiracy Entertainment as a part of the Phantasy Star Trilogy, a compilation of the remakes of Phantasy Star, Phantasy Star II, and Phantasy Star IV. The compilation's future is uncertain, however, since Sega reclaimed the publishing rights for North America and Europe. This is evidenced by the fact that the trilogy no longer appears on Conspiracy Entertainment's list of products on their website. Sega has abandoned their plans for a Phantasy Star IV remake in favor of a compilation featuring the original iterations of Phantasy Star I–IV.

Game designer Yasushi Yamaguchi, who was responsible for the "Mechanical Design" in the game, expressed interest for a 3D remake.
