= Phantasy Star IV =

1993 video game

Phantasy Star IV: The End of the Millennium
- North American box art by Boris Vallejo
- Developer: Sega
- Publisher: Sega
- Directors: Rieko Kodama; Toru Yoshida; Kiyoshi Takeuchi
- Producer: Jerry Markota
- Artist: Toru Yoshida
- Writers: Akinori Nishiyama; Toru Yoshida
- Composers: Izuho Takeuchi; Masaki Nakagaki
- Series: Phantasy Star
- Platform: Sega Genesis
- Release: JP: December 17, 1993; NA: February 1995; EU: November 1995
- Genre: Role-playing
- Mode: Single-player

Phantasy Star IV: The End of the Millennium (Note: Japanese: ファンタシースター 千年紀の終りに, Hepburn: Fantashī Sutā Sennenki no Owari Ni) is a 1993 role-playing video game developed and published by Sega for the Sega Genesis. The fourth main installment in the Phantasy Star series, it is the final title in the original tetralogy and is currently the last traditional role-playing game in the franchise. The game's plot follows the hunters Alys and Chaz, as well as their traveling party, attempting to stop an ecological crisis from destroying their solar system. Phantasy Star IV kept many of the gameplay elements of the previous game, including turn-based battles, overhead exploration, and magic spells. It received positive reviews and has been listed among the greatest video games of all time.

== Gameplay ==
Phantasy Star IV is an archetypal role-playing video game, featuring the staples of exploration, NPC interaction, and turn-based combat. Like the previous games in the Phantasy Star series, individual characters each have their own statistics and equipment that determine the character's performance in combat, improving their statistics by gaining experience levels (achieved through victory in combat). Additionally, non-android characters have access to "Techniques" (i.e. magic spells), the use of which draw upon a character's pool of "Technique Points" (TP), with new techniques being learned as a character gains levels.

Phantasy Star IV has a number of features new to the series, including combination techniques, manga-style panel illustrations that accompany the narrative, and an expanded script.

The instruction manual for the American version states that there are 15 possible combination-attacks. However, only 14 were ever discovered. Occasionally, the "secret technique" Feeve, a useless technique accessible through hacking, is mistaken for the "lost 15th combo".

== Plot ==
Chaz and Alys exploring a town

Phantasy Star IV takes place 1,000 years after the events of Phantasy Star II and 1,000 years before the era of Phantasy Star III. After an event called the Great Collapse, much of the once-thriving planet Motavia has reverted to its original desert-state as the climate and biosphere-controlling devices installed over a thousand years previously begin to fail, and life has become progressively more difficult for the planet's inhabitants. To make matters worse, there has been a marked increase in the numbers of the "biomonsters", a catch-all term for the strange and violent aberrations of Motavia's flora and fauna. Keeping these creatures under control is the job of "hunters."

Hired by Piata Academy on Motavia, hunters Alys Brangwin and her young partner Chaz Ashley begin their investigation into the relationship between the biomonster problem and the planet's ecological crisis. Joined by others along the way, they connect the world's troubles to a cult leader called Zio, "The Black Magician", whose aims appear to be total annihilation of not only Motavia but of the whole Algol solar system. During their initial confrontation, Zio summons Dark Force and mortally wounds Alys with its Dark Energy Wave. Taking the lead upon her passing, Chaz is joined by Alys's wizard acquaintance Rune Walsh who helps break the barrier on Zio's tower and eliminate the wizard to restore the computer systems maintaining Motavia. With no change in Algo's abnormal conditions, the party turns their attention to a malfunctioning satellite space station found to be contaminated by Dark Force, which they are forced to engage and purge. However, Algo's disasters remain unabated and the party is further baffled as they encounter multiple incarnations of Dark Force along the way.

Traveling to Rykros, an unknown fourth planet of the Algo solar system, Chaz and his companions learn of the Profound Darkness: a powerful entity banished behind a planetary seal billions of years ago that is able to manifest its hatred in physical form as Dark Force every thousand years due to fluctuations in the seal. With the seal now severely weakened by the planet Parma's destruction during the Great Collapse, Chaz and his party enter the Profound Darkness's dimension and eliminate it before it is able to break completely free and destroy the galaxy. With the evil banished for good and the party going their separate ways, Rika – a numan girl in the group – chooses to stay behind with Chaz as they bid everyone farewell, remembering the sacrifice of those who have defended Algo through the ages and awaiting the next one to come.

== Release ==
The game was released in Japan in December 1993, North America in February 1995 and the United Kingdom and Europe in November 1995. The End of the Millennium was the first Phantasy Star title not to be localized to Brazil by Tec Toy. Sega initially stated that they would not publish the game in Europe.

In the United States, the game retailed for just under $100.

The cover art for the American and European releases was done by Boris Vallejo. Both covers depict Chaz, Rika, and Rune, but the American/European box art deviates from their appearance in-game.

In Japan, the game was initially announced as Phantasy Star IV, but by the time of release, it had been renamed Phantasy Star: The End of the Millennium. At the time, this renaming was seen by the gaming press as an attempt to make it clear that the game was a followup to Phantasy Star II. The American and European releases took the title Phantasy Star IV, though the title screen of all versions of the game reads Phantasy Star: The End of the Millennium. The titles are combined to Phantasy Star IV: The End of the Millennium in the Sega Genesis Collection compilation.

Phantasy Star IV was the last Phantasy Star game until Phantasy Star Online (2000), which has a mainly unrelated story.

=== Ports and remakes ===
An unlicensed demake of the game for the 8 bits NES famiclones was published in Chinese by Fuzhou Waixing Computer Science & Technology Co. Ltd. in 1996.

The game was ported as part of Phantasy Star Collection for the Sega Saturn, released only in Japan. It was also included in the Sega Genesis Collection, Sonic's Ultimate Genesis Collection, Sega Genesis Classics, and the Sega Genesis Mini. Sega Ages planned a remake for the PlayStation 2 console, having revamped the first two games: Phantasy Star Generation 1 and Phantasy Star Generation 2.

== Reception ==
Reception

Aggregate score
Aggregator	Score
GameRankings	87%

Review scores
Publication	Score
Electronic Gaming Monthly	8/10, 8.5/10, 7/10, 7.5/10
Eurogamer	8/10
Famitsu	8/10, 5/10, 8/10, 5/10
GameFan	90/100, 97/100, 92/100
GamePro	4/5
IGN	9/10
Mean Machines Sega	88%
Next Generation	3/5
Nintendo Life	9/10
RPGamer	9/10
RPGFan	90%
Sega Power	87%
Sega Pro	95%
Sega Saturn Magazine	90%

Phantasy Star IV: End of the Millennium received generally positive reviews upon release, with critics praising the gameplay but with mixed reactions to the story and graphics. GamePro praised the ability to inspect background objects, the convenience of the macros and talk option, the translation, and the story sequences. However, they commented that the inability to purchase multiple items at once is irritating, and described the story as frequently incoherent and occasionally derogatory towards women. Next Generation remarked that Phantasy Star IV, "while still a good game, is years behind." They elaborated that while other RPGs were making major innovations to the genre in both graphics and gameplay, Phantasy Star IV still fundamentally looked and played the same as Phantasy Star II from five years before. The four reviewers of Electronic Gaming Monthly commented that the magic/technique system, equipment and general gameplay are all highly involving and enjoyable, but that the graphics are mediocre, the music is irritating, and the story is too slow-paced. Sega Saturn Magazine (previously Sega Magazine) said that the graphics are outdated even compared to other Mega Drive/Genesis games and that the game is incomprehensible to newcomers to the series, but that "the game succeeds by creating cinematic moments, introducing new characters and powers, and taking many weird and wonderful plot turns." Mean Machines Sega criticized the graphics, animation, and effects, but praised the playability, story, and lastability, calling it the "best pure RPG for the Megadrive." The three reviewers of GameFan rated it 90, 97, and 92, stating the "graphics are beautiful, the music is powerful, and the non-stop original ideas make this cartridge an absolute must-own for the RPG enthusiast" while criticizing the translation.

Retrospective reviews have been very positive, with praise for the gameplay, story and visuals. In RPGamer, Sephirstein praised the title as one of the greatest RPGs he had ever played, with "magnificent graphics, sensational soundtrack, gripping story and incredible battle system". Parn of RPGFan also called it one of "the best RPGs ever made". Reviews for the Virtual Console release were also very positive. Nintendo Life's Corbie Dillard said that one could not have asked for a better end to the 16-bit series. IGN called it one of the definitive 16-bit role-playing games, stating the "storyline and characters are deep and engaging", the "attractive anime-style cutscenes steal the show visually", and the gameplay is both "classic and unique at the same time". Tor.com described it as "an ambitious JRPG that is the perfect end to the series, taking the best elements of each of the previous games and weaving together a 'phantastic' journey." Eurogamer stated that it is "epic in scope" and recommended that "anyone with a fondness for JRPGs should investigate this at once".

In 2007, IGN ranked Phantasy Star IV as the 61st best game ever made. In 2012, IGN placed Phantasy Star IV at number 59 in their Top 100 RPGs of all time, citing the elegantly simple mechanics and the game's influence on Phantasy Star Online (which they ranked as number 23 on the list). In 2009, Nintendo Power labelled the title, along with Phantasy Star II, as one of the greatest RPGs of all time. Complex ranked the game number 2, behind only Gunstar Heroes, in its list of the best Sega Genesis games.
