= Phantasy Star =

Video game series by Sega

- Genres: Role-playing; Action role-playing
- Developers: Sega; Sonic Team; tri-Ace
- Publisher: Sega
- Creators: Kotaro Hayashida, Yuji Naka, Rieko Kodama, Chieko Aoki
- Platform: List: Dreamcast Game Boy Advance GameCube Game Gear iOS Android Windows Nintendo DS Nintendo Switch PlayStation 2 PlayStation 4 PlayStation 5 PlayStation Portable PlayStation Vita Sega Genesis Master System Sega Mega-CD Sega Saturn Virtual Console Xbox Xbox 360 Xbox One Xbox Series X/S
- First release: Phantasy Star; December 20, 1987
- Latest release: Phantasy Star Online 2: New Genesis; June 9, 2021

Phantasy Star (Note: Japanese: ファンタシースター, Hepburn: Fantashī Sutā) is a series of console role-playing video games and other supplementary media created by Sega. The series debuted in 1987 on the Master System with Phantasy Star, and continues into the present with Phantasy Star Online 2 and other extensions of the Phantasy Star Online sub-series. Each of the games in the series features a science fantasy setting featuring a cross-genre combination of magic and technology.

The first four games in the series are set in or related to the fictional planetary system of Algol, and are single-player turn-based role-playing games. Later games in the series are chiefly action role-playing games, and some contain massively multiplayer online game elements. There are currently four distinct Phantasy Star subseries, each set in its own universe. Cameos or nods to other subseries may appear, and some concepts and terminology are shared across them, similarly to Suikoden, Breath of Fire, Dragon Quest, and Final Fantasy.

== Original series ==
Release timeline
1987	Phantasy Star
1988
1989	Phantasy Star II
1990	Phantasy Star III
1991
1992	Phantasy Star Adventure
1992	Phantasy Star Gaiden
1993	Phantasy Star IV
1994–1999
2000	Phantasy Star Online
2001
2002	Phantasy Star Online Episode II
2003	Phantasy Star Online Episode III: C.A.R.D. Revolution
2004
2005	Phantasy Star Online Episode IV
2006	Phantasy Star Universe
2007	Phantasy Star Universe: Ambition of the Illuminus
2008	Phantasy Star 0
2008	Phantasy Star Portable
2009	Phantasy Star Portable 2
2010
2011	Phantasy Star Portable 2 Infinity
2012	Phantasy Star Online 2
2013	Phantasy Star Online 2: Episode 2
2013	Phantasy Star Online 2 es
2014	Phantasy Star Online 2: Episode 3
2014	Phantasy Star Nova
2015
2016	Phantasy Star Online 2: Episode 4
2017	Phantasy Star Online 2: Episode 5
2018	Idola: Phantasy Star Saga
2019	Phantasy Star Online 2: Episode 6
2020
2021	Phantasy Star Online 2: New Genesis

The original series takes place in the Algol Solar System, which consists of four planets: Palma, a fertile agricultural world; Motavia, a desert planet; Dezoris, an ice planet; and the mysterious Rykros, whose elongated orbit brings it within visible range only once every thousand years. Players travel to all four planets throughout the series, interacting with each unique set of inhabitants and discovering the secrets to the solar system's genesis, which is irrevocably tied to an ancient conflict.

- Phantasy Star was the first installment of the series, released for the Master System in Japan on December 20, 1987, and then in the United States and Europe in 1988. It introduced players to the planets, races, and lore of the series. The game follows the adventures of Alis Landale, a young woman from Palma. After Alis's brother Nero is killed by the formerly benevolent government of King Lassic, Alis embarks upon a quest for revenge. She is joined in her rebellion by a muskcat named Myau, a warrior named Odin, and a wizard named Noah. Together, the group defeats Lassic, but discover that he was only being controlled by the malevolent entity Darkfalz. Alis and her companions defeat Darkfalz and restore peace to Algol. It is then revealed that Alis was the lost princess to Algol's monarchy, and is given the option to accept her birthright.
- Phantasy Star II, released in March 1989, marked the series' transition to the Sega Genesis. It benefited from an upgrade in graphics and in the scope of its quest, as it's more than twice the size of its predecessor. It tells the story of Rolf, a government agent from the town of Paseo on Motavia. In this new setting, 1,000 years after Phantasy Star, Motavia is no longer a desert world, but has been mostly converted into one lush with vegetation and animal life, thanks to a system-wide computer network known as Mother Brain. However, malfunctions throughout the network are resulting in all sorts of catastrophes, from climate change to the appearance of mutant plant and animal life called biomonsters. Rolf changes from an agent of the government to a rebel fated to end Mother Brain's reign over the system. He is joined by a colorful cast of characters, all of whom have their own stakes in the conflict. Beset by the biomonsters at first and government-deployed robots afterward, Rolf and his allies eventually must fight both Dark Force, the enemy from 1,000 years ago, and the Mother Brain.
- Phantasy Star III: Generations of Doom, released for the Mega Drive in 1990 and on the Genesis in 1991, was a departure from the previous games in that the different worlds were no longer the different planets of the Algol system. The game revolves around two feuding factions, the Orakians and the Layans, who have been engaged in bitter conflict since their founders disappeared 1,000 years earlier; the factions assume their founders were bitter enemies who fought each other. Unique to Phantasy Star III was a storyline that spanned three generations, starting with Rhys, an Orakian, and continues through two more generations, with the player controlling Rhys's son and grandchildren. At the end of each generation, the player determines the next main character by choosing which of the women encountered during the adventure the characters will marry. Rhys and his children eventually discover the true nature of the world and the conflict - that the seven 'worlds' were actually subsections of the colony ship Alisa III sent into deep space after the destruction of Palm. Somehow Dark Force was able to accompany the fleeing colonists and work to turn them against each other; Rhys' grandchild or grandchildren defeat Dark Force to restore peace to Alisa III.
- Phantasy Star IV: The End of the Millennium was released for the Mega Drive in Japan in November 1993, in the United States in February 1995, and in Europe in December 1995. Building on its predecessors, it added a number of new features, such as pre-programmable combat maneuvers called "Macros", combination attacks between two or more characters and manga-style panel illustrations for major cutscenes. It was also the first game in the series to have in-depth character interaction and development. Taking place 1,000 years after Phantasy Star II, Phantasy Star IV returns to the Algol Solar System, which has been in a precipitous decline after the destruction of Mother Brain, an event known as the Great Collapse. The people struggle to survive against an unforgiving climate and a resurgence of biomonsters. Among them are Chaz Ashley and his mentor Alys Brangwin, hunters who make a living performing various tasks for clients: from protecting citizens from monster attacks to investigating strange events. As seemingly random occurrences all tie back into the system-wide crisis, Chaz and the allies he meets during his quest must fulfill the series promise of fighting back the re-emergence of darkness. However, in this, the end of the original series, players will not only face off against the incarnation of evil, but also rescue Algol once and for all from a bleak fate.

=== Compilations and remakes of the original series ===
- Phantasy Star Collection is a compilation of the four games from the original series, released in 1998 only in Japan on the Sega Saturn, as part of the Sega Ages series. It also includes full motion videos of the original television commercials for the games and 215 pieces of official art. A Game Boy Advance version, produced by Digital Eclipse, was released for international audiences in 2002. This version omits Phantasy Star IV, the full motion videos, and the art gallery. Three of the four games were released again on the PlayStation 2 as part of the Sega Genesis Collection, and all four appeared on Sonic's Ultimate Genesis Collection for the Xbox 360 and PlayStation 3 consoles. This compilation includes special features such as behind-the-scenes information, and the ability to save the game anywhere.
- Phantasy Star Generation 1 is an enhanced remake of Phantasy Star, released in 2003 for the PlayStation 2, as Volume 1 of the Sega Ages series. It features newly designed graphics, arranged versions of music from the original game soundtrack, and fleshed out dialogue which results in both character development and a richer story.
- Phantasy Star Generation 2 was released in 2005, also for the PlayStation 2, and is an enhanced remake of Phantasy Star II, and is volume 17 of the Sega Ages series. It mirrors the events of the original game while adding character development and fleshing out the story in more detail. It features enhanced graphics, a revised combat system, and a re-arranged soundtrack.
- Phantasy Star Complete Collection (Note: Japanese: SEGA AGES 2500シリーズ Vol.32 ファンタシースター コンプリートコレクション) was released in 2008, only in Japan for the PlayStation 2 and in 2012 as a download for the PlayStation 3 on the PlayStation Network. It's volume 32 of the Sega Ages 2500 series. It contained the original Master System game, as well as the three games published for the Mega Drive, and the text adventures published through Sega Meganet. Note that the collection consists of the original games, not the enhanced versions mentioned above.

=== Spin-offs of the original series ===
- Hoshi wo Sagashite..., released in 1988 for the Mark III/Master System, is a Japan-exclusive adventure game set within the same universe as Phantasy Star. It references planets from Phantasy Star, such as Motavia and Palma.
- Phantasy Star Gaiden (Note: ファンタシースター・外伝, Fantashī Sutā Gaiden), released in 1992 for the Game Gear, is a spin-off of the original Phantasy Star and takes place on a colony known as Copto, founded by the heroine Alis Landale. In this new setting, Alis is once again called upon to battle evil, now in the form of a being known as Kaburon, which she is able to seal away. The majority of the game then follows the adventures of new characters, Minina and Alec, some 400 years later until they reunite with Alis, who had been in cryogenic sleep in a vigil against Kaburon's return. After Copto is saved, the game foreshadows the reemergence of evil back in Algol in Phantasy Star II.
- Phantasy Star Adventure is a first-person puzzle adventure game released in 1992 for the Game Gear prior to Phantasy Star Gaiden. Taking place at the same time as Phantasy Star II, it puts the players in the shoes of an agent of Paseo. He receives a letter from friend and scientist, Ken Miller, who is studying on the ice planet Dezolis and invites him to see an important new invention. Once there, the player learns that Ken and his device are missing, initiating an investigation.
- Phantasy Star II Text Adventures were a series of eight text adventure video games available to users of Sega Meganet, a modem for the Sega Mega Drive in Japan, and later released as part of a compilation on Sega CD. Each of the games takes place shortly before Phantasy Star II, documenting the backgrounds of its characters, and explaining what brings them to the town Paseo where they eventually team up to investigate the pervasive troubles of the Algol Solar System.

== Online series ==
=== Phantasy Star Online ===
- Phantasy Star Online is a series of online role-playing games originally released for Dreamcast in 2000, and continuing on the Xbox, GameCube, and Microsoft Windows. Phantasy Star Online started a new adventure, centering on the plight of a colony of spaceships called Pioneer 2, in another star system. Players fight through a number of levels spread over four distinct areas, finally facing off against Dark Falz, a nod to the original series. In addition to the main story, players can also take the Hunter's Guild sidequests, which explores the lives of Pioneer 2's citizens, and further delve into the backstory behind the game. In the tradition of MMORPGs, these sidequests reward players with Meseta, the chance to explore the stories behind Pioneer 2's NPC residents, and the opportunity to obtain special weapons.
  - Phantasy Star Online Episode I & II was not a simple port of the Dreamcast game (only Episode I). It included a brand new episode not available in the original Dreamcast version (PSO Episode II is not to be mistaken with PSO Version 2 available for the Dreamcast). The game was released for the GameCube and Xbox in 2002, and introduced several new features, such as multiplayer split-screen mode, three new character classes, game rebalancing, reduced experience point requirements, class recalibration, and five newly explorable areas.
  - Phantasy Star Online Episode III: C.A.R.D. Revolution, released only for the GameCube, marked yet another departure from series establishments, featuring a card-based play style. Taking place twenty-one years after Episode I and Episode II, it follows the people of Pioneer 2 as they continue their settlement on the planet Ragol. The government, amid inner strife, seeks to use a mysterious substance discovered on the planet, known as the germ, to power the newly developed Compressed Alternate Reality Data (C.A.R.D.) technology. Players take on the roles of both agents appointed by the government to explore, research, and capture the rebel elements, or the Arkz, rebel elements themselves trying to intercept and destroy the government's plans for the exploitation of the planet.
  - Phantasy Star Online Blue Burst was released exclusively for Microsoft Windows in 2004. At first, it was largely a PC port of Episode I & II, plus some new items and features. The following year, an expansion pack titled Episode IV was released, featuring new areas to explore. With the closure of Blue Burst servers in 2010, this online-only version of the game and its expansion cannot be played except on unofficial private servers hosted by fans. All other games in the series do not require an internet connection and can still be played normally.

=== Phantasy Star Online 2 ===
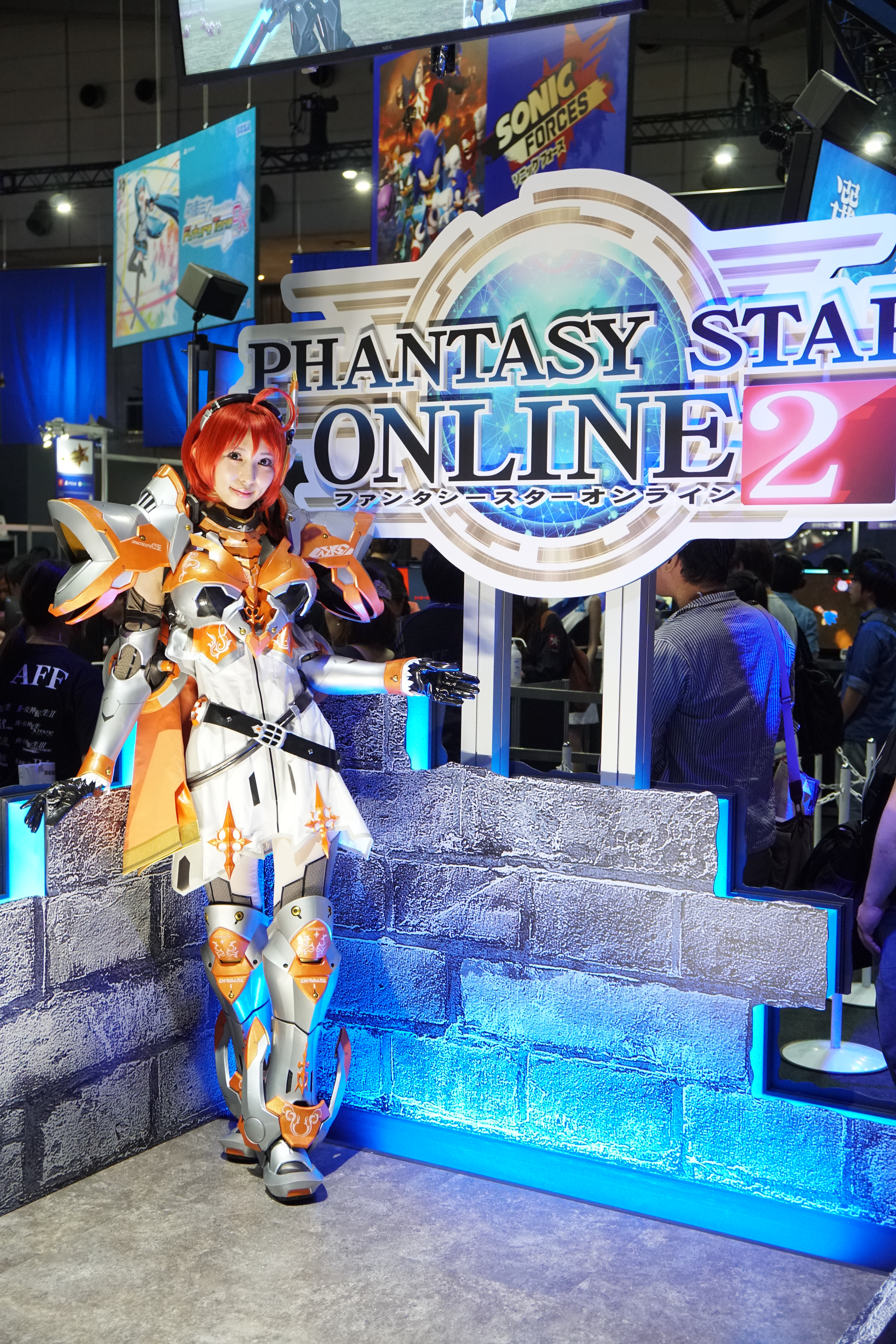
Promotion of Phantasy Star Online 2 at Tokyo Game Show 2017

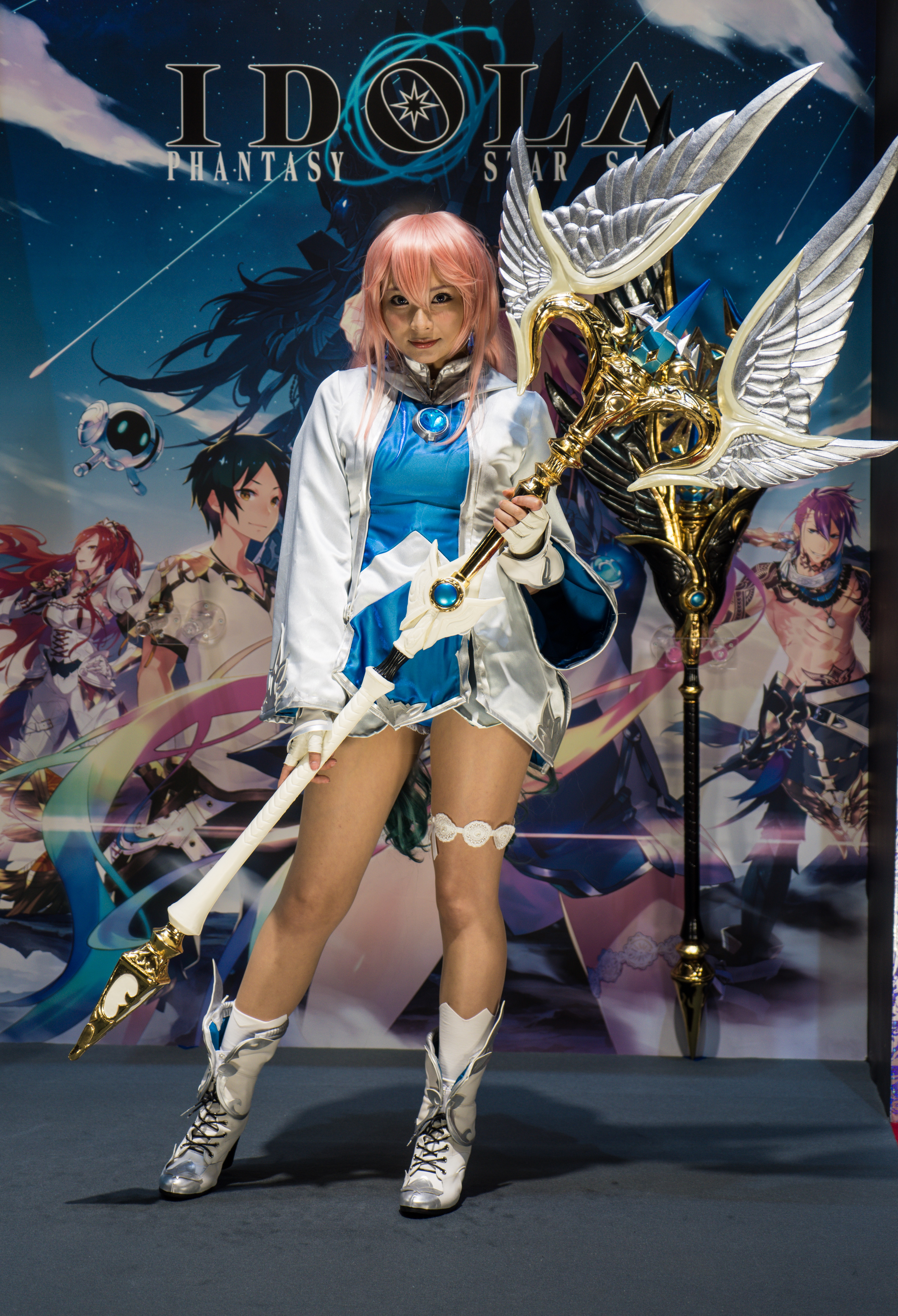
Promotion of Idola Phantasy Star Saga at Tokyo Game Show 2018

- Phantasy Star Online 2 is an action RPG, and the "current" Phantasy Star title. Despite its name, it has no direct ties to Phantasy Star Online any more than the Universe series does. It was first released for Microsoft Windows on July 4, 2012, and later PlayStation Vita and PlayStation 4. A Nintendo Switch version was also released on April 4, 2018. On April 14, 2020, the game launched on Xbox One in North America and therefore was the first time it was released outside Asia. Like the previous games, there are numerous "Episodes" of play areas, enemies, and items; Online 2 is currently in "Episode 6".
  - Phantasy Star Online 2 es is an action RPG for iOS and Android mobile devices. It is a "companion app" for Online 2, as well as a unique game with its own ongoing plot. Data is shared between the two games, and the same player characters are used to play both games.
  - Phantasy Star Online 2 New Genesis is a major update to the original game Phantasy Star Online 2 released on June 9, 2021. SEGA have publicly announced that the players would be able to keep their current account as well as characters cosmetics, outfits, etc. Unfortunately, game progress such as levels, equipments, meseta (in-game currency) will not be able to transfer over to PSO2:NGS. According to official announcement, the update will include an overhaul of the original game engine, and hugely improve the game graphics.

=== Spin-offs of the online series ===
- Phantasy Star Zero is a third-person action RPG developed by Sonic Team exclusively for the Nintendo DS. The game was released in Japan on December 25, 2008, and in North America on November 10, 2009, and has been released in Europe on February 12, 2010. It is a distant sequel to the previous Phantasy Star Online titles, featuring similar gameplay, but was created from the ground up as a Nintendo DS title.
- Phantasy Star Nova is a third-person action RPG developed by tri-Ace exclusively for the PlayStation Vita, released on November 27, 2014, in Japan. It is set in the same universe as other Online 2 titles, and features very similar gameplay to Online 2, but the narrative is not directly related to the events occurring in other games. The game's setting involves the crash landing of an Arks Special Planetary Exploration ship on the planet Machia, and the crew's attempts at survival.
- Idola: Phantasy Star Saga (Note: イドラ ファンタシースターサーガ, Idora Fantashī Sutā Sāga) is free-to-play Japanese role-playing game that was released to mobile devices on November 27, 2018, to celebrate the franchise's 30th anniversary. Unlike other recent Phantasy Star titles, Idola is a turn-based RPG. It is related to Online 2, but even less so than Nova, as it appears to take place in an alternate dimension that certain characters from the other Online 2 titles have entered.

== Universe series ==
=== Phantasy Star Universe ===
- Phantasy Star Universe is an action role-playing game by Sega's Sonic Team for the PC, PlayStation 2, and Xbox 360. It more closely follows the series' new direction as set by Phantasy Star Online, mostly played in a persistent online network mode, but unlike its predecessor, featured a more robust single-player story mode. The game is set in the Gurhal Star System, which consists of three planets, each with its own unique culture and inhabitants. After the "Final Conflict", a war ending 100 years ago, a union was formed between the three planets, leading to the establishment of the Allied Army. During a celebration of the peace accord, a meteor shower facilitates the invasion of the three planets by SEED – a race of strange monsters. The game revolves around Ethan Waber, a member of an elite soldier force called the GUARDIANS, which must rally against the new threat.
  - Phantasy Star Universe: Ambition of the Illuminus is an expansion pack for the main Universe game. In addition to numerous new enemies, items, and areas, it features a new "Episode 2" and "Episode 3" that take place directly after the events of the original Universe (which is essentially "Episode 1").

=== Phantasy Star Portable ===
- Phantasy Star Portable is an action RPG released for the PlayStation Portable in 2008. It is a continuation of the Universe story, taking place shortly after the end of the above-mentioned "Episode 1".
- Phantasy Star Portable 2 is an action RPG for the PlayStation Portable in 2009. It takes place some time after Portable, with new and old Universe characters rising up against a new threat.
  - Phantasy Star Portable 2 Infinity is an updated re-release for Portable 2 featuring the original Phantasy Star Portable 2 campaign ("Episode 1") alongside a new Infinity campaign ("Episode 2"). While an unofficial English translation exists, the game was never released outside of Japan.

With the closure of Phantasy Star Universe servers in 2012, the online-only "Episode 3" can no longer be played at all, and "Episode 2" cannot be played on the Xbox 360 or PC versions. However, Episode 2 is still available through the PlayStation 2 version of Ambition of the Illuminus, which does not require a connection to the Universe servers to play.

== Common elements ==
The plot, setting, and themes of the Phantasy Star series vary dramatically from the franchise's early installments to the multiplayer titles of today. Phantasy Star, Phantasy Star II, and Phantasy Star IV all deal with the concept of evil as a living, sentient entity that takes an active interest in galactic events.

A being known as "Dark Force" or "Dark Falz" (depending on the game) plagues the Algol planetary system every thousand years, resulting in mass destruction and loss of life. It begins its campaign of terror in subtle ways, usually subverting others to its will. Only once its pawn has either been eliminated or is no longer useful does Dark Force ever reveal itself. With each incarnation of Dark Force, a group of protectors arise to suppress it, ushering in a period of recovery and prosperity for the Algol system. This cycle of complacency and destruction continues every millennium. In Phantasy Star IV, the source of this being appears, known as the Profound Darkness.

The original series takes place in the Algol system, with three major planets: Palma, Motavia, and Dezolis. Palma is destroyed during the events of Phantasy Star II, when the prison satellite Gaira crashes into the planet. Several colony ships fled from the disaster, and one of those ships, the Alisa III, is the setting of Phantasy Star III. Other locations within the series include several artificial satellites and Rykros, a planet with an extremely elongated orbit. Phantasy Star Online and Phantasy Star Universe take place in different planetary systems.

Fictional races that re-occur in the series include sentient androids created by humans, called CASTs in the spin-off series and portable games, and Newmans, previously called Numans, elf-like humanoids created by genetically engineering DNA from humans and other, genetically engineered "biomonsters".

== History ==
The original Phantasy Star was released for the Master System in Japan on December 20, 1987. It was one of the earliest cartridges to include battery backed RAM for saving game positions. The game featured 3D maze-like dungeons, which players traversed in a first-person mode. Phantasy Star, along with Dragon Quest, and Final Fantasy, distinguished itself as a pioneer of what came to be defined as console role-playing. The first four games take place in the same universe, as opposed to many RPG series such as Final Fantasy, wherein successive game settings are unrelated, or, at most, superficially related. Each major Phantasy Star game adds onto the series' overall story, culminating in Phantasy Star IV which ties all of the series' plot elements together.

Both Phantasy Star Online and Phantasy Star Universe are their own series based on the original Phantasy Star games. They continue the theme of a persistent game universe, but are set in different planetary systems than the original games.

There is a small misconception that Phantasy Star was created to rival Final Fantasy, due to their similar titles. This is highly unlikely, as the first entries of both series were released within two days of each other.

=== Reception and legacy ===
Games in the Phantasy Star franchise have overall been well received by critics. The original four games in the series are typically regarded as classics for the RPG genre. Upon its initial release, the series was praised for its unique futuristic setting, something that had not been done yet in the genre. In 1996, the series was ranked as the 72nd top game of all time by Next Generation, even as "there really isn't anything especially innovative here - the titles just have good, solid gameplay."

Phantasy Star is recognized as featuring one of the first female lead characters, Alis Landale, alongside Samus Aran of Metroid. It was also one of the first RPGs to feature animated monster encounters, and to allow inter-planetary travel between three planets. The game was inducted into the GameSpy Hall of Fame in 2000. James Fudge of GameSpy said of the game that "everything about Phantasy Star was uncommon, fun, and strange."

Phantasy Star II was considered one of the best role-playing games of its time, and is regarded as "a game of many firsts" according to Nintendo Power. It is regarded by many as the forerunner for certain aspects of role-playing video games, such as an epic, dramatic, character-driven storyline dealing with serious themes and subject matter, and a strategy-based battle system. The game's strong characterization, and use of self-discovery as a motivating factor for the characters and the player, was a major departure from previous RPGs and had a major influence on subsequent RPGs such as the Final Fantasy series.

Phantasy Star III: Generations of Doom featured an innovative and original branching storyline, which spans three generations of characters and can be altered depending on which character the protagonist of each generation marries, leading to four possible endings. Phantasy Star IV: The End of the Millennium introduced the use of pre-programmable combat manoeuvers called 'macros', a means of setting up the player's party AI to deliver custom attack combos.

Nintendo Power's staff has praised the original games, saying that Phantasy Star "was the first RPG to break out of the Dragon Quest / Dungeons & Dragons mold of generic Arthurian fantasy by introducing sci-fi elements. Among its many other accomplishments were the inclusion of characters with actual personalities, the introduction of event scenes, and the presentation of pseudo-3-D dungeons that were a technical marvel at the time." IGN writer Jeremy Conrad stated that "anyone who played video games through the 8 and 16-bit eras would know that name [Phantasy Star]" and called the first four main series games "epic".

Many of the series' games, including Online Episodes I & II and Phantasy Star Zero, have generally favorable scores on Metacritic. Phantasy Star Online in particular is recognized as one of the most "revolutionary new games" of the past decade, for its impact in taking "consoles online" and defining "small-scale multiplayer RPGs," paving the way for larger-scale MMORPG efforts such as Final Fantasy XI, setting the template for small-scale online RPGs such as Capcom's Monster Hunter series and some of the later Dragon Quest and Final Fantasy games, and giving rise to "an entire pantheon of multiplayer dungeon crawlers that continue to dominate the Japanese sales charts." More generally, Phantasy Star Online made "both online gaming and the concept of fee-based services a reality for consoles," paving the way for the online gaming services later provided by all three of the seventh-generation consoles. Phantasy Star Online 2 became a commercial success for Sega as it has made over 900 million dollars since its release in 2012.

== Other media ==
=== Game books ===
- Phantasy Star 1, Phantasy Star 2 and Phantasy Star 3, was adapted by Game Book, title Futabasha Adventure series, authored by Futabasha on 1989–1990 in Japan.
- Phantasy Star Tabletop Roleplaying is a role-playing game published by Skydawn Game Studios in 2025. The game allows players to create and play characters and scenarios set within the worlds of the Phantasy Star franchise. The book contains rules for play, a lore section with a story timeline and setting material, and an overview of the video game series. The game uses material from the original game series (Phantasy Star I-IV), Phantasy Star Adventure, Phantasy Star Gaiden, Phantasy Star Online Episodes I & II and Blue Burst, and Phantasy Star Zero.

=== Manga ===
- Phantasy Star is one of the video games based in the manga titled Game Gag 1P Comic Sega-hen in November 1997 in Japan, published by Shinseisha.
- Phantasy Star Online 2 Episode 0 is a manga based on the video game of same name, published by Kadokawa and artist by Kiyu Kibako, and released by Manga on 2017 in Japan.

=== Other books ===
- The Phantasy Star Compendium is a specialty book published by Sega in late 1995, filled with production art, game development details, and expanded information on the characters, worlds, and lore of the original series. It purported to establish a clear connection between all four games, and elaborate further on the full story of the Algol Solar System. Among the connections it established were identifying Laya and Orakio of Phantasy Star III as rebel leaders in a complex and political struggle between the royal family of Algol, including Alis Landale, and infiltrators from Earth who had taken control of Algol as of Phantasy Star II. Consistent with the series, all paths from the conflict still lead back to Dark Force and its progenitor, the Profound Darkness. As a retroactive effort, the details revealed in the compendium may not have reflected the original intentions for the series, and as such met with resistance from long-time series fans for over-complicating the storyline.

=== Drama ===
- The Phantasy Star Memorial Drama, released in 1995 by Softbank, is a CD featuring music and dialogue to tell a new story about the characters of Phantasy Star IV. Set three years prior to the game's events, it involves Rune Walsh helping Chaz Ashley recall sealed memories of his days as a petty thief. The story revolves around an artificial intelligence called Gene, which in the wake of the Great Collapse, is convinced that humanity is to blame for Algol's troubles, and initiates a number of plans to eliminate them. It also features the "spiritual" return of Nei from Phantasy Star II in a new character of the same name, who helps Chaz stop Gene's sinister ambitions.

=== Anime ===
Two anime series have been created around the Phantasy Star Online 2 world: Phantasy Star Online 2: The Animation, a prequel to that game's "Episode 4" storyline; and Phantasy Star Online 2: Episode Oracle, a retelling of the events of the first three "Episodes" of the game (known as the "Oracle" arc in the game).
