= Random encounter =

Roleplaying game feature

A random encounter is a feature commonly used in various role-playing games whereby combat encounters with non-player character (NPC) enemies or other dangers occur sporadically and at random, usually without the enemy being physically detected beforehand. In general, random encounters are used to simulate the challenges associated with being in a hazardous environment—such as a monster-infested wilderness or dungeon—with uncertain frequency of occurrence and makeup (as opposed to a "placed" encounter). Frequent random encounters are common in Japanese role-playing games like Dragon Quest, Pokémon, and the Final Fantasy series.

== Role-playing games ==
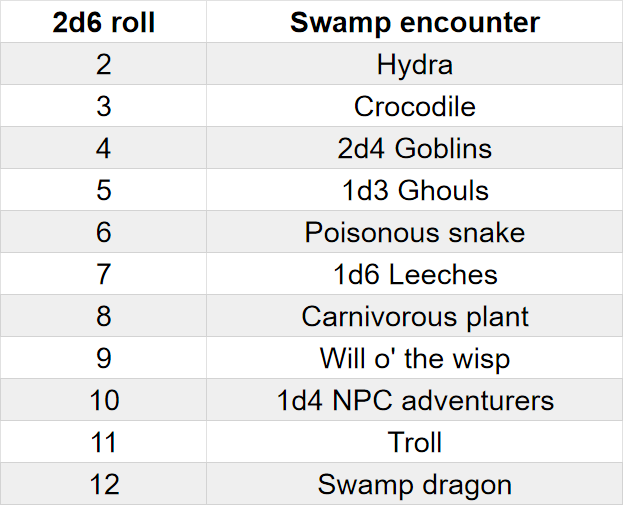
An example random encounter table

Random encounters—sometimes called wandering monsters—were a feature of Dungeons & Dragons from its beginnings in the 1970s, and persist in that game and its offshoots to this day. Random encounters are usually determined by the gamemaster by rolling dice against a random encounter table. The tables are usually based on terrain (and/or time/weather), and have a chance for differing encounters with different numbers or types of creatures. The results may be modified by other tables, such as whether the encounter is friendly, neutral or hostile. GMs are often encouraged to make their own tables. Specific adventures often have specific tables for locations, like a temple's hallways.

Wandering monsters are often used to wear down player characters and force them to use up consumable resources, such as hit points, magic spells and healing potions, as a way of punishing them for spending too much time in a dangerous area.

== Video games ==
Random encounters were incorporated into early role-playing video games and have been common throughout the genre. Placed and random encounters were both used in 1981s Wizardry and by the mid-1980s, random encounters made up the bulk of battles in genre-defining games such as Dragon Quest, Final Fantasy, and The Bard's Tale. Random encounters happen when the player is traversing the game world (often through the use of a "world map" or overworld). Most often, the player encounters enemies to battle, but occasionally friendly or neutral characters can appear, with whom the player might interact differently than with enemies. Random encounters are random in the respect that players cannot anticipate the exact moment of encounter or what will be encountered, as the occurrence of the event is based on factors such as programmed probabilities; Pseudo-random number generators create the sequence of numbers used to determine if an encounter will happen. The form and frequency can vary depending on a number of factors, such as where the player is located in the game world and the statistics of the player character. In some games, items can be found to increase or decrease the frequency of random encounters, even to eliminate them outright, or increase the odds of having a particular encounter.

Random encounters often occur more frequently in dungeons, caves, forests, deserts, and swamps than in open plains. The simplest sort of random encounter algorithm would be as follows:

1. Each step, set X to a random integer between 0 and 99.
2. If in plains, and X < 8, a random encounter occurs.
3. If in swamp, desert, or forest, and X < 16, a random encounter occurs.

The problem with this algorithm is that random encounters occur "too" randomly for the tastes of most players, as there will be "droughts" and "floods" in their distribution. Random encounters in rapid succession are considered undesirable as they lead to the player's perception of getting "bogged down", but with the simple algorithm, it is possible to have an encounter from taking only one step after an encounter. The early games in the Dragon Quest series, for example, allow random encounters to occur one step after the other. A more elaborate random encounter algorithm (and similar to those used in many games) would be the following:

1. Set X to a random integer between 64 and 255.
2. For each step in plains, decrement X by 4. For each step in forest, swamp, or desert, decrement X by 8.
3. When X < 0, a fight ensues. Go to step 1.

This ensures that, in any terrain, the player will not experience more than one random encounter every eight steps. A game with this type of system can sometimes be taken advantage of by initiating some action that will reset the counter (pausing, opening a menu, saving), especially when using an emulator. This is a popular trick in speedruns to skip time-consuming or dangerous battles or it can be used to ensure that each battle results in a rare or valuable encounter.

Random encounters have become less popular in video games with the passage of time, as gamers often complain that they are annoying, repetitive or discouraging to exploration. The Final Fantasy and Tales series have abandoned random encounter systems with successive games, while relatively newer franchises such as the Chrono series and Kingdom Hearts have never used them.

A more commonly used tactic in later RPGs (used in Final Fantasy XII, Radiata Stories, Fallout and Fallout 2 (although the Fallout games have unlimited random encounters on the world map)), like Legend of Legaia and all Kingdom Hearts games have a finite number of enemies in a given area. This cuts down on grinding and does not discourage exploration to the same extent. A similar approach is spawning, where visible monsters always (re)appear at the same location, as seen in Chrono Trigger and most of Dragon Quest IX. Both approaches give players the opportunity to anticipate, evade, or select encounters.
