= Big Comic Spirits =

Japanese manga magazine

- Cover of the June 25, 2007 issue, featuring model Aki Hoshino
- Former editors: Takashi Nagasaki
- Categories: Seinen manga
- Frequency: Weekly
- Circulation: 41,091; (July–September 2026)
- First issue: October 14, 1980
- Company: Shogakukan
- Country: Japan
- Based in: Tokyo
- Language: Japanese
- Website: bigcomicbros.net/spirits/

Big Comic Spirits (Japanese: ビッグコミックスピリッツ, Hepburn: Biggu Komikku Supirittsu) is a weekly Japanese seinen manga magazine published by Shogakukan. The first issue was published on October 14, 1980. Food, sports, romance and business are recurring themes in the magazine, and the stories often question conventional values. Photos of gravure idols are typically featured on the front cover and first few pages of each issue. The magazine is published every Monday. Circulation in 2008 averaged over 300,000 copies, but by 2015 had dropped to 168,250. In 2009, Shogakukan launched a sister magazine, Monthly Big Comic Spirits.

== History ==
Big Comic Spirits launched on October 14, 1980, as a monthly magazine. The following June, it changed to a semimonthly magazine published on the 15th and 30th days of each month. Beginning in April 1986, the magazine became weekly, with new issues published every Monday.

== Currently running manga series ==
Title	Author/Artist	Premiered
Alice, All the Way to Outer Space (ありす、宇宙(どこ)までも, Arisu, Doko Made mo)	Kiko Urino	June 2024
Aoashi Brotherfoot (アオアシ ブラザーフット, Aoashi Burazāfutto)	Yūgo Kobayashi	July 2021
Asadora! (連続漫画小説 あさドラ!, Renzoku Manga Shōsetsu Asadora!)	Naoki Urasawa	October 2018 (Note: On hiatus)
Bōkyaku no Sachiko (忘却のサチコ)	Jun Abe	August 2014
Dance Dance Danseur (ダンス・ダンス・ダンスール, Dansu Dansu Dansūru)	George Asakura	September 2015
Dragon Jam	Itsunari Fuji	May 2011 (Note: Moved from Monthly Big Comic Spirits; on hiatus)
Ekiden Danshi Project (駅伝男子プロジェクト)	Shin Takahashi	May 2022
Fuuto PI (風都探偵, Fūto Tantei)	Riku Sanjo (story) and Masaki Satou (art)	August 2017
Ganbaryonkā, Masako-chan (がんばりょんかぁ、マサコちゃん)	Masaru Miyazaki (story) and Osamu Uoto (art)	January 2022
Haibaiyōshi Mizuiro (胚培養士ミズイロ)	Mari Okazaki	October 2022
Heaven no Tenbin (ヘブンの天秤)	Ruru Jōdo	June 2022
Ikiteru Uchi ni Oshite Kure (生きてるうちに推してくれ)	Niwa Tanba	August 2022
Kenkō de Bunkateki na Saitei Gendo no Seikatsu (健康で文化的な最低限度の生活)	Haruko Kashiwagi	March 2014
Kimagure Konseputo (気まぐれコンセプト)	Hoichoi Productions	October 1981
Koi to Kokkai (恋と国会)	Keiko Nishi	November 2018
Kūneru Maruta Nūbo (くーねるまるた ぬーぼ)	Jingu Takao	February 2018
Sins of Kujo (九条の大罪, Kujō no Taizai)	Shohei Manabe	October 2020
Mushoku no Gakkō: Shokugyō Kunrenkō de no 200-kakan (無職の学校～職業訓練校での200日間～)	Seike Takaharu	March 2022
Mogura no Uta (土竜の唄)	Noboru Takahashi	September 2008 (Note: Moved from Weekly Young Sunday)
My Home Afro Tanaka (マイホーム アフロ田中, Mai Hōmu Afuro Tanaka)	Masaharu Noritsuke	October 2022
Oishinbo (美味しんぼ)	Tetsu Kariya and Akira Hanasaki	October 1983
Ōjōgiwa no Imi o Shire! (往生際の意味を知れ!)	Kyo Yoneshiro	February 2020
Owakare Hospital (お別れホスピタル, Owakare Hosupitaru)	Bakka Okita	December 2017
Roppen (ROPPEN-六篇-)	Akira Miyashita	December 2022
Shinkurō, Hashiru! (新九郎、奔る!)	Masami Yuki	January 2020 (Note: Moved from Monthly Big Comic Spirits)
Shokubutsu Byōrigaku wa Ashita no Kimi o Negau (植物病理学は明日の君を願う)	Minoru Takeyoshi	September 2022
Sukoshi Dake Ikikaeru (すこしだけ生き返る)	Fumi Usukura	October 2022
Uranaishi Hoshiko (占い師星子)	Mimico Misaki	April 2023
Yumenashi Sensei no Shinro Shidō (夢なし先生の進路指導)	Masaki Kasahara	April 2023

== Finished series ==
=== 1980s ===
- Bokkemon by Takashi Iwashige (1980–1985; moved from Big Comic)
- Maison Ikkoku by Rumiko Takahashi (1980–1987)
- Wounded Man by Ryoichi Ikegami and Kazuo Koike (1982–1986)
- My Name Is Shingo by Kazuo Umezu (1982–1986)
- Ruri Iro Generation by Kimio Yanagisawa (1983–1986)
- Iron Virgin Jun by Go Nagai (1983)
- Paparinko Monogatari by Hisashi Eguchi (1985–1986)
- Koji En by Koji Aihara (1985–1988)
- F by Noboru Rokuda (1986–1992)
- Crying Freeman by Ryoichi Ikegami and Kazuo Koike (1986–1988)
- Yawara! by Naoki Urasawa (1986–1993)
- Tokyo Love Story by Fumi Saimon (1988–1990)
- Dance till Tomorrow by Naoki Yamamoto (1989–1990)
- Ryōgoku Oshare Tōshi by Reiko Okano (1989–1990)
- Utsurun Desu by Sensha Yoshida (1989–1994)
- Even a Monkey Can Draw Manga by Kentaro Takekuma and Koji Aihara (1990–1991)

=== 1990s ===
- Fourteen by Kazuo Umezu (1990–1995)
- Wangan Midnight by Michiharu Kusunoki (1990) (transferred to Kodansha's Weekly Young Magazine)
- Hanaotoko by Taiyō Matsumoto (1991–1992)
- Yattarou Jan!! by Hidenori Hara (1991–1996)
- Boys of Summer by Norifusa Mita (1992)
- Gallery Fake by Fujihiko Hosono (1992–2005, 2012, 2016)
- Asunaro Hakusho by Fumi Saimon (1992–1993)
- Tokyo Daigaku Monogatari by Tatsuya Egawa (1992–2001)
- Ii Hito by Shin Takahashi (1993–1999)
- Tekkonkinkreet by Taiyō Matsumoto (1993–1994)
- Happy! by Naoki Urasawa (1993–1999)
- Henshū Ō by Seiki Tsuchida (1993–1997)
- Arigatō by Naoki Yamamoto (1994–1995)
- Itoshi no Irene by Hideki Arai (1995–1996)
- Ping Pong by Taiyō Matsumoto (1996–1997)
- Tanabata no Kuni by Hitoshi Iwaaki (1996–1999)
- Yoiko by Yūgo Ishikawa (1996–2001)
- Aozora by Hidenori Hara (1998–2002)
- Uzumaki by Junji Ito (1998–1999)
- Believers by Naoki Yamamoto (1999)
- 20th Century Boys by Naoki Urasawa (1999–2006)
- Chocolat by Eisaku Kubonouchi (1999–2003)
- Subaru by Masahito Soda (1999–2002)
- Saikano by Shin Takahashi (1999–2001)

=== 2000s ===
- 8 by Atsushi Kamijo (2000–2003)
- Gyo by Junji Ito (2001–2002)
- Kōkō Afro Tanaka by Masaharu Noritsuke (2001–2004)
- Pet by Ranjō Miyake (2002–2003)
- Homunculus by Hideo Yamamoto (2003–2011)
- Danchi Tomoo by Tobira Oda (2003–2019)
- Last Inning by Ryū Kamio (story) and Yū Nakahara (art) (2004–2014)
- Ushijima the Loan Shark by Shohei Manabe (2004–2019)
- Waga Na wa Umishi by Yoichi Komori (story) and Yuji Takemura (2004–2007)
- Chūtai Afro Tanaka by Masaharu Noritsuke (2004–2007)
- Sekido by Yasuhito Yamamoto (2004–2006)
- Bambino! by Tetsuya Sekiya (2004–2009)
- Hakuba no Ōji-sama by Yukizō Saku (2005–2008)
- Boys on the Run by Kengo Hanazawa (2005–2008)
- Nihon Chinbotsu by Sakyo Komatsu (original work) and Tokihiko Ishiki (art) (2006–2008)
- Momonchi by Kei Toume (2006–2009)
- Takemitsuzamurai by Issei Eifuku (story) and Taiyō Matsumoto (2006–2010)
- Teiō by Ryo Kurashina and Taro Sekiguchi (2006–2008)
- Jagan wa Gachirin ni Tobu by Kazuhiro Fujita (2006–2007)
- Animal Joe by Tooru Fujisawa (2006–2008)
- 21st Century Boys by Naoki Urasawa (2006–2007)
- Shin Black Jack ni Yoroshiku by Shūhō Satō (2007–2010)
- Jōkyō Afro Tanaka by Masaharu Noritsuke (2007–2010)
- Moon: Subaru Solitude Standing by Masahito Soda (2007–2011)
- Hana to Oku-tan by Shin Takahashi (2007–2019)
- Channel wa Sonomama! by Noriko Sasaki (2008–2013)
- Misaki, Number 1!! by Masato Fujisaki (2008–2011)
- Coconut Period by Reiji Yamada (2008–2009)
- Undead by Kazurou Inoue (2008)
- Birdy the Mighty / Birdy the Mighty: Evolution by Masami Yuki (2008–2012; moved from Weekly Young Sunday)
- Ikigami: The Ultimate Limit by Motoro Mase (2008–2012; moved from Weekly Young Sunday)
- Shin Kurosagi by Takeshi Natsuhara (story) and Kuromaru (art) (2008–2012; moved from Weekly Young Sunday)
- Tomehane! Suzuri Kōkō Shodōbu by Katsutoshi Kawai (2008–2015; moved from Weekly Young Sunday)
- Goodnight Punpun by Inio Asano (2008–2013; moved from Weekly Young Sunday)
- Shut Hell by Yu Itō (2008–2010; moved to Monthly Big Comic Spirits)
- D no Maō by Kayoko Shimotsuki (2009; moved to Monthly Big Comic Spirits)
- Bambino! Secondo by Tetsuya Sekiya (2009–2012)
- I Am a Hero by Kengo Hanazawa (2009–2017)
- Rainbow: Nisha Rokubō no Shichinin by George Abe (story) and Masasumi Kakizaki (2009–2010; moved from Weekly Young Sunday)
- Seven Shakespeares by Harold Sakuishi (2009–2011)

=== 2010s ===
- Sasurai Afro Tanaka by Masaharu Noritsuke (2010–2013)
- Hideout by Masasumi Kakizaki (2010)
- Ushiharu by Yukiko Gotō (2010–2011; moved from Monthly Big Comic Spirits)
- Shichigatsu no Hone by Satoshi Yoshida (2010–2011; moved to Monthly Big Comic Spirits)
- Asahinagu by Ai Kozaki (2011–2020)
- Hanamote Katare by Yukio Katayama (story), Momoji Higashi (cooperation), and Yukio Katayama (art) (2012–2014; moved from Monthly Big Comic Spirits)
- Shin Kurosagi: Kanketsu-hen by Takeshi Natsuhara (story) and Kuromaru (art) (2012–2013)
- Chiisakobee by Minetarō Mochizuki (2012–2015)
- Ōsama-tachi no Viking by Sadayasu (story and art) and Makoto Fukami (collaboration) (2013–2019)
- Hakubo no Chronicle by Masami Yuki (2013–2017)
- Yūzora no Cruyffism by Kazunori Tahara (2013–2016)
- Dead Dead Demon's Dededede Destruction by Inio Asano (2014–2022)
- 1518! by Yu Aida (2014–2019)
- Ginkai no Speed Star by Michiharu Kusunoki (2014–2015)
- Tokusatsu Gagaga by Niwa Tanaba (2014–2020)
- Kedamame by Yukio Tamai (2014–2015)
- Joker Game by Kayoko Shimotsuki (2014–2015)
- Hikari-Man by Hideo Yamamoto (2014–2020)
- Furo Girl! by Yukio Katayama (2015–2016)
- Million Yen Women by Shunju Aono (2015–2016)
- Shiawase Afro Tanaka by Masaharu Noritsuke (2015–2018)
- Aoashi by Yugo Kobayashi (2015–2025)
- Kanata-Kakeru by Shin Takahashi (2016–2018)
- After the Rain by Jun Mayuzuki (2016–2018; moved from Monthly Big Comic Spirits)
- Neko no Otera no Chion-san by Makoto Ojiro (2016–2018)
- Tenohira ni Ai o! by Kōji Murata (2016–2017)
- Slow Motion o Mōichido by Rie Kano (2016–2018)
- Saotome Senshu, Hitakakusu by Naoki Mizuguchi (2016–2019)
- Jagaaan by Muneyuki Kaneshiro and Nishida Kensuke (2017–2021)
- Nigatsu no Shōsha by Shiho Takase (2017–2024)
- Yukibana no Tora by Akiko Higashimura (2018–2020; moved from Hibana)
- Peach Milk Crown by Kazunori Tahara (2018–2019)
- Kekkon Afro Tanaka by Masaharu Noritsuke (2018–2021)
- Saturn Return by Akane Torikai (2019–2022)
- Ponkotsu Ponko by Keita Yatera (2019–2021)
- Battleground Workers by Minoru Takeyoshi (2019–2021)
- Insomniacs After School by Makoto Ojiro (2019–2023)
- Mingo: Italia-jin ga Minna Moteru to Omou na yo by Peppe (2019–2020)
- Run on Your New Legs by Wataru Midori (2019–2020)
- Bushi-Stant Aisaka-kun! by Nobuo Yokoyama (2019–2021)

=== 2020s ===
- Ano Tsuki ni Mukatte Ute! (あの月に向かって打て!) by Kazuyuki Samukawa (2020–2021)
- Ōjōgiwa no Imi o Shire! by Kyo Yoneshiro (2020–2023)
- 365 Days to the Wedding by Tamiki Wakaki (2020–2023)
- Orb: On the Movements of the Earth by Uoto (2020–2022)
- Platanus no Mi by Toshiya Higashimoto (2020–2023)
- Hirayasumi by Keigo Shinzō (2021–2026)
- Watashi no Musuko ga Isekai Tensei Shitappoi Full Ver. by Kanemoto (story) and Hikari Shibata (art) (2021–2022)
- 15-Bu no Shoujotachi: Idol no Tsukurikata (15分の少女たち－アイドルのつくりかた－) by Kappi (story) and Rie Toi (art) (2021–2023)
- Otona no Zukan Kaiteiban (おとなのずかん改訂版) by Kei Itoi (2021–2023)
- Re Cervin by Kōsuke Hamada (2022–2026)
- Maō ga Zutto Mite Iru (魔王がずっと見ている) by Hiroshi Noda (story) and Masayasu Fukushima (art) (2022–2023)
- Akane no Ne (アカネノネ) by Eriko Yada (2022–2024) (Note: Originally titled Akaneiro no Composer (茜色のコンポーザー) and serialized in Monthly Big Comic Spirits from March to May 2022.)
- Kurosagi Sakidō: 18-sai Shinseijin Sagi Hanzan-hen by Takeshi Natsuhara (story) and Kuromaru (art) (2022)
- Komegura Fūfu no Recipe-chō (米蔵夫婦のレシピ帳, Komegura Fūfu no Reshipi-chō) by Yukio Katayama (2022–2024)
- Muta no Aru Seikatsu (無田のある生活) by Sho Asahina (2022–2024)
- Hana Ikeru: Kawakita Kōkō Kadōbu (ハナイケル-川北高校華道部-) by Hamachi Yamada (2023–2024)
- This World Is Worth Fighting For by Hatsumi Kodama (2023–2025)
- Robō no Fujii by Kurao Nabe (2023–2026)
