= Smuggler (manga) =

Japanese manga series

- Tankōbon volume cover

スマグラー (Sumagurā)
- Genre: Crime; Suspense
- Manga
- Written by: Shohei Manabe
- Published by: Kodansha
- English publisher: NA: Tokyopop (expired); One Peace Books
- Imprint: Afternoon KC
- Magazine: Monthly Afternoon
- Original run: March 24, 2000 – June 24, 2000
- Volumes: 1
- Live-action film

Smuggler: Omae no Mirai o Hakobe
- Directed by: Katsuhito Ishii
- Written by: Katsuhito Ishii; Masatoshi Yamaguchi; Kensuke Yamamoto
- Music by: Toshiro Nakagawa; Tatsuo Yamaguchi
- Studio: Django Films; Grasshoppa; Warner Bros. Pictures
- Licensed by: Funimation
- Released: September 16, 2011 (TIFF); October 22, 2011 (Japan)
- Runtime: 114 minutes
- Box office: $1.5 million
- icon

Smuggler (Japanese: スマグラー, Hepburn: Sumagurā; stylized in all caps) is a Japanese manga series written and illustrated by Shohei Manabe. It was serialized in Kodansha's seinen manga magazine Monthly Afternoon from March to June 2000, and published in a single volume. It was licensed in North America by Tokyopop, then by One Peace Books. A live-action film adaptation was released in 2011.

== Development ==
Manabe took inspiration from the works of filmmaker Quentin Tarantino in the making of the series.

== Media ==
=== Manga ===
Written and illustrated by Shohei Manabe, the series was serialized in Kodansha's seinen manga magazine Monthly Afternoon from March 24, 2000, (Note: Debuted in the magazine's May 2000 issue.) to June 24, 2000. (Note: Finished in the magazine's August 2000 issue.) Its chapters were collected into a single tankōbon volume, released on August 23, 2000. A one-shot prequel by Manabe was released in Monthly Afternoon on August 25, 2011. A shinsōban volume combining the original volume's chapters and the one-shot was released on September 23, 2011, ahead of the film's release.

In August 2005, Tokyopop announced that they licensed the series for English publication. One volume was published on January 10, 2006. After Tokyopop ceased publishing the series, it was licensed by One Peace Books in March 2013, with a new version of the English volume released on December 15.

==== Chapter list ====
No.	Original release date	Original ISBN	English release date	English ISBN
1	August 23, 2000	978-4-06-314249-5	January 10, 2006	978-1-59532-150-3
1. "The Transporter" (運送屋, Unsō-ya); 2. "Spine and Gut" ("背骨"と"内臓", "Sebone" to "Naizō"); 3. "Back of a Truck" (荷台, Nidai); 4. "Preparation" (覚悟, Kakugo)

=== Film ===
A live-action film adaptation was announced in October 2010. Titled Smuggler: Omae no Mirai o Hakobe (スマグラー おまえの未来を運べ; 'Smuggler: Carry Your Own Future'), it was directed by Katsuhito Ishii and stars Satoshi Tsumabuki as Ryosuke Kinuta. It made its official premiere at the 2011 Toronto International Film Festival on September 16, 2011, in the event's Midnight Madness program. The film was later released to theatres in Japan on October 22, 2011. It opened at No. 7 in the box office, making US$636,243 in 184 theaters. It went on to gross $1,502,434 in Japan.

Ahead of the film's release, a four-part spin-off drama for mobile devices was released on October 7, 2011. Titled Smuggler: Omae no Yaku wa Dore? (スマグラー おまえの役はどれ?; 'Smuggler: What's Your Role?'), it was directed by Masatoshi Yamaguchi and distributed by LISMO Drama, with Satoshi Tsumabuki, Masatoshi Nagase, and Tatsuya Gashuin reprising their cast roles. It takes place before the events of the film.

In March 2012, Cinema Asia Releasing announced that they licensed the film for international distribution. However, in January 2014 Funimation and Giant Ape Media announced that they licensed the film. They released the film on DVD on April 1, 2014.

== Reception ==
Ken Haley from Pop Culture Shock praised the story and characters, though felt the art in the early portion of the series was ugly and amateurish. In Manga: The Complete Guide, writer Jason Thompson praised the artwork as realistic and the story as "well-written [and] tightly plotted".
