= Tokusatsu Gagaga =

Japanese manga series by Niwa Tanaba

- First tankōbon volume cover

トクサツガガガ
- Genre: Office comedy
- Manga
- Written by: Niwa Tanaba
- Published by: Shogakukan
- Magazine: Weekly Big Comic Spirits
- Original run: August 11, 2014 – May 11, 2020
- Volumes: 20
- Television drama
- Directed by: Hajime Suenaga; Shinzo Nitta
- Produced by: Sho Yoshinaga
- Written by: Shigenori Tanabe
- Music by: Akio Izutsu
- Original network: NHK General TV
- Original run: January 18, 2019 – March 1, 2019
- Episodes: 7

Tokusatsu Gagaga (トクサツガガガ; "Gaga for Tokusatsu") is a Japanese manga series written and illustrated by Niwa Tanaba. It was serialized in Shogakukan's seinen manga magazine Weekly Big Comic Spirits from August 2014 to May 2020, with its chapters collected in 20 tankōbon volumes.

== Media ==
=== Manga ===
Written and illustrated by Niwa Tanaba, Tokusatsu Gagaga was serialized in Shogakukan's seinen manga magazine Weekly Big Comic Spirits from August 11, 2014, to May 11, 2020. Shogakukan collected its chapters in twenty tankōbon volumes, released from November 28, 2014, to August 28, 2020.

==== Volumes ====
No.	Japanese release date	Japanese ISBN
1	November 28, 2014	978-4-09-186606-6
2	March 30, 2015	978-4-09-186810-7
3	June 30, 2015	978-4-09-187060-5
4	September 30, 2015	978-4-09-187217-3
5	December 28, 2015	978-4-09-187363-7
6	March 30, 2016	978-4-09-187516-7
7	June 30, 2016	978-4-09-187638-6
8	September 30, 2016	978-4-09-187784-0
9	January 30, 2017	978-4-09-189259-1
10	May 30, 2017	978-4-09-189512-7
11	September 29, 2017	978-4-09-189645-2
12	January 30, 2018	978-4-09-189783-1
13	May 30, 2018	978-4-09-189880-7
14	September 28, 2018	978-4-09-860076-2
15	January 30, 2019	978-4-09-860207-0
16	May 30, 2019	978-4-09-860287-2
17	September 30, 2019	978-4-09-860408-1
18	January 30, 2020	978-4-09-860528-6
19	May 29, 2020	978-4-09-860620-7
20	August 28, 2020	978-4-09-860711-2; 978-4-09-943069-6 (LE)

=== Drama ===
A 7-episode Japanese television drama series adaptation, starring Fuka Koshiba as Kano Nakamura, was broadcast on NHK General TV from January 18 to March 1, 2019.

== Reception ==
Tokusatsu Gagaga ranked 17th on Takarajimasha's Kono Manga ga Sugoi! guidebook list of 2016 top manga series for male readers. Tokusatsu Gagaga ranked 15th on the "Nationwide Bookstore Employees' Recommended Comics" by the Honya Club website in 2016. The manga was nominated for the 21st Tezuka Osamu Cultural Prize in 2017. In 2019, on Da Vinci's magazine 18th annual "Book of the Year" list, Tokusatsu Gagaga ranked 29th.
