= Dash Kappei =

Sports manga series

- Cover of the first manga volume

ダッシュ勝平
- Genre: Sports
- Manga
- Written by: Noboru Rokuda
- Published by: Shogakukan
- Imprint: Shōnen Sunday Comics
- Magazine: Weekly Shōnen Sunday
- Original run: 1979 – 1982
- Volumes: 17
- Anime television series
- Directed by: Masayuki Hayashi (chief); Seitaro Hara (chief)
- Produced by: Tomoyuki Miyata; Hajime Taniguchi; Katsuhiro Nakano
- Written by: Shigeru Yanagawa
- Music by: Koba Hayashi
- Studio: Tatsunoko Production
- Original network: FNS (Fuji TV)
- Original run: October 4, 1981 – December 26, 1982
- Episodes: 65

Dash Kappei (ダッシュ勝平) is a Japanese sports manga series written and illustrated by Noboru Rokuda and first published in 1979 in Weekly Shōnen Sunday. The manga had 158 chapters.

The manga was also adapted into a 65-episode anime television series by Tatsunoko Production in 1981, chiefly directed by Masayuki Hayashi and Seitaro Hara. The anime was aired across Japan on Fuji Television and its affiliates from 4 October 1981 to 26 December 1982.

== Story ==
The hero of the story is a teenage boy named Kappei Sakamoto, who is a high school student with amazing athletic abilities who joins the basketball team of Seirin High School and quickly becomes one of the most skilled players. Kappei has one unusual handicap for a basketball player - his height; he stands not even one meter tall. His Achilles' heel is female undergarments; he has a particular interest in white undergarments, and is even more enthusiastic about joining the basketball team when he discovers that the team's female coach, Coach Natsu, wears white undergarments (although his inventive attempts to sneak a peek at said undergarments usually result in a physical beatdown from the hot-tempered coach). Eventually, Kappei's athletic prowess extends beyond basketball, and he tries out for - and excels at - every sport the school offers.

In the first episode, Kappei meets and becomes enamored with Akane Aki, a sweet, pretty girl who is quite athletic herself (she later joins the school's ping-pong team) and signs on as assistant coach of Seirin's basketball team. Much to Kappei's delight, not only is Akane pretty, but she also wears white undergarments, and Kappei sets his sights on winning her heart. Kappei eventually moves in with Akane and her family after his parents (who are rarely around) leave for the United States. However, Kappei has an unusual rival for Akane's heart - Akane's dog, Seiichiro, who has often fantasized about marrying his owner and, resenting Kappei, immediately seeks to sabotage his relationship with Akane through various tricks. Seiichiro can also speak, although only Kappei can understand him.

== Characters ==
Kappei Sakamoto (坂本 勝平, Sakamoto Kappei)
Voiced by: Mayumi Tanaka
The protagonist of the story who not only excels in basketball, he also excels in every sport and loves to be in the spotlight, especially when he is admired by the girls. He is obsessed with women's white undergarments, for him a "symbol of purity". He falls in love with Akane, and wants to marry her.
Akane Aki (秋 あかね, Aki Akane)
Voiced by: Mizuho Tsushima
Akane is a transfer student to Seirin High, becomes the assistant coach of the school's basketball team. She befriends Kappei and is a strong believer in his talents, and though she initially finds him rather strange, soon develops feelings for him, and even shows signs of jealousy when Kappei shows interest in other girls.
Seiichiro (诚一郎)
Voiced by: Toru Ohira
Akane's dog, who can walk and speak like a human being, although only Kappei can understand his speech. He is also enamored of Akane and dreams of marrying her (despite the fact that she is human and he a dog) and, resenting Kappei's muscling his way into her life, becomes Kappei's sworn enemy, but also his best friend. He often appears in brief entr'actes to explain the rules of whatever sport Kappei happens to be playing at that time.
Kaori Natsu (夏 かおり, Natsu Kaori)
Voiced by: Kazue Komiya
The basketball team's hot-tempered coach. Though she tries to be a proper young lady and is on the hunt for a boyfriend, she loses patience easily (especially with Kappei) and is well known for her grotesque and humorous facial expressions when angered.
Kaoru Tachibana (立花かおる, Tachibana Kaoru)
Voiced by: Kazuhiko Inoue
Captain of the basketball team.
Kyōshirō Nemuri (狂四郎, Kyōshirō)
Voiced by: Kazuyuki Sogabe
A member of the basketball team.
Daiba
Voiced by: Akira Murayama
A member of a rival basketball team. He stands nearly two meters tall, and is a giant in every sense of the term. He is also Akane's ex-boyfriend; Akane broke up with him because of his violent temper, and now he wants to discredit Kappei and win her back.
Mr. Okazaki
Voiced by: Hiroshi Masuoka
Kappei and Akane's homeroom teacher.

== Episodes ==
No.	Title	Directed by	Written by	Animation directed by	Original release date
1	"Pure White! The Basketball Star" "Junpaku Pikari! Basuke no Hoshi" (Japanese: 純白ピカリ! バスケの星)	Masayuki Hayashi	Yū Yamamoto	Tsuneo Ninomiya	October 4, 1981
2	"Akane's Shoot, The Secret Technique!" "Higi Akane Shoot Da!" (Japanese: 秘技アカネシュートだ!)	Directed by : Shohei Ishida; Storyboarded by : Katsumi Endō	Haruya Yamazaki	Shizuo Kawai	October 11, 1981
3	"Spark of Love? Between Dog and Human" "Koi no Hibana? Inu tai Ningen" (Japanese: 恋の火花? 犬対人間)	Directed by : Yutaka Kagawa; Storyboarded by : Shinya Sadamitsu	Takao Koyama	Juuji Mizumura	October 18, 1981
4	"You Make me Unsteady, The Ball Sways" "Kimi ni Furafura Kyū wa Yurayura" (Japanese: 君にフラフラ球はユラユラ)	Directed by : Yoshizo Tsuda; Storyboarded by : Tomoyasu Masago	Haruya Yamazaki	Shizuo Kawai	October 25, 1981
5	"Kappei the All-Rounder Athlete?" "Katsuhei no Supōtsu Ban'nō Senshu?" (Japanese: 勝平のスポーツ万能選手?)	Directed by : Minoru Akitsu; Storyboarded by : Shinya Sadamitsu	Yū Yamamoto	Akio Sakai	November 1, 1981
6	"Terrifying Aerial Basketball!" "Kyōfu no Kūchū Basuke!" (Japanese: 恐怖の空中バスケ!)	Directed by : Masayuki Hayashi & Yutaka Kagawa; Storyboarded by : Aritoki Sugiyama	Haruya Yamazaki	Takashi Saijō	November 8, 1981
7	"Seiichiro's Guaranteed Strategy for Love" "Seiichirō no Rennai Hisshō-hō" (Japanese: 誠一郎の恋愛必勝法)	Directed by : Minoru Akitsu; Storyboarded by : Shinya Sadamitsu	Takeshi Shudo	Akio Sakai	November 15, 1981
8	"Nightmarish Love Square Mansion" "Akumu no Shikaku Kankei Marason" (Japanese: 悪夢の四角関係マラソン)	Yoshizo Tsuda	Takao Koyama	Juuji Mizumura & Takashi Saijō	November 22, 1981
9	"Formidable Naismith Academy" "Osorubeki Neisumisu Gakuen" (Japanese: おそるべきネイスミス学園)	Directed by : Yutaka Kagawa; Storyboarded by : Aritoki Sugiyama	Yū Yamamoto	Shizuo Kawai	November 29, 1981
10	"Rival Todo-kun Appears!" "Raibaru Tōdō-kun Shutsugen!" (Japanese: ライバル藤堂くん出現!)	Directed by : Minoru Akitsu; Storyboarded by : Shinya Sadamitsu	Haruya Yamazaki	Akio Sakai	December 6, 1981
11	"Kappei's Impossible Cheating" "Kappei Murimuri Kanningu" (Japanese: 勝平ムリムリカンニング)	Directed by : Masayuki Hayashi; Storyboarded by : Katsumi Endō	Takeshi Shudo	Shizuo Kawai	December 13, 1981
12	"Daiba's Killer Shot!" "Daiba no Satsujin Shūto!" (Japanese: 大場の殺人シュート!)	Directed by : Minoru Akitsu; Storyboarded by : Shinya Sadamitsu	Haruya Yamazaki	Akio Sakai	December 20, 1981
13	"Mysterious! Basketball Ghost vs Kappei" "Kaiki! Basuke Yūrei tai Kappei" (Japanese: 怪奇! バスケ幽霊対勝平)	Yutaka Kagawa	Takeshi Shudo	Shizuo Kawai & Takeshi Yamazaki	December 27, 1981
14	"Break the Thousand-Armed Kannon Shot" "Senju Kannon Shūto o Yabure" (Japanese: 千手観音シュートを破れ)	Directed by : Shohei Ishida; Storyboarded by : Aritoki Sugiyama	Akiyoshi Sakai	Shizuo Kawai & Takashi Saijō	January 3, 1982
15	"Super-Secret Technique! Live Nationwide Broadcast" "Chō Higi! Zenkoku Nama Chūkei" (Japanese: 超秘技! 全国ナマ中継)	Directed by : Minoru Akitsu; Storyboarded by : Kenji Terada	Yū Yamamoto	Akio Sakai	January 10, 1982
16	"Chairman Fuman's Magnificent Crime" "Fuman Kaichō no Kareinaru Hanzai" (Japanese: 風満会長の華麗なる犯罪)	Directed by : Yoshizo Tsuda; Storyboarded by : Shinya Sadamitsu	Takao Koyama	Juuji Mizumura	January 17, 1982
17	"The Menacing Amazoness Army" "Kyōi no Amazonesu Gundan" (Japanese: 脅威のアマゾネス軍団)	Directed by : Keiichiro Mochizuki; Storyboarded by : Shinya Sadamitsu	Takao Koyama	Shizuo Kawai & Akio Sakai	January 24, 1982
18	"My First Movie Appearance! I'm a Star" "Eiga Hatsu Shutsuen! Boku wa Sutā Da" (Japanese: 映画初出演! 僕はスターだ)	Directed by : Shohei Ishida; Storyboarded by : Shinya Sadamitsu	Takeshi Shudo	Shizuo Kawai	January 31, 1982
19	"Kappei's Tearful Weight Loss Training" "Kappei Namida no Genryō Tokkun" (Japanese: 勝平涙の減量特訓)	Directed by : Yutaka Kagawa; Storyboarded by : Katsumi Endō	Haruya Yamazaki	Shizuo Kawai	February 7, 1982
20	"A Passionate Teacher Appears!" "Nekketsu Sensei Awawaru!" (Japanese: 熱血先生あらわる!)	Directed by : Keiichiro Mochizuki; Storyboarded by : Kenji Terada	Takao Koyama	Shizuo Kawai & Akio Sakai	February 14, 1982
21	"Birdman Kappei Flying in the Sky" "Tori Ningen・Kappei Sora o Tobu" (Japanese: 鳥人間・勝平空をとぶ)	Directed by : Shohei Ishida; Storyboarded by : Mamoru Oshii	Yū Yamamoto	Shizuo Kawai & Takashi Saijō	February 21, 1982
22	"Intoducing! Kappei's Grandpa" "Tōjō! Kappei no Ojīchan" (Japanese: 登場! 勝平のおじいちゃん)	Yoshizo Tsuda	Takeshi Shudo	Shizuo Kawai	February 28, 1982
23	"Unprecedented! Championship Selection Tournament" "Kūzenzetsudo! Senbatsu Yūshō Taikai" (Japanese: 空前絶後! 選抜優勝大会)	Directed by : Yutaka Kagawa; Storyboarded by : Kenji Terada	Haruya Yamazaki	Akio Sakai	March 7, 1982
24	"Is Kappei a Remote-Controlled Doll?" "Kappei wa Remokon Ningyō?" (Japanese: 勝平はリモコン人形?)	Directed by : Shohei Ishida; Storyboarded by : Shinya Sadamitsu	Takao Koyama	Shizuo Kawai & Takeshi Yamazaki	March 14, 1982
25	"Scary! Kappei's Past" "Osoroshi! Kappei no Kako" (Japanese: 恐ろし! 勝平の過去)	Directed by : Yoshizo Tsuda; Storyboarded by : Aritoki Sugiyama	Akiyoshi Sakai	Shizuo Kawai	March 21, 1982
26	"Mysterious!? Basketball Without Secret Techniques" "Fushigi!? Higi Nashi Basuke" (Japanese: 不思議!? 秘技なしバスケ)	Directed by : Yutaka Kagawa; Storyboarded by : Keiichiro Mochizuki	Akiyoshi Sakai	Akio Sakai	March 28, 1982
27	"The Final Match with Supernatural Powers!" "Chō Nōryoku de Kesshōsen!" (Japanese: 超能力で決勝戦!)	Directed by : Masahisa Ishida; Storyboarded by : Shinya Sadamitsu	Osamu Sekiguchi	Shizuo Kawai & Masami Abe	April 4, 1982
28	"Kappei's Girls Gymnastics Class" "Kappei no Joshi Taisō Kyōshitsu" (Japanese: 勝平の女子体操教室)	Directed by : Yoshizo Tsuda; Storyboarded by : Shinya Sadamitsu	Haruya Yamazaki	Shizuo Kawai	April 11, 1982
29	"Kappei's Ultra Golf" "Kappei no Urutora・Gorufu" (Japanese: 勝平のウルトラ・ゴルフ)	Yutaka Kagawa	Takao Koyama	Shizuo Kawai	April 18, 1982
30	"First Experience! Ice Hockey" "Shotaiken! Aisuhokkē" (Japanese: 初体験! アイスホッケー)	Directed by : Masahisa Ishida; Storyboarded by : Shinya Sadamitsu	Yū Yamamoto	Shizuo Kawai	April 25, 1982
31	"Coach Natsu's Love Fever" "Natsu Kōchi・Rabufībā" (Japanese: 夏コーチ・ラブフィーバー)	Directed by : Yoshizo Tsuda; Storyboarded by : Katsumi Endō	Takeshi Shudo	Shizuo Kawai	May 2, 1982
32	"Kappei Fairy Tale! The Cinderello Story" "Kappei Dōwa! Shindereo Monogatari" (Japanese: 勝平童話! シンデレオ物語)	Directed by : Yutaka Kagawa; Storyboarded by : Aritoki Sugiyama	Akiyoshi Sakai	Shizuo Kawai & Masami Abe	May 9, 1982
33	"A Genius? Kappei Advances into Table Tennis" "Tensai Ka? Kappei Takkyū ni Shinshutsu" (Japanese: 天才か? 勝平卓球に進出)	Masayuki Hayashi	Akiyoshi Sakai	Juuji Mizumura	May 16, 1982
34	"Muscle Beauty Serika vs Kappei!" "Kinniku Bijin・Serika tai Kappei!" (Japanese: 筋肉美人・瀬里香対勝平!)	Directed by : Masahisa Ishida; Storyboarded by : Shinya Sadamitsu	Haruya Yamazaki	Shizuo Kawai	May 23, 1982
35	"Showdown! Kappei vs Hippo Gorilla" "Taiketsu! Kappei tai Kaba Gorira" (Japanese: 対決! 勝平対カバゴリラ)	Directed by : Yutaka Kagawa; Storyboarded by : Katsumi Endō	Takeshi Shudo	Shizuo Kawai	May 30, 1982
36	"Surprise! Akane Joins the Table Tennis Club" "Odoroki! Akane no Takkyū-bu Nyūbu" (Japanese: 驚き! あかねの卓球部入部)	Hiroko Tokita	Takao Koyama	Shizuo Kawai	June 6, 1982
37	"The New Table Tennis Club Strikes Back!" "Shin Takkyū-bu de Hangekida!" (Japanese: 新卓球部で反撃だ!)	Directed by : Yoshizo Tsuda; Storyboarded by : Aritoki Sugiyama	Akiyoshi Sakai	Juuji Mizumura	June 13, 1982
38	"Hilarious! Kappei's Pro-Wrestling Table Tennis" "Bakushō! Kappei no Puroresu Takkyū" (Japanese: 爆笑! 勝平のプロレス卓球)	Shinya Sadamitsu	Haruya Yamazaki	Masami Abe	June 20, 1982
39	"Secret Technique Throbbing Ball vs the Four Kings" "Higi Jīnbōru tai Shiten'nō" (Japanese: 秘技ジーンボール対四天王)	Directed by : Masahisa Ishida; Storyboarded by : Shinya Sadamitsu	Haruya Yamazaki	Shizuo Kawai	June 27, 1982
40	"Fierce Battle! Kappei vs Akane" "Nessen! Kappei tai Akane" (Japanese: 熱戦! 勝平対あかね)	Directed by : Yutaka Kagawa; Storyboarded by : Shinya Sadamitsu	Takao Koyama	Juuji Mizumura	July 4, 1982
41	"Mysterious? Electric Man Kappei" "Shinpi? Denki Ningen Kappei" (Japanese: 神秘? 電気人間勝平)	Hiroko Tokita	Yuriko Fujii	Shizuo Kawai	July 11, 1982
42	"Final Battle Against Hippo Gorilla!" "Kaba Gorira to no Saishū Kessen!" (Japanese: カバゴリラとの最終決戦!)	Directed by : Yoshizo Tsuda; Storyboarded by : Aritoki Sugiyama	Sukehiro Tomita	Takanori Hasegawa	July 18, 1982
43	"First Appearance! Joe Cocker" "Shin Tōjō! Jō・Kokkā" (Japanese: 新登場! ジョー・コッカー)	Directed by : Yutaka Kagawa; Storyboarded by : Shinya Sadamitsu	Harumi Saito	Shizuo Kawai	July 25, 1982
44	"Cocker's Lost Treasure" "Kokkā no Ushinwareta Hihā" (Japanese: コッカーの失われた秘宝)	Directed by : Hiroyuki Tanaka; Storyboarded by : Katsumi Endō	Takeshi Shudo	Masami Abe	August 1, 1982
45	"Great Terror Big Bear" "Dai Kyofū Biggu・Beā" (Japanese: 大恐怖ビッグ・ベアー)	Directed by : Masahisa Ishida; Storyboarded by : Shinya Sadamitsu	Haruya Yamazaki	Juuji Mizumura	August 8, 1982
46	"West Side Basketball" "Uesto Saido Dai Basuke" (Japanese: ウエストサイド大バスケ)	Directed by : Yoshizo Tsuda; Storyboarded by : Hiroshi Sasagawa	Takeshi Shudo	Shizuo Kawai	August 15, 1982
47	"Kappei's Space Opera!" "Kappei no Supēsu Opera Da!" (Japanese: 勝平のスペースオペラだ!)	Directed by : Yutaka Kagawa; Storyboarded by : Futoshi Takano	Sukehiro Tomita	Takanori Hasegawa	August 22, 1982
48	"Kappei Returns to Aso!" "Kappei Aso ni Kaeru!" (Japanese: 勝平阿蘇に帰る!)	Directed by : Masahisa Ishida; Storyboarded by : Katsumi Endō	Takao Koyama	Shizuo Kawai	August 29, 1982
49	"Kappei Sumo! Put Some Spirit into It" "Kappei Sumou Da! Hakkeyoi" (Japanese: 勝平相撲だ! ハッケヨイ)	Directed by : Yoshizo Tsuda; Storyboarded by : Shinya Sadamitsu	Sukehiro Tomita	Juuji Mizumura & Akinobu Takahashi	September 5, 1982
50	"Unintentional Fencing Club Entry" "Fenshingu Oshikake Nyūbu" (Japanese: フェンシングおしかけ入部)	Hiroko Tokita	Haruya Yamazaki	Masami Abe	September 12, 1982
51	"A New Secret Technique! Clothespins" "Deta Shin Higi! Sentaku Basumi" (Japanese: 出た新秘技! 洗たくバサミ)	Directed by : Yutaka Kagawa; Storyboarded by : Aritoki Sugiyama	Takeshi Shudo	Takashi Saijō & Akinobu Takahashi	September 19, 1982
52	"Grandma Kappei's Intensive Training!" "Kappei Bāchan Dai Tokkun!" (Japanese: 勝平ばあちゃん大特訓!)	Masayuki Hayashi	Takao Koyama	Shizuo Kawai	September 26, 1982
53	"Kappei's Training Facility Revealed!" "Kappei-shiki Tokkun-ba Dai Kōkai!" (Japanese: 勝平式特訓場大公開!)	Directed by : Yoshizo Tsuda; Storyboarded by : Shinya Sadamitsu	Sukehiro Tomita	Juuji Mizumura & Akinobu Takahashi	October 3, 1982
54	"Chess-style Ranking Decider!" "Chesu-shiki Kaikyū Kettei-Sandai!" (Japanese: チェス式階級決定戦だ!)	Katsuhito Akiyama	Harumi Saito	Kenzō Koizumi	October 10, 1982
55	"Invincible! The Jiggly Sword Technique" "Muteki! Kunyakunya Kenpōda" (Japanese: 無敵! クニャクニャ剣法だ)	Hiroko Tokita	Takao Koyama	Takashi Saijō & Akinobu Takahashi	October 17, 1982
56	"The Werewolf's Challenge" "Ōkami Otoko no Chōsen" (Japanese: オオカミ男の挑戦!)	Directed by : Hiroyuki Tanaka; Storyboarded by : Shinya Sadamitsu	Haruya Yamazaki	Masami Abe	October 24, 1982
57	"Great Illusion! Akane's Transformation" "Dai Genjutsu! Akane Henshin" (Japanese: 大幻術! あかね変身)	Directed by : Masahisa Ishida; Storyboarded by : Aritoki Sugiyama	Akiyoshi Sakai	Shizuo Kawai	October 31, 1982
58	"Stupidly Strong! Kappei Defeats Robo" "Baka Tsuyo! Kappei Datō Robo" (Japanese: バカ強! 勝平打倒ロボ)	Directed by : Yoshizo Tsuda; Storyboarded by : Shinya Sadamitsu	Takeshi Shudo	Juuji Mizumura & Akinobu Takahashi	November 7, 1982
59	"Bankruptcy! Seirin High School in a Big Pinch" "Tōsan! Seirin Kōkō Dai Pinchi" (Japanese: 倒産! 青林高校大ピンチ)	Yutaka Kagawa	Akiyoshi Sakai	Fumio Iida	November 14, 1982
60	"It's a Battle of Strength! Superhuman Race" "Tairyoku Shōbuda! Chojin Rēsu" (Japanese: 体力勝負だ! 超人レース)	Directed by : Hiroyuki Tanaka; Storyboarded by : Katsumi Endō	Haruya Yamazaki	Takashi Saijō	November 21, 1982
61	"Desperation! Big Unicycle Jump" "Kesshi! Ichirinsha Dai Janpu" (Japanese: 決死! 一輪車大ジャンプ)	Directed by : Katsuhito Akiyama; Storyboarded by : Shinya Sadamitsu	Takao Koyama	Masami Abe	November 28, 1982
62	"Who is the Winning Runner!" "Yūsho Rannā wa Dare Da!" (Japanese: 優勝ランナーはだれだ!)	Hiroko Tokita	Sukehiro Tomita	Fumio Iida	December 5, 1982
63	"Panic over the Deadly Deathmatch" "Shi no Desumacchi・Panikku" (Japanese: 死のデスマッチ・パニック)	Yutaka Kagawa	Akiyoshi Sakai	Juuji Mizumura	December 12, 1982
64	"Farewell! Fallen Heroes" "Saraba! Chiri Yuku Yūsha-tachi" (Japanese: さらば! 散りゆく勇者たち)	Directed by : Yoshizo Tsuda; Storyboarded by : Katsumi Endō	Haruya Yamazaki	Shizuo Kawai	December 19, 1982
65	"Kappei's Name will Live on Forever" "Kappei no Na wa Eikyū ni Fumetsu desu" (Japanese: 勝平の名は永久に不滅です)	Masayuki Hayashi	Takao Koyama	Takashi Saijō	December 26, 1982
