= Ōjōgiwa no Imi o Shire! =

Japanese manga series

- First tankōbon volume cover

往生際の意味を知れ!
- Genre: Romance
- Manga
- Written by: Kyo Yoneshiro
- Published by: Shogakukan
- Magazine: Weekly Big Comic Spirits
- Original run: February 22, 2020 – July 24, 2023
- Volumes: 8
- Television drama
- Directed by: Hidenobu Abera
- Written by: Takeshi Takemura; Mari Hiraki
- Original network: MBS
- Original run: March 8, 2023 – April 26, 2023
- Episodes: 8
- icon

Ōjōgiwa no Imi o Shire! (Japanese: 往生際の意味を知れ!; lit. 'Know the Meaning of Giving Up!') is a Japanese manga series written and illustrated by Kyo Yoneshiro. It was serialized in Shogakukan's seinen manga magazine Weekly Big Comic Spirits from February 2020 to July 2023, with its chapters collected in eight tankōbon volumes. An eight-episode television drama adaptation was broadcast on MBS from March to April 2023.

== Media ==
=== Manga ===
Written and illustrated by Kyo Yoneshiro, Ōjōgiwa no Imi o Shire! was serialized in Shogakukan's seinen manga magazine Weekly Big Comic Spirits from February 22, 2020, to July 24, 2023. Shogakukan collected its chapters in eight tankōbon volumes from June 30, 2020, to August 30, 2023.

==== Volumes ====
No.	Japanese release date	Japanese ISBN
1	June 30, 2020	978-4-09-860634-4
2	September 30, 2020	978-4-09-860743-3
3	December 25, 2020	978-4-09-860786-0
4	June 30, 2021	978-4-09-861048-8
5	May 30, 2022	978-4-09-861340-3
6	October 28, 2022	978-4-09-861455-4
7	February 28, 2023	978-4-09-861588-9
8	August 30, 2023	978-4-09-861707-4

=== Drama ===
An eight-episode television drama adaptation was broadcast on MBS from March 8 to April 26, 2023. (Note: MBS listed the air dates for the series on Tuesday at 25:04, which is effectively Wednesday at 1:04 a.m. JST.) The opening theme song is "Ōjōgiwa no Imi o Shire!" (往生際の意味を知れ!) by Tooboe and the ending theme song is "Fool" by Hitsujibungaku.

== Reception ==
The manga was nominated for the 2021 Next Manga Awards in the print category.

== See also ==
- Ageku no Hate no Kanon, another manga series by the same author
