= Ageku no Hate no Kanon =

Japanese manga series

- First tankōbon volume cover

あげくの果てのカノン
- Genre: Romance; Science fiction
- Manga
- Written by: Kyo Yoneshiro
- Published by: Shogakukan
- Magazine: Monthly Big Comic Spirits
- Original run: August 27, 2015 – February 27, 2018
- Volumes: 5
- icon

Ageku no Hate no Kanon (あげくの果てのカノン; lit. 'Kanon in the End') is a Japanese manga series written and illustrated by Kyo Yoneshiro. It was serialized in Shogakukan's seinen manga magazine Monthly Big Comic Spirits from August 2015 to February 2018, with its chapters collected in five tankōbon volumes.

== Plot ==
Kanon Takatsuki, a shy young woman, has long been in love with her high school senior, Sousuke Sakai. After being rejected when she confesses to him at graduation, Kanon continues to hold onto her feelings even as Sousuke becomes a combat operative for the Alien Lifeform Countermeasures Committee (SLC), an organization that fights extraterrestrial creatures known as "Jelly". Because Sousuke is frequently injured in battle, he undergoes a medical procedure called "Repair", which restores his body but gradually alters his personality and emotions over time.

Years later, Kanon reunites with Sousuke when he visits the pastry shop where she works. As Sousuke's marriage to his wife Hatsuo, an SLC researcher studying the psychological effects of Repair, begins to deteriorate, he grows closer to Kanon and eventually leaves with her. In response, Hatsuo releases captured Jelly specimens, causing a major disaster in Tokyo and forcing Sousuke to return to battle. Due to his repeated Repairs, Sousuke eventually loses his emotional attachment to Kanon, and she leaves Tokyo to move on with her life.

Ten years later, Kanon is working as a pastry chef when Sousuke, now living a different life and having lost his memories, visits her shop. After hearing music that triggers his memories, Sousuke remembers Kanon and calls out to her, and the story ends as Kanon, still in love with him, begins to fall in love with him once again.

== Publication ==
Written and illustrated by Kyo Yoneshiro, Ageku no Hate no Kanon was serialized in Shogakukan's seinen manga magazine Monthly Big Comic Spirits from August 27, 2015, to February 27, 2018. Shogakukan collected its chapters in five tankōbon volumes, released from June 10, 2016, to June 12, 2018.

=== Volumes ===
No.	Japanese release date	Japanese ISBN
1	June 10, 2016	978-4-09-187590-7
2	October 12, 2016	978-4-09-187773-4
3	April 12, 2017	978-4-09-189429-8
4	November 10, 2017	978-4-09-189684-1
5	June 12, 2018	978-4-09-189886-9

== Reception ==
Ageku no Hate no Kanon ranked 15th on the "Nationwide Bookstore Employees' Recommended Comics" by the Honya Club website in 2018.

== See also ==
- Ōjōgiwa no Imi o Shire!, another manga series by the same author
