= Sins of Kujo =

Japanese manga series

- First tankōbon volume cover, featuring Taiza Kujo (center) and Shinji Karasuma (right)

九条の大罪
- Genre: Legal drama
- Manga
- Written by: Shohei Manabe
- Published by: Shogakukan
- Magazine: Weekly Big Comic Spirits
- Original run: October 12, 2020 – present
- Volumes: 17
- Television drama
- Directed by: Nobuhiro Doi; Takeyoshi Yamamoto; Hiroshi Adachi
- Produced by: Jun Nasuda
- Written by: Nonji Nemoto
- Studio: TBS Sparkle; TBS
- Licensed by: Netflix
- Original run: April 2, 2026
- Episodes: 10
- Live-action film
- Directed by: Nobuhiro Doi
- Written by: Nonji Nemoto
- Studio: TBS Sparkle
- Released: January 27, 2027
- icon

Sins of Kujo (Japanese: 九条の大罪, Hepburn: Kujō no Taizai; lit. 'Kujō's Deadly Sins') is a Japanese manga series written and illustrated by Shohei Manabe. It has been serialized in Shogakukan's seinen manga magazine Weekly Big Comic Spirits since October 2020, with its chapters collected in 17 tankōbon volumes as of August 2026. A ten-episode live-action drama series premiered worldwide on Netflix in April 2026. A live action film adaptation is set to premiere in January 2027.

== Synopsis ==
Set in the modern Japanese legal world, the series follows Taiza Kujo (九条 間人, Kujō Taiza), a lawyer living in a tent on a building rooftop, as he tackles difficult cases involving clients such as members of organized crime groups, semi-yakuza, and ex-convicts. Together with Shinji Karasuma (烏丸 真司, Karasuma Shinji)—a lawyer who graduated at the top of his class from the University of Tokyo's Faculty of Law and is currently staying at his office—he takes on a series of cases involving the darker side of society, including fatal drunk-driving accidents, drug-related crimes, and fraud at nursing homes.

== Media ==
=== Manga ===
Written and illustrated by Shohei Manabe, Sins of Kujo started in Shogakukan's seinen manga magazine Weekly Big Comic Spirits on October 12, 2020. Shogakukan has collected its chapters into individual tankōbon volumes. The first volume was released on February 26, 2021. As of August 3, 2026, 17 volumes have been released.

==== Volumes ====
No.	Japanese release date	Japanese ISBN
1	September 10, 2021	978-4-09-860848-5
2	May 28, 2021	978-4-09-861044-0
3	August 30, 2021	978-4-09-861125-6
4	November 30, 2021	978-4-09-861184-3
5	March 30, 2022	978-4-09-861262-8
6	July 29, 2022	978-4-09-861383-0
7	November 30, 2022	978-4-09-861471-4
8	March 30, 2023	978-4-09-861603-9
9	September 28, 2023	978-4-09-862521-5
10	December 27, 2023	978-4-09-862609-0
11	February 29, 2024	978-4-09-862680-9
12	July 30, 2024	978-4-09-863004-2
13	December 26, 2024	978-4-09-863091-2
14	March 28, 2025	978-4-09-863383-8
15	October 30, 2025	978-4-09-863535-1
16	April 2, 2026	978-4-09-863654-9
17	August 3, 2026	978-4-09-864060-7

=== Live-action series ===
In October 2025, TBS and Netflix announced that the manga would receive a live-action series adaptation set to premiere on Netflix in 2026. The ten-episode series premiered worldwide on April 2, 2026. Hitsujibungaku performed the series's theme song "Dogs".

=== Live-action film ===
A live-action film adaptation directed by Nobuhiro Doi, featuring staff and cast from the television series, is set to premiere on January 8, 2027. The film is being produced by TBS Sparkle and will be distributed by Toho. Hitsujibungaku will perform the film's theme song "Dispel".

== Reception ==
By July 2026, the manga had over 5 million copies in circulation. The series ranked 10th on the Nationwide Bookstore Employees' Recommended Comics of 2022. It was picked as a nominee for "Best Comic" at the 51st Angoulême International Comics Festival, held in 2024. It was nominated for the 70th Shogakukan Manga Award in 2024.
