= Tenohira ni Ai o! =

Japanese manga series

- First tankōbon volume cover

てのひらにアイを!
- Genre: Romantic comedy; Sports
- Manga
- Written by: Kōji Murata
- Published by: Shogakukan
- Magazine: Weekly Big Comic Spirits
- Original run: August 1, 2016 – October 23, 2017
- Volumes: 5

Tenohira ni Ai o! (てのひらにアイを!) is a Japanese manga series written and illustrated by Kōji Murata. It was serialied in Shogakukan's seinen manga magazine Weekly Big Comic Spirits from August 2016 to October 2017, with its chapters collected in five tankōbon volumes.

== Publication ==
Written and illustrated by Kōji Murata, Tenohira ni Ai o! was serialized in Shogakukan's seinen manga magazine Weekly Big Comic Spirits from August 1, 2016, to October 23, 2017. Shogakukan collected its chapters in five tankōbon volumes, released from October 28, 2016, to November 30, 2017.

=== Volumes ===
No.	Japanese release date	Japanese ISBN
1	October 28, 2016	978-4-09-187850-2
2	January 30, 2017	978-4-09-189335-2
3	April 28, 2017	978-4-09-189485-4
4	July 28, 2017	978-4-09-189604-9
5	April 18, 2019	978-4-09-189688-9
