= Ponkotsu Ponko =

Japanese manga series

- First tankōbon volume cover

ぽんこつポン子
- Genre: Slapstick comedy
- Manga
- Written by: Keita Yatera
- Published by: Shogakukan
- Magazine: Weekly Big Comic Spirits
- Original run: March 25, 2019 – May 24, 2021
- Volumes: 10
- icon

Ponkotsu Ponko (ぽんこつポン子; "Useless Ponko") is a Japanese manga series written and illustrated by Keita Yatera. It was serialized in Shogakukan's seinen manga magazine Weekly Big Comic Spirits from March 2019 to May 2021, with its chapters collected in ten tankōbon volumes.

== Plot ==
Recently widowed, Yoshioka reluctantly accepts a hand-me-down housekeeping robot named Ponko from his adult children, leading to hilarious consequences.

== Publication ==
Written and illustrated by Keita Yatera, Ponkotsu Ponko was serialized in Shogakukan's seinen manga magazine Weekly Big Comic Spirits from March 25, 2019, to May 24, 2021. Shogakukan collected its chapters in ten tankōbon volumes, released from July 30, 2019, to May 28, 2021.

=== Volumes ===
No.	Japanese release date	Japanese ISBN
1	July 30, 2019	978-4-09-860356-5
2	September 30, 2019	978-4-09-860403-6
3	November 29, 2019	978-4-09-860485-2
4	March 12, 2020	978-4-09-860546-0
5	May 29, 2020	978-4-09-860615-3
6	July 30, 2020	978-4-09-860677-1
7	October 30, 2020	978-4-09-860709-9
8	December 25, 2020	978-4-09-860784-6
9	March 30, 2021	978-4-09-860868-3
10	May 28, 2021	978-4-09-861043-3

== Reception ==
In 2020, the manga was one of the 50 nominees for the sixth Next Manga Awards.
