= Hengoku no Schwester =

Japanese manga series

- First volume cover

辺獄のシュヴェスタ (Hengoku no Shuvesuta)
- Genre: Historical
- Manga
- Written by: Minoru Takeyoshi
- Published by: Shogakukan
- Magazine: Monthly Big Comic Spirits
- Original run: December 27, 2014 – October 27, 2017
- Volumes: 6

Hengoku no Schwester (Note: Japanese: 辺獄のシュヴェスタ, Hepburn: Hengoku no Shuvesuta; "The Convent of the Damned") is a Japanese manga series written and illustrated by Minoru Takeyoshi. It was serialized in Shogakukan's seinen manga magazine Monthly Big Comic Spirits from December 2014 to October 2017, with its chapters collected in six tankōbon volumes.

== Publication ==
Hengoku no Schwester, written and illustrated by Minoru Takeyoshi, was serialized in Shogakukan's seinen manga magazine Monthly Big Comic Spirits from December 27, 2014, to October 27, 2017. Shogakukan collected its chapters in six tankōbon volumes, released from June 12, 2015, to December 12, 2017.

The manga is licensed in France by Glénat.

=== Volumes ===
No.	Japanese release date	Japanese ISBN
1	June 12, 2015	978-4-09-187059-9
2	November 12, 2015	978-4-09-187325-5
3	April 12, 2016	978-4-09-187529-7
4	September 12, 2016	978-4-09-187776-5
5	February 10, 2017	978-4-09-189350-5
6	December 12, 2017	978-4-09-189699-5

== See also ==
- Battleground Workers, another manga series by the same author
