= Slow Motion o Mōichido =

Japanese manga series

- First tankōbon volume cover, featuring Tomoyo Yakushimaru

スローモーションをもう一度 (Surō Mōshon o Mōichido)
- Genre: Romantic comedy
- Manga
- Written by: Rie Kano
- Published by: Shogakukan
- Magazine: Weekly Big Comic Spirits
- Original run: August 8, 2016 – May 21, 2018
- Volumes: 7
- icon

Slow Motion o Mōichido (Japanese: スローモーションをもう一度, Hepburn: Surō Mōshon o Mōichido; "Slow Motion Once More") is a Japanese manga series written and illustrated by Rie Kano. It was serialized in Shogakukan's seinen manga magazine Weekly Big Comic Spirits from August 2016 to May 2018.

== Plot ==
High school first-year Hiro Ōtaki leads a steady, outgoing social life, but secretly maintains a deep enthusiasm for 1980s pop culture, especially music and idols such as Akina Nakamori. One day, he discovers that his secret interest is shared by Tomoyo Yakushimaru, a homely, unpopular girl in his class. Intrigued, Hiro pursues a friendship and eventual romance with her, meeting typical obstacles—misunderstandings, disapproving peers, jealous rivals etc.—along the way.

Each chapter is named after a specific piece of 1980s pop culture (which may or may not be its in-story focus), mainly iconic pop songs and films.

== Publication ==
Written and illustrated by Rie Kano, Slow Motion o Mōichido was serialized in Shogakukan's seinen manga magazine Weekly Big Comic Spirits from August 8, 2016, to May 21, 2018. Shogakukan collected its chapters in seven tankōbon volumes, released from October 28, 2016, to October 30, 2018.

=== Volumes ===
No.	Japanese release date	Japanese ISBN
1	October 28, 2016	978-4-09-187849-6
2	January 30, 2017	978-4-09-189334-5
3	April 28, 2017	978-4-09-189484-7
4	July 28, 2017	978-4-09-189603-2
5	October 30, 2017	978-4-09-189720-6
6	January 30, 2018	978-4-09-189780-0
7	May 30, 2018	978-4-09-189879-1
