= Dead End (manga) =

Japanese manga series

- First tankōbon volume cover, featuring Shirou Shiba
- Genre: Action; Science fiction; Suspense
- Manga
- Written by: Shohei Manabe
- Published by: Kodansha
- English publisher: NA: Tokyopop
- Imprint: Afternoon KC
- Magazine: Monthly Afternoon
- Original run: February 23, 2001 – September 25, 2002
- Volumes: 4
- icon

Dead End, known in Japan as The End (stylized in all caps), is a Japanese manga series written and illustrated by Shohei Manabe. It was serialized in Kodansha's seinen manga magazine Monthly Afternoon from February 2001 to September 2002, and published in four tankōbon volumes. The manga was licensed in North America by Tokyopop.

== Plot ==
Shirou Shiba is a construction worker, tired of the usual daily routine of his job; he hopes that something will come to awake him from the monotony of his life. His wish is seemingly answered when a young girl named Lucy, falling naked from the sky, enters his life. They spend two days together, enough for Shirou to fall in love with her. On the third day however, when Shirou comes back home, he cannot find her anymore, and instead he finds his friends murdered.

After that, he meets a stranger who claims to be his friend, and learns that he had his memory voluntarily erased: he knew Lucy from before, and to find a way to solve this puzzle, he has to find five old friends who had their memory erased just like him. Along with these five friends he must uncover, there are many others who seek his death and one particular monster who kills in a brutal fashion.

== Publication ==
Written and illustrated by Shohei Manabe, the series was serialized in Kodansha's seinen manga magazine Monthly Afternoon from February 23, 2001, (Note: Debuted in the magazine's April 2001 issue, released on February 23, 2001.) to September 25, 2002. (Note: Finished in the magazine's November 2002 issue, released on September 25, 2002.) Its chapters were collected into four individual tankōbon volumes, released between August 23, 2001, and November 22, 2002.

Tokyopop had licensed the manga for English publication, releasing four volumes between March 8, 2005, and May 9, 2006.

=== Volumes ===
| No. | Original release date | Original ISBN | English release date | English ISBN |
|---|---|---|---|---|
| 1 | August 23, 2001 | 978-4-06-321126-9 | March 8, 2005 | 978-1-59-532161-9 |
1. "Lucy" (ルーシー, Rūshī); 2. "The Beginning Man" (最初の男, Saisho no Otoko); 3. "The First Man" (第一の男, Dai Ichi no Otoko); 4. "The Second Man" (第二の男, Dai Ni no Otoko)
| 2 | February 22, 2002 | 978-4-06-321133-7 | June 7, 2005 | 978-1-59-532162-6 |
5. "The Third Man" (第三の男, Dai San no Otoko); 6. "The Third Man: Episode II" (第三の男 二, Dai San no Otoko: Ni); 7. "The Third Man: Episode III" (第三の男 三, Dai San no Otoko: San); 8. "The First Enemy" (第一の敵, Dai Ichi no Teki); 9. "The Boss" (親父, Oyaji); 10. "Chappa" (チャバ, Chaba)
| 3 | July 23, 2002 | 978-4-06-321139-9 | September 6, 2005 | 978-1-59-532163-3 |
11. "Shirou" (シロウ, Shirō); 12. "Shirou: Episode 2" (シロウ (2), Shirō (2)); 13. "The Fourth Man (?)" (第四の男 (?), Dai Yon no Otoko (?)); 14. "The Second Enemy" (第二の敵, Dai Ni no Teki); 15. "The Last Man" (最後の男, Saigo no Otoko)
| 4 | November 22, 2002 | 978-4-06-321141-2 | May 9, 2006 | 978-1-59-532164-0 |
16. "Attack" (攻撃, Kōgeki); 17. "Surprise Attack" (奇襲, Kishū); 18. "Reminiscence" (追憶, Tsuioku); 19. "Lucy 2" (ルーシー 2, Rūshī 2); 20. "In The End"

== Reception ==
Jarred Pine of Mania liked the story and felt the artwork complemented the story well. Hilary Goldstein of IGN praised the story, which she described as a "slow burn". She also felt that the artwork was realistic. In Manga: The Complete Guide, Jason Thompson wrote the story "has the feel of a dream" and praised the artwork for matching the setting.
