= Ship of Theseus (manga) =

Japanese manga series

- First tankōbon volume cover

テセウスの船 (Teseusu no Fune)
- Genre: Crime, thriller
- Manga
- Written by: Toshiya Higashimoto
- Published by: Kodansha
- English publisher: US: Kodansha
- Imprint: Morning KC
- Magazine: Morning
- Original run: June 22, 2017 – June 27, 2019
- Volumes: 10
- Television drama
- Directed by: Yasuharu Ishii; Aya Matsuki; Daisuke Yamamuro
- Written by: Maki Takahashi
- Music by: Yugo Kanno
- Studio: Daiei TV-Film; TBS
- Original network: JNN (TBS)
- Original run: January 19, 2020 – March 22, 2020
- Episodes: 10
- icon

Ship of Theseus (Japanese: テセウスの船, Hepburn: Teseusu no Fune) is a Japanese manga series written and illustrated by Toshiya Higashimoto. It was serialized in Kodansha's seinen manga magazine Morning from June 2017 to June 2019, with its chapters collected in ten tankōbon volumes. A ten-episode television drama adaptation was broadcast on TBS from January to March 2020.

== Media ==
=== Manga ===
Written and illustrated by Toshiya Higashimoto, Ship of Theseus was serialized in Kodansha's seinen manga magazine Morning from June 22, 2017, to June 27, 2019. Kodansha collected its chapters in ten tankōbon volumes, released from September 22, 2017, to December 23, 2019.

In August 2024, Kodansha began publishing the series in English on its K Manga digital service.

==== Volumes ====
No.	Japanese release date	Japanese ISBN
1	September 22, 2017	978-4-06-510310-4
2	December 20, 2017	978-4-06-510677-8
3	March 23, 2018	978-4-06-511105-5
4	June 22, 2018	978-4-06-511691-3
5	September 21, 2018	978-4-06-512881-7
6	December 21, 2018	978-4-06-513974-5
7	March 22, 2019	978-4-06-514962-1
8	June 21, 2019	978-4-06-516292-7
9	November 22, 2019	978-4-06-517756-3
10	December 23, 2019	978-4-06-517758-7

=== Drama ===
A ten-episode television drama adaptation was broadcast on TBS from January 19 to March 22, 2020. Uru performed the series' theme song "Anataga Iru Kotode" (あなたがいることで).

== Reception ==
The series' fourth volume was nominated for the 47th Angoulême International Comics Festival in the Best Comic category in 2019, and the tenth volume was nominated for the 49th edition in 2021.

== See also ==
- Platanus no Mi, another manga series by the same author
