= Mizu Polo =

Japanese manga series

- First tankōbon volume cover

みずぽろ (Mizu Poro)
- Genre: Comedy; Sports
- Manga
- Written by: Miho Isshiki
- Illustrated by: Naoki Mizuguchi
- Published by: Shogakukan
- Imprint: Shōnen Sunday Comics Special
- Magazine: Weekly Shōnen Sunday
- Original run: November 8, 2023 – present
- Volumes: 8
- icon

Mizu Polo (Japanese: みずぽろ, Hepburn: Mizu Poro; lit. 'Water Polo') is a Japanese manga series written by Miho Isshiki and illustrated by Naoki Mizuguchi. It has been serialized in Shogakukan's shōnen manga magazine Weekly Shōnen Sunday since November 2023.

== Synopsis ==
Chikuma Shinano and Kei Yamashiro are transfer students from different prefectures who ended up at the same school in Tokyo. Yamashiro is 191 cm tall and has a natural talent for water polo, whereas Shinano is 185 cm tall and does not, but reluctantly accepts Yamashiro's invitation to join the club.

== Publication ==
Written by Miho Isshiki and illustrated by Naoki Mizuguchi, Mizu Polo started in Shogakukan's shōnen manga magazine Weekly Shōnen Sunday on November 8, 2023. Shogakukan released the first tankōbon volume on May 17, 2024. As of August 18, 2026, eight volumes have been released.

=== Volumes ===
No.	Release date	ISBN
1	May 17, 2024	978-4-09-853317-6
2	July 18, 2024	978-4-09-853454-8
3	November 18, 2024	978-4-09-853715-0
4	March 18, 2025	978-4-09-854030-3
5	August 18, 2025	978-4-09-854222-2
6	December 18, 2025	978-4-09-854387-8
7	March 18, 2026	978-4-09-854543-8
8	August 18, 2026	978-4-09-854766-1

== Reception ==
The manga was nominated for the 2024 Next Manga Award in the print category. It was nominated for the 2025 edition in the same category.

== See also ==
- Saotome Senshu, Hitakakusu, another manga series by Naoki Mizuguchi
