= Platanus no Mi =

Japanese manga series

- First tankōbon volume cover

プラタナスの実 (Puratanasu no Mi)
- Genre: Medical; Slice of life
- Manga
- Written by: Toshiya Higashimoto
- Published by: Shogakukan
- Magazine: Weekly Big Comic Spirits
- Original run: October 5, 2020 – May 15, 2023
- Volumes: 10
- icon

Platanus no Mi (Japanese: プラタナスの実, Hepburn: Puratanasu no Mi; "Seed of the Platanus") is a Japanese manga series written and illustrated by Toshiya Higashimoto. It was serialized in Shogakukan's seinen manga magazine Weekly Big Comic Spirits from October 2020 to May 2023, with its chapters collected in ten tankōbon volumes.

== Publication ==
Written and illustrated by Toshiya Higashimoto, Platanus no Mi was serialized in Shogakukan's seinen manga magazine Weekly Big Comic Spirits from October 5, 2020, to May 15, 2023. Shogakukan collected its chapters in ten tankōbon volumes, released from January 29, 2021, to September 28, 2023.

=== Volumes ===
No.	Japanese release date	Japanese ISBN
1	January 29, 2021	978-4-09-860782-2
2	March 30, 2021	978-4-09-860867-6
3	July 30, 2021	978-4-09-861105-8
4	October 30, 2021	978-4-09-861185-0
5	March 30, 2022	978-4-09-861271-0
6	July 29, 2022	978-4-09-861382-3
7	November 30, 2022	978-4-09-861470-7
8	March 30, 2023	978-4-09-861602-2
9	July 28, 2023	978-4-09-862487-4
10	September 28, 2023	978-4-09-862515-4

== See also ==
- Ship of Theseus, another manga series by the same author
