= Re Cervin =

Japanese manga series

- First tankōbon volume cover

レ・セルバン (Re Seruban)
- Genre: Dark fantasy
- Manga
- Written by: Kōsuke Hamada
- Published by: Shogakukan
- Magazine: Weekly Big Comic Spirits
- Original run: January 8, 2022 – November 9, 2026
- Volumes: 10
- icon

Re Cervin (Japanese: レ・セルバン, Hepburn: Re Seruban; French for "Matterhorn") is a Japanese manga series written and illustrated by Kōsuke Hamada. It was serialized in Shogakukan's seinen manga magazine Weekly Big Comic Spirits from January 2022 to November 2026.

== Publication ==
Written and illustrated by Kōsuke Hamada, Re Cervin was serialized in Shogakukan's seinen manga magazine Weekly Big Comic Spirits from January 8, 2022, to November 9, 2026. Shogakukan has collected its chapters into individual tankōbon volumes. The first two volumes were released on April 28, 2023. As of August 28, 2026, ten volumes have been released.

=== Volumes ===
No.	Japanese release date	Japanese ISBN
1	April 28, 2023	978-4-09-861357-1
001. "The Fateful Day" (運命の日, Unmei no Hi); 002. "Oath" (誓い, Chikai); 003. "Confession in the Cave" (洞窟の告白, Dōkutsu no Kokuhaku); 004. "A World in Motion" (動きはじめた世界, Ugoki Hajimeta Sekai); 005. "As a Travel Companion..." (旅の仲間として……, Tabi no Nakama to Shite……)
2	April 28, 2023	978-4-09-861393-9
006. "The City of Desire" (欲望の町, Yokubō no Machi); 007. "The Altar of Truth" (真実の祭壇, Shinjitsu no Saidan); 008. "A Family's Descendants" (一族の末裔, Ichizoku no Matsuei); 009. "Gawfell" (ゴーフェル, Gōferu)
3	December 27, 2023	978-4-09-862593-2
010. "Darkness Enshrouds the World" (世界を覆う闇, Sekai o Ō Yami); 011. "Daemon" (魔神, Majin); 012. "Compensation" (代償, Daishō); 013. "The Madwoman's Memories" (狂女の記憶, Kyōjo no Kioku); 014. "Invaders" (侵略者, Shinryaku-sha); 015. "The Daemon Wielder" (魔神を使う者, Majin o Tsukau-sha); 016. "Night Turns to Day..." (一夜明けて…, Ichi Yoakete…); 017. "Departure" (出発, Shuppatsu); 018. "The King's Fist" (王の拳, Ō no Ken); 019. "Sufrandel" (スフランデル, Sufuranderu)
4	May 30, 2024	978-4-09-862791-2
020. "Each New Moon" (それぞれの新月, Sorezore no Shingetsu); 021. "Paradis, Prince of Sufrandel" (スフランデル王子・パラディス, Sufuranderu Ōji Paradisu); 022. "Those Who Have Lost Everything" (喪ったもの達, Ushinatta Mono-tachi); 023. "Both…" (共に…, Tomoni…); 024. "Forest of Calamity" (災厄の森, Saiyaku no Mori); 025. "Lützel the Giant Spider" (大蜘蛛 ルツェル, Ōkumo Rutseru); 026. "Meeting the Princess" (王女との出会い, Ōjo to no Deai); 027. "Mistake" (過ち, Ayamachi); 028. "Supreme God" (最高神, Saikō-shin); 029. "Secret Affair" (密事, Mitsuji)
5	September 30, 2024	978-4-09-863059-2
030. "The Princess's Conflict" (姫君の葛藤, Himegimi no Kattō); 031. "Clash" (激突, Gekitotsu); 032. "Rose's Resolve" (ロゼの決意, Roze no Ketsui); 033. "Reunion" (再会, Saikai); 034. "A King's Vessel" (王の器, Ō no Utsuwa); 035. "Dark Night" (闇夜, Yamiyo); 036. "Raid" (襲撃, Shūgeki); 037. "An Absolute Being, Inhuman Power" (絶大なる者、人外の力, Zetsudainaru Mono, Jingai no Chikara)
6	February 28, 2025	978-4-09-863195-7
038. "Trampling" (蹂躙, Jūrin); 039. "Bringer of Death" (死を背負う者, Shi o Seō mono); 040. "Vestiges of the Mad King" (狂王の残滓, Kyō-ō no Zanshi); 041. "Blade of Fate" (因縁の刃, In'nen no ha); 042. "Gorgorios" (ゴルゴリオス, Gorugoriosu); 043. "Manifestation of a Nightmare" (悪夢の具現, Akumu no Gugen); 044. "Entrusted Wishes" (託された願い, Takusa Reta Negai); 045. "The Boundary of Light and Shadow" (光と影の境界, Hikatokage no Kyōkai)
7	July 30, 2025	978-4-09-863516-0
046. "Rout" (敗走, Haisō); 047. "Breaking Through Enemy Lines" (敵中突破, Tekichūtoppa); 048. "Battle of the Ramparts" (城壁の戦い, Jōheki no Tatakai); 049. "A Defiant Stand" (覚悟の防衛戦, Kakugo no Bōei-sen); 050. "The Time Left" (残された時間, Nokosa Reta Jikan); 051. "Before Dawn" (夜明け前, Yoake Mae)
8	December 26, 2025	978-4-09-863658-7
052. "The Plains of Battle" (激戦の平原, Gekisen no Heigen); 053. "Intrigue in the Palace" (陰謀の城内, Inbō no Kiuchi); 054. "The Roots of Calamity" (過去の禍根, Kako no Kakon); 055. "Fabrice's Tenacity" (ファブリスの執念, Faburisu no Shūnen); 056. "The Battle of Fate" (命運を賭けた戦い, Meiun o Kaketa Tatakai); 057. "The Moment of Reckoning" (決着の時, Ketchaku no Toki)
9	April 30, 2026	978-4-09-863884-0
058. "A New Journey" (新たな旅路, Aratana Tabiji); 059. "The Land of Magic" (魔法の地帯, Mahō no Chitai); 060. "Archmage Luki" (大魔道師・ルキ, Dai Madō-shi Ruki); 061. "Trap of Illusions" (幻影の罠, Gen'ei no Wana); 062. "A Quiet Village" (静かなる村, Shizukanaru Mura); 063. "The White Dragon's Lair" (白龍の棲処, Haku Ryū no Sumika); 064. "The Shiso Prophecy" (シソの予言, Shiso no Yogen)
10	August 28, 2026	978-4-09-864082-9
065. "The Shadow of a Mortal Enemy" (仇敵の影, Kyūteki no Kage); 066. "Contrano" (コントラーノ, Kontorāno); 067. "Outburst of Wrath" (爆発する怒り, Bakuhatsu Suru Ikari); 068. "Vortex of Miasma" (瘴気の渦, Shōki no Uzu); 069. "A Life-or-Death Defense" (命を賭けた防衛, Inochi o Kaketa Bōei); 070. "Father and Daughter's Joint Struggle" (父と娘の共闘, Chichitoko no Kyōtō); 071. "Distorted Power" (歪んだ力, Yuganda Chikara); 072. "Desperate Resolve" (決死の覚悟, Kesshi no Kakugo)

=== Chapters not yet released in tankōbon format ===
73. "A Step Toward Being Together" (共にあるために一歩を, Tomoni Aru Tame ni Ippo o)
74. "Gathering" (集結, Shūketsu)
75. "Omens" (兆し, Kizashi)
76. "The Man in the Depths of My Memory" (記憶の底の男, Kioku no Soko no Otoko)
77. "The Price of Oblivion" (忘却の代償, Bōkyaku no Daishō)
78. "The Final Truth" (最後の真実, Saigo no Shinjitsu)
79. "What Matters Most" (大事なこと, Daijina Koto)
80. "White Dragon Shiso" (白龍シソ, Haku Ryū Shiso)
81. "Oracle" (神託, Shintaku)
82. "Encounter" (邂逅, Kaigō)
83. "Miasma" (瘴気, Shōki)
84. "Clash" (激突, Gekitotsu)
85. "Heaven's Will" (天の意志, Ten no Ishi)
86. "Lapsi's Lightning" (ラプシの雷, Rapushi no Kaminari)
87. "Hope" (望み, Nozomi)
88. "Bad Timing" (おとりこみ中, O torikomi-chū)
89. "True Feelings" (本音, Hon'ne)
90. "To the Castle" (城へ, Shiro e)
91. "Never Alone Again..." (もう、一人には…, Mō, Hitori ni wa…)
92. "Turning a Blind Eye" (見ないようにしてきた, Minai yō ni Shite kita)
93. "Ten Years I've Waited" (10年待ったの, 10-Nen Matta no)
94. "Let's get Married." (結婚しよう。, Kekkon Shiyou)
95. "The Name's Luki." (おれ、ルキ。, Ore, Ruki)

== See also ==
- Hanebado!, another manga series by the same author
