= Battleground Workers =

Japanese manga series

- First tankōbon volume cover

バトルグラウンドワーカーズ (Batoruguraundo Wākāzu)
- Genre: Action, mecha
- Manga
- Written by: Minoru Takeyoshi
- Published by: Shogakukan
- Magazine: Weekly Big Comic Spirits
- Original run: April 22, 2019 – September 27, 2021
- Volumes: 8

Battleground Workers (Japanese: バトルグラウンドワーカーズ, Hepburn: Batoruguraundo Wākāzu) is a Japanese manga series written and illustrated by Minoru Takeyoshi. It was serialized in Shogakukan's seinen manga magazine Weekly Big Comic Spirits from April 2019 to September 2021, with its chapters collected in eight tankōbon volumes.

== Publication ==
Written and illustrated by Minoru Takeyoshi, Battleground Workers was serialized in Shogakukan's seinen manga magazine Weekly Big Comic Spirits from April 22, 2019, to September 27, 2021. Shogakukan collected its chapters in eight tankōbon volumes, released from August 30, 2019, to November 30, 2021.

=== Volumes ===
No.	Japanese release date	Japanese ISBN
1	August 30, 2019	978-4-09-860381-7
2	November 29, 2019	978-4-09-860486-9
3	March 30, 2020	978-4-09-860566-8
4	July 30, 2020	978-4-09-860640-5
5	November 30, 2020	978-4-09-860765-5
6	February 26, 2021	978-4-09-860853-9
7	June 30, 2021	978-4-09-861063-1
8	November 30, 2021	978-4-09-861188-1

== See also ==
- Hengoku no Schwester, another manga series by the same author
