= Run on Your New Legs =

Japanese manga series

- First tankōbon volume cover

新しい足で駆け抜けろ。 (Atarashii Ashi de Kakenukero)
- Genre: Sports
- Manga
- Written by: Wataru Midori
- Published by: Shogakukan
- English publisher: NA: Yen Press
- Magazine: Weekly Big Comic Spirits
- Original run: October 28, 2019 – November 16, 2020
- Volumes: 5
- icon

Run on Your New Legs (Japanese: 新しい足で駆け抜けろ。, Hepburn: Atarashii Ashi de Kakenukero) is a Japanese manga series written and illustrated by Wataru Midori. It was serialized in Shogakukan's seinen manga magazine Weekly Big Comic Spirits from October 2019 to November 2020, with its chapters collected in five tankōbon volumes.

== Publication ==
Written and illustrated by Wataru Midori, Run on Your New Legs was serialized in Shogakukan's seinen manga magazine Weekly Big Comic Spirits from October 28, 2019, to November 16, 2020. Shogakukan collected its chapters in five tankōbon volumes, released from February 28, 2020, to December 25, 2020.

In North America, the manga was licensed for English release by Yen Press. The first volume was released on March 22, 2022.

=== Volumes ===
No.	Original release date	Original ISBN	English release date	English ISBN
1	February 28, 2020	978-4-09-860544-6	March 22, 2022	978-1-9753-3900-5
1. "What Can I Even Do?" (これで何ができんの?, Kore de nan ga dekin no?); 2. "Because It's Cool" (かっこいいからです, Kakkoī kara desu); 3. "Pick Me!!" (俺を選べ!!, Ore o erabe!!); 4. "Early Bird" (早い者勝ちじゃない?, Hayai mono kachi ja nai?); 5. "Competing for Victory...!!" (競って勝つ・・・!!, Kisotte katsu...!!); 6. "A Leg of My Own" (自分の脚, Jibun no ashi)
2	April 27, 2020	978-4-09-860595-8	July 26, 2022	978-1-9753-3901-2
7. "More Like Running Away ("逃げなんじゃねーの, Nige nanja nei no); 8. "No Way in Heck!!" (無理無理!!, Muri muri!!); 9. "Was 100m Always That Far?" (100mってあんな遠かったっけ?, 100m tte anna tōkattakke?); 10. "It's Okay to Fall" (転んでいいんです。, Koronde ī n desu.); 11. "A Child's Job..." (子供というものは･･･, Kodomo to yū mono wa...); 12. "I'm Down" (ウケる!, Ukeru!); 13. "It's All About Play!" (まずは遊ばなきゃね!, Mazu wa asobanakya ne!); 14. "Wanna Be Part of That World" (その世界に行ってみたい, Sono sekai ni itte mitai)
3	June 30, 2020	978-4-09-860639-9	December 13, 2022	978-1-9753-3902-9
15. "Don't Let It Show on Your Face" (顔に出すのやめなよ, Kao ni dasu no yame na yo); 16. "The Last Pass" (最後のパス, Saigo no pasu); 17. "On My Own" (俺は俺で, Ore wa ore de); 18. "Phantom Pain" (幻肢痛, Genshi-tsū); 19. "To Cheer Him Up" (元気のため, Genki no tame); 20. "Putting My Mind to It" (自分でもっと考えよう, Jibun de motto kangaeyō); 21. "Young and Exciting High School Lives" (高校青春ライフ, Kōkō seishun raifu); 22. "Check Socket" (チェックソケット, Chekku soketto)
4	September 30, 2020	978-4-09-860708-2	April 18, 2023	978-1-9753-3903-6
23. "Inter-High Canceled" (インハイなくなった, Inhai nakunatta); 24. "If It Were Me" (俺だったら, Ore dattara); 25. "This Feeling" (こんな気持ち, Konna kimochi); 26. "I'll Be Cheering for You" (応援してあげるよ, Ōen shite ageru yo); 27. "I Ain't Giving Up" (諦めねーからな, Akiramenei kara na); 28. "Back Then" (あの時, Ano ji); 29. "That Same Sky" (同じ空, Onaji sora); 30. "Check Me Out Then" (そん時見ててよ, Son toki mitete yo)
5	December 25, 2020	978-4-09-860785-3	July 18, 2023	978-1-9753-3904-3
31. "The Theme of My Summer" (夏の全部, Natsu no zenbu); 32. "The Same Path" (同じ道, Onaji dō); 33. "Those I'm bringing" (一緒に行けるのは, Issho ni ikeru no wa); 34. "This Is Me Now" (これが今の俺, Kore ga ima no ore); 35. "I'm Back" (戻ってきたんだ, Modotte kita n da); 36. "My Passes" (俺のパス, Ore no pasu); 37. "What I've Gained" (新しく手に入れたもの, Atarashiku te ni ireta mono); Last chapter: "The Reason I Run" (俺が走る理由, Ore ga hashiru riyū)
