= Saturn Return (manga) =

Japanese manga series

- First tankōbon volume cover

サターンリターン (Satān Ritān)
- Manga
- Written by: Akane Torikai
- Published by: Shogakukan
- Magazine: Weekly Big Comic Spirits
- Original run: January 21, 2019 – October 31, 2022
- Volumes: 10
- icon

Saturn Return (Japanese: サターンリターン, Hepburn: Satān Ritān) is a Japanese manga series written and illustrated by Akane Torikai. It was serialized in Shogakukan's seinen manga magazine Weekly Big Comic Spirits from January 2019 to October 2022, with its chapters collected in ten tankōbon volumes.

== Publication ==
Written and illustrated by Akane Torikai, Saturn Return was serialized in Shogakukan's seinen manga magazine Weekly Big Comic Spirits from January 21, 2019, to October 31, 2022. Shogakukan collected its chapters in ten tankōbon volumes, released from June 28, 2019, to February 28, 2023.

=== Volumes ===
No.	Japanese release date	Japanese ISBN
1	June 28, 2019	978-4-09-860314-5
2	November 29, 2019	978-4-09-860487-6
3	April 27, 2019	978-4-09-860598-9
4	September 30, 2019	978-4-09-860742-6
5	March 30, 2021	978-4-09-861008-2
6	November 30, 2021	978-4-09-861147-8
7	July 29, 2022	978-4-09-861384-7
8	October 28, 2022	978-4-09-861454-7
9	February 28, 2023	978-4-09-861587-2
10	February 28, 2023	978-4-09-861590-2

== Reception ==
Saturn Return was one of the Jury Recommended Works at the 23rd Japan Media Arts Festival in 2020. The series has been nominated for the 28th Tezuka Osamu Cultural Prize in 2024.

== See also ==
- Sensei's Pious Lie, another manga series by the same author
