= Watashi no Musuko ga Isekai Tensei Shitappoi Full Ver. =

Japanese manga series

- First tankōbon volume cover

私の息子が異世界転生したっぽい フルver.
- Manga
- Written by: Kanemoto
- Illustrated by: Hikari Shibata
- Published by: Shogakukan
- Magazine: Weekly Big Comic Spirits
- Original run: August 30, 2021 – November 14, 2022
- Volumes: 5

Watashi no Musuko ga Isekai Tensei Shitappoi Full Ver. (私の息子が異世界転生したっぽい フルver.; "My Son Seems to Have Gone Reincarnated to Another World. Full Version") is a Japanese manga series written by Kanemoto and illustrated by Hikari Shibata. It was serialized in Shogakukan's seinen manga magazine Weekly Big Comic Spirits from August 2021 to November 2022, with its chapters collected in five tankōbon volumes.

== Plot ==
Tomota Dobara is a nerdy office worker who meets his high school classmate Mio Hayama for the first time in 17 years. Mio has recently lost her son in a car accident. She is convinced that her son has reincarnated in another world and asks Tomota to help her meet him again.

== Publication ==
Written by Kanemoto and illustrated by Hikari Shibata, Watashi no Musuko ga Isekai Tensei Shitappoi Full Ver. was serialized for 40 chapters in Shogakukan's seinen manga magazine Weekly Big Comic Spirits from August 30, 2021, to November 14, 2022. Shogakukan collected its chapters in five tankōbon volumes, released from December 10, 2021, to January 12, 2023.

The manga has been licensed in France by Mana Books.

=== Volumes ===
No.	Japanese release date	Japanese ISBN
1	December 10, 2021	978-4-09-861202-4
2	April 12, 2022	978-4-09-861269-7
3	July 12, 2022	978-4-09-861327-4
4	October 12, 2022	978-4-09-861441-7
5	January 12, 2023	978-4-09-861498-1

== Reception ==
The manga was nominated for the sixth Takao Saito Award in 2022.
