= Hanebado! =

Japanese manga series

- First tankōbon volume cover, featuring Ayano Hanesaki

はねバド!
- Genre: Sports
- Manga
- Written by: Kōsuke Hamada
- Published by: Kodansha
- Magazine: Good! Afternoon
- Original run: June 7, 2013 – October 7, 2019
- Volumes: 16
- Novel
- Written by: Yūichi Mochizuki
- Illustrated by: Kōsuke Hamada
- Published by: Kodansha
- Imprint: Kodansha Ranobe Bunko
- Published: June 29, 2018
- Anime television series
- Directed by: Shinpei Ezaki
- Produced by: Tetsurō Satomi; Makoto Furukawa; Nobutaka Sakurai; Shunsuke Hosoi; Yōko Baba; Yūichi Tada; Shōta Watase; Bruce Chiou; Naoto Kase
- Written by: Taku Kishimoto
- Music by: Tatsuya Kato
- Studio: Liden Films
- Licensed by: Crunchyroll
- Original network: Tokyo MX, KTV, BS11, AT-X
- Original run: July 2, 2018 – October 1, 2018
- Episodes: 13
- icon

Hanebado! (Japanese: はねバド!), also known as The Badminton Play of Ayano Hanesaki! or Hanebad!, is a Japanese manga series by Kōsuke Hamada. It was serialized in Kodansha's seinen manga magazine Good! Afternoon from June 2013 to October 2019, with its chapters collected in 16 tankōbon volumes. An anime television series adaptation produced by Liden Films aired from July to October 2018.

== Plot ==
In the sporting world of badminton, Uchika Hanesaki was a reigning champion. Her daughter Ayano would follow her mother and trained with Uchika for many years. One day in her middle school Ayano caught a cold before an important badminton match and subsequently lost, causing Uchika to leave her and Ayano to be raised by her grandparents. Her mother leaving resulted in Ayano being depressed and she stopped playing badminton at a competitive level. Now as Ayano is in her first year in high school, she is recruited by former player Kentaro Tachibana to join the badminton club. While there, she learns to overcome her fears from playing badminton again.

== Characters ==
=== Kitakomachi High School ===
Ayano Hanesaki (羽咲 綾乃, Hanesaki Ayano)
Voiced by: Hitomi Ōwada (Japanese); Amber Lee Connors (English)
A first year in high school and a shy badminton player. When she is spoken to, Elena often comes on her side. In one instance; When Kentaro was scouting for badminton members to join the team's club, while he saw Ayano climbed up a tree.
Nagisa Aragaki (荒垣 なぎさ, Aragaki Nagisa)
Voiced by: Miyuri Shimabukuro (Japanese); Dawn M. Bennett (English)
A third year in high school and the team's badminton captain.
Riko Izumi (泉 理子, Izumi Riko)
Voiced by: Yuuna Mimura (Japanese); Jill Harris (English)
A third year in high school and the team's vice-captain.
Elena Fujisawa (藤沢 エレナ, Fujisawa Erena)
Voiced by: Konomi Kohara (Japanese); Sarah Wiedenheft (English)
A first year in high school and the badminton club's manager as well as Ayano's childhood friend, and classmate.
Kentaro Tachibana (立花 健太郎, Tachibana Kentarō)
Voiced by: Nobuhiko Okamoto (Japanese); Kyle Igneczi (English)
The coach of the women's badminton club.
Miyako Tarōmaru (太郎丸 美也子, Tarōmaru Miyako)
Voiced by: Mikako Komatsu (Japanese); Katelyn Barr (English)
The badminton club's advisor.

=== Konan High School ===
Kaoruko Serigaya (芹ヶ谷 薫子, Serigaya Kaoruko)
Voiced by: Asami Shimoda (Japanese); Mikaela Krantz (English)
Ayano's rival during their middle school days and a member of the Konan High School badminton club.

=== Fredericia Girls High School ===
Connie Christensen (コニー・クリステンセン, Konī Kurisutensen)
Voiced by: Mariya Ise (Japanese); Ariel Graham (English)
A badminton player from Denmark, who was trained by Uchika Hanesaki and a member of the Fredericia girls badminton club. She meets Ayano by a river, after she ran away from the training camp. They went by a flower shop to look around. When Ayano's phone rang, she overheard her name on the phone, which surprised Connie.
Yuika Shiwahime (志波姫 唯華, Shiwahime Yuika)
Voiced by: Ai Kayano (Japanese); Mallorie Rodak (English)
A third year and the captain of a rival high school badminton club, Fredericia.

=== Zushi Sogo High School ===
Nozomi Ishizawa (石澤 望, Ishizawa Nozomi)
Voiced by: Arisa Sakuraba (Japanese); Lynsey Hale (English)
She was Riko's middle school friend and a semifinalist from a past badminton tournament.

=== Others ===
Uchika Hanesaki (羽咲 有千夏, Hanesaki Uchika)
Voiced by: Sayaka Ōhara (Japanese); Colleen Clinkenbeard (English)
A retired badminton champion and Ayano's mother. Before she retired, her name was Uchika Shindo.

== Media ==
=== Manga ===
Written and illustrated by Kōsuke Hamada, Hanebado! was serialized in the manga anthology Good! Afternoon from June 7, 2013, to October 7, 2019. The chapters were collected in 16 tankōbon volumes by Kodansha.

=== Novel ===
A novel was released on June 29, 2018. The story begins a year before the events in the manga.

No.	Release date	ISBN
1	June 29, 2018	978-4-06-512573-1
Prologue Hayaku saka ba hayaku chiru (早く咲かば早く散る); 1. Aru Nichijō no Hajimari (ある日常の始まり); 2. Shōjo no Hibi (少女の日々); 3. Sono mebae (その芽生え); 4. Yakusoku (約束); Epilogue Sorezore no Ibasho (それぞれの居場所)

=== Anime ===
An anime television series adaptation aired from July 2 (Note: Tokyo MX listed the show at 24:00 on July 1, which is at midnight on July 2, 2018.) to October 1, 2018, on Tokyo MX and other channels. It ran for 13 episodes. The series is directed by Shinpei Ezaki and written by Taku Kishimoto, with animation by Liden Films. Satoshi Kimura provided the character designs, and Tatsuya Kato composed the music. The opening theme is "Futari no Hane" (ふたりの羽根) by Yurika, and the ending theme is "High Stepper" (ハイステッパー, Hai Suteppā) by Yuiko Ōhara.

The production was affected by the 2018 Hokkaido earthquake: the photography studio is located in Sapporo and was without power following the earthquake, making it impossible for the staff to continue working until electricity is fully restored. As a result, episode 11 of the show was delayed, with a new broadcast date yet to be decided. The show resumed on September 17, 2018, after being delayed for a week.

Crunchyroll streamed the series with original Japanese audio and English subtitles, while Funimation streamed it with an English dub.

== Reception ==
By December 2018, the manga had over 1.6 million copies in circulation.

== See also ==
- Re Cervin, another manga series by the same author
