= F (manga) =

Japanese manga and anime series

- First tankōbon volume cover
- Genre: Motorsports
- Manga
- Written by: Noboru Rokuda
- Published by: Shogakukan
- Magazine: Big Comic Spirits
- Original run: 1986 – 1992
- Volumes: 28
- Anime television series
- Directed by: Koichi Mashimo
- Produced by: Yoshinobu Nakao; Yoko Matsushita; Satoru Suzuki; Makoto Kubo
- Written by: Hideo Takayashiki
- Music by: Katz Hoshi; Wataru Yahagi
- Studio: Studio Deen
- Original network: FNS (Fuji TV)
- Original run: March 9, 1988 – December 23, 1988
- Episodes: 31
- Manga

F Regeneration Ruri
- Written by: Noboru Rokuda
- Published by: Sanei; Shueisha (compiled volumes)
- Magazine: Weekly Autosport
- Original run: June 2002 – March 2006
- Volumes: 12
- Manga

F Final
- Written by: Noboru Rokuda
- Published by: Kodansha BC; Futabasha (compiled volumes)
- Magazine: Best Car
- Original run: September 26, 2009 – September 26, 2011
- Volumes: 3
- Manga

F Complete
- Written by: Noboru Rokuda
- Published by: Beaglee
- Magazine: Manga Ōkoku
- Original run: December 25, 2020 – present
- icon

F is a Japanese manga series written and illustrated by Noboru Rokuda. It was serialized in Shogakukan's seinen manga magazine Big Comic Spirits from 1986 to 1992, with its chapters collected in 28 tankōbon volumes. The story follows Gunma Akagi, a country boy who fulfills his dream by racing in a Formula One car. The series has been followed by F Regeneration Ruri (2002–2006), F Final (2009–2011), and Final Complete (since 2020).

A 31-episode anime television series adaptation, animated by Studio Deen, was broadcast on Fuji TV from March to December 1988.

In 1991, F won the 36th Shogakukan Manga Award in the general category.

== Plot ==
Gunma Akagi is the rebellious son of Soichiro Akagi, the powerful head of the Akagi Group conglomerate. Raised as the son of a mistress, Gunma runs away from home with his friend Tamotsu Oishi, a talented mechanic, to pursue a career in formula racing. Beginning in the entry-level FJ1600 series, Gunma quickly demonstrates exceptional driving talent and advances through the ranks of professional racing, competing in the All Japan F3 Championship and later on the international stage.

As Gunma continues his climb toward Formula One, he experiences a series of personal tragedies, including the death of people close to him and the discovery that his former lover Yuki had secretly supported his racing career before becoming involved in a deadly power struggle within the Akagi Group. Gunma later moves to Europe to compete in Formula 3000, facing fierce rivals before eventually joining an F1 team formed by his allies.

== Characters ==
Gunma Akagi (赤木 軍馬, Akagi Gunma)
Voiced by: Toshihiko Seki
Tamotsu Oishi (大石 タモツ, Ōishi Tamotsu)
Voiced by: Shinnosuke Furumoto
Junko Komori (小森 純子, Komori Junko)
Voiced by: Sakiko Tamagawa
Soichirou Akagi (赤木 総一郎, Akagi Sōichirō)
Voiced by: Hiroshi Ito
Kazuto Hijiri (聖 一人, Hijiri Kazuto)
Voiced by: Hirotaka Suzuoki
Sayuri Komori (小森 さゆり, Komori Sayuri)
Voiced by: Kazue Takahashi
Shoma Akagi (赤木 将馬, Akagi Shōma)
Voiced by: Kiyoyuki Yanada
Yuma Akagi (赤木 雄馬, Akagi Yūma)
Voiced by: Kōji Tsujitani
Ruiko (ルイ子)
Voiced by: Rei Sakuma
Kinoshita (木下)
Voiced by: Shigeru Chiba
Goro Takemura (武村 五郎, Takemura Gorō)
Voiced by: Akio Otsuka
Hideo Kishida (岸田 秀夫, Kishida Hideo)
Voiced by: Tōru Furuya
Yasuda (安田)
Voiced by: Yō Yoshimura
Yuki (ユキ)
Voiced by: Youko Mizutani

== Media ==
=== Manga ===
Written and illustrated by Noboru Rokuda, F was serialized in Shogakukan's seinen manga magazine Big Comic Spirits from 1986 to 1992. Shogakukan collected its chapters in 28 tankōbon volumes, released from June 1986 to January 1993.

A second series, titled F Regeneration Ruri (F REGENERATION 瑠璃), was serialized in Sanei's Weekly Autosport from June 2002 to March 2006. Shueisha collected its chapters in 12 tankōbon volumes, released from April 18, 2003, to December 19, 2006.

A third series, titled F Final, was serialized in Kodansha BC's Best Car from September 26, 2009, to September 26, 2011. Futabasha collected its chapters in three tankōbon volumes, released on June 28 and July 12, 2013.

A fourth series, F Complete started publication on Beaglee's Manga Ōkoku website on December 25, 2020.

=== Anime ===
A 31-episode anime television series adaptation, animated by Studio Deen, was broadcast on Fuji TV from March 9 to December 23, 1988. For the first 21 episodes, the opening theme is "F" by the Burst and the ending theme song is "Jama wa Sasenai" (邪魔はさせない) by Hiroshi. For episodes 22–31, the second opening theme is "Love Affair" by Kojiro Shimizu and the second ending theme is "You Are My Energy" by Shinji Harada.

==== Episodes ====
No.	Title	Directed by	Storyboarded by	Animation directed by	Original release date
1	"Formula 1 Dream! I'm the Fastest in the World!!"; Transliteration: "Yume wa F1! Ore wa Sekai Saisoku!! Nanpito mo Ore no Mae wo Hashirasene" (Japanese: 夢はF1! 俺は世界最速!!なんぴとも俺の前を走らせねェ)	Takaaki Ishiyama	Kōichi Mashimo	Masaki Kudo	March 9, 1988
2	"The Idiot's Resolution: I'm Goin' to Tokyo..."; Transliteration: "Saitei Otoko no Ketsui: Ora Tokyo sa Iku da!" (Japanese: サイテー男の決意 オラ東京サ行くだ！)	Katsuyoshi Yatabe	Katsuyoshi Yatabe	Naohito Takahashi	March 16, 1988
3	"Dear Tamotsu! There Are a Lot of Beautiful Girls in Tokyo!"; Transliteration: "Zenryaku Tamotsu-dono! Tokyo wa Bijo Bakari Daze..." (Japanese: 前略タモツ殿！東京は美女ばかりだゼ…)	Koji Sawai	Koji Sawai	Atsuko Nakajima	March 23, 1988
4	"Double-dealing His Friendship: Still His Dream Is to Be the Best in the World!"; Transliteration: "Otoko no Yuujou Uraomote Soredemo Yume wa Sekaiichi" (Japanese: 男の友情ウラオモテ それでも夢は世界一)	Kunihisa Sugishima	Takaaki Ishiyama	Masaaki Kannan	April 13, 1988
5	"Junko's Private Lesson! Now I've Got My License"; Transliteration: "Junko no Kojin Jugyou! Kore de Menkyo mo Ore no Mono" (Japanese: 純子の個人授業！これで免許も俺のモノ)	Yoriyasu Kogawa	Yoriyasu Kogawa	Atsuko Nakajima	April 20, 1988
6	"Junko's Love! He's the Guy Who Saw the Limit of Speed"; Transliteration: "Junko no Ai! Kare wa Kyokugen Omita Speed Yarou" (Japanese: 純子の愛！ 彼は極限を見たスピード野郎)	Kunihisa Sugishima	Kōichi Mashimo	Masaaki Kannan	May 11, 1988
7	"The Wandering Young Woman Yuki..."; Transliteration: "Sasurai no Shoujo Yuki Ai Suru Hito wa Anata..." (Japanese: さすらいの少女ユキ 愛する人はあなた…)	Katsuyoshi Yatabe	Katsuyoshi Yatabe	Masaki Kudo	May 18, 1988
8	"Clash! Gunma vs. Hijiri! The Accelerators Cry!"; Transliteration: "Gekitotsu! Gunma x Hiziri!! Accel mo Naiteruze" (Japanese: 激突！軍馬×聖!!アクセルも泣いてるゼ)	Koji Sawai	Koji Sawai	Naohito Takahashi	May 25, 1988
9	"I Am a Genius! Gunma's Knockout Drive!!"; Transliteration: "Tensai wa Ore da! Deta Gunma no Hissatsu Drive!!" (Japanese: 天才は俺だ！出た軍馬の必殺ドライブ!!)	Katsuyoshi Yatabe	Takaaki Ishiyama	Masaki Kudo	June 1, 1988
10	"Gunma's in a Pinch! Rival Hiziri Approaches Tamotsu"; Transliteration: "Gunma Pinch! Rival Hijiri ga Tamotsu ni Sekkin" (Japanese: 軍馬ピンチ！ライバル聖がタモツに接近)	Yoriyasu Kogawa	Yoriyasu Kogawa	Atsuko Nakajima	June 8, 1988
11	"The Storm of Tsukuba Circuit, Another Genius Appears"; Transliteration: "Arashi no Tsukuba Circuit Mou Ichinin no Tensai Shutsugen" (Japanese: 嵐の筑波サーキット もう一人の天才出現)	Koji Sawai	Koji Sawai	Masaaki Kannan	June 22, 1988
12	"The Blaze of Elimination Matches! Aim for the Pole Position!"; Transliteration: "Honoo no Yosenkai! Proposition wo Nerae!!" (Japanese: 炎の予選会！ポールポジションを狙え!!)	Katsuyoshi Yatabe	Katsuyoshi Yatabe	Masaki Kudo	June 29, 1988
13	"Finally a Decisive Match! Gunma vs. Hiziri, the Ultimate Dead Heat"; Transliteration: "Tsui ni Kessen! Gumna x Hijiri Kyokugen no Dead Heat" (Japanese: 遂に決戦！軍馬×聖 極限のデッドヒート)	Kunihisa Sugishima	Kunihisa Sugishima	Naohito Takahashi	July 6, 1988
14	"Goodbye, Gunma! Rival Hiziri Announces His Step-up to Formula 3"; Transliteration: "Saraba Gunma! Rival Hijiri no F3 Shinshutsu Sengen" (Japanese: さらば軍馬！ ライバル聖のF3進出宣言)	Yoriyasu Kogawa	Yoriyasu Kogawa	Masaaki Kannan	July 20, 1988
15	"Tokyo Is Blown Away! Gunma's Secret Part-time Operations"; Transliteration: "Tokyo wo Buttobase! Gunma no Maruhi Baito Sakusen" (Japanese: 東京をぶっとばせ！軍馬の秘（まるひ）バイト作戦)	Koji Sawai	Koji Sawai	Atsuko Nakajima	July 27, 1988
16	"Gunma Returns Home! He Learns an Unbelievable Secret"; Transliteration: "Gunma no Kikyou! Kare wo Matsu Tondemonai Himitsu" (Japanese: 軍馬の帰郷！彼を待つとんでもない秘密)	Shinji Takagi	Kōichi Mashimo	Yoshio Mizumura	August 3, 1988
17	"Farewell Hometown! Gunma Runs Towards Tomorrow!"; Transliteration: "Kokyou to no Ketsubetsu! Gunma Ashita ni Mukatte Hashire!!" (Japanese: 故郷との決別！軍馬明日に向って走れ!!)	Chisato Shigeki	Tamiko Kojima	Masaki Kudo	August 10, 1988
18	"Tamotsu Is Shaken! Hiziri Conceals a Horrible Secret"; Transliteration: "Yureru Tamotsu! Hijiri ni Kakusareta Osoroshii Himitsu" (Japanese: 揺れるタモツ！聖に隠された恐ろしい秘密)	Kunihisa Sugishima	Kunihisa Sugishima	Naohito Takahashi	August 17, 1988
19	"He Really Is a Genius? Gunma Runs Amok"; Transliteration: "Yappari Tensai? Gunma Bucchigiri no Daibakusou" (Japanese: やっぱり天才？軍馬ぶっちぎりの大爆走)	Koji Sawai	Koji Sawai	Masaaki Kannan	August 31, 1988
20	"Short Lived First Victory! Tamotsu's Betrayal"; Transliteration: "Tsuka no Ma no Hatsu Yuushou! Shinyuu Tamotsu no Uragiri" (Japanese: つかのまの初優勝！親友タモツの裏切り)	Tetsuya Endo	Kōichi Mashimo	Atsuko Nakajima	September 21, 1988
21	"Desert-colored Heart? Gunma Makes His Second Start Alone"; Transliteration: "Kokoro wa Sabaku Shoku? Gunma wa Hitorikiri no Sai Start" (Japanese: 心は砂漠色？軍馬は一人きりの再スタート)	Koji Sawai	Koji Sawai	Naohito Takahashi	September 28, 1988
22	"Has Tamotsu Returned? Gunma's Dramatic Change"; Transliteration: "Kaette Kita Tamotsu? Gunma Baribari Daikyakuten" (Japanese: 帰ってきたタモツ？軍馬バリバリ大逆転)	Tetsuya Endo	Koji Sawai	Masaaki Kannan	October 21, 1988
23	"Gunma vs. Hiziri!! I Am the Champ!"; Transliteration: "Suzuka de Gekitotsu! Gunma x Hijiri!! Ore ga Champ da" (Japanese: 鈴鹿で激突！軍馬×聖!!俺がチャンプだ)	Yoriyasu Kogawa	Kōichi Mashimo	Masaki Kudo	October 28, 1988
24	"Gunma's Winning Everything! Finally, an Invitation to F-3..."; Transliteration: "Rensen Renshou no Gunma! Tsui ni F3 e no Shoutai ga..." (Japanese: 連戦連勝の軍馬！遂にF3への招待が…)	Kunihisa Sugishima	Kunihisa Sugishima	Naohito Takahashi	November 4, 1988
25	"Gunma Also Gives Up? The Tomboy Rides an F-3"; Transliteration: "Gunma mo Oteage? Jajauma F3 ni Noru" (Japanese: 軍馬もお手上げ？じゃじゃ馬F3に乗る)	Tetsuya Endo	Kōichi Mashimo	Atsuko Nakajima	November 11, 1988
26	"Just Before the F3 Debut Gunma's Visited by the Black Devil's Hand"; Transliteration: "F3 Debut Chokuzen Gunma wo Osou Kuroi Ma no Te" (Japanese: F3デビュー直前 軍馬を襲う黒い魔の手)	Koji Sawai	Koji Sawai	Masaki Kudo	November 18, 1988
27	"Gunma's License Is Taken by Force, He Can't Run!"; Transliteration: "License Hakudatsu Mou Gunma wa Hashirenai!" (Japanese: ライセンスはく奪 もう軍馬は走れない！)	Yoriyasu Kogawa	Yoriyasu Kogawa	Atsuko Nakajima	November 25, 1988
28	"Hiziri's Disease Creeps Closer, but I Am Not Afraid of Death"; Transliteration: "Hijiri ni Shinobiyoru Byouma de mo Ore wa Shi wo Osorenai" (Japanese: 聖に忍び寄る病魔 でも俺は死を恐れない)	Tetsuya Endo	Kunihisa Sugishima	Masaki Kudo	December 2, 1988
29	"Gunma Draws the Line! A Man Shouldn't Depend on the Enemy's Compassion"; Transliteration: "Gunma no Kejime! Otoko wa Teki no Nasake ni Amaenai" (Japanese: 軍馬のケジメ！男は敵の情けに甘えない)	Koji Sawai	Koji Sawai	Atsuko Nakajima	December 9, 1988
30	"Gunma vs. Hiziri! Final Countdown"; Transliteration: "Gunma Vs Hijiri! Final Countdown" (Japanese: 軍馬VS聖！ファイナルカウントダウン)	Yoriyasu Kogawa	Yoriyasu Kogawa	Atsuko Nakajima	December 16, 1988
31	"Farewell Gunma! Rise Fastest Man in the World!!"; Transliteration: "Saraba Gunma! Mezase Sekai Saisoku no Otoko!!" (Japanese: さらば軍馬！めざせ世界最速の男!!)	Koji Sawai	Koji Sawai	Masaki Kudo	December 23, 1988

== Reception ==
In 1991, F won the 36th Shogakukan Manga Award in the general category.
