= Ushijima the Loan Shark =

Japanese manga series

- First tankōbon volume cover

闇金ウシジマくん (Yamikin Ushijima-kun)
- Manga
- Written by: Shohei Manabe
- Published by: Shogakukan
- Magazine: Weekly Big Comic Spirits
- Original run: May 10, 2004 – March 4, 2019
- Volumes: 46
Further information
Television drama
Directed by	Masatoshi Yamaguchi
Written by	Masahiro Fukuma
Original network	TBS, MBS
Original run	October 12, 2010 – September 18, 2016
Episodes	27
Live-action film
Directed by	Masatoshi Yamaguchi
Written by	Masahiro Fukuma; Masatoshi Yamaguchi
Music by	Superfly
Released	August 25, 2012
Runtime	129 minutes
Live-action film
Ushijima the Loan Shark Part 2
Directed by	Masatoshi Yamaguchi
Written by	Masahiro Fukuma; Masatoshi Yamaguchi
Music by	Superfly
Released	May 14, 2014
Runtime	133 minutes
Live-action film
Ushijima the Loan Shark Part 3
Directed by	Masatoshi Yamaguchi
Written by	Masahiro Fukuma; Masatoshi Yamaguchi
Music by	Superfly
Released	September 22, 2016
Runtime	131 minutes
Live-action film
Ushijima the Loan Shark The Final
Directed by	Masatoshi Yamaguchi
Written by	Masahiro Fukuma; Masatoshi Yamaguchi
Music by	Superfly
Released	October 22, 2016
Runtime	130 minutes
Manga
Nikumamushi Densetsu
Written by	Yū Hayato
Published by	Shogakukan
Magazine	Yawaraka Spirits
Original run	February 2017 – present
Volumes	16
Manga
Gaiden: Ramen Namerikawa-san
Written by	Ōdō Yamazaki
Published by	Shogakukan
Magazine	Yawaraka Spirits
Original run	December 7, 2017 – March 4, 2019
Volumes	5
Manga
Shōnen-in Ushijima-kun
Written by	Ōdō Yamazaki
Published by	Shogakukan
Magazine	MangaONE
Original run	January 30, 2023 – present
Volumes	6
Manga
Naniwa Time Slip Aizawa-kun
Written by	Satoshi Sasasani
Published by	Shogakukan
Magazine	Monthly Big Comic Spirits
Original run	April 26, 2024 – present
Volumes	3
Manga
Namerikawa-Gumi Yakuza Meshi
Written by	Youichi
Published by	Shogakukan
Magazine	Yawaraka Spirits
Original run	March 24, 2025 – present
Volumes	1
- icon

Ushijima the Loan Shark (Japanese: 闇金ウシジマくん, Hepburn: Yamikin Ushijima-kun) is a Japanese manga series by Shohei Manabe. The series was serialized in Shogakukan's Weekly Big Comic Spirits magazine from May 2004 to May 2019. It was adapted into a live action television drama series in 2010 and into a live action film in 2012. A second live action film, Ushijima the Loan Shark 2, was released on May 16, 2014. Two other live action films, Ushijima the Loan Shark 3, and Ushijima the Loan Shark The Final have also been released.

In 2011, the series won the 56th Shogakukan Manga Award for general manga.

== Plot ==
Cow Cow Finance is an unlicensed moneylending operation that offers loans at exorbitant interest rates of 50% over ten days. The company recruits Takada, a former host, as a new employee. Under the cold and ruthless leadership of its president, Kaoru Ushijima, Takada initially struggles with fear and unease. However, he gradually adapts to the harsh environment, working alongside senior employees to issue loans and collect debts.

Every day, desperate individuals—people with no means to secure their next meal—flood the office, seeking financial relief. The story follows the relentless and often brutal world of underground finance, where both lenders and borrowers are trapped in a cycle of exploitation and survival.

== Characters ==
- Takayuki Yamada (TV drama and film) as Kaoru Ushijima
- Nana Katase (TV drama and film) as Chiaki Okubo
- Kyosuke Yabe (TV drama and film) as Ezaki
- Hiromi Sakimoto (TV drama and film) as Takada
- Jessica Kizaki (TV drama and film) as Moko

== Media ==
=== Manga ===
Written and illustrated by Shohei Manabe, Ushijima the Loan Shark was serialized in Shogakukan's seinen manga magazine Weekly Big Comic Spirits from May 10, 2004, to March 4, 2019. Shogakukan collected its chapters in forty-six tankōbon volumes, released from July 30, 2004, to May 30, 2019.

A spin-off manga by Yū Hayato, titled Nikumamushi Densetsu, began serialization on Shogakukan's Yawaraka Spirits manga service in February 2017.

A spin-off manga by Ōdō Yamazaki, titled Gaiden: Ramen Namerikawa-san, was serialized on the Yawaraka Spirits manga service between December 2017 and May 2019.

Another spin-off manga by Ōdō Yamazaki, titled Shōnen-in Ushijima-kun, began serialization on Shogakukan's MangaONE app on January 30, 2023.

A spin-off manga by Satoshi Sasasani, titled Naniwa Time Slip Aizawa-kun, began serialization in Shogakukan's Monthly Big Comic Spirits on April 26, 2024. The spin-off centers around Aizawa time traveling to the 90s.

A spin-off manga by Youichi, titled Namerikawa-Gumi Yakuza Meshi, began serialization on Yawaraka Spirits on March 24, 2025.

=== Drama ===
In 2010, the manga series was adapted into a TV drama.

=== Film ===
In 2012, the manga was adapted into a live-action film, with the cast and staff from the TV drama reprising their roles.

== Reception ==
In 2011, the series won the 56th Shogakukan Manga Award in the general category.

By March 2022, the manga had over 21 million copies in circulation.
