= Afro Tanaka =

Japanese manga series

- Cover of Kōkō Afro Tanaka volume 1

アフロ田中 (Afuro Tanaka)
- Genre: Comedy
- Manga
- Written by: Masaharu Noritsuke
- Published by: Shogakukan
- Magazine: Weekly Big Comic Spirits
- Original run: December 3, 2001 – present
- Volumes: 65
- Series titles
- 1. Kōkō Afro Tanaka (2001–2004, 10 volumes); 2. Chūtai Afro Tanaka (2004–2007, 10 volumes); 3. Jōkyō Afro Tanaka (2007–2010, 10 volumes); 4. Sasurai Afro Tanaka (2010–2013, 10 volumes); 5. Shiawase Afro Tanaka (2015–2018, 10 volumes); 6. Kekkon Afro Tanaka (2018–2021, 10 volumes); 7. My Home Afro Tanaka (2022–present, 5 volumes)
- Live-action film
- Directed by: Daigo Matsui
- Written by: Masafumi Nishida
- Released: February 18, 2012
- Runtime: 114 minutes
- icon

Afro Tanaka (Japanese: アフロ田中, Hepburn: Afuro Tanaka) is a Japanese manga series written and illustrated by Masaharu Noritsuke. It follows a 24-year-old Afro-haired young man named Hiroshi Tanaka who falls in love for the first time. It has been serialized in Shogakukan's seinen manga magazine Weekly Big Comic Spirits since 2001, spawning seven series. A live action film adaptation premiered in February 2012.

== Plot ==
Hiroshi Tanaka, a naïve and socially awkward young man, is known for his distinctive afro hairstyle, as he navigates life from adolescence into adulthood. The story begins with Tanaka as a high school student and continues through his decision to drop out, his time working part-time jobs in his hometown, and his eventual move to Tokyo, where he takes on demanding work while trying to adjust to city life.

The narrative is episodic, focusing on Tanaka's daily experiences with friends, coworkers, and acquaintances, often revolving around his attempts to build relationships, particularly with women, despite his frequent misunderstandings and lack of confidence. His interactions with a consistent group of male friends highlight their shared struggles with romance, work, and personal growth, often resulting in comedic situations driven by their immaturity and frustrations.

== Media ==
=== Manga ===
Written and illustrated by Masaharu Noritsuke, the Afro Tanaka series has been serialized in Shogakukan's seinen manga magazine Weekly Big Comic Spirits since December 3, 2001. It has been divided into seven parts:

- Kōkō Afro Tanaka (高校アフロ田中, Kōkō Afuro Tanaka; lit. 'High School Afro Tanaka') (2001–2004, 10 volumes)
- Chūtai Afro Tanaka (中退アフロ田中, Chūtai Afuro Tanaka; lit. 'Dropout Afro Tanaka') (2004–2007, 10 volumes)
- Jōkyō Afro Tanaka (上京アフロ田中, Jōkyō Afuro Tanaka; lit. 'Tokyo-Bound Afro Tanaka') (2007–2010, 10 volumes)
- Sasurai Afro Tanaka (さすらいアフロ田中, Sasurai Afuro Tanaka; lit. 'Wandering Afro Tanaka') (2010–2013, 10 volumes)
- Shiawase Afro Tanaka (しあわせアフロ田中, Shiawase Afuro Tanaka; lit. 'Happy Afro Tanaka') (2015–2018, 10 volumes)
- Kekkon Afro Tanaka (結婚アフロ田中, Kekkon Afuro Tanaka; lit. 'Marriage Afro Tanaka') (2018–2021, 10 volumes)
- My Home Afro Tanaka (マイホーム アフロ田中, Mai Hōmu Afuro Tanaka) (2022–present; 5 volumes)

=== Film ===
A film directed by Daigo Matsui, based on Jōkyō Afro Tanaka story was released on February 18, 2012, by Showgate. The theme song of the film is "Yoru wo Koete" by Tsuru. Afro Tanaka was released in DVD and Blu-ray by Happinet on August 2, 2012. The film also spawned a spin-off, a 10-episodes mini-drama entitled Hōkago Afro Tanaka.

== Reception ==
The Afro Tanaka manga has sold 3.6 million units in Japan by May 2013. In 2008, the third manga series, Jōkyō Afro Tanaka, was nominated in the manga category at the 12th Japan Media Arts Festival Awards. The film debuted at number 10 in Japanese theaters. Afro Tanaka grossed over $1.8 million in Japan.
