= Kedamame =

Japanese manga series

- First volume cover

ケダマメ
- Genre: Adventure; Historical; Supernatural
- Manga
- Written by: Yukio Tamai
- Published by: Shogakukan
- Magazine: Weekly Big Comic Spirits
- Original run: August 25, 2014 – August 10, 2015
- Volumes: 4
- icon

Kedamame (ケダマメ) is a Japanese manga series written and illustrated by Yukio Tamai. It was serialized in Shogakukan's seinen manga magazine Weekly Big Comic Spirits from August 2014 to August 2015, with its chapters collected in four tankōbon volumes.

== Plot ==
In 1246 Japan under the Kamakura shogunate, a traveling troupe of performers arrives in Kamakura. The group includes elder Kugutsu, dancers Kyara and Mayu, and Kokemaru, a one-armed jester who wears cat-like makeup and speaks in nonsense. Though appearing harmless, Kokemaru secretly protects the dancers using a strange power emanating from his severed limb. Meanwhile, investigator Toura and his assistant Konpei track a serial killer murdering prostitutes with claw-like wounds. Their investigation leads them to suspect Kokemaru's involvement, uncovering dark secrets about the jester's true nature and connection to the crimes.

== Publication ==
Written and illustrated by Yukio Tamai, Kedamame was serialized in Shogakukan's seinen manga magazine Weekly Big Comic Spirits from August 25, 2014, to August 10, 2015. Shogakukan collected its chapters in four tankōbon volumes, released from December 26, 2014, to September 30, 2015.

=== Volumes ===
No.	Japanese release date	Japanese ISBN
1	December 26, 2014	978-4-09-186680-6
2	March 30, 2015	978-4-09-186809-1
3	July 30, 2015	978-4-09-187145-9
4	September 30, 2015	978-4-09-187219-7
