= Peach Milk Crown =

Japanese manga series

- First tankōbon volume cover

ピーチ・ミルク・クラウン (Pīchi Miruku Kuraun)
- Genre: Coming-of-age; Romance; Sports
- Manga
- Written by: Kazunori Tahara
- Published by: Shogakukan
- Magazine: Weekly Big Comic Spirits
- Original run: January 22, 2018 – February 9, 2019
- Volumes: 4
- icon

Peach Milk Crown (Japanese: ピーチ・ミルク・クラウン, Hepburn: Pīchi Miruku Kuraun) is a Japanese manga series written and illustrated by Kazunori Tahara. It was serialized in Shogakukan's seinen manga magazine Weekly Big Comic Spirits from January 2018 to February 2019, with its chapters collected in four tankōbon volumes.

== Publication ==
Written and illustrated by Kazunori Tahara, Peach Milk Crown was serialized in Shogakukan's seinen manga magazine Monthly Big Comic Spirits from August 27, 2009, to February 9, 2019. Shogakukan collected its chapters in four tankōbon volumes, released from April 28, 2010, to August 30, 2013.

=== Volumes ===
No.	Release date	ISBN
1	May 30, 2018	978-4-09-189873-9
2	August 30, 2018	978-4-09-860061-8
3	December 27, 2018	978-4-09-860153-0
4	April 26, 2019	978-4-09-860301-5

== See also ==
- Mill, another manga series by the same author
- Yūzora no Cruyffism, another manga series by the same author
