= Yūzora no Cruyffism =

Japanese manga series

- First tankōbon volume cover

夕空のクライフイズム (Yūzora no Kuraifuizumu)
- Genre: Sports
- Manga
- Written by: Kazunori Tahara
- Published by: Shogakukan
- Magazine: Weekly Big Comic Spirits
- Original run: December 9, 2013 – April 25, 2016
- Volumes: 10
- icon

Yūzora no Cruyffism (夕空のクライフイズム, Yūzora no Kuraifuizumu; "Evening Sky Cruyffism") is a Japanese manga series written and illustrated by Kazunori Tahara. It was serialized in Shogakukan's seinen manga magazine Weekly Big Comic Spirits from December 2013 to April 2016, with its chapters collected in ten tankōbon volumes.

== Publication ==
Written and illustrated by Kazunori Tahara, Yūzora no Cruyffism was serialized in Shogakukan's seinen manga magazine Weekly Big Comic Spirits from December 9, 2013, to April 25, 2016. Shogakukan collected its chapters in ten tankōbon volumes, released from April 30, 2014, to July 29, 2016.

=== Volumes ===
No.	Release date	ISBN
1	April 30, 2014	978-4-09-186166-5
2	July 30, 2014	978-4-09-186290-7
3	November 28, 2014	978-4-09-186599-1
4	February 27, 2015	978-4-09-186738-4
5	May 29, 2015	978-4-09-187017-9
6	September 30, 2015	978-4-09-187168-8
7	December 28, 2015	978-4-09-187364-4
8	March 30, 2016	978-4-09-187517-4
9	June 30, 2016	978-4-09-187639-3
10	July 29, 2016	978-4-09-187709-3

== See also ==
- Mill, another manga series by the same author
- Peach Milk Crown, another manga series by the same author
