= Bōkyaku no Sachiko =

Japanese manga series

- First tankōbon volume cover, featuring Sachiko Sasaki

忘却のサチコ
- Genre: Comedy, cooking
- Manga
- Written by: Jun Abe
- Published by: Shogakukan
- Imprint: Big Spirits Comics
- Magazine: Weekly Big Comic Spirits
- Original run: August 11, 2014 – present
- Volumes: 27
- Television drama
- Directed by: Santa Yamagishi; Sōichi Ishii; Kazumasa Nemoto
- Written by: Santa Yamagishi; Satomi Ooshima; Kyōko Inukai
- Music by: Hiroyasu Yano
- Original network: TV Tokyo
- Original run: October 13, 2018 – December 29, 2018
- Episodes: 12
- icon

Bōkyaku no Sachiko (Japanese: 忘却のサチコ; lit. 'Forgetful Sachiko') is a Japanese manga series written and illustrated by Jun Abe. It has been serialized in Shogakukan's seinen manga magazine Weekly Big Comic Spirits since August 2014, with its chapters collected in 26 tankōbon volumes as of March 2026. It was adapted into a 12-episode television drama broadcast on TV Tokyo from October to December 2018.

== Media ==
=== Manga ===
Written and illustrated by Jun Abe, Bōkyaku no Sachiko started in Shogakukan's seinen manga magazine Weekly Big Comic Spirits on August 11, 2014. Shogakukan has collected its chapters into individual tankōbon volumes. The first volume was released on December 26, 2014. As of October 30, 2026, 27 volumes have been released.

==== Volumes ====
No.	Japanese release date	Japanese ISBN
1	December 26, 2014	978-4-09-186670-7
2	April 30, 2015	978-4-09-186880-0
3	August 28, 2015	978-4-09-187175-6
4	November 30, 2015	978-4-09-187337-8
5	February 12, 2016	978-4-09-187469-6
6	May 30, 2016	978-4-09-187616-4
7	August 30, 2016	978-4-09-187734-5
8	November 30, 2016	978-4-09-189239-3
9	March 30, 2017	978-4-09-189402-1
10	June 30, 2017	978-4-09-189534-9
11	March 29, 2019	978-4-09-189639-1
12	September 30, 2019	978-4-09-860409-8
13	January 30, 2020	978-4-09-860529-3
14	June 30, 2020	978-4-09-860642-9
15	December 25, 2020	978-4-09-860789-1
16	June 30, 2021	978-4-09-861049-5
17	November 30, 2021	978-4-09-861189-8
18	May 30, 2022	978-4-09-861338-0
19	December 12, 2022	978-4-09-861481-3
20	May 30, 2023	978-4-09-861708-1
21	December 27, 2023	978-4-09-862621-2
22	April 30, 2024	978-4-09-862798-1
23	October 30, 2024	978-4-09-863058-5
24	March 28, 2025	978-4-09-863374-6
25	October 30, 2025	978-4-09-863620-4
26	March 30, 2026	978-4-09-863872-7
27	October 30, 2026	978-4-09-864146-8

=== Drama ===
A television drama special, starring Mitsuki Takahata as Sachiko Sasaki, aired on TV Tokyo on January 2, 2018. A 12-episode drama aired on TV Tokyo from October 13 to December 29, 2018. (Note: Broadcast on Saturday at 00:12 a.m.) Another special aired on TV Tokyo on January 2, 2020.

== Reception ==
Bōkyaku no Sachiko ranked third on the first annual Tsutaya Comic Awards' Next Break Division in 2017.
