= Bushi-Stant Aisaka-kun! =

Japanese manga series

- First tankōbon volume cover

武士スタント逢坂くん! (Bushi Sutanto Aisaka-kun!)
- Genre: Comedy
- Manga
- Written by: Nobuo Yokoyama
- Published by: Shogakukan
- Magazine: Weekly Big Comic Spirits
- Original run: November 11, 2019 – April 12, 2021
- Volumes: 6
- Television drama
- Directed by: Shuhei Shibue; Kai Oe
- Written by: Fumi Tsubota
- Music by: Naoyuki Chikatani
- Original network: Nippon TV
- Original run: July 27, 2021 – September 28, 2021
- Episodes: 10

Bushi-Stant Aisaka-kun! (武士スタント逢坂くん!, Bushi Sutanto Aisaka-kun!) is a Japanese manga series written and illustrated by Nobuo Yokoyama. It was serialized in Shogakukan's seinen manga magazine Weekly Big Comic Spirits from November 2019 to April 2021, with its chapters collected in six tankōbon volumes. A ten-episode television drama adaptation was broadcast on Nippon TV from July to September 2021.

== Media ==
=== Manga ===
Written and illustrated by Nobuo Yokoyama Bushi-Stant Aisaka-kun! was serialized in Shogakukan's seinen manga magazine Weekly Big Comic Spirits from November 11, 2019, to April 12, 2021. Shogakukan collected its chapters in six tankōbon volumes, released from February 28, 2020, to June 30, 2021.

=== Volumes ===
No.	Japanese release date	Japanese ISBN
1	February 28, 2020	978-4-09-860541-5
2	April 27, 2020	978-4-09-860594-1
3	July 30, 2020	978-4-09-860678-8
4	October 30, 2020	978-4-09-860751-8
5	May 28, 2021	978-4-09-860869-0
6	June 30, 2021	978-4-09-861099-0

=== Drama ===
A ten-episode television drama adaptation was broadcast on Nippon TV from July 27 to September 28, 2021. (Note: Nippon TV listed the series air dates on Monday at 24:59, which is effectively Tuesday at 0:59 a.m. JST.) The theme song is "Kitsune Airaku" (喜努愛楽) by West.
