= Shohei Manabe =

Japanese manga artist

- Born: Chigasaki, Kanagawa, Japan
- Occupation: Manga artist
- Known for: Ushijima the Loan Shark
- Awards: Shogakukan Manga Award (2010); Japan Media Arts Festival Award (2020)

Shohei Manabe (Japanese: 真鍋昌平, Hepburn: Manabe Shōhei) is a Japanese manga artist. Writing and drawing gritty seinen manga about the Japanese underworld, he is best known for Ushijima the Loan Shark (2004–2019), which won the Shogakukan Manga Award and spawned several films and series.

== Life and work ==
Manabe was born in Chigasaki, Kanagawa, where he was inspired to become a mangaka by reading Doraemon in primary school.

His manga Smuggler (2000) was about an illegal transporter of dead bodies getting in trouble with the yakuza and the triad killers. It was adapted into a live action film in 2011.

Dead End (2001–2002), in four volumes, is a dystopian cyberpunk story where mutated humans are used as weapons.

Manabe launched Ushijima the Loan Shark in Weekly Big Comic Spirits in 2004 and ended it in March 2019, after 46 volumes. The manga depicts the life and activities of a yamikin, a Japanese loan shark, in a detailed and realistic way. During the 2010s, it was adapted into a live-action TV series, which ran for three seasons, and four live-action films.

His Sins of Kujo series has been serialized since October 2020.

== Awards ==
| Year | Award | Category | Work/Nominee | Result |
|---|---|---|---|---|
| 2008 | Tezuka Osamu Cultural Prize | | Ushijima the Loan Shark | Nominated |
| 2009 | Angoulême International Comics Festival | | Ushijima the Loan Shark | Nominated |
| 2010 | Tezuka Osamu Cultural Prize | | Ushijima the Loan Shark | Nominated |
| 2010 | Shogakukan Manga Award | General | Ushijima the Loan Shark | Won |
| 2020 | Japan Media Arts Festival | Social Impact Award | Ushijima the Loan Shark | Won |
