= Saotome Senshu, Hitakakusu =

Japanese manga series by Naoki Mizuguchi

- First tankōbon volume cover, featuring Saotome Yae

早乙女選手、ひたかくす
- Genre: Romantic comedy; Sports
- Manga
- Written by: Naoki Mizuguchi
- Published by: Shogakukan
- Magazine: Weekly Big Comic Spirits
- Original run: August 22, 2016 – October 21, 2019
- Volumes: 10
- icon

Saotome Senshu, Hitakakusu (早乙女選手、ひたかくす; 'Athlete Saotome, Keeping a Secret') is a Japanese manga series written and illustrated by Naoki Mizuguchi. It was serialized in Shogakukan's seinen manga magazine Weekly Big Comic Spirits from August 2016 to October 2019, with its chapters collected in ten tankōbon volumes.

== Plot ==
Boxing fan and high-school student Tsukishima Satoru gets confessed to by his classmate Saotome Yae, the reigning Girls' featherweight champion. Although he rejects her initially so as to not distract her from boxing, her coach appoints him as her trainer so they can date secretly. Their romance unfolds as they get to know each other as classmates and boxing partners.

== Publication ==
Written and illustrated by Naoki Mizuguchi, Saotome Senshu, Hitakakusu was serialized in Shogakukan's seinen manga magazine Weekly Big Comic Spirits from August 22, 2016, to October 21, 2019. Shogakukan collected its chapters in ten tankōbon volumes, released from December 12, 2016, to November 12, 2019.

=== Volumes ===
No.	Japanese release date	Japanese ISBN
1	December 12, 2016	978-4-09-189275-1
2	April 12, 2017	978-4-09-189428-1
3	August 10, 2017	978-4-09-189617-9
4	November 10, 2017	978-4-09-189683-4
5	March 12, 2018	978-4-09-189809-8
6	June 12, 2018	978-4-09-189884-5
7	November 12, 2018	978-4-09-860129-5
8	April 12, 2019	978-4-09-860294-0
9	July 12, 2019	978-4-09-860331-2
10	November 12, 2019	978-4-09-860480-7

== See also ==
- Mizu Polo, another manga series by Naoki Mizuguchi
