= Sensei's Pious Lie =

Japanese manga series

- Cover of the first tankōbon volume

先生の白い嘘 (Sensei no Shiroi Uso)
- Genre: Drama
- Manga
- Written by: Akane Torikai
- Published by: Kodansha
- English publisher: NA: Vertical
- Magazine: Monthly Morning Two
- Original run: August 22, 2013 – September 22, 2017
- Volumes: 8
- Live-action film
- Directed by: Kōichirō Miki
- Written by: Naoko Adachi
- Released: July 5, 2024

Sensei's Pious Lie (Japanese: 先生の白い嘘, Hepburn: Sensei no Shiroi Uso) is a Japanese manga series written and illustrated by Akane Torikai. It was serialized in Kodansha's seinen manga magazine Monthly Morning Two from August 2013 to September 2017, with its chapters collected in eight tankōbon volumes. A live-action film adaptation premiered in Japanese theaters in July 2024.

== Media ==
=== Manga ===
Written and illustrated by Akane Torikai, Sensei's Pious Lie was serialized in Kodansha's seinen manga magazine Monthly Morning Two from August 22, 2013, to September 22, 2017. Kodansha collected its chapters in eight tankōbon volumes, released from February 21, 2014, to October 23, 2017.

In North America, the manga is licensed for English release by Kodansha USA (as a Vertical title). The volumes published in omnibus format from March 1 to October 25, 2022.

==== Volumes ====
No.	Original release date	Original ISBN	English release date	English ISBN
1	February 21, 2014	978-4-06-388304-6	March 1, 2022	978-1-64729-112-9
2	September 22, 2014	978-4-06-388377-0	March 1, 2022	978-1-64729-112-9
3	March 23, 2015	978-4-06-388445-6	May 17, 2022	978-1-64729-113-6
4	October 23, 2015	978-4-06-388516-3	May 17, 2022	978-1-64729-113-6
5	May 23, 2016	978-4-06-388601-6	August 9, 2022	978-1-64729-114-3
6	November 22, 2016	978-4-06-388667-2	August 9, 2022	978-1-64729-114-3
7	May 23, 2017	978-4-06-388729-7	October 25, 2022	978-1-64729-138-9
8	October 23, 2017	978-4-06-510276-3	October 25, 2022	978-1-64729-138-9

=== Live-action film ===
A live-action film adaptation was announced on February 21, 2024. The film is directed by Kōichirō Miki, with a screenplay written by Naoko Adachi and stars Nao as Misuzu Hara. It premiered in Japanese theaters on July 5.

== Reception ==
The series ranked eighth on "The Best Manga 2015 Kono Manga wo Yome!" ranking by Freestyle magazine. It was nominated for the Sugoi Japan Award in 2017. It was nominated for the 22nd Tezuka Osamu Cultural Prize in 2018.

== See also ==
- Saturn Return, another manga series by the same author
