= Mill (manga) =

Japanese manga series

- First tankōbon volume cover

ミル (Miru)
- Manga
- Written by: Kazunori Tahara
- Published by: Shogakukan
- Magazine: Monthly Big Comic Spirits
- Original run: August 27, 2009 – July 27, 2013
- Volumes: 6
- icon

Mill (Japanese: ミル, Hepburn: Miru) is a Japanese manga series written and illustrated by Kazunori Tahara. It was serialized in Shogakukan's seinen manga magazine Monthly Big Comic Spirits from August 2009 to July 2013, with its chapters collected in six tankōbon volumes.

== Publication ==
Written and illustrated by Kazunori Tahara, Mill, Tahara's debut series, was published in Shogakukan's seinen manga magazine Monthly Big Comic Spirits from August 27, 2009, to July 27, 2013. Shogakukan collected its chapters in six tankōbon volumes, released from April 28, 2010, to August 30, 2013.

=== Volumes ===
No.	Japanese release date	Japanese ISBN
1	April 28, 2010	978-4-09-183146-0
2	January 28, 2011	978-4-09-183619-9
3	October 28, 2011	978-4-09-184123-0
4	June 29, 2012	978-4-09-184527-6
5	December 27, 2012	978-4-09-184788-1
6	August 30, 2013	978-4-09-185389-9

== See also ==
- Yūzora no Cruyffism, another manga series by the same author
- Peach Milk Crown, another manga series by the same author
