= Cinema Asia Releasing =

U.S. film distribution company

Cinema Asia Releasing is a film distribution company founded by Ko Mori of Eleven Arts and Tim Kwok of Convergence Entertainment in 2011 to spread Asian films throughout the United States.

== Filmography ==
- Heartbeat (Feature, Korea, 2010)
- Iris: The Movie (Feature, Korea, 2010)
- Midnight FM (Feature, Korea, 2010)
- Evangelion: 2.0 You Can (Not) Advance (Animation, Japan, 2011)
- The Treasure Hunter (Feature, Taiwan, 2011)
- Mindfulness and Murder (Feature, Thailand)
