= Noboru Rokuda =

Japanese manga artist (born 1952)

Noboru Rokuda (六田登, Rokuda Noboru; born July 23, 1952 in Yao, Osaka Prefecture, Japan) is a Japanese manga artist. He made his professional debut in 1978 with Saigo Test, for which he won the Shogakukan New Artist Award. He won the 1991 Shogakukan Manga Award for general manga for F.

== Works ==
Manga

- Saigo Test (最終テスト)
- Abare Taikai (あばれ大海)
- Dash Kappei (ダッシュ勝平) - The companion anime television series by Tatsunoko Production (1981–1982) is known as Gigi la Trottola in Italy and Chicho Terremoto in Spanish. Rokuda's original manga was also published on both countries due to the success of the anime series in those countries.
- Kai no Tabidachi (カイの旅立ち)
- Ryohei Shinjijou (僚平新事情)
- Youki na Kamome (陽気なカモメ)
- F (エフ)
- Twin
- Ichigo Nido Monogatari (ICHIGO 二都物語)
- Kabocha Hakusho (かぼちゃ白書)
- Kumatora Courage Track Story (クマトラ クレイジートラックストーリー)
- Baron (バロン)
- Umi ga Naku Toki (海が鳴く時)
- Young Man (ヤングマン)
- Kame Kitou Mantarou Ore to Monogatari (カメ 亀頭万太郎と俺物語)
- Sky
- Jariken - Nihonkoku Kodomo Kenpou (じゃりけん―日本国子供憲法)
- Shishi no Oukoku (獅子の王国)
- Seisei no Utage (星々の宴)
- Noboru Rokuda Collection (六田登短編集)
- Yorokobi no Hibi (歓びの日々)
- Return
- Cinema (シネマ)
- Takako (たかこ)
- Utamaro (歌麿)
- Shinai Naru M he (親愛なるMへ)
- CURA
- Senoku no Mushi (千億の蟲)
- Comic Ban Project X Chosensha Tachi (コミック版プロジェクトX挑戦者たち)
- BOX
- Nemuri Tamasaburo (眠り玉三郎)
- F Regeneration (F REGENERATION 瑠璃)
- Tanomu Kara Shizuka ni Shitekure (頼むから静かにしてくれ)
- Ganso -Juu Chikara Ansatsuken- (ガノン―十力暗殺剣―)

Books

- Letter from Kitami (novel)
- Papaiyanedokodenenne
