= Masato Hirano (voice actor) =

Japanese actor (born 1955)

- 平野 正人
- Born: November 16, 1955 (age 70); Iwate Prefecture, Japan
- Education: Tama Art University
- Occupations: Actor; voice actor; narrator
- Years active: 1970–present
- Agent: Aoni Production

Masato Hirano (平野 正人, Hirano Masato; born November 16, 1955) is a Japanese actor, voice actor and narrator from Iwate Prefecture who works for Aoni Production. Among his other roles, he has performed the characters Ippon-Matsu and Topman Warcury (One Piece), Zaku (Fist of the North Star) and Kinnikuman Big Body (Kinnikuman: Scramble for the Throne).

== Filmography ==
=== Television animation ===
1980s

- Armored Trooper Votoms (1983) (Police (C))
- Gu Gu Ganmo (1984) (Leo, Little Bird Store)
- Video Warrior Laserion (1984) (Joe, Zaki)
- Blue Comet SPT Layzner (1985) (Clayton)
- Fist of the North Star (1985) (Zaku, Giji, Red Ribbon's Military Soldier others)
- GeGeGe no Kitarō (1985) (Kasha, Werewolf, others)
- High School! Kimengumi (1985) (Soreike Minna, Tatsurō Hirōka, others)
- Mobile Suit Zeta Gundam (1985) (Haifan)
- Dragon Ball (1986) (Man Wolf, Piano, others)
- Saint Seiya (1986) (Hydra Ichi and Sea Serpent)
- Wonder Beat Scramble (1986) (Doctor Gabor)
- Akakage (1987) (Genta's father)
- Bikkuriman (1987) (Urashi Maijin, Hyōzansuke, others)
- Transformers: The Headmasters (1987) (Abominus, Groove, Hardhead, Jazz, Slag, Slingshot, Trypticon, Wideload)
- Fist of the North Star 2 (1987) (Zorba)
- Sakigake!! Otokojuku (1987) (Ippei Tazawa)
- Kiteretsu Daihyakka (1988) (Sasaki-sensei, Sasaki-sensei's Father, Tom, Tongaripapa (Third), Alien, others)
- Transformers: Super God Masterforce (1988) (Turter, King Poseidon, Phoenix, Diner Owner (episode 24))
- Dragon Ball Z (1989) (Oguri. Police officer, others)
- Transformers: Victory (1989) (Kakuryu, Drillhorn, Doctor Minakaze)

1990s

- Oishinbo (1990) (Motoyoshi Mikawa, Employee (A))
- Armored Police Metal Jack (1991) (Offender)
- Goldfish Warning! (1991) (Doctor Ohashi (Second))
- Kinnikuman: Kinnikusei Ōi Sōdatsu-hen (1991) (Announcer Sekiguchi, God of Powerful, Kinnikuman Big Body/Strongman, King The 100 Ton (Episode 4), Bikeman, Chōjin Enma)
- Future GPX Cyber Formula (1991) (Smith)
- Matchless Raijin-Oh (1991) (Uchida Official)
- Dragon Quest: Dai no Daibōken (1991) (Bartos)
- Trapp Family Story (1991) (Hans)
- Ghost Sweeper Mikami (1993) (Schwartz)
- Slam Dunk (1993) (Koike (first))
- Tama and Friends (1994) (Otsubo-sensei)
- Tico of the Seven Seas (1994) (Crew)
- Marmalade Boy (1994) (Gen Kitahara)
- Slayers (1995) (Demia and Zolf)
- Neighborhood Story (1996)
- Famous Dog Lassie (1996) (Heins)
- Hell Teacher Nūbē (1997) (Youkai Piano, Makuragaeshi)
- Mashin Eiyuden Wataru (1997) (Tobiderun)
- Yu-Gi-Oh! (1998) (Karita)
- Shin Hakkenden (1999) (Aori)

2000s

- One Piece (2000) (Ippon-Matsu and Topman Warcury)
- Hiwou War Chronicles (2001) (Murakami)
- Stellvia (2003) (Reshio Sulijet)
- Detective Conan (2003) (Masaru Saruhashi, Terafumi Kasuga)
- Slam Dunk (2003) (Laura's Father)
- Monster (2004) (Kunz)
- GeGeGe no Kitarō (2007) (Abura-sumashi)
- Dennō Coil (2007) (Doctor)
- Tytania (2008) (Salomon)

2010s

- Dragon Ball Kai (2010) (Oldman Tsuno)
- Crayon Shin-chan (2016) (Sakuzō Yoneda)
- Nintama Rantarō (2017) (Hiranosuke Inadera (Second))
- atime: Born Dragon Note (2017) (Muhammad Athhar Arsaputra)

=== OVA ===
- Legend of the Galactic Heroes (1988) (Moore)
- Transformers: Zone (1990) (Star Cloud, King Poseidon, Menasor)
- Dai Yamato Zero-go (2004) (X-2)

=== Theatrical animation ===
- Odin: Photon Sailer Starlight (1985) (Chosuke Ohtsuka)
- Toki no Tabibito -Time Stranger- (1986) (Ishida Mitsunari)
- Royal Space Force: The Wings of Honnêamise (1987) (Kharock)
- Akira (1988) (Takeyama)
- Mobile Suit Gundam F91 (1991) (Pilot)
- Dragon Ball Z: Cooler's Revenge (1991) (Naise)

=== Video games ===
- Ys III: Wanderers from Ys (1991) (Gardner)
- Xenosaga Episode I (2002) (Moriyama)
- Dragon Ball: Revenge of King Piccolo (2009) (Piano)
- Ryū ga Gotoku 5 (2012) (Sakurai)

=== Tokusatsu ===
- Ninpuu Sentai Hurricaneger (2002) (Lingering Summerheat Ninja Bero-Tan (ep. 29))
- Mahou Sentai Magiranger (2005) (Hades Warrior God Toad (eps. 35 - 44))
- Ultraman Max (Auto Maton (ep. 38 - 39))
- Engine Sentai Go-onger (2008) (Savage Water Barbaric Machine Beast Bombe Banki (ep. 7))

=== Drama CDs ===
- Hana Yori mo Hana no Gotoku (????) (Norito's father)

=== Dubbing ===
- The Empire Strikes Back (1980 Movie theater edition) (Commander Nemet)
- Thomas & Friends (1995-1998) (George)
