= Melody (magazine) =

Japanese manga magazine

- Cover of the August 2007 issue, featuring Tomo Matsumoto's one-shot Seifuku
- Editor-in-Chief: Naoko Takeda
- Categories: Shōjo manga/Josei manga
- Frequency: Bi-monthly
- Circulation: 15,000; (July–September 2026)
- First issue: September 1997
- Company: Hakusensha
- Country: Japan
- Based in: Chiyoda-ku, Tokyo
- Language: Japanese
- Website: melody-web.com

Melody (Japanese: メロディ, Hepburn: Merodi), stylized as MELODY, is a Japanese shōjo and josei manga magazine published on the 28th of even-numbered months by Hakusensha since August 28, 1997 (cover date September 1997).

Melody's primary demographic is older women; the publisher reported in 2021 that its readership was 50.8% OLs, 20.4% housewives, and 11.8% university students. Its last reported circulation was 36,500 in 2021, down from 39,200 in 2016.

== Serializations ==
The following is a partial list of titles serialized in Melody:

=== Current ===
- Hana Yori mo Hana no Gotoku by Minako Narita (since 2001)
- Otogimoyou Ayanishiki Futatabi by Kyoko Hikawa (since 2009)
- Himitsu – Season 0 by Reiko Shimizu (since 2012)
- Idol Dreams by Arina Tanemura (since 2013)
- Kageki Shojo!! by Kumiko Saiki (since 2015)
- Boku wa Chikyū to Utau by Saki Hiwatari (since 2018) (Note: Boku wa Chikyū to Utau was first serialized in Hakusensha's Bessatsu Hana to Yume magazine, starting in the May 2015 issue on March 26, 2015. After the magazine ceased publication, the series transferred to Melody, starting in the October 2018 issue on August 28, 2018.)
- Kami o Kiri ni Kimashita by Shin Takahashi (since 2019)
- Rhythm Nation by Tomo Matsumoto (since 2020)
- Suzuki-kun's Mindful Life by Yuki Fujimoto (since 2022)
- The Vampire and His Pleasant Companions by Narise Konohara and Marimo Ragawa (since 2022)

=== Former ===
- Patalliro! by Mineo Maya (1997–2016) (Note: Patalliro! was first serialized in Hakusensha's Hana to Yume magazine from 1978 to 1990. Afterward, it ran in Hakusensha's Hana to Yume Planet Zōkan from 1990 to 1997, in Melody from 1997 to 2016, and in Bessatsu Hana to Yume, too. The series transferred to Hakusensha's Hana LaLa Online web manga site in 2016, and then to Hana LaLa's successor, Manga Park, in 2017.)
- Onmyōji by Reiko Okano and Baku Yumemakura (1999–2005) (Note: Onmyōji was first serialized in Schola's Comic Burger magazine from 1993 to 1996. It then ran in Comic Birz from 1996 to 1999, and in Melody from 1999 to 2005.)
- Bright no Yūutsu by Keiko Takemiya (2000–2004)
- Shūdōshi Falco by Yasuko Aoike (2001) (Note: Shūdōshi Falco was first serialized in Hakusensha's Hanayōbi magazine from 1991 to 1992. After a hiatus, it resumed serialization in Melody in 2001. Shortly thereafter, it was put on hiatus again, and resumed serialization in Akita Shoten's Princess Gold in 2013.)
- Gatcha Gacha by Yutaka Tachibana (2001–2007)
- Himitsu – Top Secret by Reiko Shimizu (2001–2012)
- All My Darling Daughters by Fumi Yoshinaga (2002–2003)
- Hanasakeru Seishōnen Special Edition (2009–2014)
- Ōoku: The Inner Chambers by Fumi Yoshinaga (2004–2020)
- Tom Sawyer by Shin Takahashi (2004–2006)
- Otogimoyou Ayanishiki by Kyoko Hikawa (2006–2008) (Note: Otogimoyou Ayanishiki was first serialized in Hakusensha's LaLa magazine from 2005 to 2006. It then transferred to Melody, where it ran from 2006 to 2008.)
- Soko o Nantoka by Mikoto Asou (2007–2018)
- Please, Jeeves by Bun Katsuta (2008–2014)
- Nīsan to Boku by Keiko Nishi (2008–2011)
- Onmyōji: Tamatebako by Reiko Okano and Baku Yumemakura (2010–2017)
- Nakajima Nakajima by Keiko Nishi (2011–2014)
- Ano Shōtengai no, Honya no, Chiisana Oku-san no O-Hanashi by Shin Takahashi (2013)
- Hatsukoi Honya by Shin Takahashi (2014–2015)
