= Mineo Maya =

Japanese manga artist

Mineo Maya 魔夜峰央
- Born: March 4, 1953 (age 73) Niigata City, Japan
- Area: Manga artist
- Notable works: Patalliro! Fly Me to the Saitama

Mineo Maya (魔夜峰央, Maya Mineo) is a Japanese manga artist born in 1953. His series Patalliro! is one of the best-selling and the longest-running shōjo manga of all time.

== Life ==
Maya was born in Niigata. He made his debut as a professional manga artist in 1973 with Mishiranu hōmon-sha in the shōjo magazine Bessatsu Margaret.

His most successful series started in 1978 with Patalliro!, which was adapted into an anime series. Since then, he has worked on the series for different magazines and produced several spin-offs. With more than 100 volumes, it is the longest-running shōjo manga. An anime adaptation in 1983 was the first TV anime to show homosexuality. In 1981, he was nominated for the Seiun Award and in 1999, he received the Japan Cartoonists Association Award for the series. The spin-off series Patalliro Saiyūki! has been translated into French.

In the early 1980s, he met ballet dancer Yoshimi Yamada and got married. They have two children, one of them is the manga artist Marie Yamada.

His manga Tonde Saitama has been adapted into a live-action film starring musician Gackt in 2019 and with himself appearing in the opening scene.

Maya is a heavy drinker. Because of excessive alcohol consumption, he had health problems with his liver in February 2016 and was forced to undergo medical treatment.

== Works ==
- Mishiranu hōmon-sha (見知らぬ訪問者, 1973, one-shot in Bessatsu Margaret)
- Rashanu! (ラシャーヌ!, serialized in Hana to Yume, Bessatsu Hana to Yume and LaLa, 1978–1989)
- Patalliro! (パタリロ!, serialized in Hana to Yume, Bessatsu Hana to Yume, Melody, Hana LaLa online and Manga Park, since 1978)
- Tonde Saitama (翔んで埼玉, serialized in Hana to Yume, 1982–1983)
- Yōkai shimatsu hito Trauma!! (妖怪始末人トラウマ!!, serialized in Komi Komi, 1986–1988)
- Astaroth (アスタロト, serialized in Bessatsu Princess, 1991–1994)
- Zero Hoshi (ゼロ星, serialized in Princess Gold, 1994–1997)
- Yōkai tōzoku Mazar-i-Sharif (妖怪盗賊マザリシャリフ, serialized in LC Mystery, 1994–1995)
- Patalliro Saiyūki! (パタリロ西遊記!, serialized in Melody, 2000–2004)
- May Tantei Purikoro (May探偵プリコロ, since 2009)
- Nemuranai Eve (眠らないイヴ, serialized in Manga Life, since 2018)
