= Kanata-Kakeru =

Japanese manga series

- First tankōbon volume cover

かなたかける
- Genre: Sports
- Manga
- Written by: Shin Takahashi
- Published by: Shogakukan
- Magazine: Weekly Big Comic Spirits
- Original run: January 4, 2016 – September 3, 2018
- Volumes: 10
- icon

Kanata-Kakeru (かなたかける) is a Japanese manga series written and illustrated by Shin Takahashi. It was serialized in Shogakukan's seinen manga magazine Weekly Big Comic Spirits from January 2016 to September 2018.

== Publication ==
Written and illustrated by Shin Takahashi, Kanata-Kakeru was serialized in Shogakukan's seinen manga magazine Weekly Big Comic Spirits from January 4, 2016, to September 3, 2018. Shogakukan collected its chapters in five tankōbon volumes, released from March 30, 2016, to October 30, 2018.

=== Volumes ===
| No. | Japanese release date | Japanese ISBN |
|---|---|---|
| 1 | March 30, 2016 | 978-4-09-187584-6 |
| 2 | June 30, 2016 | 978-4-09-187635-5 |
| 3 | November 30, 2016 | 978-4-09-189240-9 |
| 4 | December 28, 2016 | 978-4-09-189263-8 |
| 5 | May 30, 2017 | 978-4-09-189557-8 |
| 6 | September 29, 2017 | 978-4-09-189646-9 |
| 7 | December 27, 2017 | 978-4-09-189704-6 |
| 8 | March 30, 2018 | 978-4-09-189815-9 |
| 9 | July 30, 2018 | 978-4-09-860047-2 |
| 10 | October 30, 2018 | 978-4-09-860118-9 |
