= Kaguyahime (manga) =

1994 manga series by Reiko Shimizu

- Kaguya-hime: The Moon Princess
- Cover of volume 1

輝夜姫 (Kaguyahime)
- Manga
- Written by: Reiko Shimizu
- Published by: Hakusensha
- Magazine: LaLa
- Original run: 1993 – 2005
- Volumes: 27

Kaguyahime (輝夜姫) is a manga series by Reiko Shimizu. This 27-volume series was serialized in LaLa from 1993 to 2005. The story is based on the Japanese legend of Kaguya-hime (The Tale of the Bamboo Cutter).

In 2002, the series received the 47th annual Shogakukan Manga Award for shōjo. A Drama CD was released in 2003.

== Story ==
Based on The Tale of the Bamboo Cutter, this manga takes place around the mysterious Kabuchi Island where children were raised in an orphanage as sacrificial victims. Some of the children manage to leave the island and think they have escaped their fates. But then they all start to die at age sixteen, in the order and at the time they were originally arranged to be sacrificed. The only way to stop the deaths is to return to the island, seek out the cause – Kaguya Hime – and destroy it. The children later realize that they are clones of famous or influential humans, a fact which further complicates their quest to figure out their mysterious past and save their futures.

== Terminology ==
Sacrifice
A child orphan raised on Kabuchi Island for the purpose of becoming the victim of the Kaguya-hime "festival".
Donor
A human who was cloned for the purpose of offering organs or spare parts to a VIP of financial or political power (the "recipient"). Clones can be created for insurance purposes (Akira, Midori, Sutton, Satoshi, Katsura, Kaede, Mamoru) and crucial organ parts (Miller) in transplant surgeries. The process involves splitting the fertilized egg while still in the womb and freezing one half to be transported to the second Earth.
Camp U.G. (Underground)
A U.S. Armed Forces military camp whose target recruits were young men. A large cash prize and citizenship under any country were promised to four participants who successfully completed the mission. This incentive was necessary because the military takes no legal responsibility for participants, and every year there are deaths. The camp's location changes every year; in this case, it was held at Kabuchi Island.
Kabuchi Island (Kabuchijima)
An island on the Amami archipelago where Akira and the orphans grew up. Its creatures and plants seem to be endemic. The island's history and cultural practices remain shrouded in mystery.
Moon Stone
A Moon rock brought to Earth through the Apollo mission program. Its appearance differs from other Moon rocks, and was believed to have been "created" over seven billion years ago. Its pieces were distributed to six different countries (Japan, China, America, Britain, Russia, and Thailand), and the existence of these stones is not known to the public. It is the "hagoromo" (Feather mantle that enables Kaguya Hime to fly and return to the Moon) of the Moon.
Moon Stone Mold
Mold that is spread through contact with the Moon stone. When a human is infected and not immediately quarantined the disease can become an airborne pathogen. A cure is being researched but it is currently fatal to all who catch it. The sacrifices are immune to the mold due to the environment in which they were raised and their genetic makeup.
Li Plutocracy
The main branch of the Li clan. They possess so much wealth and influence that they are referred to as an empire. They are known for their harsh rules of succession under which the empress is bound. A female successor must live within the palace walls until they are an adult. At the age of 18, there is a ceremony in which her suitors are revealed. The characteristic style of marriage is the successor chooses one of her five suitors every night as her companion, and when a child is conceived marriage arrangements are made.
Original Body
The VIP of financial or political power that are the "recipient" of all the donors.

== Characters ==
Akira Okada (岡田晶, Okada Akira)
The main protagonist, Akira is a woman of androgynous beauty. She is dignified and strong-willed. While attending high school she was more popular with the girls than boys and was often mistaken for a man (for example: she won a magazine's bishōnen contest that her classmates entered her in as a joke). As time passes, she flourishes into a young lady. When she was a baby, she was found in a bamboo thicket and taken in by the Kashiwagi family, but the couple divorced when she was three and Akira was abandoned to Kabuchi Island. At the age of five she was adopted by Shoko Okada, an artist who received child support to raise her. By junior high school Akira was forced into a homosexual relationship with her stepmother. To escape the situation with her adopted family, she decides to participate in Camp U.G. She is kidnapped from the camp and forced to assume her role as the donor of a Chinese empress, Li Gyokurei (李玉鈴, rigyokurei).
She was in love with Yui. But in the end, Yui died and she became Miller's wife and had a son with him. Years later when she was at death's door Yui came for her and took her back to the Moon, meaning that she was a tennyo from the beginning.
Yui Lindros (由･リンドロス, Yui Rindorosu)
Possesses superhuman abilities, such as superior eyesight and strength. He, Midori, and Akira were particularly good friends during their childhood. Since their escape from Kabuchi island he has been known to suppress his emotions and is weak in communicating with others. He is gentle but lonely, and gets anxious when separated from Midori. He returns to the island through Camp U.G. with them to break the island's curse and protect his two friends from harm. He is revealed to be the son of the legendary Kaguya-hime and a human, which makes him a tennin. In the end he died and was returned to the moon, while making a promise to Akira that he will return to take her back in the future.
Midori Matsuzawa (松沢碧, Matsuzawa Midori)
Donor for the 9th generation foremost Prince of Thailand. The age difference between him and his "true body" is 10 years. He has a calm and kind personality and harbors strong feelings for Akira. He also deeply cares for Yui, but sees him as a romantic rival, often acting out coldly when he feels Yui is being extremely affectionate or overprotective. He is diagnosed with stomach cancer and is given the option of having an operation, but instead leaves for Camp U.G., despite his weak medical condition.
After that his original body met with an incident so the original body's useful body parts were transplanted to Midori instead and Midori became the first prince of Thailand. In the end it was revealed that he is Yui's equivalent to the "hagoromo" of the Moon and when Midori died Yui lost his powers as a tennin as well. Midori then became one with Yui spiritually.
Mayu Okada (岡田まゆ, Okada Mayu)
Daughter of Shoko Okada and Akira's classmate. She is very possessive of Akira, and doesn't let anyone near her. She has a sweet appearance but will do anything to get her way (such as pretending to be sick and fainting on the spot to get attention). Romantically interested in Akira and obsessed with what she calls Akira's "cleanliness", Mayu killed her mother Shouko before going to UG Camp. Later on, was separated from Akira when all of the donors were caught and killed for the transplants. After hard work and time, she finally found Akira as Li Gyokurei, but realized that the Akira she knew had changed. She tried committing suicide a few times to get Akira's attention, and when it did not work she decided to commit suicide together with Akira. As Midori risked his life to save her and became brain dead, she realized her own foolishness and changed for the better.
Sutton (サットン, Satton)
Donor for NBA star player Don Bellamy (ドン・ベラミー, Don Beramī). He also wanted to become a basketball player like his "true body." He has strong leadership skills and becomes the leader of Camp U.G. during their stay (despite Kaede's rejection of the idea). After the transplant his rage at being killed was so strong that his cells took over Don Bellamy's body. However, in the end when the moon was separated from the Earth after the moon stone was returned to the Moon, he disappeared from Don Bellamy's body and Don lost all his memories of the time when he was Sutton.
Brett Miller (ブレット･ミラー, Buretto Mirā)
Donor for Julian, a blood relative of the British royal family. He was used for a kidney transplant at the age of 5. He is a famous Hollywood actor known for his gorgeous looks, but his personality is inconsiderate and rough. He gets upset when he is mistaken for a lady (which happens often) and a director was hospitalized after being assaulted by him in the past. Because of his failing eyesight he had to quit the acting business and cut all ties with his agents before leaving for Camp U.G. Julian, his original body, in order to repay him for the kidney transplant that allowed him to live to 20, set it up so that Miller received his eyes instead and lived as Julian. When Yui died, Miller proposed to Akira and told her that he did not mind if she still loves Yui.Later they had one child, and Akira confessed that along the way she fell in love with Miller. They lived together for many years. Then, when Akira was at death's door, Yui came and took her 'back' to the Moon. It was hinted that when Akira died he became extremely sick and then died.
Kaede (楓, Kaede)
Donor of Kim Seok-Yong (キム・ソギョン, Kimu Sogyon), son of a Korean Nobel Prize recipient. Younger twin of Katsura. Obstinate and childish, and seemingly aware of these personality flaws. Participated in Camp U.G. in hopes of winning the money to repay a failed business debt. When he was killed and his heart was transplanted to Kim Seok-Yong, he took over the body and left home in order to look for Katsura, and found Katsura with the help of Mamoru, though in a brain dead state. In order not to let Katsura suffer anymore, he made a painful decision and shut off Katsura's respiratory system, thus ending his misery. He hated the original body's father, but visited him when he was on death bed. Seemingly his father knew that the one who was living right now is Kaede instead of his son, he apologized and in the end Kaede forgave him. In the end he lost his memory of being Kaede when the Moon left Earth.
Katsura (桂, Katsura)
Donor of Kim Seok-Yong (キム・ソギョン, Kimu Sogyon), son of a Korean Nobel Prize recipient. Twin of Kaede. Steady in character and keeps Kaede out of trouble. When Kaede's heart was taken during the transplant, he tried to commit suicide and thus to prevent him from doing so his brain was taken out via operation and he was kept alive in a brain dead state.
Satoshi Oda (小田聡, Oda Satoshi)
Donor of Hiroki Rushton (ヒロキ・ラシュトン, Hiroki Rashuton), son of an American Congressman of Japanese descent. Was adopted by a loving Japanese family and did well in school, but killed a classmate just before leaving for Camp U.G. He is quick on comebacks and develops intelligent schemes to get what he wants. After transplant he lived as Hiroki, but had a son with Hiroki's lover. He coldly demanded that she abort the child and annulled their wedding to become one of Li Gyokurei's consort candidate.
Mamoru (守)
Donor of Yuri Babanin (ユーリー・ババーニン, Yūrī Babānin), a high-ranking member of the Russian mafia. Mamoru is wanted by the law for cheating and stealing, and wishes to have a fresh start at life through Camp U.G. Because of his nearsightedness, he kept a distance from people and never took the time to properly take notice of them. When he was used to do a transplant, he lived on as Yuri Babanin. He was said to look very different from his donor as compared to the rest of the donors, but it was revealed that it was because he squinted his eyes due to his bad eyesight, which became a habit. But he lost his freckles as well as dyed his hair. In the end he lost his memory of being Mamoru, but seemingly he stopped being a member of the mafia as he decided that with the new Earth there was no need for one anymore.

== Release ==
The series was serialized in LaLa magazine from the October 1993 issue until the February 2005 issue. Parallel to that, it was released in 27 volumes by Hakusensha. In 2007 and 2008, the series was reprinted in Japan in a 14 volume bunkobon edition.

Kaguyahime was partially translated into French and German by Panini Comics. The complete series has been published in Italian in 28 volumes by the same publisher.

== Drama CD ==
The Drama CD was released on July 25, 2003. It was sold along with another CD containing illustrations in slide show format from the series.

=== Cast ===
- Akira Okada: Yumi Kakazu
- Yui: Akira Ishida
- bodyguard: Jurota Kosugi
- Mamoru: Jin Yamanoi
- Midori Matsuzawa: Yuki Matsuda
- Satoshi Oda: Hirofumi Nojima
- Kaede: Hiroyuki Yoshino
- Sutton: Yuji Kishi
- Brett Miller: Yasuyuki Kase
- Mayu Okada: Maria Yamamoto
