= Reiko Shimizu =

Japanese manga artist

Reiko Shimizu 清水玲子
- Born: March 26, 1963 (age 63) Kumamoto, Kumamoto, Japan
- Area: Manga artist
- Notable works: Kaguyahime, Himitsu - Top Secret

Reiko Shimizu (清水玲子, Shimizu Reiko; born March 26, 1963 in Tokyo, Japan) is a Japanese shōjo manga writer and illustrator. She is noted for her works of science fiction and her art style, and is also known for her illustrations of tarot cards called the Miracle Tarot deck.

== Career ==
She made her professional debut in 1983 with Sansaro Monogatari in LaLa, and has written primarily for the publisher Hakusensha since.

She received the 2002 Shogakukan Manga Award for shōjo for Kaguyahime. Her Himitsu - Top Secret has been recommended twice by the Japan Media Arts Festival jury in 2007 and 2008. It has also been listed on the Tohan charts four times as of May 2009.

Her manga Moon Child is licensed in English by CMX Manga.

== Works ==
- Sansaro Monogatari (三叉路物語, one-shot in LaLa, 1983)
- Ryū no Nemeru Hoshi (竜の眠る星, serialized in LaLa, 1986–1988)
- Milky Way (ミルキーウェイ, serialized in LaLa, 1986–1987)
- Yume no Tsuzuki (夢のつづき, one-shot in LaLa, 1988)
- Moon Child (月の子 Tsuki no Ko, 1988–1992)
- 22xx (1992)
- Papillon (パピヨン, 1993)
- Kaguyahime (輝夜姫, serialized in LaLa, 1993–2005)
- Magic (serialized in LaLa, 1996)
- Wild Cats (serialized in LaLa, 1997–2000)
- Himitsu - Top Secret (秘密 -トップ・シークレット-, serialized in Melody, 1999–2012)
- Deep Water (serialized in Melody, 2013–2014)
- Himitsu - Top Secret - season0 (秘密 -トップ・シークレット-season0, serialized in Melody, since 2013)
