= Hana to Oku-tan =

Japanese manga series

- First tankōbon volume cover

花と奥たん
- Genre: Science fiction; Slice of life
- Manga
- Written by: Shin Takahashi
- Published by: Shogakukan
- Magazine: Weekly Big Comic Spirits
- Original run: December 10, 2007 – June 17, 2019
- Volumes: 5
- icon

Hana to Oku-tan: Uruwashigaoka Life! (花と奥たん Uruwashigaoka Life!) is a Japanese manga series written and illustrated by Shin Takahashi. It was irregularly serialized in Shogakukan's seinen manga magazine Weekly Big Comic Spirits from December 2007 to June 2019.

== Publication ==
Written and illustrated by Shin Takahashi, Hana to Oku-tan debuted in Shogakukan's seinen manga magazine Weekly Big Comic Spirits on December 10, 2007. A "chapter zero" was published in the inaugural issue of Monthly Big Comic Spirits on August 27, 2009. The manga was irregularly serialized in Weekly Big Comic Spirits, and finished on June 17, 2019. Shogakukan collected its chapters in five tankōbon volumes, released from April 30, 2009, to September 30, 2019.

=== Volumes ===
No.	Japanese release date	Japanese ISBN
1	April 30, 2009	978-4-09-182533-9
2	March 29, 2013	978-4-09-184843-7
3	July 30, 2019	978-4-09-860429-6
4	August 30, 2019	978-4-09-860440-1
5	September 30, 2019	978-4-09-860478-4

== Reception ==
Hana to Oku-tan was one of the Jury Recommended Works at the 18th Japan Media Arts Festival in 2014.
