= Fly Me to the Saitama =

- Theatrical release poster

Japanese name
- Kanji: 翔んで埼玉
- Literal meaning: Fly to Saitama
Transcriptions
- Revised Hepburn: Tonde Saitama
- Directed by: Hideki Takeuchi
- Written by: Yuichi Tokunaga
- Based on: Tonde Saitama by Mineo Maya
- Produced by: Hiroki Wakamatsu; Shinya Furugori
- Starring: Fumi Nikaido; Gackt; Yusuke Iseya; Masaki Kyomoto
- Cinematography: Sohei Tanikawa
- Edited by: Shinji Kawamura
- Music by: Face 2 Fake
- Distributed by: Toei
- Release date: February 22, 2019 (Japan)
- Running time: 107 minutes
- Country: Japan
- Language: Japanese
- Box office: ¥3.76 billion (Japan)

Fly Me to the Saitama (Japanese: 翔んで埼玉, Hepburn: Tonde Saitama; stylized as Fly me to the Saitama) is a 2019 Japanese comedy film directed by Hideki Takeuchi, based on the 1980s manga series of the same name written and illustrated by Mineo Maya.

It was released to critical acclaim and received 12 nominations at the 43rd Japan Academy Film Prize, taking home the Director of the Year, Screenplay of the Year, and Best Film Editing. It also won the Best Film at Blue Ribbon Awards. With a gross of $32.8 million it was the 13th highest-grossing film of 2019 in Japan.

== Plot ==
In present-day Saitama, Aimi Sugawara's parents are driving her to her engagement ceremony. Aimi's parents are upset that Aimi plans to move to Tokyo after the marriage because residents of Tokyo have long looked down on residents of Saitama. To avoid arguing, they pass the time by listening to the Saitama's local radio channel FM NACK5 , which is playing a supposedly historical drama about Saitama's fight for liberation from Tokyo's oppression and discrimination.

The radio drama unfolds as Momomi Dannoura, the son of the Tokyo governor, finds his social status at Hakuhodo high school threatened by the arrival of Rei Asami, a handsome male student who has been living in America. Unusually for a sophisticated Tokyo elite, Rei helps the "Z Class" students from Saitama in Hakuhodo high school, who live in poor conditions in a hut located off the main campus grounds.

Momomi falls in love with Rei, but Rei is revealed to be a secret agent of "Saitama liberation front" sent to help achieve liberation from Tokyo by infiltrating the Tokyo elite. Rei's true identity is discovered by Momomi's family butler Akutsu, and Rei flees to return to Saitama and join the liberation movement. Momomi joins him after discovering a plot by Tokyo elites to destroy the Saitama resistance.

In fact, Akutsu was a member of the Chiba Liberation Front, and while pandering to Tokyo, he was also hostile to Saitama Liberation Front. The Saitama Liberation Front and the Chiba Liberation Front face each other across the Edogawa River near Nagareyama Bridge, at the provincial border of Saitama and Chiba. However, Momomi had come to a settlement beforehand when he discovered a lot of gold bars on Mount Akagi in Gunma that had been illegally accumulated by past governors of Tokyo. The two fronts then joined forces and attacked Tokyo for liberation. Rei and Momomi reveal Momomi's father's plot, removing him from power and achieving liberation for Saitama.

Finally, Momomi and Rei begin Duke Saitama's "Japan Saitamaization Plan," a plan to secretly spread Saitama's "unremarkable culture" throughout Japan.

== Cast ==
=== Legend part ===
- Fumi Nikaido as Momomi Dannoura
- Gackt as Rei Asami
- Masaki Kyomoto as Duke Saitama, Rei's father and the leader of "Saitama liberation front"
- Akaji Maro as Sojuro Saionji, Rei's uncle
- Tsubasa Masuwaka (Hometown:Saitama Prefecture) as Okayo, Rei's maid-servant
- Akira Nakao as Kenzo Dannoura, Momomi's father and the governor of Tokyo
- Kumiko Takeda as Momomi's mother
- Yusuke Iseya as Sho Akutsu, butler of Dannoura family and the leader of "Chiba liberation front"
- Naoto Takenaka (Hometown:Kanagawa Prefecture) as the governor of Kanagawa Prefecture
- Ryō Katō as a student of "Z class" in the Hakuhodo high school
- Patrick Harlan as a narrator at the beginning

=== Present part ===
- Haruka Shimazaki (Hometown:Saitama Prefecture) as Aimi Sugawara
- Brother Tom (Hometown:Saitama Prefecture) as Aimi's father
- Kumiko Aso (Hometown:Chiba Prefecture) as Aimi's mother
- Ryo Narita (Hometown:Saitama Prefecture) as Aimi's fiancé

== Production ==
Hiroki Wakamatsu (Fuji Television), the producer of this film, first worked with the director Hideki Takeuchi, his colleague of Fuji TV at the time, and also with screenwriter Yuichi Tokunaga during the production of Train Man (TV series) (2005). Wakamatsu and Takeuchi had worked together on popular Japanese TV dramas such as Nodame Cantabile (2006), but their opportunities to work together had decreased gradually. Then, when Wakamatsu was transferred to film production department of Fuji TV, a collaboration opportunity came up. Wakamatsu initially proposed a different comic as the original work for the film. But Takeuchi brought the Mineo Maya's cult manga "Fly me to the Saitama "(1982–1983), which was piled up in a bookstore. (Note: The cult manga "Fly Me to the Saitama" was written by Mineo Maya in 1982–1983. He is a native of Niigata City, one of the largest cities on the Japan Sea coast. Then, due to a conspiracy by his editors, Maya was forced to live in Tokorozawa City, Saitama Prefecture, still a rural area in the South Kanto region in early 1980s. Maya was very frustrated by living near his editors in rural Saitama. The frustration lead him to write this manga. Four years after, Maya could not endure the rural life in Saitama and moved to Yokohama City, Kanagawa Prefecture, then he lost the motivation to write this work. So the manga "Fly Me to the Saitama" was left unfinished by only three chapters.)

In February 2015, Maya's eldest daughter Marie Yamada, who is in charge of public relations of Maya, mentioned on social media about the "Fly Me to the Saitama" which was already out of print. This work led to it being reprinted by Takarajimasha in the December 2015, and it became a social phenomenon and a sudden boom, especially in Saitama Prefecture. This is the reason why the Maya's manga was piled up in bookstores when Diretor Takeuchi tried to make a movie out of it. Since the original story was unfinished, a new ending was needed to make it into a movie.

Though, from the perspective of compliance, there were strong voices of opposition to the production of this film within Fuji TV about discrimination for a specific area, Saitama Prefecture. So, the planning of this film ran into difficulties. In the end, the production was green-lit after the boss of Takeuchi and Wakamatsu decided that the combination of two would make an interesting film.

Because of this film's crazy content, both Wakamatsu and Takeuchi were extremely worried that riots might break out among the people of Saitama Prefecture until the film was released. (Note: In Saitama Prefecture, Ageo riot, Japan's largest civil riot after the World War II, actually occurred in 1973.) Thus, they created a list of anticipated questions and answers for dealing with complaints from Saitama Prefecture's people, and distributed the list to the relevant departments at Fuji TV and Toei Company. However, after the film was released, it turned out that these concerns were completely unfounded. There were hardly any complaints, and instead, the film received a lot of praise from various people in Saitama Prefecture, with saying things like, "They did a great job!"

== Reception ==
=== Box office ===
In the opening weekend it topped the Japanese box office with $2.33 million. The film had grossed $32.8 million in Japan by May 2019. By the end of 2019, the film had grossed ¥3.76 billion, making it the eighth highest-grossing domestic film of 2019 in Japan and the 13th highest-grossing film of 2019 overall in Japan.

On 11 September 2019 it was released on DVD and Blu-ray, charting for 43 cumulative weeks and peaking at 2nd place on Oricon's chart.

=== Critical reception ===
It was released to critical acclaim as received most (12) nominations at the 43rd Japan Academy Film Prize, and won for Director of the Year, Screenplay of the Year, and Best Film Editing, as well won for the Best Film at Blue Ribbon Awards.

In a 4/5 review in The Japan Times, Mark Schilling praised the film for taking a Japan-specific story and making it appealing to international viewers, and singled out lead actress Nikaido's ability to move between serious and humorous moments in her performance of Momori Dannoura.

== Sequel ==
A sequel was announced on August 10, 2021. It features the main staff and cast returning to reprise their roles. The film, titled Tonde Saitama ~Biwako Yori Ai o Komete~ (or Fly Me to the Saitama II), premiered in Japanese theatres on November 23, 2023. In the opening weekend it also topped the Japanese box office with $2.77 million, having a better commercial start than the previous film. However, in the end in it grossed less, a total of $15 million, and in a 3/5 review Schilling concluded that "...the goodies they make look dangerously tempting, but their film, unfortunately, is not ready for export". The film had its North American premiere at the 28th Fantasia International Film Festival on July 23, 2024.
