= Saikano =

Japanese manga series and its adaptations

- First tankōbon volume cover, featuring Chise

最終兵器彼女 (Saishū Heiki Kanojo)
- Genre: Romance; Science fiction; War drama
- Manga
- Written by: Shin Takahashi
- Published by: Shogakukan
- English publisher: NA: Viz Media
- Imprint: Big Spirits Comics
- Magazine: Weekly Big Comic Spirits
- Original run: December 27, 1999 – October 29, 2001
- Volumes: 7
- Anime television series
- Directed by: Mitsuko Kase
- Produced by: Masashi Tsukino; Naoko Takahashi; Naotsugu Kato; Rika Tsuruzaki
- Written by: Itaru Era
- Music by: Takeo Miratsu
- Studio: Gonzo
- Licensed by: AUS: Madman Entertainment; NA: Viz Media (expired); Sentai Filmworks (current); UK: Manga Entertainment
- Original network: Family Gekijo
- English network: US: Anime Network
- Original run: July 2, 2002 – September 24, 2002
- Episodes: 13
- Original video animation

Saikano: Another Love Song
- Directed by: Mitsuko Kase
- Produced by: Naoko Takahashi; Masashi Tsukino; Hiroyuki Yamane; Hiroyuki Katsuno; Masako Yamada
- Written by: Itaru Era
- Music by: Kei Yoshikawa
- Studio: Studio Fantasia
- Licensed by: NA: Viz Media (expired); UK: Manga Entertainment
- Released: August 5, 2005 – September 21, 2005
- Runtime: 30 minutes each
- Episodes: 2
- Live-action film
- Directed by: Taikan Suga
- Written by: Yukako Shimizu
- Music by: Makoto Anzai
- Studio: Toei Company
- Released: January 28, 2006
- Runtime: 120 minutes
- icon

Saikano: The Last Love Song on This Little Planet. (最終兵器彼女, Saishū Heiki Kanojo), also known as She, the Ultimate Weapon, is a Japanese manga series written and illustrated by Shin Takahashi. It was serialized in Shogakukan's seinen manga magazine Weekly Big Comic Spirits from December 1999 to October 2001, with its chapters collected in seven tankōbon volumes.

A 13-episode anime television series adaptation by Gonzo aired from July to September 2002. A two-episode side-story original video animation (OVA) by Studio Fantasia was released in 2005. A live-action film adaptation premiered in January 2006.

Both the manga and the anime series were licensed for English release in North America by Viz Media. The anime was later licensed in 2014 by Sentai Filmworks and released under the title She, the Ultimate Weapon.

== Plot ==
Shuji, a high school student in a Hokkaidō coastal town, discovers his girlfriend Chise's exchange diaries at an observatory, prompting him to reflect on their relationship through flashbacks. Their romance begins awkwardly when the shy Chise confesses her feelings, though neither possesses the emotional maturity to navigate the relationship effectively.

During a routine trip to Sapporo, enemy bombers attack the city. Amid the chaos, Shuji witnesses a small flying object intercepting the bombers before discovering Chise with mechanized wings and weaponry fused to her body. She reveals her involuntary transformation into an ultimate weapon by the Japan Self-Defense Forces, designed as Japan's last line of defense.

The central conflict revolves around Chise's deteriorating humanity as the weapon system overtakes her physiology. She struggles to reconcile her mechanical enhancements with her human identity, a crisis compounded by her deepening bond with Shuji. This relationship ultimately becomes key to her self-acceptance. Secondary narratives explore civilian experiences during wartime, including military spouses, enlistees motivated by loved ones, and bombing victims.

== Characters ==
Chise (ちせ)
Voiced by: Fumiko Orikasa (Japanese); Melissa Hutchison (English)
Portrayed by: Aki Maeda
Chise is a shy, academically struggling student who excels only in World History. Frequently hospitalized during childhood, she has few friends beyond Akemi. With Akemi's assistance, she begins dating the distant Shuji, relying on shōjo manga for romantic guidance. Unwillingly transformed into a weapon, she grapples with her fading humanity as her body loses warmth, heartbeat, and sensory perception—except for heightened vision. Her condition deteriorates until she becomes a merciless force, though her love for Shuji remains her last human connection. He helps her reclaim her humanity by proving only humans can love and protect others, enabling her to destroy her weaponized form. This act challenges the definition of an "ultimate weapon," revealing her soul—not her body—as the true power.
Shuji (シュウジ, Shūji)
Voiced by: Shirou Ishimoda (Japanese); Mark Atherlay (English)
Portrayed by: Shunsuke Kubozuka
Shuji is a 17-year-old high school student with above-average grades and a background in track. Initially hesitant about his relationship with Chise, he views it as complicated but gradually develops deeper feelings. After briefly reverting to friendship, he recognizes his love for her—a realization complicated by the return of his first love, Fuyumi. As the sole civilian aware of Chise's identity as the ultimate weapon, he guards her secret while struggling with guilt over his perceived failures. Eventually, he fully commits to protecting her, dedicating himself to standing by her side.
Akemi (アケミ)
Voiced by: Yū Sugimoto (Japanese); Amy Provenzano (English)
Portrayed by: Shihori Kanjiya
Akemi, a childhood friend and classmate of Chise and Shuji, serves as Chise's closest confidante, often advising her on romantic matters. Though outwardly embodying a tomboy persona, she privately struggles with self-doubt regarding her appearance. She consistently defends Chise when Shuji's careless remarks cause emotional distress, demonstrating steadfast loyalty.
Atsushi (アツシ)
Voiced by: Tetsu Shiratori (Japanese); Joe Wyka (English)
Portrayed by: Ryo Kimura
Atsushi, Shuji's best friend, is a grounded and open-minded individual with a strong interest in military affairs. He ultimately enlists in the Japan Self-Defense Forces to safeguard the person he loves.
Tetsu (テツ)
Voiced by: Shinichiro Miki (Japanese); Abie Hadjitarkhani (English)
Portrayed by: Kiyohiko Shibukawa
The regiment leader and Fuyumi's husband is the sole survivor of Chise's original platoon. His physical and personality resemblance to Shuji initially attracts Chise, who appreciates being treated as an ordinary person rather than a weapon. His military background and relationship with subordinates, including Mizuki, his former commander, further define his character.
Fuyumi (ふゆみ)
Voiced by: Miki Ito (Japanese); Elaine Clark (English)
Portrayed by: Miki Sakai
Fuyumi, Tetsu's wife, previously coached a track team where students addressed her as "Fuyumi-senpai" due to their minimal age difference. She frequently experiences loneliness while her husband remains stationed with military forces. The story later reveals her past romantic involvement with Shuji, who admits his feelings stemmed from physical attraction rather than genuine love.
Mizuki (ミズキ)
Voiced by: Ai Orikasa (Japanese); Brooke Campanelli (English)
Mizuki served as the prototype for the weapon system later implemented in Chise. A former officer severely injured in combat, she returned to duty through the experimental augmentation program. Having worked under Tetsu as his superior, she developed unrequited feelings for him. As one of the few who understood Chise's condition firsthand, having undergone similar modifications herself, Mizuki demonstrated consistent sympathy toward her.
Take
Voiced by: Kishō Taniyama (Japanese); Abie Hadjitarkhani (English)
Take stands out as the most outgoing member of Shuji's friend group and maintains a relationship with Yukari, becoming the first among his peers to have a girlfriend.
Nori
Voiced by: Hiroki Shimowada (Japanese); M.J. Reynolds (English)
Nori, the least mature of Shuji's friends, maintains a naive outlook, insisting their hometown remains safe from war despite growing threats. He harbors strong romantic aspirations and envies Take's relationship status.
Yukari
Voiced by: Sachiko Kojima (Japanese); Nicole Emi (English)
Yukari, Take's girlfriend, withdraws from school following his death. While she later enters a new relationship, she outwardly maintains she will never again experience deep romantic attachment.
Takamura
Voiced by: Kishō Taniyama (Japanese); M.J. Reynolds (English)
A young soldier from Chise's former company deeply admires her, crediting her combat prowess with saving his life during their service together.
Kawahara
Voiced by: Atsushi Ii (Japanese); David Arendash (English)
The lead scientist overseeing Chise's case is an anxious individual, constantly dabbing his forehead with a dark-blue handkerchief during tense moments.

== Media ==
=== Manga ===
Written and illustrated by Shin Takahashi, Saikano was serialized in Shogakukan's seinen manga magazine Weekly Big Comic Spirits from December 27, 1999, to October 29, 2001. Shogakukan collected its chapters in seven tankōbon volumes, released from May 30, 2000, to December 25, 2001. A one-shot chapter was published on January 30, 2006; it was later collected in a gaiden volume, along other one-shot chapters, released on July 19, 2006. Shogakukan re-released the series in four aizoban volumes from September 30 to December 26, 2019.

In North America, the manga was licensed for English release by Viz Media in 2003. The seven volumes were released from June 16, 2004, to January 10, 2006.

==== Volumes ====
No.	Original release date	Original ISBN	English release date	English ISBN
1	May 30, 2000	978-4-09-185681-4	June 16, 2004	978-1-59116-339-8
2	July 29, 2000	978-4-09-185682-1	October 12, 2004	978-1-59116-474-6
3	November 30, 2000	978-4-09-185683-8	January 4, 2005	978-1-59116-475-3
4	March 30, 2001	978-4-09-185684-5	April 12, 2005	978-1-59116-476-0
5	June 30, 2001	978-4-09-185685-2	July 19, 2005	978-1-59116-477-7
6	November 30, 2001	978-4-09-185686-9	October 11, 2005	978-1-59116-478-4
7	December 25, 2001	978-4-09-185687-6	January 10, 2006	978-1-4215-0197-0

=== Anime ===
A 13-episode anime television series adaptation by Gonzo was broadcast on the cable television station Family Gekijo from July 2 to September 24, 2002. Yuria Yato performed both the opening and ending themes, "Koisuru Kimochi" (恋スル気持チ) and "Sayonara" (サヨナラ), respectively. A Blu-ray box, which included the 13 episodes and the two OVA episodes, was released on September 12, 2018.

In North America, the series was licensed by Viz Media. The series was collected in four DVD sets, released from April 27 to November 9, 2004. A DVD box set was released on November 15, 2005. Sentai Filmworks relicensed the series in 2014, under the title She, the Ultimate Weapon. It was released on a single DVD set on April 7, 2015, and on Blu-ray on October 26, 2021.

In the United Kingdom, the series was licensed by Manga Entertainment, under the title She, the Ultimate Weapon, and released on three DVD sets from May 15 to August 21, 2006. In Australia and New Zealand, the series was licensed by Madman Entertainment and released in four DVD sets from July 21, 2004, to January 12, 2005; a complete DVD set was released on December 7, 2005.

==== Episodes ====
No.	Title	Original release date
1	"We're Going to Fall in Love"; Transliteration: "Boku tachi wa, koi shite iku" (Japanese: ぼくたちは, 恋していく)	July 2, 2002
Shuji and Chise have recently begun dating, but Shuji is a bit doubtful about his decision. However, they manage to patch things up and give their newfound love another chance. When Shuji goes to the Sapporo mall with his friends, a group of unnamed bombers attack the city. Injured, Shuji tries to get up only to discover Chise's darkest secret.
2	"I'm Growing..."; Transliteration: "Watashi, seichô shiteru..." (Japanese: 私, 成長してる...)	July 9, 2002
Shuji tries to act as though nothing happened after finding out Chise is the Ultimate Weapon. When Chise tearfully confesses that she is only getting stronger, they try to escape to freedom using Shuji's bike.
3	"Together, Alone"; Transliteration: "Futari de..." (Japanese: ふたりで··)	July 16, 2002
Shuji promises Chise that he will be waiting for her at the train platform so they can both leave the town forever, but she is stopped by a military entourage. While contemplating about his relationship with Chise, Shuji sees a woman riding her bicycle that looks like his former teacher and lover, Fuyumi.
4	"Fuyumi"; Transliteration: "Fuyumi-senpai" (Japanese: ふゆみ先輩)	July 23, 2002
Shuji and Chise go on their first date to an aquarium. Shuji later goes to Fuyumi's house to retrieve his lost wallet, but has to face Fuyumi's seductive advances. In her military base, Chise meets Lt. Tetsu, a man who greatly resembles her boyfriend, Shuji. After a hard mission, Chise wakes up surrounded by a desolate wasteland and asks Tetsu to do one very difficult thing.
5	"Liar"; Transliteration: "Usotsuki…" (Japanese: うそつき…)	July 30, 2002
Tetsu follows Chise command, unflinchingly pointing his rifle directly at Chise's head, but stops after she voices her desire to live. In school, Chise senses an earthquake and Shuji desperately takes her outside the classroom so she can transform in secret. When the military helicopter picks her up, Shuji shouts to Chise to meet him tonight at the observatory.
6	"Classmates"; Transliteration: "Kurasumeito" (Japanese: クラスメイト)	August 6, 2002
Chise decides that they'd be better off as regular classmates, when she finds out that Shuji was once again in Fuyumi's house, breaking his promise to her. Atsushi reveals that he wants to join the military to protect the girl he loves, Akemi.
7	"What I Want to Protect"; Transliteration: "Mamoritai Mono" (Japanese: 守りたいもの)	August 13, 2002
The war has finally reached their peaceful little town. Chise leaves Shuji a note in his locker, and she never comes back to school again. Atsushi wants to find out what exactly this new "Chise" weapon is, but no one wants to give him a straight answer.
8	"Everyone Changes"; Transliteration: "Minna kawatte iku" (Japanese: みんな変わっていく)	August 20, 2002
Yukari joins the neighborhood patrol to find the missing enemy pilot in the mountains. Tetsu treats Chise like a regular person and they go shopping together but end up cuddling and kissing each other. That same night, an earthquake hits their town.
9	"Akemi"; Transliteration: "Akemi" (Japanese: アケミ)	August 27, 2002
Chise did not have maintenance for at least two days, and her physical condition has grown worse. Satomi begs Shuji to come to Akemi's room because she has been fatally injured.
10	"And Then…"; Transliteration: "…Soshite" (Japanese: …そして)	September 3, 2002
Chise holds Tetsu as he slowly dies. Akemi's father gives away party materials, and the school starts to prepare for a Summer festival, but the military wants to cancel it. Chise comes back with Shuji, and the pair happily run off together.
11	"Our Time Together"; Transliteration: "Futari dake no toki" (Japanese: 2人だけの刻)	September 10, 2002
Shuji and Chise elope and start a new life together outside their old town. They both find jobs, and a place to live, so things seem to be finally back in order. However, Kawahara manages to find them and wants to bring Chise back to the base, but Shuji firmly promises him that when the time comes, he will kill Chise with his own hands.
12	"Love Song"; Transliteration: "Rabu songu" (Japanese: ラブ·ソング)	September 17, 2002
Chise has lost her ability to speak and her mental and physical condition has deteriorated gravely. Shuji desperately calls for Kawahara to take her back and save her, but he warns Shuji that Chise will never be the same again. Shuji discovers Chise's exchange diary, and in it there's one simple request for him: To go back to the place where they first kissed.
13	"And So, the Two of Us Fell in Love"; Transliteration: "Soshite, boku tachi wa koi shite iku" (Japanese: そして, 僕たちは恋していく)	September 24, 2002
Chise reveals to Shuji that the world is on the brink of destruction, but wants him by her side until the very end. Chise also says that she will try to protect everyone from the enemy, even if she knows it is useless. Shuji promises that he will as a devastating tsunami approaches.

=== Original video animation ===
A two-episode original video animation (OVA) side-story by Studio Fantasia, titled Saikano: Another Love Song, was released on August 5 and September 21, 2005. Viz Media released the OVA on May 9, 2006. In the United Kingdom, the OVA was released by Manga Entertainment on January 29, 2007.

=== Video game ===
A video game based on the series, developed by Konami Computer Entertainment Tokyo (KCET) and published by Konami for the PlayStation 2, was released on May 29, 2003.

=== Live-action film ===
A live-action film adaptation, directed by Taikan Suga, starring Aki Maeda as Chise and Shunsuke Kubozuka as Shuji, premiered at the Tokyo International Film Festival on October 29, 2005, followed by a theatrical release on January 28, 2006.
