= Patalliro! =

Japanese manga series

- Cover of tankōbon volume 77, featuring Patalliro the 8th in his iconic pose.

パタリロ! (Patariro!)
- Genre: Comedy, fantasy
- Manga
- Written by: Mineo Maya
- Published by: Hakusensha
- Magazine: Hana to Yume; (1978–1989); Hana to Yume Planet Zōkan; (1989–1997); Bessatsu Hana to Yume; (1997–2006); Melody; (2006–2015); Hana LaLa Online; (2015–2017); Manga Park; (2017–present)
- Original run: 1978 – present
- Volumes: 104
- Anime television series

Boku Patalliro!
- Directed by: Nobutaka Nishizawa
- Written by: Masaki Tsuji
- Studio: Toei Animation
- Original network: FNS (Fuji TV)
- Original run: April 8, 1982 – May 13, 1983
- Episodes: 49
- Anime film

Patalliro! Stardust Keikaku
- Directed by: Nobutaka Nishizawa
- Studio: Toei Animation
- Released: July 10, 1983
- Runtime: 48 minutes
- Manga

Patalliro Saiyuki!
- Written by: Mineo Maya
- Published by: Hakusensha
- Magazine: Hana to Yume
- Original run: 2003 – 2005
- Volumes: 8
- Manga

Patalliro Genji Monogatari!
- Written by: Mineo Maya
- Published by: Hakusensha
- Magazine: The Hana to Yume
- Original run: 2004 – 2008
- Volumes: 4
- Anime television series

Patalliro Saiyuki!
- Directed by: Kenichi Maejima
- Studio: Magic Bus
- Original network: Kids Station
- Original run: June 5, 2005 – November 9, 2005
- Episodes: 27

Patalliro! (Japanese: パタリロ!, Hepburn: Patariro!) is a Japanese manga series written and illustrated by Mineo Maya. The comedy manga was serialized in Hana to Yume from 1978 to 1990, before switching to Bessatsu Hana to Yume in 1991, and now currently is serialized on the app Manga Park (マンガPark) since 2020.

An anime adaptation, Boku Patalliro! (ぼくパタリロ!), produced by Toei Animation, originally aired from April 8, 1982, to May 13, 1983, on Fuji TV, and was the first to present shōnen-ai themes on television.

The series has also received four stage plays based on various arcs from anime and manga, and a live action film adaptation in 2018.

Two spin-off manga, Patalliro Saiyūki! and Patalliro Genji Monogatari!, were originally serialized from 2003 to 2005 and 2004–2008 respectively. Patalliro Saiyūki! received an anime adaptation produced by Magic Bus which aired on Kids Station from June 5 to November 9, 2005.

As of 2019, the manga had over 25 million copies in circulation, making it one of the best-selling manga series.

== Plot ==
The story focuses on the comedic adventures of Patalliro himself, and the entire kingdom of Malynera.

== Characters ==
Patalliro du Malyner VIII (パタリロ・ド・マリネール8世)
The 10-year-old diabetic prodigy king of Malynera. He is known for his mischievous behaviour and prankster self. Despite his energetic personality, he is incredibly intelligent.

Jack Barbarossa Bancoran
Major Bancoran of the British MI6. Nicknamed "Bishōnen Killer" for his ability to seduce young men with just his eyes. Patalliro questioned Bancoran to discern if he was interested in his mother, but Bancoran stated that he was only attracted to men. Meeting Patalliro has changed his existence; after playing bodyguard to the most annoying person he's ever met, he's now living with Maraich, who tried to kill him, and their son Figaro. Bancoran is known for his blue eyeshadow (purple in Patalliro Saiyuki), his long black hair, and the fact that he never takes off his gloves, even in bed. His name comes from Henri Bencolin.
In the manga, it is implied that Maraich and Bancoran got married before having their son, who they didn't plan on having essentially.
He also has a cheating habit, especially in the manga. Compared to the anime, in the manga the couple are rather toxic, their complex dynamic taking a toll not only on Maraich but on Figaro as well.
He used to be a very cheerful person but he changed and became the cold version of himself that we know today because his uncle, Keen, murdered his best friend, a talking dog, after the dog found out that Keen is the one who has previously murdered Bancoran's father. For this reason, he dislikes his middle name because he used to be called "Funny Barbarossa" and being called "Barbarossa" brings back sour memories.

Maraich
An 18-year-old former assassin from the Diamond Syndicate. His former lover and abuser, Count Larken, told him not to return until he could kill Bancoran, but ended up reforming and becoming Bancoran's lover. He has a ferocious temper and seethes with jealousy whenever a bishōnen is in Bancoran's vicinity. He beats up Bancoran on a regular basis, regardless of whether or not he cheats, and somehow got pregnant twice, despite being biologically male. He is an expert knife user, and his looks and body allow him to easily pass for a woman with only Patalliro and Bancoran being able to see through his disguise.

In the manga, he is first pregnant in volume 10, and a second time in volume 46. His first pregnancy miscarries, but the second time he gives birth to a son named Figaro Bancoran. His pregnancy is cut out of the anime.

He has no official full name as the last name "Juschenfe" has never been used for him specifically, only various family members of his. He has only ever been referred to as "Maraich" in the series.

Tamanegi
Patalliro's biseinen bodyguards, forced to hide their beauty under padded uniforms, frosted glasses, masks that cover their mouths, noses, and onion-style wigs.

Plasma X
A robot that Patalliro built to mine diamonds on the moon, and another powerful character; one of his abilities is to shoot lasers from his eyes.

Afro-18
A female robot built by Patalliro. She initially dislikes Plasma X, but they later become husband and wife.
Afro and Plasma X have two kids together- a daughter, Purara and a son.

There are many other characters that appear multiple times but don't affect the lore that much like Zachary, a touch sensitive fortune teller, Bjorn, one of Bancoran's ex-lover's who tried to bomb one of Patalliro's diamond mines, Jada, the first bishonen that we meet, etc.

== Anime ==
=== Cast ===
Boku Patalliro!

- Patalliro: Fuyumi Shiraishi
- Bancoran: Kazuyuki Sogabe
- Maraich: Toshiko Fujita
- Police Chief: Ichirō Nagai
- Head Guard: Takeshi Aono
- Tamanegi: Akio Nojima, Toshio Furukawa, Tōru Furuya, Yūji Mitsuya, Yoku Shioya, Kaneto Shiozawa, Kazuhiko Inoue, Akira Kamiya
  - The Tamanegi were portrayed by the members of Slapstick, a voice actor band Sogabe was a member of.
- Etrange: Masako Ikeda
- Sanders: Junpei Takiguchi
- Patalliro 7th: Kazuko Sugiyama
- Patalliro 10th: Minori Matsushima
- Plasma X: Hideyuki Hori
- Afro 18: Eiko Masuyama
- Purara: Michiko Nomura
- α Random: Junko Hori

Patalliro! Saiyuki

- Patalliro/Son Goku: Yuki Kaida
- Maraich/Genjo Sanzo: Reiko Takagi
- Bancoran: Takehito Koyasu
- Mi-chan: Ken'yū Horiuchi
- Cho Hakkai: Yoshirō Matsumoto
- Sa Gojo: Rikiya Koyama
- Gautama Buddha: Kazuya Tatekabe

=== Music ===
- "Patalliro!" (パタリロ!) by Fusako Fujimoto (Patalliro! / Boku Patalliro!)
- "Ajisai Ai Ai Monogatari" (紫陽花アイ愛物語, Hydrangea Ai Love Story) by v-u-den (Patalliro Saiyuki)
- "Utsukushisa wa Tsumi" (美しさは罪, Beauty is Crime) by Eri Takeda. (Patalliro 1st ending)
- "Cock Robin Ondo" (クック=ロビン音頭) by Fuyumi Shiraishi & Slapstick. (Boku Patalliro 1st ending)(from "Who killed Cock Robin?")
- "Nanchū Koi wo Yatterū You Know?" (なんちゅう恋をやってるぅ YOU KNOW?) by Berryz Kobo. (Patalliro Saiyuki)

== Episodes ==
=== Season 1 (1982) ===
No. overall	No. in season	Title	Directed by	Written by	Animation directed by	Art directed by	Original release date	Prod. code
1	1	"The Bishounen Killer"	Nobutaka Nishizawa	Masaki Tsuji	Yoshinori Kanemori	Isamu Tsuchida	April 8, 1982	101
2	2	"A Flower Falls on a Misty Night"	Yoshikatsu Kasai	Masaki Tsuji	Hiroshi Dobashi	Isamu Tsuchida	April 15, 1982	102
3	3	"A Rose Blooms Upon a Grave"	Takashi Hisaoka	Masaki Tsuji	Jiro Tsuno	Isamu Tsuchida	April 22, 1982	103
4	4	"Look Out, Patalliro"	Yugo Serikawa	Akiyoshi Sakai	Masami Abe	Isamu Tsuchida	April 29, 1982	104
5	5	"Maraich, the Angel of Death"	Yoshikatsu Kasai	Tomoko Konparu	Makoto Ito	Nobuto Sakamoto	May 13, 1982	105
6	6	"Etrange's Grief"	Hiroshi Shidara	Tomoko Konparu	Yoshinori Kanemori	Isamu Tsuchida	May 20, 1982	106
7	7	"Kung Fu"	Takashi Hisaoka	Akiyoshi Sakai	Nobumichi Kawamura	Nobuto Sakamoto	May 27, 1982	107
8	8	"From Patalliro with Love"	Yugo Serikawa	Masaki Tsuji	Jirou Tsuno	Isamu Tsuchida	June 3, 1982	108
9	9	"A Cherry Blossom Storm"	Yoshikatsu Kasai	Akiyoshi Sakai	Masami Abe	Nobuto Sakamoto	June 17, 1982	109
10	10	"Snow in Malynera"	Nobutaka Nishizawa	Tomoko Konparu	Yoshinori Kanemori	Isamu Tsuchida	June 24, 1982	110
11	11	"Maraich Maraich"	Takashi Hisaoka	Masaki Tsuji	Makoto Ito	Isamu Tsuchida	July 8, 1982	111
12	12	"A Vampire in Malynera"	Yugo Serikawa	Akiyoshi Sakai	Nobumichi Kawamura	Nobuto Sakamoto	July 22, 1982	112
13	13	"Invasion of America"	Hiroshi Shidara	Akiyoshi Sakai	Jirou Tsuno	Nobuto Sakamoto	July 29, 1982	113
14	14	"Patalliro the 7th and 8th"	Yoshikatsu Kasai	Tomoko Konparu	Yoshinori Kanemori	Isamu Tsuchida	August 12, 1982	114
15	15	"Prince Maraich"	Yugo Serikawa	Akiyoshi Sakai	Masami Abe	Nobuto Sakamoto	August 26, 1982	115
16	16	"Legendary Diamond"	Takashi Hisaoka	Tomoko Konparu	Nobumichi Kawamura	Isamu Tsuchida	September 2, 1982	116
17	17	"Target: Scarlet Mermaid"	Hiroshi Shidara	Masaki Tsuji	Emi Hoshino	Nobuto Sakamoto	September 9, 1982	117
18	18	"Twinkle Twinkle, Tamanegi!"	Yoshikatsu Kasai	Akiyoshi Sakai	Yoshinori Kanemori	Isamu Tsuchida	September 16, 1982	118
19	19	"Journey to the Moon"	Takashi Hisaoka	Akiyoshi Sakai	Masami Abe	Nobuto Sakamoto	September 23, 1982	119
20	20	"Bancoran Is Dead!"	Hiroshi Shidara	Akiyoshi Sakai	Nobumichi Kawamura	Nobuto Sakamoto	September 30, 1982	120

=== Season 2 (1982–83) ===
No. overall	No. in season	Title	Directed by	Written by	Animation directed by	Art directed by	Original release date	Prod. code
21	1	"Super-Robot Plasma X"	Yoshikatsu Kasai	Masaki Tsuji	Makoto Ito	Isamu Tsuchida	October 9, 1982	201
22	2	"Plasma's Love"	Nobutaka Nishizawa	Tomoko Konparu	Yoshinori Kanemori	Nobuto Sakamoto	October 16, 1982	202
23	3	"License to Kill"	Takashi Hisaoka	Masaki Tsuji	Masami Abe	Isamu Tsuchida	October 23, 1982	203
24	4	"Fly Away Jack"	Yoshikatsu Kasai	Masaki Tsuji	Masami Suda	Nobuto Sakamoto	October 30, 1982	204
25	5	"Papa Plasma"	Yasuo Yamayoshi	Tomoko Konparu	Nobumichi Kawamura	Nobuto Sakamoto	November 6, 1982	205
26	6	"Patalliro 8th and 10th"	Hiroshi Shidara	Akiyoshi Sakai	Yoshinori Kanemori	Nobuto Sakamoto	November 13, 1982	206
27	7	"24-Hour Escape"	Yoshikatsu Kasai	Masaki Tsuji	Makoto Ito	Nobuto Sakamoto	November 20, 1982	207
28	8	"The Story of the Loyalty Tree"	Nobutaka Nishizawa	Tomoko Konparu	Masami Suda	Isamu Tsuchida	November 27, 1982	208
29	9	"The Assassin's Return"	Yoshikatsu Kasai & Takashi Hisaoka	Akiyoshi Sakai	Masami Abe	Nobuto Sakamoto	December 4, 1982	209
30	10	"Beloved Purara"	Hiroshi Shidara	Akiyoshi Sakai	Jiro Tsuno	Nobuto Sakamoto	December 11, 1982	210
31	11	"Gelman Castle"	Yasuo Yamayoshi	Tomoko Konparu	Nobumichi Kawamura	Isamu Tsuchida	December 18, 1982	211
32	12	"Nyanko is Nyanko"	Yoshikatsu Kasai	Akiyoshi Sakai	Hiroshi Wagatsuma	Nobuto Sakamoto	December 25, 1982	212
33	13	"I'll Be Waiting"	Yugo Serikawa	Akiyoshi Sakai	Yoshinori Kanemori	Nobuto Sakamoto	January 8, 1983	213
34	14	"Still Purara"	Hiroshi Shidara	Tomoko Konparu	Makoto Ito	Isamu Tsuchida	January 15, 1983	214
35	15	"When the Snow Stopped"	Takashi Hisaoka	Masaki Tsuji	Kuni Tomita	Nobuto Sakamoto	January 22, 1983	215
36	16	"Patalliro's Strangeness"	Yugo Serikawa	Akiyoshi Sakai	Jirou Tsuno	Isamu Tsuchida	January 29, 1983	216
37	17	"Sunflower of Versailles"	Yasuo Yamayoshi	Tomoko Konparu	Nobumichi Kawamura	Nobuto Sakamoto	February 5, 1983	217
38	18	"I Love Maraich"	Nobutaka Nishizawa	Tomomi Tsutsui	Yoshinori Kanemori	Nobuto Sakamoto	February 12, 1983	218
39	19	"That Man Bancoran"	Yoshikatsu Kasai	Akiyoshi Sakai	Hiroshi Wagatsuma	Isamu Tsuchida	February 19, 1983	219
40	20	"Purara's Brother"	Takashi Hisaoka	Tomoko Konparu	Masami Abe	Nobuto Sakamoto	February 26, 1983	220
41	21	"Maraich's Season"	Hiroshi Shidara	Tomomi Tsutsui	Yoshinori Kanemori	Isamu Tsuchida	March 5, 1983	221
42	22	"Patalliro's Great Gathering"	Yasuo Yamayoshi	Akiyoshi Sakai	Nobumichi Kawamura	Isamu Tsuchida	March 12, 1983	222
43	23	"True Love for Bancoran"	Yugo Serikawa	Tomoko Konparu	Jirou Tsuno	Nobuto Sakamoto	March 19, 1983	223
44	24	"Phantom"	Yoshikatsu Kasai	Akiyoshi Sakai	Makoto Ito	Isamu Tsuchida	March 26, 1983	224
45	25	"Ahh... New School Term Amid the Flowers"	Nobutaka Nishizawa	Akiyoshi Sakai	Yoshinori Kanemori	Nobuto Sakamoto	April 8, 1983	225
46	26	"Purara's First Love"	Yoshikatsu Kasai	Tomomi Tsutsui	Shinnosuke Kon	Isamu Tsuchida	April 15, 1983	226
47	27	"Farewell Afro"	Yugo Serikawa	Tomomi Tsutsui	Masami Suda & Masami Abe	Nobuto Sakamoto	April 22, 1983	227
48	28	"Foggy London Airport"	Yasuo Yamayoshi	Tomomi Tsutsui	Nobumichi Kawamura	Isamu Tsuchida	May 6, 1983	228
49	29	"Foggy London Airport"	Yoshikatsu Kasai	Tomomi Tsutsui	Makoto Ito	Isamu Tsuchida	May 13, 1983	229

=== Film (1983) ===
Title	Directed by	Written by	Animation directed by	Art directed by	Original release date
Patalliro! Stardust Keikaku	Nobutaka Nishizawa	Yasuo Tanami	Kinichirou Suzuki	Isamu Tsuchida	July 10, 1983

=== Patalliro Saiyuki! (2005) ===
No.	Title	Directed by	Written by	Animation directed by	Storyboarded by	Original release date
1	"Goku Appears! A Journey for the Scriptures"	Shūji Miyahara	Mitsuyo Suenaga	Katsutoshi Kobayashi	Kenichi Maejima	June 7, 2005
2	"Goku Appears! A Journey for the Scriptures"	Shūji Miyahara	Mitsuyo Suenaga	Katsutoshi Kobayashi	Kenichi Maejima	June 14, 2005
3	"Goku Appears! A Journey for the Scriptures"	Shūji Miyahara	Mitsuyo Suenaga	Katsutoshi Kobayashi	Kenichi Maejima	June 21, 2005
4	"A New Companion! The Journey Begins With Chaos"	Kunitoshi Okajima	Mitsuyo Suenaga	Tsutomu Murakami	Kunitoshi Okajima	June 28, 2005
5	"A New Companion! The Journey Begins With Chaos"	Kunitoshi Okajima	Mitsuyo Suenaga	Tsutomu Murakami	Kunitoshi Okajima	July 5, 2005
6	"A New Companion! The Journey Begins With Chaos"	Kunitoshi Okajima	Mitsuyo Suenaga	Tsutomu Murakami	Kunitoshi Okajima	July 12, 2005
7	"A Raid! The Golden and Silver Demon"	Akira Shimizu	Koji Ueda	Kiyoshi Matsushita	Kenichi Maejima	July 19, 2005
8	"A Raid! The Golden and Silver Demon"	Akira Shimizu	Koji Ueda	Kiyoshi Matsushita	Kenichi Maejima	July 26, 2005
9	"A Raid! The Golden and Silver Demon"	Akira Shimizu	Koji Ueda	Kiyoshi Matsushita	Kenichi Maejima	August 2, 2005
10	"Demon's World Banquet, Sanzou's Great Rescue Operation"	Shūji Miyahara & Shūichi Iizumi	Koji Ueda	Katsutoshi Kobayashi	Kenichi Maejima	August 9, 2005
11	"Demon's World Banquet, Sanzou's Great Rescue Operation"	Shūji Miyahara & Shūichi Iizumi	Koji Ueda	Katsutoshi Kobayashi	Kenichi Maejima	August 16, 2005
12	"Demon's World Banquet, Sanzou's Great Rescue Operation"	Shūji Miyahara & Shūichi Iizumi	Koji Ueda	Katsutoshi Kobayashi	Kenichi Maejima	August 23, 2005
13	"Glossy Manshan Boy's Competition is Full of Danger"	Kiyoshi Fukumoto	Mitsuyo Suenaga	Hideo Maru	Kenichi Maejima	August 30, 2005
14	"Glossy Manshan Boy's Competition is Full of Danger"	Kiyoshi Fukumoto	Mitsuyo Suenaga	Hideo Maru	Kenichi Maejima	September 6, 2005
15	"Glossy Manshan Boy's Competition is Full of Danger"	Kiyoshi Fukumoto	Mitsuyo Suenaga	Hideo Maru	Kenichi Maejima	September 13, 2005
16	"Ruthless Fireworks Red Rays of Lightning Attacks"	Akira Shimizu	Koji Ueda	Kiyoshi Matsushita	Dan Odawara	September 20, 2005
17	"Ruthless Fireworks Red Rays of Lightning Attacks"	Akira Shimizu	Koji Ueda	Kiyoshi Matsushita	Dan Odawara	September 27, 2005
18	"Ruthless Fireworks Red Rays of Lightning Attacks"	Akira Shimizu	Koji Ueda	Kiyoshi Matsushita	Dan Odawara	October 4, 2005
19	"Heavenly Panic! Angel of Love Calls a Storm"	Shūichi Iizumi	Koji Ueda	Katsutoshi Kobayashi	Yasuo Iwamoto	October 11, 2005
20	"Heavenly Panic! Angel of Love Calls a Storm"	Shūichi Iizumi	Koji Ueda	Katsutoshi Kobayashi	Yasuo Iwamoto	October 18, 2005
21	"Heavenly Panic! Angel of Love Calls a Storm"	Shūichi Iizumi	Koji Ueda	Katsutoshi Kobayashi	Yasuo Iwamoto	October 25, 2005
22	"Burning Death Battle! Battle of Flamingo Mountain"	Kiyoshi Fukumoto	Mitsuyo Suenaga	Yoshito Miki	Dan Odawara	November 1, 2005
23	"Burning Death Battle! Battle of Flamingo Mountain"	Kiyoshi Fukumoto	Mitsuyo Suenaga	Yoshito Miki	Dan Odawara	November 8, 2005
24	"Burning Death Battle! Battle of Flamingo Mountain"	Kiyoshi Fukumoto	Mitsuyo Suenaga	Yoshito Miki	Dan Odawara	November 15, 2005
25	"Shenjun Furnace Explosion! Is It? Countdown to Miraculus"	Akira Shimizu	Mitsuyo Suenaga	Shinichi Suzuki	Kenichi Maejima	November 22, 2005
26	"Shenjun Furnace Explosion! Is It? Countdown to Miraculus"	Akira Shimizu	Mitsuyo Suenaga	Shinichi Suzuki	Kenichi Maejima	November 29, 2005
27	"Sanzou's Wedding!? Sasori's Poison is a Sweet Trap"	Akira Shimizu	Mitsuyo Suenaga	Shinichi Suzuki	Kenichi Maejima	November 29, 2005

== Legacy ==
Rock musician Tomoaki Ishizuka took his stage name "Pata" from Patalliro, his nickname in high school as he was said to resemble the series' title character.

Yu Yu Hakusho author Yoshihiro Togashi based his character Hiei's design on Patalliro!
