= Himitsu – Top Secret =

Japanese manga series

- Cover of the DVD of Top Secret ~The Revelation~

秘密 -トップ·シークレット- (Himitsu – Toppu Shiikuretto)
- Genre: Philosophical, science fiction, suspense
- Manga
- Written by: Reiko Shimizu
- Published by: Hakusensha
- Magazine: Melody
- Original run: February 16, 1999 – June 28, 2012
- Volumes: 12
- Anime television series

Top Secret ~The Revelation~
- Directed by: Hiroshi Aoyama
- Produced by: Toshio Nakatani; Manabu Tamura; Yōsuke Kasahara (1-18)
- Written by: Satoshi Suzuki
- Music by: Yoshihisa Hirano
- Studio: Madhouse (Note: Animation production assistance (アニメーション制作協力) for all episodes provided by Mook Animation.)
- Original network: NTV
- Original run: April 8, 2008 – September 30, 2008
- Episodes: 26
- Manga

Himitsu – Season 0
- Written by: Reiko Shimizu
- Published by: Hakusensha
- Magazine: Melody
- Original run: October 28, 2012 – present
- Volumes: 12
- Live-action film
- Directed by: Keishi Ohtomo
- Produced by: Hirotaka Aragaki; Shinji Ogawa; Satoshi Fukushima
- Written by: Izumi Takahashi; Keishi Ohtomo; Lee Sork-jun; Kim Sun-mee
- Music by: Naoki Satō
- Studio: Shochiku
- Released: August 6, 2016
- Runtime: 148 minutes
- Television drama

The Top Secret
- Directed by: Kana Matsumoto; Tadaaki Hōrai
- Written by: Shimako Satō
- Studio: Kansai TV
- Original network: FNS (Kansai TV, Fuji TV)
- Original run: January 20, 2025 – April 7, 2025
- Episodes: 11

Himitsu – Top Secret (Japanese: 秘密 -トップ·シークレット-, Hepburn: Himitsu - Toppu Shiikuretto -; lit. Secret - Top Secret) is a Japanese manga series written and illustrated by Reiko Shimizu. It has been serialized in the shojo manga magazine Melody. A prequel Himitsu – Season 0 (Japanese: 秘密 season 0 -, Hepburn: lit. Secret - Season 0) began serializing in the same magazine in 2012.

It has been adapted into an anime series, Top Secret ~The Revelation~ (秘密(トップ·シークレット) 〜The Revelation〜), by Madhouse and broadcast in Japan on NTV between April 8, 2008, and September 30, 2008.

A television drama titled The Top Secret (秘密 〜THE TOP SECRET〜, Himitsu ~THE TOP SECRET~) premiered on Kansai TV, Fuji Television and other FNS stations on January 20, 2025.

== Plot ==
The story takes place five decades from now when brain scanners have been perfected to the point that the government can retrieve up to five years' worth of memories from people's minds — even if they are dead. The investigators of the National Research Institute of Police Science's 9th Forensics Laboratory must weigh the ethical choices in the ultimate invasion of privacy as they delve into people's minds to solve crimes.

== Characters ==
- Tsuyoshi Maki (薪剛, Maki Tsuyoshi) Voiced by: Tomokazu Seki, Played by: Toma Ikuta (movie version), Rihito Itagaki (drama version)

The Director of Section Nine (Ninth). He is a young, beautiful, androgynous man in his 30s whose youthful looks always gets him mistaken for a teenager. He leads his force with strict but fair rules. He used to be more open but became closed off after having to shoot his best friend and colleague, Suzuki during an investigation into the Kainuma murder case. The case also takes out the whole Ninth unit except Maki at the time, with his other subordinates dying and only one left to survive although he becomes incapacitated. He would continue to struggle with the guilt of killing Suzuki and the burden of knowing Suzuki sacrificed his life for him despite maintaining a cold and tough exterior and continuing his job after Suzuki's death.

It is later revealed in episodes 12–13 that he saved a man from starvation but this man became obsessed with Maki and became a serial murder who murdered 28 boys while alive before committing suicide and hypnotizing ten other boys to commit suicide (though one survives) as these boys all looked like Maki and he wanted to torture and make them suffer the way he wanted to make Maki suffer because he loved and hated him. Despite being colder and more closed off after this incident, he still ultimately retains a kind heart and good sense of justice and is respected and retains the loyalty of his subordinates.

He is initially conscious of Aoki due to his similarities to the late Suzuki, but he also favors him among the newcomers and grows closer to him throughout the series. Maki's life is constantly in danger due to the nature of his job and the value of the information in his brain. Because of this, he refuses to have a personal life and does not like disclosing it to others. He also constantly wears a bulletproof vest underneath his suit to ensure that if he is killed, it has to be via a shot to the head, essentially destroying his brain from being misused. Despite that, he does not wish the same fate on his subordinates and wishes that they would have thriving personal lives. Maki quits the Ninth and heads the MRI Development International Project (MDIP) in New York after the final showdown with Takizawa.

It is heavily implied that he has romantic feelings for Aoki despite supporting Aoki and Yukiko's relationship and wanting to see them get married. After the Ninth disbands and Maki moves overseas, he maintains correspondence with Aoki. When Aoki sends him a picture of himself and his orphaned niece Mai, whom he now raises, Maki hangs the picture on the wall in his Paris office, a gesture that surprises his colleagues due to his mysterious personal life. Maki is even shown crying as he looks at the picture. Even though Maki reveals to an interviewer that he no longer has any secrets and would not mind his brain being scanned, it is implied that Maki's only secret now is how precious he thinks of Aoki and his desire to protect Aoki for as long as he lives. He acknowledges that these feelings happen beyond his control.

- Ikkou Aoki (青木一行, Aoki Ikkou) Voiced by: Daisuke Namikawa, Played by: Masaki Okada (movie version, Yuto Nakajima (drama version)

The main protagonist. He is a young bespectacled man recently assigned to Section nine. He is kind, earnest and hard working. His ability to read people's lips helps greatly when investigating deaths. He can also fly a helicopter. He is shown to be a huge admirer of Maki, wanting to join the Ninth just to work with Maki. He heavily empathizes with the victims and having to reveal their secrets. He falls for the much older Yukiko who happens to be Suzuki's lover before his death and they eventually get engaged.

When his sister and brother-in-law are murdered, Aoki accepts the reality that being an investigator in the Ninth comes with a safety risk, extending to his loved ones. He breaks off the engagement with Yukiko, wishing for her safety. During the showdown with Takizawa, Aoki stops Maki's request to shoot him by hugging Maki and telling Maki he likes him, and for Maki to stop blaming himself. When the Ninth officially disbands to create precincts across the country, Aoki is promoted to become the Chief of Precinct 8 in Kyushu.

Aoki is smart, tenacious, brave, and reliable. He does not give up despite the challenges of working with someone like Maki, even when Maki tells him to quit. When he gets haunted by visions of the MRI brain scans that shock him enough until he faints, he still carries on without giving up. When the situation calls for it, he would go against Maki's orders or act without Maki's knowledge. He views Suzuki's memories after finding out about his resemblance to Suzuki as well as the tragic story of Suzuki's death. Viewing Suzuki's memories exposes himself to the Kainuma case but like Maki, Aoki overcomes the challenges to stay sane and alive. When his sister and brother-in-law are murdered, he remains calm and collected and begs to partake in the investigation behind their deaths despite the gruesome nature and incredible pressure of being blamed for their deaths by his own mother. He also volunteers to be infected with a deadly virus, just to catch a killer, despite being told off by Maki that their unit does not deal with active police work.

It is heavily implied that Aoki harbours romantic feelings for Maki, even while engaged to Yukiko. In fact, it is speculated that his feelings for Yukiko is influenced by Suzuki's memories. While investigating the household massacre case and Maki suggests that it is the work of a copycat killer inspired by an old TV show the killer watched, Aoki begins to dream of Suzuki's memories involving Yukiko, and at times he confuses himself as Suzuki, even dreaming of proposing to Yukiko. Aoki gets agitated as if connecting the dots to his own life, him being the copycat in pursuing Yukiko just because he sees Suzuki's love for Yukiko.

However, his feelings for Maki is oftentimes underlying and it appears that Aoki himself is unaware about them. For instance, Aoki breaks up with Yukiko to ensure her safety after his family members were killed because of him. However, he is unable to quit the Ninth and cut ties with Maki to ensure Maki's safety. Later, when Maki transfers to Paris to continue his MRI development work, they continue to correspond via letters, with Aoki updating Maki about his life raising Mai, his niece. It seems that since it is unlikely Maki and Aoki could work together again due to their different career trajectories, Aoki seems more open to pursue something more. In one of the letters, Aoki asks Maki if he could spend time with Maki after work until Maki needs to go to work the next day, and expresses his intention to know more about Maki's personal life and to share his own with Maki. He expresses his wish to spend everyday together even for a short time, calling Maki as someone like a family. He never ends up sending that letter, settling for just a photo of himself and Mai, which Maki ends up hanging on the wall in his office.

- Yukiko Miyoshi (三好由紀子, Miyoshi Yukiko) Played by: Chiaki Kuriyama (movie version), Mugi Kadowaki (drama version)

Suzuki's lover prior to his death and friend to Maki. She is a 35-year-old formidable woman and doctor/ medical examiner of Section One who has a strange habit of falling asleep on autopsy tables and refers to the deceased as her "lovers". She has bad luck with men. She is strong, independent, stubborn to a fault and a formidable opponent with martial arts experience. She is nonetheless kind and devoted to helping others.

She has a complicated relationship with Maki, despite being same-age friends from university. She is the only one who calls Maki with his given name, but Maki maintains formal speech with her, causing her annoyance. It is implied that she harbours a crush on Maki despite dating Suzuki and later Aoki. Aoki, through his own observation and Suzuki's memory, notices this, especially when he discovers that Suzuki cancelled his proposal when he noticed Yukiko staring intently at Maki, suggesting Suzuki knew about Yukiko's hidden feelings. Additionally, when Yukiko meets up with her college friend Aoi who is handing out her wedding invitation, Aoi wonders why Yukiko stays at her job even after Suzuki's death. When Aoi mentions Maki, and how Yukiko hates him because she could never best him in college, and wonders whether that actually makes Yukiko likes Maki, Yukiko grows extremely flustered. However, Yukiko never explicitly pursues any relationship with Maki, and is shown to continue to value Suzuki's memories. When she contracts a virus from an autopsy and almost dies, she is not scared, thinking it would reunite her with Suzuki. She almost quits her job afterwards, but stays due to Aoki's plea.

Despite reservations on their 12-year age gap and Aoki's resemblance to Suzuki, she falls for him and eventually gets engaged to Aoki, earning his family's approval along the way. When Aoki's sister and brother-in-law are murdered, she steps in to support Aoki and care for his orphaned niece and elderly mother. However, due to the increasing concern on the safety of the investigators of the Ninth and potential threats against their loved ones, Aoki makes the tough decision to break their engagement off, wishing for her safety and not wanting to burden her with caring for his family. Even after things settle down and the Ninth disbands, Yukiko and Aoki do not get back together and the final panel of the manga shows her wedding photo to another man, with Maki and Aoki together in the frame.

- Yasufumi Okabe (岡部靖文, Okabe Yasufumi) Voiced by: Kousuke Meguro, Played by: Yusuke Hirayama

One of the older members of Section Nine. He is older and has more experience with some of the darker cases Section nine has to go through. He is married to a designer. Initially a member of Section One who is actively involved in traditional police work, he is skeptical of the work done by the Ninth and views the MRI technology negatively. However, he is transferred to the Ninth after Suzuki's death to secretly observe Maki's competence to continue leading the Ninth. Okabe grows to respect and admire Maki instead, becoming a genuine friend and ally for Maki to rely on and appreciating MRI technology's usefulness in investigation. When the Ninth disbands to set up precincts across the country, Okabe is promoted as Chief of Precinct 3 in Kanto

- Takahashi Soga (曽我孝, Soga Takahashi) Voiced by: Kenji Hamada

A man with a strong sense of justice and is a recent graduate from the police academy. Because he is a newcomer, he tends to be impulsive and needs to gain more experience.

- Satoshi Onogida (小野木田聖, Onogida Satoshi) Voiced by: Mitsuaki Madono

A scientist in charge of setting up, programming and monitoring the MRI that connects to the victim's brains and shows the images they saw through their memories during their life. He is the student of Professor Schubert who created the MRI system and best friend of American John Considince a world specialist in bionics who helped him repair the MRI machine after Suzuki shot it. John was killed a week before Onogida himself is murdered after Aoki helps him realize someone was stealing MRI data and selling it elsewhere and Onogida himself uncovers a bigger secret before his untimely death.

- Michiru Sendou (仙道みちる, Sendou Michiru) Voiced by: Eri Sendai

A technician that works with and monitors the machinery alongside Onogida. She admired Onogida and is particularly heartbroken when he dies.

- Katsuhiro Suzuki (鈴木克洋, Suzuki Katsuhiro) Played by: Tori Matsuzaka (movie version), Yuto Nakajima (drama version)

Maki's best friend whom he was forced to shoot a year and a half prior to the start of the series. He is similar to Aoki in their earnest personalities and the air around them. It is revealed that in order to spare Maki the grief and guilt of having been indirectly responsible for inspiring a man to become a serial murderer, Suzuki decided to look at the criminal's mind. However, the mind was so warped with lust towards killing those boys that it drove Suzuki insane and, not wanting Maki to see this and be tainted and "infected", destroyed the MRI machine and begged for Maki to shoot him. It is revealed part of the data of Kainuma's memory is missing and it was these files that drove Suzuki insane because by seeing Kainuma's memories Kainuma was able to place a hypnosis spell on Suzuki and anyone who saw the footage, which Suzuki realized and decided must be destroyed so there would be no other victims. He dated Yukiko when alive but never wanted to settle down with her due to the nature of his job in Ninth.

- Nanako Amachi (天地奈々子, Amachi Nanako) Voiced by: Ai Nonaka, Played by: Haruka Kinami

One of the members of section nine. She is kind and playful and close friends with Maki. She reveals an ability of psychometry, or an ability to hear and feel emotions from objects of strong personal value. She showed romantic interest in Aoki but nothing came of it as she is murdered in episode 23.

- Masachika Nagamine (長嶺昌親, Nagamine Masachika)

A stuck up self-centered man who wishes to use MRI to his own benefit and vice Director of Section Nine and leader of the Committee and does not care about the well-being of others, even once sending criminals to suicide as part of an experiment. He constantly clashes with Maki and is ultimately killed in episode 26.

== Anime ==
The anime uses two pieces of theme music. "Kokoro Film" (ココロフィルム, Kokoro Firumu) by ALvino is the opening theme, while "Kemuri" (煙; lit. smoke) by Maki Chang is the ending theme.

=== Episode list ===
No.	Title	Original release date
1	"The Brain and Man's Journey"; Transliteration: "Nou to tabi suru otoko" (Japanese: 脳と旅する男)	April 8, 2008
A woman is murdered right outside her home, but the suspect is a man who was thought to have been dead for years.
2	"Top Secret (Part One)"; Transliteration: "Toppu shīkuretto (zenpen)" (Japanese: トップシークレット(前編))	April 15, 2008
The President is murdered, but his only priority upon dying is to dispose of a photo and memo taken from his wallet.
3	"Top Secret (Part Two)"; Transliteration: "Toppu shīkuretto (kouhen)" (Japanese: トップシークレット(後編))	April 22, 2008
4	"Joyful Song"; Transliteration: "Koufuku na Uta" (Japanese: 幸福な歌)	April 29, 2008
A group of elderly men are killed when the van they were riding in rolls off a cliff and into the sea. Upon viewing their memories, a sad truth is revealed.
5	"Kinuko (First Part)"; Transliteration: "Kinuko (zenpen)" (Japanese: キヌコ(前編))	May 6, 2008
A man who brutally killed his family is finally executed, but upon viewing his memories of the incident, it is revealed that an entirely different scenario took place.
6	"Kinuko (Last Part)"; Transliteration: "Kinuko (kouhen)" (Japanese: キヌコ(後編))	May 13, 2008
7	"Hidden Face"; Transliteration: "Mienai Kao" (Japanese: 見えない顔)	May 20, 2008
A wealthy businessman dies in a fire, but upon viewing his memories, it is discovered that he left his inheritance to a young girl who claims to have never met him.
8	"Remodeling"; Transliteration: "Kaizou" (Japanese: 改造)	May 27, 2008
A young woman is killed during an extreme body modification ceremony and the team must discover the culprit before another person is killed.
9	"*(Asterisk)"; Transliteration: "*(Asutarisuku)" (Japanese: *(アスタリスク))	June 3, 2008
An elderly man sacrifices his own life in order to save a woman from a serial killer who leaves an asterisk mark on his victims.
10	"Wind Inside the Box"; Transliteration: "Hako no naka no kaze" (Japanese: 箱の中の鼠)	June 10, 2008
Inmates awaiting execution are murdered during blackouts in a facility, but the team only has a limited time to find the culprit.
11	"Don't Reach For That Neck"; Transliteration: "Sono kubi ni te wo dasu na" (Japanese: その首に手を出すな)	June 17, 2008
A man is murdered in a small village and Aoki is sent to retrieve the body, but it seems as though someone doesn't want the murderer to be revealed.
12	"Client (First Part)"; Transliteration: "Raihou sha (zenpen)" (Japanese: 来訪者(前編))	June 24, 2008
A group of teenage boys commit suicide and it soon comes to light that they are related to an earlier case that forced Maki to kill his best friend.
13	"Client (Last Part)"; Transliteration: "Raihou sha (kouhen)" (Japanese: 来訪者(後編))	July 1, 2008
14	"The Woman's Red High Heels"; Transliteration: "Akai haihiiru no onna" (Japanese: 赤いハイヒールの女)	July 8, 2008
A designer shoemaker is murdered and the only clue is his memory of red high-heel shoes.
15	"Lament"; Transliteration: "Aika" (Japanese: 哀歌)	June 15, 2008
A young man takes a woman and her baby hostage and his only demand is to have Section Nine view the memories of a prominent man who recently died.
16	"Final Take"; Transliteration: "Fainaru·Teiku" (Japanese: ファイナル·テイク)	July 22, 2008
A famous film director is murdered by a person wearing a Hannya mask and the only clue they have is a woman named Sumire who doesn't exist.
17	"Witness"; Transliteration: "Mokugeki" (Japanese: 目撃)	June 29, 2008
The murder of two police officers leads to the truth behind a secret that was meant to be forgotten.
18	"No One Is Watching (Part 1)"; Transliteration: "Daremo miteinai (zenpen)" (Japanese: 誰も見ていない(前編))	August 5, 2008
19	"No One Is Watching (Part 2)"; Transliteration: "Daremo miteinai (chuuhen)" (Japanese: 誰も見ていない(中編))	August 12, 2008
20	"No One Is Watching (Final Part)"; Transliteration: "Daremo miteinai (kouhen)" (Japanese: 誰も見ていない(後編))	August 19, 2008
21	"Infringement"; Transliteration: "Shinshoku" (Japanese: 侵食)	August 26, 2008
22	"Countdown"; Transliteration: "Kauntodaun" (Japanese: カウントダウン)	September 2, 2008
23	"Search My Body (Part One)"; Transliteration: "Search My Body (zenpen)" (Japanese: Search My Body(前編))	September 9, 2008
The team receives a brain, but it is discovered to belong to Amachi, who had recently gone missing.
24	"Search My Body (Part Two)"; Transliteration: "Search My Body (kouhen)" (Japanese: Search My Body(後編))	September 16, 2008
The team searches Amachi's dreams for clues to the whereabouts of her body and the identity of the person responsible.
25	"Sacrifice"; Transliteration: "Sakurifaisu" (Japanese: 犠牲(サクリファイス))	September 23, 2008
26	"Paradisus"; Transliteration: "Rakuen (Paradisosu)" (Japanese: 楽園(パラディソス))	September 30, 2008

== Reception ==
The Himitsu – Top Secret has been recommended by a jury at the 2007 Japan Media Arts Festival and again in 2008, and was awarded the Excellence Award in 2011.

The fourth volume of Himitsu – Top Secret was ranked 4th on the Tohan charts between January 29 and February 4, 2008. The fifth volume of Himitsu – Top Secret was ranked 5th on the Tohan Charts between July 29 and August 4, 2008. The sixth volume of Himitsu – Top Secret was ranked 29th and 23rd between February 24 and March 9, 2008. The seventh volume of Himitsu – Top Secret was ranked 11th on the Tohan charts between October 26 and November 1, 2009, and 28th the following week.
