= Kimi no Kakera =

Japanese manga series by Shin Takahashi

- First tankōbon volume, featuring Shiro

きみのカケラ
- Genre: Adventure, fantasy
- Manga
- Written by: Shin Takahashi
- Published by: Shogakukan
- Imprint: Shōnen Sunday Comics
- Magazine: Weekly Shōnen Sunday; (August 21, 2002 – March 3, 2004)
- Original run: August 21, 2002 – July 16, 2010
- Volumes: 9
- icon

Kimi no Kakera (きみのカケラ; lit. 'Pieces of You') is a Japanese manga series written and illustrated by Shin Takahashi. It was serialized in Shogakukan's Weekly Shōnen Sunday from August 2002 to March 2004; however, Takahashi stopped its serialization and the series continued directly via tankōbon volumes. A total of nine tankōbon volumes were published from January 2003 to July 2010. A two-chapter story, titled Spica, was published in Weekly Shōnen Sunday in 2010 and 2013.

== Story ==
Ikoro is a thirteen-year-old girl who is the princess of the "Upper World", a world where snow is always falling and even princesses like her are forced to wake up at 4 a.m. and go to bed at midnight, learning and working the rest of the day. The Upper World is a "country of night", surrounded on four sides by towering walls and with perpetual below-freezing temperatures. Ikoro lives with her blind young brother Mataku and her servants Shā (or "Gramma") and the monkey-like Kuro. Her parents have left them apparently seeking out the legend of a "sun".

One day, Ikoro's dinner with her brother is interrupted by a strange boy crashing through the ceiling. Ikoro finds that the boy is wearing manacles and has white hair. The boy has lost his memory and is dubbed "Shiro". Ikoro and Shiro are both hitogatas (ヒトガタ), which means that she cannot feel joy and he cannot feel pain. The two of them go towards the "Lower World" deciding that they will find a sun.

== Characters ==
Shiro (left) and Ikoro (right)

Ikoro (イコロ)
Princess of the snow country, a 13-year-old prodigy who has skipped 6 grades and has only books as her constant companionship. She is constantly ostracized as a result of her inability to smile and the declining position of the royal house. Her proper name is Kamuy-poro-cise-ikoro (カムイ・ポロ・チセ・イコロ), which in the ancient language of her country (Ainu) literally means "God-large-house-treasure".
Shiro (シロ)
An amnesiac boy who cannot feel pain. Ikoro names him "Shiro" based on his white hair, but it also means "missing piece" in the ancient language of her country. His constant question, "Are you foe or friend?", is supposedly a teaching from his grandfather, the man who brought him up.
Mataku (マタク)
Ikoro's blind younger brother.

== Publication ==
Written and illustrated by Shin Takahashi, Kimi no Kakera started in Shogakukan's Weekly Shōnen Sunday on August 21, 2002. (Note: The series started in the magazine's 38th issue of 2002 (with cover date September 4), released on August 21 of that same year.) It went on hiatus after its 29th chapter, released in the April 2, 2003, issue. It resumed publication in the magazine for ten chapters from December 24, 2003, to March 3, 2004. (Note: The series resumed in the magazine's combined fourth and fifth issues of 2004 (with cover date January 8), released on December 24, 2003; the last chapter published in the magazine appeared in the 14th issue of 2004 (with cover date March 17), released on March 3 of that same year.) The series then continued publication directly via tankōbon volumes. The series' first six volumes were published by Shogakukan from January 18, 2003, to August 10, 2007. The seventh volume was released, after a two-year and two-month hiatus, on October 16, 2009. The final eighth and ninth volumes were released on January 18 and July 16, 2010.

A short story, titled Spica: The Twin Stars of "Kimi no Kakera (スピカ The twin STARS of "きみのカケラ"), was published in Weekly Shōnen Sunday on July 21, 2010. Another story, titled Spica: A Little Afterschool Star (スピカ-放課後のちいさな星-, Supika Hōkago no Chīsana Hoshi), was published in the same magazine on July 3, 2013. These chapters were published by Shogakukan in a volume, which included another story, on August 16, 2013.

=== Volumes ===
No.	Japanese release date	Japanese ISBN
1	January 18, 2003	978-4-09-126611-8
2	November 18, 2003	978-4-09-126612-5
3	August 6, 2004	978-4-09-126613-2
4	March 18, 2005	978-4-09-126614-9
5	January 18, 2006	978-4-09-126615-6
6	August 10, 2007	978-4-09-120050-1
7	October 16, 2009	978-4-09-122047-9
8	January 18, 2010	978-4-09-122227-5
9	July 16, 2010	978-4-09-122473-6
