= Suzuki-kun's Mindful Life =

Japanese manga series

- First tankōbon volume cover

寿々木君のていねいな生活 (Suzuki-kun no Teinei na Seikatsu)
- Genre: Slice of life
- Manga
- Written by: Yuki Fujimoto
- Published by: Hakusensha
- English publisher: NA: Yen Press
- Imprint: HC Special
- Magazine: Melody
- Original run: June 28, 2022 – present
- Volumes: 4

Suzuki-kun's Mindful Life (寿々木君のていねいな生活, Suzuki-kun no Teinei na Seikatsu) is a Japanese manga series written and illustrated by Yuki Fujimoto. It began serialization in Hakusensha's Melody magazine in June 2022.

== Synopsis ==
Kaoru Suzuki is a large student who gives off an intimidating aura, which often leads to people picking on him. However, despite his appearance, Kaoru is a gentle giant who loves baking sweets and tending to plants. When Kaoru gets targeted by an intoxicated man, an attractive male student named Arata Haruna comes to his rescue and the two become friends.

== Publication ==
Written and illustrated by Yuki Fujimoto, Suzuki-kun's Mindful Life began serialization in Hakusensha's Melody magazine on June 28, 2022. Its chapters have been collected into four tankōbon volumes as of August 2026.

On February 7, 2025, Yen Press announced that they had licensed the series for English publication beginning in July 2025.

No.	Original release date	Original ISBN	North American release date	North American ISBN
1	August 4, 2023	978-4-592-22251-4	July 22, 2025	979-8-8554-0813-3
Chapters 1–6
2	August 5, 2024	978-4-592-22252-1	December 16, 2025	979-8-8554-1919-1
Chapters 7–12
3	August 5, 2025	978-4-592-22253-8	—	—
4	August 5, 2026	978-4-592-22254-5	—	—

== Reception ==
The series was nominated for the 14th Anan Manga Award in 2023. It won the 15th edition in 2024. The series was ranked 12th in the 2025 edition of Takarajimasha's Kono Manga ga Sugoi! guidebook's list of best manga for female readers. The series was ranked tenth in the 4th Crea Late Night Manga Award in 2025 hosted by Bungeishunjū's Crea magazine.
