= Kami o Kiri ni Kimashita =

Japanese manga series

- First tankōbon volume cover

髪を切りに来ました。
- Genre: Drama; Iyashikei
- Manga
- Written by: Shin Takahashi
- Published by: Hakusensha
- Magazine: Melody
- Original run: April 27, 2019 – present
- Volumes: 5

Kami o Kiri ni Kimashita (髪を切りに来ました。; lit. "I've Come to Cut Your Hair") is a Japanese manga series written and illustrated by Shin Takahashi. It has been serialized in Hakusensha's shōjo magazine Melody since April 2019, with its chapters collected in five tankōbon volumes as of July 2022. the manga has also been serialized on Manga Park app since November 2020.

== Publication ==
Written and illustrated by Shin Takahashi, Kami o Kiri ni Kimashita started in Hakusensha's shōjo magazine Melody on April 27, 2019. Hakusensha has collected its chapters into individual tankōbon volumes. The first volume was released on March 5, 2020. As of July 5, 2022, five volumes have been released. Since November 5, 2020, the manga has also been distributed on Manga Park app. In France, the manga is licensed by Delcourt/Tonkam.

=== Volumes ===
No.	Release date	ISBN
1	March 5, 2020	978-4-59221-768-8
2	November 5, 2020	978-4-59221-769-5
3	April 5, 2021	978-4-59221-770-1
4	September 3, 2021	978-4-59222-241-5
5	July 5, 2022	978-4-59222-242-2
