= Moon Child (manga) =

Japanese manga by Reiko Shimizu

月の子 (Tsuki no Ko)
- Manga
- Written by: Reiko Shimizu
- Published by: Hakusensha
- English publisher: NA: CMX Manga
- Magazine: LaLa
- Original run: February 1989 – April 1993
- Volumes: 13

Moon Child (月の子, Tsuki no Ko) is a Japanese manga written and illustrated by Reiko Shimizu. It was serialized in Hakusensha's magazine, LaLa. It was licensed in North America by CMX Manga until 2010 when the company went defunct. In August 2026, Comikey Media announced that they were licensing several Hakusensha series, including Moon Child on their X account with Moon Child on the announcement image. Although they claim these series will be in English for the "first time", that is not the case for Moon Child. The manga has been adapted into a theatrical interpretation of itself by Studio Life.

The story involves a prophecy about the offspring of an alien and a human, who might either save or destroy the world. The manga plays with issues of gender and mystery. It falls into the demographic of shōjo and the genre of science fiction.

== Manga ==
Moon Child is written and illustrated by Reiko Shimizu. Hakusensha released the manga's 13 bound volumes between February 1989 and April 1993. CMX Manga released the manga's 13 tankōbon volumes in English between December 1, 2005, and June 9, 2009.
