= Hana Yori mo Hana no Gotoku =

Manga based on Noh theatre

花よりも花の如く
- Manga
- Written by: Minako Narita
- Published by: Hakusensha
- Magazine: Melody
- Original run: 2001 – 2025
- Volumes: 24

Hana Yori mo Hana no Gotoku (花よりも花の如く; 'More Flower-like Than Flowers') is a manga series written and illustrated by Minako Narita. The individual chapters were collected into twenty-four tankōbon volumes, which were published by Hakusensha from July 5, 2003, to February 5, 2026.

== Plot ==
The story follows Norito Sakakibara, a young man who apprentices as a Noh performer with the aim of eventually becoming a Noh master.

== Reception ==
=== Sales ===
- Volume 6 has sold 84,443 copies (as of November 17, 2008)
- Volume 7 has sold 77,390 copies (as of May 10, 2009)
- Volume 8 has sold 68,782 copies (as of July 11, 2010)
- Volume 9 has sold 66,575 (as of July 10, 2011)
- Volume 10 had sold 67,085 copies (as of March 11, 2012)
- Volume 11 has sold 79,762 copies (as of January 13, 2013)
- As of February 28, 2017, the series has over 2 million copies in circulation.
