= Shin Takahashi =

Japanese manga artist

- Born: September 8, 1967 (age 59); Shibetsu, Hokkaido, Japan
- Occupation: Manga artist
- Known for: Saikano, Kimi no Kakera
- Website: www.sinpre.com

Shin Takahashi (高橋しん, originally 高橋 真, Takahashi Shin; born September 8, 1967) is a Japanese manga artist. He is best known for his series Saikano (She, the Ultimate Weapon) and Kimi no Kakera. Inio Asano had a brief stint as his assistant during the creation of Saikano.

== Works ==
- Ii Hito (1993–1999)
  - Bye Bye, Papa (2002)
- Suki ni Naru Hito (1999)
- Saikano (1999–2001)
  - Love Story, Killed (2002)
- Kimi no Kakera (Your Fragment) (2002–2010)
- Hana to Oku-tan (2007–2019)
- Yuki ni Tsubasa (Wings in the Snow) (2011–2013), Weekly Young Magazine, 8 volumes
  - Yuki ni Tsubasa Haru (2014–2015), Weekly Young Magazine, 8 volumes
- Kanata-Kakeru (かなたかける) (2016–2018), Big Comic Spirits, 10 volumes
- Road to You -Kimi he to Tsuzuku Michi (short anime) (2017) — Character designs
- Kami o Kiri ni Kimashita (2019–present)
- Ekiden Danshi Project (2022–present), Big Comic Spirits
