= Hoshi wo Sagashite... =

1988 video game

- Developer: Sega
- Publisher: Sega
- Artist: Rieko Kodama
- Writer: Miki Morimoto
- Platform: Master System
- Release: JP: April 2, 1988
- Genre: Adventure
- Mode: Single-player

Hoshi wo Sagashite... (Note: Japanese: 星をさがして・・・, Hepburn: lit. 'Searching for the Stars') is a 1988 adventure game developed and published by Sega for the Mark III/Master System. The game uses the same science fiction setting as Sega's Phantasy Star (1987) and is about a space pilot who gets an egg as a gift for his girlfriend, which hatches into the alien creature Mio. The rest of the game involves finding clues about Mio's origin.

The game is menu-based and involves the player picking various options from a side-panel to progress. The narrative and planning was by Miki Morimoto and was her first Master System game as a planner. The game was only released in Japan, and received mediocre reviews from publications like Comptiq and Beep. Retro Gamer described the game as becoming "more renowned in recent years" in 2025 due to the English fan translation being released. From retrospective reviews, Steven Barbato of Hardcore Gaming 101 complimented the game for its colorful presentation and relaxing compelling gameplay.

== Plot ==
Hoshi wo Sagashite... takes place in a science fiction story set in the same world as Phantasy Star (1987). The player controls Roy, a space pilot who gets a gift for his girlfriend Lila from a shady dealer. He chooses an egg and not long after getting it home, it hatches Mio, a cute bear-like creature that was believed to be extinct. Roy then travels between planets and searches for any potential leads to learn more about Mio and the secret location of Mio's homeland.

== Gameplay ==
Gameplay in Hoshi wo Sagashite.... The player navigates a menu-based system panel while the current situation is displayed in the graphic panel.

Hoshi wo Sagashite... is a menu-driven adventure game that takes place in the same solar system as Phantasy Star. The game is controlled with a text-based interface that has multiple commands. The player chooses and gives commands to a situation which will effect the scenes in the story through selection or cancelling action options from the right side panel such as "talk", "Look", "Eat" and "Take". There are several ways the game can end, such as choosing to crack Mio's egg prematurely. Some options will lead to a happy ending for the characters, while others can cause Shimio to die. The player can quit the game at any point and return via a password system.

== Production ==
Miki Morimoto, who is credited as "GamerMiki", worked at Sega and her first work for planning a game was for Hoshi wo Sagashite…. The story of the game was created by Morimoto. Reflecting on Hoshi wo Sagashite… in an interview published in 1991, she said that she wished she had focused more on raising the Mio creatures within the game. When asked about the true ending from its multiple endings, she responded that she did not believe there was an official ending and it was left for the player to interpret.

Rieko Kodama worked on the graphics under the name "Phenix Rie". Kodama first worked with Sega on The Mark III hardware creating graphics for Champion Boxing (1984) and still made graphics for the system as recently as Phantasy Star (1988). She described making graphics for the system as being "a real struggle" as it allowed for very few colors.

== Release and reception ==
Hoshi wo Sagashite... was released in Japan on April 2, 1988, for the Mark III. It was one of the few games for the system that remained exclusive to Japan. Hoshi wo Sagashite... reached the second highest place in Famicom Tsūshin Top 10 Selling Sega games on May 20, 1988.

From contemporary reviews, an anonymous writer in Comptiq found that the game might not be satisfying for players who wanted a more difficult adventure game, but would be perfect for people that enjoy graphics and conversations with the characters. They found the ending "quite moving". In Beep, a reviewer said the game was neither good nor bad, recommending it to fans of Sega.

In a 2025 overview of the Master System, Nick Thorpe of Retro Gamer described the game as becoming "more renowned in recent years" due to the English fan translation being released. From retrospective reviews, Steven Barbato of Hardcore Gaming 101 complimented the game for its colorful presentation and relaxing compelling gameplay. Barbato said the games only real weakness was its tendency to rely on unintuitive choices to progress the story that he described as "typical of Japanese adventure games of the era."

== See also ==
- Video games in Japan
- List of Master System games
- List of Sega video games
