= Britney Hamada =

Japanese manga artist (born 1979/80)

Britney Hamada 浜田 ブリトニー
- Born: Sugako Hamada; 1979 or 1980 (age 46–47) Chiba, Chiba, Japan
- Areas: Manga artist; television personality
- Notable works: Pagyaru!

Sugako Hamada (浜田 菅子, Hamada Sugako), known professionally as Britney Hamada (浜田 ブリトニー, Hamada Buritonī) is a Japanese manga artist and tarento. Affiliated with Ever Green Entertainment, she founded Piece Eight Co. Ltd. She appeared as a judge at the World Cosplay Summit 2009

== Early life and career ==
Britney Hamada was born in Chiba, Chiba as Hamada Sugako. She took her professional from Sugawara no Michizane. Her father is from Kyushu and she has an elder brother and a mother and is married.

After graduating from high school she went to a vocational school with the aim of becoming a trimmer, but as the commute took more than four hours from her parents' house, she got tired of it (she said that she is a "petit runaway"). After graduating from the vocational school, she read the manga Manga Michi depicting the half-life of Fujiko Fujio A, and was impressed. She entered the professional training course at the Nihon Manga Juku Daytime Department in April 2005.

Half a year after entering Japanese Manga Juku, Hamada's work was selected for the school's Best Work Award. Hamada brought in the editorial department of Big Comic Spirits. While listening to her story, an interested editor suggested that she try to draw about herself, and she decided to draw a gyaru manga.

== Manga artist activities ==
Her pen name was inspired by Britney Spears. In addition, Harada also considered "Hilton Hamada," "Beyonce Hamada," and the like as candidates for her pen name.

In 2006, she debuted at Big Comic Spirits Casual in Hyper Tantei Rinka. The style of her work was evaluated, and she got hired as an assistant to Hanayo Hanatsu.

In July 2007, Big Comic Spirits began serialising Pagyaru!, depicting the ecology of gyaru in Shibuya using gyaru words. After that, "Britney's life counselings," was added, which answers reader's questions in dialogue form with her editor-in-charge.

In March 2008, Harada held talks with Fujiko Fujio A and Tetsuya Chiba at Big Comic Spirits No. 18 and participated in the gravure page of the model Tsubasa Masuwaka.

== Personal life ==
As a "homeless gyaru manga artist", she lived a life to live in manga cafes or karaoke boxes without a permanent place to say. She said that she had paid a pension. She ended her "homeless life" at the end of 2009 and lived in a Tokyo condominium with a six-tatami room and a Loft store. Hamada and her editor meet exclusively at a karaoke box in Shibuya.

Her father was very tough and hit Hamada if she dyed her hair, and threw out her hair dye. Her parents found out that she became a manga artist for the first time only when seeing her works sold. Although she stayed unhappy with her father after she ran away from home, he saved clippings of the magazines she was in. Her relationship with her parents improved, and she gave them a car and her mother a smartphone.

On 25 October 2010, on her former official website, she quit Ever Green Entertainment, to which she belonged since December 2008, and announced that she was devoting herself to manga. She later launched Piece Eight Co., Ltd., a private company. On 2 November 2010, she closed her former official website and blog, opening a new official website and blog the next day. On 1 October 2011, Harada announced that she would continue her entertainment activities on her own blog.

She announced her engagement in December 2013, but broke it off in June 2014. In February 2018 she announced that her actual age was 38, and that she was pregnant with her first child, making a decision to give birth as a single mother.

She's also knowledgeable about video games, and her 2018 game specialty book has a review of the kusoge genre. That book cites Ganbare Goemon: Kuru Nara Koi! Ayashige Ikka no Kuroi Kage as her personal PlayStation kusoge ranking first place.

== Reception ==
Mimi Usagino of Techinsight Japan's editorial department says that Hamada's bold style of drawing the ecology of contemporary young women resembles Yutsuko Chusonji's work. There are flashy clothes and makeup from Ado Mizumori, so it is said that Hamada's characters will not feel new. In addition, Usagino says that Hamada is expressing her body with messages such as, "there is no house in such a dark era, there are young people who are enjoying living happily." Her entertainment profile as a celebrity is cheerful, flashy and slightly obaka but bright. characters who are called "Manga+Tarento", on the other hand, have many rivals.

== Works ==
Manga

- Pagyaru (Big Comic Spirits, 2007–09)
- Britney Hamada no Manga de Wakaru Moe Business (Monthly Sunday Gene-X, 2010–)
- Center Machi no Mary e (Monthly Big Comic Spirits, 2010–11)
- PatoKen+ (Manga Pachinkā Original, 2011–12)

CD

- Pagyaru! Trance Produced by Britney Hamada (15 Oct 2008) produce

DVD

- Maji Yabassu!! (23 Apr 2010)

== Appearances ==
=== Internet ===
- Britney Hamada no Panee! CH (@TV-Akihabara (A!ttōdoroku Hōsōkyoku), Jul 2011 – Dec 2012)
- Buri to Sawa no Dai Bōken (Niconico Namahōsō Piece Channel, Jan 2013 –; Mondays 17:00–18:00)

=== Radio ===
- Britney Hamada no Onna no Hikidashi (NBS, 21 Jan – Mar 2013; Mon–Thu: 21:45:30–21:50)

=== TV ===
- IQ Sapuri (CX, 10 May 2008)
- Ariehen Sekai (TX, 10 Jun 2008)
- FNN Super News (CX, 28 Jul 2008) feature
- Quiz Present Variety Q-sama! (EX, 25 Aug 2008, 15 Jun 2009)
- Wide! Scramble (EX, 22 Dec 2008) feature
- Shin Domoto Kyōdai (CX, 8 Feb 2009)
- Waratte Iitomo! (CX, 12 Feb, 30 Jun 2009, 9 Mar 2010)
- Hikari Ota's If I Were Prime Minister... Secretary Tanaka (NTV) quasi-regular
- News Japan (CX, 19 Mar 2009) Appeared in "Manga de Kiru Asou Gekijō."
- Otona no Gakuryoku Kentei Special Shōgakkō Kyōkasho Quiz! (NTV, 22 Mar 2009) 29th out of 30 people
- Zettai Shitte okitai 20-ri (NTV, 2 Apr 2009)
- Atashinchi no Danshi (CX, Apr–Jun 2009) as Britney
- Masahiro Nakai no Kin'ōbi no Suma-tachi e (TBS, 15 May 2009)
- run for money Tōsō-chū (CX, 2 Jul 2009)
- Sunday Japon (TBS) quasi-regular
- Down Town DX (YTV-produced, NTV, 16 Jul, 24 Sep 2009)
- SMAP×SMAP (CX, 20 Jul, 21 Sep 2009) Confronted Shingo Katori with illustrations.
- Saturday Value Fever "Versus Club" (NTV, 8 Aug 2009)
- London Hearts (EX, 25 Aug 2009) Appeared in a summer sports test.
- Mecha-Mecha Iketeru! (CX, 29 Aug 2009) Appearance as a consultant in the corner "Sachiko no Shinshitsu."
- Kirei ni naru Bus Tour! –Wakeari Geinōjin no Beauty Keikaku– (KTV-produced, CX, 27 Sep 2009)
- Take Me Out Special (TBS, 29 Sep 2009)
- All-Star Thanksgiving 09 Summer (TBS, 3 Oct 2009)
- Goddotan (TX, 14 Oct 2010) Appeared in "Ōgoe Quiz."
- Jichael Mackson (MBS, 11 Nov 2009, 19 May 2010) Appeared in "Jaikel Talk Matsuri."
- Lion no Gokigen yō (CX, 20, 24, 25 Nov 2009)
- Bōken Tutorial (KTV, 30 Nov 2009)
- Kanjani8 no Janiben (KTV, 1 Dec 2009)
- The Arashi Secret TV Show (TBS, 10 Dec 2009, 17 Jun 2010)
- Yohane no Senrei (TBS, 19 Jan 2010)
- Masahiro Nakai no Sekai wa Sugee! Koko made Shirabemashita SP (CX, 2 Mar 2010)
- All-Star Thanksgiving 2010 (TBS, 3 Apr 2010)
- Konya Kettei! Soko made yaru ka Man!! Sekai Saikyō no Yūsha-tachi (NTV, 5 Apr 2010)
- Aitoikari no Gekihaku SP: Konna Otoko Yame chaina Kuzumen Bokumetsu Iinkai! (TBS, 13 Apr 2010)
- Minna de Nihon Go! (NHK G, 22 Apr 2010)
- Nandemo Jikkyō Show (TX, 27 Apr 2010)
- Hamachanga (YTV, 29 Apr 2010, NTV, 28 Apr)
- Piramekino G (TX, 30 Apr, 7 May 2010)
- Unchiku Shirisugi (NTV, 14 May 2010)
- Konya mo Doru Bako!! EX (TX, 22 Jun 2010)
- Okubo×Torii×Britney 3P (Tokyo MX, 3 Jul – 25 Sep 2010)*First hosting show
- Akiba 18 Entame TV (A!ttōdoroku Hōsōkyoku, 6 Jul 2011 –)
- SataNepu Best Ten: Jidai o Irodotta Geinōjin no Max Gesshū Dai Kōkai SP (TBS, 15 Oct 2010)
- NMB48 Ririka Suto no Mājan Gachi Battle! (TBS Channel 1, 19 Sep 2015)

=== Films ===
- Shinjuku Midnight Baby (Scheduled to be released in 2015) – as Remi Yuki

=== Music videos ===
- Club Prince "Shan Panda!!"

=== Others ===
- World Cosplay Summit 2009 (3 Aug 2009) – Appeared as a judge of the World Cosplay Championship
