= Spellcaster =

Spellcaster may refer to:

- Spellcaster, a person who casts a spell (incantation)
- Magician (fantasy), or spellcaster, a character who practices magic
- Spellcaster (film), a 1992 American film
- SpellCaster (video game), a 1988 video game
