= Disu × Komi =

Japanese manga series by Masami Yuki

- First tankōbon volume cover

でぃす×こみ
- Genre: Comedy
- Manga
- Written by: Masami Yuki
- Published by: Shogakukan
- Magazine: Monthly Big Comic Spirits
- Original run: April 27, 2013 – October 27, 2017
- Volumes: 3
- icon

Disu × Komi (でぃす×こみ; "Communication Failure"), also known as Discommunication, is a Japanese manga series written and illustrated by Masami Yuki. It was serialized in Shogakukan's seinen manga magazine Monthly Big Comic Spirits from April 2013 to October 2017.

== Publication ==
Written and illustrated by Masami Yuki, Disu × Komi debuted in Shogakukan's seinen manga magazine Monthly Big Comic Spirits on April 27, 2013. The manga was irregularly serialized in the magazine. It finished on October 27, 2017. Shogakukan collected its chapters in three tankōbon volumes, released from January 9, 2015, to January 12, 2018.

=== Volumes ===
No.	Japanese release date	Japanese ISBN
1	January 9, 2015	978-4-09-186720-9
2	January 30, 2017	978-4-09-189438-0
3	January 12, 2018	978-4-09-189776-3
