= Mikazuki no Dragon =

Japanese manga series

- First tankōbon volume cover

三日月のドラゴン (Mikazuki no Doragon)
- Genre: Martial arts
- Manga
- Written by: Kenichiro Nagao
- Published by: Shogakukan
- Magazine: Monthly Big Comic Spirits
- Original run: January 26, 2019 – August 26, 2022
- Volumes: 7
- icon

Mikazuki no Dragon (三日月のドラゴン, Mikazuki no Doragon; "Dragon Under the Crescent Moon") is a Japanese manga series written and illustrated by Kenichiro Nagao. It was serialized in Shogakukan's seinen manga magazine Monthly Big Comic Spirits between January 2019 and August 2022, with its chapters collected in seven tankōbon volumes.

== Publication ==
Written and illustrated by Kenichiro Nagao, Mikazuki no Dragon started in Shogakukan's seinen manga magazine Monthly Big Comic Spirits on January 26, 2019, and ended on August 26, 2022. Shogakukan collected its chapters in seven tankōbon volumes, released from September 30, 2019, to September 30, 2022.

=== Volumes ===
No.	Japanese release date	Japanese ISBN
1	September 30, 2019	978-4-09-860358-9
2	February 28, 2020	978-4-09-860549-1
3	July 30, 2020	978-4-09-860681-8
4	December 25, 2020	978-4-09-860788-4
5	May 28, 2021	978-4-09-861051-8
6	December 28, 2021	978-4-09-861208-6
7	September 30, 2022	978-4-09-861411-0
