= Shingun no Cadet =

Japanese manga series

- First tankōbon volume cover

神軍のカデット (Shingun no Kadetto)
- Genre: Dark fantasy; Military
- Manga
- Written by: Arata Kawabata
- Published by: Shogakukan
- Imprint: Big Spirits Comics
- Magazine: Monthly Big Comic Spirits
- Original run: January 27, 2016 – October 27, 2017
- Volumes: 4

Shingun no Cadet (Japanese: 神軍のカデット, Hepburn: Shingun no Kadetto; "Cadet In the Divine Army") is a Japanese manga series written and illustrated by Arata Kawabata. It was serialized in Shogakukan's seinen manga magazine Monthly Big Comic Spirits from January 2016 to October 2017, with its chapters collected in four tankōbon volumes.

== Publication ==
Written and illustrated by Arata Kawabata, Shingun no Cadet was serialized in Shogakukan's seinen manga magazine Monthly Big Comic Spirits from January 27, 2016, to October 27, 2017. Shogakukan collected its chapters in four tankōbon volumes, released from January 27, 2016, to December 12, 2017.

=== Volumes ===
No.	Japanese release date	Japanese ISBN
1	August 12, 2016	978-4-09-187665-2
2	February 10, 2017	978-4-09-189358-1
3	June 12, 2017	978-4-09-189528-8
4	December 12, 2017	978-4-09-189698-8

== See also ==
- Do You Like the Nerdy Nurse?, another manga series by the same author
