= Taberu Dake =

Japanese manga series

- First tankōbon volume cover

たべるダケ
- Genre: Gourmet; Supernatural
- Manga
- Written by: Sanko Takada
- Published by: Shogakukan
- Magazine: Monthly Big Comic Spirits
- Original run: December 27, 2010 – November 27, 2013
- Volumes: 4
- Television drama
- Directed by: Kyohei Fujimura
- Written by: Ayako Kitagawa; Raion Hitoshizuku
- Music by: Michiru
- Original network: TV Tokyo
- Original run: July 13, 2013 – September 28, 2013
- Episodes: 12
- icon

Taberu Dake (たべるダケ; lit. 'Just Eating') is a Japanese manga series written and illustrated by Sanko Takada. It was serialized in Shogakukan's seinen manga magazine Monthly Big Comic Spirits from December 2010 to November 2013.

== Media ==
=== Manga ===
Written and illustrated by Sanko Takada, Taberu Dake was serialized in Shogakukan's seinen manga magazine Monthly Big Comic Spirits from December 27, 2010, to November 27, 2013. Shogakukan collected its chapters in four tankōbon volumes, released from November 30, 2011, to January 30, 2014.

==== Volumes ====
No.	Japanese release date	Japanese ISBN
1	November 30, 2011	978-4-09-184218-3
2	May 30, 2012	978-4-09-184549-8
3	June 28, 2013	978-4-09-185340-0
4	January 30, 2014	978-4-09-186084-2

=== Drama ===
A 12-episode television drama adaptation, starring Mariko Gotō as the unnamed protagonist known as Shizuru, was broadcast on TV Tokyo from July 13 to September 28, 2013. (Note: TV Tokyo listed the air dates for the series on Friday at 24:52, which is effectively Saturday at 00:52 a.m. JST.) Sakanamon performed the series' opening theme "Hanairo no Bishōjo" (花色の美少女; "Flower-colored Beautiful Girl"), while Mariko Gotō performed the ending theme "Sound of Me".
