= Para Para Days =

Japanese manga series

- First tankōbon volume cover

パラパラデイズ (Para Para Deizu)
- Genre: Romantic comedy
- Manga
- Written by: Yumi Unita
- Published by: Shogakukan
- Magazine: Monthly Big Comic Spirits
- Original run: October 27, 2014 – February 26, 2021
- Volumes: 3
- icon

Para Para Days (Japanese: パラパラデイズ, Hepburn: Para Para Deizu; "Riffling Days") is a Japanese manga series written and illustrated by Yumi Unita. It was serialized in Shogakukan's seinen manga magazine Monthly Big Comic Spirits from October 2014 to February 2021.

== Publication ==
Written and illustrated by Yumi Unita, Para Para Days was serialized in Shogakukan's seinen manga magazine Monthly Big Comic Spirits from October 27, 2014, to February 26, 2021. Shogakukan collected its chapters in three tankōbon volumes, released from May 12, 2017, to June 11, 2021.

=== Volumes ===
No.	Japanese release date	Japanese ISBN
1	May 12, 2017	978-4-09-189504-2
2	June 12, 2019	978-4-09-860313-8
3	June 11, 2021	978-4-09-861058-7
