= Aomiyuku Yuki =

Japanese manga series

- First tankōbon volume cover

青みゆく雪
- Genre: Romance
- Manga
- Written by: Yumi Unita
- Published by: Shogakukan
- Imprint: Big Spirits Comics
- Magazine: Monthly Big Comic Spirits
- Original run: August 27, 2009 – January 27, 2014
- Volumes: 2
- icon

Aomiyuku Yuki (青みゆく雪; "Snow Turning Blue") is a Japanese manga series written and illustrated by Yumi Unita. It was serialized in Shogakukan's seinen manga magazine Monthly Big Comic Spirits from August 2009 to January 2014, with its chapters collected in two tankōbon volumes.

== Plot ==
Sei, a Chinese university student studying abroad in Japan, lives in a student apartment building near his college. Among the residents is Yukiko, a Japanese student with whom Sei becomes close and gradually develops romantic feelings for. Although the two spend time together and appear to grow closer, Sei struggles to interpret Yukiko's intentions due to differences in language and cultural expectations. As their relationship develops, small misunderstandings and miscommunications repeatedly create awkward situations between them, often causing Sei to worry that he has upset her.

== Publication ==
Written and illustrated by Yumi Unita, Aomiyuku Yuki was serialized in Shogakukan's seinen manga magazine Monthly Big Comic Spirits from August 27, 2009, to January 27, 2014. Shogakukan collected its chapters in two tankōbon volumes, released on September 30, 2011, and April 30, 2014.

=== Volumes ===
No.	Japanese release date	Japanese ISBN
1	September 30, 2011	978-4-09-184067-7
2	April 30, 2014	978-4-09-186165-8
