= Room 999 =

Japanese manga series

- First tankōbon volume cover

999号室 (999-Gōshitsu)
- Genre: Science fiction
- Manga
- Written by: Nanga Nan
- Published by: Shogakukan
- Imprint: Big Spirits Comics
- Magazine: Monthly Big Comic Spirits
- Original run: November 27, 2025 – present
- Volumes: 1

Room 999 (Japanese: 999号室, Hepburn: 999-Gōshitsu) is a Japanese manga series written and illustrated by Nanga Nan. It has been serialized in Shogakukan's seinen manga magazine Monthly Big Comic Spirits since November 2025. As of May 2026, one volume has been released.

== Plot ==
The story takes place in an apartment complex inhabited by unusual creatures who constantly work to better the nation. In the complex, Courier No. 1871 navigates the maze-like corridors to deliver letters to the inhabitants.

== Production ==
In October 2024, Nan's editor offered to allow them to serialize a full series, which is when Nan came up with the story. In writing the story, Nan wanted to include different themes in the form of unique characters, believing that writing only one theme would be boring. Nan felt that an apartment complex would be the best setting to match that concept. For the protagonist, Nan thought that a postman would be best suited, since they would have to meet different characters to deliver letters. Nan also wanted to keep the protagonist unremarkable to prevent him from overshadowing the side characters. His dog, Toto, is based on Nan's family's dog. Completing the illustrations for the first chapter took about four months. Nan cited Naoki Urasawa and Inio Asano as inspiration for his illustrations and Kowloon Walled City and the plans for Neom as inspiration for the setting.

== Publication ==
Written and illustrated by Nanga Nan, the series began serialization in Shogakukan's seinen manga magazine Monthly Big Comic Spirits on November 27, 2025. As of May 2026, the series' individual chapters have been collected into a single tankōbon volume.

=== Volumes ===
No.	Release date	ISBN
1	May 12, 2026	978-4-09-864005-8

== Reception ==
The first volume gained significant attention on social media, especially after actor Kazunari Ninomiya recommended it. The first print run of the volume immediately sold out in many stores, with copies being resold online at higher prices. The issue of Weekly Big Comic Spirits where 999-Gōshitsu began its serialization was resold for ¥150,000. The first volume went through three print runs in its first month, with 79,999 copies in circulation between its print and digital editions. This has been described as "unprecedented" for a new author's first series. The first volume was also recommended by manga artists Naoki Urasawa, Inio Asano, and Sumito Ōwara.

Comic Natalie's editors liked the premise of delivering letters to monsters. In particular, they felt that the depictions of monsters' emotions upon reading their letters was humanizing and emotional. A columnist for Rocket News24 liked that the illustrations, particularly the backgrounds, which they described as "absolutely amazing". They also compared the world-building to Blame! by Tsutomu Nihei.

The series was nominated for the twelfth Next Manga Award in 2026 in the print category.
