= Monthly Big Comic Spirits =

Japanese manga magazine

- Cover of the magazine's first issue (cover dated October 2009), featuring Hana to Oku-tan
- Editor: Yoshitake Tachikawa
- Categories: Seinen manga
- Frequency: Monthly
- Circulation: 2,500; (July–September 2026)
- First issue: August 27, 2009
- Company: Shogakukan
- Country: Japan
- Based in: Tokyo
- Language: Japanese
- Website: Official website

Monthly Big Comic Spirits (Japanese: 月刊! スピリッツ, Hepburn: Gekkan! Supirittsu; lit. 'Monthly! Spirits') is a Japanese monthly seinen manga magazine published by Shogakukan. It originally launched on August 27, 2009. It is a companion magazine to the weekly Big Comic Spirits.

== Series ==
=== Current ===
There are currently 15 manga series being serialized in Monthly Big Comic Spirits.

Title	Author	Premiered
Ansatsu Kōkyū: Ansatsu Jokan Karin wa Yuttari Ikitai (暗殺後宮〜暗殺女官・花鈴はゆったり生きたい〜)	Tabasa Iori	August 2021
Azuma-kun no Koi Neko (東くんの恋猫)	Ryokin Sugawara	July 2022
Combat Mecha Xabungle: Another Gale (戦闘メカ ザブングル アナザー・ゲイル, Sentō Meka Zabunguru Anazā Geiru)	Tanaka Muneyoshi; Yoshiyuki Tomino (original); Yoshitake Suzuki (original)	September 2022
Dokudokudoku (ドクドクドク)	Masaya Tsugami (story); Eishin Watanabe (art)	December 2022
En mo Yukari mo (縁もゆかりも)	Yumi Unita	April 2022
Gamers × Dungeon: Boku wa Game Izon Janai (ゲーマーズ×ダンジョン 僕はゲーム依存じゃない, Gēmāzu × Danjon Boku wa Gēmu Izon Janai)	Eri Nanato, Satoshi Kameyama	May 2022
Hen na Mono Mikke! (へんなものみっけ)	Tomo Sawara	September 2016
Inu to Sandbag (犬とサンドバッグ, Inu to Sandobaggu)	Kaori Ozaki	May 2022
Jibun o Suki ni Naritai kara Seikei suru Hanashi (自分を好きになりたいから整形する話)	Popopo	January 2023
Keep Your Hands Off Eizouken! (映像研には手を出すな！, Eizouken ni wa Te o Dasu na!)	Sumito Ōwara	July 2016
Naori wa Shinai ga, Mashi ni Naru (なおりはしないが、ましになる)	Kaoru Curry zawa	November 2019
Planet Girl (プラネットガール, Puranetto Gāru)	Oishi Hibi	May 2019
Room 999 (999号室, 999-Gōshitsu)	Nanga Nan	November 2025
Snowball Earth (スノウボールアース, Sunōbōru Āsu)	Yuhiro Tsujitsugu	January 2021
Sukaraiti (スカライティ)	You Hivi	March 2022

=== Finished ===
==== 2009 ====
- Aomiyuku Yuki (青みゆく雪) by Yumi Unita (August 2009 – January 2014)
- D no Maō (Dの魔王) by Kayoko Shimotsuki (August 2009 – May 2010) (transferred from Weekly Big Comic Spirits)
- Kodai Roma Kakutō Angokutan Sin (古代ローマ格闘暗獄譚 SIN) by Hideo Shinaogawa (August 2009 – September 2011)
- Kyō no Asuka Show (今日のあすかショー) by Taishi Mori (August 2009 – July 2013)
- Mill (ミル, Miru) by Kazunori Tahara (August 2009 – July 2013)
- Mono Monojima (ものものじま) by Munehiro Nomura (August 2009 – December 2011)
- Pipedon (ピペドン) by Jun Hanyunyu (August 2009 – January 2011)
- Shin Dainama Itō! (新ダイナマ伊藤！) by Pero Sugimoto (August 2009 – November 2010)
- Sonna Dakara Omaera wa (そんなんだからおまえらは。) by Riichi Kasai (August 2009 – October 2010)
- Yodogawa Belt Conveyor Girl (淀川ベルトコンベア・ガール) by Katsura Murakami (August 2009 – July 2011)
- 8 Hachi (8 はち) by Yūji Takemoto (September 2009 – September 2013)
- Moriyamachū Kyoushūjo (森山中教習所) by Keigo Shinzou (September 2009 – July 2010)
- Salad Bo: Salad Bowl Diary (サラダぼ。～SALAD BOWL Diary～) by Masaki Satō (September 2009 – January 2011)
- Fuwari! (ふわり！) by Natsuo Motomachi (November 2009 – September 2010)
- Ushiharu (ウシハル) by Yukiko Gotō (November 2009 – June 2010) (transferred to Weekly Big Comic Spirits; another chapter was published in MBCS in September 2010)

==== 2010 – 2014 ====
- Hanamote Katare (花もて語れ) by Yukiwo Katayama and Momoji Higashi (cooperation) (January 2010 – December 2011) (transferred to Weekly Big Comic Spirits)
- Shin Tōbou Bengoshi Narita Makoto (新・逃亡弁護士 成田誠) by Takeshi Natsuhara (story; as Hideki Gō) and Yū Takada (art) (April 2010 – December 2011)
- Dragon Jam by Itsunari Fuji (May 2010 – January 2011) (transferred to Weekly Big Comic Spirits)
- Nora Inu 9-chan (ノラ犬9ちゃん), later retitled as Center Gai no Mary (センター街のマリーへ, Sentā-gai no Marīe), by Britney Hamada (July 2010 – December 2011)
- Shut Hell (シュトヘル, Shuto Heru) by Yu Itō (July 2010 – March 2017)
- Ippiki to Kyūjū Kyūhikito (一匹と九十九匹と) by Shun Umezawa (October 2010 – February 2012)
- Misaki, Number 1!! (美咲ナンバーワン!!, Misaki Nanbā Wan!!) by Masato Fujisaki (October 2010 – January 2011) (transferred from Weekly Big Comic Spirits)
- Taberu Dake (たべるダケ) by Sanko Takada (December 2010 – November 2013)
- Shichigatsu no Hone (七月の骨) by Satoshi Yoshida (February 2011 – March 2013) (transferred from Weekly Big Comic Spirits)
- Kyōgaku Kōkou no Genjitsu (共学高校のゲンジツ) by Yū Sanui (story) and Sumihito Itami (art) (January 2012 – June 2017)
- Kujaku Ō: Rising (孔雀王 ライジング) by Makoto Ogino (March 2012 – July 2019)
- Jūhan Shuttai! (重版出来) by Naoko Matsuda (September 2012 – June 2023)
- Disu × Komi (でぃす×こみ) by Masami Yuki (April 2013 – October 2017)
- Santiago: Rebellion Shimabara (SANTIAGO―レベリオン・シマバラ―, Sanchago Reberion Shimabara) by Masaki Enjoji (January 2014 – October 2015)
- Tasogare Memorandum (たそがれメモランダム, Tasogare Memorandamu) by Akane Tamura (April 2014 – June 2015)
- A-un (阿・吽) by Mari Okazaki (May 2014 – May 2021)
- After the Rain (恋は雨上がりのように, Koi wa Ameagari no Yō ni) by Jun Mayuzuki (June 2014 – November 2015) (transferred to Weekly Big Comic Spirits)
- Oyasumi Karasu, Mata Kite ne (おやすみカラスまた来てね) by Ryo Ikuemi (August 2014 – April 2022)
- Para Para Days (パラパラデイズ, Para Para Deizu) by Yumi Unita (October 2014 – February 2021)
- Hengoku no Schwester (辺獄のシュヴェスタ, Hengoku no Shuvesuta) by Minoru Takeyoshi (December 2014 – October 2017)

==== 2015 – 2019 ====
- Sunny by Taiyō Matsumoto (January – July 2015) (transferred from Monthly Ikki)
- Tokyo Alien Bros. (トーキョーエイリアンブラザーズ, Tōkyō Eirian Burazāzu) by Keigo Shinzō (June 2015 – January 2017)
- Ageku no Hate no Kanon (あげくの果てのカノン) by Kyo Yoneshiro (August 2015 – February 2018)
- Shingun no Cadet (神軍のカデット, Shingun no Kadetto) by Arata Kawabata (January 2016 – October 2017)
- Kimajime-hime to Bunbōgu-ōji (きまじめ姫と文房具王子) by Aako Fujiwara (March 2017 – November 2020)
- Shinkurō, Hashiru! (新九郎、奔る！) by Masami Yuki (January 2018 – October 2019) (transferred to Weekly Big Comic Spirits)
- Misoji Meshi Niku (三十路飯 肉) by Shizuka Itō (May 2018 – June 2019)
- Vivre Yōsai-ten: Kinuyo to Harriet (ヴィーヴル洋裁店〜キヌヨとハリエット〜, Vīvuru Yōsai-ten Kinuyo to Harietto) by Takashi Wada (December 2018 – August 2020)
- Dekaniarazu (デカニアラズ) by Kenji Hayakawa (March 2019 – April 2021)
- Mikazuki no Dragon (三日月のドラゴン) by Kenichiro Nagao (January 2019 – August 2022)
- Kokoro no Nurse Yano-san (こころのナース夜野さん) by Midori Mizutani (June 2019 – September 2022)

==== 2020 – present ====
- Eiichi: Shibusawa Eiichi (栄一 ～渋沢栄一伝～) by Midori Machida (June 2020 – December 2021)
- I'm Not Meat: Get Your Filthy Paws Off Me! (僕はお肉じゃない, Boku wa Oniku Janai) by Ikkado Ito (July 2020 – September 2021)
- Kojiki (Chūkara) (古事記 (中辛)) by Ukitsu (August 2020 – July 2022)
- Shohōsen-jō no Aria (処方箋上のアリア) by Erika Miura (August 2020 – August 2022)
- Kuru Kuru Kuruma Mimura Pan (くるくるくるまミムラパン) by Aoi Sekino (December 2020 – August 2022)December 2020
- Yasuke by Satoshi Okunishi (July 2021 – July 2022)
- Ai Suru Anata to Koi Suru Kimi ga (愛するあなたと恋するきみが) by Mashimi Mori (August 2021 – September 2022)
- Iberis no Hanayome (イベリスの花嫁, Iberisu no Hanayome) by Haru Akiyama (December 2021 – December 2022)
