= The Long Summer of August 31st =

Japanese manga series

- First tankōbon volume cover

8月31日のロングサマー (Hachigatsu Sanjuuichi no Rongusamā)
- Genre: Coming of age; Romantic comedy; Science fantasy
- Manga
- Written by: Ikkado Ito
- Published by: Kodansha
- English publisher: NA: Seven Seas Entertainment
- Imprint: Morning KC
- Magazine: Morning
- Original run: March 30, 2023 – present
- Volumes: 13
- Television drama
- Anime television series
- Studio: Shaft
- icon

The Long Summer of August 31st (Japanese: 8月31日のロングサマー, Hepburn: Hachigatsu Sanjuuichi no Rongusamā) is a Japanese manga series written and illustrated by Ikkado Ito. It began serialization in Kodansha's seinen manga magazine Morning in March 2023. A television drama adaptation and an anime television series adaptation produced by Shaft have been announced.

== Synopsis ==
Takaya Suzuki and Kana Takagi are high schoolers who have been caught in an unending time loop centered around the date August 31st for a month. Suzuki begins to suggest that a possible reason for this could be linked to Suzuki's desire to get a girlfriend and lose his virginity.

== Media ==
=== Manga ===
Written and illustrated by Ikkado Ito, The Long Summer of August 31st began serialization in Kodansha's seinen manga magazine Morning on March 30, 2023. Its chapters have been compiled into thirteen tankōbon volumes as of August 2026.

The series is published in English on Kodansha's K Manga app. The series is also licensed for English publication by Seven Seas Entertainment.

==== Volumes ====
No.	Original release date	Original ISBN	North American release date	North American ISBN
1	August 23, 2023	978-4-06-532668-8	April 1, 2025	979-8-89373-174-3
1. "August 31st on Loop" (ループする8月31日, Rūpu suru Hachigatsu Sanjūichinich); 2. "Ordering a Parfait on August 31st" (パフェを頼む8月31日, Pafe o Tanomu Hachigatsu Sanjūichinichi); 3. "LINE Messages on August 31st" (LINEする8月31日, LINE Sūru Hachigatsu Sanjūichinichi); 4. "At the Pool on August 31st" (プールする8月31日, Pūru suru Hachigatsu Sanjūichinichi); 5. "Invited Out on August 31st" (かよばれする8月31日, Kajobare suru Hachigatsu Sanjūichinichi); 6. "Out of Control on August 31st" (暴走する8月31日, Bōsō suru Hachigatsu Sanjūichinichi); 7. "Running like the Wind on August 31st" (疾走する8月31日, Shissō suru Hachigatsu Sanjūichinichi); 8. "Devised a Plan on August 31st" (計画する8月31日, Keikaku suru Hachigatsu Sanjūichinichi)
2	November 22, 2023	978-4-06-533664-9	July 8, 2025	979-8-89373-175-0
9. "Being Fashionable on August 31st" (おしゃれな8月31日, Oshare na Hachigatsu Sanjūichinichi); 10. "Planning for the Future on August 31st" (進路する8月31日, Shinro suru Hachigatsu Sanjūichinichi); 11. "Back to the August 31st Part 1" (バック・トゥ・ザ・8月31日 PART I, Bakku tu za Hachigatsu Sanjūichinichi PART I); 12. "Back to the August 31st Part 2" (バック・トゥ・ザ・8月31日 PART II, Bakku tu za Hachigatsu Sanjūichinichi PART II); 13. "Back to the August 31st Part 3" (バック・トゥ・ザ・8月31日 PART III, Bakku tu za Hachigatsu Sanjūichinichi PART III); 14. "Practicing on August 31st" (練習する8月31日, Renshū suru Hachigatsu Sanjūichinichi); 15. "Karaoke on August 31st" (カラオケする8月31日, Karaoke suru Hachigatsu Sanjūichinichi); 16. "August 31st Will Always Come Part 1" (きっとくる8月31日その壱, Kitto Kuru Hachigatsu Sanjūichinichi Sono Ichi)
3	February 22, 2024	978-4-06-534649-5	November 4, 2025	979-8-89373-540-6
17. "August 31st Will Always Come Part 2" (きっとくる8月31日 その弐, Kitto Kuru Hachigatsu Sanjūichinichi Sono Ni); 18. "August 31st Will Always Come Part 3" (きっとくる8月31日 その参, Kitto Kuru Hachigatsu Sanjūichinichi Sono San); 19. "Coed on August 31st" (共学する8月31日, Kyōgaku suru Hachigatsu Sanjūichinichi); 20. "The Final Battle on August 31st Part 1" (決戦は8月31日 PART 1, Kessen wa Hachigatsu Sanjūichinichi PART 1); 21. "The Final Battle on August 31st Part 2" (決戦は8月31日 PART 2, Kessen wa Hachigatsu Sanjūichinichi PART 2); 22. "The Final Battle on August 31st Part 3" (決戦は8月31日 PART 3, Kessen wa Hachigatsu Sanjūichinichi PART 3); 23. "The Final Battle on August 31st Part 4" (決戦は8月31日 PART 4, Kessen wa Hachigatsu Sanjūichinichi PART 4); 24. "Going on a Trip on August 31st Part 1" (旅行する8月31日 PART 1, Ryokō suru Hachigatsu Sanjūichinichi PART 1)
4	May 22, 2024	978-4-06-535579-4	February 3, 2026	979-8-89373-768-4
25. "Going on a Trip on August 31st Part 2" (旅行する8月31日 PART 2, Ryokō suru Hachigatsu Sanjūichinichi PART 2); 26. "Going on a Trip on August 31st Part 3" (旅行する8月31日 PART 3, Ryokō suru Hachigatsu Sanjūichinichi PART 3); 27. "Going on a Trip on August 31st Part 4" (旅行する8月31日 PART 4, Ryokō suru Hachigatsu Sanjūichinichi PART 4); 28. "Going on a Trip on August 31st Part 5" (旅行する8月31日 PART 5, Ryokō suru Hachigatsu Sanjūichinichi PART 5); 29. "Going on a Trip on August 31st Part 6" (旅行する8月31日 PART 6, Ryokō suru Hachigatsu Sanjūichinichi PART 6); 30. "Going on a Trip on August 31st Part 7" (旅行する8月31日 PART 7, Ryokō suru Hachigatsu Sanjūichinichi PART 7); 31. "Going on a Trip on August 31st Part 8" (旅行する8月31日 PART 8, Ryokō suru Hachigatsu Sanjūichinichi PART 8); 32. "Going on a Trip on August 31st Part 9" (旅行する8月31日 PART 9, Ryokō suru Hachigatsu Sanjūichinichi PART 9); 33. "An August 31st Without You" (君がいない8月31日, Kimi ga Inai Hachigatsu Sanjūichinichi)
5	August 22, 2024	978-4-06-536597-7	May 12, 2026	979-8-89373-965-7
34. "Under the Tree of Legend on August 31st" (伝説の樹の下で8月31日, Densetsu no Ki no Shita de Hachigatsu Sanjūichinichi); 35. "Screams Ring Out on August 31st" (絶叫する8月31日, Zekkyō suru Hachigatsu Sanjūichinichi); 36. "A Sweaty August 31st" (汗をかく8月31日, Ase o Kaku Hachigatsu Sanjūichinichi); 37. "An Important August 31st" (大事な8月31日, Daijina Hachigatsu Sanjūichinichi); 38. "Barbecue on August 31st" (焼肉する8月31日, Yakiniku suru Hachigatsu Sanjūichinichi); 39. "To the Manga Café on August 31st" (漫喫する8月31日, Mankitsu suru Hachigatsu Sanjūichinichi); 40. "A Long Phone Call on August 31st" (長電話する8月31日, Nagadenwa suru Hachigatsu Sanjūichinichi); 41. "That Summer of August 31st Part 1" (あの夏の8月31日 PART 1, Ano natsu no Hachigatsu Sanjūichinichi PART 1)
6	November 21, 2024	978-4-06-537523-5	August 25, 2026	979-8-89561-454-9
42. "That Summer of August 31st Part 2" (あの夏の8月31日 PART 2, Ano natsu no Hachigatsu Sanjūichinichi PART 2); 43. "That Summer of August 31st Part 3" (あの夏の8月31日 PART 3, Ano natsu no Hachigatsu Sanjūichinichi PART 3); 44. "That Summer of August 31st Part 4" (あの夏の8月31日 PART 4, Ano natsu no Hachigatsu Sanjūichinichi PART 4); 45. "That Summer of August 31st Part 5" (あの夏の8月31日 PART 5, Ano natsu no Hachigatsu Sanjūichinichi PART 5); 46. "That Summer of August 31st Part 6" (あの夏の8月31日 PART 6, Ano natsu no Hachigatsu Sanjūichinichi PART 6); 47. "That Summer of August 31st Part 7" (あの夏の8月31日 PART 7, Ano natsu no Hachigatsu Sanjūichinichi PART 7); 48. "That Summer of August 31st Part 8" (あの夏の8月31日 PART 8, Ano natsu no Hachigatsu Sanjūichinichi PART 8); 49. "That Summer of August 31st Part 9" (あの夏の8月31日 PART 9, Ano natsu no Hachigatsu Sanjūichinichi PART 9); 50. "That Summer of August 31st Part 10" (あの夏の8月31日 PART 10, Ano natsu no Hachigatsu Sanjūichinichi PART 10)
7	February 21, 2025	978-4-06-538473-2	November 10, 2026	979-8-89561-983-4
51. "That Summer of August 31st Part 11" (あの夏の8月31日 PART 11, Ano natsu no Hachigatsu Sanjūichinichi PART 11); 52. "That Summer of August 31st Part 12" (あの夏の8月31日 PART 12, Ano natsu no Hachigatsu Sanjūichinichi PART 12); 53. "That Summer of August 31st Part 13" (あの夏の8月31日 PART 13, Ano natsu no Hachigatsu Sanjūichinichi PART 13); 54. "That Summer of August 31st Part 14" (あの夏の8月31日 PART 14, Ano natsu no Hachigatsu Sanjūichinichi PART 14); 55. "That Summer of August 31st Part 15" (あの夏の8月31日 PART 15, Ano natsu no Hachigatsu Sanjūichinichi PART 15); 56. "That Summer of August 31st Part 16" (あの夏の8月31日 PART 16, Ano natsu no Hachigatsu Sanjūichinichi PART 16); 57. "That Summer of August 31st Part 17" (あの夏の8月31日 PART 17, Ano natsu no Hachigatsu Sanjūichinichi PART 17); 58. "That Summer of August 31st Part 18" (あの夏の8月31日 PART 18, Ano natsu no Hachigatsu Sanjūichinichi PART 18)
8	May 22, 2025	978-4-06-539526-4	February 2, 2027	979-8-89765-653-0
59. "That Summer of August 31st Part 19" (あの夏の8月31日 PART 19, Ano natsu no Hachigatsu Sanjūichinichi PART 19); 60. "That Summer of August 31st Part 20" (あの夏の8月31日 PART 20, Ano natsu no Hachigatsu Sanjūichinichi PART 20); 61. "That Summer of August 31st Part 21" (あの夏の8月31日 PART 21, Ano natsu no Hachigatsu Sanjūichinichi PART 21); 62. "That Summer of August 31st Part 22" (あの夏の8月31日 PART 22, Ano natsu no Hachigatsu Sanjūichinichi PART 22); 63. "That Summer of August 31st Part 23" (あの夏の8月31日 PART 23, Ano natsu no Hachigatsu Sanjūichinichi PART 23); 64. "That Summer of August 31st Part 24" (あの夏の8月31日 PART 24, Ano natsu no Hachigatsu Sanjūichinichi PART 24); 65. "That Summer of August 31st Part 25" (あの夏の8月31日 PART 25, Ano natsu no Hachigatsu Sanjūichinichi PART 25); 66. "Consulting on August 31st Part 1" (相談する8月31日 PART 1, Sōdan suru Hachigatsu Sanjūichinichi PART 1)
9	August 22, 2025	978-4-06-540614-4	May 25, 2027	979-8-89863-032-4
67. "Consulting on August 31st Part 2" (相談する8月31日 PART 2, Sōdan suru Hachigatsu Sanjūichinichi PART 2); 68. "Consulting on August 31st Part 3" (相談する8月31日 PART 3, Sōdan suru Hachigatsu Sanjūichinichi PART 3); 69. "Becoming a Family on August 31st Part 1" (家族する8月31日 PART 1, Kazoku suru Hachigatsu Sanjūichinichi PART 1); 70. "Becoming a Family on August 31st Part 2" (家族する8月31日 PART 2, Kazoku suru Hachigatsu Sanjūichinichi PART 2); 71. "Becoming a Family on August 31st Part 3" (家族する8月31日 PART 3, Kazoku suru Hachigatsu Sanjūichinichi PART 3); 72. "Becoming a Family on August 31st Part 4" (家族する8月31日 PART 4, Kazoku suru Hachigatsu Sanjūichinichi PART 4); 73. "Becoming a Family on August 31st Part 5" (家族する8月31日 PART 5, Kazoku suru Hachigatsu Sanjūichinichi PART 5); 74. "Becoming a Family on August 31st Part 6" (家族する8月31日 PART 6, Kazoku suru Hachigatsu Sanjūichinichi PART 6)
10	November 21, 2025	978-4-06-541440-8	—	—
75. "Becoming a Family on August 31st Part 7" (家族する8月31日 PART 7, Kazoku suru Hachigatsu Sanjūichinichi PART 7); 76. "Becoming a Family on August 31st Part 8" (家族する8月31日 PART 8, Kazoku suru Hachigatsu Sanjūichinichi PART 8); 77. "Becoming a Family on August 31st Part 9" (家族する8月31日 PART 9, Kazoku suru Hachigatsu Sanjūichinichi PART 9); 78. "Becoming a Family on August 31st Part 10" (家族する8月31日 PART 10, Kazoku suru Hachigatsu Sanjūichinichi PART 10); 79. "Becoming a Family on August 31st Part 11" (家族する8月31日 PART 11, Kazoku suru Hachigatsu Sanjūichinichi PART 11); 80. "Becoming a Family on August 31st Part 12" (家族する8月31日 PART 12, Kazoku suru Hachigatsu Sanjūichinichi PART 12); 81. "Becoming a Family on August 31st Part 13" (家族する8月31日 PART 13, Kazoku suru Hachigatsu Sanjūichinichi PART 13); 82. "Becoming a Family on August 31st Part 14" (家族する8月31日 PART 14, Kazoku suru Hachigatsu Sanjūichinichi PART 14)
11	February 20, 2026	978-4-06-542536-7	—	—
83. "Becoming a Family on August 31st Part 15" (家族する8月31日 PART 15, Kazoku suru Hachigatsu Sanjūichinichi PART 15); 84. "Becoming a Family on August 31st Part 16" (家族する8月31日 PART 16, Kazoku suru Hachigatsu Sanjūichinichi PART 16); 85. "Becoming a Family on August 31st Part 17" (家族する8月31日 PART 17, Kazoku suru Hachigatsu Sanjūichinichi PART 17); 86. "Becoming a Family on August 31st Part 18" (家族する8月31日 PART 18, Kazoku suru Hachigatsu Sanjūichinichi PART 18); 87. "Becoming a Family on August 31st Part 19" (家族する8月31日 PART 19, Kazoku suru Hachigatsu Sanjūichinichi PART 19); 88. "Becoming a Family on August 31st Part 20" (家族する8月31日 PART 20, Kazoku suru Hachigatsu Sanjūichinichi PART 20); 89. "Becoming a Family on August 31st Part 21" (家族する8月31日 PART 21, Kazoku suru Hachigatsu Sanjūichinichi PART 21); 90. "Becoming a Family on August 31st Part 22" (家族する8月31日 PART 22, Kazoku suru Hachigatsu Sanjūichinichi PART 22)
12	May 22, 2026	978-4-06-543589-2	—	—
91. "Becoming a Family on August 31st Part 23" (家族する8月31日 PART 23, Kazoku suru Hachigatsu Sanjūichinichi PART 23); 92. "Becoming a Family on August 31st Part 24" (家族する8月31日 PART 24, Kazoku suru Hachigatsu Sanjūichinichi PART 24); 93. "Becoming a Family on August 31st Part 25" (家族する8月31日 PART 25, Kazoku suru Hachigatsu Sanjūichinichi PART 25); 94. "Becoming a Family on August 31st Part 26" (家族する8月31日 PART 26, Kazoku suru Hachigatsu Sanjūichinichi PART 26); 95. "Becoming a Family on August 31st Part 27" (家族する8月31日 PART 27, Kazoku suru Hachigatsu Sanjūichinichi PART 27); 96. "Becoming a Family on August 31st Part 28" (家族する8月31日 PART 28, Kazoku suru Hachigatsu Sanjūichinichi PART 28); 97. "Becoming a Family on August 31st Part 29" (家族する8月31日 PART 29, Kazoku suru Hachigatsu Sanjūichinichi PART 29); 98. "Falling in Love on August 31st" (恋をする8月31日, Koi o suru Hachigatsu Sanjūichinichi)
13	August 21, 2026	978-4-06-544731-4	—	—
99. Dōsei suru Hachigatsu Sanjūichinichi PART 1 (同棲する8月31日 PART 1); 100. Dōsei suru Hachigatsu Sanjūichinichi PART 2 (同棲する8月31日 PART 2); 101. Dōsei suru Hachigatsu Sanjūichinichi PART 3 (同棲する8月31日 PART 3); 102. Dōsei suru Hachigatsu Sanjūichinichi PART 4 (同棲する8月31日 PART 4); 103. Dōsei suru Hachigatsu Sanjūichinichi PART 5 (同棲する8月31日 PART 5); 104. Dōsei suru Hachigatsu Sanjūichinichi PART 6 (同棲する8月31日 PART 6); 105. Dōsei suru Hachigatsu Sanjūichinichi PART 7 (同棲する8月31日 PART 7); 106. Dōsei suru Hachigatsu Sanjūichinichi PART 8 (同棲する8月31日 PART 8)

=== Drama ===
A television drama adaptation was announced on August 31, 2026.

=== Anime ===
An anime television series adaptation was also announced on August 31, 2026. The series will be produced by Shaft.

== See also ==
- I'm Not Meat, another manga series by the same creator
