= Kyōgaku Kōkou no Genjitsu =

Japanese manga series

- First tankōbon volume cover

共学高校のゲンジツ
- Genre: Comedy
- Manga
- Written by: Yū Sanui
- Illustrated by: Sumihito Itami
- Published by: Shogakukan
- Imprint: Big Spirits Comics Special
- Magazine: Monthly Big Comic Spirits
- Original run: January 27, 2012 – June 27, 2017
- Volumes: 7
- icon

Kyōgaku Kōkou no Genjitsu (共学高校のゲンジツ; lit. 'The Reality of a Co-ed High School') is a Japanese manga series written by Yū Sanui and illustrated by Sumihito Itami. It was serialized in Shogakukan's seinen manga magazine Monthly Big Comic Spirits from January 2012 to June 2017.

== Publication ==
Written by Yū Sanui and illustrated by Sumihito Itami, Kyōgaku Kōkou no Genjitsu was serialized in Shogakukan's seinen manga magazine Monthly Big Comic Spirits from January 27, 2012, to June 27, 2017. Shogakukan collected its chapters in seven tankōbon volumes, released from September 28, 2012, to December 12, 2017.

=== Volumes ===
No.	Japanese release date	Japanese ISBN
1	September 28, 2012	978-4-09-184705-8
2	June 28, 2013	978-4-09-185337-0
3	January 30, 2014	978-4-09-186070-5
4	September 30, 2014	978-4-09-186508-3
5	August 12, 2015	978-4-09-187258-6
6	April 12, 2017	978-4-09-189475-5
7	December 12, 2017	978-4-09-189671-1
