= Misoji Meshi =

Japanese manga series

- First tankōbon volume cover

三十路飯
- Genre: Gourmet
- Manga
- Written by: Shizuka Itō
- Published by: Shogakukan
- Magazine: Hibana
- Original run: March 6, 2015 – August 7, 2017
- Volumes: 3
- Manga

Misoji Meshi Niku
- Written by: Shizuka Itō
- Published by: Shogakukan
- Magazine: Monthly Big Comic Spirits
- Original run: May 26, 2018 – June 27, 2019
- Volumes: 2
- icon

Misoji Meshi (三十路飯; "Meals At Thirty") is a Japanese manga series written and illustrated by Shizuka Itō. It was serialized in Shogakukan's seinen manga magazine Hibana from March 2015 to August 2017, with its chapters collected in three tankōbon volumes. Another manga, Misoji Meshi Niku, was serialized in Monthly Big Comic Spirits from May 2018 to June 2019, with its chapters collected in two tankōbon volumes.

== Publication ==
Written and illustrated by Shizuka Itō, Misoji Meshi was serialized in Shogakukan seinen manga magazine Hibana from March 6, 2015, to August 7, 2017, when the magazine ceased its publication. Shogakukan collected its chapters in three tankōbon volumes, released from February 12, 2016, to December 12, 2017.

Another series, titled Misoji Meshi Niku (三十路飯 肉; "Meals At Thirty: Meat"), was serialized in Monthly Big Comic Spirits from May 26, 2018, to June 27, 2019. Two volumes were released on December 27, 2018, and July 30, 2019.

=== Misoji Meshi ===
| No. | Japanese release date | Japanese ISBN |
|---|---|---|
| 1 | February 12, 2016 | 978-4-09-187379-8 |
| 2 | February 10, 2017 | 978-4-09-189360-4 |
| 3 | December 12, 2017 | 978-4-09-189766-4 |

=== Misoji Meshi Niku ===
| No. | Japanese release date | Japanese ISBN |
|---|---|---|
| 1 | December 27, 2018 | 978-4-09-860181-3 |
| 2 | July 30, 2019 | 978-4-09-860365-7 |
