= I'm Not Meat =

Japanese manga series

- I'm Not Meat: Get Your Filthy Paws Off Me!
- First tankōbon volume cover

僕はお肉じゃない (Boku wa Oniku Janai)
- Genre: Romantic comedy; Sex comedy
- Manga
- Written by: Ikkado Ito
- Published by: Shogakukan
- English publisher: NA: Seven Seas Entertainment
- Magazine: Monthly Big Comic Spirits
- Original run: July 27, 2020 – September 27, 2021
- Volumes: 3
- icon

I'm Not Meat: Get Your Filthy Paws Off Me! (Japanese: 僕はお肉じゃない, Hepburn: Boku wa Oniku Janai) is a Japanese manga series written and illustrated by Ikkado Ito. It was serialized in Shogakukan's seinen manga magazine Monthly Big Comic Spirits from July 2020 to September 2021, with its chapters collected in three tankōbon volumes.

== Publication ==
Written and illustrated by Ikkado Ito, I'm Not Meat was serialized in Shogakukan's seinen manga magazine Monthly Big Comic Spirits from July 27, 2020, to September 27, 2021. Shogakukan collected its chapters in three tankōbon volumes, released from December 11, 2020, to December 28, 2021.

In October 2021, Seven Seas Entertainment announced that the licensed the manga for English release in North America. It was published under its Ghost Ship imprint starting from June 28, 2022, to May 2, 2023.

=== Volumes ===
No.	Original release date	Original ISBN	English release date	English ISBN
1	December 11, 2020	978-4-09-860780-8	June 28, 2022	978-1-63858-522-0
2	May 12, 2021	978-4-09-861064-8	November 1, 2022	978-1-63858-799-6
3	December 28, 2021	978-4-09-861155-3	May 2, 2023	978-1-68579-539-9

== See also ==
- The Long Summer of August 31st, another manga series by the same creator
