= Phobia (manga) =

Japanese manga series

- First tankōbon volume cover

フォビア
- Genre: Horror
- Manga
- Written by: Katsunori Hara
- Illustrated by: Yukiko Gotō
- Published by: Shogakukan
- Imprint: Big Superior Comics
- Magazine: Big Comic Superior
- Original run: December 25, 2020 – May 10, 2024
- Volumes: 3
- icon

Phobia (Japanese: フォビア, Hepburn: Fobia) is a Japanese manga series written by Katsunori Hara and illustrated by Yukiko Gotō. It has been serialized in Shogakukan's seinen manga magazine Big Comic Superior from December 2020 to May 2024, with its chapters collected in three tankōbon volumes

== Publication ==
Written by Katsunori Hara and illustrated by Yukiko Gotō, Phobia was serialized in Shogakukan's seinen manga magazine Big Comic Superior from December 25, 2020, to May 10, 2024. Shogakukan collected its chapters in three tankōbon volumes, released from September 30, 2021, to May 30, 2024.

=== Volumes ===
| No. | Japanese release date | Japanese ISBN |
|---|---|---|
| 1 | September 30, 2021 | 978-4-09-183479-9 |
| 2 | July 29, 2022 | 978-4-09-861387-8 |
| 3 | May 30, 2024 | 978-4-09-862804-9 |

== See also ==
- Ushiharu, another manga series by Yukiko Gotō
