= Makoto Ogino =

Japanese manga artist (1959–2019)

Makoto Ogino 荻野 真
- Born: May 26, 1959 Gifu Prefecture, Japan
- Died: April 29, 2019 (aged 59)
- Area: Manga artist
- Notable works: Peacock King

Makoto Ogino (Japanese: 荻野 真, Hepburn: Ogino Makoto; May 26, 1959 – April 29, 2019) was a Japanese manga artist. A dropout of Nagoya University, his best-known work is the Peacock King (孔雀王, Kujaku-Oh) manga series.

== Biography ==
Ogino's first manga was Peacock King. It was serialized in Weekly Young Jump from 1986 to 1989, and was published in 17 tankōbon volumes. It follows the adventures of a Buddhist monk who is a member of a secret organization that specializes in demon hunting. The stories involve all sorts of religion and mythology folklore. It was adapted into an OVA series Spirit Warrior and live-action film in 1988. Ogino followed up with Kujaku Ō: Taimaseiden (孔雀王 退魔聖伝) which ran Young Jump magazine from 1990 to 1992, and was published by Shueisha in 11 volumes.

Ogino worked on a third Peacock King series, Kujaku Ō: Magarigamiki (孔雀王 曲神紀), which was serialized in Young Jump from 2006 to 2010 for a total of 12 volumes. This continues Kujaku's adventures from Taimaseiden. It focuses on ancient Japan's gods and mythos as it branches from in the middle of the Taimaseiden story line. His fourth series Kujakoh Rising (孔雀王ライジング, Kujaku Ō Rising) ran in Monthly Big Comic Spirits since 2012 and has been published by Shogakukan in 6 volumes. Along with Rising, he published Kujakuoh: Sengoku Tensei (孔雀王-戦国転生-, Kujaku Ō: Sengoku Tensei) starting in 2012 for the magazine Comic Ran Twins.

Ogino was an honorary professor of the Shanghai Institute of Visual Art of Fudan University and Master of The Beijing DeTao Masters Academy.

Ogino died at 59 on April 29, 2019, due to renal failure.

== Works ==
Title	Year	Notes	Refs
Peacock King (孔雀王, Kujaku Ō)	1985–89	Serialized in Weekly Young Jump; Published by Shueisha in 17 volumes	
Kujaku Ō: Taimaseiden (孔雀王～退魔聖伝)	1990–92	Serialized in Young Jump; Published by Shueisha in 11 volumes	
Kujaku Ō: Magarigamiki (孔雀王～曲神紀)	2006–10	Serialized in Young Jump; Published by Shueisha in 12 volumes	
Kujaku Ō Rising (孔雀王ライジング)	2012–2019	Serialized in Monthly Big Comic Spirits; Published by Shogakukan in 10 volumes	
Kujaku Ō: Sengoku Tensei (孔雀王～戦国転生)	2012–2019	Serialized in Comic Ran Twins; Published by Leed in 5 volumes	
Gyōsei Denki Mao (暁星伝奇 真魚)	1992	Serialized in Young Jump Sunday	
Yasha Karasu (夜叉鴉; Yasha Crow)	1994–1997	Serialized in Young Jump Comics Special; Published in 10 volumes	
Kenjūshin (拳銃神, The Gun Spirit)	2000–2003	Serialized in Young Jump Comics; Published in 9 volumes	
Child (小類人)	1997–2000	Serialized in Young Jump Comics; Published in 7 volumes	
ALGO!	1990	Serialized in Young Jump Comics Special; Published in 3 volumes	
Onryōji (怨霊侍; Vengeful ghost samurai)	2005	Serialized in Young Jump Comics BJ; Published in 3 volumes	
Oboko (おぼこ)	2004	Serialized in Young Jump Comics BJ; Published in 1 volume	
Sarubia no Umi (サルビアの海)	2010-2012	Serialized in Magazine Magazine; Published in 1 volume	
Jūgo no haru (15の春; 15 Spring)	2011	Serialized in Jump Comics Deluxe; Published in 1 volume	
