= Tasogare Memorandum =

Japanese manga series

- First tankōbon volume cover

たそがれメモランダム (Tasogare Memorandamu)
- Genre: Slice of life
- Manga
- Written by: Akane Tamura
- Published by: Shogakukan
- Magazine: Monthly Big Comic Spirits
- Original run: April 26, 2014 – June 27, 2015
- Volumes: 2
- icon

Tasogare Memorandum (Japanese: たそがれメモランダム, Hepburn: Tasogare Memorandamu; "Twilight Memorandum") is a Japanese manga series written and illustrated by Akane Tamura. It was serialized in Shogakukan's seinen manga magazine Monthly Big Comic Spirits from April 2014 to June 2015.

== Plot ==
Tasogare Memorandum is a series of interconnected short stories following high school student Eri Takatori (高取 エリ, Takatori Eri), an aspiring journalist who observes the hidden sides of people during the twilight hours. As she writes for her school newspaper, Eri encounters unexpected truths about those around her—from a stern classics teacher who secretly reads children's comics to classmates with surprising after-school lives. The stories capture fleeting moments when familiar faces reveal unfamiliar selves, all while Eri navigates her own unrequited crush on her teacher and the quiet affection of a classmate who admires her. Set entirely during the ambiguous time of dusk, the work explores how people transform when day gives way to night.

== Publication ==
Written and illustrated by Akane Tamura, Tasogare Memorandum was serialized in Shogakukan's seinen manga magazine Monthly Big Comic Spirits from April 26, 2014, to June 27, 2015. Shogakukan collected its chapters in two tankōbon volumes, released on March 12 and September 11, 2015.

=== Volumes ===
No.	Japanese release date	Japanese ISBN
1	March 12, 2015	978-4-09-186808-4
2	September 11, 2015	978-4-09-187276-0
