= Misaki, Number 1!! =

Japanese manga series

- First tankōbon volume cover

美咲ナンバーワン!! (Misaki Nanbā Wan!!)
- Manga
- Written by: Masato Fujisaki
- Published by: Shogakukan
- Magazine: Weekly Big Comic Spirits (2008); Monthly Big Comic Spirits (2010–2011)
- Original run: June 2, 2008 – January 27, 2011
- Volumes: 2
- Television drama
- Directed by: Tarō Ōtani; Masahiro Mori; Jun Ishio
- Written by: Michiru Egashira; Yuko Matsuda; Mika Umeda
- Music by: Michiru Ōshima
- Original network: Nippon TV
- Original run: January 12, 2011 – March 16, 2011
- Episodes: 10
- icon

Misaki, Number 1!! (Japanese: 美咲ナンバーワン!!, Hepburn: Misaki Nanbā Wan!!) is a Japanese manga series written and illustrated by Masato Fujisaki. It was first serialized in Shogakukan's seinen manga magazine Weekly Big Comic Spirits in 2008, and later in Monthly Big Comic Spirits from 2010 to 2011. Its chapters were collected in two tankōbon volumes. A ten-episode television drama was broadcast on Nippon TV in 2011.

== Synopsis ==
Misaki Tennoji, the number one cabaret girl at Roppongi's "Club Southern Sea", becomes a teacher at Midō Gakuen High School, at the strong recommendation of Principal Tamatsukuri. On her first day, the principal assigns her to be in charge of Class 2Z, a special class for students who are not attending school due to various problems. The students were gathered as a compromise between the principal's faction, which wanted to graduate any student without abandoning them, and the vice principal's faction, which believed that expulsion was unavoidable for students with problems. When Misaki learns of this situation at the welcoming party for the new class, she is inspired to help the students recover from their problems by drawing on her own childhood memories and her experience as a cabaret club hostess.

== Media ==
=== Manga ===
Written and illustrated by Masato Fujisaki, Misaki, Number 1!! started in Shogakukan's seinen manga magazine Weekly Big Comic Spirits on June 2, 2008. Following a two-year hiatus, the manga was later serialized in Monthly Big Comic Spirits from October 27, 2010, to January 27, 2011. (Note: Serialized until the magazine's March 2011 issue, released on January 27 of that same year.) Shogakukan collected its chapters in two tankōbon volumes, released on September 30, 2008, and February 26, 2011.

==== Volumes ====
No.	Japanese release date	Japanese ISBN
1	September 30, 2008	978-4-09-182203-1
2	February 26, 2011	978-4-09-183663-2

=== Drama ===
A ten-episode television drama adaptation was broadcast on Nippon TV from January 12 to March 16, 2011.

== See also ==
- Wild Life, another manga series by the same author
