= Mystic Defender =

1989 video game

- North American cover art
- Developer: Sega
- Publisher: Sega
- Artists: Rieko Kodama; Takako Kawaguchi
- Composer: Chikako Kamatani
- Platform: Genesis/Mega Drive
- Release: JP: November 25, 1989; NA: December 1989; EU: 1990
- Genre: Action
- Mode: Single-player

Mystic Defender is a two-dimensional action run and gun video game released for the Sega Genesis. Initially titled Kujaku Ō 2: Gen'eijō (孔雀王2 幻影城) in Japan and based on the anime/manga Kujaku Ō, it is the sequel to SpellCaster for the Master System.

== Plot ==
Mystic Defender takes place in an alternate Japan fantasy setting in which the anarchistic sorcerer Zareth kidnaps a young woman named Alexandra. Zareth plans to use Alexandra as a sacrifice for the resurrecting of an ancient and evil god known as Zao. Not long after the kidnapping, Zareth's plan becomes apparent as Azuchi castle - the dwelling of Zao - rises from the waters.

Joe Yamato, an experienced sorcerer, is called into action to save Alexandra and stop Zareth's plan to resurrect Zao by battling his way through the dark and bizarre disciples and demons of Zao.

== Gameplay ==
The player's only means of defense in the game is the use of magical spells that can be acquired by finding the power-ups.

The player starts with a single shooting ball of energy that can be charged to fire one powerful shot. The player can also acquire a spiritual flame that can be pointed in straight and diagonal directions and has a long reach when charged. Finally, the player can acquire a spherical power that launches ricocheting spheres around the screen which multiply when fully charged.

Aside from these powers, the player can also use a screen-clearing attack that summons a three-headed dragon which destroys all enemies and fired shots onscreen.

== Reception ==
Reception

Review scores
Publication	Score
Aktueller Software Markt	48/60
Electronic Gaming Monthly	8/10, 5/10, 7/10, 8/10
Jeuxvideo.com	15/20

Michael Suck, of Aktueller Software Markt, thought it was an excellent action game.
