= Oyasumi Karasu, Mata Kite ne =

Japanese manga series

- First tankōbon volume cover

おやすみカラスまた来てね。
- Manga
- Written by: Ryo Ikuemi
- Published by: Shogakukan
- Magazine: Monthly Big Comic Spirits
- Original run: August 27, 2014 – April 27, 2022
- Volumes: 7

Oyasumi Karasu, Mata Kite ne (おやすみカラスまた来てね。; "Good Night Crow, Come By Again") is a Japanese manga series written and illustrated by Ryo Ikuemi. It was serialized in Shogakukan's seinen manga magazine Monthly Big Comic Spirits from August 2014 to April 2022, with its chapters collected in seven tankōbon volumes.

== Publication ==
Written and illustrated by Ryo Ikuemi, Oyasumi Karasu, Mata Kite ne was serialized in Shogakukan's seinen manga magazine Monthly Big Comic Spirits from August 27, 2014, to April 27, 2022. Shogakukan collected its chapters in seven tankōbon volumes, released from June 10, 2016, to June 23, 2022.

=== Volumes ===
| No. | Japanese release date | Japanese ISBN |
|---|---|---|
| 1 | June 10, 2016 | 978-4-09-187628-7 |
| 2 | November 10, 2017 | 978-4-09-189685-8 |
| 3 | December 12, 2018 | 978-4-09-860147-9 |
| 4 | December 12, 2019 | 978-4-09-860460-9 |
| 5 | October 12, 2020 | 978-4-09-860725-9 |
| 6 | August 11, 2021 | 978-4-09-861122-5 |
| 7 | June 23, 2022 | 978-4-09-861356-4 |
