= Kimajime-hime to Bunbōgu-ōji =

Japanese manga series

- First tankōbon volume cover

きまじめ姫と文房具王子
- Manga
- Written by: Aako Fujiwara
- Published by: Shogakukan
- Magazine: Monthly Big Comic Spirits
- Original run: March 27, 2017 – November 27, 2020
- Volumes: 5
- icon

Kimajime-hime to Bunbōgu-ōji (きまじめ姫と文房具王子; "Serious Princess and Stationery Prince") is a Japanese manga series written and illustrated by Aako Fujiwara. It was serialized in Shogakukan's seinen manga magazine Monthly Big Comic Spirits from March 2017 to November 2020.

== Publication ==
Written and illustrated by Aako Fujiwara, Kimajime-hime to Bunbōgu-ōji was serialized in Shogakukan's seinen manga magazine Monthly Big Comic Spirits from March 27, 2017, to November 27, 2020. Shogakukan collected its chapters in five tankōbon volumes, released from May 12, 2017, to March 12, 2021.

=== Volumes ===
No.	Japanese release date	Japanese ISBN
1	January 12, 2018	978-4-09-189831-9
2	October 12, 2018	978-4-09-860089-2
3	August 9, 2019	978-4-09-860379-4
4	May 12, 2020	978-4-09-860613-9
5	March 12, 2021	978-4-09-860863-8
