= Miracle Warriors: Seal of the Dark Lord =

1986 video game

- The censored North American cover art
- Developers: Kogado Software Products; Sega (Master System)
- Publishers: Kogado Software Products; Sega (Master System); ASCII (Famicom)
- Artist: Rieko Kodama
- Platforms: Master System, MSX, Famicom, NEC PC-8801, MSX2, FM-7, Sharp X1
- Release: PC-88: JP: 1986; FM-7: JP: October 1986; Sharp X1: JP: November 1986; MSX: JP: 1987; Master System: JP: October 18, 1987; NA: October 1988; EU: November 1988; Famicom: JP: October 23, 1987
- Genre: Role-playing
- Mode: Single-player

Miracle Warriors: Seal of the Dark Lord, known as Haja no Fūin (覇邪の封印; lit. Seal of the Dark Lord) in Japan, is a role-playing video game initially released by Kogado Software Products for the NEC PC-8801 in 1986. It was then ported to various other systems, including a Master System port developed by Sega, which was released internationally. In the game, Demon Queen Terarin has unleashed dark creatures upon the world, and it is up to a young hero, joined by three companions, to restore peace by defeating her and sealing her away once again.

== Gameplay ==
Overworld traveling in the Master System version. The terrain shows a town on a plains and parts of the landscape. The information box below the map shows the player's money, herbs, fangs, and character points. In the lower left all party members, their experience and life are shown

Each screen of the game consists of four parts. In the lower left are all character statistics. It lists all characters in the party. Each character has a life bar and experience bar. A single character can gain experience by hitting enemies. Once the experiences is full, a new level is reached. The experience bar is emptied and both bars are extended, resulting in more maximum life for the character and more experience needed to gain a new level. On the lower right are statistics for the entire party (for example the amount of money).

The upper right section varies from screen to screen. While traveling the world, a town or a maze, a map is shown where the player can navigate. If the player invokes the main menu, it will be shown there. In battle it shows the battle menu. The upper left section also varies. While traveling the world or a cave it shows the party members and their surroundings. In battle it shows the foe and in town it shows persons to which the player can talk and their dialogue.

Once the player encounters an enemy, the screen switches to battle mode. In the battle mode, the player can choose one character to attack per turn. This character will also be subjected to the attack of the enemy, unless the enemy uses a spell that attacks multiple players. Some enemies can use flame spells to attack all party members or sleep spells that can put multiple party members to sleep. Every time a party member is put to sleep they take damage. They can wake up and be put to sleep many times during a battle, taking damage each time they fall asleep again. Once every party member is sleeping, the enemy will use a flame spell to attack every party member at once.

As an alternative to attack, a player has several options, including talking, retreating, using a magical item, or casting a spell. Some enemies respond to talking and give hints.

The currency in the game is the guilder which can be used to buy items or heal the players. Defeated enemies also yield fangs, which are proof of valor in battle. Fangs can be used to buy some exclusive items or traded in villages for guilders. Defeating enemies can also increase or decrease the player's character points (fame). Killing monsters usually increases the player's fame while killing good characters (for example merchants) decreases the player's fame. A certain number of character points is required to enter certain villages.

The game takes place in a world of five lands spread out over three continents and came with an elaborate grid-format map noting areas of interest in the game. There are four types of land: plain, forest, mountains and desert. Enemies become more dangerous in different types of land, with plains being the safest terrain to cross. The continents are separated by oceans and storming sea around the last continent. A ship is required to sail the oceans. A special ship is needed to cross the storming sea but it can only be helmed by someone with pirate blood in his veins.

Throughout the world are several towns. Towns have smiths, who can repair weapons and armor, and healers that can heal and sell herbs. Shops sell weapons and armor and some towns provide information while one person in every town buys fangs for fifty guilders each. There are also villages, which serve special purposes, such as selling ships or special magical items. Several caves exist in the world. They house guardians that protect the mystical armors of legend. Finally there are also various castles that can be visited to get the weapons of legends if the kings are impressed enough.

== Plot ==
Demon Queen Terarin (orig. Terralin テラリン) has returned. She has stolen the Golden Seal and opened the Pandora Passage, letting loose dark creatures into the world. A young hero (unnamed in all but the Famicom version, where he is named Argus or Algus (アーガス, āgasu)) is tasked by a king to restore peace to his world. He must step into footsteps of his ancestor Iason, who once fought to seal the demoness in another dimension, to finish the job and bring an end to Terarin's evil once and for all.

The hero must enlist the aid of three companions, Guy (ガイ, gai) the warrior, Medi (Media (メディア, media)) the amazon, and Treo (Treymos (トレモス, toremosu)) the pirate (called Turo in the English manual), and find the three keys to Terarin's Lair in an underground temple. To defeat her, they must also find a set of ancient mystical weapons and armor.

== Reception ==
Miracle Warriors for the Master System received mostly positive reviews. Console XS gave it an 84% score. It was also rated 40% by The Games Machine, 77% by S: The Sega Magazine, and 80% by Tilt.

== Legacy ==
The game was followed by a sequel titled Wings of Arugisu (アルギースの翼) which was released for the MSX2 by Kogado in 1988.

It is the first officially released JRPG to be localized into English, with its Master System port in 1988.
