= Santiago: Rebellion Shimabara =

Japanese manga series

- First tankōbon volume cover

SANTIAGO―レベリオン・シマバラ― (Sanchago Reberion Shimabara)
- Genre: Historical
- Manga
- Written by: Masaki Enjoji
- Published by: Shogakukan
- Magazine: Monthly Big Comic Spirits
- Original run: January 27, 2014 – October 27, 2015
- Volumes: 3

Santiago: Rebellion Shimabara (Japanese: SANTIAGO―レベリオン・シマバラ―, Hepburn: Sanchago Reberion Shimabara) is a Japanese manga series written and illustrated by Masaki Enjoji. It was serialized in Shogakukan's seinen manga magazine Monthly Big Comic Spirits from January 2014 to October 2015, with its chapters collected in three tankōbon volumes.

== Publication ==
Written and illustrated by Masaki Enjoji, Santiago: Rebellion Shimabara was serialized in Shogakukan's seinen manga magazine Monthly Big Comic Spirits from January 27, 2014, to October 27, 2015. Its twenty chapters were collected by Shogakukan in three tankōbon volumes, released from September 30, 2014, to December 11, 2015.

=== Volumes ===
No.	Japanese release date	Japanese ISBN
1	September 30, 2014	978-4-09-186417-8
2	May 12, 2015	978-4-09-186899-2
3	December 11, 2015	978-4-09-187354-5
