= Hen na Mono Mikke! =

Japanese manga series

- First tankōbon volume cover

へんなものみっけ！
- Genre: Comedy
- Manga
- Written by: Tomo Sawara
- Published by: Shogakukan
- Magazine: Monthly Big Comic Spirits
- Original run: September 27, 2016 – present
- Volumes: 13
- icon

Hen na Mono Mikke! (へんなものみっけ！; lit. 'I Found Something Strange!') is a Japanese manga series written and illustrated by Tomo Sawara. It has been serialized in Shogakukan's seinen manga magazine Monthly Big Comic Spirits since September 2016.

== Publication ==
Written and illustrated by Keita Yatera, Hen na Mono Mikke! has been serialized in Shogakukan's seinen manga magazine Monthly Big Comic Spirits since September 27, 2016. Shogakukan has collected its chapters into individual tankōbon volumes. The first volume was released on July 12, 2017. As of August 10, 2026, thirteen volumes have been released.

=== Volumes ===
No.	Japanese release date	Japanese ISBN
1	July 12, 2017	978-4-09-189545-5
2	March 12, 2018	978-4-09-189810-4
3	December 12, 2018	978-4-09-860145-5
4	August 9, 2019	978-4-09-860378-7
5	July 30, 2020	978-4-09-860654-2
6	April 12, 2021	978-4-09-860881-2
7	January 12, 2022	978-4-09-861217-8
8	November 10, 2022	978-4-09-861461-5
9	September 22, 2023	978-4-09-861738-8
10	March 12, 2024	978-4-09-862755-4
11	March 12, 2025	978-4-09-863197-1
12	October 10, 2025	978-4-09-863570-2
13	August 10, 2026	978-4-09-864067-6
