= Peacock King =

Japanese fantasy media franchise

- First tankōbon volume cover, featuring Kujaku

孔雀王 (Kujaku Ō)
- Genre: Action, fantasy
- Manga
- Written by: Makoto Ogino
- Published by: Shueisha (series 1–3); Leed (series 4)
- English publisher: NA: Manga Planet (digital)
- Magazine: Weekly Young Jump (1985–2009); Monthly Young Jump (2009–2010); Comic Ran Twins (2012–2016); Comic Ran (2016–2019)
- Original run: 1985 – 2019
- Volumes: 45
- Series titles
- 1. Kujaku Ō (1985–1989, 17 volumes); 2. Taimaseiden (1990–1992, 11 volumes); 3. Magarigamiki (2006–2010, 12 volumes); 4. Sengoku Tensei (2012–2019, 5 volumes)
- Original video animation

Spirit Warrior
- Directed by: Katsuhito Akiyama (#1, #3); Ichirō Itano (#2); Rintaro (#4–5)
- Written by: Shō Aikawa (#1–3); Leo Natsuki (#1–3); Kazuhiro Inaba (#4–5); Tatsuhiko Urahata (#4–5)
- Music by: Yas Kaz (#1–3); Toshiyuki Honda (#4–5)
- Studio: AIC (#1, 3); Studio 88 (#2); Madhouse (#4–5)
- Licensed by: NA: U.S. Manga Corps (expired)
- Released: 1988 – 1994
- Runtime: 50 minutes
- Episodes: 5
- Live-action film
- Directed by: Lam Ngai Kai
- Written by: Izō Hashimoto; Kazuki Sekizumi
- Music by: Micky Yoshino
- Studio: Toho; Golden Harvest
- Released: December 10, 1988
- Runtime: 96 minutes
- Live-action film

Saga of the Phoenix
- Directed by: Lam Ngai Kai
- Written by: Hirohisa Soda
- Music by: Philip Chan Fei-Lit
- Studio: Toho; Orange Sky Golden Harvest; Golden Harvest
- Released: 1990
- Runtime: 93 minutes
- Manga

Kujaku Ō: Rising
- Written by: Makoto Ogino
- Published by: Shogakukan
- Magazine: Monthly Big Comic Spirits
- Original run: October 30, 2012 – July 30, 2019
- Volumes: 10
- icon

Peacock King (Japanese: 孔雀王, Hepburn: Kujaku Ō) is a Japanese manga series written and illustrated by Makoto Ogino. It was serialized in Shueisha's seinen manga magazine Weekly Young Jump from 1985 to 1989, with its chapters collected in 17 tankōbon volumes. It spawned four other manga series. The original manga was licensed in North America in 2020 by Manga Planet.

Peacock King was adapted into a five-episode original video animation (OVA), released from 1988 to 1994, and licensed in North America by U.S. Manga Corps, under the title Spirit Warrior. Two live-action films were released, in 1988 and 1990.

== Story ==
Kujaku is a Buddhist monk who specializes in exorcism and devil hunting. He is a member of Ura-Kōya, a secret organization in Japan that specializes in demon hunting. Kujaku confronts Rikudoshu (六道衆), a secret evil organization led by the Teachers of Eight Leaves (八葉の老師). The goal of the Teachers of Eight Leaves is to revive Peacock King and Snake Queen, and allow them to fight each other to give birth to the ultimate Dark Vairocana (闇の大日如来). During the story, the Teachers of Eight Leaves tried various methods to achieve their goal, but were ultimately defeated by Kujaku and his friends.

== Characters ==
Kujaku (孔雀)
Voiced by: Toshihiko Seki (1st OVA), Kōji Tsujitani (2nd OVA) (Japanese); Edward Morrisson Garland (English)
Portrayed by: Hiroshi Mikami (1st film) (Japanese); Hiroshi Abe (2nd film) (English)
A Kōya Hijiri monk in his twenties and the hero of the story. His real name is Akira (明), the son of a monk named Jikaku and a female pilgrim or Ksitigarbha (地蔵菩薩, Jizō Bosatsu). He is the reincarnation of Mahamayuri (孔雀明王, Kujaku Myō-ō), Lucifer, and Melek Taus, which grants him an immense spiritual power. Most of the time, however, Kujaku behaves like the young man he is, being carefree, lecherous and a glutton. He uses a vajra in exorcisms.
Ashura (阿修羅)
Voiced by: Arisa Andō (1st OVA), Miki Itō (2nd OVA) (Japanese); Alissa Stein (English)
Portrayed by: Gloria Yip
A girl chosen by the god Asura King (阿修羅王, Ashura Ou). She was found by Ura-Kouya in a village, where she was hated and feared for her spiritual powers. Being 12 to 15 years old through the story, Ashura is usually rebellious and feisty, and also has a crush on Kujaku, which makes her jealous in several instances. She also loves fashion and often changes her appearance from her natural blond hair. She has pyrokinetic abilities and can generate a great amount of spiritual energy to transfer to her allies.
Tarōja Onimaru (王仁丸 太郎邪, Onimaru Tarōja)
Voiced by: Hiroya Ishimaru (1st OVA, episode #1), Tesshō Genda (1st OVA, episodes #2–3), Yūsaku Yara (2nd OVA) (Japanese); Michael Schwartz (English)
Kujaku's greatest rival, a half-demon half-human Jukondō master who works as a mercenary. He is superhumanly strong and has regenerative abilities, and specializes in controlling evil spirits. Although he and Kujaku were enemies in their first encounter, they quickly became friends, which turned Onimaru into somewhat of a recurrent reinforcement ally for Kujaku and his friends. His guardian god is Mahakala (大暗黒天, Daiankokuten).
Kō Kaihō (黄 海峰)
Voiced by: Kazuhiko Inoue (1st OVA), Norio Wakamoto (2nd OVA) (Japanese); Dan Truman (English)
Kujaku's second rival, the young heir of a Chinese clan of sorcerers named Hakka Sendo. He is a master of Huáng-jiā Xiāndào (黄家仙道) and uses the sword Shikoken (獅咬剣). Like Onimaru, he started as an enemy to Kujaku before joining forces with him and developing an uneasy friendship with him. He later falls in love with Kujaku's sister Tomoko, which causes him to give in to darkness in order to try to save her from her fate. After being saved by Kujaku, he marries Tomoko and has a son with her.
Jikū Ajari (慈空 阿闍梨)
Voiced by: Gorō Naya (1st OVA), Ichirō Nagai (2nd OVA) (Japanese); Matthew Harrington (English)
Portrayed by: Ken Ogata (1st film), Shintaro Katsu (2nd film)
Kujaku's old master. He knew Kujaku's father and was entrusted with him. Despite his wisdom and age, he is a bit of an alcoholic and as perverted as his apprentice.
Nikkō (日光)
Voiced by: Akira Kamiya (1st OVA), Ken Yamaguchi (2nd OVA) (Japanese); Ed Kissel (English)
Head priest of Ura-Kōya and Kujaku's senpai. He tries to be much more serious about their work. His guardian god is Mahāvairocana (大日如来, Dainichi Nyorai).
Tomoko (朋子)
Voiced by: Noriko Hidaka
Kujaku's sister, an incarnation of the Rahu (天蛇王, Tenjaō). She became separated from Kujaku as a child and was brought up by a Neo-Nazi cult, which tried to wake up her spiritual power to use her as a weapon.
Tsukuyomi (月読)
Voiced by: Miina Tominaga (1st OVA), Hiromi Tsuru (2nd OVA) (Japanese); Denise Gottwald (English)
The mistress of the women's prayer room at Ura-Kōya. She is in love with Kujaku. Her guardian god is Candraprabha (月光菩薩, Gakkou Bosatsu)

== Media ==
=== Manga ===
Written and illustrated by Makoto Ogino, Peacock King was first serialized in Shueisha's seinen manga magazine Weekly Young Jump from 1985 to 1989. Its chapters were collected in seventeen tankōbon volumes, released from July 1, 1986, to May 1, 1990.

A sequel, Kujaku Ō: Taimaseiden (孔雀王 退魔聖伝), was serialized in Weekly Young Jump from 1990 to 1992. Shueisha collected its chapters in eleven tankōbon volumes, released from February 1, 1991, to December 1, 1993.

A second sequel, Kujaku Ō: Magarigamiki (孔雀王 曲神紀), was serialized in Weekly Young Jump from March 23, 2006, to October 22, 2009, (Note: Issues: #17 (2006) – #47 (2009; dates of each issue:)) and later in Monthly Young Jump from November 17, 2009, to February 16, 2010. (Note: Issues: December 2009 – March 2010 (dates of each issue:)) Shueisha collected its chapters in twelve tankōbon volumes, released from August 18, 2006, to March 19, 2010.

A spin-off series, Kujaku Ō: Rising (孔雀王 ライジング), was serialized in Shogakukan's Monthly Big Comic Spirits from March 27, 2012, to June 27, 2019. Shogakukan collected its chapters in ten tankōbon volumes, released from October 30, 2012, to July 30, 2019.

A third sequel, Kujaku Ō: Sengoku Tensei (孔雀王 ～戦国転生～) was published in Leed's Comic Ran Twins from October 26, 2012, to June 27, 2016, and later in Comic Ran from October 27, 2016, to June 27, 2019. Leed collected the chapters in five tankōbon volumes, released from December 27, 2013, to July 30, 2019.

=== Films ===
The manga has been adapted into two Hong Kong live action films, Peacock King and Saga of the Phoenix, both directed by Lam Ngai Kai. The former, released in 1988, stars Hiroshi Mikami and Yuen Biao as the two monks (Kujaku and a new character Kǒngquè, respectively), and Gloria Yip as Ashura. Gordon Liu, Kara Wai and Philip Kwok appear in supporting roles.

=== Video games ===
==== Family Computer ====
Kujaku Ō (孔雀王; 'Peacock King')
The first of two Family Computer (Famicom) adventure games. In it the player takes the role of a band of heroes fighting against evil demons. The player interacts with the story by selecting actions from a list of options on screen (look, take, talk etc) and by a simple 'point-and-click interface. The game was released only in Japan for the Famicom on September 21, 1988, by Pony Canyon.
Kujaku Ō II (孔雀王II; 'Peacock King II')
A graphic/point-and-click adventure. The player interacts with the story by selecting actions from a list of options on screen (look, take, talk etc) and by a simple 'point-and-click interface. The graphics have been improved over its predecessor. It is also available on the MSX Japanese computer. Released on the Nintendo Famicom by Pony Canyon in Japan on August 21, 1990.

==== Sega ====
Kujaku Ō (孔雀王; 'Peacock King')
Sega Mark III, September 23, 1988 (released as SpellCaster in Western markets)
Kujaku Ō 2: Gen'eijō (孔雀王2 幻影城; 'Peacock King 2: Castle of Illusion')
Mega Drive, November 25, 1989 (released as Mystic Defender in Western markets)
