= Do You Like the Nerdy Nurse? =

Japanese manga series

- First tankōbon volume cover

保健室のおたくおねえさんは好きですか? (Hokenshitsu no Otaku Onē-san wa Suki desu ka?)
- Genre: Romantic comedy
- Manga
- Written by: Arata Kawabata
- Published by: Shogakukan
- English publisher: NA: Yen Press
- Magazine: Yawaraka Spirits
- Original run: October 3, 2018 – October 4, 2019
- Volumes: 2
- icon

Do You Like the Nerdy Nurse? (Japanese: 保健室のおたくおねえさんは好きですか?, Hepburn: Hokenshitsu no Otaku Onē-san wa Suki desu ka?) is a Japanese web manga series written and illustrated by Arata Kawabata. It was serialized on Shogakukan's website Yawaraka Spirits from October 2018 to October 2019, with its chapters collected in two tankōbon volumes.

== Publication ==
Written and illustrated by Arata Kawabata, Do You Like the Nerdy Nurse? was serialized on Shogakukan's website Yawaraka Spirits from October 3, 2018, to October 4, 2019. Shogakukan collected its chapters in two tankōbon volumes, released on May 10 and November 12, 2019.

In North America, the manga was licensed for English release by Yen Press and released in a single volume on March 2, 2021.

=== Volumes ===
No.	Original release date	Original ISBN	English release date	English ISBN
1	May 10, 2019	978-4-09-860341-1	March 2, 2021	978-1-9753-1975-5
2	November 12, 2019	978-4-09-860506-4	March 2, 2021	978-1-9753-1975-5

== See also ==
- Shingun no Cadet, another manga series by the same author
