= Shichigatsu no Hone =

Japanese manga series

- First tankōbon volume cover

七月の骨
- Manga
- Written by: Satoshi Yoshida
- Published by: Shogakukan
- Magazine: Weekly Big Comic Spirits (2010–2011); Monthly Big Comic Spirits (2011–2013)
- Original run: December 20, 2010 – March 27, 2013
- Volumes: 6

Shichigatsu no Hone (七月の骨; "Remains of July") is a Japanese manga series written and illustrated by Satoshi Yoshida. It was serialized in Shogakukan's seinen manga magazine Monthly Big Comic Spirits from February 2011 to November 2020.

== Publication ==
Written and illustrated by Satoshi Yoshida, Shichigatsu no Hone was first published as a one-shot in Shogakukan's seinen manga magazine Weekly Big Comic Spirits on October 18, 2010. It later debuted as a serialized manga in the same magazine, being published from December 20, 2010, to January 17, 2011. It was then transferred to Monthly Big Comic Spirits, being serialized from February 26, 2011, to March 27, 2013. Shogakukan collected its chapters in six tankōbon volumes, released from July 29, 2011, to May 30, 2013

=== Volumes ===
No.	Japanese release date	Japanese ISBN
1	July 29, 2011	978-4-09-184090-5
2	October 28, 2011	978-4-09-184214-5
3	April 27, 2012	978-4-09-184548-1
4	August 30, 2012	978-4-09-184704-1
5	January 30, 2013	978-4-09-185070-6
6	May 30, 2013	978-4-09-185314-1
