= Vivre Yōsai-ten =

Japanese manga series

- Vivre Yōsai-ten: Kinuyo to Harriet
- First tankōbon volume cover

ヴィーヴル洋裁店〜キヌヨとハリエット〜 (Vīvuru Yōsai-ten Kinuyo to Harietto)
- Genre: Fantasy
- Manga
- Written by: Takashi Wada
- Published by: Shogakukan
- Imprint: Big Spirits Comics
- Magazine: Monthly Big Comic Spirits
- Original run: December 27, 2018 – August 26, 2020
- Volumes: 4

Vivre Yōsai-ten: Kinuyo to Harriet (Japanese: ヴィーヴル洋裁店〜キヌヨとハリエット〜, Hepburn: Vīvuru Yōsai-ten Kinuyo to Harietto; Vivre Dressmaking Shop: Kinuyo and Harriet) is a Japanese manga series written and illustrated by Takashi Wada. It was serialized in Shogakukan's seinen manga magazine Monthly Big Comic Spirits from December 2018 to August 2020, with its chapters collected in four tankōbon volumes.

== Publication ==
Written and illustrated by Takashi Wada, Vivre Yōsai-ten was serialized in Shogakukan's seinen manga magazine Monthly Big Comic Spirits from December 27, 2018, to August 26, 2020. Shogakukan collected its chapters in four tankōbon volumes, released from June 12, 2019, to January 12, 2021.

The manga has been licensed in France by Soleil.

=== Volumes ===
No.	Japanese release date	Japanese ISBN
1	June 12, 2019	978-4-09-860308-4
2	February 12, 2020	978-4-09-860477-7
3	August 7, 2020	978-4-09-860652-8
4	January 12, 2021	978-4-09-860803-4
