= Ushiharu =

Japanese manga series

- First tankōbon volume cover

ウシハル
- Genre: Comedy; Slice of life
- Manga
- Written by: Yukiko Gotō
- Published by: Shogakukan
- Magazine: Monthly Big Comic Spirits (2009–2010); Weekly Big Comic Spirits (2010–2011)
- Original run: November 27, 2009 – November 28, 2011
- Volumes: 5
- icon

Ushiharu (ウシハル) is a Japanese manga series written and illustrated by Yukiko Gotō. It was serialized in Shogakukan's seinen manga magazines Monthly Big Comic Spirits (2009–2010) and Weekly Big Comic Spirits (2010–2011), with its chapters collected in five tankōbon volumes.

== Publication ==
Written and illustrated by Yukiko Gotō, Ushiharu was serialized in Shogakukan's seinen manga magazines Monthly Big Comic Spirits from November 27, 2009, to June 26, 2010. The manga was transferred to Weekly Big Comic Spirits on July 5, 2010; an additional chapter was published in Monthly Big Comic Spirits on September 27, 2010. The series finished on November 28, 2011. Shogakukan collected its chapters in five tankōbon volumes, released from September 30, 2010, to January 30, 2012.

=== Volumes ===
No.	Release date	ISBN
1	September 30, 2010	978-4-09-183479-9
2	January 28, 2011	978-4-09-183732-5
3	June 30, 2011	978-4-09-183880-3
4	October 28, 2011	978-4-09-184213-8
5	January 30, 2012	978-4-09-184330-2

== See also ==
- Phobia, another manga series illustrated by Yukiko Gotō
