= SpellCaster (video game) =

1989 video game

- North American cover art
- Developer: Sega
- Publisher: Sega
- Designers: Nanno Koreshiki; Izumi Black 55; Alex Yoko; Rieko Kodama; Naoto Ohshima
- Composer: Sachio Ogawa
- Platform: Master System
- Release: JP: September 23, 1988; NA: September 1989; EU: 1989
- Genre: Action RPG
- Mode: Single-player

SpellCaster, known in Japan as Kujaku Ō (孔雀王, Peacock King) and in South America as Warrior Quest, is a 1988 video game developed and published by Sega for the Master System.

In Japan a sequel, known in western markets as Mystic Defender, was released in 1989 for the Sega Genesis.

== Plot ==
The game starts when Kane is summoned by Daikak, the great leader of the Summit Temple, to stop a war between factions of warlords. The player explores temples and defeats enemies like ghosts, ninja and feral beasts. There are also villages to explore and people to talk to as the player assembles clues on who desecrated his home town's temple and killed its guardians. The quest takes the player across medieval Japan and to the Underworld.

== Reception ==
S: The Sega Magazine gave the game a positive review, giving it a 91% score.
