= Champion Boxing =

1984 video game

- North American arcade flyer
- Developer(s): Sega
- Publisher(s): Sega
- Designer(s): Yoji Ishii
- Programmer(s): Yu Suzuki
- Artist(s): Rieko Kodama
- Platform(s): SG-1000, Arcade, MSX
- Release: SG-1000: JP: October 1984; EU: 1985; Arcade: JP: November 1984; NA: 1984
- Genre(s): Sports, fighting
- Mode(s): Single-player, multiplayer

Champion Boxing (チャンピオンボクシング, "Boxing Champion") is a 1984 boxing sports video game developed and published by Sega for the SG-1000, and later ported to the arcades, only in Japan and Europe. It was Sega-AM2 founder and leader Yu Suzuki's debut creation, as well as that of Rieko Kodama. In 1985, a successor of Champion Boxing titled Champion Pro Wrestling was released in the arcades, and ported to the SG-1000 and the MSX home computer the same year. However, this is a professional wrestling game instead of a boxing game.

== Development ==
Yu Suzuki described Champion Boxing as a minor project with very little staff, and said that because of this it allowed him to learn the process of games development with very little pressure. Because the game was understaffed for designers, Suzuki actually contributed some of the drawings for the various punching animations.

According to Suzuki, the game was developed for the SG-1000 first, and then the arcade version was created by simply installing an SG-1000 in an arcade cabinet.

Pengo makes a cameo after a KO.
