= Trimmer (construction) =

In light-frame construction, a trimmer is a timber or metal beam (joist) used to create an opening around a stairwell, skylight, chimney, and the like. Trimmers are installed parallel to the primary floor or ceiling joists and support headers, which run perpendicular to the primary joists.

It can also refer to a jack stud that supports a header above a window or door opening.

Traditionally, a stud which was less than full length was sometimes referred to as a cripple.
