= Takao Miyoshi =

Japanese video game developer

Takao Miyoshi (見吉 隆夫, Miyoshi Takao) is a former game producer at Sega. Miyoshi joined in 1990, and first worked on the Sega Meganet minigames for the Genesis and then, had design roles for Formula One World Championship: Beyond the Limit, Sonic 3D Blast, Burning Rangers and Sonic Adventure. His debut as director was Phantasy Star Online, he then produced for Phantasy Star Universe, succeeding Yuji Naka. Similar to a Sega Meganet game, he produced a smaller scale downloadable called Pole's Big Adventure in 2009. He left Sega afterwards after spending his last years at the company as senior producer, and let Satoshi Sakai succeed him as producer for the Phantasy Star franchise.

Later he joined Y's net, which Yu Suzuki established, and Prope, which Yuji Naka established.
