= Dreamcast Magazine =

Dreamcast Magazine may refer to:

- Dreamcast Magazine, British magazine published by Paragon Publishing
- Dreamcast Magazine or Dorimaga, names for the Japanese magazine later known as Gemaga
- Official Dreamcast Magazine (UK), published by Dennis Publishing
- Official Dreamcast Magazine (US), published by Imagine Media, Inc.
