= Pole's Big Adventure =

2009 video game

- Developers: Sega; Mobile & Game Studio; Flat-Out
- Publisher: Sega
- Platform: Wii (WiiWare)
- Release: JP: February 3, 2009
- Genre: Platform
- Mode: Single-player

Chindōchū!! Pōru no Daibōken (珍道中!!ポールの大冒険, lit. "On a Weird Way!! Pole's Big Adventure" (Note: 「ポール(paul)」とは？ カタカナ語の意味・発音・類語辞典 The Japanese katakana "Pōru" is typically a transliteration of the common Anglo name "Paul", however early translators of this title chose to render the character's name into English as "Pole".)) is a platform game by Sega for WiiWare. It is produced by Phantasy Star Universe producer Takao Miyoshi, and was released in Japan on February 3, 2009.

Pole's Big Adventure uses an 8-bit style presentation and gameplay reminiscent of Nintendo Entertainment System and Master System platform games. The game also pokes fun at the conventions of these games (particularly Super Mario Bros.), sometimes using a crude sense of humor and frequent references to the fourth wall.

== Plot ==
The game involves Pole, a cowboy, rescuing his girlfriend Sharon from a kidnapper. At the end of each level Pole "rescues" Sharon, only to find she is a poorly-disguised enemy character.

== Gameplay ==
Pole's Big Adventure is a side-scrolling platform game. Pole kills enemies with a shotgun that can be upgraded, and fights several bosses. Although there are six levels, the main objective of the game is for the player to stumble across the many gags hidden in the game. Each gag is highlighted for the player through on screen text and voice over from an announcer.

There are 100 gags for the player to uncover, with some only available on a second playthrough. One gag involves the player collecting a power-up mushroom, only to become so giant that they die and lose a life. Another power-up gives Pole an erection. The game also features deliberate bugs and glitches such as slowdown and graphical corruption, while other gags spoof platforming game conventions such as the player being forced to control a limping Pole after he breaks his leg landing from a high platform.
