= Burning Rangers =

1998 video game

- European cover art
- Developer: Sonic Team
- Publisher: Sega
- Director: Naoto Ohshima
- Producer: Yuji Naka
- Designer: Takao Miyoshi
- Programmer: Takuya Matsumoto
- Artists: Naoto Ohshima; Hideaki Moriya; Kosei Kitamura
- Composers: Naofumi Hataya; Fumie Kumatani; Masaru Setsumaru
- Platform: Sega Saturn
- Release: JP: 26 February 1998; NA: 28 May 1998; EU: 19 June 1998
- Genres: Action, third-person shooter
- Mode: Single-player

Burning Rangers is a 1998 action game developed by Sonic Team and published by Sega for the Sega Saturn. Players control one of an elite group of firefighters, the Burning Rangers, who extinguish fires and rescue civilians in burning buildings in a futuristic society. Most tasks involve collecting energy crystals to transport civilians to safety. In lieu of an in-game map, Burning Rangers features a voice navigation system which directs players through corridors.

Development began shortly after the release of Christmas Nights in November 1996. Producer Yuji Naka wanted to create a game which involved saving people rather than killing them. Sonic Team used firefighting as they thought it was an effective way of having players identify with heroism.

Burning Rangers received mostly positive reviews. Critics praised the soundtrack and audio, particularly the voice navigation system. Some critics felt the graphics were among the best on the Saturn, but the collision detection and glitches were criticised. Burning Rangers was among the final five Saturn games released in America.

== Gameplay ==
In this screenshot, the player-character is extinguishing a fire. From left to right, the interface displays the time, number of crystals collected, health meter, danger meter, and water nozzle.

Burning Rangers is a third-person shooter game in which players complete missions involving extinguishing fires and rescuing civilians. The player completes tasks across four levels. The primary objective is to transport stranded civilians from burning buildings, by collecting energy crystals dropped from extinguished fires. A minimum of five crystals are needed to transport a civilian to safety; the player receives an energy shield if they use ten. The crystals function similarly to rings in Sonic the Hedgehog games: possessing at least one crystal allows a player to survive damage from an enemy or fire. Being hit once scatters the player's crystals and renders them vulnerable to death.

Every level is an interior space, and consists of multi-storied rooms and corridors divided by interlocking lifts and doors. The player is equipped with a jet pack to reach higher areas and perform acrobatic maneuvers such as backflips and rolls. They can also swim and dive underwater. Robots attack the player with shooting flames should they come into contact. Each stage ends with a boss battle, ranging from fire-breathing flowers to robotic fish. As in many Sonic Team games, upon completion of a stage players are graded on their performance.

Since there is no in-game map, the player character relies on a voice navigation system to find their way. The mission controller gives the player directions depending on their location, which can be repeated at any time. At the end of each stage, the player receives a rank based on their score and success at putting out fires, with "S" the highest and "D" the lowest. Once the game is completed, a random generator mode is unlocked which mixes up the order of corridors, with a potential total of 3,125 unique routes.

== Story ==
Burning Rangers is set in a futuristic society where the only threat to human life is fire. A team of firefighters called Burning Rangers are dispatched to emergency incidents to fight fires and rescue people in danger. The player is given the choice of two playable characters, Shou Amabane and Tillis. The selected character is introduced to the other members of the team, Chris Parton, Reed Phoenix, Big Landman and the non-selected playable character, before being taken on missions. The missions take place in a power plant, underwater habitat, space station and spaceship in zero gravity, respectively. During the final mission, the Rangers are introduced to Iria Klein, a girl placed in suspended animation and sent into space after contracting an incurable disease. Iria informs the Rangers her ship is set to crash into Earth, causing complete devastation, so the Rangers devise a plan to stop the ship and rescue Iria. Shou and Tillis become fully fledged Rangers, and Iria is cured of her disease and settles into her new life on Earth as a member of the Burning Rangers.

== Development ==
=== Concept and planning ===
We wanted to create a game where you could rescue people. Nowadays, there are so many games where you just kill people. Instead we decided to make a rescue game.

— Yuji Naka in an interview with Sega Saturn Magazine

Development of Burning Rangers started around November 1996, after the release of Sonic Team's previous game Christmas Nights (a Christmas-themed demo for Nights into Dreams). The development team of 31 (out of Sonic Team's staff of about 50) was directed by Naoto Ohshima and lead designer Takao Miyoshi. The rest of the team consisted of three game planners, six programmers, eighteen designers, and two sound producers, most of whom had worked on Nights into Dreams. In addition to the Sonic Team staff, Sega allotted a full consumer software team to the project.

The concept originated with the idea of rescuing people as opposed to killing them, which was an element that producer Yuji Naka felt was too common in contemporary video games. The team chose firefighters as they felt that fire was the most appropriate way to create fear and tension. In a retrospective interview, Ohshima said that many of the things done by firefighters—along with rescuing people—were "the very essence of a Sonic Team game", and that they recognised that a firefighter was a hero with whom people could identify. The team wanted to make a game with a rescue theme as Naka thought there were few games based on that concept. According to Takeo Miyoshi, "Our first inspiration came from the explosion and building destruction scenes of Hollywood movies. We just wanted to describe the heroism of lifesaving in that loud, explosive type of setting." The developers wanted to design a future that was "clean and beautiful", with sustainable energy, but where disasters still could occur, and only heroes could protect people from them. The designers envisioned that a futuristic firefighter would be acrobatic and dexterous to reach places where people were trapped.

According to Miyoshi, Burning Rangers was conceived as an online game for four players, but became a single-player game when the team faced network problems; Sonic Team revisited the concept with the Dreamcast game Phantasy Star Online (2000). An offline two-player mode was also attempted; a pre-production copy near the end of development allowed two players to battle each other in a large arena, although bugs made it impossible to play this mode for anything but short stretches. Although the target audience of Burning Rangers was people who enjoyed action games, the developers also wanted to attract fans of other Sonic Team games. Ohshima stressed that he was aiming at a wider audience and not the type of person who only played Sonic the Hedgehog, adding that "players should recognise the Sonic Team touch immediately" with Burning Rangers. The working title was Firefighter, but it was dropped as the team wanted a "cooler" sounding name. Naka felt that "burning" had a "go for it!" connotation in Japanese, and fit with the disaster-rescue theme. He was initially unsure about having "ranger" in the title as he felt that a ranger referred to park rangers in western culture. The team thought that the image of a "ranger" also brought to mind the Power Rangers franchise, and after consulting speakers of other languages, the name Burning Rangers was chosen.

=== Design ===
During the early stages of development, some members of Sonic Team visited Hong Kong shortly before the transfer of British sovereignty, in hopes of finding inspiration for the stages. Some staff also travelled to Universal Studios in California to experience the Backdraft attraction to learn how to generate a similar sensation. The team also visited a special firefighting event in Tokyo where they witnessed robots putting out fires, and were surprised to see how it compared to their image of the futuristic setting. Naka recalled that the robot had special infrared sensors and a camera which could see through fires, and was impressed by their techniques. According to Naka, the team did not ask for advice from professional firefighters during development, partly due to the concern that their game would not be well received, as Naka thought they would have said that real firefighting "wasn't that simple". At the Tokyo Games Show, a real firefighter, however, did comment that the character's costumes were too thin. Naka reflected that if they had made any of game elements highly realistic, the contrast between those elements and the clearly fictional elements would have been exaggerated.

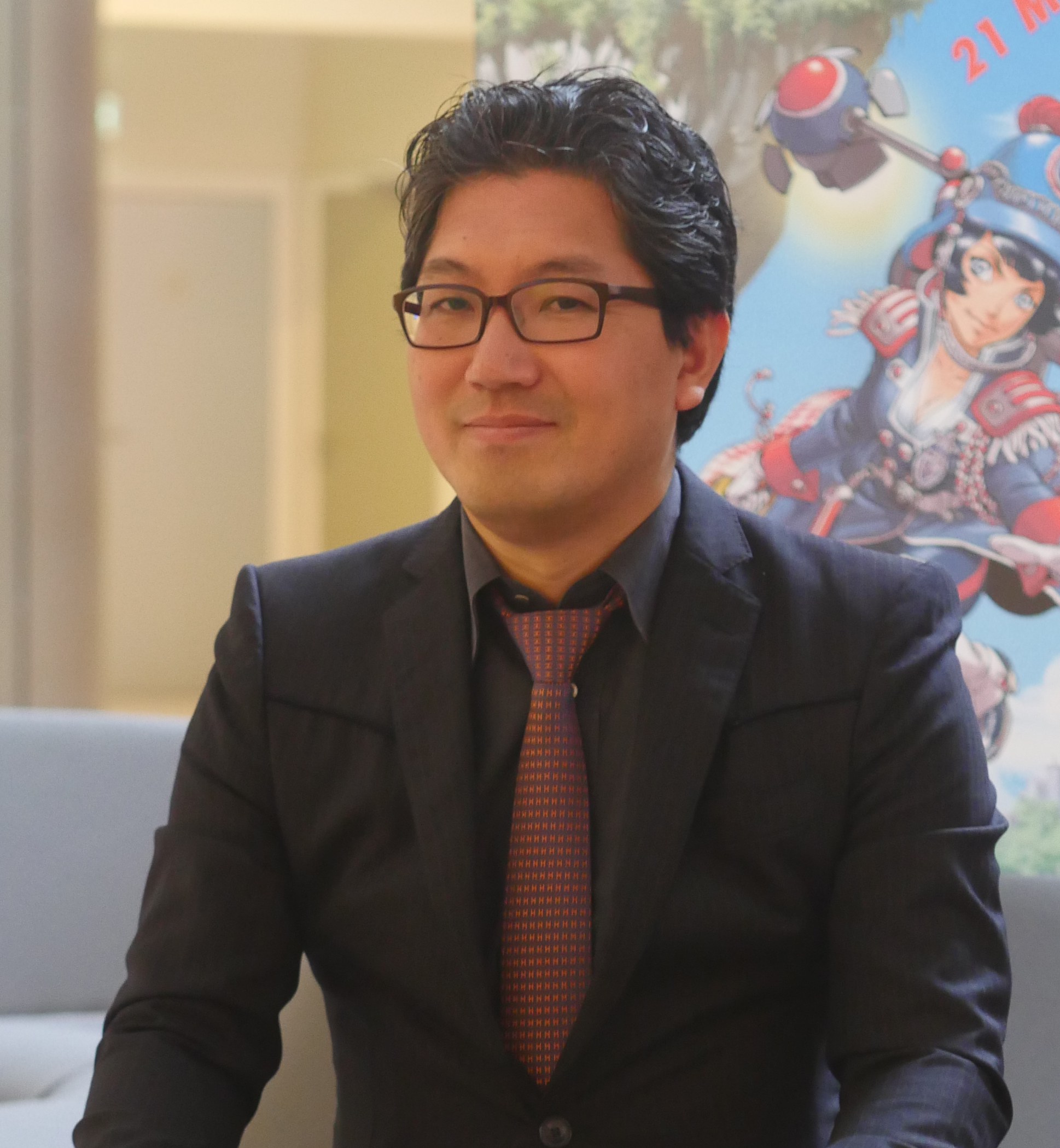
Yuji Naka, the producer, pictured in 2015

Burning Rangers uses the same engine as Nights into Dreams. When Sonic Team developed Nights into Dreams, they were new to programming for the Sega Saturn, and when the engine was re-used for Burning Rangers they were able to make it faster and more capable. To design the stages and environments, Miyoshi outlined the corridors first, then placed fires in them before adding light effects to simulate the appearance of fire. Miyoshi thought that the team had over-reached in designing the detailed stages, saying, "Everyone in the team wanted to put so much into the game that we only completed about half of what we wanted to do." Naka said that although they designed only four stages, they ensured that the player's experience would increase progressively because each stage was large. The developers initially used motion capture technology to capture data for poses and animation, but Naka soon discovered that it was impossible to get the results the team wanted, as it was unfeasible for people to perform the special motions they needed. The developers resorted to creating the animation by hand, and only used the motion capture data for the player characters' walking animations.

There were many difficulties in developing the voice navigation system, as no verbal dialogue had featured in a Sonic Team game before. Naka asserted the team had rethought all ideas of what should be included during development, and the idea of not including any on-screen maps but rather relying on a voice navigation system was "there from the start". The team tested different forms of navigation systems and picked the best. Although previous Saturn games which used voice navigation systems (e.g. Solar Eclipse) did so in conjunction with background music, they felt that background music would detract from the sensation of being present in the game. Miyoshi thought that the only audio accompaniment being the sound effects of fire and walls creaking would produce immersion.

The team originally wanted to record the dialog in six languages, but found the volume of work too difficult, reverting to English and Japanese instead. Before selecting voice actors, Miyoshi designed the characters and built up a mental image of what they would sound like. The Japanese voices were provided by Hikaru Midorikawa (Shou Amabane), Yūko Miyamura (Tillis), Hiroko Kasahara (Chris Parton), Tomokazu Seki (Lead Phoenix), Ryūzaburō Ōtomo (Big Landman), Toshihiko Nakajima, Takehiro Murozono, Yukiko Iwai (additional voices), and Aya Hisakawa (Ilia Klein). For the English version, Sonic Team hired several voice actors who had appeared in American television programs, including Benny Grant (Shou Amabane), Janna Levenstein (Tillis), Yvette Lowenthal (Chris Parton), Michael McGaharn (Lead Phoenix), Roger Rose (Big Landman), Carolyn Lawrence (Ilia Klein), Michael Reisz (Commander and Victims), Jeannie Elias (Victims), and Kimberly Brooks (Victims). Because the professional voice actor work was not recorded in time for the Tokyo Games Show, the Sonic Team staff did the voice acting themselves for the version demonstrated at the show. According to Miyoshi, all audio work was re-written several times throughout development; he considered it to have "evolved" alongside the production of the game itself.

We made a specific point of developing the game's sound—particularly the voice acting—and the audio navigation system in such a way that we could fully convey the sense of being in a 3D space, and of being caught up in a dramatic scenario.

— Takao Miyoshi in an interview with GamesTM

Designing the fire effects proved difficult due to the Saturn's rendering limitations. Miyoshi explained that during testing stages, the team spent time checking how well they would be able to create fires, a pivotal aspect. In the first test ROM they produced, Miyoshi discovered that they were able to achieve "some quite beautiful" fire effects by disguising blocky sprites with various degrees of transparency and lighting effects. At the time, few games used polygons in 3D spaces for acrobatic and exploration-orientated gameplay.

The animated cutscenes were produced by TMS Entertainment and its subsidiary, Seoul Movie, who had also produced the Virtua Fighter anime and the Man of the Year short on Sonic Jam for Sega, as well as cinematic feature films such as Akira and Little Nemo: Adventures in Slumberland. TMS has produced content for Sega since it was subsidised as TMS-Kyokuchi. The cutscenes were made with a digital process rather than traditional ink and paint, as this made them easier to compress onto a CD-ROM.

According to Miyoshi, the entire development spanned around a year and a half, although the programming took less than a year. Each of the main developers reflected on what they were proudest of: Naka expressed relief that Sonic Team were able to "get a good overall balance", whereas Miyoshi thought that the voice navigation system was the strongest aspect. Main programmer Takuya Matsumoto was delighted to see it released before the Saturn's discontinuation, saying "the fact that we've been able to push the Saturn this far is enough for me to die happy".

Sega of Japan planned Burning Rangers to be the headliner of their 1997 Christmas season releases, but a series of technical struggles led Sonic Team to delay the Japanese release until January 13, 1998 so that they could make changes to the visuals and gameplay. It was released exactly nine months before the Japanese release of Sega's next console, the Dreamcast. Burning Rangers was among the final five Saturn games released in America. Sega in fact planned for it to be the final Saturn game released in America, but the third-party game Magic Knight Rayearth came out later. IGN's Levi Buchanan characterized the release as an example of the Saturn's "ignominious send-off", writing that "sunset Saturn games like Panzer Dragoon Saga and Burning Rangers demanded far better launches. The way these games were slipped into retail with zero fanfare and low circulation was insulting to both hard-working developers and Sega fans."

== Reception ==
Reception

Aggregate score
Aggregator	Score
GameRankings	75%

Review scores
Publication	Score
AllGame	4/5
CNET Gamecenter	8/10
Computer and Video Games	4/5
Edge	8/10
Electronic Gaming Monthly	7.5/10, 7.5/10, 8.5/10, 6.5/10
Famitsu	32/40
Game Informer	7.25/10
GameFan	79% (Note: In GameFan's viewpoint of the game, three critics gave it each a score of 81, 73, and 83.)
GameSpot	6.2/10
HobbyConsolas	92%
IGN	8/10
Next Generation	4/5
Sega Saturn Magazine (UK)	90%
Sega Saturn Magazine (Japan)	80%
GMR	8/10

Burning Rangers received favourable reviews. In Japan, Famitsu gave it a score of 32 out of 40.

Reviewers praised Burning Rangers' colourful lighting effects, but criticised its collision detection and occasional graphical glitching. Lee Nutter of the British Sega Saturn Magazine enjoyed the detailed characters and described the lighting effects as excellent, although he, along with IGN's Levi Buchanan, noticed that the visuals had minor problems. Sonia Herranz of HobbyConsolas and Ed Lomas of Computer and Video Games commended the character's designs, colourful lighting and detailed visuals, though Lomas declared that the graphics "[did] often look a mess".

The collision detection was unanimously criticised. Colin Williamson of AllGame felt that the prominent polygon errors were a problem, though he appreciated the attractive lighting effects. Some critics compared the visuals to those of Nights into Dreams. Ryan MacDonald of GameSpot commented that the Japanese import had a similar look and feel to that game's 3D environment, and that Burning Rangers' polygonal graphics were "some of the best [he had] ever seen". Mike Weigand of GamePro felt most of the stage designs were "drab", (Note: GamePro gave the game three 4/5 scores for graphics, sound, and fun factor, and 3.5/5 for control.) and in a retrospective review GMR's Dave Smith thought that it "looks like hell" and had not aged as well as Nights into Dreams, and that its engine could not handle a free-roaming environment without harming its visuals. Weigand felt the 3D environment was a mix of both Tomb Raider and Nights into Dreams.

The soundtrack and sound effects received praise, though reviewers recognised that the game lacked music to create tension. Buchanan appreciated that it contained a few tracks of "excellent" Sega-style music, with his favourite being the theme song. Although Williamson, Weigand, and Nutter noted the lack of in-game music, they lauded the vocal tracks, voice samples, and sound clues. Most reviewers questioned the quality of the dialogue. Weigand felt it was "lame", and Smith said it was "some of the worst voice acting ever produced by human lungs". Herranz had difficulty understanding crucial dialogue since the audio was only recorded in English, although she admitted that the voice guidance system was an innovative element. Williamson praised Sega's decision to produce full voiced dialogue as opposed to subtitling original Japanese dialogue, and also praised its "good-to-excellent" English voice acting, though it was "no Shakespeare".

Reviewers had mixed opinions on the control scheme and use of the Saturn 3D controller. Nutter noted that the controls were a mix of those featured in Tomb Raider and Nights into Dreams, praising the use of the analogue stick to perform complex manoeuvres. A reviewer from the Japanese Sega Saturn Magazine felt it was more comfortable with an analogue pad as opposed to the default Saturn controller, and Williamson similarly thought the control scheme was "great" when used with an analogue pad. In contrast, Weigand criticised the lack of a custom configuration and described the controls as "squirrelly", even with the analogue controller. Two reviewers criticised the short length and lack of difficulty. Nutter suggested that accomplished players would have it "clocked" in a couple of days and felt it did not take much effort to complete the four levels, whilst Buchanan said it was "too short for its own good", a problem made worse by its enjoyable gameplay.
