= Phantasy Star Online =

2000 video game

- Japanese Dreamcast cover art
- Developer: Sonic Team
- Publisher: Sega
- Director: Takao Miyoshi
- Producer: Yuji Naka
- Programmer: Akio Setsumasa
- Artist: Satoshi Sakai
- Writer: Akinori Nishiyama
- Composers: Hideaki Kobayashi; Fumie Kumatani
- Series: Phantasy Star
- Platforms: Dreamcast; Windows; GameCube; Xbox
- Release: December 21, 2000: Dreamcast; JP: December 21, 2000; NA: January 30, 2001; EU: February 15, 2001 Ver.2; JP: June 7, 2001; NA: September 25, 2001; EU: March 1, 2002 Windows; JP: December 20, 2001 GameCube; JP: September 12, 2002; NA: October 30, 2002; EU: March 7, 2003 Xbox; JP: January 16, 2003; NA: April 15, 2003; EU: May 23, 2003
- Genre: Action role-playing
- Modes: Single-player, multiplayer

Phantasy Star Online is an online role-playing game (RPG) developed by Sonic Team and published by Sega in 2000 for the Dreamcast. Players adventure with up to three others over the internet to complete quests, collect items and fight enemies in real-time action RPG combat. The story is unrelated to previous games in the Phantasy Star series.

Phantasy Star Online was the first successful online RPG for game consoles. Earlier online gaming was limited to western Windows games, particularly RPGs such as Diablo, Ultima Online and EverQuest. Believing online play was the future, Sega chairman Isao Okawa instructed Sonic Team to develop an online game for the Dreamcast, produced by Yuji Naka. Sonic Team's experiments led to the development of ChuChu Rocket!, the first online Dreamcast game. Using what they learned from the project, and taking significant inspiration from Diablo, Sonic Team built Phantasy Star Online. As Japanese internet service providers charged for dial-up access per minute, and high-speed connections were not yet widely available, Okawa personally paid for free internet access bundled with Japanese Dreamcasts.

Phantasy Star Online was highly anticipated and launched to positive reviews and commercial success; critics praised the online gameplay as addictive but criticized the single-player mode. It received the Japan Game Award for "Game of the Year" and is recognized as a landmark console game, influencing multiplayer dungeon crawlers, as well as the Monster Hunter series.

Phantasy Star Online was ported to Windows and rereleased on the Dreamcast as Ver. 2 with expanded content. Following Sega's exit from the console business in 2001, the game was ported to GameCube and Xbox as Episode I & II, featuring new characters, environments and other features. Episode III: C.A.R.D. Revolution, released for GameCube in 2003, was a turn-based card game. The online series continued with Phantasy Star Universe (2006) and Phantasy Star Online 2 (2012). Although Sega decommissioned the last official servers in 2010, Phantasy Star Online is still played on private servers.

== Gameplay ==
A player battling enemies in the forests of Ragol with three other players

Phantasy Star Online is an action role-playing game primarily played with other players cooperatively over the internet. Players take on the role of adventurers sent to explore Ragol, an uncharted planet. To create their character, they choose between a handful of races and classes, which define their abilities and statistics; for example, some types are better with "techniques" (magic spells) while others are more skilled with ranged or melee weapons.

Players can play either online or offline. Online, players are brought to a lobby where they can chat and organize teams of up to four. (Note: The high player population in this part of the game has led some sources to label the game as a massively multiplayer online role-playing game (MMORPG). However, other sources have explained that the main portions of the game are not massively multiplayer, only the lobbies.) Team members can communicate by typing using a physical or onscreen keyboard, even when in different environments. Preset phrases are automatically translated between languages, and custom emoticons are also supported. Players can also exchange "guild cards" to exchange private messages and see when the other is online.

After organizing a team, players are transported to their own instance of the hub spaceship Pioneer 2, where they can buy and sell items, store money and items, heal, and browse quests. At any time, they can transport to Ragol, where combat and exploration take place. The four environments – forests, caves, mines, or ruins – comprise winding passages and large areas where enemies spawn. Players fight enemies in real time, using weapons and techniques and collecting items. Attacks can be chained for more accuracy and speed. Typically, all the monsters in a room must be defeated to advance. Each environment ends in a boss battle, which rewards the team with a large sum of experience points. Quests, taken on Pioneer 2, task players with specific challenges; once completed, the team returns to Pioneer 2 to collect their reward. Higher difficulties reward players with more experience points and better items. Some items can be used to feed the player's mag, a small creature that follows the player character and aids them in battle.

== Plot ==
The story of Phantasy Star Online is unrelated to the original Phantasy Star series and is less substantial. Threatened by the imminent destruction of their home planet, thousands of refugees arrive at planet Ragol aboard the spaceship Pioneer 2. As they establish contact with colonists sent ahead on Pioneer 1, an enormous explosion shakes the planet. Adventurers from Pioneer 2 land to investigate the explosion and search for Rico Tyrell, daughter of the head of Pioneer 2. They discover the planet overrun by monsters, and follow messages left by Rico leading to an ancient evil, Dark Falz.

== Development ==
By the late 1990s, the popularity of online gaming on personal computers had grown substantially in the West, but was almost nonexistent in Japan, where consoles were more popular. Sega chairman Isao Okawa believed the internet was the future of gaming and wanted a flagship online game for Sega's Dreamcast console. None of Sega's development studios wanted the project, as they were occupied with their own ventures, such as Jet Set Radio (2000) and the Sakura Wars series. Okawa gave the responsibility to Sonic Team, led by Yuji Naka. Sonic Team was not particularly receptive to the decision, but continued with development. After Okawa became ill, Naka sent reports to the hospital to update him on progress.

=== Concept ===
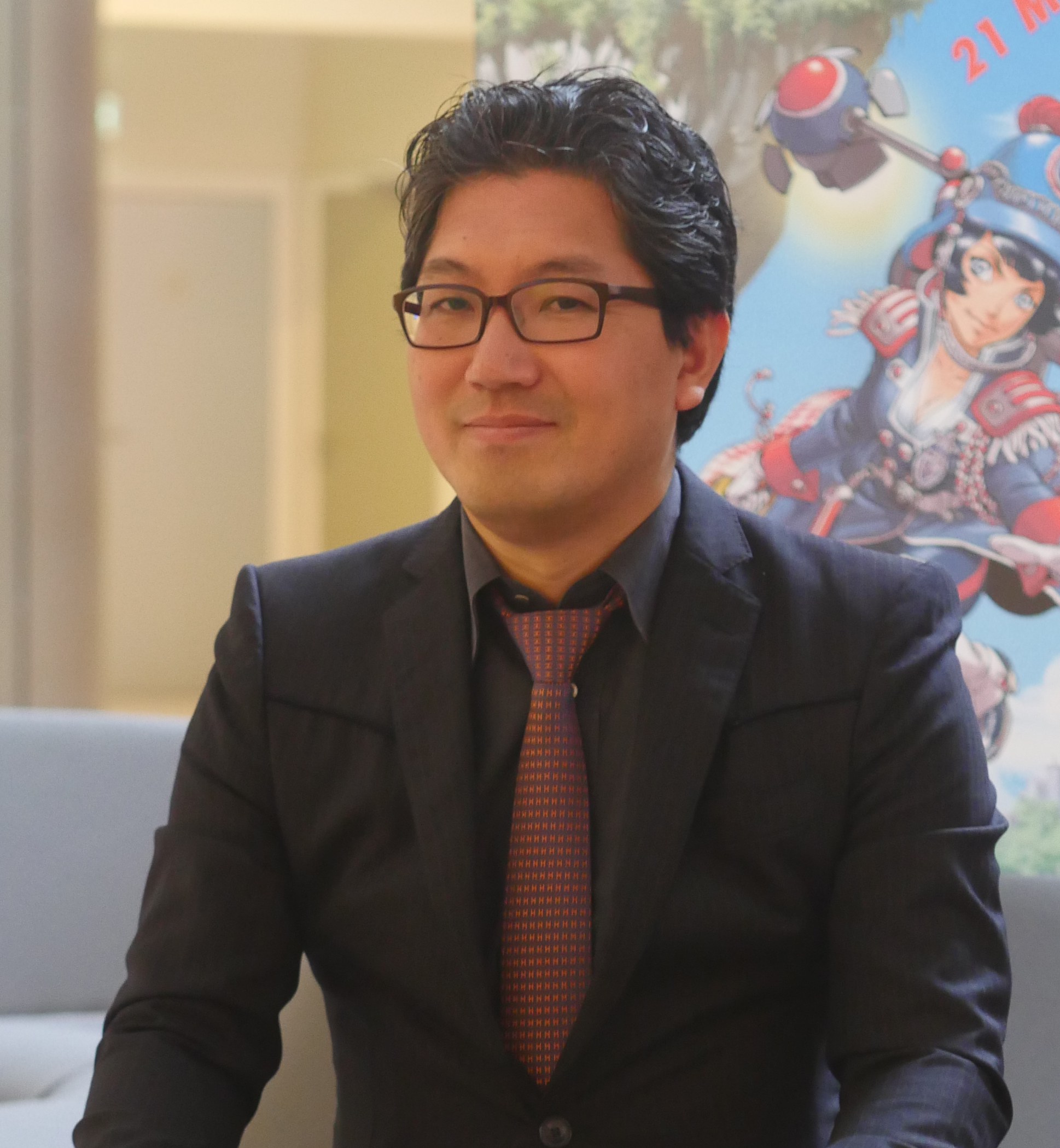
Producer Yuji Naka in 2015

Sonic Team began experimenting with the Dreamcast's network capabilities after completing Sonic Adventure in 1998. They saw the creation of an online game for Japan, a nation of console gamers, as a serious challenge, akin to creating a new genre. Much of their time was spent learning the basic elements of online gaming; they wanted to make sure the network functionality worked before developing the gameplay, setting, and story. Their network experiments became ChuChu Rocket!, released in 1999 as the first online game for the Dreamcast. Sonic Team used the lessons learned from ChuChu Rocket! to implement network technology in the larger project.

Because of the lack of Japanese online games, and the developers' experience with the genre, Naka looked to western games for inspiration, and studied three online RPGs popular at the time: Diablo (1996), Ultima Online (1997), and EverQuest (1999). Diablo in particular impressed him on a gameplay and technical level; he enjoyed how smooth the graphics and action were despite requiring significant system memory. Diablo was a 2D game, however, and Sonic Team wanted to develop a 3D game with the same degree of smoothness and gameplay. This concerned Naka, as he did not want his game to use the cheap and bland graphics associated with online games.

Naka decided against creating a massively multiplayer game similar to Ultima Online and EverQuest, which would handle many players simultaneously in a persistent world; the necessary servers would have required two years of programming, and the Dreamcast did not have a hard disk drive to support continuous online patches. Naka was also more interested in working on new projects instead of continuously updating the same game for years, and doubted Sonic Team would be able to keep the game interesting. The team therefore adopted Diablo as their main inspiration, determined to outclass it.

=== Art and setting ===
Sonic Team built a science fiction-fantasy game under the working title Third World. The art style was "comic-like" at first, but became more realistic. One of artist Satoshi Sakai's early concept drawings of a dragon reminded Naka of Sega's Phantasy Star series, which had been dormant since Phantasy Star IV (1993) for the Genesis. Naka had been the main programmer on Phantasy Star (1987) and Phantasy Star II (1989). He had always wanted to develop a multiplayer Phantasy Star game, but previous hardware did not allow for it.

The team was given freedom not to adhere strictly to elements from earlier Phantasy Star games. Naka felt liberated by the decision to not continue the story from the previous Phantasy Star games. Since few of the Phantasy Star IV staff still worked at Sega, the art team felt little obligation to adhere to the previous games' style, retaining only the science fiction look and some enemy and item names. Naka and Sakai believed factors such as the change in graphical fidelity and genre were enough to differentiate it from previous Phantasy Star games.

=== Music ===
The soundtrack was composed by Hideaki Kobayashi using a Roland JV-2080 synthesizer, with live orchestration on some tracks, including the theme song. Kobayashi composed ambient music for calm scenes, and incorporated more rhythm and melody for battles. He composed short four-bar melodies that are sequenced depending on gameplay; for example, when an enemy appears, the system plays music associated with that enemy. The process was a drain on the Dreamcast hardware, and gained the nickname "the crasher" among staff for how often it would crash the game during development.

=== Online functionality ===
Sonic Team had conceived their 1998 Saturn game Burning Rangers as an online game for four players, but abandoned the idea due to insurmountable network problems. They used the ChuChu Rocket! networking system as a template for the online functions for Phantasy Star Online. This presented new challenges, as the new network would connect players between different countries. Sonic Team ran experiments with different internet service providers, dial-up modems, cable modems, and other networking configurations to ensure the game would work for all players. In Japan, Sonic Team gave beta versions to 10,000 users who pre-ordered the game, so they could work with a variety of equipment and internet services to eliminate problems. They wanted to run a worldwide test but did not have time. 90% of the testers were able to play online. Despite technical success, Sega was concerned that the high cost of internet access in Japan would be prohibitive for gamers and reduce sales. Japanese internet service providers charged per-minute fees for dial-up access, and high-speed options such as broadband were not yet widely available. To combat this, chairman Okawa personally paid for free internet access for one year to be bundled with each Dreamcast.

One of the biggest challenges was bridging the language barrier between global players. Sonic Team felt that developing a universal language system would be the largest barrier to a global gaming network. The team started by developing the word select system, which allows players to select predefined expressions to be translated to other players. The system had about 2000 words near the end of development, and Naka found it difficult to add more words to satisfy all player needs. Sonic Team built support for Japanese, English, Spanish, German and French. They omitted Italian and Portuguese due to time constraints. Korean was also considered because of the internet boom in Korea at the time. Japanese and English were easier to implement because the only concern is the word order and do not use grammatical gender. The language system had to be fully redesigned at least once.

Each server could accommodate one thousand players. Sega initially prepared 20 network servers to accommodate 20,000 online users for the game's launch, with room to add more servers as necessary. This was increased to support up to 36,000 players right before launch. Sonic Team partnered with Swatch to use Swatch Internet time (or "beat time") as a universal clock for the game. The clock was implemented so players could coordinate with those in other countries on when to play online. The clock system divides each 24 hours into 1,000 beats, with one beat equaling one minute and 26.4 seconds. The time was maintained directly on the server and not based on the user's clock on their system. Sonic Team decided not to add jumping to keep the levels simple and simplify the network code.

Naka joked that future gamers would laugh at the word "Online" in the title, as he believed that online gaming would become standard; it was included as the concept was new and so important to communicate.

=== End of production ===
Phantasy Star Online was planned for release in March 2000, but was delayed so more features could be added. The team planned 18 character types, and had male and female sketches for each, but settled on nine. A player-versus-player mode was included in beta versions given to journalists, but this was omitted in the final version because it distracted players from the cooperative focus and introduced game balance issues; additionally, as the console-playing audience was younger than the PC audience, Naka did not want to evoke competitive behavior. The development team had more ideas for features to implement as development came to a close, with Naka wishing he had six additional months to add more features. Phantasy Star Online took two years to develop. Naka found it difficult to make a networked game for consoles, and developed an appreciation for Microsoft for supporting online games so well.

== Promotion ==
"As one of the most anticipated games for RPG fans and Dreamcast owners alike, Sonic Team's Phantasy Star Online represents what could be the pinnacle of current next-generation gaming, roleplaying or otherwise."

— Official Dreamcast Magazine (US), December 2000

Sega unveiled Phantasy Star Online at the 1999 Tokyo Game Show with a gameplay demonstration. Naka called it the "killer app" for the Dreamcast as it used all aspects of the system, most importantly the modem.

As one of the first online RPGs for consoles, Phantasy Star Online was highly anticipated. Journalists saw it as the next evolutionary step in console-based role-playing games. Francesca Reyes of Official Dreamcast Magazine proposed that it would be an "industry-changing title", a landmark in the history of console gaming. Computer and Video Games wrote that the Dreamcast was quickly becoming the platform for innovative games, and wrote that Phantasy Star Online was "arguably the most revolutionary - not the mention most ambitious - console game ever". GameSpot believed it would "change the way we think of RPGs" and could possibly be "the most exciting console RPG ever created". Edge wrote that the multiplayer mechanics "would lay the foundations for a new era of console gaming". Video Gamer called it the "Dreamcast's most ambitious project yet". Some journalists had concerns about the viability of the online modes, and saw the single-player option as a fail-safe should it not function correctly.

To promote the game, Sega bought a star on the International Star Registry and named it "Ragol". The first 100,000 people to pre-order the game in Japan received Phantasy Star Online branded dog tags. A limited edition in Japan including a branded memory card was canceled and the memory card sold separately on Sega's website. Early copies of the game included a demo for Sonic Adventure 2.

== Launch ==
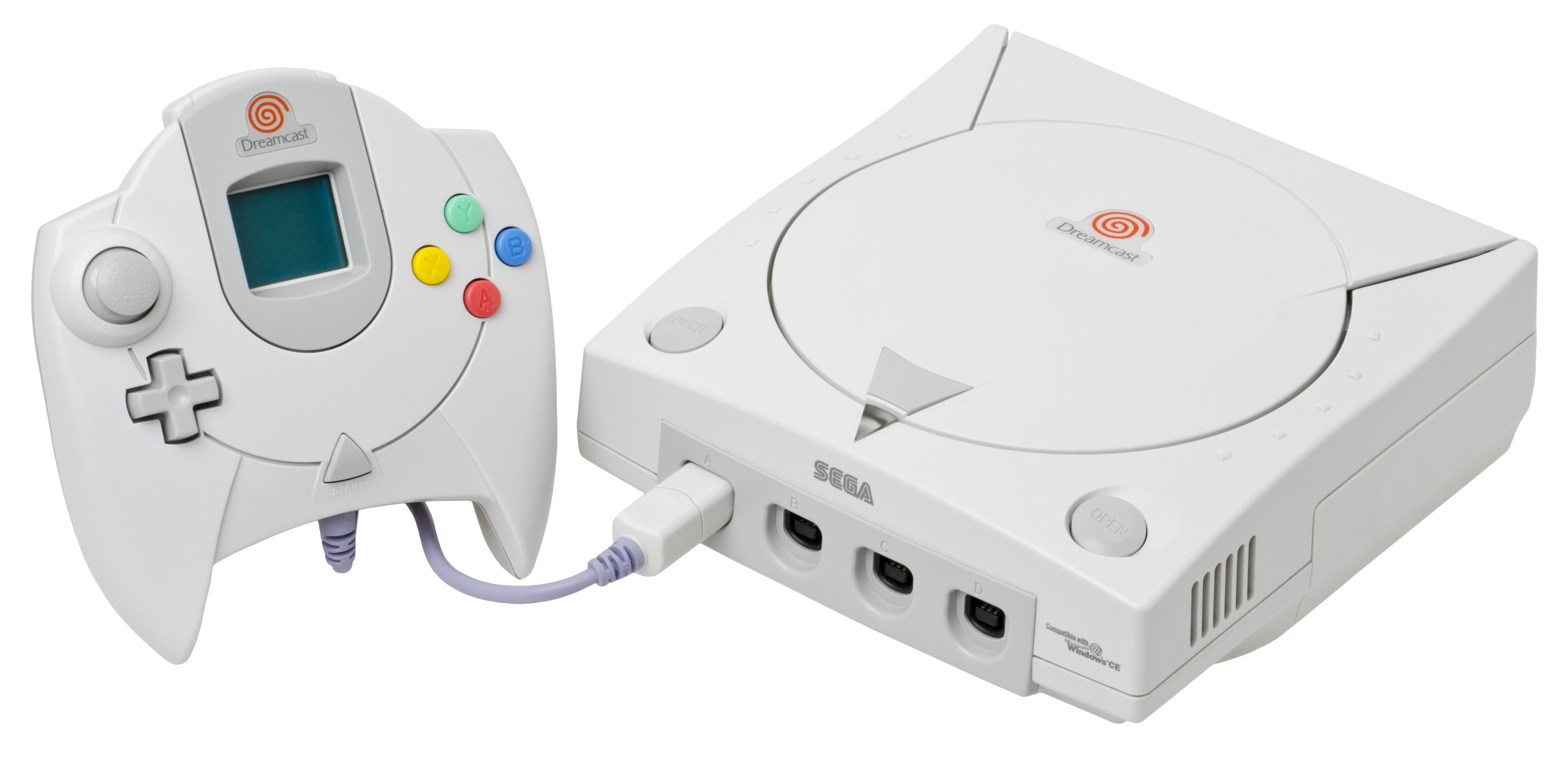
Phantasy Star Online was first released for the Dreamcast.

Phantasy Star Online was released in Japan on December 21, 2000. The language could be changed to English or any of the other supported chat languages, making it "import-friendly". Naka had hoped for a simultaneous global release, but the western release was delayed for beta testing and marketing reasons. While subscriptions would be free in North America, in Japan the game included a 30-day free trial, after which Japanese players were required to purchase 30-day or 90-day subscriptions. Immediately after the Japanese release, Sonic Team began maintaining the overworked servers and investigated network problems in Hiroshima and Okayama.

Sonic Team hoped that Phantasy Star Online would be successful in Japan; international sales were seen as a bonus. In North America, which Naka believed would be the biggest market, Phantasy Star Online was released on January 30, 2001. It sold 75,000 copies there on the first day and was the bestselling game that week. Sega's North American online gaming service SegaNet was not required for online play. While the Japanese version supported the modem and broadband adapters, the North American release did not support the broadband adapter, but IGN explained how to use it by swapping discs with an import copy.

Sega expected to sell 500,000 copies in Japan and one million worldwide as of October 2000. Naka had hoped to sell more, but believed the servers may not have carried the load. Before its western launch, nearly 100,000 players had registered. By April 2001, over 235,000 players had registered worldwide: 130,000 in Japan, 70,000 in North America, and 35,000 in Europe. By May, over 270,000 had registered. The peak number of users connected simultaneously was 26,000.

Phantasy Star Online suffered problems common with other online games, with players cheating and selling rare items online. Several weeks after launch, Japanese players began exploiting bugs to duplicate items, enhance their stats, and kill other players. Sonic Team announced they would ban players found cheating or disrupting other players, starting in May 2001. According to IGN, cheating was prevalent because Phantasy Star Online used a peer-to-peer communication system. Blizzard Entertainment had similar problems with Diablo, but after moving to a client-server system for Diablo II, cheating became more difficult.

Sonic Team added more quests for players to download, translated into the five languages used in the game. In Japan, a special "Fan Cup" quest was held from March 23 to April 6, developed with the game magazine Famitsu. In the event, over 70,000 players competed for the fastest time; the winner received a cash prize and a rare game item. As he had with ChuChu Rocket!, Naka played online and was happy to see American and Japanese players playing together using the communication system.

== Later releases ==
=== Ver. 2 ===
In April 2001, Sega announced Phantasy Star Online Ver. 2, an updated version with new content and improved features, including an increased level cap (to 200), a new difficulty mode for players over level 80, a battle mode that pits players in one-on-one or team battles, a soccer minigame with balls shaped like characters from ChuChu Rocket!, new weapons and monsters, gameplay balance alterations, day and night effects, an improved user interface, and two new areas exclusive to online quests. Ver. 2 also adds a challenge mode, which places teams in a stage with starting equipment and stats; if a teammate dies, the mission ends. Players could import their character from the original game or create a new one; characters registered for Ver. 2 could not be used in the original game. Any illegal items were also deleted during the upgrade.

Sonic Team worked a tough schedule to develop Ver. 2 in under six months, releasing it on June 7, 2001, in Japan and September 25, 2001, in North America. Unlike the original North American release, Ver. 2 required subscription fees to play. Three months of unlimited gameplay could be purchased at a time. The game still had no dependencies on SegaNet, however. In Europe, DreamKey 3.0 was required. Ver. 2 was ported to Windows in Japan and released on December 20, 2001.

=== Episode I & II ===
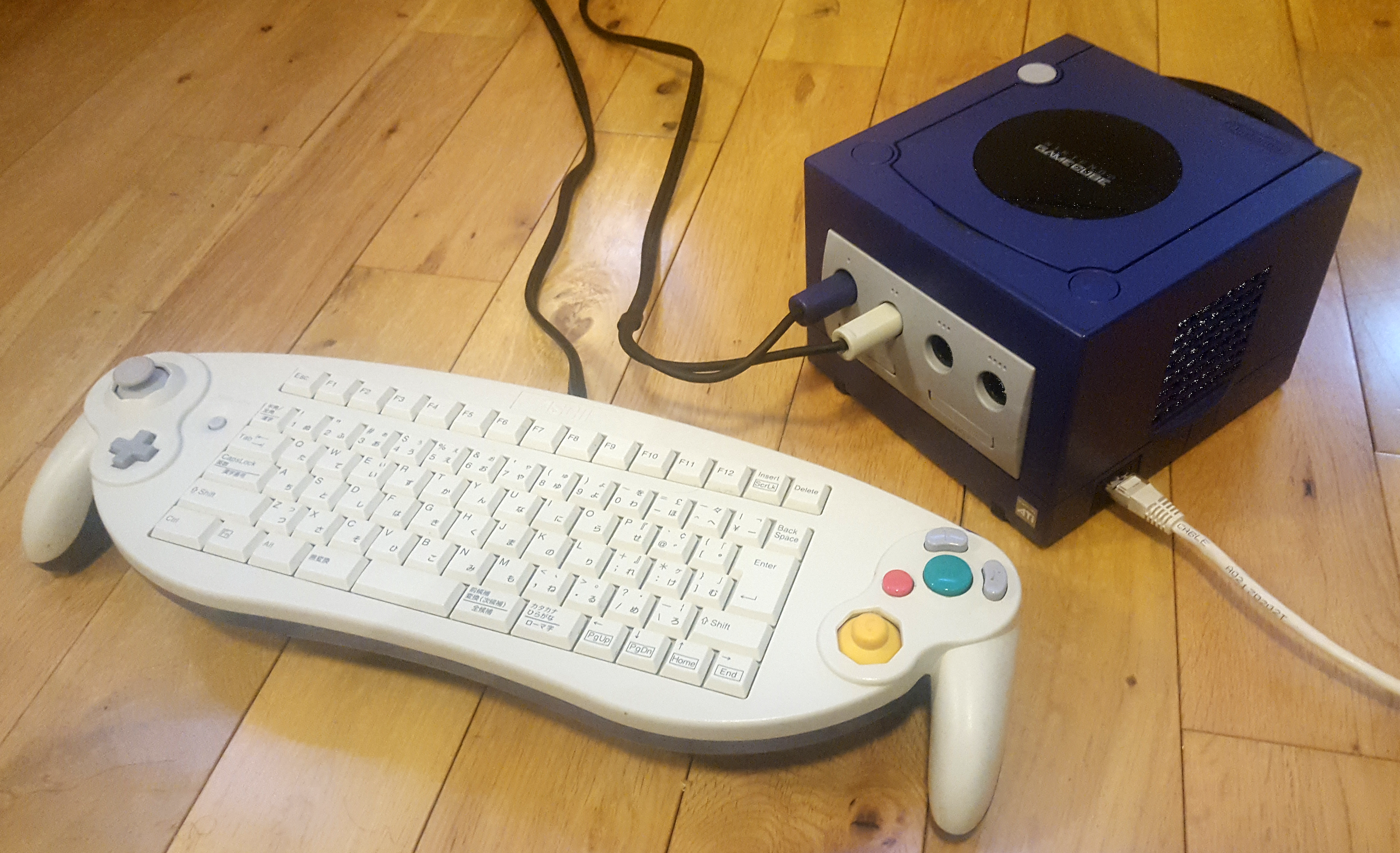
ASCII Corporation produced a unique GameCube controller with a keyboard to help players communicate in Phantasy Star Online.

On January 31, 2001, following years of losses, Sega announced it would discontinue the Dreamcast and restructure as a third-party developer. In May, Sega announced an expanded GameCube port of Phantasy Star Online, which became Phantasy Star Online: Episode I & II. Sega chose the GameCube because it had similar architecture to the Dreamcast and supported dial-up, which Sega believed was important despite the approach of broadband internet. Sonic Team created a GameCube demo of Phantasy Star Online within a month.

To make the game more viable for Nintendo's family-oriented consumers, Sonic Team added a split-screen multiplayer mode. Since the GameCube had no out-of-the-box network capabilities, Nintendo developed a modem and broadband adapter and sold them separately. The servers were maintained by Sega. GameCube players could not play with Dreamcast players.

Phantasy Star Online: Episode I & II comprises two "episodes": Episode I is a port of Ver 2 with improved graphics, whereas Episode II comprises entirely new content, which Naka described as a true sequel. The game adds characters, environments, quests, a split-screen mode, and updated graphics and interfaces. Some quests reward players with minigames based on Sonic Team games ChuChu Rocket!, Puyo Pop and Nights into Dreams, which can be downloaded to a Game Boy Advance using the GameCube – Game Boy Advance link cable. A Chao resembling Tails, a character from the Sonic games, can be imported into Sonic Advance and Sonic Adventure 2: Battle.

Sonic Team ran a beta trial for some players who had pre-ordered Episode I & II, starting on May 31, 2002. The game sold 70,000 copies within the first month in Japan, and by October had sold over 100,000. It was released in North America in October, and in Europe on March 7, 2003. Like Ver. 2, Episode I & II required a paid monthly subscription. ASCII Corporation developed a keyboard controller for the game, released only in Japan, though plans were announced for a keyboard controller to be released in America. Some players resorted to importing the controller from Japan. An enhanced version of the game, Episode I & II Plus, was released for the GameCube later. This version included many quests originally distributed exclusively online, a new challenge mode, and new items.

Episode I & II was ported to Xbox on April 15, 2003. Servers were hosted through Xbox Live and did not interface with the GameCube or Dreamcast servers. Because of its Xbox Live foundation, the Xbox version supports voice chat but did not connect players across regions. The game required an Xbox Live account to play online or offline; as the game was packaged with Xbox Live in Japan, to localize the game quickly, Microsoft did not remove the limitation. In addition to Xbox Live fees, Sega charged players an extra subscription fee to play online.

=== Episode III: C.A.R.D. Revolution ===
In 2003, Sega announced Episode III: C.A.R.D. Revolution. The game is a sequel to the story presented in Episode I & II, but replaces the action RPG gameplay with a turn-based strategy card game; after developing Episode I & II, Sonic Team thought that players may want a new experience. Players of Episode I & II and Episode III can chat and interact in common lobbies, but cannot enter game instances together. The online servers for the game shut down at the same time as the GameCube Servers for Episode I & II.

=== Blue Burst ===
A new version for Windows, Phantasy Star Online Blue Burst, was released in Japan on July 15, 2004, following an open beta that began on May 22. It is a port of Episode I & II with another episode of new content. It features enhancements including a system allowing players to communicate across different servers; the most significant change is that the game is online-only, with user data stored on the servers, reducing cheating. In January 2005, Blue Burst was released in China, Sega's first online game there. It was released in beta in North America in May 2005, and fully in June.

=== Server closure ===
The North American Dreamcast servers operated until September 30, 2003. The North American and Japanese Dreamcast servers and North American GameCube servers were shut down on March 30, 2007, following a month of free service. The Japanese Xbox servers were shut down on January 31, 2008, and the North American servers followed on April 22, a week earlier than the announced date of April 30. The North American and European Blue Burst servers were shut down following a free period lasting from January 12, 2008, until the server's closing on March 31. This was followed by the shutdown of the Japanese Blue Burst servers on December 27, 2010, the last official Sega servers. Hobbyists have developed private servers; as such, the game retains a cult following and can still be played online for all platforms.

== Reception ==
Reception (original Dreamcast version)

Aggregate score
Aggregator	Score
Metacritic	89/100

Review scores
Publication	Score
Computer and Video Games	5/5
Edge	9/10
GameRevolution	B+
GameSpot	8.2/10
GameSpy	9.5/10
IGN	9.3/10
Next Generation	5/5
Consoles +	91%
Dreamcast Magazine (JP)	10/10 (Note: Three individual reviewers gave a perfect 10 score.)
Dream Planet	96%

Phantasy Star Online received "generally favorable" reviews per ratings aggregator Metacritic. Dreamcast Magazine (Japan) wrote that the cooperative play was an interesting shift from a trend in multiplayer games being mostly competitive. Edge agreed, writing that the variety of gameplay experiences shared with other players kept the game fresh. Spanish magazine Dream Planet and GameSpot praised how the players can take on different roles in the teams, such as a supporting healer or ranged attacker. IGN commended the extensive amount of equipment and items for eliciting friendly competition to collect them. The chat system was also praised for making communication easy, especially between players speaking different languages.

Critics agreed that the single-player mode was boring compared to the addictive online multiplayer. GameSpot and GameSpy wrote that it lacked life and became tedious and repetitive when played alone, and GameSpot advised players not to try the game unless they were planning to play online. Other common complaints included poor camera control, the lack of map and quest variety, and poor storyline. Despite the concerns, critics agreed that the fun had in online multiplayer overshadowed these problems. Edge wrote that the changes in gameplay experiences with different players replaced the variety that would normally be expected in the quest design. Critics also praised the freedom for players to design and equip characters and develop their own playing style. Computer and Video Games wrote that "PSO marks a step in a new direction for console adventures and there's so much right with the game that to even mention these faults doesn't quite feel in the spirit of what PSO represents".

Reviewing Ver. 2, Dreamcast Magazine (UK) felt that it would renew interest in the game for those that enjoyed it, but would not convert new players. GameSpot and IGN agreed, saying that the core gameplay remained the same, but the new features may be worthwhile for dedicated players, even with the new subscription costs. Reviewing Episode I & II, critics praised the split-screen mode, Game Boy Advance downloads, graphics improvements, and gameplay tweaks. GameSpot wrote that the new material in Episode II was not significant enough for veteran players to return, and criticized some practical issues with how split-screen multiplayer was handled. Eurogamer criticized the cost for a network adapter, subscription fees, and the "almost obligatory" keyboard. Several critics complained about the lack of a keyboard available in the Americas.

GameSpot named Phantasy Star Online the best Dreamcast game and eighth-best console game of 2001. It was a nominee for the publication's "Best Role-Playing Game" prize among console games, but lost to Final Fantasy X. During the 5th Annual Interactive Achievement Awards, the Academy of Interactive Arts & Sciences nominated Phantasy Star Online for the "Massive Multiplayer/Persistent World" award, which was ultimately given to Dark Age of Camelot. Episode I & II was a runner-up for GameSpot's 2002 "Best Role-Playing Game on GameCube" award, which ultimately went to Animal Crossing.

== Legacy ==
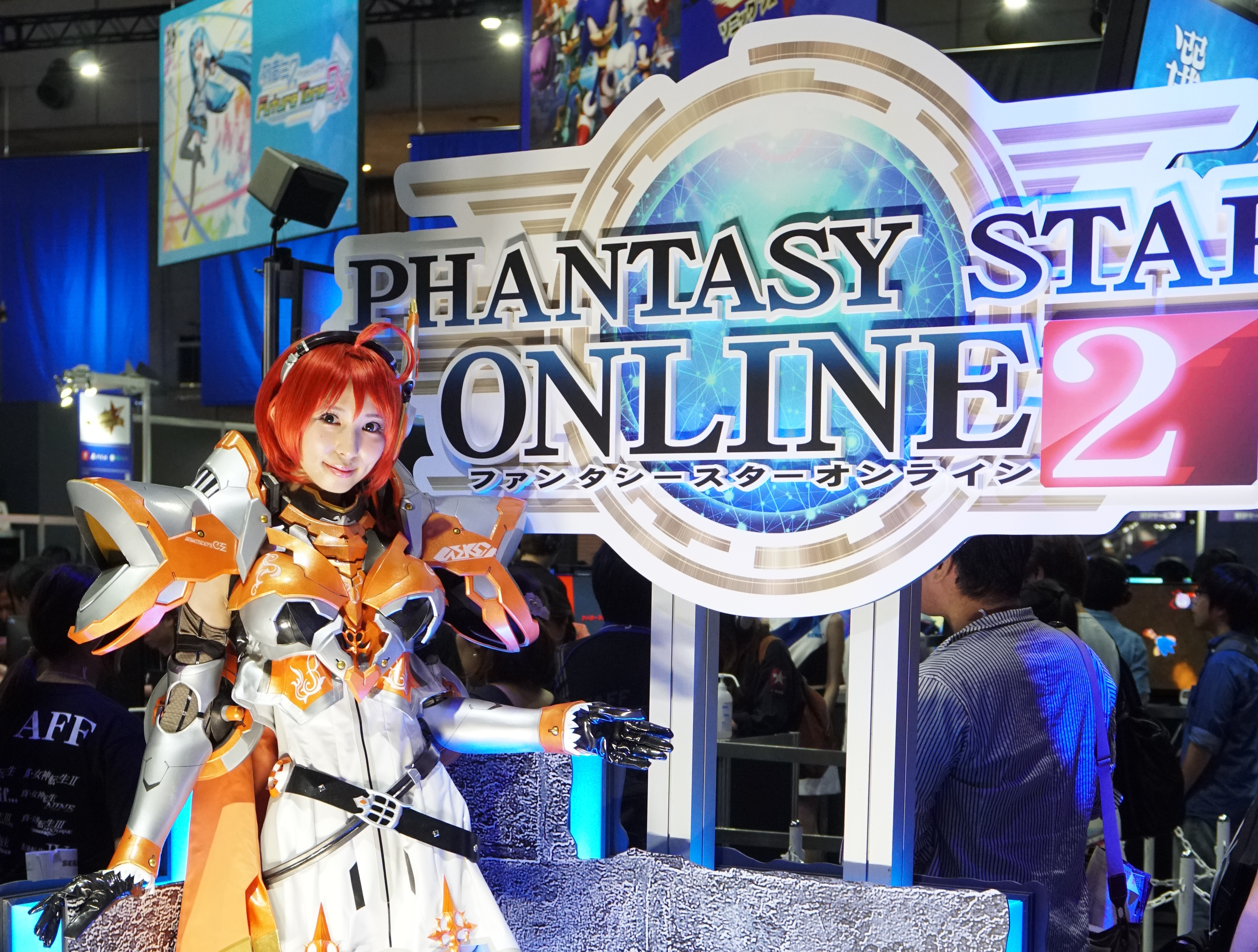
Promotion for Phantasy Star Online 2 at Tokyo Game Show 2017

As the first successful online role-playing game for home consoles, Phantasy Star Online is considered a landmark game. It won several awards, including Japan Game Award for "Game of the Year", awarded three days after the death of Sega chairman Okawa, over the likes of The Legend of Zelda: Majora's Mask, Dragon Quest VII, and Kōkidō Gensō Gunparade March. VentureBeat dubbed it "one of the most important games in console gaming evolution". IGN named it one of the best RPGs of all time for being the first online experience for many gamers.

1UP.com called Phantasy Star Online one of the most revolutionary games of the 2000s, crediting it for creating "an entire pantheon of multiplayer dungeon crawlers that continue to dominate the Japanese sales charts" and making "both online gaming and the concept of fee-based services a reality for consoles". Hiroshi Matsuyama, president of CyberConnect2 and developer of the .hack series, cited the game as an influence. It is also believed to be a major influence on Capcom's Monster Hunter series.

According to GamesTM, the Phantasy Star series has struggled to live up to the legacy of Phantasy Star Online. Sega has been slow to localize Phantasy Star games, and the PSP entries in the series did not capture the attention of the West. Concurrently, Monster Hunter had a similar formula to Phantasy Star Online and became successful. Later Phantasy Star games, such as Phantasy Star Universe (2006), share similar gameplay with Phantasy Star Online but failed to reach the same critical and commercial success in the West. In Japan, Phantasy Star Universe became the best selling game in the franchise. Phantasy Star Online 2 was released in Japan in 2012, and localized for the West in 2020. Phantasy Star Online 2 made over 900 million dollars since its release.
