= Phantasy Star Portable =

2008 video game

- Developers: Sonic Team; Alfa System
- Publisher: Sega
- Director: Tatsuya Nagata
- Producers: Satoshi Sakai; Tetsuya Sasaki
- Artist: Akikazu Mizuno
- Writer: Yasushi Otake
- Composers: Hideaki Kobayashi; Taihei Sato; Kenichi Tokoi
- Series: Phantasy Star
- Platform: PlayStation Portable
- Release: JP: July 31, 2008; NA: March 3, 2009; AU: April 16, 2009; EU: April 17, 2009
- Genre: Action role-playing
- Modes: Single-player, multiplayer

Phantasy Star Portable (Note: Japanese: ファンタシースターポータブル, Hepburn: Fantashī Sutā Pōtaburu) is an action role-playing game co-developed by Sonic Team and Alfa System, and published by Sega for the PlayStation Portable. Sega released the game to Japan in July 2008, and to other markets in 2009.

In addition to the game's single-player story mode, Phantasy Star Portable has a cooperative multi-player mode that supports up to four players.

The 2009 sequel, Phantasy Star Portable 2, takes place three years after the events of Phantasy Star Portable.

== Plot ==
Phantasy Star Portable begins a few months after the conclusion of Phantasy Star Universe (2006) and its expansion, Ambition of the Illuminus (2007), in which an alliance of humans, newmans, beasts, and CASTs of the Gurhal star system drove off alien invaders known as S.E.E.D. The peace is short-lived, however. Vivienne, a newly constructed CAST android, and her partner (the player), discover that some SEED remain, and are causing trouble. Vivienne and her partner work to save the Gurhal system—and, in the process, learn more about humanity.

== Gameplay ==
The player begins by choosing one of four races and three character classes. The character design is adjustable through several variables: face model, eye color, eyebrows, eyelashes, ears, head type, body color, proportion, jacket, pants, shoes, voice type, and voice pitch.

Players are assigned missions in which they must kill all opponents in the area; many of the levels conclude with a boss battle. Along the way, players collect weapons, armour, money, and other helpful items.

== Characters ==
Player character
The player character is a newly trained member of the GUARDIANS, a security force that protects the Gurhal star system. S/He lives in a GUARDIAN space colony, and is a shy person who rarely speaks in the game.
Vivienne
Vivienne is a newly constructed CAST (an android created by the humans of Gurhal). Like the player, she has just completed basic training, and is now a hunter assigned to be the player's partner.
Laia Martinez
Laia is a hunter-class beast with the GUARDIANS. She is also the instructor who trained the player character. She accompanies the player on some missions.
Mina
Mina works at the mission counter at the headquarters of the GUARDIAN space colony. She gives the player and other GUARDIANS their mission assignments.
Helga Neumann
A woman who works with the Illuminus. Although she appears to be in her mid-twenties, she is actually 43 years old. She says that she died and was revived by the SEED. She caused the spread of the Remnant SEED and the creation of another HIVE.

== Reception ==
Reception

Aggregate score
Aggregator	Score
Metacritic	64/100

Review scores
Publication	Score
1Up.com	A−
Edge	4/10
Eurogamer	7/10
Famitsu	33/40
GamesMaster	71%
GamesTM	5/10
IGN	7/10
PlayStation Official Magazine – Australia	7/10
PlayStation Official Magazine – UK	6/10
PlayStation: The Official Magazine	3/5
VideoGamer.com	7/10

The game received "mixed" reviews according to the review aggregation website Metacritic. In Japan, Famitsu gave it a score of one nine and three eights for a total of 33 out of 40. James Mielke of 1Up.com gave the game an A− stating, "The truly neat trick that Portable performs is that it is not only an excellent distillation of the Phantasy Star Online/Universe experience, but it makes me want to go back and give Ambition of the Illuminus another shot, even if it's just to reinvestigate that game's offline mode."

In its first week on sale in Japan, the game sold more than 342,000 units. Phantasy Star Portable was the 14th best-selling game in Japan in 2008.
