= Phantasy Star Portable 2 =

2009 video game

- Developer: Alfa System
- Publisher: Sega
- Director: Yuya Kimura
- Producers: Satoshi Sakai; Tetsuya Sasaki
- Artist: Akikazu Mizuno
- Writer: Ryohei Uno
- Composers: Hideaki Kobayashi; Fumie Kumatani; Kenichi Tokoi
- Series: Phantasy Star
- Platform: PlayStation Portable
- Release: JP: December 3, 2009; NA: September 14, 2010; AU: September 16, 2010; EU: September 17, 2010
- Genre: Action role-playing
- Modes: Single-player, multiplayer

Phantasy Star Portable 2 (ファンタシースターポータブル2, Fantashī Sutā Pōtaburu Tsū) is a video game for the PlayStation Portable, produced by Alfa System and published by Sega. It is the sequel to Phantasy Star Portable and was released for the PlayStation Portable in Japan on December 3, 2009. The North American version was released on September 14, 2010, while the Australian version was released on September 16, 2010, followed by the European version the next day.

== Plot ==
Phantasy Star Portable 2 takes place three years after the events of Phantasy Star Portable. The humans have now defeated and sealed off the SEED. However, because material resources in the Gurhal galaxy have been depleted, the Gurhalians plan to migrate using technology based on "sub-space sailing theory". The player character is a member of Little Wing, a private mercenary group on the space colony resort of Clad 6.

== Gameplay ==
The player starts by designing and customizing his or her own character by choosing facial features, gender, body and vocal features. Though much of the gameplay features will be similar to its predecessor, there will be some notable differences. Photon Points are no longer attached to weapons, but characters instead. Photon Charges have also been removed from the game.

=== Features ===
Players are able to transfer over their character from Phantasy Star Portable to the game. However, not all data can be carried over. Data that can be transferred over includes the character's name and parts of the character's original appearance. However, the character's level and items cannot be transferred over. As a bonus for having done so, however, players acquire a photon saber that is named "Exam", as well as one of four armor units depending on the class that they have chosen. Furthermore, NPCs mention at times that the player is a former GUARDIAN.

Unlike Phantasy Star Portable, Phantasy Star Portable 2 features an infrastructure play mode allowing players to form a party with other users through an internet connection, similar to Phantasy Star Online, Phantasy Star Zero, and Phantasy Star Universe. This service does not require a monthly subscription, as many other titles in the series do.

== Phantasy Star Portable 2 Infinity ==
On August 8, 2010, the official Phantasy Star Portable 2 site revealed Phantasy Star Portable 2 Infinity. The game contains a new character named Nagisa (Voiced by: Nana Mizuki), and the addition of a fifth race, S.E.E.D infected humans called Dumans. It was released in Japan only on February 24, 2011.

== Reception ==
Reception

Aggregate score
Aggregator	Score
Metacritic	69/100

Review scores
Publication	Score
Eurogamer	7/10
Famitsu	34/40
GamesMaster	78%
GameSpot	7/10
GameZone	7/10
IGN	8/10
PlayStation Official Magazine – UK	7/10
PALGN	7/10
Play	68%
PlayStation: The Official Magazine	5/10

The game received "average" reviews according to the review aggregation website Metacritic. In Japan, Famitsu gave it a score of two nines and two eights for the original, and one ten and three nines (37/40) for the Infinity version.
