= Phantasy Star Universe =

2006 video game

- Developer: Sonic Team
- Publisher: Sega
- Director: Satoshi Sakai
- Producer: Takao Miyoshi
- Programmer: Yasuhiro Takahashi
- Artist: Kosei Kitamura
- Writers: Sakae Tabata; Naozumi Yamaguchi; Satoshi Sakai; Yasushi Otake; Yuya Kimura
- Composers: Hideaki Kobayashi; Fumie Kumatani; Kenichi Tokoi; Seirou Okamoto; Taihei Sato
- Series: Phantasy Star
- Platforms: Microsoft Windows, PlayStation 2, Xbox 360
- Release: PlayStation 2, Windows: JP: August 31, 2006; NA: October 24, 2006; EU: November 24, 2006; AU: November 30, 2006; Xbox 360: NA: October 24, 2006; EU: November 24, 2006; AU: November 30, 2006; JP: December 14, 2006
- Genre: Action role-playing
- Modes: Single-player, Multiplayer

Phantasy Star Universe (ファンタシースターユニバース, Fantashī Sutā Yunibāsu) (PSU) is an action role-playing video game developed by Sega's Sonic Team for the Microsoft Windows, PlayStation 2 and Xbox 360 platforms. It was released in Japan for the PC and PlayStation 2 on August 31, 2006; the Xbox 360 version was released there on December 14, 2006. Its North American release was in October 2006, in all formats. The European release date was November 24 the same year, while the Australian release date was November 30.

Phantasy Star Universe is similar to the Phantasy Star Online (PSO) games, but takes place in a different time period and location, and has many new features. Like most of the PSO titles, PSU was playable in both a persistent online network mode and a fully featured, single-player story mode.

== Plot ==
Ethan Waber, the main character, and his younger sister, Lumia Waber, are at the celebration of the 100th anniversary of the Alliance Space Fleet on the GUARDIANS Space station. The celebration is interrupted when a mysterious meteor shower almost destroys the entire fleet. During an evacuation, Ethan and Lumia divert from the main evacuation route; collapsing rubble separates Lumia from Ethan. Ethan then meets up with a GUARDIAN named Leo, but they are attacked by a strange creature that paralyzes Leo. Ethan kills the creature. After killing multiple creatures and saving people, Ethan finds Lumia and they leave the station. Ethan reveals that he dislikes the GUARDIANS organization because his father died on a mission. Leo, impressed with Ethan's abilities, persuades Ethan to join the GUARDIANS.

Ethan and his classmate Hyuga Ryght are trained by a GUARDIAN named Karen Erra, who leads them against the S.E.E.D, the monsters that came from the meteors. After being hired to accompany a scientist to a RELICS site of an ancient, long-dead civilization, they find out that the SEED are attracted to a power source called A-Photons, which the ancients used and that the Solar System has just rediscovered. Karen discovers she is the sister of the Divine Maiden, the prophet of the Holy Light, and takes over that role when her sister dies at the hands of her estranged father who intended to kill Karen to increase the power of the original Divine Maiden (Mirei). After befriending Rogues, Guardians, and CASTs alike, Ethan angers Magashi, a CAST who heads the Endrum Collective and has been kidnapping scientists who know about the ancient power source.

Ethan and a Rogue named Alfort Tylor kill Magashi. Ethan helps activate an ancient weapon the prior civilization used to survive the S.E.E.D before they were almost completely wiped out. Ethan gathers allies against GUARDIAN orders to attack the last S.E.E.D outpost, where two of his friends and the scientists are being held. In the outpost, Magashi claims to have been resurrected by the S.E.E.D, but he is actually a CAST incarnation of Dark Force, who controls the S.E.E.D and whatever they infect. With the help of Karen, Leo, and Tonnio, Ethan defeats Magashi.

=== Continuation ===
Ambition of the Illuminus is a direct continuation of Phantasy Star Universe. Shortly after the defeat of Magashi and the Endrum Collective, a mysterious group known as the Illuminus have appeared and threaten to exterminate all non-human races. The GUARDIANS are under attack, and Ethan Waber is now wanted for an attempted assassination. GUARDIAN instructor Laia Martinez is determined to find Ethan at any cost. As a new GUARDIAN receiving guidance from Laia, the player must search for Ethan and uncover the truth.

=== Setting ===
The universe is the Gurhal Star System, which consists of three planets; Parum, Neudaiz, and Moatoob – as well as a large space station, which, in addition to housing a large civilian population, also serves as the headquarters of the Guardians. Each planet has its own unique culture formed by its inhabitant races. The history of the Gurhal Star System is filled with conflict among the different races. However, after the Final Conflict 100 years ago, a union was formed between the three planets. This led to the birth of the Allied Army and ultimately to peace for the Gurhal Star System.

== Development ==
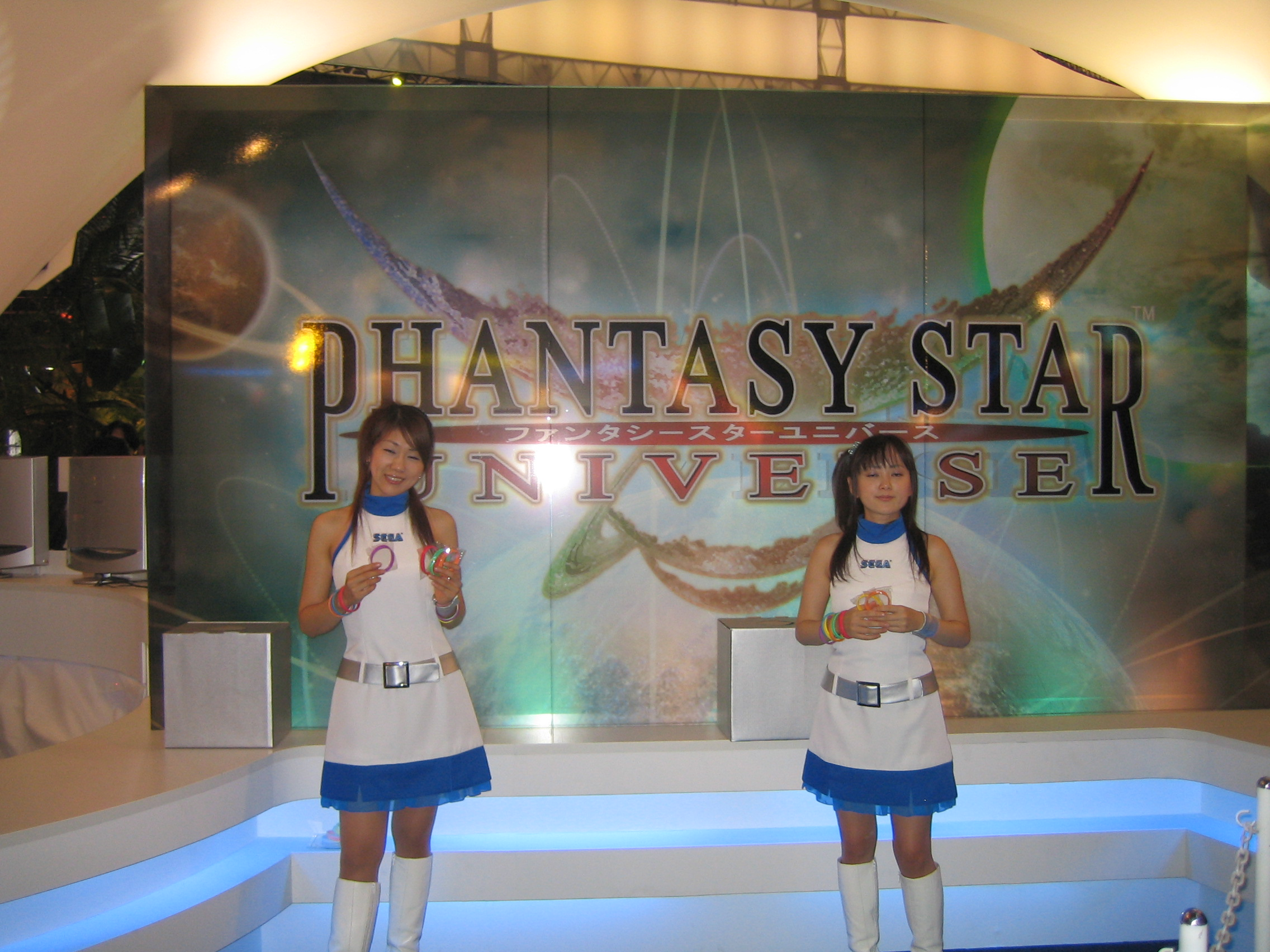
Promotion of the game at the Tokyo Game Show in 2005

The game was first unveiled at E3 2004, with a subsequent showing at the next E3, and then again at TGS 2005. A closed beta stress test for the servers took place between April and May 2006.

== Release ==
=== Ambition of the Illuminus ===
Phantasy Star Universe: Ambition of the Illuminus
- Developer: Sonic Team
- Publisher: Sega
- Director: Satoshi Sakai
- Producer: Takao Miyoshi
- Programmer: Yasuhiro Takahashi
- Artist: Kosei Kitamura
- Writers: Sakae Tabata; Naozumi Yamaguchi; Satoshi Sakai; Yasushi Otake; Yuya Kimura
- Composers: Hideaki Kobayashi; Fumie Kumatani; Kenichi Tokoi; Seirou Okamoto; Taihei Sato
- Series: Phantasy Star
- Platforms: Microsoft Windows, PlayStation 2, Xbox 360
- Release: JP: September 27, 2007 (PS2, PC); NA: November 20, 2007; EU: November 20, 2007 (X360); NA: November 21, 2007 (PC); EU: January 25, 2008; AU: February 14, 2008
- Genre: Action role-playing
- Modes: Single-player, Multiplayer

Phantasy Star Universe: Ambition of the Illuminus (ファンタシースターユニバース イルミナスの野望, Fantashī Sutā Yunibāsu: Iruminasu no Yabō) is the first expansion of Phantasy Star Universe, available for Windows, PlayStation 2, and Xbox 360. It was released initially in Japan on September 27, 2007, for PlayStation 2 and PC; subsequent territorial releases followed in November 2007, when North America received the expansion for all three platforms. This date also marked the worldwide release of the Xbox 360 version, which was available for download through Microsoft's Xbox Live service.

Although it is an expansion pack, the Windows and PlayStation 2 versions of Ambition of the Illuminus are standalone and do not require the original game to play. The Xbox 360 version does require the original disc because the expansion is downloadable content. On June 30, 2010, the expansion became free on Xbox Live. As of July 20, 2010, the expansion is required for users wishing to play online. An updated version was released at this time which contains GUARDIANS Advanced Content. Ambition of the Illuminus introduced numerous new features to Phantasy Star Universe including new weapons, Photon Arts, missions, clothing, enemies, and more.

=== Server closures ===
Due to low levels of use, the North American and PAL PC/PS2 servers of Phantasy Star Universe were shut down on March 31, 2010. PS2 support for the Japanese servers was discontinued on April 14, 2011. The Xbox 360 servers were shut down on September 7, 2012. The Japanese PC servers were closed as of 00:00 JST on September 28, 2012. Despite this, fans have created private servers for the game and still play to this day.

== Reception ==
=== Phantasy Star Universe ===
Phantasy Star Universe

Aggregate score
Aggregator	Score		
Aggregator	PC	PS2	Xbox 360
Metacritic	59/100	68/100	64/100

Review scores
Publication	Score		
Publication	PC	PS2	Xbox 360
Edge	N/A	N/A	6/10
Electronic Gaming Monthly	N/A	7.17/10	7.17/10
Eurogamer	N/A	N/A	6/10
Game Informer	6/10	6/10	6/10
GameRevolution	N/A	N/A	C−
GameSpot	N/A	N/A	6.8/10
GameSpy	2.5/5	2/5	2.5/5
GameZone	6.8/10	N/A	N/A
IGN	5.5/10	6.6/10	6.4/10
PlayStation Official Magazine – UK	N/A	7/10	N/A
Official U.S. PlayStation Magazine	N/A	8/10	N/A
Official Xbox Magazine (US)	N/A	N/A	6.5/10
PC Gamer (UK)	49%	N/A	N/A
PC Gamer (US)	48%	N/A	N/A
411Mania	N/A	N/A	5.3/10

The game received "mixed or average reviews" on all platforms according to the review aggregation website Metacritic. Erik Brudvig of IGN said of the PlayStation 2 version, "The result is an unsatisfying and stale experience that feels like an update to an old game that has had its day rather than a new title." In Japan, Famitsu gave the PS2 version a score of two nines, one eight, and one nine for a total of 35 out of 40.

The Academy of Interactive Arts & Sciences nominated Phantasy Star Universe for "Role-Playing Game of the Year" at the 10th Annual Interactive Achievement Awards.

=== Ambition of the Illuminus ===
Phantasy Star Universe: Ambition of the Illuminus

Aggregate score
Aggregator	Score		
Aggregator	PC	PS2	Xbox 360
Metacritic	N/A	70/100	N/A

Review scores
Publication	Score		
Publication	PC	PS2	Xbox 360
Eurogamer	N/A	N/A	7/10
PlayStation Official Magazine – UK	N/A	7/10	N/A
PC Gamer (UK)	40%	N/A	N/A

The PS2 version of the Ambition of the Illuminus expansion pack received "average" reviews, while the PC version received "unfavorable" reviews, according to Metacritic.

== Legacy ==
Phantasy Star Universe's setting, story, and characters have been continued and expanded upon in three PlayStation Portable games; Phantasy Star Portable, Phantasy Star Portable 2, and Phantasy Star Portable 2: Infinity. The games offer new features and content; as in the Ambition of the Illuminus expansion pack, players play through the story mode as their own characters. In the Japanese version of Phantasy Star Portable, it was possible to import some character data from the PC and PS2 versions of the game, this was however not possible in other regions. In 2012, Phantasy Star Online 2 was released as a brand-new game with a story disconnected from Phantasy Star Online or Phantasy Star Universe. PSO2 saw an official English-language release in 2020. Ethan and Karen made an appearance as part of a limited in-game event.

"Guardians," a song from the game's soundtrack, was on a playlist of Japanese video game music that played during the 2020 Summer Olympics Parade of Nations in the opening ceremony.
