= Official Dreamcast Magazine (US magazine) =

Video game magazine

- February 2001 issue
- Editor-in-chief: Chris Charla
- Editor: Simon Cox
- Categories: Computer and video games
- Frequency: Monthly/bimonthly
- First issue: September/October 1999
- Final issue Number: March/April 2001; 13
- Company: Imagine Media Inc.
- Country: USA
- ISSN: 1525-1764

The Official Dreamcast Magazine (commonly abbreviated as ODCM and formerly known as Official Sega Dreamcast Magazine) was a video game magazine for the Dreamcast video game console published in the United States. It was published by Imagine Media.

== History ==
The magazine's initial issue "0" was released in June 1999, a full 3 months before the launch of the system. This issue featured Sonic the Hedgehog on a black cover, along with the launch date and some of the system's unique features. Upon the magazines release on August 24, 1999, they printed 330,000 copies of the debut issue. The magazine ran for twelve issues from the September 1999 Dreamcast launch to March/April 2001, shortly after Dreamcast was discontinued.

Starting with issue 2, each issue came with a GD-ROM with demos of Dreamcast games. The final issue did not come with a disc. This was explained as Sega looking for a new way to distribute demos. The cancellation was apparently unexpected as the magazine promised more information about demo distribution in future issues and had a preview for the next issue where Phantasy Star Online was to be reviewed. Much of the staff went on to work for Official Xbox Magazine.

The magazine was published bimonthly, but during the 2000 holiday season, issues were sold monthly due to additional relevant content being available for the shopping season.

== Structure and features ==
The first issue introduced the Dreamcast console, the magazine itself, profiles of game designers, and Dreamcast news from Europe and Japan.

The general structure of Dreamcast Magazine included several key sections:

Visuals: The magazine featured a variety of images, often including detailed game walkthroughs and gameplay screenshots.

Game Reviews: Each issue included reviews of Dreamcast games, offering gameplay analysis, an overall impression, and rating.

Previews: The magazine provided sneak peeks at upcoming Dreamcast games, highlighting new gameplay mechanics and features.

Developer Interviews: There were interviews with game developers, including Sega executives and industry experts, offering insights into game development and trends.

=== Special Features ===
Hardware Tutorials: Guides on how to use or enhance Dreamcast hardware.

Tips and Tricks: Strategies for players to improve their gameplay.

Strategy Sections: Walkthroughs, cheat codes, and strategies for popular Dreamcast titles.

Hardware & Accessories: Dedicated to Dreamcast peripherals, such as controllers, memory cards, and Visual Memory Units .

Reader Interaction: Fans could write in, comment, and provide feedback, creating a space for community engagement.

This structure allowed Dreamcast Magazine to cater to both casual and dedicated Dreamcast fans, offering a balance of game-focused content and interactive features.

Games seen within the Official Dreamcast Magazines received a rating of M for Mature 17+ on the ESRB scale. Most games displayed within the magazines were rated M for mature, such as Dino Crisis, Resident Evil, Half-Life, Record of Lodoss War, and Unreal Tournament. The content within the magazine was considered provocative, often picturing women who are in bikinis or other revealing clothing. The Official Dreamcast Magazine UK is marketed towards "predominantly, but not exclusively, 22–30 year old males, who may or may not have an existing interest in gaming." This helped Sega expand its market to older audiences rather than just teens and younger children.

== Reviews ==
The magazine used multiple reviewing techniques, including the 24-hour review, where a reviewer would play the game for 24 hours, even if the game was bad. They also compared games to similar ones.

The Dreamcast was known for being very honest with their reviews, sometimes seen as even "too harsh." Writers often rated games on a lower scale than other magazines at the time.

== Reception ==
At the magazine's beginning, they were selling more than 250,000 copies, which is similar to Electronic Gaming Monthly's circulation. The magazine's short two year run was initially started to boost the new console the Dreamcast. The Dreamcast console sales reflected the magazine sales. By 2000, Sega was losing money on each console and was relying on games to cover it; they were losing about 400 million dollars a year. The next year, 2001, the final issue of the Dreamcast Magazine was released.

== See also ==
- List of video game magazines
- Video game journalism
