= List of Earl Cain chapters =

The first volume of Earl Cain, released in Japan by Hakusensha on July 17, 1992

The chapters of Earl Cain are written and illustrated by Kaori Yuki. The series consists of five parts or "Series": Forgotten Juliet (忘れられたジュリエット, Wasurerareta Jurietto), The Sound of a Boy Hatching (少年の孵化する音, Shōnen no Fukasuru Oto), Kafka (カフカ, Kafuka), The Seal of the Red Ram (赤い羊の刻印, Akai Hitsuji no Kokuin), and the sequel series Godchild (ゴッド チャイルド, Goddo Chairudo). The manga debuted in the December 1991 issue of the Japanese manga magazine Bessatsu Hana to Yume, and it was eventually transferred to Hana to Yume, where it ran until the seventeenth issue. The chapters of Forgotten Juliet, The Sound of a Boy Hatching, Kafka, and The Seal of the Red Ram were published in five tankōbon volumes by Hakusensha from July 17, 1992, to October 1994. The chapters of the sequel series, Godchild, ran in Hana to Yume from 2001 to 2004, and were published in eight volumes by Hakusensha from November 19, 2001, to January 19, 2004. Together, the series spans 13 volumes. Hakusensha later published chapters from Forgotten Juliet, The Sound of a Boy Hatching, Kafka, and The Seal of the Red Ram in two volumes from December 20, 2004, to January 28, 2005. Hakusensha re-released the series in bunkoban format from July 15, 2009, to March 16, 2010. Set in 19th-century England, the series focuses on a young earl named Cain Hargreaves who solves murders while encountering his father's secret organization, which experiments with reviving the dead.

Earl Cain is licensed for English-language release in North America by Viz Media, which published Forgotten Juliet, The Sound of a Boy Hatching, Kafka, and The Seal of the Red Ram as The Cain Saga and a prequel to Godchild. Viz published The Cain Saga from October 3, 2006, to June 5, 2007. Godchild was released simultaneously from March 7, 2006, to February 5, 2008, as well as being serialized in Viz's Shojo Beat anthology from July 2005 to June 2006. Earl Cain is also licensed in Taiwan by Tong Li Comics, in Germany by Carlsen Comics, in Italy by Planet Manga, in Sweden by Bonnier Carlsen, in Spain by Glénat, and in France by Editions Tonkam.

== Volume list ==
No.	Title	Original release date	English release date
01	Forgotten Juliet; Wasurerareta Jurietto (忘れられたジュリエット)	July 17, 1992; 978-4-592-12597-6	October 3, 2006; 978-1-59116-975-8
"Forgotten Juliet" (忘れられたジュリエット, "Wasurerareta Jurietto"); "Branded Bibi" (烙印のビビ, "Rakuin no Bibi"); 1. "The Boys Who Stopped Time" (時間を止めた少年たち, "Jikan o tome ta shōnen tachi") (Note: "The Boys Who Stopped Time" has a different protagonist and is a separate story outside of the series; it is a murder mystery which takes place at an Edwardian boarding school.); 1. "Double" (ダブル, "Daburu") (Note: "Double" is a separate story outside of the series with a different protagonist. Set in the present day, it focuses on a case of an actor's mistaken identity.); "The Death of Cleo Dreyfus" (クレオ・ドレイファスの死, "Kureo Doreifasu no Shi")
In "Forgotten Juliet", Suzette, Cain's half-sister and secret love, fakes her death as part of her plan to run away with her secret lover, but goes insane from being trapped in her premature grave. She escapes and wanders around, killing people in the process; she then goes to her lover's wedding to another woman, and kills him and herself. In "Branded Bibi", Cain encounters a hypnotized girl being used by her stepmother to kill her father, and is unable to prevent her from doing so. In "The Death of Cleo Dreyfus", Cain accuses the older brother of a deceased friend of murder. Believing Cain poisoned him, he quickly leaves for a nearby hospital, only to drive off a cliff.
02	The Sound of a Boy Hatching; Shōnen no Fukasuru Oto (少年の孵化する音)	October 19, 1993; 978-4-592-12642-3	December 5, 2006; 978-1-59116-977-2
1. "The Hanged Man" (吊られた男, "Tsurareta Otoko"); "The Sound of a Boy Hatching" (少年の孵化する音, "Shōnen no Fukasuru Oto"); "Who killed Cock Robin?" (誰がこまどり殺したの?, "Dare ga komadori koroshita no?"); 1. "The Tragic Tale of Ms. Pudding" (切り刻まれ食べられたミス・プディングの悲劇, "Kirikizamareta Taberareta Miss Pudding no Higeki"); 2. "The Twisted Fairy Tale" (捩れた童話, "Nejireta dōwa")
A motherless girl named Mary Weather reads Cain's fortune in "The Hanged Man", and foretells that a man will murder three people and bring him misery. As her predictions come true, Cain comes to believe that she is his father's illegitimate daughter. Cain rescues her from her dead mother's obsessive husband, and unofficially adopts her. Cain's valet, Riff, recalls in "The Sound of a Boy Hatching" how he first met him, and how Cain's abusive father, Alexis Hargreaves, committed suicide after Cain attempted to kill him. In "Who killed Cock Robin?", Cain solves a series of murders resembling lines from the children's rhyme "Who Killed Cock Robin". In "The Tragic Tale of Ms. Pudding", he investigates the 'Plum Pudding Murderer', who murders the members of a gentlemen's club that abused and drugged children for amusement; the murderer is one of their victims. In "The Twisted Fairy Tale", Cain takes revenge on a relative and a maid who killed an orphan boy they thought was him to cover up their thefts.
03	Kafka; Kafuka (カフカ)	February 18, 1994; 978-4-592-12659-1	February 6, 2007; 978-1-4215-0089-8
1. "Kafka part 1"; 2. "Kafka part 2"; 3. "Kafka part 3"; 4. "Kafka part 4"; 1. "Kafka final part" 2. "Postscript"; 3. "Ellie in Summer Clothes" (夏服のエリー, Natsufuku no Erie) (Note: "Ellie in Summer Clothes" is Yuki's 1987 debut story; it has a different protagonist and is a separate story outside of the series.)
Discovering that he was mysteriously poisoned, Cain decides to go to the countryside with Riff, Mary, and Ancel Allen, the family doctor. There, he learns that a vampire has been killing girls, and meets Dirk and Justine, the inhabitants of a nearby castle. He eventually discovers that Justine has a split personality which causes her to believe that she is a vampire. In love with his sister, Dirk dies with her in the fire set by a mob. Allen reveals that he is Jizabel Disraeli, Alexis' illegitimate son; Alexis survived his suicide and now leads a secret organization named Delilah.
04	The Seal of the Red Ram part 1 Akai Hitsuji no Kokuin: 1 (赤い羊の刻印: 1)	June 1994; 978-4592122340	April 3, 2007; 978-1-4215-0475-9
1. "The Seal of the Red Ram" part 1; 2. "Postscript"
As part of an agreement for Mary to be officially adopted by the Hargreaves, Cain becomes engaged to Emeline Lauderdale, a haughty aristocrat whose brother, Gilford, went insane after witnessing a "red ram". Cain, however, falls in love with Meridiana, an amnesiac fortuneteller whom he vows to save from Jizabel. Hearing from Meridiana's mother that she died, he and Riff dig up her grave. Emeline sees him leaving and follows him, only to be murdered by Jack the Ripper. Upon hearing of her death, Cain swears to seek revenge on Jack the Ripper. Jizabel uses Emeline's blood and organs to replenish Meridiana's; Meridiana is a "doll", a corpse resurrected by Delilah, and therefore needs a constant supply of fresh blood and organs to live.
05	The Seal of the Red Ram part 2 Akai Hitsuji no Kokuin: 2 (赤い羊の刻印: 2)	October 1994; 978-4592122357	June 5, 2007; 978-1-4215-0899-3
1. "The Seal of the Red Ram" part 2; 2. "Elizabeth in the Mirror" (鏡の中のエリザベス); 3. "Postscript"
Running away from Jizabel, Meridiana decides with Cain to enter the lair of Jack the Ripper—her mother; Meridiana is fatally wounded while protecting him from her. Although Jizabel attempts to bargain her life for Cain's eyes, Meridiana kills herself, wishing to protect Cain and not wanting to live on other people's blood. Her mother then kills Gilford, Meridiana's last lover, and herself. In "Elizabeth in the Mirror", a younger Cain attends a party to find a husband for a girl who died years ago. Her twin sister takes revenge on the stepmother who abused and murdered her.

=== Godchild ===
No.	Original release date	Original ISBN	English release date	English ISBN
01	November 19, 2001	978-4-592-17801-9	March 7, 2006	978-1-4215-0233-5
1. "Mad Tea Party"; 2. "The Little Crooked House Part 1"; 3. "The Little Crooked House Part 2"; 4. "Black Sheep"; 1. "Scold's Bridle Part 1"; 2. "Scold's Bridle Part 2"; 3. "Epilogue"
In "Mad Tea Party", Cain attends a party and encounters an axe murderer who is killing a group of friends one by one. Cain rescues the final victim and unmasks the murderer. In "The Little Crooked House", Mary later befriends a lonely crippled girl, Rebecca, only to have her attempt to keep her forever as a living doll. Cain rescues her, and Rebecca dies in the fire her insane housekeeper sets. In "Black Sheep", Riff remembers how Cain defended him against claims of murdering a French maid. In "Scold's Bridle", Cain discovers that the women who are mysteriously dying are actually Jizabel's human test subjects in an experiment involving parasites.
02	March 19, 2002	978-4-592-17802-6	August 1, 2006	978-1-4215-0237-3
1. "Butterfly Bones Scene 1"; 2. "Butterfly Bones Scene 2"; 3. "Butterfly Bones Scene 3"; 1. "Butterfly Bones Scene 4"; 2. "Bloodberry Jam"; 3. "Lion Crest"
In "Butterfly Bones", Cain and Mary visit their estranged distant relatives, the Cromwells, and on the way there, they encounter Lukia Cromwell, a possessed half-Japanese girl. Together with her family and the medium Crehador, Cain participates in a séance to drive out the spirit possessing Lukia, during which her stepmother dies. He discovers that Lukia's half-brother killed her for revenge and to protect her. In "Bloodberry Jam", Mary is mistaken for Lady Grace's deceased granddaughter, and Cain learns that Lady Grace's servants have been covering up the murder that she accidentally committed, out of love for her. In "Lion Crest", he investigates a murder committed by a man who tried to protect his sister from her abusive fiancé.
03	June 19, 2002	978-4-592-17803-3	November 6, 2006	978-1-4215-0477-3
1. "Zigeunerweisen Part 1"; 2. "Zigeunerweisen Part 2"; 3. "Mortician's Daughter Scene 1"; 4. "Mortician's Daughter Scene 2"; 1. "Mortician's Daughter Scene 3"; 2. "The Stake"; 3. "Postscript"
In "Zigeunerweisen", Alexis appears to Cain's uncle to discuss the ring that belonged to Alexis's father, Cain's godfather. In "Mortician's Daughter", Cain discovers that Oscar, Mary's suitor, is being stalked by Mr. Coffin Maker, a member of Delilah. Learning that it is a case of mistaken identity, Cain tracks down the girl ordering the murder. In "The Stake", Riff's ex-fiancée, angry at him for setting the fire which killed her lover, attempts to murder Cain for revenge; Riff, however, believes that he is innocent and sends her away with a warning not to hurt Cain again.
04	October 18, 2002	978-4-592-17804-0	February 6, 2007	978-1-4215-0478-0
1. "Little Miss Muffet Scene 1"; 2. "Little Miss Muffet Scene 2"; 3. "Little Miss Muffet Scene 3"; 4. "Bloody Maria Scene 1"; 1. "Bloody Maria Scene 2"; 2. "Bloody Maria Scene 3"; 3. "Postscript"
Riff and Cain encounter Mikaila, a doll who claims to be Suzette, since she was created with her genes. Angered by Cain's rejection, she attempts to fatally poison him, instead poisoning Riff; Riff is later cured by Jizabel. Jizabel later undergoes the ritual to become a high-ranking member of Delilah. Believing that he has been killing blond-haired boys who model for Maria Stanford, Cain searches for him at her house; however, he discovers that Maria is the murderer, and she commits suicide.
05	February 19, 2003	978-4-592-17805-7	May 1, 2007	978-1-4215-1015-6
1. "Castrato Scene 1"; 2. "Castrato Scene 2"; 3. "Castrato Scene 3"; 1. "Castrato Scene 4"; 2. "Castrato Scene 5"; 3. "Solomon Grundy's Sunday"
Accompanied by Riff, Cain investigates Cassandra Gladstone, the primary shareholder of Crimone Gardens; during his investigation, numerous bystanders die there. He learns that Gladstone, secretly Delilah's high priest, is responsible for their deaths, and, disguised, ruins him in front of London's high society. Gladstone later attempts to murder Jizabel, but fatally wounds his assistant, Cassian, instead. Jizabel kills him by transplanting Cassian's brain into his body. In "Solomon Grundy's Sunday", Cain takes revenge on a man who murdered his lover over a doll containing a sapphire ring.
06	June 19, 2003	978-4-592-17806-4	August 7, 2007	978-1-4215-1016-3
1. "Judas Kiss Scene 1"; 2. "Judas Kiss Scene 2"; 3. "Judas Kiss Scene 3"; 4. "Judas Kiss Scene 4"; 1. "Judas Kiss Scene 5"; 2. "Judas Kiss Scene 6"; "Interview with Kaori Yuki"
Cain informs his close relatives and friends of his intentions to hunt down Alexis and Delilah. While Riff investigates, Alexis allows Riff's second, cruel personality to resurface. Cain attempts to unmask Mayor Gloria as being connected with Delilah. Discovering that the evidence has been switched, Cain learns that Riff is a high-ranking member of Delilah and that his loyalty was only a false personality implanted by Delilah. Later, Cain causes the death of Mayor Gloria by manipulating the mayor's bodyguard, and vows to save Riff from Alexis.
07	October 17, 2003	978-4-592-17807-1	November 6, 2007	978-1-4215-1134-4
1. "Oedipus Blade Scene 1"; 2. "Oedipus Blade Scene 2"; 3. "Oedipus Blade Scene 3"; 1. "Misericorde Scene 1"; 2. "Misericorde Scene 2"; 3. "Misericorde Scene 3"
Kidnapped, Cain learns that Alexis plans to use an older Mikaila to give birth to his child. He eventually escapes, and brings her, fatally wounded on Alexis's orders, to one of his hideouts. She clashes with Mary, believing that she is competing with her for his affection. Dying, she discovers that she must kill Mary to rejoin Delilah and continue to live; Jizabel later reveals to Cain that he suffered psychological trauma caused by Alexis. Protecting Mary from a member of Delilah sent to kill them, Mikaila dies as she ponders the meaning of her artificially created life.
08	January 19, 2004	978-4-592-17808-8	February 5, 2008	978-1-4215-1536-6
1. "Godless Scene I"; 2. "Godless Scene II"; 3. "Godless Scene III"; 1. "Godless Scene IV"; 2. "Godless Scene V"; 3. "Godless Scene VI"
Led by a disguised Cassian, Cain reaches the tower where Delilah plans to conduct the ritual to resurrect Augusta—Alexis' elder sister and Cain's mother. Riff learns that he is a doll, which sparks an internal struggle; his loyal personality overcomes the cruel one, but he is separated from Cain. Jizabel commits suicide so Riff can return to Cain by using his blood. Meanwhile, Cain kills his father, learning that the dolls created by Delilah were Alexis's attempts to resurrect her. He reunites with Riff as the tower collapses on them. Possessing Alexis, Augusta attempts to murder Mary, revealing that she orchestrated the hatred between Cain and Alexis, but is killed. Years later, Crehador sets up a tea party for Mary, fulfilling Cain's promise to her.
