= Earl Cain =

Japanese manga series by Kaoru Yuki

- Cover of the first volume as published by Hakusensha (1992), depicting the protagonist

伯爵カインシリーズ (Hakushaku Kain Shirīzu)
- Genre: Gothic
- Manga

The Cain Saga
- Written by: Kaori Yuki
- Published by: Hakusensha
- English publisher: NA: Viz Media
- Magazine: Bessatsu Hana to Yume, Hana to Yume
- Original run: 1991 – 1994
- Volumes: 5
- Manga

Godchild
- Written by: Kaori Yuki
- Published by: Hakusensha
- English publisher: NA: Viz Media
- Magazine: Hana to Yume
- English magazine: NA: Shojo Beat
- Original run: May 2001 – October 2003
- Volumes: 8
- Manga

Godchild Ihо̄jin -Hakushaku Cain The Lost Story-
- Written by: Kaori Yuki
- Published by: Hakusensha
- Magazine: Hana Yume Ai
- Original run: January 2026 – present

Earl Cain (Japanese: 伯爵カインシリーズ, Hepburn: Hakushaku Kain Shirīzu), also known as Count Cain, is a gothic shōjo manga series written and illustrated by Kaori Yuki. Earl Cain consists of five parts or "Series": Forgotten Juliet (忘れられたジュリエット, Wasurerareta Jurietto), The Sound of a Boy Hatching (少年の孵化する音, Shōnen no Fukasuru Oto), Kafka (カフカ, Kafuka), The Seal of the Red Ram (赤い羊の刻印, Akai Hitsuji no Kokuin), and the sequel series Godchild (ゴッド チャイルド, Goddo Chairudo).

Debuting in the Japanese manga magazine Bessatsu Hana to Yume in December 1991, the manga was eventually transferred to Hana to Yume, where it ran until 1994; the chapters of the sequel, Godchild, appeared between the May 2001 issue and the October 2003 issue in Hana to Yume. Together, the series spans 13 tankōbon volumes, with five for Forgotten Juliet, The Sound of a Boy Hatching, Kafka, and The Seal of the Red Ram and eight for Godchild. Two drama CDs based on the series were also released. Set in 19th-century England, the series focuses on a young earl named Cain Hargreaves who solves murders while encountering his father's secret organization, Delilah, that experiments with reviving the dead.

Earl Cain is licensed for English-language release in North America by Viz Media, which published Forgotten Juliet, The Sound of a Boy Hatching, Kafka, and The Seal of the Red Ram as The Cain Saga. The first volume of The Cain Saga was published in October 2006; the final volume was published in June 2007. Godchild was released simultaneously, as well as being serialized in Viz's manga anthology Shojo Beat from July 2005 to June 2006.

The setting of the manga was inspired by "the darker, grislier side" of the Victorian upper class and her admiration of films set in the Victorian time period. For Godchild, she traveled to London to do historical research and visited seven historical sites there. In the series, she refers to the Bible as well as real-life literary works, films and people. Reviewers have found a range of themes in the series. Critical reaction to The Cain Saga was mixed: some felt that the mysteries were well-done with detailed art, while others found the art crude and the short stories confusing and predictable. Reviewers praised Godchild as an overdone, entertaining series with detailed and distinct art.

== Plot ==
=== Characters ===
Set during the late Victorian era in London, the series focuses on its eponymous protagonist Cain C. Hargreaves (カイン・C・ハーグリーヴス, Kain Shĩ Hāgurīvuzu) (Note: He does not appear in two of Forgotten Juliet's mysteries: "The Boys Who Stopped Time", a murder mystery set in an early 20th-century boarding school, and "Double", a modern mystery about an actor.) the seventeen-year-old son of Alexis Hargreaves and Alexis's elder sister, Augusta. Abused physically and emotionally by his father for her subsequent insanity, Cain poisoned him, after a dying Augusta warned him to escape. Before Alexis plunged into the sea, he cursed his son to have a miserable life and die alone. Cain inherited his father's title of earl as a result of his presumed death. Accompanying him is his twenty-eight-year-old butler Riffael "Riff" Raffit (リフェール・ラフィット, Rifēru Rafitto), a former medical student with whom he shares a close bond. (Note: Yuki has compared their relationship to that of a parent and child, although she stated in an interview that "a lot" of her readers have seen it as a homosexual relationship.) Cain's uncle and legal guardian Neil Hargreaves (ニール・ハーグリーヴス, Nīru Hāgurīvuzu) tends to become upset with his behavior and course of action. Often annoyed by Cain's relationships with women, Cain's ten-year-old half sister, the outgoing and strongwilled Mary Weather Hargreaves (マリーウェザー･ハーグリーヴス, Marīwezā Hāgurīvuzu) also lives with them. Previously, she lived on the streets as a fortuneteller, after her mother died to protect her. One of Cain's friends, Oscar Gabriel, becomes her self-proclaimed fiancé to win back his father's attention. As the series progresses, he risks his life to protect her, and she realizes that he genuinely cares for her.

Alexis Hargreaves (アレクシス・ハーグリーヴス, Arekushisu Hāgurīvuzu) and his secret organization, Delilah, serve as the antagonists of the series. Delilah conducts experiments to revive the dead, creating "deadly dolls" or resurrected corpses surviving on the fresh blood and organs of others. The deadly dolls each possess a supernatural ability, such as seeing the future. Among the deadly dolls is the spider-controlling Mikaila (ミケイラ), who is a doll of Suzette (シュゼット, Shuzetto), Augusta's daughter and Cain's childhood love. Cain's half brother and Alexis's illegitimate son, Jizabel Disraeli (ジザベル・ディズレーリ, Jizaberu Dizurēri) works as a doctor for the organization, conducting experiments on humans. Although Alexis physically abused and emotionally traumatized him as well, he refuses to escape from him, and simultaneously despises and envies the bond between Cain and Riff as he believes unconditional love does not exist. His thirty-five-year-old assistant Cassian (カシアン, Kashian), whose body stopped growing due to a rare strain of dwarfism and who was subsequently sold to a circus as a child by his parents, shows concern for Jizabel and his involvement with Alexis and Delilah.

=== Story ===
Having vowed to end Delilah's experiments with the dead, Cain solves murders while periodically running into Jizabel and other members of Delilah. After encountering Mikaila, who professes her one-sided love for him and wants to become Suzette, he becomes obsessed with destroying the organization and learns that it is secretly building a memorial temple. Meanwhile, despite Jizabel's efforts to delay Riff's second, hidden, and cruel personality from awakening, the hypnosis suppressing it breaks. Riff later declares to Cain that he secretly works for Delilah: the loyal, kind-hearted Riff Cain had known is an alternative personality used to deceive others. Alexis had intended for Cain to develop a close bond with Riff, only to break it, to remind Cain that he is unloved. After Riff's departure, Cain resolves to confront Alexis and promises Mary that they will have a tea party after the conflict with Delilah ends. Led by Cassian, whose brain has been transplanted into an adult body, he reaches the tower within the temple where Alexis plans to sacrifice the brainwashed people of London to revive Augusta. Within the tower, Riff reveals his intent to overthrow Alexis. Unconcerned, Alexis divulges that Riff is Delilah's longest surviving doll and will soon die. Riff attacks Cain, but Riff's other personality resurfaces, causing him to deliberately shoot himself. Riff's loyal personality triumphs over the cruel one, but he and Cain are separated. Because Riff's wound cannot heal, Jizabel commits suicide so Riff can use his blood to briefly remain alive and return to Cain. Meanwhile, Cain successfully poisons his father and with his death, the tower begins to crumble. Cain, unable to escape and hurt by the falling debris, reunites briefly with Riff. However, the ceiling collapses and Riff tries to push him away. Cain embraces him, choosing to stay.

After Cain's disappearance, Mary becomes head of the Hargreaves. Augusta possesses Alexis, and seeks out Mary in the mausoleum Cain had built before leaving to confront Alexis. Augusta reveals that she manipulated Alexis into abusing his sons and trying to resurrect her for her amusement. Before she can kill Mary, Augusta triggers Cain's trap in the mausoleum and dies. Years later, Mary is married to Oscar and pregnant with their child, although she still waits for his return. Crehador, a medium close to Cain, sets up a tea party for Mary, fulfilling Cain's promise; he then reminisces on how he found Cain being held by Riff's corpse within the ruined tower. The bunkoban-exclusive epilogue expands the ending slightly. It shows an elderly Mary, who lies on her deathbed attended by a woman nearby and hears the laughter of Jizabel's ghost as he plays with his pet sheep. Sensing a presence nearby, she dies, and taking the form of her ten-year-old self, her soul joins Cain hand-in-hand at a tea party with their friends and loved ones—although they exist as spirits, a boy nearby can hear them.

== Development ==
Cain and Mary as they appear in Godchild. Yuki's art style in Godchild differs from her art in the previous part of the series. Yuki felt that Cain looked older than his intended age of seventeen in The Cain Saga.

Earl Cain was Kaori Yuki's first major manga series. Early in her career as a manga artist, Yuki had had difficulty selling her manga stories and had then switched genres to write romantic comedies, such as "Orange Time Bomb," following advice from older colleagues that she would not be successful with the kind of stories and illustrations she had previously been creating; after receiving increasingly favorable reader responses to a "dark" miniseries of hers, her editor decided that she should be writing similar stories. The next story concept that she pitched was Earl Cain. She chose the Victorian era as the setting because she liked films from that time period and was inspired by "the darker, grislier side" of the Victorian upper class. Yuki considered Kafka, a vampire-themed mystery which introduced the secret society led by the protagonist's father, to be the beginning of the series' plot. The "pretty risqué theme" of Kafka "embarrassed [her] at the time." After completing the first four parts of Earl Cain (Forgotten Juliet, The Sound of a Boy Hatching, Kafka, and The Seal of the Red Ram), Yuki was uncertain about continuing the series. She wrote her supernatural fantasy manga series Angel Sanctuary (1994–2000) and the chapter "Solomon Grundy's Sunday" as a "self-introduction" which convinced her to start Godchild.

Yuki did historical research for Godchild, traveling to London, England, and visiting seven historical sites: Westminster Abbey, Big Ben, the Tower of London, Windsor Castle, the British Museum, Thames River, and Hyde Park. Because of the gap of several years between the publication of the final The Seal of the Red Ram volume and the first Godchild volume, Yuki included the characters in order of previous appearance with past episodes, and short explanations in the first Godchild volume. Yuki noted that her drawing style differed from her previous series. The darker plot of Godchild worried Yuki, but helped her to decide the series' ending. Her method of creating suspense in Godchild included adding "lots" of black screentone, "exaggerating" the characters' expressions, having an elaborate setting, and opening the chapter with an everyday scene to contrast with the "scary scenes".

Yuki believed that the original story was unclear and added extra pages to clarify the twist ending of the series. Because of her decision, the ending chapter of Godchild was eight pages longer than the usual thirty pages for a manga. Yuki was divided between a happy or tragic ending for Cain, noting how readers of Angel Sanctuary had wanted a happy ending for the protagonists. She felt that the ending of Godchild was ambiguous as to whether Cain survived because there is neither blood nor a fatal wound on him. Yuki chose the final line of Godchild from the rhyme "Simple Simon", joking in the postscript that at least the series did not conclude with the line "And then there were none". As of finishing the series, Yuki said that she has no plans for additional chapters or side stories. Despite this, she included a five-page epilogue in the 2010 bunkoban release of the entire series.

=== Influences and cultural references ===
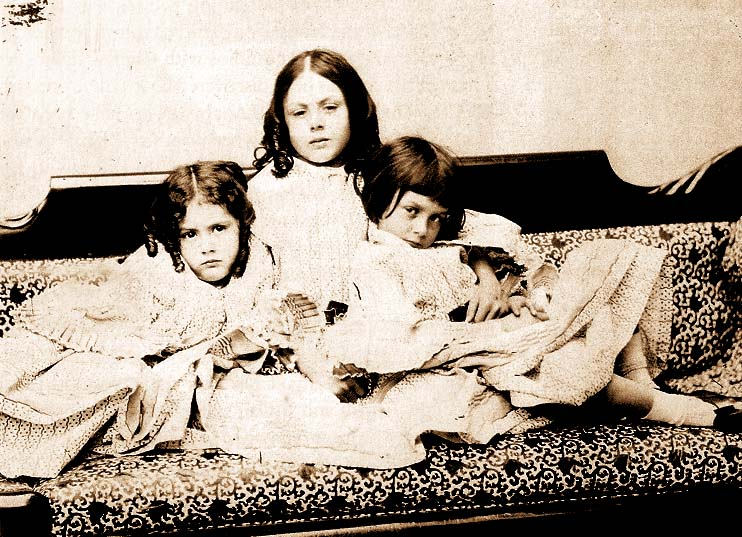
Cain's family name, Hargreaves, refers to Alice Liddell's married name. Carroll began Alice's Adventures in Wonderland as a story for Alice (right) and her sisters Edith (left) and Lorina (center).

Earl Cain contains references to real-life people and literary works. The first Godchild chapter, "Mad Tea Party", focuses on a mystery with elements from Lewis Carroll's 1865 novel Alice's Adventures in Wonderland, a work which Yuki has expressed her fondness for. Yuki's minor character, Victoria, was inspired by Carroll's character, the Queen of Hearts. Carroll's 1876 nonsense poem, The Hunting of the Snark, provided Yuki with the name of Jizabel's childhood pet, Snark. Additionally, the title of the third part of the series, Kafka, refers to the Austrian writer Franz Kafka, and a translation of the first line of his 1915 novella The Metamorphosis appears in the beginning of the volume. Yuki also based the story of Mikaila on the fairytale "Mermaid Princess". The chapter "Oedipal Blade" takes its name from the Greek character Oedipus Rex, who unknowingly killed his father and married his mother. Yuki also incorporates tales for children and lullabies into the mysteries of the series; for example, the chapter "Solomon Grundy's Sunday" uses the nursery rhyme "Solomon Grundy", while "The Twisted Fairy Tale" refers to the Brothers Grimm fairytale "The Juniper Tree". References to the bible also appear in the series. The protagonist shares his name with the murderer Cain, and Augusta is compared to Delilah by her father. Additionally, the series alludes to the story of the Kiss of Judas, in which Judas Iscariot betrays Jesus of Nazareth to Roman soldiers by identifying him through a kiss.

The influence of films is also seen in Earl Cain. As Yuki enjoys the American television series Twin Peaks (1990–1991), reviewers have noted its influence on Forgotten Juliet, the first part of Earl Cain. Yuki felt that two minor characters that appear in Forgotten Juliet, Maddi and Leland in the chapter "Branded Bibi", are reminiscent of the series. Yuki also drew inspiration from the film Young Sherlock Holmes (1985) for "The Boys Who Stopped Time", and based the appearance of Cain's aunt on Charlotte from A Room with a View (1985). In the chapter "Double", one of the characters shares his first name with the actor Emilio Estevez, and director Dario Argento served as the model for the antagonist. While there is no model for Cain, British actor Rupert Graves "left a strong impression" on her with his performance in A Room with a View. Additionally, Riff's name comes from The Rocky Horror Picture Show (1975), which Yuki considers a visual influence on her manga in general, along with the films Gothic (1986), The Legend of Billie Jean (1985), Aliens (1986), Lost Boys (1987), and Torch-song Trilogy (1988). Overall as a manga artist, Yuki has been influenced by Western films and MTV, which she watched in her youth.

== Themes ==
Reviewers have focused on a range of themes in Earl Cain. Noting "themes of incest and suicide" in the first four parts of the series, Thompson states that Godchild's portrayal of incest adheres to "a more classical tormented sense" which results in "guilt, madness, and the punishment of heaven" for the characters. According to Lori Henderson, reviewer and contributor to School Library Journal's blog Good Comics for Kids, Yuki frequently uses the "power of love" as a theme in her works; Godchild focuses on "the darker side of love" and its effects on the characters, although she writes that the manga does explore love as a source of empowerment. Henderson also notes the theme of betrayal present in the sixth volume. Writing for IGN, A.E. Sparrow writes that the "issues of beauty, loneliness, jealousy, and family ties" appear in the first volume of Godchild's mysteries. A French reviewer for Manga News wrote that the theme of "the soiled childhood" occurs throughout the series, depicted by abused children or children's items, such as dolls, pudding, and puppets, playing a role in some mysteries; the children's items appear either in the background as in "The Little Crooked House" or as a major part of the plot as in "Solomon Grundy's Sunday".

== Media ==
=== Manga ===
Written and illustrated by Kaori Yuki, Earl Cain is the collective name for Forgotten Juliet, The Sound of a Boy Hatching, Kafka, The Seal of the Red Ram, and the sequel series Godchild. The chapters of Forgotten Juliet and part of The Sound of a Boy Hatching appeared in the Japanese manga magazine Bessatsu Hana to Yume, beginning with the December 1991 issue; the chapters for the rest of The Sound of a Boy Hatching, Kafka, and The Seal of the Red Ram were serialized in Hana to Yume, from the eighth issue of 1993 to the twelfth issue of 1994, with an additional, self-contained chapter published in the seventeenth issue. The chapters of Forgotten Juliet, The Sound of a Boy Hatching, Kafka, and The Seal of the Red Ram were published in five tankōbon volumes by Hakusensha from July 17, 1992, to October 1994. Godchild appeared as a serial in the same manga magazine from the May 2001 issue to the October 2003 issue, and was published by Hakusensha in eight volumes from November 19, 2001, to January 16, 2004. Hakusensha later combined chapters from Forgotten Juliet, The Sound of a Boy Hatching, Kafka, and The Seal of the Red Ram into two volumes and published them from December 20, 2004, to January 28, 2005. Hakusensha also re-released the series in six bunkoban volumes from July 15, 2009, to March 16, 2010.

A new installment in the series, Godchild Ihо̄jin -Hakushaku Cain The Lost Story-, began its serialization in the online Hana Yume Ai manga magazine on January 20, 2026.

Viz Media licensed Earl Cain for an English-language release in North America. It serialized Godchild in its manga anthology Shojo Beat from the July 2005 issue through the June 2006 issue. It published the series' first volume on March 7, 2006; the final volume was released on February 5, 2008. Viz published Forgotten Juliet, The Sound of a Boy Hatching, Kafka, and The Seal of the Red Ram as The Cain Saga and released the first volume during the Godchild release, on October 3, 2006; the final volume was released on June 5, 2007. Earl Cain is also licensed for regional language releases in Germany and Sweden by Carlsen Comics, in Italy by Planet Manga, in Taiwan by Tong Li Publishing, in Spain by Glénat, and in France by Editions Tonkam. Godchild ran in multiple manga anthologies: the French Magnolia, the German Daisuki, and the Swedish Shojo Stars.

=== Drama CDs ===
On April 21, 1999, Geneon Entertainment released a drama CD titled Hakushaku Kain Shiriizu: Kafuka (伯爵カインシリーズ~カフカ). With music by Tomohiko Kira, it featured Hideo Ishikawa as Cain, Koyasu Takehito as Riff, Kawada Taeko as Mary Weather, Miki Shinichiro as Dr. Allen, and Jūrōta Kosugi as Alexis. The same company released a second drama CD, HCD Hakushaku Kain Shiriizu: Kirikizamareta Taberareta Miss Pudding no higeki (HCD伯爵カインシリーズ｢切り刻まれ食べられたミス·プディングの悲劇), on November 17, 1999. The drama CD featured Hideo Ishikawa, Kyoko Hikami, Takehito Koyasu, from Kafuka and included Taeko Kawada and Junko Asami.

== Reception ==
The Cain Saga received mixed reviews from critics. Manga Sanctuary awarded the French edition of the first volume five stars, describing it as "excellent." IGN's A. E. Sparrow described it as "a wonderful introduction to shojo manga for the uninitiated" and felt that both The Cain Saga and its sequel Godchild could "appeal to a very broad audience." The Book Report's Courtney Kraft praised the "fine attention to detail and aesthetics" of the art and liked the concept of murder mysteries based on children's rhymes and stories, commenting that Yuki "masters the art of creating a mystery."

Conversely, Mania Entertainment's Danielle Van Gorder considered the art "still much less refined than her later work in Angel Sanctuary," and commented on the amount of tragedy in the series. Manga News rated the first volume 15 out of 20, commenting that the male characters looked similar and had similar facial expressions in contrast to the more recognizable female ones. In Manga: The Complete Guide, Jason Thompson rated the series two and a half stars out of four, stating: "In its best moments, The Cain Saga captures the genuine ghoulishness of the Victorian era, or at least of its stereotypes." The Cain Saga was also criticized for scenes with "poorly organized" artwork, one-dimensional characters, predictable mysteries, and confusing plot, caused by the back-story and characters.

Conversely, the sequel, Godchild, received positive reviews. When the first chapter premiered in Shojo Beat, critics commented on the potential and art of the series, but found the chapter "listless" and confusing. Reviews of the bound volumes were positive. Writing for The Book Report, Robin Brenner described the mysteries as "unsettling, splatter-filled, and deliciously in line with the melodramatic, horrific traditions of Edgar Allan Poe and Mary Shelley." Leroy Douresseaux of Coolstreak Cartoons wrote: "By turns bizarre and unsettling, Godchild is actually quite engaging, but can be difficult to follow for those who didn't come in at the beginning". Writing for Sequential Tart, Sheena McNeil described Godchild as "a masterpiece in every sense of the word." In reviews of subsequent volumes, she lowered her score, and praised Yuki's characterization, mysteries, and artwork; she concluded: "Godchild is a fantastic and different story that can't be denied."

Critics praised the art of the series as detailed and distinct, with several noting the difference in the illustrations of The Cain Saga and Godchild. B. D. Gest's M. Natali wrote that "one senses immediately how the art of Kaori Yuki has evolved and improved since [The Cain Saga]". About.com's Deb Aoki placed the series on her recommended reading list of horror manga, commenting on the "ravishing" artwork and "lush gothic details." While describing the series as "the manga equivalent of Twizzlers" and the premise as "ahistoric and just plain silly," Katherine Dacey of Popculture Shock added, "Kaori Yuki's distinctive artwork and macabre sensibility make this overripe setup entertaining, even if the occasionally slangy dialogue and CSI-style forensics seem implausible in a Victorian London setting."

According to Publishers Weekly, Yuki's art consists of "startlingly odd angles and abrupt jumps from closeups to distant shots" with which she establishes "a giddy mood" that enables the readers to be sympathetic to the events. Although Yuki's character designs stuck to "certain shōjo conventions", they were seen as detailed and "perfect" for the mood of Godchild. Reviewers enjoyed the conclusion to the series, although one wanted a clearer fate for Cain and another commented on the "rushed" ending scenes. Godchild was also criticized for the characters' cruelty, Jizabel's disturbing back-story, and limited appeal of the series' universe.

== See also ==
- Black Butler, a similar Victorian-themed Gothic manga and anime series from 2006, partially inspired by Faust
