= List of Angel Sanctuary chapters =

The chapters of Angel Sanctuary were written and illustrated by Kaori Yuki. Angel Sanctuary appeared as a serial in the manga magazine Hana to Yume. Hakusensha collected and published the chapters in twenty tankōbon volumes from February 1995 to 19 February 2001. Hakusensha later re-released Angel Sanctuary in ten bunkoban volumes, from 14 June 2002, to 13 June 2003.

Angel Sanctuary is licensed by Viz Media for an English-language release in North America. Volume one was published 2004 and the final volume was released on 12 June 2007. Angel Sanctuary is also licensed for regional language releases in German by Carlsen Comics, in Italian by Panini Comics, in French by Editions Tonkam, and in Russia by Comix-art and Eksmo.

== Angel Sanctuary ==
No.	Title	Original release date	North American release date
01	Angels, Demons, And Sinners	February 1995; 4-592-12441-3	April 2004; 1-59116-245-9
02	Teen Angel	May 1995; 4-592-12442-1	June 2004; 1-59116-312-9
03	Heaven-Sent Terror	August 1995; 4-592-12443-X	10 August 2004; 1-59116-392-7
04	Nary An Angel/Setsuna In Hades	December 1995; 4-592-12840-0	2 November 2004; 1-59116-495-8
05	Angelfood Boy/The Path to Hell	April 1996; 4-592-12841-9	14 December 2004; 1-59116-576-8
06	Angels Rush In/One Hell Of A Journey	August 1996; 4-592-12842-7	8 February 2005; 1-59116-627-6
07	The Journey Continues	January 1997; 4-592-12843-5	12 April 2005; 1-59116-745-0
08	Where Angels Fear To Tread/On Earth As It Is In Heaven	April 1997; 4-592-12844-3	7 June 2005; 1-59116-799-X
09	Send Me An Angel/Blessed Art Thou	September 1997; 4-592-12845-1	9 August 2005; 1-59116-862-7
10	Angels On High/Place Of Torments	January 1998; 4-592-88500-7	11 October 2005; 1-4215-0058-2
11	Impenitence Of The Damned	May 1998; 4-592-12847-8	13 December 2005; 1-4215-0126-0
12	Holy War	September 1998; 4-592-12848-6	14 February 2006; 1-4215-0259-3
13	Holy War	December 1998; 4-592-12849-4	11 April 2006; 1-4215-0389-1
14	Prison in the Sky	April 1999; 4-592-12850-8	13 June 2006; 1-4215-0520-7
15	High Crimes	August 1999; 4-592-12851-6	8 August 2006; 1-4215-0521-5
16	Disorder in the Court	January 2000; 4-592-17666-9	10 October 2006; 1-4215-0522-3
17	Race to Destruction	April 2000; 4-592-17667-7	12 December 2006; 1-4215-0523-1
18	Heaven's Gate	June 2000; 4-592-17668-5	13 February 2007; 1-4215-0976-8
19	The Tablet	October 2000; 4-592-17669-3	10 April 2007; 1-4215-0977-6
20	The Apocalypse	February 2001; 4-592-17670-7	12 June 2007; 1-4215-0978-4

=== Japanese rerelease ===
No.	Release date	ISBN
01	14 June 2002	4-592-88491-4
02	14 June 2002	4-592-88492-2
03	13 September 2002	4-592-88493-0
04	13 September 2002	4-592-88494-9
05	13 December 2002	4-592-88495-7
06	13 December 2002	4-592-88496-5
07	14 March 2003	4-592-88497-3
08	14 March 2003	4-592-88498-1
09	13 June 2003	4-592-88499-X
10	13 June 2003	4-592-88500-7

== Angel Sanctuary: Tokyo Chronos ==
No.	Release date	ISBN
1	20 January 2023	978-4-592-21291-1
2	19 January 2024	978-4-592-21292-8
3	20 August 2024	978-4-592-21293-5
4	20 May 2025	978-4-592-21294-2
5	20 January 2026	978-4-592-21295-9
