= List of Angel Sanctuary soundtracks =

This is a list of soundtracks attributed to the drama CD and anime media types of the Japanese series Angel Sanctuary. Between 1999 and 2000 three CDs were released. The first was the soundtrack for the series of drama CDs, which cover the story of the Angel Sanctuary manga. The other two CDs were the soundtrack for the Angel Sanctuary OVA and the opening single for the OVA.

== Angel Sanctuary Sound Track ==
Angel Sanctuary Sound Track

Soundtrack album by Hikaru Nanase, Kuroyuri Shimai, Juri
- Released: April 21, 1999
- Genre: Drama CD soundtrack
- Length: 66:41

The Angel Sanctuary Sound Track was the first album released for the Angel Sanctuary series. It covers the BGM of the series of drama CDs and was released on April 21, 1999.

=== Track listing ===
#	English Title	Japanese Title		Time
#	English Title	Kanji	Romaji	Time
1.	"Prelude"	序章	Jyoshô	1:23
2.	"The Fall of the Rose ~ SANCTUS"	薔薇の失墜-SANCTUS-	Bara no Shittsui ~ SANCTUS	4:37
3.	"Inorganic Angel"	無機天使	Muki Tenshi	2:21
4.	"PAUL & LIESE"	PAUL&LIESE(黒百合姉妹)	PAUL & LIESE	3:42
5.	"Trouble"	苦悩	Kunô	1:01
6.	"Silent Sadness"	静かな悲しみ	Shizukana Kanashimi	1:37
7.	"Ruri's Heart"	翠雀の心	Midori no Kokoro	1:29
8.	"Sorrow"	悲嘆	Hitan	1:42
9.	"Black Ruby"	黒耀石(黒百合姉妹)	Kokuyô Seki	2:23
10.	"Supreme"	至高	Shikô	1:32
11.	"STELLA MARY"	STELLA MARY(黒百合姉妹)	STELLA MARY	4:52
12.	"Silent Mourning"	静謐な哀しみ	Seihitsuna Kanashimi	1:07
13.	"Solemnity"	荘厳	Sôgon	1:23
14.	"Trap of the Sky"	天空の罠	Tenkû no Wana	2:20
15.	"Sublime"	壮絶	Sôzetsu	4:36
16.	"Astral"	アストラル	Asutoraru	1:32
17.	"Awaken"	覚醒	Kakusei	0:43
18.	"Ancient Secret"	太古の神秘	Taiko no Shinpi	1:47
19.	"Gehenna Ruins"	ゲヘナ荒廃	Gehena Kôhai	1:44
20.	"Cruel Capture"	残酷な攻略	Zankokuna Kôryaku	1:52
21.	"Secret of Rebirth"	再生の神秘	Saisei no Shinpi	1:39
22.	"Sorrow"	悲哀	Hiai	2:30
23.	"Dragon Summon"	神龍召喚	Shinryû Shôkan	2:08
24.	"Reflection"	追想	Tsuisô	0:50
25.	"End in Despair"	絶望の果て	Zetsubô no Hate	2:07
26.	"Fear"	恐怖	Kyôfu	1:53
27.	"Burning Passion"	激しき情熱	Hageshiiki Jônetsu	2:44
28.	"Jibril"	ジブリール	Jiburiiru	0:57
29.	"Tragedy of Rebirth"	転生の悲劇	Tensei no Higeki	1:33
30.	"The Glorious Angel"	輝かしき天使	Kagayakashiki Tenshi	2:35
31.	"Rociel and Katan's Ties"	ロシエルとカタンの絆	Roshieru to Katan no Kizuna	1:38
32.	"Finally Hear the Memories of the Sunken World's Wings with Angels"	最後は天使と聴く沈む世界の翅の記憶(黒百合姉妹)	Saigo wa Tenshi to Kiku Shizumu Sekai no Hane no Kioku	2:24

== Angel Sanctuary OVA Original Sound Track ==
Angel Sanctuary OVA Original Sound Track

Soundtrack album by Hikaru Nanase, Yayoi Yula, Phi
- Released: August 23, 2000
- Genre: Anime soundtrack
- Length: 66:58

The Angel Sanctuary OVA Original Sound Track is the soundtrack to the OVA series of Angel Sanctuary and was first released on August 23, 2000.

=== Track listing ===
#	English Title	Japanese Title		Time
#	English Title	Kanji	Romaji	Time
1.	"Messiah (OVA Version)"	MESSIAH (OVAヴァージョン)(柚楽弥衣)	Messiah (OVA Version)	4:16
2.	"Rociel - Inorganic Angel"	ロシエル~無機天使	Roshieru ~ Muki Tenshi	2:32
3.	"Adam Kadamon" (אדם קדמון)	アダムカダモン	Adam Kadamon	2:16
4.	"Astral Power"	アストラルパワー	Asutoraru Pawa	2:18
5.	"Strange Space"	異空間	Ikyô Kan	1:51
6.	"Katan's Theme"	カタンのテーマ	Katan no Teema	2:09
7.	"Golemization"	ゴーレム化	Golem ka	2:34
8.	"Setsuna's Theme"	刹那のテーマ	Setsuna no Teema	3:56
9.	"Alexiel - Organic Angel"	アレクシエル~有機天使	Arekushieru ~ Yûki Tenshi	1:31
10.	"Forced Space"	迫りくる空間	Semariku Kûkan	1:54
11.	"Death of Kira's Father"	吉良の父の死	Kira no Chichi no Shi	2:36
12.	"What Rociel Wants"	ロシエルが求めるもの	Roshieru ga Motomeru Mono	2:01
13.	"Sara"	紗羅	Sara	1:40
14.	"Imaginary Space"	虚構空間	Kyokô Kûkan	3:01
15.	"Frightening Faceoff"	恐怖との対峙	Kobu to no Taiji	2:23
16.	"Sara's Determination"	紗羅の決意	Sara no Ketsui	1:24
17.	"Your Name is Messiah"	汝の名は救世主	Jono na wa Kyûseishu	1:21
18.	"Sanctus"	Sanctus	Sanctus	2:27
19.	"Ring's Theme"	指輪のテーマ	Yubiwa no Teema	1:39
20.	"Thoughts of Two"	二人の想い	Futari no Omoi	2:11
21.	"Premonition"	予感	Yokan	1:47
22.	"Sara's Death"	紗羅の死	Sara no Shi	2:04
23.	"Confusion"	とまどい	Tomadoi	1:45
24.	"Evening Scenery"	夕景	Yûkei	1:59
25.	"Separation"	別離	Betsuri	1:50
26.	"Illusions"	幻想	Gensô	1:26
27.	"Confusion"	とまどい	Tomadoi	1:41
28.	"Setsuna's Determination"	刹那の決意	Setsuna no Ketsui	2:17
29.	"Knife of Romance (OVA Version)"	KNIFE OF ROMANCE(OVAヴァージョン)	Knife of Romance (OVA Version)	2:43
30.	"Epilogue"	EPILOGUE	Epilogue	0:47

== Knife of Romance ==
"Knife of Romance" is a split single by Phi and Yayoi Yula. It includes the opening and ending theme for the Angel Sanctuary OVA. It was first released on May 24, 2000.

=== Track listing ===
#	English Title	Japanese Title		Time
#	English Title	Kanji	Romaji	Time
1.	"Knife of Romance"	KNIFE OF ROMANCE	KNIFE OF ROMANCE	4:43
2.	"Messiah"	MESSIAH	MESSIAH	4:17
3.	"Knife of Romance (off vocal)"	KNIFE OF ROMANCE (off vocal)	KNIFE OF ROMANCE (off vocal)	4:43
4.	"Messiah (instrumental)"	MESSIAH (インストゥルメンタル)	MESSIAH (instrumental)	4:17
