= Zabadak =

Zabadak may refer to:

- Zabadak! (song)
- Zabadak (band), Japanese band
