= Kaine (manga) =

Japanese manga by Kaoru Yuki

- The cover of the German translation, as published by Carlsen (2005)

カイネ die黒とlive白の脳内麻薬物質
- Genre: Thriller
- Manga
- Written by: Kaori Yuki
- Published by: Hakusensha
- Magazine: Bessatsu Hana to Yume, Hana to Yume
- Published: 18 October 1996
- Volumes: 1

Kaine: Endorphins – Between Life and Death (Note: Kaine die kuro to live shiro no nōnaimayaku busshitsu (Japanese: カイネ die黒とlive白の脳内麻薬物質)) is a shōjo manga written and illustrated by Kaori Yuki. It consists of four short stories: the titular story revolves around a boy who assumes the role of his deceased, rockstar twin, while "Magical Mystery Tour" focuses on a girl who wins a trip to Los Angeles and finds herself entangled in a plot to steal an inheritance. "Orange Time Bomb" deals with the interpersonal struggles of the members of the band Orange Bombs, and its sequel, "Tokyo Top," focuses on the band's singer pursuing an acting career and the love triangle that ensues among the actors.

The concept and characters for "Kaine" came together within a day, although page limitations later affected a few scenes and some character development. Yuki later expressed embarrassment at including "Orange Time Bomb," "Tokyo Top," and "Magical Mystery Tour" with "Kaine" because of their relative age: the three stories had variously appeared in the Japanese manga magazine Hana to Yume and its sister magazine Bessatsu Hana to Yume from 1988 to 1990, while "Kaine" had been a two-part serial in Hana to Yume in 1996. Nevertheless, publishing company Hakusensha later compiled the four stories into a bound volume and published it in October 1996; a re-release followed in September 2009. The collection has been translated into other languages, including French, Italian, and German. Critics generally enjoyed "Kaine" for its rock-music-inspired storyline, while the other three stories were seen as interesting for their status as works from the beginning of her career.

== Plot ==
"Kaine" follows Shinogu, the unassuming twin brother of the titular rockstar. Upon awakening, Shinogu discovers that the car accident that left him comatose killed Kaine, and he is thus forced by Kaine's manager, Oda, to assume Kaine's identity as a way for them to recoup the considerable costs associated with covering up Kaine's scandals. Shinogu comes to suspect that his twin was murdered, and with the help of Kaine's guitarist and high-school friend Die, he discovers that the band's success came not from hard work or talent, but a high induced in listeners by a secret message encoded in the CD, which eventually leads to suicide. The pair takes Oda to task over this revelation, and Shinogu agrees to one final concert for his brother's memory. Oda, however, schemes to have the two murdered to protect the company. Narrowly avoiding death, Die rescues Shinogu on stage, which triggers his repressed memories: "Shinogu" realizes that he has been Kaine the entire time. Unable to cope with his destructive upbringing and the demands of fame, he conspired to switch places with his twin, whom he envied for his carefree and innocent nature. Although Kaine was unable to go through with his plans to murder his twin, Shinogu died in the ensuing car accident and Kaine's body was mistaken for his. Kaine, finally remembering his past, then shoots himself on stage to Die's horror. The story ends with Kaine awakening in the hospital again to Die's presence: Die affirms that his past as Kaine was only a nightmare, while privately despairing that Kaine has always been able to control him.

"Magical Mystery Tour" centers on Saya Morikawa, a teenager who wins a trip to Los Angeles, California. Together with her guide, Minobu Kishida, she stays at the home of Takako Tojo, the company president's widow. There, Saya is troubled by warnings from a mysterious woman and is repeatedly mistaken for Takako's absent daughter, Shoko. As the story progresses, it is revealed that Minobu and Takako conspired to kill Shoko, who had inherited all of her father's property. When they failed to find her corpse to use as proof of her death, they then decided to kill Saya and substitute her corpse instead. Plagued by guilt, Minobu rescues Saya, and Shoko confronts them, having enlisted Saya's help. Takako and Minobu are arrested, and Saya returns to Japan, dreaming of her return to Los Angeles and all the sightseeing to do there.

"Orange Time Bomb" opens with Jam, a young girl who has collided with Tatsumi, the teenage guitarist and lyricist of the band Orange Bombs. In accidentally knocking off his sunglasses, she discovers his secret: without them, he blushes in the presence of women. While Tatsumi and Guy clash over their shared workload, Jam eventually tracks Tatsumi down and threatens to reveal his secret unless he goes out with her. They eventually bond over shared memories of their pasts, and later on, Guy embraces Jam, wishing to break the two of them apart; in doing so, he is photographed by a paparazzo. Guy and Tatsumi reconcile over their efforts to obtain the camera, which is eventually destroyed.

"Tokyo Top," the sequel short story of "Orange Time Bomb," follows Guy as he acts along with Satsuki, a headstrong singer, on the set of a science-fiction film. Satsuki ends up in a love triangle with Guy and another actor, the womanizing, arrogant Ibe. When she learns about Ibe's scheme to have Guy beaten up during the filming of a scene, she rushes to intercede, fighting off his attackers. She confesses her love for him and her fears that he could never love her because she is strong-willed. The story closes with them attending a screening together.

== Development and publication ==
The concept and characters for "Kaine" came together within a day. Due to page limitations and deadlines, manga artist Kaori Yuki was unable to flesh out some of the characters, something she regretted in the afterword. She thought that, because of this, some characters were unintentionally comedic. She also noted how the page limitations affected the scenes where Kaine escapes being murdered by Oda or when he sings at the concert in the climax. Die was her favorite character to draw, and in the original ending, she had intended for him to go mad. Although she visited a music studio to gather impressions for "Kaine," she did not use any of them, nor did she use a model for any of the characters.

Yuki expressed her embarrassment at including the other three stories within the collection, due to their status as very early works. In her retrospective on "Magical Mystery Tour," she thought that the art was "amateurish." "Orange Time Bomb" is from the early point in her career when she wrote romantic-comedy manga. She had been having difficulty selling her manga stories, and an older colleague had advised her that she would not be successful with the particular stories and illustrations she had been pursuing. She then switched genres to romantic comedy, and although she had a few stories published, she was unhappy. It was not until she wrote a "dark, scary" miniseries with increasingly favorable reader responses that her editor told her to pursue similar stories. Her success with the next manga she wrote, The Cain Saga, convinced her that "dark" stories and the Gothic genre were most suitable for her style and potential. At the time she was writing "Tokyo Top," she was into European rock music and took inspiration from that.

Cultural references to films and music can be found within the short story collection: the title of "Tokyo Top" comes from the film Tokyo Pop (1988), and visual allusions to The Rocky Horror Picture Show (1976) appear near the manga's ending. Additionally, the title of "Orange Time Bomb" has been suggested to be an allusion to the novel A Clockwork Orange (1962) and its related film, while "Magical Mystery Tour" might be a reference to the Beatles album of the same name (1967).

"Tokyo Top" appeared in the first issue of the Japanese manga magazine Hana to Yume for 1989, while "Orange Time Bomb" and "Magical Mystery Tour" were published in its sister manga magazine Bessatsu Hana to Yume in 1988 and 1990, respectively. "Kaine" was serialized in the sixth and seventh issues of Hana to Yume in 1996. The stories were compiled into a bound volume by Hakusensha and published on 18 October 1996. It was later republished on 15 September 2009. It has been translated into other languages, including French by Tonkam, Italian by Panini Comics, and German by Carlsen Comics.

== Reception ==
Critics generally singled out "Kaine" as the highlight of the collection, citing the intriguing narrative centered around rock music. One reviewer for Manga Sanctuary remarked that, despite the lack of depth in some characters, "Kaine" was among some of Yuki's best manga, complemented by her artwork and a "sublime ending." Planete BD's Faustine Lillaz enjoyed the story's premise, art, and character designs, but wrote that the resulting plot was unnecessarily convoluted and would have benefited from more pages to fully flesh the events out. Conversely, the other reviewer for Manga Sanctuary interpreted the narrative of Kaine as a cliché-filled caricature with art that, while better than the majority of other shōjo manga, was serviceable.

The other three stories received a range of reactions, with their age relative to "Kaine" often remarked upon. Some critics wrote that they were interesting historical artifacts from Yuki's beginnings as a manga artist. According to the reviewer for Manga News, the short story format and artwork was reminiscent of The Cain Saga, and the stories themselves were "refreshing." Planete BD, however, regarded the stories as amateur and uninteresting.
