= Innocent Bird =

Japanese manga series

- Innocent Bird: Volume 2 USA Cover

名も無き鳥の飛ぶ夜明け (The Dawn the Nameless Bird will Fly)
- Genre: Yaoi, Drama, Romance
- Manga
- Written by: Hirotaka Kisaragi
- Published by: Kadokawa Publishers
- English publisher: NA: BLU
- Original run: April 5, 2002 – March 25, 2004
- Volumes: 3

Innocent Bird, known in Japan as or The Dawn the Nameless Bird will Fly (名も無き鳥の飛ぶ夜明け, Na mo Naki Tori no Tobu Yoake), is a Japanese manga by Hirotaka Kisaragi, which has been licensed and is currently being published in English by Harper Collins Canada / Tk Blu Man Adu. All three volumes are currently available in English.

== Plot ==
Karasu is an angel of the class Powers; Shirasagi is a demon, a Marquis. One day Karasu is assigned to convince Shirasagi to return to Hell. However, Shirasagi doesn't act like a demon at all—not only is he a priest, but he's forsworn the use of his demonic powers, and wishes nothing more than to live his life as a human. But the Archduke of Hell also has his eyes set on Shirasagi, and Karasu's own deviant behavior soon throws him out of God's favor. Will the pair be able to overcome the restrictions and laws of being an angel and a demon and live their lives freely?

== Characters ==
Karasu (からす)
He is a jaded angel of the class Powers. His first assignment was to convince Shirasagi that he should return to Hell. But he realized the odd personality within Shirasagi, as Shirasagi tends to not behave or do anything that relates as a demon. Confounded by this discovery, Karasu becomes more attached to Shirasagi, and wants to protect and stay with him at all times.
Shirasagi (しらさぎ)
He is a demon of the priest class who seeks redemption. One day, when Karasu approached him and tried to convince him to go back to Hell, Shirasagi refused and explained that he wanted to be human. He forsworn the use of his demonic powers and wishes nothing more than to live his life as a human.

== Volumes ==
No.	Original release date	Original ISBN	English release date	English ISBN
1	April 5, 2002	4-04-853488-2	March 13, 2007	1-59816-831-2
2	April 10, 2003	4-04-853608-7	July 10, 2007	1-59816-832-0
3	March 25, 2004	4-04-853731-8	November 13, 2007	1-59816-833-9

== Reception ==
Holly Ellingwood of Active Anime describes the setting of the story as "Gothic", reminiscent of Angel Sanctuary, and the conclusion of the story as "incredible" and "captivating".
