= Fairy Cube =

Japanese manga series by Kaoru Yuki

- North American cover of the first volume featuring Ainsel

妖精標本 (Yōsei Hyōhon)
- Genre: Dark fantasy
- Manga
- Written by: Kaori Yuki
- Published by: Hakusensha
- English publisher: NA: Viz Media; SG: Chuang Yi
- Magazine: Hana to Yume
- Original run: February 2005 – 2006
- Volumes: 3

Fairy Cube (Japanese: 妖精標本, Hepburn: Yōsei Hyōhon) is a Japanese manga series written and illustrated by Kaori Yuki. Appearing as a serial in Hakusensha's shōjo manga (targeted towards girls) magazine Hana to Yume from February 2005 to 2006, the Fairy Cube chapters were collected into three bound volumes and published from October 2005 to July 2006. A related short story, "Psycho Knocker", appeared in the October 2004 issues of the same magazine. Yuki began Fairy Cube with the intent of writing a shorter manga. Set in a fictional universe in which a fairy-inhabited Otherworld exists alongside present-day Earth, the series focuses on Ian Hasumi, a teenager who can see fairies, and his childhood friend Rin. After Ian's body is stolen from him, he starts on a journey to reclaim it and soon finds himself in conflict with a group of fairies who hope to capture the Earth by opening a pathway from the Otherworld.

Viz Media licensed Fairy Cube for an English-language release in North America. It previewed the series in its manga anthology Shojo Beat and released the series from May 2008 to November 2008. A digital edition was published in 2011. Another English translation has been published by Chuang Yi in Singapore, and the series has been translated into several other languages. The series received a range of reviews: reviews of the first volume were generally positive, although the reviewers differed in their thoughts on the conclusion. The final volume placed in ICv2's list of the top 300 bestselling graphic novels for November 2008.

== Plot ==
Fairy Cube takes place in a fictional universe in which an Otherworld, inhabited by a variety of fairies and other nonhuman entities, exists alongside present-day Earth. The series focuses on Ian Hasumi (羽住 衣杏, Hasumi Ian), a timid fifteen-year-old who sees fairies—invisible to normal people—and is stalked by Tokage (トカゲ, Tokage), a spiteful spirit only he can see. In his backstory, it is revealed that his mother, Kureha Hasumi (羽住 呉葉, Hasumi Kureha), left, causing his novelist father, Kazumi Hasumi (羽住 一巳, Hasumi Kazumi), to burn wing marks on Ian's back to prevent him from doing the same. Rin Ishinagi (石椛 鈴, Ishinagi Rin), Ian's abused childhood friend and secret "crush", later returns to the city where he lives after being separated for years. Stumbling upon the scene of a murder and seeing a man retrieve a cube from the victim's body, Ian follows him back to an antique shop, where the man, actually a Gancanagh named Kaito (界外), gives him Tokage's fairy cube—a cube belonging to a fairy that can allow the fairy to take over the human who has it. Soon after, Ian is killed by his own father, who was manipulated by Tokage, and now exists as a spirit, with Tokage possessing his body. Returning to Kaito's shop and after a trip through the Otherworld with Ainsel (エインセル, Einseru), a small yet powerful and vicious fairy in love with Kaito, Ian takes control of the body of a deceased young boy, Eriya Barnett (エリヤ・バレット, Eriya Barutto). (Note: Eriya is named Elijah in the Chuang Yi translation.) Moved by his determination, Ainsel agrees to aid him in his quest to regain his body.

Along the way, Ian encounters his maternal aunt Lise (梨世, Rise), a leanan sídhe like Kureha, who explains that Kureha left before she completely drained the life force of Kazumi; Shira Gotoh (神門 姿良, Gotō Shira), a cross-dressing girl born in the Otherworld who, as the chairperson for the multi-million land development company Gotoh Group, aims to restore the environment for the fairies; and Raven (レイヴン, Reivan), Shira's supernatural bodyguard whose clan guards a "demon door". Additionally, Ian learns that Tokage grew up in the Otherworld, abandoned by his parents Kureha and Kazumi, but loved by a non-native fairy; when his village tried to sacrifice him to the god of war and death, he slaughtered them and the god escaped. To infiltrate Gotoh Group, Rin allows herself to be captured, and under the pretense of a beauty contest, the company plans to harvest the energy of the fairy cubes and bystanders to open a "demon door" to the Otherworld. Ian rescues Rin, and the fairy god Balor is revealed to be inhabiting the body of Shira's bedridden father and behind the plan. Ian eventually returns to his body through fairy magic, while Eriya's body accepts Tokage. Having been held captive by Gotoh for most of the series, Kureha appears and before dying, reveals that Tokage is Ian's stillborn twin. Shira is killed after cutting Balor's life-line, and Raven realizes that his fiancée, whom Kaito had seduced, had actually unsealed the demon door prior to the start of the series, angry with the two for playing with her feelings. Ainsel, secretly the consciousness of the door's sealing spell, and Kaito die together as a sacrifice to seal the demon door, as Ian and Rin help by letting the people of earth glimpse the fairies and using the energy of their belief.

== Development ==
Kaori Yuki's earlier, related short manga "Psycho Knocker" appeared in the October 2004 issues of Hakusensha's shōjo manga (targeted towards girls) magazine Hana to Yume, published twice a month. It focuses on a pessimistic, heartbroken teenager who makes a pact with a lonely ghost, unknowingly exchanging her life for two wishes. Chasing down spirits that have escaped from the demon door, Raven and Tokage rescue her from the ghost, a young girl who died suddenly, and seal a spirit which feeds on negative emotions. Yuki wrote the story as a reminder to herself not to be so pessimistic, a trait she shares with the teenage protagonist.

Yuki started Fairy Cube with the goal of writing a short series. Because of the story's nature as a serial, she faced page limitations. When deciding on the ending, she considered having Ian and Rin as the sacrifice to close the demon door, but rejected it, feeling that it would be too unpleasant for the readers, although she expressed her fondness for sad endings. She was also unable to include Ian and Tokage's newfound friendship, because Rin and Ian's romantic relationship served as the focus of the story.

== Release ==
The eighteen chapters of Fairy Cube appeared as a serial in Hakusensha's shōjo manga magazine Hana to Yume from February 2005 to 2006. Hakusensha collected the chapters into three bound volumes and published them from October 19, 2005, to July 19, 2006.

At the 2007 Comic-Con International, a convention held in San Diego, California, Viz Media announced that it had licensed Fairy Cube for an English-language release in North America. Viz included a preview of Fairy Cube in the April 2008 issue of its manga anthology Shojo Beat, and published the series from May 6, 2008, to November 4, 2008. A digital edition of the series was also released in 2011. The series is also licensed in Singapore by Chuang Yi, and published in several other languages, among them German, Italian, and French.

=== Volume list ===
No.	Title	Original release date	North American release date
1	Rebirth	October 19, 2005; 4592183517	May 6, 2008; 1-4215-1668-3
Chapters 1–7
2	Crown of Thorns	February 17, 2006; 4592183525	August 5, 2008; 1-4215-1669-1
Chapters 8–14
3	The Last Wing	July 19, 2006; 4592183533	November 4, 2008; 1-4215-1670-5
Chapters 15–18; "Psycho Knocker"

== Reception ==
The final volume placed at the 221st spot on ICv2's list of the top 300 bestselling graphic novels for November 2008, with an estimated 516 copies sold.

Writing for School Library Journal, Cara von Wrangel Kinsey found Fairy Cube "more accessible than Yuki's previous works," despite covering subjects such as murder and revenge. A. E. Sparrow of IGN gave the first volume a favorable review, enjoying the series' different view of the fairies. Mania Entertainment's Danielle Van Gorder wrote that the story reminded her of the pre-Victorian version of the fairytale "Snow White" or the British Sidhe fairies, in her review of the first volume. Van Gorder worried that the cover would mislead readers into believing that it was "a light and fluffy kind of story" and drive away the target audience. In a follow-up review of the final volume, she wrote that the conclusion of the series was less confusing than that of Yuki's earlier work Angel Sanctuary (1994–2000) and thought the story was "well-executed," though it still had some flaws. Rating the series 3 out of 4 stars, Jason Thompson, author of Manga: The Complete Guide (2007), wrote that while it reminded him of Angel Sanctuary, it covered "more original subject matter" and had "tighter" plotting. Anime News Network's Casey Brienza highly recommended the first volume, praising her inclusion of Celtic mythology. She enjoyed the plot and described the cover as beautiful, though she disliked the artistic inconsistencies caused by Yuki's use of assistants. According to Katherine Dacey of PopCultureShock in her review of the first volume, the story succeeded through Yuki's use of "outlandish touches," creating "an intoxicating—if occasionally ridiculous—mix of horror, romance, and revenge." In her review of the final volume, Dacey expressed her feelings of annoyance that the characters spent much of the volume talking with very little action, and wrote that the story, despite a promising start, went downhill with the introduction of the beauty contest in the second volume. Categorizing "Psycho Knocker" as "comeuppance theater," she enjoyed it more than Fairy Cube's conclusion, though still wrote that "it isn't her best work." A reviewer of the French edition disliked how quickly the story progressed, commenting that the protagonists' personalities were not fully explored as a result. The reviewer praised the covers of the first and third volumes as "magnificent".
