= Nanpei Yamada =

Japanese manga author (born 1972)

Nanpei Yamada 山田南平
- Born: September 2, 1972 (age 54) Kanagawa Prefecture, Japan
- Areas: Character design, writer, manga artist
- Notable works: Kōcha Ōji

Nanpei Yamada (山田南平, Yamada Nanpei; born September 2, 1972 in Kanagawa Prefecture, Japan) is a Japanese manga author. As of 2018 her latest series, Sakura no Hana no Kōcha Ōji (Tea Prince of Cherry Blossoms) is being serialized in Bessatsu Hana to Yume.

== Works ==
- Kumiko & Shingo Series (1990–1997, 15 volumes)
- Kōcha Ōji (1997–2004, 25 volumes)
- Kōcha Ōji no Himegimi (2006, 1 volume)
- Otona no Kodomotachi: Kumiko & Shingo Series Special (2002–2007, 1 volume)
- Manabiya Sannin Kichisa (2004–2006, 4 volumes)
- Skyblue Shore (Sorairo Kaigan) (2006–2008, 6 volumes) - first two volumes were released in English by Tokyopop
- Orange Chocolate (2009-2014, 13 volumes)
- Sakura no Hana no Kōcha Ōji (2013-, 11 Volumes (Ongoing))
