= Grand Guignol Orchestra =

Japanese manga series by Kaori Yuki

- Cover of the first volume published by Hakusensha in Japan on February 19, 2009, depicting Lucille

人形宮廷楽団
- Genre: Horror
- Manga
- Written by: Kaori Yuki
- Published by: Hakusensha
- English publisher: AUS: Madman Entertainment; NA: Viz Media
- Magazine: Bessatsu Hana to Yume
- Original run: August 2008 – June 2010
- Volumes: 5

Grand Guignol Orchestra (Japanese: 人形宮廷楽団, Hepburn: Guignol Kyūtei Gakudan) is a gothic horror shōjo (targeted towards girls) manga series written and illustrated by Kaori Yuki. Appearing as a monthly serial in the Japanese manga magazine Bessatsu Hana to Yume from the August 2008 issue to the June 2010 issue, the eighteen chapters of Grand Guignol Orchestra were collected into five bound volumes by Hakusensha—together with Yuki's romantic one-shot manga "Camolet Garden", which had appeared in the April 2008 issue—and published from February 2009 to August 2010. Set in a world where a worldwide epidemic of a virus has turned part of the population into guignols (zombies which resemble marionettes), Grand Guignol Orchestra focuses on singer Lucille and his orchestra, which destroys the guignols through music.

At the 2009 New York Anime Festival, Viz Media announced that it had licensed the series for an English-language translation. It published the series under its Shojo Beat imprint, from October 2010 to December 2011. The series has also been translated into other languages, such as German and Mandarin. Grand Guignol Orchestra has been positively received by English-language readers, with three volumes placing on the list of the top 300 bestselling graphic novels. The series has received a range of reviews from English-language critics. Yuki's illustrations and premise were generally well-received, with criticism of the series focused on the narrative and page layouts.

== Plot ==
=== Setting ===
Manga artist Kaori Yuki has described the setting of Grand Guignol Orchestra as the "Middle Ages (sort of) with a French air." The series takes place in a fictional universe, where a worldwide epidemic of a virus, the Galatea Syndrome (ガラテイア症候群, Garateia Shoukougun), has turned part of the population into guignols (ギニョール, Giniyōru), zombies which resemble marionettes. Certain types of music can restore humanity and memories to the guignols while speeding up their destruction; the queen's Grand Orchestra destroys guignols through music, as does the much smaller, unofficial Grand Orchestra. If an area becomes more than seventy percent infected by the virus, the queen sends her Divine Lightning (神雷, Kami Kaminari) to destroy the area and keep the virus from spreading. The virus, however, originates from the first queen, whose father transformed her into a guignol; subsequent queens and their potential successors are grown from her cells. Opposed to the queen's rule is Le Sénat: consuls Richter (リチテライツ, Richiteraitu) and Valentine (バレンチナイツ, Barentinaitu), chancellor Meerschaum (ミアシャム, Miatsuyamu), and regent Jasper (ジャスパー, Jayasupā), all of whom have been governing for a century.

=== Story ===
The plot follows the unofficial Grand Orchestra led by singer Lucille (ルチル, Ruchiru), (Note: The genders of Lucille, Cordie, and Berthier—all born lacking "a clearly defined gender"—are influenced by their "development and psychological state." Berthier takes on a male form after falling in love with Lucille; Berthier and Lucille, who resumes a male form at the conclusion of the series, are referred to with male personal pronouns (e.g. he, him) by other characters. Cordie is referred to with female personal pronouns (e.g. she, her) by other characters.) who searches for a way to rescue his younger sister Cordierite "Cordie" (コーディアライト, Kodiaraito)—who now despises him as the cold-hearted Queen Gemsilica, convinced that he tricked her into becoming queen in his place. The other members include the violence-prone violinist Kohaku (コハク), who was bitten by a guignol; and cellist Gwindel "Gwin" (グィンデル, Guwinderu), a former sculptor of guignols who keeps his daughter's hedgehog with him. They are soon joined by pianist Celestite "Celes" (セレスタイト, Seresutaito), who has lived under the identity of her twin brother, Elestial "Eles" (エレスチャル, Eresutiaru) after a guignol attack left her the only surviving child in her town. They periodically encounter Berthier (ベルチェ, Beruchie), the unofficial orchestra's former pianist whose violence drove his beloved, Lucille, away and who was resurrected by Le Sénat after his suicide. Other reoccurring characters include Spinel (スピネル, Supineru), a spy for the queen who can manipulate her voice and whom Lucille befriended when she snuck into the all-male monastery as a child.

The unofficial orchestra visits infected towns and destroys the guignols there for a fee. Eventually, they obtain the Black Oratorio (黒の聖譚曲, Kuro no Hijiri Tan Kyoku), rumoured to be able to destroy the queen and neutralize the virus when performed. Having left Eles behind for her own protection and unaware that she took the Black Oratorio out of fear of its effects on the orchestra, Lucille and his orchestra confront Queen Gemsilica, and find Berthier with a kidnapped Eles and the Black Oratorio. Queen Gemsilica is fatally wounded by their servant Cookiete "Cook" (クーク石, Kukitu). Secretly the host of the original king, Cook is responsible for the manipulation that caused her to become queen instead of Lucille. Berthier, persuaded to return the Black Oratorio, kills Cook as he attempts to escape, and the music of the Black Oratorio is broadcast throughout the world by the satellites formerly used for Divine Lightning. Upon hearing the music, the guignols sing along and are destroyed. Separated from Lucille and the orchestra, Eles realizes that she can live as herself now. Later, she joyfully reunites with Lucille, and rejoins the unofficial orchestra, all of whom have been affected by the neutralization of the virus.

== Development ==
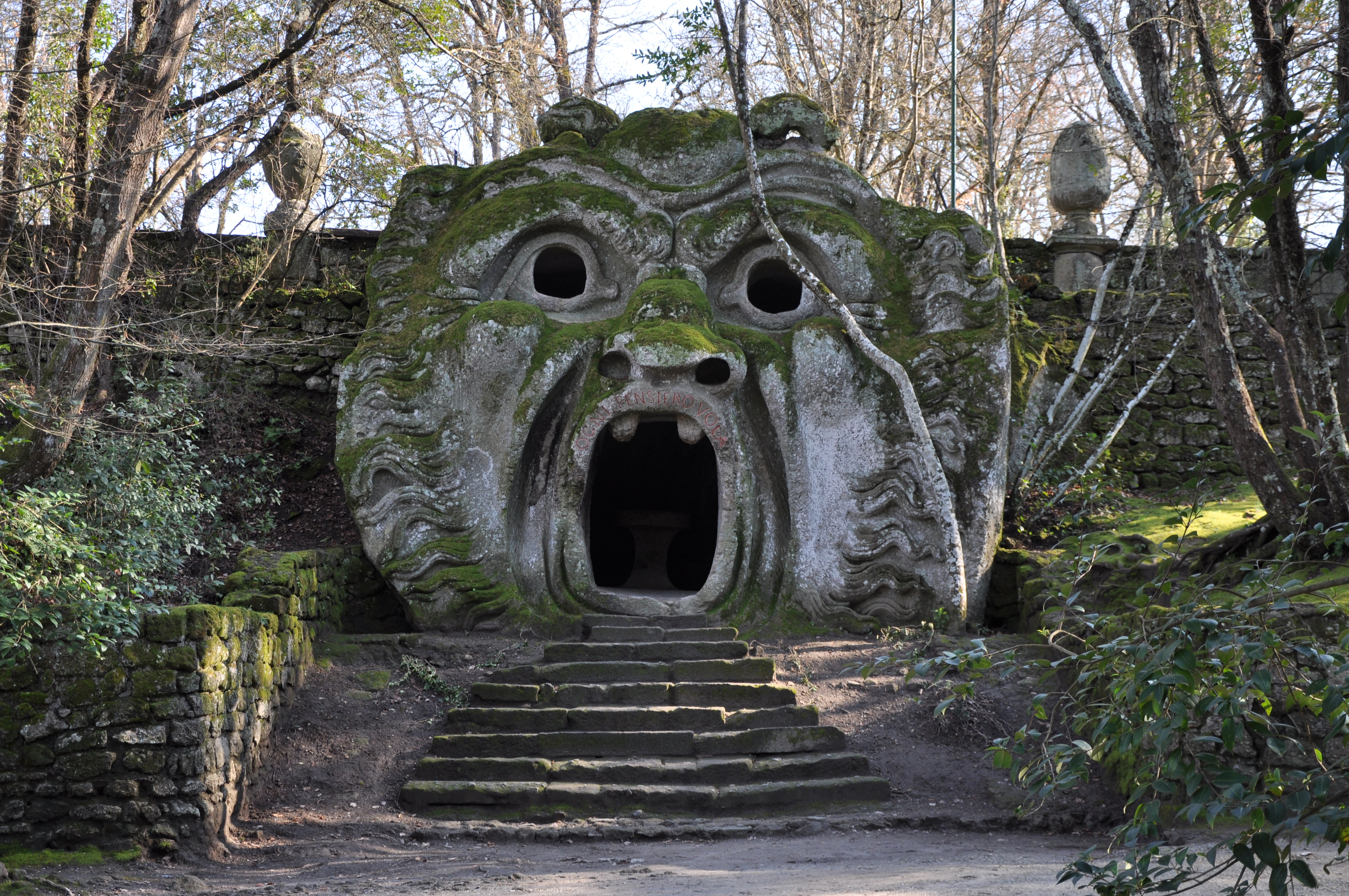
A sculpture from the Park of the Monsters in Bomarzo, Italy. The park served as the model for the garden which appears in Lucille's memories of his childhood.

Yuki noted that the title of the series was potentially misleading, as the orchestra is not composed of guignols; she chose the word "guignol"—which describes hand puppets, not marionettes—for its sound. Page limitations affected the roles of Kohaku and Carnelian, Lucille's castrato rival, although she felt that the story still ended as she had planned it. She also faced difficulty with Berthier's character design. Initially, she planned to have him appear in a "full-body animal suit" costume, but decided against the idea as "too comical." One of his early character designs was used for a minor character, an assassin for Le Sénat.

Included with the bound-volume release of Grand Guignol Orchestra is "Camolet Garden", Yuki's 92-page romantic one-shot manga originally published in the April 2008 issue of the monthly shōjo (targeted towards girls) manga magazine Bessatsu Hana to Yume. It focuses on Ryū, who finds himself in a boys' dormitory, where its inhabitants have ranks corresponding to a deck of playing cards. He struggles to solve the mystery of the boys' dormitory, closed off from the outside world and where death only results in rebirth. In it, Yuki made allusions to the Victorian poem "The Lady of Shalott" by the English poet Alfred, Lord Tennyson. In retrospective, she felt that its setting was "not really the best," and the many characters presented some difficulty in remembering.

== Release ==
Written and illustrated by Kaori Yuki, Grand Guignol Orchestra appeared as a serial in Bessatsu Hana to Yume from the August 2008 issue, to the June 2010 issue. Hakusensha collected the eighteen chapters into five bound volumes, and released them from 19 February 2009, to 19 August 2010.

At the 2009 New York Anime Festival, Viz Media announced that it had licensed the series and would publish the series under its Shojo Beat imprint. Viz Media published the series from 5 October 2010, to 6 December 2011. It also released a digital version of the series. The series is distributed by Madman Entertainment in Australasia (Australia and New Zealand). It has also been translated into other languages, among them German, Italian, French, and Mandarin.

=== Volume list ===
No.	Original release date	Original ISBN	English release date	English ISBN
01	19 February 2009	978-4-59-218661-8	5 October 2010 (NA); 10 November 2010 (AUS)	1-4215-3636-6
Opus 1. "Overture For Sleepless Dolls I" (眠れぬ人形のための序曲 I, "Nemurenu Ningyô no Tame no Jokyoku I"); Opus 2. "Overture For Sleepless Dolls II" (眠れぬ人形のための序曲 II, "Nemurenu Ningyô no Tame no Jokyoku II"); Opus 3. "The Captive Nightingale I" (囚われの小夜鳴鳥 I, "Toraware no Sayonakidori I"); Opus 4. "The Captive Nightingale II" (囚われの小夜鳴鳥 II, "Toraware no Sayonakidori II")
02	17 July 2009	978-4-59-218662-5	1 February 2011 (NA); 10 March 2011 (AUS)	1-4215-3637-4
Opus 5. "The Queen and The Jester I" (女王陛下と宮廷道化師 I, "Joô-heika to Kyûtei Dôkeshi I"); Opus 6. "The Queen and The Jester II" (女王陛下と宮廷道化師 II, "Joô-heika to Kyûtei Dôkeshi II"); Opus 7. "Tragédie Lyrique I" (音楽悲劇 I, "Ongaku Higeki I"); Opus 8. "Tragédie Lyrique II" (音楽悲劇 II, "Ongaku Higeki II")
03	18 December 2009	978-4-59-218663-2	7 June 2011 (NA); 10 July 2011 (AUS)	1-4215-3797-4
Opus 9. "Tragédie Lyrique III" (音楽悲劇 III, "Ongaku Higeki III"); Opus 10. "Ma Chérie I" (マ・シェリI, "Ma Shieri I"); Opus 11. "Ma Chérie II" (マ・シェリII, "Ma Shieri II"); Opus 12. "Ma Chérie III" (マ・シェリIII, "Ma Shieri III")
04	19 May 2010	978-4-59-218664-9	6 September 2011 (NA); 10 October 2011 (AUS)	1-4215-3872-5
Opus 13. "Stigmate" (ステイグマ, "Suteiguma"); Opus 14. "Quatuor Mosaiques I" (クオーター四重奏 I, "Kuota Shijûsô I"); Opus 15. "Quatuor Mosaiques II" (クオーター四重奏 II, "Kuota Shijûsô II"); Opus 16. "Troubadour's Love Song I" (宮廷吟遊詩人の愛の歌 I, "Kyûtei Gin'yûkajin no Ai no Uta I")
05	19 August 2010	978-4-59-218665-6	6 December 2011 (NA); 10 February 2012 (AUS)	1-4215-3960-8
Opus 17. "Troubadour's Love Song II" (宮廷吟遊詩人の愛の歌 II, "Kyûtei Gin'yûkajin no Ai no Uta II"); Opus 18. "Troubadour's Love Song III" (宮廷吟遊詩人の愛の歌 III, "Kyûtei Gin'yûkajin no Ai no Uta III"); "Camelot Garden" (キャメロット・ガーデン, "Kyamerotto Gāden")

== Reception ==
Grand Guignol Orchestra was positively received by English-language readers. Three volumes appeared on the list of the 300 bestselling graphic novels. The first volume sold 464 copies and appeared at the 256th spot in October 2010; it reached the fifteenth spot in BookScan's list of the twenty bestselling graphic novels for September 2011. The second volume sold an estimated 334 copies, and appeared at the 265th spot for February 2011. The fifth volume sold an estimated 297 copies, and appeared at the 267th spot.

Writing for School Library Journal's blog Good Comics for Kids, Snow Wildsmith reviewed the first volume positively, and wrote, "The elements her fans adore are all there: beautiful characters, gender ambiguity, horror themes, blood and gore, and, of course, gorgeous costumes." According to Wildsmith, the unexplained aspects of the plot helped to create interest for the readers. David Welsh of Comic World News had more mixed feelings about the first volume; although he praised the aesthetic, premise, translation, and guignols, he wrote that Yuki's work would be more appealing "if she could just strike that balance between creative focus and intellectual abandon and emotional shamelessness." About.com's Deb Aoki reviewed it negatively, criticizing its plot. Aoki wrote that it would only appeal to fans of Yuki. While finding aspects of the setting and costume design historically confusing and trying on the reader's suspension of disbelief, Rebecca Silverman of Anime News Network wrote that the Gwin's backstory, the quick pacing, Yuki's detailed art, and her frightening portrayal of zombies made the third volume "a winning entry in an already fascinating series." Silverman had mixed feelings about the dense page layouts: according to her, they contributed to the narrative suspense, although they affected the reader's ability to easily read the volume in places. In her review of the fourth volume, Silverman praised the character development and Yuki's ability to create mysteries, although she wrote that not all readers would enjoy the numerous plot twists. She also suggested the possibility of a metaphor for the French Revolution in the series. Another reviewer for Anime News Network, Carlo Santos gave the third volume a C-; while he praised Yuki's illustrations and ability to create "dramatic revelations," he wrote that it was overshadowed by the confusing and cluttered narrative.

Sequential Tart's Sheena McNeil reviewed the series positively, with Yuki's art, characterization, and storytelling a source of praise. She, however, expressed her feelings of annoyance and frustration with the conclusion of the fourth volume, which saw the female characters left behind on purpose by the male members of the orchestra and then Eles' kidnapping by Berthier. She also wrote that Yuki's inclusion of a happy ending felt surprising compared to the rest of the story. Reviewing "Camelot Garden", she enjoyed it less than Grand Guignol Orchestra, and wrote that the short story contained an implicit reference to Lewis Carroll's children's novel Through the Looking Glass (1871) and its character, the ever-sleeping Red King.
