= Boy's Next Door =

Japanese manga

- Boy's Next Door

少年残像 (Shōnen Zanzō)
- Genre: Horror, Psychological, Romance Yaoi
- Manga
- Written by: Kaori Yuki
- Published by: Hakusensha
- Magazine: Hana to Yume
- Published: 1998
- Volumes: 1

Boy's Next Door (少年残像 -Boy's next door-) [sic], also known as Shōnen Zanzō (literally, 'Afterimage of a Boy'), is a one-volume manga by Kaori Yuki. The story, set in Los Angeles, follows the love affair of Adrian, a haunted teacher, and Lawrence, a young male prostitute.

== Characters ==
=== Main characters ===
- Adrian Clay: A 27-year-old elementary school teacher. Adrian was conceived when his mother was raped by a carnie. Neglected and despised by his mother, Adrian led a miserable childhood full of emotional abuse, constantly reminded that he was unwanted. His mother began to sleep with men solely for their money, something Adrian constantly felt was wrong. She attempted to abandon Adrian in a carnival once, and the young boy only managed to wander home after two days. Then, he witnessed one of his mother's "boyfriends" stab her. As she pleaded for him to call the police, promising to take him to the carnival again, Adrian delivered the fatal blow with the knife. She stared at him blankly in death, and, unnerved, he blindfolded her and colored out the eyes of all the portraits. Not wanting other children to have such a childhood, he eventually became a schoolteacher to help troubled children. Despite his mild exterior, however, Adrian hides a dark secret — at night, he is uncontrolled. He picks up young male prostitutes, brutally murders them, and blindfolds them before leaving the scene.
- Lawrence Hill: Nicknamed "Lawr", a fourteen-year-old runaway who was forced into male prostitution by his brother, Dallas. He frequently passes by Adrian's school, and finds Adrian to be a gentle, sad character. He witnessed Adrian's sixth murder, and picked up a name tag Adrian left at the scene. He then uses this to blackmail Adrian into meeting him privately. They then begin to develop a relationship. Lawrence begins to warm up to Adrian, and falls in love with him and just wants him to be happy, and as the relationship progresses, becomes far less robotic and more true to his own desires.

=== Other characters ===
Dallas
Lawrence's older brother. Once a model student, he ran away from home due to the pressure put on him by his school and parents. He then came to be the owner of a male prostitute house, eventually forcing Lawrence to work as one of these prostitutes. Dallas is a violent and dangerous character who brands his prostitutes with tattoos in the figure of a chained iguana. It is common knowledge within the city that anyone who helps one of the prostitutes is eventually "taken care of."

Vicky
One of Adrian's students. A young tomboy foster child, she often gets into scuffles with other students. She lives close by to Adrian and often goes over to his house to feed Wolfy. Adrian sympathizes with her as she feels like an unwanted child, and is often picked on by some of the boys in school. As Adrian attempted to teach tolerance to the boys, she expresses tolerance towards the relationship between Adrian and Lawrence. Wolfy is given to Vicky at the end of the story.

Wolfy
Adrian's pet iguana. Wolfy's pet tag, which Adrian accidentally drops after his first encounter with Lawrence, is kept as blackmail by the boy. Wolfy's eyes are used as a simile; they are described as emotionless and then compared to Lawrence's.

== Release ==
Written and illustrated by Kaori Yuki, Boy's Next Door was published by Hakusensha in Japan on March 19, 1998. Hakusensha re-released the volume in bunkoban format on November 17, 2009. The manga is also licensed for regional language release in German by Carlsen Comics, and in French by Tonkam.
