= Psychic Detective Yakumo =

Japanese mystery novel series and media franchise

心霊探偵 八雲 (Shinrei Tantei Yakumo)
- Novel series
- Written by: Manabu Kaminaga
- Illustrated by: Katoh Akatsuki
- Published by: Nihon Bungeisha
- Original run: 2004 – 2020
- Volumes: 12
- Television drama
- Directed by: Kiyoshi Yamamoto, Koutarou Terauchi
- Original network: TV Tokyo
- Original run: March 3, 2006 – June 26, 2006
- Episodes: 13
- Novel

SECRET FILES Kizuna
- Written by: Manabu Kaminaga
- Illustrated by: Katoh Akatsuki
- Published by: Nihon Bungeisha
- Published: 2007
- Novel series
- Written by: Manabu Kaminaga
- Illustrated by: Yasushi Suzuki
- Published by: Kadokawa Bunko
- Original run: 2008 – present
- Volumes: 5
- Novel

SECRET FILES Kizuna
- Written by: Manabu Kaminaga
- Illustrated by: Yasushi Suzuki
- Published by: Kadokawa Bunko
- Published: 2009
- Manga
- Written by: Manabu Kaminaga
- Illustrated by: Ritsu Miyako
- Magazine: Bessatsu Hana to Yume
- Original run: 2007 – 2008
- Volumes: 2
- Manga
- Written by: Manabu Kaminaga
- Illustrated by: Suzuka Oda
- Magazine: Asuka Magazine
- Original run: 2009 – 2016
- Volumes: 14
- Anime television series
- Directed by: Tomoyuki Kurokawa
- Written by: Hiroyuki Kawasaki
- Music by: R・O・N
- Studio: Bee Train
- Licensed by: NA: Sentai Filmworks
- Original network: NHK-BS2, Anime Network
- Original run: October 3, 2010 – December 26, 2010
- Episodes: 13

Psychic Detective Yakumo (心霊探偵 八雲, Shinrei Tantei Yakumo) is a mystery novel series written by Manabu Kaminaga, published by Nihon Bungeisha with illustrations by Katoh Akatsuki and later published by Kadokawa Bunko with cover illustrations by Yasushi Suzuki. The book has been adapted into two manga series, an anime, a live-action drama series and a stage play. The series ended publication in 2020 with a total of twelve volumes.

== Plot summary ==
Handsome and enigmatic college student Yakumo Saitou was born with a red left eye that allows him to see ghosts and spirits. He uses it with the belief that if he can communicate with them and resolve any issue they may have, then the ghost or spirit can move on to the afterlife. A fellow college student named Haruka Ozawa appears one day, asking him for help to save her friend, who she believes is being possessed by a spirit. He reluctantly accepts and afterwards gets involved in other supernatural related mysteries with her helping him.

== Characters ==
Haruka Ozawa (小沢 晴香, Ozawa Haruka)
Voiced by: Ayumi Fujimura
Played by: Meguru Ishii
Haruka, a beautiful second-year college student who approaches Yakumo asking him to save her friend Miki from spirit possession. After discovering his red eye, she is the first stranger to not be frightened of it nor of his ability to see ghosts. She even comments on how beautiful his eye is, as Yakumo's uncle once predicted. Because of Yakumo, she is able to communicate with her dead twin sister Ayaka who died in an accident when they were seven years old. She was always blaming herself for this, seeing as her sister was chasing a ball she threw onto the road. Later, Yakumo reassures her that it was not her fault and shows her an image of her sister smiling.
Later on they team up and help with cases involving spiritual phenomena. This leads to her forming close bonds with Gotou, Ishii, Makoto and the others. Haruka is extremely caring and is often very sensitive. She never shies away from reaching out to Yakumo, a gesture which later on, as many others noted, ends up changing Yakumo.
Haruka seems to have some feelings toward Yakumo, which develop into some kind of crush. Later on in the novel Haruka comes to terms with her feelings for Yakumo and calls him her "light". She cares for him very deeply and is the first person to face him head on when he succumbs to darkness. She worries about when they would have to part after she graduates.
Yakumo Saito (斉藤 八雲, Saitō Yakumo)
Voiced by: Daisuke Ono
Played by: Shinjiro Atae
Yakumo is the title character, a socially withdrawn and very handsome college student who frequently boards at his school's Filming Club classroom. He was born with heterochromia, with his right eye being black (green in the anime) and his left eye being bright red, which allows him to see ghosts and spirits. He believes ghosts and spirits are bound to earth because of a certain "cause" and simply eliminating that cause will allow those spirits to rest in peace. He meets Haruka Ozawa when she comes to ask for his help in saving her friend being possessed by a spirit.
Yakumo's character is considered blunt, sarcastic, and often comes off as cold or condescending. He also cares little about what others think of him, as he is constantly seen in public wearing baggy clothes and sporting disheveled hair. However, he has a kind heart and will aid whoever comes to ask for it. He is revealed to be ticklish in chapter 27. Due to his remarkably high logic, intellect, and observation skills, he is able to solve mysteries long before the police working on the case do. He often uses tricks and traps to gain what he wants-tricking a teacher, for example, into giving him a passing grade in his class after claiming the teacher was cursed with a supernatural affliction and then 'exorcising' it. Due to people in his childhood being cruel to him thanks to his eye, Yakumo is exceptionally guarded with his feelings and is close to very few people, being Haruka, Gotou, his uncle Isshin, and his younger cousin Nao. He will go to great lengths for these people and risk his life to save them. Many think that Yakumo changed significantly after meeting Haruka and appears to have developed feelings for her.
Kazutoshi Gotou (後藤 和利, Gotō Kazutoshi)
Voiced by: Hiroki Touchi
Gotou is a middle-aged detective who is a bit of a workaholic and has known Yakumo for a long time, always consulting him if there's a paranormal involvement in the case he's investigating. Yakumo often toys with him, asking if his wife has left him, often calling him a bear or telling him that his assistant Ishii is romantically interested in him (which is proven false by Ishii's crush on Haruka). Ten years ago he saved Yakumo from his mother when she attempted to kill him. After Isshin passes away, Goto and his wife, Atsuko, adopt Nao as their daughter. Gotou is bad at expressing feelings until Nao comes into his family. He is extremely protective of the people he loves and would stop at nothing to ensure their safety. He cares about Yakumo greatly and goes to great lengths to protect the latter.
Yuutarou Ishii (石井 雄太郎, Ishii Yūtarou)
Voiced by: Tokuyoshi Kawashima
A detective who works under Detective Gotou and admires him as the "Occult Detective". He used to love supernatural aspects, but after experiencing them firsthand he becomes more frightened of it. Gotou suspected him of being gay for a short period of time, though this turns out to be a false as he's developed a crush on Haruka, often jealous of her relationship with Yakumo. Ishii is initially seen to be very diffident and hesitant often remarking on how he is not fit to be a police officer. Later on he learns to take his own decisions without Gotou and is very intuitive when it comes to solving cases. He is good at looking at the substance and motives of cases rather than mere prima facie evidence and is good at thinking from the perpetrator's perspective. But he is rather naive and trusting which leads him into trouble at places. He is extremely clumsy and often gets easily intimidated. He has a habit of falling down when he tries to walk when panicked.
Makoto Hijikata (土方 真琴, Hijikata Makoto)
Voiced by: Megumi Toyoguchi
Played by: Chinami Ishizaki
A reporter who helps Yakumo and his team during investigations. Her father has a high-standing position in the police force. She was at one point possessed by the ghost of a necrophobic murderer whose desire to live caused him to manifest in her body, but she was later saved by Yakumo. Makoto is a very righteous person. She is also very quick witted and resourceful. She is bold with her words and is very good at her work. While investigating for her work she usually runs into the others and ends up aiding them in collecting information. She has good connections who she can count on to dig up old stories and local information. She often cheers up Ishii when he loses his self confidence. She has feelings for Ishii.
Nao Saito (斉藤 奈緒, Saitō Nao)
Voiced by: Ami Koshimizu
Younger biological paternal half-sister of Yakumo, Nao has been deaf since birth and lives with Isshin Saito in a Buddhist temple. She is unable to hear but is able to sense the feelings of those around her very clearly. After Isshin passes away, Nao is adopted by Gotou and his wife Atsuko.
Nao's biological mother is Akemi Takagishi, who is Yakumo's teacher and had a crush on Isshin. She has a twin brother called Yuuta Takagishi, also Yakumo's half-brother.
Isshin Saito (斉藤 一心, Saitō Isshin)
Voiced by: Toshihiko Seki
He is Yakumo's uncle (biologically, 1 and 1/2 uncle, for he is Azusa's sibling and Unkai's half-sibling) and (adoptive) father (biologically half-uncle) of Nao. He is a father-figure for Yakumo and lives in a Buddhist temple. In order to make Yakumo feel more comfortable about his own eyes, he wears red contacts himself. Isshin was also the one who named Yakumo. At the end of the series, Isshin passes away, and Yakumo consents for his organs to be donated to save the life of a young girl.
Miyuki Nanase (七瀬 美雪, Nanase Miyuki)
Voiced by: Ryoka Yuzuki
Assistant in evil to Yakumo's biological father. Miyuki is shown as being physically strong, mentally twisted, and very loyal to Yakumo's father. Miyuki is a product of adultery of her de jure paternal grandfather and her mother and has been abused by her "father" (half-uncle). With the guidance of Yakumo's father, she killed the three and escapes. She is jealous of Yakumo for his father's attention to him. One of her aliases is Yukiko Hoshino. Miyuki is often shown to be extremely cunning and sadistic. She derives pleasure from emotionally torturing others. She is usually very calm, haughty and quick thinking until something does not go the way she planned which leads her to react very violently. She has a very twisted personality and acts very obsessive towards Yakumo's father. She is very smart and often crafts intricate traps for Yakumo.

== Anime adaptation ==
An anime adaptation produced by Bee Train, written by Hiroyuki Kawasaki, and directed by Tomoyuki Kurokawa began airing in Japan on October 3, 2010. Minako Shiba designed the characters and Daisuke Ono and Ayumi Fujimura were cast as the lead roles, with the opening theme songs also performed by Ono. The songs, "Key", "Key Phase 2", and "Key Phase 3", and ending song "Missing You" by Lisa Komine were released on November 17, 2010. The series has been licensed for digital and home video release by Sentai Filmworks.

== See also ==
- Lafcadio Hearn, aka Yakumo Koizumi
- Usotoki Rhetoric – a manga series illustrated by Ritsu Miyako
- Pretty Boy Detective Club – a novel series whose manga adaptation was illustrated by Suzuka Oda
- Disney Twisted-Wonderland – a mobile game whose second manga adaptation was written and illustrated by Suzuka Oda
