= Ludwig Kakumei =

Japanese manga series

- Ludwig Revolution
- The cover of the first volume of Ludwig Kakumei, as published by Hakusensha (2004), depicting the titular protagonist and Blanche

ルードヴィッヒ革命 (Rūdovihhi Kakumei)
- Manga
- Written by: Kaori Yuki
- Published by: Hakusensha
- Magazine: Melody; Hana to Yume Step; Hana to Yume; Bessatsu Hana to Yume
- Original run: January 1999 – September 2007
- Volumes: 4
- Manga

Ludwig Fantasy
- Written by: Kaori Yuki
- Published by: Hakusensha
- Magazine: Bessatsu Hana to Yume
- Original run: February 2012 – September 2013
- Volumes: 1

Ludwig Kakumei (ルードヴィッヒ革命, Rūdovihhi Kakumei; "Ludwig Revolution") is a Japanese manga series by Kaori Yuki. It debuted in the January 1999 issue of the shōjo (targeted towards girls) manga magazine Melody, before being transferred to Hana to Yume Step, Hana to Yume, and finally Bessatsu Hana to Yume, where it concluded in the September 2007 issue. The sixteen chapters were compiled into four tankōbon by Hakusensha, and were published from June 2004 to December 2007. The series follows Ludwig, a self-centered, flamboyant prince, as he travels with his loyal, soft-hearted valet in search of a bride.

== Plot ==
Ordered by his father to find a bride, Prince Ludwig (Lui), a flamboyant former collector of female corpses, travels the land with his loyal and soft-hearted servant Wilhelm.

== Characters ==
=== Main characters ===
- Prince Ludwig: The hero (or, more accurately, anti-hero) of the manga who is known for his womanizing ways and his selfish actions. Ludwig is surprisingly intelligent, and solves the mysteries of some of the princesses. In the first chapter he is depicted as a necrophiliac and keeps a room full of female corpses in glass coffins, but by the second story he's given up on dead women and starts looking for a live bride. He has a fondness for well-endowed beauties, and chooses his potential brides judging mostly by their bust size. He bears an uncanny resemblance to his mother, queen Amalberga. Friederike was the first woman for whom he actually had feelings without noticing her breast size. After Friederike died, he always thought about her and got to see her again in the end. He is named after Jakob Ludwig Grimm. He is a mere 19 years old, and stands at 186 cm tall. He is sometimes mistaken as a female, and is nicknamed Lui.
- Wilhelm: Lui's attendant. He is kind-hearted and easy to deceive. He is always being abused because of the prince's way of life. He and Lisette are childhood friends. It can be said that his patience and meekness keeps him with his master. He fills the role of the most prominent comic relief of the manga. As a child, Wilhelm wanted to be a knight but was too gentle. Ludwig took advantage of his kind heart and make Wilhelm a servant, partly to prevent others from ordering him around. He was named after Wilhelm Karl Grimm. Lisette loves him.
- Lisette: She is presented as a young girl in the beginning of the story, who is set up by Prince Ludwig and then deceived in believing that her parents sold her. She slaughters them with an axe, gaining the nickname "Red Riding Hood" after the massacre due to her blood-soaked mantle. After disappearing for a long time (during which she claimed she was sold as a prostitute), she reappears as a grown-up, mercenary killer on the hunt for Ludwig, bearing extreme hatred towards him. She is also obsessed with money, even taking gold from the City of the Dead. It is also suggested that she may have feelings for Wilhelm (in which she pulls him close to her) because she wanted him as a reward after Lui hired her. She was Wilhelm's childhood friend who treated Wilhelm kindly because she liked him.
- Dorothea: An eccentric witch with masochistic tendencies and possibly the bustiest character in the manga (she boasts a 65G cup, as Ludwig says). She is responsible for cursing princess Friederike and initially appears as some sort of villain, but then becomes attached to Ludwig and becomes his (unwanted) maid. As a witch she wields some impressive magical powers, which saved Ludwig's life at the cost of her own. Only in the end it is revealed that she lived for several centuries, reincarnating every time her current corporeal vessel died out. This loop is broken when Ludwig comes to her aid and sets her free, leaving her with one last life to live.
- Friederike: A princess blessed by twelve witches but cursed by a thirteenth (this one being Dorothea, the only "true" witch among the thirteen, the other twelve were ornamental, all mistresses of the king). She grew up believing that a crayfish blessed her mother and left her pregnant with her. During her 15th birthday, she follows her father to a tower where she discovers where he hides his mistresses. One jealous mistress tells Friederike that she was the result of a brutal rape and all her talents and looks were not her own by nature. This made Friederike lose faith in her parents; not completely believing the words of the mistress, she enters the tower and pricks herself on spindle (drugged with a powerful narcotic) making a deal with herself: should she fall asleep, then all the mistress's words where true. With this, she plunges into a century-long sleep. When Ludwig encounters her via the possession of a pocketwatch buried in a field where Ludwig passes by, she is still locked in her dream state. After Ludwig pursues Dorothea the witch who "cursed" Friederike and uncovered the drug used on the spindle, it becomes clear that the briar castle curse only became a reality because Friederike's mother was a witch and passed her magical blood to her daughter. Ludwig confirms Friederike's abilities and looks as her own and her birth. His words break Friederike's guard and he enters the castle at last and awakes her. However, as no one can actually sleep for 100 years, after she awakes she dies. Friederike always worries about Lui, even agreeing to help Dorothea to save him. She is the only princess that Lui truly loves.
- Julius: Prince Julius appears out of nowhere as the King's stepson, and thus Ludwig's stepbrother. This is, however, a mere hoax plotted by his "mother" Petronella, a witch craving for the title of queen. Mistaking Amalberga for Ludwig, he bears an extreme hatred towards him for most of the series, but it is actually revealed that he fell madly in love with him some times prior to the beginning of the story. Wielder of some potent witchcraft, he is allowed to stay under Ludwig's protection in the end.
- Hansel and Gretel: Abused children who were abandoned and forced to wander and live miserably, to the point of almost dying of starvation, until they were taken in by a murderous and sadistic woman. The experience left the two, brother and sister, extremely deranged and cruel, and turned them into brutal assassins. They were hired by Julius to kill Ludwig when Lisette failed the same duty twice, and were apparently killed during one of these attempts. They were saved however, and were allowed to live with Julius in the care of Ludwig. For their assassinations, the two are by no means stealthy: Hansel wields an enormous and eerie-looking axe, while Gretel uses an oddly-shaped flamethrower.

=== Minor characters ===
- Amalberga: Ludwig's mother and the queen of her kingdom, she appears near the end of the manga. A warlike and fierce woman, the first time is seen she wears what appears to be a Schutzstaffel uniform and wields a bazooka. It is not mere cosmetics, for the queen is exceptionally feared due to her ferocity and explosive temper, especially by her husband. She bears an extreme physical resemblance to her son, so much in fact that Julius mistook her for Ludwig when she was, actually, the murderer of his sister. Her nickname is the Massacre Queen.
- Ludwig's Father: The King, mostly a comic relief due to his arguments with his son Ludwig and his fear of his wife, queen Almaberga.
- Petronella: A powerful witch that posed as Julius' mother and made herself known as a mistress of the King in his court. She actually took in Julius when he was exiled from the kingdom and taught him the arts of witchcraft, hoping to use him as a way to become queen herself. It is quite ironic that she never knew that the true queen never actually died or vanished, but was just waging war in nearby countries.

== Development ==
Ludwig Kakumei is a parody of fairy tales. Kaori Yuki conceived the idea for the manga after considering the traditional role of princes within fairy tales: she remarked that in the majority of fairy tales, "the princes do nothing, they are not very interesting, and that was exactly something that I wanted to revolutionize." The fairy tales alluded to throughout the series include the versions of "Snow White" and "Rapunzel", as collected by the Grimm Brothers, and Charles Perrault's "Bluebeard" and "Cinderella". Yuki also altered some aspects of the fairy tales. Yuki's Snow White, for example, is revealed in a plot twist to be wicked, because Yuki could not reconcile how a kind-hearted maiden could order her stepmother to dance herself to death.

== Media ==
=== Manga ===
Written and illustrated by Kaori Yuki, the series debuted in the January 1999 issue of the manga magazine Melody. Subsequent chapters appeared occasionally in Hana to Yume Step and Hana to Yume, and the series later transferred to the monthly Bessatsu Hana to Yume in the September 2006 issue and concluded in the September 2007 issue. Hakusensha collected the chapters in four bound volumes and published them from June 18, 2004, to December 18, 2007. Ludwig Revolution has been translated into other languages, including Chinese by Culturecom Comics, German by Carlsen Comics, and French by Editions Tonkam.

A sequel, ルードヴィッヒ幻想曲 (Ludwig Gensōkyoku), began with a stand-alone chapter in the February 2012 issue of Bessatsu Hana to Yume, and continued with a mini-series, which appeared in the same manga magazine from the July 2013 issue to the September 2013 issue. Hakusensha collected the chapters into a bound volume and published on 18 October 2013. The sequel has been translated by Editions Tonkam into French as Ludwig Fantasy.

=== Volume list ===
No.	Japanese release date	Japanese ISBN
01	June 18, 2004	978-4-592-17095-2
Chapter 1: "Snow White"; Chapter 2: "Little Red Riding Hood"; Chapter 3: "Sleeping Beauty"; Chapter 4: "Bluebeard"
02	January 19, 2007	978-4-592-18409-6
Chapter 5: "Rapunzel"; Chapter 6: "Maid Maleen"; Chapter 7: "The Frog King, or Iron Heinrich"; Chapter 8: "The Goose Girl"
03	June 19, 2007	978-4-592-18410-2
Chapter 9: "Hansel and Gretel"; Chapter 10: "Cinderella" Part 1; Chapter 11: "Cinderella" Part 2; Chapter 12: "Cinderella" Part 3
04	December 18, 2007	978-4-592-18411-9
Chapter 13: "The Salt Princess" Part 1; Chapter 14: "The Salt Princess" Part 2; Chapter 15: "The Salt Princess" Part 3; Chapter 16: "The Blue Light"

=== Drama CD ===
On November 22, 2006, Geneon Entertainment released a drama CD of the series. It featured Tomokazu Sugita as Ludwig, Wataru Hatano as Wilhelm, Miyuki Sawashiro as Friederike, Yumi Kakazu as Dorethea, and Akiko Yajima as Blanche.
