= Beauty and the Beast of Paradise Lost =

Japanese manga series

- First tankōbon volume cover

落園の美女と野獣 (Rakuen no Bijo to Yajū)
- Genre: Dark fantasy; Romance
- Manga
- Written by: Kaori Yuki
- Published by: Kodansha; Pixiv
- English publisher: NA: Kodansha USA
- Magazine: Palcy
- Original run: October 17, 2019 – November 25, 2021
- Volumes: 5
- icon

Beauty and the Beast of Paradise Lost (Japanese: 落園の美女と野獣, Hepburn: Rakuen no Bijo to Yajū) is a Japanese manga series written and illustrated by Kaori Yuki. It was serialized in Kodansha and Pixiv's manga app Palcy from October 2019 to November 2021.

== Publication ==
Written and illustrated by Kaori Yuki, Beauty and the Beast of Paradise Lost was serialized in Kodansha and Pixiv's manga app Palcy from October 17, 2019, to November 25, 2021. Kodansha collected its chapters in five tankōbon volumes, released from February 13, 2020, to March 11, 2022.

The series was licensed for English release in North America by Kodansha USA.

=== Volumes ===
No.	Original release date	Original ISBN	English release date	English ISBN
1	February 13, 2020	978-4-06-518423-3	August 17, 2021	978-1-64651-250-8
2	June 11, 2020	978-4-06-519749-3	November 23, 2021	978-1-64651-293-5
3	October 13, 2020	978-4-06-520984-4	December 21, 2021	978-1-64651-294-2
4	September 13, 2021	978-4-06-524790-7	March 15, 2022	978-1-64-651399-4
5	March 11, 2022	978-4-06-526781-3	December 27, 2022	978-1-64-651400-7
