= Usotoki Rhetoric =

Japanese manga series

- First tankōbon volume cover

嘘解きレトリック
- Genre: Historical mystery
- Manga
- Written by: Ritsu Miyako
- Published by: Hakusensha
- English publisher: NA: One Peace Books
- Magazine: Bessatsu Hana to Yume
- Original run: October 26, 2012 – March 26, 2018
- Volumes: 10
- Television drama
- Directed by: Hiroshi Nishitani; Kozo Nagayama; Masayuki Suzuki
- Written by: Shiori Takeshi; Kokeshi Okame; Sachiko Oguchi
- Music by: Yugo Kanno; Akihiro Manabe
- Studio: Fuji TV; AOI Pro.
- Original network: Fuji TV
- Original run: October 7, 2024 – December 16, 2024
- Episodes: 11

Usotoki Rhetoric (嘘解きレトリック) is a Japanese manga series written and illustrated by Ritsu Miyako. It was serialized in Hakusensha's Bessatsu Hana to Yume manga magazine from October 2012 to March 2018. A live-action television drama adaptation aired on Fuji TV from October to December 2024.

== Characters ==
Kanoko Urabe (浦部 鹿乃子, Urabe Kanoko)
Portrayed by: Honoka Matsumoto
Kanoko has the ability to hear people's lies, which caused her to face scrutiny growing up. She is Iwai Soma's detective assistant.
Iwai Soma (祝 左右馬, Soma Iwai)
Portrayed by: Ouji Suzuka
Iwai is a poor detective who is good at deduction and bluffing. He works together with Kanoko, figuring out the reasoning behind the people Kanoko hears lying.

== Media ==
=== Manga ===
The series was written and illustrated by Ritsu Miyako. It was serialized in Hakusensha's Bessatsu Hana to Yume manga magazine from October 26, 2012, to March 26, 2018.

In March 2022, One Peace Books announced their license to the manga in English and would begin releasing the series in September 2022.

==== Volume list ====
| No. | Original release date | Original ISBN | English release date | English ISBN |
|---|---|---|---|---|
| 1 | June 20, 2013 | 978-4-59-219633-4 | October 13, 2022 | 978-1-64273-203-0 |
| 2 | November 20, 2013 | 978-4-59-219634-1 | February 14, 2023 | 978-1-64273-241-2 |
| 3 | May 20, 2014 | 978-4-59-219635-8 | June 13, 2023 | 978-1-64273-242-9 |
| 4 | January 20, 2015 | 978-4-59-219636-5 | September 26, 2023 | 978-1-64273-296-2 |
| 5 | September 18, 2015 | 978-4-59-219637-2 | January 23, 2024 | 978-1642733013 |
| 6 | February 19, 2016 | 978-4-59-219638-9 | March 12, 2024 | 978-1642733433 |
| 7 | December 20, 2016 | 978-4-59-219639-6 | May 28, 2024 | 978-1642733440 |
| 8 | May 19, 2017 | 978-4-59-221468-7 | August 13, 2024 | 978-1642733952 |
| 9 | December 20, 2017 | 978-4-59-221469-4 | October 15, 2024 | 978-1-64273-396-9 |
| 10 | August 20, 2018 | 978-4-59-221490-8 | February 4, 2025 | 978-1642734560 |

=== Drama ===
A live-action television drama adaptation produced by Fuji TV was announced on August 26, 2024. It was directed by Hiroshi Nishitani, Kozo Nagayama, and Masayuki Suzuki, written by Shiori Takeshi, Kokeshi Okame, and Sachiko Oguchi, and starring Honoka Matsumoto and Ouji Suzuka. The drama aired from October 7 to December 16, 2024.

== Reception ==
The School Library Journal listed the first volume of Usotoki Rhetoric as one of the top 10 manga of 2022.

Rebecca Silverman from Anime News Network rated the first volume a B, praising the historical setting, while stating that the mysteries were "decent without being mind-blowing".

== See also ==
- Psychic Detective Yakumo, a novel series whose first manga adaptation was illustrated by Ritsu Miyako
