= Tomohiko Kira =

Tomohiko Kira 吉良 知彦
- Born: December 6, 1959 Yamanashi Prefecture
- Died: July 3, 2016 (aged 56)
- Instruments: Fender Stratocaster '78, Larrivee C-50, Button Bouzuki (flat back) and others
- Formerly of: Zabadak

Tomohiko Kira (吉良 知彦) (December 6, 1959 – July 3, 2016) was a Japanese guitarist who led the band ZABADAK. He also composed the original music for the 1988 cult horror film Evil Dead Trap, and performed guitar on soundtracks of the role-playing video games Xenogears (1998) and Chrono Cross (1999), playing the opening and ending themes on the latter. He later recorded an album with the singer of the ending theme from Chrono Cross, Noriko Mitose. He also composed the opening theme for the TV anime Spice and Wolf (2008) and provided backing vocals in the chorus.

His hobbies included collecting insects and the outdoors. He owned a collection of butterflies and beetles.

He died on July 3, 2016, 3 months after playing at a 30th anniversary concert.
