= Angel Sanctuary =

Manga series by Kaori Yuki

- Cover of the first volume of the English-language translation by Viz Media (2004), depicting Sara and Setsuna

天使禁猟区 (Tenshi Kinryōku)
- Genre: Dark fantasy; Supernatural
- Manga
- Written by: Kaori Yuki
- Published by: Hakusensha
- English publisher: NA: Viz Media
- Magazine: Hana to Yume
- Original run: July 20, 1994 – November 5, 2000
- Volumes: 20
- Original video animation
- Directed by: Kiyoko Sayama
- Produced by: Satoshi Kubo; Yoshiyuki Itō; Katsunori Haruta
- Music by: Hikaru Nanase
- Studio: Hal Film Maker
- Licensed by: NA: Central Park Media (former); Media Blasters
- Released: 25 May 2000 – 25 August 2000
- Runtime: 30 minutes (each)
- Episodes: 3
- Manga

Angel Sanctuary: Tokyo Chronos
- Written by: Kaori Yuki
- Published by: Hakusensha
- Magazine: Hana to Yume Ai
- Original run: 20 April 2022 – 20 August 2025
- Volumes: 5

Angel Sanctuary (Japanese: 天使禁猟区, Hepburn: Tenshi Kinryōku) is a Japanese manga series written and illustrated by Kaori Yuki. It was serialized in the shōjo manga magazine Hana to Yume from July 1994 to November 2000. It follows Setsuna Mudo, a human teenager who, as the reincarnation of a prominent angel who rebelled against Heaven, becomes entangled in political machinations between the angels and demons. The 120 chapters were collected and published in twenty bound volumes by Hakusensha from February 1995 to February 2001. Titled Coming of the Seraphim in the early stages of its development, Angel Sanctuary was inspired by the Japanese fantasy novel Nocturne and was originally slated to be only ten chapters long, which led Yuki to worry about being able to properly end the story. Angel Sanctuary made cultural references to various mythologies, including Greek and Norse, as well as to real-world people, music, literature, and places.

Viz Media published an English-language translation in North America from February 2004 to June 2007. Angel Sanctuary was also adapted into a series of drama CDs, published from December 1999 to September 2001, and a three-episode original video animation (OVA) by Bandai Visual and Hal Film Maker published in 2000; Yuki assisted on various aspects of both adaptations. Angel Sanctuary was critically and commercially well received by English-language readers and critics, with Yuki's art and narrative highlighted as its strengths. The OVA received more mixed reviews from critics, who were generally divided on whether they enjoyed it as an introduction to the events of the manga or found its content objectionable due to the sibling incest.

== Plot ==
Beginning in Japan in 1999, Angel Sanctuary focuses on Setsuna Mudo, a 16-year-old troubled high-school student in love with his 15-year-old sister Sara. While struggling with his incestuous feelings, he learns that he is the reincarnation of Organic Angel Alexiel, who led a rebellion against her fellow angels after witnessing their slaughter of the Evils, a group of demons, after God's disappearance. At the conclusion of the revolt, she sealed away her younger twin brother, Inorganic Angel Rosiel, within the Earth, emotionally unable to fulfill his request to be killed before he became insane and destructive. Captured and branded a fallen angel, Alexiel was punished by having her body frozen and her soul endlessly reincarnated as a human whose life is full of misery.

While Rosiel is freed by his subordinate Katan, Setsuna finds his life and Sara's endangered by various attempts to awaken Alexiel's dormant soul within him. Realizing they cannot bear to be separated, Setsuna and Sara run away together and consummate their love, hoping to start a new life together. Sara eventually dies protecting him from one of Rosiel's subordinates, and devastated, Setsuna awakens Alexiel's soul, causing widespread damage. Adam Kadamon, the angel closest to God, intervenes by turning back time to just after Alexiel's awakening and freezing time on Earth; she then tasks him with freeing her from her imprisonment. To search for Sara's soul, sent to Hell for incest, Setsuna's body enters a near-death state. While in Hell, his soul searches for hers, eventually learning that it has been taken to Heaven instead. Sara, meanwhile, awakens in the body of Jibriel, the archangel of water held prisoner by the angels; revealed to be Jibriel's reincarnation, Sara is eventually returned to her original body but finds herself impregnated by the malicious angel Sandolphon, who hopes that she will bear him a body. After Rosiel absorbs Sandolphon to gain his power, an act which speeds up Rosiel's physical and mental decay, Sandolphon's remnants possess her, causing her to see Setsuna as a monster.

Assisted by Lucifer, the ruler of the demons who is in love with Alexiel, Rosiel unseals the Tower of Etenamenki, where God rests, with Alexiel's body. Intent on restoring the Earth, Setsuna follows him, with Kurai and the archangels of fire and earth; along the way, he aids an injured Katan, who hopes to save Rosiel before he loses his free will to do so. At the tower, Rosiel kills Katan, only to realize that he had killed the one he loved and tried to protect from himself; he then goes into a state of destructive despair. Awakening in her own body with Setsuna's help, Alexiel reveals to him that she had always loved him: because he had been born the opposite of his healthy sister, she bargained with God to save his life in exchange for her imprisonment, from which she later escaped with Lucifer, and an agreement to never show him any compassion. She then kills him and absorbs him into her womb so that they will never be apart again. Before dying, Rosiel passes along his power to Setsuna.

Setsuna and his group find Adam Kadamon's head, used to nourish the unborn angels, and learn that she attempted to prevent God's plan of destroying humanity by hiding him and the tower from the angels and freezing time in hopes that Alexiel's reincarnation could save them. Because God draws power through Adam Kadamon, the archangels and Kurai seal her up, while Setsuna confronts God and encounters Sara and Lucifer there. Sara overcomes her possession to cast out Sandolphon, and Setsuna defeats God with Lucifer's help. Time returns to normal on Earth, where Setsuna and Sara joyfully reunite at last.

== Development ==
According to manga artist Kaori Yuki, the concept for Angel Sanctuary has been with her "for the longest time". As a middle-school student in her second year, Yuki found the story of fallen angels, particularly Lucifer, fascinating; in Angel Sanctuary, she offered her own interpretation of fictional angels, which differed from her thoughts on actual angels. Yuki was inspired to write about angels and demons in Tokyo after reading the Japanese fantasy novel Nocturne; the book centered around a demonic prince and princess who search for another demon on earth, who has possessed an idol singer, and try to destroy it. While the original title for the manga was Coming of the Seraphim, Yuki later decided against it in favor of Angel Sanctuary, as she thought that "angel" should be included in the title and "sanctuary" had a sense of something "forbidden" or "against God". Sara, originally named Sana, was the first character designed, while the first episode of the manga imagined was one in which the protagonist's love interest "was actually a living angel". She decided to set Angel Sanctuary in Japan in "near future", partially because the setting would be largely unchanged and partially because she had a wish to draw modern clothing styles and sailor uniforms.

As she had been already working on a successful serial, the gothic mystery manga Earl Cain, she faced difficulty in convincing others to let her begin another serial. Initially, she was allowed only ten installments of Angel Sanctuary, which led her to worry about being able to properly end the story. At that time, she had the character development up to Zaphikel's death scene and fragments of the plot; she found it difficult to construct a narrative to join the scenes she wanted to draw. The original character designs underwent changes, and only Kato's remained unchanged. Several angels were planned to make an appearance, but never did; among them were the Angel of the Yoke and the leader of the angels, Sakaki. For the conclusion, she originally had planned to use a tragic ending, but decided against it in favor of a happy one, because she thought that it would be too upsetting for the fans to read after twenty volumes.

A promotional image of the Angel Sanctuary OVA: clockwise from the center are Setsuna, Alexiel, and Rosiel. An abundance of color was included in the adaptation to prevent it from appearing "dull".

When Angel Sanctuary was adapted into an audio drama series, Yuki participated in selecting voice actors; around two to three auditioned for each role. Ten, however, auditioned for the role of Setsuna, with Kenji Nojima ultimately chosen. Ayako Kawasumi provided the voice of Sara, while Takehito Koyasu and Yuuko Miyamura voiced Sakuya Kira and Kurai, respectively. For Arachne, Yuki envisioned a "transvestite" voice actor, which proved to be unfeasible. The antagonists Katan and Rosiel were voiced by Shin-ichiro Miki and Nozomu Sasaki, respectively. Yuki attended several sessions, during which she directed the voice actors and helped them with their interpretations of the characters.

Yuki assisted on Angel Sanctuary's adaptation into an original video animation (OVA). She helped with the color direction in the first episode; although she prefers the color combinations of white, red, and black, the production staff was interested in including an abundance of color in the anime adaptation to prevent it from seeming "dull". She also produced character designs with detailed descriptions of various elements, such as eye shape and earrings. Editing the already finished script was the most difficult aspect of the adaptation for her, as time and space constraints resulted in the elimination of some scenes and she felt that sometimes a character's personality would be changed. She insisted on the inclusion of certain narrative points, which made it tricky to reach a compromise with the production staff at times. Regardless, she expressed her satisfaction with the finished product.

=== Cultural references and influences ===
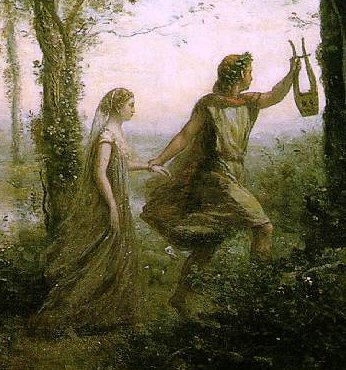
Orpheus's journey to the underworld to bring back Eurydice (pictured) is one of the references to Greek mythology in the series.

In Angel Sanctuary, Yuki incorporated references to several mythologies and religions. Greek mythology features prominently, with allusions to the Orpheus' descent to the underworld, the mythical location Hades, Pandora's box, and Prometheus. Additionally, the transgender demon Arachne takes her name from the weaver Arachne. References to Norse mythology also appear, with allusions to Yggdrasil and the dragon Nidhogg. Other mythologies alluded to include Jewish and Christian mythology; Yuki used quotes from the Bible periodically in the series.

Additionally, Yuki included references to real-life people, literature, locations, and music. The Tower of Etenamenki is an allusion to the ziggurat Etemenanki in Babylon. The character Katan shares his name with Katan Amano, a dollmaker. Kira's name is a reference to Japanese music group Zabadak's Tomohiko Kira, while the minor character Kirie takes her name from a Mr. Mister song. Moonlil, another minor character, was based on Japanese idol singer Hirosue. The Goth subculture in Tokyo, Japan, and rock bands with androgynous musicians influenced the clothing of the angels and demons in the series. References to literature appeared in the series, such as Lewis Carroll's children's novel Alice's Adventures in Wonderland and the Brothers Grimm fairy tale "Rapunzel".

== Themes ==
Yuki identified "forbidden love" as the theme of Angel Sanctuary. Jason Thompson wrote that Angel Sanctuary's portrayal of incest adhered to the "classical tormented sense" which results in unfavorable consequences for the involved characters, including "guilt, madness, and the punishment of heaven". One reviewer for Manga News remarked that, while Angel Sanctuary's premise is centered on the romantic relationship between the protagonists, the series includes more ambiguous portrayals of love, with dedication blending into submission and hatred into passion; love, according to the reviewer, is sometimes synonymous with "hatred, treachery, and suffering", rather than "happiness and tenderness".

Other themes and social issues have been discussed. Active Anime's Holly Ellingwood wrote that the universe of Angel Sanctuary concerned itself with the concepts of good and evil, unconditional love, human nature, and the interpersonal struggle for "love, acceptance, and ... survival". The reviewer for Manga News wrote that the portrayal of angels and demons in the series challenged the binary of good and evil, with both sides given positive and negative traits; the Evils are additionally shown to be the victims of both the angels and human-caused environmental pollution. In an interview, Yuki drew attention to the tension between science and nature in the series. She wondered if it was possible for the natural world to coexist with science, despite continual, considerable environmental damage as a result of human innovations, and reflected that in the titles of Rosiel and Alexiel, the Inorganic and Organic Angels.

== Media ==
=== Manga ===
The chapters of Angel Sanctuary appeared twice a month as a serial in the manga magazine Hana to Yume from the 5 July 1994 issue to the 20 October 2000 issue. Hakusensha collected and published the 120 chapters in twenty bound volumes from 17 February 1995, to 19 February 2001. Hakusensha later re-released the series in ten volumes from 14 June 2002, to 13 June 2003.

Angel Sanctuary is licensed by Viz Media for an English-language release in North America. Viz Media published the series from 25 February 2004 to 12 June 2007. A digital edition was also published in 2013. Angel Sanctuary has been translated into a variety of languages, among them Chinese, German, Italian, Polish, Hungarian, French, Russian, and Spanish.

A sequel manga written by Yuki, titled Angel Sanctuary: Tokyo Chronos, was serialized in Hakusensha's Hana Yume Ai web magazine from 20 April 2022 to 20 August 2025. The sequel is set to end with the release of its fifth volume in January 2026.

=== Audio drama ===
A total of fifteen audio drama CDs, divided into six arcs, were released for Angel Sanctuary. The first arc, Assiah, was published by Bandai Music Entertainment in four parts between 16 December 1998 to 21 March 1999. It featured music by Kuroyurishimai, and a soundtrack was released on 21 April 1999. Prhythm later re-released the Assiah arc from 17 March to 21 April 2004, with the soundtrack published on the same day as the final CD.

The remainder of the audio drama was published by Lantis. Hades comprised three parts and was published from 3 August to 25 October 2000, while the remaining four arcs were released in two parts: Gehenna was published on 21 December 2000 and 24 January 2001, followed by Yetzirah on 21 March and 25 April 2001, and Beri'ah on 27 June and 25 July 2001. The final arc, Atziluth, was published on 29 August and 29 September 2001.

=== OVA ===
Directed by Kiyoko Sayama and produced by Bandai Visual, Lantis, and Hal Film Maker, the Angel Sanctuary OVA consisted of three episodes: "Encounter", "Awakening", and "Regeneration". Satoshi Kubo, Yoshiyuki Itoh, and Katsunori Haruta served as producers, while Junichiro Nishikawa was the art director. Shuichi Shimamura worked as supervising director and was in charge of character design. Hikaru Nanase composed the OVA's music, with Hideyuki Tanaka as sound director. The opening theme song was "MESSIAH", while the ending theme song, "Knife of romance", was performed by Phi. Bandai published the episodes individually from 25 May to 25 August 2000.

An English-language translation was licensed in North America by Central Park Media, which published it on 10 July 2001 and re-released it on 24 May 2005. Media Blasters acquired the license for the OVA in 2007, and later re-released it with new cover art.

=== Art books ===
Hakusensha published two Angel Sanctuary art books: the first, The Art of Angel Sanctuary: Angel Cage, (Note: 由貴香織里画集 天使禁猟区 ANGEL CAGE, Yuki Kaori Gashū Tenshi Kinryō Ku Angel Cage) was released on 25 July 1997, and the second, The Art of Angel Sanctuary 2: Lost Angel, (Note: 由貴香織里画集 天使禁猟区II 失墜天使 Lost Angel, Yuki Kaori Gashū Tenshi Kinryō Ku II Shittsui Tenshi Lost Angel) followed on 27 September 2000. Viz Media released English-language translations of both in North America on 6 September 2005 and 30 October 2007.

== Reception ==
Angel Sanctuary was nominated for the Grand Prize of the 1st Sense of Gender Award in 2001. The manga series has been well received by English-language readers, with fifteen volumes appearing in ICv2's monthly lists of the 100 best-selling graphic novels. The French translation also became a bestseller.

Angel Sanctuary received generally favorable reviews from critics. One reviewer for Manga News lauded it as one of the classics of shōjo manga and the most popular of Yuki's works. Jason Thompson described it in Manga: The Complete Guide as "The archetypical 1990s goth manga". Yuki's artwork received praise as detailed, "breath-taking", "absorbing", and "beautiful", though one reviewer found the art "overcrowded" and had difficulty distinguishing between the male and female characters. While writing that the artwork could have been improved in some instances, most notably in regards to some placements of the characters' eyes, could have used better placement, Rika Takahashi of Ex magazine remarked that the overall quality ranked among some of the best in the horror or occult genre. Critics generally enjoyed the plot as "dense", intriguing, suspenseful, complex, and quickly paced. Liann Cooper of Anime News Network commented that the story of Angel Sanctuary was well written, despite the inclusion of shock factors, with enough plot twists to hold the attention of the reader while staying focused on the main narrative. Thompson wrote that the plot was difficult to follow because of the page layouts, the large cast of androgynous characters, and the dense world building. Another reviewer found the plot "confusing" at times and thought that the series's topics of gender issues and incest might discourage some readers. The tie-in artbook received similarly positive reviews for Yuki's artwork.

The OVA, in contrast, generally received more mixed reviews. Some enjoyed it as a prologue or introduction to the events of the manga, while others were put off by the sibling incest. Critics generally enjoyed the animation, although one reviewer disagreed, writing that the anime disregarded the "delicate" character designs of the manga in favor of artwork that was "nothing special". The English-language dub, however, was generally not favorably regarded, and one reviewer noted technical issues with its audio syncing.
