= Zabadak (band) =

Japanese musical group

Zabadak (ザバダック, Zabadakku) is a Japanese musical group formed by Tomohiko Kira, Yoko Ueno, and Katushi Matsuda in 1985. The sound of Zabadak has been strongly influenced by both Celtic music and progressive. In 1993, Ueno and Matsuda left and Kira continued the group as a solo act still under the name Zabadak. Kira's partner and longtime support member Koko Komine joined in March 2011. Kira died on July 3, 2016, from an undisclosed cause at the age of 56.

Zabadak was named after a song by Dave Dee, Dozy, Beaky, Mick & Tich. The main-belt asteroid 10566 Zabadak was named after the band.

Zabadak albums include collaborations and co-writes with American songwriter Cara Jones.

== Discography ==
=== Albums ===
==== Studio albums ====
1. ZABADAK-I
  - Released March 20, 1986, by Toshiba-EMI
2. Gin no Sankaku (銀の三角)
  - Released February 4, 1987, by Toshiba-EMI
3. WATER GARDEN
  - Released August 26, 1987, by Toshiba-EMI
4. Welcome to Zabadak (ウェルカム・トゥ・ザバダック)
  - Released November 5, 1987, by Toshiba-EMI
5. Sora Tobu Yume (飛行夢)
  - Released November 1, 1989, by MMG
6. Tooi Ongaku (遠い音楽)
  - Released October 25, 1990, by MMG
7. ZABADAK
  - Released February 14, 1991, by Toshiba EMI
8. Watashi wa Hitsuji (私は羊)
  - Released October 25, 1991, by MMG
9. Juunigatsu no Gogo, Kawara de Boku wa Natsu no Fuukei o Omoidashiteita. (十二月の午後、河原で僕は夏の風景を思い出していた。)
  - Released July 13, 1992, by Biosphere Records
10. Sakura (桜)
  - Released January 25, 1993, by MMG
11. Oto (音)
  - Released October 25, 1994
12. SOMETHING IN THE AIR
  - Released September 11, 1996, by Polystar
13. Hikari Furu Asa (光降る朝)
  - Released October 14, 1996, by Polystar
14. TRiO
  - Released August 25, 1997, by Polystar
15. LiFE
  - Released September 18, 1997, by Polystar
16. Hachimitsu Hakusho (はちみつ白書)
  - Released September 2, 1998, by Polystar
17. iKON ~Tooi Tabi no Nikki~ (iKON ～遠い旅の記憶～)
  - Released January 20, 2000, by Biosphere Records
18. Kaze o Tsugu Mono (風を継ぐ者)
  - Released April 8, 2001, by Nevula Project
19. COLORS
  - Released November 1, 2001, by Gargoyle
20. Blizzard Music (ブリザード・ミュージック)
  - Released November 24, 2001, by Nevula Project
21. SIGNAL
  - Released November 7, 2002, by Gargoyle
22. Wonderful Life
  - Released January 22, 2004, by Gargoyle
23. Sora no Iro (空ノ色)
  - Released November 11, 2004, by Gargoyle
24. Kaiten Gekijou (回転劇場)
  - Released March 14, 2007, by Gargoyle
25. Heikou Sekai (平行世界)
  - Released February 15, 2009, by Gargoyle
26. Kakenukeru Kaze no you ni -Original Soundtrack for "Kaze o Tsugi Mono" 2009- (駆け抜ける風のように -Original Soundtrack for『風を継ぐ者』2009-)
  - Released August 4, 2009, by Nevula Project
27. Hito (ひと)
  - Released March 14, 2011, by Gargoyle
28. Inochi no Kioku (いのちの記憶)
  - Released April 8, 2013, by Gargoyle
29. Лето јесен зима пролеће - 夏 秋 冬 春 -
  - Released June 15, 2013, by Gargoyle

==== Compilation albums ====
1. Souseiki ~The Best of Zabadak~ (創世紀 ～ザ・ベスト・オブ・ザバダック～)
  - Released June 24, 1992, by Toshiba-EMI
2. decade
  - Released September 25, 1993, by MMG
3. remains
  - Released August 25, 1996, by Biosphere Records
4. Pieces of The Moon
  - Released October 35, 1996, by MMG
5. Souseiki +2 (創世紀 +2)
  - Released December 11, 1996, by Toshiba-EMI
6. STORIES
  - Released September 15, 1999, by Polystar
7. Christmas Songs (クリスマスソングス)
  - Released December 8, 2004, by Gargoyle
8. 20th
  - Released July 19, 2006, by Polystar
  - Re-released January 20, 2010, by Universal Music
9. CARAMELBOX SOUNDBOOK [GREEN]
  - Released July 11, 2009, by Nevula Project

==== Rearrange albums ====
1. Saito NEKO quartet plays ZABADAK with KIRA tomohiko
  - Released October 1, 2000, by Biosphere Records
2. Uchuu no Radio (宇宙のラジヲ)
  - Released September 19, 2007, by Gargoyle

==== Live albums ====
1. Live (ライブ)
  - Released April 25, 1991, by MMG
2. prunus
  - Released August 20, 1994, by Biosphere Records
3. wonderful live 2004.3.5 @ club citta'& signal live 2003.1.11 @ nakano zero
  - Released August 2004 by Gargoyle

=== Singles ===
1. "Bi Chance -Ayashii Ronde-" (美チャンス－妖しい輪舞－)
  - Released September 25, 1987, by Toshiba-EMI
2. "Mizu no Runesu / Seraphita" (水のルネス／シェラフィータ)
  - Released October 5, 1987, by Toshiba-EMI
3. "FOLLOW YOUR DREAMS"
  - Released March 10, 1989, by MMG
4. "LET THERE BE LIGHT"
  - Released June 25, 1989, by MMG
5. "harvest rain (Houjou no Ame)" (harvest rain （豊穣の雨）)
  - Released June 25, 1990, by MMG
6. "Tooi Ongaku" (遠い音楽)
  - Released September 25, 1990, by MMG
7. "Shiiba no Harubushi" (椎葉の春節)
  - Released January 25, 1993, by MMG
8. "MERRY GO ROUND Mitai na Kimi" (MERRY GO ROUNDみたいな君)
  - Released September 2, 1998, by Polystar
9. "Kaachibai" (夏至南風(カーチバイ))
  - Released October 28, 2000, by penelope

=== Videos ===
1. live
  - Released April 25, 1991, by MMG (VHS/LD)
2. noren wake
  - Released December 5, 1993, by Biosphere Records (VHS)
  - Re-released February 14, 2005 (DVD)
3. noren wake ...plus
  - Released May 5, 1994, by Biosphere Records (LD)
4. "OTO" LIVE 12.28, 1994 at ON AIR WEST TOKYO
  - Released December 25, 1995, by Zabadak Office(VHS)
  - Re-released February 14, 2005 (DVD)
5. Zabadak 10566
  - Released November 12, 2000, by Biosphere Records (VHS)
  - Re-released February 14, 2005 (DVD)
6. CARAMELBOX PRESENTS ZABADAK ACOUSTIC LIVE
  - Released July 14, 2002, by Gargoyle (VHS)
7. Still I'm fine
  - Released January 11, 2003, by Gargoyle (VHS)
8. biosphere years 1988-2000 zabadak special DVD box
  - Released June 30, 2003, by Biosphere Records
  - Contains:
    - noren wake
    - "OTO" LIVE 12.28, 1994 at ON AIR WEST TOKYO
    - Zabadak 10566
    - 1986-1993 SPECIAL EDITION
    - "trio" at ON AIR EAST 1997.6.1
9. 1986-1993 SPECIAL EDITION
  - Released February 14, 2005, by Biosphere Records (DVD)
10. "trio" at ON AIR EAST 1997.6.1
  - Released February 14, 2005, by Biosphere Records (DVD)
11. ZABADAK 2006~2007@CLUB CITTA'
  - Released September 20, 2007, by Gargoyle (DVD)
12. ZABADAK a Paris
  - Released July 19, 2008, by Gargoyle (DVD)
13. ZABADAK Shinshun Gekkouyakai (ZABADAK 新春月光夜會)
  - Released June 24, 2010, by Gargoyle (DVD)
