= Kaori Yuki =

Japanese manga artist

- Born: December 18; Tokyo, Japan
- Occupation: Manga artist
- Years active: 1987–present
- Known for: Angel Sanctuary; Earl Cain
- Website: http://www.yukikaori.jp/

Kaori Yuki (由貴 香織里, Yuki Kaori; born December 18 in Tokyo, Japan) is a Japanese manga artist best known for her gothic manga such as Earl Cain, its sequel Godchild, and Angel Sanctuary. Yuki debuted professionally in 1987 with "Ellie in Summer Clothes" (夏服のエリー, Natsufuku no Erii), which ran in the manga anthology Bessatsu Hana to Yume published by Hakusensha, after placing in one of the many contests held by Hana to Yume. Her work is typically serialized in one of Hakusensha's two shōjo manga anthologies, Bessatsu Hana to Yume and Hana to Yume. In 2010, Kaori Yuki was one of many manga artists whose work would appear in the new shōjo manga anthology Aria by the publisher Kodansha on July 28, 2010.

== Personal life ==
Kaori Yuki is a pen name; originally she had chosen "Eri Minase" but then decided on "Kao Yuki," derived from the actress Yuki Saito, with the addition of a "Ri" character for the pen name "Kaori Yuki."

== Bibliography ==
=== Manga ===
- Ellie in the Summer Clothes (夏服のエリー, Natsufuku no Erī) (1987)
- When a Heart Beats (1987)
- Devil Inside (1988)
- Earl Cain series (伯爵カインシリーズ, Hakushaku Kain Shirīzu)
  - Forgotten Juliet (忘れられたジュリエット, Wasurerareta Jurietto)
    (1992, Hana to Yume Comics, Hakusensha, ISBN 4-592-12597-5; English translation, 2006)
  - The Sound of a Boy Hatching (少年の孵化する音, Shōnen no Fukasuru Oto)
    (1993, Hana to Yume Comics, Hakusensha, ISBN 4-592-12642-4; English translation, 2006)
  - Kafka (カフカ, Kafuka)
    (1994, Hana to Yume Comics, Hakusensha, ISBN 4-592-12659-9; English translation, 2007)
  - The Seal of the Red Ram (赤い羊の刻印, Akai Hitsuji no Kokuin)
    (1994, Hana to Yume Comics, Hakusensha, 2 volumes (vol.1: ISBN 4-592-12234-8, vol.2: ISBN 4-592-12235-6); English translation, 2007)
- Screw (螺子, Neji)
  (1992–1993, 2001, Hana to Yume Comics, Hakusensha, ISBN 4-592-17784-3)
- Gravel Kingdom (砂礫王国, Sareki Oukoku)
  (1993, Hana to Yume Comics, Hakusensha, ISBN 4-592-12624-6)
- Cruel Fairytales (残酷な童話たち, Zankoku na Douwa-tachi)
  (1993, Hana to Yume Comics, Hakusensha, ISBN 4-592-12612-2)
- Angel Sanctuary (天使禁猟区, Tenshi Kinryōku)
  (1994–2000, Hana to Yume Comics, Hakusensha, 20 volumes; English translation, 2004)
- Kaine (1996)
- Boy's Next Door (少年残像, Shōnen Zanzō)
  (1997, Hana to Yume Comics, Hakusensha, ISBN 4-592-12497-9)
- Godchild (ゴッド チャイルド, Goddo Chairudo)
  (2001–2003, Hana to Yume Comics, Hakusensha, 8 volumes; English translation, 2005)
- Blood Hound (夜型愛人専門店−ブラッドハウンド-DX, Yorugata Aijin Senmonten - Buraddohaundo Derakkusu)
  (2003–2004, Hana to Yume Comics, Hakusensha, ISBN 4-592-18881-0)
- Parfum Extrait 0 (0の奏香師, Zero no Sōkōshi)
  (2004–2005, Hana to Yume Comics, Hakusensha, ISBN 4-592-18764-4; English translation)
- Ludwig Revolution (ルードヴィッヒ革命, Rūdovihhi Kakumei)
  (2004–2007, Hana to Yume Comics, Hakusensha, 4 volumes)
- Fairy Cube (妖精標本, Yōsei Hyōhon)
  (2005–2006, Hana to Yume Comics, Hakusensha, 3 volumes; English translation, 2008)
  - Psycho Knocker (2004, one-shot in Fairy Cube #3)
- Camelot Garden (キャメロット・ガーデン, Kyamerotto Gāden)
  (2008, Bessatsu Hana to Yume, Hakusensha, one-shot)
- Grand Guignol Orchestra (人形（ギニョール - Ginyōru）宮廷楽団, Guignol Kyūtei Gakudan)
  (2008–2010, Hana to Yume Comics, Hakusensha, 5 volumes; English translation, 2010)
- Demon From Afar (異域之鬼, IIki no Ki)
  (2010–2013, Aria, Kodansha, 6 volumes; English translation, 2014)
- Alice in Murderland (架刑のアリス, Kakei no Arisu)
  (January 2014–September 2018, Aria, Kodansha, 11 volumes; English translation, 2015)
- Beauty and the Beast of Paradise Lost (落園の美女と野獣, Rakuen no bijo to yajū)
  (2019–2021, Palcy, Kodansha, 5 volumes; English translation, 2021)
- Angel Sanctuary - Tokyo Chronos (天使禁猟区－東京クロノス－, Tenshi Kinryōku－Tokyo kuronosu)
  (2022..., Hana Yume Ai, Hakusensha, ongoing)

=== Art books ===
- The Art of Angel Sanctuary: Angel Cage, 1997, Hakusensha, ISBN 4-592-73144-1; English translation, 2005
- The Art of Angel Sanctuary II: Lost Angel, 2000, Hakusensha, ISBN 4-592-73174-3; English translation, 2007

=== Postcard books ===
- Card Gallery, 1995, Hakusensha, ISBN 978-4-592-72032-4 (4-592-72032-6)
- Angel Sanctuary Postcard Book: Angelic Voice, 1999, Hakusensha, ISBN 4-592-73159-X

== Video game character design ==
- Meine Liebe (マイネリーベ, My Love) (2001)
