= Bessatsu Hana to Yume =

Japanese manga magazine

- Cover of the August 2009 issue, featuring Chihiro (left) and Ritsu (right) from Nanpei Yamada's Orange Chocolate
- Categories: Shōjo manga
- Frequency: Monthly
- Circulation: 32,233; (October – December 2017)
- First issue: July 1977
- Final issue: May 2018
- Company: Hakusensha
- Country: Japan
- Based in: Tokyo
- Language: Japanese
- Website: betsuhana.com

Bessatsu Hana to Yume (Japanese: 別冊花とゆめ), also known as BetsuHana (別花), was a Japanese shōjo manga magazine published by Hakusensha from 1977 to 2018. It was a sister magazine to Hana to Yume. A continuation titled Hana to Yume Ai a shoujo webzine spin-off of Hana to Yume with talented creators began monthly release in Japan the same year.

== History ==
Bessatsu Hana to Yume was launched in July 1977 as a sister magazine to Hana to Yume. After 41 years, it ceased publication with the release of its July 2018 issue on May 26, 2018.

The publishing schedule for Bessatsu Hana to Yume changed regularly since its inception:

Years	Publishing schedule
1977–1991:	Quarterly
1991–1993:	Bimonthly
1993–2001:	Monthly
2002–2006:	Bimonthly
2006–2018:	Monthly

== Serializations ==
The following is a partial list of titles serialized in the magazine:

- Ai no Moto ni Tsudoe by Miku Sakamoto
- Blank Slate by Aya Kanno
- Blood Hound by Kaori Yuki
- Boku wo Tsutsumu Tsuki no Hikari by Saki Hiwatari
- Boku wa Chikyū to Utau by Saki Hiwatari
- Camelot Garden (one-shot) by Kaori Yuki
- Glass Mask by Suzue Miuchi
- Grand Guignol Orchestra by Kaori Yuki
- Gunjō Cinema by Ritsu Miyako
- King of Cards by Makoto Tateno
- Ludwig Kakumei by Kaori Yuki
- Ludwig Gensōkyoku: Kaguya-hime by Kaori Yuki
- Orange Chocolate by Nanpei Yamada
- Otomen by Aya Kanno
- Patalliro! by Mineo Maya
- Rasetsu by Chika Shiomi
- Sakura no Hana to Kōcha Ōji by Nanpei Yamada
- Skyblue Shore by Nanpei Yamada
- Shinrei Tantei Yakumo: Akai Hitomi wa Shitteiru by Manabu Kaminaga (story), Ritsu Miyako (art)
- Shitsuji-sama no Okiniiri by Fuyu Tsuyama (story), Rei Izawa (art)
- Tōran Merry Rose by Ritsu Miyako
- Touring Express Euro by Masumi Kawasou
- The Vampire & His Pleasant Companions by Marimo Ragawa
- Usotoki Rhetoric by Ritsu Miyako
- Yukarism by Chika Shiomi

== Related magazines ==
- Hana to Yume
- LaLa
- LaLa DX
- Melody
- The Hana to Yume
