= List of Fushigi Yûgi chapters =

Viz's second edition release of Fushigi Yûgi (right) uses a very different cover from the original Japanese release (left), replacing the pastel framed image with new artwork.

The chapters of the manga series Fushigi Yûgi were written and illustrated by Yuu Watase. The first chapter premiered in the January 1, 1992 (No. 1) issue of Shōjo Comic, released in December 1991. The series concluded in the June 5, 1996 (No. 12) issue, released in May 1996. Fushigi Yûgi tells the story of two teenage girls, Miaka and Yui, who are pulled into The Universe of the Four Gods, a mysterious book they find at the National Diet Library. In the book world, they are each priestesses of separate beast gods, with jealousy and tragedy turning the best friends against one another. A prequel series, Fushigi Yûgi: Genbu Kaiden, appeared in Shōjo Comic Zōkan in 2003 before moving to an offshoot magazine called Perfect World Fushigi Yûgi in 2004. When Perfect World folded in 2008, the manga was placed on hiatus for two years, resuming serialization in Rinka in 2010. It moved once again to Zōkan Flowers in 2012, ending in 2013. Genbu Kaiden details the creation of The Universe of the Four Gods and tells the full story of the Priestess of Genbu, who is only briefly mentioned in the original series. Following Genbu Kaiden, a one-shot chapter, Fushigi Yûgi: Byakko Ibun, was published in Monthly Flowers in February 2015. It served as an introduction to another prequel series, Fushigi Yûgi: Byakko Senki, which began serialization in Monthly Flowers in August 2017, but was placed on hiatus in August 2018 due to Watase's health issues. Byakko Senki will be the final installment in the "Four Gods" storyline.

The 106 individual chapters of Fushigi Yûgi were collected and published in eighteen tankōbon volumes by Shogakukan starting in May 1992; the last volume was released in July 1996. Shogakukan collected the chapters of Fushigi Yûgi: Genbu Kaiden into twelve tankōbon volumes published from October 2003 to May 2013, and the chapters of Fushigi Yûgi: Byakko Senki into seven tankōbon volumes as of October 2026.

Fushigi Yûgi and its prequel series, Fushigi Yûgi: Genbu Kaiden and Fushigi Yûgi: Byakko Senki, are all licensed for English-language releases in North America by Viz Media. Viz serialized Fushigi Yûgi in their manga anthology magazine, Animerica Extra, starting with the October 1998 debut issue and running until the magazine's final issue in December 2004. The series was first released in a flipped trade paperback format, starting in August 1998. Viz kept the original Chinese names of characters and places, at the request of Watase, causing some confusion for fans as the anime version uses the Japanese names. After eight volumes, Viz put the release on hiatus, later reviving it in June 2003 with a re-release of the series in unflipped standard manga size volumes and printing volumes nine through eighteen. The final volume was released in April 2006. In the table below, the dates and ISBN numbers given for the first eight volumes are for the second edition releases. In January 2009, Viz again began re-releasing the series, this time as part of their "VIZBIG" line of manga, which include three of the original volumes into a single, larger volume with extra color pages. The first volume of Genbu Kaiden was released in English in July 2005; the twelfth and final volume was released in March 2014. Viz released the first volume of Byakko Senki in August 2020.

== Volume list ==
=== Fushigi Yûgi ===
No.	Title	Original release date	North America release date
1	Priestess	May 26, 1992; 4-09134-351-1	November 1, 2003; 1-56931-957-X
001: "The Young Lady of Legends"; 002: "The Boy With the Demon Star"; 003: "The Priestess of Suzaku"; 004: "The Seven Constellations of Suzaku"; 005: "Dangerous Love"; 006: "Hidden Love"
2	Oracle	August 21, 1992; 4-09134-352-X	April 1, 2004; 1-56931-958-8
007: "The Aimless Heart"; 008: "A Dark Invitation"; 009: "Awakening Memories"; 010: "Come Back Home"; 011: "Longing For You"; 012: "Reaching Out"
3	Disciple	November 26, 1992; 4-09134-353-8	June 1, 2004; 1-56931-992-8
013: "The Invisible Enemy"; 014: "Let Me Protect You"; 015: "Captive Women"; 016: "The Priestess of Seiryu"; 017: "Souls Drifting Apart"; 018: "Only You"
4	Bandit	January 26, 1993; 4-09134-354-6	October 19, 2004; 1-56931-993-6
019: "Wo Ai Ni"; 020: "Wolf of the Fortress"; 021: "Illusion's Embrace"; 022: "City of Resurrection"; 023: "In the Darkness"; 024: "A Battle of Anguish"
5	Rival	April 26, 1993; 4-09134-355-4	January 4, 2005; 1-59116-097-9
025: "The Music of Meeting"; 026: "Remote Reunion"; 027: "Love Trap"; 028: "A Prelude to Love"; 029: "A Heart Torn Asunder"; 030: "A Duel without Mercy"
6	Summoner	July 26, 1993; 4-09134-356-2	April 12, 2005; 1-59116-098-7
031: "The Way to Goodbye"; 032: "To Protect You"; 033: "Never Leave You"; 034: "The Final Embrace"; 035: "The Treacherous Tune"; 036: "The Decisive Flame"
7	Castaway	October 26, 1993; 4-09134-357-0	July 5, 2005; 1-59116-139-8
037: "Forbidden Love"; 038: "The Night of the Star-gazing Festival"; 039: "Frail Smile"; 040: "Vow on a Grave"; 041: "The Mystery of 'The Universe of the Four Gods'"; 042: "Reminiscence of the Future"
8	Friend	January 26, 1994; 4-09134-358-9	October 11, 2005; 1-59116-087-1
043: "The Sealed Castle Wall"; 044: "The Spark of Combat"; 045: "Heartland"; 046: "Maelstrom of Fear"; 047: "Watching You Always"; 048: "Sorrow in the Snow"
9	Lover	April 26, 1994; 4-09134-359-7	October 29, 2003; 1-59116-096-0
049: "Valley of Tears"; 050: "Ice Guardians"; 051: "A Hazardous Bargain"; 052: "Mirage of Hell"; 053: "Defiled Love"; 054: "The Depths of Love"
10	Enemy	July 26, 1994; 4-09134-360-0	March 17, 2004; 1-59116-138-X
055: "Illusionary Warmth"; 056: "Dawn for the Heart"; 057: "Ominous Eyes"; 058: "Counterfeit Memory"; 059: "Counterfeit Love"
11	Veteran	October 26, 1994; 4-09136-221-4	June 30, 2004; 1-59116-107-X
060: "Ray of Resurrection"; 061: "A Sad Fate"; 062: "The Unbreakable Wall"; 063: "The Truth Revealed"; 064: "Imminent Parting"; 065: "Tragic Battle"
12	Girlfriend	January 26, 1995; 4-09136-222-2	October 5, 2004; 1-59116-201-7
066: "Embracing Evil"; 067: "Matrimony"; 068: "The Dividing Light"; 069: "Real/Unreal Boy"; 070: "Surge of the Heart"; 071: "To Live For You"
13	Goddess	April 26, 1995; 4-09136-223-0	January 4, 2005; 1-59116-086-3
072: "Requiem to the Sky"; 073: "The Ceremony"; 074: "Even if It Takes My Life"; 075: "Bye-bye"; 076: "Miracle Wings"; 077: "A New Story"
14	Prophet	July 26, 1995; 4-09136-224-9	April 12, 2005; 1-59116-737-X
078: "The Call to Begin"; 079: "The Open Door"; 080: "The Lost Heart"; 081: "Seven Destinations"; 082: "The Quickening of Evil"
15	Guardian	October 26, 1995; 4-09136-225-7	July 5, 2005; 1-59116-843-0
083: "The Gathering Gloom"; 084: "The Young Sorcerer"; 085: "The Silent Child"; 086: "Laughter from the Darkness"; 087: "A Feast for Puppets"; 088: "Sentimental Tears"
16	Assassin	January 26, 1996; 4-09136-226-5	October 11, 2005; 1-4215-0023-X
089: "The Crushed Passage"; 090: "Miiru"; 091: "The Mystic Fang"; 092: "The Broken Plan"; 093: "The Gulf of Courage"; 094: "A Dream Drawn for You"
17	Demon	April 25, 1996; 4-09136-227-3	January 10, 2006; 1-4215-0180-5
095: "Captain of Ruin"; 096: "Overflowing Doubt"; 097: "The Night Wandering"; 098: "Blaze of Camaraderie"; 099: "The Tragic Transmigration"; 100: "The Ephemeral Reflection in the Water"
18	Bride	July 26, 1996; 4-09136-228-1	April 11, 2006; 1-4215-0393-X
"101: Tamahome's Shadow"; "102: Souls Seeking Their Mates"; "103: The Eternal Vow"; "104: The Red Wave of Love"; "105: The Final Battle"; "Final chapter: Everlasting Wo Ai Ni"

=== Fushigi Yûgi: Genbu Kaiden ===
No.	Original release date	Original ISBN	North America release date	North America ISBN
1	October 25, 2003	4-09138-471-4	July 5, 2005	1-59116-896-1
01: "The Beginning of the Myth"; 02: "Wind-Slasher Demon Rimudo"; 03: "Fateful Resolution"
2	May 26, 2004	4-09138-472-2	November 1, 2005	1-59116-911-9
04: "The Maiden of Silver Light"; 05: "The Star of the Barrier"; 06: "The Song of the Gondola"
3	November 26, 2004	4-09138-473-0	March 7, 2006	1-4215-0288-7
07: "The Legendary Origin Stone"; 08: "Tears of the Stone Wall"
4	May 26, 2005	4-09138-474-9	July 5, 2006	1-4215-0579-7
09: "Kissed by the Wind"; 10: "By Your Side"; 11: "Frozen Land of Lamentation"; 12: "Oblivion Resolved"
5	November 25, 2005	4-09138-475-7	November 7, 2006	1-4215-0580-0
13: "Awakened Love"; 14: "The Festival of Love"; 15: "The Destination of the Stars"; 16: "Chaos in the Red Light District"
6	March 26, 2007	4-09130-869-4	February 5, 2008	1-4215-1926-7
17: "Flame of Sorrowful Tears"; 18: "Longing to Live"; 19: "The Eighth Star"
7	September 26, 2007	4-09131-196-2	November 4, 2008	1-4215-2256-X
20: "The Land of Betrayal"; 21: "Wailing Valley"; 22: "Two Howls"; 23: "Everlasting Emotion"
8	March 26, 2008	4-09131-557-7	April 7, 2009	1-4215-2595-X
24: "Return to the Stars"; 25: "Meeting in the Hidden Forest"; 26: "Unavoidable Truth"; 27: "The Distant Separation"
9	September 26, 2008	4-09131-849-5	November 3, 2009	978-1-4215-3035-2
28: "A Foreign Embrace"; 29: "I Hear You Call"; 30: "To Where You Are"; 31: "Many Descending Thoughts"
10	June 24, 2011	978-4-09-133808-2	September 4, 2012	978-1-4215-4259-1
32: "City in the Dark"; 33: "Labyrinth of Humans Sea"; 34: "The Prince of Sorrowful Winds"
11	June 26, 2012	978-4-09-134476-2	March 5, 2013	978-1-4215-5244-6
35: "The Chain of Resentment"; 36: "The Prophecy's Conclusion"; 37: "Eternal Bond"
12	May 17, 2013	978-4-09-135347-4	March 4, 2014	978-1-4215-6434-0
38: "Heaven's Roar"; 39: "Those Who Were Summoned"; Final: "A Hundred Years of Love"

=== Fushigi Yûgi: Byakko Senki ===
No.	Original release date	Original ISBN	North America release date	North America ISBN
1	April 10, 2018	978-4-09-870117-9	August 4, 2020	978-1-9747-1164-2
01: "The Day Everything Changed"; 02: "The Star in the Sand"; 03: "The Coming of the False Priestess"; 04: "Dubious Recollections"
2	August 9, 2024	978-4-09-872675-2	July 1, 2025	978-1-9747-5568-4
05: "The Girl Who Travels Between Worlds"; 06: "The Ripples of Reunion"; 07: "The Discovery"
3	December 10, 2024	978-4-09-872814-5	December 2, 2025	978-1-9747-5798-5
08: "The Signs of a New Beginning"; 09: "The Worry-Filled Journey"; 10: "The Crow People"
4	April 10, 2025	978-4-09-873062-9	June 9, 2026	978-1-9747-6296-5
11: "True Priestess & False Priestess"; 12: "Remembrance Everlasting"; 13: "The Proof of Protection"
5	October 9, 2025	978-4-09-873125-1; 978-4-09-943218-8 (SE)	October 6, 2026	978-1-9747-6664-2
14: "The Hidden Path of Splendor"; 15: "The Ceremony of the Eternal Flame"; 16: "Maiden in Motion"
6	June 10, 2026	978-4-09-873417-7	—	—
17: "Flowers of the Inner Chambers"; 18: "Conspiracy in the Air"; 19: "An Uneasy Scent"
7	October 8, 2026	978-4-09-873579-2	—	—
20: "Dancer in the Moonlight"; 21: "Assembly in Black"; 22: "Breath’s Ease"
