= Tonkam =

French publishing company

- Industry: Comics
- Founded: 1994
- Founder: Sylvie Chang, Dominique Véret
- Headquarters: France
- Website: Editions-Tonkam.com

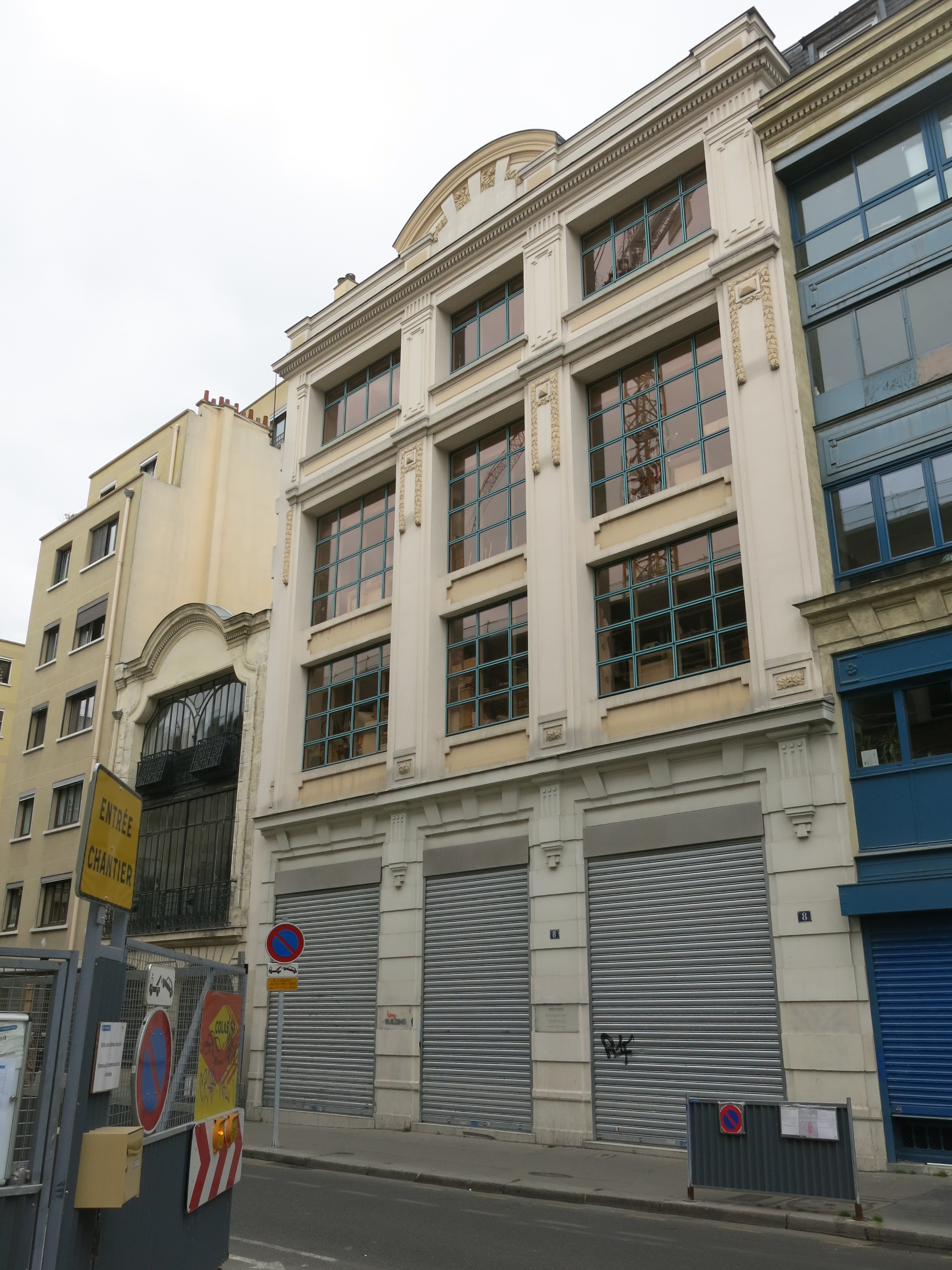
Tonkam head office

Tonkam is a French publisher and one of the first publishers of manga in French, issuing its first titles in 1994. It was founded by Sylvie Chang and Dominique Véret with the financial assistance of a Parisian bookseller, Yu-Chi Chang. The company had some legal problems when it published New Angel; because of its hentai content was forced to retire the product from the market. In 1996, Tonkam entered into a venture with the Belgian publisher Ypnos to publish Korean manhwa, but the experience was short-lived as Ypnos closed soon after.

Dominique Véret, left his post of publishing director in the early years 2000 to found the publishing company Akata, in partnership with Delcourt.

At the end of 2005, after the death of Yu-Chi Chang, Mmes Françoise and Sylvie Chang, owners of the company, signed a contract with Delcourt which became the major actionist of the company, but the two companies kept different editorial strategies and identities. However, Tonkam could enjoy the structures and editorial presence of Delcourt, so during January 2006, Tonkam dropped its in-house distribution system, and its distribution is currently assured by Hachette.

Guy Delcourt is the current CEO.

== Titles published ==
Titles published by Delcourt/Tonkam include the following:

- Adolf
- Angel/Dust
- Angel Sanctuary
- Appare Jipangu!
- Asatte Dance
- Ayashi no Ceres
- Black & White
- Black Magic
- Blue Spring
- Bokko
- Boku wo Tsutsumu Tsuki no Hikari
- Buddha
- Butsu Zone
- Cat's Eye - Rights moved to Panini Manga in 2004
- Count Cain
- Crazy Kouzu BC
- Cross Game
- Descendants of Darkness
- DNA²
- Dominion
- Dragon Quest: The Adventure of Dai
- Duck Prince
- Fairy Cube
- Fake
- Family Compo - Rights moved to Panini Manga in 2004
- Fever, la rencontre ultime
- Flame of Recca
- Frères du Japon (Nihon no Kyodai)
- Fushigi Yūgi
- Fushigi Yūgi Genbu Kaiden
- Gakuen Heaven
- Gakuen Tengoku
- Gankyu Kitan Yui
- Gantz
- Godchild
- Guuzen ga Nokosu Mono
- Gyo
- H2
- Hana-Kimi
- Hellsing
- Hellstar Remina
- Hidamari no Ki
- High School! Kimengumi
- Hikaru no Go
- Hiyoko Brand - Okusama wa Joshi Kousei
- Homunculus
- Hyper Rune
- I¨s
- I'll
- Ichi the Killer
- Ichigo 100%
- Imadoki!
- Jesus
- Jin
- Joan
- JoJo's Bizarre Adventure
- Jinbē
- Kare Kano
- Kimagure Orange Road
- Kindaichi Case Files
- Kizuna: Bonds of Love
- Komorebi no Moto de - Rights moved to Panini Manga in 2004
- Koucha Ouji
- Lady Georgie
- Lawful Drug
- Love & Destroy
- Ludwig Revolution
- M
- Magical Taruruto
- Maison Ikkoku
- Miyuki-chan in Wonderland
- MW
- Phoenix
- Please Save My Earth
- Pretty Face
- Rash!! - Rights moved to Panini Manga in 2004
- RG Veda
- Rookies
- Sakura no Hanasaki Kukoro - Rights moved to Panini Manga in 2004
- Secret Chaser
- Seimaden
- Screw
- Shadow Lady
- Shiba Inu
- Short Program
- Shounentachi no ita Natsu - Rights moved to Panini Manga in 2004
- Shumari
- Special A
- Spirit of the sun
- Tenshi no okurimono - Rights moved to Panini Manga in 2004
- The Executive's Dog
- The Crater
- The One I Love
- The Tragedy of P
- The World Reads Japan's Modern Literature
- Tigre et Dragon
- Tokyo Babylon
- Tomie
- Tough
- Trigun
- Trigun Maximum
- Uzumaki
- Vagabond
- Video Girl Ai
- Wish
- X
- Yamada Taro Monogatari
- Zetman
- Zetsuai 1989
