= Sakura-Gari =

Japanese manga series by Yuu Watase

- Cover of the first volume of the series, featuring Masataka Tagami

櫻狩り
- Genre: Boys' love, drama, suspense
- Manga
- Written by: Yuu Watase
- Published by: Shogakukan
- Imprint: Flower Comics Special (original); Flowers Comics (re-release)
- Magazine: Rinka
- Original run: June 14, 2007 – January 14, 2010
- Volumes: 3

Sakura-Gari (Japanese: 櫻狩り; lit. "Cherry Blossom Hunting") is a Japanese manga series written and illustrated by Yuu Watase. As the author's first boys' love (BL) series, it follows the relationship between a poor student and his aristocratic benefactor, who hides a dark secret. Sakura-Gari was serialized in Rinka, a spin-off of Shogakukan's josei manga magazine Monthly Flowers, from June 2007 to January 2010. Shogakukan collected its chapters in three tankōbon volumes published from 2008 to 2010. The company issued a new edition of the manga in 2016.

== Synopsis ==
Set in Japan in 1920, the story follows the relationship between Masataka Tagami, a poor student who wishes to enter Tokyo Imperial University, and Sōma Saiki, a tormented aristocrat with a sulfurous reputation. Sōma agrees to employ Masataka as a servant and house him while he prepares for the university's entrance exam. As Masataka grows closer to the beautiful Sōma, he uncovers dark and disturbing secrets about the Saiki family.

== Characters ==
Masataka Tagami (田神 正崇, Tagami Masataka)
An honest and prodigious 17-year-old student aiming to enter Tokyo Imperial University. He attends prep school as a rōnin and becomes a pupil of the Saiki family, who sponsor his education in exchange for his work as a servant. He previously lived with his kind-hearted adoptive parents, the owners of a small bookshop, who cared for him after his mother abandoned him as a child. Masataka later confesses to Sōma that he is a child born of rape, and that is why his traumatized mother abandoned him.
Sōma Saiki (斎木 蒼磨, Saiki Sōma)
The son and heir of Lord Saiki, a distinguished noble, and Abigail, an impoverished English woman. He is called "the Western doll" because of his pretty face and detached manner. He is also bisexual and, despite the possibility of being engaged to marry a girl named Kanako, he takes lovers of both sexes among the servants. Sōma had a troubled childhood: his mother died in childbirth, his English grandmother neglected him, and multiple people sexually abused him after he joined the Saiki family in Japan.
Sakurako Saiki (斎木 櫻子, Saiki Sakurako) / Yōya (櫻弥)
A beautiful 15-year-old girl with white hair and red eyes. She is the half-sister of Sōma, and the daughter of Lord Saiki and his legal wife, who was locked away for years in the household's warehouse after her misbehavior became too much to handle. Later, it is revealed that Sakurako is actually a young man named Yōya, posing as a woman and using his mother Sakurako's name as his own, having been mentally and emotionally shattered by his mother's death (which he blames Sōma for). He both loves and hates Sōma due to their shared past, and tortures all of Sōma's lovers among the servants out of jealousy.
Katō (加藤)
The head servant of the Saiki household, and Sakurako's personal caretaker.
Tomohiko Katsuragi (葛城 知彦, Katsuragi Tomohiko)
The doctor of the Saiki household, and Sōma's long-time lover. He also worked as a servant when he was young. He and Sōma share a secret related to the death of someone who abused Sōma as a child.
Masayo (昌代)
Tomohiko's wife, whom he physically abuses.
Nobuhito Terashima (寺島 伸人, Terashima Nobuhito)
A young servant in the mansion, and one of Sōma's lovers. He is a talented artist. While he gets along well with Masataka, he is also jealous of the boy since he realizes that Sōma likes him.
Ohatsu (お初)
The head cook of the Saiki household who is very kind to Masataka. She knows many family secrets.
Hiroshi Yoshino (吉野 寛, Yoshino Hiroshi)
An employee of the Saiki family's trading company. In the past, he worked as a servant in the household and is implied to have been one of Sōma's lovers.
Kanako (華奈子)
A rich girl whom Sōma may be engaged to.
Takafumi Matsushita (松下 孝文, Matsushita Takafumi)
Masataka's biological older brother, and the only member of his biological family who is still in contact with him. He dies in police custody.
Mitsugu Tagami (田神 貢, Tagami Mitsugu)
Masataka's "younger brother" in the Tagami household, who cares for him as his own brother. His health is poor and he and believes himself to be a burden on Masataka, whose approval he desperately craves.

== Publication ==
Sakura-Gari was written and illustrated by Yuu Watase. It premiered in the inaugural issue of Rinka, a spin-off of Shogakukan's josei manga magazine Monthly Flowers, released on June 14, 2007. It concluded in Rinka's ninth issue, released on January 14, 2010. Sakura-Gari is notable for being Watase's first boys' love (BL) manga series. Shogakukan collected its chapters in three tankōbon volumes published under the Flower Comics Special imprint from 2008 to 2010. They re-released the series in three shinsōban volumes published under the Flowers Comics imprint in 2016. Internationally, Sakura-Gari has been licensed in Spanish by ECC Ediciones, French by Tonkam, and German by Egmont Manga & Anime. In response to fan inquiries, North American publisher SuBLime (an imprint of Viz Media) said they could not "risk publishing" the series in English as it contains underage rape.

No.	Japanese release date	Japanese ISBN
1	April 18, 2008 (original release); April 8, 2016 (re-release)	978-4-09-179026-2 (original release); 978-4-09-167075-5 (re-release)
2	March 6, 2009 (original release); May 10, 2016 (re-release)	978-4-09-179037-8 (original release); 978-4-09-167076-2 (re-release)
3	March 8, 2010 (original release); June 10, 2016 (re-release)	978-4-09-179072-9 (original release); 978-4-09-167077-9 (re-release)

== Reception ==
In "BL Koto Hajime", a monthly column for The Asahi Shimbun Company's Good Life with Books website, Masatoshi Inoue chose Sakura-Gari as his boys' love (BL) manga recommendation for October 2020. Inoue, the head of Honto.jp's BL specialty floor, described Sakura-Gari as a work of complex emotions that cannot, or should not, be reduced to categorizations such as "suspense story" or "love story".
