= Appare Jipangu! =

Japanese manga series

- Cover of volume 1 (2003 edition)

天晴じぱんぐ！
- Manga
- Written by: Yuu Watase
- Published by: Shogakukan
- Magazine: Shōjo Comic
- Original run: 1998 – 2003
- Volumes: 3

Appare Jipangu! (天晴じぱんぐ！; "Bravo Jipangu!") is a Japanese manga series by Yuu Watase. Set in Japan during the Edo period, it follows the life of Yusura, who as a baby, was found under a cherry tree with the "Kongoumaru" (a staff that turns blue when people are sad) by her side. Now fifteen years later, Yusura has become the "hikeshiya" (or "extinguisher of sorrow") and uses the Kongoumaru to 'absorb' people's sadness and hit it back at the people that caused it.

== Characters ==
Yusura (桜桃)
As a child was abandoned by her birth parents and found under a cherry tree. Now the "hikeshiya", she goes around healing people's sadness with her Kongoumaru (金剛丸). Although she loves her adoptive parents, Yusura is still trying to find her birth parents.
Hot-headed and tomboy-ish, she dresses like a boy, and the inability of new characters to identify her gender serves as a running joke through the series. Later she falls in love with Samon. She is 15 years old. Kongomaru was her staff.
Samon (沙門)
A member of the royal family, he is the son of the daimyō. However, his mother was a prostitute and the Daimyo was not too happy to learn of his existence. Yusura met him after saving him from some assassins.
Samon is practically blind and has difficulty seeing without his glasses, often mistaking other objects for Yusura. Then later he falls for Yusura.
Minekichi (峰吉)
He's Yusura's very funny foster brother who always teases her, and he helps her with all the sadness business. Then he came along on her journey to find her real parents. He also likes to play with skeleton puppets that scare people.
Kazanosuke
A ninja whose special power is a bubble attack. After meeting Yusura and her gang, he is hired by Samon to become his bodyguard. However, he is quite fond of hiding in Yusura's shadow instead. A Cola Ninja from the village of Coca. It is hinted that he loves Yusura.
Yasura's Dad
Loves to invent random things. Much of the time they are more of a hindrance than a help but all are amusing. He is a pharmacist.
Oteru
One of Samon's servants.

== Publication ==
Surprisingly, this manga was made around the time of one of her most popular works, Ayashi no Ceres. In one of her "free talk pages," (where the manga artist can talk to her fans about her daily life or things relating to the manga or promoting other works.) She said that the reason why there is such a big difference between the two manga's art is because Ayashi no Ceres is more "Dark and serious," so she gave it a more realistic art style. Appare is drawn with a more typical wide-eyed shōjo look.

This manga had an unusual publishing schedule. In a shōjo manga magazine, there is a restricted number of pages that manga artist can only draw in (16 for weekly shōnen manga and 32–34 for typical monthly shōjo manga). Appare was licensed by Flower Comics, but never ran in the magazine. Instead it was independent and immediately went out to the public in volumes. Watase stated that she did not want to go with the deadlines for the magazine because it was such a light-hearted story that she wanted to go at her own pace. As a result, there were huge gaps between volume publications.

The series was published in Spain by Glénat España as ¡Viva Japón!. A French version was published by Editions Tonkam, but retained the title Appare Jipangu! It was also published in Italy by Planet Manga.
