= Alice 19th =

Japanese manga

- North American cover of the first manga volume

ありす19th (Arisu Naintīnsu)
- Genre: Fantasy, Romance
- Manga
- Written by: Yuu Watase
- Published by: Shogakukan
- English publisher: NA: Viz Media
- Magazine: Shōjo Comic
- Original run: June 20, 2001 – April 24, 2003
- Volumes: 7

Alice 19th (Japanese: ありす19th, Hepburn: Arisu Naintīnsu) is a Japanese shōjo manga written by Yuu Watase. It appeared as a serial in the manga magazine Shōjo Comic.

The heroine's name (Alice), and her encounter with a white rabbit (Nyozeka) starts the storyline. Watase has written that she thought of Alice in Wonderland, by Lewis Carroll, in drafting the characters of Alice Seno and Nyozeka. From there she drafted her own story.

From 2007 Viz Media released Alice 19th in English. The series, which is published in the traditional right-to-left format with foot-noted sound effects, spans a total of seven volumes.

== Plot ==
The story follows Alice Seno, a fifteen-year-old girl forever in the shadow of her older sister Mayura, who excels in everything she undertakes. At her school Alice becomes known as "Mayura's little sister." Older girls, judging Alice too meek to retaliate, torment her relentlessly.

Alice harbors a deep affection for Kyou Wakamiya, a handsome senpai and member – with Mayura – of the school archery team. On the way to school one day, Alice rescues a white rabbit from the road despite the danger to herself, but she is rescued by Kyô and receives from the rabbit a bracelet with a single red stone. The rabbit she saves, however, is no ordinary rabbit. The rabbit reveals her true form to Alice and introduces herself as Nyozeka. Alice is told that she is destined to become a Lotis Master. The Lotis Masters use the power of words and communication to enter the Inner Heart of others. It is a powerful ability to be used carefully as Alice soon finds out.

Using the power of the Lotis Words, which reveal themselves to be in the form of runes, Alice accidentally makes her older sister disappear during a dispute over Kyô, whom Mayura had begun dating. Alice then must use the Lotis Words to try to bring her sister back from the dark. She is joined by Kyô who proves to have the Lotis powers as well, and by Frey, another Lotis master who has trained with the masters and arrives with the intention to marry Alice. Unfortunately, Mayura has been taken by the power of the Maram Words, the dark reflection of the Lotus Words. Their only hope lies in Alice and Kyô becoming the legendary Neo-Masters to discover the lost word binding both Maram and Lotis.

Following the conclusion of the story in volume 7 Ms. Watase appended an extra chapter, 'Bunny Heart', set in China about 900 AD. A young Chinese girl, Rakuen, retrieving water during a time of drought, met Nyozeka, and learned the Lotis word "Dana", water. Ms. Watase concludes the chapter by writing that this girl was an ancestor of Pai Mei-Lin.

== Characters ==
=== Main characters ===
Alice Seno (瀬野 ありす, Seno Arisu)
Fifteen-year-old Alice becomes a Lotis Master when she saves Nyozeka from the middle of the road, using the Lotis Word for courage. Like other Lotis Masters, she begins her incantations with "Na Sadaru Lotis Raan". She and Kyo find the lost word which is "Naamasu Sadarumaara Lootisu Sotiraan". She likes Kyô but cannot muster the courage to tell that to him. She is very quiet and does not have a lot friends.
Despite the fact her sister Mayura is out to kill her, Alice still loves Mayura and feels guilty about hurting her, and she is convinced Mayura will become the sister she was once before. Alice has no trust in herself which causes her to be too afraid to say what is on her mind.

Mayura Seno (瀬野 真由良, Seno Mayura)
Alice's older sister Mayura has beauty and skill at everything. She is on the archery team with Kyô and excels in school. Perhaps her only flaw is her allergy towards animals. She loves Kyô, but, unlike Alice, was able to tell him and worked hard to get him to date her. When Mayura realizes Alice loves Kyô as well, she tries to set Alice up with another boy. She vanishes when Alice accidentally wishes her away and the hatred in her heart makes her an easy target for the Maram Words. She becomes a Maram Master and tries to kill Alice and separate her from Kyô once he ended their romantic relationship due to his feelings for Alice.
Eventually it is revealed that the darkness is Mayura's heart stems not just from Kyô rejecting her for Alice, but also because she felt hurt that Alice would not confide to her about her feelings for Kyô as well.

Kyô Wakamiya (若宮 叶, Wakamiya Kyō)
Kyô, a junior, attends the same school as Alice and Mayura. An orphan, he lives with his aunt and uncle and helps in their cafe making desserts. His father was an abusive drunk and Kyô fears that someday he will be like that too. He dated Mayura and later must deal with his feelings for Alice. Mayura puts a mudoru curse into him that feeds itself from his hatred he feels towards his father, and because of this Alice cannot say anything loving to him or the flames of hate will burn Kyô. The curse can be lifted if he overcomes his own hatred.
Nyozeka (ニョゼカ, Nyozeka)
The rabbit that Alice saves at the beginning of the series emerges as the rabbit destined to find the neo-masters. She then becomes Alice's guide to the Lotis power. She has three forms: a white rabbit, a more anthropomorphic form dressed in ritual robes, and a plushie form for when Alice must go out in public with her.
Frey Weillhausen (フレイヴェルハウゼン)
Frey has studied with the great Lotis Masters and becomes a mentor to both Alice and Kyô. At first he hides from Kyô and Alice the truth of his training and the legend of the Neo-Masters. He is a persistent playboy who is likely to flirt with any girl who catches his eye. Yet under all this hides a more serious person who knows a lot more about the Lotis Words than he lets on. He is also obsessed with jam. Although he may seem happy and energetic, he has a hidden sorrow. He, like Kyô, has feelings for Alice. He first appears near the end of the first volume.
Christopher William Orson Andrew Roland XIII (クリストファー・ウィリアム・オーソン・アンドリュー・ローランド13世, Kurisutofuā Wiriamu Ōson Andoryū Rōrando 13)
The Lotis Master Chris, aged 13, comes from Great Britain. He joins Alice and Kyô and helps them train with the intention of defeating the Maram Masters. He is quite serious, stern, and mature – except whenever desserts are concerned (then he would act like a five-year-old.) Like the other characters, he has a dark secret.
Pai Mei-Lin (白 梅玲, Pai Mei-Rin)
The stylish Mei-Lin comes from Shanghai in China. A Lotis Master like Chris, she intends to help Alice and Kyô to defeat the Maram. While she lived alone in Shanghai, she had plenty of female friends to keep her company and, with her great figure and flawless skin, worked as a model. Because of her strong personality, her only lament is being unable to find a boyfriend. Possessing a strong sense of justice, she is an expert in tai chi.
Billy MacDowell (ビリー・マクドウェル, Birī Makudoweru)
Hailing from the United States of America, Billy, like Chris, is a Lotis Master intending to help Alice and Kyô beat the Maram. Despite his tough exterior, Alice is surprised to learn he works as a postman in a small quiet town. He loves a good fight and is also very kind and generous, and adores children. He has admitted he is sometimes shy, and has a fiancée back in the United States.
Family
In Alice 19th, some of the characters' families, such as Alice's parents and Kyô's uncle Yuki Rengedô and aunt Maki Rengedô, have important roles in the story. Alice and Kyô must repair their relations with their parents as part of their effort to redeem Mayura from the darkness, and Kyô's aunt and uncle must also deal with the darkness in their own hearts so that they may better understand Kyô.

=== Supporting characters ===
Tatsuya Matsujo
A male classmate of Alice's. Mayura notices that Alice was falling in love with Kyô, so she tries to bring Tatsuya and Alice together. Tatsuya notices that Alice is more interested in Kyô and becomes jealous, but when Alice uses the Lotis Words to purify his inner heart, he accepts that Alice has no interest in dating him.
Oishi
A classmate of Alice who bullies her, Oishi has a crush on Kyô. She almost blackmails Kyô to be her boyfriend by threatening to tell his "dark secret;" however, Kyô refuses. Oishi then tells the entire school that Kyô once tried to kill a classmate from another school. It is revealed Oishi suffers from a Maram monster in her that has been in her heart for a very long time. When Alice defeats the Maram monster, Oishi becomes a much nicer person who even begins to support Alice. She is once mentioned in the first chapter of Ceres, Celestial Legend.
Kazuki
A friend of Kyô, Kazuki has a secret crush on Mayura, and she tricks him into separating Alice and Kyô. He gets a Maram into his heart because of his anger towards Alice and Kyô; however, he is able to fight against the Maram and sacrifice himself for Kyô.
Eric
A Lotis Master and the chief at Frey Weilhausen's northern European Lotsuan chapter. He treats a Frey like a son, but he is sickly and becomes disillusioned with the Lotis Words, eventually revealing himself to be a powerful Maram Master.
Samuel
A blond, disturbed teenage boy who is a Maram Master. He lets Mayura use his body so she can wander the outside world without allowing Alice and Kyô to enter her "inner heart". He tries to get Kyô on his side and uses his powers to exploit the darkness in the hearts of Kyô's aunt and uncle. It is revealed he was once part of a church choir and people admired his beautiful voice, but other members from the choir became jealous and put pieces of glass into his food: this caused him to lose his singing voice.
Kayna
A female Maram Master who appears later on the manga. Kayna is 94 years old. She shows a strong hatred towards youth and children. Eventually it becomes clear that her darkness was born due to her lover leaving her for a much younger woman, who called her an "old hag". Her fear is to become old. She has a love of plants, but she laments that she cannot keep them from wilting. She, along with Samuel, is purified by Kyô and Alice.

== Release ==
No.	Release date	ISBN
1	October 26, 2001	4-09-135431-9
2	January 26, 2002	4-09-135432-7
3	April 24, 2002	4-09-135433-5
4	July 26, 2002	4-09-135434-3
5	October 26, 2002	4-09-135435-1
6	January 25, 2003	4-09-135436-X
7	April 24, 2003	4-09-135437-8
