= Arata: The Legend =

Japanese manga series

- Cover of the first tankōbon volume, featuring Arata Hinohara (front) and Kotoha (back)

アラタカンガタリ 〜革神語〜 (Arata Kangatari)
- Genre: Adventure; Isekai
- Manga
- Written by: Yuu Watase
- Published by: Shogakukan
- English publisher: NA: Viz Media
- Imprint: Shōnen Sunday Comics; (tankōbon edition); Shōnen Sunday Comics Special; (Remaster edition)
- Magazine: Weekly Shōnen Sunday (2008–2022); Sunday Webry (2022–2023)
- Original run: October 1, 2008 – November 1, 2023
- Volumes: 24 (tankōbon); 18 (Remaster)
- Anime television series
- Directed by: Woo Hyun Park (chief); Kenji Yasuda
- Written by: Mayori Sekijima
- Music by: Kow Otani
- Studio: Satelight; JM Animation
- Licensed by: NA: Crunchyroll
- Original network: TV Tokyo, TVA, TVO, AT-X
- Original run: April 8, 2013 – July 1, 2013
- Episodes: 12
- icon

Arata: The Legend (Japanese: アラタカンガタリ 〜革神語〜, Hepburn: Arata Kangatari) is a Japanese manga series written and illustrated by Yuu Watase. The series follows two boys, Arata, from the mystical world of Amawakuni, and Arata Hinohara, from modern Japan, who switch places. Framed for treason, Hinohara must master a sacred Hayagami sword to save Amawakuni from rebellion while evading his past bully, Kadowaki, now wielding dark power. Meanwhile, Arata befriends Imina, the true heir to Amawakuni's throne, as they uncover a plot to conquer both worlds.

Arata: The Legend started serialization in Shogakukan's shōnen manga magazine Weekly Shōnen Sunday in October 2008. The series went on hiatus in August 2015 and resumed publication with republished chapters in May 2021 and all-new chapters starting in July of that same year. It finished in Weekly Shōnen Sunday in April 2022 and was transferred to the Sunday Webry website in May of the same year, where it finished in November 2023. Its chapters were first collected in a 24-volume tankōbon edition from January 2009 to September 2015, and a Remaster edition started in July 2013; after the hiatus, the subsequent chapters were only compiled in the latter edition, with the eighteenth and final volume published in December 2023. In North America, the manga is licensed for English release by Viz Media, with the 24 volumes of the tankōbon edition published.

A 12-episode anime television series adaptation by Satelight and Korean studio JM Animation was broadcast on TV Tokyo from April to July 2013.

== Plot ==
Arata of another world called Amawakuni (天和国) and Arata Hinohara of modern-day Japan switch places. An illusion hides the switch from people of both worlds, and Hinohara and Arata pass as each other. Kannagi, a wielder of special sword-spirits called Hayagami (劍神), has led eleven other wielders against their ruler Princess Kikuri and framed Arata, the sole witness. The Imperial Court convicts Arata and exiles him to Gatoya Island, but due to the switch, Hinohara goes in Arata's place.

Kotoha, Arata's childhood friend, accompanies Hinohara and gives him Tsukuyo, a Hayagami that Hinohara activated before his trial. She also gives him a charm Michihi no Tama (ミチヒノタマ), through which he and Arata communicate. Barely alive, Kikuri also speaks to Hinohara through the charm and tasks him with restoring order to Amawakuni. Hinohara escapes Gatoya, learns to use Tsukuyo, and gains allies, including Kannagi. As he defeats the other rebels, Hinohara learns Masato Kadowaki, a bully from his past in modern-day Japan, has followed in his footsteps. After switching places with Harunawa, one of the mysterious Six Shinshō, Kadowaki activates a Hayagami of his own, Orochi, and faces Hinohara in multiple fights. Along the way, Hinohara and Kotoha grow close, and their relationship complicated when Kotoha discovers Hinohara's true identity and when he loses control of his growing power and hurts her.

In modern-day Japan, Arata adjusts to high school and befriends Imina Oribe. Imina, a woman from Kikuri's clan who winded up lost on Earth fifteen years prior, is the true heir. Harunawa, who passes as Kadowaki, plots to kill Imina and end Kikuri's line. Arata and Imina search for information in prophecies on how to foil the Six Shinshō's ambition to rule both Amawakuni and Earth. Harunawa attacks the school and infects the city to augment his powers. Imina counters the outbreak with her Amatsuriki abilities, unique to women of her clan, to protect Arata and the Hinohara family.

== Characters ==
=== In Amawakuni ===
Arata Hinohara (日ノ原 革, Hinohara Arata)
Voiced by: Nobuhiko Okamoto
A high schooler from Japan, he switches places with an Arata of Amawakuni. Shortly after, he becomes a Shō, one chosen to wield the Hayagami Tsukuyo, the god of light, in the form of a sword. He promises Princess Kikuri to help restore her power. Falls in love with Kotoha along the way.
Kotoha (コトハ)
Voiced by: Ayahi Takagaki
Kotoha is Arata's childhood friend who has healing powers and accompanies Hinohara. Like almost everyone else in Awamakuni, she thinks that Hinohara is Arata who lost his memories but later learns his true identity. She is the first person to believe in Hinohara and falls in love with him.
Princess Kikuri (キクリ)
Voiced by: Hibiku Yamamura
The only woman of the Hime Clan in Amawakuni, Kikuri has led the Twelve Shinshō, wielders of elemental deities, and ruled for sixty years. The Twelve's rebellion has left her weakened; only the Amatsuriki, a power unique to the women of her clan, keeps her alive. She tasks Hinohara with restoring order.
Masato Kadowaki (門脇 将人, Kadowaki Masato)
Voiced by: Ryohei Kimura
A friend-turned-bully of Hinohara, he notices that Arata and Hinohara are completely different, switches places with Harunawa, and also arrives in Amawakuni. Wielding the Hayagami Orochi, the god of darkness, in the form of a spear, he seeks to hunt Hinohara and prove himself superior.
Kannagi (カンナギ)
Voiced by: Yūki Ono
One of the Twelve Shinshō, he wields the Hayagami Homura, the god of fire. He leads the coup against Kikuri so that the Shinshō can use their Hayagami without limitations and frames Arata. At first, he leads the manhunt for Arata but later joins Hinohara to get revenge on fellow Shinshō Akachi for killing all his Zokushō (vassals) and stealing his Hayagami.
Mikusa (ミクサ)
A strong warrior, Mikusa had been found near Kando Forest by Kikuri and adopted into the Hime Clan fifteen years ago, meaning she has switched places with Imina and is Japanese.

=== On Earth ===
Arata (アラタ)
Voiced by: Yoshitsugu Matsuoka
Arata from Amawakuni takes Hinohara's place in modern Japan. While adjusting to high school, he communicates with Hinohara through charms Kotoha had given them. He and Imina Oribe, who came to Earth from Amawakuni fifteen years prior, search for prophecies that tell them how to foil the Six Shinshō, who want to dominate both worlds. In the manga, Arata uses an odd cellphone strap infused with Amatsuriki, a power unique to the women of Kikuri's clan, to fight Harunawa, one of the Six, on Earth. Arata looks to avenge his clan and protect Imina.
Imina Oribe (織部 実名, Oribe Imina)
Arata's schoolmate, who resembles Kotoha and can see Arata's true form. Fifteen years ago, Harunawa killed the women of Hime clan. Imina escaped by switching places with Mikusa and has lived in Japan ever since. As the only other woman of the Hime clan, she is Kikuri's heir. Arata and Imina have a close bond, since both feel out of place in Japan, upon discovering they both are from Amawakuni. Arata tries to persuade her to return with him. They care for one another, and Imina considers herself Arata's protector. As the series progresses, Imina gains full access to her Amatsuriki.
Harunawa (ハルナワ)
Voiced by: Akira Ishida
Harunawa is the coldest member of the Six Shō, wielders of Hayagami of the six senses. He wields the Hayagami Bakuto, the god of touch. Harunawa switches with Kadowaki. Fifteen years prior, he took advantage of Kikuri's visit to her dying mother to kill the Hime Clan's women to end Kikuri's line.

== Media ==
=== Manga ===
Cover of the first Remaster edition volume

Written and illustrated by Yuu Watase, Arata: The Legend started in Shogakukan's shōnen manga magazine Weekly Shōnen Sunday on October 1, 2008. In January 2014, Watase announced that the series was heading toward its climax; that same month, Watase posted on her personal blog about negative experiences with a former editor for her series. After a chapter published on February 26 of the same year, Watase put the series on hiatus. The series resumed publication from July 8 to August 26, 2015, before entering another hiatus. In May 2018, Watase posted on Twitter that she was trying to resume the manga that year, adding that she was still recovering from depression. In December 2020, Watase reveled that she had planned the series' remaining plot. Weekly Shōnen Sunday started republishing chapters on May 19, 2021, while all-new chapters started in the magazine on July 7 of the same year. The manga finished publication in the magazine on April 20, 2022, and transferred to the Sunday Webry website on May 4 of the same year. The series finished on November 1, 2023.

Shogakukan collected its chapters in 24 tankōbon volumes, published from January 16, 2009, to September 18, 2015. Shogakukan started re-releasing the series in a two-in-one volume edition, under the title Arata: The Legend – Remaster (アラタカンガタリ〜革神語〜 リマスター版, Arata Kangatari Rimasutā-ban), which includes the original color page chapters from the magazine, corrections, additions, and various other modifications. The first volume was released on July 18, 2013. On May 14, 2021, Watase wrote on her blog that the tankōbon edition would no longer continue, and the series would only continue with the Remaster edition. The eighteenth and last volume was released on December 18, 2023.

In North America, the manga was licensed for English release by Viz Media in 2009. Viz Media published the 24 volumes of the tankōbon edition from March 9, 2010, to August 9, 2016.

=== Anime ===
In December 2012, Weekly Shōnen Sunday announced that the manga would receive an anime television series adaptation. The 12-episode series is produced by Satelight and Korean studio JM Animation, and was broadcast on TV Tokyo from April 8 to July 1, 2013. The opening theme is "Genesis Aria", performed by Sphere, and the ending theme is "The Misfit Go", performed by Oldcodex. The series was streamed by Crunchyroll in the United States and Canada.

== Reception ==
Rebecca Bundy of Anime News Network gave the first volume an overall B+ for "Great art and character designs; plus, Watase's ability to create interesting lore is as sharp as ever." She also noted, however, that the "[p]athetic, cowardly main character makes everything involving him painful to read." Deb Aoki of About.com noted that the plot is "fairly formulaic fantasy fare that's just a bit too predictable to offer fans something truly fresh and new" but that the series has her "hooked." Todd Douglass of Blogcritics.org wrote that the first volume is "strongly recommended," despite some reservations. Christopher Nadolsk of Mania.com said that the first volume offers "an entertaining and eye-pleasing escapist fantasy read."
