= Shishunki Miman Okotowari =

Japanese manga series

- Cover of the first Japanese volume

思春期未満お断り
- Genre: Romance
- Manga
- Written by: Yuu Watase
- Published by: Shogakukan
- Magazine: Shōjo Comic
- Original run: 1990 – September 1991
- Volumes: 3
- Manga

Zoku Shishunki Miman Okotowari
- Written by: Yuu Watase
- Published by: Shogakukan
- Magazine: Shōjo Comic
- Original run: 1992 – 1994
- Volumes: 3
- Manga

Shishunki Miman Okotowari Kanketsuhen
- Written by: Yuu Watase
- Published by: Shogakukan
- Magazine: Shōjo Comic
- Original run: 1998 – unknown
- Volumes: 1
- Novel series
- Written by: Megumi Nishizaki
- Illustrated by: Yuu Watase
- Published by: Shogakukan
- Volumes: 4
- Shishunki Miman CD Book
- ISBN 4-09-907103-0

Shishunki Miman Okotowari (思春期未満お断り; lit. No Pre-Teens Allowed or No Interest in Prepubescence) is a Japanese manga created by Yuu Watase and serialized in the manga magazine Shōjo Comic. There are two sequels to this manga, Zoku Shishunki Miman Okotowari and Shishunki Miman Okotowari Kanketsuhen.

== Plot summary ==
Following the death of her mother, Asuka Higuchi travels to Tokyo to search for her long lost father. When she meets up with her half-siblings completely by coincidence, she learns that even they have never seen or even met their father. Asuka comes to stay at the Sudou residence with her younger brother and sister in hopes they will be one day reunited with their estranged father.

=== Zoku Shishunki Miman Okotowari ===
After learning that Yashiro-sensei's true name is Takashi Sudou, Asuka has at last found her biological father. However, the three siblings also discover that Yashiro-sensei is actually the father of only Asuka and Kazusa; Manato's father was the real Yashiro and he has no blood relation to either Asuka or Kazusa. Takashi Sudou took on Yashiro's name after his senpai (Yashiro) died and adopted Yashiro's son, Manato, as well.

=== Shishunki Miman Okotowari Kanketsuhen ===
The concluding chapter to the Shishunki series. Two other bonus stories are contained in this one volume edition.

== Characters ==
Asuka Higuchi (樋口 飛鳥, Higuchi Asuka)
A reformed bad girl who now only dreams of meeting her father after her mother dies of an illness. She is very athletic and is particularly good at gymnastics. When she discovers she has two half-siblings, Manato and Kazusa, she immediately takes on the role of a reliable and protective older sister.
Manato Sudou (須藤 真斗, Sudou Manato)
He was thought to be Asuka's half-brother but it turns out that he was the son of Yashiro-sensei's best friend. Like Asuka, Manato once ran in a gang, but has somewhat reformed himself. He has looked after Kazusa ever since they were children, which is why he is naturally very protective of her.
Kazusa Sudou (須藤 和沙, Sudou Kazusa)
Asuka's half-sister, who utterly despises her older sister for butting into her cozy little life with Manato. She has a serious brother complex and will do anything to keep Manato from accepting Asuka as their sister.
Tooru Hayami (速水 透, Hayami Tooru)
A bad boy in general, Hayami has been interested in Kazusa up until he got beat up by Asuka for intimidating Kazusa. He soon develops an unrequited crush on Asuka.
Youko Kamiya (神谷 陽子, Kamiya Youko)
The school class president and captain of the gymnastics club. Asuka becomes her biggest rival in both gymnastics and for Manato's love.
Yashiro-sensei (矢城先生, Yashiro-sensei)
A recently hired teacher at their school who seems to take an interest in Asuka. He is later revealed to be the missing father of Asuka and her siblings.

== Gaiden Novels ==
Yu Watase and Megumi Nishizaki teamed up to write and illustrate four different novels for the Shishunki series.

1. Tokubetsu Hen; Mister Sun * Brother Moon
2. Netsuai Hen; Lonely Hurricane
3. Hyuusetu Hen; St. Crystal Boys
4. Bangai Hen; Dynamite * Generation
