= Fushigi Yûgi: Byakko Senki =

Japanese manga series by Yuu Watase

- Original cover of the first volume of the series

ふしぎ遊戯 白虎仙記
- Genre: Fantasy, romance
- Manga

Fushigi Yûgi: Byakko Ibun
- Written by: Yuu Watase
- Published by: Shogakukan
- Magazine: Monthly Flowers
- Published: February 28, 2015
- Manga

Fushigi Yûgi: Byakko Senki
- Written by: Yuu Watase
- Published by: Shogakukan
- English publisher: NA: Viz Media
- Imprint: Flower Comics Alpha
- Magazine: Monthly Flowers
- Original run: August 28, 2017 – present
- Volumes: 7
- Related works
- Fushigi Yûgi; Fushigi Yûgi: Genbu Kaiden

Fushigi Yûgi: Byakko Senki (Japanese: ふしぎ遊戯 白虎仙記) is a Japanese manga series written and illustrated by Yuu Watase. It began with a one-shot, Fushigi Yûgi: Byakko Ibun (ふしぎ遊戯 白虎異聞), published in Shogakukan's Monthly Flowers magazine in February 2015. The full series, Byakko Senki, launched in the same magazine in August 2017. The series was officially on hiatus since August 2018 after missing the June 2018 release, due to Watase's health issues, but has since resumed as of May 2024.

Byakko Senki is a prequel to Fushigi Yûgi, a sequel to Fushigi Yûgi: Genbu Kaiden, and the final installment in the Fushigi Yûgi "Four Gods" storyline. It tells the story of the Priestess of Byakko, Suzuno Ohsugi, in the land of Xi-Lang after she was transported into The Universe of the Four Gods. The Byakko Ibun one-shot, on the other hand, sets the mood for Byakko Senki by introducing one of its protagonists, a girl from Xi-Lang named Ning-Lan, and her companion Nirusha.

In Japan, Shogakukan published the series' first compiled volume in April 2018. In North America, Viz Media licensed the manga for an English-language release and published its first volume in August 2020.

== Synopsis ==
=== Byakko Ibun ===
Some time between Genbu Kaiden and Byakko Senki, a man named Nirusha travels to a small village in the country of Xi-Lang. The village is under attack by a wild tiger, and the only person who agrees to help him strike it down is the youngest daughter of the local inn keeper, a little girl named Rei-Pin. Nirusha then hides from the suspicious villagers, but Rei-Pin tries to befriend him. It is revealed that she has a terrible life, full of neglect and abuse from her family, and Nirusha is the first person who has ever been kind to her. Nirusha renames her "Ning-Lan" and tells her about his past, and the two try to help one another.

=== Byakko Senki ===
In 1923, almost immediately following the epilogue of Genbu Kaiden, the scholar Takao Ohsugi brings the book The Universe of Four Gods back to Tokyo under the will of the deceased translator of the book, Einosuke Okuda, to find a way to destroy it or seal it away. No matter what he does, however, the book is not affected by anything. Takao fears deeply for his 8-year-old daughter Suzuno Ohsugi, who may be trapped in the book just like Takiko Okuda (the Genbu Kaiden heroine, whom Suzuno considered an older sister figure); even more, the book is sometimes found near Suzuno.

Months later, the Great Kantō earthquake takes place. The Ohsugi house collapses, Takao's wife Tamayo is killed, and Takao is mortally wounded, but then Suzuno turns out to be all right and has the Universe in her hands. Takao realizes that this is the doing of the Universe and that Suzuno is destined to be a priestess. With his last words, he orders Suzuno to open the book and get inside it for her own safety, telling her that she'll find her own destiny like Takiko.

Lost in the wide desert, Suzuno meets Ning-Lan, an outcast young woman (and one of the protagonists of Byakko Ibun) who can transform into a fierce tiger. She also meets the kindhearted brothers Kasal and Karm Laotse. After a short time, the three realize that Suzuno fits the description of the outlandish priestess who is destined to summon the godly beast of Byakko and save the country from the inevitable peril. When Ning-Lan is tasked to escort Suzuno to the royal guards, the mentally unstable girl snaps and attempts to kill Suzuno, but she is transported back to reality. Ning-Lan then imposes herself as the priestess, to avenge her tragic past in which she was abused by near every person she met, save for a man named Nirusha (the other Byakko Ibun lead).

Suzuno finds herself all alone in the destroyed Tokyo, but by a stroke of luck she's found by Dr. Oikawa, a friend of her father and Takiko's former fiancé. The kind doctor adopts her and three other orphans (Seiji Horie, Hideo, and Kenichi), but Suzuno loses sight of the book itself.

Ten years pass. Suzuno is in her last year of high school and has become a promising artist, but then finds the Universe in her school's library. This triggers her lost memories of her adventures inside the book, so she starts researching its translator. Soon, she and her foster father Oikawa discover everything about the tragedy of the Okuda family, Takiko's position as the Priestess of Genbu, and the truth of the book: that the priestess is to be devoured by the godly beast upon being granted all three wishes. Scared and hesitant about this grim destiny, Suzuno accepts the proposal of her adopted brother Seiji to escape that fate, but the book suddenly appears and absorbs her right before the eyes of Oikawa and her fiancé.

== Characters ==
=== Reality ===
Suzuno Ohsugi (大杉 鈴乃, Ōsugi Suzuno)
Suzuno is the girl destined to become the Priestess of Byakko. She is a quiet, kind highschool student who resembles the Yamato nadeshiko archetype.
Suzuno first enters the Universe of the Four Gods world as a little girl in 1923, during the Great Kantō earthquake that kills her parents and destroys her home. After a day or so, she is sent back to Tokyo and, as Dr. Oikawa takes her in, she loses sight of the book. She doesn't find it again until 10 years later, in 1933, and is taken inside it for a second time.
Tamayo Ohsugi (大杉 珠代, Ōsugi Tamayo)
Suzuno's mother, a kindhearted housewife. She also dies in the earthquake, and when Suzuno is sent into the book, she's wearing her mother's best kimono as a sort-of coat.
Takao Ohsugi (大杉 高雄, Ōsugi Takao)
Suzuno's father, who showed up in the Genbu Kaiden story. He is a journalist and writer who worked for the scholar Einosuke Okuda and inherited the Four Gods manuscript. He intends to destroy it so Suzuno and other girls won't be taken inside it, but no matter what methods he uses, the book "survives" due to its magic. He dies in the Kantō earthquake, but before that he sends Suzuno inside the book for her protection.
Oikawa (及川)
A physician also seen in Fushigi Yûgi: Genbu Kaiden, an old friend of the Okuda and Ohsugi families. He proposed to Takiko Okuda, and while he was initially accepted, he was shortly turned down. He survives the Kantō earthquake and adopts Suzuno, Seiji, Kenichi, and Hidero. In Byakko Senki, Oikawa learns about the truth of Takiko's death as the Priestess of Genbu and dissuades Suzuno to follow Takiko's footstep.
Seiji Horie (堀江 正司, Horie Seiji)
An older boy who rescues Suzuno from child traffickers after the Great Kantō earthquake, prompting their adoptions by Dr. Oikawa. Years later, he enrolls in the Imperial Japanese Army Academy to further research the book The Universe of Four Gods, and by that time, he proposes to Suzuno.

=== The Universe of Four Gods ===
Nirusha (ニルシャ) / Raneisei (ラネイセイ) / Miboshi (箕宿)
The younger self of the cruel Seiryuu Celestial Warrior Miboshi, and one of the protagonists from Byakko Ibun. He is a quiet and aloof spell-caster who travels around looking for tigers to hunt. He arrives to Rei-Pin's village and strikes a friendship with her.
Rei-Pin (レイピン) / Ning-Lan (寧蘭, Neiran)
The other Byakko Ibun protagonist, a little girl who lives in a village in the Xi-Lang empire and is badly abused by her family. She strikes a friendship with Nirusha, who helps her start working towards her own self-improvement. Unbeknownst to her, however, she has a mysterious heritage.
Ning-Lan reappears on her own in Byakko Senki, as a powerful but bitter and deeply hurt traveler and sorceress. She's the first person that a young Suzuno properly interacts with in Xi-Lang, and they're both taken in by the Laotse brothers.
Tatara / Kasaru Laotse (婁宿)
One of the Byakko Celestial Warriors, and Suzuno's love who controls plants. His original name was "Karumu", but after his older brother Kasaru died, he took on the name Kasaru in accordance with the Laotse family tradition that the "eldest son" inherits the name "Kasaru".
He is the benefactor who rescued Suzuno and Neiran who had collapsed in the desert together with his brother. He has brown skin and black hair that falls to his shoulders and is tied up on the left side. Although he is a boy, he was able to see through Suzuno's bluff quickly and comfort her, and is the first person to realize that she is the Priestess of Byakko.
He was also from an apparently affluent family in a small Xi-Lang village. However, a sandstorm and an earthquake destroyed his hometown. Ever since then the brothers have traveled together through Xi-Lang, making their lives as merchants, with Kasaru raising him as well as possible.
In the first work, the Divine Beast did not grant his wish to "live together in the world of books" with Suzuno, who was in love with him, so he stopped time in his body with Subaru's magic and continued to protect the Divine Treasure at the Byakko Temple. Because of this, he has a young appearance as if he is living in the era of this work, which is 90 years before the first work, but when he leaves the temple, his body ages rapidly and his lifespan is shortened in a flash.
Tokaki / Ranva Ham (奎宿)
Tokaki is another Byakko Celestial Warrior, seen in the original series as an elderly martial artist. Here he appears at his prime, as a Xi-Lang palace guard who rescues Suzuno when she reappears in the world of the book. He at first intends to ask Suzuno to spend the night with him as a reward for saving her, but seems to drop the matter when he deduces that she is the priestess.
Toroki / Akuir (觜宿)
Toroki is one of the Byakko Celestial Warriors, newly introduced in Byakko Senki, currently the oldest member but chronologically the first of the seven to be born. He's the third member of the Byakko Celestial Warriors to join and serving Suzuno, the priestess of Byakko. A wise elderly man who is a painter and uses his giant paint brush as a combative weapon to cast magic and protective barriers, he's a former leader of the Crow People, a tribe that resides in the desert areas of Sairou. He lives alongside his son, Kirish, the current leader of the people and his grandson, Jamur and great grand daughter, Mefur.
Subaru / Durin Kayan (昴宿)
Subaru is a female Byakko Celestial Warrior, also seen in the original series, as an elderly woman who marries to Tokaki. Born from the Kayan Family, in her younger years, she was a dancer who is a master of the Shuixiu dance and a member of a travelling dance troupe who performs entertainment across various towns and cities in Sairou. She first met Suzuno and her group in the town of Hakurankutsu while also crossing paths with Tokaki as well, whom they met once before when the latter was working as a courier but got wasted and drunk, ended up throwing arms around her before getting punched off to the face during a dance performance in the city of Seisha several years ago.
She saved Suzuno (who uses the name 'Rin' to hide her identity along with her other Warriors, who uses their real names) from being chased down by the Hakurankutsu guards, due to being labeled as a "False Priestess" and wanted by the government. The two both quickly became friends, however, despite unaware of Suzuno's true identity, she harbours a deep resentment against the Priestess of Byakko and her Celestial Warriors, believing that the mark she got bestowed during her birth to be a curse by the priestess, with the intention of taking her out and making her 'disappear'.

The reason for her resentment was because, long ago, she lost her fiancé, Anan, in a rockslide and he lost his life. Devastated by his death, she suddenly awakes her celestial warrior ability and her mark, allowing her to reverse time on her fiancé to back a day ago, bringing him back to life. However, her using that ability put a cost into her, unable to bear any children and having a future with Anan. This leads to her leaving him by her own choice, despite him wanting to be by her side, even after learning what happened.
Karasuki / Ruda (參宿)
Karasuki is another new Byakko Celestial Warrior, who is introduce in Byakko Senki, a little girl who is one of the members of a female band of deadly assassins for hire known as the Yè Huá, she is trained in the arts of assassination and has the ability to use shadow manipulation.
Amefuri (畢宿)
Amefuri is another new member of the Byakko Celestial Warriors, introduced in Byakko Senki, a masked blindfolded, hooded 15-year-old boy whose distinct features are his white skin, platinum golden hair and blue eyes. Born from the Hin Tribe, he's currently held captive by the Sangha in a Western Vihara of Bunto-In. Nothing much is known about his ability and personality, but rumors say it is poison or a curse, and he will bring harm to all who touches him and, as a result, collapse from it.

== Publication ==
Fushigi Yûgi: Byakko Senki is written and illustrated by Yuu Watase. It started as a 51-page one-shot, Fushigi Yûgi: Byakko Ibun, published in the April 2015 issue of Shogakukan's josei manga magazine Monthly Flowers on February 28, 2015. Watase launched the full series, Byakko Senki, two years later in the October 2017 issue of Monthly Flowers on August 28, 2017. The manga was serialized every other month until chapter 5 was released on April 28, 2018. After missing a release in June 2018, it was officially placed on hiatus on August 28, 2018, due to Watase's "poor physical condition". The series resumed on May 28, 2024, in Monthly Flowers with chapter 6 and began following a monthly release schedule.

Shogakukan published the first compiled volume of Byakko Senki under the Flower Comics Alpha imprint on April 10, 2018. The second compiled volume was released on August 9, 2024. Viz Media licensed the manga in English and published the first volume under the Shojo Beat imprint on August 4, 2020. At the end of the first volume, Watase revealed that Byakko Senki will be the final installment in the Fushigi Yûgi "Four Gods" storyline; she vowed to "work hard to finish the story", despite her health issues.

== Reception ==
Caitlin Moore of Anime News Network called Fushigi Yûgi: Byakko Senki a "must-read for longtime Fushigi Yûgi fans" and "worth a look even for newcomers to the saga." She praised its "gorgeous" artwork and "strong characterization", noting that Watase has a "gift for ... communicating their characters' mental and emotional states without them needing to say a word." However, Moore criticized the first volume for feeling "more like a prologue than anything else", something she said she "wouldn't take issue with" if the series hadn't been on hiatus since 2018. Krystallina and Helen of TheOASG echoed these sentiments in their review; they called Byakko Senki a "beautiful, nostalgia-filled return to Watase's biggest classic", but said the manga's slow set-up and the wait for subsequent volumes made it "hard to give it an enthusiastic recommendation". Anthony Gramuglia of Comic Book Resources, on the other hand, praised Byakko Senki as "absolutely incredible" and "essential reading for any fan of fantasy manga." He felt that, with its first volume, the series is "managing to surpass the original" Fushigi Yûgi.
