= Imadoki! =

Japanese manga series

- Cover of first manga volume

イマドキ!
- Genre: Romance, comedy
- Manga
- Written by: Yuu Watase
- Published by: Shogakukan
- English publisher: AUS: Madman Entertainment; NA: Viz Media
- Magazine: Shōjo Comic
- Original run: May 2000 – July 2001
- Volumes: 5

Imadoki! (イマドキ!; "Nowadays!") is a Japanese manga written and illustrated by Yuu Watase. The manga is five volumes long. It has been licensed in North America by Viz Media.

== Plot ==
Yamazaki Tanpopo moves from Hokkaidō to Tokyo in order to begin high school in an entirely new environment. When she goes to see her new school, Meio Academy, she meets a young man who is replanting a Tanpopo (dandelion) flower. At school the next day, Tanpopo is not only amazed by the modern facilities but also that she is in the same class as the young man she met the day before: Kugyou Kouki, the son of the owner of Meio. When she greets him, Kouki pretends not to know her and she is shocked that he would act so differently from their previous meeting.

Meanwhile, the students at the school discover Tanpopo is a commoner from the country side and begin to bully her. In an effort to change the social hierarchy of the school and also find some new friends, Tanpopo cheerfully starts the "Planting Club". Soon, she attracts the attention of students like the insincerely kind Saionji Tsukiko and Kouki, who begins to show his kinder side. However, just as Tanpopo and Kouki's friendship develops and their gardening club grows, secrets of Kugyou family life are revealed. Increasing tensions result as Tanpopo begins to fall in love with Kouki and he reciprocates, though is held back as he is engaged to another girl of the same status.

== Characters ==
Tanpopo Yamazaki (山崎たんぽぽ, Yamazaki Tanpopo)
Tanpopo is the main character of the manga, and the majority of the story focuses on her ventures and relationships. Tanpopo, a "country girl", originally lived in Hokkaido with her grandparents, but moved to Tokyo to attend Meio Academy. Tanpopo is both claustrophobic and afraid of the dark, as she was trapped in her parents' car after a crash that killed them both.
Kouki Kugyou (九卿公暉, Kugyō Kōki)
Kouki is the main male lead in the manga, and Tanpopo's main love interest. He is a serious young man, and somewhat burdened by his family responsibilities. As he is the richest of all of the students in his school, Kouki feels obligated to live up to the standards that others place on him. Kouki's favorite hobby is gardening, and he carries a gardening scoop with him at all times.
Aoi Kyougoku (京極 葵, Kyōgoku Aoi)
Aoi is a computer genius with an unusual sense of humor, which contributes to the series' comic relief. He is nicknamed "Flippy" by Tanpopo due to his occasional mentally unstable behavior. He initially hates and antagonizes both Kouki and Tanpopo, but eventually becomes good friends with both of them.
Tsukiko Saionji (西園寺月子, Saionji Tsukiko)
Tsukiko is Tanpopo's first friend at Meio Academy. Though she appears rather innocent, Tsukiko originally is not very sweet at all, but her friendship with Tanpopo gradually softens her personality and she becomes more caring and loyal. She has her heart set on marrying into the Kugyou family, specifically Kouki, although she eventually gets over this longing after realizing Kouki and Tanpopo's feelings for each other.
Arisa Uchimura (内村有佐, Uchimura Arisa)
Arisa is a Ganguro or Kogal. She wears heavy white makeup and has very tanned skin, earning her the nickname "reverse raccoon". She prefers partying to schoolwork and has a reputation for being a party girl, but after meeting Tanpopo and discovering that she is pregnant by Ogata, she begins to change for the better.
Erika Yanahara (柳原江里花, Yanahara Erika)
Erika was originally supposed to marry Youji Kugyou, but after he ran away, she was left as Kouki's responsibility. She loves Kouki as she once loved Youji, but seems to be marrying him only because it is expected of her by her family.
Youji Kugyo (九卿耀司, Kugyō Yōji)
Youji is Kouki's older brother. He is a free spirit, and runs away from the pressures of his high-status family to become a photographer.
Ogata
Ogata is one of the most popular, and powerful, students at Meio Academy. He is extremely jealous of Kouki due to his family's wealth and status.
Poplar (ポプラ)
Poplar is Tanpopo's pet fox.

== Volumes ==
Volume 1: Dandelion, Volume 2: Magnolia, Volume 3: Daffodil, Volume 4: Rose, Volume 5: Poppy

=== Japanese ===
Listed below are all Japanese Imadoki! tankōbon.

1. ISBN 4-09-137473-5 published in August 2000
2. ISBN 4-09-137474-3 Published in November 2000
3. ISBN 4-09-137475-1 published in February 2001
4. ISBN 4-09-137476-X published in May 2001
5. ISBN 4-09-137477-8 published in July 2001
