= Yuu Watase =

Japanese manga artist (born 1970)

Yuu Watase 渡瀬 悠宇
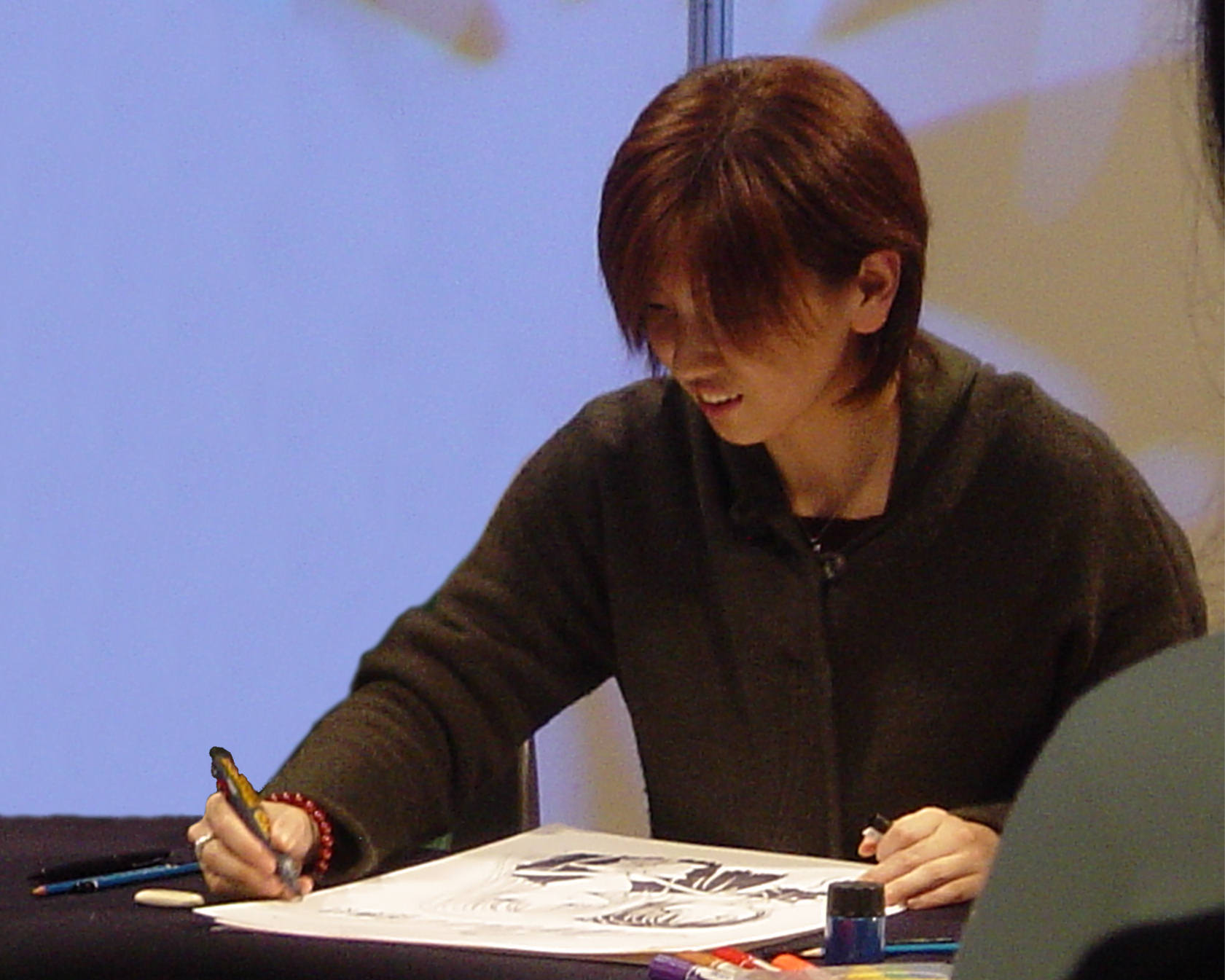
- Watase illustrating a sample of Ceres, Celestial Legend at Lucca Comics 2004 in Italy
- Born: March 5, 1970 (age 56) Kishiwada, Osaka, Japan
- Area: Manga artist
- Notable works: Fushigi Yûgi; Ceres, Celestial Legend; Arata: The Legend
- Awards: 43rd Shogakukan Manga Award, shōjo category

Yuu Watase (Note: "Yuu Watase" is a pen name. It is romanized as "Yû Watase" in earlier printings of Viz Media's publications of Fushigi Yûgi, Alice 19th, and Ceres, Celestial Legend. In Viz Media's Fushigi Yûgi: Genbu Kaiden and Absolute Boyfriend, her name is romanized as "Yuu Watase". In Chuang Yi's English-language versions of Fushigi Yugi (spelled without a macron or circumflex), her name is romanized as "Yu Watase".) (渡瀬 悠宇, Watase Yuu; born March 5, 1970) is a Japanese manga artist. She debuted in 1989 at the age of 18 with the short story "Pajama de Ojama" (パジャマでおじゃま, "An Intrusion in Pajamas") and has since published more than 50 volumes of one-shots and long-running manga series. One of her most popular titles is Fushigi Yûgi. In 1998, Watase won the 43rd Shogakukan Manga Award in the shōjo (girls') category for Ceres, Celestial Legend. In 2008, she began her first shōnen (boys') serialization, Arata: The Legend.

== Early career and methods ==
Watase was born on March 5, 1970, in Kishiwada, Osaka.

Watase developed an interest in drawing manga at a young age. However, Watase did not receive any formal training until after high school when she went to a private art school. There she was taught how to draw manga, but because her first short story, "Pajama de Ojama", had already debuted, Watase quit in the middle of it.

Watase prefers to work with more traditional methods, because she believes the traditional methods have more feelings. Despite finding new media jarring, Watase has expressed a desire to work with new media as well. While Watase mostly works with colored inks and markers, she has used digital programs such as Adobe Photoshop to enhance traditional work.

== Issues in career ==
In a 2014 blog post, Watase detailed some of the issues that she faced as a manga artist. A former editor for Arata: The Legend continuously asked Watase to redraw scenes that he did not like or understand. Watase was doing redraws all day and pulling late nights just to meet the next morning's deadlines. Because of the constant cycle, Watase began to lose interest in working on the manga for the fans or even the story. She was simply working to try and get it approved for the weekly publication.

== Personal life ==
In 2019, Watase came out as X-gender, a Japanese non-binary gender identity. Following the announcement, an editor for Viz Media's Shojo Beat imprint clarified that Watase's pronouns in English are still "she" and "her".

== Works ==
=== Watase Yuu Flower Manga ===
- Fushigi Yûgi – 18 vols.
- Fushigi Yûgi: Genbu Kaiden – 12 vols.
- Fushigi Yûgi: Byakko Ibun – (oneshot)
- Fushigi Yûgi: Byakko Senki – ongoing, first vol. released in April 2018. On hiatus from May 2018 (officially August 2018) – May 2024, resuming May 28th on a monthly schedule.
- Shishunki Miman Okotowari – 3 vols.
- Zoku Shishunki Miman Okotowari – 3 vols.
- Shishunki Miman Okotowari Kanketsu Hen – 1 vol.
- Epotoransu! Mai – 2 vols.
- Ceres, Celestial Legend (Ayashi no Ceres) – 14 vols.
- Appare Jipangu! – 3 vols.
- Imadoki! – 5 vols.
- Alice 19th – 7 vols.
- Absolute Boyfriend (Zettai Kareshi) – 6 vols.
- Sakura-Gari – 3 vols.

=== Shōnen Sunday Manga ===
- Arata: The Legend (Arata Kangatari) – 24 vols.

=== Watase Yuu Masterpiece Collection ===
1. Gomen Asobase!
2. Magical
3. Otenami Haiken!
4. Suna no Tiara
5. Mint de Kiss Me

=== YuuTopia Collection ===
1. Oishii Study
2. Musubiya Nanako

=== Yuu Watase Best Selection ===
- Sunde ni Touch
1. Sunde ni TOUCH
2. COUPLE
3. Hatsuki Triangle
4. Houkago Gensou
5. 700 Nichi no Blue
- Perfect Lovers
1. PERFECT LOVERS
2. Otome no Jijyou
3. Genseika
4. Mint de Kiss Me
5. Pajama de Ojama
6. Pajama de Meiro (Labyrinth)

=== Watase Yuu Flower Manga Deluxe, Kanzenban, Shogakukan Bunko ===
==== Bunkoban ====
- Fushigi Yūgi Bunko – 10 vols.
- Ayashi no Ceres (Ceres, Celestial Legend) Bunko – 7 vols.
- Alice 19th Bunko – 4 vols.
- Zettai Kareshi Bunko – 3 vols.
- Imadoki! Bunko – 3 vols.
- Shishunki Miman Okotowari Bunko – 3 vols.

==== Kanzenban ====
- Fushigi Yūgi Kanzenban – 9 vols.

==== Flower Manga Deluxe ====
1. Shishunki Miman Okotowari
2. Shishunki Miman Okotowari/Zoku Shishunki Miman Okotowari
3. Zoku Shishunki Miman Okotowari
4. Pajama de Ojama
5. Mint de Kiss Me
6. Epotoransu! Mai

=== Artbooks ===
- Watase Yuu Illustration Collection Fushigi Yūgi
- Watase Yuu Illustration Collection – Part 2 Fushigi Yūgi Animation World
- "Ayashi no Ceres" Illustration Collection Tsumugi Uta ~Amatsu Sora Naru Hito o Kofutote~
- Yuu Watase Post Card Book I
- Yuu Watase Post Card Book II

=== Novels ===
- Shishunki Miman Okotowari – 4 vols.
- Fushigi Yūgi – 18 vols.
- Ayashi no Ceres – 6 vols.
- Fushigi Yūgi: Genbu Kaiden – 1 vol.
- Absolute Boyfriend – 6 vols.
- Masei Kishin Den (Illustration)
- Yada ze! (Illustration)
- Piratica (Illustration)
