= Fushigi Yûgi: Genbu Kaiden =

Japanese manga series by Yuu Watase

- Third volume cover

ふしぎ遊戯 玄武開伝
- Genre: Adventure, fantasy, romance
- Manga
- Written by: Yuu Watase
- Published by: Shogakukan
- English publisher: AUS: Madman Entertainment; NA: Viz Media
- Imprint: Flower Comics
- Magazine: Shōjo Comic Zōkan; (2003–2004); Perfect World Fushigi Yûgi; (2004–2008); Rinka; (2010–2012); Zōkan Flowers; (2012–2013)
- Original run: March 15, 2003 – February 14, 2013
- Volumes: 12
- Related works
- Fushigi Yûgi; Fushigi Yûgi: Byakko Senki

Fushigi Yûgi: Genbu Kaiden (Japanese: ふしぎ遊戯 玄武開伝; lit. "Mysterious Game: Legend of Genbu") is a Japanese manga series written and illustrated by Yuu Watase. A prequel to Watase's Fushigi Yûgi, it details the creation of The Universe of the Four Gods and tells the full story of the Priestess of Genbu. The manga was initially serialized in Shōjo Comic Zōkan beginning in 2003. It moved to Perfect World Fushigi Yûgi in 2004 and ran until the magazine's cancellation in 2008. Watase then placed the manga on hiatus for two years due to her health issues and other work commitments. Genbu Kaiden resumed serialization in Rinka in 2010. When Rinka folded in 2012, the manga moved once again to Zōkan Flowers, where it ended its serialization in 2013. Genbu Kaiden was collected in twelve tankōbon volumes published in Japan by Shogakukan. It is licensed for an English-language release in North America by Viz Media. In addition to the manga, Genbu Kaiden inspired five audio drama CDs produced by Marine Entertainment and an adventure video game created by Idea Factory.

== Characters ==
Takiko Okuda (奥田 多喜子, Okuda Takiko)
Voiced by: Satsuki Yukino (drama CD, game)
A seventeen-year-old schoolgirl whose mother has recently died of tuberculosis and whose father seems to care more about his research than his own family. The storyline reveals her as the Priestess of Genbu, with the destiny of summoning the god Genbu with her own will after she has gathered the Celestial Warriors, and having it grant three wishes of her choosing. Takiko is impulsive and strong-willed, though she can be insecure at times. She can fight well with a naginata, a spear-like weapon, and does well in her studies. Takiko was in love with Takao Ohsugi, a friend of her father's, but her love was unrequited. She and Uruki both try to deny their growing love for one another. Later they accept it, though choose to ignore their feelings for fear of it getting in the way of their duties. Near the end, they marry and become the rulers of Hokkan (Bei Jia). Takiko's father realizes they are connected by blood and takes his own life to prevent Takiko from being devoured by Genbu, effectively ending her life as well. Takiko dies having only used two of her three wishes. However, she placed an unvoiced wish which was for her and Uruki to remain together; it didn't matter at what time or in which world, as long as they were together. Her third wish was finally granted one hundred years later when she and Uruki were reunited for eternity.
Uruki (女宿) / Rimudo Roun (リムド・ロウン, Rimudo Roun)
Voiced by: Takahiro Sakurai (male form) and Miki Nagasawa (female form) (drama CD, game)
Uruki is the first Genbu Celestial Warrior that Takiko meets, as well as the crown prince of Hokkan. He was hunted down because of a fake prophecy given by the oracle 1. Though he initially refuses profusely to join Takiko, he eventually reveals himself to the enemy and has no choice but to tag along with her. Rimudo, as a Celestial Warrior, has the ability to change his gender. Rimudo has killed a thousand people with his Wind Power and is wanted throughout the world of the book. He is referred to in a great variety of ways: Wind Demon, Outlaw, and most famously; Rimudo, the merciless wind slasher. Uruki shows to change very greatly throughout the prequel, considering that he realizes the value of love and friends at the end. In the end he has the opportunity to kill his father but does not. However another man takes the opportunity and finishes the Emperor. Uruki becomes Emperor Rimudo. After Takiko's death and the peace treaty between the warring lands, Uruki lives for another hundred years before dying and going onto eternity with Takiko.
Tomite (虚宿) / Chamuka Tan (チャムカ・ターン, Chamuka Tān)
Voiced by: Tetsuya Iwanaga (drama CD, game)
Sixteen-year-old Tomite is a bounty hunter from the Ha tribe and Hikitsu's childhood friend. He is a bit of a pervert, but sensitive about his mother Boraate (Borate). His mark means "emptiness" or "void" and he is a master archer. Combined with his ability to create ice, Tomite is able to shoot arrows of ice. He is the first Celestial warrior that Takiko convinces to join her. Similar to Uruki, the first found, Tomite refuses to acknowledge his destiny until his mother takes the blow of arrows for Takiko and begs him to protect the priestess. His village is in a delicate position with the Kotou (Qu-dong) army. Tomite appears to be jealous of Uruki concerning his relationship with Takiko, possibly because he has some feelings for her. However the author has stated they have a kind of brotherly/sisterly relationship. He later gains a love interest in the form of Hikitsu's sister, Ayla. Tomite dies in the end protecting Takiko while she summons Genbu in the midst of a full on attack on the Capital by Qu-Dong. Known to fans of the original Fushigi Yûgi, Tomite and his friend Hikitsu became the guardians of the Shinzaho of the Genbu priestess after their deaths.
Hatsui (室宿) / Zarra (ザラー・エルタイ, Zarā Erutai)
Voiced by: Megumi Ogata (drama CD)
Twelve-year-old Hatsui is the son of healers and finds it difficult to trust in others. He cries a lot and also stutters when he speaks (at least in the Japanese version of the manga). When his parents died, they left him a large debt to pay off. The villagers picked on him until one day, he accidentally killed them with his ability to fire needles from his body. When Takiko found him, he was being "looked after" (or rather, being used to kill off enemies, particularly Takiko and company) by Fen, a female assassin who was hired by Uruki's father to kill the Celestial Warriors and the priestess. Hatsui survived the attack on the Capital and went on to live there, aiding Uruki in his role as Emperor.
Namame (壁宿)
Namame was born from the Seimei Stone (Star-Life Stone) near Iferui. He usually takes the appearance of a little stone doll, although when Takiko first found him, he was a stone giant, protecting the oracle Anru, who was in his mouth. After being traumatized by human cruelty when he attempted to fit in, Namame found it very hard to trust others; it took Anru a whole day of sitting right next to him to earn his trust. He was "protecting" Anru when Takiko and company found him. Namame was the fourth Celestial Warrior found by the Genbu priestess. His character, "Bi", is typically found on the back of his head. Namame has the power to control the earth, which allows him to manipulate the ground itself, create earthquakes, and shape stones into whatever he desires. In the end when Takiko makes her second wish for all living things to return to as they once were, Namame disappears back into the earth, promising to use his abilities to heal the country as he dies.
Hikitsu (斗宿) / Emthatt Chen (エムタト・チェン, Emutato Chen)
Voiced by: Nobuyuki Hiyama (drama CD, game)
Twenty-one-year-old Hikitsu is a member of the Kan tribe. He has a little sister named Ayla and once saved Tomite from being killed by monsters (which also killed Tomite's father) when the two of them were children. He controls water in the form of snakes, but also has another power he called "Shikyokan", where anyone who looks upon the eye with his Seishi mark is forced to remember their worst memories. The latter power doesn't seem to be under control, the eye is usually covered and it has accidentally been used on Takiko. Hikitsu fights alongside Tomite in the final battle and dies shortly after him, having waited for Takiko to complete the summoning of Genbu before departing from the world. Known to fans of the original Fushigi Yûgi, Hikitsu and his friend Tomite became the guardians of the Shinzaho of the Genbu's priestess after their deaths.
Inami (牛宿) / Tarma (タルマ, Taruma)
Voiced by: Masako Katsuki (drama CD)
Inami is a senior prostitute. She is not the owner of the brothel as previously thought, she is just the temporary owner. The original owner of the brothel had discovered that Taruma was a Celestial Warrior and knew of the persecution Inami would faced if found out, so they moved the brothel from Hokkan to Konan for her safety. Inami has the power of controlling her hair to great lengths and can use a pipe as her weapon. She joins Takiko and the other Seishi after great encouragement from the other prostitutes. It is later revealed that she'd gotten pregnant but lost her baby before becoming a prostitute. Inami survives the final battle and goes on to live in the Capital, offering aid to Uruki in his new role as Emperor.
Urumiya (危宿) / Hagus (ハーガス, Hāgasu)
Voiced by: Takehito Koyasu (drama CD)
It is revealed that Hagus is only half of Urumiya (only half of the character is shown), therefore, he is not complete. His elder twin brother, Teg, carried the other half of the character. Though Hagus fights against the Celestial Warriors of Genbu and has the ability to absorb their powers, he is not necessarily evil as he is seen saving children during some of the battles. He has a goal to destroy Uruki, in order for King Temudan to fulfill his promise of reuniting Hagus and Teg. He is under the command of Uruki's father, King Temudan. After leaving Takiko with the newly crowned Emperor Temudan, Hagus reunites with Teg in the underground maze. Sadly, he is impaled by a rock while saving Teg. There he reveals that he had the same illness as Emperor Temudan and was dying anyway. He dies in Teg's arms, making Teg's mark complete and turning him into the complete Urumiya.
Urumiya (危宿) / Teg (テグ, Tegu)
Teg was the braver of the two brothers however his mark appeared first when they were younger. He saved Temudan and Tegiru from monsters while they were out riding just before Temudan fell ill. Once Tegiru was named the next in line in Temudan's place he had Teg imprisoned, promising him reunion with his brother only if he swears fealty to the Rouns. For twelve years, Teg remained in the body of a child. He was able to sense when the other Celestial Warriors used their powers and would sing, effectively cutting off their powers and making them unusable. When Hagus died, Teg grew to an adult and his mark became complete. He joined the Celestial Warriors and fought in the final battle. After the war ended Teg, having survived, went off with Uruki's cousin Princess Efinluka to secure the safety of the people in Hokkan.

== Media ==
=== Manga ===
Fushigi Yûgi: Genbu Kaiden was written and illustrated by Yuu Watase. It was initially serialized in Shōjo Comic Zōkan, a special edition of Shōjo Comic, beginning in March 2003. It moved to Perfect World Fushigi Yûgi, a spin-off of Shōjo Comic, in May 2004 and was serialized quarterly until the magazine's cancellation in June 2008. Watase originally planned to continue the manga in Monthly Flowers. Instead, Genbu Kaiden was placed on hiatus for two years due to Watase's health issues and other work commitments. It eventually resumed serialization in Rinka, a spin-off of Monthly Flowers, on June 14, 2010. When Rinka folded two years later on June 14, 2012, Watase announced that Genbu Kaiden would move to Zōkan Flowers, a new spin-off of Monthly Flowers. The series debuted in Zōkan Flowers' Winter 2012 issue on November 14, 2012, and finally ended in the magazine's Spring 2013 issue on February 14, 2013. The individual chapters of Genbu Kaiden were collected in twelve tankōbon volumes published by Shogakukan under its Flower Comics imprint. The first volume was published in Japan on October 25, 2003; the twelfth and final volume was published in Japan on May 17, 2013.

Genbu Kaiden is licensed for an English-language release in North America by Viz Media. The company's Shojo Beat imprint published all twelve volumes from July 5, 2005, to March 4, 2014. The Viz release was distributed in the United Kingdom by Gollancz Manga beginning in 2005. A second English-language translation was produced in Singapore by Chuang Yi and distributed in Australia and New Zealand by Madman Entertainment. It went out-of-print when Chuang Yi ceased operations in 2014. Genbu Kaiden is also licensed for regional language releases in France by Editions Tonkam, in Spain by Glènat España, in Italy by Planet Manga, and in Germany by EMA.

=== Drama CDs ===
A series of five audio drama CDs based on the manga were produced in Japan by Marine Entertainment. The first was released on January 26, 2005; the second was released on August 24, 2005; the third was released on December 22, 2005; the fourth was released on August 25, 2006; and the fifth and final drama CD was released on July 25, 2007.

=== Video game ===
Idea Factory released the Sony PlayStation 2 video game Fushigi Yûgi: Genbu Kaiden Gaiden – Kagami no Miko (ふしぎ遊戯玄武開伝外伝 鏡の巫女) in Japan on June 23, 2005. The adventure game puts players in the shoes of Mariko Kobayashi, an original character created for the game, who is taken into The Universe of the Four Gods through a mirror. While searching for her friend, Takumi Mochizuki, who was also taken into the mirror, Mariko is aided in her quest by the Priestess of Genbu and the Genbu Seven. A limited edition version of Kagami no Miko was released on the same date, containing an art book and a CD of interviews with the game's voice actors. A PSP version of the game was released in Japan on September 28, 2006. A Nintendo DS version of the game was released in Japan on June 25, 2009, bundled with another Fushigi Yûgi game, Suzaku Ibun.

== Reception ==
=== Critical reception ===
In Manga: The Complete Guide, writer Jason Thompson gave Fushigi Yûgi: Genbu Kaiden three out of five stars. He noted that Watase "clearly enjoys returning to the Fushigi Yûgi world", but he felt that the sequel's "theme of father-child angst" and its "lack of humor ... make for a less welcoming read" than the original series.

=== Sales ===
The eighth volume of Fushigi Yûgi: Genbu Kaiden ranked ninth in the Japanese Comic Ranking, listing the top ten selling manga volumes, for March 25–31, 2008. The ninth volume premiered in sixth place in the September 30 – October 6 rankings.
