= Fushigi Yûgi =

Japanese manga series

- Cover of the first tankōbon volume, featuring Miaka Yuki

ふしぎ遊戯 (Fushigi Yūgi)
- Genre: Fantasy; Isekai; Romance
- Manga
- Written by: Yuu Watase
- Published by: Shogakukan
- English publisher: AUS: Madman Entertainment; NA: Viz Media; SEA: Chuang Yi
- Imprint: Flower Comics
- Magazine: Shōjo Comic
- Original run: December 1991 – May 1996
- Volumes: 18
- Anime television series
- Directed by: Hajime Kamegaki
- Produced by: Keisuke Iwata; Kyotaro Kimura; Ken Hagino
- Written by: Yoshio Urasawa
- Music by: Yusuke Honma
- Studio: Studio Pierrot
- Licensed by: AUS: Madman Entertainment; NA: Media Blasters
- Original network: TXN (TV Tokyo)
- English network: NA: International Channel
- Original run: April 6, 1995 – March 28, 1996
- Episodes: 52
- Original video animation
- Directed by: Hajime Kamegaki
- Produced by: Chizuko Sugeno; Michiyuki Honma; Kouichi Kikuchi
- Written by: Genki Yoshimura
- Music by: Yusuke Honma
- Studio: Pierrot
- Licensed by: AUS: Madman Entertainment; NA: Media Blasters
- Released: October 25, 1996 – August 25, 1998
- Runtime: 25 minutes (each)
- Episodes: 9
- Light novel
- Written by: Megumi Nishizaki
- Illustrated by: Yuu Watase
- Published by: Shogakukan
- Original run: January 30, 1998 – September 26, 2003
- Volumes: 13
- Original video animation

Fushigi Yûgi: Eikoden
- Directed by: Nanako Shimazaki
- Written by: Hiroaki Sato
- Music by: Ryo Sakai
- Studio: Studio Pierrot
- Licensed by: NA: Media Blasters
- Released: December 21, 2001 – June 25, 2002
- Runtime: 30 minutes (each)
- Episodes: 4
- Related works
- Fushigi Yûgi: Genbu Kaiden; Fushigi Yûgi: Byakko Senki

Fushigi Yûgi (Japanese: ふしぎ遊戯; lit. "Mysterious Game"), also known as Fushigi Yûgi: The Mysterious Play or Curious Play, is a Japanese manga series written and illustrated by Yuu Watase. It tells the story of two teenaged girls, Miaka and Yui, who are pulled into The Universe of the Four Gods, a mysterious book at the National Diet Library. It is based on the four mythological creatures of China. Shogakukan serialized Fushigi Yûgi in Shōjo Comic from December 1991 to May 1996 and later compiled the manga into eighteen tankōbon volumes.

Studio Pierrot adapted it into a fifty-two episode anime series that aired from April 1995 to March 1996 on TV Tokyo. The anime spawned three original video animation (OVA) releases, with the first having three episodes, the second having six, and the final OVA, Fushigi Yûgi: Eikoden, spanning four episodes. In North America, Viz Media licensed the manga series for an English-language release in 1999. The anime series was first licensed by Geneon Entertainment and re-licensed by Media Blasters in 2012.

A thirteen-volume Japanese light novel series, written by Megumi Nishizaki, followed Fushigi Yûgi. Shogakukan published the novels from January 1998 to September 2003. Watase also released two prequel manga series: Fushigi Yûgi: Genbu Kaiden, which ran from March 2003 to February 2013, and Fushigi Yûgi: Byakko Senki, which began serialization in August 2017.

As of November 2015, Fushigi Yûgi had over 20 million copies in circulation, making it one of the best-selling manga series of all time.

== Plot ==
The series follows two best friends Miaka Yuki and Yui Hongo, both junior high school students. While visiting the library one day, they encounter a strange book known as The Universe of the Four Gods. The book transports them into the novel's universe set in ancient China, where Miaka finds herself as the Priestess of Suzaku.

Tasked to gather the seven Celestial Warriors of Suzaku and bring peace to the land, Miaka faces various trials on her journey to face her best friend Yui, who has now become her greatest foe, the Priestess of Seiryuu.

== Characters ==
=== Suzaku ===
Suzaku Seven

Miaka Yuki (夕城 美朱, Yūki Miaka)
Voiced by: Kae Araki (Japanese); Bridget Hoffman (English)
The primary protagonist of Fushigi Yûgi, an ordinary 15-year-old junior high school student. Miaka decides to become the Priestess of Suzaku in order to ask Suzaku to grant her wish to join her best friend, Yui, at the same high school. Outgoing and optimistic, Miaka shows herself amiable with friends and strangers, and has a tendency to be guileless and sentimental. She is naïve, but sometimes surprises adults with insightful comments. Miaka is generous, cares greatly for other people, and perceives herself to be a considerate person. She can be unassuming and unsophisticated, but also magnanimous and courageous. Because she creates the impression of a person who always needs help, Miaka has the good fortune of almost always having someone looking after her. Miaka has a primary weakness: her gluttony. She is an avid fan of anime, imitating several characters during the course of the story.
Tamahome (鬼宿)
Voiced by: Hikaru Midorikawa (anime), Mamoru Miyano (game) (Japanese); David Hayter (TV & OVAs), Dave Wittenberg (Eikoden) (English)
He appears to be the strongest member of the Suzaku warriors. An adept martial artist, proficient unarmed and with weapons, Tamahome proves a good street-fighter and can channel his chi into energy-blasts. When emotionally motivated, he is able to use his chi to increase his strength, speed, and reflexes in combat. Tamahome is also experienced in fencing thanks to being trained by Tokaki.
Taka Sukunami (宿南 魏, Sukunami Taka) is the real world reincarnation of Tamahome, and is the same age as he was in The Universe of Four Gods. His family runs a farm in the countryside. In Fushigi Yûgi: Eikoden, he is Miaka's husband and the father of her child, Hikari.
Hotohori (星宿)
Voiced by: Takehito Koyasu (anime), Katsuyuki Konishi (game) (Japanese); Kirk Thornton (English)
The fourth Emperor of Kōnan, is known for his beauty and his narcissism. Known as a responsible ruler and capable of dealing with political affairs, Hotohori often places the well-being of his subjects first and forgets his own needs in the process. He has limited understanding of the world as a result of being raised in a sheltered environment.
Nuriko (柳宿)
Voiced by: Chika Sakamoto (anime), Junko Minagawa (game) (Japanese); Mary Elizabeth McGlynn (English)
He first appears disguised in Emperor Hotohori's harem. He is 18 years old. His true name is Ryuuen Chou (迢 柳娟, Chō Ryūen; Tiáo Liǔjuān). While prone to jealousy, quick to anger, and possessing a calculating tendency, Nuriko is very level-headed and compassionate and shows the most concern regarding Miaka and Tamahome's relationship. As a "woman", Nuriko is infatuated with his fellow warrior, Hotohori, but as a man, he also loves Miaka Yuki.
Chichiri (井宿)
Voiced by: Tomokazu Seki (anime), Kōki Miyata (game) (Japanese); Randy McPherson (English)
He a wandering monk, has trained for several years with Taiitsukun, the creator. As the oldest and wisest of all of the Suzaku warriors, Chichiri thinks of himself as the older brother who looks after them all. Appearing superficially light-hearted, he can put on super deformed "chibi" frivolity or suddenly become very serious and grim. While Tamahome and Hotohori are the obvious leaders, Chichiri is the ever-staunch advisor and supporter from behind the scenes, always willing to help when needed. Unconcerned with his own mortality or with earthly desires, he has a Zen master's detached attitude.
Tasuki (翼宿)
Voiced by: Nobutoshi Canna (anime), Kousuke Toriumi (game) (Japanese); Daran Norris (English)
He formerly led the Mount Reikaku bandits. Extremely quick and agile, he particularly enjoys joking around with Nuriko, Tamahome, and Chichiri.
Mitsukake (軫宿)
Voiced by: Kōji Ishii (anime), Kenta Miyake (game) (Japanese); Richard Epcar (TV Series, OVA 2-3), Michael Gregory (OVA 1) (English)
He is the healer of Suzaku's warriors. He is soft-spoken and one of the most serious of the Suzaku Celestial Warriors. Mitsukake's fighting abilities are limited to his own strength, but as a Celestial Warrior, he possesses incredible healing powers at the cost of exchanging some of his own life force.
Chiriko (張宿)
Voiced by: Tomoko Kawakami (anime), Akiko Kimura (game) (Japanese); Lenore Zann (English)
He is the youngest and the genius among the seven Celestial Warriors of Suzaku.

=== Seiryu ===
Yui Hongo (本郷 唯, Hongō Yui)
Voiced by: Yumi Tōma (Japanese); Wendee Lee (English)
The Priestess of Seiryū (Seiryū no Miko). An intelligent and mature girl, she is a tenth grade student and Miaka Yuki's best friend. A passionate person at heart, she tends to see the world in black and white terms and is easily infuriated with perceived betrayal. Yui is confident and bold with everything she does, but longs for someone to take care of her. Although throughout the course of the story Yui is in love with Tamahome, she ultimately gets together with Tetsuya Kajiwara.
Nakago (心宿)
Voiced by: Tōru Furusawa (anime), Ken Narita (game) (Japanese); Michael Deak (English)
Considered to be the leader of the Seiryū warriors. The main antagonist of Fushigi Yûgi, he is the antihero in the second OVA. Nakago is both merciless and charismatic; he eliminates those whose usefulness to him is exhausted and skillfully manipulates others into doing as he wishes. Nakago's powers as a Celestial Warrior are shown to be stronger than any of the Suzaku and Seiryū warriors, having the ability to manipulate chi, enabling himself to become psychokinetic, fire blasts of energy, and set up force fields. In battle, Nakago also utilizes a whip and sword.
Amiboshi (亢宿)
Voiced by: Yūji Ueda (anime), Tetsuya Kakihara (game) (Japanese); Steve Staley (English)
The elder twin brother of Suboshi. As a Celestial Warrior, Amiboshi is capable of emitting chi through his mouth and channel it through a flute to control the will of others. A skilled flute player, Amiboshi holds the instrument to the left when using his powers, but to the right when he is simply playing the flute. He works as a spy.
Suboshi (角宿)
Voiced by: Yūji Ueda (anime), Tetsuya Kakihara (game) (Japanese); Steve Staley (English)
The younger twin brother of Amiboshi. As a Celestial Warrior, he can use a secret weapon known as the Ryūseisui, a double-meteor bell, and control it with his will alone. He and his brother can communicate with one another by writing messages on their bodies. In terms of temperament, Suboshi is fierce, impulsive, and stubborn to a fault, unwilling to listen to reason once he becomes determined to do something. Suboshi is particularly devoted to his brother and will not hesitate to kill if it means protecting Amiboshi, even killing fellow Seiryū warrior Tomo without a second thought for this reason alone.
Soi (房宿)
Voiced by: Atsuko Tanaka (anime), Yōko Honna (game) (Japanese); Melodee M. Spevack (English)
Was rescued by Nakago when she was a child and is his most devoted follower. As a Celestial Warrior, Soi possesses Feng Shui related powers allowing her to control lightning, induce electromagnetic fields, but is also skilled in Fhangzang and chi raising techniques. She was born in Gen, a province near the Kutō border. Soi normally appears as a formidable armored fighter who speaks like a man, concealing a kind heart and feminine nature.
Ashitare (尾宿)
Voiced by: Ryūzaburō Ōtomo (anime), Kenji Nomura (game) (Japanese); Lenore Zann (English)
A werewolf from Hokkan who Nakago found in a circus tent; until then, Ashitare apparently was a circus side-show. Hardened and angry, he developed a hatred of humans and would devour human flesh after killing them. Because of Ashitare's brute strength, he is seemingly unstoppable.
Tomo (氐宿)
Voiced by: Nobuo Tobita (anime), Yūichi Nakamura (game) (Japanese); Kevin Seymour (English)
An illusionist and performer among the Celestial Warriors of Seiryū. Having faced hardship since childhood, Tomo is sadistic and cruel, possessing a contorted mentality and severe attitude toward others. His abilities as a Celestial Warrior allow him to hypnotize opponents.
Miboshi (箕宿)
Voiced by: Midori Nakazawa (Japanese); Barbara Goodson (English)
The last of the Seiryū Celestial Warriors to appear. While he looks like a young boy, he is actually much older than the other Seiryū warriors. As a Celestial Warrior he can possess others, as well as summoning and controlling demons. He employs a Tibetan prayer-wheel with sutras inscribed on it to summon monsters and to perform sorcery.

=== Genbu ===
Takiko Okuda (奧田 多喜子, Okuda Takiko)
Voiced by: Satsuki Yukino (drama CD/game)
The Priestess of Genbu and the heroine of Fushigi Yûgi: Genbu Kaiden. The daughter of Einosuke Okuda, the Japanese translator of the original scripture for The Universe of the Four Gods, Takiko is a serious young girl skilled with the naginata. She demonstrates a strong will and good heart, but shows insecurity with her own abilities and tends to be impulsive. Takiko is sincere, honest, and possesses a strong sense of justice.
Uruki (女宿)
Voiced by: Takahiro Sakurai (male form), Miki Nagasawa (female form) (drama CD/game)
The crown prince of the Hokkan Empire and second in line to the throne. He wields a bladed discus to fight, and as a Celestial Warrior he is able to manipulate the wind in various ways, particularly for teleportation. The only setback to this power is that he must transform into a woman in order to utilize it.
Tomite (虚宿)
Voiced by: Tetsuya Iwanaga (Japanese); Michael Lindsay (English)
A Genbu Celestial Warrior and a bounty hunter from the Ka Tribe, an ethnic minority in western Hokkan. In addition to being a skilled archer, Tomite, as a Celestial Warrior, is capable of manifesting and manipulating ice.
Hatsui (室宿)
Voiced by: Megumi Ogata (drama CD)
A Genbu Celestial Warrior and the son of medical doctors. He possesses the ability to shoot spikes from his body and the ability to form a steel cage/basket around himself and others as a means of protection. He is timid, shy, and cries easily and finds it difficult to trust others.
Namame (壁宿)
A Genbu Celestial Warrior who appears as a small doll made of rock that resembles the kodama. Though he is apparently unable to speak, Takiko eventually is able to hear his voice and Namame speaks in simple and short sentences.
Hikitsu (斗宿)
Voiced by: Nobuyuki Hiyama (Japanese); Skip Stellrecht (English)
A Genbu Celestial Warrior, able to manipulate water in the form of snakes, but also possesses a second ability which he has no control over: Shikyokan, where anyone who looks upon the eye with his character is forced to remember their worst memories. Hikitsu is withdrawn and cold to everyone apart from his sister Ayla and his best friend Tomite, whom Hikitsu had saved during an attack which caused the death of Tomite's father.
Inami (牛宿)
Voiced by: Masako Katsuki (drama CD)
A Genbu Celestial Warrior, initially found in the country of Konan working as a brothel madam. She fights using a large pipe shaped weapon and possesses the ability to manipulate the length of her hair and the smoke from her oversized pipe.
Urumiya (危宿)
Voiced by: Takehito Koyasu (drama CD)
The last of the Genbu Celestial Warriors to be unveiled. A dangerous and skilled assassin, Hagus always carries a wide bladed sword and is a proficient archer. He is able to absorb the powers of other Celestial Warriors though his mouth and then use them as he pleases. Hagus comes across as a coldhearted and merciless man whose only desire is to succeed in his mission to kill Uruki. He is unemotional and able to remain calm and focused, even in the heat of battle, but demonstrates an unexpectedly compassionate side to him when he saves two children from misaimed arrows. When he is not battling Uruki and Takiko, he comes across as morose and quiet.

=== Byakko ===
Suzuno Ohsugi (大杉 鈴乃, Ōsugi Suzuno)
Voiced by: Midori Nakazawa
The Priestess of Byakko. She is the daughter of Takao Ohsugi, the research assistant of Einosuke Okuda, translator of The Universe of Four Gods and the long time crush of Einosuke's daughter, Takiko, the Priestess of Genbu.
Tatara (婁宿)
Voiced by: Jin Yamanoi
A Byakko Celestial Warrior. Though he is 110 years old, he only appears 20 years old as a result of a spell cast by Subaru and from residing in the Temple of Byakko since Suzuno's departure from The Universe of Four Gods. He possesses the ability to control all plants, regardless of their form.
Tokaki (奎宿)
Voiced by: Kōji Ishii (Japanese); Tom Wyner (English) (Old)
Voiced by: Katsuya Shiga (Japanese); Bob Buchholz (English) (Young)
Married to the beautiful and kind Subaru. Extremely lecherous in nature, Tokaki takes it upon himself to comment on any attractive young woman he comes across, including Miaka. Despite his womanizing habits, Tokaki loves Subaru dearly and would go to any length to protect her. He cares deeply for Tatara and Tamahome, whom he sees as a son. He is 109 years old, but only appears 19 years old. Tokaki's power is teleportation and is supplemented by his knowledge of pressure points as well as his use of earrings as weapons.
Subaru (昴宿)
Voiced by: Mika Doi (Japanese); Barbara Goodson (English)
Married to the lecherous Tokaki. She possesses the ability to manipulate time through spells and is actually 107 years old, though she appears only 17. Sweet and nurturing, Subaru tends to the exhausted Suzaku Warriors who descend upon her home. Though she is often exasperated by Tokaki's roving eye, she does love her husband.

=== Others ===
Keisuke Yuki
Voiced by: Shinichiro Miki (Japanese); Derek Stephen Prince (English)
The older brother of Miaka Yuki. He is a very caring and protective older brother. He is portrayed as a typical college student. Keisuke is close friends with Tetsuya Kajiwara. He initially doesn't believe Miaka about the Universe of the Four Gods until he witnesses Miaka getting sucked into the book. Keisuke eventually starts reading the book in order for the story to continue. Later on in the story, Keisuke starts investigating the Universe of the Four Gods along with Tetsuya.
Tetsuya Kajiwara
Voiced by: Ken Narita (Japanese); Kirk Baily (English)
A calm, level-headed, and selfless college student and friend. He is usually seen with shades on, and is close friends with Keisuke Yuki. Tetsuya takes turns with Keisuke in reading the Universe of the Four Gods. During the times Miaka is in danger in the book, Tetsuya takes over reading in order for it to be easier for Keisuke. Tetsuya also helps Keisuke in his investigation of the Universe of the Four Gods. Tetsuya falls in love with Yui Hongo while reading the book and eventually gets together with her.

== Media ==
=== Manga ===
Written and illustrated by Yuu Watase, Fushigi Yûgi originally appeared in serial form in the semimonthly manga magazine Shōjo Comic. It premiered in the January 1, 1992 (No. 1) issue, released in December 1991, (Note: To celebrate the 50th anniversary of Shōjo Comic, Japanese news website Comic Natalie documented the magazine's serializations from 1968 to 2018. Comic Natalie listed Fushigi Yûgi beginning in 1991 and included a scan of its debut on the cover of the January 1, 1992 (No. 1) issue. Magazines are often published in advance of their cover dates; January issues may be published in the previous year.) and ran for over five years, ending in the June 5, 1996 (No. 12) issue, released in May 1996. The series was simultaneously published in eighteen collected volumes by Shogakukan, with new volumes being released on a quarterly schedule.

In 1992, Viz Media licensed the manga for an English-language release in North America. The series was originally released in a flipped trade paperback format, starting in August 1998. Several characters have both Japanese pronunciations and Chinese pronunciations. In 1998, Watase visited the United States and met with Viz staff members at their San Francisco headquarters. Viz kept the original Chinese names of characters at her request. Bill Flanagan, the editor of the English version, asked Watase if he should use the Chinese names for popular characters such as Tai Yi-Jun (Taitsukun), and she also asked for the Chinese names to be used there. The characters with names remaining in Japanese in the English version are the characters such as Tamahome who have Japanese pronunciations of ancient constellations; there was never any intention of them having Chinese names.

This caused some confusion for fans as the anime version uses the Japanese names. For example, in the manga, Hotohori's country is named "Hong-Nan" rather than the "Konan" found in the anime series. After eight volumes, Viz stopped publication of Fushigi Yûgi, reviving it in June 2003 when it released the first two volumes in unflipped standard manga size volumes. The remaining volumes were released on a quarterly schedule, including the remaining ten volumes. The final volume of the series was released in April 2006. The dates and ISBN numbers given for the first eight volumes in the table on the link above are for the second edition releases.

Viz also serialized Fushigi Yûgi in their manga anthology magazine, Animerica Extra, starting with the October 1998 debut issue and running until the December 2004 issue, the magazine's final issue. In 2009 and 2010, Viz re-released the series as part of their "VIZBIG" line, combining three individual volumes of the original release into each single, larger volume.

=== Anime ===
Produced by Studio Pierrot, the fifty-two episode Fushigi Yûgi anime series premiered on TV Tokyo on April 6, 1995. The series aired weekly, until the final episode that was aired on March 28, 1996. The series was licensed for English-language release to Region 1 DVD and VHS format by Geneon Entertainment, then named Pioneer, under the expanded title Fushigi Yûgi: The Mysterious Play. It has been suggested that Geneon chose to license the series based on its popularity among the fansub community. The main series was released in eight individual volumes and as two box sets, the Suzaku and Seiryū sets. Media Blasters license-rescued the series, and released the first season to DVD on June 19, 2012. Season 2 was released on February 12, 2013.

=== Original video animations ===
Following the anime adaptation, three original video animation (OVA) works appeared. The first, spanning three episodes, takes place a year after the events of the main series and has no ties to the original manga. It was released to DVD on October 25, 1996. The second OVA, which has six episodes, animates the last four volumes of the manga series that had been left out of the main series. The episodes were split across two volumes, with the first released May 25, 1997, and the second coming over a year later on August 25, 1998.

The final OVA, Fushigi Yûgi: Eikoden, spans four episodes and is based on two of the light novels written by Megumi Nishizaki. Released on December 21, 2001, it focuses on a new character, Mayo Sakaki, a sixteen-year-old girl who attends Yotsubadai High School. Upon finding The Universe of the Four Gods in a trash bin at the park, Mayo soon discovers that the story remains incomplete. In the unfamiliar world of the book, Mayo must come to terms with her own life and the unhappiness within it.

Geneon Entertainment also licensed the OVAs for Region 1 DVD release. The first two OVAs were released together in a set titled Fushigi Yûgi: The Mysterious Play, while Fushigi Yûgi: Eikoden was released as a single disc volume. The OVAs were released with similar packaging as the main series, to give them a consistent look. All three OVA series have also been re-licensed by Media Blasters.

=== Novels ===
Over a series of five years, Megumi Nishizaki (西崎めぐみ, Nishizaki Megumi) wrote thirteen Japanese light novels based on Fushigi Yûgi. Illustrated by Yuu Watase, Fushigi Yûgi Gaiden primarily explores the lives the various Celestial Warriors before they are seen in the manga. The only two novels to be set after the manga, Eikō Den (Jōkan) and Eikō Den (Gekan), later became the basis for the third Fushigi Yûgi original video animation, Fushigi Yûgi: Eikoden. Originally published by Shogakukan, none of the novels have been licensed for English release.

Volume	Title	Release Date	ISBN
1	Transliteration: "Genrō Den" (Japanese: 幻狼伝)	January 30, 1998	978-4094207736
Details Tasuki's life between joining the Mt. Reikaku Bandits and Miaka's appearance.
2	Transliteration: "Shōryū Den" (Japanese: 昇龍伝)	July 23, 1998	978-4094207743
Chichiri's life shortly after the accident when he loses his eye to his first meeting with Miaka.
3	Transliteration: "Yuki Yasha Den" (Japanese: 雪夜叉伝)	February 2, 1999	978-4094207750
Details how Nuriko became a cross-dresser and entered the imperial harem.
4	Transliteration: "Ryūsei Den" (Japanese: 流星伝)	April 23, 1999	978-4094207767
Details Amiboshi and Suboshi's tragic past.
5	Transliteration: "Suzaku Hi Den" (Japanese: 朱雀悲伝)	July 1999	978-4094207774
The story of emperor Hotohori, his brother Tendō and their relationship with Hōki. This story is later told by Hōki herself to Mayo Sakaki in the Eikoden OVA.
6	Transliteration: "Seiran Den" (Japanese: 青藍伝)	December 1, 1999	978-4094207781
Details Nakago's past and his rise to power within the Kutō army.
7	Transliteration: "Eikō Den (Jōkan)" (Japanese: 永光伝(上巻))	February 1, 2000	978-4094207798
Set ten years after the final events in the manga, Mayo enters The Universe of the Four Gods. Unhappy with her own life, Mayo wants to achieve a storybook ending with Taka, whom she has a crush on.
8	Transliteration: "Eikō Den (Gekan)" (Japanese: 永光伝(下巻))	March 1, 2000	978-4094207804
Continues Mayo's story as she is tricked by a false Suzaku, and saved by Miaka.
9	Transliteration: "Shugyoku Den" (Japanese: 朱玉伝)	December 21, 2001	978-4094207897
Tamahome's life from his training under Tokaki to when he first meets Miaka and Yui. This novel also tells Miaka's backstory and her connection with Tamahome during the years of the manifestation of his powers.
10	Transliteration: "Hōmei Den" (Japanese: 逢命伝)	March 1, 2002	978-4094207903
Details Mitsukake's romance with Shōka.
11	Transliteration: "Yūai Den" (Japanese: 優愛伝)	April 26, 2002	978-4094208214
Recounts Chiriko's whereabouts before he joined the rest of the Suzaku Warriors.
12	Transliteration: "Sanbō Den (Jōkan)" (Japanese: 三宝伝(上巻))	July 1, 2003	978-4094208221
Explains how Tenkō used his powers to influence people to do his bidding to break the seal the Four Beast Gods placed on him, as well as to gather the Shinzaho of Genbu, Byakko, Seiryuu and Suzaku. The two main characters are Chichiri and Tasuki.
13	Transliteration: "Sanbō Den 2 (Gekan)" (Japanese: 三宝伝(下巻))	September 26, 2003	978-4094208238
Continues story from part 1.

=== Video game ===
Idea Factory created a Sony PlayStation 2 video game based on the Fushigi Yûgi series called Fushigi Yûgi: Suzaku Ibun (ふしぎ遊戯 朱雀異聞). It was released in Japan on May 29, 2008, in both regular and limited editions. A Nintendo DS version of the game was released in Japan on June 25, 2009, bundled with another game, Fushigi Yûgi: Genbu Kaiden Gaiden – Kagami no Miko, based on the prequel manga series Fushigi Yûgi: Genbu Kaiden.

=== Stage plays ===
Amipro produced three stage plays based on the Fushigi Yûgi manga. The first, simply titled Fushigi Yûgi, was staged at The Pocket theater in Nakano from October 20 to October 24, 2010. The second, Fushigi Yûgi: Suzaku-hen (ふしぎ遊戯～朱雀編～), was staged at the Theater Sun Mall in Shinjuku from March 30 to April 3, 2011. The third, Fushigi Yûgi: Seiryū-hen (ふしぎ遊戯～青龍編～), was staged at the Hakuhinkan Theater in Ginza from April 25 to May 2, 2012. All three plays were written and directed by Shintarō Sugano and starred Mao Miyaji in the lead role.

A fourth play, produced by Nelke Planning, was staged at the Shinagawa Prince Hotel Club eX venue in Tokyo from March 19 to March 29, 2015. It was written by Keiko Ueno, directed by Naoyoshi Okumura, and starred Golden Bomber band member Yutaka Kyan in the lead role of Tamahome. The play aimed to depict a "new version of Fushigi Yûgi through the eyes of Tamahome".

A live-action 2.5D musical stage adaptation, Fushigi Yûgi: Ake no Shō (ふしぎ遊戯～朱ノ章～), ran at the Owlspot Theater in Tokyo from April 8 to April 17, 2016. It was produced by Amipro and written and directed by Kōtarō Yoshitani. The cast featured former Morning Musume member Reina Tanaka as Miaka, Ryō Hirano as Tamahome, Juri Aikawa as Nakago, Takahisa Maeyama as Hotohori, Mao Miyaji as Nuriko, Yoshikazu Kotani as Tasuki, Eiji Takigawa as Mitsukake, Tatsumaru Tachibana as Chichiri, Tsubasa Hattori as Amiboshi, Daiki Tomida as Chiriko, Mina Kuryū as Shouka, Zendō Ware as Eiken, Shiori Sakata as Yui, and Jun Fujimiya as Taiitsukun.

A sequel, Fushigi Yûgi: Ao no Shō (ふしぎ遊戯～蒼ノ章～), ran at Zenrosai Hall Space Zero in Tokyo from October 13 to October 21, 2018. It was also produced by Amipro, but written and directed by Sayaka Asai. Several cast members from the 2016 musical returned to reprise their roles, including Reina Tanaka as Miaka and Ryō Hirano as Tamahome. New cast members included Rina Miyazaki as Yui, Yoshiki Tani as Hotohori, Ken Ogasawara as Mitsukake, Subaru Hayama as Chichiri, and Kunta Yamasaki as Tasuki.

=== Other media ===
An art book, Fushigi Yūgi: Watase Yū Irasuto-shū (不思議遊戯：渡瀬悠宇イラスト集), was published by Shogakukan in May 1995. It was licensed in North America by Viz Media under the title The Art of Fushigi Yûgi and published in October 2006.

== Reception ==
=== Manga ===
As of November 2015, Fushigi Yûgi had over 20 million copies in circulation.

In a column for Anime News Network, writer Jason Thompson called Fushigi Yûgi a "great mix of monsters, magic, fighting and the more typical Shōjo Comic material, romance". In his expanded review of the series for Manga: The Complete Guide, Thompson further praised it as "one of the best 'schoolgirl in a strange land' shōjo fantasies". He singled out Watase's writing, which he believes "successfully balances" romance, action, comedy, and cliffhangers, as well as the series' compact supporting cast full of "strong personalities".

=== Anime ===
THEM Anime Reviews preferred the manga to the anime, criticizing the latter's production values, repetitious dialogue, and reuse of footage in flashback episodes. DVD Verdict criticized the "convoluted" plot and "nonsensical" dialogue. Another review noted that although Miaka "makes out with her boyfriend quite a bit", the climax is "of the heart and soul", despite the many battles that the characters go through. Her strength and belief in herself give her the strength and courage to change the world. Patrick Drazen, author of Anime Explosion!, considers the humor in Fushigi Yûgi to be based on super deformed caricatures and therefore strange to Western audiences. Anime News Network argued that the show is "always entertaining throughout", while CBR criticized that Nakago is a pretty character even when "committing horrendous crimes like mass murder and sexual assault".

Winnie Chow of Animerica was disappointed by the ending of the anime adaptation, finding the final battle that resolves the series to be "lame at best" that left her cheering more for Nakago than the "good guys". Throughout the series, she notes that the scenes between Miaka and Tamahome became "increasingly sickening" and "overdone". Fushigi Yûgi: Eikoden was panned by THEM Anime Reviews, which considered the animation to be its only strong point. In particular, the reviewer found the new main character to be unlikeable.

== See also ==
- Ao no Fūin, a manga series based on the same legends
