= Ceres, Celestial Legend =

Japanese manga series by Yuu Watase

- First tankōbon volume cover

妖しのセレス (Ayashi no Seresu)
- Genre: Drama; Supernatural
- Manga
- Written by: Yuu Watase
- Published by: Shogakukan
- English publisher: US: Viz Media
- Magazine: Shōjo Comic
- Original run: May 1996 – March 2000
- Volumes: 14
- Anime television series
- Directed by: Hajime Kamegaki
- Produced by: Akito Yamashita; Shigeru Watanabe; Yuji Nunokawa
- Written by: Yukiyoshi Ōhashi
- Music by: Ryō Sakai
- Studio: Pierrot
- Licensed by: NA: Discotek Media
- Original network: Wowow
- Original run: April 20, 2000 – September 28, 2000
- Episodes: 24

Ceres, Celestial Legend, known in Japan as Ayashi no Seresu (妖しのセレス), is a Japanese manga series written and illustrated by Yuu Watase. It was originally serialized in Shōgakukan's magazine Shōjo Comic from May 1996 to March 2000, with its chapters collected in 14 tankōbon volumes. The manga was licensed for English release in North America by Viz Media. The series follows a high school girl, who learns on her sixteenth birthday that she is the reincarnation of an ancient and supremely powerful celestial maiden or angel (tennyo) named Ceres, and her twin brother Aki the reincarnation of Ceres' former husband, Mikagi, is the progenitor of the Mikage family, who had stolen Ceres' robe. Ceres' spirit begins manifesting in Aya, and to save her brother she must find Ceres' long-lost celestial robe, while fighting against her family members who want to use Ceres's supreme celestial abilities for their own personal gain.

Pierrot adapted the series into a 24-episode anime television series, broadcast on Wowow from April to September 2000. The anime series was also licensed by Viz, but has since been re-licensed by Discotek Media.

In 1998, Ceres, Celestial Legend won the 43rd Shogakukan Manga Award in the shōjo category.

== Plot ==
High school siblings Aya Mikage and her older twin brother, Aki, are forced to go to their grandfather's home for their sixteenth birthday, unaware that it is actually a test to see if they have angel or celestial maiden blood possess within them. Aya learns she is one of many reincarnations of a vengeful and supremely powerful celestial maiden named Ceres who takes over her mind and body only when under intense stress or fury. When she transforms into Ceres, Aya obtains supernatural abilities of flight, teleportation, telepathy, powerful telekinesis, premonition, and superhuman speed. She can also project destructive pink energy blasts from her hands, and create impenetrable shields of bright pink-colored celestial energy. According to legend, Ceres will ultimately exterminate the entire Mikage family in retaliation for stealing her hagoromo (celestial robe), thus preventing her returning home to Heaven. Because of this, Aya's paternal grandfather and his clan attempt to kill her, but she is saved by Suzumi Aogiri, another descendant of a heavenly maiden with incredibly strong celestial and mental abilities of her own, and Suzumi's teenage brother-in-law, Yūhi. Aya struggles to control Ceres' influence over her and appease her spirit once and for all. Her brother Aki is eventually completely taken over by the vengeful spirit of "Shiso Mikagi", the original ancestor/progenitor of the entire Mikage family and Ceres's former lover who stole Ceres' celestial robe (or "mana"), forcing her to stay with him on Earth. Aya promises Ceres that she will help her find the celestial robe in exchange for not killing those who hunt her, especially Aki, since Aya still loves them as family. It is revealed (in Episode 7, "Celestial Awakening") that "The Hagoromo Legend" exists in not just Japan, but also in Europe, Africa, all three regions of Oceania, Germany, China, Korea, Russia, and even the United States.

Toya, a former servant of the Mikage family and with no recollection of his past for whom Aya has strong romantic feelings is also trying to kill her as well. However, the two eventually begins to have romantic feelings for each other and they conceive a child together. Toya regains his memory and learns that he is an immortal humanoid organism, also known as the "manna", that the celestial robe created to help itself reunite with Ceres and enable her to reach her full evolution as a celestial maiden. In the end, Aki, having resisted Mikagi's spirit, sacrifices himself to save Aya, and Toya sacrifices his own manna and immortality to save Aya and their unborn child. Months later, Aya and Toya await the birth of their child, knowing that Toya will have to live the remainder of his life as a mortal, although Toya reveals that he will live longer, for his new family's sake.

== Characters ==
Aya Mikage (御景 妖, Mikage Aya)
Voiced by: Yumi Kakazu (Japanese); Mariette Sluyter (English)
A sixteen-year-old high school girl. She is a direct descendant and reincarnation of a Tennin named Ceres, who uses her as a medium for existence. The Mikage family considers Ceres a threat and continuously tries to take Aya's life. Aya is horrified but determined to right the past wrongs of her family and recover Ceres' hagoromo so that her family will no longer suffer in fear of her. She falls in love with Toya, and they conceive a child together. In the sequel Episode of Miku, Aya gives birth to a girl named Miku and, three years later, a boy named Aki-(Miku's younger brother), who is the look-alike reincarnation of her late twin brother. She initially has long blonde hair, light blue eyes and wears a small pair of red earrings that she had given to her brother. During her depression and her confrontation with Miori, her long hair is cut short but later grows into shoulder-length until the end of the anime; her last name-(Mikage) stands for "honorable shadow".
Ceres (セレス, Seresu)
Voiced by: Junko Iwao (Japanese); Onalea Gilbertson (English)
A powerful Tennyo (celestial maiden or "angel") from myth who had hesitantly married Mikagi, the founder of the Mikage family. While she is supremely powerful and volatile, she needs her hagoromo (celestial robe) to recover her true form and full abilities. She has repeatedly attempted to manifest herself through certain female descendants of her bloodline when they reach the age of sixteen. Because her tragic past was misinterpreted by her descendants, her female reincarnations are relentlessly killed by the Mikage family.
Toya (十夜, Tōya)
Voiced by: Katsuyuki Konishi (Japanese); Victor Atelevich (English)
Aya's main love interest in the series. He is a mysterious young man who has absolutely no memory of his past or his true nature; his only clues are two names: "Toya" ("ten nights", his name), and "Mikage"-(which according to episode 8 means "honorable shadow"). He originally works for Mikage International until he fell in love with Aya, rebelling against them to protect her. It is later revealed that he met Aya when she was a six-year-old child. Toya is the embodiment/offspring of the hagoromo of Ceres. He sacrifices the manna bestowed upon him by the celestial robe to give him immortality, saving Aya and protecting their two young children, Miku and Aki. He has pale white skin, brownish red hair, green eyes and is often seen wearing clip-on earrings on both his ears. His fighting outfit is a long forest green coat with a navy blue crop top, along with matching pants and black monk strap shoes; his weapon of choice is a gold and silver Victorian styled dagger capable of shooting out a power red beam that can destroy anything in his path, and a small MP5K machine gun. Towards in the end of the anime after being revived by the celestial robe and protecting Aya from Mikagi, Toya wears the same button shirt and jeans when he meets Aya as a child but is black and gray.
Aki Mikage (御景 明, Mikage Aki)
Voiced by: Susumu Chiba (Japanese); Tommy Campbell (English)
Aya's twin brother. He is a gentle and caring person who becomes a medium for the spirit of Mikagi, the founder of the Mikage family. Mikagi in Aki's body aggressively pursues Aya and Ceres, and almost rapes Aya. In the end Aki sacrifices his life to destroy the violent and hateful spirit. In the sequel Episode of Miku, he is reborn as Aya and Toya's second child Aki, and Miku's younger brother. The uniform at his and Aya's previous school-(Sarashina High School) was a white polo shirt with an aqua marine vest and a grey skirt/pants.
Suzumi Aogiri (梧 納涼, Aogiri Suzumi)
Voiced by: Mayumi Asano (Japanese); Maizun Jayoussi (English)
A widow and a C-Genomer (Tennin descendant) from the Kansai region, Suzumi is the head of a branch of one of the Aogiri family's schools of Japanese dance. She welcomes Aya into her household when she discovers Aya has become Ceres' latest medium. Suzumi cannot become a Tennin like Aya, though she does possess some psychic/psionic abilities, such as clairvoyance, premonition, and powerful telekinesis. She is capable of making protective celestial amulets that possess enormous power.
Yūhi Aogiri (梧 雄飛, Aogiri Yūhi)
Voiced by: Kentarō Itō (Japanese); Matthew Erickson (English)
The adopted younger brother of Suzumi's deceased husband Kazuma. Early in the series, he wears a red colored headband enhanced with strong Tennin magic made by Suzumi, designating him Aya's bodyguard. He has a strong unrequited love for Aya. Though attracted to Yūhi, Aya ultimately comes to see him as a close friend on a strictly platonic level, and Yūhi is able to accept the fact that Aya only loves Toya. Later, he begins to care deeply for Chidori Kuruma. A notable martial arts expert, he is also an extraordinary cook which had learned from his mother. His two main outfits are a grey and yellow gakuran school uniform, and a grayish blue judogi, his main weapon is a pair of silver combat chopsticks.
Kyū Oda, "Mrs. Q" (小田 玖, Oda Kyū)
Voiced by: Kujira (Japanese); Doug McKeag (English)
The Aogiri's household help, "Mrs. Q" is a gnome-like woman known for her reckless driving and ridiculously ugly appearance, despite her consistent claims that she is a beautiful woman. She's convinced that she and Toya are made for each other.
Chidori Kuruma (来間 千鳥, Kuruma Chidori)
Voiced by: Ayako Kawasumi (Japanese); Carol-Anne Day (English)
A C-Genomer from Tochigi Prefecture, Chidori is a cheerful high school girl who looks and acts childlike until she transforms into a Tennin. She cares very deeply for her younger brother, Shota, who was hospitalized upon her introduction into the story. She can transform into a Tennin at will or whenever she gets mad or upset. She seems to have developed deep romantic feelings for her crush Yūhi, and later dies for his sake just as she is about to confess that she had always cared for him. The Mikage scientists identify Chidori's Tennin type as Pallas. She has wavy salmon pink hair that is often worn in two pigtails; her school uniform is a periwinkle colored blazer with a red tie, a navy blue skirt, and wears black socks with brown shoes.
Yuki Urakawa (浦川 由貴, Urakawa Yuki)
Voiced by: Akiko Kimura
A high school girl and a C-Genomer who goes the same school as Yūhi and Aya. She is quiet and has a weak constitution, so she can't transform into a Tennin, but she can manifest pyrokinesis. She has a relationship with her teacher Mr. Hayama, who is actually an agent sent by Mikage International to capture and eliminate Aya and Ceres. In the end, Urakawa burns the agent with her powers and hugs him, causing the fire to kill her as well. She wears a sailor styled school uniform that is red and yellow, complete with a grey bow tie, white socks and black shoes.
Miori Sahara (佐原 美緒里, Sahara Miori)
Voiced by: Akiko Yajima (Japanese); Meredith Taylor-Parry (English)
Aya's distant cousin and a C-Genomer from Shizuoka Prefecture. She was Toya's lover in a fake past that Kagami implanted in him who was mostly known as Toya Mizuki (水木 十夜, Mizuki Toya). She is an ordinary high school student of the co-ed Kaisei High School living a normal, happy life with her mother, until her mother was summoned by the Mikages and killed at the main house when Aya first transformed into Ceres. She pretends to be a friend of Aya when she transfers to her school, and transforms into a Tennin to take on Aya (as Ceres) and avenge her mother's death. She later kills herself in front of a huge crowd, to make a final act of "revenge" against Aya. Miori is identified by the Mikage scientists as possessing the same Tennin type as Aya. Her school uniform has a silver colored blazer with a black skirt, and a red ribbon.
Shuro Tsukasa (司 珠呂, Tsukasa Shuro)
Voiced by: Shizuka Sasaki (Japanese); Elizabeth Stepkowski (English)
An Okinawan C-Genomer, Shuro was raised as a man by her family out of a fear that she would one day take away the family's heirloom, Ceres' hagoromo, and ascend to heaven. She is GeSANG's famous pop star alongside her cousin Kei Tsukasa, who she is in love with. She dies near the end of the series during her "farewell" concert while attempting to free the C-Genomes. Shuro has the ability to magnify her voice to an amplitude that can rupture a person's heart when she transforms into a Tennin. Mikage scientists identify her as Tennin type Juno.
Kagami Mikage (御景 各臣, Mikage Kagami)
Voiced by: Tomokazu Sugita (Japanese); Dave Kelly (English)
Aya's distant cousin and director of the C-Project (Celestial Project) conducted by Mikage International. He is one of the few members of the Mikage family who wants to meet Ceres and does not fear her. At times he seems in love with her. Kagami wants to capture Ceres and study her, to harness the ability of the Tennin and learn their true nature. He aims to better humanity by creating a perfect human race, though his methods are less than moral. His personality developed from a tragic childhood, where his mother beat him for not being the best at things-(such as getting good grades in school) until he was taken out of his mother's custody after she was sent to a mental institution for her abusive and perfectionist ways. He wears glasses, has dark grey hair, and wears a dark blue blazer, with a turquoise shirt and yellow tie underneath. Near the end of the series, it's revealed that he's engaged to a fiancée, but was forced to put their wedding on hold due to his work with the Mikage.
Alec (アレク, Areku) / Alexander O. Howell (アレクサンダー·O·ハウエル, Arekusandā O. Haueru)
Voiced by: Tomokazu Seki (Japanese); Jonathan Love (English)
A Scottish scientist who studied in the U.S. and speaks Japanese with a thick accent. He is a certified genius with a very high IQ and a complete otaku. He works for Mikage International and provides advanced technology for the development of C-Project. As the project progresses, Alec finds that the situation is not what he expected, and tries to back out because of his own moral convictions. He has yellow colored hair with his bangs parted to the side, a pair of spectacles over his nose, and wears a red shirt with blue jeans and a lab coat.
Gladys Smithson (グラディス·スミソン, Guradisu Sumison)
Voiced by: Yūko Nagashima (Japanese); Maureen Jones (English)
An American colleague of Alec who also works for the C-Project at Mikage International. She is responsible for the C-Genomer's power growth and development. She dies after putting herself between Mikagi and a pregnant Ceres. She has white hair that is worn in a bun and wears a magenta colored blazer with an orange dress underneath.
Wei Fei Li (偉 飛麗, Wěi Fēi-lì)
Voiced by: Kōichi Tōchika (Japanese); Ethan Cole (English)
A young, skilled martial artist from China hired by Mikage International. Wielding a vicious chain whip and various tiny throwing blades, he is often sent out to capture C-Genomers or perform other covert tasks. When Toya tries to leave the headquarters together with Aki, Wei is sent stop them, and Toya takes out his left eye and wear a white bandage to cover it up. Wei is Aki and Shiso's caretaker and bodyguard, and Toya's replacement. He seems to be calm most of the time and does not complain, but he harbors a grudge against Toya for his injury. He has dark green hair, brown skin, and grey eyes. His fighting outfit consists of a light purple Chinese styled coat with blue high heeled boots.
Shiso Mikagi (始祖·ミカギ, Shiso Mikagi)
Voiced by: Shin-ichiro Miki (Japanese); Jonathan Love (English)
The founder of the Mikage family, Mikagi, first lived during the Jōmon period of Japan. He began as a gentle, kind young man. Ceres falls in love with him, and when their family is attacked and he is ashamed of his inability to protect them, she grants him power. His growing strength drives him mad, and his love becomes an obsession that drives him to hide the hagoromo, causing Ceres to fear for her children's safety. When she leaves, he chases her and kills their first child, so Ceres kills him, covering his body with lacerations that remain when he manifests in Aki. He will stop at nothing to make Ceres his again.
Assam
A young assassin from Indonesia hired by Kagami to replace and kill Toya. He wants the C-Project to stop using children as objects of war.
Shouta Kuruma (来間 笑太, Kuruma Shouta)
- Voiced by: Kae Araki (Japanese); Mariette Sluyter (English)
An elementary school-aged boy and Chidori's younger brother. After surviving a bus accident that too the lives of his parents two years ago, he was (temporarily) paralyzed from the waist down causing him to use a wheelchair for mobility. When he met Toya at the hospital he was staying at, he began to see him as a close friend; he stood up for the first time in episode 11 and he can also be seen walking in episodes 19 and 20, he has peach colored skin, hazel eyes, and chestnut brown hair. His dream career is to become a pilot and enjoys looking at the sky.
Miku Mikage (御景 ミク, Mikage Miku)
Aya and Toya's daughter who turns 3 year old in Episode of Miku. Because of her young age, she has a tendency to mispronounce words even ones that are simple; on the manga covers she has red hair just like her father Toya, but in a bob cut. She is the older sister of Aki, a younger reincarnated version of Aya's brother; it is hinted that Miku is the key to ending the Ceres virus. Her name means "future".
Sonoko Mikage (御影 ソノコ, Mikage Sonoko)
- Voiced by: Unknown (Japanese); Michelle Armeneau (English)
Aya and Aki's mother. After witnessing her daughter Aya transforming into Ceres, she ends up in a coma throughout the rest of the series due to psychological shock.
Mr. Mikage (氏御影)
- Voiced by: Kunihiko Yasui (Japanese); Steve Olson (English)
Aya and Aki's father (whose real name is unknown). He died at the beginning of the series when he tried to protect Aya from being killed by her evil grandfather. He later appears in flashbacks.
Maya Hirobe (ヒロあり, Hirobe Maya)
A bespectacled teenage girl and student at an all-girls school called Tsukashima High School. In the manga she met Aya after getting attacked by a strange dog; a picture of her makes a cameo appearance in episode 17 of the anime series.
Dr. Kurotsuka (黒塚, Kurotsuka-sensei)

- Voiced by: Unshō Ishizuka (Japanese); Steve Olson (English)

A male doctor who runs a clinic in Niigata. After Toya was found unconscious at a nearby beach by a group of kids, Kurotsuka took care of him and nursed him back to health, until Toya escaped from the hospital in order to regain his memories. Despite his tough-looking appearance, he's very helpful and friendly, has a sense of humor and was even kind enough to lend Toya his motorcycle to rescue Aya. He has sanpaku-styled eyes, a tan complexion, and dark brown hair.
Kumi Akiyama (秋山 くみ, Akiyama Kumi)

- Voiced by: Kazusa Murai (Japanese); Elizabeth Stepkowski (English)

== Production ==
Ceres, Celestial Legend is the third manga series written by Yuu Watase. She based it on the legend of the tennin Ceres and her stolen hagoromo. This legend is also the basis for one of the most performed Japanese Noh plays, Hagoromo. It is the Japanese version of the Swan Maiden legend; versions from other cultures are mentioned throughout the series. As with most of her serials, Watase planned the basic story line of Ceres through to the end before beginning work. She notes that it is easier to work this way, but that even with planning sometimes the characters will "move on their own" and refuse to follow her original plans. When she reaches the end of the work, though, she can understand why they did so. Watase noted that one of the hardest parts of writing a serial manga was having to plan for a cliffhanger at the end of each chapter. She wanted each one to make the reader want to know what happened next, so they would want to keep reading.

To accurately depict the many locations used within the series, Watase traveled to Miyagi, Okinawa, and Tochigi to visit the locations where legends say Tennin landed. She was able to negotiate entry into some areas normally closed to the public. The characters in Ceres are not based on real people, but Watase notes that each one reflects some part of herself, as does the story as a whole. For example, Watase incorporated her thoughts on genetic engineering and other new technologies through the character of Kagami, who shows cruel disregard for the lives of the celestial beings he creates. While she feels such technologies can be useful to society, they should not be abused. Watase purposefully left Ceres' true nature ambiguous in the end, never clearly stating whether Ceres is an alien or truly a being descended from heaven. She notes, however, that part of the reason for this was that it wasn't something she'd thought about. On reflection, she felt Ceres was a symbol. In Japan, men are considered the dominant sex, and Watase notes that as a woman there are things about the system that anger her, such as men saying she is "just a woman." Ceres became a story about the relationship between men and women. She also wanted to show that while the Tennin and the humans in the story may have come from different origins, and evolved differently, they were still the same living creature in the end, with similar feelings and thoughts.

== Media ==
=== Manga ===
Written by Yuu Watase, Ceres, The Celestial Legend premiered in the May 1996 issue of Shogakukan's Shōjo Comic, and ran through the March 2000 issue. The chapters were later published in fourteen collected volumes, with the first volume released on December 11, 1996. Starting October 15, 2005, Shogakukan began re-releasing the series in six special edition volumes, with the final volume released December 15, 2005.

In 2001, Viz Media licensed the manga for an English language release in North America. The series was originally released in a flipped trade paperback format. Viz stopped publication after four volumes. In 2003, Viz re-released the first four volumes in unflipped standard manga-size volumes, along with the remaining ten volumes. In the table below, the dates and ISBN numbers given for the first four volumes are for their second edition re-releases.

==== Volume list ====
No.	Title	Original release date	English release date
1	Aya	December 11, 1996; 4-09-136354-7	October 29, 2003; 978-1569319802
2	Yûhi	March 19, 1997; 4-09-136355-5	February 4, 2004; 978-1569319819
3	Suzumi	June 26, 1997; 4-09-136356-3	May 5, 2004; 978-1569319826
4	Chidori	September 26, 1997; 4-09-136357-1	August 4, 2004; 978-1591166092
5	Mikage	December 15, 1997; 4-09-136358-X	October 29, 2004; 978-1569319796
6	Shuro	March 26, 1998; 4-09-136359-8	February 4, 2004; 978-1591161097
7	Maya	June 26, 1998; 4-09-136360-1	April 28, 2004; 978-1591162599
8	Miori	September 26, 1998; 4-09-137641-X	August 17, 2004; 978-1591162605
9	Progenitor	December 15, 1998; 4-09-137642-8	November 16, 2004; 978-1591162612
10	Monster	March 26, 1999; 4-09-137643-6	February 16, 2005; 978-1591162629
11	Maiden	June 26, 1999; 4-09-137644-4	May 10, 2005; 978-1591162636
12	Tôya	September 25, 1999; 4-09-137645-2	August 17, 2005; 978-1591162643
13	Ten'nyo	December 14, 1999; 4-09-137646-0	November 8, 2005; 978-1591162650
14	Hagoromo	March 25, 2000; 4-09-137647-9	February 7, 2006; 978-1421502632

=== Anime ===
Directed by Hajime Kamegaki and produced by Studio Pierrot, the anime television series adaptation aired in Japan on Wowow, from April 20 to September 28, 2000. It was released to VHS and DVD by Bandai Visual in twelve volumes, with each volume containing two episodes.

Ceres, Celestial Legend was licensed for Region 1 release by Viz Media, which also owns the North American license for the source manga. Viz released the series to VHS and DVD in eight three-episode volumes, with the first volume released on July 24, 2001. The VHS editions were dubbed in English, while the DVD volumes offered a choice between the dubbed English audio track and the original Japanese audio, with optional English subtitles. The DVD version also offers extra features, including art galleries, character profiles, and interviews with Yu Watase. In 2003, Viz re-released the series in two-volume collector's edition sets that contained twelve episodes on each disc, and all of the on-disc extras from earlier releases.

The English dubbed version of the series was broadcast in Southeast Asia by AXN-Asia. In 2014, Discotek Media announced their license for the series. Discotek re-released the series on June 6, 2015. Crunchyroll added the series in both English and Japanese.

=== Novel ===
The Ceres, Celestial Legend novels were written by Nishizaki Megumi and illustrated by Watase Yuu, with storylines created by both. The first three novels each tell a side story of one of the characters; the last novels contain a three-part sequel to the main story.

== Reception ==
Ceres, Celestial Legend won the 43rd Shogakukan Manga Award in the shōjo category in 1998.
