= Togari =

Togari may refer to:

- Togari (bean), a name for the pigeon pea (Cajanus cajan) in Kannada, India
- Togari (manga), a manga series written and illustrated by Yoshinori Natsume
- Sony Xperia Z Ultra, development codename Togari
- Togari (Japan), a place in the city of Chino, Nagano Prefecture
- Togari, Tasmania, a suburb within the Circular Head Council
