= Candy Flurry =

Japanese manga series by Ippon Takegushi

- First tankōbon volume cover, featuring Tsumugi Minase

アメノフル (Ame no Furu)
- Genre: Action; Comedy
- Manga
- Written by: Ippon Takegushi
- Illustrated by: Santa Mitarashi
- Published by: Shueisha
- English publisher: NA: Viz Media
- Imprint: Jump Comics
- Magazine: Weekly Shōnen Jump
- Original run: April 19, 2021 – September 13, 2021
- Volumes: 3
- icon

Candy Flurry (Japanese: アメノフル, Hepburn: Ame no Furu) is a Japanese manga series written by Ippon Takegushi and illustrated by Santa Mitarashi. It was serialized in Shueisha's Weekly Shōnen Jump from April to September 2021, with its chapters collected into three tankōbon volumes.

== Premise ==
The series follows Tsumugi Minase, a "sweets-user" who has the ability to control lollipops thanks to the Toy Toy Candy, a confection that gives those who eat it magical candy powers. However, a lollipop candy user destroyed the city of Tokyo five years ago, therefore she must keep her ability a secret.

== Publication ==
Candy Flurry is written by Ippon Takegushi and illustrated by Santa Mitarashi. The series was serialized in Shueisha's Weekly Shōnen Jump from April 19 to September 13, 2021. Shueisha collected its chapters into three tankōbon volumes, released from August 4 to December 3, 2021.

The series has been licensed for simultaneous publication in North America as it is released in Japan, with its chapters being digitally launched in English by Shueisha on its Manga Plus service, as well as by Viz Media on its service.

=== Volumes ===
No.	Original release date	Original ISBN	English release date	English ISBN
1	August 4, 2021	978-4-08-882778-0	March 28, 2023	978-1-9747-2845-9
1. "Rainfall" (雨の降る, Ame no Furu); 2. "Just Run Away" (逃げてしまえば, Nigete Shimaeba); 3. "Irie Senpai" (入江先輩); 4. "An Empty City" (誰もいない街, Daremoinai Machi); 5. "Senpai's Way Home" (先輩の帰路, Senpai no Kiro); 6. "Enlistment Exam" (入隊試験, Nyūtai Shiken); 7. "Maze" (迷路, Meiro)
2	October 4, 2021	978-4-08-882837-4	March 28, 2023	978-1-9747-3817-5
8. "An Emergency?" (緊急事態？, Kinkyū Jitai?); 9. "Counterattack With a Home Run" (反撃のホームラン, Hangeki no Hōmuran); 10. "Snowballing" (雪だるま式, Yukidaruma-shiki); 11. "Misaki's Torment" (ミサキの苦悩, Misaki no Kunō); 12. "There's Another" (もう1人いる, Mō Ichiri Iru); 13. "Any Idea" (心当たり, Kokoroatari); 14. "What's the Difference Between Me and Him?" (俺とあいつの何が違う, Ore to Aitsu no Nani ga Chigau); 15. "Winterscape" (雪景色, Yukigeshiki); 16. "The Same as Before" (前と同じこと, Mae to Onaji Koto)
3	December 3, 2021	978-4-08-882873-2	March 28, 2023	978-1-9747-3818-2
17. "Their Assertions" (それぞれの主張, Sorezore no Shuchō); 18. "What I Was Thinking" (考えていたこと, Kangaete Ita Koto); 19. "Full Swing" (フルスイング, Furu Suingu); Bonus 1: "After Everyone" (みんなのその後, Min'na no Sono Go); Bonus 2: "Guardian of the Holy Sword Hero" (聖剣の勇者の護衛, Seiken no Yūsha no Goei); Bonus 3: "Spaceship Minamo" (宇宙船ミナモ号, Uchūsen Minamo-Gō)

== Reception ==
Hannah Alton of Comic Book Resources praised the first two chapters of Candy Flurry, calling it a "sweet surprise", saying the manga "is off to a promising start thanks to its unique premise and endearing characters." She also believed at the time that "it could be the next big thing in Jump" so long as its unique premise does not make the series too obscure.

== See also ==
- Shinobi Undercover, another manga series by the same creators
