= Yoshinori Natsume =

Japanese manga artist

Yoshinori Natsume 夏目義徳
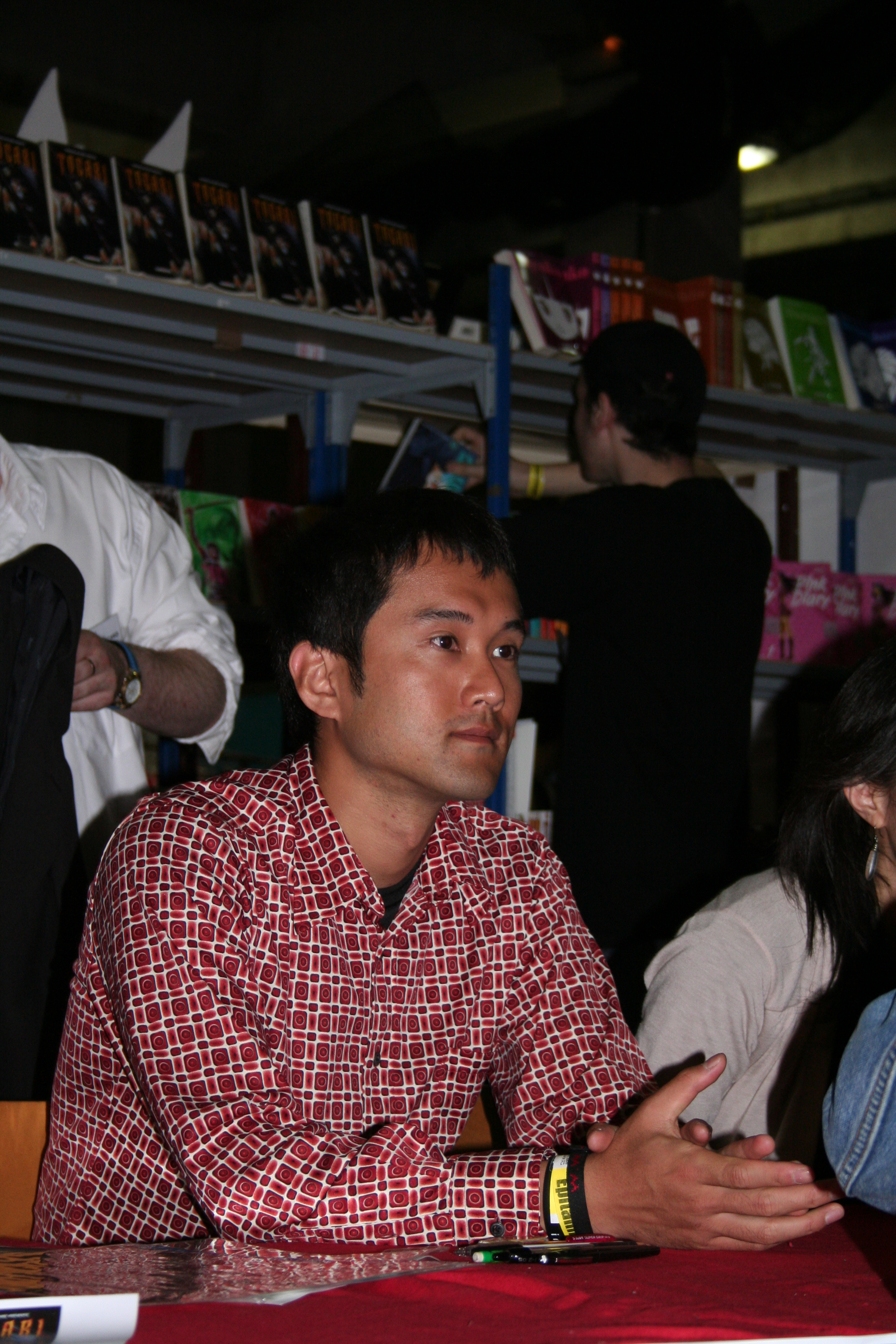
- Born: August 23, 1975 (age 51); Hiroshima, Japan
- Occupation: Manga artist
- Years active: 2000-present

Yoshinori Natsume (夏目義徳, Natsume Yoshinori; born August 23, 1975 in Hiroshima, Japan) is a Japanese manga artist.

He created Togari and authored the prestige format Batman manga mini-series Batman: Death Mask in April 2008. In 2013, he published his series White Tiger in Grand Jump.

== Works ==
A list of completed or working on projects:

- Togari
- Kurozakuro
- Batman: Death Mask
- Togari Shiro
- White Tiger

== See also ==
- Batman: Child of Dreams, the previous manga outing for Batman from Kia Asamiya.
- Batman: Black and White, an anthology of Batman stories, including a manga take from Katsuhiro Otomo.
