= Leave it to PET! =

Japanese manga series by Kenji Sonishi

まかせてPETくん (Makasete PET Kun)
- Genre: Comedy, family
- Manga
- Written by: Kenji Sonishi
- Published by: Poplar Publishing
- English publisher: Viz Media
- Magazine: Monthly Comic BunBun
- Original run: March 2004 – October 2008
- Volumes: 4

Leave it to PET! (まかせてPETくん, Makasete PET Kun) is a children's comedy manga series written and illustrated by Kenji Sonishi (そにしけんじ). The series was published by Poplar Publishing Co. Ltd. in Japan and licensed by Viz Media in North America.

== Plot ==
After a nine-year-old boy named Noboru Yamada recycles a plastic bottle he found in a bush, he meets PET, a small robot made from said bottle. As one of several "recycled super robots", PET attempts to solve Noboru's everyday problems, with humorous results.
