= Kurozakuro =

Japanese manga series

- Cover of the first volume, featuring Zakuro

クロザクロ
- Genre: Adventure; Dark fantasy; Supernatural
- Manga
- Written by: Yoshinori Natsume
- Published by: Shogakukan
- English publisher: NA: Viz Media
- Imprint: Shōnen Sunday Comics
- Magazine: Weekly Shōnen Sunday
- Original run: July 28, 2004 – December 7, 2005
- Volumes: 7
- icon

Kurozakuro (クロザクロ) is a Japanese manga series written and illustrated by Yoshinori Natsume. It was serialized in Shogakukan's shōnen manga magazine Weekly Shōnen Sunday from August 2004 to January 2006, with its chapters collected in seven tankōbon volumes. In North America, the manga was licensed for English release by Viz Media.

== Plot ==
Mikito Sakurai is a high school student who endures daily bullying but refuses to retaliate due to his aversion to violence. One day, a mysterious orb enters his bag and, while he sleeps, lodges itself in his mouth, causing him to swallow it. In a dream, he encounters a strange boy named Zakuro, who asks, "What is your desire?" Upon waking, Mikito discovers he no longer needs his glasses and experiences an insatiable hunger. When his bullies attempt to extort money from him, he is overwhelmed by an unfamiliar rage. After refusing their demands and hearing their taunts, he retaliates with a single punch, breaking one assailant's jaw and revealing his newfound superhuman strength.

Later, when confronted by a larger group of bullies, Mikito violently defeats them, realizing he now takes pleasure in bloodshed—a stark contrast to his previous revulsion. However, his power carries a dire consequence: violent impulses consume him, distorting his perception of others as mere "meat." He struggles against an overwhelming urge to consume human flesh, even nearly attacking his own sister. One night, he senses an ominous presence and follows it to a gruesome scene where a man stands over a murdered woman. The man initially mistakes Mikito for an ally before a cloaked assailant interrupts, wielding strange weapons and wearing a bell on his right ear.

The murderer transforms into an ogre, engaging in a brief battle before the cloaked man gains the upper hand. The dying ogre begs Mikito to transform and assist him, but the cloaked man swiftly executes the creature before turning on Mikito. His weapon weakens Mikito, who barely escapes after being threatened with the murder of his family if he resists. Mikito later learns that the orb he ingested was an ogre core, an object that transforms humans into ogres. His existence soon attracts the attention of Ogre Hunters, setting the stage for further conflict.

== Publication ==
Written and illustrated by Yoshinori Natsume, Kurozakuro was serialized in Shogakukan's shōnen manga magazine Weekly Shōnen Sunday from July 28, 2004, to December 7, 2005. (Note: The series started in the magazine's 35th issue of 2004 (with cover date August 11), released on July 28 of that same year; it finished in the magazine's first issue of 2006 (with cover date January 1), released on December 7, 2005.) Shogakukan collected its chapters in seven tankōbon volumes, released from November 18, 2004, to February 17, 2006.

In North America, the manga was licensed for English release by Viz Media. The seven volumes were published from November 9, 2010, to November 8, 2011.

== Reception ==
Carlo Santos of Anime News Network observed that the series unfolds unpredictably within an ever-expanding universe. He praised the intensity of Natsume's artwork, describing it as the stylistic opposite of Rumiko Takahashi and Mitsuru Adachi due to its sharp, jagged lines, thick penstrokes, and stark black-and-white contrasts, though he noted this approach could prejudice the character designs and panel layouts. In a separate review, Santos commended Natsume for integrating his personal philosophy as a creator, framing exciting, well-paced fight scenes within a broader debate on good and evil.

Chris Zimmerman of Comic Book Bin described the first volume as a fascinating twist on the supernatural genre, noting its shōnen premise was executed with the substance of a psychological thriller. He found it compulsively entertaining due to its gothic elements but criticized the artwork as overly simplistic and flat. His colleague, Leroy Douresseaux, likened the series to "Harry Potter with a dash of Steve Ditko's The Creeper, recommending it while expressing disappointment that it ended prematurely.

For Active Anime, Whitney Cox found the plot intriguing and dark, with particular praise for the main character, Mikito. Another Active Anime reviewer, Davey C. Jones, enjoyed the "cool moves, dire battles and secrets" but described the artwork as chaotic.
