= Viz Media =

American entertainment company

Viz Media, LLC
- Logo used since 2017
- Type: Subsidiary
- Industry: Entertainment
- Genre: Manga; anime
- Founded: July 2, 1986; 40 years ago (as Viz, LLC)
- Founder: Seiji Horibuchi
- Headquarters: 1355 Market Street, Unit 200, San Francisco, California, U.S.
- Areas served: North America, Central America, South America, Oceania
- Key people: Ken Sasaki (president and CEO); Hidemi Fukuhara (vice-president)
- Services: Licensing; publishing; streaming; television
- Parent: Shogakukan-Shueisha Productions
- Divisions: Viz Productions (film and television)
- Website: www.viz.com

Viz Media, LLC is an American entertainment company, focused on publishing manga, and distributing and licensing Japanese anime, films, and television series.

The company was founded in 1986 as Viz, LLC. In 2005, Viz and ShoPro Entertainment merged to form the current Viz Media, which is owned by Japanese publishing conglomerates Shueisha and Shogakukan, as well as Japanese production company Shogakukan-Shueisha Productions (ShoPro). In 2017, Viz Media was the largest publisher of graphic novels in the United States in the bookstore market, with a 23% share of the market.

== History ==
=== Founding ===
Former Viz Media logo

Seiji Horibuchi, originally from Tokushima Prefecture in Shikoku, Japan, moved to California, United States in 1975. After living in the suburbs for almost two years, he moved to San Francisco, where he started a business exporting American cultural items to Japan, and became a writer of cultural information. He also became interested in publishing Japanese manga in the United States, though he himself was not a fan of Japanese comics until a visit to Japan in 1985 exposed him to Katsuhiro Otomo's single-volume title Domu: A Child's Dream. His idea came to fruition after he met Masahiro Ohga, then managing director of Shogakukan, in 1985 and shared his vision. Shogakukan provided Horibuchi with $200,000 in startup capital, which Horibuchi used in 1986 to found Viz Communications.

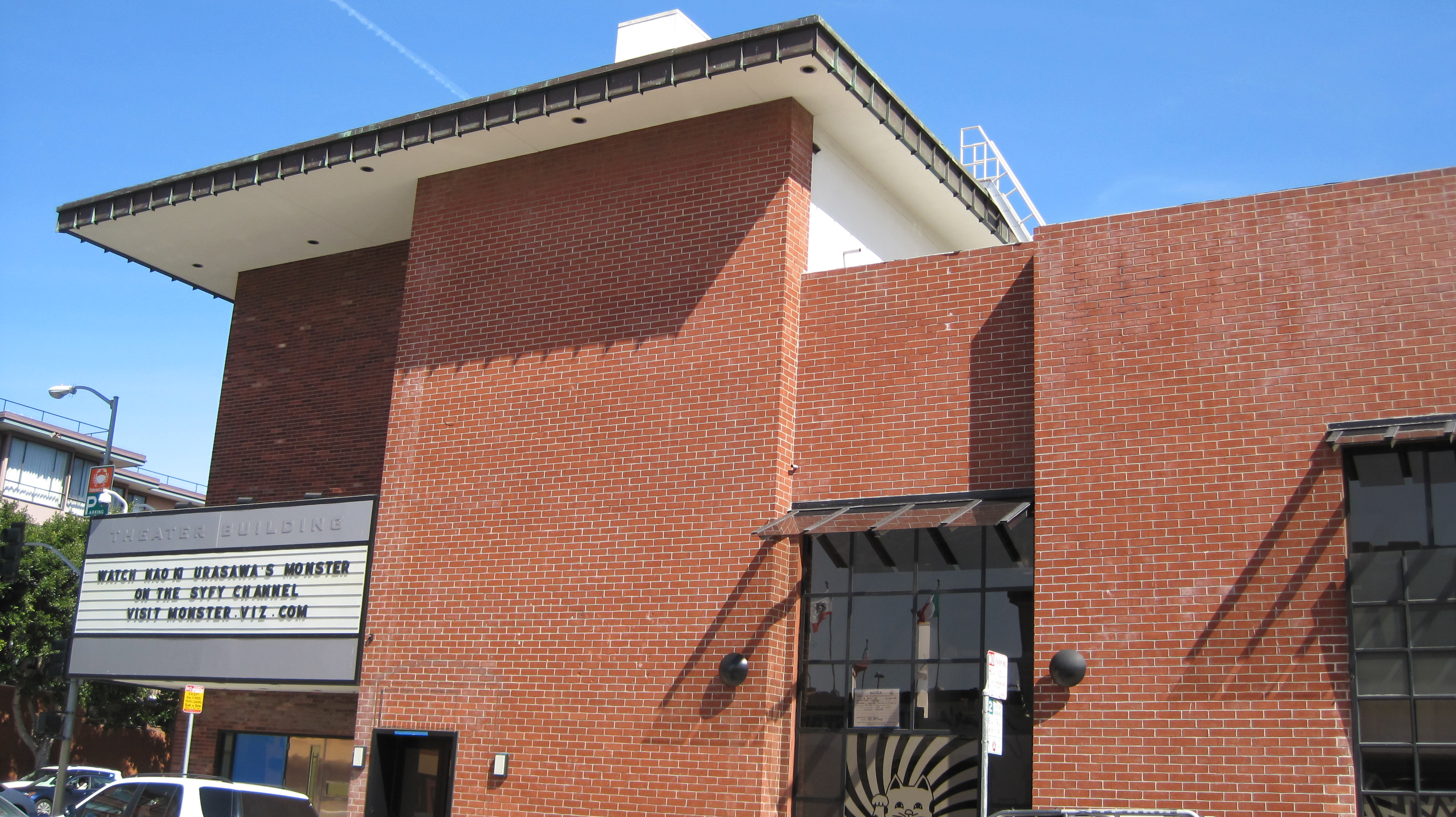
The exterior of Viz Media's former headquarters in San Francisco, California

Viz Communications released its first titles in 1987, which included Legend of Kamui; however, sales were mediocre due to the specialist comic market being averse to venturing into new territory. To counteract this problem, Viz expanded into the general publishing business and began publishing various art related books in 1992. Into these titles, Horibuchi began publishing manga, calling them graphic novels so they would be carried by mainstream bookstores. The plan worked, and after several years, leading booksellers began to have dedicated shelves for manga titles. Sales also picked up when Viz Communications acquired the license for the comedy series Ranma ½, which became an instant hit.

The company continued to see success when it expanded into the anime distribution market, began publishing Shonen Jump, an English adaptation of the popular Japanese magazine Weekly Shōnen Jump. It also acquired another huge selling title, Inuyasha. In the late 1990s, Viz began making the push to move into the European and South American markets.

=== Shueisha co-ownership (2000–2005) ===
When Shueisha became a joint owner of Viz in 2002, both Shogakukan and Shueisha began to release manga exclusively through Viz. Shueisha's deal with Viz may have been prompted by competition with Raijin Comics, a rival manga publisher created in 2002 by editors and artists who had split off from Shueisha, taking their properties with them.

Some exceptions to this exclusivity exist, however: Shueisha permitted DC Comics's subsidiary CMX Manga to license Tenjho Tenge (although it was later re-licensed and re-released by Viz Media) and Kamikaze Kaito Jeanne, permitted Dark Horse Comics to license Gantz, Lady Snowblood, Shadow Lady, The Monkey King, and recently Yasuhiro Nightow's Blood Blockade Battlefront and CLAMP's Gate 7.

Shueisha also permitted Udon Entertainment to license The Rose of Versailles, Seven Seas Entertainment to license Hayate X Blade, and will later permit Seven Seas Entertainment to license To Love Ru, Yuuna and the Haunted Hot Springs and Super HxEros, and permitted Tokyopop to license Kodocha, Marmalade Boy, and Digimon Next and Manga Planet to license Silver Fang -The Shooting Star Gin- and allowed Kodansha USA to license the Battle Angel Alita manga in America. Shogakukan permitted Tokyopop to license Corrector Yui (even though Viz Media licensed the anime) and Yumi Tsukirino's Stitch! manga (because Tokyopop had the exclusive rights to Disney manga in North America), Seven Seas Entertainment to license Dai Dark, Orb: On the Movements of the Earth, Polar Bear Cafe, and the Himitsu Sentai Gorenger manga and Digital Manga to license The Amazing 3 manga by Osamu Tezuka, Udon Entertainment to license the Infini-T Force manga (even though Viz Media licensed the anime), the now-defunct ComicsOne to license Wounded Man - The White Haired Demon, permitted Dark Horse Comics to license Crying Freeman (even though it was previously licensed by Viz), New Lone Wolf and Cub (however, this is because Dark Horse has the original series), The Legend of Zelda: Skyward Sword, and Mob Psycho 100, and permitted Hachette Book Group's subsidiary Yen Press to license Azumanga Daioh, Fate Rewinder, Silver Spoon, Karakai Jōzu no Takagi-san, My Teen Romantic Comedy SNAFU, and Cirque du Freak (however for Cirque du Freak, this is because their sister company publishes the original novels. For Azumanga Daioh, Yen Press's license of the manga was a month before Shogakukan reprinted the manga in May 2009, resulting in a change of license holders from ASCII Media Works (when Yen Press announced the license) to Shogakukan (when Yen Press released it). The Yen Press edition is a newly translated and lettered version of ADV Manga's edition (taken from ASCII Media Works) as opposed to the 3-volume edition by Shogakukan. Yen Press has expressed interest in releasing the 3-volume edition although editor Kurt Hassler said he is not "sure this will be possible.", possibly because Shogakukan owns Viz and that they almost exclusively license their titles to them). In March 2010, Shogakukan began a partnership with Fantagraphics Books to issue a line of manga to be edited by Matt Thorn. In 2003, possibly in response to Shogakukan and Shueisha's co-ownership of Viz, Japanese publisher Kodansha formed a co-venture with Del Rey.

=== ShoPro merger and Restructuring (2005–2013) ===
In 2005, Viz Communications merged with ShoPro Entertainment, an American subisidary of Shogakukan and was renamed to Viz Media. Horibuchi became the new company's chairman. During the same year, Horibuchi started a related division, Viz Pictures, for releasing selected live-action films in the US to theaters and DVD.

On December 17, 2008, Viz Media announced that starting on April 1, 2009, Warner Home Video (now Warner Bros. Home Entertainment via Studio Distribution Services) would be handling the distribution of both its new and existing catalog releases. Viz itself is still the licensor and will do all production, while tapping the distribution powerhouse that distributes the works of other major companies such as Disney XD, Adult Swim, and Cartoon Network. Viz president and CEO Hidemi Fukuhara stated that he believes the partnership will help the company grow its anime holdings more effectively.

On February 20, 2009, Viz Media laid off an unknown number of employees in order to help be more streamlined to face the current economic climate. On May 11, 2010, Viz Media again laid off a number of workers, 60 this time, again in order to try to become more streamlined. This time they released a press release claiming that none of their current product lines would be affected.

On April 2, 2012, it was announced that the senior vice-president and general manager of Viz Media Ken Sasaki would be succeeding executive producer Hidemi Fukuhara as president and CEO; Fukuhara will subsequently take up the position of vice-president at the end of the month.

=== Partnerships and expansion (2013–present) ===
In 2013, Viz began distributing titles to the Philippines. In 2014, it announced it would do the same in India with 75 Shueisha titles being released in that country; Viz titles had been distributed unofficially to that country prior to the announcement.

On July 3, 2019, Viz Media partnered with Crunchyroll to distribute select Crunchyroll licensed titles on home video and electronic sell-through in the United States and Canada.

In 2020, Viz Media saw a 70% growth in the U.S. market, in line with a 43% increase in overall manga sales in the United States the same year.

On July 3, 2020, Funimation announced that they would begin streaming the original Naruto series on July 6. More content from Viz Media started to launch in their catalog such as Hunter × Hunter, Sailor Moon R: The Movie, and two Berserk films.

On September 9, 2020, Funimation announced that they had reached a distribution partnership with Viz Media, with Viz Media titles being made available to stream on Funimation's website. The deal was made after select Viz titles were previously made available on Funimation.

On May 9, 2023, Viz Media launched a digital manga service called "Viz Manga", featuring licenses from Shogakukan and Shueisha that are not published on the digital "Shonen Jump" service, and has simultaneous English releases of ongoing manga.

On July 5, 2024, Viz announced on their social media channels that they had acquired RWBY following the closure of its original parent company, Rooster Teeth—several months prior.

== Manga ratings ==
In contrast to similar TV and film ratings, Viz also has set up certain "manga ratings" for their products based on their content.

- A (ALL AGES) 6+: May be suitable for readers or consumers of any age. For example, may contain mild language and fantasy violence but no swearing or nudity.
- T (TEEN) 13+: May be suitable for early teens and older. For example, may contain violence, infrequent use of strong language, suggestive themes or situations, crude humor, alcohol and/or tobacco use.
- T+ (TEEN PLUS) 16+: May be suitable for older teens and adults. For example, may contain intense and/or gory violence, sexual content, frequent strong language, alcohol, tobacco and/or other substance use.
- M (MATURE) 18+: Suitable for adults only. May contain extreme violence, mature themes and graphic depictions.

Despite its name, Viz's manga ratings were also used on licensed anime titles, though, in the later 2000s, they instead relied on local countries' rating systems.

== Reception ==
Viz Media was awarded the Manga Publisher of the Year Gem Award by Diamond Comic Distributors in 2007. Viz continues to publish many titles, some of the most popular including: Dragon Ball, One Piece, Detective Conan (as Case Closed), Bleach, Inuyasha, and Naruto which results a high success of the company as well as a large amount of the North American readers.

Viz also received an award for Manga Trade Paperback of the Year for its release of the fourteenth volume of the Naruto series.

=== Publication style ===
By 2002, Viz Communications kept some publications in the original right-to-left format, while in other publications it mirrored pages from Japan's right-to-left reading format to fit the Western left-to-right reading style. During that year Dallas Middaugh, the senior marketing manager of Viz, stated that the left-to-right version of Neon Genesis Evangelion outsold the right-to-left version of Neon Genesis Evangelion on a three to one basis; Middaugh concluded that readers wanted "an easy reading experience." Akira Toriyama, creator of Dragon Ball, requested that his work, which was separated by Viz into Dragon Ball and Dragon Ball Z, be published in the original right-to-left format. Vagabond was printed in right-to-left to preserve historical accuracy. Middaugh said that younger readers of Dragon Ball adapted to the right to left format more easily than their parents.

Viz has censored some of its titles. Some titles, such as Dragon Ball, were published in both censored and uncensored forms.

== Divisions ==
=== Viz Productions ===
Based in Los Angeles, Viz Productions coordinates the licenses of Japanese material (manga, books, and film) to American film companies. Their goal is to involve the Japanese creators in the production and facilitate communication between all parties in the US and Japan. Viz Productions' first film is the live action adaptation of All You Need Is Kill, Edge of Tomorrow, starring Tom Cruise and Emily Blunt. Their second production was the American live-action adaptation to the supernatural thriller manga series: Death Note, which was directed by Adam Wingard and starred Nat Wolff, as the film's lead.

Viz also has many partnerships with various authors and celebrities, perhaps the most famous being the cosplay film that debuted in the 2013 Tokyo Anime Festival with Kirata Uchiha, played by JadexRoyal. Winning multiple awards for the board including Masashi Kishimoto, others include Full Moon and Last Quarter.

==== Films ====
- Edge of Tomorrow

==== Television ====
- Seis Manos

=== New People ===
In November 2005, New People was officially formed as a sister company for releasing live-action Japanese films as theatrical releases in selected markets called Viz Pictures. According to Horibuchi, the company will focus on films that focus on the "Japanese 'kawaii (cute) and cool' pop culture." In 2007, the division released seven films to theaters, including Train Man: Densha Otoko and Honey and Clover. DVD releases for all Viz Pictures films are distributed exclusively by its parent, Viz Media. Viz Pictures renamed themselves to New People and no longer shares office space or employees with Viz Media. Viz Media no longer distributes DVD and Blu-ray releases of their products.

==== Entertainment complex ====
In August 2009, Viz Pictures (now known as New People and a separate entity from Viz Media) opened a three-story entertainment complex in San Francisco called New People. The center piece of the complex is a 143-seat movie theater that screens anime and Japanese live-action films. The center also has a cafe, a store selling anime and manga related items, as well as stores offering Japanese clothing items.

=== Neon Alley ===
Neon Alley was a streaming service dedicated to anime and related programming established in October 2012. After moving streaming content from its own platform to Hulu, the branding would be retired in May 2016.

=== Publications ===
==== Animerica ====
Animerica was a quarterly anime and manga digest that initially started as a monthly magazine featuring reviews of anime and manga titles, as well as related works. After a preview issue was released in November 1992, the magazine's first issue was released in February 1993 with a March 1993 cover date. The magazine originally featured articles and reviews on manga, anime, and related media, as well as manga preview chapters. In 1998, Animerica Extra was launched as a manga anthology that eventually focused specifically on shōjo titles. It was canceled in 2004.

Viz changed the magazine's format in April 2005, with the new magazine really being two free publications of the same name. One is advertising-oriented and created specially for distribution at anime and manga conventions while the other is more general in scope and distributed through retail stores. Both versions have fewer and briefer articles and a lower page count. The last monthly issue of the original format Animerica had a cover date of June 2005 (Volume 13, No. 6).

Animerica was one of the first professional anime and manga magazines released in the United States, and one of the most popular in the 1990s. In 2004, it had a circulation of 45,000 readers, but low sales and high competition from Newtype USA resulted in the essential cancellation of the original magazine and its reformatting as a free digest.

==== Game On! USA ====
Game On! USA was a monthly magazine that focused primarily on Japanese-developed video games, with an emphasis on the import scene. It served as the American counterpart to Shogakukan's Game On! magazine. It was published in May 1996 and ran for 7 monthly issues before being discontinued that same year in November. The magazine had news and reviews and other articles about classic fighting games like Street Fighter, Samurai Shodown and Virtua Fighter. Two video game-based manga series, Super Street Fighter II: Cammy by Masahiko Nakahira, and Samurai Shodown by Kyoichi Nanatsuki and Yuki Miyoshi, were serialized in the magazine. A one shot story based on Battle Arena Toshinden, illustrated by the game's character designer Tsukasa Kotobuki was published in the magazine as well.

==== Manga Vizion ====
Manga Vizion, sometimes misspelled Manga Vision, is a manga anthology introduced by Viz in 1995. It is believed to be the first manga anthology published in the United States. The premiere issue was dated March 1995 and featured three series: The Tragedy of P, Samurai Crusader: The Kumomaru Chronicles, and Ogre Slayer. It ran for three and a half years until it was canceled in August 1998.

==== Pulp ====
Pulp was a monthly manga anthology introduced by Viz in 1997. The magazine featured more mature titles, marketed at adults rather than teenage readers. Some of titles serialized in the magazine included: Uzumaki, Banana Fish, and Dance till Tomorrow. The magazine was canceled in 2002.

==== Shonen Jump ====
Shonen Jump is a shōnen manga anthology that debuted in November 2002, with a January 2003 cover date. Based on the popular Japanese anthology Weekly Shōnen Jump, published by Shueisha, Shonen Jump is retooled for English readers and the American audience and is published monthly, instead of weekly. It features serialized chapters from seven manga series, and articles on Japanese language and culture, as well as manga, anime, video games, and figurines. In conjunction with the magazine, Viz launched new imprints for releasing media related to the series presented in the magazine, and other shōnen works. This includes two new manga imprints, an anime DVD imprint, a fiction line for releasing light novels, a label for fan and data books, and a label for the release of art books.

Prior to the magazine's launch, Viz launched an extensive marketing campaign to promote the magazine and help it succeed where other manga anthologies in North America have failed. Shueisha purchased an equity interest in Viz to help fund the venture, and Cartoon Network, Suncoast, and Diamond Distributors became promotional partners in the magazine. The first issue required three printings to meet demand, with over 300,000 copies sold. It was awarded the ICv2 "Comic Product of the Year" award in December 2002, and has continued to enjoy high sales with a monthly circulation of 215,000 in 2008.

==== Shojo Beat ====
Shojo Beat was a shōjo manga magazine Viz launched in June 2005 as a sister magazine for Shonen Jump. It featured serialized chapters from six manga series as well as articles on Japanese culture, manga, anime, fashion and beauty. Viz launched related "Shojo Beat" imprints in its manga, light novel, and anime divisions to coordinate with the magazine's contents.

Targeted at women ages 16–18, the first issue of Shojo Beat launched with a circulation of 20,000 copies. By 2007, average circulation was approximately 38,000 copies. Half of its circulation came from subscriptions rather than store sales. In May 2009, the magazine was discontinued after 49 issues, with the July 2009 issue being the last released. Viz stated the "difficult economic climate" was behind the magazine's cancellation, and that it would continue releasing the magazine's titles, as well as others, using the "Shojo Beat" imprint.

==== Haikasoru ====
In January 2009, Viz Media announced plans to launch a Japanese science fiction novel line called Haikasoru. The first novels were scheduled to be released in the summer of the same year, with four novels: The Lord of the Sands of Time by Issui Ogawa, ZOO by Otsuichi, All You Need Is Kill by Hiroshi Sakurazaka, and Usurper of the Sun by Hōsuke Nojiri. In addition, the imprint released an expanded edition of Kōshun Takami's Battle Royale. In 2010, the imprint release Project Itoh's novel Harmony, which later won a Special Citation Philip K. Dick Award. The imprint is distributed to trade by Simon & Schuster.

==== SuBLime ====
In October 2011, Viz Media launched SuBLime as an imprint for boys' love titles. The imprint was formed in collaboration with the Japanese publisher Libre and its parent company Animate to publish English-language boys' love manga for the print and worldwide digital market. Although the first slate of books announced under SuBLime are Libre titles, the imprint will potentially offer titles from other Japanese publishers in the future.

=== Business partnerships ===
In March 2016, Viz Media announced that they are collaborating with United Talent Agency on their live action projects based on anime series. On July 3, 2019, Viz Media announced that they had partnered with Crunchyroll to distribute select Crunchyroll licensed titles on home video and electronic sell-through in the United States and Canada, as well as stream selected Viz Media titles on Crunchyroll.

== Titles ==
=== Manga ===
==== Currently licensed ====
===== Viz Originals =====
- Ashe in Orbit †
- Astray †
- BETWIXT
- Champion of the Rose †
- Devil's Candy †
- Diabo a Quatro †
- Fangirl
- The Girl That Can't Get a Girlfriend
- I'm the Grim Reaper †
- Lynx †
- Not So Shoujo Love Story †
- Star Wars: The Mandalorian - The Manga †
- Status Royale †
- World Piece

===== Viz Media =====
- 07-Ghost
- After Hours
- The Amazing Digital Circus †
- And Then There Were None †
- Animal Crossing New Horizons: Deserted Island Diary
- BakéGyamon
- Beyblade X †
- The Children Nowadays
- Deadman Wonderland
- Destroy All Humans. They Can't Be Regenerated. A Magic: The Gathering Manga †
- Detroit Metal City
- Dinosaur Hour
- Disney Twisted-Wonderland †
  - Disney Twisted-Wonderland: The Manga—Anthology †
- Dogs
- Excel Saga
- Firefighter! Daigo of Fire Company M
- Flame of Recca
- Fluffy Fluffy Cinnamoroll
- Fullmetal Alchemist †††
- Gestalt
- Girl Crush †
- Happy Happy Clover
- How Do We Relationship? †
- Ikigami: The Ultimate Limit
- Jormungand
- Kamudo †
- Kirby Manga Mania †
- The Law of Ueki
- Leave it to PET!
- The Legend of Zelda
  - The Legend of Zelda: Twilight Princess
- Little Battlers Experience
- Love's in Sight!
- Loveless †
- MÄR
- Marvel
  - Deadpool: Samurai †
  - Secret Reverse
  - Spider-Man: Fake Red
  - Spider-Man: Kizuna †
  - Spider-Man: Octo-Girl †
  - Ultraman: Along Came a Spider-Man †
  - Wolverine: Snikt!
  - X-Men: The Manga †
- MegaMan NT Warrior
- Minecraft: The Manga †
- Neon Genesis Evangelion
- Nightmare Inspector: Yumekui Kenbun †††
- O-Parts Hunter †††
- One-pound Gospel
- Persona 5 †
- Pokémon †
  - Pokémon Adventures †
  - Pokémon Diamond and Pearl Adventure!
  - Pokémon Mystery Dungeon: Ginji's Rescue Team
- Portus
- Radiant †
- Rainbows After Storms †
- The Record of a Fallen Vampire †††
- Record of Grancrest War
- Requiem of the Rose King
- Sexy Voice and Robo
- Splatoon
  - Splatoon: Squid Kids Comedy Show †
  - Splatoon 3: Splatlands †
- Star Wars: Guardians of the Whills
- Star Wars: The High Republic – The Edge of Balance †
- Star Wars: The Legends of Luke Skywalker
- Star Wars: Visions
- Star Wars: Visions: Tsukumo
- Super Mario Adventures
- Switch
- That Blue Sky Feeling
- Tiger & Bunny
- Transformers: The Manga
- A Tropical Fish Yearns for Snow
- Turning Red: 4*Town 4*Real
- Tuxedo Gin
- Video Girl Ai
- Wolf's Rain
- X
- Yo-kai Watch

===== Shojo Beat =====
- Absolute Boyfriend
- Ai Ore!
- Aishiteruze Baby
- Alice 19th
- Angel Sanctuary
- Anonymous Noise
- Ao Haru Ride
- Baby & Me
- Backstage Prince
- Banana Fish
- Basara
- Beast Master
- Beauty Is the Beast
- Beauty Pop
- Behind the Scenes!!
- Black Bird
- Blank Slate
- Bloody Mary
- Boys Over Flowers
  - Boys Over Flowers Season 2
- Butterflies, Flowers
- Cactus's Secret
- Captive Hearts
- Ceres, Celestial Legend
- Colette Decides to Die †
- Crown of Love
- Crown of Thorns
- Dawn of the Arcana
- Daydream Darling
- Daytime Shooting Star
- Demon Love Spell
- The Demon Prince of Momochi House
  - The Demon Prince of Momochi House: Succession
- Dengeki Daisy
- Descendants of Darkness ††
- A Devil and Her Love Song
- Dolls
- Doubt!!
- The Earl and the Fairy
- Earl Cain
- Everyone's Getting Married
- The Exorcist and the Lovestruck Raven †
- Fairy Cube
- Fall in Love Like a Comic!
- Firefly Wedding †
- Flower in a Storm
- From Far Away
- Full Moon o Sagashite
- Fushigi Yûgi
- Fushigi Yûgi: Byakko Senki †
- Fushigi Yûgi: Genbu Kaiden
- Gaba Kawa
- The Gentlemen's Alliance Cross
- Godchild
- Grand Guignol Orchestra
- Hana-Kimi
- Happy Hustle High
- Happy Marriage!?
- Heaven's Will
- The Heiress and the Chauffeur
- Here Is Greenwood
- High School Debut
- His Sweet Solace †
- Honey and Clover
- Honey Blood
- Honey Hunt
- Honey So Sweet
- Hot Gimmick
- I'm No Angel †
- I.O.N
- Idol Dreams †
- Ima Koi: Now I'm in Love
- Imadoki!
- In the Name of the Mermaid Princess
- An Incurable Case of Love
- Jiu Jiu
- Kakuriyo: Bed & Breakfast for Spirits †
- Kamikaze Girls
- Kamisama Kiss
- Kare First Love
- Kaze Hikaru †
- Kenka Bancho Otome: Girl Beats Boys
- Kimi ni Todoke
  - Kimi ni Todoke: From Me to You: Soulmate
- The King's Beast
- Kiss of the Rose Princess
- Komomo Confiserie
- La Corda d'Oro
- Last Quarter
- Let's Do It Already!
- Library Wars
- Like a Butterfly
- Love Com
- Love Me, Love Me Not
- The Magic Touch
- Magical Girl Dandelion †
- Maid Sama!
- MeruPuri
- Meteor Prince
- Midnight Secretary
- Millennium Snow
- Mistress Fortune
- Mixed Vegetables
- Monkey High!
- My Love Mix-Up!
- My Love Story!!
- My Special One
- Nana
- Natsume's Book of Friends †
- Neighborhood Story
- No Glass Slippers for Me: Reincarnated Cinderella †
- Not Your Idol †
- Oresama Teacher
- Otaku Vampire's Love Bite †
- Otomen
- Ouran High School Host Club
- Phantom Thief Jeanne
- Pink Candy Kiss †
- Please Save My Earth
- Prince Freya †
- Punch!
- QQ Sweeper
  - Queen's Quality
- Rainbow Days
- Rasetsu
- Red River
- Revolutionary Girl Utena
  - Revolutionary Girl Utena: After the Revolution
- Romantic Killer
- Rosen Blood
- S · A: Special A
- Sakura Hime: The Legend of Princess Sakura
- Sakura, Saku
- Sand Chronicles
- The Seaside Where Dragon Boys Dwell †
- Seiho Boys' High School!
- Short-Tempered Melancholic
- Shortcake Cake
- Shuriken and Pleats
- Skip Beat! †
- Snow Angel
- Snow White with the Red Hair †
- So Cute it Hurts!!
- SP Baby
- Spell of Desire
- St. Dragon Girl
- A Star Brighter Than the Sun †
- Stepping on Roses
- The Story of Saiunkoku
- Strobe Edge
- Sugar Princess
- Sweet Rein
- Tail of the Moon
- Takane and Hana
- Tamon's B-Side †
- Time Stranger Kyoko
- Tokyo Boys & Girls
- Ultra Maniac
- Vampire Knight
- Vampire Knight: Memories
- Voice Over! Seiyu Academy
- W Juliet
- Wanted
- The Water Dragon's Bride
- We Were There
- Wild Ones
- Wolf Girl and Black Prince
- Yakuza Lover
- Yona of the Dawn †
- The Young Master's Revenge
- Yukarism
- Yume Kira Dream Shoppe
- Yurara

===== Shonen Jump =====
- 7thGarden †
- Agravity Boys
- Akane-banashi †
- Akira Toriyama's Manga Theater
- Aliens Area
- All You Need Is Kill
- Assassination Classroom
- Astra Lost in Space
- Astro Baby †
- Astro Royale
- Ayashimon
- Bakuman
- Barrage
- Beast Children
- Beat & Motion
- Black Cat
- Black Clover †
- Black Torch
- Blade of the Moon Princess
- Bleach
- Blue Box †
- Blue Exorcist †
- Bobobo-bo Bo-bobo ††
- Bone Collection
- Boruto: Naruto Next Generations †
  - Boruto: Two Blue Vortex †
- The Bugle Call: Song of War †
- Build King
- Burn the Witch †
- Buso Renkin
- Candy Flurry
- Chainsaw Man †
- Cipher Academy
- Claymore
- The Comiq
- Cowa!
- Cross Manage
- D.Gray-man †
- Dandadan †
- Dark Gathering †
- Dear Anemone
- Death Note
  - Death Note: Short Stories
- Demon Slayer: Kimetsu no Yaiba
  - Demon Slayer: Kimetsu Academy †
  - Demon Slayer: Kimetsu no Yaiba ― Stories of Water and Flame
- Do Retry
- Doron Dororon
- Double Taisei
- Dr. Slump
- Dr. Stone
  - Dr. Stone Reboot: Byakuya
- Dragon Ball
  - Dragon Ball Super †
  - Dragon Ball: That Time I Got Reincarnated as Yamcha
- Dragon Quest: The Adventure of Dai †
- Earthchild
- ēlDLIVE
- The Elusive Samurai †
- Embers
- Eyeshield 21
- Fabricant 100
- Food Wars!
- Four Lives Remain: Tatsuya Endo Before Spy × Family
- Genkaku Picasso
- Ghost Reaper Girl †
- Gin Tama ††
- Ginka & Glüna
- Gokurakugai †
- Green Green Greens
- Guardian of the Witch
- Gun Blaze West
- Haikyu!!
- Hard-Boiled Cop and Dolphin
- Harukaze Mound
- Hell Warden Higuma
- Hi-Fi Cluster
- High School Family: Kokosei Kazoku
- Hikaru no Go
- Hima-Ten! †
- Hoshin Engi
- Hunter × Hunter †
- The Hunters Guild: Red Hood
- I"s
- I'm From Japan
- I Tell C
- Ice-Head Gill
- Ichi the Witch †
- Ichigoki's Under Control!!
- The Ichinose Family's Deadly Sins
- Jaco the Galactic Patrolman
- Jiangshi X
- JoJo's Bizarre Adventure †
  - JoJo's Bizarre Adventure: Shining Diamond's Demonic Heartbreak
  - Thus Spoke Kishibe Rohan †
- Jujutsu Kaisen
  - Jujutsu Kaisen 0
  - Jujutsu Kaisen Modulo †
- Juni Taisen: Zodiac War
- Just Listen to the Song
- Kagurabachi †
- Kaguya-sama: Love Is War
- Kaiju No. 8
  - Kaiju No. 8: B-Side
  - Kaiju No. 8 Relax †
- Kaiu Shirai x Posuka Demizu: Beyond The Promised Neverland
- Kill Blue †
- Knights of the Zodiac
- Koyoharu Gotouge Before Demon Slayer: Kimetsu no Yaiba
- Kubo Won't Let Me Be Invisible
- Kuroko's Basketball
- Kurumizawa's Folly
- Kyokuto Necromance
- The Last Saiyuki
- Love Rush!
- Magu-chan: God of Destruction
- MamaYuyu
- Marriagetoxin †
- The Marshal King †
- Martial Master Asumi
- Mashle: Magic and Muscles
- Me & Roboco †
- Mission: Yozakura Family †
- Mitama Security: Spirit Busters
- Moriarty the Patriot †
- Moriking
- Muhyo & Roji's Bureau of Supernatural Investigation
- My Hero Academia
  - My Hero Academia: Smash!!
  - My Hero Academia: Team-Up Missions †
  - My Hero Academia: Vigilantes
- Naruto
  - Naruto: Chibi Sasuke's Sharingan Legend
  - Naruto: Konoha's Story — The Steam Ninja Scrolls
  - Naruto: Sasuke's Story — The Uchiha and the Heavenly Stardust
  - Naruto: The Seventh Hokage and the Scarlet Spring
- ne0;lation
- Neru: Way of the Martial Artist
- Nine Dragons' Ball Parade
- Nisekoi: False Love
- Nora: The Last Chronicle of Devildom
- Nue's Exorcist †
- Nura: Rise of the Yokai Clan
- One Piece †
  - One Piece: Ace's Story
  - One Piece: Shokugeki no Sanji
- One-Punch Man †
- Otr of the Flame
- Our Blood Oath
- Phantom Busters †
- Phantom Seer
- Platinum End
- PPPPPP
- Pretty Face
- The Prince of Tennis
- The Promised Neverland
- Protect Me, Shugomaru!
- Psych House †
- Psyren
- Ral Grad
- Red Sprite
- The Right Way to Make Jump!
- Robot × LaserBeam
- Rosario + Vampire
  - Rosario + Vampire: Season II
- RuriDragon †
- Rurouni Kenshin
  - Rurouni Kenshin: Restoration
- Sakamoto Days †
  - Sakamoto Holidays †
- Samurai 8: The Tale of Hachimaru
- Sand Land
- School Judgment: Gakkyu Hotei
- Seraph of the End †
- Shadow Eliminators
- Shiba Inu Rooms †
- Shinobi Undercover †
- Shojo Null
- Show-ha Shoten!
- Slam Dunk
- Someone Hertz †
- Spy × Family †
- Stealth Symphony
- Super Psychic Policeman Chojo †
- Super Smartphone
- Syd Craft: Love Is a Mystery
- Takama-ga-hara
- Tatsuki Fujimoto Before Chainsaw Man: 17–21 and 22–26
- Teenage Renaissance! David
- Tegami Bachi
- Tenmaku Cinema
- Time Killers
- Time Paradox Ghostwriter
- Tista
- Tokyo Demon Bride Story
- Tokyo Shinobi Squad
- Toriko
- Twin Star Exorcists
- Two on Ice
- Ultimate Exorcist Kiyoshi †
- Ultimate Muscle
- Undead Unluck
- Under Doctor †
- Wanted! Eiichiro Oda Before One Piece
- Wāqwāq
- We Never Learn
- Whistle!
- Wild Strawberry
- Witch Watch †
- Witchriv †
- World Trigger †
- You and I Are Polar Opposites
- Yu-Gi-Oh!
- Yu-Gi-Oh! 5D's
- Yu-Gi-Oh! Arc-V
- Yu-Gi-Oh! Duelist
- Yu-Gi-Oh! GX
- Yu-Gi-Oh! Millennium World
- Yu-Gi-Oh! R
- Yu-Gi-Oh! Zexal
- Yui Kamio Lets Loose
- YuYu Hakusho
- Zipman!!
- Zombiepowder.

===== Shonen Sunday =====
- Akira Failing in Love †
- Albus Changes the World †
- Arata: The Legend ††
- Bus for Two †
- Call of the Night †
- Case Closed †
- Cross Game
- Fly Me to the Moon †
- Frieren: Beyond Journey's End †
- Gal x Gal Yuri †
- Hayate the Combat Butler †
- Helck
- Hyde & Closer
- I Wanna Do Bad Things with You
- I Want to End This Love Game †
- Inuyasha
- Itsuwaribito
- Kai-hen Wizards †
- Kekkaishi
- Komi Can't Communicate
- Kurozakuro
- Land of Monsters
- Magi: The Labyrinth of Magic
- Mao †
- Maoh: Juvenile Remix
- The Mortifying Ordeal of Being Seen †
- Parashoppers †
- Ranma ½
- Rin-ne
- Sleepy Princess in the Demon Castle †
- Tsumiki Ogami's Not-So-Ordinary Life †
- Yaiba †
- Yakitate!! Japan
- Yakuza vs. Cat †
- Yashahime: Princess Half-Demon

===== Studio Ghibli Library =====
- Baron: The Cat Returns
- Castle in the Sky (film comic)
- Howl's Moving Castle (film comic)
- Kiki's Delivery Service (film comic)
- My Neighbor Totoro (film comic)
- Nausicaä of the Valley of the Wind
- Ponyo (film comic)
- Princess Mononoke (film comic)
- Princess Mononoke: The First Story
- Spirited Away (film comic)
- The Secret World of Arrietty (film comic)

===== Viz Select =====
- AiON ††
- Calling You
- Chibi Vampire
- Chocolate Cosmos
- Clamp School Detectives
- Crazy For You
- D.N.Angel ††
- Duklyon: Clamp School Defenders
- Eureka Seven
- Fate/stay night ††
- Flower of the Deep Sleep
- Future Diary ††
- The Girl Who Leapt Through Time
- Girls Bravo
- Glass Wings
- Goth
- Grenadier
- Guardian Hearts ††
- Hanako and the Terror of Allegory
- Hands Off!
- Haru Hana
- Hibiki's Magic ††
- Judas
- Kamiyadori
- Kannazuki no Miko
- Kyo Kara Maoh! ††
- Lagoon Engine
- Lucky Star ††
- Mad Love Chase
- Man of Many Faces
- Metamo Kiss
- Mikansei No. 1
- Million Tears
- Miyuki-chan in Wonderland
- Momogumi Plus Senki ††
- Mouryou Kiden
- The One I Love
- Ratman ††
- Red Hot Chili Samurai ††
- Rizelmine
- Saber Marionette J
- Samurai Girl: Real Bout High School
- Saving Life ††
- Sgt. Frog ††
- Shirahime-Syo
- Someday's Dreamers
- St. Lunatic High School
- Suki: A Like Story
- The Third
- Trinity Blood
- Welcome to the N.H.K.
- ZONE-00 ††
- Zyword

===== Viz Signature =====
- 20th Century Boys
  - 21st Century Boys
- After God †
- Afterschool Charisma
- Alice in Borderland
  - Alice in Borderland Retry
- All My Darling Daughters
- The Apothecary Diaries: Maomao's Notes on the Inner Palace †
- Asadora! †
- Assassin's Creed: Blade of Shao Jun
- Assassin's Creed Shadows: Tales of Iga †
- Battle Royale: Angels' Border
  - Battle Royale: Enforcers †
- Beastars
- Beast Complex †
- Belladonna's Lover †
- Black Lagoon †
- Blue Flag
- Bokurano: Ours
- Boy's Abyss †
- Bug Ego †
- Came the Mirror & Other Tales
- Cat Eyed Boy
- Cats of the Louvre
- Centuria †
- Children of the Sea
- Children of the Whales
- Choujin X †
- The Climber †
- Cocoon
- Cosmos †
- Crazy Food Truck
- Dead Dead Demon's Dededede Destruction
- Dogsred †
- Dorohedoro
- Downfall
- #DRCL midnight children †
- The Drifting Classroom
- Drip Drip
- Fire Punch
- Fist of the North Star
- Fool Night †
- Gangsta †
- Gangsta: Cursed
- Gente
- GoGo Monster
- Golden Kamuy
- Golgo 13 ††
- Goodbye, Eri
- Goodnight Punpun
- Half Is More †
- Heart Gear
- Hell's Paradise: Jigokuraku
- Heroes †
- Hirayasumi †
- House of Five Leaves
- I'll Give It My All... Tomorrow
- Insomniacs After School
- Kingdom †
- The Kingdom of the Gods
- Kingyo Used Books ††
- La Quinta Camera
- Levius
  - Levius/est
- Look Back
- Magilumiere Magical Girls Inc. †
- Maid to Skate †
- Maison Ikkoku
- March Story
- Master Keaton
- Mermaid Saga
- Mermaid Scales and the Town of Sand
- Mobile Suit Gundam Thunderbolt †
- Monster
- Mujina Into the Deep †
- Mujirushi: The Sign of Dreams
- My Name Is Shingo
- No Guns Life
- No. 5
- Not Simple
- Oishinbo ††
- Ōoku: The Inner Chambers
- Orochi
- Phoenix
- Ping Pong
- Pluto
- Rai Rai Rai †
- Ran and the Gray World
- Real †
- Record of Ragnarok †
- Ristorante Paradiso
- Rooster Fighter †
- RWBY
  - RWBY: The Official Manga
  - RWBY: Official Manga Anthology
- Saturn Apartments
- Sins
- Sneeze: Naoki Urasawa Story Collection
- Snowball Earth †
- Solanin
- Sound of a Blink †
- Steel of the Celestial Shadows †
- Sunny
- Sweet Blue Flowers
- Taika's Reason †
- Takemitsu Zamurai †
- Takopi's Original Sin
- Tekkonkinkreet
- Tenjo Tenge
- Terra Formars †
- Tesoro
- To Strip the Flesh
- Tokyo Alien Bros.
- Tokyo Fears Rhapsody †
- Tokyo Ghoul
  - Tokyo Ghoul:re
- Tokyo These Days
- Trillion Game
- Ultraman †
- Until I Love Myself: The Journey of a Nonbinary Manga Artist
- Urusei Yatsura
- Vagabond †
- The Way of the Househusband †
- What a Wonderful World!
- Will I Be Single Forever?
- Witching Hour †
- Zom 100: Bucket List of the Dead †

====== Ito-verse ======
- Alley: Junji Ito Story Collection
- Black Paradox
- Deserter: Junji Ito Story Collection
- Fragments of Horror
- Frankenstein: Junji Ito Story Collection
- Gyo
- The Liminal Zone †
- Lovesickness: Junji Ito Story Collection
- Mimi's Tales of Terror
- Moan: Junji Ito Story Collection
- No Longer Human
- Remina
- Sensor
- Shiver: Junji Ito Selected Stories
- Smashed: Junji Ito Story Collection
- Soichi: Junji Ito Story Collection
- Statues: Junji Ito Story Collection
- Stitches
- Tombs: Junji Ito Story Collection
- Tomie
- Uzumaki
- Venus in the Blind Spot

† - New volumes currently being released

†† - Series not published in its entirety

††† - Yen Press has the rights to series' digital release due to being a Square Enix title.

==== Formerly licensed ====
- 2001 Nights
- A, A Prime
- A.D. Police: Dead End City
- Abara
- Act-Age (rescinded) ††
- Adolf (now licensed by Vertical)
- The All-New Tenchi Muyo!
- Aqua Knight
- Area 88 ††
- Ashen Victor
- Ayakashi Triangle (chapters 1–88 were released on the Shonen Jump app, volumes are licensed by Seven Seas Entertainment) ††
- B.B. Explosion
- B.O.D.Y. ††
- Baoh
- Bastard!! ††
- Battle Angel Alita (now licensed by Kodansha USA)
- Battle Angel Alita: Last Order (now licensed by Kodansha USA) ††
- Beet the Vandel Buster ††
- Benkei in New York
- Beyblade
- The Big O
- Bio Booster Armor Guyver ††
- Biomega
- Black Jack (now licensed by Vertical) ††
- Black Rose Alice ††
- Blood: The Last Vampire
- Blue Spring
- Cheeky Angel
- Chicago
- ChocoMimi ††
- Cobra ††
- Crimson Hero ††
- Crying Freeman (now licensed by Dark Horse Comics)
- Dance till Tomorrow
- Di Gi Charat
- Dinosaur King
- Dragon Drive
- Eagle: The Making of an Asian-American President
- Eat-Man ††
- El-Hazard
- Flowers & Bees
- Galaxy Express 999
- Getter Robo Go
- Ghost in the Shell 2: Innocence (film comic)
- Gimmick!
- Grey
- Haou Airen
- Haruka: Beyond the Stream of Time
- Homestuck ††
- Inubaka: Crazy for Dogs ††
- Kurohime ††
- The Legend of Kamui ††
- Legendz
- Macross II
- Magical Pokémon Journey ††
- Mai, the Psychic Girl
- Marionette Generation
- Medabots
- Midori Days
- Mobile Police Patlabor ††
- Mobile Suit Gundam 0079 ††
- Mobile Suit Gundam Wing
- Mobile Suit Gundam: The Origin (now licensed by Vertical) ††
- Monster Hunter: Flash Hunter
- Neko Majin ††
- No Need for Tenchi
- Ogre Slayer ††
- Pineapple Army ††
- Pokémon: The Electric Tale of Pikachu
- Project ARMS
- Promise (Keiko Nishi)
- RahXephon
- Read or Die
- Read or Dream
- Reborn! ††
- Resident Evil: The Marhawa Desire
- Rumic Theater ††
- Rumic World ††
- Rurouni Kenshin: Master of Flame
- Rurouni Kenshin: The Hokkaido Arc (rescinded) ††
- Saikano
- Samurai Crusader
- Sanctuary
- Sensual Phrase
- Shakugan no Shana ††
- Shaman King (now licensed by Kodansha USA)
- Short Cuts
- Short Program
- Silent Möbius (now licensed by Udon Entertainment)
- Socrates in Love
- SOS
- Spriggan (now licensed by Seven Seas Entertainment) ††
- Steam Detectives
- Strain
- Strawberry 100% ††
- They Were Eleven (now licensed by Denpa)
- Times Two
- Togari
- Tough ††
- Train Man: Densha Otoko
- Ultimo
- Voyeur ††
- Wedding Peach
- Wild Com.
- Wish
- Xenon
- Zatch Bell! ††
- Zoids: Chaotic Century
- Zoids: New Century

†† - Series not published in its entirety

=== Anime ===
==== Currently licensed ====
- 86 ††
- Accel World
- Accel World: Infinite Burst (film)
- Black Torch
- Bleach
- Bleach: Memories of Nobody (film)
- Bleach: The DiamondDust Rebellion (film)
- Bleach: Fade to Black (film)
- Bleach: Hell Verse (film)
- Bleach: Thousand-Year Blood War
- Blood Lad
- Boruto: Naruto Next Generations
- Burn the Witch (film) ††
- Buso Renkin
- Captain Tsubasa (2018)
- Castlevania ††
- Castlevania: Nocturne ††
- Chainsaw Man ††
- Coppelion
- Death Note
- Gargantia on the Verdurous Planet
- Genie Family 2020 †
- The God of High School ††
- Hikaru no Go
- Hirayasumi †
- Hunter × Hunter (2011)
- Hunter × Hunter: Phantom Rouge (film)
- Hunter × Hunter: The Last Mission (film)
- In/Spectre (first season only) ††
- Inuyasha
- Inuyasha: The Final Act
- Inuyasha the Movie: Affections Touching Across Time (film)
- Inuyasha the Movie: The Castle Beyond the Looking Glass (film)
- Inuyasha the Movie: Swords of an Honorable Ruler (film)
- Inuyasha the Movie: Fire on the Mystic Island (film)
- JoJo's Bizarre Adventure (originally licensed by Warner Bros.)
- JoJo's Bizarre Adventure: Stardust Crusaders
- JoJo's Bizarre Adventure: Diamond Is Unbreakable
- JoJo's Bizarre Adventure: Golden Wind
- JoJo's Bizarre Adventure: Stone Ocean ††
- Jujutsu Kaisen (first season only) ††
- Levius ††
- Mao
- Mr. Osomatsu (first and second seasons only)
- Naruto
- Naruto the Movie: Ninja Clash in the Land of Snow (film)
- Naruto the Movie: Legend of the Stone of Gelel (film)
- Naruto the Movie: Guardians of the Crescent Moon Kingdom (film)
- Naruto: Shippuden
- Naruto Shippuden the Movie (film)
- Naruto Shippuden the Movie 2: Bonds (film)
- Naruto Shippuden the Movie 3: The Will of Fire (film)
- Naruto Shippuden the Movie: The Lost Tower (film)
- Naruto the Movie: Blood Prison (film)
- Road to Ninja: Naruto the Movie (film)
- The Last: Naruto the Movie (film)
- Boruto: Naruto the Movie (film)
- Naruto SD: Rock Lee and his Ninja Pals
- Nura: Rise of the Yokai Clan
- Nura: Rise of the Yokai Clan - Demon Capital
- One-Punch Man
- Otaku Vampire's Love Bite †
- Pokémon: The Series
  - Pokémon: Indigo League ††
  - Pokémon: Adventures in the Orange Islands ††
  - Pokémon: The Johto Journeys ††
  - Pokémon: Johto League Champions ††
  - Pokémon: Master Quest ††
  - Pokémon: Advanced ††
  - Pokémon: Advanced Challenge ††
  - Pokémon: Advanced Battle ††
  - Pokémon: Battle Frontier ††
  - Pokémon: Diamond and Pearl ††
  - Pokémon: Diamond and Pearl: Battle Dimension ††
  - Pokémon: Diamond and Pearl: Galactic Battles ††
  - Pokémon: Diamond and Pearl: Sinnoh League Victors ††
  - Pokémon: Black & White ††
  - Pokémon: Black & White: Rival Destinies ††
  - Pokémon: Black & White: Adventures in Unova ††
  - Pokémon: Black & White: Adventures in Unova and Beyond ††
  - Pokémon the Series: XY ††
  - Pokémon the Series: XY Kalos Quest ††
  - Pokémon the Series: XYZ ††
  - Pokémon the Series: Sun & Moon ††
  - Pokémon the Series: Sun & Moon – Ultra Adventures ††
  - Pokémon the Series: Sun & Moon – Ultra Legends ††
  - Pokémon Journeys: The Series ††
  - Pokémon Master Journeys: The Series ††
  - Pokémon Ultimate Journeys: The Series ††
- Pokémon: The Movie
  - Pokémon: The First Movie (film; also licensed by Kids' WB) ††
  - Pokémon the Movie 2000 (film; also licensed by Kids' WB) ††
  - Pokémon 3: The Movie (film; also licensed by Kids' WB) ††
  - Pokémon 4Ever (film; originally licensed by Miramax) ††
  - Pokémon Heroes (film; originally licensed by Miramax) ††
  - Pokémon: Jirachi, Wish Maker (film; originally licensed by Miramax) ††
  - Pokémon: Destiny Deoxys (film; originally licensed by Miramax) ††
  - Pokémon: Lucario and the Mystery of Mew (film) ††
  - Pokémon Ranger and the Temple of the Sea (film) ††
  - Pokémon: The Rise of Darkrai (film) ††
  - Pokémon: Giratina & the Sky Warrior (film; originally licensed by Universal Studios Home Entertainment) ††
  - Pokémon: Arceus and the Jewel of Life (film) ††
  - Pokémon—Zoroark: Master of Illusions (film) ††
  - Pokémon the Movie: Black—Victini and Reshiram (film) ††
  - Pokémon the Movie: White—Victini and Zekrom (film) ††
  - Pokémon the Movie: Kyurem vs. the Sword of Justice (film) ††
  - Pokémon the Movie: Genesect and the Legend Awakened (film) ††
  - Pokémon the Movie: Diancie and the Cocoon of Destruction (film) ††
  - Pokémon the Movie: Hoopa and the Clash of Ages (film) ††
  - Pokémon the Movie: Volcanion and the Mechanical Marvel (film) ††
  - Pokémon the Movie: I Choose You! (film) ††
  - Pokémon the Movie: The Power of Us (film) ††
  - Pokémon: Mewtwo Strikes Back – Evolution (film) ††
  - Pokémon the Movie: Secrets of the Jungle (film) ††
- Ranma ½
- Ranma ½: Big Trouble in Nekonron, China (film)
- Ranma ½: Nihao My Concubine (film)
- Record of Ragnarok ††
- Rooster Fighter
- RWBY (originally owned by Warner Bros. Discovery's Rooster Teeth)
- RWBY Chibi (originally owned by Warner Bros. Discovery's Rooster Teeth)
- Sailor Moon (The first two seasons were originally licensed by DIC Entertainment and ADV Films, while the third and fourth seasons were originally licensed by Cloverway Inc. and Pioneer Entertainment)
- Sailor Moon Crystal
- Sailor Moon R: The Movie (film; originally licensed by Pioneer Entertainment)
- Sailor Moon S: The Movie (film; originally licensed by Pioneer Entertainment)
- Sailor Moon SuperS: The Movie (film; originally licensed by Pioneer Entertainment)
- Seis Manos
- Terra Formars
- Terra Formars: Revenge
- Thus Spoke Rohan Kishibe ††
- To Your Eternity ††
- Tokyo Revengers ††
- Tower of God (first season only) ††
- Undead Unluck ††
- Uzumaki ††
- Vampire Knight
- Vampire Knight: Guilty
- Yaiba: Samurai Legend
- Yashahime: Princess Half-Demon
- Zetman
- Zom 100: Bucket List of the Dead

† - Not currently dubbed or released outside of streaming

†† - Only has home video rights

==== Formerly licensed ====
- Adieu Galaxy Express 999 (film; now licensed by Discotek Media)
- Boys Over Flowers (now licensed by Discotek Media)
- Ceres, Celestial Legend (now licensed by Discotek Media)
- Corrector Yui
- Cross Game (streaming only)
- Bakuman (streaming only; originally licensed by Media Blasters)
- Berserk: The Golden Age Arc I: The Egg of the King (film)
- Berserk: The Golden Age Arc II - The Battle for Doldrey (film)
- Berserk: The Golden Age Arc III - The Advent (film)
- Blame! (film)
- Blue Dragon
- Blue Dragon: Trials of the Seven Shadows
- Deko Boko Friends
- Doraemon
- Eyeshield 21 (now licensed by Sentai Filmworks)
- Fatal Fury: Legend of the Hungry Wolf (film; now licensed by Discotek Media)
- Fatal Fury: The Motion Picture (film; now licensed by Discotek Media)
- Fatal Fury 2: The New Battle (film; now licensed by Discotek Media)
- Flame of Recca (now licensed by Discotek Media)
- Full Moon o Sagashite (now licensed by AnimEigo)
- Galaxy Express 999 (film; now licensed by Discotek Media)
- Grandpa Danger
- Great Dangaioh
- Grey: Digital Target
- Hamtaro
- Honey and Clover (now licensed by Discotek Media)
- Honey and Clover II (now licensed by Discotek Media)
- Hunter × Hunter (1999)
- I"s
- I"s Pure
- Infini-T Force
- Infini-T Force the Movie: Farewell, Friend (film)
- Jin-Roh (film; with Bandai Entertainment, now licensed by Discotek Media)
- K
- K: Missing Kings (film)
- K: Return of Kings
- K: Seven Stories (film)
- Kekkaishi (now licensed by Discotek Media)
- Key the Metal Idol (now licensed by Discotek Media)
- Lagrange: The Flower of Rin-ne
- Maison Ikkoku
- MÄR (First 52 episodes only)
- Mazinger Z: Infinity (film)
- Megalobox (first season only)
- MegaMan NT Warrior (First and Second (Axess) season only)
- Mega Man Star Force (First 13 episodes only)
- Mermaid's Scar
- Mirmo!
- Monster (now licensed by Discotek Media)
- Moribito: Guardian of the Spirit (now licensed by Sentai Filmworks, originally licensed by Geneon and later by Media Blasters)
- Nana (now licensed by Sentai Filmworks)
- Neuro: Supernatural Detective (streaming only)
- Night Warriors: Darkstalkers' Revenge (now licensed by Discotek Media)
- Ogre Slayer
- One-pound Gospel
- Please Save My Earth
- The Prince of Tennis (First 50 episodes only; now licensed by Crunchyroll)
- Professor Layton and the Eternal Diva (film; now licensed by Discotek Media)
- Project ARMS (now licensed by Discotek Media)
- Reborn! (streaming only; now licensed by Discotek Media)
- Saikano (now licensed by Sentai Filmworks)
- Sanctuary
- Strawberry 100% (streaming only)
- Tiger & Bunny (first season only)
- Tiger & Bunny: The Beginning (film)
- Tiger & Bunny: The Rising (film)
- Trouble Chocolate
- Ultra Maniac (Originally licensed by Geneon, now licensed by Discotek Media)
- Video Girl Ai
- Zatch Bell! (First 104 episodes only; now licensed by New Video)
- Zoids: Chaotic Century
- Zoids: Genesis

=== Live-action films ===
==== Currently licensed ====
- JoJo's Bizarre Adventure: Diamond Is Unbreakable Chapter I

==== Formerly licensed ====
- 20th Century Boys: Beginning of the End
- 20th Century Boys 2: The Last Hope
- 20th Century Boys 3: Redemption
- Death Note (now licensed by Crunchyroll)
- Death Note 2: The Last Name (now licensed by Crunchyroll)
- Densha Otoko
- Detroit Metal City
- Funky Forest: The First Contact
- Honey and Clover
- Kamikaze Girls
- L: Change the World
- Love*Com (now licensed by Discotek Media)
- Nana
- Nana 2
- Ping Pong

=== Novels ===
==== Currently licensed ====
===== Haikasoru =====
- All You Need Is Kill
- Apparitions
- Automatic Eve
- Battle Royale
- Belka, Why Don't You Bark?
- The Book of Heroes
- Brave Story
- The Cage of Zeus
- Dendera
- Dragon Sword and Wind Child
- The Future Is Japanese
- The Gate of Sorrows
- Gene Mapper
- Genocidal Organ
- Goth
- Hanzai Japan
- Harmony
- Ico: Castle in the Mist
- Legend of the Galactic Heroes
- The Lord of the Sands of Time
- Loups=Garous
- Mardock Scramble
- The Melancholy of Mechagirl
- Metal Gear Solid: Guns of the Patriot
- Mirror Sword and Shadow Prince
- MM9
- The Next Continent
- Noble V: Greylancer
- Orbital Cloud
- The Ouroboros Wave
- Phantasm Japan
- Red Girls
- Rocket Girls ††
- Self-Reference Engine
- Sisyphean
- Slum Online
- A Small Charred Face
- The Stories of Ibis
- Summer, Fireworks, and My Corpse
- Ten Billion Days and One Hundred Billion Nights
- The Thousand Year Beach
- Usurper of the Sun
- Yukikaze ††
- Zoo

===== Viz Media =====
- Ask Iwata
- BTS: Blood, Sweat & Tears
- The Creative Gene
  - The Gifted Gene: 70% of My Body Is Made of Movies
- Disney Twisted-Wonderland: Rose-Red Tyrant
- Disney Twisted-Wonderland: Usurper from the Wilds
- Fullmetal Alchemist
- Junji Ito: Dissection †
- King of Strong Style
- NieR:Automata: Long Story Short
  - NieR:Automata: Short Story Long
- Uncanny: The Origins of Fear

===== Shojo Beat =====
- Hot Gimmick S
- Vampire Knight: Fleeting Dreams

===== Shonen Jump =====
- Bleach: Can't Fear Your Own World
- Chainsaw Man: Buddy Stories
- Death Note: L Change the WorLd
- Death Note Another Note: The Los Angeles BB Murder Cases
- Demon Slayer: Kimetsu no Yaiba — The Flower of Happiness
- Demon Slayer: Kimetsu no Yaiba — One-Winged Butterfly
- Demon Slayer: Kimetsu no Yaiba — Signs from the Wind
- JoJo's Bizarre Adventure: Over Heaven
- JoJo's Bizarre Adventure: Purple Smoke Distortion
- Jujutsu Kaisen: Summer of Ashes, Autumn of Dust
- Jujutsu Kaisen: Thorny Road at Dawn
- Juni Taisen: Zodiac War
- Kaiju No. 8: Exclusive on the Third Division
- Manga in Theory and Practice
- My Hero Academia: School Briefs
- Naruto: Innocent Heart, Demonic Blood
- Naruto: Itachi's Story — Daylight
- Naruto: Itachi's Story — Midnight
- Naruto: Kakashi's Story — Lightning in the Frozen Sky
- Naruto: Kakashi's Story — The Sixth Hokage and the Failed Prince
- Naruto: Mission: Protect the Waterfall Village!
- Naruto: Naruto's Story — Family Day
- Naruto: Naruto's Story — Uzumaki Naruto and the Spiral Destiny
- Naruto: Sakura's Story — Love Riding on the Spring Breeze
- Naruto: Sasuke's Story — Star Pupil
- Naruto: Sasuke's Story — Sunrise
- Naruto: Sasuke's Story — The Uchiha and the Heavenly Stardust
- Naruto: Shikamaru's Story — A Cloud Drifting in the Silent Dark
- Naruto: Shikamaru's Story — Mourning Clouds
- One Piece: Ace's Story
- One Piece: Heroines
- One Piece: Law's Story
- The Shonen Jump Guide to Making Manga
- Spy × Family: Family Portrait
- Tokyo Ghoul: Days
- Tokyo Ghoul: Past
- Tokyo Ghoul: Void

===== Studio Ghibli Library =====
- Hayao Miyazaki Starting Point: 1979-1996
- Hayao Miyazaki Turning Point: 1997-2008
- My Neighbor Totoro: The Novel

†† - Series not published in its entirety

==== Formerly licensed ====
- Kamikaze Girls
- Mobile Suit Gundam
- Rurouni Kenshin: Voyage to the Moon World
- Shakugan no Shana ††
- Socrates in Love
- The Stationmaster
- Steamboy
- Winx Club ††
- Virus

†† - Series not published in its entirety

== Website ==
For a period, Viz offered an e-mail service called Viz Mail. In the first two weeks of service, it had 1,000 members. The service allowed users to use stationery and letterheads decorated with characters from Viz Media properties.

Despite the fact that Viz Media's licensed distribution territory includes Canada, the company has been criticized for not providing online anime simulcasts to that country.

== See also ==
- Crunchyroll EMEA, formerly known as Viz Media Europe
