= Rai Rai Rai =

Japanese manga series

- First tankōbon volume cover

雷雷雷
- Genre: Action; Science fiction comedy
- Manga
- Written by: Yoshiaki
- Published by: Shogakukan
- English publisher: NA: Viz Media
- Imprint: Ura Shōnen Sunday Comics
- Magazine: Ura Sunday; MangaONE
- Original run: August 18, 2023 – present
- Volumes: 7

Rai Rai Rai (雷雷雷; lit. 'Lightning Lightning Lightning') is a Japanese manga series written and illustrated by Yoshiaki. It began serialization in Shogakukan's Ura Sunday manga website and MangaONE app in August 2023.

== Plot ==
Rai Rai Rai takes place in a post apocalyptic future 50 years after an alien invasion has wiped out much of humanity, leaving monsters called varmints. Sumire Ichigaya, a young woman who works for a varmint-hunting company, is abducted by aliens and then ends up mutated, with an alien taking over her body. After the alien is defeated, Sumire is mutated in a way that allows her to transform into an alien while stressed, and then captured by the Raiden Corporation, who plans to use her to hunt varmints.

== Publication ==
Written and illustrated by Yoshiaki, Rai Rai Rai began serialization on Shogakukan's Ura Sunday manga website and MangaONE app on August 18, 2023. Its chapters were collected into seven tankōbon volumes as of August 2026.

In October 2024, Viz Media announced that they had licensed the series for English publication beginning in Q3 2025.

No.	Original release date	Original ISBN	English release date	English ISBN
1	November 17, 2023	978-4-09-853001-4	August 12, 2025	978-1-9747-5603-2
1. "Contact"; 2. "Unidentified"; 3. "Welcome to the Raiden Corporation"; Extras
2	April 18, 2024	978-4-09-853214-8	November 11, 2025	978-1-9747-5899-9
4. "Rising Sun"; 5. "Dancing Ninja"; 6. "Wonder Shrooms"; 7. "A Flash of Light"; 8. "Destroyer Cannon"; 9. "The Contaminated Zone"; 10. "Rai Rai Boom"
3	September 11, 2024	978-4-09-853587-3	February 10, 2026	978-1-9747-6126-5
11. "Re-Re-Action-Action"; 12. "Here Comes a New Challenger"; 13. "Koharu"; 14. "Controller"; 15. "Destroyer Cannon vs Destroyer Cannon"; 16. "Sumire Impact"; 17. "Big Sledge"; 18. "Grateful Days"
4	January 17, 2025	978-4-09-853802-7	May 12, 2026	978-1-9747-6294-1
19. "Clang Clang Zap Zap"; 20. "Boxed In"; 21. "Interlude"; 22. "Third Contact"; 23. "Chicken Party"; 24. "The Alien"; 25. "Concentrated Attack"; 26. "Impact"; Bonus Story
5	June 12, 2025	978-4-09-854146-1	August 11, 2026	978-1-9747-6295-8
27. "Cosmo"; 28. "Power Injection"; 29. "Cyclone! Hurricane! Dustbuster!"; 30. "New Alien"; 31. "Catch and Destroy"; 32. "Tripartite Meeting"; 33. "Indemitable"; 34. "Raucous Lightning"
6	January 9, 2026	978-4-09-854309-0	December 8, 2026	978-1-9747-6963-6
7	August 10, 2026	978-4-09-854732-6	—	—

== Reception ==
The series was nominated for the tenth Next Manga Awards in the web category in 2024. The series was ranked seventh in the 2025 edition of Takarajimasha's Kono Manga ga Sugoi! guidebook's list of the best manga for male readers. The series was also ranked twelfth in the Nationwide Bookstore Employees' Recommended Comics list of 2025. The series won the Rakuten Kobo Special Award at the 3rd Rakuten Kobo E-book Awards.
