= After God =

Japanese manga series

- First tankōbon volume cover

アフターゴッド (Afutā Goddo)
- Genre: Dark fantasy; Dystopian; Supernatural
- Manga
- Written by: Sumi Eno
- Published by: Shogakukan
- English publisher: NA: Comikey (digital); Viz Media
- Imprint: Ura Sunday Comics
- Magazine: MangaONE; Ura Sunday
- Original run: August 10, 2021 – present
- Volumes: 10
- icon

After God (Japanese: アフターゴッド, Hepburn: Afutā Goddo) is a Japanese web manga series written and illustrated by Sumi Eno. It has been serialized on Shogakukan's digital manga services MangaONE and Ura Sunday since August 2021.

== Plot ==
Set in 2021, several years after dangerous beings called gods made parts of Japan uninhabitable, the Anti-God Scientific Research Institute was established. The organization develops methods to engage with and eventually kill the gods, who are immune to conventional weapons and can hypnotize humans with their eyes. One day, an Institute researcher named Sachiyuki Tokinaga tries to prevent a teenage girl named Waka Kamikura from entering a dangerous area, only to learn that Waka has god-like eyes and powers. The Institute wants Waka to work for them by killing gods; while Waka already aimed to kill the gods because Shion, her only friend, had committed suicide by visiting a god, Tokinaga is concerned that the Institute wants to exploit her.

== Publication ==
Written and illustrated by Sumi Eno, After God started on Shogakukan's digital manga services MangaONE and Ura Sunday on August 10, 2021. The manga went on hiatus in July 2026 and, that same month, Eno announced that it had entered its final story arc. Shogakukan has collected its chapters into individual tankōbon volumes, with the first one released on December 10, 2021. As of November 19, 2025, ten volumes have been released.

In North America, the manga has been published digitally by Comikey since February 2022. In February 2024, Viz Media announced it had licensed the manga for English print release, with the first volume released on November 19 of the same year.

=== Volumes ===
| No. | Original release date | Original ISBN | English release date | English ISBN |
|---|---|---|---|---|
| 1 | December 10, 2021 | 978-4-09-850834-1 | November 19, 2024 | 978-1-9747-4970-6 |
| 2 | May 18, 2022 | 978-4-09-851112-9 | January 21, 2025 | 978-1-9747-5146-4 |
| 3 | October 19, 2022 | 978-4-09-851343-7 | March 18, 2025 | 978-1-9747-5204-1 |
| 4 | March 17, 2023 | 978-4-09-851753-4 | May 20, 2025 | 978-1-9747-5479-3 |
| 5 | August 9, 2023 | 978-4-09-852669-7 | July 15, 2025 | 978-1-9747-5524-0 |
| 6 | January 12, 2024 | 978-4-09-853088-5 | September 16, 2025 | 978-1-9747-5830-2 |
| 7 | June 19, 2024 | 978-4-09-853389-3 | November 18, 2025 | 978-1-9747-5878-4 |
| 8 | November 19, 2024 | 978-4-09-853704-4 | January 20, 2026 | 978-1-9747-6162-3 |
| 9 | April 17, 2025 | 978-4-09-854068-6 | March 17, 2026 | 978-1-9747-6163-0 |
| 10 | November 19, 2025 | 978-4-09-854313-7 | November 17, 2026 | 978-1-9747-6863-9 |

== Reception ==
The series was ranked eighth for the ninth Next Manga Award in the web category in 2023.
