= Shinobi Undercover =

Japanese manga series

- First tankōbon volume cover

しのびごと (Shinobigoto)
- Genre: Action; Comedy
- Manga
- Written by: Ippon Takegushi
- Illustrated by: Santa Mitarashi
- Published by: Shueisha
- English publisher: NA: Viz Media
- Imprint: Jump Comics
- Magazine: Weekly Shōnen Jump
- Original run: September 17, 2024 – present
- Volumes: 10
- icon

Shinobi Undercover (Japanese: しのびごと, Hepburn: Shinobigoto) is a Japanese manga series written by Ippon Takegushi and illustrated by Santa Mitarashi. It began serialization in Shueisha's Weekly Shōnen Jump magazine in September 2024, with its chapters collected in ten volumes as of November 2026.

== Plot ==
Yodaka is an extremely skilled shinobi who suffers from severe social anxiety. He is assigned to protect a clumsy high school student, Aoi Mukai, who is being targeted by fugitive shinobi.

Yodaka must work to protect Aoi and overcome his poor social skills in order to give her the best high school student life.

== Characters ==
Each code name is derived from a different species of bird. NPSF squads labeled with a lower number are judged to have better abilities, with single-digit squads being especially elite. Squad No. 1 is formed on an as-needed basis from other squads and has no permanent members.^{[ch. 93]} A ninja usually has a Kekkai (血界, chi-kai), which is hereditary ability that grants them superhuman powers. Regardless of lineage, a user must awaken their kekkai to use it.

Elite ninja squads
Position Squad		Ace	Others		
2	Code name	Inuwashi (イヌワシ)	?		
2	Family	Shiranagi	?		
2	Kekkai	?	?		
3	Code name	Fukuro (ふくろう)	?		
3	Family	Kuryu	?		
3	Kekkai	?	?		
4	Code name	Yamagara (ヤマガラ)	Uguisu (ウグイス)	?	
4	Family	Jibashiri	?	?	
4	Kekkai	?	?	?	
5	Code name	Kohakucho (コハクチョウ)	?		
5	Family	Adashino	?		
5	Kekkai	?	?		
6	Code name	Hayabusa (ハヤブサ)	Mukudori (ムクドリ)	Shime (シメ)	Enaga (エナガ)
6	Family	Izuchi	Kamuro	?	?
6	Kekkai	"Generator"	"Oilfire"	(tongue)	(air blast)
7	Code name	Kasasagi (カササギ)	Buncho (ブンチョウ)	Mugimaki (ムギマキ)	Atori (アトリ)
7	Family	Uzen	?	?	?
7	Kekkai	(bubbles)	"Steel Scales"	"Steam Plume"	"Drunkfume"
8	Code name	Uzura (ウズラ)	?		
8	Family	Nazumi	?		
8	Kekkai	?	?		
9	Code name	Yodaka (ヨダカ)	Hibari (ヒバリ)	Umineko (ウミネコ)	Suzume (スズメ)
9	Family	?	(fugitive)	Kamuro	?
9	Kekkai	—N/a	?	"Oilfire"	"Flexiform"

=== Ninja Public Security Force ===
==== Squad 9 ====
Yodaka (ヨダカ; Night Jar)
Alias Yu Nozuki. Ace of squad no. 9. Yodaka does not come from a ninja family, so he does not possess kekkai.^{[ch. 19]}
Hibari (ヒバリ; Skylark)
Alias Kana Fujimiya. Squad No. 9. Hibari comes from a family of fugitive ninja.^{[ch. 35]}
Umineko (ウミネコ; Gull)
Alias Taki Utsumi. Squad No. 9. "Oilfire". Specifically described as the "family failure" for being born without kekkai,^{[ch. 35]} but his kekkai "Oilfire" awakens late, an exceedingly rare occurrence.^{[ch. 64]}
Suzume (スズメ; Sparrow)
Alias Makoto Yuki. Squad No. 9. Her kekkai "Flexiform" allows her to painlessly dislocate her joints and enhances elasticity. Suzume was disinherited by her family. She has a hidden ability to extrude bony spikes from her body.

==== Squad 6 ====
Hayabusa (ハヤブサ; Peregrine falcon)
Alias Hayami. Ace of Squad No. 6. His kekkai "Generator" applies an electric shock to physical strikes. He belongs to the Izuchi Family, one of the Eight Great Families.
Mukudori (ムクドリ; Starling)
Squad No. 6. Kekkai "Oilfire" produces flammable oil. Umineko's older sister; they belong to the Kamuro family,^{[ch. 39]} which is one of the Eight Great Families.
Shime (シメ; Hawfinch)
Squad No. 6. Kekkai is Enlongated tongue.
Enaga (エナガ; Long-tailed tit)
Squad No. 6. Kekkai is Blasting inhaled air.

==== Squad 7 ====
Kasasagi (カササギ; European magpie)
Ace of Squad No. 7. Kekkai is sticky bubbles. Member of the Uzen Family, one of the Eight Great Families.
Buncho (ブンチョウ; Java sparrow)
Squad No. 7. Kekkai is "Steel scales" armored skin.
Mugimaki (ムギマキ; Flycatcher)
Squad No. 7. "Steam Plume" kekkai allows her to vaporize her body's water to generate steam clouds.
Atori (アトリ; Brambling)
Squad No. 7. Kekkai "Drunkfume" emits a poison gas which inebriates their opponents.

==== Other squads ====
Mimizuku (ミミズク; Horned owl)
Alias Usami. Formerly a member of Squad No. 1.^{[ch. 29]} He serves as Aoi's driver and guardian as part of his duties as the custodian of Amamori. Mimizuke stated his kekkai is not suited for offense, so his family have been passing down the Six Arts of Capture to counter kekkai users:^{[ch. 41]} Cup Piercer; Unwavering Moon; Engraving of the Deer Crest; Frog Seamstress; Phoenix Maelstrom; Boar-Hearted Charge.^{[ch. 50]}
Kogera (コゲラ; Pygmy woodpecker)
Squad No. 18.
Hiyo (ひよ; Chick)
Squad No. 18.
Inuwashi (イヌワシ; Golden eagle)
Ace of Squad No. 2. Head of the Shiranagi Family, one of the Eight Great Families.
Fukuro (ふくろう; Owl)
Ace of Squad No. 3. Head of the Kuryu Family, one of the Eight Great Families. She calls herself "the ideal ninja".
Yamagara (ヤマガラ; Varied tit)
Ace of Squad No. 4. Head of the Jibashiri Family, one of the Eight Great Families.
Uguisu (ウグイス; Japanese nightingale)
Member of Squad No. 4. She dances to express her gratitude.
Kohakucho (コハクチョウ; Tundra swan)
Ace of Squad No. 5. Head of the Adashino Family, one of the Eight Great Families.
Kijibato (キジバト; Oriental turtle dove)
Ex-ace of Squad No. 2. Head of the Nazumi Family, one of the Eight Great Families. He currently leads the NPSF Training Center and is a living legend. His kekkai is "Whirlwind", which lets him draw air into his hands and discharge it at high speed.
Karigane (雁; Wild goose)
Ace of Squad No. 10. She is arrogant.
Akakokko (アカコッコ; Izu thrush)
A clumsy, self-deprecating member of Squad No. 11.

=== Fugitive Ninja ===
Tsubame (ツバメ; Swallow)
Alias "Miyake", a bullied first-year student in the Soccer Club.^{[ch. 4]} Mistranslated as "sparrow".^{[ch. 8]}
Hachikuma (ハチクマ; Crested honey buzzard)
Tobi (トビ; Kite)
Kekkai is enhanced hearing.
Ban (バン; Moorhen)
Kekkai "Toxiflesh" imbues sweat and blood with poison.
Kawasemi (カワセミ; Kingfisher)
Kekkai allows him to gain super strength and his flesh to turn red. He became Aoi's big brother after she was orphaned,^{[ch. 99]} as she has no known living relatives.^{[ch. 27]}
Konoha (コノハ; Scops owl)
Kekkai "Amalgaliquid" controls any liquid mixed with his blood. Hibari calls him a lousy excuse of a brother.^{[ch. 46]}
Ikaru (イカル; Grosbeak)
Kekkai "Dancing Hair" allows hair manipulation.
Hojiro (ホオジロ; Bunting)
Kekkai allows enhanced healing rate and strength gain from injuries. Later captured by Squad No. 9 and subjected to experimentation by Fukuro.
Mozu (モズ; Shrike)
Kekkai "Stone Skin" hardens skin surface.
Karasu (カラス; Crow)
Kekkai "Vibrotex" manipulates vibrations. Former ace of Squad No. 1 prior to becoming a fugitive.^{[ch. 55]}
Sazanqua
Kekkai "Carciflora" allows him to manipulate thorny vines.
Yuzu
Kekkai "Gear Shift"

=== Hakoniwa family ===
The Hakoniwas are a yakuza-like family of ninja who worked directly under Edo-era shoguns; they refused to join the other families to form the NPSF and have remained independent.

Boko Hakoniwa
The heir of the family
Ryunosuke Nejimaki
The captain of the family
Sakaki
Number 100 of the Narehate, a criminal organization of 100 allied with the Hakoniwa family.

== Publication ==
Written by Ippon Takegushi and illustrated by Santa Mitarashi, the series began serialization in Shueisha's Weekly Shōnen Jump magazine on September 17, 2024. As of November 2026, the series' individual chapters have been collected into ten tankōbon volumes.

Viz Media and Manga Plus are publishing the series in English simultaneously with its Japanese release.

Three animated manga shorts were posted on the Weekly Shōnen Jump YouTube channel in December 2024.

=== Volumes ===
No.	Original release date	Original ISBN	English release date	English ISBN
1	January 4, 2025	978-4-08-884401-5	June 2, 2026	978-1-9747-5776-3
1. "A Ninja's Work" (忍者の仕事, Ninja no Shigoto); 2. "Yodaka's Work" (ヨダカの仕事, Yodaka no Shigoto); 3. "Teamwork" (チームプレー, Chīmupurē); 4. "The Joy of Clubs" (部活の醍醐味, Bukatsu no Daigomi); 5. "Hibari's Struggle" (ヒバリの悩み, Hibari no Nayami); 6. "Hibari's Location" (ヒバリのいる場所, Hibari no iru Basho); 7. "As a Ninja" (忍者として, Ninja to Shite)
The state-sanctioned Ninja Public Security Force (NPSF) are a clandestine group which remove threats to the nation's peace. One young elite shinobi with the codename Yodaka (ヨダカ), who has crippling social anxiety, is assigned to be the bodyguard of physically clumsy high school student Aoi Mukai, under the assumed identity of a fellow first-year student, alias Yu Nozuki; he stays in constant contact with NPSF Operator No. 9 through a bird-shaped earpiece. By returning a charm she dropped while exiting her limousine, he is the first to spark a friendship with Aoi, despite the presence of two NPSF ninja assigned to become Aoi's best friend: alias Kana Fujimiya, codename Hibari (ヒバリ); and Aoi's future boyfriend: alias Taki Utsumi, codename Umineko (ウミネコ). Over the course of the first few days, Aoi defends Yodaka from bullies and he foils several assassination attempts, including one that takes place before the entrance ceremony, another during after-school karaoke, and yet another carried out by Miyake, a renegade ninja who they saved from bullies in the soccer club, with help from Hibari.
2	March 4, 2025	978-4-08-884414-5	August 4, 2026	978-1-9747-6482-2
8. "The Two After School" (放課後の2人, Hōkago no 2-Ri); 9. "Umineko's Shopping" (ウミネコのショッピング, Umineko no shoppingu); 10. "What the Two Look Forward To" (2人の楽しみ, 2-Ri no Tanoshimi); 11. "Tangling Threads!" (絡む糸!, Karamu Ito!); 12. "Mimizuku's Mission" (ミミズクの任務, Mimizuku no Ninmu); 13. "Make More Friends" (友達増やせ, Tomodachi Fuyase); 14. "Mission at School Camp" (林間学校の任務, Rinkan Gakkō no Ninmu); 15. "The Ninja Ghost" (忍者のお化け, Ninja no Obake); 16. "A Ninja's Sign" (忍者の印, Ninja no Shirushi)
As Hibari recuperates, they learn more about Miyake's background. Yodaka's relationship with Aoi solidifies into friendship. For the upcoming sports festival, Umineko is paired with Aoi for a mixed-gender three-legged race; to prepare, Umineko and Aoi go shopping for decorations at a mall with Yodaka trailing them discreetly. Renegade ninja Hachikuma (ハチクマ) attacks Aoi, but Yodaka and Umineko fend him off, with Umineko breaking his leg, forcing Yodaka into the three-legged race. In a flashback, Usami (another NPSF member, aka Mimizuku, serving as Aoi's driver and guardian) explains they have a new direction from NPSF to allow Aoi to participate in typical high school events, hoping to draw out the renegades. After Aoi decides to expand their friend group, Umineko and Hibari take advantage, causing Yodaka needlessly to worry about being replaced; Operator No. 9 suggests that he should fill the boyfriend role instead. On a school camping trip, Yodaka and Aoi are attacked by Tobi during a haunted walk event; once Hibari and Umineko take over protecting Aoi, Yodaka handily defeats Tobi.
3	June 4, 2025	978-4-08-884556-2	October 6, 2026	978-1-9747-1658-6
17. "The Day the Bone Broke" (骨の折れた日, Hone no Oreta hi); 18. "Precious Little Birdies" (可愛い小鳥, Kawaii Kotori); 19. "Suzume's Feelings" (スズメの気持ち, Suzume no Kimochi); 20. "Going Home in the Rain" (雨の帰り道, Ame no Kaerimichi); 21. "Squad No. 9" (9号部隊, 9 Gō Butai); 22. "A Boss from Hell" (般若の上司, Han'nya no jōshi); 23. "Lost Contact" (通信不能, Tsūshin Funō); 24. "Red Kawasemi" (赤いカワセミ, Akai Kawasemi); 25. "Looks Great on You" (あなたにお似合い, Anata ni Oniai)
Yodaka is confused by his growing feelings for Aoi. Class 2 has another undercover NPSF agent, codename Suzume, who proposes to take over as a super-handsome love interest; after sparring, Yodaka renews his determination to succeed. Walking home together in the rain, Yodaka retrieves Aoi's class identification card and learns her birthday is in three days, giving him a new personal mission. Hachikuma says the secretive organization used a large coastal warehouse, and the team infiltrate the premises to learn more information, where they are confronted by two renegades, codename Ban, wearing an oni mask, and codename Kawasemi, wielding an axe. Kawasemi threatens the other members of Squad No. 9 in an attempt to get Yodaka to join, but Yodaka repeats the instructions he was given: each NPSF member should handle their own situation. After Hibari defeats Ban, they team up to beat Kawasemi.
4	September 4, 2025	978-4-08-884655-2	December 1, 2026	978-1-9747-6657-4
26. "That's All!" (それだけ!, Sore Dake!); 27. "Aoi's Birthday" (アオイは誕生日, Aoi wa Tanjōbi); 28. "Special Dinner Table" (特別な食卓, Tokubetsuna Shokutaku); 29. "Invaders of Amamori" (天守の侵入者, Tenshu no Shin'nyū-sha); 30. "Please Teach Me" (教えてください, Oshietekudasai); 31. "Kinda at the Beach" (なんか海, Nanka Umi); 32. "Squad No. 6" (6号部隊, 6 Gō Butai); 33. "The Croquettes Are Good" (コロッケうまい, Korokke Umai); 34. "On Guard" (油断禁物, Shinobu Yudan Kinmotsu)
Although Kawasemi escapes, the squad retrieves records leading to more fugitive ninja. Yodaka's first choice present is rejected by Hibari and he gives Aoi a backup instead; Mimizuku invites him to dinner at the Amamori apartments to celebrate her birthday. Afterward, Mimizuku tells Yodaka NPSF is considering replacing Squad No. 9 as Aoi's bodyguards because his feelings have become distracting, but Mimizuku makes plans to train Yodaka. To start, Mimizuku instructs Yodaka to defeat intruders without spilling a glass of tea. When end of term grades come out, Aoi avoids going to remedial classes with tutoring by Squad 9, and Mimizuku suggests a trip to the beach, where he reflects on the parallels between Aoi's father, a ninja assigned to guard Aoi's mother, and Yodaka. There, they meet and compete with Squad No. 6, who NPSF have advanced as candidates to take over from Squad 9, in a ninja battle royale with other squads.
5	November 4, 2025	978-4-08-884743-6	February 2, 2027	978-1-9747-6854-7
35. "Battle of the Ninja Arts" (忍法勝負, Ninpō Shōbu); 36. "Hayabusa's Kekkai" (ハヤブサの血界, Hayabusa no Chi-kai); 37. "Three Against Two" (3対2, 3 Tai 2); 38. "Buying Time" (時間を稼げ, Jikan o Kasege); 39. "A Good Ninja" (いい忍者, Ī Ninja); 40. "Priority Order" (優先順位, Yūsen Jun'i); 41. "Natural Gift" (天才, Tensai); 42. "Big Sister, Little Brother" (姉と弟, Ane to Otōto); 43. "I Want to Join You" (隣に行きたい, Tonari ni Ikitai)
In the battle royale between eight squads, each ninja carries a wooden tag representing their life; if it is broken, that individual is out of the exercise. In addition, each squad is assigned a wooden tag with red markings which disqualifies all members when broken; the squad breaking the red tag receives a point. Squads 6 and 9 establish themselves as the early favorites, each eliminating three squads; when they clash, Yodaka delays Squad 6 and eliminates Shime. Hayabusa sends Mukudori (Umineko's older sister) and Enaga to take Squad 9's red tag, which they assume (wrongly) is held by Suzume, who breaks Enaga's individual tag. Mimizuku had advised Squad 9 to run, buying enough time for Yodaka to defeat Hayabusa, who is carrying the Squad 6 red tag; while the aces fight, Mukudori eliminates Hibari and Suzume. Yodaka has learned a new skill from Mimizuku: he metaphorically sets aside his feelings to maintain focus and priority. Yodaka prevails, breaking the Squad 6 red tag, and Umineko finally stands up to his older sister, but Hayabusa unlocks a new fear for Yodaka, telling him to invite Aoi to a summer festival which will start in two days.
6	January 5, 2026	978-4-08-884813-6	—	—
44. "Summer Isn't Over Yet" (夏は終わらない, Natsu wa owaranai); 45. "The Tower of Anxiety" (不安の塔, Fuan no Tō); 46. "Attack" (急襲, Kyūshū); 47. "The Toppling Tower" (崩れる塔, Kuzureru Tō); 48. "Punch" (殴る, Naguru); 49. "Yodaka, All Alone" (独りのヨダカ, Hitori no Yodaka); 50. "Mimizuku's Roost" (ミミズクの巣, Mimizuku no Su); 51. "Useless Struggle" (悪あがき, Waruagaki)
At the festival, Yodaka realizes he has a crush on Aoi. Hayabusa asks what Yodaka would do if NPSF asked him to step aside from protecting Aoi. A group of fugitive ninja strike Squad 9, leaving one fugitive, Hojiro, to take care of Yodaka as another, Konoha, leaves with Aoi. Yodaka's deferred emotions overload; because he was an orphan, NPSF treated him as expendable and he regresses into instinctive actions without considering his own safety. As Hojiro, the former ace of Squad 5, starts to overwhelm Yodaka, Mimizuku arrives and defeats Hojiro. Konoha and Tobi take blood samples from Aoi; Umineko springs into action, delaying the fugitives long enough for Mimizuku and Squad 9 to catch up; Hibari retrieves Aoi and Squad 6's Mukudori and Hayabusa, acting without authorization, engage Konoha and Tobi, respectively.
7	March 4, 2026	978-4-08-884898-3	—	—
52. "A Watched Back" (見る背中, Miru Senaka); 53. "Awakened Blood" (目覚める血, Mezameru Chi); 54. "The Nothing Ninja" (空っぽの忍者, Karappo no Ninja); 55. "Blackbird" (黒い鳥, Kuroi Tori); 56. "The End of Summer" (夏の終わり, Natsu no Owari); 57. "Amamori's Underground Training Facility" (天守地下訓練場, Tenshu Chika Kunren-ba); 58. "A Marriage Negotiation?" (お見合い?, Omiai?); 59. "Where Yodaka Belongs" (ヨダカの居場所, Yodaka no Ibasho); 60. "Squad No. 7" (7号部隊, 7 Gōbutai)
Tobi falls and Umineko sends Hibari back with Aoi to Yodaka. Hayabusa and Mukudori are renegade, fighting against Konoha, who overcomes them after eating Mukai blood, leaving prominent, blackened veins on his skin. He then catches up with Hibari and takes out Mimizuku, but Yodaka rises and knocks him away, then Yodaka is caught by Karasu, the fugitive ex-ace of Squad No. 1. Karasu escapes as Yodaka passes out. The fugitive ninja discover Aoi's blood has the same kekkai-enhancing power as her mother's. Two weeks later, Yodaka wakes up and visits Aoi's apartment, where he inadvertently confesses his love and she mishears him, but Operator 9 and Mimizuku do not. Yodaka faces a new potential fiancée, Kasasagi, the ace of Squad No. 7, who is posing undercover as their student teacher; should he accept her proposal, he would join Squad 7. She jokes he would reject her only if he has a crush on someone else; his pause tells her she inadvertently found the truth. Kasasagi's jealousy leads to a training session between squads 9 and 7; Kasasagi takes Yodaka away to spar solo, saying his team is weak, but they show determined resilience against the others in Squad 7. Kasasagi had instructed Squad 7 to pass no one from Squad 9, but they earn the respect of 7. Buncho tries to coach 9 to awaken their kekkai. Kasasagi's training left Yodaka unconscious.
8	June 4, 2026	978-4-08-885088-7	—	—
61. "Kasasagi's Mission" (カササギの任務, Kasasagi no Ninmu); 62. "Start of Mission" (任務開始, Ninmu Kaishi); 63. "Arrival" (到着, Tōchaku); 64. "Burn, Umineko" (燃えよウミネコ, Moeyo Umineko); 65. "Splayed out on the Riverbank" (川辺で寝そべって, Kawabe de Nesobette); 66. "Mission: Infiltrate the Uzen Family!" (右旋家潜入任務!, Usen-ka Sen'nyū Ninmu!); 67. "Treasure Hunt" (宝探し, Takarasagashi); 68. "Absent Aces" (エースの不在, Ēsu no Fuzai); 69. "What I Can Do" (自分にできること, Jibun ni Dekiru Koto)
Kasasagi is recalled to the Uzen family home, where fugitive ninja Kawasemi gives her a mission to capture Aoi. Kasasagi is an orphan who owes a debt to the Uzen family, and agrees despite having grown close to Yodaka and Squad 9. She isolates Aoi and forces Yodaka to follow at a distance, but he uses Aoi's trackers, defending both from the fugitives; she stabs him in the back with a bubble lance. Umineko arrives wielding his newly awakened kekkai, a duplicate of Mukudori's "Oilfire"; his bag of flour rips open and detonates during the fight with Kasasagi; Yodaka carries all three out of the confined space. Kasasagi half-heartedly tries to fight, but Yodaka says he knows she wants to lose, and Mugimaki takes her into custody. Operator 9 tells Yodaka the Uzens are one of eight families that control the NPSF and reveals a risky plan to rescue Kasasagi. After five days, Squad 9 infiltrates the Uzen compound. When Squad 9 is discovered, Yodaka splits off and enters the Uzen basement netherhold to search for evidence while the rest face off with Squad 7. The Uzen patriarch authorizes deadly force and requests backup from the NPSF. Squad 9, led by Suzume, proves to be a match for Squad 7, so Squad 7 attempts to divide and conquer, pairing off against Squad 9 individually. Umineko fights Mugimaki, whose kekkai uses steam to conceal her attacks; however, Umineko gains an advantage through his long-practiced multitasking.
9	September 4, 2026	978-4-08-885179-2	—	—
70. "Resident of the Underground" (地下の住人, Chika no Jūnin); 71. "Big Idiot" (大馬鹿野郎, Ōbaka Yarō); 72. "Let's Go to the Comms Room!" (通信室に行こう!, Tsūshin-Shitsu ni Ikou!); 73. "Child of the Netherhold" (異界牢の迷子, Ikai rō no Maigo); 74. "Fight Beyond that Door" (扉の向こうの攻防, Tobira no Mukō no Kōbō); 75. "Division of Roles" (役割分担, Yakuwari Buntan); 76. "From the Depths of the Earth" (地の底から, Ji no Soko Kara); 77. "Partings and Awakenings" (別れと目覚め, Wakare to Mezame); 78. "Where Kasasagi Belongs" (カササギの居場所, Kasasagi no Ibasho)
Umineko and Suzume prevail while Hibari keeps fighting Buncho. The Uzen patriarch flexes his primal "black mud" kekkai, powered by Mukai blood, and directs Squad 7 to dispose of Squad 9. Yodaka holds an internal dialogue with an imaginary substitute Op and finds the last prisoner of the Netherhold, insane Uzen heir Yoichi, who helpfully guides him to the comms room, but they fight over an social mistake while Yodaka copies data from the computer. Child prodigy Yoichi murdered his mother for being a "traitor" and was exiled to the basement by his father. Yodaka's fight with Yoichi causes the Netherhold to collapse, and they both escape. Uzen begins overwhelming Squad 9. With Kasasagi's help, Umineko and Hibari overwhelm Uzen, but the tide shifts against them when Yoichi emerges, stealing his father's power. When he arrives, Yodaka hits Yoichi with Cup Piercer, causing Yoichi to succumb to the primal black mud; Kasasagi reunites with her Squad 7 teammates and they prepare to take on Yoichi.
10	November 4, 2026	978-4-08-885237-9	—	—
79. "Bubble Kagura" (泡神楽, Awa Kagura); 80. "A Gift for You" (君への贈り物, Kimi e no Okurimono); 81. "Where Do I Go?" (何処へ行く?, Doko e Iku?); 82. "Evolution" (進化, Shinka); 83. "The Next Problem" (次の問題, Tsugi no Mondai); 84. "The Octollection" (八家蒐集, Hachi-ka Shūshū); 85. "Objection!" (異議あり!, Igiari!); 86. "Talking to Myself" (独り言, Hitorigoto); 87. "An Unforseen [sic] and Formidable Rival" (想定外の強敵, Sōtei-gai no Tomo)
Yodaka insists on saving the Uzen heir, seeing parallels with his loneliness. The two squads join to free Yoichi, and Yodaka invites him to the school's culture festival. Weakened by their fight, the Netherhold collapses and Kawasemi mortally wounds Yoichi, who pushes Yodaka out just before the estate collapses. Op 9 thanks Yoichi and the mission ends; some of the black mold has survived and adopts Yodaka. Because the Uzen family has resisted its punishment (disbandment), Inuwashi takes Yodaka to a meeting of the heads of the Eight Families. Eventually, Mimizuku persuades them Yodaka will lead the Mukai family if he marries Aoi, and they would incorporate the Uzens. As the first mission of love, Mimizuku tells Yodaka ask Aoi to the upcoming Culture Festival dance. The two elected Miss and Mister Kazama High will be paired for that dance. When Yodaka advances his candidacy for Mr. Kazama, it is rejected. However, both Hibari and Aoi enter the competition for Miss Kazama; Hibari relies on manufactured cuteness while Aoi's straightforward competitiveness gives her an early lead.

=== Chapters not yet collected ===
The following chapters have not yet been collected into tankobon format:

88. "Hibari's Path to Victory" (ヒバリの勝ち筋, Hibari no Kachi-kin)
89. "Yodaka's Mentor?" (ヨダカの師匠?, Yodaka no Shishō?)
90. "Their Trial" (二人の試練, Futari no Shiren)
91. "The Fated Day" (運命の日, Unmei no hi)
92. "The Expanding Dilemma" (広がる苦境, Hirogaro Kukyō)
93. "Legend Among Ninja" (伝説の忍者, Densetsu no Ninja)
94. "Enhanced Humans" (強化人間, Kyōka Ningen)
95. "Everyone Has Secrets" (秘密は誰にでも, Himitsu wa Darenidemo)
96. "Top-Squad Aces" (上位部隊エース, Jōi Butai Ēsu)
97. "Teacher and Students" (師匠と弟子, Shishō to Deshi)
98. "Bonds that Tie" (繋がる絆, Tsunagaru Kizuna)
99. "The Move" (その技, Sono Waza)
100. "A Special Time" (特別な時間, Tokubetsu na Jikan)
101. "The Results" (結果発表, Kekka Happyō)
102. "The Perfect Couple" (2人はただのお似合い, Futari wa Tada no Oniai)
103. "Liar" (嘘つき, Usotsuki)
104. "The Gathered" (集結する者, Shūketsu suru Mono)
105. "Shuffled Teams" (シャッフルチーム, Shaffuru Chīmu)
106. "Duel" (タイマン勝負, Taiman Shōbu)

== Reception ==
The series has been recommended by manga creators Shūichi Asō and Yūto Tsukuda. It was nominated for the 11th Next Manga Award in the print category in 2025, and was ranked eighth.

J.R. Waugh of Screen Rant described the manga as "an authentic yet modern twist on ninja-themed manga" and recommended it to fans of Naruto.

== See also ==
- Candy Flurry, another manga by the same creators
