= Just Listen to the Song =

Japanese manga by Tatsuki Fujimoto and Oto Toda

フツーに聞いてくれ (Futsū ni Kiitekure)
- Genre: Cringe comedy; Mystery; Romance
- Manga
- Written by: Tatsuki Fujimoto
- Illustrated by: Oto Toda
- Published by: Shueisha
- English publisher: NA: Viz Media
- Magazine: Shōnen Jump+
- Published: July 4, 2022
- icon

Just Listen to the Song (Japanese: フツーに聞いてくれ, Hepburn: Futsū ni Kiitekure; 'Listen to Me Normally') is a Japanese one-shot web manga written by Tatsuki Fujimoto and illustrated by Oto Toda. It was released on the Shōnen Jump+ website in July 2022.

== Plot ==
A student uploads a song to YouTube as a confession of his crush on a girl in his class, but when he returns to school the next day, he is rejected by her after she has shared the song with their classmates over LINE. The student is tempted to delete the video after people start spotting a ghost within the video, but is encouraged not to by a different student, as it would anger the spirits. The video goes viral internationally as people begin to spot more and more anomalies within the video, as well as hidden meanings when the song is translated into a multitude of languages and reversed.

Due to the fame of the initial clip, the student releases a second video as encouraged by his mother, but it fails to replicate the first video's fame. The student then deletes both videos but is met by his crush, who tells him that it was pointless to delete them because people already downloaded the videos. She brings up how both songs were inspired by the time he sketched her in art class in middle school. The one-shot ends with them both listening to the songs together.

== Publication ==
Written by Tatsuki Fujimoto and illustrated by Oto Toda, the one-shot was released on Shueisha's Shōnen Jump+ manga website on July 4, 2022.

Viz Media and Manga Plus published the one-shot in English simultaneously with its Japanese release.

== Reception ==
Brian Salvatore of Multiversity Comics praised the story despite the manga's short length, especially for how it left several parts to interpretation; Salvatore also praised Toda's artwork. However, Salvatore felt that the manga tells the reader what to think at times. Kazushi Shimada of Real Sound praised the story's message about looking for the deeper meaning in art and Toda's artwork. Shimada also liked that the story was left vague and open to interpretation at points.

== See also ==
- To Strip the Flesh, a manga anthology by Oto Toda
