= Dinosaur Hour =

Japanese manga series

- Dinosaur Hour!

恐竜の時間 (Kyouryu no Jikan)
- Genre: Comedy, family
- Manga
- Written by: Hitoshi Shioya
- Published by: Poplar Publishing
- English publisher: Viz Media
- Imprint: BomBom Comics
- Published: 2006

Dinosaur Hour! (恐竜の時間) is a Japanese manga series written and illustrated by Hitoshi Shioya. It features short stories about dinosaurs in humorous situations. It is unique for featuring chapters only 7 or 8 pages long. It started publication in 2004, while the first (and only) volume was published in Japan in 2006, and is published in Japan by Poplar Publishing. Viz Media has released this volume in English as well. The English release was reviewed by About.com, KidsReads, Blogcritics, and Midwest Book Review.
