= Gal x Gal Yuri =

Japanese manga series

- #Gal x Gal Yuri
- First tankōbon volume cover

#ギャルとギャルの百合 (#Gal to Gal no Yuri)
- Genre: Comedy; Coming-of-age; Yuri
- Manga
- Written by: Koharu Inoue
- Published by: Shogakukan
- English publisher: NA: Viz Media
- Imprint: Shōnen Sunday Comics Special
- Magazine: Sunday Webry
- Original run: June 10, 2025 – present
- Volumes: 2
- icon

#Gal x Gal Yuri (Japanese: #ギャルとギャルの百合, Hepburn: Gyaru to Gyaru no Yuri) is a Japanese yuri manga series written and illustrated by Koharu Inoue. It has been serialized on Shogakukan's digital platform Sunday Webry since June 2025 and is licensed for an English-language release by Viz Media. The series follow's two gyaru girls who begin dating in high school.

== Synopsis ==
The story begins when Rena suggests to Yua, who has just broken up with her boyfriend, that they go out together. The two start dating casually, but a year passes in the blink of an eye and they soon find themselves in their third year of high school. Together they enjoy their day-to-day lives as students and a couple.

== Characters ==
Yua Taooka (峠岡 結愛, Taooka Yua)
A gyaru with blonde hair, and Reina's girlfriend. She started her relationship with Reina after breaking up with her boyfriend. She works part-time at a ramen restaurant.
Reina Watase (渡瀬 玲奈, Watase Reina)
Yua's girlfriend, who is also a gyaru. She is intelligent and has a more mature personality compared to Yua. Her parents are both approving of their relationship and care for Yua as well.
Kokona Yazawa (矢沢 心菜, Yazawa Kokona)
Yua's childhood friend.
Shion (紫音)
Akane (朱音)

== Publication ==
Written and illustrated by Koharu Inoue, #Gal x Gal Yuri began serialization in Shogakukan's digital platform Sunday Webry on June 10, 2025. The series' first tankōbon volume was released on December 26, 2025. Two volumes have been released as of October 9, 2026.

In December 2025, Viz Media announced it would be releasing the series in English as a simulpub on its website and app. In June 2026, Viz Media announced that they would release volumes of the series in Q2 2027.

No.	Original release date	Original ISBN	English release date	English ISBN
1	December 26, 2025	978-4-09-854389-2	—	—
2	October 9, 2026	978-4-09-854838-5	—	—

== Reception ==
The series was ranked 5th in AnimeJapan's "Manga We Want to See Animated" poll in 2026. The series was nominated for the twelfth Next Manga Award in 2026 in the web category.
