= Beauty Is the Beast =

Japanese manga series by Tomo Matsumoto

- Beauty is the Beast
- North American cover of the first manga volume

美女が野獣 (Bijo ga Yajū)
- Genre: Romance
- Manga
- Written by: Tomo Matsumoto
- Published by: Hakusensha
- English publisher: NA: Viz Media
- Imprint: Hana to Yume Comics
- Magazine: LaLa
- Original run: May 24, 2002 – December 24, 2004
- Volumes: 5

Beauty is the Beast (Japanese: 美女が野獣, Hepburn: Bijo ga Yajū) is a Japanese manga series written and illustrated by Tomo Matsumoto. It was serialized in Hakusensha's shōjo manga magazine LaLa from 2002 to 2004, with its chapters collected into five tankōbon volumes. Beauty is the Beast is licensed in English by Viz Media's Shojo Beat imprint.

== Characters ==
Eimi Yamashita (山下 詠美, Yamashita Eimi)
A bubbly, young 11th-grader that moves into the school dormitory. Loves to give nicknames, such as Wanichin (Wanibuchi). She is quite dense to many situations (especially to expressions of love from Satoshi). At the end of the manga we see a girl who looks very much like Eimi say that her parents met at the school and fell in love there.
Misao Kurakawa (黒川 操, Kurakawa Misao)
Eimi's roommate. Loves the female body, and even has a poster plastered on her wall, with dancing ladies. She later became a receptionist.
Suzu Katsuragi (桂木 涼, Katsuragi Suzu)
A girl who lives in the dorms, and is friends with Eimi. Considered a "ladies' woman" because of her boyish looks, but she is oblivious to it. Later she becomes a quite successful architect. She is drawn to cute things, especially cute underwear.
Takami Wanibuchi (鰐淵 貴美, Wanibuchi Takami)
One of Eimi's friends that lives in the men's dorm. People think of him as a dangerous person at first glance, but he has a deeper side to him. For eight years he lived with his grandfather in Mexico. Wanibuchi harbours a deep hatred for his father. In order to cover up his own guilt of his younger sister's death, Wanibuchi blames his father's negligence. He later marries Eimi and they have a daughter. He also works as a hotel manager. Wanibuchi is known for his ability for fixing electrical and sewage materials. Wanibuchi's daughter has the appearance of Eimi but her personality is similar to his.
Satoshi Shimonuki (下貫 聡, Shimonuki Satoshi)
A guy from the boy's dormitory who falls in love with Eimi in volume 3. He is often jealous of Wanibuchi because Eimi is very affectionate towards him. Nicknamed "Simone" by Eimi. He is quite serious with everything he does rather with his studies or Eimi. He later joins a newspaper company after graduating from Tokyo University.
Inui (乾)
The roommate of Wanibuchi, Inui is pretty laid back. Suzu likes him, but it's not positive whether he likes her back or not. He entered biological research school after graduation, nicknamed Nuinui by Eimi.

== Publication ==
Beauty is the Beast premiered in the July 2002 issue of Hakusensha's shōjo manga magazine LaLa on May 24, 2002. Its final chapter was published in the magazine's February 2005 issue on December 24, 2004. The series was collected into five tankōbon volumes published by Hakusensha's Hana to Yume Comics imprint. It is licensed in English by Viz Media's Shojo Beat imprint.

=== Volumes list ===
Cover of Japanese tankōbon 5

==== Japanese ====
1. ISBN 4-592-17871-8 released on January 6, 2003
2. ISBN 4-592-17872-6 released on August 4, 2003
3. ISBN 4-592-17873-4 released on March 5, 2004
4. ISBN 4-592-17874-2 released on November 5, 2004
5. ISBN 4-592-17098-9 released on March 5, 2005

==== English ====
1. ISBN 1-4215-0289-5 released on November 6, 2005
2. ISBN 1-4215-0352-2 released on February 6, 2006
3. ISBN 1-4215-0353-0 released on May 2, 2006
4. ISBN 1-4215-0354-9 released on August 1, 2006
5. ISBN 1-4215-0355-7 released on November 7, 2006

== Reception ==
Paul Dale Roberts from Manga Life said Beauty is the Beast is "a story that women and girls should enjoy", but he found himself "getting sleepy in some parts of the story". Julie Rosato from Mania Entertainment commented that the artwork "is pretty typical for shoujo works, with nothing particularly outstanding about it." Rosato compared the series with Here is Greenwood, but "while it shares with Greenwood plenty of quirky characters and a quiet, nearly sneaky wit, it so far lacks the same charm." She also can't "quite tell if the focus of this story is supposed to be on the various (and sometimes romantic) adventures of the wacky dorm-mates or if it will be on the painfully clumsy love developing between Eimi and Wanibuchi."

Writing for IGN, Jessica Chobot noted that "although [it is] focused primarily on the relationship between Eimi and Wanibuchi, Beauty is the Beast is a collection of off-kilter love stories, bringing to light all the adventures amongst the students at Seikei Academy in a lighthearted and charming manner." Chobot praised the artwork, "although the lack of solid blacks and overuse of similar toned grays cause the illustrations to look floaty and not solid. However, emotions are well-conveyed through the use of line work." In 2005, Beauty is the Beast was listed by IGN as the tenth best shōjo manga released in English.
