= To Strip the Flesh =

Japanese manga anthology

- Cover of the Japanese volume

遠田おと短編集 にくをはぐ (Tōda Oto Tanpenshū: Niku o Hagu)
- Genre: Drama
- Manga
- Written by: Oto Toda
- Published by: Shueisha
- English publisher: NA: Viz Media
- Imprint: Jump Comics+
- Published: August 4, 2020
- Volumes: 1

To Strip the Flesh (遠田おと短編集 にくをはぐ, Tōda Oto Tanpenshū: Niku o Hagu) is a Japanese anthology manga written and illustrated by Oto Toda. The anthology was published in Japan by Shueisha under their Jump Comics+ imprint in August 2020.

== Publication ==
The anthology collects one-shots released by Oto Toda in various magazines, such as ITAN [jp] and Shōnen Jump+. The anthology volume was released in Japan on August 4, 2020.

In October 2021, Viz Media announced that they licensed the anthology for English publication. They released the anthology on June 21, 2022.

== Reception ==
Sheena McNeil from Sequential Tart praised the main one-shot in the collection, particularly enjoying the moral of self-expression present in the work. McNeil also enjoyed the other works present in the anthology. Rebecca Silverman from Anime News Network felt the anthology's main work was an "excellent exploration of interpersonal relationships". Silverman also liked the other included works. Shaenon K. Garrity from Otaku USA had similar feelings about the main story, offering it praise for its morals. For the other works, she felt they were all also entertaining, though she also felt they all followed a similar structure. Garrity also praised the artwork, comparing it to that of seinen manga and Chainsaw Man.

== See also ==
- Just Listen to the Song, another manga illustrated by Oto Toda
