= The Seaside Where Dragon Boys Dwell =

Japanese manga series

- First tankōbon volume cover

汐風と竜のすみか (Shiokaze to Ryū no Sumika)
- Genre: Drama, fantasy
- Manga
- Written by: Asato Shima
- Published by: Hakusensha
- English publisher: NA: Viz Media
- Imprint: HC Special
- Magazine: LaLa
- Original run: October 24, 2024 – present
- Volumes: 3

The Seaside Where Dragon Boys Dwell (汐風と竜のすみか, Shiokaze to Ryū no Sumika) is a Japanese manga series written and illustrated by Asato Shima. It began serialization in Hakusensha's shōjo manga magazine LaLa in October 2024.

== Synopsis ==
After the passing of her father, Mizuka gets taken in by her uncle and moves to Kagozaki, a seaside town known for inhabiting people with dragonlike abilities. When she gets to the house she moves in with Tenshin, a boy who has these abilities initially unbeknownst to her. The series focuses on these two settling in their new accommodation.

== Publication ==
Written and illustrated by Asato Shima, The Seaside Where Dragon Boys Dwell began serialization in Hakusensha's shōjo manga magazine LaLa on October 24, 2024. Its chapters have been collected in three tankōbon volumes as of May 2026.

In February 2026, Viz Media announced that they had licensed the series for English publication beginning in Q4 2026.

| No. | Original release date | Original ISBN | English release date | English ISBN |
|---|---|---|---|---|
| 1 | April 4, 2025 | 978-4-592-23065-6 | November 3, 2026 | 978-1-9747-6924-7 |
| 2 | September 5, 2025 | 978-4-592-23085-4 | February 2, 2027 | 978-1-9747-6925-4 |
| 3 | May 1, 2026 | 978-4-592-23121-9 | — | — |
| 4 | December 4, 2026 | 978-4-592-23183-7 | — | — |

== Reception ==
The series was ranked fifth in the 2026 edition of Takarajimasha's Kono Manga ga Sugoi! guidebook's list of the best manga for female readers.
