= Tomo Matsumoto =

Japanese manga artist

Tomo Matsumoto マツモト トモ
- Born: January 8 Osaka Prefecture, Japan
- Area: Manga artist
- Notable works: Beauty is the Beast; Inferno

Tomo Matsumoto (マツモト トモ, Matsumoto Tomo; born January 8 in Osaka Prefecture) is a Japanese manga artist. She made her professional debut with the short story Nemuri Hime (眠る姫; "Sleeping Princess"), published in the March 10, 1995, issue of Hakusensha's Lunatic LaLa magazine. Prior to becoming a manga artist, Matsumoto was a nurse.

== Works ==
- Kiss (キス) (1996–2001)
- 23:00 (2001–2002)
- Beauty is the Beast (美女が野獣) (2002–2004)
- Eikaiwa School Wars (英会話スクールウォーズ) (2005–2006)
- Beauty Honey (ビューティー ハニー) (2006–2008)
- Bōzu Love!!! (ボーズラブ!!!) (2009)
- Inferno (インヘルノ) (2013–2018)
- Hōgen Danshi no Tsukurikata (方言男子のつくり方) (2014–2018)
- Rhythm Nation (リズムナシオン) (2020–present)
