= Togari (manga) =

Japanese manga series by Yoshinori Natsume

- First tankōbon volume cover, featuring Tobei

トガリ
- Genre: Action; Dark fantasy
- Manga
- Written by: Yoshinori Natsume
- Published by: Shogakukan
- English publisher: NA: Viz Media
- Imprint: Shōnen Sunday Comics
- Magazine: Weekly Shōnen Sunday
- Original run: August 2, 2000 – February 13, 2002
- Volumes: 8
- Manga

Togari Shiro
- Written by: Yoshinori Natsume
- Published by: Media Factory
- Magazine: Monthly Comic Flapper
- Original run: October 5, 2009 – May 2, 2011
- Volumes: 3
- icon

Togari (トガリ) is a Japanese manga series written and illustrated by Yoshinori Natsume. The story follows orphan Tobei, who was beheaded for committing countless crimes in the Edo period and sent to Hell where he suffered for 300 years. The regent of Hell makes Tobei an offer to slay 108 "Togas" (spiritual manifestations of sin) in 108 days in 21st-century Japan with Togari, a magical sword. Tobei readily agrees for the chance to be free from Hell.

The manga was serialized in Shogakukan's Weekly Shōnen Sunday from August 2000 to February 2002, ending the series prematurely at 68 chapters. The individual chapters were collected in eight tankōbon volumes. The abrupt ending was intentional, as the last four pages of the eighth volume has a spoof advertisement for "Togari: The Perfect Edition". Then the publishers apologized for the spoof in the last page of the volume. The manga was licensed for English release in North America by Viz Media.

A sequel, titled Togari Shiro, was serialized in Media Factory's Monthly Comic Flapper from October 2009 to May 2011, with its chapters collected in three volumes.

== Plot ==
An orphan known as Tobei, who lived in Japan 300 years ago and committed countless violent crimes until the age of 16, was beheaded by villagers and subsequently sent to Hell as punishment. During his supposedly eternal punishment, Tobei made repeated escape attempts and became known for a particularly fiery spirit, everlasting determination, and a continuing refusal to repent for his sins. Given Tobei's dismal moral progress over the course of 300 years, he was made an offer to escape: take the Togari, (a magical bokken with strength proportional to the user's evil spirit) and slay 108 "Toga", spiritual manifestations of great sin that drive a human's actions, in 108 days. Ose, the demon responsible for torturing Tobei in Hell, was told to watch over Tobei while Tobei accomplished his mission.

However, Tobei was subject to two particular rules so as to facilitate his moral reshaping: Firstly, he cannot commit any sins or crimes; even if he begins thinking about committing a sin, the wounds from his decapitation 300 years ago will begin opening. If he actually completes a sin, he will be decapitated and sent back to Hell. Secondly, he cannot physically harm people. If he does, then the same damage is done to himself. Impeding Tobei's mission, however, is a property of the sword Togari: if Tobei loses control of it, then Togari will absorb him (so that he suffers eternally within Togari, along with all other souls of people who have failed this mission in the past). Furthermore, unlike in Hell, when all his physical wounds healed almost instantly, Tobei's body is mortal on Earth.

Under the supervision of Ose, who often takes the form of a dog while watching over Tobei, Tobei attempts to slay 108 Toga in the real world, and lives a different life than he did 300 years ago in part because of the people he meets and the restrictions against sinning placed on his body.

== Characters ==
Tobei (統兵衛)
Tobei is an orphan who survives on the streets of Edo-period Japan. After killing a nobleman, he steals the victim’s identity document and assumes the name Tobei Kihara. Ostracized and abused by society, he resorts to theft and violence to survive, eventually descending into uncontrollable rage. Captured at sixteen, he is executed and condemned to Hell, where Ose tortures him for 300 years as penance. Repeated escape attempts fail until Lady Ema offers him a bargain: collect 108 sins within 108 days to regain his freedom. Without hesitation, Tobei accepts.
Itsuki Asagi (浅木いつき, Asagi Itsuki)
Itsuki is a young high school girl whose cop father was murdered when she was still a child. She hates that her father's killer is still at large and probably living in peace. She became a tomboy after her father's death. Itsuki has a strong sense of justice and is the first to get a reaction from Tobei, other than bloodlust, just by thanking him for saving her (even if unintentionally) after she was nearly raped and murdered by a thug.
Ose (オセ)
Ose has been Tobei's handler for 100 years and was originally an angel. He was ordered by Lady Ema to follow Tobei in the human world as a dog to make sure he did not disrupt the order of the natural world. He is often mistaken by other people as Tobei's pet.
Ema (エマ)
Lady Ema is the regent of Hell. She offered Tobei his freedom if he could collect 108 sins in 108 days using the Togari. She oversees Tobei and Ose in the present time as a young business woman.
Sawazaki (さわざき)
Detective Sawazaki is a University of Tokyo graduate. He is an over-qualified police detective who's passed the first-class civil servant exam. He is highly suspicious of Tobei and follows the Toga-removed victims of Tobei closely. He comments that all the victims have suffered from "psychological trauma" when arrested. He was also the junior partner of Itsuki's father ten years before the start of the story.

== Development ==
Inspired by Japanese samurai films and with a concept that the protagonist is a "pure bad guy", author Natsume drew Tobei based on "someone who looked like he [would] be beheaded as a criminal". Lady Ema was first drawn by Natsume with an image of Enma Daio in mind but "she ended up turning into a sexy bombshell". The serialization of Togari was canceled by Weekly Shōnen Sunday.

== Publication ==
Written and illustrated by Yoshinori Natsume, Togari was serialized in Shogakukan's Weekly Shōnen Sunday from August 2, 2000, to February 13, 2002; (Note: It started in the magazine's 36th issue of 2000 (with cover date August 16), released on August 2 of that same year; it finished in the magazine's 11th issue of 2002 (with cover date February 27), released on February 13 of that same year.) the series ended prematurely at 68 chapters. Shogakukan collected the chapters in eight tankōbon volumes, released from January 18, 2001, and March 18, 2002. The abrupt ending was intentional by the publishers, as the last four pages of the eighth volume includes a spoof advertisement for Togari: The Perfect Edition. Then the publishers apologized for the spoof in the last page of the volume. Media Factory republished the series in a four-volume edition, released from October 23 to November 22, 2010.

Viz Media released the manga in North America, with English translation by AltJapan Co., Ltd. The eight volumes were released between July 10, 2007, and September 9, 2008.

Natsume wrote a sequel, titled Togari Shiro (咎狩 白), serialized in Media Factory's Monthly Comic Flapper from October 5, 2009, to May 2, 2011. Media Factory collected its chapters in three tankōbon volumes, released from May 22, 2010, to June 23, 2011.

=== Volumes ===
No.	Original release date	Original ISBN	English release date	English ISBN
1	January 18, 2001	978-4-091-26141-0	July 10, 2007	978-1-421-51355-3
01."Champion of Justice" (セイギノミカタ, Seigi no Mikata); 02."Thank You?" (アリガトウ…？, Arigatou...?); 03."Show Me the Sinners" (ツミハドコダ!?, Tsumi wa Doko da!?); 04."Is this How it's Supposed to Be?" (コレデイイノカ); 05."The Power of Togari" (トガリノチカラ, Togari no Chikara); 06."Hate Everything" (スベテヲニクメ, subete o Nikume)
2	March 17, 2001	978-4-091-26142-7	September 11, 2007	978-1-421-51356-0
07. "Reunion" (サイカイ, Saikai); 08. "Magic" (ヨウジュツ, Youjutsu); 09. "The Funeral" (オソウシキ, Osoushiki); 10. "Nothingness" (ム, Mu); 11. "Darkness" (フカククライヤミ); 12. "Downtown" (マチ, Machi); 13. "Helpless" (ムリョク, Muryoku); 14. "Loneliness" (ヒトリ, Hitori)
3	June 18, 2001	978-4-091-26143-4	November 13, 2007	978-1-421-51357-7
15. "Human Life" (ヒトノイノチ, Hito no Inochi); 16. "Fear" (コワイ, Kowai); 17. "The Rookie" (ルーキー, Ruukii); 18. "The Scent of Darkness" (ヤミノニオイ, Yami no Nioi); 19. "Alternative to Destruction" (コワスヨリモ, Kowasu Yori mo); 20. "I Started Like This?" (ココカラ, Koko Kara); 21. "A Hero?" (ヒーロー？, Hiiroo?); 22. "In My Way" (ジャマダ, Jamada); 23. "Sapped of Strength" (チカラガデナイ, Chikara ga Denai)
4	August 9, 2001	978-1-421-51357-7	January 8, 2008	978-1-421-51357-7
24. "A Name" (ナマエ, Namae); 25. "Dark Shadows" (クロイカゲ, Kuroi Kage); 26. "Time Flies" (トキノナガレ, Toki no Nagare); 27. "All I Can Do" (デキルコト, Dekiru Koto); 28. "Moonlight" (ゲッコウ, Gekkō); 29. "Your Power" (キミノチカラ, Kimi no Chikara); 30. "A Place to Be" (ココニイル, Koko ni Iru); 31. "No Going Back" (モドラナイ, Modoranai); 32. "It Begins" (ハジマリ, Hajimaru)
5	October 18, 2001	978-4-091-26145-8	March 11, 2008	978-1-421-51701-8
33. "Where Are You?" (ドコニイル？); 34. "More Power" (モットチカラヲ); 35. "Real Power" (ホンモン); 36. "Not Enough" (タリナイ…); 37. "This Time" (コンドハ…); 38. "Making Enemies?" (テキ…？); 39. "Lucky" (ウンガイイ); 40. "Nicknames" (ヨビナ); 41. "I Don't Run or Hide" (ニゲモカクレモ)
6	December 18, 2001	978-4-091-26146-5	May 13, 2008	978-1-421-51702-5
42. "I Don't Mind Either Way" (カンケエネエ); 43. "Don't Touch Her" (サワンナ); 44. "I Don't Like It" (キニイラネエ); 45. "Out of Desperation" (ヤクソク); 46. "A Murderer" (ヒトゴロシ); 47. "The Stage" (ステージ); 48. "A Tamed Dog" (カイイヌ); 49. "At the Bottom of the Darkness" (イバショ); 50. "I See You" (オマエガミエル)
7	February 18, 2002	978-4-091-26147-2	July 8, 2008	978-1-421-51703-2
51. "How Could You..." (ヨクモ…); 52. "Who Killed Her?" (ダレガコロシタ？); 53. "Give Me Your Power!!" (チカラヲヨコセ!!); 54. "I Won't Run Away" (ニゲルワケニハ); 55. "You Have to Call Me!" (オレヲヨベ!!); 56. "The Demon who Wished to be Human" (ヒトニナリタカッタオニ); 57. "I Will Not Disappear" (ニゲネエ); 58. "I Will Devour You" (オマエヲノム); 59. "Bis" (アンコール)
8	March 18, 2002	978-4-091-26148-9	September 9, 2008	978-1-421-51704-9
60. "The Leading Role" (シュヤク); 61. "What I Have to Say" (イウベキコトバ); 62. "After All" (アレカラ); 63. "Amy" (アミ); 64. "The Strength of a Human Being" (ヒトノチカラ); 65. "The Future" (ミライ); 66. "I Want to Become 'Myself'" (ボクニナル); 67. "What I'm Going to do in the Future" (ミライノタメニデキルコト); 68. "Thanks" (アリガトウ)

== Reception ==
Natsume's art was commended for featuring "heavy inks, lots of crosshatching, and copious amounts of shading". Mania.com's Patricia Beard feels that the manga makes a "compelling read" by "laying out its premise and conditions by the mid-point of the first volume". Manga Life's Michael Aronson comments that the manga simply rearranges the "premise of every other pop manga series. We have an anachronistic protagonist (InuYasha) who’s rather impure at heart (Death Note) hunting spirits that no one else can see (Bleach)". Ed Sizemore from Comics Worth Reading criticises the series for ending its unfinished story with volume 8. As well as "putting salt in the wound" by advertising for "Togari: The Perfect Edition" in the last four pages, with the last sentence of the ad reading: "Sorry, this was all a joke! Thank you all for reading." Jason Thompson's online appendix to Manga: The Complete Guide compares Togari to Inuyasha in their shared theme of "a villain gradually [turning] into a good guy" commenting that "Togari makes a stronger than usual effort to show Tobe’s gradual socialization process." Thompson also comments on the art "while not nearly as scary as the premise suggests, is clean and chiseled, similar to Ryōji Minagawa." In a series of reviews on Manga News, the manga's graphics is commended for its "pure style with panels that are not overdone", commendation on the level of precision through explanation, with discrete action and advancing the plot through the use of intrigue.
