= Demon prince =

Demon prince or prince demon may refer to:

- Demon Princes, a series of science-fiction novels
- The Demon Prince of Momochi House, a Japanese romance manga
- Demon Prince Enma, a Japanese horror anime and manga
- Prince demons, a type of monsters in the Dungeons & Dragons setting

== See also ==
- Demon
- Classification of demons
- List of Dungeons & Dragons deities
