= Akihiro Yamada =

Japanese illustrator and manga artist

- 山田 章博
- Born: February 10, 1957 (age 69); Kōchi, Kōchi Prefecture, Japan
- Known for: Manga, illustration
- Awards: 1996 Seiun Award
- Website: Official website

Akihiro Yamada (山田 章博, Yamada Akihiro); born February 10, 1957, in Kōchi) is a Japanese illustrator and manga artist. During his career, Yamada has branched out into making book covers, character design for video games, theatre costume and set design, concept design for live-action film, and more, though his passion continues to be working on manga. He is known for delicate images reminiscent of suiboku and depiction of fantasy subjects. His most popular work is perhaps with The Twelve Kingdoms franchise. He won the Seiun Award in 1996 in the Best Artist category. He currently lives in Kyoto.

== Early life and education ==
Yamada was born on February 10, 1957, in Kōchi, Japan and attended Kochi Nishi High School. He entered Osaka University to study economics and published his debut comic, Padan Padan (ぱだんぱだん), in 1981 in the magazine Monthly OUT. He published Mermaid Changer (人魚變生) the following year. Prior to finishing his degree, he left university to pursue a career in illustration.

== Career ==
Yamada has produced art and character design for a wide range of media, including manga, video games, novels, and anime. Among his best known works are the art for Fuyumi Ono's The Twelve Kingdoms series and Mizuno Ryo's Record of Lodoss War. He has worked on anime such as RahXephon and the adaptation of The Twelve Kingdoms. He designed for PlayStation games Saiyuki: Journey West and Front Mission 3; various Might and Magic and Wizardry titles on PC Engine; and Mystic Ark and Castlevania on Super Famicom.

Yamada worked on concept design for the live-action film Shinobi: Heart Under Blade and was art director for Koga Ninjutsu. He has also created covers for English-to-Japanese translations, including for The Dark Tower by Stephen King. Additionally, he did costume and set design for the theatre show GEAR. In 1996, he won the Seiun Award for Best Artist. In the 2010s, he was a visiting professor in Kyoto Seika University's manga department. Yumi Tamura has cited Yamada's work as one of her inspirations.

=== Style ===
Yadama's style is heavily influenced by Chinese gongbi and by the chivalry of medieval European artwork. Phoenix Television pointed out that his work contains elements from Gustave Doré's print lines and Alphonse Mucha's "decorative images" and describes his style as combining European swords and magic and the "delicacy of Eastern culture." In 2018, Sohu echoed many of these sentiments and described him as having a "unique fantasy style... with delicate brushstrokes."

== Selected works ==
=== Anime ===
| Year(s) | Title | Character Design | Notes | Ref |
|---|---|---|---|---|
| 2002–2003 | The Twelve Kingdoms | X* | *Character design draft | |
| 2024 | Metallic Rogue | X | | |

=== Manga and novels ===
| Year | Title (English) | Title (Japanese) | Art | Writer | |
|---|---|---|---|---|---|
| 1983–1989 | Tales from the Star World | 星界物语三部曲 | X | Akihira Yamada | |
| 1991 | Record of Lodoss War: Saint of Pharis | ファリスの聖女 | X | Ryo Mizuno | |
| 1991 | Tragedy of the Garden of Many Flowers | 百花庭園の悲劇 | X | Akihiro Yamada | |
| 1992 | The Twelve Kingdoms series | 十二国記 | X | Fuyumi Ono | |
| 1994 | Legend of Lodoss: Prince of the Fallen Land | ロードス島伝説 亡国の王子 | X | Ryo Mizuno | |
| 2001–2007 | Dream Buster | ドリームバスター | X | Miyuki Miyabe | |
| 2011 | Beast of East: Eastern Vertigo | 東方の獣 めまい | X | Akihiro Yamada | |
| 1989–2014 | The Last Continent | ラストコンチネント | X | Akihiro Yamada | |
| 2014 | Red Magic Detective Team | 红色魔术侦探团 | X | Akihiro Yamada | |
| 1986–2017 | The Heroic Legend of Arslan | アルスラーン戦 | X | Yoshiki Tanaka | |
| 2020 | The Lairs of the Secret Gods | 秘神界 | X* | Ken Asamatsu (editor) | *Cover art |
| 2018–2021 | King of Fire Hunting | 火狩りの王 | X | Rieko Hinata | |

=== Video games ===
| Year | Title (in English) | Title (in Japanese) | Console | Art | Character Design | Notes | Ref |
|---|---|---|---|---|---|---|---|
| 1990 | Black Rainbow | | PC-98 | X | X | | |
| 1992 | Black Rainbow II | | PC-98 | X | X | | |
| 1993 | Might and Magic III: Isles of Terra | | PC Engine | X* | | *Japanese version | |
| 1993 | Ancient Magic | バズー!魔法世界 | Super Famicom | X | X | | |
| 1993 | Gaiapolis | ガイアポリス: 黄金鷹の剣 | Arcade | | | Promotional Art | |
| 1993 | Wizardry I・II | 謎の地下遺跡 | PC Engine | X | | | |
| 1993 | Castlevania: Rondo of Blood | 悪魔城ドラキュラX 血の輪廻ロンド | PC Engine | X | X | | |
| 1994 | Wizardry III・IV | | PC Engine | X | | | |
| 1994/1995 | Kingdom Grandprix | 疾風魔法大作戦 | Arcade, Sega Saturn | X* | X | *Cover art for Sega Saturn release | |
| 1995 | Mystic Ark | ミスティックアーク | Super Famicom | X | X | | |
| 1995 | Castlevania: Dracula X | 悪魔城ドラキュラXX | Super Famicom, Super NES | X | X | | |
| 1996 | Terra Phantastica | | Sega Saturn | X | X | | |
| 1997 | Milandra | | Super Famicom | X | | | |
| 1999 | Front Mission 3 | フロントミッション サード | PlayStation | | X | | |
| 1999 | Mystic Ark: Maboroshi Gekijo | まぼろし劇場 | PlayStation | X | X | | |
| 1999 | Meremanoid | 深海伝説MEREMANOID | PlayStation | X | X | | |
| 1999 | Saiyuki: Journey West | 西遊記 | PlayStation | X | X | | |
| 2014 | VANITY of VANITIES | 《VANITY of VANITIES》 | | | X | | |
| 2009/2010 | Heroes of Three Kingdoms | 三国群侠传 | | X | X | | |
| 2017 | Fire Emblem Heroes | ファイアーエムブレム ヒーローズ | Android, iOS | | X* | Character design for Jagen, Ogma, Zephiel [Binding Blade ver.], Gunter, Bantu, Mila, Gatekeeper | |
