= Aria (magazine) =

Japanese manga magazine

- September 2010 issue cover
- Categories: Shōjo/Josei manga
- Frequency: Monthly
- Circulation: 8,467; (October – December 2017)
- First issue: July 28, 2010
- Final issue: April 28, 2018
- Company: Kodansha
- Country: Japan
- Based in: Tokyo
- Language: Japanese
- Website: http://aria-comic.jp/

Aria was a Japanese monthly josei and shōjo manga magazine published by Kodansha. In April 2010 an announcement was made about plans for a new magazine; its first issue was published on July 28 of that same year. The magazine was released in size B5 paper.

In 2013, Kodansha temporarily increased Aria's print count by roughly 500% to approximately 80,000 copies because of the demand for the prologue chapter of the Attack on Titan spin-off Attack on Titan: No Regrets, which was published before the serialization began. On March 27, 2018, it was announced that the magazine would cease its publication on April 28, and most its series would be moved to Kodansha's new app Palcy.

== Serializations ==
- Haikyo Shōjo by Tsukiji Nao (2010–2012)
- Demon From Afar by Kaori Yuki (2010–2013)
- Manga Dogs by Ema Tōyama (2010–2013)
- He's My Only Vampire by Aya Shouoto (2010–2014)
- No. 6 by Atsuko Asano (original story) and Hinoki Kino (2011–2016)
- The Prince in His Dark Days by Hico Yamanaka (2011–2013)
- Ani-Imo by Haruko Kurumatani (2012–2014)
- Akumu no Sumu Ie: Ghost Hunt by Fuyumi Ono (original story) and Shiho Inada (2012–2016)
- First Love Monster by Akira Hiyoshimaru (2013–2016)
- Attack on Titan: No Regrets by Gun Snark (story) and Hikaru Suruga (art) (2013–2014)
- Alice in Murderland by Kaori Yuki (2014–2018)
- Neo Parasyte f by Various Artists (2014–2015)
- The Seven Deadly Sins Production by Chiemi Sakamoto (2015–2017)
- Ensemble Stars! by Ichi Sayo (2015–2016)
- Pretty Boy Detective Club by Nisio Isin (original story) and Suzuka Oda (2016–2018)
