= Alice in Murderland (manga) =

Japanese manga series

- First tankōbon volume cover

架刑のアリス (Kakei no Arisu)
- Genre: Gothic fantasy
- Manga
- Written by: Kaori Yuki
- Published by: Kodansha
- English publisher: NA: Yen Press
- Magazine: Aria (2014–2018); Shōnen Magazine Edge (2018)
- Original run: 28 January 2014 – 15 September 2018
- Volumes: 11
- icon

Alice in Murderland (Japanese: 架刑のアリス, Hepburn: Kakei no Arisu) is a Japanese manga series written and illustrated by Kaori Yuki. It was published in Kodansha's shōjo manga magazine Aria from January 2014 to April 2018, and later, after Aria ceased publication, serialized in Shōnen Magazine Edge from July to September 2018. Kodansha collected its chapters in eleven tankōbon volumes.

== Plot ==
The series centers on Stella Kuonji, one of nine adopted siblings in the wealthy and influential Kuonji family. At one of the family's monthly tea parties, their parents announce that the children must now fight to the death within the next year, with the sole survivor being chosen as the family's heir. In the ensuing chaos, Stella's violent alternative personality, Bloody Alice, begins to resurface in Stella's clashes with the other children.

As the series progresses, Stella learns that her adopted family are actually bandersnatches, creatures that feed on human souls, and that they require the tea at the monthly tea parties to survive. Her adopted mother, Olga, was the sole survivor of one of the Kuonji family's rituals of bloodshed among its children. As a result of winning, Olga was allowed to bring back her partner. Furthermore, Stella begins to suspect that the accident that killed her parents was a plot by the Kuonji family. Although Stella and her beloved elder brother Zeno wish to end the family tradition of ritualistic bloodshed, Olga denies that possibility.

== Release ==
Written and illustrated by Kaori Yuki, Alice in Murderland started it serialization in Kodansha's shōjo manga magazine Aria on 28 January 2014. After Aria ceased publication on 28 April 2018, the series was transferred to Shōnen Magazine Edge, starting publication on 17 July of the same year. The series finished on 15 September 2018. Kodansha collected its chapters in eleven tankōbon volumes, released from 6 June 2014 to 5 October 2018.

Yen Press licensed the series for release in North America.

=== Volumes ===
| No. | Original release date | Original ISBN | English release date | English ISBN |
|---|---|---|---|---|
| 1 | 6 June 2014 | 978-4-06-380702-8 | 23 June 2015 | 9780316342124 |
| 2 | 7 November 2014 | 978-4-06-380725-7 | 27 October 2015 | 9780316348942 |
| 3 | 7 May 2015 | 978-4-06-380765-3 | 26 January 2016 | 9780316268936 |
| 4 | 7 October 2015 | 978-4-06-380807-0 | 5 July 2016 | 9780316272377 |
| 5 | 7 March 2016 | 978-4-06-380838-4 | 31 January 2017 | 9780316502795 |
| 6 | 5 August 2016 | 978-4-06-380867-4 | 18 April 2017 | 9780316469319 |
| 7 | 6 January 2017 | 978-4-06-380898-8 | 9 September 2017 | 9780316562638 |
| 8 | 7 July 2017 | 978-4-06-380929-9 | 20 February 2018 | 9780316415972 |
| 9 | 7 November 2017 | 978-4-06-510469-9 | 27 November 2018 | 9781975327972 |
| 10 | 7 June 2018 | 978-4-06-511736-1 | 26 March 2019 | 9781975329624 |
| 11 | 5 October 2018 | 978-4-06-511736-1 | 2 July 2019 | 9781975357535 |

== Reception ==
Reviewing the first volume for Anime News Network, Rebecca Silverman gave it a grade of B. She commented that the series "doesn't always work, but it has enough potential to that given another volume or two, I feel like it will really take off." She praised the art, and wrote that Stella's mother "is definitely a leading contender for 'sickest parent in manga.'", saying that the scenes with the parents were "a combination of enraging and chilling, making them easily the most effective part of the volume."
