= He's My Only Vampire =

Japanese manga series

- First tankōbon volume cover

純血+彼氏 (Junketsu + Kareshi)
- Genre: Dark fantasy; Romance
- Manga
- Written by: Aya Shouoto
- Published by: Kodansha
- English publisher: NA: Yen Press
- Magazine: Aria
- Original run: July 28, 2010 – September 27, 2014
- Volumes: 10
- icon

He's My Only Vampire (Japanese: 純血+彼氏, Hepburn: Junketsu + Kareshi) is a Japanese manga series written and illustrated by Aya Shouoto. It was serialized in Kodansha's shōjo manga magazine Aria from July 2010 to September 2014, with its chapters collected in ten tankōbon volumes. In North America, the manga was licensed by Yen Press.

== Publication ==
Written and illustrated by Aya Shouoto, He's My Only Vampire was serialized in Kodansha's shōjo manga magazine Aria from July 28, 2010, to September 27, 2014. Kodansha collected its chapters in ten tankōbon volumes, released from March 7, 2011, to December 5, 2014.

In North America, the manga was licensed for English release by Yen Press.

=== Volumes ===
No.	Original release date	Original ISBN	English release date	English ISBN
1	March 7, 2011	978-4-06-380504-8	December 16, 2014	978-0-316-33666-6
2	June 7, 2011	978-4-06-380517-8	March 24, 2015	978-0-316-38271-7
3	November 7, 2011	978-4-06-380544-4	June 23, 2015	978-0-316-26055-8
4	April 6, 2012	978-4-06-380566-6	September 22, 2015	978-0-316-26168-5
5	August 7, 2012	978-4-06-380585-7	December 15, 2015	978-0-316-30219-7
6	January 7, 2013	978-4-06-380609-0	March 22, 2016	978-0-316-34581-1
7	June 7, 2013	978-4-06-380633-5	June 21, 2016	978-0-316-34582-8
8	November 7, 2013	978-4-06-380655-7	September 20, 2016	978-0-316-34583-5
9	May 7, 2014	978-4-06-380690-8	December 13, 2016	978-0-316-34584-2
10	December 5, 2014	978-4-06-380733-2	March 21, 2017	978-0-316-39912-8

== See also ==
- Kiss of the Rose Princess, another manga series by the same author
- The Demon Prince of Momochi House, another manga series by the same author
