= The Prince in His Dark Days =

Japanese manga series

- First tankōbon volume cover

王子様と灰色の日々 (Ōjisama to Haiiro no Hibi)
- Genre: Drama, romance
- Manga
- Written by: Hico Yamanaka
- Published by: Kodansha
- English publisher: NA: Kodansha USA
- Magazine: Aria
- Original run: April 28, 2011 – May 28, 2013
- Volumes: 4
- icon

The Prince in His Dark Days (Japanese: 王子様と灰色の日々, Hepburn: Ōjisama to Haiiro no Hibi) is a Japanese manga series written and illustrated by Hico Yamanaka. It was serialized in Kodansha's shōjo manga magazine Aria from April 2011 to May 2013, with its chapters collected in four tankōbon volumes.

== Publication ==
Written and illustrated by Hico Yamanaka, The Prince in His Dark Days was serialized in Kodansha's shōjo manga magazine Aria from April 28, 2011, to May 28, 2013. Kodansha collected its chapters in four tankōbon volumes, released from October 7, 2011, to August 7, 2013.

In North America, the manga was licensed for English release by Kodansha USA. The four volumes were released from September 27, 2016, to April 11, 2017.

=== Volumes ===
| No. | Original release date | Original ISBN | English release date | English ISBN |
|---|---|---|---|---|
| 1 | October 7, 2011 | 978-4-06-380540-6 | September 27, 2016 | 978-1-63236-367-1 |
| 2 | May 7, 2012 | 978-4-06-380573-4 | November 22, 2016 | 978-1-63236-368-8 |
| 3 | November 7, 2012 | 978-4-06-380599-4 | February 28, 2017 | 978-1-63236-398-5 |
| 4 | August 7, 2013 | 978-4-06-380643-4 | April 11, 2017 | 978-1-63236-399-2 |
