= First Love Monster =

Japanese manga series

- Cover of the first Japanese volume

初恋モンスター (Hatsukoi Monsutā)
- Genre: Romantic comedy
- Manga
- Written by: Akira Hiyoshimaru
- Published by: Kodansha
- English publisher: NA: Yen Press
- Magazine: Aria (28 January 2013 – 28 November 2016); Pixiv Comics (3 March 2017 – present)
- Original run: 28 January 2013 – present (on hiatus)
- Volumes: 8
- Anime television series
- Directed by: Takayuki Inagaki
- Produced by: Suzuki Renta; Yohei Ito
- Written by: Deko Akao; Sayuri Ooba; Takashi Aoshima
- Music by: Go Sakabe
- Studio: Studio Deen
- Licensed by: AUS: Madman Entertainment; NA: Funimation; SA/SEA: Medialink
- Original network: AT-X, Tokyo MX, KBS, Sun TV, BS11
- English network: SEA: Animax Asia
- Original run: 2 July 2016 – 17 September 2016
- Episodes: 12 + OVA
- Novel
- Written by: Makoto Nohara
- Illustrated by: Akira Hiyoshimaru
- Published by: Kodansha
- Imprint: KC Deluxe
- Published: March 2, 2017

First Love Monster (初恋モンスター, Hatsukoi Monsutā) is a Japanese manga series written by Akira Hiyoshimaru. It was first published in Kodansha's shōjo manga magazine Aria from 2013 to 2016 and later on the Pixiv Comics starting in 2018. An anime television adaptation aired from July to September 2016.

== Plot ==
The story follows 15-year-old Kaho Nikaidō as she leaves home to live in a high school dormitory. Almost getting hit by a truck, she is saved by a boy named Kanade Takahashi. She falls in love with him, only to discover that he is her landlord's son and a fifth grader.

== Characters ==
Kaho Nikaidō (二階堂 夏歩, Nikaidō Kaho)
Voiced by: Yui Horie (Japanese); Bryn Apprill (English)
The main protagonist of the series. Kaho is a 15-year-old girl and falls in love with Kanade after he saves her from an accident. As the spoiled daughter of an elderly rich couple, she has found it difficult to make friends. Whilst she is a perfectly pleasant person she is used to never being criticised or spoken to harshly due to everyone in her home kneeling her family. This is why making true friends not those just interested in her status was hard for her. She is attracted to Kanade initially as he very loudly and angrily tells her off for her carelessness at nearly being run over. This took her aback as it had never happened before. She is not at all boastful despite her wealth and tries to live as normally as possible.
Kanade Takahashi (高橋 奏, Takahashi Kanade)
Voiced by: Takahiro Sakurai (Japanese); Eric Vale (English)
A fifth grader and the object of Kaho's affections. He is 10 years old, but looks significantly older. Although he mostly behaves his age, he at times shows mature behaviour, passed on from his deceased mother who serves as his role model.
Tomu Kaneko (金子 十六, Kaneko Tomu)
Voiced by: Showtaro Morikubo (Japanese); Austin Tindle (English)
One of Kanade's friends and a delinquent. Like Kanade he's also considerably tall for his age.
Ginjirō Sannomiya (三宮 銀次郎, Sannomiya Ginjirō)
Voiced by: Tomokazu Sugita (Japanese); Chris Ryan (English)
A grade schooler and another of Kanade's friends. Like Kanade he's also considerably tall for his age. His father is an OB/GYN where he is groomed to follow his father's profession.
Kazuo Noguchi (野口 一男, Noguchi Kazuo)
Voiced by: Ayumu Murase (Japanese); Dallas Reid (English)
Another of Kanade's friends, but of normal size. Contrary to his age, he is far more mature, level-headed and insightful than his peers, to the point that it surprises Kaho and Kanade's circle consider him their leader. He disapproves of their relationship due to their age difference and believing that Kanade only clings to her out of lack of a maternal figure. Despite this he still addresses Kaho respectfully. Since he has a butler it is hinted he comes from a rich family.
Jōji Takahashi (高橋 譲二, Takahashi Jōji)
Voiced by: Kenichi Suzumura (Japanese); Anthony Bowling (English)
Kanade's cousin. He has a strong kansai dialect and is one year older than Kanade. Both him and Kanade get along very well. He has an interest on Kaho.
Kōta Shinohara (篠原 耕太, Shinohara Kōta)
Voiced by: Nobuhiko Okamoto (Japanese); Chris Burnett (English)
A first-year high schooler who was in love with Kaho. He's one of the residents of Kaho's dorm. Due to being a shy individual he's often the victim of many of Kanade's circles stunts, as well as being teased frequently by Chiaki due to his crush on Kaho and his inability to act and being easily scared on several matters. He hides an effeminate face under his bangs.
Atsushi Taga (多賀 敦史, Taga Atsushi)
Voiced by: Kaito Ishikawa (Japanese); Ian Sinclair (English)
A college student and Kaho's rival. He bears an extremely hostile attitude towards Kaho. He claims to be interested in Kanade though as the anime progresses he seems to develop feelings for Kaho.
Arashi Nagasawa (長澤 嵐, Nagasawa Arashi)
Voiced by: Kenjiro Tsuda (Japanese); Newton Pittman (English)
Kaho's strange neighbor. He likes and collects cute things and is a hardcore fan of the idol Renren. He dates Chiaki who accepts him as he is, although she is often annoyed with his otaku fanaticism.
Daikoku Nikaidō (二階堂 大谷, Nikaidō Daikoku)
Voiced by: Hikaru Midorikawa (Japanese); J. Michael Tatum (English)
Kaho's older brother. He went to America for some time. Despite calling himself a "doting brother" he in fact has a morbid obsession with Kaho, going as far as collect items she has used (such as chopsticks or leftovers) and place them in a plastic bag.
Chiaki Yokōchi (横内 千秋, Yokōchi Chiaki)
Voiced by: Mizuki Wai (Japanese); Dawn M. Bennett (English)
One of the residents at Kaho's dorm. She is serious and level-headed and often serves as a voice of reason. She finds the relationship between Kaho and Kanade to be amusing and frequently teases Shinohara for his personality. She dates and accepts Arashi despite his weird tendencies.
Mafuyu Hayashi (林 真冬, Hayashi Mafuyu)
Voiced by: Ai Kayano (Japanese); Monica Rial (English)
One of the residents at Kaho's dorm. While she tends to be composed on the outside, deep down she has a morbid obsession with Shūgo, going as far as stealing his underwears and sniffing them. When noticed or denied her fetish by others, she can enter into a frenzy where she demonstrates animalistic behavior, which cannot be stopped unless she gets what she wants. When provoked she speaks on a deeply foul language.
Shūgo Takahashi (高橋 修吾, Takahashi Shūgo)
Voiced by: Shunsuke Takeuchi (Japanese); Phil Parsons (English)
Kanade's father and the landlord of the dorm.
Yuki Fukaya (深谷 友基, Fukaya Yūki)
Voiced by: Iori Nomizu (Japanese); Skyler McIntosh (English)
One of Kanade's classmates, who has a crush on him.
Munemitsu Makurazaki (枕崎 宗光, Makurazaki Munemitsu)
Voiced by: Takuya Eguchi (Japanese); Alejandro Saab (English)
A butler for Kazuo.
Renren (レンレン)
Voiced by: Shouta Aoi (Japanese); Aaron Roberts (English)
An androgynous boy, who is also a cross-dressing idol. He's the object of fanaticism by Arashi, much to Chiaki's chagrin.

== Media ==
=== Manga ===
First Love Monster is written by Akira Hiyoshimaru, who began publishing the manga in Kodansha's shōjo magazine Aria on 28 January 2013. Its last chapter in the magazine was published on 28 November 2016. On 3 March 2017, the manga started publishing on Pixiv Comics.

The manga is licensed for English release in North America by Yen Press.

==== Volumes ====
No.	Original release date	Original ISBN	English release date	English ISBN
1	5 July 2013	978-4-06-380638-0	21 July 2015	978-0-3163-4367-1
2	7 January 2014	978-4-06-380666-3	27 October 2015	978-0-316-34610-8
3	7 July 2014	978-4-06-380699-1	26 January 2016	978-0-316-34611-5
4	7 January 2015	978-4-06-380738-7	26 April 2016	978-0-316-31488-6
5	7 July 2015	978-4-06-380781-3	27 September 2016	978-0-316-54526-6
6	13 May 2016	978-4-06-358815-6	24 January 2017	978-0-316-50461-4
7	22 July 2016	978-4-06-380862-9	22 August 2017	978-0-316-47241-8
8	7 February 2017	978-4-06-358815-6	14 November 2017	978-0-316-44255-8

=== Audio drama ===
The limited edition versions of volumes three, four, and five include an audio drama CD.

=== Anime ===
An anime adaptation of the series was announced in the August issue of Aria. The cast of the audio dramas reprised their roles for the anime. The series aired from July to September 2016. Studio Deen produced the anime, with Takayuki Inagaki directed the series and Mariko Oka designed the characters. The anime has been licensed by Funimation and by Madman Entertainment for streaming. Medialink licensed the series in South and Southeast Asia and streaming this anime in their YouTube channel. The anime ran for 12 episodes, released over 6 Blu-ray and DVD volumes. An OVA episode was bundled with the manga's 8th volume and released on 17 February 2017.

==== Episodes ====
No.	Title	Original release date
1	"So: I'm in Primary School. What Now?"; Transliteration: "... De, ore, shōgakuseidakedo dō suru ka?" (Japanese: ...で、俺、小学生だけどどうするか？)	2 July 2016
2	"Ah, Kasumi House"; Transliteration: "Ā Kasumi sō" (Japanese: あゝ華すみ荘)	9 July 2016
3	"It's My First"; Transliteration: "Hajimete no" (Japanese: 初めての)	16 July 2016
4	"Sought-After Undies"; Transliteration: "Nerawa reta pantsu" (Japanese: ねらわれたパンツ)	23 July 2016
5	"I Know--To the Bath House"; Transliteration: "Sōda, sentō ikou" (Japanese: そうだ、銭湯いこう)	30 July 2016
6	"Hula-Hoop Hullabaloo"; Transliteration: "Futte furafurafurafūpu" (Japanese: 振ってフラフラフラフープ)	6 August 2016
7	"Sending My Feeling's... (To the Bathroom)"; Transliteration: "Todoketai omoi... ... (Toireni)" (Japanese: 届けたい思い...... （トイレに）)	13 August 2016
8	"Kanade's Telephone Helpline"; Transliteration: "Sō denwa sōdan-shitsu" (Japanese: 奏電話相談室)	20 August 2016
9	"A Hushed and Crabby Love Song"; Transliteration: "Hiso ya kanirabusongu" (Japanese: ひそやカニラブソング)	27 August 2016
10	"A Proper Rom-Com For Once"; Transliteration: "Tamani wa mattōna rabu kome demo" (Japanese: たまにはまっとうなラブコメでも)	3 September 2016
11	"No Peeking! Kanade's Secret Diary"; Transliteration: "Micha dame! Kanade no himitsu nikki" (Japanese: 見ちゃダメ！奏の秘密日記)	10 September 2016
12	"Adorable/Abnormable"; Transliteration: "Rabunōmaru × abunōmaru" (Japanese: ラブノーマル×アブノーマル)	17 September 2016
OVA	"It'll Continue for a Little While Longer"; Transliteration: "Mō Chotto Dake Tsuzukunja" (Japanese: もうちょっとだけ続くんじゃ)	17 February 2017

=== Novel ===
A novel adaptation written by Makoto Nohara and with illustrations and supervision done by Akira Hiyoshimaru, was published by Kodansha on March 2, 2017. The novel also includes the short story Omae no Koto ga Suki Nan Da (おまえのことが好きなんだ) by doujin author Baku Yumemakurasaki.

=== Stage play ===
A stage play adaptation ran in Shinagawa Prince Hotel's Club eX from March 3 to March 12, 2017. Keita Kawajiri served as director and scriptwriter. The play featured Kokoro Okuda as Kaho Nikaidō, Yoshihiko Aramaki as Kanade Takahashi, Daiki Sagawa as Tomu Kaneko, Yūki Kamisato as Ginjirō Sannomiya, Shane as Kazuo Noguchi, Yūtarō as Kōta Shinohara, Kento Ono as Atsushi Taga, Ryōsei Tanaka as Arashi Nagasawa, Yūta Hoshino as Daikoku Nikaidō, and Naoya Goumoto as Shūgo Takahashi.

== Reception ==
Rebecca Silverman, reviewing the first volume for Anime News Network, gave it an overall grade of C−. She criticized the series for its attempts at serious romance in what was essentially a comedy, and also found fault with author's skill at drawing people. She was most heavily critical of the age gap between the two romantic leads, commenting that upon examination, "First Love Monster's comedy is overwhelmed by its creepy factor." She did, however, praise the series' dialogue, stating that "the way Kanade talks is a fun mixture of childlike and more adult."
