= The Twelve Kingdoms =

Japanese fantasy novel series and its franchise

- Cover of the first book (first volume) of the Kodansha edition, featuring Youko Nakajima

十二国記 (Jūni Kokuki)
- Genre: Epic fantasy; Isekai
- Novel series
- Written by: Fuyumi Ono
- Illustrated by: Akihiro Yamada
- Published by: Kodansha; Shinchosha
- English publisher: NA: Tokyopop (former); Seven Seas Entertainment
- Imprint: X Bunko White Heart; (#1–7); Shinchō Bunko; (#8–present; reprint)
- Original run: 1992 – present
- Volumes: 9
- Anime television series
- Directed by: Tsuneo Kobayashi
- Produced by: Ken Suegawa
- Written by: Shō Aikawa (#1–40); Seiya Fujima (#41–45)
- Music by: Kunihiko Ryo
- Studio: Pierrot
- Licensed by: NA: Media Blasters (former) Discotek Media
- Original network: NHK
- English network: US: ImaginAsian TV
- Original run: April 9, 2002 – August 30, 2003
- Episodes: 45
- icon

The Twelve Kingdoms (Japanese: 十二国記, Hepburn: Jūni Kokuki; also known as "Record of 12 Countries" or "Jūni Kokki") is a series of fantasy novels written by Japanese author Fuyumi Ono and illustrated by Akihiro Yamada. The first entry in the series called The Twelve Kingdoms: Sea of Shadow was published by Kodansha in Japan in 1992; the last Kodansha volume was released in 2001. In 2012, the series was resumed under the Shinchō Bunko line from Shinchosha. Shinchosha has also begun reprinting the older volumes with new cover and interior art from Akihiro Yamada. The first new publication of the series in six years was released in 2019.

An English-language translation was produced and distributed by Tokyopop. The first four volumes were released between March 2007 and November 2010, before the license reverted to Kodansha.

On November 20, 2024, Seven Seas Entertainment announced that they had acquired the license to publish a new translation of the series in English, with the first volume being released in July 2025.

It was adapted into an anime television series by Pierrot in 2002, which aired on Japan's NHK from April 2002 to August 2003. The series was licensed and distributed by Media Blasters in the United States at the time of its initial Japanese broadcast. As of 2019, Discotek Media held the license to the series.

== Plot ==
Youko Nakajima, an unhappy high school student, is one day suddenly faced with a strange man who swears allegiance to her. After a battle with demon-like beasts, he then takes her to another world. There, her appearance has changed and she can understand the language. Her status as "Kaikyaku" (people who come from Earth) makes her a hunted fugitive, so she wanders the land of the 12 countries, simply trying to survive and figure out the reason she was brought to this world. (In the anime, two of her classmates are brought along, and upon getting separated from Youko also face their own challenges.)

=== Setting ===
The Twelve Kingdoms tells several stories from the world of the Twelve Kingdoms. It is located on a group of several islands in another dimension accessible from our world through portals created from naturally occurring magic (though the other way around is normally impossible). The portals occur in the ocean waters of Japan and China, and ever so often will end up dragging someone from our world from those waters to the kingdoms' islands, and/or on rare occasion, pulling an unborn child from the kingdoms into our world, causing them to be born there. On the islands, magic works and societies similar to those of classical Japan and China exist. While the inhabitants of the kingdoms are aware of the existence of our world as the lands of Hourai (Japan) and Kunlun (China), the reverse is not true for any inhabitants of our world. The inhabitants of the kingdoms speak a different language than the languages of our world, both of which can be learned by either side. Only through extraordinary circumstances can the two worlds affect each other to a certain extent.

In this world, there are a total of thirteen lands. At the center of the world lies the Koukai (the Yellow Sea) and Five Mountains where the Gods communicate their will to the Twelve Kingdoms of the world. Each of the Twelve Kingdoms possesses their own ruler and its own Kirin, a divine creature which embodies the will of heaven and is entrusted to choose a kingdom's ruler by Tentei: Emperor of Heaven. The Kirin serves as the ruler's aide. The ruler will have immortal life as long as they keep the kingdom healthy and their heads are not severed from their body. If the ruler's Kirin dies or is killed, the ruler will die within a year.

The Koukai, known as the Yellow Sea, is surrounded by four inland seas: the Black Sea in the north, the Blue Sea to the east, the Red Sea in the south, and the White Sea to the west. Eight of the Twelve Kingdoms (Kei, En, Ryu, Kyou, Han, Sai, Sou, and Kou) border at least one of these four seas, extending from the center like the petals of a flower. The remaining four kingdoms (Tai, Hou, Ren, and Shun) are not part of the central mainland and are isolated by the Kyokai (虚海) (Void Sea) which surrounds the lands of the Twelve Kingdoms.

== Publication ==
There are seven novels in the Twelve Kingdoms series, plus two short story collections. The novels are illustrated by Akihiro Yamada. Some of the novels have been published in two or more volume editions such that the total number of volumes is sixteen (as originally released in Japan).

Book	Kanji title	Romaji title	Original title, literal translation	Notes
Book	Publication date	ISBN	English publication title (Tokyopop / Seven Seas Entertainment)	Notes
Book	Summary			Notes
1	月の影 影の海	Tsuki no Kage, Kage no Umi	Shadow of the Moon, Sea of Shadow	2 volumes
1	June 1992 (Kodansha Volume 1); July 1992 (Kodansha Volume 2); July 2012 (Shinchosha reprint Volume 1); July 2012 (Shinchosha reprint Volume 2)	978-4-06-255071-0 (Kodansha Volume 1); 978-4-06-255072-7 (Kodansha Volume 2); 978-4-10-124053-4 (Shinchosha reprint Volume 1); 978-4-10-124052-7 (Shinchosha reprint Volume 2)	The Twelve Kingdoms: Sea of Shadow; The Twelve Kingdoms Book 1/2 – Shadow of the Moon, Shadow of the Sea	2 volumes
1	Yoko becomes the monarch of Kei.			2 volumes
2	風の海 迷宮の岸	Kaze no Umi, Meikyū no Kishi	Sea of Wind, Shore of the Labyrinth	2 volumes (Kodansha release); 1 volume (Shinchosha reprint)
2	March 1993 (Kodansha Volume 1); April 1993 (Kodansha Volume 2); October 2012 (Shinchosha reprint)	978-4-06-255114-4 (Kodansha Volume 1); 978-4-06-255120-5 (Kodansha Volume 2); 978-4-10-124054-1 (Shinchosha reprint)	The Twelve Kingdoms: Sea of Wind; The Twelve Kingdoms Book 3 – Sea of Wind, Shore of the Labyrinth	2 volumes (Kodansha release); 1 volume (Shinchosha reprint)
2	Taiki chooses the ruler of Tai			2 volumes (Kodansha release); 1 volume (Shinchosha reprint)
3	東の海神 西の滄海	Higashi no Wadatsumi, Nishi no Sōkai	Sea God in the East, Vast Sea in the West	1 volume
3	June 1994 (Kodansha release); January 2013 (Shinchosha reprint)	978-4-06-255168-7 (Kodansha release); 978-4-10-124055-8 (Shinchosha reprint)	The Twelve Kingdoms: The Vast Spread of the Seas; The Twelve Kingdoms Book 4 – Sea God in the East, Vast Sea in the West	1 volume
3	The King of En suppresses a rebellion.			1 volume
4	風の万里 黎明の空	Kaze no Banri, Reimei no Sora	A Thousand Miles of Wind, the Sky at Dawn	2 volumes
4	July 1994 (Kodansha Volume 1); September 1994 (Kodansha Volume 2); April 2013 (Shinchosha reprint Volume 1); April 2013 (Shinchosha reprint Volume 2)	978-4-06-255175-5 (Kodansha Volume 1); 978-4-06-255178-6 (Kodansha Volume 2); 978-4-10-124057-2 (Shinchosha reprint Volume 1); 978-4-10-124056-5 (Shinchosha reprint Volume 2)	The Twelve Kingdoms: Skies of Dawn; The Twelve Kingdoms Book 5/6 – A Thousand Miles of Wind, the Sky at Dawn	2 volumes
4	Yoko, Suzu and Shoukei free the Wa Province in Kei			2 volumes
5	図南の翼	Tonan no Tsubasa	The Aspiring Wings	1 volume
5	February 1996 (Kodansha release); October 2013 (Shinchosha reprint)	978-4-06-255229-5 (Kodansha release); 978-4-10-124059-6 (Shinchosha reprint)	The Twelve Kingdoms Book 8 – The Aspiring Wings	1 volume
5	Shushou becomes ruler of Kyou.			1 volume
6	黄昏の岸 暁の天	Tasogare no Kishi, Akatsuki no Sora	The Shore at Twilight, the Sky at Daybreak	2 volumes (Kodansha release); 1 volume (Shinchosha reprint)
6	May 2001 (Kodansha release both volumes); April 2014 (Shinchosha reprint)	978-4-06-255546-3 (Kodansha Volume 1); 978-4-06-255550-0 (Kodansha Volume 2); 978-4-10-124061-9 (Shinchosha reprint)		2 volumes (Kodansha release); 1 volume (Shinchosha reprint)
6	Risai meets Yoko to request help in finding Taiki.			2 volumes (Kodansha release); 1 volume (Shinchosha reprint)
7	華胥の幽夢	Kasho no Yume	The Dream of Prosperity	1 volume
7	September 2001 (Kodansha release); January 2014 (Shinchosha reprint)	978-4-06-255573-9 (Kodansha release); 978-4-10-124060-2 (Shinchosha reprint)	The Twelve Kingdoms Book 9 – The Dream of Prosperity	1 volume
7	Five short stories, set in Tai, Hou, Kei, Sai and Sou: "Toei" (冬栄), "Jogetsu" (乗月), "Shokan" (書簡), "Kasho" (華胥), "Kizan" (帰山)			1 volume
8	丕緒の鳥	Hisho no Tori	The Birds of Hisho	1 volume
8	July 2013 (Shinchosha release)	978-4-10-124058-9 (Shinchosha release)	The Twelve Kingdoms Book 7 – The Birds of Hisho	1 volume
8	Four short stories set in Kei, Ryu, and other locations in the Twelve Kingdoms: "Hisho no Tori" (丕緒の鳥), "Rakushou no Goku" (落照の獄), "Seijou no Ran" (青条の蘭), and "Fuushin" (風信).			1 volume
9	白銀の墟 玄の月	Hakugin no Oka, Kuro no Tsuki	Silver Ruins, Black Moon	4 volumes
9	October 2019 (Shinchosha Volume 1); October 2019 (Shinchosha Volume 2); November 2019 (Shinchosha Volume 3); November 2019 (Shinchosha Volume 4)	978-4101240626 (Shinchosha Volume 1); 978-4101240633 (Shinchosha Volume 2); 978-4101240640 (Shinchosha Volume 3); 978-4101240657 (Shinchosha Volume 4)		4 volumes
9	Six years after Gyousou disappeared, based on the barest sliver of hope from Taiki's claim that he is still alive, they begin the long search.			4 volumes

Before she started work on Twelve Kingdoms, Fuyumi Ono wrote The Demonic Child (魔性の子, Mashō no Ko) (Kodansha: September 1991, ISBN 978-4-10-124021-3; Shinchosha reprint: July 2012, ISBN 978-4-10-124051-0), a horror novel about a boy from another world. She later worked certain events from this novel into the Twelve Kingdoms series. Short stories set in the various kingdoms include "Kasho" (華胥), "Toei" (冬栄), "Shokan" (書簡), "Kizan" (帰山) and "Jogetsu" (乗月); these stories have been collected into one volume, Kasho no Yume. One short story, "Drifting Ship" (漂舶, Hyouhaku), published in 1997, accompanied the drama CD for Sea God in the East, Vast Sea in the West and remains uncollected elsewhere. In February 2008, a new Twelve Kingdoms short story, "The Birds of Hisho" (丕緒の鳥, Hisho no Tori) was published in Shinchosha's Yomyom magazine, followed by "Rakushou no Goku" (落照の獄) in September 2009. The Birds of Hisho and Rakushou no Goku were later collected into a volume of short stories titled The Birds of Hisho, along with two new previously unpublished stories, "Seijou no Ran" (青条の蘭) and "Fuushin" (風信), in 2013.

=== U.S. release ===
==== Tokyopop ====
In 2006, U.S. publisher Tokyopop acquired the rights to publish the novels under its "Pop Fiction" imprint. The first book was released in March 2007. Only the first four books were released before the license expired.

Title	Publication date	ISBN
The Twelve Kingdoms: Sea of Shadow	March 2007 (hardcover); February 2008 (paperback)	978-1-59816-946-1; 978-1-4278-0257-6
The Twelve Kingdoms: Sea of Wind	March 2008 (hardcover); February 2009 (paperback)	978-1-59816-947-8; 978-1-4278-0258-3
The Twelve Kingdoms: The Vast Spread of the Seas	March 2009 (hardcover); November 2009 (paperback)	978-1-59816-948-5; 978-1-4278-0259-0
The Twelve Kingdoms: Skies of Dawn	March 2010 (hardcover); November 2010 (paperback)	978-1-59816-949-2; 978-1-4278-0260-6

==== Seven Seas Entertainment ====
In November 2024, Seven Seas Entertainment announced that they had acquired the license to publish the novels in paperback with a new translation under their "Airship" imprint. The first volume was released in July 2025. They also said they consulted with the author on the release order and it will be different from the Japanese order.

Title	Publication date	ISBN
The Twelve Kingdoms Book 1 – Shadow of the Moon, Shadow of the Sea: Part 1	July 1, 2025	979-8-89373-446-1
The Twelve Kingdoms Book 2 – Shadow of the Moon, Shadow of the Sea: Part 2	October 14, 2025	979-8-89373-779-0
The Twelve Kingdoms Book 3 – Sea of Wind, Shore of the Labyrinth	December 2, 2025	979-8-89373-780-6
The Twelve Kingdoms Book 4 – Sea God in the East, Vast Sea in the West	March 3, 2026	979-8-89373-781-3
The Twelve Kingdoms Book 5 – A Thousand Miles of Wind, the Sky at Dawn: Part 1	June 2, 2026	979-8-89373-778-3
The Twelve Kingdoms Book 6 – A Thousand Miles of Wind, the Sky at Dawn: Part 2	September 1, 2026	979-8-89373-778-3
The Twelve Kingdoms Book 7 – The Birds of Hisho	November 24, 2026	979-8-8956-1411-2
The Twelve Kingdoms Book 8 – The Aspiring Wings	February 9, 2027	979-8-89765-029-3
The Twelve Kingdoms Book 9 – The Dream of Prosperity	May 4, 2027	979-8-89765-030-9

== Media ==
=== Anime ===
The anime adaptation by studio Pierrot aired from April 9, 2002, to August 30, 2003, in Japan on NHK for forty-five episodes. The opening theme is "Juunigenmukyoku" by Kunihiko Ryo while the ending theme is "Getsumei-Fuuei" by Mika Arisaka. The anime series has been released on DVD and Blu-ray in the United States by Media Blasters, which are now out of print. The license was transferred to Discotek Media, who released the complete series on Blu-ray in 2019.

=== Animanga ===
Kodansha printed a fifteen-volume "animanga" series in 2002–2004 by combining images from the anime series with printed dialogue and sound effects. It has been released only in Japanese.

=== Video games ===
Konami has released in Japan two games based on Twelve Kingdoms, both produced by Takashi Shimomichi. They are Juuni Kokuki: Guren no Shirube Koujin no Michi and Juuni Kokuki: Kakukakutaru Oudou Kouryoku no Uka. Both games contain footage from the anime and many stills of the characters are used during conversation and during battle. The games are sprite-based, with small sprites used on-screen and larger, highly animated sprites used during battle.

Juuni Kokuki: Guren no Shirube Koujin no Michi was released for PlayStation 2 on August 28, 2003. It follows Yoko's journey to becoming Empress of Kei. While classified as an RPG, it is often described as an adventure game. The game was re-released in Konami's The Best lineup on June 9, 2004. Yoko is capable of summoning Keiki's Shirei into battle as well as having additional party members.

Juuni Kokuki: Kakukakutaru Oudou Kouryoku no Uka was released for PlayStation 2 on April 4, 2004, and is a sequel to the first game, continuing with Yoko's problems after she becomes the monarch of Kei. Game data from the first game can be loaded into the second. This game contains more RPG elements than the first with party-/menu-based battles becoming standard. Many of the event scenes are pulled from the novels but there are also scenes made just for the game.

=== Musical ===
In February 2025 the novel was announced to be turned into a musical. It adapted the first arc, Shadow of the Moon, Sea of Shadow. The musical opened in December 2025 at Nissay Theatre in Tokyo, before moving through Fukuoka, Osaka, and Aichi in the following January and February. The musical was directed by Kazuya Yamada, with scripting and song lyrics by Tsuneyasu Motoyoshi, and music composition by Erika Fukusawa. The role of Youko Nakajima was double-cast, with a different actress depending on the world she is in. The announced cast list is as follows:

- Youko Nakajima played by Rei Yuzuka / Ririka Kato
- Rakushun played by Motohiro Ota / Hikaru Makishima
- Aozaru played by Yukji Tamaki
- Joei played by Maaya Harada
- Enou played by Shohei
- Keiki played by Hiroki Aiba

== Reception ==
By March 2020, the novel series had over 12 million copies in circulation.
