= Kiss of the Rose Princess =

Japanese manga series

- Cover of the first volume

薔薇嬢のキス (Bara jō no Kisu)
- Genre: Romance, supernatural
- Manga
- Written by: Aya Shouoto
- Published by: Kadokawa Shoten
- English publisher: Viz Media
- Magazine: Monthly Asuka
- Original run: June 24, 2008 – January 25, 2012
- Volumes: 9

Kiss of Rose Princess (薔薇嬢のキス, Bara jō no Kisu) is a manga series created by Aya Shouoto. The manga was published by Kadokawa Shoten and serialized in Monthly Asuka magazine on June 24, 2008. The English translation is published by Viz Media; it is the first volume released on November 4, 2014.

== Story ==
High-school girl Anise Yamamoto is a normal teenager, save for a mysterious rose choker around her neck gifted to her by her father Schwartz, claiming that it was a protective amulet and if she ever took it off a "punishment" would be granted. A turn of mysterious events causes her to lose the choker, and in turn gain four coloured cards. With the help of her teacher Narumi Itsushi, she is introduced to the Rose Rhode Knights, four handsome knights that emerge when called by a kiss on their respective cards: red, black, white and blue. Anise is named the Rose Princess, the master of these knights, who are revealed to be her schoolmates Kaede Higa, Mutsuki Kuruma, Mitsuru Tenjō, and Seiran Asagi. As the Rose Princess, she was once tasked with commanding the Rhode Rose Knights to defeat the Devil that was once unleashed upon the world at the cost of her blood's strength (since the knights operate using it). As the Devil had already been sealed away, Anise utilises their power to help her find her rose choker before Schwartz finds out. Through these petty missions, she gradually develops close relations with each of them, each with their own differing personalities.

Anise's childhood friend Haruto Kisugi soon transfers into their school, but he is actually a spy for Schwartz and a former Knight with the title of Yellow Rose until his life force was used to create the Devil's Seal that locks away the Devil. Wrecked with jealousy and love for Anise, he informs Schwartz about her loss of the choker and the recent turn of events, causing the former to immediately return home. Seiran's identity as the Blue Rose is questioned as he reveals himself to be a homunculus created to replace Haruto after he had been betrayed by the remaining three Knights, and also to be the next sacrifice should the Devil's Seal ever crumble, which it has since Haruto had regained life mysteriously. The reason is later shown to be Schwartz's doing, and his aim is to destroy the Devil's Seal and unleash it, whilst the choker was designed to prevent Anise's identity as the Rose Princess from showing.

After convincing Seiran not to sacrifice himself, Haruto decides to sacrifice himself instead willingly to atone for his sins of previously trying to become the True Rose, the only Knight that will overpower the rest. To temporarily stabilise the Devil's Seal, Anise performs the True Contract with the four Knights, which increases each of their abilities and will continue to do so without using up blood through three "Awakenings" formed from the strength of each's Knight's bond with Anise. To restore the seal, they set out in search of fragments that were blasted away, in the form of Arcana Cards. Through the quest, they meet their new adversaries posing as the artificial replicas of each of them sent by Schwartz: idols Idel Suzumura and Yakoh Hazusaki, the Orange Rose and Lime Rose respectively; Mutsuki's former older brother Yocteau, the Grey Rose; Mikage Hiiragi, or Cinderella as their fake Rose Princess. Mutsuki also recovers his lost memories and faces Yocteau, the person he once loved the most.

After restoring all the Arcana Cards, the Knights also gain their own Awakenings with Anise, mostly to the third out of four stages or so. Anise's past is also shown as Schwartz is displayed in a more positive light. Returning to high school life with each of the boys, Anise no longer wears the rose choker, but wields the cards proudly and develops a romantic attraction to Kaede.

== Characters ==
Anise Yamamoto (八麻本アニス, Yamamoto Anisu)
Voiced by: Aya Hirano (Drama CD)
The protagonist of the story. A beautiful and cheerful first-year high school student. To cover her identity as the Rose Princess, her father Schwartz gave her a rose choker, telling her that it was a protective amulet and a punishment would befall her if she ever took it off. She was unable to take it off until it disappeared when Ninufa bowled her over, receiving the red card of the Rose Rhode Knights by accident from it. From there, Anise's normal high school life turns upside down as she discovers her true identity and learns of the many truths surrounding herself and her Knights.
Although Anise seems frivolous on the outside, she is obliged to her sense of duty as the Rose Princess and treasures each of her Knights for who they are, developing close relations with each of them. Her ultimate goal is to set all of the Knights free from their heavy burdens.
Kaede Higa (緋賀楓, Higa Kaede)
Voiced by: Yūichi Nakamura (Drama CD)
Kaede is the Red Rose, the Rhode Rose Knight called forth from the red card. He is classmates with Anise and seems to dislike her initially for beating him in a sports festival, but in reality shows himself to deeply care for her. He has lived in a shrine where he trains since he was a child, near Seiran's rose mansion where the both of them are childhood friends. Kaede falls in love with Anise as the series progresses, being easily jealous and protective of her. His powers as a Knight specialize in combat.
Mutsuki Kurama (蔵間無月, Kurama Mutsuki)
Voiced by: Kenjirō Tsuda (Drama CD)
Mutsuki is the Black Rose, the Rhode Rose Knight called forth from the black card. With his dark manner and frightening aura around him, most of the students are scared of him but Anise learns that he is actually a kind person. Initially, he is reluctant to accept her as his master, but eventually grows to love and care for her. Apart from Seiran, he is not human, but instead a "Dark Stalker", a race that has the power to commune with nature and live longer than humans -- a fact he likes to reinforce to show superiority to the other Knights. His powers as a Knight specialize in investigation and searching, which Anise fully utilizes to find her rose choker.
Despite his brooding demeanor, Mutsuki has no memories of his past and is the last of his race. His past is later recovered when he killed his brother Yocteau after the Devil's Seal broke and the latter was driven to insanity from the power. His regret and unwillingness to let go of his past haunted him when Yocteau is resurrected by Schwartz as one of the fake Knights -- Grey Rose. He has connections with Mitsuru, who treats and monitors him.
Mitsuru Tenjō (天上光琉, Tenjō Mitsuru)
Voiced by: Hiroshi Kamiya (Drama CD)
Mitsuru is the White Rose, the Rhode Rose Knight called forth from the white card. At school, he is the handsome and dashing student council president, making him popular among students, but his true nature is that of a masochist and an embarrassment to Anise as he is very devoted and outspoken about his duties. He likes to outwardly display his affection for Anise, making her embarrassed and the subject of envy among her schoolmates that likewise adore him. His powers as a Knight specialize in healing. He is also the representative of Tengoku Church, a base run by the Society that oversees the Devil's Seal and the Rosette Contracts binding the Knights to the Rose Princess. With his noble lineage, he is very rich. Later in the series, it is revealed that he is actually blood-related to Anise when his family attempted to keep the Rose Princess heritage under their bloodline and control.
Seiran Asagi (浅木晴嵐, Asagi Seiran)
Voiced by: Jun Fukuyama (Drama CD)
Seiran is the Blue Rose, the Rhode Rose Knight called forth from the blue card. At school, he is popular for being cute and innocent, but frequently doesn't show up due to an illness, which is ironically hinted to just be a rose allergy. He and Kaede are childhood friends as they live near each other. Like the other Knights, he loves Anise dearly. His powers as a Knight specializes in alchemy or science.
It is later revealed that Seiran is a homunculus created to replace the Yellow Rose when the latter was used to power the Devil's Seal as well as a means of restoration for the seal should it ever crumble. Thus, the past memories held by Kaede are all fake hallucinations.
Itsushi Narumi (鳴海イツシ, Narumi Itsushi)
Voiced by: Takahiro Mizushima (Drama CD)
Narumi is the Classics teacher in Anise's school, located at a basement library. Being a former apprentice of Schwartz, he is well-informed about the duties of the Rose Princess and her responsibility of holding up the Devil's Seal and commanding her Knights.
Ninufa (ニヌファ)
Voiced by: Nobuhiko Okamoto (Drama CD)
Ninufa is a bat-like creature, Narumi's pet, and the guardians of the cards until the Knights get a new master. He is responsible for the chain of events that led to Anise discovering her identity as the Rose Princess. Although his normal appearance is that of a bat, he can also transform into a dragon and speaks with a slight accent. Among the four Knights, he is the closest to Seiran.
Schwartz Yamamoto (八麻本シュヴァルツ, Yamamoto Shuvarutsu)
Voiced by: Ken Narita (Drama CD)
Schwartz is Anise's father and a famed sorcerer, later revealed to be the Silver Rose, a fake Knight. He gave his daughter the rose choker warning her against taking it off lest a punishment befall her. After being exposed as their main enemy, he returns home with the job of the school nurse to inspect the Knights' abilities. He is also the main antagonist of the story in his goal to break the Devil's Seal. When he is kidnapped by the Society, Anise declares her trust that he is able to take care of himself, making him proud as a father through this show of her growth.
Schwartz is later revealed to be Anise's foster-father, while Anise's real mother was blood-related to the Tenjō family and foretold to give birth to the next Rose Princess. Due to that, despite their mutual love, Anise's mother was married off to another person but entrusted Anise to him. As Anise greatly resembles the woman he once loved, he is very overprotective of her and that led to his creating of the rose choker to suppress her identity, hiding her from the hands of the Society.
Haruto Kisugi (来生ハルト, Kisugi Haruto)
Voiced by: Mamoru Miyano (Drama CD)
Haruto is the Yellow Rose, the Rhode Rose Knight once called forth from the yellow card. Because of betrayal by the other three Knights, his life force was used to power the Devil's Seal. Returning thanks to Schwartz, he became Anise's elementary schoolmate. They were very close, until going to separate high schools. Becoming Schwartz's spy and underling, he transfers to Anise's school to confirm her missing choker and at the same time exact revenge on the Knights, especially Kaede who once became the True Rose, a Knight that overpowered the rest, instead of him. Due to his past self, he is sadistic and cruel, but upholds a sense of justice in his attempt to atone for his sins by entering the Devil's Seal. The entry does not kill him, and he instead winds up in Hong Kong, with a postcard to Anise to prove it. Like the four Knights, he loves Anise. He continues to work for Schwartz after being retrieved from Hong Kong.
Idel Suzumura (鈴村イデル, Suzumura Ideru)
Idel is a pop idol of the group Rhodecia, together with his best friend Yakoh. Enrolling together in Anise's school, he becomes a temporary Rose Rhode Knight under the title of Orange Rose from Schwartz, hoping to gain the power to save Yakoh from his long-term illness. As a temporary Knight, he specializes in using his voice as destructive sound waves. Apart from being an idol, he enjoys playing games and is very chatty.
Yakoh Hasuzaki (蓮崎夜香, Hasuzaki Yakō)
Yakoh is a pop idol of the group Rhodecia, together with his best friend Idel. Enrolling together in Anise's school, he becomes a temporary Rose Rhode Knight under the title of Lime Rose from Schwartz. He generally wears a tired or gentle expression. Unlike Idel, he is very calm and reserved in any situation. As a temporary Knight, he uses fragrance to manipulate others.
Yocteau (ヨクト, Yokuto)
Mutsuki's older brother despite physically looking like a young child. The reason for this is because he was resurrected from just an eyeball. He possesses the power to summon strong demons, but they turn to dust because the strain on Yocteau's body is too much. Since his resurrection Yocteau is emotionally unstable and obsessed with his younger brother. In chapter 29 Yocteau crashes a ball for student councils (that Mutsuki, Anise, Kaede, and Seiran were also attending) and causes a blackout which allows Mutsuki a chance to be alone with Anise. After Mutsuki is rejected by Anise, Yocteau offers Mutsuki a collar that will free him from "the thorns of her (Anise's) commands."
The reason why Mutsuki killed Yocteau is later revealed in the final chapters, where Mutsuki grew attached to Anise.
Mikage Hiiragi (柊みかげ, Hīragi Mikage)
Mikage is better known as Cinderella, Ella and Domina Galacta, is the Artificial equivalent of Anise, complete with four Rose Cards, contracting her to four artificial Rose Rhode Knights. In class, Mikage is known to be a quiet and lonely girl, who seems to have an obsession of Kaede. As Domina, she still has her obsession of Kaede, but she is charismatic. Mikage has blue eyes and purple hair. Her hair is tied into ponytails or braided when she comes to school. Mikage likes to mutter the phrase "I want him, I want him", which is referring to Kaede, whom she has an obsession with him to the point of thinking of kidnapping him from Anise. She seems to lack leadership skills as she is often bullied by her knights. As Anise was late for class, she was left with no one to partner with except for Kaede.
However, her classmates suggested to partner Mikage and Kaede as she was always alone. So, Anise sabotaged Kaede to become the art muse while Mikage and she drew out Kaede asleep. While Anise ran off in finding Mutsuki. Mikage talks to the sleeping Kaede, saying her words "I want him I want him so badly." and seemingly leans down to kiss Kaede. When Anise returns to where they were situated, Mikage asks Anise to do a favor for her: get Kaede to go on a date with her. On her date with Kaede, she acts as a normal girl, being thrilled on having the chance to go out with the boy of her dreams. Finally, at the ferry wheel ride does she start to give away her true motive.
When the Arcana Cards start to activate, Mikage pretends to be one of the helpless bystanders and clings onto Kaede's arm to ensure that he does not try to escape from her reach and protect Anise. She screams, claiming that she was afraid of what was happening. Bought in by Mikage's act and being a gentleman, Kaede decides to stay put.
Anise's Mother
Anise's Mother only appears in the flashbacks of Schwartz. It is not known if she is still alive or not. Her name has not been revealed. She looks exactly like Anise, only looking more mature and grown up with slightly longer and less bouncy hair. She is shown wearing dresses only. It was not said how she meant Schwartz but the two were very in love. She would often run away from the castle she stays at to be with Schwartz. Once, she made her entrance by jumping off a tree and landing on Schwartz. She tells Schwartz that she hates her family because many tried her like a prize because her child, whoever the father is, would become the Rose Dominion Princess, be it a male or female. One day, while the two of them were together, she was forcefully taken away by her family from Schwartz and not seen for a long time. While she was being taken away, she screamed out for Schwartz.
Years later, she reappears at the doorsteps of Schwartz's house, carrying a baby. It turns out that the baby is her daughter and she begged him to take care of her daughter. She also begged Schwartz not to let her daughter know of her true status. After giving her daughter to Schwartz, Anise's Mother was never seen again.

== See also ==
- He's My Only Vampire — Another manga series by the same author
- The Demon Prince of Momochi House — Another manga series by the same author
