= Saiyuki: Journey West =

1999 video game

- North American cover art
- Developer: Koei
- Publisher: Koei
- Director: Minoru Honda
- Designer: Minoru Honda
- Artist: Akihiro Yamada
- Platform: PlayStation
- Release: JP: November 11, 1999; NA: August 13, 2001
- Genre: Tactical role-playing game
- Mode: Single player

Saiyuki: Journey West (Note: known in Japan as Journey to the West (西遊記, Saiyūki)) is a tactical role-playing video game released for the Sony PlayStation by Koei. It is based loosely on the Chinese novel Journey to the West.

== Plot ==
The game follows the basic outline of the Journey to the West's plot, in which the main character, a Buddhist practitioner named Sanzo, travels from China to India on a religious mission and has a variety of adventures along the way.

== Gameplay ==
Sanzo can be played as either a male or a female character at the player's choice. Every character except Sanzo can transform into a monstrous form for a limited time. Instead of transforming, Sanzo has access to summon spells that each boost the party's stats in different ways for a number of rounds and allows him/her to use an extra spell at will. Furthermore, each character has a native element that powers their spells and weakens them to opposing elements.

== Reception ==
Reception

Aggregate score
Aggregator	Score
Metacritic	73/100

Review scores
Publication	Score
AllGame	3.5/5
Electronic Gaming Monthly	8/10
EP Daily	7.5/10
Famitsu	31/40
Game Informer	8.5/10
GameSpot	8.1/10
IGN	8.4/10
Next Generation	4/5
Official U.S. PlayStation Magazine	3.5/5
RPGamer	7/10

The game received "average" reviews according to the review aggregation website Metacritic. Eric Bratcher of NextGen said that the game "won't dazzle your eyes, but with compelling characters, a unique setting and plot, and nice tactical depth, it's still a grand experience." In Japan, Famitsu gave it a score of 31 out of 40. However, Four-Eyed Dragon of GamePro called it "an unsuccessful attempt to make a popular Chinese literary legend come alive." (Note: GamePro gave the game 2/5 for graphics, 4/5 for sound, 3.5/5 for control, and 2.5/5 for fun factor.)

The game was nominated for "Best Game No One Played" at GameSpot's Best and Worst of 2001 Awards, which went to Victorious Boxers: Ippo's Road to Glory. It was also a nominee at The Electric Playground's 2001 Blister Awards for "PSX Game of the Year", but lost to Dragon Quest VII: Fragments of the Forgotten Past.
