= Ghost Hunt (novel series) =

Japanese light novel series

- Cover of the first volume of the original light novel featuring Mai Taniyama (center) and Kazuya Shibuya (top)

ゴーストハント (Gōsuto Hanto)
- Genre: Horror, Occult detective, Mystery
- Light novel

Akuryō Series
- Written by: Fuyumi Ono
- Published by: Kodansha
- Imprint: X Bunko Teens Heart
- Original run: August 5, 1989 – October 5, 1992
- Volumes: 8
- Light novel
- Written by: Fuyumi Ono
- Published by: Kodansha
- Imprint: X Bunko White Heart
- Original run: March 1994 – April 1994
- Volumes: 2
- Manga
- Written by: Shiho Inada
- Published by: Kodansha
- English publisher: NA: Del Rey Manga; UK: Tanoshimi
- Magazine: Amie; Nakayoshi
- Original run: July 7, 1998 – September 30, 2010
- Volumes: 12
- Anime television series
- Directed by: Akira Mano
- Written by: Tsutomu Kamishiro
- Music by: Toshio Masuda
- Studio: J.C.Staff
- Licensed by: NA: Funimation
- Original network: TXN (TV Tokyo)
- Original run: October 3, 2006 – March 27, 2007
- Episodes: 25
- Manga

Akumu no Sumu Ie: Ghost Hunt
- Written by: Shiho Inada
- Published by: Kodansha
- Magazine: Aria
- Original run: July 28, 2012 – July 28, 2016
- Volumes: 3

Ghost Hunt (Japanese: ゴーストハント, Hepburn: Gōsuto Hanto), originally titled Akuryō Series (悪霊シリーズ), is a light novel series written by Fuyumi Ono. It follows the adventures of Shibuya Psychic Research (SPR) as they investigate mysterious occurrences all over Japan with a team of spiritualists and researchers. The series is noted for its blending of Japanese folklore, modern parapsychology, and Shin-honkaku (new orthodox) mystery logic.

The novels were adapted into a radio drama in 1997 and a long-running manga by Shiho Inada. An anime television series by J.C.Staff aired in 2006. In 2021, Kodansha began a new commemorative reprint of the original novels to celebrate the 30th anniversary of the series' conclusion.

== Plot ==
The series follows the ghost hunting adventures of Mai Taniyama, a high school student who becomes an assistant to Kazuya Shibuya, the teen manager of Shibuya Psychic Research (SPR). Mai nicknames him "Naru" due to his narcissistic personality. The team investigates cases involving poltergeists, curses, and malevolent spirits, utilizing a mix of high-tech equipment and traditional religious exorcisms (Buddhist, Shinto, Christian, and Taoist).

A recurring element is Mai's "latent psychic abilities", which manifest as postcognitive dreams. In these dreams, she is often guided by a "spirit guide" who resembles Naru but possesses a gentler disposition. It is eventually revealed that this guide is actually Naru's deceased twin brother, Eugene.

=== Story Arcs (Files) ===
The narrative is divided into distinct "Files", each representing a major investigation:

- File 1: Evil Spirits All Over?! – Investigation of a haunted old school building where Mai first meets the SPR team.
- File 2: The Doll House – A poltergeist case involving a child's doll that has begun to dominate a young girl's personality.
- File 3: After School Hexer – A high school plagued by a series of ritualistic curses following a student's suicide.
- File 4: Ghost Story in the Park – A series of supernatural sightings in a public park involving a spirit that pours water on couples.
- File 5: Silent Christmas – A tragic case at a church where a ghost child seeks a playmate by possessing others.
- File 6: Forbidden Pastime – Students using divination games (Kokkuri-san) inadvertently summon a malevolent force.
- File 7: The Bloodstained Labyrinth – A massive mansion investigation based on the Winchester Mystery House, involving a "vampire" count and hidden rooms.
- File 8: The Cursed House – The final investigation of the original series, involving a family curse and the revelation of Naru's true identity as Oliver Davis.

== Characters ==
=== Main characters ===
- Mai Taniyama (谷山 麻衣, Taniyama Mai): A 16-year-old student who becomes an SPR assistant to repay a debt. As the series progresses, she develops postcognitive dreams and clairvoyance. She develops a complex romantic interest in Naru and his "dream version."
- Kazuya Shibuya (渋谷 一也, Shibuya Kazuya): Known as "Naru", he is the brilliant but arrogant 17-year-old manager of SPR. He is later revealed to be Oliver Davis, a world-renowned psychic from England. He possesses immense psychokinesis, but using it causes severe physical strain on his body.
- Lin Kōujo (林 興徐, Rin Kōjo): An onmyoji from Hong Kong and Naru's guardian. He is skilled in summoning familiars (shiki). He initially harbors a dislike for Japanese people due to historical conflicts, a sentiment Mai eventually helps him soften.
- Hōshō Takigawa (滝川 法生, Takigawa Hōshō): A 25-year-old Buddhist monk from Mt. Koya who plays bass in a rock band. He serves as a mentor and older brother figure to Mai.
- Ayako Matsuzaki (松崎 綾子, Matsuzaki Ayako): A 23-year-old miko (shrine maiden) whose powers are tied to spirits residing in living trees.
- John Brown (ジョン·ブラウン, Jon Buraun): A 19-year-old Catholic priest from Australia who performs exorcisms using holy water and scripture.
- Masako Hara (原 真砂子, Hara Masako): A celebrity medium who can channel spirits. She is one of the few who initially suspects Naru's true identity.

== Media ==
=== Light novels ===
The series was originally published as the Akuryō Series (1989–1992) and continued with the Ghost Hunt series (1994). In 2010 and 2021, revised editions were released to update technology and terminology for modern readers.

==== Akuryō Series ====
No.	Title	Japanese release date	Japanese ISBN
1	There are lots of Evil Spirits?! 悪霊がいっぱい!?	August 5, 1989	978-4-06-190311-1
2	There are really lots of Evil Spirits! 悪霊がホントにいっぱい!	November 5, 1989	978-4-06-190365-4
8	I don't mind Evil Spirits 2 悪霊だってヘイキ!(下)	October 5, 1992	978-4-06-198697-8

=== Manga ===
A sequel manga, Akumu no Sumu Ie (The House Where Nightmares Dwell), was published in Aria from 2012 to 2016. It serves as a direct conclusion to the events of the light novels, investigating a haunted house plagued by the spirits of a murdered family.

=== Anime ===
The anime adaptation covers the first six Files of the series. Despite the manga continuing through File 8, no second season has been produced as of 2026, though the series remains a cult favorite on streaming platforms.

=== Live action film ===
In November 2013, a live action film was announced starring Maya Fukuzawa. After years of production delays and the passing of original cast choices, the project was reportedly rebooted in 2020 by Warner Bros. Japan. However, as of 2026, the film has not been released and is considered to be in "development hell."

== Reception ==
The series has been praised for its "fair-play" approach to the supernatural, where the ghosts follow specific, logical rules that the characters (and readers) can deduce. ActiveAnime's Sandra Scholes commends the anime for its "roots deep in Japanese mythology and history."

Critics have occasionally noted the "noticeable slide in quality" in later manga volumes during the transition to direct-to-tankōbon releases. However, the 2021 reprints were met with renewed critical acclaim, with reviewers noting that Fuyumi Ono's horror elements remain effective and "genuinely terrifying" even decades later.
