= GEAR (theatre show) =

Japanese non-verbal theatre show

GEAR (Japanese: ギア) is a Japanese long-running non-verbal theatre show that originates in Kyoto and incorporates elements of technology, skilled performance arts. It is the first long-run show with original content in Japan.

== History ==
GEAR was first created by Art Complex in Osaka as a project of the Osaka Regional Arts and Cultural Promotion Project Plan. After several successful runs promoted by different cultural affairs agencies in the Kansai region, it opened as a long run show in a specially designated theatre in downtown Kyoto in April 2012. It is currently in its fifth year of performances.

== Content ==
GEAR follows four robots who work in a falling-apart toy factory in the distant future. An electrical accident brings one of the dolls they manufacture to life, and Doll and Robots learn together the value of play and humanity. Each robot discovers a special skill they have, and so the show gradually incorporates mime, juggling, breakdance, and magic.

Much of the design for GEAR, costumes and visual style is by Kyoto-based Manga artist Akihiro Yamada, which lends an idiosyncratic look to the show.

Another distinguishing mark of GEAR is the extensive use of stage technology. Projection mapping is used extensively, as are lasers, an LED dress, and moving lighting. In the words of Japan Times reviewer Andrew Eglinton:

In contrast, the production was lent a particularly powerful dimension through projection-mapping technology that allowed the crew to project light and video designs onto isolated parts of the Modernist factory to create the impression of a futuristic, automated world.

In “Gear,” though, projection-mapping animates the space and enables fast-paced scene changes, and is also used to turn audience members into mapping surfaces to conjure a remarkable holistic experience.

== Venue ==
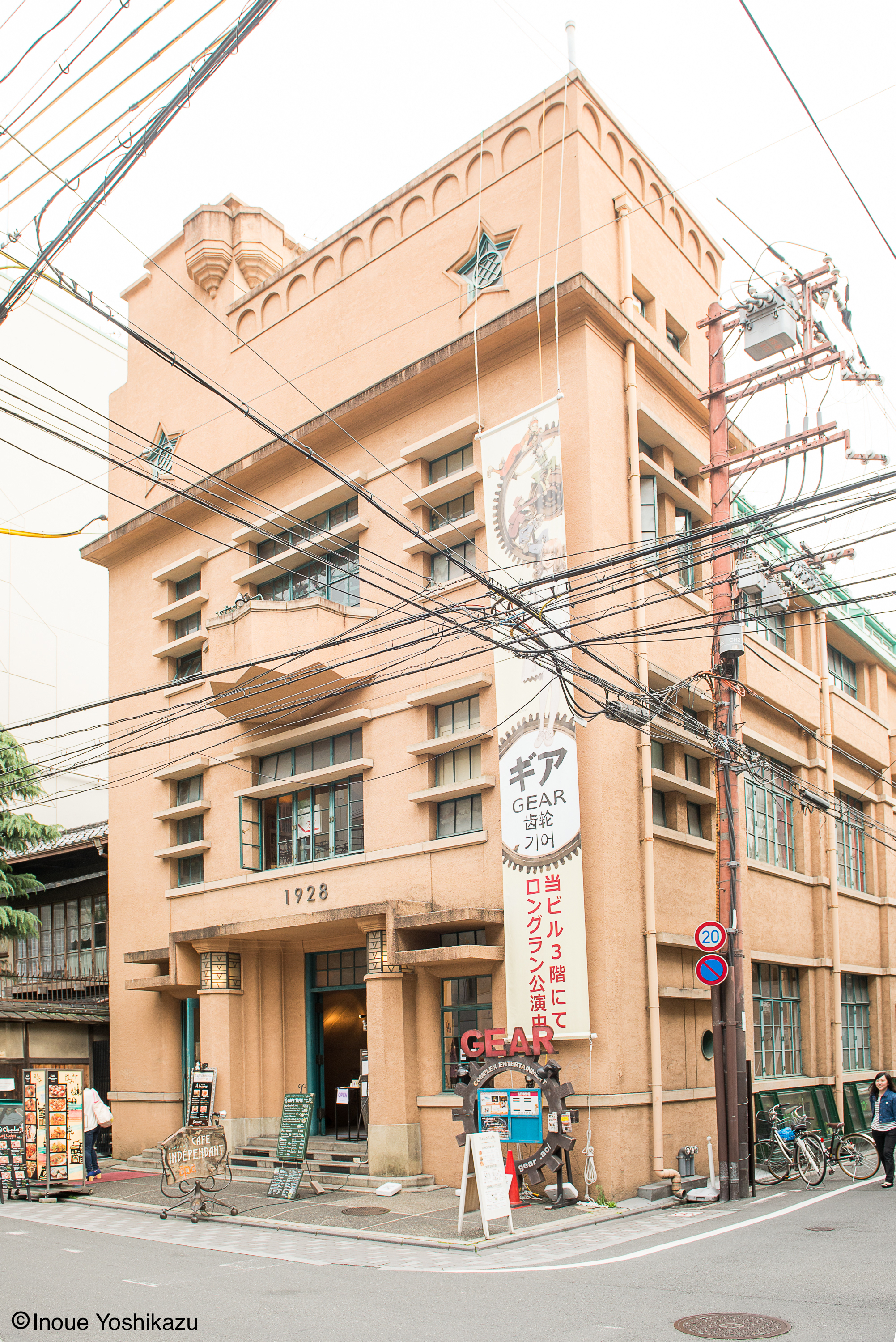
1928 Building, home of GEAR. Photo (c) and by Inoue Yoshikazu

The long-term theatre for GEAR is a building in downtown Kyoto called 1928. The building was built in 1928, and used to house the Kyoto branch of the Osaka Mainichi Newspaper. The building has many Art Deco embellishments and is a good example of Taisho Era Japanese architecture. It is designated a Kyoto City Tangible Cultural Property.

== See also ==
- Kyoto Butoh-kan
- Nanta
- STOMP
- Blue Man Group
- Akihiro Yamada
