= Ani-Imo =

Japanese manga series

- First volume cover of the English release

兄が妹で妹が兄で。 (Ani ga Imōto de Imōto ga Ani de)
- Genre: Romantic comedy
- Manga
- Written by: Haruko Kurumatani
- Published by: Kodansha
- English publisher: NA: Yen Press
- Magazine: Aria
- Original run: July 7, 2012 – August 12, 2014
- Volumes: 7

Ani-Imo (Japanese: 兄が妹で妹が兄で。, Hepburn: Ani ga Imōto de Imōto ga Ani de; 'Big Brother is Little Sister, Little Sister is Big Brother') is a Japanese manga series written and illustrated by Haruko Kurumatani. Ani-Imo centers around Youta and his twin sister Hikaru. They are unrelated by blood and switch bodies with each other through an accident. Youta finds that the little sister which he thought he knew turns out to be very different. Hikaru, now in Youta's body, announces she has always had feelings towards her brother as more than a brother and intends to make him hers.

The series was first serialized in Aria magazine. Seven manga volumes were released in Japan; Yen Press licensed the series for release in North America and has also published all of the volumes. The first volume of the series released in North America was met with overall positive reviews. Critics point out that the incest theme may be a possible turnoff, but that the storyline has an interesting premise.

== Plot ==
Ani-Imo is about Youta and his twin sister Hikaru. Youta is very protective of her and has been since childhood. He always thought of his sister as innocent and quiet, until one day a freak accident causes the two to swap bodies. Hikaru, now in her brother's body shows her true self and states that she is and always has been deeply in love with him as more than a brother. At first, Youta is surprised, but as the story progresses, he realizes he feels the same.

== Characters ==
Youta Koizumi (小泉Youta, Koizumi Youta)
Youta is one of the main characters in the series. He has a twin sister named Hikaru who he has protected since childhood as she has always appeared shy. Youta is shocked to discover from his parents one day that he and Hikaru are not related by blood. Hikaru knew though, and tells Youta that she was overjoyed when she found out. After the two switch bodies, Youta is shocked to discover that Hikaru has no intention of giving her brother's body back to him. Youta initially had a crush on Yurika but that fades when he finds out through being in Hikaru's body that she is in love with her and only likes females. Not knowing what to do or how to switch back, Youta asks Dr. Chisato for help and uses him for advice. Youta is initially surprised at how Hikaru feels about him, but slowly finds out that he loves Hikaru as more than just a sister. The two eventually start a consented relationship, and grow closer to each other.
Hikaru Koizumi (小泉光るなら, Koizumi Hikaru)
Hikaru is the other main character of the series. Hikaru at first appears shy, but very happy around her brother, Youta, who has been protecting her since childhood. Hikaru kisses Youta when he finds out their lack of blood relation and then runs off resulting in an accident that switches her into her brother's body. Hikaru announces she has no intentions of going back to her old body and pushes her romantic feelings towards Youta. Hikaru is very serious when it comes to her feelings towards her brother and states at one point that the "brother/sister relationship is now over". She has been jealous in the past whenever Yurika got close to her brother and shows no interest in Yurika's one-sided romantic feelings towards her. Hikaru is also wary and angered by Dr. Chisato's intentions towards her brother. She continues to pursue her brother even after at one point the two switch back, resulting in Youta feeling the same way towards her.
Yurika Oda (ゆりか小田, Oda Yurika)
Yurika is Youta and Hikaru's classmate. Youta initially has a crush on her but that falls flat upon discovering her true personality and that she is in love with Hikaru. Yurika schemes to split Youta and Hikaru apart so she can have Hikaru all to herself. In the third volume, another accident causes Yurika and Kakeru to switch bodies as well. She discovers that she is not the only one in another person's body, and reaffirms her feelings to Hikaru (now in Youta's body). Yurika slowly begins to realize her love is one sided though, and begins to show an interest towards Kakeru who is now in her body.
Kakeru Mayama (真山翔, Mayama Kakeru)
Kakeru is another one of Youta and Hikaru's classmates. He initially has a crush on Hikaru, not knowing that Youta is in her body. After he switches bodies with Yurika the romance falls flat as he discovers who had been in Hikaru's body. Kakeru and Youta form a friendship as they are both working towards the same common goal of returning to their bodies. The switch is a lot for Kakeru to take in, and he initially thinks that it is all a dream. He is told that it is not and gets drilled by Yurika on how to treat her body. He eventually falls in love with Yurika even though he is in her body, and decides that he is okay with not switching back. He is also seen offering advice to Youta in his time of need when dealing with the body swapping. In the final volume Kakeru is shown to have given birth to five children while in Yurika's body.
Chisato Ichijou (一条千里, Ichijou Chisato)
Chisato is Youta and Hikaru's doctor. After the accident that had them switch bodies Chisato was assigned as their doctor. He is surprised and intrigued when he finds out that his two patients have switched bodies. Chisato appears as a sadist, delighting in the fact that the two are in different bodies and do not know what to do. At one point Hikaru, who has been suspicious of him, asks what his true intentions are, Chisato responds by saying that they would make interesting test subjects.

== Release ==
Ani ga Imōto de Imōto ga Ani de was originally serialized in Aria magazine from July 7, 2012, to August 12, 2014. Seven manga books in all were released in Japan through Kodansha. On October 12, 2013, Yen Press announced at their New York Comic Con panel that they had licensed the series under the name Ani-Imo. At the beginning of each volume, a translation is provided that reads "[Ani-Imo] Big Brother becomes Little Sister; Little Sister becomes Big Brother". All seven English language volumes were released by Yen Press between November 18, 2014, and June 28, 2016.

Volume	Japanese		English	
Volume	ISBN	Release date	ISBN	Release date
1	ISBN 978-4-06-380588-8	August 7, 2012	ISBN 978-0-316-37861-1	November 18, 2014
2	ISBN 978-4-06-380610-6	January 7, 2013	ISBN 978-0-316-38045-4	February 24, 2015
3	ISBN 978-4-06-380623-6	April 5, 2013	ISBN 978-0-316-38046-1	May 19, 2015
4	ISBN 978-4-06-380646-5	September 6, 2013	ISBN 978-0-316-30504-4	August 18, 2015
5	ISBN 978-4-06-380673-1	February 7, 2014	ISBN 978-0-316-34574-3	November 17, 2015
6	ISBN 978-4-06-380698-4	June 6, 2014	ISBN 978-0-316-34575-0	February 23, 2016
7	ISBN 978-4-06-380722-6	January 7, 2015	ISBN 978-0-316-27238-4	June 28, 2016

== Reception ==
The English-language adaptation of Ani-Imo has received mostly positive reviews. Rebecca Silverman of Anime News Network gave the first volume a B rating. She praised it for its use of body language and how most of the humor works, although says that the humor can feel too mean at times and that the incest theme will be "offputting" to some readers. Matthew Warner from The Fandom Post also gave the first volume of the series a B, criticizing the artwork as "bland" and "mostly chibi". He also says that the hurdles of incest and homosexuality might turn people off, but that the story has "interesting parts to its setup". When talking about the characters, he goes on to say that Youta's character makes for some "fun and unique laughs", while "Hikaru also has a fun personality". Ash Brown from Experiments in Manga (Manga Bookshelf) called the first volume a "bit off-putting". He calls the doctor's character "extremely predatory" and disliked the youthful appearance of the high schoolers. Shaenon K. Garrity from Otaku USA also reviewed the first volume. She says that the artwork for Youta portrays a "tall bespectacled bishonen, while Hikaru is a big-eyed, purple-haired moe pixie". She goes on to say that Ani-Imo is "entertaining if only for how outrageous it's willing to get".
