= Demon from Afar =

Japanese manga series

- First tankōbon volume cover

異域之鬼 (Iiki no Ki)
- Genre: Dark fantasy
- Manga
- Written by: Kaori Yuki
- Published by: Kodansha
- English publisher: NA: Yen Press
- Magazine: Aria
- Original run: 28 July 2010 – 28 March 2013
- Volumes: 6

Demon from Afar (Japanese: 異域之鬼, Hepburn: Iiki no ki) is a Japanese dark fantasy manga series written and illustrated by Kaori Yuki. It was serialized in Kodansha's monthly shōjo (targeted towards girls) manga magazine Aria from the July 2010 to March 2013, with its chapters collected in six tankōbon volumes. In North America, Yen Press licensed the series for an English-language translation, and published it from December 2014 to March 2016.

== Release ==
Written and illustrated by Kaori Yuki, Demon from Afar was serialized in Kodansha's monthly shōjo manga magazine Aria from 28 July 2010 to 28 March 2013. Kodansha collected its chapters in six tankōbon volumes, released from 7 March 2011 to 7 May 2013.

In North America, Yen Press licensed the series for an English-language translation, and published it from 16 December 2014, to 22 March 2016. The series has also been translated into other languages, including French and German.

=== Volumes ===
No.	Original release date	Original ISBN	English release date	English ISBN
1	7 March 2011	978-4-06-380502-4	16 December 2014	978-0-316-33667-3
2	7 July 2011	978-4-06-380520-8	24 March 2015	978-0-316-38308-0
3	7 December 2011	978-4-06-380550-5	23 June 2015	978-0-316-34219-3
4	7 June 2012	978-4-06-380572-7	22 September 2015	978-0-316-34576-7
5	7 December 2012	978-4-06-380603-8	15 December 2015	978-0-316-34579-8
6	7 May 2013	978-4-06-380627-4	22 March 2016	978-0-316-34580-4

== Reception ==
In December 2014, the first volume of the English-language translation ranked 273rd on ICv2's list of the 300 bestselling graphic novels, selling an estimated 372 copies.

A French reviewer for Manga News wrote that while the first volume was good in general and had a nice premise, it was confusing to follow along, similar to the first volume of Grand Guignol Orchestra. The reviewer also expressed disappointment with the volume, as the reviewer felt that it was not up to par for the author. A reviewer for Manga Sanctuary, in contrast, praised the volume, finding it to be an enjoyable introduction to the series. The reviewer, however, did not think that it would appeal to every reader. A German reviewer for Splashcomics had mixed feelings about the first volume and wrote that while the story works as a mystery with Yuki's style, it covers narrative ground already seen before in her earlier works.
