= The Demon Prince of Momochi House =

Japanese manga series

- The cover of the first manga volume

百千さん家のあやかし王子 (Momochi-san Chi no Ayakashi Ouji)
- Genre: Fantasy, romance
- Manga
- Written by: Aya Shouoto
- Published by: Kadokawa Shoten
- English publisher: NA: Viz Media
- Magazine: Asuka
- Original run: February 23, 2013 – August 24, 2019
- Volumes: 16
- Manga

The Demon Prince of Momochi House: Succession
- Written by: Aya Shouoto
- Published by: Kadokawa Shoten
- English publisher: NA: Viz Media
- Magazine: Asuka
- Original run: July 24, 2023 – September 24, 2025
- Volumes: 3
- Anime television series
- Directed by: Bob Shirahata
- Written by: Yasuko Aoki
- Music by: Ayana Tsujita; Tomoyuki Kono
- Studio: Drive
- Licensed by: Crunchyroll; SEA: Plus Media Networks Asia
- Original network: Tokyo MX, GYT, GTV, BS11, AT-X
- Original run: January 6, 2024 – March 23, 2024
- Episodes: 12
- icon

The Demon Prince of Momochi House (Japanese: 百千さん家のあやかし王子, Hepburn: Momochi-san Chi no Ayakashi Ouji) is a Japanese manga series written and illustrated by Aya Shouoto. It was serialized in Kadokawa Shoten's shōjo manga magazine Monthly Asuka from February 2013 to August 2019. An anime television series adaptation produced by Drive aired from January to March 2024.

== Plot ==
On her 16th birthday, the orphan Momochi Himari, unexpectedly receives the old Momochi family estate as inheritance. Despite the warnings she received about the house being haunted, having no other place to go, she decides to move there anyway. Upon her arrival she discovers that the house is occupied illegally by three handsome young men: Aoi, Yukari and Ise. The three immediately warn the unaware Himari that she must leave the house as soon as possible, using the story of the ghosts and curses as well, but she does not give up. Soon, she discovers that it is all true: her home appears to be on the border between the human and the spirit worlds, and she was destined to be the guardian between the two, but her role is already taken by Aoi.

== Characters ==
Himari Momochi (百千 ひまり, Momochi Himari)
Voiced by: Saki Fujita (drama CD), Natsumi Kawaida (anime) (Japanese); Bryn Apprill (English)
It has been stated in the manga that Himari's parents passed away, most likely when she was very young and has been an orphan ever since. It is unclear if she has any siblings before the incident or how her parents passed on. By having the blood of the Momochi family running in her veins, she is supposed to be the next Omamori-sama or, 'Nue', the guardian of the Momochi House when she receives the will of her family when she turns 16. This would make her the guardian of the Momochi House which is located on the border of the human and spirit world, which would fall under the guardian's protection and monitoring, however, that role has been taken by Aoi and now, she only holds the power to expel anyone from the house if she wishes hard enough due to her bloodline.
Aoi Nanamori (七守 葵, Nanamori Aoi)
Voiced by: KENN (drama CD), Takeo Ōtsuka (anime), Natsumi Fujiwara (young) (Japanese); Cody Savoie (English)
He is human, but he became the Omamori-sama at the age of 10 while trying to run away from something, he broke the seal and entered in the Momochi house, this forced him to become its guardian. The house has erased all the traces of his existence in the human world, which is why it seems that neither his family nor friends remember him. In the Nue form, he is a spirit with cat ears, bird feathers and foxtail.
Yukari (紫)
Voiced by: Shinnosuke Tachibana (anime) (Japanese); Aaron Dismuke (English)
He is Aoi's first shikigami, a serving spirit, in his demonic form he has the appearance of a Mizuchi, a water snake. In his past life he was human, wrongly accused of being a demon, given as a sacrifice to the dragon god Ryujin, the god took pity on him and allowed him to be reborn as an Ayakashi of his own species. He is very kind and does all the houseworks.
Ise (伊勢)
Voiced by: Yūki Ono (drama CD, anime) (Japanese); Van Barr Jr. (English)
He is Aoi's second shikigami, in his demonic form he has the appearance of a Shōjō, an orangutan. He is the youngest of his species, for breaking the law by releasing his powers to the human world, the elders of his tribe fitted him with a cursed collar and warned him if he broke the law again, the curse would destroy his body. In order to save a friend, he ended up breaking the law so Aoi made Ise his shikigami to dissolve the curse and save him. Before arriving at the Momochi house, he enjoyed observing humans and sometimes playing pranks on them. Unlike Yukari, he is very grumpy.
Onmoraki (おんもらき, On moraki)
Voiced by: Natsuki Hanae (drama CD), Ari Ozawa (anime)
He is one of the Lesser Yokais. He is a bird Ayakashi. He becomes third shikigami of Aoi as given "Zushi".
Hakka (八渦)
He is a gatekeeper in the spirit realm, he aspired to become the new Omamori-sama, but the Nue, to keep him at bay, forced him to become one of his shikigami. He too, in his past life, was human.
Kasha (火車)
Voiced by: Taku Yashiro (anime)
He is a powerful Ayakashi with super strength powers and sharp claws. He has a deep obsession towards the Nue, and is his biggest rival. To fight boredom, he enjoys annoying the members of the Momochi household, and his arrival usually announces big troubles.
Hayato Hidaka (日高 隼, Hidaka Hayato)
Voiced by: Seiichiro Yamashita (Japanese); Conner Allison (English)
A childhood friend of Aoi who still has some fragments of his memories with him. He is the descendant of a family that had the power to control the Kuda-gitsune, a fox-like spirit, although he demonstrated that he did not inherit this ability, he still has some connection with the spirit world.
Takamura Nachi (那智 篁, Nachi Takamura)
Voiced by: Wataru Hatano (anime)
Tamamo (玉萌)
Voiced by: Misaki Kuno
A kitsune who have the appearance of child.

== Media ==
=== Manga ===
Written and illustrated by Aya Shouoto, The Demon Prince of Momochi House was serialized in Kadokawa Shoten's Asuka manga magazine from February 23, 2013, to August 24, 2019. The manga has been licensed in North America by Viz Media in 2014. It is also published in France by Soleil, in Poland by Waneko, and in Taiwan by Kadokawa Taiwan Corporation.

A sequel manga was serialized in the same magazine from July 24, 2023, to September 24, 2025. The sequel is also licensed in North America by Viz Media.

==== Volumes ====
No.	Original release date	Original ISBN	North America release date	North America ISBN
1	July 23, 2013	978-40-4120-810-6	July 7, 2015	978-1-4215-7962-7
01. "The Mysterious Residents of Momochi House" (百千さん家のあやしい人々, Momochi-san Chi no Ayashii Hitobito); 02. "Himari Becomes a Landlady" (ひまり、家主になる。, Himari, Yanushi ni Naru.); 03. "Falling Cherry Blossoms Stir Up a Storm of Love?!" (桜吹雪は恋の嵐！？, Sakurafubuki wa Koi no Arashi!?)
2	November 26, 2013	978-40-4120-893-9	October 6, 2015	978-1-4215-7963-4
04. "Mystery House" (マヨイガ, Mayoiga); 05. "A Formidable New Shikigami?!" (アイツはてごわい新式神！？, Aitsu wa Tegowai Shin-shikigami!?); 06. "Underwater Momochi House" (水の底の百千家, Mizu no Soko no Momochi Chi); 07. "The Fourth Friend: Part 1" (四人目の友達-前-, Yonin-me no Tomodachi: Zen); Bonus Story. "You May Enter" (通りやんせ, Tōri-yan se)
3	February 26, 2014	978-40-4121-026-0	January 5, 2016	978-1-4215-7964-1
08. "The Fourth Friend: Part 2" (四人目の友達-後-, Yonin-me no Tomodachi: Kō); 09. "The Crimson Flames Burning in Darkness" (闇に燃えし紅の, Yami no Moeshi Aka no); 10. "Dream or Illusion?! A Banquet at Momochi House" (夢か幻!?百千家の祝宴, Yume ka Maborosh!? Momochi Chi no Shukuen); 11. "The Nue of Chinui Cavern" (千縫洞の鵺, Chinui Hora no Nue)
4	June 26, 2014	978-40-4101-673-2	April 5, 2016	978-1-4215-8048-7
12. "Four-Leaf Clover and a Pinkie Promise" (四つ葉とげんまん, Yotsuba to Genman); 13. "Sunset Fox: Part 1" (夕焼け稲荷-前-, Yūyake Inari: Zen); 14. "Sunset Fox: Part 2" (夕焼け稲荷-後-, Yūyake Inari: Kō); 15. "A Treasure Trove of Surprises?!" (あけて吃驚玉手箱！？, Akete Bikkuri Tamatebako!?)
5	October 25, 2014	978-40-4102-218-4	July 5, 2016	978-1-4215-8630-4
16. "Ephemeral Waters of Past and Present: Part 1" (泡沫今昔-前-, Utakata Konjaku: Zen); 17. "Ephemeral Waters of Past and Present: Part 2" (泡沫今昔-後-, Utakata Konjaku: Kō); 18. "Enjoying the Cool Evening Breeze?! A Scare Dare" (納涼！？肝だめしにはご注意を, Nōryō!? Kimodameshi ni wa Gochūi o); 19. "Jealousy and Love" (ヤキモチと恋心, Yakimochi to Koigokoro)
6	February 26, 2015	978-40-4102-563-5	October 4, 2016	978-1-4215-8631-1
20. "A Young Girl's Heart Is Lost, Then Found" (オトメゴコロは散る散る未散る, Otomegokoro wa Chiru Chiru Mi-chiru); 21. "An Unwelcome Guest" (うろんな客, Urunna Kyaku); 22. "Domestic Training Is Impossible" (花嫁修業はにゃん攻不落！, Hanayomeshūgyō wa Nyan-se Furaku!); 23. "Some Like It Hot in the Dark?" (暗闇はお熱いのがお好き？, Kurayami wa O-atsui no ga O-suki?); Bonus Story. "Child's Play" (花いちもんめ, Hana Ichi Monme)
7	June 26, 2015	978-40-4103-119-3	January 3, 2017	978-1-4215-8632-8
24. "Kagome Kagome" (かごめかごめ, Kagome Kagome); 25. "The Bird in the Cage" (かごの中の鳥はいつ, Kago no Naka no Tori wa Itsu); 26. "Who Is That Behind You?" (後ろの正面だぁれ, Ushiro no Shōmen Dāre); 27. "When Night Dawns" (夜明けの晩に, Yoake no Ban ni)
8	October 21, 2015	978-40-4103-659-4	April 4, 2017	978-1-4215-8909-1
28. "An Unfamiliar Way Home" (見知らぬ家路, Mishiranu Ieji); 29. "Himari in Ayakashi Land" (妖の国のひまり, Ayakashi no Kuni no Himari); 30. "The Tale of Aoi's Past" (葵の昔ばなし, Aoi no Mukashibanashi); 31. "A Faceless Visitor" (顔無きおとない, Kao-naki Otonai); Bonus Story. "Momochi House's Next Slam!" (百千さん家のNEXTドン！, Momochi-san Chi no Nekusuto Don!); Bonus Story. "Momochi Private Academy" (私立 百千さん学園, Shiritsu Momochi-san Gakuen)
9	June 25, 2016	978-40-4104-415-5	July 4, 2017	978-1-4215-9346-3
32. "Wish" (願いごと, Negaigoto); 33. "The Seventh Child" (七つの子, Nanatsu no Ko); 34. "Welcome Back to Momochi House!" (おかえり！ 百千家へ, Okaeri! Momochi Chi e); 35. "Light" (灯, Hi)
10	November 26, 2016	978-40-4105-103-0	October 3, 2017	978-1-4215-9578-8
36. "Love Under a Single Roof" (ひとつ屋根の下、恋模様, Hitotsu Yane no Shita, Koi Moyō); 37. "Color Tag" (色鬼ごっこ, Iro Onigokko); 38. "There Are Limits to Being a Freeloader!" (居候にもホドがある！？, Isōrō ni mo Hodo ga Aru!?); Bonus Chapter. "To Capture an Orangutan: A Comedic Tale" (狂言釣猩々, Kyōgen Tsuri Shōjō)
11	March 25, 2017	978-40-4105-528-1	March 6, 2018	978-1-4215-9766-9
39. "The Festival of Darkness" (黒闇まつり, Kokuan Matsuri); 40. "No Other" (不倶戴天, Fugutaiten); 41. "Masked Confession" (仮面の告白, Kamen no Kokuhaku); 42. "The Chimera of Original Sin" (原罪のキメラ, Genzai no Kimera)
12	August 24, 2017	978-40-4106-012-4	July 3, 2018	978-1-9747-0098-1
43. "The Pain of Parting with Loves Ones: Welcoming Fire" (愛別離苦-送り火-, Aibetsuriku: Okuribi); 44. "Midsummer Miniature Garden" (真夏の箱庭, Manatsu no Hakoniwa); 45. "Crashing Summer" (墜落する夏, Suirakusuru Natsu); 46. "Join Together, Open Wide" (結んでひらいて, Musunde Hiraite)
13	March 24, 2018	978-40-4106-730-7	January 1, 2019	978-1-9747-0402-6
47. "Summer Learning Experience ⭑ Himari Becomes A Ghost" (夏の体験学習★ひまり幽霊になる, Natuso no Taikengakushū Himari Yūrei ni Naru); 48. "The Place Where I Belong" (私の居場所, Watashi no Ibasho); 49. "A Teacher on a Night Stroll" (夜歩き先生, Yoaruki Sensei); 50. "A Teapot in the Sleeping Woods" (眠りの森のちゃちゃつぼちゃつぼ, Nemuri no Mori no Cha Chatsubo Chatsubo); 51. "Kasha Is a Love Rival?! Himari's Big ⭒ Proposal ⭒ Plan" (恋仇は火車!?ひまりのプロポーズ大☆作☆戦!!, Koigataki wa Kasha!? Himari no Puropōzu Taisaku)
14	October 24, 2018	978-40-4107-519-7	September 3, 2019	978-1-9747-0884-0
52. "Fourteen Lullabies" (十四の子守唄, Jūshi no Komoriuta); 53. "A Night of Ayakashi Is Mystifying" (あやかしの夜はあやなし, Ayakashi no Yoru wa Ayanashi); 54. "Defy the Social Order! The Shikigami Revolt" (下剋上等！式神の乱, Gekokujō-nado! Shikigami no Ran); 55. "The Bored Ayakashi" (あやかし退屈男, Ayakashi Taikutsu Otoko); 56. "Who's That Behind You?" (うしろの正面だぁれ, Ushiro no Shōmen Dāre)
15	April 24, 2019	978-40-4108-061-0	March 3, 2020	978-1-9747-1201-4
57. "An Endless Game" (無限遊戯, Mugen Yūgi); 58. "0831"; 59. "After Summer's End" (夏も終わりて, Natsu mo Owarite); 60. "Momochi House" (百千家, Momochi Chi)
16	October 24, 2019	978-40-4108-794-7	October 6, 2020	978-1-9747-1734-7
61. Spirited Away (神かくし, Kami Kakushi); 62. Aoi and Himari (葵とひまり, Aoi to Himari); 63. Some Time Ago (ひととせ, Hito to se); 64. Welcome Home (おかえり, Okaeri)

==== The Demon Prince of Momochi House: Succession ====
No.	Original release date	Original ISBN	North America release date	North America ISBN
1	February 24, 2024	978-40-4114-603-3	July 1, 2025	978-1-9747-5586-8
2	January 24, 2025	978-40-4115-804-3	January 6, 2026	978-1-9747-6123-4
3	October 24, 2025	978-40-4116-595-9	October 6, 2026	978-1-9747-6663-5

=== Stage play ===
A stage play adaptation ran in the Hakuhinkan Theater in Ginza from June 10 to June 14, 2015. It was directed by Satoru Takii, with Hinako Aoi writing the screenplay, and Tatsuya Kawachi in charge of choreography. It starred Haruka Shiraishi as Himari, Syuusuke Saito as Aoi, Ryosuke Haba as Yukari, Kōhei Murakami as Ise, Keisuke Aku as Onmoraki, and Kago Kasuya as Kasha.

=== Anime ===
During Crunchyroll's Japan Expo 2023 panel, an anime television series adaptation was announced. It is produced by Drive and directed by Bob Shirahata, with character designs provided by Mariko Oka, series composition by Yasuko Aoki, and music composed by Ayana Tsujita and Tomoyuki Kono. The series aired from January 6 to March 23, 2024, on Tokyo MX and other networks. (Note: Tokyo MX lists the series premiere on January 5 at 24:00, which is effectively January 6 at midnight JST.) The opening theme song is "Hōzuki" (鬼灯) by Yoh Kamiyama, while the ending theme song is "Aiyue" (愛故) by Muto. Crunchyroll licensed the series. Plus Media Networks Asia licensed the series in Southeast Asia.

==== Episodes ====
No.	Title (Note: All English titles are taken from Crunchyroll.)	Directed by	Storyboarded by	Original release date
1	"Strangers of Momochi House"; Transliteration: "Momochi-san Chi no Ayashii Hitobito" (Japanese: 百千さん家のあやしい人々)	Masahiko Watanabe	Bob Shirahata	January 6, 2024
On her 16th birthday, Himari Momochi the orphan receives a will from her deceased parents and inherits Momochi House.
2	"Mayoiga"; Transliteration: "Mayoiga" (Japanese: マヨイガ)	Shunji Yoshida	Bob Shirahata	January 13, 2024
Himari is determined to settle into life at Momochi House, which won't be as easy as it sounds. The residents are still resistant to her, and her very presence seems to be taking a toll on Aoi...
3	"A Fourth Friend"; Transliteration: "Yonin-me no Tomodachi" (Japanese: 四人目の友達)	Oyunamu	Hiroyuki Fukushima	January 20, 2024
Himari brings a group of her new classmates home with her only to discover that something is very, very wrong with one of them.
4	"Crimson Burns the Dark"; Transliteration: "Yami ni Moeshi Aka no" (Japanese: 闇に燃えし紅の)	Nobukage Kimura	Nobukage Kimura	January 27, 2024
Kasha's visit has left Momochi House reeling in a way that will test Aoi, his power, and all of his friends. Can Ise in particular rise to the challenge?
5	"Inari Sunset"; Transliteration: "Yūyake Inari" (Japanese: 夕焼け稲荷)	Yoshihisa Matsumoto	Yoshihisa Matsumoto	February 3, 2024
Himari meets a new classmate who everyone says is cursed. Surely that can't be true, right? So what's that dark mist shrouding him?
6	"Fleeting Times"; Transliteration: "Utakata Konjaku" (Japanese: 泡沫今昔)	Shigenori Awai	Hidetoshi Omori	February 10, 2024
Sacred springs in the spirit realm are being spoiled by dark, poisonous water. What is its source? Where is the dragon god who is said to protect these springs? And what is their connection to Yukari?
7	"The Looking Glass at Twilight"; Transliteration: "Tasokare no, Nozoki Kagami" (Japanese: 誰そ彼の、のぞき鏡)	Masahiko Watanabe	Bob Shirahata	February 17, 2024
Himari discovers that Nachi has a mirror said to reveal what its beholder wishes to see most. What will Himari see when she looks into it?
8	"A Cat and Wandering Child"; Transliteration: "Neko to Mayoigo" (Japanese: 猫と迷い子)	Shunji Yoshida	Susumu Nishizawa	February 24, 2024
Aoi seems to be in a slump. His seals aren't working well, meaning lesser yokai are now running amok at Momochi House. Good thing Granny Cat arrives to clean up... except it looks like she means to take Himari out with the trash!
9	"A Raven-Black Storm"; Transliteration: "Nurebairo no Arashi" (Japanese: 濡れ羽色の嵐)	Yoshihisa Matsumoto	Yoshihisa Matsumoto	March 2, 2024
Himari and her friends go to investigate the unsettling rumors about Kagome Park, but the horror strikes too close to home when an uninvited guest comes knocking at Momochi House.
10	"Shelf of Hearts"; Transliteration: "Omohoyu no Tana" (Japanese: 思ほゆの棚)	Matsuo Asami	Shoen Park	March 9, 2024
Aoi, Yukari, and Ise disappear in the raven-black storm that has fallen over Momochi House. Determined to find them, Himari scours the house and beyond for any clue of their whereabouts... and she may learn more than she's prepared for.
11	"The Blue Hollyhock Dawns"; Transliteration: "Aoi Reimei" (Japanese: あおい黎明)	Manganji Senka	Nobukage Kimura	March 16, 2024
Himari dives into Aoi's past to learn more about him and hopefully discover a way to save him. Can her connection to Aoi break him of the crow's curse?
12	"The Light That Crosses Seas"; Transliteration: "Banri ni Wataru Tomoshibi" (Japanese: 万里に渡る灯火)	Masahiko Watanabe	Susumu Nishizawa	March 23, 2024
Now that Aoi and the others are safely back in the house that sits between the human world and spiritual realm, Aoi has something to share with Himari about her rightful place there.

== Reception ==
Rebecca Silverman from Anime News Network said that the artwork is similar to that of Kamisama Kiss and Natsume's Book of Friends, but admitted that Aya's art has become more refined compared to before. She pointed out that the manga is easy to read and the story development is interesting because it leaves some questions in readers' minds. In a review of the first volume, Kate O'Neil of Fandom Post wrote that she didn't see anything new in the manga, but praised the author for its colour artwork. She also said that it looks to her like a blend of many shōjo manga. The 6th volume ranked 6th in The New York Times manga best seller list in October 2016.

== See also ==
- Kiss of the Rose Princess, another manga series by the same author
- He's My Only Vampire, another manga series by the same author
