= Fuyumi Ono =

Japanese novelist (born 1960)

- 小野 不由美
- Born: December 24, 1960 (age 65); Nakatsu, Ōita, Japan
- Occupation: Writer
- Spouse: Yukito Ayatsuji
- Writing career
- Language: Japanese
- Genres: Fantasy, horror
- Notable works: The Twelve Kingdoms, Ghost Hunt, Shiki

Fuyumi Ono (小野 不由美, Ono Fuyumi; born December 24, 1960) is a Japanese novelist best known for writing The Twelve Kingdoms (十二国記, Jūni Kokuki), which was adapted into a popular anime series. She is married to Yukito Ayatsuji, the author of the horror novel Another.

== Biography ==
Ono is married to Naoyuki Uchida (内田 直行, Uchida Naoyuki), a mystery novelist who writes under the pseudonym Yukito Ayatsuji (綾辻 行人, Ayatsuji Yukito).

Her name after marriage to Ayatsuji Yukito is Uchida Fuyumi, but she writes under her maiden name, which is Ono Fuyumi.

Before she started work on The Twelve Kingdoms, Fuyumi Ono wrote The Demonic Child (魔性の子, Mashō no Ko), a horror novel about a boy from another world. She later worked certain events from this novel into the Twelve Kingdoms series. Short stories set in the various kingdoms include: Kasho (華胥), Toei (冬栄), Shokan (書簡), Kizan (帰山) and Jogetsu (乗月). In February, 2008, a new Twelve Kingdoms short story, "Hisho no Tori" (丕緒の鳥) was published in Shinchosha's Yomyom magazine.

On March 18, 2007, according to an interview at the Anime News Network, she is "currently rewriting a girls' horror series (she) wrote long ago".

== Major works ==
- Akuryo Series (1989–92, 8 light novel volumes, Kodansha)
  - Ghost Hunt (also known as Nightmare Dwelling) (1994, 2 light novel volumes, Kodansha) – continuation of Akuryo Series but in a different setting
- The Twelve Kingdoms (1992-present, 9 novels and 2 short story collections, Kodansha, later Shinchosha)
- Shiki (1998, novel in 2 volumes)

== Works ==
=== Evil Spirit Series ===
- Evil Spirit series (悪霊シリーズ – Akuryō series), Kodansha.
- There are lots of Evil Spirits?! (悪霊がいっぱい!?) 1989. ISBN 978-4-06-190311-1
- There are really lots of Evil Spirits! (悪霊がホントにいっぱい!), 1989. ISBN 978-4-06-190365-4
- Too many Evil Spirits to sleep (悪霊がいっぱいで眠れない), 1990. ISBN 978-4-06-190417-0
- A lonely Evil Spirit (悪霊はひとりぼっち) 1990. ISBN 978-4-06-190485-9
- I Don't Want to Become an Evil Spirit! (悪霊になりたくない!), 1991. ISBN 978-4-06-190594-8
- Don't Call me an Evil Spirit (悪霊とよばないで), 1991. ISBN 978-4-06-198575-9
- I don't mind Evil Spirits 1 (悪霊だってヘイキ!〈上〉), 1992. ISBN 978-4-06-198696-1
- I don't mind Evil Spirits 2 (悪霊だってヘイキ!〈下〉), 1992. ISBN 978-4-06-198697-8

=== Ghost Hunt Series ===
- Ghost Hunt Series (ゴースト・ハントシリーズ) A continuation of the Evil Spirit series, but in a different setting
- Nightmare Dwelling 1 (悪夢の棲む家(上)), 1994, Kodansha. ISBN 978-4-06-255156-4
- Nightmare Dwelling 2 (悪夢の棲む家(下)), 1994, Kodansha. ISBN 978-4-06-255164-9

=== The Twelve Kingdoms ===
- The Twelve Kingdoms series (十二国記), Kodansha, unless otherwise noted
  - Shadow of the Moon, Sea of the Shadow (月の影 影の海), 1992. ISBN 4-06-255071-7 US Publication: 3/2007, Tokyopop ISBN 1-59816-946-7 as The Twelve Kingdoms: Sea of Shadow
  - Sea of the Wind, Shore of the Labyrinth (風の海 迷宮の岸), 1993. ISBN 4-06-255114-4 US Publication: 3/2008, Tokyopop ISBN 978-1-59816-947-8 as The Twelve Kingdoms: Sea of Wind
  - Sea God of the East, Vast Sea of the West (東の海神 西の滄海), 1994. ISBN 4-06-255168-3 US Publication: 3/2009, Tokyopop ISBN 978-1-59816-948-5 as The Twelve Kingdoms: The Vast Spread of the Seas
- A Thousand Miles of Wind, the Sky of Dawn (風の万里 黎明の空), 1994. ISBN 4-06-255175-6 US Publication: 3/2010, Tokyopop ISBN 978-1-59816-949-2 as The Twelve Kingdoms: Skies of Dawn
  - Aspired Wings (図南の翼), 1996. ISBN 4-06-255229-9
- "Drifting Ship" (漂舶), 1997 (short story)
- Shore at Dusk, Sky at Dawn (黄昏の岸 暁の天), 2001. ISBN 4-06-255546-8
  - Kashou's Dream (華胥の幽夢), 2001. ISBN 4-06-255573-5
- Prosperity in Winter (冬栄), originally published 4/2001 IN☆POCKET
- Kashou (華胥), originally published 5/2001 Mephisto
- Jougetsu (乗月)
- Correspondence (書簡)
- Kizan (帰山)
  - "The Birds of Hisho" (丕緒の鳥) 2/2008 (short story, published in Yomyom magazine)
- "Rakusho no Goku" (落照の獄) 9/2009 (short story, published in Yomyom magazine)
- The Birds of Hisho (丕緒の鳥), 2013, Shinchosha, ISBN 978-4-10-124058-9
- Silver Ruins, Black Moon (白銀の墟 玄の月), 2019, Shinchosha
- Demon's Child (魔性の子 Mashō no Ko), 1991, Kodansha. ISBN 4-10-124021-3. Loosely associated with The Twelve Kingdoms series

=== Other novels ===
- Can't Sleep on Birthday Eve (バースデー・イブは眠れない) 1988, Kodansha
- Mephisto and Waltz! (メフィストとワルツ!) 1988, Kodansha ISBN 978-4-06-190249-7, Continuation of Can't Sleep on Birthday Eve
- Evil Spirits Aren't Scary (悪霊なんかこわくない), 1989, Kodansha. ISBN 978-4-06-190257-2
- Charmed 17 year old (呪われた17歳) 1990 朝日ソノラマ
- 17 Springs Passed (過ぎる十七の春 Sugiru Jūshichi no Haru), 1995, Kodansha. ISBN 978-4-06-255201-1, an adaptation of Charmed 17 year old
- Green Home Spirits (グリーンホームの亡霊たち) 1990年朝日ソノラマ刊
- Home, Green Home (緑の我が家 Home、Green Home), 1997, Kodansha. ISBN 978-4062552943、an adaptation of Green Home Spirits
- Strange Tōkei Tales (東亰異聞 – Tōkei Ibun) (runner-up for the 1993 Japan Fantasy Novel Award), 1994, Shinchosha. ISBN 978-4-10-124022-0
- Shiki (屍鬼, literally Corpse Demon), 1998, Shinchosha. ISBN 978-4-10-397002-6
- Island of the Black Shrine (黒祠の島), 2001, Shodensha. ISBN 978-4-396-33164-1
- Kura no Kami (くらのかみ), 2003, Kodansha. ISBN 978-4-06-270564-6
- Zan'e (残穢), 2012, Shinchosha. ISBN 978-4-10-397004-0

=== Short story collection ===
- Ghost Stories Storybook (鬼談百景). Serialized since June 2000 in the magazine Yuu. published in 2012

=== Short story ===
- London, 1888 (倫敦、1888) 10/1993 Logout
