= List of manga published by Hakusensha =

This is a list of manga published by Hakusensha, listed by the year they were first released. For an alphabetical list, see Category:Hakusensha manga.

== 1970s ==
=== 1971 ===
- Shiroi Heya no Futari

=== 1975 ===
- Natsu e no Tobira

=== 1976 ===
- Glass Mask
- Sukeban Deka

=== 1978 ===
- Patalliro!
- The Star of Cottonland

=== 1979 ===
- Chizumi & Fujiomi

== 1980s ==
=== 1980 ===
- Hi Izuru Tokoro no Tenshi

=== 1981 ===
- Blue Sonnet

=== 1984 ===
- Cipher

=== 1985 ===
- Outlanders
- Sakura no Sono

=== 1986 ===
- Dominion

=== 1987 ===
- Hanasakeru Seishōnen
- Here Is Greenwood
- Please Save My Earth

=== 1989 ===
- Berserk
- Moon Child

== 1990s ==
=== 1991 ===
- Baby and Me
- Earl Cain

=== 1992 ===
- Eight Clouds Rising
- Japan
- Legend of Chun Hyang

=== 1993 ===
- From Far Away
- I Dream of Mimi
- Jyu-Oh-Sei
- Onmyōji
- Songs to Make You Smile

=== 1994 ===
- Angel Sanctuary
- Kaguyahime
- Phantom Dream

=== 1995 ===
- Challengers
- Tower of the Future
- Tsubasa: Those with Wings

=== 1996 ===
- Descendants of Darkness
- Hana-Kimi
- Kare Kano
- Okojo-san
- Tokyo Crazy Paradise

=== 1997 ===
- Air Master
- Futari Ecchi
- W Juliet

=== 1998 ===
- Ai Yori Aoshi
- Boy's Next Door
- Fruits Basket
- I Hate You More than Anyone
- Land of the Blindfolded
- Solfege

=== 1999 ===
- Ai-Ren
- Captive Hearts
- Harukanaru Toki no Naka de
- Ludwig Kakumei
- Mouse
- Never Give Up!
- Omukae desu
- Satisfaction Guaranteed
- Venus in Love

== 2000s ==
=== 2000 ===
- Portrait of M and N

=== 2001 ===
- Gatcha Gacha
- Global Garden
- Godchild
- Fun Fun Factory
- Hana Yori mo Hana no Gotoku
- Himitsu – Top Secret
- King of Cards
- Millennium Snow
- The Recipe for Gertrude
- Soul Rescue
- Tears of a Lamb

=== 2002 ===
- Futari Ecchi For Ladies
- Hotarubi no Mori e
- MeruPuri
- Ouran High School Host Club
- Pearl Pink
- Skip Beat!

=== 2003 ===
- All My Darling Daughters
- Beauty is the Beast
- Blood Hound
- Chocotto Sister
- Demon Sacred
- Gakuen Alice
- Nosatsu Junkie
- Nurse Witch Komugi
- Patalliro Saiyuki!
- S · A: Special A
- Yubisaki Milk Tea
- Yurara

=== 2004 ===
- Bloody Kiss
- Cute×Guy
- Full House Kiss
- The Magic Touch
- Me & My Brothers
- Meine Liebe
- Mugen Spiral
- Patalliro Genji Monogatari!
- This Ugly Yet Beautiful World
- Two Flowers for the Dragon
- V.B. Rose
- Vampire Knight
- Wild Ones
- Zig Zag

=== 2005 ===
- Ballad of a Shinigami
- Blank Slate
- Boku wo Tsutsumu Tsuki no Hikari
- Concerto
- Detroit Metal City
- Fairy Cube
- Happy Cafe
- Karakuri Odette
- Maid Sama!
- Mouse Bakumatsu-den
- Natsume's Book of Friends
- NG Life
- Ōoku: The Inner Chambers
- Otogimoyou Ayanishiki
- Penguin Revolution
- Sugar Princess
- Wanted

=== 2006 ===
- Akagami no Shirayukihime
- Cluster Edge
- Flower in a Storm
- Himawari-den!
- KimiKiss: Various heroines
- Otomen
- Rasetsu no Hana
- Venus Capriccio
- W Juliet II
- Yuria 100 Shiki

=== 2007 ===
- Eensy Weensy Monster
- Faster than a Kiss
- Hana to Akuma
- Hoshi wa Utau
- March Comes in Like a Lion
- Oresama Teacher
- Shitsuji-sama no Okiniiri
- Soko o Nantoka
- Library Wars: Love & War
- Zettai Heiwa Daisakusen

=== 2008 ===
- Chotto Edo Made
- Gou-dere Sora Nagihara
- Grand Guignol Orchestra
- Kamisama Kiss
- Nana to Kaoru
- Ninja Girl & Samurai Master
- Palette of 12 Secret Colors
- The Secret Notes of Lady Kanoko

=== 2009 ===
- Akatsuki no Yona
- Amagami: Precious Diary
- Apocrypha Getter Robo Darkness
- Jiu Jiu
- Koi Dano Ai Dano
- Usotsuki Paradox
- Voice Over! Seiyu Academy

== 2010s ==
=== 2010 ===
- Amagami: Precious Diary - Kaoru
- Sickness Unto Death
- Tokyo Yamimushi

=== 2011 ===
- Hotarubi no Mori e Tokubetsuhen
- Liselotte and Witch's Forest
- Last Game
- Nana to Kaoru Black Label
- Nana Kao Pink Pure
- Onmyōji: Tamatebako
- Photo Kano: Your Eyes Only

=== 2012 ===
- The World Is Still Beautiful

=== 2013 ===
- Ludwig Fantasy: Princess Kaguya
- Tokyo Yamimushi -2nd Scenario- Pandora

=== 2014 ===
- Shinmai Maō no Testament: Arashi!
- Takane and Hana

=== 2015 ===
- Asobi Asobase
- How Clumsy you are, Miss Ueno

=== 2016 ===
- Record of Grancrest War

=== 2017 ===
- Prince Freya

=== 2018 ===
- Ero Ninja Scrolls
- Our Last Crusade or the Rise of a New World
- The Idaten Deities Know Only Peace

== 2020s ==
=== 2021 ===
- Tamon's B-Side
