= Hanalala =

Indonesian manga magazine

- Categories: Shōjo manga
- Frequency: Monthly
- Publisher: Elex Media Komputindo
- Founded: 2006
- Final issue: 2 December 2010
- Country: Indonesia
- Based in: Hakusensha
- Language: Indonesian
- Website: elexmedia.co.id

Hanalala was the Indonesian version of the manga magazines Hana to Yume and LaLa. The magazine was started in 2006. It was published by Elex Media Komputindo, a component of Kompas Gramedia Group, the largest comic publisher in Indonesia. Publication was discontinued with a Farewell Edition (vol 55) on 2 December 2010.

== Manga Series ==
Title	Manga artist
Arakure	Kiyo Fujiwara
VB Rose	Banri Hidaka
La Corda d'Oro	Yuki Kure
Vampire Knight	Matsuri Hino
Twinkle Stars	Natsuki Takaya
With my Brothers	Hari Tokeino
Dragon's Fiance	Nari Kusakawa
Sugar Princess	Hisaya Nakajo
Alice Academy	Tachibana Higuchi
Skip Beat!	Yoshiki Nakamura
Natsume Yujincho	Yuki Midorikawa
Ouran High School Host Club	Bisco Hatori

== See also ==
- List of manga magazines published outside of Japan
