= Oni no Hanayome wa Taberaretai =

Japanese manga series

- First tankōbon volume cover

鬼の花嫁は喰べられたい
- Genre: Romantic comedy
- Manga
- Written by: Keiko Sakano
- Published by: Hakusensha
- Imprint: Hana to Yume Comics
- Magazine: Hana to Yume
- Original run: January 27, 2020 – present
- Volumes: 13
- Original net animation
- Directed by: Akira Ishiguro
- Produced by: Ayato Utsunomiya
- Written by: Keiko Wang
- Studio: Magia
- Released: December 20, 2021 – December 27, 2021
- Episodes: 2

Oni no Hanayome wa Taberaretai (鬼の花嫁は喰べられたい; lit. 'The Demon's Bride Wants to Be Eaten') is a Japanese manga series written and illustrated by Keiko Sakano. It began publication as a one-shot in Hakusensha's The Hana to Yume magazine in January 2020. It later began serialization in the Hana to Yume magazine in May the same year. A 2-episode original net animation adaptation aired in December 2021.

== Synopsis ==
Mashiro was rescued as a child by the powerful demon Shuten-dōji. In order to show gratitude, she promises to sacrifice herself to him at the age of 17. She lost her parents, and lives with relatives who treat her badly. When she gets older, Mashiro wants to marry the demon so he can eat her afterward. But Shuten-dōji has grown fond of her and has no interest in devouring her after the wedding. Mashiro is overwhelmed by the situation, having only prepared herself to be eaten. The demon, on the other hand, only wants to show her his love. At the same time, he doesn't want to appear incompetent in front of his subordinates because he has fallen in love with a human. So he constantly has to weigh his actions, but misunderstandings still arise.

== Characters ==
Mashiro (真白)
Voiced by: Maaya Uchida (ONA, voice drama)
Shuten-dōji (酒呑童子)
Voiced by: Junichi Suwabe (ONA, voice drama)
Yasha (夜叉)
Voiced by: Nobunaga Shimazaki (voice drama)
Komamaru (狛丸)
Voiced by: Kappei Yamaguchi (voice drama)

== Media ==
=== Manga ===
Written and illustrated by Keiko Sakano, Oni no Hanayome wa Taberaretai was initially published as a one-shot in the March 1st 2020 issue of Hakusensha's The Hana to Yume magazine on January 27, 2020. The one-shot was later published in the 9th 2020 issue of Hana to Yume released on April 3 that same year. It later began short-term serialization in Hana to Yume on May 20 that same year. It later resumed serialization on September 19 that same year. Its chapters have been compiled into thirteen tankōbon volumes as of March 2026.

| No. | Release date | ISBN |
|---|---|---|
| 1 | September 18, 2020 | 978-4-592-22341-2 |
| 2 | March 19, 2021 | 978-4-592-22342-9 |
| 3 | August 19, 2021 | 978-4-592-22343-6 |
| 4 | January 20, 2022 | 978-4-592-22344-3 |
| 5 | July 20, 2022 | 978-4-592-22345-0 |
| 6 | December 20, 2022 | 978-4-592-22346-7 |
| 7 | June 20, 2023 | 978-4-592-22347-4 |
| 8 | November 20, 2023 | 978-4-592-22348-1 |
| 9 | May 20, 2024 | 978-4-592-22349-8 |
| 10 | November 20, 2024 | 978-4-592-22350-4 |
| 11 | April 18, 2025 | 978-4-592-22526-3 |
| 12 | November 20, 2025 | 978-4-592-22555-3 |
| 13 | March 19, 2026 | 978-4-592-22574-4 |

=== Anime ===
A 2-episode original net animation adaptation produced by Magia aired on Hakusensha's "Hakusen Anime Channel" YouTube channel from December 20 to 27, 2021.

=== Other ===
A voice drama adaptation was released in the 4th 2022 issue of Hana to Yume on January 20, 2022. It featured the voices of Maaya Uchida and Junichi Suwabe reprising their roles from the ONA, Nobunaga Shimazaki and Kappei Yamaguchi.
