= Hana to Yume =

Japanese manga magazine

- Cover of the 17th issue from 2009 of Hana to Yume, featuring Yona from Mizuho Kusanagi's Yona of the Dawn
- Editor: Hideyuki Takada
- Categories: Shōjo manga
- Frequency: Semi-monthly
- Circulation: 39,417; (July–September 2026)
- Publisher: Tetsuya Maeda
- First issue: May 1974
- Company: Hakusensha
- Country: Japan
- Based in: Chiyoda, Tokyo
- Language: Japanese
- Website: www.hanayume.com

Hana to Yume (Japanese: 花とゆめ; lit. 'Flowers and Dreams'), also known as HanaYume (花ゆめ), is a semi-monthly Japanese shōjo manga magazine published by Hakusensha on the 5th and 20th of every month. The magazine is B5-size, and always comes with furoku or free supplements, such as drama CDs, pencil boards (shitajiki), manga anthologies, stationery, and calendars. Hana to Yume was ranked fourth by Japanese girls as their favorite manga anthology in a survey conducted by Oricon in 2006.

Hana to Yume also has several other magazines under its name, such as The Hana to Yume, Bessatsu Hana to Yume, Shōnen Hana to Yume, and Trifle by Hana to Yume. Hana to Yume+ was launched in April 2026 as an online manga platform. It operates as a free mobile app and website serializing manga under the Hana to Yume imprint as well as original titles.

== History ==
The readers have been 95% female. Its demographic consists of 4% of readers under 13, 62.2% for 13–18 years old, 18.6% for 19–23 years old, and those who are 24 and older comprising the remaining 15.2%.

In 2009, the magazine celebrated its 35th anniversary and collaborated with Yahoo! Japan Comic, which digitally distributes the magazine's serialized manga. Glass Mask by Suzue Miuchi and Hana-Kimi by Hisaya Nakajo are among the 235 titles available to be read online. To commemorate the magazine's anniversary, there was an internet radio broadcast streaming at Yahoo! Japan for an hour and a half. Suzue Miuchi was the guest in the second episode of the radio show, broadcast on May 4, 2009.

In 2020, it was announced that various issues would be delayed or combined due to the COVID-19 pandemic. In 2024, Hana Yume marked its fiftieth anniversary.

=== Hana to Yume Guide Book ===
Hana to Yume Guide Book (花とゆめ GUIDE BOOK) was published and released together with a set of embossed stickers in issue No. 1 of the magazine in 2002 as a furoku to commemorate the magazine's 35th anniversary.

The book contains summaries of titles serialized in the magazine since its inception to April 2009. It also has well-wishing messages from 22 manga artists, among of them are Noriko Sasaki, Natsuki Takaya, Marimo Ragawa, Saki Hiwatari, Suzue Miuchi, Hisaya Nakajo, and Nanpei Yamada who have been serializing their work in the magazine. There is also a special quiz and section containing a history of the magazine together with a chronology of domestic topics since the publication of their magazine.

=== Circulation numbers ===
In 2004, Hana to Yume had a circulation of 300,416 copies. The following year, sales figures dropped to 295,208. In 2006, the sales of Hana to Yume were higher at 289,375 copies, while its competitor, Sho-Comi, had only 260,218 copies. As of 2009, sales declined to 226,542 copies.

== Serializations ==
=== Current ===
- Descendants of Darkness (1996–present)
- Skip Beat! (2002–present)
- Nukozuke! (2013–present) (Note: Nukozuke was initially serialized in Hana to Yume Online in 2012.)
- Oni no Hanayome wa Taberaretai (2020–present)
- The Failure at God School (2021–present)
- Tamon's B-Side (2021–present)
- Spring Storm and Monster (2022–present)
- Otaku Vampire's Love Bite (2022–present)

==== Hiatus ====
- Berry Berry (2009–2010)
- Liselotte & Witch's Forest (2011–2013)
- Dansui! (2013–2018)

=== Past ===
==== 1974–1979 ====
- Arabesque (1974–1975)
- Natsu e no Tobira (1975)
- Sukeban Deka (1975–1982)
- Glass Mask (1976–1997) (Note: Glass Mask was serialized in Hana to Yume from 1976 to 1997. The manga resumed serialization in Bessatsu Hana to Yume in 2008.)
- Patalliro! (1978–1990) (Note: Patalliro! moved to Bessatsu Hana to Yume in 1991.)

==== 1980–1989 ====
- Please Save My Earth (1986–1994)
- Warau Michael (1987–1988)
- Here Is Greenwood (1986–1991)
- Dōbutsu no Oisha-san (1988–1993)

==== 1990–1999 ====
- Earl Cain (1991–1994)
- Baby & Me (1991–1997)
- Songs to Make You Smile (1993–1998)
- Phantom Dream (1994–1997)
- Angel Sanctuary (1994–2000)
- Tower of the Future (1994–1998)
- Yumemiru Happa (1995)
- New York New York (1995–1998)
- Tsubasa: Those with Wings (1995–1998)
- Hana-Kimi (1996–2004)
- Tokyo Crazy Paradise (1996–2002)
- W Juliet (1997–2002)
- Fruits Basket (1998–2006)
- Ludwig Kakumei (1999–2006) (Note: Ludwig Kakumei moved to Bessatsu Hana to Yume in 2006.)
- Never Give Up! (1999–2007)
- Satisfaction Guaranteed (1999–2002)

==== 2000–2009 ====
- Portrait of M & N (2000–2003)
- Global Garden (2001–2004)
- Soul Rescue (2001–2002)
- Tears of a Lamb (2001–2003)
- Blood Hound (2003–2005)
- S.A (2003–2009)
- Gakuen Alice (2003–2013)
- Nosatsu Junkie (2003–2008)
- Wild Ones (2004–2009)
- Mugen Spiral (2004)
- V.B. Rose (2004–2009)
- Bloody Kiss (2004–2005)
- Full House Kiss (2004–2008)
- The Magic Touch (2004–2005)
- Meine Liebe (2004–2006)
- Sugar Princess (2005–2007)
- Fairy Cube (2005–2006)
- Karakuri Odette (2005–2007)
- Happy Cafe (2005–2009)
- NG Life (2005–2009)
- Venus Capriccio (2006–2008)
- Hana to Akuma (2007–2011)
- Twinkle Stars (2007–2011)
- Oresama Teacher (2007–2020)
- Kyō mo Ashita mo (2008–2012)
- Kamisama Kiss (2008–2016)
- Lovesick (2008–2009)
- Love So Life (2009–2015) (Note: Love So Life was initially serialized in The Hana to Yume in 2008.)
- Voice Over! Seiyu Academy (2009–2013)
- Yona of the Dawn (2009–2025)
- Jiu Jiu (2009–2010) (Note: Jiu Jiu moved to The Hana to Yume in 2010.)
- Ōji to Majo to Himegimi to (2009)

==== 2010–2019 ====
- The World Is Still Beautiful (2012–2020)
- Anonymous Noise (2013–2019)
- Colette Decides to Die (2013–2021)
- Cheeky Brat (2013–2021)
- Takane and Hana (2014–2020)
- Sacrificial Princess and the King of Beasts (2015–2020)
- Life So Happy (2016–2018) (Note: Life So Happy moved to The Hana to Yume in 2018.)
- Crashout Schoolgirl and Degen Teacher (2017–2024)
- Furare Girl (2018–2022)
- Azfareo no Sobayōnin (2018–2019) (Note: Azfareo no Sobayōnin was initially serialized in Hana to Yume in 2016 before moving to The Hana to Yume that same year. It transferred back to Hana to Yume in 2018.)
- Nin Koi (2018–2020)
- Koi ni Mudaguchi (2019–2023)

==== 2020–2029 ====
- Meitantei Kо̄ko wa Yūutsu (2020–2022)
- The Cursed Prince's Servant (2020–2022)
- It Takes More Than a Pretty Face to Fall in Love (2020–2025)
- White Rabbit and the Prince of Beasts (2022–2024)

== Related magazines ==
- Bessatsu Hana to Yume
- LaLa
- LaLa DX
- Melody
- The Hana to Yume
- Hanalala
