= Satisfaction Guaranteed =

Satisfaction Guaranteed typically refers to a legally-binding express guarantee of satisfaction in the contract of a sale of goods.

Satisfaction Guaranteed may also refer to:

- Satisfaction Guaranteed (manga)
- "Satisfaction Guaranteed" (short story), a short story by Isaac Asimov
- "Satisfaction Guaranteed", a song by The Firm
- "Satisfaction Guaranteed", a song by Christina Milian from her 2001 self-titled album
- Satisfaction Guaranteed, a 2004 compilation album by Teddy Pendergrass
- "Satisfaction Guaranteed", a song by Alyssa Reid from her 2014 album, Time Bomb
- Satisfaction Guaranteed, a 2014 mixtape by Junglepussy
- "Satisfaction Guaranteed", a song by Two Door Cinema Club from their 2019 album False Alarm
