= The Cursed Prince's Servant =

Japanese manga series

- First tankōbon volume cover

呪い子の召使い (Noroi Ko no Meshitsukai)
- Genre: Fantasy
- Manga
- Written by: Yuki Shibamiya
- Published by: Hakusensha
- English publisher: NA: Comikey
- Imprint: Hana to Yume Comics
- Magazine: Hana to Yume
- Original run: March 5, 2020 – November 18, 2022
- Volumes: 9

The Cursed Prince's Servant (呪い子の召使い, Noroi Ko no Meshitsukai) is a Japanese manga series written and illustrated by Yuki Shibamiya. It was serialized in Hakusensha's shōjo manga magazine Hana to Yume from March 2020 to November 2022.

== Synopsis ==
The series is centered around curses. Renee is a girl who has been cursed with immortality, due to this she has not been able to maintain work. She later gets scouted to serve as a bodyguard to a prince named Albert. Albert is cursed with a poison that kills anyone that touches him, due to this he initially rejects Renee, unaware that she is cursed too. The two eventually bond over each other's curse.

== Characters ==
Renee (レネ, Rene)
Voiced by: Saori Hayami (PV)
Albert (アルベール, Arubēru)
Voiced by: Yoshitsugu Matsuoka (PV)

== Media ==
=== Manga ===
Written and illustrated by Yuki Shibamiya, The Cursed Prince's Servant was serialized in Hakusensha's shōjo manga magazine Hana to Yume from March 5, 2020, to November 18, 2022. Its chapters compiled into nine tankōbon volumes released from August 20, 2020, to February 20, 2023.

The series is licensed in English by Comikey. Comikey began releasing ebook volumes of the series in English on October 11, 2024.

| No. | Original release date | Original ISBN | North American release date | North American ISBN |
|---|---|---|---|---|
| 1 | August 20, 2020 | 978-4-592-21326-0 | October 11, 2024 | 979-8-892-20053-0 |
Chapters 1–4; Extras 1–2
| 2 | February 19, 2021 | 978-4-592-21327-7 | June 1, 2025 | 979-8-892-20054-7 |
Chapters 5–9
| 3 | May 20, 2021 | 978-4-592-21328-4 | August 1, 2025 | 979-8-892-20131-5 |
Chapters 10–14
| 4 | August 19, 2021 | 978-4-592-21476-2 | October 1, 2025 | 979-8-892-20056-1 |
Chapters 15–19
| 5 | December 20, 2021 | 978-4-592-21477-9 | December 1, 2025 | 979-8-892-20057-8 |
Chapters 20–24
| 6 | April 20, 2022 | 978-4-592-21478-6 | February 1, 2026 | 979-8-892-20058-5 |
Chapters 25–29
| 7 | September 20, 2022 | 978-4-592-21479-3 | April 1, 2026 | 979-8-892-202251 |
Chapters 30–34
| 8 | February 20, 2023 | 978-4-592-22433-4 | June 1, 2026 | 979-8-892-20234-3 |
Chapters 35–40
| 9 | February 20, 2023 | 978-4-592-22434-1 | August 1, 2026 | 979-8-892-20237-4 |
Chapters 41–46

=== Other ===
In commemoration of the release of the series' fourth volume, a promotional video was uploaded to Hakusensha's YouTube channel in August 2021. It featured the voices of Saori Hayami and Yoshitsugu Matsuoka.
