= Azfareo no Sobayōnin =

Japanese manga series

- First tankōbon volume cover

蒼竜の側用人 (Azufareo no Sobayōnin)
- Genre: Fantasy
- Manga
- Written by: Shiki Chitose
- Published by: Hakusensha
- Imprint: Hana to Yume Comics
- Magazine: Hana to Yume (2016, 2018–2019); The Hana to Yume (2016–2018)
- Original run: January 20, 2016 – August 20, 2019
- Volumes: 9
- Manga

Shirogane no Ryū-hen
- Written by: Shiki Chitose
- Published by: Hakusensha
- Imprint: Hana to Yume Comics
- Magazine: The Hana to Yume
- Original run: October 25, 2019 – July 28, 2020
- Volumes: 1

Azfareo no Sobayōnin (蒼竜の側用人, Azufareo no Sobayōnin) is a Japanese manga series written and illustrated by Shiki Chitose. It was initially published as a one-shot in Hakusensha's shōjo manga magazine Hana to Yume in October 2015. It was later serialized in the same magazine as a short serial from January 2016. It later was fully serialized in The Hana to Yume magazine from July 2016 to March 2018, before being transferred back to Hana to Yume in April 2018 and running up until August 2019.

== Synopsis ==
The series is centered around a runaway shrine maiden named Rukuru and a dragon named Julius. After running away from home, Rukuru finds work taking care of the dragon Julius in the Kingdom of Azfareo. As she gets to know Julius, she finds out that Julius is actually the dragon king, and can shapeshift.

== Characters ==
Rukuru (ルクル)
Voiced by: Nana Mizuki (drama CD)
Julius (ユリウス, Yuriusu)
Voiced by: Yuichi Nakamura (drama CD)
Rains (レインズ, Reinzu)
Voiced by: Ryōta Ōsaka (drama CD)

== Media ==
=== Manga ===
Written and illustrated by Shiki Chitose, Azfareo no Sobayōnin was initially published as a one-shot in Hakusensha's shōjo manga magazine Hana to Yume on October 5, 2015. It was later serialized in the same magazine as a short serialization from January 20, 2016. It later resumed serialization in The Hana to Yume magazine on July 25, 2016. It was later transferred back to Hana to Yume on April 20, 2018, and ran up until August 20, 2019. Its chapters were collected into nine tankōbon volumes from May 20, 2016, to September 20, 2019.

A spin-off manga, titled Azfareo no Sobayōnin: Shirogane no Ryū-hen was serialized in The Hana to Yume magazine from October 25, 2019, to July 28, 2020. Its chapters were collected into a single tankōbon volume on January 20, 2021.

No.	Release date	ISBN
1	May 20, 2016	978-4-59-221330-7
2	April 20, 2017	978-4-59-221622-3
3	October 20, 2017	978-4-59-221623-0
4	April 20, 2018	978-4-59-221624-7
5	October 19, 2018	978-4-59-221625-4
6	January 18, 2019	978-4-59-221626-1
7	May 20, 2019	978-4-59-221627-8
8	September 20, 2019	978-4-59-221628-5
9	September 20, 2019	978-4-59-221629-2
0	January 20, 2021	978-4-59-221630-8

=== Other ===
A drama CD adaptation was released in the 22nd issue of Hana to Yume on October 20, 2018. It featured the vocal performances of Nana Mizuki, Yuichi Nakamura, and Ryōta Ōsaka.

== Reception ==
The series, alongside This Man is the Biggest Mistake of My Life, won the Women's Comic Prize at NTT Solmare's Digital Comic Awards 2019.
