= Furare Girl =

Japanese manga series

- First tankōbon volume cover

フラレガール (Furare Gāru)
- Genre: Romantic comedy
- Manga
- Written by: Kakeru Tsutsumi
- Published by: Hakusensha
- Imprint: Hana to Yume Comics
- Magazine: Hana to Yume
- Original run: March 5, 2018 – June 3, 2022
- Volumes: 14
- icon

Furare Girl (Japanese: フラレガール, Hepburn: Furare Gāru) is a Japanese manga series written and illustrated by Kakeru Tsutsumi. It was serialized in Hakusensha's shōjo manga magazine Hana to Yume from March 2018 to June 2022, with its chapters collected in fourteen tankōbon volumes.

== Characters ==
Hibiki Akasaka (赤坂 響, Akasaka Hibiki)
Voiced by: Yoko Hikasa (audio drama)
Daichi Aoyama (青山 大地, Aoyama Daichi)
Voiced by: Yuki Kaji (audio drama)
Mameko Sakuranomiya (桜ノ宮 豆子, Sakuranomiya Mameko)
Voiced by: Yū Shimamura (audio drama)
Ayafumi Goto (後藤 彩文, Gotō Ayafumi)
Voiced by: Toshiki Masuda (audio drama)
En Akasaka (赤坂 艶, Akasaka En)
Voiced by: Yūki Ono (audio drama)

== Media ==
=== Manga ===
Written and illustrated by Kakeru Tsutsumi, Furare Girl was serialized in Hakusensha's shōjo manga magazine Hana to Yume from March 5, 2018, to June 3, 2022. Hakusensha collected its chapters in fourteen tankōbon volumes, released from August 20, 2018, to August 19, 2022.

==== Volumes ====
No.	Release date	ISBN
1	August 20, 2018	978-4-592-21665-0
2	December 19, 2018	978-4-592-21666-7
3	April 19, 2019	978-4-592-21667-4
4	August 20, 2019	978-4-592-21668-1
5	December 20, 2019	978-4-592-21669-8
6	May 20, 2020	978-4-592-21670-4
7	September 18, 2020	978-4-592-22308-5
8	November 20, 2020	978-4-592-22309-2
9	March 19, 2021	978-4-592-22310-8
10	August 19, 2021	978-4-592-22360-3
11	December 20, 2021	978-4-592-22361-0
12	April 20, 2022	978-4-592-22362-7
13	August 19, 2022	978-4-592-22363-4
14	August 19, 2022	978-4-592-22364-1

=== Other ===
A "voice card with video", which contains a code to watch a voice drama of the manga, was included with the combined 12th–13th issue of Hana to Yume on May 20, 2020.

== Reception ==
By June 2022, the manga had 1.25 million copies in circulation.
