= Elex Media Komputindo =

Indonesian publishing company

- Logo of Elex Media Komputindo
- Parent company: Kompas Gramedia Group; Grid Network
- Status: Active
- Founded: January 15, 1985; 40 years ago
- Country of origin: Indonesia
- Headquarters location: Central Jakarta
- Distribution: Gramedia
- Publication types: Book; Comic; Magazine; Novel
- Imprints: Level Comics
- Official website: elexmedia.id

Elex Media Komputindo is a publishing company in Indonesia that publishes books, comics, magazines, novels and other print media. Established on January 15, 1985, Elex Media Komputindo is a subsidiary of Kompas Gramedia Group. Elex is headquartered in Tanah Abang, Central Jakarta.

Elex Media Komputindo is known as the pioneer of manga publishing in Indonesia, and is now one of the largest comic publishers in Indonesia.

== History ==
Established in 1985, Elex Media initially published various electronic and computer-themed books. The founder of Kompas, Jakob Oetama, was interested in the potential of manga during his visit to Japan in the late 1980s. In 1991, Elex Media plunged into the manga publishing industry with the publication of Kyoko Mizuki's Candy Candy manga, originally published by Kodansha. Other manga like Kungfu Boy, Doraemon, and Dragon Ball began to follow. The decision of the New Order government to allow the establishment of private television stations was also influential in the spread of outside culture, including the manga. Various private television stations licensed and broadcast Japanese anime which also influenced the interest of comic and manga lovers in Indonesia. Indonesian local comics began to appear in 1994 with the publication of the Imperium Majapahit (Majapahit Empire) by Jan Mintaraga. Elex Media began to adopt the Japanese manga style publishing in 1995 and applied it to local comics in 2001. As of December 2008, almost 7500 comic volumes had been published.

Elex Media established their adult manga imprint, Level Comics in 2005. Their manga titles including 20th Century Boys, Homunculus, Vagabond, Shin Angyo Onshi, and Soul Eater. They also adopted the age rating system for its readers. All adult-themed comics and manga are published under the Level Comics label, while Elex Media is responsible for publishing comics in all age categories or teenagers. In determining the age rating of an individual comic, Elex Media doesn't follow the rating standards in Japan, but rather the suitability of the comic for readers in Indonesia. Elex Media doesn't publish comics or manga with blatant pornography. In August 2009, Elex Media established Romic (euROpean coMIC line). The book titles included in this category are Lucky Luke, Smurf, Michel Vaillant, Yakari, and Spirou & Fantasio.

== Magazines ==
- Hanalala is an Indonesian version of Hana to Yume and LaLa (discontinued)
- Shōnen Star is an Indonesian version of Shonen Sunday (discontinued)
- Shonen Magz is an Indonesian version of Shonen Magazine (discontinued)
- Nakayoshi is an Indonesian version of Nakayoshi (discontinued)
- Champ is an Indonesian version of Korean manhwa titles (discontinued)
- Winnie The Pooh is an Indonesian version of Disney's Winnie The Pooh
- Cars is an Indonesian version of Disney's Cars

== Books ==
Elex Media have also published a range of books in various genres, including self-help books, novels, business and travel genres. Some of its best selling authors are Ippho Santosa and Dedy Dahlan, who both written non-fiction self-help and business books.

Elex Media also translated some foreign books, including, formerly, Microsoft Press titles.

== See also ==
- M&C Publishing
- Level Comics
