= Love So Life =

Japanese manga series

- Cover of the seventeenth and final volume

ラブ・ソー・ライフ (Rabu Sō Raifu)
- Genre: Comedy
- Manga
- Written by: Kaede Kōchi
- Published by: Hakusensha
- Imprint: Hana to Yume Comics
- Magazine: The Hana to Yume; (2008–2009); Hana to Yume; (2009–2015)
- Original run: 2008 – July 18, 2015
- Volumes: 17
- Light novel

Love So Life: When the Cherry Blossom Flowers Bloom
- Written by: Mochizuki Yue
- Illustrated by: Kaede Kōchi
- Published by: Hakusensha
- Imprint: Hana to Yume Comics
- Published: May 20, 2015
- Manga

Life So Happy
- Written by: Kaede Kōchi
- Published by: Hakusensha
- Imprint: Hana to Yume Comics
- Magazine: Hana to Yume; (2016–2018); The Hana to Yume; (2018–2023)
- Original run: April 5, 2016 – April 26, 2023
- Volumes: 4

Love So Life (ラブ・ソー・ライフ, Rabu Sō Raifu), abbreviated as Rabusora (ラブソラ), is a Japanese shōjo manga series written and illustrated by Kaede Kōchi. It was serialized in The Hana to Yume and Hana to Yume from 2008 to 2015. The story follows the daily life of high school student Shiharu Nakamura as she babysits the twin niece and nephew of local TV announcer Seiji Matsunaga. In April 2016, Kōchi launched a short sequel titled Life So Happy which follows the twins as they go into the fifth grade. A new special one-shot was published on April 26, 2023.

== Premise ==
Shiharu Nakamura is a high school girl who works at a daycare where twins Aoi and Akane Matsunaga go. The twins are cared by their uncle, Seiji, because their father abandoned them after his wife suddenly died. When Seiji goes to pick up the twins from daycare one day, he notices that they are particularly attached to Shiharu compared to the other workers. Seiji hires Shiharu as their personal babysitter as he is very busy with work.

== Characters ==
Shiharu Nakamura (中村 詩春, Nakamura Shiharu)
Shiharu is a cheerful and optimistic high school student who works at The Sunflower House Daycare. She becomes acquainted with Akane and Aoi Matsunaga and begins babysitting them later. She is hired to babysit them by their uncle Seiji Matsunaga, who pays her double of what she makes at the daycare. Having lived in an orphanage all her life, Shiharu shows aspirations to be self-sufficient and eventually falls in love with Seiji.
Seiji Matsunaga (松永 政二, Matsunaga Seiji)
Seiji works at JX Television as a TV anchor, thus has a busy schedule with unpredictable hours. He becomes the guardian of Akane and Aoi Matsunaga, his young niece and nephew, after they are abandoned by their father, who is Seiji's brother.
Akane Matsunaga (松永 茜, Matsunaga Akane) & Aoi Matsunaga (松永 葵, Matsunaga Aoi)
Akane and Aoi are two-year-old fraternal twins who live with their uncle, Seiji, after their mother died and father abandoned them.
Rio Yoshī (吉井 梨生, Yoshī Rio)
Rio is Shiharu's best friend and classmate who ends up dating Seiji's neighbor and friend, Takeru Miyagawa.
Takeru Miyagawa (宮川 健, Miyagawa Takeru)
Takeru is Seiji's childhood friend who attends a university. He is easygoing and childish, making him get along with the twins well. Takeru forms a romantic relationship with Shiharu's friend Rio.
Kōichi Matsunaga (松永 浩一, Matsunaga Kōichi)
Kōichi is Seiji's older brother as well as Akane and Aoi's father. After the sudden death of his wife, Misaki, he started to abandon his children. At the end of the series, Kōichi has recomposed himself and decides to live with Akane and Aoi again with the help of Misaki's parents.
Misaki Matsunaga (松永 美咲, Matsunaga Misaki)
Misaki was Kōichi's wife who died in a car accident.

== Media ==
=== Manga ===
Written and illustrated by Kaede Kōchi, Love So Life began publishing in Hakusensha's The Hana to Yume magazine in 2008. The series transferred to Hana to Yume magazine in 2009, ending on July 18, 2015. Hakusensha collected the individual chapters into seventeen tankōbon (compiled volumes) published under the Hana to Yume Comics imprint.

A sequel, Life So Happy, began publishing in Hana to Yume on April 5, 2016, transferring to The Hana to Yume on January 25, 2018. The first three tankōbon volumes were published under the Hana to Yume Comics imprint from December 20, 2016, to April 19, 2019. A fourth volume was published on June 20, 2023.

=== Drama CDs ===
Love So Life was adapted into two audio drama CDs. The first, produced by Marine Entertainment, was released in Japan on March 25, 2010. It starred Mamiko Noto as Shiharu, Daisuke Ono as Seiji, and Miyuki Sawashiro as Akane and Aoi. The second, produced by Hakusensha, was released in Japan on October 4, 2013, bundled with an issue of Hana to Yume magazine. The original voice cast reprised their roles.

=== Light novel ===
A spin-off light novel written by Yue Mochizuki and illustrated by the creator of the original, Kaede Kōchi, was published by Hakusensha on May 20, 2015. The novel was titled Love So Life: Sakura no Hana no Saku Koro ni (LOVE SO LIFE 桜の花の咲く頃に; Love So Life: When the Cherry Blossom Flowers Bloom).

== Manga sales ==
Volumes of the series have ranked in listings of top selling manga in Japan:

Oricon Japanese comic rankings
Volume No.	Peak rank	Notes and refs
4	23	
5	13	
6	6	
7	13	
8	15	
9	10	
11	12	
12	12	
13	18	
14	16	
15	16	
16	6	
17	15	
