= Colette Decides to Die =

Japanese manga series

- First tankōbon volume cover

コレットは死ぬことにした (Koretto wa Shinu Koto ni Shita)
- Genre: Mythic fiction, romance
- Manga
- Written by: Alto Yukimura
- Published by: Hakusensha
- English publisher: NA: Viz Media
- Imprint: Hana to Yume Comics
- Magazine: Hana to Yume
- Original run: November 5, 2013 – October 5, 2021
- Volumes: 20
- Manga

Colette wa Shinu Koto ni Shita: Megami-hen
- Written by: Alto Yukimura
- Published by: Hakusensha
- Imprint: Hana to Yume Comics
- Magazine: The Hana to Yume
- Original run: January 27, 2022 – October 26, 2022
- Volumes: 1

Colette Decides to Die (コレットは死ぬことにした, Koretto wa Shinu Koto ni Shita) is a Japanese manga series written and illustrated by Alto Yukimura. It was serialized in Hakusensha's shōjo manga magazine Hana to Yume from November 2013 to October 2021.

The series is a loose retelling of the myth of Hades and Persephone.

== Plot ==
Colette is the only apothecary in her city and is a workaholic. One day, she becomes so overworked that in her despair she decides to die and jumps into a well. However, upon arriving in the underworld, she is led to its ruler, Hades. Suffering from a fever, he asks her to become his doctor and continue his life's journey. Since she will not abandon a patient, even a deity, she cares for Hades. Over time, she grows closer to the god, who appears as a young man, and learns about daily life in the underworld and the nature of the souls who arrive there.

== Characters ==
Colette (コレット, Koretto)
Voiced by: Sayuri Yahagi (drama CD)
An apothecary who was overwhelmed by the amount of work in the village she lives in, by some twist of Fate, she ends up going to the Underworld to treat Hades.
Hades (ハデス, Hadesu)
Voiced by: Daisuke Ono (drama CD)
Lord of the Underworld, he developed an allergy to the sun, which was later treated by the apothecary who fell into the Underworld.
Dionysus (ディオニュソス, Dionyusosu)
Voiced by: Takuya Eguchi (drama CD)
A demigod, he enjoys wandering in the mortal world, having fun, and eventually leaving. He met Colette when he caught a cold.
Zeus (ゼウス, Zeusu)
Voiced by: Tsubasa Yonaga (drama CD)
King of the gods, he is an infamous womanizer. He ends up hanging out with Colette in the guise of a cat.

== Publication ==
Written and illustrated by Alto Yukimura, Colette Decides to Die initially began publication as a one-shot in Hakusensha's shōjo manga magazine Hana to Yume on November 5, 2013. It later began short-term serialization in the same magazine on March 5, 2014. It later became a full-fledged serialization on July 19 of the same year. The series ended serialization on October 5, 2021. The series' chapters were collected into twenty tankōbon volumes from July 18, 2014, to December 20, 2021. In February 2024, Viz Media announced that they licensed the series for English publication in two-in-one volume edition releases.

An epilogue manga, titled Colette wa Shinu Koto ni Shita: Megami-hen, was serialized in Hakusensha's The Hana to Yume magazine from January 27 to October 26, 2022. The epilogue's chapters were collected in a single tankōbon volume on March 20, 2023.

=== Colette Decides to Die ===
No.	Original release date	Original ISBN	English release date	English ISBN
1	July 18, 2014	978-4-592-21381-9	November 5, 2024	978-1-9747-4727-6
Chapters 1–4; Bonus: "Night and the Melody"
2	March 20, 2015	978-4-592-21382-6	November 5, 2024	978-1-9747-4727-6
Chapters 5–12
3	November 20, 2015	978-4-592-21383-3	February 4, 2025	978-1-9747-5179-2
Chapters 13–19; Side story
4	April 20, 2016	978-4-592-21384-0	February 4, 2025	978-1-9747-5179-2
Chapters 20–25; Side story
5	September 20, 2016	978-4-592-21385-7	May 6, 2025	978-1-9747-5477-9
Chapters 26–32
6	January 20, 2017	978-4-592-21386-4	May 6, 2025	978-1-9747-5477-9
Chapters 33–38; Side stories 1–2
7	May 19, 2017	978-4-592-21387-1	August 5, 2025	978-1-9747-5546-2
Chapters 39–44; Side story
8	September 20, 2017	978-4-592-21388-8	August 5, 2025	978-1-9747-5546-2
Chapters 45–50
9	January 19, 2018	978-4-592-21388-8	November 4, 2025	978-1-9747-5883-8
Chapters 51–56
10	April 20, 2018	978-4-592-21390-1	November 4, 2025	978-1-9747-5883-8
Chapters 57–62
11	September 20, 2018	978-4-592-21676-6	February 3, 2026	978-1-9747-6195-1
Chapters 63–68; Bonus
12	January 18, 2019	978-4-592-21677-3	February 3, 2026	978-1-9747-6195-1
Chapters 69–74
13	May 20, 2019	978-4-592-21678-0	May 5, 2026	978-1-9747-6331-3
Chapters 75–80
14	October 18, 2019	978-4-592-21679-7	May 5, 2026	978-1-9747-6331-3
Chapters 81–86; Epilogue to Chapter 80
15	February 20, 2020	978-4-592-21680-3	August 4, 2026	978-1-9747-6517-1
Chapters 87–92
16	June 19, 2020	978-4-592-22336-8; 978-4-592-22728-1 (SE)	August 4, 2026	978-1-9747-6517-1
Chapters 93–98
17	October 20, 2020	978-4-592-22337-5	November 3, 2026	978-1-9747-6550-8
18	February 19, 2021	978-4-592-22338-2; 978-4-592-10624-1 (SE)	November 3, 2026	978-1-9747-6550-8
19	July 20, 2021	978-4-592-22339-9	February 2, 2027	978-1-9747-6613-0
20	December 20, 2021	978-4-592-22340-5; 978-4-592-22805-9 (SE)	February 2, 2027	978-1-9747-6613-0

=== Colette wa Shinu Koto ni Shita: Megami-hen ===
No.	Release date	ISBN
1	March 20, 2023	978-4-592-22365-8

== Reception ==
By October 2021, the series had over 3 million copies in circulation.
