= Shonen Magz =

Manga magazine

- Editor: Faizal
- Categories: Shōnen manga
- Frequency: Monthly
- Publisher: Elex Media Komputindo
- First issue: June 2004
- Final issue: July 2013
- Country: Indonesia
- Based in: Kodansha
- Language: Indonesian
- Website: elexmedia.id
- ISSN: 1829-5878

Shonen Magz was a Shōnen-oriented manga magazine published monthly by Elex Media Komputindo. It was the Indonesian version of the Japanese Shōnen Magazine and therefore, contained Kodansha-published works only. It was published shortly after the success of the local edition of Nakayoshi.

Despite its orientation towards the male spectrum of manga readers, censorship iwas still considered to be too strict although a lot more lenient when compared to older Shōnen-oriented manga published by Elex.

In July 2013 the magazine was cancelled with the volume 7.

== Manga Series ==
Title	Manga artist	Date of Debut
BECK	Harold Sakuishi	June 2004
Code: Breaker	Akimine Kamijyo	March 2010
Fairy Tail	Hiro Mashima	September 2007
Ghost's Doctor	Yuki Sato	December 2008
Kindaichi Case Files	Seimaru Amagi & Fumiya Sato	September 2005 - March 2006 January 2008
KungFu Boy Legends	Takeshi Maekawa	May 2007 - August 2007 November 2007
Sanzoku Ou	Hirofumi Sawada	June 2004 - March 2006 July 2008
School Rumble	Jin Kobayashi	June 2004
Tokkyu!	Yoichi Komori & Mitsuro Kubo	March 2005
Tsubasa: Reservoir Chronicle	CLAMP	June 2004
Vinland Saga	Makoto Yukimura	January 2008

== See also ==
- List of manga magazines published outside of Japan
