= The Hana to Yume =

Japanese shōjo manga magazine

- Cover of the March 2014 issue featuring Boku no Kotori-san by Mizuho Kusanagi, published by Hakusensha on January 25, 2014
- Categories: Shōjo
- Frequency: Quarterly
- First issue: August 28, 1999
- Company: Hakusensha
- Country: Japan
- Based in: Chiyoda-ku, Tokyo
- Language: Japanese
- Website: www.hanayume.com/thehana/

The Hana to Yume (Japanese: ザ花とゆめ, Hepburn: Za Hana to Yume) is a Japanese shōjo manga magazine published by Hakusensha on 25 January, April, July, and October.

The magazine serves as a supplementary issue to the larger magazine Hana to Yume, featuring one-shots or side stories of series running in Hana to Yume. There are series running irregularly in the magazine.

== Serializations ==
=== Current ===
- Stray Cat & Wolf
- W Juliet II

=== Past ===
- Azfareo no Sobayōnin (transferred to Hana to Yume in 2018)
- Azfareo no Sobayōnin: Shirogane no Ryū-hen
- Colette wa Shinu Koto ni Shita: Megami-hen
- Duel Love: Koi Suru Otome wa Shōri no Megami
- Full House Kiss
- Gakkō Hotel
- Hakuji
- Kenka Bancho Otome: Girl Beats Boys
- Jiujiu (transferred from Hana to Yume in 2010)
- Life So Happy (transferred from Hana to Yume in 2018)
- Love So Life (transferred to Hana to Yume in 2009)
- Pheromomania Syndrome (transferred from Hana to Yume in 2007)
- S.A (transferred to Hana to Yume in 2004)
- Sarashi Asobi
- Toraware Gokko
- Yūjō Survival
