= Happy Cafe =

Japanese manga series

幸福喫茶3丁目 (Shiawase Kissa 3-chōme)
- Manga
- Written by: Kou Matsuzuki
- Published by: Hakusensha
- English publisher: Tokyopop
- Magazine: Hana To Yume
- Original run: July 19, 2005 – November 19, 2009
- Volumes: 15

Happy Cafe (幸福喫茶3丁目, Shiawase Kissa Sanchōme) is a manga series written and illustrated by Kou Matsuzuki. The series was serialized in Hakusensha Shōjo monthly magazine Hana To Yume and the serial chapters collected into fifteen Tankōbon released between July 2005 and November 2009. Publishing companies Tokyopop licensed the manga for release in America and as well Sharp Point Press in Taiwan.

== Plot ==
Uru Takamura is a naive and cheerful girl who is often mistaken as an elementary school student because of her short height. After her mother got remarried, she took a part-time job at a small cafe called Cafe Bonheur. There she meets co-workers Satsuki Shindou a pâtissier who rarely smiles but is actually very kind and Ichirou Nishikawa who falls asleep instantly when he's hungry. Even though they're scary and weird at first glance, something inside them will change as they meet Uru and feelings of love will develop as Uru works hard to bring and show them happiness once again.

== Characters ==
Uru Takamura (高村潤, Takamura Uru)
A 16-year-old, second-year high school student with childish looks (she greatly resembles her mother) and very short height but possessing superhuman strength. Working part-time as a waitress at Cafe Bonheur, she went to live on her own after her mother got remarried in order to give the new couple some space. She was secretly lonely and unhappy with living alone, and at first considered moving back. However, after some encouraging words from Shindou, she decided to patch things up with her parents, and has since kept into contact with and sustained a good relationship with them. She is very naive and perky and always puts the happiness of others before her. She is rather oblivious and is unaware that many of her male friends have romantic feelings for her. She believes that a name is the second most important thing that a person has, next to their body, by their parents and must therefore be cherished. This phrase is later revealed to have come from her father, who is shown in her flashbacks to have been a very kind person who often wore kimono and was the one to have named her Uru, as he wanted her to grow up to be the type of person who could instantly replenish anyone who felt down or drained. Even though she is happy for her mother, she actually wonders about and longs for her father, who died when she was young. She then finds out that she is the reason behind the death of her father.
She is kind of a dense girl since it took her almost the whole series to realize her feelings for Satsuki, because both Ichirou and Mitsuka messed with her. In the final chapter she confessed that the person she loves is in front of her (which was Satsuki), and waited for him for three years (while he went to France).
Satsuki Shindou (進藤咲月, Shindou Satsuki)
A 20-year-old patissier who graduated from school at the age of 15. He always has a displeased, almost yakuza look on his face. He easily loses his temper and is rather unsociable. He was raised by the café manager Nankichi Matsumoto after being abandoned by his mother at a young age. He is very independent and shown to be scared of being alone, due to his mother's abandonment. However, he feels he has no choice but to accept that he will always be alone and thus chooses not to show his feelings or emotions to others as he does not want to burden them. As the story develops, he begins to open up due to Uru's support and her optimistic and comforting personality. He deeply respects Nankichi and sees him as a father figure. He does not drink or smoke, as he had taken after Nankichi's influence. He is terrified of spiders and dislikes crowds. He loves baking because he likes to see the smiles from the faces of the customers. As a child, he believed Nankichi had performed magic whenever he baked. Even though he always scorns at Uru and Ichirou, he is actually a very caring person.
He realized his feelings for Uru after Sou confessed to her, but still had to go to France to learn more about sweets and came back after three years.
Ichirou Nishikawa (西川一郎, Nishikawa Ichirou)
An eccentric 18-year-old high school student who works as a waiter at Cafe Bonheur and the love rival of Shindou. He is often referred to as a weirdo and is always seen dozing-off when hungry. The only way to wake him up is to feed him food. He tends to have a misleading way of speaking, such as when he said "Hello father-in-law" to Uru's stepfather, when he meant to say "Hello stepfather" and calling his housekeeper cocoa-san once when he wanted him to make him cocoa for him. He is repeating his third year in high school solely because he sleeps in most of his classes. He always shows zero interest in everything around him but he actually enjoys playing along with Uru and is a good artist. His father is a doctor and his mother is a designer for children's outfits. His family has a male housekeeper who has been employed with his family since he was in kindergarten. In chapter 15, it is revealed that as a child, he would often fall asleep at the dinner table waiting up for his parents to come home to have dinner with him. Curious as to what Ichirou's reaction would be and in order to wake him up, his mother would shove food in his mouth. Because she did this for several days in a row, Ichirou's eccentric habit of falling asleep when he is hungry and waking up when he is fed developed. He initially has curly hair until he has it cut and has straight hair in chapter 23. He began working in Happy cafe around his first year in high school as Shindou realized his purpose in attracting female customers with his looks in exchange for a cake a day and grew to believe that Happy Cafe gave him something he wanted to do.
He loves Uru so much that he still stick with her even after three years; since, they are in the same university.
Nankichi Matsumoto (松本南吉, Matsumoto Nankichi)
The manager of Cafe Bonheur and the foster father of Shindou who had been mentioned throughout the manga but did not appear until chapter 23. Unlike Shindou, he is very perky, is fond of making jokes, and cries easily as he is very emotional. A running gag throughout the series is that he has weak joints and no sense of direction. According to Shindou, he does not smoke or drink. Despite his looks, he can be a very shrewd person. He is very caring and understanding towards Shindou. He desperately wishes for Shindou to call him "Father" but believes Shindou doesn't (and won't change his last name) because he is still waiting for his biological family. He believes Shindou does not see him as his real family. However, Shindou later explains that he did not call him Father because the people around them looked down upon Nankichi because he had adopted Shindou at such a young age and did not want people to belittle Nankichi because of this. He hopes that Uru will marry Shindou and become his daughter-in-law.
Sou Abekawa (安倍川草, Abekawa Sou)
Kashiwa's younger brother. He is a first-year high school student who helps run bohneur's rival shop, 'Abeekawa Japanese Sweets' along with his brother. He is kind of shy; because of that he often behaves in a surly fashion. However, in front of customers, he fawns a business smile and acts nice and politely towards his customers. Uru tends to call him a monkey face and at first dislikes his seemingly mean disposition, but grows to consider him a friend. Originally, the Abekawa brothers didn't like Bonheur and its staff because they feel their little sister likes the shop better than their own. However, they eventually come to realize that the Bohneur staff (Uru in particular) aren't as bad as they seem. He has a particular hatred for Ichirou because when Sou was three (and Ichirou was six), Sou fell in love with Ichirou at first sight, not realizing he was a guy (he didn't notice Ichirou was wearing pants) and asked him to be his girlfriend, only for Ichirou to bluntly reject him by saying he was a guy. Sou often complains that his first love experience was traumatic and wasted. Sou also develops a crush on Uru.
Kashiwa Abekawa (安倍川柏, Abekawa Kashiwa)
Sou's older brother, whom he deeply respects (aside from his flirtatious ways). He's a third-year high school student and has a huge sister complex on his sister Sakura. This caused him to hate Happy Cafe as he believed they stole his sister from them because she loved to go eat cakes at Happy Cafe, along with most of their female customers and waged a competition against them. However, he eventually develops a truce with them and grows to respect the Happy Cafe employees. He is also aware of Sou's crush on Uru and has attempted to advance their relationship. Kashiwa tends to be a little more laid back than his brother. He is a big flirt.
Sakura Abekawa (安倍川さくら, Abekawa Sakura)
She is the youngest of the Abekawa siblings. Sakura is very cheerful and sweet and loves strawberry desserts. She often plays with Uru in the café and is also close friend with Ichirou's younger brother Jirou. It is revealed that she is actually Sou's and Kashiwa's half-sister, since their real mother died when Sou was one and Kashiwa was three. Their father remarried shortly afterwards. However, despite knowing this, her older brothers still love her and their stepmother as if they were a genuine family and vice versa. A running gag in the story is that whenever Sakura and Uru see each other, they perform unusual gymnastic poses together.
Jirou Nishikawa (西川二郎, Nishikawa Jirou)
The younger brother of Ichirou. He is classmates with Sakura and is good friends with her. His mother loves dressing him up as a girl. He is also very attached to his big brother, but he doesn't like Uru as much. However, later into the manga, where he "approves" of Uru as a potential bride for Ichirou. He has a weak body and is thus susceptible to illness and fatigue, and is not allowed to play with the other kids because of his weak body, with the exception of Sakura.
'Mitsuka Yamasaki (山崎マイル, Yamasaki Mitsuka)
A 15 year old upcoming model and middle schooler (despite her tall height and mature beauty) who debuted in chapter 4. She is incredibly beautiful and described as cutie honey by Uru when she first met her; however, after her father told her not to waste time being a model and to marry the son of a patron company's president in order to further his own success, she decided to run away from home. She later ran into Uru after Uru saved her from some guys hitting on her. Shortly afterwards, she arrived at Cafe Happy where she worked temporarily attracting male customers. However, after Uru learns of her running away from home, she helps Mitsuka confront her father regarding his desire to have her married to someone she doesn't want, and he agrees to let her model and not marry someone she does not want to, on the condition that she return home and keep up her good grades. Since then, she has become a regular customer at happy cafe, and has become great friends with Uru, often visiting her in the shop and texting her messages that tease her about her growing romance with Shindou (she appears to understand they are developing feelings for each other). She also has an unusually large sweet tooth for a model, eating four slices of cake as "starters". Mitsuka resembles her mother but has the same personality as her father. It is shown in chapter 18 that her bodyguard/chauffeur Suzuki(who is nine years older and was adopted by her family after he ran away from her father's abuse) has feelings for her, which she seems to reciprocate.
Kenshi Tokieda (もちろん 健志, Tokieda Kenshi)
Uru's sixth grade cousin from her father's side (he is the son of the sister of Uru's biological father) who resembles her and has had a crush on her since he was young. The two would often spend time together as little children as their mothers went on errands together, and Uru's kindness and gentleness caused him to fall in love with her. He dislikes Uru's closeness to the Happy cafe's employees, as he believes he should be closer to her since he has known her longer. When he tells Shindou that he knows he will laugh at him because of his crush on Uru despite his age, Shindou reprimands him by saying nothing is funny about liking someone, and appears to hold a grudging respect towards him. Despite clearly conveying his feelings to Uru by handing her cookies after saying he wanted to give something to the person he liked, Uru believes this means that he has accepted her as his sister. His classmate, a half Japanese-American girl named Chiyogami Tsukishiro with a fear of men from repeated bullying from the past, has a crush on him because he defended her from some bullies who made fun of her for her American heritage, but he remains oblivious to her feelings, in a similar fashion to how Uru is oblivious to his feelings for her.

== Media ==
=== Manga ===
No.	Original release date	Original ISBN	North American release date	North American ISBN
1	July 19, 2005	978-4-5921-8311-2	January 1, 2010	978-1-4278-1730-3
Uru takes her mother's remarriage as an opportunity to work part-time at the Happy Cafe. There, she befriends Ichirou and Shindou, two of the most unsociable guys she's ever met! To make matters worse, it turns out that Uru is not exactly meant for the waitressing world, as she's a huge klutz. But does true happiness lurk just around the corner?
2	November 18, 2005	978-4-5921-8312-9	March 30, 2010	978-1-4278-1731-0
Inside Cafe Bonheur, the pursuit of happiness continues... When two mysterious young men walk into the cafe to declare war, Uru's passion gets the best of everyone, and they accept the challenge—with one condition: the loser will have to quit the industry for good. However, just before the contest, Shindo sprains his wrist! And when Uru's mother shows up at Bonheur, will she convince Uru to go back home? Cafe Bonheur will have to survive through some turbulent times if it's to stay happy—and in business!
3	March 17, 2006	978-4-5921-8313-6	June 29, 2010	978-1-4278-1732-7
When Uru decides to work at the Happy Cafe, she discovers she is a clumsy waitress, and that her unsociable yet attractive coworkers Ichiro and Shindo are no help.
4	July 19, 2006	978-4-5921-8314-3	August 31, 2010	978-1-4278-1733-4
One complication after another befalls Cafe Bonheur! A surprise visit from Ichiro's little sister throws the cafe into confusion, and it's not just because she seems to inexplicably hate Uru! And after a blackout traps Uru in his apartment, Shindo doesn't sleep at all, causing him to fall ill the next day. Can the cafe survive the day without Shindo to keep everything in order? And can Shindo survive the day without Uru's smile?
5	November 17, 2006	978-4-5921-8315-0	November 2, 2010	978-1-4278-1734-1
Romance and happiness blossoms at the Happy Cafe! Ichiro and Sou Abekawa switch places, forcing Sou to confront his feelings for Uru. An old acquaintance of Shindo's shows up and reveals Shindo hasn't changed very much. The manager of Bonheur finally returns, but decides to test Uru before revealing himself. A bonus chapter reveals how Shindo discovered he enjoyed baking.
6	January 19, 2007	978-4-5921-8248-1	December 28, 2010	978-1-4278-1735-8
Sakura and Jiro become friends at their preschool. But Jiro is weak and has a hard time staying alert. What kind words does Uru have for her little friend? And when Uru's class decides to hold a cafe-themed event at the school festival, Boss sends Uru and Shindo out on a cake hunt... alone together! Will this "date" take their relationship to the next level?
7	April 19, 2007	978-4-5921-8249-8	March 1, 2011	978-1-4278-1736-5
Love is in the air... Or is that just the smell of fresh baked cookies. The school festival is on, but will the trouble stalking Uru ruin it for everyone! Shindo meets an old acquaintance of his mother's and memories come to the forefront. Will an intense hug with Uru help! Meanwhile, the two beauties of Happy Cafe, Mitsuka and Ichiro form an unholy alliance to prevent Uru and Shindo from realizing that they might be in love with each other, but it may be too late!
8	August 17, 2007	978-4-5921-8250-4	May 3, 2011	978-1-4278-1737-2
The matchmaking bug has infected Happy Cafe... And everyone is teaming up! Boss and Inoue are all for Shindo-san, but Abekawa Senior is firmly on his son's team and invites Uru to Sou's school festival in the hopes of gaining her as a daughter-in-law. Meanwhile, Kenshi tries to impress Uru at his athletic meet, but someone else already has her eye on him!... And why is Ichiro acting so weird?!
9	December 18, 2007	978-4-5921-8289-4	June 28, 2011	978-1-4278-1738-9
10	April 18, 2008	978-4-5921-8290-0	-	—
11	August 19, 2008	978-4-5921-8291-7	-	—
12	December 19, 2008	978-4-5921-8292-4	-	—
13	April 17, 2009	978-4-5921-8569-7	-	—
14	August 19, 2009	978-4-5921-8570-3	-	—
15	November 19, 2009	978-4-5921-8580-2	-	—

=== Drama CD ===
A drama CD was released on January 25, 2007, by Marine Entertainment under the same title, and a second was released on October 24, 2007. Akemi Kanda, Kousuke Toriumi and Noriaki Sugiyama were the voice actors of Uru, Shindou and Ichirou. The plot of the second CD includes the three of them going to a theme park and entering a haunted house.

== Reception ==
Johanna Draper Carlson felt that the series quickly began to settle into telling "standard stories" for the genre, and criticised the character designs as looking as though Uru and the men of the cafe are from different series. Carlo Santos described the second volume as "halfhearted", later appreciating that although the story is a fantasy about an ordinary girl being surrounded by hot guys, that the series is a balance of humour and character development. He notes that sometimes romantic cliches are deployed, though, and that the art is mediocre. Katherine Dacey describes the author's artistic strength as being her facial expressions. Steffi MC describes the manga as not being "sickeningly sweet" or melodramatic, and feels the artwork is inconsistent, which she attributes to this being the author's maiden work. Jon Morse writes "The story development isn't particularly special, but this is completely overlooked by the laugh-out-loud comedy that fills the pages. It's an excellent read if you're not a total snob about how a shojo manga operates. I call this work a pioneer!"
