= Mugen Spiral =

Manga series

- First volume of the Tokyopop English language release

夢幻スパイラル (Mugen Supairaru)
- Genre: Fantasy, Romance
- Manga
- Written by: Mizuho Kusanagi
- Published by: Hakusensha
- English publisher: NA: Tokyopop
- Magazine: Hana to Yume
- Original run: January 20, 2004 – September 4, 2004
- Volumes: 2

Mugen Spiral (夢幻スパイラル, Mugen Supairaru; lit. "Dream Spiral") is a two volume manga series written by Mizuho Kusanagi. Premiering in Hana to Yume on January 20, 2004, the series focuses on the growing relationship between the mystic Yayoi, and the prince of demons Ura, who comes to steal her powers. Yayoi uses her powers to seal Ura's powers, and as he stays with her to continue to try to steal her powers and break the spell, they begin to fall in love. Tokyopop published an English language release of the series in North America.

== Plot ==
Yayoi, a mystic with a great deal of powers, is attacked by Ura, the thunder-wielding son of the dying Demon King. Using the Cat God Rosary to seal Ura into the body of a cat, Yayoi is able to defeat him. Though he is her enemy, she carries him home with her.

As the story goes on, Ura is able to assume human form if the rosary is removed. Yayoi can also temporarily release him into his true demon form by breaking one of the 54 beads of the rosary, however for him to break the spell, all of the beads must be broken.

== Characters ==
- Yayoi, sixteen-years-old, she is the 78th in the line of Suzuka mystics. Orphaned after her parents died trying to seal evil spirits, Yayoi remains high-spirited and devoted to her duties as a mystic. When Ura attacks her to steal her powers, she turns him into a black cat. Though he is her enemy, she takes him home to ease her loneliness. While she finds his rudeness irritating, Yayoi also enjoys his company and as the series progresses, grows very fond of him.
- Ura, the son of the current demon king, attacks Yayoi in order to steal her powers of healing so he can save his dying father. Yayoi uses the Cat's God Rosary to seal Ura's true nature and her spell causes him to turn into a black cat when wearing the rosary, and to assume a human form when it is not. Both determined to steal Yayoi's powers and curious about her, Ura remains with her after being sealed, calling her his "prey" and protecting her from other demons after her powers. Though he can be rude and talk crudely, he is kind-hearted and deeply concerned with those he loves. He finds it both annoying and alluring that Yayoi can see through his words to understand his true intentions. He also constantly turns romantic around Yayoi because it's her "weakness".
- Hakuyo is Ura's younger cousin who is determined to see Ura on the throne so he can become his pampered lover. When he, Ura, and Ouga were children, he was promised as a "wife" to Ouga, then Ura, after the brothers had completed a test from their mother to see if they had the right to choose a bride. When he first comes to the real world in search of Ura, he is determined to help kill Yayoi so that he can free Ura from her spell. He eventually warms to her, though, and later tries to free her from Ouga's trap.
- Ouga is Ura's younger brother. Though he loved Ura as a child, he grew increasingly jealous and bitter over his brother, whom he felt their parents favored. Ouga turned to using darkness, a power forbidden for any demon to use, in order to kill his father and brother. He infected their father with the illness that is killing him, and later kidnapped Yayoi to use her as bait for Ura. As he continues using the darkness, it turns on him and tries to consume him. Yayoi and Ura are able to pull him free, but he is taken away by a demon called Mutsu while still unconscious (Mutsu was also the one who taught Ouga how to use the power of Darkness).

== Media ==
Mugen Spiral premiered in Hana to Yume on January 20, 2004, and ran until September 4, 2004. After its run was completed, Hakusensha published the series in two collected volumes in Japan. Licensed by Tokyopop, both volumes have been published in English in North America.

No.	Original release date	Original ISBN	English release date	English ISBN
1	September 17, 2004	978-4-592-18808-7	August 14, 2007	978-1-59816-829-7
Act 1–6
2	February 18, 2005	978-4-592-18156-9	November 26, 2003	978-1-59816-830-3
Act 7–9; Final; Mugen Spiral Special Story; Mugen Spiral Side Story "Some Day"
