= Nosatsu Junkie =

Japanese manga series

- Cover of English Volume 3

悩殺ジャンキー (Nōsatsu Jankī)
- Genre: Comedy, Gender Bender, Romance, School Life
- Manga
- Written by: Ryōko Fukuyama
- Published by: Hakusensha
- English publisher: NA: Tokyopop
- Magazine: Hana to Yume
- Original run: 2003 – 2008
- Volumes: 16

Nosatsu Junkie (悩殺ジャンキー, Nōsatsu Jankī; lit. 'Charming Junkie') is a shōjo manga series by manga artist Ryōko Fukuyama that was serialized in the magazine, Hana to Yume.

== Summary ==
Naka Kaburagi does not have all the qualities a model can have. After being dumped by her senpai because she can't smile like a flower and has a scary face, Naka is determined to get her revenge and to show her senpai that she can smile like a flower just like his female idol Umi Kajiwara. After failing her 19th audition, Naka accidentally bumps into Umi, but Umi is turned out is a male. To keep Naka's mouth shut, Umi gives her the job as his co-model. Always being together and sharing a dark secret, Naka's road to successful modeling has lots of troubles to come, especially when Naka and Umi started to feel funny whenever they are by each other's side.

== Characters ==
Naka Kaburagi (蕪木ナカ, Kaburagi Naka)
A unpopular 14-year-old model who, when nervous, has a face that looks like a criminal's. After getting rejected by her Senpai because he preferred the popular female model Umi's smile to her own, Naka joins the same modeling company as Umi in hopes of finding out the secret to Umi's smile and becoming a popular model to get back at her Senpai.
At first, Naka resents Umi for her charming smile and ability to land modeling jobs seemingly effortlessly, but her resentment soon fades after Naka finds out Umi's secret. The sweet charming female model Umi is really a possessive, cross-dressing male. After finding out his secret, Umi lands Naka a job modeling for the popular clothing brand "Junk" in exchange for her silence, which she agrees to after seeing it as a step towards getting revenge on her Senpai.
Even though Umi is constantly seen harassing and insulting Naka, throughout the series they become close friends and eventually develop feelings for each other. The two share a kiss after Umi finds out that Naka is going for a job for the brand "Heki", a job Umi had been aspiring towards his whole career. Though the kiss was mostly due to Umi's jealousy and hurt, it leads to the two growing much closer in their relationship and even taking on a romantic atmosphere in the later chapters.
Briefly, Tsutsumi Ikue, a high fashion photographer, was a rival for Naka's love but it was shown in later chapters that he was just using Naka as a replacement for his ex-girlfriend, Najafuji Mihane. Naka was torn between Tsutsumi and Umi for a short period of time since she was able to take beautiful pictures both with Umi and with Tsutsumi, which led her to doubt her feelings for Umi, and likewise, he started to doubt her feelings for him. In book 16, she and Umi are shown attending Ikue and Mihane's wedding reception and the two kiss at the end.
Umi Kajiwara (梶原海, Kajiwara Umi)
A 14-year-old cross-dressing supermodel that enchants men and women alike with his charming smile. Umi is known for being a beautiful, charming female supermodel when in reality 'she' is actually a rude pervert who lacks tact and social restraint when being himself. In the beginning of the series Umi's true gender is only known by the president, referred throughout the series as Ms. President, of Boom! modeling agency, the agency that employs both Umi and Naka. While he chooses to reveal his gender to Ms. President, Naka stumbles across Umi's true gender by accident which leads him to offer her a modeling job for the popular clothing brand "Junk" in exchange for her silence.
Soon after Naka discovers Umi's secret it is revealed he is also the president of her high school, something she had never noticed before since he is in his true gender while at school. Also while at school, Umi doesn't hold back his true personality which causes him to have a reputation as "demon" and to be feared by most of the student body. Surprisingly, despite his low attendance Umi has top grades and always makes sure everything for the student council is handled in a business-like fashion.
Umi is hinted to have feelings for Naka at the beginning of the series, shown through his constant sexual harassment and embarrassment when Naka compliments him. When Tsutsumi Ikue appears and shows a very blatant interest in Naka, Umi's feelings become clear and he even confesses he is in love with Naka to Ms. President.
Though Umi is shown to be very two-faced and cruel throughout the series, he has a softer side which is generally shown when dealing with Naka or matters concerning Naka. Also as time progresses Umi is shown becoming more and more masculine in looks and therefore threatening his chance of ever becoming the face for "Heki".
Ikue Tsutsumi (堤 郁依, Tsutsumi Ikue)
A 17-year-old genius photographer who thinks Umi is stiff and dull. He only sees Umi as wearing some kind of mask because he/she never looks natural to him. In volume 4, Ikue reveals to Naka that he likes her, but this is only his way to test Umi and Naka's relationship if they will end up like him and Mihane. He loves strawberry-flavored snacks. He and Mihane end up together again and three years later, they get married.
Though as of lately, Ikue has been covering for Umi when his gender identity was in danger of being discovered. Ikue claims that Umi is his girlfriend, though Umi may seem grossed out by this, he still accepts Ikue's help.
Chihiro Akiyama (秋山ちひろ, Akiyama Chihiro)
A cheerful and popular model from Men-mon, Chihiro dreams of becoming a filmmaker. Often called "Chi", he is Mihane and Ikue's best friend. He has a long-time crush on Mihane Nagafuji. He befriends Umi in a way and they often talk to each other about their love lives. After Ichigo confessed to him, he became confused about his feelings for her. During the festival, he saw a guy patting and talking to Ichigo, and Umi asked him "Are you jealous?" in which Chihiro replied "Really?" and "But I can't forget her." And Umi said, "Getting jealous is the best proof." They end up together.
Ichigo Arita (有田苺, Arita Ichigo)
She is the younger twin of Kaede Arita. Ichigo and her brother design clothes and are known in public as the 17 years old designers, Kaede Koumoto and Ichigo Koumoto. She is pretty small and is actually the same age as Naka and Umi. She fell in love with Chihiro Akiyama and confessed to him and that she will make him fall crazily in love with her. She can see through Chihiro easily like when is he laughing even when he isn't even happy and that he wants to be loved and hugged tightly. She has bad eyesight and can be seen talking to random objects instead of people. Three years later, her hair grew because Chihiro once said she should grow her hair out and they end up together.
Mihane Nagafuji (永藤実羽, Nagafuji Mihane)
She is the older sister of Azu Nagafuji and she was the first ever model for Heki. She used to go out with Ikue Tsutsumi, though their relationship was later severed when she chose her career over him. After much turmoil from both parties, the two come to a mutual understanding thus mending their relationship.
Kaede Arita (有田花楓, Arita Kaede)
He is the older twin of Ichigo Arita. Kaede and his sister design clothes and are known in public as the 17 years old designers, Kaede Koumoto and Ichigo Koumoto. He is actually the same age as Naka and Umi. He has a crush on Naka.
Azu Nagafuji (永藤あず, Nagafuji Azu)
She is the younger sister of Mihane Nagafuji and the daughter of the agency that handles both her and her sister, as well as, Ikue Tsutsumi. She was jealous of Naka in the first volume because Ikue was paying too much attention to her. She wanted to be acknowledged by Ikue as a model.
Akira Minagawa (皆川明, Minagawa Akira)
The fashion designer for Junk who thinks Naka is interesting. He also has an unrequited love for the president of Boom! Agency, Tsuda-san.
Yume Iruma (夢入間市, Iruma Yume)
Umi's neighbor who ran out on her first job. She is also a model. She only knows that Umi goes to a Proctology Clinic. She went to Morocco to recover after she ran out on her job.
Moegi Tsuda (津田 萌葱, Tsuda Moegi)
The president of Boom! Agency. Her company handles both Naka and Umi.
Yusa Uzuki (宇津木 遊佐, Uzuki Yusa)
A male model. At the ending of chapter 59 Naka overhears him on the phone saying, "It's time that I can benefit from Umi."

== Media ==
=== Drama CD ===
There was a drama CD released as a furoku in Hana to Yume.

The cast is as below.

- Naka Kaburagi: Mai Nakahara
- Umi Kajiwara: Junko Minagawa
- Ikue Tsutsumi: Akira Ishida
- Moegi Tsuda: Yumi Fukamizu
- Fuu Kajiwara: Satsuki Yukino
- Shin Kajiwara: Takashi Ōhara

=== Tankōbon ===
Japanese

1. ISBN 4-592-18805-5 published on August 19, 2004
2. ISBN 4-592-18026-7 published on December 16, 2004
3. ISBN 4-592-18027-5 published on April 19, 2005
4. ISBN 4-592-18028-3 published on September 16, 2005
5. ISBN 4-592-18029-1 published on January 19, 2006
6. ISBN 4-592-18274-X published on April 19, 2006
7. ISBN 4-592-18275-8 published on August 18, 2006
8. ISBN 4-592-18276-6 published on November 17, 2006
9. ISBN 4-592-18277-4 published on March 19, 2007
10. ISBN 978-4-592-18278-8 published on July 25, 2007
11. ISBN 978-4-592-18279-5 published on October 25, 2007
12. ISBN 978-4-592-18280-1 published on January 25, 2008
13. ISBN 978-4-592-18573-4 published on May 25, 2008
14. ISBN 978-4-592-18574-1 published on August 25, 2008

English

1. ISBN 978-1-59816-654-5 published on December 12, 2006
2. ISBN 978-1-59816-655-2 published on April 10, 2007
3. ISBN 978-1-59816-656-9 published on August 7, 2007
4. ISBN 978-1-59816-657-6 published on December 4, 2007
5. ISBN 978-1-4278-0237-8 published on April 1, 2008
6. ISBN 978-1-4278-0238-5 published on July 7, 2008
7. ISBN 978-1-4278-0239-2 published on October 14, 2008
