= Never Give Up! =

Japanese manga series

- Never Give Up
- Volume 1 of Never Give Up, published by Tokyopop.

ネバギバ! (Neba Giba!)
- Genre: Romance, Comedy, Slice of Life
- Manga
- Written by: Hiromu Mutou
- Published by: Hakusensha
- English publisher: NA: Tokyopop (former)
- Magazine: Hana to Yume
- Original run: 1999 – 2002
- Volumes: 13

Never Give Up! (ネバギバ!, Neba Giba!) is a shōjo manga by Hiromu Mutou. The story is about a girl named Kiri, who poses as a male model in order to protect her childhood love, a boy named Tohya. Kiri has always looked masculine, inheriting the looks of her fashion-model father. Tohya, on the other hand, has always been revered for his beautiful looks and delicate features. Never feeling worthy enough for Tohya because of her looks, Kiri vowed she would reveal her true feelings to Tohya once she becomes as beautiful as a "princess".

After a photographer sees a photo of him, Tohya is offered a job to be a model. Tohya accepts, but Kiri becomes worried that Tohya wouldn't be an able to defend himself in such an environment. She begs her mother, who owns the modeling agency, to give her a job as a model to be by Tohya's side. Her mother agrees, but because the opening's only for a male model, Kiri would have to pose as a boy. Kiri reluctantly agreed, forgoing her goal of becoming a princess in order to protect Tohya. Soon enough, Kiri and Tohya are surprised by their sudden fame when they start seeing their photos in magazines, posters, and billboards. And not before long, boys and girls start falling for both Kiri and her male model identity.

== Characters ==
Kiri Minase (水無瀬 樹梨, Minase Kiri)

The protagonist of the story, Kiri is a 15-year-old girl known as a "prince" due to her masculine looks she inherited from her fashion-model father. With high eyes, broad shoulders, an inability to grow out her hair, and her 5'9" height, Kiri makes a declaration at the age of four to become a prettier princess than Tohya, so that one day she can marry him. She has never confessed her feelings about Tohya to him, because of her insecurities about her looks that are keeping her from doing so. Kiri enters the world of fashion modeling secretly as a boy under the pseudonym, Tatsuki (タツキ), to watch over and protect Tohya from people who would want to take advantage or hurt him. Most of Kiri's admirers are girls, which just complicate matters more. Kiri can be extremely erratic when it comes to complicated decisions, especially when they involve Tohya.

Tohya Enishi (縁 十夜, Enishi Tōya)

A boy who has lived next door to Kiri since childhood, he is the object of Kiri's affection. Known as a "princess" due to his petite frame and feminine looks, he wants to become a "prince" just as much as Kiri wanting to become a princess. He enters the world of fashion modeling when a client of the Minase Modeling Agency becomes infatuated with a photo of him. Tohya has a rather stoic personality, and is unaffected by all the attention he receives from the girls at his school. He has feelings for Kiri and tries to hide it from his manager so he won't harass her. From time to time, he likes to remind Kiri of her goal to become "a princess".

Natsu (奈津)

Kiri's best friend and confidante. She affectionately likes to jump and tackle Kiri with a big hug upon seeing her. Natsu is the only person other than Tohya and Kiri's mother that knows of Kiri's secret male model identity. With her blunt honesty, advice and opinions, Natsu is always there for Kiri and keeps her grounded. Natsu is also very protective of Kiri, once threatening Tohya that she won't "forgive him" if he ever hurts Kiri. It is confirmed that she likes Kiri and would date her if she were a man.

Akira (アキラ)

An accomplished male model, Akira is the son of the photographer that hires Tohya and "Tatsuki". He works with Tohya and Tatsuki in their first photo shoot, and instantly takes a dislike to Tohya because of his looks and lack of emotion in his poses. Although he doesn't know Tatsuki is actually Kiri posing as a boy when they first meet, Akira becomes attracted to Tatsuki and kisses "him" when Tatsuki apologizes for punching Akira after he insulted Tohya. Akira claimed that Tatsuki was kind of "girly" and "cute". Akira then becomes attracted to Kiri (without her disguise on) after running into her on the street. At first Akira is only playing around with Tatsuki/Kiri, but in the end he falls in love with her. Akira knows that Tatsuki is Kiri, but he chooses to say nothing. Akira persistently makes advances at Kiri, but Kiri always rejects his offers.

Satsuki Minase (水無瀬 幸希, Minase Satsuki)

Kiri's mother is the owner of her own modeling agency, the Minase Modeling Agency. Short on a male model, she gave Kiri a job as a model only if she posed as a boy. Kiri reluctantly agreed so she could spend time with Tohya and protect him at the same time. The only conditions her mother gave Kiri were that the public can not find out that "Tatsuki" is a girl, and that no one discovers that she is her mother. She stresses that if these secrets were to get out, not only would Kiri be fired, but it would put the reputation of her agency at risk. She likes to tease Kiri about her appearance from time to time.

Kiri's Father (樹梨の父, Kiri-no-chichi)

Kiri's father is a top model. He is divorced to Kiri's mother because he is always busy working and can't stay in one place, because he also works overseas. He looks exactly the same like Kiri, and so he helps Kiri every time Tatsuki/Kiri is suspected as the same person. He is cheerful and rather childish at times. It seems like he still loves his wife and wishes to re-marry but Kiri's mother always rejects him.

Kanou and Riku

Kanou and Riku work at the same company as Akira and participated in the Fashion show. These two competed for the 'exclusive' contract with the other three. During the time they spent with Kiri and the others, they began helping one other, mainly Kanou and Kiri, but Riku helped mentally. Kanou also really cherishes Riku because of what he had done in the past. They have a special relationship and really close to each other. Kanou is half Chinese, and Riku and Kiri tell him that his "blood" has much history. So that is how the story begins.

== Reception ==
Publishers Weekly noted the "volatile insecurity" of the characters that "may accurately represent how adolescents view themselves", but thought that "adult readers are apt to giggle". Manga critic Jason Thompson commended the artwork and the character of the heroine, but was less complimentary about the plot and the unsympathetic male lead.

== See also ==
- Ranma ½
- Hana-Kimi
- Girl Got Game
