= Bloody Kiss =

Japanese manga series

- Cover of Bloody Kiss volume 1 as published by Hakusensha under the Hana to Yume Comics imprint.

ブラッディ KISS (Buradī Kisu)
- Genre: Romance, Supernatural
- Manga
- Written by: Kazuko Furumiya
- Published by: Hakusensha
- English publisher: NA: Tokyopop
- Magazine: Hana to Yume
- Original run: May 2004 – March 2005
- Volumes: 2

Bloody Kiss (Japanese: ブラッディ キス, Hepburn: Buradī Kisu) is a Japanese shōjo manga written and illustrated by Kazuko Furumiya.

The series was serialized in Hakusensha's semi-monthly shōjo manga magazine, Hana to Yume from May 2004 to March 2005. The chapters were then compiled and two volumes were released. It is licensed in English for North American distribution by Tokyopop.

== Plot ==
Kiyo Katsuragi is a young girl still attending school, when she is about to inherit her grandmother's mansion given to her mother. When she enters, she finds out she is also living in the mansion with two vampires, Kuroboshi and his servant Alshu. Things get even crazier when Kuroboshi decides to make Kiyo his "bride". A vampire's "bride" is a female human who will become his only source of blood. Even though Kiyo seems to like Kuroboshi, she is embarrassed when he tries to suck her blood, which is a problem for Kuroboshi.

Then, Kiyo's childhood friend tries to stop their growing affection, because he is afraid that Kiyo will be tainted by the vampire. Kiyo is then told that if she wants to be with Kuroboshi forever and be his bride, she will have to kiss him. There is one side effect—she might turn into a vampire herself!

== List of characters ==
Kiyo Katsuragi
A very beautiful girl who inherits her grandmother's old mansion. As soon as she moves in, she finds out that there are two vampires living there: Kuroboshi and Alshu. At first, Kiyo and Kuroboshi's relationship was a flirt-and-hit relationship, but later on in the manga, Kiyo slowly starts to have feelings for Kuroboshi. Kiyo is a very nice and trusting person, and she often helps out her friends. This confuses Kuroboshi, but it makes him admire her more. Later on, she decides to take on a part-time job to earn some money since both Alshu and Kuroboshi are unemployed. Her feelings for him flutter from admiration to annoyance and then to a bit of a crush. When Sou-kun returns, she feels that she must hide Kuroboshi's vampiric nature from him, especially since his sword can already detect evil auras. However, this causes Kuroboshi to grow jealous and eventually leads him to bite her. Sou-kun witnesses this and finds out that he is a vampire. She does not feel anything toward Sou but friendship, and when she is ready to accept the position of Kuroboshi's bride, Sou-kun warns her that there is a chance she will become a vampire if she does. This makes her very unsure and thus, Kuroboshi thinks she does not want to stay with him. He ignores her until the play, when he confesses his true feelings. Kiyo is touched and she kisses him right then, sealing their bride contract. They end up together, but Sou still promises to be her guard since Kuroboshi is so weak - only being hit by the back of his sword and then unable to walk afterward.

Kuroboshi
A very handsome dhampir (half-human, half-vampire) who lived in the old mansion Kiyo inherited. As soon as he sees Kiyo he starts flirting with her and calling her his "bride". It is unknown at first if Kuroboshi really likes Kiyo for herself or for her sweet blood. Later though, he is very jealous if Kiyo is near any guy, and if anyone is being mean to her, he retaliates quite fast. He also likes to suck Kiyo's blood (although he does not succeed very often). As the series progresses, his feelings are declared to be serious. When Kiyo is unsure of how she feels about him, he becomes angry and doesn't talk to her till the play. Then, in front of the audience, while in the middle of a battle with Sou-kun, he wholeheartedly declares that with all his body and soul, he loves her.

Alshu
A very handsome vampire who is serving Kuroboshi. He is very carefree and appears only moments before Kuroboshi and Kiyo are about to kiss or propose to each other. He also has a violent side, only provoked if someone attacks his master.

Minako
Kiyo's deceased grandmother who took in Kuroboshi and Alshu when they were wandering and homeless. She is said to have given Kuroboshi the feeling of 'warmth' during his childhood. Kuroboshi was ostracized by the vampires because he was half vampire, half human. Minako-sama was hinted to look somewhat like Kiyo herself, and also have similar personality traits.

Sou Mizukami
Kiyo's childhood friend who trains in the mountains. He came down from his training to see Kiyo again-this time to protect her. This is because in the past, he was a cowardly boy, always relying on Kiyo to repel evil spirits (exorcism). He admired her strength and vowed to be stronger in order to return the favor. His sword detects any evil aura-and sure enough, whenever Kuroboshi is around, his sword detects it. He proclaims himself Kiyo's bodyguard when he learns that Kuroboshi is a vampire. He fights Kuroboshi during the Romeo and Juliet play, and he still claims his position as bodyguard because he claims that Kuroboshi is weak.

== Volumes ==
No.	Original release date	Original ISBN	English release date	English ISBN
1	December 18, 2006	978-4-592-18856-8	August 11, 2009	978-1-4278-1579-8
2	September 19, 2007	978-4-592-18731-8	November 3, 2009	978-1-4278-1580-4

== Reception ==
The series ranked 9th in About.com 2009 Readers Poll for Best New Shōjo Manga. However, Carlo Santos of Anime News Network and Connie C. of Pop Culture Shock were not that positive on their reviews. Santos said "The main characters are generally appealing and the chemistry works, but the overall execution falls flat", citing the frequency of vampiric neck-biting as the main drawback—which led him to consider it "just mindless formulaic fanservice". Connie C. criticized the two main characters as stereotypical and its plot for using "a few terrible shojo plot devices". Nevertheless, she appreciated the development of their romantic relationship, which attracted her to read the second volume. Connie C. and Santos dubbed the art as "confusing" and "mess" respectively, although she said the panel layouts "tend to muddy up the flow of the page", while he affirmed that it "help to keep the story moving at a decent clip, and the elegant sense of character design guarantees some attractive visuals".

Santos was again critical of excessive usage of neck-biting, "the epitome of all vampire clichés", and for this and other clichés labeled it "just a copy of 80% of all other shoujo manga", affirming it is "a series designed to be forgotten just like all its other clones". Despite this, he considered Bloody Kiss "a refreshing tongue-in-cheek affair that isn't afraid to poke fun at itself—and the entire genre. ... All in all, the story moves at a fun, bouncy pace, and the delicate lines in the artwork make this one go down nice and easy." For the series conclusion, Connie C. wrote that "It's an okay story that manages to be a light and enjoyable read, if nothing spectacular. I was a little disappointed that such common plot devices were used in this volume ..., but I really didn't expect too much from the series otherwise. The main draw is the adorable (if shallow) romance between Kiyo and Kuroboshi. Neither really stand out as terribly developed or original characters, but the chemistry between them is believable."
