= Tower of the Future =

Japanese manga series

- Cover of the third volume of Tower of the Future

未来のうてな (Mirai no Utena)
- Genre: Romantic comedy, science fiction
- Manga
- Written by: Saki Hiwatari
- Published by: Hakusensha
- English publisher: NA: CMX Manga
- Magazine: Hana to Yume
- Original run: September 5, 1994 – December 19, 1998
- Volumes: 11

Tower of the Future (Japanese: 未来のうてな, Hepburn: Mirai no Utena) is a Japanese manga written and illustrated by Saki Hiwatari. The manga was serialised in Hakusensha's Hana to Yume from 1994 to 1998 and collected in eleven tankōbon. The series has been licensed in North America by CMX Manga, which released the manga's eleven tankōbon volumes between August 16, 2005, and June 18, 2008. It is also licensed in France as Mirai no Utena - La Mélodie du futur by Delcourt.

== Plot ==
Takeru Matsuyuki, a junior school student, is forced to aim for Hinami Private High School for his senior school selection exam by his mother, who wants him to be bilingual like his father. On Hinami's open day, Takeru sees his own incentive to go to Hinami: Ichigo Suzunari, a girl with a melodic voice. Just before his exams, Takeru's mother is critically injured in a car accident. On her deathbed, she reveals to Takeru that he has an older half-sister, Hyoju, living alone in England. His mother feels guilt for refusing to take in Hyoju after her mother died and wishes for Hyoju to come to Japan and live with them. Takeru's mother then dies. After a period of unrest between Takeru and his father, Takeru allows Hyōju to live with them. Takeru does poorly in his senior school selection exam and ends up in Tennendo, a public high school. However, he sees Ichigo there as well. He confesses his love for her and she off-handedly accepts. He meets Zen Hokuoin, a kindergarten boy, who shows up at odd moments and innocently and strangely gives wise advice to Takeru. Takeru discovers that Ichigo's older brother, Kazuki, is a photographer. He, with the help of his classmates, Seika Nishizawa and Yoruko Tōsaka, enters a modeling agency competition in which Kazuki is one of the judges. Takeru's classmate, Kouki Noda, is inadvertently entered into the competition as well. Kazuki shows his over protectiveness of his sister to Takeru coupled with rumours that Kazuki kisses his sister daily, Takeru turns to the Hokuoin family for help. Zen finds out that Kazuki is infected by the Noize, a parasite that amplifies the host's strongest desires. He takes Takeru to his house so that his sisters can explain that he is part of the Nan'itsu family, tasked with opposing the Noize. The head of the Hokuoin family, Jin, and his family expels the Noize from Kazuki's body. Later, Kazuki asks Takeru to introduce him to Hyōju.

In the school holidays, Takeru works part-time in a game arcade with Hotei, one of the Seven Stars, the group opposing the Nan'itsu family. Hotei's androgynous friend, Hijiri, informs Takeru that his true love is not Ichigo but Yoruko. He also teaches Takeru to climb the "tower", where the past and future of people's lives can be seen. Ichigo, Takeru and Noda were planning for a trip to the beach with their friend, but Takeru subconsciously climbed the tower and warped them 14 years in the past to 1982. The trio have to survive in the past without using ¥1000 notes and ¥500 coins.

== Manga ==
Tower of the Future is written and illustrated by Saki Hiwatari. The manga was serialised in Hakusensha's Hana to Yume and collected in eleven tankōbon volumes which were released between March 1995 and April 1999. The series has been licensed in North America by CMX Manga, which released the manga's eleven tankōbon volumes between August 16, 2005, and June 18, 2008. It is also licensed in France as Mirai no Utena - La Mélodie du futur by Delcourt which released the manga's eleven tankōbon volumes between July 12, 2007, and May 14, 2008.

=== Chapter list ===
No.	Original release date	Original ISBN	English release date	English ISBN
01	March 1995	978-4-592-12001-8	August 16, 2005	978-1-4012-0814-1
Level 1 - Birth of a Heroine
02	August 1995	978-4-592-12002-5	February 1, 2006	978-1-4012-0815-8
Level 1 - Birth of a Heroine
03	February 1996	978-4-592-12003-2	May 3, 2006	978-1-4012-0816-5
Level 1 - Birth of a Heroine
04	June 1996	978-4-592-12004-9	August 30, 2006	978-1-4215-1781-0
Level 2 - Darling Honey; Side Story - Darling Honey
05	October 1996	978-4-592-12005-6	November 1, 2006	978-1-4012-0818-9
Level 2 - Darling Honey
06	February 1997	978-4-592-12006-3	March 31, 2007	978-1-4012-0819-6
Level 3 - The Future We Must Return To
07	July 1997	978-4-592-12007-0	June 20, 2007	978-1-4012-0820-2
Level 3 - The Future We Must Return To
08	February 1998	978-4-592-12008-7	September 30, 2007	978-1-4012-0821-9
09	June 1998	978-4-592-12009-4	December 31, 2007	978-1-4012-0822-6
10	January 1999	978-4-592-12010-0	March 31, 2008	978-1-4012-0823-3
11	April 1999	978-4-592-12011-7	June 18, 2008	978-1-4012-0824-0

== Reception ==
Mania.com's Jarred Pine commends the first volume of the manga for "[grabbing] the reader's interest and feed them with potential", saying, "while the story of family in conflict gives the manga some semblance of structure, it's the mysterious other small elements that are introduced that really piqued my interest in finding out just where this supposed fantasy story will go." A review of the second volume criticises the manga for its "snail's pace" in introducing Takeru's half-sister, Hyoju, at his "mother's deathbed". Pine's review of the third volume criticises the manga for "the severe lack of character development [that] really hinders the supporting cast, as I'm pulled along with the drama and given contrived explanations". Mangalife's Dan Polley commends the manga for "Takeru and Ichigo's budding relationship". However, "toward the end of the volume, when the relationship becomes more of a focus, Ichigo seems to self-destruct from some inner battle. It's interesting, yet it's boring, too, as her reactions show just how sensitive she is and seems to stereotype her as a high school girl who can't control her own feelings".
