= V.B. Rose =

Japanese manga series

- Cover of V.B. Rose as published by Hakusensha

V·B·ローズ (V.B. Rōzu)
- Genre: Romance
- Manga
- Written by: Banri Hidaka
- Published by: Hakusensha
- English publisher: NA: Tokyopop
- Magazine: Hana to Yume
- Original run: February 20, 2004 – February 20, 2009
- Volumes: 14

V.B.Rose (Japanese: V·B·ローズ, Hepburn: V.B. Rōzu; lit. "Velvet Blue Rose") is a Japanese manga written and illustrated by Banri Hidaka. The manga was serialized in Hakusensha's shōjo magazine, Hana to Yume from February 20, 2004, to February 20, 2009, ending at 83 chapters. The individual chapters were published into 14 bound volumes by Hakusensha from August 19, 2004, to May 19, 2009. The manga is licensed in North America by Tokyopop, and in Italy by Jpop.

== Plot ==
Ageha Shiroi finds out her sister, Hibari, is pregnant and she will have to be married in less than a month. When shopping with her friend, Mamoru, they meet Yukari Arisaka and Mitsuya Kuromine. Ageha finds out that the bridal store that Hibari is going to is owned by the two men. But during one of their visits, Ageha loses her temper about the wedding and accidentally injures Mitsuya's hand.

To make up for it, Ageha decides to help finish Hibari's wedding dress. Soon after the wedding in volume 2, Yukari offers a part-time job for Ageha at V.B.R. Ageha accepts this job, not knowing that it will ultimately change her life, and cause her to make new friendships-and even love.

== Characters ==
There are many characters in the story, most of them that are the V.B.R. staff and classmates.

Ageha Shiroi

The heroine of this manga who has a huge sister complex at the beginning of the series and loves to make bags. In order to get her to accept her abrupt wedding, her sister takes her to Velvet Blue Rose, where she meets Yukari Arisaka and Mitsuya Kuromine. Ageha quickly becomes fond of the shop and finally decides to support her sister's wedding by helping make her dress. She then continues on to work in the shop as a part-time employee. Her best friend Mamoru Sakashita, goes to Houjou High School rather than the private all-girls school, Nishimiya High School, Ageha attends. Ageha is also close to her friend's little brother Nagare, who she calls "Nat-chan". Later on in the series Ageha starts to fall in love with Yukari, but will not confess her feelings in fear of losing her place in V.B.Rose, and due to the fear of being rejected. She is oblivious about love, not noticing Nagare's obvious feelings and Yukari's as well. She makes friends with Tsuyu Ichihashi and many of the others. At first, she is terrified of Kana, but learns that she is over Yukari and wishes her luck, only hating her because she was "too happy and overused the word cute". In recent chapters, Nagare confesses his feelings for her, with Yukari listening accidentally over the phone. This causes Ageha to become confused, and Yukari mad. However, she and Yukari confess to loving each other in a nearby park, and they become an official couple. She eventually helps Yukari to reunite with his estranged mother, the famous actress Ran Kashiwagi, who he had not seen for eighteen years. Ran drags her on a "heart-to-heart" shopping spree, buying her many clothing items and shipping the others to her house. Ran wants Ageha to inform her on what she could do to make Yukari happy. Ageha is shown to get along well with children, such as making handmade toys for her niece Madoka and becoming attached to Sakura and Maki and Kazuha's daughter, Hina.

Yukari Arisaka

The owner of V.B.Rose despite being a young age of 22. His relationship with Ageha is negative at the beginning of the story, often violently hitting her and even physically throwing her out of V.B.Rose on two occasions. However, as the story progresses, Yukari begins to accept Ageha as a fellow designer. Despite, seeming to be rude and violent, Yukari is actually a kind person who greatly treasures those close to him. Yukari inherited the shop after his father (Aoi Arisaka) died of illness two years prior to the beginning of the series. His mother, a famous actress named Ran Kashiwagi, divorced Yukari's father when he was 5 years old. Two years before his death, Yukari's father married Ririko from the bridal shop Rosa, which is closely aligned with V.B.R. She then gave birth to Sakura, Yukari's young half-brother. Yukari and Sakura have practically the same face, which is also strikingly similar to their father's. In volume 3, Mitsuya teases Yukari about Ageha being "cute", which makes Yukari realize he is in love with Ageha. However, he is afraid she doesn't feel the same way about him so refrains from showing any signs of his love. Yukari's old girlfriend Kana Hirose from high school, now a corsage maker, also shows up later in the series. Yukari often feels traumatized by their relationship when thinking about Ageha. He is often jealous of Nagare Sakashita or any male who happens to look in Ageha's direction, sometimes including Mitsuya and Kyouichi Sekiguchi. In recent chapters, Yukari overhears Nagare telling Ageha that he loves her while she was talking to Yukari over the phone, causing him to get jealous and angry. However, the two manage to confess to one another and become an official couple. Mitsuya makes him red rice, which he "happily" eats. In Volume 10, his estranged mother, Ran Kashiwagi, arrives at VB Rose, presenting Yukari with a new car. He refuses to take it, and she offers to buy newer furniture for the inside of the shop. She finds it humorous that Ririko had not grown since the last time that she had seen her, and believed that Sakura was a miniature Yukari, and that Yukari himself was Aoi. Yukari tries to push her away. Ageha eventually gets taken away by Ran to do a heart to heart shopping spree about how to make Yukari happy. He eventually reconciles with his mother, to Ageha's relief. He is shown becoming more afraid of Nagare and Mamoru Sakashita each time they appear.

Mitsuya Kuromine

A fellow Patterner at V.B.Rose and one of Yukari's only friends. He is often viewed as a pervert, especially by Ageha, who is constantly hit on and hugged by him. Despite being a flirt, Mitsuya is often the person that both Yukari and Ageha talk to about their feelings for each other. Like Yukari he is also skilled at making clothing and is extremely passionate about his work, enough to drop out of college to work at V.B.Rose. He is very fond of his younger brother Shizuya and enjoys teasing him whenever he gets the chance. He is considered an in-between, as he knows of Ageha and Yukari's feelings towards one another, though he cannot tell. He does the cooking in the V.B. Rose household. He was friends with Ichihashi when they were children, and when they reunited, thanks to Yukari, he began to treat her differently. She loves him, however, and finds his menacing behavior intriguing. In volume 11 it is implied that he has feelings for her as well. He also smokes cigarettes, and wears cologne to block the smell. He manages to help Yukari with his love issues by telling him where to find Ageha after she runs out of V.B. Rose crying, and makes him red rice when he returns with victory in winning Ageha's heart. Makoto Ohara was his senpai in high school. His role in the story was very short in the latest volumes, but Volume 11 entails the details of Mitsu and Yukari's first encounter.

Hibari Shiroi {Ohara}

Ageha's older sister. At the beginning of the series Ageha views her sister as a perfect idol, only to have the image smashed by Yukari, who reveals that Hibari is actually extremely clumsy and absent minded. Hibari and Ageha maintain a strong bond throughout the manga. She eventually gives birth to a healthy baby girl, who is named Madoka. Her husband is Makoto Ohara. She had an easy birth with Madoka and enjoys it when Ageha makes gifts for her. She is said to be Maki's number one fan and often appears in the story to give the Shiroi family souvenirs from Makoto's business trips. Latest chapters show Madoka's growth into a toddler. She was very possessive of Ageha as a child and fears that she will stalk her daughter once she goes to preschool.

Makoto Ohara

Hibari's husband. He is very carefree and "boring", and Ageha felt that he was not good enough for Hibari. Her feelings change once she realizes that he is caring and loving of her. He lives with the Shiroi family for a short amount of time when Hibari was pregnant. He was Mitsuya's senpai in high school. He dreams of raising Madoka to say "I love you, daddy." He is often away on business trips and brings back many souvenirs for his in-laws.

Mamoru Sakashita

Ageha's best friend. She is very over-protective of Ageha. Although she is nice, she also haves a sadistic side to her like her brother. She is friends with Rei Akiyoshi (a cross-over character from Hidaka's Sekai De Ichiban Daikirai) and Shizuya Kuromine, and they often hang out with Ageha. Nagare is her younger brother by one year. She supports Ageha in her pursuit of Yukari, but is also shown to often help Nagare. However, she claims to like Yukari, if just a little bit. She is often Ageha's support. She is scared that if Ageha and Nagare went out with one another, they would break up and ruin their friendship. She helps Ageha get together with Yukari in chapters 10-43, though she supports Nagare in not giving up. She is shown to have a small crush on Shizuya, as she picks on the ones who she loves. She is a big fan of Ran Kashiwagi but refused to meet her up close, deciding it is better to watch from afar. Yukari is fearful of her.

Nagare sakashita

Mamoru's younger brother, who is in love with Ageha. Although he seems to be a sweet boy, he seems to also have a sadistic personality, that Ageha is unaware of. He becomes jealous of Ageha's feeling towards Yukari and often tries to secretly sabotage their relationship. He tells Yukari that Ageha seems unhappier lately, and that causes him to back off for a small amount of time. In recent chapters, he saw Ageha walking home from V.B. Rose after going to visit Yukari, only to find him being overly friendly with Kana, and he comforts her. Yukari then calls her, and Nagare interrupts their romantic moment by confessing his feelings towards her. This causes Yukari to become jealous and mad. Nagare then walks Ageha home and tells her he'll wait for her answer. Then Ageha catches a cold and doesn't see Yukari again until after the new year. Yukari and her try to take up small talk but the topic of Nagare's confession on the phone is awkwardly brought up. Ageha, without realizing what she's saying, tells Yukari that she is unsure of how to respond to Nagare's confession and hearing this, Yukari gets mad and lashes out at Ageha, causing her to run away. He then claims that he will not give up in claiming her heart and tries to find her. Yukari is fearful of him and Mamoru. Mamoru both supports Ageha's relationship with Yukari, but also Nagare's crush towards her. He can be considered the antagonist of the story despite his few number of appearances, trying to destroy Yukari and Ageha's love.

Tsuyu Ichihashi

A bead specialist who is an old friend of Mitsuya and Yukari. Tsuyu went to the same elementary school as Mitsuya describing him as "a very mature, kind, helpful boy then." but shortly moved after graduation. Tsuyu then befriended Yukari in high school and was introduced to his friend who turned out to be Mitsuya. Despite his being a "kind boy", from then on Mitsuya shows a sadistic side around her, always teasing her when he has the chance. Despite this Tsuyu still is in love with Mitsuya. She thinks that Yukari and Ageha are beautiful people and loves being in their presence. She loves beautiful people and calls Ageha a "big breasted beauty" upon meeting. She becomes Ageha's friend over time and they often meet at a cafe to eat sweets and talk. She is also friends with Kana Hirose. She and Ageha promised not to give up in their pursuits of love. In volume twelve, the staff of V.B.R. resolve to "rescue" her from an arranged marriage meeting (omiai) so she and Mitsuya can be together, and succeed in doing so.

Kana Hirose

Yukari's high school girlfriend. She is now a corsage maker. Her current relationship with Yukari is one with constant bickering, though Ageha notes that she is in his inner circle. At first glance, she appears to hate Ageha because of her relationship with Yukari. However, it turns out she initially disliked her because she over uses the word "cute" and is too happy. She is glad that she is going out with Yukari and tells her that she will need good luck. She is friends with Tsuyu and this is one of the reasons she is disdainful of Mitsuya. She was attracted to Yukari's pain, and often stayed with her aunt. They broke up because it was too easy to be together, and that made things painful. She eventually befriends Ageha, despite her shyness.

Ran Kashiwagi

Yukari's mother who left V.B.R. when Yukari was five. She's very careless and free-spirited and when she was younger, she was very forgetful. Unfortunately, her forgetfulness cause her divorce to Aoi, Yukari's father, when she told Yukari that she would be right back and left him to almost freeze to death in the snow. Her first true encounter in the story is in Volume 10, where she offers Yukari a new car as a birthday gift. He refuses it, and she then offers to buy newer furniture for VB Rose. She finds it humorous that Ririko had not grown in over eighteen years. She mistook Sakura for a little Yukari and Yukari himself for Aoi. After learning of Ageha's relationship with Yukari, she drags her away on a shopping spree and buys her many clothes, shipping them to her house. She is truly forgetful and ditzy, while her actress persona was more sophisticated and wise. When two girls ask if she is the famous Ran, she pretends to be an airhead and asks if she really looks like her. She then asks Ageha how to make Yukari happy. She tells of how she hated going to her home and would often stay with her grandmother or with a friend. When she was sixteen, she met the nineteen-year-old Aoi who worked at VB Rose. Over time, they fell in love and eventually gave birth to Yukari. She explains that, being so young, she knew she was absent minded but deeply regrets leaving Yukari out in the snow and wants him to forgive her. Later, she returns to V.B.R. and Ageha encourages her to make up with her son. Fortunately, Yukari, being so indifferent to his mother's forgetful nature, forgives her and finally calls her "mother".

Aoi Arisaka

Yukari's father, who first created the shop Velvet Blue Rose. Yukari explains to Ageha that his father told him that he name the shop for the "blue of possibility" in the hopes that it would tell customers that the employees were willing to achieve the impossible. When he was 21 years old, he met Yukari's mother, 18-year-old Ran Kahiwagi, and they married and had Yukari. Then Aoi divorced Ran for being careless enough to risk their son's life. After that happened, some years later Aoi married Ririko and they had Sakura. Both Ran and Ririko were known for saying that they wanted to find features like theirs in their babies' faces because both Sakura and Yukari look so much like their father. Two years after Sakura's birth, Aoi died of an illness and the shop was left to Yukari to manage. He is alluded to many times throughout the series.

Ririko Arisaka

Sakura's mother and Yukari's step mother. She is thought more of as an older sister because of her loud and excited manner. She also laughs a lot and likes to pick on Yukari about his girlish looks by calling him a "sister" or a "daughter" although sometimes she may cry because his appearance reminds her so much of her dead husband Aoi. Her parents own a flower shop and she had known Yukari and Aoi since she was a small child. She is only six years older than Yukari, though. She is also pursued most of the time by Kyouichi Sekiguchi, who is the heir to the marriage hall that Ageha's sister got married in. He calls her "Lily" and is prone to doing what she tells him to because of his love for her. She doesn't have kind feelings toward Ran because she felt that Ran was a liar as a mother and never kept her promises to Yukari. She was also the one who found Yukari when he almost froze to death 18 years earlier. She's one of the clercks in Rosa Bridal shop.

Maki and Kazuha Sugimoto

They were the former main characters of one of Banri Hidaka's earlier works. They married when Kazuha was nineteen and were married for eight years. Maki first appears in the story as Hibari's wedding makeup artist, and fixes Ageha to look more proper at the wedding. They appear later in Sekiguchi's wedding villa, where he fixes model's hair and Kazuha helps him. They give birth to a young daughter named Hina at the same time as Hibari. In a side bar, it is stated that Kazuha refuses to call her husband by his first name and as 'Sugimoto' forever. Rei Akiyoshi bears a striking resemblance to his sister.

Rei Akiyoshi

Another recurring character from an earlier series. He is Kazuha Sugimoto's younger brother, now in high school, and the two look exactly alike. He is now cocky and self confident, friends with Mamoru Sakashita and Shizuya Kuromine. He realizes that Shizuya likes Mamoru and believes that Yukari is Ageha's boyfriend. He believes that he would look hot in a mini skirt.

Shizuya Kuromine

Mitsuya's younger brother. He despises Yukari because he believes he is the reason as to why Mitsuya dropped out of college and started to make wedding dresses. He eventually reconciles with his brother. Ageha uses his brother complex as a trump card in an argument. He has a friendly rivalry with Ageha and has a crush on Mamoru. He is friends with Rei. He later gives Mitsuya Mamoru's address so that Yukari could find Ageha.

Madoka Ohara

Matoko and Hibari's young daughter. She was an easy birth and Ageha makes her numerous handmade toys. She is very cute, and Hibari fears that she will stalk her daughter once she goes to school, as she was also possessive with a toddler Ageha. Matoko wants to raise her to say, "I love you, daddy".

Hina Sugimoto

Maki and Kazuha's young daughter, born around the same time as Madoka. Her hair is the same black hair as her mother. Her eyes are the same blue eyes as her father

Sakura Arisaka

Yukari's younger half brother and Ririko's son. His father is Aoi, who married Ririko before he died. He bears a striking resemblance to Yukari due to their strong DNA. Ageha Shiroi mistakes him for a younger Yukari. He has also shown signs of possibly being a womanizer, in which Yukari worries for his future. He seems to show a liking to Ageha and is developing his mother's smart mouth.

== Volumes ==
No.	Original release date	Original ISBN	North America release date	North America ISBN
01	August 19, 2004	978-4-592-18161-3	January 8, 2008	978-1-4278-0330-6
02	December 16, 2004	978-4-592-18162-0	May 13, 2008	978-1-4278-0331-3
03	April 19, 2005	978-4-592-18163-7	August 12, 2008	978-1-4278-0332-0
04	July 19, 2005	978-4-592-18164-4	October 14, 2008	978-1-4278-0333-7
05	November 18, 2005	978-4-592-18165-1	January 8, 2009	978-1-4278-0334-4
06	March 17, 2006	978-4-592-18166-8	September 29, 2009	978-1-4278-0335-1
07	July 19, 2006	978-4-592-18167-5	December 29, 2009	978-1-4278-0336-8
08	December 19, 2006	978-4-592-18168-2	March 27, 2010	978-1-4278-0709-0
09	April 19, 2007	978-4-592-18169-9	August 3, 2010	978-1-4278-0927-8
10	August 17, 2007	978-4-592-18170-5	November 2, 2010	978-1-4278-1160-8
11	January 18, 2008	978-4-592-18171-2	December 28, 2010	978-1-4278-1289-6
12	June 19, 2008	978-4-592-18172-9	April 12, 2011	978-1-4278-1587-3
13	January 19, 2009	978-4-592-18173-6	July 12, 2011	978-1-4278-1825-6
14	May 19, 2009	978-4-592-18174-3	October 11, 2011	—

== Reception ==
Mania.com's Nadia Oxford criticizes the manga for its cliches but commends the manga for its "cheek-pinchingly cute" protagonist. Coolstreak Cartoons's Leroy Douresseaux commends the manga's art as well as the "characters with gorgeous, stylized features".

The ninth volume of V.B.Rose was ranked 5th on the Tohan charts between April 18 and 24, 2007. The eleventh volume of V.B.Rose was ranked 8th twice on the Tohan charts between January 15 and 28, 2008, The twelfth volume of V.B.Rose was ranked 8th on the Tohan charts between June 17 and 23, 2008. The thirteenth volume of V.B.Rose was ranked 2nd on the Tohan charts between January 20 and 26, 2009. The fourteenth volume of V.B.Rose was ranked 2nd on the Tohan charts between May 18 and 24, 2009.
