= Venus Capriccio =

Japanese manga series

- Cover of Venus Capriccio volume 1 as published by CMX, showing Takami Habara and Akira Sasaki

ヴィーナス綺想曲 (Bīnasu Cappuricio)
- Genre: Romance, School Life
- Manga
- Written by: Mai Nishikata
- Published by: Hakusensha
- English publisher: NA: CMX
- Magazine: Hana to Yume
- Original run: 2006 – 2008
- Volumes: 5

Venus Capriccio (Japanese: ヴィーナス綺想曲, Hepburn: Vīnasu Kapurichio) is a Japanese manga series written and illustrated by Mai Nishikata about a tomboyish girl and her childhood friend who take piano lessons together. It was first serialized in the Japanese semi-monthly shōjo manga magazine Hana to Yume published by Hakusensha.

It is licensed in North America by CMX Manga.

== Plot ==
Venus Capriccio is about Takami and Akira who are childhood friends who attends the same piano classes. Compared to the rough and boyish Takami, Akira is more feminine and cute and is also more skilled in piano. Takami also thinks of Akira as a younger sister, but one day Akira suddenly kisses Takami, and says he likes her...?!

== Characters ==
=== Main characters ===
Takami Habara (Habara Takami)

Takami is a 17-year-old high schooler. She was brought up in a family of four brothers, causing her to become somewhat boyish. At 10 years old, she was forced to take piano lessons by her mother in order to keep her masculine personality at bay. She didn't like lessons at first because she felt embarrassed by the fact she didn't know how to play.

It wasn't until after she met Akira that she saw that playing the piano could be fun. She didn't realize that Akira had feelings for her, and even viewed him as a younger sister... until he kissed her.

Akira Sasaki (Sasaki Akira)

Takami met Akira at a piano lesson. Though he is two years younger, 3rd year in middle school as well as a talented pianist. He has numerous first-place trophies from piano competitions. In addition, he just has to hear a song in order to play it.

He has bright blue eyes, striking blond hair and an effeminate personality. Because of this, Takami has always thought of him as a little sister; a big problem considering the fact that he likes her. Akira routinely plays the piano for Takami. Sometimes, he does it to cheer her up; other times, he plays her favorite songs from the radio.

=== Supporting characters ===
Julian Clement (Clement Julian)
Sayuki Ooishi (Ooishi Sayuki)
Shinobu Oda (織田忍, Oda Shinobu)
Shuu Habara (Habara Shuu)

== Media ==
=== Manga ===
The manga is written and illustrated by Mai Nishikata, and published by Hakusensha in the Japanese semi-monthly shōjo manga magazine, Hana to Yume between 2006 and 2008. The 29 chapters have been collected in five tankōbon volumes.

In English, Venus Capriccio is licensed by CMX who published the first volume in 2009. With the imprint's impending shutdown, CMX will only publish up to the fourth volume of the series. The fate of the fifth and final volume is unknown.

No.	Original release date	Original ISBN	English release date	English ISBN
1	November 17, 2006	978-4-592-18855-1	April 28, 2009	978-1-4012-2061-7
Phase 1 – 5
2	June 19, 2007	978-4-592-18863-6	August 19, 2009	978-1-4012-2062-4
Phase 6 – 11
3	December 18, 2007	978-4-592-18864-3	January 26, 2010	—
Phase 12 – 17
4	May 19, 2008	978-4-592-18865-0	June 29, 2010	—
Phase 18 – 23
5	September 19, 2008	978-4-592-18730-1	N/A	—
Phase 23 – 29
