= Jiu Jiu =

Japanese manga series

- Cover of the first manga volume

JIUJIU -獣従-
- Genre: Dark fantasy; Romance; Supernatural
- Manga
- Written by: Touya Tobina
- Published by: Hakusensha
- English publisher: NA: Viz Media
- Magazine: Hana to Yume; The Hana to Yume
- Original run: December 2009 – July 2013
- Volumes: 5

Jiu Jiu (JIUJIU -獣従-; lit. "Beast Servants") is a Japanese manga series written and illustrated by Touya Tobina which first began in December 2009. The series follows Takamichi Hachioji, a girl from a family of hunters who track down and kill demons, and her two "Jiu Jiu", a pair of shapeshifting wolves named Snow and Night who work with her.

== Plot ==
Takamichi Hachioji, is a sixteen (later seventeen) year old girl who comes from a family of "Dark Hunters", whose job it is to hunt down demons and slay them. Three years earlier her twin brother was killed while working. On December 26 of that year she was given a pair of Jiu Jiu: half-human, half-animal hunting partners, to help her. At first reluctant, she then accepts them and raises the two, calling them Snow[Setsu] (a white wolf who wears Campaign for Nuclear Disarmament-logo earrings) and Night[Yuugure] (a black wolf who wears glasses in his human form). Snow and Night live via a code obeyed by all the Jiu Jiu: "Never reveal your true identity", "Never kill a human", "Never go out during a full moon" and "Always obey your Mistress". Breaking any of the rules is punishable by death.

In the present day, Snow and Night have grown at their usual wolf rate, meaning that in their human form, they now look like teenagers at the same age as Takamichi, despite being three years old. While always wishing to obey and be around their mistress, Takamichi finds them at times annoying because they are so protective. They always want to sleep in the same bed as her, and later manage to end up in the same school as her, attending in their human forms. Takamichi has to end up trying to keep them happy, while also coping with her work and her school studies.

== Reception ==
Rebecca Silverman of Anime News Network gave the first volume a C and the fourth and fifth volumes a D.

Ian Wolf for Anime UK News gave the first volume a rating of 8 out of 10 saying: "The best way to describe the storyline would be "tender with moments of tension". Most of the time it is all nice and gentle and Snow (Setsu) and Night (Yuugure) try and win Takamichi's love and praise, albeit not entirely successfully. However, then the trio has to end up going out and fighting ghouls and werewolves. There is nothing too violent, however.
