= Hana to Akuma =

Japanese manga series

- Cover of the first volume of Hana to Akuma, as published by Hakusensha

花と悪魔
- Genre: Comedy, Mystery, Romance, Supernatural
- Manga
- Written by: Hisamu Oto
- Published by: Hakusensha
- Magazine: Hana to Yume
- Original run: October 20, 2007 – March 18, 2011
- Volumes: 10

Hana to Akuma (花と悪魔; lit. "Hana and the Demon") is a Japanese manga series by Hisamu Oto. It was serialized in the shōjo manga magazine Hana to Yume, which is published by Hakusensha.

== Plot ==
Fifteen years ago, Vivi, a demon, left the demon realm for the human world. One year after arriving, he found an abandoned baby and chose to raise it. Since then, he has lived with Hana, though cohabiting with a fourteen-year-old girl presented challenges.

== Characters ==
Hana (はな)
Hana is the main heroine in the story. She was as an infant, found by Vivi during the second winter of his trip to the human world and has since then grown to the age of 14. She got her name because, according to Vivi's servants (including Toni), she has a "smile like a flower" (Hana is Japanese for flower).
Hana greatly admires Vivi and often brings him flowers, although they wilt as soon as he touches them because he is a demon. She has a fear of thunder, which causes her to have a habit of hiding under Vivi's bed. Hana is very naive, which often causes Vivi to get mad at her. It often seems like she is not listening to people, but she actually hears and answers back just in the moment they get irritated with her.
Hana wants Vivi to drink her blood but he refuses. She is jealous of Ayame because Vivi "accepts" Ayame's blood.
In chapter 29, she realizes that she's in love with Vivi. But due to Ranko (Moritz in disguise) who took her "heart", which caused her memories of what had just happened to be erased, Hana no longer remembers her feelings for Vivi.
She later remembers her feelings for him after he shows her the cherry blossoms but she doesn't remember the fact that she confessed to him.
Three years later after Vivi finished plugging up the holes in the demon world (due to Lucifer's powers weakening), she was able to enter the mansion unlike the previous years she tried. Vivi and Hana declared their love later on (despite Hana's constant rejection to his kisses due to the fact that she thinks that he will disappear upon doing so, as when they last kissed, Vivi had taken the necklace he had given her to "never forget him" ). He eventually proposes to her and she accepts. They were married in the last chapter and they had two children together, Yamabuki and Anzu, who, as a result of being half-humans, had the ability to touch flowers and not wilt them. Hana continued aging and died in her bed with Vivi holding her hand, thanking him for making her the happiest person in the world.
Vivi (ビビ, Bibi)
Vivi is a 200-year-old demon who came to the human world. He found Hana during his second winter in the human world. He is related to Lucifer, the king of the demon world. He cares deeply for Hana, though he does not realize that the buzzing feeling he gets, especially when Hana turns into Nigou is love. While he does not try to hide his affection for Hana, he can not admit that his feelings for her are romantic, which becomes a frequent conflict in their relationship throughout the series.
In the demon world, Vivi's rank is 'duke' (Claus explains the ranks of demons to Hana in chapter 4). He is childhood friends with Felten, Eleanor, and Klaus. After he noticed the fact that Momo has a crush on Hana, he starts a childish fight with the latter. Though he appears to be indifferent, Vivi actually cares for Hana and wishes to protect her. He is even afraid at the thought of losing her.
He hates getting up in morning. He would rather sleep until the afternoon. However, he usually gets up earlier since Hana comes to wake him up with a flower every morning.
Vivi is the only one to have a title at age 10, although he doesn't care for the achievement (so little as to getting annoyed whenever someone mentions and/or attempts to force him to return to the demon world to take the place of the current demon king, Lucifer). One day, he got bored and came to earth with Toni along with some maids.
Vivi hates and fears cats due to a childhood trauma. As a child, he would always skip classes. Therefore, one day a teacher got mad at him that she tied him up and threw him into a dark cellar with hundreds of cats. They bit him very often. Even though the wounds healed quickly, his terror of cats remained.
He leaves Hana behind and goes to the demon world, because it's an order from the demon king, promising to come back for her after 3 years although in truth he had planned to completely forget Hana so as to enable her to lead a normal life. 3 years and 3 months later, he tries to submerge himself in work so as to forget Hana, but with constant persuasion from (especially) Eleanor and Velten, plus with a new order from the new demon king, Moritz, that he must go back to Hana, Vivi finally does so. In order to make her happy, he goes back to the human world where Hana is waiting for him. After reconciling from the misunderstanding over the nature of their relationship, they confess their love to each other and he proposes to her, which she accepts. They get married after a year in the last chapter and have two children together, Yamabuki and Anzu. When Hana dies, he holds her hand and wonders if they chose the right path. However, he also says that being with her all those years had made him the happiest person in the world.
Velten (フェルテン, Feruten)
Velten (also called Felten) is a demon and has been friends with Vivi since they were kids. He cheers up Hana whenever Vivi gets mad at her. He has convinced Vivi that touching Hana won't kill her (in the same way that a flower wilts at a demon's touch).
He has a fiancée named Eleanor whom he refuses to marry due to fear of commitment, and a fondness for all females(also because of a fear that he would taint her). Since Felten is the reason Vivi is willing to touch Hana, Hana is willing to act as his girlfriend when he wanted to chase Eleanor away by turning her into Nigou (an older version of herself) with the use of a potion.
After Eleanor finds out the truth, she moves in with Felten, though they stay unmarried for a while. In a bonus chapter, it is revealed that they have a wedding but the wedding is not shown. Velten is a baron, being demoted from Count for flirting with daughters of the Elders. He is very cheerful and it annoys Vivi because of that.
He is the only one of the demons who has no problem with the sun. The others, especially Vivi, think it's too bright.
Ayame Nijyō (二条菖蒲, Nijyō Ayame)
Ayame, a widow who was married to a government official, is the person who gives her blood to Vivi since she owes him. She has romantic feelings for Vivi though they are unrequited. Hana often gets jealous when she sees Vivi sucking Ayame's blood, wishing instead for him to suck hers. Chapter 27 reveals how Vivi and Ayame met.
She convinced herself that she fell in love with him because of the way he smiled at Hana. She accepts the fact that she can't compete with Hana. In the same chapter their past is revealed, Vivi told Ayame that he was through with sucking her blood.
She is always wearing a kimono.
Momo Tanizaki (谷崎桃, Tanizaki Momo)
Momo is the son of florists who live in town who is in the same grade as Hana. Momo first meets Hana and tricks her into buying less flowers than she actually paid for, but his conscious takes over and he tries to save her when she dives into the river, but Vivi gets to her first.
Momo gives her the flowers she paid for, and more later, and he and Hana become friends. He does not like Vivi, and finds out the secret of the latter and the others being demons later in the manga. He has a crush on Hana, the main cause of Vivi's hostility (later uncovered by Eleanor and Velten to be jealousy) towards him. He has accidentally been kissed by Hana while she was trying to hug him, but her foot slipped and she fell down.
Momo's name means peach blossom, a name he is embarrassed of since it is a girl's name, and is frequently called "Momo-chan" by his friends, mostly Hana.
Eleanor (エリノア, Erinoa)
Eleanor is Felten's fiancée and has been in love with him since they were children. She wants to marry him, but since he's a womanizer he refuses to do so. She gets angry very easily. After she discovers that Hana is not Felten's girlfriend, she came to like her. She is Klaus' twin sister.
Klaus (クラウス, Kurausu)
Klaus is Eleanor's twin. He constantly tries to help the Elders from the demon world trick Vivi to come back to the demon world. He deeply resents Vivi because, as children, whenever he did anything special, Vivi was always a few steps ahead of him. He is a baron like Velten.
Rosemary (ローゼマリー, Rōzemarī)
Rosemary is Vivi's fiancée. She wants to marry him because of his higher status, although it is hinted she might have desired his attention when they were younger.
Lucifer (ルシフェル, Rushiferu)
Lucifer is the former king of the demon world. He loves to annoy and test Vivi all the time. He is related to Vivi but it is unknown to which status they are related. He's much older than Vivi and the others and he changes his appearance so much that he doesn't know what he looked like ages ago. It is implied throughout the series that Lucifer may have romantic feelings for Hana.
Lucifer's greeting for Vivi is usually to stab him with a sword. He has two black stars under his left eye. Vivi calls him "Old Geezer!".
Toni (トーニ)
Toni is Vivi 's butler. He takes care of almost everything around the mansion. He and his grandfather (who was also a butler) are the only butlers who ever dared to lecture Vivi. He's a very kind person and adores Hana. He and Vivi have been together since they were ten years old. He takes care of the roses in the flower garden.
Gilbert
Gilbert is Lucifer's butler. He is typically an extremely calm person, despite often being annoyed by the demon king because he only cares about how to annoy Vivi. He wants Lucifer to fulfil his duties as the king properly.
Ranko/Moritz
Ranko is a girl in Hana's class after she enters school in chapter 28. She is her first human female friend. She tells Hana, that she had a crush on Vivi, who had become a math teacher, but actually she just wants permission to pass the spell that Vivi cast to protect the mansion. The reason is that Ranko is actually a manly demon named Moritz, who is also a duke like Vivi and wants to be the next demon king. He tries to break Vivi's heart by casting a spell on Hana so she is mean and arrogant and in love with him instead of Vivi. At the end of the manga series, it is revealed Moritz had taken the place of Lucifer as the demon King.
Michel
Michel is a demon, also known as the cat-user, because he studies a lot about cats and his mansion is a cat paradise. His spells are almost all about cats. He helps Klaus from time to time. Michel sent Mr. Cat to slowly take Hana's life energy, so that Vivi would go back to demon world. He has cat ears. He is the reason why Momo finds out about their true identity.
Yamabuki and Anzu
They are the son and daughter of Hana and Vivi. Both Anzu and Yamabuki look like high-schoolers despite that Yamabuki is already 73 years old and Anzu is 70 years old in the final chapter, being half-demons. Both are very demon-like in nature but have the gift of not causing flowers to wilt when touched. Hana likely gave birth to Yamabuki a year after the wedding, which might be possible because she said that she wanted to have Vivi's children as soon as possible when they married.
Mr. Cat
Mr. Cat is a black cat from demon world, who was sent to get Hana's life energy so she would die and cause Vivi to come back to the demon world. After they lift the spell, he is normal black cat that lives in the mansion. Vivi originally wanted to "get rid of" Mr. Cat due to his fear of cats.
Mr. Bird
Mr. Bird is a black bird Vivi created from his shadow once, because he wanted to go to Ayame's place while Hana wanted to watch a special moon with him. He told her to wait for him, but she said she would be lonely. After that, he wanted to erase it, but Hana begged him not to do so and in the end he relented.

== Media ==
=== Manga ===
Hana to Akuma was written and illustrated by Hisamu Oto. It was first serialized in Hakusensha's shōjo manga magazine Hana to Yume from October 20, 2007. There are ten volumes published in Japan.

The series is licensed in Hong Kong by Comics World, in Taiwan by Tong Li Publishing and in France by Marvel Panini.

No.	Release date	ISBN
1	February 19, 2008	978-4-592-18551-2
Chapter 1 - 5
2	August 19, 2008	978-4-592-18552-9
Chapter 6 - 11
3	December 19, 2008	978-4-592-18553-6
Chapter 12 - 17
4	April 17, 2009	978-4-592-18554-3
Chapter 18 - 23
5	July 17, 2009	978-4-592-18555-0
Chapters 24 - 29
6	November 19, 2009	978-4-592-18556-7
Chapters 30 - 35
7	April 19, 2010	978-4-592-18557-4
8	August 19, 2010	978-4-592-18558-1
9	December 17, 2010	978-4-592-18559-8
10	March 18, 2011	978-4-592-18500-0
