= Satisfaction Guaranteed (manga) =

Manga series written and illustrated by Ryo Saenagi

- Tokyopop's first volume of Satisfaction Guaranteed

よろず屋東海道本舗 (Yorozuya Tōkaidō Honpo)
- Genre: Comedy, Drama
- Manga
- Written by: Ryo Saenagi
- Published by: Hakusensha
- English publisher: NA: Tokyopop
- Magazine: Hana to Yume
- Original run: 1999 – 2002
- Volumes: 9

Satisfaction Guaranteed (Japanese: よろず屋東海道本舗, Hepburn: Yorozuya Tōkaidō Honpo) is a Japanese manga series written and illustrated by Ryo Saenagi (冴凪亮, Saenagi Ryō).

== Plot ==
Shima Yoshitsune and Suruga Kaori are "Anything Inc.", an all-purpose person company. They rely on each other greatly: Kaori depending on Shima because he is afraid that his other personality, Kyo, will eventually take over, and Shima on Kaori, because Kaori's smile reminds him of his father's. Shima and Kaori first meet in Volume 1 when they were trying to track down Kaori's stalker. In this case Shima had to cross-dress as a girl so they could find and stop Kaori's stalker, also known as "Mr. Snowman."

== Characters ==
Shima Yoshitsune
An 18-year-old "midget", the boss of Anything Inc. His parents died two years ago in a fire caused by an arsonist. To this day, he is terrified of fire, nearly fainting at the sight of smoke. He seems to be very talented at cross dressing as a girl. Shima has come to rely on Kaori more and more as the series progresses, to the point that Kaori can help calm Shima down when he's having a panic attack.

Suruga Kaori
A 16-year-old model and Shima's best friend. They work well together, and Kaori depends a lot on Shima. When around Shima, his other personality, Kyo, doesn't get out as much. He created Kyo to get away from the pressures of the modeling world, but he is afraid that Kyo will eventually take over completely and Kaori will no longer exist. He is said to be the most handsome member of the cast. He has a good relationship with Shima. He seems to believe that he cannot show weakness and is always smiling and not letting other people know if he's tired or sick or the like. He is a strong stabilizing force for Shima, him in balance when he gets too riled up or has a panic attack.

Kyo
Kaori's alter personality. Kyo is a cold, ruthless person who doesn't seem to take other people into consideration. He told Shima that Kaori is his everything, and he would do anything to protect Kaori, no matter who else gets hurt. In volume 7, it is revealed that Kyo has knowledge of the man who burned Shima's house down and killed his parents, though Kaori is unaware of this.

App
His name stands for "All Purpose Person" and Shima considers him to be his rival. He, like Kaori, has a dual personality, Hyuga Shuhei. Shuhei is only App when he has his wig on. He is engaged to Hotori, the girl who asked for Anything Inc.'s help in chapter 3. It has been noted that Kaori and App look similar. In later chapters, he begins to have a larger presence. He helps Kaori out several times, and he meets Kyo, though he doesn't understand why Kyo exists. He offered his services to Kaori once, when Kaori helped save App, but in volume 7 remarks that Kaori "was never going to take him up on that offer", because he prefers to do everything on his own.

Mai
A school girl who shows up in volume 4, chapter 'Avenging Angels'. Otherwise known as 'Repo-girl' Mai, like App and Shima, is the boss of another 'anything agency' and specializes in beating up bad boyfriends. She gets paid with homework. She mentions that she knows Kaori from somewhere, but they can't remember the meeting. In volume 7, Mai remembers where she saw Kaori before. Two years ago, in front of a burning house, Mai remembers seeing a beautiful young person watching the house burn. She thought the person was a girl. When she saw some pictures of Kaori's earlier modeling days, she realized that Kaori was who she saw outside Shima's house.

Shizuka
Kaori's sister. She is married, and she owns a theme park that Kaori and Shima go to twice. The first time, they go to help solve a mystery of sabotage. The second time they go because Shizuka invited them to try out her newest attraction. Shizuka appears to know why Kaori created Kyo in the first place and was the one who told Shima that Kaori had Kyo long before he started modeling. She does not tell Shima any more than that, preferring to let Kaori tell Shima on his own.

Chikuzen Yoichi
A cop on the police force. He used to be Shima-san (Yoshitsune's father)'s partner before Shima-san died. Now he works on his own cases, and he wants to find the arsonist. In volume 6, chapter "Crossroads", it showed that Shima-san could look past Yoichi's tough-guy delinquent exterior and treat him like a regular good guy. Yoichi appeared to hold Shima-san on a bit of a pedestal and was devastated at his death. He helps Shima and Kaori out on their cases occasionally.

== Production ==
The "story" for Satisfaction Guaranteed came after Saenagi's editor requested that she create a series based on two boys; she imagined that there was a "dramatic height difference" between the two, with the shorter one being older. Saenagi named characters Shima Yoshitsune, Suruga Kaori, and Hyuga Shuhei after ancient regions in Japan; Hyuga is a Western Sea Land, while Shima and Suruga are both Eastern Sea Lands.

In reaction to responses that she drew "too many guys" in her series, Saenagi explained that read mostly shōnen works instead of shōjo while growing up, which affected the genders of characters. However, she did state that she "like[s] to draw girls", but feels that she "[isn't] good at it".

== Media ==
=== Manga ===
The first volume of Satisfaction Guaranteed was released by Tokyopop in the United States on July 11, 2006. Currently, the company has released 7 translated volumes.

==== Volume list ====
===== Volume 1 =====
- Ch. 1 Satisfaction Guaranteed
  - Yoshitsune Shima, founder of the ‘Anything Inc.’ business, is hired by Kaori Suruga, a top model, to investigate a stalker that is sending him creepy letters.
- Ch. 2 Haunted by the Past
  - Shima and Kaori go an Edo-period replicated town to investigate the rumors of a ghost sighting because Shima wants to find out if there is such a thing as ghosts.
- Ch. 3 Acting on Impulse
  - Shima gets two mysterious messages that invite him to the festival at Kaori's school to find out what the messages mean. Then, when Kaori is kidnapped, Shima is desperate to find him.
- Ch. 4 A Visitor on Christmas Eve
  - Anything Inc. is hired by Ms. Hotori to find out who is targeting her. However, halfway through the party, a mysterious person shows up. Is he just the competition, or are his motives more sinister?
- Ch. 5 The Cruelest Cut
  - Shima and Kaori are hired by Tanabe Haru, along with App, to figure out who is the Barber of Shiran High, a man who is going around cutting off girls’ hair. Things aren’t as easy as it seems, and Shima may have to dress in drag once more.

===== Volume 2 =====
- Ch. 6 Love Unleashed
  - Shima is hired by a girl to be her ‘companion’. However, when he finds himself chained up in an empty apartment, he realizes that something more might be going on. He enlists Kaori's help to find out her true motives.
- Ch. 7 Two Doors Unlocked
  - Shima is invited to a new theme park attraction called ‘Close’ to find the sender of some nasty threats the park has been receiving. The culprit is closer than it appears.
- Ch. 8 Mystery Boys
  - Shima and Kaori go to a resort owned by Misato, an old classmate of Shima's. A series of robberies have been happening throughout the resort town, and it's Shima and Kaori's job to figure out who's behind it before the culprits get to Misato's resort. Suspicion is cast on the strange actions of Ryuuzaki, who happens to be Shima's old friend and Misato's ex-boyfriend.

===== Volume 3 =====
- Ch. 9 Broken Memories
  - When Shima goes to visit Kaori during a photo shoot, they find that his dressing room has been trashed. Is the culprit Himura Shinku, a little boy whose cute personality disappears once the cameras stop rolling? Shima seems to think so. But there may be more to this case than it first appears...
- Ch. 10 Dead End
  - A manuscript of the latest App novel, Adios APP, has been stolen, and Anything Inc. is hired by the author's daughter to recover the manuscript. The duo find out that in the stolen manuscript, App is killed. Could Hyuga Shuhei, an avid fan and App impersonator, have snapped when he found out his hero was set to die?

===== Volume 4 =====
- Ch. 11 The Stormy Tower
  - When Shima rescues a young fortune teller named Ewan, Ewan offers a fortune reading in exchange. When the fortune turns out unlucky, Shima and Kaori, both placing little trust in fortunes, decide not to believe it. However, Shima's latest case turns out to be ... taking care of a baby?! Could his fortune really be coming true?
- Ch. 12 Avenging Angels
  - Hired to protect a jerky guy named Ota, Shima and Kaori suspect that Ota isn’t telling them something. When they find out that Ota has been targeted by a serial whacker, they figure Ota must have done something to get whacked. When Kaori gets whacked by mistake, it gets personal for Shima.

===== Volume 5 =====
- Ch. 13 Time off for Good Behavior
  - On Shima and Kaori's day off, they visit Tanabe-san's sweets shop, only to find App working there instead. Things aren’t sweet at all, though, when a robber busts in at closing time. But what's with his weapon? And he only wants $39? Something is going on, and Shima's gonna figure it out!
- Ch. 14 A Medicine for Melancholy
  - Sent by Yoichi, our lovely duo set out treasure hunting! Kikai, Yoichi's old acquaintance, gives a vague map and says ‘the circle marks the spot’. They aren’t the only ones in the game, though. Kikai's children and grandchildren want the treasure, too.
- Ch. 15 A Little White Lie
  - When Kaori is mistaken for the older brother of a little girl, he plays along and pretends to be her big brother. However, after a day at the park turns bad, Shima and Kaori find out this girl's true wish: Find her real big brother, please!
- Ch. 16 Everyone's Choices
  - Shizuka's friend's younger sister, Tezuka Saki, is worried. There have been a string of robberies around town. Saki saw someone come out of a recently robbed house who, from the back, looks like her boyfriend. To make matters worse, he's been skipping school and avoiding her questions. What is Saki's boyfriend really up to? And is Kaori as well as he seems?

===== Volume 6 =====
- Ch. 17 Level Control
  - It's back to Shizuka's park, this time in a new obstacle course game. Teams of five compete to get to the finish line. This team is a winner: Shima, Kaori, App, Mai, and ... who's their last member? And what are his motives? And when the game brings out a side of Kaori previously unknown, App gets his first glimpse of Kyo and realizes that everything might not be as peachy-keen with Kaori as everyone thinks.
- Ch. 18 Crossroad
  - Shima and Kaori are hired by Fuyuko Kasumi to investigate a series of creepy e-mails she's been receiving, as well as the feeling that she's being watched. In this chapter we get to learn a little about Yoichi and Shima-san (senior)’s past.
- Ch. 19 Trial And Error
  - Ewan’s sister (Ch. 11 The Stormy Tower) hires Anything Inc. to help take care of a trouble-making little kid. This boy’s story may be more than just mischievous pranks, though. Who does he want to notice?

===== Volume 7 =====
- Ch. 20 From the Ashes
  - Everyone gathers for a little party to celebrate Shizuka’s theme park’s appearance on TV. Turning on the TV, however, reveals a story about an arsonist that has been arrested, possibly the one that burned Shima’s house and killed his parents. Shima goes into a panic attack, only to find out that the guy they arrested isn’t the real killer. Someone else murdered his parents, and the one who might know is the only one Shima can’t talk to. Mai remembers where she saw Kaori before, and she confides in App. When Shima hears, though, misunderstandings occur and a rift is torn between them. Kyo is the only one who can clear everything up, but if it puts Kaori in danger, is he willing to risk it?

== Reception ==
Reviewing for Mania, Patricia Beard rated Satisfaction Guaranteed with a C+. Beard praised the artwork, writing that the "blending of shoujo sensibility and shounen energy" was "very appropriate for this series about a do-it-all agency run by two cute guys". However, she commented that it "lacks the polish and confidence of her later work" and was "not terribly clean". Overall, Beard felt that the stories are "weak" but that "there's enough entertainment in the interaction of Shima and Kaouri to make this series worth a read." Additional comments stated that "persistence will pay off" when reading the series because the art and stories improve with each volume.
