= Wild Ones (manga) =

Japanese manga series by Kiyo Fujiwara

- The cover of the first volume of Wild Ones

アラクレ (Arakure)
- Genre: Comedy, romance, adventure
- Manga
- Written by: Kiyo Fujiwara
- Published by: Hakusensha
- English publisher: NA: Viz Media
- Magazine: Hana to Yume
- Original run: 2004 – 2009
- Volumes: 10

Wild Ones (Japanese: アラクレ, Hepburn: Arakure) is a Japanese manga by Kiyo Fujiwara. It is finished with 10 volumes in Japan and is serialized in Hana to Yume. In December 2007 Viz began releasing the series under the name Wild Ones and under the Shojo Beat label in the US. A preview of the manga series was seen in the November 2007 issue of Shojo Beat.

== Story ==
After recently losing her mother, Sachie Wakamura is suddenly greeted by her maternal grandfather, whom she has never met, who offers to let her live with him. She soon discovers that her grandfather is a less than ordinary man: he is a head of a yakuza gang. To help her adjust to her new home, she is assigned a bodyguard, the handsome and protective Rakuto Igarashi. While struggling to keep all this hidden from her classmates, Sachie attempts to graduate from high school and lead a normal life.

== Main characters ==
=== Sachie Wakamura ===
Sachie is the 15-year-old (who later turns 16 in the earlier chapters) protagonist of the story. She has a strong sense of justice and dislikes deceit. Her stubborn nature makes Rakuto's job all the more challenging. Her father died a long time ago and with the recent death of her mother, Sachie finds she has nowhere to live until her grandfather appears and takes her in. She begins to adjust to having the head of a yakuza gang as her grandfather and living in a house full of hoodlums. It seems she has inherited yakuza blood; she can be very scary when she is mad. Her favorite food is hamburger with egg in it. Because of Rakuto, her classmates think she's a princess (she's a princess, but of yakuza). Everyone in the yakuza is very protective of Sachie, and are prepared to protect her with their life. Throughout the series, she's seen fighting the urge to fall in love with Rakuto, though unsuccessfully. Sachie has an 86% compatibility chance with Azuma. She and Rakuto have a 99% compatibility chance, but Rakuto is unaware. When a girl from another yakuza gang falls in love with Rakuto and has Rakuto as her caretaker for a while, (because Sachie caused Midori's original caretaker, Kotaro, to catch a cold) Sachie is shown to be annoyed at the fact that Rakuto didn't get mad at Midori like he does to Sachie.

=== Rakuto Igarashi ===
Rakuto is Sachie's bodyguard. Handsome and heroic, he is the most popular guy in school and is the student council president. No one at school suspects that he belongs to a yakuza gang, in part because he acts like a prince, and was considered one until he refers to Sachie as a "princess" and that he is her bodyguard in order to remove any suspicion that they are associated with yakuza. His father, Iga, had a serious gambling debt when Rakuto was little, and his mother left him. Afterwards, Asagi took him in. Rakuto is very loyal to Sachie, to the point of being over protective. He had met Sachie and her mother when she was 5 years old, and her smiling face attracted him. He already seemed to have feelings for her since then. It is also proven that he can be quite jealous, as when the new cute student Azuma asked Sachie to dance, he whisked her away before the dance began, on the story that she had sprained her leg. Later, when Sachie questions him about it, he asks her to dance with him alone. He and Azuma have a 100% compatibility chance. Rakuto and Sachie have a 99% compatibility chance, although only Sachie knows. At one point Rakuto has to be the caretaker of a girl from a different yakuza gang, and he was really grumpy when Sachie ignored him. It is believed that Rakuto, in middle school, was the leader of his school's gang.

=== Azuma Inui ===
Azuma's grandfather is a friend of Sachie's grandfather. Azuma moves into Raizo's house when his grandfather is in the hospital. Shortly after moving into Raizo's home, he transfers into the same school as Sachie and Rakuto. Like Rakuto, he is very popular with the girls at his school. Azuma has been shown to have feelings for Sachie, but his attempts have been failures. In chapter 6, Sachie and Rakuto are shown to have a 99% compatibility chance, and Azuma and Sachie have 86%. Azuma and Rakuto treat each other as rivals.

=== Raizo Asagi ===
Asagi is Sachie's grandfather, and the head of a yakuza gang. The kanji character for "Rai" in his name, Raizo, means thunder bolt in Japanese. He is a man of integrity and honor. Everyone in his gang is devoted to him, since many people who he has taken in are those who have nowhere else to go. His favorite food is hamburger with egg in it. He keeps his daughter Yukie's room untouched, and punishes whoever goes in it severely. When his daughter decided to leave his home, he told her that she would no longer be an Asagi, and would be dead to him. When he heard his daughter was dead and left a granddaughter, he decided to take her in. One of his hand is missing a pinky. (Yubitsume refers to finger-cutting. Among the yakuza, the cutting of one's pinky serves as form of penance or apology)

=== Yukie Wakamura ===
Deceased mother of Sachie and daughter of Asagi. She left her father's home and thus broke all ties with him and the name Asagi. Even when she had Sachie, she did not contact Asagi, but told Sachie all her family was dead. Yukie hated all things deceitful. She hated to waste food which she told Sachie never to do. She was strong, kind, and full of love. Her specialty was cooking hamburgers with egg in it. Her room in Asagi's house remains untouched since the day she left. Yukie seems to have been killed by being hit by a car. Like Sachie, she had a bodyguard named Jin Aso who appears to have had feelings for her and had kidnapped Sachie in order to see if Rakuto was a capable bodyguard.
