= Hisaya Nakajo =

Japanese manga artist (1973–2023)

Hisaya Nakajo 中条 比紗也
- Born: 12 September 1973 Osaka Prefecture, Japan
- Died: 12 October 2023 (aged 50) Japan
- Areas: Character designer, writer, manga artist
- Pseudonyms: Ryou Fumizuki; Peco Fujiya
- Notable works: Hana-Kimi; Sugar Princess

Hisaya Nakajo (中条 比紗也, Nakajō Hisaya; 12 September 1973 – 12 October 2023) was a Japanese shōjo manga artist. She also used the names Peco Fujiya (for yaoi works) and Ryou Fumizuki for doujinshi with her circle, Daisanteikoku.

== Biography ==
Nakajo made her professional debut by winning the Outstanding Work award in the 18th Hakusensha Athena Newcomers' Awards for her work, Manatsu no Hanzaisha (真夏の犯罪者; 'The Midsummer Criminal') that was later published in the extra issue of Hana to Yume, Hana to Yume Planet Zōkan 15 July issue. She published her first one-shot as a professional manga artist titled, Hāto no Kajitsu (ハートの果実; 'Heart no Kajitsu') in the 23rd issue of Hana to Yume in 1994. In a 1995 interview, when asked about the origin of her boyish pen name, she replied, "There's no particular origin. I was really into name divination when I debuted, so I just made it up with some wordplay." Her real name has not been publicly disclosed.

Nakajo came in 39th in the 2007 Most Searched Manga Artist Names by the Japanese search engine, goo.

Hisaya Nakajo died from heart disease on 12 October 2023, 8:52, at the age of 50.

== Works ==
=== One-shots ===
- Heart no Kajitsu
- Futari no Hōsoku
- 17 Romance
- Tasogare wa Sasayaku
- Tokeru Koe
- Natsu no Ran
- Kawaki no Tsuki
- Ō-sama Monogatari
- Wild Kiss

=== Sent-in works ===
- Manatsu no Hanzaisha

=== Short works ===
- Yumemiru Happa
- Usotsuki na Taiyō

=== Series ===
- Missing Piece
- Hana-Kimi
- Sugar Princess

=== Contributions ===
- Duel Love – Character design
