= Sugar Princess =

Japanese manga series

- Sugar Princess volume 2 as published by Hakusensha, featuring Shun Kanou (left) and Maya Kurinoki (right)

シュガープリンセス (Shugā Purisensu)
- Genre: Sports
- Manga
- Written by: Hisaya Nakajo
- Published by: Hakusensha
- English publisher: NA: Viz Media
- Imprint: Hana to Yume Comics
- Magazine: Hana to Yume
- Original run: February 5, 2005 – December 19, 2007
- Volumes: 2

Sugar Princess (Japanese: シュガープリンセス, Hepburn: Shugā Purisensu) also known as Sugar Princess: Skating to Win by the Viz Media translation is a Japanese shōjo manga series by Hisaya Nakajo. The series premiered in the 5th issue of Hana to Yume in 2005 and ended in the 2nd issue of 2007. The series was licensed in English by Viz Media.

== Plot ==
Maya's first ice skating experience leaves a lasting impression on a mysterious man, potentially opening doors to professional figure skating and a connection with the enigmatic skater, Shun.

== Characters ==
Maya Kurinoki (栗木 麻綾)
The heroine of the story. Maya is in her 3rd year of middle school. In the first chapter, she makes an impression on a skating coach when she imitates a double Axel, performing the jump perfectly besides a fall. She calls Shun "Kira-Kira Prince" when she first sees him because of the beautiful way he skates, but when he meets her, he's rather rude and cold towards her. He refuses to become her trainer. Maya starts developing feelings for Shun after a while, and when offered to be Shun's partner, she states she doesn't mind, as long as Shun is fine with it. She has 2 elder sisters (Ema and Maasa) and a younger brother (Ryuuta).
Shun Kanou (狩野 旬)
The lead male character. Shun is in his 2nd year of high school. He's a professional skater, and Maya's trainer and skating partner. At first, he refuses to be Maya's partner and trainer, but when they're both set up to save the rink, he becomes her "temporary" partner. He doesn't want to have a partner because he doesn't want to replace his previous partner, his late sister Aya.
Eiji Todou
The man who Maya makes an impression on. He scouts her at the local skating rink, and tries to make her and Shun skating partners. He has a niece who is seen in the first chapter.
Junye Kuze
A "prince". He's a professional skater who skates at another rink nearby, and Maya takes a liking to his ways of skating. She visits his rink and skates with him, to Shun's annoyance.
Reina Komori
A professional skater. She's in love with Shun, and wants to be his new skating partner. When Maya starts getting a bit too close to him, she tells her off, comparing her to his late sister.
Hikaru Kiriya
Attends the same ice rink Shun and Maya does. He's in 6th grade, and close friends with both Maya and Shun.
Nanako and Chie
Maya's best friends. They first mistake Todou for a pervert and accompany her to the ice rink.
Oda
Shun's best friend from school. He's taken a friendly interest in Maya and notices the change in Shun since he became Maya's trainer.

== Media ==
=== Manga ===
No.	Original release date	Original ISBN	English release date	English ISBN
1	October 19, 2005	978-4-592-18341-9	August 5, 2008	978-1-4215-1930-2
2	March 19, 2007	978-4-592-18342-6	November 4, 2008	978-1-4215-1931-9
