= List of Maid Sama! episodes =

The cover of the first Blu-ray compilation of the anime Kaichō wa Maid-sama!, released by Geneon Universal Entertainment; featuring the main characters Misaki Ayuzawa (left) and Takumi Usui (right).

Maid Sama! is an anime series adapted from the manga of the same title by Hiro Fujiwara. Produced by J.C.Staff and directed by Hiroaki Sakurai, Maid Sama! follows the relationship and romance between Misaki Ayuzawa, the female student council president of Seika High School, an all-boys turned co-ed school though still male-dominated, and Takumi Usui, the mysterious and the most popular boy at Seika High School, who knows that Misaki secretly works part-time at a maid café to support her family.

The anime ran in Japan from April 1 to September 23, 2010, on the Tokyo Broadcasting System and was later simulcast three days later after the Japanese airing in Asia from April 4 to September 26, 2010, on Animax Asia with English subtitles. In North America, The Anime Network started streaming the series via their online player on June 15, and distributed it via Video On Demand on August 5, 2010. The series is licensed in the North America by Sentai Filmworks (now owned by AMC Networks). Animax Asia's English adaptation aired in Southeast Asia from November 25, 2010, to December 30, 2010.

The opening theme, titled "My Secret" is performed by Saaya Mizuno; it was released on May 26, 2010, in normal and special editions, and peak ranked 37th on Oricon singles charts. The first ending theme is "Yokan" (予感) performed by the rock band Heidi.; the single was released on May 26, 2010, in normal and special editions, and peak ranked 32nd in Oricon singles charts. The second ending theme, used from episode 16 onwards is "∞Loop" (∞ ループ) also performed by Heidi; the single was released on August 25, 2010, in normal and special editions, and peak ranked 48th in Oricon singles charts.

== Episode list ==
| No. | Title | Original release date |
|---|---|---|
| 1 | "Misa is a Maid-Sama!"; Transliteration: "Misaki-chan wa Meido-sama!" (Japanese: 美咲ちゃんはメイド様!) | April 1, 2010 |
Misaki Ayuzawa, the first female student council president of the previously all-boys Seika High School, is highly respected by the female students but feared and loathed by the male students. She secretly works part-time at a maid café called Maid Latte to support her sister Suzuna Ayuzawa and mother Minako Ayuzawa, seeing as her father Sakuya Ayuzawa left them with tremendous debt. A popular male student named Takumi Usui discovers Misaki there, and she fears that her secret will be exposed at school. However, Usui keeps her secret after listening to her reasons for her part-time job, though later choosing to annoy her by becoming a regular customer. When Misaki becomes sick due to stress and fatigue, Usui advises Misaki to loosen up, but she rejects his advice. At work, Misaki is discovered by Naoya Shirakawa, Ikuto Sarashina and Ryuunosuke Kurosaki, three male students referred to as the "Idiot Trio". They harass her until Usui shows up to intervene. Misaki apologizes to Usui before fainting. After Misaki recovers, Usui tells Misaki that he asked the Idiot Trio to keep her secret, then he teases her about becoming his personal maid for a day as his reward.
| 2 | "Maid-Sama at the School Festival"; Transliteration: "Gakuensai demo Meido-sama!" (Japanese: 学園祭でもメイド様!) | April 8, 2010 |
With the annual school festival coming up, Misaki uses this opportunity to improve the school's image by encouraging more girls to enroll. However, problems arise with class 2-2 because the activities proposed by the boys are attempts to exploit the girls. Misaki ultimately decides that class 2-2 will host a coffee shop as suggested by three female classmates. Misaki acts hostile only towards the male classmates during their preparations, and Usui warns her after work that her hostility will eventually backfire. On the day of the school festival, there is a huge turnout of female visitors. Unfortunately, Misaki finds her male classmates are cosplayed in various military outfits. She scolds the boys, but they end up leaving the female classmates to run the coffee shop alone. As Misaki serves multiple patrons at once, she accidentally calls one of them "master". Usui covers for her by acting as a butler. Having seen the action through the classroom door, the boys return and serve the patrons properly. During the school festival after-party, Usui finds Misaki resting under a tree, where she thanks him for his assistance. Usui then continues to tease Misaki about being his personal maid.
| 3 | "What Color is Misaki? Natural Color?"; Transliteration: "Misaki wa Nani Iro? Tennen Shoku?" (Japanese: 美咲は何色?天然色?) | April 15, 2010 |
Maid Latte plans to host a "Little Sister Day", where the maids role-play as little sisters to their customers, but Misaki struggles to fit the personality with no prior experience. Although coworker Honoka accuses Misaki of not taking it seriously, manager Satsuki Hyoudou suggests Misaki can skip the event and change shifts. Convinced that she can take on the character, Misaki learns from her friends Sakura Hanazono and Shizuko Kaga, then practices on the Idiot Trio. As Little Sister Day arrives, Misaki awes the customers with her improved little sister act. However, when Usui shows up, he constantly nags her and requests impossible orders, which causes Misaki to lose her temper. When he tries to leave, she begs him to stay, causing spectators to be attracted to her moe qualities. The next day at school, Usui witnesses Misaki rescuing a male student from a falling ladder in the library. Noticing that her arm was injured by the ladder, Usui convinces Misaki to bandage it up in the school infirmary. Maid Latte later hosts a "Maid Power Rangers Day", and Misaki is dressed in white, which was suggested by Usui due to Misaki's refusal to be influenced by others.
| 4 | "Net Idol Aoi"; Transliteration: "Netto Aidoru Aoi-chan" (Japanese: ネットアイドルAOIちゃん) | April 22, 2010 |
Maid Latte is visited by Aoi Hyoudou, a famous net idol who is introduced as Satsuki's niece. An excited Aoi wears the maid uniform, though Misaki tries to tell Aoi that it is only for an employee to wear. Aoi finds Usui attractive, but he repeatedly ignores her advances. When coworker Erika alerts Satsuki that the café chef called in sick, Usui volunteers to help, impressing the ladies with a modified version of omurice. The next day, Aoi confronts Misaki for not wearing feminine clothing. The following day, Aoi is so persistent with her advances that Usui pushes her onto the locker room floor, just as Misaki arrives to push Usui away and slap Aoi. It is revealed that Aoi is in fact a cross-dressing boy, who ran away from home because his classmates made fun of him for liking girlish things. The day after that, Misaki and Aoi spend some time together, and he eventually watches as she solely takes down a burglar in the streets. Although they agree that they both should just be themselves, Aoi gives Misaki a cute dress several days later, much to her embarrassment.
| 5 | "First Time Minding the Shop"; Transliteration: "Hajimete no Orusuban" (Japanese: 初めてのお留守番) | April 29, 2010 |
After scolding student council vice president Shōichirō Yukimura over the phone for slacking off in paperwork, Misaki is soon warned by Satsuki about stalkers targeting girls working in cosplay cafés. With Misaki refusing to take armed weapons for protection, Usui pretends to stalk her after school, even when she finishes the paperwork for Yukimura, sees Sakura off to the subway station and goes to work at Maid Latte during the night shift. After Erika and coworker Subaru leave work early, Usui gives Misaki a scare after she closes the café. The next day after school, Misaki closes the café again at night since Satsuki had to leave work a few hours earlier. This time Misaki is captured by two stalkers who posed as customers. Usui hears the commotion from outside and prepares to kick the window, but Misaki breaks free from the handcuffs and duct tape, beating up the stalkers with aikido and shattering their sadomasochistic fantasy. A few days later, Aoi returns to Maid Latte in order to send Misaki, Honoka, Erika, Subaru and even Usui a photo of Misaki wearing the cute dress for their cellphone wallpapers, much to Misaki's horror.
| 6 | "Men & the Ayuzawa Cram School"; Transliteration: "Otoko・Ayuzawa Juku!" (Japanese: 男・鮎沢塾!) | May 6, 2010 |
The Inuyama Brothers, quintuplets who are fans of Misaki at school, are admirably eager to know everything about her, but this could reveal her secret part-time job. She manages to dodge them at the subway station, thanks to Usui. At Maid Latte, Usui takes a photo with Misaki in twintails wearing her maid uniform. Misaki is eventually reminded that she might have to stop running away and tell the truth to the Inuyama Brothers. One day on the school roof, Misaki tells Usui that she plans on being upfront with the Inuyama Brothers about her part-time job. She is caught off guard when Usui kept the photo with him, as she knocks it out of his hand and in the direction of the Inuyama Brothers. He steals her first kiss before jumping off the school roof, then grabs the photo after falling in the school swimming pool. While Misaki is relieved to find Usui alright, the Inuyama Brothers are soon convinced to believe that Misaki is Usui's bodyguard, thus keeping Misaki's secret safe. Misaki later visits Usui at the hospital, but leaves in disgust when he asks her to nurse him in her maid uniform.
| 7 | "Enter the Student Council President of Miyabigaoka"; Transliteration: "Miyabigaoka Gakuen Seitokaichō Tōjō" (Japanese: 雅ヶ丘学園生徒会長登場) | May 13, 2010 |
Misaki continues having thoughts about her first kiss, following Usui's patient discharge. She receives a call from Sakura and Shizuko, who ask her to stop a fight between two students from Seika High School named Takamizawa and Ishida and three students from the prestigious Miyabigaoka High School led by Hirofumi Koganei. Misaki dismisses her feelings of Usui after she witnesses him kissing Yukimura. With Usui tagging along on the bus, Misaki learns from Takamizawa and Ishida that Koganei insulted them for taking interest in chess and called them insects. Upon arriving at Miyabigaoka High School, Misaki tells Koganei that her classmates will apologize if he apologizes first. Koganei complies only if he is beaten in a chess match, though Usui humiliates him by winning. Tora Igarashi, the student council president of Miyabigaoka High School, later arrives at Seika High School in order to formally apologize to Misaki for Koganei's behavior. With gentlemanly manners, Igarashi attempts to offer Misaki a scholarship to Miyabigaoka High School. Maid Latte hosts a "Male Dress Up Day" to impress the female customers, but Usui reminds Misaki that she is still female. Meanwhile, Igarashi learns of Misaki's part-time job and reveals his hidden lecherous nature.
| 8 | "Misaki Goes to Miyabigaoka"; Transliteration: "Misaki, Miyabigaoka Gakuen e" (Japanese: 美咲、雅ヶ丘学園へ) | May 20, 2010 |
Kanade Maki, the student council vice president of Miyabigaoka High School, personally invites Misaki to transfer schools. Three days later, Misaki eventually goes to Miyabigaoka High School in order to say her final decision to Igarashi, though Sakura and Shizuko are worried that she will permanently leave Seika High School. Even though they want the best for Misaki, they rally the student council and her fans as they all head for Miyabigaoka High School in order to convince her not to transfer. Meanwhile, as Misaki is about to give Igarashi her response, Maki "accidentally" spills orange juice on her. Misaki is forced to wash off in the shower room, but she learns that her school uniform had been taken to dry cleaning and she is stuck wearing a skimpy maid uniform instead. Igarashi soon reveals knowing about Misaki's part-time job while assuming that she is looking for attention and money. However, Misaki declines his offer and has no intention of leaving Seika High School. As Igarashi attempts to violate Misaki, Usui rescues her. Afterwards, Misaki thanks Usui, who picked up her school uniform from dry cleaning. Misaki is greeted by her friends waiting outside the school gate.
| 9 | "Maid Sama Does Momotaro"; Transliteration: "Momotarō made mo Meido-sama" (Japanese: 桃太郎までもメイド様) | May 27, 2010 |
The story begins with Misaki as Momotarō being born from a peach, after Sakura and Yukimura as the guardians found it in the river. During her quest to rescue women captured by a demon, Misaki saves the Idiot Trio as a dog, monkey and pheasant from being eaten by Usui as their ringmaster after they mention that a demon was recently seen at a village. Forming a group of five, they arrive at Seika Village, currently a wasteland filled with madmen and without women to perform household chores. Obtaining directions to Demon Island, the group cross the ocean and encounter some distracting characters. Upon finally arriving at Demon Island, Misaki and the Idiot Trio are shocked to find the village women living happily in a grand palace. Furthermore, Usui reveals himself as the demon, though the women only followed him to escape serving the selfish village men and took over the palace. The story ends with the claim that Misaki and Usui became a couple, despite Misaki's protests and the Idiot Trio's unfortunate deaths. In reality, Misaki was dreaming during her nap in the student council room, due to Usui sending subliminal messages through an audio recording of the story.
| 10 | "Sakura's Indie-Label Love"; Transliteration: "Sakura no Koi wa Indīzu" (Japanese: さくらの恋はインディーズ) | June 3, 2010 |
Both an avid fan of the indie rock band UxMishi and in love with vocalist Kuuga Sakurai, Sakura invites Misaki and Shizuko after school to an upcoming tea party hosted by UxMishi at a restaurant called Sun Vaca Cafe, where the Idiot Trio surprisingly work part-time as waiters. On the day of the tea party, Kuuga takes interest in Misaki and ignores Sakura. Following a private discussion with bassist Kouma Yafu in the restroom, Kuuga attempts to entice Misaki with a free concert ticket. After Misaki's trip to the restroom, Kuuga and Kouma wait outside for her, as Kuuga admits that he does not have feelings for Sakura and the tea party was just an event for the fans. Usui intervenes with his disguise as a waiter and gives Misaki advice on how to deal with her current situation. After Kuuga hurts Sakura's feelings at the table, Misaki angrily grabs Kuuga by the necktie and disallows Sakura being handed over to someone like him. Outside Sun Vaca Cafe, Shizuko admonishes Misaki for her short temper and Sakura for her poor choice in boys. Misaki pats Sakura's head for comfort, hoping that Sakura will find true love someday.
| 11 | "The Secret of Takumi Usui Approaches!"; Transliteration: "Usui Takumi no Himitsu ni Semaru!" (Japanese: 碓氷拓海の秘密に迫る!) | June 10, 2010 |
Usui inadvertently meets Minako in the streets and helps carry some of her dropped apples. She invites him inside her house for tea with Suzuna out of gratitude. As Misaki arrives, she is shocked to see Usui there, dragging him to the park and warning him to stay away from her house. The next day, Misaki, Sakura and Shizuko decide to follow Usui after school in order to peek into his private life and confirm rumors about him being rich. However, Usui knows that he is being followed and leads them on a wild-goose chase around town. After leaving Maid Latte, they visit a health club, a suit store and a restaurant amongst other locations. When the girls give up tailing him all day, Misaki finds Usui at a pedestrian overpass, where he tends to a stray cat. Though she denies being interested in his private life, he remarks that it was the first time that she showed any interest at all. He gives her his home address just in case she changes her mind. Misaki later looks over the directions in her bedroom, while Usui is shown living alone in a tall apartment building with the stray cat.
| 12 | "Maid Sama & the Sports Festival"; Transliteration: "Taiikusai demo Meido-sama" (Japanese: 体育祭でもメイド様) | June 17, 2010 |
Following a "Kimono Day" held at Maid Latte, Misaki participates in the sports festival held at Seika High School. She wins the first eight events to secure the prizes for the female team. At the ninth event, the obstacle race, where the first prize is a kiss from an unwilling Sakura, Misaki takes the lead until Masaru Gouda attempts to push Misaki into the school swimming pool in order to disqualify her. Usui saves her from falling and wins the race, but he rejects the prize and gives it to Misaki as the runner-up. Later on, Misaki enters the twelfth event, the costume race, on behalf of Shizuko. Inside the changing tent, Misaki discovers that her mystery bag contains a maid uniform, unknowingly handcrafted by the Idiot Trio, but she accidentally switches it with Yukimura's costume. After seeing Yukimura jeered by the boys, Misaki resolves to help him, even after Usui explains that Yukimura is putting so much effort into this futile event. Misaki and Usui both don cool samurai outfits and defend Yukimura, finishing the race together. Yukimura enjoys himself, and Misaki is inspired to make the costume race even better next year.
| 13 | "Idiots & Juveniles & Heroes &..."; Transliteration: "Baka to Furyō to Hīrō to" (Japanese: バカと不良とヒーローと) | June 24, 2010 |
Gouki Aratake, the strongest delinquent in Seisen Middle School, yearns to be like his reformed upperclassman, the former gang leader Shiroyan, who is actually Naoya of the Idiot Trio. After the Aratake Gang follow the Idiot Trio to Maid Latte, the Aratake Gang deduce that Naoya has gone soft. Later, Aratake appears at Seika High School and abducts Yukimura dressed as a schoolgirl, who was mistaken as Naoya's girlfriend. After passing by Seisen Middle School, Misaki, Usui, the Idiot Trio and Aoi prepare for a rescue mission. They change into delinquent disguises, though they are momentarily interrupted by Suzuna, Satsuki, Sakura, Shizuko and even the Inuyama Brothers. Meanwhile, at the Aratake Gang's Secret Base, Aratake reminisces about the inspirational events caused by Naoya. Misaki, Usui, the Idiot Trio and Aoi arrive at the Secret Base, where a fistfight erupts between Naoya and Aratake. After Naoya wins, Aratake reveals that he only wanted to be a hero like Naoya. With the ordeal over, the Idiot Trio introduce Misaki to the Aratake Gang as their fearsome "maid and president", much to her horror. Amidst the chaos, everyone forgets about Yukimura.
| 14 | "Soutarou Kano of Class 1-7"; Transliteration: "Ichinen Nanakumi Kanō Sōtarō" (Japanese: 1年7組 叶爽太郎) | July 1, 2010 |
When the student council plans to hold an open house at Seika High School to attract more female enrollment, a gynophobic male freshman named Soutarou Kano is opposed to the idea and tries to derail the progress by hypnotizing the student council members. After finding Kano in the broadcasting room, Misaki is hypnotized and wakes up in the school infirmary. Usui is amazed to see her dazed and confused. When Kano later tries to stop Usui, the latter is revealed to be immune to the former's abilities. Misaki then finds Kano in the chemistry preparation room, but Kano seeks revenge by hypnotizing her to hate Usui forever if she falls asleep within the next twenty-four hours. Misaki stays up all night with Usui's constant calling. However, Kano hypnotizes Yukimura to give Misaki a sleep-inducing painkiller. She becomes extremely sleepy and falls asleep within five minutes before the time limit. As she nods off, she asks Usui if she will forget her feelings of gratitude towards him and hopes to get the chance of repaying him properly. Usui embraces her with the vow to help her whenever she needs and to make her fall in love with him all over again.
| 15 | "Bespectacled Rabbit at the Open Campus"; Transliteration: "Gakkō Kengaku-kai de Megane Usagi" (Japanese: 学校見学会で眼鏡うさぎ) | July 8, 2010 |
Overcoming drowsiness before the time limit, Misaki resists Kano's hypnosis. As punishment, Kano is forced to help female students assigned as cafeteria staff with the upcoming open house. With Yukimura as the staff leader, Kano eventually helps with preparations after initially trying to escape from Misaki's eye. On the day before open house, Sakura and Shizuko find a box of maid uniforms, and Misaki reluctantly agrees that the cafeteria staff should wear them during open house. When the day comes, Misaki guides all the middle school visitors to a tour around the school. Meanwhile, the Idiot Trio are upset that Misaki has not showed up at Maid Latte, so the other employees including kitchen staff members Sen and Mochi kindly welcome the Idiot Trio. Misaki assigns Usui to promote the sports clubs, while the cafeteria staff dress up Kano as a "bunny butler". Kano tells Misaki of his belief that all women are fragile. Realizing that his mother was not fragile but instead left his abusive professional wrestling father during childhood, Kano helps a female middle school visitor conquer her androphobia, the fear of men. Misaki also repays Usui for promoting the sports clubs by patting him on the head.
| 16 | "Maid Latte at the Beach House"; Transliteration: "Umi no Ie de mo Meido Rate" (Japanese: 海の家でもメイドラテ) | July 15, 2010 |
On the first day of summer vacation, Satsuki's younger sister Nagisa Hyoudou invites the Maid Latte employees to her beach house, though accompanied by Aoi and Usui. Maid Latte decide to host a "Guerilla Event" at the beach house to attract customers, but Misaki is not so keen on wearing a swimsuit as part of the maid uniform. She is momentarily convinced after seeing the other employees serve incoming customers, but Usui gives her a hickey on her back after she changes clothes, forcing her to wear her T-shirt in order to hide it. Later that night, the employees prepare to head to the local hot springs in order to celebrate, but Misaki reluctantly decides to stay behind after being spooked by Honoka's ghost story as well as the hickey. She later rushes after them alone, believing that they had left their free tickets behind. Getting lost along the way, she becomes frightened until Usui grabs her. Realizing his mistake, Usui apologetically hugs Misaki to calm her down. Aoi sudden arrives and tells Misaki to admit that she likes Usui. Upon reaching the hot springs, Misaki realizes that her effort was in vain since she brought the extra tickets.
| 17 | "Usui Becomes the Enemy"; Transliteration: "Usui, Teki ni Mawaru" (Japanese: 碓氷、敵に回る) | July 22, 2010 |
On the second day of summer vacation, Nagisa allows her nephew Aoi to continue cross-dressing only if he wins the local mixed doubles beach volleyball tournament. Impressed by Aoi's determination, Misaki agrees to be his teammate and learns from Satsuki that the winning team will be crowned the beach prince and princess. Usui and Erika surprise the others by also entering the tournament. Both teams easily defeat their competition, earning them a face-off in the final round. Frustrating over why Usui is being extremely competitive, Misaki embarrassingly blurts out her anger, much to the crowd's surprise. After Usui's next serve, Aoi "dives and digs", allowing Misaki to spike the volleyball over the net. When Misaki stumbles back towards the referee's stand, Usui luckily jumps in the way, consequently bruising his shoulder. Although Misaki and Aoi win the tournament, Misaki skips the festival in order to reconcile with Usui. Misaki is flattered when Usui reveals that he only entered the tournament to prevent her from being exploited as the beach princess. Their kiss is interrupted by a display of distant fireworks. At the end of summer vacation, a commemorative group photo is taken with everyone, including employees Sayu and Gon.
| 18 | "Maid Sama is a Footman"; Transliteration: "Meido-sama de mo Futtoman" (Japanese: メイド様でもフットマン) | July 29, 2010 |
In order to get over his gynophobia, Kano helps Yukimura with paperwork, due to Yukimura having feminine qualities. Usui still jokes with Misaki being his personal maid for a day as her repayment. After a "Shrine Maiden Day" is held at Maid Latte, Maki comes with an offer to buy Maid Latte for his family dining empire and replace it with a butler café. Igarashi gives his support to this cause and invites the employees to observe the footman auditions. On the following week at Miyabigaoka High School, Misaki and Subaru disguise themselves in black suits to prepare for the male-only footman auditions and prove their service skills. The first round, which is a series of obstacles, proves to be difficult. Misaki momentarily discovers that Naoya, Ryuunosuke, Yukimura, Kano, Usui and Aoi are all participating in the auditions. Subaru is disqualified after being exposed as a girl, while Aoi is disqualified for being recognized as underage. Igarashi suggests for Maki to allow Misaki and Usui to form a pair if they can prove their eligibility. Misaki passes the gender test by planting Usui's hand onto her flat chest. The two then successfully move on to the second round together.
| 19 | "Footmen Through a Change of Pairs"; Transliteration: "Pea Kuminaoshi de Futtoman" (Japanese: ペア組み直しでフットマン) | August 5, 2010 |
In the second round of the footman auditions, Usui and Misaki succeed in the required task of setting up an elegant table for afternoon tea. Usui also has to contend with Yukimura's curiosity by assuming a false identity and referring to Misaki as a boy. Before the final round begins, Misaki falls from the high stage after being startled by Yukimura, but Usui breaks her fall on the floor. Although Misaki is aware that Usui's arms are injured, she conceals this fact during the third round, which requires both of them to pass a simulation of customer interaction with Maki. However, Maki becomes suspicious when Misaki does all the work, but Usui attempts to cover it up by playing the violin. Misaki soon asks Usui to stop playing and lectures Maki on the importance of helping colleagues. Motivated by her speech, Maki decides to call off buying Maid Latte and move his butler café elsewhere. Misaki visits Usui's home to take care of him, though surprised to find him living alone in a luxurious apartment. She apologizes for being so reliant on him, but he professes that he has also become reliant on her.
| 20 | "The Vice President is a Prince?! / Aoi & Her Fun Companions"; Transliteration: "Fukukaichō wa Ōji-sama!? / Aoi to Yukai na Nakamatachi" (副会長は王子様!? / AOIとユカイな仲間たち) | August 12, 2010 |
Ruri Yukimura, who dreams of being a princess, refuses to acknowledge her older brother Yukimura since he does not meet her ideal image of a prince, which Usui surprisingly does. This gives Yukimura the idea that Usui should have a play date with Ruri. During the play date, Misaki, Yukimura, Kano and Aoi eventually witness Usui being a better older brother to Ruri, prompting Kano and Misaki each to interrupt the play date with Aoi's help. Ruri runs into a coffee shop and accidentally causes a cupboard to topple. Luckily, Usui stops the cupboard while Yukimura shields Ruri. When her prideful behavior goes too far, she apologizes and accepts Yukimura as her older brother after he scolds her. Sometime later, Aoi in his cross-dressing attire momentarily enlists Yukimura, Kano and the Idiot Trio to film a promotional video in a park. Afterwards, an escaping purse snatcher bumps into Aoi, causing him to drop the camera's memory card over the railing. Aoi nearly falls over but is saved by Misaki, who was chasing the purse snatcher. Despite Aoi's verbal abuse, the boys enjoyed the filming process. The memory card coincidentally lands below on Usui, who was lying on a park bench.
| 21 | "Usui's Rival?! Hinata Shintani"; Transliteration: "Usui no raibaru? Shintani Hinata" (Japanese: 碓氷のライバル？深谷陽向) | August 19, 2010 |
Misaki tells the sports club members to clean up their smelly clubrooms. Although they initially refuse, Yukimura convinces them otherwise upon mentioning that onigiri will be provided by the student council. After the student council finish making onigiri, the famished sports club members barge in the classroom to eat, but they discard and unknowingly insult Misaki's round and hard onigiri. Angered by this, Misaki chases the sports club members out of the classroom. Usui soon visits Misaki and praises her hard work. Kano overhears and wonders why Misaki and Usui will not profess their feelings. Later on, a transfer student named Hinata Shintani arrives. He irritates Misaki with his childish personality and gluttony for food despite being skinny in appearance, but the male students admire his innocent behavior and accurate sense of smell with snacks. Hinata reveals that he used to live in the area and has returned to find his first love, revealed to be Misaki. Upon hearing this, Misaki realizes that Hinata has been her chubby childhood friend "You-kun". Misaki later blurts out Hinata's nickname when he falls from a tree. Upon realizing Misaki's identity, Hinata lands on his feet and hugs Misaki, much to everyone's dismay.
| 22 | "Tag at the Forest School"; Transliteration: "Rinkan gakkō onigokko" (Japanese: 林間学校オニごっこ) | August 26, 2010 |
The sophomores of Seika High School take a field trip for a five-day journey to enlightenment at a Buddhist temple in a forest. Not only does Misaki have to deal with the interest of the girls in her relationship with Hinata, but Misaki also has to tolerate with Usui and Hinata vying for her attention. After dinner, Misaki accidentally gets trapped with Hinata in a locked storehouse, where he urges her to see him as a man. An eavesdropping Usui unlocks the storehouse, interrupting with a duel challenge against Hinata before Misaki can react. On the fourth day of the field trip, the boys lose their sanity due to the grueling activities and start lusting after the girls. As the girls brace themselves in their log cabin, Misaki goes outside to stop the boys and drives them away with the help of Usui and Hinata. When Hinata calls Usui an awesome guy, Usui teases Hinata for his diminutive vocabulary. Usui later confronts Misaki about her feelings for Hinata, and she explains that she only sees Hinata as a childhood friend. Relieved with her answer, Usui faints over Misaki against a tree due to hunger.
| 23 | "Maid Latte & a Whole Bunch of Sweets"; Transliteration: "Suītsu ōmori meido rate" (Japanese: スイーツ大盛りメイドラテ) | September 2, 2010 |
Erika asks Misaki for help after accidentally promising to date a customer, which is prohibited by the Maid Latte employees, should he win the dessert eating contest. A few days later, Misaki joins this contest in disguise to ensure that the customer loses. However, Hinata also joins and ends up beating the other contestants, which rewards him a commemorative photo with the maid of his choice. As Hinata naturally selects Misaki to be his maid, Misaki storms out in her disguise before Hinata can recognize her. On the park bench, Usui tries to comfort an exhausted Misaki. The next day, Satsuki and Erika create a diversion to keep Misaki's secret hidden from Hinata. With Usui as a witness, Misaki struggles to deceive Hinata by going to Maid Latte as a customer instead of a waitress. After she steps out due to the pressure, Hinata tells Usui that Misaki helped him properly grieve over his deceased parents during childhood. Misaki comes back and decides to reveal the truth to Hinata. Usui then dresses up like a butler to defuse a scene. Once outside, Usui warns Hinata to stay away from Misaki, who is confused by their jealous squabbles.
| 24 | "Lovey-Dovey Through Latte Magic ♥"; Transliteration: "Rate Majikku de Meromerorin ♥" (Japanese: ラテ・マジックでメロメロリン ♥) | September 9, 2010 |
The rivalry between Usui and Hinata causes both of them to be kicked out of the student council room by Misaki. The next day, Misaki learns that Maid Latte will be hosting an upcoming "Magical Maids Day", where the employees dress up as witches from an anime series. Meanwhile, Hinata meets Minako in the streets after picking up her dropped persimmons. After accompanying Minako to her home, Hinata explains to Misaki that he is searching for a cherry tree where they used to play together. When Magical Maids Day comes, the employees put on a magical performance for their customers. However, when Usui and Hinata each arrive, their tension results in Usui deciding to leave. Hinata asks Misaki to "cast a spell" on him so that he can find the cherry tree. After the work shift, Aoi wants to know the current relationship status between Misaki and Usui. While taking out the trash, Misaki finds Usui waiting for the same answer. He blocks her punch caused by embarrassment, then embraces her and murmurs a "no-lying spell" in her ear. She stops resisting his hug. Elsewhere, Hinata finds the cherry tree and convinces himself that his meeting with Misaki was fated.
| 25 | "Hinata & Misaki & Usui"; Transliteration: "Hinata to Misaki to Usui-kun" (Japanese: 陽向と美咲と碓氷くん) | September 16, 2010 |
Hinata, despite being popular with the girls during middle school, continues to think about Misaki. Sakura invites Misaki and Shizuko to the Yumesaki High School Cultural Festival where UxMishi are holding a concert, in which Sakura assures that Kuuga has changed for the better. Usui tags along after "begging" Misaki to let him come. Maid Latte hosts a "Fortune-Telling Day", in which Erika as a fortune-teller informs Hinata and Usui that their relationship with Misaki are respectively "a sinking paper boat" and "incompatible like fire and water". After the work shift, a depressed Usui provokes Misaki to ask if he is going to give up on her over his fortune. The next day, Hinata helps Misaki mop the mud-tracked wooden floor of the school entrance. Their clothes end up being soaked due to Hinata's negligence, prompting Usui to cover Misaki's revealing camisole underneath with his dress shirt and accompany her to get changed. Hinata sadly realizes that Misaki has fallen for someone else, which his friends from middle school had warned him about. A few days later, Misaki and Usui get separated from Sakura and Shizuko in the crowd of UxMishi fans at the Yumesaki High School Cultural Festival.
| 26 | "Too-Cruel Ayuzawa & Usui the Idiot!"; Transliteration: "Zurusugiruyo Ayuzawa, Usui no Aho!" (Japanese: ずるすぎるよ鮎沢、碓氷のアホ！) | September 23, 2010 |
After fleeing from the crowd, Misaki and Usui join a couples contest. Despite her initial reluctance, Misaki is teased and provoked by Usui. They complete the couples contest and win special tickets to the after-party fireworks. After the UxMishi concert, Misaki tries to find Sakura and Shizuko, only to find Kuuga instead. Misaki gets some reassurance that Kuuga is serious about Sakura. Kuuga wonders why Misaki is not dating Usui yet and accuses her of being cruel to him. During the after-party, Misaki and Usui dress up as Romeo and Juliet as part of their prize, as they go to an empty classroom to get a better view of the fireworks. With Kuuga's words on her mind, Misaki confesses to Usui that she wants to be with him even though she does not understand her feelings. They share a kiss during the display of fireworks. After he confesses his love for her, they leave the classroom while holding hands. As everyone continues with their daily lives the next day, Suzuna reveals knowing that her sister likes a boy, Aoi lives with Satsuki again and Hinata still vows to win Misaki's heart.
| OVA | "It's an Omake (New Special Episode)"; Transliteration: "Omake dayo (Shinsaku Tokubetsu Episōdo)" (Japanese: おまけだよ （新作特別エピソード）) | May 11, 2011 (DVD release) |
After her maid uniform gets damaged due to moving potted plants, Misaki asks Suzuna to mend it while she receives Suzuna's sweepstakes prizes delivered by Shizuko and Sakura, which are a clay pot used for cooking, a special tin box of tea and a gigantic radish. In the meantime, both Suzuna and Minako try on the fixed maid uniform before Misaki finally gets it back. While Misaki retrieves a stone to be used for making tsukemono, Usui and Hinata arrive at the Ayuzawa residence to deliver some vegetables given by Hinata's grandfather. After having dinner, Misaki asks Usui if he is still taking care of the stray cat that he adopted. He replies that he is, but has not given it a name yet. Misaki suggests that he should name the cat "Licht" after the tin box of tea. Later at his apartment, Usui thinks it is a great name since "Licht" is German for "Light".
