= List of Gakuen Alice chapters =

The cover of the first volume of Gakuen Alice as published by Hakusensha on February 19, 2003, in Japan.

The chapters of Gakuen Alice are written and illustrated by Higuchi Tachibana. They are published in the Japanese manga anthology Hana to Yume by Hakusensha and collected in tankōbon. Twenty-nine volumes have been released as of March 2013. The first was released on February 19, 2003, and the twenty-ninth was published in March 2013.

Gakuen Alice is licensed for an English-language release in North America by Tokyopop. Sixteen volumes have been published so far.

== Volume list ==
No.	Original release date	Original ISBN	North American release date	North American ISBN
01	February 19, 2003	978-4-592-17245-1	December 18, 2007	978-1-4278-0319-1
10-year-old Mikan Sakura is an orphan who lives in the country with her grandfather and best friend, Hotaru Imai. When Hotaru enrolls in a school for geniuses like her, Mikan is heartbroken and doesn't hear from Hotaru for six months. She later finds out that the school Hotaru has gone to is called "Gakuen Alice", a school that takes students with powers called an Alice. She also learns that the school gives out money to the parents in exchange for the child. worried, Mikan leaves her home and goes to the academy, where she meets Narumi-sensei, who tells her he can enroll her because she might be an Alice. She then meets Natsume Hyuga, a boy with the Fire alice who is deemed a dangerous person, and his best friend, Ruka Nogi, who has the Animal Pheromone Alice. She also reunites with Hotaru. She is given a task by Natsume to go to the Northern Woods to prove to Class B that she is an Alice. She goes with Hotaru and Linchou, and encounters Mr. Bear, who beats her up. To help them deal with Piyo, they trick Ruka into helping them. This angers Natsume who tries to force Mikan to show her Alice with his flames. Mikan stops him and Narumi congratulates her and says she has the Nullification Alice, and can enroll in Gakuen Alice.
02	July 18, 2003	978-4-592-17246-8	March 11, 2008	978-1-4278-0320-7
Mikan is accepted by a few classmates, except by Natsume's followers. She receives a No-Star rank because Jinno-sensei doesn't like her. Mikan learns the basic forms and types of Alices, as well as the five classes based on what Alice the student has. She is placed in the Special Ability Class because her Alice is very rare, where she is welcomed warmly. Mikan tries to befriend the rest of Class B, after Tsubasa talks with her about it. They play dodgeball, and everyone actually has fun. Mikan has a fallout with Narumi after she learns that he never sent her letters, but they makeup.
03	November 19, 2003	978-4-592-17247-5	June 10, 2008	978-1-4278-0321-4
It is almost time for the Alice Festival. Mikan and her class decide to have an RPG theme. Mikan visits Central Town for the first time. A celebrity, Reo, visits the academy to perform at the festival's concert, but he kidnaps an ill Natsume. Mikan and Sumire escape from the academy to save him, but are captured themselves. Reo reveals himself to be a member of Z, the school's enemy, and he plans to make Natsume join. Natsume plans to kill himself to stop Reo, but Mikan stops him in time. After Mikan is injured, Natsume angrily ingnites the hideout. They are put in the hospital, but Reo escaped. For her actions, Mikan is upgraded to Single Star.
04	March 19, 2004	978-4-592-18091-3	September 9, 2008	978-1-4278-0322-1
Mikan meets Nodacchi-sensei, who trains her Alice. The festival begins, but at first Mikan's Special class is rejected. They eventually become popular after Narumi, Ruka, and Sumire fail to win. Natsume comes, looking for ruka, and agrees to play out of jealousy of Mikan's friendship with Tsubasa. He wins and unintentionally picks Mikan as his slave. Mikan learns that Hotaru has an older brother, Subaru. Mikan, Natsume, and Ruka attend the Latent Class' Haunted Mansion, where Mikan and Natsume are trapped. Mikan realizes that she no longer hates Natsume, but is irritated at his attitude.
05	July 16, 2004	978-4-592-18092-0	December 9, 2008	978-1-4278-0323-8
Ruka's Somatic Class is doing a play called "The Sleeping Snow White in the Woods", and Ruka is playing the princess. Due to an accident, Mikan is to be a replacement for the role of the prince and Natsume is to play as a cat. Narumi wants Mikan and Ruka to kiss, but Natsume prevents this. After the festivities, the Technical and Special Ability classes are rewarded for the best performances. Narumi delivers Mikan a letter from her grandfather. Mikan and her friends attend the Last Dance; Mikan dances with Ruka, but Natsume rejects her. Mikan talks with Natsume, who calls her by name, which makes her heart beat. The students prepare for the semester exams. Mikan meets Kaname, who made Bear and is suffering from the same illness as Natsume.
06	November 19, 2004	978-4-592-18093-7	February 10, 2009	978-1-4278-0324-5
linchou comes back from a week visit with his family, while some students are mysteriously losing their Alices. Mikan meets Tono, her class representative. linchou discovers his Alice has been stolen. Mikan, Natsume, Hotaru, and Ruka search the premises when Z members attack the academy. Hotaru is shot by a female member and is hospitalized. Mikan, Natsume, and Ruka decide to go to Z's hideout to get a cure for Hotaru, against Tono and Tsubasa's wishes. The three children eat Gulliver's Candy to grow older so they can get to the Warphole in the high school. They get by and Hayami tells them that the Warphole does exist.
07	March 18, 2005	978-4-592-18094-4	May 12, 2009	978-1-4278-0325-2
Mikan, Natsume, Ruka, Tsubasa, and Tono teleport via the warphole to a wooded area. Mikan brings Penguin, the latest of Hotaru's inventions with them. The school discovers the children's escape and Z is aware of their presence. While talking about the Alice stone switching tradition, Mikan and Ruka promise to exchange stone (she, however, is unaware of its meaning of soulmates). Mikan then talks with Natsume and wants to give him a stone as well. They arrive at the hideout, but Mikan is pulled in by a skeleton and put into a cell, where she is confronted by the woman who shot Hotaru, But the woman is thinking about "Sensei" and their "child".
08	August 19, 2005	978-4-592-18095-1	July 11, 2009	978-1-4278-0326-9
Mikan says to the woman, Yuka, that she hates her for hurting Hotaru and linchou. Yuka hits her, but gives her the cure for Hotaru. Mikan tricks the skeleton into releasing her, while the boys reach Mihara and Shiki. Mikan arrives and tells Natsume to not protect her but let her be his strength. They are losing in the fight, but Yuka intervenes and gives Ruka a cure to his injury. She allows them to escape, during which Penguin dies. They return to the academy with the cure. Narumi meets up with Yuka and Shiki. Yuka reveals herself as Mikan's mother, who abandoned her to protect her from the academy. Narumi asks for the students' Alices, which she gives on the condition that he doesn't chase her. After Hotaru's discharge, Class B goes Christmas shopping and throws a late birthday party for Natsume.
09	December 16, 2005	978-4-592-18096-8	October 13, 2009	978-1-4278-0327-6
The students prepare for the Christmas party. Mikan meets Nobara, a member of the Dangerous Ability class, and they become fast friends. Nobara has a deep attachment to Persona. On the night of the party, Mikan gets Bear to play with Yoichi, who kisses her as thanks. This prompts Ruka to kiss her on the cheek. Ruka gets Mikan and Natsume to dance, but they accidentally kiss when they are knocked to the ground. Mikan rejects it as a kiss while Natsume insists they did kiss. Persona infects Narumi with his Alice. Mikan dances with a boy (the ESP) who knocks off her mask and warns her of bad luck. Mikan tells this to Natsume. While they argue over the kiss, Natsume kisses her for real. Mikan, Natsume, and Ruka are assigned to clean up their class days later. Mikan later become curious of her parents after talking with her friends.
10	April 19, 2006	978-4-592-18097-5	March 9, 2010	978-1-4278-0704-5
It is New Year's Day, and it's also Mikan's birthday, but she thinks everyone has forgotten it; they had, in fact, planned a secret party for her. Mikan and Hotaru are invited to the MSP's Hana Hime. Due to a prank by Tsubasa, Mikan is stuck to Natsume while Hotaru is stuck to Ruka and Youchi. After 1 hour, Mikan and Natsume separate but not the others. Natsume makes Mikan pretend they are still stuck so he can go to the MSP, forcing them to sleep together. The boys are forced to wear women's kimono as they arrive at the Hana Hime. Yoichi eats a Gulliver's Candy that makes him grow at age 13. Natsume goes looking around and encounters Nobara.
11	September 19, 2006	978-4-592-18098-2	June 1, 2010	978-1-4278-0705-2
Natsume demands that Persona tell him where his sister, Aoi, is. The Dangerous Ability students are told to capture Natsume's friends, who easily defeat them. Frustrated of how much Natsume has suffered, Ruka tells the girls of Natsume's past. At age 8, Natsume moved to Ruka's hometown with Aoi and their father. They became fast friends, but Aoi accidentally burned down their village and Natusme took the blame for her. As a result, he was enrolled into the academy. It turns out that Persona was the one who caused Aoi's Alice to go out of control. Mikan vows that she will never forgive anyone who has hurt Natsume and they rush to help him in his controntation with Persona.
12	December 18, 2006	978-4-592-18099-9	August 1, 2010	978-1-4278-0706-9
Ruka and the girls split up. Mikan finds Aoi, who has lost her sight and memories. They find Natsume fighting Persona. Mikan gets infected by Persona's Death Alice to protect Natsume. Although Persona warns her that the infection will kill her, she says that she is more afraid of seeing her friends hurt than dying. Aoi comes in, regains her memories of Natsume, and begs Persona to stop hurting Mikan. He tries to infect her for her "betrayal" but Mikan jumps in to save her. Mikan subconciosuly uses her Alice to stop Persona, who sees an apparition of a man smiling at him. Persona infects himself. Mikan is hospitalized and nearly dies, but she draws out Persona's Alice stone, revealing her Stealing Alice. After her discharge, Mikan and her friends send Aoi off to her father.
13	May 18, 2007	978-4-592-18100-2	October 1, 2010	1-4278-0878-3
Natsume acknowledges his love for Mikan for the first time while talking with Ruka. Class B plays the Alice switching game; Mikan gives her stone to Natsume, who secretly leaves his stone for her. The students celebrate Valentine's Day, which Mikan gives chocolates for everyone. Yura is graduating, and Class B decides to play a band for her. Sumire's bossy attitude causes many to quit. Jinno prefers Sumire's group rather than those Mikan's. At the graduation, though, everyone makes up and plays together at the graduation. A classmate of Class B is leaving the academy after he loses his Alice. A month later, Class B enters the sixth grade. The ESP wants to punish Natsume for his actions from Hana Hime, but he threatens to harm Mikan if he disobeys. As Mikan and Natsume meet up after class, a girl named Luna appears.
14	September 19, 2007	978-4-592-18520-8	December 1, 2010	978-1-4278-1156-1
Luna enrolls in Class B. She replaces Mikan's seat next to Natsume. She flirts with Natsume, much to Mikan's jealousy. She, however, acts sinisterly upon learning Mikan's Alice. The students get ready for the Sports Festival. Luna causes a chaos to lure Mikan away and threatens to hurt her, but tells her that if she acts like a good girl, Luna will tell her the truth of her parents. Luna attributes the chaos to Mikan, but the HSP has Goshima, the student council president, come to her defense. Tsubasa confesses to Natsume that he was moved to the Dangerous Ability Class by the ESP, but Mikan must never know. Mikan tries to not let Luna's bullying prevent her from having fun. Mikan has lunch with Ruka after he wins the track competition. But, Natsume, disguised, brings Mikan into a borrowing game, which his borrowing request was to bring the person he loved. Mikan suspects it was Natsume.
15	March 19, 2008	978-4-592-18521-5	-	—
Luna tells Mikan that Natsume was with her during the competition. Mikan is nearly seriously injured during the cheerleading competition by Luna. Natsume tries to confront her, but she threatens him. Mikan is not punished after the teachers conclude that the accident wasn't her fault. Elsewhere, Shiki tells Yuka that Luna is actually an assassin for the ESP and has taken the form of an 11-year-old to get into the academy. Yuka realizes that Luna is spying on Mikan for the ESP and rushes back to the school. As Luna spreads rumors about Mikan, her friends defend her, but Natsume, under orders from Luna, tells them not to get involved with her. Mikan, heartbroken of his words, flees but is hugged by a disguised Natsume. She forgives him. During the final contest, Mikan clashes with Luna and they are knocked out after using their ALices. Mikan's team wins by default. They return to class days later. While talking with Hotaru and linchou, Goshima points out that Mikan has the Stealing Alice.
16	July 17, 2008	978-4-592-18522-2	-	—
Mikan suspects that she and Yuka are related if they have the same Alice. The middle school students play a prank on Class B by switching their bodies. Luna mistakenly tells Hotaru (in Mikan's body) that she will lose her most important person. After getting back her body, she encounters Natsume and thinks he is Bear. She tells him of how confused she is of his feelings for her and he holds her hand, and promises to never leave her. Mikan finds Narumi badly infected and, against his will, she removes Persona's Alice from his body. He makes her promise to never reveal her Stealing Alice. Mikan and Bear become friends after she fixes him up.
17	December 19, 2008	978-4-592-18523-9	-	—
During a mission, Tsubasa goes missing. Mikan learns that he is in the Dangerous Ability Class and blames herself. Natsume visits with her to comfort her and promises to find Tsubasa for her. Luna uses her Alice to control students to cause chaos so Mikan can be taken away. She is greeted by the ESP, who tells her that she is the newest member of the class. Mikan and Luna clash, resulting in Mikan taking Luna's Alice. Before Luna can harm her, Natsume saves Mikan and confesses that he loves Mikan. Nobara helps Mikan and Natsume escape with Narumi, who tells them to get the MSP. He also wants to take Mikan out of the academy for her own safety. Natsume wants to run away with Mikan forever, and so does she. The MSP tells the couple that their friends will be punished for helping them escape. They are reunited with Hotaru and Ruka, and are teleported to the HSP's office, where Yuka is hiding.
18	March 19, 2009	978-4-592-18524-6	-	—
The HSP tells Mikan the shocking truth of her family; she is his niece and the daughter of his younger brother, Izumi, who died before her birth. He also tells her that Yuka is her mother and he wants them to leave together. Mikan refuses. Natsume tells them to let Mikan see what her mother is like so she can decide. The HSP has Nodacchi take the four children time-traveling so they can learn the truth. Mikan learns that her father was her mother's elementary teacher, and how her mother was abandoned at the academy by her parents. In elementary school, Yuka tried escaping but was conforted by Izumi. she later met Luna, who became her best friend until middle school when Yuka accidentally stole her Alice. Yuka became a pawn for the ESP and eventually fell in love with Izumi. In midst of this, Tsubasa suddenly reappears.
19	July 17, 2009	978-4-592-18525-3	-	—
Mikan is relieved that Tsubasa is alright. He reveals that during the mission, he was injured and lost, and Yuka had saved him. They continue watching the past. At age 13, Yuka met Narumi (age 10) and Izumi made them partners. They fought frequently, but Narumi eventually fell in love with her. She rejected his feelings, especially after he tried to force himself on her. By age 15, Izumi discovers the tomrnet she is suffering from the ESP and rescues her. She meets Kaoru, a high school student who becomes her closest friend and confidant. It is also revealed that Kaoru is Natsume's mother, who died when he was young. Kaoru takes Yuka to the MSP, who appoints Shiki (her relative) as Yuka's protector. By the spring, Kaoru graduates from the academy. Izumi is troubled by his growing feelings for Yuka.
20	November 19, 2009	978-4-592-18526-0	-	—
Izumi brushes his feelings off due to that Yuka is a student and he is a teacher. When the ESP proposes marriage, Yuka confesses her love to Izumi, who at first rejects her but later confesses his feelings for her. After receiving the HSP's approval, Izumi and Yuka enter in a relationship. He introduces her to Rei Serio (Persona) who is kept isolated due to his Alice infecting his body. Yuka inserts Izumi's Alice into him to ease the infection. Realizing their mutual goal to have a happy family, Izumi and Yuka consummate their relationship. The next day, he is called into the ESP's office because Rei was let out of his cell. The ESP tells Rei that Izumi never intended to release him, and believing this to be true, Rei accidentally kille Izumi. His death is ruled a suicide, but Yuka learns the truth. she inserts Rei and Izumi's Alices into the ESP, causing him to shrink. She says goodbye to Narumi before meeting up with the HSP. She plans to live on the outside world. The HSP tells her that she is pregnant with Izumi's child, who has an Alice.
21	April 19, 2010	978-4-592-18527-7	-	—
Yuka arrives at her parents' house, but quickly leaves. During the rest of her pregnancy, she searches for Kaoru. When they finally reunite, Yuka goes into labor, and gives birth to a baby girl, Mikan. Kaoru, now pregnant with Natsume, takes in Yuka and Mikan. However, months later, Yuka flees with Mikan to not cause any more burden to Kaoru. As she is being chased by the ESP's men, an elderly man shelters her and Mikan. Yuka decides to leave Mikan with the man so she will be safe. The man adopts Mikan as his granddaughter. Shiki finds Yuka and takes her to Z, who offer a position. Yuka refuses because Z's boss is the son of the ESP's clone. However, she changes her mind when Kaoru is killed in a car accident, and vows revenge against the ESP. Mikan and her group decide to help Mikan escape with her mother. When they teleport to the HSP's office, they learn that the ESP has attacked and is searching for them.
22	August 19, 2010	978-4-592-18528-4	-	—
Mikan inserts different Alices into her friends so they can confront the ESP. They realize that someone in their circle has betrayed them because the ESP is aware of their whereabouts and plan to help Mikan escape. The ESP orders Persona and the Dangerous Ability Class to capture Mikan, and several of the academy's students are under Luna's control. Meanwhile Narumi is with Yuka and tells her he wants to escape with her and Mikan. Nobara separates from the group so she can deal with Persona and the Dangerous students alone. She freezes her classmates and pleads with Persona to apologize to Mikan, and mentions Izumi's death. Persona has a mental breakdown, and infects her and himself. They collapse together, but Nobara promises that she will protect Persona.
23	December 17, 2010	978-4-592-18529-1	-	—
Seeing her brother under Luna's control, Hotaru separates from the group and saves Subaru by removing Luna's Alice from in him. Tsubasa and Tono decide that Ruka will take Mikan to the Keyhole and Natsume will stay behind to help defeat the Fuukitai. With her new Telepathic Alice, Mikan feels the intensity of Natsume's feelings for her, and realizes that she is indeed in love with Natsume and confesses to him. Ruka confesses his love to Mikan but says he will support Mikan's relationship with Natsume. While discussing who the traitor might be, Tono believes it to be Nodacchi because he saw him with the ESP earlier. But, Natsume realizes it was Goshima disguised as Nodacchi. They send Natsume to tell Mikan the truth, and the couple embraces when they reunite. Mikan and Yuka also reunite as mother and daughter. Luna arrives and orders that they be captured. When Yuka tries to insert the key into the hole, the door explodes.
24	May 19, 2011	978-4-592-18530-7	-	—
Yuka is severely wounded from trying to protect Narumi from the blast. She holds Mikan and apologizes to Luna before she dies. The ESP arrives and everyone realizes that he had ordered Goshima to kill Yuka. Goshima captures Mikan and is about to hand her to the ESP, when Z attacks the academy. Shiki offers a deal with the ESP; the ESP will stop his corruption and let the students live peacefully, and in return, Shiki will fix the barrior protecting the school. The ESP at first rejects this, but agrees on the condition that Mikan will be under his control. Mikan agrees, in order to protect her friends. After her mother's funeral, Mikan is put into the Labyrinth Mansion and separated from her friends (except for Bear, Shiki, and the HSP). Although she accepts her situation, she is saddened. Her friends decide to send her Christmas presents to cheer her up.
25	September 20, 2011	978-4-592-19233-6	-	—
Shiki is ordered to return the ESP's Alice stones back to him because Yuka stole them. Shiki has no choice but to give them back or else the ESP will make Mikan's situation worse. At the Christmas party, Natsume goes looking for Mikan, and Shiki decides to let them see each other as his "gift". Mikan and Natsume profess their love to each other, exchange Alice stones, and make a promise to be together forever and seal it with a kiss. Afterwards, Natsume confides in his fear of dying and being unable to see Mikan again to Ruka, and he wants to Ruka to take care of Mikan if he does die. Shiki hires Narumi to spy on the ESP because he suspects that the ESP planning to ally with Z. Natsume demands information from Narumi because he wants to have a happy future with Mikan, but Narumi refuses to tell him. The ESP invites Reo and Z's boss to the New Year's concert, much to everyone's shock.
26	February 20, 2012	978-4-592-19426-2	-	—
Natsume, Ruka, Tsubasa, and Tono decide to confront the ESP and Z so they can save Mikan. The HSP and Shiki have also planned to assassinate the ESP, with Narumi ordered to kill him. During the concert, Reo tries to attack the ESP, who escapes. Narumi captures the ESP and tells the students of how the ESP has stolen the innocence and lives of so many people. After cutting his throat, the ESP is revealed as Goshima and the real ESP has Z's boss shoot Narumi. The ESP tries to convince the students that Narumi is the enemy, but they don't believe him and attack him. Natsume tries to kill the ESP, who escapes at the last second but badly injured. He orders that Mikan be brought to him. Jinno orders Nodacchi to teleport the students away, but Hotaru pushes Natsume and Ruka back so they can save Mikan. The Fuukitai try to get Mikan, but are attacked by the Dangerous Ability Class. Mikan sees Nobara's spirit in front of her.
27	June 20, 2012	978-4-592-19427-9	-	—
Mikan realizes that Nobara is close to death and teleports to the emergency room. Against Sakurano and Subaru's wishes, Mikan uses her Stealing Alice to save Nobara. Persona and the Fuukitai arrive, but Persona defeats them. He apologizes to Mikan for his actions and wants to help her. Initially reluctant, Mikan agrees and they begin looking for the ESP. Mikan is surprised that Persona has truly changed into a better person and she can forgive him for his sins. Persona promises that he will atone his sins for her and protect her with his life. Mikan rephrases this; Persona will atone his sins and protect her, but they will go visit with Nobara when this is over. When Natsume and his group find the ESP's hiding spot, they find that he had moved to a different room. when they finally find him, Natsume tries to kill him, but Z's boss protects the ESP. A controlled student stabs Natsume in the back.
28	November 20, 2012	978-4-592-19428-6	-	—
Z's boss dies and turns into an Alice stone, which the ESP claims. Determined to protect his friends, Natsume forces everyone out of the building and sets fire around the ESP. Persona takes numerous stab wounds to protect Mikan, and becomes too weak to go on. He tells her to get to Natsume, even though Mikan is reluctant to leave him behind in this condition. Mikan eventually leaves when she learns of Natsume's condition, and Persona is rescued by the Dangerous Ability Class. Exhausted and losing too much blood, Natsume loses consciousness. Mikan finds him not breathing, and pleads with him to come back to her. Mikan uses the last of her Alices to stop his flames. The ESP is thus free and orders that they be captured despite their own severe injuries. Luna finally decides to stop the ESP, because of him, she has lost something (Yuka) important. Although she assures him that she loves him, she takes his soul as punishment for his crimes, and kills him. Natsume's heart stops beating and Mikan realizes that she has no Alices left, other than her stone. Despite knowing she will be expelled from the academy if she uses the last of her Alices, she does it anyway to save Natsume.
29	March 19, 2013	978-4-592-19429-3	-	—
Mikan's sacrifice is in vain: Natsume is now dead. Hotaru, however, pleads with Subaru and Nodacchi to save him. They decide to travel to the past and find a way. Everyone celebrates the ESP's death. Mikan finds out that not only will she be expelled but her memories will be erased in order to protect her from enemies, which Mikan refuses to let happen. Mikan reunties with her friends and classmates, and even though she smiles in front of them, she cries alone because she misses Natsume. Unsure if Natsume will ever return, Ruka once again confesses his love to Mikan, but still accepts that Natsume is better. The night before she is scheduled to leave, Mikan wakes up to find Hotaru in her room.
30	August 20, 2013	978-4-592-19430-9	-	—
It is revealed that Hotaru, Nodacchi, and Subaru traveled back to the moment when Natsume stopped breathing, and Subaru uses his Healing Alice to revive the past Natsume. They then take the past Natsume and leave the deceased one in the past. After hearing about Mikan's due departure, Hotaru is granted one last time to see her, before returning to the time flow, where she and Subaru risk their lives to save Nodacchi and Natsume from being lost in time. The next day, Mikan's memories are erased and she is returned to her village. Four years later, Natsume, Narumi, and Goshima (now good again) locate Mikan in order to reunite her and Natsume. Her memories and Alice are returned to her, and she begins a journey to find Hotaru with the help of Natsume and Ruka.
31	September 20, 2013	978-4-592-19471-2	-	—

=== Omakes ===
Six months after the conclusion of Gakuen Alice, Higuchi published a series of omakes that revealed small revelations of what happened to some of the main characters.

- Mikan and Natsume got married and lived a happy life together.
- Natsume's life span has expanded due to Mikan's Nullification Alice stone being inserted in him.
- Hotaru and Subarau continued to travel through different timelines, but managed to briefly reunite with Mikan.
- Ruka is still in love with Mikan but continues to support Mikan and Natsume's relationship.
- Tsubasa and Misaki got married.
- Sumire and Kokoro started dating.
- The ESP continued to retroprogress until he turned into an infant and is still cared for by Luna.
- Persona and Nobara had a baby daughter.
