= List of Gakuen Alice episodes =

Gakuen Alice is a 2004 Japanese anime television series based on the manga series of the same name by Tachibana Higuchi. Consisting of 26 episodes and one special, the series aired on NHK-BS2 between October 30, 2004, and May 14, 2005. The television series was produced by Group TAC under the direction of Takahiro Omori. Script composition was by Masashi Yokoyama while music composition was by Makoto Yoshimori.

== Episode list ==
No.		Original air date
1	"Our School Will Be Gone!" / "The School is Gone☆"; Transliteration: "Gakkō ga naku natchau☆" (Japanese: 学校がなくなっちゃう☆)	October 30, 2004
Mikan Sakura is a cheerful and innocent 10-year-old girl who lives in the country with her grandfather. As she is preparing to save her school from being demolished, she remembers when she met her best friend, Hotaru, a year ago after the girl moved to the village. While the two constantly fight because of their opposing personalities, Mikan and Hotaru care deeply for each other, as close as sisters. Mikan discovers that Hotaruu is moving away to go to an elite school in Tokyo, which devastates Mikan, but they promise to stay in touch. However, six months go by with only a single letter from Hotaru. Mikan learns that the school Hotaru left for is called Alice Academy, which accepts students with a unique ability called an "Alice" and it treats the students like slaves. Worried, Mikan leaves her grandfather and goes to Alice to Academy, where she meets Narumi, a teacher who tells her that she may be an Alice and he can help her. As he is about to tell her what Alice he thinks she has, the school's wall explodes and a boy Mikan's age appears, wearing a black cat mask. Narumi tells Mikan that the boy's name is Natsume Hyuga, who has the Fire Alice.
2	"Welcome to Alice Academy!" / "Welcome ☆ to Alice Academy"; Transliteration: "Yōkoso ☆ Arisu Gakuen e" (Japanese: ようこそ☆アリス学園へ)	November 6, 2004
Narumi knocks Natsume out and brings the two children inside the school. He leaves them to talk with the Elementary Principle. Misaki-sensei comes in the room, looking for Narumi, and talks with Mikan. She asks about Natsume, and he tells her that Natsume is considered a dangerous person and should be punished for his attempted escape, but Narumi will cover for him. When he leaves, Mikan is suddenly held down by Natsume, who threatens to burn her hair if she doesn't tell him who she is. Another boy, Ruka, comes through the window and reveals himself to be Natsume's best friend. When the teachers finally arrive, the boys escape, with Natsume revealing Mikan's skirt, to taunt her. Narumi cheers her up by showing her new uniform, as well as bringing in Hotaru. The two best friends share a happy reunion.
3	"I'm Not Going to Lose to Any Alice!" / "I Won't Lose To An Alice☆"; Transliteration: "Arisu nanka ni makete tamaru ka ☆" (Japanese: アリスなんかにまけてたまるか☆)	November 13, 2004
Mikan is brought to her new homeroom, Class B, which is revealed to have some of the most rebellious students in the elementary branch. Hotaru asks Mikan to pretend they are strangers, which surprises Mikan. The class accepts Mikan with skepticism due to that she doesn't know what her Alice is yet, and is seated next to Natsume and Ruka, which shocks her. She is immediately disliked by her classmates when she insults Natsume. They even accuse her of tricking the school, but Natsume offers a deal: she must go to the Northern Woods and survive its tasks, and if she succeeds, he will see to it that she is enrolled. Mikan accepts and brings Hotaru and linchou along.
4	"This is My Alice" / "This is My Alice☆"; Transliteration: "Kore ga uchi no Arisu ☆" (Japanese: これがウチのアリス☆)	November 20, 2004
Mikan and her friends enter the Northern Woods, where they encounter Bear, who proceeds to beat Mikan up. Mikan asks them to tell her more about Natsume. They tell her to stay away from him because he is feared by everyone and it is rumored that he is a murderer, but this makes Mikan more interested in learning about him. They also encounter Piyo, a giant chick. When Hotaru realizes that they need Ruka, who has the Animal Phermone Alice, they trick him into helping him. When Natsume finds out, he is angry and tries to force her to reveal her Alice. When he threatens to harm Hotaru and linchou, Mikan lunges at him and stops his flames. Narumi knocks Natsume out and reveals that her Alice is Nullification.
5	"The Star Class is Tough"; Transliteration: "Hoshi kaikyū wa shibia ya nā ☆" (Japanese: 星階級はシビアやなぁ☆)	November 27, 2004
Mikan is officially enrolled in the academy, but Natsume tells her that she will regret coming to the school. Her classmates have mixed feelings about her enrollment. Sumire mocks Mikan for knowing nothing about the academy and vows to make her life miserable. Sure enough, those who dislike Mikan proceed to pull pranks on her and this causes her strict teacher, Jinno, to declare a No-Star, branding her a troublemaker. Mikan is thus moved into a room in the attic, less necessaries, and given the most difficult chores. Although she is unhappy, she resolves to do her best, and this makes some of the bullies impressed by her strength.
6	"I'm With The Good-For-Nothing Types"; Transliteration: "Uchi wa misokkasu-kei ☆?" (Japanese: うちはみそっかす系☆?)	December 4, 2004
Mikan is told about the five Alice type classes: Latent, Technical, Somatic, Special, and Dangerous. Because Mikan's Alice is so rare, she is placed in the Special Ability Class, known for being the "good-for-nothing" types. She learns that Nastume is a Dangerous Ability type. While on her way to her first day with the class, she runs into him, and he orders her to keep quiet so a strange man won't find him. They are found by some middle school students and mistake Mikan as Natsume's girlfriend, and threaten to hurt her, but Natsume rebuffs them. Mikan is saved by another middle school student named Tsubasa, who is in the Special Ability Class. For the first time since her arrival, she feels welcomed by her Special Class.
7	"I Won't Lose the Alice Dodgeball"; Transliteration: "Makehen ☆ Arisudojji" (Japanese: 負けへん☆アリスドッジ)	December 11, 2004
Mikan introduces Tsubasa to Hotaru and Linchou, and learns that he gets along with Bear because Bear's owner is his best friend. Mikan confides in Tsubasa about how hostile and rebellious her classmates are. Tsubasa tells her that they are not acting out just to follow Natsume but because they simply want attention, and suggests that she do something to entertain them if she wants to be friends with them. Mikan asks her classmates if they want to play dodgeball, but when they reject her, she tells that she knows they know they will lose. They agree to play but on a deal: if they win, Mikan's team will be their slaves, and if Mikan's team wins, there will be no more bullying. Because more kids are on Natsume's team, Mikan's team is able to get ahead. So, Natsume's team starts cheating. In the game's climax, it is a face-off between Mikan and Natsume. At the end, Natsume's team wins, but Mikan says that she could tell that Natsume had fun, which angers him. As he leaves, Persona comes to fetch him because he has a mission.
8	"I Want To See Grandpa"; Transliteration: "Jīchan ni aitai ☆" (Japanese: じーちゃんに会いたい☆)	December 18, 2004
Mikan writes another letter to her grandfather, and Narumi promises to mail it. As she is talking about it with her friends, Natsume interrupts her and tells her that the school would never allow contact in the outside world, and Narumi never mailed her letters. At first Mikan doesn't believe him, but upon realizing that she has never gotten a responding letter from her grandfather, she searches Narumi's office and finds her letters. Narumi tells her that he lied about the letters in order to protect her, but Mikan refuses to listen to him. She decides to escape, but is nearly kidnapped and is saved by Narumi. Narsumi promises her that he truly will contact her grandfather, and Mikan forgives him, and asks him to let her call him "Grandpa" but says that he is only 20 years old so he suggests to call him "Dad" then falls asleep together.
9	"I Love You, Hotaru"; Transliteration: "Daisuki ☆ Hotaru-sama" (Japanese: 大好き☆蛍様)	January 8, 2005
Mikan meets a robotic replica of herself that Hotaru built after she moved away from their village. She did it because she missed Mikan so much and wanted to have something to remind her of her.
10	"How Exciting, Central Town"; Transliteration: "Ukiuki ☆ Sentoraru Taun" (Japanese: うきうき☆セントラルタウン)	January 15, 2005
Mikan hears about Central Town for the first time and wants to go. Jinno allows her, but on the condition that Natsume accompanies her. Mikan meets Yoichi, a little boy who is close to Natsume. Although Natsume refuses to go, Yoichi wants to and he finally agrees. Mikan, however, doesn't have enough money to buy any souvenirs, and decides that she really wants to buy some delicious candy that Yoichi loves. After several tries to earn enough money, she is able to buy some. She gives the last piece to Natsume as thanks for coming with her.
11	"Alice, I'm in Special Training"; Transliteration: "Tadaima Arisu ☆ tokkun-chū" (Japanese: ただいまアリス☆特訓中)	January 22, 2005
Mikan realizes that she has very little control over her Alice, and is offered a chance to train it. She goes to her Special Class for help, but they are too busy preparing for the upcoming Alice Festival to help her. Mikan starts to think about the purpose of Alices, and suddenly thinks about how dangerous Natsume's Alice is. Mikan is shocked that she is thinking about Natsume with concern for his well-being. She then meets Nodacchi, her Special Class teacher who can travel to the past. He offers to help her control her Alice by asking her to stop him from time traveling. When he tricks her into believing he will never return, she is able to stop him with her Alice and learns how to control it more.
12	"The School Festival is Here"; Transliteration: "Gakuen-sai ga yatte kuru" (Japanese: 学園祭がやってくる☆)	January 29, 2005
The academy is preparing for the Alice Festival. Mikan is excited and believes everyone else is. When she asks Natsume if he is, he tells her that the Dangerous Class is forbidden from participating. Also, her Special Class is not to happy because they are always voted the least popular. This angers Mikan that they are disregarding such an important even, and runs away to clear her mind. She finds Natsume and talks with him. She regrets getting angry at her friends, and Natsume suggests that she talk to them and is glad that she is able to get into a fight, considering that she is always friendly. Mikan feels better and talks with her Class, and they decide to use an RPG game as their theme for the festival. Meanwhile, Hotaru and Ruka find Natsume unconscious and take him to the hospital.
13	"Go After the Superstar"; Transliteration: "Toppu ☆ Sutā o oikakero" (Japanese: トップ☆スターを追いかけろ)	February 5, 2005
Natsume has been hospitalized for being ill, and Mikan, relieved he is alright, asks him to accompany her to the festival, which he refuses. She then asks him to at least visit her class' game, which he silently agrees. Meanwhile, the headmaster invites Reo, a celebrity, to perform at the festival concert. Everyone is thrilled to be able to see him, even though Mikan has never heard of him. She tries to help her friends get a chance to meet with him, but their plan goes wrong when their attempt causes Reo to say he is injured. At the hospital, Mikan and Sumire try to see Reo, and witness him assault and kidnap Natsume. The two girls quickly rush out of the academy to save him.
14	"Let's Bring Natsume Back"; Transliteration: "Natsume o Torimodose ☆" (Japanese: 棗を取り戻せ☆)	February 12, 2005
The girls escape from the school and follow Reo after kidnapping Natsume. However, they are also knocked unconscious and kidnapped by Reo's men. They are taken to a warehouse and bound so that they can't escape. Meanwhile, the teachers discover that the three are missing, and Hotaru tells them that Reo kidnapped Natsume and the girls tried to save him. The girls wake up and try to untie themselves, but fake sleeping as they listen to Reo talk about how Natsume burned down his childhood village at 8 years old and was put in the academy. Reo plans to make Natsume join Z, the school's enemy, as a spy. Natsume wakes up and realizes the situation, as Narumi gets a hold of them through Hotaru's transmitters. Reo catches them and tries to convince Natsume to join Z, but Mikan pushes him away. Reo realizes that Mikan is unaffected by his Alice and says she looks like "That Person". Natsume tells the girls that he will deal with Reo alone while they escape. As the girls are running away to get help, Mikan realizes that the reason Natsume is fighting Reo alone is because he is contemplating suicide.
15	"Let's Go Back to the Academy"; Transliteration: "Gakuen e Kaerō ☆" (Japanese: 学園へ帰ろう☆)	February 19, 2005
Realizing that Natsume plans to kill himself to defeat Reo and save them, Mikan runs back to the warehouse while Sumire is captured by an officer. Mikan is bale to stop Natsume just in time and asks him if he truly wants to die. He asks her why she came back, and she replies that she could never leave him because he is her partner. She is able to distract Reo and his bodyguards as she tries to escape with Natsume. They fall down a flight of stairs, and Natsume orders her to leave. She refuses and explains that even though she doesn't understand what problems he has, she can never leave him behind and wants the two of them to return to the academy together. They finally reach a compromise. Mikan tries to protect Natsume, but is injured. Natsume is angry that Mikan is hurt and ignites the warehouse. Some time later, Mikan wakes up in the hospital in the academy. Narumi tells her that they didn't find Reo, but Natsume is safe and she is upgraded to One-Star for her actions.
16	"Imagine the Maze, the Magic Lamp"; Transliteration: "Meiro de shōbu ☆ mahō no ranpu" (Japanese: 迷路で勝負☆魔法のランプ)	February 26, 2005
Mikan has become a little more accepted by her classmates for saving Natsume, even though he continues to ignore her. Her Special Ability Class opens up their RPG game, and after a long time of being rejected, it becomes popular. Natsume comes to it because he heard Ruka was playing, and insults Mikan's outfit. Seeing Tsubasa comforting Mikan makes Natsume jealous and he agrees to play the game on the condition that Tsubasa will be his slave. Natsume is able to easily win the game rounds, including Tsubasa, before reaching the final round, who is Mikan. He is supposed to capture her without touching her, and after some difficulty, he fakes being ill to get her close enough for him to capture her. He is then declared the first winner and is given a lamp to find a slave, but he wants Tsubasa. However, when he asks Koko to find Tsubasa's lamp, he accidentally picks Mikan's because he saw Mikan's face in Natsume's mind, thereby making her his slave.
17	"Hotaru's Secret"; Transliteration: "Hotaru no Himitsu ☆" (Japanese: 蛍のひみつ☆)	March 5, 2005
Mikan is forced to be Natsume and Ruka's slave throughout the festival. When they explore the Technical Class' area, she sees Hotaru and escapes from the boys to be with her. Soon after, Mikan meets a high school student, Subaru, who has the Helaing Alice, and is revealed to be Hotaru's older brother, a fact that not even Mikan knew. In a private conversation, Subaru reveals that this is the first time he has ever seen her because he was sent to the academy before she was born. Hotaru says that his departure was very hard on their parents and that is why they constantly moved around with her to avoid being taken by the academy. Although they are hostile towards each other, it appears that the two siblings care deeply for each other. Although irritated at Hotaru for not telling her about this secret, she is touched by Hotaru's devotion to her family.
18	"Just two of us, in the dark" Transliteration: "Kurayami de ☆ futarikiri" (Japanese: 暗闇で☆ふたりきり)	March 12, 2005
As they continue exploring the festival, Mikan, Natsume, and Ruka come across the Laten Class' area, which appears more fun. Linchou invites them to visit the Haunted House that he is in charge of. Although she denies being scared because she grew up in the country, Mikan is deathly afraid of ghosts and the dark, and often clings to Ruka, which makes Natsume jealous. In an accident, Jinno, who was dragged along by Sumire, gets scared and causes a blackout. This causes Mikan and Natsume to be separated from Ruka, and trapped in a tiny room. Natsume even goes as far as to saving Mikan from being injured after she faints from shock. As they wait for help, Mikan realizes that she no longer hates Natsume and has never seen him smile or laugh, and now understands that he is actually a kind person. Natsume brushes her off and calls her names, and when they are finally found, they are in a weird position from fighting.
19	"Raise the Curtain, Snow White in the Sleeping Forest"; Transliteration: "Kaien ☆ Nemureru mori no Shirayuki-hime" (Japanese: 開演☆眠れる森の白雪姫)	March 19, 2005
The Somatic Class is doing a play called "Snow White and the Sleeping Beauty", and Ruka is playing the princess, much to everyone's amusement. An accident caused by Koko and Kitsumune causes Mikan to be a substitute for the prince and Natsume to be a cat. Mikan is nervous because she has never acted before but Ruka assures her that he will help her. Narumi takes the position to change several parts of the play, against the wishes of the students who are acting. In the play's climax, with Mikan and Ruka, Narumi wants them to kiss to make the ending more exciting for the audience, much to their shock. Before they can actually do it, Natsume, overcome with jealousy, throws an apple at Mikan to stop it. Mikan and Ruka wonder who threw the apple, but only Hotaru knows.
20	"Who Will Have the Last Dance?"; Transliteration: "Rasuto dansu wa dare to ☆" (Japanese: ラストダンスは誰と☆)	March 26, 2005
For the last night of the Alice Festival, there will be the Last Dance. Natsume and Ruka are asked by numerous girls to be their dates, but the boys reject them. Mikan is content with going with her friends rather than a boy. According to the rumor, during the final dance, the two partners will be soulmates forever. Mikan is surprised to find that Yura has a boyfriend and Anna and Nonoka have a crush on Misaki. Mikan believes that she is too young to like a boy, and doesn't understand anything about dating. Natsume gets Ruka to dance with Mikan, who then dances with other people before going to look for Natsume, who has retreated away from the party. Mikan invites him to dance with her, which he rejects because she should not get tainted by his darkness. He then tries to force her to leave, but when she complains that he has never called her by name, he does, which makes Mikan's heart pound. Ruka overhears this and notes that Mikan is the first girl he called by name. In the climax, Mikan is picked as Hotaru's last dance partner.
21	"Aim for the Honor Student Award"; Transliteration: "Mezase ☆ yūtōsei-shō" (Japanese: 目指せ☆優等生賞)	April 2, 2005
It is time for the semester exams, and Mikan is worried because she does terrible in tests. Her friends offer to help her study, especially after she learns that the student who gets the highest results gets a one-week visit with his/hers family. Mikan's desire to study her best inspires Natsume and his friends to also study hard, even though Natsume says he is too smart to study and always gets the best scores. Sumire feels lonely from the fact that Natsume has been giving Mikan a lot of attention lately, and Mikan helps her study for the girl's cooking test. On the day of the tests, everything goes well, until Natsume recognizes Persona in disguise as a substitute. Persona tells Natsume that he has noticed that Natsume has grown soft lately and warns him not to get close to anyone.
22	"Mr. Bear and the Prince"; Transliteration: "Bea to Ōji-sama ☆" (Japanese: ベアと王子様☆)	April 9, 2005
Mikan meets Bear's owner, Kaname, who has to create souls for dolls he makes. Mikan takes an instant liking to him. Mikan is concerned that Natsume has been avoiding her lately, but she tries not to let it bother her. It is revealed that Kaname makes dolls because he grew up without any friends. It also revealed that he suffers from a physical illness similar to Natsume, and is frequently hospitalized. Kaname's closeness with Bear inspires Mikan to put a bigger effort to befriend Bear, even though it still rejects her.
23	"The Circus is Here"; Transliteration: "Sākasu ☆ ga yatte kita" (Japanese: サーカス☆がやって来た)	April 16, 2005
Alice Academy is hosting a circus for the students. Reo is disguised as circus performer and is still determined to get Natsume to join Z, so he decides to turn Ruka against the academy.
24	"Mr. Narumi's Lie"; Transliteration: "Narumi-sensei no usotsuki☆" (Japanese: 鳴海先生の嘘つき☆)	April 23, 2005
Reo decides to turn Ruka against the academy by convincing him that the academy is abusing the use of Natsume's Alice, and Narumi is lying about it. Ruka believes it, knowing Natsume's secret missions and bad health. Ruka tells Mikan and the others that the academy is abusing Natsume and is responsible for his ill condition. Mikan believes that Natsume is being abused, but can't believe that Narumi is lying about it. They try to protect Natsume from being taken on any more missions, but his declining health forces them to take him to the hospital. Nevertheless, Persona goes to fetch Natsume for another mission. Mikan now believes Narumi has been lying about everything and rejects his explanations.
25	"Take Back the Academy"; Transliteration: "Gakuen o torimodose☆" (Japanese: 学園を取り戻せ☆)	May 7, 2005
In retaliation for what the school has done to Natsume, Ruka uses his alice to make the animals cause chaos in the academy. Mikan and the others try to stop him from hurting anyone, but he refuses to listen and is determined to get justice for his best friend. When it appears that Ruka might be turning against his own friends, Natsume suddenly appears and slaps some sense into him. Natsume tells Ruka that no one but him has control over his Alice. With that, Ruka finally calms down and peace is restored. Defeated, Reo is confronted by Narumi, who demands to know why had turned to Z. Reo reveals that he is angry at Narumi for remaining with the academy knowing what it does to its students. Narumi expresses forgiveness for Reo, in turn, does the same.
26	"Friendship is Endless" / "Friends ☆ Eternally"; Transliteration: "Yūjō wa ☆ endoresu" (Japanese: 友情は☆エンドレス)	May 14, 2005
It is spring, and it is time for graduation. Mikan learns that she has failed the semester exams and will have to retake them. She also learns that Hotaru is planning to enroll in an overseas project for a year, which worries Mikan about being separated from her friend again. At the graduation, Natsume notices her worries and talks to her. She asks him how he would feel if Ruka decided to transfer, and he says that he would let him because it would be his decision. With this in mind, Mikan decides not to follow Hotaru anymore and let her make her own choices. However, her friends and classmates see that she is heartbroken still and decide that the two need to say goodbye. While Mikan is taking her final exams, they manage to stall Hotaru long enough to get Mikan to say goodbye. Hotaru then reveals that she is not going overseas but was simply moving to another dormitory for her inventions. Mikan is happy to be able to remain with Hotaru, and proclaims that she loves Alice Academy.
