= Portrait of M & N =

Manga series

- Cover art of volume 1, as published by Hakusensha; featuring Natsuhiko (left) and Mitsuru (right).

MとNの肖像 (M to N no Shōzō)
- Genre: Comedy, Romance
- Manga
- Written by: Tachibana Higuchi
- Published by: Hakusensha
- English publisher: NA: Tokyopop
- Magazine: Hana to Yume
- Original run: October 19, 2000 – August 19, 2003
- Volumes: 6

Portrait of M & N (MとNの肖像, M to N no Shōzō) is a manga by Tachibana Higuchi. It is published in Japan by Hakusensha and is serialized in Hana to Yume. The manga series has 6 volumes and Tokyopop began its English publication on February 9, 2010.

== Plot ==
Mitsuru has a problem - a single, violent movement against her can get her begging for more. Her nickname M also stands for masochistic.

Natsuhiko learns Mitsuru's secret on their first day of senior high school. He also has a problem—only a glimpse of his reflection can send him into a flying fit about how beautiful he is! He is nicknamed N for narcissistic.

They both hope to minimize their chances of being exposed because of their weird behaviours

== Characters ==
Mitsuru Abe (安部 みつる, Abe Mitsuru)
Mitsuru is beautiful, graceful, admired by many people, but she has a weird problem. As an effect of her mother's "Spartan Love", a single violent movement against her can get her begging sweetly for more. She returns to her normal self once she faints. Her nickname M is the first letter of her name, but also stands for masochistic. She has an elder brother and sister. She is in love with Amakusa and because of her friendship with both Amakusa and Hijiri this has subjected her to bullying by the other girls in her class. However, she is still admired by the male classmates. She "protects" Hijiri from dogs and considers it her duty.
Natsuhiko Amakusa (甘草 夏彦, Amakusa Natsuhiko)
Natsuhiko is a guy who has found out Mitsuru's secret on their first day of senior high school. Even so, he has an equally bad problem. Even the mere glimpse of his reflection can send him into a flying fit about how beautiful he is. He tries to hide that by wearing glasses in school, tripping over any objects at times, avoiding the girls admiration of him and especially mirrors. But he gets his own dose at his mirror shrine in his bedroom, because N is narcissistic. Natsuhiko is nicknamed as N. He considers Mitsuru his first friend and vows to protect her and later falls in love with her. He gets easily jealous when other males touch or fawn over her, particularly Hijiri who he (Natsuhiko) knows that Hijiri likes her. He is currently oblivious to Hijiri's fear of dogs.
Eiichi Hijiri (聖 英一, Hijiri Eiichi)
Eiichi is Mitsuru's popular senior in school. He's handsome, athletic, and has the style of a strategist. He is also Yōichi's older brother (see Gakuen Alice). His biggest weakness are dogs and he dramatically screams and runs away whenever a dog is near or the very word 'dog' can send him into a fit. He also knows about Mitsuru and Natsuhiko's secret. Apparently, he is in love with Mitsuru, and though it's unrequited, he still tries to protect her. He just recently found out about Natsuhiko's weakness and frankly asks him (Natsuhiko) if an "N" can love someone other than themselves and claims that he (Eiichi) will steal Mitsuru.
Ririka Tsuji (辻 理々花, Tsuji Ririka)
Ririka is Mitsuru's friend from the same year. It appears that she is the only normal character throughout the series.
Yōichi Hijiri (聖 陽一, Hijiri Yōichi)
Yōichi's is Eiichi's younger brother. He is 3 years old. He appears as a student in the Gakuen Alice, the latest series of Tachibana Higuchi. Just like Gakuen Alice, he has the ability to see spirits and controlling them. In extra stories, it seems that he is the one who doing work behind Eiichi's work.
Reika Abe (安部 麗華, Abe Reika)
Reika is Mitsuru's mother. She's a landscape artist.
Kazuomi Abe (安部 一臣, Abe Kazuomi)
Mitsuru's older brother works as a dentist. He has an Oedipus complex that is not so apparent on the outside.
Saaki Amakusa (甘草 千秋, Amakusa Saaki)
Saaki Amakusa is Natsuhiko's mother. She used to be a member of Takarazuka, causing her to display an extreme character by dramatizing every single thing.
Noriko Hijiri (聖 倫子, Hijiri Noriko)
Noriko is Eīchi and Youichi's mother. Eīchi and Youichi's father died when they are young. Noriko remarried later on. She usually looks very plain and speaks in a weird accent, but her personality drastically changes when she wears make up.
Nariaki Madenokōshi (鞠小路 成顕, Madenokōshi Nariaki)
When Mitsuru was only 3 years old, her parents chose a person for her to marry. He is now 32 years old.
Kaname Miki (幹 要, Miki Kaname)
Kazoumi's friend during high school and Nariaki's secretary.

== Media ==
=== Manga ===
Written and illustrated by Tachibana Higuchi, the chapters of Portrait of M & N were serialized in the Japanese magazine Hana to Yume and collected into six tankōbon volumes by Hakusensha. The volumes were published from October 19, 2000, to August 19, 2003.

On May 30, 2009, Anime News Network noted that Portrait of M & N had appeared on the Canadian Amazon.com. Tokyopop licensed the series for an English-language release in North America. Volumes 5 and 6 were never released due to Tokyopop's closure in May 2011 and the series is out of print in North America.

=== Volume list ===
No.	Original release date	Original ISBN	North American release date	North American ISBN
01	October 19, 2000	978-4-592-17774-6	February 2, 2010	978-1-4278-1724-2
02	February 19, 2001	978-4-592-17273-4	June 1, 2010	978-1-4278-1725-9
03	September 19, 2001	978-4-592-17185-0	September 1, 2010	978-1-4278-1726-6
04	February 19, 2002	978-4-592-17620-6	February 1, 2011	978-1-4278-1727-3
05	May 17, 2002	978-4-592-17285-7	April 26, 2011	—
06	August 19, 2003	978-4-592-17286-4	October 18, 2011	—

=== Drama CD ===
There is a drama CD released on February 22, 2002, in Japan by the same name as the manga. The cast is as below.

- Yuko Minaguchi - Mitsuru Abe
- Minami Takayama - Natsuhiko Amakusa
- Akira Ishida - Eiichi Hijiri
- Chika Sakamoto - Ririka Tsuji

== Reception ==
Portrait of M & N ranked 18th on About.com's list of the 25 most anticipated new manga of 2010.
