= Hiro Fujiwara =

Japanese manga artist

Hiro Fujiwara 藤原ヒロ
- Born: December 23, 1981 (age 44) Hyōgo Prefecture, Japan
- Areas: Character design, writer, manga artist
- Pseudonym: Izumi Hiro (和泉 ヒロ)
- Notable works: Kaichō wa Maid-sama!
- Awards: Best Rookie – Kaeri Michi, Yuki no Netsu; Fresh Debut – Akai Yume; Outstanding Debut – Kaichō wa Maid-sama!

Hiro Fujiwara (藤原 ヒロ, Fujiwara Hiro; born December 23, 1981, in Hyōgo Prefecture) is a Japanese manga artist.

The manga artist was once active under her previous pen name, Izumi Hiro (和泉 ヒロ) at the end of the 1990s, but has abandoned the name after she won the Best Rookie award in the LMS for Kaeri Michi, Yuki no Netsu.

Her first series, Kaichō wa Maid-sama! (会長はメイド様!, translation Maid Sama!) was serialized in Hakusensha's monthly shōjo manga magazine, LaLa. This series is licensed for North America, and an anime adaptation was broadcast during Spring 2010.

== Personal life ==
Hiro Fujiwara was born on December 23, 1981, in Hyōgo Prefecture. She also has two older brothers and two cats, but is currently living alone. She said that one of her older brothers was an otaku and anonymously posted the story of his younger sister, Hiro, on the web radio of her work Kaichō wa Maid-sama! in connection with its story of the Younger Sister Day.

She normally speaks standard Japanese, but when she relaxes or lets her guard down, she speaks in a Kansai accent, in which she can hardly have control. She also states that currently, she listens to songs by Akeboshi and Rie fu, although her all-time favourite singer is Hikaru Utada. She uses background music while doing work.

She also says that being a manga artist was a dream profession when she was young. During high school, she concentrated in playing double bass. While studying literature at university, she took a gap year of 4 years to choose what she wanted to be. She started to become a manga artist after she graduated. She mentions that during her university days, she became an assistant for a manga artist and that the experience had helped her with her work now.

She seems to be friends with Yuki Fujitsuka, who authored Toremoto Beat. Fujitsuka's name came up in Kaichō wa Maid-sama!'s 5th volume during the closing credits and Fujiwara also listed her as 'Yuki-sama' in her official website. The author and Yuki Fujitsuka both won the same category in the 31st Hakusensha Athena Newcomers' Awards in year 2006.

She also mentioned that all the characters in Kaichō wa Maid-sama! are easy to draw with the exception of Usui.

According to her old website, she does original CG and manga of all genres. She has also written poems.

== Career ==
Hiro Fujiwara made her debut by winning the Best Rookie award in the 144th LaLa Mangaka Scout Course for her work Kaeri Michi, Yuki no Netsu (帰り道、雪の熱). However, this was won under her name, Hiro Izumi and it went on to be published in the April 2005 issue of LaLa DX.

She has submitted a few works to Hakusensha's other contest besides the manga artist's other attempts at the LMS and LMG. Those works are, Daiari. (だいあり。; Diary.), Kakera, Hitotsu (欠片、ひとつ), Fly and another untitled work that was going to be sent in to year 2002's LaLa Mangaka Scout Course. Diary. was sent into the 40th Big Challenge Awards but was not short-listed. She was placed 19th for Kakera, Hitotsu that was sent-in to the Hana to Yume Mangaka Course. The third work, Fly was submitted to the 27th Hakusensha Athena Newcomers' Awards and was mentioned in the 2nd issue of Hana to Yume as well as the February issue of LaLa.

Nevertheless, her second work was published six months after she won the Best Rookie award in the LaLa Mangaka Scout Course. However, it was her first work to be published under the current pen name, Hiro Fujiwara. Akai Yume (紅い夢; The Crimson Colored Dream) won the 36th LaLa Manga Grand Prix's Fresh Debut Award and was published in the November issue of LaLa DX in year 2004. In the same month, she also had another work titled Hanjuku Wolf (半熟ウルフ) serialized in LaLa Special.

In 2005, she started the year by serializing Kimi no Hidamari (君の陽だまり; Your Sunny Spot) in the March issue of LaLa DX. Three months later, she went on to publish another one-shot, Shōnen Scramble (少年スクランブル; The Young Boy's Scramble) and made her debut in LaLa DX's sister magazine, LaLa. In the November issue of LaLa DX, she published her last work of the year, Tōmei na Sekai (透明な世界; The Transparent World) which was also later compiled together into Kaichō wa Maid-sama!'s volume one.

In 2006, she made her last one-shot titled Kaichō wa Maid-sama! (会長はメイド様!; lit. Class President is a Maid!) which was published in the February issue of LaLa. She inspired in some things of Gakuen Alice of Tachibana Higuchi for do her manga, where discovered the Hakusensha editorial. However, this one-shot's popularity had made the one-shot span into a manga series which has been serialized in LaLa. It has 18 volumes published in Japan.

Besides authoring the manga, Fujiwara has also illustrated the furoku or freebies given out by the magazine as well as writing the scripts for the drama CDs.

The author had once gone to Hong Kong to attend a signing event. According to an entry at her blog, she said that this was her first overseas signing event.

In 2012, Fujiwara held a small charity auction featuring characters from her manga Kaichō wa Maid-sama! She announced on her blog that the money would aid Tohoku's earthquake reconstruction from 2011. It was the first time she offered a signed and colored illustration.

== Works ==
=== One-shots ===
- Hanjuku Wolf
- Kimi no Hidamari
- Shōnen Scramble
- Tōmei na Sekai
- Kono Mama Ja Dame Mitai Desu I Can't Stay Like This
- Kaichō wa Maid-sama!
- Kyōsō Silent - Madness Silent

=== Sent-in works ===
- Kaeri Michi, Yuki no Netsu
- Akai Yume

=== Series ===
- Kaichō wa Maid-sama! (会長はメイド様!, translation Maid Sama!)
- Yuki wa Jigoku ni Ochiru no Ka (ユキは地獄に堕ちるのか, translation Will Yuki Fall Into Hell?)

== Awards ==
- Best Rookie – 144th LaLa Manga Scout Course (LMS) for her work, Kaeri Michi, Yuki no Netsu
- Fresh Debut – 36th LaLa Manga Grand Prix (LMG) for her work, Akai Yume
- Outstanding Debut – 31st Hakusensha Athena Newcomers' Awards for her first series, Kaichō wa Maid-sama!
