= List of Maid Sama! characters =

The characters of the manga series Maid Sama! were created by Hiro Fujiwara. The story centers around Misaki Ayuzawa, the student council president of the previously all-boys high school who is particularly strict on the boys, and her relationship with her man Takumi Usui, a classmate who knows the secret that Misaki works at a maid café to support her family.

== Main characters ==
=== Misaki Ayuzawa ===
Voiced by: Sanae Kobayashi (drama CD), Ayumi Fujimura, Sumire Morohoshi (young) (anime) (Japanese); Monica Rial (English)
The titular character of the story, Misaki Ayuzawa (鮎沢 美咲, Ayuzawa Misaki) is the first female student council president at Seika High. She is a 16-year-old girl known for her extremely bossy and strict attitude towards boys, and relentless attempts to reform them to live up to what she considers are acceptable standards of behavior. Though many of the male students fear and hate her, the ones who get to know her come to see that she is actually very fair and willing to help anyone who needs it.
She eventually becomes widely respected for her good grades, her great athletic skill, and her many accomplishments as president. Her negative attitude towards males is mostly attributed to her father amassing a huge debt and then disappearing. Misaki became determined to make sure her sickly and helpless mother, Minako would not have to work so hard to support both Misaki and her younger sister, Suzuna. After her father left, she studied hard and learned martial arts and became Seika's president. To this extent, she secretly, and at first reluctantly, works as a maid-waitress at Café Maid Latte. Misaki is always driven to do her best regardless of the endeavor, and has a strong sense of justice, though she also has a tendency to be too selfless for her own good.
At Café Maid Latte, Misaki is called "Misa-chan" by her coworkers and customers. Misaki was shown being the most passionate with her job when she was dressed as a male and appealing to woman, saying she would like a guy like herself.
Despite her initial annoyance towards Usui and her belief that his interest in her stems from being the only one who knows she works as a maid-waitress, she is in love with him. However, Misaki always denies her feelings for him and becomes awkward whenever a potentially intimate moment arises between them. She eventually confesses her feelings for him and they become a couple, though secretly at Misaki's insistence to preserve her reputation as the student council president. When Usui reveals that he is to transfer to Miyabigaoka, she openly reveals their relationship to the students at Seika High, despite the potential damage it may cause to her appearance. When told that Usui would be going to England, Misaki is shocked but keeps her composure and openly accepts his choice. After Usui stops texting her from England she seeks the help of the Miyabigaoka High School President, Tora Igarashi, for a way to travel to him. The deal between the two is for Misaki to travel to see Usui, but in return she must tell Usui to not cut all ties between himself and the Walker Family; benefiting Igarashi in him being in contact of a person of noble blood such as Usui. Usui and Misaki reunite in England and return home to Japan to finish out their high school years. Later on, Misaki and Usui get engaged, and Misaki becomes a diplomat/lawyer while Usui becomes a respected doctor and they get married.

=== Takumi Usui ===
Voiced by: Tomokazu Sugita (drama CD), Nobuhiko Okamoto (anime) (Japanese); David Matranga (English)
The most popular male student in Seika High, Takumi Usui (碓氷 拓海, Usui Takumi) is a 17-year-old boy who appears to take little interest in anything and prefers to observe things as they unfold. He has blond hair, which he inherited from his mother, and is extremely handsome, so much that even a few boys at Seika High are infatuated with him solely because of that. He also inexplicably wears glasses only at home. Usui proves to be extraordinarily talented in a number of different fields (later shown to be inherited from his talented father), including cooking, the violin, chess, martial arts and table etiquette. He also gets excellent grades and is an excellent athlete (he has been shown to be very good at soccer, table tennis, baseball, volleyball and fencing). However, he reveals very few details about his past willingly. He has taken an interest in Misaki because she stands from everyone else and her hard work makes her unique. He expresses his feelings mainly by teasing her and passing perverted comments to see her funny expressions (a trait he got from his mother), and she nicknames him "perverted outer-space alien" as a running gag in the series is Misaki wondering whether Usui is even human when he comes out relatively unscathed from a fall that would mortally injure someone on spot. Usui was also the first Seika student to discover Misaki's maid secret and even though he is concerned about her risky work habits, she brushes it off as him wanting to blackmail her. As he has been in love with Misaki since the first time they met, he dislikes it and becomes jealous, though he has trouble expressing it, whenever other boys get her attention, including Shintani and Tora.
At Misaki's insistence, Usui reveals that he is an illegitimate child. His mother, a Japanese-English woman from the wealthy Walker family, had an affair with an unknown Japanese man (later revealed to be a butler of the Walker family); his mother died in childbirth. To conceal his origins, his maternal English grandfather sent Usui to live with his mother's Japanese grandmother's family, resulting in little contact with his older half-brother. Adopted by his mother's cousin, Usui's education was primarily through tutors, partially explaining his academic excellence (as shown when he checkmates the vice president of the Miyabigaoka high school chess club in very few moves). However, he became bored of the isolation and randomly selected a standard high school to attend; after enrolling in Seika High, he moved into a high-rise condo where he lives alone. During his first year at Seika, he quickly became popular among the girls, but not being interested in them, he systematically rejected them whenever they confessed to him, thus earning Misaki's resentment of him. All the boys within the school, even his classmates respect and look up to him (hence being automatically intimidated when facing him as an opponent) and refer/call him "Usui-san"; "-san" being a Japanese honorific showing light sense of respect.
Usui confesses to Misaki during the school's firework festival and they share a kiss, though the relationship does not become formalized until Misaki herself confesses her love to him. He is forced to transfer to Miyabigaoka High School for his third year of high school, though he still makes an effort to go out of his way to see Misaki every day. When in England, Usui texts Misaki every day and continues to tease her, such as by asking for the color of her underwear, until his brother takes his phone away. The event triggers Misaki's deal with Tora Igarashi so she could go to England and meet with Usui, while Usui himself struggles in his confinement by his brother and maternal grandfather, the latter of whom still disowns him for being an illegitimate child and learns more about his parents. He eventually reunites with Misaki and reveals their relationship in front of the nobility. Usui is allowed to head back to Japan only if he agrees to keep his relations with the Walker family. Despite never attaining his grandfather's approval (which is explained as him being just a stubborn old man), Usui is wed to Misaki in the Walker family's castle's church and has become a doctor for his family (to be able to cure/improve his brother's and grandfather's health; also being called a genius doctor who created a medicine).
Yuki Ochimura ni Ojou-sama!, a crossover between Maid Sama! and Yuki wa Jigoku ni Ochiru no Ka released by Hiro Fujiwara in 2016, is set 12 years after the marriage, and it is revealed that Usui and Misaki have a 10-year-old daughter called Sara and an 8-year-old son called Rui.

== Secondary characters ==
=== Seika High School ===
Hinata Shintani (深谷 陽向, Shintani Hinata)
Voiced by: Atsushi Abe, Yū Kobayashi (young) (Japanese); Santry Rush (English)
Misaki's childhood friend who comes to Seika High in search of his first love. It is revealed that Misaki is his first love; however, his feelings are unrequited. When they were children, he was an overweight boy who Misaki helped back to his feet after he fell from a tree. He fell in love with her, but soon moved away to live with his grandfather in the countryside when his parents died. When he returns, his appearance has changed considerably from losing so much weight (supposedly from eating nothing but vegetables), though he remains a glutton and loves to eat anything. He is also one of the few people who know about Misaki's part time job. He loves Misaki very much, and dislikes Usui as a rival for Misaki's affections. While Misaki does like him, her feelings toward him are platonic.
Though he admires Usui's strength and talent, Usui seems indifferent to Shintani and frequently mocks him, repetitively calling him 下役君 (pronounced as sanshita-kun, meaning "underling"). However, Usui secretly regards him as a rival for Misaki as well, particularly when Misaki and Shintani's childhood friendship is made apparent. He refuses to give up on Misaki despite being fully aware of her and Usui's feelings for each other, having resolved prior to moving that he would not let Misaki having a boyfriend deter him. Misaki's mother and sister both note that he physically resembles Misaki's father. Reacting to this, he claims that he would never abandon the people he cares about. Later, Hinata notes Usui does just that when he leaves Misaki for England.
Eventually, when he realizes that Misaki would always going to consider him only as a friend, Shintani decides to move on and takes an interest in Misaki's sister, Suzuna, who reveals her feelings for him. The two marry three years later and Shintani officially becomes a brother-in-law to both Misaki and Usui, though he still regularly fights with Usui up to their wedding ceremony.
Shōichirō Yukimura (幸村 祥一郎, Yukimura Shōichirō)
Voiced by: Hiro Shimono (drama CD), Kazuyoshi Shiibashi (anime) (Japanese); Clint Bickham (English)
The vice president of the student council, Shōichirō Yukimura tries to help Misaki where he can, and enjoys office routine. At first, he, like the rest of the student council, is fearful of Misaki, but he eventually comes to be on fairly close terms with her and Usui. He is both terrified and awed of Usui after Usui kisses him as a "reward for his hardwork", though in truth Usui had only done so to restore Misaki's confidence.
Yukimura is hardworking, earnest, and capable of doing most administrative work, but is not athletic to any extent, especially in comparison to Misaki and Usui. His gentle, almost feminine demeanor and slight stature make him appear somewhat weak, a fact he is sensitive about. As a result, a running joke in the series is that he is frequently forced to dress up as a girl. Yukimura has a younger sister named Ruri, whom he cares greatly for and becomes distressed when she rejects him for not acting prince-like. He becomes close friends with Soutarou throughout high school. He later becomes roommates with Soutarou and considers him family.
Naoya Shirakawa (白川 直也, Shirakawa Naoya)
Voiced by: Hiroyuki Yoshino (drama CD), Mitsuhiro Ichiki (anime) (Japanese); Leraldo Anzaldua (English)
A male student at Seika High School who initially dislikes Misaki because of her forceful methods of reforming Seika. He and his friends discover that she works at a maid café early on in the story, but after she is defended by Usui, they quickly become her biggest fans, as well as regulars at Cafe Maid Latte, often referred to as the "idiot trio." His nickname is "Shiroyan". In middle school, Shiroyan used to be a delinquent and was known as "White Tornado Beast". He and the rest of the idiot trio attend Misaki and Usui's wedding at the end of the series, where he reveals that he is married and has three children.
Ikuto Sarashina (更科 郁斗, Sarashina Ikuto)
Voiced by: Tetsuya Kakihara (drama CD), Takuma Terashima (anime) (Japanese); Houston Hayes (English)
The second of the "idiot trio," which includes Naoya Shirakawa and Ryuunosuke Kurosaki. A closet otaku, he is actually good at drawing manga illustrations and enjoys writing. He drew cards and pictures of the Maids for Maid Latte. His friends call him "Ikkun." He later works as a doujin illustrator.
Ryuunosuke Kurosaki (黒崎 龍之介, Kurosaki Ryūnosuke)
Voiced by: Yuichi Nakamura (drama CD), Yoshimasa Hosoya (anime) (Japanese); Corey Hartzog (English)
The third member of the "idiot trio" who frequently visit Cafe Maid Latte, nicknamed "Kurotatsu." Known for being the perverted one and likes "erotic things". He also used to be a delinquent in middle school with Shiroyan. He is dating Erika years later and lives through various part-time jobs.
Sakura Hanazono (花園 さくら, Hanazono Sakura)
Voiced by: Kana Hanazawa (Japanese); Margaret McDonald (English)
A good friend of Misaki's and one of the few female students at Seika High, Sakura is friendly and cheerful and, like the rest of the girls, relies on Misaki for protection from the wild behaviour of the boys. She is quite popular amongst the boys, but frequently rejects their confessions; in particular, she has rejected ex-rugby captain and senior Masaru Gouda two hundred times, including his final confession for her before his graduation. According to Shizuko, Sakura falls in love without carefully considering what the person is really like, as exampled by her persistent feelings for Kuuga, the two-faced, womanizing singer of the popular rock band UxMishi from a nearby high school. Her persistence pays off when Kuuga finally returns his feelings for her. They later get married with a child and another one on the way by the time of Misaki's marriage.
Shizuko Kaga (加賀 しず子, Kaga Shizuko)
Voiced by: Yū Kobayashi (Japanese); Kara Greenberg (English)
One of Misaki and Sakura’s friends, a sensible and intelligent girl who often spends lunchtime with them. She is quite the opposite of Sakura. Shizuko is a member of the flower arranging club and is good at math, but is not very good at physical activities. She has an older brother in university and a younger sister in junior high school; according to Sakura, the three of them look very alike. While she is quite reserved, she does not like it when people insults her glasses or even glasses in general. Shizuko also tends to explode when she is involved in meaningless pursuits, such as when accompanies Sakura to see the UxMishi performances which force her to stand in the crowded front, and also when she accompanies Misaki and Sakura in the latter's meeting with UxMishi that wounds up going nowhere. Eventually, Shizuko becomes an office worker in the future.
Soutarou Kano (叶 爽太郎, Kanō Sōtarō)
Voiced by: Kosuke Toriumi (Japanese); Tyler Galindo (English)
A withdrawn male student who is a year below Misaki and her peers. He is initially against Misaki as the student council president because of her aspirations of increasing the female population of Seika High. In order to sabotage her presidency, Kano tries to hypnotize Misaki, Usui, and the student council into ruining Misaki’s reputation. It is revealed that his gynophobic attitude comes from his mother abandoning his family when he was young (ironically the very opposite of what Misaki experienced) and his father warning him to be wary of women, and after failing to hypnotize Misaki, she punishes Kano by assigning him to work closely with his female classmates during the school's Open House, in hopes of forcing him to get over his fear. The punishment is ultimately successful, and Kano slowly becomes friendlier with Misaki and the rest of his female peers, as well as with Yukimura (who gives off the aura of a female, as Kano states).
Though he runs against Misaki during her re-election as President, Kano opposes using underhanded means to gain victory, remaining on good terms with her. He is the first to understand the relationship between Usui and Misaki (knowing about it before Misaki knows herself) and often wonders why they will not admit that they like each other. Kano wins the presidential election in his second year, succeeding Misaki as the student council president of Seika High. Later, he and Yukimura live together as roommates.
Masaru Gouda (剛田 将, Gōda Masaru)
Voiced by: Manabu Sakamaki (Japanese); Johnny Delacerda (English)
An ex-rugby captain who is a year above Misaki and her peers. He is the elector for the student council election that Misaki and Kano participate in. He is in love with Sakura, but she has apparently rejected him 200 times, up to and including his final confession on his graduation from Seika High.
Kenji Sawa (沢 賢二, Sawa Kenji)
Voiced by: Hideki Nakanishi (Japanese); Anthony Hunter, Luke Patterson (English)
The treasurer of the student council. He is also a friend of Usui. He easily gets teary-eyed whenever he loses his accounting book.
Bunta Kosugi (小杉 文太, Kosugi Bunta)
Voiced by: Fumihiro Okabayashi (Japanese); Matt Hune (English)
The secretary of the student council who wears glasses. He has a calm personality.
Takashi Hagimoto (萩本 崇, Hagimoto Takashi)
Voiced by: Takashi Ōhara (Japanese); Greg Ayres (English)
The head of broadcasting of the student council. He is also the announcer of the sports festival that the school holds. He is a close friend of Yuudai.
Yuudai Utsumi (宇津見 遊大, Utsumi Yuudai)
Voiced by: Kazuyuki Okitsu (Japanese); Ned Gayle (English)
A member of the student council and a friend of Takashi. He takes care of the school's environment and is often seen tending flowers.
Kiyomasa Katada (堅田 清正, Katada Kiyomasa)
Voiced by: Koichi Bando (Japanese); Luke Patterson (English)
A member of the student council who is tasked of keeping the school's discipline. He wears glasses.
Nijita Hayase (早瀬 虹太, Hayase Nijita)
Voiced by: Manabu Sakamaki (Japanese); Jack Ivy (English)
A member of the student council tasked with healthcare. He is very meticulous.
Chinatsu Aramaki (荒牧 千夏, Aramaki Chinatsu)
Voiced by: Takuya Kuriyama (Japanese); Luke Patterson (English)
The head of sports of the student council. He has short gray hair.
Eita Yoshino (芳野 詠太, Yoshino Eita)
Voiced by: Yūki Ono
The head of culture of the student council.
Hideki Suzuki (鈴木 秀樹, Suzuki Hideki)
A 17-year-old boy who becomes acquainted with Shizuko during a school trip. He also wears glasses like her.
Maria Miyazono (宮園 マリア, Miyazono Maria)
A young and attractive English teacher at Seika High. She may have non-Japanese ancestry because of her name and the comments on her looks. She is an acquaintance of Tora Igarashi who made her join Seika High in order to make Usui quit. Wearing revealing clothes as well as having a large bust and being very short, Miyazono attracts the attention of male teachers and students; due to this, Misaki instinctively protects her from them. Initially thought of by Misaki as a potential rival for Usui when she starts to realize her feelings for Usui, Miyazono is actually a lesbian and never considers the feelings of the men she attracts; instead, because of Misaki's attitude to her, she is in love with her. Her acquaintance with Usui is also because Miyazono's mother once tutored him. She eventually abandons her goal of persuading Usui to drop out after she sees just how attached he is to Misaki.

=== Ayuzawa House ===
Minako Ayuzawa (鮎沢 美奈子, Ayuzawa Minako)
Voiced by: Ayako Kawasumi (Japanese); Emily Neves (English)
Misaki's mother. Misaki shares a strong bond with her and loves her deeply. She appears to be somewhat sickly, but does her best to support Misaki and Suzuna by working as a nurse at the hospital. Although she is grateful that Misaki is helping her with their financial problems, she also wants nothing more than for Misaki to have more fun and go out more often as a high school teenager. She becomes acquainted with Usui at the train station and sees him as a very gentle person and the exact opposite of her husband. Usui has stated that she is open minded.
Suzuna Ayuzawa (鮎沢 紗奈, Ayuzawa Suzuna)
Voiced by: Kaori Ishihara (Japanese); Jad Saxton (English)
Misaki's younger sister. She is very apathetic and shows little to no emotion, though is actually rather perceptive and known for her deadpan humour. She does not work at any part time jobs and appears to be in middle school. Suzuna has a friendly relationship with Shintani, whom she recalls from when he and Misaki were childhood friends. In the anime, she often enters magazine contests and always seems to win food prizes. Suzuna later attends Seika High as a freshman student. While she is instantly popular with the male population, most of the boys are wary of her being Misaki's sister and they fear that her easy-going personality is a ruse. It is also shown (particularly during her first few days at Seika High) that Suzuna has a deepening affection towards Hinata. She eventually marries Shintani Hinata.
Sakuya Ayuzawa (鮎沢 咲也, Ayuzawa Sakuya)
Misaki and Suzuna's absentee father. He left his wife and daughters with tremendous debt, which is the primary source of Misaki's initially deep resentment towards men. Little is known about him at first, though Misaki's mother notes that Hinata's personality reminds her of her husband, despite Hinata's vehement denial of the comparison. He later appears as a new cook at Café Maid Latte and proves to be an excellent chef with a bright and cheery personality reminiscent of Hinata. Sakuya's circumstances before being hired are unknown, aside from the fact that he apparently had been abroad. However, he takes pains to avoid Misaki and Suzuna until Suzuna recognizes his cooking and he forces himself to reveal his identity as their father. It is revealed that Minako had lied about the lazy gambling father they imprinted in her daughter's minds and in reality, Sakuya shouldered his friend's debt and left to go find him. But when he found him, he found out that he started his own family and couldn't return to Japan. In attempting to try to make up to his daughters, he spent many nights wandering and sleeping in the streets before making it to the Maid Latte. Since he returned, Misaki and Suzuna welcome their father back but do not forgive him completely, forcing him to continue living in the streets and working part time at Maid Latte. While he feels that he is not allowed to interfere with his daughter's affairs, Sakuya ultimately gives his blessing for Usui's proposal to Misaki.

=== Maid Latte ===
Satsuki Hyoudou (兵藤 さつき, Hyōdō Satsuki)
Voiced by: Rie Tanaka (drama CD), Aki Toyosaki (anime) (Japanese); Julia Krohn (English)
The manager of Maid Latte and Misaki’s boss; a 30-year-old woman who has a tendency to voice out her fantasies. She is a cheerful woman who enjoys her job because it allows her to make others happy. She is very understanding of Misaki’s circumstances, knowing that Misaki does not particularly enjoy working at a maid café, and is perceptive of other people’s feelings. Satsuki also ends up hiring Usui as a part-time cook, much to Misaki’s chagrin.
Honoka (ほのか)
Voiced by: Kana Asumi (Japanese); Jennifer Gilbert (English)
A 20-year-old employee at Maid Latte. She can become somewhat maniacal about getting in character for her job and criticizes Misaki for her initial resistance to acting parts outside of her comfort range, as well as for being ashamed of working at Maid Latte and hiding it from her peers. Also when Honoka is asked to describe what she feels and thinks about Misaki, she says "hate, because her good work is making her look bad." She also has a habit of turning evil, which the Maid Latte members call Black Honoka (黒ほのか, Kuro Honoka). Later she becomes the manager of a maid cocktail bar. She is also dating Aoi.
Erika (エリカ)
Voiced by: Mariya Ise (Japanese); Kasi Hollowell (English)
A 19-year-old college student working at Maid Latte. She notes that Misaki is strong and picks up work quickly, and claims that it does not feel like Misaki is younger than her. She has a tendency to eavesdrop and is described as having a "voice fetish." Among all of the Maid Latte maids, she is often described as the "sexy" one and has the largest breasts. Years later, she is working under Honoka at her cocktail bar and is dating Kurotatsu.
Subaru (すばる)
Voiced by: Kana Ueda (Japanese); Juliet Simmons (English)
A 22-year-old employee at Maid Latte. Like Honoka, she does not have a full-time job and makes a living from part-time work. She considers Misaki to be hard working. Subaru can be distinguished by her glasses. She becomes an office worker and frequently visits Honoka and Erika's cocktail bar.
Sayu (さゆ) and Gon (ゴンちゃん, Gon-chan)
Voiced by: Harumi Sakurai and Yuko Gibu (Japanese); Lainee Hooks and Emily Neves (English)
Two other employees at Maid Latte. Sayu is 18 and Gon-chan is 20 years old. Sayu was a participant in the Vivo Royal Beach volleyball match, but lost before she had a chance to play against Misaki. They do not appear often.
Sen (センちゃん) and Mochi (もっち)
Voiced by: Yu Kobayashi and Kana Hanazawa (Japanese); Kara Greenberg and Margaret McDonald (English)
The two kitchen staff at Maid Latte.
Aoi Hyoudou (兵藤 葵, Hyōdō Aoi)
Voiced by: Yuki Kaida (drama CD), Hiromi Igarashi (anime) (Japanese); Luci Christian (English)
Satsuki’s nephew, the son of Satsuki's older brother, and student of Seisen Middle School who enjoys cross-dressing. He likes "cute things" and being the center of attention, not unlike a young girl. His androgynous features allow him to pass off as a girl and his female persona is well known as a cute Internet idol. Aoi enjoys toying with the feelings of men (trying to do so to Usui but failing because Usui apparently knew he was male from the beginning), but is eventually exposed as a boy by Misaki. He is generally short-tempered, has little patience and has frequent mood swings, usually after doing something kind or showing affection for someone and suddenly becoming angry afterward.
Misaki is under the impression that he hates her; he frequently scolds her for her poor fashion sense and unfeminine strength. He later yells at Misaki for not being more decisive about her relationship with Usui and for leading Shintani on, even if she was doing it unintentionally. It is this scolding that eventually pushes her admit to Shintani that she does in fact have feelings for Usui. Even so, Aoi develops a crush on Misaki, though he did not confess because he could see she loves Usui. He enjoys making Misaki dresses, and puts much more effort into her outfits than others. Aoi eventually becomes UxMishi's clothing designer later on and works in Europe. He is also dating Honoka.
Nagisa Hyoudou (兵藤 なぎさ, Hyōdō Nagisa)
Voiced by: Sanae Kobayashi (Japanese); Beth Lazarou (English)
Satsuki’s younger sister and Aoi's aunt. Nagisa is the manager of a beach house known as "Ocean House." Nagisa is deeply tanned and is said to be an amazing beach volleyball player. She asks for Satsuki and her employees to come and work at her beach house during the summer since her shop is not as popular as she would like. Nagisa is somewhat tough on Aoi for trying to dress like a girl because her older brother sent Aoi to her beach house to become more masculine.

=== UxMishi ===
Kuuga Sakurai (桜井 空我, Sakurai Kūga)
Voiced by: Kenji Nojima (Japanese); Blake Shepard (English)
Vocalist of the rock band UxMishi. While he seems sweet and kind to his fans, in reality he is very arrogant, rude and insensitive to others' feelings. It is due to his attitude that Misaki dislikes him, as he is very insensitive to Sakura's feelings while hitting on Misaki herself. He appears to develop some genuine feelings towards Sakura because she is the only one who earnestly cares for him, expressing jealousy towards Usui and becoming annoyed by the fact that Sakura seems happy being with Usui and Misaki during a day trip to hot springs on his birthday. He does not understand why Misaki was fine with Usui being alone with Sakura, having thought that Misaki and Usui were a couple.
Sakura and Kuuga later got married and had two children, while UxMishi continued as a very popular band around the world.
Shousei Nikaidou (二階堂 匠生, Nikaidō Shousei)
Voiced by: Yūki Ono (Japanese); Unknown (English)
Guitarist of the rock band UxMishi, known as "Shou". Shou does not express himself that much.
Kouma Yafu (藪 煌真, Yafu Kōma)
Voiced by: Kazuyuki Okitsu (Japanese); Jack Ivy (English)
Bassist of the rock band UxMishi, nicknamed "Kou". Kou is very respectful and always scolds Kuuga's rude behavior.
Yuujirou Ono (小野 裕次郎, Ono Yūjirō)
Voiced by: Hideki Nakanishi (Japanese); Luke Patterson (English)
Drummer of the rock band UxMishi.

=== Miyabigaoka High School ===
Tora Igarashi (五十嵐 虎, Igarashi Tora)
Voiced by: Kenichi Suzumura (Japanese); Andrew Love (English)
The Student Council President at Miyabigaoka High School, he initially appears as a gentleman who marvels at Misaki and the changes she has brought to Seika High, offering her a chance to come to Miyabigaoka with an exceptional loan. He is quickly revealed to be a lecherous young man who has become bored with the women surrounding him, who are easily submissive because of his wealth. He tries to bribe Misaki. He enjoys causing drama around him and he thinks that money can buy anything. Misaki's strong will and outright rejection of his monetary bribe to have her join the Miyabigaoka Student Council captures his interest. It is later revealed that Tora has some ties to or knowledge of Usui's past or background, which he may be exploiting to some unknown end. Aware of the nature of Usui and Misaki's relationship, he continues to surprise Misaki and expresses an interest in how she will react to the confusing and manipulative way he speaks to her. Tora eventually reveals that he loves Misaki and even forcefully kisses her when the two are returning to Japan from visiting Usui in England, which visibly upsets Usui. Tora seems to be on good terms with both Misaki and Usui at the end of the series, as he takes them rather playfully from their wedding ceremony for honeymoon using his own private helicopter. He had a fiance named Chiyo who he initially had no feelings for and only remained engaged to her for the benefit of the Igarashi company. However, he later falls in love with her after finding her stubborn side to be pretty interesting and they eventually marry ten years later.
Kanade Maki (真木 奏, Maki Kanade)
Voiced by: Tomoaki Maeno (Japanese); Jack Ivy (English)
The Vice President of the Student Council at Miyabigaoka High, he and Igarashi attempt to buy out Maid Latte and change it into a butler café. Misaki and Usui are able to prevent him from realizing his plans through a competition. In the end, he realizes that Maid Latte is different from other cafés. He later visits Maid Latte again, saying that he wanted to observe how the business is going and how the employees serve their customers. However, he secretly tries to warn Misaki about a new obstacle that she would soon encounter: Usui being forcefully transferred to Miyabigaoka High.
Hirofumi Koganei (小金井 博文, Koganei Hirofumi)
Voiced by: Fumihiro Okabayashi (Japanese); Kyle Colby Jones (English)
A bespectacled student at Miyabigaoka High School who looks down upon Seika High students. After he insulted Tamaizawa and Ishida, two Seika High students, for taking an interest in chess, they hit him and Misaki forces them to go with her to apologize to him. When she discovers the reason why they attacked Koganei, she demands that Koganei apologize to her students as well. He agrees, only on the condition that they defeat him in chess, which Usui does with no trouble despite Koganei ranking fourth in the nation as a chess player. He was originally intended to be the president of Miyabigaoka High School Council by the author, but rejected by the editor.
Kaon Umekouji (梅小路 華音, Umekōji Kaon)
A girl who carries around a large teddy bear made by her mother. Though Kaon expresses an arrogant and cruelly playful streak towards those she looks down on, her attempt to upset Misaki by lying about being Usui's fiancée abruptly grows awry when Misaki dismisses it and mockingly pities her by listing all of Usui's negative traits.
Tomu Umekouji (梅小路 斗夢, Umekōji Tomu)
Kaon's older brother. He is always seen wearing headphones around his neck.
Ichitarou Tomikouji (トミ浩二 一太郎, Tomikōji Ichitarō)
A childhood friend of the Umekouji siblings.
Li Yi-Hua (李 毅華, Ri Ri-Hwa)
The daughter of a Hong Kong billionaire, Li Yi-Hua is a beautiful young woman who does some work as a model. She actually was not very beautiful when she was younger, but after being engaged to Arashiyama, he transformed her into the stunning young woman she is now and she enjoys telling others that she exemplifies the peak of Arashiyama's abilities.
Tenryuu Arashiyama (嵐山 天竜, Arashiyama Tenryū)
Li's fiance, a young man who is obsessed with beauty. When he was engaged to Li, he was so upset by her appearance that he transformed her into a beautiful girl. She takes his obsession in stride, and does not express any jealousy when he sees other girls and insists on trying to make them beautiful as well, since Li considers herself the finest transformation Arashiyama has achieved.

=== Walker Family ===
Gerald Walker (ジェラルド・ウォーカー, Jerarudo Wōkā)
Gerald is Takumi's older half-brother, a successful businessman who bears a resemblance to Takumi, save the difference in their hair color and eye shape. He despises Takumi not only because Takumi is an illegitimate child but because Gerald blames him for their mother's death, and also because Gerald believes their mother loved Takumi more than him. However, he expresses an interest in Takumi's activities in Japan and arranges for his bodyguard Cedric to spy on his brother. His talents appear to be the polar opposite of Takumi's, which includes being unskilled at cooking. Though he appears devious and calculating, he is strangely jovial and enjoys teasing Cedric, similar to how Takumi makes fun of his acquaintances. It is hinted that Gerald is extremely sick with an unknown illness, which he presumably inherited from his mother.
Patricia Walker (パトリシア・ウォーカー, Patorisha Wōkā)
Takumi and Gerald's mother. She is half-English from her father's side and half-Japanese from her mother's side. Her maternal family includes a grandmother and a cousin, both of whom her youngest son, Usui, lived with at some point in his life. It seems that both her sons inherited her personality. Takumi resembles her and has her hair color. She has a weak body, which Gerard inherited from her. Her marriage to Edward was arranged, and although she grew to love him, she fell in love with Yuu. When she became ill, she began an affair with Yuu, which ended when she became pregnant. She died giving birth to Takumi.
Edward Walker (エドワード・ウォーカー, Edowādo Wōkā)
Gerald's father. He is a naive and cheerful man. His marriage to Patricia was arranged, but he loves her dearly. He still loves her despite her affair with Yuu and Takumi's birth. Unlike other members of the Walker family, he seems to hold no grudge towards Takumi.
Yuu Hirose (広瀬 ゆう, Hirose Yū)
Takumi's father. Takumi resembles him more than his mother. He is a former butler who arrived in Britain from Japan to personally serve Patricia. He eventually fell in love with her, but tried to suppress his feelings after her marriage to Edward. After she became ill, he comforted her and they began an affair. Before Takumi was born, the Walker family forced him to leave. His fate is unknown throughout the series until the series finale, in which Yuu secretly attends his son's wedding with Misaki, being very proud of him.
Cedric Morris (セドリック・モリス, Sedorikku Morisu)
Gerald's bodyguard, an attractive man with skills on par with Usui or better, as shown when he chases Misaki and Usui at full sprint and does not sweat a drop. He is extremely persistent and devoted to fulfilling Gerard's orders, no matter how ridiculous (he wore a ninja outfit and only said "Nin-Nin" to Gerald's request). Despite being assigned to spy on Usui, he is not very inconspicuous and frequently called out of hiding when Usui or others point out where he is. He openly dislikes and threatens Misaki, in part because he does not want her to associate with Usui and the Walker family and because he believes that maids and butlers are dedicated servants to the distinguished, unlike the pseudo-maids at Maid Latte. Though he understands Misaki's situation, Cedric feels that someone like Misaki is not suited for someone like Usui. However, he was taken aback by the resemblance on how Gerald treats him as Usui treats Misaki.
Gilbert Morris (ギルバート・モリス, Girubāto Morisu)
Cedric's father and Gerald's grandfather's butler. He is also the head butler of the Walker family. Gilbert knew Takumi's father (though not by name) and revealed his secret to Takumi that he was a butler, also giving him his mother's diary to read.
Duke Rachester (ラチェスター公爵, Rachesutā Kōshaku)
Patricia's father and Takumi and Gerald's maternal grandfather. He is very old and as a result is confined to bed most of the time. He disowns Takumi due to his status as an illegitimate child and banishes the latter's father, Yuu, who had impregnated his daughter, from ever stepping on his domain again. The duke still has not recognized Takumi by the end of the series, even when the latter becomes a doctor for him and the Walker family.

=== Other characters ===
Ruri Yukimura (幸村 るり, Yukimura Ruri)
Voiced by: Yui Ogura (Japanese); Emily Neves (English)
Shōichirō Yukimura's 7-year-old younger sister who is currently a first grader. She does not respect her brother at all, for not being a "prince" that she desires, even lying to her friends by not recognizing Shouchirou when he crosses paths with her at a street. She holds a precocious crush on Usui since meeting him, considering him as the prince she has been looking for. At Misaki and Shōichirō's behest, Usui becomes Ruri's prince for a whole day. When Ruri discovers the plot, she lashes out at her brother for manipulating her, though he in turn snaps and scolds her for putting her interests beyond what she already has. The two mend their relationship afterward.
Gouki Aratake (荒嶽 剛毅, Aratake Gōki)
Voiced by: Tetsuya Kakihara (Japanese); Blake Shepard (English)
The strongest delinquent in Seisen Middle School, he is an old friend and underling of Shirokawa and Kurosaki. He used to be a pushover and a bit of a crybaby. He was saved by Shirokawa and Kurosaki once when he was being bullied, and immediately started looking up to them after that. Constantly seeking to become stronger, he keeps his delinquent ways even after the two have graduated and retired from delinquency. He later kidnaps Yukimura, who was dressed like a girl and who he mistook as Shirokawa's girlfriend, and challenged the idiot trio to a fight elsewhere. Coincidentally, he and Aoi happen to attend the same middle school.
