= Maid Sama! =

Japanese manga series by Hiro Fujiwara

- First tankōbon volume cover, featuring Takumi Usui (left) and Misaki Ayuzawa (right)

会長はメイド様! (Kaichō wa Maid-sama!)
- Genre: Romantic comedy
- Manga
- Written by: Hiro Fujiwara
- Published by: Hakusensha
- English publisher: NA: Tokyopop (former); Viz Media
- Imprint: Hana to Yume Comics
- Magazine: LaLa
- Original run: December 24, 2005 – September 24, 2013
- Volumes: 18 + 1 extra
- Anime television series
- Directed by: Hiroaki Sakurai
- Produced by: Akio Matsuda
- Written by: Mamiko Ikeda
- Music by: Wataru Maeguchi
- Studio: J.C.Staff
- Licensed by: NA: Sentai Filmworks; UK: MVM Entertainment
- Original network: TBS
- English network: NA: Anime Network; SEA: Animax Asia
- Original run: April 2, 2010 – September 24, 2010
- Episodes: 26 + 1 OVA
- icon

Maid Sama! (Japanese: 会長はメイド様!, Hepburn: Kaichō wa Meido-sama!; lit. 'The Class President Is a Maid!') is a Japanese manga series by Hiro Fujiwara. First published as a one-shot in Hakusensha's shōjo manga magazine LaLa in December 2005, the manga was serialized in the same magazine from April 2006 to September 2013; its chapters were collected in 18 tankōbon volumes. Tokyopop first licensed the manga for an English-language release in North America, releasing the first eight volumes from April 2009 to March 2011. Viz Media later licensed the series, releasing it in nine 2-in-1 volumes from August 2015 to November 2017.

A 26-episode anime adaptation produced by J.C.Staff aired from April to September 2010. The series was licensed in North America by Sentai Filmworks.

== Plot ==
Once an all-boys high school, Seika High, infamous for its rowdy students, has recently become a co-ed school. However, with the female population remaining a minority even after the change over the recent years, Misaki Ayuzawa works hard to make the school a better place for girls. She puts a lot of effort into academics and athletics and earns the trust of the teachers. Eventually, she becomes the first female student council president. Misaki has gained a reputation among the male student body as a strict boy-hating demon dictator and as a shining hope for the teachers and fellow female students. Despite her reputation, however, Misaki secretly works part-time at a maid café to support her mother and younger sister by returning the huge debt their father had left them.

Misaki's secret is soon discovered by Takumi Usui, a popular boy at Seika High. Instead of exposing it to the school, though, Usui keeps it for himself and even becomes a regular customer at the café, much to Misaki's chagrin. Known for being a genius in pretty much everything from academics to athletics and for having rejected numerous confessions of his female peers, Usui takes a liking to Misaki because he finds her 'interesting'. After going through various awkward situations, including being confronted by a forgotten childhood friend of hers, Misaki falls in love with Usui, who reciprocates, and the two soon become a couple. However, their relationship is troubled by Usui's difficult familial past coming back to haunt him. Being an illegitimate child of a wealthy English noble family, Usui technically cannot form a relationship with anyone not in his social standing, Misaki included. Misaki has to see Usui being forced to transfer to a prestigious rival school Miabigaoka, and then away from Japan completely when his family takes him back to England. Nevertheless, they graduate, and ten years later, Usui and Misaki eventually marry.

== Media ==
=== Manga ===
Written and illustrated by Hiro Fujiwara, Maid Sama! was first published as one-shot in Hakusensha's shōjo manga magazine LaLa on December 24, 2005; (Note: It was published in the magazine's February 2006 issue, released on December 24, 2005.) it was later serialized in the magazine from April 24, 2006, to September 24, 2013. Hakusensha collected its 85 individual chapters in 18 tankōbon volumes, released between September 5, 2006, and February 5, 2014.

At its Anime Expo panel in July 2008, North American publisher Tokyopop announced that it had licensed the manga; the publisher only released the first eight volumes from April 7, 2009, to March 8, 2011. Viz Media re-licensed the series and published it in nine 2-in-1 volumes from August 4, 2015, to August 1, 2017.

A special spin-off one-shot, titled "Tora no Maki" (虎の巻; lit. 'Volume of Tora'), was published in LaLa Fantasy on November 8, 2013. A crossover one-shot chapter with Fujiwara's Yuki wa Jigoku ni Ochiru no ka manga series was published in LaLa on December 24, 2016. Two special chapters were respectively published in LaLa DX on February 10 and August 10, 2017. Another special chapter was published in LaLa on April 24, 2018. An extra volume, titled Maid Sama! Marriage (会長はメイド様！マリアージュ, Kaichō wa Maid-sama! Mariāju), which contains a total of seven chapters, including the previously published ones, was released on August 3, 2019. A special chapter was published in LaLa DX on February 5, 2025. Another special chapter was published in LaLa on July 24, 2026.

==== Volumes ====
No.	Original release date	Original ISBN	English release date	English ISBN
1	September 5, 2006	978-4-592-18431-7	April 7, 2009 (Tokyopop); August 4, 2015 (Viz Media)	978-1-4278-1403-6; 978-1-4215-8130-9
1. "The Student Council President Is a Maid!"; 2. "A Maid Even At The School Festival"; 3. "Misaki M and two S's"; 4. "Misaki shishou"
2	February 5, 2007	978-4-592-18432-4	August 11, 2009 (Tokyopop); August 4, 2015 (Viz Media)	978-1-4278-1404-3; 978-1-4215-8130-9
5. "Miyabigaoka chess match"; 6. "Misa-chan as a boy"; 7. "Igarashi Tora"; 8. "Misa Chan and Igarashi Tora"; 9. "Sports Festival part 1"
3	August 4, 2007	978-4-592-18433-1	January 12, 2010 (Tokyopop); November 3, 2015 (Viz Media)	978-1-4278-1405-0; 978-1-4215-8131-6
10. "Sports Festival part 2"; 11. "What colour Is Misaki? Natural colour?"; 12. "Little Sister Day?!!!"; 13. "Net idol Aoi"; 14. "Side Story"; 15. "Class 1-7 Soutaru Kanou"
4	December 5, 2007	978-4-592-18434-8	April 13, 2010 (Tokyopop); November 3, 2015 (Viz Media)	978-1-4278-1406-7; 978-1-4215-8131-6
16. "Maid Latte Even At The Beach House"; 17. "School Visitation Association and a Glasses Rabbit"; 18. "Maid Latte in the beach Party!"; 19. "Usui becomes an enemy!"; 19.1. "Side Story – And so, Momotarou became Maid-sama too!"; 19.2. "Side Story – The 3 idiots become Maid-samas, too!"
5	May 2, 2008	978-4-592-18435-5	July 13, 2010 (Tokyopop); February 2, 2016 (Viz Media)	978-1-4278-1689-4; 978-1-4215-8132-3
20. "Sakura's Love Is the Indies"; 21. ^name not yet uploaded^; 22. ^name not yet uploaded^; 23. ^name not yet uploaded^; 24. "First Time Visit to Usui's... House?"
6	September 5, 2008	978-4-592-18686-1	October 12, 2010 (Tokyopop); February 2, 2016 (Viz Media)	978-1-4278-1690-0; 978-1-4215-8132-3
25. ^name not yet uploaded^ ("President makes onigiri"); 26. "The Transfer Student, Shintani Hinata, Appear"; 27. "Outdoor School Camp Part 1"; 28. "Outdoor School Camp Part 2"; 28.1. "Special Chapter – "Blue Spring"; 28.2. "Side Story – Vice-President Is a Prince!?"
7	April 3, 2009	978-4-592-18687-8	December 7, 2010 (Tokyopop); May 3, 2016 (Viz Media)	978-1-4278-1819-5; 978-1-4215-8133-0
29. "The Eating Contest"; 30. "Sensei, Misaki-chan Is in Deep Trouble!!"; 31. "The Secret Girls Talk"; 32. "Do You Want To Devote Yourself To Me?"; 32.1. "Side Story – Aoi and His Happy Friends"
8	September 4, 2009	978-4-592-18688-5	March 8, 2011 (Tokyopop); May 3, 2016 (Viz Media)	978-1-4278-1820-1; 978-1-4215-8133-0
33. "Enter the World of the Witch Maid"; 34. "The Things that He Wishes for, Is Always, Always Just that One Thing"; 35. "The Message between His Eyes"; 36. "Seika High's student council Is in a big pinch...!?"; 36.1. "Side Story – Idiot and Delinquent and Hero"; 36.2. "Side Story – A Certain Morning in the Student Council Room"
9	April 5, 2010	978-4-592-18689-2	May 31, 2011 (Tokyopop, cancelled); August 2, 2016 (Viz Media)	978-1-4278-0519-5; 978-1-4215-8134-7
37. "Gather Up!! All the Shining Stars of Seika High!!"; 38. "The Battle of The Election Is In Its Climax!!"; 39. "Usui's Resolve.....?"; 40. "Charge Towards The Bursting Affection of Love And The Dazling Color of Summer"; 41. "Master's Big News!!!"
10	June 4, 2010	978-4-592-19180-3	September 20, 2011 (Tokyopop, cancelled); August 2, 2016 (Viz Media)	978-1-4278-3163-7; 978-1-4215-8134-7
42. "The Guy Who Holds The Keys To All Secrets....!?"; 43. "Teacher...!!"; 44. "A Confession to Misaki?!"; 45. "Lightning Speed!! First Maria-Sensei, and Next Her Fiance!?"; 46. "The Master, Reveals His Secret, To The Maid"
11	August 5, 2010	978-4-592-19181-0	December 27, 2011 (Tokyopop, cancelled); November 1, 2016 (Viz Media)	978-1-4278-3258-0; 978-1-4215-8135-4
47. "A One-Day Trip To The Hot Spring part 1"; 48. "Maid-sama Spring"; 49. "Phantasmagoric"; 50. "An Invitation from President Igarashi"; 50.1. "Side Story – Our Student Council President Is a Butler!"; 50.2. "Good Morning, I am the Younger Sister"
12	February 4, 2011	978-4-592-19182-7	November 1, 2016	978-1-4215-8135-4
51. "Two Usui's"; 52. "Under The Ominous Watch of an English Spy"; 53. "A Secret Battle Plan With Master...?!"; 54. "A Meeting Between Ninja and Maid"; 55. "You Can't Deceive My Eyes!"; 55.1. "Side Story: Sentimental Ikkun"
13	August 5, 2011	978-4-592-19183-4	February 7, 2017	978-1-4215-8136-1
56. "A Maid Christmas! + A Date at a Theme Park!"; 57. "The Confession"; 58. "Maid Latte loves the Reborned Couple!"; 59. "Demon --> Lover!? (Tsundere)"; 60. "Day One:School trip !!"; 060.1. "Maid Latte's Backyard"
14	February 3, 2012	978-4-592-19184-1	February 7, 2017	978-1-4215-8136-1
61. "Boys Forbidden, Girls Talk"; 62. "Compatible"; 63. "This Maid Is Deeply Engrossed in Love, Master!"; 64. "Goodbye....Usui"; 65. "Confronting the new student!? The strongest president in top form!"
15	July 6, 2012	978-4-592-19185-8	May 2, 2017	978-1-4215-8137-8
66. "Formidable!? Usui's peer"; 67. "Usui's Grand Birthday"; 68. "The Ayuzawa Sisters"; 69. "Very Popular Secret Campus Battle"; 70. "Secret Campus Battle: The Best Popularity"; 070.5 "The Idiot, the Delinquent and the Madonna"
16	February 5, 2013	978-4-592-19186-5	May 2, 2017	978-1-4215-8137-8
71. "Welcome Back to the Bustling Maid Latte!"; 72. "The Cinderella Before Midnight"; 73. "The Master Is heading to Britain?"; 74. "I will go to Britain"; 75. "The Master and the Maid, Overcoming the Distance, Their Thoughts Meet..."
17	August 5, 2013	978-4-592-19187-2	August 1, 2017	978-1-4215-8138-5
76. "Master, Do You Wish To Be Stepped on by Me So Much?"; 77. "The School's Super Popular Secret Battle Is going smoothly"; 78. "To Britain!"; 79. "Finally, the Two of Us Can Meet In Person"; 80. "Two Masters and a Maid"
18	February 5, 2014	978-4-592-19188-9	August 1, 2017	978-1-4215-8138-5
81. "Closer, Farther So Close That We Can't Get Any Closer Than This Closer!?"; 82. "A Secret Between The Close Sisters!?"; 83. "There are Times when Men must Fight... and so Do the Women"; 84. "The Calculations of the Feelings of Love!"; 85. "The Strongest Maid on Campus!"

=== Anime ===
An anime television series adaptation was announced in August 2009. The series was animated by J.C.Staff and directed by Hiroaki Sakurai, with series composition handled by Mamiko Ikeda, character designs by Yuki Imoto and music composed by Wataru Maeguchi. The series was broadcast on TBS from April 2 to September 24, 2010. (Note: TBS listed the series air dates on Thursday at 25:55, effectively Friday at 1:55 a.m. JST.) The opening theme song is "My Secret", performed by Saaya Mizuno, while the first ending theme song, "Yokan" (予感; lit. 'A Premonition'), and the second ending theme song, "∞ Loop" (∞ループ, Mugendai Rūpu), are both performed by Heidi.

In North America, the series was streamed by the Anime Network starting on June 15, 2010. Sentai Filmworks released the series in two DVD sets, in Japanese audio with English subtitles, on June 7 and August 2, 2011. A complete collection on DVD was released on October 9, 2012. The series was re-released on DVD and Blu-ray sets with an English dub on January 27, 2015. In the United Kingdom, the series was licensed by MVM Films, releasing the series on two DVD sets on November 16 and December 7, 2015. A complete collection volume was released on Blu-ray Disc and DVD sets in April 2016. In Southeast Asia, the series was broadcast on Animax Asia.

=== Drama CDs ===
A drama CD, titled Goshujin-sama Anime-ka desu yo! Drama CD (ご主人様アニメ化ですよ！ドラマCD), was released on March 24, 2010, bundled with the May issue of LaLa. Another drama CD, Maid Sama! Marriage (会長はメイド様！マリアージュ, Kaichō wa Maid-sama! Mariāju), was bundled with the special edition of the 2018 extra manga volume, released on August 3 of that same year.

== Reception ==
Connie C. of Pop Culture Shock characterized the manga as "pretty entertaining, if shallow", and considered it mildly sexist, though sufficiently lighthearted that it did not cause serious offense; she indicated that she would continue reading it as a "guilty pleasure." Deb Aoki of About.com observed that the maid café setting served both as a source of fanservice and as a means of critiquing gender roles. Johanna Draper Carlson of Comics Worth Reading, by contrast, viewed the narrative as "a male fantasy, where the scary, strong, smart, self-possessed girl turns out to secretly be subservient to men", adding that it was amusing only until one considered its underlying messages. Robert Harris of Mania.com acknowledged the formulaic opening but considered the characters to be the series' strength. Leroy Douresseaux of ComicBookBin found the character Takumi unconvincing, describing him as a "cheap plot trick" deployed to rescue Misaki when necessary. Carlo Santos of Anime News Network deemed the premise "otaku-tastic" but appreciated the restraint shown in the maid café scenes, which lacked fanservice and panty shots. He also praised the chemistry between the leads and the humor, though he noted the stereotypical plot and criticized the layouts and the characters' verbosity. Connie C. remarked that the second volume reminded her that plot devices are effective "if used right", and felt that the humor and character interactions elevated the otherwise conventional school sports day and new-classmate storylines.

In a 2019 Forbes article on the best anime of the 2010s, Lauren Orsini named it one of the five best anime of 2010, writing that its "clever comedy with snappy delivery" had kept it sharp even a decade later.
