= Tachibana Higuchi =

Japanese manga artist (born 1976)

Tachibana Higuchi 樋口 橘
- Born: March 16, 1976 (age 50) Kyoto, Japan
- Areas: Writing scripts and art
- Notable works: Gakuen Alice; Portrait of M & N Champignon no Majo

Tachibana Higuchi (樋口 橘, Higuchi Tachibana; born March 16, 1976) is a Japanese manga artist known for her works of Gakuen Alice and Portrait of M & N.

In year 1996, she first made her professional debut in Bessatsu Hana to Yume's 5th issue, entitled 5 Gatsu no Sakura (5月のサクラ; The Cherry Blossoms of May).

With an interview with Tokyopop she gave a detailed look on how she started as a manga artist:

I first submitted a manga story a while after I graduated from high school. Up until then I was studying for the entrance examinations for the Art University, and as part of that, I sometimes drew manga and four-panel strip comics for fun.

Because I was conscious of the fact that I had started drawing manga in earnest at a later age, I think my progress during the beginning on drawing and storytelling techniques was fast as I frantically tried to absorb everything I could learn about creating manga. After the serialization of the story began, as I got busy, I was so desperate to submit it on time that I feel that the drawings probably haven’t improved much compared to before.

During the serialization of the manga, I think my story telling techniques improved more as I concerned myself with how to catch the attention of the readers, how well one can incorporate what the readers are seeking into the story.

Her current completed work is Gakuen Alice.

== Works ==
- Swan Lake (1999, Hakusensha)
- Portrait of M & N (2000–2002, serialized in Hana to Yume, Hakusensha)
- Gakuen Alice (学園アリス, Gakuen Arisu) (2003-2013, serialized in Hana to Yume, Hakusensha)
  - Kageki No Kuni No Alice (Alice in the Country of the Opera) (2016-2017, Hana To Yume) (3 volumes)
- Letter (手紙, tegami) (2014, Hakusensha)
- Anne no Magomago Tosho Land (アンのマゴマゴ図書之国, An no magomago tosho rando) (2014, to be serialized in Hana to Yume, Hakusensha)(3 volumes)
- Champignon no Majo (シャンピニオンの魔女, Shanpinion no Majo) (2019-ongoing, serialized in Manga Park, Hakusensha)
