= Gakuen Alice =

Japanese manga series

- Cover of the first volume, featuring Sakura Mikan

学園アリス (Gakuen Arisu)
- Genre: Supernatural; comedy
- Manga
- Written by: Tachibana Higuchi
- Published by: Hakusensha
- English publisher: NA: Tokyopop
- Magazine: Hana to Yume
- Original run: February 19, 2003 – June 20, 2013
- Volumes: 31
- Anime television series
- Directed by: Takahiro Omori
- Produced by: Eizou Kondou; Atsuhiro Iwakami; Nobuyuki Suga; Takashi Sakuma
- Written by: Masashi Yokoyama
- Music by: Makoto Yoshimori
- Studio: Group TAC
- Licensed by: NA: Nozomi Entertainment
- Original network: NHK BS-2
- Original run: October 30, 2004 – May 14, 2005
- Episodes: 26
- Video game

Gakuen Alice ~Doki Doki Fushigi Taiken~
- Developer: Kids Station
- Publisher: Kids Station
- Genre: Adventure
- Platform: Game Boy Advance
- Released: November 18, 2004
- Video game

Gakuen Alice ~Kira Kira Memory Kiss~
- Developer: Kids Station
- Publisher: Kids Station
- Genre: Adventure
- Platform: PlayStation 2
- Released: February 10, 2006
- Video game

Gakuen Alice: Waku Waku Happy Friends
- Developer: Kids Station
- Publisher: Kids Station
- Genre: Adventure
- Platform: Nintendo DS
- Released: April 19, 2007

Gakuen Alice (Japanese: 学園アリス, Hepburn: Gakuen Arisu), also known as Alice Academy or Alice School, is a Japanese manga series written and illustrated by Tachibana Higuchi, serialized in the shōjo manga magazine Hana to Yume from issue 19 of 2002 to issue 14 of 2013. It was adapted into an anime series produced by Aniplex and Group TAC which originally premiered on NHK BS-2. It spanned twenty-six episodes that aired between October 30, 2004, and May 14, 2005. The anime was translated and dubbed into English by the anime television network Animax and broadcast on networks throughout Asia. At Anime Expo 2008, The Right Stuf International announced that its Nozomi Entertainment division had licensed Gakuen Alice for the North American market.

In 2015, a spin-off called Kageki no Kuni no Alice (歌劇の国のアリス), was started. It takes place a few months after the end of Gakuen Alice, and features a new set of characters. The plot follows Andou Hikari, who is searching for her brother, who was taken away when she was a child because he had an Alice. She eventually takes advantage of a once in a lifetime opportunity, for normal people to join an Alice music academy, hoping to find her brother. Since its release, Gakuen Alice has gained cult hit status and is considered by critics to be one of the best in the magical girl genre.

== Plot ==
Mikan Sakura grew up with her grandfather in the Japanese countryside. When her best friend, Hotaru Imai, transfers to a prestigious school in Tokyo, Mikan follows her. The school is actually an elite Academy for gifted people with "Alices", an ability that is unique depending on the individual being. Once Mikan arrives at the gates of the school, she encounters an Alice teacher named Narumi, gets enrolled due to a series of events, and is told that she possesses a rare Alice. Despite her initial view of the so-called greatness to the school, Mikan slowly discovers that beneath the grand facade of the Academy, there is a never-ending stream of lies and buried secrets. The school's increasingly manipulative and sinister actions towards her make it a dangerous place to be. Little does Mikan know that her enrollment in Alice Academy set the gears in motion to an even greater tragedy. As she discovers the reality of the "Alices", she also unfolds her heritage and how it is connected to the academy. As the mystery of the academy draws her into an endless pit of misery and series of trials to survive, she also discovers how the strength of friendship is important to her and guides her to her destiny.

== Media ==
=== Manga ===
Written and illustrated by Tachibana Higuchi, the chapters of Gakuen Alice were published in the Japanese shoujo manga anthology Hana to Yume by Hakusensha and were collected in 31 tankōbon volumes.

Gakuen Alice was licensed for an English-language release in North America by Tokyopop before the company shut down. Sixteen volumes were published. This title is currently available to be licensed.

The manga is also licensed for a Spanish and German-language release.

=== Anime ===
A 26-episode anime television series directed by Takahiro Omori aired from October 20, 2004, to May 14, 2005.

The series uses two pieces of theme music. The opening theme, "Pikapika no Taiyou" (Shining Sun), is performed by Kana Ueda, the protagonist's voice actress. The ending theme, "Shiawase no Niji" (Rainbow of Happiness), is performed by Kana Ueda and Rie Kugimiya.

The entire series was released as a five DVD Japanese language only set in North America on July 7, 2009.

=== Fanbooks ===
The cover art of the official illustrated fan book

An official fanbook (Volume 7.5) was published in March 2005. Data in the first official fanbook is accurate up to Volume 7 of the series. A special fanbook titled Gakuen Alice SP Fanbook released as a furoku in Hana to Yume magazine. A second official fanbook (Volume 25.5) was published in September 2011. Data in the second fanbook is accurate up to Volume 25 of the series. An official illustrated fan book (artbook) was released in May 2007. Another illustrated book (ehon) was released in October 2011.

=== CDs ===
A soundtrack for the series was released on March 2, 2005. A single of the opening theme and ending theme were also released.

Three drama CDs were broadcast on a web radio. On January 18, 2006, Sony Music Entertainment released the first drama CD.

=== Video games ===
Gakuen Alice ~Kira Kira Memory Kiss~ was released on June 22, 2006, for the PlayStation 2 in Japan. There is also a Game Boy Advance game that has also only been released in Japan called Gakuen Alice ~Doki Doki Fushigi Taiken~. On April 19, 2007, a Nintendo DS game called Gakuen Alice: Waku Waku Happy Friends was released in Japan.

== Reception ==
Gakuen Alice has garnered both critical and commercial success, selling over 7 million copies in print as of 2013, and being listed as "Top 10 Romance Manga" in 2002 by Ani List. Throughout its run, critics have considered Gakuen Alice as one of the best in its genre.

The website Top Tens ranked the manga as #5 in its list of "Top 10 Best Shoujo Mangas". Gabriela Delgado of Comic Book Resources called the anime series potentially as a "classic of the magical girl genre", further stating that it is a "magical girl anime like no other" and adding that it "slowly transcended from a lighthearted and whimsical slice-of-life series, into a plot-heavy manga that kept readers at the edge of their seats with every new episode".

Sahil Khan of Otaku's Notes listed the manga at #9 in her list of "Top 20 Best Shoujo Manga Of All Time", while Laura from Heart of Manga listed it at #4 in the list of "Top 10 Out of Print Shoujo Manga". In another article, Laura praised the manga, saying, "I haven't gotten into maho shojo characters this much since Cardcaptor Sakura. Mikan and Natsume have made my all time favorite couples list. I urge you not to dismiss it if you aren't hooked by the first volume. The exposition of characters takes a while, and the story really starts to get deeper as the books continue."
