= List of Yona of the Dawn volumes =

The Japanese manga series Yona of the Dawn is written and illustrated by Mizuho Kusanagi. Kusanagi began serializing the manga in Hakusensha's Hana to Yume shōjo manga magazine on August 4, 2009. It ended serialization on December 19, 2025. Hakusensha collected its chapters in 48 individual tankōbon volumes, released from January 19, 2010, to October 20, 2026.

The story follows Yona, a princess of the fictional kingdom of Kohka. She is forced to go on the run with her friend and bodyguard Son Hak when her childhood friend Su-won murders her father and takes the throne.

Viz Media announced their license to the series during their panel at New York Comic Con on October 9, 2015. The first volume was released on August 2, 2016.

An original anime DVD adapting two bonus chapters from the twelfth volume was included in a limited edition of the manga's nineteenth volume on September 18, 2015. Two more OADs were included with the twenty-first and twenty second volumes of the manga on August 19, 2016, and December 20, 2016, respectively.

== Volumes ==
No.	Original release date	Original ISBN	English release date	English ISBN
1	January 19, 2010	978-4-592-19081-3	August 2, 2016	978-1-4215-8781-3
1. "Princess Yona" (皇女ヨナ, Ōjo Yona); 2. "Shattered Bonds" (ちぎれた絆, Chigireta Kizuna); 3. "Hidden Strength" (うしろ手の強さ, Ushirode no Tsuyosa); 4. "Distant Skies" (遠い空, Tōi Sora); 5. "Just Breathing" (ただ息をしているだけ, Tada Iki o Shiteiru Dake)
2	May 19, 2010	978-4-592-19082-0	October 4, 2016	978-1-4215-8783-7
6. "The Wind Tribe" (風の部族, Kaze no Buzoku); 7. "The Spear in My Heart" (心におさめた槍, Kokoro ni Osameta Yari); 8. "It's My Decision" (自分で決めた, Jibun de Kimeta); 9. "Roar" (咆哮, Hōkō); 10. "Crimson Hair" (紅い髪, Akai Kami); 11. "Accession of the New King" (新王即位, Shin Ō Sokui)
3	September 17, 2010	978-4-592-19083-7	December 6, 2016	978-1-4215-8784-4
12. "The Valley That the Voice of God Calls" (神の声が呼ぶ谷, Kami no Koe ga Yobu Tani); 13. "Fate" (天命, Tenmei); 14. "The Chosen Door" (選んだ扉, Eranda Tobira); 15. "Wavering Determination" (ふるえる覚悟, Furueru Kakugo); 16. "The Hidden Village of the Dragon" (龍の隠れ里, Ryū no Kakurezato); 17. "At Long Last" (待望, Taibō)
4	January 19, 2011	978-4-592-19084-4	February 7, 2017	978-1-4215-8785-1
18. "The Dragon's Claws" (龍の爪, Ryū no Tsume); 19. "This Way and That" (あちらへこちらへ, Achira e Kochira e); 20. "The Tunnel Dwellers" (あなぐらの民, Anagura no Tami); 21. "The Blindfolded Dragon" (目隠しの龍, Mekakushi no Ryū); 22. "Calling to Each Other" (呼びあう, Yobiau); 23. "Echoes of Fear" (反響する恐怖, Hankyō Suru Kyōfu)
5	May 19, 2011	978-4-592-19085-1	April 4, 2017	978-1-4215-8786-8
24. "Light" (光, Hikari); 25. "A Name is Given" (呼び名, Yobina); 26. "To a New Land" (新たな地へ, Arata na Chi e); 27. "The Third Dragon" (三人目の龍, Sanninme no Ryū); 28. "Pirates of Awa" (阿波の海賊, Awa no Kaizoku); 29. "Ties" (縁, Enishi)
6	September 20, 2011	978-4-592-19086-8	June 6, 2017	978-1-4215-8787-5
30. "Negotiation" (交渉, Kōshō); 31. "The Senju Herb Test" (千樹草の試し, Senjusō no Tameshi); 32. "Connection" (繋がり, Tsunagari); 33. "Preparing for War" (戦支度, Ikusajitaku); 34. "Chain of Courage" (勇気の連鎖, Yūki no Rensa); 35. "Sweet-Scented Cargo" (馨しい積荷, Kaguwashii Tsumini)
7	November 18, 2011	978-4-592-19087-5	August 1, 2017	978-1-4215-8788-2
36. "A Spark of Light" (火花, Hibana); 37. "History Is Made at Night" (歴史は夜作られる, Rekishi wa Yoru Tsukurareru); 38. "The Night of the Banquet" (宴の夜に, Utage no Yoru ni); 39. "The Menacing Clouds of Dawn" (曉雲は暗く, Gyōun wa Kuraku); 40. "The Morning of the Vow" (誓いの朝, Chikai no Asa); 41. "Dragon, Human or Both?" (龍であり人であり, Ryū deari Hito deari)
8	March 19, 2012	978-4-592-19088-2	October 3, 2017	978-1-4215-8789-9
42. "All Together" (皆さん おそろいで, Minasan Osoroi de); 43. "From Here On" (これから, Kore Kara); 44. "People's Expectations" (それぞれの思惑, Sorezore no Omowaku); 45. "War Games" (戦ごっこ, Ikusa Gokko); 46. "Paving the Way" (地ならし, Jinarashi); 47. "A Welcome Rain" (甘雨, Kan'u)
9	July 20, 2012 (regular edition); July 20, 2012 (limited edition)	978-4-592-19089-9; 978-4-592-10551-0	December 5, 2017	978-1-4215-8790-5
48. "Looking Bad" (悪目立ち, Warumedachi); 49. "The Dark Dragon and the Happy Hungry Bunch" (暗黒龍と ゆかいな腹ヘリ達, Ankoku Ryū to Yukai na Haraheritachi); 50. "Release" (解放, Kaihō); 51. "Losing Yourself" (忘我の境, Bōga no Sakai); 52. "An Arrow Piercing a Stone" (右に立っ失, Migi ni Tasshitsu); 53. "Lord Tae-jun's Death Wish" (逝きたがりのテジュン様, Yukitagari no Tejun-sama)
10	December 20, 2012	978-4-592-19090-5	February 6, 2018	978-1-4215-8791-2
54. "Can This Be Real?" (幻でしようか, Maboroshi de Shiyou ka); 55. "Like a Dream" (夢のようで, Yume no Yō de); 56. "Fire Cannot Extinguish Fire" (火で火は消えぬ, Hi de Hi wa Kienu); 57. "Ignorance Precludes Thoughtfulness" (人は知らないことは考えられない, Hito wa Shiranai Koto wa Kangaerarenai); 58. "Courageous and Cowardly" (意気地と弱虫, Ikuji to Yowamushi); 59. "You Are My Wish" (あなたは私の祈り, Anata wa Watashi no Inori)
11	April 19, 2013	978-4-592-19691-4	April 3, 2018	978-1-4215-8792-9
60. "Wind in the Young Leaves, Part 1" (若葉風 前編, Wakaba Kaze Zenpen); 61. "Wind in the Young Leaves, Part 2" (若葉風 後編, Wakaba Kaze Kōhen); 62. "Before the Blade Strikes" (その刃が届く前に, Sono Yaiba ga Todoku Mae ni); 63. "Swaying Journey" (ゆれる道中, Yureru Dōchū); 64. "Senri Village, Sen Province, Kai Empire" (戒帝国 千州千里村, Kai Teikoku Senshū Senri-mura); 65. "The Fire-Quelling Festival Begins" (火鎮の祭始まる, Kachin no Matsuri Hajimaru)
12	August 20, 2013	978-4-592-19692-1	June 5, 2018	978-1-4215-8793-6
66. "There Is No Smoke Where There Is Fire" (火の無い所に煙は立たぬ, Hi no Nai Tokoro ni Kemuri wa Tatanu); 67. "The Hand of Fire" (火の手, Hinote); 68. "The Protectors of Fire" (火の守り手たち, Hi no Mamoritetachi); 69. "An Omen of a Great Fire" (大火の兆し, Taika no Kizashi); 70. "A Crimson Delusion" (真赤な妄執, Makka na Mōshū); "Upon His Back" (その背には, Sono Sei ni wa); "Kija" (キジヤ, Kijiya)
13	December 20, 2013	978-4-592-19693-8	August 7, 2018	978-1-4215-8794-3
71. "Mandate from Heaven" (天の采配, Ama no Saihai); 72. "The One Who Leads" (導く者, Michibiku Mono); 73. "Dreams of the King in the Wilderness" (荒野で王の夢を見た, Kōya de Ō no Yume o Mita); 74. "A Flower Blooming in Your Footprint" (きみの靴跡に咲く花, Kimi no Kutsuato ni Saku Hana); 75. "Three Conditions" (三つの条件, Mittsu no Jōken); 76. "Drifters' Market" (流れ者の市場, Nagaremono no Ichiba); "Thunder Beast" (雷獣, Raijū)
14	April 18, 2014	978-4-592-19694-5	October 2, 2018	978-1-4215-8796-7
77. "A Town Sinking in Drizzling Rain" (霧雨に沈む町, Kirisame ni Shizumu Machi); 78. "Nadai, the Lurking Poison of Shisen" (四(シ)泉(セン)を蝕むナダイ, Shisen o Mushibamu Nadai); 79. "Just Watching" (ただ見ているだけ, Tada Miteiru Dake); 80. "Getting Involved" (渦中, Kachū); 81. "A Bottomless Spiral" (底の見えない渦, Soko no Mienai Uzu); 82. "A Vow of Indomitability to Her Sword" (その剣に不屈を誓う, Sono Tsurugi ni Fukutsu o Chikau)
15	September 19, 2014 (regular edition); September 19, 2014 (limited edition)	978-4-592-19695-2; 978-4-592-10556-5	December 4, 2018	978-1-4215-8797-4
83. "The Sound of Unseen Tears" (見えない涙の音がする, Mienai Namida no Oto ga suru); 84. "Parting Ways" (ここでお別れ, Koko de o Wakare); 85. "To Sensui" (仙水へ, Sensui e); 86. "Shaped by Those We Meet" (出会いは人を創る, Deai wa Hito o Tsukuru); 87. "Pursuit" (追撃, Tsuigeki); 88. "Eyes the Color of the Same Sea" (その瞳は同じ海の色, Sono Hitomi wa Onaji Umi no Iro)
16	December 19, 2014	978-4-592-19696-9	February 4, 2019	978-1-4215-8798-1
89. "A Faceless Ally" (顔の見えない味方, Kao no Mienai Mikata); 90. "The Focus of His Rage" (怒りの矛先は, Ikari no Hokosaki wa); 91. "He Was a Beloved Friend" (彼はとても大切な友人だった, Kare wa Totemo Taisetsu na Yūjin datta); 92. "Searching the Skies for That Smile" (空にあの笑顔をさがす, Sora ni Ano Egao o Sagasu); 93. "Please Be Careful" (どうか気をつけて, Dōka Ki o Tsukete); 94. "Time Doesn't Stop Moving" (時代は止まらない, Jidai wa Tomaranai)
17	March 20, 2015	978-4-592-19697-6	April 2, 2019	978-1-4215-8799-8
95. "The Boy from Another Nation" (他国の少年, Takoku no Shōnen); 96. "Black Cloud" (黒雲, Kurokumo); 97. "Searching for Answers" (答えを探して旅をする, Kotae o Sagashite Tabi o Suru); 98. "Run Away" (逃げろ, Nigero); 99. "The Battle Never Ends" (闘いが終わらない, Tatakai ga Owaranai); "Fly Away" (飛べ, Tobe)
18	June 19, 2015	978-4-592-19698-3	June 4, 2019	978-1-4215-8800-1
100. "A Body That Cannot Be Injured" (傷つかない体, Kizutsukanai Karada); 101. "The First Dragons" (はじまりの龍, Hajimari no Ryū); 102. "The Children of God" (神さまの子供たち, Kamisama no Kodomotachi); 103. "My Lord Sleeps" (我が君眠りて, Wagakimi Nemurite); 104. "A Small Boat That Goes Nowhere" (どこにも着かない小舟, Doko ni mo Tsukanai Kobune); 105. "The Crimson Star Rises" (あかい星が昇る, Akai Hoshi ga Noboru); "We Apologize For Our Carelessness" (不行きな点はお詫び致します, Fuyuki na Ten wa Owabi Itashimasu)
19	September 18, 2015 (regular edition); September 18, 2015 (limited edition)	978-4-592-19699-0; 978-4-592-10512-1	August 6, 2019	978-1-4215-8801-8
106. "The Blue Forest, Part 1" (青くなる森 前編, Aokunaru Mori Zenpen); 107. "The Blue Forest, Part 2" (青くなる森 中編, Aokunaru Mori Chūhen); 108. "The Blue Forest, Part 3" (青くなる森 後編, Aokunaru Mori Kōhen); 109. "Around and Around" (めぐりめぐって, Meguri Megutte); 110. "A Small Gift" (小さな贈り物, Chiisana Okurimono); 111. "The Town Where People Vanish" (人が消える町, Hito ga Kieru Machi); "Sleep Well Tonight" (今日はおやすみ, Kyō wa Oyasumi)
20	March 18, 2016 (regular edition); March 18, 2016 (limited edition)	978-4-592-21510-3; 978-4-592-21802-9	October 1, 2019	978-1-4215-9220-6
112. "Gathered at the Fort" (寄せ集めの砦, Yoseatsume no Toride); 113. "Fight" (闘え, Tatakae); 114. "Can I Tell Them Someday?" (いつか言えるだろうか, Itsuka Ieru Darō ka); 115. "Strategy Meeting" (作戦会議, Sakusen Kaigi); 116. "Enemies and Allies" (敵は味方は, Teki wa Mikata wa); 117. "I Swore an Oath to Myself" (この胸に誓った, Kono Mune ni Chikatta)
21	August 19, 2016 (regular edition); August 19, 2016 (limited edition)	978-4-592-21511-0; 978-4-592-10515-2	December 3, 2019	978-1-4215-9381-4
118. "Going Toward You" (君のもとへ, Kimi no Moto e); 119. "Kushibi's Fort" (クシビの砦, Kushibi no Toride); 120. "Reaching You" (とどけ, Todoke); 121. "Since That Day" (あの日から, Ano hi Kara); 122. "By Your Side" (あなたのそばに, Anata no Soba ni); 123. "Inexpressible Feelings" (言えない気持ち, Ienai Kimochi); "From Good Morning to Good Night" (おけようから おやすみまで, Okeyou kara Oyasumi Made)
22	December 20, 2016 (regular edition); December 20, 2016 (limited edition)	978-4-592-21512-7; 978-4-592-10516-9	February 4, 2020	978-1-9747-1108-6
124. "Thank You for Coming" (来てくれてありがとう, Kitekurete Arigatō); 125. "The Thing I Dreamed Of" (夢みたものは, Yume Mitamono wa); 126. "Pursuers" (追う者たち, Ou-mono-tachi); 127. "The Princess of Xing" (真国の姫君, Shinkoku no Himegimi); 128. "Opposition" (対立, Tairitsu); 129. "Sneak Attack" (奇襲, Kishū)
23	April 20, 2017 (regular edition); April 20, 2017 (limited edition)	978-4-592-21513-4; 978-4-592-10572-5	April 7, 2020	978-1-9747-1250-2
130. "Monsters from a Neighboring Country" (隣国の化物, Ringoku no Bakemono); 131. "The Fierce Ruler" (修羅の王, Shura no Ō); 132. "The Five Stars" (五星, Gosei); 133. "Proof" (証, Akashi); 134. "The Path that Brought Us Here" (来た道を, Kita Michi o); "A Year Ends, Another Begins" (ゆく年 くる年, Yuku Toshi Kuru Toshi); "Take Care" (お大事に, Odaijini)
24	August 18, 2017	978-4-592-21514-1	June 2, 2020	978-1-9747-1251-9
135. "A Familiar Face" (懐かしい顔, Natsukashī Kao); 136. "A Message" (言伝て, Kotodzute); 137. "To My Allies" (協力者たちへ, Kyōryoku-sha-tachi e); 138. "Confusion" (攪乱, Kakuran); 139. "Down in the Mud" (泥濘の中を, Nukarumi no Naka o); 140. "An Encounter" (遭遇, Sōgū)
25	December 20, 2017	978-4-592-21515-8	August 4, 2020	978-1-9747-1252-6
141. "Authority" (威, I); 142. "The Gathering Wave" (集結する波, Shūketsu Suru Nami); 143. "I Will Not Be Moved" (この身は不撓, Kono Mi wa Futō); 144. "Anger" (怒り, Ikari); 145. "What Is Correct?" (何が正しくて, Nani ga Tadashikute); 146. "Justice as a Convenient Excuse" (都合に合わせた正義を盾に, Tsugō ni Awaseta Seigi o Tate ni); "Take Care, Part 2" (お大事に その2, Odaijini Sono 2)
26	April 20, 2018	978-4-592-21516-5	October 6, 2020	978-1-9747-1521-3
147. "Awe" (畏怖, Ifu); 148. "O Light, Don't Go Out" (光よ消えないで, Hikari yo Kienaide); 149. "Gods" (神様, Kami-sama); 150. "Resolution" (決着, Kecchaku); 151. "A Side of You I've Never Seen" (知らないあなた, Shiranai Anata); 152. "I Care About Many Things" (大事なものはひとつじゃないけど, Daijina Mono wa Hitotsu Janaikedo)
27	August 20, 2018	978-4-592-21517-2	December 1, 2020	978-1-9747-1522-0
153. "A Rare Sunny Day" (たまの晴れの日, Tama no Hare no Hi); 154. "Concerns" (心配事, Shinpaigoto); 155. "Truth from Lies" (嘘から出た真, Uso kara Deta Makoto); 156. "There's No Way I'm Losing It" (失ってなるものか, Ushinatte Naru Mono ka); 157. "A Longing Not Easily Abandoned" (捨てきれぬ憧れ, Sute Kirenu Akogare); "The Intertribe Martial Arts Tournament (Just This Once)" (部族対抗武術大会ー今回限りー, Buzoku Taikō Bujutsu Taikai ーKonkai Kagiriー); "Take Care, Part 3" (お大事に その3, Odaijini Sono 3)
28	November 20, 2018	978-4-592-21518-9	February 2, 2021	978-1-9747-1736-1
158. "Rumors" (流説, Rusetsu); 159. "Tae-jun's Carelessness" (テジュンの不用意, Tejun no Fuyōi); 160. "Keishuk from Above" (上からケイシュク, Ue kara Keishuku); 161. "Lady Igni Is Not Amused" (イグ二様だって面白くない, Iguni-sama Datte Omoshirokunai); 162. "A Bargain" (駆け引き, Kakehiki); 163. "Lend Me a Hand" (手を貸して, Te o Kashite)
29	April 19, 2019	978-4-592-21519-6	April 6, 2021	978-1-9747-1737-8
164. "Their Objective" (狙いは, Nerai wa); 165. "In the Enemy's Hands" (敵陣, Tekijin); 166. "Military Strength" (戦力, Senryoku); 167. "Too Heavy a Burden" (背負いきれない程の, Seoi Kirenai Hodo no); 168. "The Most Powerful Decoy" (最強の囮, Saikyō no Otori); 169. "A Quick-Witted Duo" (才器ふたり, Saiki Futari)
30	August 20, 2019	978-4-592-21520-2; 978-4-592-10613-5 (limited edition)	June 1, 2021	978-1-9747-1738-5
170. "The Front Lines" (最前線, Saizensen); 171. "I Want To See You" (逢いたい, Aitai); 172. "Revitalized" (起死回生, Kishi Kaisei); 173. "I'm Taking Her Back" (返してもらう, Kaeshite Morau); 174. "Right There" (すぐそこに, Sugu Soko ni); 175. "I Called Out To You In My Dreams Countless Times" (夢で何度も呼んでいた, Yume de Nando mo Yonde Ita)
31	December 20, 2019	978-4-592-22311-5	August 3, 2021	978-1-9747-2008-8
176. "Did You Hear Me?" (聞こえた？, Kikoeta?); 177. "I Heard You, But..." (聞こえましたけど, Kikoemashita kedo); 178. "Offered a Proposal" (提案の形で問われた立場, Teian no Katachi de Towareta Tachiba); 179. "Hollow Cheering" (虚しい歓声, Munashī Kansei); 180. "Presenting the Dragons" (御披露目, Ohirome); 181. "The Opening Battle" (開幕戦, Kaimakusen)
32	April 20, 2020	978-4-592-22312-2	October 5, 2021	978-1-9747-2009-5
182. "Drastic Measures" (劇薬, Gekiyaku); 183. "The Final Act" (終幕, Shūmaku); 184. "Different View" (違う景色, Chigau Keshiki); 185. "Nostalgia" (冀求, Kikyū); 186. "I Must Face This" (向き合わなくては, Mukiawanakute wa); 187. "A Secret Matter" (秘密の, Himitsu no)
33	August 20, 2020	978-4-592-22313-9	December 7, 2021	978-1-9747-2299-0
188. "Watchful Eyes" (追う瞳, Ou Hitomi); 189. "The Crimson Dragon King" (緋龍王, Hi Ryūō); 190. "Ancestral Bloodline" (始祖の血族, Shiso no Ketsuzoku); 191. "Yon-hi's Journal" (ヨンヒの追憶, Yonhi no Tsuioku); 191.5. Ienikaeru Mae ni Ocha o Nomimashou (家に帰る前にお茶を飲みましょう); 192. "The Palace That Echoes with the Voice of God" (神の声が響く城, Kami no Koe ga Hibiku Shiro); "Someday, Somewhere at Sea" (いつかどこかの海で, Itsuka Doko ka no Umi de)
34	December 18, 2020	978-4-592-22314-6; 978-4-592-22779-3 (limited edition)	February 1, 2022	978-1-9747-2536-6
193. "The Cost of Special Treatment" (お気に入りになることの代償, Okiniiri ni Naru Koto no Daishō); 194. "The Tenacity of Red Blood" (赤い血への執着, Akai Chi e no Shūchaku); 195. "Final Wish" (最後の願い, Saigo no negai); 196. "Make the Thieves Share the Pain of Their Victims" (苦しんだ痛み、苦しんだ人たち, Kurushinda Itami, Kurushinda Hito-tachi); 197. "Shaky Handwriting" (震える文字, Furueru Moji); 198. "A Member of the Royal Family" (王室の一員, Ōshitsu no Ichiin)
35	April 20, 2021	978-4-592-22315-3; 978-4-592-22784-7 (limited edition)	April 5, 2022	978-1-9747-2841-1
199. "A VIP from South Kai" (南戒の要人, Minami Kai no Yōjin); 200. "Now or Never" (待った無し, Matta Nashi); 201. "The Shadow" (翳り, Kageri); 202. "A Venomous Guest" (毒のある客, Doku no Aru Kyaku); 203. "The Illusion of Dispossession" (奪われたという錯覚, Ubawareta to iu Sakkaku); 204. "One-Sided Affection" (一方的な親愛, Ippō-tekina Shinai); 204.5 Akatsuki no Yona-san (あかつきのよなさん)
36	August 19, 2021	978-4-592-22316-0	June 7, 2022	978-1-9747-3207-4
205. "A Cry in the Night" (夜の哭き声, Yoru no Naki-goe); 206. "Discarding Things One by One" (捨てられるものをひとつずつ, Sute Rareru Mono o Hitotsu Zutsu); 207. "This Side" (綻び, Hokorobi); 208. "Afraid of Never Waking Up" (目覚めぬ眠りを恐れて, Mezamenu Nemuri o Osorete); 209. "A Secret Order" (密命, Mitsumei); 210. "A Grave Injury" (致命傷, Chimeishō); "A Spring Party" (春の宴, Haru no Kemono)
37	December 20, 2021	978-4-592-22317-7	October 4, 2022	978-1-9747-3435-1
211. "This Is My Nature" (これが性分, Kore ga Shōbun); 212. "Yun Goes to Awa" (ユン阿波へ, Yun Awa e); 213. "A Dazzling Warrior" (眩い一騎, Mabayui Kazuki); 214. "Worth Risking Your Life for" (命を懸ける価値, Inochiwokakeru Kachi); 215. "The Destruction of Kin Province" (金州崩し, Kin-shū Kuzushi); 216. "Overflowing" (溢れる, Afureru)
38	May 20, 2022	978-4-592-22318-4	March 7, 2023	978-1-9747-3678-2
217. "A Tightly Sealed Lid" (固く閉じた蓋, Kataku tojita Futa); 218. "A Horn to Begin the Battle" (開戦の角笛, Kaisen no Tsunobue); 219. "Human Weapons" (人間兵器, Ningen Heiki); 220. "Destroy It" (打っ壊せ, Ukkowase); 221. "Your Heart's Destination" (ただ心が向かう場所, Tada Kokoro ga Mukau Basho); 222. "The Day We Stood Shoulder to Shoulder" (肩を並べた日, Kata o Narabeta hi)
39	September 20, 2022	978-4-592-22319-1	August 1, 2023	978-1-9747-3900-4
223. "The Moment to Put Everything on the Line" (全てを懸けてもいいと思えた, Subete o Kakete mo ī to Omoeta); 224. "Beyond the Limit" (限界を超えて, Genkai o Koete); 225. "Exhale" (息を吐く, Ikiwohaku); 226. "A Tender Daybreak" (やさしい夜明け, Yasashī Yoake); 227. "Lurking Under the Cover of Darkness" (夜陰に蠢(うごめ)く, Yain ni Ugome ku); 228. "Desertion" (離叛, Rihan); "Bonus Chapter: Once Upon a Time, in a Land Far Away" (昔々あるところに, Mukashimukashi aru Tokoro ni)
40	January 20, 2023	978-4-592-22320-7	December 5, 2023	978-1-9747-4116-8
229. "My Possession" (我が物, Waga Mono); 230. "The Poison Takes Effect" (毒がまわる, Doku ga Mawaru); 231. "A Dream of Fire" (燃える夢, Moeru Yume); 232. "Close to Making a Dream Come True" (正夢に近づく, Masayume ni Chikazuku); 233. "Taking the Offensive" (打って出る, Uttederu); 234. "Nothing Ventured, Nothing Gained" (虎穴虎子(こけつこし), Koketsukoshi)
41	May 19, 2023	978-4-592-22461-7	May 7, 2024	978-1-9747-4572-2
235. "Comrades Through Thick and Thin" (苦楽を共にした仲間, Kuraku o Tomoni Shita Nakama); 236. "The Relic" (遺物, Ibutsu); 237. "Toward the Call" (呼ばれる方へ, Yoba Reru Kata e); 238. "The Ruler of This Place" (場の支配者, Ba no Shihaisha); 239. "The Will and Reason to Fight" (戦う意志 闘う意味, Tatakau Ishi Tatakau Imi); 240. "No" (否, Ina)
42	October 20, 2023	978-4-592-22469-3	September 3, 2024	978-1-9747-4891-4
241. "If I Were Born in Another Land" (生まれた場所が違ったら, Umareta Basho ga Chigattara); 242. "The Vanishing Dragon" (消えた龍, Kieta Ryū); 243. "A Night for Farewells" (別れを告げる夜, Wakare o Tsugeru Yoru); 244. "A Silent Departure" (静かな出発, Shizukana Shuppatsu); 245. "It Begins" (始まった, Hajimatta); 246. "I Can Go No Further" (この先はもう行けない, Konosaki wa mō Ikenai)
43	February 20, 2024	978-4-592-22474-7	February 4, 2025	978-1-9747-5201-0
247. "A Dim Light" (おぼろげな光, Oboro-gena Hikari); 248. "Pursuing a Blue Shadow" (青い影を追って, Aoi Kage o Otte); 249. "Tie Him Down" (繋ぎ止めて, Tsunagi Tomete); 250. "To the Place Where Sadness Ends" (悲しみが終わる場所へ, Kanashimi ga Owaru Basho e); 251. "Divided" (分断, Bundan); 252. "Even If Things Don't Go Back to How They Were Before" (たとえ元には戻れなくとも, Tatoe Moto ni wa Modorenakutomo)
44	June 20, 2024	978-4-592-22488-4	June 3, 2025	978-1-9747-5574-5
253. "Comrades Never Called by Name" (名前を呼ばない仲間, Namae o Yobanai Nakama); 254. "If We Are Never to Meet Again" (もう会えないとしたら, Mō aenai to Shitara); 255. "What Did We Last Talk About?" (最後に話したことはなんだっけ, Saigo ni Hanashita Koto wa Nanda kke); 256. "One Who Clings to Life, One Who Prays for Death" (生きたいと願う者 死にたいと祈る者, Ikitai to Negau Mono Shinitai to Inoru Mono); 257. "Burning in My Heart" (胸に灯る, Mune ni Tomoru)
45	December 20, 2024	978-4-592-22512-6	December 9, 2025	978-1-9747-5909-5
258. "We've Lost Too Much" (私たちは失いすぎた, Watashitachiha Ushinai Sugita); 259. "A Dull Sword" (鈍い剣, Nibui ken); 260. "Words I Didn't Intend to Say" (言うつもりなかった言葉, Iu Tsumori nakatta Kotoba); 261. "Darkness Falls" (闇、落つる, Yami, o Tsuru); 262. "At the Ruins of the Palace" (ボロボロの登城, Boroboro no Tojō)
46	June 20, 2025	978-4-592-22535-5	July 7, 2026	978-1-9747-1671-5
263. "A World Without Pain" (痛みのない世界, Itami no nai Sekai); 264. "In the Palm of Their Hands" (手のひらの上で, Tenohira no ue de); 265. "My Heart Ached for the Four Dragons" (四龍を哀れだと思ってた, Shi Ryū o Awareda to Omotteta); 266. "Pursuing a Vision from a Distant Day" (遠い日の景色を追いかけて, Tōi hi no Keshiki o Oikakete); 267. "From the Distant Past to My Future" (はるかな昔から私の未来へ, Harukana Mukashikara Watashi no Mirai e); 268. "The Scales that Weigh on My Heart" (心を縛る秤, Kokoro o Shibaru Hakari)
47	February 20, 2026 (regular edition); February 20, 2026 (limited edition)	978-4-592-22569-0; 978-4-592-10649-4	January 5, 2027	978-1-9747-6978-0
269. Ten o mo Osorenu Mono (天をも恐れぬ者); 270. Ochite Iku (堕ちていく); 271. Hibi Wareta Rakuen (ヒビ割れた楽園); 272. Tōmeina Ikidomari (透明な行き止まり); 273. Tasogare no Umi (黄昏の海); 274. Shōheki no Tate (障壁の盾); 275. Yoake no Shukufuku (夜明けの祝福)
48	October 20, 2026 (regular edition); October 20, 2026 (limited edition)	978-4-592-22579-9; 978-4-592-10650-0	—	—

== Novel ==
No.	Title	Japanese release date	Japanese ISBN
01	Yona of the Dawn: Under the Same Moon; Akatsuki no Yona Onaji Tsuki no Shita de (暁のヨナ 同じ月の下で)	March 20, 2015	978-4-592-19795-9
