= List of Yona of the Dawn episodes =

Yona of the Dawn is an anime series produced by Pierrot and directed by Kazuhiro Yoneda. The series follows Yona, the princess of the Kouka Kingdom, who is chased out of the castle with her bodyguard, Son Hak, after her father is murdered at the hands of Yona's cousin, Soo-Won. Together, the two embark on a journey to find the legendary four dragons, in order to seek their aid in reclaiming the kingdom. It aired between October 7, 2014, and March 24, 2015, on AT-X. Funimation has licensed the anime series for streaming and home video rights in North America. Beginning on March 17, 2015, Funimation streamed their dubbed version of the anime, starting with episode 13. The first opening theme is an instrumental song by Kunihiko Ryo, called Akatsuki no Yona (暁のヨナ; lit. meaning Yona of the Dawn), while the first ending theme is Yoru (夜; lit. meaning Night) by Vistlip. The second opening theme is "Akatsuki no Hana", by Cyntia, and the second ending theme is "Akatsuki", by Akiko Shikata. Three original video animations were bundled with the manga's 19th, 21st and 22nd limited edition volumes, respectively. The first OVA was released on September 18, 2015, the second OVA was released on August 19, 2016, and the third OVA was released on December 20, 2016.

== Episode list ==
No.	Title	Original air date
1	"The Princess Yona"; Transliteration: "Ōjo Yona" (Japanese: 王女ヨナ)	October 7, 2014
Princess Yona is the only daughter of King Il, the pacifistic ruler of the Kouka Kingdom. Yona worries about her red hair moments before the arrival of her older cousin and love interest Soo-Won. A flashback reveals that Soo-Won gave Yona a pear and slept by her side for one night to help her cope with her mother's death. The next day, Yona's childhood friend and bodyguard Son Hak practices mounted archery with Soo-Won, who later shows Yona how to ride a horse. Disapproving of Yona yearning to be with Soo-Won, King Il wants to decide his own successor to the kingdom. She later runs into Soo-Won and confesses to him, but he only sees her as a sister rather than a lover. Five days later, Yona celebrates her sixteenth birthday, and a party is held in the castle. Soo-Won gives Yona a hairpin as a gift, telling her that her crimson hair is like the color of the sky at dawn. At night when it rains, Yona witnesses Soo-Won stabbing King Il in the chest.
2	"Broken Bond"; Transliteration: "Chigireta Kizuna" (Japanese: ちぎれた絆)	October 14, 2014
Soo-Won tells Yona that he was avenging the death of his father Yu-Hon, who was killed by King Il in the past. Soo-Won's adviser Kye-Sook arrives and suggests for the castle guards to kill Yona in order to silence her. However, Hak appears and defends Yona from being attacked by the castle guards. Once Hak learns of King Il's death, he clashes with Soo-Won. Hak manages to injure Soo-Won, but the castle guards capture Yona and surround Hak. Yona's servant Min-Soo fires an arrow as a distraction, allowing Hak to retrieve Yona and evade the castle guards. Min-Soo disguises himself with a kimono and sacrifices his life as a decoy, giving Yona and Hak the chance to escape from Hiryuu Castle into the mountains. In response, Soo-Won sends the castle guards to search for the two.
3	"Faraway Sky"; Transliteration: "Tōi Sora" (Japanese: 遠い空)	October 21, 2014
Three years ago, Hak declined King Il's offer to become Yona's bodyguard. Yona tried to avoid being seen by Lord Kan Tae-Jun of the Fire Clan. Hak later pretended to be Yona's lover in order to stop Tae-Jun from harassing Yona, thereafter vowing to protect her always and forever. A flashback reveals that Yona, Hak and Soo-Won played in the snow as children, but they all ended up feeling sick. After having not seen her father for many days, Yona cried tears of joy when King Il finally brought her some chicken porridge, even those it tasted rancid. In the present, while Yona briefly bathes in a lake, Hak finds her hairpin left on the ground and hides it from her, hoping that she will move on from the past. She later wanders off, upon noticing that her hairpin has gone missing, but finds herself in a snake pit. Hak rescues Yona, despite getting bitten by a snake, and returns the hairpin back to her, realizing that she cannot let go of her residual feelings for Soo-Won.
4	"The Wind Clan"; Transliteration: "Kaze no Buzoku" (Japanese: 風の部族)	October 28, 2014
Hak takes Yona to the Capital of Fuuga, the hometown of the Wind Clan, to allow her to recuperate. Meanwhile at Hiryuu Castle, Soo-Won seeks approval from the five clan generals to appoint him as the new king of the Kouka Kingdom. However, Hak's adoptive grandfather Elder Son Mundok, one of the clan generals, defers from giving his support before taking his leave. Hak's younger adoptive brother Tae-Yeon feeds Yona with a hot meal, which reminds her of her father. When Yona and Hak prepare to do some laundry outside, they later learn that the Fire Clan has dammed up the river upstream, cutting off the water supply for the Wind Clan. Tae-Jun intercepts the merchants selling water, coincidentally the same ones delivering medicine for Tae-Yeon, who is now in dire health. Hak decides to dissociate from the Wind Clan in order to protect his hometown, but he first requests Mundok to accept Soo-Won as the new king of the Kouka Kingdom and to welcome Yona as a villager of the Wind Clan.
5	"Roar"; Transliteration: "Hōkō" (Japanese: 咆哮)	November 4, 2014
After Tae-Yeon receives his medicine, Yona witnesses the injured merchants who are being treated for their wounds, giving her the resolve to prevent the Wind Clan from getting involved in the conflict any further. She humbly thanks Tae-Yeon for his hospitality, and she later convinces Hak to take her with him. Mundok directs them to find an oracle with the power to foresee the future of the Kouka Kingdom. Meanwhile, Tae-Jun's servant Heuk-Chi reports that Yona and Hak are headed toward the northern forest in the mountains. In response, Tae-Jun sends his soldiers after the two. Hak manages to deflect much of the soldiers, but he is eventually shot by a poisoned arrow while trying to protect Yona. Hak leaves Yona at a hidden spot and goes back to face a soldier alone, but Yona runs out and knocks down the soldier before confronting Tae-Jun about his recent actions.
6	"The Crimson Hair"; Transliteration: "Akai Kami" (Japanese: 紅い髪)	November 11, 2014
Due to the poison, Hak becomes too weak to fight off more soldiers. He is driven off the cliff, yet he manages to perilously hang onto the edge with one arm. Tae-Jun grabs Yona by her hair in order to prevent her from moving, but Yona uses Tae-Jun's sword to cut her hair and free herself. Yona attempts to pull Hak up onto the ground, but they instead fall off the cliff into the valley below. At night, Tae-Jun reports to Soo-Won that Yona and Hak are assumed dead, showing Yona's recovered hair as proof. As dawn rises the next day, Soo-Won remembers when Hak promised to serve under him if he were to marry Yona. Soo-Won is finally crowned king during the coronation ceremony with his ambition to restore the kingdom to its former glory. Meanwhile, Yona wakes up in a hut to a caretaker named Yoon, who is currently treating Hak for his wounds as he is currently unconscious. As Yoon's guardian Ik-Soo arrives, it is revealed that Ik-Soo is the oracle.
7	"Fate"; Transliteration: "Tenmei" (Japanese: 天命)	November 18, 2014
Yoon mentions that Yona never once thanked him for treating Hak thus far. After Yona later thanks Yoon, he tells her that the oracles were banished from the kingdom in the past for their higher authority over the kings. At night, a worried Yona finds Hak outside and expresses her concern of feeling abandoned. The next morning, Yona meets up with Ik-Soo near a waterfall, where they discuss about the kingdom's creation myth of the four dragons, the same story that King Il told Yona when she was younger. The four dragons bestowed their power upon four warriors to protect King Hiryuu, who was the human embodiment of the crimson dragon, until the kingdom was rid of evil. The four dragon warriors dispersed after King Hiryuu finally rested in peace. Ik-Soo instructs Yona to find the descendants of the four dragon warriors, lest Hak would be on the path to death. Wanting to become stronger, Yona asks Hak to teach her how to fight.
8	"The Chosen Door"; Transliteration: "Eranda Tobira" (Japanese: 選んだ扉)	November 25, 2014
Yoon gives Yona a homemade dress and a haircut. When Yona later speaks with Ik-Soo, Yoon is surprised to overhear that he would accompany Yona and Hak on their journey. Seven years ago, Yoon lived alone on the verge of starvation in the Touka Village of the Fire Clan. Yoon attacked Ik-Soo, who was rumored to be a wanderer carrying gold nuggets, which led a guilty Yoon to bring Ik-Soo back to his house. After Yoon treated Ik-Soo with medicine at night, Ik-Soo traded his shoes for a potato to give to Yoon the next morning. Ik-Soo told Yoon about his job as an oracle, and also taught Yoon how to make sandals out of straw. Realizing that Ik-Soo has struggled throughout his travels, a worried Yoon pleaded to join him. In the present, Yoon makes new straw sandals for Ik-Soo, and the two tearfully bid each other farewell near the waterfall. The next day, Yoon sets off on a journey with Yona and Hak.
9	"Wavering Determination"; Transliteration: "Furueru Kakugo" (Japanese: ふるえる覚悟)	December 2, 2014
Yona, Hak and Yoon cross the territory of the Fire Clan to reach the Khai Empire in the mountains. On the way, they stop by a village to stock up on supplies. Also, they hear word that Soo-Won has been crowned king of the Kouka Kingdom. While continuing their travel, Hak agrees to teach Yona archery so can she learn how to fight in battle. Yona diligently practices day and night to improve her aim using a bow and arrow, though she struggles since King Il opposed the use of weaponry. Hak tells Yona to aim at him to motivate her to kill a human, but after he proves to be too swift, she grazes his face when he tells her to imagine him as Soo-Won. Although Yona wants to protect Hak, he considers himself as a tool, since it is his job to protect her. After Yoon has gone missing, Yona and Hak are ambushed by a group of archers, who soon realize that the two were sent by Ik-Soo. The group of archers are revealed to be the guardians of the descendant of the white dragon warrior.
10	"Yearn"; Transliteration: "Taibō" (Japanese: 待望)	December 9, 2014
Yona and Hak are taken to the Village of Hakuryuu, where Yoon is released from captivity due to be associated with them. Yona is told that she may the descendant of King Hiryuu, the crimson dragon king. Kija is shown as the descendant of the white dragon warrior, with the power of the white dragon sealed in his right hand. As Kija approaches Yona, he recognizes her as the crimson dragon princess, the one that he was destined to protect. Although he agrees to leave the village to travel with her, this creates a conflict between Hak and Kija over who should protect Yona. At night, a banquet is held in honor of Kija. The next morning, Kija's grandmother tearfully says goodbye to Kija before he leaves with Yona, Hak and Yoon. It is revealed that Kija has the ability to sense the other dragon warriors when they are nearby.
11	"The Dragon's Claws"; Transliteration: "Ryū no Tsume" (Japanese: 龍の爪)	December 16, 2014
Kija senses that the blue dragon warrior is the closest distance away. A group of bandits try the rob Yona, Hak, Yoon and Kija, but Hak and Kija gain some mutual respect and manage to defeat the bandits, despite their squabble about who is better in combat. After the four have dinner, Yoon deduces that there are six possible areas north-northeast from their location where the blue dragon warrior might be. The next day, the four go to all of those areas, but there is no sign of blue dragon warrior. After a whole day has gone by, Kija becomes frustrated because he cannot accurately sense the blue dragon warrior. While Yona strenuously practices archery at night, Hak tells Kija about how Yona wants to be strong enough to fight even though she is a princess. The following day, Yoon finally realizes where the blue dragon warrior is most likely located.
12	"The Blindfolded Dragon"; Transliteration: "Mekakushi no Ryū" (Japanese: 目隠しの龍)	December 23, 2014
Yona, Hak, Yoon and Kija arrive at the Village of Seiryuu, shown as a network of caves, where many villagers are seen wearing masks. Although the villagers deny about the blue dragon warrior being around, the four are granted to stay at the village overnight. While exploring the caves, Yona gets separated from the group, and she encounters a male villager, who takes her deeper into the caves. After the villager tries to harm Yona, she is rescued by the blue dragon warrior, who scares off the villager. When Yona catches up to her friends, the blue dragon warrior runs away. Eighteen years ago, the blue dragon warrior was born with the power of the blue dragon sealed in his eyes. Four years ago, he was feared by the other villagers, due to his power to paralyze those who look in his eyes. He was taught how to fight with a sword and how to control his power by his guardian Ao, who slowly became blind over time before dying.
13	"The Rippling Fear"; Transliteration: "Hankyō Suru Kyōfu" (Japanese: 反響する恐怖)	January 6, 2015
The blue dragon warrior dazedly escapes deep in the caves after feeling a strange aura when he touched Yona. In an effort to find the blue dragon warrior, Yona and Yoon eventually unveil a secret passageway, while Hak and Kija stay behind. When Yona and Yoon find the blue dragon warrior behaving agitated, Yona calmly asks him to be her ally. However, the blue dragon warrior tells the two to leave. Kija is surrounded by a group of hostile villagers, who intend to kill Yona and Yoon for knowing the identity of the blue dragon warrior. An earthquake separates Hak from the other three, who are trapped with the panicking villagers. When a male villager explains the curse of the village, the blue dragon warrior enters. The villager strikes the blue dragon warrior out of fear, knocking off his mask and exposing his eyes.
14	"Light"; Transliteration: "Hikari" (Japanese: 光)	January 13, 2015
The blue dragon warrior retrieves his mask and begins digging a path out of the rubble. Yona, Yoon and Kija join the blue dragon warrior, while Hak starts digging from the outside, where the rest of the villagers are waiting. Despite being weakened by the thin air, Yona continues to dig, showing the blue dragon warrior that she does not give up. Hak finally breaks through the rubble and reunites with Yona. The blue dragon warrior agrees to travel with Yona, Hak, Yoon and Kija. Soon after, Kija collapses from exhaustion, so they set up camp and eat a meal. The blue dragon warrior surprisingly calls Yona by name, despite his lack of communication skills. Yona allows Yoon to call her by name as well, yet only permits Hak to address her as his princess. Yona decides to name the blue dragon warrior Shin-Ah, meaning "moonlight". The next morning, Kija tells Yona that the green dragon warrior is nearby.
15	"To a New Land"; Transliteration: "Aratana Chi e" (Japanese: 新たな地へ)	January 20, 2015
As Yona, Hak, Yoon, Kija and Shin-Ah search for the green dragon warrior, they enter a dilapidated village. They encounter a sickly man, who criticizes the late King Il, believed to have been a weak ruler. However, Yona later overhears Hak expressing to Yoon, Kija and Shin-Ah that King Il was neither a fool nor a coward during his reign. Meanwhile, Soo-Won visits Chishin, the capital of the Earth Clan, and meets with Lord Lee Geun-Tae of the Earth Clan. Unimpressed with Soo-Won due to his young age and easygoing personality, Geun-Tae questions him if he would restore the kingdom to its former glory. Geun-Tae's advisor Chul-Rang later shares with Soo-Won about how Geun-Tae is idolized by the clan. With that in mind, Soo-Won declares that a mock battle festival should be held in a stadium at Chishin in a week, much to Geun-Tae's disagreement.
16	"Pretend-War"; Transliteration: "Ikusa Gokko" (Japanese: 戦ごっこ)	January 27, 2015
Soo-Won and Geun-Tae lead and divide the participants in teams of white and red, respectively. The objective is for one team to score the most points by breaking the cup plates strapped on top of the heads of the opposing team. During the mock battle festival, Geun-Tae observes how Soo-Won appears to be cowardice, but instead leads his team to take out the opposing team. Geun-Tae is impressed after realizing that Soo-Won executed hidden techniques, such as using the gust of wind to his advantage. Even though the white team eventually defeat the red team, Geun-Tae beats Soo-Won in a duel, thereby winning the mock battle festival. Soo-Won later leaves Chishin, having stimulated demand for tea brewed by Geun-Tae's wife Yun-Ho to sell in the Khai Empire, reinvigorated production in the mines of the Earth Clan and inspired anew the Earth Clan of the strength of their leader.
17	"Pirate of Awa"; Transliteration: "Awa no Kaizoku" (Japanese: 阿波の海賊)	February 3, 2015
Yona, Hak, Yoon, Kija and Shin-Ah reach Port Awa. When Hak enters the city alone, he sees two male officers harassing a girl. Hak defeats them with the help of the green dragon warrior, but without realizing his identity before he suddenly disappears. The next day, Hak encounters the green dragon warrior again and hangs out with him at a brothel. Yona and Yoon finds Hak just when the green dragon warrior suddenly disappears again. The girl from before explains to the others that the officers have always been corrupt in the streets. It is shown that the green dragon warrior, later recognized as Jae-Ha, has the power of the green dragon sealed in his right leg. Thirteen years ago, Jae-Ha joined a band of good pirates led by an old woman named Gi-Gan. He assists in sinking a boat carrying drugs which belonged to Yang Kum-Ji, the feudal lord of Port Awa. Gi-Gan suggests for Jae-Ha to recruit Hak as part of the crew.
18	"Ties"; Transliteration: "Enishi" (Japanese: 縁)	February 10, 2015
With Shin-Ah staying behind, Yona, Hak, Yoon and Kija hide from corrupt officers while walking in the streets. Hak and Jae-Ha secretly meet, and they burn wanted posters of themselves. However, Jae-Ha flees again after failing to convince Hak to join him. Yona, Hak and Yoon are shocked when the son of a married couple was attacked by the corrupt officers earlier. Meanwhile, Kija finally finds Jae-Ha, but Jae-Ha rejects his destiny to protect the crimson dragon alongside the other dragon warriors. While talking to Hak again, Jae-Ha discovers that Yona is the master of the dragon warriors. Although Jae-Ha turns down the invitation to accompany Yona, she agrees to meet with Gi-Gan the next day. At the pirate ship, Gi-Gan recruits Yona, Hak, Yoon, Kija and Shin-Ah, eventually seeing all of them as potential assets.
19	"Trial of the Cheonsu Plant"; Transliteration: "Senjusō no Tameshi" (Japanese: 千樹草の試し)	February 17, 2015
In order to prove herself with the will to fight, Yona is tasked to retrieve a cheonsu plant, a valuable medicinal herb only found inside the cave of a sea cliff called the Mist-Shrouded Cape. Yona manages to reach inside the cave and retrieve the cheonsu plant. She is then swept away by a large wave and is left hanging from a thorny tree branch, but Jae-Ha rescues her from falling. Yona and Jae-Ha return to Gi-Gan with the cheonsu plant. Even though she had help from Jae-Ha, Yona is proven worthy enough to join the pirates. Later, Hak is torn with mixed emotions for Yona when he pours honey on her hands in order to heal them. Since Gi-Gan is planning on disbanding the crew, she allows Yona to take Jae-Ha with her after this one last mission together. Shin-Ah spots seven ships with armed men across the horizon. Gi-Gan explains that Kum-Ji is planning a large-scale transaction with the Khai Empire with a deal in human trafficking.
20	"Chain of Courage"; Transliteration: "Yuki no Rensa" (Japanese: 勇気の連鎖)	February 24, 2015
The plan is for the pirates to attack the mercenaries in the open waters between Port Awa and the Khai Empire in order to stop the transaction. However, it is unknown as to which of the seven ships is carrying the women. Yona is invited by Jae-Ha to scout the city streets with him. The two meet a woman disguised as a man, whose female friend was kidnapped in a rundown store, which actually belonged to Kum-Ji. Jae-Ha reports to Gi-Gan that the transaction will take place in two days at noon. Yona volunteers to infiltrate the store in order to signal with a firework which ship is harboring the hostages. Gi-Gan agrees with the condition that Yoon goes as well. After thanking Gi-Gan for this opportunity, Yona later tells Hak to let her go and allow her to make up for the people who have suffered thus far. One day later, Yona and Yoon go to the store dressed as women. A man sends Yona and Yoon in a dark room, where a trap door opens, sending the two underground.
21	"Spark"; Transliteration: "Hibana" (Japanese: 火花)	March 3, 2015
Yona and Yoon are taken into a cellar with the other captured women, and Yona sprains her ankle in the process. When Kum-Ji arrives and abuses the two, he suspects that Yona is a princess. However, she manages to allay his fears and causes him to leave. A woman named Yu-Ri expresses herself as livestock, but Yona tells her that the women must have faith and fight for their lives in order to free themselves from the corruption. As the women are being transported into the open waters, the pirates raid Kum-Ji's main ship. Yona, Yoon and Yu-Ri try to escape to the deck of their ship, but they are apprehended by two men. Yoon is taken to the deck by more men after saying that a bomb is placed on the bow of the ship. Yona manages to escape to the deck and frightens the men with a bow and arrow. She then takes Yoon's firework and launches it by using a lantern, giving the signal for Shin-ah to see from a distance.
22	"History Is Made at Night"; Transliteration: "Rekishi wa Yoru Tsukurareru" (Japanese: 歴史は夜作られる)	March 10, 2015
Yona and Yoon are rescued by Jae-Ha as well as Shin-Ah, while Hak, Kija and Gi-Gan continue to fight off the mercenaries. As the pirates nearly defeat all of the mercenaries, Kum-Ji attempts to flee on a rowboat. Shin-Ah directs Jae-Ha towards the rowboat, but before Jae-Ha can make it there, Kum-Ji shoots him in the shoulder with his bow and arrow. Kum-Ji is stricken with fear when Yona aims her bow and arrow at him from the transport ship. Kum-Ji is shot in the chest and falls into the sea. As dawn breaks, the pirates and women return to Port Awa to celebrate their success by drinking liquor gathered from all over town. As Yona wanders alone in the streets, she unexpectedly bumps into Soo-Won.
23	"Morning of Pledges"; Transliteration: "Chikai no Asa" (Japanese: 誓いの朝)	March 17, 2015
Soo-Won tells Yona that he traveled to Port Awa to investigate the human trafficking incident. When Soo-Won's general Han Joo-Doh finds Soo-Won, the latter conceals Yona underneath his cloak while discussing with the former about what happened the night before. After Joo-Doh leaves, Soo-Won admits about being aware of Yona's desire of killing him, shown when she tried to draw his sword within his cloak, but he states that he cannot die yet. He leaves a speechless Yona in order to return to Hiryuu Castle, and Hak later finds her fallen on her knees while crying. Back at the pirate ship, Hak worries as Yona pretends to be positive around the other pirates. Yona tells Hak, Yoon, Kija and Shin-Ah that she will be leaving Port Awa soon. At night, Jae-Ha reminisces about his time spent with the pirates and says his farewell to Gi-Gan. The next day, Gi-Gan gives Yona cheonsu plant as a parting gift. As Yona, Hak, Yoon, Kija and Shin-Ah continue their journey, Jae-Ha decides to tag along with them.
24	"From Here On"; Transliteration: "Korekara" (Japanese: これから)	March 24, 2015
Yona, Hak, Yoon, Kija, Shin-Ah and Jae-Ha set up camp, and the subject of the yellow dragon warrior is brought up. As a fawn is being prepared to be cooked, the yellow dragon warrior is drawn to the aroma. However, it is a surprise that the yellow dragon warrior, who casually introduces himself as Zeno, did not sense an awakening when he met Yona, was not hesitant to join the group and does not appear to have any special ability. The next day, the seven of them go to Yoon's hut, where Yoon scolds a careless Ik-Soo. As Yoon wonders what the "sword and shield to protect the sovereign" from the legend is referring to, Ik-Soo reassures that they will know when it will happen. Yona later admits to Ik-Soo that now she has mixed feelings for Soo-Won, recalling the encounter in Port Awa. At night when it rain, Hak finds Yona practicing with a sword, and they take shelter in a cave. Hak tells Yona that he wants her to be seen by everyone, due to how much she has changed as a person. The next day, Yona's group prepare for their journey back to the Kouka Kingdom.
OVA–1	"On That Back"; Transliteration: "Sono Se ni wa" (Japanese: その背には)	September 18, 2015
Yona and the gang head to a hot springs hotel, where they are greeting by the owner, an old women who always dozes off. Later on, Jae-Ha wonders why Kija has not entered the men's bath, discovering that Kija has a scar on his back shaped like claw marks and coming to the conclusion that the previous white dragon warrior scarred Kija's back. Jae-Ha does all he can to distract Hak while Kija washes up at a well. However, Kija exposes his back in front of his friends because a spider crawled down his back, and Jae-Ha painfully disposes of the spider. It is revealed that when Kija was born, he was attacked by his father, who was the predecessor. Kija was only allowed to see his father under supervision. When his father fell ill, Kija visited him alone, noticing that his father's dragon's claw turned into a human hand, and Kija embraced his father before he died. The next day, Yona and the gang leave the hot springs hotel and continue their travels.
OVA–2	"The Yellow Dragon Zeno's Past, Part 1: The Starting Dragon"; Transliteration: "Kō Ryū Zeno Kako-hen Zenpen 'Hajimari no Ryū'" (Japanese: 黄龍ゼノ過去編 前編 「はじまりの龍」)	August 19, 2016
The gang has a drinking competition around the campfire, in which Jae-Ha eventually wins by default. During that night Yona almost tell Hak that she likes him. A flashback reveals when Zeno first became the yellow dragon warrior, but he feels useless on the battlefield with King Hiryuu, who is the crimson king, and the other original dragon warriors. Gu-En is the first white dragon warrior, Abi the first blue dragon warrior and Shu-Ten the first green dragon warrior. Although Zeno possesses no combat skills, he has the power to heal very quickly. When Zeno demonstrates his power, King Hiryuu is shocked by this and gives him the crest bestowed by the dragon gods themselves. King Hiryuu and the dragon warriors are feared and targeted by more humans, who either perished or retreated due to the powers of the dragons. After King Hiryuu rests in peace, Gu-En, Abi and Shu-Ten give a heartfelt farewell to Zeno, who stays to look after the castle. As Gu-En, Abi and Shu-Ten disperse their separate ways for twenty years, Zeno realizes that the other three have died due to aging. Zeno takes out an entire army by himself as he mourns the death of his friends.
OVA–3	"The Yellow Dragon Zeno's Past, Part 2: A Red Star Rises"	December 19, 2016
Zeno leaves the castle to track down the descendants of the dragon warriors. He is shot with a bow and arrow by some archers, and he wakes up in a hut to a girl named Kaya. She reveals that she has a contagious disease, hence why she lives in a secluded area. Since Zeno cannot get ill, he spends time with her and takes care of her. He eventually asks for her hand in marriage, and she cries in response. Overnight, Zeno holds Kaya's hand as she dies and rots. After many years, Zeno sets out to find the descendants of the dragon warriors for the sake of King Hiryuu. Zeno visits the villages of the dragon warriors, meeting a four-year-old Kija after he bathes, meeting a two-year-old Shin-Ah while playing with a ball and meeting a nine-year-old Jae-Ha sleeping while shackled at his wrists and ankles. In the present, Zeno wakes up in his tent to his friends and gives them a group hug, making them uncomfortable. Since Yoon opted out of the drinking competition due to doing various chores, Jae-Ha forfeits his win to Yoon, with no objections from the others. A post-credits short story features a flashback of Yona and Hak's time at the castle. Yona requests that Hak sleep with her for the night, claiming to be seeing ghosts. However, she later admits to having nightmares of Hak's death, prompting him to comfort her.
