= Kusanagi (disambiguation) =

The Kusanagi no Tsurugi (草薙剣) is a legendary Japanese sword and one of three Imperial Regalia of Japan.

Kusanagi, which means "grass cutter", may also refer to:

== People ==
Kusanagi is a Japanese surname. Notable people with this surname include:

- Kōjirō Kusanagi (草薙 幸二郎, 1929–2007), Japanese actor
- Mizuho Kusanagi (草凪 みずほ, born 1979), Japanese manga artist
- Shinpei Kusanagi (草彅 心平, born 1973), Japanese painter
- Tsuyoshi Kusanagi (草彅 剛, born 1974), Japanese entertainer, former member of boy band SMAP

== In fiction ==
- Motoko Kusanagi, fictional Japanese character in the Ghost in the Shell anime and manga series
- Suito Kusanagi, a fictional character in the Sky Crawlers book series
- Kyo Kusanagi, one of the main characters in SNK Corporation's The King of Fighters video game series
- Kei Kusanagi and Mizuho Kusanagi, characters in the anime series Please Teacher!
- Godou Kusanagi, one of the characters in the Campione! light novel and anime series
- Kusanagi, a fictional weapon in the Naruto franchise
- Kusanagi Shiyū, a member of the Dragons of Earth in the X anime and manga series
- Blade of Kusanagi, a weapon in the video game Ōkami developed by Clover Studio
- Kimiko Kusanagi and Kaito Kusanagi, characters in the webcomic Dresden Codak
- Nene Kusanagi, a character in the video game Hatsune Miku: Colorful Stage!
- Naoya Kusanagi, a character in the visual novels Sakura no Uta and Sakura no Toki

== Other uses ==
- Kusanagi, a technique in Danzan-ryū jujutsu
