= Aion 2 =

2025 massively multiplayer online role-playing game

- Developer: NC
- Publisher: NC
- Producer: Namjoon Kim
- Composers: Simon Franglen; Ryo Kunihiko
- Engine: Unreal Engine 5
- Platforms: Microsoft Windows, Android, iOS
- Release: KR: November 19, 2025; TW: November 19, 2025; WW: October 5, 2026
- Genre: MMORPG
- Mode: Multiplayer

Aion 2 is a massively multiplayer online role-playing game developed and published by NC. It is a sequel to Aion, taking place 200 years after the events of the first game. The same conflict between the Elyos and Asmodians is featured in this game.

The game was released in South Korea and Taiwan on 19 November 2025 for PC and mobile devices. The global PC version of the game entered early access on 30 September 2026 and released on 5 October 2026.

== Gameplay ==
Aion 2 has open-world exploration, character progression, PvE and PvP combat. The game copies several mechanics and concepts from the original Aion.

Aion 2 features combat with an emphasis on timing, positioning and skill combinations. The game includes both traditional target-based combat and an action-oriented control option in the global version. The player can chain a skill into another, with some abilities becoming available after particular attacks or conditions.

Aion 2 featured eight playable classes at launch: Gladiator, Templar, Assassin, Ranger, Sorcerer, Spiritmaster, Cleric, and Chanter. A ninth class, the Brawler, was added to the Korean and Taiwanese versions in July 2026. The Brawler uses gauntlets and builds a Rage gauge through attacks, with a full gauge activating a Rampage state. The Brawler was not included in the initial global PC release.

Aion 2 features extensive character customization. Players can alter characteristics including facial features, hair, body type and other cosmetic details.

Flight is a major component of Aion 2. The game also includes underwater exploration. The world of Aion 2 was described by NC as being approximately 36 times larger than that of the original game. The game's design focuses on vertical exploration, allowing players to fly to areas visible from the surrounding environment. Early coverage of the global version similarly identified flight and open-world exploration as the game's features.

Aion 2 contains a variety of PvE activities, including solo, party dungeons, raids, field encounters and other co-op content. NC announced more than 200 dungeons covering several different formats, including solo challenges and group content. PvE activities include Expedition, Transcendence, Eradication, Sanctuary, Nightmare Dungeon, Seal Dungeon, Garrison and Awakening Battle content.

The game's pre-release demonstrations included the Urugugu Canyon dungeon and a reworked version of Fire Temple, a location from the original Aion. The Fire Temple encounter includes Kromede, a character associated with the original dungeon.

PvP in Aion 2 is based on conflict between the Elyos and Asmodians. The game includes the Abyss, Arena, Battlefield and Rift systems, with the Abyss providing a major setting for faction-based combat. A March 2026 update introduced Chaotic Abyss, a variant of faction warfare that divided players into Western and Eastern forces and included separate PvP and PvE damage coefficients.

Aion 2 includes gathering, crafting and an in-game trading system. The Trade system allows players to exchange items using in-game currency.

The game features pets and mounts as part of its exploration and character systems. Pets and cosmetic items were among the features demonstrated during the game's 2026 Gamescom presentation.

== Setting ==
=== World ===
Aion 2 is set 200 years after Aion: The Tower of Eternity. The world has been expanded compared to the original game by designing the game around aerial and underwater exploration, allowing players to explore the world in three dimensions. The game's story begins with the Elyos and Asmodians in separate regions. As the story progresses, the two factions become involved in large-scale Realm versus Realm warfare.

=== Factions ===
Players choose between the Elyos and Asmodians, the two principal factions inherited from the original Aion. The Elyos and Asmodians begin their journeys in different regions and eventually participate in large-scale conflicts. The faction system forms the basis for the game's RvR content.

== Plot ==
Aion 2 is set in the fictional world of Atreia about 200 years after the game "Aion: The Tower of Eternity." This game continues the rivalry between Elyos and Asmodians factions, as players can select one of these factions and start playing from a different region. The storyline continues to develop based on the previous events and leads to the confrontation between the two factions.

There are distinct campaigns for the two factions in the game. In its review, COGconnected noted that the campaign is playable mostly alone but criticized the storyline, missions and characters as being shallow.

== Development ==
Aion 2 was developed as a sequel to Aion: The Tower of Eternity. Aion 2 was developed using Unreal Engine 5. The engine was used to create the game's environments, character models, animations and expanded world.

The game was presented in more details during the AION2NIGHT livestream held in May 2025. NC revealed the game's setting, world scale, classes, dungeons and combat systems during the presentation. It was demonstrated at G-STAR in October 2025.

NC conducted a focus group test for Aion 2 in June 2025. The test allowed participants to experience character customization, combat and PvE content and provide feedback to the development team.

NC prepared a separate global version of Aion 2 for release outside South Korea and Taiwan. The global version was developed as a PC-only release and was distributed through Steam and NC's PURPLE platform. Before the global release, NC conducted outreach to Western players and collected feedback concerning the global version.

== Release ==
Aion 2 released in South Korea and Taiwan on November 19, 2025. The initial release supported both PC and mobile devices. The producers announced that the global version of Aion 2 would launch in the second half of 2026. The global release was planned for North America, South America, Europe and Japan.

The global PC version entered Early Access on September 30, 2026 for Founder's Packs. During Early Access, the game reached first place on Steam's global Top Sellers chart and ranked first in several national markets.

The global version was officially released on October 5, 2026, through Steam and PURPLE. It operates servers in Asia, North America, South America, Europe and Japan and supports eight languages.

On the first day of the global launch, NC reported that Aion 2 exceeded 400,000 peak concurrent users. The game also remained at the top of Steam's global charts for new releases and free games.

== Updates ==
=== Season 2 ===
Producers announced Season 2 in January 2026. It expanded both PvE and PvP content.

The update added new Expedition, Raid, Ascension Trial and Nightmare content and introduced changes to the Abyss and character progression systems.

=== Class overhaul and Chaotic Abyss ===
In March 2026, game introduced a class balance update and added new Stigma skills. The update also introduced Chaotic Abyss, a new faction-based PvP mode.

=== Chapter 1: Lands of Sand and Snow ===
The first major content chapter, Lands of Sand and Snow, was released for the Korean and Taiwanese versions on July 1, 2026.

The update introduced the Brawler class, which uses gauntlets and a Rage-based combat system. It also increased the level cap from 45 to 50 and introduced the Eltnen and Morheim regions for the Elyos and Asmodians respectively.

Additional content included new dungeons, Sealed Dungeons, Strongholds, Monoliths and expanded party systems. The update also introduced new support systems intended to assist new and returning players.

The global PC release did not initially contain the Brawler class, instead launching with the earlier eight-class lineup.

== Music ==
The original soundtrack for Aion 2, titled The Echoes of Eternity, was released on November 19, 2025, alongside the game's South Korean and Taiwanese launch.

The soundtrack contains 70 tracks divided into three chapters. The title track was co-composed by Simon Franglen and Ryo Kunihiko. Ryo previously composed music for the original Aion.

The title track, "The Tower of Eternity: Into the New World", was performed with the Chamber Orchestra of London and recorded at AIR Studios in London.

== Sales ==
Aion 2 achieved significant commercial results following its South Korean and Taiwanese launch. NC reported that the game surpassed 100 billion Korean won in cumulative revenue within 46 days of release and that more than one million characters had purchased memberships during the same period.

According to NC's first-quarter 2026 financial results, Aion 2 generated 136.8 billion Korean won in revenue during the quarter. The game's contribution helped drive NC's PC game revenue to a quarterly record.

Contemporary financial reporting also attributed an increase in NC's PC-game revenue during the fourth quarter of 2025 to the November release of Aion 2.

The game accumulated more than 1.3 million Steam wishlists, according to NC. During Early Access, it reached first place on Steam's global Top Sellers chart and ranked first in multiple national markets.

On October 5, 2026, Aion 2 launched globally. NC reported that the game exceeded 400,000 peak concurrent users on the first day of official service.

== Reception ==
Previews of Aion 2 highlighted its visual presentation, character customization, open-world design and flight system, while expressing reservations about its combat design and monetization model. MMORPG.com's coverage of the game's focus group test described its combat and PvE systems positively while expressing concerns about the potential effects of convenience-oriented monetization and the staggered regional release.

Following the Korean and Taiwanese launch, Aion 2 faced criticism concerning its monetization model. PC Gamer reported that players objected to the relationship between paid memberships, in-game currency and gameplay-related benefits, prompting an emergency response from NC shortly after launch.

Massively Overpowered's September 2026 stress-test coverage praised the game's world design, flight system, character customization and soundtrack, while criticizing the early combat difficulty, class differentiation and user interface.

According to NC, the game exceeded 100 billion Korean won in cumulative revenue 46 days after launch, while more than one million characters had purchased memberships during the same period.

Game rating is 67 out of 100 by Mark Steighner at COGconnected who appreciated graphics, customization of characters, combat and single-player aspect. Mark disapproves quest and NPCs which were boring in his opinion, while monetization system and subscription model are hindrances to the game endgame progression.
