= NG Life =

Manga by Mizuho Kusanagi

- First English volume release of NG Life, published by Tokyopop on March 17, 2009

NG ライフ (NG Raifu)
- Genre: Romantic comedy, Supernatural
- Manga
- Written by: Mizuho Kusanagi
- Published by: Hakusensha
- English publisher: NA: Tokyopop (2008–2011)
- Magazine: Hana to Yume
- Original run: December 26, 2005 – March 5, 2009
- Volumes: 9

NG Life (Japanese: NGライフ, Hepburn: NG Raifu) is a Japanese manga written and illustrated by Mizuho Kusanagi. It was serialized in Hakusensha's Hana to Yume from December 2005 to March 2009. The individual chapters were then encapsulated and released in nine tankōbon volumes. The series was licensed for an English-language release in North America by Tokyopop between 2008 up to 2011 when Tokyopop's North American publishing company was closed down.

The story follows Keidai Saeki, a teenager who retains memories of his past life as a gladiator in Pompeii. In the present, Keidai is reunited with his past life's wife who has reincarnated as a male; meanwhile his male best friend is reincarnated as a female with feelings for Keidai. Reviews have been mixed about the series with reviewers praising or panning the art style and characters. In Japan, the sixth volume of NG Life was ranked 25th on the Tohan charts.

== Plot ==
Keidai Saeki is a high school student with memories of his past life as Sirix Lucretius Fronto, a gladiator in Pompeii who lost his wife Serena in the eruption of Mount Vesuvius in 79 AD. In the present, he is reunited with Loleus, Sirix's male best friend who reincarnated as a girl named Mii Serizawa, and with Serena, who has reincarnated as a male middle school student named Yuuma Ujoh. Keidai has to deal with the feelings he has for Mii and his past love for Serena. As the series progresses, Keidai meets other people who retain memories of Pompeii and discovers that Sirix's guilt in failing to save his friends is the reason why he retains his memories. When Keidai falls into a coma, he is able to relive the last moments of Pompeii where his actions put Sirix's suffering to rest, allowing him to move on with his life and confess his love to Mii.

=== Characters ===
Keidai Saeki (冴木 敬大, Saeki Keidai)

Keidai is a high school student with memories of his past life as Sirix Lucretius Fronto (シリクス ルクレティウス フロント, Shirikusu Rukuretiusu Furonto), a Pompeiian gladiator. His life is thrown into turmoil after he meets Yuuma Ujoh, the reincarnation of Sirix's wife. Keidai is also linked to his family's incarnations; his mother, Renka Saeki (冴木 蓮香, Saeki Renka), was Sirix's younger sister, Aria (アリア), while his father, Shuugo Saeki (冴木 秀吾, Saeki Shuugo), was Sirix's rival Raoul Lucius Verus (ラウル・ルスティウス・ウェルス, Rauru Rusutiusu Werusu). He is friends with Mii Serizawa, the reincarnation of Sirix's close friend. He is unaware of Mii's feelings toward him and his own feelings for her. As the series progresses, Keidai's feelings for Mii grow as he starts to distance himself from Sirix's memories.

Yuuma Ujoh (佑城 裕真, Ujoh Yūma)

Yuuma is the reincarnation of Sirix's wife Serena (セレナ), a maiden who captured the hearts of men with her beauty and kindness. Yuuma retains Serena's feminine face and is often mistaken for a female. As a result, he aims to become more masculine to stop the confusion. Yuuma develops a secret crush on Mii early in the series, but his feelings are not reciprocated. He decides to give up on those feelings believing Keidai and Mii belong together and tries to push them together in order to help Keidai move on from Serena. It is revealed that Serena was reborn as a boy because in her final moments, she felt that had she been a man, she could have been at Sirix's side in the final days of Pompeii, rather than be left behind waiting for him.

Mii Serizawa (芹沢 美依, Serizawa Mii)

Mii is the reincarnation of Sirix's best friend Loleus (ロレイウス, Roreiusu). Serizawa met Keidai in seventh grade when they helped a trapped bird and was the first to learn about his past life. She has a crush on Keidai but remains silent about it, fearing it would ruin their friendship. Serizawa is very popular with boys, though they do not make advances, believing she and Keidai are a couple. In her past life, Loleus helped Sirix meet Serena. Kusanagi reveals Mii's name comes from Serizawa Kamo.

Shinogu Kagami (加賀巳 凌, Kagami Shinogu)

Shinogu is Yuuma's older male cousin and the reincarnation of Serena's overprotective older sister Smyrna (スミルナ, Sumiruna). Like Keidai, he retains memories of his past life, and hates Keidai for abandoning Serena during the volcanic eruption. He has an aversion to hot weather because of his strong memories of that day. He began working as a student teacher at Keidai's high school after Yuuma's family moved to town. Shinogu despises males except for Yuuma, and is a womanizer. Shinogu holds a grudge against Souichi Mikage because in his past life as Delos, he betrayed Aglaia.

Shuna Sakakibara (榊原 朱奈, Sakakibara Shuna)

The reincarnation of a noblewoman named Aglaia Felix (アグライヤ フェリクス, Aguraiya Ferikusu), Shuna was reborn into a wealthy family and retains memories of Pompeii. She loses them at seventeen when she wishes to move on from her past. Shuna is a kind-hearted young woman willing to help anyone in need. When she was two years old, she called her newborn sister Serena due to their physical resemblance; her parents, misheard and named the child Reina. At the age of 10, Shuna meets Souichi Mikage, who also retains his memories of Pompeii, where he served as her bodyguard henceforth. Shuna initially hates Souichi due to his past betrayal, but her feelings for him grow over time and she falls in love with him.

Reina Sakakibara (榊原 麗奈, Sakakibara Reina)

Reina is Shuna's younger sister who closely resembles Serena and dresses in gothic Lolita-style clothing. She grew up hearing stories of Pompeii and developed a crush on Souichi. After Reina has her confession rejected by Souichi, she runs away and happens upon Keidai and the others. She discovers that he also has memories of Pompeii and brings them to Shuna hoping it would bring back her memories. She is in the same class as Yuuma where their similarities make them seem like twins. Reina and Yuuma grow close as friends and begin to speak to each other about their problems. They connect over their predicament of having romantic feelings for those who only see them as a younger sibling. Reina is later revealed to be the reincarnation of a girl named Tina (ティナ), a friend of Serena. Her appearance resembling Serena is explained as Tina's wish to experience the same love Serena has with Sirix.

Souichi Mikage (深影 蒼一, Mikage Souichi)

Souichi is the reincarnation of a mercenary named Delos (ディロス, Dirosu), who served as a bodyguard to Lady Aglaia in Pompeii but later betrayed her. He retains all of his memories of his life in Pompeii and encounters Reina and Shuna when he is fifteen. After discovering that Shuna still has her memories of being Lady Aglaia, he begins working to regain her trust. Souichi blames himself for her memory's disappearance, claiming that her hatred towards him is the cause. Later in the series, it is revealed that Delos fell in love with Lady Aglaia even though he was mercenary hired by the House of Britius to betray her. After framing Aglaia for murder, Delos sought revenge against the House of Britius and murdered every member of the family.

== Publication and conception ==
NG Life, written and illustrated by Mizuho Kusanagi, had its first chapter published in The Hana to Yume on December 26, 2005. It was then serialized in Hana to Yume beginning with the second chapter on March 20, 2006, and ended its run on March 5, 2009. The first tankōbon volume was released by Hakusensha on November 19, 2006, and the ninth on June 19, 2009. Tokyopop licensed the series in 2008 and released the English adapted tankōbon between March 17, 2009, and April 12, 2011. After Tokyopop was shut down, the license was returned to Hakusensha.

During the planning of NG Life, Mizuho Kusanagi discussed with her editor about having a female lead protagonist allowing the readers to relate more to the protagonist. However, a male lead was settled for and the story was written in a romantic-panic comedy style. Kusanagi planned to end the series in its fourth volume, but wanted to add more to the story as it progressed resulting in more volumes. She also commented that even though she struggled with the plot, she enjoyed drawing the characters in the end. In the final chapter, the author revealed she had planned to pair Keidai with Mii since the beginning.

=== Volume list ===
No.	Original release date	Original ISBN	North America release date	North America ISBN
1	November 19, 2006	978-4-59-218423-2	March 17, 2009	978-1-42781-445-6
Scenes 1–5
Keidai Saeki is a seventeen-year-old Japanese male who retains memories of his past life as a Pompeian gladiator named Sirix. Keidai is reunited with the reincarnation of Serena, Sirix's wife, who has been reborn as a male named Yuuma Ujoh. Keidai is conflicted with his feelings for Serena and Yuuma's gender and his feelings for his female best friend Mii Serizawa, who was Sirix's male friend in her past life. At school, Mii decides to host a play based on Keidai's past life and has him star as Sirix while Yuuma stars as Serena. Yuuma, who notices Mii's romantic affection towards Keidai, tricks her into playing Serena instead. Keidai breaks down while reacting the scene where Sirix leaves Serena and is comforted by Mii.
2	April 19, 2007	978-4-59-218424-9	July 6, 2009	978-1-42781-446-3
Scenes 6–11
Yuuma decides to show off to his friends by asking Mii out on a date, and coaxes Keidai to follow them. Later, Keidai's family and friends go to an onsen and a ghost attempts to seduce Keidai by possessing Yuuma, then Mii. The ghost is rejected from Mii's body when it attempts to confess its love to Keidai. Mii does not appear at school the next day, prompting Keidai and Yuuma to look for her at home. Before entering the house, they dress up as girls to get past Mii's overly protective father, and discover Mii is bedridden with a cold. At school, Keidai's class gets a male trainee teacher, Shinogu Kagami, who is Yuuma's cousin and the reincarnation of Serena's elder sister, Smyrna.
3	September 19, 2007	978-4-59-218425-6	November 3, 2009	978-1-42781-447-0
Scenes 12–17
Keidai and his family and friends are cherry blossom viewing. There, Keidai meets a girl named Reina Sakakibara who physically resembles Serena. Before the girl leaves, she addresses Keidai as Sirix. Mii later asks Keidai and Yuuma to help her parents finish their manga before the deadline. Keidai's school hosts a sports tournament with Keidai and Yuuma are playing volleyball. Yuuma swears that he will profess his feelings to Mii and end their friendship if he defeats Keida in the tournament. Yuuma collapses mid-game and meets Serena in a dream. When he wakes up, he is only able to recall Serena's advice, reminding him on how much he values his friendship with Keidai and Mii.
4	January 18, 2008	978-4-59-218494-2	February 2, 2010	978-1-42781-448-7
Scenes 18–23
Reina transfers to Keidai's school which causes tension between him and his classmates. On the way home, Keidai runs into Shuna Sakakibara, the reincarnation of Aglaia who was Sirix's lord. Reina reveals that Shuna is her older sister and had just recently lost her memories of Pompeii. They are brought to the Sakakibara household where they meet Souichi Mikage, the reincarnation of Delos, a mercenary who betrayed Aglaia. Together, they attempt to restore Shuna's memories of Pompeii causing her to angrily rebuke their efforts. Keidai shares his insecurities about losing his memories with Mii who promises to retell Keidai's stories of Pompeii if he ever forgets. After Yuuma and Reina fail a test, Keidai and Shinogu offer to tutor them. The next day, Keidai and his friends go to the pool and Shinogu meets Souichi.
5	June 19, 2008	978-4-59-218585-7	April 27, 2010	978-1-42781-692-4
Scenes 24–29
Reina reveals her unrequited feelings towards Shouichi and is comforted by Mii. Next, Keidai and his friends re-stage the Pompeii play for a charity fundraiser. Yuuma begins to wonder what Keidai and his friends are hiding from him so he accepts Reina's proposal to a hypnosis that will allow him to discover his past life. Serena's memories takes over and Reina forces him play as Serena in the play. In Yuuma's mind, Serena convinces Yuuma to stop pursuing the memories he does not need and he regains consciousness shortly after.
6	September 19, 2008	978-4-59-218586-4	June 29, 2010	978-1-42781-693-1
Scenes 30–35
Keidai goes with Mii to an amusement park and is secretly tailed by her father. He expresses disdain towards Keidai's conflicted feelings towards Mii and is rebuked by Keidai who promises to treasure her forever. The next day, Keidai and his friends gather at the Sakakibara household to deduce the cause of Shuna's amnesia. Souichi reminisces about his first meeting with Shuna and concludes she wanted to forget him. Shuna and Yuuma are missing from the party prompting Keidai and his friends to search for the two. Souichi finds them and sends Yuuma off to speak with Shuna privately. He proclaims he no longer belongs to Aglaia but to Shuna before kissing her.
7	January 19, 2009	978-4-59-218587-1	December 12, 2010	978-1-42781-763-1
Scenes 36–40; Past Life Version: A Fragment of a Wish (前世編 願いのカケラ, Zensei-hen Negai no Kakera)
Keidai, Mii, and Yuuma, take Reina with them to a recreational center to help her get over Souichi. Keidai and Reina both agree they should move on with their lives before Keidai passes out from a fever. Keidai dreams about the river of Styx where the ferryman tells him to move on from his past prompting Keidai to acknowledge his feelings for Mii. Later, Keidai's mother, Saeki, runs away from home when she hears Keidai's father, Shuugo, say Aria's name in his sleep. He remedies the misunderstanding by explaining the named belonged to his cat. Mii meanwhile reminisces about her first meeting with Keidai. At school Kiyohiko Kotomiya, Mii's middle school friend, enrolls into her class. While the two bond, Kiyohiko kisses Mii as Keidai watches in shock.
8	March 19, 2009	978-4-59-218588-8	December 28, 2010	978-1-42781-764-8
Scenes 41–46
Keidai begins to avoid Mii while suppressing his feelings towards her. His friends force him to attend a trip with Mii's drama club on the beach to remedy their relationship. As Mii confronts him on the issue, Keidai kisses her causing her to avoid him for the rest of the day. Keidai confesses to his friends about his feelings for Mii and opts to move on from the past. However, he realizes his memories begin to fade if he attempts to move on and decides he must retain his memories for failing to protect Serena. Keidai reminisces about his past life as Sirix during the last days of Pompeii. Agalia is framed by Delos for murder under the orders of the House of Britius. As Sirix discovers this, he attempts to free Agalia but Mount Vesuvius erupts along the way.
9	June 19, 2009	978-4-59-218589-5	April 12, 2011	1-4278-1836-3
Scenes 47–51; Side Story: The Dream of a Garnet (番外編 ガーネットが見る夢, Bangai-hen Gānetto ga Miru Yume); Side Story: Memories of the End (番外編 終わりの記憶, Bangai-hen Owari no Kioku); Side Story: Nice Going Life (番外編 Nice Going ライフ, Bangai-hen Nice Going Raifu)
Sirix leaves Serena in the midst of the eruption in order to save Aglaia and Loleus. As his friends begin to die one by one, Sirix swears to never forgive himself for failing to protect them before dying in the eruption. In the present, Yuuma demands Keidai to forgo his attachments to Pompeii. Keidai refuses and is put into a coma by a falling prop. In the coma, Keidai is able to become Sirix and is given the choice to stay with Serena or re-attempt to save his friends. He asks Tina, Reina's past incarnation, to stay by Serena's side and returns control to Sirix. Keidai's actions allows Serena to find Sirix in the final moments of Pompeii putting Sirix's memories to rest. Keidai awakens from the coma, acknowledging his past is settled, confesses his feelings to Mii and begins a relationship with her.

== Reception ==
The sixth volume of NG Life was ranked 25th on the Tohan charts between January 20 and 26, 2009. Erin Jones of Mania.com commented on the unoriginal plot and typical shōjo art but praised the characters' distinctive designs and the art sense used to convey dramatic scenes. He concludes that the character relationships are the "selling point" of the series. GraphicNovelReporter.com's Courtney Kraft comments that the art style is adequate but criticizes the "kookyness" citing the drama at the end of volume one was necessary to balance it. Comics Worth Reading's Johanna Draper Carlson heavily panned the manga for its art and "two-dimensional characters that are predictable and uninteresting."
