= Aion (video game) =

2008 video game

Aion: The Tower of Eternity
- Developer: NCSoft
- Publishers: WW: NCSoft; EU: Gameforge
- Director: Yongchan Jee
- Producer: Wonsik Woo
- Designer: Yongchan Jee
- Programmers: Maro Shim; Hyungsuk Kang
- Artist: Hyungjun Kim
- Composers: InRo Joo; Ryo Kunihiko
- Engine: CryEngine
- Platform: Microsoft Windows
- Release: KOR: November 25, 2008; NA: September 22, 2009; AU: September 23, 2009; EU/RSA: September 25, 2009
- Genre: Massively multiplayer online role-playing game
- Mode: Multiplayer

Aion: The Tower of Eternity (Korean: 아이온: 영원의 탑) is a massively multiplayer online role-playing game (MMORPG) developed and published by the South Korean company NCSoft. The game combines PvP and PvE (a concept the developers call PvPvE) in a fantasy game environment. As of May 2009, Aion had 3.5 million subscribers in Asia. AION's first major expansion pack was released to North America and Europe on September 7, 2010 under the name Aion: Assault on Balaurea. Truly Free launched on April 11, 2012 with no restrictions. The second major expansion was released in North America on June 26, 2013 under the name Aion: Dark Betrayal. Its most recent expansion was launched on July 13, 2016 under the name Aion: Echoes of Eternity.

Aion got a sequel by the name of Aion 2 which released globally on October 5, 2026 on Steam.

== Gameplay ==
=== Skill chains ===
Many of the skills acquired as characters progress may only be performed in a certain order, or chain. Generally the skills located farther along in the chain are more powerful than those at the beginning, or those that have no prerequisite.

=== PvPvE system ===
The PvPvE gameplay of Aion revolves around battles within the Abyss and Balaurea (PvP zones). Within these zones are fortresses which can be controlled by individual Legions (the Aion equivalent of Guilds). Battle to control these castles involves combat against players of the opposing faction and computer controlled NPCs at the same time, using siege weapons obtained from PvE raid content. Legions in control of a castle are entitled to funding from taxes and players within the faction get specials from NPCs and discounts for travel and vendor items. The game currently does not allow factions to fight against those of their own race, except for casual duels or in the Arena, or Panesterra.

=== PvP Battlegrounds ===
Before the introduction of Glory Point system, the participation in PvP was rewarded with Abyss Points in the game. The game ranks players as battles are won against fellow players based on their participation in the Abyss and Balaurea. Certain items can be purchased with these points such as high-end armor and weapons. This was referred to as the Abyss Rank system, and there can only be a limited number of high-ranking players per server. The highest-ranking players compete for the relatively few rank positions available. Players of a very high rank are also granted the ability to transform into what is known as a Guardian General, a form that bestows an exceedingly large boost to certain stats. Abyss Points are gained by killing other players in combat, and points are lost by being killed by another player. Higher points were awarded for a kill of a much higher ranked player than for killing an equal or lower ranked player. Abyss Points can also be earned by completing certain quests and by selling certain items.

In 4.5 patch, a new Glory Point system was introduced. It replaced the Abyss Point ranking system, turning Abyss Points into a currency to be spent instead of a factor that defined player's rank. The players can get these Glory Points from sieges or PvP and PvE instances. Player cannot get these points from killing the opposite faction. Glory Points are not usable as currency to buy new items and weapons, but they do decrease a certain amount daily, and the number of lost points depends on the player's rank.

=== Classes ===
Character customization in Aion

There are six subclasses, and twelve main classes in the game. Players start the game by choosing one of the six primary classes: Warrior, Mage, Scout, Priest, Technist or Muse. After attaining level 10, the player must choose from two specialized classes associated with their chosen class. Warriors may become a Templar or a Gladiator; Mages may become a Sorcerer or Spiritmaster; Scouts may become an Assassin or Ranger; Priests may become a Cleric or a Chanter; Technists may become a Gunslinger or Aethertech; and a Muse will become a Songweaver or Vandal (as of the new update 7.0).

=== Grouping ===
Up to six players may form a group, to assist one another in battle, and share the benefits of victory. Certain areas are designed for group play and a group is required to enter some areas in the game. Up to four groups may form an Alliance for situations that call for greater force of numbers. Eight Alliances may combine to form a League, allowing for a total of 192 players participating in a given activity.

=== Crafting ===
The base process involves learning a particular form of crafting, of which there are seven in Aion: weaponsmithing, armorsmithing, handcrafting, tailoring, alchemy, cooking, and construction. Players can learn all seven crafting professions, but can be an Expert in only two, and a Master in only one.

Any item that can be crafted is actually composed of several individual components, or materials. The player can either learn which materials are needed for a particular item automatically or via purchase of the design. Generally these materials must be purchased from vendors or from other players, gathered out in the wild (via collection or extraction), crafted already, or morphed, but not everything can be crafted.

=== Flight ===
There are many aspects to flight in Aion, which plays a vital role in Travel, Combat, Quests, and Crafting. Flying is only permitted in certain areas, known as flight zones. Flight is initially limited to 60 seconds but can be increased with various armor, titles, and other items in-game, especially wings, that can be obtained from level 10 on. A player may also use potions during flight which add to his or her remaining flight time, up to the current maximum. However, the most important aspect is gliding, which unlike actual flying is possible everywhere in the game (with very few exceptions) and allows to easily cross chasms or slopes that would otherwise block the player's path.

=== Quests ===
There are three type of quests in Aion: ordinary quests, campaign quests and Work Orders. Ordinary quests require the player to complete a task to receive a reward. Campaign quests are focused on story, and are crucial for player progression. Work Orders are used to increase skill in a chosen profession. Some quests are repeatable. Some quests, especially campaign quests, cannot be shared or abandoned.

=== Mounts ===
Mounts can be obtained through world boss drops, quests, crafting, guestblooms, events and Cash Shop. When not in a fight, a player can mount to not only move faster by default, but also being able to sprint, which means moving at flight speed by also consuming the player's flight time. They can remain on their mount as long as they are not attacked by another player or monster. Mounts can be crafted with some difficulty, as the materials needed are hard to come by. NC West has sold materials to craft mounts on their real money store.

== Plot ==
=== Backstory ===
When the god Aion created the world of Atreia, he created the Drakan—powerful dragon-like beasts tasked with safeguarding the humans; performing Aion's will on the planet; and protecting the Tower of Eternity, Aion's physical presence on Atreia. For a time, the Drakan obeyed Aion, but over the time, they began to enjoy their power, ignoring their duties and abusing the humans who inhabited Atreia. Aion took notice, creating the twelve Empyrean Lords in response. Angelic in appearance, the Empyrean Lords were demigods who walked amongst humans, and used a force called "Aether" to create a powerful barrier, later to be called an aetheric field, around the Tower of Eternity, protecting all of those within. While the outside world continued to be ravaged by the Drakan, who had become the more ferocious Balaur, the humans within the barrier managed to tap into the Aether, gaining their own powers. In time, they would become known as the Daeva.

As time went on, the Lords decided that they had to be more aggressive in stopping the Balaur. With the number of Daeva growing, the Lords decided to form an army, with ten of the Empyrean Lords leading the Daeva into battle, while the remaining two, Siel and Israphel, protected the Tower of Eternity (thus earning the title "Tower Lords"). This conflict between the Balaur and the Empyrean Lords would come to be known as the Millennium War, which led to no real progress by any side. As the war progressed, a faction of Lords began to view the war as unwinnable, and Lord Israphel proposed a discussion of peace with the Balaur. This surprise proposal drew criticism from within the faction; after a lengthy and heated debate, seven of the twelve Lords became the winning majority to move forward with the plan.

However, for reasons unclear, the negotiation failed. When the Balaur arrived at the Tower of Eternity, a commotion broke out, killing a Balaurian captain; the remaining Balaur, enraged, marched upon and destroyed the Tower, which set off a chain reaction that threatened to destroy the planet, but Israphel and Siel made the ultimate sacrifice and gave their own lives to protect Atreia. The world was shattered into two "hemi-shells", with a dark Abyss lying between them, but it was held together by the aetheric field created from the Tower Lords' sacrifice.

While the Balaur were banished to the Abyss, the Empyrean Lords found themselves in conflict with each other. Two groups were formed as a result, each with five Lords; the Seraphim, who had proposed the peace solution and blamed the others for sabotaging the peace negotiations by failing to agree to them; and the Shedim, who blamed the Seraphim, believing that their weakness and their proposing of the peace talk allowed the Balaur to gain the upper hand. From that day on, the two sides became bitter enemies.

The Shedim migrated to Asmodae, the dark and harsh upper, inner half of the planet, while the Seraphim Lords settled in Elysea, the light and abundant bottom half. They both took their humans and Daeva with them, and over time, they adapted to their respective new worlds and declared the opposing side their mortal enemies. Those in Asmodae became the Asmodians, rugged survivors, gaining dark features and a fierce loyalty to their kin. Those in Elysea became the Elyos, growing even more beautiful and believing themselves to be Aion's chosen people (although they have grown arrogant). From that day on, they would wage war for centuries as bloody enemies.

== Development ==
Aion was first unveiled at the May 2006 E3 Expo. It was developed at NCsoft's software design studio in South Korea. The Korean closed beta test began in late 2007, followed by an open beta test in November 2008. A localized Chinese version began closed beta testing in December 2008, with open testing beginning on April 8, 2009.

The game was then localized for Western markets, including North America, Europe, and Australia. NCsoft held six weekend long closed beta tests for North American and European players beginning in June 2009. An open beta began that September. During the course of this open beta, the anti-cheat program GameGuard was removed. GameGuard is used in many Asian-market games to stop botting and cheating, but was abandoned for Western markets due to a range of issues experienced during the open beta. Casting and voice production were redone for the Western market by Blindlight.

== Expansions ==
=== Aion: Assault on Balaurea ===
Released on September 7, 2010, this expansion evolves the game's story and terrain as it expands the game world of Atreia far beyond the traditional territories of Asmodae and Elysea. In this expansion, both sides take the fight against the invading Balaur to their homeland of Balaurea. Players will receive new challenges; novel and updated instances and zones; an increased level capacity from 50 to 55; and fresh weapons, items, skills, and flight mechanics. The expansion also introduces functional pets equipped with in-game benefits that will rapidly become constant character companions.

While Assault on Balaurea is a free expansion for NA and EU players, NCsoft released a retail box version with bonus content such as an in-game pet, which varies depending on retailer.

=== Aion: The Promised Lands / 3.0 Ascension ===
Released on October 19, 2011, The Promised Lands (Ascension in NA) takes Aion further into Balaurea, including areas where opposing factions must work together with the Reians to drive the Balaur back into Tiamaranta, where players face Dragon Lord Tiamat in her fortress. With new quests, instances and game mechanics (including a new level cap of 60), players encounter a wide array of new PvP and PvE armor sets and weapons with a wider level of customization than before.

=== Aion 4.0: Dark Betrayal ===
Released on June 26, 2013, Dark Betrayal features two new classes, the Gunslinger and the Songweaver, as well as three new zones, Katalam, Danaria, and Idian Depths, as well as increasing the level cap to 65.

The 4.5 "Steel Cavalry" patch, released in January 2014, added another class, the Aethertech, who utilize "magical mechanical mounts to unleash both short- and long-distance attacks", according to a press release by NCSoft.

=== Aion 4.8: Upheaval ===
Released on June 17, 2015, Upheaval features two new zones, Cygnea and Enshar, new skills for each class in the game, and a lot of the user interfaces within the game were revamped, such as the skills UI. The Stigma system also got revamped in the update along with other changes to the game, including the deletion of a few maps that are no longer available.

=== Aion 5.0, 5.1 ,5.3: Echoes of Eternity ===
Released on July 13, 2016, Echoes of Eternity features two new zones, Iluma and Norsvold, an increase in level cap to 75, a change in the appearance and mechanic UIs, especially concerning the upgrading mechanism, and added the "Archdaeva" storyline and mechanic.

=== Aion 6.0: Refly ===
Released on January 17, 2018, Refly features a new zone, Lakrum, available to both races and changes the order of fields. The update increases the level cap to 80 and removes the High Daeva system. A companion was also introduced, which will accompany the character during their development, and the elimination of 6 maps and the abyss.

=== Aion 6.5: Frozen Relic ===
Released on July 11, 2018, Frozen Relic introduces three new instances: Senekta, Hererim Mine and Illumiel.

=== Aion 7.0: New Season ===
Released on November 28, 2018, New Season introduces a new region, Dumaha, as well as a new class after five years, the Painter.

=== Aion 7.2: Shadows over Red Katalam ===
Released on May 22, 2019, Shadows over Red Katalam introduces a new region, Red Katalam.

=== Aion 7.5: Land of Storm ===
Released on November 20, 2019.

=== Aion 7.7: Silentera: Secret Sword ===
Released on April 8, 2020.

=== Aion 7.9 ===
Released on October 29, 2020, Reintroduced an overhauled Pangaea as a seasonal legion battle.

=== Aion 8.0: Aspharanta: Holy War ===
Released on April 21, 2021, Aspharanta: Sanctuary introduces a new region, Aspharanta.

=== Aion 8.2: Conquest ===
Released on September 8, 2021.

=== Aion 8.2: Grace ===
Released on September 21, 2022.

=== Aion 8.4: Aspharanta: Leap ===
Released on April 5, 2023, Aspharanta: Leap introduces a new region, Apsu's Forgotten Ruins.

After this update, the different distributions of the game diverged in the naming convention. The EU version continued the naming style of version number + version name, the korean version changed to a continuous update system and the NA version stopped using numbered updates.

=== Aion Origin ===
Nomenclature changed on November 13,2024. After the update 8.4 Aspharanta: Leap, the korean version of the game changed its naming structure from numbered live versions to a continuous update style under Origin.

=== Aion 8.5: The Return of Vaizel & Triniel ===
Released on the EU version on May 21, 2025. In the NA version, this update was called Allos Cosmos Update and released on Mar 18, 2025.

=== Aion 8.6: Raksha’s Revenge ===
Released on the EU version on Mar 11, 2026. In the NA version, this update was called Burning Citadel of the Sacred and released on Mar 31, 2026.

== Music ==
The official Aion: The Tower of Eternity Original Soundtrack was released as a single CD featuring 22 tracks written by composer Yang Bang-Ean (also known as Kunihiko Ryo in Japan). The soundtrack was released in Japan and Korea on October 21, 2008, and in North America and Europe as part of the Collector's Edition. The soundtrack was also released on iTunes on October 20, 2009.

AION ~ The Tower Of Eternity ~ track list
No.	Title	Length
1.	"The Tower of Eternity"	4:01
2.	"The Wings of Knight" (original version)	2:54
3.	"A Fairy of The Peace"	4:30
4.	"Kingdom of Light"	4:30
5.	"Song of Moonlight"	3:24
6.	"Solid State Battle"	3:06
7.	"Death Waltz"	2:44
8.	"Magma & Beast"	3:14
9.	"Blue Forest"	3:13
10.	"Forgotten Sorrow" (English version)	4:02
11.	"Step to The Next World"	3:20
12.	"Darkness in Your Heart" (Korean version)	3:28
13.	"Voices from The Ruins"	4:35
14.	"Attack The Unsion"	2:17
15.	"Arabesque"	2:12
16.	"Dream of The Shepherd"	2:59
17.	"Red Land"	3:40
18.	"Dark's Innocence"	3:30
19.	"Raging Strings"	3:23
20.	"Flying Dragon"	3:20
21.	"Heaven's Gate"	3:21
22.	"Forgotten Sorrow"	3:55
Total length:		72 minutes

The second official album called "AION – Annales of Atreia" was released on May 10, 2010 via the iTunes Store for $9.99 USD. Composers Inro Joo and Wonki Kim created the original soundtrack with the Czech National Symphony Orchestra.

Aion – Annales of Atreia ~ track list
No.	Title	Length
1.	"Prologue – Birth"	1:39
2.	"Chapter 1 – Dawn"	1:19
3.	"Chapter 2 – Becoming"	3:36
4.	"Chapter 3 – Conspiracy"	3:28
5.	"Chapter 4 – Collapse"	2:12
6.	"Chapter 5 – Disruption"	1:17
7.	"Chapter 6 – Deva's Marcia"	2:53
8.	"Chapter 7 – Blessed Land"	2:57
9.	"Chapter 8 – Darkened Land"	2:23
10.	"Chapter 9 – Abyss"	1:56
11.	"Chapter 10 – Banned Reunion"	1:31
12.	"Chapter 11 – Chaos"	2:36
13.	"Chapter 12 – Irreversible 1000 Years: Tchaikovsky Homage"	2:32
14.	"Chapter 13 – Aion, Chapter 14 – Quietude"	2:41
15.	"Chapter 15 – Annales of Atreia: Main Theme"	5:44
16.	"Chapter 16 – Epilogue – Deva's Oratorio"	3:28
17.	"Shugo Medley" (bonus track)	5:36
Total length:		47.7 minutes

== Release ==
- South Korea: Aion was released in South Korea on November 25, 2008, making this the first country to get a final release of the game. Given the success of NCsoft's previous games, Lineage and Lineage II, Aion had been a highly anticipated game in South Korea ever since its announcement.
- China: The game was released in China on April 16, 2009 and operated by Shanda Interactive Entertainment.
- Japan: NCsoft released the game on July 17, 2009 in Japan under NCsoft Japan. As of February 2010, Pixiv collaborated with NCsoft for a special fan art contest.
- Australia: NCsoft is distributing Aion in Australia through QV Software, and was released on September 22, 2009. In Australia, 3 editions were released: Collectors Edition, Limited Edition, and the Standard Edition. The game is also being distributed via Valve's digital distribution platform, Steam, within this region.
- Taiwan: NCsoft began an open beta of Aion in Taiwan on June 7, 2009, and was released on July 21. v1.5 was released on October 21 of the same year. v2.0 was released on October 13, 2010, followed by v2.1 on November 24.
- Europe: NCsoft released the final version of Aion in Europe on September 25, 2009. In Europe, Aion was available in two editions: Standard Edition and Collectors Edition. The latter includes many in-game items, figurines, posters, and the Official Aion Soundtrack CD by composer Yang Bang-Ean (known as Ryo Kunihiko in Japan).
- North America: Aion was released in North America on September 22, 2009. The release was accompanied by a free comic book from Wildstorm, Aiva's Story by writers David Noonan and Ricardo Sanchez, with art by Neil Googe for those who preordered. Also for those who preordered gained a 3 day head start before launch. Aion was in available in two editions: Standard Edition and Collectors Edition. The latter includes many in-game items, figurines, posters, and the Official Aion Soundtrack CD by composer Yang Bang-Ean (known as Ryo Kunihiko in Japan). The game was made available through retailers for DVD purchase, and via download from NCsoft, Steam, Gamestop's website, File Planet and Direct2Drive.
- Russia: Aion's open beta ran on December 8, 2009. In Russia, Aion is supposed to use a mixed payment model with monthly subscription and additional payments for in-game items and benefits.

== Sales and revenue ==
Aion was the biggest MMO release in recent years according to NCsoft, with 400,000 pre-orders in the US. The game generated 40.6 billion won ($32.7 million) in the fiscal quarter in South Korea, Taiwan, China, and Japan. In China, over 1 million players logged in within the first four days of release.

On its western release, Aion became the best-selling PC game of September 2009. It also managed to remain at No. 1 on both the Steam and Direct2Drive charts for several weeks. By that November, the game had sold nearly 1 million copies in the west, with 500,000 units sold in the US and 470,000 units in Europe. The success of Aion resulted in NCsoft's quarterly revenues to rise 112% for a total of $142 million.

== Reception ==
Reception

Aggregate score
Aggregator	Score
Metacritic	76/100

Review scores
Publication	Score
Eurogamer	7/10
G4	4/5
GameSpot	6.5/10
GameSpy	3.5/5
GameZone	8/10
IGN	8.5/10
PC Gamer (US)	70/100
PC Zone	80/100
X-Play	4/5
Gameplanet	9.0/10

Awards
Publication	Award
RPGLand.com	Best MMORPG RPGs of the Year 2009
MMORPG.com	Best New Game; MMORPG.com 2009 Awards
Gamescom	Best Online Game; 2009 Gamescom Awards
PAX	Best MMO; 2009 Inside Gaming’s Best MMO of PAX
Korean Game Awards	Best Korean Game of the Year – 2008

Aion has received generally positive responses from professional reviewers. Review aggregator website Metacritic lists an average review score of 76/100. Positive reviews have cited that Aion provides a "refreshing look" from an artistic perspective and a "great first impression", with a lot of polish and balance. IGN states that Aion "tries to offer something for everyone and succeeds at it, albeit in varying degrees and at different stages".

Negative reviews focus on the game's tendency towards "grinding" and its lack of innovative features. GameSpot's review noted that the first levels of the game were "fast-paced and intuitive", but that grinding "quickly became obtrusive". X-Play reviewed that "after a few hours it'll become apparent that there isn't much radically different here". GameSpot also noted that the servers appeared to be unable to handle the number of players involved in large-scale PVP.

== Notes ==
1.Blog post listing "Life Leafs" (sic) as a purchasable item in the real money store. "Life Leafs" are used in crafting mounts.

== See also ==
Aion 2 (Sequel)
