= Shinpei Kusanagi =

Abstract painter (born 1973)

Shinpei Kusanagi (born 1973) is a Japanese painter working in Tokyo, Japan, noted for his improvisational brushstrokes and abstract landscapes.

== Career ==
Kusanagi relies on a technique reminiscent of traditional Japanese nijimi, in which he stains untreated canvas with layers of translucent color. He then incorporates improvisational brushstrokes, drawing on the tension between motion and stillness. Kusanagi’s landscapes evoke familiar urban and natural scenes; his use of atmospheric color transforms the everyday environs into something new and unknown.

Earlier in his career, Kusanagi published illustrated drawings to accompany a serialized novel. These representational works anchor his abstractions.

== Key exhibitions ==
- 2021 Altman Siegel, San Francisco, CA
- 2018 Taka Ishii Gallery, Tokyo, Japan
- 2017 Museum of Contemporary Art (Group Exhibition), Tokyo, Japan
- 2011 Opera City Art Gallery, Tokyo, Japan
- 2007 Gallery Sora, Tokyo, Japan
- 2006 Bankart Studio, Yokohama, Japan

== Public collections ==
Kusanagi’s work is included in the Frederick R. Weisman Art Foundation, KKR Japan, the LOEWE Foundation, the Los Angeles County Museum of Art, the Museum of Contemporary Art Tokyo, The Rachofsky Collection, the Swiss Re Collection, and The UBS Art Collection.

== Awards and residencies ==
- 2002 "The choice," Grand Prix of the year
- 2002 Finalist of "Philip Morris Art Award: The First Move"
