= Yang Bang-ean =

Zainichi Korean composer (born 1960)

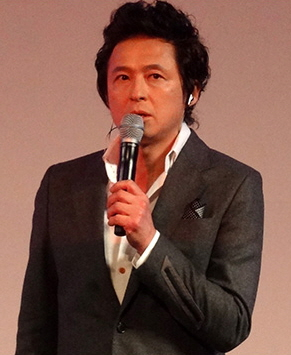

Background information
- Born: January 1, 1960 (age 66); Tokyo, Japan
- Occupations: Composer, arranger, record producer, and pianist
- Instrument: Piano
- Website: Official website

- Yang Bang-ean
- Hangul: 양방언
- Hanja: 梁邦彦
- RR: Yang Bangeon
- MR: Yang Pangŏn
- Japanese name: Kunihiko Ryō (梁邦彦)

Yang Bang-ean (Korean: 양방언; Hanja: 梁邦彦; born January 1, 1960) is a Zainichi Korean composer, arranger, record producer, and pianist. His Japanese name is Kunihiko Ryo.

== Early life and education ==
Yang Bang-ean was born in Tokyo, Japan, as the youngest son of five children in a Zainichi Korean family. His father (born in Jeju-do, South Korea) worked as a doctor; his mother (born in Sinuiju, North Korea) worked as a nutritionist at a hospital that her husband owned. Yang started his early education at the Chōsen School (朝鮮学校, 조선학교), where he completed his primary and secondary education. He then proceeded to a Japanese high school, where he first became interested in foreign pop and rock music while listening to the radio, which led to him joining a band. He continued his study at Nippon Medical School, where he first started playing the keyboard. The band traveled around holding concerts and releasing an album. After his graduation from Nippon Medical School, he was employed as a plastic surgeon in a hospital in Tokyo, but quit shortly after to become a musician.

== Personal life ==
His father named him Yang Bang-ean (양방언, 梁邦彦, Japanese name: Kunihiko Ryō), a name which has three meanings: Yang(梁), symbolizing the family line; Bang (邦), representing many countries- reflecting his dad's wish him to interact with people worldwide; and Ean (彦), a common character in Japanese names to respect Japanese sentiment as the family was living in the country. At the one of interviews in 2007, he stated that the only thing he regretted when he became a successful artist was that his father had to pass away before his success as a musician.

Yang Bang-ean had lived with North Korean nationality for over 30 years. However, he had to give up his North Korean citizenship in 1999, as it was difficult to work overseas while holding such citizenship.

Yang Bang-ean first met his wife at a party she was hosting. He married her when he was in his mid-thirties after being in a relationship for approximately 10 years. He currently lives in Karuizawa, Nagano, to relax from busy city life and concentrate on music.

== Discography ==
- (1988–1989) Arranged the music for one of the closing themes of Dennou Keisatsu Cybercop.
- (1991) Composed the soundtrack to NTV TV-drama "Aisazu ni iranai" starring Eisaku Yoshida.
- (1992) Co-produced the album Continue the Revolution.
- (1995) Composed the theme song and other music for the Jackie Chan film Thunderbolt (also known as Dead Heat).
- (October 1995) Produced the theme song Everlasting Truth for TBS TV program Mireba nattoku!.
- (1995) Composed the theme music for Fist of Fury.
- (July 28, 1997) Released his debut album The Gate of Dreams.
- (September 18, 1997) Released the single Wings of Mirage, which was used as the theme song of the TV Asahi show Super Morning.
- (1998) Released the second official album Into The Light.
- (November 19, 1999) Released the third official album Only Heaven Knows.
- (May 16, 2001) Released the fourth official album Pan-O-Rama.
- (2002) Released the OST album of The Twelve Kingdoms.
- (May 27, 2002) Released the piano solo album Piano sketch.
- (May 14, 2004) Released the fifth official album Echoes.
- (2004–2005) Arranged the ending theme of Fantastic Children.
- (October 28, 2005) Released the OST album of Emma - A Victorian Romance.
- (July 24, 2006) Released the OST album of a KBS documentary KBS 스페셜 도자기.
- (2006-2007) Composed the Original Soundtrack and the opening for the TV anime series The Story of Saiunkoku.
- (January 17, 2007) Contributed to the OST album of Yobi, the Five Tailed Fox.
- (March 29, 2007) Composed the music for the live-action film Beyond the Years.
- (August 16, 2007) Released the OST album of Emma - A Victorian Romance: Second Act.
- (November 16, 2007) Released the OST album of a KBS documentary KBS 스페셜 차마고도.
- (October 21, 2008) Released the official Aion: The Tower of Eternity original soundtrack, featuring 22 tracks. The soundtrack was later released on iTunes on October 20, 2009.
- (October 19, 2009) Released the sixth official album Timeless Story.
- (2009–2011) Composed the music for the anime series Tegami Bachi.
- (2011) Composed the music for the anime series Level E.
- (November 10, 2011) Released the first special album Floating Circle.
- (October 16, 2013) Released the OST album of the MMORPG ASTA.
- (2014-2015) Composed the original soundtrack and the opening theme for the TV anime series Yona of the Dawn.
- (December 17, 2015) Released the Seventh official album Embrace.
- (October 12, 2016) Released the best album The Best.
- (October 27, 2017) Composed the Olympic games is "Echos For Pyeongchang".
- (August 5, 2021) Released the Dark Ark OST album.
- (November 30, 2021) Released the live special album Light and Shadow.
- (November 20, 2022) Released the New Single Neo Utopia.
