= Mizuho Kusanagi =

Japanese manga artist

- 草凪 みずほ
- Pronunciation: くさなぎ みずほ
- Born: February 3, 1979 (age 47); Kumamoto, Japan
- Occupation: Manga artist
- Years active: 2003–present
- Notable work: Yona of the Dawn

Mizuho Kusanagi (草凪 みずほ, Kusanagi Mizuho; born February 3, 1979) is a Japanese manga artist from Kumamoto, Japan. She is mainly known for her work, Yona of the Dawn (暁のヨナ, Akatsuki no Yona).

== Career ==
Kusanagi's debut series, Yoiko no Kokoroe, was published in 2003 and serialized in Hakusensha's shōjo magazine, Hana to Yume. In 2009, Kusanagi's longest-running series, Yona of the Dawn began serialization in Hana to Yume. Yona of the Dawn has remained as her most popular series and was adapted into an anime in 2014 by Studio Pierrot, receiving a 24-episode series, an OVA episode in 2015, and an adaptation of the Zeno Arc in 2016.

== Works ==
- Yoiko no Kokoroe (よいこの心得) (2003–2007) – one-shot, later serialized in Hakusensha's Hana to Yume
- Mugen Spiral (夢幻スパイラル) (2004) – serialized in Hana to Yume
- Game × Rush (ゲーム×ラッシュ) (2005) – serialized in Hana to Yume
- NG Life (NGライフ) (2006–2009) – serialized in Hana to Yume
- Yona of the Dawn (暁のヨナ) (2009–2025) – serialized in Hana to Yume
- Kuroorihime to Kawaki no Ou (黒檻姫と渇きの王) (2011) – one-shot published in The Hana to Yume
- Boku no Kotori-san (僕の小鳥さん) (2014) – one-shot published in The Hana to Yume

== Awards ==
In 2002, Kusanagi's work Goshin Kyoudai ga Yuku!? (御神兄弟がゆく!?) came second in the 27th Hakusensha Athena New Face Award. The following year, she won the 28th Hakusensha Athena New Face Award for Outstanding Debut with Yoiko no Kokoroe. Yona of the Dawn has been awarded with Hakusensha's Denshi Shoseki Taishō (E-Book Award) which is given to the best-selling digital manga in 2015 and 2021.
