= Yona of the Dawn =

Japanese manga series by Mizuho Kusanagi

- First tankōbon volume cover, featuring Yona

暁のヨナ (Akatsuki no Yona)
- Genre: Adventure; Epic fantasy; Romance
- Manga
- Written by: Mizuho Kusanagi
- Published by: Hakusensha
- English publisher: NA: Viz Media
- Imprint: Hana to Yume Comics
- Magazine: Hana to Yume
- Original run: August 5, 2009 – December 19, 2025
- Volumes: 48
- Anime television series
- Directed by: Kazuhiro Yoneda
- Written by: Shinichi Inotsume
- Music by: Kunihiko Ryo
- Studio: Studio Pierrot
- Licensed by: Crunchyroll
- Original network: AT-X, Tokyo MX, Sun TV, TV Aichi, RKK, BS11
- Original run: October 7, 2014 – March 24, 2015
- Episodes: 24 + 3 OVAs
- Anime
- Studio: Pierrot Films
- icon

Yona of the Dawn (Japanese: 暁のヨナ, Hepburn: Akatsuki no Yona (Note: Subtitled The girl standing in the blush of dawn)) is a Japanese manga series written and illustrated by Mizuho Kusanagi. It was serialized in Hakusensha's shōjo manga magazine Hana to Yume from August 2009 to December 2025, with its chapters collected in 48 tankōbon volumes. The series is licensed for an English release in North America by Viz Media.

Set in an East Asian-inspired fantasy world, the story follows Princess Yona as she flees a coup in the fictional kingdom of Kouka and heralds on a journey to save Kouka from both invasion and internal collapse.

A 24-episode anime television series adaptation produced by Studio Pierrot aired between October 2014 and March 2015. A sequel produced by Pierrot Films has been announced.

== Plot ==
The series takes place in an East Asian-inspired fantasy world. Two thousand years ago, the nation of Kouka is founded by the Crimson Dragon God, Hiryuu, who descends from the heavens in human form as King Hiryuu. Over time, humans forsake their divine origins, succumbing to greed and corruption. As darkness threatens to consume the land, King Hiryuu faces near annihilation until four dragon-blooded warriors join him, purging Kouka of evil. Following his death, the warriors disperse, and their legacy shapes the nation into five tribes: Sky, Earth, Water, Wind, and Fire. Over centuries, these events fade into myth.

In the present, Princess Yona lives a sheltered life within the Crimson Dragon Castle under the rule of her pacifist father, King Il of the Sky Tribe. Her only companions are Hak, the Wind Tribe general and her bodyguard, and Su-won, her childhood friend and the son of King Il's late brother, Yu-hon. Despite the kingdom's fragile peace, unrest simmers beneath the surface.

Shortly before her sixteenth birthday, Yona confesses her desire to marry Su-won, only for King Il to forbid it. On the night of her celebration, she witnesses Su-won murder her father, revealing his orchestrated coup d'état. Forced to flee with Hak, they seek refuge in the Wind Tribe's capital, Fuuga. Guided by Hak's adoptive grandfather, the former general Son Mun-deok, they locate a priest exiled by Su-won's father. The priest recounts the legend of the Crimson Dragon King and his four dragon warriors. Inspired by the myth, Yona embarks on a quest to seek these warriors, determined to reclaim her kingdom and restore its future.

== Characters ==
=== Main characters ===
Yona (ヨナ)
Voiced by: Chiwa Saitō (Japanese); Monica Rial (English)
Yona, princess of Kouka and Crimson Dragon King's reincarnation, is bound to four dragon warriors by blood oath. After childhood friend Su-won murders her father King Il, she flees with bodyguard Hak, abandoning pacifism to protect her declining kingdom. Her journey to gather the dragon warriors eventually leads to an uneasy alliance with Su-won's regime when foreign powers threaten Kouka. Developing military skills, diplomacy, and a relationship with Hak, she attempts to negotiate with and later fights against the dragon gods to end her warriors' curse, despite the personal cost.
Hak (ソン・ハク, Son Haku)
Voiced by: Tomoaki Maeno, Ayahi Takagaki (young) (Japanese); Christopher R. Sabat (English)
Hak, Yona's childhood friend and bodyguard, is the former Wind Tribe general nicknamed "Thunder Beast" for his unmatched combat skills. Orphaned in a Xing-Kouka war, he was raised by General Son Mun-deok. After Su-won's coup falsely implicates him in King Il's murder, Hak's loyalty is torn between protecting Yona and coping with Su-won's betrayal—his former closest friend. Though initially rejecting Su-won's plan to make Yona his successor, Hak ultimately cooperates to defend Kouka. A master of the guandao, he also excels with bows, swords, and hand-to-hand combat.
Su-won (スウォン, Suwon)
Voiced by: Yūsuke Kobayashi, Nozomi Yamamoto (young) (Japanese); Micah Solusod (English)
Su-won, Kouka's current king and Yona's cousin, ascends to power after orchestrating King Il's assassination. Though once close to Yona and Hak, his belief that Il's weak rule endangered Kouka drives him to seize the throne. A strategic ruler who travels incognito to resolve tribal conflicts, he maintains Kouka's stability while concealing his terminal Crimson Illness. Despite initial hostility, he eventually allies with Yona's faction against external threats, planning to eventually cede his throne to her.
An Riri (アン・リリー, An Riri)
Riri, the Water Tribe chief's daughter and Yona's ally, leads anti-drug trafficking efforts in her territory. Initially distrusting Yona's group, she joins forces with them after they save her from traffickers. Their successful operation exposes corruption, though Hak's violent confrontation with Su-won strains relations. Exiled by her father, Riri continues her campaign in Sei, where she and Yona are captured and enslaved. Her courageous resistance during their escape earns public admiration and helps annex Sei. Becoming a bridge between Yona and Su-won's factions, she openly supports Yona while maintaining a friendship with Su-won. When war with Kai erupts, she helps defend Kuuto during the castle's destruction.
Yoon (ユン, Yun)
Voiced by: Junko Minagawa (Japanese); Clifford Chapin (English)
Yoon, an orphan raised by priest Ik-soo, joins Yona's group after rescuing them from a cliff fall. Skilled in medicine and cooking, his feminine appearance often draws teasing. Initially resentful toward nobles due to Ik-soo's banishment and his own poverty, he overcomes his prejudice after witnessing Yona's growth. As the group's medic, he forms a sibling-like bond with Yona. Though non-combatant, he can create explosives. When Yona allies with Su-won, Yoon befriends court physician Min-soo and aids Hak in seeking treatment for Su-won's terminal illness.

=== Dragon Warriors ===
Kija (キジャ)
Voiced by: Masakazu Morita, Haruka Chisuga (young) (Japanese); Ian Sinclair (English)
Kija, the White Dragon's descendant, possesses a powerful claw capable of cutting through anything. Raised in isolation by villagers who revered him, he eagerly joins Yona due to his ancestral loyalty to Hiryuu's legacy. His naive personality hides deep-seated trauma from his father's rejection—the previous White Dragon scarred him at birth. Though initially clashing with Hak over their differing personalities, they bond through shared devotion to Yona. Kija suppresses his romantic feelings for her to respect her relationship with Hak. Alongside the other dragons, he can summon protective shields for Yona in battle.
Shin-ah (シンア)
Voiced by: Nobuhiko Okamoto, Sanae Kobayashi (young) (Japanese); Eric Vale (English)
Shin-ah, the Blue Dragon inheritor, wields deadly eye powers feared by his village. Orphaned and nameless, he lived isolated until joining Yona's group, who accept him. Preferring swords to his paralyzing gaze, he fights alongside fellow dragons while bonding with Zeno and his pet squirrel Ao. Like them, he can summon shields to protect Yona.
Jae-ha (ジェハ)
Voiced by: Junichi Suwabe (Japanese); Joel McDonald (English)
Jae-ha, inheritor of the Green Dragon's leg, escaped his village's captivity to join pirates in Awa. Initially reluctant to serve Yona, her determination wins him over. His dragon leg grants superhuman kicks and leaps, though he prefers daggers in combat. A flamboyant womanizer with a teasing streak, he bonds with Hak while subtly supporting his romance with Yona. Like the other dragons, he can summon protective shields for her.
Zeno (ゼノ)
Voiced by: Hiro Shimono (Japanese); Jessie James Grelle (English)
Zeno, the Yellow Dragon, is the original immortal warrior who served King Hiryuu 2,000 years ago. Unlike the other dragons, he sought out Yona himself. His cheerful demeanor masks deep sorrow, as his regenerative immortality has tormented him for centuries. After Hiryuu's death, Zeno served as Kouka's first priest before becoming a wanderer when his agelessness drew suspicion. He wields a shield in combat and can transform into a dragon to protect Yona. Though loyal, he eventually betrays the group, believing their deaths will break the dragon curse.

=== Sky Tribe ===
King Il (イル, Iru)
King Il, Yona's father and Kouka's pacifist ruler, neglected his kingdom while obsessively preparing for Yona's prophesied reign as Hiryuu's reincarnation. Knowing Su-won would kill him (as foretold by his murdered wife Kashi), he allowed the coup, having previously killed Su-won's father Yu-hon in revenge. His weak governance and isolation of Yona created the crisis she must now resolve.
Kashi (カシ)
Yona's mother and Il's late wife, was a priestess-in-training with prophetic abilities. After foreseeing she would bear Hiryuu's reincarnation (Yona), she convinced Ju-nam to crown Il over Yu-hon. This provoked Yu-hon into thinking she had brainwashed his brother, and he later assassinated her. Though aware of her fate, Kashi sacrificed herself to protect Yona, ensuring her daughter's destiny.
Yu-hon (ユホン, Yuhon)
Yu-hon, Soo-won's father and disinherited crown prince, was a ruthless warrior who burned Hiryuu Castle's temple and assassinated the priests after they learned his wife descended from Hiryuu. His brutal tactics and anti-religious crusade shaped Soo-won's reign. Murdered by Il over Kashi's death, his killing became Soo-won's motive for the coup.
Yon-hi (ヨンヒ, Yonhi)
Yon-hi, Yu-hon's wife and Su-won's mother, was secretly descended from King Hiryuu's bloodline. Her fragile health and terminal Crimson Illness (later inherited by Su-won) left her bedridden. After Yu-hon massacred the priests who discovered her heritage, she lived in constant fear and guilt. Before dying, she gave Il her diary, pleading for reconciliation between their children. Though Il received her message, the cycle of vengeance continued.
Han Joo-doh (ハン・ジュド, Han Judo)
Han Joo-doh, the 34-year-old Sky Tribe general, serves as Su-won's strict but loyal aide. As the second most powerful figure in Kouka, he values national stability above personal ties. Though frustrated by Su-won's antics (having helped raise him), he respects Su-won's leadership and disapproved of King Il's weak policies. His rivalry with Hak stems from Il choosing Hak as Yona's bodyguard over him. While he participated in Su-won's coup, he bears no ill will toward Yona. His contentious relationship with Geun-tae involves frequent teasing about his unmarried status, though they now fight as equals.
Kye-sook (ケイシュク, Keishuku)
Kye-sook, Su-won's ruthless strategist, orchestrates his coup after being saved by Yu-hon. Initially viewing Yona as a threat, he later acknowledges her leadership and, facing Su-won's terminal illness, pragmatically considers her as his successor to ensure Kouka's stability.
Min-soo (ミンス, Minsu)
Min-soo, a former servant of King Il, reunites with Yona after surviving Su-won's coup. Once living with Su-won's family, he unwillingly became Kye-sook's informant. Now serving as Su-won's physician, he secretly aids Yona while treating the king's terminal illness.
Ogi (オギ)
Ogi, leader of Kuuto's information network, was a longtime ally of Su-won since childhood. Having helped rescue Yona during her childhood kidnapping, he now laments the rift between the former friends. After Su-won severs ties with him, Riri befriends Ogi, keeping him informed about castle affairs.

=== Wind Tribe ===
Son Mun-deok (ソン・ムンドク, Son Mundoku)
Voiced by: Katsuhiko Sasaki (Japanese); Kent Williams (English)
Son Mun-deok, the retired Wind Tribe general and Hak's adoptive grandfather, was once revered as a warrior rivaling Yu-hon in strength. Though stern in demeanor, he demonstrates deep loyalty to both his tribe and the royal family, having raised Hak and another orphan, Tae-yeon, with care.
Tae-woo (テウ, Teu)
Tae-woo, the 17-year-old successor to the Wind Tribe leadership, trains daily under Mundok to match Hak's spearmanship skills. As the youngest tribal leader, he harbors resentment toward Su-won for betraying Hak and Yona.
Ayame (アヤメ)
Ayame, a 16-year-old Wind Tribe healer and Hak's childhood friend, was nominally his fiancée due to Mundok's arrangement. Aware of Hak's feelings for Yona, she maintained her own romantic relationship. After reuniting with Yona's group, Hak clarifies the platonic nature of his bond with Ayame.

=== Water Tribe ===
An Joon-gi (アン・ジュンギ, An Jungi)
An Joon-gi, the composed Water Tribe general and Riri's father, is a master archer known for his closed-eyed precision. Initially passive during his tribe's drug crisis, he eventually supports Riri's anti-trafficking efforts after her persistence. Though frequently proposing Riri as Su-won's bride (against their wishes), he demonstrates principled leadership when confronting Kye-sook about tribal neglect.
Ayura (アユラ)
Ayura, Riri's black-haired bodyguard, is a formidable dual-wielding swordswoman devoted to the Water Tribe. After discovering Yona's true identity, she keeps the secret and later helps infiltrate Sei to rescue Riri during the kidnapping crisis.
Tetora (テトラ)
Tetora, Riri's cheerful yet deadly bodyguard, masters hand-to-hand combat behind her bubbly exterior. Severely wounded during a drug-trafficking incident, she entrusts Riri's safety to Yona. She later aids Ayura in rescuing Riri from Sei, recalling Su-won's past meeting with Joon-gi. Despite her matchmaking failures between Riri and Su-won, she remains fiercely protective of her charge.

=== Fire Tribe ===
Kan Soo-Jin (カン・スジン, Kan Sujin)
Kan Soo-jin, the ambitious Fire Tribe chief, conspired with Su-won to overthrow King Il while secretly plotting to claim Kouka's throne for himself. Believing the Fire Tribe were Hiryuu's true heirs, he later allied with Kai's Li Hazara in a failed rebellion. Though a devoted father to Kyoga and Tae-jun, his cruelty toward his people led to his own subordinates killing him after Yona denounced his unfit rule.
Kan Kyoga (カン・キョウガ)
Kan Kyoga, the Fire Tribe heir and Tae-jun's older brother, initially dismisses Yona but later respects her strength while remaining loyal to Su-won. When his father rebels, he selflessly offers his life to spare his family, but Su-won instead appoints him as the new Fire Tribe chief. Saved by Yona's group during an attack, he learns of the Four Dragons' existence while leading his troops against Kai.
Kan Tae-jun (カン・テジュン, Kan Taejun)
Kan Tae-jun evolves from selfish suitor to Yona's loyal ally after believing he killed her. Their reunion sparks his redemption - reforming the Fire Tribe's corruption. Once obsessed with power, he now risks treason for her, having truly grown from his past cruelty toward Hak and the people.
Iguni (イグニ)
Iguni, wife of Kan Su-jin and mother of Kyoga/Tae-jun, was childhood friends with Queen Kashi. Though raised as a noblewoman with traditional views (believing women should not fight), Yona challenges her perspective by insisting on battling alongside her allies. Kashi once confided in Iguni about Yona's destiny as Hiryuu's reincarnation with four dragon guardians.

=== Earth Tribe ===
Lee Geun-tae (イ・グンテ, I Gunte)
Voiced by: Masaki Aizawa (Japanese); Brandon Potter (English)
Lee Geun-tae, Earth Tribe general, is a warrior loyal to strength. Initially following Su-won, he later recognizes Yona's leadership after being wounded in battle against Kai. His pivotal choice to obey her over Su-won shows his growing respect for her connection to the tribes.

=== Kai Empire ===
Li Hazara (リ・ハザラ, Ri Hazara)
Li Hazara, a North Kai noble, conspired with Su-jin to invade Kouka but was outmaneuvered by Su-won. After losing an eye in battle and fleeing, he underestimated Su-won as another pacifist like Il—only to be met with a lethal threat that forced him to cede Kai territory.
Cha-geol (チャゴル, Chagoru)
Emperor Cha-geol, the bald, tattooed ruler of South Kai, is a ruthless tyrant who orchestrates assassinations and burns the Crimson Dragon Castle during his invasion. After failing to execute Yona (who infiltrated his camp) and nearly killing Su-won, he is fatally wounded by Hak. In his final moments, he realizes his cruelty caused his downfall. Zeno later retrieves a stolen chalice from his corpse.
Mei-nyan (メイニャン, Meinyan)
Mei-nyan is a fierce warrior, Su-won's distant relative, and a crimson illness sufferer. Once a general and forced into becoming Cha-geol's concubine, she defects to Kouka seeking the dragons' power. After framing Yona for murder and nearly being executed by Su-won, she is spared and works with Yoon to find a cure while confronting her past.

=== Xing ===
Kouren (コウレン)
Kouren, Xing's warrior princess (later queen), meets Yona while hunting and admires her skill. Still traumatized by Yu-hon's wartime brutality against Xing prisoners, she distrusts Su-won and takes the dragons hostage to stop his advance. When Yona peacefully resolves the crisis, Kouren is forced to reconsider her hatred of Kouka.
Tao (タオ)
Tao, Xing's 19-year-old princess, appears youthful but thinks strategically. Unlike her militant sister Kouren, she pragmatically advocates for Xing to become Kouka's vassal to protect her people, even sheltering Yona's group despite initial confusion.

=== Others ===
Ao (アオ) / Pukkyu (プッキュー)
Voiced by: Nozomi Yamamoto
Shin-ah's carnivorous pet squirrel, is named after the previous Blue Dragon. Despite her small size, she fiercely protects her friends, offering acorns to comfort them when they are hurt or sad.
Ik-soo (イクス, Ikkusu)
Voiced by: Junichi Kanemaru (Japanese); Jerry Jewell (English)
Ik-soo, a clumsy but devout priest, serves as Yoon's guardian and delivers the prophecy that sends Yona to find the Four Dragons. Formerly a temple keeper with Kashi, he was exiled by Yu-hon and now lives in solitude, praying for the people's wellbeing.

== Media ==
=== Manga ===
Written and illustrated by Mizuho Kusanagi, Yona of the Dawn started in Hakusensha's shōjo manga magazine Hana to Yume on August 5, 2009. The series ended after a 16-year run on December 19, 2025. An extra gaiden chapter and a supplementary fan book were published in Hana to Yume on February 20, 2026; a second and third gaiden chapters were published on April 20 and July 3, respectively. Hakusensha collected its chapters in 48 individual tankōbon volumes, released from January 19, 2010, to October 20, 2026.

The manga has been licensed for an English release in North America by Viz Media, who announced the acquisition at their New York Comic Con panel in October 2015. The first volume was released on August 2, 2016. As of July 7, 2026, 46 volumes have been released. In February 2026, Viz Media announced a 3-in-1 omnibus edition, with the first released on October 20 of the same year.

=== Anime ===
A 24-episode anime television series adaptation produced by Studio Pierrot aired between October 7, 2014, and March 24, 2015, on AT-X. Funimation has licensed the anime series for streaming and home video rights in North America. Beginning on March 17, 2015, Funimation streamed their dubbed version of the anime, starting with episode 13 while the first half of the season released in June 2016. The first opening theme is an instrumental song by Kunihiko Ryo, called "Akatsuki no Yona" (暁のヨナ; lit. 'Yona of the Dawn'). The first ending theme is Yoru (夜; lit. 'Night') by Vistlip. The second opening theme is "Akatsuki no Hana", by Cyntia. The second ending theme is "Akatsuki", by Akiko Shikata. Three original video animations were bundled with the manga's 19th, 21st and 22nd limited edition volumes, respectively. The first OVA was released on September 18, 2015, the second OVA was released on August 19, 2016, and the third OVA was released on December 20, 2016.

A sequel to the anime series was announced in Hana to Yume on December 19, 2025. It will be produced by Pierrot Films.

== Reception ==
By April 2026, the manga had over 16 million copies in circulation. The manga placed first in Rakuten Kobo's second E-book Award in the "Long Seller Comic" category in 2024.

== See also ==
- The Heroic Legend of Arslan, a novel series with a similar premise
