= List of Please Save My Earth volumes =

Cover of the first volume of the Please Save My Earth wide-ban edition, as published by Hakusensha on May 28, 2004, in Japan

The manga series Please Save My Earth is written and illustrated by Saki Hiwatari. The main characters of the story are high school student Alice Sakaguchi, her seven-year-old neighbor Rin Kobayashi and five other students, all of whom have recurring collective dreams about a group of alien scientists stationed on the Moon to observe and collect data about the Earth.

The series was published by Hakusensha in the Hana to Yume magazine, from December 20, 1986, to May 20, 1994, and was collected in 21 tankōbon volumes. It was reissued in a 12 bunkoban volume edition in 1998; and again in an A5 format edition (wide-ban) of 10 volumes in 2004.

The manga was licensed in English in North America by Viz Media, which released all tankōbon volumes from October 2003 to March 2007. It was additionally translated into Italian by Planet Manga; into French by Tonkam; and German by Carlsen Verlag.

== Volume list ==
| No. | Original release date | Original ISBN | North America release date | North America ISBN |
|---|---|---|---|---|
| 1 | June 1987 | 4-592-11485-X | October 29, 2003 | 1-591-16059-6 |
Alice Sakaguchi moves to Tokyo from Hokkaidō. She lives next door to the most annoying seven-year-old she has ever met, Rin Kobayashi, and is forced to babysit him. One day, while on the way home from the zoo, Alice and Rin run into Alice's classmates Jinpachi and Issei and they talk about a scene Alice had "accidentally" spied upon the previous day. Jinpachi and Issei explain that the discussion Alice overheard was about a series of synchronized dreams about the Moon that they have been sharing since middle school and which have now become pornographic in nature. Later that night, after they are home, Alice and Rin get into a juvenile argument over Jinpachi and Alice slaps him. This causes him to lose his balance on the balcony railing and fall off of the 15th story apartment balcony. Miraculously, he survives, although he is in a coma. While in his coma, Rin dreams that he is an engineer named Shion who is stationed on a base on the Moon with six others, all studying the Earth. Eventually, he awakens from his coma and proceeds to have his mother request an engagement to Alice on his behalf. When Alice hears of this, she faints and has her first Moon dream as the beautiful biologist Mokuren. Meanwhile, a biker gang leader, Takashi, is sent a suspicious message by "S", who turns out to be a very adult-sounding and adult-acting Rin, exhibiting ESP powers. Rin demands that Takashi give him Tokyo Tower.
| 2 | October 1987 | 4-592-11486-8 | December 31, 2003 | 1-59116-116-9 |
Alice tells Jinpachi and Issei about her moon dream as Mokuren. They excitedly confirm that the pictures Alice drew of Shion and Mokuren are how the two appear in their own dreams. They decide to seek out the other reincarnations and put an ad in Boo magazine. Meanwhile, Kazuto Tamura arrives at the home of Mr. Raozo Matsudaira to take care of his son, Takashi, who seems to have gone insane with fear. As Tamura investigates Takashi's problem, he gets a letter from the same "S" who scared Takashi so badly. Later, Jinpachi and Issei are the target of an unauthorized hit by Takashi's bakuto biker gang at their school. During the fight, Jinpachi displays ESP powers of his own. Another moon dreamer, Haruhiko Kazama, who was once saved by Tamura, runs into Alice and Rin at a department store. Later, Issei receives a letter from two other Moon dreamers who saw their ad and all three of them go to the station to meet the newcomers. Daisuke Dobashi is Hiiragi, and Sakura Kokusho is Shusuran. The others discover that Daisuke and Sakura seem to be much further along in their Moon dreaming when they mention the destruction of scientists' Homeworld and their deaths by a virus outbreak. Later that night, Tamura goes to meet S in Takashi's stead in order to find out what he wants.
| 3 | March 1988 | 4-592-11487-6 | March 4, 2004 | 1-59116-142-8 |
It turns out that S was meeting with Takashi to give him the blueprints of the Tokyo Tower renovation plans. Rin nearly beats Tamura to death for interfering. Due to his ESP and his strong connection to Tamura, Haruhiko is able to sense this and teleports to Tamura's rescue in time to catch a glimpse of Rin as he flies away. A few days later, Alice goes to another meeting with the reincarnates and is forced to take Rin with her, whereby, to the surprise of everyone, he announces that he is the reincarnation of Shukaido. To explain the age difference, he mentions that his first reincarnation died in a car accident. After the meeting, Alice feels guilty that she triggered Rin's Moon dreams, which largely seem to be nightmares, so she decides to quit meeting with the other reincarnates and join the choir. After seeing him in the hospital ward visiting Tamura, Rin decides to have a chat with Haruhiko about what Haruhiko's previous incarnation, Shukaido, did to Rin's true reincarnation, Shion, on the Moon base. Here, Rin explains to Haruhiko his plan to gather the Moon base passwords and "save the Earth". A few days later, Tamura, now out of the hospital, receives a call from Haruhiko's worried mother, asking him to come by to visit her son. When Tamura walks into Haruhiko's room, he is witness to Haruhiko's projected moon dream. Haruhiko, terrified, teleports out of the room and to the river in order to drown himself. Issei and Sakura happen to be walking by at the same time, discussing Issei's struggle with Enju's feelings toward Gyokuran, and witness this. Just after Haruhiko jumps, Issei scrambles and dives in after him.
| 4 | June 1988 | 4-592-11488-4 | May 12, 2004 | 1-59116-267-X |
After Haruhiko dives into the river, he dreams of the Moon and remembers his password. He wakes up in the hospital with Tamura looking over him. Tamura thanks Issei and Sakura, and they head out squeeing over Tamura's coolness. Again, Rin meets with Haruhiko and this time tells him that he, Rin, is going to arrange a meeting with the other reincarnates, but that Haruhiko is to tell them that he is the reincarnation of Shion so that he can get close to Alice and get her password. Rin gives Haruhiko a script that he is to follow to the letter. Jinpachi later finds out about Alice's engagement to Rin through her brother, Hajime. Jinpachi is distraught, and argues with Alice over it, then later discusses it with Issei on the roof of the school, whereby Issei kisses him and Jinpachi freaks out, inadvertently hurting Issei. Most of the reincarnates are missing from the meeting later on and begin to question the purpose of even having the meetings to begin with. That is when Daisuke gets notification that he has "found" Shion, indicating that their meetings were meant to continue. The boys later tell Alice that Shion has been found, but she declines attendance, claiming yet again that she is not Mokuren. Meanwhile, Tamura gets in touch with an old friend of his, whose brother has ESP. Tamura meets with Hokuto and his ESPer brother, Mikuro, and discusses both S's powers and the strange things he has experienced with Haruhiko. He decides to move Takashi and himself to Kyoto in order to protect Takashi and to have easy-access to Mikuro. Rin meets with Haruhiko one last time before the meeting, where Haruhiko divulges Shukaido's password to Rin. After he returns home, Haruhiko discovers that Tamura has left for Kyoto and freaks out.
| 5 | November 1988 | 4-592-11489-2 | July 14, 2004 | 1-59116-268-8 |
At the news of Tamura moving to Kyoto, Haruhiko freaks out and teleports directly to Tamura's apartment, whereby Tamura calmly explains that he is going there to learn more about ESP powers and will return when he is prepared to defeat Rin. Rin sees Tamura off at the train the next day, while Haruhiko sits down to write Tamura a letter detailing the complete story of Shukaido, Shion, and the moon base scientists. Later, Haruhiko shows up for the meeting with the other reincarnations and has to improvise his story due to the unforeseen issue of Issei and Sakura having been there when he tried to kill himself. Rin is displeased, and tortures him later for it, while threatening Tamura's life if Haruhiko tells him anything else about the moon dreams. Tamura, in Kyoto, stops by to see Mikuro at his family's flowershop, whereby Mikuro's mother tells him to go away and never come back in no uncertain terms. Haruhiko is scared for Tamura's life because of the letter he wrote him, and so he teleports to Kyoto and tells Takashi to promise to tear up the letter when it arrives. As Takashi is about to tear the letter up, however, Tamura intercepts it and reads it anyway. Haruhiko later meets with Alice as Shion in what appears to be a date, and they discuss whether or not Alice is Mokuren. The situation becomes awkward after Rin leaves and Haruhiko demands to know how Alice feels about her engagement to Rin. At the same time, Issei and Sakura decide to go visit Tamura and ask about Haruhiko's suicide attempt. They are unable to contact Tamura, but on their way out, they spy Haruhiko and Alice together on their secret date.
| 6 | March 1989 | 4-592-11490-6 | September 21, 2004 | 1-59116-269-6 |
After seeing Alice and Haruhiko together, Issei calls Jinpachi, who in turn tells Issei about Alice and Rin's engagement. Later, Rin decides to break off his engagement with Alice. Before Rin shows up, Jinpachi tells everyone at the next meeting about Alice and Rin's engagement and also about Alice and Haruhiko's secret meeting. Rin appears and, having overheard, tells the others he ended the engagement because Haruhiko told him to. With all this information, the others really start to distrust Haruhiko and discuss the passwords. Daisuke then steps in and tells everyone to remain silent about their passwords, explaining that together they could activate some dangerous functionality on the moon base. Meanwhile, in Kyoto, Tamura receives a call from Hokuto saying that his mother wants to meet with him. He goes to meet her and she explains she is very protective of Mikuro due to how his ESP powers negatively affected his childhood. However, Haruhiko's letter, which she had read, made it clear she needed to discuss things with Tamura. She explains to him that he must not only strive to help Haruhiko, but that he needs to save Rin as well. Later, at the reincarnates meeting, they decide to draw up a timeline and by doing so, they start recalling details, such as Mokuren's singing causing the plants to grow, and the video they took of her singing on Thanksgiving one year. On the way home, Sakura recalls a sad moment from Shusuran's perspective about her and Enju. Alice later agrees to attend the next reincarnates meeting. Finally, while Haruhiko is at the aquarium, Mikuro appears and slips him a message telling him that teleportation hurts his heart, and then disappears before he can react.
| 7 | July 1989 | 4-592-11506-6 | November 24, 2004 | 1-59116-270-X |
Haruhiko believes the letter he received is from an associate of S's, and so calls up Takashi to verify he tore up his letter to Tamura. Takashi tells Haruhiko that he did tear up the letter, as Tamura secretly instructed him to tell Haruhiko. At the meeting, Alice looks at the timeline and contests that Shukaido was the last to die due to various things Rin has said about his dreams. The others have remarked previously that Haruhiko's personality does not match up well with Shion's, from the little they have seen of him, but still do not think much of it and leave the timeline the way it is. Later, Haruhiko meets with Rin and chastises him about having his associates, like "M", spy on him, showing Rin the letter. Rin's obvious lack of recognition instantly clues Haruhiko in that M was working for Tamura. As soon as he leaves, he frantically calls Tamura, telling him to get out of there and hide Takashi and M, and that he is heading to Kyoto. Rin, meanwhile, sets up a trap for Takashi, in order to draw M out and finish off Tamura for good. As planned, Tamura intercepts the fake "love letter" and goes to the meeting location in Takashi's place yet again, this time with Mikuro in tow. A battle of wits between Rin and Tamura, as well as a psychic battle between Rin and Mikuro begins. Just as Rin deals the final blow to the two of them, someone teleports in-between them, taking the brunt of the blast.
| 8 | December 1989 | 4-592-11507-4 | January 11, 2005 | 1-59116-271-8 |
The someone who appeared in-between Tamura, Mikuro and Rin was Haruhiko, having teleported three times at significant danger to himself in order to save them. After deflecting the blast, Rin blasts him again. As Rin is about to finish the rest of them off again, Mikuro simultaneously counters his attack, causing a huge explosion. Rin teleports, further damaging himself, and then wakes up in the hospital, scared to death. The doctors say he has been hit by a car even though his wounds are not consistent with such an event. Rin lapses into dreams of Shion's childhood. Shion was born on a war-torn moon called Tess. He was found by the alliance after killing a group of soldiers with his psychic powers, who then transported him to Shia, the largest of the outlying planets of the Homeworld. There he lived with the priestesses of Sarjalim, the Lim Lians, learning about the history of their race, as well as the Sarjalim faith. This is when he meets Lian Karsh, the only person he would have an ounce of respect for in his entire life. After not too long, a foster father was found for him, named La Zlo. Shion moves in with La Zlo and his pet alien cat, Kyaa. Through La Zlo's patience and understanding, Shion begins to learn what it is to have a real family, until La Zlo and Kyaa die after only 78 days of fostering. He is taken back to the Lim Lians and ends up meeting Gyokuran in grade school. Later, in high school, Gyokuran introduces Shion to Shukaido. Shion remains bitter from the day he first meets Gyokuran about Gyokuran's perfect life and how he, Shion, could never have anything like that or fit in with these perfect people.
| 9 | May 1990 | 4-592-11508-2 | March 15, 2005 | 1-59116-272-6 |
In high school, Shion and Gyokuran have a large fight over a girl named Coco, not because Shion likes her, but because Shion uses her to hurt Gyokuran. Gyokuran has now become a rival of Shion's, and he sinks to the level of using other people in order to hurt Gyokuran. They have a fight and part on bad terms. After graduation, Shion goes on to become an acclaimed engineer, one of the best. Despite this, he cannot seem to find someone who will love him for him, no matter what. Eventually, due to his bad behavior, he is forced to join the ZKK-101 team and go to a remote location to study the planet known colloquially as Earth. Because it is an undesirable job, he gets a large sum of money for it. Using that money, he buys a giant alien cat and names him Kyaa Junior. Before leaving for the ZKK-101 mission, he leaves Kyaa Junior with Liam Karsh. When he meets the rest of his team, he becomes incredibly bitter about Mokuren's perceived perfection as a Kiches Sarjalian. At the Moon base, he finds that he enjoys tormenting her as often as the opportunity presents itself. He also despises the way all the other men fawn over her. After a while, he is informed via message that Lian Karsh has died and that Kyaa Junior is ill and needs medical attention. Since the Lians cannot afford the vet bill, Shion authorizes the sale of Kyaa Junior to the vet for a loss. He takes out his frustration on Mokuren, who then heads off to secretly sing to the plants, which causes the Moon base to be overgrown with weeds overnight, breaking all of Shion's computers.
| 10 | October 1990 | 4-592-12190-2 | May 10, 2005 | 1-59116-273-4 |
The scientists all work on cleaning up the weeds, and Shion is furious with Mokuren for messing up his computers. Gyokuran tells Shion that he is in love with Mokuren, while Shion dismisses his comment saying it does not matter since she is Kiches and cannot get married. Fast forward, the scientists are cleaning up weeds for the umpteenth time and Shusuran is incredibly annoyed. She argues with Enju about Mokuren being in love with Gyokuran. Later, the scientists receive desperate messages from Shia saying that the war has taken a turn for the worse. Finally, the signal from Shia is completely lost, indicating total annihilation. Everyone goes into shock for a few days, then Shion decides it would be a good idea to go down to Earth to live out their lives. Mokuren initially agrees, but Gyokuran and Hiiragi disagree. Hiiragi, as team leader, puts his foot down. Shion, however, continues to harass Shusuran for her password and ends up getting thrown in the anti-psychic brig for being a dissenter. While bringing him his lunch, Shion eventually says to Mokuren: "I love you, give up your Kiches (virginity) and I will do whatever it takes to make up with Gyokuran." She accepts, but when she enters Shion's cell for the deed, she changes her mind at the last minute and resists. She is later found crying by the others and Gyokuran goes insane with rage. Shion crowns himself the winner in their rivalry as he got to Mokuren first with the bonus of blaspheming against Sarjilam at the same time. When Gyokuran demands permanent exile for Shion, Mokuren, after being "ill" for a week, steps up and demands Gyokuran let Shion out because the two of them are engaged.
| 11 | February 1991 | 4-592-12191-0 | July 12, 2005 | 1-59116-846-5 |
After being released from the brig, Shion moves into Mokuren's quarters. He realizes, after a time, that Mokuren really was the true person for him, as she has forgiven him despite all he has done, that she chose him over all else. She did not lose her Kiche because she is truly divine, and nothing he could possibly do could defile her. Rin then wakes up in his hospital room and silently vows to destroy Tamura. Haruhiko has been taken to Mikuro's mother's house in Kyoto for recovery. Jinpachi shows up at Rin's hospital room and gives him Gyokuran's password. Jinpachi talks to Issei about giving his password to Shukaido (Rin) afterwards, and Issei sleeps on the thought. The next day, he tells Jinpachi during a heated argument that he is not going to give his password to anyone but Shion (Haruhiko). Issei meets up with Sakura afterwards and frets more over his struggle with Enju's emotions and what to do about the situation. Sakura tells him to let Enju and her love for Gyokuran go. Sakura goes to Issei's school the next day and slugs Jinpachi for being insensitive toward Issei, while giving him Issei's, Enju's, password to give to Shukaido (Rin). Later, Alice is told by Rin's mother that he is going to be taking piano lessons with Ayako Okamura, Tamura's "girlfriend". Alice talks to Rin about it, and gets incredibly jealous over what she perceives to be Rin's romantic interest in Ayako.
| 12 | June 1991 | 4-592-12192-9 | September 6, 2005 | 1-59116-987-9 |
Jinpachi and Issei discuss with Alice that the Bakuto biker gang hit was orchestrated by Shion (Haruhiko) and that Shion has also been manipulating Shukaido (Rin). Jinpachi tells Alice he loves her again and asks her to consider it seriously after all of this drama with the moon dreaming is finally over. Rin now has four of the passwords to the Moon base. Tamura and Mikuro come to visit Rin in the hospital trying to reason with him, but also showing him that they know who he is. They discover inadvertently that Rin was targeting Ayako in order to get to Tamura. They pull Ayako aside when she comes to visit Rin to discuss his piano lesson and they eventually convince her to lie low for a while. Rin's mother is severely stressed out by this visit and mentally checks out for a while. Due to the news of Shion (Haruhiko) targeting them, Alice decides that she will recall all of Mokuren's Moon dreams for Rin, and informs him of this. Rin argues with her and yells at her to get out of his hospital room. Jinpachi kisses Alice and reaffirms that he believes Mokuren truly loved Gyokuran instead. Rin seems to be taking a while to heal due to his use of ESP powers at the battle. He faints and recalls a Moon dream of Shion, alone on the Moon base, building something Rin believes to be terrible and powerful, but that he cannot recall what it is. Rin is scared to death of it.
| 13 | November 1991 | 4-592-12193-7 | November 8, 2005 | 1-4215-0127-9 |
Alice prepares for their school trip to Kyoto and Mikuro visits Rin again in the hospital. Mikuro tries to connect with Rin all the while attempting to defuse Shion's anger. Rin's mother barges in on them and screams at Rin that he is not her son. This devastates Rin and he frantically teleports away, damaging his body further. The other reincarnates continue to discuss the situation. Daisuke is angered that everyone is divulging their passwords after he explicitly said not to. Alice decides to tell Rin's mother the entire story. A bum named Boone finds Rin dying in some bushes and asks Dr. Mori to patch him up. Jinpachi and Issei speak with Alice about sealing Rin's memories of the moon away. Alice yet again tells the two that she is sure that Rin's reincarnation was the last one left on the Moon. Whether it was Shion or Shukaido, it does not matter. Later, Alice talks to Rin's mother, who accepts Alice's ludicrous story since there is no mundane explanation for anything that has happened. Rin finally awakens at Dr. Mori's house and freaks out, levitating the bed and nearby objects in front of Boone and Dr Mori. Boone tells Rin they will not call the cops on him and that he can stay at Dr Mori's house until he is ready to leave. Alice realizes that she is the only one who can resolve the disconnect between Rin being Shukaido and Rin being the last one on the moon base with her memories of Mokuren. Alice, Jinpachi and Issei head off on their school trip to Kyoto with the intention of meeting up with Tamura to clear up some of this confusion with Haruhiko and Shion.
| 14 | April 1992 | 4-592-12194-5 | January 10, 2006 | 1-4215-0193-7 |
Rin researches a former Yakuza rival of Tamura's from when Tamura used to work for the Yakuza, a man named Masaki Majima. Jinpachi, Issei and Alice arrive in Kyoto, and Alice falls ill just before their meeting with Tamura. Rin practices precision telekinesis while another kid spies on him. Rin ends up using the other kid to form a gang of grade schoolers. Jinpachi, Issei and Alice, feeling better now, go to meet with Tamura and Haruhiko. There, Haruhiko comes clean, explaining that he is Shukaido, not Shion, and that Rin has been forcing him to pretend otherwise. He explains the horrible thing that Shukaido did to Shion on the Moon base, giving Shion the only vaccine to the virus, forcing him to live another nine years alone. This is the real reason for Rin's age difference. Tamura then explains Rin's actions concerning the Tokyo Tower renovation as well. Afterwards, Jinpachi and Issei discuss the meeting with Haruhiko, eventually deciding that he is very brave to have come clean about his past reincarnation's terrible action. The next day, Alice begins hallucinating about the scientists at the temple they visit in Kyoto, causing her to faint and the cherry trees to bloom out of season. Jinpachi and Issei notice the Kiches mark appear on Alice's forehead and are finally convinced that Alice is the reincarnation of Mokuren, as she begins to dream of her past.
| 15 | September 1992 | 4-592-12195-3 | March 14, 2006 | 1-4215-0326-3 |
Majima shows up at Dr. Mori's because one of his men has been shot. He comments about Rin, a kid, being at an illegitimate doctor's office. Alice begins dreaming of Mokuren's past. Mokuren's parents were both Kiches Sarjalians who lived and met in paradise. They decided to give up their Kiches and have Mokuren. When Mokuren was born with the Kiches mark on her forehead her parents were heartbroken. When she was three years old, Mokuren's grandparents came and stole her away from her parents and turned her over to the state. Later, her father snuck in to retrieve her and they ran from the government for a while, until her father's death. Her mother died soon after. Mokuren is then sent back to "Paradise", the state-controlled facility for the national treasures and religious icons known as Kiches Sarjalians. There she lives naked and removed from society, with no contact with other humans other than the Lim Lians and other Kiches. It is here that Mokuren first falls in love with KK. Soon after, Mokuren meets the Kiches Elder and receives her first Kiches prophecy. Frustrated, Mokuren decides to sneak out one day and meets a human boy named Sev Oru. Mokuren decides to use him to get rid of her Kiches, but Sev Oru's father is against this, and Sev Oru refuses. Some time later, Sev Oru frantically demands that Mokuren save his father, a circus performer, who was severely injured on the job. It is commonly known that Kiches have this power, but not that it only comes when they are older and more experienced than Mokuren. When she is unable to help him, Sev Oru's father dies and he turns his back on her. Mokuren is heartbroken.
| 16 | December 1992 | 4-592-12196-1 | May 9, 2006 | 1-4215-0549-5 |
At the age of 20, Mokuren is finally allowed out into society to go to graduate school. She cannot seem to make any female friends, although the boys love her. She performs regularly as the prima Kiches Sarjalian soloist. Mokuren hears one day that a new team is being formed to go to the base on ZKK-101. Mokuren vows to be part of that team, and petitions the Kiches Elder. The Elder approves her request and gives a second prophecy, that she will be reborn somehow on this mission. Mokuren meets with the rest of the team hoping to start over with these people and actually make friends. She also hopes some of them will be cute. Mokuren does one final performance as a Kiches before leaving with the team to ZKK-101, with the other scientists (minus Shion) in attendance. On the Moon base, Mokuren gets along fairly well with the others, although Shion seems to take pleasure in tormenting her. She accidentally commits a few faux pas, to the embarrassment of Shion and Gyokuran. Despite this, Mokuren seems drawn to Shion and tries to reach out to him. When she shows him visions of his childhood, however, he becomes angry and accuses her of giving him false visions. He later pretends to apologise for being so mean to her and proceeds to mock her with a vision of a pig's butt.
| 17 | April 1993 | 4-592-12197-X | July 11, 2006 | 1-4215-0550-9 |
After Shion mistreats her, Mokuren goes into the greenhouse to sing to the plants to console herself. The next day, the entire Moon base is overgrown with weeds, which have also caused Shion's computers to break. Shion becomes even more furious with her, while everyone works at removing the weeds. Again and again, Shion is mean to Mokuren and she makes the plants grow, forcing the others to clean up the mess. Mokuren gets drunk one night and Gyokuran tries to convince her that Shion actually likes her despite his behavior. Later, she gets notification that the Kiches Elder has died. In her death message to Mokuren, the Elder reminds her of the second prophecy, that Mokuren will experience a rebirth. Mokuren frets that she should return to Shia and Gyokuran kisses her and asks her to marry him. Mokuren hesitates, thinking of Shion instead, and Gyokuran retracts his offer, knowing that Kiches cannot get married. Finally, Alice dreams of the Homeworld being destroyed. Everyone is beside themselves. They look to Mokuren as a representative of a higher authority to do something about it, but she cannot, and feels trapped. Shion eventually suggests they all go down to Earth. Mokuren initially agrees, but the others do not and, after pressing Shusuran too far, Shion gets thrown in the brig for dissenting. Mokuren tries to reason with him several times while bringing him dinner, and Gyokuran warns her to stay away from him. Alice awakens and hesitates about dreaming more; she knows the event of her rape is looming before her and she does not want to relive it. Issei, having seen a projection of Shion crying from Alice's dream, comments to Jinpachi about how Shion always seemed to be especially nice to Enju, to care about her.
| 18 | September 1993 | 4-592-12198-8 | September 12, 2006 | 1-4215-0551-7 |
Shion makes Mokuren an offer: "I love you, give up your Kiches (virginity) and I will do whatever it takes to make peace with Gyokuran." As Mokuren ponders her answer, she becomes excited by the prospect that Shion loves her. Alice then wakes up in a panic. The police come looking for Mikuro and Hokuto calls up Tamura, telling him he cannot use Mikuro anymore. Rin calls Daisuke, pretending to be Jinpachi and trying to use the truth, that Rin is Shion, to get Hiiragi's password. When this does not work, Rin extorts the password out of him by drowning Daisuke's brother. Later, Jinpachi calls Daisuke to tell him about their meeting with Haruhiko, but too late, Daisuke has given up Hiiragi's password. Now, only Mokuren's is safe. The gang frets about how to protect Alice from Rin. They meet with Tamura at a restaurant and decide to take Alice hotel hopping. Meanwhile, Alice freaks out over her dreams and runs out of the apartment. As Tamura and Haruhiko leave the restaurant, Majima appears and shoots Tamura. Majima tells Tamura about the true circumstances surrounding his brother's death as he looms over him mockingly. Haruhiko comes up and screams at Majima, as Mikuro appears behind Majima and sends him into the air to "cool off". Majima is shocked to see that Tamura has such powerful people working for him. They leave; Haruhiko goes to the store while Mikuro and Tamura talk and runs into Alice. He talks with her about the Moon dreams and encourages her to finish her moon dreaming so that she can hopefully defuse Rin by telling him Mokuren does not love him. But Alice reveals that she simply does not want to re-experience Mokuren's agony over the fact that Shion does not love her.
| 19 | December 1993 | 4-592-12199-6 | November 14, 2006 | 1-4215-0552-5 |
Haruhiko and the others get Alice to the first hotel. She falls asleep, dreaming of the moon. Mokuren is ill after the rape, and Shusuran and Enju are with her, trying to console her. Mokuren remembers crying over the fact that Shion does not love her. Then she hears about Shion's pending permanent exile and goes to talk to Gyokuran. She declares quite forcefully that she is in love with Shion, and that they are to release him at once. Gyokuran eventually caves, and Shion moves in with Mokuren. As they sit down to talk, the emotional wall around him crumbles. Majima looks up psychic powers in a book store when he is approached by some children who ask him about an alliance with their "hero" (Rin) in order to finish Tamura off. Majima calls up Tamura to come meet with him, while Haruhiko and Mikuro go to the store. They see Rin. Mikuro chases him and finds out that he has just been had, as Tamura gets picked up by the police instead of meeting Majima. Haruhiko teleports back to the hotel room to tell the rest. Hajime and Ayako take him to the ER while Alice waits. Now alone, Alice is kidnapped by Majima. Alice dreams of Mokuren trying to kill Shion, but giving up. While cleaning up the weeds, Mokuren tells Shion of the Kiches' most closely guarded secret, the black hymn, and then, to his surprise, admits that she has the disease. She spends some good time with Shion, followed by a seizure after he leaves, where Mokuren becomes frantic that she is about to die and pleads with KK to grant her "one miracle", like her mother had told her about when she was young.
| 20 | April 1994 | 4-592-12200-3 | January 9, 2007 | 1-4215-0553-3 |
Mokuren finds that her spirit is falling to Earth. She sees Rin falling from the balcony and reaches out to save him. After saving him, she silently tells her reincarnation, Alice, to live her life the way she wants to. Mokuren returns to Shion one last time, telling him to not kill himself before dying in his arms. Majima drops the unconscious Alice off at Dr. Mori's house and finally meets Rin. Alice wakes up and talks to Rin. They argue about who loved or did not love who, while Rin alternately switches to demanding Mokuren's password. Rin tells Alice about the device Shion built and about his plan to use her song to dominate the world. Mikuro goes to Jinpachi and Issei to tell them all that has happened. Daisuke and Sakura show up to tell the others that Ayako has bailed Tamura out of jail. Rin and Alice argue even more about whether or not Shion and Mokuren loved each other. Rin eventually drags the discussion back to the passwords, and Alice watches him argue with himself over what he is going to do with the passwords once he has them all. Alice realizes that Rin wants to destroy the base while Shion wants to dominate the world, and they constantly struggle over it. After Tamura reappears, Mikuro goes to see Majima and gets him to tell him where he took Alice. Rin teleports away and Dr. Mori and Boone find Alice is sealed in their house behind a psychic barrier.
| 21 | August 1994 | 4-592-12215-1 | March 13, 2007 | 1-4215-0837-0 |
Alice uses Mokuren's power to break the forcefield Rin placed around Dr. Mori's house. Rin returns, surprised at this, and needing to get Alice out of there since Majima gave up the location. Alice tells Rin they should go to Tokyo Tower and destroy the moon base, giving him Mokuren's password: Shion's own name. Jinpachi appears, yelling at Rin, as the others come in behind him. Rin is overwhelmed and disappears after an explosion occurs. Alice, Mikuro, Jinpachi, Tamura and Haruhiko all teleport to Tokyo Tower. The others take a taxi. Rin fights Mikuro, while the others argue with him about what he is doing. He begins inputting the passwords through the device he had built during the renovation. As he enters the final password, Alice screams at Rin to blow the base up. Rin enters system code 999, self destruct, but the computer returns with the message "unable to comply". Confused and desperate, Rin tries again, with the same response. He remembers now the device that Shion built while alone on the Moon base: a 3D holographic image of Mokuren singing, made from a video taken by Shusuran. The device continued playing on after Shion died and Mokuren's eternal resonating song caused the base to be overgrown with weeds and the computer to malfunction for the final time. Rin faints at this realization and falls from the top of Tokyo Tower. Gyokuran jumps to his rescue, teleporting him to safety, as Rin dreams of leaving the Moon base, and Shion, behind. Yet again, Rin is in the hospital in a coma. When he wakes up, Alice confesses her absolute love for him, and Jinpachi is disappointed. The story concludes four years later, with Alice exchanging letters with Haruhiko, discussing what everyone is doing now.
