= Sakaguchi =

Sakaguchi (坂口, 阪口) is a Japanese surname. Notable people with the surname include:

- Alicja Sakaguchi (born 1954), Polish linguist
- Ango Sakaguchi (1906–1955), Japanese novelist and essayist
- Anri Sakaguchi (born 1991), Japanese entertainer
- Chikara Sakaguchi (born 1934), Japanese politician
- Daisuke Sakaguchi (born 1973), Japanese voice actor
- Donald Sakaguchi, neuroscientist
- Fumiko Sakaguchi (坂口 文子; born 1934), Japanese swimmer
- Hironobu Sakaguchi (born 1962), Japanese game designer, game director and game producer
- Hiroyuki Sakaguchi (born 1965), Japanese baseball player
- Kenji Sakaguchi (actor) (born 1975), Japanese actor
- Kentaro Sakaguchi (坂口 健太郎; born 1991), Japanese model and actor
- Kinichiro Sakaguchi (1897–1994), Japanese agricultural chemist and microbiologist
- Kōichi Sakaguchi, Japanese voice actor
- Maki Sakaguchi (born 1989), Japanese field hockey player
- Mizuho Sakaguchi (阪口 夢穂; born 1987), Japanese women's footballer
- Moeno Sakaguchi (阪口 萌乃; born 1992), Japanese women's footballer
- Natsu Sakaguchi (坂口 夏月; born 1995), Japanese racing driver
- Ryohei Sakaguchi (阪口 良平; born 1975), Japanese racing driver
- Satoru Sakaguchi (阪口 悟; born 1978), Japanese shogi player
- Seiji Sakaguchi (坂口 征二; born 1942), retired Japanese professional wrestler
- Sena Sakaguchi (born 1999), Japanese racing driver
- Shimon Sakaguchi (坂口 志文; born 1951), Japanese immunologist
- Shūhei Sakaguchi (born 1977), Japanese voice actor
- Tak Sakaguchi (born 1975), Japanese actor, director, fight choreographer and stuntman
- Yoshisada Sakaguchi (1939–2020), Japanese actor and voice actor
- Yukio Sakaguchi (坂口 征夫; born 1973), Japanese mixed martial artist and professional wrestler
- Tsubasa Sakaguchi (阪口 翼, born 19??), Japanese game designer and director for Nintendo

== Fictional characters ==
- Alice Sakaguchi, the main character from Please Save My Earth

== See also ==
- 10823 Sakaguchi, a main-belt asteroid
- Sakaguchi test, a chemical test
