= List of Please Save My Earth characters =

This is a list of characters from the manga series Please Save My Earth.

== Main characters ==
The seven scientists, the seven reincarnations, and their relationships to each other

=== Alice Sakaguchi ===
Alice Sakaguchi (坂口亜梨子, Sakaguchi Arisu) is a shy, quiet high-schooler who recently moved to Tokyo from a town in Hokkaidō, which she misses for its peace and lack of pollution. Alice's first appearance shows her being teased and mocked by the boy next door, Rin Kobayashi. She retains her previous life Mokuren's ability to talk to plants, and make plants grow by singing to them. Despite Rin's encouragement, Alice is having a hard time remembering her life as a scientist. This is because she is afraid of losing her current self in Mokuren's memories and also because she feels that she, as Alice, could never live up to the others' expectations of Mokuren. This refusal on Alice's part to continue her moon dreaming comes to a head when she decides to stop joining the other reincarnates for their after school meetings, and instead joins the school choir. At this point even the other reincarnates begin doubting that she is the reincarnation of Mokuren, especially given that she has only had one moon dream. All of them, that is, except for Jinpachi and Rin. Due to an argument that caused her to smack Rin and push him off a balcony, she is blackmailed into securing an engagement to Rin. While she cares for him as a friend and neighbor at first, she later develops genuine feelings for him and ignores the nine-year age difference between them.

Her previous life, Mokuren, was the team's biologist. She was a gorgeous woman with long blonde hair. All of the male scientists except Shion fell in love with her after attending her final performance as a Kiches Sarjalian on Shia, before leaving for ZKK-101. She has been obsessed with Earth since her childhood and longed to live among the humans she observed. Mokuren was a special and extremely rare subset of Sarches, psychics, known as a "Kiches Sarjalian". Kiches are blessed with the gifts of growth by the goddess Sarjalim. The word "Kiche" is used to refer to the mark on her forehead, which consists of four red dots. A Kiches' powers manifest themselves as plant empathy and plant growth through song at a young age, and eventually even human empathy and healing at a very old age and high level of experience. Mokuren's plant growth abilities are displayed on the moon base several times when Shion torments Mokuren, sending her off to console herself by singing to the plants in the greenhouse. This singing then causes the entire moon base to sprout weeds over night, ironically destroying Shion's computers in the process, which he then must fix, making him even more frustrated with Mokuren.

Kiches are known to lose their powers once they lose their virginity. In addition to hurting Gyokuran, Shion decided to blaspheme against the Sarjalim faith by having sex with Mokuren. While Shion and Mokuren had struck a bargain where the intention of sex could not have been misinterpreted, Mokuren resisted at the last minute when she found out that Shion did not sleep with her out of love but with the intention of getting back at Gyokuran. Shion pressed the issue forward anyway, effectively raping her. Shusuran stumbled upon the two of them afterwards and after raising the alarm and everyone knowing what happened, Gyokuran became enraged, positive that Shion had taken advantage of her, especially given that she became ill directly afterwards. In an effort to pacify Gyokuran and achieve the goal she had sought in the first place by making that original agreement with Shion, Mokuren told Gyokuran quite directly that she and Shion had become engaged and that Gyokuran was to release him from the brig at once. At Mokuren's behest, Gyokuran caved and let Shion out, allowing the two to move into Mokuren's quarters together. The greatest contention in this event was Mokuren's point of view of the situation, why she resisted at the last minute when she had already agreed to have sex with Shion. Everyone else assumed the act of sex, the rape itself, was responsible for Mokuren's tears and distress after the fact, but later, it is revealed that this is not the case. She was distraught that Shion had lied to her, his confession of love to her was supposedly a tactic to get a one-up over Gyokuran and in the end, the thing that she wanted to avoid the most happened, she was once again valuable to someone else for her Kiche.

Mokuren was the second-to-last of the moon team to die. This was in spite of the fact that she had supposedly been inoculated against the virus that killed the rest of the team — Shukaido had wanted Shion to suffer alone for what he did to Mokuren, and so deceived Shion into believing that he had vaccinated Mokuren. In the sequel, Boku wo Tsutsumu Tsuki no Hikari, which takes place fifteen years later, Alice is married to Rin and they have two children: a son named Ren and later a daughter named Chimako. Alice: Voiced by: Yuri Shiratori (Japanese); Lalainia Lindbjerg (English) Mokuren: Voiced by: Emi Shinohara (Japanese); Ellen Kennedy (English)

=== Rin Kobayashi ===
Rin Kobayashi (小林輪, Kobayashi Rin) is an elementary school student, the seven-year-old neighbor (aging to eight during the series) of Alice Sakaguchi, and has enjoyed tormenting her since she moved in next door. Despite this, Alice is forced to babysit him one day, and at the end of the day the two get into a childish argument over Jinpachi, who they happened to run into while out. In order to anger Alice, Rin grabs the crocus they bought that day and drops it from the fifteenth-story balcony onto the ground. Alice slaps Rin in retaliation, causing him to lose his grip on the railing and fall from the fifteen-story balcony of the apartment. Incredibly, he managed to survive the fall but lapsed into a coma. It is during this coma that Rin relives almost all of Shion's memories in an incredibly compacted amount of time.

After awaking from his coma, Rin begins a plan to communicate with the moonbase using Tokyo Tower. In 1991, Tokyo Tower was being renovated, and Rin used his psychic powers to threaten the contractors into using his blueprints for the renovations. The design would turn Tokyo Tower into a large radio transmitter, capable of broadcasting to the Moon. In order to activate the systems in the moonbase, he needs everyone's passwords. Through blackmail and deception, Rin slowly begins to collect these passwords.

Rin also manipulates his overly-indulgent mother into securing him an engagement to Alice, using Alice's role in his fall from the balcony as blackmail. Although he teases and mocks her frequently, it is discovered that he had loved her ever since regaining Shion's memories and wanted to be with her because he believes she is truly Mokuren. While Alice is reluctant to pursue a relationship with him because of their nine-year age difference, he has no problem with the age gap. Later, he tried to force Alice's awakening as Mokuren since he is positive that Alice is Mokuren, despite her vehement denial. Like the other reincarnates, he desperately wants Alice to regain her memories so she can tell him her password to the moon base computer (which, ironically, is Shion's own name). Alice's first "moon dream" was caused by a telepathic signal that Rin sent into her mind. The process that Rin used was called "Synergetic Cascade" on the moon scientists' homeworld. When he cast the signal, however, he only supplied visual information. He expected Alice to fill in the sounds (which she did) because Mokuren would remember the conversation that took place.

His previous life, Shion was a war orphan born on the moon of Tess who was rescued and sent to Shia from the middle of the conflict on Tess for control of the Homeworld. Shion possessed strong psychic powers and controlled them with ease. He also had a first-rate mind and became a renowned engineer. Shion had serious emotional problems. As an orphan, he did not have a family until he was taken in by a foster father around age six. He was slowly but surely starting to trust and love his foster father, when a terrible accident occurred and his foster father died. He never truly trusted any of his friends, not even his childhood friend Gyokuran, whom Shion ended up hating because of Gyokuran's moral upstandingness and that he was everything that Shion could never be.

Shion was the only male member of the team who did not fawn over Mokuren. In fact, he completely despised her. When it became clear to him that Gyokuran, his childhood rival, was completely obsessed with Mokuren, Shion decided to take advantage of this while sitting in the brig of the Moon Base by "getting to Mokuren first" in order to destroy Gyokuran's being on the most basic level. As a side benefit of this action, he intended to defile the sanctity of the Sarjalim faith, which had abandoned him so many times in the past, by ruining the last of Sarjalim's sacred avatars. And so, he struck a bargain with Mokuren when she came by to give him his lunch one day: "I love you, give up your Kiches powers (lose virginity) and I will reconcile with Gyokuran, no matter what it takes." To this deal, surprisingly, Mokuren agreed. But during the act, Mokuren had a change of heart and resisted, but Shion did not listen and continued, effectively raping her. Afterwards, Mokuren took up ill and Gyokuran, enraged at Shion's perceived actions, demanded permanent exile for Shion. Mokuren, upon hearing of this, pulled herself together and declared that she and Shion had become engaged, and that Gyokuran would let him out of the brig. At this pronouncement, Gyokuran was forced to release Shion from the brig, and Mokuren and Shion moved into Mokuren's quarters together. It is the confusion surrounding these events by all parties involved and not involved that leads to the underlying cause of the dark and terrible nature of the plot of the manga series.

Shion was the last of the moon team to die. He had been inoculated against the virus that was killing them, so lived alone for nine years after Mokuren died. He was unable to commit suicide because Mokuren warned him that people who commit suicide will not be reincarnated. This is why Rin is nine years younger than everyone else. After Mokuren's death, Shion went insane. The cold, ruthless side that Rin sometimes displays is Shion's, and his plan is to make Shukaido suffer. In the sequel, Boku wo Tsutsumu Tsuki no Hikari, which takes place fifteen years later, Rin is married to Alice and they have two children: a son named Ren and later a daughter named Chimako. Rin was 16 when his son was born, and was 18 when he married Alice. Rin: Voiced by: Yumi Touma (Japanese); Christopher Turner (English). Shion: Voiced by: Sho Hayami (Japanese); Paul Dobson (English)

=== Daisuke Dobashi ===
Chronologically speaking, Daisuke Dobashi (土橋大介, Dobashi Daisuke) started having the Moon dreams first, as he started having them when he was seven (Rin recovered his memories at an even younger age, but at a later time, since Rin is much younger than Daisuke). Daisuke spends very little time on-panel in the manga, so not much is known about him. However, he does not trust Haruhiko, whom he believes to be Shion. He is also the only one who realizes the danger that collecting all of the passwords would pose, making it much more difficult for Rin to collect them all.

His previous life, Hiiragi, was a linguist and the team leader. Hiiragi was not shown to do much, and most day-to-day administration of the base seem to have been made by consensus or by Gyokuran. Despite being the base leader he shows up rarely in flashback scenes, even in the long stretches of flashback, both from Shion and Mokuren's perspective, detailing their days before arriving at the Moon base, the daily goings on at the Moon base, and when the situation starts deteriorating on the Moon base after the Homeworld is destroyed. Hiiragi's most important function in the plot was his executive decision to forbid the scientists from evacuating to Earth after their homeworld was destroyed. Hiiragi was the third scientist to die. Voiced by: Nobuo Tobita (Japanese); Ted Cole (English)

=== Haruhiko Kazama ===
Haruhiko Kazama (笠間春彦, Kazama Haruhiko), unlike Sakura and Daisuke, does not see the advertisement in Boo! magazine. Rin runs into him in a uniform store and realizes who he is. Haruhiko is racked with guilt over the terrible thing he did to Shion in his previous life. As such he does everything that Rin tells him, including claiming that he is the reincarnation of Shion. This turns out to be an inspired move. Between Rin's machinations and the piecing together of their moon memories, the other reincarnates begin to fear Haruhiko and what he may be doing to them, even though Haruhiko has not actually done a single thing to any of them. Haruhiko has a very weak heart, due to his excessive use of his extra-sensory perception when he was younger. Haruhiko resembles Shion physically, because Shukaido was obsessed with him when he died. This explained when Haruhiko mentions that his mother is half Indian (making Haruhiko 3/4 Japanese and 1/4 Indian). At the end of the manga, he becomes a writer.

His previous life, Shukaido, was the team's physician. Shukaido tended to stay in the background for the most part. He was in love with Mokuren, as all the male team members were at some point. Shukaido was presented as calm, intelligent, and well-mannered. He was good friends with Gyokuran and Shion during college, and often tried to speak with Shion to defuse his anger over Gyokuran's popularity. Shukaido managed to synthesize a vaccine for the virus that was killing the moon team, however, by that time he had already acquired the virus and only he, Mokuren, and Shion were left. Shukaido was only able to synthesize a single dose, and injected it into Shion. He injected Mokuren with a placebo and claimed that it inoculated her. Shukaido did this to punish Shion because he knew that Shion had raped her. Voiced by: Kappei Yamaguchi (Haruhiko), Yasunori Matsumoto (Shukaido) (Japanese); Jason Gray-Stanford (English)

=== Sakura Kokushou ===
Sakura Kokushou (国生桜, Kokushō Sakura) started having moon dreams around the same time as the others. Sakura attends the same school as Daisuke. They discover each other during a near-fatal traffic accident while on a field trip. Sakura screamed for Sarjalim to save her as her bus was in an uncontrolled skid. Sarjalim was the goddess that the moon scientists worshipped. Daisuke heard this and realized that they had been having the same dreams. Sakura physically resembles Enju. Shusuran had short red hair, and Sakura confessed that she always wished that she had Enju's thick, lustrous hair. Desperate to help Issei get over his unrequited love for Jinpachi, she befriends him to help him move on. Subsequently, they fall in love and become engaged. In Boku wo Tsutsumu Tsuki no Hikari, they have been married for several years and Sakura longs for a child after they fail to conceive, but a miracle happens when she discovers that she is pregnant with their first child.

Her previous life, Shusuran, was Enju's best friend and the two spent many hours gossiping about the goings-on of the moonbase. Shusuran admired not only Enju's looks, but also her ability to fall completely in love. Shusuran admits that she never felt love for anyone (although it is suggested that she did in fact love Enju), and apparently never paired up with anybody on the moonbase. Shusuran served as the team's physicist. She was the second to die. Voiced by: Naoko Matsui (Japanese); Myriam Sirois (English)

=== Issei Nishikiyori ===
Issei Nishikiyori (錦織一成, Nishikiyori Issei) was reborn in a male body because he believed that he could be closer to Gyokuran's next incarnation if they were both males (without the drama of a heterosexual relationship). Issei retains Enju's powers of telepathy. This telepathy caused Jinpachi to start having the moon dreams as well—and it also means that Issei and Jinpachi have the same dreams every night. The close friendship between Enju and Shushuran lasts two lifetimes. When Sakura and Issei meet in the real world, they become best friends once again. Sakura is desperate for Issei to get over his unrequited love for Jinpachi and move on. At the end of the manga, the two of them become engaged. In Boku wo Tsutsumu Tsuki no Hikari, they are married but have been unable to conceive. Eventually, after more than five years of marriage, they discover that they are expecting their first child. Naturally, since he was a male, Issei doesn't physically resemble his former incarnation, Enju, although Sakura does, since Sakura admired Enju's hair.

His previous life, Enju, was an anthropologist with telepathic powers. She had a steadfast love for Gyokuran, despite knowing she would never be able to compete with Mokuren for Gyokuran's attentions. Despite this, she never treated Mokuren badly and never let herself turn bitter. Later on, the two paired after Shion and Mokuren got engaged; however, Gyokuran still loved Mokuren and believed that Shion forced her into the engagement, allowing him to hope that Mokuren did love him back. Because of this, even after they hooked up, Enju's feelings were never really returned by Gyokuran. Shusuran was Enju's best friend and supported her unwaveringly as much as she could through Enju's days of trying to gain Gyokuran's interest. Enju was the fourth to die. Issei: Voiced by: Ryotaro Okiayu (Japanese); Mark Hildreth (English). Enju: Voiced by: Yoshino Takamori (Japanese); Sherry Thoreson (English)

=== Jinpachi Ogura ===
Jinpachi Ogura (小椋迅八, Ogura Jinpachi) is described in the English manga as similar to Clark Kent. Like Gyokuran, he is emotionally immature, preferring to act immediately instead of taking a moment to think about his actions before he does them. He rudely (unintentionally so) rebuffs Issei's advances without a second thought and also later torments Issei by telling him how he has fallen deeply in love with Alice. Jinpachi and Issei are the first reincarnated moon characters that Alice and Rin encounter. Jinpachi is the only character who closely resembles his former incarnation. Aside from the way they part their hair, Gyokuran and Jinpachi are virtually identical. He also retains the power to use "ki" (energy) blasts, and this is first shown when he uses this ki to defeat a group of thugs.

His previous life, Gyokuran, was the team's archaeologist. Gyokuran was Shion's childhood friend; the two also went to school together with Shukaido. Gyokuran possessed psychic powers, but had difficulty controlling them and as a result had to wear special earrings to contain his power. Gyokuran unwittingly became Shion's greatest rival, due to his being everything that Shion could not. When Gyokuran opposed Shion's idea of going down to earth after the Homeworld was destroyed, Shion became belligerent and Gyokuran had him thrown in the anti-Sarches brig. After the rape of Mokuren, Gyokuran went insane with rage at Shion, suggesting he be permanently exiled. Jinpachi says that Gyokuran always admired Shion and cared deeply for him. Rin found this shocking, and refused to believe it. Gyokuran died from the virus first. Voiced by: Toshiyuki Morikawa (Japanese); Tony Sampson (English)

== Earth Characters ==
Hajime Sakaguchi Voiced by: Nozomu Sasaki (Japanese); Marcus Turner (English)
Hajime is Alice Sakaguchi's younger brother. He is very protective of his sister and will do anything to keep her safe. He is incredibly opposed to Alice's engagement with Rin due to her perceived distress at the idea and his general dislike of Rin. Hajime eventually solicits Jinpachi's help in ending the engagement, as Jinpachi seems like a nice guy who genuinely cares about Alice, inadvertently cluing Jinpachi into the secret engagement to which he and the others had, up to this point, been ignorant. Hajime is the only one in Alice's family who unflinchingly believes in her supernatural abilities and the ludicrous stories that go along with them.
Kyoko Nishikiyori
Kyoko is the younger sister of Issei, and she is completely infatuated with her older brother. She expresses comical childish irritation any time he gets a phone call, especially from a girl, or shows any particular interest in other girls, whether romantic or not. While her role was not significant to the plot of the manga (she never appeared in the anime), she seems to be an attempt to make up for the lack of comedy in the story. Whenever Issei is angsting out the most about his bad romantic position among the reincarnates (and happens to be at home), you can count on Kyoko making an appearance and setting him straight.
Raozo Matsudaira Voiced by: Jō Fujimoto (Japanese); Paul Dobson (English)
Mr. Matsudaira was the leader of the Yakuza gang that took Tamura and his younger brother in when they were both very young. Mr. Matsudaira tasked Tamura at this time to take care of his son, Takashi, a job that he still performs to this day even though Matsudaira's Yakuza gang has since gone legitimate, as Matsudaira Corp., a construction company. Mr. Matsudaira cares a great deal about Tamura, says he thinks of him as a son, and is seen giving Tamura advice many times throughout the story, from how to deal with the death of his brother, how to deal with "S", to just general life advice.
Takashi Matsudaira Voiced by: Isshin Chiba
The teenage son of Mr. Matsudaira and the leader of the Bakuto biker gang. "S" used Takashi for a couple of things: 1) to stage an attack on Tsuwabuki High School against Jinpachi and Issei in order to get Gyokuran's psychic powers inside of Jinpachi to manifest themselves and 2) to include some of "S's" own modifications to Tokyo Tower during the reconstruction effort being performed by Matsudaira Corp, Takashi's father's construction company. Later, Takashi is targeted again by "S", but this time, only to draw Tamura out so that "S" can take care of Tamura for good.
Tamura's Brother
Tamura's brother, who is spoke of many times in the story, but whose name is never mentioned and is only shown twice in manga vol 18 (pages 120-121), died a few years after Matsudaira took the two brothers in. For most of the story, it is portrayed as an inexplicable suicide because Tamura didn't spend enough time with him, that Tamura feels eternally guilty over. It is the reason why Tamura seems to care so much about children and is all but a nanny to his charge, Takashi Matsudaira. Later it is revealed that Tamura's brother believed himself to be the cause of Tamura becoming Yakuza, and in order to put things right, he begged Masaki Majima to put an end to his feud with Tamura. When Majima blew him off, Tamura's brother drowned himself and sent Majima a letter saying that he begged Majima with his life to put an end to the feud. Mikuro, who can see and speak with the ghosts, allows conversation to pass between the two brothers (Tamura's brother seems to always follow him around) so that they can come to terms with these events finally. Mikuro has remarked on at least one occasion that Tamura's brother looks quite a bit like Haruhiko (and Majima confirms this), which explains why Tamura's brother seems very interested in helping Haruhiko.
Ayako Okamura Voiced by: Yūko Kobayashi (Japanese); Janyse Jaud (English)
An associate of Tamura's and a piano teacher. She helps keep Alice safe when Rin is searching for her and keeps an eye on Haruhiko when he is ill several times. Tamura is constantly teased about when he is going to finally marry Ayako.
Kazuto Tamura Voiced by: Jurota Kosugi (Japanese); Michael Dobson (English)
Servant/bodyguard for the wealthy Matsudaira family and friend/father figure to Haruhiko. Years ago, Matsudaira Raozou adopted Tamura and his brother, who were orphans. Tamura was given the job of caring for Matsudaira's son Takashi, and he dedicated his life to it. Tamura's younger brother became lonely as a result and eventually killed himself. Tamura was overcome by remorse, blaming himself for not having noticed any problems and went to Matsudaira to resign. Matsudaira struck him in response and told him to make up for his mistake instead of running away- to learn what it really meant to protect someone.
Because of this, he is completely devoted to Takashi and becomes troubled when he learns that Takashi is being blackmailed into taking Razou's blueprints of the Tokyo Tower. He decides to meet the mysterious 'S' in his place, and after the fateful meeting his ribs are broken by Rin's newly found ESP. After receiving a premonition of this, Haruhiko teleports to Tamura shortly before his hospitalization.
When Tamura is released, he notices that Haruhiko's mother is distraught, and she reveals that Haruhiko has locked himself in his room. After entering his home and coaxing himself into the room, he sees what appears to be deep space and a man he never saw before (Shukaido). Tamura begs Haruhiko to tell him what's wrong, but is refused and he disappears in Tamura's arms.
Mikuro Yakushimaru Voiced by: Toshihiko Seki (Japanese); Matt Hill (English)
A human with ESP and the younger step-brother of Hokuto. Tamura contacted him through his brother, Hokuto, for advice about dealing with Rin and Haruhiko. During their meeting, Mikuro learns of Haruhiko disappearing in Tamura's arms and infers that Haruhiko isn't human, or else Tamura would have been teleported with him since they were touching. He also expresses to Tamura that he must have some special connection to Haruhiko if he was able to see Haruhiko's visions with him, including Haruhiko's alter-ego, Shukaido. Mikuro later meets with Haruhiko at an aquarium, telling him in a note to be careful about teleporting too often, as it was making his heart even weaker. After Rin learns that Haruhiko has been involved with Tamura and Mikuro, he decides to eliminate the two humans. Aside from this, Mikuro frequently speaks with Tamura's dead brother, who always seems to be with Tamura, relaying information between the two. In Boku wo Tsutsumu Tsuki no Hikari, it revealed that he had a casual relationship with an American friend, Pamela, with whom he has a daughter named Kackiko, who is the best friend of Ren, Alice and Rin's son.
Hokuto Yakushimaru Voiced by: Ryō Horikawa (Japanese); Ward Perry (English)
Hokuto is an old friend of Tamura's from the days when the organization Tamura works for was illegitimate/Yakuza. Also being Mikuro's older step-brother, Hokuto makes it possible for Tamura to get in touch with Mikuro in order to help Tamura figure out what is wrong with Haruhiko and how to deal with Rin.
Mrs. Yakushimaru
Mrs. Yakushimaru is Hokuto's biological mother and Mikuro's adoptive mother. Mrs. Yakushimaru was the woman who carried Mikuro to term as his surrogate mother, and finally adopted him at the age of 5 when his biological mother disowned him, believing the psychic powers he began to exhibit made him a monster. She is VERY protective of Mikuro, and gave Tamura a full dressing down at least once over his involvement with her son. Later, she was the one who impressed upon Tamura the need to save Rin as well as Haruhiko. Tamura took this lecture to heart and makes sure he keeps Rin's interests in mind while they desperately try to defuse Shion's influence over him.
Mrs. Kobayashi Voiced by: Chiyoko Kawashima (Japanese); Sarah-Anne Dafoe (English)
Rin's mother, Mrs. Kobayashi, plays a significant role in the series. It is her intuition as a mother that allows her to see that her son is no longer himself. In vol 13 of the manga, Rin's mother, who had up to this point spoiled him rotten, giving him anything he ever wanted and allowing him to do anything he wants, yells at him, "Who ARE you! You're not my son!". This severe divergence from her typical personality of spoiling him causes him to teleport himself away in abject fear despite already being injured, further injuring himself, and thereby sending him into hiding for the rest of the manga. Because of this, once the other reincarnates find out Rin is Shion instead of Shukaido and that he has been lying to them, the situation becomes even more desperate because they cannot locate him.
Masaki Majima
A former Yakuza, Masaki was Tamura of the Matsudaira group's direct rival in the Kawakida group during the time when the both groups were still illegitimate and fighting each other. Since the two groups have both gone clean, he and Tamura have a silent pact to stay out of each other's business, which up to this point, has not been broken. Until now. Rin, practicing his ESP powers, manages to fake several bullet wounds in one of Masaki's people and spreads rumors that it was Tamura's doing. In this way, Rin is able to manipulate Masaki into doing all sorts of favors for him at the expense of Tamura and the other six reincarnates.

Dr. Mori (left) and Boone (right) watch in awe after Rin (center) wakes up.

Boone
A bum that finds Rin dying in some bushes after Rin frantically teleports from the hospital after his mother yells at him. Boone solicits the help of Dr. Mori, an illegit street doctor, in order to provide discreet medical care to the child. Boone knows about Ginta's (Rin's current pseudonym) psychic powers and frequently observes Ginta's suspicious behavior while he's recovering, but does not judge him for it. Boone recognizes that it seems Ginta cannot go home for some reason and tells him to stay at the Dr's house until he feels he can return. In order to help pay for Ginta's medical care and housing at the Dr's house, Boone decides to get a job as a construction worker. Due to his character design and behavior, Boone is essentially recognizable as the reincarnation of La Zlo.
Dr. Mori
Dr Mori is a licensed doctor, who used to work at a hospital, but got sick of the politics and quit. These days he does not maintain a legitimate practice and takes patients only by word of mouth, keeping all of these procedures hush-hush. He doesn't deal much with the police, not wanting to draw attention to his illegitimate practice, but he does have ties to the Yakuza, who frequently need under-the-table medical attention. He knows Majima of the former Kawakida Yakuza gang. Rin, going by the pseudonym Ginta, is rescued by the bum, Boone, a former patient of Dr. Mori's, and brought to Dr. Mori's house for treatment. Ginta remains as a resident at Dr. Mori's house until the end of the series.

== Alien Characters ==
Rojion Voiced by: Akira Ishida
Mokuren's Father. Marj calls him "Roja" for short. He was a Kiches Sarjalian like Mokuren. He in particular of the Kiches was very sensitive to the emotions of others, which is why Marj, Mokuren's mother, liked him so much (she enjoys teasing him and making him cry). He met Marj in "Paradise" and they both decided to give up their Kiches in order to get married and have Mokuren. He attempts to rescue Mokuren from "Paradise" after she is stolen away from them at the age of three years. While he is successful, he dies not long after due to male Kiches' severely shortened lifespan.
Marj
Mokuren's Mother. She was a Kiches Sarjalian just like Mokuren and her father. She met Mokuren's father in "Paradise" and they both decided to give up their Kiches in order to get married and have Mokuren. It was Mokuren's mother who told her the prophetic line, "All human beings have the power to create a single miracle, even without a Kiche," when she was referring to how she and Roja's miracle was Mokuren. Mokuren remembers this line her whole life and invokes her one miracle when she is having a seizure on the Moon Base due to being infected with the disease, forcing her spirit to jump into the future to save Rin from his 15 story fall.
Mokuren's Grandparents
Just before Mokuren turned three, her grandparents showed up, and through various despicable means, kidnapped her and gave her to the state out of greed against her parents' wishes. At this time her name was changed from Shin Raki Sei Te Mokuren to Ko Hass Sei Te Moku Ren (spacing intentional).
Lian Mode
Every Kiches Sarjalian has an assistant, and Mode was Mokuren's Lian assistant while she lived in "Paradise" and after. In addition to being her assistant, Mode was Mokuren's only female friend her entire life.
Sev Oru
Sev Oru is a young boy that Mokuren befriends when she was a teenager after she snuck out of "Paradise" one day in order to interact with the real world. Mokuren decides that she would use him to get rid of her Kiches powers in the same manner that her parents had, but Sev Oru's father is staunchly opposed the idea because of Mokuren's Kiches nature. Later, Sev Oru's father, a circus performer, is injured at work and when Sev Oru appeals to Mokuren to heal him and she cannot, he turns his back on her.
Kiches Sarjalian Elder Voiced by: Hisako Kyōda
The Eldest of the Kiches Sarjalian, the Doyenne, the Elder has a particular liking for Mokuren due to her irreverence. Kiches of the Elder's age and experience are able to magically heal humans in addition to speaking with plants and making them grow. The Elder is the one who presents Mokuren with her Kiches prophecy, telling her that she will "remain a Kiches for the rest of [her] life" and "you can still fall in love, but only FALL in love, no more than that". Later, when Mokuren requests to go to ZKK-101, she goes to speak to the Elder, who shockingly approved such a ludicrous venture, and there, she is told, "you will go to [ZKK-101]... and there you will experience a rebirth. Something about you will be reborn." Mokuren is again reminded of this second prophecy in a post-mortem message (natural causes) while she is on ZKK-101.

Coco Voiced by: Wakana Yamazaki
Tima Ti Se Coco Su is a girl Shion and Gyokuran fought over during college, further widening the rift between them. It is mentioned later by Sakura that perhaps Rin's classmate Ayumi is the reincarnation of Coco.
Lian Karsh Voiced by: Junko Midori
The only person Shion cares about throughout his terrible childhood during his fostering with La ZLo and after La ZLo dies. She is a Lian, or "priestess", of the Sarjalim faith. Shion is informed of her death due to pneumonia at the age of 51 while on the Moon Base.
La Zlo Voiced by: Kinryū Arimoto (Japanese); Tobias Harris (English)
Shion's kind and patient foster father and veeda, one who guides those with special talents, after Shion had been rescued from the war-torn Tess. After only 78 days, La Zlo dies in a car accident while Shion is at school. La Zlo is from whom Shion realized what it was that he truly wanted from someone, anyone, in life, the space that Mokuren unwittingly filled later on the moon base.
Kyaa Voiced by: Tamao Hayashi
The alien pet and companion of La Zlo, Shion's foster father. Appears as a giant cat. Kyaa dies in a car accident with La ZLo while Shion is at school.
Kyaa Junior
After finishing college and becoming gainfully employed as an engineer working for the state, Shion buys his own giant alien cat and names him Kyaa Junior, after La Zlo's Kyaa. Shion is later forced to sell Kyaa Junior to his vet for a loss while he is stationed on the Moon Base due to Kyaa Junior getting sick and the Lians not being able to afford his vet bill. Shion's purchase of Kyaa Junior, despite the ridiculous expense since this type of alien is considered an extremely exotic pet, was Shion's way of attempting to reclaim the life he began with La Zlo and Kyaa.
