= Japanese invasion of Cotabato =

Japanese invasion of Cotabato City
- Part of Sakaguchi Landings
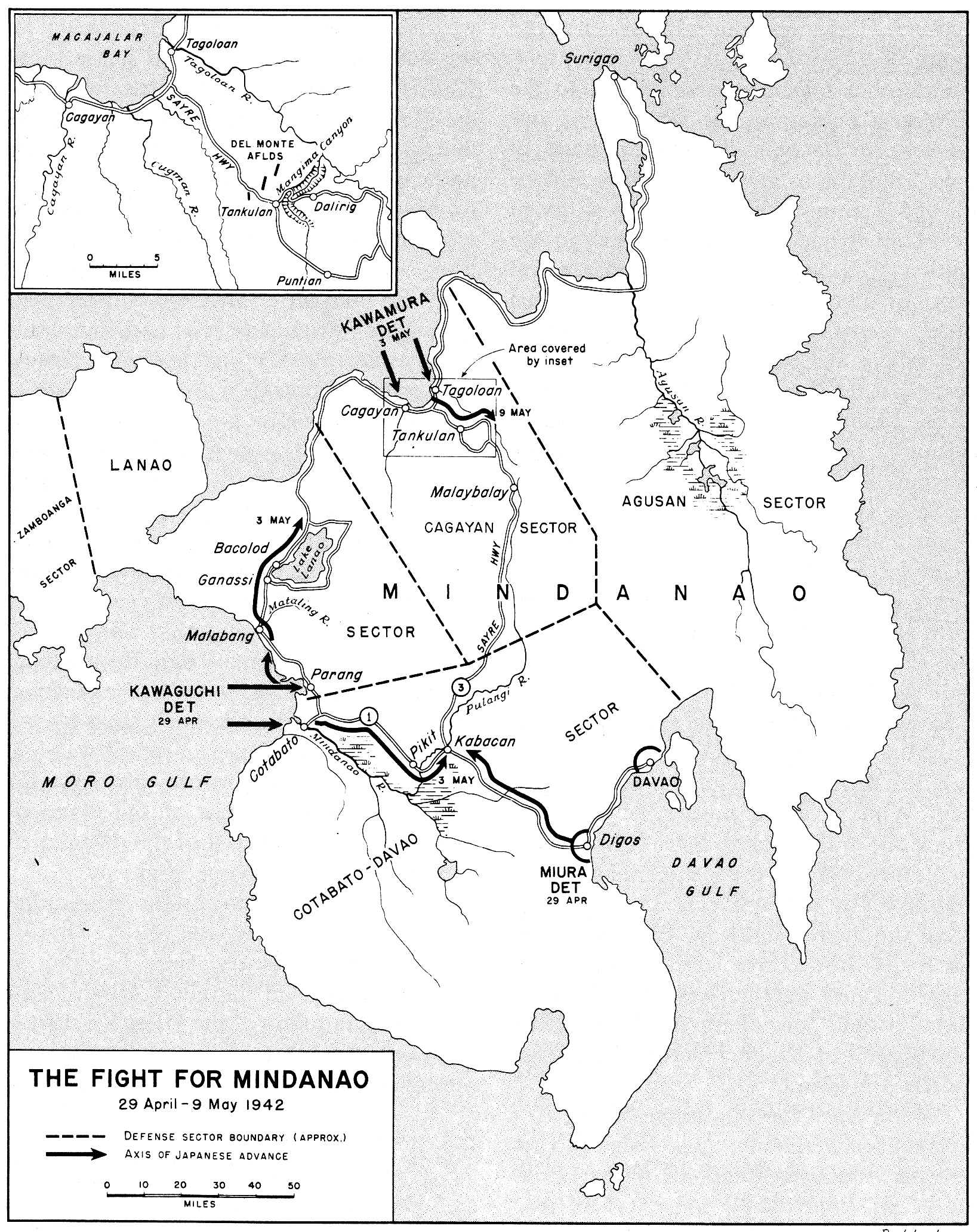
Date	April 29, 1942 – May 12, 1942
Location	Cotabato, Cotabato
Result	Japanese victory

Belligerents
United States of America: Commonwealth of the Philippines	Empire of Japan

Commanders and leaders
(United States) William F. Sharp (United States) Joseph P. Vachon (United States) Russell J. Nelson (United States) William Baldwin (United States) Paul Schultz (Commonwealth of the Philippines) Calixto Duque (Commonwealth of the Philippines) Francisco Donesa	(Empire of Japan) Kawaguchi Kiyotake

Units involved
"""Ground Units:"""" Mindanao Force: 101st Infantry Division; 102nd Infantry Regiment; 2nd Battalion; 104th Infantry Regiment; 2nd Battalion; 103rd Infantry Regiment; 3rd Battalion; 101st Field Artillery; 2nd Battalion; Philippine Constabulary: 3rd PC Infantry Regiment; Air units: US Army Air Corps: 28th US Bombardment Squadron	"""Ground units:""": Kawaguchi Detachment; 9th Infantry Brigade; Armored Detachment; Artillery Detachment

Strength
4,600 Troops 2x QF 2.95inch Guns	3,560 Troops 4 Destroyers 18 Armored Vehicles Artillery Guns

Japanese invasion of Cotabato (Filipino: Paglusob ng mga Hapones sa Cotabato) is one of the three landings made by the Japanese Army during their siege of Mindanao.

The landings in west coast of Mindanao took place in Zamboanga City in Zamboanga Province, Malabang in Lanao Province, and in towns Cotabato and Parang of Cotabato Province. Kawaguchi Detachment objective was to move towards Kabacan and link up with Muira Detachment who was driving west from Digos, Davao to control Sayre Highway from the southern terminus of it, which under the area of responsibility of 101st Infantry Division assigned in Cotabato-Davao Sector.

Japanese was able to reached their objective on May 3, 1942, which created confusion among the troops of the Filipino and Americans defending the area due to sudden infiltration of the Japanese in Pikit town just few miles from Kabacan. The landing further inland in Pikit gave more complications on the Cotabato subsector forces forcing the Digos subsector to retreat to Kabacan.

== Background ==
In December 1941, General Vachon sent forces to Davao and Cotabato respectively to thwart any Japanese landings on these two fronts who aiming to reach Kabacan and control Sayre Highway. Vachon sent Lieutenant Colonel Russell J. Nelson to establish Cotabato Subsector force, he brought along 2nd Battalion, 102nd Infantry under Major William Baldwin to reinforce 2nd Regular Regiment of the Philippine Army under Lieutenant Colonel Calixto Duque who is based in Camp Luna in Parang overlooking the Polloc Harbor and the 3rd PC Infantry Regiment under Lieutenant Colonel Francisco Donesa.

While Japanese landed in Davao on December 20, 1941, Cotabato subsector was not hit until April 1942. Nelson tried strengthened his sector but 3rd PC Regiment under Lieutenant Colonel Francisco Donesa was pulled out and sent to Digos subsector to reinforced the forces there. In March, 2nd Battalion 104th Infantry under Captain John Natola was sent to reinforced Cotabato.

== Combat narratives ==
On April 29, 1942 Kawaguchi Detachment arrived in the coast of Illana Bay. The made landings at dawn at Cotabato and Parang towns in Cotabato province on April 29, 1942, supported by naval and aircraft from Zamboanga.

=== Parang ===
Colonel Duque's 2nd Infantry Regiment with over 600 men composed of newly recruited school boys delayed the Japanese for 4 hours at their beachhead with their stubborn resistance. Duque position his mean above the hill overlooking Polloc Harbor. However, Duque was forced to withdraw after Cotabato was easily sieged and the control of the highway was taken by the Japanese. To avoid being cutoff he retreated towards Malabang. 2nd Infantry Regiment now assigned to 81st Infantry Division under Brigadier General Guy O. Fort. Later Colonel Duque became 81st Division selected as its chief of staff.

=== Cotabato ===
Colonel Nelson deployed the 2nd Battalion, 102nd Infantry under Major William Baldwin at the outskirt of the town support by 1st Battalion, 104th Infantry along the Pikit-Cotabato road. Soon, Japanese was able to sieged the town and in command of the highway Cotabato-Lanao Road. Nelson's troops gave a brave stand but a Japanese force was sent through the Mindanao River to make a land in Pikit with the help of Pro-Japanese Moros under Datu Sinsuat who served as guides. This worried Nelson more as he feared of being cutoff.

General Vachon sent 1st Battalion, 103rd Infantry to thwart this landing in Pikit. The landing in Pikit brought the Cotabato-Davao Sector into its knees as Digos Force was forced to retreat to Kabacan to avoid being cutoff if Japanese reach Kabacan. Fighting was instense and it reached Midsayap and General Vachon ordered Colonel Graves to retreat to Kabacan with his units who gave a stubborn resistance of Muira Detachment trying to reach Kabacan.

== Aftermath ==
101st Division was still firmly in control of Kabacan with his troops still fighting in Midsayap and Mlang but the Cagayan Sector was fast crumbling and could no longer put a line of resistance. General Sharp ordered all units in Mindanao to surrender on May 12, 1942, but only few surrender a vast number of 101st Division soldiers went to the hills and later joined guerilla movement among them the young and energetic young Moro officer Captain Salipada Pendatun who later became a senator.
