= Global Garden =

Japanese manga series

- Cover of the first volume
- Genre: Mystery, Sci-fi
- Manga
- Written by: Saki Hiwatari
- Published by: Hakusensha
- Magazine: Hana to Yume
- Original run: August 4, 2001 – December 4, 2004
- Volumes: 8

Global Garden (stylized in all caps) is a manga by Saki Hiwatari, who is best known as the creator of Please Save My Earth.

The series was published in Hakusensha's Hana to Yume which comes out bi-weekly in Japan. The series is completed at 8 volumes.

== Story ==
The story begins in Princeton, New Jersey, 1954, with Albert Einstein. Einstein is living in regret of his discovery of mass-energy equivalence (E = mc²), believing it led to the construction of the atomic bomb.

He meets two children, Hikaru and Haruhi, who can see the past and future in their dreams. They tell him that ever since the atomic bombing of Hiroshima and Nagasaki, Yggdrasil, the tree of life, is dying.

However they discover that in the future there is a girl with special powers who saves the tree. Einstein then gives them drugs which slow their aging so they can meet this girl. He dies later the same day; April 18, 1955. He then becomes the story's disembodied narrator, following around the young boy Robin.

In Tokyo, 2005, Hikaru and Robin finally find the girl, Ruika. Ruika is pretending to be her young brother Masato, who died in an airplane crash, to keep her mother from grieving.

== Characters ==
- Hikaru – A 'young' man driven by his need to meet a Goddess in the Global Garden. Since childhood, he has experienced dreams of her in several forms. He was given a pill to slow his aging, and though he's 60, he appears 18 or so. His mission is to save the Earth via a wish in the Global Garden. However, he finds the 'Goddess' in her human form a more important reason to live.
- Haruhi – Another 'young' man driven by the same needs as Hikaru. However, Haruhi is twisted and selfish in his methods to secure the Goddess. He seems to care for no one except himself and his own wishes.
- Robin – A seemingly cheerful and friendly mute boy. He was adopted by Hikaru after his adoptive parents died in a car accident. Oddly mature at times, this child is actually the clone of two people—the famous Einstein, and Hikaru himself. Eventually he receives the other 'half' of Hikaru's soul, and some of Einstein's memories. Then he realizes his true purpose—he is the key to the Global Garden. This came with nothing but anguish for the boy—it was at the cost of Hikaru's life. Robin didn't want to live without the people he loved and who were treasured family to him.
- Ruika – The 'Goddess' in her present form, also called Verdandi. Ruika is a young girl trying desperately to live as her brother Masato, who died years before. Her mother would only see her as her brother. When she meets Hikaru and Robin, she begins to change and want to be herself, the girl Ruika who was buried for so long. She also learns to use the power within her.
- Albert Einstein

== Volumes ==
No.	Japanese release date	Japanese ISBN
1	February 2002	4-592-17148-9
2	July 2002	4-592-17149-7
3	November 2002	4-592-17150-0
4	March 2003	4-592-17151-9
5	September 2003	4-592-17152-7
6	June 2004	4-592-17330-9
7	October 2004	4-592-17331-7
8	March 2005	4-592-17099-7
