= Saki Hiwatari =

Japanese manga artist

Saki Hiwatari 日渡 早紀
- Born: July 5, 1961 (age 65) Kanagawa Prefecture
- Area: Manga artist
- Notable works: Please Save My Earth

Saki Hiwatari (日渡 早紀, Hiwatari Saki; born July 5, 1961) is a Japanese manga artist best known for her science fiction series Please Save My Earth and its sequels, which she has worked on for most of her career.

== Life and career ==
Hiwatari's parents owned a bookstore while she was growing up, which gave her easy access to reading books, magazines and manga. She especially liked the science fiction novels of Shinichi Hoshi and Yasutaka Tsutsui as well as manga by Osamu Tezuka, Hideko Mizuno, Yumiko Oshima, Moto Hagio, Keiko Takemiya as well as Ritusko Abe's Suekko Taifū, Mitsuteru Yokoyama's Babel II and Masami Kurumada's Saint Seiya.

Her first work, Mahōtsukai wa Shitteiru (I Know a Magician) was published in the weekly anthology Hana to Yume (Flowers and Dreams) in 1982. Her best-known work was Please Save My Earth, a 21-volume series concerning several alien scientists who are reincarnated as high school students in modern Tokyo. The series was adapted into an anime and translated into several languages.

After finishing Please Save My Earth, she was troubled about not creating another series as successful as her previous one. With the creation of Global Garden, this feeling disappeared.

== Style ==
In a 2022 interview, she said that her current work is created completely digitally.

== Works ==
- Saki Series (早紀シリーズ, Saki Shirīzu)
  - Mahōtsukai wa Shitteiru (魔法使いは知っている) (January 20, 1982, published in Hana to Yume, Hakusensha)
  - Tsutaete Voyager (伝えてボイジャー, Tsutaete Boijā) (July 20, 1982, published in Hana to Yume, Hakusensha)
  - 1000 Oku no Tomodachi (1000億のともだち, Sen Oku no Tomodachi) (October 27, 1982, published in Hana to Yume, Hakusensha)
  - —m7— (—m7—, Emu Sebun) (February 19, 1983, published in Hana to Yume, Hakusensha)
  - Hoshi wa, Subaru. (星は、すばる。) (July 5, 1983, published in Hana to Yume, Hakusensha)
  - 11 Gatsu no Fomalhaut (11月のフォーマルハウト, Jū Ichi Gatsu no Fōmaruhauto) (November 5, 1983, published in Hana to Yume, Hakusensha)
  - Hoshino Shōnen (星野少年) (December 10, 1983, published in Bessatsu Hana to Yume, Hakusensha)
  - Wakusei Tachi wa Isogashii (惑星たちは忙しい) (March 19, 1984, published in Hana to Yume, Hakusensha)
  - Ginga no Kaizoku (銀河の海賊) (August 4, 1984, published in Hana to Yume, Hakusensha)
  - Mugen Kidō (無限軌道) (January 7, 1985, published in Hana to Yume, Hakusensha)
  - Neko Nanka Daikirai (猫なんか大嫌い) (March 20, 1985 – April 5, 1985, serialized in Hana to Yume, Hakusensha)
- Akuma-Kun Series (アクマくんシリーズ, Akuma-Kun Shirīzu)
  - Akuma-Kun ni Onegai (アクマくんにお願い) (May 4, 1982, published in Hana to Yume, Hakusensha)
  - Akuma-Kun Yumemiru Tsubasa (アクマくん 夢みる翼) (October 5, 1982, published in Hana to Yume, Hakusensha)
  - Akuma-Kun Kiken na Koibito '83 (アクマくん 危険な恋人'83, Akuma-Kun Kiken na Koibito Eitī Surī) (January 6, 1983, published in Hana to Yume, Hakusensha)
  - Akuma-Kun Angel Ring o Motta Majo (アクマくん 天使の輪をもった魔女, Akuma-Kun Enjeru Ringu o Motta Majo) (April 20, 1983, published in Hana to Yume, Hakusensha)
  - Akuma-Kun Black Queen ni Sasagu (アクマくん 黒の女王に捧ぐ, Akuma-Kun Burakku Kwīn ni Sasagu) (April 27, 1983, published in Hana to Yume, Hakusensha)
  - Akuma-Kun Makai Kitte no Rokudenashi (アクマくん 魔界きってのろくでなし) (August 20, 1983 – October 5, 1983, serialized in Hana to Yume, Hakusensha)
  - Akuma-Kun Boku wa Tenshi ni Naritai (アクマくん ぼくは天使になりたい) (January 20, 1984, published in Hana to Yume, Hakusensha)
  - Yoru ga Kieta Yoru (夜が消えた夜) (July 19, 1984, published in Akuma-Kun Boku wa Tenshi ni Naritai, Hakusensha)
  - Akuma-Kun Black Minion (アクマくん ブラック・ミニオン, Akuma-Kun Burakku Minion) (September 5, 1984 – November 20, 1984, serialized in Hana to Yume, Hakusensha)
  - Akuma-Kun Magic Bitter (アクマくん 魔法★BITTER, Akuma-Kun Majikku Bitā) (July 20, 1985 – July 5, 1986, serialized in Hana to Yume, Hakusensha)
  - Akuma-Kun Magic Sweet (アクマくん 魔法★SWEET, Akuma-Kun Majikku Suīto) (September 5, 1986 – September 20, 1986, serialized in Hana to Yume, Hakusensha)
- Vivid Remembrance (記憶鮮明, Kioku Senmei)
  - Vivid Remembrance (記憶鮮明, Kioku Senmei) (May 4, 1984 – June 5, 1984, serialized in Hana to Yume, Hakusensha)
  - Soshite Kanojo wa Ryōme o Fusagu (そして彼女は両眼を塞ぐ) (March 9, 1985, published in Bessatsu Hana to Yume, Hakusensha)
  - Passion Color (PASSION COLOR, Passhon Karā) (June 10, 1985, published in Hana Yume Epo, Hakusensha)
  - Cibi-01 no Ya! Ya! Ya! (CIBI-01のYA!YA!YA!, Chibi Zero Wan no Ya! Ya! Ya!) (January 28, 1987 – May 28, 1988, serialized in Hana Yume Epo, Hakusensha)
  - Gūzen ga Nokosu Mono – Vivid Remembrance II (偶然が残すもの—記憶鮮明 II, Gūzen ga Nokosu Mono Kioku Senmei Ni) (July 5, 1997 – August 5, 1997, serialized in Hana to Yume, Hakusensha)
  - Birth – Vivid Remembrance III (BIRTH—記憶鮮明 III, Bāsu Kioku Senmei San) (April 5, 1999, published in Hana to Yume, Hakusensha)
- Please Save My Earth (ぼくの地球を守って, Boku no Chikyū o Mamotte) (December 20, 1986 – May 20, 1994, serialized in Hana to Yume, Hakusensha); spin-off of Vivid Remembrance
- Tower of the Future (未来のうてな, Mirai no Utena) (September 5, 1994 – December 19, 1998, serialized in Hana to Yume, Hakusensha)
- Chotto Tsuki made (ちょっと月まで) (August 11, 1998, published in Melody, Hakusensha)
- Cosmos in Children (宇宙なボクら!, Kosumo na Bokura!) (August 5, 1999 – January 5, 2001, serialized in Hana to Yume, Hakusensha)
- Ie no Naka ni Nanika Iru! (家の中に何かいる!) (June 28, 2001, published in The Hana to Yume, Hakusensha)
- Global Garden (GLOBAL GARDEN, Gurōbaru Gāden) (August 4, 2001 – December 4, 2004, serialized in Hana to Yume, Hakusensha)
- Embraced by the Moonlight (ボクを包む月の光, Boku o Tsutsumu Tsuki no Hikari) (September 26, 2003 – November 26, 2014, serialized in Bessatsu Hana to Yume and Hana to Yume Plus, Hakusensha); sequel to Please Save My Earth
- Kimi wa Tomodachi (キミは友達) (May 26, 2009, published in Bessatsu Hana to Yume, Hakusensha); Embraced by the Moonlight short story
- Ame no Hi no Picnic (雨の日のピクニック, Ame no Hi no Pikunikku) (September 26, 2014, published in Bessatsu Hana to Yume, Hakusensha); Please Save My Earth short story
- I Sing with the Earth (ぼくは地球と歌う, Boku wa Chikyū to Utau) (March 26, 2015–ongoing, serialized in Bessatsu Hana to Yume, Hakusensha); sequel to Embraced by the Moonlight
- You've Got a Friend (ゆーがった ふれんど, Yūgatta Furendo) (February 19, 2016, published in the Please Save My Earth Premium Fan Book, Hakusensha); Please Save My Earth short story
