= Donald Sakaguchi =

Neuroscientist

Donald S. Sakaguchi is a neuroscientist.

Sakaguchi earned his bachelor's and doctoral degrees in biology from the University at Albany, SUNY, then pursued postdoctoral research at the University of California, San Diego. He joined the Iowa State University faculty in 1991.

In 2018, Sakaguchi was appointed to a Morrill Professorship. Two years later, he was named director of undergraduate programs for biology and genetics. In 2023, Sakaguchi served on the search committee convened after Beate Schmittmann announced her retirement as dean of the Iowa State University College of Liberal Arts and Sciences.
