= Embraced by the Moonlight =

Japanese manga series

- First tankōbon volume cover

ボクを包む月の光 (Boku o Tsutsumu Tsuki no Hikari)
- Genre: Sci-Fi
- Manga
- Written by: Saki Hiwatari
- Published by: Hakusensha
- Magazine: Bessatsu Hana to Yume
- Original run: September 26, 2003 – November 26, 2014
- Volumes: 15
- Manga

I Sing with the Earth
- Written by: Saki Hiwatari
- Published by: Hakusensha
- Magazine: Melody
- Original run: March 28, 2015 – present
- Volumes: 9

Embraced by the Moonlight (Japanese: ボクを包む月の光, Hepburn: Boku o Tsutsumu Tsuki no Hikari) is a science fiction manga series by Saki Hiwatari. It was published by Hakusensha in the monthly manga magazine Bessatsu Hana to Yume from its November 2003 issue to its January 2015 one. It is a sequel to Please Save My Earth, one of Hiwatari's previous works and the short story Things Accidentally Left Behind featured in the anthology manga Vivid Memories II. The series features the two focus characters of that series, Alice Sakaguchi (now Kobayashi) and Rin Kobayashi. They are married, and their child, seven-year-old Ren, is the main character of the series. Many of the characters from Please Save My Earth reappear in this one. It also reprises a lot of the ESP-related themes that the original series dealt with. The series was collected into 15 volumes. A sequel titled I Sing with the Earth (ぼくは地球と歌う, Boku wa Chikyū to Utau) started serialization in Bessatsu Hana to Yume in 2015 and later was moved to Melody in 2018 after the former magazines closed.

== Characters ==
=== Main characters ===
- Ren Kobayashi

Rin and Alice's 7-year-old son (he later turns 8). Born four years after the ending of Please Save My Earth, Rin was 16 and Alice was 25 when Ren was born, and they married two years later. He resembles Rin in appearance and personality. Unlike his parents, Ren possesses no psychic abilities, unless he is in the presence of Shion and Mokuren, whom he considers as his guardian angels and thinks of them as secondary parents. At the end of the series, it is discovered that Ren is the reincarnation of Ryouji, Mokuren's father. He is an outgoing, cheerful, and adventurous young boy who is always by the side of his best friend, Kachiko, who Ren seems to have romantic feelings for, although he tends to deny it because he is embarrassed or doesn't recognize his feelings as something more than friendship. He loves both of his parents deeply and is protective of them. It is revealed his father, Rin, named him after Mokuren. In later chapters, it turns out he does possess psychic abilities that had been in a dormant state since his birth, and awakened when he was able to see his father's role in the events of the first series. This causes him to develop a split personality disorder, which Shion and Mokuren help him keep under control by telling him how his existence is treasured by them and the planet. In return, he vows that he will be the person who can protect the Earth.

- Rin Kobayashi

Ren's father and Alice's husband. He is 23 years old (later 24). When he was 15, he discovered that Alice was pregnant with his child, and he was 16 when Ren was born. He was the one who chose the name "Ren" in honor of Mokuren. Rin married Alice two years later, as soon as he turned 18. Although he is an adult, Rin still retains his playful and childish personality, but he can be serious and perceptive when necessary. He is a loving husband to Alice and father to Ren. In chapter 38, it is discovered that Alice is pregnant with their second child, which will be a girl and Ren names his daughter Chimako. In the later part of the series, it is discovered that due to Shion subconsciously giving his powers to the unborn Chimako, Rin will die five years in the future. However, due to interference by Ren and Chiyako from the future, they are able to save Rin and he will live a long life with his family. He is a freelance composer but does part-time jobs when he can't find work. He is the reincarnation of Shion.

- Alice Kobayashi (née Sakaguchi)

Ren's mother and Rin's wife. She is now 32 years old (later 33). When she was 24 and Rin was 15, she became pregnant with his child and gave birth to their son Ren at age 25. When Ren was about two years old, Alice and Rin got married. She is a loving wife to Rin and mother to Ren. She worries about Ren developing his own psychic abilities, as she is afraid her son will endure similar hardships she and Rin endured in the original series. In chapter 38, it is revealed that she is pregnant with their second child, which will be a girl named Chimako. She is a vocalist and has a special connection to plants. She is the reincarnation of Mokuren.

- Shion

The previous life of Rin from Please Save My Earth. In the events after the first series, Shion has lived in peace with Mokuren and watching over Rin, Alice, and Ren as spirits. Shion is fond of Ren and treats the boy as his own son due to his and Mokuren's inability to have children. When Ren's psychic abilities awaken and he has difficulty controlling them, Shion tells him that he is the one meant to protect the Earth, which inspires Ren to promise him and Mokuren that he will do his best. when Alice becomes pregnant with her and Rin's second child, Shion subconsciously sent his powers to the child, allowing it to take on his physical appearance, even though the child turns out to be a girl. Mokuren speculates that the child, whom Rin names Chimako, is the daughter that Shion has always dreamed of having. On a side note, he is fond of Japanese culture, particularly manga and video games. He also once took over Rin's body periodically to spend more time with Ren, with Rin not noticing and even having no memory of the incidents and becoming angry with Shion when he found out. Rin forbids Shion from seeing Ren once Ren starts losing control of his psychic powers and develops a spilt personality as a result of experiencing his father's old memories but promises Shion he can see Ren when he grows up and learns to control his powers.

- Mokuren

The previous life of Alice from Please Save My Earth. After the ending of the first series, Mokuren was able to live happily with Shion, and together, as spirits, have been watching over Rin, Alice, and Ren. She still retains a close connection with Alice, offering her important facts on serious situations in the later part of the series. Mokuren loves Ren as if he was her own son due to that she is unable to have children, and along with Shion, helps Ren learn how to control his newly awakening psychic powers and encourages him to be the one who can protect Earth.

=== Secondary characters ===
- Kachiko Yakushimaru

Ren's best friend. She possesses psychic abilities, like being able to see spirits or ghouls. She is known for her stubborn and prideful personality, which often puts her at odds with Ren, whose cheerful and outgoing personality irritates her. She often criticizes him for his mistakes, but it is clear that she truly cares about him and worries about him often. It is revealed that Kachiko was conceived when her biological mother, named Pamela, offered to give Mikuro a child for him to raise on his own. She later meets her mother and develops a mother-daughter bond with her. She develops a crush on Ren, although she tends to deny it out of embarrassment.

- Mikuro Yakushimaru

Kachiko's father and former main character from Please Save My Earth. Possessing ESP, he works for EPIA and lives in America, which keeps him separated from Kachiko often. Despite being estranged from her, Mikuro loves his daughter dearly. It turns out that prior to Kachiko's birth, Mikuro had wanted to have a child, and his friend Pamela offered to bear him a child without considering marriage or sharing responsibility for their daughter. When Kachiko decides to learn more about her birth and search for her mother, Mikuro agrees to take her to America to meet Pamela for the first time, thinking it is time that she should have a relationship with her mother.

- Chimako Kobayashi

Rin and Alice's daughter and Ren's younger sister. The pregnancy with Chimako was first discovered by Mokuren who asked Ren to relate this information to Alice. Despite how difficult it was for her to give birth to Ren and the second childbirth may prove too much for her, Alice decides to have the baby and Rin chooses the name Chimako, which is what he always wanted to name his daughter and it means "child of the Earth". While unborn, she appears to Ren to warn him about their father's death in the future and find a way to change his fate. Due to Shion subconsciously giving his powers to her, Chimako closely resembles Shion.

=== Other characters ===
- Tsubasa

A classmate and friend of Ren and Kachiko. It is hinted that he has a crush on Kachiko, although he denies and believes that she and Ren like each other, much to their chagrin.

- Sakura Nishikiyori (née Kokushou)

A main character from Please Save My Earth. In the years after the first series, she has married Issei and longs to have a child. By the beginning of the series, they have been married for five years and have been unable to conceive, leading her to fear she is infertile. Because of this, she tends to spoil Ren and lavish a lot of attention on him. Eventually, a miracle occurs when Sakura discovers she is in fact pregnant.

- Issei Nishikiyori

A main character from Please Save My Earth. In the years after the first series, he has married Sakura and have tried unsuccessfully to have children. After five years of marriage, they nearly give up on their last hope of becoming parents when, in an unexpected twist of events, Sakura finds out they are expecting their first child, much to their excitement.

- Haruhiko Kazama

A main character from Please Save My Earth'. In the years after the first series, he has become a successful writer. His involvement in the series is minimum, with him offering some advice to Rin on how to be honest with Alice and Ren about his problems early in the series.

- Hajime Sakaguchi

Alice's younger brother, thus Rin's brother-in-law and Ren's maternal uncle. Despite being an adult, he is still overprotective of his sister and still refuses to acknowledge her marriage to Rin. He was enraged when Alice became pregnant with Ren, believing Rin would eventually abandon them, and although that never happened, Hajime still doesn't trust Rin. He seems to genuinely care for Ren and is often concerned for the boy's well-being.

- Kou Shibaura

A former classmate of Ren's from middle school and works as a police officer. He meets with Rin after his ESP abilities begin to weaken and is interested in learning more about the Kobayashi family. For unknown reasons, he is able to see Mokuren and Shion, and can even communicate with them. He helps Rin, Alice, and Ren find a way to prevent Rin's death in the future. He is married with a one-year-old son.

- Pamela

Kachiko's mother and former friend and lover of Mikuro, originally introduced in the short story Things Accidentally Left Behind. She lives in America and works at EPIA with Mikuro, although they severed contact with each other following Kachiko's birth. During his time in America, Mikuro told Pamela, who was already dating someone else, about his desire to have a child without being married. To his surprise, Pamela offered to give birth to his child but they agreed to not enter in a committed relationship and only he would raise the child. When Kachiko learns the truth about the origins of her birth, she decides to meet her mother, and with Mikuro's blessing, she and Pamela meet and start to form their mother-daughter relationship.
