= Please Save My Earth =

Japanese manga series

- First tankōbon volume cover

ぼくの地球を守って (Boku no Chikyū o Mamotte)
- Genre: Romance; Science fiction; Supernatural
- Manga
- Written by: Saki Hiwatari
- Published by: Hakusensha
- English publisher: NA: Viz Media
- Magazine: Hana to Yume
- Original run: December 20, 1986 – May 20, 1994
- Volumes: 21
- Original video animation
- Directed by: Kazuo Yamazaki
- Produced by: Mitsuhisa Ishikawa; Tetsuya Maeda; Yuko Sakurai
- Written by: Kazuo Yamazaki
- Music by: Hajime Mizoguchi; Yoko Kanno
- Studio: Production I.G
- Licensed by: NA: Viz Media
- Released: December 17, 1993 – September 23, 1994
- Runtime: 30 minutes (each)
- Episodes: 6
- Anime film

Please Save My Earth: From Alice to Rin
- Directed by: Kazuo Yamazaki
- Produced by: Mitsuhisa Ishikawa; Tetsuya Maeda; Yuko Sakurai
- Written by: Kazuo Yamazaki
- Music by: Hajime Mizoguchi; Yoko Kanno
- Studio: Production I.G
- Released: November 25, 1994
- Runtime: 100 minutes
- Original video animation

Please Save My Earth – Music Image Video: The Golden Age is Gone
- Directed by: Kazuo Yamazaki
- Studio: Production I.G
- Released: February 24, 1995
- Runtime: 30 minutes
- Television drama
- Directed by: Takahiro Miki
- Produced by: Kazuya Sawamura
- Written by: Nana Yamamoto
- Music by: Moshimoss (Kosuke Anamizu)
- Studio: Kadokawa Daiei Studio; The Seven
- Licensed by: Amazon Prime Video
- Original run: Q4 2027 – scheduled

Please Save My Earth (Japanese: ぼくの地球を守って, Hepburn: Boku no Chikyū o Mamotte) is a Japanese manga series written and illustrated by Saki Hiwatari. It was published by Hakusensha from December 1986 to May 1994 in the magazine Hana to Yume and collected in 21 tankōbon volumes. It is about six young people and a seven-year-old boy who share common dreams about their past lives as alien scientists who observed the Earth from the Moon.

The series was adapted as a six-part original video animation (OVA) in 1993. A sequel manga, Embraced by the Moonlight, was serialized in the bimonthly Hana to Yume as well as the special edition magazine, Hana to Yume Plus. It has since been followed by I Sing with the Earth. Both the anime OVA and manga are licensed for distribution in North America by Viz Media. A live-action drama adaptation will be streamed worldwide on Amazon Prime Video in Q4 2027.

By May 2006, Please Save My Earth had over 15 million copies in circulation.

== Plot ==
The story follows high-school student Alice Sakaguchi, her seven-year-old neighbor Rin Kobayashi, and five other students who share recurring dreams about alien scientists stationed on the Moon to observe Earth. After Alice has one of these "Moon dreams", she joins classmates Jinpachi and Issei in searching for the others who dream as the remaining scientists. What begins as a "game" becomes something darker as the group realizes the dreams are suppressed memories of tragic past lives. They now must confront those memories while keeping old rivalries, jealousies, and betrayals from consuming their present lives.

== Production ==
Before working on Please Save My Earth, Saki Hiwatari was exhausted by drawing her previous series Akuma-kun and wanted to create something that would feel "healing" for her to draw. She observed the magnolia tree at her workplace and started off from there. However, when working on the script, she added more suspense. She described working on the series as a result of her fighting with herself over whether she should draw something serious or something funny. Initially, the series was only supposed to last one year. The series mixes dramatic storytelling with comic relief. Many of the jokes in early volumes of the series refer to 1980s anime and manga. Critic Jason Thompson notes that the story becomes more dark and adult-themed from volume 9 on. The visual style, for example of the character design, changes throughout the series. The character design of Issei's sister Kyoko was influenced by Osamu Tezuka and is a homage to classic style of manga artists such as Miyako Maki, Macoto Takahashi, Hideko Mizuno, and Shotaro Ishinomori.

== Media ==
=== Manga ===
Written and illustrated by Saki Hiwatari, Please Save My Earth was serialized by Hakusensha in the monthly magazine Hana to Yume from December 20, 1986, to May 20, 1994, with its chapters collected in 21 tankōbon volumes. The series was later reissued in 12 bunkoban volumes in 1998; and again in an A5 format edition (wide-ban) of 10 volumes in 2004.

It is licensed in English in North America by Viz Media, with all volumes translated. The series has also been translated into French; German; and Spanish.

=== OVA ===
Please Save My Earth was adapted as an original video animation (OVA) directed by Kazuo Yamazaki and produced by Production I.G. The six-episode OVA anime covers the first 8 volumes in condensed form. It is licensed in English by Viz Media. Please Save My Earth – Special Omnibus Edition: From Alice to Rin (ぼくの地球を守って 総集編完全版 〜亜梨子から、輪くんへ〜, Boku no Chikyū o Mamotte Sōshūhen Kanzenban Arisu kara, Rin-kun e) is a 100-minute compilation movie narrated by Alice, reminiscing on the events of the main OVA as she is on her way to meet with Rin in a park. Please Save My Earth – Music Image Video: The Golden Age is Gone (ぼくの地球を守って MUSIC IMAGE VIDEO 〜金色の時 流れて〜, Boku no Chikyū o MamotteMyūjikku Imēji Bideo Kin'iro no Toki Nagarete) contains six music videos with footage not seen in the main OVA and scenes taken from the manga, as well as a slightly different version of the OVA ending sequence, and the ending credits for the image videos.

=== Drama ===
A live-action drama adaptation was announced on August 21, 2026. It will be directed by Takahiro Miki and written by Nana Yamamoto, with Moshimoss (Kosuke Anamizu) composing the music and Kadokawa Daiei Studio and The Seven as producing studios. The series will be streamed worldwide on Amazon Prime Video in Q4 2027.

== Reception ==
By May 2006, Please Save My Earth had over 15 million copies in circulation.

Starting in volume 8 of the manga, a disclaimer appeared at the bottom of the first page of every compilation volume, stating that the story was entirely fictional. This was, because Hiwatari received letters from people who were convinced that they had been part of the Moon scientist's society or even one of the Moon scientists themselves, and had been sent on Earth. These disclaimers have since appeared in her others works, most notably on the first pages of each volume of Global Garden.

Several manga artists have cited Please Save My Earth as an influence on them, including Naoko Takeuchi and Bisco Hatori. Jason Thompson called Please Save My Earth in Manga: The Complete Guide a "masterpiece of young-adult science fiction" and praised Hiwatari's "slow-paced" as well as "consistently rewarding and unpredictable" storytelling. Shiro Maekawa, the writer for the 2001 video game Sonic Adventure 2, was inspired by Please Save My Earth for the scene in which the characters Shadow and Maria look at Earth from the space colony.

== See also ==
- The Tale of the Bamboo Cutter, a Japanese folktale with similar elements
